= Benjy =

Benjy is a masculine given name, usually a diminutive form (hypocorism) of Benjamin. It is also a surname.

Benjy, Bengy or Bengie may refer to:

== People ==
- Dudley Benjafield (1887–1957), British racing driver and doctor
- Benjamin Benjy Dial (1943–2001), American football quarterback
- Benjy King, a former member of the American rock band Scandal
- Benjamín Cintrón Lebrón, Puerto Rican politician nicknamed "Bengie"
- Bengie Molina (born 1974), former Major League Baseball catcher from Puerto Rico
- Otto Benjamin Benjy Taylor (born 1967), American college basketball head coach
- Anatole de Bengy (1824–1871), French Jesuit martyr
- Marie-Madeleine d'Houët (1781–1858), Viscountess de Bonnault d'Houet, née Marie-Madeleine-Victoire de Bengy, French founder of a religious institute of Religious Sisters known as the Faithful Companions of Jesus

== Fictional characters ==
- Benjy Benjamin, in the film It's a Mad, Mad, Mad, Mad World, played by Buddy Hackett
- Benjamin "Benjy" Compson, in the novel The Sound and the Fury by William Faulkner and film adaptations thereof
- Benjamin "Benjy" Fleming, a character in the American TV series Monk
- Benjy Hawk, in the American soap opera Days of Our Lives
- Benjamin Richard Parker, the son of Mary Jane and Peter Parker (Spider-Man) in Marvel Comics
- Benjy Riordan, on the Irish soap opera The Riordans
- Benjy Stone, a main character in the film My Favorite Year
- Benjy, in the strip Ball Boy in the UK comic The Beano
- title character of Engie Benjy, a British stop-motion children's television series

== See also ==
- Benjys, a defunct chain of sandwich shops in the United Kingdom
- Bengies Drive-In Theatre, Middle River, Maryland, United States
- Benji (disambiguation)
