= Benji (disambiguation) =

Benji is a fictional dog in a series of films and a television series. Benji may also refer to:

== People ==
- Abdessalam Benjelloun (born 1985), Moroccan association football player, nicknamed "Benji"
- Andrew Veniamin (1975–2004), Melbourne underworld hitman, better known as "Benji"
- Benjamin "Benji" Compton (born 1986), Spanish-British motorcycle speedway rider
- Benjamin "Benji" Madden (born 1979), one of the twins in the band Good Charlotte
- Benjamin "Benji" Marshall (born 1985), New Zealand rugby league footballer
- Benjamin Mascolo (born 1993), Italian singer, known as "Benji" and part of the duo Benji & Fede
- Benji Webbe (born 1967), singer of the reggae-metal band Skindred and formerly of Dub War
- Le Quang Huy, better known as Benji (born 1997), Hungarian singer
- Benji the Binman, nickname of Benjamin Pell (born 1963), British researcher for tabloid newspapers, known for sifting through celebrities' dustbins
- Benjamin (Benji) Ungar (born 1986), American fencer
- Benji Whelan, Irish Gaelic football manager

== Films ==
- Benji (1974 film), the first film in a series of nine about the golden mixed breed dog named Benji
- Benji (2012 film), a documentary about the life and death of Chicago basketball player Ben Wilson
- Benji (2018 film), a reboot of the 1974 film

== Other uses ==
- Benji Village, Uttarakhand state, India
- Benji (album), a 2014 studio album by the American indie folk act Sun Kil Moon
- Benjamin Benji McHugh, a fictional character in UK soap opera Family Affairs
- Benjaminised Acol, variant of the Acol bidding system in contract bridge

== See also ==
- Benjy, a list of people and fictional characters with the given name or nickname
- Benjy (film), a 1951 American short documentary film
- Benjys, the first low-priced chain of sandwich shops in the United Kingdom
