= 2014–15 Long Beach State 49ers men's basketball team =

American college basketball season

2014–15 Long Beach State 49ers men's basketball
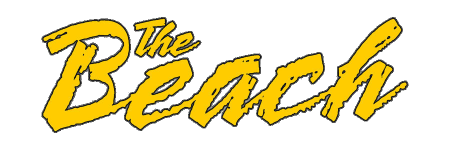
- Conference: Big West Conference
- Record: 16–17 (10–6 Big West)
- Head coach: Dan Monson (8th season)
- Assistant coaches: Rod Palmer; Eric Brown; Myke Scholl
- Home arena: Walter Pyramid

2014–15 Big West men's basketball standings
| | Conf. | | | | Overall |
| Team | W | | L | PCT | W | | L | PCT |
|---|---|---|---|---|---|---|---|---|
| UC Davis | 14 | – | 2 | .875 | 25 | – | 7 | .781 |
| UC Irvine † | 11 | – | 5 | .688 | 21 | – | 13 | .618 |
| UC Santa Barbara | 11 | – | 5 | .688 | 19 | – | 14 | .576 |
| Long Beach State | 10 | – | 6 | .625 | 16 | – | 17 | .485 |
| Hawai'i | 8 | – | 8 | .500 | 22 | – | 13 | .629 |
| UC Riverside | 7 | – | 9 | .438 | 14 | – | 17 | .452 |
| Cal Poly | 6 | – | 10 | .375 | 13 | – | 16 | .448 |
| Cal State Northridge | 4 | – | 12 | .250 | 9 | – | 24 | .273 |
| Cal State Fullerton | 1 | – | 15 | .063 | 9 | – | 22 | .290 |
† 2015 Big West tournament winner

The 2014–15 Long Beach State 49ers men's basketball team represented California State University, Long Beach during the 2014–15 NCAA Division I men's basketball season. The 49ers were led by eighth year head coach Dan Monson and played their home games at Walter Pyramid. They were members of the Big West Conference. They finished the season 16–17, 10–6 in Big West play to finish in fourth place. They lost in the quarterfinals of the Big West tournament to Hawaii.

== Roster ==
| Number | Name | Position | Height | Weight | Year | Hometown |
|---|---|---|---|---|---|---|
| 1 | Tyler Lamb | Guard | 6–5 | 205 | Senior | Santa Ana, California |
| 2 | Nick Faust | Guard | 6–6 | 210 | Junior | Baltimore, Maryland |
| 3 | Anson Moye | Guard | 6–0 | 175 | Sophomore | Thousand Oaks, California |
| 4 | Temidayo Yussuf | Forward | 6–7 | 260 | Freshman | Oakland, California |
| 5 | Mike Caffey | Guard | 6–0 | 175 | Senior | Corona, California |
| 11 | David Samuels | Forward | 6–7 | 225 | Senior | Bronx, New York |
| 12 | Eric McKnight | Forward | 6–9 | 220 | Senior | Raleigh, North Carolina |
| 13 | Deontae North | Guard | 6–4 | 190 | Freshman | Del Amo, California |
| 14 | Branford Jones | Guard | 6–1 | 175 | Sophomore | Missouri City, Texas |
| 15 | A.J. Spencer | Guard | 6–5 | 205 | Senior | Shawnee, Kansas |
| 20 | Desmond Ross | Guard | 6–3 | 190 | Freshman | Mesa, Arizona |
| 21 | Justin Bibbins | Guard | 5–8 | 150 | Freshman | Carson, California |
| 22 | Alex Rifkind | Guard | 6–1 | 170 | Freshman | Boca Raton, Florida |
| 23 | Roschon Prince | Forward | 6–6 | 230 | Sophomore | Long Beach, California |
| 24 | Travis Hammonds | Guard/Forward | 6–6 | 225 | Sophomore | Columbia, South Carolina |
| 25 | Christian Griggs-Williams | Forward | 6–7 | 260 | Senior | Milwaukee, Wisconsin |
| 31 | McKay LaSalle | Guard | 6-3 | 185 | Senior | Bountiful, Utah |
| 34 | Charles Lockett | Forward | 6–6 | 235 | Senior | Los Angeles, California |
| 35 | Jack Williams | Forward | 6–8 | 195 | Freshman | Valencia, California |

== Schedule ==
| Date time, TV | Opponent | Result | Record | Site (attendance) city, state |
Regular season
| 11/14/2014*; 4:00 pm, BYUtv | at BYU | L 90–95 | 0–1 | Marriott Center (16,778); Provo, UT |
| 11/15/2014*; 4:00 pm | San Francisco State | W 74–64 | 1–1 | Walter Pyramid (4,727); Long Beach, CA |
| 11/18/2014*; 4:00 pm, FS1 | at Xavier | L 74–97 | 1–2 | Cintas Center (9,457); Cincinnati, OH |
| 11/21/2014*; 7:30 pm, FSN | Kansas State | W 69–60 | 2–2 | Walter Pyramid (4,256); Long Beach, CA |
| 11/23/2014*; 7:00 pm, P12N | at UCLA | L 63–77 | 2–3 | Pauley Pavilion (8,639); Los Angeles, CA |
| 11/27/2014*; 5:30 pm, ESPNU | vs. Western Michigan; Wooden Legacy quarterfinals | W 73–55 | 3–3 | Titan Gym (2,241); Fullerton, CA |
| 11/28/2014*; 8:30 pm, ESPN2 | vs. Washington; Wooden Legacy semifinals | L 70–80 | 3–4 | Titan Gym (2,430); Fullerton, CA |
| 11/30/2014*; 1:30 pm, ESPNU | vs. Xavier; Wooden Legacy 3rd place game | W 73–70 | 4–4 | Honda Center (N/A); Anaheim, CA |
| 12/03/2014*; 7:00 pm | Nevada | W 68–57 | 5–4 | Walter Pyramid (3,293); Long Beach, CA |
| 12/05/2014*; 5:00 pm | at Stephen F. Austin | L 45–74 | 5–5 | William R. Johnson Coliseum (3,899); Nacogdoches, TX |
| 12/10/2014*; 7:00 pm, ESPN3 | at No. 18 San Diego State | L 59–60 | 5–6 | Viejas Arena (12,414); San Diego, CA |
| 12/20/2014*; 5:00 pm, LHN | at No. 9 Texas | L 68–78 | 5–7 | Frank Erwin Center (9,179); Austin, TX |
| 12/22/2014*; 4:30 pm, FS1 | at No. 17 St. John's | L 49–66 | 5–8 | Carnesecca Arena (5,014); Queens, NY |
| 12/28/2014*; 11:00 am, ESPNU | at Syracuse | L 67–85 | 5–9 | Carrier Dome (22,508); Syracuse, NY |
| 12/30/2014*; 4:00 pm, ESPN3 | at No. 5 Louisville | L 48–63 | 5–10 | KFC Yum! Center (18,248); Louisville, KY |
| 01/03/2015*; 4:00 pm | Fresno Pacific | W 81–46 | 6–10 | Walter Pyramid (2,196); Long Beach, CA |
| 01/08/2015; 7:30 pm, Prime Ticket | at UC Irvine | W 88–82 | 7–10 (1–0) | Bren Events Center (2,963); Irvine, CA |
| 01/10/2015; 8:00 pm, ESPNU | at UC Davis | L 67–73 ^{OT} | 7–11 (1–1) | The Pavilion (5,089); Davis, CA |
| 01/15/2015; 7:00 pm, ESPN3 | Cal Poly | W 50–48 | 8–11 (2–1) | Walter Pyramid (2,425); Long Beach, CA |
| 01/17/2015; 4:00 pm, ESPN3 | UC Santa Barbara | W 69–53 | 9–11 (3–1) | Walter Pyramid (4,258); Long Beach, CA |
| 01/24/2015; 7:00 pm, ESPN3 | at Cal State Northridge | W 64–58 | 10–11 (4–1) | Matadome (1,395); Northridge, CA |
| 01/29/2015; 7:30 pm, Prime Ticket | at Cal State Fullerton | W 91–85 ^{OT} | 11–11 (5–1) | Titan Gym (2,090); Fullerton, CA |
| 01/31/2015; 4:00 pm, ESPN3 | Hawaii | W 65–50 | 12–11 (6–1) | Walter Pyramid (3,351); Long Beach, CA |
| 02/05/2015; 7:00 pm | UC Riverside | W 68–63 | 13–11 (7–1) | Walter Pyramid (2,804); Long Beach, CA |
| 02/07/2015; 4:00 pm, ESPN3 | UC Irvine | L 55–56 | 13–12 (7–2) | Walter Pyramid (3,834); Long Beach, CA |
| 02/12/2015; 7:30 pm, Prime Ticket | at UC Santa Barbara | L 55–70 | 13–13 (7–3) | UCSB Events Center (4,116); Santa Barbara, CA |
| 02/14/2015; 7:00 pm | at Cal Poly | L 58–71 | 13–14 (7–4) | Mott Gym (2,435); San Luis Obispo, CA |
| 02/19/2015; 7:00 pm, ESPN3 | UC Davis | L 58–65 | 13–15 (7–5) | Walter Pyramid (3,426); Long Beach, CA |
| 02/26/2015; 9:00 pm | at Hawaii | L 59–78 | 13–16 (7–6) | Stan Sheriff Center (6,448); Honolulu, HI |
| 02/28/2015; 4:00 pm, ESPN3 | Cal State Fullerton | W 70–47 | 14–16 (8–6) | Walter Pyramid (4,357); Long Beach, CA |
| 03/05/2015; 7:00 pm, ESPN3 | Cal State Northridge | W 69–58 | 15–16 (9–6) | Walter Pyramid; Long Beach, CA |
| 03/07/2015; 5:00 pm | at UC Riverside | W 59–58 | 16–16 (10–6) | UC Riverside Student Recreation Center (976); Riverside, CA |
Big West tournament
| 03/12/2015; 5:30 pm | vs. Hawaii | L 72–79 | 16–17 (10-6) | Honda Center; Anaheim, CA |
*Non-conference game. ^{#}Rankings from AP Poll. (#) Tournament seedings in parentheses. All times are in Pacific Time.
