= 2014–15 UC Riverside Highlanders men's basketball team =

American college basketball season

2014–15 UC Riverside Highlanders men's basketball
- Conference: Big West Conference
- Record: 14–17 (7–9 Big West)
- Head coach: Dennis Cutts (2nd season)
- Assistant coaches: Stephen Sauers; Justin Bell; Keith Wilkinson
- Home arena: Student Recreation Center Arena

2014–15 Big West men's basketball standings
	Conf.				Overall
Team	W		L	PCT	W		L	PCT
UC Davis	14	–	2	.875	25	–	7	.781
UC Irvine †	11	–	5	.688	21	–	13	.618
UC Santa Barbara	11	–	5	.688	19	–	14	.576
Long Beach State	10	–	6	.625	16	–	17	.485
Hawai'i	8	–	8	.500	22	–	13	.629
UC Riverside	7	–	9	.438	14	–	17	.452
Cal Poly	6	–	10	.375	13	–	16	.448
Cal State Northridge	4	–	12	.250	9	–	24	.273
Cal State Fullerton	1	–	15	.063	9	–	22	.290
† 2015 Big West tournament winner

The 2014–15 UC Riverside Highlanders men's basketball team represented the University of California, Riverside during the 2014–15 NCAA Division I men's basketball season. The Highlanders were led by second year head coach Dennis Cutts and played their home games at the Student Recreation Center Arena as members of the Big West Conference. They finished the season 14–17, 7–9 in Big West play to finish in seventh place. They lost in the quarterfinals of the Big West tournament to UC Irvine.

== Roster ==
2014–15 UC Riverside Highlanders men's basketball team
Players
Coaches

Pos.	#	Name	Height	Weight	Year	Previous school	Hometown
G	0	Nick Gruninger	5 ft 10 in (1.78 m)	160 lb (73 kg)	Sr	Davis HS; Snow CC	Kaysville, UT
G	1	Jaylen Bland	6 ft 3 in (1.91 m)	205 lb (93 kg)	Jr	Cleveland HS; Murray State; College of the Canyons	Saginaw, MI
G	3	Charles Standifer	6 ft 5 in (1.96 m)	185 lb (84 kg)	Sr	Capital Christian HS	Sacramento, CA
F	5	Taylor Johns	6 ft 7 in (2.01 m)	220 lb (100 kg)	Jr	Sacred Heart Prep	San Francisco, CA
G	10	Steven Jones	6 ft 0 in (1.83 m)	175 lb (79 kg)	Jr	Taft HS	Northridge, CA
F	11	Terrence Jr. Tisdell	6 ft 7 in (2.01 m)	220 lb (100 kg)	Jr	Central HS	Cape Girardeau, MO
F	12	Robert Boezeman	6 ft 7 in (2.01 m)	220 lb (100 kg)	Fr	Canarias Basketball Academy	Dordrecht, Netherlands
F	13	Steven Thornton	6 ft 4 in (1.93 m)	215 lb (98 kg)	Sr	Golden Valley HS; Citrus College; Utah State	Santa Clarita, CA
G	15	Brian Wright	6 ft 3 in (1.91 m)	170 lb (77 kg)	Fr	St. Anthony HS	Carson, CA
F	20	Cheick Thiero	6 ft 9 in (2.06 m)	225 lb (102 kg)	Jr	Arlington Country Day; Tallahassee CC	Bamako, Mali
F	21	Alex Larrson	6 ft 9 in (2.06 m)	245 lb (111 kg)	Fr	Södertälje Knights Club Team	Södertälje, Sweden
F	22	Colin Gruber	6 ft 5 in (1.96 m)	190 lb (86 kg)	Sr	Harbor HS; Northern Arizona; Cabrillo CC	Aptos, CA
G	31	Chris Tang	6 ft 3 in (1.91 m)	190 lb (86 kg)	Fr	Canarias Basketball Academy	Jiangsu, China
G	35	Austin Quick	6 ft 3 in (1.91 m)	180 lb (82 kg)	Sr	Murrieta Valley HS	Murrieta, CA

Head coach

- Dennis Cutts (Albany)

Assistant coach(es)

- Mike Miller (USC)
- Justin Bell (UC Riverside)
- Steve Sauers (Albany)

Legend

- (C) Team captain
- (S) Suspended
- (I) Ineligible
- (W) Walk-on
- Injured
- Current redshirt

Roster

== Schedule and results ==
Date time, TV	Opponent	Result	Record	Site (attendance) city, state
Exhibition
11/07/2014*; 7:00 pm	Holy Names	W 66–49		SRC Arena (602); Riverside, CA
Non-conference games
11/15/2014*; 4:00 pm	UC San Diego	W 75–52	1–0	SRC Arena (2,341); Riverside, CA
11/17/2014*; 7:00 pm	Sacramento State	L 69–70	1–1	SRC Arena (580); Riverside, CA
11/21/2014*; 6:00 pm, P12N	at No. 25 Utah	L 42–88	1–2	Jon M. Huntsman Center (9,645); Salt Lake City, UT
11/23/2014*; 1:00 pm	Saint Katherine	W 102–49	2–2	SRC Arena (310); Riverside, CA
11/26/2014*; 5:00 pm	at Loyola Marymount	L 62–66	2–3	Gersten Pavilion (1,625); Los Angeles, CA
11/29/2014*; 1:00 pm	Abilene Christian	W 76–56	3–3	SRC Arena (183); Riverside, CA
12/02/2014*; 7:00 pm	at Cal State Bakersfield	W 59–58	4–3	Icardo Center (763); Bakersfield, CA
12/06/2014*; 5:00 pm	Portland State	W 88–62	5–3	SRC Arena (582); Riverside, CA
12/10/2014*; 8:00 pm, P12N	at UCLA	L 66–77	5–4	Pauley Pavilion (5,450); Los Angeles, CA
12/20/2014*; 1:00 pm	Houston Baptist	W 78–67	6–4	SRC Arena (273); Riverside, CA
12/22/2014*; 8:00 pm, FSSD	at San Diego State	L 33–61	6–5	Viejas Arena (12,414); San Diego, CA
12/30/2014*; 7:00 pm	Morgan State	W 68–63	7–5	SRC Arena (288); Riverside, CA
01/02/2015*; 5:00 pm, ESPN3	at Northern Illinois	L 67–72 ^{OT}	7–7	Convocation Center (873); DeKalb, IL
01/04/2015*; 3:00 pm	at Grand Canyon	L 69–71	7–7	GCU Arena (3,714); Phoenix, AZ
Conference games
01/08/2015; 7:00 pm	Cal State Fullerton	W 84–78 ^{OT}	8–7 (1–0)	SRC Arena (712); Riverside, CA
01/10/2015; 7:00 pm	at UC Irvine	L 55–69	8–8 (1–1)	Bren Events Center (2,047); Irvine, CA
01/15/2015; 7:00 pm	UC Davis	L 61–74	8–9 (1–2)	SRC Arena (923); Riverside, CA
01/17/2015; 5:00 pm, ESPNU	Hawaii	W 66–62	9–9 (2–2)	SRC Arena (1,167); Riverside, CA
01/22/2015; 7:00 pm	at UC Santa Barbara	L 75–83	9–10 (2–3)	The Thunderdome (1,486); Santa Barbara, CA
01/24/2015; 7:00 pm	at Cal Poly	L 49–68	9–11 (2–4)	Mott Gym (2,897); San Luis Obispo, CA
01/31/2015; 5:00 pm	Cal State Northridge	W 66–62	10–11 (3–4)	SRC Arena (579); Riverside, CA
02/05/2015; 7:00 pm	at Long Beach State	L 63–68	10–12 (3–5)	Walter Pyramid (2,804); Long Beach, CA
02/07/2015; 5:00 pm	at Cal State Fullerton	W 71–66 ^{OT}	11–12 (4–5)	Titan Gym (3,102); Fullerton, CA
02/12/2015; 9:00 pm	at Hawaii	L 52–73	11–13 (4–6)	Stan Sheriff Center (5,715); Honolulu, HI
02/14/2015; 7:00 pm, ESPN3	UC Irvine	W 70–63	12–13 (5–6)	SRC Arena (592); Riverside, CA
02/19/2015; 7:00 pm, ESPN3	UC Santa Barbara	W 64–62	13–13 (6–6)	SRC Arena (845); Riverside, CA
02/21/2015; 7:00 pm	Cal Poly	W 48–44	14–13 (7–6)	SRC Arena (1,076); Riverside, CA
02/28/2015; 7:00 pm	at Cal State Northridge	L 76–83	14–14 (7–7)	Matadome (1,600); Northridge, CA
03/05/2015; 7:00 pm	at UC Davis	L 59–61	14–15 (7–8)	The Pavilion (3,255); Davis, CA
03/07/2015; 5:00 pm	Long Beach State	L 58–59	14–16 (7–9)	SRC Arena (976); Riverside, CA
Big West tournament
03/12/2015; 9:00 pm	vs. UC Irvine	L 54–63	14–17	Honda Center; Anaheim, CA
*Non-conference game. ^{#}Rankings from AP Poll. (#) Tournament seedings in parentheses. All times are in Pacific Time.
