= 2014–15 Louisville Cardinals men's basketball team =

American college basketball season

2014–15 Louisville Cardinals men's basketball

NCAA tournament, Elite Eight (vacated)
- Conference: Atlantic Coast Conference

Ranking
- Coaches: No. 10
- AP: No. 17
- Record: 0–8 (27 wins, 1 loss vacated) (0–6 ACC, 12 wins vacated)
- Head coach: Rick Pitino (14th season)
- Assistant coaches: Wyking Jones; Kenny Johnson; Mike Balado
- Home arena: KFC Yum! Center

2014–15 ACC men's basketball standings
	Conf.				Overall
Team	W		L	PCT	W		L	PCT
No. 6 Virginia	16	–	2	.889	30	–	4	.882
No. 4 Duke	15	–	3	.833	35	–	4	.897
No. 8 Notre Dame †	14	–	4	.778	32	–	6	.842
No. 15 North Carolina	11	–	7	.611	26	–	12	.684
Miami (FL)	10	–	8	.556	25	–	13	.658
NC State	10	–	8	.556	22	–	14	.611
Syracuse	9	–	9	.500	18	–	13	.581
Clemson	8	–	10	.444	16	–	15	.516
Florida State	8	–	10	.444	17	–	16	.515
Pittsburgh	8	–	10	.444	19	–	15	.559
Wake Forest	5	–	13	.278	13	–	19	.406
Boston College	4	–	14	.222	13	–	19	.406
Georgia Tech	3	–	15	.167	12	–	19	.387
Virginia Tech	2	–	16	.111	11	–	22	.333
No. 17 Louisville*	0	–	6	.000	0	–	8	.000
† ACC tournament winner Rankings from AP poll *Louisville: 24 reg. season games, 4 postseason games vacated due to sanctions against the program; Disputed Record-(27-9)(12-6)

The 2014–15 Louisville Cardinals men's basketball team represented the University of Louisville during the 2014–15 NCAA Division I men's basketball season, Louisville's 101st season of intercollegiate competition. The Cardinals competed in their first season in the Atlantic Coast Conference and were coached by Rick Pitino, in his fourteenth season at U of L. The team played its home games on Denny Crum Court at the KFC Yum! Center in downtown Louisville.

They finished 27–9, 12–6 in ACC play, placing 4th, and earning a double bye in the ACC tournament. Louisville lost its first ever ACC Tournament game to North Carolina and earned at-large bid to the NCAA tournament. In their 41st NCAA Tournament appearance, they defeated UC Irvine, Northern Iowa, and NC State to advance to the Elite Eight where they lost to Michigan State.

On February 20, 2018, the NCAA announced that Louisville will be forced to vacate wins and records from the 2011–12, 2012–13, 2013–14, and 2014–15 seasons.

== Departures ==
Name	Number	Pos.	Height	Weight	Year	Hometown	Notes
Russ Smith	2	SG	6'0"	165	Senior	Brooklyn, New York	Graduated. Entered the 2014 NBA draft
Kevin Ware	5	SG	6'4"	170	Junior	Bronx, New York	Transferred to Georgia State
Luke Hancock	11	SG	6'6"	200	Senior	Roanoke, Virginia	Graduated
Tim Henderson	15	SG	6'2"	195	Senior	Louisville, Kentucky	Graduated
Stephan Van Treese	44	C	6'9"	245	Senior	Indianapolis, Indiana	Graduated

== Class of 2014 signees ==
College recruiting
Name	Hometown	School	Height	Weight	Commit date
Shaqquan Aaron; SG	Seattle, Washington	Rainier Beach	6 ft 7 in (2.01 m)	175 lb (79 kg)	Feb 16, 2013
Shaqquan Aaron; SG	Recruit ratings: Scout: Rivals: 247Sports: ESPN:				
Quentin Snider; PG	Louisville, Kentucky	Ballard	6 ft 1 in (1.85 m)	165 lb (75 kg)	Nov 15, 2013
Quentin Snider; PG	Recruit ratings: Scout: Rivals: 247Sports: ESPN:				
Chinanu Onuaku; C	Upper Marlboro, Maryland	Riverdale Baptist	6 ft 10 in (2.08 m)	220 lb (100 kg)	Apr 10, 2013
Chinanu Onuaku; C	Recruit ratings: Scout: Rivals: 247Sports: ESPN:				
Anas Osama Mahmoud; C	Cairo, Egypt	West Oaks Academy	7 ft 1 in (2.16 m)	195 lb (88 kg)	Mar 3, 2014
Anas Osama Mahmoud; C	Recruit ratings: Scout: Rivals: 247Sports: ESPN:				
Jaylen Johnson; PF	Ypsilanti, Michigan	Ypsilanti	6 ft 9 in (2.06 m)	210 lb (95 kg)	Sep 16, 2013
Jaylen Johnson; PF	Recruit ratings: Scout: Rivals: 247Sports: ESPN:				
Matz Stockman; C	Oslo, Norway	Canarias Basketball Academy	7 ft 1 in (2.16 m)	235 lb (107 kg)	Nov 19, 2013
Matz Stockman; C	Recruit ratings: Scout: Rivals: 247Sports: ESPN:				
Overall recruit ranking: Scout: 8 Rivals: 7 ESPN: 8
Note: In many cases, Scout, Rivals, 247Sports, On3, and ESPN may conflict in their listings of height and weight.; In these cases, the average was taken. ESPN grades are on a 100-point scale.; Sources: "Louisville Basketball Commitment List". Rivals.; "2014 Louisville Basketball Commitment List". Scout.; "ESPN". ESPN.; "Scout.com Team Recruiting Rankings". Scout.; "2014 Team Ranking". Rivals.

== Roster ==
2014–15 Louisville Cardinals men's basketball team
Players
Coaches
}

Pos.	#	Name	Height	Weight	Year	Previous school	Hometown
G	0	Terry Rozier	6 ft 1 in (1.85 m)	190 lb (86 kg)	So	Hargrave Military Academy	Cleveland, Ohio
G	1	Anton Gill	6 ft 4 in (1.93 m)	190 lb (86 kg)	So	Hargrave Military Academy	Raleigh, North Carolina
G	2	Quentin Snider	6 ft 2 in (1.88 m)	180 lb (82 kg)	Fr	Ballard	Louisville, Kentucky
G	4	Dillon Avare (W)	6 ft 0 in (1.83 m)	150 lb (68 kg)	RS Fr	Lexington Catholic	Lexington, Kentucky
F/C	5	Matz Stockman	7 ft 0 in (2.13 m)	240 lb (109 kg)	Fr	Canarias (BAH)	Oslo, Norway
F	10	Jaylen Johnson	6 ft 9 in (2.06 m)	215 lb (98 kg)	Fr	Ypsilanti	Ypsilanti, Michigan
F/C	12	Mangok Mathiang	6 ft 10 in (2.08 m)	220 lb (100 kg)	RS So	IMG Academy (FL)	Melbourne, Australia
F	14	Anas Mahmoud	7 ft 0 in (2.13 m)	200 lb (91 kg)	Fr	West Oaks (FL)	Cairo, Egypt
G	15	Trent Gilbert (W)	6 ft 0 in (1.83 m)	180 lb (82 kg)	Fr	Scott County	Georgetown, Kentucky
G	21	Shaqquan Aaron	6 ft 7 in (2.01 m)	170 lb (77 kg)	Fr	Rainier Beach	Seattle, Washington
F	23	David Levtich (W)	6 ft 3 in (1.91 m)	180 lb (82 kg)	So	North Oldham	Goshen, Kentucky
F	24	Montrezl Harrell (C)	6 ft 8 in (2.03 m)	240 lb (109 kg)	Jr	Hargrave Military Academy (VA)	Tarboro, North Carolina
G/F	25	Wayne Blackshear (C)	6 ft 5 in (1.96 m)	215 lb (98 kg)	Sr	Morgan Park	Chicago, Illinois
F/C	32	Chinanu Onuaku	6 ft 10 in (2.08 m)	230 lb (104 kg)	Fr	Riverdale Baptist	Lanham, Maryland

Head coach

- Rick Pitino (UMass)

Assistant coach(es)

- Wyking Jones (Loyola Marymount)
- Kenny Johnson (Maryland)
- Mike Balado (St. Thomas)

Legend

- (C) Team captain
- (S) Suspended
- (I) Ineligible
- (W) Walk-on
- Injured
- Current redshirt

- Akoy Agau left the team at the end of U of L's fall semester after having played only 11 minutes in three games this season. He transferred to Georgetown, where he will be eligible in December 2015 with two-and-a-half remaining seasons of eligibility.
- Chris Jones was dismissed from the team on February 22. He had been suspended from the Syracuse game on February 18 after having sent a threatening text message to a woman he had dated, but was reinstated several days later. After playing against Miami on February 21, he missed that night's curfew, leading to his dismissal. Several days after that, Jones was charged with rape stemming from an incident that allegedly occurred the night of the Miami game. In late April, a grand jury chose not to indict Jones and his two co-defendants in the case.

== Schedule ==
Date time, TV	Rank^{#}	Opponent^{#}	Result	Record	High points	High rebounds	High assists	Site (attendance) city, state
Exhibition
Nov 1*; 12:30 pm, WAVE–TV	No. 8	Barry	W 91–71	–	22 – Blackshear	8 – Tied	7 – Rozier	KFC Yum! Center (19,237); Louisville, KY
Nov 9*; 12:30 pm, WAVE–TV	No. 8	Bellarmine	W 82–57	–	17 – Harrell	9 – Harrell	4 – Jones	KFC Yum! Center (20,432); Louisville, KY
Non-conference regular season
Nov 14*; 7:00 pm, ESPN	No. 8	vs. Minnesota; Armed Forces Classic	W 81–68	1–0	30 – Harrell	7 – Harrell	4 – Rozier	CGAS Borinquen (1,693); Aguadilla, PR
Nov 17*; 7:00 pm, ESPN3	No. 7	Jacksonville State; Global Sports Showcase	W 88–39	2–0	15 – Harrell	10 – Onuaku	5 – Tied	KFC Yum! Center (20,479); Louisville, KY
Nov 21*; 9:00 pm, ESPNU	No. 7	Marshall; Global Sports Showcase	W 85–67	3–0	18 – Jones	11 – Tied	5 – Jones	KFC Yum! Center (21,661); Louisville, KY
Nov 24*; 7:00 pm, ESPN3	No. 6	Savannah State; Global Sports Showcase	W 87–26	4–0	15 – Harrell	9 – Tied	3 – Snider	KFC Yum! Center (19,514); Louisville, KY
Nov 26*; 7:00 pm, ESPN3	No. 6	Cleveland State; Global Sports Showcase	W 45–33	5–0	15 – Harrell	13 – Harrell	3 – Jones	KFC Yum! Center (20,887); Louisville, KY
Dec 2*; 9:30 pm, ESPN	No. 5	No. 14 Ohio State; ACC–Big Ten Challenge	W 64–55	6–0	22 – Blackshear	10 – Harrell	7 – Rozier	KFC Yum! Center (22,784); Louisville, KY
Dec 5*; 7:00 pm, RSN	No. 5	FIU	W 82–57	7–0	15 – Gill	12 – Harrell	5 – Onuaku	KFC Yum! Center (20,541); Louisville, KY
Dec 9*; 9:00 pm, ESPN	No. 4	vs. Indiana; Jimmy V Classic	W 94–74	8–0	26 – Rozier	11 – Harrell	5 – Tied	Madison Square Garden (11,617); New York, NY
Dec 14*; 6:00 pm, ESPNU	No. 4	UNC Wilmington; Billy Minardi Classic	W 68–57	9–0	19 – Harrell	17 – Harrell	2 – Blackshear	KFC Yum! Center (20,913); Louisville, KY
Dec 20*; 12:00 pm, FS1	No. 4	at WKU	W 76–67	10–0	32 – Rozier	6 – Tied	3 – Blackshear	E. A. Diddle Arena (7,598); Bowling Green, KY
Dec 23*; 7:00 pm, ESPNU	No. 4	Cal State Northridge	W 80–55	11–0	31 – Blackshear	7 – Mahmoud	5 – Rozier	KFC Yum! Center (20,231); Louisville, KY
Dec 27*; 2:00 pm, ESPN2	No. 4	No. 1 Kentucky; Battle for the Bluegrass; Basketball Hall of Fame Shootout	L 50–58	11–1	15 – Rozier	8 – Tied	1 – Jones	KFC Yum! Center (22,812); Louisville, KY
Dec 30*; 7:00 pm, ESPN3	No. 5	Long Beach State	W 63–48	12–1	23 – Rozier	7 – Tied	3 – Rozier	KFC Yum! Center (18,248); Louisville, KY
ACC regular season
Jan 4; 8:00 pm, ESPNU	No. 5	at Wake Forest	W 85–76	13–1 (1–0)	25 – Harrell	13 – Harrell	10 – Jones	LJVM Coliseum (10,862); Winston-Salem, NC
Jan 7; 9:00 pm, ACCN	No. 5	Clemson	W 58–52	14–1 (2–0)	22 – Jones	9 – Mathiang	4 – Rozier	KFC Yum! Center (21,676); Louisville, KY
Jan 10; 2:00 pm, ESPN	No. 5	at No. 18 North Carolina	L 71–72	14–2 (2–1)	25 – Rozier	8 – Onuaku	5 – Tied	Dean Smith Center (21,750); Chapel Hill, NC
Jan 13; 7:00 pm, RSN	No. 6	Virginia Tech	W 78–63	15–2 (3–1)	16 – Rozier	8 – Tied	11 – Jones	KFC Yum! Center (21,684); Louisville, KY
Jan 17; 12:00 pm, ESPN	No. 6	No. 4 Duke	L 52–63	15–3 (3–2)	17 – Rozier	14 – Harrell	4 – Jones	KFC Yum! Center (22,791); Louisville, KY
Jan 25; 1:30 pm, CBS	No. 10	at Pittsburgh	W 80–68	16–3 (4–2)	26 – Rozier	7 – Harrell	9 – Jones	Petersen Events Center (12,508); Pittsburgh, PA
Jan 28; 9:00 pm, ACCN	No. 10	at Boston College	W 81–72	17–3 (5–2)	28 – Jones	5 – Harrell	5 – Rozier	Conte Forum (5,119); Chesnut Hill, MA
Jan 31; 4:00 pm, ESPN	No. 10	No. 13 North Carolina	W 78–68 ^{OT}	18–3 (6–2)	22 – Tied	15 – Harrell	4 – Paige	KFC Yum! Center (22,418); Louisville, KY
Feb 3; 8:00 pm, ACCN	No. 9	at Miami (FL)	W 63–55	19–3 (7–2)	22 – Rozier	9 – Harrell	5 – Jones	BankUnited Center (6,563); Coral Gables, FL
Feb 7; 6:00 pm, ESPN	No. 9	at No. 3 Virginia	L 47–52	19–4 (7–3)	16 – Rozier	7 – Blackshear	5 – Rozier	John Paul Jones Arena (14,593); Charlottesville, VA
Feb 11; 8:00 pm, ACCN	No. 9	Pittsburgh	W 69–56	20–4 (8–3)	28 – Harrell	12 – Harrell	3 – Rozier	KFC Yum! Center (22,132); Louisville, KY
Feb 14; 4:00 pm, ESPN	No. 9	NC State	L 65–74	20–5 (8–4)	20 – Jones	13 – Harrell	3 – Jones	KFC Yum! Center (22,410); Louisville, KY
Feb 18; 7:00 pm, ESPN	No. 12	at Syracuse	L 59–69	20–6 (8–5)	17 – Rozier	11 – Onuaku	4 – Tied	Carrier Dome (26,160); Syracuse, NY
Feb 21; 2:00 pm, ESPN/ESPN2	No. 12	Miami (FL)	W 55–53	21–6 (9–5)	21 – Harrell	14 – Harrell	2 – Tied	KFC Yum! Center (21,345); Louisville, KY
Feb 23; 7:00 pm, ESPN	No. 17	at Georgia Tech	W 52–51	22–6 (10–5)	22 – Rozier	8 – Tied	4 – Snider	Hank McCamish Pavilion (7,009); Atlanta, GA
Feb 28; 12:00 pm, ESPN2	No. 17	at Florida State	W 81–59	23–6 (11–5)	18 – Blackshear	9 – Mathiang	9 – Rozier	Donald L. Tucker Center (8,844); Tallahassee, FL
Mar 4; 7:00 pm, ESPN2	No. 16	No. 12 Notre Dame	L 59–71	23–7 (11–6)	23 – Harrell	12 – Harrell	5 – Rozier	KFC Yum! Center (21,024); Louisville, KY
Mar 7; 6:30 pm, ESPN	No. 16	No. 2 Virginia	W 59–57	24–7 (12–6)	20 – Harrell	12 – Harrell	4 – Rozier	KFC Yum! Center (22,788); Louisville, KY
ACC Tournament
Mar 12; 2:40 pm, ACCN/ESPN	No. 14	vs. No. 19 North Carolina; Quarterfinals	L 60–70	24–8	20 – Rozier	12 – Harrell	6 – Snider	Greensboro Coliseum (22,026); Greensboro, NC
NCAA tournament
Mar 20*; 4:10 pm, TBS	(4 E) No. 17	vs. (13 E) UC Irvine; Second round	W 57–55	25–8	19 – Blackshear	7 – Blackshear	5 – Rozier	KeyArena (14,509); Seattle, WA
Mar 22*; 9:40 pm, TBS	(4 E) No. 17	vs. (5 E) No. 11 Northern Iowa; Third round	W 66–53	26–8	25 – Rozier	6 – Tied	7 – Rozier	KeyArena (14,901); Seattle, WA
Mar 27*; 7:30 pm, TBS	(4 E) No. 17	vs. (8 E) NC State; Sweet Sixteen	W 75–65	27–8	24 – Harrell	14 – Rozler	4 – Tied	Carrier Dome (24,453); Syracuse, NY
Mar 29*; 2:20 pm, CBS	(4 E) No. 17	vs. (7 E) No. 23 Michigan State; Elite Eight	L 70–76 ^{OT}	27–9	28 – Blackshear	9 – Harrell	4 – Harrell	Carrier Dome (24,404); Syracuse, NY
*Non-conference game. ^{#}Rankings from AP Poll. (#) Tournament seedings in parentheses. E=East Region. All times are in Eastern Time.

== Rankings ==
Ranking movement Legend: ██ Increase in ranking. ██ Decrease in ranking. (RV) Received votes but unranked. (NR) Not ranked.
Poll	Pre	2	3	4	5	6	7	8	9	10	11	12	13	14	15	16	17	18	19	Final
AP	8	7	6	5	4	4	4	5	5	6	10	10	9	9	12	17	16	15	18	n/a
Coaches	9	8	5	5	4	4	4	6	5	7	10	9	8	8	12	15	14	13	16	10
