= 2015 Big West Conference men's basketball tournament =

- Classification: Division I
- Season: 2014–15
- Teams: 8
- Site: Honda Center; Anaheim, California
- Champions: UC Irvine (1st title)
- Winning coach: Russell Turner (1st title)
- Television: FS PRIME; ESPN3; ESPNU; ESPN2

2014–15 Big West men's basketball standings
	Conf.				Overall
Team	W		L	PCT	W		L	PCT
UC Davis	14	–	2	.875	25	–	7	.781
UC Irvine †	11	–	5	.688	21	–	13	.618
UC Santa Barbara	11	–	5	.688	19	–	14	.576
Long Beach State	10	–	6	.625	16	–	17	.485
Hawai'i	8	–	8	.500	22	–	13	.629
UC Riverside	7	–	9	.438	14	–	17	.452
Cal Poly	6	–	10	.375	13	–	16	.448
Cal State Northridge	4	–	12	.250	9	–	24	.273
Cal State Fullerton	1	–	15	.063	9	–	22	.290
† 2015 Big West tournament winner

The 2015 Big West Conference men's basketball tournament took place March 12–14, 2015 at the Honda Center in Anaheim, California. The top eight teams qualified for the tournament. In the semifinals, the highest seed played the lowest seed, with two remaining seeds playing each other. The champion received the conference's automatic bid to the 2015 NCAA tournament.

== Bracket ==
Quarterfinals; March 12, 2015; FS PRIME
1	UC Davis	71
8	Cal State Northridge	67
4	Long Beach State	72
5	Hawaii	79
(Pairings are reseeded after the first round)
2	UC Santa Barbara	54
7	Cal Poly	50
3	UC Irvine	63
6	UC Riverside	54

Semifinals; March 13, 2015; ESPNU (re-seeded)
1	UC Davis	58
5	Hawaii	65
2	UC Santa Barbara	63
3	UC Irvine	72

Championship; March 14, 2015; ESPN2
5	Hawaii	58
3	UC Irvine	67
