= 2014–15 Stephen F. Austin Lumberjacks basketball team =

American college basketball season

2014–15 Stephen F. Austin Lumberjacks men's basketball

Southland regular season & tournament champions

NCAA tournament, round of 64
- Conference: Southland Conference
- Record: 0–5, 29 wins vacated (0–1 Southland, 17 wins vacated)
- Head coach: Brad Underwood (2nd season)
- Assistant coaches: Mike Boynton; Stephen Gentry; Erik Pastrana
- Home arena: William R. Johnson Coliseum (Capacity: 7,203)

2014–15 Southland Conference men's basketball standings
	Conf.				Overall
Team	W		L	PCT	W		L	PCT
Stephen F. Austin †	17	–	1	.944	29	–	5	.853
Sam Houston State	15	–	3	.833	26	–	9	.743
Texas A&M–CC	13	–	5	.722	20	–	14	.588
Northwestern State	13	–	5	.722	19	–	13	.594
Incarnate Word**	10	–	8	.556	18	–	11	.621
Lamar*	9	–	9	.500	15	–	15	.500
McNeese State	8	–	10	.444	15	–	16	.484
Houston Baptist*	7	–	11	.389	12	–	16	.429
Nicholls State	7	–	11	.389	10	–	19	.345
New Orleans	6	–	12	.333	11	–	18	.379
Southeastern Louisiana	6	–	12	.333	9	–	23	.281
Abilene Christian**	4	–	14	.222	10	–	21	.323
Central Arkansas*	2	–	16	.111	2	–	27	.069
† 2015 Southland tournament winner * ineligible for postseason due to APR penalties ** ineligible for postseason due to Div. I transition

The 2014–15 Stephen F. Austin Lumberjacks basketball team represented Stephen F. Austin University during the 2014–15 NCAA Division I men's basketball season. The Lumberjacks were led by head coach Brad Underwood and played their home games at the William R. Johnson Coliseum. They were members of the Southland Conference.

The Lumberjacks were picked to finish first (1st) in both the Southland Conference Coaches' Poll and in the Sports Information Directors Poll receiving eleven (11) first place votes in the Coaches' poll and ten (10) first place votes in the SID poll.

They finished the season 29–5, 17–1 in Southland play to win the Southland regular season championship. They defeated Northwestern State and Sam Houston State to become champions of the Southland tournament. They received an automatic bid to the NCAA tournament where they lost in the second round to Utah.

On May 20, 2020, following the discovery of an administrative error in certifying eligibility for student-athletes, Stephen F. Austin reached an agreement with the NCAA to vacate hundreds of wins across multiple sports from 2013 to 2019, including all 117 men's basketball wins from the 2014–15 to 2018–19 seasons.

== Roster ==
2014–15 Stephen F. Austin Lumberjacks men's basketball team
Players
Coaches

Pos.	#	Name	Height	Weight	Year	Previous school	Hometown
G/F	0	Thomas Walkup	6 ft 4 in (1.93 m)	195 lb (88 kg)	RS Jr	Deer Park HS	Pasadena, TX
G	1	Demetrious Floyd	5 ft 11 in (1.8 m)	170 lb (77 kg)	Jr	McCluer HS; Chipola College	St. Louis, MO
G	3	Jared Johnson	6 ft 0 in (1.83 m)	170 lb (77 kg)	Jr	Ridge View HS; Hill College	Columbia, SC
G	4	Ty Charles	6 ft 5 in (1.96 m)	190 lb (86 kg)	Fr	Kennedale HS	Kennedale, TX
G	5	Justin Dotson	6 ft 4 in (1.93 m)	215 lb (98 kg)	So	D. W. Daniel HS	Central, SC
G	10	Trey Pinkney	5 ft 9 in (1.75 m)	160 lb (73 kg)	Jr	Seven Lakes HS	Katy, TX
F	11	Clide Geffrard	6 ft 5 in (1.96 m)	220 lb (100 kg)	Jr	Ely HS; Northwest Florida State College	Pompano Beach, FL
G	12	Dallas Cameron	6 ft 3 in (1.91 m)	180 lb (82 kg)	So	Ely HS	Pompano Beach, FL
F	15	Bobby King	6 ft 7 in (2.01 m)	220 lb (100 kg)	Sr	Woodlawn HS; Florida A&M	Birmingham, AL
G	21	Jason Martin	6 ft 4 in (1.93 m)	190 lb (86 kg)	So	John Paul II HS	Plano, TX
G	25	Jaxon Holden	6 ft 1 in (1.85 m)	180 lb (82 kg)	Fr	Marcus HS	Flower Mound, TX
F	30	Tanner Clayton	6 ft 9 in (2.06 m)	210 lb (95 kg)	Sr	Rancho Bernardo HS; Arizona Western College	San Diego, CA
G/F	31	Connor Brooks	6 ft 4 in (1.93 m)	190 lb (86 kg)	Sr	Manhattan HS; Northern Oklahoma College	Manhattan, KS
G/F	33	Caleb Johnston	6 ft 3 in (1.91 m)	207 lb (94 kg)	Fr	Lee HS	Tyler, TX
F	34	Jacob Parker	6 ft 6 in (1.98 m)	210 lb (95 kg)	Sr	Bixby HS	Bixby, OK

Head coach

- Brad Underwood

Assistant coach(es)

- Mike Boynton, Jr.
- Stephen Gentry
- Erik Pastrana

Legend

- (C) Team captain
- (S) Suspended
- (I) Ineligible
- (W) Walk-on
- Injured
- Current redshirt

Roster
Last update: 09/25/2014

== Schedule ==
Source: Access date: 09/25/2014

Date time, TV	Rank^{#}	Opponent^{#}	Result	Record	Site (attendance) city, state
Out of Conference
11/14/2014*; 7:00 pm		Mississippi College	W 75–49	1–0	William R. Johnson Coliseum (4,975); Nacogdoches, TX
11/18/2014*; 8:00 am, ESPN2		Northern Iowa; ESPN Tip-Off Marathon	L 77–79 ^{OT}	1–1	William R. Johnson Coliseum (7,096); Nacogdoches, TX
11/21/2014*; 7:00 pm, RTSW		at Xavier	L 63–81	1–2	Cintas Center (9,514); Cincinnati, OH
11/24/2014*; 7:00 pm, FSN		at Baylor; Las Vegas Invitational	L 51–67	1–3	Ferrell Center (5,503); Waco, TX
11/27/2014*; 8:00 pm, RTSW		vs. Prairie View A&M; Las Vegas Invitational	W 73–61	2–3	Orleans Arena (355); Paradise, NV
11/28/2014*; 4:00 pm		vs. Austin Peay; Las Vegas Invitational	W 83–62	3–3	Orleans Arena (665); Paradise, NV
12/02/2014*; 6:00 pm, ESPNews		at Memphis; Las Vegas Invitational	W 64–62	4–3	FedExForum (13,201); Memphis, TN
12/05/2014*; 7:00 pm		Long Beach State	W 74–45	5–3	William R. Johnson Coliseum (3,899); Nacogdoches, TX
12/07/2014*; 4:00 pm		Ouachita Baptist	W 84–60	6–3	William R. Johnson Coliseum (2,411); Nacogdoches, TX
12/14/2014*; 3:00 pm		North Texas	W 59–48	7–3	William R. Johnson Coliseum (582); Nacogdoches, TX
12/17/2014*; 7:00 pm		Texas State	W 66–60	8–3	William R. Johnson Coliseum (3,749); Nacogdoches, TX
12/20/2014*; 2:00 pm		Arkansas Tech	W 94–57	9–3	William R. Johnson Coliseum (687); Nacogdoches, TX
12/29/2014*; 8:00 pm		at Cal State Northridge	W 61–57	10–3	Matadome (685); Northridge, CA
Conference Games
01/03/2015; 3:00 pm		McNeese State	W 80–75	11–3 (1–0)	Burton Coliseum (1,417); Lake Charles, LA
01/05/2015; 8:00 pm		Southeastern Louisiana	W 81–66	12–3 (2–0)	William R. Johnson Coliseum (2,183); Nacogdoches, TX
01/13/2015; 7:00 pm		at Central Arkansas	W 109–58	13–3 (3–0)	Farris Center (875); Conway, AR
01/17/2015; 11:00 am, CBSSN		at Abilene Christian	W 82–64	14–3 (4–0)	Moody Coliseum (2,874); Abilene, TX
01/19/2015; 7:00 pm		New Orleans	W 79–54	15–3 (5–0)	William R. Johnson Coliseum (5,124); Nacogdoches, TX
01/24/2015; 4:00 pm		at Sam Houston State	W 79–68	16–3 (6–0)	Bernard Johnson Coliseum (3,607); Huntsville, TX
01/26/2015; 7:00 pm		at Lamar	W 82–65	17–3 (7–0)	Montagne Center (2,412); Beaumont, TX
01/31/2015; 6:00 pm		Texas A&M–Corpus Christi	W 61–51	18–3 (8–0)	William R. Johnson Coliseum (5,512); Nacogdoches, TX
02/07/2015; 6:00 pm		Houston Baptist	W 95–59	19–3 (9–0)	William R. Johnson Coliseum (5,116); Nacogdoches, TX
02/09/2015; 6:30 pm		at Northwestern State	W 93–82	20–3 (10–0)	Prather Coliseum (3,612); Natchitoches, LA
02/14/2015; 3:30 pm, ESPN3		at Texas A&M–Corpus Christi	L 63–71	20–4 (10–1)	American Bank Center (1,324); Corpus Christi, TX
02/16/2015; 7:00 pm		at Incarnate Word	W 90–76	21–4 (11–1)	McDermott Center (1,112); San Antonio, TX
02/21/2015; 6:00 pm		Nicholls State	W 86–71	22–4 (12–1)	William R. Johnson Coliseum (4,716); Nacogdoches, TX
02/23/2015; 7:00 pm		Lamar	W 103–74	23–4 (13–1)	William R. Johnson Coliseum (2,744); Nacogdoches, TX
02/28/2015; 7:00 pm		at Houston Baptist	W 102–87	24–4 (14–1)	Sharp Gym (1,046); Houston, TX
03/02/2015; 7:00 pm		Incarnate Word	W 83–62	25–4 (15–1)	William R. Johnson Coliseum (3,194); Nacogdoches, TX
03/05/2015; 8:00 pm, ESPN3		Northwestern State	W 92–66	26–4 (16–1)	William R. Johnson Coliseum (5,838); Nacogdoches, TX
03/07/2015; 6:00 pm		Sam Houston State	W 64–55	27–4 (17–1)	William R. Johnson Coliseum (7,328); Nacogdoches, TX
Southland tournament
03/13/2015; 5:00 pm, ESPN3	(1)	vs. (4) Northwestern State; Semifinals	W 91–79	28–4	Merrell Center (3,268); Katy, TX
03/14/2015; 8:30 pm, ESPN2	(1)	vs. (2) Sam Houston State; Championship	W 83–70	29–4	Merrell Center (5,016); Katy, TX
NCAA tournament
3/19/2015*; 6:27 pm, truTV	(12 S)	vs. (5 S) No. 19 Utah; Second round	L 50–57	29–5	Moda Center (14,279); Portland, OR
*Non-conference game. ^{#}Rankings from AP Poll. (#) Tournament seedings in parentheses. All times are in Central Time. (#) during NCAA Tournament is seed with Region S=South.

== See also ==
- 2014–15 Stephen F. Austin Ladyjacks basketball team
- List of vacated and forfeited games in college basketball
