= 2014–15 Cal State Northridge Matadors men's basketball team =

American college basketball season

2014–15 Cal State Northridge Matadors men's basketball
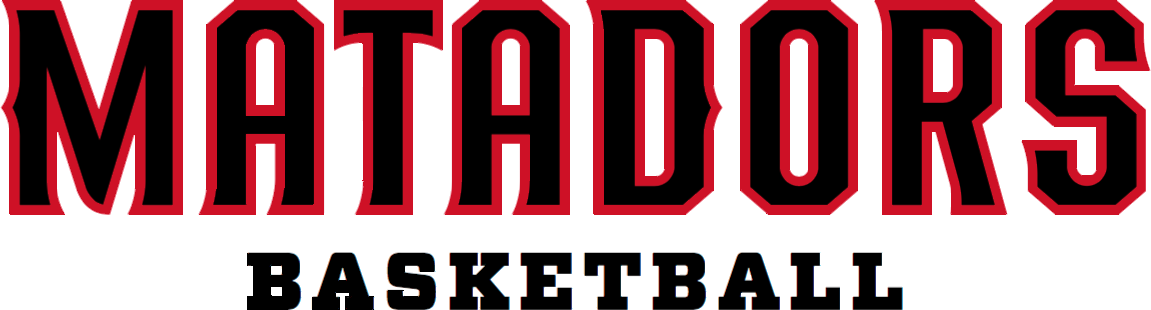
- Conference: Big West Conference
- Record: 9–24 (4–12 Big West)
- Head coach: Reggie Theus (2nd season)
- Assistant coaches: Chris Pompey; Jason Levy; Jay Morris
- Home arena: Matadome

2014–15 Big West men's basketball standings
	Conf.				Overall
Team	W		L	PCT	W		L	PCT
UC Davis	14	–	2	.875	25	–	7	.781
UC Irvine †	11	–	5	.688	21	–	13	.618
UC Santa Barbara	11	–	5	.688	19	–	14	.576
Long Beach State	10	–	6	.625	16	–	17	.485
Hawai'i	8	–	8	.500	22	–	13	.629
UC Riverside	7	–	9	.438	14	–	17	.452
Cal Poly	6	–	10	.375	13	–	16	.448
Cal State Northridge	4	–	12	.250	9	–	24	.273
Cal State Fullerton	1	–	15	.063	9	–	22	.290
† 2015 Big West tournament winner

The 2014–15 Cal State Northridge Matadors men's basketball team represented California State University, Northridge during the 2014–15 NCAA Division I men's basketball season. The Matadors, led by second year head coach Reggie Theus, played their home games at the Matadome as members of the Big West Conference. They finished the season 9–24, 4–12 in Big West play to finish in eighth place. They lost in the first round of the Big West tournament to UC Davis.

== Roster ==
2014–15 Cal State Northridge Matadors men's basketball team
Players
Coaches

Pos.	#	Name	Height	Weight	Year	Previous school	Hometown
G	0	Taelin Webb	6 ft 0 in (1.83 m)	175 lb (79 kg)	Fr	Roosevelt HS	Fresno, CA
G	1	Micheal Warren	6 ft 4 in (1.93 m)	180 lb (82 kg)	Fr	Theodore Roosevelt HS	Washington, D.C.
G	2	Landon Drew	6 ft 1 in (1.85 m)	175 lb (79 kg)	Jr	Fairfax HS	Los Angeles, CA
G/F	3	Stephan Hicks	6 ft 6 in (1.98 m)	200 lb (91 kg)	RS Sr	National College Prep	Thousand Oaks, CA
F	4	Tavrion Dawson	6 ft 8 in (2.03 m)	205 lb (93 kg)	Fr	Gardena Serra HS	Long Beach, CA
F	5	Zacarry Douglas	6 ft 8 in (2.03 m)	205 lb (93 kg)	Fr	Mt. Zion Prep	Landover, MD
F/C	11	Tre Hale-Edmerson	6 ft 7 in (2.01 m)	215 lb (98 kg)	Jr	Stoneridge Prep	Sheridan, OR
G	12	Robert Cid	5 ft 10 in (1.78 m)	160 lb (73 kg)	Sr	Santa Barbara City College	Santa Barbara, CA
G	13	Ajon Efferson	6 ft 0 in (1.83 m)	160 lb (73 kg)	Fr	Pasadena HS	Pasadena, CA
G	14	Aaron Parks	6 ft 3 in (1.91 m)	198 lb (90 kg)	Fr	Lake Clifton HS	Baltimore, MD
F	15	Devonte Elliott	6 ft 10 in (2.08 m)	220 lb (100 kg)	RS Sr	Paramount HS; Nevada	Paramount, CA
F	21	Stephen Maxwell	6 ft 7 in (2.01 m)	220 lb (100 kg)	Jr	Taft HS	Woodland Hills, CA
G	23	Jerron Wilbut	6 ft 3 in (1.91 m)	185 lb (84 kg)	Fr	Downers Grove South HS	Chicago, IL
F	24	Jibreel Faulkner	6 ft 8 in (2.03 m)	200 lb (91 kg)	Fr	Theodore Roosevelt HS	Washington, D.C.
C	32	Kevin Johnson	6 ft 10 in (2.08 m)	240 lb (109 kg)	RS Jr	Taft HS; Seton Hall	Los Angeles, CA
G	33	Miles Nolen-Webb	6 ft 0 in (1.83 m)	180 lb (82 kg)	Fr	Hoover HS	San Diego, CA

Head coach

- Reggie Theus (UNLV)

Assistant coach(es)

- Chris Pompey (Pittsburgh)
- Jason Levy (Cal State Northridge)
- Jay Morris (Cal State Dominguez Hills)

Legend

- (C) Team captain
- (S) Suspended
- (I) Ineligible
- (W) Walk-on
- Injured
- Current redshirt

Roster

== Schedule and results ==
Date time, TV	Opponent	Result	Record	Site (attendance) city, state
Exhibition
11/08/2014*; 7:00 pm	Cal State Dominguez Hills	W 79–76		Matadome (947); Northridge, CA
Regular season
11/14/2014*; 7:00 pm, FSSD	at No. 16 San Diego State; Maui Invitational Tournament	L 58–79	0–1	Viejas Arena (12,414); San Diego, CA
11/16/2014*; 7:00 pm, P12N	at No. 2 Arizona; Maui Invitational Tournament	L 68–86	1–1	McKale Center (14,655); Tucson, AZ
11/19/2014*; 7:00 pm	Montana State	W 72–65	1–2	Matadome (1,790); Northridge, CA
11/22/2014*; 11:00 am	vs. Samford; Maui Invitational Tournament	W 79–72	2–2	Jack Stephens Center (647); Little Rock, AR
11/23/2014*; 11:00 am	at Arkansas–Little Rock; Maui Invitational Tournament	L 88–94 ^{2OT}	2–3	Jack Stephens Center (549); Little Rock, AR
11/26/2014*; 8:00 pm	Portland State	L 55–63	2–4	Matadome (555); Northridge, CA
11/29/2014*; 7:00 pm	at Seattle	L 58–70	2–5	KeyArena (1,517); Seattle, WA
12/02/2014*; 7:00 pm	South Dakota	L 65–68	2–6	Matadome (805); Northridge, CA
12/04/2014*; 7:00 pm	at Pepperdine	L 56–66	2–7	Firestone Fieldhouse (1,511); Malibu, CA
12/06/2014*; 7:00 pm	Vanguard	W 70–58	3–7	Matadome (823); Northridge, CA
12/17/2014*; 8:00 pm, P12N	at Oregon	L 56–79	3–8	Matthew Knight Arena (4,914); Eugene, OR
12/20/2014*; 7:00 pm	Texas A&M–Corpus Christi	L 68–75	3–9	Matadome (550); Northridge, CA
12/23/2014*; 4:00 pm, ESPNU	at No. 4 Louisville	L 55–80	3–10	KFC Yum! Center (20,231); Louisville, KY
12/29/2014*; 7:00 pm	Stephen F. Austin	L 57–61	3–11	Matadome (685); Northridge, CA
01/02/2015*; 7:00 pm	Morgan State	W 78–62	4–11	Matadome (603); Northridge, CA
01/07/2015; 7:00 pm	at UC Davis	L 61–71	4–12 (0–1)	The Pavilion (1,935); Davis, CA
01/10/2015; 9:00 pm	at Hawaii	L 68–83	4–13 (0–2)	Stan Sheriff Center (6,805); Honolulu, HI
01/15/2015; 7:00 pm	at UC Santa Barbara	W 74–63	5–13 (1–2)	The Thunderdome (2,023); Santa Barbara, CA
01/17/2015; 7:00 pm	Cal Poly	W 55–48	6–13 (2–2)	Matadome (1,084); Northridge, CA
01/22/2015; 7:00 pm, ESPN3	UC Irvine	L 49–80	6–14 (2–3)	Matadome (1,311); Northridge, CA
01/24/2015; 7:00 pm, ESPN3	Long Beach State	L 58–64	6–15 (2–4)	Matadome (1,395); Northridge, CA
01/29/2015; 7:00 pm	Hawaii	L 73–84	6–16 (2–5)	Matadome (1,127); Northridge, CA
01/31/2015; 5:00 pm	at UC Riverside	L 62–66	6–17 (2–6)	UC Riverside Student Recreation Center (579); Riverside, CA
02/05/2015; 7:00 pm	at Cal State Fullerton	L 53–69	6–18 (2–7)	Titan Gym (882); Fullerton, CA
02/07/2015; 7:00 pm	UC Davis	L 55–68	6–19 (2–8)	Matadome (1,025); Northridge, CA
02/12/2015; 7:00 pm	at Cal Poly	L 63–70	6–20 (2–9)	Mott Gym (2,113); San Luis Obispo, CA
02/14/2015; 7:00 pm	UC Santa Barbara	L 57–65	6–21 (2–10)	Matadome (897); Northridge, CA
02/17/2015*; 7:00 pm	Bethesda	W 89–61	7–21	Matadome (N/A); Northridge, CA
02/21/2015; 7:00 pm	at UC Irvine	L 58–67	7–22 (2–11)	Bren Events Center (3,070); Irvine, CA
02/26/2015; 7:00 pm	Cal State Fullerton	W 82–72	8–22 (3–11)	Matadome (1,017); Northridge, CA
02/28/2015; 7:00 pm	UC Riverside	W 83–76	9–22 (4–11)	Matadome (1,600); Northridge, CA
03/05/2015; 7:00 pm, ESPN3	at Long Beach State	L 58–69	9–23 (4–12)	Walter Pyramid (3,255); Long Beach, CA
Big West tournament
03/12/2015; 3:00 pm	vs. UC Davis	L 67–71	9–24	Honda Center; Anaheim, CA
*Non-conference game. ^{#}Rankings from AP Poll. (#) Tournament seedings in parentheses. All times are in Pacific Time.
