= 2014–15 UC Santa Barbara Gauchos men's basketball team =

American college basketball season

2014–15 UC Santa Barbara Gauchos men's basketball

CBI, first round
- Conference: Big West Conference
- Record: 19–14 (11–5 Big West)
- Head coach: Bob Williams (17th season)
- Assistant coaches: Matt Stock; Kevin Bromley; Ryan Madry
- Home arena: The Thunderdome

2014–15 Big West men's basketball standings
	Conf.				Overall
Team	W		L	PCT	W		L	PCT
UC Davis	14	–	2	.875	25	–	7	.781
UC Irvine †	11	–	5	.688	21	–	13	.618
UC Santa Barbara	11	–	5	.688	19	–	14	.576
Long Beach State	10	–	6	.625	16	–	17	.485
Hawai'i	8	–	8	.500	22	–	13	.629
UC Riverside	7	–	9	.438	14	–	17	.452
Cal Poly	6	–	10	.375	13	–	16	.448
Cal State Northridge	4	–	12	.250	9	–	24	.273
Cal State Fullerton	1	–	15	.063	9	–	22	.290
† 2015 Big West tournament winner

The 2014–15 UC Santa Barbara Gauchos men's basketball team represented the University of California, Santa Barbara during the 2014–15 NCAA Division I men's basketball season. The Gauchos, led by 17th-year head coach Bob Williams, played their home games at the UC Santa Barbara Events Center, nicknamed The Thunderdome, as members of the Big West Conference. They finished the season 19–14, 11–5 in Big West play, to finish in a tie for second place. They advanced to the semifinals of the Big West tournament where they lost to UC Irvine. They were invited to the College Basketball Invitational where they lost in the first round to Oral Roberts.

== Roster ==
2014–15 UC Santa Barbara Gauchos men's basketball team
Players
Coaches

Pos.	#	Name	Height	Weight	Year	Previous school	Hometown
G	0	Hunter Ford (W)	6 ft 3 in (1.91 m)	180 lb (82 kg)	RS So	Oakmont HS	Roseville, CA
G	1	Eric Childress	6 ft 0 in (1.83 m)	175 lb (79 kg)	So	Leuzinger HS	Hawthorne, CA
G	2	Gabe Vincent	6 ft 3 in (1.91 m)	190 lb (86 kg)	Fr	St. Mary's HS	Stockton, CA
G	3	Zalmico Harmon	6 ft 0 in (1.83 m)	185 lb (84 kg)	Sr	Ballou HS; Ventura CC	Washington, D.C.
G	4	Aamahd Walker	6 ft 2 in (1.88 m)	190 lb (86 kg)	RS So	Culver City HS	Culver City, CA
G	5	Tide Osifeso	5 ft 10 in (1.78 m)	145 lb (66 kg)	Fr	Los Osos HS	Rancho Cucamonga, CA
G	11	T. J. Taylor	5 ft 9 in (1.75 m)	160 lb (73 kg)	Sr	Oakland HS	Oakland, CA
F	12	Alex Hart	6 ft 10 in (2.08 m)	215 lb (98 kg)	So	Immaculata HS	Kelowna, BC
G	13	DaJuan Smith	6 ft 3 in (1.91 m)	175 lb (79 kg)	Jr	Abbeville HS; Mount San Jacinto College	Abbeville, LA
F	14	Ami Lakoju	6 ft 8 in (2.03 m)	265 lb (120 kg)	Fr	St. Luke's School	Harlem, NY
C	15	Alan Williams	6 ft 8 in (2.03 m)	265 lb (120 kg)	Sr	North HS	Phoenix, AZ
G	20	Logan Louks	6 ft 2 in (1.88 m)	175 lb (79 kg)	Jr	San Ramon Valley HS; Santa Barbara City College	Danville, CA
F	21	Mitch Brewe	6 ft 8 in (2.03 m)	242 lb (110 kg)	Jr	Seattle Preparatory School	Seattle, WA
G	23	Sam Walters	6 ft 2 in (1.88 m)	170 lb (77 kg)	Fr	Soquel HS	Soquel, CA
G	24	Michael Bryson	6 ft 4 in (1.93 m)	201 lb (91 kg)	Jr	Foothill HS	Sacramento, CA
G/F	25	Justin Burks	6 ft 6 in (1.98 m)	210 lb (95 kg)	Fr	Arbor View HS	Las Vegas, NV
G/F	31	John Green	6 ft 5 in (1.96 m)	180 lb (82 kg)	RS Jr	Westwind Preparatory Academy	Oakland, CA
F	32	J. D. Slajchert	6 ft 6 in (1.98 m)	215 lb (98 kg)	Fr	Phillips Exeter Academy	Oak Park, CA
G	43	Joey Goodreault	6 ft 3 in (1.91 m)	175 lb (79 kg)	Fr	Miramonte HS	Orinda, CA
F	44	Sam Beeler	6 ft 10 in (2.08 m)	210 lb (95 kg)	Jr	Poway HS	Poway, CA

Head coach

- Bob Williams (San José State)

Assistant coach(es)

- Matt Stock (UC Santa Barbara)
- Kevin Bromley (Colorado State)
- Ryan Madry (West Georgia)

Legend

- (C) Team captain
- (S) Suspended
- (I) Ineligible
- (W) Walk-on
- Injured
- Current redshirt

Roster
Last update: June 27, 2024

== Schedule and results ==
Date time, TV	Opponent	Result	Record	Site (attendance) city, state
Exhibition
11/10/2014*; 7:00 p.m.	Point Loma Nazarene	W 70–54		The Thunderdome; Santa Barbara, CA
Non-conference games
11/14/2014*; 5:00 p.m., ESPN3	at No. 5 Kansas	L 59–69	0–1	Allen Fieldhouse (16,300); Lawrence, KS
11/17/2014*; 4:00 p.m., ESPN3	at Florida Gulf Coast	L 75–81	1–1	Alico Arena (4,412); Fort Myers, FL
11/22/2014*; 7:00 p.m.	The Master's College	W 91–45	2–1	The Thunderdome (1,679); Santa Barbara, CA
11/27/2014*; 9:00 p.m., CBSSN	vs. Washington State; Great Alaska Shootout quarterfinals	W 71–43	2–2	Alaska Airlines Center (2,588); Anchorage, AK
11/28/2014*; 9:00 p.m., CBSSN	vs. Mercer; Great Alaska Shootout semifinals	W 66–60 ^{OT}	3–2	Alaska Airlines Center (3,224); Anchorage, AK
11/29/2014*; 8:30 p.m., CBSSN	vs. Colorado State; Great Alaska Shootout championship	L 63–65	3–3	Alaska Airlines Center (3,363); Anchorage, AK
12/04/2014*; 7:30 p.m.	Seattle	W 87–46	4–3	The Thunderdome (2,518); Santa Barbara, CA
12/08/2014*; 5:00 p.m., CBSSN	at SMU	L 73–80 ^{OT}	4–4	Moody Coliseum (6,852); Dallas, TX
12/11/2014*; 7:00 p.m.	San Diego	L 65–79	4–5	The Thunderdome (1,431); Santa Barbara, CA
12/19/2014*; 4:00 p.m.	San Diego Christian	W 69–46	5–5	The Thunderdome (1,233); Santa Barbara, CA
12/22/2014*; 6:00 p.m., P12N	at Oregon	L 78–82 ^{OT}	5–6	Matthew Knight Arena (5,396); Eugene, OR
12/30/2014*; 6:30 p.m., P12N	at Oregon State	L 64–76	5–7	Gill Coliseum (4,803); Corvallis, OR
01/02/2015*; 7:00 p.m.	Vermont	W 64–57	6–7	The Thunderdome (1,966); Santa Barbara, CA
01/04/2015*; 7:00 p.m.	Florida Gulf Coast	W 63–50	7–7	The Thunderdome (2,887); Santa Barbara, CA
Conference games
01/10/2015; 7:00 p.m., ESPNU	at Cal Poly	W 50–45	8–7 (1–0)	Mott Gym (3,032); San Luis Obispo, CA
01/15/2015; 7:00 p.m.	Cal State Northridge	L 63–74	8–8 (1–1)	The Thunderdome (2,023); Santa Barbara, CA
01/17/2015; 4:00 p.m., ESPN3	at Long Beach State	L 53–69	8–9 (1–2)	Walter Pyramid (4,258); Long Beach, CA
01/22/2015; 7:00 p.m.	UC Riverside	W 83–75	9–9 (2–2)	The Thunderdome (1,486); Santa Barbara, CA
01/24/2015; 4:00 p.m.	Cal State Fullerton	W 68–49	10–9 (3–2)	The Thunderdome (2,216); Santa Barbara, CA
01/29/2015; 7:00 p.m.	at UC Davis	L 64–70	10–10 (3–3)	The Pavilion (3,081); Davis, CA
01/31/2015; 7:00 p.m.	at UC Irvine	L 55–77	10–11 (3–4)	Bren Events Center (3,773); Irvine, CA
02/07/2015; 7:00 p.m., ESPNU	Hawaii	W 75–74	11–11 (4–4)	The Thunderdome (4,383); Santa Barbara, CA
02/12/2015; 7:30 p.m., Prime Ticket	Long Beach State	W 70–55	12–11 (5–4)	The Thunderdome (4,116); Santa Barbara, CA
02/14/2015; 7:00 p.m.	at Cal State Northridge	W 65–57	13–11 (6–4)	Matadome (897); Northridge, CA
02/19/2015; 7:00 p.m., ESPN3	at UC Riverside	L 62–64	13–12 (6–5)	UC Riverside Student Recreation Center (845); Riverside, CA
02/21/2015; 5:00 p.m., ESPN3	at Cal State Fullerton	W 69–54	14–12 (7–5)	Titan Gym (1,089); Fullerton, CA
02/26/2015; 7:00 p.m.	UC Davis	W 74–60	15–12 (8–5)	The Thunderdome (2,823); Santa Barbara, CA
02/28/2015; 9:00 p.m., ESPN2	UC Irvine	W 54–51	16–12 (9–5)	The Thunderdome (4,716); Santa Barbara, CA
03/04/2015; 12:00 a.m.	at Hawaii	W 98–90	17–12 (10-5)	Stan Sheriff Center (7,066); Honolulu, HI
03/07/2015; 3:00 p.m., Prime Ticket	Cal Poly	W 64–56	18–12 (11-5)	The Thunderdome (5,414); Santa Barbara, CA
Big West tournament
03/12/2015; 11:30 a.m.	vs. Cal Poly; Quarterfinals	W 54–50	19–12	Honda Center (3,867); Anaheim, CA
03/13/2015; 11:59 p.m., ESPNU	vs. UC Irvine; Semifinals	L 63–72	19–13	Honda Center (4,322); Anaheim, CA
College Basketball Invitational
03/18/2015*; 5:00 p.m.	at Oral Roberts; First round	L 87–91	19–14	Mabee Center (1,687); Tulsa, OK
*Non-conference game. ^{#}Rankings from AP poll. (#) Tournament seedings in parentheses. All times are in Pacific.
