= 2014–15 Hawaii Rainbow Warriors basketball team =

American college basketball season

2014–15 Hawaii Rainbow Warriors men's basketball
- Conference: Big West Conference
- Record: 22–13 (8–8 Big West)
- Head coach: Benjy Taylor (Interim, 1st season)
- Assistant coaches: Brad Autry; Senque Carey; Brandon Loyd; Jamie Smith (Director of Basketball Operations)
- Home arena: Stan Sheriff Center

2014–15 Big West men's basketball standings
	Conf.				Overall
Team	W		L	PCT	W		L	PCT
UC Davis	14	–	2	.875	25	–	7	.781
UC Irvine †	11	–	5	.688	21	–	13	.618
UC Santa Barbara	11	–	5	.688	19	–	14	.576
Long Beach State	10	–	6	.625	16	–	17	.485
Hawai'i	8	–	8	.500	22	–	13	.629
UC Riverside	7	–	9	.438	14	–	17	.452
Cal Poly	6	–	10	.375	13	–	16	.448
Cal State Northridge	4	–	12	.250	9	–	24	.273
Cal State Fullerton	1	–	15	.063	9	–	22	.290
† 2015 Big West tournament winner

The 2014–15 Hawaii Rainbow Warriors basketball team represented the University of Hawaii at Manoa during the 2014–15 NCAA Division I men's basketball season. The Rainbow Warriors, led by interim head coach Benjy Taylor, played their home games at the Stan Sheriff Center as members of the Big West Conference. On October 28, 2014, Gib Arnold was removed as coach at Hawaii following an NCAA investigation. Assistant Benjy Taylor was named interim head coach. Despite a 22 win season and being the runner up in their conference tournament, the Warriors didn't play in a postseason tournament. Taylor was not retained after the season.

== Roster ==
2014–15 Hawaii Rainbow Warriors men's basketball team
Players
Coaches

Pos.	#	Name	Height	Weight	Year	Previous school	Hometown
G	0	Isaac Fleming	6 ft 3 in (1.91 m)	180 lb (82 kg)	Fr	Massanutten Military Academy	Wilmington, Delaware
G	1	Garrett Nevels	6 ft 2 in (1.88 m)	190 lb (86 kg)	Sr	Palisades Charter HS; Mount San Antonio College	Los Angeles, CA
G	2	Niko Filipovich	6 ft 0 in (1.83 m)	160 lb (73 kg)	RS Fr	Bishop Montgomery HS	Rancho Palos Verdes, California
G	3	Brandon Jawato	6 ft 4 in (1.93 m)	200 lb (91 kg)	Jr	El Segundo HS	El Segundo, California
G	5	Roderick Bobbitt	6 ft 3 in (1.91 m)	205 lb (93 kg)	Jr	Castro Valley HS; Indian Hills CC	Oakland, California
G	10	Dyrbe Enos	5 ft 10 in (1.78 m)	170 lb (77 kg)	RS So	Kamehameha Schools-Kapalama	Aiea, HI
G	11	Quincy Smith	6 ft 1 in (1.85 m)	180 lb (82 kg)	Jr	Deer Valley HS; City College of San Francisco	Antioch, CA
F	12	Sammis Reyes	6 ft 6 in (1.98 m)	240 lb (109 kg)	Fr	North Broward Prep	Santiago, Chile
G	14	Negus Webster-Chan	6 ft 7 in (2.01 m)	205 lb (93 kg)	RS So	Huntington Prep; Missouri	Scarborough, ON
C	15	Stefan Jovanovic	6 ft 10 in (2.08 m)	235 lb (107 kg)	So	Bishop Montgomery HS	Kraljevo, Serbia
G	21	Brocke Stepteau	5 ft 9 in (1.75 m)	160 lb (73 kg)	Fr	Dallas Jesuit Prep School	Dallas, TX
G	23	Aaron Valdes	6 ft 5 in (1.96 m)	190 lb (86 kg)	RS So	La Serna HS	Whittier, California
G	24	Zach Buscher	6 ft 3 in (1.91 m)	165 lb (75 kg)	Fr	ʻIolani School	Kailua, HI
F	25	Mike Thomas	6 ft 7 in (2.01 m)	210 lb (95 kg)	So	El Camino Real HS	Woodland Hills, California
F	33	Stefan Jankovic	6 ft 11 in (2.11 m)	235 lb (107 kg)	So	Huntington Prep; Missouri	Mississauga, Ontario

Head coach

- Benjy Taylor (Richmond)

Assistant coach(es)

- Brad Autry (Northwestern Oklahoma State)
- Senque Carey (New Mexico)
- Brandon Loyd (UCLA)
- Jamie Smith (North Carolina) - Director of Basketball Operations
- Nick Jones (Kansas State) - Graduate Manager

Legend

- (C) Team captain
- (S) Suspended
- (I) Ineligible
- (W) Walk-on
- Injured
- Current redshirt

Roster

== Schedule and results ==
Date time, TV	Rank^{#}	Opponent^{#}	Result	Record	Site (attendance) city, state
Exhibition
11/06/2014*; 7:00 pm		Hawaiʻi Pacific	W 62–55		Stan Sheriff Center (5,154); Honolulu
Non-conference games
11/14/2014*; 7:30 pm		Arkansas–Pine Bluff; Outrigger Hotels Rainbow Classic	W 85–57	1–0	Stan Sheriff Center (5,875); Honolulu
11/15/2014*; 7:30 pm		Cal State Bakersfield; Outrigger Hotels Rainbow Classic	W 72–65	2–0	Stan Sheriff Center (6,070); Honolulu
11/18/2014*; 12:00 am, ESPN2		High Point; Outrigger Hotels Rainbow Classic/ESPN Tip-Off Marathon	L 54–62	2–1	Stan Sheriff Center (5,805); Honolulu
11/19/2014*; 7:00 pm		UH Hilo; Gulf Coast Showcase Opening Round	W 89–71	3–1	Stan Sheriff Center (4,599); Honolulu
11/21/2014*; 7:00 pm		vs. Pittsburgh	W 74–70	4–1	Hawaii War Memorial Gym (1,203); Wailuku, Hawaii
11/24/2014*; 3:30 pm		vs. San Francisco; Gulf Coast Showcase quarterfinals	L 73–88	4–2	Germain Arena (2,118); Estero, Florida
11/25/2014*; 9:30 am		vs. Marist; Gulf Coast Showcase consolation round	W 62–55	5–2	Germain Arena (240); Estero, FL
11/26/2014*; 9:30 am		vs. East Carolina; Gulf Coast Showcase 5th place game	W 75–73	6–2	Germain Arena (271); Estero, FL
12/02/2014*; 7:00 pm		Delaware State	W 75–60	7–2	Stan Sheriff Center (4,745); Honolulu
12/06/2014*; 12:00 pm, BYUtv		vs. BYU	L 70–90	7–3	EnergySolutions Arena (13,623); Salt Lake City
12/19/2014*; 7:00 pm		vs. Chaminade	W 94–63	8–3	Blaisdell Center (927); Honolulu
12/22/2014*; 8:00 pm, ESPNU		Nebraska; Diamond Head Classic quarterfinals	W 66–58	9–3	Stan Sheriff Center (8,448); Honolulu
12/23/2014*; 4:00 pm, ESPN2		No. 11 Wichita State; Diamond Head Classic semifinals	L 79–80 ^{OT}	9–4	Stan Sheriff Center (7,140); Honolulu
12/25/2014*; 1:30 pm, ESPN2		Colorado; Diamond Head Classic 3rd place game	W 69–66	10–4	Stan Sheriff Center (5,125); Honolulu
12/29/2014*; 7:00 pm		Southern	W 71–57	11–4	Stan Sheriff Center (5,945); Honolulu
12/30/2014*; 7:00 pm		Prairie View A&M	W 76–68	12–4	Stan Sheriff Center (5,144); Honolulu
Conference games
01/07/2015; 7:00 pm		Cal Poly	L 57–61 ^{OT}	12–5 (0–1)	Stan Sheriff Center (6,219); Honolulu
01/10/2015; 7:00 pm		Cal State Northridge	W 83–68	13–5 (1–1)	Stan Sheriff Center (6,805); Honolulu
01/17/2015; 3:00 pm, ESPNU		at UC Riverside	L 62–66	13–6 (1–2)	UC Riverside Student Recreation Center (1,167); Riverside, California
01/22/2015; 7:00 pm		UC Davis	W 84–76	14–6 (2–2)	Stan Sheriff Center (5,739); Honolulu
01/24/2015; 7:00 pm		UC Irvine	L 72–78	14–7 (2–3)	Stan Sheriff Center (8,761); Honolulu
01/29/2015; 5:00 pm		at Cal State Northridge	W 84–73	15–7 (3–3)	Matadome (1,127); Northridge, CA
01/31/2015; 2:00 pm, ESPN3		at Long Beach State	L 50–65	15–8 (3–4)	Walter Pyramid (3,351); Long Beach, California
02/05/2015; 5:00 pm		at Cal Poly	W 59–56	16–8 (4–4)	Mott Gym (2,876); San Luis Obispo, California
02/07/2015; 5:00 pm, ESPNU		at UC Santa Barbara	L 74–75	16–9 (4–5)	The Thunderdome (4,383); Santa Barbara, California
02/12/2015; 7:00 pm		UC Riverside	W 73–52	17–9 (5–5)	Stan Sheriff Center (5,715); Honolulu
02/14/2015; 7:00 pm		Cal State Fullerton	W 81–61	18–9 (6–5)	Stan Sheriff Center (7,475); Honolulu
02/19/2015; 5:30 pm		at UC Irvine	L 60–75	18–10 (6–6)	Bren Events Center (1,810); Irvine, California
02/21/2015; 5:00 pm		at UC Davis	L 67–74	18–11 (6–7)	The Pavilion (3,657); Davis, California
02/26/2015; 7:00 pm		Long Beach State	W 78–59	19–11 (7–7)	Stan Sheriff Center (6,448); Honolulu
03/05/2015; 7:00 pm, OC Sports		UC Santa Barbara	W 98-90	19-12 (7-8)	Stan Sheriff Center (7,660); Honolulu
03/07/2015; 3:00 pm, ESPN3		at Cal State Fullerton	W 91-70	20-12 (8-8)	Titan Gym (860); Fullerton, California
Big West tournament
03/12/2015; 12:30 pm, Prime Ticket		vs. Long Beach State; Quarterfinals	W 79-72	21-12	Honda Center (n/a); Anaheim, California
03/13/2015; 4:30 pm, ESPN3		vs. UC Davis; Semifinals	W 65-58	22-12	Honda Center (n/a); Anaheim, California
03/14/2015; 6:30 pm, ESPN2		vs. UC Irvine; Finals	L 58-67	22-13	Honda Center (5,463); Anaheim, California
*Non-conference game. ^{#}Rankings from AP Poll. (#) Tournament seedings in parentheses. All times are in Hawaii–Aleutian.
