= 2014–15 Cal State Fullerton Titans men's basketball team =

American college basketball season

2014–15 Cal State Fullerton Titans men's basketball
- Conference: Big West Conference
- Record: 9–22 (1–15 Big West)
- Head coach: Dedrique Taylor (2nd season)
- Assistant coaches: John Smith; Robert Spence; Danny Sprinkle
- Home arena: Titan Gym

2014–15 Big West men's basketball standings
| | Conf. | | | | Overall |
| Team | W | | L | PCT | W | | L | PCT |
|---|---|---|---|---|---|---|---|---|
| UC Davis | 14 | – | 2 | .875 | 25 | – | 7 | .781 |
| UC Irvine † | 11 | – | 5 | .688 | 21 | – | 13 | .618 |
| UC Santa Barbara | 11 | – | 5 | .688 | 19 | – | 14 | .576 |
| Long Beach State | 10 | – | 6 | .625 | 16 | – | 17 | .485 |
| Hawai'i | 8 | – | 8 | .500 | 22 | – | 13 | .629 |
| UC Riverside | 7 | – | 9 | .438 | 14 | – | 17 | .452 |
| Cal Poly | 6 | – | 10 | .375 | 13 | – | 16 | .448 |
| Cal State Northridge | 4 | – | 12 | .250 | 9 | – | 24 | .273 |
| Cal State Fullerton | 1 | – | 15 | .063 | 9 | – | 22 | .290 |
† 2015 Big West tournament winner

The 2014–15 Cal State Fullerton Titans men's basketball team represented California State University, Fullerton during the 2014–15 NCAA Division I men's basketball season. The Titans, led by second year head coach Dedrique Taylor, played their home games at Titan Gym as members of the Big West Conference. They finished the season 9–22, 1–15 in Big West play to finish in last place. They failed to qualify for the Big West tournament.

== Roster ==
2014–15 Cal State Fullerton Titans men's basketball team
Players
Coaches

| Pos. | # | Name | Height | Weight | Year | Previous school | Hometown |
|---|---|---|---|---|---|---|---|
| G | 1 | Tre Coggins (redshirt) | 6 ft 2 in (1.88 m) | 185 lb (84 kg) | Jr | JSerra Catholic HS; Air Force | San Juan Capistrano, CA |
| G | 2 | Jordan Mason | 6 ft 2 in (1.88 m) | 175 lb (79 kg) | RS So | Ennis HS; Colorado State | Ennis, TX |
| F | 3 | Moses Morgan | 6 ft 6 in (1.98 m) | 220 lb (100 kg) | RS Sr | Palo Verde HS; DePaul | Las Vegas, NV |
| G | 5 | Corey Walker | 6 ft 5 in (1.96 m) | 190 lb (86 kg) | RS Sr | Santa Monica HS; Riverside City College; Hampton | Santa Monica, CA |
| G | 10 | Lanerryl Johnson | 6 ft 1 in (1.85 m) | 165 lb (75 kg) | RS Jr | Walton HS; Central Arizona College | Atlanta, GA |
| G | 11 | Josh Gentry | 6 ft 4 in (1.93 m) | 180 lb (82 kg) | Jr | Pike HS; North Dakota; Trinity Valley CC | Indianapolis, IN |
| G | 12 | Malcolm Brooks | 6 ft 5 in (1.96 m) | 185 lb (84 kg) | Sr | Benjamin Cardozo HS; Pepperdine | Brooklyn, NY |
| F | 13 | Joe Boyd | 6 ft 9 in (2.06 m) | 240 lb (109 kg) | So | Chaparral HS | Scottsdale, AZ |
| F | 15 | Jamar Akoh | 6 ft 7 in (2.01 m) | 240 lb (109 kg) | Fr | Los Osos HS | Rancho Cucamonga, CA |
| F | 21 | Steve McClellan | 6 ft 7 in (2.01 m) | 250 lb (113 kg) | RS Sr | Edison HS; Louisiana–Monroe | Fresno, CA |
| G | 22 | Sheldon Blackwell | 6 ft 5 in (1.96 m) | 175 lb (79 kg) | So | Etiwanda HS | Rancho Cucamonga, CA |
| G | 23 | Alex Harris | 6 ft 1 in (1.85 m) | 180 lb (82 kg) | RS Sr | El Cerrito HS; Northeastern | Richmond, CA |
| G | 24 | Keilan Horton | 6 ft 0 in (1.83 m) | 180 lb (82 kg) | Jr | Culver City HS; Santa Monica College | Los Angeles, CA |
| C | 33 | Kennedy Esume | 6 ft 10 in (2.08 m) | 245 lb (111 kg) | Jr | Luminary School; College of Southern Idaho | Umuaja, Nigeria |
| F | 34 | Temjae Singleton | 6 ft 7 in (2.01 m) | 205 lb (93 kg) | RS Jr | El Camino HS; Arizona Western College | Los Angeles, CA |
| F | 42 | Malcolm Henderson | 6 ft 8 in (2.03 m) | 250 lb (113 kg) | RS So | Vanier College; Missouri State West Plains | Montreal, QE |

Head coach

- Dedrique Taylor (UC Davis)

Assistant coach(es)

- John Smith (Dominican (CA))
- Danny Sprinkle (Montana State)
- Robert Spence (Guilford

Legend

- (C) Team captain
- (S) Suspended
- (I) Ineligible
- (W) Walk-on
- Injured
- Current redshirt

Roster

== Schedule and results ==
| Date time, TV | Opponent | Result | Record | Site (attendance) city, state |
Exhibition
| 11/08/2014*; 6:00 pm | Caltech | W 84–53 | | Titan Gym; Fullerton, CA |
Non-conference games
| 11/14/2014*; 7:00 pm | at Santa Clara | L 72–89 | 0–1 | Leavey Center (1,226); Santa Clara, CA |
| 11/16/2014*; 6:00 pm, RTRM | at New Mexico | L 59–67 | 0–2 | The Pit (13,829); Albuquerque, NM |
| 11/22/2014*; 2:00 pm | San Jose State | L 66–70 | 1–2 | Titan Gym (1,092); Fullerton, CA |
| 11/25/2014*; 8:00 pm, P12N | at USC | L 49–53 | 1–3 | Galen Center (2,297); Los Angeles, CA |
| 11/27/2014*; 3:30 pm, ESPN3 | vs. Wright State; USC Upstate Tournament | W 67–62 | 2–3 | G. B. Hodge Center (255); Spartanburg, SC |
| 11/28/2014*; 3:00 pm, ESPN3 | at USC Upstate; USC Upstate Tournament | L 64–79 | 2–4 | G. B. Hodge Center (618); Spartanburg, SC |
| 11/29/2014*; 12:30 pm, ESPN3 | vs. FIU; USC Upstate Tournament | W 64–61 | 3–4 | G. B. Hodge Center (314); Spartanburg, SC |
| 12/03/2014*; 9:00 pm, P12N | at UCLA | L 45–73 | 3–5 | Pauley Pavilion (4,897); Los Angeles, CA |
| 12/06/2014*; 6:00 pm | Pepperdine | L 62–74 | 3–6 | Titan Gym (1,314); Fullerton, CA |
| 12/11/2014*; 7:05 pm | at Sacramento State | L 59–73 | 3–7 | Colberg Court (436); Sacramento, CA |
| 12/13/2014*; 7:00 pm | at Nevada | W 65–55 | 4–7 | Lawlor Events Center (4,858); Reno, NV |
| 12/18/2014*; 7:00 pm | Cal State Dominguez Hills | W 72–50 | 5–7 | Titan Gym (557); Fullerton, CA |
| 12/22/2014*; 7:00 pm | Texas A&M–Corpus Christi | W 82–77 | 6–7 | Titan Gym (578); Fullerton, CA |
| 12/30/2014*; 7:00 pm | Cal State East Bay | W 77–45 | 7–7 | Titan Gym (602); Fullerton, CA |
| 01/03/2015*; 6:00 pm | Seattle | W 67–55 | 8–7 | Titan Gym (738); Fullerton, CA |
Conference games
| 01/08/2015; 7:00 pm | at UC Riverside | L 78–84 ^{OT} | 8–8 (0–1) | UC Riverside Student Recreation Center (712); Riverside, CA |
| 01/15/2015; 7:30 pm, Prime Ticket | UC Irvine | L 58–63 | 8–9 (0–2) | Titan Gym (995); Fullerton, CA |
| 01/17/2015; 6:00 pm | UC Davis | L 68–79 | 8–10 (0–3) | Titan Gym (789); Fullerton, CA |
| 01/22/2015; 7:00 pm | at Cal Poly | L 55–66 | 8–11 (0–4) | Mott Gym (1,964); San Luis Obispo, CA |
| 01/24/2015; 4:00 pm | at UC Santa Barbara | L 49–68 | 8–12 (0–5) | The Thunderdome (2,216); Santa Barbara, CA |
| 01/29/2015; 7:30 pm, Prime Ticket | Long Beach State | L 85–91 ^{OT} | 8–13 (0–6) | Titan Gym (2,090); Fullerton, CA |
| 02/05/2015; 7:00 pm | Cal State Northridge | W 69–53 | 9–13 (1–6) | Titan Gym (882); Fullerton, CA |
| 02/07/2015; 6:00 pm | UC Riverside | L 66–71 ^{OT} | 9–14 (1–7) | Titan Gym (3,102); Fullerton, CA |
| 02/12/2015; 7:00 pm | at UC Davis | L 69–75 | 9–15 (1–8) | The Pavilion (1,528); Davis, CA |
| 02/14/2015; 11:00 pm | at Hawaii | L 61–81 | 9–16 (1–9) | Stan Sheriff Center (7,475); Honolulu, HI |
| 02/19/2015; 7:00 pm | Cal Poly | L 54–65 | 9–17 (1–10) | Titan Gym (960); Fullerton, CA |
| 02/21/2015; 5:00 pm, ESPN3 | UC Santa Barbara | L 54–69 | 9–18 (1–11) | Titan Gym (1,089); Fullerton, CA |
| 02/26/2015; 7:00 pm | at Cal State Northridge | L 72–82 | 9–19 (1–12) | Matadome (1,017); Northridge, CA |
| 02/28/2015; 4:00 pm | at Long Beach State | L 47–70 | 9–20 (1–13) | Walter Pyramid (4,357); Long Beach, CA |
| 03/05/2015; 7:00 pm | at UC Irvine | L 62–68 | 9–21 (1–14) | Bren Events Center (2,853); Irvine, CA |
| 03/07/2015; 5:00 pm, ESPN3 | Hawaii | L 70–91 | 9–22 (1–15) | Titan Gym (860); Fullerton, CA |
*Non-conference game. ^{#}Rankings from AP Poll. (#) Tournament seedings in parentheses. All times are in Pacific Time.
