= 2014–15 UC Davis Aggies men's basketball team =

American college basketball season

2014–15 UC Davis Aggies men's basketball
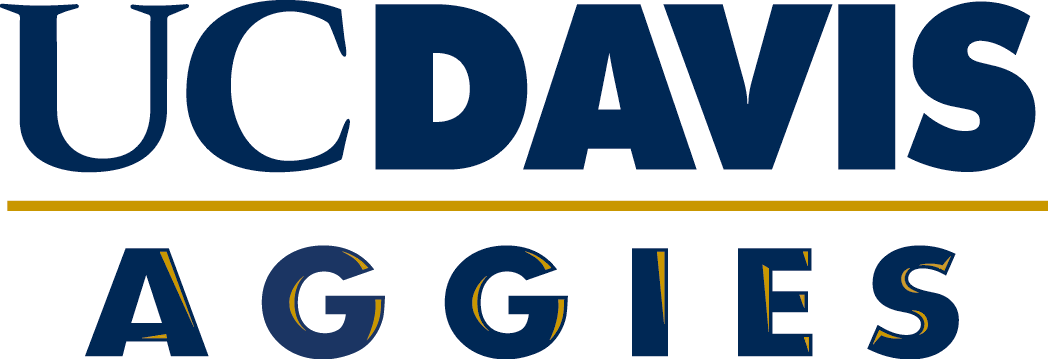

Big West regular season champions

NIT, First round
- Conference: Big West Conference
- Record: 25–7 (14–2 Big West)
- Head coach: Jim Les (4th season)
- Assistant coaches: Kevin Nosek; Chris Davis; Kyle Vogt
- Home arena: The Pavilion

2014–15 Big West men's basketball standings
	Conf.				Overall
Team	W		L	PCT	W		L	PCT
UC Davis	14	–	2	.875	25	–	7	.781
UC Irvine †	11	–	5	.688	21	–	13	.618
UC Santa Barbara	11	–	5	.688	19	–	14	.576
Long Beach State	10	–	6	.625	16	–	17	.485
Hawai'i	8	–	8	.500	22	–	13	.629
UC Riverside	7	–	9	.438	14	–	17	.452
Cal Poly	6	–	10	.375	13	–	16	.448
Cal State Northridge	4	–	12	.250	9	–	24	.273
Cal State Fullerton	1	–	15	.063	9	–	22	.290
† 2015 Big West tournament winner

The 2014–15 UC Davis Aggies men's basketball team represented the University of California, Davis during the 2014–15 NCAA Division I men's basketball season. The Aggies, led by fourth year head coach Jim Les, played their home games at The Pavilion as members of the Big West Conference. They finished the season 25–7, 14–2 in Big West play to win the Big West regular season championship. They advanced to the semifinals of the Big West tournament where they lost to Hawaii. As a regular season conference champion who failed to win their conference tournament, they received an automatic bid to the National Invitation Tournament where they lost in the first round to Stanford.

== Roster ==
2014–15 UC Davis Aggies men's basketball team
Players
Coaches

Pos.	#	Name	Height	Weight	Year	Previous school	Hometown
G	0	Brynton Lemar	6 ft 4 in (1.93 m)	195 lb (88 kg)	So	St. Augustine HS	San Diego, California
G	2	Darius Graham	5 ft 10 in (1.78 m)	180 lb (82 kg)	RS So	Sacramento HS	Sacramento, California
G	3	Corey Hawkins	6 ft 3 in (1.91 m)	195 lb (88 kg)	Sr	Estrella HS; Arizona State	Goodyear, Arizona
G	10	Isaiah Walton	6 ft 4 in (1.93 m)	174 lb (79 kg)	Fr	Elyria HS	Oberlin, Ohio
F	12	Georgia Funtarov	6 ft 8 in (2.03 m)	210 lb (95 kg)	So	Vermont Academy	Sofia, Bulgaria
F	13	J. T. Adenrele	6 ft 7 in (2.01 m)	235 lb (107 kg)	RS Jr	Oakmont HS	Roseville, California
G	15	Tyler Les	6 ft 2 in (1.88 m)	185 lb (84 kg)	RS Sr	Notre Dame HS	Peoria, Illinois
G	20	Avery Johnson	6 ft 3 in (1.91 m)	180 lb (82 kg)	Sr	Ocean View HS; San Francisco	Long Beach, California
F	21	Josh Fox	6 ft 6 in (1.98 m)	210 lb (95 kg)	Jr	Sacred Heart Cathedral Prep; City College of San Francisco	Daly City, California
C	22	Neal Monson	6 ft 10 in (2.08 m)	230 lb (104 kg)	So	Waterford School; Salt Lake CC	Sandy, Utah
F	23	Josh Ritchart	6 ft 9 in (2.06 m)	235 lb (107 kg)	RS Sr	Forest Lake Christian HS	Auburn, California
F/C	24	Nolan Berry (redshirt)	6 ft 10 in (2.08 m)	235 lb (107 kg)	So	De Smet HS; Butler	St. Louis, Missouri
G	31	Michael Onyebalu	6 ft 3 in (1.91 m)	190 lb (86 kg)	Fr	Warren HS	Inglewood, California
F	40	Justin Dueck	6 ft 9 in (2.06 m)	235 lb (107 kg)	Jr	Leland HS	San Jose, California

Head coach

- Jim Les (Bradley)

Assistant coach(es)

- Kevin Nosek (UC Davis)
- Chris Davis (Michigan)
- Kyle Vogt (Lakeland)

Legend

- (C) Team captain
- (S) Suspended
- (I) Ineligible
- (W) Walk-on
- Injured
- Current redshirt

Roster

== Schedule ==
Date time, TV	Rank^{#}	Opponent^{#}	Result	Record	Site (attendance) city, state
Non-Conference Games
11/16/2014*; 4:00 pm		Holy Names	W 57–42	1–0	The Pavilion (779); Davis, California
11/20/2014*; 5:00 pm		at Eastern Illinois	W 63–61	2–0	Lantz Arena (1,044); Charleston, Illinois
11/22/2014*; 4:00 pm		at Furman	W 58–55	3–0	Timmons Arena (913); Greenville, South Carolina
11/26/2014*; 7:00 pm		Utah State	W 77–70 ^{OT}	4–0	The Pavilion (1,877); Davis, California
11/29/2014*; 7:00 pm		Utah Valley	W 64–43	5–0	The Pavilion (1,240); Davis, California
12/03/2014*; 7:00 pm		San Jose State	W 70–56	6–0	The Pavilion (1,965); Davis, California
12/03/2014*; 2:00 pm		at Idaho	L 71–79	6–1	Cowan Spectrum (1,430); Moscow, Idaho
12/09/2014*; 7:00 pm		Eastern Illinois	W 80–70	7–1	The Pavilion (1,275); Davis, California
12/20/2014*; 6:00 pm		at Air Force	W 81–75	8–1	Clune Arena (1,585); Colorado Springs, Colorado
12/22/2014*; 6:00 pm		at Northern Colorado	W 73–63	9–1	Bank of Colorado Arena (710); Greeley, Colorado
12/28/2014*; 7:00 pm, P12N		at Washington State	L 83–90	9–2	Beasley Coliseum (1,401); Pullman, Washington
12/30/2014*; 7:00 pm		at Seattle	L 67–76	9–3	KeyArena (1,635); Seattle, Washington
01/03/2015*; 7:00 pm		Cal Maritime	W 78–41	10–3	The Pavilion (1,578); Davis, California
Conference Games
01/07/2015; 7:00 pm		Cal State Northridge	W 71–61	11–3 (1–0)	The Pavilion (1,935); Davis, California
01/10/2015; 8:00 pm, ESPNU		Long Beach State	W 73–67 ^{OT}	12–3 (2–0)	The Pavilion (5,089); Davis, California
01/15/2015; 7:00 pm		at UC Riverside	W 74–61	13–3 (3–0)	UC Riverside Student Recreation Center (923); Riverside, California
01/17/2015; 6:00 pm		at Cal State Fullerton	W 79–68	14–3 (4–0)	Titan Gym (789); Fullerton, California
01/22/2015; 9:00 pm		at Hawaii	L 76–84	14–4 (4–1)	Stan Sheriff Center (5,739); Honolulu, Hawaii
01/29/2015; 7:00 pm		UC Santa Barbara	W 70–64	15–4 (5–1)	The Pavilion (3,081); Davis, California
01/31/2015; 7:00 pm, ESPNU		Cal Poly	W 81–78 ^{OT}	16–4 (6–1)	The Pavilion (5,317); Davis, California
02/05/2015; 7:00 pm, ESPN3		at UC Irvine	W 75–56	17–4 (7–1)	Bren Events Center (2,094); Irvine, California
02/07/2015; 7:00 pm, Prime Ticket		at Cal State Northridge	W 68–55	18–4 (8–1)	Matadome (1,025); Northridge, California
02/12/2015; 7:00 pm		Cal State Fullerton	W 75–69	19–4 (9–1)	The Pavilion (1,528); Davis, California
02/19/2015; 7:00 pm, ESPN3		at Long Beach State	W 65–58	20–4 (10–1)	Walter Pyramid (3,426); Long Beach, California
02/21/2015; 7:00 pm		Hawaii	W 74–67	21–4 (11–1)	The Pavilion (3,657); Davis, California
02/26/2015; 7:00 pm		at UC Santa Barbara	L 60–74	21–5 (11–2)	The Thunderdome (2,823); Santa Barbara, California
02/28/2015; 7:00 pm		at Cal Poly	W 66–56	22–5 (12–2)	Mott Gym (3,032); San Luis Obispo, California
03/05/2015; 7:00 pm		UC Riverside	W 61–59	23–5 (13–2)	The Pavilion (2,511); Davis, California
03/07/2015; 7:00 pm		UC Irvine	W 80–61	24–5 (14–2)	The Pavilion (4,345); Davis, California
Big West tournament
03/12/2015; 12:00 pm, Prime Ticket		vs. Cal State Northridge; Quarterfinals	W 71–67	25–5	Honda Center (N/A); Anaheim, California
03/13/2015; 6:30 pm, ESPN3/ESPNU (Delayed on U)		vs. Hawaii; Semifinals	L 58–65	25–6	Honda Center (4,322); Anaheim, California
NIT
03/17/2014*; 8:00 pm, ESPN2	No. (7)	at (2) Stanford; First round	L 64–77	25–7	Maples Pavilion (1,436); Palo Alto, California
*Non-conference game. ^{#}Rankings from AP Poll. (#) Tournament seedings in parentheses. All times are in Pacific Time. (#) during NIT is seed within region.
