= 2014–15 UC Irvine Anteaters men's basketball team =

American college basketball season

2014–15 UC Irvine Anteaters men's basketball

South Point Holiday Hoops Classic champions Big West tournament champions

NCAA tournament, round of 64
- Conference: Big West Conference
- Record: 21–13 (11–5 Big West)
- Head coach: Russell Turner (5th season)
- Assistant coaches: Ali Ton; Ryan Badrtalei; Nick Booker
- Home arena: Bren Events Center

2014–15 Big West men's basketball standings
	Conf.				Overall
Team	W		L	PCT	W		L	PCT
UC Davis	14	–	2	.875	25	–	7	.781
UC Irvine †	11	–	5	.688	21	–	13	.618
UC Santa Barbara	11	–	5	.688	19	–	14	.576
Long Beach State	10	–	6	.625	16	–	17	.485
Hawai'i	8	–	8	.500	22	–	13	.629
UC Riverside	7	–	9	.438	14	–	17	.452
Cal Poly	6	–	10	.375	13	–	16	.448
Cal State Northridge	4	–	12	.250	9	–	24	.273
Cal State Fullerton	1	–	15	.063	9	–	22	.290
† 2015 Big West tournament winner

The 2014–15 UC Irvine Anteaters men's basketball team represented the University of California, Irvine during the 2014–15 NCAA Division I men's basketball season. The Anteaters were led by fifth-year head coach Russell Turner and played their home games at the Bren Events Center in Irvine, California. They were members of the Big West Conference and finished the season 21–13, 11–5 in Big West play, to finish in a tie for second place. They defeated UC Riverside, UC Santa Barbara and Hawaii to become champions of the Big West tournament. They received an automatic bid to the NCAA tournament, their first tournament bid in school history, where they lost in the second round to Louisville.

== Off-season ==
=== 2014 recruiting class ===
College recruiting information
Name	Hometown	School	Height	Weight	Commit date
Jonathan Galloway; C	Richmond, CA	Salesian High School	6 ft 9 in (2.06 m)	215 lb (98 kg)	Oct 27, 2013
Jonathan Galloway; C	Recruit ratings: ESPN: (66)				
Overall recruit ranking: Scout: n/a Rivals: n/a ESPN: n/a
Note: In many cases, Scout, Rivals, 247Sports, On3, and ESPN may conflict in their listings of height and weight.; In these cases, the average was taken. ESPN grades are on a 100-point scale.; Sources: "ESPN - UC Irvine Basketball Recruiting 2014". ESPN.; "2014 Team Ranking". Rivals.

== Roster ==
2014–15 UC Irvine Anteaters men's basketball team
Players
Coaches

Pos.	#	Name	Height	Weight	Year	Hometown
C	33	Mike Best	6 ft 10 in (2.08 m)	205 lb (93 kg)	Jr	San Rafael, CA
F	3	Will II Davis	6 ft 8 in (2.03 m)	210 lb (95 kg)	Sr	Sacramento, CA
F/C	12	Ioannis Dimakopoulos	7 ft 2 in (2.18 m)	255 lb (116 kg)	So	Patras, Greece
G	24	Dominique Dunning	6 ft 3 in (1.91 m)	213 lb (97 kg)	Jr	Corona, CA
F	5	Jonathan Galloway	6 ft 10 in (2.08 m)	215 lb (98 kg)	Fr	Brentwood, CA
G	0	Jaron Martin	5 ft 10 in (1.78 m)	160 lb (73 kg)	So	Sunland, CA
F	4	Reed McConnell	6 ft 5 in (1.96 m)	190 lb (86 kg)	Jr	Atherton, CA
C	34	Mamadou N'Diaye	7 ft 6 in (2.29 m)	290 lb (132 kg)	So	Dakar, Senegal
G	10	Luke Nelson	6 ft 3 in (1.91 m)	182 lb (83 kg)	So	Worthing, England
F	20	Shawn Ray	6 ft 8 in (2.03 m)	232 lb (105 kg)	RS Jr	Torrance, CA
G	31	Spencer Rivers	6 ft 2 in (1.88 m)	190 lb (86 kg)	Fr	Winter Park, FL
C	25	John Ryan	6 ft 10 in (2.08 m)	247 lb (112 kg)	Sr	El Segundo, CA
G	11	Haroldas Saprykinas	6 ft 3 in (1.91 m)	170 lb (77 kg)	Fr	Klaipėda, Lithuania
F	2	Travis Souza	6 ft 4 in (1.93 m)	222 lb (101 kg)	Sr	Turlock, CA
G	32	Aaron Wright	6 ft 3 in (1.91 m)	188 lb (85 kg)	Jr	Cerritos, CA
G	1	Alex Young	6 ft 1 in (1.85 m)	176 lb (80 kg)	Jr	Phoenix, OR

Head coach

- Russell Turner (Hampden–Sydney)

Assistant coach(es)

- Ali Ton (Davidson)
- Ryan Badtalei (UCLA)
- Nick Booker (Davidson)

Legend

- (C) Team captain
- (S) Suspended
- (I) Ineligible
- (W) Walk-on
- Injured
- Current redshirt

Roster
Last update: October 7, 2024

== Schedule ==
Date time, TV	Rank^{#}	Opponent^{#}	Result	Record	Site (attendance) city, state
Exhibition
November 8, 2014*; 7:00 p.m.		Simon Fraser	W 128–92		Bren Events Center (1,844); Irvine, CA
Non-conference regular season
November 14, 2014*; 7:00 p.m.		Chapman	W 87–36	1–0	Bren Events Center (2,854); Irvine, CA
November 16, 2014*; 3:00 p.m.		Pacific	W 68–50	2–0	Bren Events Center (1,783); Irvine, CA
November 19, 2014*; 6:00 p.m., P12N		at No. 2 Arizona	L 54–71	2–1	McKale Center (14,655); Tucson, AZ
November 23, 2014*; 6:00 p.m., CSN Hometown TheW.tv		at Saint Mary's	L 69–72	2–2	McKeon Pavilion (2,685); Moraga, CA
November 29, 2014*; 8:00 p.m., TheW.tv		at Loyola Marymount	W 80–72	3–2	Gersten Pavilion (1,568); Los Angeles, CA
December 3, 2014*; 7:00 p.m.		at Fresno State	L 63–72	3–3	Save Mart Center (5,210); Fresno, CA
December 6, 2014*; 7:00 p.m.		Sacramento State	W 74–62	4–3	Bren Events Center (2,259); Irvine, CA
December 13, 2014*; 7:00 p.m.		UT Arlington	L 62–70	4–4	Bren Events Center (2,067); Irvine, CA
December 16, 2014*; 4:00 p.m.		at Morgan State	L 62–63	4–5	Talmadge L. Hill Field House (895); Baltimore, MD
December 21, 2014*; 1:30 p.m.		vs. Bradley; South Point Holiday Hoops Classic semifinals	W 55–47	5–5	South Point Arena (N/A); Enterprise, NV
December 22, 2014*; 1:30 p.m.		vs. Green Bay; South Point Holiday Hoops Classic championship game	W 72–70	6–5	South Point Arena (N/A); Enterprise, NV
December 29, 2014*; 8:00 p.m., P12N		at Oregon	L 67–69 ^{OT}	6–6	Matthew Knight Arena (5,421); Eugene, OR
December 31, 2014*; 2:00 p.m.		Hampden–Sydney	W 82–53	7–6	Bren Events Center (1,366); Irvine, CA
January 3, 2015*; 6:00 p.m., Aggievision/FCS Pacific		at New Mexico State	L 67–70	7–7	Pan American Center (4,903); Las Cruces, NM
Big West regular season
January 8, 2015; 7:30 p.m., Prime Ticket		Long Beach State	L 82–88	7–8 (0–1)	Bren Events Center (2,963); Irvine, CA
January 10, 2015; 7:00 p.m., ESPN3		UC Riverside	W 69–55	8–8 (1–1)	Bren Events Center (2,047); Irvine, CA
January 15, 2015; 7:30 p.m., Prime Ticket		at Cal State Fullerton	W 63–58	9–8 (2–1)	Titan Gym (995); Fullerton, CA
January 22, 2015; 7:00 p.m., ESPN3		at Cal State Northridge	W 80–49	10–8 (3–1)	Matadome (1,311); Northridge, CA
January 24, 2015; 9:00 p.m., OC Sports		at Hawaii	W 78–72	11–8 (4–1)	Stan Sheriff Center (8,761); Honolulu, HI
January 29, 2014; 7:00 p.m., ESPN3		Cal Poly	W 67–57	12–8 (5–1)	Bren Events Center (1,588); Irvine, CA
January 31, 2015; 7:00 p.m.		UC Santa Barbara; Homecoming	W 77–55	13–8 (6–1)	Bren Events Center (3,773); Irvine, CA
February 5, 2015; 7:00 p.m., ESPN3		UC Davis	L 56–75	13–9 (6–2)	Bren Events Center (2,094); Irvine, CA
February 7, 2015; 4:00 p.m., ESPN3		at Long Beach State	W 56–55	14–9 (7–2)	Walter Pyramid (3,834); Long Beach, CA
February 14, 2015; 7:00 p.m., ESPN3		at UC Riverside	L 63–70	14–10 (7–3)	The SRC (592); Riverside, CA
February 19, 2015; 7:30 p.m., Prime Ticket		Hawaii	W 75-60	15–10 (8–3)	Bren Events Center (1,810); Irvine, CA
February 21, 2015; 7:00 p.m.		Cal State Northridge	W 67–58	16–10 (9–3)	Bren Events Center (3,070); Irvine, CA
February 26, 2015; 7:00 p.m.		at Cal Poly	W 63–56	17–10 (10–3)	Mott Gym (2,163); San Luis Obispo, CA
February 28, 2015; 9:00 p.m., ESPN2		at UC Santa Barbara	L 51–54	17–11 (10–4)	The Thunderdome (4,716); Santa Barbara, CA
March 5, 2015; 7:00 p.m.		Cal State Fullerton	W 68-62	18–11 (11–4)	Bren Events Center (2,853); Irvine, CA
March 7, 2015; 7:00 p.m.		at UC Davis	L 61–80	18–12 (11–5)	The Pavilion (4,345); Davis, CA
Big West tournament
March 12, 2015; 6:00 p.m., Prime Ticket	(3)	vs. (6) UC Riverside; Quarterfinals	W 63–54	19–12	Honda Center (3,867); Anaheim, CA
March 13, 2015; 9:00 p.m., ESPNU	(3)	vs. (2) UC Santa Barbara; Semifinals	W 72–63 ^{OT}	20–12	Honda Center (4,322); Anaheim, CA
March 14, 2015; 8:30 p.m., ESPN2	(3)	vs. (5) Hawaii; Championship game	W 67–58	21–12	Honda Center (5,463); Anaheim, CA
NCAA Tournament
March 20, 2015*; 1:10 p.m., TBS	(13 E)	vs. (4 E) No. 17 Louisville; Second round	L 55–57	21–13	KeyArena (14,509); Seattle, WA
*Non-conference game. ^{#}Rankings from AP poll. (#) Tournament seedings in parentheses. All times are in Pacific.
