= Pierre Olivaint =

French Jesuit killed by the Paris Commune

Pierre Olivaint (1816–1871) was a French Jesuit who was killed by the Paris Commune.

== Early life ==
Pierre Olivaint was born in 1816 of parents who were not religious.

At twenty, he left home, and the College of Charlemagne, where he had studied, imbued him with the doctrines of Voltaire. He wrote at the time, "I desire, if by any possibility I should become a priest, to be a missionary, and if I am a missionary to be a martyr". In 1836, he entered the École Normale. Led at first by Philippe Buchez's neo-Catholicism and then won by the sermons of Lacordaire, he made his profession of faith to Gustave Delacroix de Ravignan (1837). At the École Normale, he formed a Catholic group.

The Conferences of St. Vincent de Paul attracted the élite of the schools, and Olivaint with twelve of his companions established them in the parish of Saint Ménard. In 1836, Olivaint heard that Lacordaire was going to restore the Dominican Order in France. Several of his friends had already decided to follow Lacordaire, but Olivant had the duty of supporting his mother.

== Career ==
After a year of professorship at Grenoble, he returned to Paris, and occupied the chair of history at Bourbon College; in 1841 he accepted a position as tutor to the young George de la Rochefoucaud.

In 1842 Olivaint won the junior fellowship in a history competition. His lecture was on Pope Gregory VII, and Saint-Marc Girardin closed the assembly with these words: "We have just heard virtue, pleading the cause of virtue". At the time, war was declared against the Jesuits. Quinet and Michelet changed their lectures into impassioned attacks against the society. On 2 May 1845, Adolphe Thiers was to conduct before the assembly an interpellation against the religious order. Olivaint saw that it was his duty to be present. "I hesitated", he said to Louis Veuillot, "I hesitate no longer. M. Thiers shows me my duty. I must follow it. I enter to-day". The day of the proposed interpellation, he entered the novitiate of Laval.

After a year's novitiate, he was made professor of history at the College of Brugelette, in Belgium. On 3 May 1847, he made his first vows, and on the completion of theological studies he received holy orders.

Meanwhile, the law of 1850 had established in France the right of controlling education. Olivaint was summoned to Paris, where he remained. On 3 May 1852, Pierre arrived at the College of Vaugirard of which the Jesuits had accepted the charge. He was to spend thirteen years there, first as professor and prefect of studies and then as rector. Among his works were L'oeuvre de L'Enfant Jésus pour la prèmiere communion des juenes filles pauvres and L'oeuvre de Saint François-Xavier for the workmen of the parish of Vaugirard.

After twenty-five years devoted to teaching, Olivaint was named Superior of the House in Paris (1865). In the meantime, a spirit of revolt agitated Paris and spread throughout France. In January 1870, Olivaint wrote, "Persecution is upon us; it will be terrible; we will pass through torrents of blood".

== Death ==
On 4 April 1871, the fédérés arrested Georges Darboy and several others. The next day, they took possession of the house on Rue de Sèvres, and Olivaint quietly gave himself up. On 24 May, Darboy and five other prisoners were executed; on the twenty-sixth, fifty-two victims, with Olivaint marching at their head, were dragged through Paris and massacred in the Rue Haxo. The next day, the Paris Commune was overthrown.

The remains of Olivaint and the four priests who fell with him (Ducoudray, Caubert, Clere, and de Bengy) were placed in a chapel on Rue de Sèvres.

== Veneration ==
The cause for Olivaint and his companions was formally opened on 17 February 1937, granting them the title of Servants of God. Their spiritual writings were approved by theologians on 20 November 1940 and 16 March 1946.

== See also ==
- Conférence Olivaint
