= 2014–15 Cal Poly Mustangs men's basketball team =

American college basketball season

2014–15 Cal Poly Mustangs men's basketball
- Conference: BIG West Conference
- Record: 13–16 (6–10 BIG West)
- Head coach: Joe Callero (6th season)
- Assistant coaches: Paul Fortier; Sam Kirby; Mitch Reaves
- Home arena: Mott Gym

2014–15 Big West men's basketball standings
	Conf.				Overall
Team	W		L	PCT	W		L	PCT
UC Davis	14	–	2	.875	25	–	7	.781
UC Irvine †	11	–	5	.688	21	–	13	.618
UC Santa Barbara	11	–	5	.688	19	–	14	.576
Long Beach State	10	–	6	.625	16	–	17	.485
Hawai'i	8	–	8	.500	22	–	13	.629
UC Riverside	7	–	9	.438	14	–	17	.452
Cal Poly	6	–	10	.375	13	–	16	.448
Cal State Northridge	4	–	12	.250	9	–	24	.273
Cal State Fullerton	1	–	15	.063	9	–	22	.290
† 2015 Big West tournament winner

The 2014–15 Cal Poly Mustangs men's basketball team represented California Polytechnic State University during the 2014–15 NCAA Division I men's basketball season. The Mustangs were led by sixth year head coach Joe Callero and played their home games at Mott Gym. They finished the season 13–16, 6–10 in Big West play to finish in seventh place. They lost in the quarterfinals of the Big West tournament to UC Santa Barbara.

== Roster ==
Number	Name	Position	Height	Weight	Year	Hometown
0	David Nwaba	Guard	6–4	200	Junior	Los Angeles, California
1	Aleks Abrams	Forward	6–8	225	Freshman	Westlake Village, California
2	Trevor John	Guard	6–3	182	Freshman	Danville, California
3	Maliik Love	Guard	6–2	209	Senior	Oceanside, California
4	Alberto Ganis	Forward	6–5	211	Senior	Tavagnacco, Italy
5	Reese Morgan	Guard	6–2	206	Junior	San Pedro, California
10	Ridge Shipley	Guard	6–0	184	Sophomore	Carrollton, Texas
11	Taylor Sutlive	Guard	6–3	193	Sophomore	San Antonio, Texas
13	Kyle Toth	Guard	6–2	175	Junior	Sunnyvale, California
14	Max Betkowski	Guard	6–3	224	Sophomore	San Francisco, California
21	Luke Meikle	Forward	6–9	203	Sophomore	Tacoma, Washington
25	Joel Awich	Forward	6–7	209	Junior	St. Paul, Minnesota
30	Michael Bolden	Guard	6–5	192	Senior	Mission Viejo, California
34	Brian Bennett	Forward	6–9	253	Junior	Romeoville, Illinois
42	Anthony Silvestri	Forward	6–7	218	Senior	San Francisco, California
44	Zach Gordon	Forward	6–8	229	Junior	Lynnwood, Washington

== Schedule ==
Date time, TV	Opponent	Result	Record	Site (attendance) city, state
Non-conference games
11/15/2014*; 3:00 pm	at Nevada	L 49–65	0–1	Lawlor Events Center (5,060); Reno, NV
11/18/2014*; 7:00 pm	San Francisco State	W 65–44	1–1	Mott Gym (1,901); San Luis Obispo, CA
11/21/2014*; 7:00 pm	Delaware	W 78–60	2–1	Mott Gym (2,416); San Luis Obispo, CA
11/26/2014*; 7:00 pm, P12N	at California	L 52–72	2–2	Haas Pavilion (5,712); Berkeley, CA
11/29/2014*; 7:00 pm, CSN Hometown	at Saint Mary's	L 56–82	2–3	McKeon Pavilion (2,703); Moraga, CA
12/06/2014*; 7:00 pm	Menlo	W 72–35	3–3	Mott Gym (1,707); San Luis Obispo, CA
12/13/2014*; 7:00 pm	at Fresno State	L 57–63	3–4	Save Mart Center (5,372); Fresno, CA
12/15/2014*; 7:00 pm	at San Francisco	W 78–71	4–4	War Memorial Gymnasium (1,396); San Francisco, CA
12/17/2014*; 7:00 pm	vs. Northeastern; Cable Car Classic	W 60–58	5–4	Leavey Center (965); Santa Clara, CA
12/20/2014*; 7:00 pm, RTNW	vs. No. 8 Gonzaga; Battle in Seattle	L 50–63	5–5	KeyArena (11,741); Seattle, WA
12/23/2014*; 2:00 pm	at Santa Clara; Cable Car Classic	W 69–58	6–5	Leavey Center (1,107); Santa Clara, CA
12/30/2014*; 6:00 pm	at IPFW	W 71–57	7–5	Hilliard Gates Sports Center (1,235); Fort Wayne, IN
Conference games
01/07/2015; 9:00 pm	at Hawaiʻi	W 61–57 ^{OT}	8–5 (1–0)	Stan Sheriff Center (6,219); Honolulu, HI
01/10/2015; 7:00 pm	UC Santa Barbara	L 45–50	8–6 (1–1)	Mott Gym (3,032); San Luis Obispo, CA
01/15/2015; 7:00 pm, ESPN3	at Long Beach	L 48–50	8–7 (1–2)	Walter Pyramid (2,425); Long Beach, CA
01/17/2015; 7:00 pm	at Cal State Northridge	L 48–55	8–8 (1–3)	Matadome (1,084); Northridge, CA
01/22/2015; 7:00 pm	Cal State Fullerton	W 66–55	9–8 (2–3)	Mott Gym (1,964); San Luis Obispo, CA
01/24/2015; 7:00 pm	UC Riverside	W 68–49	10–8 (3–3)	Mott Gym (2,897); San Luis Obispo, CA
01/29/2015; 7:00 pm, ESPN3	at UC Irvine	L 57–67	10–9 (3–4)	Bren Events Center (1,588); Irvine, CA
01/31/2015; 7:00 pm, ESPNU	at UC Davis	L 78–81 ^{OT}	10–10 (3–5)	The Pavilion (5,317); Davis, CA
02/05/2015; 7:00 pm	Hawai'i	L 56–59	10–11 (3–6)	Mott Gym (2,876); San Luis Obispo, CA
02/12/2015; 7:00 pm	Cal State Northridge	W 70–63	11–11 (4–6)	Mott Gym (2,113); San Luis Obispo, CA
02/14/2015; 7:00 pm	Long Beach	W 71–58	12–11 (5–6)	Mott Gym (2,435); San Luis Obispo, CA
02/19/2015; 7:00 pm	at Cal State Fullerton	W 65–54	13–11 (6–6)	Titan Gym (960); Fullerton, CA
02/21/2015; 7:00 pm	at UC Riverside	L 44–48	13–12 (6–7)	UC Riverside Student Recreation Center (1,076); Riverside, CA
02/26/2015; 7:00 pm	UC Irvine	L 56–63	13–13 (6–8)	Mott Gym (2,163); San Luis Obispo, CA
02/28/2015; 7:00 pm	UC Davis	L 56–66	13–14 (6–9)	Mott Gym (3,032); San Luis Obispo, CA
03/07/2015; 3:00 pm, Prime Ticket	at UC Santa Barbara	L 56–64	13–15 (6–10)	The Thunderdome (5,414); Santa Barbara, CA
Big West tournament
03/12/2015; 11:30 pm	vs. UC Santa Barbara	L 50–54	13–16	Honda Center (3,867); Anaheim, CA
*Non-conference game. ^{#}Rankings from AP Poll. (#) Tournament seedings in parentheses. All times are in Pacific Time.
