= 2014–15 San Diego State Aztecs men's basketball team =

American college basketball season

2014–15 San Diego State Aztecs men's basketball

Mountain West regular season co–champions

NCAA tournament, round of 32
- Conference: Mountain West Conference
- Record: 27–9 (14–4 Mountain West)
- Head coach: Steve Fisher (16th season)
- Associate head coach: Brian Dutcher
- Assistant coaches: Justin Hutson; Dave Velasquez
- Home arena: Viejas Arena

2014–15 Mountain West Conference men's basketball standings
	Conf.				Overall
Team	W		L	PCT	W		L	PCT
Boise State	14	–	4	.778	25	–	9	.735
San Diego State	14	–	4	.778	27	–	9	.750
Colorado State	13	–	5	.722	27	–	7	.794
Wyoming †	11	–	7	.611	25	–	10	.714
Utah State	11	–	7	.611	18	–	13	.581
Fresno State	10	–	8	.556	15	–	17	.469
UNLV	8	–	10	.444	18	–	15	.545
New Mexico	7	–	11	.389	15	–	16	.484
Air Force	6	–	12	.333	14	–	17	.452
Nevada	5	–	13	.278	9	–	22	.290
San Jose State*	0	–	18	.000	2	–	28	.067
† 2015 MWC tournament winner *Ineligible for postseason play due to APR penalties

The 2014–15 San Diego State men's basketball team represented San Diego State University during the 2014–15 NCAA Division I men's basketball season. This was head coach Steve Fisher's sixteenth season at San Diego State. The Aztecs played their home games at Viejas Arena. They were members in the Mountain West Conference. They finished the season 27–9, 14–4 in Mountain West play to finish in a tie for the Mountain West regular season championship. They advanced to the championship game of the Mountain West tournament where they lost to Wyoming. They received an at-large bid to the NCAA tournament where they defeated St. John's in the second round before losing in the third round to Duke.

== Previous season ==
The 2013–14 San Diego State Aztecs finished the season with an overall record of 31–5, and 16–2 in the Mountain West to win regular season championship. In the MWC tournament, the Aztecs defeated Utah State and UNLV to make it to the championship game, where they lost to New Mexico, 64–58. The Aztecs received an at-large bid to the 2014 NCAA tournament as a 4-seed in the West Region. The team defeated 13-seed New Mexico State and 12-seed North Dakota State to make it to the Sweet Sixteen, where they eventually lost to 1-seed Arizona, 70–64.

== Off-season ==
=== Departures ===
Name	Number	Pos.	Height	Weight	Hometown	Year	Notes
Josh Davis	22	F	6’8”	215	Raleigh, North Carolina	Senior	Graduated.
James Johnson	12	C/F	6’10”	235	Wildomar, California	RS Junior	Elected to transfer.
Xavier Thames	2	G	6’3”	195	Sacramento, California	RS Senior	Graduated/2014 NBA draft.

=== 2014 Recruiting Class ===
College recruiting information
Name	Hometown	School	Height	Weight	Commit date
Kevin Zabo; PG	Wolfeboro, NH	Brewster Academy	6 ft 2 in (1.88 m)	175 lb (79 kg)	Oct 8, 2013
Kevin Zabo; PG	Recruit ratings: Scout: Rivals: 247Sports: (74)				
Trey Kell; SG	San Diego, CA	St. Augustine HS	6 ft 4 in (1.93 m)	200 lb (91 kg)	Jan 10, 2013
Trey Kell; SG	Recruit ratings: Scout: Rivals: 247Sports: (83)				
Malik Pope; SF	Sacramento, CA	Laguna Creek HS	6 ft 8 in (2.03 m)	210 lb (95 kg)	Sep 10, 2013
Malik Pope; SF	Recruit ratings: Scout: Rivals: 247Sports: (86)				
Zylan Cheatham; PF	Phoenix, AZ	South Mountain HS	6 ft 8 in (2.03 m)	210 lb (95 kg)	Oct 26, 2013
Zylan Cheatham; PF	Recruit ratings: Scout: Rivals: 247Sports: (82)				
Overall recruit ranking: Scout: #13 Rivals: #12 ESPN: #16
Note: In many cases, Scout, Rivals, 247Sports, On3, and ESPN may conflict in their listings of height and weight.; In these cases, the average was taken. ESPN grades are on a 100-point scale.; Sources: "2014 San Diego State Commits". ESPN.

== Roster ==
2014–15 San Diego State Aztecs men's basketball team
Players
Coaches

Pos.	#	Name	Height	Weight	Year	Previous school	Hometown
F	0	Skylar Spencer	6 ft 10 in (2.08 m)	240 lb (109 kg)	Jr	Frederick K.C. Price H.S.	Inglewood, California
G	2	Kevin Zabo	6 ft 2 in (1.88 m)	185 lb (84 kg)	Fr	Brewster Academy	Gatineau, Quebec
F	3	Angelo Chol	6 ft 9 in (2.06 m)	220 lb (100 kg)	RS Jr	Hoover H.S./Arizona	San Diego, California
G	4	Dakarai Allen	6 ft 5 in (1.96 m)	190 lb (86 kg)	So	Sheldon H.S.	Sacramento, California
F	5	Dwayne Polee II	6 ft 7 in (2.01 m)	200 lb (91 kg)	RS Sr	Westchester H.S./St. John's	Los Angeles, California
G	10	Aqeel Quinn	6 ft 3 in (1.91 m)	200 lb (91 kg)	RS Sr	Leuzinger H.S./CSUN	Gardena, California
G	11	D'Erryl Williams	6 ft 2 in (1.88 m)	195 lb (88 kg)	So	Sheldon H.S.	Sacramento, California
G	12	Trey Kell	6 ft 4 in (1.93 m)	215 lb (98 kg)	Fr	St. Augustine H.S.	San Diego, California
F	13	Winston Shepard	6 ft 8 in (2.03 m)	210 lb (95 kg)	Jr	Findlay Prep	Houston, Texas
F	14	Zylan Cheatham (redshirt)	6 ft 7 in (2.01 m)	210 lb (95 kg)	Fr	South Mountain H.S.	Phoenix, Arizona
F	20	J.J. O'Brien	6 ft 7 in (2.01 m)	215 lb (98 kg)	RS Sr	Alta Loma H.S./Utah	Rancho Cucamonga, California
F	21	Malik Pope	6 ft 10 in (2.08 m)	205 lb (93 kg)	Fr	Laguna Creek H.S	Sacramento, California
G	22	Parker U'u (W)	6 ft 4 in (1.93 m)	220 lb (100 kg)	RS So	Jesuit H.S./Hartford	Sacramento, California
G	23	Kibret Woldemichael (W)	5 ft 7 in (1.7 m)	150 lb (68 kg)	So	Mission Hills H.S.	San Marcos, California
G	24	Ryan Staten (W)	6 ft 2 in (1.88 m)	185 lb (84 kg)	Sr	Piedmont H.S.	San Pablo, California
F	33	Niksha Federico (W)	6 ft 6 in (1.98 m)	185 lb (84 kg)	So	Cathedral Catholic H.S.	San Diego, California
F	40	Matt Shrigley	6 ft 6 in (1.98 m)	190 lb (86 kg)	RS So	La Costa Canyon H.S.	Encinitas, California

Head coach

- Steve Fisher (Illinois State)

Assistant coach(es)

- Brian Dutcher (Minnesota)
- Justin Hutson (Cal State Bakersfield)
- Dave Velasquez (San Diego State)

Legend

- (C) Team captain
- (S) Suspended
- (I) Ineligible
- (W) Walk-on
- Injured
- Current redshirt

Roster
Last update: January 13, 2015

== Schedule ==
Date time, TV	Rank^{#}	Opponent^{#}	Result	Record	Site (attendance) city, state
Exhibition
July 11, 2014*; 7:00 pm	No. 16	Point Loma Nazarene	W 74–45		Viejas Arena (12,414); San Diego, CA
Non-conference regular season
November 14, 2014*; 7:00 pm, FSSD	No. 16	Cal State Northridge; Maui Invitational Tournament Opening round	W 79–58	1–0	Viejas Arena (12,414); San Diego, CA
November 18, 2014*; 1:00 pm, ESPN	No. 16	No. 25 Utah; ESPN College Basketball Tip-Off Marathon	W 53–49	2–0	Viejas Arena (12,414); San Diego, CA
November 20, 2014*; 7:30 pm, FSSD	No. 16	Cal State Bakersfield	W 51–27	3–0	Viejas Arena (12,414); San Diego, CA
November 24, 2014*; 8:30 pm, ESPN2	No. 15	vs. BYU; Maui Invitational Tournament quarterfinals	W 92–87 ^{2OT}	4–0	Lahaina Civic Center (2,400); Maui, HI
November 25, 2014*; 7:00 pm, ESPN	No. 15	vs. Pittsburgh; Maui Invitational Tournament semifinals	W 74–57	5–0	Lahaina Civic Center (2,400); Maui, HI
November 26, 2014*; 7:00 pm, ESPN	No. 15	vs. No. 3 Arizona; Maui Invitational Tournament championship	L 59–61	5–1	Lahaina Civic Center (2,400); Maui, HI
December 4, 2014*; 8:00 pm, ESPNU	No. 13	San Diego; City Championship	W 57–48	6–1	Viejas Arena (12,414); San Diego, CA
December 7, 2014*; 6:00 pm, P12N	No. 13	at Washington	L 36–49	6–2	Alaska Airlines Arena (6,199); Seattle, WA
December 10, 2014*; 7:00 pm, ESPN3	No. 18	Long Beach State	W 60–59	7–2	Viejas Arena (12,414); San Diego, CA
December 17, 2014*; 6:00 pm, ESPN2	No. 19	at Cincinnati	L 62–71 ^{OT}	7–3	Fifth Third Arena (9,217); Cincinnati, OH
December 20, 2014*; 7:00 pm	No. 19	Ball State	W 70–57	8–3	Viejas Arena (12,414); San Diego, CA
December 22, 2014*; 8:00 pm, FSSD		UC Riverside	W 61–33	9–3	Viejas Arena (12,414); San Diego, CA
December 27, 2014*; 7:00 pm, FSSD		San Diego Christian	W 72–50	10–3	Viejas Arena (12,414); San Diego, CA
Mountain West regular season
December 31, 2014; 2:00 pm, ESPN3		Air Force	W 53–49	11–3 (1–0)	Viejas Arena (12,414); San Diego, CA
January 3, 2015; 7:00 pm, ESPNU		at Fresno State	L 57–59	11–4 (1–1)	Save Mart Center (5,910); Fresno, CA
January 6, 2015; 8:00 pm, CBSSN		New Mexico	W 56–42	12–4 (2–1)	Viejas Arena (12,414); San Diego, CA
January 14, 2015; 8:00 pm, ESPN2		at No. 25 Wyoming	W 60–52	13–4 (3–1)	Arena-Auditorium (6,178); Laramie, WY
January 17, 2015; 3:00 pm, CBSSN		UNLV	W 53–47	14–4 (4–1)	Viejas Arena (12,414); San Diego, CA
January 20, 2015; 6:30 pm, CBSSN		at Air Force	W 77–45	15–4 (5–1)	Clune Arena (1,209); Colorado Springs, CO
January 24, 2015; 7:00 pm, ESPNU		at Colorado State	L 73–79	15–5 (5–2)	Moby Arena (8,745); Fort Collins, CO
January 27, 2015; 6:00 pm, CBSSN		Fresno State	W 58–47	16–5 (6–2)	Viejas Arena (12,414); San Diego, CA
January 31, 2015; 5:00 pm, CBSSN		Utah State	W 62–42	17–5 (7–2)	Viejas Arena (12,414); San Diego, CA
February 4, 2015; 7:00 pm, ESPN3		at Nevada	W 65–63	18–5 (8–2)	Lawlor Events Center (5,832); Reno, NV
February 8, 2015; 3:00 pm, CBSSN		at Boise State	L 46–61	18–6 (8–3)	Taco Bell Arena (10,511); Boise, ID
February 11, 2015; 8:00 pm, CBSSN		Wyoming	W 67–41	19–6 (9–3)	Viejas Arena (12,414); San Diego, CA
February 14, 2015; 5:00 pm, CBSSN		Colorado State	W 72–63	20–6 (10–3)	Viejas Arena (12,414); San Diego, CA
February 17, 2015; 6:30 pm, CBSSN		at New Mexico	W 63–46	21–6 (11–3)	The Pit (15,411); Albuquerque, NM
February 21, 2015; 7:00 pm, ESPN3		at San Jose State	W 74–56	22–6 (12–3)	Event Center Arena (3,477); San Jose, CA
February 28, 2015; 5:00 pm, ESPN2	No. 24	Boise State	L 46–56	22–7 (12–4)	Viejas Arena (12,414); San Diego, CA
March 4, 2015; 8:00 pm, CBSSN		at UNLV	W 60–58	23–7 (13–4)	Thomas & Mack Center (13,454); Paradise, NV
March 7, 2015; 7:00 pm, CBSSN		Nevada	W 67–43	24–7 (14–4)	Viejas Arena (12,414); San Diego, CA
Mountain West tournament
March 12, 2015; 6:00 pm, CBSSN		vs. UNLV; Quarterfinals	W 67–64	25–7	Thomas & Mack Center (8,655); Paradise, NV
March 13, 2015; 8:30 pm, CBSSN		vs. Colorado State; Semifinals	W 56–43	26–7	Thomas & Mack Center (9,199); Paradise, NV
March 14, 2015; 3:00 pm, CBS		vs. Wyoming; Championship game	L 43–45	26–8	Thomas & Mack Center (10,002); Paradise, NV
NCAA tournament
March 20, 2015*; 6:40 pm, CBS	No. (8 S)	vs. (9 S) St. John's; Second round	W 76–64	27–8	Time Warner Cable Arena (16,945); Charlotte, NC
March 22, 2015*; 11:40 am, CBS	No. (8 S)	vs. No. 4 (1 S) Duke; Third round	L 49–68	27–9	Time Warner Cable Arena (18,482); Charlotte, NC
*Non-conference game. ^{#}Rankings from AP Poll. (#) Tournament seedings in parentheses. All times are in Pacific Time. (#) during NCAA Tournament is seed with Region S=South.

== Rankings ==
Ranking movements Legend: ██ Increase in ranking ██ Decrease in ranking — = Not ranked RV = Received votes
	Week																			
Poll	Pre	1	2	3	4	5	6	7	8	9	10	11	12	13	14	15	16	17	18	Final
AP	16	16	15	13	18	19	RV	RV	—	RV	RV	RV	RV	RV	RV	24	RV	RV	—	Not released
Coaches	17	16	15	14	16	17	23	25	RV	RV	RV	RV	RV	RV	25	22	RV	25	RV	RV

*AP does not release post-NCAA Tournament rankings.
