= Anatole de Bengy =

French Jesuit martyr

Anatole de Bengy (born 19 September 1824, executed at the court of the Cité Vincennes, Rue Haxo, Paris 26 May 1871) was one of the five Jesuit martyrs of the Paris Commune, along with Pierre Olivaint.

== Biography ==
De Bengy spent nine years in residence at the Jesuit College of Brugelette, and in 1834 entered the Society of Jesus. During the Crimean War he served as chaplain to the French soldiery and thereafter until 1870 devoted his life to college work. When the Franco-Prussian War broke out, he again sought and obtained the post of chaplain. He rendered service to the poor, sick and wounded during the siege of Paris. After the war he retired to the school of Sainte-Geneviève to resume his work as professor.

At midnight, 3 April, a battalion or National Guards surrounded the school and placed all the Jesuit inmates under arrest as hostages of the Paris Commune. De Bengy cheered up his companions during the dark days of anticipated death. On Friday, 26 May, with two Jesuit companions and some forty other victims, he was led to the court of the Cité Vincennes, Rue Haxo, where he was executed. His remains were placed in a chapel in the Rue de Sèvres.
