= Benjy Taylor =

American college basketball coach (born 1967)

Current position
- Title: Head coach
- Team: Tuskegee
- Conference: SIAC
- Record: 71–53 (.573)

Biographical details
- Born: August 21, 1967 (age 59); Jacksonville, North Carolina, U.S.

Playing career
- 1985–1989: Richmond

Coaching career (HC unless noted)
- 1989–1991: Richmond (GA)
- 1991–1992: Cornell (assistant)
- 1992–1995: The Citadel (assistant)
- 1995–2000: Northern Illinois (assistant)
- 2000–2001: Pepperdine (assistant)
- 2001–2004: North Central
- 2004–2005: Indiana State (assistant)
- 2005–2007: Tulane (assistant)
- 2007–2010: Chicago State
- 2012–2014: Hawaii (assistant)
- 2014–2015: Hawaii (interim)
- 2016: Southeast Missouri State (assistant)
- 2016–2019: Cal State Bakersfield (assistant)
- 2019–present: Tuskegee

Head coaching record
- Overall: 160–165 (.492)

Accomplishments and honors

Championships
- SIAC West division (2023)

Otto Benjamin Taylor Jr. (born August 21, 1967) is an American college basketball coach, currently head coach for Tuskegee. He is a former head men's basketball coach at Chicago State University and former interim head coach at the University of Hawaii.

== Head coaching record ==
Record table
Season	Team	Overall	Conference	Standing	Postseason
North Central Cardinals (College Conference of Illinois and Wisconsin) (2001–2004)
2001–02	North Central	8–17	4–10	7th	
2002–03	North Central	8–17	4–10	6th	
2003–04	North Central	12–12	5–9	6th	
North Central:		28–46 (.378)	13–29 (.310)		
Chicago State Cougars (NCAA Division I independent) (2007–2009)
2007–08	Chicago State	11–17			
2008–09	Chicago State	19–13			
Chicago State Cougars (Great West Conference) (2009–2010)
2009–10	Chicago State	9–23	4–8	T–5th	
Chicago State:		39–53 (.424)	4–8 (.333)		
Hawaii Rainbow Warriors (Big West Conference) (2014–2015)
2014–15	Hawaii	22–13	8–8	5th	
Hawaii:		22–13 (.629)	8–8 (.500)		
Tuskegee Golden Tigers (Southern Intercollegiate Athletic Conference) (2019–present)
2019–20	Tuskegee	17–10	14–5	2nd (West)	
2020–21	Tuskegee	6–7			
2021–22	Tuskegee	15–13	11–7	2nd (West)	
2022–23	Tuskegee	20–8	15–5	T–1st (West)	
2023–24	Tuskegee	13–15	12–8	2nd (West)	
Tuskegee:		71–53 (.573)	52–25 (.675)		
Total:		160–165 (.492)			
National champion Postseason invitational champion Conference regular season champion Conference regular season and conference tournament champion Division regular season champion Division regular season and conference tournament champion Conference tournament champion
