= Benjys =

British sandwich shop chain

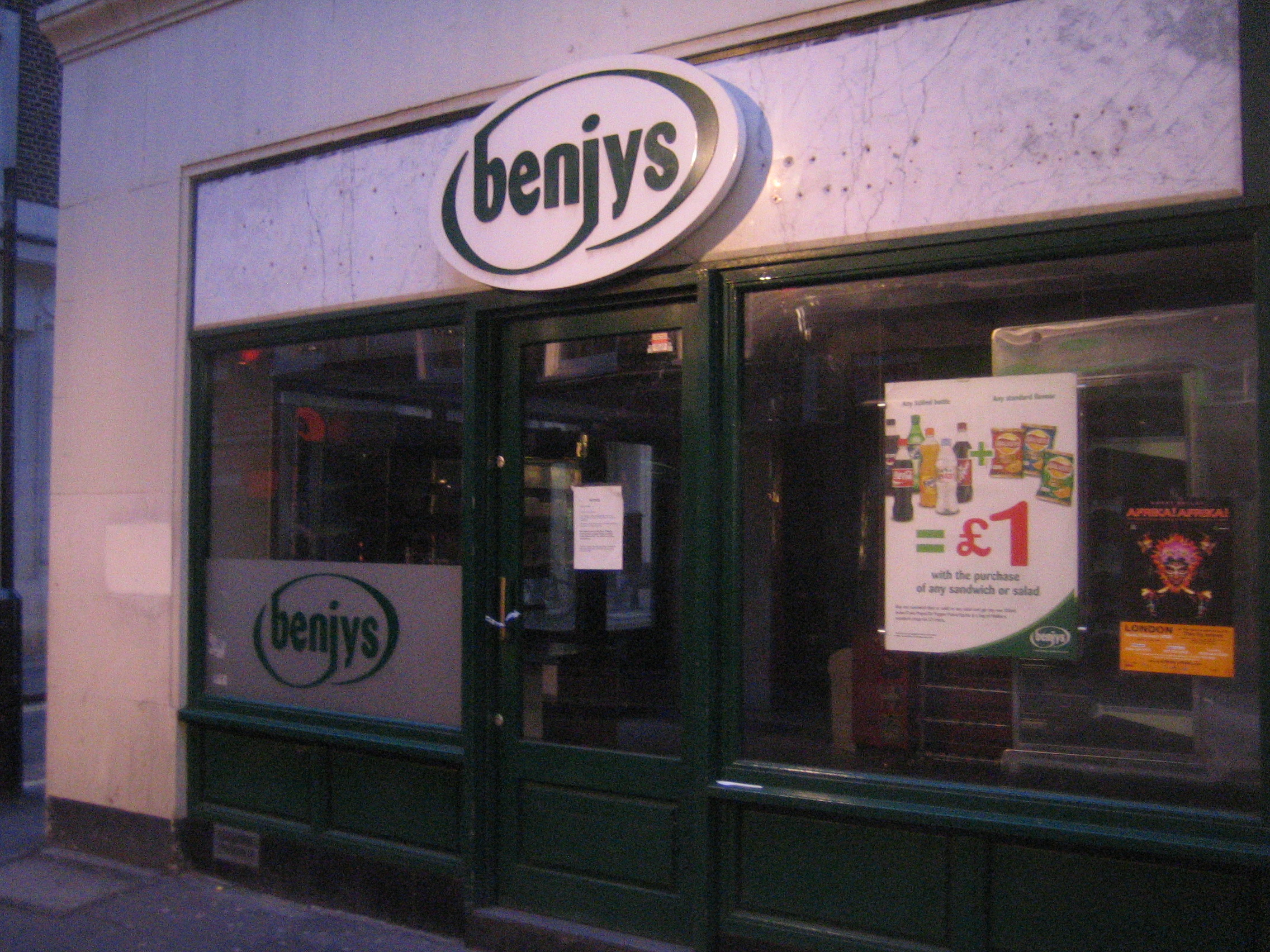
Closed down Benjys outlet at 38 Beak Street, Central London

Benjys was the first low priced chain of sandwich shops in the United Kingdom.

== History ==
The first branch of Benjys was opened in 1989 in Islington by Paul Benjamin. The Benjamin family expanded the company offering low priced takeaway food, until it was sold for around £40 million in Aug 2000.

The range of products included salads, yoghurts, hot food (such as hot sandwiches, jacket potatoes, pies and paninis), fresh fruit, Weight Watchers products, wraps, pastries, tea and coffee, an Atkins followers low-carb range, soft drinks, snack foods, and a range of bread products, including sandwiches, rolls, torpedoes and paninis. All Benjys products were produced at a central production unit based in 90 Monier Road, Bow, East London which was opened in 1999. They employed approximately 200 staff at the unit.

Benjys was awarded Sandwich Retailer of the Year, Sandwich Manufacturer of the Year and Marketeer of the Year by the British Sandwich Association in 2003 and Workplace Sandwich Supplier of the Year in 2005. Benjys Van Franchise ("Vanchise") business, Benjys Delivered, was launched in Sept 2003. The launch went public in September 2003 at the National Franchise Exhibition, held at the NEC. By 2007 there were 100 vans in operation.

In a backed venture capital buyout, the company expanded through franchising. Most of the sixty company branches were located in London and the South East of England, with franchises in major cities outside the South East, such as Leeds, Manchester and Birmingham. The new management expanded turnover further by selling via van-operators in business parks.

By 2006 the chain had 60 stores in London and the South East employing over 650 people.

In 2006, the company went into a pre-packaged administration at the request of Barclays Bank and backers ECI Ventures, and was sold by Deloitte to James Caan-backed Hamilton Bradshaw. Administrators were appointed in February 2007, when the company finally collapsed. At the time, Benjys employed over 650 people.
