= Kyle Wiltjer =

American–Canadian basketball player (born 1992)

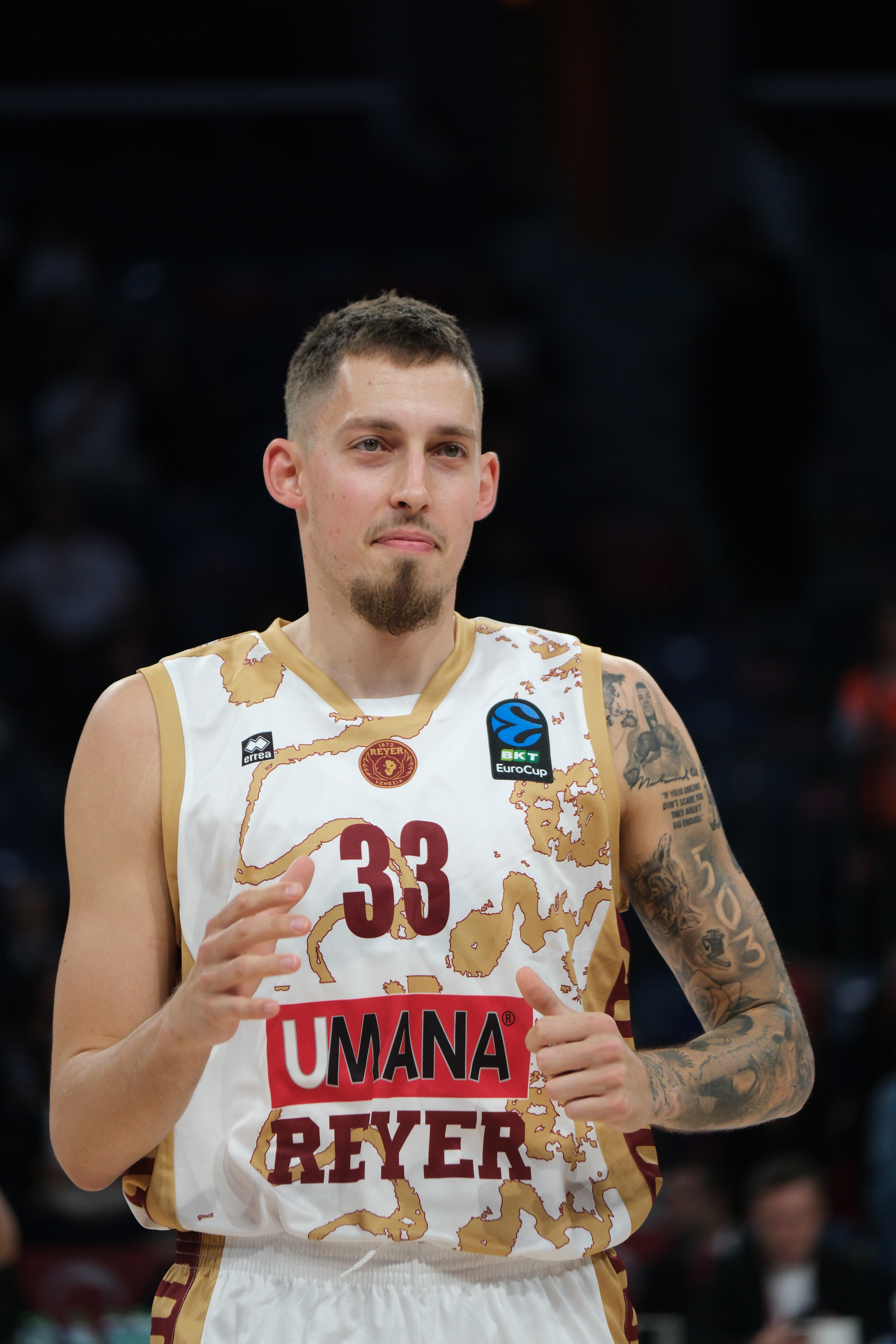
- Wiltjer with Reyer Venezia in 2025

No. 33 – Umana Reyer Venezia
- Position: Power forward
- League: LBA; EuroCup

Personal information
- Born: October 20, 1992 (age 34) Portland, Oregon, U.S.
- Listed height: 6 ft 10 in (2.08 m)
- Listed weight: 240 lb (109 kg)

Career information
- High school: Jesuit (Beaverton, Oregon)
- College: Kentucky (2011–2013); Gonzaga (2014–2016)
- NBA draft: 2016: undrafted
- Playing career: 2016–present

Career history
- 2016–2017: Houston Rockets
- 2016–2017: →Rio Grande Valley Vipers
- 2017–2018: Olympiacos Piraeus
- 2018–2019: Unicaja Malaga
- 2019–2021: Türk Telekom
- 2021–2022: Lenovo Tenerife
- 2022–2023: Zhejiang Lions
- 2023–present: Reyer Venezia

Career highlights
- Champions League champion (2022); All-Champions League Second Team (2020); Liga ACB three-point field goal percentage leader (2022); NCAA champion (2012); Consensus second-team All-American (2015); 2× First-team All-WCC (2015, 2016); WCC Newcomer of the Year (2015); 2× WCC tournament MOP (2015, 2016); SEC Sixth Man of the Year (2013); McDonald's All-American (2011)
- Stats at NBA.com
- Stats at Basketball Reference
Medals
Men's basketball
Representing Canada
FIBA Americas U-18 Championship
Bronze medal – third place	2010 San Antonio
Pan American Games
Silver medal – second place	2015 Toronto

Kyle Gregory Wiltjer (born October 20, 1992) is a Canadian-American professional basketball player for Reyer Venezia Mestre of the Italian Lega Basket Serie A (LBA) and the EuroCup. He spent two seasons of college basketball with the Kentucky Wildcats before transferring to play with the Gonzaga Bulldogs in 2013. A dual citizen of the U.S. and Canada, he has played for the Canada national team.

== High school career ==
Born and raised in Portland, Wiltjer attended Jesuit High School in Beaverton, Oregon, where he led the school to three consecutive Oregon state championships.

Wiltjer played in the 2011 McDonald's All-American Game in Chicago. He also played in the 2011 Nike Hoop Summit in his hometown of Portland and in the 2011 Jordan Brand Classic in Charlotte.

== College recruiting and career ==
Wiltjer was ranked as the No. 18 recruit in the class of 2011 in the ESPNU 100, the No. 25 recruit by Rivals.com, and the No. 22 recruit by Scout.com. He chose to play basketball for the University of Kentucky Wildcats and coach John Calipari on August 28, 2010. He had also considered Kansas, California, Texas, Gonzaga, Georgia Tech, and Wake Forest.

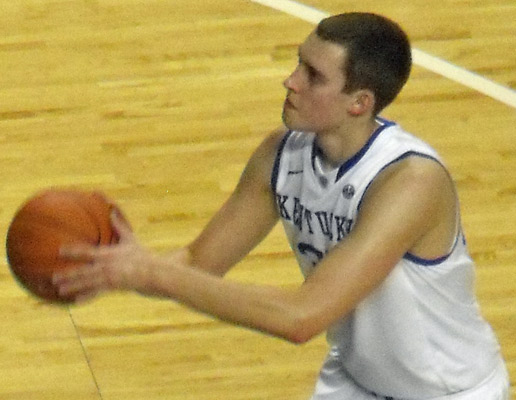
Wiltjer with the Kentucky Wildcats.

Although he was a five-star recruit according to all of the recruiting analysts, Wiltjer never started a game his freshman season at Kentucky, and did not play as many minutes as fellow freshmen Anthony Davis, Michael Kidd-Gilchrist, and Marquis Teague. He averaged only 11.3 MPG and 4.8 PPG, although his three-point percentage was an impressive 42.5%. The Kentucky Wildcats won the 2012 NCAA championship during Wiltjer's freshman year.

Wiltjer began the 2012–13 season as a starter. In his third game of the season, against Lafayette, he accumulated 23 points, two assists, and four rebounds. However, he would eventually settle into an off-the-bench role, being named the SEC's Sixth Man of the Year.

In April 2013, he had announced he would remain at Kentucky for his junior season. However, he eventually changed his mind, posting a letter on Kentucky's official athletic website on June 23 indicating that he would transfer in order to "compete the way I know I can. ... wherever that may be." A later report indicated that Wiltjer had drawn interest from three of the four Division I programs in his home state of Oregon (Oregon, Oregon State, Portland), Gonzaga, Stanford, and Texas. According to that report, "he left the door open to return to Kentucky if he can't find the right situation." On July 19, multiple media outlets reported that Wiltjer had chosen Gonzaga. The transfer became official the next day, when Gonzaga received a signed copy of a financial aid agreement. After sitting out the 2013–14 season due to NCAA transfer rules, he had two remaining seasons of eligibility.

In February 2015 he scored a career-high 45 points against Pacific. Wiltjer led Gonzaga to its second ever Elite Eight appearance and a school record 35–3 record. He was named a Consensus Second-Team All-American, as well as First-Team All-WCC and WCC Newcomer of the Year. In his first season with Gonzaga he appeared in 38 games averaging 16.8 points per game, 6.2 rebounds per game and 1.9 assists per game in 27.6 minutes per game. After contemplating forgoing his remaining eligibility to enter the 2015 NBA draft, Wiltjer decided to return to Gonzaga for his senior year.

Entering his second season with Gonzaga, Wiltjer was named CBS Sports' preseason player of the year. Sports Illustrated projected Wiltjer as the preseason player of the year, scoring champion, and the top-usage player in all of NCAA Division 1 basketball. He was named to the 35-man midseason watchlist for the Naismith Trophy on February 11.

== Professional career ==
=== Houston Rockets (2016–2017) ===
After going undrafted in the 2016 NBA draft, Wiltjer joined the Houston Rockets for the 2016 NBA Summer League. On September 23, 2016, he signed with the Rockets. Wiltjer appeared in four of the Rockets' first 25 games of the 2016–17 season, scoring a total of three points. On December 14, 2016, he scored a season-high seven points in a 132–98 win over the Sacramento Kings. During his rookie season, Wiltjer had multiple assignments with the Rio Grande Valley Vipers, the Rockets' D-League affiliate.

On June 28, 2017, the Los Angeles Clippers acquired Wiltjer, Patrick Beverley, Sam Dekker, Montrezl Harrell, Darrun Hilliard, DeAndre Liggins, Lou Williams and a 2018 Top 3 Protected first-round pick (which ended up being pick #30) from the Houston Rockets in exchange for Chris Paul. He was later waived by the Clippers on July 15, 2017.

=== Olympiacos (2017–2018) ===
On August 15, 2017, Wiltjer signed with the Toronto Raptors. On October 7 he was waived by the Raptors. On October 21, he signed with the Toronto Raptors' NBA G League affiliate, the Raptors 905.

On October 29, 2017, Wiltjer signed with Olympiacos Piraeus of the Greek Basket League and the EuroLeague.

=== Unicaja (2018–2019) ===
On July 3, 2018, Wiltjer signed a one-year deal with Unicaja of the Spanish Liga ACB.

=== Türk Telekom (2019–2021) ===
Wiltjer signed with Türk Telekom in July 2019. He averaged 12.7 points, 5.1 rebounds, and 1.5 assists per game in the 2019–20 season, and then averaged 18.5 points, 5.9 rebounds and 2.2 assists per game in the 2020–21 season.

=== Canarias (2021–2022) ===
On July 13, 2021, Wiltjer signed a one-year contract with Lenovo Tenerife of the Spanish Liga ACB.

=== Zhejiang Lions (2022–2023) ===
On October 2, 2022, Wiltjer signed with the Zhejiang Lions of the Chinese Basketball Association (CBA).

=== Reyer Venezia (2023–present) ===
On September 21, 2023, Wiltjer signed with Reyer Venezia Mestre of the Italian Lega Basket Serie A (LBA).

== National team career ==
=== Canada junior national team ===
As a member of the Canadian Under-18 junior national team, Wiltjer won a bronze medal at the 2010 FIBA Americas Under-18 Championship. As a member of the Canadian university national team, he played at the 2013 World University Games.

=== Canada senior national team ===
With the senior Canada national basketball team, Wiltjer played at the 2015 Pan American Games, where he won a silver medal.

In 2019, Wiltjer participated in the 2019 FIBA Basketball World Cup in China. Wiltjer was the team leader in point per game at 16.4. The team finished 21st out of 32 teams.

== Career statistics ==
Legend
GP	Games played	GS	Games started	MPG	Minutes per game
FG%	Field-goal percentage	3P%	3-point field-goal percentage	FT%	Free-throw percentage
RPG	Rebounds per game	APG	Assists per game	SPG	Steals per game
BPG	Blocks per game	PPG	Points per game	PIR	Performance index rating
**Bold**	Career high

=== Professional ===
==== NBA ====
===== Regular season =====
Year	Team	GP	GS	MPG	FG%	3P%	FT%	RPG	APG	SPG	BPG	PPG
2016–17	Houston	14	0	3.1	.286	.308	.500	.7	.1	.2	.1	.9

==== Playoffs ====
Year	Team	GP	GS	MPG	FG%	3P%	FT%	RPG	APG	SPG	BPG	PPG
2016–17	Houston	1	0	5.0	1.000	1.000	–	.0	.0	.0	.0	3.0

==== EuroLeague ====
Year	Team	GP	GS	MPG	FG%	3P%	FT%	RPG	APG	SPG	BPG	PPG	PIR
2017–18	Olympiacos	24	2	9.4	.476	.420	.667	1.4	.1	.2	.1	4.5	3.3
Career		24	2	9.4	.476	.420	.667	1.4	.1	.2	.1	4.5	3.3

=== College ===
Year	Team	GP	GS	MPG	FG%	3P%	FT%	RPG	APG	SPG	BPG	PPG
2011–12	Kentucky	**40**	0	11.6	.438	.432	.815	1.8	0.4	0.1	0.4	5.0
2012–13	Kentucky	33	10	23.8	.421	.367	.810	4.2	1.5	0.4	0.4	10.2
2014–15	Gonzaga	38	**37**	27.6	**.540**	**.466**	.789	6.2	**1.9**	**0.5**	0.7	16.8
2015–16	Gonzaga	36	36	**33.6**	.491	.437	**.857**	**6.3**	1.5	0.4	**0.8**	**20.4**
Career		147	83	23.8	.487	.425	.814	4.6	1.3	0.3	0.6	13.0

== Awards and honors ==
=== High school ===
- 2011 McDonald's All-American team selection
- 2011 Jordan Brand Classic High School All-American team selection
- 2011 Nike Hoop Summit World team selection
- 2011 Gatorade Player of the Year – Oregon

=== College ===
- 2012 NCAA National Champion – Kentucky
- 2013 SEC Sixth Man of the Year
- 2015 WCC Newcomer of the year
- 2015 First-Team All-WCC
- 2015 USBWA Second-Team All-American

== Personal life ==
Wiltjer's father, Greg, is a former Canadian professional basketball player who was a member of the Canadian national basketball team at the 1984 Summer Olympics. His paternal half-sister and Greg's daughter, Jordan Adams, is also a former professional player. Both Greg and Adams also represented Canada. Through Adams, Wiltjer has two nieces.

Wiltjer and his former girlfriend Charday Hunt, who was a Sacramento State Hornets player and later a Nike employee, married in Ios, Greece, in 2019.
