= 2014–15 West Coast Conference men's basketball season =

- League: NCAA Division I
- Sport: Men's basketball
- Teams: 10
- TV partner(s): National: ESPN, BYUtv, WCC TV

Regular season
- Season champions: Gonzaga
- Runners-up: BYU
- Season MVP: Kevin Pangos, Gonzaga
- Top scorer: Tyler Haws, BYU

Tournament
- Champions: Gonzaga
- Runners-up: BYU
- Finals MVP: Kyle Wiltjer, Gonzaga

Basketball seasons
- ← 13–14 15–16 →

2014–15 West Coast Conference men's basketball standings
| | Conf. | | | | Overall |
| Team | W | | L | PCT | W | | L | PCT |
|---|---|---|---|---|---|---|---|---|
| No. 7 Gonzaga † | 17 | – | 1 | .944 | 35 | – | 3 | .921 |
| BYU | 13 | – | 5 | .722 | 25 | – | 10 | .714 |
| Saint Mary's | 13 | – | 5 | .722 | 21 | – | 10 | .677 |
| Pepperdine | 10 | – | 8 | .556 | 18 | – | 14 | .563 |
| San Diego | 8 | – | 10 | .444 | 15 | – | 16 | .484 |
| Portland | 7 | – | 11 | .389 | 17 | – | 16 | .515 |
| Santa Clara | 7 | – | 11 | .389 | 14 | – | 18 | .438 |
| San Francisco | 7 | – | 11 | .389 | 14 | – | 18 | .438 |
| Pacific | 4 | – | 14 | .222 | 12 | – | 19 | .387 |
| Loyola Marymount | 4 | – | 14 | .222 | 8 | – | 23 | .258 |
† Conference tournament winner Rankings from AP poll

The 2014–15 West Coast Conference men's basketball season will begin with practices in October 2014 and end with the 2015 West Coast Conference men's basketball tournament at the Orleans Arena March 6–10, 2015 in Paradise, Nevada. The regular season will begin in November, with the conference schedule starting at the end of December.

This will be the 30th season for WCC men's basketball, which began in the 1985–86 season when the league was known as the West Coast Athletic Conference (WCAC). It will also be the 26th season under the West Coast Conference name (the conference began as the California Basketball Association in 1952, became the WCAC in 1956, and dropped the word "Athletic" in 1989).

== Pre-season ==
- Pre-season media day will take place in September or October at the Time Warner Cable SportsNet and Time Warner Cable Deportes Studios. Video interviews will be hosted on the WCC's streaming video outlet, TheW.tv, beginning at 11:30 AM PDT. Jeff Lampe of WCC Live interviewed each coach and got a preview of their respective season. The regional television schedule announcement, the Pre-season Conference team, and the pre-season coaches rankings were some of the additional events that took place.

=== 2014–15 West Coast Men's Basketball Media Poll ===
The Pre-season poll will be announced at the conferences media day in September or October 2014.

Rank, School (first-place votes), Points
1. Gonzaga (9), 81
2. BYU (1), 69
3. St. Mary's, 62
4. San Francisco, 59
5. San Diego, 47
6. Portland, 45
7. Pepperdine, 29
7. Santa Clara, 29
9. Loyola Marymount, 19
10. Pacific, 10

=== 2014–15 West Coast Men's Preseason All-West Conference Team ===
Player, School, Yr., Pos.
Jared Brownridge, Santa Clara, So., G
Kyle Collinsworth, BYU, Jr., G
Stacy Davis, Pepperdine, Jr., F
Johnny Dee, San Diego, Sr., G
Tyler Haws, BYU, Sr., G
Przemek Karnowski, Gonzaga, Jr., C
Kevin Pangos, Gonzaga, Sr., G
Kruize Pinkins, San Francisco, Sr., F
Thomas van der Mars, Portland, Sr., C
Brad Waldow, Saint Mary's, Sr., C

== Rankings ==
The AP Poll does not do a post-season rankings. As a result, their last rankings are Week 19. The Coaches Poll does a post-season poll and the end of the NCAA Tournament.

Legend
| | Improvement in ranking |
| | Drop in ranking |
| RV | Received votes but were not ranked in Top 25 of poll |

| | | Pre/ Wk 1 | Wk 2 | Wk 3 | Wk 4 | Wk 5 | Wk 6 | Wk 7 | Wk 8 | Wk 9 | Wk 10 | Wk 11 | Wk 12 | Wk 13 | Wk 14 | Wk 15 | Wk 16 | Wk 17 | Wk 18 | Wk 19 | Post |
|---|---|---|---|---|---|---|---|---|---|---|---|---|---|---|---|---|---|---|---|---|---|
| BYU | AP | RV | RV | RV | | | | | | RV | | | | | | | | RV | RV | RV | |
| BYU | C | | | | | | | | | RV | | | | | | | | RV | RV | RV | |
| Gonzaga | AP | 13 | 13 | 10 | 9 | 9 | 8 | 8 | 7 | 6 | 3 | 3 | 3 | 2 | 3 | 3 | 3 | 7 | 7 | 7 | |
| Gonzaga | C | 13 | 11 | 8 | 8 | 8 | 8 | 8 | 8 | 7 | 3 | 3 | 3 | 2 | 2 | 2 | 2 | 7 | 7 | 7 | |
| Loyola Marymount | AP | | | | | | | | | | | | | | | | | | | | |
| Loyola Marymount | C | | | | | | | | | | | | | | | | | | | | |
| Pacific | AP | | | | | | | | | | | | | | | | | | | | |
| Pacific | C | | | | | | | | | | | | | | | | | | | | |
| Pepperdine | AP | | | | | | | | | | | | | | | | | | | | |
| Pepperdine | C | | | | | | | | | | | | | | | | | | | | |
| Portland | AP | | | | | | | | | | | | | | | | | | | | |
| Portland | C | | | | | | | | | | | | | | | | | | | | |
| Saint Mary's | AP | | | | RV | | | | | | | RV | RV | | | | | | | | |
| Saint Mary's | C | RV | | RV | RV | RV | RV | RV | | RV | RV | RV | RV | | | | | | | | |
| San Diego | AP | | | | | | | | | | | | | | | | | | | | |
| San Diego | C | | | | | | | | | | | | | | | | | | | | |
| San Francisco | AP | | | | | | | | | | | | | | | | | | | | |
| San Francisco | C | | | | | | | | | | | | | | | | | | | | |
| Santa Clara | AP | | | | | | | | | | | | | | | | | | | | |
| Santa Clara | C | | | | | | | | | | | | | | | | | | | | |

== Non-Conference games ==
- Gonzaga defeated #22 SMU 72—56.

== Conference games ==
=== Composite Matrix ===
This table summarizes the head-to-head results between teams in conference play. (x) indicates games remaining this season.

| | BYU | Gonzaga | LMU | Pacific | Pepperdine | Portland | Saint Mary's | San Diego | San Francisco | Santa Clara |
|---|---|---|---|---|---|---|---|---|---|---|
| vs. Brigham Young | - | 1–1 | 0–2 | 0–2 | 2–0 | 0–2 | 1–1 | 1–1 | 0–2 | 0–2 |
| vs. Gonzaga | 1–1 | – | 0–2 | 0–2 | 0–2 | 0–2 | 0–2 | 0–2 | 0–2 | 0–2 |
| vs. Loyola Marymount | 2–0 | 2–0 | – | 1–1 | 2–0 | 1–1 | 2–0 | 1–1 | 1–1 | 2–0 |
| vs. Pacific | 2–0 | 2–0 | 1–1 | - | 2–0 | 1–1 | 2–0 | 1–1 | 2–0 | 1–1 |
| vs. Pepperdine | 0–2 | 2–0 | 0–2 | 0–2 | - | 1–1 | 1–1 | 1–1 | 2–0 | 1–1 |
| vs. Portland | 2–0 | 2–0 | 1–1 | 1–1 | 1–1 | - | 2–0 | 1–1 | 1–1 | 0–2 |
| vs. Saint Mary's | 1–1 | 2–0 | 0–2 | 0–2 | 1–1 | 0–2 | - | 0–2 | 0–2 | 1–1 |
| vs. San Diego | 1–1 | 2–0 | 1–1 | 1–1 | 1–1 | 1–1 | 2–0 | - | 0–2 | 1–1 |
| vs. San Francisco | 2–0 | 2–0 | 1–1 | 0–2 | 0–2 | 1–1 | 2–0 | 2–0 | - | 1–1 |
| vs. Santa Clara | 2–0 | 2–0 | 0–2 | 1–1 | 1–1 | 2–0 | 1–1 | 1–1 | 1–1 | - |
| Total | 13–5 | 17–1 | 4–14 | 4–14 | 10–8 | 7–11 | 13–5 | 8–10 | 7–11 | 7-11 |

== Conference tournament ==
- March 5–10, 2015– West Coast Conference Basketball Tournament, Orleans Arena, Paradise, Nevada.

First round Friday, March 6 BYUtv
8 | San Francisco | 62
9 | Pacific | 58
7 | Santa Clara | 85
10 | Loyola Marymount | 54

Quarterfinals; Saturday, March 7 WCC TV & BYUtv (afternoon); ESPN2 (evening)
1 | Gonzaga | 81
8 | San Francisco | 72
4 | Pepperdine | 50
5 | San Diego | 47
2 | Brigham Young | 78
7 | Santa Clara | 76
3 | Saint Mary's | 52
6 | Portland | 69

Semifinals; Monday, March 9 ESPN (early); ESPN2 (late)
1 | Gonzaga | 79
4 | Pepperdine | 61
2 | BYU | 84
6 | Portland | 70

Championship Game; Tuesday, March 10; ESPN (tv); Westwood One (radio)
1 | Gonzaga | 91
2 | BYU | 75

== Head coaches ==
Dave Rose, BYU
Mark Few, Gonzaga
Max Good, Loyola Marymount
Ron Verlin, Pacific
Marty Wilson, Pepperdine
Eric Reveno, Portland
Randy Bennett, Saint Mary's
Bill Grier, San Diego
Rex Walters, San Francisco
Kerry Keating, Santa Clara

== Postseason ==
=== NIT ===
| Seed | Bracket | School | First round | Second round | Quarterfinals | Semifinals | Finals |

=== CBI ===
| School | First round | Quarterfinals | Semifinals | Finals Game 1 | Finals Game 2 | Finals Game 3 |

== Awards and honors ==
=== WCC Player-of-the-Week ===
The WCC player of the week awards are given each Monday once the season begins.

- Nov. 17- Brandon Clark, G, Santa Clara
- Dec. 1- Kevin Pangos, G, Gonzaga
- Dec. 15- Kyle Wiltjer, F, Gonzaga
- Dec. 30- Kyle Collinsworth, G, BYU
- Jan. 12- Stacy Davis, F, Pepperdine
- Jan. 26- Brandon Clark, G, Santa Clara
- Feb. 9- Kyle Collinsworth, G, BYU
- Feb. 23- Kyle Wiltjer, F, Gonzaga
- Nov. 24- Brad Waldow, F, Saint Mary's
- Dec. 8- Kyle Collinsworth, G, BYU
- Dec. 22- Dulani Robinson, G, Pacific
- Jan. 5- Przemek Karnowski, C, Gonzaga
- Jan. 19- Brad Waldow, F, Saint Mary's
- Feb. 2- Domantas Sabonis, F, Gonzaga
- Feb. 16- Kyle Wiltjer, F, Gonzaga
- Mar. 2- Kyle Collinsworth, G, BYU

=== College Madness West Coast Player of the Week ===
College Madness WCC player of the Week Awards will be given every Sunday once the season begins.

- Nov. 16- Brandon Clark, G, Santa Clara
- Nov. 30- Kyle Wiltjer, F, Gonzaga
- Dec. 14- Aaron Bright, G, Saint Mary's
- Dec. 28- Brad Waldow, F, Saint Mary's
- Jan. 11- Stacy Davis, F, Pepperdine
- Jan. 25- Brandon Clark, G, Santa Clara
- Feb. 8- Kyle Collinsworth, G, BYU
- Feb. 22- Kyle Wiltjer, F, Gonzaga
- Nov. 23- Brad Waldow, F, Saint Mary's
- Dec. 7- Kyle Collinsworth, G, BYU
- Dec. 21- T.J. Wallace, G, Pacific
- Jan. 4- Kyle Collinsworth, G, BYU
- Jan. 18- Brad Waldow, F, Saint Mary's
- Feb. 1- Johnny Dee, G, San Diego
- Feb. 15- Kyle Collinsworth, G, BYU
- Mar. 1- Kyle Collinsworth, G, BYU

=== National Player of the Week Awards ===
To Be Determined after the season begins.

=== First-Team All-Conference ===
The voting body for all conference awards is league coaches and will take place at the end of the season.

| Player | School | Year | Position |
| Jared Brownridge | Santa Clara | Sophomore | G |
| Kerry Carter | Saint Mary's | Senior | G |
| Kyle Collinsworth | BYU | Junior | G |
| Stacy Davis | Pepperdine | Junior | F |
| Johnny Dee | San Diego | Senior | G |
| Tyler Haws | BYU | Senior | G |
| Przemek Karnowski | Gonzaga | Junior | C |
| Kevin Pangos | Gonzaga | Senior | G |
| Brad Waldow | Saint Mary's | Senior | C |
| Kyle Wiltjer | Gonzaga | Junior | F |

=== Second-Team All-Conference ===
| Player | School | Year | Position |
| Gary Bell | Gonzaga | Senior | G |
| Domantas Sabonis | Gonzaga | Freshman | F |
| Mark Tollefsen | San Francisco | Junior | F |
| Byron Wesley | Gonzaga | Senior | G |
| Alec Wintering | Portland | Sophomore | G |

=== Honorable Mention ===
| Name | School |
|---|---|
| Christopher Anderson | San Diego |
| Kevin Bailey | Portland |
| Aaron Bright | Saint Mary's |
| Brandon Clark | Santa Clara |
| Jett Raines | Pepperdine |
| Thomas van der Mars | Portland |
| T.J. Wallace | Pacific |
| Anson Winder | BYU |

=== All-Freshman ===
| Player | School | Position |
|---|---|---|
| Matt Hubbard | Santa Clara | F |
| Emmett Naar | Saint Mary's | G |
| Shawn Olden | Pepperdine | G |
| Domantas Sabonis | Gonzaga | F |
| Devin Watson | San Francisco | G |

== See also ==
- 2014-15 NCAA Division I men's basketball season
- West Coast Conference men's basketball tournament
- 2014–15 West Coast Conference women's basketball season
- West Coast Conference women's basketball tournament
- 2015 West Coast Conference women's basketball tournament
