= 2014–15 San Francisco Dons men's basketball team =

American college basketball season

2014–15 San Francisco Dons men's basketball
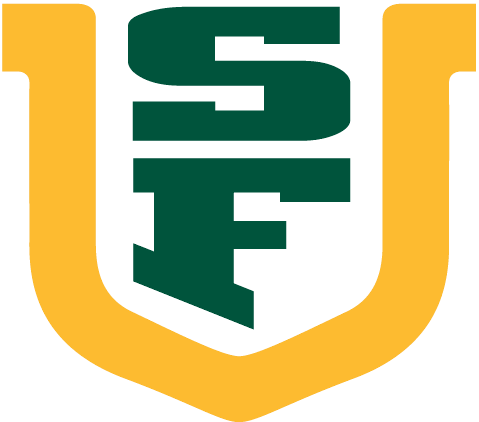
- Conference: West Coast Conference
- Record: 14–18 (7–11 WCC)
- Head coach: Rex Walters (7th season)
- Assistant coaches: Luke Wicks; Brent Crews; David Rebibo
- Home arena: War Memorial Gymnasium

2014–15 West Coast Conference men's basketball standings
	Conf.				Overall
Team	W		L	PCT	W		L	PCT
No. 7 Gonzaga †	17	–	1	.944	35	–	3	.921
BYU	13	–	5	.722	25	–	10	.714
Saint Mary's	13	–	5	.722	21	–	10	.677
Pepperdine	10	–	8	.556	18	–	14	.563
San Diego	8	–	10	.444	15	–	16	.484
Portland	7	–	11	.389	17	–	16	.515
Santa Clara	7	–	11	.389	14	–	18	.438
San Francisco	7	–	11	.389	14	–	18	.438
Pacific	4	–	14	.222	12	–	19	.387
Loyola Marymount	4	–	14	.222	8	–	23	.258
† Conference tournament winner Rankings from AP poll

The 2014–15 San Francisco Dons men's basketball team represented the University of San Francisco during the 2014–15 NCAA Division I men's basketball season. It was head coach Rex Walters seventh season at San Francisco. The Dons played their home games at the War Memorial Gymnasium and were members of the West Coast Conference. They finished the season 14–18, 7–11 in WCC play to finish in a three way tie for sixth place. They advanced to the quarterfinals of the WCC tournament where they lost to Gonzaga.

== Previous season ==
The Dons finished the season 21–12, 13–5 in WCC play to finish in a tie for second place. They advanced to the semifinals of the WCC tournament where they lost to BYU. They were invited to the National Invitation Tournament where they lost in the first round to LSU.

== Departures ==
Name	Number	Pos.	Height	Weight	Year	Hometown	Notes
Avry Holmes	12	G	6'2"	196	Sophomore	Salem, OR	Transferred to Clemson
Cole Dickerson	25	F	6'7"	227	Senior	Federal Way, WA	Graduated
Tao Xu	35	C	6'11"	277	Sophomore	Qingdao, China	Signed to play professionally in China
Cody Doolin	45	G	6'2"	183	Senior	Austin, TX	Left the team for personal reasons

=== Incoming transfers ===
Name	Number	Pos.	Height	Weight	Year	Hometown	Previous School
Montray Clemons	0	F	6'7"	235	Junior	Baltimore, MD	Junior college transfer from Pensacola State College.

== Recruiting Class of 2014 ==
College recruiting
Name	Hometown	School	Height	Weight	Commit date
Devin Watson; G	El Cajon, CA	El Camino	6 ft 0 in (1.83 m)	155 lb (70 kg)	Jun 1, 2014
Devin Watson; G	Recruit ratings: Scout: Rivals: (75)				
Chase Foster; G	Highlands Ranch, CO	Valor Christian	6 ft 3 in (1.91 m)	175 lb (79 kg)	Sep 3, 2013
Chase Foster; G	Recruit ratings: Scout: Rivals: (70)				
Frankie Ferrari; G	Burlingame, CA	Burlingame	5 ft 11 in (1.80 m)	160 lb (73 kg)	Aug 2, 2013
Frankie Ferrari; G	Recruit ratings: Scout: Rivals: (62)				
Jared Stutzman; F	Idaho Falls, ID	Bonneville	6 ft 5 in (1.96 m)	190 lb (86 kg)	May 9, 2013
Jared Stutzman; F	Recruit ratings: Scout: Rivals: (60)				
Overall recruit ranking: Scout: nr Rivals: nr ESPN: nr
Note: In many cases, Scout, Rivals, 247Sports, On3, and ESPN may conflict in their listings of height and weight.; In these cases, the average was taken. ESPN grades are on a 100-point scale.; Sources: "San Francisco Dons 2014 Basketball Commitments". Rivals.; "2014 San Francisco Dons Basketball Commits". Scout.; "ESPN". ESPN.; "Scout.com Team Recruiting Rankings". Scout.; "2014 Team Ranking". Rivals.

=== Recruiting Class of 2015 ===
College recruiting
Name	Hometown	School	Height	Weight	Commit date
Cedric Wright; G	Fort Lauderdale, FL	Dillard	6 ft 6 in (1.98 m)	N/A	Jul 2, 2014
Cedric Wright; G	Recruit ratings: Scout: Rivals: (NR)				
Overall recruit ranking: Scout: nr Rivals: nr ESPN: nr
Note: In many cases, Scout, Rivals, 247Sports, On3, and ESPN may conflict in their listings of height and weight.; In these cases, the average was taken. ESPN grades are on a 100-point scale.; Sources: "San Francisco Dons 2015 Basketball Commitments". Rivals.; "2015 San Francisco Dons Basketball Commits". Scout.; "ESPN". ESPN.; "Scout.com Team Recruiting Rankings". Scout.; "2015 Team Ranking". Rivals.

== Roster ==
2014–15 San Francisco Dons men's basketball team
Players
Coaches

Pos.	#	Name	Height	Weight	Year	Previous school	Hometown
F	0	Montray Clemsons	6 ft 7 in (2.01 m)	235 lb (107 kg)	Jr	Baltimore Poly Ins; Pensacola State College	Baltimore, MD
G	1	Corey Hilliard	6 ft 1 in (1.85 m)	185 lb (84 kg)	Sr	Raytown South; Nebraska; Midland College	Kansas City, MO
F	2	Uche Ofoegbu	6 ft 4 in (1.93 m)	214 lb (97 kg)	RS So	John Paul Stevens; SMU	San Antonio, TX
F	3	Matt Christiansen	6 ft 9 in (2.06 m)	235 lb (107 kg)	Jr	Bishop McGuiness	Oklahoma City, OK
G	5	Matt Glover	6 ft 5 in (1.96 m)	212 lb (96 kg)	RS Sr	Tustin	Orange, CA
G	10	Chris Adams	6 ft 4 in (1.93 m)	194 lb (88 kg)	Sr	Damien	Covina, CA
G	11	Gavin Hoffmann	6 ft 5 in (1.96 m)	204 lb (93 kg)	Sr	Lincoln	Portland, OR
G	13	Frankie Ferrari	5 ft 11 in (1.8 m)	160 lb (73 kg)	Fr	Burlingame	Burlingame, CA
G	14	David Irby	6 ft 0 in (1.83 m)	180 lb (82 kg)	So	Walnut Hills	Long Beach, CA
F	15	Kruize Pinkins	6 ft 7 in (2.01 m)	230 lb (104 kg)	Sr	Marianna; Chipola College	Marianna, FL
G	21	Devin Watson	6 ft 1 in (1.85 m)	165 lb (75 kg)	Fr	El Camino	Oceanside, CA
F	22	Chase Foster	6 ft 5 in (1.96 m)	170 lb (77 kg)	Fr	Valor Christian	Highlands Ranch, CO
F	23	Mark Tollefsen	6 ft 9 in (2.06 m)	199 lb (90 kg)	RS Jr	San Ramon Valley	Danville, CA
C	25	Darrell Robertson	6 ft 10 in (2.08 m)	242 lb (110 kg)	RS Jr	Mendenhall; DePaul	Pinola, MS
G	30	Dominique Williams (W)	6 ft 2 in (1.88 m)	170 lb (77 kg)	So	IMG Academy	El Granada, CA
G	32	Tim Derksen	6 ft 3 in (1.91 m)	202 lb (92 kg)	Jr	Amphitheater	Tucson, AZ
F	33	Nick Loew (W)	6 ft 8 in (2.03 m)	230 lb (104 kg)	Fr	Burlingame	Burlingame, CA

Head coach

- Rex Walters (Kansas)

Assistant coach(es)

- Luke Wicks (Northern State)
- Brent Crews (Florida Atlantic)
- David Rebibo (Cal State Northridge)

Legend

- (C) Team captain
- (S) Suspended
- (I) Ineligible
- (W) Walk-on
- Injured
- Current redshirt

Roster

== Schedule and results ==
Date time, TV	Opponent	Result	Record	Site (attendance) city, state
Non-conference regular season
11/16/2014*; 7:00 pm, TheW.tv	South Carolina State	W 91–52	1–0	War Memorial Gymnasium (1,525); San Francisco, CA
11/19/2014*; 7:00 pm, TheW.tv	Notre Dame de Namur	W 86–46	2–0	War Memorial Gymnasium (1,327); San Francisco, CA
11/24/2014*; 5:30 pm	vs. Hawaiʻi; Gulf Coast Showcase quarterfinals	W 88–73	3–0	Germain Arena (2,118); Estero, FL
11/25/2014*; 5:30 pm	vs. Florida Gulf Coast; Gulf Coast Showcase semifinals	L 47–62	3–1	Germain Arena (3,027); Estero, FL
11/26/2014*; 3:00 pm	vs. Evansville; Gulf Coast Showcase 3rd place game	L 72–79	3–2	Germain Arena (3,867); Estero, FL
11/30/2014*; 3:00 pm, TheW.tv	Montana	W 76–57	4–2	War Memorial Gymnasium (1,695); San Francisco, CA
12/03/2014*; 6:00 pm, P12N	at Colorado	L 55–72	4–3	Coors Events Center (9,025); Boulder, CO
12/07/2014*; 7:00 pm, TheW.tv	Houston Baptist	W 85–54	5–3	War Memorial Gymnasium (1,223); San Francisco, CA
12/11/2014*; 7:00 pm, TheW.tv	Eastern Washington	L 76–81	5–4	War Memorial Gymnasium (1,351); San Francisco, CA
12/15/2014*; 7:00 pm, TheW.tv	Cal Poly	L 71–78	5–5	War Memorial Gymnasium (1,396); San Francisco, CA
12/18/2014*; 7:00 pm, TheW.tv	Portland State	W 77–40	6–5	War Memorial Gymnasium (1,464); San Francisco, CA
12/21/2014*; 11:00 am	at Cleveland State	L 65–69 ^{OT}	6–6	Wolstein Center (1,289); Cleveland, OH
WCC Regular Season
12/27/2014; 3:00 pm, CSNCA	at Pacific	W 77–71	7–6 (1–0)	Alex G. Spanos Center (2,340); Stockton, CA
12/29/2014; 6:00 pm, ESPNU	at Saint Mary's	L 56–69	7–7 (1–1)	McKeon Pavilion (3,126); Moraga, CA
01/01/2015; 7:00 pm, TheW.tv	San Diego	L 56–57	7–8 (1–2)	War Memorial Gymnasium (1,861); San Francisco, CA
01/03/2015; 8:00 pm, CSN BAY	BYU	L 68–99	7–9 (1–3)	War Memorial Gymnasium (2,585); San Francisco, CA
01/08/2015; 6:00 pm, RTNW/TheW.tv	at No. 6 Gonzaga	L 57–88	7–10 (1–4)	McCarthey Athletic Center (6,000); Spokane, WA
01/10/2015; 1:00 pm, CSNCA	at Portland	W 89–77	8–10 (2–4)	Chiles Center (1,422); Portland, OR
01/17/2015; 3:00 pm, CSNCA	at Santa Clara	L 64–70	8–11 (2–5)	Leavey Center (2,074); Santa Clara, CA
01/22/2015; 7:00 pm, TheW.tv	Pepperdine	W 71–59	9–11 (3–5)	War Memorial Gymnasium (1,334); San Francisco, CA
01/24/2015; 6:00 pm, TheW.tv	Loyola Marymount	L 69–70	9–12 (3–6)	War Memorial Gymnasium (2,523); San Francisco, CA
01/29/2015; 9:00 pm, ESPNU	at BYU	L 74–78	9–13 (3–7)	Marriott Center (12,452); Provo, UT
01/31/2015; 5:00 pm, TWCSN/TheW.tv	at San Diego	L 69–77	9–14 (3–8)	Jenny Craig Pavilion (2,454); San Diego, CA
02/05/2015; 6:00 pm, CSN BAY	Portland	L 57–69	9–15 (3–9)	War Memorial Gymnasium (1,386); San Francisco, CA
02/07/2015; 8:30 pm, ESPN2	No. 2 Gonzaga	L 70–81	9–16 (3–10)	War Memorial Gymnasium (4,000); San Francisco, CA
02/12/2015; 8:00 pm, ESPNU	Santa Clara	W 69–62 ^{OT}	10–16 (4–10)	War Memorial Gymnasium (2,394); San Francisco, CA
02/19/2015; 8:00 pm, TWCSN/TheW.tv	at Loyola Marymount	W 72–45	11–16 (5–10)	Gersten Pavilion (1,321); Los Angeles, CA
02/21/2015; 1:00 pm, CSNCA	at Pepperdine	W 56–54	12–16 (6–10)	Firestone Fieldhouse (1,120); Malibu, CA
02/26/2015; 8:00 pm, CSN BAY	Saint Mary's	L 53–84	12–17 (6–11)	War Memorial Gymnasium (2,081); San Francisco, CA
02/28/2015; 7:00 pm, CSN BAY	Pacific	W 65–55	13–17 (7–11)	War Memorial Gymnasium (1,545); San Francisco, CA
WCC tournament
03/06/2015; 6:00 pm, BYUtv	vs. Pacific; First round	W 62–58	14–17	Orleans Arena (7,110); Paradise, NV
03/07/2015; 6:00 pm, ESPN2	vs. No. 7 Gonzaga; Quarterfinals	L 72–81	14–18	Orleans Arena (8,537); Paradise, NV
*Non-conference game. ^{#}Rankings from AP Poll. (#) Tournament seedings in parentheses. All times are in Pacific Time.
