= 2015 West Coast Conference men's basketball tournament =

- Classification: Division I
- Season: 2014–15
- Teams: 10
- Site: Orleans Arena; Paradise, Nevada
- Champions: Gonzaga (14th title)
- Winning coach: Mark Few (12th title)
- MVP: Kyle Wiltjer (Gonzaga)
- Television: ESPN/ESPN2/BYUtv/WCC TV

2014–15 West Coast Conference men's basketball standings
| | Conf. | | | | Overall |
| Team | W | | L | PCT | W | | L | PCT |
|---|---|---|---|---|---|---|---|---|
| No. 7 Gonzaga † | 17 | – | 1 | .944 | 35 | – | 3 | .921 |
| BYU | 13 | – | 5 | .722 | 25 | – | 10 | .714 |
| Saint Mary's | 13 | – | 5 | .722 | 21 | – | 10 | .677 |
| Pepperdine | 10 | – | 8 | .556 | 18 | – | 14 | .563 |
| San Diego | 8 | – | 10 | .444 | 15 | – | 16 | .484 |
| Portland | 7 | – | 11 | .389 | 17 | – | 16 | .515 |
| Santa Clara | 7 | – | 11 | .389 | 14 | – | 18 | .438 |
| San Francisco | 7 | – | 11 | .389 | 14 | – | 18 | .438 |
| Pacific | 4 | – | 14 | .222 | 12 | – | 19 | .387 |
| Loyola Marymount | 4 | – | 14 | .222 | 8 | – | 23 | .258 |
† Conference tournament winner Rankings from AP poll

The 2015 West Coast Conference men's basketball tournament was held March 6–10, 2015 at the Orleans Arena in Paradise, Nevada. The winner of the tournament received the conference's automatic bid into the 2015 NCAA tournament.

== Seeds ==
WCC Tiebreaker procedures are as follows:

1. Head-to-head
2. Better record against a higher seed
3. Higher RPI

| Seed | School | Conference | Overall* | Tiebreaker |
|---|---|---|---|---|
| 1 | Gonzaga | 17–1 | 29–2 | |
| 2 | BYU | 13–5 | 23–8 | 1–1 vs. Gonzaga |
| 3 | Saint Mary's | 13–5 | 21–8 | 0–2 vs. Gonzaga |
| 4 | Pepperdine | 10–8 | 17–12 | |
| 5 | San Diego | 8–10 | 15–15 | |
| 6 | Portland | 7–11 | 16–14 | 2–0 vs. Santa Clara, 1–1 vs. San Francisco |
| 7 | Santa Clara | 7–11 | 13–17 | 0–2 vs. Portland, 1–1 vs. Saint Mary's |
| 8 | San Francisco | 7–11 | 13–17 | 1–1 vs. Portland, 0–2 vs. Saint Mary's |
| 9 | Pacific | 4–14 | 12–18 | 1–1 vs. Santa Clara |
| 10 | Loyola Marymount | 4–14 | 8–22 | 0–2 vs. Santa Clara |

* Overall record at end of regular season.

== Schedule ==
| Session | Game | Time* | Matchup^{#} |
First round – Friday, March 6
| 1 | 1 | 6:00 pm | #8 San Francisco vs. #9 Pacific |
| 1 | 2 | 8:00 pm | #7 Santa Clara vs. #10 Loyola Marymount |
Quarterfinals – Saturday, March 7
| 2 | 3 | 12:00 pm | #3 Saint Mary's vs. #6 Portland |
| 2 | 4 | 2:00 pm | #4 Pepperdine vs. #5 San Diego |
| 3 | 5 | 6:00 pm | #1 Gonzaga vs. #8 San Francisco |
| 3 | 6 | 8:00 pm | #2 BYU vs. #7 Santa Clara |
Semifinals – Monday, March 9
| 4 | 7 | 6:00 pm | #4 Pepperdine vs. #1 Gonzaga |
| 4 | 8 | 8:30 pm | #6 Portland vs. #2 BYU |
Championship – Tuesday, March 10
| 5 | 9 | 6:00 pm | #1 Gonzaga vs. #2 BYU |
*Game times in PT. #-Rankings denote tournament seeding.

== Bracket ==
- All non-ESPN games will be shown online on TheW.tv.

First round Friday, March 6 BYUtv
8 | San Francisco | 62
9 | Pacific | 58
7 | Santa Clara | 85
10 | Loyola Marymount | 54

Quarterfinals; Saturday, March 7 TWC SportsNet, RTNW, CSNCA, BYUtv (afternoon); ESPN2 (evening)
1 | #7 Gonzaga | 81
8 | San Francisco | 72
4 | Pepperdine | 50
5 | San Diego | 47
2 | BYU | 78
7 | Santa Clara | 76
3 | Saint Mary's | 52
6 | Portland | 69

Semifinals; Monday, March 9 ESPN (early); ESPN2 (late)
1 | #7 Gonzaga | 79
4 | Pepperdine | 61
2 | BYU | 84
6 | Portland | 70

Championship; Tuesday, March 10; ESPN; Westwood One
1 | #7 Gonzaga | 91
2 | BYU | 75

== Game summaries ==
=== San Francisco vs. Pacific ===
Series History: San Francisco leads 54–27
Broadcasters: Dave McCann and Blaine Fowler

BYUtv

Mar 6
6:00 pm PST

Recap

Pacific Tigers 58, San Francisco Dons 62
Scoring by half: 28-28, 30-34
| Pts: TJ Wallace 14; Rebs: Eric Thompson 8 Asts: TJ Wallace 4 | Pts: Kruize Pinkins & Tim Derksen 14; Rebs: Matt Glover 10; Asts: Devin Watson 6 |

Orleans Arena
Paradise, Nevada
Attendance: 7,110
Referees: Michael Reed, Kevin Brill, Michael Irving

=== Santa Clara vs. Loyola Marymount ===
Series History: Santa Clara leads 84–59
Broadcasters: Dave McCann and Blaine Fowler

BYUtv

Mar 6
8:00 pm PST

Recap

Loyola Marymount Lions 54, Santa Clara Broncos 85
Scoring by half: 22-36, 32-49
| Pts: Evan Payne 29; Rebs: Evan Payne 9 Asts: Evan Payne & Marin Mornar 2 | Pts: Brandon Clark & Jared Brownridge 19; Rebs: Jarvis Pugh 7 Asts: Jarvis Pugh 6 |

Orleans Arena
Paradise, Nevada
Attendance: 7,110
Referees: Tommy Nunez, Deron White, Michael Greenstein

=== Saint Mary's vs. Portland ===
Series History: Saint Mary's leads 60–29
Broadcasters: Dave McCann and Blaine Fowler (BYUtv)
Barry Tompkins, Casey Jacobsen, and Kelli Tennant (WCC TV)

BYUtv
WCC TV

Mar 7
12:00 pm PST

Recap

Portland Pilots 69, Saint Mary's Gaels 52
Scoring by half: 32-27, 37-26
| Pts: Kevin Bailey 16; Rebs: Volodymyr Gerun 6 Asts: Alec Wintering 4 | Pts: Brad Waldow 25; Rebs: Brad Waldow 8 Asts: Kerry Carter 2 |

Orleans Arena
Paradise, Nevada
Attendance: 8,537
Referees: Glen Mayberry, Horace Shields, Coban Lopez

=== Pepperdine vs. San Diego ===
Series History: Pepperdine leads 59–41
Broadcasters: Dave McCann and Blaine Fowler (BYUtv)
Barry Tompkins, Casey Jacobsen, and Kelli Tennant (WCC TV)

BYUtv
WCC TV

Mar 7
2:30 pm PST

Recap

San Diego Toreros 47, Pepperdine Waves 50
Scoring by half: 24-18, 23-32
| Pts: Johnny Dee & Vasa Pusica 11; Rebs: Thomas Jacobs 9 Asts: Chris Anderson 5 | Pts: Stacy Davis 19; Rebs: Stacy Davis 8 Asts: Stacy Davis & Shawn Olden 3 |

Orleans Arena
Paradise, Nevada
Attendance: 8,537
Referees: Ken Ditty, Daryl Galinas, Dennis Flannery

=== Gonzaga vs. San Francisco ===
Series History: Gonzaga leads 50–22
Broadcasters: Beth Mowins and Stan Heath

ESPN2

Mar 7
6:00 pm PST

Recap

San Francisco Dons 72, Gonzaga Bulldogs 81
Scoring by half: 29-27, 43-54
| Pts: Mark Tollefsen & Tim Derksen 21; Rebs: Tim Derksen 10; Asts: Devin Watson 3 | Pts: Przemek Karnowski 24; Rebs: Kyle Wiltjer 8 Asts: Kevin Pangos 5 |

Orleans Arena
Paradise, Nevada
Attendance: 8,537
Referees: Klaus Endrissat, Rob Rorke, Ronald Brokenbrough

=== BYU vs. Santa Clara ===
Series History: BYU leads 23–5
Broadcasters: Beth Mowins and Stan Heath

ESPN2

Mar 7
8:30 pm PST

Recap

Santa Clara Broncos 76, BYU Cougars 78
Scoring by half: 36-36, 40-42
| Pts: Jared Brownridge 29; Rebs: Nate Kratch 7 Asts: Brandon Clark 7 | Pts: Tyler Haws 30; Rebs: Tyler Haws 9 Asts: Kyle Collinsworth & Frank Bartley IV 3 |

Orleans Arena
Paradise, Nevada
Attendance: 8,537
Referees: Deldre Carr, Marc Beasley, Kurt Walker

=== Gonzaga vs. Pepperdine ===
Series History: Gonzaga leads 48–31
Broadcasters: Beth Mowins, Stan Heath, and Jeff Goodman

ESPN

Mar 9
6:00 pm PDT

Pepperdine Waves 61, Gonzaga Bulldogs 79
Scoring by half: 33-35, 28-44
| Pts: Stacy Davis 15; Rebs: Stacy Davis 7 Asts: Jeremy Major 3 | Pts: Byron Wesley 25; Rebs: Kyle Wiltjer 9 Asts: Kevin Pangos 6 |

Orleans Arena
Paradise, Nevada
Attendance: 8,546
Referees: Kevin Brill, Glen Mayberry, Deldre Carr

=== BYU vs. Portland ===
Series History: BYU leads 12–1
Broadcasters: Beth Mowins, Stan Heath, and Jeff Goodman

ESPN2

Mar 9
8:30 pm PDT

Portland Pilots 70, BYU Cougars 84
Scoring by half: 24-42, 46-42
| Pts: Thomas Van Der Mars 16; Rebs: Thomas Van Der Mars 9 Asts: Bobby Sharp 3 | Pts: Chase Fischer 24; Rebs: Kyle Collinsworth 14; Asts: Kyle Collinsworth 11; Collinsworth 6th triple double Ties NCAA career mark |

Orleans Arena
Paradise, Nevada
Attendance: 8,546

=== WCC Championship: Gonzaga vs. BYU ===
Series History: Gonzaga leads 8–4
Broadcasters: Dave Pasch, Sean Farnham, and Jeff Goodman (ESPN)
Kevin Calabro & Bill Frieder (Westwood One)

ESPN

Mar 10
6:00 pm PDT

BYU Cougars 75, Gonzaga Bulldogs 91
Scoring by half: 42-48, 33-43
| Pts: Kyle Collinsworth 28; Rebs: Corbin Kaufusi 9 Asts: Kyle Collinsworth 5 | Pts: Kyle Wiltjer 18; Rebs: Kyle Wiltjer 10; Asts: Kevin Pangos 5 |

Orleans Arena
Paradise, Nevada
Attendance: 8,585
Referees: Tommy Nunez, Mike Greenstein, Michael Irving

== See also ==
- 2014-15 NCAA Division I men's basketball season
- West Coast Conference men's basketball tournament
- 2014–15 West Coast Conference men's basketball season
- 2015 West Coast Conference women's basketball tournament
