= 2014–15 Portland Pilots men's basketball team =

American college basketball season

2014–15 Portland Pilots men's basketball
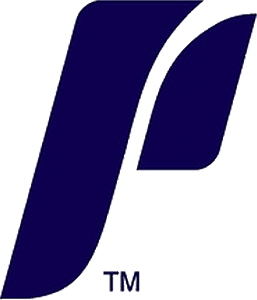

CIT, First round
- Conference: West Coast Conference
- Record: 17–16 (7–11 WCC)
- Head coach: Eric Reveno (9th season)
- Assistant coaches: Eric Jackson; Colin Pfaff; Herb Brown
- Home arena: Chiles Center

2014–15 West Coast Conference men's basketball standings
	Conf.				Overall
Team	W		L	PCT	W		L	PCT
No. 7 Gonzaga †	17	–	1	.944	35	–	3	.921
BYU	13	–	5	.722	25	–	10	.714
Saint Mary's	13	–	5	.722	21	–	10	.677
Pepperdine	10	–	8	.556	18	–	14	.563
San Diego	8	–	10	.444	15	–	16	.484
Portland	7	–	11	.389	17	–	16	.515
Santa Clara	7	–	11	.389	14	–	18	.438
San Francisco	7	–	11	.389	14	–	18	.438
Pacific	4	–	14	.222	12	–	19	.387
Loyola Marymount	4	–	14	.222	8	–	23	.258
† Conference tournament winner Rankings from AP poll

The 2014–15 Portland Pilots men's basketball team represented the University of Portland during the 2014–15 NCAA Division I men's basketball season. The Pilots, led by ninth-year head coach Eric Reveno, played their home games at the Chiles Center and were members of the West Coast Conference. They finished the season 17–16, 7–11 in WCC play to finish in a three-way tie for sixth place. They advanced to the semifinals of the WCC tournament where they lost to BYU. They were invited to the CollegeInsdier.com Tournament where they lost in the first round to Sacramento State.

== Previous season ==
The Pilots finished the season 15–16, 7–11 in WCC play to finish in a tie for sixth place. They lost in the first round of the West Coast Conference tournament to Loyola Marymount.

== Departures ==
Name	Number	Pos.	Height	Weight	Year	Hometown	Notes
Tanner Riley	3	G	6'3"	200	Senior	North Bend, WA	Graduated
John Bailey	5	F	6'8"	215	Senior	Mesa, AZ	Graduated
Korey Thieleke	21	G	6'3"	185	Senior	Bakersfield, CA	Graduated
Ryan Nicholas	32	F	6'7"	245	Senior	Spokane, WA	Graduated

== Recruitment ==
College recruiting information
Name	Hometown	School	Height	Weight	Commit date
Jason Todd; F	Mill Creek, WA	Jackson	6 ft 6 in (1.98 m)	200 lb (91 kg)	Nov 15, 2013
Jason Todd; F	Recruit ratings: Scout: Rivals: (66)				
Gabe Taylor; F	Beaverton, OR	Valley Catholic	6 ft 8 in (2.03 m)	200 lb (91 kg)	N/A
Gabe Taylor; F	Recruit ratings: Scout: Rivals: (65)				
D'Marques Tyson; G	Bothell, WA	Quality Education Academy	6 ft 5 in (1.96 m)	195 lb (88 kg)	Apr 2, 2014
D'Marques Tyson; G	Recruit ratings: Scout: Rivals: (NR)				
Philipp Hartwich; C	Cologne, Germany	Rhein Stars Koln	7 ft 0 in (2.13 m)	215 lb (98 kg)	N/A
Philipp Hartwich; C	Recruit ratings: Scout: Rivals: (NR)				
Alec Monson; G	Salt Lake City, UT	Olympus	6 ft 5 in (1.96 m)	N/A	N/A
Alec Monson; G	Recruit ratings: Scout: Rivals: (NR)				
Overall recruit ranking: Scout: nr Rivals: nr ESPN: nr
Note: In many cases, Scout, Rivals, 247Sports, On3, and ESPN may conflict in their listings of height and weight.; In these cases, the average was taken. ESPN grades are on a 100-point scale.; Sources: "Portland Pilots 2014 Basketball Commitments". Rivals.; "2014 Portland Pilots Basketball Commits". Scout.; "ESPN 2014 Portland Pilots Basketball recruits". ESPN.; "Scout.com Team Recruiting Rankings". Scout.; "2014 Team Ranking". Rivals.

=== Recruitment Class of 2015 ===
College recruiting information
Name	Hometown	School	Height	Weight	Commit date
Jazz Johnson; G	Lake Oswego, OR	Lake Oswego	5 ft 11 in (1.80 m)	170 lb (77 kg)	Jun 26, 2013
Jazz Johnson; G	Recruit ratings: Scout: Rivals: (67)				
Overall recruit ranking: Scout: nr Rivals: nr ESPN: nr
Note: In many cases, Scout, Rivals, 247Sports, On3, and ESPN may conflict in their listings of height and weight.; In these cases, the average was taken. ESPN grades are on a 100-point scale.; Sources: "Portland Pilots 2015 Basketball Commitments". Rivals.; "2015 Portland Pilots Basketball Commits". Scout.; "ESPN 2015 Portland Pilots Basketball recruits". ESPN.; "Scout.com Team Recruiting Rankings". Scout.; "2015 Team Ranking". Rivals.

== Roster ==
2014–15 Portland Pilots men's basketball team
Players
Coaches

Pos.	#	Name	Height	Weight	Year	Previous school	Hometown
G	00	Kevin Bailey	6 ft 5 in (1.96 m)	205 lb (93 kg)	Sr	East Clovis	Clovis, CA
G	1	Bryce Pressley	6 ft 4 in (1.93 m)	200 lb (91 kg)	Jr	Jesuit	Sacramento, CA
G	2	Alec Wintering	5 ft 11 in (1.8 m)	160 lb (73 kg)	So	United Faith	Concord, NC
G	5	D'Marques Tyson	6 ft 6 in (1.98 m)	200 lb (91 kg)	Fr	Quality Education Academy	Bothell, WA
G/F	10	Jason Todd	6 ft 6 in (1.98 m)	200 lb (91 kg)	Fr	Jackson HS	Mill Creek, WA
G	11	Bobby Sharp	6 ft 2 in (1.88 m)	165 lb (75 kg)	Sr	Cardinal Newman; Santa Rosa JC	Santa Rosa, CA
C	12	Thomas van der Mars	6 ft 11 in (2.11 m)	235 lb (107 kg)	Sr	Erasmus U Canarias Basketball Academy	Gouda, Netherlands
C	14	Riley Barker	6 ft 10 in (2.08 m)	240 lb (109 kg)	RS Sr	White Rock Christian Academy	Surrey, BC, Canada
C	15	Philipp Hartwich	7 ft 0 in (2.13 m)	215 lb (98 kg)	Fr	Dreikonigs Gymnasium	Cologne, Germany
G/F	20	Max Livingston	6 ft 5 in (1.96 m)	200 lb (91 kg)	Jr	Clark College; Lake Oswego	Lake Oswego, OR
F	24	Gabe Taylor	6 ft 8 in (2.03 m)	200 lb (91 kg)	Fr	Valley Catholic School	Portland, OR
G	35	David Carr	6 ft 3 in (1.91 m)	180 lb (82 kg)	Sr	Central Catholic	Portland, OR
F/C	52	Volodymyr Gerun	6 ft 10 in (2.08 m)	250 lb (113 kg)	Sr	Canarias Basketball Academy; West Virginia	Dnipropetrovsk, Ukraine
G	54	Aitor Zubizarreta	6 ft 3 in (1.91 m)	175 lb (79 kg)	So	Basque Country of Spain	Azpeitia, Gipuzkoa

Head coach

- Eric Reveno (Stanford)

Assistant coach(es)

- Eric Jackson (Green Bay)
- Colin Pfaff (Cal State Monterey Bay)
- Herb Brown (Vermont)

Legend

- (C) Team captain
- (S) Suspended
- (I) Ineligible
- (W) Walk-on
- Injured
- Current redshirt

Roster

== Schedule and results ==
Date time, TV	Opponent	Result	Record	Site (attendance) city, state
Exhibition
11/08/2014*; 7:00 pm	Concordia (CA)	W 90–81		Chiles Center (1,026); Portland, OR
Regular season
11/14/2014*; 7:00 pm	Concordia (OR)	W 87–59	1–0	Chiles Center (1,622); Portland, OR
11/16/2014*; 1:00 pm	at San Jose State	W 73–68 ^{OT}	2–0	Event Center Arena (1,453); San Jose, CA
11/22/2014*; 7:00 pm	SIU Edwardsville	W 75–53	3–0	Chiles Center (1,828); Portland, OR
11/28/2014*; 5:30 pm	vs. Murray State; Challenge in Music City	W 64–61	4–0	Nashville Municipal Auditorium (N/A); Nashville, TN
11/29/2014*; 3:00 pm	vs. Drake; Challenge in Music City	W 71–59	5–0	Nashville Municipal Auditorium (N/A); Nashville, TN
11/30/2014*; 11:00 am	vs. Valparaiso; Challenge in Music City	L 55–70	5–1	Nashville Municipal Auditorium (N/A); Nashville, TN
12/03/2014*; 7:00 pm	Portland State	W 83–71	6–1	Chiles Center (1,494); Portland, OR
12/06/2014*; 7:00 pm	Oregon State	L 58–65 ^{OT}	6–2	Chiles Center (3,413); Portland, OR
12/14/2014*; 5:00 pm	at Sacramento State	W 80–75	7–2	Colberg Court (685); Sacramento, CA
12/17/2014*; 7:30 pm	at UNLV	L 73–75 ^{OT}	7–3	Thomas & Mack Center (12,536); Paradise, NV
12/20/2014*; 7:00 pm	Montana State	W 87–60	8–3	Chiles Center (2,973); Portland, OR
12/22/2014*; 7:00 pm	Lewis & Clark	W 71–49	9–3	Chiles Center (1,273); Portland, OR
12/27/2014; 6:00 pm, TheW.tv	at San Diego	W 61–58	10–3 (1–0)	Jenny Craig Pavilion (1,442); San Diego, CA
12/29/2014; 6:00 pm, BYUtv	at BYU	L 88–97	10–4 (1–1)	Marriott Center (17,452); Provo, UT
01/03/2015; 6:30 pm, ESPN2	No. 7 Gonzaga	L 75–87	10–5 (1–2)	Chiles Center (4,852); Portland, OR
01/08/2015; 7:00 pm, TheW.tv	Santa Clara	W 78–61	11–5 (2–2)	Chiles Center (1,415); Portland, OR
01/10/2015; 1:00 pm, RTNW	San Francisco	L 77–89	11–6 (2–3)	Chiles Center (1,422); Portland, OR
01/15/2015; 7:00 pm, TheW.tv	at Loyola Marymount	L 68–80	11–7 (2–4)	Gersten Pavilion (1,659); Los Angeles, CA
01/17/2015; 5:00 pm, TWCSN/TheW.tv	at Pepperdine	L 63–67	11–8 (2–5)	Firestone Fieldhouse (1,480); Malibu, CA
01/22/2015; 7:00 pm, RTNW	Pacific	W 72–69	12–8 (3–5)	Chiles Center (1,244); Portland, OR
01/24/2015; 7:00 pm, TheW.tv	Saint Mary's	L 64–74	12–9 (3–6)	Chiles Center (2,883); Portland, OR
01/29/2015; 6:00 pm, RTNW	at No. 3 Gonzaga	L 46–64	12–10 (3–7)	McCarthey Athletic Center (6,000); Spokane, WA
02/05/2015; 6:00 pm, CSN BAY/TheW.tv	at San Francisco	W 69–57	13–10 (4–7)	War Memorial Gymnasium (1,386); San Francisco, CA
02/07/2015; 5:00 pm, TheW.tv	at Santa Clara	W 74–54	14–10 (5–7)	Leavey Center (2,110); Santa Clara, CA
02/12/2015; 7:00 pm, TheW.tv	Pepperdine	W 69–52	15–10 (6–7)	Chiles Center (2,010); Portland, OR
02/14/2015; 7:00 pm, RTNW	Loyola Marymount	W 66–63	16–10 (7–7)	Chiles Center (1,690); Portland, OR
02/19/2015; 8:00 pm, TheW.tv	at Saint Mary's	L 51–68	16–11 (7–8)	McKeon Pavilion (2,855); Moraga, CA
02/21/2015; 7:00 pm, TheW.tv	at Pacific	L 77–79 ^{OT}	16–12 (7–9)	Alex G. Spanos Center (2,653); Stockton, CA
02/26/2015; 7:00 pm, RTNW	BYU	L 69–82	16–13 (7–10)	Chiles Center (3,433); Portland, OR
02/28/2015; 1:00 pm, RTNW	San Diego	L 66–78	16–14 (7–11)	Chiles Center (2,137); Portland, OR
WCC tournament
03/07/2015; 12:00 pm, TWCSN/RTNW/BYUtv	vs. Saint Mary's; Quarterfinals	W 69–52	17–14	Orleans Arena (8,064); Paradise, NV
03/09/2015; 8:30 pm, ESPN2	vs. BYU; Semifinals	L 70–84	17–15	Orleans Arena (8,546); Paradise, NV
CIT
03/18/2015*; 7:00 pm	Sacramento State; First round	L 66–73	17–16	Chiles Center (1,013); Portland, OR
*Non-conference game. ^{#}Rankings from AP Poll. (#) Tournament seedings in parentheses. All times are in Pacific Time.

Source: Schedule

== See also ==
- 2014–15 Portland Pilots women's basketball team
