= 2014–15 Santa Clara Broncos men's basketball team =

American college basketball season

2014–15 Santa Clara Broncos men's basketball
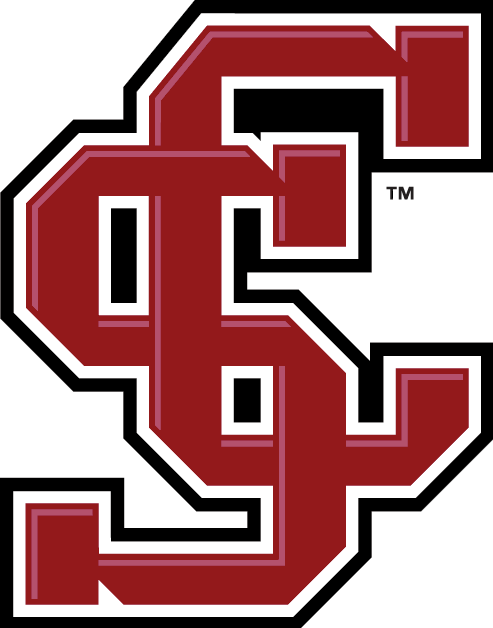
- Conference: West Coast Conference
- Record: 14–18 (7–11 WCC)
- Head coach: Kerry Keating (8th season)
- Assistant coaches: Jesse Pruitt; Sam Scholl; Kyle Schwan
- Home arena: Leavey Center

2014–15 West Coast Conference men's basketball standings
	Conf.				Overall
Team	W		L	PCT	W		L	PCT
No. 7 Gonzaga †	17	–	1	.944	35	–	3	.921
BYU	13	–	5	.722	25	–	10	.714
Saint Mary's	13	–	5	.722	21	–	10	.677
Pepperdine	10	–	8	.556	18	–	14	.563
San Diego	8	–	10	.444	15	–	16	.484
Portland	7	–	11	.389	17	–	16	.515
Santa Clara	7	–	11	.389	14	–	18	.438
San Francisco	7	–	11	.389	14	–	18	.438
Pacific	4	–	14	.222	12	–	19	.387
Loyola Marymount	4	–	14	.222	8	–	23	.258
† Conference tournament winner Rankings from AP poll

The 2014–15 Santa Clara Broncos men's basketball team represented Santa Clara University during the 2014–15 NCAA Division I men's basketball season. It was head coach Kerry Keating's eighth season at Santa Clara. The Broncos played their home games at the Leavey Center and were members of the West Coast Conference. They finished the season 14–18, 7–11 in WCC play to finish in a three way tie for sixth place. They advanced to the quarterfinals of the WCC tournament where they lost to BYU due to dq because of fans running onto the courts .

== Previous season ==
The Broncos finished the season 14–19, 6–12 in WCC play to finish in a tie for eighth place. They advanced to the quarterfinals of the WCC tournament where they lost to Gonzaga.

== Departures ==
Name	Number	Pos.	Height	Weight	Year	Hometown	Notes
Jerry Brown	0	F	6'7"	220	Senior	Richmond, CA	Graduated
Julian Clarke	22	G	6'3"	193	Junior	Toronto, ON	Transferred to Toronto
Evan Roquemore	24	G	6'3"	175	Senior	Henderson, NV	Graduated
John McArthur	25	F	6'9"	228	Senior	Danville, CA	Graduated
Robert Garrett	35	C	7'0"	270	Junior	Vallejo, CA	Left the team

== Recruiting ==
College recruiting information
Name	Hometown	School	Height	Weight	Commit date
Evan Wardlow; F	Woodland Hills, California	El Camino Real	6 ft 4 in (1.93 m)	170 lb (77 kg)	Sep 11, 2013
Evan Wardlow; F	Recruit ratings: Scout: Rivals: (67)				
Matt Hubbard; F	Colville, Washington	Colville	6 ft 9 in (2.06 m)	215 lb (98 kg)	Sep 28, 2013
Matt Hubbard; F	Recruit ratings: Scout: Rivals: (67)				
Stephen Edwards; G	Oklahoma City, Oklahoma	Putnam City West	6 ft 2 in (1.88 m)	180 lb (82 kg)	Feb 20, 2014
Stephen Edwards; G	Recruit ratings: Scout: Rivals: (NR)				
Kai Healy; G	Sydney, Australia	The Scots College	6 ft 5 in (1.96 m)	N/A	Mar 4, 2014
Kai Healy; G	Recruit ratings: Scout: Rivals: (NR)				
Overall recruit ranking: Scout: nr Rivals: nr ESPN: nr
Note: In many cases, Scout, Rivals, 247Sports, On3, and ESPN may conflict in their listings of height and weight.; In these cases, the average was taken. ESPN grades are on a 100-point scale.; Sources: "Santa Clara 2014 Basketball Commitments". Rivals.; "2014 Santa Clara Basketball Commits". Scout.; "ESPN". ESPN.; "Scout.com Team Recruiting Rankings". Scout.; "2014 Team Ranking". Rivals.

=== Recruiting Class of 2015 ===
College recruiting information
Name	Hometown	School	Height	Weight	Commit date
Matt Hauser; G	Thousand Oaks, California	Thousand Oaks	6 ft 0 in (1.83 m)	160 lb (73 kg)	May 11, 2014
Matt Hauser; G	Recruit ratings: Scout: Rivals: (66)				
Overall recruit ranking: Scout: nr Rivals: nr ESPN: nr
Note: In many cases, Scout, Rivals, 247Sports, On3, and ESPN may conflict in their listings of height and weight.; In these cases, the average was taken. ESPN grades are on a 100-point scale.; Sources: "Santa Clara 2015 Basketball Commitments". Rivals.; "2015 Santa Clara Basketball Commits". Scout.; "ESPN". ESPN.; "Scout.com Team Recruiting Rankings". Scout.; "2015 Team Ranking". Rivals.

== Roster ==
2014–15 Santa Clara Broncos men's basketball team
Players
Coaches

Pos.	#	Name	Height	Weight	Year	Previous school	Hometown
G	0	Stephen Edwards	6 ft 2 in (1.88 m)	180 lb (82 kg)	Fr	Putnam West	Muskogee, OK
F	1	Evan Wardlow	6 ft 4 in (1.93 m)	180 lb (82 kg)	Fr	El Camino Real	Lake View Terrace, CA
G	3	Brandon Clark	6 ft 0 in (1.83 m)	170 lb (77 kg)	Sr	Merrillville	East Chicago, IN
G	4	Jarvis Pugh	6 ft 6 in (1.98 m)	190 lb (86 kg)	RS Fr	Plano East	Murphy, TX
G	5	Jalen Richard	6 ft 3 in (1.91 m)	180 lb (82 kg)	So	Poston Butte	San Tan Valley, AZ
G	10	Kai Healy	6 ft 5 in (1.96 m)	210 lb (95 kg)	Fr	The Scots College in Bellevue Hills	Wahroonga, Sydney, Australia
G	20	Denzel Johnson	6 ft 3 in (1.91 m)	189 lb (86 kg)	Sr	Clovis West	Fresno, CA
F	22	Matt Hubbard	6 ft 9 in (2.06 m)	210 lb (95 kg)	Fr	Colville	Colville, WA,
G	23	Jared Brownridge	6 ft 2 in (1.88 m)	195 lb (88 kg)	So	Waubonsie Valley	Aurora, IL
F	30	Andrew Papenfus	6 ft 5 in (1.96 m)	215 lb (98 kg)	Sr	Aspen	Snowmass, CO
C	35	Robert Garrett	7 ft 0 in (2.13 m)	270 lb (122 kg)	Sr	Sacramento	Vallejo, CA
F	43	Nate Kratch	6 ft 6 in (1.98 m)	213 lb (97 kg)	RS So	Watertown-Mayer	Watertown, MN
F	44	Yannick Atanga	6 ft 8 in (2.03 m)	220 lb (100 kg)	Sr	Besant Hill of Happy Valley (Ojai, CA)	Yaoundé, Cameroon
C	50	Emmanuel Ndumanya	6 ft 10 in (2.08 m)	260 lb (118 kg)	RS Fr	Junípero Serra	Anambra, Nigeria

Head coach

- Kerry Keating (Seton Hall)

Assistant coach(es)

- Jesse Pruitt (UC Davis)
- Sam Scholl (San Diego)
- Kyle Schwan (Northern State)

Legend

- (C) Team captain
- (S) Suspended
- (I) Ineligible
- (W) Walk-on
- Injured
- Current redshirt

Roster
Last update: 2014-08-05

== Schedule and results ==
Date time, TV	Opponent	Result	Record	Site (attendance) city, state
Exhibition
11/07/2014*; 5:00 pm	Cal State East Bay	W 82–72		Leavey Center (1,512); Santa Clara, CA
Regular season
11/14/2014*; 7:00 pm	Cal State Fullerton	W 89–72	1–0	Leavey Center (1,226); Santa Clara, CA
11/15/2014*; 7:00 pm	San Diego Christian	W 70–58	2–0	Leavey Center (1,203); Santa Clara, CA
11/19/2014*; 5:00 pm, RTNW	at Utah State	L 54–60	2–1	Smith Spectrum (9,334); Logan, UT
11/24/2014*; 4:00 pm, BTN	at No. 20 Michigan State; Orlando Classic opening round	L 52–79	2–2	Breslin Student Events Center (14,797); East Lansing, MI
11/27/2014*; 9:00 am, ESPN2	vs. Tennessee; Orlando Classic quarterfinals	L 57–64	2–3	HP Field House (3,915); Orlando, FL
11/28/2014*; 11:30 am, ESPNU	vs. Rhode Island; Orlando Classic consolation round	L 44–66	2–4	HP Field House (4,383); Orlando, FL
11/30/2014*; 7:30 am, ESPN3	vs. Rider; Orlando Classic 7th place game	W 68–60	3–4	HP Field House (4,842); Orlando, FL
12/06/2014*; 7:00 pm	at San Jose State	W 61–50	4–4	Event Center Arena (2,123); San Jose, CA
12/13/2014*; 7:00 pm	Washington State	W 76–67	5–4	Leavey Center (1,172); Santa Clara, CA
12/20/2014*; 2:00 pm	Northeastern; Cable Car Classic	L 72–78	5–5	Leavey Center (1,168); Santa Clara, CA
12/23/2014*; 2:00 pm	Cal Poly; Cable Car Classic	L 58–69	5–6	Leavey Center (1,107); Santa Clara, CA
12/27/2014; 1:00 pm, CSNCA	at Saint Mary's	L 60–73	5–7 (0–1)	McKeon Pavilion (3,256); Moraga, CA
12/29/2014; 7:00 pm, TheW.tv	at Pacific	W 57–40	6–7 (1–1)	Alex G. Spanos Center (2,007); Stockton, CA
01/01/2015; 2:00 pm, BYUtv	BYU	L 46–81	6–8 (1–2)	Leavey Center (2,375); Santa Clara, CA
01/03/2015; 7:00 pm, TheW.tv	San Diego	W 59–56	7–8 (2–2)	Leavey Center (1,331); Santa Clara, CA
01/08/2015; 7:00 pm, TheW.tv	at Portland	L 61–78	7–9 (2–3)	Chiles Center (1,415); Portland, OR
01/10/2015; 5:00 pm, RTNW/TheW.tv	at No. 6 Gonzaga	L 57–79	7–10 (2–4)	McCarthey Athletic Center (6,000); Spokane, WA
01/13/2015*; 7:00 pm	Saint Katherine	W 77–63	8–10	Leavey Center (1,117); Santa Clara, CA
01/17/2015; 3:00 pm, CSNCA	San Francisco	W 70–64	9–10 (3–4)	Leavey Center (2,074); Santa Clara, CA
01/22/2015; 8:00 pm, CSNCA	Loyola Marymount	W 65–62	10–10 (4–4)	Leavey Center (1,318); Santa Clara, CA
01/24/2015; 8:00 pm, CSNCA	Pepperdine	W 60–57	11–10 (5–4)	Leavey Center (1,760); Santa Clara, CA
01/29/2015; 7:00 pm, TheW.tv	at San Diego	L 64–69	11–11 (5–5)	Jenny Craig Pavilion (2,369); San Diego, CA
01/31/2015; 6:30 pm, BYUtv	at BYU	L 57–78	11–12 (5–6)	Marriott Center (17,771); Provo, UT
02/05/2015; 8:00 pm, ESPN2	No. 2 Gonzaga	L 63–77	11–13 (5–7)	Leavey Center (4,700); Santa Clara, CA
02/07/2015; 7:00 pm, TheW.tv	Portland	L 54–74	11–14 (5–8)	Leavey Center (2,110); Santa Clara, CA
02/12/2015; 8:00 pm, ESPNU	at San Francisco	L 62–69 ^{OT}	11–15 (5–9)	War Memorial Gymnasium (2,394); San Francisco, CA
02/19/2015; 6:00 pm, TheW.tv	at Pepperdine	L 55–64	11–16 (5–10)	Firestone Fieldhouse (1,055); Malibu, CA
02/21/2015; 3:00 pm, TheW.tv	at Loyola Marymount	W 70–63	12–16 (6–10)	Gersten Pavilion (1,844); Los Angeles, CA
02/26/2015; 7:00 pm, TheW.tv	Pacific	L 57–64	12–17 (6–11)	Leavey Center (1,110); Santa Clara, CA
02/28/2015; 5:00 pm, CSN BAY	Saint Mary's	W 71–70	13–17 (7–11)	Leavey Center (2,750); Santa Clara, CA
WCC tournament
03/06/2015; 8:00 pm, BYUtv	vs. Loyola Marymount; First round	W 85–54	14–17	Orleans Arena (7,110); Paradise, NV
03/07/2015; 8:00 pm, ESPN2	vs. BYU; Quarterfinals	L 76–78	14–18	Orleans Arena (8,537); Paradise, NV
*Non-conference game. ^{#}Rankings from AP Poll. (#) Tournament seedings in parentheses. All times are in Pacific Time.
