= 2014–15 Pepperdine Waves men's basketball team =

American college basketball season

2014–15 Pepperdine Waves men's basketball
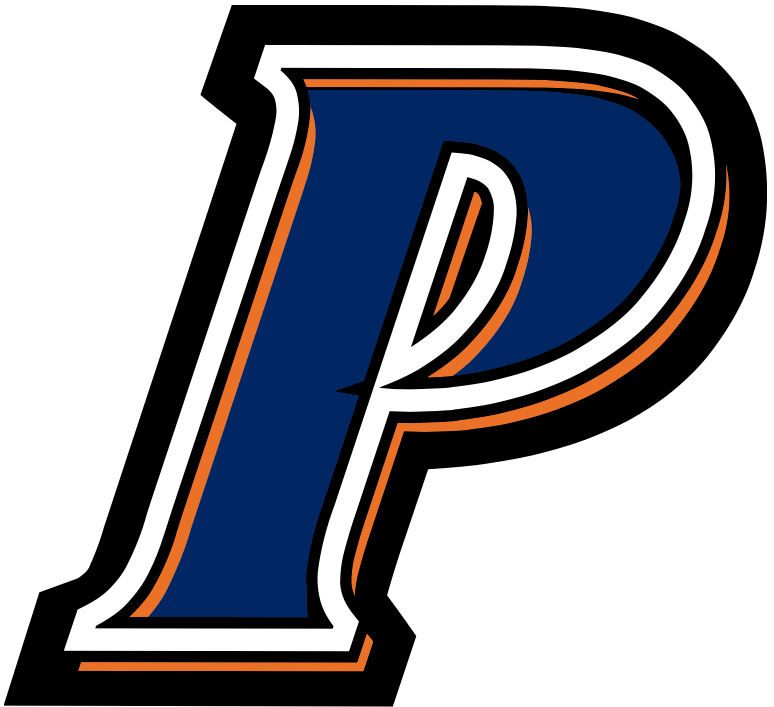

CBI, first round
- Conference: West Coast Conference
- Record: 18–14 (10–8 WCC)
- Head coach: Marty Wilson (4th season)
- Assistant coaches: Mark Amaral; Bryant Moore; John Impelman
- Home arena: Firestone Fieldhouse

2014–15 West Coast Conference men's basketball standings
	Conf.				Overall
Team	W		L	PCT	W		L	PCT
No. 7 Gonzaga †	17	–	1	.944	35	–	3	.921
BYU	13	–	5	.722	25	–	10	.714
Saint Mary's	13	–	5	.722	21	–	10	.677
Pepperdine	10	–	8	.556	18	–	14	.563
San Diego	8	–	10	.444	15	–	16	.484
Portland	7	–	11	.389	17	–	16	.515
Santa Clara	7	–	11	.389	14	–	18	.438
San Francisco	7	–	11	.389	14	–	18	.438
Pacific	4	–	14	.222	12	–	19	.387
Loyola Marymount	4	–	14	.222	8	–	23	.258
† Conference tournament winner Rankings from AP poll

The 2014–15 Pepperdine Waves men's basketball team represented Pepperdine University during the 2014–15 NCAA Division I men's basketball season. It was head coach Marty Wilson's fourth full season at Pepperdine and fifth including his time as interim head coach. The Waves played their home games at the Firestone Fieldhouse and were members of the West Coast Conference (WCC). They finished the season 18–14, 10–8 in WCC play, to finish in fourth place. They advanced to the quarterfinals of the WCC tournament where they lost to Gonzaga. They were invited to the College Basketball Invitational where they lost in the first round to Seattle.

== Previous season ==
The Waves finished the season 15–16, 8–10 in WCC play, to finish in fifth place. They lost in the quarterfinals of the WCC tournament to Saint Mary's.

== Departures ==
Name	Number	Pos.	Height	Weight	Year	Hometown	Notes
Allen Stevens	2	G	5'10"	150	Junior	Moorpark, CA	Left the team due to focus on studies
Jeff Van Dyke	10	G	6'2"	180	Freshman	Carlsbad, CA	Transferred
Austin Mills	13	G	6'0"	170	Sophomore	Beverly Hills, CA	Walk-on; did not return
Malcolm Brooks	15	G	6'4"	190	Junior	Brooklyn, NY	Transferred to Cal State Fullerton
Brendan Lane	21	F	6'9"	223	RS Senior	Rocklin, CA	Graduated
Nikolas Skouen	31	G	6'4"	190	Senior	Bergen, Norway	Graduated
Malte Kramer	44	F	6'6"	215	Senior	San Luis Obispo, CA	Graduated

=== Incoming transfers ===
Name	Number	Pos.	Height	Weight	Year	Hometown	Previous school
A. J. Lapray	20	G	6'5"	187	Sophomore	Salem, OR	Transferred from Oregon. Under NCAA transfer rules, Lapray will have to redshirt for the 2014–15 season. Will have three years of remaining eligibility.

== Recruiting class of 2014 ==
College recruiting information
Name	Hometown	School	Height	Weight	Commit date
Nate Gehring; C	Waukee, Iowa	Waukee	6 ft 10 in (2.08 m)	220 lb (100 kg)	Sep 16, 2013
Nate Gehring; C	Recruit ratings: Scout: Rivals: (68)				
A.J. John; F	Santa Rosa, California	Maria Carrillo	6 ft 7 in (2.01 m)	210 lb (95 kg)	Oct 29, 2013
A.J. John; F	Recruit ratings: Scout: Rivals: (66)				
Ryan Keenan; C	Woodbury, Minnesota	East Ridge	6 ft 10 in (2.08 m)	N/A	Nov 2, 2013
Ryan Keenan; C	Recruit ratings: Scout: Rivals: (NR)				
Shawn Olden; G	Tulsa, Oklahoma	Union City	6 ft 4 in (1.93 m)	N/A	Apr 14, 2014
Shawn Olden; G	Recruit ratings: Scout: Rivals: (NR)				
Overall recruit ranking: Scout: nr Rivals: nr ESPN: nr
Note: In many cases, Scout, Rivals, 247Sports, On3, and ESPN may conflict in their listings of height and weight.; In these cases, the average was taken. ESPN grades are on a 100-point scale.; Sources: "Pepperdine Waves 2014 Basketball Commitments". Rivals.; "2014 Pepperdine Waves Basketball Commits". Scout.; "ESPN 2014 Pepperdine Waves Basketball recruits". ESPN.; "Scout.com Team Recruiting Rankings". Scout.; "2014 Team Ranking". Rivals.

=== Recruiting class of 2015 ===
College recruiting information
Name	Hometown	School	Height	Weight	Commit date
Kameron Edwards; F	Fontana, CA	Etiwanda High School	6 ft 6 in (1.98 m)	210 lb (95 kg)	Sep 13, 2014
Kameron Edwards; F	Recruit ratings: Scout: Rivals: (68)				
Overall recruit ranking: Scout: nr Rivals: nr ESPN: nr
Note: In many cases, Scout, Rivals, 247Sports, On3, and ESPN may conflict in their listings of height and weight.; In these cases, the average was taken. ESPN grades are on a 100-point scale.; Sources: "Pepperdine Waves 2015 Basketball Commitments". Rivals.; "2015 Pepperdine Waves Basketball Commits". Scout.; "ESPN 2015 Pepperdine Waves Basketball recruits". ESPN.; "Scout.com Team Recruiting Rankings". Scout.; "2015 Team Ranking". Rivals.

== Roster ==
2014–15 Pepperdine Waves men's basketball team
Players
Coaches

Pos.	#	Name	Height	Weight	Year	Previous school	Hometown
G	0	Amadi Udenyi	6 ft 0 in (1.83 m)	195 lb (88 kg)	So	De La Salle HS; St. Thomas More	Oakland, CA
G	1	Marley Biyendolo	6 ft 3 in (1.91 m)	180 lb (82 kg)	RS Fr	Cheltenham Secondary College; Andrew Bogut Academy	Dingley Village, Australia
G	3	Jeremy Major	5 ft 10 in (1.78 m)	165 lb (75 kg)	So	Maranatha	Pasadena, CA
F	5	Stacy Davis	6 ft 6 in (1.98 m)	245 lb (111 kg)	Jr	Laveen Betty Fairfax	Laveen, AZ
G	11	Atif Russell	6 ft 5 in (1.96 m)	210 lb (95 kg)	Jr	Seven Lakes	Katy, TX
F	12	David Jesperson	6 ft 8 in (2.03 m)	210 lb (95 kg)	So	Merrill	Merrill, WI
G	20	A. J. Lapray (redshirt)	6 ft 5 in (1.96 m)	190 lb (86 kg)	So	Sprague HS; Oregon	Salem, OR
G	21	Shawn Olden	6 ft 3 in (1.91 m)	175 lb (79 kg)	Fr	Union HS	Tulsa, OK
C	22	Nate Gehring	6 ft 10 in (2.08 m)	225 lb (102 kg)	Fr	Waukee HS	Waukee, IA
G	23	Jonathan Allen	6 ft 2 in (1.88 m)	185 lb (84 kg)	So	Ravenwood HS	Nashville, TN
F	25	A. J. John	6 ft 8 in (2.03 m)	215 lb (98 kg)	Fr	Maria Carrillo HS	Santa Rosa, CA
G/F	30	Lamond Murray Jr.	6 ft 5 in (1.96 m)	200 lb (91 kg)	So	Bishop Montgomery	Torrance, CA
F	34	Jake Johnson	6 ft 10 in (2.08 m)	220 lb (100 kg)	Jr	Reno HS; Casper College	Reno, NV
C	44	Ryan Kennan	6 ft 10 in (2.08 m)	240 lb (109 kg)	Fr	East Ridge HS	Woodbury, MN
F	45	Jett Raines	6 ft 7 in (2.01 m)	215 lb (98 kg)	Jr	Coppell	Coppell, TX

Head coach

- Marty Wilson (Pepperdine)

Assistant coach(es)

- Marak Amaral (College of Idaho)
- Bryant Moore (Texas Tech)
- John Impelman (Occidental)

Legend

- (C) Team captain
- (S) Suspended
- (I) Ineligible
- (W) Walk-on
- Injured
- Current redshirt

Roster
Last update: August 11, 2024

== Schedule and results ==
Date time, TV	Opponent	Result	Record	Site (attendance) city, state
Regular season
November 14, 2014*; 7:00 p.m.	Fresno State	W 89–74	1–0	Firestone Fieldhouse (2,003); Malibu, CA
November 17, 2014*; 7:00 p.m.	Cal Lutheran	W 76–61	2–0	Firestone Fieldhouse (1,412); Malibu, CA
November 19, 2014*; 7:00 p.m.	at San Jose State	W 63–44	3–0	Event Center Arena (1,358); San Jose, CA
November 24, 2014*; 5:00 p.m., ESPN3	at Iowa	L 61–72	3–1	Carver–Hawkeye Arena (12,979); Iowa City, IA
December 4, 2014*; 7:00 p.m.	Cal State Northridge	W 66–56	4–1	Firestone Fieldhouse (1,511); Malibu, CA
December 6, 2014*; 6:00 p.m.	at Cal State Fullerton	W 74–62	5–1	Titan Gym (1,314); Fullerton, CA
December 13, 2014*; 11:00 a.m., P12N	at Arizona State	L 74–81	5–2	Wells Fargo Arena (4,575); Tempe, AZ
December 15, 2014*; 7:00 p.m.	South Alabama; Gotham Classic	W 78–68	6–2	Firestone Fieldhouse (785); Malibu, CA
December 17, 2014*; 7:00 p.m.	Howard; Gotham Classic	W 53–45	7–2	Firestone Fieldhouse (885); Malibu, CA
December 20, 2014*; 4:00 p.m., ESPN3	vs. Richmond; Gotham Classic	L 63–65	7–3	Madison Square Garden (8,088); New York City, NY
December 27, 2014*; 1:00 p.m.	IUPUI; Gotham Classic	L 53–55	7–4	Firestone Fieldhouse (903); Malibu, CA
December 29, 2014; 6:00 p.m., TWCSN	at Loyola Marymount	W 69–56	8–4 (1–0)	Gersten Pavilion (1,691); Los Angeles, CA
January 1, 2015; 5:00 p.m., TheW.tv	Saint Mary's	L 59–68	8–5 (1–1)	Firestone Fieldhouse (1,030); Malibu, CA
January 3, 2015; 5:00 p.m., TheW.tv	Pacific	W 71–61	9–5 (2–1)	Firestone Fieldhouse (905); Malibu, CA
January 8, 2015; 8:00 p.m., ESPNU	at BYU	W 67–61	10–5 (3–1)	Marriott Center (15,852); Provo, UT
January 10, 2015; 3:00 p.m., TWCSN	at San Diego	W 59–47	11–5 (4–1)	Jenny Craig Pavilion (1,378); San Diego, CA
January 15, 2015; 7:30 p.m., TWCSN	No. 3 Gonzaga	L 76–78	11–6 (4–2)	Firestone Fieldhouse (3,250); Malibu, CA
January 17, 2015; 5:00 p.m., TWCSN	Portland	W 67–62	12–6 (5–2)	Firestone Fieldhouse (1,480); Malibu, CA
January 22, 2015; 7:00 p.m., TheW.tv	at San Francisco	L 59–71	12–7 (5–3)	War Memorial Gymnasium (1,334); San Francisco, CA
January 22, 2015; 7:00 p.m., TheW.tv	at Santa Clara	L 57–60	12–8 (5–4)	Leavey Center (1,760); Santa Clara, CA
January 29, 2015; 7:00 p.m., TheW.tv	at Pacific	W 50–43	13–8 (6–4)	Alex G. Spanos Center (2,396); Stockton, CA
January 31, 2015; 3:00 p.m., CSN BAY	at Saint Mary's	W 67–62	14–8 (7–4)	McKeon Pavilion (3,381); Moraga, CA
February 5, 2015; 8:00 p.m., TWCSN	BYU	W 80–74	15–8 (8–4)	Firestone Fieldhouse (2,630); Malibu, CA
February 7, 2015; 1:00 p.m., TWCSN	San Diego	L 50–72	15–9 (8–5)	Firestone Fieldhouse (1,355); Malibu, CA
February 12, 2015; 7:00 p.m., TheW.tv	at Portland	L 52–69	15–10 (8–6)	Chiles Center (2,010); Portland, OR
February 14, 2015; 5:00 p.m., RTNW/TheW.tv	at No. 3 Gonzaga	L 48–56	15–11 (8–7)	McCarthey Athletic Center (6,000); Spokane, WA
February 19, 2015; 6:00 p.m., TheW.tv	Santa Clara	W 64–55	16–11 (9–7)	Firestone Fieldhouse (1,055); Malibu, CA
February 21, 2015; 6:00 p.m., TheW.tv	San Francisco	L 54–56	16–12 (9–8)	Firestone Fieldhouse (1,120); Malibu, CA
February 28, 2015; 3:00 p.m., TWCSN	Loyola Marymount	W 65–49	17–12 (10–8)	Firestone Fieldhouse (1,451); Malibu, CA
WCC tournament
March 7, 2015; 2:00 p.m., TWCSN/BYUtv/RTNW	vs. San Diego; Quarterfinals	W 50–47	18–12	Orleans Arena (8,064); Paradise, NV
March 9, 2015; 6:00 p.m., ESPN	vs. No. 7 Gonzaga; Semifinals	L 61–79	18–13	Orleans Arena (8,546); Paradise, NV
College Basketball Invitational
March 18, 2015*; 7:00 p.m.	at Seattle; First round	L 45–62	18–14	Connolly Center (999); Seattle, WA
*Non-conference game. ^{#}Rankings from AP poll. (#) Tournament seedings in parentheses. All times are in Pacific.
