= 2014–15 Loyola Marymount Lions men's basketball team =

American college basketball season

2014–15 Loyola Marymount Lions men's basketball
- Conference: West Coast Conference
- Record: 8–23 (4–14 WCC)
- Head coach: Mike Dunlap (1st season)
- Assistant coaches: John Peterson Jr. (1st season); Patrick Sandle (1st season); Ray Johnson (1st season)
- Home arena: Gersten Pavilion

2014–15 West Coast Conference men's basketball standings
	Conf.				Overall
Team	W		L	PCT	W		L	PCT
No. 7 Gonzaga †	17	–	1	.944	35	–	3	.921
BYU	13	–	5	.722	25	–	10	.714
Saint Mary's	13	–	5	.722	21	–	10	.677
Pepperdine	10	–	8	.556	18	–	14	.563
San Diego	8	–	10	.444	15	–	16	.484
Portland	7	–	11	.389	17	–	16	.515
Santa Clara	7	–	11	.389	14	–	18	.438
San Francisco	7	–	11	.389	14	–	18	.438
Pacific	4	–	14	.222	12	–	19	.387
Loyola Marymount	4	–	14	.222	8	–	23	.258
† Conference tournament winner Rankings from AP poll

The 2014–15 Loyola Marymount Lions men's basketball team represented Loyola Marymount University during the 2014–15 NCAA Division I men's basketball season. The Lions were coached by new head coach Mike Dunlap. The Lions competed in the West Coast Conference and played their home games at Gersten Pavilion. They finished the season 8–23, 4–14 in WCC play to finish in a tie for ninth place. They lost in the first round of the WCC tournament to Santa Clara.

== Before the season ==
=== Departures ===
Name	Number	Pos.	Height	Weight	Year	Hometown	Notes
C.J. Blackwell	2	F	6'5"	240	RS Sophomore	Los Angeles, CA	Transferred to Kentucky Wesleyan College
Anthony Ireland	3	G	5'10"	170	Senior	Waterbury, CT	Graduated
Nino Jackson	4	G	6'2"	170	RS Freshman	Ardmore, OK	Transferred to Indian Hills Community College
Ben Dickinson	10	F	6'9"	223	RS Sophomore	Alexandria, VA	Transferred to UNC Greensboro
Nick Stover	11	F	6'6"	200	Sophomore	Los Angeles, CA	Transferred to South Alabama
Alex Osborne	15	F	6'7"	240	RS Senior	Los Angeles, CA	Graduated
Max Heller	21	G	5'9"	170	RS Sophomore	San Diego, CA	Transferred
Gabe Levin	32	F	6'7"	230	Freshman	Oak Park, IL	Transferred to Marquette

=== Recruits ===
Name	Pos.	Height	Weight	High School/Last College	Hometown	Notes
Devin Wyatt	F	6'7"	195	De Soto	De Soto, TX	Incoming Freshman who played on #22 De Soto team in 2013
David Humphries	G	6'4"	200	Northern Iowa Area C.C.	Adelaide, Australia	First ever NIACC 2-time All American, transfers as a Junior
Simon Krajcovic	G	6'3"	185	Canarias Basketball Academy- Spain	Slovakia	Member of the Slovak National team since he was 16, averaging 17.5 points, 4.6 rebounds, 3.4 assists, 3.8 steals, and 31 minutes. Led Canarias to F4 Championship in 2014.
Matt Hayes	G	6'1"	170	Santa Rosa J.C.	Elk Grove, California	Led Santa Rosa to first ever CCCAA Championship. Was named a member of the All-Tournament team as well as First Team-All State and First Team- Big 8. Transfers as a sophomore.
Petr Herman	F	6'10"	240	Canarias Basketball Academy- Spain	Central Bohemian Region, Czech Republic	Member of the Czech Republic national team since 2010
Joshua Spiers	F	6'7"	205	Towsnville Heat	Queensland, Australia	Member of the Australian U20 National Championships, helped Queensland to silver medal
Steven Haney	F	6'6"	190	UCF	Fort Lauderdale, Florida	Transfer from UCF as a sophomore, will redshirt this season

== Roster ==
2014–15 Loyola Marymount Lions men's basketball team
Players
Coaches

Pos.	#	Name	Height	Weight	Year	Previous school	Hometown
G	1	Evan Payne	6 ft 1 in (1.85 m)	195 lb (88 kg)	So	Kingdom Christian Academy	Cuyahoga Falls, OH
F	2	Joshua Spiers	6 ft 7 in (2.01 m)	205 lb (93 kg)	Fr	Townsville Heat	Queensland, Australia
G	5	Simon Krajcovic	6 ft 3 in (1.91 m)	185 lb (84 kg)	Fr	Canarias Academy	Považská Bystrica, Slovakia
G	10	Matt Hayes	6 ft 1 in (1.85 m)	170 lb (77 kg)	So	Santa Rosa JC	Elk Grove, CA
F	12	Steven Haney	6 ft 5 in (1.96 m)	195 lb (88 kg)	So	UCF	Fort Lauderdale, FL
F	14	Patson Siame	6 ft 11 in (2.11 m)	225 lb (102 kg)	So	Findlay College Prep	Zambia, Africa
F	20	Devin Wyatt	6 ft 7 in (2.01 m)	195 lb (88 kg)	Fr	DeSoto	DeSoto, TX
F	22	Godwin Okonji	6 ft 8 in (2.03 m)	220 lb (100 kg)	RS Sr	Findlay College Prep	Lagos, Nigeria
G	23	Chase Flint	6 ft 1 in (1.85 m)	180 lb (82 kg)	Sr	Eastern Utah	Kaysville, UT
G	24	Ayodeji Egbeyemi	6 ft 4 in (1.93 m)	210 lb (95 kg)	RS Sr	National Christian Academy	Fort Washington, MD
F	33	Petr Herman	6 ft 10 in (2.08 m)	240 lb (109 kg)	Fr	Canarias Academy	Central Bohemian Region, Czech Republic
F	42	Marin Mornar	6 ft 9 in (2.06 m)	205 lb (93 kg)	Jr	Consortium College Prep (Detroit)	Zagreb, Croatia
G	45	David Humphries	6 ft 4 in (1.93 m)	210 lb (95 kg)	Jr	Northern Iowa Area CC	Adelaide, Australia

Head coach

- Mike Dunlap (Loyola Marymount)

Assistant coach(es)

- John Peterson Jr. (San Francisco)
- Patrick Sandle (San Francisco State)
- Ray Johnson (California)

Legend

- (C) Team captain
- (S) Suspended
- (I) Ineligible
- (W) Walk-on
- Injured
- Current redshirt

== Schedule and results ==
Date time, TV	Opponent	Result	Record	Site (attendance) city, state
Regular season
11/14/2014*; 6:00 pm	Southeast Missouri State; LMU Tournament	W 76–66	1–0	Gersten Pavilion (1,703); Los Angeles, CA
11/15/2014*; 5:00 pm	Boise State; LMU Tournament	L 69–77	1–1	Gersten Pavilion (1,326); Los Angeles, CA
11/20/2014*; 6:00 pm, P12N	at Arizona State	L 44–68	1–2	Wells Fargo Arena (3,923); Tempe, AZ
11/23/2014*; 5:00 pm	San Diego Christian	W 82–60	2–2	Gersten Pavilion (1,219); Los Angeles, CA
11/26/2014*; 5:00 pm	UC Riverside	W 66–62	3–2	Gersten Pavilion (1,625); Los Angeles, CA
11/29/2014*; 8:00 pm	UC Irvine	L 72–80	3–3	Gersten Pavilion (1,568); Los Angeles, CA
12/03/2014*; 7:00 pm, P12N	at USC	L 61–77	3–4	Galen Center (2,537); Los Angeles, CA
12/13/2014*; 1:00 pm	at Northern Arizona	L 69–71	3–5	Walkup Skydome (803); Flagstaff, AZ
12/17/2014*; 6:00 pm, P12N	at Stanford	L 58–67	3–6	Maples Pavilion (4,088); Stanford, CA
12/22/2014*; 8:00 pm, ESPNU	vs. No. 11 Wichita State; Diamond Head Classic	L 53–80	3–7	Stan Sheriff Center (8,448); Honolulu, HI
12/23/2014*; 10:30 pm, ESPNU	vs. Nebraska; Diamond Head Classic consolation round	L 42–50 ^{OT}	3–8	Stan Sheriff Center (7,140); Honolulu, HI
12/25/2014*; 10:30 am, ESPN3	vs. DePaul; Diamond Head Classic seventh place game	W 72–69	4–8	Stan Sheriff Center (5,125); Honolulu, HI
12/29/2014; 6:00 pm, TWCSN	Pepperdine	L 56–69	4–9 (0–1)	Gersten Pavilion (1,691); Los Angeles, CA
01/01/2015; 1:00 pm, TheW.tv	Pacific	L 63–77	4–10 (0–2)	Gersten Pavilion (1,061); Los Angeles, CA
01/03/2015; 1:00 pm, TWCSN	Saint Mary's	L 63–72	4–11 (0–3)	Gersten Pavilion (1,109); Los Angeles, CA
01/08/2015; 8:00 pm, TWCSN	at San Diego	L 50–59	4–12 (0–4)	Jenny Craig Pavilion (1,343); San Diego, CA
01/10/2015; 6:00 pm, BYUtv	at BYU	L 72–85	4–13 (0–5)	Marriott Center (16,912); Provo, UT
01/15/2015; 7:00 pm, TheW.tv	Portland	W 80–68	5–13 (1–5)	Gersten Pavilion (1,659); Los Angeles, CA
01/17/2015; 1:00 pm, TWCSN	No. 3 Gonzaga	L 55–72	5–14 (1–6)	Gersten Pavilion (4,026); Los Angeles, CA
01/22/2015; 8:00 pm, CSNCA	at Santa Clara	L 62–65	5–15 (1–7)	Leavey Center (1,318); Santa Clara, CA
01/24/2015; 6:00 pm, TheW.tv	at San Francisco	W 70–69	6–15 (2–7)	War Memorial Gymnasium (2,523); San Francisco, CA
01/29/2015; 7:30 pm, CSNCA	at Saint Mary's	L 54–68	6–16 (2–8)	McKeon Pavilion (2,971); Moraga, CA
01/31/2015; 1:00 pm, TWCSN	at Pacific	W 76–71 ^{OT}	7–16 (3–8)	Alex G. Spanos Center (2,446); Stockton, CA
02/05/2015; 7:00 pm, TheW.tv	San Diego	W 70–61	8–16 (4–8)	Gersten Pavilion (1,872); Los Angeles, CA
02/07/2015; 1:00 pm, TWCSN	BYU	L 68–87	8–17 (4–9)	Gersten Pavilion (3,232); Los Angeles, CA
02/12/2014; 6:00 pm, RTNW/TheW.tv	at No. 3 Gonzaga	L 51–80	8–18 (4–10)	McCarthey Athletic Center (6,000); Spokane, WA
02/14/2015; 7:00 pm, RTNW/TheW.tv	at Portland	L 63–66	8–19 (4–11)	Chiles Center (1,690); Portland, OR
02/19/2015; 8:00 pm, TWCSN	San Francisco	L 45–72	8–20 (4–12)	Gersten Pavilion (1,321); Los Angeles, CA
02/21/2015; 3:00 pm, TheW.tv	Santa Clara	L 63–70	8–21 (4–13)	Gersten Pavilion (1,844); Los Angeles, CA
02/28/2015; 3:00 pm, TWCSN	at Pepperdine	L 49–65	8–22 (4–14)	Firestone Fieldhouse (1,451); Malibu, CA
WCC tournament
03/06/2015; 8:00 pm, BYUtv	vs. Santa Clara; First round	L 54–85	8–23	Orleans Arena (7,110); Paradise, NV
*Non-conference game. ^{#}Rankings from AP Poll. (#) Tournament seedings in parentheses.
