= 2014–15 San Diego Toreros men's basketball team =

American college basketball season

2014–15 San Diego Toreros men's basketball
- Conference: West Coast Conference
- Record: 15–16 (8–10 WCC)
- Head coach: Bill Grier (8th season)
- Assistant coaches: Mike Burns; Rodney Tention; Kyle Bankhead
- Home arena: Jenny Craig Pavilion

2014–15 West Coast Conference men's basketball standings
	Conf.				Overall
Team	W		L	PCT	W		L	PCT
No. 7 Gonzaga †	17	–	1	.944	35	–	3	.921
BYU	13	–	5	.722	25	–	10	.714
Saint Mary's	13	–	5	.722	21	–	10	.677
Pepperdine	10	–	8	.556	18	–	14	.563
San Diego	8	–	10	.444	15	–	16	.484
Portland	7	–	11	.389	17	–	16	.515
Santa Clara	7	–	11	.389	14	–	18	.438
San Francisco	7	–	11	.389	14	–	18	.438
Pacific	4	–	14	.222	12	–	19	.387
Loyola Marymount	4	–	14	.222	8	–	23	.258
† Conference tournament winner Rankings from AP poll

The 2014–15 San Diego Toreros men's basketball team represented the University of San Diego during the 2014–15 NCAA Division I men's basketball season. This was head coach Bill Grier's eighth season at San Diego. The Toreros competed in the West Coast Conference and played their home games at the Jenny Craig Pavilion. They finished the season 15–16, 8–10 in WCC play to finish in fifth place. They lost in the quarterfinals of the WCC tournament to Pepperdine.

On March 16, head coach Bill Grier was fired. He had an eight-year record of 117–144.

== Previous season ==
The Toreros finished the season 18–17, 7–11 in WCC play to finish in a tie for sixth place. They lost in the quarterfinals of the WCC tournament to San Francisco. They were invited to the CollegeInsider.com Postseason Tournament where they defeated Portland State and Sam Houston State to advance to the quarterfinals where they lost to fellow WCC member Pacific.

== Departures ==
Name	Number	Pos.	Height	Weight	Year	Hometown	Notes
Mike Davis	2	G	6'2"	200	Senior	Houston, TX	Graduated
Keith Stackhouse	13	G	6'2"	185	RS Sophomore	Bellingham, WA	Walk-on didn't return
Jordan Bickerstaff	21	G	5'10"	150	RS Freshman	Denver, CO	Left the team
Trey Guidry	23	F	6'6"	215	Sophomore	Houston, TX	Left the team
Dennis Kramer	40	F	6'11"	235	Senior	Encinitas, CA	Graduated

== Recruits class of 2014 ==
College recruiting information
Name	Hometown	School	Height	Weight	Commit date
Khalil Bedart-Ghani; G	Los Angeles, CA	Loyola	6 ft 2 in (1.88 m)	185 lb (84 kg)	Feb 13, 2014
Khalil Bedart-Ghani; G	Recruit ratings: Scout: Rivals: (62)				
Cameron Neubauer; F	Berlin, Germany	Choate Rosemary Hall	6 ft 7 in (2.01 m)	210 lb (95 kg)	Mar 4, 2014
Cameron Neubauer; F	Recruit ratings: Scout: Rivals: (61)				
Marcus Harris; G	San Antonio, TX	Douglas MacArthur	5 ft 11 in (1.80 m)	155 lb (70 kg)	Sep 19, 2013
Marcus Harris; G	Recruit ratings: Scout: Rivals: (NR)				
Vasilije Pusica; G	Belgrade, Serbia	Sunrise Christian Academy	6 ft 4 in (1.93 m)	205 lb (93 kg)	Sep 19, 2013
Vasilije Pusica; G	Recruit ratings: Scout: Rivals: (NR)				
Overall recruit ranking: Scout: nr Rivals: nr ESPN: nr
Note: In many cases, Scout, Rivals, 247Sports, On3, and ESPN may conflict in their listings of height and weight.; In these cases, the average was taken. ESPN grades are on a 100-point scale.; Sources: "San Diego Toreros 2014 Basketball Commitments". Rivals.; "2014 San Diego Toreros Basketball Commits". Scout.; "ESPN 2014 San Diego Toreros Basketball recruits". ESPN.; "Scout.com Team Recruiting Rankings". Scout.; "2014 Team Ranking". Rivals.

=== Recruits class of 2015 ===
College recruiting information
Name	Hometown	School	Height	Weight	Commit date
Alex Floresca; F	St. Louis, MO	Webster Groves	6 ft 7 in (2.01 m)	215 lb (98 kg)	Aug 6, 2014
Alex Floresca; F	Recruit ratings: Scout: Rivals: (NR)				
Overall recruit ranking: Scout: nr Rivals: nr ESPN: nr
Note: In many cases, Scout, Rivals, 247Sports, On3, and ESPN may conflict in their listings of height and weight.; In these cases, the average was taken. ESPN grades are on a 100-point scale.; Sources: "San Diego Toreros 2015 Basketball Commitments". Rivals.; "2015 San Diego Toreros Basketball Commits". Scout.; "ESPN 2015 San Diego Toreros Basketball recruits". ESPN.; "Scout.com Team Recruiting Rankings". Scout.; "2015 Team Ranking". Rivals.

== Roster ==
2014–15 San Diego Toreros men's basketball team
Players
Coaches

Pos.	#	Name	Height	Weight	Year	Previous school	Hometown
G	00	Christopher Anderson	5 ft 7 in (1.7 m)	150 lb (68 kg)	Sr	Canyon	Anaheim Hills, CA
G	1	Johnny Dee	6 ft 0 in (1.83 m)	175 lb (79 kg)	Sr	Rancho Buena Vista	Vista, CA
F/C	2	Brandon Perry	6 ft 7 in (2.01 m)	265 lb (120 kg)	RS So	Taft; Cal State Northridge	Fresno, CA
G	3	Khalil Bedart-Ghani	6 ft 4 in (1.93 m)	192 lb (87 kg)	Fr	Loyola	Los Angeles, CA
G	4	Therone Tillett	5 ft 11 in (1.8 m)	180 lb (82 kg)	Jr	John R. Rogers	Spokane, WA
G	5	Chris Sarbaugh	6 ft 3 in (1.91 m)	200 lb (91 kg)	Jr	Gonzaga Prep; North Idaho	Spokane, WA
G	10	Duda Sanadze	6 ft 5 in (1.96 m)	220 lb (100 kg)	Jr	Tbilisi, Georgia
G	11	Marcus Harris	5 ft 11 in (1.8 m)	168 lb (76 kg)	Fr	MacArthur	San Antonio, TX
F	12	Cameron Naubauer	6 ft 7 in (2.01 m)	220 lb (100 kg)	Fr	Choate Rosemary Hall Prep	Berlin, Germany
G	13	Vasa Pusica	6 ft 4 in (1.93 m)	210 lb (95 kg)	Fr	Sunrise Christian Academy	Belgrade, Serbia
F	15	Thomas Jacobs	6 ft 6 in (1.98 m)	215 lb (98 kg)	RS Sr	Scripps Ranch; Cal State Northridge	San Diego, CA
G	20	Adam Gotelli	6 ft 2 in (1.88 m)	175 lb (79 kg)	Fr	Elliott Christian	Stockton, CA
G	21	Forrest Greenwalt	5 ft 9 in (1.75 m)	160 lb (73 kg)	So	Saint Mary's Hall	San Antonio, TX
G	22	Nick Kerr	6 ft 3 in (1.91 m)	180 lb (82 kg)	RS Jr	Torrey Pines	San Diego, CA
F/C	25	Simi Fajemisin	6 ft 10 in (2.08 m)	267 lb (121 kg)	RS Sr	Lynnwood	Lynnwood, WA
F	32	Brett Bailey	6 ft 6 in (1.98 m)	205 lb (93 kg)	So	University	Spokane, WA
F/C	33	Jito Kok	6 ft 9 in (2.06 m)	232 lb (105 kg)	Jr	Canarius Basketball Academy	Wageningen, Netherlands

Head coach

- Bill Grier (Oregon)

Assistant coach(es)

- Mike Burns (Central Washington)
- Rodney Tention (San Francisco)
- Kyle Bankhead (Gonzaga)

Legend

- (C) Team captain
- (S) Suspended
- (I) Ineligible
- (W) Walk-on
- Injured
- Current redshirt

Roster
Last update: 2014-10-02

== Schedule and results ==
Date time, TV	Opponent	Result	Record	Site (attendance) city, state
Non-conference regular season
11/14/2014*; 3:30 pm	vs. Boise State; LMU Classic	L 75–81	0–1	Gersten Pavilion (1,362); Los Angeles, CA
11/15/2014*; 2:30 pm	vs. Southeast Missouri State; LMU Classic	W 67–56	1–1	Gersten Pavilion (1,362); Los Angeles, CA
11/19/2014*; 7:00 pm, FSSD/TheW.tv	Florida A&M	W 72–41	2–1	Jenny Craig Pavilion (1,621); San Diego, CA
11/24/2014*; 7:00 pm, FSSD/TheW.tv	Western Michigan; Wooden Legacy Opening Round	W 77–70	3–1	Jenny Craig Pavilion (1,836); San Diego, CA
11/27/2014*; 1:30 pm, ESPN2	vs. Xavier; Wooden Legacy quarterfinals	L 71–82	3–2	Titan Gym (N/A); Fullerton, CA
11/28/2014*; 3:00 pm, ESPN3	vs. Princeton; Wooden Legacy consolation round	W 75–65	4–2	Titan Gym (1,312); Fullerton, CA
11/30/2014*; 11:00 am, ESPNU	vs. Western Michigan; Wooden Legacy 5th place game	W 68–66	4–3	Honda Center (N/A); Anaheim, CA
12/04/2014*; 8:00 pm, ESPNU	at No. 13 San Diego State; City Championship	L 48–57	4–4	Viejas Arena (12,414); San Diego, CA
12/07/2014*; 4:00 pm, P12N	at UCLA	L 68–75	4–5	Pauley Pavilion (6,389); Los Angeles, CA
12/11/2014*; 7:00 pm	at UC Santa Barbara	W 79–65	5–5	The Thunderdome (1,431); Santa Barbara, CA
12/13/2014*; 7:30 pm, FSSD/TheW.tv	New Orleans	W 85–60	6–5	Jenny Craig Pavilion (1,662); San Diego, CA
12/21/2014*; 1:00 pm, TheW.tv	San Diego Christian	W 71–61	7–5	Jenny Craig Pavilion (1,138); San Diego, CA
WCC regular season
12/27/2014; 6:00 pm, TheW.tv	Portland	L 58–61	7–6 (0–1)	Jenny Craig Pavilion (1,442); San Diego, CA
12/29/2014; 8:00 pm, TWCSN	No. 7 Gonzaga	L 48–60	7–7 (0–2)	Jenny Craig Pavilion (4,517); San Diego, CA
01/01/2015; 7:00 pm, TheW.tv	at San Francisco	W 57–56	8–7 (1–2)	War Memorial Gymnasium (1,861); San Francisco, CA
01/03/2015; 7:00 pm, TheW.tv	at Santa Clara	L 56–59	8–8 (1–3)	Leavey Center (1,331); Santa Clara, CA
01/08/2015; 8:00 pm, TWCSN	Loyola Marymount	W 59–50	9–8 (2–3)	Jenny Craig Pavilion (1,343); San Diego, CA
01/10/2015; 3:00 pm, TWCSN	Pepperdine	L 47–59	9–9 (2–4)	Jenny Craig Pavilion (1,378); San Diego, CA
01/15/2015; 8:00 pm, CSN BAY	at Saint Mary's	L 58–70	9–10 (2–5)	McKeon Pavilion (3,163); Moraga, CA
01/17/2015; 7:00 pm, TheW.tv	at Pacific	L 57–59	9–11 (2–6)	Alex G. Spanos Center (2,668); Stockton, CA
01/24/2015; 1:00 pm, TWCSN	BYU	W 77–74	10–11 (3–6)	Jenny Craig Pavilion (2,463); San Diego, CA
01/29/2015; 7:00 pm, TheW.tv	Santa Clara	W 69–64	11–11 (4–6)	Jenny Craig Pavilion (2,369); San Diego, CA
01/31/2015; 5:00 pm, TWCSN	San Francisco	W 77–69	12–11 (5–6)	Jenny Craig Pavilion (2,454); San Diego, CA
02/05/2015; 7:00 pm, TheW.tv	at Loyola Marymount	L 61–70	12–12 (5–7)	Gersten Pavilion (1,872); Los Angeles, CA
02/07/2015; 5:00 pm, TheW.tv	at Pepperdine	W 72–50	13–12 (6–7)	Firestone Fieldhouse (1,355); Malibu, CA
02/12/2015; 7:00 pm, TheW.tv	Pacific	W 68–48	14–12 (7–7)	Jenny Craig Pavilion (1,774); San Diego, CA
02/14/2015; 1:00 pm, TWCSN	Saint Mary's	L 62–69 ^{2OT}	14–13 (7–8)	Jenny Craig Pavilion (2,104); San Diego, CA
02/19/2015; 8:00 pm, ESPNU	at BYU	L 62–75	14–14 (7–9)	Marriott Center (17,092); Provo, UT
02/26/2015; 8:00 pm, ESPN2	at No. 3 Gonzaga	L 39–59	14–15 (7–10)	McCarthey Athletic Center (6,000); Spokane, WA
02/28/2015; 1:00 pm, TWCSN	at Portland	W 78–66	15–15 (8–10)	Chiles Center (2,137); Portland, OR
WCC tournament
03/06/2015; 2:00 pm, TWCSN/RTNW/BYUtv	vs. Pepperdine; Quarterfinals	L 47–50	15–16	Orleans Arena; Paradise, NV
*Non-conference game. ^{#}Rankings from AP Poll. (#) Tournament seedings in parentheses. All times are in Pacific Time.

== See also ==
- 2014–15 San Diego Toreros women's basketball team
