= 2014–15 Saint Mary's Gaels men's basketball team =

American college basketball season

2014–15 Saint Mary's Gaels men's basketball

NIT, First Round
- Conference: West Coast Conference
- Record: 21–10 (13–5 WCC)
- Head coach: Randy Bennett (14th season)
- Assistant coaches: Marty Clarke; Eran Ganot; Jim Shaw
- Home arena: McKeon Pavilion

2014–15 West Coast Conference men's basketball standings
	Conf.				Overall
Team	W		L	PCT	W		L	PCT
No. 7 Gonzaga †	17	–	1	.944	35	–	3	.921
BYU	13	–	5	.722	25	–	10	.714
Saint Mary's	13	–	5	.722	21	–	10	.677
Pepperdine	10	–	8	.556	18	–	14	.563
San Diego	8	–	10	.444	15	–	16	.484
Portland	7	–	11	.389	17	–	16	.515
Santa Clara	7	–	11	.389	14	–	18	.438
San Francisco	7	–	11	.389	14	–	18	.438
Pacific	4	–	14	.222	12	–	19	.387
Loyola Marymount	4	–	14	.222	8	–	23	.258
† Conference tournament winner Rankings from AP poll

The 2014–15 Saint Mary's Gaels men's basketball team represented Saint Mary's College of California during the 2014–15 NCAA Division I men's basketball season. This was head coach Randy Bennett's fourteenth season at Saint Mary's. The Gaels competed in the West Coast Conference and played their home games at the McKeon Pavilion. They finished the season 21–10, 13–5 in WCC play to finish in a tie for second place. They lost in the quarterfinals of the WCC tournament to Portland. They were invited to the National Invitation Tournament where they lost in the first round to Vanderbilt.

== Previous season ==
The Gaels finished the season 23–12, 11–7 in WCC play to finish in fourth place. They advanced to the semi-finals of the WCC tournament where they lost to Gonzaga. They were invited to the National Invitation Tournament where they defeated Utah in the first round before losing in the second round to Minnesota.

== Departures ==
Name	Number	Pos.	Height	Weight	Year	Hometown	Notes
Paul McCoy	2	G	5'11"	175	RS Senior	Portland, OR	Graduated
Jordan Giusti	12	G	6'2"	185	RS Sophomore	San Ramon, CA	Transferred
Eividas Petrulis	13	F	6'7"	210	RS Sophomore	Vilnius, Lithuania	Left the team
Stephen Holt	14	G	6'4"	195	Senior	Portland, OR	Graduated
Beau Levesque	15	F	6'6"	220	Senior	Lafayette, CA	Graduated
Matt Hodgson	33	C	6'11"	255	Senior	Booval, Queensland, Australia	Graduated
James Walker III	35	F	6'3"	185	Senior	Glendora, CA	Graduated

=== Incoming transfers ===
Name	Number	Pos.	Height	Weight	Year	Hometown	Previous School
Aaron Bright	20	G	5'11"	178	Senior	Bellevue, WA	Transferred from Stanford. Will be eligible to play immediately since Bright graduated from Stanford.
Desmond Simmons	30	F	6'7"	225	RS Senior	Vallejo, CA	Transferred from Washington. Will be eligible to play immediately since Simmons graduated from Washington.

== Recruiting ==
College recruiting information
Name	Hometown	School	Height	Weight	Commit date
Evan Fitzner; C	San Diego, California	Francis W. Parker	6 ft 10 in (2.08 m)	215 lb (98 kg)	Oct 8, 2013
Evan Fitzner; C	Recruit ratings: Scout: Rivals: (71)				
Jock Landale; C	Melbourne, Australia	Geelong Grammar	6 ft 11 in (2.11 m)	255 lb (116 kg)	
Jock Landale; C	Recruit ratings: Scout: Rivals: (nr)				
Tanner Krebs; PG	Hobart, Australia	Australian Institute of Sport	6 ft 4 in (1.93 m)	N/A	
Tanner Krebs; PG	Recruit ratings: Scout: Rivals: (nr)				
Overall recruit ranking: Scout: nr Rivals: nr ESPN: nr
Note: In many cases, Scout, Rivals, 247Sports, On3, and ESPN may conflict in their listings of height and weight.; In these cases, the average was taken. ESPN grades are on a 100-point scale.; Sources: "ESPN". ESPN.; "2014 Team Ranking". Rivals.

== Roster ==
2014–15 Saint Mary's Gaels men's basketball team
Players
Coaches

Pos.	#	Name	Height	Weight	Year	Previous school	Hometown
F	00	Brad Waldow	6 ft 9 in (2.06 m)	260 lb (118 kg)	RS Sr	Ponderosa	Shingle Springs, CA
G	3	Kerry Carter	6 ft 2 in (1.88 m)	205 lb (93 kg)	Sr	West Covina; Citrus College	West Covina, CA
G	5	Jack Biebel	5 ft 11 in (1.8 m)	185 lb (84 kg)	So	Archbishop Mitty; Foothill College	San Jose, CA
G	10	Joe Coleman	6 ft 4 in (1.93 m)	210 lb (95 kg)	RS Jr	Hopkins; Minnesota	Minneapolis, MN
F	11	Dane Pineau	6 ft 9 in (2.06 m)	225 lb (102 kg)	So	Melbourne Grammar	Melbourne, Australia
G	12	Tyler Harville	5 ft 11 in (1.8 m)	170 lb (77 kg)	Fr	Vermont Academy	Lexington, KY
C	13	Jock Landale	6 ft 11 in (2.11 m)	255 lb (116 kg)	Fr	Geelong Grammar	Malvern East, Victoria, Australia
G	20	Aaron Bright	5 ft 11 in (1.8 m)	175 lb (79 kg)	Sr	Bellevue; Stanford	Bellevue, WA
C	21	Evan Fitzner	6 ft 10 in (2.08 m)	215 lb (98 kg)	Fr	Francis Parker School	San Diego, CA
F	22	Garrett Jackson	6 ft 6 in (1.98 m)	225 lb (102 kg)	RS Sr	Westview	Portland, OR
F	24	Calvin Hermanson	6 ft 6 in (1.98 m)	200 lb (91 kg)	RS Fr	Lake Oswego	Lake Oswego, OR
G	25	Treaven Duffy	6 ft 2 in (1.88 m)	190 lb (86 kg)	RS So	Cushing Academy	Walnut Creek, CA
F	30	Desmond Simmons	6 ft 7 in (2.01 m)	225 lb (102 kg)	RS Sr	Salesian; Washington	Vallejo, CA
G	41	Emmett Naar	6 ft 1 in (1.85 m)	195 lb (88 kg)	RS Fr	Sydney Boys	Sydney, Australia

Head coach

- Randy Bennett (UC San Diego)

Assistant coach(es)

- Marty Clarke (Victoria)
- Eran Ganot (Swarthmore)
- Jim Shaw (Western Oregon)

Legend

- (C) Team captain
- (S) Suspended
- (I) Ineligible
- (W) Walk-on
- Injured
- Current redshirt

Roster
Last update: 2014-09-24

== Schedule and results ==
Date time, TV	Rank^{#}	Opponent^{#}	Result	Record	Site (attendance) city, state
Regular season
11/14/2014*; 7:00 pm, TheW.tv		Cal State Los Angeles	W 77–67	1–0	McKeon Pavilion (2,710); Moraga, CA
11/18/2014*; 12:00 am, ESPN2		New Mexico State; ESPN College Basketball Tip-Off Marathon	W 83–71	2–0	McKeon Pavilion (2,225); Moraga, CA
11/20/2014*; 7:00 pm, CHN		Denver	W 78–62	3–0	McKeon Pavilion (2,178); Moraga, CA
11/23/2014*; 6:00 pm, CHN		UC Irvine	W 72–69	4–0	McKeon Pavilion (2,685); Moraga, CA
11/29/2014*; 7:00 pm, CHN		Cal Poly	W 82–56	5–0	McKeon Pavilion (2,703); Moraga, CA
12/06/2014*; 8:30 pm, ESPNU		Boise State	L 71–82	5–1	McKeon Pavilion (3,008); Moraga, CA
12/13/2014*; 11:00 am, FS1		at Creighton	W 71–67 ^{OT}	6–1	CenturyLink Center (16,435); Omaha, NE
12/16/2014*; 7:00 pm, TheW.tv		Northern Arizona	L 71–73	6–2	McKeon Pavilion (2,402); Moraga, CA
12/19/2014*; 4:00 pm, FS1		at No. 20 St. John's	L 47–53	6–3	Carnesecca Arena (4,645); Queens, NY
12/22/2014*; 6:00 pm, TheW.tv		Northeastern	W 72–68 ^{OT}	7–3	McKeon Pavilion (2,621); Moraga, CA
12/27/2014; 1:00 pm, CSNCA		Santa Clara	W 73–60	8–3 (1–0)	McKeon Pavilion (3,256); Moraga, CA
12/29/2014; 6:00 pm, ESPNU		San Francisco	W 69–56	9–3 (2–0)	McKeon Pavilion (3,126); Moraga, CA
01/01/2015; 5:00 pm, TheW.tv		at Pepperdine	W 68–59	10–3 (3–0)	Firestone Fieldhouse (1,030); Malibu, CA
01/03/2015; 1:00 pm, CSNCA		at Loyola Marymount	W 72–63	11–3 (4–0)	Gersten Pavilion (1,109); Los Angeles, CA
01/06/2015*; 7:00 pm, TheW.tv		Morgan State	W 78–52	12–3	McKeon Pavilion (2,278); Moraga, CA
01/10/2015; 8:00 pm, CSN BAY		at Pacific	W 54–47	13–3 (5–0)	Alex G. Spanos Center (2,677); Stockton, CA
01/15/2015; 8:00 pm, CSN BAY		San Diego	W 70–58	14–3 (6–0)	McKeon Pavilion (3,163); Moraga, CA
01/17/2015; 8:00 pm, ESPN2		BYU	W 82–77	15–3 (7–0)	McKeon Pavilion (3,500); Moraga, CA
01/22/2015; 8:00 pm, ESPNU		at No. 3 Gonzaga	L 47–68	15–4 (7–1)	McCarthey Athletic Center (6,000); Spokane, WA
01/24/2015; 7:00 pm, TheW.tv		at Portland	W 74–64	16–4 (8–1)	Chiles Center (2,883); Portland, OR
01/29/2015; 7:30 pm, CSNCA		Loyola Marymount	W 68–54	17–4 (9–1)	McKeon Pavilion (2,971); Moraga, CA
01/31/2015; 3:00 pm, CSN BAY		Pepperdine	L 62–67	17–5 (9–2)	McKeon Pavilion (3,381); Moraga, CA
02/07/2015; 7:00 pm, TheW.tv		Pacific	W 73–58	18–5 (10–2)	McKeon Pavilion (3,081); Moraga, CA
02/12/2015; 6:00 pm, ESPN2		at BYU	L 60–82	18–6 (10–3)	Marriott Center (14,317); Provo, UT
02/14/2015; 1:00 pm, CSNCA		at San Diego	W 69–62 ^{2OT}	19–6 (11–3)	Jenny Craig Pavilion (2,104); San Diego, CA
01/19/2015; 8:00 pm, TheW.tv		Portland	W 68–51	20–6 (12–3)	McKeon Pavilion (2,855); Moraga, CA
02/21/2015; 7:00 pm, ESPN2		No. 3 Gonzaga	L 60–70	20–7 (12–4)	McKeon Pavilion (3,500); Moraga, CA
02/26/2014; 8:00 pm, CSN BAY		at San Francisco	W 84–53	21–7 (13–4)	War Memorial Gymnasium (2,081); San Francisco, CA
02/28/2015; 5:00 pm, CSN BAY		at Santa Clara	L 70–71	21–8 (13–5)	Leavey Center (2,750); Santa Clara, CA
WCC tournament
03/07/2015; 12:00 pm, CSNCA/RTNW/BYUtv		vs. Portland; Quarterfinals	L 52–69	21–9	Orleans Arena (8,064); Paradise, NV
NIT
03/18/2015*; 6:00 pm, ESPN2	No. (4)	(5) Vanderbilt; First round	L 64–75	21–10	McKeon Pavilion (1,322); Moraga, CA
*Non-conference game. ^{#}Rankings from AP Poll. (#) Tournament seedings in parentheses. All times are in Pacific Time. (#) during NIT is seed within region.
