= Ron Verlin =

American basketball coach (born 1965)

Biographical details
- Born: June 15, 1965 (age 61); Roseville, California, U.S.
- Education: Sacramento State

Coaching career (HC unless noted)
- 1989–1991: Sierra (asst.)
- 1991–1993: Nevada (asst)
- 1993–1994: Columbia (CA)
- 1994–2013: Pacific (asst.)
- 2013–2015: Pacific

Ronald Dean Verlin (born June 15, 1965) is an American college basketball coach and the former head coach of the men's basketball team at the University of the Pacific. He is also the twin brother of former Idaho Vandals men's basketball coach Don Verlin.

== Head coaching record ==
Record table
Season	Team	Overall	Conference	Standing	Postseason
Pacific Tigers (West Coast Conference) (2013–Dec. 2015)
2013–14	Pacific	18–16	6–12	8th	
2014–15	Pacific	12–19	4–14	T–9th	
2015–16	Pacific	1–7	0–0		
Pacific:		31–42	10–26		
Total:		31–42			
National champion Postseason invitational champion Conference regular season champion Conference regular season and conference tournament champion Division regular season champion Division regular season and conference tournament champion Conference tournament champion

- On December 12, 2015, 8 games into the season, Verlin was suspended indefinitely amid an NCAA investigation. On March 3 it was announced he had been let go by the university.
