= 2014–15 Pacific Tigers men's basketball team =

American college basketball season

2014–15 Pacific Tigers men's basketball
- Conference: West Coast Conference
- Record: 12–19 (4–14 WCC)
- Head coach: Ron Verlin (2nd season)
- Assistant coaches: Adam Jacobsen; Calvin Byrd; Dwight Young
- Home arena: Alex G. Spanos Center

2014–15 West Coast Conference men's basketball standings
| | Conf. | | | | Overall |
| Team | W | | L | PCT | W | | L | PCT |
|---|---|---|---|---|---|---|---|---|
| No. 7 Gonzaga † | 17 | – | 1 | .944 | 35 | – | 3 | .921 |
| BYU | 13 | – | 5 | .722 | 25 | – | 10 | .714 |
| Saint Mary's | 13 | – | 5 | .722 | 21 | – | 10 | .677 |
| Pepperdine | 10 | – | 8 | .556 | 18 | – | 14 | .563 |
| San Diego | 8 | – | 10 | .444 | 15 | – | 16 | .484 |
| Portland | 7 | – | 11 | .389 | 17 | – | 16 | .515 |
| Santa Clara | 7 | – | 11 | .389 | 14 | – | 18 | .438 |
| San Francisco | 7 | – | 11 | .389 | 14 | – | 18 | .438 |
| Pacific | 4 | – | 14 | .222 | 12 | – | 19 | .387 |
| Loyola Marymount | 4 | – | 14 | .222 | 8 | – | 23 | .258 |
† Conference tournament winner Rankings from AP poll

The 2014–15 Pacific Tigers men's basketball team represented the University of the Pacific during the 2014–15 NCAA Division I men's basketball season. They played their home games at the Alex G. Spanos Center and were members of the West Coast Conference. The Tigers were led by second-year head coach Ron Verlin. They finished the season 12–19, 4–14 in WCC play to finish in a tie for ninth place. They lost in the first round of the WCC tournament to San Francisco.

== Previous season ==
The Tigers finished the season 18–16, 6–12 in WCC play to finish in a tie for eighth place. They lost in the first round of the WCC tournament to Santa Clara. They were invited to the CollegeInsider.com Tournament where they defeated Grand Canyon, Texas A&M Corpus–Christi and fellow WCC member San Diego to advance to the semifinals where they lost to Murray State.

== Departures ==
| Name | Number | Pos. | Height | Weight | Year | Hometown | Notes |
|---|---|---|---|---|---|---|---|
| Trevin Harris | 1 | F | 6'5" | 215 | Senior | Kingwood, TX | Graduated |
| Sama Taku | 3 | G | 6'2" | 185 | Senior | Tucson, AZ | Graduated |
| Spencer Llewellyn | 5 | G | 6'3" | 200 | Junior | Sydney, Australia | Graduate transfer to San Francisco State |
| Andrew Bock | 12 | G | 6'2" | 175 | Senior | Rialto, CA | Graduated |
| Khalil Kelley | 13 | F | 6'8" | 225 | Senior | Rancho Cucamonga, CA | Graduated |
| Aaron Short | 15 | G | 6'3" | 215 | Junior | Reno, NV | Transferred |
| Ross Rivera | 20 | G | 6'7" | 225 | Senior | Visalia, CA | Graduated |
| Tony Gill | 33 | F | 6'8" | 220 | Senior | Roseville, CA | Graduated |
| Tim Thomas | 42 | C | 6'10" | 255 | Senior | Sheridan, WY | Graduated |

=== Incoming transfers ===
| Name | Number | Pos. | Height | Weight | Year | Hometown | Previous School |
|---|---|---|---|---|---|---|---|
| Alec Kobre | 3 | G | 6'3" | 175 | Junior | Santa Rosa, CA | Junior college transfer from Santa Rosa Junior College. |
| Dulani Robinson | 5 | G | 5'8" | 160 | Junior | Oakland, CA | Junior college transfer from City College of San Francisco. |
| Cole Currie | 10 | G | 6'3" | 185 | Sophomore | La Crescenta, CA | Transferred from Tulane. Under NCAA transfer rules, Currie will have to redshirt for the 2014–15 season. Will have three years of remaining eligibility. |
| Eric Thompson | 12 | F | 6'8" | 270 | Junior | Pontiac, MI | Junior college transfer from Saddleback College. |
| Sami Eleraky | 35 | C | 7'0" | 242 | Sophomore | Aalborg, Denmark | Junior college transfer from City College of San Francisco. |

== Recruiting Class of 2014 ==
College recruiting information
| Name | Hometown | School | Height | Weight | Commit date |
|---|---|---|---|---|---|
| D.J. Ursery; G | Encino, California | Crespi Carmlite | 6 ft 3 in (1.91 m) | 175 lb (79 kg) | Oct 18, 2013 |
| D.J. Ursery; G | Recruit ratings: Scout: Rivals: (70) | | | | |
| Kaleb Warner; F | Seattle, Washington | Mercer Island | 6 ft 6 in (1.98 m) | 180 lb (82 kg) | Sep 16, 2013 |
| Kaleb Warner; F | Recruit ratings: Scout: Rivals: (69) | | | | |
| Jacob Lampkin; F | Clyde Hill, Washington | O'Dea | 6 ft 9 in (2.06 m) | 195 lb (88 kg) | Sep 16, 2013 |
| Jacob Lampkin; F | Recruit ratings: Scout: Rivals: (59) | | | | |
| Ilias Theodorou; F | Athens, Greece | St. John's Northwestern Military | 6 ft 8 in (2.03 m) | 195 lb (88 kg) | Apr 13, 2014 |
| Ilias Theodorou; F | Recruit ratings: Scout: Rivals: (nr) | | | | |
Overall recruit ranking: Scout: 98 Rivals: nr ESPN: nr
Note: In many cases, Scout, Rivals, 247Sports, On3, and ESPN may conflict in their listings of height and weight.; In these cases, the average was taken. ESPN grades are on a 100-point scale.; Sources: "Pacific 2014 Basketball Commitments". Rivals.; "2014 Pacific Basketball Commits". Scout.; "ESPN". ESPN.; "Scout.com Team Recruiting Rankings". Scout.; "2014 Team Ranking". Rivals.

=== Recruiting Class of 2015 ===
College recruiting information
| Name | Hometown | School | Height | Weight | Commit date |
|---|---|---|---|---|---|
| Anthony Townes; F | Modesto, California | Modesto Christian | 6 ft 5 in (1.96 m) | 205 lb (93 kg) | Jan 7, 2014 |
| Anthony Townes; F | Recruit ratings: Scout: Rivals: (63) | | | | |
Overall recruit ranking: Scout: 98 Rivals: nr ESPN: nr
Note: In many cases, Scout, Rivals, 247Sports, On3, and ESPN may conflict in their listings of height and weight.; In these cases, the average was taken. ESPN grades are on a 100-point scale.; Sources: "Pacific 2015 Basketball Commitments". Rivals.; "2015 Pacific Basketball Commits". Scout.; "ESPN". ESPN.; "Scout.com Team Recruiting Rankings". Scout.; "2015 Team Ranking". Rivals.

== Roster ==
2014–15 Pacific Tigers men's basketball team
Players
Coaches

| Pos. | # | Name | Height | Weight | Year | Previous school | Hometown |
|---|---|---|---|---|---|---|---|
| G | 2 | T. J. Wallace | 6 ft 3 in (1.91 m) | 205 lb (93 kg) | So | Modesto Christian | Stockton, CA |
| G | 3 | Alec Kobre | 6 ft 2 in (1.88 m) | 185 lb (84 kg) | Jr | Montgomery; Santa Rosa JC | Santa Rosa, CA |
| G | 4 | Aaron Hendricks | 6 ft 0 in (1.83 m) | 185 lb (84 kg) | RS So | New Hampton School | Loomis, CA |
| G | 5 | Dulani Robinson | 5 ft 9 in (1.75 m) | 165 lb (75 kg) | Jr | McClymonds; City College of San Francisco | Oakland, CA |
| G | 10 | Cole Currie (redshirt) | 6 ft 2 in (1.88 m) | 165 lb (75 kg) | So | Crescenta Valley; Tulane | La Crescenta, CA |
| F | 11 | Gabriel Aguirre | 6 ft 10 in (2.08 m) | 250 lb (113 kg) | Sr | City College of San Francisco | São Paulo, Brazil |
| F | 12 | Eric Thompson | 6 ft 8 in (2.03 m) | 240 lb (109 kg) | Jr | Saddleback College | Detroit, MI |
| G | 15 | D. J. Ursery | 6 ft 4 in (1.93 m) | 185 lb (84 kg) | Fr | Crespi Carmelite | Los Angeles, CA |
| F | 21 | Jacob Lampkin | 6 ft 9 in (2.06 m) | 230 lb (104 kg) | Fr | O'Dea | Bellevue, WA |
| G | 22 | Ray Bowles | 6 ft 5 in (1.96 m) | 190 lb (86 kg) | RS Fr | Modesto Christian | Modesto, CA |
| F | 24 | David Taylor | 6 ft 3 in (1.91 m) | 180 lb (82 kg) | So | Graf-Münster-Gymnasium | Eclersdorf, Germany |
| F | 25 | Kaleb Warner | 6 ft 6 in (1.98 m) | 190 lb (86 kg) | Fr | Mercer Island | Seattle, WA |
| F | 30 | Thomas Peters | 6 ft 6 in (1.98 m) | 200 lb (91 kg) | RS So | Archbishop Mitty | Campbell, CA |
| F | 33 | Ilias Theodorou | 6 ft 7 in (2.01 m) | 200 lb (91 kg) | Fr | St. John's NW Military Acad. | Athens, Greece |
| C | 35 | Sami Eleraky | 7 ft 0 in (2.13 m) | 245 lb (111 kg) | So | City College of San Francisco | Aalborg, Denmark |

Head coach

- Ron Verlin (Sacramento State)

Assistant coach(es)

- Adam Jacobsen (Pacific)
- Calvin Byrd (Villanova)
- Dwight Young (Oregon State)

Legend

- (C) Team captain
- (S) Suspended
- (I) Ineligible
- (W) Walk-on
- Injured
- Current redshirt

Roster
Last update: 2014-09-22

== Schedule ==
| Date time, TV | Opponent | Result | Record | Site (attendance) city, state |
Exhibition
| 11/08/2014; 7:00 pm, TheW.tv | Sonoma State | W 83–62 | | Alex G. Spanos Center (2,424); Stockton, CA |
Regular season
| 11/14/2014*; 5:00 pm | at Western Illinois | W 73–71 | 1–0 | Western Hall (1,323); Macomb, IL |
| 11/16/2014*; 3:00 pm | at UC Irvine | L 50–68 | 1–1 | Bren Events Center (1,783); Irvine, CA |
| 11/20/2014; 7:00 pm, TheW.tv | Pacific Union | W 81–56 | 2–1 | Alex G. Spanos Center (1,743); Stockton, CA |
| 11/23/2014*; 8:00 pm, P12N | vs. Washington; Marv Harshman Classic | L 69–76 | 2–2 | KeyArena (2,512); Seattle, WA |
| 11/26/2014*; 8:30 pm, CBSSN | at Alaska Anchorage; Great Alaska Shootout quarterfinals | W 71–62 | 3–2 | Alaska Airlines Center (2,973); Anchorage, AK |
| 11/28/2014*; 8:30 pm, CBSSN | vs. Colorado State; Great Alaska Shootout semifinals | L 64–75 | 3–3 | Alaska Airlines Center (2,903); Anchorage, AK |
| 11/29/2014*; 8:00 pm, CBSSN | vs. Mercer; Great Alaska Shootout 3rd place game | W 55–48 | 4–3 | Alaska Airlines Center (3,110); Anchorage, AK |
| 12/03/2014*; 7:00 pm, TheW.tv | Cal State East Bay | W 80–51 | 5–3 | Alex G. Spanos Center (1,704); Stockton, CA |
| 12/06/2014*; 7:05 pm | at Idaho State | W 68–62 | 6–3 | Holt Arena (1,554); Pocatello, ID |
| 12/14/2014*; 5:00 pm, TheW.tv | Western Michigan | L 72–80 | 6–4 | Alex G. Spanos Center (1,736); Stockton, CA |
| 12/18/2014*; 7:00 pm, TheW.tv | Nevada | W 69–65 | 7–4 | Alex G. Spanos Center (1,778); Stockton, CA |
| 12/20/2014*; 7:00 pm, TheW.tv | Fresno State | L 68–71 | 8–4 | Alex G. Spanos Center (2,326); Stockton, CA |
| 12/27/2014; 3:00 pm, CSNCA | San Francisco | L 71–77 | 8–5 (0–1) | Alex G. Spanos Center (2,340); Stockton, CA |
| 12/29/2014; 7:00 pm, TheW.tv | Santa Clara | L 40–57 | 8–6 (0–2) | Alex G. Spanos Center (2,007); Stockton, CA |
| 01/01/2015; 1:00 pm, TWCSN | at Loyola Marymount | W 77–63 | 9–6 (1–2) | Gersten Pavilion (1,061); Los Angeles, CA |
| 01/03/2015; 5:00 pm, TheW.tv | at Pepperdine | L 61–71 | 9–7 (1–3) | Firestone Fieldhouse (905); Malibu, CA |
| 01/10/2015; 8:00 pm, CSN BAY | Saint Mary's | L 47–54 | 9–8 (1–4) | Alex G. Spanos Center (2,677); Stockton, CA |
| 01/15/2015; 8:00 pm, ESPNU | BYU | L 80–93 | 9–9 (1–5) | Alex G. Spanos Center (3,626); Stockton, CA |
| 01/17/2015; 7:00 pm, TheW.tv | San Diego | W 59–57 | 10–9 (2–5) | Alex G. Spanos Center (2,668); Stockton, CA |
| 01/22/2015; 7:00 pm, RTNW/TheW.tv | at Portland | L 69–72 | 10–10 (2–6) | Chiles Center (1,244); Portland, OR |
| 01/24/2015; 5:00 pm, RTNW/TheW.tv | at No. 3 Gonzaga | L 60–91 | 10–11 (2–7) | McCarthey Athletic Center (6,000); Spokane, WA |
| 01/29/2015; 7:00 pm, TheW.tv | Pepperdine | L 43–50 | 10–12 (2–8) | Alex G. Spanos Center (2,396); Stockton, CA |
| 01/31/2015; 1:00 pm, CSNCA | Loyola Marymount | L 71–76 ^{OT} | 10–13 (2–9) | Alex G. Spanos Center (2,446); Stockton, CA |
| 02/07/2015; 7:00 pm, TheW.tv | at Saint Mary's | L 58–73 | 10–14 (2–10) | McKeon Pavilion (3,081); Moraga, CA |
| 02/12/2015; 7:00 pm, TheW.tv | at San Diego | L 48–68 | 10–15 (2–11) | Jenny Craig Pavilion (1,774); San Diego, CA |
| 02/14/2015; 7:00 pm, BYUtv | at BYU | L 59–84 | 10–16 (2–12) | Marriott Center (16,202); Provo, UT |
| 02/19/2015; 8:00 pm, CSN BAY | No. 3 Gonzaga | L 74–86 | 10–17 (2–13) | Alex G. Spanos Center (5,672); Stockton, CA |
| 02/21/2015; 7:00 pm, TheW.tv | Portland | W 79–77 ^{OT} | 11–17 (3–13) | Alex G. Spanos Center (2,653); Stockton, CA |
| 02/26/2015; 7:00 pm, TheW.tv | at Santa Clara | W 64–57 | 12–17 (4–13) | Leavey Center (1,110); Santa Clara, CA |
| 02/28/2015; 7:00 pm, CSN BAY | at San Francisco | L 55–65 | 12–18 (4–14) | War Memorial Gymnasium (1,545); San Francisco, CA |
WCC tournament
| 03/06/2015; 6:00 pm, BYUtv | vs. San Francisco; First round | L 58–62 | 12–19 | Orleans Arena (7,110); Paradise, NV |
*Non-conference game. ^{#}Rankings from AP Poll. (#) Tournament seedings in parentheses. All times are in Pacific Time.
