= 2014–15 Mountain West Conference men's basketball season =

- League: NCAA Division I
- Sport: Basketball
- Teams: 11
- TV partner(s): CBS Sports Network, ESPN Networks and Root Sports

Tournament

Mountain West men's basketball seasons
- ← 2013–14 2015–16 →

2014–15 Mountain West Conference men's basketball standings
	Conf.				Overall
Team	W		L	PCT	W		L	PCT
Boise State	14	–	4	.778	25	–	9	.735
San Diego State	14	–	4	.778	27	–	9	.750
Colorado State	13	–	5	.722	27	–	7	.794
Wyoming †	11	–	7	.611	25	–	10	.714
Utah State	11	–	7	.611	18	–	13	.581
Fresno State	10	–	8	.556	15	–	17	.469
UNLV	8	–	10	.444	18	–	15	.545
New Mexico	7	–	11	.389	15	–	16	.484
Air Force	6	–	12	.333	14	–	17	.452
Nevada	5	–	13	.278	9	–	22	.290
San Jose State*	0	–	18	.000	2	–	28	.067
† 2015 MWC tournament winner *Ineligible for postseason play due to APR penalties

The 2014–15 Mountain West Conference men's basketball season will be the 16th season of Mountain West Conference basketball.

The defending regular season is San Diego State and tournament champions is New Mexico.

== All-Conference Teams ==
Derrick Marks was named player of the year and Leon Rice was named coach of the year. The All-Conference teams are as follows:

- First Team
  - G Derrick Marks, Sr., Boise State
  - F Larry Nance Jr., Sr., Wyoming
  - F. J. J. Avila, Sr., Colorado State
  - F Christian Wood, So., UNLV
  - G Marvelle Harris, Jr., Fresno State
- Second Team
  - F James Webb III, RSo., Boise State
  - F Jalen Moore, So., Utah State
  - F A. J. West, Jr., Nevada
  - G/F Winston Shepard, Jr., San Diego State
  - F J. J. O'Brien, Sr., San Diego State
- Third Team
  - G Daniel Bejarano, Sr., Colorado State
  - G Hugh Greenwood, Sr., New Mexico
  - G Josh Adams, Jr., Wyoming
  - G Aqeel Quinn, Sr., San Diego State
  - G Rashad Vaughn, Fr., UNLV
- Honorable Mention
  - F David Collette, RFr., Utah State
  - G Patrick McCaw, Fr., UNLV
  - G Deshawn Delaney, Sr., New Mexico
  - F Stanton Kidd, Sr., Colorado State
  - G Rashad Muhammad, So., San Jose State
  - G Chris Smith, Jr., Utah State
  - F Marek Olesinski, Sr., Air Force
