= 2014–15 Utah State Aggies men's basketball team =

American college basketball season

2014–15 Utah State Aggies men's basketball
- Conference: Mountain West Conference
- Record: 18–13 (11–7 Mountain West)
- Head coach: Stew Morrill (17th season)
- Assistant coaches: Tim Duryea; Chris Jones; Tarvish Felton
- Home arena: Smith Spectrum

2014–15 Mountain West Conference men's basketball standings
	Conf.				Overall
Team	W		L	PCT	W		L	PCT
Boise State	14	–	4	.778	25	–	9	.735
San Diego State	14	–	4	.778	27	–	9	.750
Colorado State	13	–	5	.722	27	–	7	.794
Wyoming †	11	–	7	.611	25	–	10	.714
Utah State	11	–	7	.611	18	–	13	.581
Fresno State	10	–	8	.556	15	–	17	.469
UNLV	8	–	10	.444	18	–	15	.545
New Mexico	7	–	11	.389	15	–	16	.484
Air Force	6	–	12	.333	14	–	17	.452
Nevada	5	–	13	.278	9	–	22	.290
San Jose State*	0	–	18	.000	2	–	28	.067
† 2015 MWC tournament winner *Ineligible for postseason play due to APR penalties

The 2014–15 Utah State Aggies men's basketball team represented Utah State University in the 2014–15 NCAA Division I men's basketball season. This was head coach Stew Morrill's 17th and final season at Utah State. The Aggies played their home games at the Dee Glen Smith Spectrum and were a member of the Mountain West Conference. They finished the season 18–13, 11–7 in Mountain West play to finish in a tie for fourth place. They lost in the quarterfinals of the Mountain West tournament to Wyoming.

On January 9, Stew Morrill announced his intention to retire at the end of the season. He finished his 17-year career at Utah State with a record of 402–156.

== Previous season ==
The 2013–14 Utah State finished the season with an overall record of 18–14, 7–11 in Mountain West play to finish in a tie for eighth place. They lost in the quarterfinals of the Mountain West Conference tournament to San Diego State.

== Departures ==
Name	Number	Pos.	Height	Weight	Year	Hometown	Notes
Marcel Davis	0	G	6'2"	180	Sophomore	American Fork, UT	Transferred to Utah Valley
James Young	3	G	6'3"	180	Freshman	Salt Lake City, UT	Left the team for personal reasons
Jarred Shaw	5	F/C	6'10"	235	Senior	Dallas, TX	Graduated
Danny Berger	12	G/F	6'6"	205	RS Junior	Medford, OR	Transferred to BYU–Hawaii
Preston Medlin	13	G	6'4"	185	RS Senior	Carrollton, TX	Graduated
TeNale Roland	20	G	6'1"	170	Senior	Louisville, KY	Graduated
Spencer Butterfield	21	G/F	6'3"	205	Senior	Loomis, CA	Graduated
Kyle Davis	23	F	6'7"	225	Sophomore	Draper, UT	Transferred to BYU
Jordan Stone	25	C	6'10"	270	Junior	Smithfield, UT	Transferred to BYU–Hawaii
Terrell Croasdell	31	F	6'7"	210	Freshman	Albuquerque, NM	LDS Mission (returning in 2016)
Carson Shanks	41	C	7'0"	235	Freshman	Prior Lake, MN	Transferred to North Dakota

=== Incoming transfers ===
Name	Number	Pos.	Height	Weight	Year	Hometown	Previous School
Darius Perkins	3	G	6'2"	180	Junior	Fort Myers, FL	Miami Dade College
Chris Smith	34	G	6'4"	200	Junior	Antelope, CA	Yuba College

== Recruiting ==
College recruiting
Name	Hometown	School	Height	Weight	Commit date
Elston Jones; C	Goodyear, AZ	Millennium	6 ft 9 in (2.06 m)	230 lb (100 kg)	Mar 17, 2014
Elston Jones; C	Recruit ratings: Scout: Rivals: (67)				
Sam Merrill; SG	Bountiful, UT	Bountiful	6 ft 4 in (1.93 m)	185 lb (84 kg)	N/A
Sam Merrill; SG	Recruit ratings: Scout: Rivals: (60)				
Henry Bolton; SG	Portsmouth, RI	St. Andrew's School	6 ft 1 in (1.85 m)	N/A	Oct 7, 2013
Henry Bolton; SG	Recruit ratings: Scout: Rivals: (N/A)				
Julion Pearre; SG	McKinney, TX	McKinney North	6 ft 2 in (1.88 m)	N/A	Sep 20, 2013
Julion Pearre; SG	Recruit ratings: Scout: Rivals: (N/A)				
Overall recruit ranking: Scout: – Rivals: –
Note: In many cases, Scout, Rivals, 247Sports, On3, and ESPN may conflict in their listings of height and weight.; In these cases, the average was taken. ESPN grades are on a 100-point scale.; Sources: "Utah State Commit List for 2014". Rivals.; "Men's Basketball Recruiting". Scout.; "ESPN – Utah State Aggies Basketball Recruiting 2014". ESPN.; "Scout.com Team Recruiting Rankings". Scout.; "2014 Team Ranking". Rivals.

== Roster ==
2014–15 Utah State Aggies men's basketball team
Players
Coaches

Pos.	#	Name	Height	Weight	Year	Previous school	Hometown
G	0	Trace Cureton	6 ft 4 in (1.93 m)	185 lb (84 kg)	Jr	Sinclair CC	Indianapolis, IN
G	1	Viko Noma'aea	6 ft 1 in (1.85 m)	170 lb (77 kg)	So	Sierra Vista	Las Vegas, NV
G	2	Darius Perkins	6 ft 1 in (1.85 m)	200 lb (91 kg)	Jr	Chaminade-Madonna College Prep; Miami Dade College	Fort Myers, FL
G	3	Sam Orchard	6 ft 1 in (1.85 m)	180 lb (82 kg)	RS Fr	Highland	Salt Lake City, UT
G	5	Julion Pearre	6 ft 3 in (1.91 m)	185 lb (84 kg)	Fr	McKinney North HS	McKinney, TX
G	11	Konner Frey	6 ft 5 in (1.96 m)	210 lb (95 kg)	So	Viewmont; Northwest College	Bountiful, UT
F	12	Lew Evans (I)	6 ft 8 in (2.03 m)	235 lb (107 kg)	Jr	New Hampton Prep; Tulsa	Salt Lake City, UT
F	13	David Collette	6 ft 8 in (2.03 m)	220 lb (100 kg)	RS Fr	Murray	Murray, UT
F	14	Jalen Moore	6 ft 7 in (2.01 m)	190 lb (86 kg)	So	Sky View	Smithfield, UT
G	20	Henry Bolton	6 ft 2 in (1.88 m)	185 lb (84 kg)	Fr	St. Andrew's	Portsmith, UT
G	22	John Bennett	6 ft 2 in (1.88 m)	180 lb (82 kg)	Fr	Pinewood School	Palo Alto, CA
G	24	JoJo McGlaston	6 ft 3 in (1.91 m)	180 lb (82 kg)	So	Dublin	Dublin, CA
F	30	Sean Harris	6 ft 7 in (2.01 m)	220 lb (100 kg)	Sr	Rocklin; Yuba CC	Rocklin, CA
G	32	Grayson Moore	6 ft 7 in (2.01 m)	200 lb (91 kg)	Sr	Sky View; Northwest Nazarene	North Logan, UT
G	34	Chris Smith	6 ft 4 in (1.93 m)	210 lb (95 kg)	Sr	Center High; Yuba College	Sacramento, CA
F	50	Elston Jones	6 ft 9 in (2.06 m)	240 lb (109 kg)	Fr	Millennium	Goodyear, AZ
C	55	Bilal Begic	7 ft 1 in (2.16 m)	225 lb (102 kg)	So	Treca Gimnazija	Sarajevo, Bosnia-Herzegovina

Head coach

- Stew Morrill (Ricks College;
  Gonzaga)

Assistant coach(es)

- Tim Duryea (North Texas)
- Chris Jones (Utah)
- Tarvish Felton (Southern Utah University)

Legend

- (C) Team captain
- (S) Suspended
- (I) Ineligible
- (W) Walk-on
- Injured
- Current redshirt

== Schedule ==
Date time, TV	Opponent	Result	Record	Site (attendance) city, state
Exhibition
10/31/2014*; 7:05 pm	Texas A&M International	W 77–70		Smith Spectrum (6,133); Logan, UT
11/07/2014*; 7:05 pm	Arkansas–Fort Smith	W 64–57		Smith Spectrum (7,987); Logan, UT
Regular season
11/14/2014*; 7:05 pm	Weber State; Old Oquirrh Bucket	W 72–61	1–0	Smith Spectrum (9,982); Logan, UT
11/16/2014*; 3:00 pm	at Illinois State	W 60–55	2–0	Redbird Arena (4,921); Normal, IL
11/19/2014*; 7:05 pm, RTRM	Santa Clara	W 60–54	3–0	Smith Spectrum (9,334); Logan, UT
11/22/2014*; 1:00 pm	at Mississippi State	L 63–71	3–1	Humphrey Coliseum (7,240); Starkville, MS
11/26/2014*; 8:00 pm	at UC Davis	L 70–77 ^{OT}	3–2	The Pavilion (1,877); Davis, CA
12/02/2014*; 7:00 pm, CBSSN	BYU; Old Oquirrh Bucket	L 81–91	3–3	Smith Spectrum (10,270); Logan, UT
12/07/2014*; 3:00 pm, P12N	at USC	L 84–89	3–4	Galen Center (3,189); Los Angeles, CA
12/13/2014*; 7:00 pm	at Utah Valley; Old Oquirrh Bucket	W 50–47	4–4	UCCU Center (6,121); Orem, UT
12/18/2014*; 8:05 pm, KMYU	Cal State Bakersfield; World Vision Classic	W 57–56	5–4	Smith Spectrum (7,049); Logan, UT
12/19/2014*; 8:05 pm, KMYU	Idaho State; World Vision Classic	W 69–56	6–4	Smith Spectrum (7,188); Logan, UT
12/20/2014*; 8:05 pm, KMYU	South Dakota State; World Vision Classic	L 65–69 ^{OT}	6–5	Smith Spectrum (7,216); Logan, UT
12/27/2014*; 7:05 pm	Wayland Baptist	W 75–63	7–5	Smith Spectrum (8,627); Logan, UT
12/31/2014; 7:00 pm	San Jose State	W 61–33	8–5 (1–0)	Smith Spectrum (8,491); Logan, UT
01/03/2015; 12:00 pm, RTRM	at Boise State	W 62–61	9–5 (2–0)	Taco Bell Arena (5,415); Boise, ID
01/07/2015; 9:00 pm, RTRM	at Fresno State	L 52–61	9–6 (2–1)	Save Mart Center (5,591); Fresno, CA
01/10/2015; 7:00 pm, ESPN3	New Mexico	L 60–66	9–7 (2–2)	Smith Spectrum (9,898); Logan, UT
01/17/2015; 4:00 pm, RTRM	Air Force	W 71–59	10–7 (3–2)	Smith Spectrum (9,885); Logan, UT
01/20/2015; 8:00 pm	at Nevada	W 70–54	11–7 (4–2)	Lawlor Events Center (5,318); Reno, NV
01/24/2015; 6:00 pm, CBSSN	at UNLV	L 77–79 ^{OT}	11–8 (4–3)	Thomas & Mack Center (11,975); Paradise, NV
01/27/2015; 7:00 pm, RTRM	Wyoming	W 56–44	12–8 (5–3)	Smith Spectrum (9,744); Logan, UT
01/31/2015; 6:00 pm, CBSSN	at San Diego State	L 42–62	12–9 (5–4)	Viejas Arena (12,414); San Diego, CA
02/04/2015; 7:30 pm, CBSSN	Boise State	L 63–68	12–10 (5–5)	Smith Spectrum (9,378); Logan, UT
02/07/2015; 4:00 pm, RTRM	at New Mexico	W 63–60	13–10 (6–5)	The Pit (15,111); Albuquerque, NM
02/11/2015; 7:00 pm, RTRM	Nevada	W 75–62	14–10 (7–5)	Smith Spectrum (9,472); Logan, UT
02/18/2015; 8:00 pm, RTRM	at San Jose State	W 76–54	15–10 (8–5)	Event Center Arena (1,311); San Jose, CA
02/21/2015; 7:00 pm, ESPN3	Fresno State	W 85–79	16–10 (9–5)	Smith Spectrum (10,218); Logan, UT
02/24/2015; 7:30 pm, CBSSN	UNLV	W 83–65	17–10 (10–5)	Smith Spectrum (9,503); Logan, UT
02/28/2015; 12:00 pm, RTRM	at Air Force	W 74–60	18–10 (11–5)	Clune Arena (3,072); Colorado Springs, CO
03/04/2015; 7:00 pm	at Wyoming	L 53–76	18–11 (11–6)	Arena-Auditorium (6,327); Laramie, WY
03/07/2015; 7:00 pm, RTRM	Colorado State	L 70–75	18–12 (11–7)	Smith Spectrum (10,270); Logan, UT
Mountain West tournament
03/12/2015; 3:30 pm, CBSSN	vs. Wyoming; Quarterfinals	L 65–67	18–13	Thomas & Mack Center (7,308); Paradise, NV
*Non-conference game. ^{#}Rankings from AP Poll / Coaches' Poll. (#) Tournament seedings in parentheses. All times are in Mountain.

== See also ==
- 2014–15 Utah State Aggies women's basketball team
