= Larry Shyatt =

American basketball coach (born 1951)

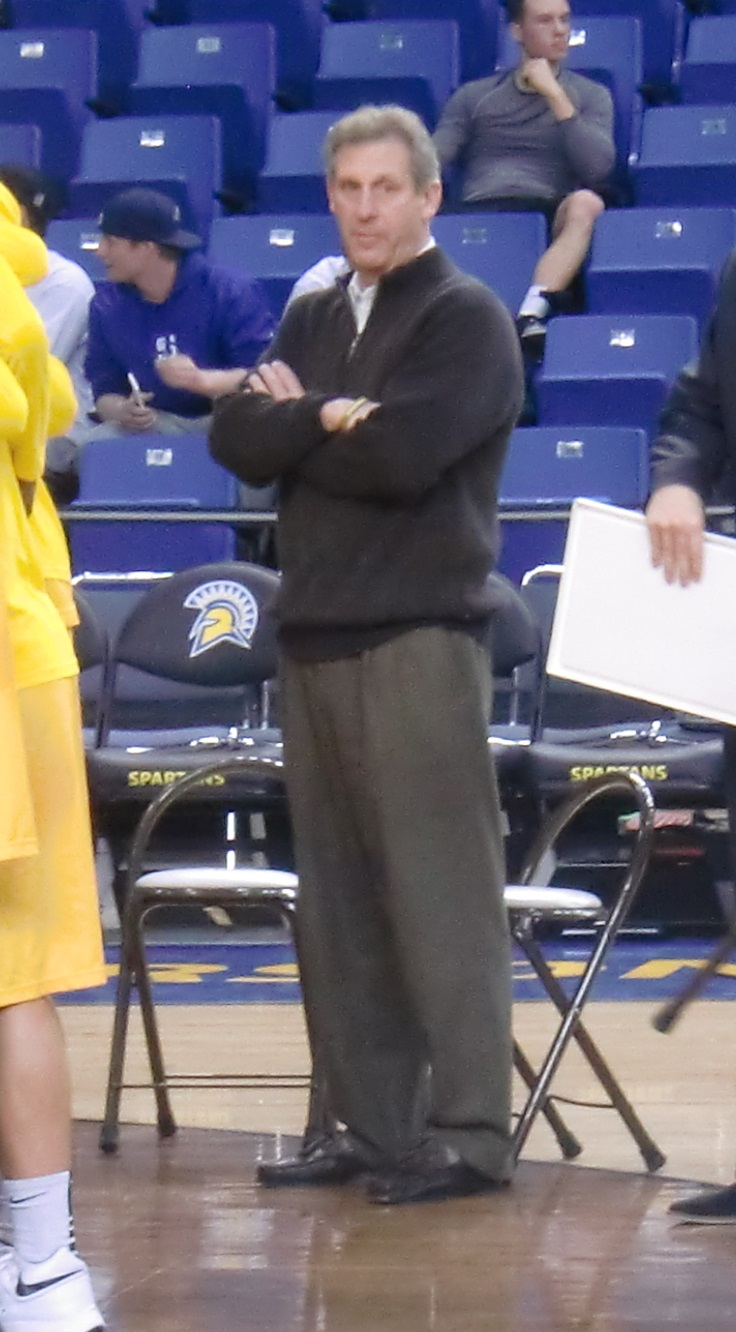
- Shyatt in 2016 at the Event Center Arena at San Jose State University

Biographical details
- Born: April 8, 1951 (age 74); Cleveland, Ohio, U.S.

Playing career
- 1970–1972: Wooster

Coaching career (HC unless noted)
- 1973–1975: Akron (assistant)
- 1975–1976: Utah (assistant)
- 1976–1982: Cleveland State (assistant)
- 1982–1988: New Mexico (assistant)
- 1988–1994: Providence (assistant)
- 1994–1997: Clemson (assistant)
- 1997–1998: Wyoming
- 1998–2003: Clemson
- 2004–2011: Florida (assistant)
- 2011–2016: Wyoming
- 2016–2019: Dallas Mavericks (assistant)

Head coaching record
- Overall: 187–162 (.536)
- Tournaments: 0–1 (NCAA Division I); 4–2 (NIT)

Accomplishments and honors

Championships
- MWC tournament (2015)

Awards
- WAC Co-Coach of the Year (1998)

Lawrence Alan Shyatt (born April 8, 1951) is an American basketball coach. He last served as an assistant coach of the Dallas Mavericks of the National Basketball Association (NBA).

Shyatt was previously head coach at the University of Wyoming in the 1997–98 season, the head coach at Clemson University from 1998 to 2003 and again head coach of Wyoming from 2011 to 2016. He also previously served as an assistant coach at the University of Florida. He was the 1998 National Association of Basketball Coaches (NABC) District 13 Coach of the Year as head coach at Wyoming, the 1998 Western Athletic Conference Mountain Division Coach of the Year, and was named four times as the Top Assistant Coach in the Nation by the Basketball Times.

== Early and personal life, and education ==
Shyatt is a native of Cleveland, Ohio, and is Jewish. His parents were George and Doris (née Swirsky) Shyatt. He played high school basketball at Cleveland Heights High School, and graduated in 1969.

He played basketball for the College of Wooster from 1970 to 1972. Shyatt graduated from the Wooster in 1973, with a bachelor's degree in physical education. He then graduated from the University of Akron in 1975, with a master's in secondary education.

He and his wife Pam have three sons; Jeremy, Geoffrey, and Philip.

== College coaching career ==
From 1973 to 1997, Shyatt served as an assistant coach for multiple college programs. He was named the top assistant coach in the country four times by Basketball Times.

Shyatt was hired as the 18th head coach of the Wyoming Cowboys in 1997, going 19–9 and making the 1998 National Invitation Tournament (NIT). He was named the Western Athletic Conference Mountain Division Coach of the Year in 1998, and the National Association of Basketball Coaches (NABC) District 13 Coach of Year.

The next season, Shyatt took the head coaching job for the Clemson Tigers, and was the coach from 1998 to 2003. His first season as head coach of the Tigers, he led them to a 20-win season (20–15), becoming only the fourth first-year coach in Atlantic Coast Conference (ACC) history to lead his team to a 20-win season. He had a record of 70–84, and made the NIT championship once.

In 2004, Shyatt took an assistant coaching job at the University of Florida Gators, winning the 2006 and 2007 NCAA National Championships. During his seven seasons at the University of Florida, the team was 191–63 (.752), the best record in the SEC during that time, and averaged 27 wins a season.

In 2011, he returned to Wyoming, signing for a base salary of $190,000 and a total compensation package that could reach $645,000 a year. Shyatt reached his first NCAA Tournament as a head coach in the 2014–15 season. On March 21, 2016, Shyatt resigned as head coach of the Cowboys after six seasons.

== NBA ==
On July 1, 2016, the Dallas Mavericks announced Shyatt would join their coaching staff as an assistant, with a primary focus of working with the big men on the roster. On June 18, 2018, the Mavericks announced Shyatt would be moving from behind the bench to replace Kaleb Canales, who had taken an assistant coaching job with the New York Knicks.

== Head coaching record ==
=== College ===
Statistics overview
Season	Team	Overall	Conference	Standing	Postseason
Wyoming Cowboys (Western Athletic Conference) (1997–1998)
1997–98	Wyoming	19–9	9–5	5th	NIT First Round
Clemson Tigers (Atlantic Coast Conference) (1998–2003)
1998–99	Clemson	20–15	5–11	7th	NIT Runner-up
1999–00	Clemson	10–20	4–12	9th	
2000–01	Clemson	12–19	2–14	9th	
2001–02	Clemson	13–17	4–12	9th	
2002–03	Clemson	15–13	5–11	8th	
Clemson:		70–84 (.455)	20–60 (.250)		
Wyoming Cowboys (Mountain West Conference) (2011–2016)
2011–12	Wyoming	21–12	6–8	6th	CBI Quarterfinal
2012–13	Wyoming	20–14	4–12	8th	CBI Quarterfinal
2013–14	Wyoming	18–15	9–9	6th	CBI First Round
2014–15	Wyoming	25–10	11–7	T–4th	NCAA Division I Round of 64
2015–16	Wyoming	14–18	7–11	T–8th	
Wyoming:		117–78 (.600)	46–52 (.469)		
Total:		187–162 (.536)			
National champion Postseason invitational champion Conference regular season champion Conference regular season and conference tournament champion Division regular season champion Division regular season and conference tournament champion Conference tournament champion
