= 2014–15 Colorado State Rams men's basketball team =

American college basketball season

2014–15 Colorado State Rams men's basketball
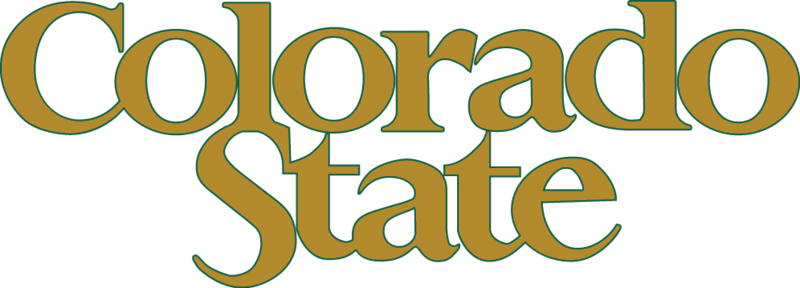

Great Alaska Shootout champions

NIT, First round
- Conference: Mountain West Conference
- Record: 27–7 (13–5 Mountain West)
- Head coach: Larry Eustachy (3rd season)
- Assistant coaches: Leonard Perry; Ross Hodge; Steve Barnes
- Home arena: Moby Arena

2014–15 Mountain West Conference men's basketball standings
	Conf.				Overall
Team	W		L	PCT	W		L	PCT
Boise State	14	–	4	.778	25	–	9	.735
San Diego State	14	–	4	.778	27	–	9	.750
Colorado State	13	–	5	.722	27	–	7	.794
Wyoming †	11	–	7	.611	25	–	10	.714
Utah State	11	–	7	.611	18	–	13	.581
Fresno State	10	–	8	.556	15	–	17	.469
UNLV	8	–	10	.444	18	–	15	.545
New Mexico	7	–	11	.389	15	–	16	.484
Air Force	6	–	12	.333	14	–	17	.452
Nevada	5	–	13	.278	9	–	22	.290
San Jose State*	0	–	18	.000	2	–	28	.067
† 2015 MWC tournament winner *Ineligible for postseason play due to APR penalties

The 2014–15 Colorado State Rams men's basketball team represented Colorado State University during the 2014–15 NCAA Division I men's basketball season. The team was coached by Larry Eustachy in his third season. They played their home games at the Moby Arena on Colorado State University's main campus in Fort Collins, Colorado and were members of the Mountain West Conference. They finished the season 27–7, 13–5 in Mountain West play to finish in third place. They advanced to the semifinals of the Mountain West tournament, where they lost to San Diego State. They were invited to the National Invitation Tournament, where they lost in the first round to South Dakota State.

== Previous season ==
The Rams finished the season with an overall record of 16–16, 7–11 in Mountain West play to finish in a tie for eighth place. They lost in the first round of the Mountain West Conference tournament to Utah State.

== Departures ==
Name	Number	Pos.	Height	Weight	Year	Hometown	Reason for departure
Jesse Carr	11	G	6'2"	184	GS senior	Ainsworth, NE	Retired from basketball due to a knee injury
Jordan Mason	14	G	6'2"	175	Sophomore	Ennis, TX	Transferred to Cal State Fullerton
Gerson Santo	15	F	6'9"	210	Senior	Valencia, Brazil	Graduated
Dwight Smith	33	G	6'4"	185	RS junior	Omaha, NE	Graduate transferred to Northern Colorado
David Cohn	34	G	6'2"	170	Freshman	Elmhurst, IL	Transferred to William & Mary

=== Incoming transfers ===
Name	Number	Pos.	Height	Weight	Year	Hometown	Previous school
Atwan Scott	1	G	6'1"	180	RS senior	Dallas, TX	Transferred from Grambling State.
Gian Clavell	3	G	6'3"	185	Junior	Caguas, PR	Northwest Kansas Technical College
Daniel Mulamba	23	F	6'8"	245	Junior	Kinshasa, DR Congo	Southwestern Christian College

== Recruiting ==
College recruiting
Name	Hometown	School	Height	Weight	Commit date
Jeremiah Paige; SG	Aurora, CO	Rangeview High School	6 ft 4 in (1.93 m)	165 lb (75 kg)	Jun 13, 2013
Jeremiah Paige; SG	Recruit ratings: Scout: Rivals: (70)				
Toby Van Ry; PF	Fort Collins, CO	Fort Collins High School	6 ft 9 in (2.06 m)	170 lb (77 kg)	Nov 9, 2013
Toby Van Ry; PF	Recruit ratings: Scout: Rivals: (70)				
Nathan Bain; SF	Bel Aire, Kansas	Sunrise Christian Academy	6 ft 5 in (1.96 m)	190 lb (86 kg)	Nov 10, 2013
Nathan Bain; SF	Recruit ratings: Scout: Rivals: (N/A)				
Overall recruit ranking: Scout: – Rivals: –
Note: In many cases, Scout, Rivals, 247Sports, On3, and ESPN may conflict in their listings of height and weight.; In these cases, the average was taken. ESPN grades are on a 100-point scale.; Sources: "Colorado State Commit List for 2014". Rivals.; "Men's Basketball Recruiting". Scout.; "ESPN – Colorado State Rams Basketball Recruiting 2014". ESPN.; "Scout.com Team Recruiting Rankings". Scout.; "2014 Team Ranking". Rivals.

== Roster ==
2014–15 Colorado State Rams men's basketball team
Players
Coaches

Pos.	#	Name	Height	Weight	Year	Previous school	Hometown
G	1	Antwan Scott	6 ft 2 in (1.88 m)	178 lb (81 kg)	RS Sr	Grambling State	Wylie, TX
G	2	Daniel Bejarano	6 ft 5 in (1.96 m)	210 lb (95 kg)	RS Sr	Arizona	Phoenix, AZ
G	3	Gian Clavell	6 ft 4 in (1.93 m)	185 lb (84 kg)	Jr	Northwest Kansas Tech Coll.	Caguas, PR
G	4	John Gillon	6 ft 0 in (1.83 m)	168 lb (76 kg)	RS So	Arkansas-Little Rock	Houston, TX
G	5	Fred Richardson III	6 ft 7 in (2.01 m)	212 lb (96 kg)	Jr	Lee College	Houston, TX
G	10	Joe De Ciman	6 ft 6 in (1.98 m)	201 lb (91 kg)	Jr	Dr. Martin LeBoldus HS	Regina, SK
F	11	Stanton Kidd	6 ft 7 in (2.01 m)	225 lb (102 kg)	RS Sr	North Carolina Central	Baltimore, MD
G	12	Carlton Hurst	6 ft 3 in (1.91 m)	190 lb (86 kg)	So	Aurora Central HS	Aurora, CO
G	13	Mike Burnett	6 ft 2 in (1.88 m)	175 lb (79 kg)	RS Jr	Manuel HS	Denver, CO
F	15	Tiel Daniels	6 ft 7 in (2.01 m)	235 lb (107 kg)	RS Jr	Southern Illinois	Wentzville, MO
G	22	Jeremiah Page	6 ft 3 in (1.91 m)	166 lb (75 kg)	Fr	Rangeview HS	Aurora, CO
F	23	Daniel Mulamba	6 ft 9 in (2.06 m)	230 lb (104 kg)	Jr	Southwestern Christian College	Terrell, TX
F/C	30	Marcus Holt	6 ft 10 in (2.08 m)	204 lb (93 kg)	Sr	Paris JC	Aurora, CO
F	31	J. J. Avila	6 ft 8 in (2.03 m)	250 lb (113 kg)	RS Sr	Navy	McAllen, TX
F	41	Toby Van Ry	6 ft 10 in (2.08 m)	196 lb (89 kg)	Fr	Fort Collins HS	Fort Collins, CO

Head coach

- Larry Eustachy (Long Beach State)

Assistant coach(es)

- Leonard Perry (Idaho)
- Ross Hodge (East Texas A&M)
- Steve Barnes (Azusa Pacific)

Legend

- (C) Team captain
- (S) Suspended
- (I) Ineligible
- (W) Walk-on
- Injured
- Current redshirt

Roster

== Schedule and results ==
Date time, TV	Rank^{#}	Opponent^{#}	Result	Record	Site (attendance) city, state
Exhibition
11/10/2014*; 7:00 pm		Fort Lewis	W 85–54		Moby Arena (2,785); Fort Collins, CO
Non-conference regular season
11/15/2014*; 8:00 pm, RTRM		Montana	W 83–66	1–0	Moby Arena (3,602); Fort Collins, CO
11/21/2014*; 7:00 pm		Georgia State	W 80–70	2–0	Moby Arena (3,056); Fort Collins, CO
11/23/2014*; 6:00 pm		Mercer; Great Alaska Shootout opening round	W 75–62	3–0	Moby Arena (2,675); Fort Collins, CO
11/26/2014*; 12:00 am, CBSSN		vs. Missouri State; Great Alaska Shootout quarterfinals	W 76–61	4–0	Alaska Airlines Center (3,233); Anchorage, AK
11/28/2014*; 8:30 pm, CBSSN		vs. Pacific; Great Alaska Shootout semifinals	W 75–64	5–0	Alaska Airlines Center (2,903); Anchorage, AK
11/29/2014*; 9:30 pm, CBSSN		vs. UC Santa Barbara; Great Alaska Shootout championship	W 65–63	6–0	Alaska Airlines Center (3,363); Anchorage, AK
12/03/2014*; 7:00 pm, RTRM		UTEP	W 65–62	7–0	Moby Arena (3,480); Fort Collins, CO
12/07/2014*; 12:00 pm, RTRM		Northern Colorado; Rivalry	W 66–58	8–0	Moby Arena (3,043); Fort Collins, CO
12/10/2014*; 7:00 pm, P12N		at Colorado; Rivalry	W 62–60	9–0	Coors Events Center (10,966); Boulder, CO
12/13/2014*; 2:00 pm		Arkansas–Fort Smith	W 88–60	10–0	Moby Arena (3,126); Fort Collins, CO
12/19/2014*; 7:00 pm, RTRM		at Denver; Rivalry	W 85–84	11–0	Magness Arena (4,111); Denver, CO
12/22/2014*; 6:00 pm	No. 24	Charleston Southern	W 75–54	12–0	Moby Arena (3,392); Fort Collins, CO
12/27/2014*; 7:00 pm	No. 24	at New Mexico State	W 58–57 ^{OT}	13–0	Pan American Center (5,589); Las Cauces, NM
Mountain West regular season
12/31/2014; 7:00 pm, RTRM	No. 24	Boise State	W 71–65	14–0 (1–0)	Moby Arena (5,115); Fort Collins, CO
01/03/2015; 6:00 pm, CBSSN	No. 24	at New Mexico	L 53–66	14–1 (1–1)	The Pit (15,225); Albuquerque, NM
01/07/2015; 7:00 pm		Wyoming; Border War	L 54–60	14–2 (1–2)	Moby Arena (8,018); Fort Collins, CO
01/10/2015; 12:00 pm, RTRM		at Air Force; Rivalry	W 92–87	15–2 (2–2)	Clune Arena (3,019); Colorado Springs, CO
01/14/2015; 7:00 pm		Nevada	W 98–42	16–2 (3–2)	Moby Arena (3,667); Fort Collins, CO
01/17/2015; 8:00 pm		at San Jose State	W 70–41	17–2 (4–2)	Event Center Arena (1,226); San Jose, CA
01/24/2015; 8:00 pm, ESPNU		San Diego State	W 79–73	18–2 (5–2)	Moby Arena (8,745); Fort Collins, CO
01/27/2015; 9:00 pm, ESPNU		at Boise State	L 78–82	18–3 (5–3)	Taco Bell Arena (5,682); Boise, ID
01/31/2015; 4:00 pm, CBSSN		Fresno State	W 80–57	19–3 (6–3)	Moby Arena (7,043); Fort Collins, CO
02/04/2015; 7:00 pm		at Wyoming; Border War	L 48–59	19–4 (6–4)	Arena-Auditorium (8,762); Laramie, WY
02/07/2015; 2:00 pm, CBSSN		UNLV	W 83–82	20–4 (7–4)	Moby Arena (7,113); Fort Collins, CO
02/10/2015; 9:00 pm, ESPNU		New Mexico	W 70–59	21–4 (8–4)	Moby Arena (5,812); Fort Collins, CO
02/14/2015; 6:00 pm, CBSSN		at San Diego State	L 63–72	21–5 (8–5)	Viejas Arena (12,414); San Diego, CA
02/18/2015; 8:00 pm, ESPN3		at Fresno State	W 81–73	22–5 (9–5)	Save Mart Center (5,610); Fresno, CA
02/21/2015; 4:00 pm, RTRM		Air Force; Rivalry	W 66–53	23–5 (10–5)	Moby Arena (6,312); Fort Collins, CO
02/25/2015; 7:00 pm		San Jose State	W 72–56	24–5 (11–5)	Moby Arena (4,924); Fort Collins, CO
03/04/2015; 8:00 pm		at Nevada	W 78–62	25–5 (12–5)	Lawlor Events Center (5,909); Reno, NV
03/07/2015; 7:00 pm, RTRM		at Utah State; Rivalry	W 75–70	26–5 (13–5)	Smith Spectrum (10,270); Logan, UT
Mountain West tournament
03/12/2015; 9:30 pm, CBSSN	(3)	vs. (6) Fresno State; Quarterfinals	W 71–59	27–5	Thomas & Mack Center (8,655); Paradise, NV
03/13/2015; 9:30 pm, CBSSN	(3)	vs. (2) San Diego State; Semifinals	L 43–56	27–6	Thomas & Mack Center (9,199); Paradise, NV
NIT
03/18/2015*; 8:00 pm, ESPNU	(1)	(8) South Dakota State; First round	L 76–86	27–7	Moby Arena (3,391); Fort Collins, CO
*Non-conference game. ^{#}Rankings from AP Poll. (#) Tournament seedings in parentheses. All times are in Mountain Time. (#) during NIT is seed within region.

== Rankings ==
Ranking movement Legend: ██ Increase in ranking. ██ Decrease in ranking. (RV) Received votes but unranked. (NR) Not ranked.
Poll	Pre	Wk 2	Wk 3	Wk 4	Wk 5	Wk 6	Wk 7	Wk 8	Wk 9	Wk 10	Wk 11	Wk 12	Wk 13	Wk 14	Wk 15	Wk 16	Wk 17	Wk 18	Wk 19	Final
AP	NR	NR	NR	NR	RV	RV	24	24	RV	RV	RV	RV	RV	NR	NR	NR	RV	NR	RV	N/A
Coaches	NR	NR	NR	NR	RV	RV	25	24	RV	RV	RV	24	RV	RV	RV	RV	RV	NR	NR	NR

== See also ==
- 2014–15 Colorado State Rams women's basketball team
