= 2014–15 Air Force Falcons men's basketball team =

American college basketball season

2014–15 Air Force Falcons men's basketball
- Conference: Mountain West Conference
- Record: 14–17 (6–12 Mountain West)
- Head coach: Dave Pilipovich (3rd season)
- Assistant coaches: Kurt Kanaskie; Andy Moore; Tyson Wright; Nate Zandt
- Home arena: Clune Arena

2014–15 Mountain West Conference men's basketball standings
	Conf.				Overall
Team	W		L	PCT	W		L	PCT
Boise State	14	–	4	.778	25	–	9	.735
San Diego State	14	–	4	.778	27	–	9	.750
Colorado State	13	–	5	.722	27	–	7	.794
Wyoming †	11	–	7	.611	25	–	10	.714
Utah State	11	–	7	.611	18	–	13	.581
Fresno State	10	–	8	.556	15	–	17	.469
UNLV	8	–	10	.444	18	–	15	.545
New Mexico	7	–	11	.389	15	–	16	.484
Air Force	6	–	12	.333	14	–	17	.452
Nevada	5	–	13	.278	9	–	22	.290
San Jose State*	0	–	18	.000	2	–	28	.067
† 2015 MWC tournament winner *Ineligible for postseason play due to APR penalties

The 2014–15 Air Force Falcons men's basketball team represented the United States Air Force Academy during the 2014–15 NCAA Division I men's basketball season. The Falcons, led by third-year head coach Dave Pilipovich, played their home games at Clune Arena on the Air Force Academy's main campus in Colorado Springs, Colorado. They finished the season 14–17 with a 6–12 record in Mountain West play, finishing in ninth place. They defeated New Mexico to advance to the quarterfinals of the Mountain West basketball tournament where they lost to Boise State.

== Previous season ==
The Falcons finished the season 12–18, 6–12 in Mountain West play to finish in tenth place. They lost in the first round of the Mountain West basketball tournament to Fresno State.

== Departures ==
Name	Number	Pos.	Height	Weight	Year	Hometown	Notes
Tre Coggins	1	G	6'2"	185	Sophomore	San Juan Capistrano, CA	Transferred
Scott Adler	12	G	6'4"	190	Junior	Las Cruces, NM	Left the program
Callum Long	30	G	6'5"	190	Freshman	Flagstaff, AZ	Left the program
Austin Flues	33	F	6'8"	205	Freshman	Aloha, OR	Left the program
Eric Lewis	40	F	6'7"	225	Freshman	Scottsdale, AZ	Left the program
Chase Kammerer	44	F	6'7"	245	Senior	Montgomery, TX	Graduated
Darrius Parker	45	C	6'7"	215	Freshman	Allen, TX	Transferred

== Recruiting ==
College recruiting
Name	Hometown	School	Height	Weight	Commit date
Ben Perez; SG	San Marcos, CA	San Marcos High School	6 ft 3 in (1.91 m)	170 lb (77 kg)	Mar 19, 2014
Ben Perez; SG	Recruit ratings: Scout: Rivals: (67)				
Dane Norman; SG	San Diego, CA	Foothills Christian High School	6 ft 7 in (2.01 m)	175 lb (79 kg)	Mar 8, 2014
Dane Norman; SG	Recruit ratings: Scout: Rivals: (67)				
Dylan Clark; SG	Colorado Springs, CO	Sand Creek	6 ft 1 in (1.85 m)	175 lb (79 kg)	Jun 27, 2013
Dylan Clark; SG	Recruit ratings: Scout: Rivals: (59)				
Ryan Manning; PF	Sacramento, CA	Air Force Academy Prep School	6 ft 5 in (1.96 m)	190 lb (86 kg)	May 2, 2013
Ryan Manning; PF	Recruit ratings: Scout: Rivals: (POST)				
Jacob Van; PG	Mansfield, TX	Lake Ridge High School	6 ft 2 in (1.88 m)	N/A	Sep 19, 2013
Jacob Van; PG	Recruit ratings: Scout: Rivals: (N/A)				
Joe Schneider; PG	Lansing, KS	Lansing High School	6 ft 1 in (1.85 m)	173 lb (78 kg)	Oct 9, 2013
Joe Schneider; PG	Recruit ratings: Scout: Rivals: (N/A)				
Pervis Louder; SG	Raleigh, NC	Village Christian Academy	6 ft 3 in (1.91 m)	170 lb (77 kg)	Mar 2, 2014
Pervis Louder; SG	Recruit ratings: Scout: Rivals: (N/A)				
Grant Leach; SG	Fishers, IN	Hamilton Southeastern High School	6 ft 4 in (1.93 m)	N/A	Apr 13, 2014
Grant Leach; SG	Recruit ratings: Scout: Rivals: (N/A)				
Grant Townsend; PF	Valrico, FL	Bloomingdale Senior High School	6 ft 8 in (2.03 m)	200 lb (91 kg)	Apr 30, 2014
Grant Townsend; PF	Recruit ratings: Scout: Rivals: (N/A)				
Danny Hummer; PG	Columbus, OH	Upper Arlington High School	6 ft 0 in (1.83 m)	175 lb (79 kg)	May 1, 2014
Danny Hummer; PG	Recruit ratings: Scout: Rivals: (N/A)				
Tristan Owens; SG	Orlando, FL	University High School	6 ft 4 in (1.93 m)	180 lb (82 kg)	May 5, 2014
Tristan Owens; SG	Recruit ratings: Scout: Rivals: (N/A)				
Overall recruit ranking: Scout: – Rivals: –
Note: In many cases, Scout, Rivals, 247Sports, On3, and ESPN may conflict in their listings of height and weight.; In these cases, the average was taken. ESPN grades are on a 100-point scale.; Sources: "2014 Team Ranking". Rivals.

== Roster ==
2014–15 Air Force Falcons men's basketball team
Players
Coaches

Pos.	#	Name	Height	Weight	Year	Previous school	Hometown
F	0	Marek Olesinski	6 ft 9 in (2.06 m)	220 lb (100 kg)	Sr	USAFA Prep School	Roswell, NM
G	2	C. J. Siples	6 ft 3 in (1.91 m)	170 lb (77 kg)	Fr	USAFA Prep School	Cibolo, TX
G	3	Justin Hammonds	6 ft 6 in (1.98 m)	205 lb (93 kg)	Sr	Richland	Houston, TX
F	4	Kamryn Williams	6 ft 4 in (1.93 m)	193 lb (88 kg)	Sr	USAFA Prep School	Colorado Springs, CO
G	5	Zach Kocur	6 ft 3 in (1.91 m)	195 lb (88 kg)	So	USAFA Prep School	Denver, CO
F	10	Nick Jorgensen	6 ft 6 in (1.98 m)	208 lb (94 kg)	So	USAFA Prep School	Minnetonka, MN
F	11	Joe Tuss	6 ft 8 in (2.03 m)	200 lb (91 kg)	So	USAFA Prep School	Las Vegas, NV
G	13	Matt Mooney	6 ft 3 in (1.91 m)	200 lb (91 kg)	Fr	USAFA Prep School	Chicago, IL
F	14	Jacob McGraw	6 ft 6 in (1.98 m)	207 lb (94 kg)	Fr	USAFA Prep School	Portland, OR
G	15	Jacob Van	6 ft 2 in (1.88 m)	185 lb (84 kg)	Fr	Mansfield Lake Ridge	Mansfield, TX
G	20	Trevor Lyons	6 ft 3 in (1.91 m)	190 lb (86 kg)	Fr	USAFA Prep School	Newport News, VA
F	21	DeLovell Earls	6 ft 6 in (1.98 m)	225 lb (102 kg)	Sr	USAFA Prep School	Colorado Springs, CO
G	22	Max Yon	6 ft 4 in (1.93 m)	198 lb (90 kg)	Sr	Ronald Reagan HS	San Antonio, TX
G/F	24	Dezmond James	6 ft 4 in (1.93 m)	215 lb (98 kg)	Fr	USAFA Prep School	Parker, CO
F	25	Kyle Broekhuis	6 ft 7 in (2.01 m)	195 lb (88 kg)	So	USAFA Prep School	Colorado Springs, CO
F	31	Luke Lutes	6 ft 7 in (2.01 m)	205 lb (93 kg)	Fr	Jesuit	Sacramento, CA
F	32	Ryan Manning	6 ft 6 in (1.98 m)	190 lb (86 kg)	Fr	USAFA Prep School	Sacramento, CA
C	33	Frank Toohey	6 ft 7 in (2.01 m)	215 lb (98 kg)	Fr	York Community	Elmhurst, IL
F	35	Hayden Graham	6 ft 5 in (1.96 m)	190 lb (86 kg)	So	USAFA Prep School	Austin, TX
C	40	Brandan Leonard	6 ft 8 in (2.03 m)	235 lb (107 kg)	Fr	USAFA Prep School	Olympia, WA
C	41	Zach Moer	6 ft 11 in (2.11 m)	218 lb (99 kg)	Jr	USAFA Prep School	Dallas, TX
F	42	Ethan Michael	6 ft 8 in (2.03 m)	232 lb (105 kg)	Sr	USAFA Prep School	Toledo, OH

Head coach

- Dave Pilipovich (Thiel)

Assistant coach(es)

- Kurt Kanaskie (La Salle)
- Andy Moore (Muskingum)
- Tyron Wright (Air Force)
- Nate Zandt (Michigan)

Legend

- (C) Team captain
- (S) Suspended
- (I) Ineligible
- (W) Walk-on
- Injured
- Current redshirt

Roster

== Schedule and results ==
Date time, TV	Opponent	Result	Record	Site (attendance) city, state
Exhibition
11/08/2014*; 12:00 pm	Regis	W 66–51		Clune Arena; Colorado Springs, CO
Regular season
11/14/2014*; 6:00 pm	at Army; All-Military Classic semifinals	L 78–84	0–1	Christl Arena (1,597); West Point, NY
11/15/2014*; 3:30 pm	vs. The Citadel; All-Military Classic	W 68–55	1–1	Christl Arena (1,060); West Point, NY
11/19/2014*; 7:00 pm	Colorado Christian	W 70–47	2–1	Clune Arena (1,139); Colorado Springs, CO
11/22/2014*; 2:00 pm	Western State	W 90–60	3–1	Clune Arena (1,241); Colorado Springs, CO
11/25/2014*; 7:00 pm, P12N	at Colorado	L 53–68	3–2	Coors Events Center (9,009); Boulder, CO
11/30/2014*; 1:00 pm, FSSW	at Texas Tech	L 62–63	3–3	United Supermarkets Arena (4,876); Lubbock, TX
12/03/2014*; 7:00 pm	Grambling State	W 59–34	4–3	Clune Arena (1,017); Colorado Springs, CO
12/08/2014*; 7:00 pm	Omaha	W 77–61	5–3	Clune Arena (1,003); Colorado Springs, CO
12/13/2014*; 2:00 pm	Arkansas–Pine Bluff	W 80–47	6–3	Clune Arena (1,561); Colorado Springs, CO
12/20/2014*; 2:00 pm	UC Davis	L 75–81	6–4	Clune Arena (1,585); Colorado Springs, CO
12/22/2014*; 7:00 pm	Jacksonville State	W 66–65 ^{OT}	7–4	Clune Arena (813); Colorado Springs, CO
12/31/2014; 3:00 pm, ESPN3	at San Diego State	L 49–53	7–5 (0–1)	Viejas Arena (12,414); San Diego, CA
01/04/2015; 4:00 pm	at Nevada	L 62–80	7–6 (0–2)	Lawlor Events Center (6,638); Reno, NV
01/07/2015; 7:00 pm	San Jose State	W 78–56	8–6 (1–2)	Clune Arena (971); Colorado Springs, CO
01/10/2015; 12:00 pm, RTRM	Colorado State	L 87–92	8–7 (1–3)	Clune Arena (3,019); Colorado Springs, CO
01/14/2015; 7:00 pm, RTRM	at New Mexico	L 48–60	8–8 (1–4)	The Pit (13,891); Albuquerque, NM
01/17/2015; 4:00 pm, RTRM	at Utah State	L 59–71	8–9 (1–5)	Smith Spectrum (9,885); Logan, UT
01/21/2015; 7:30 pm, CBSSN	San Diego State	L 45–77	8–10 (1–6)	Clune Arena (1,209); Colorado Springs, CO
01/24/2015; 12:00 pm, RTRM	Boise State	L 68–77	8–11 (1–7)	Clune Arena (1,647); Colorado Springs, CO
01/28/2015; 8:00 pm	at San Jose State	W 66–52	9–11 (2–7)	Event Center Arena (2,045); San Jose, CA
01/31/2015; 8:00 pm, ESPN3	at UNLV	L 63–74	9–12 (2–8)	Thomas & Mack Center (13,137); Paradise, NV
02/04/2015; 7:00 pm, RTRM	New Mexico	W 53–49	10–12 (3–8)	Clune Arena (1,631); Colorado Springs, CO
02/07/2015; 12:00 pm, RTRM	Wyoming	W 73–50	11–12 (4–8)	Clune Arena (4,021); Colorado Springs, CO
02/11/2015; 7:00 pm	at Boise State	L 42–67	11–13 (4–9)	Taco Bell Arena (6,778); Boise, ID
02/14/2015; 12:00 pm, ESPN3	UNLV	W 76–75	12–13 (5–9)	Clune Arena (1,702); Colorado Springs, CO
02/21/2015; 4:00 pm, RTRM	at Colorado State	L 53–66	12–14 (5–10)	Moby Arena (6,312); Fort Collins, CO
02/25/2015; 7:00 pm, RTRM	at Nevada	W 75–70	13–14 (6–10)	Clune Arena (1,294); Colorado Springs, CO
02/28/2015; 12:00 pm, RTRM	Utah State	L 60–74	13–15 (6–11)	Clune Arena (3,072); Colorado Springs, CO
03/04/2015; 8:00 pm	at Fresno State	L 66–68	13–16 (6–12)	Save Mart Center (6,341); Fresno, CA
Mountain West tournament
03/12/2015; 12:00 pm, MWN	New Mexico; First round	W 68–61	14–16	Thomas & Mack Center (7,458); Paradise, NV
03/13/2015; 12:00 pm, CBSSN	vs. No. 25 Boise State; Quarterfinals	L 68–80	14–17	Thomas & Mack Center (7,308); Paradise, NV
*Non-conference game. ^{#}Rankings from AP Poll. (#) Tournament seedings in parentheses. All times are in Mountain Time.
