= 2015 Mountain West Conference men's basketball tournament =

- Classification: Division I
- Season: 2014–15
- Teams: 10
- Site: Thomas & Mack Center; Paradise, Nevada
- Champions: Wyoming (1st title)
- Winning coach: Larry Shyatt (1st title)
- MVP: Josh Adams (Wyoming)
- Television: CBSSN, CBS

2014–15 Mountain West Conference men's basketball standings
	Conf.				Overall
Team	W		L	PCT	W		L	PCT
Boise State	14	–	4	.778	25	–	9	.735
San Diego State	14	–	4	.778	27	–	9	.750
Colorado State	13	–	5	.722	27	–	7	.794
Wyoming †	11	–	7	.611	25	–	10	.714
Utah State	11	–	7	.611	18	–	13	.581
Fresno State	10	–	8	.556	15	–	17	.469
UNLV	8	–	10	.444	18	–	15	.545
New Mexico	7	–	11	.389	15	–	16	.484
Air Force	6	–	12	.333	14	–	17	.452
Nevada	5	–	13	.278	9	–	22	.290
San Jose State*	0	–	18	.000	2	–	28	.067
*Ineligible for postseason play due to APR penalties
† 2015 MWC tournament winner

The 2015 Mountain West Conference men's basketball tournament was a tournament played March 11–14 at the Thomas & Mack Center in Las Vegas, Nevada.

== Seeds ==
Teams were seeded by conference record, with a ties broken by record between the tied teams followed by record against the regular-season champion, if necessary. The top six seeds received first round byes.

Seed	School	Conference	Overall	Tiebreaker
1	Boise State	14–4	24–7	2–0 vs. San Diego State
2	San Diego State	14–4	24–7	0–2 vs. Boise State
3	Colorado State	13–5	25–5	
4	Wyoming	11–7	22–9	1–0 vs. Boise State
5	Utah State	11–7	18–12	1–1 vs. Boise State
6	Fresno State	10–8	15–16	
7	UNLV	8–10	17–14	
8	New Mexico	7–11	15–15	
9	Air Force	6–12	13–16	
10	Nevada	5–13	9–21	
N/A	San Jose State	0–18	2–28	Ineligible for post-season

== Schedule ==
Game	Time*	Matchup^{#}	Television	TV announcers	MW Radio announcers
First round – Wednesday, March 11
1	Noon	#8 New Mexico vs. #9 Air Force	MWN	Rich Cellini & Marty Fletcher	Brett Grant & Van Coleman
2	2:30 pm	#7 UNLV vs. #10 Nevada	MWN	Rich Cellini & Marty Fletcher	Brett Grant & Van Coleman
Quarterfinals – Thursday, March 12
3	Noon	#1 Boise State vs. #9 Air Force	CBSSN	Dave Ryan, Bob Wenzel & Evan Washburn	Chad Andrus & Robert Smith
4	2:30 pm	#4 Wyoming vs. #5 Utah State	CBSSN	Dave Ryan, Bob Wenzel & Evan Washburn	Nate Kreckman & Robert Smith
5	6:00 pm	#2 San Diego State vs. #7 UNLV	CBSSN	Andrew Catalon, Steve Lappas & Evan Washburn	Chad Andrus & Marty Fletcher
6	8:30 pm	#3 Colorado State vs. #6 Fresno State	CBSSN	Andrew Catalon, Steve Lappas & Evan Washburn	Nate Kreckman & Marty Fletcher
Semifinals – Friday, March 13
7	6:00 pm	#1 Boise State vs. #4 Wyoming	CBSSN	Andrew Catalon, Steve Lappas & Evan Washburn	Nate Kreckman & Marty Fletcher
8	8:30 pm	#2 San Diego State vs. #3 Colorado State	CBSSN	Andrew Catalon, Steve Lappas & Evan Washburn	Chad Andrus & Marty Fletcher
Championship – Saturday, March 14
10	3:00 pm	#4 Wyoming vs. #2 San Diego State	CBS	Kevin Harlan, Dan Bonner, Reggie Miller & Evan Washburn	Nate Kreckman & Marty Fletcher
*Game times in PT. #-Rankings denote tournament seeding.

== Bracket ==
First round Wednesday, March 11; MWN
8	New Mexico	61
9	Air Force	68
7	UNLV	67
10	Nevada	46

Quarterfinals; Thursday, March 12; CBSSN
1	Boise State	80
9	Air Force	68
4	Wyoming	67
5	Utah State	65
2	San Diego State	67
7	UNLV	64
3	Colorado State	71
6	Fresno State	59

Semifinals; Friday, March 13; CBSSN
1	Boise State	66
4	Wyoming	71*
2	San Diego State	56
3	Colorado State	43

Championship; Saturday, March 14; CBS
4	Wyoming	45
2	San Diego State	43

* denotes an overtime period
