= 2014–15 Fresno State Bulldogs men's basketball team =

American college basketball season

2014–15 Fresno State Bulldogs men's basketball
- Conference: Mountain West Conference
- Record: 15–17 (10–8 Mountain West)
- Head coach: Rodney Terry (4th season)
- Assistant coaches: Michael Schwartz; Byron Jones; Kenton Paulino
- Home arena: Save Mart Center

2014–15 Mountain West Conference men's basketball standings
	Conf.				Overall
Team	W		L	PCT	W		L	PCT
Boise State	14	–	4	.778	25	–	9	.735
San Diego State	14	–	4	.778	27	–	9	.750
Colorado State	13	–	5	.722	27	–	7	.794
Wyoming †	11	–	7	.611	25	–	10	.714
Utah State	11	–	7	.611	18	–	13	.581
Fresno State	10	–	8	.556	15	–	17	.469
UNLV	8	–	10	.444	18	–	15	.545
New Mexico	7	–	11	.389	15	–	16	.484
Air Force	6	–	12	.333	14	–	17	.452
Nevada	5	–	13	.278	9	–	22	.290
San Jose State*	0	–	18	.000	2	–	28	.067
† 2015 MWC tournament winner *Ineligible for postseason play due to APR penalties

The 2014–15 Fresno State Bulldogs men's basketball team represented California State University, Fresno during the 2014–15 NCAA Division I men's basketball season. This was head coach Rodney Terry's fourth season at Fresno State. The Bulldogs played their home games at the Save Mart Center and were members of the Mountain West Conference. They finished the season 15–17, 10–8 in Mountain West play to finish in sixth place. They lost in the quarterfinals of the Mountain West tournament to Colorado State.

== Previous season ==
The 2013–14 Fresno State finished the season with an overall record of 21–15, 9–9 in the Mountain West to finish in a tie for fifth place. In the Mountain West Conference tournament, the Bulldogs were defeated by UNLV quarterfinals. They were invited to the College Basketball Invitational which they won game 1 before losing games 2 and 3 to Siena in the championship game.

== Departures ==
Name	Number	Pos.	Height	Weight	Year	Hometown	Notes
Tyler Johnson	1	G	6'2"	186	Senior	Mountain View, CA	Graduated
Tanner Giddings	5	F/C	6'11"	226	Junior	Windsor, CA	Transferred
Broderick Newbill	25	G/F	6'5"	195	RS Sophomore	Kansas City, MO	Transferred
Allen Huddleston	55	G	6'1"	183	RS Senior	Merced, CA	Graduated

== Recruiting ==
College recruiting information
Name	Hometown	School	Height	Weight	Commit date
Isaiah Bailey; SG	Compton, CA	Compton	6 ft 5 in (1.96 m)	175 lb (79 kg)	Nov 5, 2013
Isaiah Bailey; SG	Recruit ratings: Scout: Rivals: (78)				
Terrell Carter; C	Redondo Beach, CA	Redondo Union	6 ft 8 in (2.03 m)	250 lb (110 kg)	May 3, 2014
Terrell Carter; C	Recruit ratings: Scout: Rivals: (70)				
Eugene Artison; SF	Seattle	Franklin	6 ft 7 in (2.01 m)	185 lb (84 kg)	Nov 2, 2013
Eugene Artison; SF	Recruit ratings: Scout: Rivals: (66)				
Overall recruit ranking: Scout: – Rivals: –
Note: In many cases, Scout, Rivals, 247Sports, On3, and ESPN may conflict in their listings of height and weight.; In these cases, the average was taken. ESPN grades are on a 100-point scale.; Sources: "Fresno State Commit List for 2014". Rivals.; "Men's Basketball Recruiting". Scout.; "ESPN – Fresno State Bulldogs Basketball Recruiting 2014". ESPN.; "Scout.com Team Recruiting Rankings". Scout.; "2014 Team Ranking". Rivals.

== Roster ==
2014–15 Fresno State Bulldogs men's basketball team
Players
Coaches

Pos.	#	Name	Height	Weight	Year	Previous school	Hometown
G	0	Emmanuel Owootoah	5 ft 11 in (1.8 m)	175 lb (79 kg)	So	Cordia HS	Toronto, ON
G	1	Darnell Taylor	6 ft 3 in (1.91 m)	205 lb (93 kg)	Jr	Saddleback College	Los Angeles, CA
F	2	Braeden Anderson	6 ft 9 in (2.06 m)	225 lb (102 kg)	RS So	Wilbraham & Monson Acad.	Okotoks, AB
G	3	Cezar Guerrero	6 ft 1 in (1.85 m)	190 lb (86 kg)	RS Jr	Oklahoma State	Huntington Park, CA
F	4	Karachi Edo	6 ft 6 in (1.98 m)	226 lb (103 kg)	So	Berkner HS	Richardson, TX
F	10	Alex Davis	6 ft 9 in (2.06 m)	205 lb (93 kg)	Sr	Hutchinson CC	Houston, TX
G	13	Blake Williams	6 ft 2 in (1.88 m)	197 lb (89 kg)	RS So	Kennedy HS	Sacramento, CA
G	14	Julien Lewis	6 ft 3 in (1.91 m)	190 lb (86 kg)	RS Jr	Texas	Galveston, TX
G/F	22	Paul Watson	6 ft 7 in (2.01 m)	187 lb (85 kg)	So	Paradise Valley HS	Phoenix, AZ
G	23	Marvelle Harris	6 ft 4 in (1.93 m)	212 lb (96 kg)	Jr	Eisenhower HS	Rialto, CA
G	24	Isaiah Bailey	6 ft 6 in (1.98 m)	190 lb (86 kg)	Fr	Compton HS	Compton, CA
C	34	Terrell Carter II	6 ft 8 in (2.03 m)	265 lb (120 kg)	Fr	Redondo Union HS	Redondo Beach, CA
F	35	Eugene Artison	6 ft 9 in (2.06 m)	235 lb (107 kg)	Fr	Franklin HS	Seattle, WA

Head coach

- Rodney Terry (St. Edward's)

Assistant coach(es)

- Michael Schwartz (Texas)
- Bryon Jones (Central Oklahoma)
- Kenton Paulino (Texas)

Legend

- (C) Team captain
- (S) Suspended
- (I) Ineligible
- (W) Walk-on
- Injured
- Current redshirt

Roster

== Schedule and results ==
Date time, TV	Opponent	Result	Record	Site (attendance) city, state
Exitbition
11/09/2014*; 4:00 pm	UC Santa Cruz	W 77–38	–	Save Mart Center (4,925); Fresno, CA
Regular season
11/14/2014*; 7:00 pm	at Pepperdine	L 74–89	0–1	Firestone Fieldhouse (2,003); Malibu, CA
11/17/2014*; 7:00 pm	Bristol University; Gulf Coast Showcase Opening Round	W 93–55	1–1	Save Mart Center (5,210); Fresno, CA
11/20/2014*; 7:00 pm	at Northern Arizona	L 52–73	1–2	Walkup Skydome (1,674); Flagstaff, AZ
11/24/2014*; 11:30 am	vs. Evansville; Gulf Coast Showcase quarterfinals	L 52–58	1–3	Germain Arena (2,118); Estero, FL
11/25/2014*; 9:00 am	vs. East Carolina; Gulf Coast Showcase consolation round	L 52–58	1–4	Germain Arena (240); Estero, FL
11/26/2014*; 9:00 am	vs. Marist; Gulf Coast Showcase 7th place game	L 64–68	1–5	Germain Arena (271); Estero, FL
11/30/2014*; 3:00 pm, CBSSN	California	L 57–64	1–6	Save Mart Center (5,741); Fresno, CA
12/03/2014*; 7:00 pm	UC Irvine	W 72–63	2–6	Save Mart Center (5,210); Fresno, CA
12/06/2014*; 7:00 pm	at Cal State Bakersfield	W 63–61	3–6	Icardo Center (2,491); Bakersfield, CA
12/10/2014*; 6:00 pm	at Texas Tech	L 56–73	3–7	United Supermarkets Arena (5,530); Lubbock, TX
12/13/2014*; 7:00 pm	Cal Poly	W 63–57	4–7	Save Mart Center (5,372); Fresno, CA
12/20/2014*; 7:00 pm	at Pacific	L 68–71	4–8	Alex G. Spanos Center (2,326); Stockton, CA
12/28/2014*; 1:00 pm	St. Katherine College	W 93–62	5–8	Save Mart Center (5,205); Fresno, CA
12/31/2014; 4:00 pm, ESPN3	at New Mexico	L 64–76	5–9 (0–1)	The Pit (14,478); Albuquerque, NM
01/03/2015; 7:00 pm, ESPNU	San Diego State	L 57–59	6–9 (1–1)	Save Mart Center (5,910); Fresno, CA
01/07/2015; 8:00 pm, RTRM	Utah State	W 61–52	7–9 (2–1)	Save Mart Center (5,591); Fresno, CA
01/10/2015; 3:00 pm	at Nevada	W 69–66	8–9 (3–1)	Lawlor Events Center (5,310); Reno, NV
01/14/2015; 7:00 pm	at San Jose State	W 73–62	9–9 (4–1)	Event Center Arena (1,091); San Jose, CA
01/17/2015; 4:00 pm, ESPN3	No. 25 Wyoming	L 65–70 ^{3OT}	9–10 (4–2)	Save Mart Center (8,118); Fresno, CA
01/24/2015; 4:00 pm, ASN	Nevada	W 66–62	10–10 (5–2)	Save Mart Center (7,945); Fresno, CA
01/27/2015; 6:00 pm, CBSSN	at San Diego State	L 47–58	10–11 (5–3)	Viejas Arena (12,414); San Diego, CA
01/31/2015; 3:00 pm, CBSSN	at Colorado State	L 57–80	10–12 (5–4)	Moby Arena (7,043); Fort Collins, CO
02/04/2015; 7:00 pm	San Jose State	W 81–63	11–12 (6–4)	Save Mart Center (5,550); Fresno, CA
02/10/2015; 7:00 pm, ESPN3	at UNLV	L 61–73	11–13 (6–5)	Thomas & Mack Center (12,384); Paradise, NV
02/14/2015; 4:00 pm, ESPN3	Boise State	W 70–64	12–13 (7–5)	Save Mart Center (6,553); Fresno, CA
02/18/2015; 7:00 pm, ESPN3	Colorado State	L 73–81	12–14 (7–6)	Save Mart Center (5,610); Fresno, CA
02/21/2015; 6:00 pm, ESPN3	at Utah State	L 79–85	12–15 (7–7)	Smith Spectrum (10,218); Logan, UT
02/25/2015; 6:30 pm, CBSSN	at Wyoming	W 64–59	13–15 (8–7)	Arena-Auditorium (5,868); Laramie, WY
02/28/2015; 7:00 pm, ESPNU	New Mexico	W 59–55	14–15 (9–7)	Save Mart Center (8,310); Fresno, CA
03/04/2015; 7:00 pm, MWN	Air Force	W 68–66	15–15 (10–7)	Save Mart Center (6,341); Fresno, CA
03/07/2015; 5:00 pm, ESPN3	at Boise State	L 52–71	15–16 (10–8)	Taco Bell Arena (11,308); Boise, ID
Mountain West tournament
03/12/2015; 8:30 pm, CBSSN	vs. Colorado State; Quarterfinals	L 59–71	15–17	Thomas & Mack Center (8,655); Paradise, NV
*Non-conference game. ^{#}Rankings from AP Poll. (#) Tournament seedings in parentheses. All times are in Pacific Time.
