= 2014–15 San Jose State Spartans men's basketball team =

American college basketball season

2014–15 San Jose State Spartans men's basketball
- Conference: Mountain West Conference
- Record: 2–28 (0–18 MWC)
- Head coach: Dave Wojcik (2nd season)
- Assistant coaches: Chris Brazelton; Mike Lepore; Tyler Ojanen
- Home arena: Event Center Arena

2014–15 Mountain West Conference men's basketball standings
	Conf.				Overall
Team	W		L	PCT	W		L	PCT
Boise State	14	–	4	.778	25	–	9	.735
San Diego State	14	–	4	.778	27	–	9	.750
Colorado State	13	–	5	.722	27	–	7	.794
Wyoming †	11	–	7	.611	25	–	10	.714
Utah State	11	–	7	.611	18	–	13	.581
Fresno State	10	–	8	.556	15	–	17	.469
UNLV	8	–	10	.444	18	–	15	.545
New Mexico	7	–	11	.389	15	–	16	.484
Air Force	6	–	12	.333	14	–	17	.452
Nevada	5	–	13	.278	9	–	22	.290
San Jose State*	0	–	18	.000	2	–	28	.067
† 2015 MWC tournament winner *Ineligible for postseason play due to APR penalties

The 2014–15 San Jose State Spartans men's basketball team represented San José State University during the 2014–15 NCAA Division I men's basketball season. The Spartans, led by second year head coach Dave Wojcik, played their home games at the Event Center Arena and were members of the Mountain West Conference.

Due to APR penalties, San Jose State were ineligible for postseason tournament play, including the Mountain West tournament.

Following a 7–24 season in 2013–14, the Spartans finished the season 2–28, 0–18 in Mountain West play to finish in last place. They failed to defeat a Division I opponent.

== Preseason ==
=== Departures ===
Name	Number	Pos.	Height	Weight	Year	Hometown	Notes
Dylan Alexander	5	G	6'4"	190	Freshman	Stockton, CA	Transferred to Casper CC
D.J. Brown	1	G	6'1"	185	RS Junior	Los Angeles, CA	Graduated; transferred to Texas State
Chris Cunningham	15	F	6'9"	240	Senior	Pomona, CA	Graduated
Mike VanKirk	21	C	7'1"	240	Sophomore	Palmdale, CA	Left the team

=== Recruits ===
College recruiting
Name	Hometown	School	Height	Weight	Commit date
Daryl Gaynor; PG	Las Vegas, NV	Durango High School	6 ft 1 in (1.85 m)	165 lb (75 kg)	Apr 19, 2014
Daryl Gaynor; PG	Recruit ratings: Scout: Rivals: (67)				
Ryan Singer; C	Littleton, CO	Massanutten Military Academy	6 ft 11 in (2.11 m)	220 lb (100 kg)	Apr 26, 2014
Ryan Singer; C	Recruit ratings: Scout: Rivals: (60)				
Leon Bahner; C	Bonn, Germany	CJD Konigswinter	6 ft 11 in (2.11 m)	N/A	May 21, 2014
Leon Bahner; C	Recruit ratings: Scout: Rivals: (N/A)				
Overall recruit ranking: Scout: – Rivals: –
Note: In many cases, Scout, Rivals, 247Sports, On3, and ESPN may conflict in their listings of height and weight.; In these cases, the average was taken. ESPN grades are on a 100-point scale.; Sources: "2014 Team Ranking". Rivals.

=== Incoming transfers ===
Name	Number	Pos.	Height	Weight	Year	Hometown	Notes
Jordan Baker	1	G	6'3"	180	Junior	Tempe, AZ	Transferred from Pepperdine; redshirted last season per NCAA rules.
Ivo Basor	10	F	6'9"	230	Junior	Watsonville, CA	Junior college transfer from Monterey Peninsula.
Princeton Onwas	23	G	6'6"	215	Junior	Houston, TX	Transferred from Utah. Under NCAA transfer rules, Onwas will redshirt this season and will have one year of remaining eligibility.
Frank Rogers	14	F	6'9"	230	Junior	Salinas, CA	Transferred from San Francisco; redshirted last season per NCAA rules.

=== NCAA academic sanctions ===
Under previous head coach George Nessman, San Jose State reported five consecutive years of rising four-year average Academic Progress Rate (APR) scores, including a program-best 940 in the 2011–12 season (because of a perfect one-year 1000 score). However, the APR fell below 930 for the 2012–13 season, Nessman's last as head coach. As a result, the NCAA imposed sanctions on the San Jose State men's basketball program in April 2014. These sanctions included:

- A postseason ban for this season, including from the MWC tournament;
- Replacing four hours of basketball practice with four hours of academic activities;
- One fewer day of basketball-related activities a week.

Athletic director Gene Bleymaier stated in response to the sanctions: "Last year, we were faced with a situation that needed to be dealt with in a major fashion. The coaching staff was not retained, and several players were not invited back for the 2013-14 season. Only four players returned from the 2012-13 team.

== Roster ==
2014–15 San Jose State Spartans men's basketball team
Players
Coaches

Pos.	#	Name	Height	Weight	Year	Previous school	Hometown
G	0	Rashad Muhammad	6 ft 6 in (1.98 m)	170 lb (77 kg)	So	Bishop Gorman HS	Las Vegas, NV
F	2	Jaleel Williams	6 ft 7 in (2.01 m)	220 lb (100 kg)	Sr	Ellison HS	Killeen, TX
F	4	Brandon Mitchell	6 ft 6 in (1.98 m)	215 lb (98 kg)	So	Ridgeway HS	Memphis, TN
G	5	Darryl Gaynor II	6 ft 2 in (1.88 m)	165 lb (75 kg)	Fr	Durango HS	Las Vegas, NV
C	10	Ivo Basor (W)	6 ft 8 in (2.03 m)	240 lb (109 kg)	Jr	Watsonville HS; Monterey Peninsula CC	Watsonville, CA
G	11	Danny Mahoney (W)	6 ft 0 in (1.83 m)	160 lb (73 kg)	Fr	Serra HS	San Mateo, CA
G	21	Jalen James (injured)	6 ft 3 in (1.91 m)	170 lb (77 kg)	So	La Lumiere School	Chicago, IL
G	22	Devante Wilson (injured) (redshirt)	6 ft 4 in (1.93 m)	220 lb (100 kg)	Sr	Muskogee HS; Lee CC	Muskogee, OK
G	23	Princeton Onwas (I) (redshirt)	6 ft 6 in (1.98 m)	215 lb (98 kg)	Jr	Seven Lakes HS; Utah	Houston, TX
F	24	Ryan Singer	6 ft 9 in (2.06 m)	220 lb (100 kg)	Fr	Massanutten Military Academy	Littleton, CO
C	25	Leon Bahner (injured)	6 ft 11 in (2.11 m)	225 lb (102 kg)	Fr	CJD Christophorusschule Königswinter	Bonn, Germany

Head coach

- Dave Wojcik (Loyola)

Assistant coach(es)

- Chris Brazelton (Fresno State)
- Mike Lepore (Wake Forest)
- Tyler Ojanen (California Baptist)

Legend

- (C) Team captain
- (S) Suspended
- (I) Ineligible
- (W) Walk-on
- Injured
- Current redshirt

Roster

=== Suspensions and dismissals ===
Coach Dave Wojcik announced on December 13, 2014 that five players were suspended indefinitely due to violating team rules: Jordan Baker, Rashad Muhammad, Matt Pollard, Frank Rogers, and Jaleel Williams. As a result, two San Jose State football players—wide receiver Tyler Winston and tight end Andrew Vollert—joined the roster temporarily. Vollert and Winston became the first San Jose State football players since the 1988–89 season to have played football and basketball the same season. The last time that happened followed the walkout of 10 basketball players in protest over alleged verbal abuse by coach Bill Berry, who was fired after the season.

Five days after the five players were suspended, associate head coach Chris Brazelton was placed on paid administrative leave. Ultimately, Muhammad and Williams were reinstated on January 3, 2015. Baker and Rogers were dismissed from the team, and Pollard transferred.

=== Injuries ===
On December 3, 2014, Jalen James suffered a season-ending ankle injury. Six days later, Leon Bahner was diagnosed with the same injury and was also sidelined the rest of the season. Devante Wilson did not play at all in the season due to injury.

== Schedule ==
Date time, TV	Opponent	Result	Record	Site (attendance) city, state
Exhibition
11/02/2014*; 4:00 pm	Cal State East Bay	W 84–65		Event Center Arena (1,196); San Jose, CA
11/08/2014*; 1:00 pm	Notre Dame de Namur	W 65–58		Event Center Arena (1,172); San Jose, CA
Regular season
11/14/2014*; 5:00 pm	Bethesda	W 67–44	1–0	Event Center Arena (1,078); San Jose, CA
11/16/2014*; 1:00 pm	Portland	L 68–73 ^{OT}	1–1	Event Center Arena (1,453); San Jose, CA
11/19/2014*; 7:00 pm	Pepperdine	L 44–63	1–2	Event Center Arena (1,358); San Jose, CA
11/22/2014*; 2:00 pm	at Cal State Fullerton	L 66–70	1–3	Titan Gym (1,092); Fullerton, CA
11/27/2014*; 8:00 pm, ESPN2	vs. Washington; Wooden Legacy quarterfinals	L 56–78	1–4	Titan Gym (2,241); Fullerton, CA
11/28/2014*; 6:00 pm, ESPN3	vs. Western Michigan; Wooden Legacy consolation round	L 60–79	1–5	Titan Gym (N/A); Fullerton, CA
11/30/2014*; 4:30 pm, ESPN3	vs. Princeton; Wooden Legacy 7th place game	L 54–69	1–6	Honda Center (N/A); Anaheim, CA
12/03/2014*; 7:00 pm	at UC Davis	L 56–70	1–7	The Pavilion (1,965); Davis, CA
12/06/2014*; 7:00 pm	Santa Clara; Rivalry	L 50–61	1–8	Event Center Arena (2,123); San Jose, CA
12/09/2014*; 7:00 pm	Saint Katherine	W 74–63	2–8	Event Center Arena (1,194); San Jose, CA
12/13/2014*; 7:00 pm	Seattle	L 38–54	2–9	Event Center Arena (1,415); San Jose, CA
12/21/2014*; 4:00 pm, P12N	at Washington State	L 53–82	2–10	Beasley Coliseum (1,604); Pullman, WA
12/31/2014; 6:00 pm	at Utah State	L 33–61	2–11 (0–1)	Smith Spectrum (8,491); Logan, UT
01/03/2015; 7:00 pm	Wyoming	L 59–64	2–12 (0–2)	Event Center Arena (1,188); San Jose, CA
01/07/2015; 6:00 pm	at Air Force	L 56–78	2–13 (0–3)	Clune Arena (971); Colorado Springs, CO
01/10/2015; 7:00 pm	at UNLV	L 40–74	2–14 (0–4)	Thomas & Mack Center (12,623); Paradise, NV
01/14/2015; 7:00 pm	Fresno State; Rivalry	L 62–73	2–15 (0–5)	Event Center Arena (1,091); San Jose, CA
01/17/2015; 7:00 pm	Colorado State	L 41–70	2–16 (0–6)	Event Center Arena (1,226); San Jose, CA
01/21/2015; 7:00 pm, RTRM	at Boise State	L 36–86	2–17 (0–7)	Taco Bell Arena (4,219); Boise, ID
01/28/2015; 7:00 pm	Air Force	L 52–66	2–18 (0–8)	Event Center Arena (2,045); San Jose, CA
01/31/2015; 5:00 pm, RTRM	at New Mexico	L 41–67	2–19 (0–9)	The Pit (14,358); Albuquerque, NM
02/04/2015; 7:00 pm	at Fresno State; Rivalry	L 63–81	2–20 (0–10)	Save Mart Center (5,550); Fresno, CA
02/07/2015; 3:00 pm	Nevada	L 57–60	2–21 (0–11)	Event Center Arena (1,085); San Jose, CA
02/14/2015; 3:00 pm, RTRM	at Wyoming	L 60–77	2–22 (0–12)	Arena-Auditorium (7,870); Laramie, WY
02/18/2015; 7:00 pm, RTRM	Utah State	L 54–76	2–23 (0–13)	Event Center Arena (1,311); San Jose, CA
02/21/2015; 7:00 pm, ESPN3	San Diego State; Rivalry	L 56–74	2–24 (0–14)	Event Center Arena (3,477); San Jose, CA
02/25/2015; 6:00 pm	at Colorado State	L 56–72	2–25 (0–15)	Moby Arena (4,924); Fort Collins, CO
02/28/2015; 7:00 pm	at Nevada	L 51–62	2–26 (0–16)	Lawlor Events Center (5,325); Reno, NV
03/04/2015; 7:00 pm, RTRM	Boise State	L 51–68	2–27 (0–17)	Event Center Arena (1,088); San Jose, CA
03/07/2015; 7:00 pm, ESPN3	UNLV	L 58–71	2–28 (0–18)	Event Center Arena (2,106); San Jose, CA
*Non-conference game. ^{#}Rankings from AP Poll. (#) Tournament seedings in parentheses. All times are in Pacific Time.
