= United States Air Force Academy Preparatory School =

Preparatory school for the United States Air Force Academy

U.S. Air Force Academy Prep School
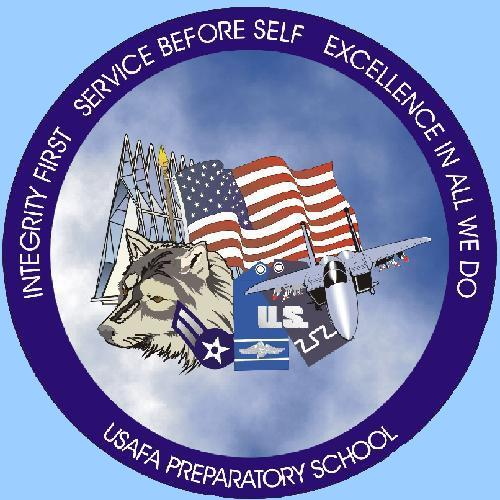
- Motto: 2019 Class Motto; "Take Flight, 23! Storm the Hill!"
- Type: Federal military academy prep school
- Established: May 1961
- Superintendent: Lieutenant General Richard M. Clark
- Commander: Colonel Michael Cornelius
- Administrative staff: 60 faculty
- Undergraduates: approx. 240 cadet candidates
- Location: near Colorado Springs, Colorado, United States; 38°58′45″N 104°51′34″W
- Campus: USAF Academy grounds
- Athletics: 7 varsity teams
- Colors: Midnight blue █, and white █
- Nickname: Huskies
- Website: www.usafa.edu/prep-school/

The U.S. Air Force Academy Preparatory School—usually referred to as "the Prep School" or "The P School"—was established in May 1961. The school's founder and first commander was Colonel Lee Charles Black. It is located on the campus of the United States Air Force Academy near the Community Center. The Prep School's mission is to prepare, motivate, and evaluate for admission to and success at the Air Force Academy. Students at the prep school are referred to as "cadet candidates" or more informally as "preppies."

The prep school has a staff of 57 people and offers a 10-month program of intense academic preparation, military training, and athletic conditioning, designed to develop in cadet candidates the skills and character necessary to be successful at the academy. The academic curriculum is focused on mathematics, English, and sciences.

== Eligibility requirements ==
Prospective cadet candidates must:

- Be at least 17 and not have passed their 22nd birthday by 1 July of the year they enter the Prep School.
- Be eligible to be a U.S. citizen.
- Be unmarried and have no dependents.
- Meet the medical standards for a commission in the United States Air Force.

== Admission and transition to USAFA ==
Like admission to the academy, admission to the Prep School is competitive, with selections made by the academy director of admissions. If a civilian or airman, either Active Duty or Reserve, applies for but does not receive a direct appointment to the Air Force Academy, they will automatically be considered for the Prep School. Air Force enlisted personnel may apply directly to the Prep School via Air Force Form 1786, submitted through the unit commander and MPF. AFI 36-2021 should be consulted for details. Enlisted members from the Army, Navy and Marine Corps are not eligible for nomination but can be considered as civilians.

Approximately 240 cadet candidates enter the Prep School each summer. Civilian selectees are placed on active duty in the Air Force Reserves while attending the Prep School. Successful completion of the Prep School program improves one's chance for an appointment to the academy but does not guarantee it. If not selected, prior enlisted are assigned to other duties, usually their previous AFSC, while previous civilian cadet candidates are discharged from the Reserves with no further obligation to the Air Force.

Between 75 and 80 percent of all entering students earn an appointment to the academy. To qualify for an appointment, students must successfully complete the Prep School programs in academics and military training, pass the Cadet Physical Fitness Test, exhibit strong ethical character, receive a recommendation from a Congressman or the Prep School commander, and be approved by the academy board.

== Organization ==
Like the main Academy, the Prep School is set up as a military unit. Services, engineering, communications, and security are provided by the 10th Air Base Wing.

All cadet candidates are in the group with their own cadet candidate group commander. They are then divided into three squadrons, Alpha, Bravo and Charlie, each having their own Air Officer Commanding (AOC) and an Academy Military Training (AMT) enlisted member. AOCs are generally Majors and/or Captains and are in charge of cadet candidates' training and discipline. The AMT is a noncommissioned officer who supports the AOC and cadet candidates as well as mentoring over the 10-month program. Each squadron also has a cadet candidate squadron commander. Squadrons are further subdivided into three flights consisting of approximately 25 cadet candidates, each with their own cadet candidate commander.

== Academics ==
The academic program is 10 months long and is divided into four quarters. It is highly structured, with all cadet candidates taking the same classes for the first quarter. Each quarter, cadet candidates take classes in math (ranging from advanced algebra to calculus, and including applications in science and engineering), chemistry, physics, and English, as well as a one-time course in basic study skills and advanced reading skills. As at the academy, professors are a mix of civilians and Air Force officers.

During the last quarter, qualified students can take Calculus 141 at the academy instead of taking the Prep School trigonometry and calculus courses. Students will receive Academy credit for the class if they pass the placement exam.

== Military training ==
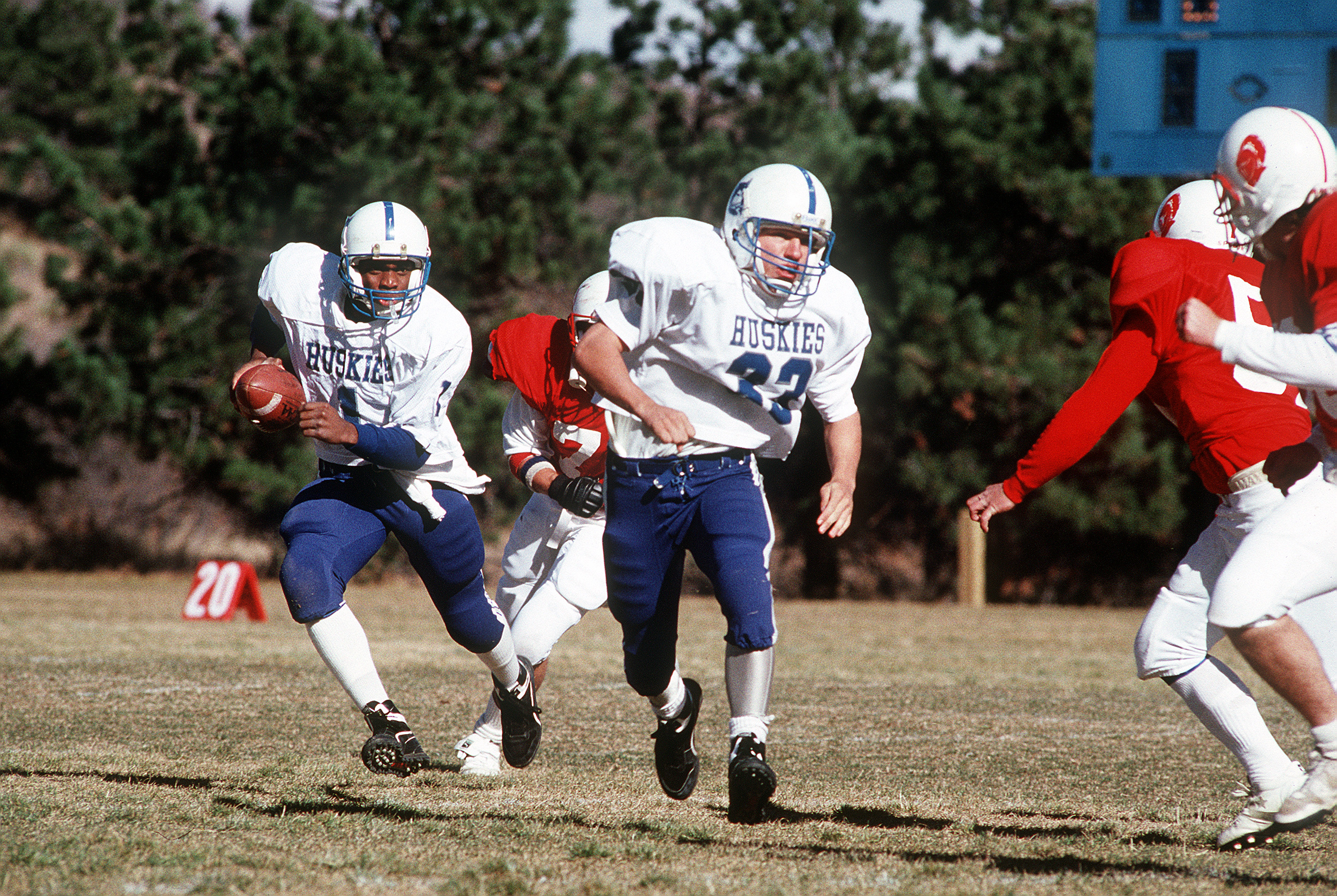
United States Air Force Academy Preparatory School football in 1990

Upon arriving at the Prep School, cadet candidates go through an 18-day course in Basic Military Training (BMT). Training focuses on teaching basic military history, drill and ceremonies, military customs and courtesies, proper uniform wear, and physical fitness.

Throughout the year, military training time is reserved every weekday afternoon following academics, usually lasting about an hour. It is used at the discretion of the Prep School commander, the squadron commanders, or the cadet candidate flight commanders. Activities range from guest speakers, drill or parade practice, to room inspections.

At the end of the school year, cadet candidates go through a three-day high intensity field training exercise (FTX). FTX focuses on teamwork and on utilizing knowledge and leadership experience gained over the previous 10 months.

== Athletics ==
Just like cadets at the academy, all Prep School cadet candidates are required to participate in athletics. The Prep School has a number of varsity sports, including football, men's and women's soccer, and men's and women's basketball. Teams compete against a number of different colleges throughout the state and region. There are also a variety of intramural sports available. Not all athletic time must be spent on organized sports; it may also include weight lifting, running, or another physical activity of the cadet candidates' choosing. The football team usually plays community colleges from the Kansas Jayhawk Community College Conference (KJCCC).

== Graduates ==
Many Prep School graduates have gone on to distinguish themselves in military and academic areas at the academy. Nine Prep School graduates have held the Cadet Wing's top leadership position as cadet wing commander, and Prep School graduates have earned prestigious awards, including the Rhodes Scholarship, Fulbright Scholarship, Order of the Daedalians Scholarship, and the Guggenheim Fellowship. A number of Prep School graduates have gone on to become general officers, Air Force Cross and Silver Star recipients, and astronauts. Other honors earned by Prep School graduates include a White House fellowship, becoming a Thunderbirds pilot and a winner of the coveted Jabara Award.
