= 2014–15 Nevada Wolf Pack men's basketball team =

American college basketball season

2014–15 Nevada Wolf Pack men's basketball
- Conference: Mountain West Conference
- Record: 9–22 (5–13 MW)
- Head coach: David Carter (6th season)
- Assistant coaches: Doug Novsek; Keith Brown; Zac Claus
- Home arena: Lawlor Events Center

2014–15 Mountain West Conference men's basketball standings
	Conf.				Overall
Team	W		L	PCT	W		L	PCT
Boise State	14	–	4	.778	25	–	9	.735
San Diego State	14	–	4	.778	27	–	9	.750
Colorado State	13	–	5	.722	27	–	7	.794
Wyoming †	11	–	7	.611	25	–	10	.714
Utah State	11	–	7	.611	18	–	13	.581
Fresno State	10	–	8	.556	15	–	17	.469
UNLV	8	–	10	.444	18	–	15	.545
New Mexico	7	–	11	.389	15	–	16	.484
Air Force	6	–	12	.333	14	–	17	.452
Nevada	5	–	13	.278	9	–	22	.290
San Jose State*	0	–	18	.000	2	–	28	.067
† 2015 MWC tournament winner *Ineligible for postseason play due to APR penalties

The 2014–15 Nevada Wolf Pack men's basketball team represented the University of Nevada, Reno during the 2014–15 NCAA Division I men's basketball season. The Wolf Pack, led by sixth year head coach David Carter, played their home games at the Lawlor Events Center and were members of the Mountain West Conference. They finished season 9–22, 5–13 in Mountain West play to finish in tenth place. They lost in the first round of the Mountain West tournament to UNLV.

Head coach David Carter was fired about two hours after their season-ending defeat to UNLV. He compiled a record of 98–97 in six seasons.

== Previous season ==
The Wolf Pack finished the season 15–17, 10–8 in Mountain West play to finish in a tie for third place. They lost in the quarterfinals of the Mountain West tournament to Boise State.

== Departures ==
Name	Number	Pos.	Height	Weight	Year	Hometown	Notes
Jerry Evans, Jr.	2	F	6'8"	210	Senior	Lawndale, CA	Graduated
Chris Brown	4	C	6'11"	265	Junior	Houston, TX	Injured
Cole Huff	13	F	6'8"	205	Sophomore	Altadena, CA	Transferred to Creighton
Alioune Cheika Fall	21	F	6'9"	250	Senior	Thies, Senegal	Graduated
Deonte Burton	24	G	6'1"	190	Senior	Los Angeles, CA	Graduated/Went undrafted in the 2014 NBA draft
Richard Bell	41	F	6'9"	215	RS Sophomore	West Sussex, England	Left the team

=== Incoming transfers ===
Name	Number	Pos.	Height	Weight	Year	Hometown	Notes
Tyron Criswell	2	G	6'4"	215	Junior	Omaha, NE	Junior College transfer from Central Community College.
Kaileb Rodriguez	5	F	6'9"	215	Sophomore	Highlands Ranch, CO	Junior College transfer from Sheridan College.

== Recruiting ==
College recruiting information
Name	Hometown	School	Height	Weight	Commit date
Eric Cooper, Jr. SF	Ontario, CA	IMG Academy	6 ft 3 in (1.91 m)	180 lb (82 kg)	Oct 8, 2013
Eric Cooper, Jr. SF	Recruit ratings: Scout: Rivals: (POST)				
Robyn Missa; PF	Brookville, NY	Long Island Lutheran HS	6 ft 9 in (2.06 m)	220 lb (100 kg)	May 6, 2014
Robyn Missa; PF	Recruit ratings: Scout: Rivals: (N/A)				
Elijah Foster; PF	Seattle, WA	Ranch Beach HS	6 ft 7 in (2.01 m)	240 lb (110 kg)	May 10, 2014
Elijah Foster; PF	Recruit ratings: Scout: Rivals: (N/A)				
Overall recruit ranking: Scout: – Rivals: –
Note: In many cases, Scout, Rivals, 247Sports, On3, and ESPN may conflict in their listings of height and weight.; In these cases, the average was taken. ESPN grades are on a 100-point scale.; Sources: "2014 Team Ranking". Rivals.

== Roster ==
2014–15 Nevada Wolf Pack men's basketball team
Players
Coaches

Pos.	#	Name	Height	Weight	Year	Previous school	Hometown
G	1	Marqueze Coleman	6 ft 3 in (1.91 m)	185 lb (84 kg)	Jr	Bishop Alemany HS	Mission Hills, CA
G	2	Tyron Criswell	6 ft 4 in (1.93 m)	205 lb (93 kg)	Jr	Central CC	Omaha, NE
C	3	AJ West	6 ft 9 in (2.06 m)	230 lb (104 kg)	Sr	Monroe College	Brooklyn, NY
F	5	Kaileb Rodriguez	6 ft 9 in (2.06 m)	225 lb (102 kg)	So	Sheridan College	Highlands Ranch, CO
G	10	Stelios Papafloratos	6 ft 4 in (1.93 m)	170 lb (77 kg)	So	Redemption Christian Academy	Athens, Greece
G	11	Patrick Conroy	6 ft 2 in (1.88 m)	180 lb (82 kg)	So	Marin Catholic HS	Novato, CA
F	12	Elijah Foster	6 ft 7 in (2.01 m)	240 lb (109 kg)	Fr	Rainier Beach HS	Seattle, WA
G	15	DJ Fenner	6 ft 6 in (1.98 m)	205 lb (93 kg)	So	Seattle Prep	Seattle, WA
F	20	Robyn Missa	6 ft 9 in (2.06 m)	240 lb (109 kg)	Fr	Lutheran HS	Berlin, Germany
G	21	Eric Cooper, Jr.	6 ft 4 in (1.93 m)	185 lb (84 kg)	Fr	IMG Academy	Long Beach, CA
G	23	Michael Perez	6 ft 3 in (1.91 m)	190 lb (86 kg)	RS Sr	UTEP	Tucson, AZ
F/C	33	Ronnie Stevens, Jr.	6 ft 8 in (2.03 m)	230 lb (104 kg)	Sr	Indian Hills CC	Los Angeles, CA
F/C	34	Lucas Stivrins	6 ft 11 in (2.11 m)	212 lb (96 kg)	Jr	Pratt CC	Scottsdale, AZ

Head coach

- David Carter (Saint Mary's)

Assistant coach(es)

- Doug Novsek (Southern Illinois)
- Keith Brown (Hampton)
- Zac Claus (Eastern Washington)

Legend

- (C) Team captain
- (S) Suspended
- (I) Ineligible
- (W) Walk-on
- Injured
- Current redshirt

Roster
Last update: 2014-07-13

== Schedule ==
Date time, TV	Opponent	Result	Record	Site (attendance) city, state
Exhibition
11/08/2014; 7:00 pm	Cal State San Marcos	W 72–62		Lawlor Events Center (5,160); Reno, NV
Regular season
11/15/2014; 3:00 pm	Cal Poly	W 65–49	1–0	Lawlor Events Center (5,060); Reno, NV
11/17/2014; 7:00 pm	Adams State	W 69–64	2–0	Lawlor Events Center (4,932); Reno, NV
11/21/2014*; 1:00 pm, CBSSN	vs. Seton Hall; Paradise Jam quarterfinals	L 60–68	2–1	Sports and Fitness Center (1,351); St. Thomas, VI
11/22/2014*; 11:30 am, CBSSN	vs. Clemson; Paradise Jam consolation	L 50–59	2–2	Sports and Fitness Center (1,968); St. Thomas, VI
11/24/2014*; 10:30 am	vs. Weber State; Paradise Jam 7th place game	L 56–59	2–3	Sports and Fitness Center (1,342); St. Thomas, VI
11/29/2014*; 11:00 am	at Omaha	L 54–78	2–4	Ralston Arena (1,723); Omaha, NE
12/03/2014*; 7:00 pm	at Long Beach State	L 57–68	2–5	Walter Pyramid (3,293); Long Beach, CA
12/07/2014*; 1:00 pm, CBSSN	California	L 56–63	2–6	Lawlor Events Center (5,467); Reno, NV
12/13/2014*; 7:00 pm	Cal State Fullerton	L 55–65	2–7	Lawlor Events Center (4,858); Reno, NV
12/18/2014*; 7:00 pm	at Pacific	L 65–69	2–8	Alex G. Spanos Center (1,778); Stockton, CA
12/22/2014*; 7:00 pm	Marshall	W 83–55	3–8	Lawlor Events Center (4,738); Reno, NV
12/28/2014*; 3:00 pm	Northwest Christian	W 81–67	4–8	Lawlor Events Center (4,896); Reno, NV
01/03/2015; 3:00 pm	Air Force	W 80–62	5–8 (1–0)	Lawlor Events Center (6,638); Reno, NV
01/07/2015; 8:00 pm, CBSSN	at UNLV	W 64–62	6–8 (2–0)	Thomas & Mack Center (13,530); Paradise, NV
01/10/2015; 3:00 pm	Fresno State	L 66–69	6–9 (2–1)	Lawlor Events Center (5,310); Reno, NV
01/14/2015; 6:00 pm	at Colorado State	L 42–98	6–10 (2–2)	Moby Arena (3,667); Fort Collins, CO
01/20/2015; 7:00 pm	Utah State	L 54–70	6–11 (2–3)	Lawlor Events Center (5,318); Reno, NV
01/24/2015; 4:00 pm, ASN	at Fresno State	L 62–66	6–12 (2–4)	Save Mart Center (7,945); Fresno, CA
01/27/2015; 7:00 pm, ESPN3	UNLV	L 62–67	6–13 (2–5)	Lawlor Events Center (7,578); Reno, NV
01/31/2015; 3:00 pm, RTRM	at Wyoming	L 55–63	6–14 (2–6)	Arena-Auditorium (8,106); Laramie, WY
02/04/2015; 7:00 pm, ESPN3	San Diego State	L 63–65	6–15 (2–7)	Lawlor Events Center (5,832); Reno, NV
02/07/2015; 3:00 pm	at San Jose State	W 60–57	7–15 (3–7)	Event Center Arena (1,085); San Jose, CA
02/11/2015; 6:00 pm, RTRM	at Utah State	L 62–75	7–16 (3–8)	Smith Spectrum (9,472); Logan, UT
02/14/2015; 7:00 pm, ESPN2	New Mexico	W 66–63 ^{OT}	8–16 (4–8)	Lawlor Events Center (5,301); Reno, NV
02/17/2015; 7:00 pm	Wyoming	L 58–64	8–17 (4–9)	Lawlor Events Center (5,291); Reno, NV
02/21/2015; 12:00 pm, MWN	at Boise State	L 46–78	8–18 (4–10)	Taco Bell Arena (8,929); Boise, ID
02/25/2015; 6:00 pm, RTRM	at Air Force	L 70–75	8–19 (4–11)	Clune Arena (1,294); Colorado Springs, CO
02/28/2015; 3:00 pm	San Jose State	W 62–51	9–19 (5–11)	Lawlor Events Center (5,325); Reno, NV
03/04/2015; 7:00 pm	Colorado State	L 62–78	9–20 (5–12)	Lawlor Events Center (5,909); Reno, NV
03/07/2015; 7:00 pm, CBSSN	at San Diego State	L 43–67	9–21 (5–13)	Viejas Arena (12,414); San Diego, CA
Mountain West tournament
03/11/2015; 2:30 pm, MWN	vs. UNLV; First Round	L 46–67	9–22	Thomas & Mack Center (7,458); Paradise, NV
*Non-conference game. ^{#}Rankings from AP Poll. (#) Tournament seedings in parentheses. All times are in Pacific Time.
