= 2014–15 Wyoming Cowboys basketball team =

American college basketball season

2014–15 Wyoming Cowboys basketball

Mountain West tournament champions

NCAA tournament, round of 64
- Conference: Mountain West Conference
- Record: 25–10 (11–7 Mountain West)
- Head coach: Larry Shyatt (5th season)
- Assistant coaches: Scott Duncan; Jeremy Shyatt; Allen Edwards
- Home arena: Arena-Auditorium (Capacity: 15,028)

2014–15 Mountain West Conference men's basketball standings
	Conf.				Overall
Team	W		L	PCT	W		L	PCT
Boise State	14	–	4	.778	25	–	9	.735
San Diego State	14	–	4	.778	27	–	9	.750
Colorado State	13	–	5	.722	27	–	7	.794
Wyoming †	11	–	7	.611	25	–	10	.714
Utah State	11	–	7	.611	18	–	13	.581
Fresno State	10	–	8	.556	15	–	17	.469
UNLV	8	–	10	.444	18	–	15	.545
New Mexico	7	–	11	.389	15	–	16	.484
Air Force	6	–	12	.333	14	–	17	.452
Nevada	5	–	13	.278	9	–	22	.290
San Jose State*	0	–	18	.000	2	–	28	.067
† 2015 MWC tournament winner *Ineligible for postseason play due to APR penalties

The 2014–15 Wyoming Cowboys basketball team represented the University of Wyoming during the 2014–15 NCAA Division I men's basketball season. Their head coach was Larry Shyatt in his fifth year. They played their home games at the Arena-Auditorium in Laramie, Wyoming. The Cowboys were a member of the Mountain West Conference. They finished the season 25–10, 11–7 in Mountain West play to finish in a tie for fourth place. They defeated Utah State, Boise State and San Diego State to become champions of the Mountain West tournament. They received an automatic bid to the NCAA tournament where they lost in the first round to Northern Iowa.

== Previous season ==
The 2013–14 Wyoming Cowboys finished the season with an overall record of 18–15, 9–9 in the Mountain West to finish in a tie for fifth place. In the Mountain West Conference tournament, the Cowboys were defeated by UNLV in the quarterfinals. They were invited to the College Basketball Invitational where they lost in the first round to Texas A&M.

== Preseason ==
The Cowboys were picked to finish sixth in the Mountain West Conference preseason media poll. Larry Nance Jr. was named the preseason player of the year, as well as being named to the preseason all-Mountain West team.

== Regular season ==
On January 12, 2015 Wyoming was ranked in the Associated Press Top 25 Poll for the first time since 1988.

== Players ==
=== Departures ===
Name	Number	Pos.	Height	Weight	Year	Hometown	Notes
Jerron Granberry	15	G	6'4"	225	RS Senior	Miami, FL	Graduated
Nathan Sobey	20	G	6'3"	185	Senior	Warrnambool, AUS	Graduated
Keonta Vernon	24	F	6'5"	225	Freshman	Tulare, CA	Transferred to College of Southern Idaho
Zane Stull	33	G	6'1"	185	Freshman	Omaha, NE	Transferred

== Recruiting ==
College recruiting information
Name	Hometown	School	Height	Weight	Commit date
Jonathan Barnes #35 C	Parker, CO	Ponderosa High School	6 ft 9 in (2.06 m)	250 lb (110 kg)	Oct 28, 2013
Jonathan Barnes #35 C	Recruit ratings: Scout: Rivals: (75)				
Jeremy Lieberman #56 PG	Calabasas, CA	Calabasas High School	6 ft 2 in (1.88 m)	175 lb (79 kg)	Aug 21, 2013
Jeremy Lieberman #56 PG	Recruit ratings: Scout: Rivals: (70)				
Diontae Jones #87 SF	Las Vegas, NV	Clark High School	6 ft 6 in (1.98 m)	185 lb (84 kg)	Aug 8, 2013
Diontae Jones #87 SF	Recruit ratings: Scout: Rivals: (68)				
Tyrell Williams; PF	Miami, FL	Miami Norland High School	6 ft 7 in (2.01 m)	230 lb (100 kg)	Apr 29, 2014
Tyrell Williams; PF	Recruit ratings: Scout: Rivals: (N/A)				
Alexander Aka Gorski; SG	Uppsala, Sweden	Sunrise Christian Academy	6 ft 4 in (1.93 m)	195 lb (88 kg)	May 1, 2014
Alexander Aka Gorski; SG	Recruit ratings: Scout: Rivals: (N/A)				
Overall recruit ranking: Scout: – Rivals: –
Note: In many cases, Scout, Rivals, 247Sports, On3, and ESPN may conflict in their listings of height and weight.; In these cases, the average was taken. ESPN grades are on a 100-point scale.; Sources: "Wyoming Commit List for 2014". Rivals.; "Men's Basketball Recruiting". Scout.; "ESPN – Wyoming Cowboys Basketball Recruiting 2014". ESPN.; "Scout.com Team Recruiting Rankings". Scout.; "2014 Team Ranking". Rivals.

== Roster ==
2014–15 Wyoming Cowboys men's basketball team
Players
Coaches

Pos.	#	Name	Height	Weight	Year	Previous school	Hometown
G	0	Jeremy Lieberman	6 ft 1 in (1.85 m)	175 lb (79 kg)	Fr	Calabasas HS	Calabasas, CA
G	1	Charles Hankerson, Jr.	6 ft 4 in (1.93 m)	230 lb (104 kg)	RS Sr	Alabama	Miami, FL
G	2	Riley Grabau	6 ft 2 in (1.88 m)	165 lb (75 kg)	Sr	Boulder HS	Boulder, CO
G	3	Alex Aka Gorski	6 ft 5 in (1.96 m)	210 lb (95 kg)	Fr	Sunrise Christian Academy	Lund, Sweden
G	5	Trey Washington III (redshirt)	5 ft 11 in (1.8 m)	185 lb (84 kg)	So	Woodrow Wilson HS	Dallas, TX
F	11	Derek Cooke, Jr.	6 ft 9 in (2.06 m)	220 lb (100 kg)	Sr	Cloud Community CC	Washington, D.C.
G	13	Jack Bentz (W)	6 ft 1 in (1.85 m)	180 lb (82 kg)	Sr	University School	Chagrin Falls, OH
G	14	Josh Adams	6 ft 2 in (1.88 m)	185 lb (84 kg)	Jr	Chaparral HS	Parker, CO
C	21	Jonathan Barnes	6 ft 10 in (2.08 m)	240 lb (109 kg)	Fr	Ponderosa HS	Parker, CO
F	22	Larry Nance Jr. (C)	6 ft 8 in (2.03 m)	230 lb (104 kg)	Sr	Revere HS	Akron, OH
G	23	Jason McManamen	6 ft 5 in (1.96 m)	190 lb (86 kg)	RS So	Torrington HS	Torrington, WY
F	32	Alan Herndon	6 ft 9 in (2.06 m)	205 lb (93 kg)	RS Fr	Widefield HS	Colorado Springs, CO
F	44	Tyrell Williams (redshirt)	6 ft 8 in (2.03 m)	225 lb (102 kg)	Fr	Miami Norland HS	Miami, FL

Head coach

- Larry Shyatt (Wooster)

Assistant coach(es)

- Scott Duncan (Wooster)
- Allen Edwards (Kentucky)
- Jeremy Shyatt (Clemson)

Legend

- (C) Team captain
- (S) Suspended
- (I) Ineligible
- (W) Walk-on
- Injured
- Current redshirt

Roster

== Statistics ==
Player	GP	GS	MPG	FG%	3FG%	FT%	RPG	APG	SPG	BPG	PPG
Josh Adams	35	34	33.6	.437	.324	.743	3.3	3.6	1.4	0.2	12.8
Alexander Aka Gorski	20	0	8.3	.310	.267	.500	0.7	0.1	0.2	0.0	2.1
Jonathan Barnes	14	0	4.5	.500	.000	.600	1.1	0.1	0.1	0.3	1.4
Jack Bentz	22	1	8.3	.111	.000	.667	0.9	1.1	0.2	0.0	0.4
Derek Cooke Jr.	35	35	26.3	.720	1.000	.543	5.8	0.9	0.9	0.9	8.1
Riley Grabau	34	34	33.9	.377	.367	.939	2.2	2.1	0.2	0.1	9.1
Charles Hankerson Jr.	34	34	28.6	.386	.344	.456	3.2	2.6	0.9	0.0	6.9
Alan Herndon	31	2	15.4	.474	.174	.593	2.2	0.5	0.2	0.4	3.0
Jeremy Lieberman	25	0	9.0	.268	.185	.700	0.6	0.8	0.5	0.0	1.4
Jason McManamen	35	4	16.8	.407	.338	.429	1.5	0.9	0.3	0.0	3.7
Larry Nance Jr.	31	31	34.9	.514	.333	.786	7.2	2.5	1.2	1.2	16.1
Matt Sellers	15	0	9.4	.677	.000	.600	1.7	0.5	0.1	0.4	3.4

== Schedule and results ==
Date time, TV	Rank^{#}	Opponent^{#}	Result	Record	Site (attendance) city, state
Non-conference regular season
11/16/2014*; 2:00 pm		Northern Colorado; Wyoming Tournament	W 78–70	1–0	Arena-Auditorium (5,876); Laramie, WY
11/18/2014*; 7:00 pm		Western State	W 61–46	2–0	Arena-Auditorium (4,785); Laramie, WY
11/22/2014*; 4:00 pm, ESPN3		Colorado; Rivalry	W 56–33	3–0	Arena-Auditorium (9,066); Laramie, WY
11/24/2014*; 7:00 pm		Florida A&M; Wyoming Tournament	W 66–45	4–0	Arena-Auditorium (4,763); Laramie, WY
11/26/2014*; 7:00 pm		Stetson; Wyoming Tournament	W 65–41	5–0	Arena-Auditorium (4,668); Laramie, WY
11/29/2014*; 4:30 pm, RTRM		New Mexico State; Wyoming Tournament	W 78–75	6–0	Arena-Auditorium (5,474); Laramie, WY
12/02/2014*; 7:00 pm, RTRM		Denver	W 68–42	7–0	Arena-Auditorium (4,928); Laramie, WY
12/05/2014*; 5:00 pm, ESPNews		at SMU	L 53–66	7–1	Moody Coliseum (6,852); Dallas, TX
12/07/2014*; 2:00 pm		Regis	W 70–35	8–1	Arena-Auditorium (4,598); Laramie, WY
12/10/2014*; 9:00 pm, P12N		at California	L 42–45	8–2	Haas Pavilion (6,648); Berkeley, CA
12/14/2014*; 12:00 pm, RTRM		Montana State	W 70–61	9–2	Arena-Auditorium (4,567); Laramie, WY
12/20/2014*; 2:00 pm, RTRM		Southern	W 57–39	10–2	Arena-Auditorium (4,925); Laramie, WY
12/23/2014*; 7:00 pm		at Montana State	W 61–51	11–2	Worthington Arena (2,107); Bozeman, MT
Mountain West regular season
12/31/2014; 7:00 pm, ESPN3		UNLV	W 76–71	12–2 (1–0)	Arena-Auditorium (6,011); Laramie, WY
01/03/2015; 8:00 pm		at San Jose State	W 64–59	13–2 (2–0)	Event Center Arena (1,188); San Jose, CA
01/07/2015; 7:00 pm		at Colorado State; Border War	W 60–54	14–2 (3–0)	Moby Arena (8,018); Fort Collins, CO
01/10/2015; 4:00 pm, CBSSN		Boise State	W 65–54	15–2 (4–0)	Arena-Auditorium (7,024); Laramie, WY
01/14/2015; 9:00 pm, ESPN2	No. 25	San Diego State	L 52–60	15–3 (4–1)	Arena-Auditorium (6,178); Laramie, WY
01/17/2015; 5:00 pm, ESPN3	No. 25	at Fresno State	W 70–65 ^{3OT}	16–3 (5–1)	Save Mart Center (8,118); Fresno, CA
01/24/2015; 2:00 pm, ESPN3		New Mexico	W 63–62 ^{OT}	17–3 (6–1)	Arena-Auditorium (10,167); Laramie, WY
01/27/2015; 7:00 pm, RTRM		at Utah State; Rivalry	L 44–56	17–4 (6–2)	Smith Spectrum (9,744); Logan, UT
01/31/2015; 4:00 pm, RTRM		Nevada	W 63–55	18–4 (7–2)	Arena-Auditorium (8,106); Laramie, WY
02/04/2015; 7:00 pm		Colorado State; Border War	W 59–48	19–4 (8–2)	Arena-Auditorium (8,672); Laramie, WY
02/07/2015; 12:00 pm, RTRM		at Air Force	L 50–73	19–5 (8–3)	Clune Arena (4,021); Colorado Springs, CO
02/11/2015; 9:00 pm, CBSSN		at San Diego State	L 41–67	19–6 (8–4)	Viejas Arena (12,414); San Diego, CA
02/14/2015; 4:00 pm, RTRM		San Jose State	W 77–60	20–6 (9–4)	Arena-Auditorium (7,870); Laramie, WY
02/17/2015; 8:00 pm		at Nevada	W 64–58	21–6 (10–4)	Lawlor Events Center (5,291); Reno, NV
02/25/2015; 7:30 pm, CBSSN		Fresno State	L 59–64	21–7 (10–5)	Arena-Auditorium (5,868); Laramie, WY
02/28/2015; 5:00 pm, CBSSN		at UNLV	L 57–69	21–8 (10–6)	Thomas & Mack Center (12,659); Paradise, NV
03/04/2015; 7:00 pm		Utah State; Rivalry	W 76–53	22–8 (11–6)	Arena-Auditorium (6,327); Laramie, WY
03/07/2015; 6:00 pm, CBSSN		at New Mexico	L 49–52 ^{OT}	22–9 (11–7)	The Pit (15,411); Albuquerque, NM
Mountain West tournament
03/12/2015; 3:30 pm, CBSSN	(4)	vs. (5) Utah State; Quarterfinals	W 67–65	23–9	Thomas & Mack Center (7,308); Paradise, NV
03/13/2015; 7:00 pm, CBSSN	(4)	vs. (1) No. 25 Boise State; Semifinals	W 71–66 ^{OT}	24–9	Thomas & Mack Center (9,199); Paradise, NV
03/14/2015; 4:00 pm, CBS	(4)	vs. (2) San Diego State; Championship game	W 45–43	25–9	Thomas & Mack Center (10,002); Paradise, NV
NCAA tournament
03/20/2015*; 11:40 am, TBS	(12 E)	vs. (5 E) No. 11 Northern Iowa; Round of 64	L 54–71	25–10	KeyArena (14,509); Seattle, WA
*Non-conference game. ^{#}Rankings from AP Poll. (#) Tournament seedings in parentheses. All times are in Mountain Time. (#) during NCAA Tournament is seed with Region E=East.

== Rankings ==
Ranking movement Legend: ██ Increase in ranking. ██ Decrease in ranking. ██ Not ranked the previous week.
Poll	Pre	Wk 2	Wk 3	Wk 4	Wk 5	Wk 6	Wk 7	Wk 8	Wk 9	Wk 10	Wk 11	Wk 12	Wk 13	Wk 14	Wk 15	Wk 16	Wk 17	Wk 18	Wk 19	Final
AP	NR	NR	RV	RV	NR	NR	NR	NR	RV	25	RV	RV	NR	NR	NR	NR	NR	NR	RV	N/A
Coaches	NR	NR	RV	RV	NR	NR	NR	NR	RV	RV	RV	RV	RV	RV	NR	NR	NR	NR	RV	NR

*AP does not release post-tournament rankings

== See also ==
- 2014–15 Wyoming Cowgirls basketball team
