= 2014–15 UNLV Runnin' Rebels basketball team =

American college basketball season

2014–15 UNLV Runnin' Rebels men's basketball
- Conference: Mountain West Conference
- Record: 18–15 (8–10 Mountain West)
- Head coach: Dave Rice (4th season)
- Assistant coaches: Ryan Miller (1st season); Stacey Augmon; Todd Simon
- Home arena: Thomas & Mack Center

2014–15 Mountain West Conference men's basketball standings
	Conf.				Overall
Team	W		L	PCT	W		L	PCT
Boise State	14	–	4	.778	25	–	9	.735
San Diego State	14	–	4	.778	27	–	9	.750
Colorado State	13	–	5	.722	27	–	7	.794
Wyoming †	11	–	7	.611	25	–	10	.714
Utah State	11	–	7	.611	18	–	13	.581
Fresno State	10	–	8	.556	15	–	17	.469
UNLV	8	–	10	.444	18	–	15	.545
New Mexico	7	–	11	.389	15	–	16	.484
Air Force	6	–	12	.333	14	–	17	.452
Nevada	5	–	13	.278	9	–	22	.290
San Jose State*	0	–	18	.000	2	–	28	.067
† 2015 MWC tournament winner *Ineligible for postseason play due to APR penalties

The 2014–15 UNLV Runnin' Rebels basketball team represented the University of Nevada, Las Vegas during the 2014–15 NCAA Division I men's basketball season. The Runnin' Rebels were led by fourth year head coach Dave Rice. They played their home games at the Thomas & Mack Center in Paradise, Nevada as members of the Mountain West Conference. They finished the season 18–15, 8–10 in Mountain West play to finish in seventh place. They advanced to the quarterfinals of the Mountain West tournament where they lost to San Diego State.

== Off Season ==
=== Departures ===
Name	Number	Pos.	Height	Weight	Year	Hometown	Notes
Carlos Lopez–Sosa	11	PF	6'11"	225	RS Senior	Lajas, Puerto Rico	Graduated.
Kevin Olekaibe	3	G	6'2"	180	Senior	Las Vegas, Nevada	Graduated.
Khem Birch	2	F	6'9"	220	RS Junior	Montreal, Quebec	Declared for 2014 NBA draft.
Bryce Dejean-Jones	13	G	6'5"	210	RS Junior	Los Angeles, California	Elected to transfer to Iowa State.
Roscoe Smith	1	F	6'8"	215	RS Junior	Baltimore, Maryland	Declared for 2014 NBA Draft.

=== Incoming transfers ===
Name	Number	Pos.	Height	Weight	Year	Hometown	Notes
Ben Carter	34	F	6'8"	219	Sophomore	Las Vegas, Nevada	Transferred from Oregon. Under NCAA transfer rules, Carter will have to redshirt for the 2014–15 season. Will have two years of remaining eligibility.
Cody Doolin	45	G	6'2"	183	Senior	Austin, Texas	Transferred from San Francisco. Because Doolin graduated from San Francisco, he will be eligible to play immediately for the 2014–15 season.

=== 2014 Recruiting Class ===
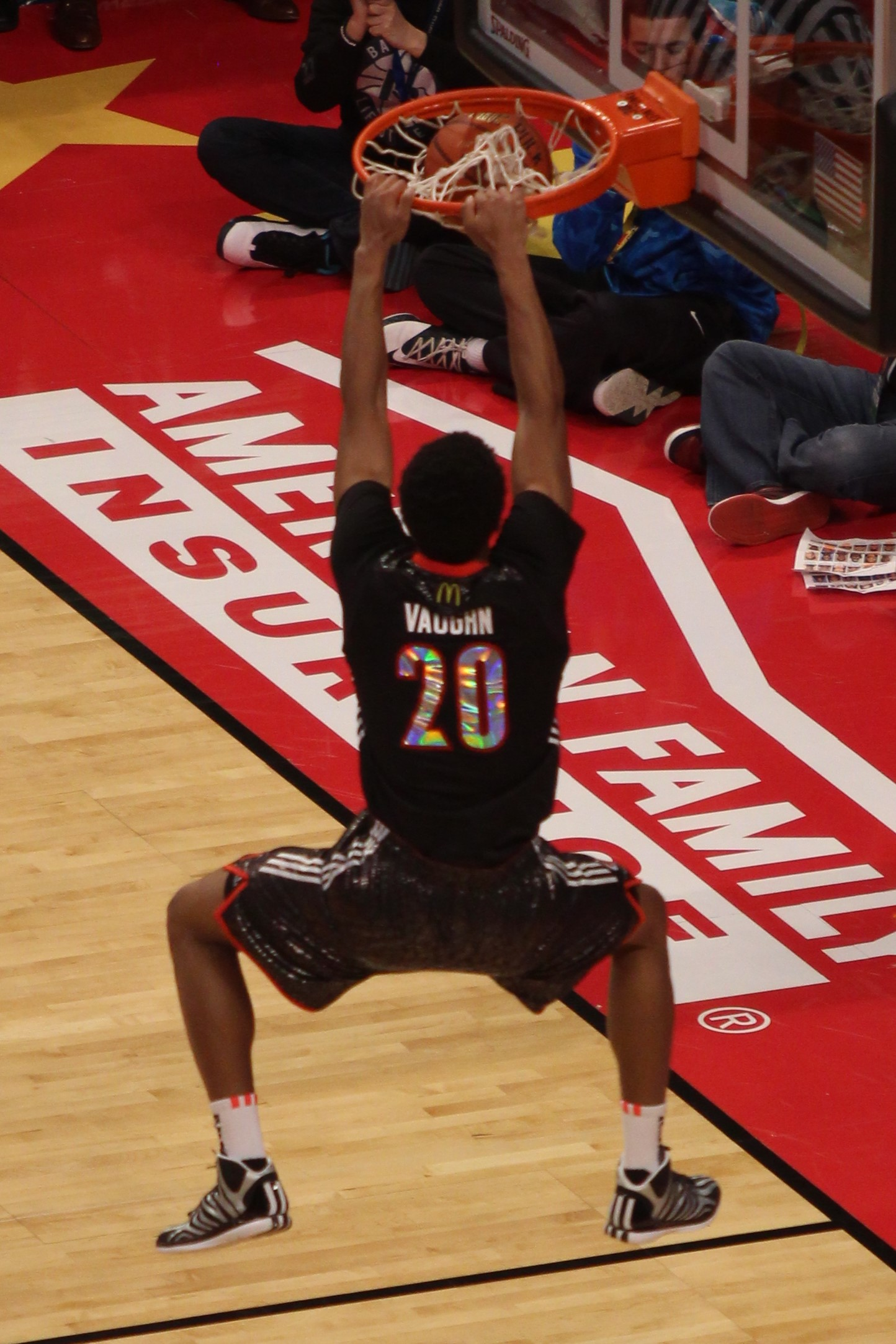
Rashad Vaughn in the 2014 McDonald's All-American Boys Game

College recruiting information
Name	Hometown	School	Height	Weight	Commit date
Dwayne Morgan; SF	Baltimore, MD	St. Frances Academy	6 ft 7 in (2.01 m)	190 lb (86 kg)	Mar 27, 2013
Dwayne Morgan; SF	Recruit ratings: Scout: Rivals: 247Sports: (87)				
Goodluck Okonoboh; C	Woburn, MA	Wilbraham & Monson Academy	6 ft 9 in (2.06 m)	215 lb (98 kg)	Oct 3, 2013
Goodluck Okonoboh; C	Recruit ratings: Scout: Rivals: 247Sports: (92)				
Rashad Vaughn; SG	Golden Valley, MN	Findlay Prep	6 ft 6 in (1.98 m)	200 lb (91 kg)	Feb 11, 2014
Rashad Vaughn; SG	Recruit ratings: Scout: Rivals: 247Sports: (93)				
Patrick McCaw; SG	St. Louis, MO	Montrose Christian School	6 ft 5 in (1.96 m)	180 lb (82 kg)	Apr 19, 2014
Patrick McCaw; SG	Recruit ratings: Scout: Rivals: 247Sports:				
Jordan Cornish; SG	New Orleans, LA	Brother Martin HS	6 ft 5 in (1.96 m)	185 lb (84 kg)	May 20, 2014
Jordan Cornish; SG	Recruit ratings: Scout: Rivals: 247Sports:				
Overall recruit ranking: Scout: #16 Rivals: #14 ESPN: #11
Note: In many cases, Scout, Rivals, 247Sports, On3, and ESPN may conflict in their listings of height and weight.; In these cases, the average was taken. ESPN grades are on a 100-point scale.; Sources: "2014 UNLV Runnin' Rebels Basketball Commits". ESPN.

== Roster ==
2014–15 UNLV Runnin' Rebels men's basketball team
Players
Coaches

Pos.	#	Name	Height	Weight	Year	Previous school	Hometown
G	1	Rashad Vaughn	6 ft 6 in (1.98 m)	210 lb (95 kg)	Fr	Findlay Prep	Golden Valley, MN
G	2	Patrick McCaw	6 ft 6 in (1.98 m)	180 lb (82 kg)	Fr	Montrose Christian School	St. Louis, MO
G	3	Jordan Cornish	6 ft 6 in (1.98 m)	220 lb (100 kg)	Fr	Brother Martin HS	New Orleans, LA
F	5	Christian Wood	6 ft 11 in (2.11 m)	220 lb (100 kg)	So	Findlay Prep	Los Angeles, CA
G	10	Daquan Cook	6 ft 1 in (1.85 m)	170 lb (77 kg)	Jr	St. Frances Academy	Baltimore, MD
F/C	11	Goodluck Okonoboh	6 ft 10 in (2.08 m)	225 lb (102 kg)	Fr	Wilbraham & Monson Academy	Woburn, MA
G	12	Barry Cheaney (W)	6 ft 1 in (1.85 m)	165 lb (75 kg)	RS Jr	Los Osos HS	Corona, CA
F	13	Ben Carter (redshirt)	6 ft 8 in (2.03 m)	225 lb (102 kg)	Jr	Oregon	Las Vegas, NV
F	15	Dwayne Morgan	6 ft 8 in (2.03 m)	205 lb (93 kg)	Fr	St. Frances Academy	Baltimore, MD
G	20	Jerome Seagears (redshirt)	6 ft 1 in (1.85 m)	180 lb (82 kg)	Sr	Rutgers	Silver Spring, MD
G	22	Jelan Kendrick	6 ft 6 in (1.98 m)	210 lb (95 kg)	Sr	Indian Hills CC	Atlanta, GA
G	30	Dantley Walker	5 ft 11 in (1.8 m)	170 lb (77 kg)	RS Fr	Lincoln County HS	Panaca, NV
G	33	Charles Rushman (W)	6 ft 3 in (1.91 m)	185 lb (84 kg)	RS So	St. John's Prep	Milwaukee, WI
G	45	Cody Doolin	6 ft 3 in (1.91 m)	180 lb (82 kg)	Sr	San Francisco	Austin, TX

Head coach

- Dave Rice (UNLV)

Assistant coach(es)

- Ryan Miller (Northern State)
- Stacey Augmon (UNLV)
- Todd Simon (Central Michigan)

Legend

- (C) Team captain
- (S) Suspended
- (I) Ineligible
- (W) Walk-on
- Injured
- Current redshirt

Roster
Last update: 07/13/2014

== Schedule and results ==
Date time, TV	Opponent	Result	Record	Site (attendance) city, state
Exhibition
11/05/2014*; 7:00 pm	Florida National	W 100–65		Thomas & Mack Center (10,253); Paradise, NV
Regular season
11/14/2014*; 7:00 pm	Morehead State; Coaches vs. Cancer Classic	W 60–59	1–0	Thomas & Mack Center (12,582); Paradise, NV
11/16/2014*; 5:00 pm	Sam Houston State; Coaches vs. Cancer Classic	W 59–57	2–0	Thomas & Mack Center (10,902); Paradise, NV
11/21/2014*; 4:00 pm, TruTV	vs. Stanford; Coaches vs. Cancer Classic Semifinals	L 60–89	2–1	Barclays Center (10,135); Brooklyn, NY
11/22/2014*; 4:00 pm, TruTV	vs. Temple; Coaches vs. Cancer Classic Consolation	W 57–50	3–1	Barclays Center (10,046); Brooklyn, NY
11/29/2014*; 7:00 pm	Albany	W 75–59	4–1	Thomas & Mack Center (11,209); Paradise, NV
12/03/2014*; 5:00 pm, P12N	at Arizona State	L 55–77	4–2	Wells Fargo Arena (5,822); Tempe, AZ
12/05/2014*; 7:00 pm	vs. Saint Katherine	W 113–53	5–2	Orleans Arena (3,775); Paradise, NV
12/13/2014*; 5:00 pm, MSN	vs. South Dakota	W 75–61	6–2	Sanford Pentagon (3,250); Sioux Falls, SD
12/17/2014*; 7:00 pm	Portland	W 75–73 ^{OT}	7–2	Thomas & Mack Center (12,536); Paradise, NV
12/20/2014*; 8:30 pm, ESPN2	vs. No. 14 Utah; MGM Grand Showcase	L 46–59	7–3	MGM Grand Garden Arena (N/A); Paradise, NV
12/23/2014*; 7:00 pm, CBSSN	No. 3 Arizona	W 71–67	8–3	Thomas & Mack Center (15,387); Paradise, NV
12/27/2014*; 7:00 pm	Southern Utah	W 79–45	9–3	Thomas & Mack Center (13,556); Paradise, NV
12/31/2014; 6:00 pm, ESPN3	at Wyoming	L 71–76	9–4 (0–1)	Arena-Auditorium (6,011); Laramie, WY
01/04/2015*; 1:30 pm, CBS	at No. 13 Kansas	L 61–76	9–5	Allen Fieldhouse (16,300); Lawrence, KS
01/07/2015; 8:00 pm, CBSSN	Nevada	L 62–64	9–6 (0–2)	Thomas & Mack Center (13,530); Paradise, NV
01/10/2015; 7:00 pm	San Jose State	W 74–40	10–6 (1–2)	Thomas & Mack Center (12,623); Paradise, NV
01/13/2015; 8:00 pm, ESPNU	at Boise State	L 73–82 ^{OT}	10–7 (1–3)	Taco Bell Arena (4,387); Boise, ID
01/17/2015; 3:00 pm, CBSSN	at San Diego State	L 47–53	10–8 (1–4)	Viejas Arena (12,414); San Diego, CA
01/21/2015; 8:00 pm, CBSSN	New Mexico	L 69–71	10–9 (1–5	Thomas & Mack Center (12,125); Paradise, NV
01/24/2015; 5:00 pm, CBSSN	Utah State	W 79–77	11–9 (2–5)	Thomas & Mack Center (11,975); Paradise, NV
01/27/2015; 7:00 pm, ESPN3	at Nevada	W 67–62	12–9 (3–5)	Lawlor Events Center (7,578); Reno, NV
01/31/2015; 7:00 pm, ESPN3	Air Force	W 74–63	13–9 (4–5)	Thomas & Mack Center (13,137); Paradise, NV
02/07/2015; 1:00 pm, CBSSN	at Colorado State	L 82–83	13–10 (4–6)	Moby Arena (7,113); Fort Collins, CO
02/10/2015; 7:00 pm, ESPN3	Fresno State	W 73–61	14–10 (5–6)	Thomas & Mack Center (12,384); Paradise, NV
02/14/2015; 11:00 am, ESPN3	at Air Force	L 75–76	14–11 (5–7)	Clune Arena (1,702); Colorado Springs, CO
02/18/2015; 8:00 pm, CBSSN	Boise State	L 48–53	14–12 (5–8)	Thomas & Mack Center (13,675); Paradise, NV
02/21/2015; 3:00 pm, CBSSN	at New Mexico	W 76–68	15–12 (6–8)	The Pit (15,145); Albuquerque, NM
02/24/2015; 6:30 pm, CBSSN	at Utah State	L 65–83	15–13 (6–9)	Smith Spectrum (9,503); Logan, UT
02/28/2015; 5:00 pm, CBSSN	Wyoming	W 69–57	16–13 (7–9)	Thomas & Mack Center (12,659); Paradise, NV
03/04/2015; 8:00 pm, CBSSN	San Diego State	L 58–60	16–14 (7–10)	Thomas & Mack Center (13,454); Paradise, NV
03/07/2015; 7:00 pm, ESPN3	at San Jose State	W 71–58	17–14 (8–10)	Event Center Arena (2,106); San Jose, CA
Mountain West tournament
03/11/2015; 2:30 pm, MWN	vs. Nevada; First round	W 67–46	18–14	Thomas & Mack Center (7,458); Paradise, NV
03/12/2015; 6:00 pm, CBSSN	vs. San Diego State; Quarterfinals	L 64–67	18–15	Thomas & Mack Center (8,655); Paradise, NV
*Non-conference game. ^{#}Rankings from AP Poll. (#) Tournament seedings in parentheses. All times are in Pacific Time.
