= 2014–15 New Mexico Lobos men's basketball team =

American college basketball season

2014–15 New Mexico Lobos men's basketball
- Conference: Mountain West Conference
- Record: 15–16 (7–11 Mountain West)
- Head coach: Craig Neal (2nd season)
- Assistant coaches: Drew Adams; Lamont Smith; Alan Huss
- Home arena: The Pit (Capacity: 15,411)

2014–15 Mountain West Conference men's basketball standings
	Conf.				Overall
Team	W		L	PCT	W		L	PCT
Boise State	14	–	4	.778	25	–	9	.735
San Diego State	14	–	4	.778	27	–	9	.750
Colorado State	13	–	5	.722	27	–	7	.794
Wyoming †	11	–	7	.611	25	–	10	.714
Utah State	11	–	7	.611	18	–	13	.581
Fresno State	10	–	8	.556	15	–	17	.469
UNLV	8	–	10	.444	18	–	15	.545
New Mexico	7	–	11	.389	15	–	16	.484
Air Force	6	–	12	.333	14	–	17	.452
Nevada	5	–	13	.278	9	–	22	.290
San Jose State*	0	–	18	.000	2	–	28	.067
† 2015 MWC tournament winner *Ineligible for postseason play due to APR penalties

The 2014–15 New Mexico Lobos men's basketball team represented the University of New Mexico during the 2014–15 NCAA Division I men's basketball season as a member of the Mountain West Conference. They played their home games at The Pit in Albuquerque, New Mexico. The Lobos were led by second-year head coach Craig Neal. They finished the season 15–16, 7–11 in Mountain West play, to finish in eighth place. They lost in the first round of the Mountain West tournament to Fresno State.

== Previous season ==
The Lobos finished the season with an overall record of 27–7, 15–3 in the Mountain West play, to finish in second place. In the Mountain West Conference tournament, the Lobos defeated Fresno State, Boise State and San Diego State to become the tournament champions, their third consecutive title. The Lobos received an automatic bid to the 2014 NCAA tournament as a 7-seed in the South Region. They were defeated by Stanford 58–53 in the Round of 64.

== Offseason ==
=== Departures ===
Name	Number	Pos.	Height	Weight	Year	Hometown	Notes
Cameron Bairstow	41	PF	6'9"	250	Senior	Brisbane, Australia	Graduated/2014 NBA draft
Chris Perez	2	PG	6'0"	190	Senior	Corona, CA	Graduated
Kendall Williams	10	SG	6'4"	180	Senior	Rancho Cucamonga, CA	Graduated/2014 NBA draft
Alex Kirk	53	C	7'0"	245	RS Junior	Los Alamos, NM	Declared for 2014 NBA draft
Cleveland Thomas	1	G	6'3"	195	Junior	Baton Rouge, LA	Elected to transfer
Nick Banyard	23	F	6'8"	205	Sophomore	Flower Mound, TX	Elected to transfer
Tim Myles	24	F	6'6"	225	Freshman	Rancho Cucamonga, CA	Elected to transfer
Merv Lindsay	22	G/F	6'7"	215	RS Sophomore	Moreno Valley, CA	Elected to transfer

=== Incoming transfers ===
Name	Number	Pos.	Height	Weight	Year	Hometown	Notes
J.J. N'Ganga	0	F	6'10"	260	Sophomore	Aubervilliers, France	Junior college transfer from Northern Oklahoma College
Jordan Goodman	2	F	6'9"	210	Sophomore	Largo, MD	Junior college transfer from Harcum College
Elijah Brown	4	G	6'4"	185	Sophomore	Santa Ana, CA	Transferred from Butler. Under NCAA transfer rules, Brown will have to redshirt for the 2014–15 season. Will have three years of remaining eligibility.
Tim Williams	32	F	6'8"	210	Junior	Chicago, IL	Transferred from Samford. Under NCAA transfer rules, Williams will have to redshirt for the 2014–15 season. Will have two years of remaining eligibility.

=== 2014 recruiting class ===
College recruiting information
Name	Hometown	School	Height	Weight	Commit date
Sam Logwood; SF	Indianapolis, IN	La Lumiere HS	6 ft 7 in (2.01 m)	205 lb (93 kg)	Aug 16, 2014
Sam Logwood; SF	Recruit ratings: Scout: Rivals: 247Sports: ESPN: (79)				
Xavier Adams; G/F	Flower Mound, TX	Marcus HS	6 ft 5 in (1.96 m)	195 lb (88 kg)	Jan 13, 2013
Xavier Adams; G/F	Recruit ratings: Scout: Rivals: 247Sports: ESPN: (70)				
Joe Furstinger; PF	Rancho Santa Margarita, CA	Santa Margarita Catholic HS	6 ft 8 in (2.03 m)	210 lb (95 kg)	Oct 5, 2013
Joe Furstinger; PF	Recruit ratings: Scout: Rivals: 247Sports: ESPN: (70)				
Overall recruit ranking:
Note: In many cases, Scout, Rivals, 247Sports, On3, and ESPN may conflict in their listings of height and weight.; In these cases, the average was taken. ESPN grades are on a 100-point scale.; Sources: "2014 New Mexico Basketball Commits". ESPN.

College recruiting information (2014)
Name	Hometown	School	Height	Weight	Commit date
Jordan Hunter; SG	Beaumont, TX	Ozen HS	5 ft 11 in (1.80 m)	160 lb (73 kg)	Nov 10, 2013
Jordan Hunter; SG	Recruit ratings: Scout: Rivals: 247Sports: (78)				
Dane Kuiper; SF	Tempe, AZ	Corona del Sol HS	6 ft 5 in (1.96 m)	190 lb (86 kg)	Jul 14, 2013
Dane Kuiper; SF	Recruit ratings: Scout: Rivals: 247Sports: (75)				
Anthony Mathis; SG	West Linn, OR	West Linn HS	6 ft 2 in (1.88 m)	170 lb (77 kg)	May 15, 2014
Anthony Mathis; SG	Recruit ratings: Scout: Rivals: 247Sports: (70)				
Overall recruit ranking:
Note: In many cases, Scout, Rivals, 247Sports, On3, and ESPN may conflict in their listings of height and weight.; In these cases, the average was taken. ESPN grades are on a 100-point scale.; Sources: "2015 New Mexico Basketball Commits". ESPN.

== Roster ==
2014–15 New Mexico Lobos men's basketball team
Players
Coaches

Pos.	#	Name	Height	Weight	Year	Hometown
F	0	J.J. N'Ganga	6 ft 10 in (2.08 m)	250 lb (113 kg)	Jr	Aubervilliers, France
G	1	Cullen Neal (injured)	6 ft 4 in (1.93 m)	190 lb (86 kg)	So	Albuquerque, NM
F	2	Jordan Goodman	6 ft 9 in (2.06 m)	205 lb (93 kg)	Jr	Largo, MD
G	3	Hugh Greenwood	6 ft 3 in (1.91 m)	205 lb (93 kg)	Sr	Hobart, Australia
G	4	Elijah Brown (redshirt)	6 ft 4 in (1.93 m)	190 lb (86 kg)	So	Cleveland, OH
F	5	Arthur Edwards	6 ft 6 in (1.98 m)	210 lb (95 kg)	Jr	Temple Hills, MD
C	11	Obij Aget	7 ft 1 in (2.16 m)	220 lb (100 kg)	So	La Porte, IN
G/F	12	Devon Williams	6 ft 8 in (2.03 m)	205 lb (93 kg)	RS So	Dallas, TX
G/F	20	Sam Logwood	6 ft 7 in (2.01 m)	210 lb (95 kg)	Fr	Indianapolis, IN
G	21	Xavier Adams	6 ft 4 in (1.93 m)	205 lb (93 kg)	Fr	Flower Mound, TX
F	23	Joe Furstinger	6 ft 9 in (2.06 m)	210 lb (95 kg)	Fr	Rancho Santa Margarita, CA
G	25	Tim Jacobs	6 ft 0 in (1.83 m)	200 lb (91 kg)	Jr	Las Cruces, NM
G	30	Adam Cumber	6 ft 2 in (1.88 m)	180 lb (82 kg)	Fr	Albuquerque, NM
F	32	Tim Williams (redshirt)	6 ft 8 in (2.03 m)	220 lb (100 kg)	Jr	Flossmoor, IL
G	33	DeShawn Delaney	6 ft 5 in (1.96 m)	200 lb (91 kg)	Sr	Chicago, IL

Head coach

- Craig Neal (Georgia Tech)

Assistant coach(es)

- Lamont Smith (San Diego)
- Drew Adams (Tennessee)
- Alan Huss (Creighton)

Legend

- (C) Team captain
- (S) Suspended
- (I) Ineligible
- (W) Walk-on
- Injured
- Current redshirt

Roster
Last update: June 4, 2024

== Schedule ==
Date time, TV	Opponent	Result	Record	Site (attendance) city, state
Exhibition
11/01/2014*; 7:00 p.m.	Western New Mexico	W 89–45		The Pit (13,131); Albuquerque, NM
11/07/2014*; 7:00 p.m.	Adams State	W 62–50		The Pit (13,171); Albuquerque, NM
Regular season
11/14/2014*; 8:00 p.m., RTRM	Idaho State	W 79–55	1–0	The Pit (13,927); Albuquerque, NM
11/16/2014*; 7:00 p.m., RTRM	Cal State Fullerton	W 67–59	2–0	The Pit (13,829); Albuquerque, NM
11/20/2014*; 3:00 p.m., ESPN2	vs. Boston College; Puerto Rico Tip-Off quarterfinals	L 65–69	2–1	Roberto Clemente Coliseum (6,723); San Juan, PR
11/21/2014*; 5:00 p.m., ESPN3	vs. George Mason; Puerto Rico Tip-Off consolation second round	W 69–58	3–1	Roberto Clemente Coliseum (7,438); San Juan, PR
11/23/2014*; 12:00 p.m., ESPNU	vs. Texas A&M; Puerto Rico Tip-Off fifth-place game	L 51–64	3–2	Roberto Clemente Coliseum (8,002); San Juan, PR
11/30/2014*; 2:00 p.m., CBSSN	USC	L 54–66	3–3	The Pit (14,404); Albuquerque, NM
12/03/2014*; 7:00 p.m., ESPN3	New Mexico State; Rio Grande Rivalry	W 62–47	4–3	The Pit (15,335); Albuquerque, NM
12/06/2014*; 6:00 p.m., ESPN3	at Valparaiso	W 63–46	5–3	Athletics–Recreation Center (4,227); Valparaiso, IN
12/13/2014*; 6:00 p.m., RTRM	Louisiana–Monroe	W 54–46	6–3	The Pit (13,710); Albuquerque, NM
12/17/2014*; 8:00 p.m., RTRM	Central Arkansas	W 76–55	7–3	The Pit (13,117); Albuquerque, NM
12/20/2014*; 7:00 p.m., RTRM	at New Mexico State; Rio Grande Rivalry	W 69–67	8–3	Pan American Center (8,148); Las Cruces, NM
12/23/2014*; 7:00 p.m.	at Grand Canyon	L 65–68	8–4	GCU Arena (6,340); Phoenix, AZ
12/31/2014; 5:00 p.m., ESPN3	Fresno State	W 76–64	9–4 (1–0)	The Pit (14,478); Albuquerque, NM
01/03/2015; 6:00 p.m., CBSSN	No. 24 Colorado State	W 66–53	10–4 (2–0)	The Pit (15,225); Albuquerque, NM
01/06/2015; 9:00 p.m., CBSSN	at San Diego State	L 42–56	10–5 (2–1)	Viejas Arena (12,414); San Diego, CA
01/10/2015; 7:00 p.m., ESPN3	at Utah State	W 66–60	11–5 (3–1)	Smith Spectrum (9,898); Logan, UT
01/14/2015; 7:00 p.m., RTRM	Air Force	W 60–48	12–5 (4–1)	The Pit (13,891); Albuquerque, NM
01/18/2015; 4:00 p.m., CBSSN	Boise State	L 59–69	12–6 (4–2)	The Pit (15,206); Albuquerque, NM
01/21/2015; 9:00 p.m., CBSSN	at UNLV	W 71–69	13–6 (5–2)	Thomas & Mack Center (12,125); Paradise, NV
01/24/2015; 2:00 p.m., ESPN3	at Wyoming	L 62–63	13–7 (5–3)	Arena-Auditorium (10,167); Laramie, WY
01/31/2015; 6:00 p.m., RTRM	San Jose State	W 67–41	14–7 (6–3)	The Pit (14,358); Albuquerque, NM
02/04/2015; 7:00 p.m., RTRM	at Air Force	L 49–53	14–8 (6–4)	Clune Arena (1,631); Colorado Springs, CO
02/07/2015; 4:00 p.m., RTRM	Utah State	L 60–63	14–9 (6–5)	The Pit (15,111); Albuquerque, NM
02/10/2015; 9:00 p.m., ESPNU	at Colorado State	L 59–70	14–10 (6–6)	Moby Arena (5,812); Fort Collins, CO
02/14/2015; 8:00 p.m., ESPN2	at Nevada	L 63–66 ^{OT}	14–11 (6–7)	Lawlor Events Center (5,301); Reno, NV
02/17/2015; 7:30 p.m., CBSSN	San Diego State	L 46–63	14–12 (6–8)	The Pit (15,411); Albuquerque, NM
02/21/2015; 4:00 p.m., CBSSN	UNLV	L 68–76	14–13 (6–9)	The Pit (15,145); Albuquerque, NM
02/24/2015; 9:00 p.m., ESPNU	at Boise State	L 65–76	14–14 (6–10)	Taco Bell Arena (4,991); Boise, ID
02/28/2015; 8:00 p.m., ESPNU	at Fresno State	L 55–59	14–15 (6–11)	Save Mart Center (8,310); Fresno, CA
03/07/2015; 6:00 p.m., CBSSN	Wyoming	W 52–49 ^{OT}	15–15 (7–11)	The Pit (15,411); Albuquerque, NM
Mountain West tournament
03/11/2015; 12:00 p.m., MWN	vs. Air Force; First round	L 61–68	15–16	Thomas and Mack Center (7,458); Paradise, NV
*Non-conference game. ^{#}Rankings from AP poll. (#) Tournament seedings in parentheses. All times are in Mountain Time.
