= Jalen Moore (basketball, born 1995) =

American basketball player

Personal information
- Born: August 21, 1995 (age 31) Logan, Utah, U.S.
- Listed height: 6 ft 8 in (2.03 m)
- Listed weight: 218 lb (99 kg)

Career information
- High school: Sky View (Smithfield, Utah)
- College: Utah State (2013–2017)
- NBA draft: 2017: undrafted
- Position: Small forward

Career highlights
- 2× Second-team All-Mountain West (2015, 2017)
- Stats at Basketball Reference

Jalen Dwaine Moore (born August 21, 1995) is an American former basketball player. He played college basketball for Utah State University.

== College career ==
Moore came to Utah State from Sky View High School. His father, Jimmy Moore, had been a standout player for the Aggies and is in the school's athletic Hall of Fame. Following his junior season, Moore declared his eligibility for the 2016 NBA draft, but opted to return for his senior season. As a senior, he was named second-team All-Mountain West Conference after averaging 16.6 points and 5.5 rebounds per game.

== Post-college ==
After going undrafted in the 2017 NBA draft, Moore was signed to a two-way contract by the Milwaukee Bucks of the NBA on July 8, 2017. On September 10, 2017, the Bucks requested waivers on Moore prior to the start of training camp. During this time, Moore was dealing with anxiety issues that were worsening after his time in college ended. In March 2018, Moore wrote an article for the athlete-centered media outlet The Players’ Tribune titled “The Toughest Call of my Life.” In the article, Moore detailed the issues with anxiety and anxiety attacks which plagued him throughout his college career and ultimately led him to leave the NBA before his career began.
