= J. P. Piper =

Biographical details
- Born: June 22, 1966 (age 60); Baton Rouge, Louisiana, U.S.

Coaching career (HC unless noted)
- 1992–1994: East Ascension HS (asst.)
- 1994–2002: The Dunham School
- 2002–2004: Nicholls State (asst.)
- 2004–2016: Nicholls State

John-Paul "J. P." Piper (born June 22, 1966) is the former head men's basketball coach at Nicholls State University in Thibodaux, Louisiana. Piper was fired on March 29, 2016.

== Head coaching record ==
Record table
Season	Team	Overall	Conference	Standing	Postseason
Nicholls State Colonels (Southland Conference) (2004–2016)
2004–05	Nicholls State	6–21	1–15	11th	
2005–06	Nicholls State	9–18	5–11	10th	
2006–07	Nicholls State	8–22	7–9	5th	
2007–08	Nicholls State	10–21	5–11	5th	
2008–09	Nicholls State	20–11	12–4	2nd	
2009–10	Nicholls State	11–19	7–9	3rd	
2010–11	Nicholls State	14–14	8–8	4th	
2011–12	Nicholls State	10–20	6–10	4th	
2012–13	Nicholls State	9–21	8–10	5th	
2013–14	Nicholls State	14–15	10–8	6th	
2014–15	Nicholls State	10–19	7–11	T–8th	
2015–16	Nicholls State	11–23	6–12	T–9th	
Nicholls State:		132–224 (.371)	82–118 (.410)		
Total:		132–224 (.371)			
National champion Postseason invitational champion Conference regular season champion Conference regular season and conference tournament champion Division regular season champion Division regular season and conference tournament champion Conference tournament champion
