= 2014–15 Nicholls State Colonels men's basketball team =

American college basketball season

2014–15 Nicholls State Colonels men's basketball
- Conference: Southland Conference
- Record: 10–19 (7–11 Southland)
- Head coach: J. P. Piper (11th season)
- Assistant coaches: Rennie Bailey; David Amata; Mike Lenzly
- Home arena: Stopher Gym (Capacity: 3,800)

2014–15 Southland Conference men's basketball standings
	Conf.				Overall
Team	W		L	PCT	W		L	PCT
Stephen F. Austin †	17	–	1	.944	29	–	5	.853
Sam Houston State	15	–	3	.833	26	–	9	.743
Texas A&M–CC	13	–	5	.722	20	–	14	.588
Northwestern State	13	–	5	.722	19	–	13	.594
Incarnate Word**	10	–	8	.556	18	–	11	.621
Lamar*	9	–	9	.500	15	–	15	.500
McNeese State	8	–	10	.444	15	–	16	.484
Houston Baptist*	7	–	11	.389	12	–	16	.429
Nicholls State	7	–	11	.389	10	–	19	.345
New Orleans	6	–	12	.333	11	–	18	.379
Southeastern Louisiana	6	–	12	.333	9	–	23	.281
Abilene Christian**	4	–	14	.222	10	–	21	.323
Central Arkansas*	2	–	16	.111	2	–	27	.069
† 2015 Southland tournament winner * ineligible for postseason due to APR penalties ** ineligible for postseason due to Div. I transition

The 2014–15 Nicholls State Colonels men's basketball team represented Nicholls State University during the 2014–15 NCAA Division I men's basketball season. The Colonels, led by eleventh year head coach J. P. Piper, played their home games at Stopher Gym and are members of the Southland Conference.

The Colonels were picked to finish eighth (8th) in both the Southland Conference Coaches' Poll and the Sports Information Directors Poll.

The Colonels were the sixth seed in the 2015 Southland Conference tournament due to ineligibility of three teams which finished higher in conference play. In the first game of the tournament, the Colonels played the seventh seeded New Orleans Privateers losing 73–82. The Colonels finished the season with a 10–19 overall record and a 7–11 record in conference play tied for eighth place.

== Roster ==
ֶ

2014–15 Nicholls State Colonels men's basketball team
Players
Coaches

Pos.	#	Name	Height	Weight	Year	Previous school	Hometown
G	1	Marquis Nelson	5 ft 10 in (1.78 m)	160 lb (73 kg)	Fr	Helen Cox HS	New Orleans, LA
F	2	Lachian Prest	6 ft 7 in (2.01 m)	209 lb (95 kg)	RS Jr	Scotch College	Flagstaff Hill, Australia
F	3	Denzel Flemmings	6 ft 8 in (2.03 m)	230 lb (104 kg)	Jr	Scotch College	Adelaide, Australia
F	4	Chad Simpson	6 ft 7 in (2.01 m)	205 lb (93 kg)	Fr	Scotch College	Perth, Australia
G	5	Amin Torres	6 ft 1 in (1.85 m)	175 lb (79 kg)	Jr	Conquering Word Christian Academy	New Orleans, LA
G	10	Zach Young	6 ft 0 in (1.83 m)	165 lb (75 kg)	Fr	Impact Academy	Wellington, New Zealand
F	11	Adam Ward	6 ft 6 in (1.98 m)	205 lb (93 kg)	Jr	Lee College	Houston, TX
G	12	Richie Lewis	6 ft 0 in (1.83 m)	170 lb (77 kg)	So	Oakland Community College	Flint, MI
F	13	Travis Julien	6 ft 7 in (2.01 m)	190 lb (86 kg)	RS Jr	St. Edward High School (Louisiana)	Vacherie, LA
F	14	Ja'Dante' Frye	6 ft 4 in (1.93 m)	180 lb (82 kg)	RS Fr	E.D. White HS	Thibodaux, LA
F	15	Sam McBeath	6 ft 9 in (2.06 m)	225 lb (102 kg)	RS Jr	Cambelltown HS	Sydney, Australia
F	20	Cade Towers	6 ft 2 in (1.88 m)	195 lb (88 kg)	So	Lake Ginninderra College	Queensland, Australia
G	21	Shane Rillieux	6 ft 2 in (1.88 m)	190 lb (86 kg)	Sr	Brother Martin HS	New Orleans, LA
G	22	T. J. Carpenter	6 ft 4 in (1.93 m)	200 lb (91 kg)	Jr	Lakeside HS	Sibley, LA
F	24	Liam Thomas	6 ft 10 in (2.08 m)	195 lb (88 kg)	So	Central Private School	Sydney, Australia
F	32	JaMarkus Horace	6 ft 6 in (1.98 m)	180 lb (82 kg)	Jr	Stephen F. Austin HS	Sugar Land, TX
F	44	Luka Kamber	6 ft 7 in (2.01 m)	190 lb (86 kg)	So	Louisiana-Lafayette	Berlin, Germany

Head coach

- J. P. Piper

Assistant coach(es)

- Rennie Bailey
- David Amata
- Mike Lenzly

Legend

- (C) Team captain
- (S) Suspended
- (I) Ineligible
- (W) Walk-on
- Injured
- Current redshirt

Roster
Last update: 09/23/2014

== Schedule ==
Date time, TV	Opponent	Result	Record	Site (attendance) city, state
Exhibition
11/12/2014*; 6:30 pm	Mobile	W 92–65		Stopher Gym (689); Thibodaux, LA
Out of Conference
11/17/2014*; 7:30 pm	at North Texas	L 57–71	0–1	UNT Coliseum (1,367); Denton, TX
11/20/2014*; 10:00 pm, P12N	at UCLA	L 74–107	0–2	Pauley Pavilion (5,231); Los Angeles, CA
11/24/2014*; 6:00 pm, ESPN3	at Wake Forest	L 48–75	0–3	Lawrence Joel Veterans Memorial Coliseum (6,045); Winston-Salem, NC
11/29/2014*; 3:00 pm, BTN	at No. 19 Michigan	L 62–91	0–4	Crisler Center (11,139); Ann Arbor, MI
12/6/2014*; 3:30 pm	Loyola (New Orleans)	W 89–60	1–4	Stopher (722); Thibodaux, LA
12/13/2014*; 2:00 pm, BTN	No. 5 Wisconsin	L 43–86	1–5	Kohl Center (17,279); Madison, WI
12/16/2014*; 6:30 pm	Arkansas–Monticello	W 81–75	2–5	Stopher Gym (713); Thibodaux, LA
12/18/2014*; 6:30 pm	at Louisiana Tech	L 54–79	2–6	Thomas Assembly Center (3,918); Ruston, LA
12/21/2014*; 3:30 pm	Troy	L 64–65	2–7	Stopher Gym (649); Thibodaux, LA
12/30/2014*; 6:30 pm	Spring Hill	W 71–64	3–7	Stopher Gym (638); Thibodaux, LA
Conference Games
01/03/2015; 6:00 pm	at Lamar	L 62–75	3–8 (0–1)	Montagne Center (1,877); Beaumont, TX
01/10/2015; 4:00 pm	at Abilene Christian	L 54–71	3–9 (0–2)	Moody Coliseum (540); Abilene, TX
01/13/2015; 6:30 pm	Houston Baptist	W 61–57	4–9 (1–2)	Stopher Gym (849); Thibodaux, LA
01/17/2015; 3:30 pm	Texas A&M–Corpus Christi	L 66–69	4–10 (1–3)	Stopher Gym (785); Thibodaux, LA
01/20/2015; 6:30 pm	Sam Houston State	L 39–62	4–11 (1–4)	Stopher Gym (1,027); Thibodaux, LA
01/24/2015; 4:00 pm	at Central Arkansas	W 71–61	5–11 (2–4)	Farris Center (1,178); Conway, AR
01/26/2015; 6:30 pm	at Northwestern State	L 51–80	5–12 (2–5)	Prather Coliseum (2,018); Natchitoches, LA
01/31/2015; 3:30 pm	Incarnate Word	L 58–69	5–13 (2–6)	Stopher Gym (768); Thibodaux, LA
02/02/2014; 6:30 pm	New Orleans	W 67–55	6–13 (3–6)	Stopher Gym (1,113); Thibodaux, LA
02/07/2015; 3:30 pm	McNeese State	W 70–59	7–13 (4–6)	Stopher Gym (692); Thibodaux, LA
02/10/2015; 7:00 pm	at Incarnate Word	L 64–73	7–14 (4–7)	McDermott Center (510); San Antonio, TX
02/14/2015; 3:30 pm	Southeastern Louisiana	L 59–65	7–15 (4–8)	Stopher Gym (418); Thibodaux, LA
02/21/2015; 6:00 pm	at Stephen F. Austin	L 71–86	7–16 (4–9)	William R. Johnson Coliseum (4,716); Nacogdoches, TX
02/23/2015; 6:30 pm	Northwestern State	L 57–79	7–17 (4–10)	Stopher Gym (791); Thibodaux, LA
02/28/2015; 3:00 pm, ESPN3	at McNeese State	L 68–73 ^{OT}	7–18 (4–11)	Burton Coliseum (1,563); Lake Charles, LA
03/02/2015; 7:45 pm	at New Orleans	W 89–79	8–18 (5–11)	Lakefront Arena (609); New Orleans, LA
03/05/2015; 7:30 pm	Central Arkansas	W 77–70	9–18 (6–11)	Stopher Gym (815); Thibodaux, LA
03/07/2015; 7:30 pm	at Southeastern Louisiana	W 75-69	10-18 (7-11)	University Center (659); Hammond, LA
Southland tournament
03/11/2015; 7:30 pm	vs. New Orleans	L 73–82	10–19	Merrell Center (1,029); Katy, TX
*Non-conference game. ^{#}Rankings from AP Poll. (#) Tournament seedings in parentheses. All times are in Central Time.

== See also ==
- 2014–15 Nicholls State Colonels women's basketball team
