= 2014–15 McNeese State Cowboys basketball team =

American college basketball season

2014–15 McNeese State Cowboys basketball
- Conference: Southland Conference
- Record: 15–16 (8–10 Southland)
- Head coach: Dave Simmons (9th season)
- Assistant coaches: David Dumars; Steve Welch; Preston David
- Home arena: Burton Coliseum (Capacity: 8,000)

2014–15 Southland Conference men's basketball standings
	Conf.				Overall
Team	W		L	PCT	W		L	PCT
Stephen F. Austin †	17	–	1	.944	29	–	5	.853
Sam Houston State	15	–	3	.833	26	–	9	.743
Texas A&M–CC	13	–	5	.722	20	–	14	.588
Northwestern State	13	–	5	.722	19	–	13	.594
Incarnate Word**	10	–	8	.556	18	–	11	.621
Lamar*	9	–	9	.500	15	–	15	.500
McNeese State	8	–	10	.444	15	–	16	.484
Houston Baptist*	7	–	11	.389	12	–	16	.429
Nicholls State	7	–	11	.389	10	–	19	.345
New Orleans	6	–	12	.333	11	–	18	.379
Southeastern Louisiana	6	–	12	.333	9	–	23	.281
Abilene Christian**	4	–	14	.222	10	–	21	.323
Central Arkansas*	2	–	16	.111	2	–	27	.069
† 2015 Southland tournament winner * ineligible for postseason due to APR penalties ** ineligible for postseason due to Div. I transition

The 2014–15 McNeese State Cowboys basketball team represented McNeese State University during the 2014–15 NCAA Division I men's basketball season. The Cowboys were led by eighth year head coach Dave Simmons and played their home games at Burton Coliseum, with three home games at Sudduth Coliseum in the Lake Charles Civic Center complex. The Cowboys are members of the Southland Conference.

The Cowboys were picked to finish fifth (5th) in both the Southland Conference Coaches' Poll and the Sports Information Directors Poll. The team finished with an overall record of 15–16 including a record of 1–1 in the 2015 Southland Conference Men's Basketball Tournament. The conference record for the 2014–15 season was 8–10 and finished in seventh place.

== Roster ==
ֶ

2014–15 McNeese State Cowboys men's basketball team
Players
Coaches

Pos.	#	Name	Height	Weight	Year	Previous school	Hometown
G	0	Shaun Johnson	5 ft 10 in (1.78 m)	178 lb (81 kg)	Jr	Pineville HS	Pineville, LA
G	2	Jamaya Burr	6 ft 0 in (1.83 m)	167 lb (76 kg)	So	Ruston HS	Ruston, LA
G	3	Keelan Garrett	6 ft 0 in (1.83 m)	180 lb (82 kg)	Sr	St. Louis Catholic HS; Nicholls State	Lake Charles, LA
PG	5	Marcus Mathieu	5 ft 11 in (1.8 m)	178 lb (81 kg)	RS Fr	Plano East Senior HS	Richardson, TX
F	10	Craig McFerrin	6 ft 7 in (2.01 m)	230 lb (104 kg)	Sr	Warren Harding HS (Ohio)	Baton Rouge, LA
G	11	Kevin Hardy	6 ft 2 in (1.88 m)	180 lb (82 kg)	Sr	St. Louis Catholic HS	Lake Charles, LA
F	13	Jordan Wells	6 ft 7 in (2.01 m)	250 lb (113 kg)	Jr	Little Cypress-Mauriceville HS	Orange, TX
C	15	Matthew Moss	6 ft 9 in (2.06 m)	212 lb (96 kg)	Jr	Charis Preparatory (Louisiana); Louisiana-Lafayette	Anacoco, LA
G	23	Derrell Joubert	6 ft 1 in (1.85 m)	180 lb (82 kg)	Fr	Northwest HS	Opelousas, LA
G/F	24	Lance Potier	6 ft 5 in (1.96 m)	189 lb (86 kg)	So	St. Martinville HS	St. Martinville, LA
G	31	Stephen Ugochukwu	6 ft 7 in (2.01 m)	210 lb (95 kg)	Fr	Argyle Liberty Christian	Lewisville, TX
F	32	Desharick Guidry	6 ft 5 in (1.96 m)	200 lb (91 kg)	Sr	Washington-Marion HS	Lake Charles, LA
G	35	Andrija Milovanovic	6 ft 5 in (1.96 m)	210 lb (95 kg)	So	Koledz Beograd HS	Belgrade, Serbia
F	44	Austin Lewis	6 ft 8 in (2.03 m)	215 lb (98 kg)	Jr	Westfield HS	Houston, TX

Head coach

- Dave Simmons

Assistant coach(es)

- David Dumars
- Steve Welch
- Preston David

Legend

- (C) Team captain
- (S) Suspended
- (I) Ineligible
- (W) Walk-on
- Injured
- Current redshirt

Roster
Last update: 09/23/2014

== Schedule and results ==
Date time, TV	Opponent	Result	Record	Site (attendance) city, state
Out of Conference
11/14/2014*; 8:30 pm, FSN	at Baylor	L 39–80	0–1	Ferrell Center (6,158); Waco, TX
11/18/2014*; 7:00 pm	Louisiana College	W 90–63	1–1	Burton Coliseum (544); Lake Charles, LA
11/21/2014*; 7:00 pm	Jarvis Christian	W 85–70	2–1	Burton Coliseum (403); Lake Charles, LA
11/29/2014*; 7:00 pm, SECN	at LSU	L 72–83	2–2	Pete Maravich Assembly Center (7,034); Baton Rouge, LA
12/03/2014*; 8:00 pm	Southern–New Orleans	W 74–63	3–2	Burton Coliseum (477); Lake Charles, LA
12/06/2014*; 7:00 pm	Louisiana–Lafayette	W 80–70	4–2	Burton Coliseum (1,086); Lake Charles, LA
12/13/2014*; 7:00 pm	at TCU	L 50–68	4–3	Wilkerson-Greines Activity Center (3,978); Fort Worth, TX
12/16/2014*; 7:00 pm	LSU–Alexandria	W 84–68	5–3	Burton Coliseum (474); Lake Charles, LA
12/20/2014*; 1:00 pm	Toledo	L 69–83	5–4	Burton Coliseum (391); Lake Charles, LA
12/22/2014*; 7:00 pm	Central Michigan	L 58–87	5–5	Burton Coliseum (567); Lake Charles, LA
12/30/2014*; 7:00 pm, SEC+	at Mississippi State	W 66–47	6–5	Humphrey Coliseum (5,155); Starkville, MS
Conference Games
01/03/2015; 3:00 pm	Stephen F. Austin	L 75–80	6–6 (0–1)	Burton Coliseum (1,417); Lake Charles, LA
01/05/2015; 7:00 pm	Houston Baptist	L 56–68	6–7 (0–2)	Burton Coliseum (1,104); Lake Charles, LA
01/10/2015; 7:00 pm	at Texas A&M–Corpus Christi	L 61–71	6–8 (0–3)	American Bank Center (488); Corpus Christi, TX
01/17/2015; 4:30 pm	at Sam Houston State	L 60–69	6–9 (0–4)	Bernard Johnson Coliseum (1,540); Huntsville, TX
01/20/2015; 7:00 pm	Abilene Christian	W 63–56	7–9 (1–4)	Burton Coliseum (1,048); Lake Charles, LA
01/24/2015; 3:00 pm	at Northwestern State	L 67–93	7–10 (1–5)	Prather Coliseum (2,712); Natchitoches, LA
01/26/2015; 7:30 pm	at Incarnate Word	L 84–86	7–11 (1–6)	McDermott Center (672); San Antonio, TX
01/31/2015; 3:00 pm	New Orleans	W 68–61	8–11 (2–6)	Burton Coliseum (2,128); Lake Charles, LA
02/02/2015; 7:00 pm	at Southeastern Louisiana	W 73–60	9–11 (3–6)	University Center (700); Hammond, LA
02/07/2015; 3:30 pm	at Nicholls State	L 59–70	9–12 (3–7)	Stopher Gym (692); Thibodaux, LA
02/09/2015; 7:00 pm	at New Orleans	L 71–81	9–13 (3–8)	Lakefront Arena (493); New Orleans, LA
02/14/2015; 3:00 pm	Northwestern State	L 72–75	9–14 (3–9)	Burton Coliseum (1,336); Lake Charles, LA
02/16/2015; 7:00 pm	Southeastern Louisiana	W 74–69	10–14 (4–9)	Burton Coliseum (945); Lake Charles, LA
02/21/2015; 6:00 pm	at Lamar	L 53–58	10–15 (4–10)	Montagne Center (3,543); Beaumont, TX
02/24/2015; 7:00 pm	at Central Arkansas	W 77–60	11–15 (5–10)	Farris Center (895); Conway, AR
02/28/2015; 3:00 pm, ESPN3	Nicholls State	W 83–78 ^{OT}	12–15 (6–10)	Burton Coliseum (1,563); Lake Charles, LA
03/02/2015; 7:00 pm, RTSW	Lamar	W 70–69	13–15 (7–10)	Burton Coliseum (1,201); Lake Charles, LA
03/08/2015; 1:00 pm	Central Arkansas	W 70–68	14–15 (8–10)	Burton Coliseum (1,065); Lake Charles, LA
Southland tournament
03/11/2015; 5:00 pm	vs. Southeastern Louisiana	W 62–60 ^{OT}	15–15	Merrell Center (1,029); Katy, TX
03/12/2015; 5:00 pm	vs. Northwestern State	L 89–96	15–16	Merrell Center (1,213); Katy, TX
*Non-conference game. ^{#}Rankings from AP Poll. (#) Tournament seedings in parentheses. All times are in Central Time.

== See also ==
- 2014–15 McNeese State Cowgirls basketball team
