= 2015 Southland Conference men's basketball tournament =

2015 basketball tournament

- Tournament logo
- Classification: Division I
- Season: 2014–15
- Teams: 8
- Site: Merrell Center; Katy, Texas
- Champions: Stephen F. Austin (3rd title)
- Winning coach: Brad Underwood (2nd title)
- MVP: Thomas Walkup (Stephen F. Austin)
- Attendance: 10,526 (total); 5,016 (championship)
- Television: SLCDN, ESPN3, ESPN2

2014–15 Southland Conference men's basketball standings
	Conf.				Overall
Team	W		L	PCT	W		L	PCT
Stephen F. Austin †	17	–	1	.944	29	–	5	.853
Sam Houston State	15	–	3	.833	26	–	9	.743
Texas A&M–CC	13	–	5	.722	20	–	14	.588
Northwestern State	13	–	5	.722	19	–	13	.594
Incarnate Word**	10	–	8	.556	18	–	11	.621
Lamar*	9	–	9	.500	15	–	15	.500
McNeese State	8	–	10	.444	15	–	16	.484
Houston Baptist*	7	–	11	.389	12	–	16	.429
Nicholls State	7	–	11	.389	10	–	19	.345
New Orleans	6	–	12	.333	11	–	18	.379
Southeastern Louisiana	6	–	12	.333	9	–	23	.281
Abilene Christian**	4	–	14	.222	10	–	21	.323
Central Arkansas*	2	–	16	.111	2	–	27	.069
† 2015 Southland tournament winner * ineligible for postseason due to APR penalties ** ineligible for postseason due to Div. I transition

The 2015 Southland Conference men's basketball tournament, a part of the 2014–15 NCAA Division I men's basketball season, took place March 11–14 at the Merrell Center in Katy, Texas. The winner of the tournament received the Southland Conference's automatic bid to the 2015 NCAA tournament. Two programs in their second year of the transition from NCAA Division II to Division I, Abilene Christian and Incarnate Word, were ineligible for the tournament. Three programs were ineligible for the tournament for failure to meet enhanced NCAA Academic Performance Rating (APR) requirements. Those teams were Central Arkansas, Houston Baptist, and Lamar. The three teams are part of a group of nine NCAA teams ineligible for 2015 post season basketball play. With the departure of Oral Roberts to the Summit League, only eight conference teams remain eligible for the tournament.

== Seeds ==
Only the top eight teams advanced to the Southland Conference tournament. If a team ineligible for the NCAA Tournament should finish in the top eight, its seed will fall to the next eligible team. Teams were seeded based on conference record and then a tie breaker system was used. The top two seeds received a double bye, and the third and fourth seeds received a single bye.

Seed	School	Conference	Overall	Tiebreaker
1	Stephen F. Austin‡*	17–1	27–4	
2	Sam Houston State*	15–3	24–7	
3	Texas A&M CC#	13–5	18–12	Played one game against Northwestern State. 1–1 vs. Stephen F. Austin
4	Northwestern St#	13–5	18–11	Played one game against Texas A&M–Corpus Christi. 0–2 vs. Stephen F. Austin
5	McNeese St	8–10	14–15	Incarnate Word and Lamar are ineligible. Starting with McNeese St, eligible teams move up.
6	Nicholls State	7–11	10–18	Houston Baptist ineligible. Starting with Nicholls State eligible teams move up.
7	New Orleans	6–12	10–17	2–0 vs. SE Louisiana
8	Southeastern Louisiana	6–12	9–22	0–2 vs. New Orleans
‡ Southland Conference regular season champions. * Receives a first-round and second-round bye in the conference tournament. # Receives a first-round bye in the conference tournament. Overall record as of end of regular season.

== Schedule ==
Session	Game	Time*	Matchup^{#}	Score	Television
First round – Wednesday, March 11
1	1	5:00 pm	#5 McNeese State vs. #8 Southeastern Louisiana	62–60	SLC Digital
1	2	7:30 pm	#6 Nicholls State vs. #7 New Orleans	82–73	SLC Digital
Quarterfinals – Thursday, March 12
2	3	5:00pm	#4 Northwestern St vs. #5 McNeese State	96–89	SLC Digital
2	4	7:30pm	#3 Texas A&M CC vs. #7 New Orleans	61–58	SLC Digital
Semifinals – Friday, March 13
3	5	5:00 pm	#1 Stephen F. Austin vs. #4 Northwestern St	91–79	ESPN3
3	6	7:30pm	#2 Sam Houston State vs. #3 Texas A&M CC	70–67	ESPN3
Championship – Saturday, March 14
4	7	8:30pm	#1 Stephen F. Austin vs. #2 Sam Houston State	83-70	ESPN2
*Game times in CST. #-Rankings denote tournament seeding.

== Bracket ==
First round Wednesday, March 11; SLC Digital
5	McNeese State	62*
8	Southeastern Louisiana	60
6	Nicholls State	73
7	New Orleans	82

Quarterfinals; Thursday, March 12; SLC Digital
4	Northwestern St	96
5	McNeese State	89
3	Texas A&M CC	61
7	New Orleans	58

Semifinals; Friday, March 13; ESPN3
1	Stephen F. Austin	91
4	Northwestern St	79
2	Sam Houston State	70
3	Texas A&M CC	67

Championship; Saturday, March 14; ESPN2
1	Stephen F. Austin	83
2	Sam Houston State	70

- denotes an overtime game

== Game summaries ==
SLC Digital Network

Mar 11
5:00 pm

Recap

McNeese State Cowboys 70, Southeastern Louisiana Lions 68 (OT)
Scoring by half: 27–27, 28–28 Overtime: 7–5
Pts: Keelan Garrett 14; Rebs: Austin Lewis 10; Asts: Kevin Hardy 4	Pts: Cedric Jenkins 27; Rebs: Onochie Ochie 11; Asts: Jimmie Duplessis 9

Merrell Center
Katy, TX
Attendance: 1,029
Referees: Brent Meaux; Gerald Williams; Mitchell Ervin

SLC Digital Network

Mar 11
7:30 pm

Recap

New Orleans Privateers 82, Nicholls Colonels 73
Scoring by half: 39–42, 43–31
Pts: Kevin Brown 24; Rebs: Kevin Hill 10; Asts: Tevin Broyles 5	Pts: Amin Torres 17; Rebs: Sam McBeath 13; Asts: Liam Thomas 4

Merrell Center
Katy, TX
Attendance: 1,029
Referees: Rob Wolff; Dave Cusick; KB Burdett

SLC Digital Network

Mar 12
5:00 pm

Recap

Northwestern State Demons 96, McNeese State Cowboys 89
Scoring by half: 41–34, 55–55
Pts: Zeek Woodley 34; Rebs: Zeek Woodley 9 Asts: Jalan West 12	Pts: Kevin Hardy 25; Rebs: Desharik Guidry 15; Asts: Kevin Hardy 5

Merrell Center
Katy, TX
Attendance: 1,213
Referees: Jeff Malham; Toby Martinez; Pat Boeh

SLC Digital Network

Mar 12
7:30 pm

Recap

Texas A&M–Corpus Christi Islanders 61, New Orleans Privateers 58
Scoring by half: 33–34, 28–24
Pts: John Jordan 22; Rebs: Rashawn Thomas 7 Asts: John Jordan 4	Pts: Nate Frye 20; Rebs: Travin Thibodeaux 12; Asts: Christavious Gill 2

Merrell Center
Katy, TX
Attendance: 1,213
Referees: Brad Fowler; Brent Dugas; Ross Cullins

ESPN3

Mar 13
5:00 pm

Recap

Stephen F. Austin Lumberjacks 91, Northwestern State Demons 79
Scoring by half: 45–41, 46–38
Pts: Ty Charles; Jared Johnson 16; Rebs: Jacob Parker 10; Asts: Thomas Walkup 7	Pts: Jalan West 25; Rebs: Zeek Woodley 8 Asts: Jalan West 9

Merrell Center
Katy, TX
Attendance: 3,268
Referees: Mike Thibodeaux; Rodrick Dixon; Ryan McDaniel

ESPN3

Mar 13
7:30 pm

Recap

Sam Houston State Bearkats 70, Texas A&M–Corpus Christi Islanders 67
Scoring by half: 21–29, 49–38
Pts: Jabari Peters 19; Rebs: Michael Holyfield 14; Asts: DeMarcus Gatlin 4	Pts: John Jordan 20; Rebs: Bryce Douvier 7 Asts: John Jordan 5

Merrell Center
Katy, TX
Attendance: 3,268
Referees: Sean Casey; Kelly Hunt; Marques Pettigrew

ESPN2

Mar 14
8:30 pm

Recap

Stephen F. Austin Lumberjacks 83, Sam Houston State Bearkats 70
Scoring by half: 37–27, 46–43
Pts: Thomas Walkup 24; Rebs: Thomas Walkup 8 Asts: Thomas Walkup 5	Pts: Michael Holyfield 18; Rebs: Michael Holyfield 12; Asts: 3 players for 3

Merrell Center
Katy, TX
Attendance: 5,016
Referees: Keith Kimble; Brent Meaux; James Durham

== Awards and honors ==
Tournament MVP: Thomas Walkup – Stephen F. Austin

All-Tournament Team:

- Thomas Walkup – Stephen F. Austin
- Jared Johnson – Stephen F. Austin
- Michael Holyfield – Sam Houston State
- Jabari Peters – Sam Houston State
- Zeek Woodley – Northwestern State

== See also ==
- 2015 Southland Conference women's basketball tournament
