= 2014–15 New Orleans Privateers men's basketball team =

American college basketball season

2014–15 New Orleans Privateers men's basketball
- Conference: Southland Conference
- Record: 11–18 (6–12 Southland)
- Head coach: Mark Slessinger (4th season)
- Assistant coaches: Kenyon Spears; Kris Arkenberg; Kerwin Forges
- Home arena: Lakefront Arena (Capacity: 10,000)

2014–15 Southland Conference men's basketball standings
	Conf.				Overall
Team	W		L	PCT	W		L	PCT
Stephen F. Austin †	17	–	1	.944	29	–	5	.853
Sam Houston State	15	–	3	.833	26	–	9	.743
Texas A&M–CC	13	–	5	.722	20	–	14	.588
Northwestern State	13	–	5	.722	19	–	13	.594
Incarnate Word**	10	–	8	.556	18	–	11	.621
Lamar*	9	–	9	.500	15	–	15	.500
McNeese State	8	–	10	.444	15	–	16	.484
Houston Baptist*	7	–	11	.389	12	–	16	.429
Nicholls State	7	–	11	.389	10	–	19	.345
New Orleans	6	–	12	.333	11	–	18	.379
Southeastern Louisiana	6	–	12	.333	9	–	23	.281
Abilene Christian**	4	–	14	.222	10	–	21	.323
Central Arkansas*	2	–	16	.111	2	–	27	.069
† 2015 Southland tournament winner * ineligible for postseason due to APR penalties ** ineligible for postseason due to Div. I transition

The 2014–15 New Orleans Privateers men's basketball team represented the University of New Orleans during the 2014–15 NCAA Division I men's basketball season. The Privateers were led by fourth year head coach Mark Slessinger and played their home games at Lakefront Arena. They were new members of the Southland Conference.

The Privateers were picked to finish ninth (9th) in both the Southland Conference Coaches' Poll and the Sports Information Directors Poll. The team finished the season with an 11–18 overall record including a record of 1–1 in the 2015 Southland Conference Men's Basketball Tournament. The Privateers finished conference play tied for tenth place with a final record of 6–12.

== Roster ==
2014–15 New Orleans Privateers men's basketball team
Players
Coaches

Pos.	#	Name	Height	Weight	Year	Previous school	Hometown
F	0	Bryce Jackson	6 ft 6 in (1.98 m)	200 lb (91 kg)	Fr	Fossil Ridge HS	Keller, TX
G	1	Tevin Broyles	6 ft 4 in (1.93 m)	210 lb (95 kg)	So	Gautier HS	Gautier, MS
G	2	Kevin Brown	6 ft 2 in (1.88 m)	195 lb (88 kg)	Sr	Elsik HS; Louisiana-Lafayette	Houston, TX
G	3	Nate Frye	6 ft 1 in (1.85 m)	205 lb (93 kg)	So	Houma Christian HS	Houma, LA
F	4	Kevin Hill	6 ft 7 in (2.01 m)	210 lb (95 kg)	Jr	John Ehret HS	Westwego, LA
G	5	Christavious Gill	5 ft 8 in (1.73 m)	165 lb (75 kg)	So	Alexandria HS	Alexandria, LA
G/F	11	Michael Zeno	6 ft 6 in (1.98 m)	215 lb (98 kg)	Fr	Westbrook HS	Beaumont, TX
G/F	13	Colton Weisbrod	6 ft 5 in (1.96 m)	215 lb (98 kg)		Nederland HS	Nederland, TX
F	14	Terrance Syon	6 ft 6 in (1.98 m)	215 lb (98 kg)	Sr	North Crowley HS; Navarro JC	Ft. Worth, TX
G/F	20	Evans Ganapamo	6 ft 5 in (1.96 m)	185 lb (84 kg)	Jr	Mandeville HS	France
F	25	Trevin Thibodeaux	6 ft 8 in (2.03 m)	220 lb (100 kg)	Fr	Brusly HS	Plaquemine, LA
G	31	Kenneth Terry	6 ft 0 in (1.83 m)	175 lb (79 kg)	Fr	McKinley HS	Baton Rouge, LA
F	33	Dalton Galpion	6 ft 7 in (2.01 m)	195 lb (88 kg)	Fr	St. Augustine	New Orleans, LA
C	45	Travis Avery	6 ft 8 in (2.03 m)	215 lb (98 kg)	Jr	Country Day	Algiers, LA

Head coach

- Mark Slessinger (Aurora)

Assistant coach(es)

- Kenyon Spears (Lamar)
- Kris Arkenberg (Franklin (IN))
- Kerwin Forges (Northwestern State)

Legend

- (C) Team captain
- (S) Suspended
- (I) Ineligible
- (W) Walk-on
- Injured
- Current redshirt

Roster
Last update: 2014-09-23

== Schedule ==
Date time, TV	Opponent	Result	Record	Site (attendance) city, state
Out of Conference
11/18/2014*; 7:45 pm	Pensacola Christian	W 88–61	1–0	Lakefront Arena (856); New Orleans, LA
11/20/2014*; 7:00 pm	at TCU	L 71–86	1–1	Wilkerson-Greines Activity Center (3,425); Fort Worth, TX
11/28/2014*; 12:00 pm, SECN	at Texas A&M	L 65–87	1–2	Reed Arena (5,281); College Station, TX
11/30/2014*; 2:00 pm	at Denver	L 60–79	2–2	Magness Arena (1,468); Denver, CO
12/06/2014*; 6:15 pm	Crowley's Ridge	W 100–85	2–3	Lakefront Arena (983); New Orleans, LA
12/13/2014*; 9:30 pm	at San Diego	L 60–85	2–4	Jenny Craig Pavilion (1,662); San Diego, CA
12/19/2014*; 7:05 pm	at Southern Illinois	W 56–52	3–4	SIU Arena (4,485); Carbondale, IL
12/22/2014*; 6:05 pm, BTNPlus	at Indiana	L 59–79	3–5	Assembly Hall (13,182); Bloomington, IL
12/30/2014*; 7:45 pm	Central Baptist	W 90–60	4–5	Lakefront Arena (512); Lake Charles, LA
Conference Games
01/05/2015; 7:45 pm	Lamar	W 72–67	5–5 (1–0)	Lakefront Arena (581); New Orleans, LA
01/10/2015; 6:15 pm	Sam Houston State	L 62–68	5–6 (1–1)	Lakefront Arena (806); New Orleans, LA
01/12/2015; 7:30 pm	at Incarnate Word	L 66–97	5–7 (1–2)	McDermott Center (412); San Antonio, TX
01/17/2015; 7:00 pm	at Houston Baptist	L 73–74	5–8 (1–3)	Sharp Gymnasium (907); Houston, TX
01/19/2015; 7:00 pm	at Stephen F. Austin	L 54–79	5–9 (1–4)	William R. Johnson Coliseum (5,124); Nacogdoches, TX
01/24/2015; 6:15 pm	Texas A&M–Corpus Christi	L 67–71 ^{OT}	5–10 (1–5)	Lakefront Arena (1,079); New Orleans, LA
01/26/2015; 7:00 pm	Central Arkansas	W 87–67	6–10 (2–5)	Lakefront Arena (340); New Orleans, LA
01/31/2015; 3:00 pm	at McNeese State	L 61–68	6–11 (2–6)	Burton Coliseum (2,128); Lake Charles, LA
02/02/2015; 7:30 pm	at Nicholls State	L 55–67	6–12 (2–7)	Stopher Gym (1,113); Thibodaux, LA
02/07/2015; 4:00 pm, ESPN3	at Central Arkansas	L 67–70	6–13 (2–8)	Farris Center (985); Conway, AR
02/09/2015; 7:00 pm	McNeese State	W 81–71	7–13 (3–8)	Lakefront Arena (493); New Orleans, LA
02/16/2015; 7:00 pm	Texas A&M–Corpus Christi	L 53–55	7–14 (3–9)	Lakefront Arena (1,270); New Orleans, LA
02/21/2015; 6:15 pm	at Northwestern State	L 84–87	7–15 (3–10)	Lakefront Arena (510); New Orleans, LA
02/23/2015; 7:00 pm	at Southeastern Louisiana	W 74–73	8–15 (4–10)	University Center (749); Hammond, LA
02/28/2015; 6:15 pm	at Abilene Christian	W 75–55	9–15 (5–10)	Lakefront Arena (879); New Orleans, LA
03/02/2015; 7:00 pm	Nicholls State	L 79–89	9–16 (5–11)	Lakefront Arena (609); New Orleans, LA
03/05/2015; 7:45 pm	Southeastern Louisiana	W 85–79	10–16 (6–11)	Lakefront Arena (1,048); New Orleans, LA
03/07/2015; 3:00 pm	at Northwestern State	L 78–88	10–17 (6–12)	Prather Coliseum (2,442); Natchitoches, LA
Southland tournament
03/11/2015; 7:30 pm	vs. Nicholls State	W 82–73	11–17	Merrell Center (1,029); Katy, TX
03/12/2015; 7:30 pm	vs. Texas A&M–Corpus Christi	L 58–61	11–18	Merrell Center (1,213); Katy, TX
*Non-conference game. ^{#}Rankings from AP Poll. (#) Tournament seedings in parentheses. All times are in Central Time.

== See also ==
- 2014–15 New Orleans Privateers women's basketball team
