= 2014–15 Texas A&M–Corpus Christi Islanders men's basketball team =

American college basketball season

2014–15 Texas A&M–Corpus Christi Islanders men's basketball

CIT, Second round
- Conference: Southland Conference
- Record: 20–14 (13–5 Southland)
- Head coach: Willis Wilson (4th season)
- Assistant coaches: Marty Gross; Mark Dannhoff; Yaphett King
- Home arena: American Bank Center (Capacity: 8,280); Dugan Wellness Center

2014–15 Southland Conference men's basketball standings
	Conf.				Overall
Team	W		L	PCT	W		L	PCT
Stephen F. Austin †	17	–	1	.944	29	–	5	.853
Sam Houston State	15	–	3	.833	26	–	9	.743
Texas A&M–CC	13	–	5	.722	20	–	14	.588
Northwestern State	13	–	5	.722	19	–	13	.594
Incarnate Word**	10	–	8	.556	18	–	11	.621
Lamar*	9	–	9	.500	15	–	15	.500
McNeese State	8	–	10	.444	15	–	16	.484
Houston Baptist*	7	–	11	.389	12	–	16	.429
Nicholls State	7	–	11	.389	10	–	19	.345
New Orleans	6	–	12	.333	11	–	18	.379
Southeastern Louisiana	6	–	12	.333	9	–	23	.281
Abilene Christian**	4	–	14	.222	10	–	21	.323
Central Arkansas*	2	–	16	.111	2	–	27	.069
† 2015 Southland tournament winner * ineligible for postseason due to APR penalties ** ineligible for postseason due to Div. I transition

The 2014–15 Texas A&M–Corpus Christi Islanders men's basketball team represented Texas A&M University–Corpus Christi in the 2014–15 NCAA Division I men's basketball season. This was head coach Willis Wilson's fourth season at Texas A&M–Corpus Christi. The Islanders are members of the Southland Conference and played their home games at the American Bank Center and the Dugan Wellness Center.

The Islanders were picked to finish fourth (4th) in the Southland Conference Coaches' Poll and tied for third (3rd) in the Sports Information Director Poll. They received one first place vote in the SID poll.

They finished the season 20–14, 13–5 in Southland play to finish in a tie for third place. They advanced to the semifinals of the Southland tournament where they lost to Sam Houston State. They were invited to the CollegeInsider.com Tournament where they defeated Florida Gulf Coast in the first round before losing in the second round to Kent State.

== Media ==
Texas A&M–Corpus Christi men's basketball airs on KKTX with Steven King on the call all season long. Video streaming of all non-televised home games is available at GoIslanders.com.

== Roster ==
2014–15 Texas A&M–Corpus Christi Islanders men's basketball team
Players
Coaches

Pos.	#	Name	Height	Weight	Year	Previous school	Hometown
G	0	Brandon Pye	6 ft 0 in (1.83 m)	175 lb (79 kg)	Jr	Timberview HS	Mansfield, TX
G	1	Hameed Ali	6 ft 2 in (1.88 m)	170 lb (77 kg)	Sr	San Leandro HS	Hayward, CA
G	2	Cole Martinez	6 ft 2 in (1.88 m)	190 lb (86 kg)	Jr	Air Force Academy Prep	San Antonio, TX
G	3	Joe Kilgore	6 ft 5 in (1.96 m)	185 lb (84 kg)	Fr	Dekaney HS	Spring, TX
G	4	Ehab Amin	6 ft 3 in (1.91 m)	185 lb (84 kg)	Fr	St. John's Military Academy	Alexandria, Egypt
F	5	T. J. Traylor	6 ft 8 in (2.03 m)	200 lb (91 kg)	Jr	Dominguez HS	Los Angeles, CA
G	10	Johnathan Jordan	5 ft 10 in (1.78 m)	180 lb (82 kg)	Sr	Hightower HS	Houston, TX
G	11	Jelani Currie	6 ft 4 in (1.93 m)	180 lb (82 kg)	Jr	Albany Academy	Albany, NY
G	15	David Bloom	6 ft 4 in (1.93 m)	205 lb (93 kg)	Fr	Prince of Peace Christian High School	Plano, TX
G	22	Emmanuel Toney	6 ft 3 in (1.91 m)	175 lb (79 kg)	So	Annapolis Area Christian	Annapolis, MD
F	23	Bryce Douvier	6 ft 7 in (2.01 m)	230 lb (104 kg)	RS Jr	Sedgwick HS; Northern Colorado	Sedgwick, KS
F	25	Rashawn Thomas	6 ft 7 in (2.01 m)	245 lb (111 kg)	So	Southeast HS	Oklahoma City, OK
F	31	Viktor Juricek	6 ft 11 in (2.11 m)	210 lb (95 kg)	Jr	Canarias Basketball Academy	Prievidza, Slovakia
F	34	Dale Francis	6 ft 8 in (2.03 m)	230 lb (104 kg)	Jr	Canarias Basketball Academy	Leighton Buzzard, England

Head coach

- Willis Wilson (Rice)

Assistant coach(es)

- Marty Gross (Jacksonville)
- Mark Dannhoff (UW–La Crosse)
- Yaphett King (Cal State Fullerton)

Legend

- (C) Team captain
- (S) Suspended
- (I) Ineligible
- (W) Walk-on
- Injured
- Current redshirt

Roster
Last update: 2014-09-26

== Schedule and results ==
Date time, TV	Opponent	Result	Record	Site (attendance) city, state
Out of Conference
11/14/2014*; 7:00 pm	Our Lady of the Lake	W 73–58	1–0	American Bank Center (1,336); Corpus Christi, TX
11/18/2014*; 6:00 pm, FS2	at Georgetown	L 62–78	1–1	Verizon Center (4,887); Washington, D.C.
11/23/2014*; 1:00 pm	at Saint Louis; Corpus Christi Coastal Classic	W 62–56	2–1	Chaifetz Arena (6,620); St. Louis, MO
11/25/2014*; 7:00 pm	at Bradley; Corpus Christi Coastal Classic	L 38–62	2–2	Carver Arena (5,507); Peoria, IL
11/28/2014*; 3:00 pm	Mississippi Valley State; Corpus Christi Coastal Classic	W 75–66	3–2	American Bank Center (2,385); Corpus Christi, TX
11/29/2014*; 2:00 pm	Radford; Corpus Christi Coastal Classic	L 46–57	3–3	American Bank Center (6,039); Corpus Christi, TX
12/06/2014*; 1:00 pm	Denver	L 48–64	3–4	American Bank Center (1,064); Corpus Christi, TX
12/15/2014*; 7:30 pm	UTSA	L 60–73	3–5	American Bank Center (1,019); Corpus Christi, TX
12/17/2014*; 8:00 pm	at Denver	L 73–83	3–6	Magness Arena (740); Denver, CO
12/20/2014*; 9:00 pm	at Cal State Northridge	W 75–68	4–6	Matadome (550); Northridge, CA
12/22/2014*; 9:00 pm	at Cal State Fullerton	L 77–82	4–7	Titan Gym (578); Fullerton, CA
12/30/2014*; 7:30 pm	Jarvis Christian	W 87–55	5–7	American Bank Center (929); Corpus Christi, TX
Conference Games
01/06/2015; 8:00 pm	at Central Arkansas	W 77–70	6–7 (1–0)	Farris Center (752); Conway, AR
01/10/2015; 7:00 pm	McNeese State	W 71–61	7–7 (2–0)	Dugan Wellness Center (488); Corpus Christi, TX
01/12/2015; 7:00 pm	Lamar	L 64–66	7–8 (2–1)	American Bank Center (824); Corpus Christi, TX
01/17/2015; 3:30 pm	at Nicholls State	W 69–66	8–8 (3–1)	Stopher Gym (785); Thibodaux, LA
01/20/2015; 7:00 pm	Northwestern State	W 88–76	9–8 (4–1)	American Bank Center (945); Corpus Christi, TX
01/24/2015; 6:15 pm	at New Orleans	W 71–67 ^{OT}	10–8 (5–1)	Lakefront Arena (1,079); New Orleans, LA
01/26/2015; 7:00 pm	at Southeastern Louisiana	W 70–61	11–8 (6–1)	University Center (615); Hammond, LA
01/31/2015; 6:00 pm	at Stephen F. Austin	L 51–61	11–9 (6–2)	William R. Johnson Coliseum (5,512); Nacogdoches, TX
02/03/2015; 7:00 pm	Incarnate Word	W 71–70	12–9 (7–2)	American Bank Center (1,283); Corpus Christi, TX
02/07/2015; 4:30 pm	at Sam Houston State	L 59–67	12–10 (7–3)	Bernard Johnson Coliseum (2,097); Huntsville, TX
02/09/2015; 7:00 pm	at Houston Baptist	L 66–77	12–11 (7–4)	Sharp Gymnasium (902); Houston, TX
02/14/2015; 3:30 pm, ESPN3	Stephen F. Austin	W 71–63	13–11 (8–4)	American Bank Center (1,324); Corpus Christi, TX
02/16/2015; 7:00 pm	New Orleans	W 55–53	14–11 (9–4)	American Bank Center (1,270); Corpus Christi, TX
02/21/2015; 4:00 pm	at Incarnate Word	L 68–74	14–12 (9–5)	McDermott Center (1,200); San Antonio, TX
02/24/2015; 7:00 pm	at Abilene Christian	W 67–44	15–12 (10–5)	Moody Coliseum (1,024); Abilene, TX
02/28/2015; 7:00 pm, RTSW	Sam Houston State	W 61–59	16–12 (11–5)	American Bank Center (3,057); Corpus Christi, TX
03/05/2015; 7:30 pm	Houston Baptist	W 85–72	17–12 (12–5)	American Bank Center (1,115); Corpus Christi, TX
03/07/2015; 3:30 pm	Abilene Christian	W 58–27	18–12 (13–5)	American Bank Center (1,914); Corpus Christi, TX
Southland tournament
03/12/2015; 7:30 pm	vs. New Orleans; Quarterfinals	W 61–58	19–12	Merrell Center (1,213); Katy, TX
03/13/2015; 7:30 pm, ESPN3	vs. Sam Houston State; Semifinals	L 67–70	19–13	Merrell Center (3,268); Katy, TX
CIT
03/18/2015*; 6:00 pm, ESPN3	at Florida Gulf Coast; First round	W 75–69	20–13	Alico Arena (2,587); Fort Myers, FL
03/23/2015*; 7:00 pm	at Kent State; Second round	L 65–69	20–14	American Bank Center (2,015); Corpus Christi, TX
*Non-conference game. (#) Tournament seedings in parentheses.

== See also ==
- 2014–15 Texas A&M–Corpus Christi Islanders women's basketball team
