= 2014–15 Houston Baptist Huskies men's basketball team =

American college basketball season

2014–15 Houston Baptist Huskies men's basketball
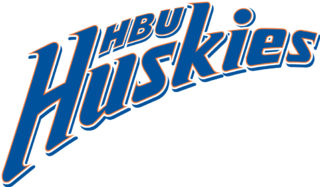
- Conference: Southland Conference
- Record: 12–16 (7–11 Southland)
- Head coach: Ron Cottrell (24th season)
- Assistant coaches: Steven Key; Justin "Jud" Kinne; Jeremy Case
- Home arena: Sharp Gymnasium (Capacity: 1,000)

2014–15 Southland Conference men's basketball standings
	Conf.				Overall
Team	W		L	PCT	W		L	PCT
Stephen F. Austin †	17	–	1	.944	29	–	5	.853
Sam Houston State	15	–	3	.833	26	–	9	.743
Texas A&M–CC	13	–	5	.722	20	–	14	.588
Northwestern State	13	–	5	.722	19	–	13	.594
Incarnate Word**	10	–	8	.556	18	–	11	.621
Lamar*	9	–	9	.500	15	–	15	.500
McNeese State	8	–	10	.444	15	–	16	.484
Houston Baptist*	7	–	11	.389	12	–	16	.429
Nicholls State	7	–	11	.389	10	–	19	.345
New Orleans	6	–	12	.333	11	–	18	.379
Southeastern Louisiana	6	–	12	.333	9	–	23	.281
Abilene Christian**	4	–	14	.222	10	–	21	.323
Central Arkansas*	2	–	16	.111	2	–	27	.069
† 2015 Southland tournament winner * ineligible for postseason due to APR penalties ** ineligible for postseason due to Div. I transition

The 2014–15 Houston Baptist Huskies men's basketball team represented Houston Baptist University in the 2014–15 NCAA Division I men's basketball season. The season was head coach Ron Cottrell's twenty-fourth season at HBU. The Huskies played their home games at the Sharp Gymnasium. They are members of the Southland Conference.

The Huskies were picked to finish thirteenth (13th) in the Southland Conference Coaches' Poll and tied for twelfth (12th) in the Sports Information Director's Poll. The team ended the season with a 12–16 overall record and a 7–11 record in conference play tied for eighth place. Due to APR penalties, they were not eligible for postseason play, including the Southland Tournament.

== Off Season ==
In May, Houston Baptist was informed that the men's basketball team would not be eligible for postseason play for failure to achieve NCAA APR standards. The team also has reduced practice from six days per week down to five per week and will be allowed only 16 hours of practice time a week instead of the normal 20 hours per week. The Houston Baptist men's basketball program was one of nine programs that did not meet the APR standards.

== Media ==
All Houston Baptist games will be broadcast online live by Legacy Sports Network (LSN). LSN will also provide online video for every non-televised Huskies home game. However HBU games can air on ESPN3 as part of the Southland Conference TV packages.

== Roster ==
2014–15 Houston Baptist Huskies men's basketball team
Players
Coaches

Pos.	#	Name	Height	Weight	Year	Previous school	Hometown
G	2	Marcel Smith	5 ft 6 in (1.68 m)	150 lb (68 kg)	Sr	Academy for Business and Technology in Melvindale	Detroit, MI
G	3	Tyler Russell	6 ft 0 in (1.83 m)	180 lb (82 kg)	Sr	Millennium	Goodyear, AZ
C	4	Cody Stetler	6 ft 9 in (2.06 m)	235 lb (107 kg)	So	Hoisington	Hoisington, KS
F	5	Colter Lasher	6 ft 7 in (2.01 m)	215 lb (98 kg)	So	Dimond; Impact Prep	Anchorage, AK
G	10	Trey Patterson	6 ft 4 in (1.93 m)	180 lb (82 kg)	Fr	Plano East	Plano, TX
G	11	Mike Turner	6 ft 0 in (1.83 m)	175 lb (79 kg)	So	St. Francis Academy; Georgia College	Alpharetta, GA
G/F	12	Terry Harris	6 ft 6 in (1.98 m)	215 lb (98 kg)	Fr	Half Hollow Hills West	Dix Hills, NY
G	13	Stephen O'Suji	5 ft 10 in (1.78 m)	190 lb (86 kg)	Fr	Kinkaid	Houston, TX
G	15	Reveal Chukwujekwu	6 ft 3 in (1.91 m)	205 lb (93 kg)	So	Strake Jesuit	Houston, TX
G/F	23	Alex Fountain	6 ft 7 in (2.01 m)	210 lb (95 kg)	So	Wartburg Central	Wartburg, TN
G/F	30	Jourdan Stickler	6 ft 4 in (1.93 m)	180 lb (82 kg)	Jr	Annapolis High School; Morehead State/Blinn	Annapolis, MD
G/F	34	Caleb Crayton	6 ft 3 in (1.91 m)	205 lb (93 kg)	Jr	Northeast Academy	Oklahoma City, OK
G	35	Anthony Odunsi	6 ft 4 in (1.93 m)	205 lb (93 kg)	Jr	Travis; Utah/Tyler JC	Sugar Land, TX
C	44	Josh Ibarra	6 ft 10 in (2.08 m)	235 lb (107 kg)	Fr	Angleton High School	Angleton, TX
C	55	Ričmonds Vilde	6 ft 11 in (2.11 m)	255 lb (116 kg)	RS Sr	Lee Academy; SMU	Riga, Latvia

Head coach

- Ron Cottrell (Arkansas)

Assistant coach(es)

- Steven Key (Houston Baptist)
- Justin 'Jud' Kinne (Albion)
- Jeremy Case (Kansas)

Legend

- (C) Team captain
- (S) Suspended
- (I) Ineligible
- (W) Walk-on
- Injured
- Current redshirt

Roster
Last update: 2014-09-19

== Schedule and results ==
Date time, TV	Opponent	Result	Record	Site (attendance) city, state
Non-Conference Schedule
11/14/2014*; 7:00 pm, BTN	at Northwestern	L 58–65	0–1	Welsh–Ryan Arena (6,372); Evanston, IL
11/17/2014*; 7:00 pm	Hillsdale Baptist	W 89–53	1–1	Sharp Gymnasium (907); Houston, TX
11/22/2014*; 7:30 pm	at Texas–Arlington	L 69–87	1–2	College Park Center (4,163); Arlington, TX
11/29/2014*; 7:00 pm	Dallas Christian	W 88–44	2–2	Sharp Gymnasium (472); Houston, TX
12/03/2014*; 7:30 pm	at Rice	W 58–55	3–2	Tudor Fieldhouse (1,139); Houston, TX
12/07/2014*; 4:00 pm, TheW.tv	at San Francisco	L 54–85	3–3	War Memorial Gymnasium (1,223); San Francisco, CA
12/13/2014*; 7:00 pm	Arlington Baptist	W 99–84	4–3	Sharp Gymnasium (616); Houston, TX
12/16/2014*; 7:00 pm, ESPN3	at Houston	L 76–83	4–4	Hofheinz Pavilion (2,016); Houston, TX
12/20/2014*; 3:00 pm	at UC Riverside	L 67–78	4–5	UC Riverside Student Recreation Center (273); Riverside, CA
12/30/2014*; 7:00 pm	Ecclesia	W 98–47	5–5	Sharp Gymnasium (270); Houston, TX
Conference Schedule
01/03/2015; 7:00 pm	Northwestern State	L 78–99	5–6 (0–1)	Sharp Gymnasium (719); Houston, TX
01/05/2015; 7:00 pm	at McNeese State	W 68–56	6–6 (1–1)	Burton Coliseum (1,104); Lake Charles, LA
01/10/2015; 7:00 pm	at Southeastern Louisiana	L 67–87	6–7 (1–2)	University Center (585); Hammond, LA
01/13/2015; 6:30 pm	at Nicholls State	L 57–61	6–8 (1–3)	Stopher Gym (849); Thibodaux, LA
01/17/2015; 7:00 pm	New Orleans	W 74–73	7–8 (2–3)	Sharp Gymnasium (907); Houston, TX
01/19/2015; 7:00 pm	Central Arkansas	W 84–61	8–8 (3–3)	Sharp Gymnasium (748); Houston, TX
01/24/2015; 7:00 pm	Lamar	W 79–77	9–8 (4–3)	Sharp Gymnasium (979); Houston, TX
01/31/2015; 4:30 pm, ESPN3	at Sam Houston State	L 52–63	9–9 (4–4)	Bernard Johnson Coliseum (1,075); Huntsville, TX
02/02/2015; 7:00 pm	Abilene Christian	W 77–61	10–9 (5–4)	Sharp Gymnasium (716); Houston, TX
02/07/2015; 6:00 pm	at Stephen F. Austin	L 59–95	10–10 (5–5)	William R. Johnson Coliseum (5,116); Nacogdoches, TX
02/09/2015; 7:00 pm	Texas A&M–Corpus Christi	W 77–66	11–10 (6–5)	Sharp Gymnasium (902); Houston, TX
02/14/2015; 7:00 pm	Sam Houston State	L 64–87	11–11 (6–6)	Sharp Gymnasium (951); Houston, TX
02/16/2015; 7:00 pm	at Lamar	L 64–72	11–12 (6–7)	Montagne Center (1,664); Beaumont, TX
02/23/2015; 7:00 pm	at Incarnate Word	L 64–77	11–13 (6–8)	McDermott Center (802); San Antonio, TX
02/28/2015; 7:00 pm	Stephen F. Austin	L 87–102	11–14 (6–9)	Sharp Gymnasium (1,046); Houston, TX
03/03/2015; 7:00 pm	at Abilene Christian	L 71–83	11–15 (6–10)	Moody Coliseum (1,158); Abilene, TX
03/05/2015; 7:30 pm	at Texas A&M–Corpus Christi	L 72–85	11–16 (6–11)	American Bank Center (1,115); Corpus Christi, TX
03/07/2015; 7:00 pm	Incarnate Word	W 78–77 ^{OT}	12–16 (7–11)	Sharp Gymnasium (1,008); Houston, TX
*Non-conference game. ^{#}Rankings from AP Poll. (#) Tournament seedings in parentheses. All times are in Central.

== See also ==
- 2014–15 Houston Baptist Huskies women's basketball team
