= 2014–15 Abilene Christian Wildcats men's basketball team =

American college basketball season

2014–15 Abilene Christian Wildcats men's basketball

Las Vegas Classic Upper Division champions
- Conference: Southland Conference
- Record: 10–21 (4–14 Southland)
- Head coach: Joe Golding (4th season)
- Assistant coaches: Brette Tanner; Patrice Days; Cooper Schmidt
- Home arena: Moody Coliseum (Capacity: 4,600)

2014–15 Southland Conference men's basketball standings
	Conf.				Overall
Team	W		L	PCT	W		L	PCT
Stephen F. Austin †	17	–	1	.944	29	–	5	.853
Sam Houston State	15	–	3	.833	26	–	9	.743
Texas A&M–CC	13	–	5	.722	20	–	14	.588
Northwestern State	13	–	5	.722	19	–	13	.594
Incarnate Word**	10	–	8	.556	18	–	11	.621
Lamar*	9	–	9	.500	15	–	15	.500
McNeese State	8	–	10	.444	15	–	16	.484
Houston Baptist*	7	–	11	.389	12	–	16	.429
Nicholls State	7	–	11	.389	10	–	19	.345
New Orleans	6	–	12	.333	11	–	18	.379
Southeastern Louisiana	6	–	12	.333	9	–	23	.281
Abilene Christian**	4	–	14	.222	10	–	21	.323
Central Arkansas*	2	–	16	.111	2	–	27	.069
† 2015 Southland tournament winner * ineligible for postseason due to APR penalties ** ineligible for postseason due to Div. I transition

The 2014–15 Abilene Christian Wildcats men's basketball team represented Abilene Christian University during the 2014–15 NCAA Division I men's basketball season. The Wildcats were led by fourth year head coach Joe Golding and played their home games at the Moody Coliseum. They are members of the Southland Conference. Abilene Christian, in their second year of DII to DI transition, was not eligible for the Southland Tournament, but was a counter for scheduling purposes and was also considered as a DI RPI member.

The Wildcats were picked to finish eleventh (11th) in the Southland Conference Coaches' Poll and tied for twelfth (12th) in the conference Sports Information Director's Poll. The Wildcats finished the season with a 10–21 overall record and finished in twelfth place in conference play with a 4–14 record.

== Roster ==
2014–15 Abilene Christian Wildcats men's basketball team
Players
Coaches

Pos.	#	Name	Height	Weight	Year	Previous school	Hometown
F	0	Riley Payne	6 ft 5 in (1.96 m)	205 lb (93 kg)	So	Idalou HS	Idalou, TX
G	1	LaDarrien Williams	6 ft 0 in (1.83 m)	180 lb (82 kg)	Sr	Coastal Bend College	Austin, TX
G	2	K. J. Maura	5 ft 7 in (1.7 m)	150 lb (68 kg)	Fr	Arlington Country Day School	San Juan, PR
G	3	Parker Wentz	5 ft 9 in (1.75 m)	170 lb (77 kg)	Jr	Trinity Christian HS	Lubbock, TX
G	4	Michael Grant	6 ft 5 in (1.96 m)	205 lb (93 kg)	So	Boyd HS	McKinney, TX
G	5	Jalen Little	5 ft 11 in (1.8 m)	170 lb (77 kg)	Jr	Otero Junior College	Colorado Springs, CO
G	10	Isaiahl Tripp	6 ft 1 in (1.85 m)	180 lb (82 kg)	Fr	Future College Prep	Baltimore, MD
G	11	Harrison Hawkins	6 ft 0 in (1.83 m)	170 lb (77 kg)	Sr	Navarro College	Long Beach, CA
F	12	Austin Cooke	6 ft 7 in (2.01 m)	225 lb (102 kg)	Jr	Central Arizona College	Scottsdale, AZ
F	14	Alexsander Milosavljevic	6 ft 10 in (2.08 m)	240 lb (109 kg)	Sr	Georgia Perimeter College	Svilajnac Serbia
G	15	Skyler Simmons	6 ft 2 in (1.88 m)	160 lb (73 kg)	Fr	Rockwall HS	Rockwall, TX
F	20	Christian Albright	6 ft 7 in (2.01 m)	240 lb (109 kg)	RS Fr	Episcopal School of Dallas	Dallas, TX
G	22	Drake Green	6 ft 3 in (1.91 m)	170 lb (77 kg)	Fr	Clear Lake HS	Houston, TX
G	30	Chris Blakeley	6 ft 0 in (1.83 m)	160 lb (73 kg)	So	J.J. Pearce HS	Richardson, TX
F	33	Duran Porter	6 ft 8 in (2.03 m)	230 lb (104 kg)	Jr	Tallahassee CC	Macon, GA
G	42	David Hanson	6 ft 0 in (1.83 m)	170 lb (77 kg)	Jr	Kankakee CC	Stockton England

Head coach

- Joe Golding

Assistant coach(es)

- Brette Tanner
- Patrice Days
- Solomon Bozeman

Legend

- (C) Team captain
- (S) Suspended
- (I) Ineligible
- (W) Walk-on
- Injured
- Current redshirt

Roster
Last update: 2014-09-30

== Schedule and results ==
Date time, TV	Opponent	Result	Record	Site (attendance) city, state
Out of Conference
11/14/2014*; 7:00 pm	Hillsdale Baptist	W 101–61	1–0	Moody Coliseum (825); Abilene, TX
11/19/2013*; 7:05 pm, ESPN3	at Tulsa	L 39–65	1–1	Reynolds Center (3,829); Tulsa, OK
11/22/2014*; 4:00 pm	Duquesne	L 81–102	1–2	Moody Coliseum (2,125); Abilene, TX
11/25/2014*; 7:00 pm	Jarvis Christian	W 91–65	2–2	Moody Coliseum (475); Abilene, TX
11/29/2014*; 6:00 pm	at UC Riverside	L 56–76	2–3	UC Riverside Student Recreation Center (183); Riverside, CA
12/04/2014*; 7:00 pm	Sacramento State	W 72–61	3–3	Moody Coliseum (2,215); Abilene, TX
12/06/2014*; 7:00 pm, ESPN3	at Houston	L 59–71	3–4	Hofheinz Pavilion (2,007); Houston, TX
12/13/2014*; 4:00 pm	Northern New Mexico	W 76–48	4–4	Moody Coliseum (1,013); Abilene, TX
12/17/2014*; 7:00 pm	at Loyola (Chicago); Las Vegas Classic	L 44–83	4–5	Joseph J. Gentile Arena (1,015); Chicago, IL
12/20/2014*; 1:00 pm	at Boise State; Las Vegas Classic	L 33–77	4–6	Taco Bell Arena (3,083); Boise, ID
12/22/2014*; 2:30 pm	vs. South Carolina State; Las Vegas Classic	W 65–59	5–6	Orleans Arena (500); Paradise, NV
12/23/2014*; 5:00 pm	vs. Arkansas–Pine Bluff; Las Vegas Classic	W 69–61	6–6	Orleans Arena (1,700); Las Vegas, NV
12/28/2014*; 5:00 pm	at Grand Canyon	L 81–83	6–7	GCU Arena (3,968); Phoenix, AZ
Conference Games
01/04/2015; 3:00 pm	Central Arkansas	W 87–70	7–7 (1–0)	Moody, Coliseum (614); Abilene, TX
01/10/2015; 4:00 pm	Nicholls State	W 71–54	8–7 (2–0)	Moody Coliseum (540); Abilene, TX
01/13/2015; 6:30 pm	at Northwestern State	W 95–81	9–7 (3–0)	Prather Coliseum (1,525); Natchitoches, LA
01/17/2015; 11:00 am, CBSSN	Stephen F. Austin	L 64–82	9–8 (3–1)	Moody Coliseum (2,874); Abilene, TX
01/20/2015; 7:00 pm	at McNeese State	L 56–63	9–9 (3–2)	Burton Coliseum (1,048); Lake Charles, LA
01/24/2015; 4:00 pm	Incarnate Word	L 61–77	9–10 (3–3)	Moody, Coliseum (1,325); Abilene, TX
01/26/2015; 7:00 pm	Sam Houston State	L 63–80	9–11 (3–4)	Moody Coliseum (1,273); Abilene, TX
01/31/2015; 6:00 pm	at Lamar	L 74–84	9–12 (3–5)	Montagne Center (2,623); Beaumont, TX
02/02/2015; 7:00 pm	at Houston Baptist	L 61–77	9–13 (3–6)	Sharp Gymnasium (716); Houston, TX
02/07/2015; 4:00 pm	Southeastern Louisiana	L 52–65	9–14 (3–7)	Moody Coliseum (1,005); Abilene, TX
02/09/2015; 7:00 pm	vs. Lamar	L 61–80	9–15 (3–8)	Curtis Culwell Center (902); Garland, TX
02/16/2015; 6:30 pm	at Sam Houston State	L 49–71	9–16 (3–9)	Bernard Johnson Coliseum (1,136); Huntsville, TX
02/21/2015; 4:00 pm, ESPN3	at Southeastern Louisiana	L 54–55	9–17 (3–10)	University Center (945); Hammond, LA
02/24/2015; 7:00 pm	Texas A&M–Corpus Christi	L 44–67	9–18 (3–11)	Moody Coliseum (1,024); Abilene, TX
02/28/2015; 6:15 pm	at New Orleans	L 55–75	9–19 (3–12)	Lakefront Arena (879); New Orleans, LA
03/03/2015; 7:00 pm	Houston Baptist	W 83–71	10–19 (4–12)	Moody Coliseum (1,158); Abilene, TX
03/05/2015; 8:00 pm	at Incarnate Word	L 52–64	10–20 (4–13)	McDermott Center (1,427); San Antonio, TX
03/07/2015; 3:30 pm	at Texas A&M-Corpus Christi	L 27–58	10–21 (4–14)	American Bank Center (1,914); Corpus Christi, TX
*Non-conference game. ^{#}Rankings from AP Poll. (#) Tournament seedings in parentheses. All times are in Central Time.

== See also ==
- 2014–15 Abilene Christian Wildcats women's basketball team
