= 2014–15 Lamar Cardinals basketball team =

American college basketball season

2014–15 Lamar Cardinals men's basketball
- Conference: Southland Conference
- Record: 15–15 (9–9 Southland)
- Head coach: Tic Price (1st season)
- Assistant coaches: Anthony Anderson (1st season); Bobby Kummer (1st season); Brian Burton (1st season)
- Home arena: Montagne Center (Capacity 10,080)

2014–15 Southland Conference men's basketball standings
	Conf.				Overall
Team	W		L	PCT	W		L	PCT
Stephen F. Austin †	17	–	1	.944	29	–	5	.853
Sam Houston State	15	–	3	.833	26	–	9	.743
Texas A&M–CC	13	–	5	.722	20	–	14	.588
Northwestern State	13	–	5	.722	19	–	13	.594
Incarnate Word**	10	–	8	.556	18	–	11	.621
Lamar*	9	–	9	.500	15	–	15	.500
McNeese State	8	–	10	.444	15	–	16	.484
Houston Baptist*	7	–	11	.389	12	–	16	.429
Nicholls State	7	–	11	.389	10	–	19	.345
New Orleans	6	–	12	.333	11	–	18	.379
Southeastern Louisiana	6	–	12	.333	9	–	23	.281
Abilene Christian**	4	–	14	.222	10	–	21	.323
Central Arkansas*	2	–	16	.111	2	–	27	.069
† 2015 Southland tournament winner * ineligible for postseason due to APR penalties ** ineligible for postseason due to Div. I transition

The 2014–15 Lamar Cardinals basketball team represented Lamar University during the 2014–15 NCAA Division I men's basketball season. The Cardinals, led by first year head coach Tic Price, played their home games at the Montagne Center and were members of the Southland Conference.

After former head coach, Pat Knight, was fired on February 16, 2014, the Cardinals finished the season with a record of 1–4 under interim head coach, Tic Price. Price was named head coach on March 18, 2014. The 2014–2015 was coach Price's first season as the Cardinals' head coach.

The Cardinals were picked to finish tenth (10th) in the conference in both the Coaches' Poll and the Sports Information Director polls.

The Cardinals finished the season 15–15, 9–9 in Southland play to finish in sixth place. Due to APR penalties, they were not eligible for postseason play, including the Southland tournament. Compared to total wins (all Division I) for the previous two seasons of three and four respectively, the fifteen wins (eleven wins over NCAA Division I competition) represented a marked improvement.

Two Cardinals were recognized by the Southland Conference at the conclusion of the regular season. Tyran de Lattibeaudiere received several Southland Conference honors. He was named Southland Conference Newcomer of the Year. In addition, he was named to both the conference All-Defense team and the All-Southland Conference, 2nd team. Anthony Holiday was named to the All-Southland Conference, 3rd team.

== Media ==
All Lamar Cardinals home games except those otherwise contracted for will be broadcast online live by Big Red Sports Network (BRSN).

== Off season ==
On April 16, Tic Price named his coaching staff. Anthony Anderson, Robert Kummer, and Antonio Madlock were named assistant coaches. On May 16, Coach Madlock resigned to take a similar position at Mississippi. Price completed his staff on June 27 naming Matt Pace as Director of Basketball Operations. Brian Burton was named assistant coach filling the vacancy left by Antonio Madlock's departure in May.

In May, Lamar was informed that the men's basketball team would not be eligible for postseason play for failure to achieve NCAA APR standards. The team also has reduced practice from six days per week down to five per week and will be allowed only 16 hours of practice time a week instead of the normal 20 hours per week. The Lamar men's basketball program was one of nine programs that did not meet the APR standards.

=== Departures ===
Name	Number	Pos.	Height	Weight	Year	Hometown	Notes
Departures
Keilan Blanks	1	Guard	5'9"	160	Sophomore	Spring Hill, TN	Left team.
Rhon Mitchell	10	Forward	6'5"	180	Sophomore	Inglewood, CA	Left team.
Nimrod Hilliard	11	Guard	6'0"	154	Junior	Madison, WI	Left team.
Octavius Green	24	Forward	6'6"	194	Junior	Gainesville, FL	Left team.
Amos Wilson	34	Forward	6'5"	195	Senior	Allen, TX	Graduated.

=== Class of 2014 signees ===
Name	Pos.	Height	Weight	Year	Hometown	High School/Junior College
2014 Signees
Zjori Bosha	Guard	6'5"	185	Freshman	Sour Lake, TX	Hardin-Jefferson HS
Zachary Hollis	Forward/Center	6'9"	220	Sophomore	Palmdale, CA	Knight HS/Antelope Valley College
Quan Jones	Guard	6'3"	170	Junior	Little Rock, AR	Hall HS/Connors State College
Dontavious Sears	Forward	6'5"	185	Junior	Memphis, TN	Manassas HS/Eastern Oklahoma State College
LeMon Gregory	Center	6'10"	255	Junior	Greenville, KY	Muhlenberg County HS/Angelina College

== Roster ==
ֶ

2014–15 Lamar Cardinals men's basketball team
Players
Coaches

Pos.	#	Name	Height	Weight	Year	Previous school	Hometown
G	1	Anthony Holliday	6 ft 1 in (1.85 m)	170 lb (77 kg)	Sr	Norwalk HS/Cerritos College	Los Angeles, CA
PG	2	Kevin Booze	5 ft 11 in (1.8 m)	185 lb (84 kg)	Fr	MacArthur HS	Irving, TX
G	3	Benquan Petty	5 ft 9 in (1.75 m)	175 lb (79 kg)	Jr	DeSoto HS/Cedar Valley College	DeSoto, TX
G	4	Matt Hancock	6 ft 4 in (1.93 m)	205 lb (93 kg)	Jr	Scotch College	Melbourne, Australia
F	5	Tryan de Lattibeaudiere	6 ft 6 in (1.98 m)	203 lb (92 kg)	Sr	Tivoli Gardens HS/Vincennese (Ind.)	Kingston, Jamaica
G	10	Donnell Minton	6 ft 0 in (1.83 m)	148 lb (67 kg)	Jr	Northwest HS	Indianapolis, IN
G	12	Zjori Bosha	6 ft 5 in (1.96 m)	185 lb (84 kg)	Fr	Hardin-Jefferson HS	Sour Lake, TX
F/C	15	Zachary Hollis	6 ft 9 in (2.06 m)	220 lb (100 kg)	Jr	Knight HS/Antelope Valley College	Palmdale, CA
G/F	20	Marcus Owens	6 ft 3 in (1.91 m)	195 lb (88 kg)	So	Deerfield Beach HS	Fort Lauderdale, FL
F	21	Donovan Ross	6 ft 5 in (1.96 m)	207 lb (94 kg)	Sr	Ridgeland HS/SW Mississippi CC	Ridgeland, MS
G	22	Preston Mattingly	6 ft 2 in (1.88 m)	195 lb (88 kg)	So	Evansville Central HS	Evansville, IN
F	23	Dontavious Sears	6 ft 5 in (1.96 m)	185 lb (84 kg)	Jr	Manassas HS/Eastern Oklahoma State College	Memphis, TN
G	24	Quan Jones	6 ft 3 in (1.91 m)	170 lb (77 kg)	Jr	Hall HS/Connors State College	Little Rock, AR
C	42	LeMon Gregory	6 ft 10 in (2.08 m)	255 lb (116 kg)	Jr	Muhlenberg County HS/Angelina College	Greenville, KY
F	50	Sebastian Norman	6 ft 10 in (2.08 m)	230 lb (104 kg)	Sr	Celsius School	Uppsala, Sweden

Head coach

- Tic Price

Assistant coach(es)

- Anthony Anderson
- Bobby Kummer
- Brian Burton

Legend

- (C) Team captain
- (S) Suspended
- (I) Ineligible
- (W) Walk-on
- Injured
- Current redshirt

Roster
Last update: 09/12/2014

== Schedule and results ==
Season Results:

Date time, TV	Opponent	Result	Record	High points	High rebounds	High assists	Site (attendance) city, state
Out of Conference
11/14/2014*; 8:30 pm, ESPN3	at No. 22 SMU; Hoosier Classic	L 54–93	0–1	12 – Holliday	9 – de Lattibeaudiere	2 – Three players	Moody Coliseum (6,971); University Park, TX
11/16/2014*; 2:00 pm, BRSN	LSU–Alexandria; Hoosier Classic	W 78–75	1–1	26 – de Lattibeaudiere	10 – de Lattibeaudiere	5 – Petty	Montagne Center (3,313); Beaumont, TX
11/19/2014*; 7:00 pm	at Texas State	L 55–65	1–2	14 – de Lattibeaudiere	5 – de Lattibeaudiere	3 – de Lattibeaudiere	Strahan Coliseum (1,634); San Marcos, TX
11/22/2014*; 7:00 pm, BTN	at Indiana; Hoosier Classic	L 72–85	1–3	18 – de Lattibeaudiere	8 – de Lattibeaudiere	5 – Holliday	Assembly Hall (12,203); Bloomington, IN
11/25/2014*; 7:05 pm	at Arkansas State	W 63–58	2–3	12 – de Lattibeaudiere	7 – de Lattibeaudiere	5 – de Lattibeaudiere	Convocation Center (1,534); Jonesboro, AR
11/28/2014*; 3:00 pm	at Texas Southern; Hoosier Classic	L 59–71	2–4	16 – de Lattibeaudiere	5 – de Lattibeaudiere	4 – Jones	Health and Physical Education Arena (N/A); Houston, TX
12/02/2014*; 7:00 pm, Cyclones.tv	at No. 20 Iowa State	L 59–96	2–5	13 – Gregory	8 – Ross	4 – Jones	Hilton Coliseum (13,907); Ames, IA
12/13/2014*; 7:00 pm	at Texas–Pan American	L 60–66	2–6	17 – Ross	10 – Ross	5 – Jones	UTPA Fieldhouse (921); Edinburg, TX
12/15/2014*; 7:00 pm, BRSN	Champion Baptist	W 128–54	3–6	30 – de Lattibeaudiere	7 – de Lattibeaudiere	11 – Holliday	Montagne Center (1,673); Beaumont, TX
12/19/2014*; 7:00 pm, BRSN	Milligan	W 80–53	4–6	21 – Ross	14 – de Lattibeaudiere	3 – Ross, Holliday	Montagne Center (1,843); Beaumont, TX
12/22/2014*; 7:00 pm, BRSN	Rice	W 79–72 ^{OT}	5–6	17 – Booze	12 – de Lattibeaudiere	5 – Holliday	Montagne Center (1,740); Beaumont, TX
12/30/2014*; 7:00 pm, BRSN	Huston–Tillotson	W 85–59	6–6	24 – de Lattibeaudiere	13 – Owens	4 – Booze	Montagne Center (1,621); Beaumont, TX
Conference Games
01/03/2015; 6:00 pm, BRSN	Nicholls State	W 75–62	7–6 (1–0)	23 – Holliday	10 – Owens	5 – Booze	Montagne Center (1,877); Beaumont, TX
01/05/2015; 7:00 pm	at New Orleans	L 67–72	7–7 (1–1)	17 – de Lattibeaudiere	7 – de Lattibeaudiere, Owens	2 – Holliday, Booze	Lakefront Arena (581); New Orleans, LA
01/10/2015; 6:00 pm, BRSN	Central Arkansas	W 84–65	8–7 (2–1)	19 – Bosha	5 – de Lattibeaudiere, Gregory	5 – Holliday	Montagne Center (1,908); Beaumont, TX
01/12/2015; 7:00 pm	at Texas A&M–Corpus Christi	W 66–64	9–7 (3–1)	25 – Holliday	8 – Gregory	8 – Holliday	American Bank Center (824); Corpus Christi, TX
01/17/2015; 3:00 pm	at Northwestern State	L 84–96	9–8 (3–2)	25 – Holliday	11 – Gregory	5 – Booze	Prather Coliseum (1,823); Natchitoches, LA
01/19/2015; 7:00 pm, BRSN	Southeastern Louisiana	W 57–50	10–8 (4–2)	14 – de Lattibeaudiere	10 – de Lattibeaudiere	5 – Holliday	Montagne Center (1,776); Beaumont, TX
01/24/2015; 7:30 pm	at Houston Baptist	L 77–79	10–9 (4–3)	30 – Holliday	6 – Gregory, de Lattibeaudiere	4 – Booze	Sharp Gymnasium (979); Houston, TX
01/26/2015; 7:00 pm, BRSN	Stephen F. Austin	L 65–82	10–10 (4–4)	25 – Holliday	6 – Gregory	3 – Booze	Montagne Center (2,412); Beaumont, TX
01/31/2015; 6:00 pm, BRSN	Abilene Christian	W 84–74	11–10 (5–4)	29 – Holliday	10 – Ross	8 – Booze	Montagne Center (2,623); Beaumont, TX
02/02/2015; 6:30 pm, RTSW	at Sam Houston State	L 50–79	11–11 (5–5)	14 – Holliday	8 – Owens	4 – Holliday	Bernard Johnson Coliseum (1,081); Huntsville, TX
02/07/2015; 4:00 pm, ESPN3	at Incarnate Word	L 72–78	11–12 (5–6)	15 – Holliday; de Lattibeaudiere	9 – de Lattibeaudiere	5 – Booze	McDermott Convocation Center (1,710); San Antonio, TX
02/09/2015; 7:00 pm	vs. Abilene Christian	W 80–61	12–12 (6–6)	35 – Booze	6 – Jones; de Lattibeaudiere	4 – Holliday; Booze	Curtis Culwell Center (902); Garland, TX
02/16/2015; 7:00 pm, BRSN	Houston Baptist	W 72–64	13–12 (7–6)	20 – Owens	14 – de Lattibeaudiere	4 – Holliday	Montagne Center (1,664); Beaumont, TX
02/21/2015; 6:00 pm, BRSN	McNeese State	W 58–53	14–12 (8–6)	18 – Owens	10 – de Lattibeaudiere	5 – Booze	Montagne Center (3,543); Beaumont, TX
02/23/2015; 7:00 pm	at Stephen F. Austin	L 74–103	14–13 (8–7)	22 – de Lattibeaudiere	10 – de Lattibeaudiere	3 – Booze	William R. Johnson Coliseum (2,744); Nacogdoches, TX
02/28/2015; 6:00 pm, BRSN	Incarnate Word	W 79–66	15–13 (9–7)	22 – Ross	9 – de Lattibeaudiere; Ross	6 – Holliday	Montagne Center (2,005); Beaumont, TX
03/02/2015; 7:00 pm, RTSW	at McNeese State	L 69–70	15–14 (9–8)	26 – Holliday	11 – de Lattibeaudiere	5 – de Lattibeaudiere	Burton Coliseum (1,201); Lake Charles, LA
03/05/2015; 7:30 pm, BRSN	Sam Houston State	L 61–67	15–15 (9–9)	20 – Holliday	7 – de Lattibeaudiere	6 – Booze	Montagne Center (2,418); Beaumont, TX
*Non-conference game. ^{#}Rankings from AP Poll. (#) Tournament seedings in parentheses. All times are in Central Time.

== See also ==
- 2014–15 Lamar Lady Cardinals basketball team
