= 2014–15 Central Arkansas Bears basketball team =

American college basketball season

2014–15 Central Arkansas Bears basketball
- Conference: Southland Conference
- Record: 2–27 (2–16 Southland)
- Head coach: Russ Pennell (1st season)
- Assistant coaches: Anthony Boone (1st season); Joey Moon; Matt Scherbenske; Sammy Munsey
- Home arena: Farris Center (Capacity: 6,000)

2014–15 Southland Conference men's basketball standings
	Conf.				Overall
Team	W		L	PCT	W		L	PCT
Stephen F. Austin †	17	–	1	.944	29	–	5	.853
Sam Houston State	15	–	3	.833	26	–	9	.743
Texas A&M–CC	13	–	5	.722	20	–	14	.588
Northwestern State	13	–	5	.722	19	–	13	.594
Incarnate Word**	10	–	8	.556	18	–	11	.621
Lamar*	9	–	9	.500	15	–	15	.500
McNeese State	8	–	10	.444	15	–	16	.484
Houston Baptist*	7	–	11	.389	12	–	16	.429
Nicholls State	7	–	11	.389	10	–	19	.345
New Orleans	6	–	12	.333	11	–	18	.379
Southeastern Louisiana	6	–	12	.333	9	–	23	.281
Abilene Christian**	4	–	14	.222	10	–	21	.323
Central Arkansas*	2	–	16	.111	2	–	27	.069
† 2015 Southland tournament winner * ineligible for postseason due to APR penalties ** ineligible for postseason due to Div. I transition

The 2014–15 Central Arkansas Bears basketball team represented the University of Central Arkansas during the 2014–15 NCAA Division I men's basketball season. The Bears were led by head coach Russ Pennell and played their home games at the Farris Center. They were members of the Southland Conference.

The Bears were picked to finish 12th in the Southland Conference Coaches' Poll and 11th in the Sports Information Director's Poll. They finished the season 2–27, 2–16 in conference, to finish in 13th and last place. Due to APR penalties, they were not eligible for postseason play, including the Southland Tournament.

The team played the season with a roster made up of mostly freshmen, and point guard Jordan Howard was named the Southland Conference Freshman of the Year.

== Off Season ==
On March 5, it was announced that UCA alumni Russ Pennell would be the team's new head coach for the following season.

In May, Central Arkansas was informed that the men's basketball team would not be eligible for postseason play for failure to achieve NCAA APR standards. The team also has reduced practice from six days per week down to five per week and will be allowed only 16 hours of practice time a week instead of the normal 20 hours per week. The Central Arkansas men's basketball program was one of nine programs that did not meet the APR standards.

== Roster ==
Source: Access Date: 9/19/2015

Number	Name	Position	Height	Weight	Year	Hometown
0	Ethan Lee	Forward	6–7	190	Sophomore	Camden, AR
00	Michael Milligan Jr.	Strong Forward	6–6	195	Freshman	Los Angeles, CA
1	Jordan Howard	Point Guard	5-11	180	Freshman	Chandler, AZ
3	Tyler Simmons	Guard	6-1	175	Freshman	Greenbrier, AR
4	Albert Christensson	Forward/center	6-9	220	Freshman	Lund, Sweden
5	Justin Foreman	Strong Forward	6–6	210	Junior	Bellaire, TX
10	Mathieu Kamba	Guard	6–5	205	Freshman	Calgary, Alberta, Canada
11	Jeff Lowery	Point Guard	6–2	200	Junior	Phoenix, AZ
13	Otas Iyekekpolor	Forward	6–8	220	Freshman	Edmonton, Alberta, Canada
21	Joel Fiegler	Forward	6-10	220	Junior	Las Vegas, NV
23	Hunter Ball	Forward	6–7	240	Freshman	Waldron, AR
25	Thatch Unruh	Strong Guard	6-5	190	Freshman	Branson, MO
30	Michael Martin	Guard	6-0	190	Junior	Wichita, KS
52	Jake Zuilhof	Center	6–9	230	Junior	Azle, TX

== Schedule and results ==
Date time, TV	Opponent	Result	Record	Site (attendance) city, state
Exhibition
11/01/2014*; 4:00 pm	Hendrix College	W 102–60		Farris Center (824); Conway, AR
11/08/2014*; 4:00 pm	University of the Ozarks	W 91–71		Farris Center (753); Conway, AR
Non-conference regular season
11/14/2014*; 8:00 pm, FSN	at Creighton	L 77–104	0–1	CenturyLink Center Omaha (18,160); Omaha, NE
11/16/2014*; 4:00 pm	at Omaha	L 75–100	0–2	Ralston Arena (1,367); Omaha, NE
11/18/2014*; 7:00 pm, ESPN3	at No. 21 Nebraska	L 56–82	0–3	Pinnacle Bank Arena (15,389); Lincoln, NE
11/22/2014*; 3:00 pm	Southeast Missouri State	L 68–74	0–4	Farris Center (748); Conway, AR
11/25/2014*; 6:30 pm	at Charleston Southern	L 67–80	0–5	CSU Field House (777); North Charleston, SC
11/29/2014*; 3:00 pm	at Arkansas-Little Rock	L 71–85	0–6	Jack Stephens Center (1,060); Little Rock, AR
12/01/2014*; 7:00 pm	Arkansas State	L 49–67	0–7	Farris Center (1,734); Conway, AR
12/06/2014*; 12:00 pm	at Troy	L 73–85	0–8	Trojan Arena (1,089); Troy, AL
12/17/2014*; 9:00 pm, ROOT	at New Mexico	L 55–76	0–9	The Pit (13,117); Albuquerque, NM
12/21/2014*; 12:30 pm	Coastal Carolina	L 55–72	0–10	Farris Center (335); Conway, AR
12/29/2014*; 7:00 pm	Morehead State	L 60–95	0–11	Farris Center (310); Conway, AR
Conference Games
01/04/2015; 3:00 pm	at Abilene Christian	L 70–87	0–12 (0–1)	Moody Coliseum (614); Abilene, TX
01/06/2015; 8:00 pm	Texas A&M-Corpus Christi	L 70–77	0–13 (0–2)	Farris Center (752); Conway, AR
01/10/2015; 6:00 pm	at Lamar	L 65–84	0–14 (0–3)	Montagne Center (1,908); Beaumont, TX
01/13/2015; 7:00 pm	Stephen F. Austin	L 58–109	0–15 (0–4)	Farris Center (875); Conway, AR
01/19/2015; 7:00 pm	at Houston Baptist	L 64–81	0–16 (0–5)	Sharp Gymnasium (748); Houston, TX
01/24/2015*; 4:00 pm	Nicholls State	L 61–71	0–17 (0–6)	Farris Center (1,178); Conway, AR
01/26/2015; 7:00 pm	at New Orleans	L 67–87	0–18 (0–7)	Lakefront Arena (340); New Orleans, LA
02/03/2015; 7:00 pm	Northwestern State	L 108–110	0–19 (0–8)	Farris Center (2,120); Conway, AR
02/07/2015; 4:00 pm, ESPN3	New Orleans	W 70–67	1–19 (1–8)	Farris Center (985); Conway, AR
02/10/2015; 7:00 pm	at Southeastern Louisiana	L 58–83	1–20 (1–9)	University Center (573); Hammond, LA
02/13/2015; 7:00 pm	Incarnate Word	L 67–77	1–21 (1–10)	Farris Center (688); Conway, AR
02/16/2015; 6:30 pm	at Northwestern State	L 70–86	1–22 (1–11)	Prather Coliseum (1,231); Natchitoches, LA
02/21/2015; 4:00 pm	Sam Houston State	L 42–70	1–23 (1–12)	Farris Center (1,325); Conway, AR
02/24/2015; 7:00 pm	McNeese State	L 60–77	1–24 (1–13)	Farris Center (895); Conway, AR
02/28/2015; 4:00 pm	Southeastern Louisiana	W 74–72	2–24 (2–13)	Farris Center (1,112); Conway, AR
03/02/2015; 6:30 pm	at Sam Houston State	L 49–76	2–25 (2–14)	Bernard Johnson Coliseum (1,353); Huntsville, TX
03/05/2015; 7:30 pm	at Nicholls State	L 70–77	2–26 (2–15)	Stopher Gym (815); Thibodaux, LA
03/08/2015; 1:00 pm	at McNeese State	L 68–70	2–27 (2–16)	Burton Coliseum (1,065); Lake Charles, LA
*Non-conference game. ^{#}Rankings from AP Poll. (#) Tournament seedings in parentheses. All times are in Central Time.

== See also ==
- 2014–15 Central Arkansas Sugar Bears basketball team
