= 2014–15 Nebraska Cornhuskers men's basketball team =

American college basketball season

2014–15 Nebraska Cornhuskers men's basketball
- Conference: Big Ten Conference
- Record: 13–18 (5–13 Big Ten)
- Head coach: Tim Miles (3rd season)
- Assistant coaches: Chris Harriman; Kenya Hunter; Jim Molinari
- Home arena: Pinnacle Bank Arena

2014–15 Big Ten Conference men's basketball standings
| | Conf. | | | | Overall |
| Team | W | | L | PCT | W | | L | PCT |
|---|---|---|---|---|---|---|---|---|
| No. 3 Wisconsin † | 16 | – | 2 | .889 | 36 | – | 4 | .900 |
| No. 12 Maryland | 14 | – | 4 | .778 | 28 | – | 7 | .800 |
| No. 23 Michigan State | 12 | – | 6 | .667 | 27 | – | 12 | .692 |
| Iowa | 12 | – | 6 | .667 | 22 | – | 12 | .647 |
| Purdue | 12 | – | 6 | .667 | 21 | – | 13 | .618 |
| Ohio State | 11 | – | 7 | .611 | 24 | – | 11 | .686 |
| Indiana | 9 | – | 9 | .500 | 20 | – | 14 | .588 |
| Illinois | 9 | – | 9 | .500 | 19 | – | 14 | .576 |
| Michigan | 8 | – | 10 | .444 | 16 | – | 16 | .500 |
| Minnesota | 6 | – | 12 | .333 | 18 | – | 15 | .545 |
| Northwestern | 6 | – | 12 | .333 | 15 | – | 17 | .469 |
| Nebraska | 5 | – | 13 | .278 | 13 | – | 18 | .419 |
| Penn State | 4 | – | 14 | .222 | 18 | – | 16 | .529 |
| Rutgers | 2 | – | 16 | .111 | 10 | – | 22 | .313 |
† 2015 Big Ten tournament winner Rankings from AP poll

The 2014–15 Nebraska Cornhuskers men's basketball team represented the University of Nebraska–Lincoln in the 2014–15 NCAA Division I men's basketball season. Led by head coach Tim Miles, in his third season, the Cornhuskers team played its home games at Pinnacle Bank Arena in downtown Lincoln, Nebraska, and played its fourth season as a member of the Big Ten Conference. They finished the season 13–18, 5–13 in Big Ten play to finish in twelfth place. They lost in the first round of the Big Ten tournament to Penn State.

== Previous season ==
The Cornhuskers finished the season with an overall record of 19–13, with a record of 11–7 in the Big Ten regular season. In the 2014 Big Ten tournament, the Cornhuskers were defeated by Ohio State, 71–67 in the quarterfinals. They received at-large bid to the 2014 NCAA Division I men's basketball tournament for the first time since 1998. They lost in the second round to Baylor.

== Off-season ==
=== Departures ===
| Name | Number | Pos. | Height | Weight | Year | Hometown | Notes |
|---|---|---|---|---|---|---|---|
| Deverell Biggs | 1 | G | 6'7" | 170 | Sophomore | Omaha, NE | Dismissed, transferred to Texas Southern |
| Nathan Hawkins | 4 | G | 6'5" | 186 | Sophomore | Garland, TX | Transferred to UT Arlington |
| Jordan Tyrance | 11 | F | 6'3" | 195 | RS Junior | Lincoln, NE | Left the team for personal reasons |
| Mike Peltz | 12 | G | 6'2" | 199 | Senior | Alliance, NE | Graduated |
| Sergej Vucetic | 14 | C | 7'1" | 236 | Sophomore | Vrbas, Serbia | Transferred to Evansville |
| Ray Gallegos | 15 | G | 6'2" | 181 | RS Senior | Salt Lake City, UT | Graduated |
| Tim Wagner | 33 | G | 6'3" | 188 | Freshman | Galesville, WI | Transferred to Winona State |

=== Incoming transfers ===
| Name | Number | Pos. | Height | Weight | Year | Hometown | Previous School |
|---|---|---|---|---|---|---|---|
| Andrew White III | 1 | G | 6'6" | 210 | Junior | Chester, VA | Transferred from Kansas. Under NCAA transfer rules, White III will have to redshirt for the 2014–15 season. Will have two years of remaining eligibility. |
| Moses Ayegba | 12 | C | 6'9" | 247 | Senior | Kano, Nigeria | Transferred from Georgetown. Will be eligible to play immediately since Ayegba graduated from Georgetown University. |

== Incoming recruits ==
College recruiting information
| Name | Hometown | School | Height | Weight | Commit date |
|---|---|---|---|---|---|
| Jacob Hammond; C | Duncan, OK | Comanche | 6 ft 8 in (2.03 m) | 225 lb (102 kg) | Aug 11, 2013 |
| Jacob Hammond; C | Recruit ratings: Scout: Rivals: 247Sports: ESPN: | | | | |
| Tarin Smith; PG | Asbury Park, NJ | St. Anthony | 6 ft 2 in (1.88 m) | 195 lb (88 kg) | Mar 16, 2014 |
| Tarin Smith; PG | Recruit ratings: Scout: Rivals: 247Sports: ESPN: | | | | |
Overall recruit ranking:
Note: In many cases, Scout, Rivals, 247Sports, On3, and ESPN may conflict in their listings of height and weight.; In these cases, the average was taken. ESPN grades are on a 100-point scale.; Sources: "2014 Team Ranking". Rivals.

== Roster ==
2014–15 Nebraska Cornhuskers men's basketball team
Players
Coaches

| Pos. | # | Name | Height | Weight | Year | Hometown |
|---|---|---|---|---|---|---|
| G | 0 | Tai Webster | 6 ft 3 in (1.91 m) | 199 lb (90 kg) | So | Auckland, NZ |
| G | 1 | Andrew White (redshirt) | 6 ft 7 in (2.01 m) | 220 lb (100 kg) | Jr | Richmond, VA |
| G | 2 | David Rivers | 6 ft 7 in (2.01 m) | 200 lb (91 kg) | Sr | Little Rock, AR |
| G | 3 | Benny Parker | 5 ft 9 in (1.75 m) | 172 lb (78 kg) | Jr | Kansas City, KS |
| F | 5 | Terran Petteway | 6 ft 6 in (1.98 m) | 215 lb (98 kg) | RS Jr | Galveston, TX |
| G | 10 | Trevor Menke | 5 ft 11 in (1.8 m) | 184 lb (83 kg) | RS Sr | Beatrice, NE |
| G | 11 | Tarin Smith | 6 ft 2 in (1.88 m) | 175 lb (79 kg) | Fr | Asbury Park, NJ |
| C | 12 | Moses Ayegba | 6 ft 9 in (2.06 m) | 252 lb (114 kg) | Sr | Kano, Nigeria |
| F | 21 | Leslee Smith | 6 ft 8 in (2.03 m) | 254 lb (115 kg) | Sr | Long Look, BVI |
| G | 23 | Nick Fuller | 6 ft 6 in (1.98 m) | 207 lb (94 kg) | RS Fr | Sun Prairie, WI |
| C | 24 | Jacob Hammond | 6 ft 10 in (2.08 m) | 230 lb (104 kg) | Fr | Duncan, OK |
| F | 30 | B. J. Day (W) | 6 ft 5 in (1.96 m) | 236 lb (107 kg) | Fr | Lincoln, NE |
| G | 31 | Shavon Shields | 6 ft 6 in (1.98 m) | 221 lb (100 kg) | Jr | Olathe, KS |
| F | 35 | Walter Pitchford | 6 ft 10 in (2.08 m) | 237 lb (108 kg) | RS Jr | Grand Rapids, MI |
| C | 44 | Kye Kurkowski | 6 ft 10 in (2.08 m) | 221 lb (100 kg) | RS Sr | Grant, NE |

Head coach

- Tim Miles (Mary)

Assistant coach(es)

- Chris Harriman (Augusta State)
- Kenya Hunter (Duquesne)
- Jim Molinari (Illinois Wesleyan)

Legend

- (C) Team captain
- (S) Suspended
- (I) Ineligible
- (W) Walk-on
- Injured
- Current redshirt

Roster

== Schedule ==
| Date time, TV | Rank^{#} | Opponent^{#} | Result | Record | Site (attendance) city, state |
Exhibition
| Nov 6*; 6:30 pm | No. 21 | Southwest Minnesota State | W 83–61 | - | Pinnacle Bank Arena (10,314); Lincoln, NE |
Regular season
| Nov 16*; 1:00 pm | No. 21 | Northern Kentucky | W 80–61 | 1–0 | Pinnacle Bank Arena (15,479); Lincoln, NE |
| Nov 18*; 7:00 pm, ESPN3 | No. 21 | Central Arkansas | W 82–56 | 2–0 | Pinnacle Bank Arena (15,389); Lincoln, NE |
| Nov 22*; 6:00 pm | No. 21 | at Rhode Island | L 62–66 ^{OT} | 2–1 | Ryan Center (7,657); Kingston, RI |
| Nov 25*; 7:00 pm, ESPN3 | | Omaha | W 80–67 | 3–1 | Pinnacle Bank Arena (15,889); Lincoln, NE |
| Nov 28*; 7:00 pm, ESPN3 | | Tennessee–Martin | W 75–64 | 4–1 | Pinnacle Bank Arena (15,987); Lincoln, NE |
| Dec 1*; 6:00 pm, ESPN2 | | at Florida State; ACC–Big Ten Challenge | W 70–65 | 5–1 | Donald L. Tucker Civic Center (6,406); Tallahassee, FL |
| Dec 7*; 6:00 pm, BTN | | Creighton; Rivalry | L 55–65 | 5–2 | Pinnacle Bank Arena (15,782); Lincoln, NE |
| Dec 10*; 7:00 pm, ESPN3 | | Incarnate Word | L 73–74 | 5–3 | Pinnacle Bank Arena (15,275); Lincoln, NE |
| Dec 13*; 8:00 pm, BTN | | Cincinnati | W 56–55 ^{2OT} | 6–3 | Pinnacle Bank Arena (15,607); Lincoln, NE |
| Dec 22*; 12:00 am, ESPNU | | at Hawaiʻi; Diamond Head Classic quarterfinals | L 58–66 | 6–4 | Stan Sheriff Center (8,448); Honolulu, HI |
| Dec 23*; 10:30 pm, ESPNU | | vs. Loyola Marymount; Diamond Head Classic consolation round | W 50–42 ^{OT} | 7–4 | Stan Sheriff Center (7,140); Honolulu, HI |
| Dec 25*; 3:00 pm, ESPNU | | vs. Ohio; Diamond Head Classic fifth place game | W 71–58 | 8–4 | Stan Sheriff Center (5,125); Honolulu, HI |
Big Ten regular season
| Dec 31; 4:30 pm, BTN | | Indiana | L 65–70 | 8–5 (0–1) | Pinnacle Bank Arena (14,987); Lincoln, NE |
| Jan 5; 8:00 pm, BTN | | at Iowa | L 59–70 | 8–6 (0–2) | Carver–Hawkeye Arena (12,789); Iowa City, IA |
| Jan 8; 8:00 pm, ESPNU | | Rutgers | W 65–49 | 9–6 (1–2) | Pinnacle Bank Arena (14,857); Lincoln, NE |
| Jan 11; 7:30 pm, BTN | | Illinois | W 53–43 | 10–6 (2–2) | Pinnacle Bank Arena (15,514); Lincoln, NE |
| Jan 15; 8:00 pm, ESPN2 | | at No. 7 Wisconsin | L 55–70 | 10–7 (2–3) | Kohl Center (17,279); Madison, WI |
| Jan 20; 7:30 pm, BTN | | Minnesota | W 52–49 | 11–7 (3–3) | Pinnacle Bank Arena (15,606); Lincoln, NE |
| Jan 24; 3:00 pm, ESPN | | Michigan State | W 79–77 | 12–7 (4–3) | Pinnacle Bank Arena (15,757); Lincoln, NE |
| Jan 27; 6:00 pm, ESPN | | at Michigan | L 44–58 | 12–8 (4–4) | Crisler Center (12,115); Ann Arbor, MI |
| Jan 31; 5:00 pm, BTN | | at Minnesota | L 42–60 | 12–9 (4–5) | Williams Arena (13,253); Minneapolis, MN |
| Feb 3; 6:30 pm, BTN | | Northwestern | W 76–60 | 13–9 (5–5) | Pinnacle Bank Arena (15,482); Lincoln, NE |
| Feb 7; 3:00 pm, ESPNU | | at Penn State | L 58–64 | 13–10 (5–6) | Bryce Jordan Center (11,702); University Park, PA |
| Feb 10; 8:00 pm, ESPN | | No. 5 Wisconsin | L 55–65 | 13–11 (5–7) | Pinnacle Bank Arena (15,701); Lincoln, NE |
| Feb 15; 4:15 pm, BTN | | at Purdue | L 54–66 | 13–12 (5–8) | Mackey Arena (14,313); West Lafayette, IN |
| Feb 19; 6:00 pm, BTN | | at No. 16 Maryland | L 65–69 | 13–13 (5–9) | Xfinity Center (14,376); College Park, MD |
| Feb 22; 2:00 pm, BTN | | Iowa | L 46–74 | 13–14 (5–10) | Pinnacle Bank Arena (15,933); Lincoln, NE |
| Feb 26; 6:00 pm, ESPN | | at Ohio State | L 57–81 | 13–15 (5–11) | Value City Arena (13,712); Columbus, OH |
| Mar 4; 9:00 pm, BTN | | at Illinois | L 57–69 | 13–16 (5–12) | State Farm Center (17,085); Champaign, IL |
| Mar 8; 6:30 pm, BTN | | No. 10 Maryland | L 61–64 | 13–17 (5–13) | Pinnacle Bank Arena (15,856); Lincoln, NE |
Big Ten tournament
| Mar 11; 3:30 pm, ESPN2 | | vs. Penn State; First round | L 65–68 | 13–18 | United Center; Chicago, IL |
*Non-conference game. ^{#}Rankings from AP Poll. (#) Tournament seedings in parentheses. All times are in Central Time.

== Rankings ==
Ranking movement Legend: ██ Increase in ranking. ██ Decrease in ranking.
| Poll | Pre | Wk 2 | Wk 3 | Wk 4 | Wk 5 | Wk 6 | Wk 7 | Wk 8 | Wk 9 | Wk 10 | Wk 11 | Wk 12 | Wk 13 | Wk 14 | Wk 15 | Wk 16 | Wk 17 | Wk 18 | Wk 19 | Final |
|---|---|---|---|---|---|---|---|---|---|---|---|---|---|---|---|---|---|---|---|---|
| AP | 21 | 21 | RV | RV | NR | NR | NR | NR | NR | NR | NR | NR | NR | NR | NR | NR | NR | NR | NR | N/A |
| Coaches | 21 | 21 | RV | RV | RV | NR | NR | NR | NR | NR | NR | NR | NR | NR | NR | NR | NR | NR | NR | NR |

== See also ==
- 2014–15 Nebraska Cornhuskers women's basketball team
