= 2014–15 Northwestern State Demons basketball team =

American college basketball season

2014–15 Northwestern State Demons men's basketball

CIT, First round
- Conference: Southland Conference
- Record: 19–13 (13–5 Southland)
- Head coach: Mike McConathy (16th season)
- Assistant coaches: Jeff Moore; Bill Lewit; Jacob Spielbauer
- Home arena: Prather Coliseum (Capacity: 3,900)

2014–15 Southland Conference men's basketball standings
	Conf.				Overall
Team	W		L	PCT	W		L	PCT
Stephen F. Austin †	17	–	1	.944	29	–	5	.853
Sam Houston State	15	–	3	.833	26	–	9	.743
Texas A&M–CC	13	–	5	.722	20	–	14	.588
Northwestern State	13	–	5	.722	19	–	13	.594
Incarnate Word**	10	–	8	.556	18	–	11	.621
Lamar*	9	–	9	.500	15	–	15	.500
McNeese State	8	–	10	.444	15	–	16	.484
Houston Baptist*	7	–	11	.389	12	–	16	.429
Nicholls State	7	–	11	.389	10	–	19	.345
New Orleans	6	–	12	.333	11	–	18	.379
Southeastern Louisiana	6	–	12	.333	9	–	23	.281
Abilene Christian**	4	–	14	.222	10	–	21	.323
Central Arkansas*	2	–	16	.111	2	–	27	.069
† 2015 Southland tournament winner * ineligible for postseason due to APR penalties ** ineligible for postseason due to Div. I transition

The 2014–15 Northwestern State Demons basketball team represented Northwestern State University during the 2014–15 NCAA Division I men's basketball season. The Demons, led by 16th year head coach Mike McConathy, played their home games at Prather Coliseum and were members of the Southland Conference.

The Demons were picked to finish second (2nd) in both the Southland Conference Coaches' Poll and the Sports Information Directors Poll receiving one first place vote in the coaches' poll and three first place votes in the SID poll.

They finished the season 19–13, 13–5 in Southland play to finish in a tie for third place. They advanced to the semifinals of the Southland tournament where they lost to Stephen F. Austin. They were invited to the CollegeInsdier.com Tournament where they lost in the first round to UT Martin.

== Roster ==
ֶ

2014–15 Northwestern State Demons men's basketball team
Players
Coaches

Pos.	#	Name	Height	Weight	Year	Previous school	Hometown
G	0	Tra'von Joseph	6 ft 5 in (1.96 m)	200 lb (91 kg)	So	North Central HS	Morrow, Louisiana
F	1	Matt LeBato	6 ft 8 in (2.03 m)	220 lb (100 kg)	Sr	Sulphur HS; Baton Rouge Community College	Sulphur, Louisiana
G	2	Ta'Jon Welcome	6 ft 3 in (1.91 m)	175 lb (79 kg)	Jr	Booker T. Washington HS; Tyler JC	Houston, Texas
G	3	Devonte Hall	6 ft 1 in (1.85 m)	185 lb (84 kg)	Fr	Bossier HS	Bossier City, Louisiana
G/F	10	Reginald Kissoonial	6 ft 11 in (2.11 m)	195 lb (88 kg)	Fr	William M. Raines HS	Jacksonville, Florida
G	11	Paxson Guest	6 ft 5 in (1.96 m)	200 lb (91 kg)	Jr	Airline HS	Bossier City, Louisiana
G	12	Jalan West	5 ft 10 in (1.78 m)	175 lb (79 kg)	Jr	Bossier HS	Bossier City, Louisiana
F	13	Matt Killian	6 ft 5 in (1.96 m)	180 lb (82 kg)	Jr	Hornbeck HS	Hornbeck, Louisiana
G	21	Sabri Thompson	6 ft 3 in (1.91 m)	190 lb (86 kg)	So	Sanford HS	Newark, Delaware
G	22	Tony Dobbinson	5 ft 10 in (1.78 m)	175 lb (79 kg)	Jr	Westhill HS; McCook CC	Stamford, Connecticut
G	23	Zeek Woodley	6 ft 2 in (1.88 m)	200 lb (91 kg)	So	Pelican All-Saints HS	Pelican, Louisiana
F	33	Ryan King	6 ft 7 in (2.01 m)	205 lb (93 kg)	Sr	Oak Ridge Military Academy; Wallace State CC (AL)	Greensboro, North Carolina
C	40	Marvin Frazier	6 ft 9 in (2.06 m)	220 lb (100 kg)	Sr	Zwolle HS	Zwolle, Louisiana
F	42	Deji Adekunle	6 ft 11 in (2.11 m)	230 lb (104 kg)	Jr	Woodside HS; Williston State College	London, England
G	44	Peyton Prudhomme	6 ft 4 in (1.93 m)	195 lb (88 kg)	Fr	Westwind Preparatory Academy	Newport Beach, California

Head coach

- Mike McConathy

Assistant coach(es)

- Jeff Moore
- Bill Lewit
- Jacob Spielbauer

Legend

- (C) Team captain
- (S) Suspended
- (I) Ineligible
- (W) Walk-on
- Injured
- Current redshirt

Roster
Last update: 09/23/2014

== Radio ==
Most games will be carried live on the Demon Sports Radio Network. There are three affiliates for the Demon Sports Radio Network.

- KZBL (Flagship)
- KSYR
- KTEZ

== Schedule ==
Date time, TV	Opponent	Result	Record	Site (attendance) city, state
Out of Conference
11/14/2014*; 7:00 pm, SECN	at Texas A&M	L 68–109	0–1	Reed Arena (5,254); College Station, Texas
11/17/2014*; 6:30 pm	Lyon	W 75–64	1–1	Prather Coliseum (1,301); Natchitoches, Louisiana
11/20/2014*; 7:00 pm	at LSU–Alexandria	W 89–79	2–1	The Fort (550); Alexandria, Louisiana
11/23/2014*; 2:00 pm, FSN/FCS	at No. 18 Oklahoma	L 68–90	2–2	Lloyd Noble Center (10,056); Norman, Oklahoma
11/25/2014*; 7:00 pm	at Texas Tech	L 64–75	2–3	United Spirit Arena (4,535); Lubbock, Texas
11/29/2014*; 3:00 pm	Missouri Valley	W 87–67	3–3	Prather Coliseum (1,140); Natchitoches, Louisiana
12/02/2014*; 6:30 pm	Louisiana Tech	L 88–99	3–4	Prather Coliseum (2,812); Natchitoches, Louisiana
12/09/2014*; 7:00 pm	at Louisiana–Monroe	L 74–82	3–5	Fant–Ewing Coliseum (1,082); Monroe, Louisiana
12/20/2014*; 3:00 pm	Louisiana–Lafayette	W 89–85	4–5	Prather Coliseum (1,240); Natchitoches, Louisiana
12/28/2014*; 2:30 pm	Arkansas	L 92–100	4–6	Bud Walton Arena (15,738); Fayetteville, Arkansas
12/31/2014*; 6:30 pm	Louisiana College	W 94–68	5–6	Prather Coliseum (1,133); Natchitoches, Louisiana
Conference Games
01/03/2015; 7:00 pm	Houston Baptist	W 99–78	6–6 (1–0)	Sharp Gymnasium (719); Houston, Texas
01/05/2015; 8:00 pm	at Sam Houston State	L 64–75	6–7 (1–1)	Bernard Johnson Coliseum (779); Huntsville, Texas
01/10/2015; 3:00 pm	Incarnate Word	W 103–101	7–7 (2–1)	Prather Coliseum (1,412); Natchitoches, Louisiana
01/13/2015; 6:30 pm	Abilene Christian	L 81–95	7–8 (2–2)	Prather Coliseum (1,525); Natchitoches, Louisiana
01/17/2015; 3:00 pm	Lamar	W 96–84	8–8 (3–2)	Prather Coliseum (1,823); Natchitoches, Louisiana
01/20/2015; 7:00 pm	at Texas A&M–Corpus Christi	L 76–88	8–9 (3–3)	American Bank Center (945); Corpus Christi, Texas
01/24/2015; 3:00 pm	McNeese State	W 93–67	9–9 (4–3)	Prather Coliseum (2,712); Natchitoches, Louisiana
01/26/2015; 6:30 pm	Nicholls State	W 80–51	10–9 (5–3)	Prather Coliseum (2,018); Natchitoches, Louisiana
01/31/2015; 7:00 pm	at Southeastern Louisiana	W 88–73	11–9 (6–3)	University Center (895); Hammond, Louisiana
02/03/2015; 7:00 pm	at Central Arkansas	W 110–108	12–9 (7–3)	Farris Center (2,120); Conway, Arkansas
02/09/2015; 6:30 pm	Stephen F. Austin	L 82–92	12–10 (7–4)	Prather Coliseum (3,612); Natchitoches, Louisiana
02/14/2015; 3:00 pm	at McNeese State	W 75–72	13–10 (8–4)	Burton Coliseum (1,336); Lake Charles, Louisiana
02/16/2015; 6:30 pm	Central Arkansas	W 86–70	14–10 (9–4)	Prather Coliseum (1,231); Natchitoches, Louisiana
02/21/2015; 6:15 pm	at New Orleans	W 87–84	15–10 (10–4)	Lakefront Arena (510); New Orleans, Louisiana
02/23/2014; 6:30 pm	at Nicholls State	W 79–57	16–10 (11–4)	Stopher Gym (791); Thibodaux, Louisiana
03/02/2015; 6:15 pm	Southeastern Louisiana	W 92–79	17–10 (12–4)	Prather Coliseum (1,921); Natchitoches, Louisiana
03/05/2015; 8:00 pm, ESPN3	at Stephen F. Austin	L 66–92	17–11 (12–5)	William R. Johnson Coliseum (5,838); Nacogdoches, Texas
03/07/2015; 3:00 pm	New Orleans	W 88–78	18–11 (13–5)	Prather Coliseum (2,442); Natchitoches, Louisiana
Southland tournament
03/12/2015; 5:00 pm	vs. McNeese State; Quarterfinals	W 96–89	19–11	Merrell Center (1,213); Katy, Texas
03/13/2015; 5:00 pm, ESPN3	vs. Stephen F. Austin; Semifinals	L 79–91	19–12	Merrell Center (3,268); Katy, Texas
CIT
03/19/2015*; 6:30 pm	UT Martin; First round	L 79–104	19–13	Prather Coliseum (2,712); Natchitoches, Louisiana
*Non-conference game. ^{#}Rankings from AP Poll. (#) Tournament seedings in parentheses. All times are in Central Time.

== See also ==
- 2014–15 Northwestern State Lady Demons basketball team
