= 2014–15 Southeastern Louisiana Lions basketball team =

American college basketball season

2014–15 Southeastern Louisiana Lions men's basketball
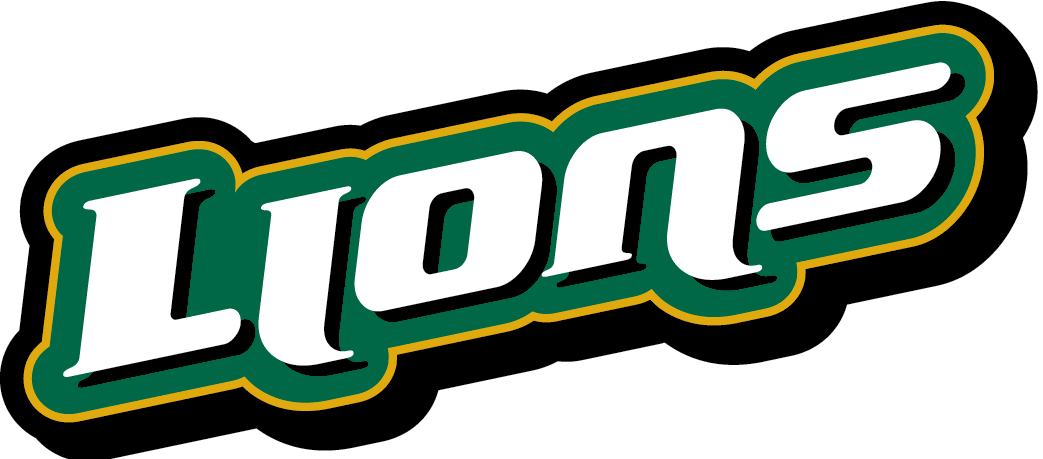
- Conference: Southland Conference
- Record: 9–23 (6–12 Southland)
- Head coach: Jay Ladner (1st season)
- Assistant coaches: Errol Gauff; Kyle Roane; Tyson Waterman
- Home arena: University Center (Capacity: 7,500)

2014–15 Southland Conference men's basketball standings
	Conf.				Overall
Team	W		L	PCT	W		L	PCT
Stephen F. Austin †	17	–	1	.944	29	–	5	.853
Sam Houston State	15	–	3	.833	26	–	9	.743
Texas A&M–CC	13	–	5	.722	20	–	14	.588
Northwestern State	13	–	5	.722	19	–	13	.594
Incarnate Word**	10	–	8	.556	18	–	11	.621
Lamar*	9	–	9	.500	15	–	15	.500
McNeese State	8	–	10	.444	15	–	16	.484
Houston Baptist*	7	–	11	.389	12	–	16	.429
Nicholls State	7	–	11	.389	10	–	19	.345
New Orleans	6	–	12	.333	11	–	18	.379
Southeastern Louisiana	6	–	12	.333	9	–	23	.281
Abilene Christian**	4	–	14	.222	10	–	21	.323
Central Arkansas*	2	–	16	.111	2	–	27	.069
† 2015 Southland tournament winner * ineligible for postseason due to APR penalties ** ineligible for postseason due to Div. I transition

The 2014–15 Southeastern Louisiana Lions basketball team represented Southeastern Louisiana University during the 2014–15 NCAA Division I men's basketball season. The Lions, led by first year head coach Jay Ladner, played their home games at the University Center and are members of the Southland Conference.

Jay Ladner was hired at the end of the 2013-14 after winning the NJCAA Division I National Championship at Jones County Junior College.

The Lions were picked to finish seventh (7th) in both the Southland Conference Coaches' Poll and the Sports Information Directors Poll.

The Lions qualified for the 2015 Southland Conference tournament as the eighth seed due to ineligibility of three teams which finished higher in the regular season play. The team played against number five seed McNeese State in the first round of the tournament losing in overtime 60-62. The Lions's final overall record for the 2014–15 season was 9–23 and 6–12 in conference play tied for tenth place.

== Roster ==
ֶ

2014–15 Southeastern Louisiana Lions men's basketball team
Players
Coaches

Pos.	#	Name	Height	Weight	Year	Previous school	Hometown
G	0	Jimmie Duplessis	6 ft 4 in (1.93 m)	210 lb (95 kg)	Jr	Edna Karr HS; Independence (KS) CC	New Orleans, LA
G	2	Dimi Cook	6 ft 2 in (1.88 m)	185 lb (84 kg)	Fr	Gulfport HS	Gulfport, MS
G	3	Joshua Filmore	6 ft 0 in (1.83 m)	175 lb (79 kg)	So	Wekiva HS	Orlando, FL
G	4	Cedric Jenkins	6 ft 1 in (1.85 m)	202 lb (92 kg)	GS	Riverside Academy; Southern Miss	LaPlace, LA
G	5	JaMichael Hawkins	6 ft 4 in (1.93 m)	185 lb (84 kg)	Sr	Wingfield HS; Mississippi Gulf Coast CC	Raymond, MS
G	10	Zay Jackson	6 ft 0 in (1.83 m)	178 lb (81 kg)	Jr	St. Thomas Aquinas HS; Murray State	Hammond, LA
F	11	Daniel Grieves	6 ft 7 in (2.01 m)	213 lb (97 kg)	Jr	St. Stanislaus College; ULM	Bay St. Louis, MS
G	12	Justin Lobell	6 ft 1 in (1.85 m)	180 lb (82 kg)	Fr	French Settlement HS	French Settlement, LA
G	15	Andrew Guillory	6 ft 3 in (1.91 m)	205 lb (93 kg)	Jr	North Crowley HS; Hill College	Fort Worth, TX
F	20	Bret Barclay	6 ft 6 in (1.98 m)	210 lb (95 kg)	Fr	Crown Point HS	Crown Point, IN
C	22	Devonte Upson	6 ft 9 in (2.06 m)	205 lb (93 kg)	Sr	Harrison HS (CO); Trinidad State JC	Amarillo, TX
F	23	James Currington	6 ft 6 in (1.98 m)	192 lb (87 kg)	So	Paul W. Bryant HS; Mississippi Valley State	Tuscaloosa, AL
F	33	Onochie Ochie	6 ft 6 in (1.98 m)	210 lb (95 kg)	Sr	Westover HS	Albany, GA

Head coach

- Jay Ladner

Assistant coach(es)

- Errol Gauff
- Kyle Roane
- Tyson Waterman

Legend

- (C) Team captain
- (S) Suspended
- (I) Ineligible
- (W) Walk-on
- Injured
- Current redshirt

Roster
Last update: 11/09/2014

== Schedule ==
Date time, TV	Opponent	Result	Record	Site (attendance) city, state
Exhibition
11/06/2014*; 6:00 pm	Loyola New Orleans	W 97–81		University Center (800); Hammond, LA
Non-conference
11/14/2014*; 7:00 pm	at Oklahoma State	L 55–83	0–1	Gallagher-Iba Arena (6,125); Stillwater, OK
11/16/2014*; 2:00 pm, FSN/FCS	at No. 19 Oklahoma	L 53–78	0–2	Lloyd Noble Center (9,626); Norman, OK
11/22/2014*; 7:00 pm	at Western Illinois	L 57–60	0–3	Western Hall (978); Macomb, IL
11/24/2014*; 7:00 pm	Tennessee Tech; Green Wave Classic	L 62–81	0–4	Eblen Center (1,024); Cookeville, TN
11/26/2014*; 7:00 pm	Tennessee Tech; Green Wave Classic	W 86–65	1–4	University Center (550); Hammond, LA
11/28/2014*; 7:00 pm	at Tulane; Green Wave Classic	L 61–71	1–5	Devlin Fieldhouse (983); New Orleans, LA
11/30/2014*; 10:50 am	vs. Langston; Green Wave Classic	W 92–80	2–5	Devlin Fieldhouse (N/A); New Orleans, LA
12/02/2014*; 8:00 pm, ROOT	at No. 9 Gonzaga	L 57–76	2–6	McCarthey Athletic Center (6,000); Spokane, WA
12/06/2014*; 6:00 pm	at Southeast Missouri State	L 59–63	2–7	Show Me Center (N/A); Cape Girardeau, MO
12/16/2014*; 8:00 pm	at UTEP	L 62–80	2–8	Don Haskins Center (6,811); El Paso, TX
12/19/2014*; 7:00 pm	Winthrop	W 81–71	3–8	University Center (515); Hammond, LA
12/22/2014*; 6:00 pm, ESPN3	at UCF	L 65–70	3–9	CFE Arena (3,389); Orlando, FL
12/23/2014*; 12:00 pm, ESPN3	at South Florida	L 63–78	3–10	USF Sun Dome (2,818); Tampa, FL
Exhibition
12/29/2014*; 6:00 pm	Dillard	W 88–47		University Center (547); Hammond, LA
Conference Games
01/05/2015; 8:00 pm	at Stephen F. Austin	L 66–81	3–11 (0–1)	William R. Johnson Coliseum (2,183); Nacogdoches, TX
01/10/2015; 7:00 pm	Houston Baptist	W 87–67	4–11 (1–1)	University Center (585); Hammond, LA
01/12/2015; 7:00 pm	Sam Houston State	L 59–72	4–12 (1–2)	University Center (390); Hammond, LA
01/17/2015; 4:00 pm	at Incarnate Word	W 108–98 ^{2OT}	5–12 (2–2)	McDermott Center (1,250); San Antonio, TX
01/19/2015; 7:00 pm	at Lamar	L 50–57	5–13 (2–3)	Montagne Center (1,776); Beaumont, TX
01/26/2015; 7:00 pm	Texas A&M–Corpus Christi	L 61–70	5–14 (2–4)	University Center (615); Hammond, LA
01/31/2015; 7:00 pm	Northwestern State	L 73–88	5–15 (2–5)	University Center (895); Hammond, LA
02/02/2015; 7:00 pm	McNeese State	L 60–73	5–16 (2–6)	University Center (700); Hammond, LA
02/07/2015; 4:00 pm	at Abilene Christian	W 65–52	6–16 (3–6)	Moody Coliseum (1,005); Abilene, TX
02/10/2014; 7:00 pm	Central Arkansas	W 83–58	7–16 (4–6)	University Center (573); Hammond, LA
02/14/2015; 3:30 pm	at Nicholls State	W 65–59	8–16 (5–6)	Stopher Gym (418); Thibodaux, LA
02/16/2015; 7:00 pm	at McNeese State	L 69–74	8–17 (5–7)	Burton Coliseum (945); Lake Charles, LA
02/21/2015; 7:00 pm, ESPN3	Abilene Christian	W 55–54	9–17 (6–7)	University Center (945); Hammond, LA
02/23/2015; 7:00 pm	New Orleans	L 73–74	9–18 (6–8)	University Center (749); Hammond, LA
02/28/2015; 4:00 pm	at Central Arkansas	L 72–74	9–19 (6–9)	Farris Center (1,112); Conway, AR
03/02/2015; 6:30 pm	at Northwestern State	L 79–92	9–20 (6–10)	Prather Coliseum (1,921); Natchitoches, LA
03/05/2015; 7:45 pm	at New Orleans	L 79–85	9–21 (6–11)	Lakefront Arena (1,048); New Orleans, LA
03/07/2015; 7:00 pm	Nicholls State	L 69–75	9–22 (6–12)	University Center (659); Hammond, LA
2015 Southland tournament
03/11/2015; 5:00 pm	vs. McNeese State	L 60–62 ^{OT}	9–23	Merrell Center (1,029); Katy, TX
*Non-conference game. ^{#}Rankings from AP Poll. (#) Tournament seedings in parentheses. All times are in Central Time.

== See also ==
- 2014–15 Southeastern Louisiana Lady Lions basketball team
