= 2014–15 Sam Houston State Bearkats men's basketball team =

American college basketball season

2014–15 Sam Houston State Bearkats men's basketball

CIT, Second round
- Conference: Southland Conference
- Record: 26–9 (15–3 Southland)
- Head coach: Jason Hooten (5th season)
- Assistant coaches: Chris Mudge (5th season); Matt Braeuer (2nd season)
- Home arena: Bernard Johnson Coliseum

2014–15 Southland Conference men's basketball standings
	Conf.				Overall
Team	W		L	PCT	W		L	PCT
Stephen F. Austin †	17	–	1	.944	29	–	5	.853
Sam Houston State	15	–	3	.833	26	–	9	.743
Texas A&M–CC	13	–	5	.722	20	–	14	.588
Northwestern State	13	–	5	.722	19	–	13	.594
Incarnate Word**	10	–	8	.556	18	–	11	.621
Lamar*	9	–	9	.500	15	–	15	.500
McNeese State	8	–	10	.444	15	–	16	.484
Houston Baptist*	7	–	11	.389	12	–	16	.429
Nicholls State	7	–	11	.389	10	–	19	.345
New Orleans	6	–	12	.333	11	–	18	.379
Southeastern Louisiana	6	–	12	.333	9	–	23	.281
Abilene Christian**	4	–	14	.222	10	–	21	.323
Central Arkansas*	2	–	16	.111	2	–	27	.069
† 2015 Southland tournament winner * ineligible for postseason due to APR penalties ** ineligible for postseason due to Div. I transition

The 2014–15 Sam Houston State Bearkats men's basketball team represented Sam Houston State University during the 2014–15 NCAA Division I men's basketball season. The Bearkats, led by fifth year head coach Jason Hooten, played their home games at the Bernard Johnson Coliseum and were members of the Southland Conference.

The Bearkats were picked to finish third (3rd) in the Southland Conference Coaches' Poll and tied for third (3rd) in the Sports Information Directors Poll.

They finished the season 26–9, 15–3 in Southland play to finish in second place. They advanced to the championship game of the Southland tournament where they lost to Stephen F. Austin. They were invited to the CollegeInsider.com Tournament where they defeated UNC Wilmington in the first round before losing in the second round to Louisiana–Lafayette.

== Roster ==
ֶ

2014–15 Sam Houston State Bearkats men's basketball team
Players
Coaches

Pos.	#	Name	Height	Weight	Year	Previous school	Hometown
G	1	Jabari Peters	6 ft 4 in (1.93 m)	180 lb (82 kg)	Sr	Seward County CC	Brooklyn, NY
G	2	Marquet McKinney	6 ft 3 in (1.91 m)	215 lb (98 kg)	Sr	Cypress Springs HS	Houston, TX
G	3	Dakrai Henderson	6 ft 2 in (1.88 m)	188 lb (85 kg)	So	Dawson HS	Pearland, TX
F	5	Jesse Lopez	6 ft 7 in (2.01 m)	200 lb (91 kg)	RS Fr	Bowie HS	El Paso, TX
G	11	DeMarcus Gatlin	6 ft 4 in (1.93 m)	200 lb (91 kg)	Sr	Bush HS	Houston, TX
G	12	Josh Delaney	6 ft 0 in (1.83 m)	170 lb (77 kg)	Fr	Harker Heights HS	Killeen, TX
G	15	Kaheem Ransom	6 ft 1 in (1.85 m)	180 lb (82 kg)	Sr	Seward County CC	Wichita, KS
G	20	Jamal Williams	6 ft 4 in (1.93 m)	190 lb (86 kg)	Fr	Episcopal HS	Houston, TX
G	21	Paul Baxter	6 ft 1 in (1.85 m)	180 lb (82 kg)	Jr	Bowie HS	Austin, TX
G	22	Mitch McCormick	6 ft 1 in (1.85 m)	180 lb (82 kg)	Jr	Montgomery HS	Montgomery, TX
F	24	Cody Mason	6 ft 7 in (2.01 m)	200 lb (91 kg)	Fr	Woodlands HS	The Woodlands, TX
F	32	Marcus Burwell	6 ft 5 in (1.96 m)	205 lb (93 kg)	Jr	Wallace State CC (AL)	Virginia Beach, VA
F	33	Albert Almanza	6 ft 5 in (1.96 m)	195 lb (88 kg)	Fr	Saint Stephens HS	Austin, TX
F	34	Aurimas Majauskas	6 ft 7 in (2.01 m)	245 lb (111 kg)	So	Future Prep	Marijampolė, Lithuania
C	35	Michael Holyfield	6 ft 11 in (2.11 m)	270 lb (122 kg)	Sr	Manzano HS	Albuquerque, NM
G	42	Kyle McLeroy	6 ft 1 in (1.85 m)	195 lb (88 kg)	Jr	Cy Ranch; Mary Hardin–Baylor	Cypress, TX
F	55	Sean Goodwin	6 ft 7 in (2.01 m)	230 lb (104 kg)	Jr	Hutchinson HS; Butler CC	Hutchinson, KS

Head coach

- Jason Hooten (Tarleton State)

Assistant coach(es)

- Chris Mudge (Texas)
- Matt Braeuer (Wichita State)

Legend

- (C) Team captain
- (S) Suspended
- (I) Ineligible
- (W) Walk-on
- Injured
- Current redshirt

Roster
Last update: 09/24/2014

== Schedule ==
Source: Access Date: January 17, 2015

Date time, TV	Opponent	Result	Record	Site (attendance) city, state
Regular season
11/14/2014*; 12:00 pm	Austin	W 100–52	1–0	Bernard Johnson Coliseum (690); Huntsville, TX
11/16/2014*; 7:00 pm, MWN	at UNLV	L 57–59	1–1	Thomas & Mack Center (10,902); Paradise, NV
11/21/2014*; 8:00 pm	vs. South Dakota; Coaches vs. Cancer Classic	W 93–85 ^{3OT}	2–1	Webster Bank Arena (1,733); Fairfield, CT
11/22/2014*; 6:00 pm	at Fairfield; Coaches vs. Cancer Classic	W 74–60	3–1	Webster Bank Arena (1,708); Fairfield, CT
11/23/2014*; 11:00 am	vs. Wofford; Coaches vs. Cancer Classic	L 53–64	3–2	Webster Bank Arena (1,422); Fairfield, CT
11/29/2014*; 4:30 pm	Southwest	W 111–51	4–2	Bernard Johnson Coliseum (663); Huntsville, TX
12/03/2014*; 7:00 pm, SECN	at Texas A&M	L 63–66	4–3	Reed Arena (4,746); College Station, TX
12/06/2014*; 4:30 pm	Texas–Pan American	W 78–59	5–3	Bernard Johnson Coliseum (678); Huntsville, TX
12/13/2014*; 6:00 pm, SECN	at LSU	L 67–76	5–4	Pete Maravich Assembly Center (7,295); Baton Rouge, LA
12/16/2014*; 6:30 pm	Eastern Washington	W 76–52	6–4	Bernard Johnson Coliseum (661); Huntsville, TX
12/20/2014*; 4:30 pm	Prairie View A&M	W 61–44	7–4	Bernard Johnson Coliseum (626); Huntsville, TX
12/29/2014*; 4:30 pm	Howard Payne	W 102–47	8–4	Bernard Johnson Coliseum (654); Huntsville, TX
01/03/2015; 4:30 pm	Incarnate Word	W 84–78	9–4 (1–0)	Bernard Johnson Coliseum (771); Huntsville, TX
01/05/2015; 8:00 pm	Northwestern State	W 75–64	10–4 (2–0)	Bernard Johnson Coliseum (779); Huntsville, TX
01/10/2015; 6:15 pm	at New Orleans	W 68–62	11–4 (3–0)	Lakefront Arena (806); New Orleans, LA
01/12/2015; 7:00 pm	at Southeastern Louisiana	W 72–59	12–4 (4–0)	University Center (390); Hammond, LA
01/17/2015; 4:30 pm	McNeese State	W 69–60	13–4 (5–0)	Bernard Johnson Coliseum (1,540); Huntsville, TX
01/20/2015; 6:30 pm	Nicholls State	W 62–39	14–4 (6–0)	Stopher Gym (1,027); Natchitoches, LA
01/24/2015; 4:30 pm	Stephen F. Austin	L 68–79	14–5 (6–1)	Bernard Johnson Coliseum (3,607); Huntsville, TX
01/26/2015; 7:00 pm	at Abilene Christian	W 80–63	15–5 (7–1)	Moody Coliseum (1,273); Abilene, TX
01/31/2015; 4:30 pm, ESPN3	Houston Baptist	W 63–52	16–5 (8–1)	Bernard Johnson Coliseum (1,075); Huntsville, TX
02/02/2015; 6:30 pm, RTSW	Lamar	W 79–50	17–5 (9–1)	Bernard Johnson Coliseum (1,081); Huntsville, TX
02/07/2015; 4:30 pm	Texas A&M–Corpus Christi	W 67–59	18–5 (10–1)	Bernard Johnson Coliseum (2,097); Huntsville, TX
02/09/2015*; 6:30 pm	Texas College	W 88–39	19–5	Bernard Johnson Coliseum (987); Huntsville, TX
02/14/2015; 7:30 pm	at Houston Baptist	W 87–64	20–5 (11–1)	Sharp Gymnasium (951); Houston, TX
02/16/2015; 6:30 pm	Abilene Christian	W 71–49	21–5 (12–1)	Bernard Johnson Coliseum (1,136); Huntsville, TX
02/21/2015; 4:00 pm	at Central Arkansas	W 70–42	22–5 (13–1)	Farris Center (1,325); Conway, AR
02/28/2015; 7:00 pm, RTSW	at Texas A&M–Corpus Christi	L 59–61	22–6 (13–2)	American Bank Center (3,057); Corpus Christi, TX
03/02/2015; 6:30 pm	Central Arkansas	W 76–49	23–6 (14–2)	Bernard Johnson Coliseum (1,353); Huntsville, TX
03/05/2015; 7:30 pm	at Lamar	W 67–61	24–6 (15–2)	Montagne Center (2,418); Beaumont, TX
03/07/2015; 6:00 pm	at Stephen F. Austin	L 55–64	24–7 (15–3)	William R. Johnson Coliseum (7,328); Nacogdoches, TX
Southland tournament
03/13/2015; 7:30 pm, ESPN3	vs. Texas A&M–Corpus Christi; Semifinals	W 70–67	25–7	Merrell Center (3,268); Katy, TX
03/14/2015; 8:30 pm, ESPN2	vs. Stephen F. Austin; Championship Game	L 70–83	25–8	Merrell Center (5,016); Katy, TX
CIT
03/18/2015*; 6:30 pm	UNC Wilmington; First round	W 87–71	26–8	Bernard Johnson Coliseum (567); Huntsville, TX
03/21/2015*; 2:00 pm	Louisiana–Lafayette; Second round	L 70–71	26–9	Bernard Johnson Coliseum (772); Huntsville, TX
*Non-conference game. (#) Tournament seedings in parentheses. All times are in Central Time.

== See also ==
- 2014–15 Sam Houston State Bearkats women's basketball team
