= 2014–15 Incarnate Word Cardinals men's basketball team =

American college basketball season

2014–15 Incarnate Word Cardinals men's basketball

CIT, First round
- Conference: Southland Conference
- Record: 18–11 (10–8 Southland)
- Head coach: Ken Burmeister (9th season)
- Assistant coaches: Bilal Batley; Brian Curtis; John Smith
- Home arena: McDermott Convocation Center (Capacity: 2,000)

2014–15 Southland Conference men's basketball standings
	Conf.				Overall
Team	W		L	PCT	W		L	PCT
Stephen F. Austin †	17	–	1	.944	29	–	5	.853
Sam Houston State	15	–	3	.833	26	–	9	.743
Texas A&M–CC	13	–	5	.722	20	–	14	.588
Northwestern State	13	–	5	.722	19	–	13	.594
Incarnate Word**	10	–	8	.556	18	–	11	.621
Lamar*	9	–	9	.500	15	–	15	.500
McNeese State	8	–	10	.444	15	–	16	.484
Houston Baptist*	7	–	11	.389	12	–	16	.429
Nicholls State	7	–	11	.389	10	–	19	.345
New Orleans	6	–	12	.333	11	–	18	.379
Southeastern Louisiana	6	–	12	.333	9	–	23	.281
Abilene Christian**	4	–	14	.222	10	–	21	.323
Central Arkansas*	2	–	16	.111	2	–	27	.069
† 2015 Southland tournament winner * ineligible for postseason due to APR penalties ** ineligible for postseason due to Div. I transition

The 2014–15 Incarnate Word Cardinals men's basketball team represented the University of the Incarnate Word during the 2014–15 NCAA Division I men's basketball season. The Cardinals were led by ninth year head coach Ken Burmeister and played their home games at McDermott Convocation Center. They were members of the Southland Conference.

This was year 2 of a 4-year transitional period for Incarnate Word from DII to DI. During year 2 they will play a normal conference schedule. They are DI for scheduling purposes and are also to be considered as a DI RPI member.

Although Incarnate Word was classified as a DI school for scheduling purposes in years 2–4 and can win the regular season conference title, they cannot participate in the conference tournament until the 2017–18 season, at which time they will also be able to enter the NCAA Tournament, should they win the conference.

The Cardinals were picked to finish sixth (6th) in both the Southland Conference Coaches' Poll and the Sports Information Directors Poll.

They finished the season 18–11, 10–8 in Southland play to finish in fifth place. They were invited to the CollegeInsider.com Postseason Tournament, their first ever DI postseason appearance, where they lost in the first round to Louisiana–Lafayette.

== Audio streaming ==
All Incarnate Word games were broadcast on KKYX's website. KUIW Radio also produced a student media broadcast for each non-televised home game, that was available online, and they provided streaming of all non-televised home games were shown via UIW TV.

== Roster ==
2014–15 Incarnate Word Cardinals men's basketball team
Players
Coaches

Pos.	#	Name	Height	Weight	Year	Previous school	Hometown
PG	0	Jontrell Walker	6 ft 0 in (1.83 m)	186 lb (84 kg)	Fr	Aurora West	Aurora, Illinois
F	1	Derall Green	6 ft 7 in (2.01 m)	214 lb (97 kg)	So	Klein Forest; Wichita State University	Houston, Texas
G	2	Mitchell Badillo	5 ft 10 in (1.78 m)	175 lb (79 kg)	Jr	Cy Falls	Houston, Texas
G	4	Kyle Hittle	6 ft 4 in (1.93 m)	195 lb (88 kg)	Jr	New Bruanfels	New Braunfels, Texas
F	5	Traylin Farris	6 ft 8 in (2.03 m)	222 lb (101 kg)	Fr	Manvel	Pearland, Texas
G	10	Shawn Johnson	6 ft 4 in (1.93 m)	195 lb (88 kg)	Fr	Alief Hastings	New Orleans, Louisiana
G	11	Denzel Livingston	6 ft 4 in (1.93 m)	155 lb (70 kg)	Sr	Waltrip	Houston, Texas
F	12	Jerred Kite	6 ft 10 in (2.08 m)	210 lb (95 kg)	So	Antonian High School; Texas A&M-Corpus Christi	San Antonio, Texas
G	15	Sam Burmeister	6 ft 4 in (1.93 m)	195 lb (88 kg)	So	Churchill	San Antonio, Texas
F	21	John Baker	6 ft 5 in (1.96 m)	223 lb (101 kg)	So	East Central	Adkins, Texas
G	22	Marcus Brock	5 ft 11 in (1.8 m)	180 lb (82 kg)	So	Madison	San Antonio, Texas
F	23	Austin Henry	6 ft 7 in (2.01 m)	233 lb (106 kg)	Fr	Steele High School	Cibolo, Texas
F	24	Phillip Johnson	6 ft 4 in (1.93 m)	185 lb (84 kg)	So	Edison High School	New Orleans, Louisiana
F	32	Winslo Barry	6 ft 10 in (2.08 m)	234 lb (106 kg)	Sr	Christian Life Center; Tyler JC	Nassau

Head coach

- Ken Burmeister (Saint Mary's)

Assistant coach(es)

- Prince Johnson (Incarnate Word)
- Brian Curtis (Incarnate Word)
- Daryl Ward (Incarnate Word)

Legend

- (C) Team captain
- (S) Suspended
- (I) Ineligible
- (W) Walk-on
- Injured
- Current redshirt

Roster
Last update: 2014-09-19

== Schedule and results ==
Date time, TV	Opponent	Result	Record	Site (attendance) city, state
Non-Conference
11/14/2014*; 8:00 pm	UT–Tyler	W 89–49	1–0	McDermott Center (1,082); San Antonio, TX
11/18/2014*; 7:00 pm	Huston–Tillotson	W 94–63	2–0	McDermott Center (568); San Antonio, TX
11/22/2014*; 11:00 am	at Princeton	W 79–68	3–0	Jadwin Gymnasium (1,554); Princeton, NJ
11/24/2014*; 7:00 pm	Texas A&M International	W 105–83	4–0	McDermott Center (462); San Antonio, TX
12/04/2014*; 7:00 pm	St. Edward's	W 85–68	5–0	McDermott Center (505); San Antonio, TX
12/08/2014*; 7:00 pm	at UTEP	L 65–81	5–1	Don Haskins Center (6,570); El Paso, TX
12/10/2014*; 7:00 pm, ESPN3	at Nebraska	W 74–73	6–1	Pinnacle Bank Arena (15,275); Lincoln, NE
12/17/2014*; 7:00 pm	at Grand Canyon	W 82–80	7–1	GCU Arena (4,692); Phoenix, AZ
12/20/2014*; 6:00 pm	at UMKC	W 114–110 ^{3OT}	8–1	Municipal Auditorium (1,473); Kansas City, MO
12/22/2014*; 7:00 pm, ESPN3	at Tulsa	L 47–76	8–2	Reynolds Center (4,209); Tulsa, OK
Conference Games
01/03/2015; 4:30 pm	at Sam Houston State	L 78–84	8–3 (0–1)	Bernard Johnson Coliseum (771); Huntsville, TX
01/10/2015; 3:00 pm	at Northwestern State	L 101–103	8–4 (0–2)	Prather Coliseum (1,412); Natchitoches, LA
01/12/2015; 4:00 pm	New Orleans	W 97–66	9–4 (1–2)	McDermott Center (417); San Antonio, TX
01/17/2015; 4:00 pm	Southeastern Louisiana	L 98–108 ^{2OT}	9–5 (1–3)	McDermott Center (1,250); San Antonio, TX
01/24/2015; 4:00 pm	at Abilene Christian	W 77–61	10–5 (2–3)	Moody Coliseum (1,325); Abilene, TX
01/26/2015; 7:00 pm	McNeese State	W 86–84	11–5 (3–3)	McDermott Center (672); San Antonio, TX
01/31/2015; 3:30 pm	at Nicholls State	W 69–58	12–5 (4–3)	Stopher Gym (768); Thibodaux, LA
02/03/2015; 7:00 pm	at Texas A&M–Corpus Christi	L 70–71	12–6 (4–4)	American Bank Center (1,283); Corpus Christi, TX
02/07/2015; 7:30 pm, ESPN3	Lamar	W 78–72	13–6 (5–4)	McDermott Center (1,710); San Antonio, TX
02/10/2015; 7:00 pm	Nicholls State	W 73–64	14–6 (6–4)	McDermott Center (510); San Antonio, TX
02/13/2015; 4:00 pm	at Central Arkansas	W 77–67	15–6 (7–4)	Farris Center (688); Conway, AR
02/16/2015; 7:00 pm	Stephen F. Austin	L 76–90	15–7 (7–5)	McDermott Center (1,112); San Antonio, TX
02/21/2015; 7:00 pm	Texas A&M–Corpus Christi	W 74–68	16–7 (8–5)	McDermott Center (1,200); San Antonio, TX
02/23/2015; 7:00 pm	Houston Baptist	W 77–64	17–7 (9–5)	McDermott Center (802); San Antonio, TX
02/28/2015; 6:00 pm	at Lamar	L 66–79	17–8 (9–6)	Montagne Center (2,005); Beaumont, TX
03/02/2015; 7:00 pm	at Stephen F. Austin	L 62–83	17–9 (9–7)	William R. Johnson Coliseum (3,194); Nacogdoches, TX
03/05/2015; 8:00 pm	Abilene Christian	W 64–52	18–9 (10–7)	McDermott Center (1,427); San Antonio, TX
03/07/2015; 7:00 pm	at Houston Baptist	L 77–78	18–10 (10–8)	Sharp Gymnasium (1,008); Houston, TX
CIT
03/17/2015*; 7:00 pm	Louisiana–Lafayette; First round	L 68–83	18–11	McDermott Center (1,811); San Antonio, TX
*Non-conference game. ^{#}Rankings from AP Poll. (#) Tournament seedings in parentheses. All times are in Central Time.

== See also ==
- 2014–15 Incarnate Word Cardinals women's basketball team
