= 2014–15 Alabama State Hornets basketball team =

American college basketball season

2014–15 Alabama State Hornets men's basketball
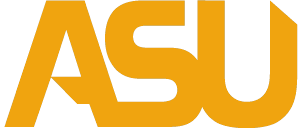
- Conference: Southwestern Athletic Conference
- Record: 19–10 (14–4 SWAC)
- Head coach: Lewis Jackson (10th season)
- Assistant coaches: Anthony Sewell; Steve Rogers; Michael Curry
- Home arena: Dunn–Oliver Acadome

2014–15 SWAC men's basketball standings
	Conf.				Overall
Team	W		L	PCT	W		L	PCT
Texas Southern †	16	–	2	.889	22	–	13	.629
Alabama State*	14	–	4	.778	19	–	10	.655
Southern*	13	–	5	.722	18	–	17	.514
Prairie View A&M	12	–	6	.667	15	–	18	.455
Arkansas–Pine Bluff*	9	–	9	.500	12	–	20	.375
Jackson State	9	–	9	.500	11	–	21	.344
Alabama A&M	8	–	10	.444	9	–	20	.310
Mississippi Valley State	5	–	13	.278	6	–	26	.188
Alcorn State	4	–	14	.222	6	–	26	.188
Grambling State	0	–	18	.000	2	–	27	.069
† 2015 SWAC tournament winner *ineligible for postseason play due to NCAA violations

The 2014–15 Alabama State Hornets basketball team represented Alabama State University during the 2014–15 NCAA Division I men's basketball season. The Hornets, led by tenth year head coach Lewis Jackson, played their home games at the Dunn–Oliver Acadome as members of the Southwestern Athletic Conference. They finished the season 19–10, 14–4 in SWAC play to finish in second place. Due to Academic Progress Rate penalties, the Hornets were ineligible for the postseason. However, they were allowed to participate in the SWAC tournament where they advanced to the semifinals where they lost to Southern.

== Roster ==
2014–15 Alabama State Hornets men's basketball team
Players
Coaches

Pos.	#	Name	Height	Weight	Year	Previous school	Hometown
C	00	Wendell Lewis	6 ft 10 in (2.08 m)	260 lb (118 kg)	Sr	Mississippi State	Salem, AL
G/F	1	Chidozie Omile	6 ft 5 in (1.96 m)	210 lb (95 kg)	Jr	Hartford CC	Woodbridge, VA
F	2	Luther Page	6 ft 6 in (1.98 m)	190 lb (86 kg)	Sr	Father Gabriel HS	Ann Arbor, MI
G	3	DeMarcus Robinson	5 ft 10 in (1.78 m)	165 lb (75 kg)	Sr	Snead State CC	Jonesboro, GA
F	4	Brandon Graham	6 ft 7 in (2.01 m)	195 lb (88 kg)	Sr	Snead State CC	Hampton, VA
G/F	5	Bobby Brown	6 ft 6 in (1.98 m)	185 lb (84 kg)	Jr	Lithia Springs HS	Atlanta, GA
G	12	Jamel Waters	5 ft 9 in (1.75 m)	160 lb (73 kg)	Jr	Ramsay HS	Birmingham, AL
F	14	Tony Armstrong	6 ft 6 in (1.98 m)	185 lb (84 kg)	RS So	G. W. Carver HS	Montgomery, AL
G/F	20	Billy Ingram	6 ft 6 in (1.98 m)	185 lb (84 kg)	RS So	Sumter Central HS	Bellamy, AL
G	21	Jamar Pope	6 ft 4 in (1.93 m)	175 lb (79 kg)	Jr	Marion Military	Huntsville, AL
F	22	Maurice Strong	6 ft 5 in (1.96 m)	210 lb (95 kg)	Sr	Aiken Technical College	Swainsboro, GA
G	24	Darius Sizemore	6 ft 4 in (1.93 m)	205 lb (93 kg)	So	Mundy's Mill HS	Jonesboro, GA
F	25	Darius Scott	6 ft 5 in (1.96 m)	215 lb (98 kg)	Jr	Gillette College	Atlanta, GA
G	30	Terrance LeFlore	6 ft 1 in (1.85 m)	170 lb (77 kg)	So	Wetumpka HS	Wetumpka, AL
C	31	Anthony Jacob	6 ft 9 in (2.06 m)	335 lb (152 kg)	Sr	UCF	Atlanta, GA
C	45	Robert Ojeah	6 ft 9 in (2.06 m)	245 lb (111 kg)	Jr	Aiken Technical College	Nigeria
G	52	Steve Rogers	6 ft 1 in (1.85 m)	160 lb (73 kg)	Fr	Brewbaker Tech	Montgomery, AL

Head coach

- Lewis Jackson (Alabama State)

Assistant coach(es)

- Anthony Sewell (Troy)
- Steve Rogers (Alabama State)
- Michael Curry (Alabama State)

Legend

- (C) Team captain
- (S) Suspended
- (I) Ineligible
- (W) Walk-on
- Injured
- Current redshirt

== Schedule and results ==
Date time, TV	Opponent	Result	Record	Site (attendance) city, state
Regular season
11/14/2014*; 7:30 pm	Auburn–Montgomery	W 105–64	0–1	Dunn–Oliver Acadome (N/A); Montgomery, AL
11/16/2013*; 4:00 pm, SECN+	at Arkansas	L 79–97	1–1	Bud Walton Arena (14,318); Fayetteville, AR
11/26/2013*; 7:30 pm	vs. North Dakota; Utah Tournament	L 68–75	1–2	Jon M. Huntsman Center (57); Salt Lake City, UT
11/28/2013*; 6:00 pm	vs. Texas–Pan American; Utah Tournament	W 91–79	2–2	Jon M. Huntsman Center (N/A); Salt Lake City, UT
11/29/2013*; 8:00 pm, P12N	at Utah; Utah Tournament	L 62–93	2–3	Jon M. Huntsman Center (9,921); Salt Lake City, UT
12/06/2014*; 3:00 pm	Jacksonville State	W 80–55	3–3	Dunn–Oliver Acadome (N/A); Montgomery, AL
12/13/2014*; 7:00 pm	at Western Illinois	L 68–78	3–4	Western Hall (1,277); Macomb, IL
12/21/2014*; 1:00 pm	at Evansville	L 63–81	3–5	Ford Center (3,861); Evansville, IN
12/30/2014*; 7:00 pm	Fort Valley State	W 76–65	4–5	Dunn–Oliver Acadome (636); Montgomery, AL
01/03/2015; 5:00 pm	Grambling State	W 71–50	5–5 (1–0)	Dunn–Oliver Acadome (546); Montgomery, AL
01/05/2015; 7:30 pm	Jackson State	W 72–52	6–5 (2–0)	Dunn–Oliver Acadome (763); Montgomery, AL
01/10/2015; 7:30 pm	at Arkansas–Pine Bluff	W 74–71	7–5 (3–0)	K. L. Johnson Complex (1,798); Pine Bluff, AR
01/12/2015; 7:30 pm	at Mississippi Valley State	W 88–76	8–5 (4–0)	Leflore County Civic Center (1,296); Greenwood, MS
01/17/2015; 5:00 pm	at Alabama A&M	W 59–56	9–5 (5–0)	Elmore Gymnasium (3,305); Huntsville, AL
01/24/2015; 5:00 pm	Alcorn State	W 84–60	10–5 (6–0)	Dunn–Oliver Acadome (1,264); Montgomery, AL
01/26/2015; 7:30 pm	Southern	W 63–59 ^{OT}	11–5 (7–0)	Dunn–Oliver Acadome (1,546); Montgomery, AL
01/31/2015; 5:00 pm	at Texas Southern	L 65–80	11–6 (7–1)	H&PE Arena (2,521); Houston, TX
02/02/2015; 7:30 pm	at Prairie View A&M	W 73–71	12–6 (8–1)	William Nicks Building (1,022); Prairie View, TX
2/07/2015; 5:00 pm	Arkansas–Pine Bluff	W 73–55	13–6 (9–1)	Dunn–Oliver Acadome (2,560); Montgomery, AL
2/09/2015; 7:30 pm	Mississippi Valley State	W 65–57	14–6 (10–1)	Dunn–Oliver Acadome (2,256); Montgomery, AL
2/14/2015; 5:00 pm	Alabama A&M	L 71–80	14–7 (10–2)	Dunn–Oliver Acadome (6,453); Montgomery, AL
2/21/2015; 7:30 pm	at Alcorn State	W 71–67	15–7 (11–2)	Davey Whitney Complex (N/A); Lorman, MS
2/23/2015; 7:30 pm, ESPNU	at Southern	W 56–54	16–7 (12–2)	F. G. Clark Center (1,389); Baton Rouge, LA
2/28/2015; 5:00 pm	Texas Southern	L 49–58	16–8 (12–3)	Dunn–Oliver Acadome (3,500); Montgomery, AL
3/02/2015; 7:30 pm	Prairie View A&M	L 65–67	16–9 (12–4)	Dunn–Oliver Acadome (2,456); Montgomery, AL
3/5/2015; 7:30 pm	at Grambling State	W 78–46	17–9 (13–4)	Fredrick C. Hobdy Assembly Center (135); Grambling, LA
3/07/2015; 7:30 pm	at Jackson State	W 62–42	18–9 (14–4)	Williams Assembly Center (839); Jackson, MS
SWAC tournament
03/11/2015; 2:30 pm	vs. Mississippi Valley State; Quarterfinals	W 93–81	19–9	Toyota Center (N/A); Houston, TX
03/13/2015; 2:30 pm	vs. Southern; Semifinals	L 66–68	19–10	Toyota Center (N/A); Houston, TX
*Non-conference game. ^{#}Rankings from AP Poll. (#) Tournament seedings in parentheses. All times are in Central.
