= 2014–15 Grambling State Tigers men's basketball team =

American college basketball season

2014–15 Grambling State Tigers men's basketball
- Conference: Southwestern Athletic Conference
- Record: 2–27 (0–18 SWAC)
- Head coach: Shawn Walker (1st season)
- Assistant coaches: Ray Martin; Kenyon Alston; Kyle Jones; Jaron Moore; Westley F. Gillum JR
- Home arena: Fredrick C. Hobdy Assembly Center

2014–15 SWAC men's basketball standings
	Conf.				Overall
Team	W		L	PCT	W		L	PCT
Texas Southern †	16	–	2	.889	22	–	13	.629
Alabama State*	14	–	4	.778	19	–	10	.655
Southern*	13	–	5	.722	18	–	17	.514
Prairie View A&M	12	–	6	.667	15	–	18	.455
Arkansas–Pine Bluff*	9	–	9	.500	12	–	20	.375
Jackson State	9	–	9	.500	11	–	21	.344
Alabama A&M	8	–	10	.444	9	–	20	.310
Mississippi Valley State	5	–	13	.278	6	–	26	.188
Alcorn State	4	–	14	.222	6	–	26	.188
Grambling State	0	–	18	.000	2	–	27	.069
† 2015 SWAC tournament winner *ineligible for postseason play due to NCAA violations

The 2014–15 Grambling State Tigers men's basketball team represented Grambling State University during the 2014–15 NCAA Division I men's basketball season. The Tigers, led by first year head coach Shawn Walker, played their home games at the Fredrick C. Hobdy Assembly Center and were members of the Southwestern Athletic Conference.

The Tigers finished the season with a record of 2–27, losing all 18 regular-season conference games and their game in the first round of the conference tournament. The team's only two victories on the season were over non-NCAA teams: Lyon College of the NAIA and Selma University of the NCCAA. It was the second season out of three in which the team finished winless in NCAA games, after it went 0–28 in 2012–13.

The team finished the season last out of NCAA Division I's 351 teams in points scored per game, at 52.0. The team drew a total of only 3,454 fans to the Frederick C. Hobdy Assembly Center for its 11 home games, an average of 314 per game.

== Roster ==
Number	Name	Position	Height	Weight	Year	Hometown
0	Remond Brown	Guard	6–4	200	Sophomore	Monroe, Louisiana
1	A'Torri Shine	Guard	6–5	202	Senior	Minden, Louisiana
2	Richard Freeman	Guard/Forward	6–8	205	Sophomore	Indianapolis, Indiana
3	Telvin Marshall	Guard/Forward	6–6		Junior	Shreveport, Louisiana
4	Lonnie McElwain	Forward	6–9		Junior	Indianapolis, Indiana
5	Jefkins Agyeman-Budu	Guard	6–5		Freshman	Staten Island, New York
10	Chase Comier	Guard	5–11	175	Sophomore	Baltimore, Maryland
11	Valerio Altheimer	Guard	6–2	190	Junior	Jonesboro, Louisiana
12	Kyle Williams	Forward	6–9		Freshman	Long Island, New York
21	Robert Wiley	Guard	6–0		Freshman	Grambling, Louisiana
22	Carlton Lowe	Guard	6–3		Sophomore	Alexandria, Louisiana
23	Isiah Patterson	Guard	6–0	160	Sophomore	Vivian, Louisiana
24	Mark Gray	Forward	6–7		Junior	New Iberia, Louisiana

== Schedule ==
Date time, TV	Opponent	Result	Record	Site (attendance) city, state
Regular season
11/14/2014*; 6:00 pm	at George Washington	L 40–92	0–1	Charles E. Smith Center (3,446); Washington, D.C.
11/18/2014*; 7:00 pm	Lyon College	W 55–49	1–1	Fredrick C. Hobdy Assembly Center (200); Grambling, LA
11/20/2014*; 6:00 pm	at Purdue	L 30–82	1–2	Mackey Arena (10,021); West Lafayette, IN
11/24/2014*; 6:00 pm	at Ball State	L 46–88	1–3	John E. Worthen Arena (2,827); Muncie, IN
11/26/2013*; 6:00 pm	at Notre Dame	L 54–81	1–4	Edmund P. Joyce Center (5,485); South Bend, IN
12/03/2014*; 7:00 pm	at Air Force	L 34–59	1–5	Clune Arena (1,017); Colorado Springs, CO
12/06/2014*; 8:00 pm	Selma	W 74–64	2–5	Fredrick C. Hobdy Assembly Center (350); Grambling, LA
12/15/2014*; 9:00 pm, P12N	at Oregon State	L 43–71	2–6	Gill Coliseum (3,553); Corvallis, OR
12/17/2014*; 10:00 pm, P12N	at No. 16 Washington	L 38–86	2–7	Alaska Airlines Arena (5,289); Seattle, WA
12/22/2014*; 7:30 pm	at No. 25 TCU	L 39–80	2–8	Wilkerson-Greines Activity Center (3,765); Fort Worth, TX
01/03/2015; 5:00 pm	at Alabama State	L 50–71	2–9 (0–1)	Dunn–Oliver Acadome (546); Montgomery, AL
01/05/2015; 7:30 pm	at Alabama A&M	L 46–67	2–10 (0–2)	Elmore Gymnasium (1,029); Huntsville, AL
01/10/2015; 5:00 pm	Southern	L 53–59	2–11 (0–3)	Fredrick C. Hobdy Assembly Center (725); Grambling, LA
01/12/2015; 7:30 pm	Alcorn State	L 70–72	2–12 (0–4)	Fredrick C. Hobdy Assembly Center (N/A); Grambling, LA
01/17/2015; 7:30 pm	at Texas Southern	L 51–60	2–13 (0–5)	Health and Physical Education Arena (3,452); Houston, TX
01/19/2015; 7:30 pm	at Prairie View A&M	L 60–74	2–14 (0–6)	William J. Nicks Building (1,129); Prairie View, TX
01/24/2015; 5:00 pm	Jackson State	L 63–74	2–15 (0–7)	Fredrick C. Hobdy Assembly Center (650); Grambling, LA
01/31/2015; 5:00 pm	Arkansas–Pine Bluff	L 53–65	2–16 (0–8)	Fredrick C. Hobdy Assembly Center (500); Grambling, LA
02/02/2015; 7:30 pm	Mississippi Valley State	L 65–68	2–17 (0–9)	Fredrick C. Hobdy Assembly Center (N/A); Grambling, LA
02/07/2015; 5:30 pm	at Southern	L 50–58	2–18 (0–10)	F. G. Clark Center (2,859); Baton Rouge, LA
02/09/2015; 7:30 pm	at Alcorn State	L 77–91	2–19 (0–11)	Davey Whitney Complex (N/A); Lorman, MS
02/14/2015; 5:00 pm	Texas Southern	L 58–81	2–20 (0–12)	Fredrick C. Hobdy Assembly Center (150); Grambling, LA
02/16/2015; 7:30 pm	Prairie View A&M	L 44–95	2–21 (0–13)	Fredrick C. Hobdy Assembly Center (139); Grambling, LA
02/21/2015; 5:00 pm	at Jackson State	L 33–72	2–22 (0–14)	Williams Assembly Center (509); Jackson, MS
02/28/2015; 7:30 pm	at Arkansas-Pine Bluff	L 57–66	2–23 (0–15)	K. L. Johnson Complex (3,406); Pine Bluff, AR
03/02/2015; 7:30 pm	at Mississippi Valley State	L 62–66	2–24 (0–16)	Leflore County Civic Center (N/A); Greenwood, MS
03/05/2015; 5:00 pm	Alabama State	L 46–78	2–25 (0–17)	Fredrick C. Hobdy Assembly Center (135); Grambling, LA
03/07/2015; 5:00 pm	Alabama A&M	L 66–70	2–26 (0–18)	Fredrick C. Hobdy Assembly Center (255); Grambling, LA
SWAC tournament
03/10/2015; 9:30 pm	vs. Alcorn State; First Round	L 52–66	2–27	Toyota Center (N/A); Houston, TX
*Non-conference game. ^{#}Rankings from AP Poll. (#) Tournament seedings in parentheses. All times are in Central Time.
