= 2014–15 UTEP Miners men's basketball team =

American college basketball season

2014–15 UTEP Miners men's basketball

Sun Bowl Invitational champions

NIT, First round
- Conference: Conference USA
- Record: 22–11 (13–5 C-USA)
- Head coach: Tim Floyd (5th season)
- Assistant coaches: Phil Johnson; Bob Cantu; Ken DeWeese
- Home arena: Don Haskins Center

2014–15 Conference USA men's basketball standings
| | Conf. | | | | Overall |
| Team | W | | L | PCT | W | | L | PCT |
|---|---|---|---|---|---|---|---|---|
| Louisiana Tech | 15 | – | 3 | .833 | 27 | – | 9 | .750 |
| Old Dominion | 13 | – | 5 | .722 | 27 | – | 8 | .771 |
| UTEP | 13 | – | 5 | .722 | 22 | – | 11 | .667 |
| WKU | 12 | – | 6 | .667 | 20 | – | 12 | .625 |
| UAB † | 12 | – | 6 | .667 | 20 | – | 16 | .556 |
| Middle Tennessee | 9 | – | 9 | .500 | 19 | – | 17 | .528 |
| FIU | 8 | – | 10 | .444 | 16 | – | 17 | .485 |
| UTSA | 8 | – | 10 | .444 | 14 | – | 16 | .467 |
| North Texas | 8 | – | 10 | .444 | 14 | – | 17 | .452 |
| Rice | 8 | – | 10 | .444 | 12 | – | 20 | .375 |
| Charlotte | 7 | – | 11 | .389 | 14 | – | 18 | .438 |
| Marshall | 7 | – | 11 | .389 | 11 | – | 21 | .344 |
| Southern Miss* | 4 | – | 14 | .222 | 9 | – | 20 | .310 |
| Florida Atlantic | 2 | – | 16 | .111 | 9 | – | 20 | .310 |
† 2015 C-USA Tournament winner *Ineligible for postseason play due to self-imposed postseason ban

The 2014–15 UTEP Miners basketball team represented the University of Texas at El Paso during the 2014–15 NCAA Division I men's basketball season. The Miners, led by fifth year head coach Tim Floyd, played their home games at the Don Haskins Center and were members of Conference USA. They finished the season 22–11, 13–5 in C-USA play to finish in a tie for the second place. They advanced to the semifinals of the C-USA tournament where they lost to Middle Tennessee. They were invited to the National Invitation Tournament where they lost in the first round to Murray State. UTEP averaged 8,458 fans per game, ranking 53rd nationally.

== Previous season ==
The Miners finished the season 23–11, 12–4 in C-USA play to finish in fifth place. They advanced to the quarterfinals of the C-USA tournament where they lost to Southern Miss. They were invited to the College Basketball Invitational where they lost in the first round to Fresno State.

== Departures ==
| Name | Number | Pos. | Height | Weight | Year | Hometown | Notes |
|---|---|---|---|---|---|---|---|
| Jalen Ragland | 2 | G/F | 6'7" | 175 | Junior | Chillicothe, OH | Dismissed from the team |
| Aaron Jones | 2 | G | 5'10" | 175 | Freshman | El Paso, TX | Transferred to pursue football |
| McKenzie Moore | 13 | G | 6'6" | 200 | Junior | Pleasant Hill, CA | Dismissed from the team |
| Josh Brown | 20 | G | 5'11" | 185 | Freshman | Los Angeles, CA | Transferred |
| John Bohannon | 21 | C | 6'10" | 211 | Senior | Lancaster, TX | Graduated |
| Alvin Jones | 24 | G | 5'10" | 180 | Freshman | El Paso, TX | Transferred to pursue football |
| Tyler Tafoya | 35 | G | 6'3" | 195 | Senior | El Paso, TX | Graduated |

=== Incoming transfers ===
| Name | Number | Pos. | Height | Weight | Year | Hometown | Previous School |
|---|---|---|---|---|---|---|---|
| Earvin Morris, Jr. | 20 | G | 6'2" | 175 | Junior | Memphis, TN | Junior college transfer from Tallahassee Community College. |

== Class of 2014 recruits ==
College recruiting information
| Name | Hometown | School | Height | Weight | Commit date |
|---|---|---|---|---|---|
| Shaquile Carr; PG | Las Vegas, NV | Canyon Springs High School | 6 ft 1 in (1.85 m) | 155 lb (70 kg) | Jan 24, 2014 |
| Shaquile Carr; PG | Recruit ratings: Scout: Rivals: (73) | | | | |
| Omega Harris; SG | Bethany, OK | Putnam City West High School | 6 ft 2 in (1.88 m) | 175 lb (79 kg) | Sep 28, 2013 |
| Omega Harris; SG | Recruit ratings: Scout: Rivals: (71) | | | | |
| Chris Sandifer; SF | Gardena, CA | Taft High School | 6 ft 5 in (1.96 m) | 180 lb (82 kg) | Oct 30, 2013 |
| Chris Sandifer; SF | Recruit ratings: Scout: Rivals: (70) | | | | |
| MarQywell Jackson; SF | Detroit, MI | East English Village Prep Academy | 6 ft 5 in (1.96 m) | 180 lb (82 kg) | Mar 26, 2014 |
| MarQywell Jackson; SF | Recruit ratings: Scout: Rivals: (62) | | | | |
| Lew Stallworth; SG | Newhall, CA | William S. Hart High School | 6 ft 1 in (1.85 m) | 175 lb (79 kg) | Jan 6, 2014 |
| Lew Stallworth; SG | Recruit ratings: Scout: Rivals: (60) | | | | |
| Trey Touchet; SG | Lafayette, LA | Saint Thomas More High School | 6 ft 2 in (1.88 m) | 175 lb (79 kg) | Sep 17, 2013 |
| Trey Touchet; SG | Recruit ratings: Scout: Rivals: (NR) | | | | |
| Terry Winn; PF | Monroe, LA | Westwind Prep Academy | 6 ft 7 in (2.01 m) | 233 lb (106 kg) | Mar 5, 2014 |
| Terry Winn; PF | Recruit ratings: Scout: Rivals: (NR) | | | | |
Overall recruit ranking:
Note: In many cases, Scout, Rivals, 247Sports, On3, and ESPN may conflict in their listings of height and weight.; In these cases, the average was taken. ESPN grades are on a 100-point scale.; Sources: "2014 Team Ranking". Rivals.

== Roster ==
2014–15 UTEP Miners men's basketball team
Players
Coaches

| Pos. | # | Name | Height | Weight | Year | Previous school | Hometown |
|---|---|---|---|---|---|---|---|
| G | 2 | Omega Harris | 6 ft 2 in (1.88 m) | 175 lb (79 kg) | Fr | Putnam City West HS | Bethany, OK |
| G | 3 | Victor Mbachu | 6 ft 1 in (1.85 m) | 165 lb (75 kg) | Sr | Angelina College | Houston, TX |
| G/F | 4 | Julian Washburn | 6 ft 8 in (2.03 m) | 210 lb (95 kg) | Sr | Duncanville HS | Duncanville, TX |
| G | 5 | C. J. Cooper | 6 ft 0 in (1.83 m) | 180 lb (82 kg) | Sr | Lutheran HS | Chino, CA |
| G/F | 11 | Jake Flaggert | 6 ft 7 in (2.01 m) | 195 lb (88 kg) | So | Lovejoy HS | Lucas, TX |
| F | 12 | Terry Winn | 6 ft 7 in (2.01 m) | 235 lb (107 kg) | Fr | Westwind Prep Acad | Monroe, LA |
| G | 13 | Lew Stallworth | 6 ft 1 in (1.85 m) | 175 lb (79 kg) | Fr | William S. Hart HS | Santa Clarita, CA |
| G | 15 | Tevin Caldwell | 6 ft 3 in (1.91 m) | 180 lb (82 kg) | Sr | Cochise College | El Paso, TX |
| G | 20 | Earvin Morris | 6 ft 4 in (1.93 m) | 175 lb (79 kg) | Jr | Tallahassee CC | Memphis, TN |
| G | 21 | Trey Touchet | 6 ft 2 in (1.88 m) | 175 lb (79 kg) | Fr | Saint Thomas More HS | Lafayette, IN |
| C | 23 | Hooper Vint | 6 ft 11 in (2.11 m) | 235 lb (107 kg) | Jr | Van Buren HS | Van Buren, AR |
| F | 31 | Cedrick Lang | 6 ft 10 in (2.08 m) | 255 lb (116 kg) | Sr | O'Gorman HS | Sioux Falls, SD |
| F | 32 | Vince Hunter | 6 ft 8 in (2.03 m) | 200 lb (91 kg) | So | Consortium College Prep | Detroit, MI |
| G | 33 | Darnell Vandivort | 6 ft 1 in (1.85 m) | 145 lb (66 kg) | So | Franklin HS | El Paso, TX |
| C | 41 | Matt Willms | 7 ft 1 in (2.16 m) | 220 lb (100 kg) | So | Findlay Prep | Leamington, ON |

Head coach

- Tim Floyd (Louisiana Tech)

Assistant coach(es)

- Phil Johnson (East Central)
- Bob Cantu (Chapman)
- Ken DeWeese (Mary Hardin–Baylor)

Legend

- (C) Team captain
- (S) Suspended
- (I) Ineligible
- (W) Walk-on
- Injured
- Current redshirt

Roster

== Schedule ==
| Date time, TV | Rank^{#} | Opponent^{#} | Result | Record | Site (attendance) city, state |
Exhibition
| 11/09/2014*; 3:00 pm | | Southeastern Oklahoma | W 105–58 | – | Don Haskins Center (5,917); El Paso, TX |
| 12/30/2014*; 7:00 pm | | Sul Ross State | W 84–72 | – | Don Haskins Center (N/A); El Paso, TX |
Regular season
| 11/14/2014*; 8:00 pm | | Washington State | W 65–52 | 1–0 | Don Haskins Center (10,419); El Paso, TX |
| 11/22/2014*; 7:00 pm | | New Mexico State; The Battle of I-10 | W 77–76 | 2–0 | Don Haskins Center (11,127); El Paso, TX |
| 11/27/2014*; 12:00 pm, ESPNU | | vs. Princeton; Wooden Legacy quarterfinals | W 62–56 | 3–0 | Titan Gym (N/A); Fullerton, CA |
| 11/28/2014*; 1:30 pm, ESPN2 | | vs. Xavier; Wooden Legacy semifinals | W 77–73 | 4–0 | Titan Gym (N/A); Fullerton, CA |
| 11/30/2014*; 8:00 pm, ESPN2 | | vs. Washington; Wooden Legacy championship | L 65–68 | 4–1 | Honda Center (2,191); Anaheim, CA |
| 12/03/2014*; 7:00 pm | | at Colorado State | L 62–65 | 4–2 | Moby Arena (3,480); Fort Collins, CO |
| 12/06/2014*; 7:00 pm, ASN | | at New Mexico State; The Battle of I-10 | L 64–71 | 4–3 | Pan American Center (8,789); Las Cruces, NM |
| 12/08/2014*; 7:00 pm | | Incarnate Word | W 81–65 | 5–3 | Don Haskins Center (6,570); El Paso, TX |
| 12/16/2014*; 7:00 pm | | Southeastern Louisiana | W 80–62 | 6–3 | Don Haskins Center (6,811); El Paso, TX |
| 12/19/2014*; 9:00 pm, FS1 | | No. 3 Arizona | L 55–60 | 6–4 | Don Haskins Center (12,000); El Paso, TX |
| 12/21/2014*; 7:00 pm | | Alcorn State; Sun Bowl Invitational | W 78–45 | 7–4 | Don Haskins Center (5,790); El Paso, TX |
| 12/22/2014*; 7:00 pm | | Kent State; Sun Bowl Invitational | W 78–75 | 8–4 | Don Haskins Center (6,290); El Paso, TX |
| 01/02/2015; 6:00 pm, ASN | | at North Texas | W 85–71 | 9–4 (1–0) | The Super Pit (2,785); Denton, TX |
| 01/04/2015; 1:30 pm, ASN | | at Rice | W 66–57 | 10–4 (2–0) | Tudor Fieldhouse (1,220); Houston, TX |
| 01/08/2015; 7:00 pm | | Louisiana Tech | L 45–58 | 10–5 (2–1) | Don Haskins Center (8,653); El Paso, TX |
| 01/10/2015; 7:00 pm | | Southern Miss | W 74–40 | 11–5 (3–1) | Don Haskins Center (8,022); El Paso, TX |
| 01/17/2015; 1:00 pm, ASN | | at UTSA | W 73–55 | 12–5 (4–1) | Convocation Center (1,737); San Antonio, TX |
| 01/22/2015; 7:00 pm, FSN | | at WKU | L 66–71 ^{OT} | 12–6 (4–2) | E. A. Diddle Arena (6,414); Bowling Green, KY |
| 01/24/2015; 1:00 pm, ASN | | at Marshall | L 71–78 | 12–7 (4–3) | Cam Henderson Center (5,302); Huntington, WV |
| 01/29/2015; 7:00 pm, CBSSN | | UAB | W 71–69 | 13–7 (5–3) | Don Haskins Center (7,455); El Paso, TX |
| 01/31/2015; 7:00 pm | | Middle Tennessee | W 83–70 | 14–7 (6–3) | Don Haskins Center (8,281); El Paso, TX |
| 02/05/2015; 6:00 pm, ASN | | at Florida Atlantic | W 63–56 | 15–7 (7–3) | FAU Arena (1,566); Boca Raton, FL |
| 02/07/2015; 3:30 pm, ASN | | at FIU | W 67–64 | 16–7 (8–3) | FIU Arena (1,312); Miami, FL |
| 02/12/2015; 7:00 pm | | Charlotte | W 73–68 | 17–7 (9–3) | Don Haskins Center (7,533); El Paso, TX |
| 02/14/2015; 7:00 pm | | Old Dominion | W 62–47 | 18–7 (10–3) | Don Haskins Center (9,262); El Paso, TX |
| 02/21/2015; 7:00 pm | | UTSA | W 69–62 | 19–7 (11–3) | Don Haskins Center (10,884); El Paso, TX |
| 02/26/2015; 6:00 pm, FS1 | | at Louisiana Tech | L 60–77 | 19–8 (11–4) | Thomas Assembly Center (5,126); Ruston, LA |
| 02/28/2015; 6:00 pm | | at Southern Miss | L 60–63 | 19–9 (11–5) | Reed Green Coliseum (4,778); Hattiesburg, MS |
| 03/05/2015; 7:00 pm | | North Texas | W 83–60 | 20–9 (12–5) | Don Haskins Center (7,651); El Paso, TX |
| 03/07/2015; 2:00 pm | | Rice | W 68–65 | 21–9 (13–5) | Don Haskins Center (8,574); El Paso, TX |
Conference USA tournament
| 03/12/2015; 12:00 pm, ASN | | vs. FIU; Quarterfinals | W 83–71 | 22–9 | Birmingham–Jefferson Convention Complex (4,339); Birmingham, AL |
| 03/13/2015; 3:00 pm, CBSSN | | vs. Middle Tennessee; Semifinals | L 50–53 | 22–10 | Birmingham–Jefferson Convention Complex (6,429); Birmingham, AL |
NIT
| 03/17/2015*; 7:00 pm, ESPN2 | No. (6) | at (3) Murray State; First round | L 66–81 | 22–11 | CFSB Center (3,376); Murray, KY |
*Non-conference game. ^{#}Rankings from AP Poll. (#) Tournament seedings in parentheses. All times are in Mountain Time. (#) during NIT is seed within region.

== See also ==
- 2014–15 UTEP Lady Miners basketball team
