= 2014–15 Alabama A&M Bulldogs basketball team =

American college basketball season

2014–15 Alabama A&M Bulldogs men's basketball
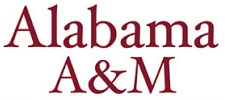
- Conference: Southwestern Athletic Conference
- Record: 9–20 (8–10 SWAC)
- Head coach: Willie Hayes (4th season)
- Assistant coaches: Dexter Holt; James Wright
- Home arena: Elmore Gymnasium

2014–15 SWAC men's basketball standings
	Conf.				Overall
Team	W		L	PCT	W		L	PCT
Texas Southern †	16	–	2	.889	22	–	13	.629
Alabama State*	14	–	4	.778	19	–	10	.655
Southern*	13	–	5	.722	18	–	17	.514
Prairie View A&M	12	–	6	.667	15	–	18	.455
Arkansas–Pine Bluff*	9	–	9	.500	12	–	20	.375
Jackson State	9	–	9	.500	11	–	21	.344
Alabama A&M	8	–	10	.444	9	–	20	.310
Mississippi Valley State	5	–	13	.278	6	–	26	.188
Alcorn State	4	–	14	.222	6	–	26	.188
Grambling State	0	–	18	.000	2	–	27	.069
† 2015 SWAC tournament winner *ineligible for postseason play due to NCAA violations

The 2014–15 Alabama A&M Bulldogs basketball team represented Alabama Agricultural and Mechanical University during the 2014–15 NCAA Division I men's basketball season. The Bulldogs, led by fourth year head coach Willie Hayes, played their home games at Elmore Gymnasium and were members of the Southwestern Athletic Conference. They finished the season 9–20, 8–10 in SWAC play to finish in seventh place. They lost in the quarterfinals of the SWAC tournament to Southern.

== Roster ==
Number	Name	Position	Height	Weight	Year	Hometown
00	Justan Banks	Center	7–1	215	Junior	Oxford, Alabama
4	Justin Colvin	Guard	6–3	190	Sophomore	Lithonia, Georgia
10	Jeremy Crutcher	Guard	5–8	160	Senior	Hazel Green, Alabama
11	Arthur Capers	Forward	6–5	185	Senior	Monroe, Georgia
12	Green Hill	Guard	5–10	175	Senior	Aransas Pass, Texas
20	Jose Long	Guard/Forward	6–5	210	Junior	Madison, Alabama
22	Tyler Davis	Guard	6–2	180	Sophomore	Madison, Alabama
24	Matthew Cotton	Guard	5–10	185	Freshman	Atlanta, Georgia
30	Demarquelle Tabb	Guard/Forward	6–5	210	Senior	Greensboro, Alabama
33	Baryn Houston	Guard/Forward	6–7	190	Sopohomore	Birmingham, Alabama
35	Nicholas West	Forward	6–10	190	Sophomore	LaGrange, Georgia
40	Brandon Ellis	Guard	6–3	200	Senior	Loxley, Alabama
41	Rakiya Battle	Guard	5–10	180	Freshman	Harvest, Alabama
42	Isaiah Edwards	Guard	6–2	200	Freshman	New Market, Alabama
45	Xavier Williams	Forward	6–8	205	Freshman	Birmingham, Alabama
55	Jerome Hunter	Forward/Center	6–8	230	Senior	Buffalo, New York

== Schedule ==
Date time, TV	Opponent	Result	Record	Site (attendance) city, state
Regular season
11/14/2014*; 7:00 pm	at Dayton	L 52–76	0–1	UD Arena (12,732); Dayton, OH
11/18/2014*; 6:00 pm, ESPN3	at Georgia Tech	L 46–66	0–2	Hank McCamish Pavilion (4,722); Atlanta, GA
11/22/2014*; 7:00 pm	Oakwood	W 81–61	1–2	Elmore Gymnasium (1,455); Huntsville, AL
11/25/2014*; 7:00 pm	Jacksonville State	L 61–67	1–3	Elmore Gymnasium (352); Huntsville, AL
11/29/2014*; 6:00 pm	at Southeast Missouri State	L 51–85	1–4	Show Me Center (1,103); Cape Girardeau, MO
12/06/2014*; 4:00 pm	at Bowling Green	L 47–64	1–5	Stroh Center (1,399); Bowling Green, OH
12/14/2014*; 4:00 pm, ESPN3	at Virginia Tech	L 55–65	1–6	Cassell Coliseum (3,559); Blacksburg, VA
12/19/2014*; 8:00 pm, FS1	at Marquette	L 49–83	1–7	BMO Harris Bradley Center (3,080); Milwaukee, WI
12/22/2014*; 7:00 pm	at Western Michigan	L 62–71	1–8	University Arena (3,108); Kalamazoo, MI
12/30/2014*; 7:00 pm	at Murray State	L 39–76	1–9	CFSB Center (3,039); Murray, KY
1/03/2015; 6:00 pm	Jackson State	L 67–70	1–10 (0–1)	Elmore Gymnasium (526); Huntsville, AL
1/05/2015; 7:30 pm	Grambling State	W 67–46	2–10 (1–1)	Elmore Gymnasium (1,029); Huntsville, AL
1/10/2015; 5:00 pm	at Mississippi Valley State	W 86–73	3–10 (2–1)	Leflore County Civic Center (1,098); Greenwood, MS
1/12/2015; 7:30 pm	at Arkansas–Pine Bluff	W 51–49	4–10 (3–1)	K. L. Johnson Complex (1,589); Pine Bluff, AR
1/17/2015; 6:00 pm	Alabama State	L 56–59	4–11 (3–2)	Elmore Gymnasium (3,305); Huntsville, AL
1/24/2015; 6:30 pm	Southern	L 58–65	4–12 (3–3)	Elmore Gymnasium (1,327); Huntsville, AL
1/26/2015; 7:30 pm	Alcorn State	W 78–66	5–12 (4–3)	Elmore Gymnasium (937); Huntsville, AL
1/31/2015; 5:00 pm	at Prairie View A&M	L 63–89	5–13 (4–4)	William J. Nicks Building (782); Prairie View, TX
2/02/2015; 7:30 pm	at Texas Southern	L 65–69 ^{OT}	5–14 (4–5)	Health and Physical Education Arena (1,875); Houston, TX
2/07/2015; 6:00 pm	Mississippi Valley State	W 74–68	6–14 (5–5)	Elmore Gymnasium (719); Huntsville, AL
2/09/2015; 7:30 pm	Arkansas Pine Bluff	L 42–53	6–15 (5–6)	Elmore Gymnasium (1,253); Huntsville, AL
2/14/2015; 5:00 pm	at Alabama State	W 80–71	7–15 (6–6)	Dunn–Oliver Acadome (6,453); Montgomery, AL
2/21/2015; 5:30 pm	at Southern	L 63–72	7–16 (6–7)	F. G. Clark Center (1,633); Baton Rouge, LA
2/23/2015; 7:30 pm	at Alcorn State	W 73–69	8–16 (7–7)	Davey Whitney Complex (N/A); Lorman, MS
2/28/2015; 6:00 pm	Prairie View A&M	L 72–75	8–17 (7–8)	Elmore Gymnasium (1,487); Huntsville, AL
3/02/2015; 7:30 pm	Texas Southern	L 75–77	8–18 (7–9)	Elmore Gymnasium (1,482); Huntsville, AL
3/05/2015; 7:30 pm	at Jackson State	L 54–72	8–19 (7–10)	Williams Assembly Center (537); Jackson, MS
3/07/2015; 5:00 pm	at Grambling State	W 70–66	9–19 (8–10)	Fredrick C. Hobdy Assembly Center (255); Grambling, LA
SWAC tournament
3/12/2015; 3:30 pm	vs. Southern	L 60–64	9–20	Toyota Center (N/A); Houston, TX
*Non-conference game. ^{#}Rankings from AP Poll. (#) Tournament seedings in parentheses. All times are in Central Time.
