= 2014–15 Texas Southern Tigers basketball team =

American college basketball season

2014–15 Texas Southern Tigers men's basketball
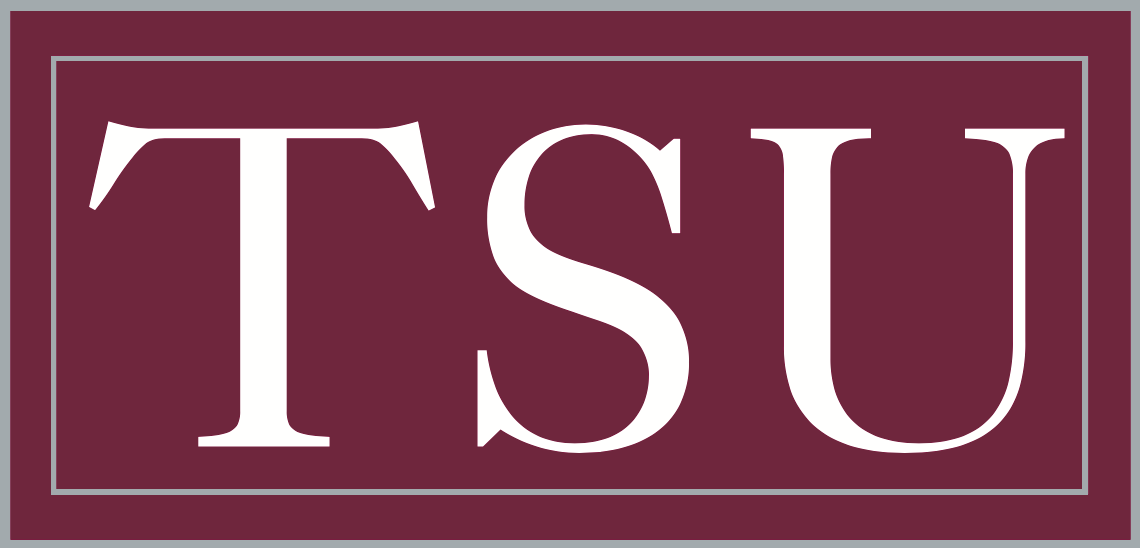

National champions (Black College Sports Page) SWAC Regular Season Champions SWAC tournament champions

NCAA tournament, round of 64
- Conference: Southwestern Athletic Conference
- Record: 22–13 (16–2 SWAC)
- Head coach: Mike Davis (3rd season)
- Assistant coaches: Donald Marsh; Michael Davis, Jr.; J. Keith LeGree
- Home arena: Health and Physical Education Arena

2014–15 SWAC men's basketball standings
| | Conf. | | | | Overall |
| Team | W | | L | PCT | W | | L | PCT |
|---|---|---|---|---|---|---|---|---|
| Texas Southern † | 16 | – | 2 | .889 | 22 | – | 13 | .629 |
| Alabama State* | 14 | – | 4 | .778 | 19 | – | 10 | .655 |
| Southern* | 13 | – | 5 | .722 | 18 | – | 17 | .514 |
| Prairie View A&M | 12 | – | 6 | .667 | 15 | – | 18 | .455 |
| Arkansas–Pine Bluff* | 9 | – | 9 | .500 | 12 | – | 20 | .375 |
| Jackson State | 9 | – | 9 | .500 | 11 | – | 21 | .344 |
| Alabama A&M | 8 | – | 10 | .444 | 9 | – | 20 | .310 |
| Mississippi Valley State | 5 | – | 13 | .278 | 6 | – | 26 | .188 |
| Alcorn State | 4 | – | 14 | .222 | 6 | – | 26 | .188 |
| Grambling State | 0 | – | 18 | .000 | 2 | – | 27 | .069 |
† 2015 SWAC tournament winner *ineligible for postseason play due to NCAA violations

The 2014–15 Texas Southern Tigers basketball team represented Texas Southern University during the 2014–15 NCAA Division I men's basketball season. The Tigers, led by third-year head coach Mike Davis, played their home games at the Health and Physical Education Arena and were members of the Southwestern Athletic Conference. They finished the season 22–13, 16–2 in SWAC play to be SWAC regular season champions. They defeated Alcorn State, Prairie View A&M, and Southern to become champions of the SWAC tournament and receive the conference's automatic bid to the NCAA tournament. As a 15 seed, they lost in the second round to Arizona.

== Previous season ==
The Tigers finished the 2013–14 season 19–5, 12–6 in SWAC play to finish in second place in conference. They defeated Grambling State, Alabama State, and Prairie View A&M to win the SWAC tournament and earn the conference's automatic bid to the NCAA tournament. The Tigers received a 16 seed in the Tournament and lost in the First Four to Cal Poly.

== Roster ==
| Number | Name | Position | Height | Weight | Year | Hometown |
|---|---|---|---|---|---|---|
| 1 | Deverell Biggs | Guard | 6–1 | 185 | Senior | Omaha, Nebraska |
| 2 | Chris Thomas | Forward | 6–5 | 190 | Junior | Denver, Colorado |
| 3 | Madarious Gibbs | Guard | 6–1 | 190 | Senior | Newnan, Georgia |
| 4 | Jose Rodriguez | Forward | 6–7 | 215 | Senior | The Bronx, New York |
| 5 | Tyree Bynum | Guard | 5–9 | 165 | Sophomore | Philadelphia, Pennsylvania |
| 11 | Malcolm Riley | Forward | 6–5 | 200 | Junior | Newport News, Virginia |
| 12 | Tonnie Collier | Forward | 6–8 | 210 | Junior | Milwaukee, Wisconsin |
| 14 | Eric Washington | Forward | 6–4 | 210 | Senior | Birmingham, Alabama |
| 15 | David Blanks | Guard | 6–3 | 180 | Junior | Barberton, Ohio |
| 20 | Giovanni Mack | Guard | 5–9 | 175 | Freshman | Charlotte, North Carolina |
| 23 | Jason Carter | Forward | 6–9 | 240 | Senior | Houston, Texas |
| 24 | Nevin Johnson | Guard | 6–3 | 190 | Junior | Spring, Texas |
| 33 | Nick Shepherd | Forward | 6–9 | 220 | Graduate student | Missouri City, Texas |
| 34 | Christian McCoggle | Center | 6–8 | 220 | Sophomore | Dallas, Texas |

== Schedule ==
| Date time, TV | Rank^{#} | Opponent^{#} | Result | Record | Site (attendance) city, state |
Regular season
| 11/14/2014*; 10:00 am | | at Eastern Washington; Hoosiers Showcase | L 62–86 | 0–1 | Reese Court (1,623); Cheney, WA |
| 11/17/2014*; 5:00 pm, BTN | | at Indiana; Hoosiers Showcase | L 64–83 | 0–2 | Assembly Hall (17,243); Bloomington, IN |
| 11/20/2014*; 6:00 pm, FSN | | at Tennessee | L 58–70 | 0–3 | Thompson–Boling Arena (13,236); Knoxville, TN |
| 11/22/2014*; 5:00 pm | | at Norfolk State | L 66–76 | 0–4 | Joseph G. Echols Memorial Hall (1,555); Norfolk, VA |
| 11/26/2014*; 7:00 pm, ESPN3 | | at SMU; Hoosiers Classic | L 59–72 | 0–5 | Moody Coliseum (6,852); University Park, TX |
| 11/28/2014*; 3:00 pm | | Lamar; Hoosiers Classic | W 71–59 | 1–5 | Health and Physical Education Arena (N/A); Houston, TX |
| 12/01/2014*; 8:00 pm, ESPNU | | at Baylor | L 49–75 | 1–6 | Ferrell Center (4,286); Waco, TX |
| 12/12/2014*; 6:00 pm, SECN | | at Florida | L 50–75 | 1–7 | O'Connell Center (9,212); Gainesville, FL |
| 12/15/2014*; 6:00 pm, RTSW | | at No. 8 Gonzaga | L 54–94 | 1–8 | McCarthey Athletic Center (6,000); Spokane, WA |
| 12/20/2014*; 4:00 pm, ESPNU | | at No. 25 Michigan State | W 71–64 ^{OT} | 2–8 | Breslin Center (14,797); East Lansing, MI |
| 12/23/2014*; 7:00 pm, SECN+ | | at Auburn | L 60–61 | 2–9 | Auburn Arena (7,323); Auburn, AL |
| 12/28/2014*; 2:00 pm, FSMW | | at Kansas State | W 58–56 | 3–9 | Bramlage Coliseum (12,528); Manhattan, KS |
| 12/30/2014*; 7:00 pm | | at New Mexico State | L 52–54 | 3–10 | Pan American Center (4,981); Las Cruces, NM |
| 01/03/2015; 3:00 pm | | at Alcorn State | W 72–55 | 4–10 (1–0) | Davey Whitney Complex (343); Lorman, MS |
| 01/05/2015; 8:00 pm, ESPNU | | at Southern | W 59–58 | 5–10 (2–0) | F.G. Clark Center (656); Baton Rouge, LA |
| 01/10/2015; 8:00 pm | | at Prairie View A&M | W 81–77 | 6–10 (3–0) | William Nicks Building (931); Prairie View, TX |
| 01/17/2015; 7:30 pm | | Grambling State | W 60–51 | 7–10 (4–0) | Health and Physical Education Arena (3,452); Houston, TX |
| 01/19/2015; 7:30 pm | | Jackson State | W 67–54 | 8–10 (5–0) | Health and Physical Education Arena (1,524); Houston, TX |
| 01/24/2015; 7:30 pm | | at Arkansas–Pine Bluff | L 62–66 | 8–11 (5–1) | K. L. Johnson Complex (2,002); Pine Bluff, AR |
| 01/26/2015; 7:30 pm | | at Mississippi Valley State | W 85–84 ^{3OT} | 9–11 (6–1) | Leflore County Civic Center (452); Greenwood, MS |
| 01/31/2015; 7:30 pm | | Alabama State | W 80–65 | 10–11 (7–1) | Health and Physical Education Arena (2,521); Houston, TX |
| 02/02/2015; 7:30 pm, ESPNU | | Alabama A&M | W 68–65 ^{OT} | 11–11 (8–1) | Health and Physical Education Arena (1,875); Houston, TX |
| 02/07/2015; 7:30 pm | | Prairie View A&M | L 55–58 | 11–12 (8–2) | Health and Physical Education Arena (7,586); Houston, TX |
| 02/14/2015; 7:30 pm | | at Grambling State | W 81–58 | 12–12 (9–2) | Fredrick C. Hobdy Assembly Center (150); Grambling, LA |
| 02/16/2015; 7:30 pm | | at Jackson State | W 71–70 ^{OT} | 13–12 (10–2) | Williams Assembly Center (399); Jackson, MS |
| 02/21/2015; 7:30 pm | | Arkansas Pine–Bluff | W 56–50 | 14–12 (11–2) | Health and Physical Education Arena (1,024); Houston, TX |
| 02/23/2015; 7:30 pm | | Mississippi Valley State | W 83–73 | 15–12 (12–2) | Health and Physical Education Arena (1,021); Houston, TX |
| 02/28/2015; 5:00 pm | | at Alabama State | W 58–49 | 16–12 (13–2) | Dunn–Oliver Acadome (3,500); Montgomery, AL |
| 03/02/2015; 7:30 pm | | at Alabama A&M | W 77–75 | 17–12 (14–2) | Elmore Gymnasium (1,482); Huntsville, AL |
| 03/05/2015; 7:30 pm | | Alcorn State | W 94–73 | 18–12 (15–2) | Health and Physical Education Arena (1,024); Houston, TX |
| 03/07/2015; 7:30 pm | | Southern | W 88–78 | 19–12 (16–2) | Health and Physical Education Arena (4,572); Houston, TX |
SWAC tournament
| 03/11/2015; 8:30 pm | | vs. Alcorn State; Quarterfinals | W 95–74 | 20–12 | Toyota Center (3,905); Houston, TX |
| 03/13/2015; 5:00 pm, ESPN3 | | vs. Prairie View A&M; Semifinals | W 90–77 | 21–12 | Toyota Center (N/A); Houston, TX |
| 03/14/2015; 5:00 pm, ESPNU | | vs. Southern; Championship game | W 62–58 | 22–12 | Toyota Center (N/A); Houston, TX |
NCAA tournament
| 03/19/2015*; 1:10 pm, TNT | (15 W) | vs. (2 W) No. 5 Arizona; Second Round | L 72–93 | 22–13 | Moda Center (13,616); Portland, OR |
*Non-conference game. ^{#}Rankings from AP Poll. (#) Tournament seedings in parentheses. All times are in Central Time. (#) during NCAA Tournament is seed with Region W=West.
