= 2014–15 Jackson State Tigers basketball team =

American college basketball season

2014–15 Jackson State Tigers men's basketball
- Conference: Southwestern Athletic Conference
- Record: 11–21 (9–9 SWAC)
- Head coach: Wayne Brent (2nd season)
- Assistant coaches: Hennssy Auriantal; Cason Burk; Phillip Shumpert; Nicholas Tate
- Home arena: Williams Assembly Center

2014–15 SWAC men's basketball standings
	Conf.				Overall
Team	W		L	PCT	W		L	PCT
Texas Southern †	16	–	2	.889	22	–	13	.629
Alabama State*	14	–	4	.778	19	–	10	.655
Southern*	13	–	5	.722	18	–	17	.514
Prairie View A&M	12	–	6	.667	15	–	18	.455
Arkansas–Pine Bluff*	9	–	9	.500	12	–	20	.375
Jackson State	9	–	9	.500	11	–	21	.344
Alabama A&M	8	–	10	.444	9	–	20	.310
Mississippi Valley State	5	–	13	.278	6	–	26	.188
Alcorn State	4	–	14	.222	6	–	26	.188
Grambling State	0	–	18	.000	2	–	27	.069
† 2015 SWAC tournament winner *ineligible for postseason play due to NCAA violations

The 2014–15 Jackson State Tigers basketball team represented Jackson State University during the 2014–15 NCAA Division I men's basketball season. The Tigers, led by second year head coach Wayne Brent, played their home games at the Williams Assembly Center and were members of the Southwestern Athletic Conference. They finished the season 11–21, 9–9 in SWAC play to finish in a tie for fifth place. They lost in the quarterfinals of the SWAC tournament to Prairie View A&M.

== Roster ==
Number	Name	Position	Height	Weight	Year	Hometown
2	Derrell Taylor	Small Forward	6–6	200	Senior	Morton, Mississippi
3	Yettra Specks	Guard	5–10	160	Sophomore	Monroe, Louisiana
4	Dre'Sean Looney	Guard	5–10	170	Freshman	Memphis, Tennessee
5	Jaleel Queary	Guard	6–2	200	Senior	Milwaukee, Wisconsin
10	Raeford Worsham	Guard	6–4	190	Junior	Waynesboro, Mississippi
11	Gerrald Maddox	Guard	6–5	175	Sophomore	Birmingham, Alabama
12	Kaven Bernard	Forward	6–5	195	Junior	Napoleonville, Louisiana
15	Jalen Manumaleuga	Guard	5–11	170	Freshman	Pacific Pines, Queensland, Australia
20	Javeres Brent	Guard	6–3	195	Sophomore	Jackson, Mississippi
21	Kenneth Wachira	Forward	6–7	195	Sophomore	Kenya
22	Treshawn Boldin	Forward	6–8	235	Sophomore	Jackson, Mississippi
23	Jonathan Thomas	Guard	6–1	195	Freshman	Jackson, Mississippi
24	Marquis Todd	Forward	6–9	220	R-Freshman	Chicago, Illinois
25	Dominique Street	Guard	6–2	190	Freshman	Carson, California
31	Dontaveon Robinson	Guard	6–4	180	Sophomore	Jackson, Mississippi
33	Kenneth Taylor	Guard	6–3	185	Sophomore	Freeport, Bahamas
34	Pierre Crawford	Center	6–9	250	Senior	Eutaw, Alabama
35	Janarius Middleton	Forward	6–8	215	Sophomore	Greenwood, Mississippi

== Schedule ==
Date time, TV	Opponent	Result	Record	Site (attendance) city, state
Exhibition
11/04/2014*; 7:00 pm	Tougaloo	L 67–88	–	Williams Assembly Center (N/A); Jackson, MS
11/08/2014*; 5:30 pm	Delta State	W 58–53	–	Williams Assembly Center (N/A); Jackson, MS
Regular season
11/14/2014*; 7:00 pm	at NC State	L 58–93	0–1	PNC Arena (11,158); Raleigh, NC
11/16/2014*; 2:00 pm, ESPN3	at South Florida	L 64–73	0–2	USF Sun Dome (3,095); Tampa, FL
11/18/2014*; 7:00 pm	at Jacksonville	W 66–57	1–2	Jacksonville Veterans Memorial Arena (236); Jacksonville, FL
11/23/2014*; 2:00 pm	at UAB	L 50–58	1–3	Bartow Arena (2,023); Birmingham, AL
11/25/2014*; 7:00 pm	at St. Bonaventure	L 71–79	1–4	Reilly Center (2,951); St. Bonaventure, NY
11/28/2014*; 7:00 pm	Hofstra	L 56–86	1–5	Williams Assembly Center (278); Jackson, MS
12/03/2014*; 7:00 pm	at Louisiana–Lafayette	L 53–76	1–6	Cajundome (3,572); Lafayette, LA
12/06/2014*; 6:00 pm	at Louisiana Tech	L 52–65	1–7	Thomas Assembly Center (4,038); Ruston, LA
12/13/2014*; 7:00 pm	at Loyola (IL)	L 46–58	1–8	Joseph J. Gentile Arena (1,163); Chicago, IL
12/15/2014*; 7:00 pm	at Drake	L 66–76	1–9	Knapp Center (2,555); Des Moines, IA
12/18/2014*; 7:00 pm	Southern Miss	W 66–46	2–9	Williams Assembly Center (839); Jackson, MS
12/19/2014*; 1:00 pm, ESPN3	at Tulane	L 49–56	2–10	Devlin Fieldhouse (1,804); New Orleans, LA
12/22/2014*; 7:00 pm	North Carolina Central	L 64–67 ^{OT}	2–11	Williams Assembly Center (499); Jackson, MS
01/03/2015; 5:30 pm	at Alabama A&M	W 70–67	3–11 (1–0)	Elmore Gymnasium (526); Huntsville, AL
01/05/2015; 7:30 pm	at Alabama State	L 52–72	3–12 (1–1)	Dunn–Oliver Acadome (763); Montgomery, AL
01/10/2015; 5:30 pm	at Alcorn State	W 64–54	4–12 (2–1)	Williams Assembly Center (1,251); Jackson, MS
01/12/2015; 7:30 pm	Southern	L 52–60	4–13 (2–2)	Williams Assembly Center (736); Jackson, MS
01/17/2015; 5:30 pm	at Prairie View A&M	L 55–70	4–14 (2–3)	William J. Nicks Building (942); Prairie View, TX
01/19/2015; 7:30 pm	at Texas Southern	L 54–67	4–15 (2–4)	Health and Physical Education Arena (1,524); Houston, TX
01/24/2015; 5:30 pm	at Grambling State	W 74–63	5–15 (3–4)	Fredrick C. Hobdy Assembly Center (650); Grambling, LA
01/31/2015; 4:30 pm	at Mississippi Valley State	L 62–75	5–16 (3–5)	Leflore County Civic Center (2,498); Greenwood, MS
02/02/2015; 7:30 pm	Arkansas–Pine Bluff	W 69–45	6–16 (4–5)	Williams Assembly Center (1,171); Jackson, MS
02/07/2015; 5:30 pm	at Alcorn State	W 64–61	7–16 (5–5)	Davey Whitney Complex (N/A); Lorman, MS
02/09/2015; 7:30 pm	at Southern	W 62–52	8–16 (6–5)	F. G. Clark Center (1,635); Baton Rouge, LA
02/14/2015; 5:30 pm	Prairie View A&M	L 55–61	8–17 (6–6)	Williams Assembly Center (709); Jackson, MS
02/16/2015; 7:30 pm	Texas Southern	L 70–71 ^{OT}	8–18 (6–7)	Williams Assembly Center (399); Jackson, MS
02/21/2015; 5:30 pm	Grambling State	W 72–33	9–18 (7–7)	Williams Assembly Center (509); Jackson, MS
02/28/2015; 5:30 pm	Mississippi Valley State	W 73–49	10–18 (8–7)	Williams Assembly Center (1,457); Jackson, MS
03/02/2015; 7:30 pm	at Arkansas–Pine Bluff	L 62–64	10–19 (8–8)	K. L. Johnson Complex (2,997); Pine Bluff, AR
03/05/2015; 7:30 pm	Alabama A&M	W 72–54	11–19 (9–8)	Williams Assembly Center (537); Jackson, MS
03/07/2015; 5:30 pm	Alabama State	L 42–62	11–20 (9–9)	Williams Assembly Center (839); Jackson, MS
SWAC tournament
03/12/2015; 8:30 pm	vs. Prairie View A&M; Quarterfinals	L 56–62	11–21	Toyota Center (N/A); Houston, TX
*Non-conference game. ^{#}Rankings from AP Poll. (#) Tournament seedings in parentheses. All times are in Central Time.
