= 2014–15 Arkansas–Pine Bluff Golden Lions men's basketball team =

American college basketball season

2014–15 Arkansas–Pine Bluff Golden Lions men's basketball
- Conference: Southwestern Athletic Conference
- Record: 12–20 (9–9 SWAC)
- Head coach: George Ivory (7th season)
- Assistant coaches: Kenneth Broyles; Richard Cannon; Jarvis Gunter
- Home arena: K. L. Johnson Complex

2014–15 SWAC men's basketball standings
	Conf.				Overall
Team	W		L	PCT	W		L	PCT
Texas Southern †	16	–	2	.889	22	–	13	.629
Alabama State*	14	–	4	.778	19	–	10	.655
Southern*	13	–	5	.722	18	–	17	.514
Prairie View A&M	12	–	6	.667	15	–	18	.455
Arkansas–Pine Bluff*	9	–	9	.500	12	–	20	.375
Jackson State	9	–	9	.500	11	–	21	.344
Alabama A&M	8	–	10	.444	9	–	20	.310
Mississippi Valley State	5	–	13	.278	6	–	26	.188
Alcorn State	4	–	14	.222	6	–	26	.188
Grambling State	0	–	18	.000	2	–	27	.069
† 2015 SWAC tournament winner *ineligible for postseason play due to NCAA violations

The 2014–15 Arkansas–Pine Bluff Golden Lions men's basketball team represented the University of Arkansas at Pine Bluff during the 2014–15 NCAA Division I men's basketball season. The Golden Lions, led by seventh year head coach George Ivory, played their home games at the K. L. Johnson Complex and were members of the Southwestern Athletic Conference. They finished the season 12–20, 9–9 in SWAC play to finish in a tie for fifth place. The team did not participate in the SWAC tournament due to a postseason ban issued by the NCAA.

== Roster ==
Number	Name	Position	Height	Weight	Year	Hometown
00	Sean Tingle	Forward	6–9	230	Senior	Vance, Alabama
1	Marcel Mosley	Guard	6–0	180	Senior	Marion, Arkansas
3	Thaddeus Handley, Jr.	Forward	6–6	200	Junior	Pine Bluff, Arkansas
10	DeAndre McIntyre	Guard	6–3	180	Senior	Birmingham, Alabama
12	Jaylon Floyd	Guard	6–6	205	Senior	Detroit, Michigan
13	Austin Cox	Guard	6–4	175	Freshman	Belleville, Illinois
14	Tevin Hammond	Guard	6–0	185	Senior	Little Rock, Arkansas
15	Trent Whiting	Forward	6–7	205	Junior	Des Arc, Arkansas
21	Larry Johnson	Guard	6–2	175	Junior	Greenwood, Mississippi
22	JoVaughn Love	Guard/Forward	6–9	220	Junior	Pine Bluff, Arkansas
23	Ghiavonni Robinson	Guard	6–3	190	Sophomore	Itta Bena, Mississippi
25	Chauncy Parker	Center	6-8	225	Junior	West Memphis, Arkansas
30	Jordan Brown	Guard	6–4	185	Sophomore	Augusta, Arkansas
34	Devin Berry	Forward	6–7	220	Sophomore	Columbus, Mississippi
40	Jared Young	Guard	5–11	175	Senior	Memphis, Tennessee
52	David Tillman	Center	6–10	215	Sophomore	Houston, Texas

== Schedule ==
Date time, TV	Opponent	Result	Record	Site (attendance) city, state
Regular season
11/14/2014*; 11:30 pm	at Hawaiʻi; Rainbow Classic	L 57–85	0–1	Stan Sheriff Center (5,875); Honolulu, HI
11/15/2014*; 9:00 pm	vs. High Point; Rainbow Classic	L 62–74	0–2	Stan Sheriff Center (6,070); Honolulu, HI
11/17/2014*; 9:00 pm	vs. Cal State Bakersfield; Rainbow Classic	W 56–49	1-2	Stan Sheriff Center (5,805); Honolulu, HI
11/21/2014*; 5:00 pm	vs. Valparaiso; Central Michigan Tournament	L 46–59	1–3	McGuirk Arena (2,115); Mount Pleasant, MI
11/23/2014*; 12:30 pm	at Central Michigan; Central Michigan Tournament	L 43–75	1–4	McGuirk Arena (1,556); Mount Pleasant, MI
11/25/2014*; 6:00 pm	at Ohio	L 60–69	1–5	Convocation Center (5,641); Athens, OH
12/02/2014*; 7:00 pm	at Akron	L 60–81	1–6	James A. Rhodes Arena (2,378); Akron, OH
12/06/2014*; 2:15 pm, BTN	at No. 19 Michigan State	L 52–85	1–7	Breslin Student Events Center (14,797); East Lansing, MI
12/13/2014*; 2:00 pm	at Air Force	L 47–80	1–8	Clune Arena (1,561); Colorado Springs, CO
12/17/2014*; 7:00 pm	at Houston; Las Vegas Classic	W 61–56 ^{OT}	2–8	Hofheinz Pavilion (2,082); Houston, TX
12/19/2014*; 7:00 pm, FSSW+	at Texas Tech; Las Vegas Classic	L 51–72	2–9	United Supermarkets Arena (5,091); Lubbock, TX
12/21/2014*; 12:00 pm	vs. Southern Utah; Las Vegas Classic	W 70–61	3–9	Orleans Arena (N/A); Paradise, NV
12/23/2014*; 5:00 pm	vs. Abilene Christian; Las Vegas Classic	L 61–69	3–10	Orleans Arena (1,700); Paradise, NV
12/29/2014*; 8:00 pm, P12N	at Stanford	L 39–74	3–11	Maples Pavilion (4,337); Stanford, CA
01/03/2015; 7:30 pm	Mississippi Valley State	L 63–67	3–12 (0–1)	K. L. Johnson Complex (1,747); Pine Bluff, AR
01/10/2015; 7:30 pm	Alabama State	L 71–74	3–13 (0–2)	K. L. Johnson Complex (1,798); Pine Bluff, AR
01/12/2015; 7:30 pm	Alabama A&M	L 48–51	3–14 (0–3)	K. L. Johnson Complex (1,589); Pine Bluff, AR
01/17/2015; 7:30 pm	at Southern	L 60–70	3–15 (0–4)	F. G. Clark Center (1,212); Baton Rouge, LA
01/19/2015; 7:30 pm	at Alcorn State	W 54–49	4–15 (1–4)	Davey Whitney Complex (1,137); Lorman, MS
01/24/2015; 7:30 pm	Texas Southern	W 66–62	5–15 (2–4)	K. L. Johnson Complex (2,002); Pine Bluff, AR
01/26/2015; 7:30 pm	Prairie View A&M	W 105–68	6–15 (3–4)	K. L. Johnson Complex (4,376); Pine Bluff, AR
01/31/2015; 5:30 pm	at Grambling State	W 65–53	7–15 (4–4)	Fredrick C. Hobdy Assembly Center (500); Grambling, LA
02/02/2015; 7:30 pm	at Jackson State	L 45–69	7–16 (4–5)	Williams Assembly Center (1,171); Jackson, MS
02/07/2015; 7:30 pm	at Alabama State	L 55–73	7–17 (4–6)	Dunn–Oliver Acadome (2,560); Montgomery, AL
02/09/2015; 7:30 pm	at Alabama A&M	W 53–42	8–17 (5–6)	Elmore Gymnasium (1,253); Huntsville, AL
02/14/2015; 7:30 pm	Southern	L 56–74	8–18 (5–7)	K. L. Johnson Complex (3,226); Pine Bluff, AR
02/17/2015; 7:30 pm	Alcorn State	W 74–70	9–18 (6–7)	K. L. Johnson Complex (2,893); Pine Bluff, AR
02/21/2015; 7:30 pm	at Texas Southern	L 50–56	9–19 (6–8)	Health and Physical Education Arena (1,024); Houston, TX
02/23/2015; 8:00 pm	at Prairie View A&M	L 58–79	9–20 (6–9)	William Nicks Building (649); Prairie View, TX
02/28/2015; 7:30 pm	Grambling State	W 66–57	10–20 (7–9)	K. L. Johnson Complex (3,406); Pine Bluff, AR
03/02/2015; 7:30 pm	Jackson State	W 64–62	11–20 (8–9)	K. L. Johnson Complex (2,997); Pine Bluff, AR
03/06/2015; 11:00 am	at Mississippi Valley State; Postponed from 3/5/15	W 94–75	12–20 (9–9)	Leflore County Civic Center (987); Greenwood, MS
*Non-conference game. ^{#}Rankings from AP Poll. (#) Tournament seedings in parentheses. All times are in Central Time.
