= 2014–15 Southern Jaguars basketball team =

American college basketball season

2014–15 Southern Jaguars men's basketball
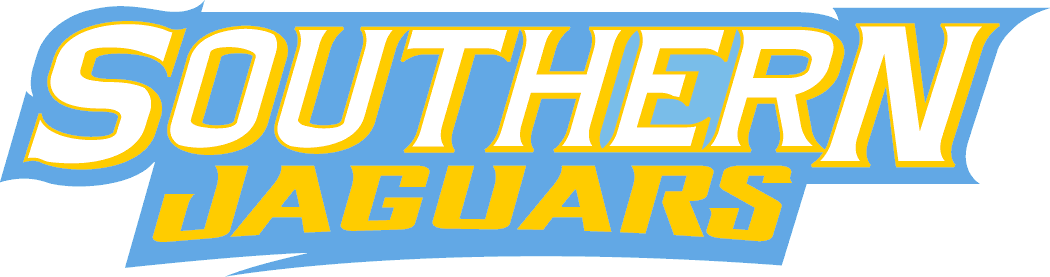
- Conference: Southwestern Athletic Conference
- Record: 18–17 (13–5 SWAC)
- Head coach: Roman Banks (4th season)
- Assistant coaches: Rodney Kirschner; Petey Cipriano; Morris Scott; Jethro Hillman
- Home arena: F. G. Clark Center

2014–15 SWAC men's basketball standings
| | Conf. | | | | Overall |
| Team | W | | L | PCT | W | | L | PCT |
|---|---|---|---|---|---|---|---|---|
| Texas Southern † | 16 | – | 2 | .889 | 22 | – | 13 | .629 |
| Alabama State* | 14 | – | 4 | .778 | 19 | – | 10 | .655 |
| Southern* | 13 | – | 5 | .722 | 18 | – | 17 | .514 |
| Prairie View A&M | 12 | – | 6 | .667 | 15 | – | 18 | .455 |
| Arkansas–Pine Bluff* | 9 | – | 9 | .500 | 12 | – | 20 | .375 |
| Jackson State | 9 | – | 9 | .500 | 11 | – | 21 | .344 |
| Alabama A&M | 8 | – | 10 | .444 | 9 | – | 20 | .310 |
| Mississippi Valley State | 5 | – | 13 | .278 | 6 | – | 26 | .188 |
| Alcorn State | 4 | – | 14 | .222 | 6 | – | 26 | .188 |
| Grambling State | 0 | – | 18 | .000 | 2 | – | 27 | .069 |
† 2015 SWAC tournament winner *ineligible for postseason play due to NCAA violations

The 2014–15 Southern Jaguars basketball team represented Southern University during the 2014–15 NCAA Division I men's basketball season. The Jaguars, led by fourth year head coach Roman Banks, played their home games at the F. G. Clark Center and were members of the Southwestern Athletic Conference. They finished the season 18–17, 13–5 in SWAC play to finish in third place. They advanced to the championship game of the SWAC tournament where they lost to Texas Southern. Had they won the SWAC Tournament, they would not have qualified for the NCAA Tournament due to a postseason ban due to failing to supply usable academic data to the NCAA.

== Roster ==
| Number | Name | Position | Height | Weight | Year | Hometown |
|---|---|---|---|---|---|---|
| 0 | Christopher Hyder | Guard | 5–11 | 170 | Junior | Dallas, Texas |
| 1 | Thomas Pierre-Louis | Forward | 6–9 | 210 | Junior | Miami, Florida |
| 2 | Adrian Rodgers | Guard | 6–4 | 205 | Junior | Atlanta, Georgia |
| 3 | Trelun Banks | Guard | 6–1 | 170 | Sophomore | Shreveport, Louisiana |
| 4 | Keith Davis | Forward | 6–10 | 231 | Senior | Dallas, Texas |
| 5 | Michael Harrel | Guard | 5–11 | 180 | Senior | Baton Rouge, Louisiana |
| 10 | Cameron Monroe | Guard | 6–2 | 200 | Senior | Shreveport, Louisiana |
| 11 | Rashad Andrews | Guard | 6–5 | 190 | Freshman | Brooklyn, New York |
| 12 | Jarred Sam | Forward | 6–9 | 210 | Freshman | Baton Rouge, Louisiana |
| 22 | Frank Snow | Center | 6–10 | 230 | Senior | Wellington, Florida |
| 23 | LaQuentin Collins | Guard | 6–2 | 170 | Freshman | Monroe, Louisiana |
| 24 | Chris Thomas | Guard | 6–4 | 190 | Freshman | Baton Rouge, Louisiana |
| 25 | Elex Carter | Forward | 6–7 | 190 | R-Sophomore | LaPlace, Louisiana |
| 30 | Tre Lynch | Guard | 6–0 | 160 | R-Senior | Lancaster, Texas |
| 35 | Joell Hopkins | Forward | 6–7 | 205 | Senior | Durham, North Carolina |
| 50 | Shawn Prudhomme | Forward | 6–4 | 215 | Junior | Beaumont, Texas |

== Schedule ==
| Date time, TV | Opponent | Result | Record | Site (attendance) city, state |
Regular season
| 11/14/2014*; 8:00 pm | Louisiana Tech | L 76–85 | 0–1 | F.G. Clark Center (1,104); Baton Rouge, LA |
| 11/17/2014*; 7:00 pm | LSU-Alexandria | W 76–65 | 1–1 | F.G. Clark Center (1,024); Baton Rouge, LA |
| 11/20/2014*; 8:00 pm, SECN | at Ole Miss; Emerald Coast Classic | L 38–69 | 1–2 | Tad Smith Coliseum (5,199); Oxford, MS |
| 11/22/2014*; 3:30 pm | at Middle Tennessee; Emerald Coast Classic | L 48–66 | 1–3 | Murphy Center (4,092); Murfreesboro, TN |
| 11/25/2014*; 8:00 pm | at Tulane | L 59–74 | 1–4 | Devlin Fieldhouse (556); New Orleans, LA |
| 11/28/2014*; 1:30 pm | vs. Northern Arizona; Emerald Coast Classic | L 63–70 | 1–5 | The Arena at NWFSC (410); Niceville, FL |
| 11/29/2014*; 11:00 am | vs. Eastern Illinois; Emerald Coast Classic | L 43–54 | 1–6 | The Arena at NWFSC (135); Niceville, FL |
| 12/05/2014*; 7:00 pm | Dillard | W 68–55 | 2–6 | F.G. Clark Center (321); Baton Rouge, LA |
| 12/10/2014*; 8:00 pm, ESPN3 | at Minnesota | L 57-85 | 2–7 | Williams Arena (11,409); Minneapolis, MN |
| 12/14/2014*; 5:00 pm, Cyclones.tv | at No. 14 Iowa State | L 78–88 | 2–8 | Hilton Coliseum (14,384); Ames, IA |
| 12/16/2014*; 7:00 pm | Champion Baptist | W 114–50 | 3–8 | F.G. Clark Center (169); Baton Rouge, LA |
| 12/20/2014*; 2:00 pm | at Wyoming | L 39–57 | 3–9 | Arena-Auditorium (4,925); Laramie, WY |
| 12/22/2014*; 8:00 pm | at No. 22 Baylor | L 66–70 | 3–10 | Ferrell Center (5,379); Waco, TX |
| 12/29/2014*; 7:00 pm | at Hawaii | L 57–71 | 3–11 | Stan Sheriff Center (5,945); Honolulu, HI |
| 01/03/2015; 5:30 pm | Prairie View A&M | W 68–56 | 4–11 (1–0) | F.G. Clark Center (623); Baton Rouge, LA |
| 01/05/2015; 8:00 pm, ESPNU | Texas Southern | L 58–59 | 4–12 (1–1) | F.G. Clark Center (656); Baton Rouge, LA |
| 01/10/2015; 7:30 pm | at Grambling State | W 59–53 | 5–12 (2–1) | Fredrick C. Hobdy Assembly Center (725); Grambling, LA |
| 01/12/2015; 7:30 pm | at Jackson State | W 60–52 | 6–12 (3–1) | Williams Assembly Center (736); Jackson, MS |
| 01/17/2015; 5:30 pm | Arkansas–Pine Bluff | W 70–60 | 7–12 (4–1) | F.G. Clark Center (1,212); Baton Rouge, LA |
| 01/19/2015; 8:00 pm | Mississippi Valley State | W 79–55 | 8–12 (5–1) | F.G. Clark Center (1,122); Baton Rouge, LA |
| 01/24/2015; 6:30 pm | at Alabama A&M | W 65–58 | 9–12 (6–1) | Elmore Gymnasium (1,327); Huntsville, AL |
| 01/26/2015; 7:30 pm | at Alabama State | L 59–63 ^{OT} | 9–13 (6–2) | Dunn–Oliver Acadome (1,546); Montgomery, AL |
| 01/31/2015; 3:00 pm | at Alcorn State | W 65–56 | 10–13 (7–2) | Davey Whitney Complex (5,093); Lorman, MS |
| 02/07/2015; 5:30 pm | Grambling State | W 58–50 | 11–13 (8–2) | F.G. Clark Center (2,859); Baton Rouge, LA |
| 02/09/2015; 8:00 pm | Jackson State | L 52–62 | 11–14 (8–3) | F.G. Clark Center (1,635); Baton Rouge, LA |
| 02/14/2015; 7:30 pm | at Arkansas–Pine Bluff | W 74–56 | 12–14 (9–3) | K. L. Johnson Complex (3,226); Pine Bluff, AR |
| 02/16/2015; 8:00 pm | at Mississippi Valley State | W 68–56 | 13–14 (10–3) | Leflore County Civic Center (782); Greenwood, MS |
| 02/21/2015; 5:30 pm | Alabama A&M | W 72–63 | 14–14 (11–3) | F.G. Clark Center (1,633); Baton Rouge, LA |
| 02/23/2015; 8:00 pm, ESPNU | Alabama State | L 54–56 | 14–15 (11–4) | F.G. Clark Center (1,389); Baton Rouge, LA |
| 02/28/2015; 5:30 pm | Alcorn State | W 71–63 | 15–15 (12–4) | F.G. Clark Center (1,814); Baton Rouge, LA |
| 03/05/2015; 7:30 pm | at Prairie View A&M | W 77–73 | 16–15 (13–4) | William J. Nicks Building (867); Prairie View, TX |
| 03/07/2015; 7:30 pm | at Texas Southern | L 78–88 | 16–16 (13–5) | Health and Physical Education Arena; Houston, TX |
SWAC tournament
| 03/12/2015; 2:30 pm | vs. Alabama A&M; Quarterfinals | W 64–60 | 17–16 | Toyota Center (N/A); Houston, TX |
| 03/13/2015; 2:30 pm | vs. Alabama State; Semifinals | W 68–66 | 18–16 | Toyota Center (N/A); Houston, TX |
| 03/14/2015; 5:30 pm | vs. Texas Southern; Championship game | L 58–62 | 18–17 | Toyota Center (N/A); Houston, TX |
*Non-conference game. ^{#}Rankings from AP Poll. (#) Tournament seedings in parentheses. All times are in Central Time.
