= 2014–15 Prairie View A&M Panthers basketball team =

American college basketball season

2014–15 Prairie View A&M Panthers men's basketball
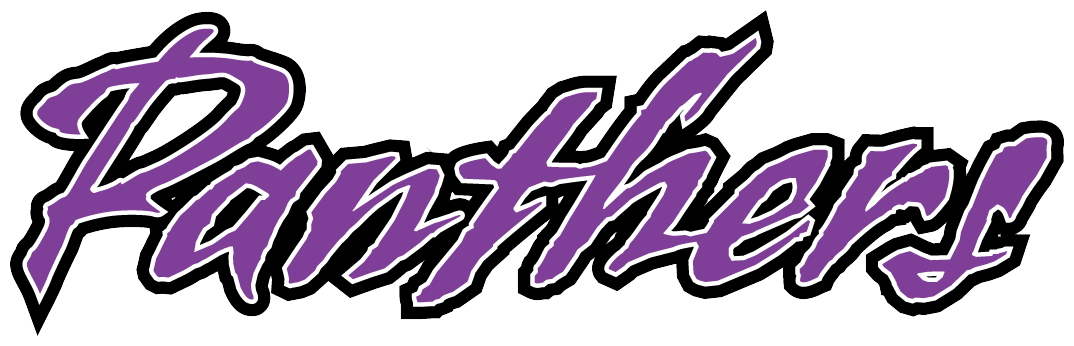
- Conference: Southwestern Athletic Conference
- Record: 15–18 (12–6 SWAC)
- Head coach: Byron Rimm II (9th season)
- Assistant coaches: Byron Smith (2nd season); Ryan Price (1st season); Keenan Curry (1st season)
- Home arena: William Nicks Building

2014–15 SWAC men's basketball standings
	Conf.				Overall
Team	W		L	PCT	W		L	PCT
Texas Southern †	16	–	2	.889	22	–	13	.629
Alabama State*	14	–	4	.778	19	–	10	.655
Southern*	13	–	5	.722	18	–	17	.514
Prairie View A&M	12	–	6	.667	15	–	18	.455
Arkansas–Pine Bluff*	9	–	9	.500	12	–	20	.375
Jackson State	9	–	9	.500	11	–	21	.344
Alabama A&M	8	–	10	.444	9	–	20	.310
Mississippi Valley State	5	–	13	.278	6	–	26	.188
Alcorn State	4	–	14	.222	6	–	26	.188
Grambling State	0	–	18	.000	2	–	27	.069
† 2015 SWAC tournament winner *ineligible for postseason play due to NCAA violations

The 2014–15 Prairie View A&M Panthers basketball team represented Prairie View A&M University during the 2014–15 NCAA Division I men's basketball season. The Panthers, led by ninth year head coach Byron Rimm II, played their home games at the William Nicks Building and were members of the Southwestern Athletic Conference. They finished the season 15–18, 12–6 in SWAC play to finish in fourth place. They advanced to the semifinals of the SWAC tournament where they lost to Texas Southern.

== Roster ==
Number	Name	Position	Height	Weight	Year	Hometown
0	Jacoby Green	Guard	6–4	175	Junior	Houston, Texas
1	Jayrn Johnson	Guard	6–3	180	Sophomore	Dallas, Texas
2	Avery Lomax	Guard	5–9	160	Sophomore	Dallas, Texas
3	Jordan Giddings	Guard	6–0	180	Sophomore	Dallas, Texas
5	Tre Hagood	Guard	6–2	174	Sophomore	Pensacola, Florida
12	John Brisco	Guard	5–11	210	Senior	Longview, Texas
14	Zachary Hamilton	Forward	6–4	200	Freshman	Houston, Texas
15	Delvon Rencher	Forward	6–6	200	Junior	Homewood, Illinois
22	Charleston Dobbs	Forward	6–8	210	Junior	Dumas, Arkansas
23	Stephen Walker	Guard	6–1	185	Freshman	Houston, Texas
30	Karim York	Forward	6–9	225	Junior	Austin, Texas
31	Montrael Scott	Guard	6–3	195	Senior	Dallas, Texas
32	Nolan Wilson	Forward	6–6	230	Freshman	Laredo, Texas
35	Reggis Onwukamuche	Center	6–10	225	Senior	Missouri City, Texas
	Storm Watson	Forward	6–7	200	Freshman	Corpus Christi, Texas

== Schedule ==
Date time, TV	Opponent	Result	Record	Site (attendance) city, state
Regular season
11/14/2014*; 7:00 pm	at TCU	L 54–71	0–1	Wilkerson-Greines Activity Center (3,669); Fort Worth, TX
11/16/2014*; 2:00 pm	at Oklahoma State	L 52–74	0–2	Gallagher-Iba Arena (2,213); Stillwater, OK
11/19/2014*; 7:00 pm	at Rice	L 64–68	0–3	Tudor Fieldhouse (1,092); Houston, TX
11/21/2014*; 6:00 pm, FSSW	at Baylor; Las Vegas Invitational	L 45–60	0–4	Ferrell Center (5,208); Waco, TX
11/24/2014*; 6:00 pm, ESPN3	at Memphis; Las Vegas Invitational	L 49–77	0–5	FedExForum (14,412); Memphis, TN
11/27/2014*; 6:00 pm, RTSW	vs. Stephen F. Austin; Las Vegas Invitational	L 61–73	0–6	Orleans Arena (355); Paradise, NV
11/28/2014*; 1:30 pm	vs. Brown; Las Vegas Invitational	L 71–81	0–7	Orleans Arena (665); Paradise, NV
12/03/2014*; 7:30 pm	Schreiner	W 64–48	1–7	William Nicks Building (2,411); Prairie View, TX
12/06/2014*; 4:00 pm	at Texas State	L 65–81	1–8	Strahan Coliseum (1,457); San Marcos, TX
12/14/2014*; 1:00 pm, FSSW	at Texas Tech	L 51–79	1–9	United Supermarkets Arena (5,122); Lubbock, TX
12/20/2014*; 4:30 pm	at Sam Houston State	L 44–61	1–10	Bernard Johnson Coliseum (626); Huntsville, TX
12/23/2014*; 7:00 pm	at North Texas	W 70–67	2–10	The Super Pit (2,117); Denton, TX
12/30/2014*; 11:00 pm	at Hawaii	L 68–76	2–11	Stan Sheriff Center (5,144); Honolulu, HI
01/03/2015; 5:30 pm	at Southern	L 56–68	2–12 (0–1)	F. G. Clark Center (623); Baton Rouge, LA
01/05/2015; 7:30 pm	at Alcorn State	L 62–68	2–13 (0–2)	Davey Whitney Complex (391); Lorman, MS
01/10/2015; 7:30 pm	Texas Southern	L 77–81	2–14 (0–3)	William Nicks Building (931); Prairie View, TX
01/17/2015; 5:00 pm	Jackson State	W 70–55	3–14 (1–3)	William Nicks Building (942); Prairie View, TX
01/19/2015; 7:30 pm	Grambling State	W 74–60	4–14 (2–3)	William Nicks Building (1,129); Prairie View, TX
01/24/2015; 5:00 pm	at Mississippi Valley State	W 72–65	5–14 (3–3)	Leflore County Civic Center (938); Greenwood, MS
01/26/2015; 7:30 pm	at Arkansas–Pine Bluff	L 68–105	5–15 (3–4)	K. L. Johnson Complex (4,376); Pine Bluff, AR
01/31/2015; 5:00 pm	Alabama A&M	W 89–63	6–15 (4–4)	William Nicks Building (782); Prairie View, TX
02/02/2015; 7:30 pm	Alabama State	L 71–73	6–16 (4–5)	William Nicks Building (1,022); Prairie View, TX
02/07/2015; 7:30 pm	at Texas Southern	W 58–55	7–16 (5–5)	Health and Physical Education Arena (7,586); Houston, TX
02/14/2015; 5:30 pm	at Jackson State	W 61–55	8–16 (6–5)	Williams Assembly Center (709); Jackson, MS
02/16/2015; 5:30 pm	at Grambling State	W 95–44	9–16 (7–5)	Fredrick C. Hobdy Assembly Center (139); Grambling, LA
02/21/2015; 5:00 pm	Mississippi Valley State	W 84–74	10–16 (8–5)	William Nicks Building (412); Prairie View, TX
02/23/2015; 7:30 pm	Arkansas–Pine Bluff	W 79–58	11–16 (9–5)	William Nicks Building (649); Prairie View, TX
02/28/2015; 5:00 pm	at Alabama A&M	W 75–72	12–16 (10–5)	Elmore Gymnasium (1,487); Huntsville, AL
03/02/2015; 7:30 pm	at Alabama State	W 67–65	13–16 (11–5)	Dunn–Oliver Acadome (2,456); Montgomery, AL
03/05/2015; 7:30 pm	Southern	L 73–77	13–17 (11–6)	William Nicks Building (867); Prairie View, TX
03/07/2015; 5:00 pm	Alcorn State	W 83–80	14–17 (12–6)	William Nicks Building (1,256); Prairie View, TX
SWAC tournament
03/12/2015; 8:30 pm	vs. Jackson State; Quarterfinals	W 62–56	15–17	Toyota Center (N/A); Houston, TX
03/13/2015; 8:30 pm	vs. Texas Southern; Semifinals	L 77–90	15–18	Toyota Center (N/A); Houston, TX
*Non-conference game. ^{#}Rankings from AP Poll. (#) Tournament seedings in parentheses. All times are in Central Time.
