= 2014–15 Mississippi Valley State Delta Devils basketball team =

American college basketball season

2014–15 Mississippi Valley State Delta Devils men's basketball
- Conference: Southwestern Athletic Conference
- Record: 6–26 (5–13 SWAC)
- Head coach: Andre Payne (1st season)
- Assistant coaches: Eric Strothers; Adaiah Curry
- Home arena: Leflore County Civic Center; The Pinnacle

2014–15 SWAC men's basketball standings
	Conf.				Overall
Team	W		L	PCT	W		L	PCT
Texas Southern †	16	–	2	.889	22	–	13	.629
Alabama State*	14	–	4	.778	19	–	10	.655
Southern*	13	–	5	.722	18	–	17	.514
Prairie View A&M	12	–	6	.667	15	–	18	.455
Arkansas–Pine Bluff*	9	–	9	.500	12	–	20	.375
Jackson State	9	–	9	.500	11	–	21	.344
Alabama A&M	8	–	10	.444	9	–	20	.310
Mississippi Valley State	5	–	13	.278	6	–	26	.188
Alcorn State	4	–	14	.222	6	–	26	.188
Grambling State	0	–	18	.000	2	–	27	.069
† 2015 SWAC tournament winner *ineligible for postseason play due to NCAA violations

The 2014–15 Mississippi Valley State Delta Devils basketball team represented Mississippi Valley State University during the 2014–15 NCAA Division I men's basketball season. The Delta Devils, led by first year head coach Andre Payne, were members of the Southwestern Athletic Conference. Due to continued renovations to their normal home stadium, the Harrison HPER Complex, they played their home games at the Leflore County Civic Center in Greenwood, Mississippi and one home game at The Pinnacle on the campus of Coahoma Community College. They finished the season 6–26, 5–13 in SWAC play to finish in eighth place. They lost in the quarterfinals of the SWAC tournament to Alabama State.

== Roster ==
Number	Name	Position	Height	Weight	Year	Hometown
0	Vacha Vzaughn	Forward	6–4	210	Sophomore	Memphis, Tennessee
1	DeAngelo Priar	Guard	6–3	182	Senior	Tchula, Mississippi
2	Jordan Washington	Guard	5–10	174	Sophomore	Memphis, Tennessee
3	Billy Jackson	Guard	6–0	195	Junior	Tunica, Mississippi
5	Jeffrey Simmons	Guard	6–1	178	Senior	Greenwood, Mississippi
10	Tyler Corley	Guard	5–10	175	Junior	Indianapolis, Indiana
11	Rakwan Kelly	Forward	6–3	176	Freshman	Newark, New Jersey
13	Charles Bargman	Forward	6–7	215	Junior	Tarpon Springs, Florida
15	Swain Whitfield	Forward	6–6	226	Freshman	Forrest City, Arkansas
23	Latrell Love	Center	6–5	218	Junior	Minneapolis, Minnesota
24	Isaac Williams	Guard	6–4	187	Sophomore	Powder Springs, Georgia
25	Jurmelle Hall	Guard	6–2	185	Junior	Tchula, Mississippi
32	Ben Milshtein	Forward	6–8	225	Junior	Rehovot, Israel

== Schedule ==
Date time, TV	Opponent	Result	Record	Site (attendance) city, state
Exhibition
11/03/2014*; 7:00 pm	Stillman	W 81–76		Leflore County Civic Center; Greenwood, MS
Regular season
11/14/2014*; 6:00 pm	at Indiana	L 65–116	0–1	Assembly Hall (17,349); Bloomington, IN
11/17/2014*; 7:00 pm	at Mississippi State; Corpus Christi Coastal Classic	L 68–89	0–2	The Hump (6,065); Starkville, MS
11/20/2014*; 7:00 pm	at Tulane	L 61–100	0–3	The Hump (731); New Orleans, LA
11/24/2014*; 7:00 pm	at TCU; Corpus Christi Coastal Classic	L 53–106	0–4	Wilkerson-Greines Activity Center (3,058); Fort Worth, TX
11/26/2014*; 7:00 pm	at North Texas	L 52–67	0–5	The Super Pit (1,418); Denton, TX
11/28/2014*; 3:00 pm	vs. Texas A&M–Corpus Christi; Corpus Christi Coastal Classic	L 66–75	0–6	American Bank Center (6,039); Corpus Christi, TX
11/29/2014*; 10:30 pm	vs. North Carolina A&T; Corpus Christi Coastal Classic	W 66–63	1–6	American Bank Center (N/A); Corpus Christi, TX
12/03/2014*; 11:00 pm	at Oregon State	L 50–74	1–7	Gill Coliseum (3,656); Corvallis, OR
12/14/2014*; 5:00 pm, BTN	at Northwestern	L 49–101	1–8	Welsh-Ryan Arena (6,277); Evanston, IL
12/16/2014*; 7:00 pm, ESPN3	at Northern Illinois	L 64–71	1–9	Convocation Center (680); DeKalb, IL
12/20/2014*; 3:00 pm	North Carolina Central	L 60–94	1–10	The Pinnacle (397); Clarksdale, MS
12/28/2014*; 4:00 pm, ESPN3	at Houston	L 53–80	1–11	Hofheinz Pavilion (2,147); Houston, TX
12/31/2014*; 6:00 pm	at No. 9 Iowa State	L 33–83	1–12	Hilton Coliseum (14,384); Ames, IA
01/03/2015; 5:00 pm	at Arkansas–Pine Bluff	W 67–63	2–12 (1–0)	K. L. Johnson Complex (1,747); Pine Bluff, AR
01/10/2015; 5:00 pm	Alabama A&M	L 73–86	2–13 (1–1)	Leflore County Civic Center (1,098); Greenwood, MS
01/12/2015; 8:00 pm	Alabama State	L 76–88	2–14 (1–2)	Leflore County Civic Center (1,296); Greenwood, MS
01/17/2015; 5:00 pm	at Alcorn State	L 67–87	2–15 (1–3)	Davey Whitney Complex (N/A); Lorman, MS
01/19/2015; 8:00 pm	at Southern	L 55–79	2–16 (1–4)	F. G. Clark Center (1,122); Baton Rouge, LA
01/24/2015; 5:00 pm	Prairie View A&M	L 65–72	2–17 (1–5)	Leflore County Civic Center (938); Greenwood, MS
01/26/2015; 8:00 pm	Texas Southern	L 84–85 ^{3OT}	2–18 (1–6)	Leflore County Civic Center (452); Greenwood, MS
0/31/2015; 5:00 pm	Jackson State	W 75–62	3–18 (2–6)	Leflore County Civic Center (2,498); Greenwood, MS
02/02/2015; 8:00 pm	at Grambling State	W 68–65	4–18 (3–6)	Fredrick C. Hobdy Assembly Center (N/A); Grambling, LA
02/07/2015; 5:30 pm	at Alabama A&M	L 68–74	4–19 (3–7)	Elmore Gymnasium (719); Huntsville, AL
02/09/2015; 8:00 pm	at Alabama State	L 57–65	4–20 (3–8)	Dunn–Oliver Acadome (2,256); Montgmery, AL
02/14/2015; 5:00 pm	Alcorn State	W 74–62	5–20 (4–8)	Leflore County Civic Center (N/A); Greenwood, MS
02/16/2015; 8:00 pm	Southern	L 56–68	5–21 (4–9)	Leflore County Civic Center (782); Greenwood, MS
02/21/2015; 5:30 pm	at Prairie View A&M	L 73–83	5–22 (4–10)	William J. Nicks Building (1,021); Prairie View, TX
02/23/2015; 8:00 pm	at Texas Southern	L 74–84	5–23 (4–11)	Health and Physical Education Arena (412); Houston, TX
02/28/2015; 5:30 pm	at Jackson State	W 73–49	5–24 (4–12)	Williams Assembly Center (1,457); Jackson, MS
03/02/2015; 8:00 pm	Grambling State	W 66–62	6–24 (5–12)	Leflore County Civic Center (N/A); Greenwood, MS
03/06/2015; 11:00 am	Arkansas–Pine Bluff; Postponed from 3/5/15	L 75–94	6–25 (5–13)	Leflore County Civic Center (987); Greenwood, MS
SWAC tournament
03/11/2015; 3:30 pm	vs. Alabama State	L 81–93	6–26	Toyota Center (N/A); Houston, TX
*Non-conference game. ^{#}Rankings from AP Poll. (#) Tournament seedings in parentheses. All times are in Central Time.
