= 2015 SWAC men's basketball tournament =

- Tournament logo
- Classification: Division I
- Season: 2014–15
- Teams: 9
- Site: Toyota Center; Houston, Texas
- Champions: Texas Southern (6th title)
- Winning coach: Mike Davis (2nd title)
- MVP: Madarious Gibbs (Texas Southern)

2014–15 SWAC men's basketball standings
	Conf.				Overall
Team	W		L	PCT	W		L	PCT
Texas Southern †	16	–	2	.889	22	–	13	.629
Alabama State*	14	–	4	.778	19	–	10	.655
Southern*	13	–	5	.722	18	–	17	.514
Prairie View A&M	12	–	6	.667	15	–	18	.455
Arkansas–Pine Bluff*	9	–	9	.500	12	–	20	.375
Jackson State	9	–	9	.500	11	–	21	.344
Alabama A&M	8	–	10	.444	9	–	20	.310
Mississippi Valley State	5	–	13	.278	6	–	26	.188
Alcorn State	4	–	14	.222	6	–	26	.188
Grambling State	0	–	18	.000	2	–	27	.069
*ineligible for postseason play due to NCAA violations
† 2015 SWAC tournament winner

The 2015 SWAC men's basketball tournament took place March 10–14 at the Toyota Center in Houston, Texas.

== Format ==
Nine teams participated in the 2015 tournament. Alabama State was banned from postseason play due to failing to meet the NCAA's APR requirements. Southern was ineligible for the postseason due to failure to supply usable academic data to the NCAA. However, Southern and Alabama State did participate in the SWAC Tournament but could not qualify for the NCAA Tournament if they were to win the SWAC Tournament.

Arkansas–Pine Bluff did not participate in the tournament due to a postseason ban issued by the NCAA.

== Schedule ==
Session	Game	Time*	Matchup^{#}	Television	Score
First round – Tuesday, March 10
1	1	8:30 pm	#8 Alcorn State vs. #9 Grambling State		66–52
Quarterfinals – Wednesday, March 11
2	2	2:30 pm	#2 Alabama State vs. #7 Mississippi Valley State		93–81
2	3	8:30 pm	#1 Texas Southern vs. #8 Alcorn State		95–74
Quarterfinals – Thursday, March 12
3	4	2:30 pm	#3 Southern vs. #6 Alabama A&M		64–60
3	5	8:30 pm	#4 Prairie View A&M vs. #5 Jackson State		62–56
Semifinals – Friday, March 13
4	6	2:30 pm	#2 Alabama State vs. #3 Southern		68–66
4	7^	8:30 pm	#1 Texas Southern vs. #4 Prairie View A&M		90–77
Championship – Saturday, March 14
5	8		#3 Southern vs. #1 Texas Southern		62-58

*Game times in Central Time. #Rankings denote tournament seeding.

== Bracket ==
First round Tuesday, March 10
8	Alcorn State	66
9	Grambling State	52

Quarterfinals; Wednesday, March 11; Thursday, March 12
1	Texas Southern	95
8	Alcorn State	74
4	Prairie View A&M	62
5	Jackson State	56
2	Alabama State*	93
7	Mississippi Valley State	81
3	Southern*	64
6	Alabama A&M	60

Semifinals; Friday, March 13
1	Texas Southern	90
4	Prairie View A&M	77
2	Alabama State*	66
3	Southern*	68

Championship; Saturday, March 14
1	Texas Southern	62
3	Southern*	58

* Ineligible for NCAA tournament play due to penalties.
