= 2014–15 Murray State Racers men's basketball team =

American college basketball season

2014–15 Murray State Racers men's basketball
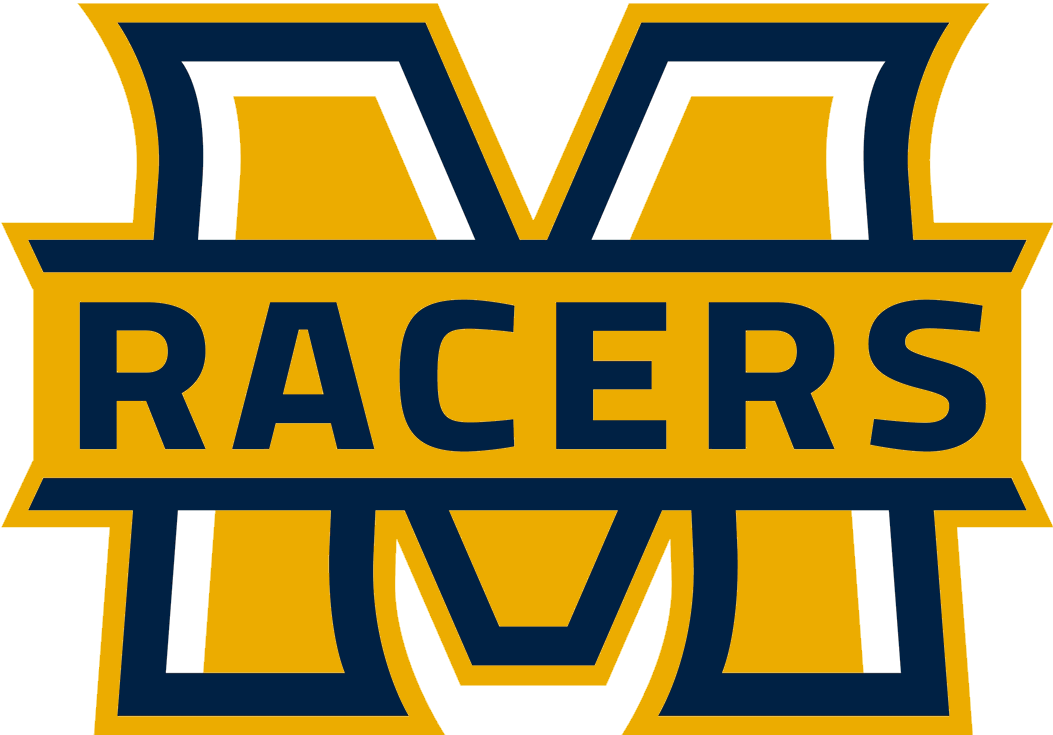

OVC Regular Season champions OVC West Division champions

NIT, Quarterfinals
- Conference: Ohio Valley Conference
- West Division
- Record: 29–6 (16–0 OVC)
- Head coach: Steve Prohm (4th season)
- Assistant coaches: William Small; Matt McMahon; James Kane
- Home arena: CFSB Center

2014–15 Ohio Valley Conference men's basketball standings
	Conf.				Overall
Team	W		L	PCT	W		L	PCT
East
Belmont †	11	–	5	.688	22	–	11	.667
Eastern Kentucky	11	–	5	.688	21	–	12	.636
Morehead State	10	–	6	.625	17	–	17	.500
Jacksonville State	5	–	11	.313	12	–	19	.387
Tennessee Tech	4	–	12	.250	12	–	18	.400
Tennessee State	2	–	14	.125	5	–	26	.161
West
Murray State	16	–	0	1.000	29	–	6	.829
UT Martin	10	–	6	.625	21	–	13	.618
Eastern Illinois	9	–	7	.563	18	–	15	.545
SIU Edwardsville	8	–	8	.500	12	–	16	.429
Southeast Missouri St.	7	–	9	.438	13	–	17	.433
Austin Peay	3	–	13	.188	8	–	22	.267
† 2015 OVC tournament winner Rankings from AP poll

The 2014–15 Murray State Racers men's basketball team represented Murray State University during the 2014–15 NCAA Division I men's basketball season. The Racers, led by fourth year head coach Steve Prohm, played their home games at the CFSB Center and were members of the West Division of the Ohio Valley Conference. They finished the season 29–6, 16–0 in OVC play to win the West Division championship and the overall OVC regular season championship. After a 2–4 start, the Racers won 25 games in a row before losing in the championship game of the OVC tournament to Belmont. As a regular season champion who failed to win their conference tournament, they received an automatic bid to the National Invitation Tournament where they defeated UTEP in the first round and Tulsa in the second round before losing in the quarterfinals to Old Dominion.

On June 8, head coach Steve Prohm resigned to take the same position at Iowa State. He finished at Murray State with a record of 104–29 in four seasons.

== Roster ==
2014–15 Murray State Racers men's basketball team
Players
Coaches

Pos.	#	Name	Height	Weight	Year	Previous school	Hometown
F	0	Wayne Langston	6 ft 7 in (2.01 m)	225 lb (102 kg)	Jr	Dr. Henry A. Wise; McLennan CC	Upper Marlboro, MD
G	1	Cameron Payne	6 ft 2 in (1.88 m)	180 lb (82 kg)	So	Lausanne Collegiate	Memphis, TN
F	2	Jonathan Fairell	6 ft 7 in (2.01 m)	265 lb (120 kg)	Sr	Carol City; Indian River JC	Miami, FL
F	4	Jarvis Williams	6 ft 8 in (2.03 m)	215 lb (98 kg)	Sr	Wilkinson County; Gordon State JC	Macon, GA
F	12	Tyler Rambo	6 ft 5 in (1.96 m)	220 lb (100 kg)	RS Jr	Christian Life Academy	Grandview, MO
G	12	Jeff Martin	5 ft 11 in (1.8 m)	155 lb (70 kg)	So	Seven Lakes	Katy, TX
G	22	T. J. Sapp	6 ft 3 in (1.91 m)	190 lb (86 kg)	RS Sr	Northeast; Clemson	Fort Lauderdale, FL
G	23	Justin Seymour	6 ft 3 in (1.91 m)	210 lb (95 kg)	RS So	Wheeler; Utah	Atlanta, GA
G	24	Kedrick Flomo	6 ft 1 in (1.85 m)	180 lb (82 kg)	Fr	North Forsyth	Winston-Salem, NC
F	31	Jeffery Moss	6 ft 4 in (1.93 m)	188 lb (85 kg)	Jr	Bob Jones	Madison, AL
F	33	Gee McGhee	6 ft 4 in (1.93 m)	210 lb (95 kg)	RS Jr	Redemptorist; Chattanooga	Baton Rouge, LA
F	34	Terron Gilmore	6 ft 7 in (2.01 m)	230 lb (104 kg)	Jr	Callaway	Jackson, MS
G	–	Damarcus Croaker (redshirt)	6 ft 2 in (1.88 m)	185 lb (84 kg)	Jr	Jones; Texas	Orlando, FL

Head coach

- Steve Prohm (Alabama)

Assistant coach(es)

- William Small (Belhaven)
- Matt McMahon (Appalachian State)
- James Kane (Florida)

Legend

- (C) Team captain
- (S) Suspended
- (I) Ineligible
- (W) Walk-on
- Injured
- Current redshirt

Roster

== Schedule ==
Date time, TV	Rank^{#}	Opponent^{#}	Result	Record	Site (attendance) city, state
Exhibition
11/06/2014*; 7:00 pm		Freed–Hardeman	W 74–42		CFSB Center (2,462); Murray, KY
Regular season
11/14/2014*; 7:00 pm		Houston	L 74–77	0–1	CFSB Center (5,056); Murray, KY
11/18/2014*; 7:00 pm		at Middle Tennessee	W 68–49	1–1	Murphy Center (4,024); Murfreesboro, TN
11/20/2014*; 7:00 pm		Brescia	W 89–56	2–1	CFSB Center (3,497); Murray, KY
11/24/2014*; 6:00 pm, FS1		at Xavier	L 62–89	2–2	Cintas Center (9,446); Cincinnati, OH
11/28/2014*; 7:30 pm		vs. Portland; Challenge in Music City	L 61–64	2–3	Nashville Municipal Auditorium (N/A); Nashville, TN
11/29/2014*; 7:30 pm		vs. Valparaiso; Challenge in Music City	L 58–93	2–4	Nashville Municipal Auditorium (N/A); Nashville, TN
11/30/2014*; 3:30 pm		vs. Drake; Challenge in Music City	W 68–59	3–4	Nashville Municipal Auditorium (504); Nashville, TN
12/03/2014*; 7:00 pm		Bethel (TN)	W 102–66	4–4	CFSB Center (3,283); Murray, KY
12/06/2014*; 7:00 pm		WKU	W 93–81	5–4	CFSB Center (5,312); Murray, KY
12/13/2014*; 1:00 pm		at Evansville	W 81–79	6–4	Ford Center (5,083); Evansville, IN
12/17/2014*; 7:00 pm		Alcorn State	W 94–56	7–4	CFSB Center (2,717); Murray, KY
12/20/2014*; 3:00 pm		Illinois State	W 89–77	8–4	CFSB Center (2,979); Murray, KY
12/22/2014*; 7:00 pm		at Southern Illinois	W 83–71	9–4	SIU Arena (5,511); Carbondale, IL
12/30/2014*; 7:00 pm		Alabama A&M	W 76–39	10–4	CFSB Center (3,039); Murray, KY
01/03/2015; 6:30 pm		at Morehead State	W 66–57	11–4 (1–0)	Ellis Johnson Arena (4,247); Morehead, KY
01/08/2015; 7:30 pm		at Tennessee Tech	W 83–67	12–4 (2–0)	Eblen Center (1,683); Cookeville, TN
01/11/2015; 5:00 pm		at Jacksonville State	W 84–57	13–4 (3–0)	Pete Mathews Coliseum (3,196); Jacksonville, AL
01/15/2015; 8:00 pm, ESPNU		Belmont	W 92–77	14–4 (4–0)	CFSB Center (5,960); Murray, KY
01/17/2015; 7:00 pm		Tennessee State	W 91–72	15–4 (5–0)	CFSB Center (5,484); Murray, KY
01/22/2015; 8:00 pm, CBSSN		at Eastern Illinois	W 77–62	16–4 (6–0)	Lantz Arena (4,542); Charleston, IL
01/24/2015; 7:00 pm		at SIU Edwardsville	W 60–54	17–4 (7–0)	Vadalabene Center (3,145); Edwardsville, IL
01/29/2015; 8:00 pm, ESPNU		Eastern Kentucky	W 85–78 ^{OT}	18–4 (8–0)	CFSB Center (5,295); Murray, KY
01/31/2015; 7:00 pm		UT Martin	W 65–62	19–4 (9–0)	CFSB Center (6,302); Murray, KY
02/05/2015; 7:00 pm		Southeast Missouri State	W 82–72	20–4 (10–0)	CFSB Center (4,184); Murray, KY
02/07/2015; 7:00 pm		at Austin Peay	W 82–72	21–4 (11–0)	Dunn Center (6,131); Clarksville, TN
02/12/2015; 7:00 pm		SIU Edwardsville	W 78–46	22–4 (12–0)	CFSB Center (5,914); Murray, KY
02/14/2015; 6:00 pm		at Southeast Missouri State	W 94–92 ^{OT}	23–4 (13–0)	Show Me Center (3,218); Cape Girardeau, MO
02/21/2015; 1:00 pm, CBSSN		Austin Peay	W 89–54	24–4 (14–0)	CFSB Center (5,952); Murray, KY
02/26/2015; 7:00 pm		Eastern Illinois	W 65–57	25–4 (15–0)	CFSB Center (5,961); Murray, KY
02/28/2015; 6:00 pm		at UT Martin	W 73–67	26–4 (16–0)	Skyhawk Arena (5,000); Martin, TN
Ohio Valley tournament
03/06/2015; 6:30 pm, ESPNU	No. 25	vs. Morehead State; Semifinals	W 80–77	27–4	Nashville Municipal Auditorium (3,753); Nashville, TN
03/07/2015; 6:00 pm, ESPN2	No. 25	vs. Belmont; Championship game	L 87–88	27–5	Nashville Municipal Auditorium (5,293); Nashville, TN
NIT
03/17/2015*; 8:00 pm, ESPN2	No. (3)	(6) UTEP; First round	W 81–66	28–5	CFSB Center (3,376); Murray, KY
03/23/2015*; 9:00 pm, ESPN	No. (3)	at (2) Tulsa; Second round	W 83–62	29–5	Reynolds Center (3,440); Tulsa, OK
03/25/2015*; 7:00 pm, ESPN2	No. (3)	at (1) Old Dominion; Quarterfinals	L 69–72	29–6	Ted Constant Convocation Center (8,161); Norfolk, VA
*Non-conference game. (#) Tournament seedings in parentheses. All times are in Central Time. (#) during NIT is seed within region.
