= Andre Payne =

American college basketball coach

Biographical details
- Born: Auburn, Alabama
- Education: Alabama A&M

Coaching career (HC unless noted)
- 1999–2001: Texas College (asst.)
- 2001–2006: Texas College
- 2006–2014: Wiley
- 2014–2019: Mississippi Valley State
- 2020–2023: Denmark Technical

Head coaching record
- Overall: 270–315 (.462)

Andre Payne is an American college basketball coach who previously served as the head coach of the Mississippi Valley State men's team.

== Coaching career ==
Payne got his coaching start at Texas College as an assistant until 2001, when he was elevated to the head coaching position. He stayed in that role until 2006 when he accepted the head coaching and athletics director position at Wiley College, where he led the team to two Red River Athletic Conference tournament titles.

On July 11, 2014 Payne accepted the head coaching position at Mississippi Valley State.

On March 25, 2019, Payne was fired after just winning 31 games overall in 5 seasons at MVSU.

== Head coaching record ==
=== NAIA ===
Record table
| Season | Team | Overall | Conference | Standing | Postseason |
|---|---|---|---|---|---|
Texas College (RRAC) (2001–2006)
| 2001–02 | Texas College | ? | ? | ? | |
| 2002–03 | Texas College | 19–13 | 13–7 | 4th | |
| 2003–04 | Texas College | 13–19 | 12–10 | 5th | |
| 2004–05 | Texas College | 17–14 | 14–8 | 4th | |
| 2005–06 | Texas College | 13–14 | 11–9 | 5th | |
| Texas College: | | 62–60 (.508) | 50–34 (.595) | | |
Wiley (RRAC) (2006–2014)
| 2006–07 | Wiley | 21–10 | 13–5 | 3rd | NAIA Tournament First Round |
| 2007–08 | Wiley | 22–10 | 10–6 | 3rd | |
| 2008–09 | Wiley | 11–20 | 6–12 | 8th | |
| 2009–10 | Wiley | 16–16 | 10–10 | 7th | |
| 2010–11 | Wiley | 17–14 | 13–9 | 5th | |
| 2011–12 | Wiley | 19–11 | 15–9 | 6th | |
| 2012–13 | Wiley | 15–16 | 9–13 | 7th | |
| 2013–14 | Wiley | 25–7 | 13–5 | 4th | NAIA Tournament First Round |
| Wiley: | | 146–104 (.584) | 89–69 (.563) | | |
| Total: | | 239–183 (.566) | | | |
National champion Postseason invitational champion Conference regular season champion Conference regular season and conference tournament champion Division regular season champion Division regular season and conference tournament champion Conference tournament champion

=== NCAA DI ===
Record table
| Season | Team | Overall | Conference | Standing | Postseason |
|---|---|---|---|---|---|
Mississippi Valley State (SWAC) (2014–2019)
| 2014–15 | Mississippi Valley State | 6–26 | 5–13 | 8th | |
| 2015–16 | Mississippi Valley State | 8–27 | 6–12 | 7th | |
| 2016–17 | Mississippi Valley State | 7–25 | 7–11 | 7th | |
| 2017–18 | Mississippi Valley State | 4–28 | 4–14 | 9th | |
| 2018–19 | Mississippi Valley State | 6–26 | 4–14 | T–9th | |
| Mississippi Valley St.: | | 31–132 (.190) | 26–64 (.289) | | |
| Total: | | 31–132 (.190) | | | |
National champion Postseason invitational champion Conference regular season champion Conference regular season and conference tournament champion Division regular season champion Division regular season and conference tournament champion Conference tournament champion
