= 2014–15 Louisiana Tech Bulldogs basketball team =

American college basketball season

2014–15 Louisiana Tech Bulldogs men's basketball

Conference USA regular season champions

NIT, Quarterfinals
- Conference: Conference USA
- Record: 27–9 (15–3 C-USA)
- Head coach: Michael White (4th season)
- Assistant coaches: Dusty May; Jordan Mincy; Darris Nichols
- Home arena: Thomas Assembly Center

2014–15 Conference USA men's basketball standings
	Conf.				Overall
Team	W		L	PCT	W		L	PCT
Louisiana Tech	15	–	3	.833	27	–	9	.750
Old Dominion	13	–	5	.722	27	–	8	.771
UTEP	13	–	5	.722	22	–	11	.667
WKU	12	–	6	.667	20	–	12	.625
UAB †	12	–	6	.667	20	–	16	.556
Middle Tennessee	9	–	9	.500	19	–	17	.528
FIU	8	–	10	.444	16	–	17	.485
UTSA	8	–	10	.444	14	–	16	.467
North Texas	8	–	10	.444	14	–	17	.452
Rice	8	–	10	.444	12	–	20	.375
Charlotte	7	–	11	.389	14	–	18	.438
Marshall	7	–	11	.389	11	–	21	.344
Southern Miss*	4	–	14	.222	9	–	20	.310
Florida Atlantic	2	–	16	.111	9	–	20	.310
† 2015 C-USA Tournament winner *Ineligible for postseason play due to self-imposed postseason ban

The 2014–15 Louisiana Tech Bulldogs basketball team represented Louisiana Tech University during the 2014–15 NCAA Division I men's basketball season. The Bulldogs, led by fourth year head coach Michael White, played their home games at the Thomas Assembly Center and were members of Conference USA. They finished the season 27–9, 15–3 in C-USA play to finish as regular season C-USA champions. They advanced to the semifinals of the C-USA tournament where they lost to UAB. As a regular season conference champion who failed to win their conference tournament, they received an automatic bid to the National Invitation Tournament where they defeated Central Michigan in the first round and Texas A&M in the second round before losing in the quarterfinals to Temple.

== Previous season ==
The Bulldogs finished the season 29–8, 13–3 in C-USA play to finish in a four way tie for the C-USA regular season championship. They advanced to the championship game of the C-USA tournament where they lost to Tulsa. After tiebreakers, they were the #1 seed in the C-USA Tournament, and as a regular season conference champion and overall #1 seed in their conference tournament who failed to win their conference tournament, they received at automatic bid to the National Invitation Tournament where they defeated Iona and Georgia to advance to the quarterfinals where they lost to Florida State.

== Departures ==
Name	Number	Pos.	Height	Weight	Year	Hometown	Notes
Chris Anderson	5	F	6'6"	220	Senior	Muskegon, MI	Graduated
Isaiah Massey	10	F	6'8"	225	RS Junior	McDonough, GA	Transferred to Dalton State College
Stojan Gjuroski	11	F	6'8"	205	RS Junior	Gostivar, Macedonia	Play professionally overseas
Cordarius Johnson	15	G	6'6"	220	Senior	Coushatta, LA	Graduated
Kenyon McNeail	21	G	6'1"	190	Senior	Conway, AR	Graduated
Josh Butler	22	F	6'6"	225	Freshman	Los Angeles, CA	Walk-on didn't return
Jaron Johnson	23	G	6'6"	205	Senior	Tyler, TX	Graduated
Gilbert Talbot	40	F/C	6'10"	290	Sophomore	Houma, LA	Transferred to New Orleans

=== Incoming transfers ===
Name	Number	Pos.	Height	Weight	Year	Hometown	Previous School
Merrill Holden	21	F	6'8"	215	Sophomore	Lincoln, NE	Junior college transfer from Pratt Community College
Qiydar Davis	25	F	6'6"	200	Junior	Atlanta, GA	Junior college transfer from Indian Hills Community College

== Recruiting class of 2014 ==
College recruiting
Name	Hometown	School	Height	Weight	Commit date
Joniah White; C	Grenada, MS	Grenada High School	6 ft 11 in (2.11 m)	220 lb (100 kg)	Oct 29, 2013
Joniah White; C	Recruit ratings: Scout: Rivals: (71)				
Dayon Griffin; SF	Saint Petersburg, FL	Saint Petersburg High School	6 ft 5 in (1.96 m)	185 lb (84 kg)	Oct 18, 2013
Dayon Griffin; SF	Recruit ratings: Scout: Rivals: (NR)				
Jacobi Boykins; SG	Lakeland, FL	Lakeland High School	6 ft 5 in (1.96 m)	160 lb (73 kg)	Sep 9, 2013
Jacobi Boykins; SG	Recruit ratings: Scout: Rivals: (NR)				
Xavian Stapleton; SF	Madison, MS	Madison Central High School	6 ft 6 in (1.98 m)	190 lb (86 kg)	Aug 29, 2013
Xavian Stapleton; SF	Recruit ratings: Scout: Rivals: (NR)				
Branden Sheppard; PF	Shreveport, LA	Huntington High School	6 ft 8 in (2.03 m)	220 lb (100 kg)	Feb 3, 2013
Branden Sheppard; PF	Recruit ratings: Scout: Rivals: (NR)				
Overall recruit ranking:
Note: In many cases, Scout, Rivals, 247Sports, On3, and ESPN may conflict in their listings of height and weight.; In these cases, the average was taken. ESPN grades are on a 100-point scale.; Sources: "2014 Team Ranking". Rivals.

=== Recruiting class of 2015 ===
College recruiting
Name	Hometown	School	Height	Weight	Commit date
Dominic Jackson; SG	Arnaudville, LA	Olney Central College	6 ft 3 in (1.91 m)	165 lb (75 kg)	Jun 29, 2014
Dominic Jackson; SG	Recruit ratings: Scout: Rivals: (JC)				
Overall recruit ranking:
Note: In many cases, Scout, Rivals, 247Sports, On3, and ESPN may conflict in their listings of height and weight.; In these cases, the average was taken. ESPN grades are on a 100-point scale.; Sources: "2015 Team Ranking". Rivals.

== Roster ==
2014–15 Louisiana Tech Bulldogs men's basketball team
Players
Coaches

Pos.	#	Name	Height	Weight	Year	Hometown
G	0	Alex Hamilton	6 ft 4 in (1.93 m)	190 lb (86 kg)	Jr	Chipley, FL
F	1	Michale Kyser	6 ft 10 in (2.08 m)	205 lb (93 kg)	Sr	Lancaster, TX
F	2	Erik McCree	6 ft 8 in (2.03 m)	220 lb (100 kg)	RS So	Orlando, FL
G	3	Raheem Appleby	6 ft 4 in (1.93 m)	160 lb (73 kg)	Sr	Jacksonville, AR
G	4	Speedy Smith	6 ft 3 in (1.91 m)	180 lb (82 kg)	Sr	St. Petersburg, FL
C	5	Joniah White	7 ft 0 in (2.13 m)	210 lb (95 kg)	Fr	Duck Hill, MS
G	10	Dayon Griffin	6 ft 5 in (1.96 m)	188 lb (85 kg)	Fr	St. Petersburg, FL
G	11	Xavian Stapleton	6 ft 6 in (1.98 m)	190 lb (86 kg)	Fr	Flora, MS
G	13	Jacobi Boykins	6 ft 6 in (1.98 m)	160 lb (73 kg)	Fr	St. Petersburg, FL
F	15	Branden Sheppard	6 ft 7 in (2.01 m)	225 lb (102 kg)	Fr	Shreveport, LA
F	21	Merrill Holden	6 ft 8 in (2.03 m)	215 lb (98 kg)	So	Lincoln, NE
G	25	Qiydar Davis	6 ft 6 in (1.98 m)	200 lb (91 kg)	Jr	Atlanta, GA
F	33	Leo Edwards	6 ft 8 in (2.03 m)	225 lb (102 kg)	RS Fr	Detroit, MI

Head coach

- Michael White (Mississippi)

Assistant coach(es)

- Dusty May (Indiana)
- Jordan Mincy (Kent State)
- Darris Nichols (West Virginia)

Legend

- (C) Team captain
- (S) Suspended
- (I) Ineligible
- (W) Walk-on
- Injured
- Current redshirt

Roster

== Schedule ==
Date time, TV	Rank^{#}	Opponent^{#}	Result	Record	Site (attendance) city, state
Non-conference regular season
11/14/2014*; 8:00 pm		at Southern	W 85–76	1–0	F. G. Clark Center (1,104); Baton Rouge, LA
11/17/2014*; 7:00 pm, ESPN3		at Temple; Coaches vs. Cancer Classic	L 75–82	1–1	Liacouras Center (4,237); Philadelphia, PA
11/21/2014*; 7:00 pm, ASN		Morehead State; Coaches vs. Cancer Classic	W 73–64	2–1	Thomas Assembly Center (2,937); Ruston, LA
11/22/2014*; 6:00 pm		American; Coaches vs. Cancer Classic	W 63–44	3–1	Thomas Assembly Center (2,868); Ruston, LA
11/23/2014*; 4:00 pm, ASN		Presbyterian; Coaches vs. Cancer Classic	W 78–46	4–1	Thomas Assembly Center (2,854); Ruston, LA
11/28/2014*; 7:00 pm, ASN		Samford	W 77–64	5–1	Thomas Assembly Center (4,214); Ruston, LA
12/02/2014*; 6:30 pm		at Northwestern State	W 99–88	6–1	Prather Coliseum (2,812); Natchitoches, LA
12/06/2014*; 6:00 pm		Jackson State	W 65–52	7–1	Thomas Assembly Center (4,038); Ruston, LA
12/10/2014*; 7:00 pm		at Louisiana–Lafayette	L 86–94	7–2	Cajundome (3,786); Lafayette, IN
12/14/2014*; 3:00 pm, ESPNU		at Syracuse	L 69–71	7–3	Carrier Dome (19,156); Syracuse, NY
12/18/2014*; 6:30 pm		Nicholls State	W 79–54	8–3	Thomas Assembly Center (3,918); Ruston, LA
12/23/2014*; 6:00 pm, ESPN3		at NC State	L 65–73	8–4	PNC Arena (15,739); Raleigh, NC
12/29/2014*; 6:30 pm		Southern Arkansas	W 74–52	9–4	Thomas Assembly Center (2,629); Ruston, LA
Conference USA regular season
01/03/2015; 7:00 pm		at Southern Miss	W 83–70	10–4 (1–0)	Reed Green Coliseum (3,187); Hattiesburg, MS
01/08/2015; 8:00 pm		at UTEP	W 58–45	11–4 (2–0)	Don Haskins Center (8,653); El Paso, TX
01/10/2015; 2:00 pm		at UTSA	W 84–72	12–4 (3–0)	Convocation Center (1,084); San Antonio, TX
01/15/2015; 7:00 pm, ASN		UAB	W 74–71	13–4 (4–0)	Thomas Assembly Center (3,815); Ruston, LA
01/17/2015; 3:00 pm, FSN		Middle Tennessee	W 75–68	14–4 (5–0)	Thomas Assembly Center (6,214); Ruston, LA
01/22/2015; 7:00 pm		at North Texas	L 66–73	14–5 (5–1)	The Super Pit (3,293); Denton, TX
01/24/2015; 7:00 pm		at Rice	W 58–45	15–5 (6–1)	Tudor Fieldhouse (2,613); Houston, TX
01/29/2015; 6:00 pm, CBSSN		WKU	W 69–56	16–5 (7–1)	Thomas Assembly Center (4,029); Ruston, LA
01/31/2015; 4:30 pm, ASN		Marshall	W 81–57	17–5 (8–1)	Thomas Assembly Center (4,731); Ruston, LA
02/05/2015; 8:00 pm, CBSSN		UAB	L 60–80	17–6 (8–2)	Bartow Arena (4,068); Birmingham, AL
02/07/2015; 7:00 pm, ASN		at Middle Tennessee	W 73–62	18–6 (9–2)	Murphy Center (4,986); Murfreesboro, TN
02/12/2015; 6:30 pm		Florida Atlantic	W 65–54	19–6 (10–2)	Thomas Assembly Center (3,412); Ruston, LA
02/14/2015; 6:00 pm		FIU	W 75–42	20–6 (11–2)	Thomas Assembly Center (3,314); Ruston, LA
02/19/2015; 6:00 pm, CBSSN		at Charlotte	W 83–82 ^{OT}	21–6 (12–2)	Dale F. Halton Arena (4,078); Charlotte, NC
02/21/2015; 2:00 pm, ASN		at Old Dominion	L 53–72	21–7 (12–3)	Ted Constant Convocation Center (8,019); Norfolk, VA
02/26/2015; 7:00 pm, FS1		UTEP	W 77–60	22–7 (13–3)	Thomas Assembly Center (5,126); Ruston, LA
02/28/2015; 6:00 pm, FS1		UTSA	W 76–66	23–7 (14–3)	Thomas Assembly Center (5,328); Ruston, LA
03/05/2015; 7:00 pm, CBSSN		Southern Miss	W 72–61	24–7 (15–3)	Thomas Assembly Center (5,805); Ruston, LA
Conference USA tournament
03/12/2015; 8:30 pm, ASN		vs. Rice; Quarterfinals	W 70–64	25–7	Birmingham–Jefferson Convention Complex (6,922); Birmingham, AL
03/13/2015; 5:30 pm, CBSSN		vs. UAB; Semifinals	L 62–72 ^{OT}	25–8	Birmingham–Jefferson Convention Complex (6,429); Birmingham, AL
National Invitation tournament
03/17/2015*; 6:30 pm, ESPN3	No. (3)	(6) Central Michigan; First round	W 89–79	26–8	Thomas Assembly Center (6,904); Ruston, LA
03/23/2015*; 6:00 pm, ESPN	No. (3)	at (2) Texas A&M; Second round	W 84–72	27–8	Reed Arena (3,859); College Station, TX
03/25/2015*; 9:00 pm, ESPN2	No. (3)	at (1) Temple; Quarterfinals	L 59–77	27–9	Liacouras Center (3,906); Philadelphia, PA
*Non-conference game. ^{#}Rankings from AP Poll. (#) Tournament seedings in parentheses. All times are in Central Time. (#) during NIT is seed within region.
