= 2014–15 Middle Tennessee Blue Raiders men's basketball team =

American college basketball season

2014–15 Middle Tennessee Blue Raiders men's basketball

CIT, First round
- Conference: Conference USA
- Record: 19–17 (9–9 C-USA)
- Head coach: Kermit Davis (13th season)
- Assistant coaches: Greg Grensing; Win Case; Ronnie Hamilton
- Home arena: Murphy Center

2014–15 Conference USA men's basketball standings
	Conf.				Overall
Team	W		L	PCT	W		L	PCT
Louisiana Tech	15	–	3	.833	27	–	9	.750
Old Dominion	13	–	5	.722	27	–	8	.771
UTEP	13	–	5	.722	22	–	11	.667
WKU	12	–	6	.667	20	–	12	.625
UAB †	12	–	6	.667	20	–	16	.556
Middle Tennessee	9	–	9	.500	19	–	17	.528
FIU	8	–	10	.444	16	–	17	.485
UTSA	8	–	10	.444	14	–	16	.467
North Texas	8	–	10	.444	14	–	17	.452
Rice	8	–	10	.444	12	–	20	.375
Charlotte	7	–	11	.389	14	–	18	.438
Marshall	7	–	11	.389	11	–	21	.344
Southern Miss*	4	–	14	.222	9	–	20	.310
Florida Atlantic	2	–	16	.111	9	–	20	.310
† 2015 C-USA Tournament winner *Ineligible for postseason play due to self-imposed postseason ban

The 2014–15 Middle Tennessee Blue Raiders men's basketball team represented Middle Tennessee State University during the 2014–15 NCAA Division I men's basketball season. The Blue Raiders, led by 13th-year head coach Kermit Davis, played their home games at the Murphy Center and were members of Conference USA. They finished the season 19–17, 9–9 in C-USA play to finish in sixth place. They advanced to the championship game of the C-USA tournament, where they lost to UAB. They were invited to the CollegeInsider.com Tournament, where they lost in the first round to Kent State.

== Previous season ==
The Blue Raiders finished the season 24–9, 13–3 in C-USA play to finish in a four-way tie for the C-USA regular season championship. They advanced to the semifinals of the C-USA tournament, where they lost to Tulsa. Despite their 24 wins and conference title, they did not participate in a post-season tournament.

== Departures ==
Name	Number	Pos.	Height	Weight	Year	Hometown	Notes
Zane Gibson	0	G	6'2"	183	Senior	Chattanooga, TN	Graduated
Neiko Hunter	1	F	6'7"	221	Senior	Eutaw, AL	Graduated
Tweety Knight	5	G	6'1"	190	Senior	Rentz, GA	Graduated
Tharone Chilton	11	G	6'2"	160	Junior	Tulsa, OK	Transferred to Oklahoma City
Shawn Jones	12	F	6'8"	236	Senior	Hialeah, FL	Graduated
Blake Johnson	13	G	5'10"	160	RS freshman	Memphis, TN	Left the team
Ronald Ross	15	G	6'3"	215	Junior	Indianapolis, IN	Transferred to Minnesota State–Mankato
Torin Walker	21	C	6'11"	240	Senior	Columbus, GA	Graduated
Kerry Hammonds II	24	G/F	6'5"	210	Senior	Murfreesboro, TN	Graduated

== Recruiting class of 2014 ==
College recruiting
Name	Hometown	School	Height	Weight	Commit date
JaQuel Richmond; PG	Greensboro, NC	Wesleyan Christian Academy	6 ft 1 in (1.85 m)	170 lb (77 kg)	May 19, 2014
JaQuel Richmond; PG	Recruit ratings: Scout: Rivals: (75)				
Ed Simpson; SG	Ocean Springs, MS	Saint Martin High School	6 ft 3 in (1.91 m)	185 lb (84 kg)	Nov 16, 2013
Ed Simpson; SG	Recruit ratings: Scout: Rivals: (NR)				
Jacob Ivory; PG	Jackson, MS	Murrah High School	6 ft 0 in (1.83 m)	160 lb (73 kg)	Sep 6, 2013
Jacob Ivory; PG	Recruit ratings: Scout: Rivals: (NR)				
Giddy Potts; SG	Athens, AL	Athens High School	6 ft 2 in (1.88 m)	210 lb (95 kg)	Mar 6, 2014
Giddy Potts; SG	Recruit ratings: Scout: Rivals: (NR)				
Brendan Boyle; PG	Montverde, FL	Montverde Academy	6 ft 1 in (1.85 m)	172 lb (78 kg)	May 13, 2014
Brendan Boyle; PG	Recruit ratings: Scout: Rivals: (NR)				
Overall recruit ranking:
Note: In many cases, Scout, Rivals, 247Sports, On3, and ESPN may conflict in their listings of height and weight.; In these cases, the average was taken. ESPN grades are on a 100-point scale.; Sources: "2014 Team Ranking". Rivals.

=== Incoming transfers ===
Name	Number	Pos.	Height	Weight	Year	Hometown	Previous school
Darnell Harris	0	F	6'8"	220	Junior	Milwaukee, WI	Junior college transfer from Northwest Florida State College
DeVante Jones	1	G	5'10"	165	Junior	Chicago, IL	Junior college transfer from Southwest Tennessee Community College
Perrin Buford	2	G	6'7"	205	Junior	Decatur, AL	Junior college transfer from Southwest Tennessee Community College
Xavier Habersham	4	F	6'6"	200	Junior	Dublin, GA	Junior college transfer from Hill College

== Roster ==
2014–15 Middle Tennessee Blue Raiders men's basketball team
Players
Coaches

Pos.	#	Name	Height	Weight	Year	Previous school	Hometown
F	0	Darnell Harris	6 ft 8 in (2.03 m)	220 lb (100 kg)	Jr	Hamilton; Northwest Florida State	Milwaukee, WI
G	1	DeVante Jones	5 ft 10 in (1.78 m)	160 lb (73 kg)	Jr	Orr Academy; Southwest Tennessee State	Chicago, IL
G/F	2	Perrin Buford	6 ft 6 in (1.98 m)	212 lb (96 kg)	Jr	Hillcrest; Southwest Tennessee State	Decatur, AL
F	3	Joshua Phillips	6 ft 8 in (2.03 m)	230 lb (104 kg)	So	Pope John Paul II	Hendersonville, TN
F	4	Xavier Haberham	6 ft 6 in (1.98 m)	200 lb (91 kg)	Jr	East Laurens; Hill College	Dublin, GA
G	5	Jacob Ivory	5 ft 9 in (1.75 m)	165 lb (75 kg)	Fr	East Murrah	Jackson, MS
G	10	Jaquawn Raymond	6 ft 4 in (1.93 m)	200 lb (91 kg)	RS Jr	Statesboro; North Carolina State	Statesboro, GA
G	11	Edward Simpson, Jr.	6 ft 2 in (1.88 m)	190 lb (86 kg)	Fr	St. Martin	Ocean Springs, MS
G	14	Andrew Rogan	6 ft 3 in (1.91 m)	170 lb (77 kg)	Fr	Blackman	Murfreesboro, TN
G	15	JaQuel Richmond	6 ft 1 in (1.85 m)	180 lb (82 kg)	Fr	Wesleyan Christian Academy	Greensboro, NC
G	20	Giddy Potts	6 ft 2 in (1.88 m)	220 lb (100 kg)	Fr	Athens	Athens, AL
G	23	Marcus Tarrance	6 ft 6 in (1.98 m)	210 lb (95 kg)	Sr	Kingsbury; Eastern Oklahoma State College	Memphis, TN
F	30	Reggie Upshaw Jr.	6 ft 7 in (2.01 m)	222 lb (101 kg)	So	Baylor School	Chattanooga, TN
G	32	Gavin Gibson	6 ft 4 in (1.93 m)	200 lb (91 kg)	Jr	Baylor School	Chattanooga, TN
F	42	Jacquez Rozier	6 ft 7 in (2.01 m)	220 lb (100 kg)	Sr	Burke County	Waynesboro, GA

Head coach

- Kermit Davis (Purdue)

Assistant coach(es)

- Greg Grensing (Texas State)
- Win Case (Oklahoma City)
- Ronnie Hamilton (UNC Pembroke)

Legend

- (C) Team captain
- (S) Suspended
- (I) Ineligible
- (W) Walk-on
- Injured
- Current redshirt

Roster

== Schedule ==
Date time, TV	Opponent	Result	Record	Site (attendance) city, state
Exhibition
11/10/2014*; 7:30 pm	Martin Methodist	L 67–76		Murphy Center; Murfreesboro, TN
Regular season
11/14/2014*; 7:00 pm	Ohio Valley	W 77–60	1–0	Murphy Center (3,381); Murfreesboro, TN
11/18/2014*; 7:00 pm	Murray State	L 49–68	1–1	Murphy Center (4,024); Murfreesboro, TN
11/22/2014*; 3:30 pm	Southern; Emerald Coast Classic First Round	W 66–48	2–1	Murphy Center (4,092); Murfreesboro, TN
11/25/2014*; 7:00 pm	Northern Arizona; Emerald Coast Classic Second Round	W 65–53	3–1	Murphy Center (3,806); Murfreesboro, TN
11/28/2014*; 5:00 pm	vs. Cincinnati; Emerald Coast Classic Third Round	L 51–69	3–2	The Arena at NWFSC (1,200); Niceville, FL
11/29/2014*; 5:00 pm	vs. No. 23 Creighton; Emerald Coast Classic 3rd place game	L 47–57	3–3	The Arena at NWFSC (1,215); Niceville, FL
12/02/2014*; 7:00 pm, ASN	at Belmont	L 59–63	3–4	Curb Event Center (1,608); Nashville, TN
12/06/2014*; 1:05 pm	at South Alabama	W 68–67 ^{OT}	4–4	Mitchell Center (1,326); Mobile, AL
12/13/2014*; 6:00 pm	at Akron	W 62–61	5–4	James A. Rhodes Arena (2,714); Akron, OH
12/16/2014*; 8:00 pm, ESPNU	at Oklahoma State	L 44–68	5–5	Gallagher-Iba Arena (5,217); Stillwater, OK
12/19/2014*; 7:00 pm, ASN	Chattanooga	W 68–58	6–5	Murphy Center (4,017); Murfreesboro, TN
12/21/2014*; 2:00 pm, ASN	Tennessee State	W 65–47	7–5	Murphy Center (3,672); Murfreesboro, TN
12/29/2014*; 8:00 pm, SECN	at Auburn	L 48–64	7–6	Auburn Arena (6,752); Auburn, AL
01/04/2015; 2:00 pm	UAB	L 49–54	7–7 (0–1)	Murphy Center (3,605); Murfreesboro, TN
01/08/2015; 7:00 pm	FIU	W 65–52	8–7 (1–1)	Murphy Center (2,587); Murfreesboro, TN
01/10/2015; 7:00 pm	Florida Atlantic	W 82–58	9–7 (2–1)	Murphy Center (2,774); Murfreesboro, TN
01/15/2015; 7:00 pm	at Southern Miss	W 62–61	10–7 (3–1)	Reed Green Coliseum (3,191); Hattiesburg, MS
01/17/2015; 3:00 pm, FSN	at Louisiana Tech	L 68–75	10–8 (3–2)	Thomas Assembly Center (6,214); Ruston, LA
01/22/2015; 7:00 pm, ASN	Old Dominion	W 68–58 ^{OT}	11–8 (4–2)	Murphy Center (4,887); Murfreesboro, TN
01/24/2015; 5:00 pm	Charlotte	W 72–69	12–8 (5–2)	Murphy Center (4,839); Murfreesboro, TN
01/29/2015; 7:00 pm, ASN	at UTSA	L 58–69	12–9 (5–3)	Convocation Center (1,005); San Antonio, TX
01/31/2015; 8:00 pm	at UTEP	L 70–83	12–10 (5–4)	Don Haskins Center (8,281); El Paso, TX
02/05/2015; 7:00 pm	Southern Miss	W 61–51	13–10 (6–4)	Murphy Center (4,012); Murfreesboro, TN
02/07/2015; 7:00 pm, ASN	Louisiana Tech	L 62–73	13–11 (6–5)	Murphy Center (4,986); Murfreesboro, TN
02/12/2015; 7:00 pm	at Rice	L 68–71 ^{2OT}	13–12 (6–6)	Tudor Fieldhouse (1,341); Houston, TX
02/14/2015; 7:00 pm, ASN	at North Texas	L 56–57	13–13 (6–7)	The Super Pit (1,946); Denton, TX
02/19/2015; 4:00 pm	Marshall	W 90–51	14–13 (7–7)	Murphy Center (5,101); Murfreesboro, TN
02/22/2015; 12:00 pm, FSN	WKU	W 68–66	15–13 (8–7)	Murphy Center (5,227); Murfreesboro, TN
02/28/2015; 2:00 pm, ASN	at UAB	L 95–100 ^{3OT}	15–14 (8–8)	Bartow Arena (4,761); Birmingham, AL
03/05/2015; 7:30 pm	at FIU	L 54–59	15–15 (8–9)	FIU Arena (1,041); Miami, FL
03/07/2015; 6:00 pm	at Florida Atlantic	W 77–54	16–15 (9–9)	FAU Arena (1,021); Boca Raton, FL
Conference USA tournament
03/11/2015; 2:30 pm, ASN	vs. Charlotte; First round	W 63–60	17–15	BJCC (4,661); Birmingham, AL
03/12/2015; 2:30 pm, ASN	vs. Old Dominion; Quarterfinals	W 59–52	18–15	BJCC (4,339); Birmingham, AL
03/13/2015; 3:00 pm, CBSSN	vs. UTEP; Semifinals	W 53–50	19–15	BJCC (6,429); Birmingham, AL
03/14/2015; 2:30 pm, FS1	vs. UAB; Championship Game	L 60–73	19–16	BJCC (8,279); Birmingham, AL
CIT
03/18/2015*; 6:00 pm	Kent State; First round	L 56–68	19–17	Murphy Center (2,782); Murfreesboro, TN
*Non-conference game. ^{#}Rankings from AP Poll. (#) Tournament seedings in parentheses. All times are in Central Time.
