= 2014–15 Alcorn State Braves basketball team =

American college basketball season

2014–15 Alcorn State Braves men's basketball
- Conference: Southwestern Athletic Conference
- Record: 6–26 (4–14 SWAC)
- Head coach: Luther Riley (4th season)
- Assistant coaches: James Horton; Shawn Pepp
- Home arena: Davey Whitney Complex

2014–15 SWAC men's basketball standings
	Conf.				Overall
Team	W		L	PCT	W		L	PCT
Texas Southern †	16	–	2	.889	22	–	13	.629
Alabama State*	14	–	4	.778	19	–	10	.655
Southern*	13	–	5	.722	18	–	17	.514
Prairie View A&M	12	–	6	.667	15	–	18	.455
Arkansas–Pine Bluff*	9	–	9	.500	12	–	20	.375
Jackson State	9	–	9	.500	11	–	21	.344
Alabama A&M	8	–	10	.444	9	–	20	.310
Mississippi Valley State	5	–	13	.278	6	–	26	.188
Alcorn State	4	–	14	.222	6	–	26	.188
Grambling State	0	–	18	.000	2	–	27	.069
† 2015 SWAC tournament winner *ineligible for postseason play due to NCAA violations

The 2014–15 Alcorn State Braves basketball team represented Alcorn State University during the 2014–15 NCAA Division I men's basketball season. The Braves, led by fourth head coach Luther Riley, played their home games at the Davey Whitney Complex and were members of the Southwestern Athletic Conference. They finished the season 6–26, 4–14 in SWAC play to finish in ninth place. They advanced to the quarterfinals of the SWAC tournament where they lost to Texas Southern.

On January 6, head coach Luther Riley took a personal leave of absence. Assistant coach Shawn Pepp led the Braves in Riley's absence. On March 23, it was announced that Riley's expiring contract would not be renewed.

== Roster ==
Number	Name	Position	Height	Weight	Year	Hometown
0	Tyrel Hunt	Forward	6–5	205	Junior	Queens, New York
2	Chris Miller	Guard	6–3	185	Junior	Vicksburg, Mississippi
3	Tamarcio Wilson	Guard	6–2	200	Junior	Lexington, Mississippi
5	Michael Davis	Guard	6–1	175	Junior	Shreveport, Louisiana
10	Devante Hampton	Guard	6–1	175	Sophomore	Memphis, Tennessee
11	Juwan Henderson	Guard	5–9	160	Freshman	Atlanta, Georgia
12	Corey Barnes Jr.	Guard	6–3	175	Freshman	Mount Olive, Mississippi
14	Tavis Gibson	Guard	6–1		Freshman	Chicago, Illinois
15	LeAntwan Luckett	Forward	6–4	184	Junior	Ridgeland, Mississippi
20	Bassel Harfouch	Guard	6–4	205	Junior	Tampa, Florida
21	Xavier Graves	Forward	6–7	230	Junior	Bassfield, Mississippi
23	Keynan Pittman	Forward	6–10	225	Junior	Wilmington, North Carolina
24	Reginald Johnson	Forward	6–5	225	Freshman	Monroe, Louisiana
25	George Gudadze	Forward	6–10	225	Freshman	Durham, North Carolina
30	Marquis Vance	Forward	6–7	225	Sophomore	Lexington, Mississippi
32	Rahkeem Lehaman	Guard	6–4	180	Freshman	Greenwood, Mississippi
35	Octavius Brown	Forward	6–8	210	Senior	Brandon, Mississippi
40	George Thomas	Forward	6–6	210	Sophomore	Clinton, Mississippi
55	Omar Beauperthuy	Forward	6–8	255	Junior	St. Maarten, Netherlands

== Schedule ==
Date time, TV	Opponent	Result	Record	Site (attendance) city, state
Regular season
11/14/2014*; 7:00 pm, no	at California; 2K Sports Classic	L 57–91	0–1	Haas Pavilion (7,212); Berkeley, CA
11/16/2014*; 7:00 pm, no	at No. 10 Texas; 2K Sports Classic	L 53–85	0–2	Frank Erwin Center (8,463); Austin, TX
11/21/2014*; 5:30 pm, no	vs. Hampton; 2K Sports Classic	L 69–82	0–3	Scheels Arena (2,014); Fargo, ND
11/22/2014*; 4:30 pm, no	vs. Kennesaw State; 2K Sports Classic	L 80–83	0–4	Scheels Arena (1,437); Fargo, ND
11/24/2014*; 3:00 pm, no	Dillard	W 95–73	1–4	Davey Whitney Complex (255); Lorman, MS
12/02/2014*; 7:00 pm, no	at Troy	L 51–72	1–5	Trojan Arena (1,136); Troy, AL
12/09/2014*; 8:00 pm, no	at Iowa	L 44–67	1–6	Carver–Hawkeye Arena (12,392); Iowa City, IA
12/13/2014*; 1:00 pm, no	at Ohio	L 55–66	1–7	Convocation Center (5,972); Athens, OH
12/17/2014*; 7:00 pm, no	at Murray State	L 56–94	1–8	CFSB Center (2,717); Murray, KY
12/21/2014*; 7:00 pm, no	at UTEP; Sun Bowl Invitational	L 45–78	1–9	Don Haskins Center (5,790); El Paso, TX
12/22/2014*; 6:00 pm, no	vs. North Dakota State; Sun Bowl Invitational	L 50–61	1–10	Don Haskins Center (6,290); El Paso, TX
12/30/2014*; 3:00 pm, no	Concordia	L 70–79	1–11	Davey Whitney Complex (N/A); Lorman, MS
01/03/2015; 3:00 pm, no	Texas Southern	L 55–72	1–12 (0–1)	Davey Whitney Complex (343); Lorman, MS
01/05/2015; 7:30 pm, no	Prairie View A&M	W 68–62	2–12 (1–1)	Davey Whitney Complex (391); Lorman, MS
01/10/2015; 3:00 pm, no	at Jackson State	L 54–64	2–13 (1–2)	Williams Assembly Center (1,251); Jackson, MS
01/12/2015; 12:00 pm, no	at Grambling State	W 72–70	3–13 (2–2)	Fredrick C. Hobdy Assembly Center (N/A); Grambling, LA
01/17/2015; 5:00 pm, no	Mississippi Valley State	W 87–67	4–13 (3–2)	Davey Whitney Complex (N/A); Lorman, MS
01/19/2015; 7:30 pm, no	Arkansas–Pine Bluff	L 49–54	4–14 (3–3)	Davey Whitney Complex (1,137); Lorman, MS
01/24/2015; 5:00 pm, no	at Alabama State	L 60–84	4–15 (3–4)	Dunn–Oliver Acadome (1,264); Montgomery, AL
01/26/2015; 7:30 pm, no	at Alabama A&M	L 66–78	4–16 (3–5)	Elmore Gymnasium (937); Huntsville, AL
01/31/2015; 3:00 pm, no	Southern	L 56–65	4–17 (3–6)	Davey Whitney Complex (5,093); Lorman, MS
02/07/2015; 3:00 pm, no	Jackson State	L 61–64	4–18 (3–7)	Davey Whitney Complex (N/A); Lorman, MS
2/09/2015; 7:30 pm, no	Grambling State	W 91–77	5–18 (4–7)	Davey Whitney Complex (N/A); Lorman, MS
02/14/2015; 5:00 pm, no	at Mississippi Valley State	L 62–74	5–19 (4–8)	Leflore County Civic Center (N/A); Greenwood, MS
02/17/2015; 7:30 pm, no	at Arkansas–Pine Bluff	L 70–74	5–20 (4–9)	K. L. Johnson Complex (2,893); Pine Bluff, AR
02/21/2015; 3:00 pm, no	Alabama State	L 67–71	5–21 (4–10)	Davey Whitney Complex (N/A); Lorman, MS
02/23/2015; 7:30 pm, no	Alabama A&M	L 69–73	5–22 (4–11)	Davey Whitney Complex (N/A); Lorman, MS
02/28/2015; 5:00 pm, no	at Southern	L 63–71	5–23 (4–12)	F. G. Clark Center (1,814); Baton Rouge, LA
03/05/2015; 5:00 pm, no	at Texas Southern	L 73–94	5–24 (4–13)	Health and Physical Education Arena (1,024); Houston, TX
03/07/2015; 5:00 pm, no	at Prairie View A&M	L 80–83	5–25 (4–14)	William J. Nicks Building (1,256); Prairie View, TX
SWAC tournament
03/10/2015; 9:30 pm, no	vs. Grambling State; First Round	W 66–52	6–25	Toyota Center (N/A); Houston, TX
03/11/2015; 9:30 pm, no	vs. Texas Southern; Quarterfinals	L 74–95	6–26	Toyota Center (N/A); Houston, TX
*Non-conference game. ^{#}Rankings from AP Poll. (#) Tournament seedings in parentheses. All times are in Central Time.
