= 2014–15 Delaware State Hornets men's basketball team =

American college basketball season

2014–15 Delaware State Hornets men's basketball

CBI, First round
- Conference: Mid-Eastern Athletic Conference
- Record: 18–18 (9–7 MEAC)
- Head coach: Keith Walker (1st season)
- Assistant coaches: Keith Johnson; Kevin Washington; Alex Stone
- Home arena: Memorial Hall

2014–15 MEAC men's basketball standings
	Conf.				Overall
Team	W		L	PCT	W		L	PCT
North Carolina Central	16	–	0	1.000	25	–	8	.758
Norfolk State	12	–	4	.750	20	–	14	.588
Maryland Eastern Shore	11	–	5	.688	18	–	15	.545
Howard	10	–	6	.625	16	–	16	.500
Delaware State	9	–	7	.563	18	–	18	.500
Hampton †	8	–	8	.500	17	–	18	.486
South Carolina State	7	–	9	.438	11	–	22	.333
Bethune–Cookman	7	–	9	.438	11	–	21	.344
Coppin State	6	–	10	.375	8	–	23	.258
North Carolina A&T	6	–	10	.375	9	–	23	.281
Morgan State	5	–	11	.313	7	–	24	.226
Savannah State	5	–	11	.313	9	–	22	.290
Florida A&M	2	–	14	.125	2	–	27	.069
† 2015 MEAC tournament winner

The 2014–15 Delaware State Hornets men's basketball team represented Delaware State University during the 2014–15 NCAA Division I men's basketball season. The Hornets, led by first year head coach Keith Walker, played their home games at Memorial Hall and were members of the Mid-Eastern Athletic Conference. They finished the season 18–18, 9–7 in MEAC play to finish in fifth place. They advanced to the championship game of the MEAC tournament where they lost to Hampton. They were invited to the College Basketball Invitational where they lost in the first round to Radford.

In a 104–92 win over Coppin State on March 5, center Kendall Gray scored 33 points and had 30 rebounds. He was the first NCAA Division I player to get 30 rebounds in a game since December 14, 2005.

== Roster ==
Number	Name	Position	Height	Weight	Year	Hometown
0	Quincy Tillinghast	Guard	6–0	160	Freshman	Cincinnati, Ohio
1	Kendall Gray	Center	6–10	240	Senior	Dover, Delaware
2	Kendal Williams	Guard	6–0	160	Senior	Stone Mountain, Georgia
3	Scott Sill	Forward	6–9	215	Sophomore	Windsor, Connecticut
4	Kris Walden	Guard	6–1	180	Junior	Richmond, Virginia
5	Tyshawn Bell	Forward	6–7	215	Senior	Dover, Delaware
10	Kavon Waller	Forward	6–5	210	Freshman	Chester, Virginia
11	DeAndre Haywood	Guard	6–2	200	Sophomore	Paterson, New Jersey
20	Mrdjan Gasevic	Forward/Center	6–7	235	Sophomore	Mladenovac, Serbia
21	Larry Haley	Guard	6–3	190	Junior	Largo, Maryland
22	Aric Dickerson	Guard/Forward	6–6	200	Junior	Chicago, Illinois
23	Jason Owens	Forward	6–6	232	Junior	Seaford, Delaware
25	Artem Tavakalyan	Forward	6–6	210	Freshman	Moscow, Russia
35	Todd Hughes	Guard	6–3	185	Freshman	Smyrna, Delaware
44	Amere May	Guard	6–3	185	Senior	Covert, Michigan
55	Charles Burley	Guard	5–10	185	Senior	Wilmington, Delaware

== Schedule ==
Date time, TV	Opponent	Result	Record	Site (attendance) city, state
Regular season
11/15/2014*; 4:30 pm	at Penn	W 77–75 ^{OT}	1–0	The Palestra (2,535); Philadelphia, PA
11/17/2014*; 7:00 pm	Baptist Bible	W 104–63	2–0	Memorial Hall (1,474); Dover, DE
11/19/2014*; 8:00 pm	at North Texas; Roundball Showcase	L 55–62	2–1	The Super Pit (1,491); Denton, TX
11/21/2014*; 8:00 pm, SECN+	at Arkansas; Roundball Showcase	L 71–99	2–2	Bud Walton Arena (14,740); Fayetteville, AR
11/26/2014*; 7:00 pm	at Iona; Roundball Showcase	L 76–126	2–3	Hynes Athletic Center (1,414); New Rochelle, NY
11/28/2014*; 7:00 pm	at Wake Forest; Roundball Showcase	W 72–65	3–3	LJVM Coliseum (8,054); Winston-Salem, NC
12/02/2014*; 1:00 am	at Hawaiʻi	L 60–75	3–4	Stan Sheriff Center (4,745); Honolulu, HI
12/07/2014*; 12:00 pm	at Delaware	W 66–53	4–4	Bob Carpenter Center (2,020); Newark, DE
12/10/2014*; 7:00 pm	Campbell	L 55–70	4–5	Memorial Hall (878); Dover, DE
12/13/2014*; 2:00 pm	at Rhode Island	L 44–83	4–6	Ryan Center (4,613); Kingston, RI
12/17/2014*; 2:00 pm	at St. Francis Brooklyn	W 72–64	5–6	Generoso Pope Athletic Complex (535); Brooklyn, NY
12/20/2014*; 3:00 pm, P12N	at Oregon	L 70–83	5–7	Matthew Knight Arena (5,530); Eugene, OR
12/28/2014*; 3:00 pm, ESPN3	at Temple	L 56–66	5–8	Liacouras Center (4,642); Philadelphia, PA
01/05/2015*; 7:00 pm	Cheyney	W 90–68	6–8	Memorial Hall (918); Dover, DE
01/10/2015; 4:00 pm	Morgan State	L 69–73	6–9 (0–1)	Memorial Hall (975); Dover, DE
01/12/2015; 7:00 pm	at Howard	W 79–76	7–9 (1–1)	Burr Gymnasium (1,665); Washington, D.C.
01/17/2015; 4:00 pm	South Carolina State	W 60–49	8–9 (2–1)	Memorial Hall (1,549); Dover, DE
01/19/2015; 4:00 pm	Savannah State	W 59–50	9–9 (3–1)	Memorial Hall (1,367); Dover, DE
01/24/2015; 7:30 pm, ESPN3	at North Carolina A&T	W 67–52	10–9 (4–1)	Corbett Sports Center (1,040); Greensboro, NC
01/26/2015; 4:00 pm, ESPNU	at North Carolina Central	L 54–55	10–10 (4–2)	McLendon–McDougald Gymnasium (3,019); Durham, NC
01/31/2015; 6:00 pm	at South Carolina State	L 74–78	10–11 (4–3)	SHM Memorial Center (915); Orangeburg, SC
02/03/2015*; 7:30 pm	at NJIT	L 51–69	10–12	Fleisher Center (937); Newark, NJ
02/07/2015; 4:00 pm	Bethune-Cookman	L 70–75	10–13 (4–4)	Memorial Hall (1,532); Dover, DE
02/09/2015; 7:30 pm	Florida A&M	W 90–74	11–13 (5–4)	Memorial Hall (1,186); Dover, DE
02/14/2015; 4:00 pm	at Maryland Eastern Shore	W 91–85	12–13 (6–4)	Hytche Athletic Center (5,411); Princess Anne, MD
02/16/2015; 7:30 pm	Coppin State	L 92–96	12–14 (6–5)	Memorial Hall (1,238); Dover, DE
02/21/2015; 6:00 pm	at Hampton	W 74–71	13–14 (7–5)	Hampton Convocation Center (4,391); Hampton, VA
02/23/2015; 8:00 pm	at Norfolk State	L 71–81	13–15 (7–6)	Joseph G. Echols Memorial Hall (2,152); Norfolk, VA
02/28/2015; 4:00 pm	Maryland Eastern Shore	L 65–69	13–16 (7–7)	Memorial Hall (1,738); Dover, DE
03/02/2015; 7:30 pm	Hampton	W 85–75	14–16 (8–7)	Memorial Hall (1,687); Dover, DE
03/05/2015; 7:00 pm	at Coppin State	W 104–92	15–16 (9–7)	Physical Education Complex (538); Baltimore, MD
MEAC tournament
03/09/2015; 6:30 pm, ESPN3	vs. Savannah State; First round	W 64–58	16–16	Norfolk Scope (3,111); Norfolk, VA
03/12/2015; 9:00 pm, ESPN3	vs. Howard; Quarterfinals	W 65–60	17–16	Norfolk Scope (N/A); Norfolk, VA
03/13/2015; 6:00 pm, ESPN3	vs. North Carolina Central; Semifinals	W 63–57	18–16	Norfolk Scope (N/A); Norfolk, VA
03/14/2015; 6:30 pm, ESPN2	vs. Hampton; Championship game	L 61–82	18–17	Norfolk Scope (N/A); Norfolk, VA
College Basketball Invitational
03/18/2015*; 8:00 pm	Radford; First round	L 57–78	18–18	Memorial Hall (1,038); Dover, DE
*Non-conference game. ^{#}Rankings from AP Poll. (#) Tournament seedings in parentheses. All times are in Eastern Time.
