= 2014–15 Savannah State Tigers basketball team =

American college basketball season

2014–15 Savannah State Tigers basketball
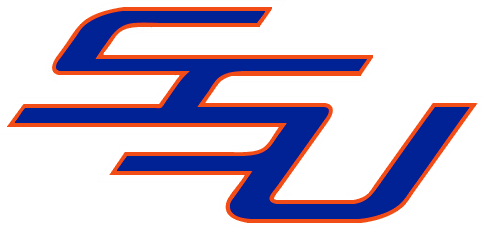
- Conference: Mid-Eastern Athletic Conference
- Record: 6–22, 3 wins vacated (5–11 MEAC)
- Head coach: Horace Broadnax (10th season)
- Assistant coaches: Jay Gibbons; Clyde Wormley; Timothy "Pat" Hardy
- Home arena: Tiger Arena

2014–15 MEAC men's basketball standings
	Conf.				Overall
Team	W		L	PCT	W		L	PCT
North Carolina Central	16	–	0	1.000	25	–	8	.758
Norfolk State	12	–	4	.750	20	–	14	.588
Maryland Eastern Shore	11	–	5	.688	18	–	15	.545
Howard	10	–	6	.625	16	–	16	.500
Delaware State	9	–	7	.563	18	–	18	.500
Hampton †	8	–	8	.500	17	–	18	.486
South Carolina State	7	–	9	.438	11	–	22	.333
Bethune–Cookman	7	–	9	.438	11	–	21	.344
Coppin State	6	–	10	.375	8	–	23	.258
North Carolina A&T	6	–	10	.375	9	–	23	.281
Morgan State	5	–	11	.313	7	–	24	.226
Savannah State	5	–	11	.313	9	–	22	.290
Florida A&M	2	–	14	.125	2	–	27	.069
† 2015 MEAC tournament winner

The 2014–15 Savannah State Tigers basketball team represented Savannah State University during the 2014–15 NCAA Division I men's basketball season. The Tigers, led by tenth year head coach Horace Broadnax, played their home games at Tiger Arena and were members of the Mid-Eastern Athletic Conference. They finished the season 9–22, 5–11 in MEAC play to finish in a tie for 11th place. They lost in the first round of the MEAC tournament to Delaware State.

In 2019, three wins were vacated due to academic certification errors.

== Roster ==
2014–15 Savannah State Tigers men's basketball team
Players
Coaches

Pos.	#	Name	Height	Weight	Year	Hometown
G	00	Jamal Norman	6 ft 5 in (1.96 m)	185 lb (84 kg)	Fr	Savannah, Georgia
G	1	Alante Fenner	6 ft 5 in (1.96 m)	185 lb (84 kg)	So	Lake Wales, Florida
G	2	Khiry White	6 ft 3 in (1.91 m)	180 lb (82 kg)	Sr	Columbus, Georgia
G	3	Whitley Carter	5 ft 9 in (1.75 m)	145 lb (66 kg)	So	Douglasville, Georgia
F	4	Saadig Muhammad	6 ft 7 in (2.01 m)	210 lb (95 kg)	Fr	Savannah, Georgia
F	5	Jarvaris Jenkins	6 ft 5 in (1.96 m)	200 lb (91 kg)	Fr	Deerfield Beach, Florida
G	11	Stephen Wilson	6 ft 1 in (1.85 m)	160 lb (73 kg)	Sr	Jonesboro, Georgia
F	12	Sullivan Hernandez	6 ft 8 in (2.03 m)	195 lb (88 kg)	Fr	Guadeloupe
G	15	Keierre Richards	6 ft 2 in (1.88 m)	190 lb (86 kg)	Sr	Powder Springs, Georgia
G	22	Terel Hall	6 ft 1 in (1.85 m)	185 lb (84 kg)	Jr	Dawson, Georgia
G	30	Karandeep Malhi	6 ft 1 in (1.85 m)	165 lb (75 kg)	Fr	Toronto, Ontario, Canada
C	34	Tyler Hagan	6 ft 7 in (2.01 m)	210 lb (95 kg)	Fr	Effingham, Georgia
G	42	Hikeem Champaigne	6 ft 9 in (2.06 m)	216 lb (98 kg)	Sr	Charleston, South Carolina
F	55	Brian Pearson	6 ft 7 in (2.01 m)	230 lb (104 kg)	Jr	Monroe, Georgia

Head coach

- Horace Broadnax (Georgetown)

Assistant coach(es)

- Jay Gibbons (Florida Southern)
- Clyde Wormley (The Citadel)
- Timothy "Pat" Hardy (Savannah State)

Legend

- (C) Team captain
- (S) Suspended
- (I) Ineligible
- (W) Walk-on
- Injured
- Current redshirt

Roster
Last update: 2014-11-18

== Schedule ==
Date time, TV	Opponent	Result	Record	Site (attendance) city, state
Exhibition
11/06/2014*; 8:00 pm	Armstrong Atlantic State	W 66–51		Tiger Arena (4,650); Savannah, Georgia
11/10/2014*; 7:00 pm	West Georgia	L 65–71		Tiger Arena (1,820); Savannah, Georgia
Non-conference regular season
11/14/2014*; 7:00 pm	at Eastern Kentucky	L 53–76	0–1	McBrayer Arena (3,950); Richmond, Kentucky
11/16/2014*; 4:00 pm	at Marshall; Global Sports Showcase	L 47–66	0–2	Cam Henderson Center (4,789); Huntington, West Virginia
11/20/2014*; 8:00 pm	Winthrop	W 59–58	1–2	Tiger Arena (3,010); Savannah, Georgia
11/22/2014*; 4:00 pm	Cleveland State; Global Sports Hoops Showcase	W 87–83 ^{OT}	2–2	Tiger Arena (1,730); Savannah, Georgia
11/24/2014*; 7:00 pm, ESPN3	at No. 6 Louisville; Global Sports Showcase	L 26–87	2–3	KFC Yum! Center (19,514); Louisville, Kentucky
11/28/2014*; 6:00 pm	at Jacksonville State; Global Sports Showcase	L 71–74	2–4	Pete Mathews Coliseum (709); Jacksonville, Alabama
12/1/2014*; 7:00 pm	at Winthrop	L 47–68	2–5	Winthrop Coliseum (804); Rock Hill, South Carolina
12/04/2014*; 8:00 pm	Middle Georgia	W 75–62	3–5	Tiger Arena (2,430); Savannah, Georgia
12/06/2014*; 7:30 pm, BTN	at Indiana	L 49–95	3–6	Assembly Hall (17,472); Bloomington, Indiana
12/08/2014*; 7:00 pm, ESPN3	at No. 20 Miami (FL)	L 39–70	3–7	BankUnited Center (4,274); Coral Gables, Florida
12/14/2014*; 4:00 pm, FSMW	at Kansas State	L 53–73	3–8	Bramlage Coliseum (12,266); Manhattan, Kansas
12/16/2014*; 6:00 pm, ESPN3	at Tulane	L 67–75	3–9	Devlin Fieldhouse (1,003); New Orleans
01/03/2015*; 5:00 pm, SECN	at LSU	L 59–75	3–10	Pete Maravich Assembly Center (7,647); Baton Rouge, Louisiana
01/06/2015*; 8:00 pm	Allen	W 67–49	4–10	Tiger Arena (820); Savannah, Georgia
MEAC regular season
01/10/2015; 6:00 pm	at North Carolina A&T	L 47–68	4–11 (0–1)	Corbett Sports Center (932); Greensboro, North Carolina
01/12/2015; 8:00 pm	at North Carolina Central	L 40–58	4–12 (0–2)	McLendon–McDougald Gymnasium (1,479); Durham, North Carolina
01/17/2015; 4:00 pm	at Maryland Eastern Shore	L 57–87	4–13 (0–3)	Hytche Athletic Center (930); Princess Anne, Maryland
01/19/2015; 7:30 pm	at Delaware State	L 50–59	4–14 (0–4)	Memorial Hall (1,367); Dover, Delaware
01/24/2015; 6:00 pm	Hampton	W 68–66	5–14 (1–4)	Tiger Arena (2,755); Savannah, Georgia
01/26/2015; 8:00 pm	Norfolk State	L 54–70	5–15 (1–5)	Tiger Arena (2,390); Savannah, Georgia
01/31/2015; 6:00 pm	North Carolina A&T	L 59–62	5–16 (1–6)	Tiger Arena (1,755); Savannah, Georgia
02/07/2015; 4:00 pm	at Morgan State	L 57–67	5–17 (1–7)	Talmadge L. Hill Field House (1,005); Baltimore
02/09/2015; 7:30 pm	at Coppin State	W 73–70	6–17 (2–7)	Physical Education Complex (905); Baltimore
02/14/2015; 6:00 pm	South Carolina State	L 53–56	6–18 (2–8)	Tiger Arena (N/A); Savannah, Georgia
2/21/2015; 6:00 pm	Howard	L 48–50	6–19 (2–9)	Tiger Arena (1,820); Savannah, Georgia
02/23/2015; 8:00 pm	Florida A&M	W 63–52	7–19 (3–9)	Tiger Arena (1,210); Savannah, Georgia
02/25/2015; 7:00 pm	Bethune-Cookman	W 58–49	8–19 (4–9)	Tiger Arena (915); Savannah, Georgia
02/28/2015; 6:00 pm	at South Carolina State	W 68–57	9–19 (5–9)	SHM Memorial Center (551); Orangeburg, South Carolina
03/02/2015; 8:00 pm	North Carolina Central	L 49–62	9–20 (5–10)	Tiger Arena (1,430); Savannah, Georgia
03/06/2015; 6:00 pm	at Florida A&M	L 57–64	9–21 (5–11)	Teaching Gym (479); Tallahassee, Florida
MEAC tournament
03/09/2015; 6:30 pm	vs. Delaware State; First round	L 58–64	9–22	Norfolk Scope; Norfolk, Virginia
*Non-conference game. ^{#}Rankings from AP Poll. (#) Tournament seedings in parentheses. All times are in Eastern Time.
