= 2014–15 South Carolina State Bulldogs basketball team =

American college basketball season

2014–15 South Carolina State Bulldogs men's basketball
- Conference: Mid-Eastern Athletic Conference
- Record: 11–22 (7–9 MEAC)
- Head coach: Murray Garvin (2nd season)
- Assistant coaches: Kevin Spencer; Rio Pitt; Travis Garrett
- Home arena: SHM Memorial Center

2014–15 MEAC men's basketball standings
	Conf.				Overall
Team	W		L	PCT	W		L	PCT
North Carolina Central	16	–	0	1.000	25	–	8	.758
Norfolk State	12	–	4	.750	20	–	14	.588
Maryland Eastern Shore	11	–	5	.688	18	–	15	.545
Howard	10	–	6	.625	16	–	16	.500
Delaware State	9	–	7	.563	18	–	18	.500
Hampton †	8	–	8	.500	17	–	18	.486
South Carolina State	7	–	9	.438	11	–	22	.333
Bethune–Cookman	7	–	9	.438	11	–	21	.344
Coppin State	6	–	10	.375	8	–	23	.258
North Carolina A&T	6	–	10	.375	9	–	23	.281
Morgan State	5	–	11	.313	7	–	24	.226
Savannah State	5	–	11	.313	9	–	22	.290
Florida A&M	2	–	14	.125	2	–	27	.069
† 2015 MEAC tournament winner

The 2014–15 South Carolina State Bulldogs basketball team represented South Carolina State University during the 2014–15 NCAA Division I men's basketball season. The Bulldogs, led by second year head coach Murray Garvin, played their home games at the SHM Memorial Center and were members of the Mid-Eastern Athletic Conference. They finished the season 11–22, 7–9 in MEAC play to finish in a tie for seventh place. They advanced to the quarterfinals of the MEAC tournament where they lost to Norfolk State.

== Roster ==
Number	Name	Position	Height	Weight	Year	Hometown
0	Jalen White	Guard	6–1	185	Freshman	Charlotte, North Carolina
2	Theron Stephens	Guard	5–9	165	Senior	Reading, Pennsylvania
3	Jordan Smith	Guard	6–3	170	Sophomore	Palmetto, Florida
4	Patrick Kirksey	Forward	6–5	200	Freshman	Simpsonville, South Carolina
5	Adama Adams	Guard	6–1	180	Senior	Dakar, Senegal
10	Patrick Myers	Guard	6–2	185	Sophomore	Orangeburg, South Carolina
11	Shaquille Mitchell	Guard	6–4	190	Sophomore	Hollywood, South Carolina
12	Greg Mortimer	Guard	6–3	175	Freshman	Savannah, Georgia
15	Devin Joint	Guard	6–4	190	Sophomore	Darlington, South Carolina
20	Chasen Campbell	Forward	6–8	250	Senior	Charlotte, North Carolina
22	Matthew Hezekiah	Forward	6–11	225	Senior	Jacksonville, Florida
23	Darrion Eastmon	Guard	6–2	180	Sophomore	Fayetteville, North Carolina
30	Darryl Palmer	Forward	6–7	210	Sophomore	Summerville, South Carolina
32	Karon Wright	Guard	6–0	185	Freshman	Jackson, South Carolina
33	Luka Radovic	Forward	6–9	220	Junior	Podgorica, Montenegro

== Schedule ==
Date time, TV	Opponent	Result	Record	Site (attendance) city, state
Regular season
11/14/2014*; 10:00 pm, P12N	at Washington	L 59–77	0–1	Alaska Airlines Airlines (2,898); Seattle
11/16/2014*; 10:00 pm	at San Francisco	L 52–91	0–2	War Memorial Gymnasium (1,525); San Francisco
11/18/2014*; 7:00 pm, RSN	at No. 9 Virginia	L 55–75	0–3	John Paul Jones Arena (12,493); Charlottesville, Virginia
11/25/2014*; 8:00 pm	Columbia International	W 92–55	1–3	SHM Memorial Center (312); Orangeburg, South Carolina
11/29/2014*; 2:30 pm	at Georgia Southern	L 58–71	1–4	Hanner Fieldhouse (802); Statesboro, Georgia
12/02/2014*; 7:00 pm	at Coastal Carolina	L 52–66	1–5	HTC Center (1,910); Conway, South Carolina
12/06/2014; 6:00 pm	Florida A&M	W 70–61	2–5 (1–0)	SHM Memorial Center (415); Orangeburg, South Carolina
12/08/2014; 7:30 pm	Bethune-Cookman	W 71–66	3–5 (2–0	SHM Memorial Center (634); Orangeburg, South Carolina
12/11/2014*; 7:00 pm	at College of Charleston	L 47–50	3–6	TD Arena (2,626); Charleston, South Carolina
12/14/2014*; 3:00 pm	Coastal Carolina	L 43–57	3–7	SHM Memorial Center (207); Orangeburg, South Carolina
12/17/2014*; 7:00 pm	at Texas Tech; Las Vegas Classic	L 39–101	3–8	United Supermarkets Arena (5,164); Lubbock, Texas
12/20/2014*; 2:00 pm, ESPN3	at Houston	W 71–63	4–8	Hofheinz Pavilion (1,996); Houston, Texas
12/22/2014*; 3:30 pm	vs. Abilene Christian; Las Vegas Classic	L 59–65	4–9	Orleans Arena (500); Paradise, Nevada
12/23/2014*; 3:30 pm	vs. Southern Utah; Las Vegas Classic	L 56–66	4–10	Orleans Arena (N/A); Paradise, Nevada
12/31/2014*; 2:00 pm	at Fordham	L 54–74	4–11	Rose Hill Gymnasium (1,262); Bronx, New York
01/03/2015*; 2:00 pm	at Eastern Kentucky	L 52–63	4–12	McBrayer Arena (2,300); Richmond, Kentucky
01/10/2015; 4:00 pm	at North Carolina Central	L 45–76	4–13 (2–1)	McLendon–McDougald Gymnasium (1,312); Durham, North Carolina
01/12/2015; 7:30 pm	at North Carolina A&T	W 52–50	5–13 (3–1)	Corbett Sports Center (1,827); Greensboro, North Carolina
01/17/2015; 7:30 pm	at Delaware State	L 49–60	5–14 (3–2)	Memorial Hall (1,549); Dover, Delaware
01/19/2015; 7:30 pm	at Maryland Eastern Shore	W 73–72 ^{OT}	6–14 (4–2)	Hytche Athletic Center (793); Princess Anne, Maryland
01/24/2014; 6:00 pm	Norfolk State	L 63–76	6–15 (4–3)	SHM Memorial Center (575); Orangeburg, South Carolina
01/26/2014; 7:30 pm	Hampton	W 65–56	7–15 (5–3)	SHM Memorial Center (707); Orangeburg, South Carolina
01/31/2014; 6:00 pm	Delaware State	W 78–74	8–15 (6–3)	SHM Memorial Center (915); Orangeburg, South Carolina
02/04/2014*; 7:00 pm	St. Andrews	W 80–48	9–15	SHM Memorial Center (650); Orangeburg, South Carolina
02/07/2014; 4:00 pm	at Coppin State	L 74–77	9–16 (6–4)	Physical Education Complex (963); Baltimore
02/09/2014; 7:30 pm	at Morgan State	L 43–55	9–17 (6–5)	Talmadge L. Hill Field House (1,105); Baltimore, Maryland
02/14/2014; 6:00 pm	at Savannah State	W 56–53	10–17 (7–5)	Tiger Arena (N/A); Savannah, Georgia
02/21/2014; 6:00 pm	Maryland Eastern Shore	L 56–68	10–18 (7–6)	SHM Memorial Center (935); Orangeburg, South Carolina
02/23/2014; 7:30 pm	Howard	L 65–75	10–19 (7–7)	SHM Memorial Center (1,013); Orangeburg, South Carolina
02/28/2014; 7:30 pm	Savannah State	L 57–68	10–20 (7–8)	SHM Memorial Center (551); Orangeburg, South Carolina
03/05/2015; 7:30 pm	at Bethune-Cookman	L 62–72	10–21 (7–9)	Moore Gymnasium (712); Daytona Beach, Florida
MEAC tournament
03/10/2015; 8:00 pm	vs. North Carolina A&T; First round	W 63–54	11–21	Norfolk Scope; Norfolk, Virginia
03/11/2015; 8:25 pm	vs. Norfolk State; Quarterfinals	L 54–68	11–22	Norfolk Scope; Norfolk, Virginia
*Non-conference game. ^{#}Rankings from AP Poll. (#) Tournament seedings in parentheses. All times are in Eastern Time.
