= 2014–15 Morgan State Bears basketball team =

American college basketball season

2014–15 Morgan State Bears men's basketball
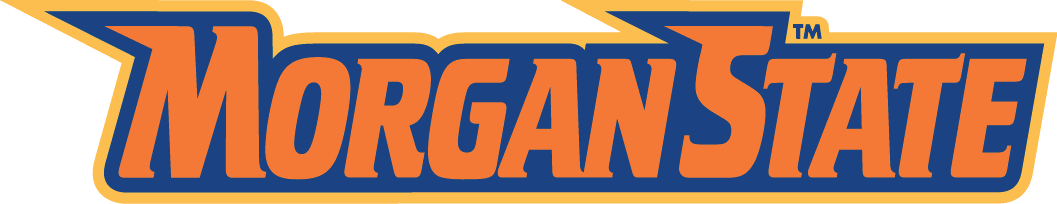
- Conference: Mid-Eastern Athletic Conference
- Record: 7–24 (5–11 MEAC)
- Head coach: Todd Bozeman (9th season)
- Assistant coaches: Kevin McClain; Keith Goodie; Glenroy Palmer
- Home arena: Talmadge L. Hill Field House

2014–15 MEAC men's basketball standings
	Conf.				Overall
Team	W		L	PCT	W		L	PCT
North Carolina Central	16	–	0	1.000	25	–	8	.758
Norfolk State	12	–	4	.750	20	–	14	.588
Maryland Eastern Shore	11	–	5	.688	18	–	15	.545
Howard	10	–	6	.625	16	–	16	.500
Delaware State	9	–	7	.563	18	–	18	.500
Hampton †	8	–	8	.500	17	–	18	.486
South Carolina State	7	–	9	.438	11	–	22	.333
Bethune–Cookman	7	–	9	.438	11	–	21	.344
Coppin State	6	–	10	.375	8	–	23	.258
North Carolina A&T	6	–	10	.375	9	–	23	.281
Morgan State	5	–	11	.313	7	–	24	.226
Savannah State	5	–	11	.313	9	–	22	.290
Florida A&M	2	–	14	.125	2	–	27	.069
† 2015 MEAC tournament winner

The 2014–15 Morgan State Bears men's basketball team represented Morgan State University during the 2014–15 NCAA Division I men's basketball season. The Bears, led by ninth year head coach Todd Bozeman, played their home games at the Talmadge L. Hill Field House and were members of the Mid-Eastern Athletic Conference. They finished the season 7–24, 5–11 in MEAC play to finish in a tie for 11th place. They lost in the first round of the MEAC tournament to Hampton.

== Roster ==
Number	Name	Position	Height	Weight	Year	Hometown
1	Donte Pretlow	Guard	6–0	185	Junior	Baltimore, Maryland
2	Torin Childs-Harris	Guard	6–4	185	Sophomore	New London, Connecticut
3	Rasean Simpson	Guard	6–5	190	Junior	San Diego, California
4	Jamar Redmond	Guard	6–3	190	Freshman	Roselle, New Jersey
5	Conrad Chambers	Guard	6–1	180	Freshman	Chester, Pennsylvania
10	Emmanuel Matey	Guard	5–11	190	Sophomore	Greenbelt, Maryland
11	Clive "C.J." Vaughan, Jr.	Guard	6–2	175	Freshman	Aurora, Illinois
12	Cliff Cornish	Forward	6–8	240	Sophomore	Baltimore, Maryland
21	Kyle Thomas	Forward	6–7	200	Sophomore	Owings Mills, Maryland
22	Blake Bozeman	Guard	6–2	170	Senior	Bowie, Maryland
33	Jeremiah Curtis	Forward	6–8	230	Freshman	Stephens City, Virginia
34	Cedric Blossom	Forward	6–6	225	Junior	Columbia, Maryland
42	Jordan Omogbehin	Center	7–3	315	Senior	Lagos, Nigeria
44	Anthony "A.J." Vernon	Forward	6–9	255	Freshman	Brooklyn, New York
50	Zech Smith	Center	7–0	270	Senior	McLoud, Oklahoma
53	Willis Turnipseed	Forward	6–9	190	Senior	Baltimore, Maryland

== Schedule ==
Date time, TV	Opponent	Result	Record	Site (attendance) city, state
Regular season
11/14/2014*; 7:00 pm	at Penn State	L 48–61	0–1	Bryce Jordan Center (7,402); University Park, PA
11/17/2014*; 7:00 pm	Towson	L 46–51	0–2	Talmadge L. Hill Field House (3,874); Baltimore, MD
11/20/2014*; 8:00 pm	at Northern Iowa; Cancún Challenge	L 53–73	0–3	McLeod Center (3,127); Cedar Falls, IA
11/22/2014*; 8:00 pm, ESPN3	at Houston	L 57–72	0–4	Hofheinz Pavilion (3,058); Houston, TX
11/25/2014*; 1:30 pm	vs. Elon; Cancún Challenge	L 73–74	0–5	Hard Rock Hotel Riviera Maya (560); Cancún, MX
11/26/2014*; 1:30 pm	vs. Liberty; Cancún Challenge	W 51–50	1–5	Hard Rock Hotel Riviera Maya (540); Cancún, MX
11/30/2014*; 3:00 pm, ESPN3	at Virginia Tech; Cancún Challenge	L 63–83	1–6	Cassell Coliseum (3,996); Blacksburg, VA
12/06/2014; 6:00 pm	at Norfolk State	L 65–85	1–7 (0–1)	Joseph G. Echols Memorial Hall (1,027); Norfolk, VA
12/08/2014; 2:00 pm	at Hampton	L 58–62	1–8 (0–2)	Hampton Convocation Center (3,500); Hampton, VA
12/16/2014*; 7:00 pm	UC Irvine	W 63–62	2–8	Talmadge L. Hill Field House (895); Baltimore, MD
12/18/2014*; 7:30 pm	at Rider	L 48–62	2–9	Alumni Gymnasium (1,018); Lawrenceville, NJ
12/20/2014*; 7:00 pm	at Manhattan	L 69–73	2–10	Draddy Gymnasium (1,174); Riverdale, NY
12/28/2014*; 2:00 pm, FS1	at Marquette	L 53–81	2–11	BMO Harris Bradley Center (12,701); Milwaukee, WI
12/30/2014*; 10:00 pm	at UC Riverside	L 63–68	2–12	UC Riverside Student Recreation Center (288); Riverside, CA
01/02/2015*; 10:00 pm	at Cal State Northridge	W 78–62	2–13	Matadome (603); Northridge, CA
01/06/2015*; 10:00 pm	at Saint Mary's	L 52–78	2–14	McKeon Pavilion (2,278); Moraga, CA
01/10/2015; 4:00 pm	at Delaware State	W 73–69	3–14 (1–2)	Memorial Hall (975); Dover, DE
01/12/2015; 7:30 pm	Maryland Eastern Shore	L 53–78	3–15 (1–3)	Talmadge L. Hill Field House (1,117); Baltimore, MD
01/17/2015; 4:00 pm	Florida A&M	W 75–65	4–15 (2–3)	Talmadge L. Hill Field House (875); Baltimore, MD
01/19/2015; 4:00 pm	Bethune-Cookman	L 58–65	4–16 (2–4)	Talmadge L. Hill Field House (923); Baltimore, MD
01/31/2015; 4:00 pm	at Howard	L 48–64	4–17 (2–5)	Burr Gymnasium (2,332); Washington, D.C.
02/02/2015; 7:30 pm, ESPNU	at Coppin State	L 67–80	4–18 (2–6)	Physical Education Complex (2,003); Baltimore, MD
02/07/2015; 4:00 pm	Savannah State	W 67–57	5–18 (3–6)	Talmadge L. Hill Field House (1,005); Baltimore, MD
02/09/2015; 7:30 pm	South Carolina State	W 55–43	6–18 (4–6)	Talmadge L. Hill Field House (1,105); Baltimore, MD
02/14/2015; 4:00 pm	Norfolk State	W 73–70	7–18 (5–6)	Talmadge L. Hill Field House (1,569); Baltimore, MD
02/16/2015; 7:30 pm	Hampton	L 65–93	7–19 (5–7)	Talmadge L. Hill Field House (1,175); Baltimore, MD
02/21/2015; 4:00 pm	at North Carolina Central	L 59–74	7–20 (5–8)	McLendon–McDougald Gymnasium (2,593); Durham, NC
02/23/2015; 7:30 pm	at North Carolina A&T	L 57–60 ^{OT}	7–21 (5–9)	Corbett Sports Center (1,097); Greensboro, NC
02/28/2015; 4:00 pm	Coppin State	L 77–88	7–22 (5–10)	Talmadge L. Hill Field House (4,237); Baltimore, MD
03/05/2015; 7:30 pm	at Maryland Eastern Shore	L 76–89	7–23 (5–11)	Hytche Athletic Center (2,018); Princess Anne, MD
MEAC tournament
03/09/2015; 9:00 pm	vs. Hampton; First round	L 71–91	7–24	Norfolk Scope; Norfolk, VA
*Non-conference game. ^{#}Rankings from AP Poll. (#) Tournament seedings in parentheses. All times are in Eastern Time.
