= 2014–15 Bethune–Cookman Wildcats men's basketball team =

American college basketball season

2014–15 Bethune–Cookman Wildcats men's basketball
- Conference: Mid-Eastern Athletic Conference
- Record: 11–21 (7–9 MEAC)
- Head coach: Gravelle Craig (4th season)
- Assistant coaches: Rodney Martin; Stacy Beckton; Montez Robinson
- Home arena: Moore Gymnasium

2014–15 MEAC men's basketball standings
	Conf.				Overall
Team	W		L	PCT	W		L	PCT
North Carolina Central	16	–	0	1.000	25	–	8	.758
Norfolk State	12	–	4	.750	20	–	14	.588
Maryland Eastern Shore	11	–	5	.688	18	–	15	.545
Howard	10	–	6	.625	16	–	16	.500
Delaware State	9	–	7	.563	18	–	18	.500
Hampton †	8	–	8	.500	17	–	18	.486
South Carolina State	7	–	9	.438	11	–	22	.333
Bethune–Cookman	7	–	9	.438	11	–	21	.344
Coppin State	6	–	10	.375	8	–	23	.258
North Carolina A&T	6	–	10	.375	9	–	23	.281
Morgan State	5	–	11	.313	7	–	24	.226
Savannah State	5	–	11	.313	9	–	22	.290
Florida A&M	2	–	14	.125	2	–	27	.069
† 2015 MEAC tournament winner

The 2014–15 Bethune–Cookman Wildcats men's basketball team represented Bethune–Cookman University during the 2014–15 NCAA Division I men's basketball season. The Wildcats, led by fourth year head coach Gravelle Craig, played their home games at the Moore Gymnasium and were members of the Mid-Eastern Athletic Conference. They finished the season 11–21, 7–9 in MEAC play to finish in a tie for seventh place. They lost in the first round of the MEAC tournament to Coppin State.

== Roster ==
Number	Name	Position	Height	Weight	Year	Hometown
1	Delino Dear	Forward	6–9	220	RS–Junior	Chicago, Illinois
2	Quentin Brewer	Forward	6–8	220	Junior	Tampa, Florida
3	Tony Kynard	Guard	6–1	160	Sophomore	Toledo, Ohio
5	Troy Simmons	Guard	6–1	170	Senior	Lehigh Acres, Florida
11	Maurice Taylor	Guard	6–3	180	Senior	Toledo, Ohio
12	Mikel Trapp	Guard	6–2	195	Senior	Blair, South Carolina
15	Jeffon Powell	Guard/Forward	6–6	200	Sophomore	Philadelphia, PA
21	Clemmye Owens	Guard	6–1	185	Sophomore	Toledo, Ohio
22	Ricky Johnson	Guard	5–9	160	RS–Junior	Akron, Ohio
23	Denzel Dulin	Guard	6–4	200	Junior	Brooklyn, New York
32	Travis Elliott	Center	6–8	230	RS–Senior	Fort Lauderdale, Florida

== Schedule ==
Date time, TV	Opponent	Result	Record	Site (attendance) city, state
Regular season
11/15/2014*; 1:00 pm	Trinity College	W 91–69	1–0	Moore Gymnasium (N/A); Daytona Beach, FL
11/17/2014*; 10:00 pm, P12N	at Arizona State; CBE Hall of Fame Classic	L 39–49	1–1	Wells Fargo Arena (3,842); Tempe, AZ
11/21/2014*; 7:30 pm	at Monmouth; CBE Hall of Fame Classic	L 50–73	1–2	Multipurpose Activity Center (1,428); West Long Branch, NJ
11/22/2014*; 5:00 pm	vs. Towson; CBE Hall of Fame Classic	W 63–42	1–3	Multipurpose Activity Center (1,357); West Long Branch, NJ
11/23/2014*; 2:00 pm	vs. Central Connecticut; CBE Hall of Fame Classic	W 65–60	2–3	Multipurpose Activity Center (1,225); West Long Branch, NJ
11/25/2014*; 7:00 pm	UT Martin	L 56–74	2–4	Moore Gymnasium (N/A); Daytona Beach, FL
11/30/2014*; 3:00 pm, ESPN3	at UCF	L 67–75	2–5	CFE Arena (3,258); Orlando, FL
12/03/2014*; 8:00 pm	North Florida	L 56–63	2–6	Moore Gymnasium (904); Daytona Beach, FL
12/06/2014*; 4:00 pm	Jacksonville	W 52–47	3–6	Moore Gymnasium (905); Daytona Beach, FL
12/08/2014; 7:30 pm	at South Carolina State	L 66–71	3–7 (0–1)	SHM Memorial Center (634); Orangeburg, SC
12/15/2014*; 10:30 pm	at Grand Canyon	L 50–60	3–8	GCU Arena (3,826); Phoenix, AZ
12/19/2014*; 7:00 pm, ESPN3	at Mercer	L 46–67	3–9	Hawkins Arena (2,487); Macon, GA
12/30/2014*; 4:00 pm	at The Citadel	L 47–51	3–10	McAlister Field House (1,007); Charleston, SC
01/03/2015*; 7:00 pm	at Ball State	L 48–51	3–11	John E. Worthen Arena (2,353); Muncie, IN
01/05/2015*; 7:00 pm	Trinity Baptist	W 97–71	4–11	Moore Gymnasium (199); Daytona Beach, FL
01/10/2015; 4:00 pm	Hampton	L 56–58	4–12 (0–2)	Moore Gymnasium (757); Daytona Beach, FL
01/12/2015; 7:30 pm	Norfolk State	L 55–79	4–13 (0–3)	Moore Gymnasium (804); Daytona Beach, FL
01/17/2015; 6:00 pm	at Coppin State	W 58–53	5–13 (1–3)	Physical Education Complex (355); Baltimore, MD
01/19/2015; 4:00 pm	at Morgan State	W 65–58	6–13 (2–3)	Talmadge L. Hill Field House (923); Baltimore, MD
01/24/2015; 4:00 pm	Maryland Eastern Shore	L 70–74	6–14 (2–4)	Moore Gymnasium (726); Daytona Beach, FL
01/26/2015; 7:30 pm	Howard	L 42–45	6–15 (2–5)	Moore Gymnasium (804); Daytona Beach, FL
01/31/2015; 4:00 pm	at Florida A&M	W 61–44	7–15 (3–5)	Teaching Gym (4,923); Tallahassee, FL
02/03/2015*; 7:30 pm	Stetson	L 72–77	7–16	Moore Gymnasium (1,150); Daytona Beach, FL
02/07/2015; 4:00 pm	at Delaware State	W 75–70	8–16 (4–5)	Memorial Hall (1,532); Dover, DE
02/14/2015; 4:00 pm	North Carolina Central	L 51–65	8–17 (4–6)	Moore Gymnasium (619); Daytona Beach, FL
02/16/2015; 4:00 pm	North Carolina A&T	W 77–56	9–17 (5–6)	Moore Gymnasium (602); Daytona Beach, FL
02/21/2015; 7:30 pm	Florida A&M	W 64–56	10–17 (6–6)	Moore Gymnasium (1,223); Daytona Beach, FL
02/25/2015; 7:30 pm	at Savannah State	L 49–58	10–18 (6–7)	Tiger Arena (915); Savannah, GA
02/28/2015; 4:00 pm	at North Carolina Central	L 49–72	10–19 (6–8)	McLendon–McDougald Gymnasium (2,310); Durham,, NC
03/02/2015; 7:30 pm	at North Carolina A&T	L 50–67	10–20 (6–9)	Corbett Sports Center (903); Greensboro, NC
03/06/2015; 7:30 pm	South Carolina State	W 72–62	11–20 (7–9)	Moore Gymnasium (712); Daytona Beach, FL
MEAC tournament
03/10/2015; 6:00 pm	vs. Coppin State; First round	L 60–64	11–21	Norfolk Scope; Norfolk, VA
*Non-conference game. ^{#}Rankings from AP Poll. (#) Tournament seedings in parentheses. All times are in Eastern Time.
