= 2014–15 Coppin State Eagles men's basketball team =

American college basketball season

2014–15 Coppin State Eagles men's basketball
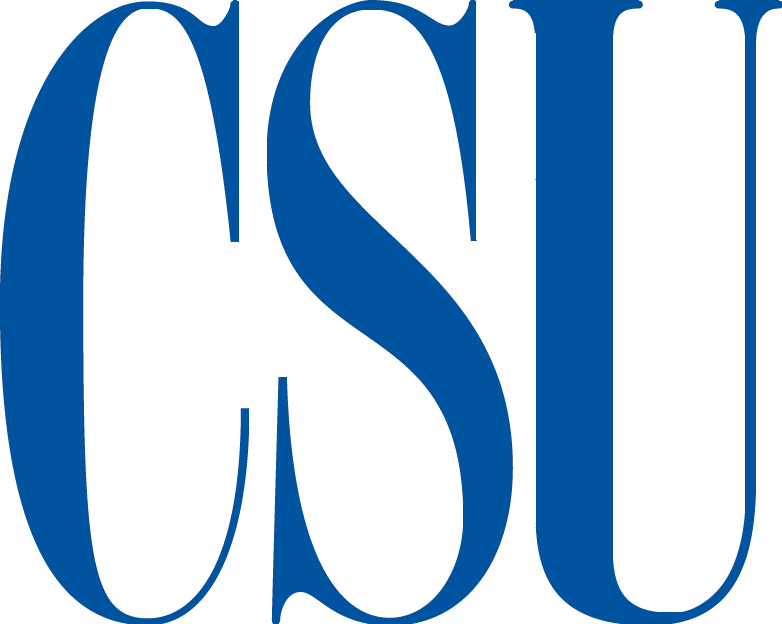
- Conference: Mid-Eastern Athletic Conference
- Record: 8–23 (6–10 MEAC)
- Head coach: Michael Grant (1st season)
- Assistant coaches: Elwyn McRoy; Doug Lewis; Kevin Jones
- Home arena: Physical Education Complex

2014–15 MEAC men's basketball standings
	Conf.				Overall
Team	W		L	PCT	W		L	PCT
North Carolina Central	16	–	0	1.000	25	–	8	.758
Norfolk State	12	–	4	.750	20	–	14	.588
Maryland Eastern Shore	11	–	5	.688	18	–	15	.545
Howard	10	–	6	.625	16	–	16	.500
Delaware State	9	–	7	.563	18	–	18	.500
Hampton †	8	–	8	.500	17	–	18	.486
South Carolina State	7	–	9	.438	11	–	22	.333
Bethune–Cookman	7	–	9	.438	11	–	21	.344
Coppin State	6	–	10	.375	8	–	23	.258
North Carolina A&T	6	–	10	.375	9	–	23	.281
Morgan State	5	–	11	.313	7	–	24	.226
Savannah State	5	–	11	.313	9	–	22	.290
Florida A&M	2	–	14	.125	2	–	27	.069
† 2015 MEAC tournament winner

The 2014–15 Coppin State Eagles men's basketball team represented Coppin State University during the 2014–15 NCAA Division I men's basketball season. The Eagles, led by first year head coach Michael Grant, played their home games at the Physical Education Complex and were members of the Mid-Eastern Athletic Conference. They finished the season 8–23 6–10 in MEAC play to finish in a tie for ninth place. They advanced to the quarterfinals of the MEAC Tournament where they lost to North Carolina Central.

== Roster ==
Number	Name	Position	Height	Weight	Year	Hometown
0	Van Rolle	Guard	6–1	170	Sophomore	Edgewood, Maryland
1	Dallas Gary	Forward	6–5	210	Senior	Buffalo, New York
2	Lawrence Fejokwu	Center	6–9	260	Junior	Lagos, Nigeria
3	Arnold Fripp	Forward	6–7	210	Senior	Brooklyn, New York
5	Daguan Brickhouse	Guard	5–8	160	Senior	Peekskill, New York
10	Christian Kessee	Guard	6–2	180	Sophomore	Las Vegas, Nevada
11	Taariq Cephas	Guard	5–10	165	Senior	Bear, Delaware
15	Blake Simpson	Forward	6–7	225	Freshman	Cincinnati, Ohio
20	Shomari Triggs	Guard	5–9	190	Junior	Milwaukee, Wisconsin
21	Johyari Josiah	Guard	6–4	185	Senior	Brooklyn, New York
22	Michael Oyefusi	Guard	6–3	205	Junior	Randallstown, Maryland
40	Brandon St. Louis	Forward	6–8	240	Senior	Valley Stream, New York
54	Jerimyiah Batts	Forward	6–8	255	Sophomore	Jenkintown, Pennsylvania

== Schedule ==
Date time, TV	Opponent	Result	Record	Site (attendance) city, state
Regular season
11/14/2014*; 11:00 pm, P12N	at Oregon	L 65–107	0–1	Matthew Knight Arena (5,467); Eugene, OR
11/16/2014*; 6:00 pm	at Illinois	L 56–114	0–2	State Farm Center (12,272); Champaign, IL
11/19/2014*; 7:00 pm	at Notre Dame	L 67–104	0–3	Edmund P. Joyce Center (6,343); South Bend, IN
11/23/2014*; 3:00 pm	at Denver	L 54–80	0–4	Magness Arena (N/A); Denver, CO
12/01/2014*; 7:30 pm	Goldey–Beacom	W 103–50	1–4	Physical Education Complex (721); Baltimore, MD
12/03/2014*; 7:00 pm	at Towson	L 76–84	1–5	SECU Arena (2,154); Towson, MD
12/06/2014; 6:00 pm	at Hampton	L 52–71	1–6 (0–1)	Hampton Convocation Center (2,000); Hampton, VA
12/08/2014; 7:00 pm	at Norfolk State	L 69–88	1–7 (0–2)	Joseph G. Echols Memorial Hall (1,320); Norfolk, VA
12/10/2014*; 7:30 pm	Hofstra	L 64–105	1–8	Physical Education Complex (618); Baltimore, MD
12/14/2014*; 7:00 pm, SNY	at UConn	L 85–106	1–9	XL Center (8,260); Hartford, CT
12/22/2014*; 8:00 pm, BTN	at Michigan	L 56–72	1–10	Crisler Center (11,989); Ann Arbor, MI
12/23/2014*; 6:00 pm	at Eastern Michigan	L 64–87	1–11	Convocation Center (827); Ypsilanti, MI
12/28/2014*; 2:00 pm	at Evansville	L 80–85	1–12	Ford Center (4,329); Evansville, IN
12/30/2014*; 1:00 pm	Eastern Kentucky	L 63–66	1–13	Physical Education Complex (638); Baltimore, MD
01/03/2015*; 7:00 pm	at Akron	L 62–79	1–14	James A. Rhodes Arena (2,907); Akron, OH
01/10/2015; 4:00 pm	at Howard	L 69–71	1–15 (0–3)	Burr Gymnasium (345); Washington, D.C.
01/17/2015; 4:00 pm	Bethune-Cookman	L 53–58	1–16 (0–4)	Physical Education Complex (355); Baltimore, MD
01/19/2015; 7:30 pm	Florida A&M	W 87–75	2–16 (1–4)	Physical Education Complex (538); Baltimore, MD
01/24/2015; 7:30 pm	at North Carolina Central	L 77–79	2–17 (1–5)	McLendon–McDougald Gymnasium (2,302); Durham, NC
01/26/2015; 4:00 pm	at North Carolina A&T	W 84–71	3–17 (2–5)	Corbett Sports Center (1,294); Greensboro, NC
01/31/2015; 4:00 pm	at Maryland Eastern Shore	L 82–92	3–18 (2–6)	Hytche Athletic Center (2,871); Princess Anne, MD
02/02/2015; 7:30 pm, ESPNU	Morgan State	W 80–67	4–18 (3–6)	Physical Education Complex (2,003); Baltimore, MD
02/07/2015; 4:00 pm	South Carolina State	W 77–74	5–18 (4–6)	Physical Education Complex (963); Baltimore, MD
02/09/2015; 7:30 pm	Savannah State	L 70–73	5–19 (4–7)	Physical Education Complex (905); Baltimore, MD
02/14/2015; 4:00 pm	Howard	L 60–77	5–20 (4–8)	Physical Education Complex (1,304); Baltimore, MD
02/16/2015; 7:30 pm	at Delaware State	W 96–92	6–20 (5–8)	Memorial Hall (1,238); Dover, DE
02/21/2015; 4:00 pm	Norfolk State	L 81–99	6–21 (5–9)	Physical Education Complex (289); Baltimore, MD
02/28/2015; 4:00 pm	at Morgan State	W 88–77	7–21 (6–9)	Talmadge L. Hill Field House (4,237); Baltimore, MD
03/05/2015; 7:30 pm	Delaware State	L 92–104	7–22 (6–10)	Physical Education Complex (538); Baltimore, MD
MEAC tournament
03/10/2015; 6:00 pm	vs. Bethune-Cookman; First round	W 64–60	8–22	Norfolk Scope; Norfolk, VA
03/11/2015; 6:00 pm	vs. North Carolina Central; Quarterfinals	L 43–91	8–23	Norfolk Scope; Norfolk, VA
*Non-conference game. ^{#}Rankings from AP Poll. (#) Tournament seedings in parentheses. All times are in Eastern Time.
