= 2014–15 Florida A&M Rattlers basketball team =

American college basketball season

2014–15 Florida A&M Rattlers men's basketball
- Conference: Mid-Eastern Athletic Conference
- Record: 2–27 (2–14 MEAC)
- Head coach: Byron Samuels (1st season)
- Assistant coaches: Donald Anderson; Bruce Martin
- Home arena: Teaching Gym

2014–15 MEAC men's basketball standings
	Conf.				Overall
Team	W		L	PCT	W		L	PCT
North Carolina Central	16	–	0	1.000	25	–	8	.758
Norfolk State	12	–	4	.750	20	–	14	.588
Maryland Eastern Shore	11	–	5	.688	18	–	15	.545
Howard	10	–	6	.625	16	–	16	.500
Delaware State	9	–	7	.563	18	–	18	.500
Hampton †	8	–	8	.500	17	–	18	.486
South Carolina State	7	–	9	.438	11	–	22	.333
Bethune–Cookman	7	–	9	.438	11	–	21	.344
Coppin State	6	–	10	.375	8	–	23	.258
North Carolina A&T	6	–	10	.375	9	–	23	.281
Morgan State	5	–	11	.313	7	–	24	.226
Savannah State	5	–	11	.313	9	–	22	.290
Florida A&M	2	–	14	.125	2	–	27	.069
† 2015 MEAC tournament winner

The 2014–15 Florida A&M Rattlers basketball team represented Florida A&M University during the 2014–15 NCAA Division I men's basketball season. The Rattlers, led by first year head coach Byron Samuels, played their home games at the Teaching Gym and were members of the Mid-Eastern Athletic Conference. They finished the season 2–27, 2–14 in MEAC play to finish in last place. Due to failing to meet APR requirements, the Rattlers were banned from postseason play including the MEAC tournament.

After an 0–23 start, the Rattlers became the last team in Division I to get a win during the 2014–15 season with a 57–50 win over North Carolina A&T on February 14.

== Roster ==
Number	Name	Position	Height	Weight	Year	Hometown
2	Jayson Snearl	Forward	6–5	215	Freshman	Lithonia, Georgia
3	Craig Bowman	Guard	6–3	170	Freshman	St. Petersburg, Florida
4	Jermaine Ruttley	Guard	6–3	200	Junior	Radcliffe, Kentucky
5	Jerran Foster	Guard	5–9	175	Junior	Winston-Salem, North Carolina
10	Johnathan Spicer	Forward	6–4	190	Freshman	Miami, Florida
11	Malcolm Bernard	Forward	6–5	195	Junior	Middleburg, Florida
12	Jordan Jackson	Forward	6–10	225	Freshman	Roy, Washington
15	Mario Karailiev	Center	6–9	230	Sophomore	Montana, Bulgaria
21	Quentin Bastian	Guard	6–6	245	Senior	Nassau, Bahamas
25	Jorge Rose	Guard	6–5	195	Freshman	Orlando, Florida
33	Emanuel Pellot	Forward	6–9	230	Junior	Miami, Florida

== Schedule ==
Date time, TV	Opponent	Result	Record	Site (attendance) city, state
Regular season
11/14/2014*; 7:00 pm, ESPN3	at Clemson	L 41–86	0–1	Littlejohn Coliseum (6,646); Clemson, SC
11/15/2014*; 7:30 pm	at USC Upstate	L 65–78	0–2	G. B. Hodge Center (866); Spartanburg, SC
11/19/2014*; 10:00 pm, FSSD	at San Diego	L 41–72	0–3	Jenny Craig Pavilion (1,621); San Diego, CA
11/21/2014*; 10:00 pm	at Grand Canyon	L 49–64	0–4	GCU Arena (5,866); Phoenix
11/24/2014*; 10:00 pm	at Wyoming; Wyoming Tournament	L 45–66	0–5	Arena-Auditorium (4,763); Laramie, WY
11/26/2014*; 10:00 pm	at New Mexico State; Wyoming Tournament	L 33–78	0–6	Pan American Center (4,958); Las Cruces, NM
11/29/2014*; 3:00 pm	vs. Stetson; Wyoming Tournament	L 50–62	0–7	Bank of Colorado Arena (N/A); Greeley, CO
11/30/2014*; 5:00 pm	at Northern Colorado; Wyoming Tournament	L 56–95	0–8	Bank of Colorado Arena (N/A); Greeley, CO
12/06/2014; 4:00 pm	at South Carolina State	L 61–70	0–9 (0–1)	SHM Memorial Center (415); Orangeburg, SC
12/19/2014*; 7:00 pm	North Florida	L 65–83	0–10	Teaching Gym (N/A); Tallahassee, FL
12/22/2014*; 7:00 pm, ESPN3	at East Carolina	L 57–75	0–11	Williams Arena at Minges Coliseum (4,234); Greenville, NC
12/29/2014*; 7:00 pm	FIU	L 55–76	0–12	Teaching Gym (279); Tallahassee, FL
01/03/2015*; 1:00 pm, ESPN3	at Stetson	L 60–65	0–13	Edmunds Center (923); DeLand, FL
01/06/2015*; 7:00 pm	Jacksonville	L 56–79	0–14	Teaching Gym (1,011); Tallahassee, FL
01/10/2015; 6:00 pm	Norfolk State	L 51–75	0–15 (0–2)	Teaching Gym (491); Tallahassee, FL
01/12/2015; 8:00 pm	Hampton	L 63–78	0–16 (0–3)	Teaching Gym (343); Tallahassee, FL
01/17/2015; 4:00 pm	at Morgan State	L 65–75	0–17 (0–4)	Talmadge L. Hill Field House (875); Baltimore, MD
01/19/2015; 4:00 pm	at Coppin State	L 75–87	0–18 (0–5)	Physical Education Complex (538); Baltimore, MD
01/24/2015; 6:00 pm	Howard	L 50–59	0–19 (0–6)	Teaching Gym (763); Tallahassee, FL
01/26/2015; 8:00 pm	Maryland Eastern Shore	L 65–72	0–20 (0–7)	Teaching Gym (607); Tallahassee, FL
01/31/2015; 3:00 pm	Bethune-Cookman	L 44–61	0–21 (0–8)	Teaching Gym (4,923); Tallahassee, FL
02/02/2015; 7:30 pm	at North Carolina Central	L 43–85	0–22 (0–9)	McLendon–McDougald Gymnasium (1,611); Durham,, NC
02/09/2015; 7:30 pm	at Delaware State	L 74–90	0–23 (0–10)	Memorial Hall (1,186); Dover, DE
02/14/2015; 6:00 pm	North Carolina A&T	W 57–50	1–23 (1–10)	Teaching Gym (539); Tallahassee, FL
02/16/2015; 8:00 pm	North Carolina Central	L 48–73	1–24 (1–11)	Teaching Gym (467); Tallahassee, FL
02/21/2015; 4:00 pm	at Bethune-Cookman	L 57–64	1–25 (1–12)	Moore Gymnasium (1,223); Daytona Beach, FL
02/23/2015; 7:00 pm	at Savannah State	L 52–63	1–26 (1–13)	Tiger Arena (1,210); Savannah, GA
02/28/2015; 6:00 pm	at North Carolina A&T	L 65–77	1–27 (1–14)	Corbett Sports Center (823); Greensboro, NC
03/05/2015; 8:00 pm	Savannah State	W 64–57	2–27 (2–14)	Teaching Gym (479); Tallahassee, FL
*Non-conference game. ^{#}Rankings from AP Poll. (#) Tournament seedings in parentheses. All times are in Eastern Time.
