= 2014–15 Howard Bison men's basketball team =

American college basketball season

2014–15 Howard Bison men's basketball
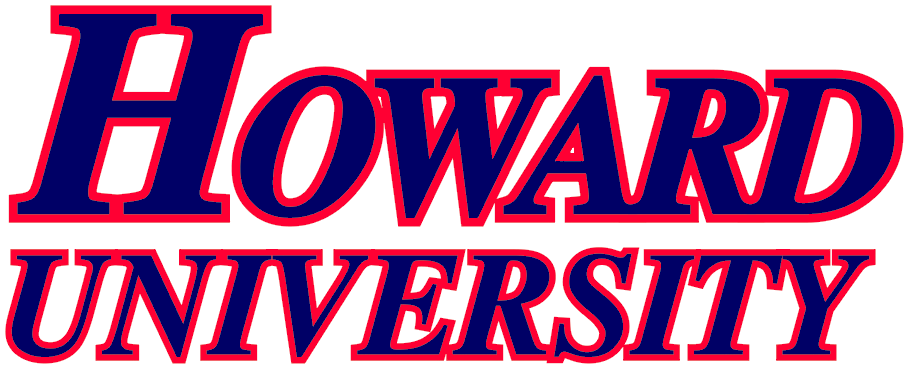
- Conference: Mid-Eastern Athletic Conference
- Record: 16–16 (10–6 MEAC)
- Head coach: Kevin Nickelberry (5th season)
- Assistant coaches: Keith Coutreyer; Travis Lyons; Victor Montgomery
- Home arena: Burr Gymnasium

2014–15 MEAC men's basketball standings
	Conf.				Overall
Team	W		L	PCT	W		L	PCT
North Carolina Central	16	–	0	1.000	25	–	8	.758
Norfolk State	12	–	4	.750	20	–	14	.588
Maryland Eastern Shore	11	–	5	.688	18	–	15	.545
Howard	10	–	6	.625	16	–	16	.500
Delaware State	9	–	7	.563	18	–	18	.500
Hampton †	8	–	8	.500	17	–	18	.486
South Carolina State	7	–	9	.438	11	–	22	.333
Bethune–Cookman	7	–	9	.438	11	–	21	.344
Coppin State	6	–	10	.375	8	–	23	.258
North Carolina A&T	6	–	10	.375	9	–	23	.281
Morgan State	5	–	11	.313	7	–	24	.226
Savannah State	5	–	11	.313	9	–	22	.290
Florida A&M	2	–	14	.125	2	–	27	.069
† 2015 MEAC tournament winner

The 2014–15 Howard Bison men's basketball team represented Howard University during the 2014–15 NCAA Division I men's basketball season. The Bison, led by fifth-year head coach Kevin Nickelberry, played their home games at the Burr Gymnasium and were members of the Mid-Eastern Athletic Conference. They finished the season 16–16, 10–6 in MEAC play to finish in fourth place. They lost in the quarterfinals of the MEAC tournament to Delaware State.

== Roster ==
Number	Name	Position	Height	Weight	Year	Hometown
0	Dalique Mingo	Guard	6–2	185	Freshman	Long Island, New York
1	James Carlton	Guard/forward	6–8	200	Senior	Durham, North Carolina
2	Kofi Andoh	Guard	6–2	175	Sophomore	Largo, Maryland
3	Prince Okoroh	Guard/forward	6–5	220	Senior	Greenbelt, Maryland
4	Ausar Madison	Guard	5–7	150	Sophomore	Carson, California
5	Marcel Boyd	Center	6–11	225	Sophomore	Accokeek, Maryland
10	Keon Hill	Guard	5–8	170	Sophomore	Largo, Maryland
11	James Daniel III	Guard	5–10	165	Sophomore	Hampton, Virginia
15	Damon Collins	Guard/forward	6–5	180	Sophomore	Dallas
20	Solomon Mangham	Forward/center	6–6	200	Sophomore	Stone Mountain, Georgia
21	Jared Norsworthy	Guard	6–2	170	Senior	La Cañada, California
22	Brandon Ford	Guard	6–3	190	Junior	Largo, Maryland
25	Theodore Boyomo	Center/forward	6–9	220	Senior	Cameroon
32	Tyler Stone	Forward	6–7	200	Sophomore	Toronto, Ontario, Canada
33	James Miller	Guard/forward	6–4	185	Sophomore	Clinton, North Carolina
44	Oliver Ellison	Center	6–8	190	Junior	Washington, D.C.

== Schedule ==
Date time, TV	Opponent	Result	Record	Site (attendance) city, state
Regular season
11/14/2014*; 7:00 pm	at Miami (FL)	L 49–84	0–1	BankUnited Center (4,544); Coral Gables, Florida
11/16/2014*; 6:00 pm	Goucher	W 101–54	1–1	Burr Gymnasium (640); Washington, D.C.
11/18/2014*; 7:00 pm	at William & Mary	L 49–56	1–2	Kaplan Arena (2,312); Williamsburg, Virginia
11/20/2014*; 7:30 pm	at Radford	W 61–52	1–3	Dedmon Center (2,715); Radford, Virginia
11/23/2014*; 7:00 pm	Hood	L 51–78	2–3	Burr Gymnasium (378); Washington, D.C.
11/25/2014*; 7:30 pm	at UMBC	W 68–54	3–3	Retriever Activities Center (588); Catonsville, Maryland
11/29/2014*; 4:00 pm	Gwynedd Mercy	W 96–83 ^{2OT}	4–3	Burr Gymnasium (256); Washington, D.C.
12/02/2014*; 7:00 pm	at Duquesne	L 63–81	4–4	Palumbo Center (1,337); Pittsburgh
12/06/2014; 2:00 pm	North Carolina A&T	L 47–54	5–4 (1–0)	Burr Gymnasium (N/A); Washington, D.C.
12/07/2014; 6:00 pm	vs. North Carolina Central; Big Apple Classic	L 39–61	5–5 (1–1)	Barclays Center (N/A); Brooklyn, New York
12/13/2014*; 7:00 pm	at Richmond; Gotham Classic	L 41–54	5–6	Robins Center (5,489); Richmond, Virginia
12/15/2014*; 6:00 pm	IUPUI; Gotham Classic	W 57–47	6–6	Burr Gymnasium (57); Washington, D.C.
12/17/2014*; 10:00 pm	at Pepperdine; Gotham Classic	L 45–53	6–7	Firestone Fieldhouse (885); Malibu, California
12/22/2014*; 8:00 pm	at South Alabama; Gotham Classic	W 73–60	7–7	Mitchell Center (1,243); Mobile, Alabama
12/28/2014*; 4:00 pm	at Fordham	L 59–74	7–8	Rose Hill Gymnasium (1,568); Bronx, New York
01/08/2015*; 7:00 pm	at Cornell	L 60–70	7–9	Newman Arena (1,142); Ithaca, New York
01/10/2015; 4:00 pm	Coppin State	W 71–69	8–9 (2–1)	Burr Gymnasium (345); Washington, D.C.
01/12/2015; 7:30 pm	Delaware State	L 76–79	8–10 (2–2)	Burr Gymnasium (1,665); Washington, D.C.
01/24/2015; 6:00 pm	at Florida A&M	W 59–50	9–10 (3–2)	Teaching Gym (763); Tallahassee, Florida
01/26/2015; 7:30 pm	at Bethune-Cookman	W 45–42	10–10 (4–2)	Moore Gymnasium (804); Daytona Beach, Florida
01/31/2015; 4:00 pm	Morgan State	W 64–48	11–10 (5–2)	Burr Gymnasium (2,332); Washington, D.C.
02/02/2015; 7:30 pm	Maryland Eastern Shore	W 83–74	12–10 (6–2)	Burr Gymnasium (N/A); Washington, D.C.
02/07/2015; 6:00 pm	at Norfolk State	L 69–72	12–11 (6–3)	Joseph G. Echols Memorial Hall (2,702); Norfolk, Virginia
02/09/2015; 7:00 pm	at Hampton	L 69–73 ^{OT}	12–12 (6–4)	Hampton Convocation Center (4,562); Hampton, Virginia
02/14/2015; 4:00 pm	at Coppin State	W 77–60	13–12 (7–4)	Physical Education Complex (1,304); Baltimore
02/16/2015; 7:30 pm	at Maryland Eastern Shore	L 60–71	13–13 (7–5)	Hytche Athletic Center (1,015); Princess Anne, Maryland
02/21/2015; 7:00 pm	at Savannah State	W 50–48	14–13 (8–5)	Tiger Arena (1,820); Savannah, Georgia
02/23/2015; 7:30 pm	at South Carolina State	W 75–65	15–13 (9–5)	SHM Memorial Center (1,013); Orangeburg, South Carolina
02/28/2015; 7:00 pm	Hampton	L 67–68	15–14 (9–6)	Burr Gymnasium (2,700); Washington, D.C.
03/02/2015; 7:30 pm	Norfolk State	W 61–59 ^{OT}	16–14 (10–6)	Burr Gymnasium (635); Washington, D.C.
03/04/2015*; 7:00 pm	NJIT	L 62–71	16–15	Burr Gymnasium (705); Washington, D.C.
MEAC tournament
03/12/2015; 8:00 pm	vs. Delaware State; Quarterfinals	L 60–65	16–16	Norfolk Scope; Norfolk, Virginia
*Non-conference game. ^{#}Rankings from AP Poll. (#) Tournament seedings in parentheses. All times are in Eastern Time.
