= 2014–15 North Carolina Central Eagles men's basketball team =

American college basketball season

2014–15 North Carolina Central Eagles men's basketball

MEAC regular season champions

NIT, First round
- Conference: Mid-Eastern Athletic Conference
- Record: 25–8 (16–0 MEAC)
- Head coach: LeVelle Moton (6th season)
- Assistant coaches: Brian Burg; Michael Cotton; Chris Skinkis
- Home arena: McLendon–McDougald Gymnasium

2014–15 MEAC men's basketball standings
	Conf.				Overall
Team	W		L	PCT	W		L	PCT
North Carolina Central	16	–	0	1.000	25	–	8	.758
Norfolk State	12	–	4	.750	20	–	14	.588
Maryland Eastern Shore	11	–	5	.688	18	–	15	.545
Howard	10	–	6	.625	16	–	16	.500
Delaware State	9	–	7	.563	18	–	18	.500
Hampton †	8	–	8	.500	17	–	18	.486
South Carolina State	7	–	9	.438	11	–	22	.333
Bethune–Cookman	7	–	9	.438	11	–	21	.344
Coppin State	6	–	10	.375	8	–	23	.258
North Carolina A&T	6	–	10	.375	9	–	23	.281
Morgan State	5	–	11	.313	7	–	24	.226
Savannah State	5	–	11	.313	9	–	22	.290
Florida A&M	2	–	14	.125	2	–	27	.069
† 2015 MEAC tournament winner

The 2014–15 North Carolina Central Eagles men's basketball team represented North Carolina Central University during the 2014–15 NCAA Division I men's basketball season. The Eagles, led by sixth year head coach LeVelle Moton, played their home games at the McLendon–McDougald Gymnasium and were members of the Mid-Eastern Athletic Conference. They finished the season 25–8, 16–0 in MEAC play to win the MEAC regular season championship. They advanced to the semifinals of the MEAC tournament where they were upset by Delaware State. As a regular season conference champion who failed to win their conference tournament, they received an automatic bid to the National Invitation Tournament where they lost in the first round to Miami (FL).

== Roster ==
Number	Name	Position	Height	Weight	Year	Hometown
0	Dante Holmes	Guard	6–3	190	Junior	Baltimore, Maryland
1	Jay Copeland Jr.	Forward	6–7	255	Senior	Suffolk, Virginia
2	Jordan Parks	Guard	6–7	200	Senior	Queens, New York
3	Rashawun Madison	Guard	6–0	165	Junior	Norfolk, Virginia
4	Kevin Crawford II	Guard	6–1	150	Sophomore	Blythewood, South Carolina
5	Anthony McDonald	Guard	6–1	180	Senior	Aberdeen, Mississippi
10	Karamo Jawara	Forward	6–8	235	Senior	Bergen, Norway
11	Nimrod Hilliard	Guard	6–0	155	Senior	Madison, Wisconsin
12	Jeremiah Ingram	Guard	6–7	215	Junior	Detroit, Michigan
13	Enoch Hood	Forward	6–9	215	Senior	Norfolk, Virginia
20	Jamal Ferguson	Guard	6–5	180	Junior	Norfolk, Virginia
23	Nate Mxey	Center	6–11	225	Junior	San Jose, California
35	Dajuan Graf	Guard	6–0	170	Junior	Charlotte, North Carolina

== Schedule ==
Date time, TV	Rank^{#}	Opponent^{#}	Result	Record	Site (attendance) city, state
Regular season
11/14/2014*; 8:00 pm, ESPNU		at No. 6 North Carolina	L 60–76	1–0	Dean Smith Center (17,338); Chapel Hill, NC
11/18/2014*; 7:00 pm		College of Faith	W 123–65	1–1	McLendon–McDougald Gymnasium (1,222); Durham, NC
11/23/2014*; 4:00 pm, FS1		at Creighton; Emerald Coast Classic	L 45–65	1–2	CenturyLink Center (17,290); Omaha, NE
11/25/2014*; 7:00 pm, FS Ohio		at Cincinnati; Emerald Coast Classic	L 50–59	1–3	Fifth Third Arena (7,015); Cincinnati, OH
11/28/2014*; 12:00 pm		vs. Eastern Illinois; Emerald Coast Classic	W 65–40	2–3	The Arena at NWFSC (125); Niceville, FL
11/29/2014*; 2:30 pm		vs. Northern Arizona; Emerald Coast Classic	W 40–36	3–3	The Arena at NWFSC (135); Niceville, FL
12/02/2014*; 7:00 pm		Johnson & Wales	W 101–38	4–3	McLendon–McDougald Gymnasium (702); Durham, NC
12/05/2014; 7:00 pm		at Maryland Eastern Shore	W 68–63	5–3 (1–0)	Hytche Athletic Center (2,874); Princess Anne, MD
12/07/2014; 6:00 pm		vs. Howard; Big Apple Classic	W 61–39	6–3 (2–0)	Barclays Center (N/A); Brooklyn, NY
12/10/2014*; 7:00 pm, BTN		at No. 19 Maryland	L 56–67	6–4	Xfinity Center (8,723); College Park, MD
12/15/2014*; 8:00 pm, ESPN3		at Memphis	L 47–81	6–5	FedExForum (13,126); Memphis, TN
12/17/2014*; 7:00 pm		Barber–Scotia	W 108–52	7–5	McLendon–McDougald Gymnasium (425); Durham, NC
12/20/2014*; 4:00 pm		at Mississippi Valley State	W 94–60	8–5	The Pinnacle (397); Clarksdale, MS
12/22/2014*; 8:00 pm		at Jackson State	W 67–64 ^{OT}	9–5	Williams Assembly Center (499); Jackson, MS
12/29/2014*; 7:00 pm		IUPUI	W 70–49	10–5	McLendon–McDougald Gymnasium (822); Durham, NC
01/10/2015; 4:00 pm		South Carolina State	W 76–45	11–5 (3–0)	McLendon–McDougald Gymnasium (1,312); Durham, NC
01/12/2015; 7:30 pm		Savannah State	W 58–40	12–5 (4–0)	McLendon–McDougald Gymnasium (1,479); Durham, NC
01/17/2015; 6:00 pm		at Norfolk State	W 60–56	13–5 (5–0)	Joseph G. Echols Memorial Hall (2,100); Norfolk, VA
01/19/2015; 8:00 pm		at Hampton	W 59–52	14–5 (6–0)	Hampton Convocation Center (5,045); Hampton, VA
01/24/2015; 4:00 pm		Coppin State	W 79–77	15–5 (7–0)	McLendon–McDougald Gymnasium (2,302); Durham, NC
01/26/2015; 7:00 pm, ESPNU		Delaware State	W 55–54	16–5 (8–0)	McLendon–McDougald Gymnasium (3,019); Durham, NC
01/31/2015*; 7:00 pm		at East Tennessee State	L 59–61	16–6	Freedom Hall Civic Center (2,957); Johnson City, TN
02/02/2015; 7:30 pm		Florida A&M	W 85–43	17–6 (9–0)	McLendon–McDougald Gymnasium (1,611); Durham, NC
02/07/2015; 6:00 pm		at North Carolina A&T	W 58–44	18–6 (10–0)	Corbett Sports Center (5,700); Greensboro, NC
02/14/2015; 4:00 pm		at Bethune-Cookman	W 65–51	19–6 (11–0)	Moore Gymnasium (619); Daytona Beach, FL
02/16/2015; 8:00 pm		at Florida A&M	W 73–48	20–6 (12–0)	Teaching Gym (467); Tallahassee, FL
02/21/2015; 4:00 pm		Morgan State	W 74–59	21–6 (13–0)	McLendon–McDougald Gymnasium (2,593); Durham, NC
02/28/2015; 4:00 pm		Bethune-Cookman	W 72–49	22–6 (14–0)	McLendon–McDougald Gymnasium (2,310); Durham, NC
03/02/2015; 8:00 pm		at Savannah State	W 62–49	23–6 (15–0)	Tiger Arena (1,430); Savannah, GA
03/05/2015; 7:30 pm		North Carolina A&T	W 69–58	24–6 (16–0)	McLendon–McDougald Gymnasium (3,116); Durham, NC
MEAC tournament
03/11/2015; 6:00 pm, ESPN3		vs. Coppin State; Quarterfinals	W 91–43	25–6	Norfolk Scope (N/A); Norfolk, VA
03/13/2015; 6:00 pm, ESPN3		vs. Delaware State; Semifinals	L 57–63	25–7	Norfolk Scope (N/A); Norfolk, VA
NIT
03/17/2015*; 7:00 pm, ESPN2	No. (7)	at (2) Miami (FL); First round	L 71–75	25–8	BankUnited Center (1,612); Coral Gables, FL
*Non-conference game. ^{#}Rankings from AP Poll. (#) Tournament seedings in parentheses. All times are in Eastern Time. (#) during NIT is seed within region.
