= 2014–15 Norfolk State Spartans men's basketball team =

American college basketball season

2014–15 Norfolk State Spartans men's basketball
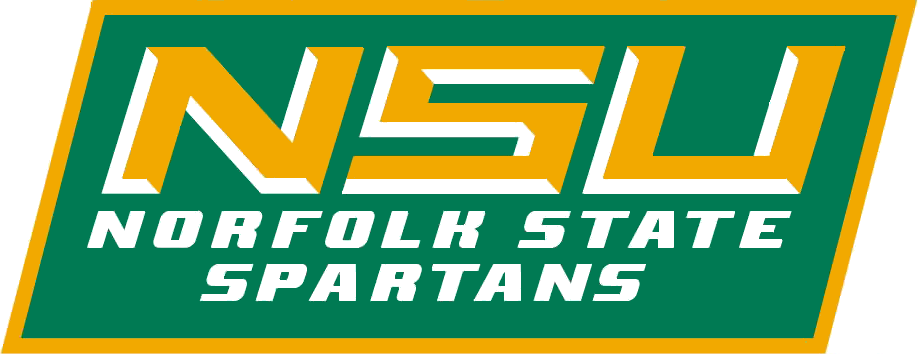

CIT, First round
- Conference: Mid-Eastern Athletic Conference
- Record: 20–14 (12–4 MEAC)
- Head coach: Robert Jones (2nd season)
- Associate head coach: Larry Vickers
- Assistant coaches: Kevin DeVantier; Raru Archer
- Home arena: Joseph G. Echols Memorial Hall

2014–15 MEAC men's basketball standings
	Conf.				Overall
Team	W		L	PCT	W		L	PCT
North Carolina Central	16	–	0	1.000	25	–	8	.758
Norfolk State	12	–	4	.750	20	–	14	.588
Maryland Eastern Shore	11	–	5	.688	18	–	15	.545
Howard	10	–	6	.625	16	–	16	.500
Delaware State	9	–	7	.563	18	–	18	.500
Hampton †	8	–	8	.500	17	–	18	.486
South Carolina State	7	–	9	.438	11	–	22	.333
Bethune–Cookman	7	–	9	.438	11	–	21	.344
Coppin State	6	–	10	.375	8	–	23	.258
North Carolina A&T	6	–	10	.375	9	–	23	.281
Morgan State	5	–	11	.313	7	–	24	.226
Savannah State	5	–	11	.313	9	–	22	.290
Florida A&M	2	–	14	.125	2	–	27	.069
† 2015 MEAC tournament winner

The 2014–15 Norfolk State Spartans men's basketball team represented Norfolk State University during the 2014–15 NCAA Division I men's basketball season. The Spartans, led by second-year coach Robert Jones, played their home games at the Joseph G. Echols Memorial Hall and were members of the Mid-Eastern Athletic Conference. They finished the season 20–14, 12–4 in MEAC play to finish in second place. They advanced to the semifinals of the MEAC tournament, where they lost to Hampton. They were invited to the CollegeInsider.com Tournament, where they lost in the first round to Eastern Kentucky.

== Roster ==
Number	Name	Position	Height	Weight	Year	Hometown
0	Kievyn Lila-St.Rose	Guard/forward	6–6	190	Senior	Corona, New York
2	Zaynah Robinson	Guard	5–11	170	Freshman	Duluth, Georgia
3	Jamel Fuentes	Guard	6–4	185	RS senior	Brooklyn, New York
4	D'Shon Taylor	Guard	6–5	195	Junior	Nassau, Bahamas
5	Jeff Short	Guard	6–4	195	RS junior	The Bronx, New York
11	Malik Thomas	Guard/forward	6–7	185	RS senior	Harlem, New York
15	Devonte Banner	Guard	6–1	165	Freshman	Mount Vernon, New York
21	Jordan Weathers	Guard	6–5	200	RS senior	Los Angeles, California
23	Malik Gray	Guard	6–6	205	Freshman	Newport News, Virginia
32	Paulius Vinogradovas	Center	7–1	215	Senior	Švenčionėliai, Lithuania
33	Hefeng Sun	Forward	6–8	230	RS junior	Shenzhen, China
35	RaShid Gaston	Forward	6–9	240	Junior	Warren, Ohio
45	Jordan Butler	Forward	6–6	240	Freshman	Hartford, Connecticut
50	LaTre'e Russell	Forward	6–6	215	Junior	Chicago, Illinois

== Schedule ==
Date time, TV	Opponent	Result	Record	Site (attendance) city, state
Regular season
11/14/2014*; 8:00 pm	Pfeiffer	W 81–43	1–0	Joseph G. Echols Memorial Hall (2,135); Norfolk, VA
11/16/2014*; 7:00 pm	at No. 9 Virginia; Barclays Center Classic	L 39–67	1–1	John Paul Jones Arena (12,845); Charlottesville, VA
11/19/2014*; 7:00 pm	Boston University	L 63–71	1–2	Joseph G. Echols Memorial Hall (1,100); Norfolk, VA
11/22/2014*; 5:00 pm	Texas Southern	W 76–66	2–2	Joseph G. Echols Memorial Hall (1,555); Norfolk, VA
11/25/2014*; 8:00 pm, SECN+	at Vanderbilt; Barclays Center Classic	L 53–63	2–3	Memorial Gymnasium (7,504); Nashville, TN
11/28/2014*; 5:00 pm	vs. St. Francis Brooklyn; Barclays Center Classic	W 72–70 ^{OT}	3–3	Yanitelli Center (N/A); Jersey City, NJ
11/29/2014*; 7:30 pm	vs. Saint Peter's; Barclays Center Classic	W 60–58	4–3	Yanitelli Center (321); Jersey City, NJ
12/02/2014*; 7:00 pm	at Hofstra	L 74–88	4–4	Mack Sports Complex (846); Hempstead, NY
12/06/2014; 6:00 pm	Morgan State	W 85–65	5–4 (1–0)	Joseph G. Echols Memorial Hall (1,027); Norfolk, VA
12/08/2014; 6:00 pm	Coppin State	W 88–69	6–4 (2–0)	Joseph G. Echols Memorial Hall (1,320); Norfolk, VA
12/13/2014*; 2:00 pm	at Mount St. Mary's	L 64–67 ^{OT}	6–5	Knott Arena (1,345); Emmitsburg, MD
12/15/2014*; 7:00 pm	Virginia–Wise	W 88–49	7–5	Joseph G. Echols Memorial Hall (395); Norfolk, VA
12/19/2014*; 7:00 pm	Northern Arizona	W 81–62	8–5	Joseph G. Echols Memorial Hall (473); Norfolk, VA
12/22/2014*; 7:00 pm	at James Madison	W 74–71 ^{OT}	9–5	JMU Convocation Center (2,864); Harrisonburg, VA
12/30/2014*; 8:00 pm	at No. 22 Baylor	L 51–92	9–6	Ferrell Center (5,138); Waco, TX
01/03/2014*; 2:00 pm	at Georgia	L 50–63	9–7	Stegeman Coliseum (6,273); Athens, GA
01/06/2015*; 7:00 pm	at Princeton	L 61–71	9–8	Jadwin Gymnasium (1,264); Princeton, NJ
01/10/2015; 6:00 pm	at Florida A&M	W 75–51	10–8 (3–0)	Teaching Gym (491); Tallahassee, FL
01/12/2015; 7:30 pm	at Bethune-Cookman	W 79–55	11–8 (4–0)	Moore Gymnasium (804); Daytona Beach, FL
01/17/2015; 6:00 pm	North Carolina Central	L 56–60	11–9 (4–1)	Joseph G. Echols Memorial Hall (2,100); Norfolk, VA
01/19/2015; 8:00 pm	North Carolina A&T	W 74–60	12–9 (5–1)	Joseph G. Echols Memorial Hall (1,640); Norfolk, VA
01/24/2015; 6:00 pm	at South Carolina State	W 76–63	13–9 (6–1)	SHM Memorial Center (575); Orangeburg, SC
01/26/2015; 8:00 pm	at Savannah State	W 70–54	14–9 (7–1)	Tiger Arena (2,390); Savannah, GA
01/31/2015; 6:00 pm	Hampton	W 63–60	15–9 (8–1)	Joseph G. Echols Memorial Hall (4,953); Norfolk, VA
02/07/2015; 6:00 pm	Howard	W 72–69	16–9 (9–1)	Joseph G. Echols Memorial Hall (2,702); Norfolk, VA
02/09/2015; 8:00 pm	Maryland Eastern Shore	L 64–82	16–10 (9–2)	Joseph G. Echols Memorial Hall (1,523); Norfolk, VA
02/14/2015; 4:00 pm	at Morgan State	L 70–73	16–11 (9–3)	Talmadge L. Hill Field House (1,569); Baltimore, MD
02/21/2015; 4:00 pm	at Coppin State	W 99–81	17–11 (10–3)	Physical Education Complex (289); Baltimore, MD
02/23/2015; 8:00 pm	Delaware State	W 81–71	18–11 (11–3)	Joseph G. Echols Memorial Hall (2,152); Norfolk, VA
03/02/2015; 8:00 pm	at Howard	L 59–61 ^{OT}	18–12 (11–4)	Burr Gymnasium (635); Washington, D.C.
03/05/2015; 8:00 pm	at Hampton	W 80–69	19–12 (12–4)	Hampton Convocation Center (6,792); Hampton, VA
MEAC tournament
03/11/2015; 8:00 pm, ESPN3	vs. South Carolina State; Quarterfinals	W 68–54	20–12	Norfolk Scope (N/A); Norfolk, VA
03/13/2015; 8:00 pm, ESPN3	vs. Hampton; Semifinals	L 64–75	20–13	Norfolk Scope (N/A); Norfolk, VA
CIT
03/17/2015*; 7:00 pm	at Eastern Kentucky; First round	L 75–81	20–14	McBrayer Arena (2,950); Richmond, KY
*Non-conference game. ^{#}Rankings from AP Poll. (#) Tournament seedings in parentheses. All times are in Eastern Time.
