= 2014–15 North Carolina A&T Aggies men's basketball team =

American college basketball season

2014–15 North Carolina A&T Aggies men's basketball
- Conference: Mid-Eastern Athletic Conference
- Record: 9–23 (6–10 MEAC)
- Head coach: Cy Alexander (3rd season)
- Assistant coaches: Jay Joyner; Darren Corbett; Odell Witherspoon III
- Home arena: Corbett Sports Center

2014–15 MEAC men's basketball standings
	Conf.				Overall
Team	W		L	PCT	W		L	PCT
North Carolina Central	16	–	0	1.000	25	–	8	.758
Norfolk State	12	–	4	.750	20	–	14	.588
Maryland Eastern Shore	11	–	5	.688	18	–	15	.545
Howard	10	–	6	.625	16	–	16	.500
Delaware State	9	–	7	.563	18	–	18	.500
Hampton †	8	–	8	.500	17	–	18	.486
South Carolina State	7	–	9	.438	11	–	22	.333
Bethune–Cookman	7	–	9	.438	11	–	21	.344
Coppin State	6	–	10	.375	8	–	23	.258
North Carolina A&T	6	–	10	.375	9	–	23	.281
Morgan State	5	–	11	.313	7	–	24	.226
Savannah State	5	–	11	.313	9	–	22	.290
Florida A&M	2	–	14	.125	2	–	27	.069
† 2015 MEAC tournament winner

The 2014–15 North Carolina A&T Aggies men's basketball team represented North Carolina Agricultural and Technical State University during the 2014–15 NCAA Division I men's basketball season. The Aggies, led by third year head coach Cy Alexander, played their home games at the Corbett Sports Center and were members of the Mid-Eastern Athletic Conference. They finished the season 9–23, 6–10 in MEAC play to finish in a tie for ninth place. They lost in the first round of the MEAC tournament to South Carolina State.

== Roster ==
Number	Name	Position	Height	Weight	Year	Hometown
0	Jerome Simmons	Center/Forward	6–8	225	Sophomore	Jacksonville, North Carolina
1	Trey Brown	Guard	6–3	195	Sophomore	Hampton, Virginia
1	Julien Johnson	Forward	6–4	185	Sophomore	Nags Head, North Carolina
2	Sam Hunt	Guard	6–2	175	Sophomore	Greensboro, North Carolina
3	Jamin Lackey	Forward	6–8	200	Sophomore	Los Angeles, California
5	Bryan Akinkugbe	Center	6–9	225	Senior	Bowie, Maryland
10	Arturs Bremers	Guard	6–3	195	Junior	Sigulda, Latvia
10	James Whitaker	Guard	6–5	180	RS–Freshman	Portsmouth, Virginia
12	Ahmad Abdullah	Guard	6–0	175	Junior	Raleigh, North Carolina
20	Austin Williams	Guard	6–1	175	Freshman	Queens, New York
21	Nick Reese	Forward	6–7	210	RS–Freshman	Los Angeles, California
23	Denzel Keyes	Guard	6–4	210	Sophomore	Kinston, North Carolina
32	Bruce Beckford	Forward	6–7	215	Junior	Silver Spring, Maryland
33	Waylan Siverand	Forward	6–7	190	Senior	Houston, Texas
34	Khary Doby	Forward	6–6	206	Sophomore	Marlboro, Maryland
44	Steven Burrough	Center	6–9	245	Sophomore	Charlotte, North Carolina

== Schedule ==
Date time, TV	Opponent	Result	Record	Site (attendance) city, state
Regular season
11/14/2014*; 8:00 pm	Greensboro College	W 91–61	1–0	Corbett Sports Center (1,057); Greensboro, NC
11/17/2014*; 7:30 pm	USC Upstate	L 46–63	1–1	Corbett Sports Center (816); Greensboro, NC
11/19/2014*; 7:00 pm, ESPN3	at Northern Kentucky	L 55–68	1–2	The Bank of Kentucky Center (1,505); Highland Heights, KY
11/23/2014*; 7:00 pm	at Bradley; Corpus Christi Coastal Classic	L 50–58	1–3	Carver Arena (6,039); Peoria, IL
11/25/2014*; 8:00 pm	at Saint Louis; Corpus Christi Coastal Classic	L 54–57	1–4	Chaifetz Arena (4,507); St. Louis, MO
11/28/2014*; 5:00 pm	vs. Radford; Corpus Christi Coastal Classic	L 50–58	1–5	American Bank Center (6,039); Corpus Christi, TX
11/29/2014*; 11:30 am	vs. Mississippi Valley State; Corpus Christi Coastal Classic	L 63–66	1–6	American Bank Center (N/A); Corpus Christi, TX
12/04/2014*; 7:30 pm	at USC Upstate	L 54–65	1–7	Hodge Center (688); Spartanburg, SC
12/06/2014; 2:00 pm	at Howard	L 47–54	1–8 (0–1)	Burr Gymnasium (N/A); Washington, D.C.
12/08/2014; 7:30 pm	at Maryland Eastern Shore	L 58–69	1–9 (0–2)	Hytche Athletic Center (2,847); Princess Anne, MD
12/14/2014*; 2:00 pm	at Old Dominion	L 48–85	1–10	Ted Constant Convocation Center (5,594); Norfolk, VA
12/17/2014*; 7:00 pm, BTN	at No. 12 Ohio State	L 55–97	1–11	Value City Arena (14,585); Columbus, OH
12/19/2014*; 7:00 pm	at Kent State	L 57–71	1–12	MAC Center (1,817); Kent, OH
12/28/2014*; 3:00 pm	North Carolina Wesleyan	W 58–54	2–12	Corbett Sports Center (784); Greensboro, NC
12/30/2014*; 7:00 pm, SECN+	at South Carolina	L 54–91	2–13	Colonial Life Arena (8,156); Columbia, SC
01/03/2015*; 7:00 pm	Cal State Bakersfield	W 83–70	3–13	Corbett Sports Center (659); Greensboro, NC
01/10/2015; 6:00 pm	Savannah State	W 68–47	4–13 (1–2)	Corbett Sports Center (932); Greensboro, NC
01/12/2015; 7:30 pm	South Carolina State	L 50–52	4–14 (1–3)	Corbett Sports Center (1,827); Greensboro, NC
01/17/2015; 6:00 pm	at Hampton	W 64–61	5–14 (2–3)	Hampton Convocation Center (4,589); Hampton, VA
01/19/2015; 8:30 pm	at Norfolk State	L 60–74	5–15 (2–4)	Joseph G. Echols Memorial Hall (1,640); Norfolk, VA
01/24/2015; 6:00 pm, ESPN3	Delaware State	L 52–67	5–16 (2–5)	Corbett Sports Center (1,040); Greensboro, NC
01/26/2015; 7:30 pm	Coppin State	L 71–84	5–17 (2–6)	Corbett Sports Center (1,294); Greensboro, NC
01/31/2015; 6:00 pm	at Savannah State	W 62–59	6–17 (3–6)	Tiger Arena (1,755); Savannah, GA
02/04/2015*; 7:00 pm	at Charlotte	L 61–77	6–18	Dale F. Halton Arena (3,918); Charlotte, NC
02/07/2015; 6:00 pm	North Carolina Central	L 44–58	6–19 (3–7)	Corbett Sports Center (5,700); Greensboro, NC
02/14/2015; 6:00 pm	at Florida A&M	L 50–57	6–20 (3–8)	Teaching Gym (539); Tallahassee, FL
02/16/2015; 7:00 pm	at Bethune-Cookman	L 56–77	6–21 (3–9)	Moore Gymnasium (602); Daytona Beach, FL
02/23/2015; 7:30 pm	Morgan State	W 60–57 ^{OT}	7–21 (4–9)	Corbett Sports Center (1,097); Greensboro, NC
02/28/2015; 6:00 pm	Florida A&M	W 77–65	8–21 (5–9)	Corbett Sports Center (823); Greensboro, NC
03/02/2015; 7:30 pm	Bethune-Cookman	W 67–50	9–21 (6–9)	Corbett Sports Center (903); Greensboro, NC
03/05/2015; 7:30 pm	at North Carolina Central	L 58–69	9–22 (6–10)	McLendon–McDougald Gymnasium (3,116); Durham, NC
MEAC tournament
03/10/2015; 8:00 pm	vs. South Carolina State; First round	L 54–63	9–23	Norfolk Scope; Norfolk, VA
*Non-conference game. ^{#}Rankings from AP Poll. (#) Tournament seedings in parentheses. All times are in Eastern Time.
