= 2015 MEAC men's basketball tournament =

- Classification: Division I
- Season: 2014–15
- Teams: 12
- Site: Norfolk Scope; Norfolk, Virginia
- Champions: Hampton (5th title)
- Winning coach: Edward Joyner (2nd title)
- Television: ESPN2

2014–15 MEAC men's basketball standings
	Conf.				Overall
Team	W		L	PCT	W		L	PCT
North Carolina Central	16	–	0	1.000	25	–	8	.758
Norfolk State	12	–	4	.750	20	–	14	.588
Maryland Eastern Shore	11	–	5	.688	18	–	15	.545
Howard	10	–	6	.625	16	–	16	.500
Delaware State	9	–	7	.563	18	–	18	.500
Hampton †	8	–	8	.500	17	–	18	.486
South Carolina State	7	–	9	.438	11	–	22	.333
Bethune–Cookman	7	–	9	.438	11	–	21	.344
Coppin State	6	–	10	.375	8	–	23	.258
North Carolina A&T	6	–	10	.375	9	–	23	.281
Morgan State	5	–	11	.313	7	–	24	.226
Savannah State	5	–	11	.313	9	–	22	.290
Florida A&M	2	–	14	.125	2	–	27	.069
† 2015 MEAC tournament winner

The 2015 Mid-Eastern Athletic Conference men's basketball tournament took place March 9–14, at the Norfolk Scope in Norfolk, Virginia. 2015 marked the third year in Norfolk after the last eight years in Winston-Salem, North Carolina. The top 12 teams in the final standings qualified for the tournament. The champion received a bid to the 2015 NCAA tournament. Florida A&M was ineligible for postseason play due to failing to meet the academic requirements.

== Seeds ==
Seed	School	Conference	Overall
1	North Carolina Central	16–0	24–6
2	Norfolk State	12–4	19–12
3	Maryland Eastern Shore	11–5	18–13
4	Howard	10–6	16–15
5	Delaware State	9–7	15–16
6	Hampton	8–8	12–17
7	South Carolina State	7–9	10–21
8	Bethune-Cookman	7–9	11–20
9	Coppin State	6–10	7–22
10	North Carolina A&T	6–10	9–22
11	Morgan State	5–11	7–23
12	Savannah State	5–11	9–21
‡ – MEAC regular season champions. † – Received a bye in the conference tournament. Overall records are as of the end of the regular season.

== Bracket ==
First round March 9 & March 10
8	Bethune-Cookman	60
9	Coppin State	64
5	Delaware State	64
12	Savannah State	58
7	South Carolina State	63
10	North Carolina A&T	54
6	Hampton	91
11	Morgan State	71

Quarterfinals; March 11 & March 12
1	North Carolina Central	91
9	Coppin State	43
4	Howard	59
5	Delaware State	65
2	Norfolk State	64
7	South Carolina State	58
3	Maryland Eastern Shore	71
6	Hampton	76

Semifinals; March 13
1	North Carolina Central	57
5	Delaware State	63
2	Norfolk State	64
6	Hampton	75

Championship Game; March 14
5	Delaware State	61
6	Hampton	82
