= 2014–15 Hampton Pirates basketball team =

American college basketball season

2014–15 Hampton Pirates men's basketball
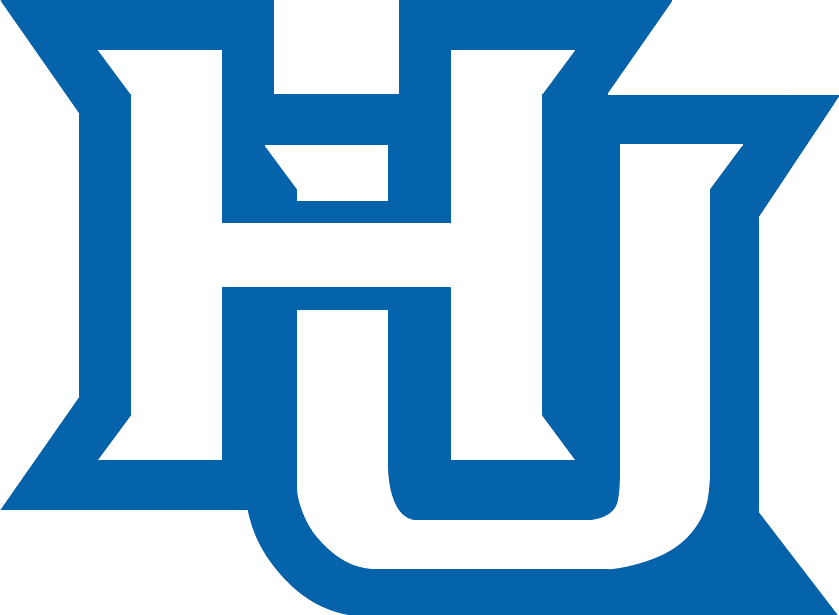

MEAC tournament champions

NCAA tournament, Round of 64
- Conference: Mid-Eastern Athletic Conference
- Record: 17–18 (8–8 MEAC)
- Head coach: Edward Joyner (6th season)
- Assistant coaches: Darryl Sharp; Akeem Miskdeen; DeMarco Johnson
- Home arena: Hampton Convocation Center

2014–15 MEAC men's basketball standings
	Conf.				Overall
Team	W		L	PCT	W		L	PCT
North Carolina Central	16	–	0	1.000	25	–	8	.758
Norfolk State	12	–	4	.750	20	–	14	.588
Maryland Eastern Shore	11	–	5	.688	18	–	15	.545
Howard	10	–	6	.625	16	–	16	.500
Delaware State	9	–	7	.563	18	–	18	.500
Hampton †	8	–	8	.500	17	–	18	.486
South Carolina State	7	–	9	.438	11	–	22	.333
Bethune–Cookman	7	–	9	.438	11	–	21	.344
Coppin State	6	–	10	.375	8	–	23	.258
North Carolina A&T	6	–	10	.375	9	–	23	.281
Morgan State	5	–	11	.313	7	–	24	.226
Savannah State	5	–	11	.313	9	–	22	.290
Florida A&M	2	–	14	.125	2	–	27	.069
† 2015 MEAC tournament winner

The 2014–15 Hampton Pirates men's basketball team represented Hampton University during the 2014–15 NCAA Division I men's basketball season. The Pirates, led by sixth-year head coach Edward Joyner, played their home games at the Hampton Convocation Center and were members of the Mid-Eastern Athletic Conference (MEAC). They finished the season 17–18, 8–8 in MEAC play, to finish in sixth place. They defeated Morgan State, Maryland Eastern Shore, Norfolk State and Delaware State to become champions of the MEAC tournament. They received an automatic bid to the NCAA tournament where they defeated Manhattan in the First Four before losing in the second round to Kentucky.

== Roster ==
Number	Name	Position	Height	Weight	Year	Hometown
0	Donald Ralls	Guard	6'0"	185	Freshman	Philadelphia, PA
1	Keith Carroll	Guard	5'11"	160	Freshman	Santa Clarita, CA
2	Breon Key	Guard	6'2"	185	Junior	Hampton, VA
3	Quinton Chievous	Guard	6'6"	215	Junior	Chicago, IL
4	Lawrence Cooks	Guard	6'1"	175	Sophomore	Charlotte, NC
11	Deron Powers	Guard	5'11"	165	Senior	Williamsburg, VA
13	Gregory Hayden	Guard	5'7"	160	Sophomore	Dallas, TX
14	Brian Darden	Guard	6'2"	183	Junior	Hampton, VA
21	Ke'Ron Brown	Guard	6'3"	215	Junior	Savannah, GA
23	Dwight Meikle	Guard	6'7"	210	Junior	Baltimore, MD
30	Jervon Pressley	Forward	6'8"	250	Junior	Charlotte, NC
31	Charles Wilson-Fisher	Forward	6'9"	205	Freshman	Alpharetta, GA
32	Dionte Adams	Forward	6'7"	215	Junior	Charlotte, NC
33	Phillip Reed	Center	6'10"	210	Sophomore	Oxnard, CA
34	Reginald Johnson	Guard	6'2"	190	Junior	Chicago, IL
	Rasheed Stanley	Center	7'0"	290	Freshman	Duluth, GA

== Schedule ==
Date time, TV	Rank^{#}	Opponent^{#}	Result	Record	Site (attendance) city, state
Regular season
November 14, 2014*; 9:30 p.m., ESPN3		at Iowa; 2K Sports Classic	L 56–90	0–1	Carver–Hawkeye Arena (14,682); Iowa City, IA
November 16, 2014*; 4:00 p.m., ESPNU		at No. 23 Syracuse; 2K Sports Classic	L 47–65	0–2	Carrier Dome (22,848); Syracuse, NY
November 21, 2014*; 5:30 p.m.		vs. Alcorn State; 2K Sports Classic	W 82–69	1–2	Scheels Arena (2,014); Fargo, ND
November 22, 2014*; 8:00 p.m.		at North Dakota State; 2K Sports Classic	L 66–74	1–3	Scheels Arena (1,437); Fargo, ND
November 24, 2014*; 7:00 p.m.		at Appalachian State	L 74–82	1–4	Holmes Center (1,539); Boone, NC
November 26, 2014*; 2:00 p.m.		American	L 60–64	1–5	Hampton Convocation Center (1,000); Hampton, VA
December 2, 2014*; 8:00 p.m.		at Tennessee State	W 62–54	2–5	Gentry Complex (1,221); Nashville, TN
December 6, 2014; 6:00 p.m.		Coppin State	W 71–52	4–5 (1–0)	Hampton Convocation Center (2,000); Hampton, VA
December 8, 2014; 8:00 p.m.		Morgan State	W 62–58	4–5 (2–0)	Hampton Convocation Center (3,500); Hampton, VA
December 17, 2014*; 7:00 p.m., ESPNU		at Illinois	L 55–73	4–6	State Farm Center (12,564); Champaign, IL
December 19, 2014*; 7:00 p.m.		Tennessee State	W 66–54	5–6	Hampton Convocation Center (2,000); Hampton, VA
December 21, 2014*; 4:00 p.m.		Northern Arizona	W 75–66	6–6	Hampton Convocation Center (3,000); Hampton, VA
December 29, 2014*; 8:00 p.m., ESPN3		at Northern Illinois	L 51–83	6–7	Convocation Center (802); DeKalb, IL
January 3, 2015*; 4:00 p.m.		at USC Upstate	L 54–68	6–8	Hodge Center (688); Spartanburg, SC
January 10, 2015; 4:00 p.m.		at Bethune–Cookman	W 58–56	7–8 (3–0)	Moore Gymnasium (757); Daytona Beach, FL
January 12, 2015; 8:00 p.m.		at Florida A&M	W 78–63	8–8 (4–0)	Teaching Gym (343); Tallahassee, FL
January 17, 2015; 6:00 p.m.		North Carolina A&T	L 61–64	8–9 (4–1)	Hampton Convocation Center (4,589); Hampton, VA
January 19, 2015*; 8:00 p.m.		North Carolina Central	L 52–59	8–10 (4–2)	Hampton Convocation Center (5,045); Hampton, VA
January 24, 2015; 6:00 p.m.		at Savannah State	L 66–68	8–11 (4–3)	Tiger Arena (2,755); Savannah, GA
January 26, 2015; 7:30 p.m.		at South Carolina State	L 56–65	8–12 (4–4)	SHM Memorial Center (707); Orangeburg, SC
January 31, 2015; 6:00 p.m.		at Norfolk State	L 60–63	8–13 (4–5)	Joseph G. Echols Memorial Hall (4,953); Norfolk, VA
February 2, 2015*; 7:00 p.m.		at NJIT	L 67–86	8–14	Fleisher Center (511); Newark, NJ
February 7, 2015*; 6:00 p.m.		Maryland Eastern Shore	W 64–61	9–14 (5–5)	Hampton Convocation Center (4,561); Hampton, VA
February 9, 2015*; 8:00 p.m.		Howard	W 73–69 ^{OT}	10–14 (6–5)	Hampton Convocation Center (4,562); Hampton, VA
February 16, 2015; 9:00 p.m.		at Morgan State	W 93–65	11–14 (7–5)	Talmadge L. Hill Field House (1,175); Baltimore, MD
February 21, 2015*; 6:00 p.m.		Delaware State	L 71–74	11–15 (7–6)	Hampton Convocation Center (4,391); Hampton, VA
February 28, 2015; 4:00 p.m.		at Howard	W 68–67	12–15 (8–6)	Burr Gymnasium (2,700); Washington, D.C.
March 2, 2015; 7:30 p.m.		at Delaware State	L 75–85	12–16 (8–7)	Memorial Hall (1,687); Dover, DE
March 5, 2015*; 8:00 p.m.		Norfolk State	L 69–80	12–17 (8–8)	Hampton Convocation Center (6,792); Hampton, VA
MEAC tournament
March 9, 2015; 9:00 p.m., ESPN3		vs. Morgan State; First round	W 91–71	13–17	Norfolk Scope (3,111); Norfolk, VA
March 12, 2015; 6:00 p.m., ESPN3		vs. Maryland Eastern Shore; Quarterfinals	W 76–71	14–17	Norfolk Scope (N/A); Norfolk, VA
March 13, 2015; 8:20 p.m., ESPN3		vs. Norfolk State; Semifinals	W 75–64	15–17	Norfolk Scope (N/A); Norfolk, VA
March 14, 2015; 1:00 p.m., ESPN2		vs. Delaware State; Championship game	W 82–61	16–17	Norfolk Scope (N/A); Norfolk, VA
NCAA tournament
March 17, 2015*; 6:40 p.m., truTV	(16 MW)	vs. (16 MW) Manhattan; First Four	W 74–64	17–17	UD Arena (12,124); Dayton, OH
March 19, 2015*; 9:40 p.m., CBS	(16 MW)	vs. (1 MW) No. 1 Kentucky; Second round	L 56–79	17–18	KFC Yum! Center (21,639); Louisville, KY
*Non-conference game. ^{#}Rankings from AP poll. (#) Tournament seedings in parentheses. MW=Midwest Region. All times are in Eastern.
