= 2014–15 Maryland Eastern Shore Hawks men's basketball team =

American college basketball season

2014–15 Maryland Eastern Shore Hawks men's basketball
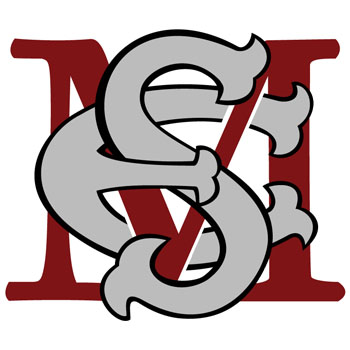

CIT, First round
- Conference: Mid-Eastern Athletic Conference
- Record: 18–15 (11–5 MEAC)
- Head coach: Bobby Collins (1st season)
- Assistant coaches: Clifford Reed; Ace Custis; Trevor Deloach
- Home arena: Hytche Athletic Center

2014–15 MEAC men's basketball standings
	Conf.				Overall
Team	W		L	PCT	W		L	PCT
North Carolina Central	16	–	0	1.000	25	–	8	.758
Norfolk State	12	–	4	.750	20	–	14	.588
Maryland Eastern Shore	11	–	5	.688	18	–	15	.545
Howard	10	–	6	.625	16	–	16	.500
Delaware State	9	–	7	.563	18	–	18	.500
Hampton †	8	–	8	.500	17	–	18	.486
South Carolina State	7	–	9	.438	11	–	22	.333
Bethune–Cookman	7	–	9	.438	11	–	21	.344
Coppin State	6	–	10	.375	8	–	23	.258
North Carolina A&T	6	–	10	.375	9	–	23	.281
Morgan State	5	–	11	.313	7	–	24	.226
Savannah State	5	–	11	.313	9	–	22	.290
Florida A&M	2	–	14	.125	2	–	27	.069
† 2015 MEAC tournament winner

The 2014–15 Maryland Eastern Shore Hawks men's basketball team represented the University of Maryland Eastern Shore during the 2014–15 NCAA Division I men's basketball season. The Hawks, led by first-year head coach Bobby Collins, played their home games at the Hytche Athletic Center and were members of the Mid-Eastern Athletic Conference. They finished the season 18–15, 11–5 in MEAC play to finish in third place. They lost in the quarterfinals of the MEAC tournament to Hampton. They were invited to the CollegeInsider.com Tournament, where they lost in the first round to High Point.

== Roster ==
Number	Name	Position	Height	Weight	Year	Hometown
0	Ryan Andino	Guard	6–2	175	Freshman	Ft. Lauderdale, Florida
1	Iman Johnson	Forward	6–5	215	Junior	Milwaukee, Wisconsin
2	Ishaq Pitt	Guard	6–3	210	Senior	Brooklyn, New York
3	Mark Blackmon	Guard	5–9	170	Sophomore	Charlotte, North Carolina
4	Devin Martin	Guard	6–4	205	Junior	Baltimore, Maryland
5	Stephen Spurlock	Guard/forward	6–6	215	Freshman	Cedar Hill, Texas
10	Travis Trim	Guard	6–1	180	Junior	Port of Spain, Trinidad and Tobago
11	Devon Walker	Guard	6–4	215	Senior	Philadelphia
12	Shane Randall	Guard	6–5	210	Sophomore	Philadelphia
13	Issac Smith III	Guard	6–1	170	Senior	Chicago, Illinois
14	William Tibbs	Guard/forward	6–6	195	Freshman	Winston-Salem, North Carolina
21	Jaiquan Manning	Guard	6–0	170	Freshman	Fayetteville, North Carolina
24	Mike Myers	Forward	6–9	245	Senior	Camden, New Jersey
25	Joshu's Warren	Forward	6–8	245	Junior	Marietta, Georgia
32	Dominique Elliott	Forward	6–8	260	Junior	Savannah, Georgia

== Schedule ==
Date time, TV	Opponent	Result	Record	Site (attendance) city, state
Exhibition
11/11/2014*; 7:30 pm	Salisbury	W 70–51		Hytche Athletic Center (2,921); Princess Anne, Maryland
Regular season
11/14/2014*; 7:00 pm, ESPN3	at Virginia Tech	L 46–71	0–1	Cassell Coliseum (6,191); Blacksburg, Virginia
11/17/2014*; 7:00 pm, FS1	at No. 12 Villanova; Legends Classic	L 44–81	0–2	The Pavilion (6,500); Villanova, Pennsylvania
11/19/2014*; 7:00 pm	at Mount St. Mary's	W 53–41	1–2	Knott Arena (1,315); Emmitsburg, Maryland
11/20/2014*; 7:00 pm, WTVR	at No. 15 VCU; Legends Classic	L 66–106	1–3	Siegel Center (7,637); Richmond, Virginia
11/22/2014*; 4:00 pm	at Saint Francis (PA)	L 53–57	1–4	DeGol Arena (910); Loretto, Pennsylvania
11/24/2014*; 4:30 pm	vs. Detroit; Legends Classic	L 55–69	1–5	Savage Arena (4,419); Toledo, Ohio
11/25/2014*; 4:30 pm	vs. Bucknell; Legends Classic	L 55–58	1–6	Savage Arena (4,148); Toledo, Ohio
11/29/2014*; 4:00 pm	at Fordham	W 72–66	2–6	Rose Hill Gymnasium (2,132); Bronx, New York
12/02/2014*; 7:30 pm	UMBC	W 65–52	3–6	Hytche Athletic Center (2,036); Princess Anne, Maryland
12/05/2014; 7:00 pm	North Carolina Central	L 63–68	3–7 (0–1)	Hytche Athletic Center (2,874); Princess Anne, Maryland
12/08/2014; 7:30 pm	North Carolina A&T	W 69–58	4–7 (1–1)	Hytche Athletic Center (2,847); Princess Anne, Maryland
12/13/2014*; 7:30 pm	Navy	W 53–46	5–7	Hytche Athletic Center (457); Princess Anne, Maryland
12/19/2014*; 7:00 pm	at Old Dominion	L 43–60	5–8	Constant Center (5,210); Norfolk, Virginia
12/22/2014*; 7:00 pm	at St. Bonaventure	W 82–80	6–8	Reilly Center (3,293); Olean, New York
12/28/2014*; 2:00 pm	at Duquesne	W 78–69	7–8	Palumbo Center (1,459); Pittsburgh
12/30/2014*; 6:30 pm	at UT Martin	W 63–60	8–8	Skyhawk Arena (917); Martin, Tennessee
01/07/2015*; 7:00 pm	at NJIT	L 60–69	8–9	Fleisher Center (776); Newark, New Jersey
01/12/2015; 7:30 pm	at Morgan State	W 78–53	9–9 (2–1)	Talmadge L. Hill Field House (1,117); Baltimore
01/17/2015; 4:00 pm	Savannah State	W 87–57	10–9 (3–1)	Hytche Athletic Center (930); Princess Anne, Maryland
01/19/2015; 7:30 pm	South Carolina State	L 72–73 ^{OT}	10–10 (3–2)	Hytche Athletic Center (793); Princess Anne, Maryland
01/24/2015; 4:00 pm	at Bethune-Cookman	W 74–70	11–10 (4–2)	Moore Gymnasium (726); Daytona Beach, Florida
01/26/2015; 7:30 pm	at Florida A&M	W 72–65	12–10 (5–2)	Teaching Gym (607); Tallahassee, Florida
01/31/2015; 4:00 pm	Coppin State	W 92–82	13–10 (6–2)	Hytche Athletic Center (2,871); Princess Anne, Maryland
02/02/2015; 7:30 pm	at Howard	L 74–83	13–11 (6–3)	Burr Gymnasium (N/A); Washington, D.C.
02/07/2015; 6:00 pm	at Hampton	L 61–64	13–12 (6–4)	Hampton Convocation Center (4,561); Hampton, Virginia
02/09/2015; 8:00 pm	at Norfolk State	W 82–64	14–12 (7–4)	Joseph G. Echols Memorial Hall (1,523); Norfolk, Virginia
02/14/2015; 4:00 pm	Delaware State	L 85–91	14–13 (7–5)	Hytche Athletic Center (5,411); Princess Anne, Maryland
02/16/2015; 7:30 pm	Howard	W 71–60	15–13 (8–5)	Hytche Athletic Center (1,015); Princess Anne, Maryland
02/21/2015; 6:00 pm	at South Carolina State	W 68–56	16–13 (9–5)	SHM Memorial Center (935); Orangeburg, South Carolina
02/28/2015; 4:00 pm	at Delaware State	W 69–65	17–13 (10–5)	Memorial Hall (1,738); Dover, Delaware
03/05/2015; 7:30 pm	Morgan State	W 89–76	18–13 (11–5)	Hytche Athletic Center (2,018); Princess Anne, Maryland
MEAC tournament
03/12/2015; 6:00 pm	vs. Hampton; Quarterfinals	L 71–76	18–14	Norfolk Scope (N/A); Norfolk, Virginia
CIT
03/18/2015*; 7:00 pm	at High Point; First round	L 64–70	18–15	Millis Center (1,197); High Point, North Carolina
*Non-conference game. ^{#}Rankings from AP Poll. (#) Tournament seedings in parentheses. All times are in Eastern Time.
