= 2014–15 Old Dominion Monarchs men's basketball team =

American college basketball season

2014–15 Old Dominion Monarchs men's basketball

NIT, Semifinals
- Conference: Conference USA
- Record: 27–8 (13–5 C-USA)
- Head coach: Jeff Jones (2nd season)
- Assistant coaches: Lamar Barrett (2nd season); John Richardson (8th season); Bryant Stith (2nd season)
- MVP: Trey Freeman
- Captains: Aaron Bacote; Kennan Palmore
- Home arena: Ted Constant Convocation Center

2014–15 Conference USA men's basketball standings
	Conf.				Overall
Team	W		L	PCT	W		L	PCT
Louisiana Tech	15	–	3	.833	27	–	9	.750
Old Dominion	13	–	5	.722	27	–	8	.771
UTEP	13	–	5	.722	22	–	11	.667
WKU	12	–	6	.667	20	–	12	.625
UAB †	12	–	6	.667	20	–	16	.556
Middle Tennessee	9	–	9	.500	19	–	17	.528
FIU	8	–	10	.444	16	–	17	.485
UTSA	8	–	10	.444	14	–	16	.467
North Texas	8	–	10	.444	14	–	17	.452
Rice	8	–	10	.444	12	–	20	.375
Charlotte	7	–	11	.389	14	–	18	.438
Marshall	7	–	11	.389	11	–	21	.344
Southern Miss*	4	–	14	.222	9	–	20	.310
Florida Atlantic	2	–	16	.111	9	–	20	.310
† 2015 C-USA Tournament winner *Ineligible for postseason play due to self-imposed postseason ban

The 2014–15 Old Dominion Monarchs men's basketball team represented Old Dominion University during the 2014–15 NCAA Division I men's basketball season. The Monarchs, led by second year head coach Jeff Jones, played their home games at Ted Constant Convocation Center and were members of the Conference USA. They finished the season 27–8, 13–5 in C-USA play to finish in a tie for second place. They lost in the quarterfinals of the C-USA tournament to Middle Tennessee. They were invited to the National Invitation Tournament where they defeated Charleston Southern in the first round, Illinois State in the second round, and Murray State in the quarterfinals to advance to the semifinals where they lost to Stanford.

== Previous season ==
The Monarchs the season 18–18, 9–7 in C-USA play to finish in sixth place. They advanced to the quarterfinals of the C-USA tournament to Middle Tennessee. They were invited to the College Basketball Invitational where they defeated South Dakota State and Radford to advance to the semifinals where they lost to Fresno State.

== Pre-season ==
=== Departures ===
Name	Number	Pos.	Height	Weight	Year	Hometown	Notes
Dimitri Batten	4	G	6'3"	205	RS Junior	Newport News, VA	Graduate transfer to Boston College
Donte Hill	25	G	6'4"	205	RS Senior	Virginia Beach, VA	Graduated
Sean-Michael King	25	G	6'1"	182	Junior	Alexandria, VA	Walk-on didn't return
Anton Larsen	40	C	7'0"	245	RS Senior	Copenhagen, DK	Graduated

=== Incoming transfers ===
Name	Number	Pos.	Height	Weight	Year	Hometown	Previous School
Javonte Douglas	10	F	6'8"	195	Junior	Charlotte, NC	Junior college transfer from Central Florida Community College
Stephen Vassor	12	G	6'6"	237	Sophomore	Lawrenceville, VA	Transferred from Hampden–Sydney College. Under NCAA transfer rules, Vassor will have to redshirt for the 2014–15 season. Will have three years of remaining eligibility.
Brandon Stith	25	F	6'7"	215	Sophomore	Lawrenceville, VA	Transferred from East Carolina. Under NCAA transfer rules, Stith will have to redshirt for the 2014–15 season. Will have three years of remaining eligibility.
Jonathan Arledge	35	F	6'9"	236	Senior	Silver Spring, MD	Transferred from George Mason. Will be eligible to play immediately since Arledge graduated from George Mason.

=== Incoming recruits ===
College recruiting
Name	Hometown	School	Height	Weight	Commit date
Zoran Talley; SF	Merrillville, IN	Midwest Elite Prep Academy	6 ft 7 in (2.01 m)	185 lb (84 kg)	Mar 15, 2014
Zoran Talley; SF	Recruit ratings: Scout: Rivals: (NR)				
Overall recruit ranking:
Note: In many cases, Scout, Rivals, 247Sports, On3, and ESPN may conflict in their listings of height and weight.; In these cases, the average was taken. ESPN grades are on a 100-point scale.; Sources: "2014 Team Ranking". Rivals.

== Roster ==
2014–15 Old Dominion Monarchs men's basketball team
Players
Coaches

Pos.	#	Name	Height	Weight	Year	Previous school	Hometown
G	0	Jordan Baker	6 ft 2 in (1.88 m)	205 lb (93 kg)	So	Hampton HS	Hampton, VA
G	1	Aaron Bacote (C)	6 ft 4 in (1.93 m)	186 lb (84 kg)	Jr	Bethel HS	Hampton, VA
G	2	Martin Shaw (W)	5 ft 11 in (1.8 m)	171 lb (78 kg)	Jr	Kecoughtan HS	Hampton, VA
G	3	Keenan Palmore (C)	6 ft 1 in (1.85 m)	185 lb (84 kg)	Jr	The Paideia School	Stone Mountain, GA
F	10	Javonte Douglas	6 ft 7 in (2.01 m)	200 lb (91 kg)	Jr	Kennedy Charter HS; College of Central Florida	Charlotte, NC
F	11	Josue Ebondo	6 ft 7 in (2.01 m)	221 lb (100 kg)	Sr	Euless Trinity HS; Garden City CC	Euless, TX
G	12	Stephen Vassor (W) (redshirt)	6 ft 6 in (1.98 m)	237 lb (108 kg)	So	Brunswick HS; Hampden–Sydney College	Lawrenceville, VA
G	15	Deion Clark	6 ft 3 in (1.91 m)	210 lb (95 kg)	RS So	Barron Collier HS	Naples, FL
G	20	Trey Freeman	6 ft 2 in (1.88 m)	175 lb (79 kg)	RS Jr	Kellam HS; Campbell	Virginia Beach, VA
F	21	Denzell Taylor	6 ft 7 in (2.01 m)	226 lb (103 kg)	So	St. Benedict's Prep	Brampton, ON
G	22	Ambrose Mosley	6 ft 2 in (1.88 m)	170 lb (77 kg)	RS So	Hargrave Military Academy	Jacksonville, FL
F	23	Richard Ross	6 ft 6 in (1.98 m)	225 lb (102 kg)	RS Sr	Hirschi HS	Wichita Falls, TX
F	24	Zoran Talley	6 ft 7 in (2.01 m)	195 lb (88 kg)	Fr	Merrillville HS	Merrillville, IN
F	25	Brandan Stith (I) (redshirt)	6 ft 7 in (2.01 m)	230 lb (104 kg)	So	Brunswick HS; East Carolina	Lawrenceville, VA
F	30	Nik Biberaj (W)	6 ft 8 in (2.03 m)	245 lb (111 kg)	RS Jr	South County HS; Christopher Newport	Fairfax Station, VA
F/C	35	Jonathan Arledge	6 ft 9 in (2.06 m)	235 lb (107 kg)	Sr	KIMA HS; George Mason	Silver Spring, MD

Head coach

- Jeff Jones (Virginia)

Assistant coach(es)

- Lamar Barrett (Elizabeth City State)
- John Richardson (Elizabeth City State)
- Bryant Stith (Virginia)

Legend

- (C) Team captain
- (S) Suspended
- (I) Ineligible
- (W) Walk-on
- Injured
- Current redshirt

Roster
Last update: 01/06/15

=== Depth chart ===
Pos.	Starting 5	Bench 1	Bench 2
F/C	Jonathan Arledge	Denzell Taylor
F	Richard Ross	Nik Biberaj	Joe Ebondo
G/F	Jordan Baker	Javonte Douglas
G	Aaron Bacote	Ambrose Mosley	Deion Clark
PG	Trey Freeman	Keenan Palmore

== Schedule ==
Date time, TV	Rank^{#}	Opponent^{#}	Result	Record	High points	High rebounds	High assists	Site (attendance) city, state
Exhibition
11/10/2014*; 7:00 pm		Mount Olive	W 76–61	–	17 – 2 tied	9 – Ross	4 – Freeman	Ted Constant Convocation Center (5,376); Norfolk, VA
Non-conference regular season
11/15/2014*; 7:00 pm		UNC Wilmington	W 76–56	1–0	23 – Freeman (1)	12 – Taylor (1)	4 – 2 tied	Ted Constant Convocation Center (6,619); Norfolk, VA
11/18/2014*; 8:00 pm, ASN		Richmond	W 63–57	2–0	13 – Freeman (2)	6 – 2 tied	4 – Freeman (2)	Ted Constant Convocation Center (6,608); Norfolk, VA
11/21/2014*; 6:30 pm, CBSSN		vs. LSU; Paradise Jam quarterfinals	W 70–61	3–0	25 – Freeman (3)	12 – Arledge (1)	3 – 2 tied	Sports and Fitness Center (1,910); St. Thomas, VI
11/23/2014*; 9:00 pm, CBSSN		vs. Illinois State; Paradise Jam semifinals	L 45–64	3–1	16 – Freeman (4)	5 – Ross (1)	3 – 2 tied	Sports and Fitness Center (2,005); St. Thomas, VI
11/24/2014*; 6:30 pm, CBSSN		vs. Gardner–Webb; Paradise Jam third-place game	W 58–46	4–1	22 – Freeman (5)	7 – Ross (2)	1 – 4 tied	Sports and Fitness Center (2,955); St. Thomas, VI
11/29/2014*; 2:00 pm		No. 14 VCU; Rivalry	W 73–67	5–1	31 – Bacote (1)	6 – Ross (3)	3 – 2 tied	Ted Constant Convocation Center (8,472); Norfolk, VA
12/03/2014*; 7:30 pm		at George Mason	W 75–69	6–1	21 – Mosley (1)	14 – Ross (4)	6 – Freeman (6)	Patriot Center (5,022); Fairfax, VA
12/14/2014*; 2:00 pm		North Carolina A&T	W 85–48	7–1	12 – Ross (1)	7 – Freeman (1)	8 – Bacote (3)	Ted Constant Convocation Center (5,594); Norfolk, VA
12/17/2014*; 8:00 pm, ASN		Georgia State	W 58–54 ^{OT}	8–1	21 – Freeman (6)	11 – Ross (5)	4 – Bacote (4)	Ted Constant Convocation Center (5,470); Norfolk, VA
12/19/2014*; 7:00 pm		Maryland Eastern Shore	W 60–43	9–1	12 – 2 tied	11 – Taylor (2)	4 – Freeman (7)	Ted Constant Convocation Center (5,210); Norfolk, VA
12/22/2014*; 7:00 pm		William & Mary; Rivalry	W 69–62	10–1	24 – Freeman (7)	10 – Taylor (3)	4 – 2 tied	Ted Constant Convocation Center (7,796); Norfolk, VA
12/29/2014*; 8:00 pm, ASN		Mount St. Mary's	W 69–35	11–1	16 – Douglas (1)	9 – Douglas (1)	6 – Bacote (6)	Ted Constant Convocation Center (8,152); Norfolk, VA
Conference USA regular season
01/04/2015; 1:00 pm, ASN		at Charlotte	W 61–54	12–1 (1–0)	14 – Freeman (8)	8 – Taylor (4)	6 – Freeman (8)	Dale F. Halton Arena (3,779); Charlotte, NC
01/08/2015; 7:00 pm	No. 25	at Marshall	W 72–51	13–1 (2–0)	13 – Arledge (2)	8 – Freeman (2)	5 – Ross (3)	Cam Henderson Center (4,661); Huntington, WV
01/10/2015; 5:30 pm, ASN	No. 25	at WKU	L 65–72	13–2 (2–1)	20 – Freeman (9)	6 – Arledge (2)	3 – Bacote (7)	E. A. Diddle Arena (5,123); Bowling Green, KY
01/15/2015; 7:00 pm		Rice	W 63–53	14–2 (3–1)	25 – Bacote (3)	11 – Arledge (3)	5 – Freeman (9)	Ted Constant Convocation Center (7,457); Norfolk, VA
01/17/2015; 7:00 pm		North Texas	W 61–50	15–2 (4–1)	18 – Freeman (10)	10 – Ross (6)	3 – Freeman (10)	Ted Constant Convocation Center (8,472); Norfolk, VA
01/22/2015; 8:00 pm, ASN		at Middle Tennessee	L 58–68 ^{OT}	15–3 (4–2)	18 – Freeman (11)	7 – Taylor (4)	5 – Bacote (8)	Murphy Center (4,887); Murfreesboro, TN
01/24/2015; 5:30 pm, ASN		at UAB	L 68–81	15–4 (4–3)	23 – Bacote (4)	5 – Arledge (4)	3 – Freeman (11)	Bartow Arena (4,127); Birmingham, AL
01/29/2015; 7:00 pm		FIU	W 71–56	16–4 (5–3)	17 – 2 tied	7 – Freeman (3)	5 – Freeman (12)	Ted Constant Convocation Center (6,489); Norfolk, VA
01/31/2015; 7:00 pm		Florida Atlantic	W 68–57	17–4 (6–3)	24 – Freeman (13)	7 – Ross (7)	4 – Arledge (1)	Ted Constant Convocation Center (7,453); Norfolk, VA
02/07/2015; 7:00 pm, COX		Charlotte	W 61–57	18–4 (7–3)	14 – Bacote (5)	8 – Ross (8)	5 – Freeman (13)	Ted Constant Convocation Center (7,678); Norfolk, VA
02/12/2015; 8:00 pm, ASN		at UTSA	L 67–72	18–5 (7–4)	19 – Freeman (19)	7 – Baker (2)	4 – Freeman (14)	Convocation Center (1,168); San Antonio, TX
02/14/2015; 9:00 pm		at UTEP	L 47–62	18–6 (7–5)	17 – Arledge (4)	8 – Douglas (2)	3 – Bacote (9)	Don Haskins Center (9,262); El Paso, TX
02/19/2015; 5:30 pm, ASN		Southern Miss	W 64–38	19–6 (8–5)	18 – Freeman (20)	6 – Taylor (5)	4 – 2 tied	Ted Constant Convocation Center (6,177); Norfolk, VA
02/21/2015; 3:00 pm, ASN		Louisiana Tech	W 72–53	20–6 (9–5)	27 – Freeman (21)	9 – Taylor (6)	3 – 4 tied	Ted Constant Convocation Center (8,019); Norfolk, VA
02/26/2015; 8:00 pm		at Rice	W 63–54	21–6 (10–5)	17 – Freeman (22)	11 – Freeman (4)	5 – Freeman (17)	Tudor Fieldhouse (1,506); Houston, TX
02/28/2015; 5:30 pm, ASN		at North Texas	W 70–57	22–6 (11–5)	24 – Freeman (23)	8 – Ross (9)	2 – 2 tied	The Super Pit (2,833); Denton, TX
03/05/2015; 8:00 pm, ASN		Marshall	W 67–50	23–6 (12–5)	21 – Freeman (24)	10 – Ross (10)	5 – Bacote (11)	Ted Constant Convocation Center (7,114); Norfolk, VA
03/07/2015; 5:30 pm, ASN		WKU	W 75–52	24–6 (13–5)	27 – Freeman (25)	9 – Taylor (7)	6 – Freeman (18)	Ted Constant Convocation Center (8,472); Norfolk, VA
Conference USA tournament
03/12/2015; 3:30 pm, ASN		vs. Middle Tennessee; Quarterfinals	L 52–59	24–7	22 – Freeman (26)	7 – Freeman (5)	4 – Freeman (19)	Birmingham–Jefferson Convention Complex (4,339); Birmingham, AL
NIT
03/18/2015*; 7:15 pm, ESPN3	No. (1)	(8) Charleston Southern; First round	W 65–56	25–7	22 – Arledge (5)	11 – Freeman (6)	10 – Freeman (20)	Ted Constant Convocation Center (4,736); Norfolk, VA
03/23/2015*; 8:00 pm, ESPNU	No. (1)	(4) Illinois State; Second round	W 50–49	26–7	11 – Palmore (1)	9 – Palmore (1)	3 – 2 tied	Ted Constant Convocation Center (5,923); Norfolk, VA
03/25/2015*; 7:00 pm, ESPN2	No. (1)	(3) Murray State; Quarterfinals	W 72–69	27–7	25 – Freeman (27)	8 – Ross (11)	5 – Taylor (4)	Ted Constant Convocation Center (8,161); Norfolk, VA
03/31/2015*; 9:00 pm, ESPN	No. (1)	vs. (2) Stanford; Semifinals	L 60–67	27–8	6 – Mosley (2)	6 – Douglas (3)	3 – 3 tied	Madison Square Garden (7,185); New York, NY
*Non-conference game. ^{#}Rankings from AP Poll. (#) Tournament seedings in parentheses. All times are in Eastern Time. (#) during NIT is seed within region.

== Statistics ==
The team posted the following statistics:

Name	GP	GS	Min.	Avg.	FG	FGA	FG%	3FG	3FGA	3FG%	FT	FTA	FT%	OR	DR	RB	Avg.	Ast.	Avg.	PF	DQ	TO	Stl.	Blk.	Pts.	Avg.
Trey Freeman	35	35	1131	32.3	221	502	0.440	47	132	0.356	102	140	0.729	20	132	152	4.3	125	3.6	54	0	59	46	4	591	16.9
Aaron Bacote	35	35	955	27.3	101	267	0.378	38	120	0.317	103	122	0.844	23	84	107	3.1	95	2.7	58	0	47	24	1	343	9.8
Jonathan Arledge	35	35	704	20.1	115	264	0.436	16	60	0.267	60	98	0.612	63	108	171	4.9	21	0.6	89	1	49	20	19	306	8.7
Richard Ross	35	26	883	25.2	132	222	0.595	0	0	0.000	24	50	0.480	73	123	196	5.6	42	1.2	69	1	54	26	54	288	8.2
Ambrose Mosley	35	0	786	22.5	81	229	0.354	63	186	0.339	24	33	0.727	13	57	70	2.0	29	0.8	52	0	24	16	1	249	7.1
Jordan Baker	34	33	722	21.2	44	132	0.333	34	103	0.330	12	22	0.545	19	58	77	2.3	47	1.4	61	0	24	29	2	134	3.9
Javonte Douglas	25	1	255	10.2	33	74	0.446	2	7	0.286	21	38	0.553	18	48	66	2.6	19	0.8	36	1	17	5	5	89	3.6
Denzell Taylor	35	9	847	24.2	44	80	0.550	0	0	0.000	15	34	0.441	125	84	209	6.0	46	1.3	97	0	44	37	23	103	2.9
Keenan Palmore	35	0	385	11.0	36	77	0.468	0	4	0.000	18	31	0.581	9	43	52	1.5	35	1.0	57	1	34	13	0	90	2.6
Nik Biberaj	28	0	237	8.5	21	61	0.344	7	20	0.350	9	14	0.643	20	28	48	1.7	11	0.4	33	0	6	1	4	58	2.1
Deion Clark	20	0	70	3.5	5	15	0.333	0	4	0.000	5	7	0.714	5	6	11	0.6	1	0.1	3	0	2	2	0	15	0.8
Martin Shaw	11	0	17	1.5	1	9	0.111	0	0	0.000	1	2	0.500	0	0	0	0.0	1	0.1	0	0	1	0	1	3	0.3
Joe Ebondo	15	1	58	3.9	2	3	0.667	0	0	0.000	0	1	0.000	2	8	10	0.7	0	0.0	9	0	0	2	1	4	0.3
TEAM	35													48	50	98	2.8					16				
Season Total	35		7050		836	1935	0.432	207	636	0.325	394	592	0.666	438	829	1267	36.2	472	13.5	618	4	377	221	115	2273	64.9
Opponents	35		7050		672	1678	0.400	204	654	0.312	451	685	0.658	305	779	1084	31.0	338	9.7	591	15	451	165	96	1999	57.1

== Rankings ==
Ranking movement Legend: ██ Improvement in ranking. ██ Decrease in ranking. ██ Not ranked the previous week. RV=Others receiving votes. ( ) = First place votes.
Poll	Pre	Wk 2	Wk 3	Wk 4	Wk 5	Wk 6	Wk 7	Wk 8	Wk 9	Wk 10	Wk 11	Wk 12	Wk 13	Wk 14	Wk 15	Wk 16	Wk 17	Wk 18	Wk 19	Final
AP	NR	NR	NR	RV	RV	RV	RV	RV	25	RV	RV	NR	NR	RV	NR	NR	NR	NR	NR	N/A
Coaches	NR	NR	NR	NR	NR	NR	RV	RV	RV	RV	RV	NR	NR	NR	NR	NR	NR	NR	NR	NR

== Awards ==
=== In-season ===
	CUSA Player of the Week		
Date	Name	Class	Position
February 23, 2015	Trey Freeman	Jr.	PG
March 2, 2015	Trey Freeman	Jr.	PG

=== Postseason ===
- Jeff Jones
  - Barefoot Coach of the Year
- Trey Freeman
  - All-Conference USA First Team
  - Conference USA Newcomer of the Year
  - NABC All-District 11 First Team
  - Conference USA All-Academic Team

== See also ==
- 2014–15 Old Dominion Lady Monarchs basketball team
