= Michael Grant (basketball) =

American basketball player and coach

Current position
- Title: Associate Athletic Director for Championship Resources
- Team: North Alabama
- Conference: Atlantic Sun Conference

Biographical details
- Born: March 13, 1963 (age 63); Cleveland, Ohio, U.S.

Playing career
- 1981–1984: Malone

Coaching career (HC unless noted)
- 1984–1986: Malone (asst.)
- 1986–1988: Michigan (grad. asst.)
- 1988–1989: Allegheny (asst.)
- 1989–1994: Kentucky State (asst.)
- 1994–1996: Cleveland State (asst.)
- 1996–2003: Central State
- 2003–2005: Southern
- 2005–2006: Toledo (asst.)
- 2008–2014: Stillman
- 2014–2017: Coppin State
- 2021–2022: Allen

Administrative career (AD unless noted)
- 2022–2023: Talladega (VP and AD)
- 2025–present: North Alabama (Assoc. AD)

Head coaching record
- Overall: 51–114 (.309) (NCAA D-I)

Michael Grant (born March 13, 1963) is an American college sports administrator and former college basketball coach. He most recently served as the head coach for Allen University. He was also a graduate assistant at the University of Michigan where he helped coach his younger brother, Gary Grant.

Grant was fired as Coppin State coach on March 20, 2017, after compiling a three-year record of 25–69.

== Division I head coaching record ==
Record table
Season	Team	Overall	Conference	Standing	Postseason
Southern Jaguars (SWAC) (2003–2005)
2003–04	Southern	12–16	9–9	8th	
2004–05	Southern	14–15	10–8	6th	
Southern:		26–45 (.366)	19–17 (.528)		
Coppin State Eagles (MEAC) (2014–2017)
2014–15	Coppin State	8–23	6–10	T–9th	
2015–16	Coppin State	9–22	6–10	T–9th	
2016–17	Coppin State	8–24	7–9	T–7th	
Coppin State:		25–69 (.266)	19–29 (.396)		
Total:		51–114 (.309)			
National champion Postseason invitational champion Conference regular season champion Conference regular season and conference tournament champion Division regular season champion Division regular season and conference tournament champion Conference tournament champion
