= McDougald–McLendon Arena =

Arean in North Carolina

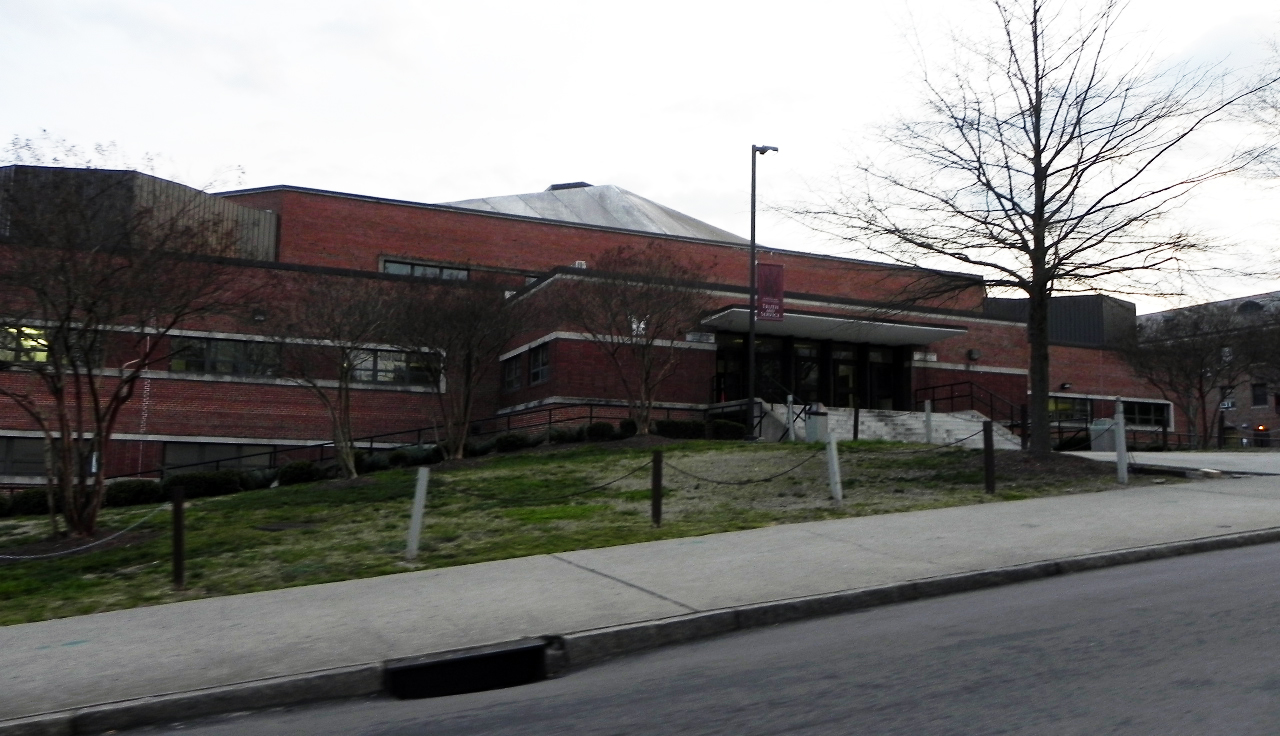
- Interactive map of McDougald–McLendon Arena
- Location: 1801 Fayetteville Street; Durham, North Carolina 27707
- Coordinates: 35.975884°N 78.897745°W
- Owner: North Carolina Central University
- Operator: North Carolina Central University
- Capacity: 3,500
- Surface: Hardwood

Construction
- Opened: 1950

Tenant
- North Carolina Central Eagles (NCAA)

McDougald–McLendon Arena is a 3,500-seat multi-purpose arena in Durham, North Carolina. Opened in 1950, it is home to the North Carolina Central University Eagles basketball and volleyball teams.

The arena is named for NCCU alumnus and civic leader Richard L. McDougald and former coach John McLendon. McDougald was instrumental in helping blacks achieve home ownership in Durham in the mid-20th century, while McLendon helped organize "The Secret Game" between then named North Carolina College and Duke University Medical School in 1944, which was the first fully integrated college basketball game.

== Gallery ==
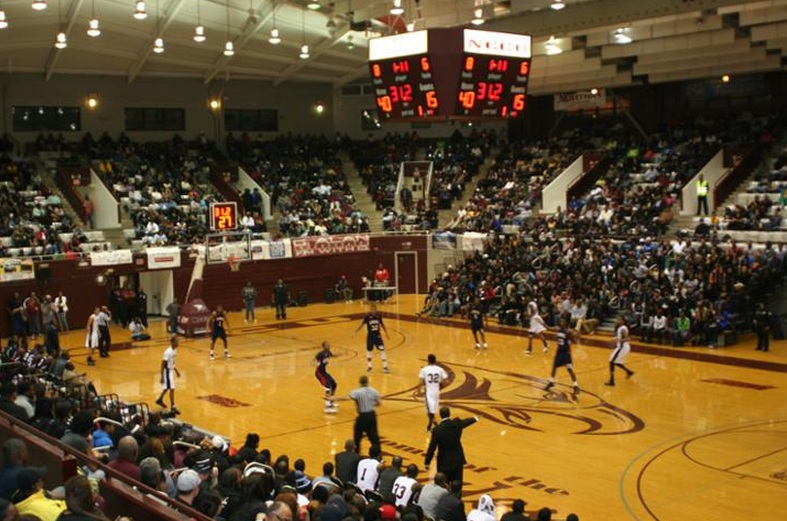
McDougald–McLendon Arena Court

== See also ==
- List of NCAA Division I basketball arenas
