= Physical Education Complex =

Arena in Baltimore, Maryland, USA

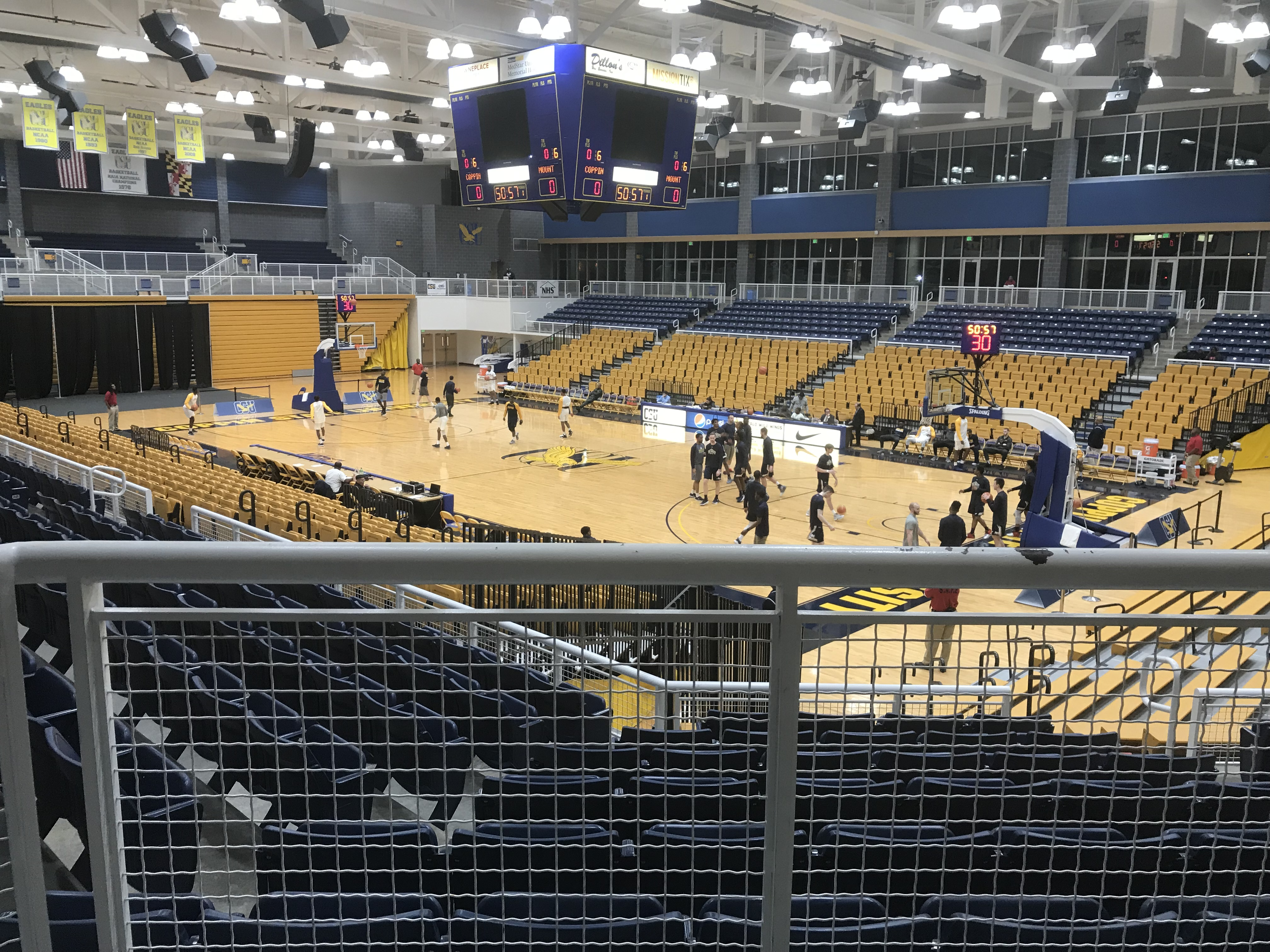
- Interactive map of Physical Education Complex
- Location: 2500 W. North Avenue; Baltimore, Maryland 21216
- Coordinates: 39°18′55.63″N 76°39′26.57″W
- Owner: Coppin State University
- Operator: Coppin State University
- Capacity: 4,100
- Surface: Hardwood

Construction
- Groundbreaking: October 3, 2007
- Opened: December 5, 2009
- Cost: $111,714,000 ($168 million in 2025 dollars)
- Architects: Conrad, Stephenson & Donkervoet, Inc. Sasaki Associates
- Structural engineers: Hope Furrer Associates, Inc.
- Services engineers: James Posey Associates, Inc.
- General contractor: Gilbane/Banks

Tenant
- Coppin State University basketball

Physical Education Complex is a 4,100-seat multi-purpose arena in Baltimore, Maryland. It was built in 2009 and became home to the Coppin State University men's basketball team in the 2009–2010 season. The women's basketball team and women's volleyball team also play at the facility. The arena replaced the Coppin Center.

== See also ==
- List of NCAA Division I basketball arenas
