= 2014–15 Conference USA men's basketball season =

- League: NCAA Division I
- Sport: Basketball
- Teams: 14
- TV partner(s): CBS Sports Network, Fox Sports, American Sports Network

2014–15 NCAA Division I men's basketball season
- Regular season champions: Louisiana Tech
- Runners-up: UTEP; Old Dominion
- Season MVP: Speedy Smith

Tournament
- Champions: UAB
- Runners-up: Middle Tennessee
- Finals MVP: Robert Brown, UAB

Basketball seasons
- ← 2013–14 2015–16 →

2014–15 Conference USA men's basketball standings
	Conf.				Overall
Team	W		L	PCT	W		L	PCT
Louisiana Tech	15	–	3	.833	27	–	9	.750
Old Dominion	13	–	5	.722	27	–	8	.771
UTEP	13	–	5	.722	22	–	11	.667
WKU	12	–	6	.667	20	–	12	.625
UAB †	12	–	6	.667	20	–	16	.556
Middle Tennessee	9	–	9	.500	19	–	17	.528
FIU	8	–	10	.444	16	–	17	.485
UTSA	8	–	10	.444	14	–	16	.467
North Texas	8	–	10	.444	14	–	17	.452
Rice	8	–	10	.444	12	–	20	.375
Charlotte	7	–	11	.389	14	–	18	.438
Marshall	7	–	11	.389	11	–	21	.344
Southern Miss*	4	–	14	.222	9	–	20	.310
Florida Atlantic	2	–	16	.111	9	–	20	.310
† 2015 C-USA Tournament winner *Ineligible for postseason play due to self-imposed postseason ban

The 2014–15 Conference USA men's basketball season began with practices in October 2014, followed by the start of the 2014–15 NCAA Division I men's basketball season in November.

== Preseason ==
=== Preseason Polls ===
	C-USA Coaches
1.	Louisiana Tech
2.	UTEP
3.	Charlotte
4.	Old Dominion

=== Preseason All-Conference Team ===
C-USA Coaches
Pierriá Henry, G Charlotte
Raheem Appleby, G Louisiana Tech
Alex Hamilton, G Louisiana Tech
Speedy Smith, G Louisiana Tech
Aaron Bacote, G Old Dominion
C.J. Washington, F UAB
Vince Hunter, F UTEP
Julian Washburn, F/G UTEP
George Fant, F WKU
T.J. Price, G WKU

== Rankings ==
Legend
	Improvement in ranking
	Drop in ranking
	Not ranked previous week
RV	Received votes but were not ranked in Top 25 of poll

		Pre/ Wk 1	Wk 2	Wk 3	Wk 4	Wk 5	Wk 6	Wk 7	Wk 8	Wk 9	Wk 10	Wk 11	Wk 12	Wk 13	Wk 14	Wk 15	Wk 16	Wk 17	Wk 18	Wk 19	Final
Charlotte	AP																				
Charlotte	C																				
FIU	AP																				
FIU	C																				
Florida Atlantic	AP																				
Florida Atlantic	C																				
Louisiana Tech	AP	RV	RV									RV		RV							
Louisiana Tech	C	RV	RV	RV		RV															
Marshall	AP																				
Marshall	C																				
Middle Tennessee	AP																				
Middle Tennessee	C																				
North Texas	AP																				
North Texas	C																				
Old Dominion	AP				RV	RV	RV	RV	RV	25	RV	RV			RV						
Old Dominion	C					RV	RV	RV	RV	RV	RV	RV									
Rice	AP																				
Rice	C																				
Southern Miss	AP																				
Southern Miss	C																				
UAB	AP																				
UAB	C																				
UTEP	AP	RV	RV	RV																	
UTEP	C	RV	RV	RV	RV																
UTSA	AP																				
UTSA	C																				
WKU	AP																				
WKU	C																				

== Conference schedules ==
=== Conference matrix ===
This table summarizes the head-to-head results between teams in conference play.

	Charlotte	FIU	FAU	LaTech	Marshall	MTSU	UNT	ODU	Rice	USM	UAB	UTEP	UTSA	WKU
vs. Charlotte	–	–	–	–	–	–	–	–	–	–	–	–	–	–
vs. FIU	0–1	–	–	–	–	–	–	–	–	–	–	–	–	–
vs. Florida Atlantic	1–0	–	–	–	–	–	–	–	–	–	–	–	–	–
vs. Louisiana Tech	0–1	–	–	–	–	–	–	–	–	–	–	–	–	–
vs. Marshall	2–0	–	–	–	–	–	–	–	–	–	–	–	–	–
vs. Middle Tennessee	0–1	–	–	–	–	–	–	–	–	–	–	–	–	–
vs. North Texas	1–1	–	–	–	–	–	–	–	–	–	–	–	–	–
vs. Old Dominion	0–2	–	–	–	–	–	–	–	–	–	–	–	–	–
vs. Rice	1–1	–	–	–	–	–	–	–	–	–	–	–	–	–
vs. Southern Miss	1–0	–	–	–	–	–	–	–	–	–	–	–	–	–
vs. UAB	0–1	–	–	–	–	–	–	–	–	–	–	–	–	–
vs. UTEP	0–1	–	–	–	–	–	–	–	–	–	–	–	–	–
vs. UTSA	1–0	–	–	–	–	–	–	–	–	–	–	–	–	–
vs. WKU	0–2	–	–	–	–	–	–	–	–	–	–	–	–	–
Total	7–11	–	–	–	–	–	–	–	–	–	–	–	–	–

== Player of the week ==
Players of the week

Throughout the conference regular season, the C-USA offices named one or two players of the week and one or two freshmen of the week each Monday.

Week	Player of the week	Freshman of the week
November 17, 2014	Vince Hunter, UTEP	Jeremy Combs, North Texas
November 24, 2014	Mike Thorne Jr., Charlotte	Bishop Mency, Rice
December 1, 2014	Vince Hunter (2), UTEP	Torin Dorn, Charlotte
December 8, 2014	Alex Hamilton, Louisiana Tech	Justin Massey, Florida Atlantic
December 15, 2014	Alex Hamilton (2), Louisiana Tech	Justin Johnson, WKU
December 15, 2014	T. J. Price, WKU	Edward Simpson Jr., Middle Tennessee
December 22, 2014	Vince Hunter (3), UTEP	Keyshawn Woods, Charlotte
December 29, 2014	Vince Hunter (4), UTEP	Bishop Mency (2), Rice
January 5, 2015	Chip Armelin, Southern Miss	Xavian Stapleton, Louisiana Tech
January 12, 2015	Raheem Appleby, Louisiana Tech	Torin Dorn (2), Charlotte
January 12, 2015	George Fant, WKU	Torin Dorn (2), Charlotte
January 19, 2015	Alex Hamilton (3), Louisiana Tech	Chris Cokley, UAB
January 26, 2015	Jeromie Hill, UTSA	Nick Norton, UAB
February 2, 2015	Speedy Smith, Louisiana Tech	Torin Dorn (3), Charlotte
February 2, 2015	Speedy Smith, Louisiana Tech	Jeremy Combs (2), North Texas
February 9, 2015	Kaj-Björn Sherman, UTSA	Nick Norton (2), UAB
February 16, 2015	Seth Gearhart, Rice	William Lee, UAB
February 16, 2015	Keon Lewis, UTSA	William Lee, UAB
February 23, 2015	Trey Freeman, Old Dominion	Giddy Potts, Middle Tennessee
March 2, 2015	Trey Freeman (2), Old Dominion	William Lee (2), UAB
March 9, 2015	Adrian Diaz, FIU	Keyshawn Woods (2), Charlotte

== Honors and awards ==
=== All-Conference USA Awards and Teams ===
Honor	Recipient
Player of the Year	Speedy Smith, Louisiana Tech
Coach of the Year	Michael White, Louisiana Tech
Freshman of the Year	Torin Dorn, Charlotte
Defensive Player of the Year	Julian Washburn, UTEP
Newcomer of the Year	Trey Freeman, Old Dominion
Sixth Man of the Year	Chris Cokley, UAB
All-Conference USA First Team	Speedy Smith, Louisiana Tech
All-Conference USA First Team	Trey Freeman, Old Dominion
All-Conference USA First Team	Vince Hunter, UTEP
All-Conference USA First Team	Jeromie Hill, UTSA
All-Conference USA First Team	T. J. Price, WKU
All-Conference USA Second Team	Dennis Mavin, FIU
All-Conference USA Second Team	Raheem Appleby, Louisiana Tech
All-Conference USA Second Team	Alex Hamilton, Louisiana Tech
All-Conference USA Second Team	Seth Gearhart, Rice
All-Conference USA Second Team	George Fant, WKU
All-Conference USA Third Team	Pierriá Henry, Charlotte
All-Conference USA Third Team	Ryan Taylor, Marshall
All-Conference USA Third Team	Jordan Williams, North Texas
All-Conference USA Third Team	Chip Armelin, Southern Miss
All-Conference USA Third Team	Robert Brown, UAB
All-Freshman Team	Torin Dorn, Charlotte
All-Freshman Team	Giddy Potts, Middle Tennessee
All-Freshman Team	Jeremy Combs, North Texas
All-Freshman Team	Nick Norton, UAB
All-Freshman Team	William Lee, UAB
All-Defensive Team	Pierriá Henry, Charlotte
All-Defensive Team	Adrian Diaz, FIU
All-Defensive Team	Michale Kyser, Louisiana Tech
All-Defensive Team	Speedy Smith, Louisiana Tech
All-Defensive Team	Julian Washburn, UTEP
All-Academic Team	Kris Gulley, FIU
All-Academic Team	Austin Loop, Marshall
All-Academic Team	Trey Freeman, Old Dominion
All-Academic Team	Seth Gearhart, Rice
All-Academic Team	Marcus Jackson, Rice
All-Academic Team	Jeromie Hill, UTSA

== Postseason ==
=== Conference USA Tournament ===
- March 11–14, Conference USA Basketball Tournament, Legacy Arena, Birmingham

First Round; Wednesday, March 11; ASN
8	North Texas	54
9	Rice	82
5	WKU	59
12	Marshall	45
7	UTSA	54
10	FIU	57
6	Middle Tennessee	63
11	Charlotte	60

Quarterfinals; Thursday, March 12; ASN
1	Louisiana Tech	70
9	Rice	64
4	UAB	53
5	WKU	52
2	UTEP	83
10	FIU	71
3	Old Dominion	52
6	Middle Tennessee	59

Semifinals; Friday, March 13; CBSSN
1	Louisiana Tech	62
4	UAB	72*
2	UTEP	50
6	Middle Tennessee	53

Championship Game; Saturday, March 14; FS1
4	UAB	73
6	Middle Tennessee	60

=== NCAA tournament ===
Seed	Region	School	First Four	Round of 64	Round of 32	Sweet 16	Elite Eight	Final Four	Championship
14	South	UAB		W, 60–59 vs. #3 Iowa State – (Louisville)	L, 75–92 vs. #11 UCLA – (Louisville)				
		W–L (%):	0–0 –	1–0 1.000	0–1 .000	0–0 –	0–0 –	0–0 –	0–0 –Total: 1–1 .500

=== National Invitation Tournament ===
Seed	Bracket	School	First round	Second round	Quarterfinals	Semifinals	Finals
1	Old Dominion	Old Dominion	W, 65–56 vs. #8 Charleston Southern	W, 50–49 vs. #4 Illinois State	W, 72–69 vs. #3 Murray State	W, 60–67 vs. #2 Stanford – (New York City)	
3	Temple	Louisiana Tech	W, 89–79 vs. #6 Central Michigan	W, 84–72 vs. #2 Texas A&M	L, 59–77 vs. #1 Temple		
6	Old Dominion	UTEP	L, 66–81 vs. #3 Murray State				
		W–L (%):	2–1 .667	2–0 1.000	1–1 .500	0–1 .000	0–0 – Total: 5–3 .625

=== CollegeInsider.com Postseason Tournament ===
School	First round	Second round	Quarterfinals	Semifinals	Finals
Middle Tennessee	L, 56–68 vs. Kent State				
W–L (%):	0–1 .000	0–0 –	0–0 –	0–0 –	0–0 – Total: 0–1 .000
