= 2014–15 Western Kentucky Hilltoppers basketball team =

American college basketball season

2014–15 Western Kentucky Hilltoppers basketball
- Conference: Conference USA
- Record: 20–12 (12–6 C-USA)
- Head coach: Ray Harper (3rd season)
- Assistant coaches: Lawrence Brenneman; David Boyden; Shawn Forrest
- Home arena: E. A. Diddle Arena

2014–15 Conference USA men's basketball standings
	Conf.				Overall
Team	W		L	PCT	W		L	PCT
Louisiana Tech	15	–	3	.833	27	–	9	.750
Old Dominion	13	–	5	.722	27	–	8	.771
UTEP	13	–	5	.722	22	–	11	.667
WKU	12	–	6	.667	20	–	12	.625
UAB †	12	–	6	.667	20	–	16	.556
Middle Tennessee	9	–	9	.500	19	–	17	.528
FIU	8	–	10	.444	16	–	17	.485
UTSA	8	–	10	.444	14	–	16	.467
North Texas	8	–	10	.444	14	–	17	.452
Rice	8	–	10	.444	12	–	20	.375
Charlotte	7	–	11	.389	14	–	18	.438
Marshall	7	–	11	.389	11	–	21	.344
Southern Miss*	4	–	14	.222	9	–	20	.310
Florida Atlantic	2	–	16	.111	9	–	20	.310
† 2015 C-USA Tournament winner *Ineligible for postseason play due to self-imposed postseason ban

The 2014–15 Western Kentucky Hilltoppers men's basketball team represented Western Kentucky University during the 2014–15 NCAA Division I men's basketball season. The Hilltoppers were led by head coach Ray Harper in his third season. They played their home games at E. A. Diddle Arena and were first year members of Conference USA. They finished the season 20–12, 12–6 in C-USA play to finish in a tie for fourth place. They advanced to the quarterfinals of the C-USA tournament where they lost to UAB. Despite having 20 wins they didn't play in a postseason tournament.

== Previous season ==
The Hilltoppers finished the season 20–12, 12–6 in Sun Belt play to finish in second place. They lost in the semifinals of the Sun Belt Conference tournament where they lost to Louisiana–Lafayette. Despite having 20 wins, they did not play in a postseason tournament.

== Departures ==
Name	Number	Pos.	Height	Weight	Year	Hometown	Notes
Payton Hulsey	0	G	6'5"	206	Freshman	Memphis, TN	Transferred to Eastern Florida State
Caden Dickerson	10	F	6'5"	205	RS Senior	Argyle, TX	Graduated
Aaron Adeoye	11	F	6'7"	237	Junior	Marion, IL	Transferred to Southeast Missouri State
Brandon Harris	12	G	6'1"	173	Senior	Oklahoma City, OK	Graduated
O'Karo Akamune	15	F	6'7"	210	Senior	Miami, FL	Graduated
Daouda Soumaoro	33	F	6'9"	236	RS Sophomore	Bamako, Mali	Transferred to Mobile

=== Incoming transfers ===
Name	Number	Pos.	Height	Weight	Year	Hometown	Previous School
Ayinde Sprewell	0	G	6'3"	195	Junior	Orlando, FL	Junior college transfer from Daytona State College.

== Class of 2014 recruits ==
College recruiting information
Name	Hometown	School	Height	Weight	Commit date
Jordan Green; SF	Lexington, KY	Henry Clay High School	6 ft 5 in (1.96 m)	190 lb (86 kg)	Apr 14, 2014
Jordan Green; SF	Recruit ratings: Scout: Rivals: (70)				
Justin Johnson; PF	Hazard, KY	Perry County Central High School	6 ft 7 in (2.01 m)	235 lb (107 kg)	Oct 14, 2013
Justin Johnson; PF	Recruit ratings: Scout: Rivals: (68)				
Avery Patterson; PG	Marietta, GA	Joseph Wheeler High School	6 ft 1 in (1.85 m)	170 lb (77 kg)	Nov 11, 2013
Avery Patterson; PG	Recruit ratings: Scout: Rivals: (NR)				
Derrick Clayton; PF	Castro Valley, CA	Elev8 Basketball Academy	6 ft 5 in (1.96 m)	180 lb (82 kg)	Nov 11, 2013
Derrick Clayton; PF	Recruit ratings: Scout: Rivals: (NR)				
Overall recruit ranking:
Note: In many cases, Scout, Rivals, 247Sports, On3, and ESPN may conflict in their listings of height and weight.; In these cases, the average was taken. ESPN grades are on a 100-point scale.; Sources: "2014 Team Ranking". Rivals.

== Class of 2015 recruits ==
College recruiting information
Name	Hometown	School	Height	Weight	Commit date
Chris McNeal; PG	Memphis, TN	South Side High School	5 ft 11 in (1.80 m)	165 lb (75 kg)	Jul 7, 2014
Chris McNeal; PG	Recruit ratings: Scout: Rivals: (NR)				
Overall recruit ranking:
Note: In many cases, Scout, Rivals, 247Sports, On3, and ESPN may conflict in their listings of height and weight.; In these cases, the average was taken. ESPN grades are on a 100-point scale.; Sources: "2015 Team Ranking". Rivals.

== Roster ==
2014–15 Western Kentucky Hilltoppers men's basketball team
Players
Coaches

Pos.	#	Name	Height	Weight	Year	Hometown
G	0	Ayinde Sprewell	6 ft 3 in (1.91 m)	188 lb (85 kg)	Jr	Orlando, Florida
G	1	Kevin Kaspar	6 ft 0 in (1.83 m)	173 lb (78 kg)	Sr	Istanbul, Turkey
G	2	Derrick Clayton	6 ft 6 in (1.98 m)	184 lb (83 kg)	Fr	Castro Valley, California
G	3	Trency Jackson	6 ft 2 in (1.88 m)	188 lb (85 kg)	RS Sr	Jackson, Mississippi
G	5	Brandon Price	5 ft 9 in (1.75 m)	151 lb (68 kg)	So	Radcliff, Kentucky
F	10	Jordan Green	6 ft 7 in (2.01 m)	193 lb (88 kg)	Fr	Lexington, Kentucky
F	14	Benjamin Lawson	7 ft 1 in (2.16 m)	215 lb (98 kg)	So	Hitchin, England
G	15	Avery Patterson	6 ft 0 in (1.83 m)	190 lb (86 kg)	Fr	Decatur, Georgia
C	20	Aleksej Rostov	6 ft 10 in (2.08 m)	225 lb (102 kg)	Jr	Riga, Latvia
F	21	Nigel Snipes	6 ft 6 in (1.98 m)	215 lb (98 kg)	RS Jr	Marietta, Georgia
F	23	Justin Johnson	6 ft 7 in (2.01 m)	239 lb (108 kg)	Fr	Hazard, Kentucky
F	33	Rob Marberry (W)	6 ft 8 in (2.03 m)	230 lb (104 kg)	Fr	Nashville, Tennessee
F	44	George Fant	6 ft 6 in (1.98 m)	250 lb (113 kg)	Sr	Bowling Green, Kentucky
G	51	Chris Harrison-Docks	6 ft 0 in (1.83 m)	168 lb (76 kg)	RS So	Okemos, Michigan
G	52	T. J. Price	6 ft 4 in (1.93 m)	223 lb (101 kg)	Sr	Slidell, Louisiana

Head coach

- Ray Harper (Kentucky Wesleyan)

Assistant coach(es)

- Lawrence Brenneman (Geneva)
- David Boyden (Western Kentucky)
- Shawn Forrest (Arkansas–Pine Bluff)

Legend

- (C) Team captain
- (S) Suspended
- (I) Ineligible
- (W) Walk-on
- Injured
- Current redshirt

Roster

== Schedule ==
Date time, TV	Rank^{#}	Opponent^{#}	Result	Record	Site (attendance) city, state
Exhibition
11/10/2014; 7:00 pm		Pikeville	W 105–84	–	E. A. Diddle Arena (3,487); Bowling Green, KY
Regular season
11/15/2014*; 4:00 pm		Austin Peay	W 77–70	1–0	E. A. Diddle Arena (4,572); Bowling Green, KY
11/18/2014*; 7:00 pm, ESPN3		at Minnesota; NIT Season Tip-Off	L 54–76	1–1	Williams Arena (10,763); Minneapolis, MN
11/22/2014*; 7:00 pm		Belmont	L 63–64	1–2	E. A. Diddle Arena (5,194); Bowling Green, KY
11/25/2014*; 6:00 pm		at Stony Brook; NIT Season Tip-Off	L 61–71	1–3	Island Federal Credit Union Arena (2,252); Stony Brook, NY
11/27/2014*; 6:00 pm, ESPNU		vs. Saint Joseph's; NIT Season Tip-Off	W 62–59	2–3	Madison Square Garden (1,266); New York City, NY
12/03/2014*; 7:00 pm, ASN		Bowling Green	W 62–52	3–3	E. A. Diddle Arena (3,852); Bowling Green, KY
12/06/2014*; 5:30 pm, ASN		at Murray State	L 81–93	3–4	CFSB Center (5,312); Murray, KY
12/13/2014*; 3:30 pm		at Ole Miss	W 81–74	4–4	Tad Smith Coliseum (6,692); Oxford, MS
12/17/2014*; 7:00 pm		Chicago State	W 75–60	5–4	E. A. Diddle Arena (2,876); Bowling Green, KY
12/20/2014*; 11:00 am, FS1		No. 4 Louisville	L 67–76 ^{Vacated}	5–5	E. A. Diddle Arena (7,598); Bowling Green, KY
12/27/2014*; 7:00 pm		Brescia	W 89–42	6–5	E. A. Diddle Arena (2,903); Bowling Green, KY
12/29/2014*; 7:00 pm		Alice Lloyd	W 104–62	7–5	E. A. Diddle Arena (2,722); Bowling Green, KY
01/04/2015; 2:00 pm		Marshall	W 81–62	8–5 (1–0)	E. A. Diddle Arena (3,597); Bowling Green, KY
01/08/2015; 7:00 pm		Charlotte	W 74–66	9–5 (2–0)	E. A. Diddle Arena (3,606); Bowling Green, KY
01/10/2015; 4:30 pm, ASN		No. 25 Old Dominion	W 72–65	10–5 (3–0)	E. A. Diddle Arena (5,123); Bowling Green, KY
01/15/2015; 6:00 pm		at Florida Atlantic	W 88–85 ^{OT}	11–5 (4–0)	FAU Arena (1,491); Boca Raton, FL
01/17/2015; 5:00 pm		at FIU	W 65–58	12–5 (5–0)	FIU Arena (1,370); Miami, FL
01/22/2015; 8:00 pm, FSN		UTEP	W 71–66 ^{OT}	13–5 (6–0)	E. A. Diddle Arena (6,414); Bowling Green, KY
01/24/2015; 2:00 pm		UTSA	W 83–74	14–5 (7–0)	E. A. Diddle Arena (5,839); Bowling Green, KY
01/29/2015; 6:00 pm, CBSSN		at Louisiana Tech	L 56–69	14–6 (7–1)	Thomas Assembly Center (4,029); Ruston, LA
01/31/2015; 7:00 pm		at Southern Miss	W 73–62	15–6 (8–1)	Reed Green Coliseum (3,608); Hattiesburg, MS
02/05/2015; 7:00 pm		North Texas	W 65–59	16–6 (9–1)	E. A. Diddle Arena (3,862); Bowling Green, KY
02/07/2015; 7:00 pm		Rice	L 68–72	16–7 (9–2)	E. A. Diddle Arena (5,071); Bowling Green, KY
02/14/2015; 4:30 pm, ASN		at Marshall	L 82–87	16–8 (9–3)	Cam Henderson Center (6,135); Huntington, WV
02/19/2015; 7:00 pm		at UAB	L 66–71	16–9 (9–4)	Bartow Arena (3,892); Birmingham, AL
02/22/2015; 12:00 pm, FSN		at Middle Tennessee	L 66–68	16–10 (9–5)	Murphy Center (5,227); Murfreesboro, TN
02/26/2015; 7:00 pm		Florida Atlantic	W 71–68	17–10 (10–5)	E. A. Diddle Arena (3,645); Bowling Green, KY
02/28/2015; 7:00 pm		FIU	W 77–61	18–10 (11–5)	E. A. Diddle Arena (7,119); Bowling Green, KY
03/05/2015; 6:00 pm		at Charlotte	W 88–84 ^{OT}	19–10 (12–5)	Dale F. Halton Arena (3,526); Charlotte, NC
03/07/2015; 4:30 pm, ASN		at Old Dominion	L 52–75	19–11 (12–6)	Ted Constant Convocation Center (8,472); Norfolk, VA
Conference USA Tournament
03/11/2015; 6:00 pm, ASN	(5)	vs. (12) Marshall; First round	W 59–45	20–11	Birmingham–Jefferson Convention Complex; Birmingham, AL
03/12/2015; 6:00 pm, ASN	(5)	vs. (4) UAB; Quarterfinal	L 52–53	20–12	Birmingham–Jefferson Convention Complex; Birmingham, AL
*Non-conference game. ^{#}Rankings from AP Poll. (#) Tournament seedings in parentheses. All times are in Central Time; Louisville’s win was later vacated by the NCAA due to recruiting violations by the Louisville basketball program..

== See also ==
2014–15 WKU Lady Toppers basketball team
