= 2014–15 Charlotte 49ers men's basketball team =

American college basketball season

2014–15 Charlotte 49ers men's basketball
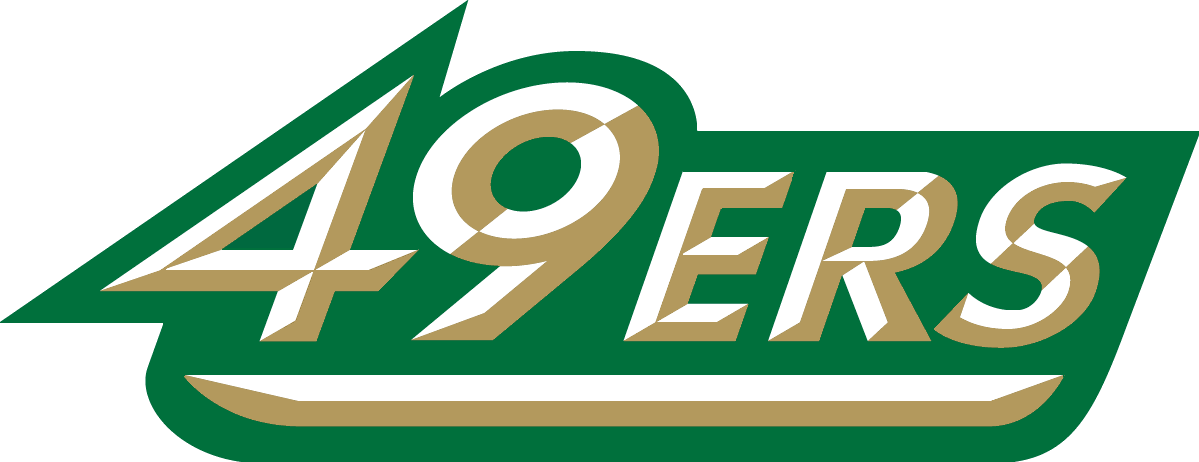
- Conference: Conference USA
- Record: 14–18 (7–11 C-USA)
- Head coach: Alan Major (5th season)
- Assistant coaches: Ryan Odom; Desmond Oliver; Orlando Vandross
- Home arena: Dale F. Halton Arena

2014–15 Conference USA men's basketball standings
	Conf.				Overall
Team	W		L	PCT	W		L	PCT
Louisiana Tech	15	–	3	.833	27	–	9	.750
Old Dominion	13	–	5	.722	27	–	8	.771
UTEP	13	–	5	.722	22	–	11	.667
WKU	12	–	6	.667	20	–	12	.625
UAB †	12	–	6	.667	20	–	16	.556
Middle Tennessee	9	–	9	.500	19	–	17	.528
FIU	8	–	10	.444	16	–	17	.485
UTSA	8	–	10	.444	14	–	16	.467
North Texas	8	–	10	.444	14	–	17	.452
Rice	8	–	10	.444	12	–	20	.375
Charlotte	7	–	11	.389	14	–	18	.438
Marshall	7	–	11	.389	11	–	21	.344
Southern Miss*	4	–	14	.222	9	–	20	.310
Florida Atlantic	2	–	16	.111	9	–	20	.310
† 2015 C-USA Tournament winner *Ineligible for postseason play due to self-imposed postseason ban

The 2014–15 Charlotte 49ers men's basketball team represented the University of North Carolina at Charlotte during the 2014–15 NCAA Division I men's basketball season. The 49ers, led by fifth head coach Alan Major, played their home games at the Dale F. Halton Arena and were members Conference USA. Major took an indefinite leave of absence January 6 for medical issues and was replaced by assistant coach Ryan Odom who finished the season as interim head coach. After the season ended, Major and the university agreed to mutually part ways. They finished the season 14–18, 7–11 in C-USA play to finish in a tie for eleventh place. They lost in the first round of the C-USA tournament to Middle Tennessee.

== Previous season ==
The 49ers finished the season 17–14, 7–9 in C-USA play to finish in a tie for eighth place. They advanced to the quarterfinals of the C-USA tournament where they lost to Louisiana Tech.

== Departures ==
Name	Number	Pos.	Height	Weight	Year	Hometown	Notes
Denzel Ingram	10	G	6'0"	171	Sophomore	Chapel Hill, NC	Transferred to UNC Wilmington
Ben Cherry	24	G	6'3"	180	Senior	Charlotte, NC	Graduated
Marcus Bryan	25	F	6'7"	224	Freshman	Raleigh, NC	Transferred to UNC Wilmington

== Incoming transfers ==
Name	Number	Pos.	Height	Weight	Year	Hometown	Previous
Benas Griciunas	31	C	7'0"	225	Sophomore	Šilutė, Lithuania	Transferred from Auburn. Under NCAA transfer rules, Griciunas will have to redshirt for the 2014–15 season. Will have three years of remaining eligibility.

== Class of 2014 recruits ==
College recruiting information
Name	Hometown	School	Height	Weight	Commit date
Torin Dorn; SG	Charlotte, NC	Vance High School	6 ft 3 in (1.91 m)	180 lb (82 kg)	Oct 8, 2013
Torin Dorn; SG	Recruit ratings: Scout: Rivals: (70)				
Keyshawn Woods; SG	Charlotte, NC	Northside Christian Academy	6 ft 5 in (1.96 m)	195 lb (88 kg)	Sep 26, 2013
Keyshawn Woods; SG	Recruit ratings: Scout: Rivals: (69)				
Overall recruit ranking:
Note: In many cases, Scout, Rivals, 247Sports, On3, and ESPN may conflict in their listings of height and weight.; In these cases, the average was taken. ESPN grades are on a 100-point scale.; Sources: "2014 Team Ranking". Rivals.

== Roster ==
2014–15 Charlotte 49ers men's basketball team
Players
Coaches

Pos.	#	Name	Height	Weight	Year	Hometown
G	1	Braxton Ogbueze	6 ft 0 in (1.83 m)	187 lb (85 kg)	RS So	Charlotte, NC
G	2	Torin Dorn	6 ft 4 in (1.93 m)	201 lb (91 kg)	Fr	Charlotte, NC
G	3	Shawn Lester	6 ft 4 in (1.93 m)	196 lb (89 kg)	Jr	Mooresville, NC
G	5	Keyshawn Woods	6 ft 3 in (1.91 m)	182 lb (83 kg)	Fr	Gastonia, NC
G	10	Gavin Wilson	6 ft 1 in (1.85 m)	210 lb (95 kg)	Jr	Raleigh, NC
G	11	Ivan Benkovic	6 ft 7 in (2.01 m)	207 lb (94 kg)	RS So	Zagreb, CRO
C	12	Mike Thorne Jr.	6 ft 11 in (2.11 m)	270 lb (122 kg)	RS Jr	Fayetteville, NC
G	14	Terrence Williams	6 ft 4 in (1.93 m)	221 lb (100 kg)	Sr	Charlotte, NC
G	15	Pierriá Henry	6 ft 4 in (1.93 m)	197 lb (89 kg)	Sr	Charleston, WV
F	20	Cameron Blakely	6 ft 9 in (2.06 m)	214 lb (97 kg)	So	Winder, GA
F	21	Willie Clayton	6 ft 8 in (2.03 m)	238 lb (108 kg)	Jr	Thomasville, GA
F	22	Bernard Sullivan	6 ft 8 in (2.03 m)	231 lb (105 kg)	RS Jr	Gastonia, NC
F	25	Reid Aube	6 ft 6 in (1.98 m)	220 lb (100 kg)	So	Concord, NC
G	30	Mitch Warner	6 ft 3 in (1.91 m)	193 lb (88 kg)	Jr	Charlotte, NC
C	31	Benas Griciunas (redshirt)	7 ft 0 in (2.13 m)	229 lb (104 kg)	So	Silute, LIT

Head coach

- Alan Major (Purdue)

Assistant coach(es)

- Ryan Odom (Hampden–Sydney)
- Desmond Oliver (Dominican (NY))
- Orlando Vandross (American International)

Legend

- (C) Team captain
- (S) Suspended
- (I) Ineligible
- (W) Walk-on
- Injured
- Current redshirt

Roster

== Season Notes ==
Head Coach Alan Major would take an indefinite leave of absence for medical reasons starting on January 6 following the game against Old Dominion. He would not return for the season. Assistant Head Coach Ryan Odom would lead the program for the remainder of the season.

True Freshman Torin Dorn would be named Conference USA Freshman of the Year as the 49ers' leading scorer, averaging 11.8 points per game. Senior Pierriá Henry was named to the C-USA All-Defensive Team for the second straight year, which also marked his third Conference All-Defensive Team selection overall.

== Schedule ==
Date time, TV	Rank^{#}	Opponent^{#}	Result	Record	Site (attendance) city, state
Exhibition
11/10/2014*; 7:00 pm		Newberry	W 112–86		Dale F. Halton Arena (4,099); Charlotte, NC
Regular season
11/16/2014*; 5:30 pm, WCCB/ASN		at Elon	W 73–60	1–0	Alumni Gym (1,528); Elon, NC
11/20/2014*; 5:00 pm, ESPNU		vs. Penn State; Charleston Classic Quarterfinals	W 106–97	2–0	TD Arena (2,517); Charleston, SC
11/21/2014*; 7:00 pm, ESPNU		vs. South Carolina; Charleston Classic Semifinals	W 65–63	3–0	TD Arena (2,430); Charleston, SC
11/23/2014*; 9:00 pm, ESPN2		vs. Miami (FL); Charleston Classic Championship	L 58–77	3–1	TD Arena (1,532); Charleston, SC
11/25/2014*; 9:00 pm, FSN		No. 17 Miami (FL)	L 74–77	3–2	Dale F. Halton Arena (7,163); Charlotte, NC
11/30/2014*; 3:00 pm, WCCB/ASN		at UNC Asheville	W 66–63 ^{OT}	4–2	Kimmel Arena (1,327); Asheville, NC
12/03/2014*; 7:00 pm		at Davidson	L 86–92	4–3	John M. Belk Arena (4,606); Davidson, NC
12/07/2014*; 2:30 pm, ESPN3		vs. George Washington; BB&T Classic	L 70–78	4–4	Verizon Center (8,756); Washington, D.C.
12/16/2014*; 8:00 pm, WCCB/ASN		College of Charleston	W 90–85 ^{OT}	5–4	Dale F. Halton Arena (3,527); Charlotte, NC
12/18/2014*; 8:00 pm, WCCB/ASN		Appalachian State	W 75–65	6–4	Dale F. Halton Arena (4,237); Charlotte, NC
12/20/2014*; 12:00 pm, FSN		at Georgetown	L 78–81	6–5	Verizon Center (7,858); Washington, D.C.
12/30/2014*; 7:00 pm, ESPN3		at Georgia Tech	L 66–67	6–6	Hank McCamish Pavilion (5,567); Atlanta, GA
01/04/2015; 1:00 pm, WCCB/ASN		Old Dominion	L 54–61	6–7 (0–1)	Dale F. Halton Arena (3,779); Charlotte, NC
01/08/2015; 8:00 pm		at WKU	L 66–74	6–8 (0–2)	E. A. Diddle Arena (3,606); Bowling Green, KY
01/10/2015; 7:00 pm		at Marshall	W 77–72	7–8 (1–2)	Cam Henderson Center (5,013); Huntington, WV
01/15/2015; 7:00 pm		North Texas	W 73–57	8–8 (2–2)	Dale F. Halton Arena (3,694); Charlotte, NC
01/17/2015; 7:00 pm		Rice	L 68–73 ^{OT}	8–9 (2–3)	Dale F. Halton Arena (4,318); Charlotte, NC
01/22/2015; 8:00 pm		at UAB	L 76–81 ^{OT}	8–10 (2–4)	Bartow Arena (3,029); Birmingham, AL
01/24/2015; 6:00 pm		at Middle Tennessee	L 69–72	8–11 (2–5)	Murphy Center (4,839); Murfreesboro, TN
01/29/2015; 7:00 pm		Florida Atlantic	W 86–61	9–11 (3–5)	Dale F. Halton Arena (3,724); Charlotte, NC
01/31/2015; 7:00 pm		FIU	L 70–78	9–12 (3–6)	Dale F. Halton Arena (4,021); Charlotte, NC
02/04/2015*; 7:00 pm		North Carolina A&T	W 77–61	10–12	Dale F. Halton Arena (3,918); Charlotte, NC
02/07/2015; 7:00 pm, COX		at Old Dominion	L 57–61	10–13 (3–7)	Ted Constant Convocation Center (7,678); Norfolk, VA
02/12/2015; 9:00 pm		at UTEP	L 68–73	10–14 (3–8)	Don Haskins Center (7,533); El Paso, TX
02/14/2015; 3:00 pm		at UTSA	W 89–81	11–14 (4–8)	Convocation Center (982); San Antonio, TX
02/19/2015; 7:00 pm, CBSSN		Louisiana Tech	L 82–83 ^{OT}	11–15 (4–9)	Dale F. Halton Arena (4,078); Charlotte, NC
02/21/2015; 5:30 pm, WCCB/ASN		Southern Miss	W 71–43	12–15 (5–9)	Dale F. Halton Arena (5,469); Charlotte, NC
02/26/2015; 8:00 pm		at North Texas	L 65–81	12–16 (5–10)	The Super Pit (4,122); Denton, TX
02/28/2015; 8:00 pm		at Rice	W 77-76	13–16 (6–10)	Tudor Fieldhouse (4653); Houston, TX
03/05/2015; 7:00 pm		WKU	L 84–88 ^{OT}	13–17 (6–11)	Dale F. Halton Arena (3,526); Charlotte, NC
03/07/2015; 7:00 pm		Marshall	W 86–73	14–17 (7–11)	Dale F. Halton Arena (5,434); Charlotte, NC
Conference USA tournament
03/11/2015; 3:30 pm, ASN		vs. Middle Tennessee; First round	L 60–63	14–18	Birmingham–Jefferson Convention Complex; Birmingham, AL
*Non-conference game. ^{#}Rankings from AP Poll/Coaches' Poll. (#) Tournament seedings in parentheses. All times are in Eastern Time.
