= 2014–15 North Texas Mean Green men's basketball team =

American college basketball season

2014–15 North Texas Mean Green men's basketball
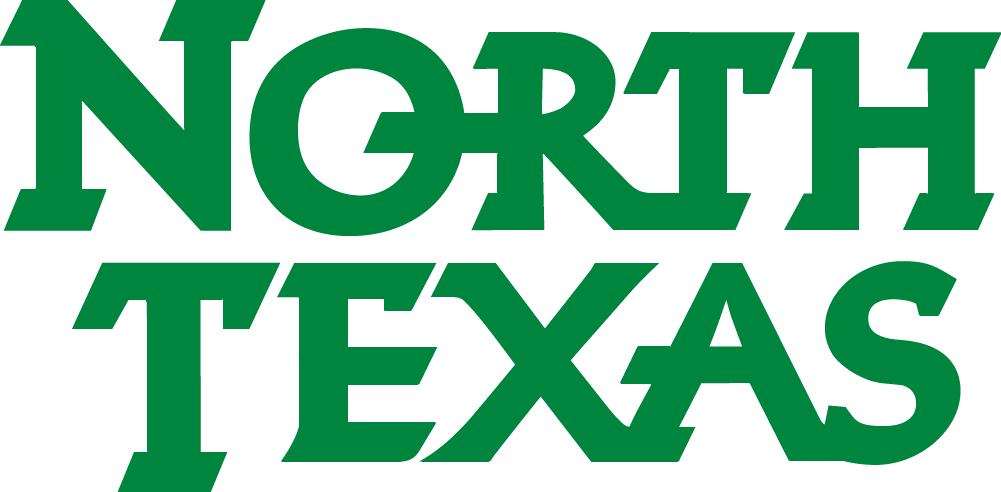
- Conference: Conference USA
- Record: 14–17 (8–10 C-USA)
- Head coach: Tony Benford (3rd season)
- Assistant coaches: Rob Evans; David Anwar; Scott Monarch
- Home arena: The Super Pit (Capacity: 10,040)

2014–15 Conference USA men's basketball standings
	Conf.				Overall
Team	W		L	PCT	W		L	PCT
Louisiana Tech	15	–	3	.833	27	–	9	.750
Old Dominion	13	–	5	.722	27	–	8	.771
UTEP	13	–	5	.722	22	–	11	.667
WKU	12	–	6	.667	20	–	12	.625
UAB †	12	–	6	.667	20	–	16	.556
Middle Tennessee	9	–	9	.500	19	–	17	.528
FIU	8	–	10	.444	16	–	17	.485
UTSA	8	–	10	.444	14	–	16	.467
North Texas	8	–	10	.444	14	–	17	.452
Rice	8	–	10	.444	12	–	20	.375
Charlotte	7	–	11	.389	14	–	18	.438
Marshall	7	–	11	.389	11	–	21	.344
Southern Miss*	4	–	14	.222	9	–	20	.310
Florida Atlantic	2	–	16	.111	9	–	20	.310
† 2015 C-USA Tournament winner *Ineligible for postseason play due to self-imposed postseason ban

The 2014–15 North Texas Mean Green men's basketball team represented the University of North Texas during the 2014–15 NCAA Division I men's basketball season. The Mean Green, led by third year head coach Tony Benford, played their home games at UNT Coliseum, nicknamed The Super Pit, and were members of Conference USA. They finished the season 14–17, 8–10 in C-USA play in a 4-way tie for seventh place. They lost in the first round of the C-USA tournament to Rice.

== Previous season ==
The Mean Green the season 16–16, 6–10 in C-USA play to finish 11th place. They advanced to the second round of the C-USA tournament where they lost to Tulane.

== Departures ==
Name	Number	Pos.	Height	Weight	Year	Hometown	Notes
Vertrail Vaughns	0	G	6'2"	184	RS Senior	Mesquite, TX	Graduated
Brandan Walton	2	G	6'2"	195	RS Senior	Compton, CA	Graduated
Alzee Williams	3	G	6'4"	175	RS Senior	Dallas, TX	Graduated
Chris Jones	5	G	6'2"	200	Junior	Garland, TX	Transferred to Angelo State
Austin Mitchell	10	G	6'1"	180	Sophomore	Plano, TX	Injured
Kelvin Gaines	24	F/C	6'10"	227	RS Junior	Ocala, FL	Graduated
Keith Coleman	44	F	6'10"	250	Junior	Philadelphia, PA	Transferred to LSU–Shreveport

=== Incoming transfers ===
Name	Number	Pos.	Height	Weight	Year	Hometown	Previous School
Carrington Ward	0	G	6'3"	175	Junior	Philadelphia, PA	Junior college transfer from San Jacinto College
DeAndre Harris	3	G	6'3"	180	Sophomore	Milwaukee, WI	Junior college transfer from Tyler Junior College
J-Mychal Reese	4	G	6'1"	187	Junior	Bryan, TX	Transferred from Texas A&M. Under NCAA transfer rules, Reese will have to redshirt for the 2014–15 season. Will have two years of remaining eligibility.
Muhammed Ahmed	20	F	6'7"	210	Junior	Bronx, NY	Junior college transfer from Gillette College

== Recruiting class of 2014 ==
College recruiting information
Name	Hometown	School	Height	Weight	Commit date
Jeremy Combs; SF	Dallas, TX	Carter High School	6 ft 7 in (2.01 m)	185 lb (84 kg)	Sep 23, 2013
Jeremy Combs; SF	Recruit ratings: Scout: Rivals: (NR)				
Greg White-Pittman; SG	New Orleans, LA	Holy Cross High School	6 ft 3 in (1.91 m)	200 lb (91 kg)	May 10, 2014
Greg White-Pittman; SG	Recruit ratings: Scout: Rivals: (NR)				
Overall recruit ranking:
Note: In many cases, Scout, Rivals, 247Sports, On3, and ESPN may conflict in their listings of height and weight.; In these cases, the average was taken. ESPN grades are on a 100-point scale.; Sources: "2014 Team Ranking". Rivals.

=== Recruiting class of 2015 ===
College recruiting information
Name	Hometown	School	Height	Weight	Commit date
Ja'Michael Brown; PG	San Antonio, TX	Pro-Vision Academy	6 ft 1 in (1.85 m)	195 lb (88 kg)	Sep 13, 2014
Ja'Michael Brown; PG	Recruit ratings: Scout: Rivals: (NR)				
Overall recruit ranking:
Note: In many cases, Scout, Rivals, 247Sports, On3, and ESPN may conflict in their listings of height and weight.; In these cases, the average was taken. ESPN grades are on a 100-point scale.; Sources: "2015 Team Ranking". Rivals.

== Roster ==
2014–15 North Texas Mean Green men's basketball team
Players
Coaches

Pos.	#	Name	Height	Weight	Year	Previous school	Hometown
G	0	Carrington Ward	6 ft 2 in (1.88 m)	180 lb (82 kg)	Jr	San Jacinto College	Philadelphia, PA
G/F	1	Maurice Aniefiok	6 ft 5 in (1.96 m)	212 lb (96 kg)	RS Jr	Mississippi	Lagos, Nigeria
G	2	Greg White-Pittman	6 ft 2 in (1.88 m)	206 lb (93 kg)	Fr	Holy Cross HS	New Orleans, LA
G	3	DeAndre Harris	6 ft 3 in (1.91 m)	180 lb (82 kg)	RS So	Tyler JC	Milwaukee, WI
G	4	J-Mychal Reese (redshirt)	6 ft 1 in (1.85 m)	173 lb (78 kg)	Jr	Texas A&M	Bryan, TX
G	5	Todd Eaglin	5 ft 10 in (1.78 m)	170 lb (77 kg)	Jr	Tyler JC	The Woodlands, TX
G	10	Chris Campbell	6 ft 3 in (1.91 m)	185 lb (84 kg)	Jr	Jacksonville College	Houston, TX
F	11	Jeremy Combs	6 ft 7 in (2.01 m)	182 lb (83 kg)	Fr	Carter HS	Dallas, TX
F	20	Muhammed Ahmed	6 ft 7 in (2.01 m)	215 lb (98 kg)	Jr	Gillette College	Bronx, NY
G	21	T. J. Taylor	6 ft 3 in (1.91 m)	215 lb (98 kg)	RS Sr	Marquette	Denison, TX
F	22	Greg Wesley	6 ft 7 in (2.01 m)	190 lb (86 kg)	RS Fr	Seguin HS	Arlington, TX
G	23	Jordan Williams	6 ft 6 in (1.98 m)	202 lb (92 kg)	Sr	Kimball HS	Dallas, TX
F	25	Armani Flannigan	6 ft 8 in (2.03 m)	200 lb (91 kg)	Sr	Central Wyoming	Rockford, IL
F	33	Colin Voss	6 ft 7 in (2.01 m)	240 lb (109 kg)	RS Sr	Northern Oklahoma	Grand Rapids, MI

Head coach

- Tony Benford (New Mexico)

Assistant coach(es)

- Rob Evans (New Mexico State)
- David Anwar (Fitchburg State)
- Scott Monarch (Mississippi Valley State)

Legend

- (C) Team captain
- (S) Suspended
- (I) Ineligible
- (W) Walk-on
- Injured
- Current redshirt

Roster

== Schedule ==
Date time, TV	Rank^{#}	Opponent^{#}	Result	Record	Site (attendance) city, state
Exhibition
11/10/2014*; 7:00 pm		Oklahoma City	W 106–100 ^{OT}	–	The Super Pit (1,306); Denton, TX
Regular season
11/14/2014*; 5:00 pm		Arkansas–Monticello	W 84–62	1–0	The Super Pit (1,442); Denton, TX
11/17/2014*; 7:30 pm		Nicholls State	W 71–57	2–0	The Super Pit (1,367); Denton, TX
11/19/2014*; 7:00 pm		Delaware State	W 62–55	3–0	The Super Pit (1,491); Denton, TX
11/23/2014*; 5:00 pm		Iona	L 58–78	3–1	The Super Pit (2,278); Denton, TX
11/26/2014*; 7:00 pm		Mississippi Valley State	W 67–52	4–1	The Super Pit (1,418); Denton, TX
11/28/2014*; 8:00 pm, SECN		at No. 25 Arkansas	L 73–89	4–2	Bud Walton Arena (14,885); Fayetteville, AR
12/03/2014*; 7:00 pm, FSOK/FCS		at Oklahoma State	L 61–87	4–3	Gallagher-Iba Arena (6,086); Stillwater, OK
12/14/2014*; 3:00 pm		at Stephen F. Austin	L 48–59	4–4	William R. Johnson Coliseum (582); Nacogdoches, TX
12/17/2014*; 11:30 am		Langston	W 78–65	5–4	The Super Pit (2,778); Denton, TX
12/21/2014*; 1:00 pm, FSN		Creighton	W 62–58	6–4	The Super Pit (4,227); Denton, TX
12/23/2014*; 7:00 pm		Prairie View A&M	L 67–70	6–5	The Super Pit (2,117); Denton, TX
12/29/2014*; 7:00 pm, TTSN		at Texas Tech	L 45–60	6–6	United Supermarkets Arena (6,033); Lubbock, TX
01/02/2015; 7:00 pm, ASN		UTEP	L 71–85	6–7 (0–1)	The Super Pit (2,785); Denton, TX
01/04/2015; 2:00 pm, FSN		UTSA	L 61–71	6–8 (0–2)	The Super Pit (1,628); Denton, TX
01/10/2015; 2:00 pm, ASN		at Rice	W 66–63	7–8 (1–2)	Tudor Fieldhouse (1,230); Houston, TX
01/15/2015; 6:00 pm		at Charlotte	L 57–73	7–9 (1–3)	Dale F. Halton Arena (3,694); Charlotte, NC
01/17/2015; 6:00 pm		at Old Dominion	L 50–61	7–10 (1–4)	Ted Constant Convocation Center (8,472); Norfolk, VA
01/22/2015; 7:00 pm		Louisiana Tech	W 73–66	8–10 (2–4)	The Super Pit (3,293); Denton, TX
01/24/2015; 7:00 pm		Southern Miss	L 71–75 ^{OT}	8–11 (2–5)	The Super Pit (3,759); Denton, TX
01/31/2015; 7:00 pm, ASN		Rice	W 75–65	9–11 (3–5)	The Super Pit (4,212); Denton, TX
02/05/2015; 7:00 pm		at WKU	L 59–65	9–12 (3–6)	E. A. Diddle Arena (3,862); Bowling Green, KY
02/07/2015; 6:00 pm		at Marshall	L 73–80	9–13 (3–7)	Cam Henderson Center (5,276); Huntington, WV
02/12/2015; 7:00 pm		UAB	W 67–64	10–13 (4–7)	The Super Pit (2,611); Denton, TX
02/14/2015; 7:00 pm, ASN		Middle Tennessee	W 57–56	11–13 (5–7)	The Super Pit (1,946); Denton, TX
02/19/2015; 6:00 pm		at Florida Atlantic	W 79–72	12–13 (6–7)	FAU Arena (1,108); Boca Raton, FL
02/21/2015; 5:00 pm		at FIU	W 70–56	13–13 (7–7)	U.S. Century Bank Arena (1,408); Miami, FL
02/26/2015; 7:00 pm		Charlotte	W 81–65	14–13 (8–7)	The Super Pit (4,122); Denton, TX
02/28/2015; 4:30 pm, ASN		Old Dominion	L 57–70	14–14 (8–8)	The Super Pit (2,833); Denton, TX
03/05/2015; 8:00 pm		at UTEP	L 60–83	14–15 (8–9)	Don Haskins Center (7,651); El Paso, TX
03/07/2015; 2:00 pm		at UTSA	L 68–69	14–16 (8–10)	Convocation Center (1,245); San Antonio, TX
Conference USA tournament
03/11/2015; 8:30 pm, ASN		vs. Rice; First round	L 54–82	14–17	Birmingham–Jefferson Convention Complex; Birmingham, AL
*Non-conference game. (#) Tournament seedings in parentheses. All times are in Central Time.

== See also ==
- 2014–15 North Texas Mean Green women's basketball team
