= Aleksa Nikolić =

Serbian basketball player (born 1995)

Free agent
- Position: Guard / small forward

Personal information
- Born: March 31, 1995 (age 31) Pančevo, Serbia, FR Yugoslavia
- Listed height: 2.01 m (6 ft 7 in)
- Listed weight: 96 kg (212 lb)

Career information
- College: Marshall (2014–2017)
- NBA draft: 2017: undrafted
- Playing career: 2017–present

Career history
- 2017: Spartak St Petersburg
- 2017–2018: Ilirija
- 2018–2019: FMP
- 2019: Zlatibor
- 2019–2020: Oberwart Gunners
- 2020–2021: Zrinjski Mostar
- 2021–2022: Rakvere Tarvas
- 2022–2023: Juventus Utena

Career highlights
- Serbian League Cup winner (2021)

Aleksa Nikolić (Serbian Cyrillic: Алекса Николић; born March 31, 1995), is a Serbian professional basketball player who last played for Juventus Utena of the Lithuanian Basketball League (LKL). He played college basketball for the Marshall Thundering Herd. Standing 2.01 m (6 ft 7 in), he can play both guard positions, as well as small forward.

== College career ==
Nikolić played for the Marshall Thundering Herd of the Conference USA (NCAA Division I) from 2014 to 2017. Nikolić appeared in all 32 games, including 25 starts in the 2014–15 season. He averaged 5.0 points, 4.1 rebounds and 3.5 assists per game during the regular season. In 2015–16 season, he appeared in the first two games of the year before suffering a season-ending injury at Morehead State on November 24, 2015, which required facial surgery. Nikolić appeared in all 25 games, including 3 starts in the 2016–17 season.

== Professional career ==
Nikolić began his professional career by signing with Russian club Spartak Saint Petersburg on 2 October 2017. Nikolić parted ways with the team on 12 December after appearing in 13 games, in which he averaged 8.5 points per contest.

Nikolić spent the 2017–18 season playing for Ilirija of the Slovenian Premier League (SKL).

In September 2018, he joined FMP of the Basketball League of Serbia. In January 2019, he signed for Zlatibor.

On 30 June 2019, Nikolić signed with the Oberwart Gunners of the Austrian Basketball Superliga.

On 5 January 2020, Nikolić signed with Zrinjski Mostar for the rest of the 2019–20 season. On July 10, 2020, he re-signed with the team for an additional season.

On 31 July 2021, Nikolić signed with Rakvere Tarvas of the Latvian-Estonian Basketball League.

On 10 August 2022, Nikolić signed a three-year (1+1+1) deal with Juventus Utena of the Lithuanian Basketball League (LKL). During the preseason, Nikolić suffered a calf muscle injury which sidelined him until January 2023. On 1 June 2023, he parted ways with the club.
