= 2014–15 Marshall Thundering Herd men's basketball team =

American college basketball season

2014–15 Marshall Thundering Herd men's basketball
- Conference: Conference USA
- Record: 11–21 (7–11 C-USA)
- Head coach: Dan D'Antoni (1st season)
- Assistant coaches: Mark Cline; Scott Rigot; Chris Duhon
- Home arena: Cam Henderson Center

2014–15 Conference USA men's basketball standings
	Conf.				Overall
Team	W		L	PCT	W		L	PCT
Louisiana Tech	15	–	3	.833	27	–	9	.750
Old Dominion	13	–	5	.722	27	–	8	.771
UTEP	13	–	5	.722	22	–	11	.667
WKU	12	–	6	.667	20	–	12	.625
UAB †	12	–	6	.667	20	–	16	.556
Middle Tennessee	9	–	9	.500	19	–	17	.528
FIU	8	–	10	.444	16	–	17	.485
UTSA	8	–	10	.444	14	–	16	.467
North Texas	8	–	10	.444	14	–	17	.452
Rice	8	–	10	.444	12	–	20	.375
Charlotte	7	–	11	.389	14	–	18	.438
Marshall	7	–	11	.389	11	–	21	.344
Southern Miss*	4	–	14	.222	9	–	20	.310
Florida Atlantic	2	–	16	.111	9	–	20	.310
† 2015 C-USA Tournament winner *Ineligible for postseason play due to self-imposed postseason ban

The 2014–15 Marshall Thundering Herd men's basketball team represented Marshall University during the 2014–15 NCAA Division I men's basketball season. The Thundering Herd, led by first year head coach Dan D'Antoni, played their home games at the Cam Henderson Center and were members of Conference USA. They finished the season 11–21, 7–11 in C-USA play to finish in a tie for eleventh place. They lost in the first round of the C-USA tournament to WKU.

== Previous season ==
The Thundering Herd finished the season 11–22, 4–12 in C-USA play to finish in a tie for fourteenth place. They advanced to the second round of the C-USA tournament where they lost to Old Dominion. At the end of the season, head coach Tom Herrion's remaining contract was bought out.

== Preseason ==
=== Departures ===
Name	Number	Pos.	Height	Weight	Year	Hometown	Notes
Kareem Canty	1	G	6'1"	185	RS Freshman	Harlem, NY	Transferred to Auburn
Kevin McNair	4	G	6'1"	180	Freshman	Atlanta, GA	Walk-on didn't return
Yous Mbao	34	C	7'2"	250	RS Senior	Rufisque, Senegal	Graduated

=== Incoming transfers ===
Name	Number	Pos.	Height	Weight	Year	Hometown	Previous School
Stevie Browning	2	G	6'3"	180	Sophomore	Logan, WV	Transferred from Fairmont State. Under NCAA transfer rules, Browning will have to redshirt for the 2014–15 season. Will have three years of remaining eligibility.
Jay Johnson	3	F	6'7"	210	Junior	Versailles, KY	Junior college transfer from John A. Logan College.
James Kelly	24	F	6'7"	246	Junior	Ann Arbor, MI	Transferred from Miami (FL). Under NCAA transfer rules, Kelly will have to redshirt for the 2014–15 season. Will have two years of remaining eligibility.

== Recruiting ==
College recruiting information
Name	Hometown	School	Height	Weight	Commit date
Shane Hall; PF	Paintsville, KY	Johnson Central High School	6 ft 9 in (2.06 m)	210 lb (95 kg)	Sep 25, 2013
Shane Hall; PF	Recruit ratings: Scout: Rivals: (73)				
Aleksa Nikolic; PG	Serbia	Kris Kros Pancevo	6 ft 5 in (1.96 m)	N/A	May 22, 2014
Aleksa Nikolic; PG	Recruit ratings: Scout: Rivals: (NR)				
Overall recruit ranking: Scout: NR Rivals: NR ESPN: NR
Note: In many cases, Scout, Rivals, 247Sports, On3, and ESPN may conflict in their listings of height and weight.; In these cases, the average was taken. ESPN grades are on a 100-point scale.; Sources: "2014 Team Ranking". Rivals.

== Roster ==
2014–15 Marshall Thundering Herd men's basketball team
Players
Coaches

Pos.	#	Name	Height	Weight	Year	Hometown
F	1	Shawn Smith	6 ft 6 in (1.98 m)	228 lb (103 kg)	Sr	Sacramento, California
G	2	Stevie Browning (redshirt)	6 ft 3 in (1.91 m)	180 lb (82 kg)	So	Logan, West Virginia
F	3	Jay Johnson	6 ft 7 in (2.01 m)	232 lb (105 kg)	Jr	Versailles, Kentucky
F	5	Cheikh Sane	6 ft 9 in (2.06 m)	225 lb (102 kg)	Sr	Dakar, Senegal
G	14	C. J. Burks (W)	6 ft 3 in (1.91 m)	193 lb (88 kg)	Fr	Martinsburg, West Virginia
G	15	DeVince Boykins	6 ft 4 in (1.93 m)	210 lb (95 kg)	RS Jr	Forest City, North Carolina
G	21	Aleksa Nikolić	6 ft 5 in (1.96 m)	188 lb (85 kg)	Fr	Pančevo, Serbia
G	23	Justin Edmonds	6 ft 4 in (1.93 m)	220 lb (100 kg)	RS Jr	Albion, Michigan
F	24	James Kelly (redshirt)	6 ft 7 in (2.01 m)	241 lb (109 kg)	Jr	Ann Arbor, Michigan
F	25	Ryan Taylor	6 ft 5 in (1.96 m)	225 lb (102 kg)	RS So	Indianapolis, Indiana
C	31	JP Kambola	6 ft 9 in (2.06 m)	244 lb (111 kg)	RS Sr	Toronto, Ontario, Canada
G	32	Tamron Manning	6 ft 4 in (1.93 m)	210 lb (95 kg)	Jr	Georgetown, Kentucky
G	33	Brett Bowling	6 ft 4 in (1.93 m)	192 lb (87 kg)	Fr	Pineville, West Virginia
G	35	Austin Loop	6 ft 4 in (1.93 m)	207 lb (94 kg)	RS So	South Webster, Ohio
F	50	Milan Mijovic	6 ft 9 in (2.06 m)	260 lb (118 kg)	Fr	Belgrade, Serbia

Head coach

- Dan D'Antoni (Marshall)

Assistant coach(es)

- Mark Cline (Wake Forest)
- Scott Rigot (Buffalo)
- Chris Duhon (Duke)

Legend

- (C) Team captain
- (S) Suspended
- (I) Ineligible
- (W) Walk-on
- Injured
- Current redshirt

Roster

== Schedule ==
Date time, TV	Rank^{#}	Opponent^{#}	Result	Record	Site (attendance) city, state
Exhibition
11/08/2014*; 4:00 pm		Concord	W 92–80		Cam Henderson Center; Huntington, WV
Regular season
11/14/2014*; 7:00 pm		Jacksonville State; Global Sports Showcase	W 74–55	1–0	Cam Henderson Center (5,463); Huntington, WV
11/16/2014*; 4:00 pm		Savannah State; Global Sports Showcase	W 66–47	2–0	Cam Henderson Center (4,789); Huntington, WV
11/18/2014*; 7:00 pm		West Virginia Tech	W 87–65	3–0	Cam Henderson Center (4,984); Huntington, WV
11/21/2014*; 9:00 pm, ESPNU		at No. 7 Louisville; Global Sports Showcase	L 67–85	3–1	KFC Yum! Center (21,661); Louisville, KY
11/26/2014*; 8:00 pm, ASN		Morehead State	L 68–77	3–2	Cam Henderson Center (5,077); Huntington, WV
11/28/2014*; 8:00 pm		Cleveland State; Global Sports Showcase	L 59–68	3–3	Cam Henderson Center (4,991); Huntington, WV
12/01/2014*; 7:30 pm, CBSSN		South Carolina	L 59–77	3–4	Cam Henderson Center (5,013); Huntington, WV
12/06/2014*; 6:00 pm, CBSSN		Penn State	L 69–73	3–5	Cam Henderson Center (5,158); Huntington, WV
12/14/2014*; 4:30 pm, RTPT		vs. No. 22 West Virginia; Chesapeake Energy Capital Classic	L 66–69	3–6	Charleston Civic Center (10,749); Charleston, WV
12/16/2014*; 7:00 pm		King	W 90–76	4–6	Cam Henderson Center (4,608); Huntington, WV
12/20/2014*; 3:00 pm		at Arkansas State	L 58–67	4–7	Convocation Center (1,781); Jonesboro, AR
12/22/2014*; 10:00 pm		at Nevada	L 55–83	4–8	Lawlor Events Center (4,738); Reno, NV
12/30/2014*; 7:00 pm		at Akron	L 63–70	4–9	James A. Rhodes Arena (2,937); Akron, OH
01/04/2015; 3:00 pm		at WKU	L 62–81	4–10 (0–1)	E. A. Diddle Arena (3,597); Bowling Green, KY
01/08/2015; 7:00 pm		No. 25 Old Dominion	L 51–72	4–11 (0–2)	Cam Henderson Center (4,661); Huntington, WV
01/10/2015; 7:00 pm		Charlotte	L 72–77	4–12 (0–3)	Cam Henderson Center (5,013); Huntington, WV
01/15/2015; 7:30 pm		at FIU	L 62–66 ^{OT}	4–13 (0–4)	FIU Arena (N/A); Miami, FL
01/17/2015; 5:30 pm, ASN		at Florida Atlantic	L 62–76	4–14 (0–5)	FAU Arena (1,167); Boca Raton, FL
01/22/2015; 7:00 pm		UTSA	L 68–82	4–15 (0–6)	Cam Henderson Center (4,882); Huntington, WV
01/24/2015; 3:00 pm, ASN		UTEP	W 78–71	5–15 (1–6)	Cam Henderson Center (5,302); Huntington, WV
01/29/2015; 8:00 pm		at Southern Miss	W 69–54	6–15 (2–6)	Reed Green Coliseum (3,392); Hattiesburg, MS
01/31/2015; 5:30 pm, ASN		at Louisiana Tech	L 57–81	6–16 (2–7)	Thomas Assembly Center (4,731); Ruston, LA
02/05/2015; 7:00 pm		Rice	W 69–55	7–16 (3–7)	Cam Henderson Center (4,844); Huntington, WV
02/07/2015; 7:00 pm		North Texas	W 80–73	8–16 (4–7)	Cam Henderson Center (5,276); Huntington, WV
02/14/2015; 5:30 pm, ASN		WKU	W 87–82	9–16 (5–7)	Cam Henderson Center (6,135); Huntington, WV
02/19/2015; 5:00 pm		at Middle Tennessee	L 51–90	9–17 (5–8)	Murphy Center (5,101); Murfreesboro, TN
02/21/2015; 8:00 pm		at UAB	L 54–78	9–18 (5–9)	Bartow Arena (4,068); Birmingham, AL
02/26/2015; 8:00 pm, ASN		FIU	W 87–69	10–18 (6–9)	Cam Henderson Center (4,886); Huntington, WV
02/28/2015; 7:00 pm		Florida Atlantic	W 79–63	11–18 (7–9)	Cam Henderson Center (5,745); Huntington, WV
03/05/2015; 8:00 pm, ASN		at Old Dominion	L 50–67	11–19 (7–10)	Ted Constant Convocation Center (7,114); Norfolk, VA
03/07/2015; 7:00 pm		at Charlotte	L 73–86	11–20 (7–11)	Dale F. Halton Arena (5,434); Charlotte, NC
Conference USA tournament
03/11/2015; 7:00 pm, ASN	(12)	vs. (5) WKU; First round	L 45–59	11–21	Birmingham–Jefferson Convention Complex; Birmingham, AL
*Non-conference game. ^{#}Rankings from AP poll. (#) Tournament seedings in parentheses. All times are in Eastern Time.
