= 2014–15 Rice Owls men's basketball team =

American college basketball season

2014–15 Rice Owls men's basketball
- Conference: Conference USA
- Record: 12–20 (8–10 C-USA)
- Head coach: Mike Rhoades (1st season)
- Assistant coaches: Carlin Hartman; Scott Pera; J.D. Byers
- Home arena: Tudor Fieldhouse

2014–15 Conference USA men's basketball standings
	Conf.				Overall
Team	W		L	PCT	W		L	PCT
Louisiana Tech	15	–	3	.833	27	–	9	.750
Old Dominion	13	–	5	.722	27	–	8	.771
UTEP	13	–	5	.722	22	–	11	.667
WKU	12	–	6	.667	20	–	12	.625
UAB †	12	–	6	.667	20	–	16	.556
Middle Tennessee	9	–	9	.500	19	–	17	.528
FIU	8	–	10	.444	16	–	17	.485
UTSA	8	–	10	.444	14	–	16	.467
North Texas	8	–	10	.444	14	–	17	.452
Rice	8	–	10	.444	12	–	20	.375
Charlotte	7	–	11	.389	14	–	18	.438
Marshall	7	–	11	.389	11	–	21	.344
Southern Miss*	4	–	14	.222	9	–	20	.310
Florida Atlantic	2	–	16	.111	9	–	20	.310
† 2015 C-USA Tournament winner *Ineligible for postseason play due to self-imposed postseason ban

The 2014–15 Rice Owls men's basketball team represented Rice University during the 2014–15 NCAA Division I men's basketball season. The Owls, led by first year head coach Mike Rhoades, played their home games at Tudor Fieldhouse and were members of Conference USA. They finished the season 12–20, 8–10 in C-USA play to finish in a four way tie for seventh place. They advanced to the quarterfinals of the C-USA tournament where they lost to Louisiana Tech.

== Previous season ==
The Owls finished the season 7–23, 2–14 in C-USA play to finish in last place. They lost in the first round of the C-USA tournament to North Texas.

== Departures ==
=== Offseason Departures ===
Name	Number	Pos.	Height	Weight	Year	Hometown	Notes
Sean Obi	3	F	6'9"	265	Freshman	Kaduna, Nigeria	Transferred to Duke
Nizar Kapic	4	G/F	6'6"	195	RS Freshman	Sankt Pölten, Austria	Left Team (Injury)
Keith Washington	5	G	6'1"	180	Sophomore	Philadelphia, PA	Left Rice (Personal)
Hunter Eggers	15	G	6'0"	200	Freshman	Greenwich, CT	Left Team (Personal)
Drew Bender	21	G	6'5"	195	Freshman	Phoenix, AZ	Transferred to Northern Colorado
Austin Ramljak	42	G	6'3"	200	Senior	Thousand Oaks, CA	Graduated
Bahrom Firozgary	44	F	6'8"	200	Senior	Houston, TX	Graduated

=== In-Season Departures ===
Name	Number	Pos.	Height	Weight	Year	Hometown	Notes
Maurice Rivers	12	F	6'6"	190	Freshman	Atlanta, Georgia	Personal
Ross Wilson	11	F	6'6"	215	Junior	Gosforth, England	Injury
Oliver Xu	3	G	6'2"	170	Freshman	Hong Kong	Personal
Joey Burbach	2	G	6'5"	190	Sophomore	Port Washington, Wisconsin	Personal

=== Incoming transfers ===
Name	Number	Pos.	Height	Weight	Year	Hometown	Previous School
Egor Koulechov	4	F	6'5"	205	Sophomore	Volgograd, Russia	Transferred from Arizona State. Under NCAA transfer rules, Koulechev will have to sit out for the 2014–15 season. Will have three years of remaining eligibility.
Van Green	31	G	6'3"	185	Senior	Birmingham, Alabama	Transferred from Columbia. Transferred under NCAA graduate transfer exception, Green will not have to sit out for the 2014–15 season.

== Recruiting class of 2014 ==
College recruiting information
Name	Hometown	School	Height	Weight	Commit date
Bishop Mency; SF	Chino Hills, CA	Chino Hills High School	6 ft 5 in (1.96 m)	185 lb (84 kg)	Apr 1, 2014
Bishop Mency; SF	Recruit ratings: Scout: Rivals: (65)				
Jordan Reed; SG	Lucas, TX	Lovejoy High School	5 ft 11 in (1.80 m)	160 lb (73 kg)	Sep 30, 2013
Jordan Reed; SG	Recruit ratings: Scout: Rivals: (NR)				
Maurice Rivers; SG	Atlanta, GA	Columbia High School	6 ft 6 in (1.98 m)	190 lb (86 kg)	Nov 16, 2013
Maurice Rivers; SG	Recruit ratings: Scout: Rivals: (NR)				
Nate Pollard; C	Bountiful, UT	Impact Basketball Academy	7 ft 0 in (2.13 m)	205 lb (93 kg)	Apr 23, 2014
Nate Pollard; C	Recruit ratings: Scout: Rivals: (NR)				
Jeremy Jones; SF	San Antonio, TX	East Central High School	6 ft 5 in (1.96 m)	205 lb (93 kg)	Dec 1, 2014
Jeremy Jones; SF	Recruit ratings: Scout: Rivals: (NR)				
Overall recruit ranking:
Note: In many cases, Scout, Rivals, 247Sports, On3, and ESPN may conflict in their listings of height and weight.; In these cases, the average was taken. ESPN grades are on a 100-point scale.; Sources: "2014 Team Ranking". Rivals.

=== Recruiting class of 2015 ===
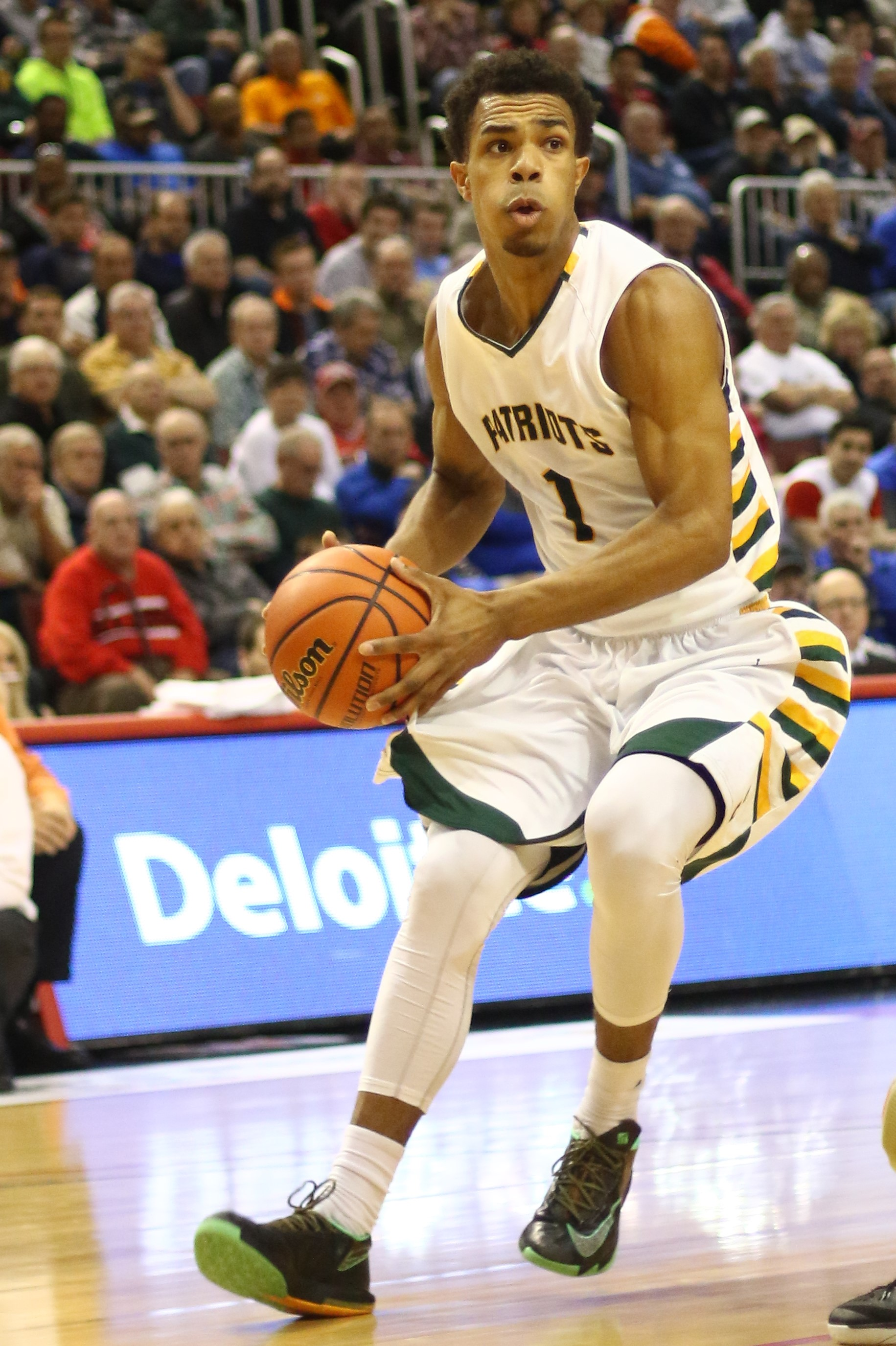
Connor Cashaw helped Stevenson (IL) win the 2015 IHSA Class 4A championship.

College recruiting information
Name	Hometown	School	Height	Weight	Commit date
Marcus Evans; PG	Virginia Beach, VA	Cape Henry Collegiate School	6 ft 2 in (1.88 m)	185 lb (84 kg)	Jun 29, 2014
Marcus Evans; PG	Recruit ratings: Scout: Rivals: 247Sports: (NR)				
Connor Cashaw; SG	Lincolnshire, IL	Adlai E. Stevenson High School	6 ft 4 in (1.93 m)	185 lb (84 kg)	Sep 30, 2014
Connor Cashaw; SG	Recruit ratings: Scout: Rivals: (NR)				
Marquez Letcher-Ellis; SF	Houston, TX	Montverde Academy	6 ft 6 in (1.98 m)	170 lb (77 kg)	Oct 25, 2014
Marquez Letcher-Ellis; SF	Recruit ratings: Scout: Rivals: 247Sports: (79)				
Overall recruit ranking:
Note: In many cases, Scout, Rivals, 247Sports, On3, and ESPN may conflict in their listings of height and weight.; In these cases, the average was taken. ESPN grades are on a 100-point scale.; Sources: "2015 Team Ranking". Rivals.

== Roster ==
2014–15 Rice Owls men's basketball team
Players
Coaches

Pos.	#	Name	Height	Weight	Year	Hometown
G	0	Dan Peera	6 ft 0 in (1.83 m)	180 lb (82 kg)	Sr	San Ramon, California
G	1	Max Guercy	5 ft 9 in (1.75 m)	170 lb (77 kg)	Jr	Arleta, California
G/F	4	Egor Koulechov (I)	6 ft 5 in (1.96 m)	210 lb (95 kg)	So	Volgograd, Russia
G	5	Jordan Reed	5 ft 11 in (1.8 m)	170 lb (77 kg)	Fr	Lucas, Texas
F	10	Denzel Davis (injured)	6 ft 8 in (2.03 m)	215 lb (98 kg)	RS Fr	Orlando, Florida
G	15	Bishop Mency	6 ft 5 in (1.96 m)	185 lb (84 kg)	Fr	Chino Hills, California
F	20	Jeremy Jones	6 ft 7 in (2.01 m)	205 lb (93 kg)	Fr	San Antonio, Texas
G	22	Marcus Jackson	6 ft 3 in (1.91 m)	175 lb (79 kg)	So	Acton, California
G	24	J. T. Trauber (W)	5 ft 10 in (1.78 m)	165 lb (75 kg)	Fr	Houston, Texas
G	31	Van Green	6 ft 3 in (1.91 m)	185 lb (84 kg)	Sr	Birmingham, Alabama
F	41	Seth Gearhart (C)	6 ft 7 in (2.01 m)	215 lb (98 kg)	Sr	Wilsonville, Oregon
C	45	Nate Pollard	7 ft 1 in (2.16 m)	220 lb (100 kg)	Fr	Bountiful, Utah
C	54	Andrew Drone	6 ft 10 in (2.08 m)	260 lb (118 kg)	So	Junction, Illinois

Head coach

- Mike Rhoades

Assistant coach(es)

- Carlin Hartman
- Scott Pera
- J.D. Byers

Legend

- (C) Team captain
- (S) Suspended
- (I) Ineligible
- (W) Walk-on
- Injured
- Current redshirt

Roster
Last update: 2014-09-05

== Schedule ==
Date time, TV	Rank^{#}	Opponent^{#}	Result	Record	Site (attendance) city, state
Exhibition
11/08/2014*; 5:00 pm		LeTourneau	W 82–64	–	Tudor Fieldhouse (712); Houston, TX
Regular season
11/14/2014*; 9:00 pm, P12N		at Oregon State	L 54–67	0–1	Gill Coliseum (4,759); Corvallis, OR
11/19/2014*; 7:00 pm		Prairie View A&M	W 68–64	1–1	Tudor Fieldhouse (1,092); Houston, TX
11/22/2014*; 7:00 pm		William & Mary	L 65–69	1–2	Tudor Fieldhouse (1,195); Houston, TX
11/27/2014*; 8:30 pm, CBSSN		vs. Mercer; Great Alaska Shootout quarterfinals	L 71–77 ^{OT}	1–3	Alaska Airlines Center (2,366); Anchorage, AK
11/28/2014*; 5:00 pm		vs. Washington State; Great Alaska Shootout consolation round	L 74–76	1–4	Alaska Airlines Center (2,554); Anchorage, AK
11/29/2014*; 3:00 pm		at Alaska Anchorage; Great Alaska Shootout 7th place game	L 54–65	1–5	Alaska Airlines Center (2,398); Anchorage, AK
12/03/2014*; 7:00 pm		Houston Baptist	L 55–58	1–6	Tudor Fieldhouse (1,139); Houston, TX
12/06/2014*; 7:00 pm		St. Edward's	W 54–49	2–6	Tudor Fieldhouse (1,613); Houston, TX
12/18/2014*; 11:30 am		St. Thomas	W 72–61	3–6	Tudor Fieldhouse (4,502); Houston, TX
12/22/2014*; 7:00 pm		at Lamar	L 72–79 ^{OT}	3–7	Montagne Center (1,740); Beaumont, TX
12/29/2014*; 12:00 pm, LHN		at No. 11 Texas	L 55–66	3–8	Frank Erwin Center (9,373); Austin, TX
01/02/2015; 7:00 pm		UTSA	W 67–52	4–8 (1–0)	Tudor Fieldhouse (1,242); Houston, TX
01/04/2015; 2:30 pm, ASN		UTEP	L 57–66	4–9 (1–1)	Tudor Fieldhouse (1,220); Houston, TX
01/10/2015; 2:00 pm, ASN		North Texas	L 63–66	4–10 (1–2)	Tudor Fieldhouse (1,230); Houston, TX
01/15/2015; 6:00 pm		at Old Dominion	L 53–63	4–11 (1–3)	Ted Constant Convocation Center (7,457); Norfolk, VA
01/17/2015; 6:00 pm		at Charlotte	W 73–68 ^{OT}	5–11 (2–3)	Dale F. Halton Arena (4,318); Charlotte, NC
01/22/2015; 7:00 pm		Southern Miss	W 58–56	6–11 (3–3)	Tudor Fieldhouse (985); Houston, TX
01/24/2015; 7:00 pm		Louisiana Tech	L 45–58	6–12 (3–4)	Tudor Fieldhouse (2,613); Houston, TX
01/28/2015*; 7:00 pm, ESPN3		at Houston; Bayou Cup	L 48–59	6–13	Hofheinz Pavilion (3,465); Houston, TX
01/31/2015; 7:00 pm, ASN		at North Texas	L 65–75	6–14 (3–5)	UNT Coliseum (4,212); Denton, TX
02/05/2015; 6:00 pm		at Marshall	L 55–69	6–15 (3–6)	Cam Henderson Center (4,844); Huntington, WV
02/07/2015; 7:00 pm, FCS		at WKU	W 72–68	7–15 (4–6)	E. A. Diddle Arena (5,071); Bowling Green, KY
02/12/2015; 7:00 pm		Middle Tennessee	W 71–68 ^{2OT}	8–15 (5–6)	Tudor Fieldhouse (1,341); Houston, TX
02/14/2015; 7:00 pm		UAB	W 82–73 ^{2OT}	9–15 (6–6)	Tudor Fieldhouse (1,647); Houston, TX
02/19/2015; 7:00 pm, ASN		at FIU	L 56–60	9–16 (6–7)	FIU Arena (1,051); Miami, FL
02/21/2015; 6:00 pm		at Florida Atlantic	W 76–69	10–16 (7–7)	FAU Arena (1,481); Boca Raton, FL
02/26/2015; 7:00 pm		Old Dominion	L 54–63	10–17 (7–8)	Tudor Fieldhouse (1,506); Houston, TX
02/28/2015; 7:00 pm		Charlotte	L 76–77	10–18 (7–9)	Tudor Fieldhouse (4,653); Houston, TX
03/05/2015; 7:00 pm		at UTSA	W 76–74	11–18 (8–9)	Convocation Center (1,204); San Antonio, TX
03/07/2015; 3:00 pm		at UTEP	L 65–68	11–19 (8–10)	Don Haskins Center (8,574); El Paso, TX
Conference USA tournament
03/11/2015; 8:30 pm, ASN		vs. North Texas; First round	W 82–54	12–19	Birmingham–Jefferson Convention Complex (4,695); Birmingham, AL
03/12/2015; 8:30 pm, ASN		vs. Louisiana Tech; Quarterfinal	L 64–70	12–20	Birmingham–Jefferson Convention Complex (6,922); Birmingham, AL
*Non-conference game. ^{#}Rankings from AP Poll. (#) Tournament seedings in parentheses. All times are in Central Time.

== See also ==
2014–15 Rice Owls women's basketball team
