= 2014–15 UTSA Roadrunners men's basketball team =

American college basketball season

2014–15 UTSA Roadrunners men's basketball
- Conference: Conference USA
- Record: 14–16 (8–10 C-USA)
- Head coach: Brooks Thompson (9th season)
- Assistant coaches: Dan O'Dowd; Robert Guster; Jeff Renegar
- Home arena: Convocation Center

2014–15 Conference USA men's basketball standings
	Conf.				Overall
Team	W		L	PCT	W		L	PCT
Louisiana Tech	15	–	3	.833	27	–	9	.750
Old Dominion	13	–	5	.722	27	–	8	.771
UTEP	13	–	5	.722	22	–	11	.667
WKU	12	–	6	.667	20	–	12	.625
UAB †	12	–	6	.667	20	–	16	.556
Middle Tennessee	9	–	9	.500	19	–	17	.528
FIU	8	–	10	.444	16	–	17	.485
UTSA	8	–	10	.444	14	–	16	.467
North Texas	8	–	10	.444	14	–	17	.452
Rice	8	–	10	.444	12	–	20	.375
Charlotte	7	–	11	.389	14	–	18	.438
Marshall	7	–	11	.389	11	–	21	.344
Southern Miss*	4	–	14	.222	9	–	20	.310
Florida Atlantic	2	–	16	.111	9	–	20	.310
† 2015 C-USA Tournament winner *Ineligible for postseason play due to self-imposed postseason ban

The 2014–15 UTSA Roadrunners men's basketball team represented the University of Texas at San Antonio during the 2014–15 NCAA Division I men's basketball season. The Roadrunners, led by ninth year head coach Brooks Thompson, played their home games at the Convocation Center and were members of Conference USA. They finished the season 14–16, 8–10 in C-USA play in a 4-way tie for seventh place. They lost in the first round of the C-USA tournament to FIU.

== Previous season ==
The Roadrunners finished the season 11–22, 4–12 in C-USA play to finished the season 8–22, 4–12 in C-USA play to finish in a tie for fourteenth place. They lost in the first round of the C-USA tournament to East Carolina.

== Departures ==
Name	Number	Pos.	Height	Weight	Year	Hometown	Notes
Devon Agusi	1	G	6'0"	170	Senior	Dallas, TX	Graduated
Hyjii Thomas	2	G	6'1"	160	Senior	Houston, TX	Graduated
Danté Willis	4	G	6'3"	185	Sophomore	Kingwood, TX	Left the team
Trey Moore	11	G	5'10"	175	Freshman	Louisville, KY	Walk-on didn't return
Edrico McGregor	20	F/C	6'7"	225	Senior	Nassau, Bahamas	Graduated
Jordan Sims	32	G/F	6'4"	185	Senior	El Mirage, AZ	Graduated
Tyler Wood	42	F	6'6"	230	Senior	San Antonio, TX	Graduated

=== Incoming transfers ===
Name	Number	Pos.	Height	Weight	Year	Hometown	Previous School
Ryan Bowie	14	G	6'0"	180	Junior	Lewisville, TX	Junior college transfer from Iowa Western Community College.
Arroyo Edwards		G	6'5"	190	Junior	Milwaukee, WI	Junior college transfer from Missouri State University–West Plains.

== Class of 2014 recruits ==
College recruiting information
Name	Hometown	School	Height	Weight	Commit date
Austin Karrer; SG	New Braunfels, TX	Canyon High School	6 ft 3 in (1.91 m)	175 lb (79 kg)	Oct 17, 2013
Austin Karrer; SG	Recruit ratings: Scout: Rivals: (NR)				
James Ringholt; PF	Brisbane, Australia	Brisbane Boys' College	6 ft 10 in (2.08 m)	210 lb (95 kg)	Nov 30, 2013
James Ringholt; PF	Recruit ratings: Scout: Rivals: (NR)				
Christian Wilson; SG	Cathedral City, CA	Notre Dame Prep	6 ft 2 in (1.88 m)	180 lb (82 kg)	Nov 10, 2013
Christian Wilson; SG	Recruit ratings: Scout: Rivals: (NR)				
Edwin Olympio; SG	Phoenix, AZ	Westwind Prep Academy	6 ft 5 in (1.96 m)	180 lb (82 kg)	May 10, 2014
Edwin Olympio; SG	Recruit ratings: Scout: Rivals: (NR)				
Overall recruit ranking:
Note: In many cases, Scout, Rivals, 247Sports, On3, and ESPN may conflict in their listings of height and weight.; In these cases, the average was taken. ESPN grades are on a 100-point scale.; Sources: "2014 Team Ranking". Rivals.

== Roster ==
2014–15 UTSA Roadrunners men's basketball team
Players
Coaches

Pos.	#	Name	Height	Weight	Year	Previous school	Hometown
G	0	James Williams	6 ft 4 in (1.93 m)	190 lb (86 kg)	Jr	Logan JC	Arlington, TX
G	3	Edwin Olympio	6 ft 4 in (1.93 m)	185 lb (84 kg)	Fr	Westwind Prep Academy	Marseille, France
G	4	Gino Littles (W)	6 ft 0 in (1.83 m)	155 lb (70 kg)	Fr	Desert Mountain HS	Phoenix, AZ
G	5	Tyler Flores (W)	6 ft 4 in (1.93 m)	220 lb (100 kg)	Fr	Saginaw HS	Saginaw, TX
G	10	Christian Wilson	6 ft 2 in (1.88 m)	180 lb (82 kg)	Fr	Notre Dame Prep	Baton Rouge, LA
G	11	Austin Karrer	6 ft 3 in (1.91 m)	175 lb (79 kg)	Fr	Canyon HS	New Braunfels, TX
F	12	Jeromie Hill	6 ft 8 in (2.03 m)	250 lb (113 kg)	Sr	Australian Institute of Sport	Cairns, Australia
G	14	Ryan Bowie	6 ft 1 in (1.85 m)	175 lb (79 kg)	Jr	Iowa Western CC	Lewisville, TX
C	15	Lucas O'Brien	6 ft 10 in (2.08 m)	220 lb (100 kg)	Jr	Perry HS	Chandler, AZ
G	22	George Matthews	6 ft 5 in (1.96 m)	220 lb (100 kg)	RS Jr	Utah	Phoenix, AZ
F	24	Phillip Jones	6 ft 6 in (1.98 m)	200 lb (91 kg)	So	Pine Woods HS	Freeport, Bahamas
C	32	James Ringholt	6 ft 10 in (2.08 m)	210 lb (95 kg)	Fr	Brisbane Boys' College	Rockhampton, Australia
G	34	Larry Lewis, Jr.	6 ft 2 in (1.88 m)	175 lb (79 kg)	RS Fr	Westwind Prep Academy	Scottsdale, AZ
G	44	Keon Lewis	6 ft 2 in (1.88 m)	180 lb (82 kg)	Sr	North Idaho College	Seattle, WA
C	45	Kaj-Björn Sherman	7 ft 0 in (2.13 m)	250 lb (113 kg)	Sr	North Idaho College	Mercer Island, WA

Head coach

- Brooks Thompson (Oklahoma State)

Assistant coach(es)

- Dan O'Dowd (Bethany (KS))
- Robert Guster (Missouri S&T)
- Jeff Renegar (Southwestern (KS))

Legend

- (C) Team captain
- (S) Suspended
- (I) Ineligible
- (W) Walk-on
- Injured
- Current redshirt

Roster

== Schedule ==
Date time, TV	Rank^{#}	Opponent^{#}	Result	Record	Site (attendance) city, state
Exhibition
11/06/2014*; 7:00 pm		Southeastern Oklahoma State	W 101–80		Convocation Center (810); San Antonio, TX
Regular season
11/14/2014*; 7:00 pm		Huston–Tillotson	W 92–74	1–0	Convocation Center (938); San Antonio, TX
11/17/2014*; 7:00 pm		Texas–Pan American	L 62–63	1–1	Convocation Center (790); San Antonio, TX
11/22/2014*; 2:00 pm, ASN		Texas State; I-35 Rivalry	W 80–67	2–1	Convocation Center (1,116); San Antonio, TX
11/25/2014*; 7:00 pm		Loyola (IL)	L 57–71	2–2	Convocation Center (829); San Antonio, TX
11/30/2014*; 12:00 pm		Southern Utah	L 92–93	2–3	Convocation Center (760); San Antonio, TX
12/03/2014*; 8:30 pm		at Northern Arizona	W 88–83 ^{OT}	3–3	Walkup Skydome (1,147); Flagstaff, AZ
12/06/2014*; 2:00 pm, P12N		at Washington State	L 71–91	3–4	Beasley Coliseum (1,915); Pullman, WA
12/15/2014*; 7:30 pm		at Texas A&M–Corpus Christi	W 73–60	4–4	American Bank Center (1,019); Corpus Christi, TX
12/20/2014*; 7:00 pm		at TCU	L 57–88	4–5	Wilkerson-Greines Activity Center (4,089); Fort Worth, TX
12/30/2014*; 1:00 pm		Cameron	W 79–68	5–5	Convocation Center (586); San Antonio, TX
01/02/2015; 7:00 pm		at Rice	L 52–67	5–6 (0–1)	Tudor Fieldhouse (1,242); Houston, TX
01/04/2015; 2:00 pm, FSN		at North Texas	W 71–61	6–6 (1–1)	The Super Pit (1,628); Denton, TX
01/08/2015; 7:00 pm, ASN		Southern Miss	W 77–57	7–6 (2–1)	Convocation Center (760); San Antonio, TX
01/10/2015; 2:00 pm		Louisiana Tech	L 72–84	7–7 (2–2)	Convocation Center (1,084); San Antonio, TX
01/12/2015*; 7:00 pm		at Texas–Pan American	W 68–43	8–7	UTPA Fieldhouse (1,096); Edinburg, TX
01/17/2015; 2:00 pm		UTEP	L 55–73	8–8 (2–3)	Convocation Center (1,737); San Antonio, TX
01/22/2015; 6:00 pm		at Marshall	W 82–68	9–8 (3–3)	Cam Henderson Center (4,882); Huntington, WV
01/24/2015; 2:00 pm		at WKU	L 74–83	9–9 (3–4)	E. A. Diddle Arena (5,839); Bowling Green, KY
01/29/2015; 7:00 pm, ASN		Middle Tennessee	W 69–58	10–9 (4–4)	Convocation Center (1,005); San Antonio, TX
01/31/2015; 2:00 pm		UAB	L 57–65	10–10 (4–5)	Convocation Center (1,252); San Antonio, TX
02/05/2015; 6:30 pm		at FIU	W 74–63	11–10 (5–5)	FIU Arena (919); Miami, FL
02/07/2015; 6:00 pm		at Florida Atlantic	W 74–59	12–10 (6–5)	FAU Arena (1,175); Boca Raton, FL
02/12/2015; 7:00 pm, ASN		Old Dominion	W 72–67	13–10 (7–5)	Convocation Center (1,168); San Antonio, TX
02/14/2015; 2:00 pm		Charlotte	L 81–89	13–11 (7–6)	Convocation Center (982); San Antonio, TX
02/21/2015; 8:00 pm		at UTEP	L 62–69	13–12 (7–7)	Don Haskins Center (10,884); El Paso, TX
02/26/2015; 7:00 pm		at Southern Miss	L 66–70	13–13 (7–8)	Reed Green Coliseum (2,990); Hattiesburg, MS
02/28/2015; 6:00 pm, FS1		at Louisiana Tech	L 66–76	13–14 (7–9)	Thomas Assembly Center (5,328); Ruston, LA
03/05/2015; 7:00 pm		Rice	L 74–76	13–15 (7–10)	Convocation Center (1,204); San Antonio, TX
03/07/2015; 2:00 pm		North Texas	W 69–68	14–15 (8–10)	Convocation Center (1,245); San Antonio, TX
Conference USA tournament
03/11/2015; 12:00 pm, ASN		vs. FIU; First round	L 54–57	14–16	Birmingham–Jefferson Convention Complex; Birmingham, AL
*Non-conference game. ^{#}Rankings from AP Poll. (#) Tournament seedings in parentheses. All times are in Central Time.
