= 2014–15 Florida Atlantic Owls men's basketball team =

American college basketball season

2014–15 Florida Atlantic Owls men's basketball
- Conference: Conference USA
- Record: 9–20 (2–16 C-USA)
- Head coach: Michael Curry (1st season)
- Assistant coaches: Eric Snow; Tim Kaine; Peter Gash
- Home arena: FAU Arena

2014–15 Conference USA men's basketball standings
	Conf.				Overall
Team	W		L	PCT	W		L	PCT
Louisiana Tech	15	–	3	.833	27	–	9	.750
Old Dominion	13	–	5	.722	27	–	8	.771
UTEP	13	–	5	.722	22	–	11	.667
WKU	12	–	6	.667	20	–	12	.625
UAB †	12	–	6	.667	20	–	16	.556
Middle Tennessee	9	–	9	.500	19	–	17	.528
FIU	8	–	10	.444	16	–	17	.485
UTSA	8	–	10	.444	14	–	16	.467
North Texas	8	–	10	.444	14	–	17	.452
Rice	8	–	10	.444	12	–	20	.375
Charlotte	7	–	11	.389	14	–	18	.438
Marshall	7	–	11	.389	11	–	21	.344
Southern Miss*	4	–	14	.222	9	–	20	.310
Florida Atlantic	2	–	16	.111	9	–	20	.310
† 2015 C-USA Tournament winner *Ineligible for postseason play due to self-imposed postseason ban

The 2014–15 Florida Atlantic Owls men's basketball team represented Florida Atlantic University during the 2014–15 NCAA Division I men's basketball season. The Owls, led by first year head coach Michael Curry, played their home games at the FAU Arena, and were members of Conference USA. They finished the season 9–20, 2–16 in C-USA play to finish in last place. They failed to qualify for the C-USA tournament.

== Previous season ==
The Owls the season 10–22, 5–11 in C-USA play to finish in a tie for twelfth place. They lost in the first round of the C-USA tournament to Marshall.

== Departures ==
Name	Number	Pos.	Height	Weight	Year	Hometown	Notes
Dragan Sekelja	3	C	7'0"	250	RS Senior	Zagreb, Croatia	Graduated
Richard Morrow	15	G	6'4"	198	RS Junior	Cleveland, Ohio	Left the team
Tyler Pate	21	G	6'3"	190	Freshman	Port Aransas, Texas	Transferred
Pablo Bertone	25	G	6'4"	198	Senior	Arroyito, Argentina	Graduated

=== Incoming transfers ===
Name	Number	Pos.	Height	Weight	Year	Hometown	Previous school
Adonis Filer	3	G	6'2"	190	Junior	Chicago, Illinois	Transferred from Clemson. Under NCAA transfer rules, Filer will have to redshirt for the 2014–15 season. Will have two years of remaining eligibility.
Solomon Poole	23	G	6'0"	190	Junior	Jacksonville, Florida	Transferred from Georgia Tech. Under NCAA transfer rules, Poole will have to redshirt for the 2014–15 season. Will have two years of remaining eligibility.

== Recruiting class of 2014 ==
College recruiting information
Name	Hometown	School	Height	Weight	Commit date
C.J. Turman; C	Madison, Georgia	Morgan County High School	6 ft 9 in (2.06 m)	215 lb (98 kg)	May 4, 2014
C.J. Turman; C	Recruit ratings: Scout: Rivals: (79)				
Traevis Graham; SF	Stuart, Florida	Martin County High School	6 ft 5 in (1.96 m)	185 lb (84 kg)	Oct 19, 2013
Traevis Graham; SF	Recruit ratings: Scout: Rivals: (NR)				
Maceo Baston Jr. SG	Detroit, Michigan	Detroit Country Day School	6 ft 5 in (1.96 m)	N/A	Apr 12, 2014
Maceo Baston Jr. SG	Recruit ratings: Scout: Rivals: (NR)				
Overall recruit ranking:
Note: In many cases, Scout, Rivals, 247Sports, On3, and ESPN may conflict in their listings of height and weight.; In these cases, the average was taken. ESPN grades are on a 100-point scale.; Sources: "2014 Team Ranking". Rivals.

=== Recruiting class of 2015 ===
College recruiting information
Name	Hometown	School	Height	Weight	Commit date
Don Coleman; PG	Augusta, Georgia	Butler High School	6 ft 0 in (1.83 m)	160 lb (73 kg)	Jun 22, 2014
Don Coleman; PG	Recruit ratings: Scout: Rivals: (NR)				
Nick Rutherford; PG	Allen, Texas	Allen High School	6 ft 2 in (1.88 m)	N/A	Aug 8, 2014
Nick Rutherford; PG	Recruit ratings: Scout: Rivals: (NR)				
Overall recruit ranking:
Note: In many cases, Scout, Rivals, 247Sports, On3, and ESPN may conflict in their listings of height and weight.; In these cases, the average was taken. ESPN grades are on a 100-point scale.; Sources: "2015 Team Ranking". Rivals.

== Roster ==
2014–15 Florida Atlantic Owls men's basketball team
Players
Coaches

Pos.	#	Name	Height	Weight	Year	Previous school	Hometown
C	0	C. J. Turman	6 ft 9 in (2.06 m)	250 lb (113 kg)	Fr	Morgan County	Madison, Georgia
G	1	D'Andre Johnson	6 ft 1 in (1.85 m)	185 lb (84 kg)	So	Cass Tech	Detroit, Michigan
G	2	Marquan Botley	5 ft 10 in (1.78 m)	160 lb (73 kg)	So	Prestonwood Christian	Plano, Texas
G	3	Adonis Filer (redshirt)	6 ft 3 in (1.91 m)	190 lb (86 kg)	Jr	Clemson	Chicago Heights, Illinois
G	4	Justin Massey	6 ft 3 in (1.91 m)	185 lb (84 kg)	Fr	American Heritage	Cooper City, Florida
F	5	Javier Lacunza	6 ft 9 in (2.06 m)	215 lb (98 kg)	Jr	Sagrado Corazon	Pamplona, Spain
C	11	Justin Raffington	6 ft 9 in (2.06 m)	255 lb (116 kg)	RS Sr	San Francisco	Freiburg, Germany
G	12	Jackson Trapp	6 ft 4 in (1.93 m)	200 lb (91 kg)	Jr	Fishburne Military School	Orlando, Florida
G	15	Maceo Baston	6 ft 5 in (1.96 m)	185 lb (84 kg)	Fr	Detroit Country Day	Detroit, Michigan
G	22	Malcolm Laws	6 ft 1 in (1.85 m)	195 lb (88 kg)	Fr	Lake Highland Prep	Orlando, Florida
G	23	Solomon Poole	6 ft 0 in (1.83 m)	185 lb (84 kg)	Jr	Georgia Tech	Jacksonville, Florida
F/C	24	Brian Hornstein	7 ft 0 in (2.13 m)	210 lb (95 kg)	Sr	Richland CC	Dallas, Texas
G	30	Anthony Graves	6 ft 2 in (1.88 m)	205 lb (93 kg)	Sr	Pembroke Pines Charter	Pembroke Pines, Florida
F	44	Kelvin Penn	6 ft 6 in (1.98 m)	233 lb (106 kg)	Sr	Massanutten Military Academy	Steilacoom, Washington
C	50	Grant Pelchen	6 ft 11 in (2.11 m)	235 lb (107 kg)	So	Jupiter HS	Jupiter, Florida

Head coach

- Michael Curry (Georgia Southern)

Assistant coach(es)

- Eric Snow (Michigan State)
- Robbie Laing (Troy)
- Charlemagne Gibbons (Auburn Montgomery)

Legend

- (C) Team captain
- (S) Suspended
- (I) Ineligible
- (W) Walk-on
- Injured
- Current redshirt

Roster

== Schedule ==
Date time, TV	Opponent	Result	Record	Site (attendance) city, state
Exhibition
11/08/2014*; 4:00 pm	St. Thomas	W 73–60		FAU Arena; Boca Raton, Florida
Regular season
11/14/2014*; 8:00 pm, ASN	at Elon	L 58–64	0–1	Alumni Gym (1,421); Elon, North Carolina
11/17/2014*; 7:00 pm	Warner	W 74–49	1–1	FAU Arena (1,317); Boca Raton, Florida
11/20/2014*; 8:00 pm, ASN	at Harvard	L 49–71	1–2	Lavietes Pavilion (1,343); Cambridge, Massachusetts
11/23/2014*; 5:00 pm, FSN	at Georgia	L 61–74	1–3	Stegeman Coliseum (4,735); Athens, Georgia
11/30/2014*; 2:00 pm	Ave Maria	W 54–43	2–3	FAU Arena (937); Boca Raton, Florida
12/03/2014*; 7:00 pm	East Carolina	W 72–63	3–3	FAU Arena (1,219); Boca Raton, Florida
12/13/2014*; 8:00 pm, ESPN3	at UCF	W 54–41	4–3	CFE Arena (6,180); Orlando, Florida
12/16/2014*; 7:00 pm	Stetson	W 79–69	5–3	FAU Arena (898); Boca Raton, Florida
12/20/2014*; 3:00 pm	at St. Francis Brooklyn	L 56–61	5–4	Generoso Pope Athletic Complex (503); Brooklyn, New York
12/22/2014*; 7:00 pm	Eastern Kentucky	W 69–66	6–4	FAU Arena (805); Boca Raton, Florida
12/30/2014*; 7:00 pm	at Jacksonville	W 68–50	7–4	Jacksonville Veterans Memorial Arena (579); Jacksonville, Florida
01/04/2015; 2:00 pm	FIU	L 60–62	7–5 (0–1)	FAU Arena (1,197); Boca Raton, Florida
01/08/2015; 8:00 pm	at UAB	L 57–66	7–6 (0–2)	Bartow Arena (2,385); Birmingham, Alabama
01/10/2015; 8:00 pm	at Middle Tennessee	L 58–82	7–7 (0–3)	Murphy Center (2,774); Murfreesboro, Tennessee
01/15/2015; 7:00 pm	WKU	L 85–88 ^{OT}	7–8 (0–4)	FAU Arena (1,491); Boca Raton, Florida
01/17/2015; 5:30 pm, ASN	Marshall	W 76–62	8–8 (1–4)	FAU Arena (1,167); Boca Raton, Florida
01/29/2015; 7:00 pm	at Charlotte	L 61–86	8–9 (1–5)	Dale F. Halton Arena (3,724); Charlotte, North Carolina
01/31/2015; 7:00 pm	at Old Dominion	L 57–68	8–10 (1–6)	Ted Constant Convocation Center (7,453); Norfolk, Virginia
02/03/2015; 7:30 pm	at FIU	L 56–64	8–11 (1–7)	FIU Arena (1,543); Miami, Florida
02/05/2015; 8:00 pm, ASN	UTEP	L 56–63	8–12 (1–8)	FAU Arena (1,566); Boca Raton, Florida
02/07/2015; 7:00 pm	UTSA	L 59–74	8–13 (1–9)	FAU Arena (1,175); Boca Raton, Florida
02/12/2015; 7:30 pm	at Louisiana Tech	L 54–65	8–14 (1–10)	Thomas Assembly Center (3,412); Ruston, Louisiana
02/14/2015; 8:00 pm	at Southern Miss	L 54–62	8–15 (1–11)	Reed Green Coliseum (2,872); Hattiesburg, Mississippi
02/19/2015; 7:00 pm	North Texas	L 72–79	8–16 (1–12)	FAU Arena (1,108); Boca Raton, Florida
02/21/2015; 7:00 pm	Rice	L 69–76	8–17 (1–13)	FAU Arena (1,481); Boca Raton, Florida
02/26/2015; 8:00 pm	at WKU	L 68–71	8–18 (1–14)	E. A. Diddle Arena (3,645); Bowling Green, Kentucky
02/28/2015; 7:00 pm	at Marshall	L 63–79	8–19 (1–15)	Cam Henderson Center (5,745); Huntington, West Virginia
03/05/2015; 7:00 pm	UAB	W 62–59	9–19 (2–15)	FAU Arena (1,005); Boca Raton, Florida
03/07/2015; 7:00 pm	Middle Tennessee	L 54–77	9–20 (2–16)	FAU Arena (1,021); Boca Raton, Florida
*Non-conference game. ^{#}Rankings from AP Poll. (#) Tournament seedings in parentheses. All times are in Eastern Time.
