= 2014–15 Southern Miss Golden Eagles basketball team =

American college basketball season

2014–15 Southern Miss Golden Eagles men's basketball
- Conference: Conference USA
- Record: 3–20, 6 wins vacated (3–14 C-USA, 1 win vacated)
- Head coach: Doc Sadler (1st season)
- Assistant coaches: Jeremy Cox; Jareem Dowling; Tom Schuberth
- Home arena: Reed Green Coliseum

2014–15 Conference USA men's basketball standings
| | Conf. | | | | Overall |
| Team | W | | L | PCT | W | | L | PCT |
|---|---|---|---|---|---|---|---|---|
| Louisiana Tech | 15 | – | 3 | .833 | 27 | – | 9 | .750 |
| Old Dominion | 13 | – | 5 | .722 | 27 | – | 8 | .771 |
| UTEP | 13 | – | 5 | .722 | 22 | – | 11 | .667 |
| WKU | 12 | – | 6 | .667 | 20 | – | 12 | .625 |
| UAB † | 12 | – | 6 | .667 | 20 | – | 16 | .556 |
| Middle Tennessee | 9 | – | 9 | .500 | 19 | – | 17 | .528 |
| FIU | 8 | – | 10 | .444 | 16 | – | 17 | .485 |
| UTSA | 8 | – | 10 | .444 | 14 | – | 16 | .467 |
| North Texas | 8 | – | 10 | .444 | 14 | – | 17 | .452 |
| Rice | 8 | – | 10 | .444 | 12 | – | 20 | .375 |
| Charlotte | 7 | – | 11 | .389 | 14 | – | 18 | .438 |
| Marshall | 7 | – | 11 | .389 | 11 | – | 21 | .344 |
| Southern Miss* | 4 | – | 14 | .222 | 9 | – | 20 | .310 |
| Florida Atlantic | 2 | – | 16 | .111 | 9 | – | 20 | .310 |
† 2015 C-USA Tournament winner *Ineligible for postseason play due to self-imposed postseason ban

The 2014–15 Southern Miss Golden Eagles men's basketball team represented the University of Southern Mississippi during the 2014–15 NCAA Division I men's basketball season. The Golden Eagles, led by first year head coach Doc Sadler, played their home games at Reed Green Coliseum and were members of Conference USA. They finished the season 9–20, 4–14 in C-USA play to finish in 13th place. Due to violations committed under the previous coaching regime, the team were ineligible for postseason play including the C-USA tournament.

In 2016, the NCAA vacated six wins due to participation of two ineligible players, who were suspended effective January 29, 2015.

== Previous season ==
The Golden Eagles finished the season 29–7, 13–3 in C-USA play to finish in a four-way tie for the C-USA regular season championship. They advanced to the semifinals of the C-USA tournament where they lost to Louisiana Tech. They were invited to the National Invitation Tournament where they defeated Toledo and Missouri to advance to the quarterfinals where they lost to Minnesota.

== Departures ==
| Name | Number | Pos. | Height | Weight | Year | Hometown | Notes |
|---|---|---|---|---|---|---|---|
| Neil Watson | 5 | G | 5'11" | 170 | Senior | Kansas City, MO | Graduated |
| Daveon Boardingham | 11 | F | 6'7" | 225 | Senior | Newark, NJ | Graduated |
| Aaron Brown | 22 | F | 6'5" | 210 | RS Junior | Hackensack, NJ | Graduate transfer to Boston College |
| Michael Craig | 24 | G/F | 6'5" | 230 | Senior | Phoenix, AZ | Graduated |
| Ude Ifeanyichukwa | 32 | F | 6'10" | 235 | Junior | Abuja, Nigeria | Transferred to Kentucky Wesleyan |

=== Incoming transfers ===
| Name | Number | Pos. | Height | Weight | Year | Hometown | Previous School |
|---|---|---|---|---|---|---|---|
| Dallas Anglin | 4 | G | 6'2" | 175 | Junior | Montclair, NJ | Junior college transfer from College of Southern Idaho. |
| Rasham Suarez | 11 | G | 6'2 | 185 | Junior | San Juan, PR | Junior college transfer from Central Florida Community College. |
| Khari Price | 12 | G | 5'11" | 170 | Junior | Slidell, LA | Transferred from Dayton. Under NCAA transfer rules, Price will have to redshirt from the 2014–15 season. Will have two years of remaining eligibility. |

== Recruiting class of 2014 ==
College recruiting information
| Name | Hometown | School | Height | Weight | Commit date |
|---|---|---|---|---|---|
| Kevin Holland; SG | Tuscaloosa, AL | Paul W. Bryant High School | 6 ft 1 in (1.85 m) | 162 lb (73 kg) | May 15, 2014 |
| Kevin Holland; SG | Recruit ratings: Scout: Rivals: (69) | | | | |
| Davaris McGowens; SF | Taylors, SC | Gray Military Academy | 6 ft 6 in (1.98 m) | 230 lb (100 kg) | May 15, 2014 |
| Davaris McGowens; SF | Recruit ratings: Scout: Rivals: (69) | | | | |
Overall recruit ranking:
Note: In many cases, Scout, Rivals, 247Sports, On3, and ESPN may conflict in their listings of height and weight.; In these cases, the average was taken. ESPN grades are on a 100-point scale.; Sources: "2014 Team Ranking". Rivals.

== Roster ==
2014–15 Southern Miss Golden Eagles men's basketball team
Players
Coaches

| Pos. | # | Name | Height | Weight | Year | Hometown |
|---|---|---|---|---|---|---|
| G | 0 | Shadell Millinghaus | 6 ft 0 in (1.83 m) | 194 lb (88 kg) | So | Brooklyn, NY |
| G/F | 2 | Matt Bingaya | 6 ft 5 in (1.96 m) | 200 lb (91 kg) | RS So | Delaware, OH |
| G/F | 3 | Davon Hayes | 6 ft 7 in (2.01 m) | 190 lb (86 kg) | RS Fr | Portsmouth, VA |
| G | 4 | Dallas Anglin | 6 ft 2 in (1.88 m) | 180 lb (82 kg) | Jr | Montclair, NJ |
| G | 10 | Keljin Blevins | 6 ft 4 in (1.93 m) | 200 lb (91 kg) | Fr | Hot Spring, AR |
| G | 11 | Rasham Suarez | 6 ft 3 in (1.91 m) | 205 lb (93 kg) | Jr | Jonesboro, GA |
| G | 12 | Khari Price (redshirt) | 5 ft 9 in (1.75 m) | 175 lb (79 kg) | Jr | Slidell, LA |
| G | 13 | Chip Armelin | 6 ft 4 in (1.93 m) | 207 lb (94 kg) | RS Sr | Sulphur, LA |
| F | 15 | Eddie Davis | 6 ft 7 in (2.01 m) | 248 lb (112 kg) | Fr | Las Vegas, NV |
| G | 20 | Kevin Holland | 6 ft 1 in (1.85 m) | 175 lb (79 kg) | Fr | Tuscaloosa, AL |
| F | 21 | Norville Carey | 6 ft 7 in (2.01 m) | 228 lb (103 kg) | Jr | British Virgin Islands |
| F | 25 | Jamie Champman | 6 ft 3 in (1.91 m) | 190 lb (86 kg) | Jr | Mobile, AL |
| F | 33 | Michael O'Donnell | 6 ft 6 in (1.98 m) | 188 lb (85 kg) | Jr | Chicago, IL |
| F | 34 | Jeremiah Eason | 6 ft 7 in (2.01 m) | 230 lb (104 kg) | Sr | Fort Lauderdale, FL |

Head coach

- Doc Sadler (Auburn)

Assistant coach(es)

- Jeremy Cox (Colorado Mesa)
- Jareem Dowling (Maryland Eastern Shore)
- Tom Schuberth (Mississippi State)

Legend

- (C) Team captain
- (S) Suspended
- (I) Ineligible
- (W) Walk-on
- Injured
- Current redshirt

Roster

== Schedule ==
| Date time, TV | Opponent | Result | Record | Site (attendance) city, state |
Exhibition
| 11/06/2014*; 7:00 pm | Mississippi College | W 77–68 | – | Reed Green Coliseum (2,784); Hattiesburg, MS |
Regular season
| 11/14/2014*; 7:00 pm | William Carey | W 86–63 | 1–0 | Reed Green Coliseum (3,594); Hattiesburg, MS |
| 11/17/2014*; 7:00 pm | South Alabama | W 68–59 | 2–0 | Reed Green Coliseum (3,023); Hattiesburg, MS |
| 11/20/2014*; 8:00 pm, SECN | at Alabama | L 67–81 | 2–1 | Coleman Coliseum (9,260); Tuscaloosa, AL |
| 11/25/2014*; 7:00 pm | Troy | W 72–70 | 3–1 | Reed Green Coliseum (3,202); Hattiesburg, MS |
| 11/30/2014*; 4:00 pm | at Drexel | L 36–59 | 3–2 | Daskalakis Athletic Center (1,092); Philadelphia, PA |
| 12/03/2014*; 7:30 pm | North Dakota State | W 78–65 | 4–2 | Reed Green Coliseum (3,083); Hattiesburg, MS |
| 12/06/2014*; 7:00 pm | Rhode Island | L 43–75 | 4–3 | Reed Green Coliseum (3,156); Hattiesburg, MS |
| 12/13/2014*; 7:00 pm | Spring Hill | W 66–56 | 5–3 | Reed Green Coliseum (3,254); Hattiesburg, MS |
| 12/18/2014*; 7:00 pm | at Jackson State | L 46–66 | 5–4 | Williams Assembly Center (839); Jackson, MS |
| 12/21/2014*; 1:00 pm | at Georgia State | L 55–68 | 5–5 | GSU Sports Arena (1,387); Atlanta, GA |
| 12/29/2014*; 6:00 pm, SECN | at LSU | L 67–87 | 5–6 | Maravich Center (9,089); Baton Rouge, LA |
| 01/03/2015; 7:00 pm | Louisiana Tech | L 70–83 | 5–7 (0–1) | Reed Green Coliseum (3,187); Hattiesburg, MS |
| 01/08/2015; 7:00 pm, ASN | at UTSA | L 57–77 | 5–8 (0–2) | Convocation Center (760); San Antonio, TX |
| 01/10/2015; 8:00 pm | at UTEP | L 40–74 | 5–9 (0–3) | Don Haskins Center (8,022); El Paso, TX |
| 01/15/2015; 7:00 pm | Middle Tennessee | L 61–62 | 5–10 (0–4) | Reed Green Coliseum (3,191); Hattiesburg, MS |
| 01/17/2015; 7:00 pm | UAB | L 56–63 | 5–11 (0–5) | Reed Green Coliseum (3,493); Hattiesburg, MS |
| 01/22/2015; 7:00 pm | at Rice | L 56–58 | 5–12 (0–6) | Tudor Fieldhouse (985); Houston, TX |
| 01/24/2015; 7:00 pm | at North Texas | W 75–71 ^{OT} | 6–12 (1–6) | The Super Pit (3,759); Denton, TX |
| 01/29/2015; 7:00 pm | Marshall | L 54–69 | 6–13 (1–7) | Reed Green Coliseum (3,392); Hattiesburg, MS |
| 01/31/2015; 7:00 pm | WKU | L 62–73 | 6–14 (1–8) | Reed Green Coliseum (3608); Hattiesburg, MS |
| 02/05/2015; 7:00 pm | at Middle Tennessee | L 51–61 | 6–15 (1–9) | Murphy Center (4,012); Murfreesboro, TN |
| 02/07/2015; 2:00 pm | at UAB | L 68–78 | 6–16 (1–10) | Bartow Arena (3,786); Birmingham, AL |
| 02/12/2015; 8:00 pm, FSN | FIU | L 71–73 ^{OT} | 6–17 (1–11) | Reed Green Coliseum (3,015); Hattiesburg, MS |
| 02/14/2015; 7:00 pm | Florida Atlantic | W 62–54 | 7–17 (2–11) | Reed Green Coliseum (2,872); Hattiesburg, MS |
| 02/19/2015; 4:30 pm, ASN | at Old Dominion | L 38–64 | 7–18 (2–12) | Ted Constant Convocation Center (6,177); Norfolk, VA |
| 02/21/2015; 4:30 pm, ASN | at Charlotte | L 43–71 | 7–19 (2–13) | Dale F. Halton Arena (5,469); Charlotte, NC |
| 02/26/2015; 7:00 pm | UTSA | W 70–66 | 8–19 (3–13) | Reed Green Coliseum (2,990); Hattiesburg, MS |
| 02/28/2015; 7:00 pm | UTEP | W 63–60 | 9–19 (4–13) | Reed Green Coliseum (4,778); Hattiesburg, MS |
| 03/05/2015; 7:00 pm, CBSSN | at Louisiana Tech | L 61–72 | 9–20 (4–14) | Thomas Assembly Center (5,805); Ruston, LA |
*Non-conference game. ^{#}Rankings from AP Poll. (#) Tournament seedings in parentheses. All times are in Central Time.
