= 2015 Conference USA men's basketball tournament =

- Classification: Division I
- Season: 2014–15
- Teams: 12
- Site: Legacy Arena; Birmingham, Alabama
- Champions: UAB (1st title)
- Winning coach: Jerod Haase (1st title)
- Television: ASN, CBSSN, FS1

2014–15 Conference USA men's basketball standings
	Conf.				Overall
Team	W		L	PCT	W		L	PCT
Louisiana Tech	15	–	3	.833	27	–	9	.750
Old Dominion	13	–	5	.722	27	–	8	.771
UTEP	13	–	5	.722	22	–	11	.667
WKU	12	–	6	.667	20	–	12	.625
UAB †	12	–	6	.667	20	–	16	.556
Middle Tennessee	9	–	9	.500	19	–	17	.528
FIU	8	–	10	.444	16	–	17	.485
UTSA	8	–	10	.444	14	–	16	.467
North Texas	8	–	10	.444	14	–	17	.452
Rice	8	–	10	.444	12	–	20	.375
Charlotte	7	–	11	.389	14	–	18	.438
Marshall	7	–	11	.389	11	–	21	.344
Southern Miss*	4	–	14	.222	9	–	20	.310
Florida Atlantic	2	–	16	.111	9	–	20	.310
† 2015 C-USA Tournament winner *Ineligible for postseason play due to self-imposed postseason ban

The 2015 Conference USA men's basketball tournament was the post-season men's basketball tournament for Conference USA, held March 11–14, 2015, in Birmingham, Alabama, at Legacy Arena. On January 21, 2015, Southern Miss self-imposed a postseason ban due to recruiting violations. Despite having 14 members, only 12, excluding Southern Miss, made the tournament

== Seeds ==
Seed	School	Conference	Overall	Tiebreaker
1	Louisiana Tech ‡#	15–3	24–7	
2	UTEP #	13–5	21–9	1–0 vs. ODU
3	Old Dominion #	13–5	24–6	0–1 vs. UTEP
4	UAB #	12–6	16–15	1–0 vs. WKU
5	WKU	12–6	19–11	0–1 vs. UAB
6	Middle Tennessee	9–9	16–15	
7	UTSA	8–10	14–15	3–2 vs. UNT, Rice, FIU; 2–0 vs. UNT
8	North Texas	8–10	14–16	3–2 vs. UTSA, Rice, FIU; 0–2 vs. UTSA
9	Rice	8–10	11–19	2–3 vs. UTSA, UNT, FIU
10	FIU	8-10	15–16	1–2 vs. UTSA, UNT, Rice
11	Charlotte	7–11	14–17	2–0 vs. Marshall
12	Marshall	7–11	11–20	0–2 vs. Charlotte
‡ – C–USA regular season champions, and tournament No. 1 seed. # – Received a single–bye in the conference tournament. Overall records include all games played in the C–USA Tournament.

== Schedule ==
Game	Time*	Matchup^{#}	Final Score	Television	Attendance
First round – Wednesday, March 11
1	12:00 pm	#7 UTSA vs #10 FIU	54-57	ASN	4,661
2	2:30 pm	#6 MTSU vs #11 Charlotte	63-60	ASN	4,661
3	6:00 pm	#5 WKU vs #12 Marshall	59-45	ASN	4,695
4	8:30 pm	#8 North Texas vs #9 Rice	54-82	ASN	4,695
Quarterfinals – Thursday, March 12
5	12:00 pm	#2 UTEP vs #10 FIU	83-71	ASN	4,339
6	2:30 pm	#3 Old Dominion vs #6 MTSU	52-59	ASN	4,339
7	6:00 pm	#4 UAB vs #5 WKU	53-52	ASN	6,922
8	8:30 pm	#1 Louisiana Tech vs #9 Rice	70-64	ASN	6,922
Semifinals – Friday, March 13
9	3:00 pm	#2 UTEP vs #6 MTSU	50-53	CBSSN	6,429
10	5:30 pm	#4 UAB vs #1 Louisiana Tech	72-62 (OT)	CBSSN	6,429
Championship – Saturday, March 14
11	2:30 pm	#6 Middle Tennessee State vs. #4 UAB	60-73	FS1	8,279
*Game times in CT. #-Rankings denote tournament seed

== Bracket ==
First round Wednesday, March 11; ASN
8	North Texas	54
9	Rice	82
5	WKU	59
12	Marshall	45
7	UTSA	54
10	FIU	57
6	Middle Tennessee	63
11	Charlotte	60

Quarterfinals; Thursday, March 12; ASN
1	Louisiana Tech	70
9	Rice	64
4	UAB	53
5	WKU	52
2	UTEP	83
10	FIU	71
3	Old Dominion	52
6	Middle Tennessee	59

Semifinals; Friday, March 13; CBSSN
1	Louisiana Tech	62
4	UAB	72
2	UTEP	50
6	Middle Tennessee	53

Championship Game; Saturday, March 14; FS1
4	UAB	73
6	Middle Tennessee	60

== Game statistics ==
=== First round ===
American Sports Network

March 11
12 p.m. CT

Boxscore

UTSA 54, FIU 57
Scoring by half: 26–25, 28–32
Pts: R. Bowie, 25; Rebs: J. Hill, 12; Asts: C. Wilson, 3	Pts: D. Mavin, 15; Rebs: D. Mavin, 9 Asts: D. Mavin, 5

Legacy Arena
Attendance: 4,661
Referees: Hal Lusk, Darron George, Terry Moore

American Sports Network

March 11
2:30 p.m. CT

Boxscore

Middle Tennessee 63, Charlotte 60
Scoring by half: 29–30, 34–30
Pts: P. Buford, 14; Rebs: R. Upshaw, 8 Asts: Tied, 3	Pts: T. Dorn, 17; Rebs: M. Thorne Jr., 10; Asts: P. Henry, 4

Legacy Arena
Attendance: 4,661
Referees: Ted Valentine, Rick Randall, Clyde Owens

American Sports Network

March 11
6 p.m. CT

Boxscore

Western Kentucky 59, Marshall 45
Scoring by half: 26–20, 33–25
Pts: C. Harrison-Docks, 18; Rebs: N. Snipes, 8 Asts: Tied, 3	Pts: J. Kambola, 12; Rebs: Tied, 9 Asts: T. Manning, 4

Legacy Arena
Attendance: 4,695
Referees: Rick Hartzell, Kevin Mathis, John Hampton

American Sports Network

March 11
8:30 p.m. CT

Boxscore

North Texas 54, Rice 82
Scoring by half: 30–38, 24–44
Pts: J. Combs, 16; Rebs: J. Combs, 15; Asts: T. Taylor, 3	Pts: M. Jackson, 28; Rebs: S. Gearhart, 9 Asts: M. Guercy, 7

Legacy Arena
Attendance: 4,695
Referees: Steve Olson, Kelly Self, Andrew Walton

=== Quarterfinals ===
American Sports Network

March 12
12 p.m. CT

Boxscore

UTEP 83, FIU 71
Scoring by half: 47-33, 36-38
Pts: J. Washburn, 19; Rebs: C. Lang, 8 Asts: C. Lang, 4	Pts: D. Mavin, 23; Rebs: D. Draper, 6 Asts: Tied, 3

Legacy Arena
Attendance: 4,339
Referees: Rick Hartzell, Terry Davis, Rod Dixon

American Sports Network

March 12
2:30 p.m. CT

Boxscore

Old Dominion 52, Middle Tennessee 59
Scoring by half: 20-25, 32-34
Pts: T. Freeman, 22; Rebs: Tied, 7 Asts: T. Freeman, 4	Pts: P. Buford, 17; Rebs: R. Upshaw, 9 Asts: J. Raymond, 4

Legacy Arena
Attendance: 4,339
Referees: Hal Lusk, Darron George, Jeb Hartness

American Sports Network

March 12
6 p.m. CT

Boxscore

UAB 53, Western Kentucky 52
Scoring by half: 26-26, 27-26
Pts: N. Norton, 11; Rebs: T. Mehinti, 6 Asts: Tied, 4	Pts: G. Fant, 18; Rebs: G. Fant, 8 Asts: T. Price, 9

Legacy Arena
Attendance: 6,922
Referees: Steve Olson, Rick Randall, Bret Smith

American Sports Network

March 12
8:30 p.m. CT

Boxscore

Louisiana Tech 70, Rice 64
Scoring by half: 35-25, 39-35
Pts: E. McCree, 17; Rebs: E. McCree, 12; Asts: K. Smith, 6	Pts: S. Gearhart, 16; Rebs: V. Green, 7 Asts: Tied, 2

Legacy Arena
Attendance: 6,922
Referees: Kelly Self, Terry Moore, Kevin Mathis

=== Semifinals ===
CBS Sports Network

March 13
3 p.m. CT

Boxscore

UTEP 50, Middle Tennessee 53
Scoring by half: 25-20, 25-33
Pts: C. Lang, 14; Rebs: V. Hunter, 14; Asts: V. Hunter, 6	Pts: D. Jones, 17; Rebs: D. Harris, 8 Asts: Tied, 2

Legacy Arena
Attendance: 6,429
Referees: Steve Olson, Hal Lusk, Rick Randall

CBS Sports Network

March 13
5:30 p.m. CT

Boxscore

Louisiana Tech 62, UAB 72 (OT)
Scoring by half: 26-36, 32-22 Overtime: 4-14
Pts: K. Smith, 13; Rebs: X. Stapleton, 6 Asts: R. Appleby, 3	Pts: R. Brown, 14; Rebs: T. Mehinti, 10; Asts: R. Brown, 5

Legacy Arena
Attendance: 6,429
Referees: Darron George, Kelly Self, Jeb Hartness

=== Championship ===
Fox Sports 1

March 14
3 p.m. CT

Boxscore

UAB 73, Middle Tennessee 60
Scoring by half: 37-26, 36-34
Pts: R. Brown, 22; Rebs: Tied, 6 Asts: N. Norton, 6	Pts: J. Raymond, 12; Rebs: Tied, 5 Asts: Tied, 3

Legacy Arena
Attendance: 8,279
Referees: Steve Olson, Hal Lusk, Rick Randall

== See also ==
- 2015 Conference USA women's basketball tournament
