= 2014–15 FIU Panthers men's basketball team =

American college basketball season

2014–15 FIU Panthers men's basketball
- Conference: Conference USA
- Record: 16–17 (8–10 C-USA)
- Head coach: Anthony Evans (2nd season)
- Assistant coaches: Mike Gillian; Stephen Ott; Louis Rowe
- Home arena: FIU Arena

2014–15 Conference USA men's basketball standings
	Conf.				Overall
Team	W		L	PCT	W		L	PCT
Louisiana Tech	15	–	3	.833	27	–	9	.750
Old Dominion	13	–	5	.722	27	–	8	.771
UTEP	13	–	5	.722	22	–	11	.667
WKU	12	–	6	.667	20	–	12	.625
UAB †	12	–	6	.667	20	–	16	.556
Middle Tennessee	9	–	9	.500	19	–	17	.528
FIU	8	–	10	.444	16	–	17	.485
UTSA	8	–	10	.444	14	–	16	.467
North Texas	8	–	10	.444	14	–	17	.452
Rice	8	–	10	.444	12	–	20	.375
Charlotte	7	–	11	.389	14	–	18	.438
Marshall	7	–	11	.389	11	–	21	.344
Southern Miss*	4	–	14	.222	9	–	20	.310
Florida Atlantic	2	–	16	.111	9	–	20	.310
† 2015 C-USA Tournament winner *Ineligible for postseason play due to self-imposed postseason ban

The 2014–15 FIU Panthers men's basketball team represented Florida International University during the 2014–15 NCAA Division I men's basketball season. The Panthers, led by second year head coach Anthony Evans, played their home games at FIU Arena, and were members of Conference USA. They finished the season 16–17, 8–10 in C-USA play in a 4-way tie for seventh place. They advanced to the quarterfinals of the C-USA tournament where they lost to UTEP.

== Previous season ==
The Panthers finished the season 15–16, 7–9 in C-USA play to finish in a three-way tie for eighth place. Due to APR penalties, they were ineligible for a post-season berth, including the 2014 Conference USA men's basketball tournament.

== Departures ==
Name	Number	Pos.	Height	Weight	Year	Hometown	Notes
Raymond Taylor	2	G	5'6"	145	RS Senior	Miami, FL	Graduated
Jerome Frink	3	F	6'6"	220	Sophomore	Jersey City, NJ	Transferred
Dee Lewis	5	G	6'3"	195	RS Freshman	Ocala, FL	Left the team
Tymell Murphy	15	F	6'5"	210	Senior	Brooklyn, NY	Graduated
Rakeen Buckles	21	F	6'7"	215	RS Senior	Miami, FL	Graduated
Ivan Jurkovic	25	C	7'0"	245	Senior	Zagreb, Croatia	Graduated
Adriel Jimenez	32	G	6'2"	185	Sophomore	Miami, FL	Left the team
George Naldjieff	33	F	6'6"	225	Senior	Miami, FL	Graduated
Joey De La Rosa	34	C	6'11"	240	Junior	Bronx, NY	Left the team

=== Incoming transfers ===
Name	Number	Pos.	Height	Weight	Year	Hometown	Previous School
Michael Phillip	32	C	6'9"	200	Junior	Bronx, NY	Junior college transfer from Monroe College

== Recruiting class of 2014 ==
College recruiting information
Name	Hometown	School	Height	Weight	Commit date
Hassan Hussein; PF	Lorton, VA	Mount Zion Baptist Christian School	6 ft 9 in (2.06 m)	200 lb (91 kg)	N/A
Hassan Hussein; PF	Recruit ratings: Scout: Rivals: (70)				
Larry Dennis; PF	Wichita, KS	Sunrise Christian Academy	6 ft 8 in (2.03 m)	195 lb (88 kg)	Feb 13, 2014
Larry Dennis; PF	Recruit ratings: Scout: Rivals: (69)				
Elliott Smith; SF	Oakley, CA	Freedom High School	6 ft 5 in (1.96 m)	185 lb (84 kg)	May 19, 2014
Elliott Smith; SF	Recruit ratings: Scout: Rivals: (63)				
Overall recruit ranking:
Note: In many cases, Scout, Rivals, 247Sports, On3, and ESPN may conflict in their listings of height and weight.; In these cases, the average was taken. ESPN grades are on a 100-point scale.; Sources: "2014 Team Ranking". Rivals.

== Roster ==
2014–15 FIU Panthers men's basketball team
Players
Coaches

Pos.	#	Name	Height	Weight	Year	Previous school	Hometown
G	1	Anthony Boswell	6 ft 6 in (1.98 m)	205 lb (93 kg)	So	Patrick School	Bronx, NY
G	3	Tashwan Desir	5 ft 10 in (1.78 m)	178 lb (81 kg)	Jr	NIA Prep; Monroe CC	Brooklyn, NY
G	4	Cody Mann	6 ft 0 in (1.83 m)	160 lb (73 kg)	RS Jr	Dr. Krop; Colorado State	Miami, FL
G	5	Julian Gualtieri	6 ft 3 in (1.91 m)	180 lb (82 kg)	Fr	Miami	San Marino, San Marino
F	10	Hassan Hussein	6 ft 9 in (2.06 m)	205 lb (93 kg)	Fr	Mt. Zion Prep	Lorton, VA
G	11	Ray Rodriquez	6 ft 1 in (1.85 m)	180 lb (82 kg)	Jr	Hialeah Gardens; North Florida	Miami, FL
G	12	Dominique Williams	6 ft 7 in (2.01 m)	205 lb (93 kg)	So	Believe Prep	Washington, D.C.
F	14	Jonas Page	6 ft 7 in (2.01 m)	185 lb (84 kg)	So	Susquehanna Township	Harrisburg, PA
F	20	Adrian Diaz	6 ft 10 in (2.08 m)	230 lb (104 kg)	RS Jr	Hialeah-Miami Lakes; Kansas State	Miami, FL
F	21	Larry Dennis	6 ft 9 in (2.06 m)	205 lb (93 kg)	Fr	Sunrise Christian Academy	Wichita, KS
G	22	Dennis Marvin	6 ft 3 in (1.91 m)	183 lb (83 kg)	RS Sr	The Rock School; Florida Atlantic	Gainesville, FL
G	23	Marco Porcher Jimenez	6 ft 4 in (1.93 m)	185 lb (84 kg)	Sr	Oak Hill Academy; Fairleigh Dickinson	Málaga, Spain
F	32	Daviyon Draper	6 ft 7 in (2.01 m)	217 lb (98 kg)	Jr	Locke; Antelope Valley College	Los Angeles, CA
C	33	Michael Phillip	6 ft 9 in (2.06 m)	200 lb (91 kg)	Jr	George Westinghouse; Monroe CC	Brooklyn, NY
G/F	45	Kris Gulley	6 ft 7 in (2.01 m)	195 lb (88 kg)	Sr	James Madison; Long Beach State	Dallas, TX

Head coach

- Anthony Evans (St. Thomas Aquinas)

Assistant coach(es)

- Mike Gillian (Adams State)
- Stephen Ott (SUNY New Paltz)
- Louis Rowe (James Madison)

Legend

- (C) Team captain
- (S) Suspended
- (I) Ineligible
- (W) Walk-on
- Injured
- Current redshirt

Roster

== Schedule ==
Date time, TV	Rank^{#}	Opponent^{#}	Result	Record	Site (attendance) city, state
Regular season
11/14/2014*; 7:30 pm		Florida College	W 64–42	1–0	FIU Arena (1,391); Miami, FL
11/18/2014*; 7:00 pm		at Stetson	W 53–52	2–0	Edmunds Center (1,032); DeLand, FL
11/21/2014*; 7:30 pm		Florida Memorial	W 74–48	3–0	FIU Arena (1,394); Miami, FL
11/24/2014*; 7:00 pm		at Georgia Southern	L 72–78	3–1	Hanner Fieldhouse (728); Statesboro, GA
11/27/2014*; 3:30 pm, ESPN3		at USC Upstate; USC Upstate Tournament	L 53–68	3–2	Hodge Center (488); Spartanburg, SC
11/28/2014*; 3:30 pm, ESPN3		vs. Wright State; USC Upstate Tournament	W 61–59	4–2	Hodge Center (374); Spartanburg, SC
11/29/2014*; 3:30 pm, ESPN3		vs. Cal State Fullerton; USC Upstate Tournament	L 61–64	4–3	Hodge Center (314); Spartanburg, SC
12/02/2014*; 7:30 pm		Kennesaw State	W 59–38	5–3	FIU Arena (1,042); Miami, FL
12/05/2014*; 7:00 pm, ESPN3		at No. 5 Louisville	L 57–82	5–4	KFC Yum! Center (20,541); Louisville, KY
12/14/2014*; 2:00 pm, ESPN3		at Florida Gulf Coast	W 69–63	6–4	Alico Arena (3,511); Fort Myers, FL
12/18/2014*; 7:00 pm		at LIU Brooklyn	L 58–69	6–5	Steinberg Wellness Center (1,078); Brooklyn, NY
12/21/2014*; 2:30 pm		at Hartford	L 69–82	6–6	Chase Arena (2,310); Hartford, CT
12/29/2014*; 7:00 pm		at Florida A&M	W 76–55	7–6	Teaching Gym (279); Tallahassee, FL
01/04/2015; 2:00 pm		at Florida Atlantic	W 62–60	8–6 (1–0)	FAU Arena (1,197); Boca Raton, FL
01/08/2015; 8:00 pm		at Middle Tennessee	L 52–65	8–7 (1–1)	Murphy Center (2,587); Murfreesboro, TN
01/10/2015; 3:00 pm		at UAB	L 53–70	8–8 (1–2)	Bartow Arena (2,806); Birmingham, AL
01/15/2015; 7:30 pm		Marshall	W 66–62 ^{OT}	9–8 (2–2)	FIU Arena (N/A); Miami, FL
01/17/2015; 6:00 pm		WKU	L 58–65	9–9 (2–3)	FIU Arena (1,370); Miami, FL
01/29/2015; 7:00 pm		at Old Dominion	L 56–71	9–10 (2–4)	Ted Constant Convocation Center (6,489); Norfolk, VA
01/31/2015; 7:00 pm		at Charlotte	W 78–70	10–10 (3–4)	Dale F. Halton Arena (4,021); Charlotte, NC
02/03/2015; 7:30 pm		Florida Atlantic	W 64–56	11–10 (4–4)	FIU Arena (1,543); Miami, FL
02/05/2015; 7:30 pm		UTSA	L 63–74	11–11 (4–5)	FIU Arena (919); Miami, FL
02/07/2015; 5:30 pm, ASN		UTEP	L 64–67	11–12 (4–6)	FIU Arena (1,312); Miami, FL
02/12/2015; 9:00 pm, FSN		at Southern Miss	W 73–71 ^{OT}	12–12 (5–6)	Reed Green Coliseum (3,015); Hattiesburg, MS
02/14/2015; 7:00 pm		at Louisiana Tech	L 42–75	12–13 (5–7)	Thomas Assembly Center (3,314); Ruston, LA
02/19/2015; 8:00 pm, ASN		at Rice	W 60–56	13–13 (6–7)	Tudor Fieldhouse (1,051); Houston, TX
02/21/2015; 6:00 pm		at North Texas	L 56–70	13–14 (6–8)	The Super Pit (1,408); Denton, TX
02/26/2015; 8:00 pm, ASN		at Marshall	L 69–87	13–15 (6–9)	Cam Henderson Center (4,886); Huntington, WV
02/28/2015; 8:00 pm		at WKU	L 61–77	13–16 (6–10)	E. A. Diddle Arena (7,119); Bowling Green, KY
03/05/2015; 7:30 pm		Middle Tennessee	W 59–54	14–16 (7–10)	FIU Arena (1,041); Miami, FL
03/07/2015; 8:00 pm, ASN		UAB	W 70–66	15–16 (8–10)	FIU Arena (951); Miami, FL
Conference USA tournament
03/11/2015; 11:00 am, ASN		vs. UTSA; First round	W 57–54	16–16	Birmingham–Jefferson Convention Complex; Birmingham, AL
03/12/2015; 1:00 pm, ASN		vs. UTEP; Quarterfinal	L 71–83	16–17	Birmingham–Jefferson Convention Complex; Birmingham, AL
*Non-conference game. ^{#}Rankings from AP Poll. (#) Tournament seedings in parentheses. All times are in Eastern Time.
