= Raheem Appleby =

American basketball player (born 1993)

No. 3 – USK Praha
- Position: Point guard / shooting guard
- League: NBL

Personal information
- Born: May 16, 1993 (age 33) Wichita Falls, Texas
- Listed height: 6 ft 2.75 in (1.90 m)
- Listed weight: 169 lb (77 kg)

Career information
- High school: Jacksonville (Jacksonville, Arkansas)
- College: Louisiana Tech (2011–2015)
- NBA draft: 2015: undrafted
- Playing career: 2015–present

Career history
- 2015–2016: Apollon Limassol
- 2016–2017: Kouvot
- 2018–present: USK Praha

Career highlights
- Cypriot League All-Star (2015); Second-team All-Conference USA (2015); First-team All-WAC (2013); Second-team All-WAC (2012); WAC Freshman of the Year (2012)

Raheem Jamaal Appleby (born May 16, 1993) is an American basketball player for USK Praha of the NBL.

== High school career ==
Appleby played high school basketball at Jacksonville, where he was coached by Victory Joyner, Terry Wilson and Roy Jackson. He was named all-conference and to all-state team two years. As a senior, he averaged 26 points, 3 assist and 3 rebounds per game.

== College career ==
As a freshman, Appleby played 32 games and won the Freshman of the Year award at Western Athletic Conference after producing 13.9 points and 2.4 rebounds per game. As a sophomore Appleby played in 34 contests, and improved his numbers, averaging 14.9 points, 2.7 rebounds and 1.2 assists per game. During the next two years, his number were also impressing and as a senior, he went on to average 14.9 points, 2.7 rebounds and 2 assists per game.

== Professional career ==
After going undrafted in the 2015 NBA draft, Appleby joined PVSK Panthers of the Hungarian League but left the team after one month. On October, he left the team and moved to Apollon Limassol of the Cypriot League.

On June 6, 2016, he joined Kouvot of the Finish League .

On July 17, 2017, Appleby joined Aries Trikala of the Greek Basket League, but he left the team without appearing in a single game.
