= T. J. Price =

American basketball player (born 1993)

Personal information
- Born: June 16, 1993 (age 33) Slidell, Louisiana, U.S.
- Listed height: 6 ft 5 in (1.96 m)
- Listed weight: 220 lb (100 kg)

Career information
- High school: Salmen (Slidell, Louisiana)
- College: Western Kentucky (2011–2015)
- NBA draft: 2015: undrafted
- Playing career: 2015–2023
- Position: Shooting guard

Career history
- 2015–2016: Lille Métropole BC
- 2016–2018: Erie BayHawks / Lakeland Magic
- 2018–2019: Egis Körmend
- 2019: Hong Kong Eastern
- 2019–2020: Szolnoki Olajbányász KK
- 2020–2021: CS Dinamo București
- 2021–2022: Kaposvári
- 2022–2023: Quimper

Career highlights
- First-team All-Conference USA (2015); Second-team All-Sun Belt (2014); Sun Belt Conference Tournament Most Outstanding Player (2013); Second-team All-Sun Belt (2013)

Timothy Terell Price (born June 16, 1993) is an American former professional basketball player. He played college basketball for Western Kentucky.

== College career ==
Price was recruited to play linebacker at Louisiana Tech but instead chose to play basketball for Western Kentucky. He scored 21 points against eventual national champion Kentucky in the 2012 NCAA tournament. As a freshman, Price posted 9.0 points and 4.3 rebounds per game for the Hilltoppers in 2011–12. He led the team in scoring as a sophomore with 15.2 points per game.

In January 2014, Price missed a game because of a violation of undisclosed team rules. As a junior at Western Kentucky, Price averaged 15.4 points, 4.4 rebounds and 2.0 assists per game and led the Hilltoppers to a second-place finish in the Sun Belt conference. He missed the regular season finale versus Georgia State due to a shoulder injury. Price was named to the Second-team All-Sun Belt. He earned Conference USA Player of the Week after scoring 26 points, pulling down 10 rebounds and posting five assists in the Hilltoppers' 81–74 victory against Ole Miss in January. As a senior, he led Conference USA with 17.1 points per game to go with 5.3 rebounds and 4.0 assists per game. Price was named to the First Team All-Conference USA and finished his college career as Western Kentucky's all-time leader in three-pointers with 286. His 1,782 career points rank sixth all time at the university. Following the season Price participated in the Portsmouth Invitational Tournament, where he averaged 9.7 points and 2.7 assists per game in three contests.

== Professional career ==
After not being chosen in the 2015 NBA draft, he was invited by the Chicago Bulls to participate in the NBA Summer League, where he played four games, in which he averaged 2.2 points per game. He was subsequently signed by the Lille Métropole BC of the French Pro B, where he played a season in which he averaged 15.4 points, 2.4 assists, and 2.6 rebounds per game. He returned to America to play again the 2016 summer leagues, this time with the Orlando Magic. Price was drafted 17th overall in the D-League draft and signed a contract with the Erie BayHawks. In his first season Price was a starter and averaged 14.4 points and 3.1 rebounds per game. He continued in the team the following season with the new name of Lakeland Magic.

On July 27, 2018, Price signed with Egis Körmend. He signed with Hong Kong Eastern on September 14, 2019, turning down several offers in Europe. Price played two games in Hong Kong and averaged 20 points and 6.5 rebounds per game. On December 23, he signed with Szolnoki Olajbányász KK. Price averaged 9.6 points, 3.7 rebounds, and 2.9 assists per game. On September 7, 2020, he signed with CS Dinamo București of the Liga Națională.
