= UAB Blazers men's basketball statistical leaders =

The UAB Blazers men's basketball statistical leaders are individual statistical leaders of the UAB Blazers men's basketball program in various categories, including points, assists, blocks, rebounds, and steals. Within those areas, the lists identify single-game, single-season, and career leaders. The Blazers represent the University of Alabama at Birmingham in the NCAA's American Athletic Conference.

UAB began competing in intercollegiate basketball in 1978. The NCAA did not officially record assists as a stat until the 1983–84 season, and blocks and steals until the 1985–86 season, but UAB's record books includes players in these stats before these seasons. These lists are updated through the end of the 2020–21 season.

== Scoring ==
Career
Rk	Player	Points	Seasons
1	Steve Mitchell	1,866	1982–83 1983–84 1984–85 1985–86
2	Andy Kennedy	1,787	1988–89 1989–90 1990–91
3	Chris Cokley	1,660	2014–15 2015–16 2016–17 2017–18
4	Elbert Rogers	1,587	1988–89 1989–90 1990–91 1991–92
5	Oliver Robinson	1,577	1978–79 1979–80 1980–81 1981–82
6	Mo Finley	1,539	1999–00 2001–02 2002–03 2003–04
7	Stanley Jackson	1,491	1989–90 1990–91 1991–92 1992–93
8	Carlos Williams	1,474	1994–95 1995–96 1996–97
9	Jerome Mincy	1,473	1982–83 1983–84 1984–85 1985–86
10	Jordan Walker	1,426	2021-22 2022-23

Season
Rk	Player	Points	Season
1	Jordan Walker	736	2022-23
2	Robert Vaden	695	2007–08
3	Jordan Walker	690	2021-22
4	Andy Kennedy	676	1990-91
5	Reginald Turner	662	1988–89
6	Oliver Robinson	655	1981–82
7	Yaxel Lendeborg	654	2024–25
8	Carlos Williams	629	1996–97
9	Mo Finley	623	2002–03
10	Steve Mitchell	616	1984–85

Single game
Rk	Player	Points	Season	Opponent
1	Jordan Walker	42	2021-22	Middle Tennessee State
2	Jordan Walker	41	2022-23	Charlotte
	Robert Vaden	41	2007–08	UTEP
	Andy Kennedy	41	1990–91	Saint Louis
5	Jordan Walker	40	2021-22	Middle Tennessee State
6	Aaron Johnson	39	2010–11	East Carolina
	Marvett McDonald	39	2005–06	SMU
8	Mo Finley	38	2003–04	Mississippi State
	Jordan Walker	38	2022-23	Alabama State
10	Jamarr Sanders	37	2010–11	Rice

== Rebounds ==
Career
Rk	Player	Rebounds	Seasons
1	Jerome Mincy	933	1982–83 1983–84 1984–85 1985–86
2	Chris Cokley	857	2014–15 2015–16 2016–17 2017–18
3	William Lee	845	2014–15 2015–16 2016–17 2017–18
4	Lawrence Kinnard	806	2005–06 2006–07 2007–08 2008–09
5	Yaxel Lendeborg	790	2023–24 2024–25
6	Trey Jemison	782	2020–21 2021–22 2022–23
7	Cameron Moore	747	2008–09 2009–10 2010–11 2011–12
8	Anthony Gordon	746	1982–83 1983–84 1984–85 1985–86
9	Carlos Williams	669	1994–95 1995–96 1996–97
10	Stanley Jackson	624	1989–90 1990–91 1991–92 1992–93

Season
Rk	Player	Rebounds	Season
1	Yaxel Lendeborg	420	2024–25
2	Yaxel Lendeborg	370	2023–24
3	Trey Jemison	329	2022–23
4	Cameron Moore	325	2011–12
5	Elijah Millsap	324	2009–10
6	Carlos Williams	318	1996–97
7	Lawrence Kinnard	312	2008–09
8	Jerome Mincy	302	1985–86
9	Jerome Mincy	290	1984–85
10	Evan Chatman	281	2025–26

Single game
Rk	Player	Rebounds	Season	Opponent
1	Cameron Moore	24	2011–12	George Wash.
2	P.J. Arnold	22	2001–02	Eastern Michigan
3	Yaxel Lendeborg	21	2023–24	Florida Atlantic
4	Yaxel Lendeborg	20	2024–25	East Carolina
	Rod Rucker	20	2013–14	New Mexico
	Will Campbell	20	2000–01	Houston
	Carlos Williams	20	1996–97	Grambling
8	Will Campbell	19	2001–02	TCU
	Yaxel Lendeborg	19	2024–25	South Florida
10	Chris Giles	18	1981–82	Georgia
	Dylan Howard	18	1986–87	SC State
	Yaxel Lendeborg	18	2023–24	Tulane

== Assists ==
Career
Rk	Player	Assists	Seasons
1	Aaron Johnson	664	2007–08 2008–09 2009–10 2010–11
2	Steve Mitchell	597	1982–83 1983–84 1984–85 1985–86
3	Jack Kramer	586	1988–89 1989–90 1990–91
4	Barry Bearden	530	1986–87 1987–88 1988–89 1989–90
5	Squeaky Johnson	482	2003–04 2004–05 2005–06
6	Nick Norton	455	2014–15 2015–16 2016–17 2017–18
7	Corey Jackson	423	1991–92 1992–93 1993–94
8	LeAndrew Bass	421	1997–98 1998–99 1999–00 2000–01
9	Michael Charles	403	1984–85 1985–86 1986–87 1987–88
10	Paul Delaney III	364	2004–05 2005–06 2006–07 2007–08 2008–09

Season
Rk	Player	Assists	Season
1	Aaron Johnson	239	2010–11
2	Jack Kramer	209	1990–91
3	Jack Kramer	199	1988–89
4	Squeaky Johnson	194	2005–06
5	Eric Gaines	191	2023-24
6	Steve Mitchell	184	1985–86
7	Jack Kramer	178	1989–90
8	Barry Bearden	177	1988–89
	Chance Westry	177	2025–26
10	Barry Bearden	171	1987–88

Single game
Rk	Player	Assists	Season	Opponent
1	Chance Westry	15	2025–26	Charlotte
2	Aaron Johnson	14	2010–11	Southern Miss
	Aaron Johnson	14	2010–11	UTEP
	Jack Kramer	14	1990–91	Alabama State
5	LeAndrew Bass	13	2000–01	Tulane
	Barry Bearden	13	1988–89	Auburn
7	Paul Delaney III	12	2006–07	Winston Salem
	Steve Mitchell	12	1983–84	Old Dominion
	Paul Delaney III	12	2008–09	Tulane
	Jordan Walker	12	2021–22	Rice

== Steals ==
Career
Rk	Player	Steals	Seasons
1	Stanley Jackson	237	1989–90 1990–91 1991–92 1992–93
2	Squeaky Johnson	224	2003–04 2004–05 2005–06
3	Paul Delaney III	205	2004–05 2005–06 2006–07 2007–08 2008–09
4	Steve Mitchell	190	1982–83 1983–84 1984–85 1985–86
5	Mo Finley	180	1999–00 2001–02 2002–03 2003–04
	Damon Cobb	180	1995–96 1996–97 1997–98 1998–99
7	Oliver Robinson	176	1978–79 1979–80 1980–81 1981–82
8	Michael Charles	175	1984–85 1985–86 1986–87 1987–88
9	George Wilkerson	172	1989–90 1990–91 1991–92 1992–93 1993–94
10	Aaron Johnson	170	2007–08 2008–09 2009–10 2010–11

Season
Rk	Player	Steals	Season
1	Eric Bush	105	2002–03
2	Stanley Jackson	83	1992–93
3	Eric Gaines	82	2023-24
4	Squeaky Johnson	80	2005–06
	Quan Jackson	80	2021–22
6	Damon Cobb	76	1998–99
7	Squeaky Johnson	73	2004–05
8	Steve Mitchell	72	1984–85
	Eric Gaines	72	2022-23
10	Squeaky Johnson	71	2003–04

Single game
Rk	Player	Steals	Season	Opponent
1	Squeaky Johnson	12	2005–06	SC State
2	Damon Cobb	9	1998–99	Tulsa
3	Eric Bush	8	2002–03	Texas A&M-CC
	Stanley Jackson	8	1992–93	Nicholls State

== Blocks ==
Career
Rk	Player	Blocks	Seasons
1	William Lee	294	2014–15 2015–16 2016–17 2017–18
2	Alan Ogg	266	1986–87 1987–88 1988–89 1989–90
3	Trey Jemison	179	2020–21 2021–22 2022–23
4	Yaxel Lendeborg	138	2023–24 2024–25
5	Cameron Moore	137	2008–09 2009–10 2010–11 2011–12
6	Tosin Mehinti	134	2013–14 2014–15 2015–16 2016–17
7	Jerome Mincy	131	1982–83 1983–84 1984–85 1985–86
8	Norman Anchrum	125	1980–81 1981–82
9	Lawrence Kinnard	100	2005–06 2006–07 2007–08 2008–09
10	Anthony Gordon	93	1982–83 1983–84 1984–85 1985–86

Season
Rk	Player	Blocks	Season
1	Alan Ogg	129	1988–89
2	William Lee	95	2015–16
3	Alan Ogg	91	1989–90
4	William Lee	80	2016–17
5	Norman Anchrum	74	1981–82
6	Cameron Moore	73	2011–12
7	Yaxel Lendeborg	72	2023–24
8	William Lee	68	2017–18
	Tosin Mehinti	68	2014–15
10	Trey Jemison	67	2022–23

Single game
Rk	Player	Blocks	Season	Opponent
1	Alan Ogg	12	1988–89	Florida A&M
2	Jerome Mincy	10	1983–84	St. Mary's (Minn.)
3	William Lee	8	2015–16	Florida Atlantic
	William Lee	8	2014–15	Middle Tennessee
	Alan Ogg	8	1988–89	Long Beach State
	Alan Ogg	8	1989–90	VCU
