= Andy Kennedy =

American basketball coach (born 1968)

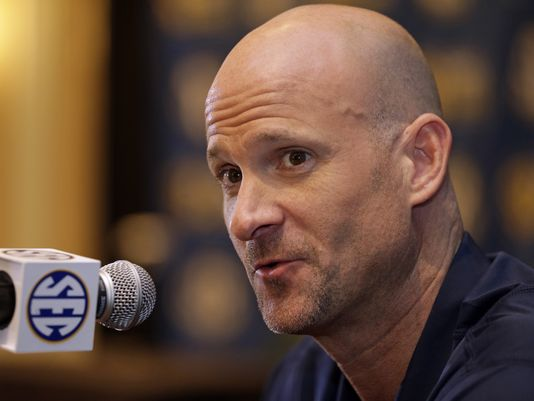

Current position
- Title: Head coach
- Team: UAB
- Conference: American
- Record: 149–64 (.700)

Biographical details
- Born: March 13, 1968 (age 58); Louisville, Mississippi, U.S.

Playing career
- 1986–1987: NC State
- 1988–1991: UAB
- 1992–1993: Valencia

Coaching career (HC unless noted)
- 1994–1995: South Alabama (assistant)
- 1996–2001: UAB (assistant)
- 2001–2005: Cincinnati (assistant)
- 2005–2006: Cincinnati (interim HC)
- 2006–2018: Ole Miss
- 2020–present: UAB

Administrative career (AD unless noted)
- 2026–Present: UAB (interim AD)

Head coaching record
- Overall: 415–233 (.640)
- Tournaments: 2–4 (NCAA Division I); 17–9 (NIT)

Accomplishments and honors

Championships
- SEC tournament (2013); C-USA tournament (2022); AAC tournament (2024)

Awards
- Fourth-team Parade All-American (1986); NY Post Big East Coach of the Year (2006); SEC Coach of the Year (2007); NBC Sports SEC Coach of the Year (2013); UAB Sports HOF (2022)

Andy Kennedy (born March 13, 1968) is an American college basketball coach who is the head coach of the UAB Blazers men's basketball team. He was head men's basketball coach at the University of Mississippi (Ole Miss) from 2006 to 2018. Kennedy was a player in high school at both Winston Academy and Louisville High School. He was a 1986 Parade All-American and he went on to play for North Carolina State and the University of Alabama at Birmingham (UAB). On March 20, 2020, he was announced as the seventh head coach of UAB.

== Playing career ==
=== College ===
Kennedy, a 6'7" forward, was a 1986 Parade All-American, as well as the Mississippi Player of the Year at Louisville High School. He started his collegiate career at North Carolina State where he was a member of Jim Valvano's 1987 Atlantic Coast Conference championship team.

Following his freshman season, Kennedy transferred to UAB where he played under another legendary coach, Gene Bartow. From 1988 to 1991, Kennedy was a two-time all-conference performer that led the Sun Belt Conference in scoring at 21.8 points per game in 1991. Kennedy finished his UAB career as the program's second all-time leading scorer with 1,787 points. Kennedy still holds numerous school and conference records.

On 2022 October 7 Kennedy was inducted into the UAB Sports Hall of Fame. He became just the 4th men's player selected.

=== Professional ===
After graduation, Kennedy played briefly for the NBA's Charlotte Hornets at guard. He later began a three-year professional career abroad, playing in Greece, the Netherlands, Spain and Puerto Rico. Chronic knee problems brought his career to an early end. He had his second ACL tear and subsequently his fifth and final knee operation while playing in Puerto Rico and chose to retire as a player and transition into coaching.

== Professional career ==
=== Early years ===
Kennedy's coaching career began as an assistant for the University of South Alabama during the 1994–95 season. Since then he has also served as an assistant coach at UAB from 1996 to 2001 and the University of Cincinnati from 2001 to 2005. Kennedy's first head coaching position came during the 2005–06 season when he was named interim head coach for Cincinnati after Bob Huggins resigned. He led the Bearcats to a 21–13 record and an NIT appearance that year. He was named the NY Post Big East Coach of the Year. On March 23, 2006 he was named as the head coach of Ole Miss.

=== Ole Miss ===
In his first year as head coach of Ole Miss, Kennedy led the Rebels to a 21–13 overall record and 8–8 in conference play record to become co-champions of the Southeastern Conference Western division. The Rebels made it to the semi-finals of the SEC tournament, but fell to the eventual champions, Florida. The Rebels then received an NIT berth and won the first round against Appalachian State but fell to the eventual runners-up, Clemson.

In December 2008, Kennedy was arrested in Cincinnati after he allegedly punched and shouted racial slurs at a taxicab driver. He was charged with misdemeanor assault and ultimately plead guilty to disorderly conduct.

In 2013 he led Ole Miss to its first NCAA tournament appearance in over a decade, and his first appearance as a head coach. The 12-seed Rebels upset Wisconsin in the round of 64 before losing to 13-seed La Salle.

Kennedy's Rebels earned another NCAA tournament bid in 2015, defeating BYU in the First Four and losing to Xavier in the round of 64.

On February 12, 2018, Kennedy initially announced that he and Ole Miss had agreed to part ways following the 2017–18 season. However, Kennedy resigned effective immediately on February 18, 2018. In his 12 seasons at Ole Miss, Kennedy became the program's all-time wins leader, as well as the only head coach since World War II to finish with a winning record in SEC play. He had won one conference tournament championship, two division championships, and was twice named SEC Coach of the Year.

=== Broadcasting ===
In 2018, Kennedy agreed to a deal with the SEC Network to become a college basketball analyst across the ESPN family of networks. During the 2018–2019 and 2019–2020 seasons, Kennedy was featured as an in-game color analyst, studio analyst, and sideline reporter covering college basketball.

=== UAB ===
After 2 years working with ESPN, on March 20, 2020, Kennedy was hired as the head coach at UAB, replacing Robert Ehsan. In his first year Kennedy led the Blazers to a 22–7 record. The 22 wins were the most by a first year head coach in the NCAA and the most wins for UAB since 2016. Under Kennedy's guide, UAB finished with their highest NET ranking (83) in program history and the program's highest Kenpom ranking (102) since 2011. The Blazers were led by their defense, as they finished with the most conference wins (13) in Conference USA as well as the most series sweeps. UAB finished 4th in the country in scoring defense, and the 4th best turnover margin. For the first time in school history, UAB had 2 members selected to the conference All-Defense team. Kennedy's first year leading his alma mater saw UAB reach its then-4th highest winning percentage in program history, and be one of 17 programs in America with at least 22 wins and 7 or fewer losses.

In 2021-22, Kennedy added transfer Jordan Walker in route to UAB's first NCAA Tournament appearance since 2015. The Blazers finished with a record of 27-8, a then-school record for wins in a single season. Kennedy's squad finished 49th in the NET ranking 51 in Kenpom ranking The Blazers ranked 4th nationally in steals and 6th in scoring offense. UAB had two players selected All-Conference USA and one selected to the All-Defense team. Walker was also named Conference USA Player of the Year.

Kennedy's 3rd season added multiple major program accomplishments. UAB finished the campaign with a record of 29-10, a new UAB single-season record for wins (29). Kennedy led the Blazers to their second straight post-season with an appearance in the final of the NIT, their first since 2016, and UAB's first ever appearance in the final of a post-season tournament. The Blazers defeated Southeastern Conference Members Vanderbilt, Georgia, and South Carolina, UAB's first win in Bartow Arena vs a Power 5 opponent since 2013, and the 1st time in history winning three games vs the SEC in the same season. UAB finished the season ranked 47 in KenPom, the programs highest mark since 2004, and Jordan Walker and Trey Jemison each were named All-Conference USA with Jemison also being named to the All-Defensive team. The Blazers also finished 2nd nationally in rebounding.

2023-24 was Kennedy fourth and UAB's first season in the American Athletic Conference. The Blazers finished the year with a record of 23-12, winning the AAC tournament championship, and advancing to their 2nd NCAA Tournament in 3 seasons, and 3rd straight post-season appearance. Kennedy also became the fastest coach in UAB program history to reach the 100-win milestone (136 games). The Blazers defeated Maryland, their first win against a Big Ten Conference opponent since 2006. UAB also defeated two nationally ranked opponents for the first time since 2010. Junior forward Yaxel Lendeborg was named First-Team all-AAC and the conference Defensive Player of the Year, the first time UAB has had at least one first team selection three consecutive years since 2012.

Kennedy's 5th Season saw a fourth consecutive appearance in both the conference tournament final, and the postseason. UAB finished with a record of 24-13, and finishing their season in the NIT Quarterfinals. It was the 1st time in UAB history to win 20 or more games in 5 consecutive seasons, and 23 or more games in four straight campaigns. The Blazers' 4th consecutive postseason was its first since 2007-11, and 125 wins is the winningest 5-year period in UAB history. Yaxel Lendeborg repeated as both First-Team all-AAC and AAC Defensive Player of the Year. Alejandro Vasquez was named Second-Team all-AAC. Kennedy also become the Blazers' 2nd winningest all-time coach after the AAC Tournament semifinal win over North Texas. Further, Yaxel Lendeborg under Kennedy’s development would go on to be the #11 pick of the 2026 NBA Draft.

2025-26 showed a brand new roster, with no returning scholarship players from the 2024-25 season. The Blazers recorded a 6th consecutive 20-win season, the longest such streak in UAB history, finishing with a record of 20-12. It is also the winingest six-year stretch in Blazers history, recording 145 wins. Additionally, it was the 6th straight top-4 league finish. UAB went unbeaten (9-0) on the road in American Athletic Conference play, only the 2nd-time in AAC history it has been accomplished. The Blazers 10 consecutive road wins is also a UAB record. Kennedy also recorded his 400th career win in a 72-47 win over UNC-Asheville.

== Head coaching record ==
Record table
Season	Team	Overall	Conference	Standing	Postseason
Cincinnati Bearcats (Big East Conference) (2005–2006)
2005–06	Cincinnati	21–13	8–8	8th	NIT Quarterfinals
Cincinnati:		21–13 (.618)	8–8 (.500)		
Ole Miss Rebels (Southeastern Conference) (2006–2018)
2006–07	Ole Miss	21–13	8–8	T–1st (West)	NIT Second Round
2007–08	Ole Miss	24–11	7–9	3rd (West)	NIT Semifinals
2008–09	Ole Miss	16–15	7–9	T–4th (West)	
2009–10	Ole Miss	24–11	9–7	T–1st (West)	NIT Semifinals
2010–11	Ole Miss	20–14	7–9	T–3rd (West)	NIT First Round
2011–12	Ole Miss	20–14	8–8	T–6th	NIT First Round
2012–13	Ole Miss	27–9	12–6	T–2nd	NCAA Division I Round of 32
2013–14	Ole Miss	19–14	9–9	T–6th	
2014–15	Ole Miss	21–13	11–7	T–3rd	NCAA Division I Round of 64
2015–16	Ole Miss	20–12	10–8	T–6th	
2016–17	Ole Miss	22–14	10–8	T–5th	NIT Quarterfinals
2017–18	Ole Miss	11–16	4–10		
Ole Miss:		245–156 (.611)	102–98 (.510)		
UAB Blazers (Conference USA) (2020–2023)
2020–21	UAB	22–7	13–5	2nd (West)	
2021–22	UAB	27–8	14–4	2nd (West)	NCAA Division I Round of 64
2022–23	UAB	29–10	14–6	3rd	NIT Runner-up
UAB Blazers (American Conference) (2023–present)
2023–24	UAB	23–12	12–6	4th	NCAA Division I Round of 64
2024–25	UAB	24–13	13–5	3rd	NIT Quarterfinals
2025–26	UAB	20–12	11–7	4th	
2026–27	UAB	4–2	0–0		
UAB:		149–64 (.700)	77–33 (.700)		
Total:		415–233 (.640)			
National champion Postseason invitational champion Conference regular season champion Conference regular season and conference tournament champion Division regular season champion Division regular season and conference tournament champion Conference tournament champion
