= 1982–83 UAB Blazers men's basketball team =

American college basketball season

1982–83 UAB Blazers men's basketball

Sun Belt tournament champions

NCAA tournament
- Conference: Sun Belt Conference
- Record: 19–14 (9–5 Sun Belt)
- Head coach: Gene Bartow (5th season)
- Home arena: BJCC Coliseum

1982–83 Sun Belt Conference men's basketball standings
	Conf.				Overall
Team	W		L	PCT	W		L	PCT
Old Dominion	12	–	2	.857	19	–	10	.655
VCU	12	–	2	.857	24	–	7	.774
UAB †	9	–	5	.643	19	–	14	.576
South Florida	8	–	6	.571	22	–	10	.688
South Alabama	6	–	8	.429	16	–	12	.571
UNC Charlotte	5	–	9	.357	8	–	20	.286
Western Kentucky	4	–	10	.286	12	–	16	.429
Jacksonville	0	–	14	.000	7	–	22	.241
† 1983 Sun Belt Conference tournament winner Rankings from AP Poll

The 1982–83 UAB Blazers men's basketball team represented the University of Alabama at Birmingham as a member of the Sun Belt Conference during the 1982–83 NCAA Division I men's basketball season. This was head coach Gene Bartow's fifth season at UAB, and the Blazers played their home games at BJCC Coliseum. They finished the season 19–14, 9–5 in Sun Belt play and won the Sun Belt tournament. They received an automatic bid to the NCAA tournament as No. 10 seed in the Mideast region. The Blazers fell to Oklahoma in the opening round, 71–63.

== Roster ==
1982–83 UAB Blazers men's basketball team
Players
Coaches

Pos.	#	Name	Height	Weight	Year	Hometown
G	10	McKinley Singleton	6 ft 5 in (1.96 m)	170 lb (77 kg)	Jr	Memphis, Tennessee
G	11	Murry Bartow	5 ft 10 in (1.78 m)	160 lb (73 kg)	So	Birmingham, Alabama
F	12	Marvin Ray Johnson	6 ft 7 in (2.01 m)	—	So	Birmingham, Alabama
G	14	Steve Mitchell	6 ft 5 in (1.96 m)	195 lb (88 kg)	Fr	Memphis, Tennessee
G	15	Luellen Foster	6 ft 4 in (1.93 m)	165 lb (75 kg)	Jr	Birmingham, Alabama
F	34	Cliff Pruitt	6 ft 7 in (2.01 m)	190 lb (86 kg)	Sr	Carson, California
F	40	Jerome Mincy	6 ft 6 in (1.98 m)	215 lb (98 kg)	Fr	Memphis, Tennessee

Head coach

- Gene Bartow

Assistant coach(es)

Legend

- (C) Team captain
- (S) Suspended
- (I) Ineligible
- (W) Walk-on
- Injured
- Current redshirt

Roster

== Schedule and results ==
Date time, TV	Rank^{#}	Opponent^{#}	Result	Record	Site (attendance) city, state
Regular season
Nov 26, 1982*		Auburn	L 61–63	0–1	Birmingham-Jefferson Civic Center (16,797); Birmingham, Alabama
Nov 27, 1982*		UMKC	W 80–60	1–1	Birmingham-Jefferson Civic Center (6,677); Birmingham, Alabama
Dec 1, 1982*		at Baylor	L 55–56	1–2	Heart O' Texas Coliseum (5,530); Waco, Texas
Dec 7, 1982*		at Ole Miss	L 54–66	1–3	Tad Smith Coliseum (5,163); Oxford, Mississippi
Dec 11, 1982*		Wichita State	L 88–89 ^{OT}	1–4	Birmingham-Jefferson Civic Center (7,742); Birmingham, Alabama
Dec 14, 1982*		Columbus College	W 56–42	2–4	Birmingham-Jefferson Civic Center (3,802); Birmingham, Alabama
Dec 17, 1982*		vs. Mississippi State; Krystal Classic	L 47–67	2–5	(7,350); Chattanooga, Tennessee
Dec 18, 1982*		vs. Navy; Krystal Classic	W 71–57	3–5	(8,335); Chattanooga, Tennessee
Dec 20, 1982*		Saint Louis	W 66–47	4–5	Birmingham-Jefferson Civic Center (8,887); Birmingham, Alabama
Dec 22, 1982*		at Hawaii	L 61–65	4–6	Neal S. Blaisdell Center (2,961); Honolulu, Hawaii
Dec 23, 1982*		at Hawaii Pacific	W 92–64	5–6	(43); Kaneohe, Hawaii
Dec 28, 1982*		Alaska Anchorage; UAB Classic	W 102–60	6–6	Birmingham-Jefferson Civic Center (5,107); Birmingham, Alabama
Dec 29, 1982*		Murray State; UAB Classic	L 75–81	6–7	Birmingham-Jefferson Civic Center (8,872); Birmingham, Alabama
Jan 4, 1983		VCU	L 65–67	6–8 (0–1)	Birmingham-Jefferson Civic Center (5,895); Birmingham, Alabama
Jan 8, 1983		South Alabama	W 73–67	7–8 (1–1)	Birmingham-Jefferson Civic Center (7,024); Birmingham, Alabama
Jan 13, 1983		at South Florida	L 63–64	7–9 (1–2)	Sun Dome (6,157); Tampa, Florida
Jan 16, 1983		Jacksonville	W 74–73	8–9 (2–2)	Birmingham-Jefferson Civic Center (4,057); Birmingham, Alabama
Jan 20, 1983*		Old Dominion	W 71–60	9–9 (3–2)	Birmingham-Jefferson Civic Center (1,431); Birmingham, Alabama
Jan 22, 1983		at Jacksonville	W 82–65	10–9 (4–2)	Jacksonville Memorial Coliseum (4,672); Jacksonville, Florida
Jan 25, 1983		at Western Kentucky	W 68–66 ^{OT}	11–9 (5–2)	E.A. Diddle Arena (6,400); Bowling Green, Kentucky
Jan 29, 1983*		DePaul	L 54–56	11–10	Birmingham-Jefferson Civic Center (9,783); Birmingham, Alabama
Feb 3, 1983		UNC Charlotte	W 73–60	12–10 (6–2)	Birmingham-Jefferson Civic Center (5,302); Birmingham, Alabama
Feb 5, 1983		Western Kentucky	W 61–56	13–10 (7–2)	Birmingham-Jefferson Civic Center (7,188); Birmingham, Alabama
Feb 12, 1983		at UNC Charlotte	W 78–70	14–10 (8–2)	Charlotte Coliseum (3,325); Charlotte, North Carolina
Feb 17, 1983		at VCU	L 68–80	14–11 (8–3)	Richmond Coliseum (7,200); Richmond, Virginia
Feb 19, 1983		at South Alabama	W 85–80	15–11 (9–3)	Jaguar Gym (7,527); Mobile, Alabama
Feb 23, 1983		South Florida	L 64–69	15–12 (9–4)	Birmingham-Jefferson Civic Center (4,876); Birmingham, Alabama
Feb 27, 1983		at Old Dominion	L 57–84	15–13 (9–5)	Norfolk Scope (7,607); Norfolk, Virginia
Mar 1, 1983*		Samford	W 66–65	16–13	Birmingham-Jefferson Civic Center (4,610); Birmingham, Alabama
Sun Belt tournament
Mar 4, 1983*	(3)	(6) UNC Charlotte; Quarterfinals	W 65–63	17–13	Birmingham-Jefferson Civic Center (10,234); Birmingham, Alabama
Mar 5, 1983*	(3)	(2) VCU; Semifinals	W 61–59	18–13	Birmingham-Jefferson Civic Center (13,777); Birmingham, Alabama
Mar 6, 1983*	(3)	vs. (4) South Florida; Championship game	W 64–47	19–13	Birmingham-Jefferson Civic Center (11,609); Birmingham, Alabama
NCAA tournament
Mar 18, 1983*	(10 ME)	vs. (7 ME) Oklahoma; First round	L 63–71	19–14	Roberts Municipal Stadium (11,900); Evansville, Indiana
*Non-conference game. ^{#}Rankings from AP poll. (#) Tournament seedings in parentheses. ME=Mideast.
