= 2014–15 UAB Blazers men's basketball team =

American college basketball season

2014–15 UAB Blazers men's basketball

Conference USA Tournament champions

NCAA tournament, round of 32
- Conference: Conference USA
- Record: 20–16 (12–6 C-USA)
- Head coach: Jerod Haase (3rd season)
- Assistant coaches: Robert Ehsan; Turner Battle; Jeff Wulbrun
- Home arena: Bartow Arena

2014–15 Conference USA men's basketball standings
	Conf.				Overall
Team	W		L	PCT	W		L	PCT
Louisiana Tech	15	–	3	.833	27	–	9	.750
Old Dominion	13	–	5	.722	27	–	8	.771
UTEP	13	–	5	.722	22	–	11	.667
WKU	12	–	6	.667	20	–	12	.625
UAB †	12	–	6	.667	20	–	16	.556
Middle Tennessee	9	–	9	.500	19	–	17	.528
FIU	8	–	10	.444	16	–	17	.485
UTSA	8	–	10	.444	14	–	16	.467
North Texas	8	–	10	.444	14	–	17	.452
Rice	8	–	10	.444	12	–	20	.375
Charlotte	7	–	11	.389	14	–	18	.438
Marshall	7	–	11	.389	11	–	21	.344
Southern Miss*	4	–	14	.222	9	–	20	.310
Florida Atlantic	2	–	16	.111	9	–	20	.310
† 2015 C-USA Tournament winner *Ineligible for postseason play due to self-imposed postseason ban

The 2014–15 UAB Blazers men's basketball team represented the University of Alabama at Birmingham during the 2014–15 NCAA Division I men's basketball season. The Blazers, led by third year head coach Jerod Haase, played their home games at Bartow Arena. They were members of Conference USA. They finished the season 20–16, 12–6 in C-USA play to finish in a tie for fourth place. They defeated WKU, Louisiana Tech, and Middle Tennessee to become champions of the C-USA tournament. They received the conference's automatic bid to the NCAA tournament as a No. 14 seed where they upset No. 3-seeded and No. 9-ranked Iowa State in the first round before losing in the second round to No. 11-seeded UCLA.

== Previous season ==
The Blazers finished the 2013–14 season 18–13, 7–9 in C-USA play to finish in a tie for eighth place. They lost in the second round of the C-USA tournament to Charlotte.

== Departures ==
Name	Number	Pos.	Height	Weight	Year	Hometown	Notes
Robert Williams	5	G	6'4"	210	RS Senior	Greenville, MS	Graduated
Thaddeaus Rideau	11	G	6'4"	168	Junior	Port Arthur, TX	Transferred to Midwestern State
K.C. Whitaker	12	G	6'6"	185	RS Sophomore	Ashburn, VA	Injured
Fahro Alihodzic	15	C	6'10"	240	Senior	Vlasenica, Bosnia and Herzegovina	Graduated
Preston Purifoy	24	F	6'5"	220	Senior	Conway, AR	Graduated
Rod Rucker	42	F	6'5"	220	Senior	Elberton, GA	Graduated
Jordan Swing	44	F	6'6"	200	Senior	Birmingham, AL	Graduated

=== Incoming transfers ===
Name	Number	Pos.	Height	Weight	Year	Hometown	Previous School
Hakeem Baxter	0	G	6'2"	170	Sophomore	Philadelphia, PA	Transferred from Maryland Eastern Shore. Under NCAA transfer rules, Baxter will have to sit out for the 2014–15 season. Will have three years of remaining eligibility.

== Class of 2014 recruits ==
College recruiting information
Name	Hometown	School	Height	Weight	Commit date
William Lee; PF	Plantersville, AL	Dallas County High School	6 ft 9 in (2.06 m)	210 lb (95 kg)	Nov 12, 2013
William Lee; PF	Recruit ratings: Scout: Rivals: (85)				
Lewis Sullivan; SF	Meridianville, AL	Hazel Green High School	6 ft 7 in (2.01 m)	195 lb (88 kg)	Jul 2, 2013
Lewis Sullivan; SF	Recruit ratings: Scout: Rivals: (69)				
Nick Norton; PG	Bloomington, IL	Central Catholic High School	5 ft 10 in (1.78 m)	175 lb (79 kg)	Mar 22, 2014
Nick Norton; PG	Recruit ratings: Scout: Rivals: (59)				
Jarvis Calhoun; PG	Trussville, AL	Hewitt-Trussville High School	6 ft 0 in (1.83 m)	155 lb (70 kg)	Mar 2, 2013
Jarvis Calhoun; PG	Recruit ratings: Scout: Rivals: (59)				
Chris Cokley; PF	Savannah, GA	Savannah High School	6 ft 8 in (2.03 m)	216 lb (98 kg)	Nov 2, 2013
Chris Cokley; PF	Recruit ratings: Scout: Rivals: (NR)				
Denzel Collins; PG	Walterboro, SC	USC Salkehatchie	6 ft 2 in (1.88 m)	217 lb (98 kg)	Aug 3, 2014
Denzel Collins; PG	Recruit ratings: Scout: Rivals: (NR)				
Overall recruit ranking:
Note: In many cases, Scout, Rivals, 247Sports, On3, and ESPN may conflict in their listings of height and weight.; In these cases, the average was taken. ESPN grades are on a 100-point scale.; Sources: "2014 Team Ranking". Rivals.

=== Class of 2015 recruits ===
College recruiting information
Name	Hometown	School	Height	Weight	Commit date
Dirk Williams; SG	Homewood, AL	Tallahassee Community College	6 ft 5 in (1.96 m)	175 lb (79 kg)	N/A
Dirk Williams; SG	Recruit ratings: Scout: Rivals: (JR)				
Overall recruit ranking:
Note: In many cases, Scout, Rivals, 247Sports, On3, and ESPN may conflict in their listings of height and weight.; In these cases, the average was taken. ESPN grades are on a 100-point scale.; Sources: "2015 Team Ranking". Rivals.

== Roster ==
2014–15 UAB Blazers men's basketball team
Players
Coaches

Pos.	#	Name	Height	Weight	Year	Hometown
G	0	Hakeem Baxter (redshirt)	6 ft 2 in (1.88 m)	170 lb (77 kg)	So	Philadelphia, PA
G	1	Denzell Watts	6 ft 2 in (1.88 m)	207 lb (94 kg)	So	Flint, MI
G	2	Nick Norton	5 ft 10 in (1.78 m)	175 lb (79 kg)	Fr	Bloomington, IL
F	3	Chris Cokley	6 ft 8 in (2.03 m)	216 lb (98 kg)	Fr	Savannah, GA
G	4	Robert Brown	6 ft 5 in (1.96 m)	190 lb (86 kg)	RS Jr	Clermont, FL
G	5	Jarvis Calhoun	6 ft 0 in (1.83 m)	165 lb (75 kg)	Fr	Trussville, AL
F	21	Tosin Mehinti	6 ft 9 in (2.06 m)	213 lb (97 kg)	So	Lithonia, GA
G	22	Tyler Madison	6 ft 4 in (1.93 m)	225 lb (102 kg)	So	Columbiana, AL
F	25	C.J. Washington	6 ft 8 in (2.03 m)	219 lb (99 kg)	Sr	Augusta, GA
F	34	William Lee	6 ft 9 in (2.06 m)	210 lb (95 kg)	Fr	Plantersville, AL
F	35	Lewis Sullivan	6 ft 7 in (2.01 m)	195 lb (88 kg)	Fr	Hazen Green, AL
G	40	Denzel Collins	6 ft 2 in (1.88 m)	200 lb (91 kg)	Sr	Savannah, GA
G	45	Lionel Love (W)	6 ft 3 in (1.91 m)	165 lb (75 kg)	Fr	Huntsville, AL

Head coach

Jerod Haase

Assistant coach(es)

Robert Ehsan

Richie Riley

Jeff Wulbrun

Legend

- (C) Team captain
- (S) Suspended
- (I) Ineligible
- (W) Walk-on
- Injured
- Current redshirt

Roster

== Schedule ==
Date time, TV	Rank^{#}	Opponent^{#}	Result	Record	Site (attendance) city, state
Exhibition
11/07/2014*; 7:00 pm		UNC Pembroke	L 71–72	–	Bartow Arena (2,133); Birmingham, AL
Non-conference regular season
11/15/2014*; 7:00 pm		Louisiana–Monroe; Battle 4 Atlantis Opening Round	L 65–74	0–1	Bartow Arena (2,403); Birmingham, AL
11/17/2014*; 7:00 pm		Young Harris	W 94–81	1–1	Bartow Arena (2,071); Birmingham, AL
11/20/2014*; 7:00 pm		South Florida	L 71–73 ^{OT}	1–2	Bartow Arena (2,501); Birmingham, AL
11/23/2014*; 2:00 pm		Jackson State	W 58–50	2–2	Bartow Arena (2,023); Birmingham, AL
11/26/2014*; 6:00 pm, AXS TV		vs. No. 2 Wisconsin; Battle 4 Atlantis quarterfinals	L 43–72	2–3	Imperial Arena (2,633); Nassau, BAH
11/27/2014*; 8:30 pm, AXS TV		vs. No. 18 Florida; Battle 4 Atlantis consolation round	L 47–56	2–4	Imperial Arena (2,408); Nassau, BAH
11/28/2014*; 9:30 pm, AXS TV		vs. No. 22 UCLA; Battle 4 Atlantis 7th place game	L 76–88	2–5	Imperial Arena (517); Nassau, BAH
12/04/2014*; 7:00 pm, ASN		Morehead State	W 58–48	3–5	Bartow Arena (3,029); Birmingham, AL
12/07/2014*; 2:00 pm, ASN		Illinois State	L 74–78	3–6	Bartow Arena (2,234); Birmingham, AL
12/14/2014*; 7:00 pm, ASN		UNC Asheville	W 79–71	4–6	Bartow Arena (2,146); Birmingham, AL
12/18/2014*; 8:00 pm, CBSSN		LSU	L 70–79	4–7	Bartow Arena (6,054); Birmingham, AL
12/22/2014*; 7:00 pm, ASN		at Chattanooga	L 67–83	4–8	McKenzie Arena (2,609); Chattanooga, TN
12/27/2014*; 6:30 pm, ESPN2		at No. 20 North Carolina	L 58–89	4–9	Dean Smith Center (19,124); Chapel Hill, NC
Conference USA regular season
01/04/2015; 2:00 pm		at Middle Tennessee	W 54–49	5–9 (1–0)	Murphy Center (3,605); Murfreesboro, TN
01/08/2015; 7:00 pm		Florida Atlantic	W 66–57	6–9 (2–0)	Bartow Arena (2,385); Birmingham, AL
01/10/2015; 2:00 pm		FIU	W 70–53	7–9 (3–0)	Bartow Arena (2,806); Birmingham, AL
01/15/2015; 7:00 pm, ASN		at Louisiana Tech	L 71–74	7–10 (3–1)	Thomas Assembly Center (3,815); Ruston, LA
01/17/2015; 7:00 pm		at Southern Miss	W 63–56	8–10 (4–1)	Reed Green Coliseum (3,493); Hattiesburg, MS
01/22/2015; 7:00 pm		Charlotte	W 81–76 ^{OT}	9–10 (5–1)	Bartow Arena (3,029); Birmingham, AL
01/24/2015; 4:30 pm, ASN		Old Dominion	W 81–68	10–10 (6–1)	Bartow Arena (4,127); Birmingham, AL
01/29/2015; 8:00 pm, CBSSN		at UTEP	L 69–71	10–11 (6–2)	Don Haskins Center (7,455); El Paso, TX
01/31/2015; 2:00 pm		at UTSA	W 65–57	11–11 (7–2)	Convocation Center (1,252); San Antonio, TX
02/05/2015; 8:00 pm, CBSSN		Louisiana Tech	W 80–60	12–11 (8–2)	Bartow Arena (4,068); Birmingham, AL
02/07/2015; 2:00 pm		Southern Miss	W 78–68	13–11 (9–2)	Bartow Arena (3,786); Birmingham, AL
02/12/2015; 7:00 pm		at North Texas	L 64–67	13–12 (9–3)	The Super Pit (2,611); Denton, TX
02/14/2015; 7:00 pm		at Rice	L 73–82 ^{2OT}	13–13 (9–4)	Tudor Fieldhouse (1,647); Houston, TX
02/19/2015; 7:00 pm		at WKU	W 71–66	14–13 (10–4)	Bartow Arena (3,892); Birmingham, AL
02/22/2015; 7:00 pm		Marshall	W 72–54	15–13 (11–4)	Bartow Arena (4,068); Birmingham, AL
02/28/2015; 2:00 pm, ASN		Middle Tennessee	W 100–95 ^{3OT}	16–13 (12–4)	Bartow Arena (4,761); Birmingham, AL
03/05/2015; 6:00 pm		at Florida Atlantic	L 59–62	16–14 (12–5)	FAU Arena (1,005); Boca Raton, FL
03/07/2015; 7:00 pm, ASN		at FIU	L 66–70	16–15 (12–6)	FIU Arena (951); Miami, FL
Conference USA tournament
03/12/2015; 6:00 pm, ASN	(4)	vs. (5) WKU; Quarterfinals	W 53–52	17–15	Birmingham–Jefferson Convention Complex (6,922); Birmingham, AL
03/13/2015; 5:30 pm, CBSSN	(4)	vs. (1) Louisiana Tech; Semifinals	W 72–62 ^{OT}	18–15	Birmingham–Jefferson Convention Complex (6,429); Birmingham, AL
03/14/2015; 2:30 pm, FS1	(4)	vs. (6) Middle Tennessee; Championship	W 73–60	19–15	Birmingham–Jefferson Convention Complex (8,279); Birmingham, AL
NCAA tournament
03/19/2015*; 11:40 am, truTV	(14 S)	vs. (3 S) No. 9 Iowa State; Second Round	W 60–59	20–15	KFC Yum! Center (N/A); Louisville, KY
03/21/2015*; 11:10 am, CBS	(14 S)	vs. (11 S) UCLA; Third Round	L 75–92	20–16	KFC Yum! Center (21,760); Louisville, KY
*Non-conference game. ^{#}Rankings from AP Poll. (#) Tournament seedings in parentheses. All times are in Central Time. (#) during NCAA Tournament is seed with Region S=South.
