= Jordan Smith (American football) =

American gridiron football player (born 1998)

Profile
- Position: Defensive lineman

Personal information
- Born: April 10, 1998 (age 28); Lithonia, Georgia, U.S.
- Listed height: 6 ft 6 in (1.98 m)
- Listed weight: 255 lb (116 kg)

Career information
- High school: Lithonia
- College: Florida (2016–2017); Butler CC (2018); UAB (2019–2020)
- NFL draft: 2021: 4th round, 121st overall pick

Career history
- Jacksonville Jaguars (2021–2023); Kansas City Chiefs (2024)*; Saskatchewan Roughriders (2025)*; Ottawa Redblacks (2026)*
- * Offseason or practice squad member only

Awards and highlights
- First-team All-C-USA (2020); Second-team All-C-USA (2019)

Career NFL statistics
- Total tackles: 1
- Stats at Pro Football Reference

Jordan Smith (born April 10, 1998) is an American professional football defensive lineman. He played college football at Florida, Butler (KS) and UAB.

== Early life ==
Smith grew up in Lithonia, Georgia and attended Lithonia High School, where he played basketball and football. He had 71 tackles with 18.5 tackles for loss and 7.5 sacks as a junior. He was rated a four-star recruit and initially committed to play college football at the South Carolina during the summer before his senior year. As a senior, Smith led the team with 104 tackles and was named class AAAA All-State. He later flipped his commitment from South Carolina to the University of Florida.

== College career ==
Smith began his collegiate career at Florida and redshirted his true freshman year. He was suspended for his redshirt freshman season along with eight other players due to his involvement in a credit card fraud scheme. After the season Smith transferred to Butler Community College in El Dorado, Kansas. In his only season with the Grizzlies, Smith had 77 tackles, 22.5 tackles for loss, 11 sacks, three pass breakups and a forced fumble and was named first-team All-Jayhawk Conference. Smith committed to continue his career at UAB over offers from UNLV and Marshall.

Smith became an immediate starter for the Blazers as a redshirt sophomore and was named second-team All-Conference USA after leading the team with 17.5 tackles for loss, ten sacks and four forced fumbles. Smith was named first-team all-conference after finishing his redshirt junior season with 43 tackles, 9.5 for loss, 4.5 sacks, and an interception.

== Professional career ==
Pre-draft measurables
Height	Weight	Arm length	Hand span	40-yard dash	10-yard split	20-yard split	20-yard shuttle	Three-cone drill	Vertical jump	Broad jump	Bench press
6 ft 5 7/8 in (1.98 m)	264 lb (120 kg)	33 3/8 in (0.85 m)	9 1/4 in (0.23 m)	4.83 s	1.77 s	2.80 s	4.80 s	7.97 s	33.0 in (0.84 m)	9 ft 9 in (2.97 m)	16 reps
All values from Pro Day

=== Jacksonville Jaguars ===
Smith was drafted by the Jacksonville Jaguars in the fourth round, 121st overall, of the 2021 NFL draft. On May 18, 2021, Smith signed his four-year rookie contract with Jacksonville. After being inactive for the first 14 games, he made his NFL debut in Week 16.

On June 14, 2022, Smith was placed on injured reserve after suffering a knee injury during OTAs. He was waived on August 29, 2023.

=== Kansas City Chiefs ===
On January 10, 2024, Smith signed a reserve/future contract with the Kansas City Chiefs. He was waived on May 4, 2024.

=== Saskatchewan Roughriders ===
On February 5, 2025, it was announced that Smith had signed with the Saskatchewan Roughriders. He was waived on May 10.

=== Ottawa Redblacks ===
On February 12, 2026, it was announced that Smith had signed with the Ottawa Redblacks. He was released on May 9, 2026.
