= 1983 Sun Belt Conference men's basketball tournament =

Sport competition

- Classification: Division I
- Season: 1982–83
- Teams: 8
- Site: BJCC Coliseum; Birmingham, AL
- Champions: UAB (2nd title)
- Winning coach: Gene Bartow (2nd title)
- MVP: Cliff Pruitt (UAB)

1982–83 Sun Belt Conference men's basketball standings
| | Conf. | | | | Overall |
| Team | W | | L | PCT | W | | L | PCT |
|---|---|---|---|---|---|---|---|---|
| Old Dominion | 12 | – | 2 | .857 | 19 | – | 10 | .655 |
| VCU | 12 | – | 2 | .857 | 24 | – | 7 | .774 |
| UAB † | 9 | – | 5 | .643 | 19 | – | 14 | .576 |
| South Florida | 8 | – | 6 | .571 | 22 | – | 10 | .688 |
| South Alabama | 6 | – | 8 | .429 | 16 | – | 12 | .571 |
| UNC Charlotte | 5 | – | 9 | .357 | 8 | – | 20 | .286 |
| Western Kentucky | 4 | – | 10 | .286 | 12 | – | 16 | .429 |
| Jacksonville | 0 | – | 14 | .000 | 7 | – | 22 | .241 |
† 1983 Sun Belt Conference tournament winner Rankings from AP Poll

The 1983 Sun Belt Conference men's basketball tournament was held March 5–7 at the BJCC Coliseum in Birmingham, Alabama.

UAB topped South Florida in the championship game, 64–47, to win their second overall, as well as second consecutive, Sun Belt men's basketball tournament.

The Blazers, in turn, received an automatic bid for the 1983 NCAA tournament, where they lost to Oklahoma in the First Round. They were joined in the tournament field by VCU, who received an at-large bid.

== Format ==
With the additions of Old Dominion and Western Kentucky prior to the season, the Sun Belt's membership returned to eight teams. As such, it reverted to its old format of placing all eight teams in the initial quarterfinal round, with each team being seeded based on its regular season conference record. All byes were eliminated.

== Bracket ==
Quarterfinals; Friday, March 4
1 | Old Dominion | 59
8 | Jacksonville | 63
5 | South Alabama | 59
4 | South Florida | 66
3 | UAB | 65
6 | UNC Charlotte | 63
7 | Western Kentucky | 55
2 | VCU | 57

Semifinals; Saturday, March 5
8 | Jacksonville | 58
4 | South Florida | 71
3 | UAB | 61
2 | VCU | 59

Championship; Sunday, March 6
4 | South Florida | 47
3 | UAB | 64
