= Lithonia High School =

Public high school in Stonecrest, Georgia, United States

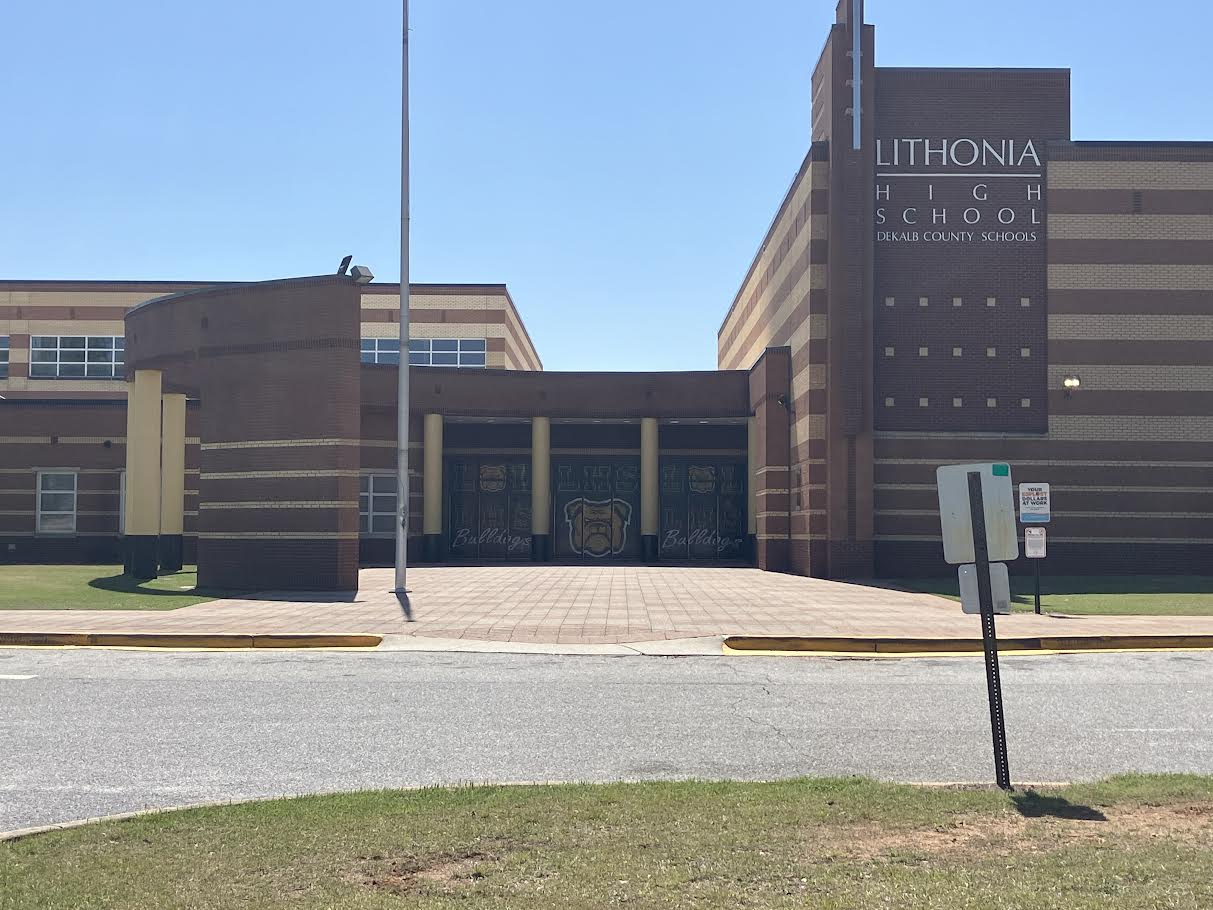
- Front of School (April 2025)

Location
- 2440 Phillips Road; Stonecrest (Lithonia address), GA; United States; 33°43′30″N 84°07′46″W

Information
- Type: Public
- School district: DeKalb County School District
- Principal: Dr. Mulanta Wilkins
- Teaching staff: 85.00 (FTE)
- Grades: 9–12
- Enrollment: 1,504 (2023-2024)
- Student to teacher ratio: 17.69
- Campus: Urban
- Colors: Black and gold
- Mascot: Bulldog
- Website: http://www.lithoniahs.dekalb.k12.ga.us/Default.aspx

Lithonia High School is a public high school located in Stonecrest, Georgia, United States, near Lithonia. A part of the DeKalb County School District, it serves 1,450 students in grades 9–12. Darrick McCray is the current principal. The school offers many clubs and extracurricular activities, including book club, Men of Distinction, Future Business Leaders of America, robotics, marching band, and chorus. Sports include baseball, football, basketball, volleyball, swimming, golf, tennis, soccer, track, gymnastics, cheerleading, softball, and wrestling.

The school was formerly in the Redan census-designated place.

As of the 2013–2014 school year, students at Lithonia High are required to wear school uniforms.

In 2014, 2015 and 2016, Lithonia was recognized for having a Gates Millennium Scholar.

== Accreditation ==
On December 17, 2012, the Southern Association of Colleges and Schools announced that it had downgraded the DeKalb County Schools System's status from "on advisement" to "on probation," and warned the school system that the loss of their accreditation was "imminent."

However, DeKalb County named Lithonia as one of its top ten improved schools in 2012.

== Notable alumni ==
- Matt Battaglia – former All-American football player, NFL player, actor, Emmy-winning producer
- Alton Brown – Food Network personality
- Kelvin Cato – retired NBA basketball player
- Max Cleland – United States Senator, 1997–2003
- Eric Gaines – basketball player
- Broderick Jones – NFL offensive tackle for the Pittsburgh Steelers
- Mike Potts – former Major League Baseball player
- Jordan Smith – NFL defensive end for the Jacksonville Jaguars
