= Robert Vaden (basketball) =

American basketball player (born 1985)

Personal information
- Born: March 3, 1985 (age 41) Indianapolis, Indiana, U.S.
- Listed height: 6 ft 5 in (1.96 m)
- Listed weight: 215 lb (98 kg)

Career information
- High school: Cathedral (Indianapolis, Indiana); Pike (Indianapolis, Indiana); Bridgton Academy (Bridgton, Maine)
- College: Indiana (2004–2006); UAB (2007–2009)
- NBA draft: 2009: 2nd round, 54th overall pick
- Drafted by: Charlotte Bobcats
- Playing career: 2009–2017
- Position: Shooting guard / small forward

Career history
- 2009–2010: Aget Imola
- 2010–2011: Tulsa 66ers
- 2011: BK SPU Nitra
- 2012: Tulsa 66ers
- 2012–2013: Telekom Baskets Bonn
- 2013–2014: Belfius Mons-Hainaut
- 2014–2015: Bakersfield Jam
- 2015, 2016: Westchester Knicks
- 2017: Erie BayHawks

Career highlights
- First-team All-Conference USA (2008); Second-team All-Conference USA (2009); Fourth-team Parade All-American (2004)
- Stats at NBA.com
- Stats at Basketball Reference

Robert Anthony Vaden (born March 3, 1985) is an American former professional basketball player. Previously he played for the Erie BayHawks of the NBA Development League. Vaden played college basketball with the Indiana Hoosiers and the UAB Blazers for two years each. After four years in college, he was drafted by the Charlotte Bobcats with the 54th pick in the 2009 NBA draft. After the draft, his draft rights were immediately traded to the Oklahoma City Thunder. However, the Thunder did not sign him to a contract. As a result, he went on to play in Italy, Slovakia, and in the NBA Development League with the Tulsa 66ers, the D-League team affiliated with the Thunder.

== High school career ==
Robert Vaden attended Cathedral High School and Pike High School in Indianapolis, Indiana and Bridgton Academy in Bridgton, Maine. As a senior at Bridgton Academy, Vaden averaged 26 points and 8 rebounds per game, leading the team to a 27–7 record. He played his freshman and sophomore years at Cathedral, before leaving due to a dispute between his parental guardian and the school. He went on to play his junior year at Pike, where he led the Red Devils to an undefeated record (29–0) and the Indiana Class 4A title. He averaged 13.5 points, 5.9 rebounds, and 2.9 assists per game.

Considered a four-star recruit by Rivals.com, Vaden was listed as the No. 8 small forward and the No. 38 player in the nation in 2004.

== College career ==
Vaden began his career at Indiana University, where he started every game in his first two years. In his freshman season, he led the Hoosiers in minutes played (980), free throw percentage (.803), and steals per game (1.55 – fifth in the Big Ten). He was the team's third-leading scorer (10.5) and rebounder (4.3).

In his sophomore campaign, Vaden emerged as one of the top players in the Big Ten. He finished second on the team in scoring (13.5) and rebounding (5.5), while leading the squad in assists (109) and steals (38). The season featured many memorable moments for Vaden, as he had a streak of 12 consecutive three-pointers over a three-game stretch – only three short of the NCAA record. He also set the IU record for three-point percentage in a game, hitting 6–6 in a 12/31/05 game against Ball State. Another high point came in the 2006 NCAA Tournament, where Vaden hit the game-winning three-pointer to lift the Hoosiers over San Diego State in the first round.

At the end of the 2005–06 season, Indiana coach Mike Davis was fired after failing to live up to the high Hoosier expectations, and later accepted the head coaching post at the University of Alabama at Birmingham. Vaden had grown close to his coach when Davis had supported him through his father's death after his freshman year at Indiana and chose to transfer to UAB to continue playing for him.

After sitting out the 2006–07 season due to NCAA transfer policy, Robert Vaden had a breakout junior year, logging one of the best seasons ever for a UAB player. He averaged 21.1 points, 3.5 rebounds, and 2.6 assists per game on the way to first team all-conference honors and being named the Conference USA Newcomer of the year. He set school records for points in a season (695), three-pointers made (142) and three-pointers attempted (355). His 142 three-pointers made were also a conference record and placed him second in the nation in this category. He also holds the UAB career record for scoring average (minimum 25 games) entering his senior year. On February 27, 2008, Vaden hit for 41 points, his career high, in a game against UTEP.

Vaden finished his college career with 2,010 points and hit 379 three-pointers in his career – good for #10 in NCAA history. He owns the UAB single-season records for points, three-pointers made, and attempted and is the school single-game record holder in points (41 – tied with Andy Kennedy), three-point field goals (9), and free throw percentage (11–11, tied with two others).

== Professional career ==
Vaden was automatically eligible for the 2009 NBA draft after finishing his four-year college eligibility. He was projected to be either a second-round pick or undrafted free agent. He was eventually drafted by the Charlotte Bobcats with the 54th pick in the draft and his rights were immediately traded to the Oklahoma City Thunder in exchange for cash considerations. He then played for the Thunder in both 2009 Orlando Summer League and NBA Summer League. He played in all five games in Orlando, averaging 3.0 points in 19.1 minutes per game. He improved his performance in the NBA Summer League, playing in all five games and averaging 7.8 points in 23.0 minutes per game. However, the Thunder didn't sign him to a contract and Vaden weighed the option to play overseas.

Before the training camp began, Vaden signed a contract with Italian second division team Aget Imola. On October 11, he scored 15 points in his first game for Imola, a 73–72 win over Sassari. He played in 29 games and averaged 16.9 points on 40 percent shooting in 35.7 minutes per game.

After one season in Italy, Vaden returned to the U.S. to participate in the 2010 Orlando Summer League with the Thunder. He played in all five games, averaging 4.6 points in 21.0 minutes per game. However, he didn't receive a contract offer or an invitation to the Thunder's training camp for the 2010–11 season.

He then signed a contract to play in the NBA Development League (D-League) and became eligible for the 2010 D-League Draft. On November 1, 2010, Vaden was selected seventh overall by the Rio Grande Valley Vipers. On the next day, he was traded to the Tulsa 66ers, the D-League affiliate of the Thunder, in exchange for Mustafa Shakur. He played 45 games for the 66ers during the season, averaging 10.4 points on 39.2 percent shooting in 28.0 minutes per game. On April 9, 2011, after helping the 66ers win the first round of the D-League Playoffs against the Texas Legends, he was signed by the Thunder and was immediately assigned back to the 66ers. After the 66ers was eliminated from the second round of the playoffs, he was recalled by the Thunder.

During the 2011 NBA lockout, Vaden played for BK SPU Nitra of Slovak basketball league on a three-month contract with an option to return to the NBA after the lockout ends.

On December 13, 2011, the Thunder traded Vaden along with two future draft picks to the Minnesota Timberwolves for Lazar Hayward. After the trade, Vaden was immediately waived by the Timberwolves.

On August 3, 2012, Vaden signed with Telekom Baskets Bonn of Germany's Basketball Bundesliga.

In 2013, Vaden signed with Belfius Mons-Hainaut of Belgium for the 2013–14 season.

On October 24, 2014, Vaden signed with the San Antonio Spurs. However, he was waived by the Spurs the next day. On November 1, 2014, he was selected by the Bakersfield Jam with the eighth overall pick in the 2014 NBA D-League draft. On January 20, 2015, he was traded to the Westchester Knicks in exchange for the returning player rights to Josh Owens. On February 13, 2015, he was waived by Westchester due to a season-ending injury.

On October 31, 2016, Vaden was re-acquired by the Westchester Knicks. On December 22, he was waived by Westchester after 11 games. On January 23, 2017, Vaden was acquired by the Erie BayHawks of the NBA Development League. On March 28, 2017, he was waived by the BayHawks due to a season-ending concussion.

== Career statistics ==
Legend
| GP | Games played | GS | Games started | MPG | Minutes per game |
| FG% | Field goal percentage | 3P% | 3-point field goal percentage | FT% | Free throw percentage |
| RPG | Rebounds per game | APG | Assists per game | SPG | Steals per game |
| BPG | Blocks per game | PPG | Points per game | **Bold** | Career high |

=== College ===
| Year | Team | GP | GS | MPG | FG% | 3P% | FT% | RPG | APG | SPG | BPG | PPG |
|---|---|---|---|---|---|---|---|---|---|---|---|---|
| 2004–05 | Indiana | 29 | 29 | 33.8 | .376 | .370 | .803 | 4.3 | 2.1 | **1.6** | .2 | 10.3 |
| 2005–06 | Indiana | 31 | 31 | 34.4 | **.436** | **.415** | .804 | **5.5** | **3.5** | 1.2 | .2 | 13.5 |
| 2007–08 | Alabama-Birmingham | 33 | 32 | 35.5 | .408 | .400 | **.863** | 3.5 | 2.6 | 1.0 | .2 | **21.1** |
| 2008–09 | Alabama-Birmingham | **34** | **34** | **36.5** | .397 | .346 | .740 | 4.9 | 2.1 | 1.0 | **.6** | 17.6 |
| **Career** | | 127 | 126 | 35.1 | .405 | .382 | .808 | 4.6 | 2.6 | 1.2 | .3 | 15.8 |

=== D-League ===
==== Regular season ====
| Year | Team | GP | GS | MPG | FG% | 3P% | FT% | RPG | APG | SPG | BPG | PPG |
|---|---|---|---|---|---|---|---|---|---|---|---|---|
| 2010–11 | Tulsa | **45** | **17** | **28.0** | **.412** | **.392** | **.714** | **2.4** | **2.2** | **.9** | **.3** | **10.4** |
| **Career** | | 45 | 17 | 28.0 | .412 | .392 | .714 | 2.4 | 2.2 | .9 | .3 | 10.4 |

==== Playoffs ====
| Year | Team | GP | GS | MPG | FG% | 3P% | FT% | RPG | APG | SPG | BPG | PPG |
|---|---|---|---|---|---|---|---|---|---|---|---|---|
| 2011 | Tulsa | **4** | 0 | **32.3** | **.480** | **.480** | **.875** | **4.3** | **1.5** | **.8** | **.2** | **16.8** |
| **Career** | | 4 | 0 | 32.3 | .480 | .480 | .875 | 4.3 | 1.5 | .8 | .2 | 16.8 |

== Personal life ==
He has two children, Brooke and Blake.
