= Carldell Johnson =

American basketball player (born 1983)

Personal information
- Born: January 28, 1983 (age 43) New Orleans, Louisiana, U.S.
- Listed height: 5 ft 10 in (1.78 m)
- Listed weight: 180 lb (82 kg)

Career information
- High school: Marion Abramson (New Orleans, Louisiana)
- College: Salt Lake CC (2002–2003); UAB (2003–2006)
- NBA draft: 2006: undrafted
- Playing career: 2006–2015
- Position: Point guard
- Number: 5
- Coaching career: 2019–present

Career history

Playing
- 2006–2007: Verviers-Pepinster
- 2007: Halcones UV Xalapa
- 2007–2012: Austin Toros
- 2009: Bravos de Piedras Negras
- 2011–2012: New Orleans Hornets
- 2012: Spirou Charleroi
- 2014: Austin Toros
- 2014: Toros de Aragua
- 2014–2015: Valvoline
- 2016: Naúticos de Mazatlán
- 2016: Frayles de Guasave
- 2016–2017: Garzas Guerreras de Tlaxcala

Coaching
- 2019–2021: Memphis Hustle (assistant)

Career highlights
- NBA D-League champion (2012); First-team All-Conference USA (2006); Conference USA Defensive Player of the Year (2006)
- Stats at NBA.com
- Stats at Basketball Reference

Carldell "Squeaky" Johnson (born January 28, 1983) is an American former professional basketball player. He played college basketball for the UAB Blazers from 2003 to 2006 after beginning his collegiate career at Salt Lake Community College. Since turning professional in 2006, he has spent time with three different teams in Mexico and two in Belgium, as well as having multiple stints with the Austin Spurs (then Austin Toros) of the NBA Development League. He has been a non-roster invitee of the San Antonio Spurs on two occasions and played with the New Orleans Hornets during the 2011–12 NBA season.

Johnson holds the record for the most games played for the Austin Toros/Austin Spurs, having a total of 230 games played with the organization.

== Early years ==
Johnson was born on January 28, 1983, in New Orleans, Louisiana, to Lonnie Johnson and Elise Ramsey. He has one brother. When he was 17 years old, his father died of cancer. In December 2011, Carldell said that, "My whole life, I’ve been trying to grind it out and work hard to get where I need to be. My father died from cancer, and I grew up in a tough neighborhood in (eastern) New Orleans, where guys would get bored and find time to get into other things, like stealing cars and walking around looking for fights. But Coach Tillman would always pick me up and have us going to practice, whether it was basketball season or not." He attended John F. Kennedy High School in New Orleans and transferred to Marion Abramson High School for his senior year. At Abramson he played basketball under head coach Robert Tillman. Tillman was also Johnson's coach in AAU basketball. After high school, he was not recruited by any division one schools to play basketball, so he attended Salt Lake Community College, where he was the team's starting point guard. He averaged eight points and eight assists during his one season there. Following the season, Tillman approached then-University of Alabama-Birmingham head basketball coach Mike Anderson and told him to, "just watch [Johnson] a little bit; get all your players together and play a pickup game and let him guard your point guard." Eventually, as Tillman says in an interview with The Times-Picayune, "They went out there and played, and after it was all over, Mike said he was going to give him a try, but he would have to sit out his first year."

During Hurricane Katrina in 2006, his mother Elise had her house in New Orleans destroyed, but managed to evacuate to Houston, Texas, before joining Carldell in Birmingham, Alabama. Presently, she resides in Houston.

== College career ==
In his first season playing for the UAB Blazers, Johnson started in 22 of 32 games and led the nation in assist–to–turnover ratio, averaging 3.83 assists for every turnover he committed. He finished the season averaging 4.8 points, 1.8 rebounds, and a team-leading 4.3 assists per game. Johnson also finished the season with a total of 137 assists and 71 steals. On March 12, 2004, he achieved his first career double-double, recording 14 points and 11 assists against the DePaul Blue Demons. In his junior season, he played in all 33 of UAB's games, starting 32 of them. For the second straight season, he led the conference in assists-to-turnover ratio. Johnson recorded a season-high of nine assists on two occasions, first against Louisville and then against DePaul. In the DePaul game, he played in a career-high 41 minutes. At season's end, he was named as a nominee for the Bob Cousy Award, given to the nation's top point guard. In his senior season at UAB, he finished with averages of 7.3 points, 3.0 rebounds, 6.3 assists, and 2.6 steals per game.

== Professional career ==
After going undrafted in the 2006 NBA draft, Johnson was selected in the sixth round of the 2006 Continental Basketball Association draft by the Vancouver Dragons. However, he never played for the team. He later signed with Verviers-Pepinster of Belgium for the 2006–07 season. In 32 games with the team, he averaged 4.5 points, 2.2 rebounds, and 2.7 assists per game.

In August 2007, he joined Halcones UV Xalapa of Mexico, where he played three games. In those games, he averaged 15.7 points, 3.3 rebounds, and 5.0 assists.

On November 1, 2007, he was selected in the second round of the 2007 NBA Development League draft by the Austin Toros. Johnson played 49 games for the Toros in the 2007–08 season, averaging 4.1 points, 2.2 rebounds, and 3.6 assists per game.

In August 2008, he joined Halcones UV Córdoba of Mexico but left before appearing in a game for them. In October 2008, he was re-acquired by the Austin Toros. On January 29, 2009, he was waived by the Toros due to injury. After his release, he once again returned to Mexico, signing with the Bravos de Piedras Negras. He played in four games for the team and finished with averages of 10.5 points, 1.8 rebounds, 5.3 assists, and 3.0 steals per game. On February 15, 2009, he was re-acquired by the Toros. He played 47 games in the 2008–09 season and averaged 8.7 points, 3.1 rebounds, and 5.1 assists per game.

In July 2009, Johnson joined the San Antonio Spurs for the 2009 NBA Summer League. In November 2009, he was re-acquired by the Austin Toros. He went on to play in 56 games and averaged 7.0 points, 1.8 rebounds, and 2.9 assists per game.

In July 2010, he re-joined the San Antonio Spurs for the 2010 NBA Summer League. In October 2010, he was again re-acquired by the Toros. He played in 46 games for the team that season and finished with averages of 12.3 points, 4.0 rebounds, 6.0 assists, and 1.5 steals per game.

In November 2011, Johnson was again re-acquired by the Toros. On December 9, 2011, he signed with the New Orleans Hornets. He would make his NBA debut around that time. On February 7, 2012, he was waived by the Hornets. On February 10, 2012, he returned to the Toros.

In September 2012, Johnson signed with the Atlanta Hawks. However, he was later by the Hawks on October 17, 2012.

On February 11, 2014, Johnson was re-acquired by the Austin Toros. On March 15, 2014, he had his highest scoring game of the season, scoring 20 in a loss to the Rio Grande Valley Vipers.

On October 6, 2014, Johnson signed with Toros de Aragua of the Liga Profesional de Baloncesto.

In November 2014, Johnson signed with Valvoline of Mongolia for the 2014–15 season, making history by becoming the first American basketball player to compete in Mongolia.

In March 2016, Johnson joined the Náuticos de Mazatlán of the Mexican Circuito de Baloncesto de la Costa del Pacífico (CIBACOPA) ahead of the 2016 season. He was loaned to the Frayles de Guasave the following month.

== Coaching career ==
For the 2019–20 season, Johnson was added to the coaching staff of the G League's Memphis Hustle as an assistant.

== Career statistics ==
Legend
| GP | Games played | GS | Games started | MPG | Minutes per game |
| FG% | Field goal percentage | 3P% | 3-point field goal percentage | FT% | Free throw percentage |
| RPG | Rebounds per game | APG | Assists per game | SPG | Steals per game |
| BPG | Blocks per game | PPG | Points per game | **Bold** | Career high |

=== NBA ===
| Year | Team | GP | GS | MPG | FG% | 3P% | FT% | RPG | APG | SPG | BPG | PPG |
|---|---|---|---|---|---|---|---|---|---|---|---|---|
| 2011–12 | New Orleans | 15 | 0 | 7.9 | .314 | .267 | .333 | .6 | 1.5 | .5 | .0 | 1.8 |
| Career | | 15 | 0 | 7.9 | .314 | .267 | .333 | .6 | 1.5 | .5 | .0 | 1.8 |

== See also ==
- List of NCAA Division I men's basketball players with 11 or more steals in a game
