= Eric Gaines =

American basketball player

Jonava
- Position: Point guard
- League: LKL

Personal information
- Born: January 19, 2001 (age 25) New Jersey, U.S.
- Listed height: 6 ft 2 in (1.88 m)
- Listed weight: 165 lb (75 kg)

Career information
- High school: Lithonia (Stonecrest, Georgia)
- College: LSU (2020–2022); UAB (2022–2024)
- NBA draft: 2024: undrafted
- Playing career: 2024–present

Career history
- 2024–2025: Maine Celtics
- 2025: Windy City Bulls
- 2026: Ironi Kiryat Ata
- 2026–present: Jonava

Eric Tyshir Gaines Jr. (born January 19, 2001) is an American professional basketball player for Jonava of the Lietuvos krepšinio lyga (LKL). He played college basketball for the LSU Tigers and UAB Blazers.

== Early life and high school career ==
Gaines was born in New Jersey and moved to Lithonia, Georgia, as a child. He first played football but transitioned into basketball. Gaines was taller than his teammates and primarily played as a center but utilised his speed for a playstyle that involved him grabbing a defensive rebound and beating defenders up the court with his dribble.

Gaines attended Lithonia High School where he did not receive much scouting attention during his first two seasons. He developed a reputation for his dunking abilities during his senior year and received comparisons to Ja Morant which Gaines attributes to increasing his recruitment offers. He averaged 18.6 points, 4 assists, and 2.7 steals per game during his senior season. Gaines was selected as the Atlanta Journal-Constitution All-Metro DeKalb County Player of the Year. He was a four-star recruit and committed to playing college basketball for LSU.

== College career ==
Gaines averaged 2.5 points, 1.4 rebounds and 1.2 assists per game during his freshman season with the LSU Tigers. He improved his output to nine points, 3.3 rebounds and 2.9 assists per game during his sophomore season while his 2.1 steals per game led the Southeastern Conference. Gaines was primarily utilised as a distributor and defender with the Tigers. He decided to transfer from the team when head coach Will Wade was fired after the 2021–22 season.

On April 12, 2022, Gaines committed to play for UAB. He averaged 11.5 points, 3.4 rebounds and 4.3 assists per game during the 2022–23 season. Gaines declared for the 2023 NBA draft but withdrew on May 30, 2023.

== Professional career ==
On April 5, 2024, Gaines declared for the 2024 NBA draft, but went undrafted. On October 26, 2024, Gaines was selected by the Maine Celtics in the 2024 NBA G League draft. On January 24, 2025, Gaines was traded to the Windy City Bulls.

On February 25, 2026, Gaines was signed by Ironi Kiryat Ata of the Israeli Basketball Premier League.

== Career statistics ==
Legend
GP	Games played	GS	Games started	MPG	Minutes per game
FG%	Field goal percentage	3P%	3-point field goal percentage	FT%	Free throw percentage
RPG	Rebounds per game	APG	Assists per game	SPG	Steals per game
BPG	Blocks per game	PPG	Points per game	**Bold**	Career high

=== College ===
Year	Team	GP	GS	MPG	FG%	3P%	FT%	RPG	APG	SPG	BPG	PPG
2020–21	LSU	29	1	13.4	.222	.172	.727	1.4	1.2	1.0	.2	2.5
2021–22	LSU	34	8	26.9	.391	.250	**.793**	3.3	2.9	2.1	.5	9.0
2022–23	UAB	**39**	29	29.1	**.394**	**.343**	**.793**	3.4	4.3	1.8	**.6**	11.5
2023–24	UAB	35	**33**	**33.7**	.393	.269	.750	**3.9**	**5.5**	**2.3**	.5	**12.3**
Career		137	71	26.4	.380	.279	.773	3.1	3.6	1.9	.5	9.2
