= Jerod Haase =

American college basketball coach (born 1974)

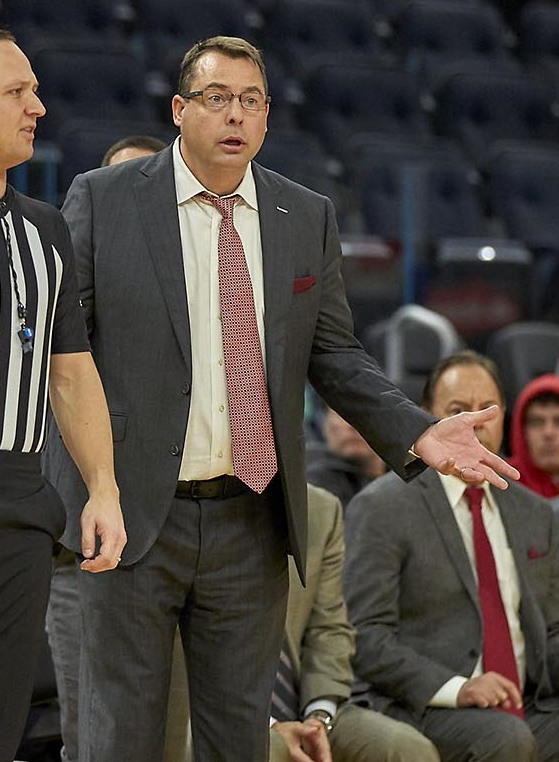
- Haase in 2019

Current position
- Title: Head coach
- Team: UNC Greensboro
- Conference: SoCon
- Record: 0-0

Biographical details
- Born: April 1, 1974 (age 52); South Lake Tahoe, California, U.S.

Playing career
- 1992–1993: California
- 1994–1997: Kansas

Coaching career (HC unless noted)
- 1999–2003: Kansas (assistant)
- 2003–2012: North Carolina (assistant)
- 2012–2016: UAB
- 2016–2024: Stanford
- 2026–present: UNC Greensboro

Head coaching record
- Overall: 206–180 (.534)
- Tournaments: 1–1 (NCAA Division I); 1–2 (NIT)

Accomplishments and honors

Championships
- C-USA regular season (2016); C-USA tournament (2015)

Awards
- C-USA Coach of the Year (2016)
Medal record
Men's basketball
Representing United States
Summer Universiade
Gold medal – first place	1995 Fukuoka	National team

Jerod Albert Haase (born April 1, 1974) is an American college basketball coach and the head men's basketball coach of UNC Greensboro. He was the head coach for Stanford Cardinal men's team of the Pac-12 Conference from 2016 to 2024. Haase played college basketball at the University of California, Berkeley from 1992 to 1993, and then transferred to the University of Kansas to play under Roy Williams from 1994 to 1997. Haase was a Naismith and Wooden Award candidate while at Kansas. At Kansas, he only missed two games out of 101 and averaged 12.5 points per game, scoring 1,246 points over the span of his career. He was a member of the Big Eight all defensive team as a junior, and played at the World University Games in 1995. He then spent 13 years as an assistant under Williams at both Kansas and North Carolina before starting his own head coaching career.

== Early life ==
Born and raised in South Lake Tahoe, California, Haase is one of five siblings, all of whom have played an intercollegiate sport. Haase played high school basketball with long time NBA executive Chris Grant, former general manager of the Cleveland Cavaliers, at South Tahoe High School. Haase and his South Tahoe High School team faced off against their larger rival Western High for the state title in consecutive years, with South Tahoe winning in Haase's senior year in one of the most notable contests in state basketball history.

In Haase's junior year recruiters started to notice his ability, and he was invited to many college showcase camps. Haase attended the Stanford High Potential Camp where he spent time with Stanford guard Kenny Ammon honing his skills and was named the camp MVP. Stanford was one of the first schools to show interest in Haase when he won the Nevada AAA Player of the Year, but during Haase's senior year the University of California, Berkeley expressed major interest in Haase along with former NBA player and current NBA coach Jason Kidd. Haase signed a letter of intent to play for California before his senior season of high school because of the proximity to his home, and he wanted to play in a major conference.

== College career ==
=== California ===
Haase attended the University of California, Berkeley to play during the 1993 season. Haase moved into the starting lineup and averaged 12 points and three assists through the first ten games for the California Golden Bears. During his freshman season at Cal, after a game against USC, Haase got a phone call from his mother saying that she took his father, to the hospital because of an infection near his ankle. Gary Haase went into shock while in the hospital and died right before Haase played a game against UCLA. Later in his freshman season at Cal, his coach Lou Campanelli was fired and interim (and later permanent) coach Todd Bozeman was brought in. Haase was benched and the Bears finished the regular season winning 9 of their last 10 games to reach the NCAA tournament. Haase scored thirteen points in California's upset of powerhouse Duke in the second round. After the season ended with a loss in the Sweet 16 to the University of Kansas, Haase then transferred from California to Kansas.

=== Kansas ===
Haase arrived at Kansas and contributed immediately. During his sophomore season he was named the Big Eight newcomer of the year and a second team all-conference selection. He also led the Jayhawks in scoring with 15.0 points per game. In Haase's junior year he scored his career best 30 points against the Temple Owls. He was also named to the Big Eight all defensive team that year. The Jayhawks went 34–2 in the 1996–97 season, Haase's final year. He was named a co-captain and was in the starting lineup with Jacque Vaughn, Scot Pollard, Raef LaFrentz and Paul Pierce. Haase averaged 12.0 points per game his senior year and was named a Wooden and Naismith award finalist despite playing several games with a broken wrist. Haase's Kansas career came to an end on March 21, 1997, when Kansas lost to the Arizona Wildcats in the NCAA tournament. He started 99 of 101 games with the Jayhawks and his record in three years with the Jayhawks was 89–13. The Jayhawks also won three consecutive conference titles with Haase. The Jayhawks were ranked anywhere from fifth to first in the rankings during Haase's three years, and were named one of the favorites to win the 1996–97 national championship.

== After college career ==
After Haase's senior season he co-wrote a book entitled Floor Burns with author Mark Horvath. The book describes the 1996–1997 season when the Jayhawks were ranked number one for 15 consecutive weeks but lost to Arizona in the NCAA tournament. Haase then had a brief career playing professional basketball in Macedonia. When his short career in Macedonia ended he decided to self-publish his book Floor Burns and revisit towns around Kansas giving instructional basketball camps. Haase visited around 40 towns and conducted over 100 basketball camps. He then decided to turn his focus to coaching.

== Coaching career ==
=== Kansas ===
Haase broke into coaching with his former coach Roy Williams at his former school, Kansas. Haase along with his roommate at Kansas, C.B. McGrath, split time working on the sidelines with Coach Williams or working behind the scenes. Haase spent four years as an assistant to Roy Williams at Kansas before Williams decided to leave Lawrence, Kansas for Chapel Hill, North Carolina and take the North Carolina coaching job.

=== North Carolina ===
Haase followed Williams to North Carolina where he coached under Roy Williams for eight years. Haase had many responsibilities in Chapel Hill including coaching the North Carolina Tar Heels junior varsity basketball team. The Junior Varsity team plays a 14-game schedule against local competition as well as outside programs wanting to give their kids a chance to play in the Dean Smith Center. Haase had to pick 14 students out of a 70-student try-out camp to complete the junior varsity squad. Haase coached the JV team for three years to help prepare him for a head coaching job. Haase won 255 out of 317 games in nine seasons as an assistant coach for Roy Williams, with both Kansas and North Carolina.

=== UAB ===
On March 26, 2012, Haase was named head coach at the University of Alabama at Birmingham (UAB).

Haase managed to get UAB back to the big dance in his third year in Birmingham. The Blazers, a 14 seed, upset third-seeded Iowa State in the 2015 NCAA tournament before losing to UCLA in the round of 32.

His final season saw the Blazers win a conference title, but a loss in the conference tournament relegated them to the NIT.

=== Stanford ===
On March 25, 2016, Haase was named head coach at Stanford University, replacing Johnny Dawkins. In the 2017–18 season, Haase's second as head coach, he led Stanford to 11 conference wins, the most by the Cardinal since 2008.

Haase was fired on March 14, 2024, after eight seasons, zero NCAA tournament appearances, and a 126–127 record.

=== UNC Greensboro ===
On March 18, 2026, Haase was named head coach at the University of North Carolina Greensboro, replacing Mike Jones.

== Personal life ==
Haase married Mindy Meidinger in 1999. In 2006 they had a son, Gavin; in 2009 another son, Garrett; and in 2012 a daughter, Gabrielle.

== Head coaching record ==
Record table
Season	Team	Overall	Conference	Standing	Postseason
UAB Blazers (Conference USA) (2012–2016)
2012–13	UAB	16–17	7–9	T–7th	
2013–14	UAB	18–13	7–9	T–8th	
2014–15	UAB	20–16	12–6	T–4th	NCAA Division I Round of 32
2015–16	UAB	26–7	16–2	1st	NIT First Round
UAB:		80–53 (.602)	42–26 (.618)		
Stanford Cardinal (Pac-12 Conference) (2016–2024)
2016–17	Stanford	14–17	6–12	T–9th	
2017–18	Stanford	19–16	11–7	T–3rd	NIT Second Round
2018–19	Stanford	15–16	8–10	T–8th	
2019–20	Stanford	20–12	9–9	7th	Postseason cancelled
2020–21	Stanford	14–13	10–10	T–6th	
2021–22	Stanford	16–16	8–12	9th	
2022–23	Stanford	14–19	7–12	10th	
2023–24	Stanford	14–18	8–12	T–9th	
Stanford:		126–127 (.498)	67–84 (.444)		
UNC Greensboro (Southern Conference) (2026–present)
2026–27	UNC Greensboro	0–0	0–0		
UNC Greensboro:		0–0 (–)	0–0 (–)		
Total:		206–180 (.534)			
National champion Postseason invitational champion Conference regular season champion Conference regular season and conference tournament champion Division regular season champion Division regular season and conference tournament champion Conference tournament champion
