= Basketball League Belgium =

Basketball org. in Belgium

- Sport: Basketball
- Country: Belgium

The Basketball League Belgium is a governing body for basketball in Belgium. It directs the ten professional Belgian basketball sports clubs of the top-tier Basketball League Belgium Division I.

== See also ==
- Basketball League Belgium Division I
