= Rob Ehsan =

American college basketball coach (born 1982)

Current position
- Title: Head coach
- Team: UIC
- Conference: MVC
- Record: 36–30 (.545)

Biographical details
- Born: May 3, 1982 (age 44); Sacramento, California, U.S.

Playing career
- 2001–2005: UC Davis

Coaching career (HC unless noted)
- 2005–2007: Maryland (GA)
- 2007–2011: Maryland (assistant)
- 2011–2012: Virginia Tech (assistant)
- 2012–2016: UAB (assistant)
- 2016–2020: UAB
- 2021–2024: Stanford (assistant)
- 2024–present: UIC

Head coaching record
- Overall: 112–87 (.563)
- Tournaments: 0–1 (CBI); 0–1 (NIT)

Robert Hassan Ehsan (/ˈiːsɑːn/ EE-sahn; born May 3, 1982) is an American college basketball coach who is currently the head coach for the UIC Flames. From 2016–2020, he was the head men's basketball coach at the University of Alabama at Birmingham (UAB).

A native of Sacramento, California, Ehsan was a four-year player at UC Davis. He was a team captain as a senior in 2005. Ehsan served as an assistant coach at the University of Maryland from 2008 to 2011. When Gary Williams resigned, Ehsan was named interim head coach. He spent a season as an assistant at Virginia Tech before becoming an assistant coach at UAB in 2012.

Ehsan was hired as UAB head coach on April 4, 2016, replacing Jerod Haase. Ehsan took over a team that went 26–7 the year before and lost one senior, Robert Brown. "We strongly believe Rob has the experience and background to build on the already strong foundation he helped establish and take Blazer Basketball to new levels of success," said UAB athletics director Mark Ingram.

Ehsan was fired on March 13, 2020, after compiling a record of 76–57.

On April 27, 2021, Ehsan joined Haase at Stanford University as an assistant coach.

On April 1, 2024, Ehsan was named the head coach at UIC.

== Personal life ==
Ehsan holds a bachelor's degree in economics from UC Davis and an MBA from Maryland. He is married to Lindsey Rattray. They have a daughter, Katelyn, and two sons, Davis and Robert Ryder.

== Head coaching record ==
Record table
Season	Team	Overall	Conference	Standing	Postseason
UAB Blazers (Conference USA) (2016–2020)
2016–17	UAB	17–16	9–9	T–7th	
2017–18	UAB	20–13	10–8	6th	
2018–19	UAB	20–15	10–8	5th	CBI First Round
2019–20	UAB	19–13	9–9	T–7th	
UAB:		76–57 (.571)	38–34 (.528)		
UIC Flames (Missouri Valley Conference) (2024–present)
2024–25	UIC	17–14	10–10	T–5th	
2025–26	UIC	19–16	12–8	T–3rd	NIT First Round
UIC:		36–30 (.545)	22–18 (.550)		
Total:		112–87 (.563)			
