= Cameron Moore (basketball) =

American basketball player (1990–2016)

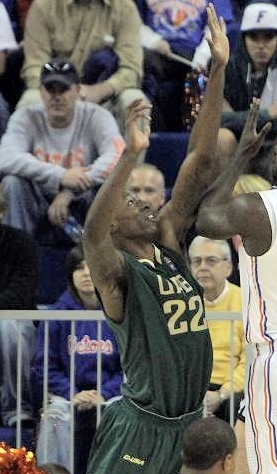

Personal information
- Born: November 12, 1990 Huntsville, Alabama
- Died: October 4, 2016 (aged 25) Ohrid, Republic of Macedonia
- Listed height: 6 ft 10 in (2.08 m)
- Listed weight: 230 lb (104 kg)

Career information
- High school: Theodore Roosevelt (San Antonio, Texas)
- College: UAB (2008–2012)
- NBA draft: 2012: undrafted
- Playing career: 2012–2016
- Position: Power forward / center

Career history
- 2012–2013: Ferro-ZNTU
- 2013–2014: Juvecaserta Basket
- 2014: Reyer Venezia Mestre
- 2015: Bakersfield Jam

Cameron Moore (November 12, 1990 – October 4, 2016) was an American professional basketball player. Standing at 6 ft 10 in (2.08 m), he played at the power forward and center positions. He played college basketball at the University of Alabama at Birmingham.

== Biography ==
After playing high school basketball at Theodore Roosevelt High School, in San Antonio, Texas, Moore played 4 seasons of college basketball at the University of Alabama at Birmingham, with the UAB Blazers. In his senior season at UAB, Moore averaged 16.1 points and 10.5 rebounds, and was named Conference USA Defensive Player of the Year. He was ranked second in UAB history in double-doubles (28) and blocked shots (137), and fourth in total rebounds (747). Moore was one of three UAB players with more than 1,000 points and 700 rebounds in his career.

Moore went undrafted in the 2012 NBA draft. In July 2012, he joined the Los Angeles Clippers for the 2012 NBA Summer League. On July 15, 2012, he signed with Ferro-ZNTU of Ukraine for the 2012–13 season.

In July 2013, Moore joined the New Orleans Pelicans for the 2013 NBA Summer League. On July 23, 2013, he signed with Juvecaserta Basket of Italy for the 2013–14 season.

In July 2014, Moore joined the New York Knicks for the 2014 NBA Summer League. On July 26, 2014, he signed with Reyer Venezia Mestre of Italy for the 2014–15 season. On December 23, 2014, he parted ways with Venezia after averaging 4.7 points and 3.8 rebounds per game in 10 Serie A games. In March 2015, he joined the Bakersfield Jam of the NBA D-League. In late May 2015, he collapsed and spent a few hours in a coma for what was diagnosed as cardiomegaly.

Moore did not play pro basketball in the 2015–16 season. In October 2016, he joined Macedonian club AV Ohrid. On October 4, 2016, he died during his first training with the club.
