= Jordan Walker (basketball) =

American basketball player (born 1999)

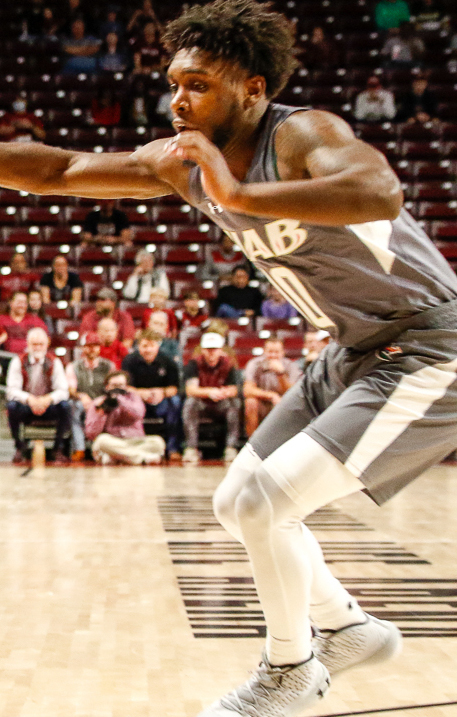
- Walker with UAB in 2021

No. 1 – Maroussi
- Position: Point guard / shooting guard
- League: GBL

Personal information
- Born: August 11, 1999 (age 27) Port Washington, New York, U.S.
- Listed height: 5 ft 11 in (1.80 m)
- Listed weight: 170 lb (77 kg)

Career information
- High school: Long Island Lutheran (Brookville, New York); The Patrick School (Hillside, New Jersey)
- College: Seton Hall (2017–2018); Tulane (2019–2021); UAB (2021–2023)
- NBA draft: 2023: undrafted
- Playing career: 2023–present

Career history
- 2023–2024: Texas Legends
- 2024: Osos de Manatí
- 2024: Hong Kong Bulls
- 2024–2025: Promitheas Patras
- 2025–2026: Rytas Vilnius
- 2026–present: Maroussi

Career highlights
- Conference USA Player of the Year (2022); 2× First-team All-Conference USA (2022, 2023); Conference USA Newcomer of the Year (2022)
- Stats at NBA.com
- Stats at Basketball Reference

Jordan "Jelly" Walker (born August 11, 1999) is an American professional basketball player for Maroussi of the Greek Basketball League (GBL). He played college basketball for the Seton Hall Pirates, Tulane Green Wave and UAB Blazers.

== High school career ==
Walker grew up in Port Washington, New York. He began his high school career at Long Island Lutheran High School. Dissatisfied with the lack of playing time there, he transferred to The Patrick School after his sophomore year. Walker averaged 9.7 points per game for the Celics as a junior. As a senior, he averaged 11.9 points and 4.8 assists per game, leading the team to a 29–4 record and earning First Team All-State honors from NJHoops.com. Walker posted a 31-point, seven-assist performance against Linden High School and helped The Patrick School win the Tournament of Champions.

Walker considered doing a postgraduate season at Montverde Academy, but ultimately remained in the Class of 2017. He committed to playing college basketball for Seton Hall, choosing the Pirates over California, Pittsburgh and UMass.

== College career ==
At Seton Hall, Walker missed several weeks with torn ligaments in his hand as a freshman and averaged 1.8 points per game. Following the season, he transferred to Tulane.

After sitting out a transfer season, Walker averaged eight points, 2.2 rebounds and two assists per game as a redshirt sophomore. As a redshirt junior, he averaged 13 points, 4.3 assists and 1.7 steals per game.

Following the 2020–21 season, Walker transferred to UAB. On February 5, 2022, he scored a UAB program record 42 points in a 97–75 victory over Middle Tennessee State. Walker was named Conference USA Player of the Year as well as Newcomer of the Year. He is the second UAB player to earn Conference USA Player of the Year honors, alongside Aaron Johnson, in 2011. On April 11, 2022, Walker declared for the 2022 NBA draft, while maintaining his college eligibility. On May 12, 2022, Walker withdrew his name from NBA draft consideration. He returned to UAB for the 2022–23 season.

== Professional career ==
=== Texas Legends (2023-2024) ===
After going undrafted in the 2023 NBA draft, Walker joined the Dallas Mavericks for the 2023 NBA Summer League. On August 14, 2023, he signed with the Mavericks, but was waived on October 14. On October 29, he joined the Texas Legends. He averaged 20.0 points, 2.1 rebounds, 5.2 assists, 1.2 steals and scored 41.3% of his three-point shots.

=== Osos de Manatí (2024) ===
On March 29, 2024, Walker signed with the Osos de Manatí of the Baloncesto Superior Nacional. However, he was waived on April 16 after suffering an injury.

=== Promitheas Patras (2024-2025) ===
On October 3, 2024, he signed with Promitheas Patras B.C. of the Greek Basketball League (GBL) and the Basketball Champions League (BCL). On March 19, 2025, while playing for Promitheas Patras B.C., Walker broke the BCL scoring record by getting 54 points in a single game.

=== Rytas Vilnius (2025–2026) ===
On July 27, 2025, Walker signed with Rytas Vilnius of the Lithuanian Basketball League (LKL) and the Basketball Champions League (BCL).

=== Maroussi (2026–present) ===
On February 27, 2026, Walker returned to Greece to play for Maroussi.

== Career statistics ==
Legend
GP	Games played	GS	Games started	MPG	Minutes per game
FG%	Field goal percentage	3P%	3-point field goal percentage	FT%	Free throw percentage
RPG	Rebounds per game	APG	Assists per game	SPG	Steals per game
BPG	Blocks per game	PPG	Points per game	**Bold**	Career high

=== College ===
Year	Team	GP	GS	MPG	FG%	3P%	FT%	RPG	APG	SPG	BPG	PPG
2017–18	Seton Hall	17	0	7.2	.323	.316	.417	.5	.9	.4	**.1**	1.8
2018–19	Tulane	Redshirt										
2019–20	Tulane	30	22	25.9	**.405**	.375	.740	2.2	2.0	**1.7**	.0	8.0
2020–21	Tulane	23	23	**33.5**	.398	.326	.826	2.0	4.3	**1.7**	.0	13.0
2021–22	UAB	**34**	**33**	31.8	.400	**.396**	**.880**	**2.8**	**4.9**	1.5	.0	20.3
2022–23	UAB	33	32	**33.5**	.403	.378	.846	**2.8**	4.2	1.2	.0	**22.3**
Career		137	110	28.1	.400	.377	.830	2.2	3.5	1.4	.0	14.5

=== Domestic leagues ===
Year	Team	League	GP	MPG	FG%	3P%	FT%	RPG	APG	SPG	BPG	PPG
2023-24	(United States) Texas Legends	G League	34	29.5	.425	.407	.838	2.0	5.0	1.1	0.2	15.6
2024	(Puerto Rico) Osos de Manatí	BSN	6	28.7	.352	.205	.850	3.2	4.0	0.5	0	12.5
2024–25	(Greece) Promitheas Patras	GBL	14	27.9	.416	.385	.900	1.6	5.6	0.9	0	18.0

== Personal life ==
Walker earned the nickname "Jelly" after he joined the Jelly Fam collective, a basketball movement founded by Isaiah Washington centered on finger roll layups.

Walker has an undergraduate degree in health and wellness from Tulane University. In an interview he stated "First boy in my family to graduate college.".
