= UAB Blazers men's basketball =

American men's college basketball team

2026–27 UAB Blazers men's basketball team
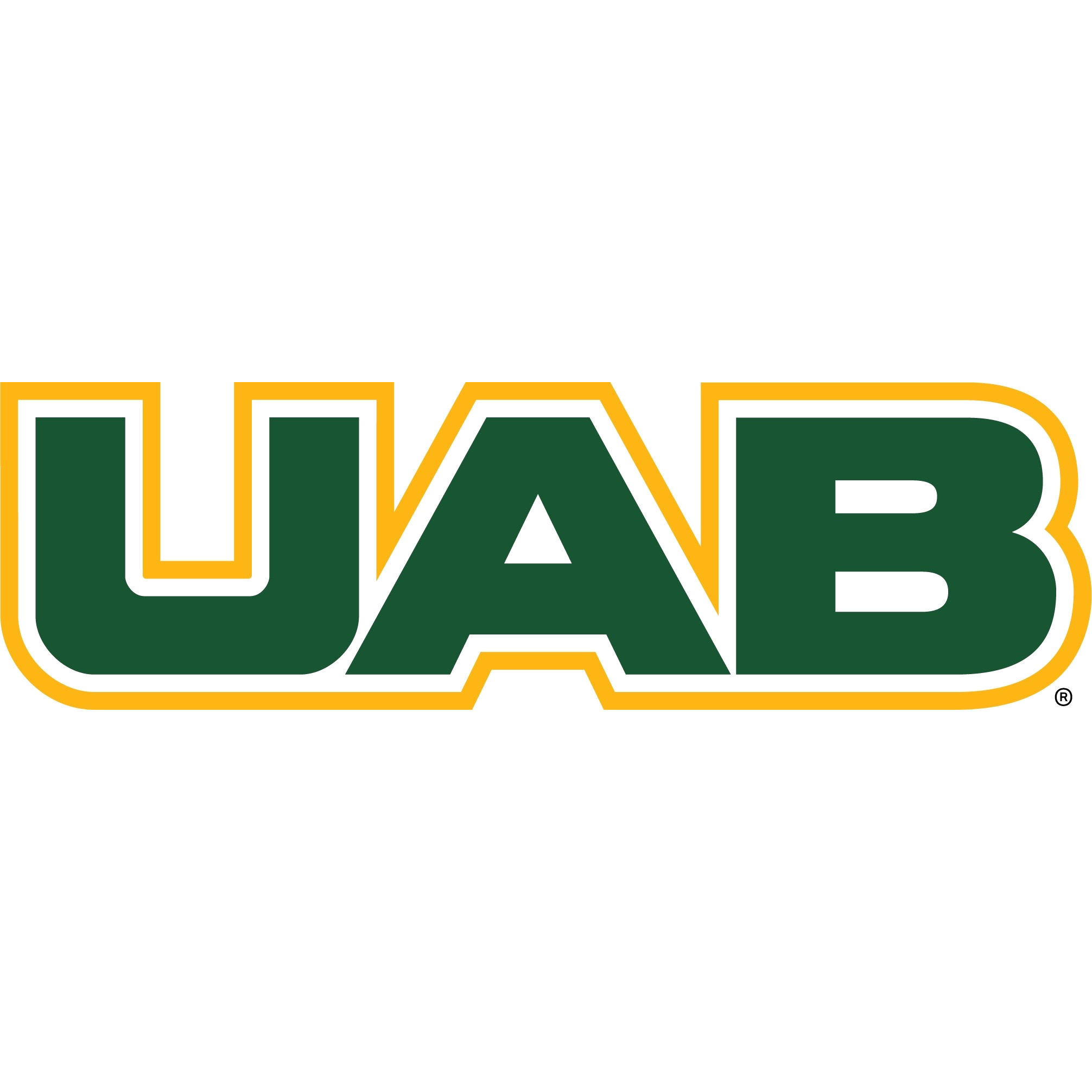
- University: University of Alabama at Birmingham
- Head coach: Andy Kennedy (7th season)
- Location: Birmingham, Alabama
- Arena: Bartow Arena (capacity: 8,508)
- Conference: The American
- Nickname: Blazers
- Colors: UAB Green and UAB Gold
- All-time record: 960–561 (.631)

NCAA Division I tournament Elite Eight
- 1982
Other NCAA Division I tournament results
Sweet Sixteen	1981, 1982, 2004
Appearances	1981, 1982, 1983, 1984, 1985, 1986, 1987, 1990, 1994, 1999, 2004, 2005, 2006, 2011, 2015, 2022, 2024

Conference tournament champions
- 1982, 1983, 1984, 1987, 2015, 2022, 2024

Conference regular-season champions
- 1981, 1982, 1990, 2004, 2011, 2016

Uniforms
Home	Away
Alternate	Alternate

The UAB Blazers men's basketball team represents the University of Alabama at Birmingham (UAB) in NCAA Division I men's college basketball. The Blazers compete as a member of the American Conference and play their home games at Bartow Arena in Birmingham, Alabama. The team is coached by Andy Kennedy. UAB has appeared in the NCAA tournament 17 times, most recently in 2024.

The UAB Blazers started their athletics program with the creation of men's basketball in 1978. Setting high standards from the start, UAB was able to lure Gene Bartow away from his post as the head coach at UCLA to start the Blazer program. Known as the "Father of UAB athletics," Coach Bartow was able to guide the Blazers to early success by reaching the NCAA tournament in just their third season of existence. Since their inaugural season, the Blazers have made 17 appearances in the NCAA men's basketball tournament, and 13 appearances in the National Invitational Tournament. UAB has been productive in its NCAA tournament appearances, reaching the Elite Eight once, and the Sweet Sixteen 3 times. After 46 years of basketball, UAB has had 40 winning seasons, including 29 seasons with at least 20 wins. UAB's win percentage ranks 28th among NCAA Division I basketball programs with at least 40 seasons. UAB's basketball program has featured wins over many of basketball's most historic programs, including Kentucky, North Carolina, Indiana, Louisville, Kansas, Arizona, Michigan State, Virginia, Villanova, Connecticut and many others.

== History ==
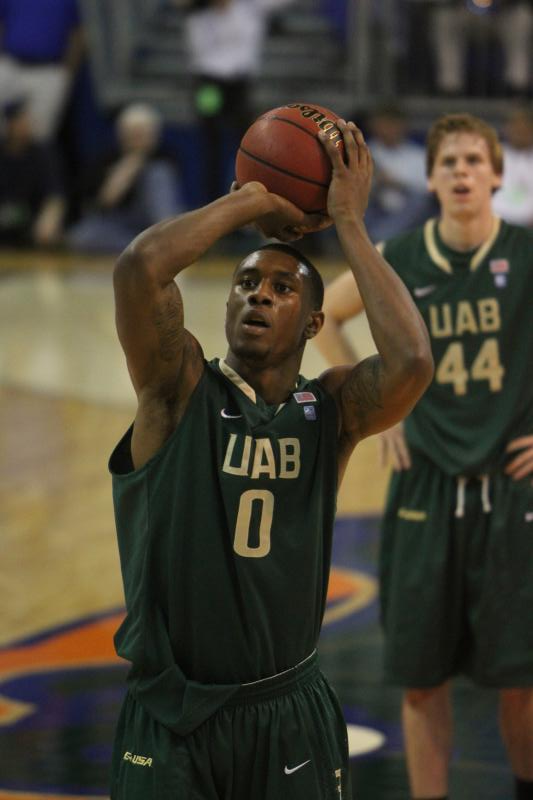
Ovie Soko shooting a free throw for UAB during a game in 2012

=== Gene Bartow era (1978-1996) ===
The UAB men's basketball program was established in 1978 under the leadership of Gene Bartow, who resigned from UCLA to become the university’s inaugural head coach and athletic director. Bartow’s appointment was a pivotal moment in the history of the university, signaling an immediate commitment to national-level athletics.

==== Program Inception and Early Success ====
UAB played its first season in 1978–79 as an independent before joining the Sun Belt Conference in 1979. The program achieved rapid success, securing its first NCAA Tournament berth in 1981. This was followed by a landmark 1981–82 season in which the Blazers reached the Elite Eight. During this tournament run, UAB defeated the defending national champion Indiana Hoosiers and the top-ranked Virginia Cavaliers, the latter led by three-time National Player of the Year Ralph Sampson.

==== The 1980s and Conference Transitions ====
Under Bartow, UAB became a dominant force in the Sun Belt, winning four consecutive conference tournament championships (1982–1985) and seven consecutive NCAA Tournament bids. As the program’s profile grew, Bartow spearheaded shifts into more competitive leagues. In 1991, UAB became a founding member of the Great Midwest Conference, and in 1995, it joined Conference USA.

By the time of his retirement from coaching in 1996, Bartow had compiled a record of 350–193 at UAB. He led the program to nine NCAA Tournament appearances and three NIT berths, establishing a foundation of consistent postseason participation that defined the program's first two decades.

=== Murry Bartow era (1996-2002) ===
Following the retirement of Gene Bartow, the university appointed his son and lead assistant, Murry Bartow, as the second head coach in program history. His tenure coincided with the early, highly competitive years of Conference USA, which at the time included programs such as Cincinnati, Louisville, and Memphis.

Murry Bartow’s coaching tenure was characterized by maintaining the program’s competitive standing within a deep conference field. His most successful season occurred in 1998–99, when the Blazers finished with a 20–12 record and secured a share of the Conference USA regular-season championship. This performance earned the program an at-large bid to the NCAA Tournament, its first of the post-Gene Bartow era. Following a 13–17 finish in the 2001–02 season, the university opted for a change in leadership, marking the end of the Bartow family’s 24-year direct coaching oversight of the program.

=== Mike Anderson era (2002-2006) ===
In 2002, UAB hired, Birmingham native, Mike Anderson as their third head coach. UAB was coming off a 13–17 season and had only one NCAA appearance since 1995. Anderson quickly turned the program around, and his aggressive, fast tempo style of play was nicknamed "fastest 40 minutes in basketball". In his first season Anderson lead the team to 22 wins and a National Invitation Tournament Quarterfinals appearance. Anderson then led the Blazers to three straight appearances in the NCAA men's basketball tournament. In 2004, the Blazers advanced to the Sweet Sixteen by virtue of a 76–75 upset victory over the University of Kentucky, the tournament's overall #1 seed. UAB ended the season ranked 23rd in the USA Today coaches' poll. Anderson was named Conference USA Coach of the Year, and is the only coach in UAB history to take the Blazers to the post season every year of his tenure.

=== Mike Davis era (2006-2012) ===
On April 7, 2006, Mike Davis was hired as the new head coach of the UAB Blazers. Davis replaced Mike Anderson, who left UAB after a successful stint to become the head coach at Missouri. The Blazers finished 15–16 in Davis' first season at the helm, earning a 9th seed in the Conference USA tournament and losing to 8th seed Marshall 53–52 in the first round. UAB subsequently failed to qualify for the NCAA men's basketball tournament, ending the Blazers' three-year streak of appearances in the NCAA post-season and causing some to question whether Davis was the right man for the job.

Despite several injuries and academic casualties in Davis's second year at UAB, Davis led the Blazers to a 22–9 regular season record and a 2nd-place finish in Conference USA. The Blazers narrowly missed making the NCAA men's basketball tournament and instead were rewarded with an appearance in the NIT.

On April 24, 2007, the University Board of Trustees rewarded Davis with a 2-year contract extension. The extended contract ran through and the 2012–13 season featured a base salary that was increased to $625,000 from $600,000 annually. He was also eligible for increased incentives, including $35,000 for taking UAB to the NCAA Tournament, $75,000 each for a Sweet 16 appearance and a Final Four appearance and $100,000 for appearing in the national championship game. The buyout clause in the contract was increased from $500,000 to $625,000. This contract is fully guaranteed. On March 16, 2012, after a 15–16 record (9–7 in Conference USA) Davis was fired as the head basketball coach at UAB due to "poor ticket sales and attendance" as well as waning fan support and a history of disappointing performances in postseason action.

=== Jerod Haase era (2012-2016) ===
On March 26, 2012, UAB hired Jerod Haase as the fifth UAB Men's basketball coach.

Haase managed to get UAB back to the big dance in his third year in Birmingham. The Blazers, a 14 seed, upset third-seeded Iowa State in the 2015 NCAA tournament before losing to UCLA in the round of 32.

His final season saw the Blazers win a conference title, but a loss in the conference tournament relegated them to the NIT. On March 25, 2016, Haase was named head coach at Stanford University.

=== Rob Ehsan era (2016-2020) ===
Rob Ehsan was hired as UAB head coach on April 4, 2016, replacing Jerod Haase. Ehsan took over a team that went 26–7 the year before and lost one senior, Robert Brown. "We strongly believe Rob has the experience and background to build on the already strong foundation he helped establish and take Blazer Basketball to new levels of success," said UAB athletics director Mark Ingram.

Ehsan was fired on March 13, 2020, after compiling a record of 76–57.

=== Andy Kennedy era (2020-present) ===
On March 20, 2020, Andy Kennedy was hired as the head coach at UAB, his alma mater. In his inaugural season, he led the Blazers to a 22–7 record, marking the most wins by a first-year head coach in program history. The team finished the season ranked fourth nationally in scoring defense and turnover margin. Kennedy’s second season in 2021–22 saw further progression as the Blazers set a then-school record for wins with a 27–8 record. Led by Conference USA Player of the Year Jordan Walker, UAB won the C-USA tournament and secured its first NCAA tournament appearance since 2015.

The program continued its upward trajectory during the 2022–23 season, setting a new program record with 29 wins. During this campaign, UAB reached the NIT final for the first time in school history and recorded three victories over SEC opponents. In 2023–24, the program’s first year in the American Conference (AC), Kennedy led the Blazers to a 23–12 record and an AC tournament championship, resulting in a second NCAA tournament berth in three years. This season was highlighted by the performance of Yaxel Lendeborg, who was named the AAC Defensive Player of the Year and a First-Team All-AAC selection. During this season, Kennedy became the fastest coach in UAB history to reach the 100-win milestone, doing so in 136 games.

Kennedy’s later tenure has been defined by unprecedented consistency and milestones. By the 2025–26 season, he had led the Blazers to six consecutive 20-win seasons and six straight top-four conference finishes, both program records. The 2025–26 team achieved a perfect 9–0 road record in AC play and set a school record with 10 consecutive road wins. Over his first six seasons, Kennedy amassed 145 wins, the winningest six-year stretch in UAB history. During this period, Kennedy also surpassed the 400-career win milestone and became the second-winningest coach in the history of the Blazers' program.

== Conference affiliations ==
- 1978–79 – NCAA Division I Independent
- 1979–80 to 1990–91 – Sun Belt Conference
- 1991–92 to 1994–95 – Great Midwest Conference
- 1995–96 to 2022–23 – Conference USA
- 2023–24 to present – American Conference

== UAB head coaches ==
UAB men's basketball coaches
Coach	Years	Wins–losses	NCAA tournament appearances
Gene Bartow	1978–1996	366–203 (.643)	9
Murry Bartow	1996–2002	103–83 (.554)	1
Mike Anderson	2002–2006	89–41 (.685)	3
Mike Davis	2006–2012	122–73 (.626)	1
Jerod Haase	2012– 2016	80–53 (.602)	1
Rob Ehsan	2016–2020	76–57 (.571)	0
Andy Kennedy	2020–present	145-62 (.700)	2
Overall	45 seasons	981-572 (.632)	17

== UAB season-by-season records ==
This is a list of seasons completed by the Blazers.

Record table
Season	Coach	Overall	Conference	Standing	Postseason
UAB (Independent) (1978–1979)
1978–79	Gene Bartow	15–11			
UAB (Sun Belt Conference) (1979–1991)
1979–80	Gene Bartow	18–12	10–4	T–2nd	NIT First Round
1980–81	Gene Bartow	23–9	9–3	T–1st	NCAA Sweet 16
1981–82	Gene Bartow	25–6	9–1	1st	NCAA Elite 8
1982–83	Gene Bartow	19–14	9–5	3rd	NCAA First Round
1983–84	Gene Bartow	23–11	8–6	5th	NCAA First Round
1984–85	Gene Bartow	25–9	11–3	2nd	NCAA Second Round
1985–86	Gene Bartow	25–11	9–5	T–3rd	NCAA Second Round
1986–87	Gene Bartow	21–11	10–4	3rd	NCAA First Round
1987–88	Gene Bartow	16–15	7–7	5th	
1988–89	Gene Bartow	22–12	8–6	4th	NIT Semifinals
1989–90	Gene Bartow	22–9	12–2	1st	NCAA First Round
1990–91	Gene Bartow	18–13	9–5	2nd	NIT First Round
UAB (Great Midwest Conference) (1991–1995)
1991–92	Gene Bartow	20–9	4–6	5th	NIT First Round
1992–93	Gene Bartow	21–14	5–5	4th	NIT Semifinals
1993–94	Gene Bartow	22–8	8–4	T–2nd	NCAA First Round
1994–95	Gene Bartow	15–15	5–7	6th	
UAB (Conference USA) (1995–2023)
1995–96	Gene Bartow	16–14	6–8	2nd (Red)	
1996–97	Murry Bartow	18–14	7–7	2nd (Red)	NIT First Round
1997–98	Murry Bartow	21–12	10–6	2nd (National)	NIT Second Round
1998–99	Murry Bartow	20–12	10–6	1st (National)	NCAA First Round
1999–2000	Murry Bartow	14–14	7–9	T–3rd (National)	
2000–01	Murry Bartow	17–14	8–8	4th (National)	
2001–02	Murry Bartow	13–17	6–10	T–4th (National)	
2002–03	Mike Anderson	21–13	8–8	T–2nd (National)	NIT Quarterfinals
2003–04	Mike Anderson	22–10	12–4	T–1st	NCAA Sweet 16
2004–05	Mike Anderson	22–11	10–6	T–4th	NCAA Second Round
2005–06	Mike Anderson	24–7	12–2	2nd	NCAA First Round
2006–07	Mike Davis	15–16	7–9	T–8th	
2007–08	Mike Davis	23–11	12–4	2nd	NIT Second Round
2008–09	Mike Davis	22–12	11–5	3rd	NIT First Round
2009–10	Mike Davis	25–9	11–5	T–3rd	NIT Quarterfinals
2010–11	Mike Davis	22–9	12–4	1st	NCAA First Four
2011–12	Mike Davis	15–16	9–7	T–5th	
2012–13	Jerod Haase	16–17	7–9	T–7th	
2013–14	Jerod Haase	18–13	7–9	T–8th	
2014–15	Jerod Haase	20–16	12–6	T–4th	NCAA Second Round
2015–16	Jerod Haase	26–7	16–2	1st	NIT First Round
2016–17	Rob Ehsan	17–16	9–9	7th	
2017–18	Rob Ehsan	20–13	10–8	6th	
2018–19	Rob Ehsan	20–15	10–8	5th	CBI first round
2019–20	Rob Ehsan	19–13	9–9	7th	
2020–21	Andy Kennedy	22–7	13–5	2nd (West)	
2021–22	Andy Kennedy	27–8	14–4	2nd (West)	NCAA First Round
2022-23	Andy Kennedy	29–10	14–6	3rd	NIT Runner–up
UAB (American Conference) (2023–present)
2023–24	Andy Kennedy	23–12	12–6	4th	NCAA First Round
2024–25	Andy Kennedy	24–13	13–5	3rd	NIT Quarterfinals
2025–26	Andy Kennedy	20–12	11–7	4rd	
Total:		961–560			
National champion Postseason invitational champion Conference regular season champion Conference regular season and conference tournament champion Division regular season champion Division regular season and conference tournament champion Conference tournament champion

== Postseason Results ==
=== NCAA tournament results ===
UAB has appeared in 17 NCAA Tournaments, with a combined record of 10–17.

Year	Seed	Round	Opponent	Result
1981	#7	First Round; Second Round; Sweet Sixteen	Western Kentucky; Kentucky; Indiana	W 93–68; W 69–62; L 72–87
1982	#4	Second Round; Sweet Sixteen; Elite Eight	Indiana; Virginia; Louisville	W 80–70; W 68–66; L 68–75
1983	#10	First Round	Oklahoma	L 63–71
1984	#9	First Round	BYU	L 68–84
1985	#7	First Round; Second Round	Michigan State; Memphis State	W 67–55; L 66–67^{OT}
1986	#6	First Round; Second Round	Missouri; North Carolina	W 66–64; L 59–77
1987	#11	First Round	Providence	L 68–90
1990	#10	First Round	UCLA	L 56–68
1994	#7	First Round	George Washington	L 46–51
1999	#12	First Round	Iowa	L 64–77
2004	#9	First Round; Second Round; Sweet Sixteen	Washington; Kentucky; Kansas	W 102–100; W 76–74; L 74–100
2005	#11	First Round; Second Round	LSU; Arizona	W 82–68; L 63–85
2006	#9	Round of 64	Kentucky	L 64–69
2011	#12	First Four	Clemson	L 52–70
2015	#14	First Round; Second Round	Iowa State; UCLA	W 60–59; L 75–92
2022	#12	Round of 64	Houston	L 68–82
2024	#12	Round of 64	San Diego State	L 65–69

=== NIT results ===
UAB has appeared in the National Invitation Tournament 14 times, with a combined record of 20–14.

Year	Round	Opponent	Result
1980	First Round	Southwestern Louisiana	L 74–72
1989	First Round; Second Round; Quarterfinals; Semifinals; Third Place Game	Georgia Southern; Richmond; Connecticut; St. John's; Michigan State	W 83–74; W 64–61; W 85–79; L 65–76; W 78–76
1991	First Round	Memphis State	L 76–82
1992	First Round	Tennessee	L 68–71
1993	First Round; Second Round; Quarterfinals; Semifinals; Third Place Game	Alabama; Clemson; SW Missouri State; Georgetown; Providence	W 58–56; W 65–64; W 61–52; L 41–45; W 55–52
1997	First Round	TCU	L 62–85
1998	First Round; Second Round	Missouri; Minnesota	W 93–86; L 66–79
2003	First Round; Second Round; Quarterfinals	Louisiana–Lafayette; Siena; St. John's	W 82–80; W 80–71; L 71–79
2008	First Round; Second Round	VCU; Virginia Tech	W 80–77; L 49–75
2009	First Round	Notre Dame	L 64–70
2010	First Round; Second Round; Quarterfinals	Coastal Carolina; NC State; North Carolina	W 65–49; W 72–52; L 55–60
2016	First Round	BYU	L 79–97
2023	First Round; Second Round; Quarterfinals; Semifinals; Final	Southern Miss; Morehead State; Vanderbilt; Utah Valley; North Texas	W 88–60; W 77–59; W 67–59; W 88–86^{OT} L 61–68
2025	First Round; Second Round; Quarterfinals	Saint Joseph's; Santa Clara; UC Irvine	W 69–65; W 88–84; L 77–81^{OT}

=== CBI Results ===
The Blazers have appeared in the College Basketball Invitational (CBI) one time. Their record is 0–1

Year	Round	Opponent	Result
2019	First Round	Brown	L 78–83

=== Highest Seeds Beaten in NCAA tournament ===
Year	Seed	Opponent	Result/Score
2004	1	Kentucky	W 76–74
1982	1	Virginia	W 68–66
1981	2	Kentucky	W 69–62
2015	3	Iowa State	W 60–59

== UAB Rivalry Games ==
=== University of Memphis ===
UAB's primary rival is Memphis, a fellow member of the American Conference. The rivalry began in 1984, when the two schools first met in men's basketball. Memphis currently leads the series at 44–13. The rivalry is anchored by the legacy of Gene Bartow, who led Memphis, then Memphis State, to the 1973 National Championship game before resigning from UCLA in 1977 to found the UAB athletic department and serve as the Blazers' inaugural head coach. On February 22, 2026 UAB snapped an 18-game road losing streak by defeating Memphis 78-67 at the FedExForum. UAB's first win in Memphis since 1999.

=== University of North Texas ===
The matchup with North Texas has gained prominence in multiple sports, particularly following both programs’ membership in Conference USA and the American Conference. The series received national attention in men’s basketball when the two teams competed in the 2023 NIT Championship game. This marked a rare instance of conference opponents meeting for a national postseason title. UAB currently leads the series 12-9.

=== Auburn University ===
In men’s basketball, UAB maintains an in-state rivalry with Auburn Tigers men's basketball, who holds the series lead at 11–10 after winning six straight. The rivalry was on hiatus for several years before a four-game series beginning in 2015, and has been dormant again since 2018.

=== Series records against frequent opponents ===
Series records against frequent opponents
Rival	First meeting	Last meeting	Overall record
Auburn	1982	2018	Auburn leads 11–10
Charlotte	1980	2026	UAB leads 36–21
Memphis	1984	2026	Memphis leads 44–13
Middle Tennessee	1986	2025	UAB leads 19–12
North Texas	1997	2026	UAB leads 12–9
Old Dominion	1983	2022	UAB leads 23–16
South Alabama	1978	2025	UAB leads 32–14
South Florida	1978	2026	UAB leads 44–22
Southern Mississippi	1979	2024	UAB leads 38–20
Western Kentucky	1981	2023	UAB leads 27–18

== Awards ==
=== Conference Coach of the Year ===
Year	Conference	Coach
2004	Conference USA	Mike Anderson
2011	Conference USA	Mike Davis
2016	Conference USA	Jerod Haase

=== Conference Player of the Year ===
Year	Conference	Position	Player
1982	Sun Belt	SG	Oliver Robinson
2011	Conference USA	PG	Aaron Johnson
2022	Conference USA	PG	Jordan Walker

=== All--Conference Players Since 2012 ===
Year	Conference	Team	Position	Player
2012	Conference USA	1st	Forward	Cameron Moore
2013	Conference USA	2nd	Forward	Rod Rucker
2014	Conference USA	1st	Guard	Chad Frazier
2015	Conference USA	3rd	Guard	Robert Brown
2016	Conference USA	2nd	Forward	Chris Cokley
2016	Conference USA	3rd	Guard	Nick Norton
2016	Conference USA	1st	Guard	Robert Brown
2016	Conference USA	3rd	Forward	William Lee
2017	Conference USA	2nd	Forward	William Lee
2018	Conference USA	1st	Forward	Chris Cokley
2019	Conference USA	3rd	Guard	Zack Bryant
2021	Conference USA	2nd	Guard	Tavin Lovan
2022	Conference USA	1st	Guard	Jordan Walker
2022	Conference USA	3rd	Guard	Quan Jackson
2023	Conference USA	1st	Guard	Jordan Walker
2023	Conference USA	3rd	Center	Trey Jemison
2024	American	1st	Forward	Yaxel Lendeborg
2025	American	1st	Forward	Yaxel Lendeborg
2025	American	2nd	Guard	Alejandro Vasquez
2026	American	2nd	Guard	Chance Westry

== Blazers of Note ==
=== Retired numbers ===
UAB has retired four jersey numbers since its inception and they now hang from the rafters of Bartow Arena. This honor is bestowed only on players who earn AP All-America honors and who complete their degree at UAB.

UAB Blazers retired numbers
No.	Player	Career	Ref.
1	Aaron Johnson	2007–2011	
14	Steve Mitchell	1982–1986	
20	Oliver Robinson	1978–1982	
40	Jerome Mincy	1982–1986	

=== In the NBA ===
UAB has seen numerous players move on to professional careers in the NBA. Some of UAB's highest NBA draft picks include:

- Oliver Robinson (2nd Round/1st Pick/24th Overall) to the San Antonio Spurs
- Walter Sharpe (2nd Round/2nd Pick/32nd Overall) to the Seattle SuperSonics
- Steve Mitchell (2nd Round/12th Pick/36th Overall) to the Washington Bullets
- Robert Vaden (2nd Round/54th Overall) to the Charlotte Bobcats

Other former Blazers to play in the NBA are:

- McKinley Singleton (New York Knicks – 1986–87)
- Alan Ogg (Miami Heat – 1990–92; Milwaukee Bucks – 1992–93; Washington Bullets – 1992–93)
- Stanley Jackson (Minnesota Timberwolves – 1993–94)
- Donell Taylor (Washington Wizards – 2005–07)
- Carldell "Squeaky" Johnson (New Orleans Hornets – 2011–12)
- Elijah Millsap (Utah Jazz – 2015)
- Jordan Walker (Dallas Mavericks 2023–Present)
- Trey Jemison (New Orleans Pelicans 2023) (Washington Wizards 2024)(Memphis Grizzlies 2024–Present

=== In international leagues ===
- Paul Delaney (class of 2004), basketball player in the Israeli National League

== UAB Basketball facilities ==
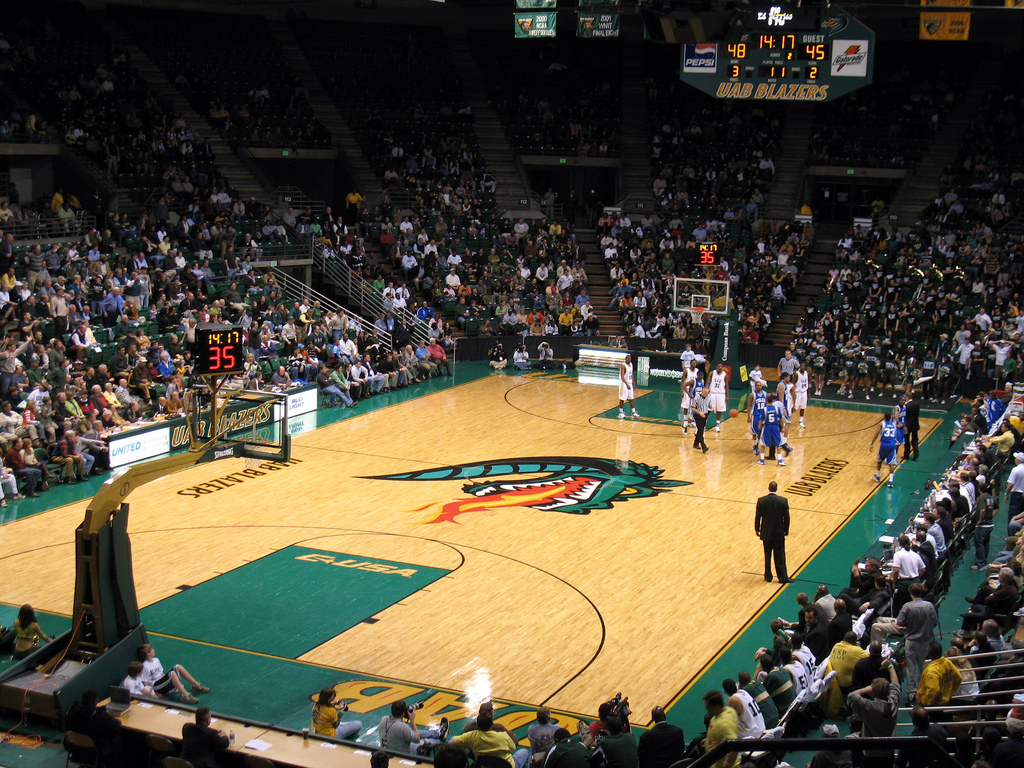
UAB vs Tulsa at Bartow Arena

=== Bartow Arena ===
UAB moved their home games to an on-campus facility starting with the 1988–89 season. Originally known as UAB Arena, the name was officially changed to Bartow Arena on January 25, 1997. The 8,508-seat arena is named after Coach Gene Bartow. In 2026 the arena will undergo a $15.4 Million renovation that will expand the lobby, add a premium club, and provide student seating along the sideline.

=== Basketball Practice Facility ===
UAB’s basketball practice facility, housed in a renovated 35,000-square-foot Physical Education Building, serves the men’s and women’s basketball programs. It includes two full-length practice courts, locker rooms, player lounges, film rooms, workout rooms, and coaching offices.

=== BJCC Arena ===
The BJCC Arena was home of the UAB men's basketball team before it moved into Bartow Arena in 1988.

Top 10 Home Games at BJCC
	Opponent	Attendance
1	DePaul (1980)	17,309
2	DePaul (1985)	17,222
3	Auburn (1984)	17,025
4	Indiana (1997)	16,982
5	Virginia Commonwealth (1985)	16,866
6	Auburn (1986)	16,815
7	Auburn (1983)	16,803
8	Auburn (1982)	16,797
9	South Florida (1985)	16,781
10T	Virginia (1982)	16,754
10T	Louisville (1982)	16,754

Top 10 Home Games at Bartow Arena
	Opponent	Attendance
1	Memphis (2008)	9,392
2	Louisville (2005)	9,354
3	Cincinnati (2004)	9,312
4	Cincinnati (2000)	9,279
5	Cincinnati (1996)	9,213
6	Memphis (2009)	9,153
7	Memphis (2011)	9,119
8	Alcorn State (1989)	9,010
9	Arkansas (1990)	8,951
10	Cincinnati (1994)	8,907
