= Aaron Johnson (basketball) =

American basketball player (born 1988)

Personal information
- Born: October 27, 1988 (age 38) Englewood, Illinois, U.S.
- Listed height: 5 ft 8 in (1.73 m)
- Listed weight: 175 lb (79 kg)

Career information
- High school: Hubbard (Chicago, Illinois)
- College: UAB (2007–2011)
- NBA draft: 2011: undrafted
- Playing career: 2011–2018
- Position: Point Guard

Career history
- 2011–2012: Ostuni
- 2012–2013: Vanoli Cremona
- 2013–2014: Bakersfield Jam
- 2014: Reyer Venezia
- 2014–2015: Bisons Loimaa
- 2015–2016: SCM CSU Craiova
- 2016–2018: Stal Ostrów Wielkopolski

Career highlights
- All-PLK Team (2018); NCAA assists leader (2011); Conference USA Player of the Year (2011); No. 1 retired by UAB Blazers

Aaron Westley Johnson (born October 27, 1988) is an American professional basketball player for Stal Ostrów Wielkopolski of the Polish Basketball League. He played college basketball for UAB. As a senior in 2010–11, he led NCAA Division I in assists with 7.70 per game. In addition, he was named Conference USA Men's Basketball Player of the Year.

== Early life ==
Johnson was born and raised in the Englewood area of Chicago. He is the fourth-born child of 12. Despite a rough childhood, Johnson became the first in his family to attend college and graduate.

== High school career ==
Johnson played high school basketball at Hubbard High School where he was a four-year starter. As a junior he averaged 21 points and nine assists per game, although the team finished with an 11–14 record. The following year, however, Johnson led Hubbard to a 21–9 record while winning the regional championship. He achieved all-city honors after averaging 14 points and nine assists per game. Johnson was also rated as one of the top 25 players in the state of Illinois according to Rivals.com.

== College career ==
Johnson played college ball for University of Alabama at Birmingham. During the 2009–10 season he was named to the third team all Conference USA and first team all defense. Johnson's best season was his senior year, where he averaged 11.8 points and an NCAA-leading 7.7 assists per game. He led UAB to a 22–9 overall record (12–4 conference) as they won their first outright C-USA regular season title. Johnson also became the first player in UAB history to earn Conference USA Player of the Year honors and an All-American honorable mention. He also was named to the first team all-conference, first team all-defense, and District 11 Second Team.

Johnson's best game came in a triple overtime win against the conference favorite UTEP. He ended the game with 26 points on 9–17 shooting, 14 assists, seven rebounds and 1 steal in 54 minutes of playing time. He also tallied a career best 39 points, four assists and four rebounds in a conference playoff loss to East Carolina. During his last game as a college player, Johnson fractured his fibula. He finished his career at UAB as its all-time leader in assists for a career (664), single season (239), double-figures in a game (10), single season average (7.70) and single game (14). Johnson also finished second in Conference USA history in career assists.

=== College statistics ===
College	Year	GP	GS	SPG	RPG	APG	PPG	FG%	3P%	FT%
UAB	2007–08	34	26	1.0	1.7	4.1	5.2	.436	.305	.781
UAB	2008–09	34	17	1.1	1.5	3.6	3.6	.392	.324	.660
UAB	2009–10	34	34	1.6	2.5	4.8	9.6	.458	.372	.732
UAB	2010–11	31	31	1.5	2.8	7.7	11.8	.419	.247	.779
Career		133	108	1.3	2.1	5.0	7.5	.430	.308	.751

== Professional career ==
Following the close of his collegiate career, Johnson signed with Ostuni Basket of Italy's second division (Legadue Basket). In his first professional year Johnson averaged 15.0 points, 2.4 rebounds, 4.5 assist, 3.7 turnovers, and 1.5 steals while shooting 55% from 2 point field goal range and 33% from 3 along the way to being named to the Legadue SuisseGas All-Star Game. Johnson increased his scoring average in the playoffs to 22.3, which was good for 2nd in the league.

On July 19, 2012, Johnson signed with Vanoli Cremona in Italy's A-1 league.

In November 2013, he was acquired by the Bakersfield Jam. On January 23, 2014, he was waived by the Jam.

For the 2014–15 season Johnson signed with the Finnish team Nilan Bisons Loimaa.

On September 15, 2015, Johnson signed with Romanian team SCM CSU Craiova. On July 17, 2016, Johnson signed with Polish team Stal Ostrów Wielkopolski.

=== Professional statistics ===
professional	Year	GP	GS	PPG	RPG	APG	SPG	2FG%	3P%	FT%
Assi Ostuni	2011–12	31	31	15.0	2.4	4.5	1.5	.55	.33	.747
Career		31	31	15.0	2.4	4.5	1.5	.55	.33	.747
