= Trey Jemison =

American basketball player (born 1999)

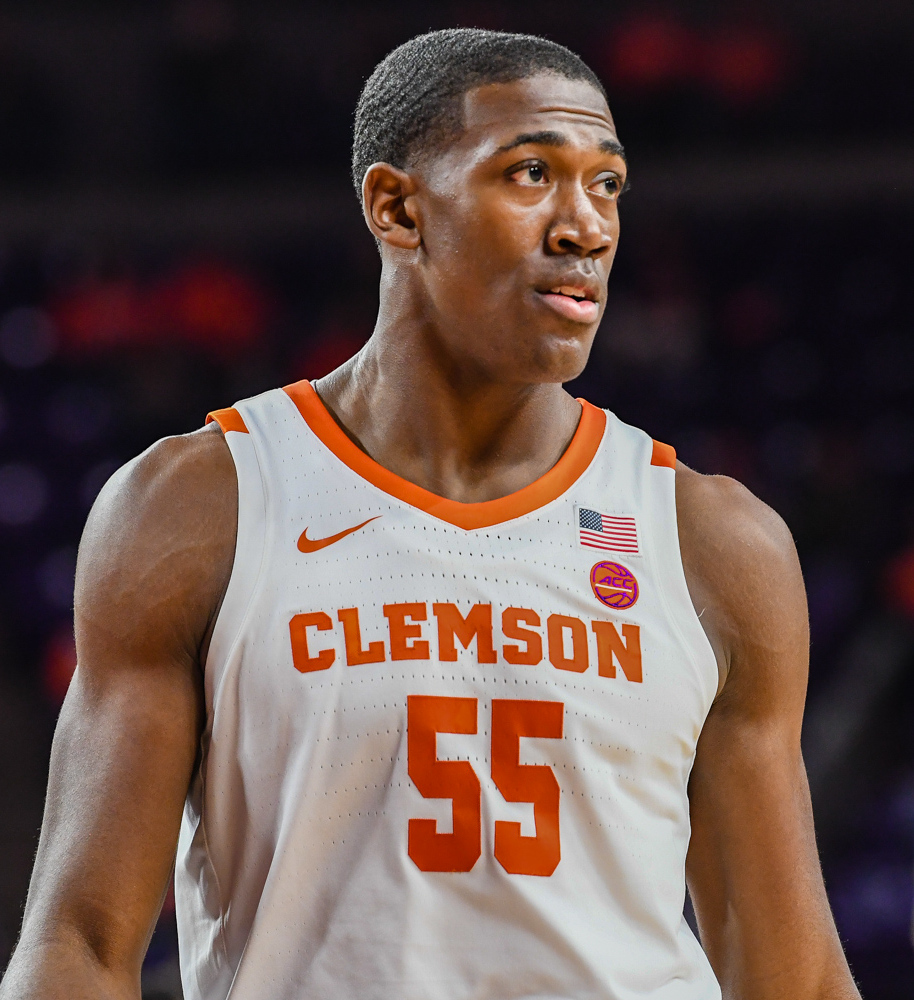
- Jemison with Clemson in 2019

No. 50 – Raptors 905
- Position: Center
- League: NBA G League

Personal information
- Born: November 28, 1999 (age 26) Birmingham, Alabama, U.S.
- Listed height: 6 ft 10 in (2.08 m)
- Listed weight: 270 lb (122 kg)

Career information
- High school: Ramsay (Birmingham, Alabama); Homewood (Homewood, Alabama); Hoover (Hoover, Alabama)
- College: Clemson (2018–2020); UAB (2020–2023)
- NBA draft: 2023: undrafted
- Playing career: 2023–present

Career history
- 2023–2024: Birmingham Squadron
- 2024: Washington Wizards
- 2024: Memphis Grizzlies
- 2024–2025: New Orleans Pelicans
- 2024–2025: →Birmingham Squadron
- 2025: Los Angeles Lakers
- 2025: →South Bay Lakers
- 2025–2026: New York Knicks
- 2025–2026: →Westchester Knicks
- 2026–present: Raptors 905

Career highlights
- NBA champion (2026); NBA Cup champion (2025); Third-team All-Conference USA (2023); 2× Conference USA All-Defensive team (2021, 2023)
- Stats at NBA.com
- Stats at Basketball Reference

Richard Lee "Trey" Jemison III (born November 28, 1999) is an American professional basketball player for the Raptors 905 of the NBA G League. He played college basketball for the Clemson Tigers and UAB Blazers. Jemison won an NBA championship with the Knicks in 2026.

== High school career ==
Jemison was raised in Birmingham, Alabama. He spent his freshman year at Ramsay High School. He transferred to Homewood High School for his sophomore year where he was a member of the team that won the 2016 Alabama 6A state championship. Jemison transferred to Hoover High School for his senior year when his mother was hired by the school. He averaged 19 points, 15 rebounds and 5 blocks per game as a senior and was named all-state honorable mention.

Jemison was rated as a three-star prospect. He committed to play college basketball for the Clemson Tigers over offers from the Harvard Crimson and Alabama Crimson Tide.

== College career ==
Jemison played 20 games for the Tigers as a freshman. He played in 30 games for the Tigers during his sophomore season but only averaged 8.4 minutes per game. Jemison decided to enter the transfer portal on May 6, 2020, and committed to join his hometown team, the UAB Blazers, on May 14, 2020. The NCAA granted Jemison immediate eligibility for the 2020–21 season.

As a junior with the Blazers, Jemison helped lead the Blazers to the sixth-best scoring defense in the NCAA. He was named to the Conference USA All-Defensive team in 2021.

Jemison led the Blazers in total rebounds (252) and blocks (52) during the 2021–22 season. He committed to return to the Blazers for his fifth year of eligibility during the 2022–23 season. During his time with the Blazers, he was affectionately given the nickname “Mr. Birmingham” by UAB Head Coach Andy Kennedy due to his dedication to the institution and the city.

Jemison averaged 9.1 points and 8.4 rebounds per game as a senior. His 329 rebounds set a single-season record for the Blazers. Jemison was selected to the All-Conference USA third-team and All-Defensive team in 2023.

== Professional career ==
=== Birmingham Squadron (2023–2024) ===
After going undrafted in the 2023 NBA draft, Jemison joined the Phoenix Suns for the 2023 NBA Summer League. On September 30, 2023, he signed with the New Orleans Pelicans, but was waived on October 22. Eight days later, he joined the Birmingham Squadron, the Pelicans affiliate in the NBA G League.

=== Washington Wizards (2024) ===
On January 20, 2024, Jemison signed with the Washington Wizards on a 10-day contract. He appeared in two games with the Wizards and recorded one rebound and one turnover in two minutes of playing time.

=== Memphis Grizzlies (2024) ===
After his contract expired on January 30, Jemison signed a 10-day contract with the Memphis Grizzlies. He registered his first NBA points with a five-point performance against the Cleveland Cavaliers on February 2. Jemison was moved into the Grizzlies starting line-up on February 4, tallying six points, four rebounds and two blocks against the Boston Celtics. On February 6, he recorded a career-high 12 points and 6 rebounds in a game against the New York Knicks, and three days later, he signed a two-way contract with the Grizzlies. On March 12, he recorded another career high with 24 points against the Washington Wizards. On July 24, he was waived by the Grizzlies.

=== New Orleans Pelicans / Birmingham Squadron (2024–2025) ===
On July 26, 2024, Jemison's two-way contract was claimed off waivers by the New Orleans Pelicans. On January 9, 2025, Jemison was waived by the Pelicans.

=== Los Angeles / South Bay Lakers (2025) ===
On January 15, 2025, Jemison signed a two-way contract with the Los Angeles Lakers. In 22 appearances for Los Angeles, he averaged 2.6 points, 2.8 rebounds, and 0.3 assists. On July 21, Jemison was waived by the Lakers.

=== New York / Westchester Knicks (2025–2026) ===
On September 16, 2025, Jemison signed a two-way contract with the New York Knicks. He made 13 appearances for the Knicks during the 2025–26 NBA season, averaging 1.0 points, 1.4 rebounds, and 0.4 assists. On June 13, 2026, Jemison won his first NBA championship in the 2026 NBA Finals, defeating the San Antonio Spurs 4–1.

=== Raptors 905 (2026–present) ===
On August 5, 2026, Jemison signed a two-way contract with the Toronto Raptors. On October 14, he was waived by the Raptors after suffering a hand injury. On November 5, Jemison was named to the opening night roster of the Raptors 905, the Raptors' NBA G League affiliate.

== Career statistics ==
Legend
GP	Games played	GS	Games started	MPG	Minutes per game
FG%	Field goal percentage	3P%	3-point field goal percentage	FT%	Free throw percentage
RPG	Rebounds per game	APG	Assists per game	SPG	Steals per game
BPG	Blocks per game	PPG	Points per game	**Bold**	Career high
†	Won an NBA championship

=== NBA ===
Year	Team	GP	GS	MPG	FG%	3P%	FT%	RPG	APG	SPG	BPG	PPG
2023–24	Washington	2	0	.7	—	—	—	.5	.0	.0	.0	.0
2023–24	Memphis	**23**	**14**	**24.9**	.551	—	.840	**5.8**	**1.2**	**.5**	**1.2**	**7.4**
2024–25	New Orleans	16	0	10.4	.469	—	.381	2.8	.6	.4	.4	2.4
2024–25	L.A. Lakers	22	0	10.3	**.619**	—	.417	2.8	.3	.1	.4	2.6
2025–26†	New York	13	0	6.3	.600	—	**1.000**	1.4	.4	.1	.2	1.0
Career		76	14	13.8	.555	—	.593	3.4	.6	.3	.6	3.7

== Personal life ==
Jemison is a devout Christian and regularly hosts Bible studies on his Instagram account.
