= Steve Mitchell (basketball, born 1964) =

American basketball player

Personal information
- Born: July 2, 1964 (age 62) Memphis, Tennessee, U.S.
- Listed height: 6 ft 1 in (1.85 m)
- Listed weight: 205 lb (93 kg)

Career information
- High school: Whitehaven (Memphis, Tennessee)
- College: UAB (1982–1986)
- NBA draft: 1986: 2nd round, 36th overall pick
- Drafted by: Washington Bullets
- Position: Point guard

Career highlights
- 3× First-team All-Sun Belt (1984–1986); No. 14 retired by UAB Blazers
- Stats at Basketball Reference
Medals
Men's basketball
Representing the United States
Summer Universiade
Silver medal – second place	1985 Kobe	National team

Stephen Earl Mitchell (born July 2, 1964) is an American former basketball player for the University of Alabama at Birmingham. He was selected with the 12th pick in the second round of the 1986 NBA draft by the Washington Bullets.
