= 2014–15 Southern Illinois Salukis men's basketball team =

American college basketball season

2014–15 Southern Illinois Salukis men's basketball
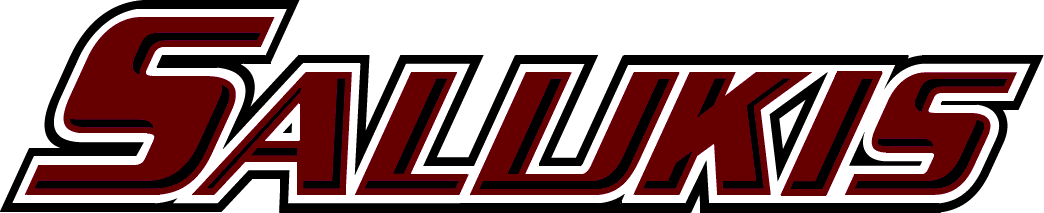
- Conference: Missouri Valley Conference
- Record: 12–21 (4–14 The Valley)
- Head coach: Barry Hinson (3rd season)
- Assistant coaches: Tom Hankins; Anthony Beane, Sr.; Terrance McGee
- Home arena: SIU Arena

2014–15 Missouri Valley Conference men's basketball standings
	Conf.				Overall
Team	W		L	PCT	W		L	PCT
No. 14 Wichita State	17	–	1	.944	30	–	5	.857
No. 11 Northern Iowa †	16	–	2	.889	31	–	4	.886
Indiana State	11	–	7	.611	15	–	16	.484
Illinois State	11	–	7	.611	22	–	13	.629
Evansville	9	–	9	.500	24	–	12	.667
Loyola Chicago	8	–	10	.444	24	–	13	.649
Drake	6	–	12	.333	9	–	22	.290
Missouri State	5	–	13	.278	11	–	20	.355
Southern Illinois	4	–	14	.222	12	–	21	.364
Bradley	3	–	15	.167	9	–	24	.273
† 2015 MVC tournament winner Rankings from AP poll

The 2014–15 Southern Illinois Salukis men's basketball team represented Southern Illinois University Carbondale during the 2014–15 NCAA Division I men's basketball season. The Salukis, led by third year head coach Barry Hinson, played their home games at the SIU Arena and were members of the Missouri Valley Conference. They finished the season 12–21, 4–14 in MVC play to finish in ninth place. They advanced to the quarterfinals of the Missouri Valley tournament where they lost to Wichita State.

== Previous season ==
The Salukis finished the season 14–19, 9–9 in MVC play to finish in a three way tie for fourth place. They advanced to the semifinals of the Missouri Valley tournament where they lost to Indiana State.

== Departures ==
Name	Number	Pos.	Height	Weight	Year	Hometown	Notes
Mike Balogun	0	G	6'1"	180	Junior	Staten Island, NY	Transferred
Desmar Jackson	3	G	6'5"	173	Senior	Warren, OH	Graduated
Davante Drinkard	4	F	6'9"	234	Senior	Toccoa, GA	Graduated
Colby Long	11	G	5'11"	170	Senior	Mount Zion, IL	Graduated
Marcus Fillyaw	12	G	6'1"	180	Sophomore	Topeka, KS	Transferred to Kentucky Wesleyan
Hunter Gibson	15	G	6'4"	190	Sophomore	Bethany, OK	Transferred
Bronson Verhines	22	F	6'6"	195	Senior	Woodlawn, IL	Graduated

=== Incoming transfers ===
Name	Number	Pos.	Height	Weight	Year	Hometown	Previous School
Deng Leek	32	C	7'0"	240	Junior	Colfax, NC	Junior college transfer from Jacksonville College

== Recruiting ==
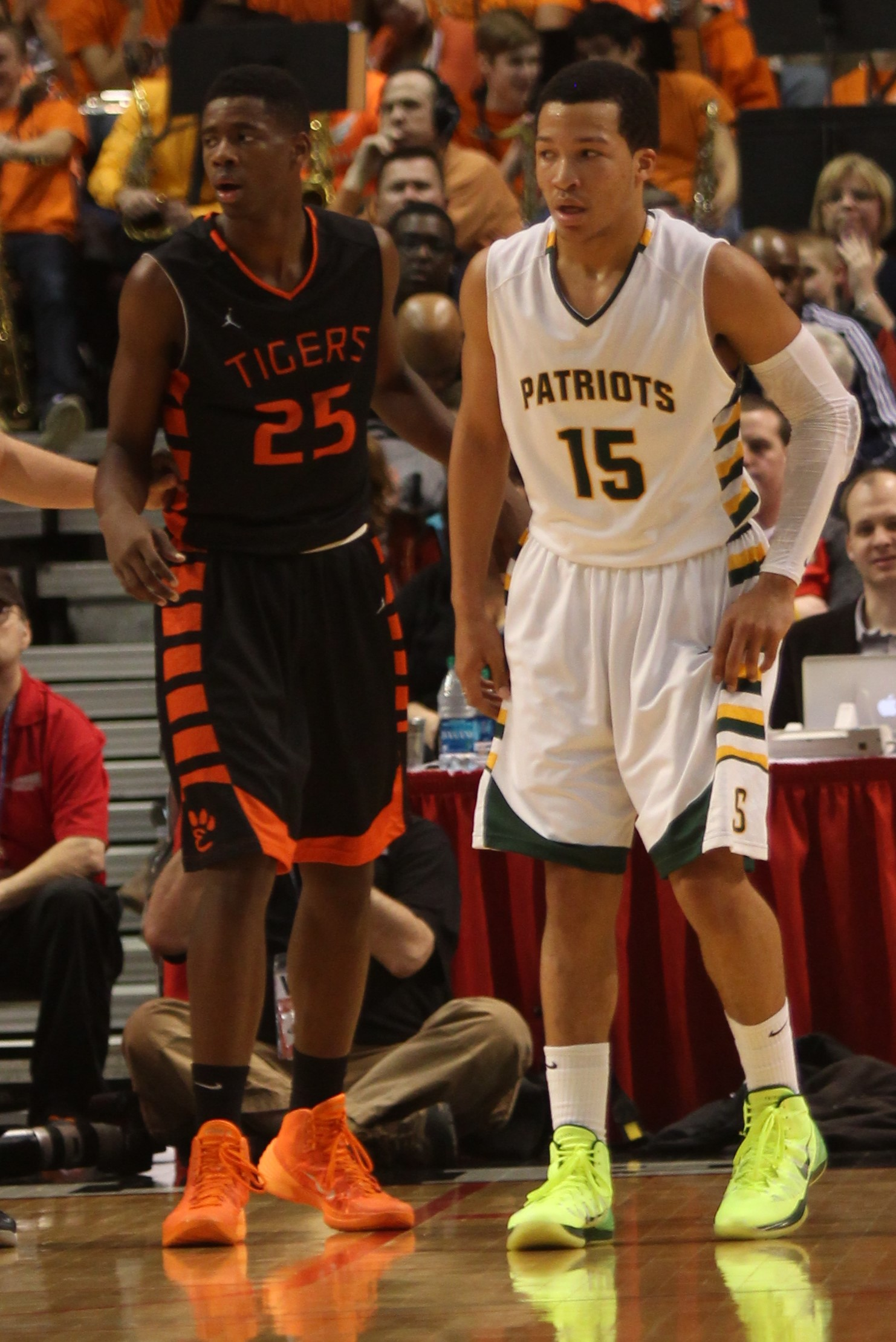
Armon Fletcher (left) helped Edwardsville High School reach the 2014 IHSA Class 4A final four (pictured with Jalen Brunson)

College recruiting information
Name	Hometown	School	Height	Weight	Commit date
Jordan Caroline; PF	Champaign, IL	Montverde Academy	6 ft 6 in (1.98 m)	235 lb (107 kg)	Jul 30, 2014
Jordan Caroline; PF	Recruit ratings: Scout: Rivals: (71)				
Chazz Glotta; SG	O'Fallon, MO	Fort Zumwalt North High School	6 ft 2 in (1.88 m)	175 lb (79 kg)	Oct 26, 2013
Chazz Glotta; SG	Recruit ratings: Scout: Rivals: (NR)				
Armon Fletcher; SF	Edwardsville, IL	Edwardsville High School	6 ft 6 in (1.98 m)	185 lb (84 kg)	N/A
Armon Fletcher; SF	Recruit ratings: Scout: Rivals: (NR)				
Deion Lavender; SG	Alton, IL	Marquette Catholic High School	6 ft 4 in (1.93 m)	N/A	Mar 3, 2014
Deion Lavender; SG	Recruit ratings: Scout: Rivals: (NR)				
Austin Weiher; PF	Seattle, WA	Creating Young Minds Academy	6 ft 8 in (2.03 m)	210 lb (95 kg)	Apr 14, 2014
Austin Weiher; PF	Recruit ratings: Scout: Rivals: (NR)				
Overall recruit ranking:
Note: In many cases, Scout, Rivals, 247Sports, On3, and ESPN may conflict in their listings of height and weight.; In these cases, the average was taken. ESPN grades are on a 100-point scale.; Sources: "2014 Team Ranking". Rivals.

== Roster ==
2014–15 Southern Illinois Salukis men's basketball team
Players
Coaches

Pos.	#	Name	Height	Weight	Year	Previous school	Hometown
G	1	Jalen Pendelton	6 ft 2 in (1.88 m)	205 lb (93 kg)	Jr	Bosse	Evansville, IN
G	2	K. C. Goodwin	5 ft 11 in (1.8 m)	205 lb (93 kg)	RS Fr	Melrose	Memphis, TN
G	5	Deion Lavender	6 ft 3 in (1.91 m)	180 lb (82 kg)	Fr	Marquette	Alton, IL
C	10	Ibby Djimde	6 ft 8 in (2.03 m)	255 lb (116 kg)	RS Jr	Illinois; Huntington Prep	Bamako, Mali
G	11	Tyler Smithpeters	6 ft 3 in (1.91 m)	170 lb (77 kg)	So	Harrisburg	Harrisburg, IL
G	13	Chaz Glotta	6 ft 2 in (1.88 m)	172 lb (78 kg)	Fr	Fort Zumwalt North	St. Louis, MO
F	14	Jordan Caroline	6 ft 6 in (1.98 m)	235 lb (107 kg)	Fr	Montverde Academy	Champaign, IL
F	15	Austin Weiher	6 ft 8 in (2.03 m)	210 lb (95 kg)	Fr	Creating Young Minds Academy	Seattle, WA
G	22	Armon Fletcher	6 ft 4 in (1.93 m)	185 lb (84 kg)	Fr	Edwardsville	Edwardsville, IL
F	23	Bola Olaniyan	6 ft 7 in (2.01 m)	225 lb (102 kg)	So	Richmond	Lagos, Nigeria
G	24	Dawson Verhines	6 ft 4 in (1.93 m)	210 lb (95 kg)	Sr	Rend Lake College; Woodlawn	Woodlawn, IL
G	25	Anthony Beane, Jr.	6 ft 2 in (1.88 m)	180 lb (82 kg)	Jr	Normal	Normal, IL
C	32	Deng Leek	7 ft 1 in (2.16 m)	245 lb (111 kg)	Jr	Jacksonville College; Wesleyan Christian Academy	Sudan
F	33	Sean O'Brien	6 ft 6 in (1.98 m)	205 lb (93 kg)	So	Mundelein	Mundelein, IL

Head coach

- Barry Hinson (Oklahoma State)

Assistant coach(es)

- Tom Hankins (Northeastern State)
- Anthony Beane, Sr. (Kansas State)
- Terrance McGee (Missouri State)

Legend

- (C) Team captain
- (S) Suspended
- (I) Ineligible
- (W) Walk-on
- Injured
- Current redshirt

Roster

== Schedule ==
Date time, TV	Opponent	Result	Record	High points	High rebounds	High assists	Site (attendance) city, state
Exhibition
11/01/2014*; 7:05 pm	Saint Mary	W 102–63		20 – Beane	8 – Olaniyan	5 – Beane	SIU Arena (4,642); Carbondale, IL
11/08/2014*; 7:05 pm	Southwest Baptist	W 79–63		22 – Beane	7 – Olaniyan	5 – Pendleton	SIU Arena (4,276); Carbondale, IL
Regular season
11/15/2014*; 7:00 pm, FSMW	at Saint Louis	L 59–62	0–1	15 – O'Brien	12 – O'Brien	3 – Goodwin	Chaifetz Arena (10,015); St. Louis, MO
11/18/2014*; 7:00 pm	at Tennessee State	W 84–67	1–1	32 – Beane	10 – Olaniyan	3 – Pendleton	Gentry Complex (1,542); Nashville, TN
11/21/2014*; 6:30 pm	vs. Kent State; Men Against Breast Cancer Classic	L 51–74	1–2	12 – O'Brien/Beane	8 – Caroline/Olaniyan	2 – Olaniyan	MAC Center (2,254); Kent OH
11/22/2014*; 4:00 pm	vs. Yale; Men Against Breast Cancer Classic	L 46–53	1–3	19 – O'Brien	6 – Caroline/Olaniyan	2 – Smithpeters	MAC Center (325); Kent, OH
11/23/2014*; 12:00 pm	vs. UIC; Men Against Breast Cancer Classic	W 67–60	2–3	27 – Beane	11 – Caroline	3 – Caroline	Memorial Athletic and Convocation Center (233); Kent, OH
11/29/2014*; 3:05 pm	Olivet Nazarene	W 76–60	3–3	27 – Beane	6 – Caroline/Smithpeters	2 – 3 tied	SIU Arena (4,302); Carbondale, IL
12/03/2014*; 7:00 pm, FSMW	at SIU Edwardsville	W 79–67	4–3	28 – Beane	6 – Caroline	3 – Smithpeters	Vadalabene Center (3,508); Edwardsville, IL
12/06/2014*; 7:35 pm	Austin Peay	W 71–49	5–3	13 – Caroline	8 – O'Brien	3 – Pendleton/O'Brien	SIU Arena (5,142); Carbondale, IL
12/10/2014*; 7:00 pm	at Southeast Missouri State	L 54–55	5–4	22 – Beane	11 – Caroline	4 – O'Brien	Show Me Center (3,507); Cape Girardeau, MO
12/14/2014*; 3:05 pm	Chicago State	W 65–50	6–4	19 – Beane	6 – Pendleton	3 – Goodwin	SIU Arena (4,328); Carbondale, IL
12/16/2014*; 7:05 pm	Tennessee State	W 65–58	7–4	15 – Beane	5 – Caroline/Olaniyan	5 – Pendleton	SIU Arena (4,222); Carbondale, IL
12/19/2014*; 7:05 pm	New Orleans	L 52–56	7–5	12 – Beane	5 – Caroline	2 – Lavender/Olaniyan	SIU Arena (4,485); Carbondale, IL
12/22/2014*; 7:05 pm	Murray State	L 71–83	7–6	19 – Beane	13 – Caroline	2 – 3 tied	SIU Arena (5,511); Carbondale, IL
Missouri Valley Conference Games
12/31/2014; 5:05 pm, ESPN3	Missouri State	L 50–53	7–7 (0–1)	16 – Beane	6 – Goodwin	2 – Lavender	SIU Arena (4,760); Carbondale, IL
01/03/2015; 7:00 pm, CSN Chicago	at Bradley	L 44–63	7–8 (0–2)	9 – O'Brien	5 – Beane/Lavender	3 – Lavender	Carver Arena (6,035); Peoria, IL
01/07/2015; 7:00 pm	at Northern Iowa	L 39–55	7–9 (0–3)	13 – Caroline	8 – Caroline	3 – Lavender	McLeod Center (3,910); Cedar Falls, IA
01/10/2015; 3:05 pm, ESPN3	Indiana State	L 56–59	7–10 (0–4)	13 – Olaniyan	11 – Olaniyan	3 – O'Brien/Pendleton	SIU Arena (4,758); Carbondale, IL
01/14/2015; 7:00 pm, ESPN3	at No. 13 Wichita State	L 55–67	7–11 (0–5)	15 – Lavender	10 – Olaniyan	3 – Beane	Charles Koch Arena (10,506); Wichita, KS
01/18/2015; 5:00 pm, ESPN3	Loyola–Chicago	W 59–52	8–11 (1–5)	20 – Beane	9 – O'Brien	2 – Caroline/O'Brien	SIU Arena (4,874); Carbondale, IL
01/21/2015; 7:00 pm, ESPN3	Bradley	W 70–59	9–11 (2–5)	16 – Beane	6 – Beane	5 – Pendelton	SIU Arena (4,792); Carbondale, IL
01/24/2015; 3:00 pm, MVCTV	at Evansville	L 66–75	9–12 (2–6)	19 – Beane	7 – Olaniyan	4 – O'Brien	Ford Center (5,521); Evansville, IN
01/28/2015; 7:05 pm, ESPN3	No. 18 Northern Iowa	L 52–59	9–13 (2–7)	10 – Djimde	8 – Olaniyan	3 – Lavender	SIU Arena (5,267); Carbondale, IL
01/31/2015; 7:05 pm, CSN Chicago	at Missouri State	L 46–52	9–14 (2–8)	14 – Caroline/Smithpeters	7 – O'Brien	3 – O'Brien/Pendelton	JQH Arena (6,324); Springfield, MO
02/04/2015; 7:05 pm	at Drake	L 61–63	9–15 (2–9)	22 – Beane	12 – Caroline	3 – Lavender	Knapp Center (3,180); Des Moines, IA
02/07/2015; 1:00 pm, MVCTV	Illinois State	W 65–59	10–15 (3–9)	23 – Beane	7 – Lavender	3 – Pendleton	SIU Arena (4,885); Carbondale, IL
02/11/2015; 7:00 pm, MVCTV	at Loyola–Chicago	L 62–66	10–16 (3–10)	17 – Lavender	11 – Caroline	3 – Smithpeters	Joseph J. Gentile Arena (2,136); Chicago, IL
02/14/2015; 3:05 pm	Evansville	L 64–72	10–17 (3–11)	13 – Caroline	15 – Caroline	1 – Beane/Caroline/O'Brien/Pendleton	SIU Arena (5,265); Carbondale, IL
02/17/2015; 7:05 pm, CSN Chicago	No. 13 Wichita State	L 62–84	10–18 (3–12)	15 – Lavender	7 – Olaniyan	3 – Olaniyan	SIU Arena (5,358); Carbondale, IL
02/21/2015; 12:05 pm, CSN Chicago	at Indiana State	L 58–78	10–19 (3–13)	22 – Beane	5 – Caroline	3 – Beane	Hulman Center (4,289); Terre Haute, IN
02/25/2015; 7:00 pm, ESPN3	at Illinois State	L 56–73	10–20 (3–14)	24 – Beane	7 – O'Brien	4 – Pendleton	Redbird Arena (5,188); Normal, IL
02/28/2015; 2:00 pm	Drake	W 63–57	11–20 (4–14)	17 – Beane	8 – Olaniyan	2 – Beane	SIU Arena (5,512); Carbondale, IL
Missouri Valley tournament
03/05/2015; 6:05 pm, MVC TV	vs. Missouri State; First round	W 55–48	12–20	17 – Ruder	11 – Kirk	4 – Williams	Scottrade Center (5,608); St. Louis, MO
03/06/2015; 6:05 pm, MVC TV/ESPN3	vs. No. 8 Wichita State; Quarterfinals	L 45–56	12–21	12 – Pendleton	7 – O'Brien	5 – Caroline	Scottrade Center (9,015); St. Louis, MO
*Non-conference game. ^{#}Rankings from AP Poll. (#) Tournament seedings in parentheses. All times are in Central Time.
