= 2014–15 Missouri State Bears basketball team =

American college basketball season

2014–15 Missouri State Bears men's basketball
- Conference: Missouri Valley Conference
- Record: 11–20 (5–13 The Valley)
- Head coach: Paul Lusk (4th season)
- Assistant coaches: Jermaine Henderson; Derrick Tilmon; Brad Korn
- Home arena: JQH Arena

2014–15 Missouri Valley Conference men's basketball standings
	Conf.				Overall
Team	W		L	PCT	W		L	PCT
No. 14 Wichita State	17	–	1	.944	30	–	5	.857
No. 11 Northern Iowa †	16	–	2	.889	31	–	4	.886
Indiana State	11	–	7	.611	15	–	16	.484
Illinois State	11	–	7	.611	22	–	13	.629
Evansville	9	–	9	.500	24	–	12	.667
Loyola Chicago	8	–	10	.444	24	–	13	.649
Drake	6	–	12	.333	9	–	22	.290
Missouri State	5	–	13	.278	11	–	20	.355
Southern Illinois	4	–	14	.222	12	–	21	.364
Bradley	3	–	15	.167	9	–	24	.273
† 2015 MVC tournament winner Rankings from AP poll

The 2014–15 Missouri State Bears basketball team represented Missouri State University during the 2014–15 NCAA Division I men's basketball season. The Bears, led by fourth year head coach Paul Lusk, played their home games at JQH Arena and were members of the Missouri Valley Conference. They finished the season 11–20, 5–13 in MVC play to finish in eighth place. They lost in the first round of the Missouri Valley tournament to Southern Illinois.

== Previous season ==
The Bears finished the season 20–13, 9–9 in Missouri Valley play to finish in a three way tie for fourth place. They advanced to the semifinals of the Missouri Valley tournament where they lost to Wichita State. They were invited to the CollegeInsider.com Tournament where they lost in the first round to Murray State.

== Departures ==
Name	Number	Pos.	Height	Weight	Year	Hometown	Notes
Keith Pickens	1	G/F	6'4"	203	Senior	St. Louis, MO	Graduated
Michael Simpson	3	G/F	6'6"	190	Sophomore	Spring, TX	Transferred to Palm Beach Atlantic
Jarmar Gulley	5	F	6'5"	218	Senior	Beaumont, TX	Graduated
Devon Thomas	12	G	6'0"	162	Freshman	Silver Spring, MD	Transferred to Cloud County Community College
Emmanuel Addo	24	F	6'8"	230	Senior	Toronto, ON	Graduated
Nathan Scheer	30	G/F	6'5"	201	Senior	Washington, MO	Graduated
Bruce Marshall	35	C	6'10"	236	Sophomore	Fayette, MO	Transferred to Missouri Southern

=== Incoming transfers ===
Name	Number	Pos.	Height	Weight	Year	Hometown	Previous School
Loomis Gerring	3	F	6'5"	200	Junior	Grandview, MO	Junior college transfer from Vincennes University.
Camyn Boone	30	F	6'6"	230	Junior	Seattle, WA	Junior college transfer from Mesa Community College.

== Incoming recruits ==
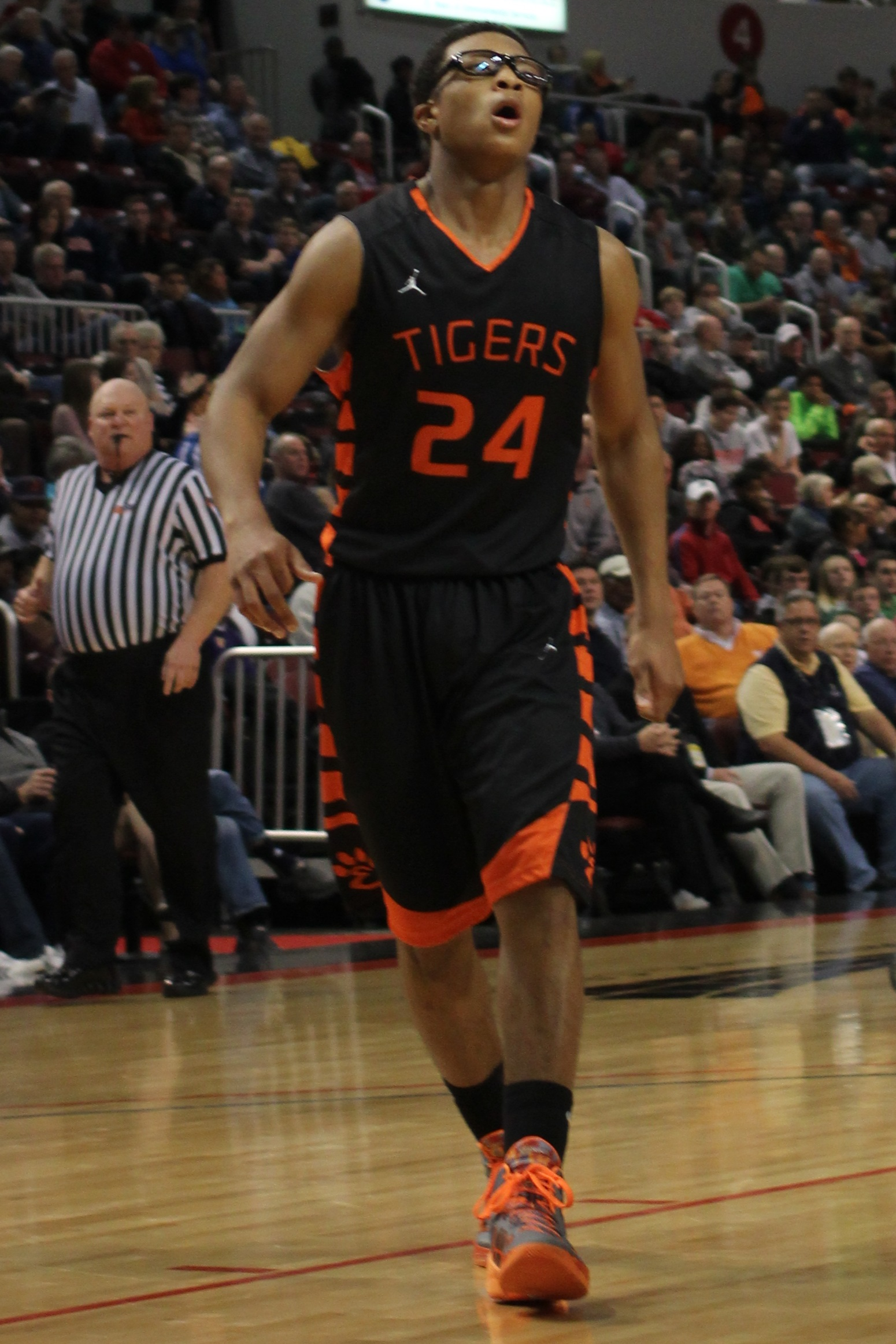
Shawn Roundtree in the 2014 IHSA Class 4A final four

College recruiting information
Name	Hometown	School	Height	Weight	Commit date
Chris Kendrix; SG	Willard, MO	Willard High School	6 ft 5 in (1.96 m)	180 lb (82 kg)	Aug 26, 2013
Chris Kendrix; SG	Recruit ratings: Scout: Rivals: (NR)				
Robin Thompson; SF	Saint Louis, MO	Mary Institute Country Day School	6 ft 6 in (1.98 m)	195 lb (88 kg)	N/A
Robin Thompson; SF	Recruit ratings: Scout: Rivals: (NR)				
Shawn Roundtree; PG	Edwardsville, IL	Edwardsville High School	6 ft 1 in (1.85 m)	175 lb (79 kg)	Apr 28, 2014
Shawn Roundtree; PG	Recruit ratings: Scout: Rivals: (NR)				
Overall recruit ranking:
Note: In many cases, Scout, Rivals, 247Sports, On3, and ESPN may conflict in their listings of height and weight.; In these cases, the average was taken. ESPN grades are on a 100-point scale.; Sources: "2014 Team Ranking". Rivals.

== Roster ==
2014–15 Missouri State Bears men's basketball team
Players
Coaches

Pos.	#	Name	Height	Weight	Year	Previous school	Hometown
F	1	Robin Thompson	6 ft 6 in (1.98 m)	221 lb (100 kg)	Fr	MICDS	St. Louis, MO
G	2	Austin Ruder	6 ft 3 in (1.91 m)	196 lb (89 kg)	So	Nixa	Nixa, MO
F	3	Loomis Gerring	6 ft 5 in (1.96 m)	200 lb (91 kg)	Jr	Grandview; Vincennes	Grandview, MO
G/F	10	Ron Mvouika	6 ft 6 in (1.98 m)	201 lb (91 kg)	Sr	Huntington Prep School; Sheridan College	Paris, France
G	11	Marcus Marshall	6 ft 3 in (1.91 m)	190 lb (86 kg)	Jr	Johnson Sr. HS	Saint Paul, MN
G	12	Cameron Maes	6 ft 4 in (1.93 m)	200 lb (91 kg)	Fr	Glendale HS	Springfield, MO
F	20	Gavin Thurman	6 ft 7 in (2.01 m)	226 lb (103 kg)	Jr	Wichita Heights HS	Wichita, KS
G	23	Dorrian Williams	6 ft 3 in (1.91 m)	199 lb (90 kg)	Jr	Douglass HS	Oklahoma City, OK
G	24	Shawn Roundtree	6 ft 0 in (1.83 m)	180 lb (82 kg)	Fr	Edwardsville HS	Edwardsville, IL
F	30	Camyn Boone	6 ft 6 in (1.98 m)	235 lb (107 kg)	Jr	Mountain View HS; Mesa CC	Seattle, WA
G/F	33	Chris Kendrix	6 ft 4 in (1.93 m)	183 lb (83 kg)	Fr	Willard HS	Willard, MO
F	42	Christian Kirk	6 ft 8 in (2.03 m)	218 lb (99 kg)	Sr	Kickapoo HS	Springfield, MO
C	50	Tyler McCullough	6 ft 11 in (2.11 m)	246 lb (112 kg)	So	Fayetteville HS	Fayetteville, AR

Head coach

- Paul Lusk (Southern Illinois)

Assistant coach(es)

- Jermaine Henderson (Miami (OH))
- Derrick Tilmon (Southern Illinois)
- Brad Korn (Southern Illinois)

Legend

- (C) Team captain
- (S) Suspended
- (I) Ineligible
- (W) Walk-on
- Injured
- Current redshirt

Roster

== Schedule ==
Date time, TV	Opponent	Result	Record	Site (attendance) city, state
Exhibition
11/08/2014*; 7:35 pm	Missouri Southern State	W 68–66		JQH Arena (3,327); Springfield, MO
Regular season
11/14/2014*; 7:05 pm, MC-22	Eastern Illinois	W 64–53	1–0	JQH Arena (6,004); Springfield, MO
11/19/2014*; 7:05 pm	Avila	W 87–39	2–0	JQH Arena (5,089); Springfield, MO
11/22/2014*; 7:00 pm, KOLR	at Texas Tech	L 68–80	2–1	United Supermarkets Arena (5,107); Lubbock, TX
11/26/2014*; 1:00 am, CBSSN	vs. Colorado State; Great Alaska Shootout quarterfinals	L 61–76	2–2	Alaska Airlines Center (3,233); Anchorage, AK
11/28/2014*; 3:00 pm	at Alaska Anchorage; Great Alaska Shootout consolation round	W 55–51	3–2	Alaska Airlines Center (2,414); Anchorage, AK
11/29/2014*; 5:30 pm, CBSSN	vs. Washington State; Great Alaska Shootout 5th place game	L 84–89 ^{OT}	3–3	Alaska Airlines Center (2,543); Anchorage, AK
12/04/2014*; 7:05 pm	Arkansas–Little Rock	W 73–68	4–3	JQH Arena (5,207); Springfield, MO
12/07/2014*; 3:00 pm, KOZL	at Oral Roberts			Mabee Center; Tulsa, OK
12/13/2014*; 6:00 pm, KOZL	at Southeast Missouri State	W 73–61	5–3	Show Me Center (3,043); Cape Girardeau, MO
12/15/2014*; 8:00 pm, KOZL	at Oral Roberts	L 61–80	5–4	Mabee Center (2,567); Tulsa, OK
12/17/2014*; 7:05 pm, ESPN3	at Tulsa	L 70–74	5–5	Reynolds Center (4,245); Tulsa, OK
12/20/2014*; 2:05 pm	Eastern Michigan	L 65–77	5–6	JQH Arena (5,013); Springfield, MO
12/22/2014*; 7:05 pm, MC-22	Oral Roberts	W 52–45	6–6	JQH Arena (5,327); Springfield, MO
Missouri Valley Conference regular season
12/31/2014; 5:05 pm, KOLR	at Southern Illinois	W 53–50	7–6 (1–0)	SIU Arena (4,760); Carbondale, IL
01/03/2015; 3:00 pm, FSMW	Drake	W 62–37	8–6 (2–0)	JQH Arena (5,821); Springfield, MO
01/07/2015; 6:00 pm, ESPN3	at Indiana State	L 56–71	8–7 (2–1)	Hulman Center (3,677); Terre Haute, IN
01/11/2015; 2:00 pm, ESPN3	Illinois State	L 55–69	8–8 (2–2)	JQH Arena (5,224); Springfield, MO
01/14/2015; 7:05 pm, MC-22	Evansville	L 54–56	8–9 (2–3)	JQH Arena (5,097); Springfield, MO
01/18/2015; 3:00 pm, ESPNU	No. 23 Northern Iowa	L 46–60	8–10 (2–4)	McLeod Center (4,941); Cedar Falls, IA
01/21/2015; 7:05 pm, KOZL	No. 14 Wichita State	L 53–76	8–11 (2–5)	JQH Arena (8,674); Springfield, MO
01/24/2015; 7:00 pm, KOLR	at Bradley	L 59–61	8–12 (2–6)	Carver Arena (6,059); Peoria, IL
01/28/2015; 7:00 pm, ESPN3	at Illinois State	L 57–67	8–13 (2–7)	Redbird Arena (4,177); Normal, IL
01/31/2015; 7:05 pm, KOLR	Southern Illinois	W 52–46	9–13 (3–7)	JQH Arena (6,324); Springfield, MO
02/04/2015; 8:00 pm, FSMW/CSN Chicago	Loyola–Chicago	L 50–53	9–14 (3–8)	JQH Arena (3,218); Springfield, MO
02/07/2015; 7:00 pm, ESPN2	at No. 16 Wichita State	L 35–78	9–15 (3–9)	Charles Koch Arena (10,506); Wichita, KS
02/10/2015; 7:05 pm, KOZL	at Evansville	L 66–73	9–16 (3–10)	Ford Center (3,502); Evansville, IN
02/15/2015; 3:00 pm, ESPNU	No. 13 Northern Iowa	L 57–68	9–17 (3–11)	JQH Arena (5,452); Springfield, MO
02/18/2015; 7:00 pm, ESPN3	Indiana State	W 60–56	10–17 (4–11)	JQH Arena (3,297); Springfield, MO
02/22/2015; 1:00 pm, ESPN3	at Drake	L 43–78	10–18 (4–12)	Knapp Center (3,656); Des Moines, IA
02/25/2015; 7:05 pm, MC-22	Bradley	W 80–77 ^{3OT}	11–18 (5–12)	JQH Arena (4,454); Springfield, MO
02/28/2015; 3:00 pm, ESPN3	at Loyola–Chicago	L 51–65	11–19 (5–13)	Joseph J. Gentile Arena (1,989); Chicago, IL
Missouri Valley tournament
03/05/2015; 6:05 pm, MVC TV	vs. Southern Illinois; First round	L 48–55	11–20	Scottrade Center (5,608); St. Louis, MO
*Non-conference game. ^{#}Rankings from AP Poll. (#) Tournament seedings in parentheses. All times are in Central Time.

* December 7's game vs Missouri State was postponed due to a power outage.
