= 2014–15 Drake Bulldogs men's basketball team =

American college basketball season

2014–15 Drake Bulldogs men's basketball
- Conference: Missouri Valley Conference
- Record: 9–22 (6–12 MVC)
- Head coach: Ray Giacoletti (2nd season)
- Assistant coaches: Jeff Rutter; Todd Townsend; Dave Buchanan
- Home arena: Knapp Center

2014–15 Missouri Valley Conference men's basketball standings
	Conf.				Overall
Team	W		L	PCT	W		L	PCT
No. 14 Wichita State	17	–	1	.944	30	–	5	.857
No. 11 Northern Iowa †	16	–	2	.889	31	–	4	.886
Indiana State	11	–	7	.611	15	–	16	.484
Illinois State	11	–	7	.611	22	–	13	.629
Evansville	9	–	9	.500	24	–	12	.667
Loyola Chicago	8	–	10	.444	24	–	13	.649
Drake	6	–	12	.333	9	–	22	.290
Missouri State	5	–	13	.278	11	–	20	.355
Southern Illinois	4	–	14	.222	12	–	21	.364
Bradley	3	–	15	.167	9	–	24	.273
† 2015 MVC tournament winner Rankings from AP poll

The 2014–15 Drake Bulldogs men's basketball team represented Drake University during the 2014–15 NCAA Division I men's basketball season. The Bulldogs, led by second year head coach Ray Giacoletti, played their home games at the Knapp Center and were members of the Missouri Valley Conference. They finished the season 9–22, 6–12 in MVC play to finish in seventh place. They lost in the first round of the Missouri Valley tournament to Bradley.

Guard Reed Timmer was named to the conference's all-freshmen team.

== Previous season ==
The Bulldogs finished the season 15–16, 6–12 in MVC play to finish in a tie for eighth place. They lost in the first round of the Missouri Valley tournament to Evansville.

== Departures ==
Name	Number	Pos.	Height	Weight	Year	Hometown	Notes
Richard Carter	3	G	5'11"	177	Senior	Detroit, MI	Graduated
Robert Puleikis	21	C	6'10"	221	Sophomore	Detroit, MI	Transferred to Walsh
Mitch McLaughlin	23	G	6'0"	181	Sophomore	Cedar Rapids, IA	Transferred to Elmhurst College
Aaron Hawley	31	G/F	6'8"	197	Senior	Rogers, AR	Graduated
Daddy Ugbede	40	F	6'6"	216	Sophomore	Gardena, CA	Transferred to Indiana (PA)
Seth VanDeest	45	C	6'11"	269	Senior	Bettendorf, IA	Graduated

=== Incoming transfers ===
Name	Number	Pos.	Height	Weight	Year	Hometown	Previous school
Graham Woodward	13	G	6'0"	178	Sophomore	Edina, MN	Transferred from Penn State. Under NCAA transfer rules, Woodward will have to redshirt for the 2014–15 season. Will have three years of remaining eligibility.
Kale Abrahamson	31	F	6'8"	221	Junior	West Des Moines, IA	Transferred from Northwestern. Under NCAA transfer rules, Abrahamson will have to redshirt for the 2014–15 season. Will have two years of remaining eligibility.

== Incoming recruits ==
=== Class of 2014 recruits ===
College recruiting information
Name	Hometown	School	Height	Weight	Commit date
Casey Schlatter; SF	Iowa Falls, IA	Iowa Falls Alden High School	6 ft 10 in (2.08 m)	207 lb (94 kg)	May 11, 2013
Casey Schlatter; SF	Recruit ratings: Scout: Rivals: (71)				
Ore Arogundade; SG	Arlington Heights, IL	Saint Viator High School	6 ft 3 in (1.91 m)	185 lb (84 kg)	Aug 12, 2013
Ore Arogundade; SG	Recruit ratings: Scout: Rivals: (69)				
Kory Kuenstling; C	Dunkerton, IA	Dunkerton Community School	6 ft 11 in (2.11 m)	232 lb (105 kg)	Jul 2, 2013
Kory Kuenstling; C	Recruit ratings: Scout: Rivals: (67)				
Reed Timmer; PG	New Berlin, WI	Eisenhower High School	6 ft 1 in (1.85 m)	185 lb (84 kg)	Aug 11, 2013
Reed Timmer; PG	Recruit ratings: Scout: Rivals: (N/A)				
C.J. Rivers; SG	Cahokia, IL	Cahokia High School	6 ft 2 in (1.88 m)	186 lb (84 kg)	Aug 15, 2013
C.J. Rivers; SG	Recruit ratings: Scout: Rivals: (N/A)				
Overall recruit ranking:
Note: In many cases, Scout, Rivals, 247Sports, On3, and ESPN may conflict in their listings of height and weight.; In these cases, the average was taken. ESPN grades are on a 100-point scale.; Sources: "2014 Team Ranking". Rivals.

== Roster ==
2014–15 Drake Bulldogs men's basketball team
Players
Coaches

Pos.	#	Name	Height	Weight	Year	Previous school	Hometown
G	0	C.J. Rivers	6 ft 2 in (1.88 m)	186 lb (84 kg)	Fr	Cahokia	Cahokia, IL
G	1	Karl Madison	5 ft 11 in (1.8 m)	174 lb (79 kg)	RS Sr	Lanphier	Springfield, IL
G	2	Gary Ricks, Jr.	6 ft 1 in (1.85 m)	181 lb (82 kg)	RS Sr	Sylmar	Los Angeles, CA
G	3	Jordan Daniels	5 ft 10 in (1.78 m)	150 lb (68 kg)	Sr	Boston College; Etiwanda	Fontana, CA
F	4	Blake Danielak	6 ft 8 in (2.03 m)	206 lb (93 kg)	So	Liberty Hill	Georgetown, TX
F	10	Trevor Berkeley	6 ft 6 in (1.98 m)	200 lb (91 kg)	Sr	Tyler JC; Tucker	Tucker, GA
C	11	Jacob Jensen Enevold	7 ft 0 in (2.13 m)	251 lb (114 kg)	So	Falkonergardens Gymnasium	Lunderskov, Denmark
G	12	Reed Timmer	6 ft 1 in (1.85 m)	185 lb (84 kg)	Fr	Eisenhower	New Berlin, WI
G	13	Graham Woodward (redshirt)	6 ft 0 in (1.83 m)	178 lb (81 kg)	So	Penn State; Edina HS	Edina, MN
G	14	A.J. Rutter	6 ft 1 in (1.85 m)	170 lb (77 kg)	So	Gilbert	Ames, IA
F	22	Casey Schlatter	6 ft 10 in (2.08 m)	207 lb (94 kg)	Fr	Iowa Falls Alden	Iowa Falls, IA
G	23	Ore Arogundade	6 ft 3 in (1.91 m)	185 lb (84 kg)	Fr	St. Viator	Arlington Heights, IL
G/F	25	Chris Caird	6 ft 6 in (1.98 m)	232 lb (105 kg)	Sr	Marshalltown	Daventry, England
F	31	Kale Abrahamson (redshirt)	6 ft 8 in (2.03 m)	221 lb (100 kg)	Jr	Northwestern; Valley HS	West Des Moines, IA
C	32	Kory Kuenstling	6 ft 11 in (2.11 m)	232 lb (105 kg)	Fr	Dunkerton Community School	Dunkerton, IA

Head coach

- Ray Giacoletti (Minot State)

Assistant coach(es)

- Jeff Rutter (Winona State)
- Todd Townsend (Marquette)
- Dave Buchanan (UW–La Crosse)

Legend

- (C) Team captain
- (S) Suspended
- (I) Ineligible
- (W) Walk-on
- Injured
- Current redshirt

Roster

== Schedule ==
Date time, TV	Opponent	Result	Record	Site (attendance) city, state
Exhibition
11/08/2014*; 2:05 pm	Coe	W 78–53		Knapp Center (3,134); Des Moines, IA
Non-conference regular season
11/15/2014*; 2:05 pm	Bowling Green	L 58–77	0–1	Knapp Center (3,362); Des Moines, IA
11/18/2014*; 8:00 pm, FS1	at DePaul	L 62–80	0–2	Allstate Arena (5,340); Rosemont, IL
11/22/2014*; 1:00 pm	at Western Michigan	L 75–91	0–3	University Arena (2,328); Kalamazoo, MI
11/25/2014*; 7:05 pm	IUPUI	W 73–60	1–3	Knapp Center (3,108); Des Moines, IA
11/28/2014*; 5:00 pm	vs. Valparaiso; Challenge in Music City	L 46–66	1–4	Nashville Municipal Auditorium (N/A); Nashville, TN
11/29/2014*; 5:00 pm	vs. Portland; Challenge in Music City	L 59–71	1–5	Nashville Municipal Auditorium (N/A); Nashville, TN
11/30/2014*; 3:30 pm	vs. Murray State; Challenge in Music City	L 59–68	1–6	Nashville Municipal Auditorium (N/A); Nashville, TN
12/06/2014*; 2:05 pm	North Dakota	L 62–63	1–7	Knapp Center (3,162); Des Moines, IA
12/13/2014*; 4:00 pm	at Green Bay	L 48–64	1–8	Resch Center (3,399); Green Bay, WI
12/15/2014*; 7:05 pm	Jackson State	W 76–66	2–8	Knapp Center (2,555); Des Moines, IA
12/20/2014*; 4:00 pm	vs. No. 13 Iowa State; Big Four Classic	L 54–83	2–9	Wells Fargo Arena (15,142); Des Moines, IA
12/22/2014*; 7:05 pm	Simpson	W 84–62	3–9	Knapp Center (3,239); Des Moines, IA
Missouri Valley Conference Regular season
12/31/2014; 5:05 pm	No. 16 Wichita State	L 58–66	3–10 (0–1)	Knapp Center (4,170); Des Moines, IA
01/03/2015; 3:00 pm, FSMW	at Missouri State	L 37–62	3–11 (0–2)	JQH Arena (5,821); Springfield, MO
01/07/2015; 7:00 pm	at Illinois State	L 45–81	3–12 (0–3)	Redbird Arena (3,809); Normal, IL
01/10/2015; 3:00 pm, ESPN3	Northern Iowa	L 40–64	3–13 (0–4)	Knapp Center (4,780); Des Moines, IA
01/14/2015; 3:00 pm, ESPN3	at Loyola–Chicago	L 47–50	3–14 (0–5)	Joseph J. Gentile Arena (1,572); Chicago, IL
01/17/2015; 2:05 pm	Indiana State	W 84–78	4–14 (1–5)	Knapp Center (3,283); Des Moines, IA
01/20/2015; 7:05 pm	Illinois State	L 56–64	4–15 (1–6)	Knapp Center (2,886); Des Moines, IA
01/25/2015; 3:00 pm, ESPN3	at No. 14 Wichita State	L 40–74	4–16 (1–7)	Charles Koch Arena (10,506); Wichita, KS
01/28/2015; 2:05 pm, ESPN3	at Bradley	W 69–57	5–16 (2–7)	Carver Arena (5,431); Peoria, IL
01/31/2015; 2:05 pm	Evansville	W 70–65	6–16 (3–7)	Knapp Center (4,120); Des Moines, IA
02/04/2015; 7:05 pm	Southern Illinois	W 63–61	7–16 (4–7)	Knapp Center (3,180); Des Moines, IA
02/07/2015; 7:00 pm, ESPN3	at No. 14 Northern Iowa	L 53–69	7–17 (4–8)	McLeod Center (6,650); Cedar Falls, IA
02/11/2015; 7:05 pm	Bradley	W 60–54	8–17 (5–8)	Knapp Center (3,146); Des Moines, IA
02/14/2015; 3:00 pm, ESPN3	at Indiana State	L 54–75	8–18 (5–9)	Hulman Center (4,250); Terre Haute, IN
02/17/2015; 7:00 pm	at Evansville	L 52–61	8–19 (5–10)	Ford Center (3,418); Evansville, IN
02/22/2015; 1:00 pm, ESPN3	Missouri State	W 78–43	9–19 (6–10)	Knapp Center (3,656); Des Moines, IA
02/25/2015; 7:05 pm	Loyola–Chicago	L 75–80 ^{OT}	9–20 (6–11)	Knapp Center (3,271); Des Moines, IA
02/28/2015; 2:00 pm	at Southern Illinois	L 57–63	9–21 (6–12)	SIU Arena (5,512); Carbondale, IL
Missouri Valley tournament
03/05/2015; 8:35 pm, MVC TV	vs. Bradley; First round	L 50–52 ^{OT}	9–22	Scottrade Center (5,608); St. Louis, MO
*Non-conference game. ^{#}Rankings from AP Poll. (#) Tournament seedings in parentheses. All times are in Central Time.
