= 2014–15 Indiana State Sycamores men's basketball team =

American college basketball season

2014–15 Indiana State Sycamores men's basketball
- Conference: Missouri Valley Conference
- Record: 15–16 (11–7 The Valley)
- Head coach: Greg Lansing (5th season)
- Assistant coaches: Lou Gudino; Marcus Belcher; Terry Parker
- Home arena: Hulman Center

2014–15 Missouri Valley Conference men's basketball standings
| | Conf. | | | | Overall |
| Team | W | | L | PCT | W | | L | PCT |
|---|---|---|---|---|---|---|---|---|
| No. 14 Wichita State | 17 | – | 1 | .944 | 30 | – | 5 | .857 |
| No. 11 Northern Iowa † | 16 | – | 2 | .889 | 31 | – | 4 | .886 |
| Indiana State | 11 | – | 7 | .611 | 15 | – | 16 | .484 |
| Illinois State | 11 | – | 7 | .611 | 22 | – | 13 | .629 |
| Evansville | 9 | – | 9 | .500 | 24 | – | 12 | .667 |
| Loyola Chicago | 8 | – | 10 | .444 | 24 | – | 13 | .649 |
| Drake | 6 | – | 12 | .333 | 9 | – | 22 | .290 |
| Missouri State | 5 | – | 13 | .278 | 11 | – | 20 | .355 |
| Southern Illinois | 4 | – | 14 | .222 | 12 | – | 21 | .364 |
| Bradley | 3 | – | 15 | .167 | 9 | – | 24 | .273 |
† 2015 MVC tournament winner Rankings from AP poll

The 2014–15 Indiana State Sycamores basketball team represented Indiana State University during the 2014–15 NCAA Division I men's basketball season. The Sycamores, led by fifth year head coach Greg Lansing, played their home games at the Hulman Center and were members of the Missouri Valley Conference. They finished the season 15–16, 11–7 in MVC play to finish in a tie for third place. They lost in the quarterfinals of the Missouri Valley tournament to Loyola–Chicago.

== Previous season ==
The Sycamores finished the season 23–11, 12–6 in MVC play to finish in second place. They advanced to the championship game of the Missouri Valley Conference tournament where they lost to Wichita State. They were invited to the National Invitation Tournament where they lost in the first round to Arkansas.

== Departures ==
| Name | Number | Pos. | Height | Weight | Year | Hometown | Notes |
|---|---|---|---|---|---|---|---|
| Lucas Eitel | 2 | G | 6'3" | 195 | Senior | Marshall, IL | Graduated |
| Manny Arop | 3 | G/F | 6'5" | 215 | Senior | Edmonton, AB | Graduated |
| Dawon Cummings | 12 | G | 6'3" | 175 | Senior | Kansas City, MO | Graduated |
| Jake Odum | 13 | G | 6'4" | 180 | Senior | Terre Haute, IN | Graduated |
| Demetrius Moore | 15 | F | 6'7" | 230 | Junior | Paxton, FL | Transferred to West Florida |
| Mike Samuels | 30 | C | 6'11" | 290 | Junior | Bushkill, PA | Transferred to Eastern Michigan |

=== Incoming transfers ===
| Name | Number | Pos. | Height | Weight | Year | Hometown | Previous School |
|---|---|---|---|---|---|---|---|
| Tre' Bennett | 15 | G | 5'11" | 175 | Junior | Houston, TX | Junior college transfer from Lamar State College. |
| Grant Prusator | 20 | G | 6'2" | 175 | Sophomore | Rochelle, IL | Junior college transfer from Highland Community College. |
| Matt Van Scyoc | 30 | G/F | 6'6" | 218 | Junior | Green Lake, WI | Transferred from The Citadel. Under NCAA transfer rules, Van Scyoc will have to redshirt for the 2014–15 season. Will have two years of remaining eligibility. |

=== Recruiting ===
College recruiting information
| Name | Hometown | School | Height | Weight | Commit date |
|---|---|---|---|---|---|
| Brandon Murphy; PF | Birmingham, AL | Carver High School | 6 ft 7 in (2.01 m) | 270 lb (120 kg) | N/A |
| Brandon Murphy; PF | Recruit ratings: Scout: Rivals: (NR) | | | | |
| Laquarious Paige; SG | Orange, TX | West Orange-Stark High School | 6 ft 3 in (1.91 m) | 175 lb (79 kg) | Sep 30, 2013 |
| Laquarious Paige; SG | Recruit ratings: Scout: Rivals: (NR) | | | | |
Overall recruit ranking:
Note: In many cases, Scout, Rivals, 247Sports, On3, and ESPN may conflict in their listings of height and weight.; In these cases, the average was taken. ESPN grades are on a 100-point scale.; Sources: "2014 Team Ranking". Rivals.

== Roster ==
2014–15 Indiana State Sycamores men's basketball team
Players
Coaches

| Pos. | # | Name | Height | Weight | Year | Previous school | Hometown |
|---|---|---|---|---|---|---|---|
| F/C | 0 | Jake Kitchell | 6 ft 10 in (2.08 m) | 233 lb (106 kg) | Sr | South Central HS | Union Mills, IN |
| G/F | 1 | Kristian Smith | 6 ft 6 in (1.98 m) | 200 lb (91 kg) | Jr | Pike HS | Indianapolis, IN |
| G/F | 2 | Alex Etherington | 6 ft 5 in (1.96 m) | 210 lb (95 kg) | RS Fr | Hamilton Heights HS | Cicero, IN |
| G | 4 | Brenton Scott | 6 ft 1 in (1.85 m) | 192 lb (87 kg) | RS Fr | Northrop HS | Fort Wayne, IN |
| F | 5 | Justin Gant | 6 ft 9 in (2.06 m) | 240 lb (109 kg) | Sr | Terre Haute North Vigo HS | Terre Haute, IN |
| G | 10 | Kalen Alexander (W) | 6 ft 3 in (1.91 m) | 169 lb (77 kg) | So | Terre Haute North Vigo HS | Terre Haute, IN |
| G | 11 | Devonte Brown | 6 ft 2 in (1.88 m) | 195 lb (88 kg) | Jr | Ellison HS | Killeen, TX |
| G | 15 | Tre' Bennett | 5 ft 10 in (1.78 m) | 183 lb (83 kg) | Jr | Lamar State CC; Yates HS | Houston, TX |
| G | 20 | Grant Prusator | 6 ft 0 in (1.83 m) | 171 lb (78 kg) | So | Highland CC; Rochelle Township HS | Rochelle, IL |
| G | 22 | Brandon Burnett | 6 ft 6 in (1.98 m) | 232 lb (105 kg) | Jr | Cienega HS | Tucson, AZ |
| F | 30 | Matt Van Scyoc (redshirt) | 6 ft 6 in (1.98 m) | 218 lb (99 kg) | Jr | The Citadel; Green Lake HS | Green Lake, WI |
| G | 32 | Laquarious Paige | 6 ft 3 in (1.91 m) | 174 lb (79 kg) | Fr | Stark HS | West Orange, TX |
| F/C | 34 | Brandon Murphy | 6 ft 7 in (2.01 m) | 290 lb (132 kg) | Fr | Carver HS | Montgomery, AL |
| G/F | 41 | Nick Amor (W) | 6 ft 4 in (1.93 m) | 187 lb (85 kg) | So | LaVille HS | Lakeville, IN |
| F/C | 42 | TJ Bell | 6 ft 8 in (2.03 m) | 254 lb (115 kg) | So | Charleston HS | Charleston, IL |

Head coach

- Greg Lansing (South Dakota)

Assistant coach(es)

- Lou Gudino (Indiana)
- Marcus Belcher (Southern Illinois)
- Terry Parker (Louisiana Tech)

Legend

- (C) Team captain
- (S) Suspended
- (I) Ineligible
- (W) Walk-on
- Injured
- Current redshirt

Roster

== Schedule ==
| Date time, TV | Opponent | Result | Record | Site (attendance) city, state |
Exhibition
| 11/09/2014*; 2:05 pm | Trine | W 68–54 | | Hulman Center (4,875); Terre Haute, IN |
Regular season
| 11/14/2014*; 7:05 pm | at IUPUI | W 79–66 ^{OT} | 1–0 | Fairgrounds Coliseum (3,159); Indianapolis, IN |
| 11/18/2014*; 7:05 pm | Saint Louis | L 56–69 | 1–1 | Hulman Center (4,348); Terre Haute, IN |
| 11/22/2014*; 6:00 pm | Brown; Las Vegas Invitational | W 78–66 | 2–1 | Hulman Center (3,721); Terre Haute, IN |
| 11/24/2014*; 5:30 pm | Austin Peay; Las Vegas Invitational | W 61–57 | 3–1 | Hulman Center (N/A); Terre Haute, IN |
| 11/27/2014*; 5:00 pm, FS1 | vs. Illinois; Las Vegas Invitational semifinals | L 62–88 | 3–2 | Orleans Arena (N/A); Paradise, NV |
| 11/28/2014*; 8:00 pm, FS1 | vs. Memphis; Las Vegas Invitational 3rd place game | L 62–72 | 3–3 | Orleans Arena (N/A); Paradise, NV |
| 12/03/2014*; 7:05 pm | No. 23 Butler | L 54–77 | 3–4 | Hulman Center (5,528); Terre Haute, IN |
| 12/06/2014*; 2:00 pm | at Ball State | L 63–70 | 3–5 | Worthen Arena (3,152); Muncie, IN |
| 12/13/2014*; 2:00 pm | at Iona | L 84–91 | 3–6 | Hynes Athletic Center (1,681); New Rochelle, NY |
| 12/16/2014; 7:05 pm | Truman State | W 78–68 | 4–6 | Hulman Center (3,561); Terre Haute, IN |
| 12/20/2014*; 2:05 pm | Eastern Illinois | L 56–60 | 4–7 | Hulman Center (3,571); Terre Haute, IN |
| 12/28/2014*; 2:05 pm | UMKC | L 70–73 ^{2OT} | 4–8 | Hulman Center (3,578); Terre Haute, IN |
Missouri Valley Conference regular season
| 12/31/2014; 4:00 pm, ESPN3 | at Illinois State | W 63–61 | 5–8 (1–0) | Redbird Arena (5,372); Normal, IL |
| 01/04/2015; 1:30 pm, ESPN3 | Evansville | W 79–75 ^{OT} | 6–8 (1–1) | Hulman Center (3,948); Terre Haute, IN |
| 01/07/2015; 7:05 pm, ESPN3 | Missouri State | W 71–56 | 7–8 (3–0) | Hulman Center (3,677); Terre Haute, IN |
| 01/10/2015; 4:05 pm, ESPN3 | at Southern Illinois | W 59–56 | 8–8 (4–0) | SIU Arena (4,758); Carbondale, IL |
| 01/14/2015; 7:05 pm | Illinois State | W 71–70 ^{OT} | 9–8 (5–0) | Hulman Center (4,335); Terre Haute, IN |
| 01/17/2015; 3:05 pm | at Drake | L 78–84 | 9–9 (5–1) | Knapp Center (3,283); Des Moines, IA |
| 01/21/2015; 8:00 pm, ESPN3 | at No. 20 Northern Iowa | L 60–66 | 9–10 (5–2) | McLeod Center (6,205); Cedar Falls, IA |
| 01/24/2015; 1:05 pm | Loyola (IL) | W 72–61 | 10–10 (6–2) | Hulman Center (5,496); Terre Haute, IN |
| 01/27/2015; 8:00 pm, ESPN3 | at Evansville | L 78–89 | 10–11 (6–3) | Fort Center (4,054); Evansville, IN |
| 01/31/2015; 1:05 pm | Bradley | W 64–58 | 11–11 (7–3) | Hulman Center (4,389); Terre Haute, IN |
| 02/03/2015; 7:05 pm | No. 14 Northern Iowa | L 51–61 | 11–12 (7–4) | Hulman Center (4,595); Terre Haute, IN |
| 02/07/2015; 1:05 pm | at Loyola (IL) | W 79–65 | 12–12 (8–4) | Joseph J. Gentile Arena (2,292); Chicago, IL |
| 02/11/2015; 8:00 pm, ESPN3 | at No. 15 Wichita State | L 57–74 | 12–13 (8–5) | Charles Koch Arena (10,506); Wichita, KS |
| 02/14/2015; 4:00 pm, ESPN3 | Drake | W 75–54 | 13–13 (9–5) | Hulman Center (4,250); Terre Haute, IN |
| 02/18/2015; 8:00 pm, ESPN3 | at Missouri State | L 56–60 | 13–14 (9–6) | JQH Arena (3,297); Springfield, MO |
| 02/21/2015; 1:05 pm, ESPN3 | Southern Illinois | W 78–58 | 14–14 (10–6) | Hulman Center (4,289); Terre Haute, IN |
| 02/25/2015; 7:05 pm, ESPN3 | No. 11 Wichita State | L 53–63 | 14–15 (10–7) | Hulman Center (6,169); Terre Haute, IN |
| 02/28/2015; 2:00 pm | at Bradley | W 60–52 | 15–15 (11–7) | Carver Arena (6,492); Peoria, IL |
Missouri Valley tournament
| 03/06/2015; 8:35 pm, MVC TV | vs. Loyola (IL); Quarterfinals | L 53–81 | 15–16 | Scottrade Center (8,114); St. Louis, MO |
*Non-conference game. ^{#}Rankings from AP Poll. (#) Tournament seedings in parentheses. All times are in Eastern Time.
