= 2014–15 Northern Iowa Panthers men's basketball team =

American college basketball season

2014–15 Northern Iowa Panthers men's basketball

Cancún Challenge champions Missouri Valley Tournament champions

NCAA tournament, second round
- Conference: Missouri Valley Conference

Ranking
- Coaches: No. 14
- AP: No. 11
- Record: 31–4 (16–2 MVC)
- Head coach: Ben Jacobson (9th season)
- Assistant coaches: Erik Crawford; Kyle Green; P.J. Hogan
- Home arena: McLeod Center

2014–15 Missouri Valley Conference men's basketball standings
	Conf.				Overall
Team	W		L	PCT	W		L	PCT
No. 14 Wichita State	17	–	1	.944	30	–	5	.857
No. 11 Northern Iowa †	16	–	2	.889	31	–	4	.886
Indiana State	11	–	7	.611	15	–	16	.484
Illinois State	11	–	7	.611	22	–	13	.629
Evansville	9	–	9	.500	24	–	12	.667
Loyola Chicago	8	–	10	.444	24	–	13	.649
Drake	6	–	12	.333	9	–	22	.290
Missouri State	5	–	13	.278	11	–	20	.355
Southern Illinois	4	–	14	.222	12	–	21	.364
Bradley	3	–	15	.167	9	–	24	.273
† 2015 MVC tournament winner Rankings from AP poll

The 2014–15 Northern Iowa Panthers men's basketball team represented the University of Northern Iowa during the 2014–15 NCAA Division I men's basketball season. The Panthers, led by ninth year head coach Ben Jacobson, played their home games at McLeod Center and were members of the Missouri Valley Conference (The Valley). They finished the season 31–4, 16–2 in MVC play to finish in second place. They defeated Bradley, Loyola–Chicago, and Illinois State to become champions of the Missouri Valley tournament. They received an automatic bid to the NCAA tournament where they defeated Wyoming in the second round before losing in the third round to Louisville.

== Previous season ==
The Panthers finished the season 16–15, 10–8 in MVC play to finish in third place. They lost in the quarterfinals of the Missouri Valley Conference tournament to Southern Illinois.

== Departures ==
Name	Number	Pos.	Height	Weight	Year	Hometown	Notes
Chip Rank	4	F	6'6"	235	Senior	Cedarburg, WI	Graduated
Nate Buchheit	15	G	6'4"	190	Junior	Pella, IA	Graduated
Matt Morrison	21	G	6'0"	180	Senior	Solon, IA	Graduated

=== Incoming transfers ===
Name	Number	Pos.	Height	Weight	Year	Hometown	Previous school
Kasey Semler	13	G	6'2"	190	Junior	Cedar Rapids, IA	Junior college transfer from Kirkwood Community College.

== Recruiting ==
College recruiting information
Name	Hometown	School	Height	Weight	Commit date
Wyatt Lohaus; PG	Iowa City, IA	West High School	6 ft 1 in (1.85 m)	180 lb (82 kg)	Aug 9, 2013
Wyatt Lohaus; PG	Recruit ratings: Scout: Rivals: (66)				
Overall recruit ranking:
Note: In many cases, Scout, Rivals, 247Sports, On3, and ESPN may conflict in their listings of height and weight.; In these cases, the average was taken. ESPN grades are on a 100-point scale.; Sources: "2014 Team Ranking". Rivals.

=== Class of 2015 recruits ===
College recruiting information
Name	Hometown	School	Height	Weight	Commit date
Luke McDonnell; PF	Dubuque, IA	Dubuque Senior High School	6 ft 8 in (2.03 m)	200 lb (91 kg)	Sep 18, 2013
Luke McDonnell; PF	Recruit ratings: Scout: Rivals: (NR)				
Spencer Haldeman; PG	Epworth, IA	Western Dubuque High School	6 ft 1 in (1.85 m)	N/A	May 12, 2014
Spencer Haldeman; PG	Recruit ratings: Scout: Rivals: (NR)				
Overall recruit ranking:
Note: In many cases, Scout, Rivals, 247Sports, On3, and ESPN may conflict in their listings of height and weight.; In these cases, the average was taken. ESPN grades are on a 100-point scale.; Sources: "2015 Team Ranking". Rivals.

== Roster ==
2014–15 Northern Iowa Panthers men's basketball team
Players
Coaches

Pos.	#	Name	Height	Weight	Year	Previous school	Hometown
G	1	Deon Mitchell	6 ft 1 in (1.85 m)	196 lb (89 kg)	Sr	Pflugerville	Pflugerville, TX
F	2	Klint Carlson	6 ft 7 in (2.01 m)	225 lb (102 kg)	RS Fr	Waverly-Shell Rock	Waverly, IA
C	3	Ted Friedman	6 ft 9 in (2.06 m)	245 lb (111 kg)	So	Ankeny	Ankeny, IA
G	4	Paul Jesperson	6 ft 6 in (1.98 m)	206 lb (93 kg)	RS Jr	Virginia; Merrill	Merrill, WI
G	5	Matt Bohannon	6 ft 4 in (1.93 m)	195 lb (88 kg)	Jr	Linn-Mar	Marion, IA
F	10	Seth Tuttle	6 ft 8 in (2.03 m)	240 lb (109 kg)	Sr	West Fork	Sheffield, IA
G	11	Wes Washpun	6 ft 1 in (1.85 m)	175 lb (79 kg)	Jr	Washington	Cedar Rapids, IA
F	12	Marvin Singleton	6 ft 6 in (1.98 m)	237 lb (108 kg)	Sr	Hopkins	Minneapolis, MN
G	13	Kasey Semler	6 ft 1 in (1.85 m)	200 lb (91 kg)	RS Jr	Kirkwood CC; Marion	Cedar Rapids, IA
F	14	Nate Buss	6 ft 9 in (2.06 m)	212 lb (96 kg)	Sr	Charles City	Charles City, IA
G	20	Jeremy Morgan	6 ft 5 in (1.96 m)	192 lb (87 kg)	So	Iowa City West	Coralville, IA
G	22	Robert Knar	6 ft 1 in (1.85 m)	180 lb (82 kg)	RS Fr	Mundelein	Mundelein, IL
G	23	Taylor Olson (redshirt)	6 ft 1 in (1.85 m)	193 lb (88 kg)	Jr	Kirkwood CC; Jefferson	Cedar Rapids, IA
G	24	Max Martino	6 ft 5 in (1.96 m)	215 lb (98 kg)	Sr	Kennedy	Cedar Rapids, IA
F	25	Bennett Koch	6 ft 9 in (2.06 m)	232 lb (105 kg)	RS Fr	Ashwaubenon	Ashwaubenon, WI
G	33	Wyatt Lohaus	6 ft 2 in (1.88 m)	185 lb (84 kg)	Fr	Iowa City West	North Liberty, IA

Head coach

- Ben Jacobson (North Dakota)

Assistant coach(es)

- Erik Crawford (Iowa State)
- Kyle Green (Hamline)
- P.J. Hogan (Morningside)

Legend

- (C) Team captain
- (S) Suspended
- (I) Ineligible
- (W) Walk-on
- Injured
- Current redshirt

Roster
Last update: 2014-07-25

== Schedule ==
Date time, TV	Rank^{#}	Opponent^{#}	Result	Record	Site (attendance) city, state
Exhibition
10/30/2014*; 7:00 pm		Upper Iowa	W 83–66		McLeod Center (3,825); Cedar Falls, IA
11/09/2014*; 1:00 pm		Bemidji State	W 64–45		McLeod Center (2,121); Cedar Falls, IA
Non-conference regular season
11/15/2014*; 1:00 pm		North Dakota	W 64–52	1–0	McLeod Center (3,716); Cedar Falls, IA
11/18/2014*; 8:00 am, ESPN2		at Stephen F. Austin; ESPN Tip-Off Marathon	W 79–77 ^{OT}	2–0	William R. Johnson Coliseum (7,096); Nacogdoches, TX
11/20/2014*; 7:00 pm		Morgan State; Cancún Challenge	W 73–53	3–0	McLeod Center (3,127); Cedar Falls, IA
11/22/2014*; 1:00 pm		North Florida; Cancún Challenge	W 66–49	4–0	McLeod Center (3,220); Cedar Falls, IA
11/25/2014*; 6:00 pm, CBSSN		vs. Virginia Tech; Cancún Challenge semifinals	W 73–54	5–0	Hard Rock Hotel Riviera Maya (650); Cancún, MX
11/26/2014*; 2:00 pm, CBSSN		vs. Northwestern; Cancún Challenge championship	W 61–42	6–0	Hard Rock Hotel Riviera Maya (650); Cancún, MX
11/30/2014*; 2:00 pm		Richmond	W 55–50	7–0	McLeod Center (3,081); Cedar Falls, IA
12/06/2014*; 7:00 pm		George Mason	W 71–65 ^{OT}	8–0	McLeod Center (4,525); Cedar Falls, IA
12/10/2014*; 8:00 pm	No. 23	at Denver	W 65–55	9–0	Magness Arena (1,545); Denver, CO
12/13/2014*; 6:00 pm, NBCSN	No. 23	at VCU	L 87–93 ^{2OT}	9–1	Siegel Center (7,637); Richmond, VA
12/20/2014*; 6:30 pm, BTN		vs. Iowa; Big Four Classic	W 56–44	10–1	Wells Fargo Arena (15,124); Des Moines, IA
12/28/2014*; 2:00 pm	No. 23	South Dakota State	W 74–63	11–1	McLeod Center (6,333); Cedar Falls, IA
Missouri Valley Conference Regular season
01/01/2015; 7:00 pm, ESPN3	No. 23	at Evansville	L 49–52	11–2 (0–1)	Ford Center (5,151); Evansville, IN
01/04/2015; 2:30 pm, ESPN3	No. 23	Loyola–Chicago	W 67–58	12–2 (1–1)	McLeod Center (5,111); Cedar Falls, IA
01/07/2015; 7:00 pm, KCRG		Southern Illinois	W 55–39	13–2 (2–1)	McLeod Center (3,910); Cedar Falls, IA
01/10/2015; 3:00 pm, MVC TV		at Drake	W 64–40	14–2 (3–1)	Knapp Center (4,780); Des Moines, IA
01/13/2015; 7:00 pm	No. 23	at Bradley	W 63–52	15–2 (4–1)	Carver Arena (5,129); Peoria, IL
01/18/2015; 3:00 pm, ESPNU	No. 23	Missouri State	W 60–46	16–2 (5–1)	McLeod Center (4,941); Cedar Falls, IA
01/21/2015; 7:00 pm, ESPN3	No. 20	Indiana State	W 66–60	17–2 (6–1)	McLeod Center (6,205); Cedar Falls, IA
01/25/2015; 3:00 pm, ESPNU	No. 20	at Illinois State	W 54–53	18–2 (7–1)	Redbird Arena (6,118); Normal, IL
01/28/2015; 7:00 pm	No. 18	at Southern Illinois	W 59–52	19–2 (8–1)	SIU Arena (5,267); Carbondale, IL
01/31/2015; 3:00 pm, ESPN2	No. 18	No. 12 Wichita State	W 70–54	20–2 (9–1)	McLeod Center (7,050); Cedar Falls, IA
02/03/2015; 6:00 pm	No. 14	at Indiana State	W 61–51	21–2 (10–1)	Hulman Center (4,595); Terre Haute, IN
02/07/2015; 7:00 pm, KCRG/CSN Chicago	No. 14	Drake	W 69–53	22–2 (11–1)	McLeod Center (6,650); Cedar Falls, IA
02/11/2015; 7:00 pm, ESPN3	No. 13	Illinois State	W 83–64	23–2 (12–1)	McLeod Center (6,103); Cedar Falls, IA
02/15/2015; 3:00 pm, ESPNU	No. 13	at Missouri State	W 68–57	24–2 (13–1)	JQH Arena (5,452); Springfield, MO
02/18/2015; 7:00 pm, ESPN3	No. 11	at Loyola–Chicago	W 58–39	25–2 (14–1)	Joseph J. Gentile Arena (1,725); Chicago, IL
02/21/2015; 3:00 pm, MVC TV	No. 11	Bradley	W 56–39	26–2 (15–1)	McLeod Center (6,650); Cedar Falls, IA
02/25/2015; 8:00 pm, MVC TV	No. 10	Evansville	W 68–57	27–2 (16–1)	McLeod Center (6,935); Cedar Falls, IA
02/28/2015; 2:00 pm, ESPN	No. 10	at No. 11 Wichita State; ESPN College GameDay	L 60–74	27–3 (16–2)	Charles Koch Arena (10,506); Wichita, KS
Missouri Valley tournament
03/06/2015; 6:05 pm, MVC TV/ESPN3	(2) No. 11	vs. (10) Bradley; Quarterfinals	W 71–46	28–3	Scottrade Center (N/A); St. Louis, MO
03/07/2015; 4:05 pm, MVC TV/ESPN3	(2) No. 11	vs. (6) Loyola–Chicago; Semifinals	W 63–49	29–3	Scottrade Center (13,898); St. Louis, MO
03/08/2015; 1:05 pm, CBS	(2) No. 11	vs. (4) Illinois State; Championship game	W 69–60	30–3	Scottrade Center (13,552); St. Louis, MO
NCAA tournament
03/20/2015*; 12:40 pm, TBS	(5 E) No. 11	vs. (12 E) Wyoming; Second round	W 71–54	31–3	KeyArena (14,509); Seattle, WA
03/22/2015*; 8:40 pm, TBS	(5 E) No. 11	vs. (4 E) No. 17 Louisville; Third round	L 53–66	31–4	KeyArena (14,901); Seattle, WA
*Non-conference game. ^{#}Rankings from AP Poll. (#) Tournament seedings in parentheses. All times are in Central Time. (#) during NCAA Tournament is seed with Region E=East.

== Rankings ==
Ranking movement Legend: ██ Improvement in ranking. ██ Decrease in ranking. ██NR = Not ranked. RV = Receiving votes.
Poll	Pre- Season	Week 2	Week 3	Week 4	Week 5	Week 6	Week 7	Week 8	Week 9	Week 10	Week 11	Week 12	Week 13	Week 14	Week 15	Week 16	Week 17	Week 18	Week 19	Final
AP	NR	RV	RV	RV	23	RV	23	23	RV	23	20	18	14	13	11	10	11	10	11	N/A
Coaches	NR	NR	RV	RV	24	RV	24	23	23	22	19	18	15	12	11	10	12	11	9	14
Mid-Major	5	4	4	3	3	4	3	2	3	3	3	3	2	2	2	2	3	2	-	
