= 2014–15 Saint Louis Billikens men's basketball team =

American college basketball season

2014–15 Saint Louis Billikens men's basketball
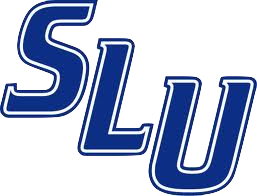
- Conference: Atlantic 10 Conference
- Record: 11–21 (3–15 A-10)
- Head coach: Jim Crews (2nd season)
- Assistant coaches: Tanner Bronson; Calbert Cheaney; Jim Platt
- Home arena: Chaifetz Arena

2014–15 Atlantic 10 men's basketball standings
	Conf.				Overall
Team	W		L	PCT	W		L	PCT
Davidson	14	–	4	.778	24	–	8	.750
Dayton	13	–	5	.722	27	–	9	.750
Rhode Island	13	–	5	.722	23	–	10	.697
VCU †	12	–	6	.667	26	–	10	.722
Richmond	12	–	6	.667	21	–	14	.600
George Washington	10	–	8	.556	22	–	13	.629
St. Bonaventure	10	–	8	.556	18	–	13	.581
UMass	10	–	8	.556	17	–	15	.531
La Salle	8	–	10	.444	17	–	16	.515
Saint Joseph's	7	–	11	.389	13	–	18	.419
Duquesne	6	–	12	.333	12	–	19	.387
Fordham	4	–	14	.222	10	–	21	.323
George Mason	4	–	14	.222	9	–	22	.290
Saint Louis	3	–	15	.167	11	–	21	.344
† 2015 A10 tournament winner Rankings from AP poll

The 2014–15 Saint Louis Billikens men's basketball team represented Saint Louis University in the 2014–15 NCAA Division I men's basketball season. The Billikens were led by their head coach Jim Crews who served his second season at Saint Louis. The team played their home games at Chaifetz Arena. They were a member of the Atlantic 10 Conference. The Bilikens proceeded to complete their best to worst season.

The season was the 100th in Saint Louis men's basketball history.

== Previous season ==
The Billikens finished the season with an overall record of 27–7, with a record of 13–3 in the Atlantic 10 regular season to win the regular season conference championship. In the 2014 Atlantic 10 tournament, the Billikens lost to St. Bonaventure in the quarterfinals. They received an at-large bid to the NCAA tournament where they defeated NC State in the first round before losing in the second round to Louisville.

== Off season ==
=== Departures ===
Name	Number	Pos.	Height	Weight	Year	Hometown	Notes
Jordair Jett	5	G	6'1"	215	Senior	St. Paul, MN	Graduated
Mike McCall Jr.	11	G	6'0"	180	Senior	Chicago, IL	Graduated
Dwayne Evans	22	F	6'5"	230	Senior	Bolingbrook, IL	Graduated
Jake Barnett	30	F	6'5"	195	Senior	Wauwatosa, WI	Graduated
Robert Loe	51	F	6'11"	245	Senior	Auckland, NZ	Graduated

== Incoming recruits ==
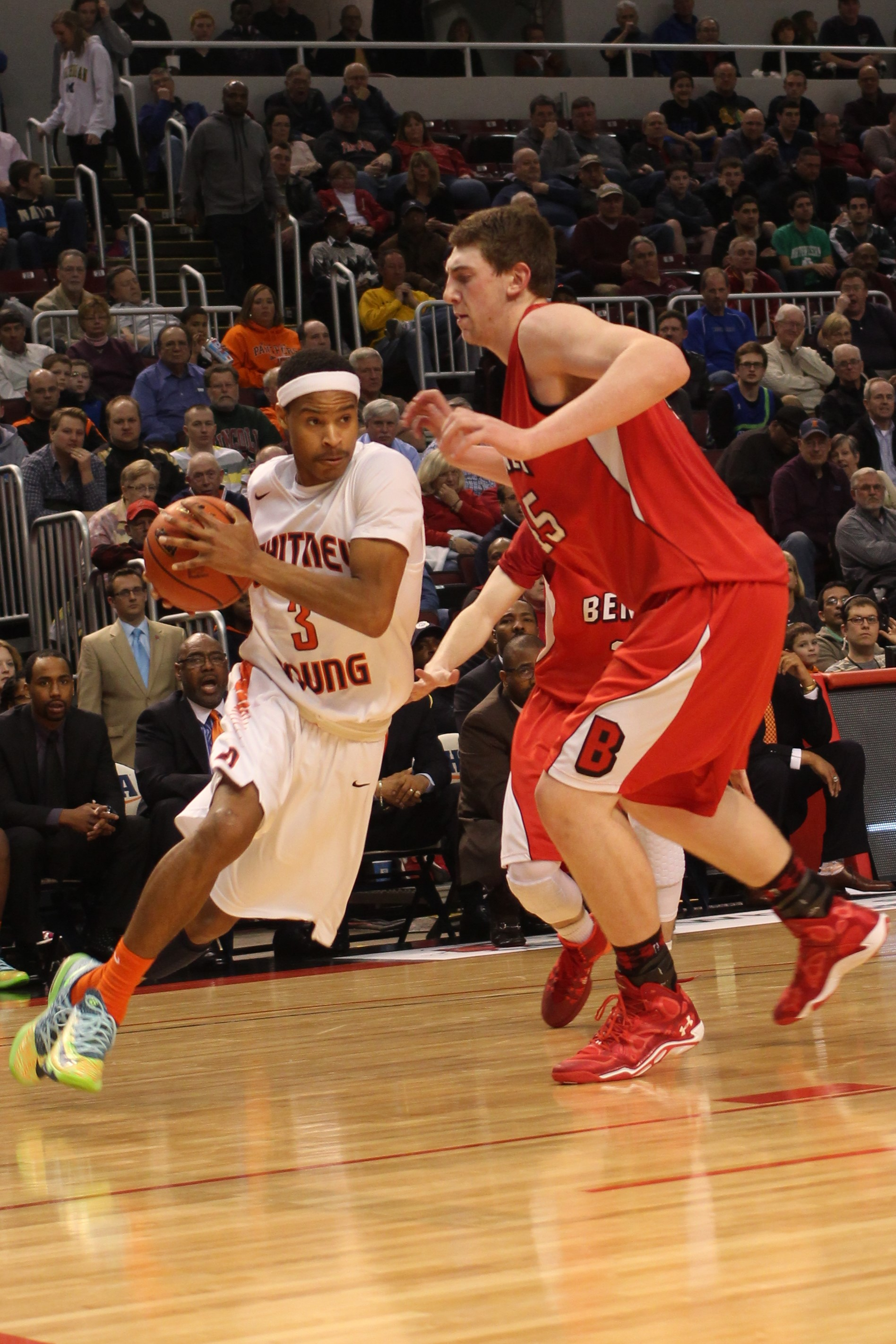
Incoming freshman Miles Reynolds helped Whitney Young High School win the 2014 IHSA Class 4A championship.

College recruiting information
Name	Hometown	School	Height	Weight	Commit date
Brett Jolly; C	Southlake, TX	Blair Academy	6 ft 10 in (2.08 m)	220 lb (100 kg)	Oct 21, 2013
Brett Jolly; C	Recruit ratings: Scout: Rivals: (75)				
Davell Roby; SG	Memphis, TN	White Station High School	6 ft 4 in (1.93 m)	200 lb (91 kg)	Jun 30, 2013
Davell Roby; SG	Recruit ratings: Scout: Rivals: (74)				
Austin Gillman; C	Saint Louis, MO	Oakville High School	6 ft 11 in (2.11 m)	200 lb (91 kg)	Jul 3, 2013
Austin Gillman; C	Recruit ratings: Scout: Rivals: (71)				
Milik Yarbrough; PF	Zion, IL	Zion-Benton High School	6 ft 5 in (1.96 m)	220 lb (100 kg)	Apr 16, 2014
Milik Yarbrough; PF	Recruit ratings: Scout: Rivals: (70)				
Miles Reynolds; PG	Chicago, IL	Whitney Young High School	6 ft 2 in (1.88 m)	170 lb (77 kg)	Oct 23, 2013
Miles Reynolds; PG	Recruit ratings: Scout: Rivals: (69)				
Marcus Bartley; PG	Decatur, IL	Douglas MacArthur High School	6 ft 4 in (1.93 m)	160 lb (73 kg)	Sep 12, 2013
Marcus Bartley; PG	Recruit ratings: Scout: Rivals: (69)				
Elliott Welmer; PF	Columbus, IN	Columbus North High School	6 ft 8 in (2.03 m)	215 lb (98 kg)	Dec 4, 2013
Elliott Welmer; PF	Recruit ratings: Scout: Rivals: (N/A)				
Overall recruit ranking:
Note: In many cases, Scout, Rivals, 247Sports, On3, and ESPN may conflict in their listings of height and weight.; In these cases, the average was taken. ESPN grades are on a 100-point scale.; Sources: "2014 Team Ranking". Rivals.

== Roster ==
2014–15 Saint Louis Billikens men's basketball team
Players
Coaches

Pos.	#	Name	Height	Weight	Year	Previous school	Hometown
G	0	Marcus Bartley	6 ft 4 in (1.93 m)	170 lb (77 kg)	Fr	Douglas MacArthur	Decatur, IL
F	1	Grandy Glaze	6 ft 6 in (1.98 m)	235 lb (107 kg)	Sr	Notre Dame Prep	Toronto, ON
G	2	Austin McBroom	5 ft 9 in (1.75 m)	165 lb (75 kg)	Jr	Campbell Hall; Central Michigan	North Hollywood, CA
G	3	Ash Yacoubou	6 ft 4 in (1.93 m)	210 lb (95 kg)	RS Jr	Long Island Lutheran; Villanova	Bronx, NY
F	4	Milik Yarbrough	6 ft 6 in (1.98 m)	230 lb (104 kg)	Fr	Zion-Benton	Zion, IL
G	5	Davell Roby	6 ft 4 in (1.93 m)	200 lb (91 kg)	Fr	White Station	Memphis, TN
G	10	Aaron Hines (W)	6 ft 0 in (1.83 m)	175 lb (79 kg)	So	Parkway North	St. Louis, MO
G	11	Miles Reynolds	6 ft 2 in (1.88 m)	170 lb (77 kg)	Fr	Whitney Young	Chicago, IL
G	12	Stephen Leazer (W)	6 ft 4 in (1.93 m)	180 lb (82 kg)	Fr	Northridge Prep	Mt. Prospect, IL
C	14	Brett Jolly	6 ft 9 in (2.06 m)	230 lb (104 kg)	Fr	Blair Academy	Southlake, TX
F	15	Tanner Lancona	6 ft 8 in (2.03 m)	230 lb (104 kg)	So	Tesoro	Trabuco Canyon, CA
G	22	Grant Hollander (W)	6 ft 3 in (1.91 m)	175 lb (79 kg)	Fr	Chaminade	St. Charles, MO
C	25	Austin Gillman	6 ft 10 in (2.08 m)	210 lb (95 kg)	Fr	Oakville	St. Louis, MO
G	32	Mike Crawford	6 ft 4 in (1.93 m)	200 lb (91 kg)	So	Tipton	Tipton, IN
G	33	Royce Simpson (W)	6 ft 2 in (1.88 m)	180 lb (82 kg)	So	Marist	Chicago, IL
F	35	Reggie Agbeko	6 ft 7 in (2.01 m)	240 lb (109 kg)	So	South Kent School	Buffalo, NY
C	54	John Manning	6 ft 11 in (2.11 m)	240 lb (109 kg)	Sr	Chantilly	Chantilly, VA

Head coach

- Jim Crews (Indiana)

Assistant coach(es)

- Calbert Cheaney (Indiana)
- Tanner Bronson (Wisconsin)
- Jim Platt (Concordia–Chicago)

Legend

- (C) Team captain
- (S) Suspended
- (I) Ineligible
- (W) Walk-on
- Injured
- Current redshirt

Roster

== 100 Years celebration ==
SLU celebrated the 100th season of Billiken basketball by announced their All-Century team. The team would be honored at halftime of their February 22 game against La Salle:

Players:

- Anthony Bonner (1986–1990)
- Dick Boushka (1951–1954)
- Erwin Claggett (1991–1995)
- Monroe Douglass (1985–1989)
- Dwayne Evans (2010–2014)
- Bob Ferry (1956–1959)
- Roland Gray (1985–1989)
- Scott Highmark (1991–1995)
- Larry Hughes (1997–1998)
- Jordair Jett (2010–2014)
- Kevin Lisch (2005–2009)
- Ed Macauley (1945–1949)
- Dan Miller (1945–1948)
- Jack Mimlitz (1955–1958)
- Kwamain Mitchell (2008–2013)
- Joe Wiley (1967–1970)

Coaches:

- Eddie Hickey (1947–1958)
- Rick Majerus (2007–2012)
- Charlie Spoonhour (1992–1999)

== Schedule ==
Date time, TV	Rank^{#}	Opponent^{#}	Result	Record	Site (attendance) city, state
Exhibition
11/04/2014*; 7:00 pm		Harris–Stowe	W 86–59		Chaifetz Arena; St. Louis, MO
Non-conference regular season
11/15/2014*; 7:00 pm, FSMW+		Southern Illinois	W 62–59	1–0	Chaifetz Arena (10,015); St. Louis, MO
11/18/2014*; 6:00 pm		at Indiana State	W 69–56	2–0	Hulman Center (4,348); Terre Haute, IN
11/23/2014*; 1:00 pm, FSMW		Texas A&M–Corpus Christi; Corpus Christi Coastal Classic	L 56–62	2–1	Chaifetz Arena (6,620); St. Louis, MO
11/25/2014*; 7:00 pm, FSMW+		North Carolina A&T; Corpus Christi Coastal Classic	W 57–54	3–1	Chaifetz Arena (4,507); St. Louis, MO
11/28/2014*; 8:30 pm, CBSSN		vs. Mississippi State; Corpus Christi Coastal Classic semifinals	L 50–75	3–2	American Bank Center (N/A); Corpus Christi, TX
11/29/2014*; 3:00 pm, CBSSN		vs. Bradley; Corpus Christi Coastal Classic 3rd place game	W 60–57	4–2	American Bank Center (N/A); Corpus Christi, TX
12/02/2014*; 7:00 pm, FSMW		Rockhurst	W 80–48	5–2	Chaifetz Arena (5,290); St. Louis, MO
12/06/2014*; 5:00 pm, FSMW		at No. 8 Wichita State	L 52–81	5–3	Intrust Bank Arena (15,004); Wichita, KS
12/09/2014*; 7:00 pm, FSMW		South Dakota State	L 55–62	5–4	Chaifetz Arena (5,102); St. Louis, MO
12/13/2014*; 6:00 pm, FSMW		SIU Edwardsville	W 67–61	6–4	Chaifetz Arena (6,032); St. Louis, MO
12/17/2014*; 7:00 pm, FSMW		Texas–Pan American	W 75–69	7–4	Chaifetz Arena (5,173); St. Louis, MO
12/21/2014*; 1:00 pm, FSMW		Vermont	W 58–55	8–4	Chaifetz Arena (6,818); St. Louis, MO
12/31/2014*; 1:00 pm, FSMW		Vanderbilt	L 55–70	8–5	Chaifetz Arena (8,194); St. Louis, MO
Atlantic 10 regular season
01/03/2015; 2:00 pm, NBCSN		Rhode Island	L 53–65	8–6 (0–1)	Chaifetz Arena (8,677); St. Louis, MO
01/06/2015; 6:00 pm, CBSSN		at George Washington	L 72–75	8–7 (0–2)	Charles E. Smith Center (2,734); Washington, D.C.
01/10/2015; 6:00 pm		at Davidson	L 54–89	8–8 (0–3)	John M. Belk Arena (3,609); Davidson, NC
01/14/2015; 7:00 pm, FSMW		Duquesne	W 78–69	9–8 (1–3)	Chaifetz Arena (6,530); St. Louis, MO
01/17/2015; 11:30 am, NBCSN		at Dayton	L 45–61	9–9 (1–4)	UD Arena (13,455); Dayton, OH
01/23/2015; 6:00 pm, ESPN2		No. 16 VCU	L 61–63	9–10 (1–5)	Chaifetz Arena (9,643); St. Louis, MO
01/29/2015; 6:00 pm, FSMW+		at George Mason	L 60–68	9–11 (1–6)	Patriot Center (3,822); Fairfax, VA
01/31/2015; 3:00 pm, CBSSN		Massachusetts	L 56–60	9–12 (1–7)	Chaifetz Arena (9,104); St. Louis, MO
02/03/2015; 6:30 pm, CBSSN		Saint Joseph's	W 68–61 ^{OT}	10–12 (2–7)	Chaifetz Arena (6,953); St. Louis, MO
02/07/2015; 3:00 pm, NBCSN		at Fordham	L 65–83	10–13 (2–8)	Rose Hill Gymnasium (2,871); Bronx, NY
02/10/2015; 8:30 pm, CBSSN		Dayton	L 44–51	10–14 (2–9)	Chaifetz Arena (8,093); St. Louis, MO
02/14/2015; 1:00 pm, FSMW+		at Rhode Island	L 68–81	10–15 (2–10)	Ryan Center (5,314); Kingston, RI
02/17/2015; 6:30 pm, CBSSN		at No. 25 VCU	L 54–74	10–16 (2–11)	Siegel Center (7,637); Richmond, VA
02/22/2015; 1:30 pm, NBCSN		La Salle	W 68–64 ^{OT}	11–16 (3–11)	Chaifetz Arena (7,980); St. Louis, MO
02/25/2015; 6:00 pm		at Duquesne	L 66–79	11–17 (3–12)	Palumbo Center (2,008); Pittsburgh, PA
02/28/2015; 6:00 pm, FSMW		George Mason	L 50–78	11–18 (3–13)	Chaifetz Arena (5,828); St. Louis, MO
03/04/2015; 7:00 pm, FSMW		St. Bonaventure	L 48–64	11–19 (3–14)	Chaifetz Arena (6,017); St. Louis, MO
03/07/2015; 7:00 pm, FSMW+		at Richmond	L 51–67	11–20 (3–15)	Robins Center (7,201); Richmond, VA
Atlantic 10 tournament
03/11/2015; 9:00 pm, SNY		vs. Duquesne; First Round	L 55–61	11–21	Barclays Center; Brooklyn, NY
*Non-conference game. ^{#}Rankings from AP Poll. (#) Tournament seedings in parentheses. All times are in Central Time.
