= 2014–15 Loyola Ramblers men's basketball team =

American college basketball season

2014–15 Loyola Ramblers men's basketball

Las Vegas Classic champions College Basketball Invitational champions
- Conference: Missouri Valley Conference
- Record: 24–13 (8–10 The Valley)
- Head coach: Porter Moser (4th season)
- Assistant coaches: Daniyal Robinson; Emanuel Dildy; Matt Gordon
- Home arena: Joseph J. Gentile Arena

2014–15 Missouri Valley Conference men's basketball standings
	Conf.				Overall
Team	W		L	PCT	W		L	PCT
No. 14 Wichita State	17	–	1	.944	30	–	5	.857
No. 11 Northern Iowa †	16	–	2	.889	31	–	4	.886
Indiana State	11	–	7	.611	15	–	16	.484
Illinois State	11	–	7	.611	22	–	13	.629
Evansville	9	–	9	.500	24	–	12	.667
Loyola Chicago	8	–	10	.444	24	–	13	.649
Drake	6	–	12	.333	9	–	22	.290
Missouri State	5	–	13	.278	11	–	20	.355
Southern Illinois	4	–	14	.222	12	–	21	.364
Bradley	3	–	15	.167	9	–	24	.273
† 2015 MVC tournament winner Rankings from AP poll

The 2014–15 Loyola Ramblers men's basketball team represented Loyola University Chicago during the 2014–15 NCAA Division I men's basketball season. The Ramblers, led by fourth-year head coach Porter Moser, played their home games at the Joseph J. Gentile Arena and were members of the Missouri Valley Conference. They finished the season 24–13, 8–10 in MVC play to finish in sixth place. They advanced to the semifinals of the Missouri Valley tournament, where they lost to Northern Iowa. They were invited to the College Basketball Invitational, where they defeated Rider, Oral Roberts, and Seattle to advance to the best-of-three finals series against Louisiana–Monroe. They defeated Louisiana–Monroe 2 games to 0 to become the CBI champions.

== Previous season ==
The Loyola finished the season 10–22, 4–14 in MVC play to finish in last place. They advanced to the quarterfinals of the Missouri Valley tournament, where they lost to Indiana State.

== Roster ==
Number	Name	Position	Height	Weight	Year	Hometown
0	Donte Ingram	Guard/forward	6–6	215	Freshman	Chicago, Illinois
2	Earl Peterson	Guard	6–3	180	Junior	Raytown, Missouri
4	Devon Turk	Guard	6–4	195	Junior	Houston, Texas
5	Joe Crisman	Guard	6–4	200	Senior	Munster, Indiana
10	Jay Knuth	Forward	6–6	205	Freshman	Johnston, Iowa
13	London Dokubo	Guard	6–0	170	Senior	Schaumburg, Illinois
14	Ben Richardson	Guard	6–3	185	Freshman	Overland Park, Kansas
22	Eric Porter	Guard	5–11	165	Freshman	Deerfield, Illinois
23	Jeff White	Guard	6–1	185	Junior	Peoria, Illinois
24	Montel James	Forward	6–7	220	Junior	Kenner, Louisiana
32	Christian Thomas	Guard/forward	6–5	220	Senior	St. Louis, Missouri
34	Cal Kennedy	Forward	6–6	210	Freshman	Oak Lawn, Illinois
35	Milton Doyle	Guard	6–4	185	Sophomore	Chicago, Illinois

== Schedule ==
Date time, TV	Opponent	Result	Record	Site (attendance) city, state
Regular season
11/14/2014*; 7:30 pm	Rockhurst	W 71–58	1–0	Joseph J. Gentile Arena (1,570); Chicago, IL
11/17/2014*; 7:00 pm	McKendree	W 78–68	2–0	Joseph J. Gentile Arena (913); Chicago, IL
11/21/2014*; 6:00 pm, BTN	at No. 19 Michigan State	L 52–87	2–1	Breslin Center (14,797); East Lansing, MI
11/25/2014*; 7:00 pm, CSNCH	at UTSA	W 71–57	3–1	Convocation Center (829); San Antonio, TX
11/29/2014*; 6:00 pm	at Kent State	W 69–61	4–1	MAC Center (1,937); Kent, OH
12/03/2014*; 7:00 pm	Tulane	L 70–83	4–2	Joseph J. Gentile Arena (1,378); Chicago, IL
12/06/2014*; 1:00 pm, ESPN3	at UIC	W 77–67	5–2	UIC Pavilion (5,449); Chicago, IL
12/13/2014*; 7:00 pm	Jackson State	W 58–46	6–2	Joseph J. Gentile Arena (1,163); Chicago, IL
12/17/2014*; 7:00 pm	Abilene Christian; Las Vegas Classic	W 83–44	7–2	Joseph J. Gentile Arena (1,015); Chicago, IL
12/19/2014*; 7:00 pm	Southern Utah; Las Vegas Classic	W 73–57	8–2	Joseph J. Gentile Arena (1,119); Chicago, IL
12/22/2014*; 7:00 pm	vs. Texas Tech; Las Vegas Classic semifinals	W 62–44	9–2	Orleans Arena (N/A); Paradise, NV
12/23/2014*; 8:30 pm, FS1	vs. Boise State; Las Vegas Classic championship	W 48–45	10–2	Orleans Arena (N/A); Paradise, NV
Missouri Valley Conference regular season
12/31/2014; 1:00 pm	Bradley	W 64–49	11–2 (1–0)	Joseph J. Gentile Arena (1,889); Chicago, IL
01/04/2015; 2:30 pm, ESPN3	at No. 23 Northern Iowa	L 58–67	11–3 (1–1)	McLeod Center (5,111); Cedar Falls, IA
01/07/2015; 7:00 pm, CSN Chicago	at Evansville	W 71–70	12–3 (2–1)	Ford Center (4,321); Evansville, IN
01/11/2015; 4:00 pm, ESPNU	No. 15 Wichita State	L 53–67	12–4 (2–2)	Joseph J. Gentile Arena (4,058); Chicago, IL
01/14/2015; 7:00 pm, ESPN3	Drake	W 50–47	13–4 (3–2)	Joseph J. Gentile Arena (1,572); Chicago, IL
01/18/2015; 3:00 pm, ESPN3	at Southern Illinois	L 52–59	13–5 (3–3)	SIU Arena (4,874); Carbondale, IL
01/21/2015; 7:00 pm	Evansville	L 56–65	13–6 (3–4)	Joseph J. Gentile Arena (1,278); Chicago, IL
01/24/2015; 12:00 pm	at Indiana State	L 61–72	13–7 (3–5)	Hulman Center (5,496); Terre Haute, IN
01/28/2015; 7:00 pm	at No. 12 Wichita State	L 47–58	13–8 (3–6)	Charles Koch Arena (10,506); Wichita, KS
01/31/2015; 1:00 pm, CSN Chicago	Illinois State	L 45–48	13–9 (3–7)	Joseph J. Gentile Arena (3,256); Chicago, IL
02/04/2015; 8:00 pm, CSN Chicago	at Missouri State	W 53–50	14–9 (4–7)	JQH Arena (3,218); Springfield, MO
02/07/2015; 3:00 pm	Indiana State	L 65–79	14–10 (4–8)	Joseph J. Gentile Arena (2,292); Chicago, IL
02/11/2015; 7:00 pm, CSN Chicago	Southern Illinois	W 66–62	15–10 (5–8)	Joseph J. Gentile Arena (2,136); Chicago, IL
02/15/2015; 1:00 pm, ESPN3	at Bradley	W 58–53	16–10 (6–8)	Carver Arena (5,825); Peoria, IL
02/18/2015; 7:00 pm, ESPN3	No. 11 Northern Iowa	L 39–58	16–11 (6–9)	Joseph J. Gentile Arena (1,725); Chicago, IL
02/21/2015; 7:00 pm	at Illinois State	L 60–67	16–12 (6–10)	Redbird Arena (6,406); Normal, IL
02/25/2015; 7:00 pm	at Drake	W 80–75 ^{OT}	17–12 (7–10)	Knapp Center (3,271); Des Moines, IA
02/28/2015; 3:00 pm, ESPN3	Missouri State	W 65–51	18–12 (8–10)	Joseph J. Gentile Arena (1,989); Chicago, IL
Missouri Valley tournament
03/06/2015; 8:35 pm, MVC TV	vs. Indiana State; Quarterfinals	W 81–53	19–12	Scottrade Center (8,114); St. Louis, MO
03/07/2015; 4:05 pm, MVC TV	vs. No. 11 Northern Iowa; Semifinals	L 49–63	19–13	Scottrade Center (13,898); St. Louis, MO
College Basketball Invitational
03/17/2015*; 7:00 pm, ESPN3	Rider; First round	W 62–59	20–13	Joseph J. Gentile Arena (1,105); Chicago, IL
03/23/2015*; 7:00 pm, ESPN3	Oral Roberts; Quarterfinals	W 86–78	21–13	Joseph J. Gentile Arena (1,225); Chicago, IL
03/25/2015*; 7:00 pm, ESPN3	Seattle; Semifinals	W 63–48	22–13	Joseph J. Gentile Arena (1,265); Chicago, IL
03/30/2015*; 7:00 pm, CBSSN	Louisiana–Monroe; Finals–Game 1	W 65–58	23–13	Joseph J. Gentile Arena (2,215); Chicago, IL
04/01/2015*; 7:00 pm, CBSSN	at Louisiana–Monroe; Finals–Game 2	W 63–62	24–13	Fant–Ewing Coliseum (4,460); Monroe, LA
*Non-conference game. ^{#}Rankings from Coaches' Poll. (#) Tournament seedings in parentheses. All times are in Central Time.
