= 2014–15 Evansville Purple Aces men's basketball team =

American college basketball season

2014–15 Evansville Purple Aces men's basketball

CIT champions
- Conference: Missouri Valley Conference
- Record: 24–12 (9–9 The Valley)
- Head coach: Marty Simmons (8th season)
- Assistant coaches: Jimmy Elgas; Carson Harris; Geoff Alexander
- Home arena: Ford Center

2014–15 Missouri Valley Conference men's basketball standings
	Conf.				Overall
Team	W		L	PCT	W		L	PCT
No. 14 Wichita State	17	–	1	.944	30	–	5	.857
No. 11 Northern Iowa †	16	–	2	.889	31	–	4	.886
Indiana State	11	–	7	.611	15	–	16	.484
Illinois State	11	–	7	.611	22	–	13	.629
Evansville	9	–	9	.500	24	–	12	.667
Loyola Chicago	8	–	10	.444	24	–	13	.649
Drake	6	–	12	.333	9	–	22	.290
Missouri State	5	–	13	.278	11	–	20	.355
Southern Illinois	4	–	14	.222	12	–	21	.364
Bradley	3	–	15	.167	9	–	24	.273
† 2015 MVC tournament winner Rankings from AP poll

The 2014–15 Evansville Purple Aces men's basketball team represented the University of Evansville during the 2014–15 NCAA Division I men's basketball season. The Purple Aces, led by eighth year head coach Marty Simmons, played their home games at the Ford Center and were members of the Missouri Valley Conference. They finished the season 24–12, 9–9 in MVC play to finish in fifth place. They lost in the quarterfinals of the Missouri Valley tournament to Illinois State. They were invited to the CollegeInsider.com Tournament where they defeated IPFW, Eastern Illinois, Louisiana–Lafayette, UT Martin, and Northern Arizona to become CIT champions.

== Previous season ==
The Purple Aces finished the season 14–19, 6–12 in MVC play to finish in a tie for eighth place. They advanced to the quarterfinals of the Missouri Valley tournament where they lost to Wichita State.

== Departures ==
Name	Number	Pos.	Height	Weight	Year	Hometown	Notes
Ryan Sawvell	0	F/C	6'8"	200	Junior	Mundelein, IL	Transferred to Wofford
Tyler Ptacek	22	G	6'3"	175	Freshman	Parma, OH	Transferred
Mike Leazer	23	G	6'3"	170	Sophomore	Mount Prospect, IL	Transferred to Wisconsin–Parkside
Rokas Cesnulevicius	25	F/C	6'8"	215	Junior	Alytus, Lithuania	Injured

=== Incoming transfers ===
Name	Number	Pos.	Height	Weight	Year	Hometown	Previous School
Taylor Stafford	1	G	6'0"	170	Junior	Duluth, MN	Junior college transfer from Eastern Arizona College.
Sergej Vucetic	14	C	7'1"	236	Junior	Vrbas, Serbia	Transferred from Nebraska. Under NCAA transfer rules, Vucetic will have to redshirt for the 2014–15 season. Will have two years of remaining eligibility.
Willie Wiley	22	F	6'7"	210	Junior	Springfield, IL	Junior college transfer from Vincennes.

=== Class of 2015 recruits ===
College recruiting information
Name	Hometown	School	Height	Weight	Commit date
Dainius Chatkevicius; PF	Orlando, FL	West Oaks Academy	6 ft 9 in (2.06 m)	245 lb (111 kg)	N/A
Dainius Chatkevicius; PF	Recruit ratings: Scout: Rivals: (NR)				
Overall recruit ranking:
Note: In many cases, Scout, Rivals, 247Sports, On3, and ESPN may conflict in their listings of height and weight.; In these cases, the average was taken. ESPN grades are on a 100-point scale.; Sources: "2015 Team Ranking". Rivals.

== Roster ==
2014–15 Evansville Purple Aces men's basketball team
Players
Coaches

Pos.	#	Name	Height	Weight	Year	Previous school	Hometown
G	1	Taylor Stafford	6 ft 1 in (1.85 m)	170 lb (77 kg)	Jr	Eastern Arizona College	Duluth, MN
G	2	Christian Benzon	6 ft 4 in (1.93 m)	195 lb (88 kg)	So	The Rock School	Gainesville, FL
G	3	Jaylon Brown	6 ft 0 in (1.83 m)	185 lb (84 kg)	So	Fishers	Fishers, IN
G	4	Duane Gibson	6 ft 3 in (1.91 m)	195 lb (88 kg)	So	Villa Angela-St. Joseph	Cleveland, OH
G	5	Mislav Brzoja	6 ft 4 in (1.93 m)	215 lb (98 kg)	RS So	Villanova	Zagreb, Croatia
F/C	10	Jaylon Moore	6 ft 7 in (2.01 m)	230 lb (104 kg)	Sr	Olive Branch	Olive Branch, MS
G	12	Adam Wing	6 ft 4 in (1.93 m)	205 lb (93 kg)	Jr	Rowan County	Morehead, KY
C	14	Sergej Vucetic (redshirt)	7 ft 1 in (2.16 m)	238 lb (108 kg)	Jr	Nebraska	Vrbas, Serbia
F	22	Willie Wiley	6 ft 7 in (2.01 m)	215 lb (98 kg)	Jr	Vincennes	Springfield, IL
G	31	D. J. Balentine	6 ft 2 in (1.88 m)	210 lb (95 kg)	Jr	Kokomo	Kokomo, IN
F/C	44	David Howard	6 ft 8 in (2.03 m)	225 lb (102 kg)	RS So	Montgomery Bell	Nashville, TN
G/F	50	Blake Simmons	6 ft 5 in (1.96 m)	210 lb (95 kg)	So	Castle	Newburgh, IN
C	55	Egidijus Mockevičius	6 ft 10 in (2.08 m)	225 lb (102 kg)	Jr	Lithuanian Edu. Sciences	Kuršėnai, Lithuania

Head coach

- Marty Simmons (Evansville)

Assistant coach(es)

- Jimmy Elgas (Illinois State)
- Carson Harris (Manchester (IN))
- Geoff Alexander (Western Illinois)

Legend

- (C) Team captain
- (S) Suspended
- (I) Ineligible
- (W) Walk-on
- Injured
- Current redshirt

Roster

== Schedule ==
Date time, TV	Opponent	Result	Record	Site (attendance) city, state
Exhibition
11/01/2014*; 1:05 pm	McKendree	W 88–60		Ford Center (2,722); Evansville, IN
11/08/2014*; 3:05 pm	Wabash	W 95–50		Ford Center (3,936); Evansville, IN
Regular season
11/15/2014*; 2:05 pm	Earlham	W 116–45	1–0	Ford Center (4,238); Evansville, IN
11/19/2014*; 6:00 pm	at Miami (OH)	W 69–50	2–0	Millett Hall (826); Oxford, OH
11/24/2014*; 1:30 pm	vs. Fresno State; Gulf Coast Classic quarterfinals	W 58–52	3–0	Germain Arena (2,118); Estero, FL
11/25/2014*; 5:00 pm	vs. Green Bay; Gulf Coast Classic semifinals	L 62–64	3–1	Germain Arena (3,027); Estero, FL
11/26/2014*; 5:00 pm	vs. San Francisco; Gulf Coast Classic 3rd place game	W 79–72	4–1	Germain Arena (3,867); Estero, FL
12/02/2014*; 7:05 pm	Wright State	W 86–72	5–1	Ford Center (3,291); Evansville, IN
12/06/2014*; 7:05 pm	IUPUI	W 89–62	6–1	Ford Center (3,889); Evansville, IN
12/09/2014*; 7:00 pm	at Belmont	W 65–62	7–1	Curb Event Center (1,160); Nashville, TN
12/13/2014*; 1:05 pm	Murray State	L 79–81	7–2	Ford Center (5,083); Evansville, IN
12/18/2014*; 8:05 pm	Ohio	W 81–69	8–2	Ford Center (3,610); Evansville, IN
12/21/2014*; 1:05 pm	Alabama State	W 81–63	9–2	Ford Center (3,861); Evansville, IN
12/28/2014*; 1:05 pm	Coppin State	W 85–80	10–2	Ford Center (4,329); Evansville, IN
Missouri Valley Conference regular season
01/01/2015; 7:00 pm, ESPN3	No. 23 Northern Iowa	W 52–49	11–2 (1–0)	Ford Center (5,151); Evansville, IN
01/04/2015; 12:30 pm, ESPN3	at Indiana State	L 75–79	11–3 (1–1)	Hulman Center (3,948); Terre Haute, IN
01/07/2015; 7:00 pm, ESPN3	Loyola–Chicago	L 70–71	11–4 (1–2)	Ford Center (4,321); Evansville, IN
01/10/2015; 1:00 pm	at Bradley	W 66–56	12–4 (2–2)	Carver Arena (5,614); Peoria, IL
01/14/2015; 1:00 pm	at Missouri State	W 56–54	13–4 (3–2)	JQH Arena (5,097); Springfield, MO
01/17/2015; 1:00 pm	No. 13 Wichita State	L 41–61	13–5 (3–3)	Ford Center (7,015); Evansville, IN
01/21/2015; 7:00 pm	at Loyola–Chicago	W 65–56	14–5 (4–3)	Joseph J. Gentile Arena (1,278); Chicago, IL
01/24/2015; 3:00 pm, ESPN3	Southern Illinois	W 75–66	15–5 (5–3)	Ford Center (5,521); Evansville, IN
01/27/2015; 7:00 pm, ESPN3	Indiana State	W 89–78	16–5 (6–3)	Ford Center (4,054); Evansville, IN
01/31/2015; 2:00 pm	at Drake	L 65–70	16–6 (6–4)	Knapp Center (4,120); Des Moines, IA
02/03/2015; 7:00 pm, ESPN3	at Illinois State	L 51–77	16–7 (6–5)	Redbird Arena (4,352); Normal, IL
02/07/2015; 1:00 pm	Bradley	L 53–56	16–8 (6–6)	Ford Center (4,106); Evansville, IN
02/10/2015; 7:00 pm, ESPN3	Missouri State	W 73–66	17–8 (7–6)	Ford Center (3,502); Evansville, IN
02/14/2015; 3:00 pm	at Southern Illinois	W 72–64	18–8 (8–6)	SIU Arena (5,265); Carbondale, IL
02/17/2015; 7:00 pm	Drake	W 61–52	19–8 (9–6)	Ford Center (3,418); Evansville, IN
02/22/2015; 3:00 pm, ESPNU	at No. 13 Wichita State	L 43–62	19–9 (9–7)	Charles Koch Arena (10,506); Wichita, KS
02/25/2015; 8:00 pm	at Northern Iowa	L 57–68	19–10 (9–8)	McLeod Center (6,935); Cedar Falls, IA
02/28/2015; 1:00 pm	Illinois State	L 67–69 ^{OT}	19–11 (9–9)	Ford Center (5,491); Evansville, IN
Missouri Valley tournament
03/06/2015; 2:35 pm, MVC TV/ESPN3	vs. Illinois State; Quarterfinals	L 67–71	19–12	Scottrade Center (9,015); St. Louis, MO
CIT
03/18/2015*; 7:00 pm	IPFW; First round	W 82–77	20–12	Ford Center (1,826); Evansville, IN
03/23/2015*; 7:00 pm	at Eastern Illinois; Second round	W 83–68	21–12	Lantz Arena (2,404); Charleston, IL
03/26/2015*; 7:30 pm	at Louisiana–Lafayette; Quarterfinals	W 89–82	22–12	Blackham Coliseum (3,541); Lafayette, LA
03/31/2015*; 6:00 pm, CBSSN	Tennessee–Martin; Semifinals	W 79–66	23–12	Ford Center (3,008); Evansville, IN
04/02/2015*; 6:00 pm, CBSSN	Northern Arizona; Championship game	W 71–65	24–12	Ford Center (4,549); Evansville, IN
*Non-conference game. ^{#}Rankings from AP Poll. (#) Tournament seedings in parentheses. All times are in Central Time.
