= 2014–15 Wichita State Shockers men's basketball team =

American college basketball season

2014–15 Wichita State Shockers men's basketball

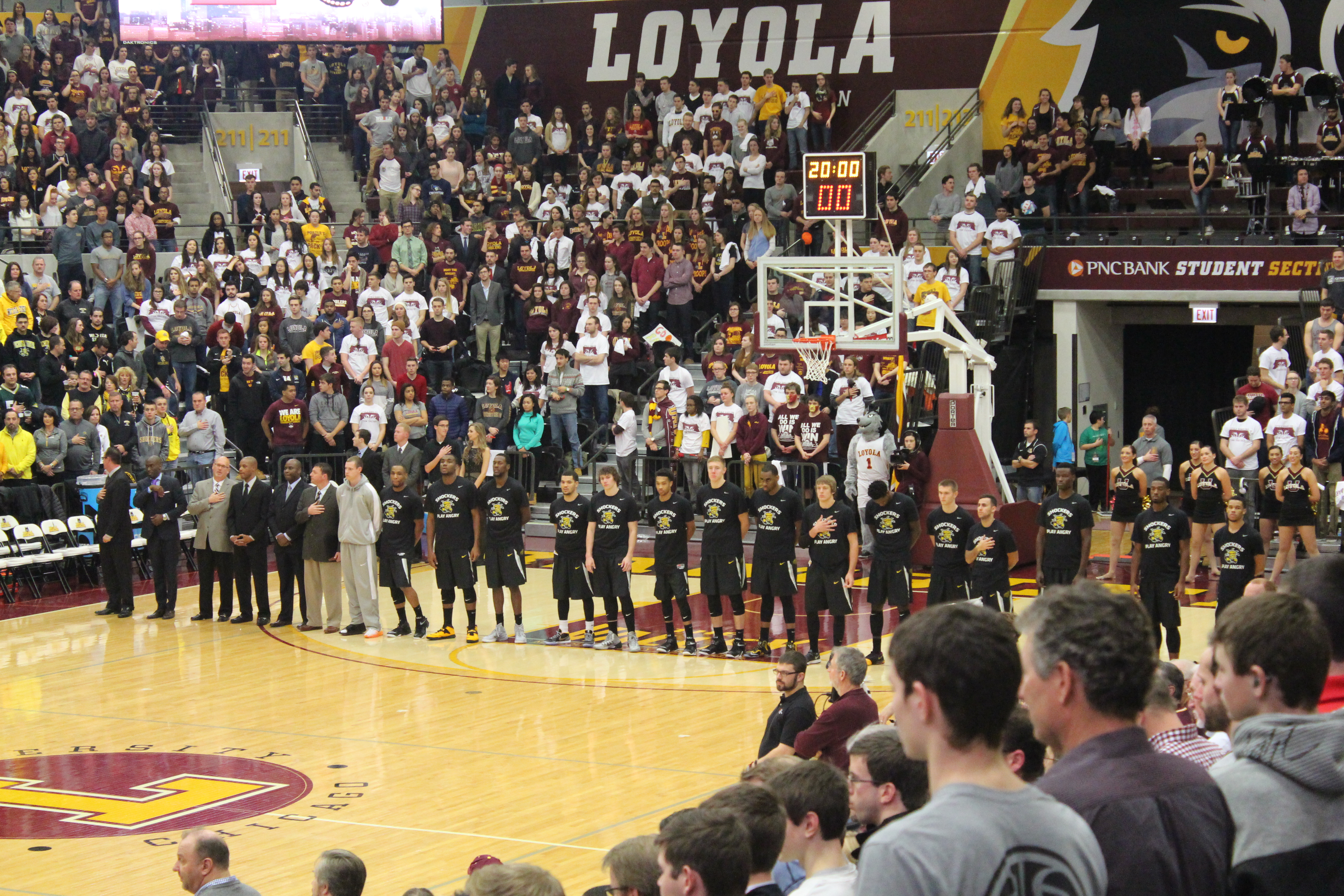

MVC regular season champions

NCAA tournament, Sweet Sixteen
- Conference: Missouri Valley Conference

Ranking
- Coaches: No. 11
- AP: No. 14
- Record: 30–5 (17–1 MVC)
- Head coach: Gregg Marshall
- Assistant coaches: Steve Forbes; Greg Heiar; Isaac Brown
- Home arena: Charles Koch Arena (10,506)

2014–15 Missouri Valley Conference men's basketball standings
	Conf.				Overall
Team	W		L	PCT	W		L	PCT
No. 14 Wichita State	17	–	1	.944	30	–	5	.857
No. 11 Northern Iowa †	16	–	2	.889	31	–	4	.886
Indiana State	11	–	7	.611	15	–	16	.484
Illinois State	11	–	7	.611	22	–	13	.629
Evansville	9	–	9	.500	24	–	12	.667
Loyola Chicago	8	–	10	.444	24	–	13	.649
Drake	6	–	12	.333	9	–	22	.290
Missouri State	5	–	13	.278	11	–	20	.355
Southern Illinois	4	–	14	.222	12	–	21	.364
Bradley	3	–	15	.167	9	–	24	.273
† 2015 MVC tournament winner Rankings from AP poll

The 2014–15 Wichita State Shockers men's basketball team represented Wichita State University in the 2014–15 NCAA Division I men's basketball season. They played their home games at Charles Koch Arena, which has a capacity of 10,506. They were playing their 70th season as a member of the Missouri Valley Conference, and were led by eighth-year head coach Gregg Marshall. They finished the season 30–5, 17–1 in MVC play to win the regular season Missouri Valley championship. They advanced to the semifinals of the Missouri Valley tournament where they lost to Illinois State. They received an at-large bid to the NCAA tournament where they defeated Indiana in the second round and Kansas in the third round before losing in the Sweet Sixteen to Notre Dame.

== Previous season ==
The 2013–14 season was arguably the greatest season in Wichita State's 108-year basketball history. After defeating Missouri State on March 1, 2014, Wichita State became the first Division I men's team ever to finish the regular season 31–0, the first team to finish 18–0 in conference play in the Missouri Valley Conference since the 1985–86 Bradley Braves, as well as the first to finish the regular season undefeated since Saint Joseph's in 2003–04. The team's 35–0 start is the best Division I start ever, beating the 1990–91 UNLV Runnin' Rebels who began the season 34–0 and the best Missouri Valley Conference start ever, beating the 1978–79 Indiana State Sycamores, who went 33–0 to start the season. They spent most of the season in the top 10 of both major polls, rising as high as #2 in late February. They continued their run by winning their first MVC tournament title since 1987, and were ranked second in both final major media polls—the highest final national ranking in school history.

They entered the 2014 NCAA Division I men's basketball tournament undefeated at 34–0. The Shockers beat Cal Poly, 64–37 for their NCAA-record 35–game winning streak to start a season. Two days later, and playing their 5th and final straight game at St. Louis' Scottrade Center, Fred VanVleet's three-point attempt at the end-of-game buzzer against Kentucky bounced harmlessly off the rim, and so went their attempt to become the first men's team in 38 years to win the title undefeated. The Shockers finished with the third-most wins in Division I history, and the second-most for a school not in a power conference.

== Departures ==
Name	Number	Pos.	Height	Weight	Year	Hometown	Reason
Chadrack Lufile	0	F	6'9"	251	Senior	Burlington, ON	Graduated
Derail Green	1	F	6'7"	199	RS Freshman	Houston, TX	Transferred to Incarnate Word
Cleanthony Early	11	F	6'8"	215	Senior	Middletown, NY	Graduated/2014 NBA draft
Nick Wiggins	15	G	6'6"	187	Senior	Toronto, ON	Graduated
Kadeem Coleby	20	C	6'9"	251	Senior	Nassau, BAH	Graduated
D. J. Bowles	25	G	6'1"	175	Freshman	Cleveland, TN	Retired from basketball due a surgical procedure

In addition to the departing players, assistant Chris Jans left the Shockers immediately after the season to take the head coaching vacancy at Bowling Green.

=== Incoming transfers ===
Name	Number	Pos.	Height	Weight	Year	Hometown	Previous School
Bush Wamukota†	21	C	7'0"	225	Junior	Bungoma, Kenya	Kilgore College
Conner Frankamp*	33	G	6'0"	165	Sophomore	Wichita, KS	Kansas
Tevin Glass†	40	F	6'8"	195	Junior	Norcross, GA	Northwest Florida State College

*Player will redshirt during the season
†Junior College transfer

== Class of 2014 recruits ==
College recruiting
Name	Hometown	School	Height	Weight	Commit date
Zach Brown; SF	Houston, TX	Sunrise Christian Academy	6 ft 7 in (2.01 m)	180 lb (82 kg)	May 3, 2013
Zach Brown; SF	Recruit ratings: Scout: Rivals: (75)				
Rashard Kelly; PF	Fredericksburg, VA	Hargrave Military Academy	6 ft 7 in (2.01 m)	210 lb (95 kg)	Oct 3, 2013
Rashard Kelly; PF	Recruit ratings: Scout: Rivals: (73)				
Rauno Nurger; PF	Keila, Estonia	Sunrise Christian Academy	6 ft 10 in (2.08 m)	230 lb (100 kg)	Jun 3, 2014
Rauno Nurger; PF	Recruit ratings: Scout: Rivals: (70)				
Corey Henderson Jr. SG	Dallas, TX	Episcopal School of Dallas	6 ft 5 in (1.96 m)	165 lb (75 kg)	Oct 13, 2013
Corey Henderson Jr. SG	Recruit ratings: Scout: Rivals: (NR)				
Eric Hamilton; PF	Suwanee, GA	Duluth High School	6 ft 8 in (2.03 m)	200 lb (91 kg)	Nov 20, 2013
Eric Hamilton; PF	Recruit ratings: Scout: Rivals: (NR)				
Overall recruit ranking: Scout: Not Ranked Top 20 Rivals: Not Ranked Top 25 ESPN: Not Ranked Top 25
Note: In many cases, Scout, Rivals, 247Sports, On3, and ESPN may conflict in their listings of height and weight.; In these cases, the average was taken. ESPN grades are on a 100-point scale.; Sources: "2014 Wichita State Basketball Commits". Rivals.; "2014 Wichita State Basketball Commits". Scout.; "2014 Wichita State Basketball Commits". ESPN.; "Scout.com Team Recruiting Rankings". Scout.; "2014 Team Ranking". Rivals.

== Roster ==
2014–15 Wichita State Shockers men's basketball team
Players
Coaches

Pos.	#	Name	Height	Weight	Year	Hometown
F	0	Rashard Kelly	6 ft 7 in (2.01 m)	235 lb (107 kg)	Fr	Fredericksburg, VA
F	1	Zach Brown	6 ft 6 in (1.98 m)	213 lb (97 kg)	Fr	Houston, TX
G	3	Evan Wessel	6 ft 4 in (1.93 m)	218 lb (99 kg)	RS Jr	Wichita, KS
G	4	Corey Henderson, Jr.	6 ft 2 in (1.88 m)	170 lb (77 kg)	Fr	Dallas, TX
F	5	Zach Bush	6 ft 6 in (1.98 m)	200 lb (91 kg)	RS Fr	Wichita, KS
G	10	Ri'an Holland	6 ft 0 in (1.83 m)	148 lb (67 kg)	RS Fr	Hope Mills, NC
F	12	Darius Carter	6 ft 7 in (2.01 m)	245 lb (111 kg)	Sr	Akron, OH
G	14	John Robert Simon	5 ft 10 in (1.78 m)	171 lb (78 kg)	So	Oklahoma City, OK
C	20	Rauno Nurger	6 ft 10 in (2.08 m)	242 lb (110 kg)	Fr	Keila, Estonia
C	21	Tom Wamukota	6 ft 11 in (2.11 m)	224 lb (102 kg)	Jr	Bungoma, Kenya
G	23	Fred VanVleet	6 ft 0 in (1.83 m)	195 lb (88 kg)	Jr	Rockford, IL
F	24	Shaquille Morris	6 ft 7 in (2.01 m)	261 lb (118 kg)	RS Fr	Edmond, OK
G	31	Ron Baker	6 ft 4 in (1.93 m)	220 lb (100 kg)	RS Jr	Scott City, KS
G	32	Tekele Cotton	6 ft 3 in (1.91 m)	205 lb (93 kg)	Sr	Marietta, GA
G	33	Conner Frankamp (redshirt)	6 ft 0 in (1.83 m)	165 lb (75 kg)	So	Wichita, KS
F	40	Tevin Glass	6 ft 8 in (2.03 m)	206 lb (93 kg)	Jr	Milton, GA

Head coach

- Gregg Marshall (Randolph–Macon)

Assistant coach(es)

- Steve Forbes (Southern Arkansas)
- Greg Heiar (Franciscan)
- Isaac Brown (Louisiana–Monroe)

Legend

- (C) Team captain
- (S) Suspended
- (I) Ineligible
- (W) Walk-on
- Injured
- Current redshirt

Roster

== Schedule ==
Date time, TV	Rank^{#}	Opponent^{#}	Result	Record	High points	High rebounds	High assists	Site (attendance) city, state
Exhibition
11/08/2014*; 2:00 pm, Cox Kansas	No. 11	Northwood (FL)	W 112–55		22 – Baker	6 – Kelly	6 – VanVleet	Charles Koch Arena (10,506); Wichita, KS
Non-conference regular season
11/14/2014*; 8:00 pm, Cox Kansas	No. 11	New Mexico State	W 71–54	1–0	17 – Cotton	5 – Tied	4 – VanVleet	Charles Koch Arena (10,506); Wichita, KS
11/18/2014*; 1:00 pm, ESPN	No. 11	vs. Memphis; ESPN College Hoops Tip-Off Marathon	W 71–56	2–0	21 – Baker	4 – Tied	6 – Baker	Sanford Pentagon (3,250); Sioux Falls, SD
11/23/2014*; 2:00 pm, Cox Kansas	No. 11	Newman	W 105–57	3–0	18 – Baker	6 – Tied	4 – VanVleet	Charles Koch Arena (10,506); Wichita, KS
11/29/2014*; 2:00 pm, Cox Kansas	No. 9	Tulsa; Rivalry	W 75–55	4–0	21 – VanVleet	7 – Cotton	9 – VanVleet	Charles Koch Arena (10,506); Wichita, KS
12/03/2014*; 10:00 pm, ESPN2	No. 8	at No. 25 Utah	L 68–69 ^{OT}	4–1	15 – Baker	9 – Wessel	4 – VanVleet	Jon M. Huntsman Center (14,319); Salt Lake City, UT
12/06/2014*; 5:00 pm, Cox Kansas	No. 8	Saint Louis	W 81–52	5–1	18 – Baker	7 – Kelly	7 – Cotton	Intrust Bank Arena (15,004); Wichita, KS
12/09/2014*; 6:00 pm, ESPN2	No. 11	Seton Hall	W 77–68	6–1	22 – Baker	12 – Carter	8 – VanVleet	Charles Koch Arena (10,506); Wichita, KS
12/13/2014*; 11:00 am, ESPNU	No. 11	at Detroit	W 77–68	7–1	19 – Baker	11 – Carter	7 – VanVleet	Calihan Hall (4,110); Detroit, MI
12/16/2014*; 8:00 pm, ESPN2	No. 11	Alabama	W 53–52	8–1	8 – Baker	5 – Carter	3 – Cotton	Charles Koch Arena (10,506); Wichita, KS
12/22/2014*; 10:00 pm, ESPNU	No. 11	vs. Loyola Marymount; Diamond Head Classic quarterfinals	W 80–53	9–1	12 – Tied	8 – Carter	7 – VanVleet	Stan Sheriff Center (8,448); Honolulu, HI
12/23/2014*; 8:00 pm, ESPN2	No. 11	vs. Hawaii; Diamond Head Classic semifinals	W 80–79 ^{OT}	10–1	17 – Baker	6 – Tied	5 – VanVleet	Stan Sheriff Center (7,140); Honolulu, HI
12/25/2014*; 8:30 pm, ESPN2	No. 11	vs. George Washington; Diamond Head Classic championship	L 54–60	10–2	11 – VanVleet	9 – Carter	5 – Tied	Stan Sheriff Center (5,125); Honolulu, HI
Missouri Valley Conference regular season
12/31/2014; 5:05 pm, Cox Kansas	No. 16	at Drake	W 66–58	11–2 (1–0)	23 – Baker	7 – Carter	4 – Tied	Knapp Center (4,170); Des Moines, IA
01/04/2015; 4:30 pm, ESPNU	No. 16	Illinois State	W 70–62	12–2 (2–0)	15 – Baker	6 – VanVleet	6 – VanVleet	Charles Koch Arena (10,506); Wichita, KS
01/07/2015; 7:00 pm, Cox Kansas	No. 15	Bradley	W 63–43	13–2 (3–0)	19 – Carter	7 – Tied	9 – VanVleet	Charles Koch Arena (10,506); Wichita, KS
01/11/2015; 4:00 pm, ESPNU	No. 15	at Loyola (IL)	W 67–53	14–2 (4–0)	16 – Cotton	8 – Carter	10 – VanVleet	Joseph J. Gentile Arena (4,058); Chicago, IL
01/14/2015; 7:00 pm, Cox Kansas	No. 13	Southern Illinois	W 67–55	15–2 (5–0)	25 – Carter	4 – Tied	5 – Tied	Charles Koch Arena (10,506); Wichita, KS
01/17/2015; 1:00 pm, FSKC	No. 13	at Evansville	W 61–41	16–2 (6–0)	18 – Tied	11 – Carter	4 – Cotton	Ford Center (7,015); Evansville, IN
01/21/2015; 7:05 pm, Cox Kansas	No. 14	at Missouri State; Rivalry	W 76–53	17–2 (7–0)	15 – Tied	6 – Cotton	7 – VanVleet	JQH Arena (8,674); Springfield, MO
01/25/2015; 3:00 pm, ESPN3	No. 14	Drake	W 74–40	18–2 (8–0)	15 – Baker	4 – Tied	6 – VanVleet	Charles Koch Arena (10,506); Wichita, KS
01/28/2015; 7:00 pm, Cox Kansas	No. 12	Loyola (IL)	W 58–47	19–2 (9–0)	27 – VanVleet	7 – Cotton	5 – Cotton	Charles Koch Arena (10,506); Wichita, KS
01/31/2015; 3:00 pm, ESPN2	No. 12	at No. 18 Northern Iowa	L 54–70	19–3 (9–1)	18 – VanVleet	8 – Cotton	3 – Tied	McLeod Center (7,050); Cedar Falls, IA
02/04/2015; 7:00 pm, Cox Kansas	No. 16	at Bradley	W 62–59	20–3 (10–1)	14 – Baker	7 – Cotton	5 – Baker	Peoria Civic Center (6,707); Peoria, IL
02/07/2015; 7:00 pm, ESPN2	No. 16	Missouri State; Rivalry	W 78–35	21–3 (11–1)	17 – Baker	10 – VanVleet	11 – VanVleet	Charles Koch Arena (10,506); Wichita, KS
02/11/2015; 7:00 pm, Cox Kansas	No. 15	Indiana State	W 74-57	22–3 (12–1)	21 – VanVleet	7 – Carter	4 – VanVleet	Charles Koch Arena (10,506); Wichita, KS
02/14/2015; 5:00 pm, ESPN2	No. 15	at Illinois State	W 68–62	23–3 (13–1)	19 – Baker	10 – Cotton	3 – VanVleet	Redbird Arena (9,345); Normal, IL
02/17/2015; 7:05 pm, Cox Kansas	No. 13	at Southern Illinois	W 84–62	24–3 (14–1)	17 – Morris	7 – Tied	5 – Cotton	SIU Arena (5,358); Carbondale, IL
02/22/2015; 3:00 pm, ESPNU	No. 13	Evansville	W 62–43	25–3 (15–1)	22 – VanVleet	15 – Baker	7 – Cotton	Charles Koch Arena (10,506); Wichita, KS
02/25/2015; 6:05 pm, Cox Kansas	No. 11	at Indiana State	W 63–53	26–3 (16–1)	20 – Carter	11 – Carter	5 – VanVleet	Hulman Center (6,169); Terre Haute, IN
02/28/2015; 1:00 pm, ESPN	No. 11	No. 10 Northern Iowa; ESPN College GameDay	W 74–60	27–3 (17–1)	17 – Baker	8 – Cotton	7 – Tied	Charles Koch Arena (10,506); Wichita, KS
Missouri Valley tournament
03/06/2015; 12:05 pm, MVC TV/ESPN3	(1) No. 8	vs. (9) Southern Illinois; Quarterfinals	W 56–45	28–3	13 – VanVleet	5 – Wessel	4 – VanVleet	Scottrade Center (9,015); St. Louis, MO
03/07/2015; 1:35 pm, MVC TV/ESPN3	(1) No. 8	vs. (4) Illinois State; Semifinals	L 62–65	28–4	19 – VanVleet	7 – VanVleet	7 – Baker	Scottrade Center (13,898); St. Louis, MO
NCAA men's basketball tournament
03/20/2015*; 1:45 pm, CBS	(7 MW) No. 14	vs. (10 MW) Indiana; Second round	W 81–76	29–4	27 – VanVleet	8 – Brown	4 – VanVleet	CenturyLink Center (16,907); Omaha, NE
03/22/2015*; 4:15 pm, CBS	(7 MW) No. 14	vs. (2 MW) No. 10 Kansas; Third round	W 78–65	30–4	19 – Cotton	9 – Wessel	6 – VanVleet	CenturyLink Center (17,563); Omaha, NE
03/26/2015*; 6:15 pm, CBS	(7 MW) No. 14	vs. (3 MW) No. 8 Notre Dame; Sweet Sixteen	L 70–81	30–5	25 – VanVleet	8 – Carter	3 – Tied	Quicken Loans Arena (19,465); Cleveland, OH
*Non-conference game. ^{#}Rankings from AP Poll. (#) Tournament seedings in parentheses. MW=Midwest region. All times are in Central Time.

== Rankings ==
Ranking movement Legend: ██ Improvement in ranking. ██ Decrease in ranking. RV=Others receiving votes.
Poll	Pre	Wk 2	Wk 3	Wk 4	Wk 5	Wk 6	Wk 7	Wk 8	Wk 9	Wk 10	Wk 11	Wk 12	Wk 13	Wk 14	Wk 15	Wk 16	Wk 17	Wk 18	Wk 19	Final
AP	11	11	9	8	11	11	11	16	15	13	14	12	16	15	13	11	8	12	14	n/a
Coaches	11	13	10	10	11	11	11	16	15	14	13	12	17	13	13	11	8	12	13	11

== See also ==
- 2014–15 Wichita State Shockers women's basketball team
