= 2015 Missouri Valley Conference men's basketball tournament =

- Classification: Division I
- Season: 2014–15
- Teams: 10
- Site: Scottrade Center; St. Louis, Missouri
- Champions: Northern Iowa (4th title)
- Winning coach: Ben Jacobson (3rd title)
- MVP: Seth Tuttle (Northern Iowa)
- Television: MVC TV, CBS

2014–15 Missouri Valley Conference men's basketball standings
	Conf.				Overall
Team	W		L	PCT	W		L	PCT
No. 14 Wichita State	17	–	1	.944	30	–	5	.857
No. 11 Northern Iowa †	16	–	2	.889	31	–	4	.886
Indiana State	11	–	7	.611	15	–	16	.484
Illinois State	11	–	7	.611	22	–	13	.629
Evansville	9	–	9	.500	24	–	12	.667
Loyola Chicago	8	–	10	.444	24	–	13	.649
Drake	6	–	12	.333	9	–	22	.290
Missouri State	5	–	13	.278	11	–	20	.355
Southern Illinois	4	–	14	.222	12	–	21	.364
Bradley	3	–	15	.167	9	–	24	.273
† 2015 MVC tournament winner Rankings from AP poll

The 2015 Missouri Valley Conference men's basketball tournament, popularly referred to as "Arch Madness", was an event held March 5–8, at the Scottrade Center in St. Louis. It was part of the 2014–15 NCAA Division I men's basketball season.

== Seeds ==
Teams were seeded by conference record, with a ties broken by record between the tied teams followed by non-conference strength of schedule, if necessary. The top six seeds received first round byes.

Seed	School	Conference	Overall	Tiebreaker
1	Wichita State	17–1	27–3	
2	Northern Iowa	16–2	27–3	
3	Indiana State	11–7	15–15	2–0 vs. Illinois State
4	Illinois State	11–7	19–11	0–2 vs. Indiana State
5	Evansville	9–9	19–11	
6	Loyola	8–10	18–12	
7	Drake	6–12	9–21	
8	Missouri State	5–13	11–19	
9	Southern Illinois	4–14	11–20	
10	Bradley	3–15	8–23	

== Schedule ==
Game	Time*	Matchup^{#}	Television
Opening Round – Thursday, March 5
1	6:05 pm	#9 Southern Illinois 55, #8 Missouri State 48	MVC TV
2	8:35 pm	#10 Bradley 52, #7 Drake 50^{OT}	MVC TV
Quarterfinals – Friday, March 6
3	12:05 pm	#1 Wichita State 56, #9 Southern Illinois 45	MVC TV
4	2:35 pm	#4 Illinois State 71, #5 Evansville 67	MVC TV
5	6:05 pm	#2 Northern Iowa 71, #10 Bradley 46	MVC TV
6	8:35 pm	#6 Loyola-Chicago 81, #3 Indiana State 53	MVC TV
Semifinals – Saturday, March 7
7	1:35 pm	#4 Illinois State 65, #1 Wichita State 62	MVC TV
8	4:05 pm	#2 Northern Iowa 63, #6 Loyola-Chicago 49	MVC TV
Final – Sunday, March 8
10	1:05 pm	#2 Northern Iowa 69, #4 Illinois State 60	CBS
*Game times in CT. #-Rankings denote tournament seeding.

== Tournament bracket ==
Opening Round; Thursday, March 5 MVC TV
8	Missouri State	48
9	Southern Illinois	55
7	Drake	50 ^{OT}
10	Bradley	52

Quarterfinals; Friday, March 6 MVC TV
1	No. 8 Wichita State	56
9	Southern Illinois	45
4	Illinois State	71
5	Evansville	67
2	No. 11 Northern Iowa	71
10	Bradley	46
3	Indiana State	53
6	Loyola-Chicago	81

Semifinals; Saturday, March 7 MVC TV
1	No. 8 Wichita State	62
4	Illinois State	65
2	No. 11 Northern Iowa	63
6	Loyola-Chicago	49

Final; Sunday, March 8 CBS
4	Illinois State	60
2	No. 11 Northern Iowa	69

=== Postseason History Multiple Bids ===
NCAA tournament
MVC NCAA Tournament Teams
2015	(7) Wichita St	(5) Northern Iowa
