= 2014–15 Bradley Braves men's basketball team =

American college basketball season

2014–15 Bradley Braves men's basketball
- Conference: Missouri Valley Conference
- Record: 9–24 (3–15 The Valley)
- Head coach: Geno Ford (4th season)
- Assistant coaches: Ronald Coleman; Jaden Uken; Cole Pitts
- Home arena: Carver Arena; Renaissance Coliseum

2014–15 Missouri Valley Conference men's basketball standings
	Conf.				Overall
Team	W		L	PCT	W		L	PCT
No. 14 Wichita State	17	–	1	.944	30	–	5	.857
No. 11 Northern Iowa †	16	–	2	.889	31	–	4	.886
Indiana State	11	–	7	.611	15	–	16	.484
Illinois State	11	–	7	.611	22	–	13	.629
Evansville	9	–	9	.500	24	–	12	.667
Loyola Chicago	8	–	10	.444	24	–	13	.649
Drake	6	–	12	.333	9	–	22	.290
Missouri State	5	–	13	.278	11	–	20	.355
Southern Illinois	4	–	14	.222	12	–	21	.364
Bradley	3	–	15	.167	9	–	24	.273
† 2015 MVC tournament winner Rankings from AP poll

The 2014–15 Bradley Braves men's basketball team represented Bradley University during the 2014–15 NCAA Division I men's basketball season. The Braves were led by fourth year head coach Geno Ford, and played their home games at Carver Arena, with one home game at Renaissance Coliseum in Peoria, Illinois. They were members of the Missouri Valley Conference. They finished the season 9–24, 3–15 in MVC play to finish in last place. They advanced to the quarterfinals of the Missouri Valley tournament where they lost to Northern Iowa.

On March 22, head coach Geno Ford was fired. He finished with a four-year record of 46–86.

== Roster ==
Number	Name	Position	Height	Weight	Year	Hometown
0	Ka'Darryl Bell	Guard	6–1	195	Junior	Chicago, Illinois
1	Donte Thomas	Forward	6-6	205	Freshman	Calumet City, Illinois
2	Warren Jones	Guard	6–3	190	Junior	Centralia, Illinois
3	Anthony Fields	Guard	6–0	160	Junior	Detroit, Michigan
4	Auston Barnes	Forward	6–8	215	Senior	Lansing, Michigan
5	Tramique Sutherland	Guard	5–11	175	Junior	Toronto, Ontario
12	Darrion Harris	Guard	5–10	155	Junior	St. Louis, Missouri
13	Kendahl Amerson	Guard	6–3	180	Junior	Detroit, Michigan
21	Josh Cunningham	Forward	6–7	180	Freshman	Chicago, Illinois
22	Xzavier Taylor	Forward/Center	6–9	225	Sophomore	Chicago, Illinois
24	Omari Grier	Guard	6–4	180	Junior	Erial, New Jersey
32	Mike Shaw	Forward	6–8	230	Junior	Chicago, Illinois
52	Nate Wells	Center	7–1	260	Junior	Davenport, Iowa

== Schedule ==
Date time, TV	Opponent	Result	Record	Site (attendance) city, state
Exhibition
10/29/2014*; 7:00 pm	Augustana	L 56–58		Carver Arena (5,406); Peoria, IL
Non-conference regular season
11/14/2014*; 7:00 pm	UT Arlington	L 75–86	0–1	Carver Arena (5,469); Peoria, IL
11/19/2014*; 8:00 pm	Robert Morris	L 61–68	0–2	Carver Arena (5,086); Peoria, IL
11/23/2014*; 4:00 pm	North Carolina A&T; Corpus Christi Coastal Classic	W 58–50	1–2	Carver Arena (6,039); Peoria, IL
11/25/2014*; 7:00 pm	Texas A&M–Corpus Christi; Corpus Christi Coastal Classic	W 52–38	2–2	Carver Arena (5,507); Peoria, IL
11/28/2014*; 6:00 pm, CBSSN	vs. TCU; Corpus Christi Coastal Classic	W 57–49	2–3	American Bank Center (N/A); Corpus Christi, TX
11/29/2014*; 3:00 pm	vs. Saint Louis; Corpus Christi Coastal Classic	L 57–60	2–4	American Bank Center (2,867); Corpus Christi, TX
12/02/2014*; 7:00 pm	Central Michigan	W 84–73	3–4	Renaissance Coliseum (4,204); Peoria, IL
12/06/2014*; 8:30 pm, ESPNU	at Memphis	L 45–73	3–5	FedExForum (13,807); Memphis, TN
12/09/2014*; 7:00 pm, ESPN3	at Kansas State	L 47–50	3–6	Bramlage Coliseum (12,238); Manhattan, KS
12/18/2014*; 7:00 pm	Eureka	W 80–38	4–6	Carver Arena (5,325); Peoria, IL
12/21/2014*; 1:30 pm	vs. UC Irvine; South Point Holiday Hoops Classic	L 47–55	4–7	South Point Arena (N/A); Enterprise, NV
12/22/2014*; 1:00 pm	vs. Arkansas–Little Rock; South Point Holiday Hoops Classic	L 54–64	4–8	South Point Arena (N/A); Enterprise, NV
12/28/2014*; 4:00 pm, ESPN3	UIC	W 68–60	5–8	Carver Arena (5,343); Peoria, IL
Missouri Valley Conference regular season
12/31/2014; 1:00 pm	at Loyola–Chicago	L 49–64	5–9 (0–1)	Joseph J. Gentile Arena (ESPN3); Chicago, IL
01/03/2015; 7:00 pm, CSN Chicago	Southern Illinois	W 63–44	6–9 (1–1)	Carver Arena (6,035); Peoria, IL
01/07/2015; 7:00 pm, ESPN3	at No. 15 Wichita State	L 43–63	6–10 (1–2)	Charles Koch Arena (10,506); Wichita, KS
01/10/2015; 1:00 pm	Evansville	L 56–66	6–11 (1–3)	Carver Arena (5,614); Peoria, IL
01/13/2015; 7:00 pm	No. 23 Northern Iowa	L 52–63	6–12 (1–4)	Carver Arena (5,129); Peoria, IL
01/17/2015; 4:00 pm, CSN Chicago	at Illinois State; I-74 Rivalry	L 72–82	6–13 (1–5)	Redbird Arena (9,627); Normal, IL
01/21/2015; 7:00 pm, ESPN3	at Southern Illinois	L 59–70	6–14 (1–6)	SIU Arena (4,792); Carbondale, IL
01/24/2015; 7:00 pm, ESPN3	Missouri State	W 61–59	7–14 (2–6)	Carver Arena (6,059); Peoria, IL
01/28/2015; 7:00 pm, MVCTV	Drake	L 57–69	7–15 (2–7)	Carver Arena (5,431); Peoria, IL
01/31/2015; 12:00 pm	at Indiana State	L 58–64	7–16 (2–8)	Hulman Center (4,389); Terre Haute, IN
02/04/2015; 7:00 pm, ESPN3	No. 16 Wichita State	L 59–62	7–17 (2–9)	Carver Arena (6,707); Peoria, IL
02/07/2015; 1:00 pm	at Evansville	W 56–53	8–17 (3–9)	Ford Center (4,106); Evansville, IN
02/11/2015; 7:00 pm	at Drake	L 54–60	8–18 (3–10)	Knapp Center (3,146); Des Moines, IA
02/15/2015; 1:00 pm, ESPN3	Loyola–Chicago	L 53–58	8–19 (3–11)	Carver Arena (5,825); Peoria, IL
02/18/2015; 8:00 pm, MVCTV	Illinois State; I-74 Rivalry	L 47–60	8–20 (3–12)	Carver Arena (7,349); Peoria, IL
02/21/2015; 3:00 pm, MVCTV	at No. 11 Northern Iowa	L 39–56	8–21 (3–13)	McLeod Center (6,650); Cedar Falls, IA
02/25/2015; 7:00 pm	at Missouri State	L 77–80 ^{3OT}	8–22 (3–14)	JQH Arena (4,454); Springfield, MO
02/28/2015; 1:00 pm	Indiana State	L 52–60	8–23 (3–15)	Carver Arena (6,492); Peoria, IL
Missouri Valley tournament
03/05/2015; 8:35 pm, MVC TV	vs. Drake first round	W 52–50 ^{OT}	9–23	Scottrade Center (5,608); St. Louis, MO
03/06/2015; 6:05 pm, MVC TV	vs. No. 11 Northern Iowa quarterfinals	L 46–71	9–24	Scottrade Center (N/A); St. Louis, MO
*Non-conference game. ^{#}Rankings from AP Poll. (#) Tournament seedings in parentheses. All times are in Central Time.
