= Corpus Christi Coastal Classic =

American college basketball tournament

- Sport: College basketball
- Founded: 2013
- No. of teams: 8
- Country: United States
- Venue: American Bank Center
- Most recent champion: UTEP
- Most titles: UTEP (1), TCU (1), Virginia (1)
- Broadcaster: American Sports Network

The Corpus Christi Coastal Classic is a college basketball tournament that started in 2013 played at the American Bank Center played in Corpus Christi, Texas. Each team will play four games, the first two on campus sites and the final two rounds in Corpus Christi. The Semifinals and Finals of Hosts' bracket are televised on CBS Sports Network.

== 2013 ==
Semifinals; November 29; CBS Sports Network
Virginia | 76
SMU | 73
Missouri State | 67
Texas A&M | 63

Championship; November 30; CBS Sports Network
Virginia | 83
Missouri State | 63
Consolation; November 30; CBS Sports Network
SMU | 55
Texas A&M | 52

Semifinals; November 29
Arkansas–Pine Bluff | 49
Sam Houston State | 75
Hampton | 53
Liberty | 70

Championship; November 30
Sam Houston State | 83
Liberty | 63
Consolation; November 30
Arkansas–Pine Bluff | 62
Hampton | 75

== 2014 ==
Semifinals; November 28; CBS Sports Network
Bradley | 49
TCU | 57
Mississippi State | 75
Saint Louis | 50

Championship; November 29; CBS Sports Network
TCU | 61
Mississippi State | 52
Consolation; November 29; CBS Sports Network
Bradley | 57
Saint Louis | 60

Semifinals; November 28
Texas A&M–Corpus Christi | 75
Mississippi Valley State | 66
North Carolina A&T | 57
Radford | 65

Championship; November 29
Texas A&M–Corpus Christi | 46
Radford | 57
Consolation; November 29
Mississippi Valley State | 66
North Carolina A&T | 63

== 2015 Bracket ==
Semifinals; November 27; ASN
Southern Illinois | 66
UTEP | 71
Portland | 74
Colorado State | 90

Championship; November 28; ASN
UTEP | 99
Colorado State | 90^{2OT}
Consolation; November 28
Southern Illinois | 80
Portland | 79

Semifinals; November 27
Abilene Christian | 72
Florida A&M | 62
Alcorn State | 51
Oakland | 84

Championship; November 28
Abilene Christian | 57
Oakland | 85
Consolation; November 28
Florida A&M | 73
Alcorn State | 71
