= 2014–15 Atlantic 10 Conference men's basketball season =

- League: NCAA Division I
- Sport: Basketball
- Teams: 14
- TV partner(s): CBSSN, NBCSN, CBS

Tournament

Atlantic 10 men's basketball seasons
- ← 13–14 15–16 →

2014–15 Atlantic 10 men's basketball standings
	Conf.				Overall
Team	W		L	PCT	W		L	PCT
Davidson	14	–	4	.778	24	–	8	.750
Dayton	13	–	5	.722	27	–	9	.750
Rhode Island	13	–	5	.722	23	–	10	.697
VCU †	12	–	6	.667	26	–	10	.722
Richmond	12	–	6	.667	21	–	14	.600
George Washington	10	–	8	.556	22	–	13	.629
St. Bonaventure	10	–	8	.556	18	–	13	.581
UMass	10	–	8	.556	17	–	15	.531
La Salle	8	–	10	.444	17	–	16	.515
Saint Joseph's	7	–	11	.389	13	–	18	.419
Duquesne	6	–	12	.333	12	–	19	.387
Fordham	4	–	14	.222	10	–	21	.323
George Mason	4	–	14	.222	9	–	22	.290
Saint Louis	3	–	15	.167	11	–	21	.344
† 2015 A10 tournament winner Rankings from AP poll

The 2014–15 Atlantic 10 Conference men's basketball season was the 39th season of Atlantic 10 Conference basketball. The season marked the first for new member, Davidson. The 2015 Atlantic 10 men's basketball tournament was held at the Barclays Center in Brooklyn, New York.

The defending regular season champion was Saint Louis and the defending tournament champion was Saint Joseph's.

Davidson won the regular season championship. VCU was the A-10 tournament champion. VCU earned the conference's automatic bid to the NCAA tournament.

== Conference Awards ==
Award	Recipients
Coach of the Year	Bob McKillop (Davidson)
Player of the Year	Tyler Kalinoski (Davidson)
Defensive Player of the Year	Brianté Weber (VCU)
Rookie of the Year	Eric Paschall (Fordham)
Sixth Man of the Year	ShawnDre' Jones (Richmond)
Chris Daniels Most Improved Player of the Year	Kendall Pollard (Dayton)
All-Academic Team	Jon Severe (Fordham); Mike Crawford (St. Louis); John Kopriva (George Washington); Mo Alie-Cox (VCU); Gilvydas Biruta (Rhode Island)
First Team	Tyler Kalinoski (Davidson); Jordan Sibert (Dayton); Kendall Anthony (Richmond); DeAndre' Bembry (St. Joseph's); Treveon Graham (VCU)
Second Team	Jack Gibbs (Davidson); Brian Sullivan (Davidson); Dyshawn Pierre (Dayton); Jordan Price (La Salle); Hassan Martin (Rhode Island); E. C. Matthews (Rhode Island)
Third Team	Shevon Thompson (George Mason); Kevin Larsen (George Washington); Cady Lalanne (UMass); Youssou Ndoye (St. Bonaventure); Marcus Posley (St. Bonaventure)
Honorable Mention	
All-Defensive Team	Patricio Garino (George Washington); Hassan Martin (Rhode Island); Youssou Ndoye (St. Bonaventure); Mo Alie-Cox (VCU); Brianté Weber (VCU)
All-Rookie Team	Peyton Aldridge (Davidson); Eric Paschall (Fordham); Christian Sengfelder (Fordham); Jared Terrell (Rhode Island); Milik Yarbrough (St. Louis)
