= 2014–15 St. Bonaventure Bonnies men's basketball team =

American college basketball season

2014–15 St. Bonaventure Bonnies men's basketball
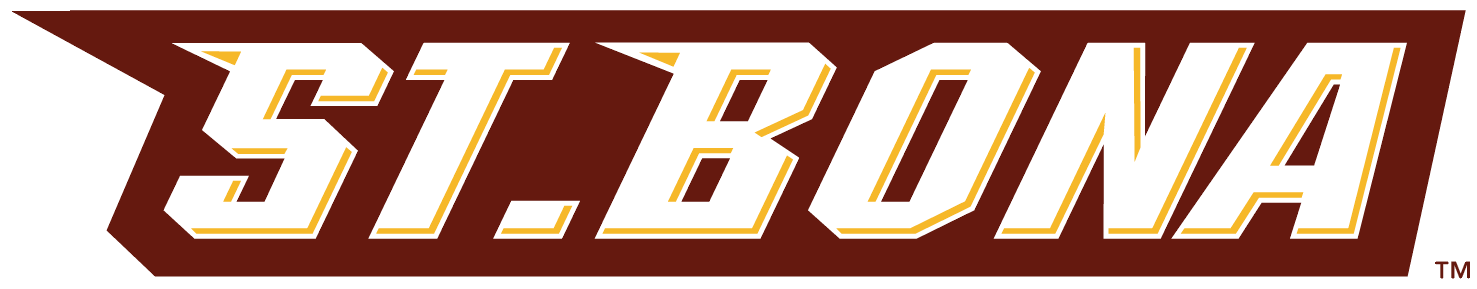
- Conference: Atlantic 10 Conference
- Record: 18–13 (10–8 A-10)
- Head coach: Mark Schmidt (8th season)
- Assistant coaches: Dave Moore; Steve Curran; Jerome Robinson
- Home arena: Reilly Center

2014–15 Atlantic 10 men's basketball standings
	Conf.				Overall
Team	W		L	PCT	W		L	PCT
Davidson	14	–	4	.778	24	–	8	.750
Dayton	13	–	5	.722	27	–	9	.750
Rhode Island	13	–	5	.722	23	–	10	.697
VCU †	12	–	6	.667	26	–	10	.722
Richmond	12	–	6	.667	21	–	14	.600
George Washington	10	–	8	.556	22	–	13	.629
St. Bonaventure	10	–	8	.556	18	–	13	.581
UMass	10	–	8	.556	17	–	15	.531
La Salle	8	–	10	.444	17	–	16	.515
Saint Joseph's	7	–	11	.389	13	–	18	.419
Duquesne	6	–	12	.333	12	–	19	.387
Fordham	4	–	14	.222	10	–	21	.323
George Mason	4	–	14	.222	9	–	22	.290
Saint Louis	3	–	15	.167	11	–	21	.344
† 2015 A10 tournament winner Rankings from AP poll

The 2014–15 St. Bonaventure Bonnies men's basketball team represented St. Bonaventure University during the 2014–15 NCAA Division I men's basketball season. The Bonnies, led by eighth year head coach Mark Schmidt, played their home games at the Reilly Center and were members of the Atlantic 10 Conference. They finished the season 18–13, 10–8 in A-10 play to finish in a three way tie for sixth place. They advanced to the quarterfinals of the A-10 Tournament where they lost to Dayton. For the second consecutive year, the Bonnies accumulated a winning record but did not receive an invite the postseason; the team failed to qualify for the National Invitation Tournament and, in accordance with school policy, preemptively ruled out participating in either the College Basketball Invitational or CollegeInsider.com Postseason Tournament.

== Previous season ==
The Bonnies finished the season with an overall record of 18–15, with a record of 6–10 in the Atlantic 10 regular season for a ninth-place finish. In the 2014 Atlantic 10 tournament, the Bonnies were defeated by Saint Joseph's the semifinals. Despite an overall winning record that included an upset over top-ranked Saint Louis in the A-10 tournament quarterfinals, the Bonnies were not invited to a postseason bid due to an inability to come to an agreement with the College Basketball Invitational.

== Off season ==
=== Departures ===
Name	Number	Pos.	Height	Weight	Year	Hometown	Notes
Charlon Kloof	3	G	6'3"	195	Senior	Paramaribo, Suriname	Graduated
Danny Farrell	10	G	6'0"	170	Senior	Binghamton, NY	Graduated
Matthias Runs	20	C	7'0"	240	Sophomore	Hilversum, Netherlands	Transferred to Georgia Southwestern State
Matthew Wright	24	G	6'4"	200	Senior	Toronto, ON	Graduated
Marquise Simmons	33	F/C	6'8"	235	RS Senior	Capitol Heights, MD	Graduated
Jean Yves Toupane	43	G/F	6'7"	185	Sophomore	Dakar, Senegal	Transferred to Gannon

=== Incoming transfers ===
Name	Number	Pos.	Height	Weight	Year	Hometown	Previous School
Iakeem Alston	0	G	6'0"	170	Junior	Baltimore, MD	Junior college transfer from Sheridan College
Marcus Posley	3	G/F	6'0"	200	Junior	Rockford, IL	Junior college transfer from Indian Hills Community College

== Incoming recruits ==
College recruiting information
Name	Hometown	School	Height	Weight	Commit date
Idris Taqqee; SF	Ashburnham, MA	Cushing Academy	6 ft 5 in (1.96 m)	180 lb (82 kg)	Aug 25, 2013
Idris Taqqee; SF	Recruit ratings: Scout: Rivals: (N/A)				
Jaylen Adams; PG	Hanover, MD	Mount St. Joseph High School	5 ft 11 in (1.80 m)	150 lb (68 kg)	Apr 16, 2014
Jaylen Adams; PG	Recruit ratings: Scout: Rivals: (N/A)				
Jordan Tyson; C	Cincinnati, OH	Fishburne Military School	6 ft 10 in (2.08 m)	250 lb (110 kg)	Sep 25, 2013
Jordan Tyson; C	Recruit ratings: Scout: Rivals: (POST)				
Overall recruit ranking:
Note: In many cases, Scout, Rivals, 247Sports, On3, and ESPN may conflict in their listings of height and weight.; In these cases, the average was taken. ESPN grades are on a 100-point scale.; Sources: "2014 Team Ranking". Rivals.

== Roster ==
2014–15 St. Bonaventure Bonnies men's basketball team
Players
Coaches

Pos.	#	Name	Height	Weight	Year	Hometown
G	0	Iakeem Alston	6 ft 2 in (1.88 m)	180 lb (82 kg)	Jr	Baltimore, MD
G	1	Idris Taqqee	6 ft 4 in (1.93 m)	195 lb (88 kg)	Fr	Ashburnham, MA
G	2	Opeyemi Olomo (W)	5 ft 11 in (1.8 m)	175 lb (79 kg)	Sr	Brooklyn, NY
G	3	Marcus Posley	6 ft 1 in (1.85 m)	185 lb (84 kg)	Jr	Rockford, IL
G	4	Jalen Adams	6 ft 5 in (1.96 m)	185 lb (84 kg)	RS Fr	Saginaw, MI
G	5	Jordan Gathers	6 ft 3 in (1.91 m)	200 lb (91 kg)	Sr	Los Angeles, CA
G	10	Jaylen Adams	6 ft 0 in (1.83 m)	175 lb (79 kg)	Fr	Hanover, MD
F	11	Xavier Smith	6 ft 8 in (2.03 m)	205 lb (93 kg)	So	Plano, TX
G/F	12	Denzel Gregg	6 ft 7 in (2.01 m)	210 lb (95 kg)	So	Syracuse, NY
F/C	15	Chris Dees	6 ft 8 in (2.03 m)	260 lb (118 kg)	Sr	Sylmar, CA
F	21	Dion Wright	6 ft 7 in (2.01 m)	220 lb (100 kg)	Jr	Lakewood, CA
G	23	Andell Cumberbatch	6 ft 5 in (1.96 m)	195 lb (88 kg)	Sr	East Orange, NJ
G	24	Quentin Weinerman	5 ft 8 in (1.73 m)	160 lb (73 kg)	So	Westlake Village, CA
C	35	Youssou Ndoye	7 ft 0 in (2.13 m)	245 lb (111 kg)	Sr	Dakar, Senegal
F	45	Jordan Tyson	6 ft 10 in (2.08 m)	210 lb (95 kg)	Fr	Cincinnati, OH

Head coach

- Mark Schmidt (Boston College)

Assistant coach(es)

- Dave Moore (Bethel (TN))
- Steve Curran (Merrimack)
- Jerome Robinson (Bradley)

Legend

- (C) Team captain
- (S) Suspended
- (I) Ineligible
- (W) Walk-on
- Injured
- Current redshirt

Roster

== Schedule ==
Date time, TV	Rank^{#}	Opponent^{#}	Result	Record	Site (attendance) city, state
Exhibition
11/08/2014*; 4:00 pm		Mansfield	W 86–45		Reilly Center (3,420); Olean, NY
Non-conference regular season
11/15/2014*; 7:00 pm		Dartmouth	W 77–57	1–0	Reilly Center (3,837); Olean, NY
11/19/2014*; 7:00 pm		Siena; Franciscan Cup	L 70–73	1–1	Reilly Center (3,291); Olean, NY
11/22/2014*; 4:00 pm		Canisius	W 59–53	2–1	Reilly Center (4,489); Olean, NY
11/25/2014*; 7:00 pm		Jackson State	W 79–71	3–1	Reilly Center (2,951); Olean, NY
11/29/2014*; 2:00 pm		vs. Niagara; Big 4 Classic	W 74–59	4–1	First Niagara Center (7,191); Buffalo, NY
12/03/2014*; 7:00 pm, TWCSC		Buffalo	W 72–63	5–1	Reilly Center (3,469); Olean, NY
12/06/2014*; 7:00 pm		at Ohio	W 80–70	6–1	Convocation Center (7,203); Athens, OH
12/13/2014*; 2:00 pm, ESPNU		at Pittsburgh	L 54–58	6–2	Peterson Events Center (9,425); Pittsburgh, PA
12/20/2014*; 2:00 pm		at Binghamton	W 69–51	7–2	Binghamton University Events Center (3,213); Vestal, NY
12/22/2014*; 7:00 pm		Maryland Eastern Shore	L 80–82	7–3	Reilly Center (3,293); Olean, NY
12/30/2014*; 7:00 pm		at Delaware	L 77–82	7–4	Bob Carpenter Center (2,050); Newark, DE
Atlantic 10 regular season
01/03/2015; 4:00 pm, ASN		at Massachusetts	W 69–55	8–4 (1–0)	Mullins Center (4,506); Amherst, MA
01/08/2015; 7:00 pm, CBSSN		Dayton	L 61–78	8–5 (1–1)	Reilly Center (3,495); Olean, NY
01/11/2015; 3:00 pm		at Richmond	L 41–60	8–6 (1–2)	Robins Center (5,629); Richmond, VA
01/14/2015; 7:00 pm		vs. George Mason; Conference Classic	W 75–55	9–6 (2–2)	Blue Cross Arena (4,032); Rochester, NY
01/18/2015; 2:30 pm, NBCSN		Saint Joseph's	W 70–61	10–6 (3–2)	Reilly Center (4,244); Olean, NY
01/22/2015; 7:00 pm		at Duquesne	W 100–97	11–6 (4–2)	Palumbo Center (2,257); Pittsburgh, PA
01/25/2015; 2:00 pm		at Rhode Island	L 48–53	11–7 (4–3)	Ryan Center (5,312); Kingston, RI
01/31/2015; 7:00 pm, TWCSC		La Salle	L 56–66	11–8 (4–4)	Reilly Center (4,769); Olean, NY
02/04/2015; 7:00 pm		at Davidson	W 62–61	12–8 (5–4)	John M. Belk Arena (4,264); Davidson, NC
02/07/2015; 2:00 pm, NBCSN		No. 18 VCU	W 73–71	13–8 (6–4)	Reilly Center (5,135); Olean, NY
02/11/2015; 7:00 pm, TWCSC		Massachusetts	L 53–55	13–9 (6–5)	Reilly Center (3,786); Olean, NY
02/14/2015; 12:30 pm, NBCSN		at Dayton	L 61–75	13–10 (6–6)	UD Arena (13,455); Dayton, OH
02/18/2015; 7:00 pm, TWCSC		Richmond	L 56–71	13–11 (6–7)	Reilly Center (3,319); Olean, NY
02/21/2015; 7:00 pm, SNY		at Saint Joseph's	W 70–60 ^{OT}	14–11 (7–7)	Hagan Arena (2,482); Philadelphia, PA
02/25/2015; 7:00 pm, ASN		at George Washington	L 46–69	14–12 (7–8)	Charles E. Smith Center (2,560); Washington, D.C.
02/28/2015; 4:00 pm		Duquesne	W 92–75	15–12 (8–8)	Reilly Center (4,671); Olean, NY
03/04/2015; 8:00 pm		at Saint Louis	W 64–48	16–12 (9–8)	Chaifetz Arena (6,017); St. Louis, MO
03/07/2015; 4:00 pm, TWCSC		Fordham	W 66–52	17–12 (10–8)	Reilly Center (3,555); Olean, NY
Atlantic 10 tournament
03/12/2015; 6:30 pm, NBCSN		vs. Saint Joseph's; Second Round	W 60-49	18–12	Barclays Center; Brooklyn, NY
03/13/2015; 6:30 pm, NBCSN		vs. Dayton; Quarterfinals	L 71-75	18–13	Barclays Center; Brooklyn, NY
*Non-conference game. ^{#}Rankings from AP Poll/Coaches' Poll. (#) Tournament seedings in parentheses. All times are in Eastern Time.

== See also ==
- 2014–15 St. Bonaventure Bonnies women's basketball team
