= 2015 Atlantic 10 men's basketball tournament =

- Classification: Division I
- Season: 2014–15
- Teams: 14
- Site: Barclays Center; Brooklyn, New York
- Champions: VCU (1st title)
- Winning coach: Shaka Smart (1st title)
- MVP: Treveon Graham (VCU)
- Television: NBCSN, CBSSN, CBS

2014–15 Atlantic 10 men's basketball standings
	Conf.				Overall
Team	W		L	PCT	W		L	PCT
Davidson	14	–	4	.778	24	–	8	.750
Dayton	13	–	5	.722	27	–	9	.750
Rhode Island	13	–	5	.722	23	–	10	.697
VCU †	12	–	6	.667	26	–	10	.722
Richmond	12	–	6	.667	21	–	14	.600
George Washington	10	–	8	.556	22	–	13	.629
St. Bonaventure	10	–	8	.556	18	–	13	.581
UMass	10	–	8	.556	17	–	15	.531
La Salle	8	–	10	.444	17	–	16	.515
Saint Joseph's	7	–	11	.389	13	–	18	.419
Duquesne	6	–	12	.333	12	–	19	.387
Fordham	4	–	14	.222	10	–	21	.323
George Mason	4	–	14	.222	9	–	22	.290
Saint Louis	3	–	15	.167	11	–	21	.344
† 2015 A10 tournament winner Rankings from AP poll

The 2015 Atlantic 10 men's basketball tournament was held March 11–15, 2015 at the Barclays Center in Brooklyn, New York. With Davidson joining the conference in July 2014, it was a 14-team tournament for the first time.

== Seeds ==
All 14 Atlantic 10 schools participate in the tournament. Teams were seeded by the 2014–15 Atlantic 10 Conference season record. The top 10 teams received a first round bye and the top four teams received a double bye.

Teams were seeded by record within the conference, with a tiebreaker system to seed teams with identical conference records.

Seed	School	Conference	Overall	Tiebreaker
1	Davidson	14–4	23–6	
2	Dayton	13–5	23–7	1–0 vs. Rhode Island
3	Rhode Island	13–5	21–8	0–1 vs. Dayton
4	Richmond	12–6	19–12	2–0 vs. VCU
5	VCU	12–6	22–9	0–2 vs. Richmond
6	George Washington	10–8	20–11	2–0 vs. St. Bonaventure, UMass
7	St. Bonaventure	10–8	17–12	1–2 vs. George Washington, UMass; 1–0 vs. Davidson
8	UMass	10–8	17–14	1-2 vs. George Washington, St. Bonaventure; 0–1 vs. Davidson
9	La Salle	8–10	16–15	
10	Saint Joseph's	7–11	13–17	
11	Duquesne	6–12	11–18	
12	Fordham	4–14	9–20	1–0 vs. George Mason
13	George Mason	4–14	9–21	0–1 vs. Fordham
14	Saint Louis	3–15	11–20	

== Schedule ==
Session	Game	Time*	Matchup^{#}	Television	Score
First round - Wednesday, March 11
1	1	6:30 pm	#12 Fordham vs. #13 George Mason	SNY/A-10 Network	71–65
1	2	9:00 pm	#11 Duquesne vs. #14 Saint Louis	SNY/A-10 Network	61–55
Second round - Thursday, March 12
2	3	12:00 pm	#8 UMass vs. #9 La Salle	NBCSN	69–76
2	4	2:30 pm	#5 VCU vs. #12 Fordham	NBCSN	63–57
3	5	6:30 pm	#7 St. Bonaventure vs. #10 St. Joseph's	NBCSN	60–49
3	6	9:00 pm	#6 George Washington vs. #11 Duquesne	NBCSN	73–55
Quarterfinals - Friday, March 13
4	7	12:00 pm	#1 Davidson vs. #9 La Salle	NBCSN	67–66
4	8	2:30 pm	#4 Richmond vs. #5 VCU	NBCSN	67–70
5	9	6:30 pm	#2 Dayton vs. #7 St. Bonaventure	NBCSN	75–71
5	10	9:00 pm	#3 Rhode Island vs. #6 George Washington	NBCSN	71–58
Semifinals - Saturday, March 14
6	11	1:30 pm	#1 Davidson vs. #5 VCU	CBSSN	73–93
6	12	4:00 pm	#2 Dayton vs. #3 Rhode Island	CBSSN	56–52
Championship - Sunday, March 15
7	13	1:00pm	#2 Dayton vs. #5 VCU	CBS	65–71

*Game times in Eastern Time. #Rankings denote tournament seeding.

== Bracket ==
First round Wednesday, March 11
12	Fordham	71
13	George Mason	65
11	Duquesne	61
14	Saint Louis	55

Second round Thursday, March 12; NBCSN
8	UMass	69
9	La Salle	76
5	VCU	63
12	Fordham	57
7	St. Bonaventure	60
10	Saint Joseph's	49
6	George Washington	73
11	Duquesne	55

Quarterfinals; Friday, March 13; NBCSN
1	#24 Davidson	67
9	La Salle	66
4	Richmond	67
5	VCU	70
2	Dayton	75
7	St. Bonaventure	71
3	Rhode Island	71
6	George Washington	58

Semifinals; Saturday, March 14; CBSSN
1	#24 Davidson	73
5	VCU	93
2	Dayton	56
3	Rhode Island	52

Championship; Sunday, March 15; CBS
5	VCU	71
2	Dayton	65

== See also ==
- 2015 Atlantic 10 women's basketball tournament
