= 2014–15 UMass Minutemen basketball team =

American college basketball season

2014–15 UMass Minutemen men's basketball
- Conference: Atlantic 10 Conference
- Record: 17–15 (10–8 A-10)
- Head coach: Derek Kellogg (7th season)
- Assistant coaches: Shyrone Chatman; Adam Ginsburg; Andy Allison
- Home arena: William D. Mullins Memorial Center

2014–15 Atlantic 10 men's basketball standings
	Conf.				Overall
Team	W		L	PCT	W		L	PCT
Davidson	14	–	4	.778	24	–	8	.750
Dayton	13	–	5	.722	27	–	9	.750
Rhode Island	13	–	5	.722	23	–	10	.697
VCU †	12	–	6	.667	26	–	10	.722
Richmond	12	–	6	.667	21	–	14	.600
George Washington	10	–	8	.556	22	–	13	.629
St. Bonaventure	10	–	8	.556	18	–	13	.581
UMass	10	–	8	.556	17	–	15	.531
La Salle	8	–	10	.444	17	–	16	.515
Saint Joseph's	7	–	11	.389	13	–	18	.419
Duquesne	6	–	12	.333	12	–	19	.387
Fordham	4	–	14	.222	10	–	21	.323
George Mason	4	–	14	.222	9	–	22	.290
Saint Louis	3	–	15	.167	11	–	21	.344
† 2015 A10 tournament winner Rankings from AP poll

The 2014–15 UMass Minutemen basketball team represented the University of Massachusetts Amherst during the 2014–15 NCAA Division I men's basketball season. The Minutemen, led by seventh year head coach Derek Kellogg, played their home games at the William D. Mullins Memorial Center and were members of the Atlantic 10 Conference. They finished the season 17–15, 10–8 in A-10 play to finish in a three-way tie for sixth place. They lost in the second round of the A-10 tournament to La Salle.

During this season, in 2014, Derrick Gordon became the first openly gay player in Division I to play in a men's basketball game.

== Previous season ==
The Minutemen finished the season with an overall record of 24–9, with a record of 10–6 in the Atlantic 10 regular season for a tie for a fifth-place finish. In the 2014 Atlantic 10 tournament, the Minutemen were defeated by George Washington, 85–77 in the quarterfinals. They received an at-large bid to the 2014 NCAA Men's Division I Basketball Tournament which is their first time since 1998. They lost in the second round to Tennessee.

== Departures ==
Name	Number	Pos.	Height	Weight	Year	Hometown	Notes
Chaz Williams	3	G	5'9"	175	RS Senior	Brooklyn, NY	Graduated
Clyde Santee	5	G	6'7"	180	Freshman	Houston, TX	Transferred to Southeast Missouri State
Sampson Carter	22	F	6'8"	220	RS Senior	Baton Rouge, LA	Graduated
Raphiael Putney	34	F	6'9"	185	RS Senior	Woodbridge, VA	Graduated

== Incoming recruits ==
College recruiting information
Name	Hometown	School	Height	Weight	Commit date
Rashaan Armstead-Holloway; C	Elmer, NJ	Arthur P. Schalick High School	6 ft 10 in (2.08 m)	280 lb (130 kg)	Aug 12, 2013
Rashaan Armstead-Holloway; C	Recruit ratings: Scout: Rivals: (74)				
C.J. Anderson; SF	Memphis, TN	Whitehaven High School	6 ft 5 in (1.96 m)	175 lb (79 kg)	Sep 25, 2013
C.J. Anderson; SF	Recruit ratings: Scout: Rivals: (N/A)				
Overall recruit ranking:
Note: In many cases, Scout, Rivals, 247Sports, On3, and ESPN may conflict in their listings of height and weight.; In these cases, the average was taken. ESPN grades are on a 100-point scale.; Sources: "2014 Team Ranking". Rivals.

== Roster ==
2014–15 UMass Minutemen men's basketball team
Players
Coaches

Pos.	#	Name	Height	Weight	Year	Previous school	Hometown
G	0	Donte Clark	6 ft 4 in (1.93 m)	180 lb (82 kg)	Fr	Queen’s Grant HS; Hargrave Military Acad.	Chatham, VA
F	1	Maxie Esho	6 ft 8 in (2.03 m)	215 lb (98 kg)	RS Sr	Henry A. Wise HS; Lee Acad.	Upper Marlboro, MD
G	2	Derrick Gordon	6 ft 3 in (1.91 m)	205 lb (93 kg)	RS Jr	St. Patrick HS; Western Kentucky	Plainfield, NJ
G	4	Jabarie Hinds	5 ft 11 in (1.8 m)	185 lb (84 kg)	RS Jr	Mount Vernon HS; West Virginia	Mount Vernon, NY
C	11	Tyler Bergantino	6 ft 9 in (2.06 m)	250 lb (113 kg)	Jr	Nature Coast Technical HS	Spring Hill, FL
G	12	Trey Davis	6 ft 0 in (1.83 m)	185 lb (84 kg)	Jr	Woodrow Wilson HS	DeSoto, TX
F	13	Zach Coleman	6 ft 7 in (2.01 m)	200 lb (91 kg)	RS Fr	Woodrow Wilson HS	Dallas, TX
G	20	Mike Wojewodzic (W)	6 ft 4 in (1.93 m)	215 lb (98 kg)	Jr	Boston Latin HS	Boston, MA
G	22	Demetrius Dayson	6 ft 5 in (1.96 m)	200 lb (91 kg)	So	Covington HS	Covington, TN
G	23	C. J. Anderson	6 ft 5 in (1.96 m)	175 lb (79 kg)	Fr	Whitehaven HS	Memphis, TN
F	24	Seth Berger	6 ft 7 in (2.01 m)	210 lb (95 kg)	So	Ballard HS	Seattle, WA
C	25	Cady Lalanne	6 ft 10 in (2.08 m)	253 lb (115 kg)	Sr	Oak Ridge HS	Orlando, FL
F	55	Zach Turcotte (W)	6 ft 7 in (2.01 m)	210 lb (95 kg)	So	Masconomet Regional HS	Boxford, MA

Head coach

- Derek Kellogg (UMass)

Assistant coach(es)

- Adam Ginsburg (Buffalo)
- Shyrone Chatman (Memphis)

Legend

- (C) Team captain
- (S) Suspended
- (I) Ineligible
- (W) Walk-on
- Injured
- Current redshirt

Roster

== Schedule ==
Date time, TV	Rank^{#}	Opponent^{#}	Result	Record	Site (attendance) city, state
Exhibition
10/30/2014*; 7:00 pm		American International	W 120–71		Mullins Center; Amherst, MA
Non-conference regular Season
11/14/2014*; 7:00 pm		Siena	W 95–87	1–0	Mullins Center (8,187); Amherst, MA
11/16/2014*; 3:00 pm, NESN		vs. Boston College; Commonwealth Classic/Coaches vs. Cancer Tip-Off	W 71–62	2–0	TD Garden (N/A); Boston, MA
11/18/2014*; 11:00 am, ESPN2		Manhattan; ESPN Tip-Off Marathon/Hall of Fame Tip-Off Classic	W 77–68 ^{OT}	3–0	Mullins Center (4,736); Amherst, MA
11/22/2014*; 12:00 pm, ESPN3		vs. Notre Dame; Hall of Fame Tip-Off Classic	L 68–81	3–1	Mohegan Sun Arena (N/A); Uncasville, CT
11/23/2014*; 12:00 pm, ESPNU		vs. Florida State; Hall of Fame Tip-Off Classic	W 75–69	4–1	Mohegan Sun Arena (6,513); Uncasville, CT
11/26/2014*; 2:00 pm		Northeastern; Hall of Fame Tip-Off Classic	W 79–54	5–1	Mullins Center (2,918); Amherst, MA
11/29/2014*; 2:00 pm, ESPN3		at Harvard	L 73–75	5–2	Lavietes Pavilion (2,195); Cambridge, MA
12/02/2014*; 7:00 pm, SECN		at LSU	L 60–82	5–3	Maravich Center (6,962); Baton Rouge, LA
12/07/2014*; 2:00 pm		vs. Florida Gulf Coast; Hall of Fame Holiday Classic	L 75–84	5–4	MassMutual Center (5,235); Springfield, MA
12/13/2014*; 4:00 pm		Canisius	W 75–58	6–4	Mullins Center (3,148); Amherst, MA
12/20/2014*; 1:00 pm, CBSSN		at Providence	L 65–85	6–5	Dunkin' Donuts Center (7,975); Providence, RI
12/23/2014*; 4:00 pm, BYUtv		at BYU	L 71–77 ^{OT}	6–6	Marriott Center (15,789); Provo, UT
12/30/2014*; 7:00 pm		Iona	W 87–82	7–6	Mullins Center (4,011); Amherst, MA
Atlantic 10 regular Season
01/03/2015; 4:00 pm		St. Bonaventure	L 55–69	7–7 (0–1)	Mullins Center (4,506); Amherst, MA
01/07/2015; 7:00 pm		at La Salle	W 71–65	8–7 (1–1)	Tom Gola Arena (1,379); Philadelphia, PA
01/11/2015; 1:00 pm		at George Mason	W 66–62	9–7 (2–1)	Patriot Center (3,535); Fairfax, VA
01/14/2015; 7:00 pm		Davidson	L 63–71	9–8 (2–2)	Mullins Center (3,205); Amherst, MA
01/17/2015; 2:30 pm, NBCSN		Rhode Island	W 60–56	10–8 (3–2)	Mullins Center (5,273); Amherst, MA
01/21/2015; 7:00 pm, CBSSN		at Saint Joseph's	W 62–56	10–9 (3–3)	Hagan Arena (3,687); Philadelphia, PA
01/29/2015; 7:00 pm, ESPNU		Dayton	W 66–64	11–9 (4–3)	Mullins Center (5,633); Amherst, MA
01/31/2015; 4:00 pm, CBSSN		at Saint Louis	W 60–56	12–9 (5–3)	Chaifetz Arena (9,104); St. Louis, MO
02/04/2015; 7:00 pm, SNY		at Fordham	W 78–72	13–9 (6–3)	Rose Hill Gymnasium (1,636); Bronx, NY
02/08/2015; 4:00 pm, CBSSN		La Salle	W 66–59	14–9 (7–3)	Mullins Center (4,673); Amherst, MA
02/11/2015; 7:00 pm		at St. Bonaventure	W 55–53	15–9 (8–3)	Reilly Center (3,786); Olean, NY
02/14/2015; 4:00 pm		Duquesne	W 82–74	16–9 (9–3)	Mullins Center (4,437); Amherst, MA
02/18/2015; 7:00 pm, SNY		at Rhode Island	L 59–75	16–10 (9–4)	Ryan Center (7,118); Kingston, RI
02/21/2015; 12:00 pm, ESPN2		at No. 25 VCU	L 72–78	16–11 (9–5)	Siegel Center (7,657); Richmond, VA
02/25/2015; 7:00 pm		Saint Joseph's	L 71–82	16–12 (9–6)	Mullins Center (3,234); Amherst, MA
02/28/2015; 4:00 pm		Fordham	W 82–74	17–12 (10–6)	Mullins Center (5,238); Amherst, MA
03/04/2015; 7:00 pm		Richmond	L 53–56	17–13 (10–7)	Mullins Center (3,857); Amherst, MA
03/07/2015; 3:30 pm, NBCSN		at George Washington	L 65–87	17–14 (10–8)	Charles E. Smith Center (3,867); Washington, D.C.
Atlantic 10 tournament
03/12/2015; 12:00 pm, NBCSN		vs. La Salle; Second Round	L 69–76	17–15	Barclays Center; Brooklyn, NY
*Non-conference game. ^{#}Rankings from AP Poll / Coaches' Poll. (#) Tournament seedings in parentheses. All times are in Eastern.

== See also ==
- 2014–15 UMass Minutewomen basketball team
