= 2014–15 George Mason Patriots men's basketball team =

American college basketball season

2014–15 George Mason Patriots men's basketball
- Conference: Atlantic 10 Conference
- Record: 9–22 (4–14 A-10)
- Head coach: Paul Hewitt (4th season)
- Assistant coaches: Roland Houston; Chris Kreider; Eric Skeeters
- Home arena: Patriot Center

2014–15 Atlantic 10 men's basketball standings
	Conf.				Overall
Team	W		L	PCT	W		L	PCT
Davidson	14	–	4	.778	24	–	8	.750
Dayton	13	–	5	.722	27	–	9	.750
Rhode Island	13	–	5	.722	23	–	10	.697
VCU †	12	–	6	.667	26	–	10	.722
Richmond	12	–	6	.667	21	–	14	.600
George Washington	10	–	8	.556	22	–	13	.629
St. Bonaventure	10	–	8	.556	18	–	13	.581
UMass	10	–	8	.556	17	–	15	.531
La Salle	8	–	10	.444	17	–	16	.515
Saint Joseph's	7	–	11	.389	13	–	18	.419
Duquesne	6	–	12	.333	12	–	19	.387
Fordham	4	–	14	.222	10	–	21	.323
George Mason	4	–	14	.222	9	–	22	.290
Saint Louis	3	–	15	.167	11	–	21	.344
† 2015 A10 tournament winner Rankings from AP poll

The 2014–15 George Mason Patriots men's basketball team represented George Mason University during the 2014–15 NCAA Division I men's basketball season. It was the 49th season for the program. The Patriots, led by fourth year head coach Paul Hewitt, competed in their second season in the Atlantic 10 Conference. They finished the season 9–22, 4–14 in A-10 play to finish in a tie for twelfth place. They lost in first round of the A-10 tournament to Fordham.

On March 16, head coach Paul Hewitt was fired. He finished at George Mason with a four-year record of 66–67.

== Offseason ==
=== Departures ===
Name	Number	Pos.	Height	Weight	Year	Hometown	Notes
Bryon Allen	0	G	6'3"	202	Senior	Largo, MD	Graduated
Johnnie Williams	2	F	6'8"	260	RS Senior	Memphis, TN	Graduated
Jonathan Arledge	5	F	6'9"	236	Senior	Silver Springs, MD	Transferred to Old Dominion
Sherrod Wright	10	G	6'4"	202	RS Senior	Mount Vernon, NY	Graduated

=== Incoming transfers ===
Name	Number	Pos.	Height	Weight	Year	Hometown	Previous School
Shevon Thompson	14	C	7'0"	220	Junior	Clarendon, JA	Harcum College

== Awards ==
Atlantic 10 All-Conference Third Team

- Shevon Thompson

Atlantic 10 Rookie of the Week

- Isaiah Jackson - Mar. 2

== Roster ==
2014–15 George Mason Patriots men's basketball team
Players
Coaches

Pos.	#	Name	Height	Weight	Year	Previous school	Hometown
F	1	Vaughn Gray	6 ft 5 in (1.96 m)	192 lb (87 kg)	Sr	St. Benedict's	Elmwood Park, NJ
G	3	Patrick Holloway	6 ft 1 in (1.85 m)	167 lb (76 kg)	Jr	Paul VI	Stafford, VA
F/C	4	Erik Copes	6 ft 8 in (2.03 m)	240 lb (109 kg)	Sr	Imhotep Charter	Philadelphia, PA
F	5	Eric Lockett	6 ft 5 in (1.96 m)	189 lb (86 kg)	Fr	Whitefield Academy	Atlanta, GA
F	10	Marko Gujaničić	6 ft 8 in (2.03 m)	225 lb (102 kg)	Jr	Stoneridge Prep	Cacak, Serbia
G	12	Myles Tate	5 ft 7 in (1.7 m)	158 lb (72 kg)	RS So	Mars Hill University	Ashburn, VA
G	13	Corey Edwards	5 ft 11 in (1.8 m)	177 lb (80 kg)	Sr	Christ the King	Middle Village, NY
C	14	Shevon Thompson	6 ft 11 in (2.11 m)	232 lb (105 kg)	Jr	Harcum College	Clarendon Parish, Jamaica
F	15	Trey Porter	6 ft 10 in (2.08 m)	200 lb (91 kg)	Fr	Potomac Senior	Dumfries, VA
G	22	Marquise Moore	6 ft 1 in (1.85 m)	200 lb (91 kg)	So	Saint Thomas More	Queens, NY
F	23	Therence Mayimba	6 ft 7 in (2.01 m)	199 lb (90 kg)	Fr	St. James School	Hagerstown, MD
F	25	Julian Royal	6 ft 8 in (2.03 m)	232 lb (105 kg)	RS Jr	Milton	Alpharetta, GA
F	30	Michael Rudy	6 ft 7 in (2.01 m)	220 lb (100 kg)	RS So	Saint Thomas More	Falls Church, VA
F	31	Jalen Jenkins	6 ft 7 in (2.01 m)	225 lb (102 kg)	RS So	Cardinal Hayes	Brooklyn, NY
F	44	Isaiah Jackson	6 ft 6 in (1.98 m)	207 lb (94 kg)	Fr	The Villages Charter High School	Gainesville, FL

Head coach

- Paul Hewitt (St. John Fisher)

Assistant coach(es)

- Chris Kreider (Lebanon Valley)
- Roland Houston (Rhode Island)
- Eric Skeeters (Coppin State)

Legend

- (C) Team captain
- (S) Suspended
- (I) Ineligible
- (W) Walk-on
- Injured
- Current redshirt

Roster

== Stats ==
Player	GP	GS	MPG	FG%	3FG%	FT%	RPG	APG	SPG	BPG	PPG
Shevon Thompson	31	31	30.2	.555	.000	.619	11.3	0.2	0.5	1.1	12.5
Patrick Holloway	27	8	26.4	.390	.331	.826	1.2	0.7	0.7	0.0	10.9
Marquise Moore	29	28	30.3	.453	.300	.791	3.2	3.1	0.9	0.3	9.5
Isaiah Jackson	31	23	26.2	.348	.356	.706	3.9	1.3	0.8	0.0	8.7
Jalen Jenkins	31	23	22.3	.465	.333	.574	4.4	1.2	0.6	0.8	8.0
Corey Edwards	30	18	24.4	.354	.329	.750	1.7	2.5	1.5	0.0	4.9
Erik Copes	4	0	16.5	.500	.000	.818	4.3	0.5	0.0	1.0	4.8
Vaughn Gray	28	9	14.7	.322	.279	.391	1.3	0.4	0.5	0.1	3.6
Trey Porter	30	7	14.1	.468	.000	.604	2.6	0.2	0.4	1.1	3.5
Julian Royal	18	1	12.4	.358	.111	.667	2.4	0.2	0.2	0.3	3.4
Marko Gujanicic	25	7	11.3	.476	.300	.417	1.7	0.6	0.2	0.1	2.7
Eric Lockett	5	0	6.0	.250	.000	.600	0.4	0.4	0.2	0.2	1.0
Myles Tate	14	0	5.3	.308	.429	.000	1.0	0.5	0.2	0.0	0.8
Michael Rudy	4	0	1.3	1.000	.000	.000	0.0	0.0	0.0	0.0	0.5

== Schedule and results ==
Date time, TV	Opponent	Result	Record	High points	High rebounds	High assists	Site (attendance) city, state
Exhibition
November 8*; 4:00 pm	Shenandoah	W 91–51		17 – Jenkins	9 – Royal	5 – Jenkins	Patriot Center (2,275); Fairfax, VA
Non-conference regular season
November 14*; 7:30 pm	Cornell	L 60–68	0–1	22 – Holloway	10 – Thompson	7 – Moore	Patriot Center (6,007); Fairfax, VA
November 16*; 1:00 pm	Princeton	W 63–60	1–1	19 – Holloway	9 – Thompson	3 – Jenkins	Patriot Center (3,097); Fairfax, VA
November 20*; 7:30 pm, ESPNU	vs. West Virginia; Puerto Rico Tip-Off quarterfinals	L 65–91	1–2	17 – Holloway	6 – Thompson	3 – Jackson	Roberto Clemente Coliseum (6,723); San Juan, PR
November 21*; 7:00 pm, ESPN3	vs. New Mexico; Puerto Rico Tip-Off consolation round	L 58–69	1–3	21 – Thompson	19 – Thompson	2 – Edwards, Jackson, Moore	Roberto Clemente Coliseum (7,438); San Juan, PR
November 23*; 11:30 am	vs. College of Charleston; Puerto Rico Tip-Off 7th place game	L 60–61	1–4	12 – Thompson	14 – Thompson	3 – Jenkins	Roberto Clemente Coliseum (8,002); San Juan, PR
November 29*; 4:00 pm	Manhattan	W 64–63	2–4	24 – Jenkins	9 – Thompson	3 – Edwards, Moore	Patriot Center (2,773); Fairfax, VA
December 3*; 7:30 pm	Old Dominion	L 69–75	2–5	22 – Moore	7 – Thompson	2 – Edwards, Jenkins, Moore	Patriot Center (5,022); Fairfax, VA
December 6*; 8:00 pm	at Northern Iowa	L 65–71 ^{OT}	2–6	20 – Moore	11 – Thompson	2 – Jenkins, Moore	McLeod Center (4,525); Cedar Falls, IA
December 17*; 7:00 pm	Catawba	W 99–69	3–6	29 – Thompson	10 – Thompson	4 – Gujanicic, Moore	Recreation Athletic Complex (1,280); Fairfax, VA
December 20*; 7:00 pm, NBCSN	Iona	W 86–81	4–6	23 – Moore	15 – Thompson	3 – Jenkins, Moore	Patriot Center (3,016); Fairfax, VA
December 23*; 7:00 pm	at Wright State	W 68–60	5–6	24 – Thompson	14 – Thompson	5 – Holloway	Nutter Center (4,685); Dayton, OH
December 31*; 5:00 pm	at No. 18 Oklahoma	L 43–61	5–7	9 – Jackson, Thompson	11 – Thompson	3 – Edwards	Lloyd Noble Center (10,597); Norman, OK
Atlantic 10 regular season
January 3; 7:00 pm	La Salle	W 70–62	6–7 (1–0)	13 – Holloway, Jackson, Jenkins, Thompson	7 – Thompson	7 – Edwards	Patriot Center (3,376); Fairfax, VA
January 8; 7:00 pm, NBCSN	at Richmond	L 65–75	6–8 (1–1)	19 – Thompson	17 – Thompson	4 – Edwards	Robins Center (4,395); Richmond, VA
January 11; 1:00 pm	Massachusetts	L 62–66	6–9 (1–2)	12 – Thompson	16 – Thompson	4 – Jenkins	Patriot Center (3,535); Fairfax, VA
January 14; 7:00 pm, MASN	vs. St. Bonaventure; Conference Classic	L 55–75	6–10 (1–3)	18 – Thompson	9 – Edwards	3 – Edwards, Moore	Blue Cross Arena (4,032); Rochester, NY
January 17; 4:30 pm, NBCSN	at George Washington	L 53–63	6–11 (1–4)	13 – Edwards	11 – Thompson	4 – Moore	Charles E. Smith Center (4,313); Washington, D.C.
January 24; 7:00 pm	Davidson	L 73–80 ^{OT}	6–12 (1–5)	18 – Moore	15 – Thompson	3 – Moore	Patriot Center (5,508); Fairfax, VA
January 29; 7:00 pm, CSNMA	Saint Louis	W 68–60	7–12 (2–5)	19 – Thompson	14 – Thompson	5 – Moore	Patriot Center (3,822); Fairfax, VA
January 31; 7:00 pm	at Duquesne	L 53–62	7–13 (2–6)	12 – Jackson	10 – Thompson	3 – Edwards, Moore, Tate	Palumbo Center (3,012); Pittsburgh, PA
February 4; 7:00 pm, CBSSN	No. 18 VCU; Rivalry	L 60–72	7–14 (2–7)	15 – Jenkins	16 – Thompson	4 – Edwards	Patriot Center (6,473); Fairfax, VA
February 7; 4:00 pm, MASN	at Saint Joseph's	L 54–58	7–15 (2–8)	16 – Holloway	16 – Thompson	5 – Edwards	Hagan Arena (4,200); Philadelphia, PA
February 11; 7:00 pm	at Davidson	L 71–92	7–16 (2–9)	14 – Thompson	13 – Thompson	4 – Edwards	John M. Belk Arena (3,938); Davidson, NC
February 14; 4:00 pm, MASN	Richmond; Homecoming	W 71–67 ^{OT}	8–16 (3–9)	15 – Jenkins, Thompson	14 – Thompson	2 – Jackson, Moore	Patriot Center (6,018); Fairfax, VA
February 18; 7:00 pm	Fordham	L 68–80	8–17 (3–10)	19 – Thompson	10 – Thompson	5 – Moore	Patriot Center (2,682); Fairfax, VA
February 21; 4:00 pm	Rhode Island	L 56–71	8–18 (3–11)	15 – Thompson	14 – Thompson	3 – Edwards	Patriot Center (4,740); Fairfax, VA
February 25; 7:00 pm	at Dayton	L 63–76	8–19 (3–12)	13 – Jackson	7 – Jackson	4 – Moore	UD Arena (12,861); Dayton, OH
February 28; 7:00 pm	at Saint Louis	W 78–50	9–19 (4–12)	18 – Jackson	10 – Jenkins	6 – Moore	Chaifetz Arena (5,828); St. Louis, MO
March 4; 7:00 pm, CSNMA	George Washington	L 51–67	9–20 (4–13)	12 – Moore	9 – Thompson	4 – Edwards	Patriot Center (3,888); Fairfax, VA
March 7; 5:30 pm, NBCSN	at VCU; Rivalry	L 60–71	9–21 (4–14)	16 – Jackson, Thompson	15 – Thompson	6 – Moore	Siegel Center; Richmond, VA
Atlantic 10 tournament
March 11; 6:30 pm	vs. Fordham; First Round	L 65–71	9–22	18 – Jackson, Moore	5 – Jenkins, Moore, Thompson	5 – Moore	Barclays Center; Brooklyn, NY
*Non-conference game. ^{#}Rankings from AP Poll. (#) Tournament seedings in parentheses. All times are in Eastern Time.

== Recruiting ==
The following is a list of players signed for the 2015–16 season:

College recruiting information
Name	Hometown	School	Height	Weight	Commit date
Ahmad Gilbert; F	Philadelphia, PA	Constitution High School	6 ft 6 in (1.98 m)	180 lb (82 kg)	Aug 15, 2014
Ahmad Gilbert; F	Recruit ratings: Scout: Rivals: (72)				
Overall recruit ranking:
Note: In many cases, Scout, Rivals, 247Sports, On3, and ESPN may conflict in their listings of height and weight.; In these cases, the average was taken. ESPN grades are on a 100-point scale.; Sources: "ESPN". ESPN.; "2015 Team Ranking". Rivals.

== See also ==
2014–15 George Mason Patriots women's basketball team
