= 2014–15 Fordham Rams men's basketball team =

American college basketball season

2014–15 Fordham Rams men's basketball
- Conference: Atlantic 10
- Record: 10–21 (4–14 A-10)
- Head coach: Tom Pecora (5th season)
- Assistant coaches: Tom Parrotta; John Morton; Michael DePaoli
- Home arena: Rose Hill Gymnasium

2014–15 Atlantic 10 men's basketball standings
| | Conf. | | | | Overall |
| Team | W | | L | PCT | W | | L | PCT |
|---|---|---|---|---|---|---|---|---|
| Davidson | 14 | – | 4 | .778 | 24 | – | 8 | .750 |
| Dayton | 13 | – | 5 | .722 | 27 | – | 9 | .750 |
| Rhode Island | 13 | – | 5 | .722 | 23 | – | 10 | .697 |
| VCU † | 12 | – | 6 | .667 | 26 | – | 10 | .722 |
| Richmond | 12 | – | 6 | .667 | 21 | – | 14 | .600 |
| George Washington | 10 | – | 8 | .556 | 22 | – | 13 | .629 |
| St. Bonaventure | 10 | – | 8 | .556 | 18 | – | 13 | .581 |
| UMass | 10 | – | 8 | .556 | 17 | – | 15 | .531 |
| La Salle | 8 | – | 10 | .444 | 17 | – | 16 | .515 |
| Saint Joseph's | 7 | – | 11 | .389 | 13 | – | 18 | .419 |
| Duquesne | 6 | – | 12 | .333 | 12 | – | 19 | .387 |
| Fordham | 4 | – | 14 | .222 | 10 | – | 21 | .323 |
| George Mason | 4 | – | 14 | .222 | 9 | – | 22 | .290 |
| Saint Louis | 3 | – | 15 | .167 | 11 | – | 21 | .344 |
† 2015 A10 tournament winner Rankings from AP poll

The 2014–15 Fordham Rams men's basketball team represented Fordham University during the 2014–15 NCAA Division I men's basketball season. The team is coached by Tom Pecora in his fifth year at the school. Fordham Rams home games were played at Rose Hill Gymnasium and the team was a member of the Atlantic 10 Conference. They finished the season 10–21, 4–14 in A-10 play to finish in a tie for twelfth place. They advanced to the second round of the A-10 tournament where they lost to VCU.

On March 18, head coach Tom Pecora was fired. He finished at Fordham with a five year record of 44–106.

== Previous season ==
The Rams finished the season 10–21, 4–14 in A-10 play to finish in last place. They advanced to the second round of the A-10 tournament where they lost to Dayton.

== Departures ==
| Name | Number | Pos. | Height | Weight | Year | Hometown | Notes |
|---|---|---|---|---|---|---|---|
| Branden Frazier | 0 | G | 6'3" | 170 | Senior | Brooklyn, NY | Graduated |
| Travion Leonard | 2 | F | 6'8" | 275 | Sophomore | Raleigh, NC | Transferred to Barry |
| Jake Fay | 12 | G | 6'6" | 195 | Freshman | Lynn, MA | Transferred to Hartford |
| Chris Whitehead | 13 | G | 5'9" | 190 | Junior | New Albany, NY | Transferred to Bellarmine |
| Jared Fay | 20 | G | 6'3" | 170 | Sophomore | Lynn, MA | Transferred to Dominican College |
| Jermaine Meyers | 22 | G | 6'0" | 180 | Sophomore | Ajax, ON | Transferred to Northwood (MI) |
| Leo Walsh | 25 | G | 6'4" | 198 | Senior | Clarks Green, PA | Graduated |
| Victor Ieronymides | 33 | G/F | 6'6" | 208 | Freshman | Nicosia, Cyprus | Transferred to Saint Martin's |
| Khalid Robinson | 35 | G | 6'3" | 200 | RS Senior | Harlem, NY | Graduated |

== Incoming recruits ==
College recruiting
| Name | Hometown | School | Height | Weight | Commit date |
|---|---|---|---|---|---|
| Eric Paschall; PF | Dobbs Ferry, NY | Dobbs Ferry High School | 6 ft 6 in (1.98 m) | 205 lb (93 kg) | Apr 4, 2013 |
| Eric Paschall; PF | Recruit ratings: Scout: Rivals: (70) | | | | |
| Nemanja Zarkovic; PG | Montreal, QE | Collège Jean-de-Brébeuf | 6 ft 3 in (1.91 m) | 195 lb (88 kg) | Apr 16, 2014 |
| Nemanja Zarkovic; PG | Recruit ratings: Scout: Rivals: (N/R) | | | | |
| Christian Sengfelder; PF | Schelklingen, GER | Urspring High School | 6 ft 6 in (1.98 m) | N/A | May 1, 2014 |
| Christian Sengfelder; PF | Recruit ratings: Scout: Rivals: (N/R) | | | | |
| Zaire Thompson; PG | Germany, EUR | Erdgas Ehingen | 5 ft 11 in (1.80 m) | N/A | May 22, 2014 |
| Zaire Thompson; PG | Recruit ratings: Scout: Rivals: (N/R) | | | | |
Overall recruit ranking:
Note: In many cases, Scout, Rivals, 247Sports, On3, and ESPN may conflict in their listings of height and weight.; In these cases, the average was taken. ESPN grades are on a 100-point scale.; Sources: "2014 Team Ranking". Rivals.

== Roster ==
2014–15 Fordham Rams men's basketball team
Players
Coaches

| Pos. | # | Name | Height | Weight | Year | Hometown |
|---|---|---|---|---|---|---|
| G | 0 | Antwoine Anderson | 6 ft 1 in (1.85 m) | 190 lb (86 kg) | So | Rochester, NY |
| G | 1 | Mandell Thomas | 6 ft 2 in (1.88 m) | 185 lb (84 kg) | Jr | Rochester, NY |
| G | 3 | Nemanja Zarkovic | 6 ft 3 in (1.91 m) | 185 lb (84 kg) | Fr | Montreal, QE |
| F | 4 | Eric Paschall | 6 ft 6 in (1.98 m) | 205 lb (93 kg) | Fr | Dobbs Ferry, NY |
| G | 10 | Jon Severe | 6 ft 3 in (1.91 m) | 185 lb (84 kg) | So | Brooklyn, NY |
| G | 13 | Matt Massimino | 5 ft 11 in (1.8 m) | 155 lb (70 kg) | So | New Hope, PA |
| G | 15 | Nihad Musovic | 6 ft 0 in (1.83 m) | 185 lb (84 kg) | Jr | Yonkers, NY |
| G | 24 | Bryan Smith (C) | 6 ft 2 in (1.88 m) | 190 lb (86 kg) | Sr | Brooklyn, NY |
| F | 30 | Ryan Rhoomes (C) | 6 ft 8 in (2.03 m) | 235 lb (107 kg) | Jr | South Jamaica, NY |
| G | 32 | DC Gaitley | 6 ft 1 in (1.85 m) | 190 lb (86 kg) | Sr | Haverford, PA |
| C | 42 | Ryan Canty | 6 ft 9 in (2.06 m) | 240 lb (109 kg) | Sr | Danvers, MA |
| F | 43 | Christian Sengfelder | 6 ft 7 in (2.01 m) | 238 lb (108 kg) | Fr | Leverkusen, Germany |
| F | 44 | Manny Suarez | 6 ft 10 in (2.08 m) | 225 lb (102 kg) | So | Cliffside Park, NJ |
| F | 55 | Dekeba Battee-Aston (W) | 6 ft 9 in (2.06 m) | 255 lb (116 kg) | Fr | Brisbane, Australia |

Head coach

- Tom Pecora (Adelphi)

Assistant coach(es)

- Tom Parrotta (Fordham)
- John Morton (Seton Hall)
- Michael DePaoli (Saint Rose)

Legend

- (C) Team captain
- (S) Suspended
- (I) Ineligible
- (W) Walk-on
- Injured
- Current redshirt

Roster

== Schedule and results ==
| Date time, TV | Opponent | Result | Record | Site (attendance) city, state |
Non-conference regular season
| 11/14/2014*; 8:00 pm | New York Tech | W 94–77 | 1–0 | Rose Hill Gymnasium (1,368); Bronx, NY |
| 11/16/2014*; 5:00 pm, BTN | at Penn State | L 54–73 | 1–1 | Bryce Jordan Center (8,607); University Park, PA |
| 11/20/2014*; 7:30 pm | at Maryland | L 50–66 | 1–2 | Xfinity Center (9,022); College Park, MD |
| 11/23/2014*; 6:00 pm, SNY | UMass Lowell | L 57–64 | 1–3 | Rose Hill Gymnasium (1,122); Bronx, NY |
| 11/29/2014*; 4:00 pm, SNY | Maryland Eastern Shore | L 66–72 | 1–4 | Rose Hill Gymnasium (2,132); Bronx, NY |
| 12/01/2014*; 7:00 pm, SNY | Siena | W 69–67 | 2–4 | Rose Hill Gymnasium (1,235); Bronx, NY |
| 12/10/2014*; 7:00 pm, SNY | Monmouth | W 68–58 ^{OT} | 3–4 | Rose Hill Gymnasium (1,130); Bronx, NY |
| 12/14/2014*; 1:30 pm, FSN | at No. 24 St. John's; Rivalry/Madison Square Garden Holiday Festival | L 53–74 | 3–5 | Madison Square Garden (8,074); New York City, NY |
| 12/22/2014*; 6:00 pm, SNY | vs. Manhattan; Rivalry/Brooklyn Hoops Holiday Invitational | L 57–71 | 3–6 | Barclays Center (6,519); Brooklyn, NY |
| 12/28/2014*; 6:00 pm, SNY | Howard | W 74–59 | 4–6 | Rose Hill Gymnasium (1,568); Bronx, NY |
| 12/31/2014*; 12:00 pm, SNY | South Carolina State | W 74–54 | 5–6 | Rose Hill Gymnasium (1,262); Bronx, NY |
Atlantic 10 regular season
| 01/04/2015; 1:00 pm, CBSSN | VCU | L 58–75 | 5–7 (0–1) | Rose Hill Gymnasium (2,719); Bronx, NY |
| 01/07/2015; 7:00 pm | at Rhode Island | L 65–68 | 5–8 (0–2) | Ryan Center (4,810); Kingston, RI |
| 01/10/2015; 7:00 pm | Dayton | L 58–76 | 5–9 (0–3) | Rose Hill Gymnasium (2,872); Bronx, NY |
| 01/14/2015; 7:00 pm | at Saint Joseph's | L 55–66 | 5–10 (0–4) | Hagan Arena (3,851); Philadelphia, PA |
| 01/17/2015; 2:00 pm | at La Salle | L 49–60 | 5–11 (0–5) | Tom Gola Arena (2,311); Philadelphia, PA |
| 01/22/2015; 7:00 pm, NBCSN | George Washington | L 59–79 | 5–12 (0–6) | Rose Hill Gymnasium (2,316); Bronx, NY |
| 01/28/2015; 7:00 pm | Rhode Island | L 63–64 | 5–13 (0–7) | Rose Hill Gymnasium (1,622); Bronx, NY |
| 02/01/2015; 2:00 pm | at Dayton | L 77–101 | 5–14 (0–8) | UD Arena (13,106); Dayton, OH |
| 02/04/2015; 7:00 pm, SNY | Massachusetts | L 72–78 | 5–15 (0–9) | Rose Hill Gymnasium (1,636); Bronx, NY |
| 02/07/2015; 4:00 pm, NBCSN | Saint Louis | W 83–65 | 6–15 (1–9) | Rose Hill Gymnasium (2,871); Bronx, NY |
| 02/11/2015; 7:00 pm | at Richmond | L 71–73 | 6–16 (1–10) | Robins Center (5,524); Richmond, VA |
| 02/15/2015; 2:30 pm, NBCSN | Saint Joseph's | W 69–55 | 7–16 (2–10) | Rose Hill Gymnasium (2,885); Bronx, NY |
| 02/18/2015; 7:00 pm | at George Mason | W 80–68 | 8–16 (3–10) | Patriot Center (2,682); Fairfax, VA |
| 02/21/2015; 7:00 pm | at Davidson | L 57–76 | 8–17 (3–11) | John M. Belk Arena (5,084); Davidson, NC |
| 02/25/2015; 7:00 pm | La Salle | W 63–48 | 9–17 (4–11) | Rose Hill Gymnasium (1,586); Bronx, NY |
| 02/28/2015; 4:00 pm | at Massachusetts | L 74–82 | 9–18 (4–12) | Mullins Center (5,238); Amherst, MA |
| 03/04/2015; 7:00 pm | Duquesne | L 66–81 | 9–19 (4–13) | Rose Hill Gymnasium (1,652); Bronx, NY |
| 03/07/2015; 4:00 pm | at St. Bonaventure | L 52–66 | 9–20 (4–14) | Reilly Center (3,555); Olean, NY |
Atlantic 10 tournament
| 03/11/2015; 6:30 pm | vs. George Mason; First Round | W 71–65 | 10–20 | Barclays Center; Brooklyn, NY |
| 03/12/2015; 2:30 pm, NBCSN | vs. VCU; Second Round | L 57–63 | 10–21 | Barclays Center; Brooklyn, NY |
*Non-conference game. ^{#}Rankings from AP Poll. (#) Tournament seedings in parentheses. All times are in Eastern Time.

== See also ==
2014–15 Fordham Rams women's basketball team
