= 2014–15 Davidson Wildcats men's basketball team =

American college basketball season

2014–15 Davidson Wildcats men's basketball

Atlantic 10 regular season champions

NCAA tournament, round of 64
- Conference: Atlantic 10 Conference
- Record: 24–8 (14–4 A-10)
- Head coach: Bob McKillop (26th season)
- Assistant coaches: Matt McKillop (7th year); Ryan Mee (3rd year); Will Reigel (1st year); Will Thoni (1st year)
- Home arena: John M. Belk Arena (5,223)

2014–15 Atlantic 10 men's basketball standings
| | Conf. | | | | Overall |
| Team | W | | L | PCT | W | | L | PCT |
|---|---|---|---|---|---|---|---|---|
| Davidson | 14 | – | 4 | .778 | 24 | – | 8 | .750 |
| Dayton | 13 | – | 5 | .722 | 27 | – | 9 | .750 |
| Rhode Island | 13 | – | 5 | .722 | 23 | – | 10 | .697 |
| VCU † | 12 | – | 6 | .667 | 26 | – | 10 | .722 |
| Richmond | 12 | – | 6 | .667 | 21 | – | 14 | .600 |
| George Washington | 10 | – | 8 | .556 | 22 | – | 13 | .629 |
| St. Bonaventure | 10 | – | 8 | .556 | 18 | – | 13 | .581 |
| UMass | 10 | – | 8 | .556 | 17 | – | 15 | .531 |
| La Salle | 8 | – | 10 | .444 | 17 | – | 16 | .515 |
| Saint Joseph's | 7 | – | 11 | .389 | 13 | – | 18 | .419 |
| Duquesne | 6 | – | 12 | .333 | 12 | – | 19 | .387 |
| Fordham | 4 | – | 14 | .222 | 10 | – | 21 | .323 |
| George Mason | 4 | – | 14 | .222 | 9 | – | 22 | .290 |
| Saint Louis | 3 | – | 15 | .167 | 11 | – | 21 | .344 |
† 2015 A10 tournament winner Rankings from AP poll

The 2014–15 Davidson Wildcats men's basketball team represented Davidson College during the 2014–15 NCAA Division I men's basketball season. The Wildcats, led by 26th year head coach Bob McKillop, played their home games at the John M. Belk Arena and were first year members of the Atlantic 10 Conference. They finished the season 24–8, 14–4 in A-10 play to win the A-10 regular season championship. They advanced to the semifinals of the A-10 tournament where they lost to VCU. They received an at-large bid to the NCAA tournament where they lost in the second round to Iowa.

== Previous season ==
The 2013–14 Davidson Wildcats finished the season with an overall record of 20–13, with a record of 15–1 in the Southern Conference regular season to capture the Southern Conference regular season champions. In the 2014 SoCon tournament, the Wildcats were defeated by Western Carolina, 99–97 in overtime in the semifinals. As a regular season conference champion who failed to win their conference tournament, they received an automatic bid to the National Invitation Tournament where they lost in the first round to Missouri.

== Off season ==
=== Departures ===
| Name | Number | Pos. | Height | Weight | Year | Hometown | Notes |
|---|---|---|---|---|---|---|---|
| Ryan Ansel | 2 | G | 6'2" | 180 | Senior | Fort Washington, PA | Graduated |
| Joe Aase | 13 | G | 6'8" | 215 | Freshman | Austin, MN | Transferred to Minnesota State |
| Clay Tormey | 14 | G | 5'11" | 165 | Senior | Chicago, IL | Graduated |
| Tom Droney | 23 | G | 6'6" | 200 | Senior | Pittsburgh, PA | Graduated |
| De'Mon Brooks | 24 | F | 6'7" | 227 | Senior | Charlotte, NC | Graduated |
| Chris Czerapowicz | 35 | G | 6'7" | 200 | Senior | Gothenburg, Sweden | Graduated |
| Will Thoni | 41 | G | 6'3" | 215 | Senior | Sewanee, TN | Graduated |

== Incoming recruits ==
College recruiting information
| Name | Hometown | School | Height | Weight | Commit date |
|---|---|---|---|---|---|
| Jordan Watkins; SG | Charlotte, NC | Providence Day School | 6 ft 0 in (1.83 m) | 155 lb (70 kg) | Nov 15, 2012 |
| Jordan Watkins; SG | Recruit ratings: Scout: Rivals: (69) | | | | |
| Rusty Reigel; SG | Charlotte, NC | Charlotte Latin School | 6 ft 2 in (1.88 m) | 190 lb (86 kg) | Sep 15, 2013 |
| Rusty Reigel; SG | Recruit ratings: Scout: Rivals: (60) | | | | |
| Peyton Aldridge; PF | Leavittsburg, OH | La Brae High School | 6 ft 6 in (1.98 m) | 195 lb (88 kg) | Sep 7, 2013 |
| Peyton Aldridge; PF | Recruit ratings: Scout: Rivals: (NR) | | | | |
| Nathan Ekwu; SF | Bronx, NY | Cardinal Hayes High School | 6 ft 7 in (2.01 m) | 235 lb (107 kg) | Apr 4, 2014 |
| Nathan Ekwu; SF | Recruit ratings: Scout: Rivals: (NR) | | | | |
Overall recruit ranking:
Note: In many cases, Scout, Rivals, 247Sports, On3, and ESPN may conflict in their listings of height and weight.; In these cases, the average was taken. ESPN grades are on a 100-point scale.; Sources: "2014 Team Ranking". Rivals.

== Roster ==
2014–15 Davidson Wildcats men's basketball team
Players
Coaches

| Pos. | # | Name | Height | Weight | Year | Hometown |
|---|---|---|---|---|---|---|
| F | 1 | Nathan Ekwu | 6 ft 7 in (2.01 m) | 235 lb (107 kg) | Fr | Enugu, Nigeria |
| G | 2 | Jordan Watkins | 6 ft 1 in (1.85 m) | 160 lb (73 kg) | Fr | Charlotte, North Carolina |
| G | 3 | Brian Sullivan | 5 ft 11 in (1.8 m) | 175 lb (79 kg) | Jr | Arlington, Ohio |
| G | 4 | Tyler Kalinoski | 6 ft 4 in (1.93 m) | 180 lb (82 kg) | Sr | Overland Park, Kansas |
| G | 5 | Jordan Barham | 6 ft 4 in (1.93 m) | 210 lb (95 kg) | Jr | Cleveland, Ohio |
| G | 12 | Jack Gibbs | 5 ft 11 in (1.8 m) | 195 lb (88 kg) | So | Westerville, Ohio |
| F | 15 | Oskar Michelsen | 6 ft 9 in (2.06 m) | 210 lb (95 kg) | Fr | Helsinki, Finland |
| F | 22 | Ali Mackay | 6 ft 11 in (2.11 m) | 215 lb (98 kg) | Sr | North Berwick, Scotland |
| F | 23 | Peyton Aldridge | 6 ft 7 in (2.01 m) | 205 lb (93 kg) | Fr | Warren, Ohio |
| F | 25 | Jake Belford | 6 ft 9 in (2.06 m) | 210 lb (95 kg) | Jr | Battle Ground, Washington |
| G | 31 | Manu Giamoukis | 6 ft 1 in (1.85 m) | 180 lb (82 kg) | So | Thessaloniki, Greece |
| G | 32 | Rusty Reigel | 6 ft 2 in (1.88 m) | 190 lb (86 kg) | Fr | Charlotte, North Carolina |
| F | 34 | Connor Perkey | 6 ft 8 in (2.03 m) | 195 lb (88 kg) | Jr | Atlanta, Georgia |
| F | 40 | Andrew McAuliffe | 6 ft 8 in (2.03 m) | 235 lb (107 kg) | So | Northbrook, Illinois |

Head coach

- Bob McKillop (Hofstra)

Assistant coach(es)

- Matt McKillop (Davidson)
- Ryan Mee (Rochester)
- Will Reigel (Davidson)

Legend

- (C) Team captain
- (S) Suspended
- (I) Ineligible
- (W) Walk-on
- Injured
- Current redshirt

Roster

== Schedule ==
| Date time, TV | Rank^{#} | Opponent^{#} | Result | Record | Site (attendance) city, state |
Exhibition
| 11/11/2014*; 7:00 pm | | Lenoir–Rhyne | W 83–56 | | John M. Belk Arena (2,629); Davidson, NC |
Non-conference regular season
| 11/15/2014*; 2:00 pm, MI-Ch 4 | | Catholic | W 102–66 | 1–0 | John M. Belk Arena (3,884); Davidson, NC |
| 11/18/2014*; 7:00 pm, TWCSC | | Campbell | W 86–51 | 2–0 | John M. Belk Arena (3,164); Davidson, NC |
| 11/22/2014*; 2:00 pm, TWCSC | | vs. No. 6 North Carolina | L 72–90 | 2–1 | Time Warner Cable Arena (11,113); Charlotte, NC |
| 11/26/2014*; 7:00 pm, ESPN3 | | at UCF | W 95–69 | 3–1 | CFE Arena (3,458); Orlando, FL |
| 11/29/2014*; 2:00 pm, TWCSC | | UNC Wilmington | W 72–49 | 4–1 | John M. Belk Arena (3,131); Davidson, NC |
| 12/03/2014*; 7:00 pm, TWCSC | | Charlotte | W 92–86 | 5–1 | John M. Belk Arena (4,606); Davidson, NC |
| 12/06/2014*; 4:00 pm, MI-Ch 4 | | Stetson | W 90–59 | 6–1 | John M. Belk Arena (3,132); Davidson, NC |
| 12/10/2014*; 9:00 pm | | at Montana | W 110–99 | 7–1 | Dahlberg Arena (3,172); Missoula, MT |
| 12/13/2014*; 7:00 pm, MI-Ch 4 | | Niagara | W 78–58 | 8–1 | John M. Belk Arena (3,244); Davidson, NC |
| 12/20/2014*; 4:00 pm, WCIV | | at College of Charleston | W 80–68 | 9–1 | TD Arena (3,671); Charleston, SC |
| 12/30/2014*; 6:00 pm, ESPNU | | at No. 3 Virginia | L 72–83 | 9–2 | John Paul Jones Arena (14,593); Charlottesville, VA |
Atlantic 10 regular season
| 01/03/2015; 5:00 pm, NBCSN | | Richmond | W 81–67 | 10–2 (1–0) | John M. Belk Arena (4,919); Davidson, NC |
| 01/07/2015; 7:00 pm, MASN | | at No. 20 VCU | L 65–71 | 10–3 (1–1) | Siegel Center (7,637); Richmond, VA |
| 01/10/2015; 7:00 pm, MI-Ch 4 | | Saint Louis | W 89–54 | 11–3 (2–1) | John M. Belk Arena (3,609); Davidson, NC |
| 01/14/2015; 7:00 pm | | at Massachusetts | W 71–63 | 12–3 (3–1) | Mullins Center (3,205); Amherst, MA |
| 01/17/2015; 6:00 pm | | at Richmond | L 63–89 | 12–4 (3–2) | Robins Center (7,201); Richmond, VA |
| 01/20/2015; 7:30 pm, CBSSN | | No. 22 Dayton | W 77–60 | 13–4 (4–2) | John M. Belk Arena (5,067); Davidson, NC |
| 01/24/2015; 7:00 pm | | at George Mason | W 80–73 ^{OT} | 14–4 (5–2) | Patriot Center (5,508); Fairfax, VA |
| 01/31/2015; 12:30 pm, NBCSN | | at Saint Joseph's | L 70–75 | 14–5 (5–3) | Hagan Arena (3,951); Philadelphia, PA |
| 02/04/2015; 7:00 pm | | St. Bonaventure | L 61–62 | 14–6 (5–4) | John M. Belk Arena (4,264); Davidson, NC |
| 02/07/2015; 7:00 pm, TWCSC | | Duquesne | W 95–69 | 15–6 (6–4) | John M. Belk Arena (5,208); Davidson, NC |
| 02/11/2015; 7:00 pm, MI-Ch 4 | | George Mason | W 92–71 | 16–6 (7–4) | John M. Belk Arena (3,938); Davidson, NC |
| 02/14/2015; 2:00 pm | | at La Salle | W 77–69 | 17–6 (8–4) | Tom Gola Arena (2,738); Philadelphia, PA |
| 02/18/2015; 7:00 pm, TWCSC | | at George Washington | W 65–63 | 18–6 (9–4) | Charles E. Smith Center (3,012); Washington, D.C. |
| 02/21/2015; 7:00 pm, MI-Ch 4 | | Fordham | W 76–57 | 19–6 (10–4) | John M. Belk Arena (5,084); Davidson, NC |
| 02/25/2015; 7:00 pm | | at Rhode Island | W 60–59 | 20–6 (11–4) | Ryan Center (6,050); Kingston, RI |
| 02/28/2015; 7:00 pm, TWCSC | | George Washington | W 77–66 | 21–6 (12–4) | John M. Belk Arena (5,223); Davidson, NC |
| 03/05/2015; 9:00 pm, ESPNU | | VCU | W 82–55 | 22–6 (13–4) | John M. Belk Arena (5,223); Davidson, NC |
| 03/07/2015; 7:00 pm, ASN | | at Duquesne | W 107–78 | 23–6 (14–4) | Palumbo Center (2,830); Pittsburgh, PA |
Atlantic 10 tournament
| 03/13/2015; 12:00 pm, NBCSN | (1) No. 24 | vs. (9) La Salle; Quarterfinals | W 67–66 | 24–6 | Barclays Center (6,809); Brooklyn, NY |
| 03/14/2015; 1:30 pm, CBSSN | (1) No. 24 | vs. (5) VCU; Semifinals | L 73–93 | 24–7 | Barclays Center (8,488); Brooklyn, NY |
NCAA tournament
| 03/20/2015*; 7:20 pm, TNT | (10 S) | vs. (7 S) Iowa; Second round | L 52–83 | 24–8 | KeyArena (14,852); Seattle, WA |
*Non-conference game. ^{#}Rankings from AP Poll. (#) Tournament seedings in parentheses. S=South Region. All times are in Eastern Time.

== See also ==
- 2014–15 Davidson Wildcats women's basketball team
