= 2014–15 Richmond Spiders men's basketball team =

American college basketball season

2014–15 Richmond Spiders men's basketball

NIT, Quarterfinals
- Conference: Atlantic 10 Conference
- Record: 21–14 (12–6 A-10)
- Head coach: Chris Mooney (10th season)
- Assistant coaches: Jamal Brunt (8th season); Rob Jones (7th season); Kim Lewis (2nd season)
- Home arena: Robins Center

2014–15 Atlantic 10 men's basketball standings
	Conf.				Overall
Team	W		L	PCT	W		L	PCT
Davidson	14	–	4	.778	24	–	8	.750
Dayton	13	–	5	.722	27	–	9	.750
Rhode Island	13	–	5	.722	23	–	10	.697
VCU †	12	–	6	.667	26	–	10	.722
Richmond	12	–	6	.667	21	–	14	.600
George Washington	10	–	8	.556	22	–	13	.629
St. Bonaventure	10	–	8	.556	18	–	13	.581
UMass	10	–	8	.556	17	–	15	.531
La Salle	8	–	10	.444	17	–	16	.515
Saint Joseph's	7	–	11	.389	13	–	18	.419
Duquesne	6	–	12	.333	12	–	19	.387
Fordham	4	–	14	.222	10	–	21	.323
George Mason	4	–	14	.222	9	–	22	.290
Saint Louis	3	–	15	.167	11	–	21	.344
† 2015 A10 tournament winner Rankings from AP poll

The 2014–15 Richmond Spiders men's basketball team represented the University of Richmond during the 2014–15 NCAA Division I men's basketball season. Richmond competed as a member of the Atlantic 10 Conference (A-10) under tenth-year head coach Chris Mooney and played its home games at the Robins Center. They finished the season 21–14, 12–6 in A-10 play to finish in a tie for fourth place. They lost in the quarterfinals of the A-10 tournament to VCU. They were invited to the National Invitation Tournament where they defeated St. Francis Brooklyn in the first round and Arizona State in the second round to advance to the quarterfinals where they lost to Miami (FL).

== Previous season ==
The Spiders finished the season with an overall record of 19–14, with a record of 8–8 in the Atlantic 10 regular season to finish in seventh place. In the 2014 Atlantic 10 tournament the Spiders were defeated by VCU in the quarterfinals. Despite having 19 wins, they did not participate in a post season tournament.

== Off season ==
=== Departures ===
Name	Number	Pos.	Height	Weight	Year	Hometown	Notes
Cedrick Lindsay	2	G	6'1	190	Senior	Washington, D.C.	Graduated
Tim Singleton	10	G	6'2	180	Freshman	Dallas, Texas	Transferred
Wayne Sparrow	4	G	6'3	180	RS Junior	Baltimore, Maryland	Transferred
Derrick Williams	34	F	6'6"	270	Senior	Harlem, New York	Graduated

=== Recruiting ===
College recruiting information
Name	Hometown	School	Height	Weight	Commit date
Chandler Diekvoss; SF	De Pere, Wisconsin	De Pere HS	6 ft 6 in (1.98 m)	190 lb (86 kg)	Aug 5, 2013
Chandler Diekvoss; SF	Recruit ratings: No ratings found				
Khwan Fore; PG	Huntsville, Alabama	Lee HS	6 ft 2 in (1.88 m)	165 lb (75 kg)	Sep 10, 2013
Khwan Fore; PG	Recruit ratings: No ratings found				
Paul Friendshuh; PF	New Prague, Minnesota	New Prague HS	6 ft 9 in (2.06 m)	205 lb (93 kg)	Sep 18, 2013
Paul Friendshuh; PF	Recruit ratings: No ratings found				
Kadeem Smithen; PG	Toronto, Ontario, Canada	Thornlea Secondary	6 ft 3 in (1.91 m)	180 lb (82 kg)	Mar 3, 2014
Kadeem Smithen; PG	Recruit ratings: No ratings found				
Joe Kirby; SG	Weston, Florida	Sagemont School	6 ft 0 in (1.83 m)	190 lb (86 kg)	
Joe Kirby; SG	Recruit ratings: No ratings found				
Overall recruit ranking: Scout: NR Rivals: NR ESPN: NR
Note: In many cases, Scout, Rivals, 247Sports, On3, and ESPN may conflict in their listings of height and weight.; In these cases, the average was taken. ESPN grades are on a 100-point scale.; Sources: "Rivals.com 2014 Richmond Commitments". Rivals.; "Scout.com 2014 Richmond Commitments". Scout.; "ESPN 2014 Richmond Commitments". ESPN.; "Scout.com Team Recruiting Rankings". Scout.; "2014 Team Ranking". Rivals.

== Roster ==
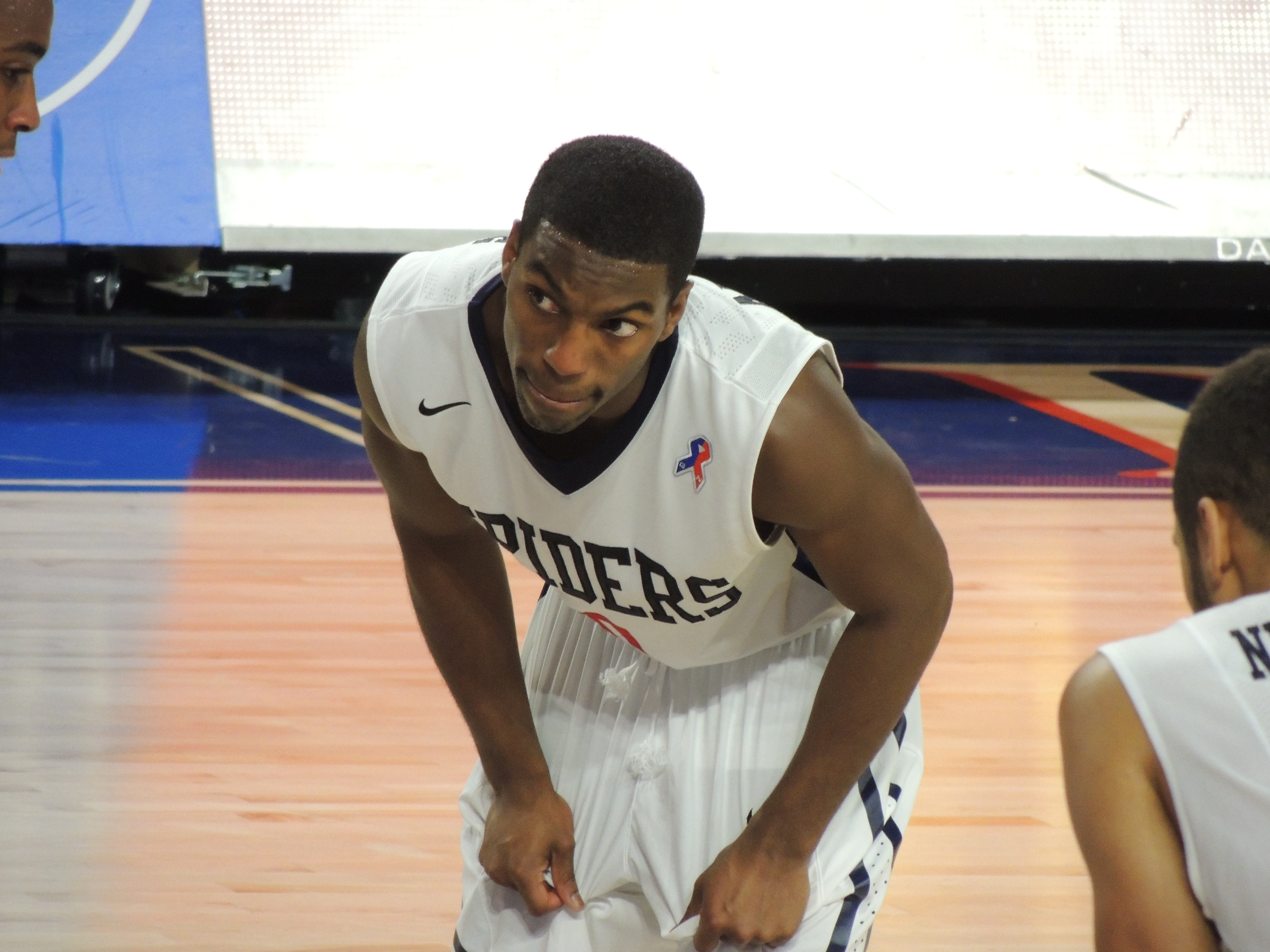
Senior point guard Kendall Anthony was named first-team All-Atlantic 10 and finished his career as the school's all-time leader in three-pointers.

2014–15 Richmond Spiders men's basketball team
Players
Coaches

Pos.	#	Name	Height	Weight	Year	Hometown
G	0	Kendall Anthony	5 ft 8 in (1.73 m)	150 lb (68 kg)	Sr	Jackson, Tennessee
G	1	Josh Jones	6 ft 4 in (1.93 m)	190 lb (86 kg)	So	Memphis, Tennessee
G	2	Khwan Fore	6 ft 2 in (1.88 m)	175 lb (79 kg)	Fr	Huntsville, Alabama
G	3	ShawnDre' Jones	5 ft 10 in (1.78 m)	160 lb (73 kg)	So	Houston, Texas
F	5	Trey Davis	6 ft 5 in (1.96 m)	215 lb (98 kg)	RS Jr	Richmond, Virginia
F	10	T. J. Cline	6 ft 9 in (2.06 m)	235 lb (107 kg)	RS So	Plano, Texas
F	11	Deion Taylor	6 ft 7 in (2.01 m)	210 lb (95 kg)	Jr	New Orleans, Louisiana
G	12	Kadeem Smithen	6 ft 3 in (1.91 m)	165 lb (75 kg)	Fr	Ajax, Ontario
G	13	John Moran (W)	6 ft 3 in (1.91 m)	185 lb (84 kg)	Jr	Phoenixville, Pennsylvania
F	15	Terry Allen	6 ft 8 in (2.03 m)	240 lb (109 kg)	Jr	Houston, Texas
F	22	Chandler Diekvoss (redshirt)	6 ft 6 in (1.98 m)	200 lb (91 kg)	Fr	De Pere, Wisconsin
F	24	Marshall Wood (redshirt)	6 ft 8 in (2.03 m)	220 lb (100 kg)	Jr	Rustburg, Virginia
G	25	Joe Kirby (W)	6 ft 1 in (1.85 m)	195 lb (88 kg)	Fr	Pembroke Pines, Florida
G	30	Zach Chu (W)	5 ft 10 in (1.78 m)	160 lb (73 kg)	Sr	Dallas, Texas
F	33	Alonzo Nelson-Ododa	6 ft 9 in (2.06 m)	235 lb (107 kg)	RS Jr	Atlanta, Georgia
F	44	Paul Friendshuh (redshirt)	6 ft 10 in (2.08 m)	225 lb (102 kg)	Fr	New Prague, Minnesota

Head coach

- Chris Mooney (Princeton)

Assistant coach(es)

- Jamal Brunt (Randolph-Macon)
- Tulane)

Legend

- (C) Team captain
- (S) Suspended
- (I) Ineligible
- (W) Walk-on
- Injured
- Current redshirt

Roster
Last update: 2014-10-28

== Schedule ==
Date time, TV	Rank^{#}	Opponent^{#}	Result	Record	Site (attendance) city, state
Non-conference regular season
November 14*; 7:30 pm, CBS6 Xtra		Radford	W 64–46	1–0	Robins Center (6,920); Richmond, Virginia
November 18*; 8:00 pm, ASN		at Old Dominion	L 57–63	1–1	Ted Constant Convocation Center (6,608); Norfolk, Virginia
November 22*; 1:00 pm, CSN+		High Point	W 80–56	2–1	Robins Center (5,877); Richmond, Virginia
November 26*; 7:00 pm, ESPN3		at NC State	L 72–84	2–2	PNC Arena (14,520); Raleigh, North Carolina
November 30*; 3:00 pm, CBS6 Xtra		at Northern Iowa	L 50–55	2–3	McLeod Center (3,081); Cedar Falls, Iowa
December 3*; 7:00 pm, CSN+		William & Mary	W 68–67	3–3	Robins Center (4,684); Richmond, Virginia
December 7*; 2:00 pm		at James Madison	L 46–51	3–4	JMU Convocation Center (3,537); Harrisonburg, Virginia
December 13*; 6:00 pm, CBS6 Xtra/CSN		Howard; Gotham Classic	W 54–41	4–4	Robins Center (5,489); Richmond, Virginia
December 18*; 7:00 pm		South Alabama; Gotham Classic	W 65–54	5–4	Robins Center (3,857); Richmond, Virginia
December 20*; 7:00 pm, ESPN3		vs. Pepperdine; Gotham Classic	W 65–63	6–4	Madison Square Garden (8,088); New York City, New York
December 23*; 12:00 pm		IUPUI; Gotham Classic	W 57–53	7–4	Robins Center (4,483); Richmond, Virginia
December 28*; 4:00 pm, NBCSN		Wake Forest	L 63–65	7–5	Robins Center (6,279); Richmond, Virginia
December 31*; 4:00 pm		Northeastern	L 57–58	7–6	Robins Center (4,179); Richmond, Virginia
Atlantic 10 regular season
January 3; 5:00 pm, NBCSN		at Davidson	L 67–81	7–7 (0–1)	John M. Belk Arena (4,919); Davidson, North Carolina
January 8; 7:00 pm, NBCSN		George Mason	W 75-65	8-7 (1–1)	Robins Center (4,395); Richmond, Virginia
January 11; 3:00 pm, CBS6 Xtra		St. Bonaventure	W 60–41	9–7 (2–1)	Robins Center (5,629); Richmond, Virginia
January 15; 7:00 pm, ESPNU		at George Washington	L 70–73 ^{2OT}	9–8 (2–2)	Charles E. Smith Center (3,621); Washington, D.C.
January 17; 6:00 pm, WTVR		Davidson	W 89–63	10–8 (3–2)	Robins Center (7,201); Richmond, Virginia
January 24; 7:00 pm, CSN		at No. 22 Dayton	L 60–63	10–9 (3–3)	UD Arena (13,455); Dayton, Ohio
January 28; 7:00 pm, CSN+		Duquesne	W 86–55	11–9 (4–3)	Robins Center (4,405); Richmond, Virginia
January 31; 2:00 pm, ESPN2		at No. 14 VCU; Capital City Classic	W 64–55	12–9 (5–3)	Siegel Center (7,637); Richmond, Virginia
February 5; 6:30 pm, NBCSN		at La Salle	L 62–64	12–10 (5–4)	Tom Gola Arena (2,011); Philadelphia, Pennsylvania
February 8; 2:30 pm, NBCSN		Rhode Island	L 74–79	12–11 (5–5)	Robins Center (7,201); Richmond, Virginia
February 11; 7:00 pm, CBS6 Xtra		Fordham	W 73–71	13–11 (6–5)	Robins Center (5,524); Richmond, Virginia
February 14; 4:00 pm, MASN		at George Mason	L 67–71	13–12 (6–6)	Patriot Center (6,018); Fairfax, Virginia
February 18; 7:00 pm		at St. Bonaventure	W 71–56	14–12 (7–6)	Reilly Center (3,319); Olean, New York
February 21; 4:00 pm, CBSSN		George Washington	W 56–48	15–12 (8–6)	Robins Center (7,201); Richmond, Virginia
February 25; 7:00 pm, ESPN2		No. 22 VCU; Capital City Classic	W 67–63 ^{2OT}	16–12 (9–6)	Robins Center (7,201); Richmond, Virginia
February 28; 7:00 pm, CSN		at Saint Joseph's	W 63–57	17–12 (10–6)	Hagan Arena (3,876); Philadelphia, Pennsylvania
March 4; 7:00 pm, ASN		at Massachusetts	W 56–53	18–12 (11–6)	Mullins Center (3,857); Amherst, Massachusetts
March 7; 8:00 pm		Saint Louis	W 67–51	19–12 (12–6)	Robins Center (7,201); Richmond, Virginia
Atlantic 10 tournament
March 13; 2:30 pm, NBCSN		vs. VCU; Quarterfinals	L 67–70	19–13	Barclays Center (6,809); Brooklyn, New York
National Invitation tournament
March 18*; 7:30 pm, ESPN3	(1)	(8) St. Francis Brooklyn; First round	W 84–74	20–13	Robins Center (3,624); Richmond, Virginia
March 22*; 7:30 pm, ESPNU	(1)	(5) Arizona State; Second round	W 76–70 ^{OT}	21–13	Robins Center (4,507); Richmond, Virginia
March 24*; 7:00 pm, ESPN	(1)	(2) Miami (FL); Quarterfinals	L 61–63	21–14	Robins Center (6,126); Richmond, Virginia
*Non-conference game. ^{#}Rankings from AP Poll. (#) Tournament seedings in parentheses. All times are in Eastern Time. (#) during NIT is seed within region.
