= 2014–15 Duquesne Dukes men's basketball team =

American college basketball season

2014–15 Duquesne Dukes men's basketball
- Conference: Atlantic 10 Conference
- Record: 12–19 (6–12 A-10)
- Head coach: Jim Ferry (3rd season)
- Assistant coaches: Brian Nash; John Rhodes; Rich Glesmann
- Home arena: A. J. Palumbo Center (Capacity: 4,406)

2014–15 Atlantic 10 men's basketball standings
	Conf.				Overall
Team	W		L	PCT	W		L	PCT
Davidson	14	–	4	.778	24	–	8	.750
Dayton	13	–	5	.722	27	–	9	.750
Rhode Island	13	–	5	.722	23	–	10	.697
VCU †	12	–	6	.667	26	–	10	.722
Richmond	12	–	6	.667	21	–	14	.600
George Washington	10	–	8	.556	22	–	13	.629
St. Bonaventure	10	–	8	.556	18	–	13	.581
UMass	10	–	8	.556	17	–	15	.531
La Salle	8	–	10	.444	17	–	16	.515
Saint Joseph's	7	–	11	.389	13	–	18	.419
Duquesne	6	–	12	.333	12	–	19	.387
Fordham	4	–	14	.222	10	–	21	.323
George Mason	4	–	14	.222	9	–	22	.290
Saint Louis	3	–	15	.167	11	–	21	.344
† 2015 A10 tournament winner Rankings from AP poll

The 2014–15 Duquesne Dukes men's basketball team represented Duquesne University during the 2014–15 NCAA Division I men's basketball season. The Dukes, led by third-year head coach Jim Ferry, played their home games at the A. J. Palumbo Center and were members of the Atlantic 10 Conference (A-10). They finished the season 12–19, 6–12 in A-10 play, to finish in eleventh place. They advanced to the second round of the A-10 tournament where they lost to George Washington.

== Previous season ==
The 2013–14 Duquesne Dukes finished the season with an overall record of 13–17, with a record of 5–11 in the Atlantic 10 regular season in a tie for tenth place. In the 2014 Atlantic 10 tournament, the Dukes were defeated by Richmond in the second round.

== Off-season ==
=== Departures ===
Name	Number	Pos.	Height	Weight	Year	Hometown	Notes
Ovie Soko	0	F	6'8"	225	RS Senior	London, England	Graduated
Tra'Vaughn White	2	G	5'10"	190	Junior	Kansas City, MO	Transferred to Longwood
Jerry Jones	5	G/F	6'4"	195	Senior	Detroit, MI	Graduated
Isaiah Watkins	13	F	6'7"	220	Freshman	Toronto, ON	Transferred to Furman

=== Incoming transfers ===
Name	Number	Pos.	Height	Weight	Year	Hometown	Previous school
Jordan Stevens	35	G	6'1"	180	Junior	Columbia, MO	Southeastern Community College
Rene Castro		G	6'2"	175	Sophomore	Boston, MA	Transferred from Butler. Under NCAA transfer rules, Castro will have to redshirt from the 2014–15 season. Will have three years of remaining eligibility.

== Incoming recruits ==
College recruiting information
Name	Hometown	School	Height	Weight	Commit date
Tysean Powell; PF	Cleveland, OH	IMG Academy	6 ft 7 in (2.01 m)	190 lb (86 kg)	Feb 23, 2014
Tysean Powell; PF	Recruit ratings: Scout: Rivals: (N/A)				
Eric James; SG	Westerville, OH	Westerville High School	6 ft 5 in (1.96 m)	175 lb (79 kg)	Sep 27, 2013
Eric James; SG	Recruit ratings: Scout: Rivals: (N/A)				
Overall recruit ranking:
Note: In many cases, Scout, Rivals, 247Sports, On3, and ESPN may conflict in their listings of height and weight.; In these cases, the average was taken. ESPN grades are on a 100-point scale.; Sources: "2014 Team Ranking". Rivals.

== Roster ==
2014–15 Duquesne Dukes men's basketball team
Players
Coaches

Pos.	#	Name	Height	Weight	Year	Previous school	Hometown
G	1	Derrick Colter	5 ft 11 in (1.8 m)	180 lb (82 kg)	Jr	Largo	Forestville, MD
G	2	Eric James	6 ft 5 in (1.96 m)	205 lb (93 kg)	Fr	Westerville	Westerville, OH
F	3	Dominique McKoy	6 ft 8 in (2.03 m)	215 lb (98 kg)	Sr	Cowley County CC; South Atlanta	Atlanta, GA
F	5	TySean Powell	6 ft 6 in (1.98 m)	215 lb (98 kg)	Fr	IMG Academy	Twinsburg, OH
G	14	Christian Johnston	5 ft 10 in (1.78 m)	150 lb (68 kg)	Jr	Shaler	Pittsburgh, PA
G	21	Brandon Cartmill	5 ft 10 in (1.78 m)	170 lb (77 kg)	Jr	Cumberland Valley	Carlisle, PA
G	22	Micah Mason	6 ft 2 in (1.88 m)	180 lb (82 kg)	Jr	Drake; Highlands	Natrona Heights, PA
G	23	Jeremiah Jones	6 ft 3 in (1.91 m)	190 lb (86 kg)	Jr	Merrillville	Gary, IN
G	32	Desmond Ridenour	6 ft 2 in (1.88 m)	185 lb (84 kg)	So	Benedictine	Cleveland Heights, OH
F	33	L.G. Gill	6 ft 7 in (2.01 m)	210 lb (95 kg)	So	Benedictine College Prep	Chesterfield, VA
G	35	Jordan Stevens	6 ft 0 in (1.83 m)	190 lb (86 kg)	Jr	Southeastern CC	Columbia, MO
F	44	Nick Foschia	6 ft 4 in (1.93 m)	215 lb (98 kg)	Jr	Walsh Jesuit	Northfield Center, OH
C	54	Darius Lewis	6 ft 11 in (2.11 m)	255 lb (116 kg)	So	IMG Academy	Lexington, KY
F	55	Jordan Robinson	6 ft 8 in (2.03 m)	255 lb (116 kg)	RS Fr	Quality Education Academy	Toronto, ON
G		Rene Castro (redshirt)	6 ft 2 in (1.88 m)	180 lb (82 kg)	So	Butler; Worcester Academy	Boston, MA
G		Mar'Qywell Jackson (redshirt)	6 ft 5 in (1.96 m)	185 lb (84 kg)	Fr	UTEP; East English Valley Prep	Detroit, MI

Head coach

- Jim Ferry (Keene State)

Assistant coach(es)

- Brian Nash (Keene State)
- John Rhodes (Ohio)
- Rich Glesmann (Emerson)

Legend

- (C) Team captain
- (S) Suspended
- (I) Ineligible
- (W) Walk-on
- Injured
- Current redshirt

Roster

== Schedule ==
Date time, TV	Rank^{#}	Opponent^{#}	Result	Record	Site (attendance) city, state
Exhibition
11/07/2014*; 7:00 pm		Shippensburg	W 72–69		Palumbo Center (1,727); Pittsburgh, PA
Non-conference regular season
11/15/2014*; 2:00 pm		Bluefield State	W 91–51	1–0	Palumbo Center (2,397); Pittsburgh, PA
11/22/2014*; 5:00 pm		at Abilene Christian	W 102–81	2–0	Moody Coliseum (N/A); Abilene, TX
11/29/2014*; 2:00 pm		NJIT	L 81–84	2–1	Palumbo Center (1,563); Pittsburgh, PA
12/02/2014*; 7:00 pm		Howard	W 81–63	3–1	Palumbo Center (1,337); Pittsburgh, PA
12/05/2014*; 7:00 pm, ESPN3		vs. Pittsburgh; City Game	L 62–76	3–2	Consol Energy Center (14,905); Pittsburgh, PA
12/10/2014*; 9:00 pm, BTN		at Penn State	L 62–64	3–3	Bryce Jordan Center (6,565); University Park, PA
12/13/2014*; 4:00 pm		at Robert Morris	L 59–75	3–4	Charles L. Sewall Center (2,024); Moon Township, PA
12/17/2014*; 7:00 pm		Saint Francis	L 52–67	3–5	Palumbo Center (1,398); Pittsburgh, PA
12/20/2014*; 1:00 pm		UMass Lowell	W 79–63	4–5	Palumbo Center (1,424); Pittsburgh, PA
12/28/2014*; 2:00 pm		Maryland Eastern Shore	L 69–78	4–6	Palumbo Center (1,459); Pittsburgh, PA
12/30/2014*; 7:00 pm		Texas–Pan American	W 78–72	5–6	Palumbo Center (1,322); Pittsburgh, PA
Atlantic 10 regular season
01/03/2015; 1:00 pm, NBCSN		at Dayton	L 55–81	5–7 (0–1)	UD Arena (12,319); Dayton, OH
01/07/2015; 7:00 pm		Saint Joseph's	W 71–68	6–7 (1–1)	Palumbo Center (1,678); Pittsburgh, PA
01/10/2015; 1:00 pm, ASN		Rhode Island	L 60–61	6–8 (1–2)	Palumbo Center (2,309); Pittsburgh, PA
01/14/2015; 8:00 pm		at Saint Louis	L 69–78	6–9 (1–3)	Chaifetz Arena (6,530); St. Louis, MO
01/17/2015; 2:00 pm, CBSSN		No. 17 VCU	L 64–70	6–10 (1–4)	Consol Energy Center (4,223); Pittsburgh, PA
01/22/2015; 7:00 pm		St. Bonaventure	L 97–100	6–11 (1–6)	Palumbo Center (2,257); Pittsburgh, PA
01/24/2015; 2:00 pm		at George Washington	L 59–74	6–12 (1–6)	Charles E. Smith Center (4,697); Washington, D.C.
01/28/2015; 7:00 pm		at Richmond	L 55–86	6–13 (1–7)	Robins Center (4,405); Richmond, VA
01/31/2015; 7:00 pm		George Mason	W 62–53	7–13 (2–7)	Palumbo Center (3,012); Pittsburgh, PA
02/07/2015; 7:00 pm		at Davidson	L 69–95	7–14 (2–8)	John M. Belk Arena (5,208); Davidson, NC
02/11/2015; 7:00 pm		George Washington	W 78–62	8–14 (3–8)	Palumbo Center (1,883); Pittsburgh, PA
02/14/2015; 4:00 pm		at Massachusetts	L 74–82	8–15 (3–9)	Mullins Center (4,437); Amherst, MA
02/18/2015; 7:00 pm, ASN		at La Salle	L 72–87	8–16 (3–10)	Tom Gola Arena (1,721); Philadelphia, PA
02/21/2015; 2:00 pm, NBCSN		Dayton	W 83–73	9–16 (4–10)	Consol Energy Center (5,227); Pittsburgh, PA
02/25/2015; 7:00 pm		Saint Louis	W 79–66	10–16 (5–10)	Palumbo Center (2,008); Pittsburgh, PA
02/28/2015; 4:00 pm		at St. Bonaventure	L 75–92	10–17 (5–11)	Reilly Center (4,671); Olean, NY
03/04/2015; 7:00 pm		at Fordham	W 81–66	11–17 (6–11)	Rose Hill Gymnasium (1,652); The Bronx, NY
03/07/2015; 7:00 pm, ASN		Davidson	L 78–107	11–18 (6–12)	Palumbo Center (2,830); Pittsburgh, PA
Atlantic 10 tournament
03/11/2015; 9:00 pm		vs. Saint Louis; First round	W 61–55	12–18	Barclays Center (N/A); Brooklyn, NY
03/12/2015; 9:00 pm, NBCSN		vs. George Washington; Second round	L 55–73	12–19	Barclays Center (6,223); Brooklyn, NY
*Non-conference game. ^{#}Rankings from AP poll. (#) Tournament seedings in parentheses. All times are in Eastern Time.

== See also ==
2014–15 Duquesne Dukes women's basketball team
