= 2014–15 Saint Joseph's Hawks men's basketball team =

American college basketball season

2014–15 Saint Joseph's Hawks men's basketball
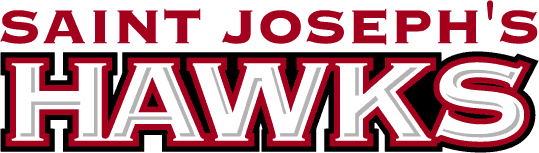
- Conference: Atlantic 10 Conference
- Record: 13–18 (7–11 A-10)
- Head coach: Phil Martelli (20th season)
- Assistant coaches: Mark Bass; David Duda; Geoff Arnold
- Home arena: Hagan Arena

2014–15 Atlantic 10 men's basketball standings
	Conf.				Overall
Team	W		L	PCT	W		L	PCT
Davidson	14	–	4	.778	24	–	8	.750
Dayton	13	–	5	.722	27	–	9	.750
Rhode Island	13	–	5	.722	23	–	10	.697
VCU †	12	–	6	.667	26	–	10	.722
Richmond	12	–	6	.667	21	–	14	.600
George Washington	10	–	8	.556	22	–	13	.629
St. Bonaventure	10	–	8	.556	18	–	13	.581
UMass	10	–	8	.556	17	–	15	.531
La Salle	8	–	10	.444	17	–	16	.515
Saint Joseph's	7	–	11	.389	13	–	18	.419
Duquesne	6	–	12	.333	12	–	19	.387
Fordham	4	–	14	.222	10	–	21	.323
George Mason	4	–	14	.222	9	–	22	.290
Saint Louis	3	–	15	.167	11	–	21	.344
† 2015 A10 tournament winner Rankings from AP poll

The 2014–15 Saint Joseph's Hawks basketball team represented Saint Joseph's University during the 2014–15 NCAA Division I men's basketball season. The Hawks, led by 20th year head coach Phil Martelli, played their home games at Hagan Arena and were members of the Atlantic 10 Conference. They finished the season 13–18, 7–11 in A-10 play to finish in tenth place. They lost in the second round of the A-10 tournament to St. Bonaventure.

== Previous season ==
The Hawks finished the season with an overall record of 24–10, with a record of 11–5 in the Atlantic 10 regular season to finish in a tie for third place. They were champions of the A-10 tournament to earn the conferences automatic bid to the NCAA tournament where they lost in the second round to Connecticut.

== Off season ==
=== Departures ===
Name	Number	Pos.	Height	Weight	Year	Hometown	Notes
Langston Galloway	10	G	6'3"	202	Senior	Baton Rouge, LA	Graduated; currently playing for the New York Knicks
Daryus Quarles	11	F	6'6"	186	Senior	Paulsboro, NJ	Graduated
Ronald Roberts Jr.	13	F	6'8"	225	Senior	Bayonne, NJ	Graduated; signed to play professionally by Philadelphia 76ers
Colin Kelly	41	F	6'5"	210	Senior	West Deptford Twp, NJ	Graduated
Halil Kanacevic	45	F	6'8"	255	Senior	Staten Island, NY	Graduated; signed to play professionally in Italy

== Incoming recruits ==
College recruiting information
Name	Hometown	School	Height	Weight	Commit date
James Demery; SF	Greenville, NC	Northside Christian Academy	6 ft 6 in (1.98 m)	197 lb (89 kg)	Sep 30, 2013
James Demery; SF	Recruit ratings: Scout: Rivals: 247Sports: ESPN: (78)				
Shavar Newkirk; PG	Bronx, NY	Cardinal Hayes High School	5 ft 11 in (1.80 m)	170 lb (77 kg)	Jul 26, 2013
Shavar Newkirk; PG	Recruit ratings: Scout: Rivals: 247Sports: ESPN: (73)				
Obi Romeo; PF	Lewisburg, WV	Greenbrier East High School	6 ft 9 in (2.06 m)	215 lb (98 kg)	Sep 11, 2013
Obi Romeo; PF	Recruit ratings: ESPN: (71)				
Markell Lodge; PF	Creedmoor, NC	Christian Faith Center Academy	6 ft 6 in (1.98 m)	190 lb (86 kg)	Sep 25, 2013
Markell Lodge; PF	Recruit ratings: Scout: Rivals: 247Sports: ESPN: (70)				
Overall recruit ranking:
Note: In many cases, Scout, Rivals, 247Sports, On3, and ESPN may conflict in their listings of height and weight.; In these cases, the average was taken. ESPN grades are on a 100-point scale.; Sources: "Saint Joseph's Hawks". ESPN.; "2014 Team Ranking". Rivals.

== Roster ==
2014–15 Saint Joseph's Hawks men's basketball team
Players
Coaches

Pos.	#	Name	Height	Weight	Year	Previous school	Hometown
G	0	Evan Maschemeyer	6 ft 3 in (1.91 m)	200 lb (91 kg)	Sr	Jeffersonville	Jeffersonville, IN
G	1	Shavar Newkirk	6 ft 0 in (1.83 m)	164 lb (74 kg)	Fr	Cardinal Hayes	Bronx, NY
G	2	Aaron Brown	6 ft 5 in (1.96 m)	220 lb (100 kg)	RS Jr	Penn Wood; West Virginia	Darby, PA
G	3	Mike Booth (W)	6 ft 3 in (1.91 m)	193 lb (88 kg)	Fr	Bishop Shanahan	Thornton, PA
F	5	Obi Romeo	6 ft 10 in (2.08 m)	231 lb (105 kg)	Fr	Greenbrier East	Lewisburg, WV
F	12	Papa Ndao (injured)	6 ft 8 in (2.03 m)	225 lb (102 kg)	Sr	Montverde Acad.	Dakar, Senegal
F	15	Isaiah Miles	6 ft 7 in (2.01 m)	223 lb (101 kg)	Jr	Milford Mill	Baltimore, MD
F	20	Brendan Casper	6 ft 6 in (1.98 m)	215 lb (98 kg)	So	Methacton	Audubon, PA
G	21	Kyle Thompson (W)	6 ft 2 in (1.88 m)	191 lb (87 kg)	Fr	St. Joseph's Prep	Mt. Laurel, NJ
G	22	Kyle Molock	6 ft 2 in (1.88 m)	192 lb (87 kg)	RS So	Dublin Coffman	Dublin, OH
F	23	Markell Lodge	6 ft 7 in (2.01 m)	195 lb (88 kg)	Fr	Christian Faith Center Academy	Creedmoor, NC
G	24	Chris Wilson (C)	6 ft 3 in (1.91 m)	210 lb (95 kg)	Sr	Terry Sanford	Fayetteville, NC
F	25	James Demery	6 ft 6 in (1.98 m)	188 lb (85 kg)	Fr	Northside Christian	Greenville, NC
C	34	Javon Baumann	6 ft 8 in (2.03 m)	257 lb (117 kg)	RS So	Theodor-Heus School	Solms-Oberbiel, Germany
F	40	Jai Williams	6 ft 9 in (2.06 m)	267 lb (121 kg)	RS Fr	Philadelphia Electrical & Technical Charter	Philadelphia, PA
F	43	DeAndre' Bembry (C)	6 ft 6 in (1.98 m)	200 lb (91 kg)	So	The Patrick School	Charlotte, NC

Head coach

- Phil Martelli (Widener)

Assistant coach(es)

- Mark Bass (Saint Joseph's)
- David Duda (Spring Garden)
- Geoff Arnold (Saint Joseph's)

Legend

- (C) Team captain
- (S) Suspended
- (I) Ineligible
- (W) Walk-on
- Injured
- Current redshirt

Roster

== Schedule ==
Date time, TV	Rank^{#}	Opponent^{#}	Result	Record	Site (attendance) city, state
Non-conference regular season
11/14/2014*; 7:00 pm		Fairleigh Dickinson	L 57–58	0–1	Hagan Arena (4,200); Philadelphia, PA
11/17/2014*; 7:00 pm		at Drexel	W 52–49	1–1	Daskalakis Athletic Center (2,509); Philadelphia, PA
11/19/2014*; 11:00 pm, ESPNU		at No. 13 Gonzaga; NIT Season Tip-Off Opening Round	L 42–94	1–2	McCarthey Athletic Center (6,000); Spokane, WA
11/22/2014*; 7:00 pm		Vermont	W 68–60	2–2	Hagan Arena (3,851); Philadelphia, PA
11/25/2014*; 7:00 pm		LIU Brooklyn; NIT Season Tip-Off Opening Round	W 74–70 ^{OT}	3–2	Hagan Arena (3,243); Philadelphia, PA
11/27/2014*; 6:00 pm, ESPNU		vs. WKU; NIT Season Tip-Off	L 59–62	3–3	Madison Square Garden (1,266); New York City, NY
12/03/2014*; 6:30 pm, CBSSN		Temple; Rivalry	W 58–56	4–3	Hagan Arena (4,200); Philadelphia, PA
12/06/2014*; 1:00 pm, FS1		at No. 10 Villanova; Holy War	L 46–74	4–4	The Pavilion (6,500); Villanova, PA
12/09/2014*; 7:00 pm		Loyola (MD)	W 68–42	5–4	Hagan Arena (3,743); Philadelphia, PA
12/20/2014*; 7:00 pm		at Marist	W 75–58	6–4	McCann Field House (1,158); Poughkeepsie, NY
12/29/2014*; 9:00 pm		at Denver	L 73–77 ^{OT}	6–5	Magness Arena (1,437); Denver, CO
Atlantic 10 regular season
01/03/2015; 2:00 pm, CBSSN		George Washington	L 60–64	6–6 (0–1)	Hagan Arena (4,200); Philadelphia, PA
01/07/2015; 7:00 pm		at Duquesne	L 68–71	6–7 (0–2)	Palumbo Center (1,678); Pittsburgh, PA
01/10/2015; 2:00 pm, CBSSN		at No. 20 VCU	L 74–89	6–8 (0–3)	Siegel Center (7,637); Richmond, VA
01/14/2015; 7:00 pm		Fordham	W 66–55	7–8 (1–3)	Hagan Arena (3,851); Philadelphia, PA
01/18/2015; 2:30 pm, NBCSN		at St. Bonaventure	L 61–70	7–9 (1–4)	Reilly Center (4,244); Olean, NY
01/21/2015; 7:00 pm, CBSSN		Massachusetts	W 62–56	8–9 (2–4)	Hagan Arena (3,687); Philadelphia, PA
01/24/2015*; 7:00 pm		at Penn	L 52–56	8–10	Palestra (8,538); Philadelphia, PA
01/27/2015; 7:00 pm, CSN		at La Salle	L 48–53	8–11 (2–5)	Tom Gola Arena (2,449); Philadelphia, PA
01/31/2015; 12:30 pm, NBCSN		Davidson	W 75–70	9–11 (3–5)	Hagan Arena (3,951); Philadelphia, PA
02/03/2015; 7:30 pm, CBSSN		at Saint Louis	L 61–68 ^{OT}	9–12 (3–6)	Chaifetz Arena (6,953); St. Louis, MO
02/07/2015; 4:00 pm		George Mason	W 58–54	10–12 (4–6)	Hagan Arena (4,200); Philadelphia, PA
02/11/2015; 7:00 pm		Rhode Island	W 65–64	11–12 (5–6)	Patriot Center (3,681); Philadelphia, PA
02/15/2015; 2:30 pm, NBCSN		at Fordham	L 55–69	11–13 (5–7)	Rose Hill Gymnasium (2,885); Bronx, NY
02/19/2015; 6:00 pm, ESPNU		at Dayton	L 64–68	11–14 (5–8)	UD Arena (13,015); Dayton, OH
02/21/2015; 7:00 pm, CSN		St. Bonaventure	L 60–70 ^{OT}	11–15 (5–9)	Hagan Arena (2,482); Philadelphia, PA
02/25/2015; 7:00 pm, CSN		at Massachusetts	W 82–71	12–15 (6–9)	Mullins Center (3,234); Amherst, MA
02/28/2015; 7:00 pm, CSN		Richmond	L 57–63	12–16 (6–10)	Hagan Arena (3,876); Philadelphia, PA
03/04/2015; 7:00 pm, CBSSN		La Salle	W 55–50	13–16 (7–10)	Hagan Arena (3,743); Philadelphia, PA
03/07/2015; 2:00 pm, OSN		at Rhode Island	L 68–78	13–17 (7–11)	Ryan Center (7,121); Kingston, RI
Atlantic 10 tournament
03/12/2015; 6:30 pm, NBCSN		vs. St. Bonaventure; Second Round	L 49–60	13–18	Barclays Center; Brooklyn, NY
*Non-conference game. ^{#}Rankings from AP Poll. (#) Tournament seedings in parentheses. All times are in Eastern Time.
