= 2014–15 La Salle Explorers men's basketball team =

American college basketball season

2014–15 La Salle Explorers men's basketball
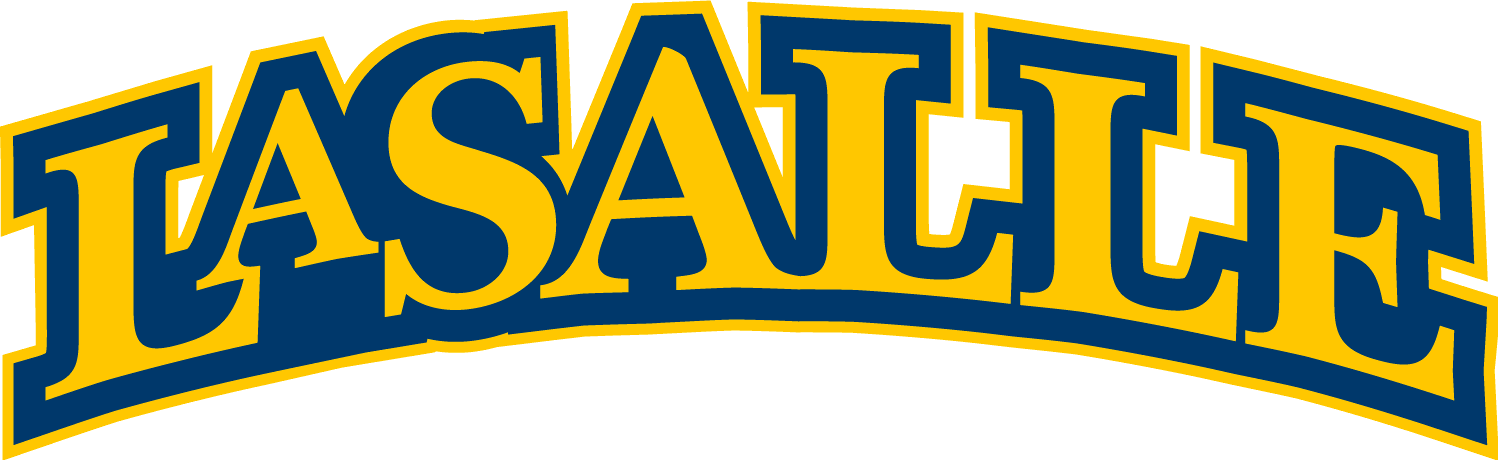
- Conference: Atlantic 10 Conference
- Record: 17–16 (8–10 A-10)
- Head coach: John Giannini (11th season)
- Assistant coaches: Horace Owens; Harris Adler; Will Bailey
- Home arena: Tom Gola Arena

2014–15 Atlantic 10 men's basketball standings
	Conf.				Overall
Team	W		L	PCT	W		L	PCT
Davidson	14	–	4	.778	24	–	8	.750
Dayton	13	–	5	.722	27	–	9	.750
Rhode Island	13	–	5	.722	23	–	10	.697
VCU †	12	–	6	.667	26	–	10	.722
Richmond	12	–	6	.667	21	–	14	.600
George Washington	10	–	8	.556	22	–	13	.629
St. Bonaventure	10	–	8	.556	18	–	13	.581
UMass	10	–	8	.556	17	–	15	.531
La Salle	8	–	10	.444	17	–	16	.515
Saint Joseph's	7	–	11	.389	13	–	18	.419
Duquesne	6	–	12	.333	12	–	19	.387
Fordham	4	–	14	.222	10	–	21	.323
George Mason	4	–	14	.222	9	–	22	.290
Saint Louis	3	–	15	.167	11	–	21	.344
† 2015 A10 tournament winner Rankings from AP poll

The 2014–15 La Salle Explorers basketball team represented La Salle University during the 2014–15 NCAA Division I men's basketball season. The Explorers, led by eleventh year head coach John Giannini, played their home games at Tom Gola Arena and were members of the Atlantic 10 Conference. They finished the season 17–16, 8–10 in A-10 play to finish in ninth place. They advanced to the quarterfinals of the A-10 tournament where they lost to Davidson.

== Previous season ==
The Explorers finished the season with an overall record of 15–16, with a record of 7–9 in the Atlantic 10 regular season to finish in eighth place. In the 2014 Atlantic 10 tournament the Explorers lost to St. Bonaventure in the second round.

== Off season ==
=== Departures ===
Name	Number	Pos.	Height	Weight	Year	Hometown	Notes
Tyreek Duren	3	G	6'0"	190	Senior	Philadelphia, PA	Graduated
Taylor Dunn	5	G	6'2"	205	RS Senior	State College, PA	Graduated
Sam Mills	10	G	6'2"	200	Senior	Sunrise, FL	Graduated
Tyrone Garland	21	G	6'1"	185	Senior	Philadelphia, PA	Graduated

=== Recruiting ===
College recruiting information
Name	Hometown	School	Height	Weight	Commit date
Johnnie Shuler; PG	Washington, D.C.	Roosevelt HS	5 ft 11 in (1.80 m)	165 lb (75 kg)	Nov 5, 2013
Johnnie Shuler; PG	Recruit ratings: (69)				
Overall recruit ranking:
Note: In many cases, Scout, Rivals, 247Sports, On3, and ESPN may conflict in their listings of height and weight.; In these cases, the average was taken. ESPN grades are on a 100-point scale.; Sources: "2014 Team Ranking". Rivals.

== Roster ==
2014–15 La Salle Explorers men's basketball team
Players
Coaches

Pos.	#	Name	Height	Weight	Year	Hometown
C	0	Stephen Zack	6 ft 11 in (2.11 m)	240 lb (109 kg)	Sr	New Cumberland, PA
G	1	D. J. Peterson	6 ft 6 in (1.98 m)	195 lb (88 kg)	Sr	Burnsville, MN
G	2	Amar Stukes	6 ft 2 in (1.88 m)	180 lb (82 kg)	RS Fr	Philadelphia, PA
G	3	Cleon Roberts	6 ft 5 in (1.96 m)	175 lb (79 kg)	RS So	Miami, FL
G	4	Hank Davis (W)	5 ft 11 in (1.8 m)	160 lb (73 kg)	So	Cherry Hill, NJ
F/C	5	Tony Washington	6 ft 10 in (2.08 m)	210 lb (95 kg)	RS Fr	Detroit, MI
G	10	Johnnie Shuler	5 ft 11 in (1.8 m)	170 lb (77 kg)	Fr	Washington, D.C.
G	11	O. J. Lewis	6 ft 0 in (1.83 m)	175 lb (79 kg)	Jr	Mitchellville, MD
F	12	Yevgen Sakhniuk	6 ft 7 in (2.01 m)	225 lb (102 kg)	Fr	Kyiv, Ukraine
G	21	Jordan Price	6 ft 5 in (1.96 m)	220 lb (100 kg)	RS So	Decatur, GA
G	23	Khalid Lewis	6 ft 3 in (1.91 m)	185 lb (84 kg)	RS Jr	Trenton, NJ
F	25	Jerrell Wright	6 ft 8 in (2.03 m)	245 lb (111 kg)	Sr	Philadelphia, PA
C	30	Jermaine Davis	6 ft 9 in (2.06 m)	295 lb (134 kg)	RS So	Garfield Heights, OH
G/F	35	Rohan Brown	6 ft 6 in (1.98 m)	210 lb (95 kg)	RS Jr	Hartford, CT

Head coach

- John Giannini (North Central (IL))

Assistant coach(es)

- Horace Owens (Rhode Island)
- Harris Adler (USciences)
- Will Bailey (UAB)

Legend

- (C) Team captain
- (S) Suspended
- (I) Ineligible
- (W) Walk-on
- Injured
- Current redshirt

== Schedule ==
Date time, TV	Rank^{#}	Opponent^{#}	Result	Record	Site (attendance) city, state
Exhibition
11/10/2014*; 7:00 pm		Philadelphia	W 79–61		Tom Gola Arena; Philadelphia, PA
Non-conference regular season
11/15/2014*; 3:00 pm		Colgate	W 57–52	1–0	Tom Gola Arena (3,400); Philadelphia, PA
11/18/2014*; 7:30 pm		at Quinnipiac	W 60–58	2–0	TD Bank Sports Center (1,362); Hamden, CT
11/22/2014*; 12:30 pm		Saint Peter's; Barclays Center Classic	W 59–50	3–0	Tom Gola Arena (1,607); Philadelphia, PA
11/25/2014*; 7:00 pm		St. Francis Brooklyn; Barclays Center Classic	W 73–60	4–0	Tom Gola Arena (1,239); Philadelphia, PA
11/28/2014*; 9:30 pm, NBCSN		vs. No. 8 Virginia; Barclays Center Classic semifinals	L 56–64	4–1	Barclays Center (4,118); Brooklyn, NY
11/29/2014*; 7:00 pm, NBCSN		vs. Vanderbilt; Barclays Center Classic	L 55–68	4–2	Barclays Center (4,105); Brooklyn, NY
12/03/2014*; 8:30 pm, CBSSN		No. 10 Villanova	L 70–84	4–3	Tom Gola Arena (3,400); Philadelphia, PA
12/06/2014*; 12:00 pm, ESPNews		vs. Temple	L 57–58	4–4	Palestra (7,445); Philadelphia, PA
12/13/2014*; 1:00 pm		at Drexel	W 65–55	5–4	Daskalakis Athletic Center (1,613); Philadelphia, PA
12/16/2014*; 7:00 pm		American	L 66–68 ^{OT}	5–5	Tom Gola Arena (1,204); Philadelphia, PA
12/20/2014*; 7:00 pm		at Towson	W 67–53	6–5	SECU Arena (2,104); Towson, MD
12/23/2014*; 4:00 pm		at Hofstra	W 83–74	7–5	Mack Sports Complex (1,184); Hempstead, NY
12/30/2014*; 7:00 pm		Penn	W 84–67	8–5	Tom Gola Arena (2,273); Philadelphia, PA
Atlantic 10 regular season
01/03/2015; 7:00 pm		at George Mason	L 62–70	8–6 (0–1)	Patriot Center (3,376); Fairfax, VA
01/07/2015; 7:00 pm		Massachusetts	L 65–71	8–7 (0–2)	Tom Gola Arena (1,379); Philadelphia, PA
01/10/2015; 12:30 pm, NBCSN		George Washington	W 63–50	9–7 (1–2)	Tom Gola Arena (2,041); Philadelphia, PA
01/14/2015; 7:00 pm		at Dayton	L 50–61	9–8 (1–3)	UD Arena (12,300); Dayton, OH
01/17/2015; 2:00 pm		Fordham	W 60–49	10–8 (2–3)	Tom Gola Arena (2,311); Philadelphia, PA
01/22/2015; 7:00 pm, CSN		at Rhode Island	L 47–59	10–9 (2–4)	Ryan Center (4,481); Kingston, RI
01/27/2015; 7:00 pm		Saint Joseph's	W 53–48	11–9 (3–4)	Tom Gola Arena (2,449); Philadelphia, PA
01/31/2015; 7:00 pm		at St. Bonaventure	W 66–56	12–9 (4–4)	Reilly Center (4,769); Olean, NY
02/05/2015; 6:30 pm, NBCSN		Richmond	W 64–62	13–9 (5–4)	Tom Gola Arena (2,011); Philadelphia, PA
02/08/2015; 4:00 pm, CBSSN		at Massachusetts	L 59–66	13-10 (5-5)	Mullins Center (4,673); Amherst, MA
02/11/2015; 7:00 pm, CBSSN		at No. 20 VCU	W 74–69 ^{2OT}	14–10 (6–5)	Siegel Center (7,637); Richmond, VA
02/14/2015; 2:00 pm		Davidson	L 69–77	14–11 (6–6)	Tom Gola Arena (2,738); Philadelphia, PA
02/18/2015; 7:00 pm		Duquesne	W 87–72	15–11 (7–6)	Tom Gola Arena (1,721); Philadelphia, PA
02/22/2015; 2:30 pm, NBCSN		at Saint Louis	L 64–68 ^{OT}	15–12 (7–7)	Chaifetz Arena (7,980); St. Louis, MO
02/25/2015; 7:00 pm		at Fordham	L 48–63	15–13 (7–8)	Rose Hill Gymnasium (1,586); Bronx, NY
02/28/2015; 12:30 pm, NBCSN		Rhode Island	L 56–59	15–14 (7–9)	Tom Gola Arena (2,286); Philadelphia, PA
03/04/2015; 7:00 pm, CBSSN		at Saint Joseph's	L 50–55	15–15 (7–10)	Hagan Arena (3,743); Philadelphia, PA
03/07/2015; 6:00 pm, CBSSN		Dayton	W 55–53	16–15 (8–10)	Tom Gola Arena (2,305); Philadelphia, PA
Atlantic 10 tournament
03/12/2015; 12:00 pm, NBCSN		vs. Massachusetts; Second Round	W 76–69	17–15	Barclays Center; Brooklyn, NY
03/13/2015; 12:00 pm, NBCSN		vs. Davidson; Quarterfinals	L 66–67	17–16	Barclays Center; Brooklyn, NY
*Non-conference game. ^{#}Rankings from AP Poll. (#) Tournament seedings in parentheses. All times are in Eastern Time.

== See also ==
- 2014–15 La Salle Explorers women's basketball team
