= Eric Paschall =

American basketball player (born 1996)

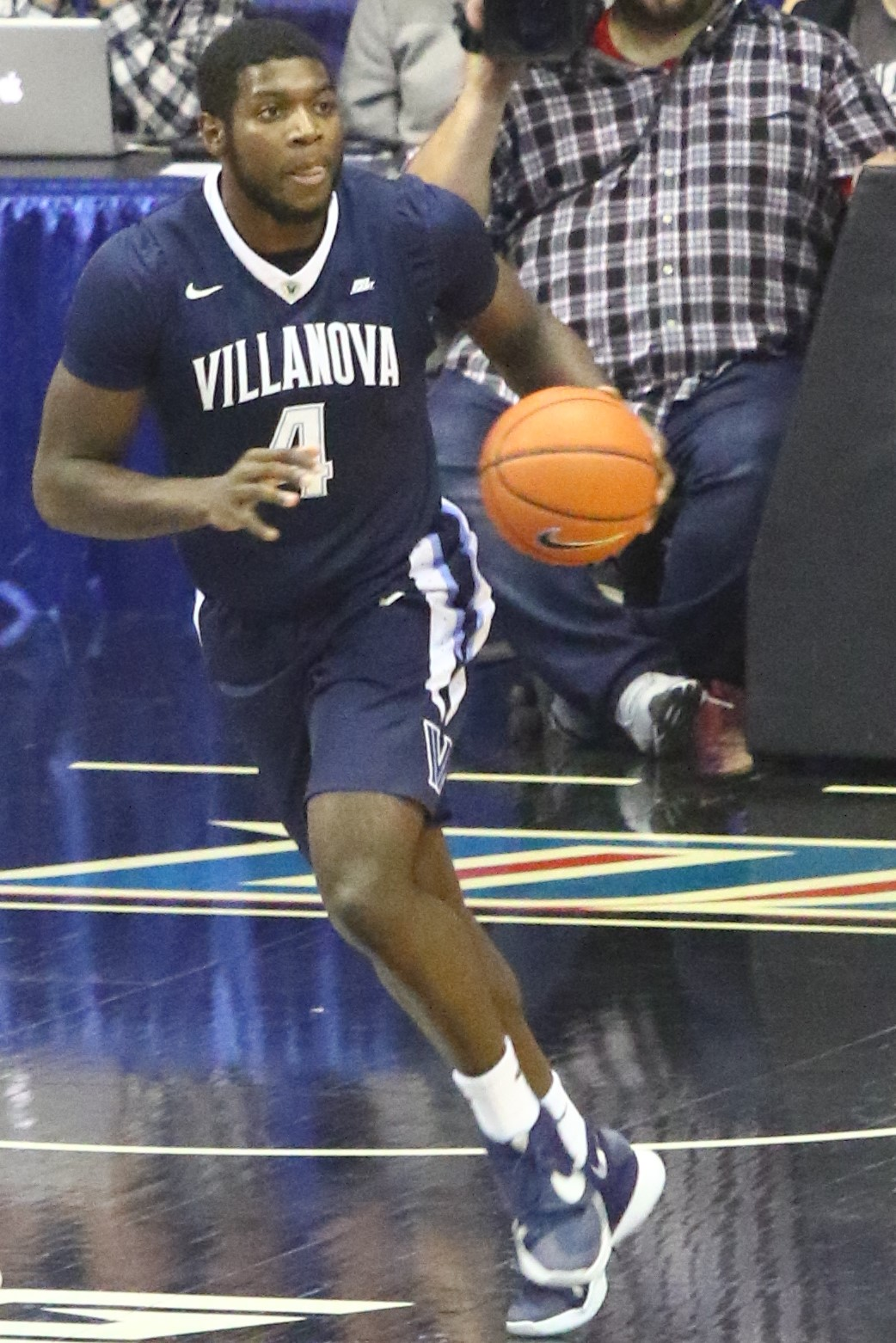
- Paschall with Villanova in 2017

No. 7 – Bambitious Nara
- Position: Power forward
- League: B.League

Personal information
- Born: November 4, 1996 (age 30) North Tarrytown, New York, U.S.
- Listed height: 6 ft 7 in (2.01 m)
- Listed weight: 255 lb (116 kg)

Career information
- High school: Dobbs Ferry (Dobbs Ferry, New York); St. Thomas More (Oakdale, Connecticut)
- College: Fordham (2014–2015); Villanova (2016–2019)
- NBA draft: 2019: 2nd round, 41st overall pick
- Drafted by: Golden State Warriors
- Playing career: 2019–present

Career history
- 2019–2021: Golden State Warriors
- 2021–2022: Utah Jazz
- 2023: Leones de Ponce
- 2024: Pistoia Basket 2000
- 2025: Shijiazhuang Xianglan
- 2025–2026: Hubei Wenlv
- 2026–present: Bambitious Nara

Career highlights
- NBA All-Rookie First Team (2020); NCAA champion (2018); First-team All-Big East (2019); Atlantic Ten Rookie of the Year (2015)
- Stats at NBA.com
- Stats at Basketball Reference

Eric Luther Paschall (/ˈpæskəl/; born November 4, 1996) is an American professional basketball player for Bambitious Nara of the Japanese B.League. He played college basketball for the Fordham Rams and the Villanova Wildcats. He was selected with the 41st overall pick in the 2019 NBA draft by the Golden State Warriors and named to the NBA All-Rookie First Team in 2020.

== Early life ==
Paschall was born in Sleepy Hollow, New York, the son of Juan Eric Paschall and Cecelia Brooks-Paschall. His siblings are Ellen, Eudora and Tia. Growing up, he was given the nickname "Stepzz" for his deadly stepback. Paschall played AAU ball with and befriended future NBA player, and future teammate, Donovan Mitchell. He attended Dobbs Ferry High School and averaged 20 points and nine rebounds per game as a sophomore. As a junior, Paschall was named state Class B player of the year and Westchester County Mr. Basketball. He averaged 26.0 points, 11.2 rebounds and 2.5 assists per game to lead the Eagles to Section 1 finals. Paschall transferred to St. Thomas More School as a senior, where he helped the team advance to the National Prep School Championship title game. Paschall was honored as the NEPSAC AAA Player of the Year.

== College career ==
Paschall committed to play for Fordham. He debuted with 31 points and ten rebounds against New York Tech, setting a school record for most points by a freshman in his opening game. As a freshman, he was twice named Atlantic 10 Rookie of the Week. He missed four games due to a leg injury. Paschall averaged 15.9 points and 5.5 rebounds per game and was named Atlantic 10 Rookie of the Year. After the season, Paschall opted to transfer to Villanova after coach Tom Pecora was fired. He redshirted on the national championship team.

As a sophomore, Paschall averaged 7.2 points and 3.8 rebounds per game. He recorded a season-high 19 points to push the Wildcats to win versus Creighton 79–63 on February 25, 2017. In the Big East quarterfinals, he had 17 points and five rebounds in a 108–67 win over St. John's.

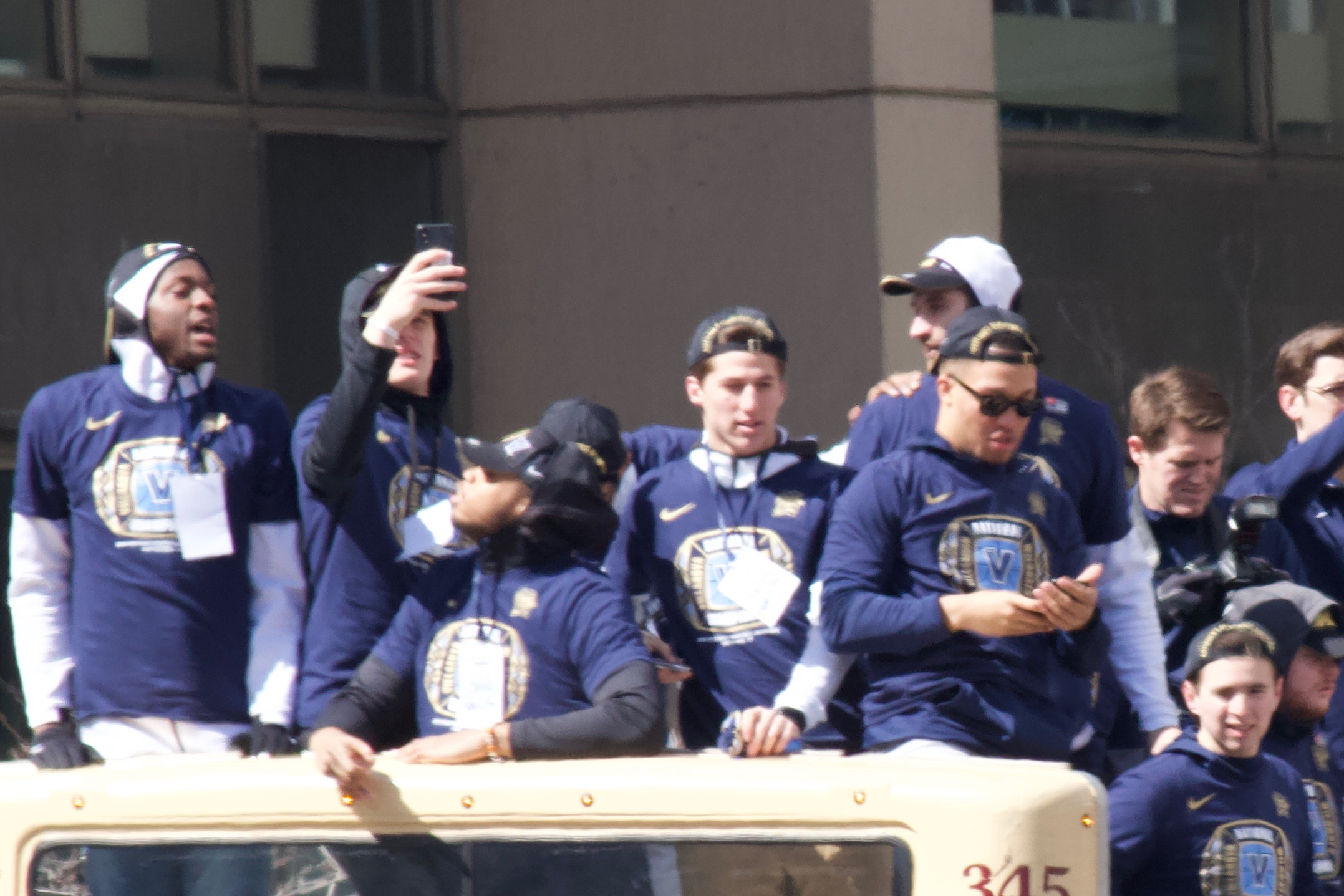
Paschall, Donte DiVincenzo, Omari Spellman, Collin Gillespie and Jalen Brunson at Villanova's NCAA championship parade in 2018

Paschall missed two games in February 2018 with a concussion. He averaged 10.3 points, 5.0 rebounds and 2.3 assists per game as a junior. In the Sweet Sixteen of the 2018 NCAA tournament, he had 14 points in the win versus West Virginia. In the Elite Eight, Paschall had 12 points and 14 rebounds in a 71–59 win over Texas Tech. He had one of his best overall games in the Final Four, scoring 24 points on 10-of-11 shooting to help the Wildcats beat Kansas 95–79.

As a senior, Paschall averaged 16.5 points and 6.2 rebounds per game. He was named to the First-Team All-Big East.

== Professional career ==
=== Golden State Warriors (2019–2021) ===
On June 20, 2019, Paschall was selected 41st overall in the second round of the 2019 NBA draft by the Golden State Warriors. On October 24, Paschall made his debut in the NBA, coming off the bench in a 141–122 loss to the Los Angeles Clippers with 14 points, four rebounds, three assists and two steals. On his birthday on November 4, he scored a career-high 34 points with 13 rebounds in a 127–118 win over the Portland Trail Blazers. On September 15, 2020, Paschall was named to the NBA All-Rookie First Team.

=== Utah Jazz (2021–2022) ===
On August 7, 2021, Paschall was traded to the Utah Jazz in return for a protected 2026 second-round pick via the Memphis Grizzlies.

On July 30, 2022, Paschall signed with the Minnesota Timberwolves on a one-year two-way contract deal. He was waived on October 19.

=== Leones de Ponce (2023) ===
On March 7, 2023, Paschall signed with Leones de Ponce of the Baloncesto Superior Nacional (BSN). He was released on April 10.

=== Pistoia Basket 2000 (2024–2025) ===
On August 2, 2024, Paschall signed with Pistoia Basket 2000 of the Lega Basket Serie A (LBA).

=== Bambitious Nara (2026–present) ===
On August 16, 2026, Paschall signed with Bambitious Nara of the Japanese B.League.

== Career statistics ==
Legend
GP	Games played	GS	Games started	MPG	Minutes per game
FG%	Field goal percentage	3P%	3-point field goal percentage	FT%	Free throw percentage
RPG	Rebounds per game	APG	Assists per game	SPG	Steals per game
BPG	Blocks per game	PPG	Points per game	**Bold**	Career high

=== NBA ===
==== Regular season ====
Year	Team	GP	GS	MPG	FG%	3P%	FT%	RPG	APG	SPG	BPG	PPG
2019–20	Golden State	**60**	**26**	**27.6**	**.497**	.287	**.774**	**4.6**	**2.1**	**.5**	**.2**	**14.0**
2020–21	Golden State	40	2	17.4	**.497**	.333	.713	3.2	1.3	.3	**.2**	9.5
2021–22	Utah	58	3	12.7	.485	**.370**	.767	1.8	.6	.2	.1	5.8
Career		158	31	19.5	.494	.326	.758	3.2	1.4	.3	.2	9.8

==== Playoffs ====
Year	Team	GP	GS	MPG	FG%	3P%	FT%	RPG	APG	SPG	BPG	PPG
2022	Utah	4	0	6.0	.500	.500	1.000	1.3	.0	.3	.0	2.0
Career		4	0	6.0	.500	.500	1.000	1.3	.0	.3	.0	2.0

=== College ===
Year	Team	GP	GS	MPG	FG%	3P%	FT%	RPG	APG	SPG	BPG	PPG
2014–15	Fordham	27	27	31.2	.419	.315	.794	5.5	1.0	.8	.4	15.9
2015–16	Villanova	Redshirt										
2016–17	Villanova	36	8	21.7	.513	.279	.695	3.8	.6	.5	.5	7.2
2017–18	Villanova	**38**	**38**	29.8	**.533**	**.356**	**.813**	5.3	**2.2**	**.9**	**.6**	10.6
2018–19	Villanova	36	36	**36.1**	.447	.348	.746	**6.1**	2.1	.7	.5	**16.5**
Career		137	109	29.6	.468	.331	.765	5.1	1.5	.7	.5	12.3
