= Marcus Posley =

American basketball player (born 1994)

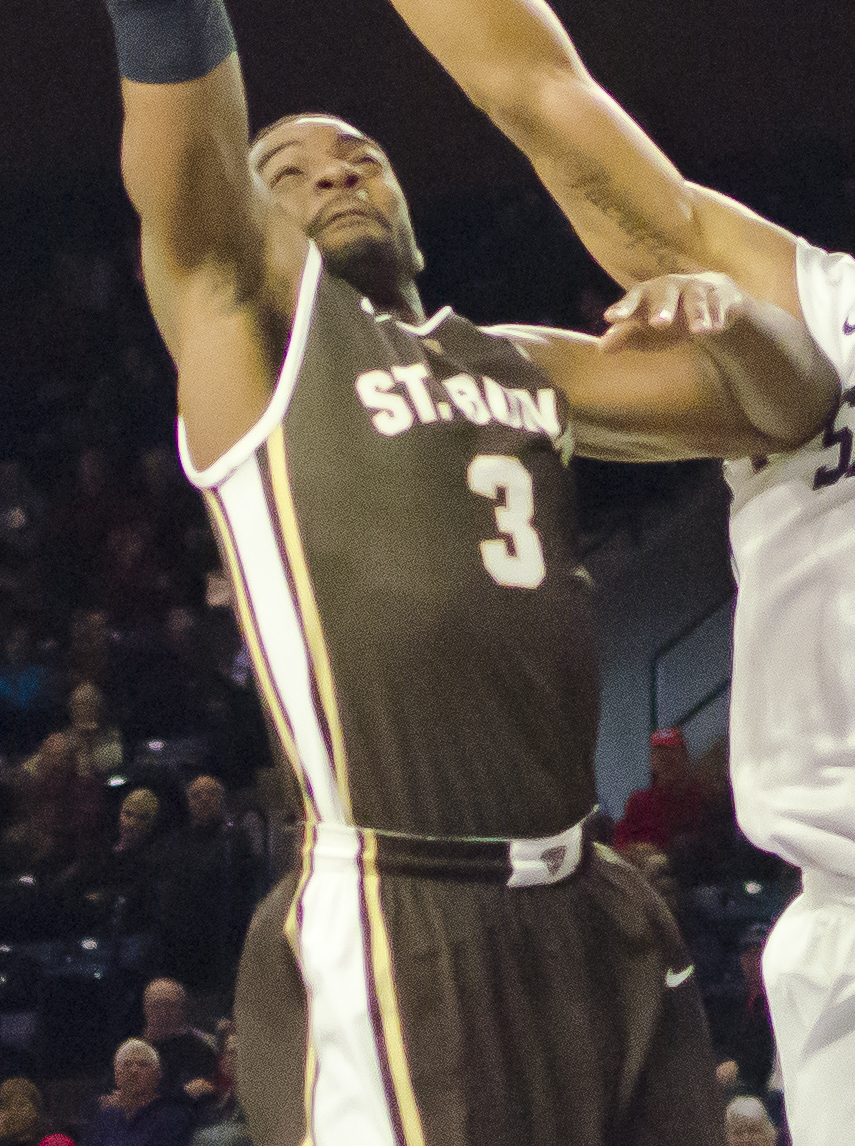

Personal information
- Born: April 14, 1994 (age 32) Rockford, Illinois
- Listed height: 6 ft 1 in (1.85 m)
- Listed weight: 201 lb (91 kg)

Career information
- High school: Winnebago (Winnebago, Illinois); Auburn (Rockford, Illinois)
- College: Ball State (2012–2013); Indian Hills CC (2013–2014); St. Bonaventure (2014–2016)
- NBA draft: 2016: undrafted
- Playing career: 2016–present
- Position: Point guard / shooting guard

Career history
- 2016–2017: Sioux Falls Skyforce
- 2017–2018: Koroivos
- 2018: Sioux Falls Skyforce
- 2019–2020: TSU Hyundai

Career highlights
- Second-team All-Atlantic 10 (2016); Third-team All-Atlantic 10 (2015)

Marcus Steffon Posley (born April 14, 1994) is an American professional basketball player. He played college basketball for Ball State, Indian Hills Community College and St. Bonaventure.

== High school career ==
Posley played high school basketball at Winnebago High School in Winnebago, Illinois and at Auburn High School in Rockford, Illinois. As a junior, he earned Illinois High School Association All-State honors as he averaged 19.4 points per game and 4.5 assists per contest AND WAS named to the All-Northern Illinois Conference and All-Area teams as a junior. For his senior season, Posley was transferred to Auburn High School, but he was unable to play there due to state rules. He played AAU basketball for Pryme Tyme and coach Anthony Cornell, along with Fred VanVleet, leading his team to the Orlando Super Showcase championship and to the Best Buy Summer Classic championship in Minneapolis.

== College career ==
Posley played college basketball for Ball State, Indian Hills Community College and St. Bonaventure.

On March 2, 2016, Posley scored 47 points for St. Bonaventure in a game against Saint Joseph's at the Lightower Conference Classic to become the player to score the most points in a single game in Division-I basketball for the season.

St. Bonaventure finished the 2015–16 season as co-champions of the Atlantic 10 regular season, sharing honors with Dayton and VCU

== Professional career ==
After going undrafted in the 2016 NBA draft, Posley was selected from the Sioux Falls Skyforce in Round 2 with Pick 22 in the 2016 NBA Development League Draft. In 47 games, he went on to average 9.7 points, 2 rebounds and 2 assists per game.

On July 29, 2017, Posley signed with Koroivos of the Greek Basket League.

Posley was re-acquired by Sioux Falls on November 21, 2018, as a replacement for DeAndre Liggins, who temporarily left the team to compete in FIBA World Cup qualifying games.

Posley was released from Sioux Falls Skyforce after only two games and signed with TSU Hyundai of the Georgian Superliga in February 2019.

== The Basketball Tournament ==
Marcus Posley played for Team Showtime in the 2018 edition of The Basketball Tournament. In two games, he averaged a team-high 18.0 points per game, 2.5 assists per game and 4.5 rebounds per game. Team Showtime reached the second round before falling to Louisiana United.
