= 2014–15 George Washington Colonials men's basketball team =

American college basketball season

2014–15 George Washington Colonials men's basketball

Diamond Head Classic champions

NIT, Second round
- Conference: Atlantic 10 Conference
- Record: 22–13 (10–8 A-10)
- Head coach: Mike Lonergan (4th season)
- Assistant coaches: Hajj Turner; Maurice Joseph; Carmen Maciariello
- Home arena: Charles E. Smith Center

2014–15 Atlantic 10 men's basketball standings
	Conf.				Overall
Team	W		L	PCT	W		L	PCT
Davidson	14	–	4	.778	24	–	8	.750
Dayton	13	–	5	.722	27	–	9	.750
Rhode Island	13	–	5	.722	23	–	10	.697
VCU †	12	–	6	.667	26	–	10	.722
Richmond	12	–	6	.667	21	–	14	.600
George Washington	10	–	8	.556	22	–	13	.629
St. Bonaventure	10	–	8	.556	18	–	13	.581
UMass	10	–	8	.556	17	–	15	.531
La Salle	8	–	10	.444	17	–	16	.515
Saint Joseph's	7	–	11	.389	13	–	18	.419
Duquesne	6	–	12	.333	12	–	19	.387
Fordham	4	–	14	.222	10	–	21	.323
George Mason	4	–	14	.222	9	–	22	.290
Saint Louis	3	–	15	.167	11	–	21	.344
† 2015 A10 tournament winner Rankings from AP poll

The 2014–15 George Washington Colonials men's basketball team represented George Washington University during the 2014–15 NCAA Division I men's basketball season. The Colonials, led by fourth year head coach Mike Lonergan, played their home games at the Charles E. Smith Center and were members of the Atlantic 10 Conference. They finished the season 22–13, 10–8 in A-10 play to finish in a three-way tie for sixth place. They advanced to the quarterfinals of the A-10 tournament where they lost to Rhode Island. They were invited to the National Invitation Tournament where they defeated Pittsburgh in the first round before losing in the second round to Temple.

== Previous season ==
The 2013–14 George Washington Colonials finished the season with an overall record of 24–9, with a record of 11–5 in the Atlantic 10 regular season in a tie for third place. In the 2014 Atlantic 10 tournament, the Colonials lost to VCU in the semifinals. They received an at-large bid to the NCAA tournament where they lost in the second round to Memphis.

== Off season ==
=== Departures ===
Name	Number	Pos.	Height	Weight	Year	Hometown	Notes
Maurice Creek	1	G	6'5"	195	GS Senior	Oxon Hill, MD	Graduated
Miguel Cartagena	3	G	6'2"	170	Freshman	Aibonito, PR	Transferred to College of Central Florida
Nemanja Mikic	30	F	6'8"	213	Senior	Novi Sad, Serbia	Graduated
Isaiah Armwood	32	F	6'9"	208	Senior	Baltimore, MD	Graduated
Paris Maragkos	33	F	6'9"	243	Sophomore	Marousi, GRE	Transferred to American
Skyler White	43	F	6'8"	238	Freshman	Clyde Hill, WA	Transferred to Idaho

=== Incoming transfers ===
Name	Number	Pos.	Height	Weight	Year	Hometown	Previous School
Matt Hart		G	6'2"	180	Junior	Orchard Park, NY	Transferred from Hamilton College. Under NCAA transfer rules, Hart will have to redshirt from the 2014–15 season. Will have two years of remaining eligibility.
Tyler Cavanaugh		F	6'9"	230	Junior	Dewitt, NY	Transferred from Wake Forest. Under NCAA transfer rules, Cavanaugh will have to redshirt from the 2014–15 season. Will have two years of remaining eligibility.

== Incoming recruits ==
College recruiting information
Name	Hometown	School	Height	Weight	Commit date
Matt Cimino; C	Falmouth, ME	Worcester Academy	6 ft 9 in (2.06 m)	200 lb (91 kg)	Mar 16, 2014
Matt Cimino; C	Recruit ratings: Scout: Rivals: (78)				
Yuta Watanabe; SF	Kita, JAP	St. Thomas More School	6 ft 7 in (2.01 m)	200 lb (91 kg)	Feb 4, 2014
Yuta Watanabe; SF	Recruit ratings: Scout: Rivals: (77)				
Anthony Swan; SF	Bowie, MD	Princeton Day Academy	6 ft 5 in (1.96 m)	180 lb (82 kg)	May 13, 2013
Anthony Swan; SF	Recruit ratings: Scout: Rivals: (71)				
Paul Jorgensen; PG	Ramsey, NJ	Don Bosco High School	6 ft 3 in (1.91 m)	185 lb (84 kg)	Sep 5, 2013
Paul Jorgensen; PG	Recruit ratings: Scout: Rivals: (70)				
Darian Bryant; SF	Washington, D.C.	Saint John's College High School	6 ft 3 in (1.91 m)	200 lb (91 kg)	Aug 22, 2013
Darian Bryant; SF	Recruit ratings: Scout: Rivals: (N/A)				
Overall recruit ranking:
Note: In many cases, Scout, Rivals, 247Sports, On3, and ESPN may conflict in their listings of height and weight.; In these cases, the average was taken. ESPN grades are on a 100-point scale.; Sources: "2014 Team Ranking". Rivals.

== Roster ==
2014–15 George Washington Colonials men's basketball team
Players
Coaches

Pos.	#	Name	Height	Weight	Year	Hometown
G	3	Paul Jorgensen	6 ft 2 in (1.88 m)	180 lb (82 kg)	Fr	Ramsey, NJ
G/F	4	Anthony Swan	6 ft 8 in (2.03 m)	190 lb (86 kg)	Fr	Los Angeles, CA
G	5	Nick Griffin	6 ft 3 in (1.91 m)	173 lb (78 kg)	So	Rockville, MD
G	11	Kethan Savage	6 ft 3 in (1.91 m)	200 lb (91 kg)	Jr	Fairfax, VA
F	12	Yuta Watanabe	6 ft 8 in (2.03 m)	200 lb (91 kg)	Fr	Kita, JAP
G/F	13	Patricio Garino	6 ft 6 in (1.98 m)	211 lb (96 kg)	Jr	Mar del Plata, ARG
G	15	Darian Bryant	6 ft 4 in (1.93 m)	200 lb (91 kg)	Fr	Washington, DC
F	20	Ryan McCoy	6 ft 9 in (2.06 m)	207 lb (94 kg)	RS Jr	Skillman, NJ
F	21	Kevin Larsen	6 ft 10 in (2.08 m)	247 lb (112 kg)	Jr	Copenhagen, DEN
G	22	Joe McDonald	6 ft 1 in (1.85 m)	184 lb (83 kg)	Jr	Lorton, VA
F	34	John Kopriva	6 ft 8 in (2.03 m)	214 lb (97 kg)	Sr	Milwaukee, WI
F	45	Matt Cimino	6 ft 10 in (2.08 m)	200 lb (91 kg)	Fr	Falmouth, ME
G		Matt Hart (redshirt)	6 ft 2 in (1.88 m)	180 lb (82 kg)	Jr	Orchard Park, NY
F		Tyler Cavanaugh (redshirt)	6 ft 9 in (2.06 m)	230 lb (104 kg)	Jr	Syracuse, NY

Head coach

- Mike Lonergan (Catholic)

Assistant coach(es)

- Hajj Turner (Louisville)
- Maurice Joseph (Vermont)
- Carmen Maciariello (Siena)

Legend

- (C) Team captain
- (S) Suspended
- (I) Ineligible
- (W) Walk-on
- Injured
- Current redshirt

Roster

== Schedule ==
Date time, TV	Rank^{#}	Opponent^{#}	Result	Record	Site (attendance) city, state
Exhibition
11/08/2014*; 7:00 pm		Bloomsburg	W 89–47		Charles E. Smith Center (1,744); Washington, D.C.
Non-conference regular season
11/14/2014*; 7:00 pm		Grambling State	W 92–40	1–0	Charles E. Smith Center (3,446); Washington, D.C.
11/16/2014*; 7:00 pm, BTN		at Rutgers	W 70–53	2–0	The RAC (5,824); Piscataway, NJ
11/21/2014*; 7:00 pm, ESPN3		at No. 9 Virginia	L 42–59	2–1	John Paul Jones Arena (13,706); Charlottesville, VA
11/26/2014*; 7:00 pm		Longwood	W 91–66	3–1	Charles E. Smith Center (1,897); Washington, D.C.
11/29/2014*; 4:00 pm, FSN		at Seton Hall	L 54–58	3–2	Prudential Center (7,774); Newark, NJ
12/04/2014*; 7:00 pm		UMBC	W 83–60	4–2	Charles E. Smith Center (2,481); Washington, D.C.
12/07/2014*; 2:30 pm, FSN		vs. Charlotte; BB&T Classic Basketball Tournament	W 78–70	5–2	Verizon Center (8,756); Washington, D.C.
12/11/2014*; 7:00 pm, CSN		DePaul	W 81–68	6–2	Charles E. Smith Center (2,712); Washington, D.C.
12/14/2014*; 12:00 pm, ESPN3		at Penn State	L 51–64	6–3	Bryce Jordan Center (9,991); University Park, PA
12/22/2014*; 2:30 pm, ESPNU		vs. Ohio; Diamond Head Classic quarterfinals	W 77–49	7–3	Stan Sheriff Center (8,297); Honolulu, HI
12/23/2014*; 4:30 pm, ESPNU		vs. Colorado; Diamond Head Classic semifinals	W 53–50	8–3	Stan Sheriff Center (7,875); Honolulu, HI
12/25/2014*; 8:30 pm, ESPN2		vs. No. 11 Wichita State; Diamond Head Classic championship	W 60–54	9–3	Stan Sheriff Center (5,125); Honolulu, HI
12/30/2014*; 7:00 pm		VMI	W 80–60	10–3	Charles E. Smith Center (2,828); Washington, D.C.
Atlantic 10 regular season
01/03/2015; 2:00 pm, CBSSN		at Saint Joseph's	W 64–60	11–3 (1–0)	Hagan Arena (4,200); Philadelphia, PA
01/06/2015; 7:00 pm, CBSSN		Saint Louis	W 75–72	12–3 (2–0)	Charles E. Smith Center (2,734); Washington, D.C.
01/10/2015; 12:30 pm, NBCSN		at La Salle	L 50–63	12–4 (2–1)	Tom Gola Arena (2,041); Philadelphia, PA
01/15/2015; 7:00 pm, ESPNU		Richmond	W 73–70 ^{2OT}	13–4 (3–1)	Charles E. Smith Center (3,621); Washington, D.C.
01/17/2015; 4:30 pm, NBCSN		George Mason	W 63–53	14–4 (4–1)	Charles E. Smith Center (4,313); Washington, D.C.
01/22/2015; 7:00 pm, NBCSN		at Fordham	W 79–59	15–4 (5–1)	Rose Hill Gymnasium (2,316); Bronx, NY
01/24/2015; 2:00 pm		Duquesne; Homecoming	W 74–59	16–4 (6–1)	Charles E. Smith Center (4,697); Washington, D.C.
01/27/2015; 7:00 pm, CBSSN		at No. 14 VCU	L 48–72	16–5 (6–2)	Siegel Center (7,637); Richmond, VA
01/31/2015; 2:00 pm, CSN		at Rhode Island	L 55–59	16–6 (6–3)	Ryan Center (7,097); Kingston, RI
02/06/2015; 7:00 pm, ESPN2		Dayton	W 65–64	17–6 (7–3)	Charles E. Smith Center (4,579); Washington, D.C.
02/11/2015; 7:00 pm, SNY		at Duquesne	L 62–78	17–7 (7–4)	Palumbo Center (1,883); Pittsburgh, PA
02/14/2015; 2:00 pm, ESPN2		No. 20 VCU	L 66–79	17–8 (7–5)	Charles E. Smith Center (4,816); Washington, D.C.
02/18/2015; 7:00 pm, CSN		Davidson	L 63–65	17–9 (7–6)	Charles E. Smith Center (3,012); Washington, D.C.
02/21/2015; 4:00 pm, CBSSN		at Richmond	L 48–56	17–10 (7–7)	Robins Center (7,201); Richmond, VA
02/25/2015; 7:00 pm, ASN		St. Bonaventure	W 69–46	18–10 (8–7)	Charles E. Smith Center (2,560); Washington, D.C.
02/28/2015; 7:00 pm, MASN2		at Davidson	L 66–77	18–11 (8–8)	John M. Belk Arena (5,223); Davidson, NC
03/04/2015; 7:00 pm, SNY		at George Mason	W 67–51	19–11 (9–8)	Patriot Center (3,888); Fairfax, VA
03/07/2015; 3:30 pm, NBCSN		Massachusetts	W 87–65	20–11 (10–8)	Charles E. Smith Center (3,867); Washington, D.C.
Atlantic 10 tournament
03/12/2015; 9:00 pm, NBCSN		vs. Duquesne; Second round	W 73–55	21–11	Barclays Center (6,223); Brooklyn, NY
03/13/2015; 9:00 pm, NBCSN		vs. Rhode Island; Quarterfinals	L 58–71	21–12	Barclays Center (7,423); Brooklyn, NY
NIT
03/17/2015*; 7:00 pm, ESPN	(5)	at (4) Pittsburgh; First round	W 60–54	22–12	Petersen Events Center (3,049); Pittsburgh, PA
3/22/2015*; 11:00 am, ESPN	(5)	at (1) Temple; Second round	L 77–90	22–13	Liacouras Center (3,404); Philadelphia, PA
*Non-conference game. ^{#}Rankings from AP Poll. (#) Tournament seedings in parentheses. All times are in Eastern Time. (#) during NIT is seed within region.

== See also ==
- 2014–15 George Washington Colonials women's basketball team
