= 2014–15 NCAA Division I men's basketball rankings =

- Season: 2014–15
- NCAA Tournament: 2015
- Preseason No. 1: Kentucky
- NCAA Tournament Champions: Duke
NCAA Division I men's basketball rankings


Two human polls make up the 2014–15 NCAA Division I men's basketball rankings, the AP Poll and the Coaches Poll, in addition to various publications' preseason polls.

== Legend ==
	Increase in ranking
	Decrease in ranking
	New to rankings from previous week
Italics	Number of first place votes
(#–#)	Win–loss record
т	Tied with team above or below also with this symbol

== AP Poll ==
This poll is compiled by sportswriters across the nation. In Division I men's and women's college basketball, the AP Poll is largely just a tool to compare schools throughout the season and spark debate, as it has no bearing on postseason play.

	Preseason Oct 31	Week 2 Nov 17	Week 3 Nov 24	Week 4 Dec 1	Week 5 Dec 8	Week 6 Dec 15	Week 7 Dec 22	Week 8 Dec 29	Week 9 Jan 5	Week 10 Jan 12	Week 11 Jan 19	Week 12 Jan 26	Week 13 Feb 2	Week 14 Feb 9	Week 15 Feb 16	Week 16 Feb 23	Week 17 Mar 2	Week 18 Mar 9	Week 19 Mar 16	
1.	Kentucky (52)	Kentucky (2–0) (49)	Kentucky (5–0) (62)	Kentucky (7–0) (62)	Kentucky (9–0) (64)	Kentucky (11–0) (65)	Kentucky (12–0) (65)	Kentucky (13–0) (65)	Kentucky (13–0) (64)	Kentucky (15–0) (63)	Kentucky (17–0) (63)	Kentucky (19–0) (64)	Kentucky (21–0) (65)	Kentucky (23–0) (65)	Kentucky (25–0) (65)	Kentucky (27–0) (65)	Kentucky (29–0) (65)	Kentucky (31–0) (65)	Kentucky (34–0) (65)	1.
2.	Arizona (5)	Arizona (2–0) (4)	Wisconsin (4–0) (3)	Wisconsin (7–0) (3)	Duke (8–0)	Duke (8–0)	Duke (10–0)	Duke (10–0)	Duke (13–0)	Virginia (15–0) (2)	Virginia (17–0) (2)	Virginia (19–0) (1)	Gonzaga (22–1)	Virginia (21–1)	Virginia (23–1)	Virginia (25–1)	Virginia (27–1)	Duke (28–3)	Villanova (32–2)	2.
3.	Wisconsin (8)	Wisconsin (2–0) (7)	Arizona (3–0)	Arizona (6–0)	Arizona (8–0)	Arizona (10–0)	Arizona (12–0)	Virginia (11–0)	Virginia (13–0)	Gonzaga (16–1)	Gonzaga (18–1)	Gonzaga (20–1)	Virginia (19–1)	Gonzaga (24–1)	Gonzaga (26–1)	Gonzaga (28–1)	Duke (26–3)	Virginia (28–2)	Wisconsin (31–3)	3.
4.	Duke	Duke (2–0) (4)	Duke (5–0)	Duke (7–0)	Louisville (7–0)	Louisville (9–0)	Louisville (10–0)	Wisconsin (12–1)	Wisconsin (14–1)	Duke (14–1)	Villanova (17–1)	Duke (17–2)	Duke (18–3)	Duke (20–3)	Duke (22–3)	Duke (24–3)	Villanova (27–2)	Villanova (29–2)	Duke (29–4)	4.
5.	Kansas	Kansas (1–0)	North Carolina (3–0)	Louisville (5–0)	Wisconsin (8–1)	Wisconsin (10–1)	Virginia (11–0)	Louisville (11–1)	Louisville (13–1)	Villanova (15–1)	Duke (15–2)	Wisconsin (18–2)	Wisconsin (19–2)	Wisconsin (21–2)	Wisconsin (23–2)	Wisconsin (25–2)	Arizona (26–3)	Arizona (28–3)	Arizona (31–3)	5.
6.	North Carolina	North Carolina (2–0)	Louisville (3–0)	Texas (6–0)	Virginia (9–0)	Virginia (9–0)	Wisconsin (10–1)	Villanova (12–0)	Gonzaga (14–1)	Louisville (14–2)	Wisconsin (16–2)	Arizona (18–2)	Arizona (20–2)	Villanova (21–2)	Villanova (23–2)	Villanova (25–2)	Wisconsin (26–3)	Wisconsin (28–3)	Virginia (29–3)	6.
7.	Florida	Louisville (1–0)	Texas (4–0)	Virginia (7–0)	Villanova (8–0)	Villanova (10–0)	Villanova (11–0)	Gonzaga (12–1)	Arizona (13–1)	Wisconsin (15–2)	Arizona (16–2)	Villanova (18–2)	Villanova (19–2)	Arizona (20–3)	Arizona (22–3)	Arizona (24–3)	Gonzaga (29–2)	Gonzaga (30–2)	Gonzaga (32–2)	7.
8.	Louisville	Florida (1–0)	Virginia (4–0)	Wichita State (4–0)	Texas (7–1)	Gonzaga (9–1)	Gonzaga (11–1)	Arizona (12–1)	Villanova (13–1)	Utah (13–2)	Notre Dame (17–2)	Notre Dame (19–2)	Kansas (18–3)	Kansas (19–4)	Kansas (21–4)	Kansas (22–5)	Wichita State (27–3)	Maryland (26–5)	Notre Dame (29–5)	8.
9.	Virginia	Virginia (2–0)	Wichita State (3–0)	Gonzaga (6–0)	Gonzaga (7–1)	Texas (8–1)	Texas (10–1)	Iowa State (9–1)	Utah (12–2)	Kansas (13–2)	Iowa State (13–3)	Kansas (16–3)	Louisville (18–3)	Louisville (19–4)	Utah (20–4)	Notre Dame (24–4)	Kansas (23–6)	Kansas (24–7)	Iowa State (25–8)	9.
10.	Texas	Texas (2–0)	Gonzaga (4–0)	Villanova (6–0)	Kansas (6–1)	Kansas (8–1)	Kansas (9–1)	Utah (9–2)	Texas (12–2)	Arizona (14–2)	Louisville (15–3)	Louisville (16–3)	Notre Dame (20–3)	Notre Dame (21–4)	Notre Dame (22–4)	Northern Iowa (26–2)	Maryland (24–5)	Northern Iowa (30–3)	Kansas (26–8)	10.
11.	Wichita State	Wichita State (1–0)	Kansas (1–1)	Kansas (5–1)	Wichita State (5–1)	Wichita State (7–1)	Wichita State (8–1)	Texas (10–2)	Maryland (14–1)	Iowa State (12–2)	Kansas (14–3)	Utah (16–3)	Iowa State (16–4)	Utah (18–4)	Northern Iowa (24–2)	Wichita State (25–3)	Northern Iowa (27–3)	Notre Dame (26–5)	Northern Iowa (30–3)	11.
12.	Villanova	Villanova (1–0)	Villanova (3–0)	North Carolina (5–1)	Ohio State (6–1)	Ohio State (8–1)	Iowa State (9–1)	Maryland (12–1)	Kansas (11–2)	Notre Dame (15–2)	Utah (14–3)	Wichita State (18–2)	North Carolina (17–5)	North Carolina (18–6)	Louisville (20–5)	Iowa State (20–6)	Notre Dame (24–5)	Wichita State (28–4)	Maryland (27–6)	12.
13.	Gonzaga	Gonzaga (1–0)	Iowa State (2–0)	San Diego State (5–1)	Utah (6–1)	Iowa State (8–1)	Washington (10–0)	Kansas (9–2)	Notre Dame (14–1)	Wichita State (14–2)	Maryland (17–2)	North Carolina (16–4)	Utah (17–4)	Northern Iowa (22–2)	Wichita State (23–3)	Utah (21–5)	Utah (22–6)	Iowa State (22–8)	Oklahoma (22–10)	13.
14.	Iowa State	Iowa State (1–0)	VCU (3–0)	Ohio State (5–0)	Iowa State (5–1)	Utah (7–2)	Utah (8–2)	Notre Dame (12–1)	West Virginia (13–1)	Maryland (15–2)	Wichita State (16–2)	VCU (16–3)	Northern Iowa (20–2)	Iowa State (17–5)	Iowa State (18–6)	Maryland (22–5)	Baylor (22–7)	Louisville (24–7)	Wichita State (28–4)	14.
15.	VCU	VCU (1–0)	San Diego State (3–0)	Miami (FL) (7–0)	Butler (7–1)	Oklahoma (6–2)	Maryland (11–1)	St. John's (11–1)	Wichita State (12–2)	North Carolina (12–4)	North Carolina (14–4)	Iowa State (14–4)	West Virginia (18–3)	Wichita State (21–3)	North Carolina (18–7)	North Carolina (19–8)	Oklahoma (20–8)	Oklahoma (21–9)	North Carolina (24–11)	15.
16.	San Diego State	San Diego State (1–0)	Ohio State (3–0)	West Virginia (7–0)	Oklahoma (5–2)	Washington (8–0)	Notre Dame (11–1)	Wichita State (10–2)	Oklahoma (10–3)	West Virginia (14–2)	VCU (15–3)	Maryland (18–3)	Wichita State (19–3)	Baylor (18–5)	Maryland (21–5)	Oklahoma (19–8)	Louisville (23–6)	Baylor (23–8)	Baylor (24–9)	16.
17.	UConn	UConn (1–0)	Miami (FL) (5–0)	Michigan (5–1)	Washington (7–0)	Maryland (10–1)	St. John's (9–1)	West Virginia (11–1)	Iowa State (10–2)	VCU (13–3)	Texas (13–4)	West Virginia (16–3)	Maryland (18–4)	Oklahoma (16–7)	Oklahoma (17–8)	Louisville (21–6)	Iowa State (20–8)	Utah (23–7)	Louisville (24–8)	17.
18.	Michigan State	Oklahoma (1–0)	Florida (2–1)	Arkansas (6–0)	San Diego State (6–2)	Miami (FL) (9–1)	West Virginia (10–1)	Oklahoma (8–3)	North Carolina (11–3)	Oklahoma (11–4)	West Virginia (15–3)	Northern Iowa (18–2)	VCU (17–4)	Butler (18–6)	Arkansas (20–5)	Arkansas (22–5)	Arkansas (23–6)	West Virginia (23–8)	SMU (27–6)	18.
19.	Oklahoma	Michigan State (1–0)	Michigan (3–0)	Michigan State (5–2)	Maryland (8–1)	San Diego State (7–2)	Oklahoma (7–3)	North Carolina (9–3)	Seton Hall (12–2)	Arkansas (13–2)	Oklahoma (15–5)	Texas (14–5)	Baylor (16–5)	Maryland (19–5)	Butler (18–7)	Baylor (20–7)	North Carolina (20–9)	North Carolina (21–10)	Utah (24–8)	19.
20.	Ohio State	Ohio State (1–0)	Michigan State (2–1)	Iowa State (3–1)	Miami (FL) (8–1)	St. John's (8–1)	North Carolina (8–3)	Ohio State (11–2)	VCU (11–3)	Texas (12–4)	Northern Iowa (16–2)	Baylor (15–4)	Ohio State (17–5)	VCU (18–5)	Baylor (18–7)	West Virginia (21–6)	West Virginia (22–7)	SMU (24–6)	West Virginia (23–9)	20.
21.	Nebraska	Nebraska (1–0)	West Virginia (5–0)	Maryland (7–0)	North Carolina (6–2)	Notre Dame (10–1)	Ohio State (10–2)	Washington (11–1)	Baylor (11–2)	Seton Hall (13–3)	Baylor (13–4)	Georgetown (14–5)	Oklahoma (14–7)	Oklahoma State (16–7) т	SMU (21–5)	SMU (22–5)	Butler (21–8)	Arkansas (24–7)	Arkansas (26–8)	21.
22.	SMU	SMU (1–0)	UCLA (4–0)	Oklahoma (4–2)	West Virginia (8–1)	West Virginia (9–1)	Baylor (9–1)	Baylor (10–1)	Ohio State (12–3)	Baylor (12–3)	Dayton (15–2)	Indiana (15–5)	Butler (16–6)	West Virginia (18–5) т	Oklahoma State (17–8)	VCU (21–6)	SMU (23–6)	Butler (22–9)	Georgetown (21–10)	22.
23.	Syracuse	Syracuse (2–0)	Creighton (4–0)	Butler (5–1)	Northern Iowa (8–0)	Butler (8–2)	Northern Iowa (10–1)	Northern Iowa (11–1)	Arkansas (11–2)	Northern Iowa (14–2)	Indiana (14–4)	Miami (FL) (14–5)	SMU (18–4)	Ohio State (18–6)	West Virginia (19–6)	Butler (19–8)	Ohio State (21–8)	Georgetown (20–9)	Michigan State (23–11)	23.
24.	Michigan	Michigan (1–0)	UConn (3–1)	Illinois (6–0)	St. John's (6–1)	North Carolina (6–3)	Colorado State (11–0)	Colorado State (13–0)	St. John's (11–3)	Oklahoma State (12–3)	Seton Hall (13–4)	Oklahoma (12–7)	Georgetown (15–6)	Arkansas (18–5)	Ohio State (19–7)	San Diego State (22–6)	Providence (20–9)	Davidson (23–6)	Butler (22–10)	24.
25.	Harvard т Utah т	Utah (1–0)	Arkansas (3–0)	Utah (5–1)	Notre Dame (8–1)	Michigan State (7–3)	TCU (11–0)	Georgetown (8–3)	Old Dominion (12–1)	Wyoming (13–2)	Iowa (13–5)	Butler (15–6)	Texas (14–7)	SMU (19–5)	VCU (19–6)	Providence (19–8)	Murray State (26–4)	Boise State (24–7)	VCU (26–9)	25.
	Preseason Oct 31	Week 2 Nov 17	Week 3 Nov 24	Week 4 Dec 1	Week 5 Dec 8	Week 6 Dec 15	Week 7 Dec 22	Week 8 Dec 29	Week 9 Jan 5	Week 10 Jan 12	Week 11 Jan 19	Week 12 Jan 26	Week 13 Feb 2	Week 14 Feb 9	Week 15 Feb 16	Week 16 Feb 23	Week 17 Mar 2	Week 18 Mar 9	Week 19 Mar 16	
		Dropped: Harvard (1–1)	Dropped: Oklahoma (2–1); Nebraska (2–1); SMU (2–2); Syracuse (3–1); Utah (2–1)	Dropped: VCU (4–2); Florida (3–3); UCLA (5–2); Creighton (6–1); UConn (3–2)	Dropped: Michigan (6–2); Arkansas (6–2); Michigan State (6–3); Illinois (7–1)	Dropped: Northern Iowa (9–1)	Dropped: Miami (FL) (9–2); San Diego State (8–3); Butler (8–3); Michigan State (8–4)	Dropped: TCU (12–0)	Dropped: Washington (11–3); Northern Iowa (12–2); Colorado State (14–1); Georgetown (9–4)	Dropped: Ohio State (13–4); Old Dominion (13–2); St. John's (11–4)	Dropped: Arkansas (13–4); Oklahoma St (12–5); Wyoming (16–3)	Dropped: Dayton (16–3); Seton Hall (13–6); Iowa (13–7)	Dropped: Indiana (16–6); Miami (FL) (14–7)	Dropped: Georgetown (15–8); Texas (15–8)	None	Dropped: Oklahoma State (17–10); Ohio State (19–8)	Dropped: VCU (21–8); San Diego State (22–7)	Dropped: Ohio State (22–9); Providence (21–10); Murray State (27–5)	Dropped: Davidson (24–7); Boise State (25–8)	

== USA Today Coaches Poll ==
The Coaches Poll is the second oldest poll still in use after the AP Poll. It is compiled by a rotating group of 32 college Division I head coaches. The Poll operates by Borda count. Each voting member ranks teams from 1 to 25. Each team then receives points for their ranking in reverse order: Number 1 earns 25 points, number 2 earns 24 points, and so forth. The points are then combined and the team with the highest points is then ranked #1; second highest is ranked #2 and so forth. Only the top 25 teams with points are ranked, with teams receiving first place votes noted the quantity next to their name. The maximum points a single team can earn is 800.

	Preseason Oct 16	Week 2 Nov 17	Week 3 Nov 24	Week 4 Dec 1	Week 5 Dec 8	Week 6 Dec 15	Week 7 Dec 22	Week 8 Dec 29	Week 9 Jan 5	Week 10 Jan 12	Week 11 Jan 19	Week 12 Jan 26	Week 13 Feb 2	Week 14 Feb 9	Week 15 Feb 16	Week 16 Feb 23	Week 17 Mar 2	Week 18 Mar 9	Week 19 Mar 16	Final Apr 7	
1.	Kentucky (24)	Kentucky (2–0) (25)	Kentucky (5–0) (29)	Kentucky (7–0) (29)	Kentucky (9–0) (30)	Kentucky (11–0) (29)	Kentucky (12–0) (30)	Kentucky (13–0) (30)	Kentucky (13–0) (31)	Kentucky (15–0) (31)	Kentucky (17–0) (31)	Kentucky (19–0) (32)	Kentucky (21–0) (31)	Kentucky (23–0) (31)	Kentucky (25–0) (31)	Kentucky (27–0) (32)	Kentucky (29–0) (32)	Kentucky (31–0) (32)	Kentucky (34–0) (32)	Duke (35-4)	1.
2.	Arizona (3)	Arizona (2–0) (3)	Duke (5–0)	Duke (7–0)	Duke (8–0) (1)	Duke (8–0) (1)	Duke (10–0) (1)	Duke (10–0) (1)	Duke (13–0) (1)	Virginia (15–0) (1)	Virginia (17–0) (1)	Virginia (19–0)	Gonzaga (22–1) (1)	Gonzaga (24–1) (1)	Gonzaga (26–1) (1)	Gonzaga (28–1)	Virginia (27–1)	Duke (28–3)	Villanova (32–2)	Wisconsin (36-4)	2.
3.	Duke (2)	Duke (2–0) (2)	Wisconsin (4–0) (2)	Arizona (6–0) (1)	Arizona (8–0) (1)	Arizona (10–0) (1)	Arizona (12–0) (1)	Virginia (11–0)	Virginia (13–0)	Gonzaga (16–1)	Gonzaga (18–1)	Gonzaga (20–1)	Virginia (19–1)	Virginia (21–1)	Virginia (23–1)	Virginia (25–1)	Duke (26–3)	Villanova (29–2)	Wisconsin (31–3)	Kentucky (38-1)	3.
4.	Wisconsin (3)	Wisconsin (2–0) (2)	Arizona (3–0) (1)	Wisconsin (7–0) (2)	Louisville (7–0)	Louisville (9–0)	Louisville (10–0)	Wisconsin (12–1)	Wisconsin (14–1)	Duke (14–1)	Villanova (17–1)	Duke (17–2)	Wisconsin (19–2)	Wisconsin (21–2)	Wisconsin (23–2)	Wisconsin (25–2)	Villanova (27–2)	Virginia (28–2)	Arizona (31–3)	Arizona (34-4)	4.
5.	Kansas	Kansas (1–0)	Louisville (3–0)	Louisville (5–0)	Virginia (9–0)	Virginia (9–0)	Virginia (11–0)	Villanova (12–0)	Louisville (13–1)	Villanova (15–1)	Wisconsin (16–2)	Wisconsin (18–2)	Duke (18–3)	Duke (20–3)	Duke (22–3)	Duke (24–3)	Wisconsin (26–3)	Wisconsin (28–3)	Duke (29–4)	Notre Dame (32-6)	5.
6.	North Carolina	North Carolina (2–0)	North Carolina (3–0)	Virginia (7–0)	Wisconsin (8–1)	Wisconsin (10–1)	Wisconsin (10–1)	Louisville (11–1)	Arizona (13–1)	Wisconsin (15–2)	Duke (15–2)	Arizona (18–2)	Arizona (20–2)	Villanova (21–2)	Villanova (23–2)	Villanova (25–2)	Arizona (26–3)	Arizona (28–3)	Virginia (29–3)	Gonzaga (35-3)	6.
7.	Florida	Florida (1–0)	Virginia (4–0)	Texas (6–0)	Villanova (8–0)	Villanova (10–0)	Villanova (11–0)	Arizona (12–1)	Gonzaga (14–1)	Louisville (14–2)	Arizona (16–2)	Villanova (18–2)	Villanova (19–2)	Arizona (20–3)	Arizona (22–3)	Arizona (24–3)	Gonzaga (29–2)	Gonzaga (30–2)	Gonzaga (32–2)	Michigan State (27-12)	7.
8.	Virginia	Louisville (1–0)	Gonzaga (4–0)	Gonzaga (6–0)	Gonzaga (7–1)	Gonzaga (9–1)	Gonzaga (11–1)	Gonzaga (12–1)	Villanova (13–1)	Utah (13–2)	Maryland (17–2)	Notre Dame (19–2)	Louisville (18–3)	Louisville (19–4)	Kansas (21–4)	Notre Dame (24–4)	Wichita State (27–3)	Maryland (26–5)	Notre Dame (29–5)	Virginia (30-4)	8.
9.	Louisville	Virginia (2–0)	Texas (4–0)	Villanova (6–0)	Texas (7–1)	Texas (8–1)	Texas (10–1)	Iowa State (9–1)	Maryland (14–1)	Arizona (14–2)	Notre Dame (17–2)	Louisville (17–3)	Kansas (18–3)	Kansas (19–4)	Utah (20–4)	Kansas (22–5)	Maryland (24–5)	Notre Dame (26–5)	Northern Iowa (30–3)	Villanova (33-3)	9.
10.	Texas	Texas (2–0)	Wichita State (3–0)	Wichita State (4–0)	Kansas (6–1)	Kansas (8–1)	Kansas (9–1)	Texas (10–2)	Texas (12–2)	Kansas (13–2)	Louisville (15–3)	Utah (16–3)	Notre Dame (20–3)	Utah (18–4)	Notre Dame (22–4)	Northern Iowa (26–2)	Kansas (23–6)	Kansas (24–7)	Iowa State (25–8)	Louisville (27-9)	10.
11.	Wichita State	Gonzaga (1–0)	Villanova (3–0)	Kansas (5–1)	Wichita State (5–1)	Wichita State (7–1)	Wichita State (8–1)	Maryland (12–1)	Utah (12–2)	Maryland (15–2)	Utah (14–3)	Kansas (16–3)	Utah (17–4)	Notre Dame (21–4)	Northern Iowa (24–2)	Wichita State (25–3)	Notre Dame (24–5)	Northern Iowa (30–3)	Kansas (26–8)	Wichita State (30-5)	11.
12.	Villanova	Villanova (1–0)	Kansas (1–1)	North Carolina (5–1)	Ohio State (6–1)	Ohio State (8–1)	Iowa State (9–1)	Utah (9–2)	Notre Dame (14–1)	Notre Dame (15–2)	Iowa State (13–3)	Wichita State (18–2)	West Virginia (18–3)	Northern Iowa (22–2)	Louisville (20–5)	Utah (21–5)	Northern Iowa (27–3)	Wichita State (28–4)	Maryland (27–6)	North Carolina (26-12)	12.
13.	Gonzaga	Wichita State (1–0)	Iowa State (2–0)	Ohio State (5–0)	Iowa State (5–1)	Iowa State (8–1)	Washington (10–0)	Notre Dame (12–1)	Kansas (11–2)	Iowa State (12–2)	Wichita State (16–2)	Maryland (18–3)	North Carolina (17–5)	Wichita State (21–3)	Wichita State (23–3)	Iowa State (20–6)	Utah (22–6)	Louisville (24–7)	Wichita State (28–4)	Oklahoma (24-11)	13.
14.	Iowa State	Iowa State (1–0)	VCU (3–0)	San Diego State (5–1)	Utah (6–1)	Utah (7–2)	Utah (8–2)	Kansas (9–2)	West Virginia (13–1)	Wichita State (14–2)	Kansas (14–3)	North Carolina (16–4)	Iowa State (16–4)	Iowa State (17–5)	Iowa State (18–6)	Maryland (22–5)	Louisville (23–6)	Oklahoma (21–9)	North Carolina (24–11)	Northern Iowa (31-4)	14.
15.	UConn	VCU (1–0)	San Diego State (3–0)	Miami (FL) (7–0)	Oklahoma (5–2)	Oklahoma (6–2)	Maryland (11–1)	West Virginia (11–1)	Wichita State (12–2)	West Virginia (14–2)	North Carolina (14–4)	VCU (16–3)	Northern Iowa (20–2)	North Carolina (18–6)	Maryland (21–5)	Louisville (21–6)	Oklahoma (20–8)	Iowa State (22–8)	Oklahoma (22–10)	Utah (26-9)	15.
16.	VCU	San Diego State (1–0)	Florida (2–1)	Michigan (5–1)	San Diego State (6–2)	Washington (8–0)	Notre Dame (11–1)	Wichita State (10–2)	Iowa State (10–2)	North Carolina (12–4)	VCU (15–3)	Iowa State (14–4)	Maryland (18–4)	Baylor (18–5)	North Carolina (18–7)	Arkansas (22–5)	Baylor (22–7)	Baylor (23–8)	Louisville (24–8)	Maryland (28-7)	16.
17.	San Diego State	UConn (1–0)	Ohio State (3–0)	West Virginia (7–0)	Washington (7–0)	San Diego State (7–2)	West Virginia (10–1)	St. John's (11–1)	North Carolina (11–3)	VCU (13–3)	West Virginia (15–3)	West Virginia (16–3)	Wichita State (19–3)	Oklahoma (16–7)	Arkansas (20–5)	Oklahoma (19–8)	Iowa State (20–8)	Utah (23–7)	Baylor (24–9)	Kansas (27-9)	17.
18.	Michigan State	Oklahoma (1–0)	Michigan (3–0)	Michigan State (5–2)	North Carolina (6–2)	Maryland (10–1)	Ohio State (9–2)	Ohio State (11–2)	Oklahoma (9–3)	Oklahoma (11–4)	Texas (13–4)	Northern Iowa (18–2)	VCU (17–4)	Butler (18–6)	Oklahoma (17–8)	North Carolina (19–8)	Arkansas (23–6)	West Virginia (23–8)	Utah (24–8)	West Virginia (25-10)	18.
19.	Oklahoma	Michigan State (1–0)	Michigan State (2–1)	Iowa State (3–1)	Butler (7–1)	Miami (FL) (9–1)	St. John's (9–1)	Washington (11–1)	Seton Hall (12–2)	Arkansas (13–2)	Northern Iowa (16–2)	Baylor (15–4)	Baylor (16–5)	Maryland (19–5)	Butler (18–7)	West Virginia (21–6)	North Carolina (20–9)	North Carolina (21–10)	SMU (27–6)	Iowa State (25-9)	19.
20.	Ohio State	Ohio State (1–0)	Miami (FL) (5–0)	Oklahoma (4–2)	Maryland (8–1)	West Virginia (9–1)	Oklahoma (7–3)	North Carolina (9–3)	Ohio State (12–3)	Texas (12–4)	Oklahoma (12–5)	Texas (14–5)	Ohio State (17–5)	West Virginia (18–5)	Baylor (18–7)	Baylor (20–7)	West Virginia (22–7)	Arkansas (24–7)	Arkansas (26–8)	Arkansas (27-9)	20.
21.	Nebraska	Nebraska (1–0)	Oklahoma (2–1)	Arkansas (6–0)	West Virginia (8–1) т	Notre Dame (10–1)	North Carolina (8–3)	Oklahoma (8–3)	VCU (11–3)	Seton Hall (13–3)	Baylor (13–4)	Indiana (15–5)	Oklahoma (14–7)	Ohio State (18–6)	SMU (21–5)	SMU (22–5)	Butler (21–8)	SMU (24–6)	West Virginia (23–9)	Baylor (24-10)	21.
22.	SMU	Michigan (1–0)	UConn (3–1)	Maryland (7–0)	Miami (FL) (8–1) т	Michigan State (7–3)	Baylor (9–1)	Baylor (10–1)	Baylor (11–2)	Northern Iowa (14–2)	Dayton (15–2)	Georgetown (14–5)	Butler (16–6)	VCU (18–5)	West Virginia (19–6)	San Diego State (22–6)	SMU (23–6)	Butler (22–9)	Michigan State (23–11)	Xavier (23-14)	22.
23.	Michigan	SMU (1–0)	UCLA (4–0)	UConn (3–2)	Michigan State (6–3)	St. John's (8–1)	San Diego State (8–3)	Northern Iowa (11–1)	Northern Iowa (12–2)	Baylor (12–3)	Indiana (14–4)	Miami (FL) (14–5)	SMU (18–4)	Arkansas (18–5)	Ohio State (19–7)	Butler (19–8)	Providence (20–9)	Georgetown (20–9)	Butler (22–10)	Butler (23-11)	23.
24.	Syracuse	Syracuse (2–0)	West Virginia (5–0)	Florida (3–3)	Northern Iowa (8–0)	North Carolina (6–3)	Northern Iowa (10–1)	Colorado State (13–0)	St. John's (11–3)	Oklahoma State (12–3)	Seton Hall (13–4)	Colorado State (18–2)	Georgetown (15–6)	Oklahoma State (16–7)	Oklahoma State (17–8)	VCU (21–6)	Murray State (26–4)	Davidson (23–6)	Georgetown (21–10)	NC State (22-14)	24.
25.	Iowa	Iowa (1–0)	Providence (5–0)	Illinois (6–0)	Illinois (7–1)	Butler (8–2)	Colorado State (11–0)	San Diego State (10–3)	Arkansas (11–2)	Ohio State (13–4)	Stanford (13–4)	Arkansas (15–4)	Indiana (16–6)	SMU (19–5)	San Diego State (20–6)	Michigan State (19–8)	Ohio State (21–8)	San Diego State (24–7)	Oregon (25–9)	Oregon (26-10)	25.
	Preseason Oct 16	Week 2 Nov 17	Week 3 Nov 24	Week 4 Dec 1	Week 5 Dec 8	Week 6 Dec 15	Week 7 Dec 22	Week 8 Dec 29	Week 9 Jan 5	Week 10 Jan 12	Week 11 Jan 19	Week 12 Jan 26	Week 13 Feb 2	Week 14 Feb 9	Week 15 Feb 16	Week 16 Feb 23	Week 17 Mar 2	Week 18 Mar 9	Week 19 Mar 16	Final Apr 7	
		None	Dropped: Nebraska (2–1); SMU (2–2); Syracuse (3–1); Iowa (2–2)	Dropped: VCU (4–2); UCLA (5–2); Providence (6–1)	Dropped: Michigan (6–2); Arkansas (6–2); UConn (3–3); Florida (3–4)	Dropped: Northern Iowa (9–1); Illinois (7–3)	Dropped: Miami (FL) (9–2); Michigan State (8–4); Butler (8–3)	None	Dropped: Washington (11–3); Colorado State (14–1); San Diego State (11–4)	Dropped: St. John's (11–4)	Dropped: Arkansas (13–4); Oklahoma St (12–5); Ohio State (14–5)	Dropped: Oklahoma (12–7); Dayton (16–3); Seton Hall (13–6); Stanford (14–5)	Dropped: Texas (14–7); Miami (FL) (14–7); Colorado State (19–3); Arkansas (16–5)	Dropped: Georgetown (15–8); Indiana (17–7)	Dropped: VCU (19–6)	Dropped: Ohio State (19–8); Oklahoma State (17–10)	Dropped: San Diego State (22–7); VCU (21–8); Michigan State (19–10)	Dropped: Providence (21–10); Murray State (27–5); Ohio State (22–9)	Dropped: Davidson (24–7); San Diego State (26–8)	Dropped: SMU (27-7) Georgetown (22-11)	

== See also ==
2014–15 NCAA Division I women's basketball rankings
