= 2014 Diamond Head Classic =

College basketball competition

- Season: 2014–15
- Teams: 8
- Finals site: Stan Sheriff Center; Honolulu, Hawaii
- Champions: George Washington (1st title)
- Runner-up: Wichita State (1st title game)
- Semifinalists: Colorado (1st semifinal); Hawai'i (2nd semifinal)
- MVP: Kevin Larsen (George Washington)

The 2014 Diamond Head Classic was a mid-season eight-team college basketball tournament played on December 22, 23, and 25 at the Stan Sheriff Center in Honolulu, Hawaii. It was the sixth annual Diamond Head Classic tournament and was part of the 2014–15 NCAA Division I men's basketball season. George Washington defeated No. 11-ranked Wichita State to with the tournament championship. Kevin Larsen was named the tournament's MVP.

== Bracket ==
5th Place Game; December 25
Ohio | 58
Nebraska | 71
7th Place Game; December 25
DePaul | 69
Loyola Marymount | 72

Consolation 2nd Round; December 23
Ohio | 99
DePaul | 78
Nebraska | 50
Loyola Marymount | 42

First Round; December 22
Ohio | 49
George Washington | 79
DePaul | 68
Colorado | 82
11 | Wichita State | 80
Loyola Marymount | 53
Nebraska | 56
Hawai'i | 66

Semifinals; December 23
George Washington | 53
Colorado | 50
11 | Wichita State | 80
Hawai'i | 79

Championship; December 25
George Washington | 60
11 | Wichita State | 54
3rd Place Game; December 25
Colorado | 66
Hawai'i | 69
