= 2014–15 Oklahoma Sooners men's basketball team =

American college basketball season

2014–15 Oklahoma Sooners men's basketball

NCAA tournament, Sweet Sixteen
- Conference: Big 12

Ranking
- Coaches: No. 13
- AP: No. 13
- Record: 24–11 (12–6 Big 12)
- Head coach: Lon Kruger (4th season)
- Assistant coaches: Steve Henson; Lew Hill; Chris Crutchfield
- Home arena: Lloyd Noble Center

2014–15 Big 12 men's basketball standings
	Conf.				Overall
Team	W		L	PCT	W		L	PCT
No. 10 Kansas	13	–	5	.722	27	–	9	.750
No. 9 Iowa State †	12	–	6	.667	25	–	9	.735
No. 13 Oklahoma	12	–	6	.667	24	–	11	.686
No. 16 Baylor	11	–	7	.611	24	–	10	.706
No. 20 West Virginia	11	–	7	.611	25	–	10	.714
Oklahoma State	8	–	10	.444	18	–	14	.563
Texas	8	–	10	.444	20	–	14	.588
Kansas State	8	–	10	.444	15	–	17	.469
TCU	4	–	14	.222	18	–	15	.545
Texas Tech	3	–	15	.167	13	–	19	.406
† 2015 Big 12 Tournament winner Rankings from AP poll

The 2014–15 Oklahoma Sooners basketball team represented the University of Oklahoma in the 2014–15 NCAA Division I men's basketball season. The Sooners were led by Lon Kruger in his fourth season. The team played its home games at the Lloyd Noble Center in Norman, Oklahoma as a member of the Big 12 Conference. They finished the season 24–11, 12–6 in Big 12 play to finish in a tie for second place. They advanced to the semifinals of the Big 12 tournament where they lost to Iowa State. They received an at-large bid to the NCAA tournament where they defeated Albany in the second round and Dayton in the third round to advance to the Sweet Sixteen where they lost to Michigan State.

== Previous season ==
The 2013–14 Oklahoma Sooners finished the season with an overall record of 23–10, with a record of 12–6 in the Big 12 play to finish in second place. In the 2014 Big 12 tournament, the Sooners were defeated by Baylor in the quarterfinals. They received an at-large bid to the NCAA tournament where they lost in the second round to North Dakota State.

== Preseason ==
=== Departures ===
Name	Number	Pos.	Height	Weight	Year	Hometown	Notes
Tyler Neal	15	F	6'7"	231	Senior	Oklahoma City, OK	Graduated
Cameron Clark	21	G	6'7"	209	Senior	Sherman, TX	Graduated
Je'lon Hornbeak	5	G	6'4"	186	Sophomore	Arlington, TX	Transferred to Monmouth

=== Incoming transfers ===
Name	Number	Pos.	Height	Weight	Year	Hometown	Previous School
Dinjiyl Walker	2	G	6'2"	195	Junior	Vaughan, ON	Junior college transfer from Iowa Western Community College.
TaShawn Thomas	35	F	6'8"	242	Senior	Killeen, TX	Transferred from Houston. Thomas was declared eligible by NCAA for the entire 2014-15 season on November 15, 2014.

=== Recruits ===
College recruiting information
Name	Hometown	School	Height	Weight	Commit date
Dante Buford; F	Jacksonville, FL	Arlington Country Day School	6 ft 7 in (2.01 m)	209 lb (95 kg)	Nov 7, 2013
Dante Buford; F	Recruit ratings: Scout: Rivals: 247Sports: ESPN:				
Khadeem Lattin; C	Houston, TX	Redemption Christian Homeschool Academy	6 ft 9 in (2.06 m)	190 lb (86 kg)	Oct 24, 2013
Khadeem Lattin; C	Recruit ratings: Scout: Rivals: 247Sports: ESPN:				
Jamuni McNeace; C	Allen, TX	Allen	6 ft 10 in (2.08 m)	200 lb (91 kg)	Oct 6, 2013
Jamuni McNeace; C	Recruit ratings: Scout: Rivals: 247Sports: ESPN:				
Bola Alade; G	Plano, TX	John Paul II	6 ft 5 in (1.96 m)	185 lb (84 kg)	Mar 4, 2014
Bola Alade; G	Recruit ratings: Scout: Rivals: 247Sports: ESPN:				
Overall recruit ranking:
Note: In many cases, Scout, Rivals, 247Sports, On3, and ESPN may conflict in their listings of height and weight.; In these cases, the average was taken. ESPN grades are on a 100-point scale.; Sources: "Oklahoma 2014 Basketball Commitments". Rivals.; "2014 Oklahoma Basketball Commits". Scout.; "ESPN". ESPN.; "Scout.com Team Recruiting Rankings". Scout.; "2014 Team Ranking". Rivals.

== Roster ==
2014–15 Oklahoma Sooners men's basketball team
Players
Coaches

Pos.	#	Name	Height	Weight	Year	Previous school	Hometown
F	00	Ryan Spangler	6 ft 8 in (2.03 m)	235 lb (107 kg)	RS Jr	Bridge Creek; Gonzaga	Bridge Creek, OK
G	1	Frank Booker Jr.	6 ft 4 in (1.93 m)	193 lb (88 kg)	So	Westside	Augusta, GA
G	2	Dinjiyl Walker	6 ft 1 in (1.85 m)	197 lb (89 kg)	Jr	Iowa Western CC	Vaughan, ON
C	4	Jamuni McNeace	6 ft 10 in (2.08 m)	202 lb (92 kg)	Fr	Allen	Allen, TX
G	10	Jordan Woodard	6 ft 0 in (1.83 m)	189 lb (86 kg)	So	Edmond Memorial	Arcadia, OK
G	11	Isaiah Cousins	6 ft 4 in (1.93 m)	192 lb (87 kg)	Jr	Mount Vernon	Mount Vernon, NY
F	12	Khadeem Lattin	6 ft 9 in (2.06 m)	201 lb (91 kg)	Fr	Redemption Christian Homeschool Acad.	Houston, TX
G	13	James Fraschilla	5 ft 10 in (1.78 m)	154 lb (70 kg)	Sr	Highland Park	Dallas, TX
G	14	Bola Alade	6 ft 4 in (1.93 m)	192 lb (87 kg)	Fr	John Paul II	Plano, TX
F	21	Dante Buford	6 ft 7 in (2.01 m)	205 lb (93 kg)	Fr	Arlington Country Day	Jacksonville, FL
G	22	Daniel Harper	6 ft 1 in (1.85 m)	182 lb (83 kg)	RS So	Norman	Norman, OK
G	24	Buddy Hield	6 ft 3 in (1.91 m)	212 lb (96 kg)	Jr	Sunrise Christian Academy	Freeport, Bahamas
F	25	C. J. Cole	6 ft 7 in (2.01 m)	235 lb (107 kg)	RS So	Sperry	Sperry, OK
F	31	D. J. Bennett	6 ft 8 in (2.03 m)	202 lb (92 kg)	RS Sr	Indian Hills CC	Chicago, IL
F	35	TaShawn Thomas	6 ft 8 in (2.03 m)	242 lb (110 kg)	Sr	Houston	Killen, TX
F	41	Austin Mankin	6 ft 7 in (2.01 m)	201 lb (91 kg)	So	Coppell	Coppell, TX
G	45	Trey Slate	6 ft 1 in (1.85 m)	205 lb (93 kg)	So	Gore	Gore, OK

Head coach

- Lon Kruger (Kansas State)

Assistant coach(es)

- Steve Henson (Kansas State)
- Lew Hill (Wichita State)
- Chris Crutchfield (Omaha)

Legend

- (C) Team captain
- (S) Suspended
- (I) Ineligible
- (W) Walk-on
- Injured
- Current redshirt

Roster

== Schedule ==
Date time, TV	Rank^{#}	Opponent^{#}	Result	Record	Site (attendance) city, state
Exhibition
11/07/2014*; 7:00 pm, SSTV	No. 19	Washburn	W 73–48		Lloyd Noble Center (13,023); Norman, OK
11/11/2014*; 7:00 pm, SSTV	No. 19	SW Oklahoma State	W 78–37		McCasland Field House (2,605); Norman, OK
Non-conference Regular Season
11/16/2014*; 2:00 pm, SSTV	No. 19	Southeastern Louisiana	W 78–53	1–0	Lloyd Noble Center (9,626); Norman, OK
11/19/2014*; 7:00 pm, FS1	No. 18	at Creighton	L 63–65	1–1	CenturyLink Center (17,393); Omaha, NE
11/23/2014*; 2:00 pm, SSTV	No. 18	Northwestern State	W 90–68	2–1	Lloyd Noble Center (10,056); Norman, OK
11/26/2014*; 1:30 pm, ESPN2		vs. No. 22 UCLA; Battle 4 Atlantis quarterfinals	W 75–65	3–1	Imperial Arena (2,174); Nassau, BAH
11/27/2014*; 12:00 pm, ESPN		vs. Butler; Battle 4 Atlantis semifinals	W 59–46	4–1	Imperial Arena (2,107); Nassau, BAH
11/28/2014*; 3:30 p.m., ESPN		vs. No. 2 Wisconsin; Battle 4 Atlantis championship	L 56–69	4–2	Imperial Arena (2,667); Nassau, BAH
12/05/2014*; 8:30 pm, ESPNU	No. 22	Missouri; Big 12/SEC Challenge	W 82–63	5–2	Lloyd Noble Center (11,652); Norman, OK
12/13/2014*; 1:30 pm, CBSSN	No. 16	at Tulsa	W 87–68	6–2	Reynolds Center (6,885); Tulsa, OK
12/16/2014*; 6:00 pm, ESPNU	No. 15	Oral Roberts	W 85–53	7–2	Lloyd Noble Center (9,713); Norman, OK
12/20/2014*; 8:00 pm, ESPNU	No. 15	vs. No. 16 Washington; MGM Grand Garden Showcase	L 67–69	7–3	MGM Grand Garden Arena (N/A); Paradise, NV
12/22/2014*; 7:00 pm, SSTV	No. 19	Weber State	W 85–51	8–3	Lloyd Noble Center (10,645); Norman, OK
12/31/2014*; 4:00 pm, SSTV	No. 18	George Mason	W 61–43	9–3	Lloyd Noble Center (10,597); Norman, OK
Big 12 Regular Season
01/03/2015; 3:00 pm, ESPNU	No. 18	No. 22 Baylor	W 73–63	10–3 (1–0)	Lloyd Noble Center (12,322); Norman, OK
01/05/2015; 8:00 pm, ESPN	No. 16	at No. 10 Texas	W 70–49	11–3 (2–0)	Frank Erwin Center (12,625); Austin, TX
01/10/2015; 6:00 pm, ESPNU	No. 16	Kansas State	L 63–66	11–4 (2–1)	Lloyd Noble Center (12,426); Norman, OK
01/13/2015; 6:00 pm, ESPNews	No. 18	at No. 16 West Virginia	L 65–86	11–5 (2–2)	WVU Coliseum (9,196); Morgantown, WV
01/17/2015; 6:00 pm, ESPN2	No. 18	No. 24 Oklahoma State; Bedlam Series	W 82–65	12–5 (3–2)	Lloyd Noble Center (12,730); Norman, OK
01/19/2015; 8:00 pm, ESPN	No. 19	at No. 11 Kansas	L 78–85	12–6 (3–3)	Allen Fieldhouse (16,300); Lawrence, KS
01/24/2015; 5:00 pm, ESPN2	No. 19	at No. 21 Baylor	L 58–69	12–7 (3–4)	Ferrell Center (8,753); Waco, TX
01/28/2015; 6:30 pm, ESPNews	No. 24	Texas Tech	W 81–36	13–7 (4–4)	Lloyd Noble Center (9,857); Norman, OK
01/31/2015; 7:00 pm, ESPN2	No. 24	at Oklahoma State; Bedlam Series	W 64–56	14–7 (5–4)	Gallagher-Iba Arena (13,611); Stillwater, OK
02/03/2015; 7:00 pm, ESPN2	No. 21	No. 15 West Virginia	W 71–52	15–7 (6–4)	Lloyd Noble Center (10,154); Norman, OK
02/07/2015; 2:00 pm, ESPNews	No. 21	at TCU	W 68–56	16–7 (7–4)	Wilkerson-Greines Activity Center (4,500); Fort Worth, TX
02/09/2015; 8:00 pm, ESPN	No. 17	No. 14 Iowa State	W 94–83	17–7 (8–4)	Lloyd Noble Center (11,099); Norman, OK
02/14/2015; 7:00 pm, ESPN2	No. 17	at Kansas State	L 56–59	17–8 (8–5)	Bramlage Coliseum (12,528); Manhattan, KS
02/17/2015; 8:00 pm, ESPN2	No. 17	Texas	W 71–69	18–8 (9–5)	Lloyd Noble Center (11,413); Norman, OK
02/21/2015; 11:00 am, ESPNews	No. 17	at Texas Tech	W 79–75 ^{OT}	19–8 (10–5)	United Supermarkets Arena (6,761); Lubbock, TX
02/28/2015; 1:00 pm, ESPNU	No. 16	TCU	W 67–60	20–8 (11–5)	Lloyd Noble Center (5,091); Norman, OK
03/02/2015; 8:00 pm, ESPN	No. 15	at No. 17 Iowa State	L 70–77	20–9 (11–6)	Hilton Coliseum (14,384); Ames, IA
03/07/2015; 3:00 pm, ESPN	No. 15	No. 9 Kansas	W 75–73	21–9 (12–6)	Lloyd Noble Center (12,104); Norman, OK
Big 12 Tournament
03/12/2015; 8:00 pm, ESPNU	No. 15	vs. Oklahoma State; Quarterfinals	W 64–49	22–9	Sprint Center (18,972); Kansas City, MO
03/13/2015; 8:00 pm, ESPN2	No. 15	vs. No. 13 Iowa State; Semifinals	L 65–67	22–10	Sprint Center (18,972); Kansas City, MO
NCAA tournament
03/20/2015*; 6:27 pm, truTV	No. 13 (3 E)	vs. (14 E) Albany; Second round	W 69–60	23–10	Nationwide Arena (17,584); Columbus, OH
03/22/2015*; 5:10 pm, TNT	No. 13 (3 E)	vs. (11 E) Dayton; Third round	W 72–66	24–10	Nationwide Arena (19,115); Columbus, OH
03/27/2015*; 9:07 pm, TBS	No. 13 (3 E)	vs. No. 23 (7 E) Michigan State; Sweet Sixteen	L 58–62	24–11	Carrier Dome (24,453); Syracuse, NY
*Non-conference game. ^{#}Rankings from AP Poll. (#) Tournament seedings in parentheses. All times are in Central Time. (#) during NCAA Tournament is seed within region E=East.

x- Sooner Sports Television (SSTV) is aired locally on Fox Sports. However the contract allows games to air on various affiliates. Those affiliates are FSSW, FSSW+, FSOK, FSOK+, and FCS Atlantic, Central, and Pacific.

== Rankings ==
Ranking movement Legend: ██ Increase in ranking. ██ Decrease in ranking. (RV) Received votes but unranked. (NR) Not ranked.
Poll	Pre	Wk 2	Wk 3	Wk 4	Wk 5	Wk 6	Wk 7	Wk 8	Wk 9	Wk 10	Wk 11	Wk 12	Wk 13	Wk 14	Wk 15	Wk 16	Wk 17	Wk 18	Wk 19	Final
AP	19	18	RV	22	16	15	19	18	16	18	19	24	21	17	17	16	15	15	13	n/a
Coaches	19	18	21	20	15	15	20	21	18	18	20	RV	21	17	17т	17	15	14	15	13
