= 2014–15 VCU Rams men's basketball team =

American college basketball season

2014–15 VCU Rams men's basketball

Atlantic 10 tournament champions

NCAA tournament, round of 64
- Conference: Atlantic 10 Conference

Ranking
- AP: No. 25
- Record: 26–10 (12–6 A10)
- Head coach: Shaka Smart (6th season)
- Assistant coaches: Jeremy Ballard; Mike Morell; David Cason
- Home arena: Stuart C. Siegel Center

2014–15 Atlantic 10 men's basketball standings
	Conf.				Overall
Team	W		L	PCT	W		L	PCT
Davidson	14	–	4	.778	24	–	8	.750
Dayton	13	–	5	.722	27	–	9	.750
Rhode Island	13	–	5	.722	23	–	10	.697
VCU †	12	–	6	.667	26	–	10	.722
Richmond	12	–	6	.667	21	–	14	.600
George Washington	10	–	8	.556	22	–	13	.629
St. Bonaventure	10	–	8	.556	18	–	13	.581
UMass	10	–	8	.556	17	–	15	.531
La Salle	8	–	10	.444	17	–	16	.515
Saint Joseph's	7	–	11	.389	13	–	18	.419
Duquesne	6	–	12	.333	12	–	19	.387
Fordham	4	–	14	.222	10	–	21	.323
George Mason	4	–	14	.222	9	–	22	.290
Saint Louis	3	–	15	.167	11	–	21	.344
† 2015 A10 tournament winner Rankings from AP poll

The 2014–15 VCU Rams men's basketball team represented Virginia Commonwealth University during the 2014–15 NCAA Division I men's basketball season. It was the 47th season of the university fielding a men's basketball program. Led by sixth-year head coach Shaka Smart, they continued to play their home games at the Stuart C. Siegel Center. They were a member of the Atlantic 10 Conference. They finished the season 26–10, 12–6 in A-10 play to finish in a tie for fourth place. They defeated Fordham, Richmond, Davidson, and Dayton to become champions of the Atlantic 10 tournament. They received an automatic bid to the NCAA tournament where they lost in the second round to Ohio State.

== Previous season ==
The 2013–14 VCU Rams finished the season with an overall record of 26–9, with a record of 12–4 in the Atlantic 10 regular season for second-place finish. In the 2014 Atlantic 10 tournament, the Rams were defeated by Saint Joseph's, 65–61 in the championship game. They were invited to the 2014 NCAA Division I men's basketball tournament which they lost in the second round to Stephen F. Austin.

== Off season ==
=== Departures ===
Name	Number	Pos.	Height	Weight	Year	Hometown	Notes
Terrance Shannon	5	F	6'8"	240	RS Senior	Forsyth, GA	Graduated
Rob Brandenberg	11	G	6'2"	190	Senior	Gahanna, OH	Graduated
Juvonte Reddic	15	F	6'9"	250	Senior	Winston-Salem, NC	Graduated

== 2014–15 incoming team members ==
=== 2014–15 team recruits ===
College recruiting information
Name	Hometown	School	Height	Weight	Commit date
Terry Larrier; SF	Bronx, NY	The Phelps School	6 ft 7 in (2.01 m)	200 lb (91 kg)	Sep 6, 2013
Terry Larrier; SF	Recruit ratings: Scout: Rivals: (87)				
Michael Gilmore; PF	Jacksonville, FL	James S. Rickards High School	6 ft 9 in (2.06 m)	210 lb (95 kg)	Sep 26, 2013
Michael Gilmore; PF	Recruit ratings: Scout: Rivals: (83)				
Justin Tillman; PF	Redford, MI	Pershing High School	6 ft 8 in (2.03 m)	175 lb (79 kg)	Aug 30, 2013
Justin Tillman; PF	Recruit ratings: Scout: Rivals: (80)				
Jonathan Williams; PG	Newark, N.J.	Saint Benedict's Prep	5 ft 11 in (1.80 m)	170 lb (77 kg)	Mar 2, 2013
Jonathan Williams; PG	Recruit ratings: Scout: Rivals: (78)				
Overall recruit ranking:
Note: In many cases, Scout, Rivals, 247Sports, On3, and ESPN may conflict in their listings of height and weight.; In these cases, the average was taken. ESPN grades are on a 100-point scale.; Sources: "2014 Team Ranking". Rivals.

== Roster ==
2014–15 VCU Rams men's basketball team
Players
Coaches

Pos.	#	Name	Height	Weight	Year	Hometown
G	1	JeQuan Lewis	6 ft 1 in (1.85 m)	175 lb (79 kg)	So	Dickson, TN
G	2	Brianté Weber (injured)	6 ft 2 in (1.88 m)	165 lb (75 kg)	Sr	Chesapeake, VA
F	4	Justin Tillman	6 ft 7 in (2.01 m)	190 lb (86 kg)	Fr	Redford, MI
G	5	Doug Brooks	6 ft 3 in (1.91 m)	180 lb (82 kg)	So	Lake Wales, FL
G	10	Jonathan Williams	6 ft 0 in (1.83 m)	170 lb (77 kg)	Fr	Newark, NJ
F	11	Michael Gilmore	6 ft 9 in (2.06 m)	205 lb (93 kg)	Fr	Tallahassee, FL
F	12	Mo Alie-Cox	6 ft 6 in (1.98 m)	250 lb (113 kg)	RS So	Middleburg, VA
G	14	Torey Burston	5 ft 8 in (1.73 m)	165 lb (75 kg)	RS So	Richmond, VA
G	20	Jordan Burgess	6 ft 5 in (1.96 m)	215 lb (98 kg)	RS So	Midlothian, VA
G/F	21	Treveon Graham	6 ft 6 in (1.98 m)	220 lb (100 kg)	Sr	Washington, D.C.
G/F	22	Terry Larrier	6 ft 7 in (2.01 m)	200 lb (91 kg)	Fr	Bronx, NY
F	23	Jarred Guest	6 ft 8 in (2.03 m)	225 lb (102 kg)	Sr	Columbia, SC
F	25	Antravious Simmons	6 ft 9 in (2.06 m)	250 lb (113 kg)	RS Fr	Miami, FL
G	32	Melvin Johnson	6 ft 3 in (1.91 m)	195 lb (88 kg)	Jr	Bronx, NY

Head coach

- Shaka Smart (Kenyon)

Assistant coach(es)

- Mike Rhoades (Lebanon Valley)
- Jeremy Ballard (Colgate)
- Mike Morell (Milligan)

Legend

- (C) Team captain
- (S) Suspended
- (I) Ineligible
- (W) Walk-on
- Injured
- Current redshirt

Roster

== Schedule ==
Date time, TV	Rank^{#}	Opponent^{#}	Result	Record	Site (attendance) city, state
Exhibition
November 7*; 7:00 pm	No. 15	California (PA)	W 92–43		Siegel Center (7,741); Richmond, VA
Non-conference regular season
November 14*; 6:30 pm, CBSSN	No. 15	vs. Tennessee; Veterans Classic	W 85–69	1–0	Alumni Hall (5,699); Annapolis, MD
November 18*; 6:00 pm, ESPNU	No. 15	Toledo; Legends Classic	W 87–78	2–0	Siegel Center (7,637); Richmond, VA
November 20*; 7:00 pm, WTVR	No. 15	Maryland Eastern Shore; Legends Classic	W 106–66	3–0	Siegel Center (7,637); Richmond, VA
November 24*; 7:00 pm, ESPN2	No. 14	vs. No. 12 Villanova; Legends Classic semifinals	L 53–77	3–1	Barclays Center (8,465); Brooklyn, NY
November 25*; 7:30 pm, ESPNU	No. 14	vs. Oregon; Legends Classic 3rd place game	W 77–63	4–1	Barclays Center (8,093); Brooklyn, NY
November 29*; 7:00 pm, CSN+	No. 14	at Old Dominion; Rivalry	L 67–73	4–2	Ted Constant Convocation Center (8,472); Norfolk, VA
December 2*; 8:00 pm, CSN+		at Illinois State	W 66–62	5–2	Redbird Arena (7,142); Normal, IL
December 6*; 2:00 pm, ESPNU		No. 7 Virginia	L 57–74	5–3	Siegel Center (7,647); Richmond, VA
December 13*; 7:00 pm, NBCSN		No. 23 Northern Iowa	W 93–87 ^{2OT}	6–3	Siegel Center (7,637); Richmond, VA
December 16*; 7:00 pm, MASN		Belmont	W 78–51	7–3	Siegel Center (N/A); Richmond, VA
December 20*; 12:00 pm, ESPNU		at Cincinnati	W 68–47	8–3	Fifth Third Arena (9,520); Cincinnati, OH
December 22*; 7:00 pm, CSN+		East Tennessee State	W 84–60	9–3	Siegel Center (7,637); Richmond, VA
December 29*; 7:00 pm, WTVR		Cleveland State	W 72–63	10–3	Siegel Center (7,637); Richmond, VA
Atlantic 10 regular season
January 4; 1:00 pm, CBSSN		at Fordham	W 75–58	11–3 (1–0)	Rose Hill Gymnasium (2,719); Bronx, NY
January 7; 7:00 pm, MASN	No. 20	Davidson	W 71–65	12–3 (2–0)	Siegel Center (7,637); Richmond, VA
January 10; 2:00 pm, CBSSN	No. 20	Saint Joseph's	W 89–74	13–3 (3–0)	Siegel Center (7,637); Richmond, VA
January 13; 7:30 pm, CBSSN	No. 17	at Rhode Island	W 65–60	14–3 (4–0)	Ryan Center (6,011); Kingston, RI
January 17; 2:00 pm, CBSSN	No. 17	at Duquesne	W 70–64	15–3 (5–0)	Consol Energy Center (4,223); Pittsburgh, PA
January 23; 7:00 pm, ESPN2	No. 16	at Saint Louis	W 63–61	16–3 (6–0)	Chaifetz Arena (9,643); St. Louis, MO
January 27; 7:00 pm, CBSSN	No. 14	George Washington	W 72–48	17–3 (7–0)	Siegel Center (7,637); Richmond, VA
January 31; 2:00 pm, ESPN2	No. 14	Richmond; Black & Blue Classic	L 55–64	17–4 (7–1)	Siegel Center (7,637); Richmond, VA
February 4; 7:00 pm, CBSSN	No. 18	at George Mason; Rivalry	W 72–60	18–4 (8–1)	Patriot Center (6,743); Fairfax, VA
February 7; 2:00 pm, NBCSN	No. 18	at St. Bonaventure	L 71–73	18–5 (8–2)	Reilly Center (5,135); Olean, NY
February 11; 7:00 pm, CBSSN	No. 20	at La Salle	L 69–74 ^{2OT}	18–6 (8–3)	Siegel Center (7,637); Richmond, VA
February 14; 2:00 pm, ESPN2	No. 20	at George Washington	W 79–66	19–6 (9–3)	Charles E. Smith Center (4,816); Washington, D.C.
February 17; 7:30 pm, CBSSN	No. 25	Saint Louis	W 74–54	20–6 (10–3)	Siegel Center (7,637); Richmond, VA
February 21; 12:00 pm, ESPN2	No. 25	Massachusetts	W 78–72	21–6 (11–3)	Siegel Center (7,637); Richmond, VA
February 25; 7:00 pm, ESPN2	No. 22	at Richmond; Black & Blue Classic	L 63–67 ^{2OT}	21–7 (11–4)	Robins Center (7,201); Richmond, VA
February 28; 2:00 pm, ESPN2	No. 22	Dayton	L 55–59	21–8 (11–5)	Siegel Center (7,637); Richmond, VA
March 5; 9:00 pm, ESPNU		at Davidson	L 55–82	21–9 (11–6)	John M. Belk Arena (5,223); Davidson, NC
March 7; 5:30 pm, NBCSN		George Mason; Rivalry	W 71–60	22–9 (12–6)	Siegel Center (7,637); Richmond, VA
Atlantic 10 Tournament
March 12; 2:30 pm, NBCSN		vs. Fordham; Second Round	W 63–57	23–9	Barclays Center (6,806); Brooklyn, NY
March 13; 3:00 pm, NBCSN		vs. Richmond; Quarterfinals	W 70–67	24–9	Barclays Center (6,809); Brooklyn, NY
March 14; 1:30 pm, CBSSN		vs. No. 24 Davidson; Semifinals	W 93–73	25–9	Barclays Center (8,488); Brooklyn, NY
March 15; 1:00 pm, CBS		vs. Dayton; Championship game	W 71–65	26–9	Barclays Center (7,685); Brooklyn, NY
NCAA tournament
March 19*; 4:40 pm, TNT	(7 W) No. 25	vs. (10 W) Ohio State; Second round	L 72–75 ^{OT}	26–10	Moda Center (13,616); Portland, OR
*Non-conference game. ^{#}Rankings from AP poll. (#) Tournament seedings in parentheses. All times are in Eastern Time. (#) during NCAA Tournament is seed with Region W=West.

== Rankings ==
Ranking movement Legend: ██ Increase in ranking. ██ Decrease in ranking. ██ Not ranked the previous week.
Poll	Pre	Wk 2	Wk 3	Wk 4	Wk 5	Wk 6	Wk 7	Wk 8	Wk 9	Wk 10	Wk 11	Wk 12	Wk 13	Wk 14	Wk 15	Wk 16	Wk 17	Wk 18	Wk 19	Final
AP	15	15	14	N/A	N/A	N/A	N/A	N/A	20	17	16	14	18	20	25	22	N/A	N/A	25	N/A
Coaches'	16	15	14	N/A	N/A	N/A	N/A	N/A	21	17	16	15	18	22	N/A	24	N/A	N/A	N/A	N/A
