= 2014–15 Dayton Flyers men's basketball team =

American college basketball season

2014–15 Dayton Flyers men's basketball

NCAA tournament, Round of 32
- Conference: Atlantic 10 Conference
- Record: 27–9 (13–5 A-10)
- Head coach: Archie Miller (4th season)
- Assistant coaches: Kevin Kuwik; Allen Griffin; Tom Ostrom
- Home arena: University of Dayton Arena

2014–15 Atlantic 10 men's basketball standings
	Conf.				Overall
Team	W		L	PCT	W		L	PCT
Davidson	14	–	4	.778	24	–	8	.750
Dayton	13	–	5	.722	27	–	9	.750
Rhode Island	13	–	5	.722	23	–	10	.697
VCU †	12	–	6	.667	26	–	10	.722
Richmond	12	–	6	.667	21	–	14	.600
George Washington	10	–	8	.556	22	–	13	.629
St. Bonaventure	10	–	8	.556	18	–	13	.581
UMass	10	–	8	.556	17	–	15	.531
La Salle	8	–	10	.444	17	–	16	.515
Saint Joseph's	7	–	11	.389	13	–	18	.419
Duquesne	6	–	12	.333	12	–	19	.387
Fordham	4	–	14	.222	10	–	21	.323
George Mason	4	–	14	.222	9	–	22	.290
Saint Louis	3	–	15	.167	11	–	21	.344
† 2015 A10 tournament winner Rankings from AP poll

The 2014–15 Dayton Flyers men's basketball team represented the University of Dayton during the 2014–15 NCAA Division I men's basketball season. The Flyers, led by fourth year head coach Archie Miller, played their home games at the University of Dayton Arena and were members of the Atlantic 10 Conference. They finished the season 27–9, 13–5 in A-10 play to finish in a tie for second place. They advanced to the championship game of the A-10 tournament where they lost to VCU. They received an at-large bid to the NCAA tournament where they defeated Boise State in the First Four and Providence in the second round before losing in the third round to Oklahoma.

When the Flyers were selected to play at home in the First Four, they became the first team since 1987 to play an NCAA Tournament game in their home arena. The NCAA made a rule in 1989 that no team could play a tournament game in their home arena. However, with UD Arena always hosting the First Four, Dayton is the only exception to the rule.

== Previous season ==
The 2013–14 Dayton Flyers finished the season with an overall record of 26–11, with a record of 10–6 in the Atlantic 10 regular season for a tie for a fifth-place finish. In the 2014 Atlantic 10 tournament, the Flyers were defeated by Saint Joseph's, 70–67 in the quarterfinals. They received an at-large bid to the 2014 NCAA Division I men's basketball tournament, where they upset Ohio State, Syracuse and Stanford in second and third rounds and the sweet sixteen before falling to Florida in the elite eight to end their Cinderella run.

== Offseason ==
=== Departures ===
Name	Number	Pos.	Height	Weight	Year	Hometown	Notes
Khari Price	0	G	5'11"	170	Sophomore	Slidell, LA	Transferred to Southern Miss
Devin Oliver	5	F	6'7"	225	Senior	Kalamazoo, MI	Graduated
Brian Vonderhaar	23	G	6'0"	170	RS Senior	Cincinnati, OH	Graduated
Alex Gavrilovic	25	F	6'9"	246	Junior	Strasbourg, France	Graduate transferred to Towson
Matt Kavanaugh	35	C	6'10"	250	RS Senior	Ottawa, ON	Graduated
Vee Sanford	43	G	6'4"	225	RS Senior	Lexington, KY	Graduated

=== Incoming transfers ===
Name	Number	Pos.	Height	Weight	Year	Hometown	Previous School
Charles Cooke	14	G	6'6"	190	Junior	Trenton, NJ	Transferred from James Madison. Under NCAA transfer rules, Cooke will have to redshirt from the 2014–15 season. Will have two years of remaining eligibility.
Detwon Rogers	30	F	6'6"	225	Junior	Raleigh, NC	Junior college transfer from College of Southern Idaho.

== Incoming recruits ==
College recruiting information
Name	Hometown	School	Height	Weight	Commit date
Darrell Davis; SG	Detroit, MI	Douglass Academy for Young Men	6 ft 4 in (1.93 m)	170 lb (77 kg)	Sep 8, 2013
Darrell Davis; SG	Recruit ratings: Scout: Rivals: 247Sports: ESPN:				
Steve McElvene; C	New Haven, IN	New Haven High School	6 ft 11 in (2.11 m)	285 lb (129 kg)	Sep 13, 2013
Steve McElvene; C	Recruit ratings: Scout: Rivals: ESPN:				
Overall recruit ranking:
Note: In many cases, Scout, Rivals, 247Sports, On3, and ESPN may conflict in their listings of height and weight.; In these cases, the average was taken. ESPN grades are on a 100-point scale.; Sources: "2014 Team Ranking". Rivals.

== Season synopsis ==
The Flyers entered the season with three players capable of playing as centers, but by the start of 2015, none of the three were available to the team. First, the NCAA declared incoming freshman Steve McElvene a "partial qualifier", rendering him ineligible for the entire 2014–15 season. Then, in December 2014, starting center Devon Scott and intended backup Jalen Robinson were dismissed from the team after allegedly being caught committing theft in a campus dormitory. Two other players were sidelined by injuries. Junior college transfer Detwon Rogers was lost for the season to a knee injury, and graduate transfer Ryan Bass quit basketball on medical advice due to post-concussion symptoms.

These departures and injuries left Dayton with arguably the most limited roster, in both depth and physical size, in Division I. The Flyers played the bulk of their season with only six players who started the season on scholarships. In January 2015, Bobby Wehrli, who had begun the season as a walk-on, was given a scholarship, but only for the spring of 2015. No one left on the active roster, whether on scholarship or not, was taller than 6'6" (1.98 m). CBS Sports journalist Gary Parrish had this to say about the Flyers' roster limitations (emphasis in original):

"To put this into perspective, consider that Kentucky has seven scholarship players taller than 6-8, and that UK's starting backcourt (Andrew Harrison and Aaron Harrison) is just as tall as Dayton's starting frontcourt (Dyshawn Pierre and Kendall Pollard)."

Despite these limitations, the Flyers remained in contention for the A10 title for most of the season, ultimately finishing second in the regular-season standings, and advanced to the A10 tournament final, losing there to VCU.

== Roster ==
2014–15 Dayton Flyers men's basketball team
Players
Coaches

Pos.	#	Name	Height	Weight	Year	Previous school	Hometown
G	1	Darrell Davis	6 ft 4 in (1.93 m)	155 lb (70 kg)	Fr	Douglass Academy	Detroit, MI
G	3	Kyle Davis	6 ft 0 in (1.83 m)	165 lb (75 kg)	So	Morgan Park	Chicago, IL
C	5	Steve McElvene (redshirt)	6 ft 11 in (2.11 m)	260 lb (118 kg)	Fr	New Haven	New Haven, IN
G	11	Scoochie Smith	6 ft 2 in (1.88 m)	170 lb (77 kg)	So	Putnam Science Academy	New York, NY
F/C	12	Jalen Robinson (S)	6 ft 9 in (2.06 m)	243 lb (110 kg)	Jr	Northland	Columbus, OH
G	14	Jeremiah Bonsu (W)	5 ft 11 in (1.8 m)	150 lb (68 kg)	So	Pickerington North	Pickerington, OH
G	15	Nick Haldes (W)	6 ft 3 in (1.91 m)	185 lb (84 kg)	Fr	Mattawan	Chicago, IL
F	21	Dyshawn Pierre	6 ft 6 in (1.98 m)	210 lb (95 kg)	Jr	Anderson CVI	Whitby, ON
G	24	Jordan Sibert	6 ft 4 in (1.93 m)	187 lb (85 kg)	RS Sr	Princeton	Cincinnati, OH
F	25	Kendall Pollard	6 ft 6 in (1.98 m)	210 lb (95 kg)	So	Simeon Career Academy	Chicago, IL
F	30	Detwon Rogers (injured) (redshirt)	6 ft 6 in (1.98 m)	220 lb (100 kg)	Jr	New Hanover; College of Southern Idaho	Raleigh, NC
F/C	40	Devon Scott (S)	6 ft 9 in (2.06 m)	215 lb (98 kg)	Jr	Northland	Columbus, OH
G	44	Joey Gruden (W)	6 ft 2 in (1.88 m)	163 lb (74 kg)	So	Sycamore	Leesburg, VA
F	50	Bobby Wehrli	6 ft 6 in (1.98 m)	198 lb (90 kg)	Jr	Benet Academy	Naperville, IL
G	51	William Dupuy (W)	5 ft 8 in (1.73 m)	157 lb (71 kg)	So	Grapevine	Colleyville, TX
G	–	Charles Cooke (I) (redshirt)	6 ft 5 in (1.96 m)	192 lb (87 kg)	Jr	Trenton Catholic Academy; James Madison	Trenton, NJ

Head coach

- Archie Miller (NC State)

Assistant coach(es)

- Kevin Kuwik (Notre Dame)
- Allen Griffin (Syracuse)
- Tom Ostrom (Minnesota)

Legend

- (C) Team captain
- (S) Suspended
- (I) Ineligible
- (W) Walk-on
- Injured
- Current redshirt

Roster

== Schedule ==
Date time, TV	Rank^{#}	Opponent^{#}	Result	Record	Site (attendance) city, state
Exhibition
11/08/2014*; 7:00 pm		Southern Indiana	W 96–66	–	UD Arena (11,753); Dayton, OH
Non-conference regular season
11/14/2014*; 7:00 pm, WHIO		Alabama A&M	W 76–52	1–0	UD Arena (12,732); Dayton, OH
11/20/2014*; 10:30 am, ESPNU		vs. Texas A&M; Puerto Rico Tip-Off Quarterfinals	W 55–53	2–0	Roberto Clemente Coliseum (6,723); San Juan, PR
11/21/2014*; 2:30 pm, ESPN2		vs. No. 17 UConn; Puerto Rico Tip-Off Semifinals	L 64–75	2–1	Roberto Clemente Coliseum (7,438); San Juan, PR
11/23/2014*; 4:30 pm, ESPN2		vs. Boston College; Puerto Rico Tip-Off 3rd Place Game	W 65–53	3–1	Roberto Clemente Coliseum (8,002); San Juan, PR
11/29/2014*; 2:00 pm, FSOH		UIC	W 75–41	4–1	UD Arena (11,835); Dayton, OH
12/03/2014*; 7:00 pm		at Miami (OH)	W 66–62	5–1	Millett Hall (2,365); Oxford, OH
12/06/2014*; 2:00 pm, FSOH		Eastern Michigan	W 73–64	6–1	UD Arena (12,243); Dayton, OH
12/09/2014*; 7:00 pm, TWCSC		Bowling Green	W 56–52	7–1	UD Arena (12,105); Dayton, OH
12/13/2014*; 2:00 pm, ESPN2		at Arkansas	L 55–69	7–2	Bud Walton Arena (15,313); Fayetteville, AR
12/20/2014*; 7:00 pm, TWCSC		Boston University	W 78–62	8–2	UD Arena (12,326); Dayton, OH
12/23/2014*; 8:00 pm, CBSSN		Georgia Tech	W 75–61	9–2	UD Arena (12,424); Dayton, OH
12/30/2014*; 8:00 pm, CBSSN		Ole Miss	W 78–74	10–2	UD Arena (12,525); Dayton, OH
Atlantic 10 regular season
01/03/2015; 1:00 pm, NBCSN		Duquesne	W 81–55	11–2 (1–0)	UD Arena (12,319); Dayton, OH
01/08/2015; 7:00 pm, CBSSN		at St. Bonaventure	W 78–61	12–2 (2–0)	Reilly Center (3,495); Olean, NY
01/10/2015; 7:00 pm		at Fordham	W 76–58	13–2 (3–0)	Rose Hill Gymnasium (2,872); Bronx, NY
01/14/2015; 7:00 pm, WHIO		La Salle	W 61–50	14–2 (4–0)	UD Arena (12,300); Dayton, OH
01/17/2015; 12:30 pm, NBCSN		Saint Louis	W 61–45	15–2 (5–0)	UD Arena (13,455); Dayton, OH
01/20/2015; 7:30 pm, CBSSN	No. 22	at Davidson	L 60–77	15–3 (5–1)	John M. Belk Arena (5,067); Davidson, NC
01/24/2015; 7:00 pm, SNY/WHIO	No. 22	Richmond	W 63–60	16–3 (6–1)	UD Arena (13,455); Dayton, OH
01/29/2015; 7:00 pm, ESPNU		at Massachusetts	L 64–66	16–4 (6–2)	Mullins Center (5,633); Amherst, MA
02/01/2015; 2:00 pm, FSOH		Fordham	W 101–77	17–4 (7–2)	UD Arena (13,106); Dayton, OH
02/06/2015; 7:00 pm, ESPN2		at George Washington	L 64–65	17–5 (7–3)	Charles E. Smith Center (4,579); Washington, D.C.
02/10/2015; 9:30 pm, CBSSN		at Saint Louis	W 51–44	18–5 (8–3)	Chaifetz Arena (8,093); St. Louis, MO
02/14/2015; 12:30 pm, NBCSN		St. Bonaventure	W 75–61	19–5 (9–3)	UD Arena (13,455); Dayton, OH
02/19/2015; 6:00 pm, ESPNU		Saint Joseph's	W 68–64	20–5 (10–3)	UD Arena (13,015); Dayton, OH
02/21/2015; 2:00 pm, NBCSN		at Duquesne	L 73–83	20–6 (10–4)	Consol Energy Center (5,227); Pittsburgh, PA
02/25/2015; 7:00 pm, WHIO		George Mason	W 76–63	21–6 (11–4)	UD Arena (12,861); Dayton, OH
02/28/2015; 2:00 pm, ESPN2		at No. 22 VCU	W 59–55	22–6 (12–4)	Siegel Center (7,637); Richmond, VA
03/03/2015; 7:00 pm, CBSSN		Rhode Island	W 75–59	23–6 (13–4)	UD Arena (13,455); Dayton, OH
03/07/2015; 6:00 pm, CBSSN		at La Salle	L 53–55	23–7 (13–5)	Tom Gola Arena (2,305); Philadelphia, PA
Atlantic 10 tournament
03/13/2015; 6:30 pm, NBCSN		vs. St. Bonaventure; Quarterfinals	W 75–71	24–7	Barclays Center (7,423); Brooklyn, NY
03/14/2015; 4:00 pm, CBSSN		vs. Rhode Island; Semifinals	W 56–52	25–7	Barclays Center (8,488); Brooklyn, NY
03/15/2015; 1:00 pm, CBS		vs. VCU; Championship game	L 65–71	25–8	Barclays Center (7,685); Brooklyn, NY
NCAA tournament
03/18/2015*; 9:10 pm, truTV	(11 E)	(11 E) Boise State; First Four	W 56–55	26–8	UD Arena (12,592); Dayton, OH
03/20/2015*; 9:57 pm, truTV	(11 E)	vs. (6 E) Providence; Second round	W 66–53	27–8	Nationwide Arena (17,584); Columbus, OH
03/22/2015*; 6:10 pm, TNT	(11 E)	vs. (3 E) No. 13 Oklahoma; Third round	L 66–72	27–9	Nationwide Arena (19,115); Columbus, OH
*Non-conference game. ^{#}Rankings from AP Poll. (#) Tournament seedings in parentheses. E=East Region. All times are in Eastern Time.

== Rankings ==
Ranking movement Legend: ██ Improvement in ranking. ██ Decrease in ranking. RV=Others receiving votes.
Poll	Pre	Wk 2	Wk 3	Wk 4	Wk 5	Wk 6	Wk 7	Wk 8	Wk 9	Wk 10	Wk 11	Wk 12	Wk 13	Wk 14	Wk 15	Wk 16	Wk 17	Wk 18	Wk 19	Final
AP	RV	RV	RV	NR	RV	NR	NR	NR	RV	RV	22	RV	RV	NR	RV	NR	RV	RV	RV	N/A
Coaches	RV	RV	NR	NR	NR	NR	NR	NR	RV	RV	22	RV	RV	RV	RV	NR	RV	RV	RV	RV

== See also ==
2014–15 Dayton Flyers women's basketball team
