= 2015 NCAA Division I men's basketball tournament =

Edition of USA college basketball tournament

- Season: 2014–15
- Teams: 68
- Finals site: Lucas Oil Stadium, Indianapolis, Indiana
- Champions: Duke Blue Devils (5th title, 11th title game, 16th Final Four)
- Runner-up: Wisconsin Badgers (2nd title game, 4th Final Four)
- Semifinalists: Kentucky Wildcats (17th Final Four); Michigan State Spartans (9th Final Four)
- Winning coach: Mike Krzyzewski (5th title)
- MOP: Tyus Jones (Duke)

The 2015 NCAA Division I men's basketball tournament involved 68 teams playing in a single-elimination tournament that determined the National Collegiate Athletic Association (NCAA) Division I men's basketball national champion for the 2014–15 season. The 77th edition of the tournament began on March 17, 2015, and concluded with the championship game on April 6, at Lucas Oil Stadium in Indianapolis, Indiana.

The Final Four consisted of Kentucky (who went in undefeated at 38–0), Wisconsin, making their second consecutive trip to the Final Four, Michigan State, making their first Final Four since 2010 (also held in Indianapolis) and the 7th under head coach Tom Izzo, and Duke, making their first appearance since their 2010 national championship. Duke defeated Wisconsin in the championship game, 68–63, clinching their 5th national championship under Mike Krzyzewski. Tyus Jones of Duke was the tournament's Most Outstanding Player.

Unlike the past three tournaments, this tournament featured fewer upsets, with 7. However, for the first time since the 1995 tournament, two of the No. 14 seeds won in the same tournament. In the West Region, #14 Georgia State of the Sun Belt Conference defeated #3 Baylor. In the South Region, #14 UAB of Conference USA defeated #3 Iowa State.

Three teams made their NCAA tournament debuts, North Florida from the Atlantic Sun Conference (ASUN), UC Irvine from the Big West Conference (BWC), and Buffalo from the Mid-American Conference (MAC).

== Schedule and venues ==
2015 First Four (orange) and first and second rounds March 19 and 21 (green) March 20 and 22 (Blue)
2015 Regionals (blue) and Final Four (red)

The following are the sites selected to host each round of the 2015 tournament:

First Four

- March 17 and 18
  - University of Dayton Arena, Dayton, Ohio (Host: University of Dayton)

First and Second rounds (round of 64 and round of 32)

- March 19 and 21
  - Jacksonville Veterans Memorial Arena, Jacksonville, Florida (Hosts: Jacksonville University, University of North Florida)
  - KFC Yum! Center, Louisville, Kentucky (Host: University of Louisville)
  - Consol Energy Center, Pittsburgh, Pennsylvania (Host: Duquesne University)
  - Moda Center, Portland, Oregon (Host: University of Oregon)
- March 20 and 22
  - Time Warner Cable Arena, Charlotte, North Carolina (Host: University of North Carolina at Charlotte)
  - Nationwide Arena, Columbus, Ohio (Host: Ohio State University)
  - CenturyLink Center Omaha, Omaha, Nebraska (Host: Creighton University)
  - KeyArena, Seattle, Washington (Host: University of Washington)

Regional semifinals and Finals (Sweet Sixteen and Elite Eight)

- March 26 and 28
  - Midwest Regional, Quicken Loans Arena, Cleveland, Ohio (Hosts: Cleveland State University, Mid-American Conference)
  - West Regional, Staples Center, Los Angeles (Host: Pepperdine University)
- March 27 and 29
  - East Regional, Carrier Dome, Syracuse, New York (Host: Syracuse University)
  - South Regional, NRG Stadium, Houston, Texas (Hosts: University of Houston, Rice University)

National semifinals and championship (Final Four and championship)

- April 4 and 6
  - Lucas Oil Stadium, Indianapolis, Indiana (Hosts: IUPUI, Horizon League)

Indianapolis hosted the Final Four for the seventh time, having previously hosted in 2010, and also the second Final Four at Lucas Oil Stadium.

== Qualifying and selection procedure ==
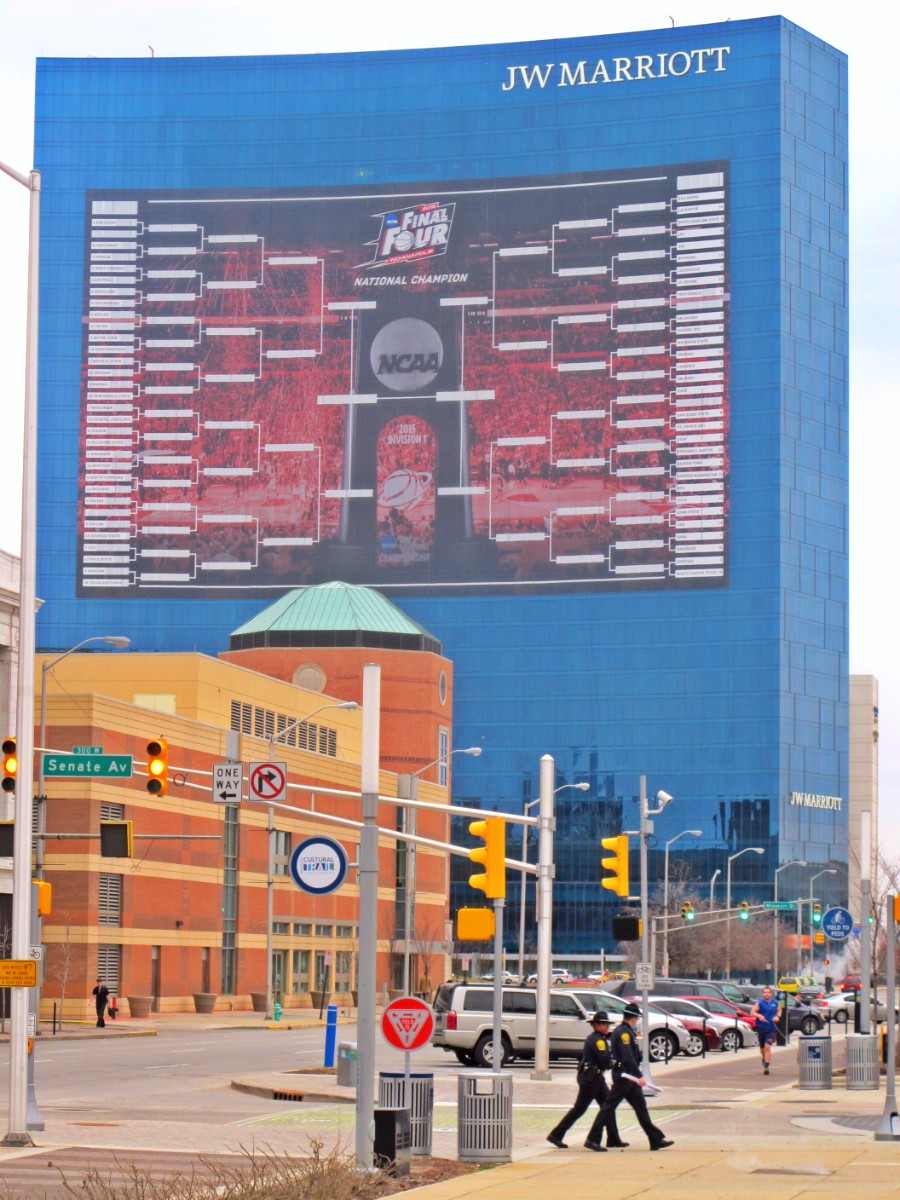
The 2015 bracket displayed on the JW Marriott Indianapolis

Out of 333 eligible Division I teams, 68 participated in the tournament. Eighteen Division I teams were ineligible due to failing to meet APR requirements, self-imposed postseason bans, or reclassification from a lower division. (Note: The 18 teams that are ineligible, and the reasons for ineligibility, are: APR: Alabama State, Appalachian State, Central Arkansas, Florida A&M, Houston Baptist, Lamar, Milwaukee, San Jose State, Southern; Other NCAA infractions: Arkansas–Pine Bluff; Self-imposed bans: Southern Miss, Syracuse; Reclassification: Abilene Christian, Grand Canyon, Incarnate Word, Northern Kentucky, Omaha, UMass Lowell)

Of the 32 automatic bids, 31 were given to programs that won their conference tournaments. The Ivy League did not hold a tournament, but held a one-game playoff to break a tie in the regular season conference standings, with the winner receiving the automatic bid. The remaining 36 bids were granted on an "at-large" basis, which were extended by the NCAA Selection Committee to the teams it deemed to be the best 36 teams that did not receive automatic bids.

Eight teams—the four lowest-seeded automatic qualifiers and the four lowest-seeded at-large teams—played in the First Four (the successor to what had been popularly known as "play-in games" through the 2010 tournament). The winners of these games advanced to the main tournament bracket.

The Selection Committee will also seed the entire field from 1 to 68.

=== Automatic qualifiers ===
The following teams are automatic qualifiers for the 2015 NCAA field by virtue of winning their conference's automatic bid.

| Conference | Team | Appearance | Last bid |
|---|---|---|---|
| ACC | Notre Dame | 34th | 2013 |
| America East | Albany | 5th | 2014 |
| A–10 | VCU | 14th | 2014 |
| American | SMU | 11th | 1993 |
| Atlantic Sun | North Florida | 1st | Never |
| Big 12 | Iowa State | 17th | 2014 |
| Big East | Villanova | 34th | 2014 |
| Big Sky | Eastern Washington | 2nd | 2004 |
| Big South | Coastal Carolina | 4th | 2014 |
| Big Ten | Wisconsin | 21st | 2014 |
| Big West | UC Irvine | 1st | Never |
| Colonial | Northeastern | 8th | 1991 |
| C-USA | UAB | 15th | 2011 |
| Horizon | Valparaiso | 9th | 2013 |
| Ivy League | Harvard | 5th | 2014 |
| MAAC | Manhattan | 8th | 2014 |
| MAC | Buffalo | 1st | Never |
| MEAC | Hampton | 5th | 2011 |
| Missouri Valley | Northern Iowa | 7th | 2010 |
| Mountain West | Wyoming | 15th | 2002 |
| Northeast | Robert Morris | 8th | 2010 |
| Ohio Valley | Belmont | 7th | 2013 |
| Pac-12 | Arizona | 30th | 2014 |
| Patriot | Lafayette | 4th | 2000 |
| SEC | Kentucky | 55th | 2014 |
| Southern | Wofford | 4th | 2014 |
| Southland | Stephen F. Austin | 3rd | 2014 |
| SWAC | Texas Southern | 6th | 2014 |
| Summit | North Dakota State | 3rd | 2014 |
| Sun Belt | Georgia State | 3rd | 2001 |
| West Coast | Gonzaga | 18th | 2014 |
| WAC | New Mexico State | 22nd | 2014 |

=== Tournament seeds ===
Midwest Region – Quicken Loans Arena, Cleveland, Ohio
| Seed | School | Conference | Record | Overall Seed | Berth type | Last bid |
|---|---|---|---|---|---|---|
| 1 | Kentucky | SEC | 34–0 | 1 | Auto | 2014 |
| 2 | Kansas | Big 12 | 26–8 | 8 | At-large | 2014 |
| 3 | Notre Dame | ACC | 29–5 | 12 | Auto | 2013 |
| 4 | Maryland | Big Ten | 27–6 | 14 | At-large | 2010 |
| 5 | West Virginia | Big 12 | 23–9 | 19 | At-large | 2012 |
| 6 | Butler | Big East | 22–10 | 23 | At-large | 2013 |
| 7 | Wichita State | Missouri Valley | 28–4 | 26 | At-large | 2014 |
| 8 | Cincinnati | American | 22–10 | 29 | At-large | 2014 |
| 9 | Purdue | Big Ten | 21–12 | 36 | At-large | 2012 |
| 10 | Indiana | Big Ten | 20–13 | 37 | At-large | 2013 |
| 11 | Texas | Big 12 | 20–13 | 41 | At-large | 2014 |
| 12 | Buffalo | Mid-American | 23–9 | 48 | Auto | Never |
| 13 | Valparaiso | Horizon | 28–5 | 51 | Auto | 2013 |
| 14 | Northeastern | Colonial | 23–11 | 56 | Auto | 1991 |
| 15 | New Mexico State | WAC | 23–10 | 59 | Auto | 2014 |
| 16* | Manhattan | MAAC | 19–13 | 67 | Auto | 2014 |
| 16* | Hampton | MEAC | 16–17 | 68 | Auto | 2011 |

East Region – Carrier Dome, Syracuse, New York
| Seed | School | Conference | Record | Overall Seed | Berth type | Last bid |
|---|---|---|---|---|---|---|
| 1 | Villanova | Big East | 32–2 | 2 | Auto | 2014 |
| 2 | Virginia | ACC | 29–3 | 5 | At-large | 2014 |
| 3 | Oklahoma | Big 12 | 22–10 | 11 | At-large | 2014 |
| 4 | Louisville | ACC | 24–8 | 15 | At-large | 2014 |
| 5 | Northern Iowa | Missouri Valley | 30–3 | 20 | Auto | 2010 |
| 6 | Providence | Big East | 22–11 | 22 | At-large | 2014 |
| 7 | Michigan State | Big Ten | 23–11 | 25 | At-large | 2014 |
| 8 | NC State | ACC | 20–13 | 31 | At-large | 2014 |
| 9 | LSU | SEC | 22–10 | 35 | At-large | 2009 |
| 10 | Georgia | SEC | 21–11 | 40 | At-large | 2011 |
| 11* | Boise State | Mountain West | 25–8 | 45 | At-large | 2013 |
| 11* | Dayton | Atlantic 10 | 25–8 | 46 | At-large | 2014 |
| 12 | Wyoming | Mountain West | 25–9 | 47 | Auto | 2002 |
| 13 | UC Irvine | Big West | 21–12 | 54 | Auto | Never |
| 14 | Albany | America East | 24–8 | 58 | Auto | 2014 |
| 15 | Belmont | Ohio Valley | 22–10 | 60 | Auto | 2013 |
| 16 | Lafayette | Patriot | 20–12 | 63 | Auto | 2000 |

West Region – Staples Center, Los Angeles, California
| Seed | School | Conference | Record | Overall Seed | Berth type | Last bid |
|---|---|---|---|---|---|---|
| 1 | Wisconsin | Big Ten | 31–3 | 4 | Auto | 2014 |
| 2 | Arizona | Pac-12 | 31–3 | 6 | Auto | 2014 |
| 3 | Baylor | Big 12 | 24–9 | 10 | At-large | 2014 |
| 4 | North Carolina | ACC | 24–11 | 13 | At-large | 2014 |
| 5 | Arkansas | SEC | 26–8 | 18 | At-large | 2008 |
| 6 | Xavier | Big East | 21–13 | 24 | At-large | 2014 |
| 7 | VCU | Atlantic 10 | 26–9 | 28 | Auto | 2014 |
| 8 | Oregon | Pac-12 | 25–9 | 30 | At-large | 2014 |
| 9 | Oklahoma State | Big 12 | 18–13 | 34 | At-large | 2014 |
| 10 | Ohio State | Big Ten | 23–10 | 39 | At-large | 2014 |
| 11* | Ole Miss | SEC | 20–12 | 43 | At-large | 2013 |
| 11* | BYU | West Coast | 25–9 | 44 | At-large | 2014 |
| 12 | Wofford | Southern | 28–6 | 49 | Auto | 2014 |
| 13 | Harvard | Ivy | 22–7 | 52 | Auto | 2014 |
| 14 | Georgia State | Sun Belt | 24–9 | 55 | Auto | 2001 |
| 15 | Texas Southern | SWAC | 22–12 | 61 | Auto | 2014 |
| 16 | Coastal Carolina | Big South | 24–9 | 64 | Auto | 2014 |

South Region – NRG Stadium, Houston, Texas
| Seed | School | Conference | Record | Overall Seed | Berth type | Last bid |
|---|---|---|---|---|---|---|
| 1 | Duke | ACC | 29–4 | 3 | At-large | 2014 |
| 2 | Gonzaga | West Coast | 32–2 | 7 | Auto | 2014 |
| 3 | Iowa State | Big 12 | 25–8 | 9 | Auto | 2014 |
| 4 | Georgetown | Big East | 21–10 | 16 | At-large | 2013 |
| 5 | Utah | Pac-12 | 24–8 | 17 | At-large | 2009 |
| 6 | SMU | American | 27–6 | 21 | Auto | 1993 |
| 7 | Iowa | Big Ten | 21–11 | 27 | At-large | 2014 |
| 8 | San Diego State | Mountain West | 26–8 | 32 | At-large | 2014 |
| 9 | St. John's | Big East | 21–11 | 33 | At-large | 2011 |
| 10 | Davidson | Atlantic 10 | 24–7 | 38 | At-large | 2013 |
| 11 | UCLA | Pac-12 | 20–13 | 42 | At-large | 2014 |
| 12 | Stephen F. Austin | Southland | 29–4 | 50 | Auto | 2014 |
| 13 | Eastern Washington | Big Sky | 26–8 | 53 | Auto | 2004 |
| 14 | UAB | C-USA | 19–15 | 57 | Auto | 2011 |
| 15 | North Dakota State | Summit | 23–9 | 62 | Auto | 2014 |
| 16* | North Florida | Atlantic Sun | 23–11 | 65 | Auto | Never |
| 16* | Robert Morris | Northeast | 19–14 | 66 | Auto | 2010 |

*See First Four

Since the 2004 NCAA Division I men's basketball tournament, the four 1 seeds have been seeded overall. This was the third time Kentucky was the overall top seed. The previous time was in the 2012 tournament. Duke was the overall 3 seed for the fourth time, previously advancing to the Final Four in two of those years: 2004 and 2010. Villanova was a 1 seed for the second time in school history; 2006 was the other time. This was the first 1 seed for Wisconsin.

== Bracket ==
=== First Four – Dayton, Ohio ===
The First Four games involved eight teams: the four overall lowest-ranked teams, and the four lowest-ranked at-large teams.

| March 17 – West Region |
| 11 | BYU | 90 |
| 11 | Ole Miss | 94 |

| March 17 – Midwest Region |
| 16 | Hampton | 74 |
| 16 | Manhattan | 64 |

| March 18 – East Region |
| 11 | Boise State | 55 |
| 11 | Dayton | 56 |

| March 18 – South Region |
| 16 | North Florida | 77 |
| 16 | Robert Morris | 81 |

=== Midwest Regional – Cleveland, Ohio ===
First Round; Round of 64; March 19–20
1 | Kentucky | 79
16 | Hampton | 56
Louisville – Thu/Sat
8 | Cincinnati | 66^{OT}
9 | Purdue | 65
5 | West Virginia | 68
12 | Buffalo | 62
Columbus – Fri/Sun
4 | Maryland | 65
13 | Valparaiso | 62
6 | Butler | 56
11 | Texas | 48
Pittsburgh – Thu/Sat
3 | Notre Dame | 69
14 | Northeastern | 65
7 | Wichita State | 81
10 | Indiana | 76
Omaha – Fri/Sun
2 | Kansas | 75
15 | New Mexico State | 56

Second round Round of 32; March 21–22
1 | Kentucky | 64
8 | Cincinnati | 51
5 | West Virginia | 69
4 | Maryland | 59
6 | Butler | 64
3 | Notre Dame | 67^{OT}
7 | Wichita State | 78
2 | Kansas | 65

Regional semifinals Sweet 16; March 26
1 | Kentucky | 78
5 | West Virginia | 39
3 | Notre Dame | 81
7 | Wichita State | 70

Regional Final; Elite 8 March 28
1 | Kentucky | 68
3 | Notre Dame | 66

==== Regional Final summary ====
TBS

Saturday, March 28
8:49 pm EDT

Box Score

#3 Notre Dame Fighting Irish 66, #1 Kentucky Wildcats 68
Scoring by half: 31–31, 35–37
| Pts: Zach Auguste – 20; Rebs: Zach Auguste, Pat Connaughton – 9 Asts: Jerian Grant – 6 | Pts: Karl-Anthony Towns – 25; Rebs: Karl-Anthony Towns, Trey Lyles – 5 Asts: Towns – 4 |

Quicken Loans Arena, Cleveland, Ohio
Attendance: 19,464
Referees: Chris Rastatter, Joe DeRosa, David Hall

==== Midwest Regional all-tournament team ====
Regional all-tournament team: Pat Connaughton, Notre Dame; Zach Auguste, Notre Dame; Willie Cauley-Stein, Kentucky; Andrew Harrison, Kentucky

Regional most outstanding player: Karl-Anthony Towns, Kentucky

=== West Regional – Los Angeles, California ===
First Round; Round of 64; March 19–20
1 | Wisconsin | 86
16 | Coastal Carolina | 72
Omaha – Fri/Sun
8 | Oregon | 79
9 | Oklahoma State | 73
5 | Arkansas | 56
12 | Wofford | 53
Jacksonville – Thu/Sat
4 | North Carolina | 67
13 | Harvard | 65
6 | Xavier | 76
11 | Ole Miss | 57
Jacksonville – Thu/Sat
3 | Baylor | 56
14 | Georgia State | 57
7 | Virginia Commonwealth | 72
10 | Ohio State | 75^{OT}
Portland – Thu/Sat
2 | Arizona | 93
15 | Texas Southern | 72

Second round Round of 32; March 21–22
1 | Wisconsin | 72
8 | Oregon | 65
5 | Arkansas | 78
4 | North Carolina | 87
6 | Xavier | 75
14 | Georgia State | 67
10 | Ohio State | 58
2 | Arizona | 73

Regional semifinals Sweet 16; March 26
1 | Wisconsin | 79
4 | North Carolina | 72
6 | Xavier | 60
2 | Arizona | 68

Regional Final; Elite 8 March 28
1 | Wisconsin | 85
2 | Arizona | 78

==== Regional Final summary ====
TBS

Saturday, March 28
3:09 pm PDT

Box Score

#2 Arizona Wildcats 78, #1 Wisconsin Badgers 85
Scoring by half: 33–30, 45–55
| Pts: Brandon Ashley, R. Hollis-Jefferson – 17; Rebs: R. Hollis-Jefferson – 8 Asts: T. J. McConnell – 5 | Pts: F. Kaminsky III – 29; Rebs: F. Kaminsky III – 6 Asts: Nigel Hayes – 4 |

Staples Center, Los Angeles, California
Attendance: 19,125
Referees: Pat Adams, Michael Stephens, Mike Eades

==== West Regional all-tournament team ====
Regional all-tournament team: Frank Kaminsky, Wisconsin; Josh Gasser, Wisconsin; T. J. McConnell, Arizona; Rondae Hollis-Jefferson, Arizona

Regional most outstanding player: Sam Dekker, Wisconsin

=== East Regional – Syracuse, New York ===
First Round; Round of 64; March 19–20
1 | Villanova | 93
16 | Lafayette | 52
Pittsburgh – Thu/Sat
8 | NC State | 66
9 | LSU | 65
5 | Northern Iowa | 71
12 | Wyoming | 54
Seattle – Fri/Sun
4 | ~~Louisville~~ | 57
13 | California-Irvine | 55
6 | Providence | 53
11 | Dayton | 66
Columbus – Fri/Sun
3 | Oklahoma | 69
14 | Albany | 60
7 | Michigan State | 70
10 | Georgia | 63
Charlotte – Fri/Sun
2 | Virginia | 79
15 | Belmont | 67

Second round Round of 32; March 21–22
1 | Villanova | 68
8 | NC State | 71
5 | Northern Iowa | 53
4 | ~~Louisville~~ | 66
11 | Dayton | 66
3 | Oklahoma | 72
7 | Michigan State | 60
2 | Virginia | 54

Regional semifinals Sweet 16; March 27
8 | NC State | 65
4 | ~~Louisville~~ | 75
3 | Oklahoma | 58
7 | Michigan State | 62

Regional Final; Elite 8 March 29
4 | ~~Louisville~~ | 70
7 | Michigan State | 76^{OT}

On February 20, 2018, the NCAA announced that the wins and records for Louisville's 2011–12, 2012–13, 2013–14, and 2014–15 seasons were vacated due to the sex scandal at Louisville. Unlike forfeiture, a vacated game does not result in the other school being credited with a win, only with Louisville removing the wins from its own record.

==== Regional Final summary ====
CBS

Sunday, March 29
2:20 pm EDT

Box Score

#7 Michigan State Spartans 76, #4 Louisville Cardinals 70 (OT)
Scoring by half: 32–40, 33–25 Overtime: 11–5
| Pts: Travis Trice – 17; Rebs: Branden Dawson – 11; Asts: Denzel Valentine – 6 | Pts: Wayne Blackshear – 28; Rebs: Montrezl Harrell – 9 Asts: Montrezl Harrell – 4 |

Carrier Dome, Syracuse, New York
Attendance: 24,404
Referees: Pat Driscoll, Doug Shows, Verne Harris

==== East Regional all-tournament team ====
Regional all-tournament team: Denzel Valentine, Michigan State; Terry Rozier, Louisville; Montrezl Harrell, Louisville; Wayne Blackshear, Louisville

Regional most outstanding player: Travis Trice, Michigan State.

=== South Regional – Houston, Texas ===
First Round; Round of 64; March 19–20
1 | Duke | 85
16 | Robert Morris | 56
Charlotte – Fri/Sun
8 | San Diego State | 76
9 | St. John's | 64
5 | Utah | 57
12 | Stephen F. Austin | 50
Portland – Thu/Sat
4 | Georgetown | 84
13 | Eastern Washington | 74
6 | SMU | 59
11 | UCLA | 60
Louisville – Thu/Sat
3 | Iowa State | 59
14 | UAB | 60
7 | Iowa | 83
10 | Davidson | 52
Seattle – Fri/Sun
2 | Gonzaga | 86
15 | North Dakota State | 76

Second round Round of 32; March 21–22
1 | Duke | 68
8 | San Diego State | 49
5 | Utah | 75
4 | Georgetown | 64
11 | UCLA | 92
14 | UAB | 75
7 | Iowa | 68
2 | Gonzaga | 87

Regional semifinals Sweet 16; March 27
1 | Duke | 63
5 | Utah | 57
11 | UCLA | 62
2 | Gonzaga | 74

Regional Final; Elite 8 March 29
1 | Duke | 66
2 | Gonzaga | 52

==== Regional Final summary ====
CBS

Sunday, March 29
4:05 pm CDT

Box Score

#2 Gonzaga Bulldogs 52, #1 Duke Blue Devils 66
Scoring by half: 26–31, 26–35
| Pts: Kyle Wiltjer – 16; Rebs: Kyle Wiltjer, Przemek Karnowski, Byron Wesley – 5 Asts: Przemek Karnowski, Byron Wesley, Gary Bell – 2 | Pts: Matt Jones, Justise Winslow – 16; Rebs: Jahlil Okafor – 8 Asts: Tyus Jones – 6 |

NRG Stadium, Houston, Texas
Attendance: 20,744
Referees: Mike Stuart, Doug Sirmons, Jeffrey Anderson

==== South Regional all-tournament team ====
Regional all-tournament team: Matt Jones, Duke; Justise Winslow, Duke; Kyle Wiltjer, Gonzaga; Domantas Sabonis, Gonzaga

Regional most outstanding player: Tyus Jones, Duke

== Final Four ==
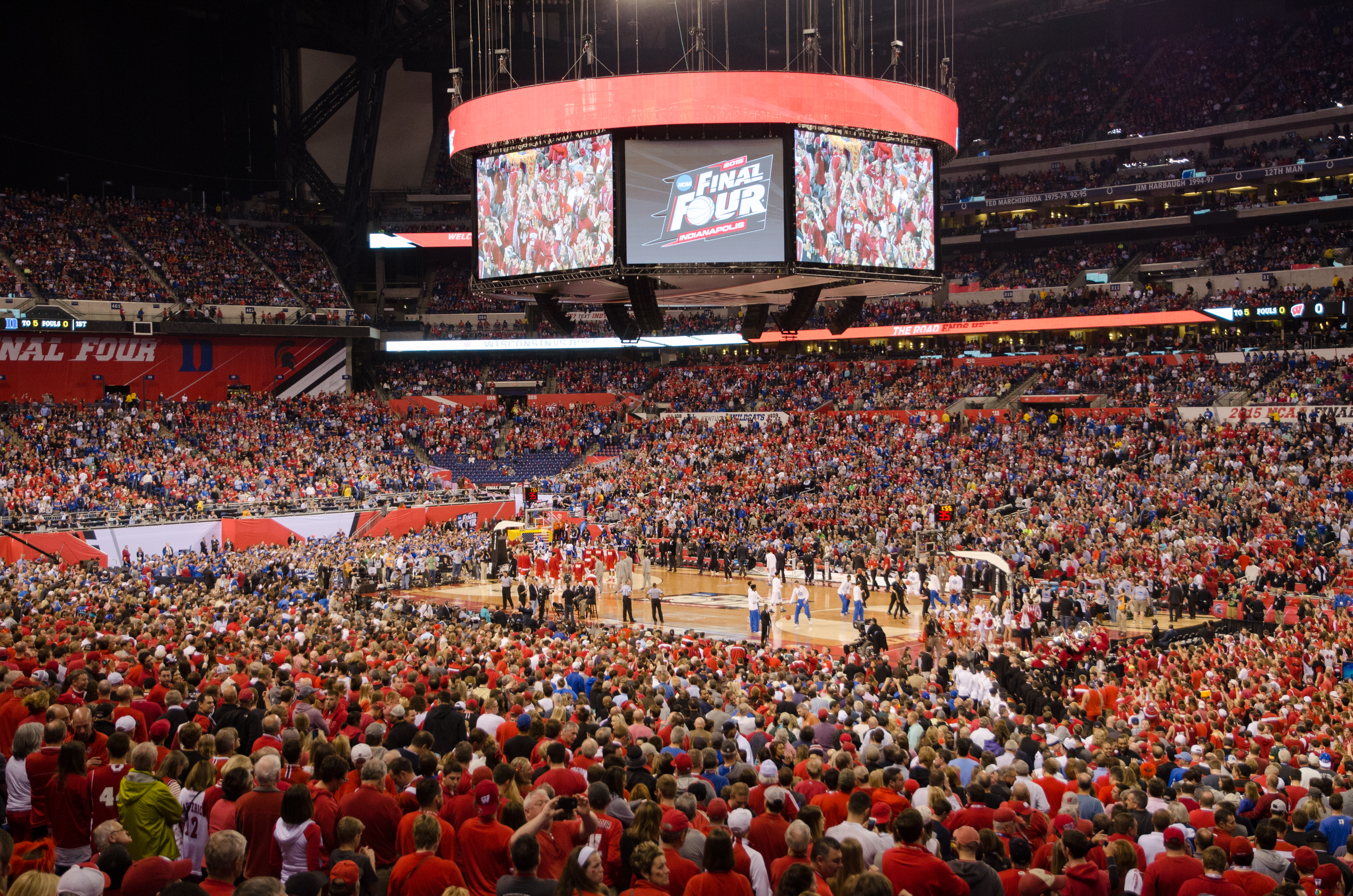
Lucas Oil Stadium before the national championship game between Duke and Wisconsin

During the Final Four round, regardless of the seeds of the participating teams, the champion of the top overall top seed's region plays (Kentucky's Midwest Region) against the champion of the fourth-ranked top seed's region (Wisconsin's West Region), and the champion of the second overall top seed's region plays (Michigan State's East Region) against the champion of the third-ranked top seed's region (Duke's South Region).

=== Final Four - Indianapolis, IN ===
National Semifinals; Final Four; Saturday, April 4
MW1 | Kentucky | 64
W1 | Wisconsin | 71
E7 | Michigan State | 61
S1 | Duke | 81

National Championship Game; Monday, April 6
W1 | Wisconsin | 63
S1 | Duke | 68

=== Game summaries ===
==== Final Four ====
TBS

Saturday, April 4
6:09 p.m. EDT

Box Score

#E7 Michigan State Spartans 61, #S1 Duke Blue Devils 81
Scoring by half: 25–36, 36–45
| Pts: Denzel Valentine – 22; Rebs: Denzel Valentine – 11; Asts: Travis Trice, Lourawls Nairn Jr. – 5 | Pts: Justise Winslow – 19; Rebs: Justise Winslow – 9 Asts: Tyus Jones – 4 |

Lucas Oil Stadium, Indianapolis, Indiana
Attendance: 72,238
Referees: Bryan Kersey, Pat Adams, Mike Eades

TBS

Saturday, April 4
9:06 p.m. EDT

Box Score

#W1 Wisconsin Badgers 71, #MW1 Kentucky Wildcats 64
Scoring by half: 36–36, 35–28
| Pts: F. Kaminsky III – 20; Rebs: F. Kaminsky III – 11; Asts: F. Kaminsky III, Traevon Jackson, Bronson Koenig – 2 | Pts: Karl-Anthony Towns – 16; Rebs: Karl-Anthony Towns – 9 Asts: Andrew Harrison – 4 |

Lucas Oil Stadium, Indianapolis, Indiana
Attendance: 72,238
Referees: Verne Harris, John Higgins, Doug Sirmons

==== National Championship ====
CBS

Monday, April 6
9:18 p.m. EDT

Box Score

#W1 Wisconsin Badgers 63, #S1 Duke Blue Devils 68
Scoring by half: 31–31, 32–37
| Pts: F. Kaminsky III - 21; Rebs: F. Kaminsky III - 12; Asts: Bronson Koenig - 4 | Pts: Tyus Jones - 23; Rebs: Justise Winslow - 9 Asts: Quinn Cook, Amile Jefferson - 2 |

Lucas Oil Stadium, Indianapolis, Indiana
Attendance: 71,149
Referees: Joe DeRosa, Michael Stephens, Pat Driscoll

==== Final Four all-tournament team ====
- Sam Dekker, Wisconsin
- Frank Kaminsky, Wisconsin
- Grayson Allen, Duke
- Justise Winslow, Duke
- Tyus Jones, Duke, Most Outstanding Player

== Tournament notes ==
Kentucky entered the tournament unbeaten. After 22 years without an unbeaten team in the tournament, following UNLV in 1991, this is the second consecutive tournament with an unbeaten team (after Wichita State in the previous). The Wildcats, by beating Cincinnati in the third round, set an NCAA men's record with 36 straight wins to start a season. They would win two more before Wisconsin upset them in the Final Four.

Defending national champion UConn did not qualify.

Kansas extended its streak of consecutive tournament appearances to 26 in a row. They have made each NCAA Tournament dating back to 1990. Kansas would qualify again the next two seasons to set the record for consecutive NCAA Tournament appearances formerly held by North Carolina (1975–2001).

With both Buffalo and Albany winning their respective conferences and reaching the tournament, this is the first time two schools in the State University of New York system have reached the Division I tournament in the same year.

Two teams broke appearance droughts of over 20 years with their bids: Colonial Athletic Association champion Northeastern made its first NCAA appearance since 1991, and American champion Southern Methodist made its first NCAA appearance since 1993.

Harvard and Yale played a one-game playoff at the Palestra. Harvard won in dramatic fashion.

Dayton played a First Four game at their home arena, which is usually not allowed during the men's tournament. The NCAA selection committee indicated that putting Dayton in its home arena "falls within the context" of the committee's procedures.

Of the sixteen games played on March 19, five were decided by one point, a single-day record.

For the first time since 2007 and the fourth time since the field expanded to 64 teams in 1985, all four 5 seeds won their Second Round games. This was also the first time since 2007 that there were four 4 vs. 5 matchups in the third round.

On March 20, all but one "chalk" team won their game (there was only one upset), compared to the four upsets the previous day.

Michigan State reached its seventh Final Four in the last 18 seasons—the best mark in the nation during that time span.

For the first time since 2009, multiple 1 seeded teams reached the Final Four.

For the first time since 2008, two 1 seeded teams reached the Championship, between Kansas and Memphis (later vacated by Memphis).

Wisconsin was in its first final since 1941, and lost; and Duke in its first final since 2010, and won.

The Wisconsin loss extended the Big Ten Conference's losing streak in national championship games to six. As of 2026, Michigan is the last Big Ten team to win a National Championship—having done so in 2026—breaking the streak.

=== Upsets ===
Per the NCAA, "Upsets are defined as when the winner of the game was seeded five or more places lower than the team it defeated."

The 2015 tournament saw a total of 7 upsets, with four in the first round and three in the second round.

Upsets in the 2015 NCAA Division I men's basketball tournament
| Round | Midwest | West | East | South |
|---|---|---|---|---|
| Round of 64 | None | No. 14 Georgia State defeated No. 3 Baylor, 57–56 | No. 11 Dayton defeated No. 6 Providence, 66–53 | No. 14 UAB defeated No. 3 Iowa State, 60–59; No. 11 UCLA defeated No. 6 SMU, 60–59 |
| Round of 32 | No. 7 Wichita State defeated No. 2 Kansas, 78–65 | None | No. 8 NC State defeated No. 1 Villanova, 71–68; No. 7 Michigan State defeated No. 2 Virginia, 60–54 | None |
| Sweet 16 | None | | | |
| Elite 8 | None | | | |
| Final 4 | None | | | |
| National Championship | None | | | |

== Record by conference ==
| Conference | Bids | Record | Win % | R64 | R32 | S16 | E8 | F4 | CG | NC |
|---|---|---|---|---|---|---|---|---|---|---|
| ACC | 6 | 17–5 | .773 | 6 | 6 | 5 | 3 | 1 | 1 | 1 |
| Big Ten | 7 | 12–7 | .632 | 7 | 5 | 2 | 2 | 2 | 1 | – |
| SEC | 5 | 6–5 | .545 | 5 | 2 | 1 | 1 | 1 | – | – |
| Pac-12 | 4 | 8–4 | .667 | 4 | 4 | 3 | 1 | – | – | – |
| West Coast | 2 | 3–2 | .600 | 1 | 1 | 1 | 1 | – | – | – |
| Big 12 | 7 | 5–7 | .417 | 7 | 3 | 2 | – | – | – | – |
| Big East | 6 | 5–6 | .455 | 6 | 4 | 1 | – | – | – | – |
| Missouri Valley | 2 | 3–2 | .600 | 2 | 2 | 1 | – | – | – | – |
| Atlantic 10 | 3 | 2–3 | .400 | 3 | 1 | – | – | – | – | – |
| Mountain West | 3 | 1–3 | .250 | 2 | 1 | – | – | – | – | – |
| American | 2 | 1–2 | .333 | 2 | 1 | – | – | – | – | – |
| Conference USA | 1 | 1–1 | .500 | 1 | 1 | – | – | – | – | – |
| Sun Belt | 1 | 1–1 | .500 | 1 | 1 | – | – | – | – | – |
| MEAC | 1 | 1–1 | .500 | 1 | – | – | – | – | – | – |
| Northeast | 1 | 1–1 | .500 | 1 | – | – | – | – | – | – |

- The R64, R32, S16, E8, F4, CG, and NC columns indicate how many teams from each conference were in the round of 64 (second round), round of 32 (third round), Sweet 16, Elite Eight, Final Four, championship game, and national champion, respectively.
- The "Record" column includes wins in the First Four for Atlantic 10, MEAC, NEC, and SEC.
- The Atlantic Sun and MAAC each had one representative, eliminated in the First Four with a record of 0–1.
- The America East, Big Sky, Big South, Big West, Colonial, Horizon League, Ivy, MAC, OVC, Patriot League, Southern, Southland, SWAC, Summit, and WAC each had one representative, eliminated in the second round with a record of 0–1.

== Media coverage ==
=== Story headlines ===
The round of 64 started off with multiple upsets with majority of the upsets coming out of the Big 12 conference. The television coverages of CBS and Turner had one of the best overall ratings on March 20, 2015. According to Nielsen estimates, exclusive coverage of the opening full round of the NCAA Division I Men's Basketball Championship across TBS, CBS, TNT and truTV averaged a 6.6 overnight household rating/14 share — up 10% from last year and the highest since the tournament expanded to four telecast windows for the entire day.

One of the upsets that happened was UAB upsetting No. 3 seed Iowa State 60–59. The 19-15 UAB Blazers qualified for the NCAA tournament for the first time since 2011 by winning three-straight to earn the Conference USA tournament title and an automatic bid.

Baylor, a No. 3 seed, took on No. 14 seed Georgia State and with less than three minutes to go, Georgia State staged a 13–0 run to beat Baylor. "The comeback was punctuated with a three by R. J. Hunter, son of stool-bound coach Ron Hunter, that has already produced a moment sure to go down in history – the elder Hunter, who already tore his Achilles celebrating the team's Sun Belt conference tourney victory, fell off that stool in ecstasy after his son's three dropped to give the Panthers the 57-56 lead that would be the final margin," according to Andy Hutchins.

However, the most talked about headline was UCLA not only making the tournament despite a poor performance in the Pac-12, but also with a call with 13 seconds left when UCLA took on SMU and coach Larry Brown. A late second goaltending that cost SMU the game sparked a lot of attention in sports media and social media. The Bruins moved on to play UAB in the round of 32. Both teams played each other earlier in the season, when UCLA beat the Blazers 88–76 in the Bahamas back in November. Sam Vecenie a CBS writer, was quoted saying, "Funny part of that story? It was the last-place game of the Battle 4 Atlantis tournament. Cool to see how these two teams have turned around their season."

=== Television ===
The year 2015 marked the fifth year of a 14-year partnership between CBS and Turner cable networks TBS, TNT, and truTV to cover the entire tournament under the NCAA March Madness banner. TBS aired the Final Four for the second consecutive year.

- First Four – truTV
- Second and third rounds – CBS, TBS, TNT, and truTV
- Regional semifinals and Finals (Sweet Sixteen and Elite Eight) – CBS and TBS/2015 NCAA Division II men's basketball tournament National Championship – CBS
- National semifinals (Final Four) – TBS, TNT, truTV
  - TBS provided traditional coverage; TNT and truTV each gave team-specific broadcasts.
- National Championship – CBS
- Reese's College Basketball All Star Game– CBS

==== Studio hosts ====
- Greg Gumbel (New York City and Indianapolis) – second round, third round, regionals, Final Four and national championship game
- Ernie Johnson Jr. (New York City, Atlanta and Indianapolis) – second round, third round, regional semi-finals, Final Four and national championship game
- Matt Winer (Atlanta) – First Four, second round and third round

==== Studio analysts ====
- Charles Barkley (New York City and Indianapolis) – second round, third round, regionals, Final Four and national championship game
- Mateen Cleaves (Atlanta) – First Four, second round and third round
- Seth Davis (Atlanta and Indianapolis) – First Four, second round, third round, regional semi-finals, Final Four and national championship game
- Jamie Dixon (Atlanta) – second round
- Doug Gottlieb (New York City) – Regionals
- Anthony Grant (Atlanta) – second round
- Ron Hunter (Atlanta) – regional semi-finals
- Clark Kellogg (New York City and Indianapolis) – second round, third round, regionals, Final Four and national championship game
- Reggie Miller (Indianapolis) – Final Four and national championship game
- Wally Szczerbiak (Atlanta and New York City) – First Four and Second Round
- Kenny Smith (New York City and Indianapolis) – second round, third round, regionals, Final Four and national championship game
- Steve Smith (Atlanta and Indianapolis) – regional semi-finals, Final Four and national championship game
- Buzz Williams (Atlanta) – second round

==== Commentary teams ====
- Jim Nantz/Bill Raftery/Grant Hill/Tracy Wolfson – First and Second Rounds at Charlotte, North Carolina; South Regional at Houston, Texas; Final Four and National Championship at Indianapolis, Indiana
- Marv Albert or Brian Anderson/Chris Webber/Len Elmore/Lewis Johnson – First and Second Rounds at Omaha, Nebraska; Midwest Regional at Cleveland, Ohio
  - Anderson called the Midwest Regional final after Albert withdrew from the game due to illness.
- Verne Lundquist/Jim Spanarkel/Allie LaForce – First and Second Rounds at Louisville, Kentucky; East Regional at Syracuse, New York
- Kevin Harlan/Reggie Miller/Dan Bonner/Rachel Nichols – First and Second Rounds at Portland, Oregon; West Regional at Los Angeles, California
- Ian Eagle/Doug Gottlieb/Evan Washburn – First Four at Dayton, Ohio; First and Second Rounds at Columbus, Ohio
- Brian Anderson/Steve Smith/Lewis Johnson (First Four) or Dana Jacobson (Pittsburgh) – First Four at Dayton, Ohio; First and Second Rounds at Pittsburgh, Pennsylvania
- Spero Dedes/Mike Gminski/Jaime Maggio – First and Second Rounds at Seattle, Washington
- Andrew Catalon/Steve Lappas/Jamie Erdahl – First and Second Rounds at Jacksonville, Florida

===== Team Stream broadcasts =====
For the second consecutive year, the semifinals were exclusive to cable, with TBS airing the standard broadcast with Nantz, Raftery, Hill, and Wolfson. TNT and TruTV aired Team Stream by Bleacher Report broadcasts (known as Teamcasts during the 2014 tournament), which featured localized commentary and features with specific focuses on each participating team.

- Tom Werme/Alaa Abdelnaby/[[Chris Spatola]] – Duke Team Stream on TNT
- Brian Anderson/Mateen Cleaves/Shireen Saski – Michigan State Team Stream on truTV
- Dave Baker/Rex Chapman/Michael Eaves – Kentucky Team Stream on TNT
- Wayne Larrivee/Mike Kelley/Phil Dawson – Wisconsin Team Stream on truTV

=== Radio ===
Westwood One had exclusive radio rights to the entire tournament.

==== First Four ====
- Brandon Gaudin and Alaa Abdelnaby – at Dayton, Ohio

==== Second and Third rounds ====
- Tom McCarthy and Donny Marshall – Jacksonville, Florida
- John Sadak and Bill Frieder – Louisville, Kentucky
- Scott Graham and Kevin Grevey – Pittsburgh, Pennsylvania
- Wayne Larrivee and Mike Montgomery – Portland, Oregon
- Gary Cohen and Kelly Tripucka – Charlotte, North Carolina
- Dave Sims and Jim Jackson – Columbus, Ohio
- Kevin Kugler and Will Perdue – Omaha, Nebraska
- Kevin Calabro and P. J. Carlesimo – Seattle, Washington

==== Regionals ====
- Ian Eagle and P. J. Carlesimo – East Regional at Syracuse, New York
- Gary Cohen and Bill Frieder – Midwest Regional at Cleveland, Ohio
- Kevin Kugler and Will Perdue – South Regional at Houston, Texas
- Wayne Larrivee and Donny Marshall – West Regional at Los Angeles, California

==== Final Four ====
- Kevin Kugler, Clark Kellogg, and Jim Gray – Indianapolis, Indiana

== See also ==
- 2015 NCAA Division II men's basketball tournament
- 2015 NCAA Division III men's basketball tournament
- 2015 NCAA Division I women's basketball tournament
- 2015 NCAA Division II women's basketball tournament
- 2015 NCAA Division III women's basketball tournament
- 2015 National Invitation Tournament
- 2015 Women's National Invitation Tournament
- 2015 NAIA Division I men's basketball tournament
- 2015 NAIA Division II men's basketball tournament
- 2015 NAIA Division I women's basketball tournament
- 2015 NAIA Division II women's basketball tournament
- 2015 College Basketball Invitational
- 2015 CollegeInsider.com Postseason Tournament
