= Carmen Maciariello =

American basketball coach (born 1978)

Biographical details
- Born: May 27, 1978 (age 48); Clifton Park, New York, U.S.

Playing career
- 1996–1999: New Hampshire
- 2000–2001: Siena

Coaching career (HC unless noted)
- 2008–2011: Fairfield (assistant)
- 2011–2014: Boston University (assistant)
- 2014–2018: George Washington (assistant)
- 2018–2019: Siena (assistant)
- 2019–2024: Siena

Administrative career (AD unless noted)
- 2005–2006: Siena (dir. of ops.)
- 2011: Providence (dir. of ops.)

Head coaching record
- Overall: 68–72 (.486)

Accomplishments and honors

Championships
- 2 MAAC regular season (2020, 2021)

Carmen Maciariello Jr. (born May 27, 1978) is an American former college basketball player and most recently served as head coach of the Siena Saints men's basketball team.

== Playing career ==
Maciariello played high school basketball at Shenendehowa High School where he led the school to a Section II Championship, while also being named Albany Times Union Player of the Year. He played his college basketball for three years at New Hampshire where he averaged 8.8 points per game in 77 career games before transferring to Siena for his final season of eligibility.

After graduation, Maciariello obtained Italian citizenship and played professional basketball in Italy for four seasons.

== Coaching career ==
Maciariello's first coaching opportunity came with his alma mater as the director of basketball operations at Siena under Fran McCaffery in his first season at the helm. He then went on to work with the Albany City Rocks AAU program until returning to the college coaching ranks in 2008 at Fairfield under Ed Cooley. He'd follow Cooley briefly to Providence to serve as the director of operations, but would ultimately take an assistant coaching position at Boston University in that same offseason. After two years at BU, Maciariello joined the staff at George Washington, where he was on staff for the Colonials' 2016 NIT Championship.

In 2018, Maciariello returned to his alma mater as an assistant coach under Jamion Christian. He was elevated to head coach on March 25, 2019 after Christian accepted the head coaching position at George Washington, making him the 18th head coach in Siena basketball history.

In his first season, he led the Saints to the #1 seed and a regular season championship for the first time since 2010. The Saints entered the MAAC tournament as heavy favorites to advance to the NCAA tournament, Manhattan coach Steve Masiello, went as far to reference the tournament as "The Siena Invitational". In their first game at the MAAC Tournament, the Saints easily defeated Manhattan 63–49. Shortly before their semifinal, the MAAC was forced to cancel the tournament due to the COVID-19 pandemic. As regular season champions, the MAAC announced Siena would be named Conference Champions and were awarded the conference's automatic bid to the NCAA tournament. It was Siena's first bid since winning three consecutive MAAC tournaments between 2008 and 2010. The tournament was later cancelled along with the remainder of the college basketball season as a result of the outbreak.

Despite the cancellation of the tournament, Maciariello became just the second coach in program history to earn a berth to the NCAA tournament in his first season as head coach, and was the first in program history to win the MAAC regular season title in his first year. He led the Saints to another regular season title the following year.

On March 26, 2021 Siena announced that Maciariello had signed an extension putting him under contract through 2026.

After the only losing season in his head coaching career, Siena fired Maciariello on March 20, 2024.

== Head coaching record ==
Record table
| Season | Team | Overall | Conference | Standing | Postseason |
|---|---|---|---|---|---|
Siena Saints (Metro Atlantic Athletic Conference) (2019–2024)
| 2019–20 | Siena | 20–10 | 15–5 | 1st | No postseason held |
| 2020–21 | Siena | 12–5 | 12–4 | T–1st | |
| 2021–22 | Siena | 15–14 | 12–8 | 3rd | |
| 2022–23 | Siena | 17–15 | 11–9 | T—3rd | |
| 2023–24 | Siena | 4–28 | 3–17 | 11th | |
| Siena: | | 68–72 (.486) | 53–43 (.552) | | |
| Total: | | 68–72 (.486) | | | |
National champion Postseason invitational champion Conference regular season champion Conference regular season and conference tournament champion Division regular season champion Division regular season and conference tournament champion Conference tournament champion
