= 2014–15 NCAA Division I men's basketball season =

Basketball season

- Preseason AP No. 1: Kentucky Wildcats
- Regular season: November 14, 2014 – March 15, 2015
- NCAA Tournament: 2015
- Tournament dates: March 17 – April 6, 2015
- National Championship: Lucas Oil Stadium; Indianapolis, Indiana
- NCAA Champions: Duke Blue Devils
- Other champions: Stanford Cardinal (NIT), Loyola-Chicago Ramblers (CBI), Evansville Purple Aces (CIT)
- Player of the Year (Naismith, Wooden): Frank Kaminsky, Wisconsin Badgers

The 2014–15 NCAA Division I men's basketball season began in November 2014 and ended in Indianapolis, Indiana, with the 2015 NCAA Men's Division I Basketball Tournament Final Four on April 4, 2015, and the national championship game on April 6. Practices officially began on October 3, 2014.

== Season headlines ==
- May 14 – The NCAA announced its Academic Progress Rate (APR) sanctions for the 2014–15 school year. A total of 36 programs in 11 sports were declared ineligible for postseason play due to failure to meet the required APR benchmark, including the following eight Division I men's basketball teams:
  - Alabama State
  - Appalachian State
  - Central Arkansas
  - Florida A&M
  - Houston Baptist
  - Lamar
  - Milwaukee
  - San Jose State
  - In addition to the above teams, the entire athletic program at Southern University, including the men's basketball team, was ineligible for postseason play due to failure to supply usable academic data to the NCAA.
- May 16 – The ACC and the SEC would use a 30-second shot clock during exhibition games on an experimental basis for the upcoming season.
- June 10 – Georgetown and Syracuse announced that their men's basketball rivalry, on hold since 2013 due to the Big East realignment, would resume in 2015–16. The initial contract was to run for four seasons.
- November 3 – The AP preseason All-American team was named. North Carolina junior guard Marcus Paige was the leading vote-getter with 57 of 65 possible votes. Joining him on the team were Louisville junior forward Montrezl Harrell (56 votes), Wisconsin senior center Frank Kaminsky, Wichita State junior guard Fred VanVleet and Duke freshman center Jahlil Okafor. Okafor was also the preseason Player of the Year.
- November 13 – The NCAA announced five future Final Four sites: Glendale, Arizona (2017), San Antonio (2018), Minneapolis (2019), Atlanta (2020), and Indianapolis (2021).
- December 6 – NJIT, the lone Independent in Division 1 basketball, upset 17th-ranked Michigan.
- January 2 – Cincinnati head coach Mick Cronin was placed in an advisory role to the team for the remainder of the season while dealing with arterial dissection, a non-life-threatening vascular condition.
- February 3 – Turner Sports and CBS Sports announced that Bill Raftery and Grant Hill would replace Greg Anthony to call the 2015 NCAA tournament with the team of Jim Nantz and reporter Tracy Wolfson.
- February 4 – Syracuse announced that it had self-imposed a postseason ban in response to an ongoing NCAA investigation into infractions that occurred over much of the early 21st century.
- February 7 – Former North Carolina coach Dean Smith died at his home in Chapel Hill at the age of 83.
- February 11 – Former UNLV coach Jerry Tarkanian died at the age of 84.
- March 6 – The NCAA announced the results of its investigation of the Syracuse men's basketball and football programs, levying the following penalties on the basketball program:
  - A total of 108 wins in the 2004–05, 2005–06, 2006–07, 2010–11, and 2011–12 seasons were ordered vacated. This was the most wins ever taken away from a Division I men's program, and dropped Syracuse head coach Jim Boeheim from second on the all-time Division I wins list to sixth.
  - Boeheim was initially suspended for the first nine games of the 2015–16 ACC season, which was later modified to the first 9 games immediately following the ruling of the NCAA Board of Appeals, beginning with the renewed rivalry game against The Georgetown University Hoyas
  - The program initially lost three scholarships for each of the following four seasons (through 2018–19), later reduced to two per season following an appeal by the university to the NCAA.
  - Recruiting was restricted for two seasons, and the program was placed on probation for five years.
- March 18 – In the wake of the Syracuse sanctions, Boeheim announced that he would retire at the end of the 2017–18 season, with top assistant Mike Hopkins his planned successor. Syracuse athletic director Daryl Gross announced his resignation, effective immediately.

=== Milestones and records ===
- January 25 – Duke coach Mike Krzyzewski became the first Division I men's coach with 1,000 career wins, following the Blue Devils' 77–68 win over St. John's at Madison Square Garden.
- February 7 – Kyle Collinsworth of BYU set a new single-season Division I record for triple-doubles. His 23 points, 12 rebounds, and 10 assists in the Cougars' 87–68 win at Loyola Marymount gave him five triple-doubles for the season, breaking a tie with four other players.
- February 25 – William & Mary guard Marcus Thornton surpassed Chet Giermak's school scoring record of 2,052. The mark had stood since 1950; the 65-year-old record had been the longest-standing school career scoring record in all of NCAA Division I basketball at the time it was broken.
- March 2 – Virginia became the first team not from Tobacco Road to win back-to-back outright Atlantic Coast Conference regular season championships.
- March 5 – Delaware State center Kendall Gray recorded 33 points and 30 rebounds against Coppin State, becoming the first NCAA Division I player to grab 30 rebounds in a game since December 14, 2005, and only the seventh overall in the past 40 seasons.
- March 9 – Collinsworth's 13 points, 14 rebounds, and 11 assists in BYU's 84–70 win over Portland in the West Coast Conference tournament semifinals gave him six triple-doubles for both this season and his career, tying him with Michael Anderson of Drexel and Shaquille O'Neal of LSU for the Division I career record.
- The following players surpassed 2,000 points in their career: BYU guard Tyler Haws, Auburn guard Antoine Mason, Stanford guard Chasson Randle, St. John's guard D'Angelo Harrison, Oregon guard Joe Young, San Diego guard Johnny Dee, William & Mary guard Marcus Thornton, Marist forward Chauvaughn Lewis, Green Bay guard Keifer Sykes, Penn State guard D. J. Newbill and Providence forward LaDontae Henton.

== Conference membership changes ==
The 2014–15 season saw the final wave of membership changes resulting from a major realignment of NCAA Division I conferences. The cycle began in 2010 with the Big Ten and the then-Pac-10 publicly announcing their intentions to expand. The fallout from these conferences' moves later affected a majority of NCAA Division I conferences.

| School | Former conference | New conference |
|---|---|---|
| Appalachian State Mountaineers | Southern Conference | Sun Belt Conference |
| Davidson Wildcats | Southern Conference | Atlantic 10 Conference |
| East Carolina Pirates | Conference USA | American Athletic Conference ("The American") |
| East Tennessee State Buccaneers | Atlantic Sun Conference | Southern Conference |
| Elon Phoenix | Southern Conference | Colonial Athletic Association |
| Georgia Southern Eagles | Southern Conference | Sun Belt Conference |
| Idaho Vandals | Western Athletic Conference | Big Sky Conference |
| Louisville Cardinals | American Athletic Conference ("The American") | Atlantic Coast Conference |
| Maryland Terrapins | Atlantic Coast Conference | Big Ten Conference |
| Mercer Bears | Atlantic Sun Conference | Southern Conference |
| Oral Roberts Golden Eagles | Southland Conference | Summit League |
| Rutgers Scarlet Knights | American Athletic Conference ("The American") | Big Ten Conference |
| Tulane Green Wave | Conference USA | American Athletic Conference ("The American") |
| Tulsa Golden Hurricane | Conference USA | American Athletic Conference ("The American") |
| VMI Keydets | Big South Conference | Southern Conference |
| Western Kentucky Hilltoppers | Sun Belt Conference | Conference USA |

This was also the final season for Texas–Pan American (UTPA) under that name. At the start of the 2015–16 school year, UTPA merged with the University of Texas at Brownsville to form the new University of Texas Rio Grande Valley (UTRGV). UTPA's athletic program and WAC membership were inherited by UTRGV.

It was also the final season for Northern Kentucky in the Atlantic Sun Conference (A-Sun) and the final season for NJIT as an independent. On May 11, 2015, it was announced that Northern Kentucky would join the Horizon League effective July 1. The A-Sun soon filled the place left by Northern Kentucky, announcing on June 12 that NJIT would become a member effective July 1.

== Season outlook ==
=== Pre-season polls ===
The top 25 from the AP Poll and USA Today Coaches Poll.

'Associated Press'
| Ranking | Team |
|---|---|
| 1 | Kentucky (52) |
| 2 | Arizona (5) |
| 3 | Wisconsin (8) |
| 4 | Duke |
| 5 | Kansas |
| 6 | North Carolina |
| 7 | Florida |
| 8 | Louisville |
| 9 | Virginia |
| 10 | Texas |
| 11 | Wichita State |
| 12 | Villanova |
| 13 | Gonzaga |
| 14 | Iowa State |
| 15 | VCU |
| 16 | San Diego State |
| 17 | UConn |
| 18 | Michigan State |
| 19 | Oklahoma |
| 20 | Ohio State |
| 21 | Nebraska |
| 22 | SMU |
| 23 | Syracuse |
| 24 | Michigan |
| 25 | Utahт; Harvardт |

USA Today Coaches
| Ranking | Team |
|---|---|
| 1 | Kentucky (24) |
| 2 | Arizona (3) |
| 3 | Duke (2) |
| 4 | Wisconsin (3) |
| 5 | Kansas |
| 6 | North Carolina |
| 7 | Florida |
| 8 | Virginia |
| 9 | Louisville |
| 10 | Texas |
| 11 | Wichita State |
| 12 | Villanova |
| 13 | Gonzaga |
| 14 | Iowa State |
| 15 | UConn |
| 16 | VCU |
| 17 | San Diego State |
| 18 | Michigan State |
| 19 | Oklahoma |
| 20 | Ohio State |
| 21 | Nebraska |
| 22 | SMU |
| 23 | Michigan |
| 24 | Syracuse |
| 25 | Iowa |

== Regular season ==
=== Early-season tournaments ===
| Name | Dates | Location | No. teams | Champion |
|---|---|---|---|---|
| 2K Sports Classic | November 20–21 | Madison Square Garden (New York City) | 4* | Texas |
| Puerto Rico Tip-Off | November 20–21, 23 | Roberto Clemente Coliseum (San Juan, Puerto Rico) | 8 | West Virginia |
| Charleston Classic | November 20–21, 23 | TD Arena (Charleston, South Carolina) | 8 | Miami (FL) |
| Coaches vs. Cancer Classic | November 21–22 | Barclays Center (Brooklyn, New York) | 4* | Duke |
| Paradise Jam tournament | November 21–24 | Sports and Fitness Center (Saint Thomas, VI) | 8 | Seton Hall |
| Hall of Fame Tip Off | November 22–23 | Mohegan Sun (Uncasville, Connecticut) | 4 | Providence (Naismith) Northeastern (Springfield) |
| MGM Grand Main Event | November 24, 26 | MGM Grand Garden Arena (Las Vegas) | 4* | Oklahoma State |
| Corpus Christi Coastal Classic | November 28–29 | American Bank Center (Corpus Christi, Texas) | 4* | TCU |
| CBE Hall of Fame Classic | November 24–25 | Sprint Center (Kansas City, Missouri) | 4* | Maryland |
| Legends Classic | November 24–25 | Barclays Center (Brooklyn, New York) | 4* | Villanova |
| Gulf Coast Showcase | November 24–26 | Germain Arena (Estero, Florida) | 8 | Green Bay |
| Maui Invitational tournament | November 24–26 | Lahaina Civic Center (Lahaina, HI) | 8* | Arizona |
| Cancún Challenge | November 25–26 | Moon Palace Golf & Spa Resort (Cancún, MX) | 8 | Northern Iowa (Riviera Division); North Florida (Mayan Division) |
| NIT Season Tip-Off | November 26–28 | Madison Square Garden (New York City) | 4 | Gonzaga |
| Battle 4 Atlantis | November 26–28 | Imperial Arena (Nassau, BAH) | 8 | Wisconsin |
| Great Alaska Shootout | November 26–29 | Sullivan Arena (Anchorage, AK) | 8 | Colorado State |
| Old Spice Classic | November 27–28, 30 | HP Field House (Lake Buena Vista, Florida) | 8 | Kansas |
| Wooden Legacy | November 27–28, 30 | Anaheim Convention Center (Anaheim, California) | 8 | Washington |
| Las Vegas Invitational | November 27–28 | Orleans Arena (Las Vegas) | 4* | Illinois |
| Emerald Coast Classic | November 28–29 | Emerald Coast Classic Arena (Niceville, Florida) | 4* | Ole Miss |
| Barclays Center Classic | November 28–29 | Barclays Center (Brooklyn, New York) | 4* | Virginia |
| Las Vegas Classic | December 22–23 | Orleans Arena (Las Vegas) | 4* | Loyola–Chicago |
| Diamond Head Classic | December 22–23, 25 | Stan Sheriff Center (Honolulu, HI) | 8 | George Washington |

*Although these tournaments included more teams, only the number listed played for the championship.

=== Conferences ===
==== Conference winners and tournaments ====
Thirty-one conference seasons concluded with a single-elimination tournament. The teams in each conference that won their regular-season titles were given the number one seed in their respective conference tournaments. Conference tournament winners received an automatic bid to the 2015 NCAA Division I men's basketball tournament. The Ivy League was the only NCAA Division I conference that did not hold a conference tournament, instead sending its regular-season champion to the NCAA tournament.

| Conference | Regular season first place | Conference player of the year | Conference Coach of the Year | Conference tournament | Tournament venue (city) | Tournament winner |
|---|---|---|---|---|---|---|
| America East Conference | Albany | Jameel Warney, Stony Brook | Will Brown, Albany | 2015 America East men's basketball tournament | Campus sites | Albany |
| American Athletic Conference | SMU | Nic Moore, SMU | Fran Dunphy, Temple | 2015 American Athletic Conference men's basketball tournament | XL Center (Hartford, Connecticut) | SMU |
| Atlantic 10 Conference | Davidson | Tyler Kalinoski, Davidson | Bob McKillop, Davidson | 2015 Atlantic 10 men's basketball tournament | Barclays Center (Brooklyn, New York) | VCU |
| Atlantic Coast Conference | Virginia | Jahlil Okafor, Duke | Tony Bennett, Virginia | 2015 ACC men's basketball tournament | Greensboro Coliseum (Greensboro, North Carolina) | Notre Dame |
| Atlantic Sun Conference | North Florida | Ty Greene, USC Upstate | Matthew Driscoll, North Florida | 2015 Atlantic Sun men's basketball tournament | Campus sites | North Florida |
| Big 12 Conference | Kansas | Buddy Hield, Oklahoma | Bob Huggins, West Virginia | 2015 Big 12 men's basketball tournament | Sprint Center (Kansas City, Missouri) | Iowa State |
| Big East Conference | Villanova | Ryan Arcidiacono, Villanova & Kris Dunn, Providence | Jay Wright, Villanova | 2015 Big East men's basketball tournament | Madison Square Garden (New York City) | Villanova |
| Big Sky Conference | Eastern Washington & Montana (Note: Top seed in conference tournament) | Mikh McKinney, Sacramento State | Jim Hayford, Eastern Washington; Brian Katz, Sacramento State | 2015 Big Sky Conference men's basketball tournament | At regular-season champion (Note: Montana won a tiebreaker with Eastern Washington for the top seed in the conference tournament and hosting rights. The tournament was thus held at Dahlberg Arena in Missoula, Montana.) | Eastern Washington |
| Big South Conference | Charleston Southern & High Point | Saah Nimley, Charleston Southern | Barclay Radebaugh, Charleston Southern | 2015 Big South Conference men's basketball tournament | HTC Center (Conway, South Carolina) | Coastal Carolina |
| Big Ten Conference | Wisconsin | Frank Kaminsky, Wisconsin | Bo Ryan, Wisconsin (coaches); Mark Turgeon, Maryland (media) | 2015 Big Ten Conference men's basketball tournament | United Center (Chicago) | Wisconsin |
| Big West Conference | UC Davis | Corey Hawkins, UC Davis | Jim Les, UC Davis | 2015 Big West Conference men's basketball tournament | Honda Center (Anaheim, California) | UC Irvine |
| Colonial Athletic Association | James Madison, Northeastern, UNC Wilmington & William & Mary | Marcus Thornton, William & Mary | Kevin Keatts, UNC Wilmington | 2015 CAA men's basketball tournament | Royal Farms Arena (Baltimore) | Northeastern |
| Conference USA | Louisiana Tech | Speedy Smith, Louisiana Tech | Michael White, Louisiana Tech | 2015 Conference USA men's basketball tournament | Birmingham–Jefferson Convention Complex (Birmingham, Alabama) | UAB |
| Horizon League | Valparaiso | Keifer Sykes, Green Bay | Bryce Drew, Valparaiso | 2015 Horizon League men's basketball tournament | First round at campus sites Quarterfinals and semifinals at top seed (Note: As Valparaiso won the regular-season league title outright, it hosted the semifinals and finals at the Athletics–Recreation Center in Valparaiso, Indiana.); Final at top remaining seed (Note: Since Valparaiso won its conference tournament semifinal, it also hosted the final at the same venue.) | Valparaiso |
| Ivy League | Harvard | Justin Sears, Yale | James Jones, Yale | No tournament | | |
| Metro Atlantic Athletic Conference | Iona | David Laury, Iona | Kevin Baggett, Rider | 2015 MAAC men's basketball tournament | Times Union Center (Albany, New York) | Manhattan |
| Mid-American Conference | Central Michigan (West); Buffalo & Kent State (East) | Justin Moss, Buffalo | Keno Davis, Central Michigan | 2015 Mid-American Conference men's basketball tournament | First round at campus sites Remainder at Quicken Loans Arena (Cleveland, Ohio) | Buffalo |
| Mid-Eastern Athletic Conference | North Carolina Central | Kendall Gray, Delaware State | Bobby Collins, Maryland Eastern Shore | 2015 MEAC men's basketball tournament | Norfolk Scope (Norfolk, Virginia) | Hampton |
| Missouri Valley Conference | Wichita State | Seth Tuttle, Northern Iowa | Ben Jacobson, Northern Iowa | 2015 Missouri Valley Conference men's basketball tournament | Scottrade Center (St. Louis, Missouri) | Northern Iowa |
| Mountain West Conference | Boise State & San Diego State | Derrick Marks, Boise State | Leon Rice, Boise State | 2015 Mountain West Conference men's basketball tournament | Thomas & Mack Center (Paradise, Nevada) | Wyoming |
| Northeast Conference | St. Francis Brooklyn | Jalen Cannon, St. Francis Brooklyn | Glenn Braica, St. Francis Brooklyn | 2015 Northeast Conference men's basketball tournament | Campus sites | Robert Morris |
| Ohio Valley Conference | Murray State (West); Belmont & Eastern Kentucky (East) | Cameron Payne, Murray State | Steve Prohm, Murray State | 2015 Ohio Valley Conference men's basketball tournament | Nashville Municipal Auditorium (Nashville, Tennessee) | Belmont |
| Pac-12 Conference | Arizona | Joe Young, Oregon | Dana Altman, Oregon | 2015 Pac-12 Conference men's basketball tournament | MGM Grand Garden Arena (Paradise, Nevada) | Arizona |
| Patriot League | Bucknell | Tim Kempton Jr., Lehigh | Dave Paulsen, Bucknell | 2015 Patriot League men's basketball tournament | Campus sites | Lafayette |
| Southeastern Conference | Kentucky | Bobby Portis, Arkansas | John Calipari, Kentucky | 2015 SEC men's basketball tournament | Bridgestone Arena (Nashville, Tennessee) | Kentucky |
| Southern Conference | Wofford | Karl Cochran, Wofford | Mike Young, Wofford | 2015 Southern Conference men's basketball tournament | U.S. Cellular Center (Asheville, North Carolina) | Wofford |
| Southland Conference | Stephen F. Austin | Thomas Walkup, Stephen F. Austin | Brad Underwood, Stephen F. Austin | 2015 Southland Conference men's basketball tournament | Leonard E. Merrell Center (Katy, Texas) | Stephen F. Austin |
| Southwestern Athletic Conference | Texas Southern | Madarious Gibbs, Texas Southern | Mike Davis, Texas Southern | 2015 SWAC men's basketball tournament | Toyota Center (Houston, Texas) | Texas Southern |
| The Summit League | North Dakota State & South Dakota State | Lawrence Alexander, North Dakota State | David Richman, North Dakota State | 2015 The Summit League men's basketball tournament | Denny Sanford PREMIER Center (Sioux Falls, South Dakota) | North Dakota State |
| Sun Belt Conference | Georgia State | R. J. Hunter, Georgia State | Keith Richard, Louisiana–Monroe | 2015 Sun Belt Conference men's basketball tournament | Lakefront Arena (New Orleans) | Georgia State |
| West Coast Conference | Gonzaga | Kevin Pangos, Gonzaga | Mark Few, Gonzaga | 2015 West Coast Conference men's basketball tournament | Orleans Arena (Paradise, Nevada) | Gonzaga |
| Western Athletic Conference | New Mexico State | Martez Harrison, UMKC | Marvin Menzies, New Mexico State | 2015 WAC men's basketball tournament | Orleans Arena (Paradise, Nevada) | New Mexico State |

==== Conference standings ====
2014–15 America East Conference men's basketball standings
| | Conf. | | | | Overall |
| Team | W | | L | PCT | W | | L | PCT |
|---|---|---|---|---|---|---|---|---|
| Albany † | 15 | – | 1 | .938 | 24 | – | 9 | .727 |
| Stony Brook | 12 | – | 4 | .750 | 23 | – | 12 | .657 |
| Vermont | 12 | – | 4 | .750 | 20 | – | 14 | .588 |
| New Hampshire | 11 | – | 5 | .688 | 19 | – | 13 | .594 |
| Hartford | 7 | – | 9 | .438 | 14 | – | 16 | .467 |
| UMass Lowell* | 6 | – | 10 | .375 | 12 | – | 17 | .414 |
| Binghamton | 5 | – | 11 | .313 | 6 | – | 26 | .188 |
| UMBC | 2 | – | 14 | .125 | 4 | – | 26 | .133 |
| Maine | 2 | – | 14 | .125 | 3 | – | 27 | .100 |
† 2015 America East tournament winner *ineligible for postseason play due to Div. I transition

2014–15 American Athletic Conference men's basketball standings
| | Conf. | | | | Overall |
| Team | W | | L | PCT | W | | L | PCT |
|---|---|---|---|---|---|---|---|---|
| No. 18 SMU † | 15 | – | 3 | .833 | 27 | – | 7 | .794 |
| Tulsa | 14 | – | 4 | .778 | 23 | – | 11 | .676 |
| Temple | 13 | – | 5 | .722 | 26 | – | 11 | .703 |
| Cincinnati | 13 | – | 5 | .722 | 23 | – | 11 | .676 |
| UConn | 10 | – | 8 | .556 | 20 | – | 15 | .571 |
| Memphis | 10 | – | 8 | .556 | 18 | – | 14 | .563 |
| Tulane | 6 | – | 12 | .333 | 15 | – | 16 | .484 |
| East Carolina | 6 | – | 12 | .333 | 14 | – | 19 | .424 |
| UCF | 5 | – | 13 | .278 | 12 | – | 18 | .400 |
| Houston | 4 | – | 14 | .222 | 13 | – | 19 | .406 |
| South Florida | 3 | – | 15 | .167 | 9 | – | 23 | .281 |
† The American Tournament winner Rankings from AP poll

2014–15 Atlantic 10 men's basketball standings
| | Conf. | | | | Overall |
| Team | W | | L | PCT | W | | L | PCT |
|---|---|---|---|---|---|---|---|---|
| Davidson | 14 | – | 4 | .778 | 24 | – | 8 | .750 |
| Dayton | 13 | – | 5 | .722 | 27 | – | 9 | .750 |
| Rhode Island | 13 | – | 5 | .722 | 23 | – | 10 | .697 |
| VCU † | 12 | – | 6 | .667 | 26 | – | 10 | .722 |
| Richmond | 12 | – | 6 | .667 | 21 | – | 14 | .600 |
| George Washington | 10 | – | 8 | .556 | 22 | – | 13 | .629 |
| St. Bonaventure | 10 | – | 8 | .556 | 18 | – | 13 | .581 |
| UMass | 10 | – | 8 | .556 | 17 | – | 15 | .531 |
| La Salle | 8 | – | 10 | .444 | 17 | – | 16 | .515 |
| Saint Joseph's | 7 | – | 11 | .389 | 13 | – | 18 | .419 |
| Duquesne | 6 | – | 12 | .333 | 12 | – | 19 | .387 |
| Fordham | 4 | – | 14 | .222 | 10 | – | 21 | .323 |
| George Mason | 4 | – | 14 | .222 | 9 | – | 22 | .290 |
| Saint Louis | 3 | – | 15 | .167 | 11 | – | 21 | .344 |
† 2015 A10 tournament winner Rankings from AP poll

2014–15 ACC men's basketball standings
| | Conf. | | | | Overall |
| Team | W | | L | PCT | W | | L | PCT |
|---|---|---|---|---|---|---|---|---|
| No. 6 Virginia | 16 | – | 2 | .889 | 30 | – | 4 | .882 |
| No. 4 Duke | 15 | – | 3 | .833 | 35 | – | 4 | .897 |
| No. 8 Notre Dame † | 14 | – | 4 | .778 | 32 | – | 6 | .842 |
| No. 15 North Carolina | 11 | – | 7 | .611 | 26 | – | 12 | .684 |
| Miami (FL) | 10 | – | 8 | .556 | 25 | – | 13 | .658 |
| NC State | 10 | – | 8 | .556 | 22 | – | 14 | .611 |
| Syracuse | 9 | – | 9 | .500 | 18 | – | 13 | .581 |
| Clemson | 8 | – | 10 | .444 | 16 | – | 15 | .516 |
| Florida State | 8 | – | 10 | .444 | 17 | – | 16 | .515 |
| Pittsburgh | 8 | – | 10 | .444 | 19 | – | 15 | .559 |
| Wake Forest | 5 | – | 13 | .278 | 13 | – | 19 | .406 |
| Boston College | 4 | – | 14 | .222 | 13 | – | 19 | .406 |
| Georgia Tech | 3 | – | 15 | .167 | 12 | – | 19 | .387 |
| Virginia Tech | 2 | – | 16 | .111 | 11 | – | 22 | .333 |
| No. 17 Louisville* | 0 | – | 6 | .000 | 0 | – | 8 | .000 |
† ACC tournament winner Rankings from AP poll *Louisville: 24 reg. season games, 4 postseason games vacated due to sanctions against the program; Disputed Record-(27-9)(12-6)

2014–15 Atlantic Sun men's basketball standings
| | Conf. | | | | Overall |
| Team | W | | L | PCT | W | | L | PCT |
|---|---|---|---|---|---|---|---|---|
| North Florida † | 12 | – | 2 | .857 | 23 | – | 12 | .657 |
| Florida Gulf Coast | 11 | – | 3 | .786 | 22 | – | 11 | .667 |
| USC Upstate | 8 | – | 6 | .571 | 24 | – | 12 | .667 |
| Lipscomb | 7 | – | 7 | .500 | 14 | – | 17 | .452 |
| Northern Kentucky* | 7 | – | 7 | .500 | 13 | – | 17 | .433 |
| Jacksonville | 4 | – | 10 | .286 | 10 | – | 22 | .313 |
| Kennesaw State | 4 | – | 10 | .286 | 10 | – | 22 | .313 |
| Stetson | 3 | – | 11 | .214 | 9 | – | 22 | .290 |
† 2015 Atlantic Sun Tournament winner *NKU was eligible for A-Sun Tourney, but not for postseason play due to Div. I transition

2014–15 Big East men's basketball standings
| | Conf. | | | | Overall |
| Team | W | | L | PCT | W | | L | PCT |
|---|---|---|---|---|---|---|---|---|
| No. 2 Villanova † | 16 | – | 2 | .889 | 33 | – | 3 | .917 |
| No. 22 Georgetown | 12 | – | 6 | .667 | 22 | – | 11 | .667 |
| No. 24 Butler | 12 | – | 6 | .667 | 23 | – | 11 | .676 |
| Providence | 11 | – | 7 | .611 | 22 | – | 12 | .647 |
| St. John's | 10 | – | 8 | .556 | 21 | – | 12 | .636 |
| Xavier | 9 | – | 9 | .500 | 23 | – | 14 | .622 |
| DePaul | 6 | – | 12 | .333 | 12 | – | 20 | .375 |
| Seton Hall | 6 | – | 12 | .333 | 16 | – | 15 | .516 |
| Marquette | 4 | – | 14 | .222 | 13 | – | 19 | .406 |
| Creighton | 4 | – | 14 | .222 | 14 | – | 19 | .424 |
† 2015 Big East tournament winner As of April 6, 2015; Rankings from AP poll

2014–15 Big Sky men's basketball standings
| | Conf. | | | | Overall |
| Team | W | | L | PCT | W | | L | PCT |
|---|---|---|---|---|---|---|---|---|
| Montana | 14 | – | 4 | .778 | 20 | – | 13 | .606 |
| Eastern Washington † | 14 | – | 4 | .778 | 26 | – | 9 | .743 |
| Sacramento State | 13 | – | 5 | .722 | 21 | – | 12 | .636 |
| Northern Arizona | 13 | – | 5 | .722 | 23 | – | 15 | .605 |
| Northern Colorado | 10 | – | 8 | .556 | 15 | – | 15 | .500 |
| Portland State | 9 | – | 9 | .500 | 15 | – | 14 | .517 |
| Idaho | 8 | – | 10 | .444 | 13 | – | 17 | .433 |
| Weber State | 8 | – | 10 | .444 | 13 | – | 17 | .433 |
| Southern Utah | 7 | – | 11 | .389 | 10 | – | 19 | .345 |
| North Dakota | 4 | – | 14 | .222 | 8 | – | 22 | .267 |
| Idaho State | 4 | – | 14 | .222 | 7 | – | 23 | .233 |
| Montana State | 4 | – | 14 | .222 | 7 | – | 23 | .233 |
† Conference tournament winner

2014–15 Big South men's basketball standings
| | Conf. | | | | Overall |
| Team | W | | L | PCT | W | | L | PCT |
|---|---|---|---|---|---|---|---|---|
| Charleston Southern | 13 | – | 5 | .722 | 19 | – | 12 | .613 |
| High Point | 13 | – | 5 | .722 | 23 | – | 10 | .697 |
| Coastal Carolina † | 12 | – | 6 | .667 | 24 | – | 10 | .706 |
| Radford | 12 | – | 6 | .667 | 22 | – | 12 | .647 |
| Winthrop | 12 | – | 6 | .667 | 19 | – | 13 | .594 |
| UNC Asheville | 10 | – | 8 | .556 | 15 | – | 16 | .484 |
| Gardner–Webb | 10 | – | 8 | .556 | 20 | – | 15 | .571 |
| Presbyterian | 6 | – | 12 | .333 | 10 | – | 22 | .313 |
| Longwood | 5 | – | 13 | .278 | 11 | – | 23 | .324 |
| Campbell | 4 | – | 14 | .222 | 10 | – | 22 | .313 |
| Liberty | 2 | – | 16 | .111 | 8 | – | 24 | .250 |
† 2015 Big South tournament winner

2014–15 Big Ten Conference men's basketball standings
| | Conf. | | | | Overall |
| Team | W | | L | PCT | W | | L | PCT |
|---|---|---|---|---|---|---|---|---|
| No. 3 Wisconsin † | 16 | – | 2 | .889 | 36 | – | 4 | .900 |
| No. 12 Maryland | 14 | – | 4 | .778 | 28 | – | 7 | .800 |
| No. 23 Michigan State | 12 | – | 6 | .667 | 27 | – | 12 | .692 |
| Iowa | 12 | – | 6 | .667 | 22 | – | 12 | .647 |
| Purdue | 12 | – | 6 | .667 | 21 | – | 13 | .618 |
| Ohio State | 11 | – | 7 | .611 | 24 | – | 11 | .686 |
| Indiana | 9 | – | 9 | .500 | 20 | – | 14 | .588 |
| Illinois | 9 | – | 9 | .500 | 19 | – | 14 | .576 |
| Michigan | 8 | – | 10 | .444 | 16 | – | 16 | .500 |
| Minnesota | 6 | – | 12 | .333 | 18 | – | 15 | .545 |
| Northwestern | 6 | – | 12 | .333 | 15 | – | 17 | .469 |
| Nebraska | 5 | – | 13 | .278 | 13 | – | 18 | .419 |
| Penn State | 4 | – | 14 | .222 | 18 | – | 16 | .529 |
| Rutgers | 2 | – | 16 | .111 | 10 | – | 22 | .313 |
† 2015 Big Ten tournament winner Rankings from AP poll

2014–15 Big 12 men's basketball standings
| | Conf. | | | | Overall |
| Team | W | | L | PCT | W | | L | PCT |
|---|---|---|---|---|---|---|---|---|
| No. 10 Kansas | 13 | – | 5 | .722 | 27 | – | 9 | .750 |
| No. 9 Iowa State † | 12 | – | 6 | .667 | 25 | – | 9 | .735 |
| No. 13 Oklahoma | 12 | – | 6 | .667 | 24 | – | 11 | .686 |
| No. 16 Baylor | 11 | – | 7 | .611 | 24 | – | 10 | .706 |
| No. 20 West Virginia | 11 | – | 7 | .611 | 25 | – | 10 | .714 |
| Oklahoma State | 8 | – | 10 | .444 | 18 | – | 14 | .563 |
| Texas | 8 | – | 10 | .444 | 20 | – | 14 | .588 |
| Kansas State | 8 | – | 10 | .444 | 15 | – | 17 | .469 |
| TCU | 4 | – | 14 | .222 | 18 | – | 15 | .545 |
| Texas Tech | 3 | – | 15 | .167 | 13 | – | 19 | .406 |
† 2015 Big 12 Tournament winner Rankings from AP poll

2014–15 Big West men's basketball standings
| | Conf. | | | | Overall |
| Team | W | | L | PCT | W | | L | PCT |
|---|---|---|---|---|---|---|---|---|
| UC Davis | 14 | – | 2 | .875 | 25 | – | 7 | .781 |
| UC Irvine † | 11 | – | 5 | .688 | 21 | – | 13 | .618 |
| UC Santa Barbara | 11 | – | 5 | .688 | 19 | – | 14 | .576 |
| Long Beach State | 10 | – | 6 | .625 | 16 | – | 17 | .485 |
| Hawai'i | 8 | – | 8 | .500 | 22 | – | 13 | .629 |
| UC Riverside | 7 | – | 9 | .438 | 14 | – | 17 | .452 |
| Cal Poly | 6 | – | 10 | .375 | 13 | – | 16 | .448 |
| Cal State Northridge | 4 | – | 12 | .250 | 9 | – | 24 | .273 |
| Cal State Fullerton | 1 | – | 15 | .063 | 9 | – | 22 | .290 |
† 2015 Big West tournament winner

2014–15 CAA men's basketball standings
| | Conf. | | | | Overall |
| Team | W | | L | PCT | W | | L | PCT |
|---|---|---|---|---|---|---|---|---|
| William & Mary | 12 | – | 6 | .667 | 20 | – | 13 | .606 |
| UNC Wilmington | 12 | – | 6 | .667 | 18 | – | 14 | .563 |
| Northeastern † | 12 | – | 6 | .667 | 23 | – | 12 | .657 |
| James Madison | 12 | – | 6 | .667 | 19 | – | 14 | .576 |
| Hofstra | 10 | – | 8 | .556 | 20 | – | 14 | .588 |
| Delaware | 9 | – | 9 | .500 | 10 | – | 20 | .333 |
| Drexel | 9 | – | 9 | .500 | 11 | – | 19 | .367 |
| Elon | 6 | – | 12 | .333 | 15 | – | 18 | .455 |
| Towson | 5 | – | 13 | .278 | 12 | – | 20 | .375 |
| College of Charleston | 3 | – | 15 | .167 | 9 | – | 24 | .273 |
† 2015 CAA tournament winner Rankings from AP poll

2014–15 Conference USA men's basketball standings
| | Conf. | | | | Overall |
| Team | W | | L | PCT | W | | L | PCT |
|---|---|---|---|---|---|---|---|---|
| Louisiana Tech | 15 | – | 3 | .833 | 27 | – | 9 | .750 |
| Old Dominion | 13 | – | 5 | .722 | 27 | – | 8 | .771 |
| UTEP | 13 | – | 5 | .722 | 22 | – | 11 | .667 |
| WKU | 12 | – | 6 | .667 | 20 | – | 12 | .625 |
| UAB † | 12 | – | 6 | .667 | 20 | – | 16 | .556 |
| Middle Tennessee | 9 | – | 9 | .500 | 19 | – | 17 | .528 |
| FIU | 8 | – | 10 | .444 | 16 | – | 17 | .485 |
| UTSA | 8 | – | 10 | .444 | 14 | – | 16 | .467 |
| North Texas | 8 | – | 10 | .444 | 14 | – | 17 | .452 |
| Rice | 8 | – | 10 | .444 | 12 | – | 20 | .375 |
| Charlotte | 7 | – | 11 | .389 | 14 | – | 18 | .438 |
| Marshall | 7 | – | 11 | .389 | 11 | – | 21 | .344 |
| Southern Miss* | 4 | – | 14 | .222 | 9 | – | 20 | .310 |
| Florida Atlantic | 2 | – | 16 | .111 | 9 | – | 20 | .310 |
† 2015 C-USA Tournament winner *Ineligible for postseason play due to self-imposed postseason ban

2014–15 Horizon League men's basketball standings
| | Conf. | | | | Overall |
| Team | W | | L | PCT | W | | L | PCT |
|---|---|---|---|---|---|---|---|---|
| Valparaiso † | 13 | – | 3 | .813 | 28 | – | 6 | .824 |
| Green Bay | 12 | – | 4 | .750 | 24 | – | 9 | .727 |
| Oakland | 11 | – | 5 | .688 | 16 | – | 17 | .485 |
| Cleveland State | 11 | – | 5 | .688 | 19 | – | 15 | .559 |
| Milwaukee * | 9 | – | 7 | .563 | 14 | – | 16 | .467 |
| Detroit | 7 | – | 9 | .438 | 15 | – | 18 | .455 |
| UIC | 4 | – | 12 | .250 | 10 | – | 24 | .294 |
| Wright State | 3 | – | 13 | .188 | 11 | – | 20 | .355 |
| Youngstown State | 2 | – | 14 | .125 | 11 | – | 21 | .344 |
† 2015 Horizon League Tournament winner * Ineligible for postseason play due to APR penalties

2014–15 Ivy League men's basketball standings
| | Conf. | | | | Overall |
| Team | W | | L | PCT | W | | L | PCT |
|---|---|---|---|---|---|---|---|---|
| x-Harvard † | 11 | – | 3 | .786 | 22 | – | 8 | .733 |
| x-Yale | 11 | – | 3 | .786 | 22 | – | 10 | .688 |
| Princeton | 9 | – | 5 | .643 | 16 | – | 14 | .533 |
| Dartmouth | 7 | – | 7 | .500 | 14 | – | 15 | .483 |
| Columbia | 5 | – | 9 | .357 | 13 | – | 15 | .464 |
| Cornell | 5 | – | 9 | .357 | 13 | – | 17 | .433 |
| Penn | 4 | – | 10 | .286 | 9 | – | 19 | .321 |
| Brown | 4 | – | 10 | .286 | 13 | – | 18 | .419 |
x – Ivy League co-champions † – NCAA participant

2014–15 MAAC men's basketball standings
| | Conf. | | | | Overall |
| Team | W | | L | PCT | W | | L | PCT |
|---|---|---|---|---|---|---|---|---|
| Iona | 17 | – | 3 | .850 | 26 | – | 9 | .743 |
| Rider | 15 | – | 5 | .750 | 21 | – | 12 | .636 |
| Manhattan † | 13 | – | 7 | .650 | 19 | – | 14 | .576 |
| Monmouth | 13 | – | 7 | .650 | 18 | – | 15 | .545 |
| Canisius | 11 | – | 9 | .550 | 18 | – | 15 | .545 |
| Quinnipiac | 9 | – | 11 | .450 | 15 | – | 15 | .500 |
| Saint Peter's | 8 | – | 12 | .400 | 16 | – | 18 | .471 |
| Siena | 7 | – | 13 | .350 | 11 | – | 20 | .355 |
| Niagara | 7 | – | 13 | .350 | 8 | – | 22 | .267 |
| Fairfield | 5 | – | 15 | .250 | 7 | – | 24 | .226 |
| Marist | 5 | – | 15 | .250 | 7 | – | 25 | .219 |
† 2015 MAAC tournament winner

2014–15 Mid-American Conference men's basketball standings
| | Conf. | | | | Overall |
| Team | W | | L | PCT | W | | L | PCT |
|---|---|---|---|---|---|---|---|---|
East
| Buffalo † | 12 | – | 6 | .667 | 23 | – | 10 | .697 |
| Kent State | 12 | – | 6 | .667 | 23 | – | 12 | .657 |
| Bowling Green | 11 | – | 7 | .611 | 21 | – | 12 | .636 |
| Akron | 9 | – | 9 | .500 | 21 | – | 14 | .600 |
| Miami | 8 | – | 10 | .444 | 13 | – | 19 | .406 |
| Ohio | 5 | – | 13 | .278 | 10 | – | 20 | .333 |
West
| Central Michigan | 12 | – | 6 | .667 | 23 | – | 9 | .719 |
| Toledo | 11 | – | 7 | .611 | 20 | – | 13 | .606 |
| Western Michigan | 10 | – | 8 | .556 | 20 | – | 14 | .588 |
| Eastern Michigan | 8 | – | 10 | .444 | 21 | – | 14 | .600 |
| Northern Illinois | 8 | – | 10 | .444 | 14 | – | 16 | .467 |
| Ball State | 2 | – | 16 | .111 | 7 | – | 23 | .233 |
† 2015 MAC tournament winner

2014–15 MEAC men's basketball standings
| | Conf. | | | | Overall |
| Team | W | | L | PCT | W | | L | PCT |
|---|---|---|---|---|---|---|---|---|
| North Carolina Central | 16 | – | 0 | 1.000 | 25 | – | 8 | .758 |
| Norfolk State | 12 | – | 4 | .750 | 20 | – | 14 | .588 |
| Maryland Eastern Shore | 11 | – | 5 | .688 | 18 | – | 15 | .545 |
| Howard | 10 | – | 6 | .625 | 16 | – | 16 | .500 |
| Delaware State | 9 | – | 7 | .563 | 18 | – | 18 | .500 |
| Hampton † | 8 | – | 8 | .500 | 17 | – | 18 | .486 |
| South Carolina State | 7 | – | 9 | .438 | 11 | – | 22 | .333 |
| Bethune–Cookman | 7 | – | 9 | .438 | 11 | – | 21 | .344 |
| Coppin State | 6 | – | 10 | .375 | 8 | – | 23 | .258 |
| North Carolina A&T | 6 | – | 10 | .375 | 9 | – | 23 | .281 |
| Morgan State | 5 | – | 11 | .313 | 7 | – | 24 | .226 |
| Savannah State | 5 | – | 11 | .313 | 9 | – | 22 | .290 |
| Florida A&M | 2 | – | 14 | .125 | 2 | – | 27 | .069 |
† 2015 MEAC tournament winner

2014–15 Missouri Valley Conference men's basketball standings
| | Conf. | | | | Overall |
| Team | W | | L | PCT | W | | L | PCT |
|---|---|---|---|---|---|---|---|---|
| No. 14 Wichita State | 17 | – | 1 | .944 | 30 | – | 5 | .857 |
| No. 11 Northern Iowa † | 16 | – | 2 | .889 | 31 | – | 4 | .886 |
| Indiana State | 11 | – | 7 | .611 | 15 | – | 16 | .484 |
| Illinois State | 11 | – | 7 | .611 | 22 | – | 13 | .629 |
| Evansville | 9 | – | 9 | .500 | 24 | – | 12 | .667 |
| Loyola Chicago | 8 | – | 10 | .444 | 24 | – | 13 | .649 |
| Drake | 6 | – | 12 | .333 | 9 | – | 22 | .290 |
| Missouri State | 5 | – | 13 | .278 | 11 | – | 20 | .355 |
| Southern Illinois | 4 | – | 14 | .222 | 12 | – | 21 | .364 |
| Bradley | 3 | – | 15 | .167 | 9 | – | 24 | .273 |
† 2015 MVC tournament winner Rankings from AP poll

2014–15 Mountain West Conference men's basketball standings
| | Conf. | | | | Overall |
| Team | W | | L | PCT | W | | L | PCT |
|---|---|---|---|---|---|---|---|---|
| Boise State | 14 | – | 4 | .778 | 25 | – | 9 | .735 |
| San Diego State | 14 | – | 4 | .778 | 27 | – | 9 | .750 |
| Colorado State | 13 | – | 5 | .722 | 27 | – | 7 | .794 |
| Wyoming † | 11 | – | 7 | .611 | 25 | – | 10 | .714 |
| Utah State | 11 | – | 7 | .611 | 18 | – | 13 | .581 |
| Fresno State | 10 | – | 8 | .556 | 15 | – | 17 | .469 |
| UNLV | 8 | – | 10 | .444 | 18 | – | 15 | .545 |
| New Mexico | 7 | – | 11 | .389 | 15 | – | 16 | .484 |
| Air Force | 6 | – | 12 | .333 | 14 | – | 17 | .452 |
| Nevada | 5 | – | 13 | .278 | 9 | – | 22 | .290 |
| San Jose State* | 0 | – | 18 | .000 | 2 | – | 28 | .067 |
† 2015 MWC tournament winner *Ineligible for postseason play due to APR penalties

2014–15 Northeast Conference men's basketball standings
| | Conf. | | | | Overall |
| Team | W | | L | PCT | W | | L | PCT |
|---|---|---|---|---|---|---|---|---|
| St. Francis Brooklyn | 15 | – | 3 | .833 | 23 | – | 12 | .657 |
| Robert Morris † | 12 | – | 6 | .667 | 20 | – | 15 | .571 |
| Bryant | 12 | – | 6 | .667 | 16 | – | 15 | .516 |
| Mount St. Mary's | 11 | – | 7 | .611 | 15 | – | 15 | .500 |
| Saint Francis | 9 | – | 9 | .500 | 16 | – | 16 | .500 |
| Sacred Heart | 9 | – | 9 | .500 | 15 | – | 17 | .469 |
| LIU Brooklyn | 8 | – | 10 | .444 | 12 | – | 18 | .400 |
| Wagner | 8 | – | 10 | .444 | 10 | – | 20 | .333 |
| Fairleigh Dickinson | 3 | – | 15 | .167 | 8 | – | 21 | .276 |
| Central Connecticut | 3 | – | 15 | .167 | 5 | – | 26 | .161 |
† 2015 NEC tournament winner

2014–15 Ohio Valley Conference men's basketball standings
| | Conf. | | | | Overall |
| Team | W | | L | PCT | W | | L | PCT |
|---|---|---|---|---|---|---|---|---|
East
| Belmont † | 11 | – | 5 | .688 | 22 | – | 11 | .667 |
| Eastern Kentucky | 11 | – | 5 | .688 | 21 | – | 12 | .636 |
| Morehead State | 10 | – | 6 | .625 | 17 | – | 17 | .500 |
| Jacksonville State | 5 | – | 11 | .313 | 12 | – | 19 | .387 |
| Tennessee Tech | 4 | – | 12 | .250 | 12 | – | 18 | .400 |
| Tennessee State | 2 | – | 14 | .125 | 5 | – | 26 | .161 |
West
| Murray State | 16 | – | 0 | 1.000 | 29 | – | 6 | .829 |
| UT Martin | 10 | – | 6 | .625 | 21 | – | 13 | .618 |
| Eastern Illinois | 9 | – | 7 | .563 | 18 | – | 15 | .545 |
| SIU Edwardsville | 8 | – | 8 | .500 | 12 | – | 16 | .429 |
| Southeast Missouri St. | 7 | – | 9 | .438 | 13 | – | 17 | .433 |
| Austin Peay | 3 | – | 13 | .188 | 8 | – | 22 | .267 |
† 2015 OVC tournament winner Rankings from AP poll

2014–15 Pac-12 Conference men's basketball standings
| | Conf. | | | | Overall |
| Team | W | | L | PCT | W | | L | PCT |
|---|---|---|---|---|---|---|---|---|
| No. 5 Arizona † | 16 | – | 2 | .889 | 34 | – | 4 | .895 |
| No. 25 Oregon | 13 | – | 5 | .722 | 26 | – | 10 | .722 |
| No. 19 Utah | 13 | – | 5 | .722 | 26 | – | 9 | .743 |
| UCLA | 11 | – | 7 | .611 | 22 | – | 14 | .611 |
| Stanford | 9 | – | 9 | .500 | 24 | – | 13 | .649 |
| Arizona State | 9 | – | 9 | .500 | 18 | – | 16 | .529 |
| Oregon State | 8 | – | 10 | .444 | 17 | – | 14 | .548 |
| California | 7 | – | 11 | .389 | 18 | – | 15 | .545 |
| Colorado | 7 | – | 11 | .389 | 16 | – | 18 | .471 |
| Washington State | 7 | – | 11 | .389 | 13 | – | 18 | .419 |
| Washington | 5 | – | 13 | .278 | 16 | – | 15 | .516 |
| USC | 3 | – | 15 | .167 | 12 | – | 20 | .375 |
† Pac-12 Tournament winner Rankings from AP poll

2014–15 Patriot League men's basketball standings
| | Conf. | | | | Overall |
| Team | W | | L | PCT | W | | L | PCT |
|---|---|---|---|---|---|---|---|---|
| Bucknell | 13 | – | 5 | .722 | 19 | – | 15 | .559 |
| Colgate | 12 | – | 6 | .667 | 16 | – | 17 | .485 |
| Lehigh | 10 | – | 8 | .556 | 16 | – | 14 | .533 |
| Lafayette † | 9 | – | 9 | .500 | 20 | – | 13 | .606 |
| Boston University | 9 | – | 9 | .500 | 13 | – | 17 | .433 |
| American | 8 | – | 10 | .444 | 17 | – | 16 | .515 |
| Holy Cross | 8 | – | 10 | .444 | 14 | – | 16 | .467 |
| Navy | 8 | – | 10 | .444 | 13 | – | 19 | .406 |
| Loyola (MD) | 7 | – | 11 | .389 | 11 | – | 19 | .367 |
| Army | 6 | – | 12 | .333 | 15 | – | 15 | .500 |
† 2015 Patriot League tournament winner

2014–15 Southeastern Conference men's basketball standings
| | Conf. | | | | Overall |
| Team | W | | L | PCT | W | | L | PCT |
|---|---|---|---|---|---|---|---|---|
| No. 1 Kentucky † | 18 | – | 0 | 1.000 | 38 | – | 1 | .974 |
| No. 21 Arkansas | 13 | – | 5 | .722 | 27 | – | 9 | .750 |
| LSU | 11 | – | 7 | .611 | 22 | – | 11 | .667 |
| Georgia | 11 | – | 7 | .611 | 21 | – | 12 | .636 |
| Texas A&M | 11 | – | 7 | .611 | 21 | – | 12 | .636 |
| Ole Miss | 11 | – | 7 | .611 | 21 | – | 13 | .618 |
| Vanderbilt | 9 | – | 9 | .500 | 21 | – | 14 | .600 |
| Alabama | 8 | – | 10 | .444 | 19 | – | 15 | .559 |
| Florida | 8 | – | 10 | .444 | 16 | – | 17 | .485 |
| Tennessee | 7 | – | 11 | .389 | 16 | – | 16 | .500 |
| South Carolina | 6 | – | 12 | .333 | 17 | – | 16 | .515 |
| Mississippi State | 6 | – | 12 | .333 | 13 | – | 19 | .406 |
| Auburn | 4 | – | 14 | .222 | 15 | – | 20 | .429 |
| Missouri | 3 | – | 15 | .167 | 9 | – | 23 | .281 |
† 2015 SEC tournament winner Rankings from AP poll

2014–15 Southern Conference men's basketball standings
| | Conf. | | | | Overall |
| Team | W | | L | PCT | W | | L | PCT |
|---|---|---|---|---|---|---|---|---|
| Wofford † | 16 | – | 2 | .889 | 28 | – | 7 | .800 |
| Chattanooga | 15 | – | 3 | .833 | 22 | – | 10 | .688 |
| Mercer | 12 | – | 6 | .667 | 19 | – | 16 | .543 |
| Western Carolina | 9 | – | 9 | .500 | 15 | – | 17 | .469 |
| East Tennessee State | 8 | – | 10 | .444 | 16 | – | 14 | .533 |
| VMI | 7 | – | 11 | .389 | 11 | – | 19 | .367 |
| Samford | 6 | – | 12 | .333 | 13 | – | 19 | .406 |
| The Citadel | 6 | – | 12 | .333 | 11 | – | 19 | .367 |
| UNC Greensboro | 6 | – | 12 | .333 | 11 | – | 22 | .333 |
| Furman | 5 | – | 13 | .278 | 11 | – | 22 | .333 |
† 2015 SoCon Tournament winner

2014–15 Southland Conference men's basketball standings
| | Conf. | | | | Overall |
| Team | W | | L | PCT | W | | L | PCT |
|---|---|---|---|---|---|---|---|---|
| Stephen F. Austin † | 17 | – | 1 | .944 | 29 | – | 5 | .853 |
| Sam Houston State | 15 | – | 3 | .833 | 26 | – | 9 | .743 |
| Texas A&M–CC | 13 | – | 5 | .722 | 20 | – | 14 | .588 |
| Northwestern State | 13 | – | 5 | .722 | 19 | – | 13 | .594 |
| Incarnate Word** | 10 | – | 8 | .556 | 18 | – | 11 | .621 |
| Lamar* | 9 | – | 9 | .500 | 15 | – | 15 | .500 |
| McNeese State | 8 | – | 10 | .444 | 15 | – | 16 | .484 |
| Houston Baptist* | 7 | – | 11 | .389 | 12 | – | 16 | .429 |
| Nicholls State | 7 | – | 11 | .389 | 10 | – | 19 | .345 |
| New Orleans | 6 | – | 12 | .333 | 11 | – | 18 | .379 |
| Southeastern Louisiana | 6 | – | 12 | .333 | 9 | – | 23 | .281 |
| Abilene Christian** | 4 | – | 14 | .222 | 10 | – | 21 | .323 |
| Central Arkansas* | 2 | – | 16 | .111 | 2 | – | 27 | .069 |
† 2015 Southland tournament winner * ineligible for postseason due to APR penalties ** ineligible for postseason due to Div. I transition

2014–15 SWAC men's basketball standings
| | Conf. | | | | Overall |
| Team | W | | L | PCT | W | | L | PCT |
|---|---|---|---|---|---|---|---|---|
| Texas Southern † | 16 | – | 2 | .889 | 22 | – | 13 | .629 |
| Alabama State* | 14 | – | 4 | .778 | 19 | – | 10 | .655 |
| Southern* | 13 | – | 5 | .722 | 18 | – | 17 | .514 |
| Prairie View A&M | 12 | – | 6 | .667 | 15 | – | 18 | .455 |
| Arkansas–Pine Bluff* | 9 | – | 9 | .500 | 12 | – | 20 | .375 |
| Jackson State | 9 | – | 9 | .500 | 11 | – | 21 | .344 |
| Alabama A&M | 8 | – | 10 | .444 | 9 | – | 20 | .310 |
| Mississippi Valley State | 5 | – | 13 | .278 | 6 | – | 26 | .188 |
| Alcorn State | 4 | – | 14 | .222 | 6 | – | 26 | .188 |
| Grambling State | 0 | – | 18 | .000 | 2 | – | 27 | .069 |
† 2015 SWAC tournament winner *ineligible for postseason play due to NCAA violations

2014–15 Summit League men's basketball standings
| | Conf. | | | | Overall |
| Team | W | | L | PCT | W | | L | PCT |
|---|---|---|---|---|---|---|---|---|
| North Dakota State † | 12 | – | 4 | .750 | 23 | – | 10 | .697 |
| South Dakota State | 12 | – | 4 | .750 | 24 | – | 11 | .686 |
| Oral Roberts | 10 | – | 6 | .625 | 19 | – | 15 | .559 |
| IPFW | 9 | – | 7 | .563 | 16 | – | 15 | .516 |
| South Dakota | 9 | – | 7 | .563 | 17 | – | 16 | .515 |
| Denver | 6 | – | 10 | .375 | 12 | – | 18 | .400 |
| IUPUI | 6 | – | 10 | .375 | 10 | – | 21 | .323 |
| Omaha* | 5 | – | 11 | .313 | 12 | – | 17 | .414 |
| Western Illinois | 3 | – | 13 | .188 | 8 | – | 20 | .286 |
† 2015 Summit League Tournament winner *ineligible for postseason play due to Div. I transition

2014–15 Sun Belt Conference men's basketball standings
| | Conf. | | | | Overall |
| Team | W | | L | PCT | W | | L | PCT |
|---|---|---|---|---|---|---|---|---|
| Georgia State † | 15 | – | 5 | .750 | 25 | – | 10 | .714 |
| Georgia Southern | 14 | – | 6 | .700 | 22 | – | 9 | .710 |
| Louisiana–Monroe | 14 | – | 6 | .700 | 24 | – | 14 | .632 |
| Louisiana–Lafayette | 13 | – | 7 | .650 | 22 | – | 14 | .611 |
| Texas–Arlington | 10 | – | 10 | .500 | 16 | – | 15 | .516 |
| Appalachian State* | 9 | – | 11 | .450 | 12 | – | 17 | .414 |
| South Alabama | 9 | – | 11 | .450 | 12 | – | 21 | .364 |
| Arkansas–Little Rock | 8 | – | 12 | .400 | 13 | – | 18 | .419 |
| Texas State | 7 | – | 13 | .350 | 14 | – | 17 | .452 |
| Arkansas State | 6 | – | 14 | .300 | 11 | – | 18 | .379 |
| Troy | 5 | – | 15 | .250 | 10 | – | 19 | .345 |
† 2015 Sun Belt Conference tournament winner *ineligible for postseason play due to APR penalties

2014–15 West Coast Conference men's basketball standings
| | Conf. | | | | Overall |
| Team | W | | L | PCT | W | | L | PCT |
|---|---|---|---|---|---|---|---|---|
| No. 7 Gonzaga † | 17 | – | 1 | .944 | 35 | – | 3 | .921 |
| BYU | 13 | – | 5 | .722 | 25 | – | 10 | .714 |
| Saint Mary's | 13 | – | 5 | .722 | 21 | – | 10 | .677 |
| Pepperdine | 10 | – | 8 | .556 | 18 | – | 14 | .563 |
| San Diego | 8 | – | 10 | .444 | 15 | – | 16 | .484 |
| Portland | 7 | – | 11 | .389 | 17 | – | 16 | .515 |
| Santa Clara | 7 | – | 11 | .389 | 14 | – | 18 | .438 |
| San Francisco | 7 | – | 11 | .389 | 14 | – | 18 | .438 |
| Pacific | 4 | – | 14 | .222 | 12 | – | 19 | .387 |
| Loyola Marymount | 4 | – | 14 | .222 | 8 | – | 23 | .258 |
† Conference tournament winner Rankings from AP poll

2014–15 WAC men's basketball standings
| | Conf. | | | | Overall |
| Team | W | | L | PCT | W | | L | PCT |
|---|---|---|---|---|---|---|---|---|
| New Mexico State † | 13 | – | 1 | .929 | 23 | – | 11 | .676 |
| Grand Canyon * | 8 | – | 6 | .571 | 17 | – | 15 | .531 |
| UMKC | 8 | – | 6 | .571 | 14 | – | 19 | .424 |
| Seattle | 7 | – | 7 | .500 | 18 | – | 16 | .529 |
| Cal State Bakersfield | 7 | – | 7 | .500 | 14 | – | 19 | .424 |
| Utah Valley | 5 | – | 9 | .357 | 11 | – | 19 | .367 |
| Chicago State | 4 | – | 10 | .286 | 8 | – | 24 | .250 |
| Texas–Pan American | 4 | – | 10 | .286 | 10 | – | 21 | .323 |
† 2015 WAC tournament winner * ineligible due to transition from NCAA Division II.

=== Division I independents ===
One school played as a Division I independent.

2014–15 NCAA Division I men's basketball independents standings
| | Conf. | | | | Overall |
| Team | W | | L | PCT | W | | L | PCT |
|---|---|---|---|---|---|---|---|---|
| NJIT | | – | | – | 21 | – | 12 | .636 |

=== Informal championships ===
| Conference | Regular season winner | Most Valuable Player |
|---|---|---|
| Philadelphia Big 5 | Villanova | Darrun Hilliard, Villanova |

Villanova finished with a 4–0 record in head-to-head competition among the Philadelphia Big 5.

=== Statistical leaders ===
Source for additional stats categories

| Points per game | | | Rebounds per game | | | Assists per game | | | Steals per game | | |
| Player | School | PPG | Player | School | RPG | Player | School | APG | Player | School | SPG |
| Tyler Harvey | Eastern Washington | 23.1 | Alan Williams | UC Santa Barbara | 11.8 | Jalan West | Northwestern State | 7.7 | Corey Walden | Eastern Kentucky | 3.09 |
| Zeek Woodley | Northwestern State | 22.2 | Kendall Gray | Delaware State | 11.8 | Kahlil Felder | Oakland | 7.6 | Gary Payton II | Oregon State | 3.06 |
| Tyler Haws | BYU | 22.2 | Jameel Warney | Stony Brook | 11.7 | Kris Dunn | Providence | 7.5 | Roderick Bobbitt | Hawaiʻi | 2.86 |
| Damion Lee | Drexel | 21.4 | Rico Gathers | Baylor | 11.6 | Tyler Strange | Gardner–Webb | 7.4 | Kevin Hardy | McNeese State | 2.74 |
| Saah Nimley | Charleston Southern | 21.4 | Shevon Thompson | George Mason | 11.3 | Speedy Smith | Louisiana Tech | 7.4 | Kris Dunn | Providence | 2.73 |

| Blocked shots per game | | | Field goal percentage | | | Three-point field goal percentage | | | Free throw percentage | | |
| Player | School | BPG | Player | School | FG% | Player | School | 3FG% | Player | School | FT% |
| Jordan Mickey | LSU | 3.65 | Evan Bradds | Belmont | 68.8 | Corey Hawkins | UC Davis | 48.8 | Riley Grabau | Wyoming | 93.9 |
| Amida Brimah | UConn | 3.46 | Jahlil Okafor | Duke | 66.4 | Quincy Taylor | Longwood | 48.0 | Joe Young | Oregon | 92.5 |
| Austin Nichols | Memphis | 3.44 | Jordan Parks | North Carolina Central | 66.0 | Alex Anderson | UT Martin | 48.0 | Andrew Rowsey | UNC Asheville | 92.1 |
| Justin Tuoyo | Chattanooga | 3.25 | Rashid Gaston | Norfolk State | 62.0 | John Simons | Central Michigan | 45.5 | Johnny Dee | San Diego | 91.9 |
| Chris Obekpa | St. John's | 3.13 | Zach Auguste | Notre Dame | 61.9 | Daniel Dixon | William & Mary | 45.1 | Four McGlynn | Towson | 91/7 |

== Postseason tournaments ==
=== NCAA tournament ===
Final Four – Lucas Oil Stadium in Indianapolis, Indiana

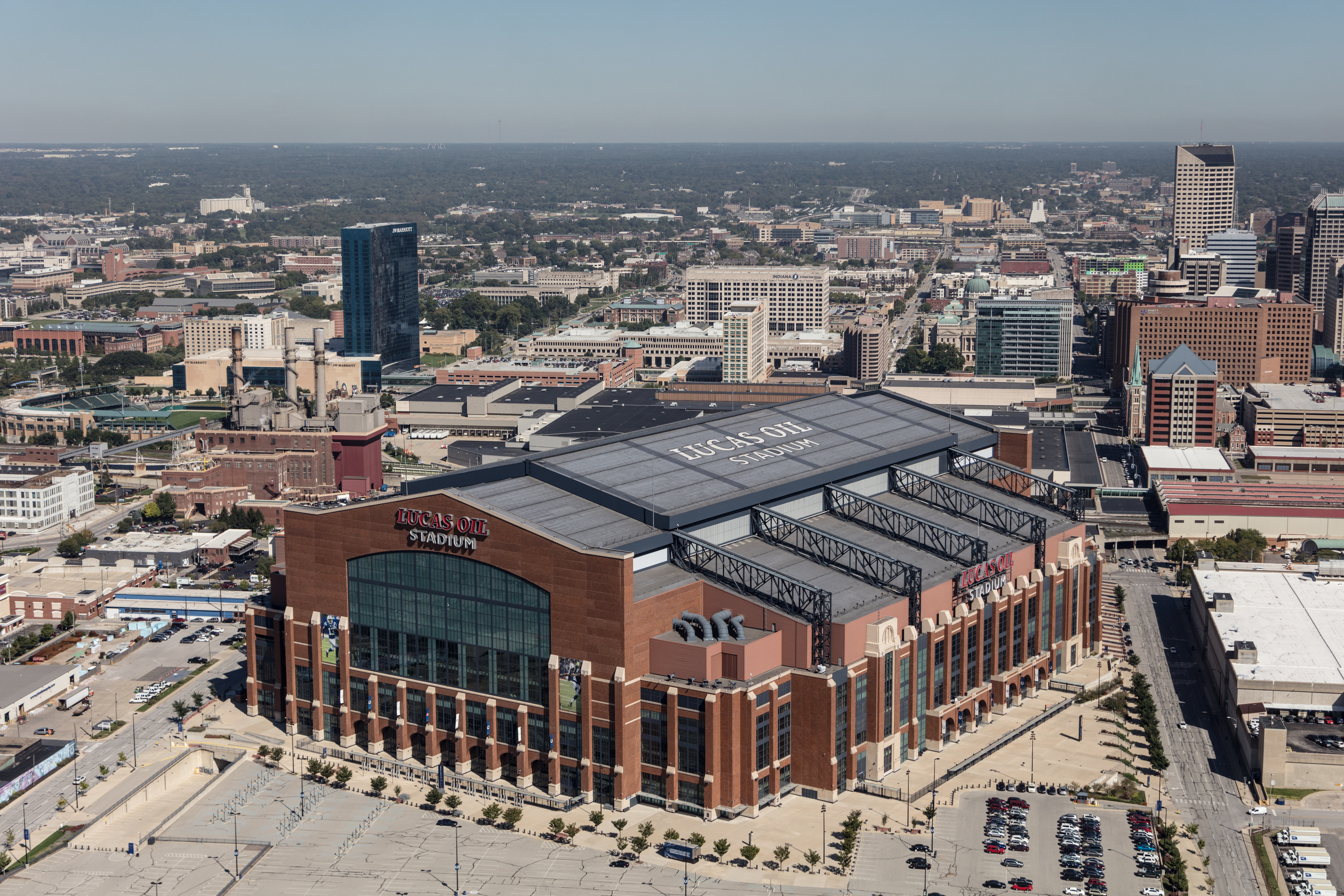
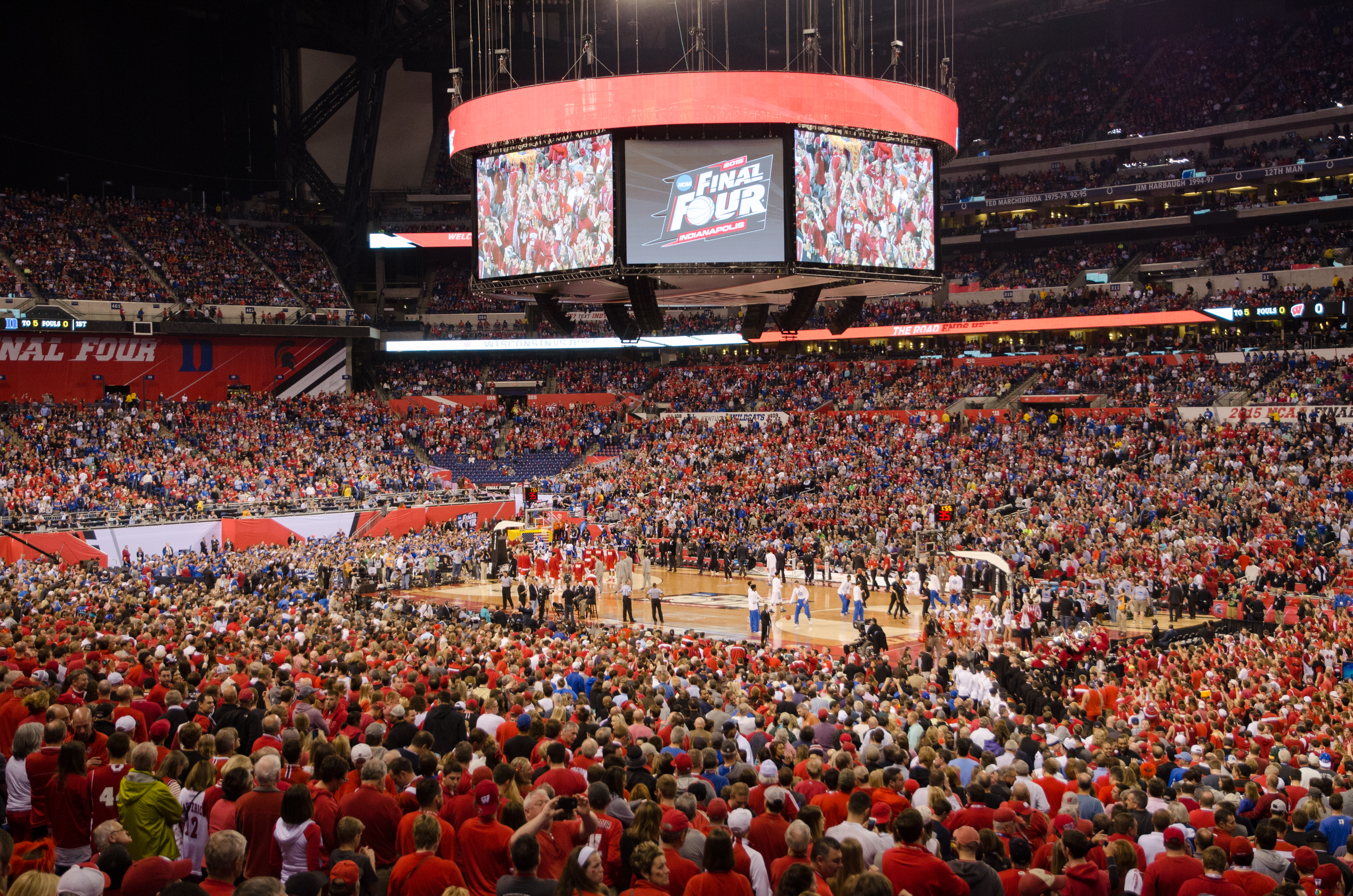
Lucas Oil Stadium in Indianapolis, Indiana, hosted the NCAA men's Final Four.

National Semifinals; April 4
MW1 | Kentucky | 64
W1 | Wisconsin | 71
E7 | Michigan State | 61
S1 | Duke | 81

National Championship Game; April 6
W1 | Wisconsin | 63
S1 | Duke | 68

==== Tournament upsets ====
For this list, a "major upset" is defined as a win by a team seeded seven or more spots below its defeated opponent.

| Date | Winner | Score | Loser | Region | Round |
|---|---|---|---|---|---|
| March 19 | UAB (14) | 60–59 | Iowa State (3) | South | Round of 64 |
| March 19 | Georgia State (14) | 57–56 | Baylor (3) | West | Round of 64 |
| March 21 | NC State (8) | 81–78 | Villanova (1) | East | Round of 32 |

=== National Invitation tournament ===
After the NCAA tournament field is announced, the NCAA invited 32 teams to participate in the National Invitation Tournament. The tournament began on March 17, 2015 with all games prior to the semifinals played on campus sites. The semifinals and final were held on March 31 and April 2 at Madison Square Garden in New York City.

Semifinals; March 31
1 | Temple | 57
2 | Miami (FL) | 60
2 | Stanford | 67
1 | Old Dominion | 60

Championship game April 2
2 | Miami (FL) | 64
2 | Stanford | 66^{OT}

=== College Basketball Invitational ===
The sixth College Basketball Invitational (CBI) Tournament began on March 17, 2015 and ended with Loyola-Chicago's two-game sweep of Louisiana-Monroe. This tournament featured 16 teams who were left out of the NCAA tournament and NIT.

Semifinals; March 25
Loyola-Chicago | 63
Seattle | 48
Louisiana–Monroe | 71
Vermont | 65

Championship Series; March 31, April 1
Loyola-Chicago | 65 | 63 | –
Louisiana–Monroe | 58 | 62 | –

=== CollegeInsider.com Postseason Tournament ===
The fifth CollegeInsider.com Postseason Tournament began on March 16 and ended with that championship game on April 2. The Evansville Purple Aces won their first postseason tournament, defeating Northern Arizona in the final. This tournament places an emphasis on selecting successful teams from "mid-major" conferences who were left out of the NCAA tournament and NIT. 32 teams participated in this tournament.

Semifinals; March 31
NJIT | 61
Northern Arizona | 68
Tennessee–Martin | 66
Evansville | 79

Championship; April 2
Northern Arizona | 65
Evansville | 71

== Award winners ==
=== Consensus All-American teams ===
The following players are recognized as the 2015 Consensus All-Americans:

Consensus First Team
| Player | Position | Class | Team |
|---|---|---|---|
| Willie Cauley-Stein | PF | Junior | Kentucky |
| Jerian Grant | PG/SG | Senior | Notre Dame |
| Frank Kaminsky | C/PF | Senior | Wisconsin |
| Jahlil Okafor | C | Freshman | Duke |
| D'Angelo Russell | PG/SG | Freshman | Ohio State |

Consensus Second Team
| Player | Position | Class | Team |
|---|---|---|---|
| Malcolm Brogdon | SG | Junior | Virginia |
| Bobby Portis | PF | Sophomore | Arkansas |
| Karl-Anthony Towns | C | Freshman | Kentucky |
| Seth Tuttle | PF | Senior | Northern Iowa |
| Kyle Wiltjer | PF | Junior | Gonzaga |
| Delon Wright | SG/PG | Senior | Utah |

=== Major player of the year awards ===
- Wooden Award: Frank Kaminsky, Wisconsin
- Naismith Award: Frank Kaminsky, Wisconsin
- Associated Press Player of the Year: Frank Kaminsky, Wisconsin
- NABC Player of the Year: Frank Kaminsky, Wisconsin
- Oscar Robertson Trophy (USBWA): Frank Kaminsky, Wisconsin
- Sporting News Player of the Year: Frank Kaminsky, Wisconsin

=== Major freshman of the year awards ===
- Wayman Tisdale Award (USBWA): Jahlil Okafor, Duke

=== Major coach of the year awards ===
- Associated Press Coach of the Year: John Calipari, Kentucky
- Henry Iba Award (USBWA): Tony Bennett, Virginia
- NABC Coach of the Year: John Calipari, Kentucky
- Naismith College Coach of the Year: John Calipari, Kentucky
- Sporting News Coach of the Year: John Calipari, Kentucky

=== Other major awards ===
- Bob Cousy Award (best point guard): Delon Wright, Utah
- Jerry West Award (best shooting guard): D'Angelo Russell, Ohio State
- Julius Erving Award (best small forward): Stanley Johnson, Arizona
- Karl Malone Award (best power forward): Montrezl Harrell, Louisville
- Kareem Abdul-Jabbar Award (best center): Frank Kaminsky, Wisconsin
- Pete Newell Big Man Award (best big man): Jahlil Okafor, Duke
- NABC Defensive Player of the Year: Willie Cauley-Stein, Kentucky
- Senior CLASS Award (top senior): Alex Barlow, Butler
- Robert V. Geasey Trophy (top player in Philadelphia Big 5): Darrun Hilliard, Villanova
- Haggerty Award (top player in New York City metro area): Sir'Dominic Pointer, St. John's
- Ben Jobe Award (top minority coach): Bobby Collins, Maryland Eastern Shore
- Hugh Durham Award (top mid-major coach): Brian Katz, Sacramento State
- Jim Phelan Award (top head coach): Bob Huggins, West Virginia
- Lefty Driesell Award (top defensive player): Darion Atkins, Virginia
- Lou Henson Award (top mid-major player): Ty Greene, USC Upstate
- Lute Olson Award (top non-freshman or transfer player): Cameron Payne, Murray State
- Skip Prosser Man of the Year Award (coach with moral character): Keno Davis, Central Michigan
- Academic All-American of the Year (top scholar-athlete): Matt Townsend, Yale
- Elite 89 Award (top GPA among upperclass players at Final Four): Colby Wollenman, Michigan State

== Coaching changes ==
A number of teams changed coaches during and after the season.

| Team | Former coach | Interim coach | New coach | Reason |
|---|---|---|---|---|
| Alabama | Anthony Grant | John Brannen | Avery Johnson | After an 18–14 season, Grant, who led the Crimson Tide to just one NCAA tournament appearance in six seasons, was fired. |
| Alcorn State | Luther Riley | | Montez Robinson | With Riley's teams posting a record of 38-91 over four seasons, include winning just six games the past year, the university decided not to renew his contract. The former coach took a brief leave of absence of January to deal with personal matters. Under Riley's watch, the Braves never finished higher than fifth in the SWAC. |
| Arizona State | Herb Sendek | | Bobby Hurley | Sendek was fired on March 24 after nine seasons. He had signed a three-year contract extension before this season, but went 18–16 and 9–9 in Pac-12 play. |
| Arkansas-Little Rock | Steve Shields | | Chris Beard | On March 18, 2015, Shields was let go by the Arkansas–Little Rock administration after 12 seasons. He left as the winningest coach in the Trojans' history with a career record of 192-178. However, despite winning five regular-season Sun Belt titles, Shield's team only won one tournament championship. |
| Bowling Green | Chris Jans | | Michael Huger | Jans was fired on April 2 despite a 21–12 record in his first season in charge. Media reports indicated that the firing was due to alleged inappropriate behavior at a Bowling Green, Ohio bar after the Falcons' final game of the season. |
| Bradley | Geno Ford | | Brian Wardle | Ford was fired after posting a 46–86 record in four seasons at Bradley. |
| Bucknell | Dave Paulsen | | Nathan Davis | Paulsen left to take a George Mason job. |
| Buffalo | Bobby Hurley | | Nate Oats | Hurley left to take an Arizona State job. Assistant coach Nate Oats was promoted to head coach on April 11. |
| Butler | Brandon Miller | Chris Holtmann | | On October 1, 2014, Miller abruptly went on a leave of absence to deal with an unspecified medical issue. After one year as an assistant coach, Holtmann was named interim head coach on October 2, 2014. As interim coach, he guided Butler to a 10–4 start including a third-place finish in the Battle 4 Atlantis tournament. On January 2, 2015, the interim tag was removed and Holtmann became the 23rd head coach of the Butler University men's basketball team. |
| Charlotte | Alan Major | Ryan Odom | Mark Price | After Major took a medical on January 6 to deal with chronic health issues, Odom was relieved of his coaching duties on March 16 when Major and the university mutually agreed to part ways, and his staff was not retained. |
| Chattanooga | Will Wade | | Matt McCall | Wade, who was the first assistant Shaka Smart hired upon taking over the VCU program in 2009, returned to VCU after Smart's departure for Texas. |
| The Citadel | Chuck Driesell | | Duggar Baucom | Driesell's contract was not renewed following the season. |
| DePaul | Oliver Purnell | | Dave Leitao | Purnell resigned after posting an overall record of 54–105 (15-75 in Big East play) in five seasons. The Blue Demons brought back Dave Leitao, who had been head coach from 2002 to 2005, a stint that included the team's last NCAA tournament appearance (2004). |
| Eastern Kentucky | Jeff Neubauer | | Dan McHale | |
| East Tennessee State | Murry Bartow | | Steve Forbes | After 12 years, an overall record of 224-169 (with a record of 16-14, 8-10 in SoCon play in the 2014–15 season), and three NCAA appearances at East Tennessee State, Bartow was fired due a five-season tournament drought with declining team performance, increasing fan apathy after the 2014–15 season, and the decision to head a new way with the program. |
| Florida | Billy Donovan | | Michael White | Donovan left on April 30 to fill the head coaching vacancy at the Oklahoma City Thunder. In Donovan's 19 seasons at Florida, the Gators had an overall record of 467–186, 14 NCAA tournament appearances, and national championships in 2006 and 2007. |
| Fordham | Tom Pecora | | Jeff Neubauer | Fordham hired Eastern Kentucky coach Jeff Neubauer to fill their vacant spot. |
| George Mason | Paul Hewitt | | Dave Paulsen | Hewitt, formerly head coach of Georgia Tech from 2000–2011, was fired after posting a 66–67 record in four seasons with George Mason. |
| Green Bay | Brian Wardle | | Linc Darner | Wardle left Green Bay after five seasons to accept the head coaching job with Bradley on March 27. |
| Hawaii | Benjy Taylor | | Eran Ganot | |
| Holy Cross | Milan Brown | | Bill Carmody | Brown was relieved of his duties following the Crusaders' season ending loss to Bucknell in the Patriot League tournament on March 5. Brown had a 56–67 record over five seasons, with just one postseason appearance. |
| Iowa State | Fred Hoiberg | | Steve Prohm | Hoiberg, long rumored as an NBA coaching prospect, left for the head coaching vacancy with the Chicago Bulls. |
| Kennesaw State | Jimmy Lallathin | | Al Skinner | Lallathin was fired on March 23 after only one season as the full-time head coach. He had received the job on an interim basis in January 2014 when previous head coach Lewis Preston took a leave of absence, and was given the full-time job after Preston was dismissed at the end of that season, but went 10–22 in his first full season in charge. |
| Liberty | Dale Layer | | Ritchie McKay | Layer had led the Flames to the Big South Conference championship in 2013, but had only one winning season in five years. He was fired following Liberty's loss to UNC Asheville in the Big South tournament. |
| Louisiana Tech | Michael White | | Eric Konkol | White left for the Florida job. He was replaced by Miami assistant Konkol. |
| Mississippi State | Rick Ray | | Ben Howland | Ray was fired on March 21, 2015 after going 37–60 in three seasons, ending with a 13–19 overall record and 6–12 in SEC play this season. The Bulldogs hired TV analyst Howland, a veteran coach best known for leading UCLA to three straight Final Fours from 2006 to 2008. |
| Murray State | Steve Prohm | | Matt McMahon | Prohm left for the Iowa State job. |
| Nevada | David Carter | | Eric Musselman | Carter was fired on March 11, 2015 after going 9–22 overall and 5–13 in Mountain West play this season, and failing to make the NCAA tournament in his six seasons at head coach. |
| Northern Kentucky | Dave Bezold | | John Brannen | Bezold was fired on March 17 after 11 seasons. Although he went 194–133 overall, he was 33–54 in the first three years of NKU's four-year transition from Division II to Division I. |
| Penn | Jerome Allen | | Steve Donahue | On March 8, Allen announced his resignation to follow the Quakers' last game on March 10. |
| St. John's | Steve Lavin | | Chris Mullin | Lavin and St. John's mutually agreed to part ways on March 28. The Red Storm hired arguably their greatest player ever, Hall of Famer Mullin, who since retiring as a player has been in the front offices of the Golden State Warriors and Sacramento Kings. |
| San Diego | Bill Grier | | Lamont Smith | Grier was fired on March 16 after eight seasons. He was unable to duplicate the success of his first season in 2007–08, when he led the Toreros to the first NCAA tournament win by either of San Diego's Division I programs. The Toreros only made one postseason appearance after that (last season's CIT), and finished 15–16 this season and 8–10 in the West Coast Conference. |
| SIU Edwardsville | Lennox Forrester | | Jon Harris | Forrester, who oversaw the Cougars' transition from Division II to Division I, was fired after eight seasons and an 82–146 overall record. |
| Southeast Missouri State | Dickey Nutt | | Rick Ray | Nutt was fired on March 23 after six seasons. He was coming off back-to-back winning records, but the Redhawks went 13–17 this season, leaving him at 90–108 overall at SEMO. |
| Tennessee | Donnie Tyndall | | Rick Barnes | Tyndall was fired on March 28 after the school was briefed by the NCAA on accusations it was about to level against him stemming from his actions at his previous coaching stop at Southern Miss. The Volunteers hired Rick Barnes fresh off his firing from Texas. |
| Texas | Rick Barnes | | Shaka Smart | Barnes was notified on March 28 that he had been fired. Despite a 402–180 record in 17 seasons at Texas, this season's Longhorns, widely touted as a Big 12 contender and ranked in the preseason top 10, finished 20–14 overall and 8–10 in the Big 12, ending in defeat in their NCAA tournament opener.- |
| UIC | Howard Moore | | Steve McClain | Moore was fired after four seasons in which the Flames went 33–62 overall and 12–40 in the Horizon League. |
| Utah State | Stew Morrill | | Tim Duryea | Morrill, head coach for the Aggies since 1998, announced his retirement effective at the end of the season. |
| Utah Valley | Dick Hunsaker | | Mark Pope | Hunsaker announced he would step down from his position effective June 30, 2015. The Wolverines, based in Orem, Utah, went next door to Provo for their new coach, hiring BYU assistant Pope. |
| VCU | Shaka Smart | | Will Wade | Smart left for the Texas job. |
| VMI | Duggar Baucom | | Dan Earl | Baucom left for the Southern Conference's other military school, The Citadel. |

== See also ==
- 2014–15 NCAA Division I women's basketball season
