= List of Northern Kentucky Norse men's basketball head coaches =

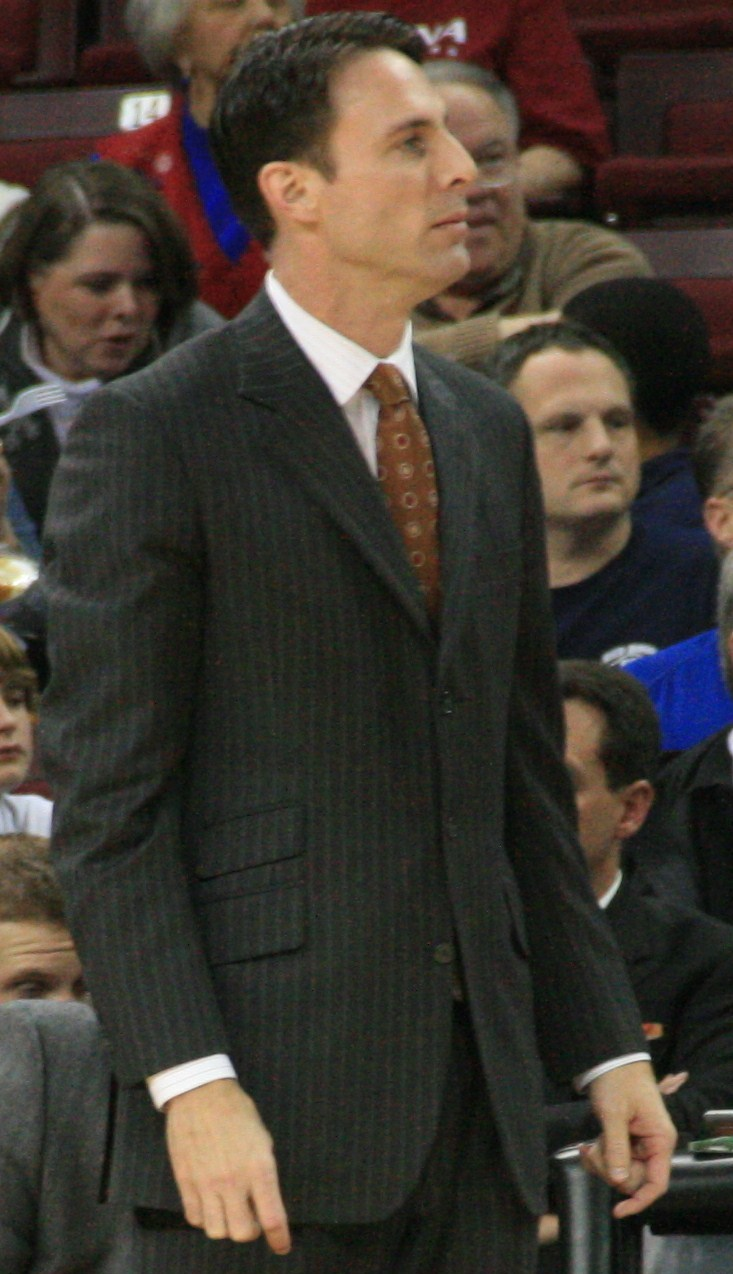
Darrin Horn, the current head coach of the Northern Kentucky Norse.

The following is a list of Northern Kentucky Norse men's basketball head coaches. There have been six head coaches of the Norse in their 52-season history.

Northern Kentucky's current head coach is Darrin Horn. He was hired as the Norse's head coach in April 2019, replacing John Brannen, who left to become the head coach at Cincinnati.

| No. | Tenure | Coach | Years | Record | Pct. |
|---|---|---|---|---|---|
| 1 | 1971–1980 | Mote Hils | 9 | 119–118 | .502 |
| 2 | 1980–1988 | Mike Beitzel | 8 | 125–95 | .568 |
| 3 | 1988–2004 | Ken Shields | 16 | 306–170 | .643 |
| 4 | 2004–2015 | Dave Bezold | 11 | 194–133 | .593 |
| 5 | 2015–2019 | John Brannen | 4 | 81–51 | .614 |
| 6 | 2019–present | Darrin Horn | 4 | 79–45 | .637 |
| Totals | | 6 coaches | 52 seasons | 904–612 | .596 |
Records updated through end of 2022–23 season Source
