= Northern Kentucky Norse men's basketball statistical leaders =

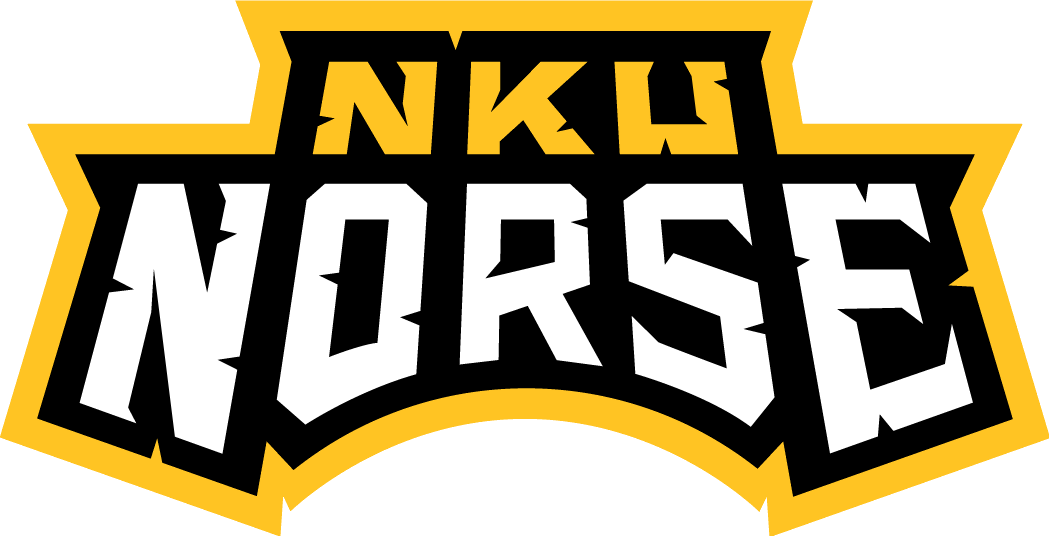

The Northern Kentucky Norse men's basketball statistical leaders are individual statistical leaders of the Northern Kentucky Norse men's basketball program in various categories, including points, assists, blocks, rebounds, and steals. Within those areas, the lists identify single-game, single-season, and career leaders. The Norse represent Northern Kentucky University (NKU) in the NCAA Division I Horizon League.

Northern Kentucky began competing in intercollegiate basketball in 1971. The Norse originally competed in the National Association of Intercollegiate Athletics (NAIA), later moving to NCAA Division II but maintaining their NAIA membership until aligning completely with the NCAA in the mid-1980s. NKU remained a D-II member until moving to Division I from the 2012–13 season. This history is significant because the official recording of statistics began at different times in different organizations, as well as different NCAA divisions.

The NAIA record books do not indicate when the organization began officially recording statistics on a national basis, but its current records (as of 2020–21) for single-game and single-season assists were both set in 1972–73, and the career record for blocks dates to 1975. The NCAA has recorded scoring statistics throughout the "modern era" of basketball, which it defines as starting with the 1937–38 season, the first after the center jump after each made field goal was abolished. Individual rebounding was first recorded in 1950–51, as were individual assists. While rebounding has been recorded in every subsequent season, the NCAA stopped recording individual assists after the 1951–52 season. Recording of assists resumed in D-I in 1983–84, but that statistic was not recorded in D-II until 1988–89. Similarly, while the NCAA started recording blocks and steals in D-I in 1988–89, it did not record those statistics in D-II until 1992–93. NKU's record books include players in all named statistics, regardless of whether they were officially recorded by any of the governing bodies in which the school was a member.

These lists are updated through the end of the 2019–20 season.

== Scoring ==
Career
Rk	Player	Points	Seasons
1	Marques Warrick	2,246	2020–21 2021–22 2022–23 2023–24
2	Drew McDonald	2,066	2015–16 2016–17 2017–18 2018–19
3	Craig Sanders	2,007	1998–99 1999–00 2000–01 2001–02
4	Brady Jackson	1,980	1979–80 1980–81 1981–82 1982–83
5	Richard Derkson	1,927	1971–72 1972–73 1973–74 1974–75
6	Dan Doellman	1,920	1975–76 1976–77 1977–78 1978–79
7	LaRon Moore	1,866	1993–94 1994–95 1995–96 1996–97
8	Derek Fields	1,664	1985–86 1986–87 1987–88 1988–89
9	Trevon Faulkner	1,627	2018–19 2019–20 2020–21 2021–22 2022–23
10	Mike Kelsey	1,595	2001–02 2002–03 2003–04 2004–05

Season
Rk	Player	Points	Season
1	Derek Fields	664	1988–89
2	Marques Warrick	659	2022–23
3	Marques Warrick	657	2023–24
4	Donovan Oday	631	2025–26
5	Brady Jackson	615	1982–83
6	Craig Sanders	598	2000–01
7	Chris Wall	574	1988–89
8	Drew McDonald	573	2016–17
9	LaRon Moore	566	1995–96
	LaRon Moore	556	1996–97

Single game
Rk	Player	Points	Season	Opponent
1	Mike Kelsey	50	2003–04	Indianapolis

== Rebounds ==
Career
Rk	Player	Rebounds	Seasons
1	Drew McDonald	1,081	2015–16 2016–17 2017–18 2018–19
2	LaRon Moore	859	1993–94 1994–95 1995–96 1996–97
3	Steve Jesse	812	1980–81 1981–82 1982–83 1983–84
4	Dan Doellman	784	1975–76 1976–77 1977–78 1978–79
5	Todd Svoboda	770	1989–90 1990–91 1991–92
6	Adrian Nelson	729	2018–19 2019–20 2020–21 2021–22
7	Trey Robinson	705	2020–21 2021–22 2022–23 2023–24 2024–25
8	Tony Faehr	686	1975–76 1976–77 1977–78
9	Richard Derkson	668	1971–72 1972–73 1973–74 1974–75
10	Chris Wall	666	1985–86 1986–87 1987–88 1988–89

Season
Rk	Player	Rebounds	Season
1	Chris Brandon	347	2022–23
2	Drew McDonald	308	2017–18
3	Todd Svoboda	282	1991–92
4	Cliff Clinton	282	1996–97
5	George Smith	278	1989–90
6	Drew McDonald	268	2016–17
7	Terry Hairston	266	1988–89
8	Dan Doellman	265	1978–79
	Marvin Johnson	265	1971–72
10	Tony Faehr	255	1975–76

Single game
Rk	Player	Rebounds	Season	Opponent
1	Marvin Johnson	24	1971–72	Campbellsville

== Assists ==
Career
Rk	Player	Assists	Seasons
1	Craig Conley	530	1997–98 1998–99 1999–00 2000–01
2	Shannon Minor	529	1993–94 1994–95 1995–96 1996–97
3	Kevin Listerman	501	1995–96 1996–97 1997–98 1999–00
4	Billy Finnell	430	2005–06 2006–07 2007–08 2008–09
5	Craig Wilhoit	420	1989–90 1990–91 1991–92 1992–93
6	Derek Fields	406	1985–86 1986–87 1987–88 1988–89
7	Lavone Holland II	396	2015–16 2016–17 2017–18
8	Dennis Bettis	390	1975–76 1976–77 1977–78 1978–79
9	Dan Doellman	378	1975–76 1976–77 1977–78 1978–79
	Sam Vinson	378	2021–22 2022–23 2023–24 2024–25

Season
Rk	Player	Assists	Season
1	Craig Conley	205	2000–01
2	Shannon Minor	176	1996–97
3	Shannon Minor	172	1995–96
4	Craig Wilhoit	162	1991–92
5	Kevin Listerman	157	1997–98
6	Derek Fields	154	1988–89
7	Sean Rowland	152	2003–04
8	Michael Bradley	150	2023–24
9	Ethan Elliott	146	2025–26
10	Lavone Holland II	143	2016–17

Single game
Rk	Player	Assists	Season	Opponent
1	Craig Conley	14	2000–01	UM-St. Louis

== Steals ==
Career
Rk	Player	Steals	Seasons
1	Kevin Listerman	304	1995–96 1996–97 1997–98 1999–00
2	Sam Vinson	230	2021–22 2022–23 2023–24 2024–25
3	Craig Conley	220	1997–98 1998–99 1999–00 2000–01
4	Trey Robinson	202	2020–21 2021–22 2022–23 2023–24 2024–25
5	Derek Fields	201	1985–86 1986–87 1987–88 1988–89
6	Brenden Stowers	195	1999–00 2000–01 2001–02 2002–03
7	Brady Jackson	181	1979–80 1980–81 1981–82 1982–83
	Ryan Schrand	181	1991–92 1992–93 1993–94 1994–95
9	Craig Wilhoit	171	1989–90 1990–91 1991–92 1992–93
10	LaRon Moore	164	1993–94 1994–95 1995–96 1996–97

Season
Rk	Player	Steals	Season
1	Kevin Listerman	90	1996–97
2	Sam Vinson	76	2022–23
3	Kevin Listerman	75	1999–00
4	Kevin Listerman	72	1997–98
5	Craig Conley	71	2000–01
6	Donovan Oday	69	2025–26
7	Kevin Listerman	67	1995–96
	Xavier Rhodes	67	2022–23
9	Sam Vinson	66	2021–22
10	Jimmy Matthews	64	1990–91

Single game
Rk	Player	Steals	Season	Opponent
1	Greg Phelia	10	1990–91	Hawaii-Loa

== Blocks ==
Career
Rk	Player	Blocks	Seasons
1	Patrick Holt	249	1985–86 1986–87 1987–88 1988–89
2	Reggie Talbert	154	1993–94 1994–95 1995–96
3	LaRon Moore	140	1993–94 1994–95 1995–96 1996–97
4	Jalen Billups	132	2011–12 2012–13 2013–14 2014–15 2015–16
5	Cliff Clinton	125	1996–97 1997–98
6	Keeyan Itejere	104	2023–24 2024–25
7	Carl Mitchell	101	2000–01 2001–02
8	Gary Woeste	92	1977–78 1978–79 1979–80
9	DeAndre Nealy	85	2011–12
10	Mike Vieth	83	1995–96 1996–97 1997–98 1998–99

Season
Rk	Player	Blocks	Season
1	DeAndre Nealy	85	2011–12
2	Patrick Holt	73	1985–86
3	Cliff Clinton	72	1996–97
4	Leslie Malone	71	2008–09
5	Reggie Talbert	67	1994–95
6	Patrick Holt	66	1986–87
7	Mike Vieth	63	1998–99
8	Patrick Holt	60	1988–89
9	David Palmer	59	2009–10
10	Carl Mitchell	53	2001–02
	Cliff Clinton	53	1997–98
	Keeyan Itejere	53	2024–25

Single game
Rk	Player	Blocks	Season	Opponent
1	Gary Woeste	8	1979–80	Wright St.
	Patrick Holt	8	1985–86	Kentucky State
	Patrick Holt	8	1985–86	Saint Joseph's
	Patrick Holt	8	1986–87	Northeastern Illinois
	Leslie Malone	8	2008–09	Missouri S&T
	Leslie Malone	8	2008–09	Bellarmine
	DeAndre Nealy	8	2011–12	Urbana
	DeAndre Nealy	8	2011–12	Indianapolis
