= Newport Central Catholic High School =

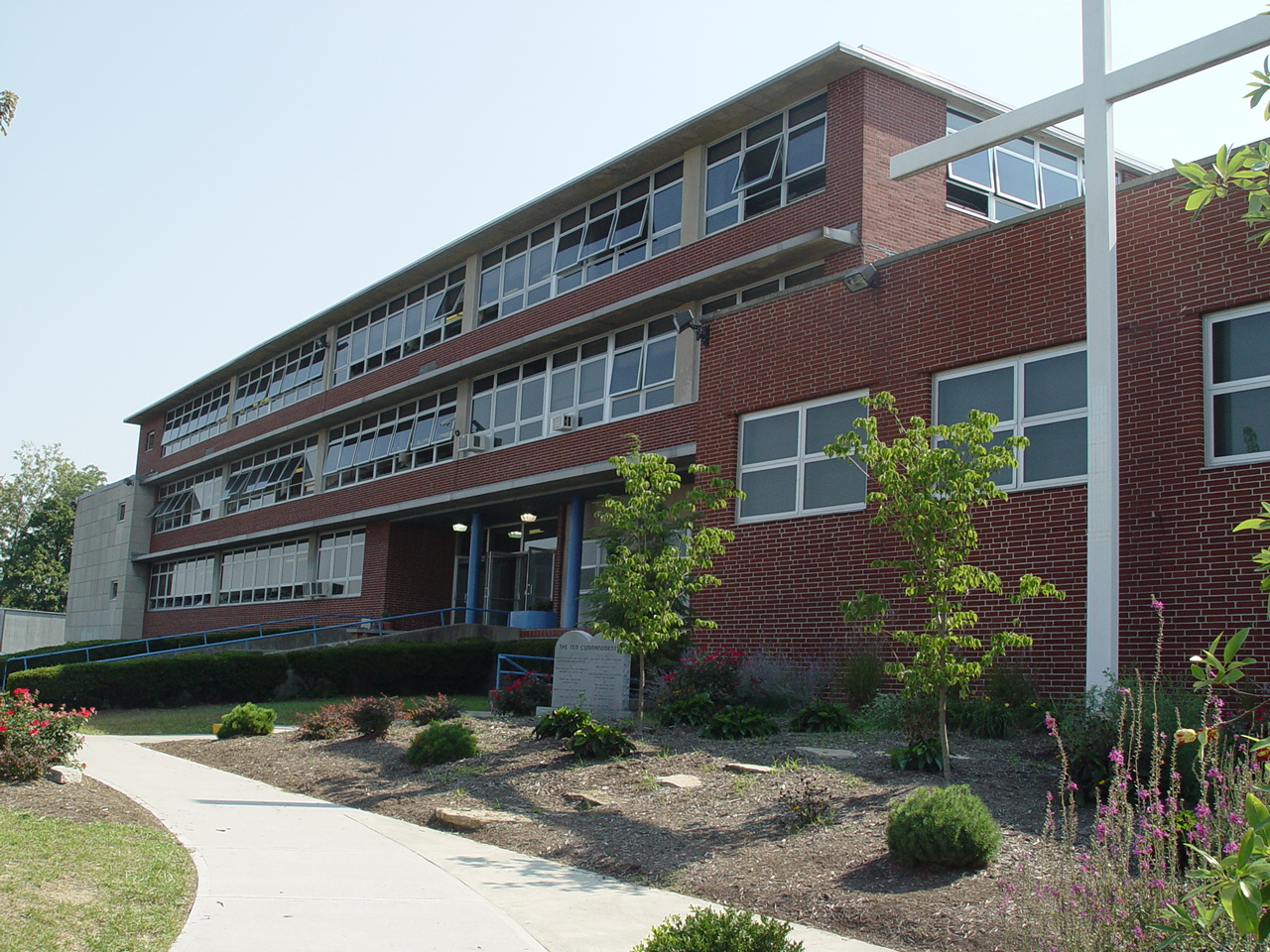

Location
- 13 Carothers Road; Newport, (Campbell County), Kentucky 41071; United States; 39°5′11″N 84°28′59″W

Information
- Type: Private, Coeducational
- Motto: To succeed you must believe, and we believe.
- Religious affiliation: Roman Catholic
- Founded: 1896 (Newport Catholic); 1903 (Our Lady of Providence); 1983 (Newport Central Catholic)
- Oversight: Diocese of Covington
- Principal: Kenny Collopy
- Grades: 9-12
- Enrollment: 209 (2022-2023)
- Student to teacher ratio: 16:1
- Colors: Royal Blue & Gold
- Mascot: Thoroughbreds
- Nickname: Thoroughbreds
- Rival: Bishop Brossart/Highlands
- Accreditation: Southern Association of Colleges and Schools
- Athletic Director: Jeff Schulkens
- Website: https://www.ncchs.com

Newport Central Catholic High School (abbreviated NewCath or NCC) is a coeducational private secondary school in Newport, Kentucky, and part of the Roman Catholic Diocese of Covington. It is located in the center of Newport overlooking the Cincinnati skyline and Ohio Valley. The school is housed in a building opened in 1955 for the all-boys Newport Catholic High School, which was founded in 1929 as the effective successor to another all-boys high school established in 1896.

Present-day Newport Central Catholic was founded in 1983 when Newport Catholic High merged with the all-girls Our Lady of Providence Academy, which had been founded as the Academy of Notre Dame de Providence in 1903. it serves students in grades 9–12 in the Northern Kentucky area, mostly from Campbell County. The mascot is the Thoroughbred, and the school colors are royal blue and gold. NCC is a member of the National Catholic Educational Association (NCEA).

== Demographics ==
In 2009–2010 school year, the total student population was 425. A total of 97% were white and 3% were students of color. A total of 25% of students are on some form of financial aid.

== Athletics ==
The old Newport Catholic High became a member of the Greater Cincinnati League in the 1940s but left after the 1970 season.

== Notable alumni ==
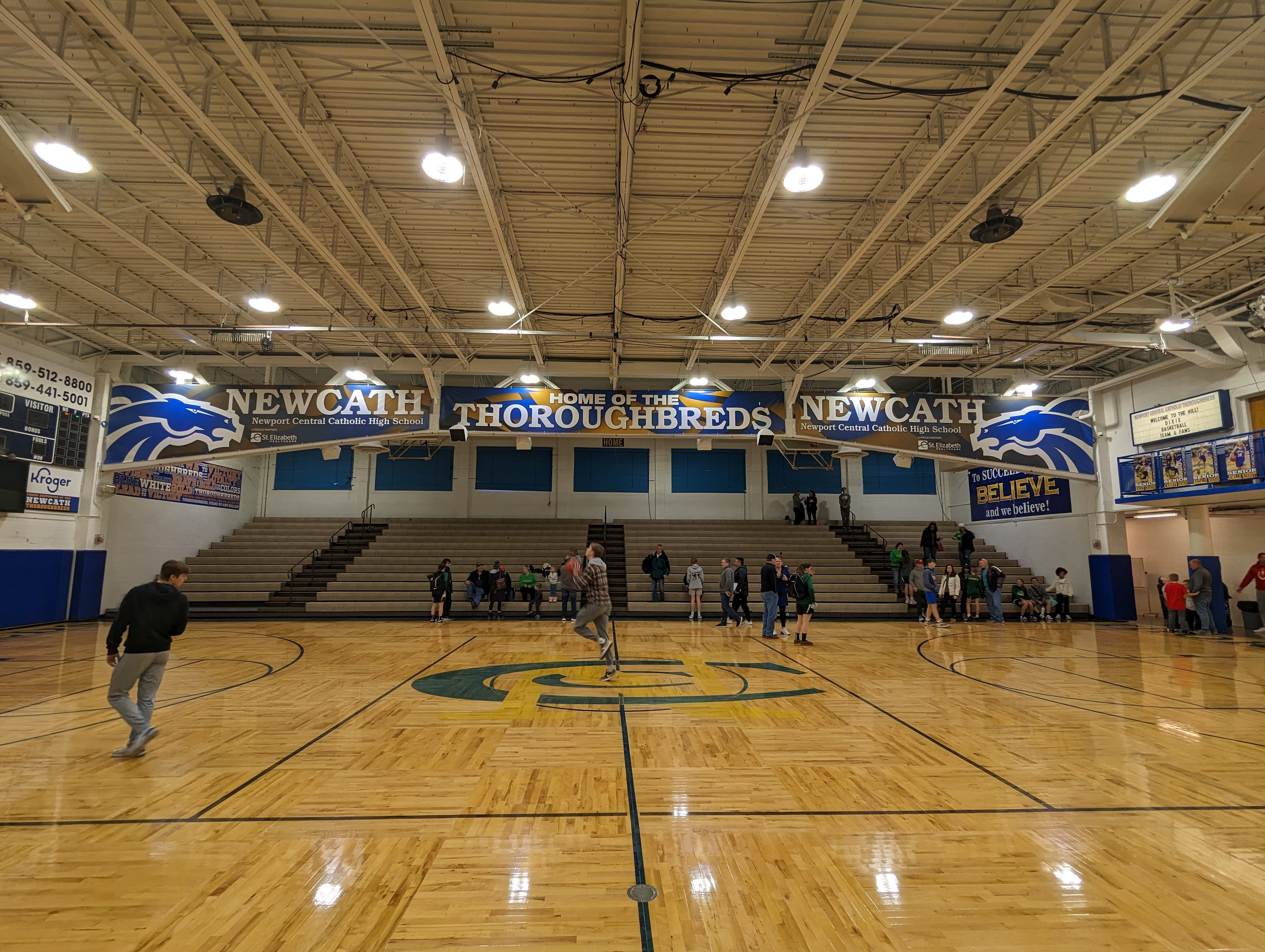
The gym of Newport Central Catholic High School

This list includes alumni of Newport Central Catholic, the original Newport Catholic, and Our Lady of Providence.

- Jeff Brady, former NFL linebacker
- John Brannen, basketball player (Marshall University) and basketball head coach (Northern Kentucky University and University of Cincinnati)
- Dave Cowens (Newport Catholic, 1966), Boston Celtics basketball player and NBA MVP, 1973
- Drew McDonald (Newport Central Catholic, 2015), basketball player named Horizon League Player of the Year in 2019 for Northern Kentucky University
- Jim Minshall, former MLB pitcher
- Larry Staverman (Newport Catholic, 1954), NBA basketball player with the Cincinnati Royals, Chicago Zephyrs/Baltimore Bullets, Detroit Pistons
- Galadriel Stineman (Newport Central Catholic, 2002), actress and voice actor; appeared in The Middle & Ben 10
- Scott Wiggins, professional baseball player
