= Drew McDonald (basketball) =

American basketball player

Personal information
- Born: September 9, 1996 (age 30) Cold Spring, Kentucky, U.S.
- Listed height: 6 ft 8 in (2.03 m)
- Listed weight: 250 lb (113 kg)

Career information
- High school: Newport Central Catholic (Newport, Kentucky)
- College: Northern Kentucky (2015–2019)
- NBA draft: 2019: undrafted
- Position: Power forward / center

Career highlights
- Horizon League Player of the Year (2019); 3× First-team All-Horizon League (2017–2019); Horizon League All-Freshman Team (2016)

Drew McDonald (born September 9, 1996) is an American former basketball player. He played college basketball for the Northern Kentucky Norse. McDonald was named the conference's Player of the Year in 2019.

Born in the Cincinnati area to a high school basketball coach and growing up in the suburb of Cold Spring, Kentucky, McDonald was lightly recruited by NCAA Division I programs and unranked by recruiting services despite being a finalist for Kentucky's Mr. Basketball award at Newport Central Catholic High School. In four seasons at Northern Kentucky University (NKU), he has become the school's all-time leader in points and rebounds, and has also been called "the on-court catalyst ushering in the Division I era of Norse Athletics" by Premier Sports Management, the administrator of the annual Senior CLASS Awards in multiple NCAA sports.

== Early life and high school ==
Unlike most sons of coaches in men's college basketball, McDonald's coaching parent is his mother. Following a college basketball career at NKU, the former Christie Freppon married former NKU tennis player Jeff McDonald, going on to become head girls' basketball coach at Newport Central Catholic (NCC or NewCath) during Drew's childhood. Drew, the only son among the McDonalds' three children, served as a ball boy while his mother was coaching. In a 2018 interview for NKU's student newspaper, McDonald recalled, "It was just kind of a lifestyle. I would just go shoot on the sidelines and go be around the team. I just like being around it. That’s just, the way we lived was basketball. It shaped me into how I am today." He also picked up many of the game's subtleties even before turning 10; in the same story, his mother said, "I think we’ve gone through 20 of them [dry-erase boards]. He would be in the family room with the whiteboard and the marker drawing (plays). He was doing it for hours and everyday." His mother used many of the plays the young McDonald drew up in NewCath games. As McDonald progressed in the sport, his mother remained a vocal presence, with Drew recalling that she was "the LaVar Ball of Newport Central Catholic."

After a major growth spurt in middle school that saw him add 12 inches (30 cm), McDonald went on to attend NCC, where he was a star in both basketball and golf. In basketball, he was initially on the junior varsity team as a freshman, and got to dress for varsity games, but moved full-time to the varsity early in that season after scoring 22 points off the bench in a varsity game. He averaged 11.7 points and 6.5 rebounds as a freshman, and by his senior season had increased those averages to 16.8 and 10.7. During his NCC career, the Thoroughbreds went 129–20 overall, winning state titles in the All "A" Classic, an in-season state tournament for Kentucky's smallest high schools, in each of his last three seasons. In his senior season of 2014–15, he was a finalist for Kentucky Mr. Basketball, also sharing player of the year honors in the Kentucky High School Athletic Association's 9th Region (which covers Northern Kentucky). In golf, he won nearly 50 individual titles on Northern Kentucky's junior circuit and more than 50 other individual titles, including an All "A" state championship as a senior. (Note: The All "A" Classic began as a boys' basketball tournament for Northern Kentucky schools in 1980, but expanded to include other Kentucky schools in 1982. It became a full state tournament in 1990, with a girls' basketball tournament added the next year. State championships are now additionally held under the All "A" banner in baseball for boys; cheerleading, fast-pitch softball, and volleyball for girls; and golf and soccer for both boys and girls.)

=== Recruiting ===
McDonald was not highly ranked by most recruiting outlets, partly because he had equally talented teammates at other positions. While he received two other Division I scholarship offers from UNC Asheville and Wright State, he was a priority recruit for NKU's coach at the time, Dave Bezold. McDonald's NKU heritage also played into his decision—not only were both of his parents athletes at the school, but a cousin played volleyball at both NKU and Xavier, and a late uncle, Bill Aker, had been head baseball coach at NKU for nearly 30 years, and is the namesake of NKU's baseball field. When McDonald verbally committed to the Norse before his senior year at NewCath, he told The Cincinnati Enquirer, "They wanted me and they've wanted me for about two years," adding "I wanted to go somewhere where I was wanted. My dream has always been to play in the NCAA tournament, and what better way to do that then to lead your hometown school to its first March Madness and play in front of all your friends and family." He initially wanted to play both basketball and golf in college, but quickly concluded that the time demands of participating in both sports at the Division I level would be too great, and put his competitive golf career on hold upon his graduation from NewCath.

== College career ==
His freshman season of 2015–16 was NKU's first in the Horizon League. Although mostly playing off the bench, he still averaged nearly 20 minutes per game and finished with averages of 10.5 points and 6.2 rebounds, also amassing five double-doubles. He was twice named the Horizon League's Freshman of the Week, led the Norse in scoring during conference play, and made the league's All-Freshman Team at the end of the season.

The following season was the first in which the Norse were eligible for the NCAA Tournament, following the end of the school's four-year transition from NCAA Division II. In that season, McDonald led the Norse in both scoring (16.4 points) and rebounds (7.7). His 37 points on January 7, 2017, against Cleveland State were the most by an NKU player since the school's 2012 move to Division I. McDonald was named to the All-Horizon League first team at the end of the regular season, and was also named to the conference's five-member All-Academic Team for men's basketball; the only other individual named to both teams was conference Player of the Year Alec Peters of Valparaiso. NKU went on to win the Horizon League tournament, becoming only the seventh Division I men's team overall and the second since 1970 to reach the NCAA tournament in its first season of eligibility; McDonald was named to the all-tournament team. NKU's season ended in the first round of the NCAA tournament with a 79–70 loss to Kentucky.

Prior to McDonald's junior season of 2017–18, he was named the Horizon League's preseason player of the year. He again led the Norse in scoring and rebounding (17.0 and 9.6), and also led the conference in double-doubles with 18 as the Norse won the Horizon League regular-season title outright. McDonald was again named to the All-Horizon League first team and All-Academic Team, this time as the only individual to make both teams. The Norse were shocked in the quarterfinals of the Horizon League tournament by Cleveland State, landing them in the National Invitation Tournament as a conference regular-season champion that did not make the NCAA tournament. They would lose 66–58 in the first round at Louisville despite a halftime lead and a double-double from McDonald. After the season, McDonald was named as a Lou Henson All-American as one of the top 30 mid-major players in Division I men's basketball. During the 2018 offseason, McDonald represented the US in the inaugural FISU America games for university athletes in the Americas, held in Brazil, with the USA winning the gold medal.

His senior season of 2018–19 saw him named again as the Horizon League's preseason player of the year. McDonald was also named as one of 20 preseason candidates for the Karl Malone Award, presented by the Naismith Memorial Basketball Hall of Fame to the top Division I men's power forward. Early in the season, he was named one of 30 candidates for the men's basketball version of the Senior CLASS Award, and was later named as one of the 10 finalists for that award. During the season, he became the all-time rebounding leader for the Norse in a loss to Eastern Kentucky on December 8, 2018, and surpassed the 1,000-rebound mark in a win over Detroit Mercy on February 7, 2019. At the time, he was one of only nine active Division I men's players with 1,000 or more rebounds, and only the sixth player in Horizon League history to reach the milestone. On March 2, in his final regular-season college game, a win over Green Bay that secured a share of the Horizon League regular-season title, he surpassed the 2,000-point mark and became the school's all-time scoring leader. As of the end of the regular season, McDonald again led the team in scoring (19.3) and rebounds (9.6). McDonald was also named to the Horizon League All-Academic team for the third time. On the opening day of the Horizon League tournament, he was named the conference's Player of the Year.

== Post-college ==
Following the close of his college career, McDonald did not pursue a professional basketball career. Instead, he accepted a role with the Northern Kentucky Chamber of Commerce as a membership representative.

== Career statistics ==
Legend
| GP | Games played | GS | Games started | MPG | Minutes per game |
| FG% | Field goal percentage | 3P% | 3-point field goal percentage | FT% | Free throw percentage |
| RPG | Rebounds per game | APG | Assists per game | SPG | Steals per game |
| BPG | Blocks per game | PPG | Points per game | **Bold** | Career high |

=== College ===
| Year | Team | GP | GS | MPG | FG% | 3P% | FT% | RPG | APG | SPG | BPG | PPG |
|---|---|---|---|---|---|---|---|---|---|---|---|---|
| 2015–16 | Northern Kentucky | 30 | 2 | 19.4 | **.482** | .280 | .730 | 6.2 | 1.1 | .3 | .4 | 10.5 |
| 2016–17 | Northern Kentucky | **35** | **35** | 30.1 | .473 | .384 | .738 | 7.7 | 1.7 | .4 | **.5** | 16.4 |
| 2017–18 | Northern Kentucky | 32 | 32 | **30.6** | .464 | .337 | **.802** | **9.6** | 2.3 | **.5** | **.5** | 17.0 |
| 2018–19 | Northern Kentucky | 34 | 33 | **30.6** | .472 | **.394** | .798 | 9.4 | **2.8** | **.5** | .4 | **18.7** |
| Career | | 131 | 102 | 27.9 | .472 | .367 | .768 | 8.3 | 2.0 | .4 | .4 | 15.8 |

== Personal life ==
McDonald's athletic pedigree goes well beyond his NKU family connections. Christie's father and brother, Tom Freppon Sr. and Jr., respectively played basketball at Xavier and Thomas More. In addition to the aforementioned cousin, two of his aunts played college volleyball, one at Western Kentucky and the other at Midway.

McDonald extensively volunteers with local children's organizations, among them his former elementary school, the Ronald McDonald House, and Cincinnati Children's Hospital. His Senior CLASS Award nomination additionally mentioned an episode during the aforementioned FISU America games. After one of Team USA's games, two Brazilian reporters sought an interview with him. When McDonald showed up for the interview, he noticed that the stool normally found in the room was absent. He excused himself and quickly returned with the stool, setting it up for the interview. According to Premier Sports Management, "While this was a simple act of kindness, it is indicative of McDonald’s humility and helpfulness that is always on display."

== See also ==
- List of NCAA Division I men's basketball players with 2,000 points and 1,000 rebounds
