= Jeff Brady =

American football player (born 1968)

No. 94, 51, 95, 57, 50, 52
- Position: Linebacker

Personal information
- Born: November 9, 1968 (age 57); Cincinnati, Ohio, U.S.
- Listed height: 6 ft 1 in (1.85 m)
- Listed weight: 243 lb (110 kg)

Career information
- High school: Newport Central Catholic (KY)
- College: Kentucky
- NFL draft: 1991: 12th round, 323rd overall pick

Career history
- Pittsburgh Steelers (1991); Green Bay Packers (1992); Los Angeles Rams (1993); San Diego Chargers (1993); Tampa Bay Buccaneers (1994); Minnesota Vikings (1995–1997); Carolina Panthers (1998); Indianapolis Colts (1999)

Career NFL statistics
- Tackles: 376
- Sacks: 8.5
- Fumble recoveries: 10
- Interceptions: 9
- Stats at Pro Football Reference

Jeffrey Thomas Brady (born November 9, 1968) is an American former professional football player who was a linebacker for nine seasons in the National Football League (NFL) for eight different teams. He was selected by the Pittsburgh Steelers in the 12th round of the 1991 NFL draft with the 323rd overall pick. He played college football for the Kentucky Wildcats.
