= Daryl Gross =

American athletics administrator (born 1961)

Daryl James Gross
Current position
- Team: California State University, Los Angeles

Biographical details
- Born: June 20, 1961; 65 years ago

Daryl James Gross (born June 20, 1961) is currently the executive director of intercollegiate athletics at California State University, Los Angeles. Prior to serving in this position, Gross served as the athletic director at Syracuse University for 11 years.

== Education ==
Gross received his bachelor's degree in psychology and played college football at University of California, Davis. He received his master's and PhD degrees in educational psychology from USC.

== Career ==
Gross began his career at the University of Southern California in intercollegiate athletics after being a graduate coaching assistant (while earning his doctorate).

While serving as senior associate athletic director, Gross was credited for bringing in head coach Pete Carroll for the Trojans football team. Gross was a New York Jets scout when Pete Carroll was the Jets head coach, a relationship that led to him pushing for Carroll to be hired by USC. In 2008, ESPN.com named Carroll's hiring #1 in a list of the Pac-10's Top 10 Moments Of BCS Era.

In 2005, Gross became AD at Syracuse. In June 2015, the university announced that Mark Coyle, of Boise State, was hired to succeed Gross as athletic director. Gross stayed on at Syracuse as the vice president and special assistant to the chancellor at Syracuse University and adjunct professor in sports administration for two more years.

== See also ==
- Syracuse Orange
