= Ty Greene =

American basketball player (born 1992)

Personal information
- Born: June 6, 1992 (age 34) Knoxville, Tennessee
- Listed height: 6 ft 3 in (1.91 m)
- Listed weight: 185 lb (84 kg)

Career information
- High school: Bearden (Knoxville, Tennessee)
- College: USC Upstate (2011–2015)
- NBA draft: 2015: undrafted
- Playing career: 2015–2016

Career history
- 2015–2016: Delaware 87ers

Career highlights
- Lou Henson Award (2015); Honorable mention All-American – AP (2015); Atlantic Sun Player of the Year (2015); First-team All-Atlantic Sun (2015); Atlantic Sun Freshman of the Year (2012)

Ty Greene (born June 6, 1992) is an American former professional basketball player. He played college basketball for the University of South Carolina Upstate, where in 2015 he was named the Atlantic Sun Conference Player of the Year.

== High school career ==
Greene attended Bearden High School where he was named the East Tennessee Player of the Year after leading Bearden to a 35–3 overall record and a spot in the Tennessee Class AAA State Championship Game. He earned All-State Honors as a Junior. As a senior, he averaged 16 points per game and picked up All-District and All-State Tournament honors.

== College career ==
Greene played college basketball for the University of South Carolina Upstate where he was selected as the 2015 Atlantic Sun Conference Player of the Year after finishing the regular season ranked first in the conference in scoring with 23.4 points per game in league games and scoring more than 20 points at least once against every A-Sun opponent. Greene also received national honors that season, as he was named an honorable mention All-American by the Associated Press and received the Lou Henson Award as the top mid-major college player in the country. Greene won Atlantic Sun Freshman of the Year in 2011–2012.

== Professional career ==
On October 31, 2015, Greene was selected by the Delaware 87ers in the third round of the 2015 NBA Development League Draft. Greene played the season for the 87ers, averaging 10.6 points and 2.2 rebounds in 25.6 minutes per game. He played both the point guard and shooting guard positions and saw his role increase as the year wore on.

Following his lone professional season, Greene retired from basketball in favor of a position with the Fellowship of Christian Athletes in Memphis.

== Personal life ==
He is the son of David, who played basketball and baseball at UVA Wise, and Debbie Greene and has a younger brother, Sam. Greene majored in political science. He was married on June 17, 2016, to Knoxville native and fellow Division 1 basketball player Taylor Mills. Mills started her basketball career at Kennesaw State playing in the same conference as Greene. They both won Atlantic Sun Freshman of the Year in 2011–2012. Mills transferred to Belmont winning OVC Newcomer of the Year in 2013–2014.
