= Quincy Taylor (basketball) =

American basketball player (born 1991)

Personal information
- Born: March 31, 1991 (age 35) Grand Rapids, Michigan, U.S.
- Listed height: 6 ft 0 in (1.83 m)
- Listed weight: 180 lb (82 kg)

Career information
- High school: Wichita Collegiate School (Wichita, Kansas)
- College: UAB (2010–2013); Longwood (2014–2015)
- NBA draft: 2015: undrafted
- Playing career: 2016–2023
- Position: Guard
- Number: 5

Career history
- 2016: Cheshire Phoenix
- 2016–2017: Surrey Scorchers
- 2018–2019: Surrey Scorchers
- 2019–2020: BC Kuršiai
- 2021: BC Tallinna Kalev
- 2022: Halcones de Ciudad Obregón
- 2022–2023: Surrey Scorchers

Quincy Taylor (born March 31, 1991) is an American former basketball player. In 2025 he received a lifetime ban from FIBA for participating in match fixing during the 2022-23 British Basketball League season.

== College career ==
Taylor spent three years playing at the University of Alabama at Birmingham. After taking a year out per NCAA transfer rule, he joined Longwood University for his senior year and was named captain. During his collegiate career, Taylor averaged 7.5 points, 2.4 assists, 2.1 rebounds and 1.0 steals per game.

== Professional career ==
After going undrafted in the 2015 NBA draft, Taylor turned professional with British Basketball League team the Cheshire Phoenix in January 2016. He averaged 14.7 points per game while making 15 appearances in his debut season.

Taylor joined league rivals the Surrey Scorchers ahead of the 2016–17 season, where he averaged an improved 15.82 points over 33 games. His performances saw him named the fan's MVP.

In August 2018, Taylor re-signed for the Surrey Scorchers ahead of the 2018–19 British Basketball League season.

At the start of the 2022–23 season, Taylor rejoined the Surrey Scorchers, under a new head coach, Lloyd Gardener. Halfway through the season he left the club for personal reasons.
