= Dave Bezold =

American basketball player and coach

Biographical details
- Born: 1965 (age 60–61); Taylor Mill, Kentucky, U.S.

Playing career
- 1984–1988: Viterbo

Coaching career (HC unless noted)
- 1990–2004: Northern Kentucky (asst.)
- 2004–2015: Northern Kentucky

David Jude Bezold (born 1965) is an American college basketball coach and a former head coach of the men's basketball team at Northern Kentucky University. He oversaw the team's reclassification to Division 1. He graduated from Holy Cross High School in Covington, Kentucky in 1984.

== Head coaching record ==
Record table
Season	Team	Overall	Conference	Standing	Postseason
Northern Kentucky Norse (Great Lakes Valley Conference) (2004–2012)
2004–05	Northern Kentucky	14–15	8–12	7th	
2005–06	Northern Kentucky	17–11	12–7	2nd (East)	
2006–07	Northern Kentucky	24–9	13–6	1st (East)	
2007–08	Northern Kentucky	21–8	14–5	T-1st (East)	NCAA Div II Tournament Regional Final
2008–09	Northern Kentucky	24–7	14–4	1st (East)	NCAA Div II Tournament First Round
2009–10	Northern Kentucky	17–13	8–10	4th (East)	
2010–11	Northern Kentucky	21–9	12–6	T–3rd (East)	NCAA Div II Tournament Second Round
2011–12	Northern Kentucky	23–7	13–5	2nd (East)	NCAA Div II Tournament First Round
Northern Kentucky:		161–79	94–55		
Northern Kentucky Norse (Atlantic Sun Conference) (2012–2015)
2012–13	Northern Kentucky	11–16	9–9	T–4th	
2013–14	Northern Kentucky	9–21	5–13	8th	
2014–15	Northern Kentucky	13–17	7–7	T–4th	
Northern Kentucky:		33–54	21–29		
Total:		194–133			
National champion Postseason invitational champion Conference regular season champion Conference regular season and conference tournament champion Division regular season champion Division regular season and conference tournament champion Conference tournament champion
