= Northern Kentucky Norse men's basketball =

Men's basketball team that represents Northern Kentucky University

2025–26 Northern Kentucky Norse men's basketball team
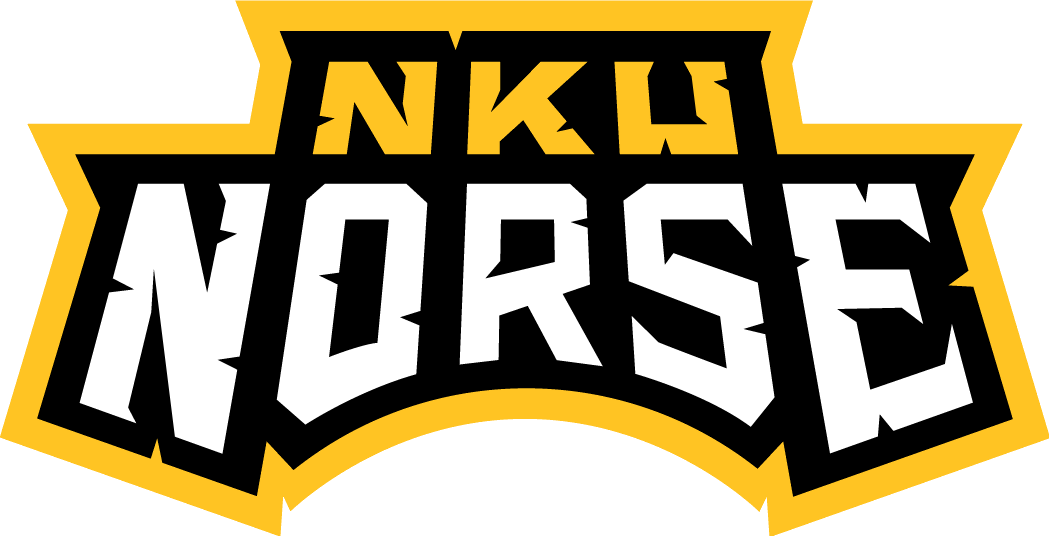
- University: Northern Kentucky University
- Head coach: Darrin Horn (7th season)
- Location: Highland Heights, Kentucky
- Arena: Truist Arena (capacity: 9,200)
- Conference: Horizon League
- Nickname: Norse
- Colors: Black, gold, and white

NCAA Division I tournament appearances
- 2017, 2019, 2023

NCAA Division II tournament runner-up
- 1996, 1997
Other NCAA Division II tournament results
Final Four	1996, 1997
Elite Eight	1996, 1997
Sweet Sixteen	1995, 1996, 1997, 2001, 2007
Appearances	1978, 1995, 1996, 1997, 1998, 2000, 2001, 2003, 2007, 2008, 2009, 2011, 2012

Conference tournament champions
- GLVC: 2003, 2009; Horizon: 2017, 2019, 2020, 2023

Conference regular-season champions
- GLVC: 1995, 1997, 2007, 2008, 2009; Horizon: 2018, 2019

Uniforms
Home	Away	Alternate

The Northern Kentucky Norse men's basketball team represents Northern Kentucky University in Highland Heights, Kentucky, United States. The school's athletic program began a transition to NCAA Division I in the 2012–13 school year. For the first three seasons of the transition (through 2014–15), it was a member of the Atlantic Sun Conference. In the final season of the transition in 2015–16, the Norse joined the Horizon League. The Norse were coached by John Brannen until April 14, 2019, when he left to take a job with the University of Cincinnati Bearcats. Before him the Norse program's coach was Dave Bezold, who had an overall record of 138 wins and 72 losses. On April 23, 2019 Darrin Horn was hired as head coach by Northern Kentucky. Since joining Division I in 2012–13, the Norse have made three NCAA tournament appearances, most recently in 2023.

== History ==
The program began in 1971, then known as Northern Kentucky State College, played out of Newport High School's gymnasium. The team played its first game on November 12, 1971, against Calvary Bible College; winning 109–65.

Over the past 15 years, NKU became one of the country's premier NCAA Division II college basketball programs. The Norse won three Great Lakes Valley Conference (GLVC) tournament championships in 1994–95, 2002–03, and 2008–09; and GLVC East Division regular season champion in 2006–07, 2007–08, and 2008–09. In NCAA postseason play, NKU made 12 NCAA DII postseason appearances, including back-to-back appearances in the NCAA Men's Division II Basketball Championship in the 1995–96 and 1996–97 seasons.

On December 8, 2011, NKU officially announced it accepted an invitation to join the Atlantic Sun Conference (now known as the ASUN Conference) and begin a multi-year transition to Division I beginning in 2012. The Norse began a full ASUN and Division I schedule in the 2012–13 season, however the university was not eligible for NCAA D-I postseason competition until becoming a full Division I member in 2016.

The team's 2013–14 season schedule featured 3 marquee games against Purdue, Kentucky, and North Carolina. This was also the first season in which the team hosted Division I non-conference home games.

In their first season of eligibility, the Norse qualified for the 2017 NCAA tournament. Northern Kentucky is just the seventh school to make the NCAA tournament in their first year of eligibility.

== Postseason ==
=== NCAA Division I tournament results ===
The Norse have three appearances in the NCAA Division I Tournament, with a record of 0–3.

Year	Seed	Round	Opponent	Result
2017	15 S	First round	(2) #6 Kentucky	L 70–79
2019	14 W	First round	(3) #9 Texas Tech	L 57–72
2023	16 MW	First round	(1) #2 Houston	L 52–63

=== NIT results ===
The Norse have appeared in the National Invitation Tournament once; their record is 0–1.

Year	Round	Opponent	Result
2018	First round	Louisville	L 58–66

=== NCAA Division II tournament results ===
The Norse made thirteen appearances in the NCAA Division II Tournament, with a combined record of 17–14.

Year	Round	Opponent	Result
1978	Regional semifinals Regional 3rd-place game	Southern Indiana; Saint Joseph's (IN)	L 78–86; L 87–93
1995	Regional semifinals Regional Finals	Quincy; Southern Indiana	W 97–91; L 94–102
1996	Regional semifinals Regional Finals; Elite Eight; Final Four; National Championship	Northern State; Southern Indiana; Cal State Bakersfield; Virginia Union; Fort Hays State	W 82–71; W 99–87; W 56–55; W 68–66; L 63–70
1997	Regional semifinals Regional Finals; Elite Eight; Final Four; National Championship	Quincy; Oakland; Texas A&M–Commerce; Lynn; Cal State Bakersfield	W 82–54; W 101–87; W 79–67; W 79–58; L 56–57
1998	Regional Quarterfinals; Regional semifinals	Ferris State; Southern Indiana	W 78–63; L 66–81
2000	Regional Quarterfinals; Regional semifinals	Northern Michigan; Kentucky Wesleyan	W 89–57; L 62–66
2001	Regional Quarterfinals; Regional semifinals Regional Finals	Grand Valley State; Southern Indiana; Kentucky Wesleyan	W 106–102; W 93–92; L 57–59
2003	Regional Quarterfinals	Findlay	L 76–80
2007	Regional Quarterfinals; Regional semifinals Regional Finals	Drury; Findlay; Grand Valley State	W 73–68; W 60–56; L 42–66
2008	Regional Quarterfinals; Regional semifinals	Kentucky Wesleyan; Grand Valley State	W 61–55; L 58–62
2009	Regional Quarterfinals	Lake Superior State	L 72–75^{2OT}
2011	Regional Quarterfinals; Regional semifinals	Kentucky Wesleyan; Bellarmine	W 76–74^{OT} L 82–87
2012	Regional Quarterfinals	Findlay	L 49–50

== Awards and honors ==
=== All-American ===
Includes all NKU players designated as Consensus 1st, 2nd, 3rd, and Honorable Mention All-American

- Drew McDonald – 2019

== Record year-by-year ==
Record table
Season	Coach	Overall	Conference	Standing	Postseason
Northern Kentucky (Independent) (1971–1985)
1971–72	Mote Hils	12–15			
1972–73	Mote Hils	10–16			
1973–74	Mote Hils	12–13			
1974–75	Mote Hils	12–14			
1975–76	Mote Hils	17–9			
1976–77	Mote Hils	15–10			
1977–78	Mote Hils	20–8			NCAA DII first round
1978–79	Mote Hils	13–14			
1979–80	Mote Hils	8–19			
1980–81	Mike Beitzel	10–15			
1981–82	Mike Beitzel	15–12			
1982–83	Mike Beitzel	22–7			
1983–84	Mike Beitzel	17–11			
1984–85	Mike Beitzel	16–11			
Northern Kentucky (Great Lakes Valley Conference) (1985–2012)
1985–86	Mike Beitzel	15–13	7–9	T–5th	
1986–87	Mike Beitzel	15–13	7–9	5th	
1987–88	Mike Beitzel	15–13	6–10	T–6th	
1988–89	Ken Shields (Note: Ken Shields of Northern Kentucky University is not the same person as the Canadian basketball coach of the same name.)	17–11	8–8	T–4th	
1989–90	Ken Shields	7–21	4–14	9th	
1990–91	Ken Shields	14–15	6–12	T–8th	
1991–92	Ken Shields	13–15	8–10	7th	
1992–93	Ken Shields	11–16	4–14	T–8th	
1993–94	Ken Shields	12–14	9–9	6th	
1994–95	Ken Shields	25–4	16–2	T–1st	NCAA DII Sweet Sixteen
1995–96	Ken Shields	25–7	15–5	2nd	NCAA DII Runner-up
1996–97	Ken Shields	30–5	16–4	T–1st	NCAA DII Runner-up
1997–98	Ken Shields	23–7	15–3	2nd	NCAA DII second round
1998–99	Ken Shields	16–12	12–10	T–5th	
1999–2000	Ken Shields	26–7	16–4	3rd	NCAA DII second round
2000–01	Ken Shields	27–7	15–5	3rd	NCAA DII Sweet Sixteen
2001–02	Ken Shields	19–8	15–5	T–2nd	
2002–03	Ken Shields	25–6	16–4	T–2nd	
2003–04	Ken Shields	16–15	9–11	7th	
2004–05	Dave Bezold	14–15	8–12	7th	
2005–06	Dave Bezold	17–11	12–7	2nd (East)	
2006–07	Dave Bezold	24–9	13–6	1st (East)	
2007–08	Dave Bezold	21–8	14–5	T–1st (East)	
2008–09	Dave Bezold	24–7	14–4	1st (East)	NCAA DII first round
2009–10	Dave Bezold	17–13	8–10	4th (East)	
2010–11	Dave Bezold	21–9	12–6	T–3rd (East)	NCAA DII second round
2011–12	Dave Bezold	23–7	13–5	2nd (East)	NCAA DII first round
Northern Kentucky (Atlantic Sun Conference – NCAA Division I) (2012–2015)
2012–13	Dave Bezold	11–16	9–9	T–4th	
2013–14	Dave Bezold	9–21	5–13	T–8th	
2014–15	Dave Bezold	13–17	7–7	T–4th	
Northern Kentucky (Horizon League) (2015–present)
2015–16	John Brannen	9–21	5–13	8th	
2016–17	John Brannen	24–10	12–6	T–3rd	NCAA first round
2017–18	John Brannen	22–10	15–3	1st	NIT first round
2018–19	John Brannen	26–9	13–3	T–1st	NCAA first round
2019–20	Darrin Horn	23–9	13–5	2nd	(No postseason held due to COVID-19 pandemic)
2020–21	Darrin Horn	8–11	7–5	8th	
2021–22	Darrin Horn	21–8	14–6	T–4th	
2022–23	Darrin Horn	22–13	14–6	T–2nd	NCAA first round
2023–24	Darrin Horn	18–15	12–8	T–5th	
2024–25	Darrin Horn	17–16	11–9	T–6th	
Total:		899–624	???–???		
National champion Postseason invitational champion Conference regular season champion Conference regular season and conference tournament champion Division regular season champion Division regular season and conference tournament champion Conference tournament champion

== Facility ==
Truist Arena opened in 2008 as The Bank of Kentucky Center and serves as the home arena for the NKU Norse men's and women's basketball teams. The 9,200-seat, multi-purpose arena replaced the 1,800-seat Regents Hall, which had served as the home venue since opening in 1973. Regents Hall still serves as the home of women's volleyball and the practice facility for men's and women's basketball.

The arena name has since changed twice—first in 2015 after The Bank of Kentucky was purchased by BB&T, and then in 2022 after BB&T and SunTrust merged to form Truist Financial.
