= 2015 Pac-12 Conference men's basketball tournament =

- Classification: Division I
- Season: 2014–15
- Teams: 12
- Site: MGM Grand Garden Arena; Paradise, Nevada
- Champions: Arizona (5th title)
- Winning coach: Sean Miller (1st title)
- MVP: Brandon Ashley (Arizona)
- Attendance: 70,563 (total); 12,916 (championship game)
- Television: Pac-12 Network, ESPN

2014–15 Pac-12 Conference men's basketball standings
	Conf.				Overall
Team	W		L	PCT	W		L	PCT
No. 5 Arizona †	16	–	2	.889	34	–	4	.895
No. 25 Oregon	13	–	5	.722	26	–	10	.722
No. 19 Utah	13	–	5	.722	26	–	9	.743
UCLA	11	–	7	.611	22	–	14	.611
Stanford	9	–	9	.500	24	–	13	.649
Arizona State	9	–	9	.500	18	–	16	.529
Oregon State	8	–	10	.444	17	–	14	.548
California	7	–	11	.389	18	–	15	.545
Colorado	7	–	11	.389	16	–	18	.471
Washington State	7	–	11	.389	13	–	18	.419
Washington	5	–	13	.278	16	–	15	.516
USC	3	–	15	.167	12	–	20	.375
† Pac-12 Tournament winner Rankings from AP poll

The 2015 Pac-12 Conference men's basketball tournament was the postseason men's basketball tournament for the Pac-12 during the 2014–15 season. It was played on March 11–14, at the MGM Grand Garden Arena in Paradise, Nevada. The champion received an automatic bid to the 2015 NCAA tournament.

== Seeds ==
Seed	School	Conference	Overall	Tiebreaker
1	Arizona^{†#}	16–2	28–3	
2	Oregon^{#}	13–5	23–8	1–0 vs. Utah
3	Utah^{#}	13–5	23–7	0–1 vs. Oregon
4	UCLA^{#}	11–7	19–12	
5	Arizona State	9–9	17–14	1–1 vs. Stanford; 1–1 vs. Arizona
6	Stanford	9–9	18–12	1–1 vs. ASU; 0–2 vs. Arizona
7	Oregon State	8–10	17–13	
8	California	7–11	17–14	2–1 vs. WSU & Colorado
9	Washington State	7–11	13–17	2–2 vs. Cal & Colorado; 1–1 vs. Colorado; 0–1 vs. Arizona; 1–3 vs. Oregon & Utah
10	Colorado	7–11	14–16	1–2 vs. Cal & WSU; 1–1 vs. WSU; 0–2 vs. Arizona; 0–3 vs. Oregon & Utah
11	Washington	5–13	16–14	
12	USC	3–15	11–19	
† – Pac-12 regular season champions, and tournament No. 1 seed. # – Received a first round bye in the conference tournament. Overall records include all games played in the Pac-12 Tournament.

Teams seeded by conference record, with ties broken by record between the tied teams followed by record against the regular-season champion, if necessary.

== Schedule ==
Session	Game	Time*	Matchup^{#}	Final score	Television	Attendance
First round – Wednesday, March 11
1	1	12:00 pm	#8 California vs. #9 Washington State	84–59	Pac-12 Network	9,024
1	2	2:30 pm	#5 Arizona State vs. #12 USC	64–67	Pac-12 Network	9,024
2	3	6:00 pm	#7 Oregon State vs. #10 Colorado	71–78	Pac-12 Network	9,875
2	4	8:30 pm	#6 Stanford vs. #11 Washington	71–69	Pac-12 Network	9,875
Quarterfinals – Thursday, March 12
3	5	12:00 pm	#1 Arizona vs. #8 California	73–51	Pac-12 Network	12,916
3	6	2:30 pm	#4 UCLA vs. #12 USC	96–70	Pac-12 Network	12,916
4	7	6:00 pm	#2 Oregon vs. #10 Colorado	93–85	Pac-12 Network	12,916
4	8	8:30 pm	#3 Utah vs. #6 Stanford	80–56	ESPN	12,916
Semifinals – Friday, March 13
5	9	6:00 pm	#1 Arizona vs. #4 UCLA	70–64	Pac-12 Network	12,916
5	10	8:30 pm	#2 Oregon vs. #3 Utah	67–64	ESPN	12,916
Championship – Saturday, March 14
6	11	8:00 pm	#1 Arizona vs. #2 Oregon	80–52	ESPN	12,916
*Game times in PT. #-Rankings denote tournament seed

== Bracket ==
First round Wednesday March 11
8	California	84
9	Washington State	59
5	Arizona State	64
12	USC	67
7	Oregon State	71
10	Colorado	78
6	Stanford	71
11	Washington	69

Quarterfinals; Thursday March 12
1	#5 Arizona	73
8	California	51
4	UCLA	96
12	USC	70
2	Oregon	93
10	Colorado	85
3	#17 Utah	80
6	Stanford	56

Semifinals; Friday March 13
1	#5 Arizona	70
4	UCLA	64
2	Oregon	67
3	#17 Utah	64

Championship; Saturday March 14
1	#5 Arizona	80
2	Oregon	52

== Game statistics ==
=== First round ===
Pac-12 Network

March 11
12:00 PM PST

#8 California 84, #9 Washington State 59
Scoring by half: 1st: 37–26, 2nd: 47–33
Pts: David Kravish; 25; Rebs: David Kravish; 8 Asts: Tyrone Wallace; 7	Pts: Ike Iroegbu; 17; Rebs: Josh Hawkinson; 11; Asts: DaVonte Lacey; 2

MGM Grand Garden Arena

Pac-12 Network

March 11
2:30 PM PST

#5 Arizona State 64, #12 USC 67
Scoring by half: 1st: 38–28, 2nd: 26–39
Pts: Shaquielle McKissic; 16; Rebs: Shaquielle McKissic; 9 Asts: Tra Holder & Chance Murray; 3	Pts: Elijah Stewart; 27; Rebs: Darion Clark, Julian Jacobs & Nikola Jovanovic; 7 Asts: Julian Jacobs; 5

MGM Grand Garden Arena
Attendance: 9,024

Pac-12 Network

March 11
6:00 PM PST

#7 Oregon State 71, #10 Colorado 78
Scoring by half: 1st: 40–38, 2nd: 31–40
Pts: Malcolm Duvivier & Gary Payton II; 17; Rebs: Daniel Gomis; 6 Asts: Jarmal Reid; 4	Pts: Askia Booker; 20; Rebs: Josh Scott; 14; Asts: Askia Booker; 3

MGM Grand Garden Arena

Pac-12 Network

March 11
8:50 PM PST

#6 Stanford 71, #11 Washington 69
Scoring by half: 1st: 32–32, 2nd: 39–37
Pts: Stefan Nastic; 21; Rebs: Marcus Allen; 9 Asts: Chasson Randle; 6	Pts: Andrew Andrews; 22; Rebs: Mike Anderson; 10; Asts: Mike Anderson & Nigel Williams-Goss; 7

MGM Grand Garden Arena
Attendance: 9,875

=== Quarterfinals ===
Pac-12 Network

March 12
12:00 PM PST

#1 Arizona 73, #8 California 51
Scoring by half: 1st: 33–27, 2nd: 40–24
Pts: Stanley Johnson; 19; Rebs: Brandon Ashley, Stanley Johnson & Kaleb Tarczewski; 7 Asts: T. J. McConnell; 6	Pts: Tyrone Wallace; 19; Rebs: David Kravish; 12; Asts: Tyrone Wallace; 5

MGM Grand Garden Arena
Attendance: 12,916

Pac-12 Network

March 12
2:40 PM PST

#4 UCLA 90, #12 USC 76
Scoring by half: 1st: 47–29, 2nd: 49–41
Pts: Isaac Hamilton; 36; Rebs: Bryce Alford & György Golomán; 7 Asts: Bryce Alford; 7	Pts: Katin Reinhardt; 20; Rebs: Nikola Jovanovic; 6 Asts: Julian Jacobs; 7

MGM Grand Garden Arena
Attendance: 12,916

Pac-12 Network

March 12
6:00 PM PST

#2 Oregon 93, #10 Colorado 85
Scoring by half: 1st: 34–37, 2nd: 59–48
Pts: Joe Young; 30; Rebs: Dwayne Benjamin & Dillon Brooks; 8 Asts: Joe Young; 4	Pts: Josh Scott; 16; Rebs: Tre'Shaun Fletcher, Jaron Hopkins & Josh Scott; 6 Asts: Askia Booker; 5

MGM Grand Garden Arena
Attendance: 12,916

ESPN

March 12
8:40 PM PST

#3 Utah 80, #6 Stanford 56
Scoring by half: 1st: 34–39, 2nd: 46–17
Pts: Delon Wright; 20; Rebs: Jordan Loveridge; 8 Asts: Jordan Loveridge & Delon Wright; 5	Pts: Chasson Randle; 22; Rebs: Anthony Brown; 6 Asts: Anthony Brown, Robert Cartwright & Stefan Nastic; 2

MGM Grand Garden Arena
Attendance: 12,916

=== Semifinals ===
Pac-12 Network

March 13
6:00 PM PST

#1 Arizona 70, #4 UCLA 64
Scoring by half: 1st: 27–27, 2nd: 43–37
Pts: Brandon Ashley; 24; Rebs: Rondae Hollis-Jefferson; 12; Asts: T. J. McConnell; 11	Pts: Norman Powell; 21; Rebs: 5 tied; 4 Asts: Bryce Alford, Norman Powell & Thomas Welsh; 2

MGM Grand Garden Arena
Attendance: 12,916

ESPN

March 13
8:45 PM PST

#2 Oregon 67, #3 Utah 64
Scoring by half: 1st: 30–31, 2nd: 37–33
Pts: Joe Young; 25; Rebs: Dwayne Benjamin & Joe Young; 4 Asts: Joe Young; 3	Pts: Brandon Taylor; 24; Rebs: Jakob Poeltl; 8 Asts: Delon Wright; 5

MGM Grand Garden Arena
Attendance: 12,916

=== Championship game ===
ESPN

March 14
8:00 PM PST

#1 Arizona 80, #2 Oregon 52
Scoring by half: 1st: 36–21, 2nd: 44–31
Pts: Brandon Ashley; 20; Rebs: Rondae Hollis-Jefferson; 9 Asts: T. J. McConnell; 6	Pts: Joe Young; 19; Rebs: Dillon Brooks & Elgin Cook; 4 Asts: Joe Young; 4

MGM Grand Garden Arena
Attendance: 12,916

== Tournament notes ==
- For the first time since the conference expanded to 12 teams, the #12 seed (USC) won a game.
- Arizona's 28-point win (80-52) was the largest margin of victory in the conference championship game.
- Arizona won its fifth Pac Tournament, the first university to do so. The Wildcats have the most conference tournament championships.
- Arizona was the sixth school in the past seven years to win this tournament.

== All-tournament team ==
- Brandon Ashley, Arizona
- Rondae Hollis-Jefferson, Arizona
- Stanley Johnson, Arizona
- T. J. McConnell, Arizona
- Delon Wright, Utah
- Joe Young, Oregon

== Most outstanding player ==
- Brandon Ashley, Arizona

== Hall of Honor inductees ==
- Fred Snowden (Arizona head coach)
- Ron Riley (Arizona State)
- Sean Lampley (California)
- Jim Davis (Colorado)
- Anthony Taylor (Oregon)
- Jim Jarvis (Oregon State)
- Casey Jacobsen (Stanford)
- Dave Meyers (UCLA)
- Alex Hannum (USC)
- Danny Vranes (Utah)
- Jon Brockman (Washington)
- Bennie Seltzer (Washington State)
