= 2014–15 Colorado Buffaloes men's basketball team =

American college basketball season

2014–15 Colorado Buffaloes men's basketball

CBI, Second round
- Conference: Pac-12 Conference
- Record: 16–18 (7–11 Pac–12)
- Head coach: Tad Boyle (5th season)
- Assistant coaches: Jean Prioleau; Mike Rohn; Rodney Billups
- Home arena: Coors Events Center

2014–15 Pac-12 Conference men's basketball standings
	Conf.				Overall
Team	W		L	PCT	W		L	PCT
No. 5 Arizona †	16	–	2	.889	34	–	4	.895
No. 25 Oregon	13	–	5	.722	26	–	10	.722
No. 19 Utah	13	–	5	.722	26	–	9	.743
UCLA	11	–	7	.611	22	–	14	.611
Stanford	9	–	9	.500	24	–	13	.649
Arizona State	9	–	9	.500	18	–	16	.529
Oregon State	8	–	10	.444	17	–	14	.548
California	7	–	11	.389	18	–	15	.545
Colorado	7	–	11	.389	16	–	18	.471
Washington State	7	–	11	.389	13	–	18	.419
Washington	5	–	13	.278	16	–	15	.516
USC	3	–	15	.167	12	–	20	.375
† Pac-12 Tournament winner Rankings from AP poll

The 2014–15 Colorado Buffaloes men's basketball team represented the University of Colorado in the 2014–15 NCAA Division I men's basketball season. This was Tad Boyle's fifth year as head coach at Colorado. The Buffaloes played their home games at the Coors Events Center in Boulder, Colorado as members of the Pac-12 Conference. They finished the season 16–18, 7–11 in Pac-12 play to finish in a three-way tie for eighth place. They advanced to the quarterfinals of the Pac-12 tournament where they lost to Oregon. They were invited to the College Basketball Invitational where they defeated Gardner–Webb in the first round before losing in the second round to Seattle.

== Previous season ==
The 2013–14 Colorado Buffaloes finished the season with an overall record of 23–12, and 10–8 in the Pac-12 to finish in a five-way tie for third place. In the 2014 Pac-12 tournament, the team defeated USC in the first round and California in the quarterfinals before losing to Arizona, 63–43 in the semifinals. The Buffaloes received an at-large bid to the 2014 NCAA tournament as an #8 seed in the South Region, where they lost to Pittsburgh, 77–48 in the Round of 64.

== Off-season ==
=== Departures ===
Name	Number	Pos.	Height	Weight	Year	Hometown	Notes
Ben Mills	32	C	7’0”	230	Senior	Hartford, Wisconsin	Graduated.
Spencer Dinwiddie	25	PG	6'6"	200	Junior	Woodland Hills, California	Declared for 2014 NBA draft.

=== 2014 recruiting class ===
College recruiting information
Name	Hometown	School	Height	Weight	Commit date
Dominique Collier; PG	Denver, CO	East High School	6 ft 2 in (1.88 m)	166 lb (75 kg)	May 7, 2013
Dominique Collier; PG	Recruit ratings: Scout: Rivals: 247Sports: ESPN:				
Tory Miler; PF	Lee’s Summit, MO	New Hampton School	6 ft 8 in (2.03 m)	250 lb (110 kg)	Oct 19, 2013
Tory Miler; PF	Recruit ratings: Scout: Rivals: 247Sports: ESPN:				
Overall recruit ranking:
Note: In many cases, Scout, Rivals, 247Sports, On3, and ESPN may conflict in their listings of height and weight.; In these cases, the average was taken. ESPN grades are on a 100-point scale.; Sources: "2014 Team Ranking". Rivals.

== Roster ==
2014–15 Colorado Buffaloes men's basketball team
Players
Coaches

Pos.	#	Name	Height	Weight	Year	Previous school	Hometown
G	0	Askia Booker	6 ft 2 in (1.88 m)	175 lb (79 kg)	Sr	Price HS	Los Angeles, CA
F	1	Wesley Gordon	6 ft 9 in (2.06 m)	240 lb (109 kg)	RS So	Sierra HS	Colorado Springs, CO
G/F	2	Xavier Johnson	6 ft 7 in (2.01 m)	230 lb (104 kg)	Jr	Mater Dei HS	Los Angeles, CA
G	3	Xavier Talton	6 ft 2 in (1.88 m)	185 lb (84 kg)	Jr	Sterling HS	Sterling, CO
G	5	Eli Stalzer	6 ft 3 in (1.91 m)	195 lb (88 kg)	Jr	Mater Dei HS	Brea, CA
G/F	10	Tre'Shaun Fletcher	6 ft 7 in (2.01 m)	210 lb (95 kg)	So	Lincoln HS	Tacoma, WA
G	12	Kevin Nelson	6 ft 2 in (1.88 m)	190 lb (86 kg)	Sr	Albuquerque Academy	Albuquerque, NM
G/F	13	Dustin Thomas	6 ft 7 in (2.01 m)	225 lb (102 kg)	So	Pleasant Grove HS	Texarkana, TX
F	14	Tory Miller	6 ft 9 in (2.06 m)	255 lb (116 kg)	Fr	New Hampton School	Lee's Summit, MO
G	15	Brett Brady (W)	6 ft 1 in (1.85 m)	160 lb (73 kg)	Jr	Highlands Ranch HS	Highlands Ranch, CO
G	15	Dominique Collier	6 ft 2 in (1.88 m)	170 lb (77 kg)	Fr	East HS	Denver, CO
G	23	Jaron Hopkins	6 ft 6 in (1.98 m)	200 lb (91 kg)	So	Dobson HS	Mesa, AZ
G	24	George King	6 ft 6 in (1.98 m)	220 lb (100 kg)	So	Brennan HS	San Antonio, TX
G	33	Josh Repine (W)	6 ft 3 in (1.91 m)	180 lb (82 kg)	Fr	New Hampton School	Englewood, CO
G	35	Geoffrey Bates (W)	6 ft 3 in (1.91 m)	200 lb (91 kg)	RS Sr	Plano West HS	Plano, TX
F	40	Josh Scott	6 ft 10 in (2.08 m)	245 lb (111 kg)	Jr	Lewis-Palmer HS	Monument, CO
G	44	Josh Fortune (redshirt)	6 ft 5 in (1.96 m)	205 lb (93 kg)	Jr	Kecoughtan HS/Providence	Hampton, VA

Head coach

- Tad Boyle (Kansas)

Assistant coach(es)

- Jean Prioleau (Fordham)
- Mike Rohn (McPherson)
- Rodney Billups (Denver)

Legend

- (C) Team captain
- (S) Suspended
- (I) Ineligible
- (W) Walk-on
- Injured
- Current redshirt

Roster
Last update: 07/08/14

== Schedule ==
Date time, TV	Opponent	Result	Record	Site (attendance) city, state
Non-conference regular season
11/14/2014*; 6:00 pm, P12N	Drexel	W 68–45	1–0	Coors Events Center (10,058); Boulder, CO
11/17/2014*; 11:00 pm, ESPN2	Auburn; ESPN College Hoops Tip-Off Marathon	W 90–59	2–0	Coors Events Center (9,834); Boulder, CO
11/22/2014*; 4:00 pm, ESPN3	at Wyoming	L 33–56	2–1	Arena-Auditorium (9,066); Laramie, WY
11/25/2014*; 7:00 pm, P12N	Air Force	W 68–53	3–1	Coors Events Center (9,009); Boulder, CO
11/30/2014*; 12:00 pm, P12N	Lipscomb	W 84–75	4–1	Coors Events Center (8,403); Boulder, CO
12/03/2014*; 8:00 pm, P12N	San Francisco	W 72–55	5–1	Coors Events Center (9,025); Boulder, CO
12/07/2014*; 10:00 am, SECN	at Georgia	L 57–64	5–2	Stegeman Coliseum (5,687); Athens, GA
12/10/2014*; 7:00 pm, P12N	Colorado State	L 60–62	5–3	Coors Events Center (10,966); Boulder, CO
12/13/2014*; 4:00 pm, P12N	Northern Colorado	W 93–68	6–3	Coors Events Center (9,173); Boulder, CO
12/22/2014*; 2:30 pm, ESPNU	vs. DePaul; Diamond Head Classic Quarterfinals	W 82–68	7–3	Stan Sheriff Center (8,297); Honolulu, HI
12/23/2014*; 2:30 pm, ESPNU	vs. George Washington; Diamond Head Classic Semifinals	L 50–53	7–4	Stan Sheriff Center (7,875); Honolulu, HI
12/25/2014*; 4:30 pm, ESPN2	vs. Hawaii; Diamond Head Classic 3rd place game	L 66–69	7–5	Stan Sheriff Center (5,125); Honolulu, HI
Pac-12 regular season
01/02/2015; 8:00 pm, FS1	UCLA	W 62–56	8–5 (1–0)	Coors Events Center (10,191); Boulder, CO
01/04/2015; 12:00 pm, P12N	USC	W 86–65	9–5 (2–0)	Coors Events Center (9,866); Boulder, CO
01/07/2015; 7:00 pm, ESPN2	at No. 9 Utah	L 49–74	9–6 (2–1)	Jon M. Huntsman Center (13,876); Salt Lake City, UT
01/15/2015; 7:00 pm, ESPN	at No. 10 Arizona	L 54–68	9–7 (2–2)	McKale Center (14,655); Tucson, AZ
01/17/2015; 2:30 pm, P12N	at Arizona State	L 72–78	9–8 (2–3)	Wells Fargo Arena (7,651); Tempe, AZ
01/22/2015; 7:30 pm, FS1	Washington	L 50–52	9–9 (2–4)	Coors Events Center (9,653); Boulder, CO
01/24/2015; 6:00 pm, P12N	Washington State	W 90–58	10–9 (3–4)	Coors Events Center (9,571); Boulder, CO
01/29/2015; 7:30 pm, FS1	at USC	W 98–94 ^{3OT}	11–9 (4–4)	Galen Center (3,588); Los Angeles, CA
01/31/2015; 8:30 pm, P12N	at UCLA	L 59–72	11–10 (4–5)	Pauley Pavilion (9,057); Los Angeles, CA
02/07/2015; 8:00 pm, P12N	No. 13 Utah	L 51–79	11–11 (4–6)	Coors Events Center (9,907); Boulder, CO
02/12/2015; 7:00 pm, FS1	California	L 61–68	11–12 (4–7)	Coors Events Center (9,017); Boulder, CO
02/15/2015; 2:00 pm, FS1	Stanford	W 64–58	12–12 (5–7)	Coors Events Center (9,138); Boulder, CO
02/18/2015; 9:00 pm, ESPNU	at Oregon	L 60–73	12–13 (5–8)	Matthew Knight Arena (5,734); Eugene, OR
02/21/2015; 9:00 pm, P12N	at Oregon State	L 58–72	12–14 (5–9)	Gill Coliseum (7,117); Corvallis, OR
02/26/2015; 7:00 pm, ESPN	No. 7 Arizona	L 54–82	12–15 (5–10)	Coors Events Center (11,120); Boulder, CO
03/01/2015; 6:30 pm, ESPNU	Arizona State	W 87–81	13–15 (6–10)	Coors Events Center (9,087); Boulder, CO
03/05/2015; 7:00 pm, FS1	at Washington	W 64–47	14–15 (7–10)	Alaska Airlines Arena (5,848); Seattle, WA
03/07/2015; 4:30 pm, P12N	at Washington State	L 91–96 ^{OT}	14–16 (7–11)	Beasley Coliseum (3,434); Pullman, WA
Pac-12 tournament
03/11/2015; 7:00 pm, P12N	vs. Oregon State; First round	W 78–71	15–16	MGM Grand Garden Arena (9,875); Paradise, NV
03/12/2015; 7:00 pm, P12N	vs. Oregon; Quarterfinals	L 85–93	15–17	MGM Grand Garden Arena (12,916); Paradise, NV
College Basketball Invitational
03/18/2015*; 7:00 pm	Gardner–Webb; First round	W 87–78	16–17	Coors Events Center (1,280); Boulder, CO
03/23/2015*; 8:00 pm	at Seattle; Second round	L 65–72	16–18	Connolly Center (999); Seattle, WA
*Non-conference game. ^{#}Rankings from AP Poll. (#) Tournament seedings in parentheses. All times are in Mountain Time.
