= 2014–15 Washington Huskies men's basketball team =

American college basketball season

2014–15 Washington Huskies men's basketball

Wooden Legacy champions
- Conference: Pac-12 Conference
- Record: 16–15 (5–13 Pac-12)
- Head coach: Lorenzo Romar (13th season)
- Assistant coaches: Raphael Chillious; Brad Jackson; T. J. Otzelberger
- Home arena: Alaska Airlines Arena

2014–15 Pac-12 Conference men's basketball standings
	Conf.				Overall
Team	W		L	PCT	W		L	PCT
No. 5 Arizona †	16	–	2	.889	34	–	4	.895
No. 25 Oregon	13	–	5	.722	26	–	10	.722
No. 19 Utah	13	–	5	.722	26	–	9	.743
UCLA	11	–	7	.611	22	–	14	.611
Stanford	9	–	9	.500	24	–	13	.649
Arizona State	9	–	9	.500	18	–	16	.529
Oregon State	8	–	10	.444	17	–	14	.548
California	7	–	11	.389	18	–	15	.545
Colorado	7	–	11	.389	16	–	18	.471
Washington State	7	–	11	.389	13	–	18	.419
Washington	5	–	13	.278	16	–	15	.516
USC	3	–	15	.167	12	–	20	.375
† Pac-12 Tournament winner Rankings from AP poll

The 2014–15 Washington Huskies men's basketball team represented the University of Washington in the 2014–15 NCAA Division I men's basketball season. The Huskies were led by thirteenth-year head coach Lorenzo Romar. They played their home games at Alaska Airlines Arena at Hec Edmundson Pavilion as members of the Pac-12 Conference. They finished the season 16–15, 5–13 in Pac-12 play to finish in eleventh place. They lost in the first round of the Pac-12 tournament to Stanford.

== Previous season ==
The 2013–14 Washington Huskies finished the season with an overall record of 17–15, and 9–9 in the Pac-12 regular season. In the 2014 Pac-12 tournament, they were defeated by Utah, 67–61 in the first round.

== Off season ==
=== Departures ===
Name	Number	Pos.	Height	Weight	Year	Hometown	Reasn for departure
Perris Blackwell	2	C/F	6'9"	275	Senior	Etiwanda, CA	Graduated
C. J. Wilcox	23	SG	6'5"	195	RS senior	Pleasant Grove, UT	Graduated/2014 NBA draft
Desmond Simmons	30	SF	6'7"	225	RS junior	Vallejo, CA	Graduate transferred to Saint Mary's

=== Incoming transfers ===
Name	Number	Pos.	Height	Weight	Year	Hometown	Notes
Quevyn Winters	2	SF	6'6"	206	Junior	Milwaukee, WI	Junior college transfer from Indian Hills Community College.

== 2014 recruiting class ==
College recruiting
Name	Hometown	School	Height	Weight	Commit date
Tristan Etienne; PF	Abbotsford, BC	W. J. Mouat Secondary School	6 ft 10 in (2.08 m)	215 lb (98 kg)	Jul 4, 2013
Tristan Etienne; PF	Recruit ratings: Scout: Rivals: 247Sports: ESPN:				
Donaven Dorsey; SF	Lacey, WA	Timberline High School	6 ft 7 in (2.01 m)	215 lb (98 kg)	Jul 8, 2013
Donaven Dorsey; SF	Recruit ratings: Scout: Rivals: 247Sports: ESPN:				
Overall recruit ranking:
Note: In many cases, Scout, Rivals, 247Sports, On3, and ESPN may conflict in their listings of height and weight.; In these cases, the average was taken. ESPN grades are on a 100-point scale.; Sources: "2014 Team Ranking". Rivals.

== 2015 recruiting class ==
College recruiting (2015)
Name	Hometown	School	Height	Weight	Commit date
David Crisp; PG	Lakewood, WA	Brewster Academy	6 ft 1 in (1.85 m)	180 lb (82 kg)	Jan 12, 2014
David Crisp; PG	Recruit ratings: Scout: Rivals: 247Sports: ESPN:				
Marquese Chriss; PF	Elk Grove, CA	Pleasant Grove High School	6 ft 8 in (2.03 m)	200 lb (91 kg)	Jan 13, 2014
Marquese Chriss; PF	Recruit ratings: Scout: Rivals: 247Sports: ESPN:				
Dejounte Murray; SG	Seattle, WA	Rainier Beach High School	6 ft 5 in (1.96 m)	175 lb (79 kg)	Jun 3, 2014
Dejounte Murray; SG	Recruit ratings: Scout: Rivals: 247Sports: ESPN:				
Matisse Thybulle; SF	Sammamish, WA	Eastside Catholic School	6 ft 6 in (1.98 m)	185 lb (84 kg)	Sep 29, 2014
Matisse Thybulle; SF	Recruit ratings: Scout: Rivals: 247Sports: ESPN:				
Devenir Duruisseau; PF	Palmdale, CA	Fishburne Military School	6 ft 9 in (2.06 m)	240 lb (110 kg)	Oct 20, 2014
Devenir Duruisseau; PF	Recruit ratings: Scout: Rivals: 247Sports: ESPN:				
Malik Dime; PF	Columbus, OH	Indian Hills Community College	6 ft 8 in (2.03 m)	210 lb (95 kg)	Oct 20, 2014
Malik Dime; PF	Recruit ratings: Scout: Rivals: 247Sports: ESPN:				
Overall recruit ranking: Scout: 8 Rivals: 8 ESPN: 13
Note: In many cases, Scout, Rivals, 247Sports, On3, and ESPN may conflict in their listings of height and weight.; In these cases, the average was taken. ESPN grades are on a 100-point scale.; Sources: "2015 Washington Signees". Rivals.; "2015 Washington Signees". Scout.; "2015 Washington Signees". ESPN.; "Scout.com Team Recruiting Rankings". Scout.; "2015 Team Ranking". Rivals.

== Personnel ==
=== Roster ===
2014–15 Washington Huskies men's basketball team
Players
Coaches

Pos.	#	Name	Height	Weight	Year	Previous school	Hometown
G	1	Darin Johnson	6 ft 5 in (1.96 m)	200 lb (91 kg)	So	Sheldon HS	Sacramento, CA
F	2	Quevyn Winters	6 ft 5 in (1.96 m)	200 lb (91 kg)	Jr	Indian Hills CC	Milwaukee, WI
G	5	Nigel Williams-Goss	6 ft 3 in (1.91 m)	190 lb (86 kg)	So	Findlay Prep	Happy Valley, OR
G	10	Dan Kingma (W)	5 ft 10 in (1.78 m)	155 lb (70 kg)	Fr	Henry M. Jackson HS	Mill Creek, WA
G	11	Mike Anderson	6 ft 4 in (1.93 m)	205 lb (93 kg)	Sr	Moberly Area CC	Hartford, CT
G	12	Andrew Andrews	6 ft 2 in (1.88 m)	195 lb (88 kg)	RS Jr	Benson Poly HS	Portland, OR
G	15	KJ Garrett (W)	6 ft 3 in (1.91 m)	190 lb (86 kg)	Fr	Rolling Hills Prep	Manhattan Beach, CA
F	21	Jernard Jarreau	6 ft 10 in (2.08 m)	240 lb (109 kg)	RS Jr	McDonogh No. 35 Sr. HS	New Orleans, LA
F	22	Greg Bowman (W)	6 ft 5 in (1.96 m)	200 lb (91 kg)	Fr	Mountlake Terrace	Mountlake Terrace, WA
C	24	Robert Upshaw (D)	7 ft 0 in (2.13 m)	250 lb (113 kg)	RS So	Fresno State	Fresno, CA
G	33	Jahmel Taylor	6 ft 0 in (1.83 m)	170 lb (77 kg)	So	Pacific Hills School	Los Angeles, CA
C	34	Gilles Dierickx	7 ft 0 in (2.13 m)	230 lb (104 kg)	RS Jr	Florida International	Ghent, Belgium
F	40	Shawn Kemp Jr.	6 ft 9 in (2.06 m)	255 lb (116 kg)	Sr	Hargrave Military Acad.	Canton, GA
F	42	Donaven Dorsey	6 ft 7 in (2.01 m)	215 lb (98 kg)	Fr	Timberline HS	Lacey, WA

Head coach

- Lorenzo Romar (Washington)

Assistant coach(es)

- Raphael Chillious (Lafayette)
- Brad Jackson (Washington State)
- T. J. Otzelberger (Wisconsin-Whitewater)

Legend

- (C) Team captain
- (S) Suspended
- (I) Ineligible
- (W) Walk-on
- (D) Dismissed
- Injured
- Current redshirt

Roster
Last update: 01/26/2015

==== Notes ====
- On January 26, Head Coach Lorenzo Romar announced that Sophomore center, Robert Upshaw would be dismissed from the team due to violation of team rules.

=== Coaching staff ===
Name	Position	Year at Washington	Alma mater (year)
Lorenzo Romar	Head coach	13th	Washington (1980)
Raphael Chillious	Assistant coach	5th	Lafayette (1996)
Brad Jackson	Assistant coach	3rd	Washington State (1975)
T. J. Otzelberger	Assistant coach	2nd	Wisconsin-Whitewater (2001)
Tiffani Walker	Director of basketball operations	1st	Illinois (2003)
Da'Mon Perry	Director of player development	1st	Whittier (2012)
Daniel Shapiro	Strength and conditioning coach	2nd	Seattle Pacific (2000)

== Schedule ==
Date time, TV	Rank^{#}	Opponent^{#}	Result	Record	Site (attendance) city, state
Exhibition
11/06/2014*; 7:30 pm, P12N		Saint Martin's	W 88–65	–	Alaska Airlines Arena (4,072); Seattle, WA
Non-conference regular season
11/14/2014*; 7:00 pm, P12N		South Carolina State	W 77–59	1–0	Alaska Airlines Arena (2,898); Seattle, WA
11/21/2014*; 7:00 pm, KZJO		at Seattle; Elgin Baylor Classic	W 63–48	2–0	KeyArena (5,319); Seattle, WA
11/23/2014*; 5:00 pm, P12N		vs. Pacific; Marv Harshman Classic	W 76–69	3–0	KeyArena (2,512); Seattle, WA
11/27/2014*; 8:00 pm, ESPN2		vs. San Jose State; Wooden Legacy quarterfinals	W 78–56	4–0	Titan Gym (2,241); Fullerton, CA
11/28/2014*; 8:30 pm, ESPN2		vs. Long Beach State; Wooden Legacy semifinals	W 80–70	5–0	Titan Gym (2,430); Fullerton, CA
11/30/2014*; 7:00 pm, ESPN2		vs. UTEP; Wooden Legacy championship	W 68–65	6–0	Honda Center (2,191); Anaheim, CA
12/07/2014*; 6:00 pm, P12N		No. 13 San Diego State	W 49–36	7–0	Alaska Airlines Arena (6,199); Seattle, WA
12/14/2014*; 5:00 pm, P12N	No. 17	Eastern Washington	W 81–77	8–0	Alaska Airlines Arena (6,184); Seattle, WA
12/17/2014*; 8:00 pm, P12N	No. 16	Grambling State	W 86–38	9–0	Alaska Airlines Arena (5,289); Seattle, WA
12/20/2014*; 6:00 pm, ESPNU	No. 16	vs. No. 15 Oklahoma; MGM Grand Garden Showcase	W 69–67	10–0	MGM Grand Garden Arena (N/A); Paradise, NV
12/22/2014*; 8:00 pm, P12N	No. 13	Tulane	W 66–57	11–0	Alaska Airlines Arena (7,130); Seattle, WA
12/28/2014*; 5:00 pm, P12N	No. 13	Stony Brook	L 57–62	11–1	Alaska Airlines Arena (6,970); Seattle, WA
Pac-12 regular season
01/02/2015; 7:00 pm, P12N	No. 21	at California	L 75–81	11–2 (0–1)	Haas Pavilion (8,005); Berkeley, CA
01/04/2015; 7:00 pm, ESPNU	No. 21	at Stanford	L 60–68 ^{OT}	11–3 (0–2)	Maples Pavilion (4,368); Stanford, CA
01/10/2015; 12:00 pm, P12N		Washington State; Rivalry	L 77–80	11–4 (0–3)	Alaska Airlines Arena (7,595); Seattle, WA
01/15/2015; 6:00 pm, P12N		Oregon State	W 56–43	12–4 (1–3)	Alaska Airlines Arena (6,663); Seattle, WA
01/18/2015; 5:30 pm, ESPNU		Oregon	W 85–77	13–4 (2–3)	Alaska Airlines Arena (6,912); Seattle, WA
01/22/2015; 6:30 pm, FS1		at Colorado	W 52–50	14–4 (3–3)	Coors Events Center (9,653); Boulder, CO
01/25/2015; 5:30 pm, ESPNU		at No. 12 Utah	L 56–77	14–5 (3–4)	Jon M. Huntsman Center (13,047); Salt Lake City, UT
01/28/2015; 8:00 pm, ESPNU		Stanford	L 74–84	14–6 (3–5)	Alaska Airlines Arena (6,832); Seattle, WA
02/01/2015; 12:00 pm, P12N		California	L 88–90	14–7 (3–6)	Alaska Airlines Arena (6,319); Seattle, WA
02/04/2015; 6:00 pm, ESPN2		at Oregon	L 74–78	14–8 (3–7)	Matthew Knight Arena (5,866); Eugene, OR
02/08/2015; 1:30 pm, FS1		at Oregon State	L 50–64	14–9 (3–8)	Gill Coliseum (9,114); Corvallis, OR
02/13/2015; 6:00 pm, ESPN		No. 7 Arizona	L 62–86	14–10 (3–9)	Alaska Airlines Arena (6,999); Seattle, WA
02/15/2015; 2:30 pm, P12N		Arizona State	L 68–78	14–11 (3–10)	Alaska Airlines Arena (6,745); Seattle, WA
02/22/2015; 5:30 pm, ESPNU		at Washington State; Rivalry	W 87–84	15–11 (4–10)	Beasley Coliseum (5,567); Pullman, WA
02/25/2015; 8:00 pm, ESPN2		at UCLA	L 66–88	15–12 (4–11)	Pauley Pavilion (7,841); Los Angeles, CA
02/28/2015; 7:00 pm, P12N		at USC	L 55–70	15–13 (4–12)	Galen Center (5,529); Los Angeles, CA
03/05/2015; 6:00 pm, FS1		Colorado	L 47–64	15–14 (4–13)	Alaska Airlines Arena (5,848); Seattle, WA
03/07/2015; 1:30 pm, P12N		No. 13 Utah	W 77–68	16–14 (5–13)	Alaska Airlines Arena (7,386); Seattle, WA
Pac-12 Tournament
03/11/2015; 8:30 pm, P12N		vs. Stanford; First round	L 69–71	16–15	MGM Grand Garden Arena (9,875); Paradise, NV
*Non-conference game. ^{#}Rankings from AP Poll. (#) Tournament seedings in parentheses. All times are in Pacific Time.

== Ranking movement ==
Legend: ██ Increase in ranking. ██ Decrease in ranking.
Poll	Pre	Wk 2	Wk 3	Wk 4	Wk 5	Wk 6	Wk 7	Wk 8	Wk 9	Wk 10	Wk 11	Wk 12	Wk 13	Wk 14	Wk 15	Wk 16	Wk 17	Wk 18	Wk 19	Final
AP	NR	NR	NR	RV	17	16	13	21	RV	NR	RV	NR	NR	NR	NR	NR	NR	NR	NR	N/A
Coaches	NR	NR	NR	RV	17	16	13	19	RV	NR	NR	NR	NR	NR	NR	NR	NR	NR	NR	NR

== See also ==
- 2014–15 Washington Huskies women's basketball team
