= 2014–15 USC Trojans men's basketball team =

American college basketball season

2014–15 USC Trojans men's basketball
- Conference: Pac-12 Conference
- Record: 12–20 (3–15 Pac-12)
- Head coach: Andy Enfield (2nd season)
- Assistant coaches: Tony Bland; Jason Hart; Kevin Norris
- Home arena: Galen Center

2014–15 Pac-12 Conference men's basketball standings
	Conf.				Overall
Team	W		L	PCT	W		L	PCT
No. 5 Arizona †	16	–	2	.889	34	–	4	.895
No. 25 Oregon	13	–	5	.722	26	–	10	.722
No. 19 Utah	13	–	5	.722	26	–	9	.743
UCLA	11	–	7	.611	22	–	14	.611
Stanford	9	–	9	.500	24	–	13	.649
Arizona State	9	–	9	.500	18	–	16	.529
Oregon State	8	–	10	.444	17	–	14	.548
California	7	–	11	.389	18	–	15	.545
Colorado	7	–	11	.389	16	–	18	.471
Washington State	7	–	11	.389	13	–	18	.419
Washington	5	–	13	.278	16	–	15	.516
USC	3	–	15	.167	12	–	20	.375
† Pac-12 Tournament winner Rankings from AP poll

The 2014–15 USC Trojans men's basketball team represented the University of Southern California during the 2014–15 NCAA Division I men's basketball season. They were led by second-year head coach Andy Enfield. They played their home games at the Galen Center and were members of the Pac-12 Conference. They finished the season 12–20, 3–15 in Pac-12 play to finish in last place. They advanced to the quarterfinals of the Pac-12 tournament where they lost to UCLA.

== Previous season ==
The 2013–14 USC Trojans finished the season with an overall record of 11–21, and 2–16 in the Pac-12 regular season. In the 2014 Pac-12 tournament, the team was defeated by Colorado, 56–59 in the first round.

== Off Season ==
=== Departures ===
Name	Number	Pos.	Height	Weight	Year	Hometown	Notes
D. J. Haley	33	C	7’0”	250	Senior	Palmdale, California	Graduated.
Pe’Shon Howard	10	G	6’3”	190	Senior	Los Angeles, California	Graduated.
Daniel Munoz	24	G	5’10”	175	Senior	Coto de Caza, California	Graduated.
Omar Oraby	55	C	7’2”	250	Senior	Cairo, Egypt	Graduated.
Roschon Prince	2	F	6’5”	210	Freshman	Long Beach, California	Elected to transfer to Long Beach State.
J. T. Terrell	20	G	6’3”	185	Senior	Burlington, North Carolina	Graduated.
Byron Wesley	22	G	6'5"	210	Junior	Rancho Cucamonga, California	Transferred to Gonzaga.

=== 2014 Recruiting Class ===
College recruiting
Name	Hometown	School	Height	Weight	Commit date
Malik Price-Martin; PF	Miami, FL	Northeast High School	6 ft 9 in (2.06 m)	215 lb (98 kg)	Jul 28, 2013
Malik Price-Martin; PF	Recruit ratings: Scout: Rivals: 247Sports: ESPN:				
Jordan McLaughlin; PG	Rancho Cucamonga, CA	Etiwanda High School	6 ft 0 in (1.83 m)	170 lb (77 kg)	Sep 11, 2013
Jordan McLaughlin; PG	Recruit ratings: Scout: Rivals: 247Sports: ESPN:				
Jabari Craig; C	Toronto, ON	Fishburne Military School	6 ft 11 in (2.11 m)	235 lb (107 kg)	Oct 10, 2013
Jabari Craig; C	Recruit ratings: Scout: Rivals: 247Sports: ESPN:				
Malik Marquetti; SF	Long Beach, CA	Millikan Senior High School	6 ft 6 in (1.98 m)	185 lb (84 kg)	Dec 29, 2013
Malik Marquetti; SF	Recruit ratings: Scout: Rivals: 247Sports: ESPN:				
Elijah Stewart; SG	Los Angeles, CA	Westchester High School	6 ft 5 in (1.96 m)	165 lb (75 kg)	May 18, 2014
Elijah Stewart; SG	Recruit ratings: Scout: Rivals: 247Sports: ESPN:				
Overall recruit ranking:
Note: In many cases, Scout, Rivals, 247Sports, On3, and ESPN may conflict in their listings of height and weight.; In these cases, the average was taken. ESPN grades are on a 100-point scale.; Sources: "2014 Team Ranking". Rivals.

== Roster ==
2014–15 USC Trojans men's basketball team
Players
Coaches

Pos.	#	Name	Height	Weight	Year	Hometown
F	0	Darion Clark	6 ft 7 in (2.01 m)	220 lb (100 kg)	RS So	Conyers, GA
G	1	Katin Reinhardt	6 ft 5 in (1.96 m)	205 lb (93 kg)	RS So	Dana Point, CA
F	2	Malik Price-Martin	6 ft 11 in (2.11 m)	220 lb (100 kg)	Fr	Miami, FL
G	3	Chass Bryan (W)	5 ft 11 in (1.8 m)	165 lb (75 kg)	Jr	Oak Park, CA
G	5	Kahlil Dukes	6 ft 0 in (1.83 m)	170 lb (77 kg)	So	Hartford, CT
G	11	Jordan McLaughlin	6 ft 1 in (1.85 m)	170 lb (77 kg)	Fr	Rancho Cucamonga, CA
G	12	Julian Jacobs	6 ft 4 in (1.93 m)	180 lb (82 kg)	So	Las Vegas, NV
F	13	Samar Dhillon (W)	6 ft 7 in (2.01 m)	200 lb (91 kg)	So	Sacramento, CA
F	14	Strahinja Gavrilović	6 ft 9 in (2.06 m)	230 lb (104 kg)	Jr	Kragujevac, SER
G	15	Brendyn Taylor	6 ft 3 in (1.91 m)	185 lb (84 kg)	Jr	Los Angeles, CA
G	21	Devon Pflueger (W)	6 ft 6 in (1.98 m)	195 lb (88 kg)	So	San Juan Capistrano, CA
F	24	Malik Marquetti	6 ft 6 in (1.98 m)	190 lb (86 kg)	Fr	Compton, CA
G	30	Elijah Stewart	6 ft 5 in (1.96 m)	180 lb (82 kg)	Fr	Los Angeles, CA
F	32	Nikola Jovanović	6 ft 11 in (2.11 m)	230 lb (104 kg)	So	Belgrade, SER

Head coach

- Andy Enfield (Johns Hopkins)

Assistant coach(es)

- Tony Bland (San Diego State)
- Jason Hart (Syracuse)
- Kevin Norris (Miami (FL))

Legend

- (C) Team captain
- (S) Suspended
- (I) Ineligible
- (W) Walk-on
- Injured
- Current redshirt

Roster

== Schedule ==
Date time, TV	Opponent	Result	Record	Site (attendance) city, state
Exhibition
11/08/2014*; 1:00 PM	Cal State Los Angeles	W 87–68		Galen Center; Los Angeles, CA
Non-conference regular season
11/15/2014*; 7:30 PM, P12N	Portland State	L 68–76	0–1	Galen Center (2,811); Los Angeles, CA
11/17/2014*; 8:00 PM, P12N	Tennessee Tech	W 70–58	1–1	Galen Center (2,267); Los Angeles, CA
11/20/2014*; 9:30 AM, ESPN3	vs. Akron; Charleston Classic quarterfinals	L 46–66	1–2	TD Arena (1,131); Charleston, SC
11/21/2014*; 9:00 AM, ESPN3	vs. Drexel; Charleston Classic consolation round	W 72–70	2–2	TD Arena (855); Charleston, SC
11/23/2014*; 12:30 PM, ESPN3	vs. Penn State; Charleston Classic 5th place game	L 61–63	2–3	TD Arena (1,220); Charleston, SC
11/25/2014*; 8:00 PM, P12N	Cal State Fullerton	W 53–49	3–3	Galen Center (2,297); Los Angeles, CA
11/30/2014*; 1:00 PM, CBSSN	at New Mexico	W 66–54	4–3	The Pit (14,404); Albuquerque, NM
12/03/2014*; 7:00 PM, P12N	Loyola Marymount	W 77–61	5–3	Galen Center (2,537); Los Angeles, CA
12/07/2014*; 2:00 PM, P12N	Utah State	W 89–84	6–3	Galen Center (3,189); Los Angeles, CA
12/13/2014*; 7:30 PM, P12N	Army	L 77–85 ^{OT}	6–4	Galen Center (4,233); Los Angeles, CA
12/21/2014*; 1:00 PM, ESPNU	at Boston College	W 75–71	7–4	Conte Forum (3,577); Chestnut Hill, MA
12/30/2014*; 8:30 PM, P12N	Vermont	W 64–56	8–4	Galen Center (4,553); Los Angeles, CA
Pac-12 regular season
01/02/2015; 7:00 PM, ESPNU	at No. 10 Utah	L 55–79	8–5 (0–1)	Jon M. Huntsman Center (14,140); Salt Lake City, UT
01/04/2015; 11:00 AM, P12N	at Colorado	L 65–86	8–6 (0–2)	Coors Events Center (9,866); Boulder, CO
01/07/2015; 8:00 PM, ESPNU	California	W 71–57	9–6 (1–2)	Galen Center (3,355); Los Angeles, CA
01/11/2015; 7:00 PM, ESPNU	Stanford	L 76–78	9–7 (1–3)	Galen Center (3,987); Los Angeles, CA
01/14/2015; 6:00 PM, ESPN2	UCLA; UCLA–USC rivalry	L 66–83	9–8 (1–4)	Galen Center (6,253); Los Angeles, CA
01/22/2015; 8:00 PM, P12N	at Oregon	L 67–75	9–9 (1–5)	Matthew Knight Arena (5,652); Eugene, OR
01/24/2015; 3:00 PM, P12N	at Oregon State	L 55–59	9–10 (1–6)	Gill Coliseum (8,877); Corvallis, OR
01/29/2015; 6:30 PM, FS1	Colorado	L 94–98 ^{3OT}	9–11 (1–7)	Galen Center (3,588); Los Angeles, CA
02/01/2015; 11:30 AM, ESPNU	No. 11 Utah	L 39–67	9–12 (1–8)	Galen Center (2,835); Los Angeles, CA
02/05/2015; 8:00 PM, FS1	at California	L 69–70	9–13 (1–9)	Haas Pavilion (9,326); Berkeley, CA
02/08/2015; 5:30 PM, ESPNU	at Stanford	L 62–70	9–14 (1–10)	Maples Pavilion (5,409); Stanford, CA
02/11/2015; 6:00 PM, ESPN2	Oregon	L 75–80	9–15 (1–11)	Galen Center (2,836); Los Angeles, CA
02/14/2015; 2:00 PM, P12N	Oregon State	W 68–55	10–15 (2–11)	Galen Center (3,831); Los Angeles, CA
02/19/2015; 6:00 PM, P12N	at No. 7 Arizona	L 57–87	10–16 (2–12)	McKale Center (14,655); Tucson, AZ
02/22/2014; 5:30 PM, P12N	at Arizona State	L 59–64	10–17 (2–13)	Wells Fargo Arena (5,527); Tempe, AZ
02/25/2015; 7:00 PM, P12N	Washington State	L 66–70	10–18 (2–14)	Galen Center (2,735); Los Angeles, CA
02/28/2015; 7:00 PM, P12N	Washington	W 70–55	11–18 (3–14)	Galen Center (5,529); Los Angeles, CA
03/04/2015; 6:00 PM, ESPN2	at UCLA; UCLA–USC Rivalry	L 74–85	11–19 (3–15)	Pauley Pavilion (10,734); Los Angeles, CA
Pac-12 tournament
03/11/2015; 2:30 PM, P12N	vs. Arizona State; First round	W 67–64	12–19	MGM Grand Garden Arena (9,024); Paradise, NV
03/12/2015; 2:30 PM, P12N	vs. UCLA; Quarterfinals	L 70–96	12–20	MGM Grand Garden Arena (12,916); Paradise, NV
*Non-conference game. ^{#}Rankings from AP Poll. (#) Tournament seedings in parentheses. All times are in Pacific Time.
