= 2014–15 California Golden Bears men's basketball team =

American college basketball season

2014–15 California Golden Bears men's basketball
- Conference: Pac-12 Conference
- Record: 18–15 (7–11 Pac-12)
- Head coach: Cuonzo Martin (1st year)
- Assistant coaches: Jon Harris (1st year); Tracy Webster (1st year); Yanni Hufnagel (1st year)
- Home arena: Haas Pavilion

2014–15 Pac-12 Conference men's basketball standings
	Conf.				Overall
Team	W		L	PCT	W		L	PCT
No. 5 Arizona †	16	–	2	.889	34	–	4	.895
No. 25 Oregon	13	–	5	.722	26	–	10	.722
No. 19 Utah	13	–	5	.722	26	–	9	.743
UCLA	11	–	7	.611	22	–	14	.611
Stanford	9	–	9	.500	24	–	13	.649
Arizona State	9	–	9	.500	18	–	16	.529
Oregon State	8	–	10	.444	17	–	14	.548
California	7	–	11	.389	18	–	15	.545
Colorado	7	–	11	.389	16	–	18	.471
Washington State	7	–	11	.389	13	–	18	.419
Washington	5	–	13	.278	16	–	15	.516
USC	3	–	15	.167	12	–	20	.375
† Pac-12 Tournament winner Rankings from AP poll

The 2014–15 California Golden Bears men's basketball team represented the University of California, Berkeley in the 2014–15 NCAA Division I men's basketball season. This was Cuonzo Martin's first year as head coach at California. The Golden Bears played their home games at Haas Pavilion as members of the Pac-12 Conference. They finished the season 18–15, 7–11 in Pac-12 play to finish in a three-way tie for eighth place. They advanced to the quarterfinals of the Pac-12 tournament, where they lost to Arizona.

== Previous season ==
The 2013–14 California Golden Bears finished the season with an overall record of 21–14, and 10–8 in Pac-12 play to finish in a five-way tie for third place. They lost in the quarterfinals of the Pac-12 tournament to Colorado. They received an at-large bid to the 2014 National Invitation Tournament, where they defeated Utah Valley in the first round and Arkansas in the second round before losing in the quarterfinals to SMU.

On March 31, 2014, Head Coach Mike Montgomery announced his retirement from coaching.

== Off Season ==
=== Departures ===
Name	Number	Pos.	Height	Weight	Hometown	Year	Notes
Justin Cobbs	1	G	6’3”	190	Los Angeles, California	RS senior	Graduated
Ricky Kreklow	24	G	6’6”	210	Los Angeles, California	RS junior	Transferred
Jeff Powers	21	G	6’7”	235	Clayton, California	RS senior	Graduated
Richard Solomon	35	F	6'10"	235	Los Angeles, California	Senior	Graduated

=== 2014 recruiting class ===
College recruiting
Name	Hometown	School	Height	Weight	Commit date
Kingsley Okoroh; C	Watford, England	Westwind Prep Academy	7 ft 1 in (2.16 m)	245 lb (111 kg)	Apr 15, 2014
Kingsley Okoroh; C	Recruit ratings: Scout: Rivals: 247Sports: ESPN:				
Brandon Chauca; PG	Greenville, SC	Shannon Forest Christian School	5 ft 9 in (1.75 m)	165 lb (75 kg)	May 30, 2014
Brandon Chauca; PG	Recruit ratings: Scout: Rivals: 247Sports: ESPN:				
Overall recruit ranking:
Note: In many cases, Scout, Rivals, 247Sports, On3, and ESPN may conflict in their listings of height and weight.; In these cases, the average was taken. ESPN grades are on a 100-point scale.; Sources: "2014 California Basketball Commitment List". Rivals.; "2014 California Recruitment List". Scout.; "2014 California Recruiting Class". ESPN.; "Scout.com Team Recruiting Rankings". Scout.; "2014 Team Ranking". Rivals.

== Roster ==
2014–15 California Golden Bears men's basketball team
Players
Coaches

Pos.	#	Name	Height	Weight	Year	Previous school	Hometown
F	1	Dwight Tarwater	6 ft 6 in (1.98 m)	230 lb (104 kg)	RS Sr	Cornell University	Knoxville, Tennessee
G	2	Sam Singer	6 ft 4 in (1.93 m)	204 lb (93 kg)	So	Ransom Everglades School	Miami, Florida
G	3	Tyrone Wallace	6 ft 5 in (1.96 m)	200 lb (91 kg)	Jr	Bakersfield High School	Bakersfield, California
G	10	Brandon Chauca	5 ft 9 in (1.75 m)	160 lb (73 kg)	Fr	Shannon Forest Christian School	Alexandria, Virginia
F	12	Roger Moute a Bidias	6 ft 6 in (1.98 m)	207 lb (94 kg)	So	Notre Dame Prep	Yaoundé, Cameroon
F	14	Christian Behrens	6 ft 8 in (2.03 m)	226 lb (103 kg)	RS Jr	Tahoma Senior High School	Maple Valley, Washington
C	22	Kingsley Okoroh	7 ft 1 in (2.16 m)	254 lb (115 kg)	Fr	Westwind Preparatory Academy	Derby, England
G	23	Jabari Bird	6 ft 6 in (1.98 m)	198 lb (90 kg)	So	Salesian High School	Richmond, California
G	24	Jordan Mathews	6 ft 3 in (1.91 m)	205 lb (93 kg)	So	Santa Monica High School	San Francisco, California
G	25	Nick Hamilton (W)	6 ft 4 in (1.93 m)	185 lb (84 kg)	Fr	Westchester High School	Los Angeles, California
G	31	Stephen Domingo (redshirt)	6 ft 7 in (2.01 m)	210 lb (95 kg)	Jr	Georgetown University	San Francisco, California
F	42	Cole Welle (W)	6 ft 7 in (2.01 m)	204 lb (93 kg)	Fr	Aptos High School	Aptos, California
C	44	Kameron Rooks (injured)	7 ft 0 in (2.13 m)	261 lb (118 kg)	So	Mission Hills High School	San Marcos, California
F	45	David Kravish	6 ft 10 in (2.08 m)	240 lb (109 kg)	Sr	Lee's Summit North High School	Lee's Summit, Missouri

Head coach

- Cuonzo Martin

Assistant coach(es)

- Tracy Webster
- Jon Harris
- Yanni Hufnagel

Legend

- (C) Team captain
- (S) Suspended
- (I) Ineligible
- (W) Walk-on
- Injured
- Current redshirt

Roster
Last update: 09/19/2014

== Schedule ==
Date time, TV	Opponent	Result	Record	High points	High rebounds	High assists	Site (attendance) city, state
Exhibition
Oct. 31*; 7:00 p.m.	Cal State East Bay	W 94–50	–	21 – Tied	9 – Okoroh	3 – Tied	Haas Pavilion; Berkeley, CA
Nov. 6*; 7:30 p.m., P12N	Cal State San Marcos	W 74–52	–	13 – Tied	6 – Tied	6 – Singer	Haas Pavilion; Berkeley, CA
Non-conference regular season
Nov. 14*; 7:00 p.m., P12N	Alcorn State; 2K Sports Classic	W 91–57	1–0	22 – Wallace	10 – Wallace	9 – Bird	Haas Pavilion (7,212); Berkeley, CA
Nov. 16*; 7:00 p.m., P12N	Kennesaw State; 2K Sports Classic	W 93–59	2–0	18 – Wallace	9 – Wallace	7 – Wallace	Haas Pavilion (4,944); Berkeley, CA
Nov. 20*; 6:00 p.m., ESPN2	vs. No. 23 Syracuse; 2K Sports Classic Semifinals	W 73–59	3–0	22 – Mathews	9 – Kravish	6 – Wallace	Madison Square Garden (11,541); New York City, NY
Nov. 21*; 4:00 p.m., ESPN2	vs. No. 10 Texas; 2K Sports Classic Championship	L 55–71	3–1	19 – Kravish	8 – Wallace	4 – Wallace	Madison Square Garden (11,255); New York City, NY
Nov. 26*; 7:00 p.m., P12N	Cal Poly	W 72–52	4–1	18 – Bird	9 – Behrens	5 – Wallace	Haas Pavilion (5,712); Berkeley, CA
Nov. 30*; 3:00 p.m., CBSSN	at Fresno State	W 64–57	5–1	21 – Wallace	10 – Wallace	6 – Singer	Save Mart Center (5,741); Fresno, CA
Dec. 3*; 7:00 p.m., P12N	Montana	W 78–76 ^{2OT}	6–1	22 – Wallace	15 – Wallace	6 – Chauca	Haas Pavilion (5,837); Berkeley, CA
Dec. 7*; 1:00 p.m., CBSSN	at Nevada	W 63–56	7–1	29 – Wallace	9 – Behrens	4 – Wallace	Lawlor Events Center (5,467); Reno, NV
Dec. 10*; 8:00 p.m., P12N	Wyoming	W 45–42	8–1	17 – Wallace	8 – Tied	5 – Wallace	Haas Pavilion (6,648); Berkeley, CA
Dec. 13*; 5:30 p.m., P12N	Princeton	W 67–57	9–1	23 – Wallace	8 – Wallace	4 – Singer	Haas Pavilion (7,459); Berkeley, CA
Dec. 19*; 7:00 p.m., P12N	Eastern Washington	W 78–67	10–1	21 – Wallace	11 – Wallace	3 – Wallace	Haas Pavilion (6,758); Berkeley, CA
Dec. 22*; 6:00 p.m., ESPN2	No. 6 Wisconsin	L 56–68	10–2	17 – Wallace	7 – Wallace	2 – Wallace	Haas Pavilion (11,877); Berkeley, CA
Dec. 28*; 12:30 p.m., P12N	CSU Bakersfield	L 52–55	10–3	17 – Wallace	10 – Kravish	3 – Tied	Haas Pavilion (6,902); Berkeley, CA
Pac-12 regular season
Jan. 2; 7:00 p.m., P12N	No. 21 Washington	W 81–75	11–3 (1–0)	31 – Mathews	10 – Kravish	4 – Tied	Haas Pavilion (8,005); Berkeley, CA
Jan. 4; 3:00 p.m., P12N	Washington State	L 66–69	11–4 (1–1)	24 – Mathews	10 – Kravish	6 – Wallace	Haas Pavilion (7,618); Berkeley, CA
Jan. 7; 8:00 p.m., ESPNU	at USC	L 57–71	11–5 (1–2)	21 – Wallace	7 – Kravish	3 – Tarwater	Galen Center (3,355); Los Angeles, CA
Jan. 11; 4:30 p.m., FS1	at UCLA	L 54–73	11–6 (1–3)	23 – Mathews	14 – Kravish	3 – Tied	Pauley Pavilion (11,093); Los Angeles, CA
Jan. 14; 8:00 p.m., ESPNU	Stanford; Rivalry	L 59–69	11–7 (1–4)	14 – Wallace	9 – Tied	3 – Tied	Haas Pavilion (8,819); Berkeley, CA
Jan. 22; 8:00 p.m., P12N	Arizona State	L 44–79	11–8 (1–5)	11 – Mathews	7 – Wallace	2 – Tied	Haas Pavilion (7,469); Berkeley, CA
Jan. 24; 7:30 p.m., P12N	No. 7 Arizona	L 50–73	11–9 (1–6)	16 – Tied	11 – Kravish	4 – Wallace	Haas Pavilion (11,877); Berkeley, CA
Jan. 29; 8:00 p.m., P12N	at Washington State	W 76–67	12–9 (2–6)	26 – Wallace	8 – Bird	3 – Chauca	Beasley Coliseum (2,957); Pullman, WA
Feb. 1; 12:00 p.m., P12N	at Washington	W 90–88	13–9 (3–6)	23 – Mathews	9 – Tied	5 – Singer	Alaska Airlines Arena (6,319); Seattle, WA
Feb. 5; 8:00 p.m., FS1	USC	W 70–69	14–9 (4–6)	18 – Wallace	8 – Kravish	5 – Bird	Haas Pavilion (9,326); Berkeley, CA
Feb. 7; 5:00 p.m., P12N	UCLA	W 64–62	15–9 (5–6)	16 – Bird	10 – Wallace	6 – Wallace	Haas Pavilion (10,853); Berkeley, CA
Feb. 12; 6:00 p.m., FS1	at Colorado	W 68–61	16–9 (6–6)	22 – Mathews	7 – Kravish	6 – Singer	Coors Events Center (9,017); Boulder, CO
Feb. 15; 5:30 p.m., ESPNU	at No. 11 Utah	L 61–76	16–10 (6–7)	26 – Wallace	7 – Wallace	3 – Singer	Jon M. Huntsman Center (14,159); Salt Lake City, UT
Feb. 21; 3:30 p.m., P12N	at Stanford; Rivalry	L 61–72	16–11 (6–8)	23 – Kravish	12 – Kravish	4 – Wallace	Maples Pavilion (6,177); Stanford, CA
Feb. 25; 8:00 p.m., ESPNU	Oregon	L 69–80	16–12 (6–9)	22 – Bird	7 – Wallace	5 – Wallace	Haas Pavilion (8,566); Berkeley, CA
Mar. 1; 12:00 p.m., P12N	Oregon State; Senior Night	W 73–56	17–12 (7–9)	17 – Mathews	13 – Kravish	7 – Wallace	Haas Pavilion (9,893); Berkeley, CA
Mar. 5; 6:00 p.m., ESPN	at No. 5 Arizona	L 60–99	17–13 (7–10)	16 – Wallace	10 – Behrens	3 – Wallace	McKale Center (14,655); Tucson, AZ
Mar. 7; 11:30 a.m., P12N	at Arizona State	L 70–74	17–14 (7–11)	23 – Wallace	7 – Tarwater	6 – Wallace	Wells Fargo Arena (5,619); Tempe, AZ
Pac-12 tournament
Mar. 11; 12:00 p.m., P12N	vs. Washington State; First round	W 84–59	18–14	25 – Kravish	8 – Kravish	7 – Wallace	MGM Grand Garden Arena (9,024); Paradise, NV
Mar. 12; 12:00 p.m., P12N	vs. No. 5 Arizona; Quarterfinals	L 51–73	18–15	19 – Wallace	12 – Kravish	5 – Wallace	MGM Grand Garden Arena (12,916); Paradise, NV
*Non-conference game. ^{#}Rankings from AP Poll. (#) Tournament seedings in parentheses. All times are in Pacific Time.

== See also ==
- 2014–15 California Golden Bears women's basketball team
