= 2014–15 Pac-12 Conference men's basketball season =

2014–15 Pac-12 men's basketball season
- League: NCAA Division I
- Sport: Basketball
- Teams: 12
- TV partner(s): ESPN, Fox Sports 1, CBS, Pac-12 Network

Regular Season
- Season champions: Arizona
- Runners-up: Oregon; Utah
- Season MVP: Joe Young, Oregon
- Top scorer: Joe Young

Tournament
- Champions: Arizona
- Runners-up: Oregon
- Finals MVP: Brandon Ashley, Arizona

Basketball seasons
- ← 13–14 15–16 →

2014–15 Pac-12 Conference men's basketball standings
	Conf.				Overall
Team	W		L	PCT	W		L	PCT
No. 5 Arizona †	16	–	2	.889	34	–	4	.895
No. 25 Oregon	13	–	5	.722	26	–	10	.722
No. 19 Utah	13	–	5	.722	26	–	9	.743
UCLA	11	–	7	.611	22	–	14	.611
Stanford	9	–	9	.500	24	–	13	.649
Arizona State	9	–	9	.500	18	–	16	.529
Oregon State	8	–	10	.444	17	–	14	.548
California	7	–	11	.389	18	–	15	.545
Colorado	7	–	11	.389	16	–	18	.471
Washington State	7	–	11	.389	13	–	18	.419
Washington	5	–	13	.278	16	–	15	.516
USC	3	–	15	.167	12	–	20	.375
† Pac-12 Tournament winner Rankings from AP poll

The 2014–15 Pac-12 Conference men's basketball season began with practices in October 2014 and ended with the 2015 Pac-12 Conference men's basketball tournament in March 2015 at the MGM Grand Garden Arena in Paradise, Nevada. The regular season began on the first weekend of November 2014, with the conference schedule starting in December 2014.

This was the fourth season under the Pac-12 Conference name and the 56th since the conference was established under its current charter as the Athletic Association of Western Universities in 1959. Including the history of the Pacific Coast Conference, which operated from 1915 to 1959 and is considered by the Pac-12 as a part of its own history, this is the Pac-12's 100th season of men's basketball.

== Preseason ==
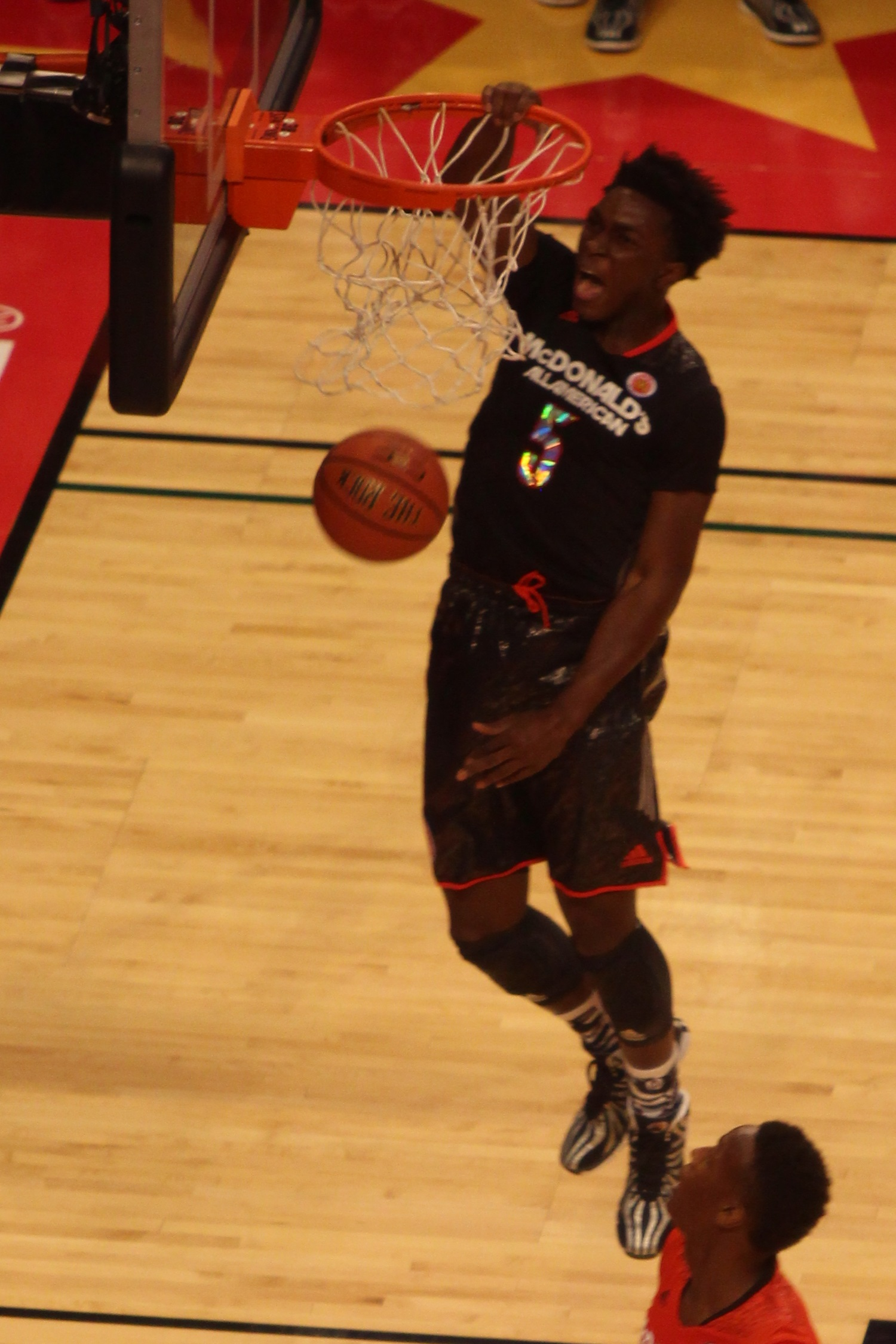
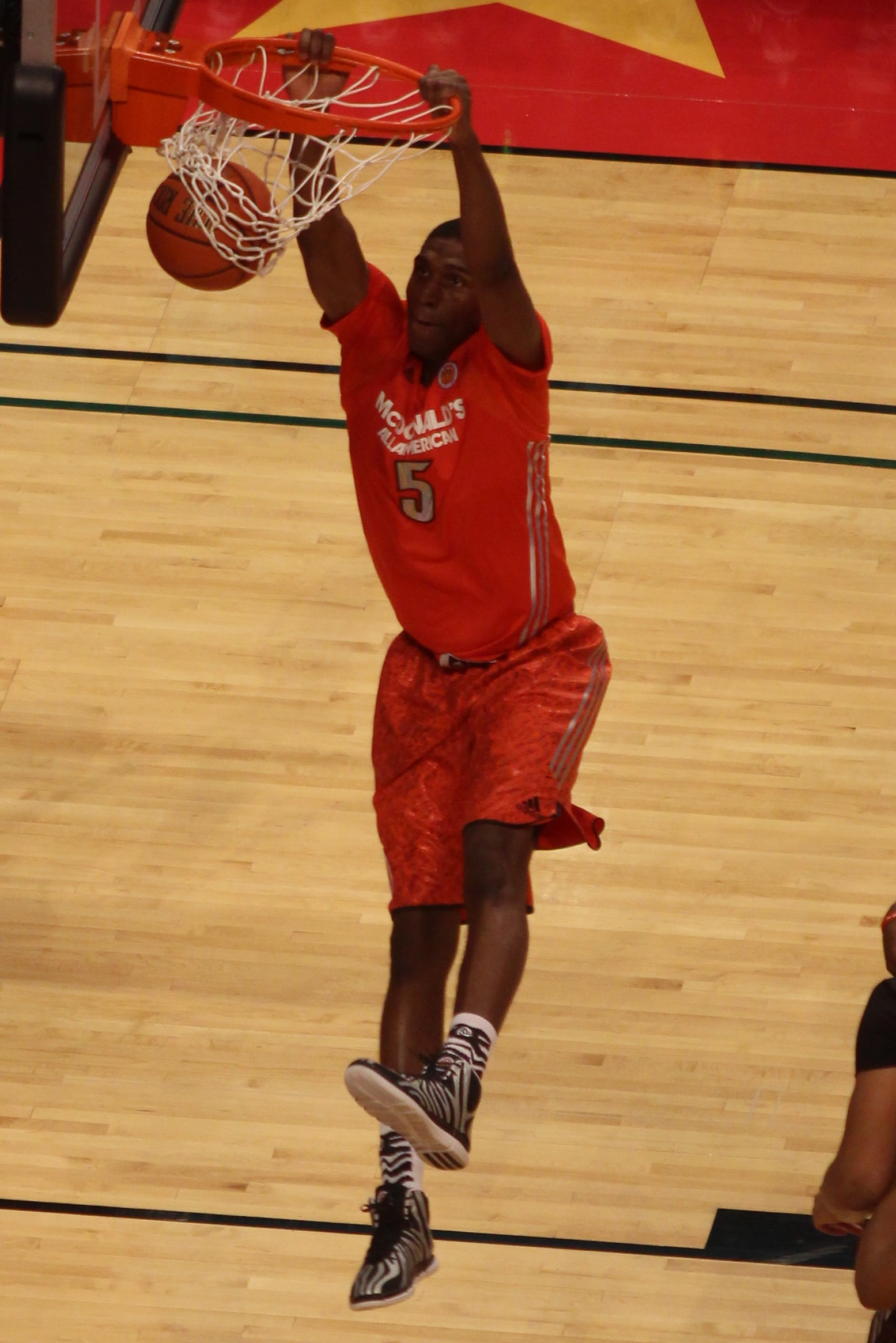
Freshman recruits Stanley Johnson (black jersey) of Arizona and Kevon Looney of UCLA at the 2014 McDonald's All-American Boys Game
- October 23, 2014 – Pac-12 Men's Basketball Media Day, Pac-12 Networks Studios, San Francisco, California.

Men’s Basketball Media Preseason Poll
Place	Team	Points	First place votes
1	Arizona	383	(31)
2	Utah	317	
3	Colorado	316	
4	UCLA	290	(1)
5	Stanford	264	
6	Washington	189	
7	California	188	
8	Oregon	159	
9	Arizona State	155	
10	USC	106	
11	Washington State	84	
12	Oregon State	45	

() first place votes

== Rankings ==
Legend
	Improvement in ranking
	Drop in ranking
RV	Received votes but were not ranked in Top 25 of poll

		Pre	Wk 2	Wk 3	Wk 4	Wk 5	Wk 6	Wk 7	Wk 8	Wk 9	Wk 10	Wk 11	Wk 12	Wk 13	Wk 14	Wk 15	Wk 16	Wk 17	Wk 18	Wk 19	Final
Arizona	AP	2	2	3	3	3	3	3	8	7	10	7	6	6	7	7	7	5	5	5	-
Arizona	C	2	2	4	3	3	3	3	7	6	9	7	6	6	7	7	7	6	6	4	4
Arizona State	AP	NR	NR	NR	NR	NR	NR	NR	NR	NR	NR	NR	NR	NR	NR	NR	NR	NR	NR	NR	-
Arizona State	C	NR	NR	NR	NR	NR	NR	NR	NR	NR	NR	NR	NR	NR	NR	NR	NR	NR	NR	NR	NR
California	AP	NR	NR	RV	RV	RV	RV	RV	RV	NR	NR	NR	NR	NR	NR	NR	NR	NR	NR	NR	-
California	C	NR	NR	RV	RV	RV	RV	RV	RV	RV	NR	NR	NR	NR	NR	NR	NR	NR	NR	NR	NR
Colorado	AP	RV	RV	NR	NR	NR	NR	NR	NR	NR	NR	NR	NR	NR	NR	NR	NR	NR	NR	NR	-
Colorado	C	RV	RV	RV	NR	NR	NR	NR	NR	NR	NR	NR	NR	NR	NR	NR	NR	NR	NR	NR	NR
Oregon	AP	NR	NR	NR	NR	NR	NR	NR	NR	NR	RV	NR	NR	NR	NR	NR	RV	RV	RV	RV	-
Oregon	C	RV	RV	RV	NR	NR	NR	NR	NR	RV	NR	NR	NR	NR	NR	NR	RV	RV	RV	25	25
Oregon State	AP	NR	NR	NR	NR	NR	NR	NR	NR	NR	NR	NR	NR	NR	NR	NR	NR	NR	NR	NR	-
Oregon State	C	NR	NR	NR	NR	NR	NR	NR	NR	NR	NR	NR	NR	NR	NR	NR	NR	NR	NR	NR	NR
Stanford	AP	RV	RV	RV	NR	NR	NR	NR	RV	RV	NR	RV	RV	RV	NR	NR	NR	NR	NR	NR	-
Stanford	C	RV	RV	RV	RV	NR	NR	NR	RV	RV	RV	25	RV	RV	NR	NR	NR	NR	NR	NR	NR
UCLA	AP	RV	RV	22	RV	NR	NR	NR	NR	NR	NR	NR	NR	NR	NR	NR	NR	NR	NR	NR	-
UCLA	C	RV	RV	23	RV	RV	NR	NR	NR	NR	NR	NR	NR	NR	NR	NR	NR	NR	NR	NR	RV
USC	AP	NR	NR	NR	NR	NR	NR	NR	NR	NR	NR	NR	NR	NR	NR	NR	NR	NR	NR	NR	-
USC	C	NR	NR	NR	NR	NR	NR	NR	NR	NR	NR	NR	NR	NR	NR	NR	NR	NR	NR	NR	NR
Utah	AP	25	25	RV	25	13	14	14	10	9	8	12	11	13	11	9	13	13	17	19	-
Utah	C	RV	RV	RV	RV	14	14	14	12	11	8	11	10	11	10	9	12	13	17	18	15
Washington	AP	NR	NR	NR	RV	17	16	13	21	RV	NR	RV	NR	NR	NR	NR	NR	NR	NR	NR	-
Washington	C	NR	NR	RV	RV	17	16	13	19	RV	NR	NR	NR	NR	NR	NR	NR	NR	NR	NR	NR
Washington State	AP	NR	NR	NR	NR	NR	NR	NR	NR	NR	NR	NR	NR	NR	NR	NR	NR	NR	NR	NR	-
Washington State	C	NR	NR	NR	NR	NR	NR	NR	NR	NR	NR	NR	NR	NR	NR	NR	NR	NR	NR	NR	NR

== Pac-12 regular season ==
=== Conference Schedule ===
This table summarizes the head-to-head results between teams in conference play.

	Arizona	Arizona St	California	Colorado	Oregon	Oregon St	Stanford	UCLA	USC	Utah	Washington	Washington St
vs. Arizona	–	1–1	0–2	0–2	0–2	1–1	0–2	0–1	0–1	0–2	0–1	0–1
vs. Arizona State	1–1	–	0–2	1–1	2–0	1–1	1–1	0–1	0–1	2–0	0–1	1–0
vs. California	2–0	2–0	–	0–1	1–0	0–1	2–0	1–1	1–1	1–0	0–2	1–1
vs. Colorado	2–0	1–1	1–0	–	1–0	1–0	0–1	1–1	0–2	2–0	1–0	0–1
vs. Oregon	2–0	0–2	0–1	0–1	–	0–2	0–1	1–1	0–2	0–1	1–1	1–1
vs. Oregon State	1–1	1–1	1–0	0–1	2–0	–	1–0	1–1	1–1	1–0	1–1	0–2
vs. Stanford	2–0	1–1	0–2	1–0	1–0	0–1	–	2–0	0–2	1–0	0–2	1–1
vs. UCLA	1–0	1–0	1–1	1–1	1–1	1–1	0–2	–	0–2	1–1	0–1	0–1
vs. USC	1–0	1–0	1–1	2–0	2–0	1–1	2–0	2–0	–	2–0	0–1	1–0
vs. Utah	2–0	0–2	0–1	0–2	1–0	0–1	0–1	1–1	0–2	–	1–1	0–2
vs. Washington	1–0	1–0	2–0	1–1	1–1	1–1	2–0	1–0	1–0	1–1	–	1–1
vs. Washington State	1–0	0–1	1–1	1–1	1–1	2–0	1–1	1–0	0–1	2–0	1–1	–
Total	16–2	9–9	7–11	7–11	13–5	8–10	9–9	11–7	3–15	13–5	5–13	7–11

== Head coaches ==
Sean Miller, Arizona
Herb Sendek, Arizona State
Cuonzo Martin, California
Tad Boyle, Colorado
Dana Altman, Oregon
Wayne Tinkle, Oregon State

Johnny Dawkins, Stanford
Steve Alford, UCLA
Andy Enfield, USC
Larry Krystkowiak, Utah
Lorenzo Romar, Washington
Ernie Kent, Washington State

== Postseason ==
=== Pac-12 tournament ===
The conference tournament is scheduled for Wednesday–Saturday, March 11–14, 2015 at the MGM Grand Garden Arena, Paradise, Nevada. Arizona, and Oregon were seeded one and two respectively. The top four teams had a bye on the first day, March 11. Teams were seeded by conference record, with ties broken by record between the tied teams followed by record against the regular-season champion, if necessary.

First round Wednesday March 11
8	California	84
9	Washington State	59
5	Arizona State	64
12	USC	67
7	Oregon State	71
10	Colorado	78
6	Stanford	71
11	Washington	69

Quarterfinals; Thursday March 12
1	#5 Arizona	73
8	California	51
4	UCLA	96
12	USC	70
2	Oregon	93
10	Colorado	85
3	#17 Utah	80
6	Stanford	56

Semifinals; Friday March 13
1	#5 Arizona	70
4	UCLA	64
2	Oregon	67
3	#17 Utah	64

Championship; Saturday March 14
1	#5 Arizona	80
2	Oregon	52

=== NCAA tournament ===
Seed	Region	School	Second round	Third round	Sweet 16	Elite Eight	Final Four	Championship
2	West	Arizona	#15 Texas Southern, W 93–72	#10 Ohio State, W 73–58	# 6 Xavier, W 68–60	#1 Wisconsin, L 78–85	N/A	N/A
8	West	Oregon	#9 Oklahoma State, W 79–73	#1 Wisconsin, L 62–72	N/A	N/A	N/A	N/A
5	South	Utah	#12 Stephen F. Austin, W 57–50	#4 Georgetown, W 75–64	#1 Duke, L 57–61	N/A	N/A	N/A
11	South	UCLA	#6 SMU, W 60–59	#14 UAB, W 92–75	#2 Gonzaga, L 62–74	N/A	N/A	N/A
	4 Bids	W-L (%):	4–0 1.000	3–1 .750	1–2 .333	0–1 .000	0–0 –	TOTAL: 8–4 .667

=== National Invitation tournament ===
Seed	Bracket	School	First round	Second round	Quarterfinals	Semifinals	Finals
2	Richmond	Stanford	vs UC Davis, W 77–64	vs Rhode Island, W 74–65	vs Vanderbilt, W 78–75	Old Dominion, W 67–60	Miami (FL), W 66–64 ^{OT}
5	Colorado State	Arizona State	at Connecticut, W 68–61	at Richmond, L 70–76 ^{OT}	N/A	N/A	N/A
	2 Bids	W-L (%):	2–0 1.000	1–1 .500	1–0 1.000	1–0 1.000	TOTAL: 6–1 .857

=== College Basketball Invitational ===
Seed	Bracket	School	First round	Second round	Quarterfinals	Semifinals	Finals
		Colorado	vs Gardner-Webb, W 87–78	at Seattle L 65–72	N/A	N/A	N/A
	1 Bid	W-L (%):	1–0 1.000	0–1 .000	0–0 –	0–0 –	TOTAL: 1–1 .500

== Awards and honors ==
- The Pac-12 Coach of the Year Award in both men’s and women’s basketball is now known as the John Wooden Coach of the Year Award.

=== Scholar-Athlete of the Year ===
- Chasson Randle, Sr., Stanford

=== Player-of-the-Week ===
- Nov. 17: Tyrone Wallace, Jr., California
- Nov. 24: Norman Powell, Sr., UCLA
- Dec. 1: Stanley Johnson, Fr., Arizona
- Dec. 8: Tyrone Wallace, Jr., California (2)
- Dec. 15: Delon Wright, Sr., Utah
- Dec. 22: Elijah Stewart, Fr., USC
- Dec. 29: Anthony Brown, Sr., Stanford
- Jan. 5: Chasson Randle, Sr., Stanford
- Jan. 12: Kevon Looney, Fr., UCLA
- Jan. 19: Stanley Johnson, Fr., Arizona (2)
- Jan. 26: Gary Payton II, Jr., Oregon State
- Feb. 2: Norman Powell, Sr., UCLA (2)
- Feb. 9: Joe Young, Sr., Oregon
- Feb. 16: Rondae Hollis-Jefferson, So., Arizona
- Feb. 23: Andrew Andrews, RS Jr., Washington
- Mar. 2: Norman Powell, Sr., UCLA (3)
- Mar. 9: Shaquielle McKissic, Sr., Arizona State

=== All-Americans ===
- Delon Wright, Utah, First team (Sporting News), second team (United States Basketball Writers Association)
- Joe Young, Third team (Sporting News)

=== All-Pac-12 teams ===
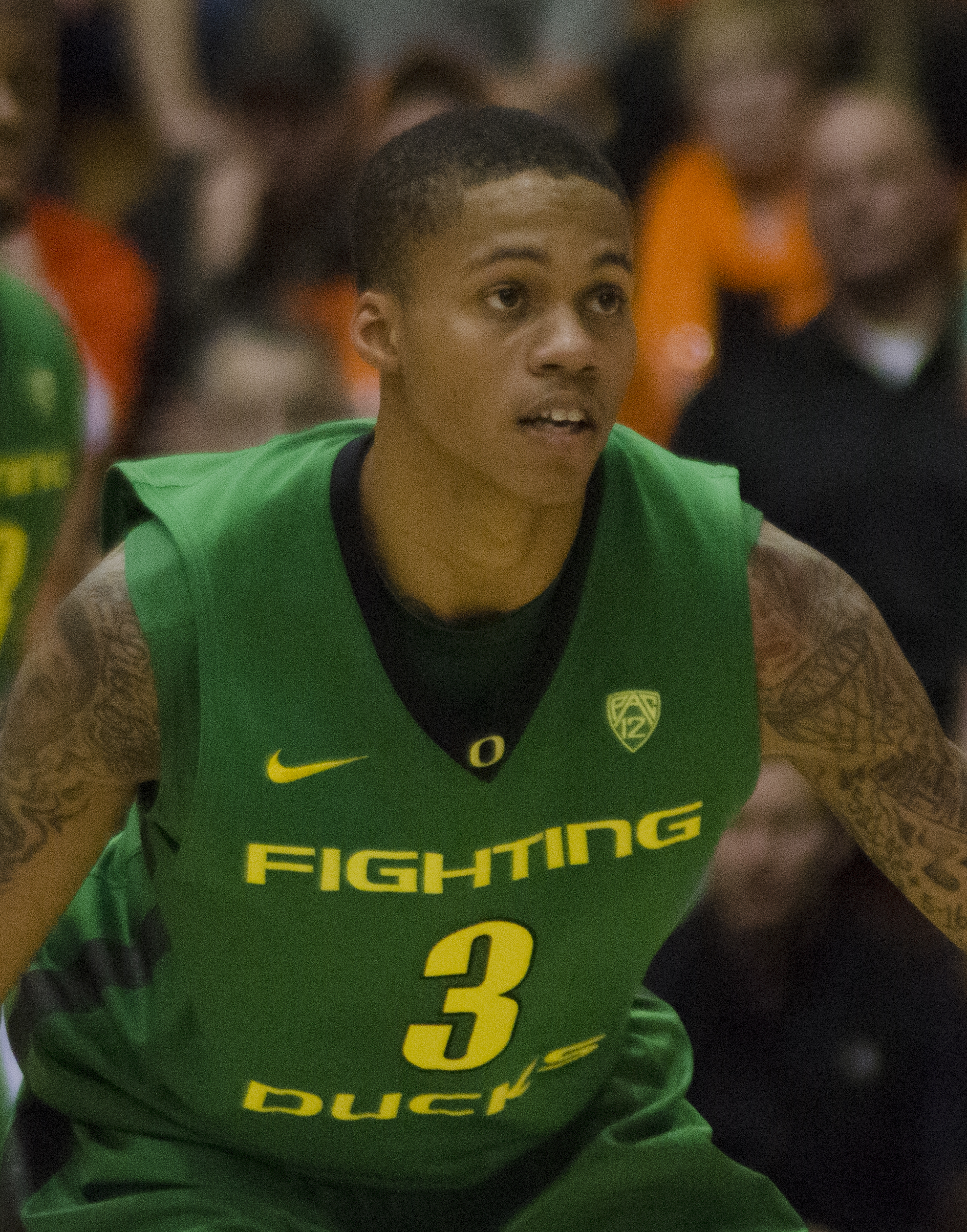
Player of the Year Joe Young of Oregon

Voting was by conference coaches:

- Player of The Year: Joe Young, Oregon
- Freshman of The Year: Stanley Johnson, Arizona
- Defensive Player of The Year: Gary Payton II, Oregon State
- Most Improved Player of The Year: Josh Hawkinson, Washington State
- John R. Wooden Coach of the Year: Dana Altman, Oregon

==== First Team ====
Name	School	Pos.	Yr.	Ht., Wt.	Hometown (Last School)
Rondae Hollis-Jefferson	Arizona	F	So.	6-7, 220	Chester, Pa. (Chester HS)
Stanley Johnson	Arizona	F	Fr.	6-7, 245	Fullerton, Calif. (Mater Dei HS)
DaVonté Lacy	Washington State	G	Sr.	6-4, 210	Tacoma, Wash. (Curtis HS)
T. J. McConnell	Arizona	G	Sr.	6-1, 195	Pittsburgh, Pa. (Duquesne)
Gary Payton II	Oregon State	G	Jr.	6-3, 175	Las Vegas, Nev. (Salt Lake CC)
Norman Powell	UCLA	G	Sr.	6-4, 215	San Diego, Calif. (Lincoln HS)
Chasson Randle	Stanford	G	Sr.	6-2, 185	Rock Island, Ill. (Rock Island HS)
Tyrone Wallace	California	G	Jr.	6-5, 200	Bakersfield, Calif. (Bakersfield HS)
Delon Wright	Utah	G	Sr.	6-5, 190	Lawndale, Calif. (City College of San Francisco)
Joe Young	Oregon	G	Sr.	6-2, 180	Houston, Texas (Houston)

==== Pac-12 All-Freshman Team ====
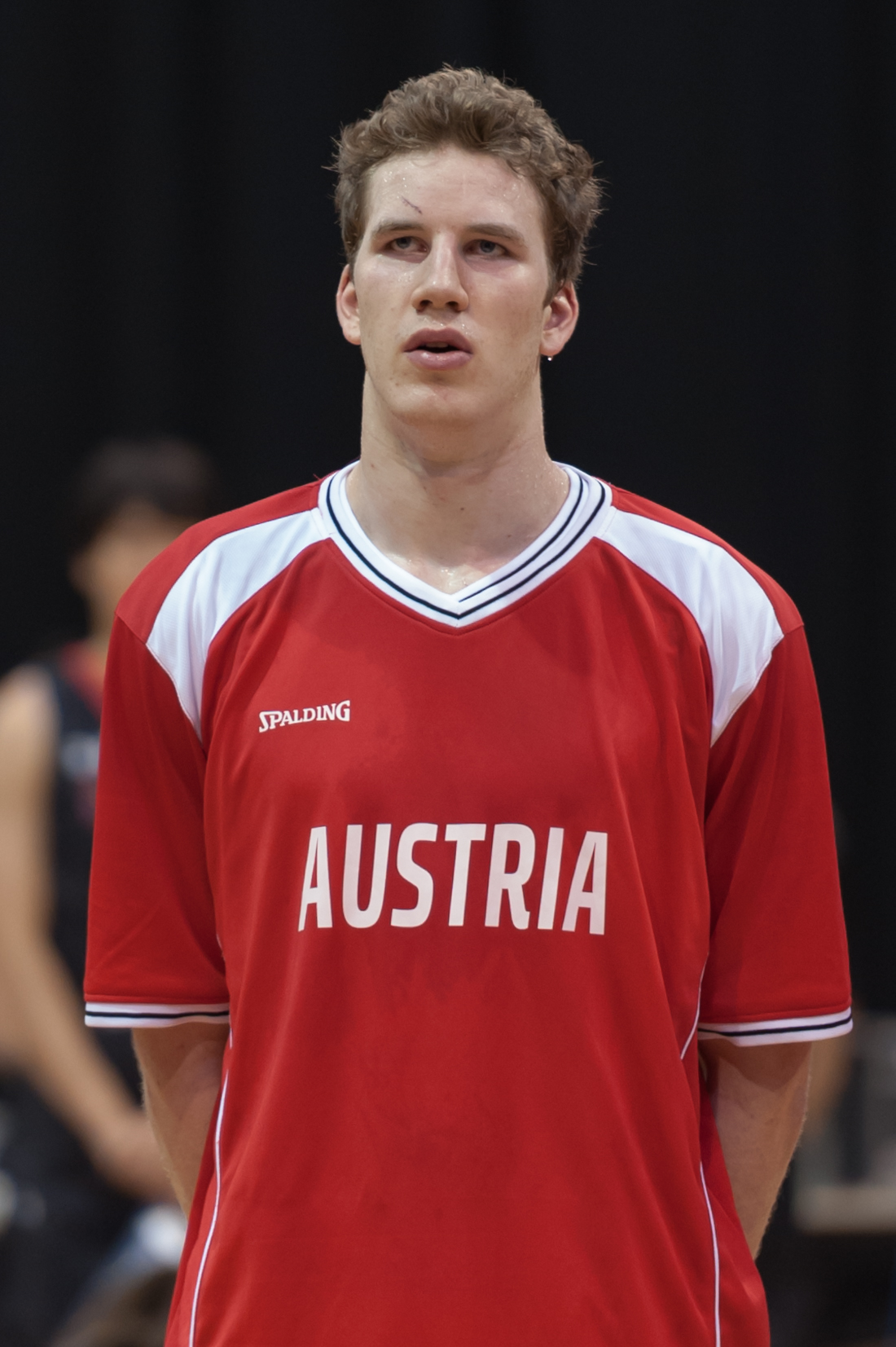
Jakob Pöltl of Utah

Name	School	Pos.	Ht., Wt.
Jordan Bell	Oregon	F	6-9, 215
Dillon Brooks	Oregon	F	6-6, 225
Tra Holder	Arizona State	G	6-1, 180
Stanley Johnson	Arizona	F	6-7, 245
Kevon Looney	UCLA	F	6-9, 220
Jordan McLaughlin	USC	G	6-1, 170
Jakob Pöltl	Utah	F	7-0, 235

==== Pac-12 All-Defensive Team ====
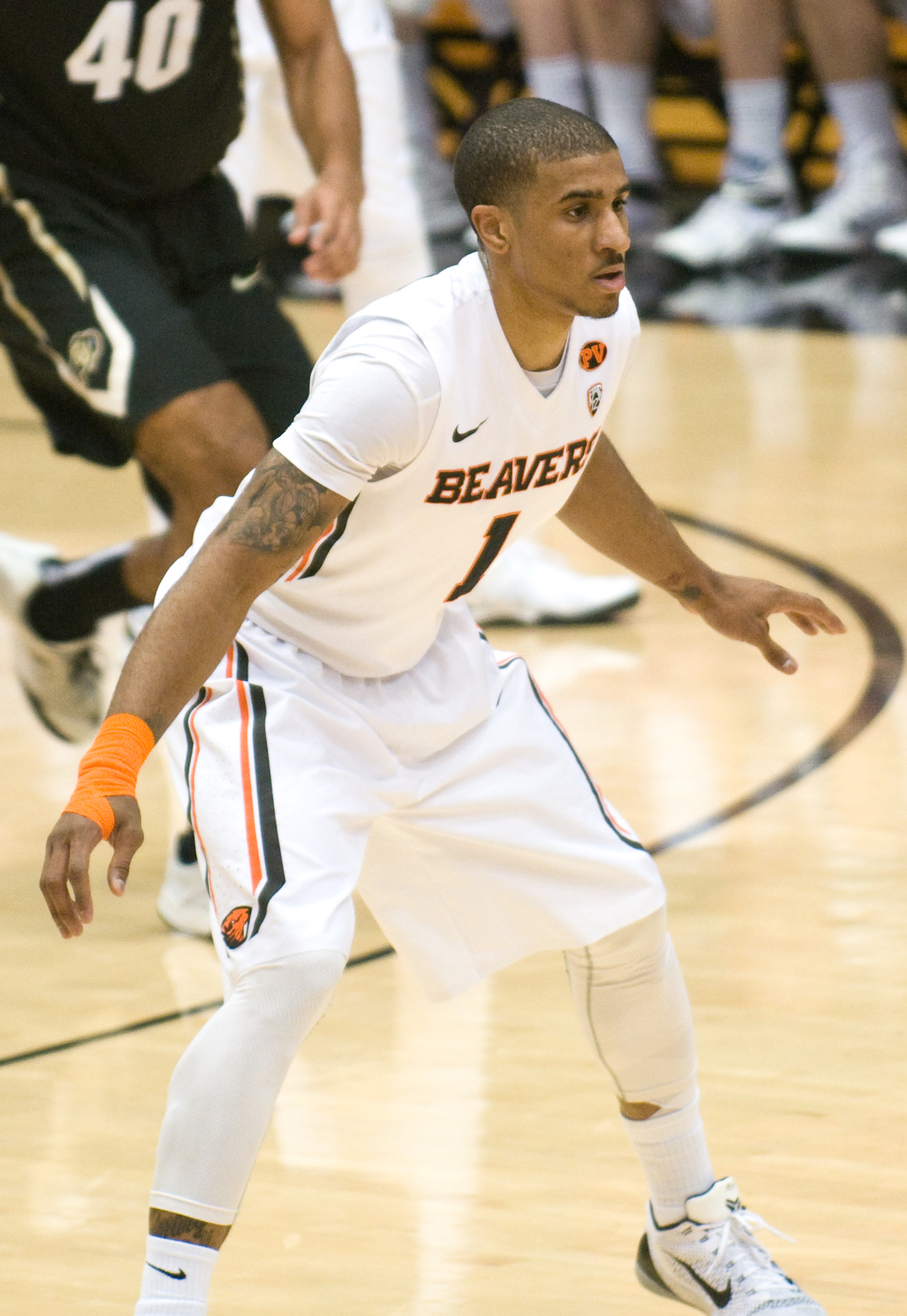
Defensive Player of the Year Gary Payton II of Oregon

Name	School	Pos.	Yr.	Ht., Wt.
Jordan Bell	Oregon	F	Fr.	6-9, 215
Rondae Hollis-Jefferson	Arizona	F	So.	6-7, 220
T. J. McConnell	Arizona	G	Sr.	6-1, 195
Gary Payton II	Oregon State	G	Jr.	6-3, 175
Delon Wright	Utah	G	Sr.	6-5, 190

=== USBWA ===
The United States Basketball Writers Association (USBWA) named the following from the Pac-12 to their All-District Teams:

District VIII

Player of the Year: Delon Wright, Utah

All-District Team

- Askia Booker, Colorado
- Delon Wright, Utah

District IX

All-District Team

- Norman Powell (UCLA)
- Stanley Johnson (Arizona)
- T. J. McConnell (Arizona)
- Tyrone Wallace (California)
- Joe Young (Oregon)
- Chasson Randle (Stanford)
- Gary Payton II (Oregon State)

=== NABC All-District 20 Team ===
National Association of Basketball Coaches (NABC) named the following to their All-District 20 team:

First Team

- Joe Young (Oregon)
- Delon Wright (Utah)
- Chasson Randle (Stanford)
- T. J. McConnell (Arizona)
- Stanley Johnson (Arizona)

Second Team

- Norman Powell (UCLA)
- Tyrone Wallace (California)
- Gary Payton II (Oregon State)
- Kevon Looney (UCLA)
- Askia Booker (Colorado)

== NBA draft ==
Round	Pick	Player	Position	Nationality	Team	School/club team
1	8	Stanley Johnson	SF	United States	Detroit Pistons	Arizona (Fr.)
1	20	Delon Wright	PG	United States	Toronto Raptors	Utah (Sr.)
1	23	Rondae Hollis-Jefferson	SF	United States	Portland Trail Blazers (traded to Brooklyn)	Arizona (So.)
1	30	Kevon Looney	PF	United States	Golden State Warriors	UCLA (Fr.)
2	34	Anthony Brown	SF	United States	Los Angeles Lakers	Stanford (Sr.)
2	43	Joe Young	PG	United States	Indiana Pacers	Oregon (Sr.)
2	46	Norman Powell	SG	United States	Milwaukee Bucks (traded to Toronto)	UCLA (Sr.)
