= 2014–15 Oregon State Beavers men's basketball team =

American college basketball season

2014–15 Oregon State Beavers men's basketball
- Conference: Pac-12 Conference
- Record: 17–14 (8–10 Pac-12)
- Head coach: Wayne Tinkle (1st season)
- Assistant coaches: Kerry Rupp; Gregg Gottlieb; Stephen Thompson
- Home arena: Gill Coliseum

2014–15 Pac-12 Conference men's basketball standings
	Conf.				Overall
Team	W		L	PCT	W		L	PCT
No. 5 Arizona †	16	–	2	.889	34	–	4	.895
No. 25 Oregon	13	–	5	.722	26	–	10	.722
No. 19 Utah	13	–	5	.722	26	–	9	.743
UCLA	11	–	7	.611	22	–	14	.611
Stanford	9	–	9	.500	24	–	13	.649
Arizona State	9	–	9	.500	18	–	16	.529
Oregon State	8	–	10	.444	17	–	14	.548
California	7	–	11	.389	18	–	15	.545
Colorado	7	–	11	.389	16	–	18	.471
Washington State	7	–	11	.389	13	–	18	.419
Washington	5	–	13	.278	16	–	15	.516
USC	3	–	15	.167	12	–	20	.375
† Pac-12 Tournament winner Rankings from AP poll

The 2014–15 Oregon State Beavers men's basketball team represented Oregon State University in the 2014–15 NCAA Division I men's basketball season. Led by first-year head coach Wayne Tinkle, the Beavers played their home games at Gill Coliseum in Corvallis, Oregon as members of the Pac-12 Conference. The Beavers went 17–14, 8–10 in Pac-12 play to finish 7th in the conference standings, and lost to Colorado in the first round of the Pac-12 tournament. Oregon St. was invited to play in the College Basketball Invitational for the 5th time, but declined.

== Previous season ==
The 2013–14 Oregon State Beavers finished the season with an overall record of 16–16, and 8–10 in the Pac-12. In the 2014 Pac-12 tournament, the team was defeated by Oregon, 88–74 in the first round. The Beavers were defeated by Radford, 96–92 in the first round of the 2014 College Basketball Invitational.

== Off season ==
On May 4, 2014, Oregon State fired Craig Robinson as head coach of the basketball program.

=== Departures ===
Name	Number	Pos.	Height	Weight	Year	Hometown	Reason for departure
Angus Brandt	12	C	6’10”	246	RS senior	Sydney, Australia	Graduated
Michael Moyer	2	G	6’3”	207	RS senior	Turner, Oregon	Graduated
Devon Collier	44	F	6’8”	216	Senior	Bronx, New York	Graduated
Daniel Jones	10	C	6’11”	219	Senior	Orland, California	Graduated
C.J. Mitchell	24	G	6’1”	182	Senior	Portland, Oregon	Graduated
Roberto Nelson	55	G	6’4”	198	Senior	Santa Barbara, California	Graduated
Eric Moreland	15	F	6'10"	218	RS junior	Missouri City, Texas	Declared for 2014 NBA draft
Challe Barton	4	G	6'3"	197	Junior	Gothenburg, Sweden	Elected to forgo remaining eligibility to play professionally overseas
Hallice Cook	3	G	6'3"	185	Freshman	Union City, New Jersey	Elected to transfer

=== 2014 recruiting class ===
College recruiting
Name	Hometown	School	Height	Weight	Commit date
Isaiah Manderson; C	Oldsmar, FL	Oldsmar Christian HS	6 ft 10 in (2.08 m)	250 lb (110 kg)	Jul 22, 2013
Isaiah Manderson; C	Recruit ratings: Scout: Rivals: 247Sports: ESPN:				
Chai Baker; SG	Malone, FL	Malone HS	6 ft 3 in (1.91 m)	180 lb (82 kg)	Sep 7, 2013
Chai Baker; SG	Recruit ratings: Scout: Rivals: 247Sports: ESPN:				
Cameron Oliver; PF	Sacramento, CA	Grant HS	6 ft 8 in (2.03 m)	220 lb (100 kg)	Apr 2, 2014
Cameron Oliver; PF	Recruit ratings: Scout: Rivals: 247Sports: ESPN:				
Overall recruit ranking:
Note: In many cases, Scout, Rivals, 247Sports, On3, and ESPN may conflict in their listings of height and weight.; In these cases, the average was taken. ESPN grades are on a 100-point scale.; Sources: "2014 Team Ranking". Rivals.

== Roster ==
2014–15 Oregon State Beavers men's basketball team
Players
Coaches

Pos.	#	Name	Height	Weight	Year	Hometown
G	1	Gary Payton II	6 ft 3 in (1.91 m)	175 lb (79 kg)	Jr	Las Vegas, Nevada
G	2	Chai Baker (injured) (I)	6 ft 3 in (1.91 m)	175 lb (79 kg)	Fr	Malone, Florida
G/F	4	Victor Robbins	6 ft 7 in (2.01 m)	197 lb (89 kg)	Jr	Compton, California
C	5	Cheikh N'diaye	7 ft 0 in (2.13 m)	230 lb (104 kg)	So	Dakar, Senegal
G	11	Malcolm Duvivier	6 ft 2 in (1.88 m)	205 lb (93 kg)	So	Toronto, Ontario
G	13	Langston Morris-Walker	6 ft 5 in (1.96 m)	216 lb (98 kg)	Jr	Berkeley, California
F	14	Daniel Gomis	6 ft 10 in (2.08 m)	223 lb (101 kg)	RS Jr	Thiès, Senegal
G	15	Tanner Sanders (W) (redshirt)	6 ft 4 in (1.93 m)	201 lb (91 kg)	Fr	Corvallis, Oregon
G	22	Alex Roth (W)	6 ft 4 in (1.93 m)	183 lb (83 kg)	RS Fr	Salem, Oregon
F	30	Olaf Schaftenaar	6 ft 10 in (2.08 m)	224 lb (102 kg)	Jr	Utrecht, Netherlands
G	31	AJ Hedgecock (W)	6 ft 0 in (1.83 m)	200 lb (91 kg)	So	Dayton, Oregon
F	32	Jarmal Reid	6 ft 7 in (2.01 m)	231 lb (105 kg)	Jr	Decatur, Georgia
C	40	Justin Stangel	6 ft 10 in (2.08 m)	220 lb (100 kg)	Jr	Milwaukie, Oregon
F	44	Bryan Boswell (W)	6 ft 8 in (2.03 m)	215 lb (98 kg)	Jr	Sisters, Oregon
G	51	Dylan Livesay (W)	6 ft 3 in (1.91 m)	195 lb (88 kg)	Fr	Wilsonville, Oregon
F	52	Matt Dahlen (W)	6 ft 6 in (1.98 m)	200 lb (91 kg)	RS Fr	Redmond, Oregon

Head coach

- Wayne Tinkle (Montana)

Assistant coach(es)

- Kerry Rupp
- Gregg Gottlieb
- Stephen Thompson

Legend

- (C) Team captain
- (S) Suspended
- (I) Ineligible
- (W) Walk-on
- Injured
- Current redshirt

Roster
Last update: 09/20/2014

== Schedule ==
Date time, TV	Opponent	Result	Record	Site (attendance) city, state
Exhibition
11/07/2014*; 7:00 pm	Western Oregon	L 47–57	–	Gill Coliseum (4,515); Corvallis, OR
Non-conference regular season
11/14/2014*; 7:00 pm, P12N	Rice	W 67–54	1–0	Gill Coliseum (4,759); Corvallis, OR
11/18/2014*; 7:00 pm, P12N	Corban	W 86–62	2–0	Gill Coliseum (3,608); Corvallis, OR
11/21/2014*; 6:00 pm, P12N	Oral Roberts; MGM Grand Main Event	W 55–42	3–0	Gill Coliseum (4,022); Corvallis, OR
11/24/2014*; 5:30 pm, ESPN3	vs. Oklahoma State; MGM Grand Main Event Semifinals	L 53–66	3–1	MGM Grand Garden Arena (1,507); Paradise, NV
11/26/2014*; 6:00 pm, ESPN3	vs. Auburn; MGM Grand Main Event Consolation	L 69–71	3–2	MGM Grand Garden Arena (1,712); Paradise, NV
12/03/2014*; 9:00 pm, P12N	Mississippi Valley State	W 74–50	4–2	Gill Coliseum (3,656); Corvallis, OR
12/06/2014*; 7:00 pm	at Portland	W 65–58 ^{OT}	5–2	Chiles Center (3,413); Portland, OR
12/13/2014*; 1:00 pm, P12N	Mississippi State	W 59–49	6–2	Gill Coliseum (4,211); Corvallis, OR
12/15/2014*; 7:00 pm, P12N	Grambling State	W 71–43	7–2	Gill Coliseum (3,553); Corvallis, OR
12/18/2014*; 7:00 pm, P12N	DePaul	W 90–59	8–2	Gill Coliseum (3,906); Corvallis, OR
12/21/2014*; 10:00 am	at Quinnipiac	L 52–60	8–3	TD Bank Sports Center (1,313); Hamden, CT
12/30/2014*; 6:30 pm, P12N	UC Santa Barbara	W 76–64	9–3	Gill Coliseum (4,803); Corvallis, OR
Pac-12 regular season
01/03/2015; 5:00 pm, ESPNU	at Oregon; Civil War	L 59–71	9–4 (0–1)	Matthew Knight Arena (7,314); Eugene, OR
01/08/2015; 6:00 pm, FS1	Arizona State	W 55–47	10–4 (1–1)	Gill Coliseum (4,603); Corvallis, OR
01/11/2015; 7:00 pm, FS1	No. 7 Arizona	W 58–56	11–4 (2–1)	Gill Coliseum (6,191); Corvallis, OR
01/15/2015; 6:00 pm, P12N	at Washington	L 43–56	11–5 (2–2)	Alaska Airlines Arena (6,663); Seattle, WA
01/17/2015; 6:00 pm, P12N	at Washington State	W 62–47	12–5 (3–2)	Beasley Coliseum (5,116); Pullman, WA
01/22/2015; 6:00 pm, P12N	UCLA	W 66–55	13–5 (4–2)	Gill Coliseum (6,024); Corvallis, OR
01/24/2015; 3:00 pm, P12N	USC	W 59–55	14–5 (5–2)	Gill Coliseum (8,877); Corvallis, OR
01/28/2015; 5:00 pm, P12N	at Arizona State	L 55–73	14–6 (5–3)	Wells Fargo Arena (5,436); Tempe, AZ
01/30/2015; 7:00 pm, P12N	at No. 6 Arizona	L 34–57	14–7 (5–4)	McKale Center (14,655); Tucson, AZ
02/05/2015; 7:00 pm, P12N	Washington State	W 55–50	15–7 (6–4)	Gill Coliseum (5,502); Corvallis, OR
02/08/2015; 1:30 pm, FS1	Washington	W 64–50	16–7 (7–4)	Gill Coliseum (9,114); Corvallis, OR
02/11/2015; 7:00 pm, P12N	at UCLA	L 59–75	16–8 (7–5)	Pauley Pavilion (6,346); Los Angeles, CA
02/14/2015; 2:00 pm, P12N	at USC	L 55–68	16–9 (7–6)	Galen Center (3,831); Los Angeles, CA
02/19/2015; 8:00 pm, P12N	No. 9 Utah	L 37–47	16–10 (7–7)	Gill Coliseum (6,124); Corvallis, OR
02/21/2015; 8:00 pm, P12N	Colorado	W 72–56	17–10 (8–7)	Gill Coliseum (7,117); Corvallis, OR
02/26/2015; 8:00 pm, P12N	at Stanford	L 48–75	17–11 (8–8)	Maples Pavilion (4,012); Stanford, CA
03/01/2015; 12:00 pm, P12N	at California	L 56–73	17–12 (8–9)	Haas Pavilion (9,893); Berkeley, CA
03/04/2015; 8:00 pm, ESPNU	Oregon; Civil War	L 62–65	17–13 (8–10)	Gill Coliseum (9,339); Corvallis, OR
Pac-12 tournament
03/11/2015; 6:00 pm, P12N	vs. Colorado; First round	L 71–78	17–14	MGM Grand Garden Arena (9,875); Paradise, NV
*Non-conference game. ^{#}Rankings from AP Poll. (#) Tournament seedings in parentheses. All times are in Pacific Time.
