= 2014–15 Washington State Cougars men's basketball team =

American college basketball season

2014–15 Washington State Cougars men's basketball
- Conference: Pac-12 Conference
- Record: 13–18 (7–11 Pac-12)
- Head coach: Ernie Kent (1st season)
- Assistant coaches: Greg Graham; Silvey Dominguez; Curtis Allen
- Home arena: Beasley Coliseum

2014–15 Pac-12 Conference men's basketball standings
	Conf.				Overall
Team	W		L	PCT	W		L	PCT
No. 5 Arizona †	16	–	2	.889	34	–	4	.895
No. 25 Oregon	13	–	5	.722	26	–	10	.722
No. 19 Utah	13	–	5	.722	26	–	9	.743
UCLA	11	–	7	.611	22	–	14	.611
Stanford	9	–	9	.500	24	–	13	.649
Arizona State	9	–	9	.500	18	–	16	.529
Oregon State	8	–	10	.444	17	–	14	.548
California	7	–	11	.389	18	–	15	.545
Colorado	7	–	11	.389	16	–	18	.471
Washington State	7	–	11	.389	13	–	18	.419
Washington	5	–	13	.278	16	–	15	.516
USC	3	–	15	.167	12	–	20	.375
† Pac-12 Tournament winner Rankings from AP poll

The 2014–15 Washington State Cougars men's basketball team represented Washington State University during the 2014–15 NCAA Division I men's basketball season. This was Ernie Kent's first year as head coach at Washington State. The Cougars played their games at the Beasley Coliseum as members of the Pac-12 Conference. They finished the season 13–18, 7–11 in Pac-12 play to finish in a three-way tie for eighth place. They lost in the first round of the Pac-12 tournament to California.

== Previous season ==
The 2014–15 Cougars finished the season with an overall record of 10–21, and 3–15 in the Pac-12 to finish in eleventh place. They lost in the first round of the Pac-12 tournament to Stanford. On March 18, 2014, it was announced that Ken Bone had been fired after five seasons as head coach.

== Off-season ==
=== Departures ===
Name	Number	Pos.	Height	Weight	Year	Hometown	Reason for departure
Will DiIorio	5	G	6'5"	190	Senior	Bainridge Island, WA	Graduated
James Hunter	13	F	6'10"	265	RS junior	Sydney, Australia	Transferred to South Dakota
Royce Woolridge	22	G	6'3"	175	RS junior	Phoenix, AZ	Graduate transferred to Grand Canyon
D.J. Shelton	23	F	6'10"	250	RS senior	Rialto, CA	Graduated

=== Incoming transfers ===
Name	Number	Pos.	Height	Weight	Year	Hometown	Previous school
Aaron Cheatum	20	F	6'7"	240	Junior	Moreno Valley, CA	Junior college transfer from East Los Angeles College
Valentine Izundu	45	C	6'10"	215	Junior	Houston, TX	Transferred from Houston. Under NCAA transfer rules, Izundu had to redshirt for the 2014–15 season. Had two years of remaining eligibility.

=== 2014 recruiting class ===
College recruiting
Name	Hometown	School	Height	Weight	Commit date
Jackie Davis; PG	Palos Verdes, CA	Rolling Hills Preparatory School	6 ft 2 in (1.88 m)	185 lb (84 kg)	Apr 26, 2014
Jackie Davis; PG	Recruit ratings: Scout: Rivals: 247Sports: ESPN:				
Nyaires Redding; PG	Solon, OH	Westwind Preparatory Academy	6 ft 2 in (1.88 m)	178 lb (81 kg)	May 12, 2014
Nyaires Redding; PG	Recruit ratings: Scout: Rivals: 247Sports: ESPN:				
Trevor Dunbar; PG	San Francisco, CA	St. Ignatius College Preparatory	5 ft 10 in (1.78 m)	160 lb (73 kg)	Jun 1, 2014
Trevor Dunbar; PG	Recruit ratings: Scout: Rivals: 247Sports: ESPN:				
Overall recruit ranking:
Note: In many cases, Scout, Rivals, 247Sports, On3, and ESPN may conflict in their listings of height and weight.; In these cases, the average was taken. ESPN grades are on a 100-point scale.; Sources: "2014 Washington State Cougars Basketball Commits". ESPN.

College recruiting (2015)
Name	Hometown	School	Height	Weight	Commit date
Jeff Pollard; PF	Bountiful, UT	Bountiful HS	6 ft 8 in (2.03 m)	220 lb (100 kg)	Jun 25, 2014
Jeff Pollard; PF	Recruit ratings: Scout: Rivals: 247Sports: ESPN:				
Robert Franks; PF	Vancouver, WA	Evergreen HS	6 ft 8 in (2.03 m)	200 lb (91 kg)	Sep 29, 2014
Robert Franks; PF	Recruit ratings: Scout: Rivals: 247Sports: ESPN:				
Overall recruit ranking:
Note: In many cases, Scout, Rivals, 247Sports, On3, and ESPN may conflict in their listings of height and weight.; In these cases, the average was taken. ESPN grades are on a 100-point scale.; Sources: "2015 Washington St. Basketball Commitment List". Rivals.; "2015 Washington State Cougars Basketball Commits". ESPN.; "2015 Team Ranking". Rivals.

== Roster ==
2014–15 Washington State Cougars men's basketball team
Players
Coaches

Pos.	#	Name	Height	Weight	Year	Previous school	Hometown
G	0	Ike Iroegbu	6 ft 2 in (1.88 m)	190 lb (86 kg)	So	Oak Hill Acad.	Elk Grove, CA
G	1	Jackie Davis	6 ft 3 in (1.91 m)	195 lb (88 kg)	Fr	Rolling Hills Prep School	Long Beach, CA
G	3	Ny Redding	6 ft 2 in (1.88 m)	180 lb (82 kg)	Fr	Westwind Prep	Solon, OH
C	4	Jordan Railey	7 ft 0 in (2.13 m)	245 lb (111 kg)	RS Sr	Iowa State	Beaverton, OR
G	10	Dexter Kernich-Drew	6 ft 7 in (2.01 m)	190 lb (86 kg)	RS Sr	Caulfield Grammar	Melbourne, Australia
G	11	Trevor Dunbar	5 ft 10 in (1.78 m)	170 lb (77 kg)	Fr	St. Ignatius College Prep	San Francisco, CA
F	15	Junior Longrus	6 ft 7 in (2.01 m)	240 lb (109 kg)	Jr	Bishop O'Dowd HS	Oakland, CA
F	20	Aaron Cheatum	6 ft 7 in (2.01 m)	240 lb (109 kg)	Jr	East Los Angeles College	Moreno Valley, CA
G	21	Dominic Ballard (W)	6 ft 4 in (1.93 m)	199 lb (90 kg)	RS Jr	Bothell HS	Seattle, WA
F	24	Josh Hawkinson	6 ft 10 in (2.08 m)	245 lb (111 kg)	So	East Shorewood HS	Shoreline, WA
G	25	DaVonté Lacy	6 ft 4 in (1.93 m)	210 lb (95 kg)	Sr	Curtis Sr. HS	Tacoma, WA
G	30	Marcus Graham (W)	6 ft 3 in (1.91 m)	180 lb (82 kg)	Jr	Lincoln Land CC	Boise, ID
F	32	Que Johnson	6 ft 5 in (1.96 m)	205 lb (93 kg)	RS So	Westwind Prep	Pontiac, MI
F	33	Brett Boese	6 ft 7 in (2.01 m)	230 lb (104 kg)	Jr	Shadle Park HS	Spokane, WA
C	45	Valentine Izundu (redshirt)	6 ft 10 in (2.08 m)	215 lb (98 kg)	Jr	Houston	Houston, TX

Head coach

- Ernie Kent (Oregon)

Assistant coach(es)

- Greg Graham (Oregon)
- Silvey Dominguez (New Mexico)
- Curtis Allen (Washington)

Legend

- (C) Team captain
- (S) Suspended
- (I) Ineligible
- (W) Walk-on
- Injured
- Current redshirt

Roster

== Schedule ==
Date time, TV	Opponent	Result	Record	Site (attendance) city, state
Exhibition
11/07/2014*; 7:00 pm	Azusa Pacific	W 88–74		Beasley Coliseum (2,536); Pullman, WA
Non-conference regular season
11/14/2014*; 7:00 pm	at UTEP	L 52–65	0–1	Don Haskins Center (10,419); El Paso, TX
11/17/2014*; 5:00 pm	at TCU	L 54–81	0–2	Wilkerson-Greines Activity Center (3,509); Fort Worth, TX
11/21/2014*; 6:00 pm, P12N	Idaho State	W 80–68	1–2	Beasley Coliseum (2,138); Pullman, WA
11/27/2014*; 9:00 pm, CBSSN	vs. UC Santa Barbara; Great Alaska Shootout quarterfinals	L 43–71	1–3	Alaska Airlines Center (2,588); Anchorage, AK
11/28/2014*; 3:00 pm	vs. Rice; Great Alaska Shootout consolation round	W 76–64	2–3	Alaska Airlines Center (2,554); Anchorage, AK
11/29/2014*; 3:00 pm	vs. Missouri State; Great Alaska Shootout 5th place game	W 89–84 ^{OT}	3–3	Alaska Airlines Center (2,543); Anchorage, AK
12/03/2014*; 7:00 pm, P12N	Idaho; Battle of the Palouse	L 71–77	3–4	Beasley Coliseum (2,723); Pullman, WA
12/06/2014*; 12:00 pm, P12N	UTSA	W 91–71	4–4	Beasley Coliseum (1,915); Pullman, WA
12/10/2013*; 8:00 pm, ESPNU	vs. No. 9 Gonzaga; Rivalry	L 66–81	4–5	Spokane Arena (11,521); Spokane, WA
12/13/2014*; 7:00 pm	at Santa Clara	L 67–76	4–6	Leavey Center (1,172); Santa Clara, CA
12/21/2014*; 4:00 pm, P12N	San Jose State	W 82–53	5–6	Beasley Coliseum (1,604); Pullman, WA
12/28/2014*; 3:00 pm, P12N	UC Davis	W 90–83	6–6	Beasley Coliseum (1,401); Pullman, WA
Pac-12 regular season
01/02/2015; 12:00 pm, P12N	at Stanford	L 56–71	6–7 (0–1)	Maples Pavilion (4,373); Stanford, CA
01/04/2015; 3:00 pm, P12N	at California	W 69–66	7–7 (1–1)	Haas Pavilion (7,618); Stanford, CA
01/10/2015; 12:00 pm, P12N	at Washington; Rivalry	W 80–77	8–7 (2–1)	Alaska Airlines Arena (7,595); Seattle, WA
01/15/2015; 8:00 pm, P12N	Oregon	W 108–99 ^{OT}	9–7 (3–1)	Beasley Coliseum (3,584); Pullman, WA
01/17/2015; 6:00 pm, P12N	Oregon State	L 47–62	9–8 (3–2)	Beasley Coliseum (5,116); Pullman, WA
01/21/2015; 6:00 pm, P12N	at No. 12 Utah	L 64–86	9–9 (3–3)	Jon M. Huntsman Center (12,691); Salt Lake City, UT
01/24/2015; 5:00 pm, P12N	at Colorado	L 58–90	9–10 (3–4)	Coors Events Center (9,571); Boulder, CO
01/29/2015; 8:00 pm, P12N	California	L 67–76	9–11 (3–5)	Beasley Coliseum (2,957); Pullman, WA
01/31/2015; 5:00 pm, P12N	Stanford	W 89–88	10–11 (4–5)	Beasley Coliseum (3,073); Pullman, WA
02/05/2015; 6:00 pm, P12N	at Oregon State	L 50–55	10–12 (4–6)	Gill Coliseum (5,502); Corvallis, OR
02/08/2015; 4:00 pm, P12N	at Oregon	L 72–95	10–13 (4–7)	Matthew Knight Arena (7,121); Eugene, OR
02/13/2015; 8:00 pm, P12N	Arizona State	W 74–71	11–13 (5–7)	Beasley Coliseum (3,129); Pullman, WA
02/15/2015; 3:30 pm, FS1	No. 7 Arizona	L 59–86	11–14 (5–8)	Beasley Coliseum (5,331); Pullman, WA
02/22/2015; 5:30 pm, ESPNU	Washington; Rivalry	L 84–87	11–15 (5–9)	Beasley Coliseum (5,567); Pullman, WA
02/25/2015; 7:00 pm, P12N	at USC	W 70–66	12–15 (6–9)	Galen Center (2,735); Los Angeles, CA
03/01/2015; 6:30 pm, FS1	at UCLA	L 67–72	12–16 (6–10)	Pauley Pavilion (9,082); Los Angeles, CA
03/05/2015; 8:00 pm, ESPNU	No. 13 Utah	L 59–67	12–17 (6–11)	Beasley Coliseum (2,690); Pullman, WA
03/07/2015; 3:30 pm, P12N	Colorado	W 96–91 ^{OT}	13–17 (7–11)	Beasley Coliseum (3,434); Pullman, WA
Pac-12 Tournament
03/11/2015; 12:00 pm, P12N	vs. California; First round	L 59–84	13–18	MGM Grand Garden Arena (9,024); Paradise, NV
*Non-conference game. ^{#}Rankings from AP Poll. (#) Tournament seedings in parentheses. All times are in Pacific Time.
