= 2014–15 Oregon Ducks men's basketball team =

American college basketball season

2014–15 Oregon Ducks men's basketball

NCAA tournament, Round of 32
- Conference: Pac-12 Conference

Ranking
- Coaches: No. 25
- Record: 26–10 (13–5 Pac-12)
- Head coach: Dana Altman (5th season)
- Assistant coaches: Kevin McKenna; Tony Stubblefield; Mike Mennenga
- Home arena: Matthew Knight Arena

2014–15 Pac-12 Conference men's basketball standings
	Conf.				Overall
Team	W		L	PCT	W		L	PCT
No. 5 Arizona †	16	–	2	.889	34	–	4	.895
No. 25 Oregon	13	–	5	.722	26	–	10	.722
No. 19 Utah	13	–	5	.722	26	–	9	.743
UCLA	11	–	7	.611	22	–	14	.611
Stanford	9	–	9	.500	24	–	13	.649
Arizona State	9	–	9	.500	18	–	16	.529
Oregon State	8	–	10	.444	17	–	14	.548
California	7	–	11	.389	18	–	15	.545
Colorado	7	–	11	.389	16	–	18	.471
Washington State	7	–	11	.389	13	–	18	.419
Washington	5	–	13	.278	16	–	15	.516
USC	3	–	15	.167	12	–	20	.375
† Pac-12 Tournament winner Rankings from AP poll

The 2014–15 Oregon Ducks men's basketball team represented the University of Oregon during the 2014–15 NCAA Division I men's basketball season. The Ducks were led by their fifth year head coach Dana Altman. They played their home games at Matthew Knight Arena and were members of the Pac-12 Conference. They finished the season 26–10, 13–5 in Pac-12 play to finish in a tie for second place. They advanced to the championship game of the Pac-12 tournament where they lost to Arizona. They received an at-large bid to the NCAA tournament where they defeated Oklahoma State in the second round before losing in the third round to Wisconsin.

== Previous season ==
The 2013–14 Oregon Ducks finished the season with a record of 24–10 after advancing to the 2014 NCAA Division I men's basketball tournament. The team went 10–8 in the Pac-12 regular season. In the 2014 Pac-12 tournament, the team defeated Oregon State 88–74, before losing to UCLA, 82–63 in the quarterfinals. The Ducks were a #7-seed in the West Region of the NCAA tournament. Oregon won its first tournament game, defeating #10-seed BYU 87–68. Oregon eventually lost to #2-seed Wisconsin 85–77, in the Round of 32.

== Off-season ==
=== Departures ===
Name	Number	Pos.	Height	Weight	Year	Hometown	Notes
Richard Amardi	13	F	6’8”	224	RS Senior	Toronto, ON	Graduated.
Jason Calliste	12	G	6’1”	171	RS Senior	Scarborough, ON	Graduated.
Mike Moser	0	F	6’8”	211	RS Senior	Portland, OR	Graduated.
Waverly Austin	20	C	6’11”	257	Senior	Fredericksburg, VA	Graduated.
Johnathan Loyd	10	G	5’8”	163	Senior	Las Vegas, NV	Graduated.
Nicholas Lucenti	4	G	6’2”	205	Senior	Los Angeles, CA	Graduated.
Brian Crow	35	F	6’6”	220	Senior	Novato, CA	Graduated.
Dominic Artis	1	G	6’1”	186	Junior	Oakland, CA	Dismissed from the team due to sexual assault allegations.
Damyean Dotson	21	G	6’5”	209	Junior	Houston, TX	Dismissed from the team due to sexual assault allegations.
Ben Carter	32	F	6'8"	220	Sophomore	Las Vegas, NV	Elected to transfer to UNLV.
A.J. Lapray	24	G	6'5"	187	Freshman	Salem, OR	Elected to transfer to Pepperdine.

=== Incoming transfers ===
Name	Number	Pos.	Height	Weight	Year	Hometown	Notes
Dwayne Benjamin	0	SF	6’6”	190	Junior	Lafayette, Louisiana	Junior College transfer from San Jacinto College.
Michael Chandler	25	C	6’10”	245	Junior	Indianapolis, Indiana	Junior College transfer from Northwest Florida State College.

=== 2014 recruiting class ===
College recruiting
Name	Hometown	School	Height	Weight	Commit date
Casey Benson; PG	Tempe, AZ	Corona Del Sol High School	6 ft 3 in (1.91 m)	185 lb (84 kg)	Jul 7, 2013
Casey Benson; PG	Recruit ratings: Scout: Rivals: 247Sports: ESPN:				
Ray Kasongo; PF	Toronto, ON	Phase One Academy	6 ft 9 in (2.06 m)	235 lb (107 kg)	Oct 26, 2013
Ray Kasongo; PF	Recruit ratings: Scout: Rivals: 247Sports: ESPN:				
Ahmaad Rorie; PG	Tacoma, WA	Lincoln High School	6 ft 0 in (1.83 m)	175 lb (79 kg)	May 22, 2014
Ahmaad Rorie; PG	Recruit ratings: Scout: Rivals: 247Sports: ESPN:				
Overall recruit ranking:
Note: In many cases, Scout, Rivals, 247Sports, On3, and ESPN may conflict in their listings of height and weight.; In these cases, the average was taken. ESPN grades are on a 100-point scale.; Sources: "2014 Oregon Basketball Commits". ESPN.

==== 2015 recruiting class ====
College recruiting (2015)
Name	Hometown	School	Height	Weight	Commit date
Kendall Small #16 PG	Anaheim, CA	Mayfair HS	6 ft 0 in (1.83 m)	170 lb (77 kg)	Apr 29, 2014
Kendall Small #16 PG	Recruit ratings: Scout: Rivals: 247Sports: ESPN:				
Trevor Manuel #29 PF	Lansing, MI	Everett HS	6 ft 9 in (2.06 m)	200 lb (91 kg)	Sep 11, 2014
Trevor Manuel #29 PF	Recruit ratings: Scout: Rivals: 247Sports: ESPN:				
Tyler Dorsey #10 SG	Pasadena, CA	Maranatha HS	6 ft 4 in (1.93 m)	180 lb (82 kg)	Feb 2, 2015
Tyler Dorsey #10 SG	Recruit ratings: Scout: Rivals: 247Sports: ESPN:				
Overall recruit ranking:
Note: In many cases, Scout, Rivals, 247Sports, On3, and ESPN may conflict in their listings of height and weight.; In these cases, the average was taken. ESPN grades are on a 100-point scale.; Sources: "2015 Player Commits". ESPN.; "2015 Team Ranking". Rivals.

== Roster ==
2014–15 Oregon Ducks men's basketball team
Players
Coaches

Pos.	#	Name	Height	Weight	Year	Hometown
F	0	Dwayne Benjamin	6 ft 7 in (2.01 m)	210 lb (95 kg)	Jr	Lafayette, Louisiana
F	1	Jordan Bell	6 ft 9 in (2.06 m)	215 lb (98 kg)	Fr	Long Beach, California
G	2	Casey Benson	6 ft 3 in (1.91 m)	185 lb (84 kg)	Fr	Tempe, Arizona
G	3	Joe Young	6 ft 2 in (1.88 m)	180 lb (82 kg)	RS Sr	Houston, Texas
G	4	Max Heller (W)	5 ft 10 in (1.78 m)	170 lb (77 kg)	RS Jr	Del Mar, California
G	10	Charlie Noebel (W)	6 ft 2 in (1.88 m)	178 lb (81 kg)	So	Irvine, California
G	11	Theo Friedman (W)	6 ft 1 in (1.85 m)	175 lb (79 kg)	So	Portland, Oregon
G	14	Ahmaad Rorie	6 ft 1 in (1.85 m)	175 lb (79 kg)	Fr	Tacoma, Washington
G	15	Jalil Abdul-Bassit	6 ft 4 in (1.93 m)	197 lb (89 kg)	Sr	Anchorage, Alaska
F	23	Elgin Cook	6 ft 6 in (1.98 m)	205 lb (93 kg)	RS Jr	Milwaukee, Wisconsin
F	24	Dillon Brooks	6 ft 6 in (1.98 m)	225 lb (102 kg)	Fr	Mississauga, Ontario
C	25	Michael Chandler	6 ft 10 in (2.08 m)	240 lb (109 kg)	Jr	Indianapolis, Indiana
F	32	Tim Jensen (W)	6 ft 6 in (1.98 m)	225 lb (102 kg)	RS Sr	Manistee, Michigan
G	33	Hayden Coppedge (W)	6 ft 4 in (1.93 m)	180 lb (82 kg)	Fr	West Linn, Oregon
G	35	Anthony Piganelli (W)	6 ft 4 in (1.93 m)	195 lb (88 kg)	Sr	Oakland, California
F	41	Roman Sorkin	6 ft 10 in (2.08 m)	225 lb (102 kg)	Fr	Ashdod, Israel

Head coach

- Dana Altman (Eastern New Mexico)

Assistant coach(es)

- Kevin McKenna (Creighton)
- Tony Stubblefield (Omaha)
- Mike Mennenga (Morehead State)

Legend

- (C) Team captain
- (S) Suspended
- (I) Ineligible
- (W) Walk-on
- Injured
- Current redshirt

Roster
Last update: 01/24/2015

=== Roster notes ===
- On January 6, 2015, Oregon added Freshman forward Roman Sorkin from the Israeli Junior National Team. He is eligible to play immediately.

== Schedule ==
Date time, TV	Rank^{#}	Opponent^{#}	Result	Record	Site (attendance) city, state
Exhibition
11/04/2014*; 7:00 pm, P12N		Northwest Christian	W 101–69	–	Matthew Knight Arena (5,775); Eugene, OR
11/09/2014*; 6:00 pm, –		Western Oregon	W 104–55	–	Matthew Knight Arena (5,344); Eugene, OR
Non-conference regular season
11/14/2014*; 8:00 pm, P12N		Coppin State	W 107–65	1–0	Matthew Knight Arena (5,467); Eugene, OR
11/17/2014*; 8:00 pm, ESPNU		Detroit; Legends Classic Regional Round	W 83–66	2–0	Matthew Knight Arena (5,051); Eugene, OR
11/21/2014*; 4:00 pm, P12N		Toledo; Legends Classic Regional Round	W 78–68	3–0	Matthew Knight Arena (5,790); Eugene, OR
11/24/2014*; 6:00 pm, ESPN3		vs. No. 19 Michigan; Legends Classic Semifinals	L 63–70	3–1	Barclays Center (8,465); Brooklyn, NY
11/25/2014*; 4:30 pm, ESPNU		vs. No. 14 VCU; Legends Classic Consolation	L 63–77	3–2	Barclays Center (8,093); Brooklyn, NY
11/30/2014*; 5:00 pm, P12N		Portland State	W 81–59	4–2	Matthew Knight Arena (5,040); Eugene, OR
12/03/2014*; 7:00 pm, P12N		Concordia (Oregon)	W 94–63	5–2	Matthew Knight Arena (4,909); Eugene, OR
12/07/2014*; 1:00 pm, FS1		Ole Miss	L 73–79	5–3	Matthew Knight Arena (6,256); Eugene, OR
12/13/2014*; 4:00 PM, BTN		vs. Illinois	W 77–70	6–3	United Center (13,759); Chicago, IL
12/17/2014*; 8:00 PM, P12N		Cal State Northridge	W 79–56	7–3	Matthew Knight Arena (4,914); Eugene, OR
12/20/2014*; 12:00 PM, P12N		Delaware State	W 83–70	8–3	Matthew Knight Arena (5,530); Eugene, OR
12/22/2014*; 6:00 PM, P12N		UC Santa Barbara	W 82–78 ^{OT}	9–3	Matthew Knight Arena (5,396); Eugene, OR
12/29/2014*; 8:00 PM, P12N		UC Irvine	W 69–67 ^{OT}	10–3	Matthew Knight Arena (5,421); Eugene, OR
Pac-12 regular season
01/03/2015; 5:00 pm, ESPNU		Oregon State; Civil War	W 71–59	11–3 (1–0)	Matthew Knight Arena (7,314); Eugene, OR
01/08/2015; 7:30 pm, P12N		No. 7 Arizona	L 62–80	11–4 (1–1)	Matthew Knight Arena (8,829); Eugene, OR
01/10/2015; 2:00 pm, P12N		Arizona State	W 59–56	12–4 (2–1)	Matthew Knight Arena (5,637); Eugene, OR
01/15/2015; 8:00 pm, P12N		at Washington State	L 99–108 ^{OT}	12–5 (2–2)	Beasley Coliseum (3,584); Pullman, WA
01/18/2015; 5:30 pm, ESPNU		at Washington	L 77–85	12–6 (2–3)	Alaska Airlines Arena (6,912); Seattle, WA
01/22/2015; 8:00 pm, P12N		USC	W 75–67	13–6 (3–3)	Matthew Knight Arena (5,652); Eugene, OR
01/24/2015; 1:00 pm, CBS		UCLA	W 82–64	14–6 (4–3)	Matthew Knight Arena (7,301); Eugene, OR
01/28/2015; 7:00 pm, P12N		at No. 6 Arizona	L 56–90	14–7 (4–4)	McKale Center (14,655); Tucson, AZ
01/30/2015; 5:00 pm, P12N		at Arizona State	W 68–67 ^{OT}	15–7 (5–4)	Wells Fargo Arena (6,127); Tempe, AZ
02/04/2015; 6:00 pm, ESPN2		Washington	W 78–74	16–7 (6–4)	Matthew Knight Arena (5,866); Eugene, OR
02/08/2015; 4:00 pm, P12N		Washington State	W 95–72	17–7 (7–4)	Matthew Knight Arena (7,121); Eugene, OR
02/11/2015; 6:00 pm, ESPN2		at USC	W 80–75	18–7 (8–4)	Galen Center (2,836); Los Angeles, CA
02/14/2015; 12:00 pm, FOX		at UCLA	L 63–72	18–8 (8–5)	Pauley Pavilion (10,006); Los Angeles, CA
02/18/2015; 8:00 pm, ESPNU		Colorado	W 73–60	19–8 (9–5)	Matthew Knight Arena (5,734); Eugene, OR
02/22/2015; 12:00 pm, FS1		No. 9 Utah	W 69–58	20–8 (10–5)	Matthew Knight Arena (10,725); Eugene, OR
02/25/2015; 8:00 pm, ESPNU		at California	W 80–69	21–8 (11–5)	Haas Pavilion (8,566); Berkeley, CA
03/01/2015; 4:00 pm, FS1		at Stanford	W 73–70	22–8 (12–5)	Maples Pavilion (7,233); Stanford, CA
03/04/2015; 8:00 pm, ESPNU		at Oregon State; Civil War	W 65–62	23–8 (13–5)	Gill Coliseum (9,339); Corvallis, OR
Pac-12 tournament
03/12/2015; 6:00 pm, P12N	(2)	vs. (10) Colorado; Quarterfinals	W 93–85	24–8	MGM Grand Garden Arena (12,916); Paradise, NV
03/13/2015; 8:30 pm, ESPN	(2)	vs. (3) No. 17 Utah; Semifinals	W 67–64	25–8	MGM Grand Garden Arena (12,916); Paradise, NV
03/14/2015; 8:00 pm, ESPN	(2)	vs. (1) No. 5 Arizona; Championship	L 52–80	25–9	MGM Grand Garden Arena (12,916); Paradise, NV
NCAA tournament
03/20/2015*; 3:50 pm, TBS	(8 W)	vs. (9 W) Oklahoma State; Second round	W 79–73	26–9	CenturyLink Center (17,534); Omaha, NE
03/22/2015*; 4:45 pm, truTV	(8 W)	vs. (1 W) No. 3 Wisconsin; Third round	L 65–72	26–10	CenturyLink Center (17,563); Omaha, NE
*Non-conference game. ^{#}Rankings from AP Poll. (#) Tournament seedings in parentheses. All times are in Pacific Time. (#) during NCAA Tournament is seed with Region W=West.

== Ranking movement ==
Legend: ██ Increase in ranking. ██ Decrease in ranking.
Poll	Pre	Wk 2	Wk 3	Wk 4	Wk 5	Wk 6	Wk 7	Wk 8	Wk 9	Wk 10	Wk 11	Wk 12	Wk 13	Wk 14	Wk 15	Wk 16	Wk 17	Wk 18	Post	Final
AP	NR	NR	NR	NR	NR	NR	NR	NR	NR	RV	NR	NR	NR	NR	NR	RV	RV	RV	RV	N/A
Coaches	RV	RV	RV	NR	NR	NR	NR	NR	RV	NR	NR	NR	NR	NR	NR	RV	RV	RV	25	25
