= Askia Booker =

American basketball player (born 1993)

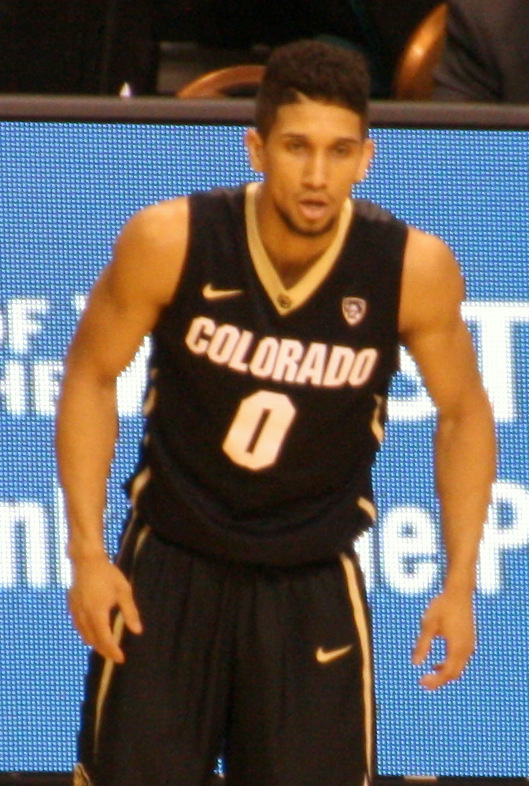
- Booker with the Colorado Buffaloes in 2014

Personal information
- Born: August 31, 1993 (age 33) Inglewood, California, U.S.
- Listed height: 6 ft 1 in (1.85 m)
- Listed weight: 170 lb (77 kg)

Career information
- High school: Price (Los Angeles, California)
- College: Colorado (2011–2015)
- NBA draft: 2015: undrafted
- Playing career: 2015–2024
- Position: Point guard

Career history
- 2015: Arkadikos
- 2015–2017: Bakersfield Jam / Northern Arizona Suns
- 2017–2018: Delaware 87ers
- 2018: Real Betis Energía Plus
- 2018–2020: UCAM Murcia
- 2020–2023: Shenzhen Leopards
- 2024: Beijing Ducks
- 2024: Shenzhen Leopards

Career highlights
- Second-team All-Pac-12 (2015)

Askia Toussaint Booker (born August 31, 1993) is an American former professional basketball player. He played college basketball for the Colorado Buffaloes as a point guard. In his senior year in 2014–15, he earned second-team all-conference honors in the Pac-12.

== High school career ==
Booker attended Price High School. As a junior, he averaged 13 points, 7 rebounds and 5 assists to lead Price to the Division IV championship. He was ranked 30th in the nation at his position by ESPN. Booker committed to the Colorado Buffaloes to play for Tad Boyle on October 29, 2010.

== College career ==
As a freshman, Booker helped lead Colorado to the NCAA Tournament for the first time since the 2002–03 season. He averaged 9.1 points, 2.7 rebounds, and 1.4 assists in 21.5 minutes per game.

As a sophomore, Booker was one of two players to start all 33 games, along with Spencer Dinwiddie. He averaged 12.4 points, 2.2 assists, and 1.2 steals per game.

As a junior, he hit a buzzer beater against KU. He was named a Pac-12 honorable mention.

As a senior in 2014–15, Booker was voted second-team All-Pac-12. Although Colorado accepted an invitation to play in the College Basketball Invitational, Booker decided to skip the postseason tournament.

== Professional career ==
After going undrafted in the 2015 NBA draft, Booker joined the Philadelphia 76ers for the 2015 NBA Summer League. On August 13, 2015, he signed with Arkadikos for the 2015–16 Greek Basket League season. However, he was released by Arkadikos in mid-October after appearing in just two games. On October 31, 2015, he was selected by the Maine Red Claws with the 10th overall pick in the 2015 NBA Development League Draft, only to be traded to the Bakersfield Jam in a three-team draft night deal. In 47 games for the Jam in 2015–16, he averaged 12.8 points, 3.1 rebounds and 3.5 assists per game.

In July 2016, Booker joined the Phoenix Suns for the 2016 NBA Summer League. On October 31, 2016, he was re-acquired by the now Northern Arizona Suns. In the team's season opener on November 12, 2016, Booker scored 15 points in a 122–106 win over the Iowa Energy.

On December 28, 2017, Booker was traded alongside a fourth round draft pick to the Delaware 87ers for Jerrelle Benimon.

On February 20, 2018, Booker signed a contract with Real Betis Energía Plus of the Spanish Liga ACB.

On July 24, 2018, Booker signed a one-year deal with UCAM Murcia of the Liga ACB.

On September 30, 2020, Booker signed with the Shenzhen Aviators of the Chinese Basketball Association.

== Career statistics ==
=== Professional ===
Legend
GP	Games played	GS	Games started	MPG	Minutes per game
FG%	Field goal percentage	3P%	3-point field goal percentage	FT%	Free throw percentage
RPG	Rebounds per game	APG	Assists per game	SPG	Steals per game
BPG	Blocks per game	PPG	Points per game	**Bold**	Career high

==== Europe ====
Year	Team	GP	GS	MPG	FG%	3P%	FT%	RPG	APG	SPG	BPG	PPG
2015–16	(Greece) Arkadikos B.C.	2	2	25.6	.143	.091	1.000	5.0	4.0	0.0	0.0	5.0
2017–18	(Spain) Real Betis Energía Plus	14	10	24.2	.479	.255	.875	2.6	2.7	0.6	0.0	15.0
2018–19	(Spain) UCAM Murcia	33	18	21.1	.446	.363	.727	2.4	2.4	0.8	0.0	15.0
2019–20	(Spain) UCAM Murcia	19	19	28.3	.414	.372	.842	2.5	3.6	0.5	0.1	21.2
Career		68	49	23.7	.433	.345	.808	2.5	2.8	0.7	0.0	16.4

==== NBA G League ====
Year	Team	GP	GS	MPG	FG%	3P%	FT%	RPG	APG	SPG	BPG	PPG
2015–16	Bakersfield Jam	47	0	20.7	.462	.333	.756	3.1	3.5	0.7	0.0	12.8
2016–17	Northern Arizona Suns	42	40	31.7	.396	.347	.709	4.0	5.3	1.2	0.1	15.5
2017–18	Suns & 87ers	36	34	31.8	.409	.321	.810	4.0	6.0	1.6	0.1	15.6

=== College ===
Year	Team	GP	GS	MPG	FG%	3P%	FT%	RPG	APG	SPG	BPG	PPG
2011–12	Colorado	35	1	21.5	.402	.372	.762	2.7	1.4	0.7	0.0	9.1
2012–13	Colorado	33	33	31.8	.395	.312	.704	3.5	2.2	1.2	0.0	12.4
2013–14	Colorado	35	35	30.5	.389	.272	.818	3.7	3.3	1.3	0.1	13.7
2014–15	Colorado	31	28	30.2	.387	.329	.834	3.3	3.2	1.4	0.1	17.2
Career		134	97	28.4	.384	.316	.792	3.3	2.5	1.2	0.0	13.0

=== CBA ===
Year	Team	GP	GS	MPG	FG%	3P%	FT%	RPG	APG	SPG	BPG	PPG
2020–21	Shenzhen	39	38	34.0	.481	.427	.765	5.0	7.6	1.0	0.1	26.2
2021–22	Shenzhen	37	34	27.5	.445	.369	.723	3.4	6.8	1.2	0.1	16.5

Source: basketball-stats.de (Date: 27. March 2022)

== Personal life ==
Booker's father is Swiss, mother is Puerto Rican.
