= 2014–15 Montana State Bobcats men's basketball team =

American college basketball season

2014–15 Montana State Bobcats men's basketball
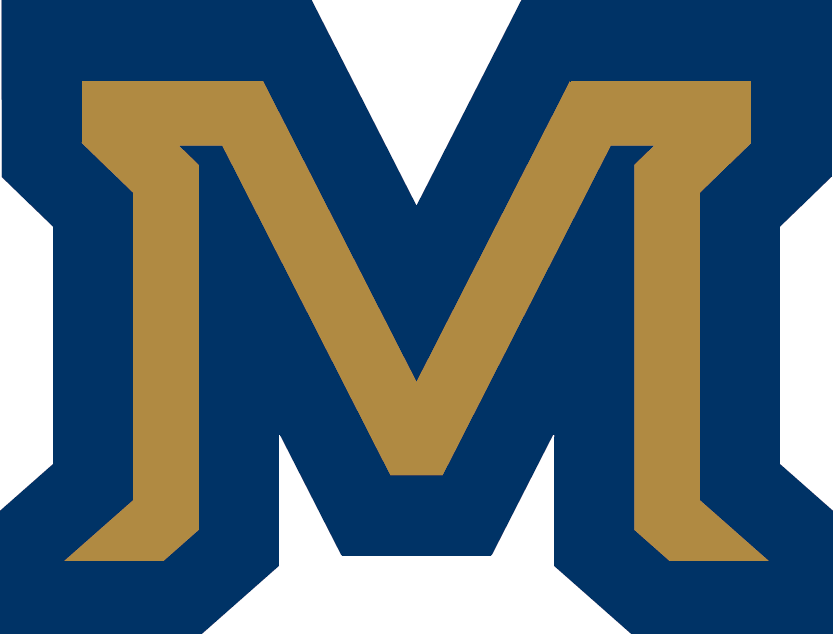
- Conference: Big Sky Conference
- Record: 7–23 (4–14 Big Sky)
- Head coach: Brian Fish (1st season)
- Assistant coaches: Kenya Crandell; Chris Haslam; Brandon Lincoln
- Home arena: Worthington Arena

2014–15 Big Sky men's basketball standings
	Conf.				Overall
Team	W		L	PCT	W		L	PCT
Montana	14	–	4	.778	20	–	13	.606
Eastern Washington †	14	–	4	.778	26	–	9	.743
Sacramento State	13	–	5	.722	21	–	12	.636
Northern Arizona	13	–	5	.722	23	–	15	.605
Northern Colorado	10	–	8	.556	15	–	15	.500
Portland State	9	–	9	.500	15	–	14	.517
Idaho	8	–	10	.444	13	–	17	.433
Weber State	8	–	10	.444	13	–	17	.433
Southern Utah	7	–	11	.389	10	–	19	.345
North Dakota	4	–	14	.222	8	–	22	.267
Idaho State	4	–	14	.222	7	–	23	.233
Montana State	4	–	14	.222	7	–	23	.233
† Conference tournament winner

The 2014–15 Montana State Bobcats men's basketball team represented Montana State University during the 2014–15 NCAA Division I men's basketball season. The Bobcats, led by first year head coach Brian Fish, played their home games at Worthington Arena and were members of the Big Sky Conference. They finished the season 7–23, 4–14 in Big Sky play to finish in a three way tie for tenth place. They failed to qualify for the Big Sky tournament.

== Roster ==
Number	Name	Position	Height	Weight	Year	Hometown
0	Zach Green	Guard	6–4	195	Freshman	Gilbert, Arizona
1	Stephan Holm	Guard	6–3	175	Sophomore	Riverton, Utah
2	Blake Brumwell	Center	6–7	250	Senior	Big Sandy, Montana
3	Michael Dison	Guard	5–9	160	Senior	Houston, Texas
4	Joseph Frenchwood IV	Guard	6–1	175	Freshman	Newark, California
13	Terrell Brown	Forward	6–4	200	Junior	Colorado Springs, Colorado
20	Ryan Shannon	Forward	6–8	225	Sophomore	Marysville, Washington
22	Marcus Colbert	Guard	5–11	180	Junior	Post Falls, Idaho
24	Eric Norman	Forward	6–9	220	Senior	San Diego, California
33	Quinn Price	Forward	6–9	205	Freshman	Casa Grande, Arizona
34	Danny Robison	Forward	6–8	225	Junior	Billings, Montana
41	Bradley Fisher	Center	7–0	245	Freshman	Chorley, England

== Schedule ==
Date time, TV	Opponent	Result	Record	Site (attendance) city, state
Exhibition
11/05/2014*; 7:00 pm	Montana–Western	W 86–61		Worthington Arena; Bozeman, MT
Regular Season
11/14/2014*; 10:00 pm, P12N	at UCLA	L 78–113	0–1	Pauley Pavilion (6,523); Los Angeles, CA
11/17/2014*; 7:00 pm	at Grand Canyon; Cawood Ledford Classic	L 45–61	0–2	GCU Arena (6,527); Phoenix, AZ
11/19/2014*; 8:00 pm	at Cal State Northridge	L 65–72	0–3	Matadome (1,790); Northridge, CA
11/21/2014*; 9:00 pm, ESPN3	at Buffalo; Cawood Ledford Classic			Alumni Arena; Amherst, NY
11/23/2014*; 8:00 pm, SECN	at No. 1 Kentucky; Cawood Ledford Classic	L 28–86	0–4	Rupp Arena (22,384); Lexington, KY
11/28/2014*; 7:00 pm	Texas–Arlington; Cawood Ledford Classic	W 104–81	1–4	Worthington Arena (1,526); Bozeman, MT
11/30/2014*; 5:00 pm	North Dakota State	L 51–72	1–5	Worthington Arena (1,188); Bozeman, MT
12/03/2014*; 7:00 pm	South Dakota Mines	W 79–41	2–5	Worthington Arena (1,233); Bozeman, MT
12/06/2014*; 7:00 pm	Utah Valley	W 68–60	3–5	Worthington Arena (1,527); Bozeman, MT
12/14/2014*; 12:00 pm	at Wyoming	L 61–70	3–6	Arena-Auditorium (4,567); Laramie, WY
12/18/2014*; 6:30 pm	at South Dakota	L 53–55	3–7	DakotaDome (1,328); Vermillion, SD
12/20/2014*; 8:00 pm	at Portland	L 60–87	3–8	Chiles Center (1,602); Portland, OR
12/23/2014*; 7:00 pm	Wyoming	L 51–61	3–9	Worthington Arena (2,107); Bozeman, MT
01/01/2015; 7:00 pm	North Dakota	L 60–67	3–10 (0–1)	Worthington Arena (1,573); Bozeman, MT
01/03/2015; 2:30 pm	Northern Colorado	L 54–62	3–11 (0–2)	Worthington Arena (1,347); Bozeman, MT
01/08/2015; 7:00 pm	at Idaho State	L 61–70	3–12 (0–3)	Holt Arena (1,426); Pocatello, ID
01/10/2015; 7:00 pm	at Weber State	L 62–65	3–13 (0–4)	Dee Events Center (6,721); Ogden, UT
01/17/2015; 7:00 pm	at Montana	L 48–63	3–14 (0–5)	Dahlberg Arena (4,915); Missoula, MT
01/22/2015; 7:00 pm	Southern Utah	W 79–65	4–14 (1–5)	Worthington Arena (1,587); Bozeman, MT
01/24/2015; 2:30 pm	Northern Arizona	L 64–71	4–15 (1–6)	Worthington Arena (1,767); Bozeman, MT
01/29/2015; 8:00 pm	at Sacramento State	L 59–75	4–16 (1–7)	Colberg Court (1,215); Sacramento, CA
01/31/2015; 8:00 pm	at Portland State	L 62–80	4–17 (1–8)	Stott Center (876); Portland, OR
02/05/2015; 7:00 pm	Idaho	L 71–80	4–18 (1–9)	Worthington Arena (1,477); Bozeman, MT
02/07/2015; 2:30 pm	Eastern Washington	L 51–61	4–19 (1–10)	Worthington Arena (1,667); Bozeman, MT
02/12/2015; 7:00 pm	at Northern Colorado	W 90–87	5–19 (2–10)	Bank of Colorado Arena (1,785); Greeley, CO
02/14/2015; 1:00 pm	at North Dakota	W 80–78	6–19 (3–10)	Betty Engelstad Sioux Center (1,967); Grand Forks, ND
02/19/2015; 7:00 pm	Weber State	L 71–74	6–20 (3–11)	Worthington Arena (1,613); Bozeman, MT
02/21/2015; 2:30 pm	Idaho State	W 67–53	7–20 (4–11)	Worthington Arena (1,677); Bozeman, MT
02/26/2015; 7:00 pm	at Eastern Washington	L 68–92	7–21 (4–12)	Reese Court (2,226); Cheney, WA
02/28/2015; 8:00 pm	at Idaho	L 73–80	7–22 (4–13)	Cowan Spectrum (1,500); Moscow, ID
03/07/2015; 7:00 pm	Montana	L 54–70	7–23 (4–14)	Worthington Arena (3,021); Bozeman, MT
*Non-conference game. ^{#}Rankings from AP Poll. (#) Tournament seedings in parentheses. All times are in Mountain Time.

== See also ==
2014–15 Montana State Bobcats women's basketball team
