= 2014–15 University of North Dakota men's basketball team =

American college basketball season

2014–15 University of North Dakota men's basketball
- Conference: Big Sky Conference
- Record: 8–22 (4–14 Big Sky)
- Head coach: Brian Jones (9th season)
- Assistant coaches: Shawn Dirden; Steve Grabowski; Jason Shay
- Home arena: Betty Engelstad Sioux Center

2014–15 Big Sky men's basketball standings
| | Conf. | | | | Overall |
| Team | W | | L | PCT | W | | L | PCT |
|---|---|---|---|---|---|---|---|---|
| Montana | 14 | – | 4 | .778 | 20 | – | 13 | .606 |
| Eastern Washington † | 14 | – | 4 | .778 | 26 | – | 9 | .743 |
| Sacramento State | 13 | – | 5 | .722 | 21 | – | 12 | .636 |
| Northern Arizona | 13 | – | 5 | .722 | 23 | – | 15 | .605 |
| Northern Colorado | 10 | – | 8 | .556 | 15 | – | 15 | .500 |
| Portland State | 9 | – | 9 | .500 | 15 | – | 14 | .517 |
| Idaho | 8 | – | 10 | .444 | 13 | – | 17 | .433 |
| Weber State | 8 | – | 10 | .444 | 13 | – | 17 | .433 |
| Southern Utah | 7 | – | 11 | .389 | 10 | – | 19 | .345 |
| North Dakota | 4 | – | 14 | .222 | 8 | – | 22 | .267 |
| Idaho State | 4 | – | 14 | .222 | 7 | – | 23 | .233 |
| Montana State | 4 | – | 14 | .222 | 7 | – | 23 | .233 |
† Conference tournament winner

The 2014–15 University of North Dakota men's basketball team represented the University of North Dakota during the 2014–15 NCAA Division I men's basketball season. They were led by ninth year head coach Brian Jones and played their home games at the Betty Engelstad Sioux Center. They were members of the Big Sky Conference. They finished the season 8–22, 4–14 in Big Sky play to finish in a three way tie for tenth place. They failed to qualify for the Big Sky tournament.

== Roster ==
| Number | Name | Position | Height | Weight | Year | Hometown |
|---|---|---|---|---|---|---|
| 0 | Geno Crandall | Guard | 6–3 | 170 | Freshman | Minneapolis, Minnesota |
| 1 | Jaron Nash | point Forward | 6–8 | 195 | Senior | Waterloo, Iowa |
| 2 | Cole Stefan | Guard | 6–3 | 190 | Senior | Minnetonka, Minnesota |
| 3 | Estan Tyler | Guard | 6–1 | 180 | Junior | Saint Paul, Minnesota |
| 5 | Carson Shanks | Center | 7–0 | 230 | Freshman | Prior Lake, Minnesota |
| 10 | Shane Benton | Guard | 6–3 | 205 | Junior | Cedar Rapids, Iowa |
| 12 | Lenny Antwi | Guard | 6–1 | 190 | Senior | Montreal, Quebec, Canada |
| 14 | Terrel de Rouen | Guard | 6–2 | 185 | Junior | Las Cruces, New Mexico |
| 20 | Thomas Blake | Guard | 6–2 | 200 | Sophomore | Hagerstown, Maryland |
| 21 | Quinton Hooker | Guard | 6–0 | 205 | Sophomore | Brooklyn Park, Minnesota |
| 22 | Kraiq Shields | Forward | 6–8 | 190 | Freshman | Kyle, Texas |
| 25 | Dustin Hobaugh | Guard | 6–5 | 200 | Junior | League City, Texas |
| 31 | Bryce Cashman | Center | 6–10 | 225 | Freshman | Weston, Missouri |
| 33 | Chad Calcaterra | Forward | 6–9 | 235 | Senior | Cloquet, Minnesota |
| 35 | Josiah Coleman | Forward | 6–5 | 195 | Junior | Cedar Rapids, Iowa |
| 41 | Ryan Salmonson | Center | 6–10 | 235 | Senior | Colfax, California |
| 50 | James Richman | Forward | 6–7 | 220 | Freshman | Tower City, North Dakota |

== Schedule ==
| Date time, TV | Opponent | Result | Record | Site (attendance) city, state |
Regular season
| 11/15/2014*; 1:00 pm | at Northern Iowa | W 64–52 | 0–1 | McLeod Center (3,716); Cedar Falls, IA |
| 11/18/2014*; 6:00 pm | Mayville State | W 76–39 | 1–1 | Betty Engelstad Sioux Center (N/A); Grand Forks, ND |
| 11/21/2014*; 7:00 pm, Midco | at South Dakota State | L 72–74 | 1–2 | Frost Arena (2,651); Brookings, SD |
| 11/26/2014*; 9:30 pm | vs. Alabama State; Utah Tournament | W 75–68 | 2–2 | Jon M. Huntsman Center (57); Salt Lake City, UT |
| 11/28/2014*; 9:00 pm, P12N | at Utah; Utah Tournament | L 53–90 | 2–3 | Jon M. Huntsman Center (9,794); Salt Lake City, UT |
| 11/29/2014*; 6:30 pm | vs. Texas–Pan American; Utah Tournament | L 60–78 | 2–4 | Jon M. Huntsman Center (9,921); Salt Lake City, UT |
| 12/06/2014*; 2:00 pm | at Drake | W 63–62 | 3–4 | Knapp Center (3,162); Des Moines, IA |
| 12/08/2014*; 8:00 pm, ESPNU | at Minnesota | L 56–92 | 3–5 | Williams Arena (11,185); Minneapolis, MN |
| 12/13/2014*; 7:00 pm, NBC ND | at North Dakota State | L 42–71 | 3–6 | Scheels Arena (4,189); Fargo, ND |
| 12/19/2014*; 8:00 pm, FS North+/FCS Central | Dickinson State | W 78–48 | 4–6 | Betty Engelstad Sioux Center (1,371); Grand Forks, ND |
| 12/22/2014*; 8:00 pm, FS North | at Marquette | L 54–67 | 4–7 | BMO Harris Bradley Center (12,536); Milwaukee, WI |
| 01/01/2015; 8:00 pm | at Montana State | W 67–60 | 5–7 (1–0) | Worthington Arena (1,573); Bozeman, MT |
| 01/03/2015; 8:00 pm | at Montana | L 63–74 | 5–8 (1–1) | Dahlberg Arena (3,465); Missoula, MT |
| 01/08/2015; 8:00 pm, FS North+/FCS Pacific | Sacramento State | L 61–63 | 5–9 (1–2) | Betty Engelstad Sioux Center (1,372); Grand Forks, ND |
| 01/10/2015; 2:00 pm, Midco/ FCS Pacific | Portland State | L 75–82 | 5–10 (1–3) | Betty Engelstad Sioux Center (1,590); Grand Forks, ND |
| 01/17/2015; 3:00 pm, Midco/FCS Pacific | Northern Colorado | L 78–88 ^{OT} | 5–11 (1–4) | Betty Engelstad Sioux Center (2,321); Grand Forks, ND |
| 01/22/2015; 9:00 pm | at Idaho | W 71–63 | 6–11 (2–4) | Cowan Spectrum (1,421); Moscow, ID |
| 01/24/2015; 4:00 pm | at Eastern Washington | L 80–102 | 6–12 (2–5) | Reese Court (2,097); Cheney, WA |
| 01/29/2015; 7:00 pm, FS North+/FCS Pacific | Weber State | W 67–60 | 6–13 (2–6) | Betty Engelstad Sioux Center (1,751); Grand Forks, ND |
| 01/31/2015; 2:00 pm, Midco/FCS Pacific | Idaho State | W 80–69 | 7–13 (3–6) | Betty Engelstad Sioux Center (1,710); Grand Forks, ND |
| 02/05/2015; 8:00 pm | at Southern Utah | W 89–85 ^{OT} | 8–13 (4–6) | Centrum Arena (1,667); Cedar City, UT |
| 02/07/2015; 3:00 pm, FCS Atlantic | at Northern Arizona | L 63–88 | 8–14 (4–7) | Walkup Skydome (1,411); Flagstaff, AZ |
| 02/12/2015; 7:00 pm, Midco/FCS Pacific | Montana | L 61–65 | 8–15 (4–8) | Betty Engelstad Sioux Center (1,568); Grand Forks, ND |
| 02/14/2015; 7:00 pm, FS North | Montana State | L 78–80 | 8–16 (4–9) | Betty Engelstad Sioux Center (1,967); Grand Forks, ND |
| 02/19/2015; 9:00 pm | at Portland State | L 70–80 | 8–17 (4–10) | Stott Center (817); Portland, OR |
| 02/21/2015; 9:00 pm | at Sacramento State | L 66–74 | 8–18 (4–11) | Colberg Court (1,231); Sacramento, CA |
| 02/26/2015; 7:00 pm, Midco/FCS Pacific | Northern Arizona | L 75–85 | 8–19 (4–12) | Betty Engelstad Sioux Center (1,454); Grand Forks, ND |
| 02/28/2015; 2:00 pm, FS North/FCS Pacific | Southern Utah | L 65–71 | 8–20 (4–13) | Betty Engelstad Sioux Center (1,908); Grand Forks, ND |
| 03/03/2015*; 7:00 pm, FS North+/FCS Pacific | Omaha | L 78–80 | 8–21 | Betty Engelstad Sioux Center (1,479); Grand Forks, ND |
| 03/07/2015; 8:00 pm | at Northern Colorado | L 71–72 | 8–22 (4–14) | Bank of Colorado Arena (2,019); Greeley, CO |
*Non-conference game. ^{#}Rankings from AP Poll. (#) Tournament seedings in parentheses. All times are in Central Time.
