= Bridgepoint High School =

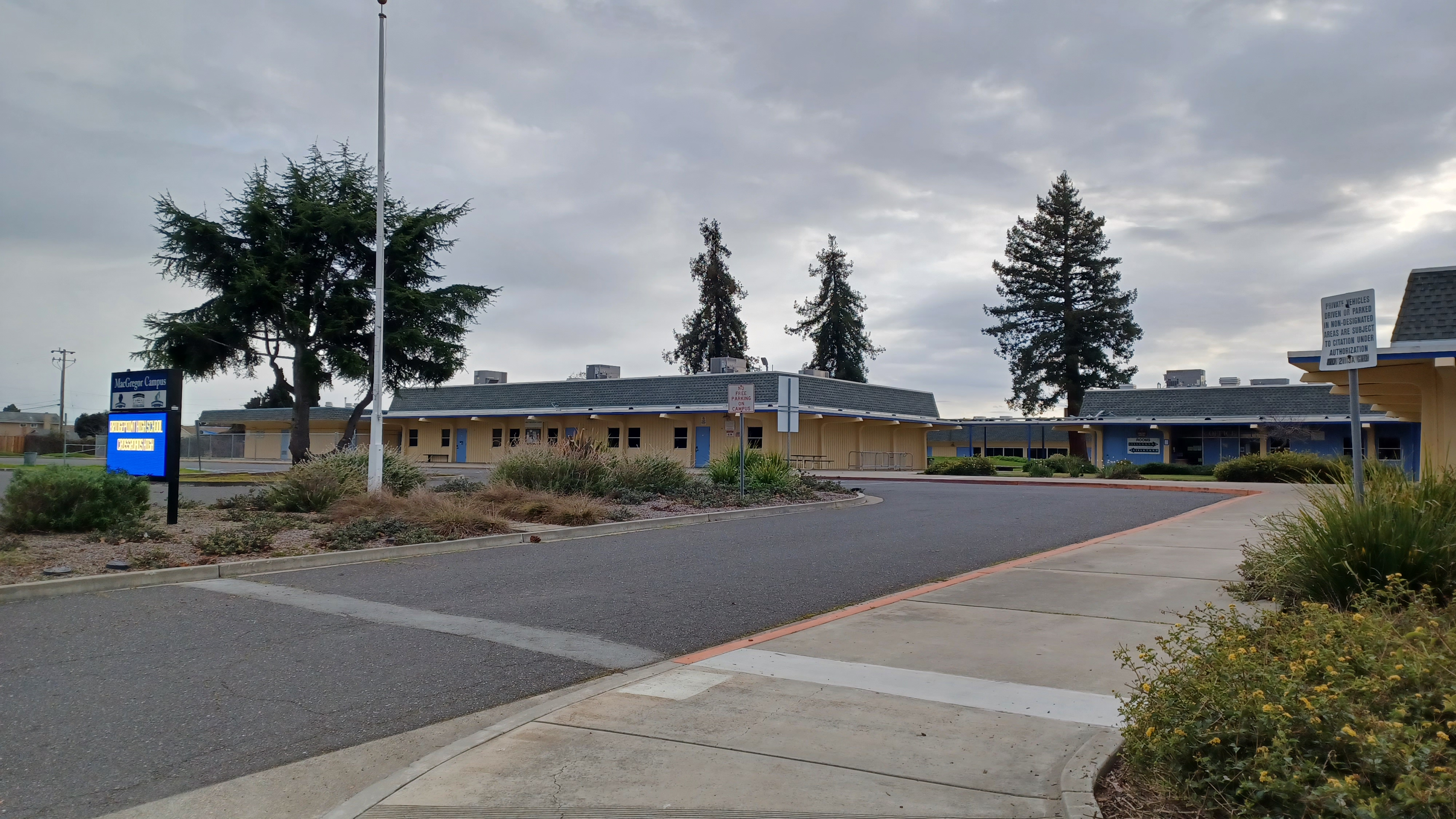

Location
- 35753 Cedar Boulevard; Newark, California 94560; United States; 37.549932°N 122.037377°W

Information
- Type: Public continuation high school
- School district: Newark Unified School District
- CEEB code: 052114
- NCES School ID: 062706004080
- Principal: Julie Calderon
- Teaching staff: 6.83 (on an FTE basis)
- Grades: 9-12
- Enrollment: 72 (2016-2017)
- Student to teacher ratio: 10.54
- Mascot: Panther
- Website: bridgepoint.newarkunified.org

Bridgepoint High School is a public continuation high school in Newark, California, United States.
