= ZipZoomfly =

Internet computer part retailer

ZipZoomfly was an internet retailer for computer parts and related products. Based in Newark, California, ZipZoomfly was founded in 1998 under the name and ownership of XtraPlus Corporation. The site relaunched in January 2000 as Googlegear, but after a dispute with Google in 2003, they relinquished the domain name and rebranded as ZipZoomfly.

== Name change ==
A formal complaint by Google to an ICANN domain-name dispute resolution provider led to the company changing its name from Googlegear to ZipZoomFly in 2003. The domain googlegear.com is now owned by Google, was redirected to a Google page that used to explain that Googlegear had never been associated with Google and provided a link to zipzoomfly.com, but it now it displays an HTTP 404 error.

== Mascot ==
The original mascot of Googlegear was a smiling bean-shaped cartoon character as the first letter "O" in the name. Named GoogleGuy, the mascot was shown giving a thumbs-up sign with one of his two floating hands. The U.S. trademark filing describes GoogleGuy as an edible nut without a shell. Nevertheless, the website claimed that GoogleGuy was neither a bean nor a pancake, but a numeral "zero" from the virtual googol of products they carried.

== Claims of fraud ==
Several customers accused ZipZoomFly of committing "rebate fraud" or promising good deals on technology once rebates are applied. Several reports indicated that the company failed to follow up on rebates, making false claims of refunding money lost through rebate fraud.

In January, 2011, the company's Better Business Bureau (BBB) accreditation was revoked due to failure to respond to one or more customer complaints filed with the BBB.

In November 2011, the company's BBB rating was again listed as their highest rating: A+.

Their web site was marked "closed for maintenance" beginning in September, 2011.

In January 2012, the website was updated to read:

Dear ZipZoomFly shoppers, We apologize for the inconvenience. Please come back later.
Thank you - NM80

In May 2012 the website went offline permanently.
