= 2014–15 Idaho State Bengals men's basketball team =

American college basketball season

2014–15 Idaho State Bengals men's basketball
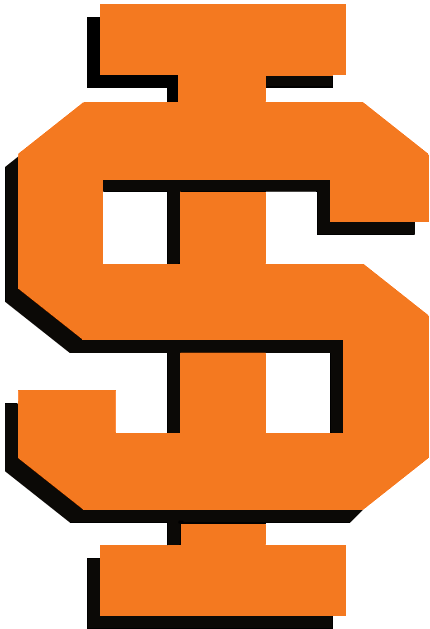
- Conference: Big Sky Conference
- Record: 7–23 (4–14 Big Sky)
- Head coach: Bill Evans (3rd season)
- Assistant coaches: Andy Ward; Jay Collins; Tim Walsh
- Home arena: Holt Arena; Reed Gym

2014–15 Big Sky men's basketball standings
	Conf.				Overall
Team	W		L	PCT	W		L	PCT
Montana	14	–	4	.778	20	–	13	.606
Eastern Washington †	14	–	4	.778	26	–	9	.743
Sacramento State	13	–	5	.722	21	–	12	.636
Northern Arizona	13	–	5	.722	23	–	15	.605
Northern Colorado	10	–	8	.556	15	–	15	.500
Portland State	9	–	9	.500	15	–	14	.517
Idaho	8	–	10	.444	13	–	17	.433
Weber State	8	–	10	.444	13	–	17	.433
Southern Utah	7	–	11	.389	10	–	19	.345
North Dakota	4	–	14	.222	8	–	22	.267
Idaho State	4	–	14	.222	7	–	23	.233
Montana State	4	–	14	.222	7	–	23	.233
† Conference tournament winner

The 2014–15 Idaho State Bengals men's basketball team represented Idaho State University during the 2014–15 NCAA Division I men's basketball season. The Bengals, led by third-year head coach Bill Evans, played ten of their home games at Holt Arena and five home games at Reed Gym. They were members of the Big Sky Conference. They finished the season 7–23, 4–14 in Big Sky play to finish in a three-way tie for tenth place. They failed to qualify for the Big Sky tournament.

== Roster ==
Number	Name	Position	Height	Weight	Year	Hometown
1	Geno Luzcando	Guard	6–3	190	Freshman	Estación Central, Chile
3	Ben Wilson	Guard	6–5	207	RS junior	Bardon, Queensland, Australia
5	Jeffrey Solarin	Forward	6–4	210	Senior	Denver, Colorado
10	Evann Hall	Guard	6–4	210	Junior	Thousand Oaks, California
11	Nnamdi Ezenwa	Forward	6–5	200	RS senior	El Paso, Texas
12	Ajak Magot	Center	6–11	225	RS senior	Tucson, Arizona
13	Novak Topalovic	Center	7–0	230	Freshman	Niš, Serbia
21	Andre Lavik	Forward/center	6–9	210	Sophomore	Žiar nad Hronom, Slovakia
22	Marcus Bradley	Forward	6–6	225	Junior	Highland, California
23	Spencer Nicolds	Forward	6–7	190	Freshman	Gilbert, Arizona
24	Chris Hansen	Guard/forward	6–4	210	Senior	Fort Collins, Colorado
25	Erik Nakken	Guard	6–3	195	RS freshman	Cedar City, Utah
32	Ian Fox	Guard	6–0	170	Freshman	Carlsbad, California
33	Justin Smith	Guard	6–5	200	Sophomore	Colorado Springs, Colorado

== Schedule ==
Date time, TV	Opponent	Result	Record	Site (attendance) city, state
Exhibition
10/30/2014*; 7:00 pm	Great Falls	W 65–40		Reed Gym (1,288); Pocatello, ID
11/05/2014*; 7:00 pm	Montana Tech	W 66–59		Reed Gym (1,318); Pocatello, ID
Regular season
11/14/2014*; 8:00 pm, RTRM	at New Mexico	L 55–79	0–1	The Pit (13,927); Albuquerque, NM
11/16/2014*; 4:00 pm	at Denver	L 38–54	0–2	Magness Arena (3,002); Denver, CO
11/21/2014*; 7:00 pm, P12N	at Washington State	L 68–80	0–3	Beasley Coliseum (2,138); Pullman, WA
11/26/2013*; 7:00 pm	Utah Valley	L 57–60	0–4	Reed Gym (1,121); Pocatello, Idaho
12/02/2014*; 7:00 pm	Montana Western	W 86–66	1–4	Holt Arena (1,323); Pocatello, ID
12/06/2014*; 7:00 pm	Pacific	L 62–68	1–5	Holt Arena (1,554); Pocatello, ID
12/09/2014*; 7:00 pm	at Grand Canyon	W 67–51	2–5	GCU Arena (4,766); Phoenix, AZ
12/13/2014*; 7:00 pm	Northwest Nazarene	W 69–57	3–5	Holt Arena (1,391); Pocatello, ID
12/18/2014*; 5:30 pm	vs. South Dakota State; World Vision Classic	L 72–75 ^{OT}	3–6	Smith Spectrum (7,049); Logan, UT
12/19/2014*; 8:00 pm	at Utah State; World Vision Classic	L 56–69	3–7	Smith Spectrum (7,188); Logan, UT
12/20/2014*; 5:30 pm	vs. Cal State Bakersfield; World Vision Classic	L 50–59	3–8	Smith Spectrum (7,216); Logan, UT
12/23/2014*; 7:00 pm	at Utah Valley	L 47–51	3–9	UCCU Center (1,109); Orem, UT
01/01/2015; 8:00 pm	at Idaho	L 54–77	3–10 (0–1)	Cowan Spectrum (812); Moscow, ID
01/03/2015; 3:00 pm	at Eastern Washington	L 57–65	3–11 (0–2)	Reese Court (1,684); Cheney, WA
01/08/2015; 7:00 pm	Montana State	W 70–61	4–11 (1–2)	Holt Arena (1,426); Pocatello, ID
01/10/2015; 7:00 pm	Montana	L 64–90	4–12 (1–3)	Holt Arena (1,577); Pocatello, ID
01/15/2015; 7:00 pm	at Southern Utah	L 67–71	4–13 (1–4)	Centrum Arena (N/A); Cedar City, UT
01/17/2015; 4:00 pm	at Northern Arizona	L 69–72	4–14 (1–5)	Walkup Skydome (1,382); Fkagstaff
01/22/2015; 7:00 pm	Sacramento State	L 59–62	4–15 (1–6)	Reed Gym (1,500); Pocatello, ID
01/24/2015; 7:00 pm	Portland State	W 80–76	5–15 (2–6)	Reed Gym (1,763); Pocatello, ID
01/29/2015; 7:00 pm	at Northern Colorado	L 76–79	5–16 (2–7)	Bank of Colorado Arena (1,617); Greeley, CO
01/31/2015; 2:00 pm	at North Dakota	L 69–80	5–17 (2–8)	Betty Engelstad Sioux Center (1,710); Grand Forks, ND
02/07/2015; 7:00 pm	Weber State	L 63–70	5–18 (2–9)	Holt Arena (1,892); Pocatello, ID
02/12/2015; 7:00 pm	Northern Arizona	W 80–66	6–18 (3–9)	Holt Arena (1,492); Pocatello, ID
02/14/2015; 7:00 pm	Southern Utah	L 67–71	6–19 (3–10)	Holt Arena (1,582); Pocatello, ID
02/19/2015; 7:00 pm	at Montana	L 77–88	6–20 (3–11)	Dahlberg Arena (3,313); Missoula, MT
02/21/2015; 2:30 pm	at Montana State	L 53–67	6–21 (3–12)	Worthington Arena (1,677); Bozeman, MT
02/28/2015; 2:30 pm	at Weber State	L 57–61	6–22 (3–13)	Dee Events Center (6,325); Ogden, UT
03/05/2015; 7:00 pm	Eastern Washington	L 81–85	6–23 (3–14)	Holt Arena (1,474); Pocatello, ID
03/07/2015; 7:00 pm	Idaho	W 67–65	7–23 (4–14)	Holt Arena (1,964); Pocatello, ID
*Non-conference game. ^{#}Rankings from AP Poll. (#) Tournament seedings in parentheses. All times are in Mountain Time.
