= Newark Unified School District =

School district in California, United States

Address
- 5715 Musick Avenue Newark, California, 94560; United States

District information
- Type: Public
- Grades: K–12
- NCES District ID: 0627060

Students and staff
- Students: 5,507
- Teachers: 233.27
- Staff: 237.35
- Student–teacher ratio: 23.61

Other information
- Website: www.newarkunified.org

The Newark Unified School District (NUSD) is the public school district for Newark, California, United States. NUSD was formed in 1964.

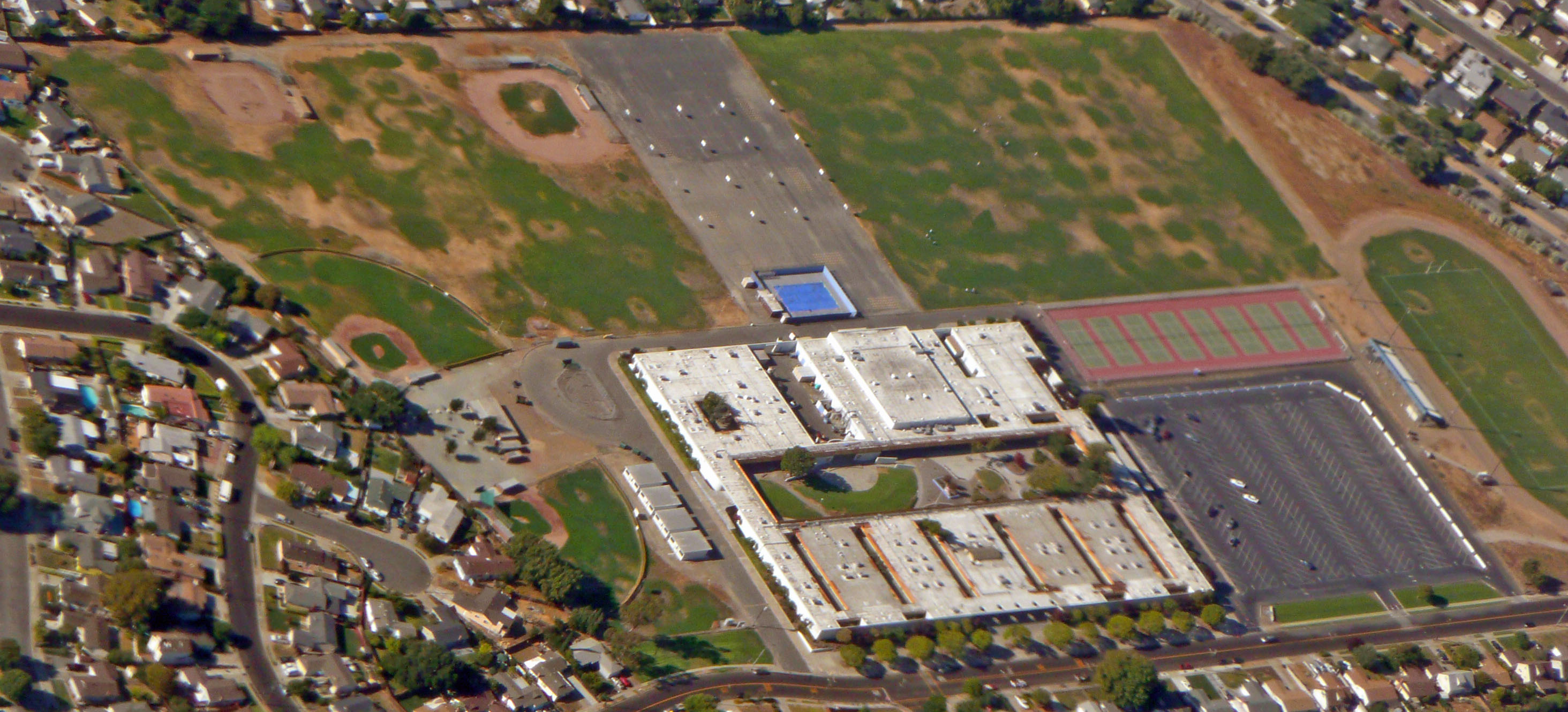
Newark Junior High School

As of 2023–24, NUSD consists of the following schools:

- Birch Grove Primary Elementary School (Formerly named James L. Bunker; it was renamed to BGP in 2016.)
- Birch Grove Intermediate Elementary School (Formerly named Louis Milani; it was renamed to BGI in 2016.)
- Coyote Hills Elementary School (Formerly named James A. Graham; it was renamed to Coyote Hills in 2021. It was the result of a merger between Graham Elementary and Snow Elementary; the Snow campus closed in 2021.)
- Kennedy Elementary School
- Lincoln Elementary School
- Schilling Elementary School
- Newark Middle School
- Newark Memorial High School

At the NUSD MacGregor Alternative Education Center:

- Bridgepoint High School
- Crossroads Independent School
- Newark Adult Education Center

Former NUSD schools:

- Snow Elementary School (Closed in 2021)
- EL Musick Elementary School & Preschool (The Preschool was formerly located in the Whiteford building on the MacGregor campus.) (Closed in 2022)
- Ruschin Louis Elementary School (NUSD stopped using it as a school in 1989. In 2015, the land was sold to residential developers for housing.)

The NUSD Board of Education is composed of five Newark citizens, elected to serve overlapping terms. They are elected at-large by the registered voters in Newark. The Board functions as the legislative body of the school district and establishes policies by which the school district is operated.
