= 2014–15 Northern Colorado Bears men's basketball team =

American college basketball season

2014–15 Northern Colorado Bears men's basketball
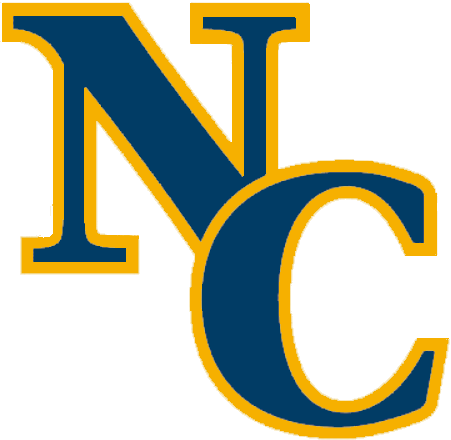
- Conference: Big Sky Conference
- Record: 0-0 (15 wins, 15 losses vacated) (0-0 (10 wins, 8 losses vacated) Big Sky)
- Head coach: B. J. Hill (5th season)
- Assistant coaches: Will Hensley; Joel Davidson; Eric Murphy
- Home arena: Bank of Colorado Arena

2014–15 Big Sky men's basketball standings
	Conf.				Overall
Team	W		L	PCT	W		L	PCT
Montana	14	–	4	.778	20	–	13	.606
Eastern Washington †	14	–	4	.778	26	–	9	.743
Sacramento State	13	–	5	.722	21	–	12	.636
Northern Arizona	13	–	5	.722	23	–	15	.605
Northern Colorado	10	–	8	.556	15	–	15	.500
Portland State	9	–	9	.500	15	–	14	.517
Idaho	8	–	10	.444	13	–	17	.433
Weber State	8	–	10	.444	13	–	17	.433
Southern Utah	7	–	11	.389	10	–	19	.345
North Dakota	4	–	14	.222	8	–	22	.267
Idaho State	4	–	14	.222	7	–	23	.233
Montana State	4	–	14	.222	7	–	23	.233
† Conference tournament winner

The 2014–15 Northern Colorado Bears men's basketball team represented the University of Northern Colorado during the 2014–15 NCAA Division I men's basketball season. The Bears were led by fifth year head coach B. J. Hill and played their home games at the Bank of Colorado Arena. They were a member of the Big Sky Conference. They finished the season 15–15, 10–8 in Big Sky play to finish in fifth place. They lost in the quarterfinals of the Big Sky tournament to Northern Arizona. The Bears weren't invited to a postseason tournament.

== Roster ==
Number	Name	Position	Height	Weight	Year	Hometown
0	Corey Spence	Guard	5–9	175	Senior	Baltimore, Maryland
1	Cody McDavis	Forward	6–8	230	Junior	Phoenix, Arizona
2	Cameron Michael	Guard	6–5	185	Sophomore	Loveland, Colorado
3	Jordan Wilson	Guard	5–7	155	Sophomore	Los Angeles, California
5	Tevin Svihovec	Guard	6–2	190	Senior	Kingwood, Texas
11	Spencer Mathis	Forward	6–7	185	Freshman	Las Vegas, Nevada
13	Dominique Lee	Forward	6–5	215	Senior	Oakland, California
22	Tim Huskisson	Forward	6–5	210	Senior	Willard, Missouri
23	Collin Sanger	Forward	6–5	200	Freshman	Sterling, Colorado
24	Anthony Johnson	Guard	6–2	190	Sophomore	Indianapolis, Indiana
30	Jon'te Dotson	Guard	6–3	185	Sophomore	Denver, Colorado
33	Jeremy Verhagen	Forward	6–10	195	Freshman	Florence, Arizona
42	Drew Bender	Guard	6–5	195	Sophomore	Phoenix, Arizona
44	Dwight Smith	Guard	6–4	190	Senior	Omaha, Nebraska

== Schedule ==
Date time, TV	Rank^{#}	Opponent^{#}	Result	Record	Site (attendance) city, state
Exhibition
11/07/2014*; 7:00 pm		Chadron State	W 95–56		Bank of Colorado Arena (938); Greeley, CO
Regular season
11/14/2014*; 7:00 pm		Black Hills State	W 83–62	1–0	Bank of Colorado Arena (1,429); Greeley, CO
11/16/2014*; 2:00 pm		at Wyoming; Wyoming Tournament	L 70–78	1–1	Arena-Auditorium (5,876); Laramie, WY
11/19/2014*; 7:00 pm, CET		at New Mexico State; Wyoming Tournament	L 65–86	1–2	Pan American Center (5,690); Las Cruces, NM
11/24/2014*; 7:30 pm		Colorado Christian	W 93–58	2–2	Bank of Colorado Arena (1,320); Greeley, CO
11/28/2014*; 7:00 pm		Stetson; Wyoming Tournament	W 82–62	3–2	Bank of Colorado Arena (1,032); Greeley, CO
11/30/2014*; 2:00 pm		Florida A&M; Wyoming Tournament	W 95–56	4–2	Bank of Colorado Arena (N/A); Greeley, CO
12/07/2014*; 2:00 pm		at Colorado State	L 58–66	4–3	Moby Arena (3,043); Fort Collins, CO
12/13/2014*; 2:00 pm		at Colorado	L 68–93	4–4	Coors Events Center (9,173); Boulder, CO
12/17/2014*; 7:00 pm		at Omaha	L 82–92	4–5	Ralston Arena (1,287); Ralston, NE
12/20/2014*; 7:00 pm		Jacksonville State	W 69–60	5–5	Bank of Colorado Arena (1,206); Greeley, CO
12/22/2014*; 7:00 pm		UC Davis	L 63–73	5–6	Bank of Colorado Arena (710); Greeley, CO
01/01/2015; 7:00 pm		at Montana	L 48–66	5–7 (0–1)	Dahlberg Arena (2,950); Missoula, MT
01/03/2015; 2:30 pm		at Montana State	W 62–54	6–7 (1–1)	Worthington Arena (1,347); Bozeman, MT
01/08/2015; 7:00 pm		Portland State	W 90–85	7–7 (2–1)	Bank of Colorado Arena (630); Greeley, CO
01/10/2015; 7:00 pm		Sacramento State	W 84–73	8–7 (3–1)	Bank of Colorado Arena (1,275); Greeley, CO
01/17/2015; 2:00 pm		at North Dakota	W 88–78 ^{OT}	9–7 (4–1)	Betty Engelstad Sioux Center (2,321); Grand Forks, ND
01/22/2015; 6:00 pm		at Eastern Washington	L 85–95	9–8 (4–2)	Reese Court (1,267); Cheney, WA
01/24/2015; 7:00 pm		at Idaho	L 79–83	9–9 (4–3)	Cowan Spectrum (N/A); Moscow, ID
01/29/2015; 7:00 pm		Idaho State	W 79–76	10–9 (5–3)	Bank of Colorado Arena (1,617); Greeley, CO
01/31/2015; 7:00 pm		Weber State	W 71–57	11–9 (6–3)	Bank of Colorado Arena (2,178); Greeley, CO
02/05/2015; 7:00 pm		at Northern Arizona	L 60–65	11–10 (6–4)	Walkup Skydome (1,032); Fkagstaff
02/07/2015; 2:00 pm		at Southern Utah	W 84–80	12–10 (7–4)	Centrum Arena (1,629); Cedar City, UT
02/12/2015; 7:00 pm		Montana State	L 87–90	12–11 (7–5)	Bank of Colorado Arena (1,785); Greeley, CO
02/14/2015; 7:00 pm		Montana	L 81–83 ^{3OT}	12–12 (7–6)	Bank of Colorado Arena (1,121); Greeley, CO
02/19/2015; 7:00 pm		at Sacramento State	L 59–66	12–13 (7–7)	Colberg Court (1,332); Sacramento, CA
02/21/2015; 7:00 pm		at Portland State	L 75–91	12–14 (7–8)	Stott Center (853); Portland, OR
02/26/2015; 7:00 pm		Southern Utah	W 77–67	13–14 (8–8)	Bank of Colorado Arena (1,338); Greeley, CO
02/28/2015; 7:00 pm		Northern Arizona	W 76–74	14–14 (9–8)	Bank of Colorado Arena (1,776); Greeley, CO
03/07/2015; 7:00 pm		North Dakota	W 72–71	15–14 (10–8)	Bank of Colorado Arena (2,019); Greeley, CO
Big Sky tournament
03/12/2015; 5:30 pm		vs. Northern Arizona; Quarterfinals	L 57–63	15–15	Dahlberg Arena; Missoula, MT
*Non-conference game. ^{#}Rankings from AP Poll. (#) Tournament seedings in parentheses. All times are in Mountain Time.
