= 2014–15 Weber State Wildcats men's basketball team =

American college basketball season

2014–15 Weber State Wildcats men's basketball
- Conference: Big Sky Conference
- Record: 13–17 (8–10 Big Sky)
- Head coach: Randy Rahe (9th season)
- Assistant coaches: Eric Duft; Phil Beckner; Garrett Lever
- Home arena: Dee Events Center

2014–15 Big Sky men's basketball standings
	Conf.				Overall
Team	W		L	PCT	W		L	PCT
Montana	14	–	4	.778	20	–	13	.606
Eastern Washington †	14	–	4	.778	26	–	9	.743
Sacramento State	13	–	5	.722	21	–	12	.636
Northern Arizona	13	–	5	.722	23	–	15	.605
Northern Colorado	10	–	8	.556	15	–	15	.500
Portland State	9	–	9	.500	15	–	14	.517
Idaho	8	–	10	.444	13	–	17	.433
Weber State	8	–	10	.444	13	–	17	.433
Southern Utah	7	–	11	.389	10	–	19	.345
North Dakota	4	–	14	.222	8	–	22	.267
Idaho State	4	–	14	.222	7	–	23	.233
Montana State	4	–	14	.222	7	–	23	.233
† Conference tournament winner

The 2014–15 Weber State Wildcats men's basketball team represented Weber State University during the 2014–15 NCAA Division I men's basketball season. The Wildcats were led by ninth year head coach Randy Rahe and played their home games at the Dee Events Center. They were members of the Big Sky Conference. They finished the season 13–17, 8–10 in Big Sky play to finish in a tie for seventh place. They lost in the quarterfinals of the Big Sky tournament to Montana.

== Roster ==
Number	Name	Position	Height	Weight	Year	Hometown
0	Jordan Brown	Guard	6–1	180	Junior	Powell, Wyoming
2	Jaelyn Johnson-Coston	Forward	6–6	210	Junior	The Bronx, New York
3	Hayden Hunter	Guard	5–11	160	Freshman	North Richland Hills, Texas
15	Jeremiah Jefferson	Guard	6–2	160	Freshman	Dallas, Texas
21	Joel Bolomboy	Center	6–9	225	Junior	Fort Worth, Texas
22	Ryan Richardson	Guard	6–4	170	Freshman	Mesa, Arizona
23	Richaud Gittens	Guard	6–4	185	Sophomore	Tempe, Arizona
24	J.C. Kennedy	Forward/Guard	6–4	160	Freshman	Nampa, Idaho
30	Jeremy Senglin	Guard	6–2	185	Sophomore	Arlington, Texas
35	Kyndahl Hill	Forward	6–7	210	Sophomore	Humble, Texas
44	Zach Braxton	Forward/Center	6–9	240	Freshman	Highlands Ranch, Colorado
45	James Hajek	Center	6–10	250	Senior	Omaha, Nebraska
50	Ryan Van Pelt	Center	6–11	220	Freshman	Lindon, Utah

== Schedule ==
Date time, TV	Opponent	Result	Record	Site (attendance) city, state
Exhibition
11/01/2014*; 7:00 pm	St. Katherine	W 80–57		Dee Events Center; Ogden, UT
11/08/2014*; 2:00 pm	Western State	W 78–63		Dee Events Center; Ogden, UT
Regular season
11/14/2014*; 7:00 pm	at Utah State	L 61–72	0–1	Smith Spectrum (9,982); Logan, UT
11/17/2014*; 7:30 pm	Presentation	W 74–49	1–1	Dee Events Center (5,453); Ogden, UT
11/21/2014*; 7:00 pm	vs. Illinois State; USVI Paradise Jam	L 64–73	1–2	Sports and Fitness Center (1,910); Saint Thomas, USVI
11/22/2014*; 3:00 pm	vs. LSU; USVI Paradise Jam	L 58–72	1–3	Sports and Fitness Center (1,968); Saint Thomas, USVI
11/24/2014*; 11:30 am	vs. Nevada; USVI Paradise Jam	W 59–56	2–3	Sports and Fitness Center (1,342); Saint Thomas, USVI
12/01/2014*; 7:00 pm	Oral Roberts	W 62–61	3–3	Dee Events Center (5,633); Ogden, UT
12/06/2014*; 1:00 pm	at Texas–Arlington	L 56–63	3–4	College Park Center (1,524); Arlington, TX
12/13/2014*; 7:00 pm, KJZZ	BYU	L 60–76	3–5	Dee Events Center (10,122); Ogden, UT
12/20/2014*; 7:00 pm, KJZZ	Utah Valley	W 73–61	4–5	Dee Events Center (6,803); Ogden, UT
12/22/2014*; 6:00 pm, ROOT	at No. 19 Oklahoma	L 51–85	4–6	Lloyd Noble Center (10,645); Norman, OK
12/27/2014*; 7:00 pm	Bristol University	W 109–59	5–6	Dee Events Center (6,322); Ogden, UT
01/01/2015; 3:00 pm	at Eastern Washington	L 78–84	5–7 (0–1)	Reese Court (1,832); Cheney, WA
01/03/2015; 8:00 pm, SWX	at Idaho	L 84–86	5–8 (0–2)	Cowan Spectrum (801); Moscow, ID
01/08/2015; 7:00 pm	Montana	W 68–60	6–8 (1–2)	Dee Events Center (6,508); Ogden, UT
01/10/2015; 7:00 pm	Montana State	W 65–62	7–8 (2–2)	Dee Events Center (6,721); Ogden, UT
01/15/2015; 6:30 pm, FS AZ	at Northern Arizona	W 74–65	8–8 (3–2)	Walkup Skydome (2,603); Flagstaff, AZ
01/17/2015; 7:00 pm	at Southern Utah	L 60–70	8–9 (3–3)	Centrum Arena (1,842); Cedar City, UT
01/22/2015; 7:00 pm	Portland State	L 63–69	8–10 (3–4)	Dee Events Center (7,162); Ogden, UT
01/24/2015; 7:00 pm	Sacramento State	L 71–78	8–11 (3–5)	Dee Events Center (7,880); Ogden, UT
01/29/2015; 6:00 pm, FS North	at North Dakota	W 67–60	9–11 (4–5)	Betty Engelstad Sioux Center (1,751); Grand Forks, ND
01/31/2015; 7:00 pm	at Northern Colorado	L 57–71	9–12 (4–6)	Bank of Colorado Arena (2,178); Greeley, CO
02/07/2015; 7:00 pm	at Idaho State	W 70–63	10–12 (5–6)	Holt Arena (1,892); Pocatello, ID
02/12/2015; 7:00 pm	Southern Utah	L 56–65	10–13 (5–7)	Dee Events Center (7,113); Ogden, UT
02/14/2015; 7:00 pm	Northern Arizona	L 54–61	10–14 (5–8)	Dee Events Center (6,192); Ogden, UT
02/19/2015; 7:00 pm	at Montana State	W 74–71	11–14 (6–8)	Worthington Arena (1,613); Bozeman, MT
02/21/2015; 7:00 pm, KMYU	at Montana	L 63–74	11–15 (6–9)	Dahlberg Arena (4,416); Missoula, MT
02/28/2015; 7:00 pm, KJZZ	Idaho State	W 61–57	12–15 (7–9)	Dee Events Center (6,325); Ogden, UT
03/05/2015; 7:00 pm	Idaho	W 74–63	13–15 (8–9)	Dee Events Center (6,260); Ogden, UT
03/07/2015; 7:00 pm	Eastern Washington	L 71–79 ^{OT}	13–16 (8–10)	Dee Events Center (7,107); Ogden, UT
Big Sky tournament
03/12/2015; 7:00 pm	at Montana; Quarterfinals	L 73–76 ^{OT}	13–17	Dahlberg Arena (3,938); Missoula, MT
*Non-conference game. ^{#}Rankings from AP Poll. (#) Tournament seedings in parentheses. All times are in Mountain Time.
