= 2014–15 Portland State Vikings men's basketball team =

American college basketball season

2014–15 Portland State Vikings men's basketball
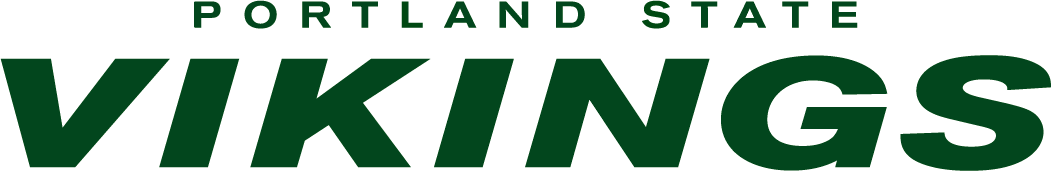
- Conference: Big Sky Conference
- Record: 15–14 (9–9 Big Sky)
- Head coach: Tyler Geving (6th season)
- Assistant coaches: Jeff Hironaka; Jase Coburn; Michael Plank
- Home arena: Peter Stott Center

2014–15 Big Sky men's basketball standings
	Conf.				Overall
Team	W		L	PCT	W		L	PCT
Montana	14	–	4	.778	20	–	13	.606
Eastern Washington †	14	–	4	.778	26	–	9	.743
Sacramento State	13	–	5	.722	21	–	12	.636
Northern Arizona	13	–	5	.722	23	–	15	.605
Northern Colorado	10	–	8	.556	15	–	15	.500
Portland State	9	–	9	.500	15	–	14	.517
Idaho	8	–	10	.444	13	–	17	.433
Weber State	8	–	10	.444	13	–	17	.433
Southern Utah	7	–	11	.389	10	–	19	.345
North Dakota	4	–	14	.222	8	–	22	.267
Idaho State	4	–	14	.222	7	–	23	.233
Montana State	4	–	14	.222	7	–	23	.233
† Conference tournament winner

The 2014–15 Portland State Vikings men's basketball team represented Portland State University during the 2014–15 NCAA Division I men's basketball season. The Vikings, led by sixth-year head coach Tyler Geving, played their home games at the Peter Stott Center in Portland, Oregon and were members of the Big Sky Conference. They finished the season 15–14, 9–9 in Big Sky play, to finish in sixth place. They lost in the quarterfinals of the Big Sky tournament to Sacramento State.

== Roster ==
Number	Name	Position	Height	Weight	Year	Hometown
0	Gary Winston	Guard	6' 0"	190	Senior	Walla Walla, WA
1	Zach Gengler	Guard	6' 2"	180	Sophomore	Silverton, OR
2	Collin Spickerman	Forward	6' 8"	220	Junior	Portland, OR
3	Bryce White	Guard	6' 5"	200	Sophomore	Portland, OR
4	Braxton Tucker	Forward	6' 6"	220	Sophomore	Tacoma, WA
5	Montie Leunen	Forward	6' 4"	190	Freshman	Portland, OR
10	Iziahiah Sweeney	Guard	6' 3"	170	Freshman	Compton, CA
11	Tim Douglas	Guard	5' 10"	160	Senior	Cerritos, CA
12	Kyler Shula	Guard	5' 10"	170	Junior	Puyallup, WA
13	Tiegbe Bamba	Forward	6' 10"	205	Senior	Sarcelles, France
20	Daniel Davydov	Guard	6' 0"	175	Freshman	Bellevue, WA
23	DaShaun Wiggins	Guard	6' 2"	190	Senior	The Bronx, NY
30	Sebastian Suarez	Guard	6' 4"	210	Senior	Ancud, Chile
34	Joel King	Guard	6' 3"	185	Senior	Lacey, WA
42	Dorian Cason	Center	6' 7"	250	Junior	Fontana, CA
44	Brandon Cataldo	Center	6' 10"	285	Senior	Rainier, OR
	Calaen Robinson	Guard	6' 2"	190	Junior	Tempe, AZ

== Schedule ==
Date time, TV	Rank^{#}	Opponent^{#}	Result	Record	Site (attendance) city, state
Exhibition
November 8, 2014*; 7:30 p.m.		Linfield	W 88–43		Stott Center (1,039); Portland, OR
Regular season
November 15, 2014*; 7:30 p.m., P12N		at USC	W 76–68	1–0	Galen Center (2,811); Los Angeles, CA
November 18, 2014*; 7:00 p.m.		Willamette	W 84–63	2–0	Stott Center (633); Portland, OR
November 24, 2014*; 7:00 p.m.		SIU Edwardsville	W 90–87 ^{OT}	3–0	Stott Center (582); Portland, OR
November 26, 2014*; 8:00 p.m.		at Cal State Northridge	W 63–55	4–0	Matadome (555); Northridge, CA
November 30, 2014*; 5:00 p.m., P12N		at Oregon	L 59–81	4–1	Matthew Knight Arena (5,040); Eugene, OR
December 3, 2014*; 7:00 p.m.		at Portland	L 71–83	4–2	Chiles Center (1,494); Portland, OR
December 6, 2014*; 5:00 p.m.		at UC Riverside	L 62–88	4–3	UC Riverside Student Recreation Center (582); Riverside, CA
December 13, 2014*; 1:00 p.m.		Cal State Bakersfield	W 65–59	5–3	Stott Center (493); Portland, OR
December 18, 2014*; 7:00 p.m.		at San Francisco	L 40–77	5–4	War Memorial Gymnasium (1,464); San Francisco, CA
December 22, 2014*; 6:00 p.m.		Walla Walla	W 94–52	6–4	Stott Center (410); Portland, OR
January 1, 2015; 7:00 p.m.		Southern Utah	W 71–68	7–4 (1–0)	Stott Center (330); Portland, OR
January 3, 2015; 7:00 p.m.		Northern Arizona	L 60–73	7–5 (1–1)	Stott Center (498); Portland, OR
January 8, 2015; 6:00 p.m.		at Northern Colorado	L 85–90	7–6 (1–2)	Bank of Colorado Arena (630); Greeley, CO
January 10, 2015; 12:00 p.m.		at North Dakota	W 82–75	8–6 (2–2)	Betty Engelstad Sioux Center (1,590); Grand Forks, ND
January 15, 2015; 7:00 p.m.		Eastern Washington	L 85–92	8–7 (2–3)	Stott Center (590); Portland, OR
January 17, 2015; 7:00 p.m.		Idaho	W 85–73	9–7 (3–3)	Stott Center (978); Portland, OR
January 22, 2015; 6:00 p.m.		at Weber State	W 69–63	10–7 (4–3)	Dee Events Center (7,162); Ogden, UT
January 24, 2015; 6:00 p.m.		at Idaho State	L 76–80	10–8 (4–4)	Reed Gym (1,763); Pocatello, ID
January 29, 2015; 7:00 p.m.		Montana	L 54–73	10–9 (4–5)	Stott Center (953); Portland, OR
January 31, 2015; 7:00 p.m.		Montana State	W 80–62	11–9 (5–5)	Stott Center (876); Portland, OR
February 7, 2015; 7:00 p.m.		at Sacramento State	L 60–64	11–10 (5–6)	Colberg Court (1,145); Sacramento, CA
February 12, 2015; 7:00 p.m.		at Idaho	L 76–87	11–11 (5–7)	Cowan Spectrum (1,232); Moscow, ID
February 14, 2015; 2:00 p.m.		at Eastern Washington	W 68–66	12–11 (6–7)	Reese Court (2,023); Cheney, WA
February 19, 2015; 7:00 p.m.		North Dakota	L 70–80	13–11 (7–7)	Stott Center (817); Portland, OR
February 21, 2015; 7:00 p.m.		Northern Colorado	W 91–75	14–11 (8–7)	Stott Center (853); Portland, OR
February 28, 2015; 7:00 p.m.		Sacramento State	L 60–73	14–12 (8–8)	Stott Center (1,500); Portland, OR
March 5, 2015; 5:30 p.m.		at Northern Arizona	L 51–58	14–13 (8–9)	Walkup Skydome (1,146); Flagstaff, AZ
March 7, 2015; 6:00 p.m.		at Southern Utah	W 86–73	15–13 (9–9)	Centrum Arena (1,717); Cedar City, UT
Big Sky tournament
March 12, 2015; 12:30 p.m.		vs. Sacramento State; Quarterfinals	L 60–70	15–14	Dahlberg Arena (2,239); Missoula, MT
*Non-conference game. ^{#}Rankings from AP poll. (#) Tournament seedings in parentheses. All times are in Pacific.

== See also ==
- 2014–15 Portland State Vikings women's basketball team
