= 2014–15 Sacramento State Hornets men's basketball team =

American college basketball season

2014–15 Sacramento State Hornets men's basketball

CIT, Second round
- Conference: Big Sky Conference
- Record: 21–12 (13–5 Big Sky)
- Head coach: Brian Katz (7th season)
- Assistant coaches: Brandon Laird; Ajay Riding; Chris Walker
- Home arena: Hornets Nest

2014–15 Big Sky men's basketball standings
	Conf.				Overall
Team	W		L	PCT	W		L	PCT
Montana	14	–	4	.778	20	–	13	.606
Eastern Washington †	14	–	4	.778	26	–	9	.743
Sacramento State	13	–	5	.722	21	–	12	.636
Northern Arizona	13	–	5	.722	23	–	15	.605
Northern Colorado	10	–	8	.556	15	–	15	.500
Portland State	9	–	9	.500	15	–	14	.517
Idaho	8	–	10	.444	13	–	17	.433
Weber State	8	–	10	.444	13	–	17	.433
Southern Utah	7	–	11	.389	10	–	19	.345
North Dakota	4	–	14	.222	8	–	22	.267
Idaho State	4	–	14	.222	7	–	23	.233
Montana State	4	–	14	.222	7	–	23	.233
† Conference tournament winner

The 2014–15 Sacramento State Hornets men's basketball team represented California State University, Sacramento during the 2014–15 NCAA Division I men's basketball season. The Hornets were led by seventh year head coach Brian Katz and played their home games at Hornets Nest. They were members of the Big Sky Conference. They finished the season 21–12, 13–5 in Big Sky play to finish in a tie for third place. They advanced to the semifinals of the Big Sky tournament where they lost to Eastern Washington. They were invited to the CollegeInsider.com Tournament where they defeated Portland in the first round before losing in the second round to fellow Big Sky member Northern Arizona.

== Roster ==
Number	Name	Position	Height	Weight	Year	Hometown
0	Marcus Graves	Guard	6–0	180	Freshman	San Diego, California
1	Dreon Barlett	Guard	6–3	185	Junior	Huntington Beach, California
2	Cody Demps	Guard	6–4	200	Junior	Elk Grove, California
4	Jiday Ugbaja	Guard	5–11	185	Freshman	San Francisco, California
5	Dylan Garrity	Guard	6–2	185	Senior	Huntington Beach, California
10	Mikh McKinney	Guard	6–1	170	Senior	Union City, California
11	Trevis Jackson	Guard	5–11	165	Sophomore	Santa Monica, California
20	Zach Mills	Forward	6–5	215	Senior	Yorba Linda, California
21	Mason Stuteville	Forward	6–11	230	Freshman	Orangevale, California
33	Nick Hornsby	Guard/Forward	6–7	220	Sophomore	Irvine, California
34	Alex Tiffin	Forward	6–9	235	Senior	Thousand Oaks, California
44	Eric Stuteville	Center	6–11	250	Sophomore	Orangevale, California
50	James Herrick	Center	6–9	240	Freshman	Minden, Nevada

== Schedule ==
Date time, TV	Opponent	Result	Record	Site (attendance) city, state
Exhibition season
11/04/2014*; 7:00 pm	Holy Names	W 68–45		Hornets Nest (427); Sacramento, CA
11/07/2014*; 7:00 pm	Menlo	W 77–68		Hornets Nest (381); Sacramento, CA
Regular season
11/14/2014*; 6:00 pm, RTNW	at No. 13 Gonzaga	L 58–104	0–1	McCarthey Athletic Center (6,000); Spokane, WA
11/17/2014*; 7:00 pm	at UC Riverside	W 70–69	1–1	UC Riverside Student Recreation Center (580); Riverside, CA
11/19/2014*; 7:00 pm	Simpson	W 74–42	2–1	Hornets Nest (433); Sacramento, CA
11/25/2014*; 7:00 pm	Bristol	W 97–63	3–1	Hornets Nest (483); Sacramento, CA
12/01/2014*; 7:00 pm	Utah Valley	W 65–56	4–1	Hornets Nest (383); Sacramento, CA
12/04/2014*; 5:00 pm	at Abilene Christian	L 61–72	4–2	Moody Coliseum (2,215); Abilene, TX
12/06/2014*; 7:00 pm	at UC Irvine	L 62–74	4–3	Bren Events Center (2,259); Irvine, CA
12/11/2014*; 7:00 pm	Cal State Fullerton	W 73–59	5–3	Hornets Nest (436); Sacramento, CA
12/14/2014*; 5:00 pm	Portland	L 75–80	5–4	Hornets Nest (685); Sacramento, CA
12/21/2014*; 7:00 pm	at Seattle	L 47–66	5–5	KeyArena (1,599); Seattle, WA
12/27/2014*; 6:00 pm	at Utah Valley	W 74–49	6–5	UCCU Center (932); Orem, UT
01/01/2015; 7:00 pm	Northern Arizona	W 78–73	7–5 (1–0)	Hornets Nest (508); Sacramento, CA
01/03/2015; 7:00 pm	Southern Utah	W 90–75	8–5 (2–0)	Hornets Nest (545); Sacramento, CA
01/08/2015; 5:00 pm	at North Dakota	W 63–61	9–5 (3–0)	Betty Engelstad Sioux Center (1,372); Grand Forks, ND
01/10/2015; 6:00 pm	at Northern Colorado	L 73–84	9–6 (3–1)	Bank of Colorado Arena (1,275); Greeley, CO
01/15/2015; 7:00 pm	Idaho	W 79–76	10–6 (4–1)	Hornets Nest (702); Sacramento, CA
01/17/2015; 7:00 pm	Eastern Washington	W 90–77	11–6 (5–1)	Hornets Nest (902); Sacramento, CA
01/22/2015; 6:00 pm	at Idaho State	W 62–59	12–6 (6–1)	Reed Gym (1,500); Pocatello, ID
01/24/2015; 6:00 pm	at Weber State	W 78–71	13–6 (7–1)	Dee Events Center (7,880); Ogden, UT
01/29/2015; 7:00 pm	Montana State	W 75–59	14–6 (8–1)	Hornets Nest (1,215); Sacramento, CA
01/31/2015; 7:00 pm	Montana	W 70–69	15–6 (9–1)	Hornets Nest (1,407); Sacramento, CA
02/07/2015; 7:00 pm	Portland State	W 64–60	16–6 (10–1)	Hornets Nest (1,145); Sacramento, CA
02/12/2015; 6:00 pm	at Eastern Washington	L 61–64	16–7 (10–2)	Reese Court (3,114); Cheney, WA
02/14/2015; 7:00 pm	at Idaho	L 58–69	16–8 (10–3)	Cowan Spectrum (1,858); Moscow, ID
02/19/2015; 7:00 pm	Northern Colorado	W 66–59	17–8 (11–3)	Hornets Nest (1,332); Sacramento, CA
02/21/2015; 7:00 pm	North Dakota	W 74–66	18–8 (12–3)	Hornets Nest (1,231); Sacramento, CA
02/28/2015; 7:00 pm	at Portland State	W 73–60	19–8 (13–3)	Stott Center (1,500); Portland, OR
03/05/2015; 6:00 pm	at Southern Utah	L 65–69	19–9 (13–4)	Centrum Arena (1,780); Cedar City, UT
03/07/2015; 1:00 pm	at Northern Arizona	L 68–70	19–10 (13–5)	Walkup Skydome (1,581); Flagstaff
Big Sky tournament
03/12/2015; 12:30 pm	vs. Portland State; Quarterfinals	W 70–60	20–10	Dahlberg Arena (2,239); Missoula, MT
03/13/2015; 4:30 pm	vs. Eastern Washington; Semifinals	L 83–91	20–11	Dahlberg Arena (5,009); Missoula, MT
CIT
03/18/2015*; 7:00 pm	at Portland; First round	W 73–66	21–11	Chiles Center (1,013); Portland, OR
03/21/2015*; 7:00 pm	Northern Arizona; Second round	L 73–78	21–12	Hornets Nest (1,137); Sacramento, CA
*Non-conference game. ^{#}Rankings from AP Poll. (#) Tournament seedings in parentheses. All times are in Pacific Time.

== See also ==
2014–15 Sacramento State Hornets women's basketball team
