= 2014–15 Eastern Washington Eagles men's basketball team =

American college basketball season

2014–15 Eastern Washington Eagles men's basketball

Big Sky regular season co–champions Big Sky tournament champions

NCAA tournament, round of 64
- Conference: Big Sky Conference
- Record: 26–9 (14–4 Big Sky)
- Head coach: Jim Hayford (4th season)
- Assistant coaches: Shantay Legans; Alex Pribble; David Riley
- Home arena: Reese Court

2014–15 Big Sky men's basketball standings
	Conf.				Overall
Team	W		L	PCT	W		L	PCT
Montana	14	–	4	.778	20	–	13	.606
Eastern Washington †	14	–	4	.778	26	–	9	.743
Sacramento State	13	–	5	.722	21	–	12	.636
Northern Arizona	13	–	5	.722	23	–	15	.605
Northern Colorado	10	–	8	.556	15	–	15	.500
Portland State	9	–	9	.500	15	–	14	.517
Idaho	8	–	10	.444	13	–	17	.433
Weber State	8	–	10	.444	13	–	17	.433
Southern Utah	7	–	11	.389	10	–	19	.345
North Dakota	4	–	14	.222	8	–	22	.267
Idaho State	4	–	14	.222	7	–	23	.233
Montana State	4	–	14	.222	7	–	23	.233
† Conference tournament winner

The 2014–15 Eastern Washington Eagles men's basketball team represented Eastern Washington University during the 2014–15 NCAA Division I men's basketball season. The Eagles were led by fourth year head coach Jim Hayford and played their home games at Reese Court. They were members of the Big Sky Conference. They finished the season 26–9, 14–4 in Big Sky play to finish in a share for the regular season Big Sky championship. They defeated Idaho, Sacramento State, and Montana to be champions of the Big Sky tournament. They received an automatic bid to the NCAA tournament where they lost in the second round to Georgetown.

== Roster ==
2014–15 Eastern Washington Eagles men's basketball team
Players
Coaches

Pos.	#	Name	Height	Weight	Year	Previous school	Hometown
F	0	Ognjen Miljkovic	6 ft 7 in (2.01 m)	220 lb (100 kg)	So	Bishop Montgomery HS	Belgrade, Serbia
G	1	Tyler Harvey (C)	6 ft 4 in (1.93 m)	185 lb (84 kg)	RS Jr	Bishop Montgomery HS	Torrance, California
G	2	Daniel Hill	5 ft 9 in (1.75 m)	165 lb (75 kg)	Jr	Newington College	Sydney, Australia
G	4	Sir Washington	6 ft 3 in (1.91 m)	180 lb (82 kg)	RS Fr	Clark HS	Las Vegas, Nevada
G	5	Nate Galago	5 ft 10 in (1.78 m)	175 lb (79 kg)	RS So	Ferris HS	Spokane, Washington
G	10	Parker Kelly (C)	6 ft 4 in (1.93 m)	195 lb (88 kg)	Sr	Gonzaga Prep	Spokane, Washington
F	11	Bear Henderson	6 ft 6 in (1.98 m)	215 lb (98 kg)	Fr	Village Christian HS	Mission Hills, California
G	15	Will Ferris (redshirt)	6 ft 1 in (1.85 m)	175 lb (79 kg)	Fr	Newport HS	Bellevue, Washington
G	20	Cody Benzel (redshirt)	6 ft 4 in (1.93 m)	175 lb (79 kg)	Fr	Ferris HS	Spokane, Washington
C	21	Frederik Jörg	7 ft 1 in (2.16 m)	295 lb (134 kg)	RS So	Gymnasium Eversten HS	Korschenbroich, Germany
G	22	Drew Brandon	6 ft 4 in (1.93 m)	185 lb (84 kg)	RS Sr	Santiago HS/Sierra College	Corona, California
F	23	Kyle Reid	6 ft 8 in (2.03 m)	215 lb (98 kg)	RS Jr	Bishop Montgomery HS/Los Angeles Trade Tech	Cleveland, Ohio
F	32	Bogdan Bliznyuk	6 ft 6 in (1.98 m)	215 lb (98 kg)	Fr	Todd Beamer HS	Lutsk, Ukraine
F	33	Garrett Moon	6 ft 5 in (1.96 m)	190 lb (86 kg)	RS Sr	Wallenberg HS/City College of San Francisco	San Francisco, California
F	44	Felix Von Hofe	6 ft 5 in (1.96 m)	200 lb (91 kg)	So	Wesley College/Australian Institute of Sport	Melbourne, Australia
F	55	Venky Jois (C)	6 ft 8 in (2.03 m)	230 lb (104 kg)	Jr	Box Hill HS	Boronia, Australia

Head coach

- Jim Hayford (Azusa Pacific)

Assistant coach(es)

- Shantay Legans (Fresno State)
- Alex Pribble (California)
- David Riley (Whitworth)

Strength and conditioning coach(es)

- Amir Owens (Idaho State)

Athletic trainer(s)

- Kristin Barnett (Kansas)

Legend

- (C) Team captain
- (S) Suspended
- (I) Ineligible
- (W) Walk-on
- Injured
- Current redshirt

Roster
Last update: 17 March 2015

== Schedule ==
Date time, TV	Rank^{#}	Opponent^{#}	Result	Record	Site (attendance) city, state
Exhibition
11/09/2014*; 2:00 pm		Puget Sound	W 89–55		Reese Court (456); Cheney, WA
Regular season
11/14/2014*; 8:00 am		Texas Southern; Hoosiers Showcase	W 86–62	1–0	Reese Court (1,623); Cheney, WA
11/17/2014*; 5:00 pm		Utah Valley	W 75–50	2–0	Reese Court (1,155); Cheney, WA
11/19/2014*; 6:00 pm		Walla Walla	W 95–34	3–0	Reese Court (821); Cheney, WA
11/22/2014*; 4:00 pm, ESPN3		at No. 22 SMU; Hoosiers Showcase	L 68–77	3–1	Moody Coliseum (6,852); University Park, TX
11/24/2014*; 4:30 pm, ESPNews		at Indiana; Hoosiers Showcase	W 88–86	4–1	Assembly Hall (11,636); Bloomington, IN
11/26/2014*; 6:00 pm		Northern Kentucky	W 81–60	5–1	Reese Court (1,003); Cheney, WA
11/30/2014*; 2:00 pm		Eastern Oregon	W 104–87	6–1	Reese Court (1,017); Cheney, WA
12/06/2014*; 7:00 pm		at Seattle	W 87–75	7–1	KeyArena (3,417); Seattle, WA
12/11/2014*; 7:00 pm		at San Francisco	W 81–76	8–1	War Memorial Gymnasium (1,351); San Francisco, CA
12/14/2014*; 5:00 pm, P12N		at No. 17 Washington	L 77–81	8–2	Alaska Airlines Arena (6,184); Seattle, WA
12/16/2014*; 4:30 pm		at Sam Houston State	L 52–76	8–3	Bernard Johnson Coliseum (661); Huntsville, TX
12/19/2014*; 7:00 pm, P12N		at California	L 67–78	8–4	Haas Pavilion (6,758); Berkeley, CA
12/22/2014*; 6:00 pm		Lewis–Clark State	W 87–81	9–4	Reese Court (1,367); Cheney, WA
01/01/2015; 2:00 pm		Weber State	W 84–78	10–4 (1–0)	Reese Court (1,832); Cheney, WA
01/03/2015; 2:00 pm		Idaho State	W 65–57	11–4 (2–0)	Reese Court ( 1,684); Cheney, WA
01/10/2015; 7:00 pm		at Idaho	W 89–86	12–4 (3–0)	Cowan Spectrum (1,321); Moscow, ID
01/15/2015; 7:00 pm		at Portland State; The Dam Cup	W 92–85	13–4 (4–0)	Stott Center (590); Portland, OR
01/17/2015; 7:00 pm		at Sacramento State	L 77–90	13–5 (4–1)	Colberg Court (902); Sacramento, CA
01/22/2015; 6:00 pm		Northern Colorado	W 95–85	14–5 (5–1)	Reese Court (1,267); Cheney, WA
01/24/2015; 2:00 pm		North Dakota	W 102–80	15–5 (6–1)	Reese Court (2,097); Cheney, WA
01/31/2015; 2:00 pm, SWX		Idaho	W 98–95 ^{OT}	16–5 (7–1)	Reese Court (3,017); Cheney, WA
02/05/2015; 6:00 pm		at Montana	W 75–69	17–5 (8–1)	Dahlberg Arena (3,930); Missoula, MT
02/07/2015; 1:30 pm		at Montana State	W 61–51	18–5 (9–1)	Worthington Arena (1,667); Bozeman, MT
02/12/2015; 6:00 pm		Sacramento State	W 64–61	19–5 (10–1)	Reese Court (3,114); Cheney, WA
02/14/2015; 2:00 pm, SWX		Portland State; The Dam Cup	L 66–68	19–6 (10–2)	Reese Court (2,023); Cheney, WA
02/19/2015; 6:00 pm		at Southern Utah	W 78–75	20–6 (11–2)	Centrum Arena (1,111); Cedar City, UT
02/21/2015; 1:00 pm		at Northern Arizona	L 69–73	20–7 (11–3)	Walkup Skydome (2,261); Flagstaff, AZ
02/26/2015; 6:00 pm		Montana State	W 92–68	21–7 (12–3)	Reese Court (2,226); Cheney, WA
02/28/2015; 2:00 pm, SWX		Montana	L 76–77	21–8 (12–4)	Reese Court (4,621); Cheney, WA
03/05/2015; 6:00 pm		at Idaho State	W 85–81	22–8 (13–4)	Holt Arena (1,474); Pocatello, ID
03/07/2015; 6:00 pm		at Weber State	W 79–71 ^{OT}	23–8 (14–4)	Dee Events Center (7,107); Ogden, UT
Big Sky tournament
03/12/2015; 11:00 am		vs. Idaho; Quarterfinals	W 91–83	24–8	Dahlberg Arena (2,239); Missoula, MT
03/13/2015; 5:35 pm		vs. Sacramento State; Semifinals	W 91–83	25–8	Dahlberg Arena (5,009); Missoula, MT
03/14/2015; 6:05 pm, ESPNU		at Montana; Championship game	W 69–65	26–8	Dahlberg Arena (7,026); Missoula, MT
NCAA tournament
03/19/2015*; 6:57 pm, truTV	(S 13)	vs. (S 4) No. 22 Georgetown; Second round	L 74–84	26–9	Moda Center (14,279); Portland, OR
*Non-conference game. ^{#}Rankings from AP Poll. (#) Tournament seedings in parentheses. S=South Region. All times are in Pacific Time.

== See also ==
2014–15 Eastern Washington Eagles women's basketball team
