= Newark Days =

Coordinates: 37.548831°N 122.041004°W

Newark Days is an annual celebration that takes place in Newark, California every September to celebrate the incorporation of the city of Newark on September 22, 1955. In its current form it is a four-day event, Thursday through Sunday, in mid to late September. It is centered on Newark Community Park & Community Center as well as the adjacent MacGregor School Grounds. In addition to carnival rides, food and game booths, and stage shows, it includes a race and a parade along "the Newark Mile" (a stretch of Newark Blvd.) on the Saturday morning. Annual attendance for the celebration is more than 100,000.

== History ==
What is now called Newark Days was originally planned by members of the Newark Chamber of Commerce. They later turned the festivities over to the Jaycees. In the 1960s a group called "Newark Birthday Celebration" was formed. However, the event was not put on during the late 1960s.

In 1972, Shirley Sisk called a meeting to see if there were enough volunteers to plan an event for that September. Interest was high, and "Newark Days Celebration" was formed. The Newark Rotary club brought in a carnival, and the committee put together food booths and games at the Pavilion. The weekend was a huge success, and a nonprofit corporation (Newark Days Celebration, Inc.) was formed to make it a regular annual event. Newark Days Celebration, Inc. has continued to organize the event with a fully volunteer executive board and committee of approximately 30 members that work year-round, with more than 100 additional volunteers that join to assist at the event itself.

In 2005, Newark Days celebrated Newark's 50th anniversary with a 1950s theme and the return of Arknew, a kangaroo that was Newark's old town mascot.

The festival was held virtually in 2020 due to concerns around COVID-19. The 2021 celebration was cancelled just weeks before the event due to increasing infection numbers from the COVID Delta variant. Newark Days returned in 2022 with a full in-person festival.

== Themes ==
The celebration has a theme that is determined every year, which influences the feel of the event through items such as decorations, t-shirt design, and tailored parade entries. The following have been the Newark Days themes:

- 1988 Every Day's a Holiday
- 1989 People, Pride & Progress
- 1990 The Magic of Newark
- 1991 Newark Then & Now
- 1992 Where Fairy Tales Come True
- 1993 Railroad Days
- 1994 The Best of the West
- 1995 Remembering When
- 1996 There's No Place Like Home
- 1997 It's a Small World
- 1998 Under the Big Top
- 1999 Every Day's a Holiday
- 2000 The Sounds of Music
- 2001 Newarks of the World
- 2002 Celebrate America
- 2003 Every Day's a Holiday
- 2004 Exploring the West
- 2005 50 Golden Years
- 2006 It's all Here
- 2007 Cirque de Newark
- 2008 Celebrate America
- 2009 Celebrating the Arts
- 2010 Color the World
- 2011 Fantasy Comes Alive
- 2012 Country Jamboree
- 2013 All That Jazz
- 2014 Be a Kid Again
- 2015 Set Sail for Newark
- 2016 Voyage to the Stars
- 2017 A Jungle Adventure
- 2018 It's a Wizard's World
- 2019 Heros Are Super
- 2020 Celebrate Virtually
- 2021 (Cancelled due to COVID Delta Variant)
- 2022 Under the Sea
- 2023 Newark Rocks!
- 2024 Let the Games Begin
- 2025 Celebrating the 70s
- 2026 Adventure is Just a Page Away
