= 2014–15 Idaho Vandals men's basketball team =

American college basketball season

2014–15 Idaho Vandals men's basketball
- Conference: Big Sky Conference
- Record: 13–17 (8–10 Big Sky)
- Head coach: Don Verlin (7th season)
- Assistant coaches: Tim Murphy; Chris Helbling; Kirk Earlywine
- Home arena: Cowan Spectrum, Memorial Gym

2014–15 Big Sky men's basketball standings
	Conf.				Overall
Team	W		L	PCT	W		L	PCT
Montana	14	–	4	.778	20	–	13	.606
Eastern Washington †	14	–	4	.778	26	–	9	.743
Sacramento State	13	–	5	.722	21	–	12	.636
Northern Arizona	13	–	5	.722	23	–	15	.605
Northern Colorado	10	–	8	.556	15	–	15	.500
Portland State	9	–	9	.500	15	–	14	.517
Idaho	8	–	10	.444	13	–	17	.433
Weber State	8	–	10	.444	13	–	17	.433
Southern Utah	7	–	11	.389	10	–	19	.345
North Dakota	4	–	14	.222	8	–	22	.267
Idaho State	4	–	14	.222	7	–	23	.233
Montana State	4	–	14	.222	7	–	23	.233
† Conference tournament winner

The 2014–15 Idaho Vandals men's basketball team represented the University of Idaho during the 2014–15 NCAA Division I men's basketball season. The Vandals, led by seventh year head coach Don Verlin, played their home games at the Cowan Spectrum, with a few early season games at Memorial Gym, and were members of the Big Sky Conference. This was their first year returning to the Big Sky, the conference they were charter members of and called home from 1963–1996. They finished the season 13–17, 8–10 in Big Sky play to finish in a tie for seventh place. They lost in the quarterfinals of the Big Sky tournament to Eastern Washington.

== Roster ==
Number	Name	Position	Height	Weight	Year	Hometown
1	Perrion Callandret	Guard	6–2	180	Sophomore	Bothell, Washington
2	Sekou Wiggs	Guard	6–3	182	Sophomore	Seattle, Washington
3	Jake Straughan	Guard	6–1	175	Freshman	Colton, Washington
5	Connor Hill	Guard	6–3	190	Senior	Post Falls, Idaho
11	Victor Sanders	Guard	6–5	195	Freshman	Portland, Oregon
12	Mike Scott	Guard	6–0	180	Senior	Los Angeles, California
13	Bira Seck	Forward	6–6	215	Senior	Dakar, Senegal
14	Chad Sherwood	Guard	6–2	180	Freshman	Albany, Oregon
15	Paulin Mpawe	Forward	6–10	227	Junior	San Bernardino, California
21	Arkadiy Mkrtuchyan	Forward	6–7	235	Freshman	Portland, Oregon
23	Nate Sherwood	Forward	6–8		Freshman	Albany, Oregon
24	George Nahshon	Forward	6–9	200	Junior	Kapolei, Hawaii
33	Skyler White	Guard	6–6	238	Sophomore	Bellevue, Washington
41	Ty Egbert	Forward	6–9	195	Sophomore	Coulee Dam, Washington
44	Jordan Scott	Forward	6–6	200	Freshman	Colorado Springs, Colorado
50	Roberto Asencio	Center	6–9	245	Junior	Haina, Dominican Republic

== Schedule ==
Date time, TV	Opponent	Result	Record	Site (attendance) city, state
Exhibition
10/31/2014*; 7:00 pm	Simon Fraser	W 139–115		Memorial Gym (531); Moscow, ID
11/07/2014*; 7:00 pm	Lewis–Clark State	W 75–57		Memorial Gym (1,002); Moscow, ID
Regular season
11/14/2014*; 7:00 pm	Eastern Oregon	W 77–65	1–0	Memorial Gym (1,184); Moscow, ID
11/17/2014*; 7:00 pm	South Dakota State	W 82–77	2–0	Memorial Gym (631); Moscow, ID
11/20/2014*; 5:00 pm	at Northern Illinois	L 67–78	2–1	Convocation Center (1,003); DeKalb, IL
11/25/2014*; 6:00 pm, SWX	vs. Boise State	L 75–86	2–2	CenturyLink Arena (5,672); Boise, ID
11/29/2014*; 7:00 pm	Northern Kentucky	L 74–79	2–3	Memorial Gym (227); Moscow, ID
12/03/2014*; 7:00 pm, P12N	at Washington State; Battle of the Palouse	W 77–71	3–3	Beasley Coliseum (2,723); Pullman, WA
12/06/2014*; 2:00 pm	UC Davis	W 79–71	4–3	Cowan Spectrum (1,430); Moscow, ID
12/11/2014*; 5:00 pm	at Western Illinois	L 75–78	4–4	Western Hall (1,053); Macomb, IL
12/13/2014*; 5:00 pm	at South Dakota State	L 85–87	4–5	Frost Arena (2,221); Brookings, SD
12/18/2014*; 7:00 pm	Walla Walla	W 86–39	5–5	Cowan Spectrum (745); Moscow, ID
12/22/2014*; 4:00 pm, ESPN3	at Northern Kentucky	L 68–81	5–6	The Bank of Kentucky Center (1,255); Highland Heights, KY
01/01/2015; 7:00 pm	Idaho State	W 77–54	6–6 (1–0)	Cowan Spectrum (812); Moscow, ID
01/03/2015; 7:00 pm	Weber State	W 86–84	7–6 (2–0)	Cowan Spectrum (801); Moscow, ID
01/10/2015; 7:00 pm	Eastern Washington	L 86–89	7–7 (2–1)	Cowan Spectrum (1,321); Moscow, ID
01/15/2015; 7:00 pm	at Sacramento State	L 76–79	7–8 (2–2)	Colberg Court (702); Sacramento, CA
01/17/2015; 7:00 pm	at Portland State	L 73–85	7–9 (2–3)	Stott Center (978); Portland, OR
01/22/2015; 7:00 pm	North Dakota	L 63–71	7–10 (2–4)	Cowan Spectrum (1,421); Moscow, ID
01/24/2015; 7:00 pm	Northern Colorado	W 83–79	8–10 (3–4)	Cowan Spectrum (N/A); Moscow, ID
01/31/2015; 7:00 pm	at Eastern Washington	L 95–98 ^{OT}	8–11 (3–5)	Reese Court (3,017); Cheney, WA
02/05/2015; 6:00 pm	at Montana State	W 80–71	9–11 (4–5)	Worthington Arena (1,477); Bozeman, MT
02/07/2015; 6:00 pm	at Montana	L 56–70	9–12 (4–6)	Dahlberg Arena (3,861); Missoula, MT
02/12/2015; 7:00 pm	Portland State	W 87–76	10–12 (5–6)	Cowan Spectrum (1,232); Moscow, ID
02/14/2015; 7:00 pm	Sacramento State	W 69–58	11–12 (6–6)	Cowan Spectrum (1,858); Moscow, ID
02/19/2015; 6:00 pm	at Northern Arizona	L 65–72	11–13 (6–7)	Walkup Skydome (1,427); Fkagstaff
02/21/2015; 6:00 pm	at Southern Utah	L 77–79 ^{OT}	11–14 (6–8)	Centrum Arena (1,411); Cedar City, UT
02/26/2015; 7:00 pm	Montana	W 92–87 ^{2OT}	12–14 (7–8)	Cowan Spectrum (1,500); Moscow, ID
02/28/2015; 7:00 pm	Montana State	W 80–73	13–14 (8–8)	Cowan Spectrum (1,500); Moscow, ID
03/05/2015; 6:00 pm	at Weber State	L 63–74	13–15 (8–9)	Dee Events Center (6,260); Ogden, UT
03/07/2015; 6:00 pm	at Idaho State; Rivalry	L 65–67	13–16 (8–10)	Holt Arena (1,964); Pocatello, ID
Big Sky tournament
03/12/2015; 11:00 am	vs. Eastern Washington; Quarterfinals	L 83–91	13–17	Dahlberg Arena (2,239); Missoula, MT
*Non-conference game. ^{#}Rankings from AP Poll. (#) Tournament seedings in parentheses. All times are in Pacific Time.
