= 2015 Big Sky Conference men's basketball tournament =

- Classification: Division I
- Season: 2014–15
- Teams: 8
- Site: Dahlberg Arena; Missoula, Montana
- Champions: Eastern Washington (2nd title)
- Winning coach: Jim Hayford (1st title)
- MVP: Tyler Harvey (Eastern Washington)
- Television: ESPNU (final)

2014–15 Big Sky men's basketball standings
	Conf.				Overall
Team	W		L	PCT	W		L	PCT
Montana	14	–	4	.778	20	–	13	.606
Eastern Washington †	14	–	4	.778	26	–	9	.743
Sacramento State	13	–	5	.722	21	–	12	.636
Northern Arizona	13	–	5	.722	23	–	15	.605
Northern Colorado	10	–	8	.556	15	–	15	.500
Portland State	9	–	9	.500	15	–	14	.517
Idaho	8	–	10	.444	13	–	17	.433
Weber State	8	–	10	.444	13	–	17	.433
Southern Utah	7	–	11	.389	10	–	19	.345
North Dakota	4	–	14	.222	8	–	22	.267
Idaho State	4	–	14	.222	7	–	23	.233
Montana State	4	–	14	.222	7	–	23	.233
† Conference tournament winner

The 2015 Big Sky Conference men's basketball tournament was held March 12–14, 2015. All games were hosted by the Montana Grizzlies, which won a tiebreaker with regular season co-champions Eastern Washington, at Dahlberg Arena. The champion, Eastern Washington, received an automatic bid to the 2015 NCAA tournament.

This was the final Big Sky tournament to be held at a campus site, and also the last one in which certain teams were excluded due to poor performance. From 2016 forward, the tournament would involve all conference members (barring NCAA sanctions), and would be held at a predetermined neutral site, with the first neutral-site tournament to be held at the Reno Events Center in Reno, Nevada.

== Format ==
With the addition of Idaho in all sports except football, the league now has 12 men's and women's basketball programs. The 2015 tournaments expanded from seven to eight teams each, with no byes. Four quarterfinals were played on Thursday, followed by two semifinal games on Friday, and the championship game on Saturday. In addition, the top seed no longer has a bye in the tournament.

== Bracket ==
Quarterfinals; Thursday, March 12; Watch Big Sky
1	Montana	76*
8	Weber State	73
4	Northern Arizona	63
5	Northern Colorado	57
2	Eastern Washington	91
7	Idaho	83
3	Sacramento State	70
6	Portland State	60

Semifinals; Friday, March 13; Watch Big Sky
1	Montana	61
4	Northern Arizona	59
2	Eastern Washington	91
3	Sacramento State	83

Championship; Saturday, March 14; ESPNU
1	Montana	65
2	Eastern Washington	69

 *Denotes overtime game

== Game summaries ==
=== Eastern Washington vs. Idaho ===
Broadcasters: Jay Sanderson & Tanoka Beard

Watch Big Sky

Mar 12
11 a.m. MDT

Idaho Vandals vs. Eastern Washington Eagles

Dahlberg Arena
Missoula, MT

=== Sacramento State vs. Portland State ===
Broadcasters: Jay Sanderson & Tanoka Beard

Watch Big Sky

Mar 12
1:30 p.m. MDT

Portland State Vikings vs. Sacramento State Hornets

Dahlberg Arena
Missoula, MT

=== Northern Arizona vs. Northern Colorado ===
Broadcasters: Jay Sanderson & Tanoka Beard

Watch Big Sky

Mar 12
5:30 p.m. MDT

Northern Colorado Bears vs. Northern Arizona Lumberjacks

Dahlberg Arena
Missoula, MT

=== Montana vs. Weber State ===
Broadcasters: Jay Sanderson & Tanoka Beard

Watch Big Sky

Mar 12
8 p.m. MDT

Weber State Wildcats vs. Montana Grizzlies

Dahlberg Arena
Missoula, MT

=== Semifinal 1 ===
Broadcasters: Jay Sanderson & Tanoka Beard

Watch Big Sky

Mar 13
5:30 p.m. MDT

Dahlberg Arena
Missoula, MT

=== Semifinal 2 ===
Broadcasters: Jay Sanderson & Tanoka Beard

Watch Big Sky

Mar 13
8 p.m. MDT

Dahlberg Arena
Missoula, MT

=== Championship ===
Broadcasters: Roxy Bernstein & Corey Williams

ESPNU

Mar 14
7 p.m. MDT

Dahlberg Arena
Missoula, MT
