= 2014–15 Southern Utah Thunderbirds men's basketball team =

American college basketball season

2014–15 Southern Utah Thunderbirds men's basketball
- Conference: Big Sky Conference
- Record: 10–19 (7–11 Big Sky)
- Head coach: Nick Robinson (3rd season)
- Assistant coaches: Drew Allen; Todd Okeson; Chad Bell
- Home arena: Centrum Arena

2014–15 Big Sky men's basketball standings
	Conf.				Overall
Team	W		L	PCT	W		L	PCT
Montana	14	–	4	.778	20	–	13	.606
Eastern Washington †	14	–	4	.778	26	–	9	.743
Sacramento State	13	–	5	.722	21	–	12	.636
Northern Arizona	13	–	5	.722	23	–	15	.605
Northern Colorado	10	–	8	.556	15	–	15	.500
Portland State	9	–	9	.500	15	–	14	.517
Idaho	8	–	10	.444	13	–	17	.433
Weber State	8	–	10	.444	13	–	17	.433
Southern Utah	7	–	11	.389	10	–	19	.345
North Dakota	4	–	14	.222	8	–	22	.267
Idaho State	4	–	14	.222	7	–	23	.233
Montana State	4	–	14	.222	7	–	23	.233
† Conference tournament winner

The 2014–15 Southern Utah Thunderbirds basketball team represented Southern Utah University during the 2014–15 NCAA Division I men's basketball season. The Thunderbirds were led by third year head coach Nick Robinson and played their home games at the Centrum Arena. They were members of the Big Sky Conference. They finished the season 10–19, 7–11 in Big Sky play to finish in ninth place. They failed to qualify for the Big Sky tournament.

== Roster ==
Number	Name	Position	Height	Weight	Year	Hometown
2	Austin Waddoups	Guard	6–2	160	Freshman	American Fork, Utah
3	Travon Langston	Guard	6–3	190	Junior	Las Vegas, Nevada
4	Trey Kennedy	Guard	6–3	195	Sophomore	Las Vegas, Nevada
5	John Marshall	Guard	6–1	180	Sophomore	Phoenix, Arizona
13	Race Parsons	Guard	6–4	185	Sophomore	Monroe, Utah
14	James McGee	Guard	6–2	190	Freshman	San Clemente, California
15	Juwan Major	Guard	6–3	180	Sophomore	Las Vegas, Nevada
21	Tyler Rawson	Forward	6–9	220	Freshman	American Fork, Utah
22	Sherron Wilson	Guard/Forward	6–6	220	Freshman	Las Vegas, Nevada
24	Eric Rippetoe	Forward	6–6	215	Senior	Panaca, Nevada
25	Christian Thompson	Guard/Forward	6–7	180	Junior	Phoenix, Arizona
32	Casey Oliverson	Forward	6–8	225	Junior	Logan, Utah
33	Kyler Neilson	Forward	6–6	180	Freshman	Cedar City, Utah
34	Cal Hanks	Center	6–11	240	Senior	Logan, Utah
35	A.J. Hess	Guard/Forward	6–6	210	Junior	Phoenix, Arizona

== Schedule ==
Date time, TV	Opponent	Result	Record	Site (attendance) city, state
Exhibition
11/01/2014*; 2:00 pm, no	San Diego Christian	W 79–57		Centrum Arena (1,069); Cedar City, UT
11/08/2014*; 7:00 pm, no	Arkansas–Fort Smith	L 72–73	–	Centrum Arena (N/A); Cedar City, UT
Regular season
11/14/2014*; 7:00 pm, no	at Kansas State	L 68–98	0–1	Bramlage Coliseum (12,405); Manhattan, KS
11/16/2014*; 12:00 pm, no	at Miami (OH)	L 63–76	0–2	Millett Hall (972); Oxford, OH
11/22/2014*; 7:00 pm, no	Utah Valley	L 75–85	0–3	Centrum Arena (N/A); Cedar City, UT
11/26/2014*; 7:00 pm, no	Eastern Kentucky	L 64–73	0–4	Centrum Arena (N/A); Cedar City, UT
11/30/2014*; 11:00 am, no	at UTSA	W 93–92	1–4	Convocation Center (769); San Antonio, TX
12/06/2014*; 7:00 pm, no	St. Katherine	W 92–45	2–4	Centrum Arena (1,099); Cedar City, UT
12/14/2014*; 4:30 pm, no	at Boise State; Las Vegas Classic	L 60–79	2–5	Taco Bell Arena (3,995); Boise, ID
12/19/2014*; 6:00 pm, no	at Loyola–Chicago; Las Vegas Classic	L 57–73	2–6	Joseph J. Gentile Arena (1,119); Chicago, IL
12/22/2014*; 1:00 pm, no	vs. Arkansas–Pine Bluff; Las Vegas Classic	L 61–70	2–7	Orleans Arena (N/A); Paradise, NV
12/23/2014*; 1:30 pm, no	vs. South Carolina State; Las Vegas Classic	W 66–56	3–7	Orleans Arena (N/A); Paradise, NV
12/27/2014*; 8:00 pm, no	at UNLV	L 45–79	3–8	Thomas & Mack Center (13,556); Paradise, NV
01/01/2015; 8:00 pm, no	at Portland State	L 68–71	3–9 (0–1)	Stott Center (330); Portland, OR
01/03/2015; 8:00 pm, no	at Sacramento State	L 75–90	3–10 (0–2)	Colberg Court (545); Sacramento, CA
01/10/2015; 2:00 pm, no	at Northern Arizona	L 67–70	3–11 (0–3)	Walkup Skydome (1,287); Fkagstaff
01/15/2015; 7:00 pm, no	Idaho State	L 67–71	4–11 (1–3)	Centrum Arena (N/A); Cedar City, UT
01/17/2015; 7:00 pm, no	Weber State	W 70–60	5–11 (2–3)	Centrum Arena (1,842); Cedar City, UT
01/22/2015; 7:00 pm, no	at Montana State	L 65–79	5–12 (2–4)	Worthington Arena (1,587); Bozeman, MT
01/24/2015; 7:00 pm, no	at Montana	L 56–58	5–13 (2–5)	Worthington Arena (3,918); Bozeman, MT
01/31/2015; 7:00 pm, no	Northern Arizona	L 60–81	5–14 (2–6)	Centrum Arena (1,687); Cedar City, UT
02/05/2015; 7:00 pm, no	North Dakota	L 85–89 ^{OT}	5–15 (2–7)	Centrum Arena (1,667); Cedar City, UT
02/07/2015; 7:00 pm, no	Northern Colorado	L 80–84	5–16 (2–8)	Centrum Arena (1,629); Cedar City, UT
02/12/2015; 7:00 pm, no	at Weber State	W 65–56	6–16 (3–8)	Dee Events Center (7,113); Ogden, UT
02/14/2015; 7:00 pm, no	at Idaho State	L 67–71	7–16 (4–8)	Reed Gym (1,582); Pocatello, ID
02/19/2015; 7:00 pm, no	Eastern Washington	L 75–78	7–17 (4–9)	Centrum Arena (1,111); Cedar City, UT
02/21/2015; 7:00 pm, no	Idaho	W 79–77 ^{OT}	8–17 (5–9)	Centrum Arena (1,411); Cedar City, UT
02/26/2015; 7:00 pm, no	at Northern Colorado	L 67–77	8–18 (5–10)	Bank of Colorado Arena (1,338); Greeley, CO
02/28/2015; 1:00 pm, no	at North Dakota	W 71–65	9–18 (6–10)	Betty Engelstad Sioux Center (1,908); Grand Forks, ND
03/05/2015; 7:00 pm, no	Sacramento State	W 69–65	10–18 (7–10)	Centrum Arena (1,780); Cedar City, UT
03/07/2015; 7:00 pm, no	Portland State	L 73–86	10–19 (7–11)	Centrum Arena (1,717); Cedar City, UT
*Non-conference game. ^{#}Rankings from AP Poll. (#) Tournament seedings in parentheses. All times are in Mountain Time.
