= 2014–15 Montana Grizzlies basketball team =

American college basketball season

2014–15 Montana Grizzlies men's basketball

Big Sky regular season co–champions

NIT, First round
- Conference: Big Sky Conference
- Record: 20–13 (14–4 Big Sky)
- Head coach: Travis DeCuire (1st season)
- Assistant coaches: Ken Bone; Jonathan Metzger-Jones; Chris Cobb
- Home arena: Dahlberg Arena

2014–15 Big Sky men's basketball standings
	Conf.				Overall
Team	W		L	PCT	W		L	PCT
Montana	14	–	4	.778	20	–	13	.606
Eastern Washington †	14	–	4	.778	26	–	9	.743
Sacramento State	13	–	5	.722	21	–	12	.636
Northern Arizona	13	–	5	.722	23	–	15	.605
Northern Colorado	10	–	8	.556	15	–	15	.500
Portland State	9	–	9	.500	15	–	14	.517
Idaho	8	–	10	.444	13	–	17	.433
Weber State	8	–	10	.444	13	–	17	.433
Southern Utah	7	–	11	.389	10	–	19	.345
North Dakota	4	–	14	.222	8	–	22	.267
Idaho State	4	–	14	.222	7	–	23	.233
Montana State	4	–	14	.222	7	–	23	.233
† Conference tournament winner

The 2014–15 Montana Grizzlies basketball team represented the University of Montana during the 2014–15 NCAA Division I men's basketball season. The Grizzlies, led by first-year head coach Travis DeCuire, played their home games at Dahlberg Arena and were members of the Big Sky Conference. They finished the season 20–13, 14–4 in Big Sky play to finish in a share for the Big Sky regular season championship. They advanced to the championship game of the Big Sky tournament where they lost to Eastern Washington. As a regular season conference champions and #1 overall seed in their conference tournament, they received an automatic bid to the National Invitation Tournament where they lost in the first round to Texas A&M.

== Roster ==
Number	Name	Position	Height	Weight	Year	Hometown
1	Mario Dunn Jr.	Guard	6–0	172	Sophomore	Oakland, California
2	Riley Bradshaw	Guard	6–2	180	Sophomore	Corvallis, Montana
10	Jordan Gregory	Guard	6–2	194	Senior	Pueblo, Colorado
12	Martin Breunig	Forward	6–8	210	Junior	Leverkusen, Germany
14	Jermaine Edmonds Jr.	Guard	6–5	200	Sophomore	Richmond, California
20	Fabijan Krslovic	Forward	6–8	225	Freshman	Sydney, Australia
22	Daniel Nwosu	Guard	6–2	175	Sophomore	Ottawa, Ontario
24	Chris Kemp	Center	6–7	236	Senior	Baltimore, Maryland
30	Gavin DeJong	Forward	6–6	215	Freshman	Manhattan, Montana
31	Jack Lopez	Guard	6–5	210	Sophomore	Bankstown, Australia
33	Michael Weisner	Forward	6–7	193	RS Senior	Walla Walla, Washington
34	Brandon Gfeller	Guard	6–4	190	Sophomore	Colfax, Washington
35	Bryden Boehning	Center	6–10	230	Freshman	Glendive, Montana

== Schedule ==
Date time, TV	Rank^{#}	Opponent^{#}	Result	Record	Site (attendance) city, state
Exhibition
11/03/2014*; 7:00 pm		Whitworth	W 94–79		Dahlberg Arena (2,542); Missoula, MT
11/08/2014*; 7:00 pm		Saint Martin's	W 104–70		Dahlberg Arena (2,689); Missoula, MT
Regular season
11/15/2015*; 8:00 pm, RTRM		at Colorado State	L 66–83	0–1	Moby Arena (3,602); Fort Collins, CO
11/18/2015*; 8:00 pm		at Boise State	L 67–72 ^{2OT}	0–2	Taco Bell Arena (4,535); Boise, ID
11/23/2015*; 8:30 pm		at Seattle	W 66–62	1–2	KeyArena (2,512); Seattle, WA
11/26/2014*; 7:00 pm		Carroll	W 75–52	2–2	Dahlberg Arena (2,892); Missoula, MT
11/30/2015*; 4:00 pm		at San Francisco	L 57–76	2–3	War Memorial Gymnasium (1,695); San Francisco, CA
12/03/2015*; 8:00 pm		at California	L 76–78 ^{2OT}	2–4	Haas Pavilion (5,837); Berkeley, CA
12/07/2014*; 7:00 pm		North Dakota State	W 69–57	3–4	Dahlberg Arena (2,752); Missoula, MT
12/10/2014*; 7:00 pm		Davidson	L 99–110	3–5	Dahlberg Arena (3,172); Missoula, MT
12/14/2014*; 4:00 pm		at Milwaukee	L 58–73	3–6	Klotsche Center (1,781); Milwaukee, WI
12/21/2014*; 1:00 pm		South Dakota	L 62–67	3–7	Dahlberg Arena (2,973); Missoula, MT
01/01/2015; 7:00 pm		Northern Colorado	W 66–48	4–7 (1–0)	Dahlberg Arena (2,950); Missoula, MT
01/03/2015; 7:00 pm		North Dakota	W 74–63	5–7 (2–0)	Dahlberg Arena (3,465); Missoula, MT
01/08/2015; 7:00 pm		at Weber State	L 60–68	5–8 (2–1)	Dee Events Center (6,508); Ogden, UT
01/10/2015; 7:00 pm		at Idaho State	W 90–64	6–8 (3–1)	Holt Arena (1,577); Pocatello, ID
01/13/2015*; 7:00 pm		Montana Tech	W 86–44	7–8	Dahlberg Arena (2,758); Missoula, MT
01/17/2015; 7:00 pm		Montana State	W 63–48	8–8 (4–1)	Dahlberg Arena (4,915); Missoula, MT
01/22/2015; 7:00 pm		Northern Arizona	W 64–57	9–8 (5–1)	Dahlberg Arena (3,244); Missoula, MT
01/24/2015; 7:00 pm		Southern Utah	W 58–56	10–8 (6–1)	Dahlberg Arena (3,918); Missoula, MT
01/29/2015; 8:00 pm		at Portland State	W 73–54	11–8 (7–1)	Stott Center (953); Portland, OR
01/31/2015; 8:00 pm		at Sacramento State	L 69–70	11–9 (7–2)	Colberg Court (1,407); Sacramento, CA
02/05/2015; 7:00 pm		Eastern Washington	L 69–75	11–10 (7–3)	Dahlberg Arena (3,930); Missoula, MT
02/07/2015; 7:00 pm		Idaho	W 70–56	12–10 (8–3)	Dahlberg Arena (3,861); Missoula, MT
02/12/2015; 6:00 pm		at North Dakota	W 65–61	13–10 (9–3)	Betty Engelstad Sioux Center (1,568); Grand Forks, ND
02/14/2015; 7:00 pm		at Northern Colorado	W 83–81 ^{3OT}	14–10 (10–3)	Bank of Colorado Arena (1,121); Greeley, CO
02/19/2015; 7:00 pm		Idaho State	W 88–77	15–10 (11–3)	Dahlberg Arena (3,313); Missoula, MT
02/21/2015; 7:00 pm		Weber State	W 74–63	16–10 (12–3)	Dahlberg Arena (4,416); Missoula, MT
02/26/2015; 8:00 pm		at Idaho	L 87–92 ^{2OT}	16–11 (12–4)	Cowan Spectrum (1,500); Moscow, ID
02/28/2015; 3:00 pm		at Eastern Washington	W 77–76	17–11 (13–4)	Reese Court (4,621); Cheney, WA
03/07/2015; 7:00 pm		at Montana State	W 70–54	18–11 (14–4)	Worthington Arena (3,021); Bozeman, MT
Big Sky tournament
03/12/2015; 8:00 pm		Weber State; Quarterfinals	W 76–73	19–11	Dahlberg Arena (3,938); Missoula, MT
03/13/2015; 10:00 pm		Northern Arizona; Semifinals	W 61–59	20–11	Dahlberg Arena (5,009); Missoula, MT
03/14/2015; 9:00 pm, ESPNU		Eastern Washington; Championship game	L 65–69	20–12	Dahlberg Arena (7,026); Missoula, MT
NIT
03/17/2015*; 7:00 pm, ESPNU	No. (7)	at (2) Texas A&M; First round	L 64–81	20–13	Reed Arena (2,583); College Station, TX
*Non-conference game. ^{#}Rankings from AP Poll. (#) Tournament seedings in parentheses. All times are in Mountain Time. (#) during NIT is seed within region.

== See also ==
2014–15 Montana Lady Griz basketball team
