= 2014–15 Northern Arizona Lumberjacks men's basketball team =

American college basketball season

2014–15 Northern Arizona Lumberjacks men's basketball

CIT, Runner-Up
- Conference: Big Sky Conference
- Record: 23–15 (13–5 Big Sky)
- Head coach: Jack Murphy (3rd season)
- Assistant coaches: Matt Dunn; Wes Pifer; Kevin Kruger
- Home arena: Walkup Skydome

2014–15 Big Sky men's basketball standings
	Conf.				Overall
Team	W		L	PCT	W		L	PCT
Montana	14	–	4	.778	20	–	13	.606
Eastern Washington †	14	–	4	.778	26	–	9	.743
Sacramento State	13	–	5	.722	21	–	12	.636
Northern Arizona	13	–	5	.722	23	–	15	.605
Northern Colorado	10	–	8	.556	15	–	15	.500
Portland State	9	–	9	.500	15	–	14	.517
Idaho	8	–	10	.444	13	–	17	.433
Weber State	8	–	10	.444	13	–	17	.433
Southern Utah	7	–	11	.389	10	–	19	.345
North Dakota	4	–	14	.222	8	–	22	.267
Idaho State	4	–	14	.222	7	–	23	.233
Montana State	4	–	14	.222	7	–	23	.233
† Conference tournament winner

The 2014–15 Northern Arizona Lumberjacks men's basketball team represented Northern Arizona University during the 2014–15 NCAA Division I men's basketball season. The Lumberjacks were led by third year head coach Jack Murphy and played their home games at the Walkup Skydome. They were members of the Big Sky Conference. They finished the season 23–15, 13–5 in Big Sky play to finish in a tie for third place. They advanced to the semifinals of the Big Sky tournament where they lost to Montana. They were invited to the CollegeInsider.com Tournament where they defeated Grand Canyon, Sacramento State, Kent State, and NJIT to advance to the CIT championship game where they lost to Evansville.

== Roster ==
2014–15 Northern Arizona Lumberjacks men's basketball team
Players
Coaches

Pos.	#	Name	Height	Weight	Year	Previous school	Hometown
G	0	Geoffrey Frid	7 ft 1 in (2.16 m)	233 lb (106 kg)	So	MiraCosta	Carlsbad, California
G	1	Aaseem Dixon	6 ft 0 in (1.83 m)	185 lb (84 kg)	Sr	Centennial HS/Arizona Western	Las Vegas, Nevada
G	2	Quinton Upshur	6 ft 5 in (1.96 m)	207 lb (94 kg)	Sr	Booker T. Washington HS/Kilgore College	Norfolk, Virginia
G	3	Tate de Laveaga	6 ft 3 in (1.91 m)	192 lb (87 kg)	Fr	Westwind Prep	Scottsdale, Arizona
G	4	Kris Yanku	6 ft 4 in (1.93 m)	183 lb (83 kg)	So	WH Taft HS	Woodland Hils, California
G	5	Torry Johnson	6 ft 3 in (1.91 m)	165 lb (75 kg)	Fr	Morgan Park HS	Chicago, Illinois
G	10	Jaleni Neely	6 ft 0 in (1.83 m)	165 lb (75 kg)	Jr	Simeon Academy/Eastern Utah	Chicago, Illinois
F/C	11	Ako Kaluna	6 ft 7 in (2.01 m)	276 lb (125 kg)	So	West Ranch HS	Valencia, California
G	12	Kye de Laveaga	6 ft 1 in (1.85 m)	178 lb (81 kg)	Fr	Westwind Prep	Scottsdale, Arizona
F	14	Zach Reynolds	6 ft 9 in (2.06 m)	240 lb (109 kg)	Sr	Mt. Zion Academy/Gulf Coast State	Tampa, Florida
F/C	15	Len Springs	6 ft 10 in (2.08 m)	220 lb (100 kg)	RS Sr	Dorsey HS/El Camino	Compton, California
G	21	Jaran Hoover	6 ft 3 in (1.91 m)	175 lb (79 kg)	RS Fr	Prescott HS	Prescott, Arizona
G	22	Chris Miller	6 ft 3 in (1.91 m)	175 lb (79 kg)	RS So	Greenway HS	Peoria, Arizona
G	23	Austin Lee	5 ft 10 in (1.78 m)	180 lb (82 kg)	Fr	Brentwood School	Los Angeles, California
F	24	Alex Stecca	6 ft 6 in (1.98 m)	195 lb (88 kg)	RS So	Mater Dei HS	Corona del Mar, California
F	32	Gaellan Bewernick	6 ft 6 in (1.98 m)	215 lb (98 kg)	Sr	Manual Arts HS	Los Angeles, California
F	34	Jordyn Martin	6 ft 7 in (2.01 m)	210 lb (95 kg)	Jr	Palo Verde HS	Las Vegas, Nevada

Head coach

- Jack Murphy

Assistant coach(es)

- Matt Dunn
- Wes Pifer
- Kevin Kruger

Legend

- (C) Team captain
- (S) Suspended
- (I) Ineligible
- (W) Walk-on
- Injured
- Current redshirt

Roster
Last update: 10/23/14

== Schedule ==
Date time, TV	Opponent	Result	Record	Site (attendance) city, state
Exhibition
10/29/2014*; 6:30 pm	California Baptist	W 87–82		Walkup Skydome (466); Flagstaff, AZ
Regular season
11/14/2014*; 4:00 pm, FCS Atlantic	at Xavier	L 60–93	0–1	Cintas Center (10,250); Cincinnati, OH
11/16/2014*; 11:00 am	at Toledo	L 58–71	0–2	Savage Arena (4,128); Toledo, OH
11/20/2014*; 8:00 pm, FSAZ+/FCS Atlantic	Fresno State	W 73–52	1–2	Rolle Activity Center (1,674); Flagstaff, AZ
11/23/2014*; 6:00 pm, SECN	at Ole Miss; Emerald Coast Classic	L 74–80	1–3	Tad Smith Coliseum (5,290); Oxford, MS
11/25/2014*; 8:00 pm	at Middle Tennessee; Emerald Coast Classic	L 53–65	1–4	Murphy Center (3,806); Murfreesboro, TN
11/28/2014*; 12:30 pm	vs. Southern; Emerald Coast Classic	W 70–63 ^{OT}	2–4	The Arena at NWFSC (410); Niceville, FL
11/29/2014*; 12:30 pm	vs. North Carolina Central; Emerald Coast Classic	L 36–40	2–5	The Arena at NWFSC (135); Niceville, FL
12/03/2014*; 7:30 pm, FS AZ/FCS Pacific	UTSA	L 83–88 ^{OT}	2–6	Walkup Skydome (1,147); Flagstaff, AZ
12/13/2014*; 2:00 pm, NAU-TV	Loyola Marymount	W 71–69	3–6	Walkup Skydome (803); Flagstaff, AZ
12/16/2014*; 8:00 pm	at Saint Mary's	W 73–71	4–6	McKeon Pavilion (2,402); Moraga, CA
12/19/2014*; 5:00 pm	at Norfolk State	L 62–81	4–7	Joseph G. Echols Memorial Hall (473); Norfolk, VA
12/21/2014*; 2:00 pm	at Hampton	L 66–75	4–8	Hampton Convocation Center (3,000); Hampton, VA
12/28/2014*; 2:00 pm	San Diego Christian	W 71–45	5–8	Walkup Skydome (503); Flagstaff, AZ
01/01/2015; 8:00 pm	at Sacramento State	L 73–78	5–9 (0–1)	Colberg Court (508); Sacramento, CA
01/03/2015; 8:00 pm	at Portland State	W 73–60	6–9 (1–1)	Stott Center (498); Portland, OR
01/10/2015; 2:00 pm, FS AZ/FCS Pacific	Southern Utah	W 70–67	7–9 (2–1)	Walkup Skydome (1,287); Flagstaff, AZ
01/15/2015; 6:30 pm, FS AZ+/FCS Pacific	Weber State	L 65–74	7–10 (2–2)	Walkup Skydome (2,603); Flagstaff, AZ
01/17/2015; 4:00 pm, FS AZ/FCS Pacific	Idaho State	W 72–69	8–10 (3–2)	Walkup Skydome (1,382); Flagstaff, AZ
01/22/2015; 7:00 pm	at Montana	L 57–64	8–11 (3–3)	Dahlberg Arena (3,244); Missoula, MT
01/24/2015; 2:30 pm	at Montana State	W 71–64	9–11 (4–3)	Worthington Arena (1,767); Bozeman, MT
01/31/2015; 7:00 pm	at Southern Utah	W 81–60	10–11 (5–3)	Centrum Arena (1,687); Cedar City, UT
02/05/2015; 6:30 pm, FS AZ+/FCS Pacific	Northern Colorado	W 65–60	11–11 (6–3)	Walkup Skydome (1,032); Flagstaff, AZ
02/07/2015; 2:00 pm, FS AZ/FCS Atlantic	North Dakota	W 88–63	12–11 (7–3)	Walkup Skydome (1,411); Flagstaff, AZ
02/12/2015; 7:00 pm	at Idaho State	L 66–80	12–12 (7–4)	Holt Arena (1,492); Pocatello, ID
02/14/2015; 7:00 pm	at Weber State	W 61–54	13–12 (8–4)	Dee Events Center (6,192); Ogden, UT
02/19/2015; 6:30 pm, FS AZ/FCS Pacific	Idaho	W 72–65	14–12 (9–4)	Walkup Skydome (1,427); Flagstaff, AZ
02/21/2015; 2:00 pm, FS AZ/FCS Atlantic	Eastern Washington	W 73–69	15–12 (10–4)	Walkup Skydome (2,261); Flagstaff, AZ
02/26/2015; 7:00 pm, FCS Pacific	at North Dakota	W 85–75	16–12 (11–4)	Betty Engelstad Sioux Center (1,454); Grand Forks, ND
02/28/2015; 7:00 pm	at Northern Colorado	L 74–76	16–13 (11–5)	Bank of Colorado Arena (1,776); Greeley, CO
03/05/2015; 6:30 pm, FS AZ+/FCS Pacific	Portland State	W 58–51	17–13 (12–5)	Walkup Skydome (1,146); Flagstaff, AZ
03/07/2015; 2:00 pm, FS AZ/FCS Atlantic	Sacramento State	W 70–68	18–13 (13–5)	Walkup Skydome (1,581); Flagstaff, AZ
Big Sky tournament
03/12/2015; 5:30 pm	vs. Northern Colorado; Quarterfinals	W 63–57	19–13	Dahlberg Arena (3,938); Missoula, MT
03/13/2015; 8:00 pm	at Montana; Semifinals	L 59–61	19–14	Dahlberg Arena (5,009); Missoula, MT
CIT
03/18/2015*; 6:00 pm, Cox 7	at Grand Canyon; First round	W 75–70	20–14	GCU Arena (5,702); Phoenix, AZ
03/21/2015*; 8:00 pm	at Sacramento State; Second round	W 78–73	21–14	Colberg Court (1,137); Sacramento, CA
03/27/2015*; 7:00 pm, FS AZ+/FCS Atlantic	Kent State; Quarterfinals	W 74–73 ^{OT}	22–14	Walkup Skydome (3,653); Flagstaff, AZ
03/31/2015*; 7:00 pm, CBSSN	NJIT; Semifinals	W 68–61	23–14	Walkup Skydome (5,583); Flagstaff, AZ
04/02/2015*; 4:00 pm, CBSSN	at Evansville; Championship game	L 65–71	23–15	Ford Center (4,549); Evansville, IN
*Non-conference game. ^{#}Rankings from AP Poll. (#) Tournament seedings in parentheses. All times are in Mountain Time.

== See also ==
2014–15 Northern Arizona Lumberjacks women's basketball team
