= Newark, California =

City in California, United States

- City
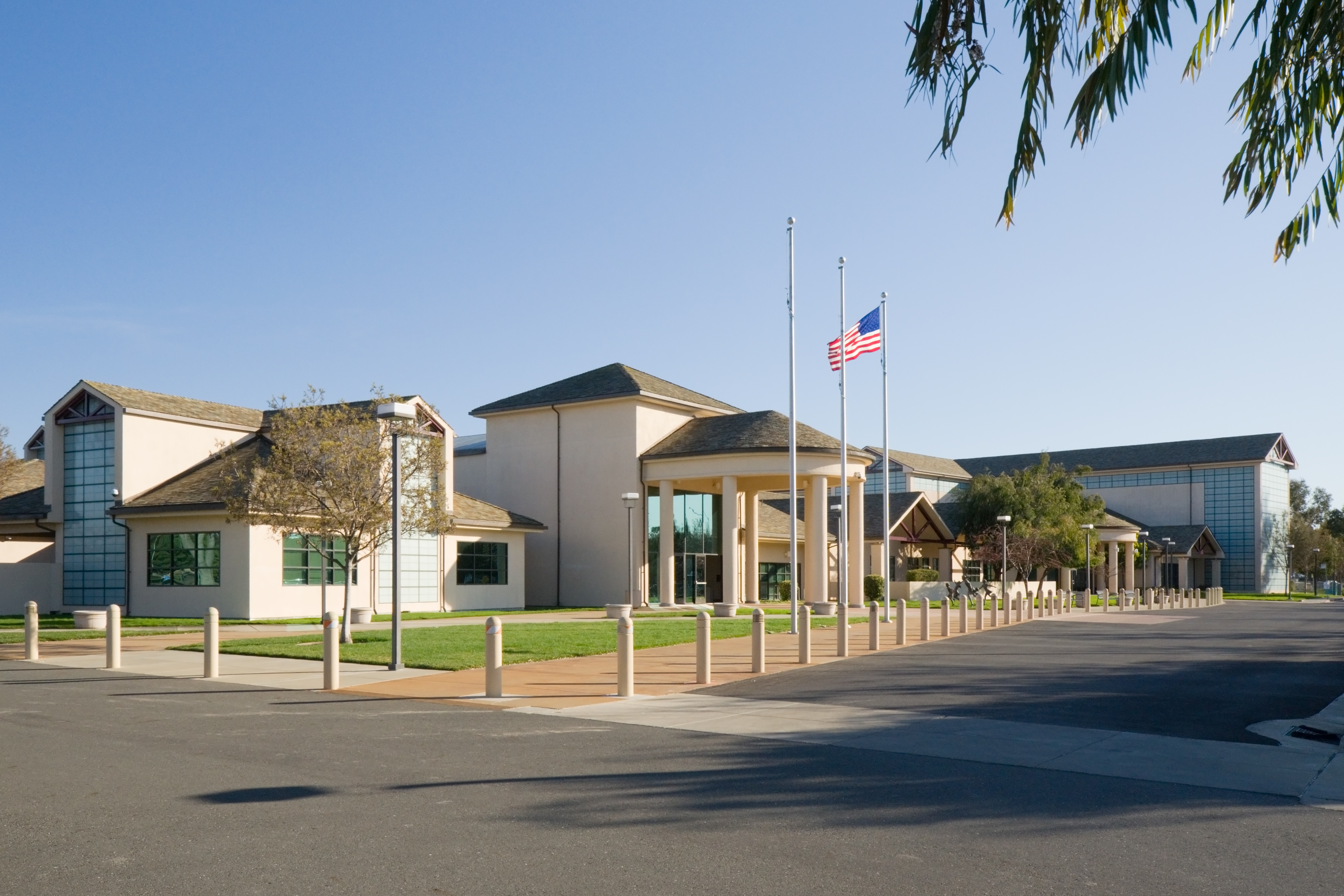
- Silliman Activity and Family Aquatic Center

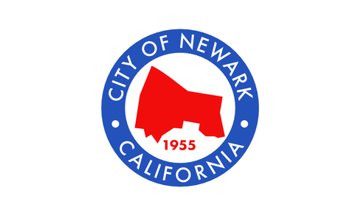
- Flag Logo
- Interactive map of Newark, California
- Location within San Francisco Bay Area Location within California Location within the United States
- Coordinates: 37°32′N 122°2′W
- Country: United States
- State: California
- County: Alameda
- Incorporated: September 22, 1955
- Named for: Newark Castle, Port Glasgow

Government
  - Mayor: Michael K. Hannon
  - State Senate: Vacant
  - State Assembly: Alex Lee (D)
  - U. S. Congress: Ro Khanna (D)

Area
  - Total: 13.94 sq mi (36.11 km^{2})
  - Land: 13.92 sq mi (36.05 km^{2})
  - Water: 0.023 sq mi (0.06 km^{2}) 0.17%
- Elevation: 20 ft (6.1 m)

Population (2020)
  - Total: 47,529
  - Density: 3,415/sq mi (1,318/km^{2})
- Time zone: UTC−8 (Pacific (PST))
  - Summer (DST): UTC−7 (PDT)
- ZIP code: 94560
- Area code: 510, 341
- FIPS code: 06-50916
- GNIS feature IDs: 277562, 2411238
- Website: www.newarkca.gov

Newark (/ˈnjuːərk/ NEW-ərk) is a city in Alameda County, California, United States. It was incorporated as a city in September 1955. Newark is an enclave, surrounded by the city of Fremont. The three cities of Newark, Fremont, and Union City make up the Tri-City Area. Newark's population was 47,529 at the 2020 census making it the third largest city in the US named Newark after Newark, New Jersey, and Newark, Ohio.

== Geography ==
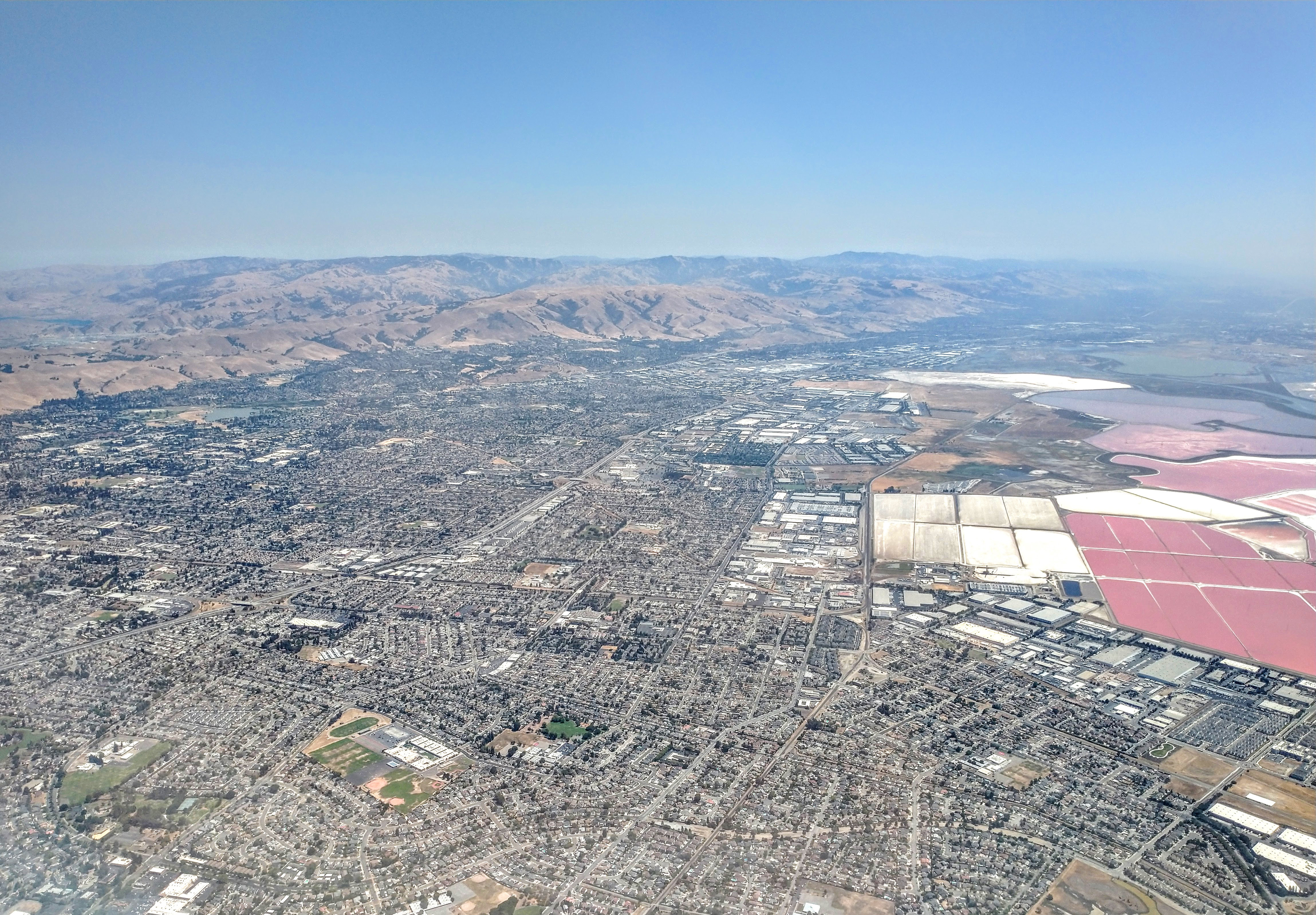
Aerial view of Fremont, California and Newark, California in 2021. Newark is on the right, west of Interstate 880.

The western edge of the city is near the southern end of the San Francisco Bay. State Route 84 runs through the city, and continues as the Dumbarton Bridge to cross the San Francisco Bay to reach Menlo Park. Interstate 880 serves as the eastern boundary with Fremont.

According to the United States Census Bureau, the city has a total area of 13.9 square miles (36 km^{2}), of which 13.9 square miles (36 km^{2}) is land and 0.02 square miles (0.052 km^{2}), comprising 0.17%, is water.

== History ==
Newark was named after Newark Castle, Port Glasgow, in Scotland by J. Barr Robertson.

Before it was settled by Europeans, Newark was home to the Ohlone Native American Peoples. The first European settlement in the area was by the Spanish missionaries of Mission San José, whose territory covered much of the present-day cities of Newark, Fremont, and Union City. In 1878 land belonging to Washington Township of Alameda County was purchased by The Pacific Land Investment Company and subdivided to form the town of Newark.

In the early 1950s, the amalgamation of towns was increasing in Alameda County. In 1953, residents in the towns surrounding Newark were concerned about being annexed into the nearby city of Hayward, and began plans to incorporate as a single city, eventually becoming Fremont. Driven by their own concerns of being forced to amalgamate into this new city and the resulting changes in zoning, Newark was incorporated in September 1955, before the incorporation of Fremont was completed.

== Demographics ==
Historical population
Census	Pop.	Note	%±
1880	179		—
1950	1,532		—
1960	9,884		545.2%
1970	27,153		174.7%
1980	32,126		18.3%
1990	37,861		17.9%
2000	42,471		12.2%
2010	42,573		0.2%
2020	47,529		11.6%
U.S. Decennial Census; 1860–1870 1880-1890; 1900 1910 1920; 1930 1940 1950; 1960 1970 1980; 1990 2000 2010; 2020

=== 2020 census ===
As of the 2020 census, Newark had a population of 47,529 and a population density of 3,414.7 inhabitants per square mile (1,318.4/km^{2}). The age distribution was 20.6% under the age of 18, 7.8% aged 18 to 24, 33.2% aged 25 to 44, 25.0% aged 45 to 64, and 13.3% who were 65 years of age or older. The median age was 36.8 years. For every 100 females, there were 101.4 males, and for every 100 females age 18 and over there were 100.0 males.

The Census reported that 99.4% of the population lived in households, 0.6% lived in non-institutionalized group quarters, and 0.0% were institutionalized. In total, 99.9% of residents lived in urban areas and 0.1% lived in rural areas.

There were 14,946 households, out of which 38.7% included children under the age of 18, 60.8% were married-couple households, 5.6% were cohabiting couple households, 18.8% had a female householder with no partner present, and 14.8% had a male householder with no partner present. 14.1% of households were one person, and 5.8% were one person aged 65 or older. The average household size was 3.16. There were 11,858 families (79.3% of all households).

There were 15,371 housing units at an average density of 1,104.3 units per square mile (426.4 units/km^{2}), of which 14,946 (97.2%) were occupied. Of occupied units, 68.1% were owner-occupied and 31.9% were occupied by renters. The homeowner vacancy rate was 0.7%, and the rental vacancy rate was 3.4%.

Demographic profile	2020
Total Population	47,529–100.0%
One Race	41,717 – 87.8%
Not Hispanic or Latino	33,169 – 69.8%
White alone	8,945 – 18.8%
Black or African American alone	1,466 – 3.1%
American Indian and Alaska Native alone	90 – 0.2%
Asian alone	19,602 – 41.2%
Native Hawaiian and Other Pacific Islander alone	657 – 1.4%
Some other race alone	248 – 0.5%
Two or more races alone	2,161 – 4.5%
Hispanic or Latino (of any race)	14,360 – 30.2%

=== 2023 American Community Survey estimates ===
In 2023, the US Census Bureau estimated that 43.0% of the population were foreign-born. Of all people aged 5 or older, 42.8% spoke only English at home, 19.1% spoke Spanish, 11.6% spoke other Indo-European languages, 26.1% spoke Asian or Pacific Islander languages, and 0.4% spoke other languages. Of those aged 25 or older, 89.5% were high school graduates and 47.1% had a bachelor's degree.

The median household income was $164,909, and the per capita income was $68,775. About 2.1% of families and 4.2% of the population were below the poverty line.

== Politics ==
In the state legislature, Newark is in the 10th senatorial district, seat currently vacant, and in the 24th Assembly district, represented by Democrat Alex Lee. Federally, Newark is in California's 17th congressional district, represented by Democrat Ro Khanna.

== Economy ==
Newark's economy is at the edge of Silicon Valley and shares its economic pattern.

Cargill Salt, previously known as Leslie Salt, operates a large salt refinery in Newark, cleaning salt produced in salt evaporation ponds in the San Francisco Bay.

The city houses the NewPark Mall, a super-regional shopping center, with Hot Topic, Box lunch, and a nearby Costco.. A 140,000-square-foot (13,000 m^{2}) addition at NewPark, including restaurants, entertainment and a multiplex movie theater with IMAX, opened in 2015.

The former Sun Microsystems site near I-880, State Route 84 and the Dumbarton Bridge, was purchased by BioMed Realty Trust and is now known as the Pacific Research Center.

The internet retailer ZipZoomfly was headquartered in the city until 2012 when they stopped operating.

In the early to mid-20th century, Newark's economy was based on manufacturing, including: Wedgewood stoves (1910s–1940s); A.O. Smith Corporation, followed by National Steel Corporation, glass-lined water heaters (1950s–1970s); Peterbilt trucks (1960s-1980s); and Trailmobile semi-trailers (1965–1975).

=== Top employers ===
According to the city's June 2025 Annual Comprehensive Financial Report, the top employers in the city are:

#	Employer	# of Employees
1	Lucid Motors	2,665
2	WorldPac	521
3	Amazon Fulfillment Center	453
4	Newark Unified School District	448
5	Costco	315
6	City of Newark	290
7	KNT Manufacturing	250
8	Nordstrom Distribution Center	230
9	Cargill Salt	202
10	SMART Modular Technologies	139

== Culture and recreation ==
The City of Newark has thirteen parks and sport play facilities, the George M. Silliman Community Activity and Family Aquatic Center (aka the Silliman Center). The Family Aquatic Center portion of the Silliman Center opened in the summer of 2004 and includes a 32,300-square-foot (3,000 m^{2}) indoor swim facility specifically designed for recreation, fitness, and instruction programs for the entire family. The 11,350-square-foot (1,054 m^{2}) Natatorium includes four separate pools, including a 45 ft × 75 ft (14 m × 23 m) Activity Pool; a 245' long Lazy River pool (with a pair of 20' tall, curving water slides); a 4-foot (1.2 m) deep, 4-lane, 25-yard (23 m) Lap Pool; and a 15-person warm-water spa.

Newark also houses a portion of the Don Edwards San Francisco Bay National Wildlife refuge along with the city of Fremont.

Newark also hosts a festival in honor of the city's founding. "Newark Days" is a four-day Festival/Celebration that takes place every September on the Macgregor Soccer fields (adjacent to the Community center on Cedar Boulevard). The City of Newark is also commonly known with their soccer club, 1974 NFC (Newark Football Club).

== Transportation ==
Newark lies near the intersection of I-880, State Route 84, and the Dumbarton Bridge.

Newark is served by AC Transit bus system. Surrounding Fremont is the access point for most transportation services, including Fremont and Union City BART stations, and ACE and Amtrak trains.

=== Vision for future rail ===
In 2007, the plans for the Dumbarton Rail Corridor envisioned Caltrain building a station in Newark.

== Education ==
Newark is home to a new campus of Ohlone College, a member of the California Community Colleges system. Other nearby educational centers include the University of Phoenix, ITT Institute, DeVry University, and Unitek College.

Newark has two high schools, Newark Memorial High School and Bridgepoint High School, and one junior high school, Newark Middle School. Bridgepoint High School is an alternative high school on the MacGregor Campus which also houses Newark Adult School. Elementary schools include Kennedy, Coyote Hills (formerly Graham), Lincoln, Schilling, Birch Grove Primary (K-3)(formerly Bunker), and Birch Grove Intermediate (4–6) (formerly Milani) Schools and one private Catholic elementary-8th grade, St. Edward's Catholic School, and previously Musick and Snow School before their clousures.

== Climate ==
Climate data for Newark, California
Month	Jan	Feb	Mar	Apr	May	Jun	Jul	Aug	Sep	Oct	Nov	Dec	Year
Record high °F (°C)	74 (23)	78 (26)	84 (29)	92 (33)	98 (37)	107 (42)	105 (41)	110 (43)	103 (39)	96 (36)	84 (29)	75 (24)	107 (42)
Mean daily maximum °F (°C)	57.3 (14.1)	60.8 (16.0)	63.5 (17.5)	66.6 (19.2)	70.2 (21.2)	74.2 (23.4)	76.7 (24.8)	77.0 (25.0)	77.3 (25.2)	72.8 (22.7)	64.6 (18.1)	58.0 (14.4)	68.2 (20.1)
Daily mean °F (°C)	49.0 (9.4)	52.2 (11.2)	54.7 (12.6)	57.4 (14.1)	60.9 (16.1)	64.5 (18.1)	66.6 (19.2)	67.0 (19.4)	66.6 (19.2)	62.6 (17.0)	55.4 (13.0)	49.6 (9.8)	58.9 (14.9)
Mean daily minimum °F (°C)	40.6 (4.8)	43.7 (6.5)	45.9 (7.7)	48.2 (9.0)	51.7 (10.9)	54.9 (12.7)	56.4 (13.6)	57.0 (13.9)	56.0 (13.3)	52.3 (11.3)	46.2 (7.9)	41.3 (5.2)	49.5 (9.7)
Record low °F (°C)	22 (−6)	26 (−3)	25 (−4)	32 (0)	35 (2)	41 (5)	44 (7)	41 (5)	40 (4)	33 (1)	26 (−3)	21 (−6)	21 (−6)
Average precipitation inches (mm)	2.96 (75)	2.52 (64)	2.10 (53)	1.02 (26)	0.41 (10)	0.10 (2.5)	0.02 (0.51)	0.05 (1.3)	0.13 (3.3)	0.78 (20)	1.78 (45)	2.46 (62)	14.31 (363)
Average precipitation days (≥ 0.01 in)	10	8	8	5	3	1	0	0	1	3	7	9	56
Source: Western Regional Climate Center

== Notable people ==
- Terry Alderete, businesswoman
- Bayley, professional wrestler
- Larry Bettencourt, NFL player for the Green Bay Packers, MLB player for the St. Louis Browns
- Paul Bostaph, drummer
- Rollie Fingers, MLB Hall of Fame relief pitcher
- Chris Flexen, pitcher, Seattle Mariners
- Steven J. Lopes, Bishop of the Personal Ordinariate of the Chair of Saint Peter
- Joey Lucchesi, pitcher, San Diego Padres
- Freddie Muller, infielder, Boston Red Sox
- Rocky Pamplin, author, former football player, member of the Beach Boys
- Joe Rudi, MLB player
- Ron Thompson, guitarist
- Christopher Titus, comedian
- Bill Walsh lived in Newark from 1957 to 1960 while working at Washington High School in Fremont.
- Elaine Welteroth, American journalist and former Editor-in-Chief of Teen Vogue
