= 2014–15 South Dakota Coyotes men's basketball team =

American college basketball season

2014–15 South Dakota Coyotes men's basketball
- Conference: The Summit League
- Record: 17–16 (9–7 The Summit)
- Head coach: Craig Smith (1st season)
- Assistant coaches: Gameli Ahelegbe; Austin Hansen; Eric Peterson
- Home arena: DakotaDome

2014–15 Summit League men's basketball standings
	Conf.				Overall
Team	W		L	PCT	W		L	PCT
North Dakota State †	12	–	4	.750	23	–	10	.697
South Dakota State	12	–	4	.750	24	–	11	.686
Oral Roberts	10	–	6	.625	19	–	15	.559
IPFW	9	–	7	.563	16	–	15	.516
South Dakota	9	–	7	.563	17	–	16	.515
Denver	6	–	10	.375	12	–	18	.400
IUPUI	6	–	10	.375	10	–	21	.323
Omaha*	5	–	11	.313	12	–	17	.414
Western Illinois	3	–	13	.188	8	–	20	.286
† 2015 Summit League Tournament winner *ineligible for postseason play due to Div. I transition

The 2014–15 South Dakota Coyotes men's basketball team represented the University of South Dakota during the 2014–15 NCAA Division I men's basketball season. The Coyotes, led by first year head coach Craig Smith, played their home games at the DakotaDome and were members of The Summit League. They finished the season 17–16, 9–7 in The Summit League play to finish in a tie for fourth place. They advanced to the quarterfinals of The Summit League tournament where they lost to South Dakota State.

== Roster ==
Number	Name	Position	Height	Year	Hometown
1	Trey Norris	Guard	6–0	Junior	Grand Prairie, Texas
2	Tre Burnette	Guard	6–5	Junior	Madison, Wisconsin
4	Edso Avila	Forward	6–9	Junior	The Bronx, New York
5	Zach Dickerson	Guard	6–3	Sophomore	Argyle, Texas
11	Sekou Harris	Guard	6–0	Junior	Plainfield, New Jersey
12	Brandon Bos	Guard	6–1	Senior	Markham, Ontario
13	Adam Thoseby	Guard	6–5	Junior	Melbourne, Australia
14	Casey Kasperbauer	Guard	6–1	Junior	Carroll, Iowa
21	Logan Power	Forward	6–4	Freshman	Lincoln, Nebraska
23	Tyler Flack	Forward	6–7	Junior	Lakeville, Minnesota
24	Duol Mayot	Forward	6–5	Junior	Omaha, Nebraska
32	Dejon "D.J." Davis	Guard	6–4	Freshman	Bloomington, Minnesota
41	Eric Robertson	Forward	6–8	Junior	Wayzata, Minnesota
45	Austin Sparks	Forward	6–8	RS–Freshman	Denver, Colorado
50	James Hunter	Center	6–10	Senior	Sydney, Australia
55	Tyler Larson	Guard	6–3	Senior	Las Vegas, Nevada

== Schedule ==
Date time, TV	Opponent	Result	Record	Site (attendance) city, state
Regular season
11/14/2014*; 8:00 pm	at Utah Valley	L 52–60	0–1	UCCU Center (2,302); Orem, UT
11/16/2014*; 5:00 pm, P12N	at Stanford; Coaches vs. Cancer Classic	L 73–84	0–2	Maples Pavilion (5,025); Stanford, CA
11/21/2014*; 8:00 pm	vs. Sam Houston State; Coaches vs. Cancer Classic	L 85–93 ^{3OT}	0–3	Webster Bank Arena (1,733); Bridgeport, CT
11/22/2014*; 4:00 pm	vs. Wofford; Coaches vs. Cancer Classic	L 68–72	0–4	Webster Bank Arena (1,733); Bridgeport, CT
11/23/2014*; 1:00 pm	at Fairfield; Coaches vs. Cancer Classic	L 72–80 ^{OT}	0–5	Webster Bank Arena (1,487); Bridgeport, CT
11/26/2014*; 7:00 pm	Wayne State College	W 86–69	1–5	DakotaDome (1,230); Vermillion, SD
11/30/2014*; 6:00 pm	at Cal State Bakersfield	W 68–66	2–5	Icardo Center (885); Bakersfield, CA
12/02/2014*; 9:00 pm	at Cal State Northridge	W 68–65	3–5	Matadome (805); Northridge, CA
12/05/2014*; 7:00 pm	Youngstown State	L 79–87	3–6	DakotaDome (1,492); Vermillion, SD
12/09/2014*; 8:00 pm, FS1	at Creighton	L 88–91 ^{2OT}	3–7	CenturyLink Center (16,270); Omaha, NE
12/13/2014*; 7:00 pm, Midco/ESPN3	vs. UNLV	L 61–75	3–8	Sanford Pentagon (3,250); Sioux Falls, SD
12/18/2014*; 7:30 pm, Midco	Montana State	W 55–53	4–8	DakotaDome (1,328); Vermillion, SD
12/21/2014*; 3:00 pm	at Montana	W 67–62	5–8	Dahlberg Arena (2,973); Missoula, MT
12/28/2014*; 2:00 pm	Milwaukee	W 84–60	6–8	DakotaDome (1,298); Vermillion, SD
01/02/2015; 7:00 pm	Omaha	L 77–86	6–9 (0–1)	DakotaDome (1,425); Vermillion, SD
01/04/2015; 2:00 pm	at Denver	W 74–69	7–9 (1–1)	Magness Arena (3,554); Denver, CO
01/10/2015; 6:00 pm, PBS 39	at IPFW	W 64–62	8–9 (2–1)	Gates Sports Center (1,153); Fort Wayne, IN
01/14/2015; 7:00 pm, Midco/ESPN3	North Dakota State	W 71–67	9–9 (3–1)	DakotaDome (1,863); Vermillion, SD
01/17/2015; 4:30 pm, Midco/ESPN3	at South Dakota State	L 57–71	9–10 (3–2)	Frost Arena (5,354); Brookings, SD
01/22/2015; 7:00 pm	at Western Illinois	W 68–58	10–10 (4–2)	Western Hall (1,126); Macomb, IL
01/24/2015; 12:00 pm, HTSN/ESPN3	at IUPUI	L 50–65	10–11 (4–3)	Indiana Farmers Coliseum (1,320); Indianapolis, IN
01/29/2015; 7:00 pm, Midco/ESPN3	IPFW	L 55–66	10–12 (4–4)	DakotaDome (1,526); Vermillion, SD
01/31/2015; 4:30 pm	Oral Roberts	L 72–73	10–13 (4–5)	DakotaDome (2,064); Vermillion, SD
02/05/2015; 7:00 pm, Midco/ESPN3	Western Illinois	W 75–61	11–13 (5–5)	DakotaDome (1,418); Vermillion, SD
02/07/2015; 2:00 pm, MeTV ND	at North Dakota State	L 47–71	11–14 (5–6)	Scheels Arena (3,420); Fargo, ND
02/12/2015; 2:00 pm	at Omaha	W 74–73	12–14 (6–6)	Ralston Arena (1,457); Ralston, NE
02/14/2015; 7:00 pm, ESPN3	at Oral Roberts	W 83–70	13–14 (7–6)	Mabee Center (4,005); Tulsa, OK
02/17/2015*; 7:00 pm	Avila	W 84–60	14–14	DakotaDome (1,250); Vermillion, SD
02/21/2015; 2:00 pm	IUPUI	W 77–62	15–14 (8–6)	DakotaDome (1,723); Vermillion, SD
02/25/2015; 7:00 pm, Midco/ESPN3	Denver	L 48–66	15–15 (8–7)	DakotaDome (1,256); Vermillion, SD
02/28/2015; 4:00 pm, Midco/ESPN3	South Dakota State	W 80–64	16–15 (9–7)	DakotaDome (4,812); Vermillion, SD
The Summit League tournament
03/08/2015; 6:00 pm, Midco/ESPN3	vs. IPFW; Quarterfinals	W 82–73	17–15	Denny Sanford PREMIER Center (6,653); Sioux Falls, SD
03/09/2015; 6:00 pm, Midco/ESPN3	vs. South Dakota State; Semifinals	L 65–78	17–16	Denny Sanford PREMIER Center (10,153); Sioux Falls, SD
*Non-conference game. ^{#}Rankings from AP Poll. (#) Tournament seedings in parentheses. All times are in Central Time.
