= 2014–15 North Dakota State Bison men's basketball team =

American college basketball season

2014–15 North Dakota State Bison men's basketball

The Summit League regular season co–champions The Summit League Tournament champions

NCAA tournament, round of 64
- Conference: The Summit League
- Record: 23–10 (12–4 The Summit)
- Head coach: David Richman (1st season)
- Assistant coaches: Jayden Olson; Eric Henderson; Freddy Coleman
- Home arena: Scheels Arena

2014–15 Summit League men's basketball standings
	Conf.				Overall
Team	W		L	PCT	W		L	PCT
North Dakota State †	12	–	4	.750	23	–	10	.697
South Dakota State	12	–	4	.750	24	–	11	.686
Oral Roberts	10	–	6	.625	19	–	15	.559
IPFW	9	–	7	.563	16	–	15	.516
South Dakota	9	–	7	.563	17	–	16	.515
Denver	6	–	10	.375	12	–	18	.400
IUPUI	6	–	10	.375	10	–	21	.323
Omaha*	5	–	11	.313	12	–	17	.414
Western Illinois	3	–	13	.188	8	–	20	.286
† 2015 Summit League Tournament winner *ineligible for postseason play due to Div. I transition

The 2014–15 North Dakota State Bison men's basketball team represented North Dakota State University in the 2014–15 NCAA Division I men's basketball season. The Bison, led by first year head coach David Richman, played their home games at the Scheels Arena, due to renovations at the Bison Sports Arena, and were members of The Summit League. They finished the season 23–10, 12–4 in The Summit League play to finish as regular season co–champions of The Summit. They defeated Denver, Oral Roberts, and South Dakota State to become champions of The Summit League tournament. They received an automatic bid to the NCAA tournament where they lost in the second round to Gonzaga.

== Roster ==
Number	Name	Position	Height	Weight	Year	Hometown
0	Brian Ishola	Guard	6–5	210	Freshman	Woodbury, Minnesota
2	Paul Miller	Guard	6–4	185	Freshman	Waukesha, Wisconsin
3	Jake Showalter	Guard	6–2	190	Freshman	Germantown, Wisconsin
3	Zach Checkal	Guard	6–3	200	Sophomore	Delano, Minnesota
12	Lawrence Alexander	Guard	6–3	190	Senior	Peoria, Illinois
13	Carlin Dupree	Guard	6–3	190	Sophomore	Milwaukee, Wisconsin
21	A.J. Jacobson	Guard	6–6	215	RS–Freshman	Fargo, North Dakota
22	Kory Brown	Guard	6–4	205	Junior	Hoffman Estates, Illinois
24	Trey Miller	Guard/Forward	6–7	195	Freshman	Woodinville, Washington
30	Spencer Eliason	Forward	6–9	235	Freshman	Chadron, Nebraska
32	Evan Wesenberg	Forward	6–7	205	Freshman	Germantown, Wisconsin
34	Chris Kading	Forward	6–8	240	Junior	De Pere, Wisconsin
40	Dexter Werner	Forward	6–6	235	RS–Sophomore	Bismarck, North Dakota

== Schedule ==
Date time, TV	Rank^{#}	Opponent^{#}	Result	Record	Site (attendance) city, state
Exhibition
11/05/2014*; 7:00 pm		Minot State	W 81–69		Scheels Arena (1,434); Fargo, ND
Regular season
11/14/2014*; 7:30 pm, LHN		at No. 10 Texas; 2K Sports Classic	L 50–85	0–1	Frank Erwin Center (11,232); Austin, TX
11/17/2014*; 7:00 pm, BTN		at Iowa; 2K Sports Classic	L 56–87	0–2	Carver–Hawkeye Arena (12,333); Iowa City, IA
11/21/2014*; 7:00 pm		Kennesaw State; 2K Sports Classic	W 68–55	1–2	Scheels Arena (2,014); Fargo, ND
11/22/2014*; 7:00 pm		Hampton; 2K Sports Classic	W 74–66	2–2	Scheels Arena (1,437); Fargo, ND
11/25/2014*; 7:00 pm		Minnesota–Crookston	W 64–63	3–2	Scheels Arena (980); Fargo, ND
11/30/2014*; 6:00 pm		at Montana State	W 72–51	4–2	Worthington Arena (1,188); Bozeman, MT
12/03/2014*; 7:30 pm		at Southern Miss	L 65–78	4–3	Reed Green Coliseum (3,083); Hattiesburg, MS
12/07/2014*; 8:00 pm		at Montana	L 57–69	4–4	Dahlberg Arena (2,752); Missoula, MT
12/13/2014*; 7:00 pm, NBCND		North Dakota	W 71–42	5–4	Scheels Arena (4,189); Fargo, ND
12/16/2014*; 7:00 pm, MeTV ND		Akron	W 55–46	6–4	Scheels Arena (1,129); Fargo, ND
12/21/2014*; 4:00 pm		vs. Kent State; Sun Bowl Invitational	L 52–53	6–5	Don Haskins Center (5,790); El Paso, TX
12/22/2014*; 6:00 pm		vs. Alcorn State; Sun Bowl Invitational	W 61–50	7–5	Don Haskins Center (6,290); El Paso, TX
12/28/2014*; 2:00 pm		Northland (WI)	W 83–59	8–5	Scheels Arena (918); Fargo, ND
01/02/2015; 7:00 pm, Midco/ESPN3		Oral Roberts	W 72–66	9–5 (1–0)	Scheels Arena (2,610); Fargo, ND
01/04/2015; 4:00 pm, Midco/ESPN3		South Dakota State	W 72–69	10–5 (2–0)	Scheels Arena (3,368); Fargo, ND
01/08/2015; 7:00 pm, Midco/ESPN3		at Omaha	W 75–72	11–5 (3–0)	Ralston Arena (1,243); Ralston, NE
01/14/2015; 7:00 pm, MeTV ND		at South Dakota	L 67–71	11–6 (3–1)	DakotaDome (1,863); Vermillion, SD
01/16/2015; 7:00 pm, MeTV ND		Western Illinois	W 61–48	12–6 (4–1)	Scheels Arena (3,149); Fargo, ND
01/22/2015; 7:00 pm, HTSN/ESPN3		at IUPUI	W 69–61 ^{OT}	13–6 (5–1)	Indiana Farmers Coliseum (1,224); Indianapolis, IN
01/24/2015; 5:00 pm, PBS 39		at IPFW	L 71–77	13–7 (5–2)	Gates Sports Center (1,839); Fort Wayne, IN
01/29/2015; 7:00 pm, MeTV ND		Denver	W 61–54 ^{OT}	14–7 (6–2)	Scheels Arena (2,555); Fargo, ND
02/01/2015; 2:00 pm		at Western Illinois	W 64–62	15–7 (7–2)	Western Hall (530); Macomb, IL
02/05/2015; 7:00 pm, MeTV ND		Omaha	W 64–57	16–7 (8–2)	Scheels Arena (2,544); Fargo, ND
02/07/2015; 2:00 pm, MeTV ND		South Dakota	W 71–47	17–7 (9–2)	Scheels Arena (3,420); Fargo, ND
02/12/2015; 9:00 pm, RTRM		at Denver	W 73–69 ^{OT}	18–7 (10–2)	Magness Arena (1,469); Denver, CO
02/14/2015; 4:00 pm, Midco/ESPN3		at South Dakota State	L 58–68	18–8 (10–3)	Frost Arena (4,912); Brookings, SD
02/19/2015; 7:00 pm, MeTV ND		IUPUI	W 57–48	19–8 (11–3)	Scheels Arena (2,543); Fargo, ND
02/21/2015; 2:00 pm, Midco/ESPN3		IPFW	W 66–62	20–8 (12–3)	Scheels Arena (4,318); Fargo, ND
02/26/2015; 7:00 pm, ESPN3		at Oral Roberts	L 58–74	20–9 (12–4)	Mabee Center (3,908); Tulsa, OK
The Summit League tournament
03/07/2015; 8:30 pm, Midco/ESPN3		vs. Denver; Quarterfinals	W 61–50	21–9	Denny Sanford PREMIER Center (9,773); Sioux Falls, SD
03/09/2015; 8:30 pm, ESPN3		vs. Oral Roberts; Semifinals	W 60–56	22–9	Denny Sanford PREMIER Center (10,153); Sioux Falls, SD
03/10/2015; 8:00 pm, ESPN2		vs. South Dakota State; Championship game	W 57–56	23–9	Denny Sanford PREMIER Center (9,033); Sioux Falls, SD
NCAA tournament
03/20/2015*; 8:50 pm, TNT	No. (15 S)	vs. No. 7 (2 S) Gonzaga; Second round	L 76–86	23–10	KeyArena (14,852); Seattle, WA
*Non-conference game. ^{#}Rankings from AP Poll. (#) Tournament seedings in parentheses. All times are in Central Time. (#) during NCAA Tournament is seed with Region S=South.
