= 2014–15 Western Illinois Leathernecks men's basketball team =

American college basketball season

2014–15 Western Illinois Leathernecks men's basketball
- Conference: Summit League
- Record: 8–20 (3–13 The Summit)
- Head coach: Billy Wright (1st season)
- Assistant coaches: Wade Hokenson; Josh Wolfe; Damon James
- Home arena: Western Hall

2014–15 Summit League men's basketball standings
	Conf.				Overall
Team	W		L	PCT	W		L	PCT
North Dakota State †	12	–	4	.750	23	–	10	.697
South Dakota State	12	–	4	.750	24	–	11	.686
Oral Roberts	10	–	6	.625	19	–	15	.559
IPFW	9	–	7	.563	16	–	15	.516
South Dakota	9	–	7	.563	17	–	16	.515
Denver	6	–	10	.375	12	–	18	.400
IUPUI	6	–	10	.375	10	–	21	.323
Omaha*	5	–	11	.313	12	–	17	.414
Western Illinois	3	–	13	.188	8	–	20	.286
† 2015 Summit League Tournament winner *ineligible for postseason play due to Div. I transition

The 2014–15 Western Illinois Leathernecks men's basketball team represented Western Illinois University during the 2014–15 NCAA Division I men's basketball season. The Leathernecks, led by first year head coach Billy Wright, played their home games at Western Hall and were members of The Summit League. They finished the season 8–20, 3–13 in Summit League play to finish in last place. They lost in the quarterfinals of The Summit League tournament to South Dakota State.

== Roster ==
Number	Name	Position	Height	Weight	Year	Hometown
1	Jabari Sandifer	Guard	6–1	170	Sophomore	Naperville, Illinois
3	Kam Rowan	Guard	6–0	170	Freshman	Champaign, Illinois
5	Kendall Rollins	Forward	6–7	180	Freshman	Indianapolis
10	Jamie Batish	Guard	6–4	190	Junior	Melbourne, Australia
11	DeVante Mayes	Guard	6–0	160	Freshman	Peoria, Illinois
12	Tyson Reynold	Forward	6–9	220	Junior	Queens, New York
14	J. C. Fuller	Guard	6–3	180	Junior	Sioux City, Iowa
15	Dalan Ancrum	Guard/Forward	6–5	175	Freshman	Round Rock, Texas
22	Jalen Morgan	Forward	6–8	202	Freshman	Indianapolis
24	Remy Roberts-Burnett	Guard	6–0	180	Senior	Joliet, Illinois
30	Mike Miklusak	Forward	6–6	190	Sophomore	Dyer, Indiana
31	Garret Covington	Forward	6–5	180	Sophomore	Edwardsville, Illinois
32	Tate Stensgaard	Forward	6–8	190	Junior	Rapid City, South Dakota
33	Jalen Chapman	Forward	6–8	220	Junior	The Bronx, New York
34	Mohamed Conde	Forward	6–7	200	Senior	Belleville, Michigan

== Schedule ==
Date time, TV	Opponent	Result	Record	Site (attendance) city, state
Exhibition
11/08/2014*; 3:00 pm	Cornell College	W 82–48		Western Hall; Macomb, Illinois
Regular season
11/14/2014*; 7:00 pm	Pacific	L 71–73	0–1	Western Hall (1,323); Macomb, Illinois
11/17/2014*; 7:00 pm, ESPN3	at UIC	L 64–67	0–2	UIC Pavilion (5,575); Chicago
11/22/2014*; 7:00 pm	Southeastern Louisiana	W 60–57	1–2	Western Hall (978); Macomb, Illinois
11/25/2014*; 6:00 pm	at William & Mary	L 49–83	1–3	Kaplan Arena (1,913); Williamsburg, Virginia
11/29/2014*; 7:00 pm	Greenville	W 91–56	2–3	Western Hall (1,014); Macomb, Illinois
12/04/2014*; 6:00 pm	at Akron	L 49–73	2–4	James A. Rhodes Arena (2,523); Akron, Ohio
12/07/2014*; 12:00 pm, ESPN3	at Cleveland State	L 54–76	2–5	Wolstein Center (1,187); Cleveland, Ohio
12/11/2014*; 7:00 pm	Idaho	W 78–75	3–5	Western Hall (1,053); Macomb, Illinois
12/13/2014*; 7:00 pm	Alabama State	W 78–68	4–5	Western Hall (1,277); Macomb, Illinois
12/23/2014*; 7:00 pm, ESPN3	at Memphis	L 51–78	4–6	FedExForum (12,995); Memphis, Tennessee
12/30/2014*; 7:00 pm	Anderson (IN)	L 62–74	5–6	Western Hall (871); Macomb, Illinois
01/02/2015; 7:00 pm	IPFW	W 73–67	6–6 (1–0)	Western Hall (679); Macomb, Illinois
01/04/2015; 1:00 pm	Omaha	W 80–78	7–6 (2–0)	Western Hall (654); Macomb, Illinois
01/07/2015; 7:00 pm	at South Dakota State	L 44–75	7–7 (2–1)	Frost Arena (1,407); Brookings, South Dakota
01/10/2015; 7:00 pm	Oral Roberts	L 57–66	7–8 (2–2)	Western Hall (1,314); Macomb, Illinois
01/14/2015; 8:00 pm	at Denver	L 54–68	7–9 (2–3)	Magness Arena (1,003); Denver, Colorado
01/16/2015; 7:00 pm, MeTV ND	at North Dakota State	L 48–61	7–10 (2–4)	Scheels Arena (3,149); Fargo, North Dakota
01/22/2015; 7:00 pm	South Dakota	L 58–68	7–11 (2–5)	Western Hall (1,126); Macomb, Illinois
01/30/2015; 7:00 pm	IUPUI	W 63–59	8–11 (3–5)	Western Hall (1,294); Macomb, Illinois
02/01/2015; 2:00 pm	North Dakota State	L 62–64	8–12 (3–6)	Western Hall (530); Macomb, Illinois
02/05/2015; 7:00 pm, Midco/ESPN3	at South Dakota	L 61–75	8–13 (3–7)	DakotaDome (1,418); Vermillion, South Dakota
02/12/2015; 7:00 pm, ESPN3	at Oral Roberts	L 67–77	8–14 (3–8)	Mabee Center (3,281); Tulsa, Oklahoma
02/14/2015; 7:00 pm	at Omaha	L 58–77	8–15 (3–9)	Ralston Arena (1,108); Ralston, Nebraska
02/18/2015; 7:00 pm	South Dakota State	L 77–79	8–16 (3–10)	Western Hall (1,139); Macomb, Illinois
02/21/2015; 7:00 pm	Denver	L 46–59	8–17 (3–11)	Western Hall (2,154); Macomb, Illinois
02/26/2015; 6:00 pm, HTSN/ESPN3	at IUPUI	L 66–71	8–18 (3–12)	Indiana Farmers Coliseum (1,134); Indianapolis
02/28/2015; 6:00 pm, PBS 39	at IPFW	L 64–84	8–19 (3–13)	Gates Sports Center (1,218); Fort Wayne, Indiana
The Summit League tournament
03/07/2015; 6:00 pm, Midco/ESPN3	vs. South Dakota State; Quarterfinals	L 50–87	8–20	Denny Sanford PREMIER Center (9,773); Sioux Falls, South Dakota
*Non-conference game. ^{#}Rankings from AP Poll. (#) Tournament seedings in parentheses. All times are in Central Time.
