= 2014–15 IPFW Mastodons men's basketball team =

American college basketball season

2014–15 Fort Wayne Mastodons men's basketball
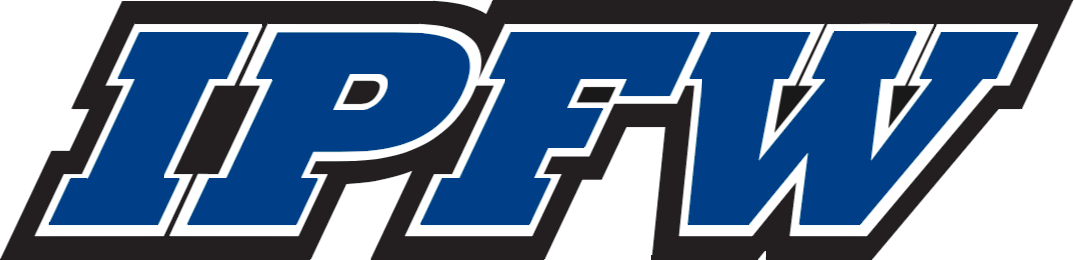

CIT, First round
- Conference: The Summit League
- Record: 16–15 (9–7 The Summit)
- Head coach: Jon Coffman (1st season)
- Assistant coaches: Ben Betts; Ryan Sims; Ben Botts
- Home arena: Gates Sports Center; Allen County War Memorial Coliseum

2014–15 Summit League men's basketball standings
	Conf.				Overall
Team	W		L	PCT	W		L	PCT
North Dakota State †	12	–	4	.750	23	–	10	.697
South Dakota State	12	–	4	.750	24	–	11	.686
Oral Roberts	10	–	6	.625	19	–	15	.559
IPFW	9	–	7	.563	16	–	15	.516
South Dakota	9	–	7	.563	17	–	16	.515
Denver	6	–	10	.375	12	–	18	.400
IUPUI	6	–	10	.375	10	–	21	.323
Omaha*	5	–	11	.313	12	–	17	.414
Western Illinois	3	–	13	.188	8	–	20	.286
† 2015 Summit League Tournament winner *ineligible for postseason play due to Div. I transition

The 2014–15 Fort Wayne Mastodons men's basketball team represented Indiana University – Purdue University Fort Wayne during the 2014–15 NCAA Division I men's basketball season. The Mastodons, led by first year head coach Jon Coffman, played their home games at the Gates Sports Center, with one home game at the Allen County War Memorial Coliseum, and were members of The Summit League. They finished the season 16–15, 9–7 in Summit League play to finish in a tie for fourth place. They lost in the quarterfinals of The Summit League tournament to South Dakota. They were invited to the CollegeInsider.com Tournament where they lost in the first round to Evansville

== Roster ==
Number	Name	Position	Height	Weight	Year	Hometown
0	Mo Evans	Guard	6–0	180	Sophomore	Indianapolis, Indiana
3	Herbert Graham	Guard	6–4	195	Junior	North Miami Beach, Florida
4	John Konchar	Guard	6–4		Freshman	Chicago, Illinois
10	Max Landis	Guard	6–2	175	Junior	Indianapolis, Indiana
11	Isaiah McCray	Guard	6–0	180	Senior	Baltimore, Maryland
14	Nick Moschetti	Guard	6–4		Freshman	Perrysburg, Ohio
15	Gage Davis	Guard	6–2		Freshman	Chicago, Illinois
21	Trevor Osborn	Guard	5–11	155	Sophomore	Fort Wayne, Indiana
23	Kevin Harden	Guard	6–2	180	Senior	Orlando, Florida
32	Jure Gunjina	Forward	6–8		Junior	Zagreb, Croatia
44	Joe Reed	Forward	6–8	220	Junior	Greenwood, Indiana
50	Brent Calhoun	Forward	6–8	280	Sophomore	Indianapolis, Indiana
53	Joe Edwards	Guard	6–4	195	Senior	Chicago, Illinois
54	Steve Forbes	Forward	6–9	295	Senior	Clermont, Florida

== Schedule ==
Date time, TV	Opponent	Result	Record	Site (attendance) city, state
Exhibition
11/09/2014*; 2:00 pm	Olivet	W 110–79		Gates Sports Center (751); Fort Wayne, IN
Regular season
11/14/2014*; 7:00 pm	Manchester	W 74–50	1–0	Gates Sports Center (1,090); Fort Wayne, IN
11/17/2014*; 8:00 pm	at SIU Edwardsville	W 74–71	2–0	Vadalabene Center (1,216); Edwardsville, IL
11/21/2014*; 7:00 pm, ESPN3	at Georgia Tech	L 69–78	2–1	Hank McCamish Pavilion (5,297); Atlanta, GA
11/24/2014*; 7:00 pm	Jacksonville	W 89–71	3–1	Allen County War Memorial Coliseum (1,808); Fort Wayne, IN
11/28/2014*; 3:00 pm	at Dartmouth	L 67–68	3–2	Leede Arena (1,261); Hanover, NH
12/03/2014*; 7:00 pm, ESPN3	at Stetson	W 87–76	4–2	Edmunds Center (780); DeLand, FL
12/06/2014*; 7:00 pm	Miami (OH)	W 86–78	5–2	Gates Sports Center (1,246); Fort Wayne, IN
12/08/2014*; 7:00 pm, ESPNU	at Purdue	L 43–63	5–3	Mackey Arena (10,007); West Lafayette, IN
12/11/2014*; 7:00 pm	UM–Dearborn	W 91–67	6–3	Gates Sports Center (959); Fort Wayne, IN
12/20/2014*; 7:00 pm, PBS 39	Valparaiso	L 72–75	6–4	Gates Sports Center (1,249); Fort Wayne, IN
12/22/2014*; 7:00 pm	at Illinois State	L 43–68	6–5	Redbird Arena (4,108); Normal, IL
12/28/2014*; 7:00 pm	Judson	W 80–46	7–5	Gates Sports Center (1,108); Fort Wayne, IN
12/30/2014*; 8:00 pm	Cal Poly	L 57–71	7–6	Gates Sports Center (1,235); Fort Wayne, IN
01/02/2015; 8:00 pm	at Western Illinois	L 67–73	7–7 (0–1)	Western Hall (679); Macomb, IL
01/04/2015; 7:00 pm	IUPUI	L 58–63	7–8 (0–2)	Gates Sports Center (1,048); Fort Wayne, IN
01/08/2015; 7:00 pm	Denver	W 69–53	8–8 (1–2)	Gates Sports Center (683); Fort Wayne, IN
01/10/2015; 7:00 pm, PBS 39	South Dakota	L 62–64	8–9 (1–3)	Gates Sports Center (1,153); Fort Wayne, IN
01/17/2015; 8:00 pm, ESPN3	at Oral Roberts	L 58–62	8–10 (1–4)	Mabee Center (3,404); Tulsa, OK
01/21/2015; 8:00 pm, Midco/ESPN3	at South Dakota State	L 53–82	8–11 (1–5)	Frost Arena (2,394); Brookings, SD
01/24/2015; 6:00 pm, PBS 39	North Dakota State	W 77–71	9–11 (2–5)	Gates Sports Center (1,839); Fort Wayne, IN
01/29/2015; 8:00 pm, Midco/ESPN3	at South Dakota	W 66–55	10–11 (3–5)	DakotaDome (1,526); Vermillion, SD
01/31/2015; 2:00 pm	at Omaha	W 75–65	11–11 (4–5)	Ralston Arena (1,109); Ralston, NE
02/05/2015; 7:00 pm	South Dakota State	W 84–74	12–11 (5–5)	Gates Sports Center (804); Fort Wayne, IN
02/07/2015; 8:00 pm, PBS 39	Oral Roberts	W 75–69	13–11 (6–5)	Gates Sports Center (1,068); Fort Wayne, IN
02/11/2015; 7:00 pm, HTSN/ESPN3	at IUPUI	W 69–54	14–11 (7–5)	Indiana Farmers Coliseum (1,734); Indianapolis, IN
02/19/2015; 9:00 pm	at Denver	W 63–47	15–11 (8–5)	Magness Arena (1,378); Denver, CO
02/21/2015; 3:00 pm, MeTV ND	at North Dakota State	L 62–66	15–12 (8–6)	Scheels Arena (4,318); Fargo, ND
02/26/2015; 7:00 pm	Omaha	L 67–73	15–13 (8–7)	Gates Sports Center (1,015); Fort Wayne, IN
02/28/2015; 7:00 pm, PBS 39	Western Illinois	W 84–64	16–13 (9–7)	Gates Sports Center (1,218); Fort Wayne, IN
The Summit League tournament
03/08/2015; 7:00 pm, Midco/ESPN3	vs. South Dakota; Quarterfinals	L 73–82	16–14	Denny Sanford PREMIER Center (6,653); Sioux Falls, SD
CIT
03/18/2015*; 8:00 pm	at Evansville; First round	L 77–82	16–15	Ford Center (1,826); Evansville, IN
*Non-conference game. (#) Tournament seedings in parentheses. All times are in Eastern Time.
