= 2014–15 Oral Roberts Golden Eagles men's basketball team =

American college basketball season

2014–15 Oral Roberts Golden Eagles men's basketball

CBI, Second round
- Conference: The Summit League
- Record: 19–15 (10–6 The Summit)
- Head coach: Scott Sutton (16th season)
- Assistant coaches: Kyan Brown; Wade Mason; Sean Sutton
- Home arena: Mabee Center

2014–15 Summit League men's basketball standings
	Conf.				Overall
Team	W		L	PCT	W		L	PCT
North Dakota State †	12	–	4	.750	23	–	10	.697
South Dakota State	12	–	4	.750	24	–	11	.686
Oral Roberts	10	–	6	.625	19	–	15	.559
IPFW	9	–	7	.563	16	–	15	.516
South Dakota	9	–	7	.563	17	–	16	.515
Denver	6	–	10	.375	12	–	18	.400
IUPUI	6	–	10	.375	10	–	21	.323
Omaha*	5	–	11	.313	12	–	17	.414
Western Illinois	3	–	13	.188	8	–	20	.286
† 2015 Summit League Tournament winner *ineligible for postseason play due to Div. I transition

The 2014–15 Oral Roberts Golden Eagles men's basketball team represented Oral Roberts University during the 2014–15 NCAA Division I men's basketball season. The Golden Eagles were led by 16th year head coach Scott Sutton and played their home games at the Mabee Center. They were members of The Summit League. They returned to The Summit after only two seasons in the Southland Conference. They finished the season 19–15, 10–6 in The Summit League play to finish in third place. They advanced to the semifinals of The Summit League tournament, where they lost to North Dakota State. They were invited to the College Basketball Invitational, where they defeated UC Santa Barbara in the first round before losing in the second round to Loyola–Chicago.

== Roster ==
Number	Name	Position	Height	Weight	Year	Hometown
0	Aaron Young	Guard	5–11	165	Sophomore	Edmond, Oklahoma
1	Bobby Word	Guard	6–4	170	Sophomore	Lancaster, Texas
3	Jabbar Singleton	Guard	6–0	190	Sophomore	New Orleans, Louisiana
5	Brandon Conley	Forward	6–6	225	Junior	Fort Worth, Texas
12	Jackson Bart	Forward	6–5	190	Freshman	Bartlesville, Oklahoma
15	Obi Emegano	Guard	6–3	215	Redshirt junior	Edmond, Oklahoma
22	Adrion Webber	Forward	6–5	210	Senior	Muskogee, Oklahoma
23	Dederick Lee	Guard	6–2	165	Redshirt freshman	Clarksville, Arkansas
24	Korey Billbury	Guard	6–3	200	Redshirt junior	Tulsa, Oklahoma
33	Darian Harris	Guard	6–6	195	Redshirt freshman	Springdale, Arkansas
34	Denell Henderson	Forward	6–7	235	Senior	Damascus, Arkansas
35	Drew Wilson	Forward	6–7	220	Redshirt junior	Tulsa, Oklahoma
44	Albert Owens	Center	6–9	260	Freshman	Cedar Hill, Texas

== Schedule ==
Date time, TV	Opponent	Result	Record	Site (attendance) city, state
Exhibition
11/03/2014*; 7:00 pm	East Central	W 75–68		Mabee Center (2,102); Tulsa, OK
11/08/2014*; 7:00 pm	Rogers State	W 73–60		Mabee Center (2,706); Tulsa, OK
Regular season
11/15/2014*; 7:00 pm, ESPN3	Tulsa; PSO Mayors Cup/MGM Grand Main Event	W 77–68	1–0	Mabee Center (6,534); Tulsa, OK
11/19/2014*; 7:00 pm, SECN+	at Missouri	L 64–78	1–1	Mizzou Arena (5,563); Columbia, MO
11/21/2014*; 8:00 pm, P12N	at Oregon State; MGM Grand Main Event	L 42–55	1–2	Gill Coliseum (4,022); Corvallis, OR
11/25/2014*; 8:00 pm	vs. Louisiana–Lafayette; MGM Grand Main Event	L 52–76	1–3	MGM Grand Garden Arena (N/A); Paradise, NV
11/26/2014*; 3:00 pm	vs. Milwaukee; MGM Grand Main Event	W 69–66	2–3	MGM Grand Garden Arena (1,712); Paradise, NV
12/01/2014*; 8:00 pm	at Weber State	L 61–62	2–4	Dee Events Center (5,633); Ogden, UT
12/07/2014*; 3:00 pm, ESPN3	Missouri State			Mabee Center; Tulsa, OK
12/13/2014*; 7:00 pm, ESPN3	New Mexico State	W 86–83	3–4	Mabee Center (3,494); Tulsa, OK
12/15/2014*; 8:00 pm, ESPN3	Missouri State	W 80–61	4–4	Mabee Center (2,567); Tulsa, OK
12/16/2014*; 7:00 pm, ESPNU	at No. 15 Oklahoma	L 53–85	4–5	Lloyd Noble Center (9,713); Norman, OK
12/20/2014*; 2:00 pm, CBSSN	at Memphis	L 63–78	4–6	FedExForum (13,084); Memphis, TN
12/22/2014*; 7:00 pm	at Missouri State	L 45–52	4–7	JQH Arena (5,327); Springfield, MO
12/28/2014*; 3:00 pm	Haskell Indian Nations	W 94–42	5–7	Mabee Center (3,184); Tulsa, OK
12/30/2014*; 6:00 pm	at Detroit	W 77–73 ^{OT}	6–7	Calihan Hall (2,164); Detroit, MI
01/02/2015; 7:00 pm, ESPN3	at North Dakota State	L 66–72	6–8 (0–1)	Scheels Arena (2,610); Fargo, ND
01/07/2015; 7:00 pm, ESPN3	IUPUI	W 69–61	7–8 (1–1)	Mabee Center (2,836); Tulsa, OK
01/10/2015; 7:00 pm, ESPN3	at Western Illinois	W 66–57	8–8 (2–1)	Western Hall (1,314); Macomb, IL
01/14/2015; 7:00 pm, ESPN3	Omaha	W 102–86	9–8 (3–1)	Mabee Center (2,884); Tulsa, OK
01/17/2015; 7:00 pm, ESPN3	IPFW	W 62–58	10–8 (4–1)	Mabee Center (3,404); Tulsa, OK
01/21/2015; 7:00 pm, RTNW	at Denver	L 66–73	10–9 (4–2)	Magness Arena (1,482); Denver, CO
01/24/2015; 7:00 pm, ESPN3	South Dakota State	L 72–76	10–10 (4–3)	Mabee Center (4,509); Tulsa, OK
01/27/2015*; 7:00 pm	Tabor	W 94–53	11–10	Mabee Center (2,398); Tulsa, OK
01/31/2015; 4:30 pm	at South Dakota	W 73–72	12–10 (5–3)	DakotaDome (2,064); Vermillion, SD
02/05/2015; 6:00 pm, ESPN3	at IUPUI	W 78–68	13–10 (6–3)	Indiana Farmers Coliseum (1,184); Indianapolis, IN
02/07/2015; 7:00 pm, PBS39	at IPFW	L 69–75	13–11 (6–4)	Gates Sports Center (1,068); Fort Wayne, IN
02/12/2015; 7:00 pm, ESPN3	Western Illinois	W 77–67	14–11 (7–4)	Mabee Center (3,281); Tulsa, OK
02/14/2015; 7:00 pm, ESPN3	South Dakota	L 70–83	14–12 (7–5)	Mabee Center (4,005); Tulsa, OK
02/19/2015; 7:00 pm	at Omaha	W 81–78	15–12 (8–5)	Ralston Arena (2,209); Ralston, NE
02/21/2015; 7:00 pm, ESPN3	at South Dakota State	L 52–81	15–13 (8–6)	Frost Arena (5,347); Brookings, SD
02/26/2015; 7:00 pm, ESPN3	North Dakota State	W 74–58	16–13 (9–6)	Mabee Center (3,908); Tulsa, OK
02/28/2015; 7:00 pm, ESPN3	Denver	W 60–57	17–13 (10–6)	Mabee Center (3,720); Tulsa, OK
The Summit League tournament
03/08/2015; 8:30 pm, ESPN3	vs. IUPUI; Quarterfinals	W 60–57	18–13	Denny Sanford PREMIER Center (3,720); Sioux Falls, SD
03/09/2015; 8:30 pm, ESPN3	vs. North Dakota State; Semifinals	L 56–60	18–14	Denny Sanford PREMIER Center (10,153); Sioux Falls, SD
College Basketball Invitational
03/18/2015*; 7:00 pm	UC Santa Barbara; First round	W 91–87	19–14	Mabee Center (1,687); Tulsa, OK
03/23/2015*; 7:00 pm	at Loyola–Chicago; Quarterfinals	L 78–86	19–15	Joseph J. Gentile Arena (1,225); Chicago, IL
*Non-conference game. ^{#}Rankings from AP Poll. (#) Tournament seedings in parentheses. All times are in Central Time.

* The December 7 game vs Missouri State was postponed due to a power outage.
