= 2014–15 IUPUI Jaguars men's basketball team =

American college basketball season

2014–15 IUPUI Jaguars men's basketball
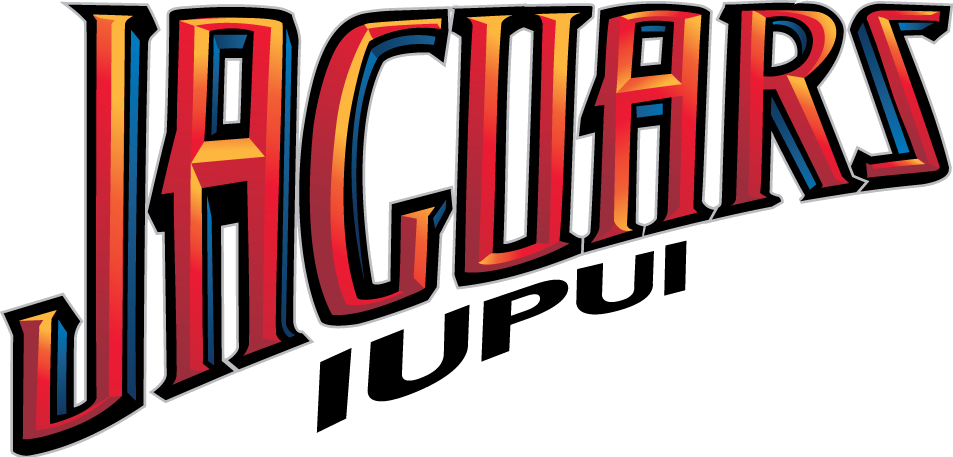
- Conference: The Summit League
- Record: 10–21 (6–10 The Summit)
- Head coach: Jason Gardner (1st season)
- Assistant coaches: Matt Crenshaw; Jon-Michael Nickerson; Scott Gillespie
- Home arena: Indiana Farmers Coliseum

2014–15 Summit League men's basketball standings
	Conf.				Overall
Team	W		L	PCT	W		L	PCT
North Dakota State †	12	–	4	.750	23	–	10	.697
South Dakota State	12	–	4	.750	24	–	11	.686
Oral Roberts	10	–	6	.625	19	–	15	.559
IPFW	9	–	7	.563	16	–	15	.516
South Dakota	9	–	7	.563	17	–	16	.515
Denver	6	–	10	.375	12	–	18	.400
IUPUI	6	–	10	.375	10	–	21	.323
Omaha*	5	–	11	.313	12	–	17	.414
Western Illinois	3	–	13	.188	8	–	20	.286
† 2015 Summit League Tournament winner *ineligible for postseason play due to Div. I transition

The 2014–15 IUPUI Jaguars men's basketball team represented Indiana University – Purdue University Indianapolis during the 2014–15 NCAA Division I men's basketball season. The Jaguars, led by first year head coach Jason Gardner, played their home games at Fairgrounds Coliseum, which was renamed Indiana Farmers Coliseum on December 2, and were members of The Summit League. They finished the season 10–21, 6–10 in Summit League play to finish in a tie for sixth place. They lost in the quarterfinals of The Summit League tournament to Oral Roberts.

== Roster ==
Number	Name	Position	Height	Weight	Year	Hometown
0	Darell Combs	Guard	6–2	175	Junior	Chicago, Illinois
1	Khufu Najee	Guard	6–4	190	Senior	Berkeley, California
2	Mason Archie, II	Guard	6–5	185	Junior	Indianapolis, Indiana
5	Leo Svete	Guard	6–5	200	RS–Freshman	Granger, Indiana
10	Jalen McCallum	Guard	5–9	160	Sophomore	Marion, Indiana
11	Josh James	Forward/Center	6–9	225	Sophomore	Cedar Lake, Indiana
12	Justus Stanback	Forward	6–8	220	Sophomore	West Lafayette, Indiana
14	Elijah Ray	Forward	6–6	232	Sophomore	Gary, Indiana
15	DavRon Williams	Forward	6–7	225	Senior	Marion, Indiana
15	Matt O'Leary	Forward	6–8	225	Junior	Terre Haute, Indiana
22	Marcellus Barksdale	Guard/Forward	6–5	210	Junior	Lexington, Kentucky
25	P.J. Boutte	Guard	5–9	160	Junior	Indianapolis, Indiana
31	John Hubler	Guard	6–5	185	Freshman	Whiteland, Indiana
32	D.J. McCall	Guard	6–5	180	Freshman	Fort Wayne, Indiana
33	Nick Osborne	Forward	6–8	220	Junior	Muncie, Indiana
45	Aaron Brennan	Forward	6–6	200	Freshman	Noblesville, Indiana

== Schedule ==
Date time, TV	Opponent	Result	Record	Site (attendance) city, state
Exhibition
11/05/2014*; 7:00 pm	IU South Bend	W 80–60		Fairgrounds Coliseum (1,093); Indianapolis, IN
Regular season
11/14/2014*; 8:00 pm	Indiana State	L 66–79 ^{OT}	0–1	Fairgrounds Coliseum (3,159); Indianapolis, IN
11/16/2014*; 3:00 pm, BTN	at Purdue	L 57–77	0–2	Mackey Arena (11,466); West Lafayette, IN
11/19/2014*; 8:00 pm, ESPN3	at Milwaukee	W 70–68	1–2	UW–Milwaukee Panther Arena (2,019); Milwaukee, WI
11/22/2014*; 1:00 pm, HTSN	Ball State	W 71–69 ^{OT}	2–2	Fairgrounds Coliseum (1,952); Indianapolis, IN
11/25/2014*; 8:00 pm	at Drake	L 60–73	2–3	Knapp Center (3,108); Des Moines, IA
11/29/2014*; 1:00 pm, HTSN	Georgia State	L 63–66	2–4	Fairgrounds Coliseum (1,554); Indianapolis, IN
12/06/2014*; 8:00 pm	at Evansville	L 62–89	2–5	Ford Center (3,889); Evansville, IN
12/09/2014*; 7:00 pm, FS1	at Xavier	L 43–66	2–6	Cintas Center (9,634); Cincinnati, OH
12/13/2014*; 1:00 pm, HTSN	Eastern Kentucky	L 64–73	2–7	Indiana Farmers Coliseum (1,096); Indianapolis, IN
12/15/2014*; 6:00 pm	at Howard; Gotham Classic	L 47–57	2–8	Burr Gymnasium (57); Washington, D.C.
12/20/2014*; 1:00 pm, HTSN	South Alabama; Gotham Classic	W 71–65	3–8	Indiana Farmers Coliseum (1,582); Indianapolis, IN
12/23/2014*; 12:00 pm	at Richmond; Gotham Classic	L 53–57	3–9	Robins Center (4,483); Richmond, VA
12/27/2014*; 4:00 pm	at Pepperdine; Gotham Classic	W 55–53	4–9	Firestone Fieldhouse (903); Malibu, CA
12/29/2014*; 7:00 pm	at North Carolina Central	L 49–70	4–10	McLendon–McDougald Gymnasium (822); Durham, NC
01/04/2015; 7:00 pm	at IPFW	W 63–58	5–10 (1–0)	Gates Sports Center (1,048); Fort Wayne, IN
01/07/2015; 8:00 pm, ESPN3	at Oral Roberts	L 61–69	5–11 (1–1)	Mabee Center (2,836); Tulsa, OK
01/10/2015; 1:00 pm, HTSN	Denver	W 52–49	6–11 (2–1)	Indiana Farmers Coliseum (1,151); Indianapolis, IN
01/14/2015; 8:00 pm	at South Dakota State	L 53–68	6–12 (2–2)	Frost Arena (2,583); Brookings, SD
01/18/2015; 2:00 pm	at Omaha	W 89–84	7–12 (3–2)	Ralston Arena (1,157); Ralston, NE
01/22/2015; 8:00 pm, HTSN	North Dakota State	L 61–69 ^{OT}	7–13 (3–3)	Indiana Farmers Coliseum (1,224); Indianapolis, IN
01/24/2015; 1:00 pm, HTSN	South Dakota	W 65–50	8–13 (4–3)	Indiana Farmers Coliseum (1,320); Indianapolis, IN
01/30/2015; 8:00 pm	at Western Illinois	L 59–63	8–14 (4–4)	Western Hall (1,294); Macomb, IL
02/05/2015; 7:00 pm, HTSN	Oral Roberts	L 68–78	8–15 (4–5)	Indiana Farmers Coliseum (1,184); Indianapolis, IN
02/07/2015; 1:00 pm, HTSN	South Dakota State	L 56–63	8–16 (4–6)	Indiana Farmers Coliseum (1,386); Indianapolis, IN
02/11/2015; 7:00 pm, HTSN	IPFW	L 54–69	8–17 (4–7)	Indiana Farmers Coliseum (1,734); Indianapolis, IN
02/14/2015; 6:00 pm	at Denver	W 54–53	9–17 (5–7)	Magness Arena (2,030); Denver, CO
02/19/2015; 8:00 pm, MeTV ND	at North Dakota State	L 48–57	9–18 (5–8)	Scheels Arena (2,543); Fargo, ND
02/21/2015; 3:00 pm	at South Dakota	L 62–77	9–19 (5–9)	DakotaDome (1,723); Vermillion, SD
02/26/2015; 7:00 pm, HTSN	Western Illinois	W 71–66	10–19 (6–9)	Indiana Farmers Coliseum (1,134); Indianapolis, IN
02/28/2015; 1:00 pm, HTSN	Omaha	L 80–87 ^{2OT}	10–20 (6–10)	Indiana Farmers Coliseum (1,377); Indianapolis, IN
The Summit League tournament
03/08/2015; 9:30 pm, ESPN3	vs. Oral Roberts; Quarterfinals	L 56–58	10–21	Denny Sanford PREMIER Center (6,653); Sioux Falls, SD
*Non-conference game. ^{#}Rankings from AP Poll. (#) Tournament seedings in parentheses. All times are in Eastern Time.
