= 2014–15 Denver Pioneers men's basketball team =

American college basketball season

2014–15 Denver Pioneers men's basketball
- Conference: The Summit League
- Record: 12–18 (6–10 The Summit)
- Head coach: Joe Scott (8th season)
- Assistant coaches: Mike McKee; John Fitzgerald; A.J. Kuhle
- Home arena: Magness Arena

2014–15 Summit League men's basketball standings
	Conf.				Overall
Team	W		L	PCT	W		L	PCT
North Dakota State †	12	–	4	.750	23	–	10	.697
South Dakota State	12	–	4	.750	24	–	11	.686
Oral Roberts	10	–	6	.625	19	–	15	.559
IPFW	9	–	7	.563	16	–	15	.516
South Dakota	9	–	7	.563	17	–	16	.515
Denver	6	–	10	.375	12	–	18	.400
IUPUI	6	–	10	.375	10	–	21	.323
Omaha*	5	–	11	.313	12	–	17	.414
Western Illinois	3	–	13	.188	8	–	20	.286
† 2015 Summit League Tournament winner *ineligible for postseason play due to Div. I transition

The 2014–15 Denver Pioneers men's basketball team represented the University of Denver during the 2014–15 NCAA Division I men's basketball season. The Pioneers, led by eighth year head coach Joe Scott, played their home games at Magness Arena and were members of The Summit League. They finished the season 12–18, 6–10 in Summit League play to finish in a tie for sixth place. They lost in the quarterfinals of The Summit League tournament to North Dakota State.

== Roster ==
Number	Name	Position	Height	Weight	Year	Hometown
2	Cameron Delaney	Guard	6–4	200	Freshman	Killeen, Texas
3	Jalen Love	Guard	6–3	165	Junior	Wichita, Kansas
5	Jake Pemberton	Guard	6–3	170	Freshman	Highlands Ranch, Colorado
10	Josiah Dunn	Guard	6–2	177	Sophomore	Littleton, Colorado
14	Duke Douglas	Guard	6–4	185	Sophomore	New Orleans, Louisiana
20	Dorian Butler	Forward	6–6	225	Sophomore	Riverside, California
21	Bryant Rucker	Guard	6–0	185	Junior	Frisco, Texas
23	Brett Olson	Guard	6–5	185	Senior	Highlands Ranch, Colorado
24	Christian Mackey	Center	6–6	270	Freshman	Kirtland, New Mexico
25	Jake Logan	Center	6–8	220	RS–Junior	Norwalk, Iowa
30	Cam Griffin	Guard	6–3	190	Senior	San Antonio, Texas
33	Nate Engesser	Guard	6–3	185	Junior	Colorado Springs, Colorado
35	Marcus Boyd	Guard	6–7	215	RS–Junior	Highlands Ranch, Colorado
44	Daniel Amigo	Center	6–10	250	Freshman	El Paso, Texas

== Schedule ==
Date time, TV	Opponent	Result	Record	Site (attendance) city, state
Regular season
11/16/2014*; 4:00 pm	Idaho State	W 54–38	1–0	Magness Arena (3,002); Denver, CO
11/20/2014*; 8:00 pm, CET	at Saint Mary's	L 62–78	1–1	McKeon Pavilion (2,178); Moraga, CA
11/23/2014*; 1:00 pm	Coppin State	W 80–54	2–1	Magness Arena (N/A); Denver, CO
11/26/2014*; 12:00 pm	at Belmont	L 57–78	2–2	Curb Event Center (1,035); Nashville, TN
11/30/2014*; 1:00 pm	New Orleans	W 79–60	3–2	Magness Arena (1,468); Denver, CO
12/02/2014*; 7:00 pm, RTRM	at Wyoming	L 42–68	3–3	Arena-Auditorium (4,952); Laramie, WY
12/06/2014*; 12:00 pm	at Texas A&M–Corpus Christi	W 64–48	4–3	American Bank Center (1,064); Corpus Christi, TX
12/10/2014*; 7:00 pm	No. 23 Northern Iowa	L 55–65	4–4	Magness Arena (1,545); Denver, CO
12/13/2014*; 4:00 pm, P12N	at Stanford	L 43–49	4–5	Maples Pavilion (4,018); Stanford, CA
12/17/2014*; 6:00 pm, RTRM	Texas A&M–Corpus Christi	W 83–73	5–5	Magness Arena (740); Denver, CO
12/19/2014*; 7:00 pm, RTRM	Colorado State	L 84–85	5–6	Magness Arena (4,111); Denver, CO
12/21/2014*; 1:00 pm	Bryant	L 46–48	5–7	Magness Arena (1,318); Denver, CO
12/29/2014*; 7:00 pm, RTRM	Saint Joseph's	W 77–73 ^{OT}	6–7	Magness Arena (1,437); Denver, CO
01/02/2015; 7:00 pm, RTRM	South Dakota State	W 76–69	7–7 (1–0)	Magness Arena (1,786); Denver, CO
01/04/2015; 1:00 pm	South Dakota	L 69–74	7–8 (1–1)	Magness Arena (3,554); Denver, CO
01/08/2015; 5:00 pm	at IPFW	L 53–69	7–9 (1–2)	Gates Sports Center (683); Fort Wayne, IN
01/10/2015; 11:00 am, HTSN/ESPN3	at IUPUI	L 49–52	7–10 (1–3)	Indiana Farmers Coliseum (1,151); Indianapolis, IN
01/14/2015; 7:00 pm	Western Illinois	W 68–54	8–10 (2–3)	Magness Arena (1,003); Denver, CO
01/21/2015; 6:00 pm, RTRM	Oral Roberts	W 73–66	9–10 (3–3)	Magness Arena (1,482); Denver, CO
01/24/2015; 12:00 pm	at Omaha	L 69–80	9–11 (3–4)	Ralston Arena (1,273); Ralston, NE
01/29/2015; 6:00 pm, MeTV ND	at North Dakota State	L 54–61 ^{OT}	9–12 (3–5)	Scheels Arena (2,555); Fargo, ND
01/31/2015; 3:30 pm, Midco/ESPN3	at South Dakota State	L 39–69	9–13 (3–6)	Frost Arena (4,725); Brookings, SD
02/07/2015; 4:00 pm	Omaha	W 88–74	10–13 (4–6)	Magness Arena (2,643); Denver, CO
02/12/2015; 7:00 pm, RTRM	North Dakota State	L 69–73 ^{OT}	10–14 (4–7)	Magness Arena (1,469); Denver, CO
02/14/2015; 4:00 pm	IUPUI	L 53–54	10–15 (4–8)	Magness Arena (2,030); Denver, CO
02/19/2015; 7:00 pm	IPFW	L 47–63	10–16 (4–9)	Magness Arena (1,378); Denver, CO
02/21/2015; 6:00 pm	at Western Illinois	W 59–46	11–16 (5–9)	Western Hall (2,154); Macomb, IL
02/25/2015; 6:00 pm, Midco/ESPN3	at South Dakota	W 66–48	12–16 (6–9)	DakotaDome (1,256); Vermillion, SD
02/28/2015; 6:00 pm, ESPN3	at Oral Roberts	L 57–60	12–17 (6–10)	Mabee Center (3,720); Tulsa, OK
The Summit League tournament
03/07/2015; 7:30 pm, Midco/ESPN3	vs. North Dakota State; Quarterfinals	L 50–61	12–18	Denny Sanford PREMIER Center (9,773); Sioux Falls, SD
*Non-conference game. ^{#}Rankings from AP Poll. (#) Tournament seedings in parentheses. All times are in Mountain Time.
