= 2015 Summit League men's basketball tournament =

- Classification: Division I
- Season: 2014–15
- Teams: 8
- Site: Denny Sanford Premier Center; Sioux Falls, South Dakota
- Champions: North Dakota State (3rd title)
- Winning coach: David Richman (1st title)
- MVP: Lawrence Alexander (North Dakota State)
- Attendance: 35,612
- Television: Midco Sport Network, ESPN3; ESPN2

2014–15 The Summit League men's basketball standings
	Conf.				Overall
Team	W		L	PCT	W		L	PCT
North Dakota State †	12	–	4	.750	23	–	10	.697
South Dakota State	12	–	4	.750	24	–	11	.686
Oral Roberts	10	–	6	.625	19	–	15	.559
IPFW	9	–	7	.563	16	–	15	.516
South Dakota	9	–	7	.563	17	–	16	.515
Denver	6	–	10	.375	12	–	18	.400
IUPUI	6	–	10	.375	10	–	21	.323
Omaha*	5	–	11	.313	12	–	17	.414
Western Illinois	3	–	13	.188	8	–	20	.286
*ineligible for postseason play due to Div. I transition
† 2015 Summit League Tournament winner

The 2015 Summit League men's basketball tournament was the post-season men's basketball tournament for the Summit League. The 2015 tournament took place March 7–10 at the Denny Sanford Premier Center in Sioux Falls, South Dakota for the first time after previously being played at Sioux Falls Arena. With Oral Roberts rejoining the league, the tournament went back to eight teams. The tournament champion received an automatic bid to the 2015 NCAA tournament.

== Bracket ==
Quarterfinals; Saturday/Sunday March 7–8; Midco Sport Network, ESPN3
1	South Dakota State	87
8	Western Illinois	50
4	IPFW	73
5	South Dakota	82
2	North Dakota State	61
7	Denver	50
3	Oral Roberts	58
6	IUPUI	56

Semifinals; Monday March 9 Midco Sport Network, ESPN3
1	South Dakota State	78
5	South Dakota	65
2	North Dakota State	60
3	Oral Roberts	56

Final; Tuesday March 10; ESPN2
1	South Dakota State	56
2	North Dakota State	57

== Awards and honors ==
Tournament MVP: Lawrence Alexander – North Dakota State

All-Tournament Team:

- Lawrence Alexander – North Dakota State
- Obi Emegano – Oral Roberts
- A.J. Jacobson – North Dakota State
- Cody Larson – South Dakota State
- Deondre Parks – South Dakota State
