= 2014–15 Utah Utes men's basketball team =

American college basketball season

2014–15 Utah Utes men's basketball

NCAA tournament, Sweet Sixteen
- Conference: Pac-12 Conference

Ranking
- Coaches: No. 15
- AP: No. 19
- Record: 26–9 (13–5 Pac–12)
- Head coach: Larry Krystkowiak (4th season)
- Assistant coaches: Tommy Connor; DeMarlo Slocum; Andy Hill
- Home arena: Jon M. Huntsman Center

2014–15 Pac-12 Conference men's basketball standings
	Conf.				Overall
Team	W		L	PCT	W		L	PCT
No. 5 Arizona †	16	–	2	.889	34	–	4	.895
No. 25 Oregon	13	–	5	.722	26	–	10	.722
No. 19 Utah	13	–	5	.722	26	–	9	.743
UCLA	11	–	7	.611	22	–	14	.611
Stanford	9	–	9	.500	24	–	13	.649
Arizona State	9	–	9	.500	18	–	16	.529
Oregon State	8	–	10	.444	17	–	14	.548
California	7	–	11	.389	18	–	15	.545
Colorado	7	–	11	.389	16	–	18	.471
Washington State	7	–	11	.389	13	–	18	.419
Washington	5	–	13	.278	16	–	15	.516
USC	3	–	15	.167	12	–	20	.375
† Pac-12 Tournament winner Rankings from AP poll

The 2014–15 Utah Runnin' Utes men's basketball team represented the University of Utah during the 2014–15 NCAA Division I men's basketball season. They played their home games at the Jon M. Huntsman Center in Salt Lake City, Utah as members of the Pac-12 Conference. The Utes were led by fourth year head coach Larry Krystkowiak. They finished the season 26–9, 13–5 in Pac-12 play to finish in a tie for second place. They advanced to the semifinals of the Pac-12 tournament where they lost to Oregon. They received an at-large bid to the NCAA tournament where they defeated Stephen F. Austin in the second round and Georgetown in the third round to advance to the Sweet Sixteen where they lost to Duke.

== Previous season ==
The 2013–14 Utah Utes finished the season with an overall record of 21–12, and 9–9 in the Pac–12. In the 2014 Pac–12 Tournament, the Utes defeated Washington before losing to Arizona in the quarterfinals, 71–39. The Utes received an at–large bid to the 2014 National Invitation Tournament where they were defeated by Saint Mary's in the first round.

== Off-season ==
=== Departures ===
Name	Number	Pos.	Height	Weight	Year	Hometown	Notes
Renan Lenz	10	F	6'9"	221	Senior	Santo Ângelo, Brazil	Graduated.
Xan Ricketts	40	F	6'7"	217	RS Junior	Sandy, Utah	Left team for personal reasons.
Marko Kovacevic	1	F	6'11"	235	Junior	Belgrade, Serbia	Left team to return to Serbia to address unspecified family issues.
Princeton Onwas	3	G/F	6'5"	210	Junior	Katy, Texas	Elected to transfer.
Connor Van Brocklin	0	G	6'5"	195	Junior	Fruit Heights, Utah	Elected to transfer.
Ahmad Fields	13	G	6'5"	190	Freshman	Washington, D.C.	Elected to transfer.
Parker Van Dyke	5	G	6'3"	170	Freshman	Salt Lake City, Utah	Left team to go on 2 year LDS Mission. Eligibility will be frozen while on mission.

=== Incoming transfers ===
Name	Number	Pos.	Height	Weight	Year	Hometown	Notes
Chris Reyes		F	6'7"	205	Sophomore	La Verne, California	Junior College transfer from Citrus College.

=== 2014 recruiting class ===
College recruiting information
Name	Hometown	School	Height	Weight	Commit date
Brekkott Chapman; PF	Roy, UT	Roy HS	6 ft 8 in (2.03 m)	215 lb (98 kg)	Jul 29, 2013
Brekkott Chapman; PF	Recruit ratings: Scout: Rivals: 247Sports: ESPN:				
Kyle Kuzma; SF	Burton, MI	Rise Academy	6 ft 9 in (2.06 m)	200 lb (91 kg)	Aug 30, 2013
Kyle Kuzma; SF	Recruit ratings: Scout: Rivals: 247Sports: ESPN:				
Isaiah Wright; PG	Boise, ID	Borah HS	6 ft 2 in (1.88 m)	175 lb (79 kg)	Sep 1, 2013
Isaiah Wright; PG	Recruit ratings: Scout: Rivals: 247Sports: ESPN:				
Overall recruit ranking:
Note: In many cases, Scout, Rivals, 247Sports, On3, and ESPN may conflict in their listings of height and weight.; In these cases, the average was taken. ESPN grades are on a 100-point scale.; Sources: "2014 Utah Utes Basketball Commits". ESPN.

== Roster ==
2014–15 Utah Utes men's basketball team
Players
Coaches

Pos.	#	Name	Height	Weight	Year	Previous school	Hometown
F	0	Brekkott Chapman	6 ft 8 in (2.03 m)	200 lb (91 kg)	Fr	Roy HS	Roy, Utah
G	1	Isaiah Wright	6 ft 2 in (1.88 m)	177 lb (80 kg)	Fr	Borah HS	Boise, Idaho
G	2	Eris Winder (W)	6 ft 1 in (1.85 m)	168 lb (76 kg)	Fr	Palo Verde HS	Las Vegas, Nevada
G	10	Jake Connor (W)	6 ft 3 in (1.91 m)	177 lb (80 kg)	Fr	Highland HS	Salt Lake City, Utah
G	11	Brandon Taylor	5 ft 10 in (1.78 m)	167 lb (76 kg)	Jr	Pacific Hills School	Los Angeles, California
G/F	14	Dakarai Tucker	6 ft 5 in (1.96 m)	195 lb (88 kg)	Jr	Junípero Serra HS	Los Angeles, California
G	15	Austin Eastman (W)	6 ft 3 in (1.91 m)	180 lb (82 kg)	Sr	Billings Senior HS	Billings, Montana
F	20	Chris Reyes	6 ft 7 in (2.01 m)	230 lb (104 kg)	So	Damien HS/Citrus College	La Verne, California
F	21	Jordan Loveridge	6 ft 6 in (1.98 m)	222 lb (101 kg)	Jr	West Jordan HS	West Jordan, Utah
G	25	Kenneth Ogbe	6 ft 6 in (1.98 m)	190 lb (86 kg)	So	Urspring Academy	Ehingen, Germany
C	31	Dallin Bachynski	7 ft 0 in (2.13 m)	265 lb (120 kg)	Sr	Sir Winston Churchill HS/Southern Utah	Calgary, Alberta
F	35	Kyle Kuzma	6 ft 9 in (2.06 m)	210 lb (95 kg)	Fr	Rise Academy	Burton, Michigan
C	41	Jeremy Olsen	6 ft 10 in (2.08 m)	240 lb (109 kg)	RS Jr	Collins Hill HS	Lawrenceville, Georgia
F	42	Jakob Poeltl	7 ft 0 in (2.13 m)	235 lb (107 kg)	Fr	Arkadia Traiskirchen	Vienna, Austria
G	55	Delon Wright	6 ft 5 in (1.96 m)	190 lb (86 kg)	Sr	Leuzinger HS/CC of San Francisco	Los Angeles, California

Head coach

- Larry Krystkowiak (Montana)

Assistant coach(es)

- Tommy Connor (Utah)
- DeMarlo Slocum (Georgia Southern)
- Andy Hill (Eastern Washington)

Legend

- (C) Team captain
- (S) Suspended
- (I) Ineligible
- (W) Walk-on
- Injured
- Current redshirt

Roster
Last update: 10/06/2014

== Schedule ==
Date time, TV	Rank^{#}	Opponent^{#}	Result	Record	Site (attendance) city, state
Exhibition
11/06/2014*; 8:30 pm, P12N		Pacific	W 98–38		Huntsman Center; Salt Lake City, UT
Non-conference regular season
11/14/2014*; 8:00 pm, P12N		Ball State	W 90–72	1–0	Huntsman Center (9,855); Salt Lake City, UT
11/18/2014*; 2:00 pm, ESPN	No. 25	at No. 16 San Diego State; ESPN College Hoops Tip-Off Marathon	L 49–53	1–1	Viejas Arena (12,414); San Diego, CA
11/21/2014*; 7:00 pm, P12N	No. 25	UC Riverside	W 88–42	2–1	Huntsman Center (N/A); Salt Lake City, UT
11/26/2014*; 6:00 pm, P12N		UT Pan American; Global Sports Showcase	W 85–48	3–1	Huntsman Center (9,487); Salt Lake City, UT
11/28/2014*; 8:00 pm, P12N		North Dakota; Global Sports Showcase	W 90–53	4–1	Huntsman Center (9,794); Salt Lake City, UT
11/29/2014*; 7:00 pm, P12N		Alabama State; Global Sports Showcase	W 93–62	5–1	Huntsman Center (9,921); Salt Lake City, UT
12/03/2014*; 9:00 pm, ESPN2	No. 25	No. 8 Wichita State	W 69–68 ^{OT}	6–1	Huntsman Center (14,319); Salt Lake City, UT
12/10/2014*; 7:00 pm, ESPNU	No. 13	at BYU; Old Oquirrh Bucket/Deseret First Duel	W 65–61	7–1	Marriott Center (20,900); Provo, UT
12/13/2014*; 1:15 pm, ESPN	No. 13	vs. No. 10 Kansas; Sprint Center Showcase	L 60–63	7–2	Sprint Center (17,627); Kansas City, MO
12/20/2014*; 9:30 pm, ESPN2	No. 14	vs. UNLV; MGM Grand Garden Showcase	W 59–46	8–2	MGM Grand Garden Arena (N/A); Paradise, NV
12/23/2014*; 7:00 pm, P12N	No. 14	South Dakota State	W 80–66	9–2	Huntsman Center (10,322); Salt Lake City, UT
12/30/2014*; 7:30 pm, P12N	No. 10	Carroll (MT)	W 85–49	10–2	Huntsman Center (9,527); Salt Lake City, UT
Pac-12 regular season
01/02/2015; 8:00 pm, ESPNU	No. 10	USC	W 79–55	11–2 (1–0)	Huntsman Center (14,140); Salt Lake City, UT
01/04/2015; 2:00 pm, P12N	No. 10	UCLA	W 71–39	12–2 (2–0)	Huntsman Center (10,566); Salt Lake City, UT
01/07/2015; 7:00 pm, ESPN2	No. 9	Colorado	W 74–49	13–2 (3–0)	Huntsman Center (13,876); Salt Lake City, UT
01/15/2015; 8:00 pm, ESPN2	No. 8	at Arizona State	W 76–59	14–2 (4–0)	Wells Fargo Arena (9,831); Tempe, AZ
01/17/2015; 5:00 pm, P12N	No. 8	at No. 10 Arizona	L 51–69	14–3 (4–1)	McKale Center (14,655); Tucson, AZ
01/21/2015; 7:00 pm, P12N	No. 12	Washington State	W 86–64	15–3 (5–1)	Huntsman Center (12,691); Salt Lake City, UT
01/25/2015; 6:30 pm, ESPNU	No. 12	Washington	W 77–56	16–3 (6–1)	Huntsman Center (13,047); Salt Lake City, UT
01/29/2015; 8:00 pm, ESPN2	No. 11	at UCLA	L 59–69	16–4 (6–2)	Pauley Pavilion (7,008); Los Angeles, CA
02/01/2015; 12:30 pm, ESPNU	No. 11	at USC	W 67–39	17–4 (7–2)	Galen Center (2,835); Los Angeles, CA
02/07/2015; 8:00 pm, P12N	No. 13	at Colorado	W 79–51	18–4 (8–2)	Coors Events Center (9,907); Boulder, CO
02/12/2015; 7:00 pm, P12N	No. 11	Stanford	W 75–59	19–4 (9–2)	Huntsman Center (15,018); Salt Lake City, UT
02/15/2015; 6:30 pm, ESPNU	No. 11	California	W 76–61	20–4 (10–2)	Huntsman Center (14,159); Salt Lake City, UT
02/19/2015; 10:00 pm, P12N	No. 9	at Oregon State	W 47–37	21–4 (11–2)	Gill Coliseum (6,124); Corvallis, OR
02/22/2015; 1:00 pm, FS1	No. 9	at Oregon	L 58–69	21–5 (11–3)	Matthew Knight Arena (10,725); Eugene, OR
02/26/2015; 8:30 pm, FS1	No. 13	Arizona State	W 83–41	22–5 (12–3)	Huntsman Center (14,185); Salt Lake City, UT
02/28/2015; 7:00 pm, ESPN	No. 13	No. 7 Arizona	L 57–63	22–6 (12–4)	Huntsman Center (15,165); Salt Lake City, UT
03/05/2015; 9:00 pm, ESPNU	No. 13	at Washington State	W 67–59	23–6 (13–4)	Beasley Coliseum (2,690); Pullman, WA
03/07/2015; 2:30 pm, P12N	No. 13	at Washington	L 68–77	23–7 (13–5)	Alaska Airlines Arena (7,386); Seattle, WA
Pac-12 tournament
03/12/2015; 9:30 pm, ESPN	(3) No. 17	vs. (6) Stanford; Quarterfinals	W 80–56	24–7	MGM Grand Garden Arena (12,916); Paradise, NV
03/13/2015; 9:30 pm, ESPN	(3) No. 17	vs. (2) Oregon; Semifinals	L 64–67	24–8	MGM Grand Garden Arena (12,916); Paradise, NV
NCAA tournament
03/19/2015*; 4:27 pm, truTV	(5 S) No. 19	vs. (12 S) Stephen F. Austin; Second round	W 57–50	25–8	Moda Center (14,279); Portland, OR
03/19/2015*; 5:45 pm, CBS	(5 S) No. 19	vs. (4 S) No. 22 Georgetown; Third round	W 75–64	26–8	Moda Center (17,370); Portland, OR
03/27/2015*; 7:45 pm, CBS	(5 S) No. 19	vs. (1 S) No. 4 Duke; Sweet Sixteen	L 57–63	26–9	NRG Stadium (21,168); Houston, TX
*Non-conference game. ^{#}Rankings from AP Poll. (#) Tournament seedings in parentheses. All times are in Mountain Time. (#) during NCAA Tournament is seed with Region S=South.

== Ranking movement ==
Legend: ██ Increase in ranking. ██ Decrease in ranking.
Poll	Pre	Wk 2	Wk 3	Wk 4	Wk 5	Wk 6	Wk 7	Wk 8	Wk 9	Wk 10	Wk 11	Wk 12	Wk 13	Wk 14	Wk 15	Wk 16	Wk 17	Wk 18	Post	Final
AP	25 т	25	RV	25	13	14	14	10	9	8	12	11	13	11	9	13	13	17	19	N/A
Coaches	RV	RV	RV	RV	14	14	14	12	11	8	11	10	11	10	9	12	13	17	18	15

== See also ==
2014–15 Utah Utes women's basketball team
