= 2014–15 Purdue Boilermakers men's basketball team =

American college basketball season

2014–15 Purdue Boilermakers men's basketball

NCAA tournament, Round of 64
- Conference: Big Ten Conference
- Record: 21–13 (12–6 Big Ten)
- Head coach: Matt Painter (10th Season)
- Assistant coaches: Jack Owens; Brandon Brantley; Greg Gary
- Home arena: Mackey Arena

2014–15 Big Ten Conference men's basketball standings
| | Conf. | | | | Overall |
| Team | W | | L | PCT | W | | L | PCT |
|---|---|---|---|---|---|---|---|---|
| No. 3 Wisconsin † | 16 | – | 2 | .889 | 36 | – | 4 | .900 |
| No. 12 Maryland | 14 | – | 4 | .778 | 28 | – | 7 | .800 |
| No. 23 Michigan State | 12 | – | 6 | .667 | 27 | – | 12 | .692 |
| Iowa | 12 | – | 6 | .667 | 22 | – | 12 | .647 |
| Purdue | 12 | – | 6 | .667 | 21 | – | 13 | .618 |
| Ohio State | 11 | – | 7 | .611 | 24 | – | 11 | .686 |
| Indiana | 9 | – | 9 | .500 | 20 | – | 14 | .588 |
| Illinois | 9 | – | 9 | .500 | 19 | – | 14 | .576 |
| Michigan | 8 | – | 10 | .444 | 16 | – | 16 | .500 |
| Minnesota | 6 | – | 12 | .333 | 18 | – | 15 | .545 |
| Northwestern | 6 | – | 12 | .333 | 15 | – | 17 | .469 |
| Nebraska | 5 | – | 13 | .278 | 13 | – | 18 | .419 |
| Penn State | 4 | – | 14 | .222 | 18 | – | 16 | .529 |
| Rutgers | 2 | – | 16 | .111 | 10 | – | 22 | .313 |
† 2015 Big Ten tournament winner Rankings from AP poll

The 2014–15 Purdue Boilermakers men's basketball team represented Purdue University. Their head coach was Matt Painter, in his tenth season with the Boilers. The team played its home games in Mackey Arena in West Lafayette, Indiana, and were members of the Big Ten Conference. They finished the season 21–13, 12–6 in Big Ten play to finish in a three-way tie for third place. They advanced to the semifinals of the Big Ten tournament where they lost to Wisconsin. They received an at-large bid to the NCAA tournament where they lost in the second round to Cincinnati.

== Previous season ==
The Boilermakers finished the season 15–17, 5–13 in Big Ten play to finish in last place. They lost in the first round of the Big Ten tournament to Ohio State.

== Departures ==
| Name | Number | Pos. | Height | Weight | Year | Hometown | Notes |
|---|---|---|---|---|---|---|---|
| Terone Johnson | 0 | G | 6'2" | 199 | Senior | Indianapolis, IN | Graduated |
| Sterling Carter | 1 | G | 6'0" | 200 | RS Senior | Seattle, WA | Graduated |
| Ronnie Johnson | 3 | G | 6'0" | 175 | Sophomore | Indianapolis, IN | Transferred to Houston |
| Jay Simpson | 23 | F | 6'9" | 250 | RS Freshman | Champaign, IL | Retired from basketball due a heart condition |
| Errick Peck | 32 | F | 6'6" | 223 | RS Senior | Indianapolis, IN | Graduated |
| Travis Carroll | 50 | F | 6'9" | 245 | Senior | Danville, IN | Graduated |

== Roster ==
2014–15 Purdue Boilermakers men's basketball team
Players
Coaches

| Pos. | # | Name | Height | Weight | Year | Hometown |
|---|---|---|---|---|---|---|
| G | 0 | Jon Octeus | 6 ft 4 in (1.93 m) | 175 lb (79 kg) | Sr | Miramar, FL |
| G | 1 | Bryson Scott | 6 ft 1 in (1.85 m) | 201 lb (91 kg) | So | Fort Wayne, IN |
| G | 2 | Jon McKeeman | 6 ft 1 in (1.85 m) | 180 lb (82 kg) | Jr | Fort Wayne, IN |
| G | 3 | P.J. Thompson | 5 ft 11 in (1.8 m) | 170 lb (77 kg) | Fr | Indianapolis, IN |
| F | 5 | Basil Smotherman | 6 ft 5 in (1.96 m) | 222 lb (101 kg) | So | Indianapolis, IN |
| G | 11 | Stephen Toyra | 6 ft 3 in (1.91 m) | 177 lb (80 kg) | Jr | Lafayette, IN |
| F | 12 | Vincent Edwards | 6 ft 7 in (2.01 m) | 210 lb (95 kg) | Fr | Middletown, OH |
| C | 20 | A. J. Hammons | 7 ft 0 in (2.13 m) | 251 lb (114 kg) | Jr | Carmel, IN |
| G | 21 | Kendall Stephens | 6 ft 6 in (1.98 m) | 193 lb (88 kg) | So | St. Charles, IL |
| F | 23 | Jacquil Taylor | 6 ft 9 in (2.06 m) | 215 lb (98 kg) | Fr | Cambridge, MA |
| G | 24 | Anfernee Brown | 6 ft 1 in (1.85 m) | 190 lb (86 kg) | So | East Chicago, IN |
| F | 30 | Neal Beshears | 6 ft 7 in (2.01 m) | 198 lb (90 kg) | Sr | Winchester, IN |
| G | 31 | Dakota Mathias | 6 ft 5 in (1.96 m) | 190 lb (86 kg) | Fr | Elida, OH |
| G | 35 | Raphael Davis | 6 ft 5 in (1.96 m) | 211 lb (96 kg) | Jr | Fort Wayne, IN |
| C | 44 | Isaac Haas | 7 ft 2 in (2.18 m) | 285 lb (129 kg) | Fr | Piedmont, AL |

Head coach

Matt Painter (Purdue)

Assistant coach(es)

Jack Owens (Eastern Illinois)
Greg Gary (Tulane)
Brandon Brantley (Purdue)

Legend

- (C) Team captain
- (S) Suspended
- (I) Ineligible
- (W) Walk-on
- Injured
- Current redshirt

Roster
Last update: 2014-06-09

== Incoming recruits ==
Isaac Haas, an Alabama native, committed to Purdue on November 18, 2013. Haas' primary reason for committing to Purdue was due to the university's ability to develop its tall players, saying "It's great exposure, and under Matt Painter, almost every 7-footer who went to Purdue went to the NBA." Haas, who originally committed to Wake Forest, was a four star and top 100 recruit.

Vincent Edwards committed to Purdue on September 14, 2013. Edwards was ranked the #80 recruit of 2014. Edwards had been considering which school to commit to since his sophomore year, and said, "“Never in my mind have I had a doubt about Purdue. But of course, I wanted to be sure that I was making the right decision. I felt like it was the right decision to make, so I made it today."

Jacquil Taylor, from Cambridge, Massachusetts committed to Purdue on September 30, 2013. Although Taylor was injured his senior year, there was enough film of him prior to the injury for Purdue to sign him.

Dakota Mathias, a shooting guard from Elida, Ohio, committed to Purdue on May 5, 2013.

P.J. Thompson, from Indianapolis, IN, was the last of the class to commit, committing on March 11, 2014. Thompson, who suffered a foot injury his senior season, was not heavily recruited, and accepted Purdue's late offer. His father, LaSalle, was once a summer teammate of Coach Painter.

=== Class of 2014 recruits ===
College recruiting
| Name | Hometown | School | Height | Weight | Commit date |
|---|---|---|---|---|---|
| Isaac Haas; C | Piedmont, AL | Hokes Bluff High School | 7 ft 0 in (2.13 m) | 275 lb (125 kg) | Nov 18, 2013 |
| Isaac Haas; C | Recruit ratings: Scout: Rivals: 247Sports: ESPN: | | | | |
| Vincent Edwards; SF | Middletown, OH | Middletown High School | 6 ft 7 in (2.01 m) | 200 lb (91 kg) | Sep 14, 2011 |
| Vincent Edwards; SF | Recruit ratings: Scout: Rivals: 247Sports: ESPN: | | | | |
| Jacquil Taylor; PF | Cambridge, MA | Beaver Country Day School | 6 ft 8 in (2.03 m) | 205 lb (93 kg) | Sep 30, 2013 |
| Jacquil Taylor; PF | Recruit ratings: Scout: Rivals: 247Sports: ESPN: | | | | |
| Dakota Mathias; SG | Elida, OH | Elida High School | 6 ft 8 in (2.03 m) | 205 lb (93 kg) | May 5, 2013 |
| Dakota Mathias; SG | Recruit ratings: Scout: Rivals: 247Sports: ESPN: | | | | |
| P.J. Thompson; PG | Indianapolis, IN | Brebeuf Jesuit Preparatory School | 5 ft 11 in (1.80 m) | 165 lb (75 kg) | Mar 11, 2014 |
| P.J. Thompson; PG | Recruit ratings: Scout: Rivals: 247Sports: ESPN: | | | | |
Overall recruit ranking: Rivals: 27
Note: In many cases, Scout, Rivals, 247Sports, On3, and ESPN may conflict in their listings of height and weight.; In these cases, the average was taken. ESPN grades are on a 100-point scale.; Sources: "2014 Purdue Signees". Rivals.; "2014 Purdue Signees". Scout.; "2014 Purdue Signees". ESPN.; "Scout.com Team Recruiting Rankings". Scout.; "2014 Team Ranking". Rivals.

=== Class of 2015 recruits ===
College recruiting
| Name | Hometown | School | Height | Weight | Commit date |
|---|---|---|---|---|---|
| Ryan Cline; SG | Carmel, IN | Carmel High School | 6 ft 5 in (1.96 m) | 175 lb (79 kg) | Jun 2, 2014 |
| Ryan Cline; SG | Recruit ratings: Scout: Rivals: (NR) | | | | |
Overall recruit ranking: Rivals: 27
Note: In many cases, Scout, Rivals, 247Sports, On3, and ESPN may conflict in their listings of height and weight.; In these cases, the average was taken. ESPN grades are on a 100-point scale.; Sources: "2015 Purdue Signees". Rivals.; "2015 Purdue Signees". Scout.; "2015 Purdue Signees". ESPN.; "Scout.com Team Recruiting Rankings". Scout.; "2015 Team Ranking". Rivals.

== Schedule ==
| Date time, TV | Rank^{#} | Opponent^{#} | Result | Record | Site (attendance) city, state |
Exhibition
| Nov 2*; 2:00 pm | | California (PA) | W 89–52 | – | Mackey Arena (10,179); West Lafayette, IN |
| Nov 7*; 7:00 pm | | Carroll College | W 90–49 | – | Mackey Arena (10,500); West Lafayette, IN |
Non-conference regular season
| Nov 14*; 7:00 pm | | Samford; Maui Invitational Tournament Opening Round | W 80–40 | 1–0 | Mackey Arena (10,430); West Lafayette, IN |
| Nov 16*; 3:00 pm, BTN | | IUPUI | W 77–57 | 2–0 | Mackey Arena (11,466); West Lafayette, IN |
| Nov 20*; 7:00 pm | | Grambling State | W 82–30 | 3–0 | Mackey Arena (10,021); West Lafayette, IN |
| Nov 24*; 2:30 pm, ESPN2 | | vs. Kansas State; Maui Invitational Tournament quarterfinals | L 79–88 | 3–1 | Lahaina Civic Center (2,400); Maui, HI |
| Nov 25*; 2:00 pm, ESPN2 | | vs. Missouri; Maui Invitational Tournament Consolation 2nd Round | W 82–61 | 4–1 | Lahaina Civic Center (2,400); Maui, HI |
| Nov 26*; 5:00 pm, ESPN2 | | vs. BYU; Maui Invitational Tournament 5th Place Game | W 87–85 ^{OT} | 5–1 | Lahaina Civic Center (2,400); Maui, HI |
| Dec 2*; 9:00 pm, ESPNU | | NC State; ACC–Big Ten Challenge | W 66–61 | 6–1 | Mackey Arena (12,023); West Lafayette, IN |
| Dec 6*; 2:00 pm | | North Florida | L 70–73 | 6–2 | Mackey Arena (11,038); West Lafayette, IN |
| Dec 8*; 7:00 pm, ESPNU | | IPFW | W 63–43 | 7–2 | Mackey Arena (10,007); West Lafayette, IN |
| Dec 10*; 7:00 pm, ESPNU | | Arkansas State | W 87–46 | 8–2 | Mackey Arena (9,964); West Lafayette, IN |
| Dec 13*; 9:00 pm, SECN | | at Vanderbilt | L 71–81 | 8–3 | Memorial Gymnasium (9,565); Nashville, TN |
| Dec 20*; 5:15 pm, BTN | | vs. No. 21 Notre Dame; Crossroads Classic | L 63–94 | 8–4 | Bankers Life Fieldhouse (14,753); Indianapolis, IN |
| Dec 22*; 6:00 pm | | Gardner–Webb | L 84–89 | 8–5 | Mackey Arena (8,835); West Lafayette, IN |
Big Ten regular season
| Dec 31; 3:15 pm, BTN | | Minnesota | W 72–68 | 9–5 (1–0) | Mackey Arena (10,018); West Lafayette, IN |
| Jan 3; 2:15 pm, BTN | | Michigan | W 64–51 | 10–5 (2–0) | Mackey Arena (11,271); West Lafayette, IN |
| Jan 7; 7:00 pm, BTN | | at No. 4 Wisconsin | L 55–62 | 10–6 (2–1) | Kohl Center (17,279); Madison, WI |
| Jan 10; 2:30 pm, BTN | | No. 11 Maryland | L 60–69 | 10–7 (2–2) | Mackey Arena (10,756); West Lafayette, IN |
| Jan 17; 1:00 pm, ESPNU | | at Penn State | W 84–77 ^{OT} | 11–7 (3–2) | Bryce Jordan Center (8,949); University Park, PA |
| Jan 21; 9:00 pm, BTN | | at Illinois | L 57–66 | 11–8 (3–3) | State Farm Center (12,965); Champaign, IL |
| Jan 24; 12:00 pm, BTN | | No. 25 Iowa | W 67–63 | 12–8 (4–3) | Mackey Arena (12,068); West Lafayette, IN |
| Jan 28; 9:00 pm, BTN | | No. 22 Indiana; Rivalry/Crimson and Gold Cup | W 83–67 | 13–8 (5–3) | Mackey Arena (14,846); West Lafayette, IN |
| Jan 31; 6:00 pm, ESPNU | | at Northwestern | W 68–60 | 14–8 (6–3) | Welsh-Ryan Arena (8,117); Evanston, IL |
| Feb 4; 6:30 pm, BTN | | No. 20 Ohio State | W 60–58 | 15–8 (7–3) | Mackey Arena (12,087); West Lafayette, IN |
| Feb 7; 3:00 pm, BTN | | at Minnesota | L 58–62 | 15–9 (7–4) | Williams Arena (13,041); Minneapolis, MN |
| Feb 12; 7:00 pm, ESPNU | | at Rutgers | W 61–51 | 16–9 (8–4) | The RAC (5,805); Piscataway, NJ |
| Feb 15; 5:15 pm, BTN | | Nebraska | W 66–54 | 17–9 (9–4) | Mackey Arena (14,313); West Layfette, IN |
| Feb 19; 7:00 pm, ESPN | | at Indiana; Rivalry/Crimson and Gold Cup | W 67–63 | 18–9 (10–4) | Assembly Hall (17,472); Bloomington, IN |
| Feb 26; 9:00 pm, ESPNU | | Rutgers | W 92–85 | 19–9 (11–4) | Mackey Arena (11,895); West Lafayette, IN |
| Mar 1; 7:30 pm, BTN | | at Ohio State | L 61–65 | 19–10 (11–5) | Value City Arena (15,978); Columbus, OH |
| Mar 4; 8:00 pm, BTN | | at Michigan State | L 66–72 | 19–11 (11–6) | Breslin Center (14,797); East Lansing, MI |
| Mar 7; 4:30 pm, BTN | | Illinois | W 63–58 | 20–11 (12–6) | Mackey Arena (14,846); West Lafayette, IN |
Big Ten tournament
| Mar 13; 2:30 pm, ESPN | | vs. Penn State; Quarterfinals | W 64–59 | 21–11 | United Center (17,290); Chicago, IL |
| Mar 14; 1:00 pm, CBS | | vs. No. 6 Wisconsin; Semifinals | L 51–71 | 21–12 | United Center (18,088); Chicago, IL |
NCAA tournament
| Mar 19*; 7:10 pm, CBS | (9 MW) | vs. (8 MW) Cincinnati; Second Round | L 65–66 ^{OT} | 21–13 | KFC Yum! Center (21,639); Louisville, KY |
*Non-conference game. ^{#}Rankings from AP Poll. (#) Tournament seedings in parentheses. MW=Midwest Region. All times are in Eastern Time.

== See also ==
- 2014–15 Purdue Boilermakers women's basketball team
