= 2014–15 Omaha Mavericks men's basketball team =

American college basketball season

2014–15 Omaha Mavericks men's basketball
- Conference: The Summit League
- Record: 12–17 (5–11 The Summit)
- Head coach: Derrin Hansen (10th season)
- Assistant coaches: Pat Eberhart; Tyler Erwin; Randall Herbst
- Home arena: Ralston Arena

2014–15 Summit League men's basketball standings
	Conf.				Overall
Team	W		L	PCT	W		L	PCT
North Dakota State †	12	–	4	.750	23	–	10	.697
South Dakota State	12	–	4	.750	24	–	11	.686
Oral Roberts	10	–	6	.625	19	–	15	.559
IPFW	9	–	7	.563	16	–	15	.516
South Dakota	9	–	7	.563	17	–	16	.515
Denver	6	–	10	.375	12	–	18	.400
IUPUI	6	–	10	.375	10	–	21	.323
Omaha*	5	–	11	.313	12	–	17	.414
Western Illinois	3	–	13	.188	8	–	20	.286
† 2015 Summit League Tournament winner *ineligible for postseason play due to Div. I transition

The 2014–15 Omaha Mavericks men's basketball team represented the University of Nebraska Omaha during the 2014–15 NCAA Division I men's basketball season. The Mavericks, led by tenth year head coach Derrin Hansen, played their home games at the Ralston Arena and were members of The Summit League. As part of their transition from Division II to Division I, they were ineligible for the NCAA Tournament, and thus The Summit League Tournament because its champion receives an NCAA Tournament bid. They finished the season 12–17, 5–11 in Summit League play to finish in 8th place.

This was the Mavericks' final season at Ralston Arena. The team moved to the new on-campus Baxter Arena in fall 2015.

== Roster ==
Number	Name	Position	Height	Weight	Year	Hometown
1	Tim Smallwood	Guard	6–2	175	Junior	Tulsa, Oklahoma
2	Randy Reed	Guard	6–6	200	Junior	St. Louis, Missouri
3	Devin Patterson	Guard	5–11	160	Junior	Portsmouth, Virginia
4	Kyler Erickson	Guard	6–0	165	Junior	Omaha, Nebraska
5	Mike Rostampour	Forward	6–8	230	Senior	Omaha, Nebraska
10	CJ Carter	Guard	6–0	180	Senior	Omaha, Nebraska
11	Rylan Murry	Forward	6–7	240	Freshman	West Branch, Iowa
15	Tre'Shawn Thurman	Forward	6–7	220	Freshman	Omaha, Nebraska
23	Marcus Tyus	Guard	6–1	175	Junior	Ramsey, Minnesota
24	Alex Allbery	Guard	6–1	180	Sophomore	Omaha, Nebraska
25	Devin Newsome	Guard	5–9	165	Freshman	Shawnee, Kansas
32	Daniel Meyer	Forward	6–9	240	Freshman	Billings, Montana
43	Jake White	Forward	6–8	235	Junior	Chaska, Minnesota

== Schedule ==
Date time, TV	Opponent	Result	Record	Site (attendance) city, state
Regular season
11/16/2014*; 4:00 pm	Central Arkansas	W 100–75	1–0	Ralston Arena (1,367); Ralston, NE
11/19/2014*; 9:00 pm	at Seattle	L 74–98	1–1	KeyArena (1,535); Seattle, WA
11/22/2014*; 1:30 pm, FS2	at Marquette	W 97–89	2–1	BMO Harris Bradley Center (12,575); Milwaukee, WI
11/25/2014*; 7:00 pm, ESPN3	at Nebraska	W 80–67	2–2	Pinnacle Bank Arena (15,889); Lincoln, NE
11/29/2014*; 1:00 pm	Nevada	W 78–54	3–2	Ralston Arena (1,723); Ralston, NE
12/02/2014*; 7:00 pm, FS Midwest	at Kansas State	L 66–84	3–3	Bramlage Coliseum (12,126); Manhattan, KS
12/08/2014*; 8:00 pm, MWN	at Air Force	L 61–77	3–4	Clune Arena (1,003); Colorado Springs, CO
12/10/2014*; 7:00 pm	Iowa Wesleyan	W 94–67	4–4	Ralston Arena (1,012); Ralston, NE
12/13/2014*; 2:00 pm, ASN	at UMKC	L 72–79	4–5	Municipal Auditorium (2,719); Kansas City, MO
12/17/2014*; 8:00 pm	Northern Colorado	W 92–82	5–5	Ralston Arena (1,287); Ralston, NE
12/21/2014*; 1:00 pm	Texas–Pan American	W 77–72	6–5	Ralston Arena (1,039); Ralston, NE
12/29/2014*; 7:00 pm	at Chicago State	L 66–69	6–6	Emil and Patricia Jones Convocation Center (342); Chicago, IL
01/02/2015; 7:00 pm	at South Dakota	W 86–77	7–6 (1–0)	DakotaDome (1,425); Vermillion, SD
01/04/2015; 1:00 pm	at Western Illinois	L 78–80	7–7 (1–1)	Western Hall (654); Macomb, IL
01/08/2015; 7:00 pm, Midco/ESPN3	North Dakota State	L 72–75	7–8 (1–2)	Ralston Arena (1,243); Ralston, NE
01/10/2015; 4:30 pm, Midco/ESPN3	South Dakota State	L 68–87	7–9 (1–3)	Ralston Arena (1,877); Ralston, NE
01/14/2015; 7:00 pm, ESPN3	at Oral Roberts	L 86–102	7–10 (1–4)	Mabee Center (2,884); Tulsa, OK
01/18/2015; 1:00 pm	IUPUI	L 84–89	7–11 (1–5)	Ralston Arena (1,157); Ralston, NE
01/24/2015; 1:00 pm	Denver	W 80–69	8–11 (2–5)	Ralston Arena (1,273); Ralston, NE
01/28/2015; 7:00 pm	at South Dakota State	L 64–86	8–12 (2–6)	Frost Arena (2,274); Brookings, SD
01/31/2015; 1:00 pm	IPFW	L 65–75	8–13 (2–7)	Ralston Arena (1,109); Ralston, NE
02/05/2015; 7:00 pm, MeTV ND	at North Dakota State	L 57–64	8–14 (2–8)	Scheels Arena (2,544); Fargo, ND
02/07/2015; 5:00 pm	at Denver	L 74–88	8–15 (2–9)	Magness Arena (2,643); Denver, CO
02/12/2015; 7:00 pm	South Dakota	L 73–74	8–16 (2–10)	Ralston Arena (1,457); Ralston, NE
02/14/2015; 1:00 pm	Western Illinois	W 77–58	9–16 (3–10)	Ralston Arena (1,108); Ralston, NE
02/19/2015; 7:00 pm	Oral Roberts	L 78–81	9–17 (3–11)	Ralston Arena (2,209); Ralston, NE
02/26/2015; 6:00 pm	at IPFW	W 73–67	10–17 (4–11)	Gates Sports Center (1,015); Fort Wayne, IN
02/28/2015; 12:00 pm, ESPN3	at IUPUI	W 87–80 ^{2OT}	11–17 (5–11)	Indiana Farmers Coliseum (1,377); Indianapolis, IN
03/03/2015*; 8:00 pm, FCS Pacific	at North Dakota	W 80–78	12–17	Betty Engelstad Sioux Center (1,479); Grand Forks, ND
*Non-conference game. ^{#}Rankings from AP Poll. (#) Tournament seedings in parentheses. All times are in Central Time.
