= 2014–15 South Dakota State Jackrabbits men's basketball team =

American college basketball season

2014–15 South Dakota State Jackrabbits men's basketball

Summit League regular season co–champions

NIT, Second round
- Conference: Summit League
- Record: 24–11 (12–4 The Summit)
- Head coach: Scott Nagy (20th season)
- Assistant coaches: Rob Klinkefus; Brian Cooley; Joe Krabbenhoft
- Home arena: Frost Arena

2014–15 Summit League men's basketball standings
	Conf.				Overall
Team	W		L	PCT	W		L	PCT
North Dakota State †	12	–	4	.750	23	–	10	.697
South Dakota State	12	–	4	.750	24	–	11	.686
Oral Roberts	10	–	6	.625	19	–	15	.559
IPFW	9	–	7	.563	16	–	15	.516
South Dakota	9	–	7	.563	17	–	16	.515
Denver	6	–	10	.375	12	–	18	.400
IUPUI	6	–	10	.375	10	–	21	.323
Omaha*	5	–	11	.313	12	–	17	.414
Western Illinois	3	–	13	.188	8	–	20	.286
† 2015 Summit League Tournament winner *ineligible for postseason play due to Div. I transition

The 2014–15 South Dakota State Jackrabbits men's basketball team represented South Dakota State University during the 2014–15 NCAA Division I men's basketball season. The Jackrabbits, led by 20th year head coach Scott Nagy, played their home games at Frost Arena and were members of the Summit League. They finished the season 24–11, 12–4 in The Summit League play to finish in a share for The Summit League regular season championship. They advanced to the championship game of The Summit League tournament where they lost to North Dakota State. As a regular season champion, and #1 seed in their league tournament, who failed to win their league tournament, they received an automatic bid to the National Invitation Tournament where they defeated Colorado State in the first round before losing in the second round to Vanderbilt.

== Roster ==
2014–15 South Dakota State Jackrabbits men's basketball team
Players
Coaches

Pos.	#	Name	Height	Weight	Year	Hometown
G	0	Deondre Parks	6 ft 4 in (1.93 m)	190 lb (86 kg)	Jr	Flint, Michigan
G	1	Skyler Flatten	6 ft 6 in (1.98 m)	185 lb (84 kg)	RS Fr	Clark, South Dakota
G	2	Keaton Moffitt	6 ft 5 in (1.96 m)	190 lb (86 kg)	Jr	Sioux Falls, South Dakota
G	4	Jake Bittle	6 ft 4 in (1.93 m)	200 lb (91 kg)	Jr	Bixby, Oklahoma
G	5	Anders Broman	6 ft 2 in (1.88 m)	190 lb (86 kg)	So	Duluth, Minnesota
G	10	Joshua White	6 ft 2 in (1.88 m)	180 lb (82 kg)	RS So	Edwardsville, Illinois
G	11	George Marshall	6 ft 1 in (1.85 m)	190 lb (86 kg)	Jr	Chicago, Illinois
G	13	Cory Jacobsen	6 ft 1 in (1.85 m)	190 lb (86 kg)	RS Jr	Viborg, South Dakota
G/F	23	Reed Tellinghuisen	6 ft 6 in (1.98 m)	175 lb (79 kg)	RS Fr	Sac City, Iowa
G/F	24	Zach Horstman	6 ft 6 in (1.98 m)	205 lb (93 kg)	Sr	Winner, South Dakota
G	25	Lane Severyn	6 ft 5 in (1.96 m)	205 lb (93 kg)	RS Fr	Pierre, South Dakota
F	30	Connor Devine	6 ft 10 in (2.08 m)	220 lb (100 kg)	So	Wasilla, Alaska
F	32	Mike Daum	6 ft 9 in (2.06 m)	245 lb (111 kg)	Fr	Kimball, Nebraska
F	33	Logan Doyle	6 ft 8 in (2.03 m)	220 lb (100 kg)	RS Fr	Alexandria, Minnesota
F	34	Cody Larson	6 ft 9 in (2.06 m)	235 lb (107 kg)	Sr	Sioux Falls, South Dakota
F	42	Ian Theisen	6 ft 9 in (2.06 m)	250 lb (113 kg)	Fr	Osseo, Minnesota

Head coach

- Scott Nagy (Delta State)

Assistant coach(es)

- Rob Klinkefus (Buena Vista)
- Brian Cooley (Nebraska Wesleyan)
- Joe Krabbenhoft (Wisconsin)

Legend

- (C) Team captain
- (S) Suspended
- (I) Ineligible
- (W) Walk-on
- Injured
- Current redshirt

Roster
Last update: 2014-09-01

== Schedule ==
Date time, TV	Rank^{#}	Opponent^{#}	Result	Record	Site (attendance) city, state
Exhibition
10/30/2014*; 8:30 pm		South Dakota Mines	W 76–54		Frost Arena (2,220); Brookings, SD
11/04/2014*; 7:00 pm		Dakota Wesleyan	W 79–72		Frost Arena (1,458); Brookings, SD
Regular season
11/14/2014*; 6:30 pm, ESPN3		at Buffalo	L 67–69	0–1	Alumni Arena (3,315); Amherst, NY
11/17/2014*; 9:00 pm		at Idaho	L 77–82	0–2	Memorial Gymnasium (631); Moscow, ID
11/21/2014*; 7:00 pm, Midco		North Dakota	W 74–72	1–2	Frost Arena (2,651); Brookings, SD
11/24/2014*; 8:30 pm		Chadron State	W 87–42	2–2	Frost Arena (1,925); Brookings, SD
11/30/2014*; 4:00 pm		vs. Florida Gulf Coast	L 58–71	2–3	Sanford Pentagon (3,250); Sioux Falls, SD
12/03/2014*; 7:00 pm		Wayne State College	W 89–55	3–3	Frost Arena (1,818); Brookings, SD
12/06/2014*; 1:00 pm, ESPN3		UMKC	W 81–61	4–3	Frost Arena (1,301); Brookings, SD
12/09/2014*; 7:00 pm, FS North+		at Saint Louis	W 62–55	5–3	Chaifetz Arena (5,102); St. Louis, MO
12/13/2014*; 4:00 pm		Idaho	W 87–85	6–3	Frost Arena (2,221); Brookings, SD
12/18/2014*; 6:30 pm, MWN		vs. Idaho State; World Vision Classic	W 75–72 ^{OT}	7–3	Smith Spectrum (7,049); Logan, UT
12/19/2014*; 6:30 pm, MWN		vs. Cal State Bakersfield; World Vision Classic	W 53–49	8–3	Smith Spectrum (7,188); Logan, UT
12/20/2014*; 9:00 pm, ASN		at Utah State; World Vision Classic	W 68–65 ^{OT}	9–3	Smith Spectrum (7,216); Logan, UT
12/23/2014*; 8:00 pm, P12N		at No. 14 Utah	L 66–80	9–4	Jon M. Huntsman Center (10,322); Salt Lake City, UT
12/28/2014*; 2:00 pm		at No. 23 Northern Iowa	L 63–74	9–5	McLeod Center (6,333); Cedar Falls, IA
01/02/2015; 8:00 pm, ROOT RM		at Denver	L 69–76	9–6 (0–1)	Magness Arena (1,786); Denver, CO
01/04/2015; 4:00 pm, Midco/ESPN3		at North Dakota State	L 69–72	9–7 (0–2)	Scheels Arena (3,368); Fargo, ND
01/07/2015; 7:00 pm		Western Illinois	W 75–44	10–7 (1–2)	Frost Arena (1,407); Brookings, SD
01/10/2015; 4:30 pm, Midco/ESPN3		at Omaha	W 87–68	11–7 (2–2)	Ralston Arena (1,877); Ralston, NE
01/14/2015; 7:00 pm		IUPUI	W 68–52	12–7 (3–2)	Frost Arena (2,583); Brookings, SD
01/17/2015; 4:30 pm, Midco/ESPN3		South Dakota	W 71–57	13–7 (4–2)	Frost Arena (5,354); Brookings, SD
01/21/2015; 7:00 pm, Midco/ESPN3		IPFW	W 82–53	14–7 (5–2)	Frost Arena (2,394); Brookings, SD
01/24/2015; 7:00 pm, ESPN3		at Oral Roberts	W 76–72	15–7 (6–2)	Mabee Center (4,509); Tulsa, OK
01/28/2015; 7:00 pm		Omaha	W 86–64	16–7 (7–2)	Frost Arena (2,274); Brookings, SD
01/31/2015; 4:30 pm, Midco/ESPN3		Denver	W 69–39	17–7 (8–2)	Frost Arena (4,725); Brookings, SD
02/05/2015; 6:00 pm		at IPFW	L 74–84	17–8 (8–3)	Gates Sports Center (804); Fort Wayne, IN
02/07/2015; 12:00 pm, HTSN/ESPN3		at IUPUI	W 63–56	18–8 (9–3)	Indiana Farmers Coliseum (1,386); Indianapolis, IN
02/14/2015; 4:00 pm, Midco/ESPN3		North Dakota State	W 68–58	19–8 (10–3)	Frost Arena (4,912); Brookings, SD
02/18/2015; 7:00 pm		at Western Illinois	W 79–77	20–8 (11–3)	Western Hall (1,139); Macomb, IL
02/21/2015; 7:00 pm, Midco/ESPN3		Oral Roberts	W 81–52	21–8 (12–3)	Frost Arena (5,347); Brookings, SD
02/28/2015; 4:00 pm, Midco/ESPN3		at South Dakota	L 64–80	21–9 (12–4)	DakotaDome (4,812); Vermillion, SD
The Summit League tournament
03/07/2015; 6:00 pm, Midco/ESPN3		vs. Western Illinois; Quarterfinals	W 87–50	22–9	Denny Sanford PREMIER Center (9,773); Sioux Falls, SD
03/09/2015; 6:00 pm, Midco/ESPN3		vs. South Dakota; Semifinals	W 78–65	23–9	Denny Sanford PREMIER Center (10,153); Sioux Falls, SD
03/10/2015; 8:00 pm, ESPN2		vs. North Dakota State; Championship game	L 56–57	23–10	Denny Sanford PREMIER Center (9,033); Sioux Falls, SD
NIT
03/18/2015*; 9:00 pm, ESPNU	No. (8)	at (1) Colorado State; First round	W 86–76	24–10	Moby Arena (3,391); Fort Collins, CO
03/20/2015*; 8:30 pm, ESPNU	No. (8)	at (5) Vanderbilt; Second round	L 77–92	24–11	Memorial Gymnasium (5,605); Nashville, TN
*Non-conference game. ^{#}Rankings from AP Poll. (#) Tournament seedings in parentheses. All times are in Central Time. (#) during NIT is seed within region.
