= 2014–15 Stanford Cardinal men's basketball team =

American college basketball season

2014–15 Stanford Cardinal men's basketball

NIT Champions
- Conference: Pac-12 Conference
- Record: 24–13 (9–9 Pac-12)
- Head coach: Johnny Dawkins (7th season)
- Assistant coaches: Tim O'Toole; Charles Payne; Mike Schrage
- Home arena: Maples Pavilion

2014–15 Pac-12 Conference men's basketball standings
| | Conf. | | | | Overall |
| Team | W | | L | PCT | W | | L | PCT |
|---|---|---|---|---|---|---|---|---|
| No. 5 Arizona † | 16 | – | 2 | .889 | 34 | – | 4 | .895 |
| No. 25 Oregon | 13 | – | 5 | .722 | 26 | – | 10 | .722 |
| No. 19 Utah | 13 | – | 5 | .722 | 26 | – | 9 | .743 |
| UCLA | 11 | – | 7 | .611 | 22 | – | 14 | .611 |
| Stanford | 9 | – | 9 | .500 | 24 | – | 13 | .649 |
| Arizona State | 9 | – | 9 | .500 | 18 | – | 16 | .529 |
| Oregon State | 8 | – | 10 | .444 | 17 | – | 14 | .548 |
| California | 7 | – | 11 | .389 | 18 | – | 15 | .545 |
| Colorado | 7 | – | 11 | .389 | 16 | – | 18 | .471 |
| Washington State | 7 | – | 11 | .389 | 13 | – | 18 | .419 |
| Washington | 5 | – | 13 | .278 | 16 | – | 15 | .516 |
| USC | 3 | – | 15 | .167 | 12 | – | 20 | .375 |
† Pac-12 Tournament winner Rankings from AP poll

The 2014–15 Stanford Cardinal men's basketball team represented Stanford University during the 2014–15 NCAA Division I men's basketball season. The Cardinal, led by seventh year head coach Johnny Dawkins, played their home games at Maples Pavilion and were members of the Pac-12 Conference. They finished the season 24–13, 9–9 in Pac-12 play to finish in a tie for fifth place. They advanced to the quarterfinals of the Pac-12 tournament where they lost to Utah. They were invited to the National Invitation Tournament where they defeated UC Davis, Rhode Island, Vanderbilt, Old Dominion, and Miami (FL) to become NIT Champions. It was Stanford's second NIT Championship in four years.

== Previous season ==
The 2013–14 Stanford Cardinal finished the season with an overall record of 23–13, and 10–8 in the Pac-12 to finish in a five-way tie for third place. In the 2014 Pac-12 tournament, the team defeated Washington State and Arizona State before losing to UCLA, 84–59 in the semifinals. The Cardinal received an at-large bid to the 2014 NCAA tournament as a #10 seed in the South Region. The Cardinal made it to the Sweet 16 by defeating #7 seed New Mexico and #2 seed Kansas, before losing to #11 seed Dayton 82–72.

== Off-season ==
=== Departures ===
| Name | Number | Pos. | Height | Weight | Year | Hometown | Notes |
|---|---|---|---|---|---|---|---|
| Andy Brown | 11 | F | 6’7” | 215 | RS Senior | Yorba Linda, California | Graduated. |
| Aaron Bright | 2 | PG | 5’11” | 178 | Senior | Bellevue, Washington | Graduate transfer to St. Mary’s. |
| John Gage | 40 | PF | 6’10” | 225 | Senior | Vashon Island, Washington | Graduated. |
| Josh Huestis | 24 | F | 6’7” | 230 | Senior | Great Falls, Montana | Graduated/2014 NBA draft |
| Robbie Lemons | 10 | G | 6’3” | 205 | Senior | Carmichael, California | Graduated |
| Dwight Powell | 33 | PF | 6’10” | 240 | Senior | Toronto, Ontario | Graduated/2014 NBA draft |

=== 2014 recruiting class ===
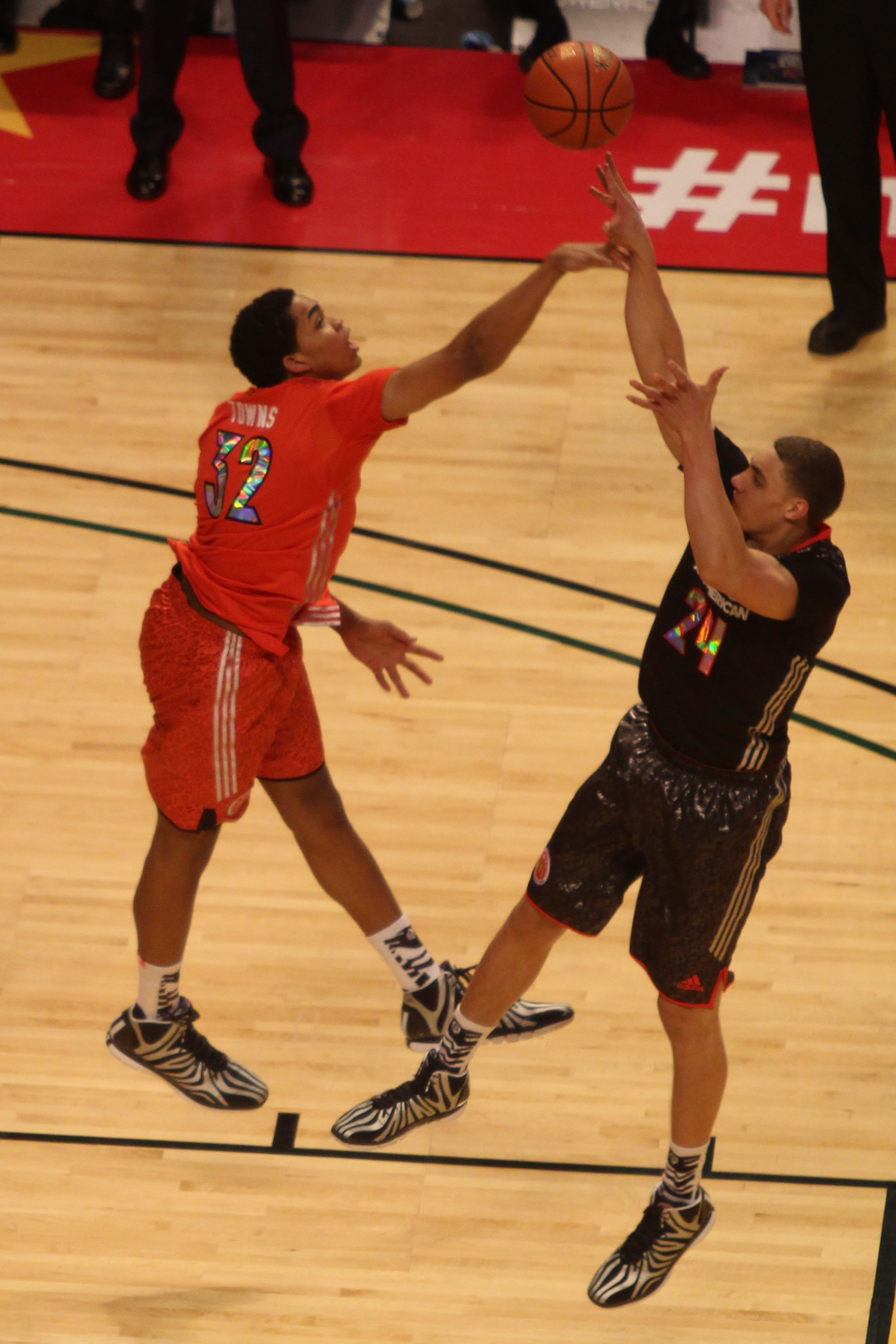
Reid Travis shooting over Karl-Anthony Towns in the 2014 McDonald's All-American Boys Game

College recruiting information
| Name | Hometown | School | Height | Weight | Commit date |
|---|---|---|---|---|---|
| Robert Cartwright; PG | La Canada, CA | Flintridge Prep | 6 ft 2 in (1.88 m) | 165 lb (75 kg) | Sep 4, 2013 |
| Robert Cartwright; PG | Recruit ratings: Scout: Rivals: 247Sports: ESPN: | | | | |
| Michael Humphrey; PF | Phoenix, AZ | Sunnyslope HS | 6 ft 10 in (2.08 m) | 200 lb (91 kg) | Oct 30, 2013 |
| Michael Humphrey; PF | Recruit ratings: Scout: Rivals: 247Sports: ESPN: | | | | |
| Reid Travis; PF | Minneapolis, MN | De La Salle HS | 6 ft 8 in (2.03 m) | 240 lb (110 kg) | Nov 8, 2013 |
| Reid Travis; PF | Recruit ratings: Scout: Rivals: 247Sports: ESPN: | | | | |
| Dorian Pickens; SG | Cave Creek, AZ | Pinnacle HS | 6 ft 4 in (1.93 m) | 190 lb (86 kg) | Nov 20, 2013 |
| Dorian Pickens; SG | Recruit ratings: Scout: Rivals: 247Sports: ESPN: | | | | |
Overall recruit ranking: Scout: #15 Rivals: #13 ESPN: #13
Note: In many cases, Scout, Rivals, 247Sports, On3, and ESPN may conflict in their listings of height and weight.; In these cases, the average was taken. ESPN grades are on a 100-point scale.; Sources: "2014 Stanford Basketball Commitment List". Rivals.; "2014 Stanford Basketball Recruiting Commits". Scout.; "2014 Stanford Basketball Commits". ESPN.; "Scout.com Team Recruiting Rankings". Scout.; "2014 Team Ranking". Rivals.

== Roster ==
2014–15 Stanford Cardinal men's basketball team
Players
Coaches

| Pos. | # | Name | Height | Weight | Year | Previous school | Hometown |
|---|---|---|---|---|---|---|---|
| G | 1 | Christian Sanders | 6 ft 4 in (1.93 m) | 185 lb (84 kg) | RS So | St. Thomas HS | Houston, Texas |
| G | 2 | Robert Cartwright | 6 ft 2 in (1.88 m) | 170 lb (77 kg) | Fr | Flintridge Prep | Pasadena, California |
| G | 3 | Malcolm Allen | 6 ft 1 in (1.85 m) | 180 lb (82 kg) | So | Centennial HS | Las Vegas, Nevada |
| C | 4 | Stefan Nastić | 6 ft 11 in (2.11 m) | 245 lb (111 kg) | RS Sr | Thornhill Secondary School | Thornhill, Ontario |
| G | 5 | Chasson Randle | 6 ft 2 in (1.88 m) | 185 lb (84 kg) | Sr | Rock Island HS | Rock Island, Illinois |
| F | 10 | Michael Humphrey | 6 ft 9 in (2.06 m) | 218 lb (99 kg) | Fr | Sunnyslope HS | Phoenix, Arizona |
| G/F | 11 | Dorain Pickens | 6 ft 5 in (1.96 m) | 210 lb (95 kg) | Fr | Pinnacle HS | Phoenix, Arizona |
| G/F | 14 | Jack Ryan (W) | 6 ft 8 in (2.03 m) | 210 lb (95 kg) | Sr | Glenbrook South HS | Glenview, Illinois |
| G | 15 | Marcus Allen | 6 ft 3 in (1.91 m) | 190 lb (86 kg) | So | Centennial HS | Las Vegas, Nevada |
| G | 20 | Wade Morgan (W) | 6 ft 1 in (1.85 m) | 175 lb (79 kg) | Sr | Delbarton School | South Orange, New Jersey |
| G/F | 21 | Anthony Brown | 6 ft 6 in (1.98 m) | 215 lb (98 kg) | RS Sr | Ocean View HS | Fountain Valley, California |
| F | 22 | Reid Travis | 6 ft 8 in (2.03 m) | 245 lb (111 kg) | Fr | DeLaSalle HS | Minneapolis, Minnesota |
| F | 25 | Rosco Allen | 6 ft 9 in (2.06 m) | 220 lb (100 kg) | Jr | Bishop Gorman HS | Budapest, Hungary |
| C | 30 | Grant Verhoeven | 6 ft 9 in (2.06 m) | 245 lb (111 kg) | Jr | Central Valley Christian HS | Hanford, California |
| F/C | 40 | Elliott Bullock | 6 ft 10 in (2.08 m) | 235 lb (107 kg) | RS Sr | Olympus HS | Salt Lake City, Utah |
| F/C | 42 | Nick Davidson | 6 ft 7 in (2.01 m) | 288 lb (131 kg) | Jr | Eden Prairie HS | Eden Prairie, Minnesota |

Head coach

- Johnny Dawkins (Duke)

Assistant coach(es)

- Tim O'Toole (Fairfield)
- Charles Payne (FIU)
- Mike Schrage (Indiana)

Legend

- (C) Team captain
- (S) Suspended
- (I) Ineligible
- (W) Walk-on
- Injured
- Current redshirt

Roster
Last update: 02/19/2015

=== Notes ===
- On December 28, 2014, Sophomore center Schuyler Rimmer announced on his Twitter that he would be transferring to Florida.

== Schedule ==
| Date time, TV | Rank^{#} | Opponent^{#} | Result | Record | Site (attendance) city, state |
Exhibition
| 11/06/2014*; 7:00 PM | | Cal Poly Pomona | W 79–76 | | Maples Pavilion (3,463); Stanford, CA |
Regular season
| 11/14/2014*; 7:00 PM, P12N | | Wofford; Coaches vs. Cancer Classic | W 74–59 | 1–0 | Maples Pavilion (3,650); Stanford, CA |
| 11/16/2014*; 9:00 PM, P12N | | South Dakota State; Coaches vs. Cancer Classic | W 84–73 | 2–0 | Maples Pavilion (5,025); Stanford, CA |
| 11/21/2014*; 4:00 PM, TruTV | | vs. UNLV; Coaches vs. Cancer Classic Semifinals | W 89–60 | 3–0 | Barclays Center (10,135); Brooklyn, NY |
| 11/22/2014*; 6:30 PM, TruTV | | vs. No. 4 Duke; Coaches vs. Cancer Classic Championship | L 59–70 | 3–1 | Barclays Center (10,046); Brooklyn, NY |
| 11/25/2014*; 8:00 PM, P12N | | Delaware | W 84–47 | 4–1 | Maples Pavilion (4,075); Stanford, CA |
| 11/30/2014*; 11:30 AM, FS1 | | at DePaul | L 72–87 | 4–2 | Allstate Arena (5,990); Rosemont, IL |
| 12/13/2014*; 3:00 PM, P12N | | Denver | W 49–43 | 5–2 | Maples Pavilion (4,018); Stanford, CA |
| 12/17/2014*; 6:00 PM, P12N | | Loyola Marymount | W 67–58 | 6–2 | Maples Pavilion (4,088); Stanford, CA |
| 12/20/2014*; 8:00 pm, ESPNU | | at BYU | L 77–79 | 6–3 | Marriott Center (13,247); Provo, UT |
| 12/23/2014*; 4:00 PM, ESPN2 | | at No. 9 Texas | W 74–71 ^{OT} | 7–3 | Frank Erwin Center (13,661); Austin, TX |
| 12/29/2014*; 8:00 PM, P12N | | Arkansas–Pine Bluff | W 74–39 | 8–3 | Maples Pavilion (4,337); Stanford, CA |
| 01/02/2015; 12:00 PM, P12N | | Washington State | W 71–56 | 9–3 (1–0) | Maples Pavilion (4,373); Stanford, CA |
| 01/04/2015; 7:00 PM, ESPNU | | No. 21 Washington | W 68–60 ^{OT} | 10–3 (2–0) | Maples Pavilion (4,368); Stanford, CA |
| 01/08/2015; 6:00 PM, ESPN | | at UCLA | L 81–86 ^{2OT} | 10–4 (2–1) | Pauley Pavilion (7,379); Los Angeles, CA |
| 01/11/2015; 7:00 PM, ESPNU | | at USC | W 78–76 | 11–4 (3–1) | Galen Center (3,987); Los Angeles, CA |
| 01/14/2015; 8:00 PM, ESPNU | | at California | W 69–59 | 12–4 (4–1) | Haas Pavilion (8,819); Berkeley, CA |
| 01/17/2015*; 6:00 PM, ESPN2 | | UConn | W 72–59 | 13–4 | Maples Pavilion (7,104); Stanford, CA |
| 01/22/2015; 6:00 PM, ESPN2 | | No. 7 Arizona | L 82–89 | 13–5 (4–2) | Maples Pavilion (6,943); Stanford, CA |
| 01/24/2015; 9:00 PM, ESPNU | | Arizona State | W 89–70 | 14–5 (5–2) | Maples Pavilion (4,009); Stanford, CA |
| 01/28/2015; 8:00 PM, ESPNU | | at Washington | W 84–74 | 15–5 (6–2) | Alaska Airlines Arena (6,832); Seattle, WA |
| 01/31/2015; 5:00 PM, P12N | | at Washington State | L 88–89 | 15–6 (6–3) | Beasley Coliseum (3,073); Pullman, WA |
| 02/05/2015; 6:00 PM, ESPN2 | | UCLA | L 67–69 | 15–7 (6–4) | Maples Pavilion (5,298); Stanford, CA |
| 02/08/2015; 5:30 PM, ESPNU | | USC | W 70–62 | 16–7 (7–4) | Maples Pavilion (5,409); Stanford, CA |
| 02/12/2015; 6:00 PM, P12N | | at No. 11 Utah | L 59–75 | 16–8 (7–5) | Jon M. Huntsman Center (15,018); Salt Lake City, UT |
| 02/15/2015; 1:00 PM, FS1 | | at Colorado | L 58–64 | 16–9 (7–6) | Coors Events Center (9,138); Boulder, CO |
| 02/21/2015; 3:30 PM, P12N | | California | W 72–61 | 17–9 (8–6) | Maples Pavilion (6,177); Stanford, CA |
| 02/26/2015; 8:00 PM, P12N | | Oregon State | W 75–48 | 18–9 (9–6) | Maples Pavilion (4,012); Stanford, CA |
| 03/01/2015; 4:00 PM, FS1 | | Oregon | L 70–73 | 18–10 (9–7) | Maples Pavilion (7,233); Stanford, CA |
| 03/05/2015; 8:00 PM, FS1 | | at Arizona State | L 62–67 | 18–11 (9–8) | Wells Fargo Arena (5,345); Tempe, AZ |
| 03/07/2015; 1:00 PM, CBS | | at No. 5 Arizona | L 69–91 | 18–12 (9–9) | McKale Center (14,655); Tucson, AZ |
Pac-12 tournament
| 03/11/2015; 8:30 PM, P12N | | vs. Washington; First round | W 71–69 | 19–12 | MGM Grand Garden Arena (9,875); Paradise, NV |
| 03/12/2015; 8:30 PM, ESPN | | vs. No. 17 Utah; Quarterfinals | L 56–80 | 19–13 | MGM Grand Garden Arena (12,916); Paradise, NV |
NIT
| 03/17/2015*; 8:00 pm, ESPN2 | No. (2) | (7) UC Davis; First round | W 77–64 | 20–13 | Maples Pavilion (1,436); Stanford, CA |
| 03/22/2015*; 6:30 pm, ESPNU | No. (2) | (3) Rhode Island; Second round | W 74–65 | 21–13 | Maples Pavilion (1,235); Stanford, CA |
| 03/24/2015*; 6:00 pm, ESPN | No. (2) | (5) Vanderbilt; Quarterfinals | W 78–75 | 22–13 | Maples Pavilion (1,546); Stanford, CA |
| 03/31/2015*; 6:30 pm, ESPN | No. (2) | vs. (1) Old Dominion; Semifinals | W 67–60 | 23–13 | Madison Square Garden (7,185); New York, NY |
| 04/01/2015*; 6:00 pm, ESPN | No. (2) | vs. (2) Miami (FL); Championship game | W 66–64 ^{OT} | 24–13 | Madison Square Garden (6,600); New York, NY |
*Non-conference game. ^{#}Rankings from AP Poll. (#) Tournament seedings in parentheses. All times are in Pacific Time. (#) during NIT is seed within region.

== Ranking movement ==
Legend: ██ Increase in ranking. ██ Decrease in ranking.
| Poll | Pre | Wk 2 | Wk 3 | Wk 4 | Wk 5 | Wk 6 | Wk 7 | Wk 8 | Wk 9 | Wk 10 | Wk 11 | Wk 12 | Wk 13 | Wk 14 | Wk 15 | Wk 16 | Wk 17 | Wk 18 | Post | Final |
|---|---|---|---|---|---|---|---|---|---|---|---|---|---|---|---|---|---|---|---|---|
| AP | RV | RV | RV | NR | NR | NR | NR | RV | RV | NR | RV | RV | RV | NR | NR | NR | NR | NR | NR | N/A |
| Coaches | RV | RV | RV | RV | NR | NR | NR | RV | RV | RV | 25 | RV | RV | NR | NR | NR | NR | NR | NR | NR |
