= Lawrence Alexander (basketball) =

American basketball player (born 1991)

No. 6 – Oberwart Gunners
- Position: Point guard / shooting guard
- League: Austrian Basketball Superliga

Personal information
- Born: October 22, 1991 (age 35) Peoria, Illinois
- Listed height: 6 ft 2 in (1.88 m)
- Listed weight: 180 lb (82 kg)

Career information
- High school: Manual (Peoria, Illinois)
- College: North Dakota State (2011–2015)
- NBA draft: 2015: undrafted
- Playing career: 2015–present

Career history
- 2015–2016: BG Göttingen
- 2016–2018: Horsens IC
- 2018–2019: BK Levickí Patrioti
- 2019–present: Oberwart Gunners

Career highlights
- Summit League Player of the Year (2015); First-team All-Summit League (2015); Second-team All-Summit League (2013); Summit League tournament MVP (2015); Summit League Newcomer of the Year (2012)

Lawrence Alexander (born October 22, 1991) is an American basketball player for Oberwart Gunners in the Austrian Basketball Superliga. He played college basketball for the North Dakota State Bison. He can play both point guard and shooting guard.

== High school career ==
Alexander attended Manual High School in Peoria, Illinois. As a senior, he averaged 15 points, 5 rebounds and 3 assists per game. His team were the 2A state runners-up. He was a first-team all-conference and all-state pick.

== College career ==
As a senior in 2014–15, Alexander averaged 20.8 points per game. He was named the Summit League Player of the Year that season, and led the Bison to a regular season Summit League championship and an NCAA tournament berth.

== Professional career ==
Following his college career, Alexander signed with Mitteldeutscher BC of the German Bundesliga. After being waived, Alexander joined BG Göttingen on a trial contract, but has since signed a two-year contract with Horsens IC of the Danish league Basketligaen. After two seasons with Horsens IC, Alexander signed one-year deal with BK Levickí Patrioti (Slovakia).

Alexander signed with the Oberwart Gunners in Austria in 2019. He averaged 17 points, 5.3 rebounds, and 3.4 assists per game. On November 6, 2020, Alexander re-signed with the team.
