= WFWA =

Television station in Fort Wayne, Indiana, U.S.

- Fort Wayne, Indiana; United States
- Channels: Digital: 18 (UHF); Virtual: 39
- Branding: PBS Fort Wayne

Programming
- Affiliations: 39.1: PBS; for others, see § Subchannels

Ownership
- Owner: Fort Wayne Public Television, Inc.

History
- Founded: February 2, 1975 (establishment of W39AA)
- First air date: December 5, 1986
- Former channel numbers: Analog: 39 (UHF, 1986–2009); Digital: 40 (UHF, 2003–2018)
- Call sign meaning: "Fort Wayne"

Technical information
- Licensing authority: FCC
- Facility ID: 22108
- ERP: 350 kW
- HAAT: 219.1 m (719 ft)
- Transmitter coordinates: 41°6′13″N 85°11′28″W

Links
- Public license information: Public file; LMS
- Website: www.pbsfortwayne.org

WFWA (channel 39) is a PBS member television station in Fort Wayne, Indiana, United States. Owned by Fort Wayne Public Television, Inc., the station maintains studios at the Dr. Rudy and Rhonda Kachmann Teleplex on the campus of Purdue University Fort Wayne at the corner of East Coliseum Boulevard and Crescent Avenue, and its transmitter is located at its former studio facility on Butler Road in Fort Wayne.

== History ==
On February 2, 1975, W39AA, a translator of WBGU-TV in Bowling Green, Ohio, signed on the air on channel 39; the coverage of W39AA was generally restricted to the immediate Fort Wayne area, as its coverage was not powerful enough to cover the entire market. This low-power repeater station was merely a placeholder, as channel 39 was allocated as a full-power educational channel in Fort Wayne. In December 1985, the station became a translator of Indianapolis PBS station WFYI, after the translator was allowed to originate programming.

In October 1984, Fort Wayne Public Television applied to build a full-power station on channel 39. The FCC approved on January 29, 1985; WFWA signed on the air on December 5, 1986, bringing northeast Indiana its own PBS station for the first time ever. However, it was not until October 1, 1989, that WFWA was programmed separately from WFYI.

In 2003, WFWA became the first television station in the Fort Wayne market to broadcast a digital signal, originally carrying the national PBS HDTV feed on a separate subchannel from its regular programming; funding issues would later cause the national HD feed to be pulled, leaving all programming in standard definition for several years. It was announced that WFWA's main channel 39.1 would broadcast in high-definition full-time at some point during summer 2010. During a summer 2010 pledge break, general manager Bruce Haines announced that the change would occur on July 4, 2010, at 7:30 p.m. Due to advancements in video compression, the station was able to upgrade its main channel to HD without sacrificing the video quality of its other three SD subchannels.

In May 2013, the station announced a fundraising drive to upgrade its infrastructure over the next three years, including a signal boost, the purchase of remote production equipment, and improvements to the station's master control.

== Technical information ==
=== Subchannels ===
The station's signal is multiplexed:

Subchannels of WFWA
Channel	Res.	Aspect	Short name	Programming
39.1	1080i	16:9	PBS FW	PBS
39.2	480i	16:9	PBSKIDS	PBS Kids
39.3	480i	16:9	CREATE	Create
39.4	480i	16:9	EXPLORE	World
39.5	1080i	16:9	PBS WX	PBS Fort Wayne WX
39.6	720p	16:9	PBS ARS	ACPL audio reading service

Previously, WFWA had shown the national PBS Kids feed (also seen nationally on digital cable/satellite) on channel 39.2. The service ended on September 26, 2005, but WFWA continued the channel by self-programming it locally until 2017, when the national 24/7 PBS Kids Channel relaunched.

Channel 39.3 was originally a 24-hour delayed feed from PBS ("PBS Encore"), but it was replaced by the national Create TV channel on July 1, 2006.

WFWA aired the Annenberg/CPB Channel on 39.4 until October 1, 2008. The satellite feed for Annenberg was discontinued at that time. The subchannel was then programmed locally with news and information programming and other documentaries supplied by PBS and various public media distributors. It was originally branded as "39-4you" (using a similar logo to PBS YOU, though it had no affiliation with that retired service), and later became known as "Explore" in 2014. On January 1, 2026, the subchannel became affiliated with the national World Channel.

Channel 39.5 officially launched on July 1, 2019, providing local weather radar and forecasts on screen, with audio from NOAA Weather Radio.

Channel 39.6 began broadcasting in May 2025 as a dedicated channel for Allen County Public Library's audio reading service. The audio feed was first broadcast via SAP on channel 39.4.

=== Analog-to-digital conversion ===
WFWA ended regular programming on its analog signal, over UHF channel 39, on February 17, 2009, the original target date on which full-power television stations in the United States were to transition from analog to digital broadcasts under federal mandate (which was later pushed back to June 12, 2009). The station's digital signal remained on its pre-transition UHF channel 40, using virtual channel 39.

As part of the SAFER Act, WFWA kept its analog signal on the air for 2+ weeks to inform viewers of the digital television transition through a loop of public service announcements from the National Association of Broadcasters.
