= Hometown Sports Indiana =

Indianapolis, Indiana-area sports TV channel

Hometown Sports and News (HTSN)
- HomeTown Sports Indiana Logo used 2009 until 2016
- Country: United States
- Headquarters: Noblesville, Indiana

Programming
- Language: English
- Picture format: 480i (SDTV); 720p (HDTV)

Ownership
- Owner: HomeTown Television 2002-2009 Webstream Sports 2009-2016 in Partnership with Scripps Company|Scripps]] (2013–2016)

History
- Launched: July 4, 2002; 23 years ago
- Closed: October 1, 2016; 9 years ago
- Former names: Hometown Television Sports and Hometown Sports Indiana (cable) "6 News 24/7" (WRTV 6.2)

Links
- Website: hometownsportsindiana.com

Hometown Sports Indiana (HTSI) was a division of Webstream Productions, who purchased Hometown Television Corporation in 2009. HomeTown Sports Indiana was founded by Rick Vanderwielen in 2002 as a leased channel on Insight Cable. Later Comcast elevated HTSI to a state-wide 24/7 television network airing ultra-regional sports. Webstream, in partnership with WRTV, Channel 6.2 in Indianapolis began airing content exclusive after the completion of the Comcast contract. The network was viewable in nearly 1,000,000 cabled homes in the Indianapolis, Lafayette and Terre Haute DMAs. HTSI was the official producer of Indiana High School Athletic Association (IHSAA) championship events and has produced many championship events both within Indiana and nationally. Notable broadcasts in 2009–2010 included:

1. Indiana Bowling State Championship
2. Great Lakes Valley Conference Volleyball, Basketball and Baseball Championships
3. University of Indianapolis Football and Basketball
4. Wabash College, Franklin College and Marian University Football
5. State Championships in Volleyball, Softball, Basketball, Football and Soccer.

In 2010, the Indianapolis Indians announced their home baseball games would be aired live on HomeTown Sports Indiana

The channel later switched its branding to Hometown Sports and News (HTSN) which featured a 24/7 rolling news wheel format with news, weather and sports updates, alongside features from "The List" and "Right This Minute", two of Scripps' internally-syndicated programs. It also included "Call 6 Investigations" and "Don't Waste Your Money" features. The channel retained live local and regional high school sports events, along with "The Outdoorsman with Buck McNeely". E/I programming was carried on Sunday mornings.

Starting with the team's 2014–2015 inaugural season, the channel carried coverage of Indy Fuel ECHL hockey. Both the Fuel and Indians retained online streaming rights, meaning that HTSI's online feed was unable to carry their games.

The network ended operations on October 1, 2016, and was replaced with a full-time feed of GRIT, due to the cost of sports rights and a chain-wide deal (and eventually common ownership) forcing the station to carry that network.
