= 2014 Maui Invitational =

2014 Maui Invitational Tournament
- Season: 2014–15
- Teams: 8
- Finals site: Lahaina Civic Center, Maui, Hawaii
- Champions: Arizona (2nd title)
- Runner-up: San Diego State (1st title game)
- Semifinalists: Kansas State (2nd semifinal); Pittsburgh (1st semifinal)
- Winning coach: Sean Miller (1st title)
- MVP: Stanley Johnson (Arizona)

The 2014 Maui Invitational Tournament was an early-season college basketball tournament that was played, for the 31st time, from November 14 to November 26, 2014. The tournament began in 1984, and was part of the 2014–15 NCAA Division I men's basketball season. The Championship Round was played at the Lahaina Civic Center in Maui, Hawaii from November 24 to 26.

== Brackets ==
* – Denotes overtime period

=== Opening round ===
The opening round was played on November 14–18 at various sites around the country.

==== November 14 ====
- Purdue 80, Samford 40 in West Lafayette, Indiana
- San Diego State 79, Cal State Northridge 58 in San Diego, California
- UMKC 69, Missouri 61 in Columbia, Missouri

==== November 16 ====
- Pittsburgh 63, Samford 56 in Pittsburgh, Pennsylvania
- Arizona 86, Cal State Northridge 68 in Tucson, Arizona

==== November 17 ====
- Kansas State 83, UMKC 73 in Manhattan, Kansas

==== November 18 ====
- BYU 91, Arkansas–Little Rock 62 in Provo, Utah (BYUtv)

== Regional round ==
Games played at the Jack Stephens Center in Little Rock, Arkansas

Semifinals; November 22
1	Samford	72
4	Cal State Northridge	79
3	UMKC	68
2	Arkansas–Little Rock	73

Final; November 23
Cal State Northridge	88
Arkansas–Little Rock	94
Third-place game
Samford	64
UMKC	55

== Championship round ==
The Championship round occurred from November 24–26 at Lahaina Civic Center in Maui, Hawaii.

Fifth Place Game; November 26
Purdue	87*
BYU	85
Seventh Place Game
Missouri	74
Chaminade	60

Consolation 2nd Round; November 25
Purdue	82
Missouri	61
Chaminade	85
BYU	121

Quarterfinals; November 24
Purdue	79
Kansas State	88
Missouri	53
3	Arizona	72
Pittsburgh	81
Chaminade	68
BYU	87
15	San Diego State	92**

Semifinals; November 25
Kansas State	68
3	Arizona	72
Pittsburgh	57
15	San Diego State	74

Championship; November 26
3	Arizona	61
15	San Diego State	59
Third-place game
Kansas State	47
Pittsburgh	70
