= 2014–15 Grand Canyon Antelopes men's basketball team =

American college basketball season

2014–15 Grand Canyon Antelopes men's basketball
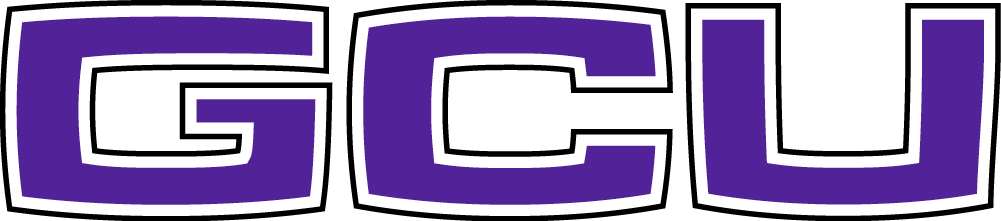

CIT, First round
- Conference: Western Athletic Conference
- Record: 17–15 (8–6 WAC)
- Head coach: Dan Majerle (2nd season)
- Assistant coaches: Todd Lee; Chris Crevelone; TJ Benson
- Home arena: GCU Arena

2014–15 WAC men's basketball standings
	Conf.				Overall
Team	W		L	PCT	W		L	PCT
New Mexico State †	13	–	1	.929	23	–	11	.676
Grand Canyon *	8	–	6	.571	17	–	15	.531
UMKC	8	–	6	.571	14	–	19	.424
Seattle	7	–	7	.500	18	–	16	.529
Cal State Bakersfield	7	–	7	.500	14	–	19	.424
Utah Valley	5	–	9	.357	11	–	19	.367
Chicago State	4	–	10	.286	8	–	24	.250
Texas–Pan American	4	–	10	.286	10	–	21	.323
† 2015 WAC tournament winner * ineligible due to transition from NCAA Division II.

The 2014–15 Grand Canyon Antelopes men's basketball team represented Grand Canyon University during the 2014–15 NCAA Division I men's basketball season. This was head coach Dan Majerle's second season at Grand Canyon. This season was year 2 of a 4-year transition period from Division II to Division I. As a result, the Antelopes were not eligible to make the NCAA Tournament and did not participate WAC Basketball Tournament. However the Antelopes could compete in the NIT, CIT, or CBI tournaments should they be invited. They finished the season 17–15, 8–6 in WAC play to finish in a tie for second place. They were invited to the CollegeInsider.com Tournament where they lost in the first round to Northern Arizona.

== Previous season ==
The Antelopes finished the season 15–15, 10–6 in WAC play to finish in third place. They were invited to the CollegeInsider.com Tournament where they lost in the first round to Pacific.

== Broadcast Coverage ==
For the second consecutive season, all of the Lopes home games are broadcast exclusively on Cox7 Arizona after the two parties reached a two-year agreement. Cox7 will broadcast all of GCU's home games through the 2015-16 season which will be the Lopes' third in Division I.

The broadcast crew received an off-season shakeup, with former sideline reporter Barry Buetel shifting to the play-by-play duties. Joining Buetel is three-time NBA champion Scott Williams on the analysis and Kyndra de St. Aubin as the new sideline reporter. The broadcasts consist of a 30-minute pregame show and limited commercial advertising throughout, allowing for viewers to experience more of the in-arena atmosphere at Grand Canyon.

== Roster ==
2014–15 Grand Canyon Antelopes men's basketball team
Players
Coaches

Pos.	#	Name	Height	Weight	Year	Previous school	Hometown
G	0	DeWayne Russell	5 ft 11 in (1.8 m)	155 lb (70 kg)	RS Jr	Peoria; Northern Arizona	Peoria, AZ
G	1	Isaiah Juarez	6 ft 3 in (1.91 m)	180 lb (82 kg)	Fr	Mater Dei	Tustin, CA
G	2	Joshua Braun	6 ft 4 in (1.93 m)	195 lb (88 kg)	RS Fr	Westwind Prep Academy	Anthem, AZ
G	3	Sam Daly	6 ft 3 in (1.91 m)	175 lb (79 kg)	So	Unley	Adelaide, Australia
G	4	Ryan Majerle	6 ft 3 in (1.91 m)	190 lb (86 kg)	RS Jr	Rockford; Grand Valley State; Toledo	Rockford, MI
F	5	Matt Jackson	6 ft 8 in (2.03 m)	210 lb (95 kg)	Fr	Diamond Valley	Diamond Creek, Australia
F	10	Jevon Estelle	6 ft 3 in (1.91 m)	210 lb (95 kg)	Jr	Winslow	Winslow, AZ
G	11	De'Andre Davis	6 ft 1 in (1.85 m)	180 lb (82 kg)	Fr	Cedar Ridge	Round Rock, TX
F	12	Daniel Alexander	6 ft 9 in (2.06 m)	217 lb (98 kg)	RS Sr	Dripping Springs; Texas A&M	Austin, TX
F	13	Kerwin Smith	6 ft 9 in (2.06 m)	200 lb (91 kg)	Fr	Woodrow Wilson	Dallas, TX
C	15	Boubacar Toure	6 ft 11 in (2.11 m)	215 lb (98 kg)	Fr	Phase One Academy	Dekar, Senegal
G	21	Jerome Garrison	6 ft 3 in (1.91 m)	178 lb (81 kg)	Sr	Mountain Pointe	Phoenix, AZ
G	22	Royce Woolridge	6 ft 3 in (1.91 m)	180 lb (82 kg)	RS Sr	Sunnyslope HS; Kansas; Washington State	Phoenix, AZ
G	24	Adrian Carrion Armas	5 ft 11 in (1.8 m)	168 lb (76 kg)	Fr	Canarias Basketball Academy	Seville, Spain
F	25	Miroslav Jakšić	6 ft 11 in (2.11 m)	220 lb (100 kg)	RS Fr	Walled Lake	Windsor, ON
G	42	Gerard Martin	6 ft 6 in (1.98 m)	195 lb (88 kg)	Fr	Australian Institute of Sport	Manly, Australia
C	50	Tobe Okafor	6 ft 11 in (2.11 m)	230 lb (104 kg)	Jr	Maine Central; Western Texas College	Lagos, Nigeria

Head coach

- Dan Majerle (Central Michigan)

Assistant coach(es)

- Todd Lee (Azusa Pacific)
- Chris Crevelone (Adams State)
- TJ Benson (Grand Canyon)

Legend

- (C) Team captain
- (S) Suspended
- (I) Ineligible
- (W) Walk-on
- Injured
- Current redshirt

Roster

== Schedule and results ==
Date time, TV	Opponent	Result	Record	Site (attendance) city, state
Exhibition
11/06/2014*; 7:00 pm, Cox7	Western New Mexico	W 74–47		GCU Arena (7,133); Phoenix, AZ
Regular season
11/14/2014*; 6:00 pm, SECN	at No. 1 Kentucky; Cawood Ledford Classic	L 45–85	0–1	Rupp Arena (22,533); Lexington, KY
11/17/2014*; 7:00 pm, Cox7	Montana State; Cawood Ledford Classic	W 61–45	1–1	GCU Arena (6,527); Phoenix, AZ
11/20/2014*; 7:00 pm, Cox7	Texas–Arlington; Cawood Ledford Classic	L 64–66	1–2	GCU Arena (5,207); Phoenix, AZ
11/21/2014*; 7:00 pm, Cox7	Florida A&M	W 64–49	2–2	GCU Arena (5,866); Phoenix, AZ
11/25/2014*; 7:00 pm, Cox7	Buffalo; Cawood Ledford Classic	L 64–80	2–3	GCU Arena (5,688); Phoenix, AZ
11/29/2014*; 4:00 pm	at Central Michigan	L 77–79	2–4	McGuirk Arena (1,465); Mount Pleasant, MI
12/02/2014*; 6:00 pm	at UIC	W 66–61	3–4	UIC Pavilion (1,731); Chicago, IL
12/06/2014*; 7:00 pm, Cox7	Great Falls	W 80–61	4–4	GCU Arena (4,812); Phoenix, AZ
12/09/2014*; 7:00 pm, Cox7	Idaho State	L 51–67	4–5	GCU Arena (4,766); Phoenix, AZ
12/13/2014*; 3:00 pm, BTN	at Indiana	L 66–94	4–6	Assembly Hall (17,472); Bloomington, IN
12/15/2014*; 7:00 pm, Cox7	Bethune-Cookman	W 60–50	5–6	GCU Arena (3,826); Phoenix, AZ
12/17/2014*; 7:00 pm, Cox7	Incarnate Word	L 80–82	5–7	GCU Arena (4,692); Phoenix, AZ
12/20/2014*; 7:00 pm, Cox7	St. Edward's	W 81–55	6–7	GCU Arena (3,334); Phoenix, AZ
12/23/2014*; 7:00 pm, Cox7	New Mexico	W 68–65	7–7	GCU Arena (6,340); Phoenix, AZ
12/28/2014*; 4:00 pm, Cox7	Abilene Christian	W 83–81	8–7	GCU Arena (3,968); Phoenix, AZ
12/30/2014*; 6:00 pm, ASN	Harvard	L 59–72	8–8	GCU Arena (7,412); Phoenix, AZ
01/04/2015*; 4:00 pm, Cox7	UC Riverside	W 71–69	9–8	GCU Arena (3,714); Phoenix, AZ
01/10/2015; 7:00 pm, Cox7	Cal State Bakersfield	W 73–65	10–8 (1–0)	GCU Arena (5,662); Phoenix, AZ
01/15/2015; 7:00 pm	at Utah Valley	W 83–74	11–8 (2–0)	UCCU Center (1,426); Orem, UT
01/22/2015; 7:00 pm, AggieVision	at New Mexico State	L 63–85	11–9 (2–1)	Pan American Center (5,577); Las Cruces, NM
01/24/2015; 6:00 pm	at Texas–Pan American	L 72–73	11–10 (2–2)	UTPA Fieldhouse (1,037); Edinburg, TX
01/29/2015; 7:00 pm, Cox7	UMKC	W 78–57	12–10 (3–2)	GCU Arena (5,121); Phoenix, AZ
01/31/2015; 7:00 pm, Cox7	Chicago State	W 55–54	12–11 (3–3)	GCU Arena (5,302); Phoenix, AZ
02/05/2015; 7:00 pm, ASN	at Seattle	W 66–64	13–11 (4–3)	KeyArena (1,682); Seattle, WA
02/07/2015; 7:00 pm, ASN	at Cal State Bakersfield	W 78–73	14–11 (5–3)	Icardo Center (1,660); Bakersfield, CA
02/14/2015; 7:00 pm, Cox7	Utah Valley	W 83–57	15–11 (6–3)	GCU Arena (6,116); Phoenix, AZ
02/19/2015; 7:00 pm, Cox7	Texas–Pan American	W 64–59	16–11 (7–3)	GCU Arena (5,501); Phoenix, AZ
02/21/2015; 7:00 pm, ASN	New Mexico State	L 55–72	16–12 (7–4)	GCU Arena (7,050); Phoenix, AZ
02/26/2015; 6:00 pm	at Chicago State	L 70–74	16–13 (7–5)	Emil and Patricia Jones Convocation Center (568); Chicago, IL
02/28/2015; 5:00 pm	at UMKC	L 65–70	16–14 (7–6)	Municipal Auditorium (1,917); Kansas City, MO
03/07/2015; 5:00 pm, Cox7	Seattle	W 83–70	17–14 (8–6)	GCU Arena (7,077); Phoenix, AZ
CIT
03/18/2015*; 6:00 pm, Cox7	Northern Arizona; First round	L 70–75	17–15	GCU Arena (5,702); Phoenix, AZ
*Non-conference game. ^{#}Rankings from AP Poll. (#) Tournament seedings in parentheses. All times are in Mountain Time.
