= 2014–15 Chicago State Cougars men's basketball team =

American college basketball season

2014–15 Chicago State Cougars men's basketball
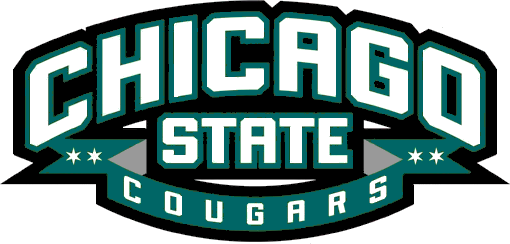
- Conference: Western Athletic Conference
- Record: 8–24 (4–10 WAC)
- Head coach: Tracy Dildy (5th season)
- Assistant coaches: James Farr; Sean Pryor; Matt Raidbard
- Home arena: Emil and Patricia Jones Convocation Center

2014–15 WAC men's basketball standings
	Conf.				Overall
Team	W		L	PCT	W		L	PCT
New Mexico State †	13	–	1	.929	23	–	11	.676
Grand Canyon *	8	–	6	.571	17	–	15	.531
UMKC	8	–	6	.571	14	–	19	.424
Seattle	7	–	7	.500	18	–	16	.529
Cal State Bakersfield	7	–	7	.500	14	–	19	.424
Utah Valley	5	–	9	.357	11	–	19	.367
Chicago State	4	–	10	.286	8	–	24	.250
Texas–Pan American	4	–	10	.286	10	–	21	.323
† 2015 WAC tournament winner * ineligible due to transition from NCAA Division II.

The 2014–15 Chicago State Cougars men's basketball team represented Chicago State University during the 2014–15 NCAA Division I men's basketball season. The Cougars, led by fifth year head coach Tracy Dildy, played their home games at the Emil and Patricia Jones Convocation Center and were members of the Western Athletic Conference. They finished the season 8–24, 4–10 in WAC play to finish in a tie for seventh place. They lost in the quarterfinals of the WAC tournament to Seattle.

== Roster ==
Number	Name	Position	Height	Weight	Year	Hometown
0	Sean Hill	Guard	6–2	180	Senior	Chicago, Illinois
1	Joshua Meier	Forward	6–8	215	Freshman	Justice, Illinois
2	Anthony Glover	Guard	6–2	175	Freshman	Toledo, Ohio
3	Johnny Griffin	Guard	6–5	190	Sophomore	Ford Heights, Illinois
5	Trayvon Palmer	Guard/Forward	6–4	185	Sophomore	Milwaukee, Wisconsin
10	Kurt Karis	Guard	6–1	190	Sophomore	Northbrook, Illinois
11	Jared Dimakos	Guard/Forward	6–5	205	RS Junior	Lincolnshire, Illinois
14	Rahjan Muhammad	Guard	6–0	190	Senior	Bolingbrook, Illinois
15	Elijah Robertson	Guard/Forward	6–5	185	Freshman	Bolingbrook, Illinois
21	Joshua Batson	Guard	6–0	175	Junior	Chicago, Illinois
23	Aaron Williams	Forward	6–6	205	Graduate Student	Chicago, Illinois
25	Sharieff Medlock	Guard	6–3	185	Freshman	Chicago, Illinois
32	Montana Bryd	Guard	6–4	215	Freshman	Chicago, Illinois
33	Jawad Adekoya	Guard/Forward	6–6	190	Junior	Tinley Park, Illinois
35	Clarke Rosenberg	Guard	6–4	195	Senior	Skokie, Illinois
42	Michael Johnson	Forward	6–8	230	Senior	Chicago, Illinois
44	Quron Davis	Center	6–10	235	Sophomore	Chicago, Illinois
45	Jesse Tesmer	Forward	6–8	225	Junior	Greencastle, Indiana

== Schedule and results ==
Date time, TV	Opponent	Result	Record	Site (attendance) city, state
Non-conference regular season
11/14/2014*; 9:00 pm, P12N	at Arizona State; CBE Hall of Fame Classic	L 50–86	0–1	Wells Fargo Arena (5,295); Tempe, AZ
11/16/2014*; 4:30 pm, FS1	at Creighton	L 66–84	0–2	CenturyLink Center (16,143); Omaha, NE
11/18/2014*; 7:05 pm	Indiana-Northwest	W 102–51	1–2	Emil and Patricia Jones Convocation Center (N/A); Chicago, IL
11/22/2014*; 2:05 pm	Trinity Christian	W 75–52	2–2	Emil and Patricia Jones Convocation Center (N/A); Chicago, IL
11/24/2014*; 3:30 pm	vs. Georgia State; CBE Hall of Fame Classic	L 46–69	2–3	Athletics Center O'rena (125); Rochester, MI
11/25/2014*; 6:00 pm	at Oakland; CBE Hall of Fame Classic	L 57–70	2–4	Athletics Center O'rena (1,377); Rochester, MI
11/26/2014*; 3:30 pm	vs. Western Carolina; CBE Hall of Fame Classic	L 61–66	2–5	Athletics Center O'rena (130); Rochester, MI
11/29/2014*; 2:00 pm, ESPN3	at Notre Dame	L 42–90	2–6	Edmund P. Joyce Center (5,381); South Bend, IN
12/04/2014*; 7:05 pm	DePaul	L 60–84	2–7	Emil and Patricia Jones Convocation Center (754); Chicago, IL
12/06/2014*; 1:00 pm	at Toledo	L 59–87	2–8	Savage Arena (4,748); Toledo, OH
12/14/2014*; 3:05 pm	at Southern Illinois	L 50–65	2–9	SIU Arena (4,328); Carbondale, IL
12/17/2014*; 7:00 pm	at WKU	L 60–75	2–10	E. A. Diddle Arena (2,876); Bowling Green, KY
12/20/2014*; 2:05 pm	Saint Joseph's (IN)	W 76–54	3–10	Emil and Patricia Jones Convocation Center (305); Chicago, IL
12/22/2014*; 7:00 pm	at SIU Edwardsville	L 38–63	3–11	Vadalabene Center (641); Edwardsville, IL
12/29/2014*; 7:05 pm	Omaha	W 69–66	4–11	Emil and Patricia Jones Convocation Center (342); Chicago, IL
12/31/2014*; 12:00 pm, ESPN3	at Green Bay	L 50–54	4–12	Kress Events Center (2,870); Green Bay, WI
01/03/2015*; 6:00 pm	at Bowling Green	L 35–58	4–13	Stroh Center (3,022); Bowling Green, OH
WAC Regular season
01/10/2015; 7:00 pm	at Texas–Pan American	L 59–64	4–14 (0–1)	UTPA Fieldhouse (1,004); Edinburg, TX
01/17/2015; 2:00 pm	at UMKC	L 62–64	4–15 (0–2)	Municipal Auditorium (1,107); Kansas City, MO
01/22/2015; 7:05 pm, ASN	Seattle	L 67–75	4–16 (0–3)	Emil and Patricia Jones Convocation Center (257); Chicago, IL
01/24/2015; 2:05 pm	Cal State Bakersfield	L 41–57	4–17 (0–4)	Emil and Patricia Jones Convocation Center (517); Chicago, IL
01/29/2015; 8:05 pm	at Utah Valley	L 62–78	4–18 (0–5)	UCCU Center (2,124); Orem, UT
01/31/2015; 8:00 pm	at Grand Canyon	W 56–55	5–18 (1–5)	GCU Arena (5,302); Phoenix, AZ
02/05/2015; 7:05 pm	New Mexico State	L 61–69 ^{OT}	5–19 (1–6)	Emil and Patricia Jones Convocation Center (528); Chicago, IL
02/07/2015; 2:05 pm	Texas–Pan American	W 78–73	6–19 (2–6)	Emil and Patricia Jones Convocation Center (509); Chicago, IL
02/14/2015; 2:05 pm, ESPN3	UMKC	L 50–61	6–20 (2–7)	Emil and Patricia Jones Convocation Center (516); Chicago, IL
02/19/2015; 9:00 pm	at Cal State Bakersfield	L 51–64	6–21 (2–8)	Icardo Center (915); Bakersfield, CA
02/21/2015; 9:00 pm	at Seattle	L 31–57	6–22 (2–9)	KeyArena (1,918); Seattle, WA
02/26/2015; 7:05 pm	Grand Canyon	W 74–70	7–22 (3–9)	Emil and Patricia Jones Convocation Center (568); Chicago, IL
02/28/2015; 2:05 pm	Utah Valley	W 65–44	8–22 (4–9)	Emil and Patricia Jones Convocation Center (631); Chicago, IL
03/07/2015; 8:00 pm, ESPN3	at New Mexico State	L 57–61	8–23 (4–10)	Pan American Center (12,572); Las Cruces, NM
WAC tournament
03/12/2015; 9:00 pm	vs. Seattle; Quarterfinals	L 45–49	8–24	Orleans Arena (1,060); Paradise, NV
*Non-conference game. ^{#}Rankings from AP Poll. (#) Tournament seedings in parentheses. All times are in Central.
