= 2014–15 Utah Valley Wolverines men's basketball team =

American college basketball season

2014–15 Utah Valley Wolverines men's basketball
- Conference: Western Athletic Conference
- Record: 11–19 (5–9 WAC)
- Head coach: Dick Hunsaker (13th season)
- Assistant coaches: Curtis Condie; Terry Parker; Chris Sparks
- Home arena: UCCU Center

2014–15 WAC men's basketball standings
	Conf.				Overall
Team	W		L	PCT	W		L	PCT
New Mexico State †	13	–	1	.929	23	–	11	.676
Grand Canyon *	8	–	6	.571	17	–	15	.531
UMKC	8	–	6	.571	14	–	19	.424
Seattle	7	–	7	.500	18	–	16	.529
Cal State Bakersfield	7	–	7	.500	14	–	19	.424
Utah Valley	5	–	9	.357	11	–	19	.367
Chicago State	4	–	10	.286	8	–	24	.250
Texas–Pan American	4	–	10	.286	10	–	21	.323
† 2015 WAC tournament winner * ineligible due to transition from NCAA Division II.

The 2014–15 Utah Valley Wolverines men's basketball team represented Utah Valley University in the 2014–15 NCAA Division I men's basketball season. Dick Hunsaker was in his thirteenth season as the UVU head coach. The Wolverines played their home games at the UCCU Center as members of the Western Athletic Conference. They finished the season 11–19, 5–9 in WAC play to finish in sixth place. They lost in the quarterfinals of the WAC tournament to Cal State Bakersfield.

On March 8, head coach Dick Hunsaker announced he would be stepping down at the end of the season.

== Previous season ==
The Wolverines finished the season 20–12, 13–3 in WAC play to win the WAC regular season championship. They advanced to the semifinals of the WAC tournament where they lost to Idaho. As a regular season conference champion who failed to win their conference tournament, they received an automatic bid to the National Invitation Tournament where they lost in the first round to California.

== Roster ==
2014–15 Utah Valley Wolverines men's basketball team
Players
Coaches

Pos.	#	Name	Height	Weight	Year	Previous school	Hometown
G	3	Donte Williams	6 ft 4 in (1.93 m)	—	Jr	George Washington; LA Pierce College	Philadelphia, PA
G	4	Hayes Garrity	6 ft 1 in (1.85 m)	—	Jr	Westview; Big Bend CC	Beaverton, OR
G	5	Jaden Jackson	6 ft 1 in (1.85 m)	—	Jr	West Jordan; Salt Lake CC	Salt Lake City, UT
F	11	Eli Robison	6 ft 5 in (1.96 m)	—	RS So	Timpview	Provo, UT
G	14	Cory Cardwell	6 ft 2 in (1.88 m)	—	Jr	Riverton	Riverton, UT
F	15	Mitch Bruneel	6 ft 5 in (1.96 m)	—	RS Sr	Eagle; Utah State	Boise, ID
F	20	Brenden Evans	6 ft 5 in (1.96 m)	—	Sr	Sonora; Modesto JC	Sonora, CA
F	21	Zach Nelson	6 ft 7 in (2.01 m)	—	So	Yuba City	Yuba City, CA
F	22	Chad Ross	6 ft 7 in (2.01 m)	—	Sr	South Gwinnett; Waycross CC	Snellville, GA
G	24	Alex Carr	6 ft 3 in (1.91 m)	—	Jr	South Miner; Wabash Valley	Birmingham, AL
F	33	Dayon Goodman	6 ft 7 in (2.01 m)	—	Fr	Kearns	Salt Lake City, UT
F	42	Darrious Hamilton	6 ft 8 in (2.03 m)	—	Jr	Antonian Prep; Arizona Western	San Antonio, TX
F	45	Boston Gubler	6 ft 8 in (2.03 m)	—	Fr	Hurricane	La Verkin, UT
C	50	Leland Miller	6 ft 10 in (2.08 m)	—	Jr	Snow Canyon; USU-Eastern	Hurricane, UT

Head coach

- Dick Hunsaker (Weber State)

Assistant coach(es)

- Curtis Condie (Utah State)
- Terry Parker (Louisiana Tech)

Legend

- (C) Team captain
- (S) Suspended
- (I) Ineligible
- (W) Walk-on
- Injured
- Current redshirt

== Radio broadcasts and streams ==
All Wolverines games will air on KOVO, part of The Zone family of networks. Games will be streamed online through The Zone's webpage as well as at Utah Valley's Stretch Internet feed.

== Schedule and results ==
Date time, TV	Opponent	Result	Record	Site (attendance) city, state
Exhibition
11/08/2014*; 7:05 pm	Colorado Mesa	W 70–62		UCCU Center (N/A); Orem, UT
Regular season
11/14/2014*; 7:05 pm, UVUtv	South Dakota	W 60–52	1–0	UCCU Center (2,302); Orem, UT
11/17/2014*; 6:05 pm, Watch Big Sky	at Eastern Washington	L 50–75	1–1	Reese Court (1,155); Cheney, WA
11/22/2014*; 7:00 pm, Watch Big SKy	at Southern Utah; Old Oquirrh Bucket	W 85–75	2–1	Centrum Arena (N/A); Cedar City, UT
11/26/2014*; 7:00 pm, Watch Big Sky	at Idaho State	W 60–57	3–1	Holt Arena (1,121); Pocatello, ID
11/29/2014*; 8:00 pm, BigWest.tv	at UC Davis	L 43–64	3–2	The Pavilion (1,240); Davis, CA
12/01/2014*; 8:05 pm, Watch Big Sky	at Sacramento State	L 56–65	3–3	Colberg Court (383); Sacramento, CA
12/06/2014*; 7:00 pm, Watch Big Sky	at Montana State	L 60–68	3–4	Worthington Arena (1,527); Bozeman, MT
12/09/2014*; 7:00 pm, P12N	at No. 3 Arizona	L 56–87	3–5	McKale Center (14,321); Tucson, AZ
12/13/2014*; 7:05 pm, UVUtv	Utah State; Old Oquirrh Bucket	L 47–50	3–6	UCCU Center (6,121); Orem, UT
12/20/2014*; 7:00 pm, KJZZ	at Weber State; Old Oquirrh Bucket	L 61–73	3–7	Dee Events Center (6,803); Ogden, UT
12/23/2014*; 7:05 pm, WAC Digital	Idaho State	W 51–47	4–7	UCCU Center (1,109); Orem, UT
12/27/2014*; 7:05 pm, WAC Digital	Sacramento State	L 49–74	4–8	UCCU Center (932); Orem, UT
12/30/2014*; 7:05 pm, Youtube	Bristol University	W 83–50	5–8	UCCU Center (655); Orem, UT
01/03/2015*; 1:00 pm, SECN	at Arkansas	L 46–79	5–9	Bud Walton Arena (15,410); Fayetteville, AR
01/10/2015; 7:05 pm, UVUtv	Seattle	W 70–52	6–9 (1–0)	UCCU Center (1,888); Orem, UT
01/15/2015; 7:05 pm, UVUtv	Grand Canyon	L 74–83	6–10 (1–1)	UCCU Center (1,426); Orem, UT
01/22/2015; 6:00 pm, WAC Digital	at Texas–Pan American	W 72–54	7–10 (2–1)	UTPA Fieldhouse (1,737); Edinburg, TX
01/24/2015; 7:00 pm, ASN	at New Mexico State	W 69–44	7–11 (2–2)	Pan American Center (5,878); Las Cruces, NM
01/29/2015; 7:05 pm, UVUtv	Chicago State	W 78–62	8–11 (3–2)	UCCU Center (2,124); Orem, UT
01/31/2015; 7:05 pm, ASN	UMKC	L 59–66	8–12 (3–3)	UCCU Center (2,670); Orem, UT
02/05/2015; 8:00 pm, WAC Digital	at Cal State Bakersfield	L 69–72	8–13 (3–4)	Icardo Center (1,060); Bakersfield, CA
02/07/2015; 8:00 pm, WAC Digital	at Seattle	L 33–53	8–14 (3–5)	KeyArena (2,563); Seattle, WA
02/09/2015*; 7:05 pm, Youtube	St. Katherine College	W 77–55	9–14	UCCU Center (1,117); Orem, UT
02/14/2015; 7:00 pm, WAC Digital	at Grand Canyon	L 57–83	9–15 (3–6)	GCU Arena (6,116); Phoenix, AZ
02/19/2015; 7:05 pm, UVUtv	New Mexico State	L 38–51	9–16 (3–7)	UCCU Center (2,749); Orem, UT
02/21/2015; 7:05 pm, UVUtv	Texas–Pan American	L 49–72	10–16 (4–7)	UCCU Center (1,715); Orem, UT
02/26/2015; 6:05 pm, KSMO	at UMKC	L 50–69	10–17 (4–8)	Municipal Auditorium (1,204); Kansas City, MO
02/28/2015; 1:05 pm, CSU-TV	at Chicago State	L 44–65	10–18 (4–9)	Emil and Patricia Jones Convocation Center (631); Chicago, IL
03/07/2015; 7:05 pm, UVUtv	Cal State Bakersfield	L 69–74	11–18 (5–9)	UCCU Center (2,309); Orem, UT
WAC tournament
03/12/2015; 3:00 pm, WAC Digital	vs. Cal State Bakersfield; Quarterfinals	L 40–55	11–19	Orleans Arena (1,060); Paradise, NV
*Non-conference game. ^{#}Rankings from AP Poll. (#) Tournament seedings in parentheses. All times are in Mountain Time.
