= 2014–15 Arizona Wildcats men's basketball team =

American college basketball season

2014–15 Arizona Wildcats men's basketball

Pac-12 regular season & tournament champions Maui Invitational champions

NCAA tournament, Elite Eight
- Conference: Pac-12 Conference

Ranking
- Coaches: No. 4
- AP: No. 5
- Record: 34–4 (16–2 Pac-12)
- Head coach: Sean Miller (6th season)
- Assistant coaches: Joe Pasternack; Emanuel Richardson; Damon Stoudamire
- Home arena: McKale Center

2014–15 Pac-12 Conference men's basketball standings
	Conf.				Overall
Team	W		L	PCT	W		L	PCT
No. 5 Arizona †	16	–	2	.889	34	–	4	.895
No. 25 Oregon	13	–	5	.722	26	–	10	.722
No. 19 Utah	13	–	5	.722	26	–	9	.743
UCLA	11	–	7	.611	22	–	14	.611
Stanford	9	–	9	.500	24	–	13	.649
Arizona State	9	–	9	.500	18	–	16	.529
Oregon State	8	–	10	.444	17	–	14	.548
California	7	–	11	.389	18	–	15	.545
Colorado	7	–	11	.389	16	–	18	.471
Washington State	7	–	11	.389	13	–	18	.419
Washington	5	–	13	.278	16	–	15	.516
USC	3	–	15	.167	12	–	20	.375
† Pac-12 Tournament winner Rankings from AP poll

The 2014–15 Arizona Wildcats men's basketball team represented the University of Arizona during the 2014–15 NCAA Division I men's basketball season. The team was led by sixth-year head coach Sean Miller and played home games at the McKale Center in Tucson, Arizona as a member of the Pac-12 Conference. They finished the season 34–4, 16–2 in Pac-12 play to win their second straight Pac-12 regular season championship title for 14th time. In the Pac-12 Tournament, the Wildcats defeated 8-seed California; 73–51 in the quarterfinal game, 4-seed UCLA; 70–64 in the semifinal game, and 2-seed Oregon; 80–52 in the championship game. The Wildcats won their first Pac-12 Tournament title for the fifth time since 2002. As the #2 seed in the West Region NCAA tournament, The Arizona Wildcats defeated the #15 seed Texas Southern; 93–72 in the round of 64, #10 seed Ohio State; 73–58 in the round of 32, 6-seed Xavier; 68–60 in the Sweet 16, advancing to the Elite 8 for second straight year, losing to 1-seed Wisconsin (the rematch from the NCAA tournament's Elite 8 loss in 1-point overtime last season); 85–78.

== Previous season ==
The 2013–14 Arizona Wildcats team finished the season with an overall record of 33–5, and 15–3 in the Pac-12 to win their 13th Pac-12 regular season championship. In the Pac-12 tournament the Wildcats defeated Utah and Colorado to advanced to the Pac-12 Championship Game, where they lost to UCLA. The team received an at-large bid to the NCAA tournament as a 1–seed in the West Region, where they defeated 16-seed Weber State, 8-seed Gonzaga, and 4-seed San Diego State to advance to the Elite Eight, where they lost to 2-seed Wisconsin in overtime.

== Off Season ==
=== Departures ===
Name	Number	Pos.	Height	Weight	Year	Hometown	Notes
Jordin Mayes	20	G	6’3”	190	Senior	Los Angeles, California	Graduated
Nick Johnson	13	G	6'3"	200	Junior	Gilbert, Arizona	Declared for 2014 NBA draft.
Zach Peters	33	PF	6'10"	240	RS Freshman	Plano, Texas	Retired from playing basketball due to concussion issues.
Aaron Gordon	11	F	6'9"	225	Freshman	San Jose, California	Declared for 2014 NBA draft.
Eric Conklin	54	PF	6'6"	235	Freshman	Scottsdale, Arizona	Elected to transfer.

=== Incoming transfers ===
Name	Number	Pos.	Height	Weight	Year	Hometown	Notes
Ryan Anderson	12	PF	6’9”	216	Senior	Lakewood, CA	Elected to forgo playing his senior season at Boston College to transfer to Arizona. Anderson will redshirt for the 2014–15 season, under NCAA transfer rules. Will have one year of eligibility for the 2015–16 season.
Kadeem Allen	20	G	6'3"	180	Junior	Wilmington, NC	National JC Player of the Year, at Hutchinson Community College in Kansas. Allen will redshirt for the 2014–15 season, and will have two years of eligibility starting for the 2015–16 season.

=== 2014 Recruiting Class ===
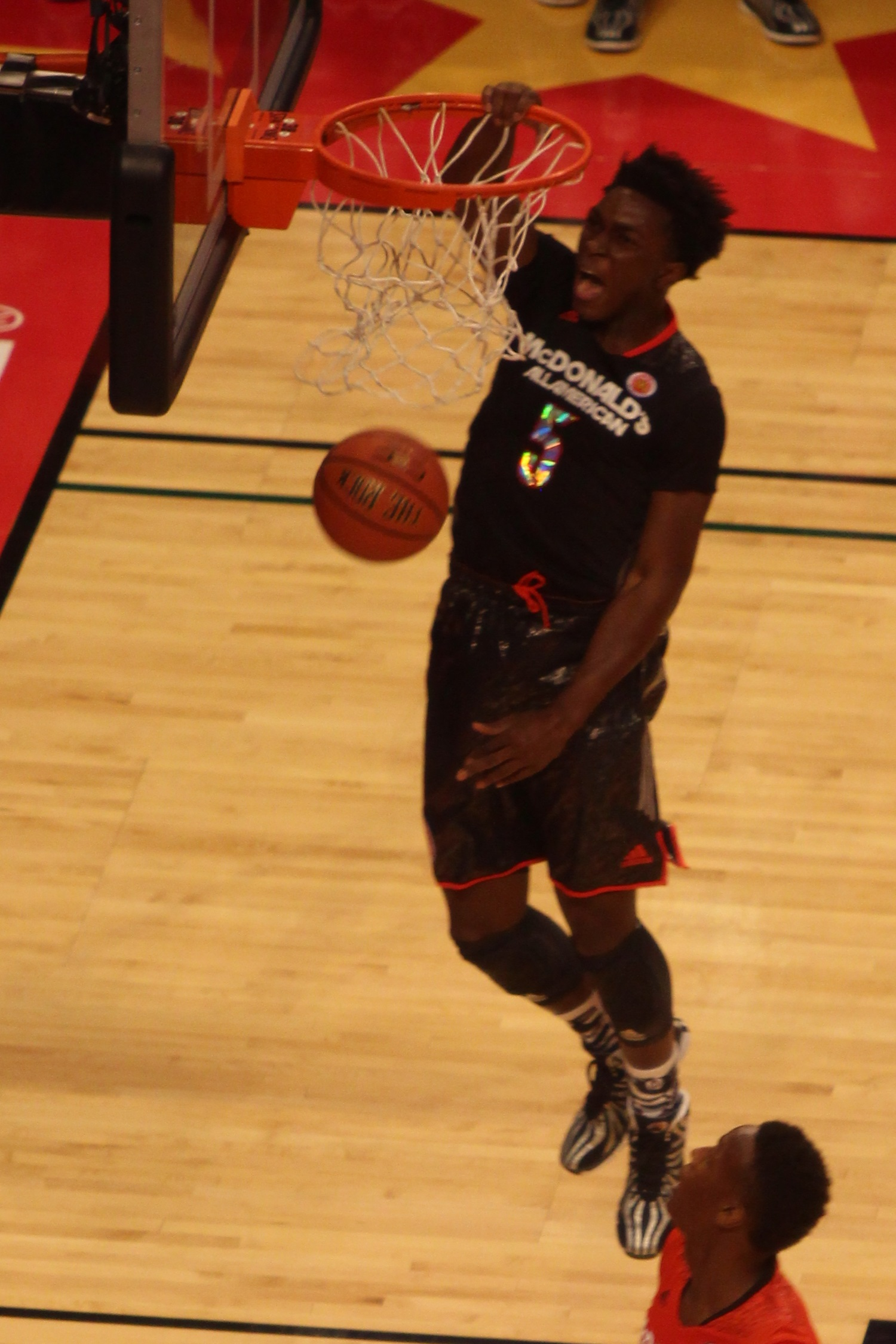
Stanley Johnson in the 2014 McDonald's All-American Boys Game

College recruiting information
Name	Hometown	School	Height	Weight	Commit date
Parker Jackson-Cartwright; PG	Los Angeles, CA	Loyola H.S.	5 ft 8 in (1.73 m)	150 lb (68 kg)	Feb 24, 2013
Parker Jackson-Cartwright; PG	Recruit ratings: Scout: Rivals: 247Sports: ESPN:				
Craig Victor II; F	New Orleans, LA	Findlay Prep	6 ft 7 in (2.01 m)	210 lb (95 kg)	Aug 17, 2013
Craig Victor II; F	Recruit ratings: Scout: Rivals: 247Sports: ESPN:				
Kadeem Allen; G	Wilmington, NC	Hutchinson C.C.	6 ft 3 in (1.91 m)	180 lb (82 kg)	Oct 28, 2013
Kadeem Allen; G	Recruit ratings: Scout: Rivals: 247Sports: ESPN:				
Stanley Johnson; F/G	Fullerton, CA	Mater Dei H.S	6 ft 6 in (1.98 m)	225 lb (102 kg)	Nov 15, 2013
Stanley Johnson; F/G	Recruit ratings: Scout: Rivals: 247Sports: ESPN:				
Dušan Ristić; C	Novi Sad, SRB	Sunrise Christian Academy	7 ft 0 in (2.13 m)	240 lb (110 kg)	Mar 8, 2014
Dušan Ristić; C	Recruit ratings: Scout: Rivals: 247Sports: ESPN:				
Overall recruit ranking: Scout: #3 Rivals: #4 ESPN: #6
Note: In many cases, Scout, Rivals, 247Sports, On3, and ESPN may conflict in their listings of height and weight.; In these cases, the average was taken. ESPN grades are on a 100-point scale.; Sources: "Arizona 2014 Basketball Commitments". Rivals.; "2014 Arizona Basketball Commits". Scout.; "2014 Arizona Wildcats Recruiting Class". ESPN.; "Scout.com Team Recruiting Rankings". Scout.; "2014 Team Ranking". Rivals.

== Personnel ==
=== Roster ===
2014–15 Arizona Wildcats men's basketball team
Players
Coaches

Pos.	#	Name	Height	Weight	Year	Previous school	Hometown
G	0	Parker Jackson-Cartwright	5 ft 10 in (1.78 m)	160 lb (73 kg)	Fr	Sierra Canyon School	Los Angeles, California
G	1	Gabe York	6 ft 3 in (1.91 m)	185 lb (84 kg)	Jr	Orange Lutheran HS	West Covina, California
G	4	T. J. McConnell	6 ft 1 in (1.85 m)	195 lb (88 kg)	RS Sr	Chartiers Valley HS/Duquesne	Pittsburgh, Pennsylvania
G/F	5	Stanley Johnson	6 ft 7 in (2.01 m)	245 lb (111 kg)	Fr	Mater Dei HS	Fullerton, California
F	12	Ryan Anderson (redshirt)	6 ft 9 in (2.06 m)	230 lb (104 kg)	Sr	Long Beach Poly HS/Boston College	Lakewood, California
C	14	Dušan Ristić	7 ft 0 in (2.13 m)	245 lb (111 kg)	Fr	Sunrise Christian Academy	Novi Sad, Serbia
G	20	Kadeem Allen (redshirt)	6 ft 3 in (1.91 m)	195 lb (88 kg)	Jr	New Hanover HS/Hutchinson C.C.	Wilmington, North Carolina
F	21	Brandon Ashley	6 ft 9 in (2.06 m)	230 lb (104 kg)	Jr	Findlay Prep	San Francisco, California
F	23	Rondae Hollis-Jefferson	6 ft 7 in (2.01 m)	220 lb (100 kg)	So	Chester HS	Chester, Pennsylvania
G	24	Elliott Pitts	6 ft 5 in (1.96 m)	185 lb (84 kg)	So	De La Salle HS	Dublin, California
F	31	Matt Korcheck	6 ft 10 in (2.08 m)	235 lb (107 kg)	RS Sr	Sabino HS/Cochise College	Tucson, Arizona
C	35	Kaleb Tarczewski	7 ft 0 in (2.13 m)	245 lb (111 kg)	Jr	St. Mark's School	Claremont, New Hampshire
G	44	Trey Mason (W)	6 ft 2 in (1.88 m)	180 lb (82 kg)	So	Loyola HS	Los Angeles, California
G	50	Jacob Hazzard (W)	6 ft 0 in (1.83 m)	160 lb (73 kg)	Jr	Loyola HS	Los Angeles, California
F	55	Drew Mellon (W)	6 ft 6 in (1.98 m)	205 lb (93 kg)	Sr	Mater Dei HS	Santa Ana, California

Head coach

- Sean Miller (Pittsburgh)

Assistant coach(es)

- Joe Pasternack (Indiana)
- Emanuel Richardson (Pitt–Johnstown)
- Damon Stoudamire (Arizona)

Legend

- (C) Team captain
- (S) Suspended
- (I) Ineligible
- (W) Walk-on
- Injured
- Current redshirt

Roster
Last update: 01/06/2015

- On January 6, 2015, Freshman forward Craig Victor II announced he would be transferring. Three days later, it was announced Victor would be transferring to LSU.

==== Depth chart ====
Pos.	Starting 5	Bench 1	Bench 2	Bench 3
C	Kaleb Tarczewski	Dušan Ristić
PF	Brandon Ashley	Matt Korcheck		Ryan Anderson
SF	Rondae Hollis-Jefferson	Elliott Pitts	Drew Mellon
SG	Stanley Johnson	Gabe York	Trey Mason
PG	T. J. McConnell	Parker Jackson-Cartwright	Jacob Hazzard	Kadeem Allen

=== Coaching staff ===
Name	Position	Year at Arizona	Alma Mater (year)
Sean Miller	Head Coach	6th	Pittsburgh (1992)
Joe Pasternack	Associate head coach	4th	Indiana (1999)
Emanuel Richardson	Assistant Coach	6th	Pittsburgh-Johnstown (1998)
Damon Stoudamire	Assistant Coach	2nd	Arizona (1995)
Ryan Reynolds	Director of Basketball Operations	6th	Xavier (2007)
Ben Tucker	Assistant Director of Basketball Operations	1st	Arizona (2010)

== Schedule ==
The team's non-conference schedule will include road games at UNLV and UTEP, home games against Mount St. Mary's, UC Irvine, Oakland, Gardner-Webb, Michigan, Gonzaga, Utah Valley and Cal State Northridge (Maui Invitational opening game) and three neutral-site games as part of the 2014 Maui Invitational Tournament. In conference play, the team will face neither the Washington teams at home nor the Los Angeles teams on the road.

Date time, TV	Rank^{#}	Opponent^{#}	Result	Record	High points	High rebounds	High assists	Site (attendance) city, state
Exhibition
11/09/2014*; 4:00 pm, P12N	No. 2	Cal Poly Pomona	W 67–51	–	12 – Tied	7 – Tied	11 – McConnell	McKale Center (10,000); Tucson, AZ
Non-conference regular season
11/14/2014*; 6:00 pm, P12N	No. 2	Mount St. Mary's	W 78–55	1–0	21 – Ashley	10 – Tarczewski	7 – McConnell	McKale Center (14,655); Tucson, AZ
11/16/2014*; 6:00 pm, P12N	No. 2	Cal State Northridge; Maui Invitational Opening Round	W 86–68	2–0	17 – Johnson	8 – Hollis-Jefferson	8 – McConnell	McKale Center (14,655); Tucson, AZ
11/19/2014*; 7:00 pm, P12N	No. 2	UC Irvine	W 71–54	3–0	19 – Hollis-Jefferson	10 – Johnson	4 – McConnell	McKale Center (14,655); Tucson, AZ
11/24/2014*; 3:00 pm, ESPN2	No. 3	vs. Missouri; Maui Invitational Quarterfinals	W 72–53	4–0	15 – Tied	8 – Tarczewski	9 – McConnell	Lahaina Civic Center (2,400); Maui, HI
11/25/2014*; 5:30 pm, ESPN	No. 3	vs. Kansas State; Maui Invitational Semifinals	W 72–68	5–0	18 – Tarczewski	8 – Hollis-Jefferson	6 – McConnell	Lahaina Civic Center (2,400); Maui, HI
11/26/2014*; 8:00 pm, ESPN	No. 3	vs. No. 15 San Diego State; Maui Invitational Championship	W 61–59	6–0	18 – Johnson	9 – Johnson	3 – McConnell	Lahaina Civic Center (2,400); Maui, HI
12/02/2014*; 7:00 pm, P12N	No. 3	Gardner–Webb	W 91–65	7–0	18 – Tied	8 – Tied	8 – McConnell	McKale Center (14,150); Tucson, AZ
12/06/2014*; 3:15 pm, ESPN	No. 3	No. 9 Gonzaga	W 66–63 ^{OT}	8–0	14 – Ashley	7 – Tarczewski	3 – Jackson-Cartwright	McKale Center (14,655); Tucson, AZ
12/09/2014*; 7:00 pm, P12N	No. 3	Utah Valley	W 87–56	9–0	14 – Johnson	10 – Hollis-Jefferson	3 – Tied	McKale Center (14,321); Tucson, AZ
12/13/2014*; 3:15 pm, ESPN	No. 3	Michigan	W 80–53	10–0	17 – Johnson	7 – Tied	7 – McConnell	McKale Center (14,655); Tucson, AZ
12/16/2014*; 7:00 pm, P12N	No. 3	Oakland	W 101–64	11–0	18 – Johnson	8 – Ashley	10 – McConnell	McKale Center (14,405); Tucson, AZ
12/19/2014*; 9:00 pm, FS1	No. 3	at UTEP	W 60–55	12–0	17 – Johnson	7 – McConnell	8 – McConnell	Don Haskins Center (12,000); El Paso, TX
12/23/2014*; 8:00 pm, CBSSN	No. 3	at UNLV	L 67–71	12–1	14 – McConnell	13 – Johnson	7 – McConnell	Thomas & Mack Center (15,387); Paradise, NV
Pac-12 regular season
01/04/2015; 5:00 pm, FS1	No. 8	Arizona State; Rivalry	W 73–49	13–1 (1–0)	13 – Tied	8 – Hollis-Jefferson	4 – Hollis-Jefferson	McKale Center (14,655); Tucson, AZ
01/08/2015; 8:00 pm, P12N	No. 7	at Oregon	W 80–62	14–1 (2–0)	21 – McConnell	10 – Tarczewski	3 – Tied	Matthew Knight Arena (8,829); Eugene, OR
01/11/2015; 8:00 pm, FS1	No. 7	at Oregon State	L 56–58	14–2 (2–1)	14 – Hollis-Jefferson	6 – Tied	6 – McConnell	Gill Coliseum (6,191); Corvallis, OR
01/15/2015; 7:00 pm, ESPN	No. 10	Colorado	W 68–54	15–2 (3–1)	22 – Johnson	11 – Ashley	6 – McConnell	McKale Center (14,655); Tucson, AZ
01/17/2015; 5:00 pm, P12N	No. 10	No. 8 Utah	W 69–51	16–2 (4–1)	18 – Johnson	10 – Johnson	6 – McConnell	McKale Center (14,655); Tucson, AZ
01/22/2015; 7:00 pm, ESPN2	No. 7	at Stanford	W 89–82	17–2 (5–1)	19 – Johnson	7 – Johnson	5 – McConnell	Maples Pavilion (6,943); Stanford, CA
01/24/2015; 8:30 pm, P12N	No. 7	at California	W 73–50	18–2 (6–1)	18 – Johnson	9 – Johnson	6 – McConnell	Haas Pavilion (11,877); Berkeley, CA
01/28/2015; 8:00 pm, P12N	No. 6	Oregon	W 90–56	19–2 (7–1)	16 – York	7 – Hollis-Jefferson	6 – McConnell	McKale Center (14,655); Tucson, AZ
01/30/2015; 6:00 pm, P12N	No. 6	Oregon State	W 57–34	20–2 (8–1)	12 – Ashley	9 – Johnson	6 – McConnell	McKale Center (14,655); Tucson, AZ
02/07/2015; 2:30 pm, FOX	No. 6	at Arizona State; Rivalry	L 78–81	20–3 (8–2)	25 – McConnell	9 – Tarczewski	4 – McConnell	Wells Fargo Arena (10,876); Tempe, AZ
02/13/2015; 7:00 pm, ESPN	No. 7	at Washington	W 86–62	21–3 (9–2)	20 – Johnson	9 – Hollis-Jefferson	10 – McConnell	Alaska Airlines Arena (6,999); Seattle, WA
02/15/2015; 4:30 pm, FS1	No. 7	at Washington State	W 86–59	22–3 (10–2)	17 – Tied	10 – Hollis-Jefferson	8 – McConnell	Beasley Coliseum (5,331); Pullman, WA
02/19/2015; 7:00 pm, P12N	No. 7	USC	W 87–57	23–3 (11–2)	15 – Tarczewski	9 – Tarczewski	7 – McConnell	McKale Center (14,655); Tucson, AZ
02/21/2015; 7:00 pm, ESPN	No. 7	UCLA; Rivalry; ESPN College GameDay	W 57–47	24–3 (12–2)	13 – York	10 – Johnson	5 – McConnell	McKale Center (14,655); Tucson, AZ
02/26/2015; 7:00 pm, ESPN	No. 7	at Colorado	W 82–54	25–3 (13–2)	15 – Johnson	8 – Hollis-Jefferson	6 – McConnell	Coors Events Center (11,120); Boulder, CO
02/28/2015; 7:00 pm, ESPN	No. 7	at No. 13 Utah	W 63–57	26–3 (14–2)	12 – Tarczewski	11 – Johnson	5 – McConnell	Jon M. Huntsman Center (15,165); Salt Lake City, UT
03/05/2015; 7:00 pm, ESPN	No. 5	California	W 99–60	27–3 (15–2)	21 – Ashley	8 – Tarczewski	11 – McConnell	McKale Center (14,655); Tucson, AZ
03/07/2015; 2:00 pm, CBS	No. 5	Stanford	W 91–69	28–3 (16–2)	15 – Ashley	9 – Ashley	11 – McConnell	McKale Center (14,655); Tucson, AZ
Pac-12 Tournament
03/12/2015; 1:00 pm, P12N	No. 5	vs. California; Quarterfinals	W 73–51	29–3	19 – Johnson	7 – Tied	6 – McConnell	MGM Grand Garden Arena (12,916); Paradise, NV
03/13/2015; 7:00 pm, P12N	No. 5	vs. UCLA; Semifinals	W 70–64	30–3	24 – Ashley	12 – Hollis-Jefferson	11 – McConnell	MGM Grand Garden Arena (12,916); Paradise, NV
03/14/2015; 9:00 pm, ESPN	No. 5	vs. Oregon; Championship	W 80–52	31–3	20 – Ashley	9 – Hollis-Jefferson	6 – McConnell	MGM Grand Garden Arena (12,916); Paradise, NV
NCAA tournament
03/19/2015*; 12:10 pm, TNT	(2 W) No. 5	vs. (15 W) Texas Southern; First round	W 93–72	32–3	23 – Hollis-Jefferson	10 – Hollis-Jefferson	4 – McConnell	Moda Center (13,616); Portland, OR
03/21/2015*; 3:15 pm, CBS	(2 W) No. 5	vs. (10 W) Ohio State; Second round	W 73–58	33–3	19 – Tied	10 – Tied	6 – McConnell	Moda Center (17,370); Portland, OR
03/26/2015*; 8:17 pm, TBS	(2 W) No. 5	vs. (6 W) Xavier; Sweet Sixteen	W 68–60	34–3	17 – McConnell	12 – Tarczewski	5 – McConnell	Staples Center (18,809); Los Angeles, CA
03/28/2015*; 4:09 pm, TBS	(2 W) No. 5	vs. (1 W) No. 3 Wisconsin; Elite Eight	L 78–85	34–4	17 – Tied	8 – Hollis-Jefferson	5 – McConnell	Staples Center (19,125); Los Angeles, CA
*Non-conference game. ^{#}Rankings from AP Poll. (#) Tournament seedings in parentheses. W=West Region. All times are in Mountain Time.

== Ranking movement ==
Legend: ██ Increase in ranking. ██ Decrease in ranking.
Poll	Pre	Wk 2	Wk 3	Wk 4	Wk 5	Wk 6	Wk 7	Wk 8	Wk 9	Wk 10	Wk 11	Wk 12	Wk 13	Wk 14	Wk 15	Wk 16	Wk 17	Wk 18	Post	Final
AP	2	2	3	3	3	3	3	8	7	10	7	6	6	7	7	7	5	5	5	N/A
Coaches	2	2	4	3	3	3	3	7	6	9	7	6	6	7	7	7	6	6	4	4

== Player statistics ==
- As of March 28, 2015

Player	GP	GS	MPG	FGM-FGA	3PM-3PA	FTM-FTA	RPG	APG	SPG	BPG	PPG
Brandon Ashley	38	38	27.8	166–323	12–36	121–172	5.2	0.6	0.6	0.6	12.2
Jacob Hazzard	17	0	1.6	1–10	0–6	0–0	0	0.05	0	0	0.1
Rondae Hollis-Jefferson	38	25	28.7	138–275	6–29	145–205	6.8	1.5	1.1	0.8	11.2
Parker Jackson–Cartwright	34	0	9.6	34–75	9–23	22–34	1.4	1.8	0.3	0.0	2.9
Stanley Johnson	38	37	28.4	174–390	43–116	132–178	6.5	1.6	1.5	0.4	13.8
Matt Korcheck	21	1	3.7	10–14	0–0	6–6	0.8	0.1	0.05	0.3	1.2
Trey Mason	9	0	1.3	1–3	1–1	0–0	0.1	0	0	0	0.3
T. J. McConnell	38	38	30.5	156–313	25–78	58–70	3.8	6.3	2.2	0.07	10.4
Drew Mellon	12	0	1.9	0–7	0–3	0–0	0.3	0.2	0	0	0
Elliott Pitts	38	1	14.9	43–109	27–74	19–24	1.0	0.4	0.3	0.05	3.5
Dušan Ristić	36	0	8.6	48–78	4–5	21–41	2.1	0.05	0.05	0.2	3.4
Kaleb Tarczewski	38	37	26.0	123–215	0–0	107–153	5.2	0.3	0.4	0.6	9.3
Gabe York	37	13	23.1	107–243	66–165	60–74	2.1	1.2	0.6	0.3	9.2

== Awards ==
Stanley Johnson

- All-Freshman Team USBWA (2015)
- District IX All-District Team USBWA (2015)
- Pac-12 Freshman Player of the Year (2015)
- Pac-12 All-Freshman Team (2015)
- Pac-12 Tournament All-Tournament Team (2015)
- First-team All-Pac-12 (2015)
- 2014 Maui Invitational MVP, All-Tournament Team
- 2x Pac-12 Player of the Week (December 1, 2014, January 19, 2015)
- NCAA National Player of the Week (January 19, 2015)
- Wayman Tisdale National Freshmen of the Week (January 18, 2015)
- Wayman Tisdale National Freshmen of the Year Award Finalist
- Julius Erving Small Forward of the Year Award Finalist
- Julius Erving Small Forward of the Year (2015)
- Third-team USA Today All-American

Rondae Hollis-Jefferson

- NCAA Tournament West Regional All-Tournament Team (2015)
- Pac-12 Tournament All-Tournament Team (2015)
- 2014 Maui Invitational All-Tournament Team
- Pac-12 Player of the Week (February 16, 2015)
- Pac-12 All-Defensive Team (2015)
- First-team All-Pac-12 (2015)

T. J. McConnell

- NCAA Tournament West Region All-Tournament Team (2015)
- Pac-12 Tournament All-Tournament Team (2015)
- District IX All-District Team USBWA (2015)
- NCAA National Player of the Week (March 9, 2015)
- First-team All-Pac-12 (2015)
- Pac-12 All-Defensive Team (2015)
- Bob Cousy Point Guard of the Year Award Finalist

Brandon Ashley

- Pac-12 Tournament MVP (2015)
- All-Pac-12 Honorable Mention (2015)

== See also ==
- 2014–15 Arizona Wildcats women's basketball team
