= 2015 WAC men's basketball tournament =

2015 Western Athletic Conference men's basketball tournament
- Classification: Division I
- Season: 2014–15
- Teams: 7
- Site: Orleans Arena; Paradise, Nevada
- Champions: New Mexico State (6th title)
- Winning coach: Marvin Menzies (5th title)
- Attendance: 4,546
- Television: ESPNU

2014–15 WAC men's basketball standings
	Conf.				Overall
Team	W		L	PCT	W		L	PCT
New Mexico State †	13	–	1	.929	23	–	11	.676
Grand Canyon *	8	–	6	.571	17	–	15	.531
UMKC	8	–	6	.571	14	–	19	.424
Seattle	7	–	7	.500	18	–	16	.529
Cal State Bakersfield	7	–	7	.500	14	–	19	.424
Utah Valley	5	–	9	.357	11	–	19	.367
Chicago State	4	–	10	.286	8	–	24	.250
Texas–Pan American	4	–	10	.286	10	–	21	.323
† 2015 WAC tournament winner * ineligible due to transition from NCAA Division II.

The 2015 WAC men's basketball tournament was a postseason men's basketball tournament for the Western Athletic Conference, held from March 12–14, 2015 at the Orleans Arena in Paradise, Nevada. The tournament was won by New Mexico State, who defeated Seattle in the final.

== Format ==
Grand Canyon did not compete in the 2015 men's basketball tournament for the second time. As a D2 to D1 transitioning school, they are ineligible to compete in the NCAA tournament or the NIT (which is also operated by the NCAA) until the 2018 season, so they could not win the conference tournament as the winner received an automatic bid to the NCAA Tournament. However Grand Canyon was eligible to win the regular season title and was eligible to compete in the CIT or the CBI. (The Antelopes did in fact receive a bid to, and participated in, the 2015 CIT.)

== Seeds ==
Seed	School	Conference	Overall	Tiebreaker
1	New Mexico State	13–1	21–10	
2	UMKC	8–6	13–18	
3	Seattle	7–7	14–14	1–1 vs. NMSU
4	CSU–Bakersfield	7–7	13–18	0–2 vs. NMSU
5	Utah Valley	5–9	11–18	
6	Chicago State	4–10	8–23	2–0 vs. Grand Canyon
7	Texas–Pan American	4–10	10–20	1–1 vs. Grand Canyon

Overall record at the end of regular season

== Schedule ==
Session	Game	Time*	Matchup^{#}
Quarterfinals – Thursday, March 12
1	1	2:30 pm	#4 Cal State Bakersfield vs. #5 Utah Valley
2	2	6:00 pm	#2 UMKC vs. #7 Texas–Pan American
2	3	8:30 pm	#3 Seattle vs. #6 Chicago State
Semifinals – Friday, March 13
3	4	6:00 pm	#1 New Mexico State vs. #4 Cal State Bakersfield
3	5	8:30 pm	#2 UMKC vs. #3 Seattle
Championship – Saturday, March 14
4	6	7:00 pm	#1 New Mexico State vs. #3 Seattle
*Game times in PT. #-Rankings denote tournament seeding.

== Bracket ==
Quarterfinals; Thursday, March 12
4	Cal State Bakersfield	55
5	Utah Valley	40
2	UMKC	70
7	Texas–Pan American	61
3	Seattle	49
6	Chicago State	45

Semifinals; Friday, March 13
1	New Mexico State	57
4	Cal State Bakersfield	52
2	UMKC	63
3	Seattle	69

Championship; Saturday, March 14; ESPNU
1	New Mexico State	80
3	Seattle	61

== See also ==
- 2014-15 NCAA Division I men's basketball season
- WAC men's basketball tournament
