= 2014–15 UMKC Kangaroos men's basketball team =

American college basketball season

2014–15 UMKC Kangaroos men's basketball
- Conference: Western Athletic Conference
- Record: 14–19 (8–6 WAC)
- Head coach: Kareem Richardson (2nd season)
- Associate head coach: Angres Thorpe (2nd season)
- Assistant coaches: Jason Sautter (2nd season); Andre McGee (1st season)
- Home arena: Municipal Auditorium

2014–15 WAC men's basketball standings
	Conf.				Overall
Team	W		L	PCT	W		L	PCT
New Mexico State †	13	–	1	.929	23	–	11	.676
Grand Canyon *	8	–	6	.571	17	–	15	.531
UMKC	8	–	6	.571	14	–	19	.424
Seattle	7	–	7	.500	18	–	16	.529
Cal State Bakersfield	7	–	7	.500	14	–	19	.424
Utah Valley	5	–	9	.357	11	–	19	.367
Chicago State	4	–	10	.286	8	–	24	.250
Texas–Pan American	4	–	10	.286	10	–	21	.323
† 2015 WAC tournament winner * ineligible due to transition from NCAA Division II.

The 2014–15 UMKC Kangaroos men's basketball team represented the University of Missouri–Kansas City during the 2014–15 NCAA Division I men's basketball season. The Kangaroos, led by second year head coach Kareem Richardson, played their home games off-campus at Municipal Auditorium in Kansas City, Missouri as a member of the Western Athletic Conference (WAC).

They finished the season 14–19, 8–6 in WAC play to finish in a tie for second place. They were victorious over the University of Texas–Pan American in the WAC tournament quarterfinal but were defeated by the University of Seattle in the semifinal.

== Previous season ==
The Kangaroos finished the 2013–14 season with a record of 10–20 overall, 7–9 in the WAC to finish in a tie for fifth place.

== Roster ==
2014–15 UMKC Kangaroos men's basketball team
Players
Coaches

Pos.	#	Name	Height	Weight	Year	Previous school	Hometown
F	5	Reese Holliday	6 ft 4 in (1.93 m)	215 lb (98 kg)	RS Sr	Toledo; Sumner	Kansas City, KS
G	13	Frank Williams, Jr.	6 ft 6 in (1.98 m)	175 lb (79 kg)	Sr	Indian Hills CC; Raytown Senior HS	Kansas City, MO
F	22	Shayok Shayok	6 ft 8 in (2.03 m)	220 lb (100 kg)	RS Jr	Bradley; IMG Academy/ Percy L. Julian HS/ St. Patrick's HS	Ottawa, Ontario
G	1	Kevin Franceschi	6 ft 4 in (1.93 m)	190 lb (86 kg)	Jr	Weatherford; Lycée Romain Rolland	Argenteuil, France
C	21	Thaddeus Smith	6 ft 9 in (2.06 m)	245 lb (111 kg)	Jr	Weatherford/ Seward County CC; Ideal Academy	Washington, D. C.
G/F	25	Broderick Newbill	6 ft 5 in (1.96 m)	195 lb (88 kg)	RS So	Fresno State; Hogan Preparatory	Kansas City, MO
G	4	Mason Wedel	6 ft 1 in (1.85 m)	180 lb (82 kg)	RS So	De Soto HS	Shawnee, KS
G	12	Martez Harrison	5 ft 11 in (1.8 m)	190 lb (86 kg)	So	Brewster/ University	Kansas City, MO
F/C	54	Isaac Kreuer	6 ft 10 in (2.08 m)	245 lb (111 kg)	So	Impact/ Metro	Harrisonville, MO
F	35	Juan Ramon Rivas	6 ft 8 in (2.03 m)	215 lb (98 kg)	RS Fr	Olympia HS	Orlando, FL
G/F	23	Darius Austin	6 ft 6 in (1.98 m)	210 lb (95 kg)	Fr	Cahokia HS	Centreville, IL
G	11	Collin Jennings	6 ft 4 in (1.93 m)	175 lb (79 kg)	Fr	Harrah HS	Harrah, OK
G	42	Noah Knight	6 ft 1 in (1.85 m)	195 lb (88 kg)	Fr	Olathe South HS	Olathe KS
G	3	Brandyn Moultrie	6 ft 2 in (1.88 m)	170 lb (77 kg)	Fr	Liberty HS	Liberty, MO
G	2	Deshon Taylor	6 ft 2 in (1.88 m)	165 lb (75 kg)	Fr	John W. North HS	Riverside, CA

Head coach

- Kareem Richardson (Evansville)

Assistant coach(es)

- Angres Thorpe (Saint Leo)
- Jason Sautter (York (Nebraska))
- Andre McGee (Louisville)

Legend

- (C) Team captain
- (S) Suspended
- (I) Ineligible
- (W) Walk-on
- (5Y) Fifth-year Senior
- Injured
- Current redshirt

Roster
Last update: November 3, 2024

== Schedule & Results ==
Date time, TV	Rank^{#}	Opponent^{#}	Result	Record	High points	High rebounds	High assists	Site (attendance) city, state
Exhibition Season
November 8, 2014*; 7:05 PM		Rockhurst	W 83–67		19 – Holliday, Harrison	7 – Holliday	3 – Jennings	Municipal Auditorium (2,357); Kansas City, MO
Non–Conference Regular Season
November 14, 2014*; 8:00 PM, SECN+		at Missouri; EA Sports Maui Invitational [Opening Game]	W 69–61	1–0	26 – Harrison	8 – Newbill	3 – Harrison	Mizzou Arena (7,014); Columbia, MO
November 17, 2014*; 7:00 PM, FSMW		at Kansas State; EA Sports Maui Invitational [Opening Game]	L 73–83	1–1	21 – Harrison	5 – Williams, Jr.	5 – Harrison	Fred Bramlage Coliseum (12,189); Manhattan, KS
November 19, 2014*; 7:05 PM		Missouri S&T	W 90–77	2–1	14 – Newbill	9 – Shayok	11 – Harrison	Municipal Auditorium (1,503); Kansas City, MO
November 22, 2014*; 3:30 PM		at Arkansas–Little Rock; EA Sports Maui Invitational; Mainland Regional [Semifinal]	L 68–73	2–2	15 – Williams, Jr., Harrison	11 – Shayok	3 – Harrison, Taylor	Jack Stephens Center (647); Little Rock, AR
November 23, 2014*; 3:30 PM		vs. Samford; EA Sports Maui Invitational; Mainland Regional [Consolation Final]	L 55–64	2–3	17 – Harrison	9 – Shayok	5 – Harrison	Jack Stephens Center (549); Little Rock, AR
November 26, 2014*; 6:00 PM, ESPN3		at Youngstown State	L 63–66	2–4	20 – Harrison	8 – Holliday, Shayok	3 – Holliday	Beeghly Physical Education Center (1,177); Youngstown, OH
November 29, 2014*; 7:05 PM		William Jewell	W 84–44	3–4	16 – Harrison	5 – Newbill, Knight	5 – Harrison	Municipal Auditorium (1,370); Kansas City, MO
December 3, 2014*; 7:00 PM, ESPN3		at Milwaukee	L 56–65	3–5	14 – Harrison	7 – Holliday, Shayok	3 – Harrison	UWMilwaukee Panther Arena (1,910); Milwaukee, WI
December 6, 2014*; 1:00 PM, KSMO–TV/ESPN3		at South Dakota State	L 61–81	3–6	12 – Harrison	5 – Smith, Austin	2 – Franceschi, Harrison	Frost Arena (1,301); Brookings, SD
December 9, 2014*; 7:00 PM, ESPNU		at No. 14 Iowa State	L 56–73	3–7	14 – Williams, Jr.	6 – Austin	3 – Knight	James H. Hilton Coliseum (13,902); Ames, IA
December 13, 2014*; 2:05 PM, ASN		Omaha	W 79–72	4–7	25 – Harrison	8 – Austin	6 – Harrison	Municipal Auditorium (2,719); Kansas City, MO
December 20, 2014*; 6:05 PM, KSMO–TV/ESPN3		Incarnate Word	L 104–110 ^{3OT}	4–8	17 – Harrison	9 – Smith	5 – Holliday	Municipal Auditorium (1,473); Kansas City, MO
December 22, 2014*; 7:05 PM		Tennessee Tech	L 60–81	4–9	16 – Harrison	4 – Newbill	3 – Harrison	Municipal Auditorium (1,359); Kansas City, MO
December 28, 2014*; 1:05 PM		at Indiana State	W 73–70 ^{2OT}	5–9	34 – Harrison	13 – Austin	8 – Harrison	Hulman Center (3,578); Terre Haute, IN
December 30, 2014*; 6:00 PM		at Canisius	L 55–67	5–10	23 – Harrison	9 – Austin	3 – Austin	Koessler Athletic Center (1,227); Buffalo, NY
January 3, 2015*; 2:30 PM, KSMO–TV		at Miami (Ohio)	L 61–66	5–11	14 – Holliday	12 – Austin	4 – Harrison, Jennings	Millett Hall (579); Oxford, OH
January 6, 2015*; 7:05 PM		South Carolina Upstate	L 49–61	5–12	15 – Williams, Jr.	9 – Holliday	3 – Holliday, Williams, Jr., Taylor	Municipal Auditorium (926); Kansas City, MO
Conference Regular Season
January 10, 2015; 8:00 PM, KSMO–TV		at New Mexico State	L 45–63	5–13 (0–1)	12 – Harrison	5 – Austin	2 – Taylor	Pan American Center (5,707); Las Cruces, NM
January 17, 2015; 2:05 PM, KSMO–TV		Chicago State	W 64–62	6–13 (1–1)	24 – Harrison	7 – Holliday	3 – Taylor	Municipal Auditorium (1,107); Kansas City, MO
January 22, 2015; 7:05 PM, KSMO–TV		Cal State Bakersfield	W 66–63	7–13 (2–1)	17 – Harrison	6 – Holliday, Austin	3 – Harrison, Taylor	Municipal Auditorium (1,477); Kansas City, MO
January 24, 2015; 6:05 PM		Seattle	W 75–55	8–13 (3–1)	23 – Harrison	6 – Kreuer	5 – Williams, Jr., Harrison	Municipal Auditorium (1,749); Kansas City, MO
January 29, 2015; 8:00 PM, Cox 7		at Grand Canyon	L 57–78	8–14 (3–2)	13 – Harrison	6 – Austin	3 – Williams, Jr.	GCU Arena (5,121); Phoenix, AZ
January 31, 2015; 8:30 PM, ASN		at Utah Valley	W 66–59	9–14 (4–2)	17 – Holliday, Harrison	6 – Holliday	7 – Harrison	UCCU Center (2,670); Orem, UT
February 5, 2015; 7:05 PM, ASN		Texas–Pan American	W 70–45	10–14 (5–2)	20 – Harrison	5 – Holliday, Newbill, Jennings	6 – Harrison	Municipal Auditorium (1,022); Kansas City, MO
February 7, 2015; 6:05 PM, KSMO–TV		New Mexico State	L 63–77	10–15 (5–3)	19 – Harrison	3 – Williams, Jr., Kreuer	5 – Harrison	Municipal Auditorium (2,937); Kansas City, MO
February 14, 2015; 2:00 PM, ESPN3		at Chicago State	W 61–50	11–15 (6–3)	19 – Holliday	6 – Taylor	3 – Harrison	Emil and Patricia; Jones Convocation Center (516); Chicago, IL
February 18, 2015; 9:00 PM		at Seattle	L 56–74	11–16 (6–4)	17 – Holliday	7 – Smith	3 – Williams, Jr., Harrison	KeyArena (1,954); Seattle, WA
February 21, 2015; 9:00 PM		at Cal State Bakersfield	L 62–64	11–17 (6–5)	28 – Harrison	8 – Smith	5 – Harrison	Jimmie and Marjorie; Icardo Center (1,305); Bakersfield, CA
February 26, 2015; 7:05 PM, KSMO–TV		Utah Valley	W 69–50	12–17 (7–5)	16 – Holliday	9 – Smith	5 – Harrison	Municipal Auditorium (1,204); Kansas City, MO
February 28, 2015; 6:05 PM		Grand Canyon	W 70–65	13–17 (8–5)	24 – Holliday	9 – Smith	3 – Harrison	Municipal Auditorium (1,917); Kansas City, MO
March 7, 2015; 2:00 PM, ASN		at Texas–Pan American	L 51–53	13–18 (8–6)	16 – Harrison	7 – Smith	2 – Williams, Jr., Harrison	UTPA Fieldhouse (2,308); Edinburg, TX
Conference Tournament
March 12, 2015*; 6:30 PM	(2)	vs. (7) Texas–Pan American [Quarterfinal]	W 70–61	14–18	18 – Holliday	9 – Williams, Jr.	6 – Harrison	Orleans Arena (1,060); Paradise, NV
March 13, 2015*; 10:30 PM	(2)	vs. (3) Seattle [Semifinal]	L 63–69	14–19	16 – Taylor	5 – Holliday	4 – Harrison	Orleans Arena (1,723); Paradise, NV
*Non-conference game. ^{#}Rankings from AP Poll. (#) Tournament seedings in parentheses. All times are in Central Standard Time (CST).
