= 2014–15 Creighton Bluejays men's basketball team =

American college basketball season

2014–15 Creighton Bluejays men's basketball
- Conference: Big East Conference
- Record: 14–19 (4–14 Big East)
- Head coach: Greg McDermott (5th year)
- Assistant coaches: Darian DeVries (17th year); Steve Lutz (5th year); Steve Merfeld (5th year); Patrick Sellers (2nd year)
- Home arena: CenturyLink Center Omaha

2014–15 Big East men's basketball standings
	Conf.				Overall
Team	W		L	PCT	W		L	PCT
No. 2 Villanova †	16	–	2	.889	33	–	3	.917
No. 22 Georgetown	12	–	6	.667	22	–	11	.667
No. 24 Butler	12	–	6	.667	23	–	11	.676
Providence	11	–	7	.611	22	–	12	.647
St. John's	10	–	8	.556	21	–	12	.636
Xavier	9	–	9	.500	23	–	14	.622
DePaul	6	–	12	.333	12	–	20	.375
Seton Hall	6	–	12	.333	16	–	15	.516
Marquette	4	–	14	.222	13	–	19	.406
Creighton	4	–	14	.222	14	–	19	.424
† 2015 Big East tournament winner As of April 6, 2015; Rankings from AP poll

The 2014–15 Creighton Bluejays men's basketball team represented Creighton University during the 2014–15 NCAA Division I men's basketball season. The Bluejays, led by fifth-year head coach Greg McDermott, played their home games at the CenturyLink Center Omaha, and were members of the Big East Conference. They finished the season 14–19, 4–14 in Big East play to finish in a tie for ninth place. They advanced to the quarterfinals of the Big East tournament where they lost to Georgetown.

== Previous season ==
The Bluejays finished the season with an overall record of 27–8, with a record of 14–4 in the Big East regular season for a second-place finish. In the 2014 Big East tournament, the Bluejays were defeated by Providence, 65–58 in the championship game. They were invited to the 2014 NCAA Men's Division I Basketball Tournament which they defeated Louisiana–Lafayette in the second round before losing to Baylor in third round.

== Off season ==
=== Departures ===
Name	Number	Pos.	Height	Weight	Year	Hometown	Notes
Doug McDermott	3	F	6'8"	225	Senior	Ames, IA	Graduated/2014 NBA draft
Alex Olsen	4	F	6'6"	190	RS Sophomore	Council Bluffs, IA	Left the team due to focus on academics
Grant Gibbs	10	G	6'5"	210	RS Senior	Marion, IA	Graduated
Jahenns Manigat	12	G	6'1"	175	Senior	Ottawa, ON	Graduated
Darian Harris	15	G	6'6"	185	Freshman	Springdale, AR	Transferred to Oral Roberts
John Burns	20	G	6'4"	180	Freshman	Algona, IA	Transferred to Morningside College
Eric Roberts	25	G	6'4"	215	Freshman	Eagle River, AK	Walk-on didn't return
Ethan Wragge	34	F	6'7"	225	RS Senior	Eden Prairie, MN	Graduated

=== Incoming transfers ===
Name	Number	Pos.	Height	Weight	Year	Hometown	Notes
Maurice Watson, Jr.	10	G	5'10"	165	Junior	Philadelphia, PA	Transferred from Boston University. Under NCAA transfer rules, Watson, Jr. will have to redshirt for the 2014–15 season. Will have two years of remaining eligibility.
Cole Huff	13	F	6'8"	205	Junior	Altadena, CA	Transferred from Nevada. Under NCAA transfer rules, Huff will have to redshirt for the 2014–15 season. Will have two years of remaining eligibility.
Ricky Kreklow	24	G	6'6"	210	RS Senior	Columbia, MO	Transferred from California. He will be eligible to play immediately under the NCAA's graduate transfer rule.

== Incoming recruits ==
College recruiting information
Name	Hometown	School	Height	Weight	Commit date
Ronnie Harrell; SF	Denver, CO	Denver East	6 ft 7 in (2.01 m)	180 lb (82 kg)	Sep 30, 2013
Ronnie Harrell; SF	Recruit ratings: Scout: Rivals: (84)				
Leon Gilmore III; SF	Manvel, TX	Manvel High School	6 ft 7 in (2.01 m)	215 lb (98 kg)	Sep 23, 2013
Leon Gilmore III; SF	Recruit ratings: Scout: Rivals: (79)				
Overall recruit ranking:
Note: In many cases, Scout, Rivals, 247Sports, On3, and ESPN may conflict in their listings of height and weight.; In these cases, the average was taken. ESPN grades are on a 100-point scale.; Sources: "2014 Team Ranking". Rivals.

== Roster ==
2014–15 Creighton Bluejays men's basketball team
Players
Coaches

Pos.	#	Name	Height	Weight	Year	Previous school	Hometown
F	0	Leon Gilmore III (injured)	6 ft 7 in (2.01 m)	210 lb (95 kg)	Fr	Manvel HS	Manvel, TX
G	1	Austin Chatman	6 ft 0 in (1.83 m)	175 lb (79 kg)	Sr	The Colony	The Colony, TX
F	2	Gabriel Connealy (W)	6 ft 4 in (1.93 m)	205 lb (93 kg)	Jr	Mullen HS	Mullen, NE
F	4	Ronnie Harrell (redshirt)	6 ft 7 in (2.01 m)	180 lb (82 kg)	Fr	East HS	Denver, CO
G	5	Devin Brooks	6 ft 2 in (1.88 m)	175 lb (79 kg)	Sr	St. Raymond; Iowa Western CC	Harlem, NY
G	10	Maurice Watson (redshirt)	5 ft 10 in (1.78 m)	170 lb (77 kg)	Jr	Boys' Latin; Boston University	Philadelphia, PA
G	11	Tyler Clement (W)	6 ft 1 in (1.85 m)	185 lb (84 kg)	Fr	St. Thomas Aquinas	Overland Park, KS
F	13	Cole Huff (redshirt)	6 ft 8 in (2.03 m)	210 lb (95 kg)	Jr	Campbell Hall HS; Nevada	Altadena, CA
G	15	Ricky Kreklow (W)	6 ft 7 in (2.01 m)	195 lb (88 kg)	RS Sr	Rock Bridge HS; California	Columbia, MO
G	21	Isaiah Zierden (injured)	6 ft 2 in (1.88 m)	180 lb (82 kg)	RS So	Benilde-St. Margaret's	St. Louis Park, MN
G	22	Avery Dingman	6 ft 6 in (1.98 m)	215 lb (98 kg)	Sr	Branson	Branson, MO
G	23	James Milliken	6 ft 2 in (1.88 m)	180 lb (82 kg)	RS Jr	Jordan–Matthews; Cowley County CC	Siler City, NC
C	31	Will Artino	6 ft 11 in (2.11 m)	230 lb (104 kg)	Sr	Waukee	Waukee, Iowa
F	32	Toby Hegner	6 ft 10 in (2.08 m)	225 lb (102 kg)	RS Fr	Berlin	Berlin, WI
F	40	Zach Hanson	6 ft 9 in (2.06 m)	240 lb (109 kg)	So	T. F. Riggs	Pierre, SD
C	41	Geoffrey Groselle	7 ft 0 in (2.13 m)	240 lb (109 kg)	Jr	Plano West	Plano, TX
F	50	Mogboluwaga Oginni (W)	6 ft 8 in (2.03 m)	225 lb (102 kg)	Jr	Saint Louis University HS	St. Louis, MO

Head coach

- Greg McDermott (Northern Iowa)

Assistant coach(es)

- Darian DeVries (Northern Iowa)
- Steve Lutz (Texas Lutheran)
- Steve Merfeld (UW–La Crosse)
- Patrick Sellers (Central Connecticut State)

Legend

- (C) Team captain
- (S) Suspended
- (I) Ineligible
- (W) Walk-on
- Injured
- Current redshirt

Roster

=== Depth chart ===
Pos.	Starting 5	Bench 1	Bench 2	Bench 3
C	Geoff Groselle	Will Artino	Zach Hanson	Mogboluwaga Oginni
PF	Toby Hegner
SF	Ricky Kreklow	Avery Dingman	Gabriel Connealy
SG	James Milliken	Devin Brooks
PG	Austin Chatman	Tyler Clement

== Rankings ==
Ranking movement Legend: ██ Improvement in ranking. ██ Decrease in ranking. RV=Received votes.
Poll	Pre	Wk 2	Wk 3	Wk 4	Wk 5	Wk 6	Wk 7	Wk 8	Wk 9	Wk 10	Wk 11	Wk 12	Wk 13	Wk 14	Wk 15	Wk 16	Wk 17	Wk 18	Wk 19	Final
AP			23	RV	RV															N/A
Coaches			RV	RV	RV															

== Schedule and results ==
Date time, TV	Rank^{#}	Opponent^{#}	Result	Record	Site (attendance) city, state
Exhibition
11/07/2014; 7:00 pm		Sioux Falls	W 91–72		CenturyLink Center (16,317); Omaha, NE
Non-conference regular season
11/14/2014*; 8:00 pm, FSN		Central Arkansas	W 104–77	1–0	CenturyLink Center (18,160); Omaha, NE
11/16/2014*; 4:30 pm, FS1		Chicago State	W 84–66	2–0	CenturyLink Center (16,143); Omaha, NE
11/19/2014*; 7:00 pm, FS1		No. 18 Oklahoma	W 65–63	3–0	CenturyLink Center (17,393); Omaha, NE
11/23/2014*; 3:00 pm, FS1		North Carolina Central; Emerald Coast Classic First round	W 65–45	4–0	CenturyLink Center (17,290); Omaha, NE
11/25/2014*; 7:00 pm, FS1	No. 23	Eastern Illinois; Emerald Coast Classic Second round	W 75–53	5–0	CenturyLink Center (17,408); Omaha, NE
11/28/2014*; 7:30 pm	No. 23	vs. Ole Miss; Emerald Coast Classic Third round	L 68–75	5–1	The Arena at NWFSC (1,600); Niceville, FL
11/29/2014*; 5:00 pm	No. 23	vs. Middle Tennessee; Emerald Coast Classic third-place game	W 57–47	6–1	The Arena at NWFSC (1,215); Niceville, FL
12/03/2014*; 7:00 pm, ESPN3		at Tulsa	L 64–77	6–2	Reynolds Center (4,383); Tulsa, OK
12/07/2014*; 6:00 pm, BTN		at Nebraska; Rivalry	W 65–55	7–2	Pinnacle Bank Arena (15,782); Lincoln, NE
12/09/2014*; 8:00 pm, FS1		South Dakota	W 91–88 ^{2OT}	8–2	CenturyLink Center (16,270); Omaha, NE
12/13/2014*; 1:00 pm, FS1		Saint Mary's	L 67–71 ^{OT}	8–3	CenturyLink Center (16,435); Omaha, NE
12/19/2014*; 8:00 pm, FS2		Texas–Pan American	W 75–60	9–3	CenturyLink Center (17,196); Omaha, NE
12/21/2014*; 1:00 pm, FSN		at North Texas	L 58–62	9–4	The Super Pit (4,227); Denton, TX
Big East Conference play
12/31/2014; 6:30 pm, FS1		at Providence	L 53–65	9–5 (0–1)	Dunkin Donuts Center (8,961); Providence, RI
01/03/2015; 3:30 pm, FS1		at No. 25 Georgetown	L 61–76	9–6 (0–2)	Verizon Center (11,164); Washington, D.C.
01/07/2015; 8:00 pm, FS1		DePaul	L 60–70	9–7 (0–3)	CenturyLink Center (16,126); Omaha, NE
01/10/2015; 1:00 pm, FS1		No. 19 Seton Hall	L 67–68	9–8 (0–4)	CenturyLink Center (17,397); Omaha, NE
01/14/2015; 8:00 pm, CBSSN		at Marquette	L 52–53	9–9 (0–5)	BMO Harris Bradley Center (13,069); Milwaukee, WI
01/17/2015; 6:30 pm, FS1		Providence	L 65–74	9–10 (0–6)	CenturyLink Center (17,640); Omaha, NE
01/21/2015; 8:00 pm, FS1		at Butler	L 61–64	9–11 (0–7)	Hinkle Fieldhouse (6,114); Indianapolis, IN
01/25/2015; 6:00 pm, FS1		at No. 4 Villanova	L 50–71	9–12 (0–8)	The Pavilion (6,500); Villanova, PA
01/28/2015; 8:00 pm, FS1		St. John's	W 77–74	10–12 (1–8)	CenturyLink Center (16,544); Omaha, NE
01/31/2015; 1:00 pm, CBSSN		No. 21 Georgetown	L 40–67	10–13 (1–9)	CenturyLink Center (17,499); Omaha, NE
02/04/2015; 8:10 pm, FS1		at Xavier	W 79–72 ^{OT}	11–13 (2–9)	Cintas Center (9,843); Cincinnati, OH
02/07/2015; 11:00 am, FSN		at St. John's	L 66–84	11–14 (2–10)	Madison Square Garden (10,759); New York, NY
02/14/2015; 12:00 pm, FS1		Marquette	W 77–70	12–14 (3–10)	CenturyLink Center (17,248); Omaha, NE
02/16/2015; 8:15 pm, FS1		No. 19 Butler	L 56–58	12–15 (3–11)	CenturyLink Center (17,971); Omaha, NE
02/24/2015; 8:15 pm, FS1		at DePaul	W 75–62	13–15 (4–11)	Allstate Arena (6,157); Rosemont, IL
02/28/2015; 3:00 pm, CBSSN		at Seton Hall	L 66–67	13–16 (4–12)	Prudential Center (8,507); Newark, NJ
03/03/2015; 8:15 pm, FS1		No. 4 Villanova	L 72–76	13–17 (4–13)	CenturyLink Center (16,337); Omaha, NE
03/07/2015; 1:00 pm, FSN		Xavier	L 73–74	13–18 (4–14)	CenturyLink Center (16,751); Omaha, NE
Big East tournament
03/11/2015; 8:30 p.m., FS1		vs. DePaul; First round	W 78–63	14–18	Madison Square Garden (12,588); New York, NY
03/12/2015; 8:30 p.m., FS1		vs. No. 23 Georgetown; Quarterfinals	L 55–60	14–19	Madison Square Garden (13,245); New York, NY
*Non-conference game. ^{#}Rankings from AP Poll. (#) Tournament seedings in parentheses. All times are in Central Time.
