= 2014–15 Seattle Redhawks men's basketball team =

American college basketball season

2014–15 Seattle Redhawks men's basketball

CBI, Semifinals
- Conference: Western Athletic Conference
- Record: 18–16 (7–7 WAC)
- Head coach: Cameron Dollar (6th season)
- Assistant coaches: Donald Dollar; Amadou "Pape" Koundoul; Darren Talley
- Home arena: KeyArena; Connolly Center

2014–15 WAC men's basketball standings
	Conf.				Overall
Team	W		L	PCT	W		L	PCT
New Mexico State †	13	–	1	.929	23	–	11	.676
Grand Canyon *	8	–	6	.571	17	–	15	.531
UMKC	8	–	6	.571	14	–	19	.424
Seattle	7	–	7	.500	18	–	16	.529
Cal State Bakersfield	7	–	7	.500	14	–	19	.424
Utah Valley	5	–	9	.357	11	–	19	.367
Chicago State	4	–	10	.286	8	–	24	.250
Texas–Pan American	4	–	10	.286	10	–	21	.323
† 2015 WAC tournament winner * ineligible due to transition from NCAA Division II.

The 2014–15 Seattle Redhawks men's basketball team represented Seattle University during the 2014–15 NCAA Division I men's basketball season. The Redhawks, led by sixth year head coach Cameron Dollar, played their home games at KeyArena, with three home game at the Connolly Center, and were members of the Western Athletic Conference. They finished the season 18–16, 7–7 in WAC play to finish in a tie for fourth place. They advanced to the championship game of the WAC tournament where they lost to New Mexico State. They were invited to the College Basketball Invitational where they defeated Pepperdine in the first round and Colorado in the quarterfinals before losing in the semifinals to Loyola–Chicago.

== Previous season ==
The Redhawks finished the season 13–17, 5–11 in WAC play to finish in a three way tie for seventh place. They lost in the quarterfinals of the WAC tournament to New Mexico State.

== Off season ==
=== Departures ===
Name	Number	Pos.	Height	Weight	Year	Hometown	Notes
D'Vonne Pickett, Jr.	5	G	6'0"	195	Senior	Seattle, WA	Graduated
Clarence Trent	12	F	6'6"	225	Senior	Tacoma, WA	Graduated

== 2014 incoming recruits ==
College recruiting information
Name	Hometown	School	Height	Weight	Commit date
Jadon Cohee; PG	Langley, BC	Walnut Grove Secondary School	6 ft 4 in (1.93 m)	N/A	N/A
Jadon Cohee; PG	Recruit ratings: Scout: Rivals: (NR)				
Aaron Menzies; C	Manchester, England	Loreto College	7 ft 1 in (2.16 m)	N/A	N/A
Aaron Menzies; C	Recruit ratings: Scout: Rivals: (NR)				
Overall recruit ranking:
Note: In many cases, Scout, Rivals, 247Sports, On3, and ESPN may conflict in their listings of height and weight.; In these cases, the average was taken. ESPN grades are on a 100-point scale.; Sources: "2014 Team Ranking". Rivals.

== Roster ==
2014–15 Seattle Redhawks men's basketball team
Players
Coaches

Pos.	#	Name	Height	Weight	Year	Previous school	Hometown
G	1	Isiah Umipig	6 ft 0 in (1.83 m)	195 lb (88 kg)	RS Sr	Cal State Fullerton; Federal Way HS	Federal Way, WA
G	2	Emerson Murray	6 ft 3 in (1.91 m)	195 lb (88 kg)	RS Sr	California; St. George's School	Vancouver, BC
C	10	Theo Turner	7 ft 0 in (2.13 m)	245 lb (111 kg)	RS Fr	Canarias Academy	Middlesbrough, England
F	11	Deshaun Sunderhaus	6 ft 9 in (2.06 m)	250 lb (113 kg)	RS Jr	Rockdale County HS	Conyers, GA
G	12	Jadon Cohee	6 ft 4 in (1.93 m)	190 lb (86 kg)	Fr	Walnut Grove Secondary	Langley, BC
G	13	Emmanuel Chibuogwu	6 ft 6 in (1.98 m)	210 lb (95 kg)	RS So	Shorecrest HS	Shoreline, WA
G	14	Jack Shaughnessy	6 ft 2 in (1.88 m)	180 lb (82 kg)	Fr	Etowah HS	Woodstock, GA
F	15	Shore Adenekan	6 ft 9 in (2.06 m)	240 lb (109 kg)	Sr	Lamar CC; Brampton Manor Acad.	London, England
F	21	William Powell	6 ft 6 in (1.98 m)	210 lb (95 kg)	So	IMG Acad. Huntsville HS	Huntsville, AL
G	23	Manroop Clair	6 ft 2 in (1.88 m)	180 lb (82 kg)	RS So	Hawaii; Huntington Prep	Vancouver, BC
C	24	Jack Crook	6 ft 11 in (2.11 m)	265 lb (120 kg)	Jr	Loreto College	Manchester, England
G	25	David Trimble	6 ft 1 in (1.85 m)	185 lb (84 kg)	Jr	Davis HS	Yakima, WA
G	33	Luis Bidart	6 ft 0 in (1.83 m)	195 lb (88 kg)	RS Jr	Christian HS	São Paulo, Brazil
G	35	Jarell Flora	6 ft 3 in (1.91 m)	200 lb (91 kg)	RS Sr	Bremerton HS	Bremerton, WA
C	41	Aaron Menzies	7 ft 3 in (2.21 m)	260 lb (118 kg)	Fr	Loreto Academy	London, England

Head coach

- Cameron Dollar (UCLA)

Assistant coach(es)

- Donald Dollar (Morehouse)
- Amadou "Pape" Koundoul (Cleveland State)
- Darren Talley (Chapman)

Legend

- (C) Team captain
- (S) Suspended
- (I) Ineligible
- (W) Walk-on
- Injured
- Current redshirt

Roster

== Schedule ==
Date time, TV	Opponent	Result	Record	Site (attendance) city, state
Non-conference regular season
11/14/2014*; 7:00 pm	Texas State	L 53–62	0–1	KeyArena (3,250); Seattle, WA
11/19/2014*; 7:00 pm	Omaha	W 98–74	1–1	KeyArena (1,535); Seattle, WA
11/21/2014*; 7:00 pm, KZJO	Washington; Elgin Baylor Classic	L 48–63	1–2	KeyArena (5,319); Seattle, WA
11/23/2014*; 7:30 pm	Montana; Marv Harshman Classic	L 62–66	1–3	KeyArena (2,512); Seattle, WA
11/29/2014*; 7:00 pm	Cal State Northidge	W 70–58	2–3	KeyArena (1,517); Seattle, WA
12/01/2014*; 7:00 pm	vs. Pacific Lutheran; ShoWare College Showdown	W 72–33	3–3	ShoWare Center (554); Kent, WA
12/04/2014*; 7:00 pm	at UC Santa Barbara	L 46–87	3–4	The Thunderdome (2,518); Santa Barbara, CA
12/06/2014*; 7:00 pm	Eastern Washington	L 75–87	3–5	KeyArena (3,417); Seattle, WA
12/13/2014*; 7:00 pm	at San Jose State	W 54–38	4–5	Event Center Arena (1,415); San Jose, CA
12/15/2014*; 7:00 pm	Northwest	W 84–58	5–5	Connolly Center (267); Seattle, WA
12/19/2014*; 5:00 pm, BTN	at Minnesota	L 57–92	5–6	Williams Arena (12,121); Minneapolis, MN
12/21/2014*; 7:00 pm	Sacramento State	W 66–47	6–6	KeyArena (1,599); Seattle, WA
12/30/2014*; 7:00 pm	UC Davis	W 76–67	7–6	KeyArena (1,635); Seattle, WA
01/03/2015*; 2:00 pm	at Cal State Fullerton	L 55–67	7–7	Titan Gym (738); Fullerton, CA
WAC Regular season
01/10/2015; 6:00 pm	at Utah Valley	L 52–70	7–8 (0–1)	UCCU Center (1,888); Orem, UT
01/15/2015; 7:00 pm	Texas–Pan American	W 70–47	8–8 (1–1)	KeyArena (1,701); Seattle, WA
01/17/2015; 7:00 pm, ASN	New Mexico State	W 58–52	9–8 (2–1)	KeyArena (2,128); Seattle, WA
01/22/2015; 5:00 pm, ASN	at Chicago State	W 75–67	10–8 (3–1)	Emil and Patricia Jones Convocation Center (257); Chicago, IL
01/24/2015; 5:00 pm	at UMKC	L 55–75	10–9 (3–2)	Municipal Auditorium (1,749); Kansas City, MO
01/31/2015; 7:00 pm	at Cal State Bakersfield	L 61–71 ^{OT}	10–10 (3–3)	Icardo Center (1,113); Bakersfield, CA
02/05/2015; 7:00 pm	Grand Canyon	L 64–66	10–11 (3–4)	KeyArena (1,682); Seattle, WA
02/07/2015; 7:00 pm	Utah Valley	W 53–33	11–11 (4–4)	KeyArena (2,563); Seattle, WA
02/12/2015; 6:00 pm	at New Mexico State	L 47–73	11–12 (4–5)	Pan American Center (5,544); Las Cruces, NM
02/14/2015; 5:00 pm	at Texas–Pan American	L 57–68	11–13 (4–6)	UTPA Fieldhouse (748); Edinburg, TX
02/18/2015; 7:00 pm	UMKC	W 74–56	12–13 (5–6)	KeyArena (1,954); Seattle, WA
02/21/2015; 7:00 pm	Chicago State	W 57–31	13–13 (6–6)	KeyArena (1,918); Seattle, WA
02/28/2015; 7:00 pm, ASN	Cal State Bakersfield	W 53–43	14–13 (7–6)	KeyArena (2,063); Seattle, WA
03/07/2015; 6:00 pm	at Grand Canyon	L 70–83	14–14 (7–7)	GCU Arena (7,077); Phoenix, AZ
WAC tournament
03/12/2015; 7:00 pm	vs. Chicago State; Quarterfinals	W 49–45	15–14	Orleans Arena (1,060); Paradise, NV
03/13/2015; 8:30 pm	vs. UMKC; Semifinals	W 69–63	16–14	Orleans Arena (1,723); Paradise, NV
03/14/2015; 8:30 pm, ESPNU	vs. New Mexico State; Championship game	L 61–80	16–15	Orleans Arena (1,763); Paradise, NV
College Basketball Invitational
03/18/2015*; 7:00 pm	Pepperdine; First round	W 62–45	17–15	Connolly Center (999); Seattle, WA
03/23/2015*; 7:00 pm	Colorado; Quarterfinals	W 72–65	18–15	Connolly Center (999); Seattle, WA
03/25/2015*; 5:00 pm	at Loyola–Chicago; Semifinals	L 48–63	18–16	Joseph J. Gentile Arena (1,265); Chicago, IL
*Non-conference game. ^{#}Rankings from AP Poll. (#) Tournament seedings in parentheses. All times are in Pacific Time.
