= 2014–15 Cal State Bakersfield Roadrunners men's basketball team =

American college basketball season

2014–15 Cal State Bakersfield Roadrunners men's basketball
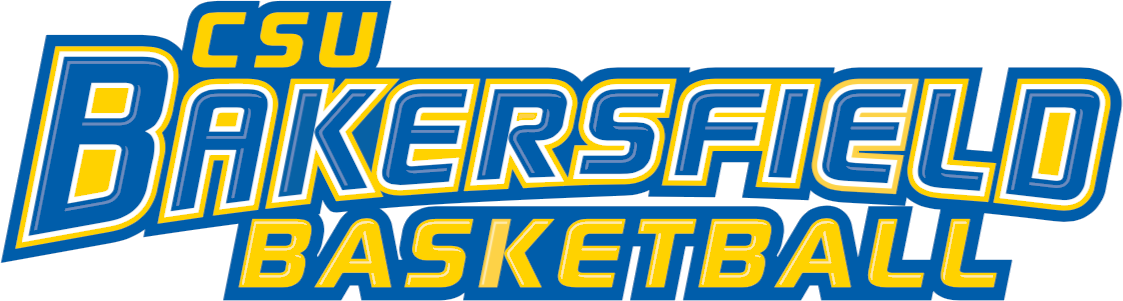
- Conference: Western Athletic Conference
- Record: 14–19 (7–7 WAC)
- Head coach: Rod Barnes (4th season)
- Assistant coaches: Jeff Conarroe; Marc Hsu
- Home arena: Icardo Center

2014–15 WAC men's basketball standings
	Conf.				Overall
Team	W		L	PCT	W		L	PCT
New Mexico State †	13	–	1	.929	23	–	11	.676
Grand Canyon *	8	–	6	.571	17	–	15	.531
UMKC	8	–	6	.571	14	–	19	.424
Seattle	7	–	7	.500	18	–	16	.529
Cal State Bakersfield	7	–	7	.500	14	–	19	.424
Utah Valley	5	–	9	.357	11	–	19	.367
Chicago State	4	–	10	.286	8	–	24	.250
Texas–Pan American	4	–	10	.286	10	–	21	.323
† 2015 WAC tournament winner * ineligible due to transition from NCAA Division II.

The 2014–15 Cal State Bakersfield Roadrunners men's basketball team represented California State University, Bakersfield during the 2014–15 NCAA Division I men's basketball season. The Roadrunners were led by fourth year head coach Rod Barnes and played their home games at the Icardo Center. The Roadrunners competed as member of the Western Athletic Conference. They finished the season 14–19, 7–7 in WAC play to finish in a tie for fourth place. They advanced to the semifinals of the WAC tournament where they lost to New Mexico State.

== Previous season ==
The Roadrunners finished the season 13–19, 5–11 in WAC play to finish in a three way tie for seventh place. They advanced to the semifinals of the WAC tournament where they lost to New Mexico State.

== Roster ==
Number	Name	Position	Height	Weight	Year	Hometown
0	Matt Smith	Forward	6–6	190	Junior	Jackson, Tennessee
1	Brent Wrapp	Guard	6–3	175	RS Freshman	Boulder, Colorado
2	Tyrell Corbin	Guard	6–0	185	Senior	Salt Lake City, Utah
3	Javonte Maynor	Guard	6–0	180	Redshirt Senior	Snellville, Georgia
4	Cortez Connors	Guard	6–2	185	Junior	St. Louis, Missouri
5	Dashawn Richmond	Guard	6–3	200	Junior	Staten Island, New York
10	Kevin Mays	Forward	6–4	220	Junior	Queens, New York
11	Jaylin Airington	Guard	6–4	180	RS Sophomore	East Chicago, Indiana
15	Kregg Jones	Forward	6–8	235	Redshirt Senior	Saint George, Barbados
23	Abdul Ahmed	Center	6–10	240	Redshirt Senior	London, Great Britain
25	Dee Wallace	Guard	5–10	150	Redshirt Senior	Oxford, Mississippi
30	J. J. Thomas	Forward	6–5	215	RS Senior	Opelousas, Louisiana
31	Brandon Morris	Forward	6–7	215	Junior	Lithonia, Georgia
32	Bray Barnes	Forward	6–5	180	Freshman	Bakersfield, California
42	Aly Ahmed	Center	6–9	250	Junior	Alexandria, Egypt

== Schedule ==
Date time, TV	Opponent	Result	Record	Site (attendance) city, state
Exitbition
11/08/2014*; 7:00 pm	Whittier	W 82–62		Icardo Center (712); Bakersfield, CA
Regular season
11/14/2014*; 7:00 pm	vs. High Point; Outrigger Resorts Rainbow Classic	L 99–100 ^{4OT}	0–1	Stan Sheriff Center (5,875); Honolulu, HI
11/15/2014*; 9:30 pm	at Hawaii; Outrigger Resorts Rainbow Classic	L 65–72	0–2	Stan Sheriff Center (6,070); Honolulu, HI
11/17/2014*; 7:00 pm	vs. Arkansas–Pine Bluff; Outrigger Resorts Rainbow Classic	L 49–56	0–3	Stan Sheriff Center (5,805); Honolulu, HI
11/20/2014*; 7:30 pm, FSSD	at No. 16 San Diego State	L 27–51	0–4	Viejas Arena (12,414); San Diego, CA
11/23/2014*; 4:00 pm	Delaware	W 70–52	1–4	Icardo Center (841); Bakersfield, CA
11/30/2014*; 4:00 pm	South Dakota	L 66–68	1–5	Icardo Center (885); Bakersfield, CA
12/02/2014*; 7:00 pm	UC Riverside	L 58–59	1–6	Icardo Center (763); Bakersfield, CA
12/06/2014*; 7:00 pm	Fresno State	L 61–63	1–7	Icardo Center (2,491); Bakersfield, CA
12/13/2014*; 1:05 pm	at Portland State	L 59–65	1–8	Stott Center (493); Portland, OR
12/18/2014*; 7:05 pm	at Utah State; World Vision Classic	L 56–57	1–9	Smith Spectrum (7,049); Logan, UT
12/19/2014*; 4:30 pm	vs. South Dakota State; World Vision Classic	L 49–53	1–10	Smith Spectrum (7,188); Logan, UT
12/20/2014*; 4:30 pm	vs. Idaho State; World Vision Classic	W 59–50	2–10	Smith Spectrum (7,216); Logan, UT
12/28/2014*; 7:00 pm, P12N	at California	W 55–52	3–10	Haas Pavilion (6,902); Berkeley, CA
12/31/2014*; 2:00 pm	La Verne	W 87–36	4–10	Icardo Center (727); Bakersfield, CA
01/03/2015*; 4:00 pm	at North Carolina A&T	L 70–83	4–11	Corbett Sports Center (659); Greensboro, NC
01/10/2015; 6:00 pm	at Grand Canyon	L 65–73	4–12 (0–1)	GCU Arena (5,662); Phoenix, AZ
01/15/2015; 7:00 pm	New Mexico State	L 54–70	4–13 (0–2)	Icardo Center (1,402); Bakersfield, CA
01/17/2015; 7:00 pm	Texas–Pan American	W 66–53	5–13 (1–2)	Icardo Center (1,245); Bakersfield, CA
01/22/2015; 5:05 pm	at UMKC	L 63–66	5–14 (1–3)	Municipal Auditorium (1,477); Kansas City, MO
01/24/2015; 12:05 pm	at Chicago State	W 57–41	6–14 (2–3)	Emil and Patricia Jones Convocation Center (517); Chicago, IL
01/27/2015*; 7:00 pm	San Diego Christian	W 79–54	7–14	Icardo Center (487); Bakersfield, CA
01/31/2015; 7:00 pm	Seattle	W 71–61 ^{OT}	8–14 (3–3)	Icardo Center (1,113); Bakersfield, CA
02/05/2015; 7:00 pm	Utah Valley	W 72–69	9–14 (4–3)	Icardo Center (1,060); Bakersfield, CA
02/07/2015; 7:00 pm, ASN	Grand Canyon	L 73–78	9–15 (4–4)	Icardo Center (1,660); Bakersfield, CA
02/12/2015; 5:00 pm	at Texas–Pan American	W 66–54	10–15 (5–4)	UTPA Fieldhouse (1,385); Edinburg, TX
02/14/2015; 6:00 pm, AggieVision	at New Mexico State	L 58–74	10–16 (5–5)	Pan American Center (5,881); Las Cruces, NM
02/19/2015; 7:00 pm	Chicago State	W 64–51	11–16 (6–5)	Icardo Center (915); Bakersfield, CA
02/21/2015; 7:00 pm	UMKC	W 64–62	12–16 (7–5)	Icardo Center (1,305); Bakersfield, CA
02/24/2015*; 7:00 pm	Bristol University	W 95–81	13–16	Icardo Center (720); Bakersfield, CA
02/28/2015; 7:00 pm, ASN	at Seattle	L 43–53	13–17 (7–6)	KeyArena (2,063); Seattle, WA
03/07/2015; 6:05 pm	at Utah Valley	L 69–74	13–18 (7–7)	UCCU Center (2,309); Orem, UT
WAC tournament
03/12/2015; 2:00 pm	vs. Utah Valley; Quarterfinals	W 55–40	14–18	Orleans Arena (1,060); Paradise, NV
03/13/2015; 6:00 pm	vs. New Mexico State; Semifinals	L 52–57	14–19	Orleans Arena (1,723); Paradise, NV
*Non-conference game. ^{#}Rankings from AP Poll. (#) Tournament seedings in parentheses. All times are in Pacific Time.
