= 2014–15 Texas–Pan American Broncs men's basketball team =

American college basketball season

2014–15 Texas–Pan American Broncs men's basketball
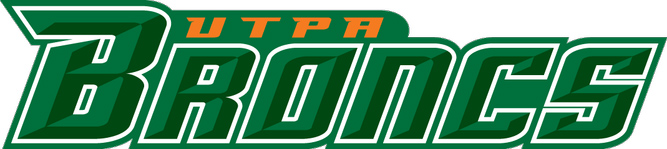
- Conference: Western Athletic Conference
- Record: 10–21 (4–10 WAC)
- Head coach: Dan Hipsher (2nd season)
- Assistant coaches: Andy Hipsher (2nd season); Jai Steadman (1st season); Willie Watson (1st season)
- Home arena: UTPA Fieldhouse

2014–15 WAC men's basketball standings
	Conf.				Overall
Team	W		L	PCT	W		L	PCT
New Mexico State †	13	–	1	.929	23	–	11	.676
Grand Canyon *	8	–	6	.571	17	–	15	.531
UMKC	8	–	6	.571	14	–	19	.424
Seattle	7	–	7	.500	18	–	16	.529
Cal State Bakersfield	7	–	7	.500	14	–	19	.424
Utah Valley	5	–	9	.357	11	–	19	.367
Chicago State	4	–	10	.286	8	–	24	.250
Texas–Pan American	4	–	10	.286	10	–	21	.323
† 2015 WAC tournament winner * ineligible due to transition from NCAA Division II.

The 2014–15 Texas–Pan American Broncs men's basketball team represented the University of Texas–Pan American during the 2014–15 NCAA Division I men's basketball season. This were head coach Dan Hipsher's second season at UTPA. The Broncs played their home games at the UTPA Fieldhouse and were members of the Western Athletic Conference. They finished the season 10–21, 4–10 in WAC play to finish in a tie for seventh place. They lost in the quarterfinals of the WAC tournament to UMKC.

This was the final season for UTPA as an institution. In 2013, the University of Texas System (UT System) announced that UTPA would merge with the University of Texas at Brownsville to create the new University of Texas Rio Grande Valley (UTRGV), with the new university entering full operation in the 2015–16 school year. The UT System announced in July 2014 that UTRGV would inherit the UTPA athletic program, and in November 2014 UTRGV's new nickname of Vaqueros was announced.

== Roster ==
2014–15 UTPA Broncs men's basketball team
Players
Coaches

Pos.	#	Name	Height	Weight	Year	Previous school	Hometown
G	0	Everett Osborne	6 ft 4 in (1.93 m)	190 lb (86 kg)	RS Jr	Palisades; Los Angeles Trade Tech	Los Angeles, CA
G	1	Elijah Watson	6 ft 2 in (1.88 m)	185 lb (84 kg)	RS Fr	St. Patrick	Chicago, IL
G	2	Mike Lopez	6 ft 1 in (1.85 m)	185 lb (84 kg)	Fr	Wylie	Abilene, TX
G	3	Isaiah Hobbs	6 ft 4 in (1.93 m)	178 lb (81 kg)	Fr	Lake Worth	Boynton Beach, FL
G	5	Shaquile Boga	5 ft 11 in (1.8 m)	170 lb (77 kg)	Sr	McCluer; Mineral Area	St. Louis, MO
G	10	Moe McDonald	6 ft 4 in (1.93 m)	185 lb (84 kg)	RS Fr	IMG Academy	McAllen, TX
F	11	Andreas Bigum	6 ft 9 in (2.06 m)	218 lb (99 kg)	Jr	Sunrise Christian Academy; Northwest	Copenhagen, Denmark
F	21	Janari Jõesaar (redshirt)	6 ft 6 in (1.98 m)	208 lb (94 kg)	So	Sunrise Christian Academy; Ole Miss	Tartu, Estonia
G	22	Shaun Noriega	6 ft 4 in (1.93 m)	207 lb (94 kg)	GS	North Port; South Florida	Sarasota, FL
F	24	Shaquille Hines	6 ft 7 in (2.01 m)	195 lb (88 kg)	Jr	Harlan; Trent Prep High	Chicago, IL
G	30	Jordan Pistokache	6 ft 2 in (1.88 m)	200 lb (91 kg)	RS So	Sharyland; Roberts Wesleyan	Mission, TX
F	32	Adonis Rwabigwi (redshirt)	6 ft 8 in (2.03 m)	220 lb (100 kg)	So	Tampa Prep; Furman	Kigali City, Rwanda
F	33	Josh Butler	6 ft 6 in (1.98 m)	225 lb (102 kg)	So	The Village School; Louisiana Tech	Los Angeles, CA
F	44	Christopher Ikuenobe	6 ft 9 in (2.06 m)	240 lb (109 kg)	RS So	Nigerian Air Force Secondary School; Independence CC	Warri, Nigeria

Head coach

- Dan Hipsher (Bowling Green)

Assistant coach(es)

- Andy Hipsher (Akron)
- Jai Steadman (Nebraska)
- Willie Watson (Alabama)

Legend

- (C) Team captain
- (S) Suspended
- (I) Ineligible
- (W) Walk-on
- Injured
- Current redshirt

== Schedule and results ==
Date time, TV	Opponent	Result	Record	Site (attendance) city, state
Exhibition
11/08/2014*; 7:00 pm, Youtube	Texas A&M International	W 90–72		UTPA Fieldhouse (735); Edinburg, TX
Regular season
11/14/2014*; 7:00 pm, Youtube	Wayland Baptist	W 88–80	1–0	UTPA Fieldhouse (1,130); Edinburg, TX
11/17/2014*; 7:00 pm	at UTSA	W 63–62	2–0	Convocation Center (790); San Antonio, TX
11/22/2014*; 7:00 pm, Youtube	Texas A&M–Kingsville	W 82–77	3–0	UTPA Fieldhouse (1,103); Edinburg, TX
11/26/2014*; 7:00 pm, P12N	at Utah; Utah Tournament	L 48–85	3–1	Jon M. Huntsman Center (9,487); Salt Lake City, UT
11/28/2014*; 6:00 pm	vs. Alabama State; Utah Tournament	L 79–91	3–2	Jon M. Huntsman Center (9,794); Salt Lake City, UT
11/29/2014*; 3:00 pm	vs. North Dakota; Utah Tournament	W 78–60	4–2	Jon M. Huntsman Center (9,921); Salt Lake City, UT
12/04/2014*; 7:00 pm, ESPN3	at Houston	L 58–72	4–3	Hofheinz Pavilion (1,858); Houston, TX
12/06/2014*; 4:30 pm	at Sam Houston State	L 59–78	4–4	Bernard Johnson Coliseum (678); Huntsville, TX
12/13/2014*; 7:00 pm, WAC Digital	Lamar	W 66–60	5–4	UTPA Fieldhouse (921); Edinburg, TX
12/17/2014*; 7:00 pm	at Saint Louis	L 69–75	5–5	Chaifetz Arena (5,173); St. Louis, MO
12/19/2014*; 8:00 pm, FS2	at Creighton	L 60–75	5–6	CenturyLink Center (17,196); Omaha, NE
12/21/2014*; 1:00 pm	at Omaha	L 72–77	5–7	Ralston Arena (1,039); Omaha, NE
12/30/2014*; 6:00 pm	at Duquesne	L 72–78	5–8	Palumbo Center (1,322); Pittsburgh, PA
01/02/2015*; 7:00 pm	at Kent State	L 54–74	5–9	MAC Center (1,732); Kent, OH
01/07/2015*; 7:00 pm, Youtube	Our Lady of the Lake	W 87–78	6–9	UTPA Fieldhouse (832); Edinburg, TX
01/10/2015; 7:00 pm, WAC Digital	Chicago State	W 64–59	7–9 (1–0)	UTPA Fieldhouse (1,004); Edinburg, TX
01/12/2015*; 7:00 pm, WAC Digital	UTSA	L 43–68	7–10	UTPA Fieldhouse (1,096); Edinburg, TX
01/15/2015; 9:00 pm, WAC Digital	at Seattle	L 47–70	7–11 (1–1)	KeyArena (1,701); Seattle, WA
01/17/2015; 9:00 pm	at Cal State Bakersfield	L 53–66	7–12 (1–2)	Icardo Center (1,245); Bakersfield, CA
01/22/2015; 7:00 pm, WAC Digital	Utah Valley	L 54–72	7–13 (1–3)	UTPA Fieldhouse (1,737); Edinburg, TX
01/24/2015; 7:00 pm, WAC Digital	Grand Canyon	W 73–72	8–13 (2–3)	UTPA Fieldhouse (1,037); Edinburg, TX
01/31/2015; 8:00 pm, WAC Digital	at New Mexico State	L 48–53	8–14 (2–4)	Pan American Center (5,892); Las Cruces, NM
02/05/2015; 7:05 pm, ASN	at UMKC	L 45–70	8–15 (2–5)	Municipal Auditorium (1,022); Kansas City, MO
02/07/2015; 2:05 pm, WAC Digital	at Chicago State	L 73–78	8–16 (2–6)	Emil and Patricia Jones Convocation Center (509); Chicago, IL
02/12/2015; 7:00 pm, WAC Digital	Cal State Bakersfield	L 54–66	8–17 (2–7)	UTPA Fieldhouse (1,385); Edinburg, TX
02/14/2015; 7:00 pm, Youtube	Seattle	W 68–57	9–17 (3–7)	UTPA Fieldhouse (748); Edinburg, TX
02/19/2015; 8:00 pm, Cox7/WAC Digital	at Grand Canyon	L 59–64	9–18 (3–8)	GCU Arena (5,501); Phoenix, AZ
02/21/2015; 8:05 pm, Youtube	at Utah Valley	L 49–72	9–19 (3–9)	UCCU Center (1,715); Orem, UT
03/04/2015; 7:00 pm, Youtube	New Mexico State; Postponed from 2/28/15	L 48–69	9–20 (3–10)	UTPA Fieldhouse (787); Edinburg, TX
03/07/2015; 7:00 pm, ASN	UMKC	W 53–51	10–20 (4–10)	UTPA Fieldhouse (2,308); Edinburg, TX
WAC tournament
03/12/2015; 5:30 pm, WAC Digital	vs. UMKC; Quarterfinals	L 61–70	10–21	Orleans Arena (1,060); Paradise, NV
*Non-conference game. ^{#}Rankings from AP Poll. (#) Tournament seedings in parentheses. All times are in Central.
