= 2014–15 New Mexico State Aggies men's basketball team =

American college basketball season

2014–15 New Mexico State Aggies men's basketball

WAC Regular Season & Tournament champions

NCAA tournament, round of 64
- Conference: Western Athletic Conference
- Record: 23–11 (13–1 WAC)
- Head coach: Marvin Menzies (8th season)
- Assistant coaches: Paul Weir; Keith Brown; Aerick Sanders
- Home arena: Pan American Center

2014–15 WAC men's basketball standings
	Conf.				Overall
Team	W		L	PCT	W		L	PCT
New Mexico State †	13	–	1	.929	23	–	11	.676
Grand Canyon *	8	–	6	.571	17	–	15	.531
UMKC	8	–	6	.571	14	–	19	.424
Seattle	7	–	7	.500	18	–	16	.529
Cal State Bakersfield	7	–	7	.500	14	–	19	.424
Utah Valley	5	–	9	.357	11	–	19	.367
Chicago State	4	–	10	.286	8	–	24	.250
Texas–Pan American	4	–	10	.286	10	–	21	.323
† 2015 WAC tournament winner * ineligible due to transition from NCAA Division II.

The 2014–15 New Mexico State Aggies men's basketball team represented New Mexico State University during the 2014–15 NCAA Division I men's basketball season. The Aggies, led by eighth year head coach Marvin Menzies, played their home games at the Pan American Center and were members of the Western Athletic Conference. They finished the season 23–11, 13–1 in WAC play to win the regular season WAC championship. They defeated Cal State Bakersfield and Seattle to be champions of the WAC tournament. They received an automatic bid to the NCAA tournament where they lost in the second round to Kansas.

== Previous season ==
The Aggies finished the season 26–10, 12–4 in WAC play to finish in second place. They were champions of the WAC tournament to earn an automatic bid to the NCAA tournament. In their 21st NCAA Tournament appearance, they lost in the second round to San Diego State.

== Departures ==
Name	Number	Pos.	Height	Weight	Year	Hometown	Notes
Sim Bhullar	2	C	7'5"	360	Sophomore	Toronto, ON	Left for professional basketball
Kevin Aronis	5	G	6'3"	185	Senior	Sebastopol, California	Graduated
K.C. Ross-Miller	12	G	6'1"	175	Junior	Grand Prairie, Texas	Graduate transferred to Auburn
Matej Buovac	20	F	6'7"	220	Sophomore	Zagreb, Croatia	Transferred to Sacred Heart
Renaldo Dixon	25	F	6'10"	210	Senior	Toronto, ON	Graduated

== Incoming transfers ==
Name	Number	Pos.	Height	Weight	Year	Hometown	Previous school
Anthony January	44	F	6'8"	200	Sophomore	Compton, CA	Junior college transfer from Cerritos College

== 2014 Recruiting Class ==
College recruiting
Name	Hometown	School	Height	Weight	Commit date
Anthony January; F	Compton, CA	Taft High School	6 ft 8 in (2.03 m)	200 lb (91 kg)	
Anthony January; F	Recruit ratings: Scout: Rivals: 247Sports: (89)				
Rashawn Brown; G	Toronto, Canada	Bill Crothers Secondary	6 ft 1 in (1.85 m)	170 lb (77 kg)	
Rashawn Brown; G	Recruit ratings: No ratings found				
Braxton Huggins; G	Bakersfield, CA	Mira Monte High School	6 ft 5 in (1.96 m)	180 lb (82 kg)	May 22, 2014
Braxton Huggins; G	Recruit ratings: (70)				
Harold Givens; G	Norcross, GA	Faith Baptist Christian School	6 ft 7 in (2.01 m)	200 lb (91 kg)	
Harold Givens; G	Recruit ratings: Rivals: 247Sports: (69)				
Jose Campo; F	Riohacha, Colombia	West Oaks Academy	6 ft 11 in (2.11 m)	207 lb (94 kg)	
Jose Campo; F	Recruit ratings: (69)				
Sidy N'Dir; G	Cosne-Cours-sur-Loire, France	West Oaks Academy	6 ft 2 in (1.88 m)	180 lb (82 kg)	
Sidy N'Dir; G	Recruit ratings: (70)				
Eli Chuha; F	Redlands, CA	Redlands East Valley	6 ft 8 in (2.03 m)	217 lb (98 kg)	
Eli Chuha; F	Recruit ratings: No ratings found				
Overall recruit ranking:
Note: In many cases, Scout, Rivals, 247Sports, On3, and ESPN may conflict in their listings of height and weight.; In these cases, the average was taken. ESPN grades are on a 100-point scale.; Sources: "2015 New Mexico State Basketball Commits". ESPN.

== Roster ==
2014–15 New Mexico State Aggies men's basketball team
Players
Coaches

Pos.	#	Name	Height	Weight	Year	Previous school	Hometown
G	0	Travon Landry	6 ft 1 in (1.85 m)	176 lb (80 kg)	So	Huntington Prep	San Antonio, TX
G	1	DK Eldridge	6 ft 2 in (1.88 m)	180 lb (82 kg)	Sr	New Mexico JC; Lincoln High School	Dallas, TX
G	2	Braxton Huggins	6 ft 5 in (1.96 m)	180 lb (82 kg)	Fr	Mira Monte HS	Bakersfield, CA
F	3	Remi Barry	6 ft 8 in (2.03 m)	225 lb (102 kg)	Sr	Del Oro High School	Paris, France
G	4	Ian Baker	6 ft 0 in (1.83 m)	180 lb (82 kg)	So	Arlington Country Day HS	Washington, D.C.
G	5	Matt Taylor	6 ft 5 in (1.96 m)	180 lb (82 kg)	RS Fr	Future College Prep	Toronto, ON
F	11	Johnathon Wilkins	6 ft 10 in (2.08 m)	225 lb (102 kg)	RS Fr	La Lumiere HS	Lille, France
C	15	Tshilidzi Nephawe	6 ft 10 in (2.08 m)	268 lb (122 kg)	RS Sr	Stoneridge Prep	Johannesburg, South Africa
C	21	Tanveer Bhullar	7 ft 3 in (2.21 m)	335 lb (152 kg)	RS Fr	Father Henry Carr Secondary	Toronto, ON
G	23	Daniel Mullings	6 ft 2 in (1.88 m)	170 lb (77 kg)	Sr	Sir Wilfrid Laurier Collegiate Institute	Toronto, ON
F	34	Aaron Kubinski	6 ft 5 in (1.96 m)	195 lb (88 kg)	RS So	La Cueva High School	Albuquerque, NM
G	35	Jalyn Pennie	6 ft 7 in (2.01 m)	180 lb (82 kg)	RS Fr	Christian Faith Center Academy	Toronto, ON
F	43	Pascal Siakam	6 ft 9 in (2.06 m)	230 lb (104 kg)	RS Fr	God's Academy	Douala, Cameroon
F	44	Anthony January	6 ft 8 in (2.03 m)	200 lb (91 kg)	So	Taft High School	Compton, CA
G		Rashawn Browne (redshirt)	6 ft 1 in (1.85 m)	170 lb (77 kg)	Fr	Bill Crothers Secondary	Toronto, ON
F		Harold Givens (redshirt)	6 ft 7 in (2.01 m)	200 lb (91 kg)	Fr	Faith Baptist Christian	Norcross, GA
F		Jose Campo (redshirt)	6 ft 11 in (2.11 m)	207 lb (94 kg)	Fr	West Oaks Academy	Riohacha, Colombia
G		Sidy Ndir (redshirt)	6 ft 2 in (1.88 m)	180 lb (82 kg)	Fr	West Oaks Academy	Cosne-Cours-sur-Loire, France
F		Eli Chuha (redshirt)	6 ft 8 in (2.03 m)	217 lb (98 kg)	Fr	Redlands East Valley	Redlands, CA

Head coach

- Marvin Menzies (UCLA)

Assistant coach(es)

- Paul Weir (York)
- Keith Brown (Pacific)
- Aerick Sanders (San Diego State)

Legend

- (C) Team captain
- (S) Suspended
- (I) Ineligible
- (W) Walk-on
- Injured
- Current redshirt

Roster

== Schedule ==
Date time, TV	Rank^{#}	Opponent^{#}	Result	Record	High points	High rebounds	High assists	Site (attendance) city, state
Exhibition
11/10/2014*; 7:00 pm		Western New Mexico	W 102–39		20 – Siakam	11 – Siakam	–	Pan American Center (2,210); Las Cruces, NM
Non-conference regular season
11/14/2014*; 7:00 pm		at No. 11 Wichita State	L 54–71	0–1	14 – Mullings	6 – Mullings	3 – Baker	Charles Koch Arena (10,506); Wichita, KS
11/18/2014*; 1:00 am, ESPN2		at Saint Mary's; ESPN College Hoops Tip-Off Marathon	L 71–83	0–2	17 – Barry	6 – Mullings	3 – Eldridge	McKeon Pavilion (2,225); Moraga, CA
11/19/2014*; 7:00 pm, AggieVision		Northern Colorado; Wyoming Tournament	W 86–65	1–2	20 – Mullings	8 – Mullings	6 – Mullings	Pan American Center (5,690); Las Cruces, NM
11/22/2014*; 7:00 pm		at UTEP; The Battle of I-10	L 76–77	1–3	17 – Eldridge	9 – Barry	4 – Baker/Mullings	Don Haskins Center (11,127); El Paso, TX
11/24/2014*; 7:00 pm		Stetson; Wyoming Tournament	W 88–68	2–3	17 – Eldridge	17 – Siakam	2 – 4 Tied	Pan American Center (4,884); Las Cruces, NM
11/26/2014*; 7:00 pm		Florida A&M; Wyoming Tournament	W 78–33	3–3	13 – Eldridge/Huggins	9 – Nephawe	5 – Baker	Pan American Center (4,958); Las Cruces, NM
11/29/2014*; 7:00 pm, RTRM/AggieVision		at Wyoming; Wyoming Tournament	L 75–78	3–4	21 – Mullings	9 – Siakam	4 – Eldridge	Arena-Auditorium (5,474); Laramie, WY
12/03/2014*; 7:00 pm, ESPN3		at New Mexico; Rio Grande Rivalry	L 47–62	3–5	13 – Barry	9 – Mullings	2 – Eldridge	The Pit (15,335); Albuquerque, MN
12/06/2014*; 7:00 pm, ASN		UTEP; The Battle of I-10	W 71–64	4–5	15 – Barry	6 – Barry/Siakam	6 – Baker	Pan American Center (8,789); Las Cruces, NM
12/13/2014*; 6:00 pm, ESPN3		at Oral Roberts	L 83–86	4–6	15 – Baker	8 – Pennie	4 – Eldridge	Mabee Center (3,494); Tulsa, OK
12/17/2014*; 7:00 pm, ESPNU		at Baylor	L 55–66	4–7	14 – Barry	5 – Wilkins/Barry	5 – Baker	Ferrell Center (4,787); Waco, TX
12/20/2014*; 7:00 pm, RTRM		New Mexico; Rio Grande Rivalry	L 67–69	4–8	21 – Baker	6 – Siakam	4 – Landry	Pan American Center (8,148); Las Cruces, NM
12/22/2014*; 7:00 pm		Northern New Mexico	W 78–39	5–8	15 – Barry	8 – Siakam	4 – Baker	Pan American Center (4,816); Las Cruces, NM
12/27/2014*; 7:00 pm, RTRM		No. 24 Colorado State	L 57–58 ^{OT}	5–9	14 – Barry	13 – Siakam	4 – Baker	Pan American Center (5,589); Las Cruces, NM
12/30/2014*; 7:00 pm		Texas Southern	W 54–52	6–9	21 – Siakam	9 – Pennie	2 – Baker	Pan American Center (4,981); Las Cruces, NM
01/03/2015*; 7:00 pm		UC Irvine	W 70–67	7–9	23 – Barry	9 – Pennie	3 – Eldridge	Pan American Center (4,903); Las Cruces, NM
01/06/2015*; 7:00 pm, AggieVision		New Mexico Highlands	W 75–67	8–9	16 – Barry	8 – Pennie	9 – Eldridge	Pan American Center (4,749); Las Cruces, NM
WAC Regular season
01/10/2015; 7:00 pm, AggieVision		UMKC	W 63–45	9–9 (1–0)	15 – Barry	12 – Siakam	3 – Baker	Pan American Center (5,707); Las Cruces, NM
01/15/2015; 8:00 pm		at Cal State Bakersfield	W 70–54	10–9 (2–0)	20 – Barry	6 – 3 Tied	3 – Baker/Landry	Icardo Center (1,402); Bakersfield, CA
01/17/2015; 8:00 pm, ASN		at Seattle	L 52–58	10–10 (2–1)	17 – Siakam	10 – Nephawe	5 – Eldridge	KeyArena (2,128); Seattle, WA
01/22/2015; 7:00 pm, AggieVision		Grand Canyon	W 85–63	11–10 (3–1)	18 – Siakam	11 – Siakam	5 – Mullings	Pan American Center (5,577); Las Cruces, NM
01/24/2015; 7:00 pm, ASN		Utah Valley	W 69–44	12–10 (4–1)	14 – Nephawe	11 – Siakam	3 – Barry/Eldridge	Pan American Center (5,878); Las Cruces, NM
01/31/2015; 7:00 pm, AggieVision		Texas–Pan American	W 53–48	13–10 (5–1)	14 – Mullings	10 – Nephawe	4 – Eldridge	Pan American Center (5,892); Las Cruces, NM
02/05/2015; 6:05 pm		at Chicago State	W 69–61 ^{OT}	14–10 (6–1)	16 – Barry	11 – Nephawe	5 – Baker	Emil and Patricia Jones Convocation Center (528); Chicago, IL
02/07/2015; 5:05 pm, ESPN3		at UMKC	W 77–63	15–10 (7–1)	20 – Nephawe	12 – Nephawe	6 – Mullings	Municipal Auditorium (2,937); Kansas City, MO
02/12/2015; 7:00 pm, AggieVision		Seattle	W 73–47	16–10 (8–1)	24 – Siakam	8 – Barry	3 – Nephawe	Pan American Center (5,544); Las Cruces, NM
02/14/2015; 7:00 pm, AggieVision		Cal State Bakersfield	W 74–58	17–10 (9–1)	20 – Siakam	7 – Siakam	5 – Mullings	Pan American Center (5,881); Las Cruces, NM
02/19/2015; 7:05 pm		at Utah Valley	W 51–38	18–10 (10–1)	14 – Siakam	11 – Barry	2 – Mullings/Eldridge	UCCU Center (2,749); Orem, UT
02/21/2015; 7:00 pm, ASN		at Grand Canyon	W 72–55	19–10 (11–1)	18 – Barry	8 – Siakam	5 – Mullings	GCU Arena (7,050); Phoenix, AZ
03/04/2015; 6:00 pm		at Texas–Pan American; Postponed from 2/28/15	W 69–48	20–10 (12–1)	19 – Nephawe	14 – Nephawe	3 – 3 Tied	UTPA Fieldhouse (787); Edinburg, TX
03/07/2015; 7:00 pm, AggieVision		Chicago State	W 61–57	21–10 (13–1)	13 – Nephawe	10 – Siakam	4 – Mullings	Pan American Center (12,572); Las Cruces, NM
WAC tournament
03/13/2015; 7:00 pm		vs. Cal State Bakersfield; Semifinals	W 57–53	22–10	19 – Nephawe	14 – Nephawe	3 – Baker/Wilkins	Orleans Arena (1,723); Paradise, NV
03/14/2015; 9:00 pm, ESPNU		vs. Seattle; Championship game	W 80–61	23–10	21 – Barry	10 – Nephawe	7 – Mullings	Orleans Arena (1,763); Paradise, NV
NCAA tournament
03/20/2015*; 10:15 am, CBS	No. (15 MW)	vs. No. 10 (2 MW) Kansas; Second round	L 56–75	23–11	11 – Eldridge	8 – Siakam/Nephawe	3 – Siakam/Nephawe	CenturyLink Center (16,907); Omaha, NE
*Non-conference game. ^{#}Rankings from AP Poll. (#) Tournament seedings in parentheses. All times are in Mountain Time. (#) during NCAA Tournament is seed with Region MW=Midwest.
