= List of Southern Conference men's basketball champions =

Southern Conference men's basketball tournament
- Conference basketball championship
- Southern Conference logo
- Sport: College basketball
- Conference: Southern Conference
- Number of teams: 10
- Format: Single-elimination tournament
- Current stadium: Asheville Civic Center
- Current location: Asheville, North Carolina
- Played: 1922–present
- Last contest: 2025
- Current champion: Wofford
- Most championships: tied Chattanooga, Davidson (12)
- TV partner(s): SportSouth, ESPN2
- Official website: SoConSports.com Men's Basketball

This is a list of regular season and tournament champions in men's basketball of the National Collegiate Athletic Association (NCAA) Division I Southern Conference.

== Champions by year ==
Season	Regular season champion	Record	Tournament champion	Score	Tournament runner-up	Venue	City
1921–22	Virginia	5–0	North Carolina	40–25	Mercer	Municipal Auditorium	Atlanta, Georgia
1922–23	North Carolina	5–0	Mississippi State	31–21	Chattanooga	Municipal Auditorium	Atlanta, Georgia
1923–24	Tulane	10–0	North Carolina	26–18	Alabama	Municipal Auditorium	Atlanta, Georgia
1924–25	North Carolina	8–0	North Carolina	36–28	Tulane	Municipal Auditorium	Atlanta, Georgia
1925–26	Kentucky	8–0	North Carolina	37–23	Mississippi State	Municipal Auditorium	Atlanta, Georgia
1926–27	South Carolina	9–1	Vanderbilt	46–44	Georgia	Municipal Auditorium	Atlanta, Georgia
1927–28	Auburn	12–1	Ole Miss	31–30	Auburn	Municipal Auditorium	Atlanta, Georgia
1928–29	Washington & Lee	7–1	NC State	44–35	Duke	Municipal Auditorium	Atlanta, Georgia
1929–30	Alabama	10–0	Alabama	31–24	Duke	Municipal Auditorium	Atlanta, Georgia
1930–31	Georgia	15–1	Maryland	29–27	Kentucky	Municipal Auditorium	Atlanta, Georgia
1931–32	Maryland; Kentucky	9–1	Georgia	26–24	Duke	Municipal Auditorium	Atlanta, Georgia
1932–33	South Carolina	3–0	South Carolina	33–21	Duke	Thompson Gym	Raleigh, North Carolina
1933–34	South Carolina	6–0	Washington & Lee	30–29	Duke	Thompson Gym	Raleigh, North Carolina
1934–35	North Carolina	12–1	North Carolina	35–27	Washington & Lee	Thompson Gym	Raleigh, North Carolina
1935–36	Washington & Lee	10–1	North Carolina	50–45	Washington & Lee	Thompson Gym	Raleigh, North Carolina
1936–37	Washington & Lee	11–1	Washington & Lee	44–33	North Carolina	Thompson Gym	Raleigh, North Carolina
1937–38	North Carolina	13–3	Duke	40–30	Clemson	Thompson Gym	Raleigh, North Carolina
1938–39	Wake Forest	15–3	Clemson	39–27	Maryland	Thompson Gym	Raleigh, North Carolina
1939–40	Duke	13–2	North Carolina	43–23	Duke	Thompson Gym	Raleigh, North Carolina
1940–41	North Carolina	14–1	Duke	53–30	South Carolina	Thompson Gym	Raleigh, North Carolina
1941–42	Duke	15–1	Duke	45–34	NC State	Thompson Gym	Raleigh, North Carolina
1942–43	Duke	12–1	George Washington	56–40	Duke	Thompson Gym	Raleigh, North Carolina
1943–44	North Carolina	9–1	Duke	44–27	North Carolina	Thompson Gym	Raleigh, North Carolina
1944–45	South Carolina	9–0	North Carolina	49–48	Duke	Thompson Gym	Raleigh, North Carolina
1945–46	North Carolina	13–1	Duke	49–30	Wake Forest	Thompson Gym	Raleigh, North Carolina
1946–47	NC State	11–2	NC State	50–48	North Carolina	Duke Indoor Stadium	Durham, North Carolina
1947–48	NC State	12–0	NC State	58–50	Duke	Duke Indoor Stadium	Durham, North Carolina
1948–49	NC State	14–1	NC State	55–39	George Washington	Duke Indoor Stadium	Durham, North Carolina
1949–50	NC State	12–2	NC State	67–47	Duke	Duke Indoor Stadium	Durham, North Carolina
1950–51	NC State	13–1	NC State	67–63	Duke	Reynolds Coliseum	Raleigh, North Carolina
1951–52	West Virginia	15–1	NC State	77–68	Duke	Reynolds Coliseum	Raleigh, North Carolina
1952–53	NC State	13–3	Wake Forest	71–70	NC State	Reynolds Coliseum	Raleigh, North Carolina
1953–54	George Washington	10–0	George Washington	83–70	Richmond	WVU Field House	Morgantown, West Virginia
1954–55	West Virginia	9–1	West Virginia	58–48	George Washington	Richmond Arena	Richmond, Virginia
1955–56	George Washington; West Virginia	10–2	West Virginia	58–56	Richmond	Richmond Arena	Richmond, Virginia
1956–57	West Virginia	12–0	West Virginia	67–52	Washington & Lee	Richmond Arena	Richmond, Virginia
1957–58	West Virginia	12–0	West Virginia	74–58	William & Mary	Richmond Arena	Richmond, Virginia
1958–59	West Virginia	12–0	West Virginia	85–66	The Citadel	Richmond Arena	Richmond, Virginia
1959–60	Virginia Tech	12–1	West Virginia	82–72	Virginia Tech	Richmond Arena	Richmond, Virginia
1960–61	West Virginia	11–1	George Washington	93–82	William & Mary	Richmond Arena	Richmond, Virginia
1961–62	West Virginia	12–1	West Virginia	88–72	Virginia Tech	Richmond Arena	Richmond, Virginia
1962–63	West Virginia	11–2	West Virginia	79–74	Davidson	Richmond Arena	Richmond, Virginia
1963–64	Davidson	9–2	VMI	61–56	George Washington	Charlotte Coliseum I	Charlotte, North Carolina
1964–65	Davidson	12–0	West Virginia	70–67	William & Mary	Charlotte Coliseum I	Charlotte, North Carolina
1965–66	Davidson	11–1	Davidson	80–69	West Virginia	Charlotte Coliseum I	Charlotte, North Carolina
1966–67	West Virginia	9–1	West Virginia	81–65	Davidson	Charlotte Coliseum I	Charlotte, North Carolina
1967–68	Davidson	9–1	Davidson	87–70	West Virginia	Charlotte Coliseum I	Charlotte, North Carolina
1968–69	Davidson	9–0	Davidson	102–76	East Carolina	Charlotte Coliseum I	Charlotte, North Carolina
1969–70	Davidson	10–0	Davidson	81–61	Richmond	Charlotte Coliseum I	Charlotte, North Carolina
1970–71	Davidson	9–1	Furman	68–61	Richmond	Charlotte Coliseum I	Charlotte, North Carolina
1971–72	Davidson	8–2	East Carolina	77–75	Furman	Greenville Memorial Auditorium	Greenville, South Carolina
1972–73	Davidson	9–1	Furman	99–81	Davidson	Richmond Coliseum	Richmond, Virginia
1973–74	Furman	11–1	Furman	62–60	Richmond	Richmond Coliseum	Richmond, Virginia
1974–75	Furman	12–0	Furman	66–55	William & Mary	Greenville Memorial Auditorium	Greenville, South Carolina
1975–76	VMI	9–3	VMI	41–33	Richmond	Greenville Memorial Auditorium	Greenville, South Carolina
1976–77	Furman; VMI	8–2	VMI	69–67	Appalachian State	Roanoke Civic Center	Roanoke, Virginia
1977–78	Appalachian State	9–3	Furman	69–53	Marshall	Roanoke Civic Center	Roanoke, Virginia
1978–79	Appalachian State	11–3	Appalachian State	86–83	Furman	Roanoke Civic Center	Roanoke, Virginia
1979–80	Furman	14–1	Furman	80–62	Marshall	Roanoke Civic Center	Roanoke, Virginia
1980–81	Appalachian State; Davidson; Chattanooga	11–5	Chattanooga	59–55	Appalachian State	Roanoke Civic Center	Roanoke, Virginia
1981–82	Chattanooga	15–1	Chattanooga	69–58	Davidson	Charleston Civic Center	Charleston, West Virginia
1982–83	Chattanooga	15–1	Chattanooga	70–62	East Tennessee State	Charleston Civic Center	Charleston, West Virginia
1983–84	Marshall	13–3	Marshall	111–107	Chattanooga	Asheville Civic Center	Asheville, North Carolina
1984–85	Chattanooga	14–2	Marshall	70–65	VMI	Asheville Civic Center	Asheville, North Carolina
1985–86	Chattanooga	12–4	Davidson	42–40	Chattanooga	Asheville Civic Center	Asheville, North Carolina
1986–87	Marshall	15–1	Marshall	66–64	Davidson	Asheville Civic Center	Asheville, North Carolina
1987–88	Marshall	14–2	Chattanooga	75–61	VMI	Asheville Civic Center	Asheville, North Carolina
1988–89	Chattanooga	10–4	East Tennessee State	96–73	Marshall	Asheville Civic Center	Asheville, North Carolina
1989–90	East Tennessee State	12–2	East Tennessee State	96–75	Appalachian State	Asheville Civic Center	Asheville, North Carolina
1990–91	Furman; East Tennessee State; Chattanooga	11–3	East Tennessee State	101–82	Appalachian State	Asheville Civic Center	Asheville, North Carolina
1991–92	East Tennessee State; Chattanooga	12–2	East Tennessee State	74–63	Chattanooga	Asheville Civic Center	Asheville, North Carolina
1992–93	Chattanooga	16–2	Chattanooga	86–75	East Tennessee State	Asheville Civic Center	Asheville, North Carolina
1993–94	Chattanooga	14–4	Chattanooga	65–64	Davidson	Asheville Civic Center	Asheville, North Carolina

=== Divisional format ===
The Southern Conference split into a divisional format for basketball beginning with the 1994–95 season.

Season	Regular season champion (North)	Record	Regular season champion (South)	Record	Tournament champion	Score	Tournament runner-up	Venue	City
1994–95	Marshall	10–4	Chattanooga	11–3	Chattanooga	63–61	Western Carolina	Asheville Civic Center	Asheville, North Carolina
1995–96	Davidson	14–0	Western Carolina	10–4	Western Carolina	69–60	Davidson	Greensboro Coliseum	Greensboro, North Carolina
1996–97	Marshall; Davidson	10–4	Chattanooga	11–3	Chattanooga	71–70	Marshall	Greensboro Coliseum	Greensboro, North Carolina
1997–98	Davidson; Appalachian State	13–2	Chattanooga	7–7	Davidson	66–62	Appalachian State	Greensboro Coliseum	Greensboro, North Carolina
1998–99	Appalachian State	13–3	College of Charleston	16–0	College of Charleston	77–67	Appalachian State	Greensboro Coliseum	Greensboro, North Carolina
1999–2000	Appalachian State	13–3	College of Charleston	13–3	Appalachian State	68–56	College of Charleston	BI-LO Center	Greenville, South Carolina
2000–01	East Tennessee State	13–3	College of Charleston	12–4	UNC Greensboro	67–66	Chattanooga	BI-LO Center	Greenville, South Carolina
2001–02	Davidson; UNC Greensboro; East Tennessee State	11–5	College of Charleston; Georgia Southern; Chattanooga	9–7	Davidson	62–57	Furman	North Charleston Coliseum	North Charleston, South Carolina
2002–03	Davidson; East Tennessee State; Appalachian State	11–5	College of Charleston	13–3	East Tennessee State	97–90	Chattanooga	North Charleston Coliseum	North Charleston, South Carolina
2003–04	East Tennessee State	15–1	Davidson; Georgia Southern; College of Charleston	11–5	East Tennessee State	78–62	Chattanooga	North Charleston Coliseum	North Charleston, South Carolina
2004–05	Chattanooga	10–6	Davidson	16–0	Chattanooga	66–62	UNC Greensboro	McKenzie Arena	Chattanooga, Tennessee
2005–06	Elon	10–4	Georgia Southern	11–4	Davidson	80–55	Chattanooga	North Charleston Coliseum	North Charleston, South Carolina
2006–07	Appalachian State	15–3	Davidson	17–1	Davidson (Tournament)	72–65	College of Charleston	North Charleston Coliseum	North Charleston, South Carolina
2007–08	Appalachian State; Chattanooga	13–7	Davidson	20–0	Davidson (Tournament)	65–49	Elon	North Charleston Coliseum	North Charleston, South Carolina
2008–09	Western Carolina; Chattanooga	11–9	Davidson	18–2	Chattanooga (Tournament)	80–69	College of Charleston	McKenzie Arena	Chattanooga, Tennessee
2009–10	Appalachian State	13–5	Wofford	15–3	Wofford (Tournament)	56–51	Appalachian State	Time Warner Cable Arena	Charlotte, North Carolina
2010–11	Western Carolina; Chattanooga	12–6	College of Charleston; Wofford	14–4	Wofford (Tournament)	77–67	College of Charleston	McKenzie Arena	Chattanooga, Tennessee
2011–12	UNC Greensboro	10–8	Davidson	16–2	Davidson (Tournament)	93–91	Western Carolina	U.S. Cellular Center	Asheville, North Carolina
2012–13	Elon	13–5	Davidson	17–1	Davidson (Tournament)	74–55	College of Charleston	U.S. Cellular Center	Asheville, North Carolina

=== Return to single table ===
Starting with the 2013–14 season, the Southern Conference abandoned the divisional format.

Season	Regular season champion	Record	Tournament champion	Score	Tournament runner-up	Venue	City
2013–14	Davidson	15–1	Wofford (Tournament)	56–53	Western Carolina	U.S. Cellular Center	Asheville, North Carolina
2014–15	Wofford	16–2	Wofford (Tournament)	67–64	Furman	U.S. Cellular Center	Asheville, North Carolina
2015–16	Chattanooga	15–3	Chattanooga (Tournament)	73–67	East Tennessee State	U.S. Cellular Center	Asheville, North Carolina
2016–17	East Tennessee State; Furman; UNC Greensboro	14–4	East Tennessee State (Tournament)	79–74	UNC Greensboro	U.S. Cellular Center	Asheville, North Carolina
2017–18	UNC Greensboro	15–3	UNC Greensboro (Tournament)	62–47	East Tennessee State	U.S. Cellular Center	Asheville, North Carolina
2018–19	Wofford	18–0	Wofford (Tournament)	70–58	UNC Greensboro	U.S. Cellular Center	Asheville, North Carolina
2019–20	East Tennessee State	16–2	East Tennessee State (Tournament)	72–58	Wofford	Harrah's Cherokee Center	Asheville, North Carolina
2020–21	UNC Greensboro	13–5	UNC Greensboro (Tournament)	69–61	Mercer	Harrah's Cherokee Center	Asheville, North Carolina
2021–22	Chattanooga	14–4	Chattanooga (Tournament)	64–63	Furman	Harrah's Cherokee Center	Asheville, North Carolina
2022–23	Furman; Samford	15–3	Furman (Tournament)	88–79	Chattanooga	Harrah's Cherokee Center	Asheville, North Carolina
2023–24	Samford	15–3	Samford (Tournament)	76–69	East Tennessee State	Harrah's Cherokee Center	Asheville, North Carolina
2024–25	Chattanooga	15–3	Wofford (Tournament)	92–85	Furman	Harrah's Cherokee Center	Asheville, North Carolina
2025–26	East Tennessee State	13–5	Furman (Tournament)	76–61	East Tennessee State	Harrah's Cherokee Center	Asheville, North Carolina

== Tournament championships by school ==
=== Current members ===
School	Championships	Championship Years
Chattanooga	12	1981, 1982, 1983, 1988, 1993, 1994, 1995, 1997, 2005, 2009, 2016, 2022
East Tennessee State	8	1989, 1990, 1991, 1992, 2003, 2004, 2017, 2020
Furman	8	1971, 1973, 1974, 1975, 1978, 1980, 2023, 2026
Wofford	6	2010, 2011, 2014, 2015, 2019, 2025
VMI	3	1964, 1976, 1977
UNC Greensboro	3	2001, 2018, 2021
Samford	1	2024
Western Carolina	1	1996
The Citadel	0	
Mercer	0	

=== Former members ===
School	Championships	Championship Years
Davidson	12	1966, 1968, 1969, 1970, 1986, 1998, 2002, 2006, 2007, 2008, 2012, 2013
West Virginia	10	1955, 1956, 1957, 1958, 1959, 1960, 1962, 1963, 1965, 1967
North Carolina	8	1922, 1924, 1925, 1926, 1935, 1936, 1940, 1945
North Carolina State	7	1929, 1947, 1948, 1949, 1950, 1951, 1952
Duke	5	1938, 1941, 1942, 1944, 1946
George Washington	3	1943, 1954, 1961
Marshall	3	1984, 1985, 1987
Appalachian State	2	1979, 2000
Washington & Lee	2	1934, 1937
Alabama	1	1930
Clemson	1	1939
College of Charleston (Note: Now athletically branded as Charleston.)	1	1999
East Carolina	1	1972
Georgia	1	1932
Maryland	1	1931
Mississippi State	1	1923
Ole Miss	1	1928
South Carolina	1	1933
Vanderbilt	1	1927
Wake Forest	1	1953

== NCAA Tournament appearances ==
Year	SoCon Team	Opponent	Result
1939	Wake Forest	Ohio State	L 52–64
1941	North Carolina	Pittsburgh; Dartmouth	L 20–26; L 59–60 (Note: Regional third-place game)
1946	North Carolina	NYU; Ohio State; Oklahoma A&M	W 57–49; W 60–57^{OT} L 40–43 (Note: National championship game)
1950	NC State	Holy Cross; CCNY; Baylor	W 87–74; L 73–78; W 53–41 (Note: National third-place game)
1951	NC State	Villanova; Illinois; St. John's	W 67–62; L 70–84; L 59–71
1952	NC State	St. John's; Penn State	L 49–60; W 69–60
1953	Wake Forest	Holy Cross; Lebanon Valley	L 71–79; W 91–71
1954	George Washington	NC State	L 73–75
1955	West Virginia	La Salle	L 61–95
1956	West Virginia	Dartmouth	L 59–61^{OT}
1957	West Virginia	Canisius	L 56–64
1958	West Virginia	Manhattan	L 84–89
1959	West Virginia	Dartmouth; Saint Joseph's; Boston; Louisville; California	W 82–68; W 95–92; W 86–82; W 94–79; L 70–71
1960	West Virginia	Navy; NYU; Saint Joseph's	W 94–86; L 81–82^{OT} W 106–100
1961	George Washington	Princeton	L 67–84
1962	West Virginia	Villanova	L 75–90
1963	West Virginia	Connecticut; Saint Joseph's; NYU	W 77–71; L 88–97; W 83–73
1964	VMI	Princeton	L 60–86
1965	West Virginia	Providence	L 67–91
1966	Davidson	Rhode Island; Syracuse; Saint Joseph's	W 95–65; L 78–94; L 76–92
1967	West Virginia	Princeton	L 57–68
1968	Davidson	St. John's; Columbia; North Carolina	W 79–70; W 61–59^{OT} L 66–70
1969	Davidson	Villanova; St. John's; North Carolina	W 75–61; W 79–69; L 85–87
1970	Davidson	St. Bonaventure	L 72–85
1971	Furman	Fordham	L 74–105
1972	East Carolina	Villanova	L 70–85
1973	Furman	Syracuse	L 82–83
1974	Furman	South Carolina; Pittsburgh; Providence	W 75–67; L 78–81; L 83–95
1975	Furman	Boston College	L 76–82
1976	VMI	Tennessee; DePaul; Rutgers	W 81–75; W 71–66^{OT} L 75–91
1977	VMI	Duquesne; Kentucky	W 73–66; L 78–93
1978	(3Q) Furman	(1L) Indiana	L 62–63
1979	(6) Appalachian State	(3) LSU	L 57–71
1980	(10) Furman	(7) Tennessee	L 69–80
1981	(11) Chattanooga	(6) Maryland	L 69–81
1982	(10) Chattanooga	(7) NC State (2) Minnesota	W 58–51; L 61–62
1983	(9) Chattanooga	(8) Maryland	L 51–52
1984	(10) Marshall	(7) Villanova	L 72–84
1985	(15) Marshall	(2) VCU	L 65–81
1986	(16) Davidson	(1) Kentucky	L 55–75
1987	(13) Marshall	(4) TCU	L 60–76
1988	(16) Chattanooga	(1) Oklahoma	L 66–94
1989	(16) East Tennessee State	(1) Oklahoma	L 71–72
1990	(13) East Tennessee State	(4) Georgia Tech	L 83–99
1991	(10) East Tennessee State	(7) Iowa	L 73–76
1992	(14) East Tennessee State	(3) Arizona (6) Michigan	W 87–80; L 90–102
1993	(12) Chattanooga	(5) Wake Forest	L 58–81
1994	(13) Chattanooga	(4) Kansas	L 73–102
1995	(15) Chattanooga	(2) Connecticut	L 71–100
1996	(16) Western Carolina	(1) Purdue	L 71–73
1997	(14) Chattanooga	(3) Georgia (6) Illinois (10) Providence	W 73–70; W 75–63; L 65–71
1998	(14) Davidson	(3) Michigan	L 61–80
1999	(8) College of Charleston	(9) Tulsa	L 53–62
2000	(14) Appalachian State	(3) Ohio State	L 61–87
2001	(16) UNC Greensboro	(1) Stanford	L 60–89
2002	(13) Davidson	(4) Ohio State	L 64–69
2003	(15) East Tennessee State	(2) Wake Forest	L 73–76
2004	(13) East Tennessee State	(4) Cincinnati	L 77–80
2005	(15) Chattanooga	(2) Wake Forest	L 54–70
2006	(15) Davidson	(2) Ohio State	L 62–70
2007	(13) Davidson	(4) Maryland	L 70–82
2008	(10) Davidson	(7) Gonzaga (2) Georgetown (3) Wisconsin (1) Kansas	W 82–76; W 74–70; W 73–56; L 57–59
2009	(16) Chattanooga	(1) Connecticut	L 47–103
2010	(13) Wofford	(4) Wisconsin	L 49–53
2011	(14) Wofford	(3) BYU	L 66–74
2012	(13) Davidson	(4) Louisville	L 62–69
2013	(14) Davidson	(3) Marquette	L 58–59
2014	(15) Wofford	(2) Michigan	L 40–57
2015	(12) Wofford	(5) Arkansas	L 53–56
2016	(12) Chattanooga	(5) Indiana	L 74–99
2017	(13) East Tennessee State	(4) Florida	L 65–80
2018	(13) UNC Greensboro	(4) Gonzaga	L 64–68
2019	(7) Wofford	(10) Seton Hall (2) Kentucky	W 84–68; L 56–62
2021	(13) UNC Greensboro	(4) Florida State	L 54–64
2022	(13) Chattanooga	(4) Illinois	L 53–54
2023	(13) Furman	(4) Virginia (5) San Diego State	W 68–67; L 52–75
2024	(13) Samford	(4) Kansas	L 89–93
2025	(15) Wofford	(2) Tennessee	L 62–77
2026	(15) Furman	(2) UConn	L 71–82

- 2020 NCAA tournament was canceled due to COVID-19.

== Television coverage ==
Year	Network	Play-by-play	Analyst	Sideline
2024	ESPN	Brock Bowling	Dean Keener	
2023	ESPN	Anish Shroff	Dean Keener	
2022	ESPN	Tom Hart	Randolph Childress	Erin Summers
2021	ESPN	Roy Philpott	Mark Wise	
2020	ESPN	Mike Morgan	Mark Wise	Erin Summers
2019	ESPN	Tom Hart	Mark Wise	Stormy Buonantony
2018	ESPN2	Tom Hart	Sean Farnham	Stormy Buonantony
2017	ESPN	Jason Benetti	Sean Farnham	
2016	ESPN2	Brad Nessler	Sean Farnham	
2015	ESPN2	Rich Hollenberg	Mark Adams	
2014	ESPN2	Dave LaMont	Bob Wenzel	
2013	ESPN2	Dave LaMont	Bob Wenzel	
2012	ESPN2	Jon Sciambi	LaPhonso Ellis	
2011	ESPN2	Carter Blackburn	Mark Gottfried	
2010	ESPN2	Carter Blackburn	Mark Gottfried	
2009	ESPN	Brad Nessler	Jimmy Dykes	
2008	ESPN2	Eric Collins	Mark Adams	
2007	ESPN2	Dave Barnett	Tim McCormick	

== See also ==
- Southern Conference women's basketball tournament
