= 2014–15 VMI Keydets basketball team =

American college basketball season

2014–15 VMI Keydets men's basketball
- Conference: Southern Conference
- Record: 11–19 (7–11 SoCon)
- Head coach: Duggar Baucom (10th season)
- Assistant coaches: Daniel Willis (10th season); Ryan Mattocks (3rd season); Ben Thompson (1st season)
- Home arena: Cameron Hall

2014–15 Southern Conference men's basketball standings
	Conf.				Overall
Team	W		L	PCT	W		L	PCT
Wofford †	16	–	2	.889	28	–	7	.800
Chattanooga	15	–	3	.833	22	–	10	.688
Mercer	12	–	6	.667	19	–	16	.543
Western Carolina	9	–	9	.500	15	–	17	.469
East Tennessee State	8	–	10	.444	16	–	14	.533
VMI	7	–	11	.389	11	–	19	.367
Samford	6	–	12	.333	13	–	19	.406
The Citadel	6	–	12	.333	11	–	19	.367
UNC Greensboro	6	–	12	.333	11	–	22	.333
Furman	5	–	13	.278	11	–	22	.333
† 2015 SoCon Tournament winner

The 2014–15 VMI Keydets basketball team represented the Virginia Military Institute in the 2014–15 NCAA Division I men's basketball season. The Keydets were led by tenth-year head coach Duggar Baucom and played their home games out of Cameron Hall, their home since 1981. VMI rejoined the Southern Conference after an eleven-year absence, having been a member of the Big South from 2003 to 2014. VMI was a member of the SoCon from 1924 until 2003. They finished the season 11–19, 7–11 in SoCon play to finish in sixth place. They lost in the quarterfinals of the SoCon tournament to Mercer.

On March 28, head coach Duggar Baucom resigned to take the same position at The Citadel. He finished with a record of 151–159 in ten seasons.

== Preseason ==
=== Departures ===
VMI graduated three seniors in 2014, including two of their top scorers, guard Rodney Glasgow and center D. J. Covington. Additionally, on October 29, 2014, head coach Duggar Baucom announced that brothers Ot and Jon Elmore would be withdrawing from the team as well as VMI. Ot was an academic sophomore who was redshirted in 2013–14 and did not appear in a game. Jon was a highly sought-after freshman. Their father, Gay Elmore, who once played at VMI and is currently second on the school's all-time point-scoring list, said in a statement to The Charleston Gazette that the brothers left the school because of a "personal family matter".

Later in the year, shortly following a 63–75 road loss to UNC Greensboro, it was announced that VMI guard and leading scorer QJ Peterson was placed on a medical furlough and would not be attending VMI for the remainder of the academic year. Peterson ended the season averaging 19.6 points per game, but did so on only 34% overall shooting and 27% from the three-point line.

Name	Position	Class	Reason
Rodney Glasgow	PG	Sr.	Graduated
D. J. Covington	C	Sr.	Graduated
Drew Absher	PG	Sr.	Graduated
Ot Elmore	G	R–Fr.	Left school, personal reasons
Jon Elmore	G	Fr.	Left school, personal reasons

=== Coaching changes ===
On May 22, 2014, it was announced that VMI hired Ben Thompson as an assistant coach to the program. Thompson came from UNC Pembroke as an assistant and part of a Brave team that made back-to-back winning seasons from 2011 to 2013, the first time in over twenty years the school had accomplished that feat. He is a 2006 graduate of Virginia Tech. Thompson replaced longtime VMI assistant Jason Allison, who had been with the team since Baucom began coaching in 2005. Allison departed for an assistant coaching job with Appalachian State.

=== Recruiting ===
College recruiting information
Name	Hometown	School	Height	Weight	Commit date
Jon Elmore; PG	Charleston, WV	Christ School	6 ft 4 in (1.93 m)	175 lb (79 kg)	Oct 19, 2013
Jon Elmore; PG	Recruit ratings: 247Sports:				
Armani Branch; SF	Hampton, VA	Genesis Academy	6 ft 7 in (2.01 m)	172 lb (78 kg)	Jan 22, 2014
Armani Branch; SF	Recruit ratings: No ratings found				
Fred Iruafemi; C	Apex, NC	Middle Creek High School	6 ft 7 in (2.01 m)	200 lb (91 kg)	Apr 29, 2014
Fred Iruafemi; C	Recruit ratings: No ratings found				
Overall recruit ranking:
Note: In many cases, Scout, Rivals, 247Sports, On3, and ESPN may conflict in their listings of height and weight.; In these cases, the average was taken. ESPN grades are on a 100-point scale.; Sources: "ESPN – VMI Basketball Recruiting 2014". ESPN.; "2014 Team Ranking". Rivals.

== Roster ==
2014–15 VMI Keydets men's basketball team
Players
Coaches

Pos.	#	Name	Height	Weight	Year	Previous school	Hometown
G	2	Niles Tate (W)	6 ft 0 in (1.83 m)	175 lb (79 kg)	Fr	Thomas Dale	Chesterfield, VA
G	3	Brian Brown	5 ft 11 in (1.8 m)	185 lb (84 kg)	Sr	Kings Mountain	Kings Mountain, NC
G	4	Christian Burton	5 ft 10 in (1.78 m)	170 lb (77 kg)	Sr	Kellam	Virginia Beach, VA
G	12	Michael Donovan (W)	6 ft 0 in (1.83 m)	185 lb (84 kg)	Sr	Western Branch	Chesapeake, VA
F	21	Armani Branch (S)	6 ft 7 in (2.01 m)	172 lb (78 kg)	Fr	Genesis Academy	Hampton, VA
C	5	Fred Iruafemi	6 ft 7 in (2.01 m)	200 lb (91 kg)	Fr	Middle Creek	Apex, NC
F	15	Trey Chapman	6 ft 6 in (1.98 m)	205 lb (93 kg)	So	Wesleyan Christian	Greensboro, NC
G	22	QJ Peterson (injured)	6 ft 0 in (1.83 m)	170 lb (77 kg)	So	Hedgesville/Massanutten	Hedgesville, WV
G	23	Tim Marshall	6 ft 3 in (1.91 m)	185 lb (84 kg)	Jr	Landstown	Virginia Beach, VA
F	25	Craig Hinton	6 ft 7 in (2.01 m)	195 lb (88 kg)	So	East Forsyth	Winston-Salem, NC
F	31	Tyrell Mason	6 ft 4 in (1.93 m)	195 lb (88 kg)	So	Mountain View	Stafford, VA
F	32	Phillip Anglade	6 ft 5 in (1.96 m)	210 lb (95 kg)	Jr	Davidson Day	Long Island, NY
C	34	Jarid Watson	6 ft 7 in (2.01 m)	210 lb (95 kg)	Sr	Springbrook	Burtonsville, MD
G	35	Julian Eleby	6 ft 3 in (1.91 m)	190 lb (86 kg)	So	Village Christian/Fork Union	Fayetteville, NC
F	40	Jordan Weethee	6 ft 6 in (1.98 m)	220 lb (100 kg)	RS Jr	High Point Christian	Greensboro, NC

Head coach

- Duggar Baucom (UNC Charlotte '95)

Assistant coach(es)

- Daniel Willis (Lenoir–Rhyne)
- Ben Thompson (Virginia Tech)
- Ryan Mattocks (Duke)

Legend

- (C) Team captain
- (S) Suspended
- (I) Ineligible
- (W) Walk-on
- Injured
- Current redshirt

Roster

=== Depth chart ===
Pos.	Starting 5	Bench 1	Bench 2
F/C	Phillip Anglade	Jarid Watson	Fred Iruafemi
F	Jordan Weethee	Craig Hinton	Armani Branch
G/F	Tim Marshall	Trey Chapman	Tyrell Mason
G	Brian Brown	Michael Donovan	Niles Tate
PG	Julian Eleby	Christian Burton

== Schedule ==
Date time, TV	Opponent	Result	Record	Site (attendance) city, state
Regular Season
November 14*; 5:30 pm	vs. The Citadel; All-Military Classic	W 66–65	1–0	Christl Arena (1,597); West Point, NY
November 15*; 8:00 pm	at Army; All-Military Classic	L 86–92	1–1	Christl Arena (1,060); West Point, NY
November 18*; 7:00 pm	Johnson University	W 124–42	2–1	Cameron Hall (884); Lexington, VA
November 22*; 7:00 pm	UNC Wilmington	L 93–110	2–2	Cameron Hall (1,897); Lexington, VA
November 26*; 7:00 pm, ROOT	vs. No. 21 West Virginia	L 72–103	2–3	Charleston Civic Center (8,102); Charleston, WV
November 30*; 6:00 pm, ESPN3	at Maryland	L 77–95	2–4	Xfinity Center (8,896); College Park, MD
December 2*; 7:00 pm	Mid-Atlantic Christian	W 133–62	3–4	Cameron Hall (1,072); Lexington, VA
December 4; 7:00 pm	at Samford	W 88–66	4–4 (1–0)	Pete Hanna Center (921); Homewood, AL
December 6; 4:00 pm, ESPN3	at Mercer	L 81–90	4–5 (1–1)	Hawkins Arena (2,327); Macon, GA
December 9*; 7:00 pm	at Navy	L 66–84	4–6	Alumni Hall (578); Annapolis, MD
December 13*; 1:00 pm	Marist	W 92–77	5–6	Cameron Hall (1,048); Lexington, VA
December 22*; 7:00 pm, ESPN3	at Virginia Tech	L 74–87	5–7	Cassell Coliseum (5,326); Blacksburg, VA
December 30*; 7:00 pm	at George Washington	L 60–80	5–8	Charles E. Smith Center (2,828); Washington, D.C.
January 2; 7:00 pm	at East Tennessee State	L 88–98	5–9 (1–2)	Freedom Hall Civic Center (2,373); Johnson City, TN
January 5; 7:00 pm	Mercer	L 75–85	5–10 (1–3)	Cameron Hall (977); Lexington, VA
January 8; 7:00 pm	at Wofford	L 70–75	5–11 (1–4)	Benjamin Johnson Arena (1,970); Spartanburg, SC
January 10; 4:00 pm	at Furman	W 83–73	6–11 (2–4)	Timmons Arena (1,701); Greenville, SC
January 14; 7:00 pm	at UNC Greensboro	L 63–75	6–12 (2–5)	Greensboro Coliseum (1,986); Greensboro, NC
January 17; 1:00 pm	East Tennessee State	W 85–79	7–12 (3–5)	Cameron Hall (2,581); Lexington, VA
January 22; 7:00 pm	at Chattanooga	L 64–86	7–13 (3–6)	McKenzie Arena (3,190); Chattanooga, TN
January 24; 1:00 pm	The Citadel	W 85–75	8–13 (4–6)	Cameron Hall (2,641); Lexington, VA
January 29; 7:00 pm	Western Carolina	L 70–85	8–14 (4–7)	Cameron Hall (1,404); Lexington, VA
February 3; 8:00 pm, ASN	UNC Greensboro	L 56–85	8–15 (4–8)	Cameron Hall (1,690); Lexington, VA
February 7; 1:00 pm	Wofford	L 62–65	8–16 (4–9)	Cameron Hall (2,067); Lexington, VA
February 12; 7:00 pm	Furman	W 93–59	9–16 (5–9)	Cameron Hall (1,078); Lexington, VA
February 15; 5:30 pm, ASN	at The Citadel	W 84–69	10–16 (6–9)	McAlister Field House (4,248); Charleston, SC
February 21; 4:30 pm, ESPN3	at Western Carolina	W 113–111 ^{2OT}	11–16 (7–9)	Ramsey Center (3,060); Cullowhee, NC
February 26; 7:00 pm	Chattanooga	L 82–86 ^{2OT}	11–17 (7–10)	Cameron Hall (1,127); Lexington, VA
February 28; 1:00 pm	Samford	L 69–80	11–18 (7–11)	Cameron Hall (2,536); Lexington, VA
SoCon tournament
March 7*; 8:30 pm, ESPN3	vs. Mercer; Quarterfinals	L 61–89	11–19	U.S. Cellular Center (3,544); Asheville, NC
*Non-conference game. (#) Tournament seedings in parentheses. All times are in Eastern Time.
