= 2014–15 Samford Bulldogs basketball team =

American college basketball season

2014–15 Samford Bulldogs men's basketball
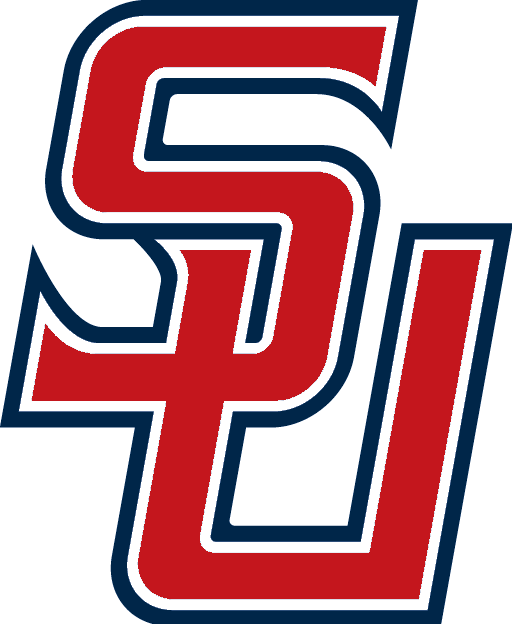
- Conference: Southern Conference
- Record: 13–19 (6–12 SoCon)
- Head coach: Scott Padgett (1st season)
- Assistant coaches: Jake Headrick; Sidney Ball; Charles Newton
- Home arena: Pete Hanna Center

2014–15 Southern Conference men's basketball standings
| | Conf. | | | | Overall |
| Team | W | | L | PCT | W | | L | PCT |
|---|---|---|---|---|---|---|---|---|
| Wofford † | 16 | – | 2 | .889 | 28 | – | 7 | .800 |
| Chattanooga | 15 | – | 3 | .833 | 22 | – | 10 | .688 |
| Mercer | 12 | – | 6 | .667 | 19 | – | 16 | .543 |
| Western Carolina | 9 | – | 9 | .500 | 15 | – | 17 | .469 |
| East Tennessee State | 8 | – | 10 | .444 | 16 | – | 14 | .533 |
| VMI | 7 | – | 11 | .389 | 11 | – | 19 | .367 |
| Samford | 6 | – | 12 | .333 | 13 | – | 19 | .406 |
| The Citadel | 6 | – | 12 | .333 | 11 | – | 19 | .367 |
| UNC Greensboro | 6 | – | 12 | .333 | 11 | – | 22 | .333 |
| Furman | 5 | – | 13 | .278 | 11 | – | 22 | .333 |
† 2015 SoCon Tournament winner

The 2014–15 Samford Bulldogs basketball team represented Samford University during the 2014–15 NCAA Division I men's basketball season. The Bulldogs, led by first year head coach Scott Padgett, played their home games at the Pete Hanna Center and were members of the Southern Conference. They finished the season 13–19, 6–12 in SoCon play to finish in a three-way tie for seventh place. They lost in the first round of the SoContournament to UNC Greensboro.

== Roster ==
| Number | Name | Position | Height | Weight | Year | Hometown |
|---|---|---|---|---|---|---|
| 0 | Nnamdi Enechionyia | Guard/Forward | 6–6 | 175 | Sophomore | Hagerstown, Maryland |
| 1 | Brandon Roberts | Guard | 6–1 | 165 | Sophomore | Decatur, Alabama |
| 2 | Brandon Hayman | Guard | 6–3 | 190 | Senior | Braselton, Georgia |
| 4 | Marcus Johnson | Guard | 5–11 | 185 | Junior | Washington, D.C. |
| 5 | Jamal Shabazz | Guard/Forward | 6–6 | 205 | Junior | Pflugerville, Texas |
| 10 | Christen Cunningham | Guard | 6–2 | 185 | Freshman | Georgetown, Kentucky |
| 11 | Evan Taylor | Guard | 6–4 | 205 | Freshman | Cincinnati, Ohio |
| 13 | Eric Adams | Forward | 6–7 | 185 | Sophomore | Hoover, Alabama |
| 15 | Darius Jones-Gibson | Guard | 6–1 | 175 | Junior | Lexington, Kentucky |
| 24 | Gerald Smith | Guard | 6–4 | 185 | Freshman | Carbon Hill, Alabama |
| 25 | Michael Bradley | Center | 6–10 | 250 | Senior | Chattanooga, Tennessee |
| 33 | Emeka Ikezu | Forward/Center | 6–9 | 230 | Sophomore | Greensboro, North Carolina |
| 35 | Tyler Hood | Forward | 6–6 | 210 | Senior | Lenoir City, Tennessee |
| 55 | Alex Peters | Forward/Center | 6–8 | 210 | Freshman | Mountain Brook, Alabama |

== Schedule ==
| Date time, TV | Opponent | Result | Record | Site (attendance) city, state |
Exhibition
| 11/08/2014*; 7:30 pm | Clark Atlanta | W 92–69 | | Pete Hanna Center; Homewood, AL |
Regular season
| 11/14/2014*; 6:00 pm, BTN+ | at Purdue; Maui Invitational | L 40–80 | 0–1 | Mackey Arena (10,430); West Lafayette, IN |
| 11/16/2014*; 12:00 pm, FS South | at Pittsburgh; Maui Invitational | L 56–63 | 0–2 | Petersen Events Center (8,249); Pittsburgh, PA |
| 11/19/2014*; 7:00 pm | Austin Peay | W 68–67 | 1–2 | Pete Hanna Center (889); Homewood, AL |
| 11/22/2014*; 1:00 pm | vs. Cal State Northridge; Maui Invitational | L 72–79 | 1–3 | Jack Stephens Center (647); Little Rock, AR |
| 11/23/2014*; 4:00 pm | vs. UMKC; Maui Invitational | W 64–55 | 2–3 | Jack Stephens Center (549); Little Rock, AR |
| 11/26/2014*; 1:00 pm, ESPN3 | at Kennesaw State | L 71–84 | 2–4 | KSU Convocation Center (1,027); Kennesaw, GA |
| 11/28/2014*; 8:00 pm, ASN | at Louisiana Tech | L 64–77 | 2–5 | Thomas Assembly Center (4,214); Ruston, LA |
| 12/01/2014*; 7:00 pm, ESPN3 | Jacksonville | W 76–70 ^{OT} | 3–5 | Pete Hanna Center (613); Homewood, AL |
| 12/04/2014; 7:00 pm | VMI | L 66–88 | 3–6 (0–1) | Pete Hanna Center (921); Homewood, AL |
| 12/06/2014; 3:00 pm | at Furman | L 64–74 | 3–7 (0–2) | Timmons Arena (1,251); Greenville, SC |
| 12/14/2014*; 5:00 pm, ESPN3 | at Wake Forest | L 68–86 | 3–8 | LJVM Coliseum (6,973); Winston Salem, NC |
| 12/16/2014*; 6:00 pm | at Presbyterian | W 81–71 | 4–8 | Templeton Center (218); Clinton, SC |
| 12/21/2014; 2:00 pm | Louisiana–Monroe | W 64–50 | 5–8 | Pete Hanna Center (1,053); Homewood, AL |
| 12/28/2014*; 1:00 pm | Campbell | W 65–56 | 6–8 | Pete Hanna Center (589); Homewood, AL |
| 12/30/2014*; 7:00 pm | Auburn–Montgomery | W 94–60 | 7–8 | Pete Hanna Center (474); Homewood, AL |
| 01/03/2015; 2:00 pm, ASN | Wofford | L 65–68 | 7–9 (0–3) | Pete Hanna Center (837); Homewood, AL |
| 01/05/2015; 7:00 pm | East Tennessee State | L 74–76 | 7–10 (0–4) | Pete Hanna Center (624); Homewood, AL |
| 01/08/2015; 6:00 pm | at The Citadel | L 67–77 | 7–11 (0–5) | McAlister Field House (855); Charleston, SC |
| 01/10/2015; 6:00 pm | at Wofford | L 62–72 | 7–12 (0–6) | Benjamin Johnson Arena (1,883); Spartanburg, SC |
| 01/15/2015; 7:00 pm | Chattanooga | L 76–82 | 7–13 (0–7) | Pete Hanna Center (1,363); Homewood, AL |
| 01/17/2015; 3:00 pm | at Mercer | L 56–80 | 7–14 (0–8) | Hawkins Arena (3,672); Macon, GA |
| 01/22/2015; 7:00 pm | UNC Greensboro | W 89–78 | 8–14 (1–8) | Pete Hanna Center (882); Homewood, AL |
| 01/24/2015; 6:00 pm | Western Carolina | W 78–72 | 9–14 (2–8) | Pete Hanna Center (1,231); Homewood, AL |
| 01/31/2015; 6:00 pm | Furman | W 68–58 | 10–14 (3–8) | Pete Hanna Center (1,948); Homewood, AL |
| 02/05/2015; 6:00 pm | at Western Carolina | W 76–72 | 11–14 (4–8) | Ramsey Center (1,319); Cullowhee, NC |
| 02/07/2015; 3:00 pm | at East Tennessee State | W 71–68 | 12–14 (5–8) | Freedom Hall Civic Center (2,715); Johnson City, TN |
| 02/12/2015; 7:00 pm | The Citadel | L 65–66 | 12–15 (5–9) | Pete Hanna Center (786); Homewood, AL |
| 02/14/2015; 5:00 pm | at Chattanooga | L 72–79 | 12–16 (5–10) | McKenzie Arena (3,807); Chattanooga, TN |
| 02/21/2015; 6:00 pm | Mercer | L 61–62 | 12–17 (5–11) | Pete Hanna Center (1,683); Homewood, AL |
| 02/26/2015; 6:00 pm | at UNC Greensboro | L 67–81 | 12–18 (5–12) | Greensboro Coliseum (1,893); Greensboro, NC |
| 02/28/2015; 12:00 pm | at VMI | W 80–69 | 13–18 (6–12) | Cameron Hall (2,536); Lexington, VA |
SoCon tournament
| 3/06/2015; 6:00 pm, ESPN3 | vs. UNC Greensboro; First round | L 76–81 | 13–19 | U.S. Cellular Center (2,299); Asheville, NC |
*Non-conference game. ^{#}Rankings from AP Poll. (#) Tournament seedings in parentheses. All times are in Central Time.
