= 2014–15 Western Carolina Catamounts men's basketball team =

American college basketball season

2014–15 Western Carolina Catamounts men's basketball
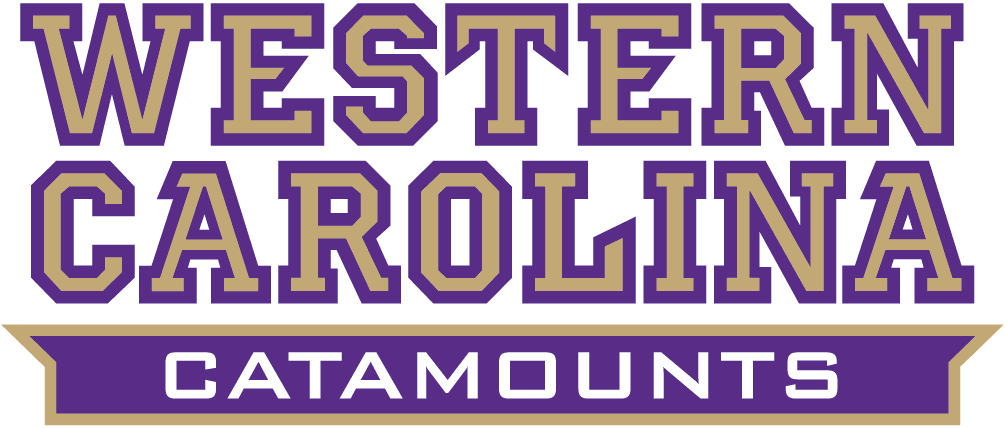
- Conference: Southern Conference
- Record: 15–17 (9–9 SoCon)
- Head coach: Larry Hunter (10th season)
- Assistant coaches: Anquell McCollum; Eric Wilson; Brigham Waginger
- Home arena: Ramsey Center

2014–15 Southern Conference men's basketball standings
	Conf.				Overall
Team	W		L	PCT	W		L	PCT
Wofford †	16	–	2	.889	28	–	7	.800
Chattanooga	15	–	3	.833	22	–	10	.688
Mercer	12	–	6	.667	19	–	16	.543
Western Carolina	9	–	9	.500	15	–	17	.469
East Tennessee State	8	–	10	.444	16	–	14	.533
VMI	7	–	11	.389	11	–	19	.367
Samford	6	–	12	.333	13	–	19	.406
The Citadel	6	–	12	.333	11	–	19	.367
UNC Greensboro	6	–	12	.333	11	–	22	.333
Furman	5	–	13	.278	11	–	22	.333
† 2015 SoCon Tournament winner

The 2014–15 Western Carolina Catamounts men's basketball team represented Western Carolina University during the 2014–15 NCAA Division I men's basketball season. The Catamounts, led by thenth year head coach Larry Hunter, played their home games at the Ramsey Center and were members of the Southern Conference. They finished the season 15–17, 9–9 in SoCon play to finish in fourth place. They advanced to the semifinals of the SoCon tournament to Wofford.

== Roster ==
Number	Name	Position	Height	Weight	Year	Hometown
1	Kenneth Hall	Forward	6–7	210	Senior	Dallas, Texas
2	Mike Brown	Guard	6–3	175	Junior	Charlotte, North Carolina
3	Rhett Harrelson	Guard	5–10	170	Junior	Enterprise, Alabama
4	Torrion Brummitt	Forward	6–7	240	Junior	Columbus, Georgia
5	Devin Peterson	Guard	6–1	171	Freshman	Milton, Georgia
12	Tucker Thompson	Forward	6–9	240	Freshman	Huntersville, North Carolina
23	Justin Browning	Forward	6–4	175	Junior	Sylacauga, Alabama
24	Ashley Williams	Forward	6–5	167	Freshman	Morehead City, North Carolina
25	James Sinclair	Guard	6–3	180	Senior	Savannah, Georgia
31	Aaron Williams	Guard	6–3	188	Freshman	Morehead City, North Carolina
41	Charlendez Brooks	Forward	6–9	270	RS–Freshman	Duncan, South Carolina

== Schedule ==
Date time, TV	Opponent	Result	Record	Site (attendance) city, state
Regular season
11/14/2014*; 6:30 pm	at Mississippi State	L 56–66	0–1	Humphrey Coliseum (6,261); Starkville, MS
11/17/2014*; 9:00 pm, SECN	at Alabama; CBE Hall of Fame Classic	L 74–80	0–2	Coleman Coliseum (8,830); Tuscaloosa, AL
11/21/2014*; 7:00 pm	Hiwassee	W 72–53	1–2	Ramsey Center (1,395); Cullowhee, NC
11/24/2014*; 7:00 pm	at Oakland; CBE Hall of Fame Classic	W 88–79 ^{2OT}	2–2	Athletics Center O'rena (1,631); Rochester, MI
11/25/2014*; 4:30 pm	vs. Georgia State; CBE Hall of Fame Classic	L 70–85	2–3	Athletics Center O'rena (1,377); Rochester, MI
11/26/2014*; 4:30 pm	vs. Chicago State; CBE Hall of Fame Classic	W 66–61	3–3	Athletics Center O'rena (130); Rochester, MI
12/01/2014*; 7:30 pm	at Charleston Southern	L 66–72	3–4	CSU Field House (855); Charleston, SC
12/03/2014; 8:00 pm, ASN	at East Tennessee State	L 89–96	3–5 (0–1)	Freedom Hall Civic Center (4,287); Johnson City, TN
12/05/2014*; 7:00 pm, ESPN3	at Minnesota	L 64–84	3–6	Williams Arena (11,026); Minneapolis, MN
12/16/2014*; 9:00 pm, SECN	at Vanderbilt	L 79–99	3–7	Memorial Gymnasium (7,504); Nashville, TN
12/18/2014*; 7:00 pm, ESPN3	Wright State	L 56–69	3–8	Ramsey Center (671); Cullowhee, NC
12/21/2014*; 2:00 pm	at UNC Asheville	W 66–62	4–8	Kimmel Arena (2,149); Asheville, NC
12/30/2014*; 7:00 pm	St. Catharine (KY)	W 86–70	5–8	Ramsey Center (682); Cullowhee, NC
01/03/2015; 2:00 pm	The Citadel	W 78–70	6–8 (1–1)	Ramsey Center (896); Cullowhee, NC
01/05/2015; 7:30 pm	Furman	W 72–53	7–8 (2–1)	Ramsey Center (617); Cullowhee, NC
01/08/2015; 7:00 pm	at Chattanooga	L 60–66	7–9 (2–2)	McKenzie Arena (2,724); Chattanooga, TN
01/10/2015; 4:30 pm, ESPN3	UNC Greensboro	W 82–72	8–9 (3–2)	Ramsey Center (1,124); Cullowhee, NC
01/15/2015; 7:00 pm	East Tennessee State	L 76–83	8–10 (3–3)	Ramsey Center (1,794); Cullowhee, NC
01/17/2015; 7:00 pm	at Wofford	L 43–62	8–11 (3–4)	Benjamin Johnson Arena (2,012); Spartanburg, SC
01/22/2015; 7:00 pm	Mercer	W 60–52	9–11 (4–4)	Ramsey Center (1,839); Cullowhee, NC
01/24/2015; 8:00 pm	at Samford	L 72–78	9–12 (4–5)	Pete Hanna Center (1,231); Homewood, AL
01/29/2015; 7:00 pm	at VMI	W 85–70	10–12 (5–5)	Cameron Hall (1,404); Lexington, VA
01/31/2015; 5:00 pm	at UNC Greensboro	W 78–73	11–12 (6–5)	Greensboro Coliseum (2,616); Greensboro, NC
02/05/2015; 7:00 pm	Samford	L 72–76	11–13 (6–6)	Ramsey Center (1,319); Cullowhee, NC
02/07/2015; 4:30 pm	Chattanooga	W 73–70	12–13 (7–6)	Ramsey Center (3,063); Cullowhee, NC
02/12/2015; 7:00 pm, ESPN3	at Mercer	W 58–54	13–13 (8–6)	Hawkins Arena (3,501); Macon, GA
02/14/2015; 5:00 pm	Wofford	L 55–75	13–14 (8–7)	Ramsey Center (2,174); Cullowhee, NC
02/17/2015*; 7:00 pm, STO	Cleveland State			Ramsey Center; Cullowhee, NC
02/21/2015; 4:30 pm, ESPN3	VMI	L 111–113 ^{2OT}	13–15 (8–8)	Ramsey Center (3,060); Cullowhee, NC
02/26/2015; 7:00 pm, ESPN3	at Furman	L 49–53	13–16 (8–9)	Timmons Arena (925); Greenville, SC
02/28/2015; 1:00 pm	at The Citadel	W 67–54	14–16 (9–9)	McAlister Field House (1,120); Charleston, SC
SoCon tournament
3/07/2015; 2:30 pm, ESPN3	vs. East Tennessee State; Quarterfinals	W 67–61 ^{OT}	15–16	U.S. Cellular Center (6,051); Asheville, NC
3/08/2015; 6:00 pm, ESPN3	vs. Wofford; Semifinals	L 61–73	15–17	U.S. Cellular Center (5,545); Asheville, NC
*Non-conference game. ^{#}Rankings from AP Poll. (#) Tournament seedings in parentheses. All times are in Eastern Time.
