= 2014–15 UNC Wilmington Seahawks men's basketball team =

American college basketball season

2014–15 UNC Wilmington Seahawks men's basketball

CAA regular season co–champions

CIT, First round
- Conference: Colonial Athletic Association
- Record: 18–14 (12–6 CAA)
- Head coach: Kevin Keatts (1st season)
- Assistant coaches: Casey Stanley; Takayo Siddle; Thomas Carr
- Home arena: Trask Coliseum

2014–15 CAA men's basketball standings
	Conf.				Overall
Team	W		L	PCT	W		L	PCT
William & Mary	12	–	6	.667	20	–	13	.606
UNC Wilmington	12	–	6	.667	18	–	14	.563
Northeastern †	12	–	6	.667	23	–	12	.657
James Madison	12	–	6	.667	19	–	14	.576
Hofstra	10	–	8	.556	20	–	14	.588
Delaware	9	–	9	.500	10	–	20	.333
Drexel	9	–	9	.500	11	–	19	.367
Elon	6	–	12	.333	15	–	18	.455
Towson	5	–	13	.278	12	–	20	.375
College of Charleston	3	–	15	.167	9	–	24	.273
† 2015 CAA tournament winner Rankings from AP poll

The 2014–15 UNC Wilmington Seahawks men's basketball team represented the University of North Carolina Wilmington during the 2014–15 NCAA Division I men's basketball season. The Seahawks, led by first year head coach Kevin Keatts, played their home games at the Trask Coliseum and were members of the Colonial Athletic Association. They finished the season 18–14, 12–6 in CAA play to finish in a four-way tie for the CAA regular season championship. They advanced to the semifinals of the CAA tournament where they lost to Northeastern. They were invited to the CollegeInsider.com Tournament where they lost in the first round to Sam Houston State.

== Previous season ==
The Seahawks finished the season 9–23, 3–13 in CAA play to finish in last place. They lost in the first round of the CAA tournament to Hofstra.

== Departures ==
Name	Number	Pos.	Height	Weight	Year	Hometown	Notes
Chris Dixon	1	G	6'0"	190	Senior	Montgomery, Alabama	Graduated
Ben Eblen	5	G	6'1"	185	Senior	Isle of Palms, South Carolina	Graduated
Tanner Milson	12	G	6'2"	190	Senior	Cedar Hill, Texas	Graduated
Luke Hager	15	F	6'8"	205	RS Sophomore	Chicago	Transferred to Hawaii Pacific
Nate Anderson	22	F	6'9"	235	Junior	Ashville, Ohio	Will not return
Zack Allen	30	G	5'11"	190	Senior	Wilmington, North Carolina	Graduated
Shane Reybold	33	F	6'8"	238	Senior	Laurel, Maryland	Graduated
Marcus Graham	34	G	6'6"	178	Senior	Roseboro, North Carolina	Graduated

=== Incoming transfers ===
Name	Number	Pos.	Height	Weight	Year	Hometown	Notes
Marcus Bryan		F	6'7"	224	Sophomore	Raleigh, North Carolina	Transferred from Charlotte
Chris Flemmings		G	6'5"	175	Junior	Cary, North Carolina	Transferred from Barton College
Jarvis Haywood		G	6'4"	185	Junior	Charlotte, North Carolina	Transferred from Jacksonville
Denzel Ingram		G	6'0"	171	Junior	Chapel Hill, North Carolina	Transferred from Charlotte

Under NCAA transfer rules, Bryan, Flemmings, Haywood, and Ingram will all have to redshirt for the 2014–15 season. Will have three years of remaining eligibility.

== Recruiting Class of 2014 ==
College recruiting information
Name	Hometown	School	Height	Weight	Commit date
Malik Pugh; PG	Dyersburg, Tennessee	Dyer County High School	6 ft 0 in (1.83 m)	155 lb (70 kg)	Feb 17, 2014
Malik Pugh; PG	Recruit ratings: Scout: Rivals: (NR)				
Jordan Talley; PG	Richmond, Virginia	Fishburne Military School	6 ft 0 in (1.83 m)	180 lb (82 kg)	May 7, 2014
Jordan Talley; PG	Recruit ratings: Scout: Rivals: (POST)				
Overall recruit ranking:
Note: In many cases, Scout, Rivals, 247Sports, On3, and ESPN may conflict in their listings of height and weight.; In these cases, the average was taken. ESPN grades are on a 100-point scale.; Sources: "2014 Team Ranking". Rivals.

=== Early Class of 2015 Recruits ===
College recruiting information (2015)
Name	Hometown	School	Height	Weight	Commit date
Mark Matthews; SG	Fort Myers, Florida	Fort Myers H.S.	6 ft 4 in (1.93 m)	175 lb (79 kg)	Aug 24, 2014
Mark Matthews; SG	Recruit ratings: ESPN: (63)				
Devontae Cacok; PF	Riverdale, Georgia	Alpharetta H.S.	6 ft 6 in (1.98 m)	195 lb (88 kg)	Sep 8, 2014
Devontae Cacok; PF	Recruit ratings: Rivals:				
Overall recruit ranking:
Note: In many cases, Scout, Rivals, 247Sports, On3, and ESPN may conflict in their listings of height and weight.; In these cases, the average was taken. ESPN grades are on a 100-point scale.; Sources: "2015 Team Ranking". Rivals.

== Roster ==
2014–15 UNC Wilmington Seahawks men's basketball team
Players
Coaches

Pos.	#	Name	Height	Weight	Year	Previous school	Hometown
G	0	Craig Ponder	6 ft 1 in (1.85 m)	185 lb (84 kg)	RS Jr	Bluefield	Bluefield, West Virginia
G	4	Malik Pugh	6 ft 1 in (1.85 m)	165 lb (75 kg)	Fr	Dyer County	Dyersburg, Tennessee
C	5	Yemi Makanjuola	6 ft 8 in (2.03 m)	250 lb (113 kg)	RS Jr	Tennessee; Word of God	Lagos, Nigeria
G	10	Freddie Jackson	6 ft 4 in (1.93 m)	185 lb (84 kg)	Sr	New Hanover	Wilmington, North Carolina
F	13	Chuck Ogbodo	6 ft 9 in (2.06 m)	230 lb (104 kg)	So	High Point	Enugu, Nigeria
G	14	Jordan Talley	6 ft 0 in (1.83 m)	180 lb (82 kg)	Fr	Henrico	Richmond, Virginia
F	20	Dylan Sherwood	6 ft 9 in (2.06 m)	215 lb (98 kg)	RS Jr	Sutherland	Pittsford, New York
C	23	C. J. Gettys	7 ft 0 in (2.13 m)	275 lb (125 kg)	RS So	Findlay	Findlay, Ohio
G	24	Addison Spruill	6 ft 4 in (1.93 m)	225 lb (102 kg)	Sr	Eastern Florida State College; Pender	Currie, North Carolina
F	40	Cedrick Williams	6 ft 9 in (2.06 m)	225 lb (102 kg)	Sr	Siegel	Murfreesboro, Tennessee
F		Marcus Bryan (redshirt)	6 ft 7 in (2.01 m)	225 lb (102 kg)	So	Charlotte; Ravenscroft	Raleigh, North Carolina
G		Chris Flemmings (redshirt)	6 ft 5 in (1.96 m)	175 lb (79 kg)	Jr	Barton College; Green Hope	Cary, North Carolina
G		Jarvis Haywood (redshirt)	6 ft 4 in (1.93 m)	185 lb (84 kg)	Jr	Jacksonville; Harding	Charlotte, North Carolina
G		Denzel Ingram (redshirt)	6 ft 0 in (1.83 m)	170 lb (77 kg)	Jr	Charlotte; Chapel Hill	Chapel Hill, North Carolina

Head coach

- Kevin Keatts (Ferrum)

Assistant coach(es)

- Casey Stanley (Iona)
- Takayo Siddle (Gardner–Webb)
- Thomas Carr (Pfeiffer)

Legend

- (C) Team captain
- (S) Suspended
- (I) Ineligible
- (W) Walk-on
- Injured
- Current redshirt

Roster

== Schedule ==
Date time, TV	Opponent	Result	Record	Site (attendance) city, state
Exhibition
11/08/2014*; 7:00 pm	Catawba	W 97–68		Trask Coliseum (3,046); Wilmington, NC
Non-conference regular season
11/15/2014*; 7:00 pm	at Old Dominion	L 56–76	0–1	Ted Constant Convocation Center (6,619); Norfolk, VA
11/18/2014*; 7:00 pm	at UNC Greensboro	W 84–72	1–1	Greensboro Coliseum (2,539); Greensboro, NC
11/22/2014*; 7:00 pm	at VMI	W 110–93	2–1	Cameron Hall (1,897); Lexington, VA
11/29/2014*; 2:00 pm	at Davidson	L 49–72	2–2	John M. Belk Arena (3,131); Davidson, NC
12/03/2014*; 7:00 pm	St. Andrews	W 105–47	3–2	Trask Coliseum (3,152); Wilmington, NC
12/14/2014*; 6:00 pm, ESPNU	at No. 4 Louisville	L 57–68	3–3	KFC Yum! Center (20,913); Louisville, KY
12/17/2014*; 7:30 pm	Liberty	W 73–70 ^{OT}	4–3	Trask Coliseum (3,028); Wilmington, NC
12/20/2014*; 7:00 pm	East Carolina	W 66–54	5–3	Trask Coliseum (4,388); Wilmington, NC
12/23/2014*; 2:00 pm	at Campbell	L 63–69	5–4	Gore Arena (1,313); Buies Creek, NC
12/27/2014*; 1:00 pm, BTN	at Minnesota	L 82–108	5–5	Williams Arena (12,711); Minneapolis, MN
12/30/2014*; 7:00 pm	at Ohio	L 53–72	5–6	Convocation Center (5,864); Athens, OH
CAA Regular Season
01/03/2015; 2:00 pm	Hofstra	L 56–68	5–7 (0–1)	Trask Coliseum (3,233); Wilmington, NC
01/05/2015; 7:00 pm	at Northeastern	W 75–68	6–7 (1–1)	Matthews Arena (573); Boston, MA
01/08/2015; 7:00 pm	Delaware	W 74–73 ^{OT}	7–7 (2–1)	Trask Coliseum (2,862); Wilmington, NC
01/10/2015; 7:00 pm	Drexel	W 64–57	8–7 (3–1)	Trask Coliseum (3,643); Wilmington, NC
01/14/2015; 7:00 pm	at William & Mary	L 72–76	8–8 (3–2)	Kaplan Arena (1,873); Williamsburg, VA
01/17/2015; 2:00 pm	at Hofstra	W 79–74	9–8 (4–2)	Mack Sports Complex (1,839); Hempstead, NY
01/21/2015; 7:30 pm, WECT	at College of Charleston	W 58–56 ^{OT}	10–8 (5–2)	TD Arena (3,013); Charleston, SC
01/24/2015; 8:00 pm	Towson	W 69–65	11–8 (6–2)	Trask Coliseum (4,590); Wilmington, NC
01/28/2015; 7:00 pm	Elon	W 82–65	12–8 (7–2)	Trask Coliseum (4,419); Wilmington, NC
01/31/2015; 4:00 pm	at Drexel	L 76–85	12–9 (7–3)	Daskalakis Athletic Center (1,404); Philadelphia, PA
02/04/2015; 7:00 pm	at James Madison	W 77–65	13–9 (8–3)	JMU Convocation Center (3,323); Harrisonburg, VA
02/07/2015; 8:00 pm, ASN	William & Mary	L 53–56	13–10 (8–4)	Trask Coliseum (5,088); Wilmington, NC
02/11/2015; 7:00 pm	College of Charleston	W 58–45	14–10 (9–4)	Trask Coliseum (3,895); Wilmington, NC
02/14/2015; 8:00 pm, ASN	Northeastern	W 66–61	15–10 (10–4)	Trask Coliseum (4,619); Wilmington, NC
02/19/2015; 7:00 pm	at Delaware	L 59–70	15–11 (10–5)	Bob Carpenter Center (2,083); Newark, DE
02/21/2015; 2:00 pm	at Towson	W 73–69	16–11 (11–5)	SECU Arena (1,773); Towson, MD
02/25/2015; 7:00 pm	James Madison	W 74–54	17–11 (12–5)	Trask Coliseum (4,542); Wilmington, NC
02/28/2015; 7:00 pm	at Elon	L 55–74	17–12 (12–6)	Alumni Gym (1,873); Elon, NC
CAA tournament
03/07/2015; 6:00 pm, CSN	vs. College of Charleston; Quarterfinals	W 79–53	18–12	Royal Farms Arena (3,016); Baltimore, MD
03/08/2015; 6:00 pm, NBCSN	vs. Northeastern; Semifinals	L 71–78	18–13	Royal Farms Arena (3,703); Baltimore, MD
CIT
03/18/2015*; 7:30 pm	at Sam Houston State; First round	L 71–87	18–14	Bernard Johnson Coliseum (567); Huntsville, TX
*Non-conference game. ^{#}Rankings from AP Poll. (#) Tournament seedings in parentheses. All times are in Eastern Time.

== See also ==
2014–15 UNC Wilmington Seahawks women's basketball team
