= 2014–15 UNC Greensboro Spartans men's basketball team =

American college basketball season

2014–15 UNC Greensboro Spartans men's basketball
- Conference: Southern Conference
- Record: 11–22 (6–12 SoCon)
- Head coach: Wes Miller (4th season)
- Assistant coaches: Mike Roberts; Jackie Manuel; Duane Simpkins
- Home arena: Greensboro Coliseum; Fleming Gymnasium

2014–15 Southern Conference men's basketball standings
	Conf.				Overall
Team	W		L	PCT	W		L	PCT
Wofford †	16	–	2	.889	28	–	7	.800
Chattanooga	15	–	3	.833	22	–	10	.688
Mercer	12	–	6	.667	19	–	16	.543
Western Carolina	9	–	9	.500	15	–	17	.469
East Tennessee State	8	–	10	.444	16	–	14	.533
VMI	7	–	11	.389	11	–	19	.367
Samford	6	–	12	.333	13	–	19	.406
The Citadel	6	–	12	.333	11	–	19	.367
UNC Greensboro	6	–	12	.333	11	–	22	.333
Furman	5	–	13	.278	11	–	22	.333
† 2015 SoCon Tournament winner

The 2014–15 UNC Greensboro Spartans men's basketball team represented the University of North Carolina at Greensboro during the 2014–15 NCAA Division I men's basketball season. The Spartans, led by fourth year head coach Wes Miller, played their home games at the Greensboro Coliseum, with two home games at Fleming Gymnasium, and were members of the Southern Conference. They finished the season 11–22, 6–12 in SoCon play to finish in a three way tie for seventh place. They advanced to the quarterfinals of the SoCon tournament where they lost to Wofford.

== Roster ==
Number	Name	Position	Height	Weight	Year	Hometown
0	Tevon Saddler	Guard	6–4	207	Sophomore	Aberdeen, Maryland
1	Marvin Smith	Guard/Forward	6–6	190	Freshman	Richmond, Virginia
2	Asad Lamot	Guard	6–1	185	RS–Junior	Mebane, North Carolina
3	Diante Baldwin	Guard	6–0	181	Sophomore	Greensboro, North Carolina
4	Nik Brown	Guard	6–3	200	Sophomore	Washington, D.C.
11	CJ Coleman	Guard	6–3	180	Freshman	Indianapolis, Indiana
13	Kayel Locke	Forward	6–5	240	Junior	Baltimore, Maryland
14	Ben Dickinson	Forward	6–9	230	Junior	Alexandria, Virginia
15	Garrett Collins	Guard	6–5	185	Freshman	Asheville, North Carolina
25	Lloyd Burgess	Center	6–11	270	Freshman	Durham, North Carolina
30	Clay Byrd	Guard	6–0	176	Sophomore	Connelly Springs, North Carolina
31	Nicholas Paulos	Guard/Forward	6–7	185	Senior	Salt Lake City, Utah
32	Jordy Kuiper	Forward	6–9	238	Sophomore	Groningen, Netherlands
33	R.J. White	Center	6–8	280	RS–Sophomore	Frisco, Texas
35	Jamal Mitchell	Guard/Forward	6–4	190	RS–Senior	Charlotte, North Carolina

== Schedule ==
Date time, TV	Opponent	Result	Record	Site (attendance) city, state
Regular season
11/14/2014*; 7:00 pm	Chowan; EMU Showcase	W 76–62	1–0	Fleming Gymnasium (1,835); Greensboro, NC
11/18/2014*; 7:00 pm	UNC Wilmington	L 72–84	1–1	Greensboro Coliseum (2,539); Greensboro, NC
11/21/2014*; 4:30 pm	vs. Longwood; EMU Showcase	L 79–81 ^{OT}	1–2	EMU Convocation Center (680); Ypsilanti, MI
11/22/2014*; 7:00 pm	at Eastern Michigan; EMU Showcase	L 62–70	1–3	EMU Convocation Center (624); Ypsilanti, MI
11/23/2014*; 12:00 pm	vs. Youngstown State; EMU Showcase	L 67–76	1–4	EMU Convocation Center (395); Ypsilanti, MI
11/28/2014*; 9:00 pm, BTN	at Indiana	L 79–87	1–5	Assembly Hall (12,285); Bloomington, IN
12/01/2014*; 7:00 pm	High Point	L 68–76	1–6	Greensboro Coliseum (3,032); Greensboro, NC
12/06/2014*; 2:00 pm	at Presbyterian	W 55–53	2–6	Templeton Center (305); Clinton, SC
12/10/2014*; 11:30 am	Greensboro College	W 82–78	3–6	Greensboro Coliseum (3,652); Greensboro, NC
12/13/2014; 4:00 pm	at East Tennessee State	W 80–79	4–6 (1–0)	Freedom Hall Civic Center (2,375); Johnson City, TN
12/16/2014*; 7:00 pm, ESPN2	No. 24 North Carolina	L 56–79	4–7	Greensboro Coliseum (11,108); Greensboro, NC
12/20/2014*; 2:00 pm	Elon	L 64–71	4–8	Greensboro Coliseum (1,939); Greensboro, NC
12/28/2014*; 2:00 pm, ESPN3	at East Carolina	L 50–71	4–9	Williams Arena at Minges Coliseum (4,418); Greenville, NC
12/31/2014*; 2:00 pm	Mars Hill	W 92–48	5–9	Fleming Gymnasium (979); Greensboro, NC
01/03/2015; 5:00 pm	Mercer	L 55–76	5–10 (1–1)	Greensboro Coliseum (1,943); Greensboro, NC
01/05/2015; 7:00 pm	The Citadel	L 83–85 ^{OT}	5–11 (1–2)	Greensboro Coliseum (1,501); Greensboro, NC
01/08/2015; 7:00 pm	at Furman	L 64–71	5–12 (1–3)	Timmons Arena (813); Greenville, SC
01/10/2015; 4:30 pm, ESPN3	at Western Carolina	L 72–82	5–13 (1–4)	Ramsey Center (1,124); Cullowhee, NC
01/14/2015; 7:00 pm	VMI	W 75–63	6–13 (2–4)	Greensboro Coliseum (1,986); Greensboro, NC
01/22/2015; 7:00 pm	at Samford	L 78–89	6–14 (2–5)	Pete Hanna Center (882); Homewood, AL
01/24/2015; 6:00 pm, ESPN3	at Chattanooga	L 72–82	6–15 (2–6)	McKenzie Arena (4,177); Chattanooga, TN
01/29/2015; 7:00 pm	Wofford	L 42–58	6–16 (2–7)	Greensboro Coliseum (1,630); Greensboro, NC
01/31/2015; 5:00 pm	Western Carolina	L 73–78	6–17 (2–8)	Greensboro Coliseum (2,616); Greensboro, NC
02/03/2015; 8:00 pm, ASN	at VMI	W 85–56	7–17 (3–8)	Cameron Hall (1,690); Lexington, VA
02/07/2015; 1:00 pm	at The Citadel	W 79–63	8–17 (4–8)	McAlister Field House (1,311); Charleston, SC
02/12/2015; 7:00 pm	East Tennessee State	L 62–65	8–18 (4–9)	Greensboro Coliseum (2,035); Greensboro, NC
02/14/2015; 4:00 pm, ESPN3	at Mercer	L 50–55	8–19 (4–10)	Hawkins Arena (3,541); Macon, GA
02/19/2015; 7:00 pm	at Wofford	L 62–77	8–20 (4–11)	Benjamin Johnson Arena (1,755); Spartanburg, SC
02/22/2015; 2:00 pm, ASN	Furman	W 84–49	9–20 (5–11)	Greensboro Coliseum (2,060); Greensboro, NC
02/26/2015; 7:00 pm	Samford	W 81–67	10–20 (6–11)	Greensboro Coliseum (1,893); Greensboro, NC
02/28/2015; 5:00 pm	Chattanooga	L 58–61	10–21 (6–12)	Greensboro Coliseum (3,412); Greensboro, NC
SoCon tournament
03/06/2015; 6:00 pm	vs. Samford; First round	W 81–76	11–21	U.S. Cellular Center (2,299); Asheville, NC
03/07/2015; 12:00 pm, ESPN3	vs. Wofford; Quarterfinals	L 52–70	11–22	U.S. Cellular Center (6,051); Asheville, NC
*Non-conference game. ^{#}Rankings from AP Poll. (#) Tournament seedings in parentheses. All times are in Eastern Time.
