= 2014–15 Chattanooga Mocs men's basketball team =

American college basketball season

2014–15 Chattanooga Mocs men's basketball
- Conference: Southern Conference
- Record: 22–10 (15–3 SoCon)
- Head coach: Will Wade (2nd season)
- Assistant coaches: Casey Long; Wes Long; Brooks Savage
- Home arena: McKenzie Arena

2014–15 Southern Conference men's basketball standings
	Conf.				Overall
Team	W		L	PCT	W		L	PCT
Wofford †	16	–	2	.889	28	–	7	.800
Chattanooga	15	–	3	.833	22	–	10	.688
Mercer	12	–	6	.667	19	–	16	.543
Western Carolina	9	–	9	.500	15	–	17	.469
East Tennessee State	8	–	10	.444	16	–	14	.533
VMI	7	–	11	.389	11	–	19	.367
Samford	6	–	12	.333	13	–	19	.406
The Citadel	6	–	12	.333	11	–	19	.367
UNC Greensboro	6	–	12	.333	11	–	22	.333
Furman	5	–	13	.278	11	–	22	.333
† 2015 SoCon Tournament winner

The 2014–15 Chattanooga Mocs basketball team represented the University of Tennessee at Chattanooga during the 2014–15 NCAA Division I men's basketball season. The Mocs, led by second year head coach Will Wade, played their home games at the McKenzie Arena and were members of the Southern Conference. They finished the season 22–10, 15–3 in SoCon play to finish in second place. They lost in the quarterfinals of the SoCon tournament to Furman. Despite having 22 wins, they did not participate in a postseason tournament.

On April 7, head coach Will Wade resigned to become the head coach at VCU. He finished at Chattanooga with a two-year record of 40–25.

== Roster ==
Number	Name	Position	Height	Weight	Year	Hometown
0	Chuck Ester	Forward	6–7	220	Sophomore	Geismar, Louisiana
1	Greg Pryor	Guard	6–1	195	Sophomore	Memphis, Tennessee
2	Jacolby Mobley	Guard	5–11	169	Junior	Starkville, Mississippi
3	Lance Stokes	Forward	6–7	225	Senior	Orlando, Florida
5	Justin Tuoyo	Forward	6–10	220	Sophomore	Fayetteville, Georgia
10	Martynas Bareika	Guard	6–5	215	Senior	Kėdainiai, Lithuania
11	Ronrico White	Guard	6–3	170	Senior	Knoxville, Tennessee
12	K.J. Bates	Guard	6–1	175	Freshman	Memphis, Tennessee
14	Alex Bran	Guard	6–1	180	Junior	Memphis, Tennessee
15	Eric Robertson	Guard	6–4	200	Junior	Huntsville, Alabama
20	Duke Ethridge	Forward	6–6	225	Junior	Lakeland, Georgia
21	Brandon Maxwell	Guard	6–1	167	Freshman	Orlando, Florida
22	Shaq Preston	Guard	6–3	190	Freshman	New Orleans, Louisiana
23	Tre McLean	Forward	6–5	195	Sophomore	Charleston, South Carolina
24	Casey Jones	Guard	6–5	200	Junior	New Orleans, Louisiana

== Schedule ==
Date time, TV	Opponent	Result	Record	Site (attendance) city, state
Regular season
11/14/2014*; 5:30 pm	Hiwassee	W 110–53	1–0	McKenzie Arena (3,426); Chattanooga, TN
11/16/2014*; 1:00 pm, ESPNews	at No. 3 Wisconsin; Battle 4 Atlantis	L 45–89	1–1	Kohl Center (17,279); Madison, WI
11/18/2014*; 9:00 pm, FS2	at Butler; Battle 4 Atlantis	L 48–70	1–2	Hinkle Fieldhouse (5,409); Indianapolis, IN
11/22/2014*; 7:00 pm	at Tennessee Tech	L 67–69	1–3	Eblen Center (1,276); Cookeville, TN
11/26/2014*; 12:00 pm	Robert Morris; Battle 4 Atlantis	W 61–46	2–3	McKenzie Arena (2,426); Chattanooga, TN
11/27/2014*; 2:30 pm	Coastal Carolina; Battle 4 Atlantis	W 78–67	3–3	McKenzie Arena (2,136); Chattanooga, TN
11/29/2014*; 12:00 pm	at Kennesaw State	L 69–77	3–4	KSU Convocation Center (842); Kennesaw, GA
12/02/2014*; 7:00 pm, ESPN3	Georgia	L 55–86	3–5	McKenzie Arena (3,784); Chattanooga, TN
12/08/2014*; 7:00 pm	Montreat	W 104–50	4–5	McKenzie Arena (2,386); Chattanooga, TN
12/11/2014; 6:00 pm	at The Citadel	W 67–48	5–5 (1–0)	McAlister Field House (1,220); Charleston, SC
12/16/2014*; 7:00 pm	Northern Kentucky	W 93–81	6–5	McKenzie Arena (2,361); Chattanooga, TN
12/19/2014*; 8:00 pm, ASN	at Middle Tennessee	L 58–68	6–6	Murphy Center (4,017); Murfreesboro, TN
12/22/2014*; 8:00 pm, ASN	UAB	W 83–67	7–6	McKenzie Arena (2,609); Chattanooga, TN
12/29/2014*; 7:00 pm	Lipscomb	W 78–60	8–6	McKenzie Arena (2,749); Chattanooga, TN
01/03/2015; 7:00 pm	Furman	W 72–60	9–6 (2–0)	McKenzie Arena (2,738); Chattanooga, TN
01/05/2015; 8:00 pm, ASN	Wofford	L 64–68	9–7 (2–1)	McKenzie Arena (2,927); Chattanooga, TN
01/08/2015; 7:00 pm	Western Carolina	W 66–60	10–7 (3–1)	McKenzie Arena (2,724); Chattanooga, TN
01/10/2015; 4:00 pm	at East Tennessee State	W 74–71 ^{OT}	11–7 (4–1)	Freedom Hall Civic Center (3,605); Johnson City, TN
01/15/2015; 8:00 pm	at Samford	W 82–76	12–7 (5–1)	Pete Hanna Center (1,363); Homewood, AL
01/22/2015; 7:00 pm	VMI	W 86–64	13–7 (6–1)	McKenzie Arena (3,190); Chattanooga, TN
01/24/2015; 6:00 pm	UNC Greensboro	W 81–72	14–7 (7–1)	McKenzie Arena (4,177); Chattanooga, TN
01/29/2015; 7:00 pm, ESPN3	at Mercer	L 72–75 ^{OT}	14–8 (7–2)	Hawkins Arena (3,585); Macon, GA
01/31/2015; 6:00 pm	The Citadel	W 78–73	15–8 (8–2)	McKenzie Arena (4,307); Chattanooga, TN
02/05/2015; 7:00 pm	at Furman	W 74–71 ^{OT}	16–8 (9–2)	Timmons Arena (1,001); Greenville, SC
02/07/2015; 4:30 pm	at Western Carolina	L 70–73	16–9 (9–3)	Ramsey Center (3,063); Cullowhee, NC
02/12/2015; 7:00 pm	at Wofford	W 56–46	17–9 (10–3)	Benjamin Johnson Arena (1,897); Spartanburg, SC
02/14/2015; 6:00 pm	Samford	W 79–72	18–9 (11–3)	McKenzie Arena (3,807); Chattanooga, TN
02/19/2015; 7:00 pm	Mercer	W 74–61	19–9 (12–3)	McKenzie Arena (4,043); Chattanooga, TN
02/21/2015; 7:00 pm, ASN	East Tennessee State	W 67–59	20–9 (13–3)	McKenzie Arena (5,179); Chattanooga, TN
02/26/2015; 7:00 pm	at VMI	W 86–82 ^{2OT}	21–9 (14–3)	Cameron Hall (1,127); Lexington, VA
02/28/2015; 5:00 pm	at UNC Greensboro	W 61–58	22–9 (15–3)	Greensboro Coliseum (3,412); Greensboro, NC
SoCon tournament
03/07/2015; 6:00 pm, ESPN3	vs. Furman; Quarterfinals	L 67–69	22–10	U.S. Cellular Center (3,544); Asheville, NC
*Non-conference game. ^{#}Rankings from AP Poll. (#) Tournament seedings in parentheses. All times are in Eastern Time.
