= 2014–15 The Citadel Bulldogs basketball team =

American college basketball season

2014–15 The Citadel Bulldogs men's basketball
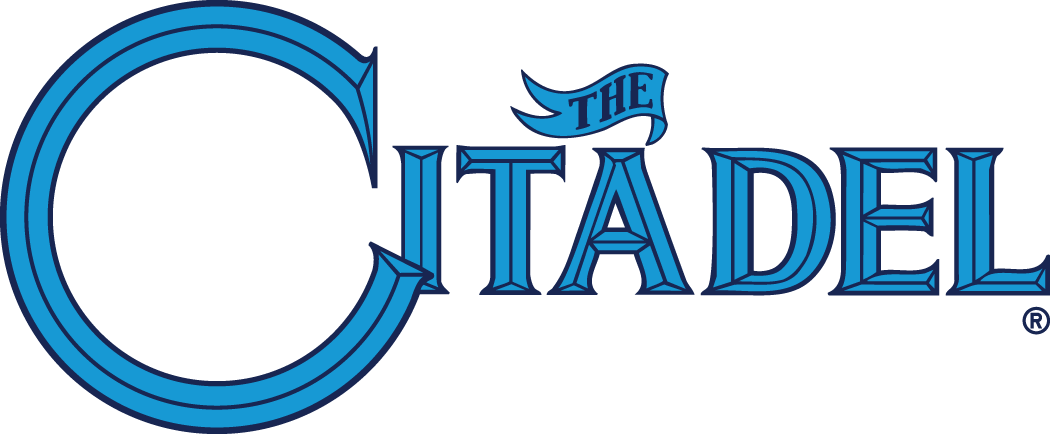
- Conference: Southern Conference
- Record: 11–19 (6–12 SoCon)
- Head coach: Chuck Driesell
- Assistant coaches: Rob Burke; Ryan Freeberg; Andre Morgan
- Home arena: McAlister Field House

2014–15 Southern Conference men's basketball standings
| | Conf. | | | | Overall |
| Team | W | | L | PCT | W | | L | PCT |
|---|---|---|---|---|---|---|---|---|
| Wofford † | 16 | – | 2 | .889 | 28 | – | 7 | .800 |
| Chattanooga | 15 | – | 3 | .833 | 22 | – | 10 | .688 |
| Mercer | 12 | – | 6 | .667 | 19 | – | 16 | .543 |
| Western Carolina | 9 | – | 9 | .500 | 15 | – | 17 | .469 |
| East Tennessee State | 8 | – | 10 | .444 | 16 | – | 14 | .533 |
| VMI | 7 | – | 11 | .389 | 11 | – | 19 | .367 |
| Samford | 6 | – | 12 | .333 | 13 | – | 19 | .406 |
| The Citadel | 6 | – | 12 | .333 | 11 | – | 19 | .367 |
| UNC Greensboro | 6 | – | 12 | .333 | 11 | – | 22 | .333 |
| Furman | 5 | – | 13 | .278 | 11 | – | 22 | .333 |
† 2015 SoCon Tournament winner

The 2014–15 The Citadel Bulldogs basketball team represented The Citadel, The Military College of South Carolina in the 2014–15 NCAA Division I men's basketball season. The Bulldogs were led by fifth year head coach Chuck Driesell and played their home games at McAlister Field House. They played a member of the Southern Conference, as they have since 1936–37. They finished the season 11–19, 6–12 in SoCon play to finish in a three-way tie for seventh place. They lost in the first round of the SoCon tournament to Furman. Driesell was not retained after the season.

== Preseason ==
=== Departures ===
Four players from the 2013–14 team departed the program prior to the season.

| Name | Position | Class | Reason |
|---|---|---|---|
| Matt Van Scyoc | F | Jr. | Transfer to Indiana State |
| Rae Robinson | G | So. | Transfer to Charleston Southern |
| Dylen Setzekorn | F | Jr. | Graduated, Transfer to North Georgia |
| Nate Bowser | F | Fr. | No longer on team, personal reasons |

=== Recruiting ===
College recruiting
| Name | Hometown | School | Height | Weight | Commit date |
|---|---|---|---|---|---|
| Jake Wright; SG | Minneapolis, MN | Hopkins High School | 6 ft 4 in (1.93 m) | 195 lb (88 kg) | Sep 12, 2013 |
| Jake Wright; SG | Recruit ratings: ESPN: (70) | | | | |
| Nadi Beciri; PF | Oradell, NJ | Bergen Catholic High School | 6 ft 7 in (2.01 m) | 240 lb (110 kg) | Apr 14, 2014 |
| Nadi Beciri; PF | Recruit ratings: No ratings found | | | | |
| Tim Broom; G | Jacksonville, FL | Sandalwood High School | 6 ft 0 in (1.83 m) | 200 lb (91 kg) | May 29, 2014 |
| Tim Broom; G | Recruit ratings: No ratings found | | | | |
| Brandon Thompson; PG | Gaithersburg, MD | Covenant Life School | 5 ft 11 in (1.80 m) | 150 lb (68 kg) | Jun 24, 2014 |
| Brandon Thompson; PG | Recruit ratings: No ratings found | | | | |
Overall recruit ranking:
Note: In many cases, Scout, Rivals, 247Sports, On3, and ESPN may conflict in their listings of height and weight.; In these cases, the average was taken. ESPN grades are on a 100-point scale.; Sources: "ESPN – Citadel Basketball Recruiting 2014". ESPN.; "2014 Team Ranking". Rivals.

=== Outlook ===
The Bulldogs were picked to finish 9th by the Coaches and 10th by the SoCon Media in the ten team Southern Conference. Ashton Moore was named to the preseason All Conference team.

== Roster ==
Freshman Nadi Beciri left the team for personal reasons on November 14, 2014.

| Number | Name | Position | Height | Weight | Year | Hometown |
|---|---|---|---|---|---|---|
| 1 | Brandon Thompson | Guard | 5–11 | 150 | Freshman | Gaithersburg, Maryland |
| 5 | Warren Sledge | Guard | 6–3 | 180 | Sophomore | Keller, Texas |
| 10 | Marshall Harris III | Guard | 6–1 | 180 | Senior | San Antonio, Texas |
| 11 | Tom Koopman | Center | 6–8 | 210 | Sophomore | Weert, Netherlands |
| 12 | Ashton Moore | Guard | 6–0 | 172 | Senior | Suffolk, Virginia |
| 13 | Tim Broom | Guard | 6-2 | 195 | Freshman | Jacksonville, Florida |
| 20 | Jake Wright | Guard/Forward | 6-4 | 195 | Freshman | Hopkins, Minnesota |
| 25 | C. J. Bray | Forward | 6–7 | 238 | RS–Junior | Charleston, South Carolina |
| 32 | Brian White | Forward | 6–6 | 195 | Sophomore | Richmond, Virginia |
| 33 | Quinton Marshall | Guard | 6–5 | 205 | Junior | Raleigh, North Carolina |
| 44 | P. J. Horgan | Center | 6–9 | 220 | Senior | Rio Rancho, New Mexico |

== Schedule ==
The Bulldogs again opened the season with the All-Military Classic, facing archrival VMI in the opener. Army hosted the rotating tournament. Navy visited McAlister Field House on December 6, 2014. The Bulldogs traveled to Florida State, Virginia Tech, and Michigan State. Weeknight home games began at 6:00 p.m. in order to facilitate cadet attendance.

| Date time, TV | Opponent | Result | Record | Site (attendance) city, state |
Regular season
| November 14*; 5:30 p.m. | vs. VMI; All-Military Classic | L 65–66 | 0–1 | Christl Arena (1,597); West Point, NY |
| November 15*; 5:30 p.m. | vs. Air Force; All-Military Classic | L 55–68 | 0–2 | Christl Arena (1,060); West Point, NY |
| November 19*; 6:00 p.m. | Toccoa Falls | W 71–58 | 1–2 | McAlister Field House (1,522); Charleston, SC |
| November 22*; 6:00 p.m. | Bob Jones | W 81–50 | 2–2 | McAlister Field House (804); Charleston, SC |
| November 25*; 7:00 p.m. | at Florida State | L 55–66 | 2–3 | Donald L. Tucker Civic Center (5,137); Tallahassee, FL |
| November 29*; 1:00 p.m. | Warren Wilson | W 84–45 | 3–3 | McAlister Field House (878); Charleston, SC |
| December 2*; 7:30 p.m. | at College of Charleston | L 55–59 | 3–4 | TD Arena (3,462); Charleston, SC |
| December 6*; 1:00 p.m., ESPN3 | Navy | W 67–60 | 4–4 | McAlister Field House (1,626); Charleston, SC |
| December 11; 6:00 p.m. | Chattanooga | L 48–67 | 4–5 (0–1) | McAlister Field House (1,220); Charleston, SC |
| December 20*; 1:00 p.m. | at Virginia Tech | L 61–64 | 4–6 | Cassell Coliseum (3,454); Blacksburg, VA |
| December 22*; 6:00 p.m. | at Michigan State | L 56–82 | 4–7 | Breslin Center (14,797); East Lansing, MI |
| December 30*; 6:00 p.m. | Bethune-Cookman | W 51–47 | 5–7 | McAlister Field House (1,007); Charleston, SC |
| January 3; 2:00 p.m. | at Western Carolina | L 70–78 | 5–8 (0–2) | Ramsey Center (896); Cullowhee, NC |
| January 5; 7:00 p.m. | at UNC Greensboro | W 85–83 ^{OT} | 6–8 (1–2) | Greensboro Coliseum (1,501); Greensboro, NC |
| January 8; 6:00 p.m. | Samford | W 77–67 | 7–8 (2–2) | McAlister Field House (855); Charleston, SC |
| January 10; 4:00 p.m., ESPN3 | at Mercer | L 51–74 | 7–9 (2–3) | Hawkins Arena (4,027 (Note: The attendance of 4,027 at Hawkins Arena set a new record at the facility, eclipsing the previous mark of 3,500 set twice in 2013–14.)); Macon, GA |
| January 15; 6:00 p.m. | Wofford | W 69–66 | 8–9 (3–3) | McAlister Field House (1,971); Charleston, SC |
| January 17; 1:00 p.m. | Furman | L 62–74 | 8–10 (3–4) | McAlister Field House (1,426); Charleston, SC |
| January 22; 7:00 p.m. | at East Tennessee State | L 59–70 | 8–11 (3–5) | Freedom Hall Civic Center (2,710); Johnson City, TN |
| January 24; 1:00 p.m. | VMI | L 75–85 | 8–12 (3–6) | Cameron Hall (2,641); Lexington, VA |
| January 31; 6:00 p.m. | at Chattanooga | L 73–78 | 8–13 (3–7) | McKenzie Arena (4,307); Chattanooga, TN |
| February 5; 6:00 p.m. | Mercer | L 53–76 | 8–14 (3–8) | McAlister Field House (1,946); Charleston, SC |
| February 7; 1:00 p.m. | UNC Greensboro | L 63–79 | 8–15 (3–9) | McAlister Field House (1,311); Charleston, SC |
| February 12; 8:00 p.m. | at Samford | W 66–65 | 9–15 (4–9) | Pete Hanna Center (786); Homewood, AL |
| February 15; 1:00 p.m., ASN | VMI | L 69–84 | 9–16 (4–10) | McAlister Field House (4,248); Charleston, SC |
| February 19; 7:00 p.m. | at Furman | W 62–56 ^{OT} | 10–16 (5–10) | Timmons Arena (1,029); Greenville, SC |
| February 21; 7:00 p.m. | at Wofford | L 52–78 | 10–17 (5–11) | Benjamin Johnson Arena (3,008); Spartanburg, SC |
| February 26; 6:00 p.m. | East Tennessee State | W 74–73 | 11–17 (6–11) | McAlister Field House (1,358); Charleston, SC |
| February 28; 1:00 p.m. | Western Carolina | L 54–67 | 11–18 (6–12) | McAlister Field House (1,120); Charleston, SC |
SoCon Tournament
| March 6; 8:30 p.m., ESPN3 | vs. (10) Furman; First round | L 56–73 | 11–19 | U.S. Cellular Center (2,299); Asheville, NC |
*Non-conference game. (#) Tournament seedings in parentheses. All times are in Eastern Time.
