= 2014–15 Southern Conference men's basketball season =

2014–15 Southern Conference Men's Basketball Season
- League: NCAA Division I
- Sport: Basketball
- Teams: 10
- TV partner(s): ESPN, ASN

Regular Season
- Season champions: Wofford
- Season MVP: Karl Cochran
- Top scorer: Jalen Riley

Tournament
- Champions: Wofford
- Runners-up: Furman
- Finals MVP: Lee Skinner

Basketball seasons
- ← 13–14 15–16 →

2014–15 Southern Conference men's basketball standings
	Conf.				Overall
Team	W		L	PCT	W		L	PCT
Wofford †	16	–	2	.889	28	–	7	.800
Chattanooga	15	–	3	.833	22	–	10	.688
Mercer	12	–	6	.667	19	–	16	.543
Western Carolina	9	–	9	.500	15	–	17	.469
East Tennessee State	8	–	10	.444	16	–	14	.533
VMI	7	–	11	.389	11	–	19	.367
Samford	6	–	12	.333	13	–	19	.406
The Citadel	6	–	12	.333	11	–	19	.367
UNC Greensboro	6	–	12	.333	11	–	22	.333
Furman	5	–	13	.278	11	–	22	.333
† 2015 SoCon Tournament winner

The 2014–15 Southern Conference men's basketball season began on November 14, 2014, and concluded in March with the 2015 Southern Conference men's basketball tournament played at the U.S. Cellular Center in Asheville, North Carolina.

Following the previous season's departure of Appalachian State, Georgia Southern, Davidson, and Elon from the league, three new members were added - East Tennessee State, Mercer, and VMI. Both ETSU and VMI had previously competed in the SoCon, as the Buccaneers left for the Atlantic Sun Conference in 2005, while VMI spent eleven years in the Big South. Mercer came from the Atlantic Sun as well. With ten league members, the conference schedule featured a full round-robin with two games against every opponent, totaling eighteen, up from sixteen the previous season.

Wofford, the preseason favorites, cruised through the SoCon regular season with a 16–2 conference record en route to their second straight conference tournament title. Wofford senior guard Karl Cochran was named Player of the Year, while fellow Terrier Lee Skinner was named tournament MVP.

== Awards and honors ==
- Player of the Year: Karl Cochran, Wofford
- Freshman of the Year: Devin Sibley, Furman
- Defense Player of the Year: Justin Tuoyo, Chattanooga
- Coach of the Year: Mike Young, Wofford

=== All–SoCon Teams ===
==== All-Conference Team ====
Name	School	Pos.	Year
Ashton Moore	The Citadel	G	Senior
Jalen Riley	East Tenn. State	G	Senior
Stephen Croone	Furman	G	Junior
Darious Moten	Mercer	F	Senior
Ike Nwamu	Mercer	G	Junior
Casey Jones	Chattanooga	G	Junior
Justin Tuoyo	Chattanooga	F	Sophomore
James Sinclair	Western Carolina	G	Senior
Karl Cochran	Wofford	G	Senior
Lee Skinner	Wofford	F	Senior

==== All-Freshman ====
Name	School	Pos.
Jake Wright	The Citadel	G
Devin Sibley	Furman	G
Christen Cunningham	Samford	G
Daniel Fowler	Furman	G
Stephon Jelks	Mercer	F

== Postseason ==
=== SoCon tournament ===
2015 SoCon Men's Basketball Tournament Seeds and Results
Seed	School	Conference	Overall	Tiebreaker	First round March 5	Quarterfinals March 7	Semifinals March 8	Championship March 9
1	Wofford ‡	16–2	25–6		BYE	#8 UNC Greensboro	#4 Western Carolina	#10 Furman
2	Chattanooga	15–3	22–9		BYE	#10 Furman		
3	Mercer	12–6	17–14		BYE	#6 VMI	#10 Furman	
4	Western Carolina	9–9	14–16		BYE	#5 ETSU	#1 Wofford	
5	East Tenn. State	8–10	16–13		BYE	#4 Western Carolina		
6	VMI	7–11	11–18		BYE	#3 Mercer		
7	The Citadel	6–12	11–18	3–1 vs. UNCG, Samford	#10 Furman			
8	UNC Greensboro	6–12	10–21	2–2 vs. Citadel, Samford	#9 Samford	#1 Wofford		
9	Samford	6–12	13–18	1–3 vs. Citadel, UNCG	#9 UNC Greensboro			
10	Furman	5–13	8–21		#7 The Citadel	#2 Chattanooga	#3 Mercer	#1 Wofford
‡ – SoCon regular season champions. Overall records are as of the end of the regular season.

==== Bracket ====
First round Friday, March 6
8	UNC Greensboro	81
9	Samford	76
7	The Citadel	56
10	Furman	73

Quarterfinals; Saturday, March 7
1	Wofford	70
8	UNC Greensboro	52
4	Western Carolina	67*
5	East Tennessee State	61
2	Chattanooga	67
10	Furman	69
3	Mercer	89
6	VMI	61

Semifinals; Sunday, March 8
1	Wofford	73
4	Western Carolina	61
10	Furman	52
3	Mercer	49

Championship; Monday, March 9
1	Wofford	67
10	Furman	64

* denotes overtime period

=== NCAA tournament ===
Seed	Region	School	Second round	Third round	Sweet 16	Elite Eight	Final Four	Championship
12	West	Wofford	L Arkansas 56–53					
		1 bid	0–1 .000	0–0 –	0–0 –	0–0 –	0–0 –	TOTAL: 0–1 .000

=== College Basketball Invitational ===
Seed	Bracket	School	First round	Quarterfinals	Semifinals	Championship
		Mercer	W Stony Brook 72–70	L UL Monroe 71–69		
		1 bid	1–0 1.000	0–1 .000	0–0 –	TOTAL: 1–1 .500

== Head coaches ==
Will Wade, Chattanooga
Chuck Driesell, The Citadel
Murry Bartow, ETSU
Niko Medved, Furman
Bob Hoffman, Mercer

Scott Padgett, Samford
Wes Miller, UNC Greensboro
Duggar Baucom, VMI
Larry Hunter, Western Carolina
Mike Young, Wofford
