= 2014–15 Mercer Bears men's basketball team =

American college basketball season

2014–15 Mercer Bears men's basketball

CBI, Quarterfinals
- Conference: Southern Conference
- Record: 19–16 (12–6 SoCon)
- Head coach: Bob Hoffman (7th season)
- Assistant coaches: Spencer Wright; Doug Esleeck; Jake Nelp
- Home arena: Hawkins Arena

2014–15 Southern Conference men's basketball standings
	Conf.				Overall
Team	W		L	PCT	W		L	PCT
Wofford †	16	–	2	.889	28	–	7	.800
Chattanooga	15	–	3	.833	22	–	10	.688
Mercer	12	–	6	.667	19	–	16	.543
Western Carolina	9	–	9	.500	15	–	17	.469
East Tennessee State	8	–	10	.444	16	–	14	.533
VMI	7	–	11	.389	11	–	19	.367
Samford	6	–	12	.333	13	–	19	.406
The Citadel	6	–	12	.333	11	–	19	.367
UNC Greensboro	6	–	12	.333	11	–	22	.333
Furman	5	–	13	.278	11	–	22	.333
† 2015 SoCon Tournament winner

The 2014–15 Mercer Bears men's basketball team represented Mercer University during the 2014–15 NCAA Division I men's basketball season. The Bears, led by seventh year head coach Bob Hoffman, played their home games at Hawkins Arena on the university's Macon, Georgia campus and were first year members of the Southern Conference. They finished the season 19–16, 12–6 in SoCon play to finish in third place. They advanced to the semifinals of the SoCon tournament where they lost to Furman. They were invited to the College Basketball Invitational where they defeated Stony Brook in the first round before losing in the quarterfinals to Louisiana–Monroe.

== Roster ==
2014–15 Mercer Bears men's basketball team
Players
Coaches

Pos.	#	Name	Height	Weight	Year	Hometown
F	0	Desmond Ringer	6 ft 9 in (2.06 m)	255 lb (116 kg)	So	McDonough, Georgia
G	1	Phillip Leonard	6 ft 2 in (1.88 m)	200 lb (91 kg)	Jr	Tulsa, Oklahoma
G	2	Matt Panaggio	6 ft 3 in (1.91 m)	185 lb (84 kg)	RS Fr	Daytona Beach, Florida
G	3	Tyre Moore	6 ft 4 in (1.93 m)	180 lb (82 kg)	Fr	Charleston, South Carolina
F	5	Jestin Lewis	6 ft 1 in (1.85 m)	170 lb (77 kg)	Jr	Richmond, Virginia
G	10	Ike Nwamu	6 ft 5 in (1.96 m)	205 lb (93 kg)	Jr	Greensboro, North Carolina
G	11	Jordan Strawberry	6 ft 1 in (1.85 m)	175 lb (79 kg)	Fr	Santa Ana, California
G	12	John Mosser	6 ft 5 in (1.96 m)	210 lb (95 kg)	So	Cary, North Carolina
F	14	T.J. Hallice	6 ft 10 in (2.08 m)	220 lb (100 kg)	Sr	Weddington, North Carolina
F	15	Stephon Jelks	6 ft 6 in (1.98 m)	225 lb (102 kg)	Fr	Marietta, Georgia
F	20	Thomas Massey	6 ft 8 in (2.03 m)	215 lb (98 kg)	Fr	Snellville, Georgia
F	22	Darious Moten	6 ft 6 in (1.98 m)	215 lb (98 kg)	Sr	Bowdon, Georgia
F	23	Demetre Rivers	6 ft 8 in (2.03 m)	180 lb (82 kg)	Fr	Goose Creek, South Carolina
G	25	Lawrence Brown	6 ft 5 in (1.96 m)	210 lb (95 kg)	So	Kansas City, Missouri
F	32	James Bento	6 ft 6 in (1.98 m)	195 lb (88 kg)	So	Houston, Texas
G	34	Jibri Bryan	6 ft 3 in (1.91 m)	185 lb (84 kg)	Jr	Savannah, Georgia
F	52	Niklas Ney	6 ft 10 in (2.08 m)	260 lb (118 kg)	Fr	Berlin, Germany
C	55	Andrew Fishler	7 ft 1 in (2.16 m)	218 lb (99 kg)	Jr	Cumming, Georgia

Head coach

- Bob Hoffman (Oklahoma Baptist)

Assistant coach(es)

- Spencer Wright (Central Oklahoma)
- Doug Esleeck (North Carolina)
- Jake Nelp (Colorado State)

Legend

- (C) Team captain
- (S) Suspended
- (I) Ineligible
- (W) Walk-on
- Injured
- Current redshirt

== Schedule ==
Date time, TV	Opponent	Result	Record	Site (attendance) city, state
Regular season
11/14/2014*; 7:00 pm, ESPN3	Piedmont	W 88–48	1–0	Hawkins Arena (3,500); Macon, GA
11/16/2014*; 12:00 pm	at Seton Hall	L 47–63	1–1	Prudential Center (7,075); Newark, NJ
11/19/2014*; 7:00 pm, ESPN3	Kennesaw State	W 74–66	2–1	Hawkins Arena (2,647); Macon, GA
11/23/2014*; 6:00 pm	at Colorado State; Great Alaska Shootout	L 62–75	2–2	Moby Arena (2,675); Fort Collins, CO
11/27/2014*; 9:30 pm, CBSSN	vs. Rice; Great Alaska Shootout quarterfinals	W 77–71 ^{OT}	3–2	Alaska Airlines Center (2,366); Anchorage, AK
11/28/2014*; 11:59 pm, CBSSN	vs. UC Santa Barbara; Great Alaska Shootout semifinals	L 60–66 ^{OT}	3–3	Alaska Airlines Center (3,224); Anchorage, AK
11/29/2014*; 9:00 pm, CBSSN	vs. Pacific; Great Alaska Shootout 3rd place game	L 48–55	3–4	Alaska Airlines Center (3,110); Anchorage, AK
12/02/2014*; 7:00 pm, ESPN3	St. Andrews	W 62–33	4–4	Hawkins Arena (1,527); Macon, GA
12/06/2014; 4:00 pm, ESPN3	VMI	W 90–81	5–4 (1–0)	Hawkins Arena (2,327); Macon, GA
12/16/2014*; 7:00 pm, ESPN3	Dartmouth	L 51–67	5–5	Hawkins Arena (2,430); Macon, GA
12/19/2014*; 7:00 pm, ESPN3	Bethune-Cookman	W 67–46	6–5	Hawkins Arena (2,487); Macon, GA
12/22/2014*; 7:00 pm, SECN	at Tennessee	L 54–64	6–6	Thompson–Boling Arena (13,093); Knoxville, TN
12/27/2014*; 7:00 pm, SECN	at Georgia	L 77–86 ^{3OT}	6–7	Stegeman Coliseum (8,047); Athens, GA
12/30/2014*; 8:00 pm, SECN	at Texas A&M	L 50–65	6–8	Reed Arena (7,052); College Station, TX
01/03/2015; 5:00 pm	at UNC Greensboro	W 76–55	7–8 (2–0)	Greensboro Coliseum (1,943); Greensboro, NC
01/05/2015; 7:00 pm	at VMI	W 85–75	8–8 (3–0)	Cameron Hall (977); Lexington, VA
01/08/2015; 7:00 pm	at East Tennessee State	L 70–71	8–9 (3–1)	Freedom Hall Civic Center (2,621); Johnson City, TN
01/10/2015; 4:00 pm, ESPN3	The Citadel	W 74–51	9–9 (4–1)	Hawkins Arena (4,027 (Note: The attendance of 4,027 at Hawkins Arena set a new record at the facility, eclipsing the previous mark of 3,500 set twice in 2013–14.)); Macon, GA
01/15/2015; 7:00 pm, ESPN3	Furman	W 67–64	10–9 (5–1)	Hawkins Arena (2,718); Macon, GA
01/17/2015; 7:00 pm, ESPN3	Samford	W 80–56	11–9 (6–1)	Hawkins Arena (3,672); Macon, GA
01/22/2015; 7:00 pm	at Western Carolina	L 52–60	11–10 (6–2)	Ramsey Center (1,839); Cullowhee, NC
01/29/2015; 7:00 pm, ESPN3	Chattanooga	W 75–72 ^{OT}	12–10 (7–2)	Hawkins Arena (3,585); Macon, GA
01/31/2015; 7:00 pm, ESPN3	at Wofford	L 46–49	12–11 (7–3)	Benjamin Johnson Arena (3,036); Spartanburg, SC
02/05/2015; 6:00 pm	at The Citadel	W 76–53	13–11 (8–3)	McAlister Field House (1,946); Charleston, SC
02/07/2015; 4:00 pm, ESPN3	at Furman	W 74–68	14–11 (9–3)	Timmons Arena (1,877); Greenville, SC
02/12/2015; 7:00 pm, ESPN3	Western Carolina	L 54–58	14–12 (9–4)	Hawkins Arena (3,501); Macon, GA
02/14/2015; 4:00 pm, ESPN3	UNC Greensboro	W 55–50	15–12 (10–4)	Hawkins Arena (3,541); Macon, GA
02/19/2015; 7:00 pm	at Chattanooga	L 61–74	15–13 (10–5)	McKenzie Arena (4,043); Chattanooga, TN
02/21/2015; 7:00 pm	at Samford	W 62–61	16–13 (11–5)	Pete Hanna Center (1,683); Homewood, AL
02/26/2015; 7:00 pm, ESPN3	Wofford	L 72–76	16–14 (11–6)	Hawkins Arena (3,870); Macon, GA
02/28/2015; 4:00 pm, ESPN3	East Tennessee State	W 69–64	17–14 (12–6)	Hawkins Arena (3,817); Macon, GA
SoCon tournament
03/07/2015; 8:30 pm, ESPN3	vs. VMI; Quarterfinals	W 89–61	18–14	U.S. Cellular Center (3,544); Asheville, NC
03/08/2015; 8:30 pm, ESPN3	vs. Furman; Quarterfinals	L 49–52	18–15	U.S. Cellular Center (5,545); Asheville, NC
College Basketball Invitational
03/18/2015*; 7:00 pm	Stony Brook; First round	W 72–70	19–15	Hawkins Arena (2,432); Macon, GA
03/23/2015*; 7:00 pm, ESPN3	Louisiana–Monroe; Quarterfinals	L 69–71	19–16	Hawkins Arena (2,677); Macon, GA
*Non-conference game. ^{#}Rankings from AP Poll. (#) Tournament seedings in parentheses. All times are in Eastern Time.
