= 2014–15 Furman Paladins men's basketball team =

American college basketball season

2014–15 Furman Paladins men's basketball
- Conference: Southern Conference
- Record: 11–22 (5–13 SoCon)
- Head coach: Niko Medved (2nd season)
- Assistant coaches: Bob Richey; Jay McAuley; Dwight Perry
- Home arena: Timmons Arena

2014–15 Southern Conference men's basketball standings
	Conf.				Overall
Team	W		L	PCT	W		L	PCT
Wofford †	16	–	2	.889	28	–	7	.800
Chattanooga	15	–	3	.833	22	–	10	.688
Mercer	12	–	6	.667	19	–	16	.543
Western Carolina	9	–	9	.500	15	–	17	.469
East Tennessee State	8	–	10	.444	16	–	14	.533
VMI	7	–	11	.389	11	–	19	.367
Samford	6	–	12	.333	13	–	19	.406
The Citadel	6	–	12	.333	11	–	19	.367
UNC Greensboro	6	–	12	.333	11	–	22	.333
Furman	5	–	13	.278	11	–	22	.333
† 2015 SoCon Tournament winner

The 2014–15 Furman Paladins men's basketball team represented Furman University during the 2014–15 NCAA Division I men's basketball season. The Paladins, led by second year head coach Niko Medved, played their home games at Timmons Arena and were members of the Southern Conference.

After going just 5–13 in conference play to finish in last place, the Paladins won three games in the Southern Conference tournament before losing by 3 points in the finals to top-seeded Wofford. The team finished the season 11–22 overall.

== Roster ==
Number	Name	Position	Height	Weight	Year	Hometown
1	John Davis III	Guard	5–10	160	Freshman	Beachwood, Ohio
3	Geoff Beans	Forward	6–7	210	Freshman	Toledo, Ohio
4	T. K. Hayes	Guard	6–1	175	Sophomore	Chester, New Jersey
5	Aaron O'Neill	Guard	6–0	180	Junior	Cincinnati, Ohio
10	Gene Langan	Forward	6–6	195	Freshman	Greenville, South Carolina
12	Devin Sibley	Guard	6–2	175	Freshman	Knoxville, Tennessee
14	Stephen Croone	Guard	6–0	170	Junior	Covington, Georgia
15	Isaiah Watkins	Forward	6–8	220	Sophomore	Toronto, Ontario, Canada
21	Kris Acox	Forward	6–6	215	Sophomore	Reykjavík, Iceland
22	William Gates Jr.	Guard	6–1	180	Sophomore	Schertz, Texas
24	Larry Wideman	Guard	6–4	190	Junior	Loris, South Carolina
30	Kendrec Ferrara	Forward	6–9	235	Junior	Cape Coral, Florida
35	Daniel Fowler	Guard	6–4	195	Freshman	Acworth, Georgia
42	Kevin Chuisseu	Forward	6–8	230	Junior	Douala, Cameroon

== Schedule ==
Date time, TV	Opponent	Result	Record	Site (attendance) city, state
Exhibition
11/08/2014*; 1:00 pm	North Greenville	W 64–60		Timmons Arena; Greenville, SC
Regular season
11/14/2014*; 8:00 pm	College of Charleston	L 40–75	0–1	Timmons Arena (1,242); Greenville, SC
11/19/2014*; 7:00 pm	Appalachian State	W 84–65	1–1	Timmons Arena (1,003); Greenville, SC
11/22/2014*; 7:30 pm	UC Davis	L 55–58	1–2	Timmons Arena (913); Greenville, SC
11/26/2014*; 5:00 pm, ESPNU	at No. 4 Duke	L 54–93	1–3	Cameron Indoor Stadium (9,314); Durham, NC
12/01/2014*; 7:00 pm, ESPN3	at Liberty	L 52–66	1–4	Vines Center (1,630); Lynchburg, VA
12/06/2014; 4:00 pm	Samford	W 74–64	2–4 (1–0)	Timmons Arena (1,251); Greenville, SC
12/09/2014*; 8:00 pm	at TCU	L 69–80	2–5	Wilkerson-Greines Activity Center (3,548); Fort Worth, TX
12/13/2014*; 7:00 pm	at Gardner–Webb	L 68–74	2–6	Paul Porter Arena (1,281); Boiling Springs, NC
12/19/2014*; 7:30 pm	at Florida Gulf Coast	L 78–83	2–7	Alico Arena (4,251); Fort Myers, FL
12/22/2014*; 8:00 pm, ESPN3	at Minnesota	L 76–86	2–8	Williams Arena (12,287); Minneapolis, MN
12/30/2014*; 6:00 pm	St. Andrews	W 72–35	3–8	Timmons Arena (887); Greenville, SC
01/03/2015; 7:00 pm	at Chattanooga	L 60–72	3–9 (1–1)	McKenzie Arena (2,738); Chattanooga, TN
01/05/2015; 7:30 pm	at Western Carolina	L 53–72	3–10 (1–2)	Ramsey Center (617); Cullowhee, NC
01/08/2015*; 7:00 pm	UNC Greensboro	W 71–64	4–10 (2–2)	Timmons Arena (813); Greenville, SC
01/10/2015*; 4:00 pm	VMI	L 73–83	4–11 (2–3)	Timmons Arena (1,701); Greenville, SC
01/15/2015; 7:00 pm, ESPN3	at Mercer	L 64–67	4–12 (2–4)	Hawkins Arena (2,718); Macon, GA
01/17/2015; 1:00 pm	at The Citadel	W 74–62	5–12 (3–4)	McAlister Field House (1,426); Charleston, SC
01/22/2015; 7:00 pm	at Wofford	L 49–74	5–13 (3–5)	Benjamin Johnson Arena (1,812); Spartanburg, SC
01/24/2015*; 1:00 pm	Allen	W 82–46	6–13	Timmons Arena (921); Greenville, SC
01/29/2015; 7:00 pm	East Tennessee State	W 59–55	7–13 (4–5)	Timmons Arena (1,005); Greenville, SC
01/31/2015; 8:00 pm	at Samford	L 58–68	7–14 (4–6)	Pete Hanna Center (1,948); Homewood, AL
02/05/2015; 7:00 pm	Chattanooga	L 71–74 ^{OT}	7–15 (4–7)	Timmons Arena (1,001); Greenville, SC
02/07/2015; 4:00 pm, ESPN3	Mercer	L 68–74	7–16 (4–8)	Timmons Arena (1,877); Greenville, SC
02/12/2015; 7:00 pm	at VMI	L 59–93	7–17 (4–9)	Cameron Hall (1,078); Lexington, VA
02/14/2015; 4:00 pm, ESPN3	at East Tennessee State	L 59–66	7–18 (4–10)	Freedom Hall Civic Center (2,658); Johnson City, TN
02/19/2015; 7:00 pm	The Citadel	L 56–62 ^{OT}	7–19 (4–11)	Timmons Arena (1,029); Greenville, SC
02/22/2015; 2:00 pm, ASN	at UNC Greensboro	L 49–84	7–20 (4–12)	Greensboro Coliseum (2,060); Greensboro, NC
02/26/2015; 7:00 pm, ESPN3	Western Carolina	W 53–49	8–20 (5–12)	Timmons Arena (925); Greenville, SC
02/28/2015; 4:00 pm	Wofford	L 60–62	8–21 (5–13)	Timmons Arena (2,202); Greenville, SC
SoCon tournament
3/06/2015; 8:30 pm, ESPN3	vs. The Citadel; First round	W 73–56	9–21	U.S. Cellular Center (2,299); Asheville, NC
3/07/2015; 6:00 pm, ESPN3	vs. Chattanooga; Quarterfinals	W 69–67	10–21	U.S. Cellular Center (3,544); Asheville, NC
3/08/2015; 8:30 pm, ESPN3	vs. Mercer; Semifinals	W 52–49	11–21	U.S. Cellular Center (5,545); Asheville, NC
3/09/2015; 7:00 pm, ESPN2	vs. Wofford; Championship game	L 64–67	11–22	U.S. Cellular Center (5,153); Asheville, NC
*Non-conference game. ^{#}Rankings from AP Poll. (#) Tournament seedings in parentheses. All times are in Eastern Time.
