= Mike Young (basketball) =

American basketball coach (born 1963)

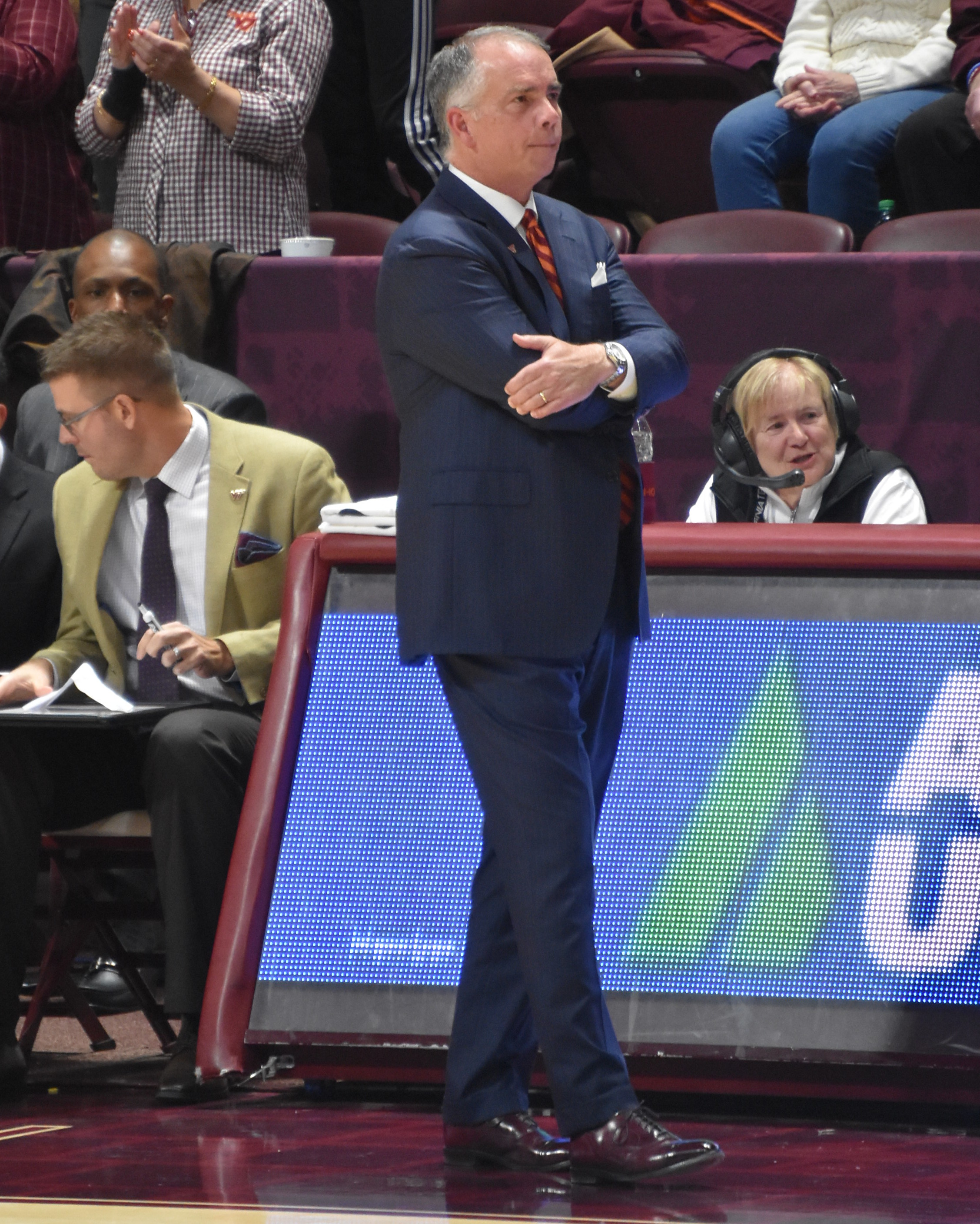
- Young in 2019

Current position
- Title: Head coach
- Team: Virginia Tech
- Conference: ACC
- Record: 130–99 (.568)

Biographical details
- Born: May 1, 1963 (age 63); Radford, Virginia, U.S.

Playing career
- 1982–1986: Emory & Henry

Coaching career (HC unless noted)
- 1986–1988: Emory & Henry (assistant)
- 1988–1989: Radford (assistant)
- 1989–2002: Wofford (assistant)
- 2002–2019: Wofford
- 2019–present: Virginia Tech

Head coaching record
- Overall: 429–343 (.556)
- Tournaments: 1–7 (NCAA Division I); 1–2 (NIT); 0–1 (CBI); 0–1 (CIT)

Accomplishments and honors

Championships
- 4 SoCon regular season (2010, 2011, 2015, 2019); 5 SoCon tournament (2010, 2011, 2014, 2015, 2019); ACC tournament (2022)

Awards
- Hugh Durham Award (2010); Sporting News Men's College Basketball Coach of the Year Award (2019); 4× SoCon Coach of the Year (2010, 2014, 2015, 2019); ACC Coach of the Year (2021)

Michael Kent Young (born May 1, 1963) is an American college basketball coach and currently the head men's basketball coach at Virginia Tech. He was hired on April 7, 2019, after a 17-year stint where he went 299–244 (.545) as the head coach at Wofford College.

== Career ==
Born in Radford, Virginia, Young played collegiately at Emory & Henry College. After completing his career, which included serving as team captain during his junior and senior seasons, Young began his coaching career as an assistant coach at his alma mater. In 1988, he left Emory & Henry to serve one year as an assistant to Oliver Purnell at Radford University.

In 1989, Young began his tenure as an assistant coach at Wofford. He would go on to spend the next 30 years at the school, helping to guide the Terriers in their transition from Division II to Division I independent status, and finally to a spot in the Southern Conference, where the Terriers compete today.

In December 2001, Wofford announced that then-head coach Richard Johnson would be promoted to athletic director, leaving Young to take control of the team starting for the 2002–03 season. His first six years were fairly uneventful, with high points of a .500 conference record in his first season, and overall records of .500 during the 2004–05 and 2007–08 seasons.

However, 2008–09 saw new school records in the Division I era, marking the Terriers' first winning season as a Division I school and the first winning SoCon record in school history. In 2009–10, Young continued to build on this success, leading the Terriers to the Southern Conference regular season and tournament championships, which earned Wofford its first bid to the NCAA tournament. In recognition of his achievements, Young was named the 2010 Southern Conference Coach of the Year , as well as the Hugh Durham National Coach of the Year .

On December 21, 2017, Young led Wofford to a stunning 79–75 win over #5 North Carolina, giving the program its first ever win over a top 25 team. The next season, it defeated Seton Hall 84–68 in the 2019 NCAA Division I men's basketball tournament for the first NCAA Tournament win of Young's career. On November 5, 2019, Young recorded his 300th win, and first win as Virginia Tech's men's basketball coach, by defeating Clemson 67–60.

On November 20, 2019, Young led Virginia Tech to a 100–64 win over Delaware State, giving the program a new school record and also set an ACC record with its 21 3-pointers made. On November 25, 2019, Young led Virginia Tech to a 71–66 victory over No. 3 Michigan State in the Maui Invitational, Young's first victory over a ranked team as head coach of the Hokies. At the close of the 2020–21 regular season, Young was named the ACC Coach of the Year.

On March 12, 2022, Young led the Hokies to the ACC Tournament title for the first time in school history. The tournament final was played against Mike Krzyzewski's Duke Blue Devils in Coach K's final ACC tournament game. Tech, the seven seed, won 82–67 and only reached the final after beating Clemson, Notre Dame, and North Carolina in consecutive nights. The Hokies were the first seven seed to win the tournament in its long history.

== Head coaching record ==
Record table
Season	Team	Overall	Conference	Standing	Postseason
Wofford Terriers (Southern Conference) (2002–2019)
2002–03	Wofford	14–15	8–8	T–3rd (South)	
2003–04	Wofford	9–20	4–12	5th (South)	
2004–05	Wofford	14–14	7–9	5th (South)	
2005–06	Wofford	11–18	6–9	5th (South)	
2006–07	Wofford	10–20	5–13	5th (South)	
2007–08	Wofford	16–16	8–12	4th (South)	
2008–09	Wofford	16–14	12–8	4th (South)	
2009–10	Wofford	26–9	15–3	1st (South)	NCAA Division I Round of 64
2010–11	Wofford	21–13	14–4	T–1st (South)	NCAA Division I Round of 64
2011–12	Wofford	19–14	12–6	T–2nd (South)	CBI First Round
2012–13	Wofford	13–19	7–11	T–3rd (South)	
2013–14	Wofford	20–13	11–5	T–3rd	NCAA Division I Round of 64
2014–15	Wofford	28–7	16–2	1st	NCAA Division I Round of 64
2015–16	Wofford	15–17	11–7	T–3rd	
2016–17	Wofford	16–17	10–8	T–4th	
2017–18	Wofford	21–13	11–7	T–4th	CIT Second Round
2018–19	Wofford	30–5	18–0	1st	NCAA Division I Round of 32
Wofford:		299–244 (.551)	173–124 (.582)		
Virginia Tech Hokies (Atlantic Coast Conference) (2019–present)
2019–20	Virginia Tech	16–16	7–13	T–9th	
2020–21	Virginia Tech	15–7	9–4	3rd	NCAA Division I Round of 64
2021–22	Virginia Tech	23–13	11–9	7th	NCAA Division I Round of 64
2022–23	Virginia Tech	19–15	8–12	11th	NIT First Round
2023–24	Virginia Tech	19–15	10–10	T–8th	NIT Second Round
2024–25	Virginia Tech	13–19	8–12	T–9th	
2025–26	Virginia Tech	19–13	8–10	T–11th	
2026–27	Virginia Tech	6–1	0–0		
Virginia Tech:		130–99 (.568)	60–70 (.462)		
Total:		429–343 (.556)			
National champion Postseason invitational champion Conference regular season champion Conference regular season and conference tournament champion Division regular season champion Division regular season and conference tournament champion Conference tournament champion
