= 2014–15 East Tennessee State Buccaneers men's basketball team =

American college basketball season

2014–15 East Tennessee State Buccaneers men's basketball
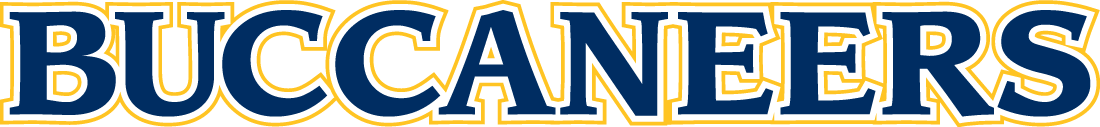
- Conference: Southern Conference
- Record: 16–14 (8–10 SoCon)
- Head coach: Murry Bartow (12th season)
- Assistant coaches: Bob Bolen; Jason Slay; Bill McCammon
- Home arena: Freedom Hall Civic Center

2014–15 Southern Conference men's basketball standings
	Conf.				Overall
Team	W		L	PCT	W		L	PCT
Wofford †	16	–	2	.889	28	–	7	.800
Chattanooga	15	–	3	.833	22	–	10	.688
Mercer	12	–	6	.667	19	–	16	.543
Western Carolina	9	–	9	.500	15	–	17	.469
East Tennessee State	8	–	10	.444	16	–	14	.533
VMI	7	–	11	.389	11	–	19	.367
Samford	6	–	12	.333	13	–	19	.406
The Citadel	6	–	12	.333	11	–	19	.367
UNC Greensboro	6	–	12	.333	11	–	22	.333
Furman	5	–	13	.278	11	–	22	.333
† 2015 SoCon Tournament winner

The 2014–15 East Tennessee State Buccaneers basketball team represented East Tennessee State University during the 2014–15 NCAA Division I men's basketball season. The Buccaneers, led by 12th year head coach Murry Bartow, played their home games at the Freedom Hall Civic Center and returned as members of the Southern Conference, a conference they left in 2005. They finished the season 16–14, 8–10 in SoCon play to finish in fifth place. They lost in the quarterfinals of the SoCon tournament to Western Carolina.

On March 12, head coach Murry Bartow was fired. He had a record of 224–169 in 12 seasons.

== Roster ==
Number	Name	Position	Height	Weight	Year	Hometown
0	Ron Giplaye	Forward	6–6	250	Senior	Lowell, Massachusetts
1	Petey McClain	Guard	6–0	185	Junior	Mobile, Alabama
2	Devin Harris	Guard	6–4	200	Sophomore	Tampa, Florida
3	Peter Jurkin	Center	7–0	230	Junior	Juba, South Sudan
4	Rashawn Rembert	Guard	6–3	195	Senior	Tampa, Florida
5	Jalen Riley	Guard	6–0	150	Senior	Racine, Wisconsin
10	Isaac Banks	Forward	6–7	215	Sophomore	New Orleans, Louisiana
11	Desonta Bradford	Guard	6–4	185	Freshman	Humboldt, Tennessee
12	Tommy Williams	Forward	6–5	220	Junior	Augusta, Georgia
13	A.J. Merriweather	Guard	6–2	185	Sophomore	Jackson, Mississippi
15	Lester Wilson	Forward	6–4	215	Junior	Knoxville, Tennessee
20	Alex Bates	Forward	6–9	235	Senior	Greenbelt, Maryland
21	Tyler Ailshie	Guard	6–1	195	Senior	Kingsport, Tennessee
44	Karl Overstreet	Center	6–10	225	Freshman	Lynchburg, Virginia

== Schedule ==
Date time, TV	Opponent	Result	Record	Site (attendance) city, state
Exhibition
11/03/2014*; 7:00 pm	Milligan	W 94–77		Freedom Hall Civic Center (2,334); Johnson City, Tennessee
Regular season
11/14/2014*; 8:30 pm	at Valparaiso	L 76–90	0–1	Athletics–Recreation Center (2,912); Valparaiso, Indiana
11/18/2014*; 7:00 pm	Virginia–Wise	W 111–66	1–1	Freedom Hall Civic Center (2,229); Johnson City, Tennessee
11/22/2014*; 7:00 pm	UNC Asheville	W 98–87	2–1	Freedom Hall Civic Center (2,517); Johnson City, Tennessee
11/24/2014*; 7:00 pm	at Winthrop	W 69–64	3–1	Winthrop Coliseum (1,498); Rock Hill, South Carolina
12/01/2014*; 7:00 pm	at Morehead State	W 63–59	4–1	Ellis Johnson Arena (2,132); Morehead, Kentucky
12/03/2014; 8:00 pm, ASN	Western Carolina	W 96–89	5–1 (1–0)	Freedom Hall Civic Center (4,287); Johnson City, Tennessee
12/13/2014; 4:00 pm	UNC Greensboro	L 79–80	5–2 (1–1)	Freedom Hall Civic Center (2,375); Johnson City, Tennessee
12/16/2014*; 7:00 pm	at Eastern Kentucky	W 63–60	6–2	McBrayer Arena (1,300); Richmond, Kentucky
12/22/2014*; 7:00 pm	at VCU	L 60–84	6–3	Siegel Center (7,637); Richmond, Virginia
12/31/2014*; 1:00 pm, SECN	at Tennessee	L 61–71	6–4	Thompson–Boling Arena (14,245); Knoxville, Tennessee
01/02/2015; 7:00 pm	VMI	W 98–88	7–4 (2–1)	Freedom Hall Civic Center (2,373); Johnson City, Tennessee
01/05/2015; 7:00 pm	at Samford	W 76–74	8–4 (3–1)	Pete Hanna Center (624); Homewood, Alabama
01/08/2015; 7:00 pm	Mercer	W 71–70	9–4 (4–1)	Freedom Hall Civic Center (2,621); Johnson City, Tennessee
01/10/2015; 4:00 pm	Chattanooga	L 71–74 ^{OT}	9–5 (4–2)	Freedom Hall Civic Center (3,605); Johnson City, Tennessee
01/15/2015; 7:00 pm	at Western Carolina	W 83–76	10–5 (5–2)	Ramsey Center (1,794); Cullowhee, North Carolina
01/17/2015; 1:00 pm	at VMI	L 79–85	10–6 (5–3)	Cameron Hall; Lexington, Virginia
01/19/2015*; 7:00 pm	Tusculum	W 90–52	11–6	Freedom Hall Civic Center (2,380); Johnson City, Tennessee
01/22/2015; 7:00 pm	The Citadel	W 70–59	12–6 (6–3)	Freedom Hall Civic Center (2,710); Johnson City, Tennessee
01/24/2015; 7:00 pm	at Wofford	L 64–72	12–7 (6–4)	Benjamin Johnson Arena (1,907); Spartanburg, South Carolina
01/29/2015; 7:00 pm	at Furman	L 55–59	12–8 (6–5)	Timmons Arena (1,005); Greenville, South Carolina
01/31/2015*; 7:00 pm	North Carolina Central	W 61–59	13–8	Freedom Hall Civic Center (2,957); Johnson City, Tennessee
02/05/2015; 7:00 pm	Wofford	L 64–74	13–9 (6–6)	Freedom Hall Civic Center (3,517); Johnson City, Tennessee
02/07/2015; 4:00 pm	Samford	L 68–71	13–10 (6–7)	Freedom Hall Civic Center (2,715); Johnson City, Tennessee
02/12/2015; 7:00 pm	at UNC Greensboro	W 65–62	14–10 (7–7)	Greensboro Coliseum (2,035); Greensboro, North Carolina
02/14/2015; 4:00 pm, ESPN3	Furman	W 66–59	15–10 (8–7)	Freedom Hall Civic Center (2,658); Johnson City, Tennessee
02/16/2015*; 7:00 pm	Tennessee Tech	W 87–79	16–10	Freedom Hall Civic Center (2,072); Johnson City, Tennessee
02/21/2015; 7:00 pm, ASN	at Chattanooga	L 59–67	16–11 (8–8)	McKenzie Arena (5,179); Chattanooga, Tennessee
02/26/2015; 6:00 pm	at The Citadel	L 73–74	16–12 (8–9)	McAlister Field House (1,358); Charleston, South Carolina
02/28/2015; 4:00 pm, ESPN3	at Mercer	L 64–69	16–13 (8–10)	Hawkins Arena (3,817); Macon, Georgia
SoCon tournament
3/07/2015; 2:30 pm, ESPN3	vs. Western Carolina; Quarterfinals	L 61–67 ^{OT}	16–14	U.S. Cellular Center (6,051); Asheville, North Carolina
*Non-conference game. ^{#}Rankings from AP Poll. (#) Tournament seedings in parentheses. All times are in Eastern Time.
