= 2015 Southern Conference men's basketball tournament =

Basketball tournament

- Classification: Division I
- Season: 2014–15
- Teams: 10
- Site: U.S. Cellular Center; Asheville, North Carolina
- Champions: Wofford (4th title)
- Winning coach: Mike Young (4th title)
- MVP: Lee Skinner (Wofford)
- Television: ESPN3, ESPN2

2014–15 Southern Conference men's basketball standings
	Conf.				Overall
Team	W		L	PCT	W		L	PCT
Wofford †	16	–	2	.889	28	–	7	.800
Chattanooga	15	–	3	.833	22	–	10	.688
Mercer	12	–	6	.667	19	–	16	.543
Western Carolina	9	–	9	.500	15	–	17	.469
East Tennessee State	8	–	10	.444	16	–	14	.533
VMI	7	–	11	.389	11	–	19	.367
Samford	6	–	12	.333	13	–	19	.406
The Citadel	6	–	12	.333	11	–	19	.367
UNC Greensboro	6	–	12	.333	11	–	22	.333
Furman	5	–	13	.278	11	–	22	.333
† 2015 SoCon Tournament winner

The 2015 Southern Conference men's basketball tournament took place Friday, March 6 through Monday, March 9 in Asheville, North Carolina, at the U.S. Cellular Center. The entire tournament was streamed on ESPN3, with the Southern Conference Championship Game televised by ESPN2. The champion, Wofford, received an automatic bid into the 2015 NCAA tournament.

With the addition of East Tennessee State and Mercer, all 10 teams participated in the tournament.

== Format ==
All ten conference members qualify for the tournament. Teams were seeded based on conference winning percentage. The top six seeds received a first-round bye, with the bottom four teams playing two first-round games.

=== Tiebreaking system ===
The tiebreaking system is as follows:

Two teams

1. Head to head record
2. Best record against the highest seeded team not involved in the tie. Continue down through the standings until the tie is broken.
3. Higher RPI, as published by RPIRatings.com

Three or more teams

1. Best record against all teams involved in the tie
2. Best record against the highest seeded team not involved in the tie. Continue down through the standings until the tie is broken.
3. Higher RPI, as published by RPIRatings.com

== Seeds ==
Seed	School	Conference	Overall	Tiebreaker
1	Wofford †#	16–2	25–6	
2	Chattanooga #	15–3	22–9	
3	Mercer #	12–6	17–14	
4	Western Carolina #	9–9	14–16	
5	East Tennessee State #	8–10	16–13	
6	VMI #	7–11	11–18	
7	The Citadel	6–12	11–18	3–1 vs. UNCG, Samford
8	UNC Greensboro	6–12	10–21	2–2 vs. Citadel, Samford
9	Samford	6–12	13–18	1–3 vs. UNCG, Citadel
10	Furman	5–13	8–21	
† – Southern Conference regular season champions, and tournament No. 1 seed. # – Received a first round bye in the conference tournament.

== Schedule ==
Session	Game	Time*	Matchup^{#}	Television	Score
First round - Friday, March 6
1	1	6:00pm	Samford vs. UNC Greensboro	ESPN3	76–81
1	2	8:30pm	Furman vs. The Citadel	ESPN3	73–56
Quarterfinals - Saturday, March 7
2	3	12:00pm	UNC Greensboro vs. Wofford	ESPN3	52–70
2	4	2:30pm	East Tenn. State vs. Western Carolina	ESPN3	61–67 (OT)
3	5	6:00pm	Furman vs. Chattanooga	ESPN3	69–67
3	6	8:30pm	VMI vs. Mercer	ESPN3	61–89
Semifinals - Sunday, March 8
4	7	6:00pm	Western Carolina vs. Wofford	ESPN3	61–73
4	8	8:30pm	Furman vs Mercer	ESPN3	52–49
Championship - Monday, March 9
5	10	7:00pm	Furman vs. Wofford	ESPN2	64–67
*Game times in ET. #-Rankings denote tournament seeding.

== Bracket ==
First round Friday, March 6
8	UNC Greensboro	81
9	Samford	76
7	The Citadel	56
10	Furman	73

Quarterfinals; Saturday, March 7
1	Wofford	70
8	UNC Greensboro	52
4	Western Carolina	67*
5	East Tennessee State	61
2	Chattanooga	67
10	Furman	69
3	Mercer	89
6	VMI	61

Semifinals; Sunday, March 8
1	Wofford	73
4	Western Carolina	61
10	Furman	52
3	Mercer	49

Championship; Monday, March 9
1	Wofford	67
10	Furman	64

* denotes overtime period

== All-tournament team ==
First Team

- Stephen Croone, Furman
- James Sinclair, Western Carolina
- Karl Cochran, Wofford
- Spencer Collins, Wofford
- Lee Skinner, Wofford

Second Team

- Kris Acox, Furman
- Geoff Beans, Furman
- Devin Sibley, Furman
- T. J. Hallice, Mercer
- Ike Nwamu, Mercer
