= Village Christian Academy =

American private christian school in North Carolina

Location
- 908 South McPherson Church Road; Fayetteville, North Carolina 28303; United States; 35°02′57″N 78°56′27″W

Information
- Other name: VCA
- Type: Private
- Religious affiliation: Christian
- Denomination: Non-denominational
- Established: 1998 (28 years ago)
- CEEB code: 341328
- Enrollment: Around 550–650
- Colors: Purple and white
- Athletics: North Carolina Independent Schools Athletic Association (NCISAA)
- Mascot: Knights
- Website: vcanc.com

Village Christian Academy is a private Christian school in Fayetteville, North Carolina, United States. It is located at 908 South McPherson Church Road. It is a Christian school founded by Village Baptist Church, although it is a non-denominational school, and uses the facilities of the church. The school has 550–650 students.

The school offers extended physical therapy services for Academical Gifted (AG) students and Academic Enrichment (AE) for students in need.

VCA's mascot is the Knights. It is also affiliated with FCA, TARS and NHS.
