= 2014–15 Wofford Terriers men's basketball team =

American college basketball season

2014–15 Wofford Terriers men's basketball

Southern Conference regular season & tournament champions

NCAA tournament, round of 64
- Conference: Southern Conference
- Record: 28–7 (16–2 SoCon)
- Head coach: Mike Young (13th season)
- Assistant coaches: Dustin Kerns; Tim Johnson; Kevin Giltner
- Home arena: Benjamin Johnson Arena

2014–15 Southern Conference men's basketball standings
	Conf.				Overall
Team	W		L	PCT	W		L	PCT
Wofford †	16	–	2	.889	28	–	7	.800
Chattanooga	15	–	3	.833	22	–	10	.688
Mercer	12	–	6	.667	19	–	16	.543
Western Carolina	9	–	9	.500	15	–	17	.469
East Tennessee State	8	–	10	.444	16	–	14	.533
VMI	7	–	11	.389	11	–	19	.367
Samford	6	–	12	.333	13	–	19	.406
The Citadel	6	–	12	.333	11	–	19	.367
UNC Greensboro	6	–	12	.333	11	–	22	.333
Furman	5	–	13	.278	11	–	22	.333
† 2015 SoCon Tournament winner

The 2014–15 Wofford Terriers men's basketball team represented Wofford College during the 2014–15 NCAA Division I men's basketball season. The Terriers, led by 13th year head coach Mike Young, played their home games at the Benjamin Johnson Arena and were members of the Southern Conference. They finished the season 28–7, 16–2 in SoCon play to win the SoCon regular season championship. They defeated UNC Greensboro, Western Carolina, and Furman to be champions of the SoCon tournament. They received an automatic bid to the NCAA tournament where they lost in the second round to Arkansas.

== Roster ==
Number	Name	Position	Height	Weight	Year	Hometown
1	Derrick Brooks	Guard	6–2	190	Freshman	Hinesville, Georgia
2	Karl Cochran	Guard	6–1	175	Senior	Marietta, Georgia
3	John Swinton	Guard	6–2	190	Senior	Mt. Pleasant, South Carolina
4	Zach Korkowski	Forward	6–6	205	Junior	Williamsburg, Virginia
5	Eric Garcia	Guard	6–0	181	Sophomore	Aurora, Colorado
11	Bobby Perez	Guard	5–11	165	Freshman	Atlanta
12	Jeremiah Tate	Guard	6–1	180	Sophomore	Columbia, South Carolina
14	Spencer Collins	Guard	6–4	195	Junior	Easley, South Carolina
20	Jaylen Allen	Guard	6–3	180	Sophomore	Johnson City, Tennessee
24	Justin Gordon	Forward	6–6	205	Junior	Charlotte, North Carolina
31	C.J. Neumann	Forward	6–7	230	Junior	St. Paul, Minnesota
33	Cameron Jackson	Forward	6–7	255	Freshman	Winchester, Virginia
34	Lee Skinner	Forward	6–6	220	Senior	Lombard, Illinois
35	Ryan Sawvell	Forward	6–8	215	Junior	Mundelein, Illinois
40	Eric Wagenlander	Guard	6–2	180	Sophomore	Mt. Pleasant, South Carolina

== Schedule ==
Date time, TV	Rank^{#}	Opponent^{#}	Result	Record	Site (attendance) city, state
Regular season
11/15/2014*; 12:00 am, P12N		at Stanford; Coaches vs. Cancer Classic	L 59–74	0–1	Maples Pavilion (3,650); Stanford, California
11/18/2014*; 7:00 am, ESPN2		Iona; College Hoops Tip-Off Marathon	W 86–73	1–1	Benjamin Johnson Arena (3,014); Spartanburg, South Carolina
11/21/2014*; 7:00 pm		at Fairfield; Coaches vs. Cancer Classic	W 54–36	2–1	Webster Bank Arena (1,733); Bridgeport, Connecticut
11/22/2014*; 5:00 pm		vs. South Dakota; Coaches vs. Cancer Classic	W 72–68	3–1	Webster Bank Arena (1,733); Bridgeport, Connecticut
11/23/2014*; 12:00 pm		vs. Sam Houston State; Coaches vs. Cancer Classic	W 64–53	4–1	Webster Bank Arena (1,487); Bridgeport, Connecticut
11/25/2014*; 7:00 pm		Ohio Valley	W 82–54	5–1	Benjamin Johnson Arena (1,014); Spartanburg, South Carolina
11/29/2014*; 4:30 pm		at William & Mary	L 62–66	5–2	Kaplan Arena (2,689); Williamsburg, Virginia
12/03/2014*; 7:00 pm		Presbyterian	W 66–45	6–2	Benjamin Johnson Arena (1,222); Spartanburg, South Carolina
12/06/2014*; 2:00 pm		Florida National	W 88–57	7–2	Benjamin Johnson Arena (894); Spartanburg, South Carolina
12/14/2014*; 4:00 pm, FS South		at NC State	W 55–54	8–2	Reynolds Coliseum (5,495); Raleigh, North Carolina
12/17/2014*; 7:00 pm		Charleston Southern	W 64–58	9–2	Benjamin Johnson Arena (1,606); Spartanburg, South Carolina
12/22/2014*; 7:00 pm		at No. 18 West Virginia	L 44–77	9–3	WVU Coliseum (7,897); Morgantown, West Virginia
12/31/2014*; 3:00 pm, FS South		at No. 2 Duke	L 55–84	9–4	Cameron Indoor Stadium (9,314); Durham, North Carolina
01/03/2015; 3:00 pm, ASN		at Samford	W 68–65	10–4	Pete Hanna Center (837); Homewood, Alabama
01/05/2015; 8:00 pm, ASN		at Chattanooga	W 68–64	11–4 (2–0)	McKenzie Arena (2,927); Chattanooga, Tennessee
01/08/2015; 7:00 pm		VMI	W 75–70	12–4 (3–0)	Benjamin Johnson Arena (1,970); Spartanburg, South Carolina
01/10/2015; 7:00 pm		Samford	W 72–62	13–4 (4–0)	Benjamin Johnson Arena (1,883); Spartanburg, South Carolina
01/15/2015; 6:00 pm		at The Citadel	L 66–69	13–5 (4–1)	McAlister Field House (1,971); Charleston, South Carolina
01/17/2015; 7:00 pm		Western Carolina	W 62–43	14–5 (5–1)	Benjamin Johnson Arena (2,012); Spartanburg, South Carolina
01/22/2015; 7:00 pm		Furman	W 74–49	15–5 (6–1)	Benjamin Johnson Arena (1,812); Spartanburg, South Carolina
01/24/2015; 7:00 pm		East Tennessee State	W 72–64	16–5 (7–1)	Benjamin Johnson Arena (1,907); Spartanburg, South Carolina
01/29/2015; 7:00 pm		at UNC Greensboro	W 58–42	17–5 (8–1)	Greensboro Coliseum (1,630); Greensboro, North Carolina
01/31/2015; 7:00 pm, ESPN3		Mercer	W 49–46	18–5 (9–1)	Benjamin Johnson Arena (3,036); Spartanburg, South Carolina
02/05/2015; 7:00 pm		at East Tennessee State	W 74–64	19–5 (10–1)	Freedom Hall Civic Center (3,517); Johnson City, Tennessee
02/07/2015; 1:00 pm		at VMI	W 65–62	20–5 (11–1)	Cameron Hall (2,067); Lexington, Virginia
02/12/2015; 7:00 pm		Chattanooga	L 46–56	20–6 (11–2)	Benjamin Johnson Arena (1,897); Spartanburg, South Carolina
02/14/2015; 5:00 pm		at Western Carolina	W 75–55	21–6 (12–2)	Ramsey Center (2,174); Cullowhee, North Carolina
02/19/2015; 7:00 pm		UNC Greensboro	W 77–62	22–6 (13–2)	Benjamin Johnson Arena (1,755); Spartanburg, South Carolina
02/21/2015; 7:00 pm		The Citadel	W 78–52	23–6 (14–2)	Benjamin Johnson Arena (3,008); Spartanburg, South Carolina
02/26/2015; 7:00 pm, ESPN3		at Mercer	W 76–72	24–6 (15–2)	Hawkins Arena (3,870); Macon, Georgia
02/28/2015; 4:00 pm		at Furman	W 62–60	25–6 (16–2)	Timmons Arena (2,202); Greenville, South Carolina
SoCon tournament
3/07/2015; 12:00 pm, ESPN3		vs. UNC Greensboro; Quarterfinals	W 70–52	26–6	U.S. Cellular Center (6,051); Asheville, North Carolina
3/08/2015; 6:00 pm, ESPN3		vs. Western Carolina; Semifinals	W 73–61	27–6	U.S. Cellular Center (5,545); Asheville, North Carolina
3/09/2015; 7:00 pm, ESPN2		vs. Furman; Championship game	W 67–64	28–6	U.S. Cellular Center (5,153); Asheville, North Carolina
NCAA tournament
3/19/2015*; 9:50 pm, TNT	No. (12 W)	vs. No. 21 (5 W) Arkansas; Second round	L 53–56	28–7	Jacksonville Veterans Memorial Arena (12,761); Jacksonville, Florida
*Non-conference game. ^{#}Rankings from AP Poll. (#) Tournament seedings in parentheses. All times are in Eastern Time. (#) during NCAA Tournament is seed with Region W=West.
