= 2015 Ohio Valley Conference men's basketball tournament =

- Classification: Division I
- Season: 2014–15
- Teams: 8
- Site: Nashville Municipal Auditorium; Nashville, Tennessee
- Champions: Belmont (2nd title)
- Winning coach: Rick Byrd (2nd title)
- MVP: Taylor Barnette (Belmont)
- Television: OVCDN/ESPN3, ESPNU, ESPN2

2014–15 Ohio Valley Conference men's basketball standings
| | Conf. | | | | Overall |
| Team | W | | L | PCT | W | | L | PCT |
|---|---|---|---|---|---|---|---|---|
East
| Belmont † | 11 | – | 5 | .688 | 22 | – | 11 | .667 |
| Eastern Kentucky | 11 | – | 5 | .688 | 21 | – | 12 | .636 |
| Morehead State | 10 | – | 6 | .625 | 17 | – | 17 | .500 |
| Jacksonville State | 5 | – | 11 | .313 | 12 | – | 19 | .387 |
| Tennessee Tech | 4 | – | 12 | .250 | 12 | – | 18 | .400 |
| Tennessee State | 2 | – | 14 | .125 | 5 | – | 26 | .161 |
West
| Murray State | 16 | – | 0 | 1.000 | 29 | – | 6 | .829 |
| UT Martin | 10 | – | 6 | .625 | 21 | – | 13 | .618 |
| Eastern Illinois | 9 | – | 7 | .563 | 18 | – | 15 | .545 |
| SIU Edwardsville | 8 | – | 8 | .500 | 12 | – | 16 | .429 |
| Southeast Missouri St. | 7 | – | 9 | .438 | 13 | – | 17 | .433 |
| Austin Peay | 3 | – | 13 | .188 | 8 | – | 22 | .267 |
† 2015 OVC tournament winner Rankings from AP poll

The 2015 Ohio Valley Conference men's basketball tournament was held March 4–7 at Nashville Municipal Auditorium in Nashville, Tennessee.

== Format ==
The OVC tournament was an eight-team tournament with the third and fourth seeds receiving a first round bye and the two divisional winners receiving byes through to the semifinals.

The top team in each division, based on conference winning percentage, automatically earned a berth into the tournament. The next six teams with the highest conference winning percentage also earned a bid, regardless of division. The No. 1 seed went to the divisional winner with the higher conference winning percentage, while the No. 2 seed automatically went to the other divisional winner. The remaining six teams were seeded 3–8 by conference winning percentage, regardless of division.

== Seeds ==
| Seed | School | Conference | Overall | Tiebreaker |
|---|---|---|---|---|
| 1 | Murray State | 16–0 | 26–4 | |
| 2 | Eastern Kentucky | 11–5 | 19–10 | |
| 3 | Belmont | 11–5 | 19–10 | |
| 4 | Tennessee–Martin | 10–6 | 18–11 | |
| 5 | Morehead State | 10–6 | 15–16 | |
| 6 | Eastern Illinois | 9–7 | 16–13 | |
| 7 | SIU Edwardsville | 8–8 | 12–15 | |
| 8 | Southeast Missouri State | 7–9 | 13–16 | |

== Bracket ==
First round Wednesday, March 4 OVCDN
5 | Morehead State | 79
8 | SE Missouri State | 74
6 | Eastern Illinois | 78
7 | SIU Edwardsville | 66

Quarterfinals; Thursday, March 5 OVCDN
4 | Tennessee–Martin | 65
5 | Morehead State | 76
3 | Belmont | 97
6 | Eastern Illinois | 64

Semifinals; Friday, March 6 ESPNU
1 | #25 Murray State | 80
5 | Morehead State | 77
2 | Eastern Kentucky | 52
3 | Belmont | 53

Championship; Saturday, March 7 ESPN2
1 | #25 Murray State | 87
3 | Belmont | 88

== See also ==
- 2015 Ohio Valley Conference women's basketball tournament
