= 2014–15 Eastern Illinois Panthers men's basketball team =

American college basketball season

2014–15 Eastern Illinois Panthers men's basketball
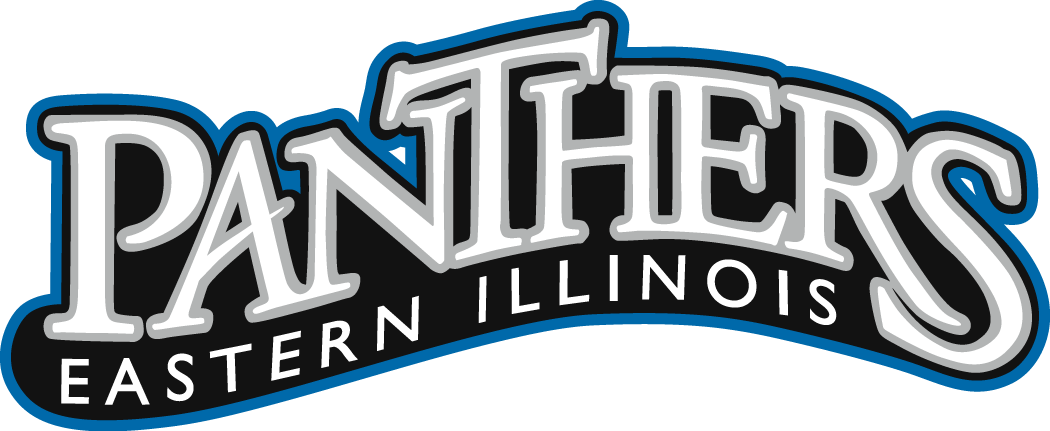

CIT, Second round
- Conference: Ohio Valley Conference
- West Division
- Record: 18–15 (9–7 OVC)
- Head coach: Jay Spoonhour (3rd season)
- Assistant coaches: Rand Chappell; J.R. Renolds; Marc Stricker
- Home arena: Lantz Arena

2014–15 Ohio Valley Conference men's basketball standings
	Conf.				Overall
Team	W		L	PCT	W		L	PCT
East
Belmont †	11	–	5	.688	22	–	11	.667
Eastern Kentucky	11	–	5	.688	21	–	12	.636
Morehead State	10	–	6	.625	17	–	17	.500
Jacksonville State	5	–	11	.313	12	–	19	.387
Tennessee Tech	4	–	12	.250	12	–	18	.400
Tennessee State	2	–	14	.125	5	–	26	.161
West
Murray State	16	–	0	1.000	29	–	6	.829
UT Martin	10	–	6	.625	21	–	13	.618
Eastern Illinois	9	–	7	.563	18	–	15	.545
SIU Edwardsville	8	–	8	.500	12	–	16	.429
Southeast Missouri St.	7	–	9	.438	13	–	17	.433
Austin Peay	3	–	13	.188	8	–	22	.267
† 2015 OVC tournament winner Rankings from AP poll

The 2014–15 Eastern Illinois Panthers men's basketball team represented Eastern Illinois University during the 2014–15 NCAA Division I men's basketball season. The Panthers, led by third year head coach Jay Spoonhour, played their home games at Lantz Arena and were members of the West Division of the Ohio Valley Conference. They finished the season 18–15, 9–7 in OVC play to finish in third place in the West Division. They advanced to the quarterfinals of the OVC tournament where they lost to Belmont. They were invited to the CollegeInsider.com Tournament where they defeated Oakland in the first round before losing in the second round to Evansville.

== Roster ==
Number	Name	Position	Height	Weight	Year	Hometown
2	Cornell Johnson	Guard	5–7	150	Freshman	St. Louis, Missouri
3	LeTrell Viser	Guard	6–2	185	Junior	Aurora, Illinois
5	Reggie Smith	Guard	6–0	185	Senior	Chicago, Illinois
10	Luke Norman	Guard	6–1	185	Junior	The Bronx, New York
11	Anthony Johnson	Guard	6–4	200	Sophomore	Oblong, Illinois
12	Keenan Anderson	Forward	6–6	200	Senior	Marion, Arkansas
15	Trae Anderson	Forward	6–4	235	Junior	St. Louis, Missouri
25	Jake Verhagen	Forward	6–6	200	Sophomore	Appleton, Wisconsin
30	Dylan Chatman	Guard	6–1	180	Senior	Belleville, Illinois
33	Luke Piotrowski	Forward	6–11	245	Junior	Port Republic, New Jersey
35	Chris Olivier	Forward	6–8	245	Junior	Chicago, Illinois
41	Mat Piotrowski	Center	7–2	265	Senior	Port Republic, New Jersey
50	Julian Robertson	Guard	6–3	190	Junior	Chicago, Illinois
54	Justin Earls	Forward	6–7	210	Freshman	Chicago, Illinois
55	Josh Piper	Forward	6–8	225	Senior	Champaign, Illinois

== Schedule ==
Date time, TV	Opponent	Result	Record	Site (attendance) city, state
Exhibition
11/10/2014*; 7:00 pm	St. Francis (IL)	W 85–54		Lantz Arena (610); Charleston, Illinois
Regular season
11/14/2014*; 7:00 pm	at Missouri State	L 53–64	0–1	JQH Arena (6,004); Springfield, Missouri
11/17/2014*; 7:00 pm	Eureka	W 81–51	1–1	Lantz Arena (877); Charleston, Illinois
11/20/2014*; 7:00 pm	UC Davis	L 61–63	1–2	Lantz Arena (1,044); Charleston, Illinois
11/23/2014*; 4:00 pm, ESPN3	at Cincinnati; Emerald Coast Classic	L 49–54	1–3	Fifth Third Arena (6,823); Cincinnati
11/25/2014*; 7:00 pm, FS1	at No. 23 Creighton; Emerald Coast Classic	L 53–75	1–4	CenturyLink Center Omaha (17,408); Omaha, Nebraska
11/28/2014*; 11:00 am	vs. North Carolina Central; Emerald Coast Classic	L 40–65	1–5	The Arena at NWFSC (125); Niceville, Florida
11/29/2014*; 11:00 am	vs. Southern; Emerald Coast Classic	W 54–43	2–5	The Arena at NWFSC (135); Niceville, Florida
12/03/2014*; 7:00 pm	Ball State	W 61–54	3–5	Lantz Arena (1,204); Charleston, Illinois
12/09/2014*; 9:00 pm	at UC Davis	L 70–80	3–6	The Pavilion (1,275); Davis, California
12/13/2014*; 7:00 pm	Northern Illinois	W 59–55	4–6	Lantz Arena (2,044); Charleston, Illinois
12/20/2014*; 1:00 pm	at Indiana State	W 60–56	5–6	Hulman Center (3,571); Terre Haute, Indiana
12/23/2014*; 1:00 pm, ESPN3	at Cleveland State	W 67–65	6–6	Wolstein Center (1,169); Cleveland, Ohio
01/01/2015; 3:15 pm	Tennessee Tech	W 61–59	7–6 (1–0)	Lantz Arena (805); Charleston, Illinois
01/03/2015; 3:15 pm	Jacksonville State	W 59–50 ^{OT}	8–6 (2–0)	Lantz Arena (806); Charleston, Illinois
01/07/2015; 7:30 pm	at Tennessee State	W 64–57	9–6 (3–0)	Gentry Complex (406); Nashville, Tennessee
01/10/2015; 3:15 pm	Belmont	W 84–73	10–6 (4–0)	Lantz Arena (1,204); Charleston, Illinois
01/15/2015; 6:30 pm	at Eastern Kentucky	W 72–65	11–6 (5–0)	McBrayer Arena (2,400); Richmond, Kentucky
01/17/2015; 1:00 pm	at Morehead State	W 65–62	12–6 (6–0)	Ellis Johnson Arena (2,207); Morehead, Kentucky
01/22/2015; 8:00 pm, CBSSN	Murray State	L 62–77	12–7 (6–1)	Lantz Arena (4,542); Charleston, Illinois
01/24/2015; 3:15 pm	Austin Peay	L 52–56	12–8 (6–2)	Lantz Arena (2,103); Charleston, Illinois
01/29/2015; 6:30 pm	at UT Martin	L 51–81	12–9 (6–3)	Skyhawk Arena (3,103); Martin, Tennessee
01/31/2015; 3:15 pm	SIU Edwardsville	W 57–54	13–9 (7–3)	Lantz Arena (2,295); Charleston, Illinois
02/03/2015*; 7:00 pm	Baker	W 59–32	14–9	Lantz Arena (569); Charleston, Illinois
02/07/2015; 6:00 pm	at Southeast Missouri State	L 64–68	14–10 (7–4)	Show Me Center (1,754); Cape Girardeau, Missouri
02/12/2015; 5:15 pm	at Austin Peay	W 66–55	15–10 (8–4)	Dunn Center (1,186); Clarksville, Tennessee
02/14/2015; 7:00 pm	at SIU Edwardsville	L 63–80	15–11 (8–5)	Vadalabene Center (1,434); Edwardsville, Illinois
02/19/2015; 7:00 pm, ASN	UT Martin	L 73–75 ^{OT}	15–12 (8–6)	Lantz Arena (1,202); Charleston, Illinois
02/22/2015; 5:30 pm, ASN	Southeast Missouri State	W 73–65	16–12 (9–6)	Lantz Arena (1,322); Charleston, Illinois
02/26/2015; 7:00 pm	at Murray State	L 57–65	16–13 (9–7)	CFSB Center (5,961); Murray, Kentucky
Ohio Valley tournament
03/04/2015; 6:00 pm	vs. SIU Edwardsville; First round	W 78–66	17–13	Nashville Municipal Auditorium (723); Nashville, Tennessee
03/05/2015; 8:00 pm	vs. Belmont; Quarterfinals	L 64–97	17–14	Nashville Municipal Auditorium (839); Nashville, Tennessee
CollegeInsider.com tournament
03/17/2015*; 6:00 pm, Comcast 900	at Oakland; First round	W 97–91	18–14	Athletics Center O'rena (2,609); Rochester, Michigan
03/23/2015*; 7:00 pm	Evansville; Second round	L 68–83	18–15	Lantz Arena (2,404); Charleston, Illinois
*Non-conference game. ^{#}Rankings from AP Poll. (#) Tournament seedings in parentheses. All times are in Central Time.
