= Rick Byrd =

American college basketball coach

Biographical details
- Born: April 30, 1953 (age 73); Knoxville, Tennessee, U.S.
- Education: Tennessee

Coaching career (HC unless noted)
- 1976–1978: Maryville (asst.)
- 1978–1980: Maryville
- 1980–1983: Tennessee Tech (asst.)
- 1983–1986: Lincoln Memorial
- 1986–2019: Belmont

Head coaching record
- Overall: 805–402 (.667)

Accomplishments and honors

Championships
- 3× TCAC Tournament champion (1988, 1994, 1995); A-Sun North Division champion (2003); 4× A-Sun regular season champion (2006, 2008, 2010, 2011); 5× A-Sun tournament champion (2006–2008, 2011, 2012); 5× OVC East Division champion (2013–2017); 5× OVC regular season champion (2012, 2013, 2016, 2017, 2019); 2× OVC tournament champion (2013, 2015)

Awards
- NAIA National Coach of the Year (1995); Hugh Durham National Coach of the Year (2011); 2× A-Sun Coach of the Year (2008, 2011); 3× OVC Coach of the Year (2013, 2017, 2019); Belmont Athletic Hall of Fame (1996); NAIA Hall of Fame (2004); Tennessee Sports Hall of Fame (2013); Dr. James Naismith National Sportsmanship Award (1994); NCAA Bob Frederick Sportsmanship Award (2012)
- College Basketball Hall of Fame; Inducted in 2021

Richard F. Byrd (born April 30, 1953) is a retired American college basketball coach who served as the head coach of the Belmont Bruins men's basketball team from 1986-2019. On February 16, 2017, with the Bruins win over Eastern Kentucky, Byrd marked his 750th career win, 658 with Belmont. He retired after the 2018–19 season with 805 wins, which ranks twelfth all-time among NCAA Division I men's basketball coaches.

== Early life ==
Byrd grew up in Knoxville, Tennessee, where he would sit alongside his father, Ben Byrd, and watch him write articles on the Tennessee men's basketball games as a kid. He then went to play basketball at a Florida junior college for a year, but decided to come back home to Knoxville and attend the University of Tennessee, where he was asked to join the junior varsity team for the Volunteers his senior year. The next year, in order to start his coaching career, he became the student assistant to the varsity squad. The very next year Byrd also attempted to become a graduate assistant for the Vols.

Byrd then went to nearby Division III school Maryville as an assistant coach. After Maryville, Byrd moved to Tennessee Tech as an assistant for a few seasons, before becoming head coach at NAIA (Note: Lincoln Memorial is now competing at the NCAA Division II ranks) Lincoln Memorial where he stayed for three seasons and finished with a 69–28 overall record.

== Career at Belmont ==
In 1986, Byrd was hired by Belmont as head coach.

At the time of his retirement, Byrd was one of five active NCAA coaches to have 500 wins at one school. Byrd was also one of 11 active coaches to have more than 600 career wins. Byrd won his 700th game as a head coach on January 17, 2015, when Belmont defeated Austin Peay 89–83. Byrd was first among all active NCAA Division I men’s basketball head coaches (min. 10 years at school) when ranked by percentage of schools’ all-time wins, at his retirement having accounted for over 59 percent of the total victories in Belmont history. Only three Division I men's head coaches in the nation had been at their respective institutions longer than Byrd's 30 years of service at Belmont.

He led Belmont to eight NCAA Tournaments in 2006, 2007, 2008, 2011, 2012, 2013, 2015 and 2019. Under Byrd's guidance, the Bruins won 239 games and posted a remarkable 179–43 (.806) record in conference games over his last ten years. Byrd, from 2011 to 2014, led the Bruins to be one of only six NCAA Division I men's basketball programs to win 26 or more games per season, joining the select company of Duke, Florida, Syracuse, VCU, and Wichita State.

On April 1, 2019, Byrd announced his retirement from Belmont after 33 years at the helm of the program.

== Notable players ==
Byrd has coached many players that have gone on to have very successful careers after their Belmont careers, including J.J. Mann, the Ohio Valley Conference's Player of the Year, a first-team Academic All-American and the winningest player in Belmont history. He now plays for the German professional team Phoenix Hagen.

Byrd also coached Ian Clark, NBA shooting guard. Clark was Associated Press All-America Honorable Mention, Naismith and Lou Henson National Player of the Year candidate, Lefty Driesell Defensive All-America, Mid-Major All-America, OVC co-Player of the Year, First Team All-OVC, OVC Defensive Player of the Year, OVC All-Tournament Team, Tennessee Sports Writers Association (TSWA) Men's Basketball Player of the Year all, among many other awards, all under the direction of Byrd.

Byrd also coached Kerron Johnson who helped take the Belmont program to new heights, leading the Bruins to 102 victories, four regular season conference championships, three conference tournament championships and three consecutive NCAA Tournament appearances. Moreover, Johnson helped Belmont earn national Top 25 poll votes three straight seasons and the program's best NCAA Tournament seed – No. 11 – in 2013. This seed would later be matched by the 2018–19 squad.

== Head coaching record ==
Record table
| Season | Team | Overall | Conference | Standing | Postseason |
|---|---|---|---|---|---|
Maryville Scots (Old Dominion Athletic Conference) (1978–1980)
| 1978–79 | Maryville | 8–16 | | | |
| 1979–80 | Maryville | 15–11 | | | |
| Maryville: | | 23–27 (.460) | | | |
Lincoln Memorial Railsplitters (Volunteer State Athletic Conference) (1983–1986)
| 1983–84 | Lincoln Memorial | 22–10 | 11–1 | | NAIA District 24 Playoffs |
| 1984–85 | Lincoln Memorial | 26–9 | 10–2 | | NAIA District 24 Playoffs |
| 1985–86 | Lincoln Memorial | 21–9 | 11–1 | 1st | NAIA District 24 Playoffs |
| Lincoln Memorial: | | 69–28 (.711) | 32–4 (.889) | | |
Belmont Rebels (Tennessee Collegiate Athletic Conference) (1986–1995)
| 1986–87 | Belmont | 15–15 | 7–9 | | |
| 1987–88 | Belmont | 22–9 | 15–1 | | NAIA District 24 Playoffs |
| 1988–89 | Belmont | 25–10 | 12–4 | | NAIA first round |
| 1989–90 | Belmont | 27–7 | 14–2 | | NAIA District 24 Playoffs |
| 1990–91 | Belmont | 23–9 | 11–5 | | NAIA District 24 Playoffs |
| 1991–92 | Belmont | 22–10 | 12–4 | | NAIA District 24 Playoffs |
| 1992–93 | Belmont | 30–6 | 12–4 | | NAIA Sweet Sixteen |
| 1993–94 | Belmont | 30–7 | 14–2 | 1st | NAIA Quarterfinals |
| 1994–95 | Belmont | 37–2 | 18–0 | 1st | NAIA semifinals |
Belmont Bruins (Tennessee Collegiate Athletic Conference) (1995–1996)
| 1995–96 | Belmont | 29–11 | 13–5 | | NAIA semifinals |
Belmont Bruins (NCAA Independent) (1996–2001)
| 1996–97 | Belmont | 15–11 | | | |
| 1997–98 | Belmont | 9–18 | | | |
| 1998–99 | Belmont | 14–13 | | | |
| 1999–2000 | Belmont | 7–21 | | | |
| 2000–01 | Belmont | 13–15 | | | |
Belmont Bruins (Atlantic Sun Conference) (2001–2012)
| 2001–02 | Belmont | 11–17 | 8–12 | T–7th | |
| 2002–03 | Belmont | 17–12 | 12–4 | 1st (North) | |
| 2003–04 | Belmont | 21–9 | 15–5 | 3rd | NIT Opening Round |
| 2004–05 | Belmont | 14–16 | 12–8 | 3rd | |
| 2005–06 | Belmont | 20–11 | 15–5 | T–1st | NCAA round of 64 |
| 2006–07 | Belmont | 23–10 | 14–4 | 2nd | NCAA round of 64 |
| 2007–08 | Belmont | 25–9 | 14–2 | 1st | NCAA round of 64 |
| 2008–09 | Belmont | 20–13 | 14–6 | T–2nd | CIT Quarterfinals |
| 2009–10 | Belmont | 19–12 | 14–6 | T–1st | |
| 2010–11 | Belmont | 30–5 | 19–1 | 1st | NCAA round of 64 |
| 2011–12 | Belmont | 27–8 | 16–2 | 1st | NCAA round of 64 |
Belmont Bruins (Ohio Valley Conference) (2012–2019)
| 2012–13 | Belmont | 26–7 | 14–2 | 1st (East) | NCAA round of 64 |
| 2013–14 | Belmont | 26–10 | 14–2 | 1st (East) | NIT Quarterfinals |
| 2014–15 | Belmont | 22–11 | 11–5 | T–1st (East) | NCAA round of 64 |
| 2015–16 | Belmont | 20–12 | 12–4 | 1st (East) | NIT first round |
| 2016–17 | Belmont | 23–7 | 15–1 | 1st (East) | NIT second round |
| 2017–18 | Belmont | 24–9 | 15–3 | 2nd | |
| 2018–19 | Belmont | 27–6 | 16–2 | T–1st | NCAA round of 64 |
| Belmont: | | 713–347 (.673) | 373–108 (.775) | | |
| Total: | | 805–402 (.667) | | | |
National champion Postseason invitational champion Conference regular season champion Conference regular season and conference tournament champion Division regular season champion Division regular season and conference tournament champion Conference tournament champion

== See also ==
- List of college men's basketball coaches with 600 wins
