= 2014–15 Jacksonville State Gamecocks men's basketball team =

American college basketball season

2014–15 Jacksonville State Gamecocks men's basketball
- Conference: Ohio Valley Conference
- East Division
- Record: 12–19 (5–11 OVC)
- Head coach: James Green (7th season)
- Assistant coaches: Reggie Sharp; Eugene Harris; Ronnie Dean
- Home arena: Pete Mathews Coliseum

2014–15 Ohio Valley Conference men's basketball standings
	Conf.				Overall
Team	W		L	PCT	W		L	PCT
East
Belmont †	11	–	5	.688	22	–	11	.667
Eastern Kentucky	11	–	5	.688	21	–	12	.636
Morehead State	10	–	6	.625	17	–	17	.500
Jacksonville State	5	–	11	.313	12	–	19	.387
Tennessee Tech	4	–	12	.250	12	–	18	.400
Tennessee State	2	–	14	.125	5	–	26	.161
West
Murray State	16	–	0	1.000	29	–	6	.829
UT Martin	10	–	6	.625	21	–	13	.618
Eastern Illinois	9	–	7	.563	18	–	15	.545
SIU Edwardsville	8	–	8	.500	12	–	16	.429
Southeast Missouri St.	7	–	9	.438	13	–	17	.433
Austin Peay	3	–	13	.188	8	–	22	.267
† 2015 OVC tournament winner Rankings from AP poll

The 2014–15 Jacksonville State Gamecocks men's basketball team represented Jacksonville State University during the 2014–15 NCAA Division I men's basketball season. The Gamecocks, led by seventh year head coach James Green, played their home games at the Pete Mathews Coliseum and were members of the East Division of the Ohio Valley Conference. They finished the season 12–19, 5–11 in OVC play to finish in fourth place in the East Division. They failed to qualify for the OVC Tournament.

== Roster ==
Number	Name	Position	Height	Weight	Year	Hometown
0	Gabriel Dos Santos	Guard	6–4	210	Junior	Coral Springs, Florida
1	Avery Moore	Guard	5–10	155	Senior	Tallahassee, Florida
2	JaQuail Townser	Guard	6–3	195	Junior	Alton, Illinois
3	Randall Smith	Guard	6–0	170	RS–Freshman	Lawrenceville, Georgia
4	Joe Kuligoski	Guard/Forward	6–5	210	Sophomore	Orland Park, Illinois
5	Undra Mitchem	Guard	6–2	200	Sophomore	Leesburg, Florida
10	Nathan Laing	Guard	6–0	165	RS–Freshman	Lillington, North Carolina
11	Darion Rackley	Guard	6–3	170	Senior	St. Louis, Missouri
13	Dontay Jackson	Guard	6–1	175	Junior	Staten Island, New York
14	Edward Jones	Forward	6–7	180	Freshman	Atlanta
21	Malcolm Drumwright	Guard	6–3	165	Freshman	Rancho Cucamonga, California
22	Jamal Hunter	Center/Forward	6–8	200	Senior	Macon, Mississippi
23	D.J. Felder	Forward	6–7	232	Senior	Topeka, Kansas
24	Darrius Moore	Forward	6–8	252	RS–Sophomore	Memphis, Tennessee
25	Dietrich Cole	Forward/Center	6–9	190	Freshman	Detroit, Michigan
31	TJ Sams	Guard	6–2	173	Freshman	Fort Valley, Georgia
32	Jeremy Watson	Forward	6–7	200	RS–Junior	Birmingham, Alabama

== Schedule ==
Date time, TV	Opponent	Result	Record	Site (attendance) city, state
Exhibition
11/04/2014*; 7:00 pm	William Carey	W 62–54		Pete Mathews Coliseum (1,721); Jacksonville, Alabama
11/10/2014*; 7:00 pm	Columbus State	W 77–53		Pete Mathews Coliseum (1,198); Jacksonville, Alabama
Regular Season
11/14/2014*; 6:00 pm	at Marshall; Global Sports Showcase	L 55–74	0–1	Cam Henderson Center (5,463); Huntington, West Virginia
11/17/2014*; 6:00 pm	at No. 7 Louisville; Global Sports Showcase	L 39–88	0–2	KFC Yum! Center (20,479); Louisville, Kentucky
11/19/2014*; 6:00 pm, ESPN3	at Cleveland State; Global Sports Showcase	L 46–60	0–3	Wolstein Center (1,153); Cleveland, Ohio
11/22/2014*; 4:30 pm	Miles	W 88–71	1–3	Pete Mathews Coliseum (554); Jacksonville, Alabama
11/25/2014*; 7:00 pm	at Alabama A&M	W 67–61	2–3	Elmore Gymnasium (352); Huntsville, Alabama
11/28/2014*; 6:00 pm	Savannah State; Global Sports Showcase	W 74–71	3–3	Pete Mathews Coliseum (709); Jacksonville, Alabama
11/30/2014*; 2:00 pm	Fort Valley State	L 49–81	4–3	Pete Mathews Coliseum (1,309); Jacksonville, Alabama
12/03/2014*; 7:00 pm	Winthrop	W 79–76 ^{OT}	5–3	Pete Mathews Coliseum (1,433); Jacksonville, Alabama
12/06/2014*; 3:00 pm	at Alabama A&M	L 55–80	5–4	Dunn–Oliver Acadome (N/A); Montgomery, Alabama
12/14/2014*; 2:00 pm	Dartmouth	L 67–79	6–4	Pete Mathews Coliseum (3,312); Jacksonville, Alabama
12/16/2014*; 7:00 pm	UNC Asheville	W 64–55	7–4	Pete Mathews Coliseum (1,399); Jacksonville, Alabama
12/20/2014*; 8:00 pm	at Northern Colorado	L 60–69	7–5	Bank of Colorado Arena (1,206); Greeley, Colorado
12/22/2014*; 8:00 pm	at Air Force	L 65–66 ^{OT}	7–6	Clune Arena (813); Colorado Springs, Colorado
12/27/2014*; 1:00 pm	at Jacksonville	L 61–75	7–7	Jacksonville Veterans Memorial Arena (670); Jacksonville, Florida
01/01/2015; 1:00 pm	at SIU Edwardsville	L 57–73	7–8 (0–1)	Vadalabene Center (1,674); Edwardsville, Illinois
01/03/2015; 3:15 pm	at Eastern Illinois	L 50–59 ^{OT}	7–9 (0–2)	Lantz Arena (806); Charleston, Illinois
01/08/2015; 8:00 pm	Austin Peay	W 71–59	8–9 (1–2)	Pete Mathews Coliseum (1,801); Jacksonville, Alabama
01/11/2015; 5:00 pm	Murray State	L 57–84	8–10 (1–3)	Pete Mathews Coliseum (3,196); Jacksonville, Alabama
01/14/2015; 8:00 pm	Southeast Missouri State	L 52–69	8–11 (1–4)	Pete Mathews Coliseum (1,598); Jacksonville, Alabama
01/17/2015; 6:00 pm	at UT Martin	L 52–55	8–12 (1–5)	Skyhawk Arena (2,605); Martin, Tennessee
01/22/2015; 7:00 pm	Eastern Kentucky	W 71–67	9–12 (2–5)	Pete Mathews Coliseum (1,801); Jacksonville, Alabama
01/24/2015; 4:30 pm	Morehead State	L 63–66	9–13 (2–6)	Pete Mathews Coliseum (3,101); Jacksonville, Alabama
01/29/2015; 7:00 pm	at Belmont	L 82–103	9–14 (2–7)	Curb Event Center (1,562); Nashville, Tennessee
01/31/2015; 7:30 pm	at Tennessee State	L 43–45	9–15 (2–8)	Gentry Complex (2,138); Nashville, Tennessee
02/04/2015*; 7:00 pm, ESPN3	at Memphis	L 48–74	9–16	FedExForum (13,385); Memphis, Tennessee
02/07/2015; 7:30 pm	at Tennessee Tech	L 59–72	9–17 (2–9)	Eblen Center (2,068); Cookeville, Tennessee
02/11/2015; 8:00 pm	Belmont	W 72–70	10–17 (3–9)	Pete Mathews Coliseum (1,452); Jacksonville, Alabama
02/14/2015; 7:30 pm	Tennessee Tech	W 82–68	11–17 (4–9)	Pete Mathews Coliseum (1,011); Jacksonville, Alabama
02/21/2015; 4:30 pm	Tennessee State	W 55–50	12–17 (5–9)	Pete Mathews Coliseum (1,497); Jacksonville, Alabama
02/26/2015; 6:00 pm	at Eastern Kentucky	L 57–63	12–18 (5–10)	McBrayer Arena (2,600); Richmond, Kentucky
02/28/2015; 1:30 pm	at Morehead State	L 55–87	12–19 (5–11)	Ellis Johnson Arena (2,310); Morehead, Kentucky
*Non-conference game. ^{#}Rankings from AP Poll. (#) Tournament seedings in parentheses. All times are in Central Time.
