= 2014–15 UT Martin Skyhawks men's basketball team =

American college basketball season

2014–15 UT Martin Skyhawks men's basketball

CIT, Semifinals
- Conference: Ohio Valley Conference
- West Division
- Record: 21–13 (10–6 OVC)
- Head coach: Heath Schroyer (1st season)
- Assistant coaches: Anthony Stewart; Jermaine Johnson; John Aiken
- Home arena: Skyhawk Arena

2014–15 Ohio Valley Conference men's basketball standings
	Conf.				Overall
Team	W		L	PCT	W		L	PCT
East
Belmont †	11	–	5	.688	22	–	11	.667
Eastern Kentucky	11	–	5	.688	21	–	12	.636
Morehead State	10	–	6	.625	17	–	17	.500
Jacksonville State	5	–	11	.313	12	–	19	.387
Tennessee Tech	4	–	12	.250	12	–	18	.400
Tennessee State	2	–	14	.125	5	–	26	.161
West
Murray State	16	–	0	1.000	29	–	6	.829
UT Martin	10	–	6	.625	21	–	13	.618
Eastern Illinois	9	–	7	.563	18	–	15	.545
SIU Edwardsville	8	–	8	.500	12	–	16	.429
Southeast Missouri St.	7	–	9	.438	13	–	17	.433
Austin Peay	3	–	13	.188	8	–	22	.267
† 2015 OVC tournament winner Rankings from AP poll

The 2014–15 Tennessee–Martin Skyhawks men's basketball team represented the University of Tennessee at Martin during the 2014–15 NCAA Division I men's basketball season. The Skyhawks, led by first-year head coach Heath Schroyer, played their home games at Skyhawk Arena and were members of the West Division of the Ohio Valley Conference. They finished the season 21–13, 10–6 in OVC play to finish in second place in the West Division. They lost in the quarterfinals of the OVC tournament to Morehead State. They were invited to the CollegeInsider.com Tournament where they defeated Northwestern State in the first round, USC Upstate in the second round, and Eastern Kentucky in the quarterfinals. In the CIT semifinals, they lost to Evansville.

== Previous season ==
The Skyhawks finished the 2013–14 season 8–23, 3–13 in OVC play to finish in last place in the West Division and failed to qualify for the OVC tournament. Head coach Jason James was fired at the end of the season.

== Roster ==
Number	Name	Position	Height	Weight	Year	Hometown
0	CJ Davis	Guard	6–2	170	Freshman	Scottsdale, Arizona
1	Dee Oldham	Guard	6–4	180	Junior	Lebanon, Tennessee
2	Khristian Taylor	Guard	6–2	175	Senior	Akron, Ohio
3	Alex Anderson	Guard	5–11	180	Junior	Memphis, Tennessee
4	Richard Lee	Guard	6–4	200	Freshman	Lake Worth, Florida
10	Chandler Rowe	Forward	6–7	205	Sophomore	Indianapolis, Indiana
11	Terrence Durham	Guard	6–3	195	Junior	Memphis, Tennessee
12	Harrison Hawks	Guard	5–10	175	Freshman	South Fulton, Tennessee
15	Brandon Hitchman	Forward	6–9	215	Freshman	Stratford, England
20	Arkeem Joseph	Center	6–9	280	Junior	Brooklyn, New York
24	Deville Smith	Guard	6–4	175	Senior	Jackson, Mississippi
25	Marshun Newell	Guard	6–3	195	Senior	Memphis, Tennessee
30	Twymond Howard	Forward	6–6	210	Junior	Pearl, Mississippi
33	Myles Taylor	Forward	6–7	250	Senior	Little Rock, Arkansas
40	Javier Martinez	Forward	6–7	210	Sophomore	Saint Croix, U.S. Virgin Islands
44	Nick Detlev	Center	7–2	225	Freshman	Euclid, Ohio

== Schedule ==
Date time, TV	Opponent	Result	Record	Site (attendance) city, state
Exhibition
11/06/2014*; 7:00 pm	Blue Mountain	W 72–48		Skyhawk Arena; Martin, Tennessee
Regular season
11/14/2014*; 8:30 pm	at Marquette	L 63–79	0–1	BMO Harris Bradley Center (12,901); Milwaukee
11/17/2014*; 7:00 pm	at Arkansas State	W 75–73	1–1	Convocation Center (1,517); Jonesboro, Arkansas
11/20/2014*; 7:00 pm	Champion Baptist	W 115–29	2–1	Skyhawk Arena (1,451); Martin, Tennessee
11/25/2014*; 6:00 pm	at Bethune-Cookman	W 74–56	3–1	Moore Gymnasium (N/A); Daytona Beach, Florida
11/28/2014*; 7:00 pm, ESPN3	at Nebraska	L 64–75	3–2	Pinnacle Bank Arena (15,987); Lincoln, Nebraska
12/03/2014*; 6:00 pm, ESPN3	at Northern Kentucky	W 71–56	4–2	The Bank of Kentucky Center (1,272); Highland Heights, Kentucky
12/06/2014*; 4:00 pm	at Longwood	W 77–67	5–2	Willett Hall (N/A); Farmville, Virginia
12/15/2014*; 7:00 pm, ESPN3	at UIC	W 81–78 ^{OT}	6–2	UIC Pavilion (1,599); Chicago
12/17/2014*; 7:00 pm	at Illinois State	L 54–64	6–3	Redbird Arena (4,037); Normal, Illinois
12/20/2014*; 3:00 pm	Presbyterian	W 77–60	7–3	Skyhawk Arena (1,139); Martin, Tennessee
12/22/2014*; 6:00 pm, FS1	at Butler	L 37–64	7–4	Hinkle Fieldhouse (5,891); Indianapolis
12/30/2014*; 6:30 pm	Maryland Eastern Shore	L 60–63	7–5	Skyhawk Arena (917); Martin, Tennessee
01/01/2015*; 6:30 pm	Crowley's Ridge	W 84–61	8–5	Skyhawk Arena (727); Martin, Tennessee
01/08/2015; 7:30 pm	Eastern Kentucky	L 58–66	8–6 (0–1)	Skyhawk Arena (3,108); Martin, Tennessee
01/10/2015; 6:00 pm	Morehead State	W 75–72 ^{OT}	9–6 (1–1)	Skyhawk Arena (2,132); Martin, Tennessee
01/15/2015; 7:30 pm	at Tennessee Tech	W 63–60	10–6 (2–1)	Eblen Center (1,856); Cookeville, Tennessee
01/17/2015; 6:00 pm	Jacksonville State	W 55–52	11–6 (3–1)	Skyhawk Arena (2,605); Martin, Tennessee
01/22/2015; 7:00 pm	at Belmont	L 67–72	11–7 (3–2)	Curb Event Center (2,426); Nashville, Tennessee
01/24/2015; 6:00 pm	Southeast Missouri State	W 70–53	12–7 (4–2)	Skyhawk Arena (2,983); Martin, Tennessee
01/29/2015; 6:30 pm	Eastern Illinois	W 81–51	13–7 (5–2)	Skyhawk Arena (3,103); Martin, Tennessee
01/31/2015; 7:00 pm	at Murray State	L 62–65	13–8 (5–3)	CFSB Center (6,302); Murray, Kentucky
02/05/2015; 7:30 pm	at Austin Peay	W 76–64	14–8 (6–3)	Dunn Center (3,140); Clarksville, Tennessee
02/07/2015; 6:00 pm	SIU Edwardsville	W 64–59	15–8 (7–3)	Skyhawk Arena (2,417); Martin, Tennessee
02/12/2015; 8:00 pm, CBSSN	at Southeast Missouri State	L 76–98	15–9 (7–4)	Show Me Center (2,431); Cape Girardeau, Missouri
02/14/2015; 6:00 pm	Austin Peay	W 67–61	16–9 (8–4)	Skyhawk Arena (1,903); Martin, Tennessee
02/19/2015; 7:00 pm, ASN	at Eastern Illinois	W 75–73 ^{OT}	17–9 (9–4)	Lantz Arena (1,202); Charleston, Illinois
02/21/2015; 7:00 pm	at SIU Edwardsville	L 68–76	17–10 (9–5)	Vadalabene Center (1,810); Edwardsville, Illinois
02/26/2015; 7:00 pm	at Tennessee State	W 69–52	18–10 (10–5)	Gentry Complex (683); Nashville, Tennessee
02/28/2015; 6:00 pm	Murray State	L 67–73	18–11 (10–6)	Skyhawk Arena (5,000); Martin, Tennessee
Ohio Valley tournament
03/05/2015; 6:00 pm	vs. Morehead State; Quarterfinals	L 65–76	18–12	Nashville Municipal Auditorium (839); Nashville, Tennessee
CIT
03/19/2015*; 6:30 pm	at Northwestern State; First round	W 104–79	19–12	Prather Coliseum (2,712); Natchitoches, Louisiana
03/21/2015*; 5:00 pm, ESPN3	at USC Upstate; Second round	W 60–49	20–12	Hodge Center (688); Spartanburg, South Carolina
03/25/2015*; 6:00 pm	at Eastern Kentucky; Quarterfinals	W 70–69	21–12	McBrayer Arena (3,300); Richmond, Kentucky
03/31/2015*; 6:00 pm, CBSSN	at Evansville; Semifinals	L 66–79	21–13	Ford Center (3,008); Evansville, Indiana
*Non-conference game. ^{#}Rankings from AP Poll. (#) Tournament seedings in parentheses. All times are in Central Time.
