= 2014–15 Vanderbilt Commodores men's basketball team =

American college basketball season

2014–15 Vanderbilt Commodores men's basketball

NIT, Quarterfinals
- Conference: Southeastern Conference
- Record: 21–14 (9–9 SEC)
- Head coach: Kevin Stallings (16th season)
- Assistant coaches: Adam Cohen; Derrick Jones; Tom Richardson
- Home arena: Memorial Gymnasium

2014–15 Southeastern Conference men's basketball standings
| | Conf. | | | | Overall |
| Team | W | | L | PCT | W | | L | PCT |
|---|---|---|---|---|---|---|---|---|
| No. 1 Kentucky † | 18 | – | 0 | 1.000 | 38 | – | 1 | .974 |
| No. 21 Arkansas | 13 | – | 5 | .722 | 27 | – | 9 | .750 |
| LSU | 11 | – | 7 | .611 | 22 | – | 11 | .667 |
| Georgia | 11 | – | 7 | .611 | 21 | – | 12 | .636 |
| Texas A&M | 11 | – | 7 | .611 | 21 | – | 12 | .636 |
| Ole Miss | 11 | – | 7 | .611 | 21 | – | 13 | .618 |
| Vanderbilt | 9 | – | 9 | .500 | 21 | – | 14 | .600 |
| Alabama | 8 | – | 10 | .444 | 19 | – | 15 | .559 |
| Florida | 8 | – | 10 | .444 | 16 | – | 17 | .485 |
| Tennessee | 7 | – | 11 | .389 | 16 | – | 16 | .500 |
| South Carolina | 6 | – | 12 | .333 | 17 | – | 16 | .515 |
| Mississippi State | 6 | – | 12 | .333 | 13 | – | 19 | .406 |
| Auburn | 4 | – | 14 | .222 | 15 | – | 20 | .429 |
| Missouri | 3 | – | 15 | .167 | 9 | – | 23 | .281 |
† 2015 SEC tournament winner Rankings from AP poll

The 2014–15 Vanderbilt Commodores men's basketball team represented Vanderbilt University in the 2014–15 NCAA Division I men's basketball season. The team's head coach was Kevin Stallings, in his sixteenth season at Vanderbilt. The team played their home games at Memorial Gymnasium in Nashville, Tennessee, as a member of the Southeastern Conference. They finished the season 21–14, 9–9 in SEC play to finish in seventh place. They lost in the second round of the SEC tournament where they lost to Tennessee. They were invited to the National Invitation Tournament where they defeated Saint Mary's in the first round and South Dakota State in the second round before losing in the quarterfinals to Stanford.

== Previous season ==
Coach Kevin Stallings completed his fifteenth season by posting a 15–16 record during the 2013-14 season, where the Commodores finished tenth in the SEC. The Commodores lost to Mississippi State in the 1st round of the SEC tournament.

=== Departures ===
| Name | Number | Pos. | Height | Weight | Year | Hometown | Notes |
|---|---|---|---|---|---|---|---|
| Rod Odom | 0 | F | 6'9" | 215 | Senior | Central Islip, NY | Graduated |
| Eric McClellan | 1 | G | 6'4" | 180 | RS Sophomore | Austin, TX | Suspended |
| Kedren Johnson | 2 | G | 6'4" | 215 | Junior | Lewisburg, TN | Suspended |
| Kyle Fuller | 11 | G | 6'1" | 200 | Senior | Moreno Valley, CA | Graduated |
| Rob Cross | 12 | G | 6'0" | 195 | Senior | Chappaqua, NY | Graduated |
| Dai-Jon Parker | 24 | G | 6'3" | 190 | Senior | Baton Rouge, LA | Suspended |

=== Incoming transfers ===
| Name | Number | Pos. | Height | Weight | Year | Hometown | Previous School |
|---|---|---|---|---|---|---|---|
| Nolan Cressler | 42 | G | 6'4" | 198 | Junior | Pittsburgh, PA | Transferred from Cornell. Under NCAA transfer rules, Cressler will have to redshirt for the 2014–15 season. Will have two years of remaining eligibility. |

=== Class of 2014 signees ===
College recruiting information
| Name | Hometown | School | Height | Weight | Commit date |
|---|---|---|---|---|---|
| Riley LaChance; PG | Brookfield, Wisconsin | Brookfield Central | 6 ft 2 in (1.88 m) | 175 lb (79 kg) | Sep 30, 2013 |
| Riley LaChance; PG | Recruit ratings: Scout: Rivals: 247Sports: ESPN: | | | | |
| Wade Baldwin; PG | Hillsborough, New Jersey | St. Joseph | 6 ft 2 in (1.88 m) | 180 lb (82 kg) | Nov 13, 2013 |
| Wade Baldwin; PG | Recruit ratings: Scout: Rivals: 247Sports: ESPN: | | | | |
| Shelton Mitchell; PG | Waxhaw, North Carolina | Oak Hill Academy | 6 ft 3 in (1.91 m) | 185 lb (84 kg) | May 23, 2014 |
| Shelton Mitchell; PG | Recruit ratings: Scout: Rivals: 247Sports: ESPN: | | | | |
| Matthew Fisher-Davis; SG | Charlotte, North Carolina | Charlotte Christian School | 6 ft 5 in (1.96 m) | 175 lb (79 kg) | Sep 15, 2013 |
| Matthew Fisher-Davis; SG | Recruit ratings: Scout: Rivals: 247Sports: ESPN: | | | | |
| Jeff Roberson; SF | Houston, Texas | The Kinkaid School | 6 ft 6 in (1.98 m) | 195 lb (88 kg) | Mar 11, 2014 |
| Jeff Roberson; SF | Recruit ratings: Scout: Rivals: 247Sports: ESPN: | | | | |
Overall recruit ranking: Scout: 23 Rivals: 30
Note: In many cases, Scout, Rivals, 247Sports, On3, and ESPN may conflict in their listings of height and weight.; In these cases, the average was taken. ESPN grades are on a 100-point scale.; Sources: "Vanderbilt 2014 Basketball Commitments". Rivals.; "2014 Vanderbilt Basketball Commits". Scout.; "ESPN". ESPN.; "Scout.com Team Recruiting Rankings". Scout.; "2014 Team Ranking". Rivals.

== Roster ==
2014–15 Vanderbilt Commodores men's basketball team
Players
Coaches

| Pos. | # | Name | Height | Weight | Year | Hometown |
|---|---|---|---|---|---|---|
| G | 0 | Shelton Mitchell | 6 ft 3 in (1.91 m) | 186 lb (84 kg) | Fr | Waxhaw, North Carolina |
| C | 3 | Luke Kornet | 7 ft 0 in (2.13 m) | 235 lb (107 kg) | So | Lantana, Texas |
| G | 4 | Wade Baldwin IV | 6 ft 2 in (1.88 m) | 195 lb (88 kg) | Fr | Belle Mead, New Jersey |
| G/F | 5 | Matthew Fisher-Davis | 6 ft 5 in (1.96 m) | 173 lb (78 kg) | Fr | Charlotte, North Carolina |
| G | 10 | Nathan Watkins | 6 ft 5 in (1.96 m) | 195 lb (88 kg) | Jr | Brentwood, Tennessee |
| F | 11 | Jeff Roberson | 6 ft 6 in (1.98 m) | 206 lb (93 kg) | Fr | Houston, Texas |
| G | 13 | Riley LaChance | 6 ft 2 in (1.88 m) | 194 lb (88 kg) | Fr | Brookfield, Wisconsin |
| G | 14 | Carter Josephs | 6 ft 0 in (1.83 m) | 180 lb (82 kg) | Jr | San Antonio, Texas |
| C | 30 | Damian Jones | 6 ft 10 in (2.08 m) | 240 lb (109 kg) | So | Baton Rouge, Louisiana |
| F | 34 | Shelby Moats | 6 ft 8 in (2.03 m) | 225 lb (102 kg) | Jr | Waconia, Minnesota |
| F | 35 | James Siakam | 6 ft 7 in (2.01 m) | 225 lb (102 kg) | RS Sr | Douala, Cameroon |
| C | 40 | Josh Henderson | 6 ft 11 in (2.11 m) | 240 lb (109 kg) | RS Sr | Roanoke, Virginia |
| G | 42 | Nolan Cressler (redshirt) | 6 ft 4 in (1.93 m) | 204 lb (93 kg) | Jr | Pittsburgh, Pennsylvania |

Head coach

- Kevin Stallings (Purdue)

Assistant coach(es)

- Adam Cohen (Arizona)
- Derrick Jones (New Orleans)
- Tom Richardson (St. Xavier (IL))

Legend

- (C) Team captain
- (S) Suspended
- (I) Ineligible
- (W) Walk-on
- Injured
- Current redshirt

Roster
Last update: 2014-08-10

== Schedule ==
| Date time, TV | Rank^{#} | Opponent^{#} | Result | Record | Site (attendance) city, state |
Exhibition
| 11/06/2014*; 7:00 pm | | Illinois–Springfield | W 82–63 | | Memorial Gymnasium (7,407); Nashville, TN |
| 11/11/2014*; 7:00 pm | | Sewanee | W 67–38 | | Memorial Gymnasium (7,871); Nashville, TN |
Non-conference regular season
| 11/16/2014*; 2:00 pm | | Trevecca Nazarene | W 83–56 | 1–0 | Memorial Gymnasium (7,581); Nashville, TN |
| 11/20/2014*; 8:00 pm, FSN | | Lipscomb | W 72–62 | 2–0 | Memorial Gymnasium (8,415); Nashville, TN |
| 11/23/2014*; 6:00 pm, FSN | | Tennessee State; Barclays Center Classic | W 78–46 | 3–0 | Memorial Gymnasium (7,446); Nashville, TN |
| 11/25/2014*; 7:00 pm | | Norfolk State; Barclays Center Classic | W 63–53 | 4–0 | Memorial Gymnasium (7,504); Nashville, TN |
| 11/28/2014*; 6:00 pm, NBCSN | | vs. Rutgers; Barclays Center Classic semifinals | L 65–68 | 4–1 | Barclays Center (4,118); Brooklyn, NY |
| 11/29/2014*; 6:00 pm, NBCSN | | vs. La Salle; Barclays Center Classic 3rd place game | W 68–55 | 5–1 | Barclays Center (4,105); Brooklyn, NY |
| 12/04/2014*; 6:00 pm, ESPNU | | Baylor; Big 12/SEC Challenge | L 63–66 | 5–2 | Memorial Gymnasium (7,740); Nashville, TN |
| 12/13/2014*; 8:00 pm, SECN | | Purdue | W 81–71 | 6–2 | Memorial Gymnasium (9,565); Nashville, TN |
| 12/16/2014*; 8:00 pm, SECN | | Western Carolina | W 99–79 | 7–2 | Memorial Gymnasium (7,504); Nashville, TN |
| 12/20/2014*; 1:00 pm, ESPN3 | | at Georgia Tech | L 60–65 | 7–3 | Hank McCamish Pavilion (6,081); Atlanta, GA |
| 12/22/2014*; 7:00 pm | | Penn | W 79–50 | 8–3 | Memorial Gymnasium (8,084); Nashville, TN |
| 12/31/2014*; 1:00 pm, FSMW | | at Saint Louis | W 70–55 | 9–3 | Chaifetz Arena (8,194); St. Louis, MO |
| 01/03/2015*; 1:00 pm | | Yale | W 79–74 ^{2OT} | 10–3 | Memorial Gymnasium (10,103); Nashville, TN |
SEC Conference Season
| 01/06/2015; 8:00 pm, ESPNU | | Auburn | W 64–52 | 11–3 (1–0) | Memorial Gymnasium (10,502); Nashville, TN |
| 01/10/2015; 3:30 pm, SECN | | at No. 23 Arkansas | L 70–82 | 11–4 (1–1) | Bud Walton Arena (17,238); Fayetteville, AR |
| 01/14/2015; 8:00 pm, SECN | | Georgia | L 67–70 | 11–5 (1–2) | Memorial Gymnasium (9,203); Nashville, TN |
| 01/17/2015; 3:00 pm, FSN | | at Mississippi State | L 54–57 | 11–6 (1–3) | Humphrey Coliseum (6,568); Starkville, MS |
| 01/20/2015; 8:00 pm, SECN | | at No. 1 Kentucky | L 57–65 | 11–7 (1–4) | Rupp Arena (24,249); Lexington, KY |
| 01/24/2015; 5:00 pm, ESPNU | | LSU | L 75–79 ^{OT} | 11–8 (1–5) | Memorial Gymnasium (9,392); Nashville, TN |
| 01/27/2015; 6:00 pm, SECN | | at Georgia | L 62–70 | 11–9 (1–6) | Stegeman Coliseum (7,091); Athens, GA |
| 01/31/2015; 3:30 pm, SECN | | at Texas A&M | L 58–69 | 11–10 (1–7) | Reed Arena (12,722); College Station, TX |
| 02/03/2015; 8:00 pm, ESPN | | Florida | W 67–61 | 12–10 (2–7) | Memorial Gymnasium (9,815); Nashville, TN |
| 02/07/2015; 3:00 pm, FSN | | South Carolina | W 65–50 | 13–10 (3–7) | Memorial Gymnasium (9,259); Nashville, TN |
| 02/11/2015; 8:00 pm, SECN | | Tennessee | L 73–76 ^{OT} | 13–11 (3–8) | Memorial Gymnasium (11,892); Nashville, TN |
| 02/14/2015; 7:00 pm, ESPNU | | at Alabama | W 76–68 | 14–11 (4–8) | Coleman Coliseum (11,501); Tuscaloosa, AL |
| 02/18/2015; 6:00 pm, SECN | | at Florida | L 47–50 | 14–12 (4–9) | O'Connell Center (9,417); Gainesville, FL |
| 02/21/2015; 1:30 pm, SECN | | Missouri | W 76–51 | 15–12 (5–9) | Memorial Gymnasium (10,154); Nashville, TN |
| 02/26/2015; 6:00 pm, ESPN2 | | at Tennessee | W 73–65 | 16–12 (6–9) | Thompson–Boling Arena (13,536); Knoxville, TN |
| 02/28/2015; 3:30 pm, FSN | | Alabama | W 73–66 | 17–12 (7–9) | Memorial Gymnasium (9,928); Nashville, TN |
| 03/04/2015; 8:00 pm, SECN | | Mississippi State | W 66–56 | 18–12 (8–9) | Memorial Gymnasium (8,685); Nashville, TN |
| 03/07/2015; 8:00 pm, SECN | | at Ole Miss | W 86–77 | 19–12 (9–9) | Tad Smith Coliseum (8,862); Oxford, MS |
SEC tournament
| 03/12/2015; 6:00 p.m., SECN | | vs. Tennessee; Second round | L 61–67 | 19–13 | Bridgestone Arena (15,032); Nashville, TN |
NIT
| 03/18/2015*; 8:00 p.m., ESPN2 | No. (5) | at (4) Saint Mary's; First round | W 75–64 | 20–13 | McKeon Pavilion (1,322); Moraga, CA |
| 03/20/2015*; 8:30 p.m., ESPNU | No. (5) | (8) South Dakota State; Second round | W 92–77 | 21–13 | Memorial Gymnasium (5,605); Nashville, TN |
| 03/24/2015*; 8:00 p.m., ESPN | No. (5) | at (2) Stanford; Quarterfinals | L 75–78 | 21–14 | Maples Pavilion (1,546); Stanford, CA |
*Non-conference game. ^{#}Rankings from AP Poll. (#) Tournament seedings in parentheses. All times are in Central Time. (#) during NIT is seed within region.

== See also ==
2014–15 Vanderbilt Commodores women's basketball team
