= 2014–15 Tennessee State Tigers basketball team =

American college basketball season

2014–15 Tennessee State Tigers men's basketball
- Conference: Ohio Valley Conference
- East Division
- Record: 5–26 (2–14 OVC)
- Head coach: Dana Ford (1st season)
- Assistant coaches: Randy Peele; Rodney Hamilton; Pierre Jordan
- Home arena: Gentry Complex

2014–15 Ohio Valley Conference men's basketball standings
	Conf.				Overall
Team	W		L	PCT	W		L	PCT
East
Belmont †	11	–	5	.688	22	–	11	.667
Eastern Kentucky	11	–	5	.688	21	–	12	.636
Morehead State	10	–	6	.625	17	–	17	.500
Jacksonville State	5	–	11	.313	12	–	19	.387
Tennessee Tech	4	–	12	.250	12	–	18	.400
Tennessee State	2	–	14	.125	5	–	26	.161
West
Murray State	16	–	0	1.000	29	–	6	.829
UT Martin	10	–	6	.625	21	–	13	.618
Eastern Illinois	9	–	7	.563	18	–	15	.545
SIU Edwardsville	8	–	8	.500	12	–	16	.429
Southeast Missouri St.	7	–	9	.438	13	–	17	.433
Austin Peay	3	–	13	.188	8	–	22	.267
† 2015 OVC tournament winner Rankings from AP poll

The 2014–15 Tennessee State Tigers basketball team represented Tennessee State University during the 2014–15 NCAA Division I men's basketball season. The Tigers, led by first year head coach Dana Ford, played their home games at the Gentry Complex and were members of the East Division of the Ohio Valley Conference. They finished the season 5–26, 2–14 in OVC play to finish in last place in the East Division. They failed to qualify for the OVC Tournament.

== Roster ==
Number	Name	Position	Height	Weight	Year	Hometown
0	Zachary Lee	Forward	6–8	215	Freshman	Albuquerque, New Mexico
1	Tahjere McCall	Guard	6–4	160	Junior	Philadelphia
2	Marcus Roper	Guard	6–5	200	Junior	Fort Walton Beach, Florida
3	Rodney Simeon	Guard	6–5	190	Freshman	Miami
4	Xavier Richards	Guard	6–2	198	Junior	Saint Thomas, U.S. Virgin Islands
5	Jay Harris	Guard	5–10	170	Senior	Philadelphia
10	Charles Tucker	Guard	6–1	182	Freshman	Lansing, Michigan
11	Demontez Loman	Forward	6–6	188	Junior	South Port, North Carolina
14	Darreon Raddick	Guard	6–4	195	Freshman	Belleville, Illinois
15	Keron DeShields	Guard	6–2	195	Junior	Baltimore, Maryland
21	Christian Mekowulu	Forward	6–9	230	Freshman	Lagos, Nigeria
22	Chima Azuonwu	Center	6–11	290	Freshman	Delta State, Nigeria
23	Christian Crockett	Forward	6–6	215	Junior	Houston, Texas

== Schedule ==
Date time, TV	Opponent	Result	Record	Site (attendance) city, state
Regular Season
11/14/2014*; 7:00 pm	Reinhardt	W 97–66	1–0	Gentry Complex (1,238); Nashville, Tennessee
11/18/2014*; 7:00 pm	Southern Illinois	L 67–84	1–1	Gentry Complex (1,542); Nashville, Tennessee
11/20/2014*; 7:00 pm	Fisk	W 75–60	2–1	Gentry Complex (3,168); Nashville, Tennessee
11/23/2014*; 6:00 pm, FSN	at Vanderbilt; Barclays Center Classic	L 46–78	2–2	Memorial Gymnasium (7,446); Nashville, Tennessee
11/25/2014*; 6:00 pm, RSN	at No. 8 Virginia; Barclays Center Classic	L 36–79	2–3	John Paul Jones Arena (12,056); Charlottesville, Virginia
11/28/2014*; 7:30 pm	at Saint Peter's; Barclays Center Classic	L 58–66	2–4	Yanitelli Center (N/A); Jersey City, New Jersey
11/29/2014*; 5:00 pm	vs. St. Francis Brooklyn; Barclays Center Classic	L 57–59	2–5	Yanitelli Center (321); Jersey City, New Jersey
12/02/2014*; 7:00 pm	Hampton	L 54–62	2–6	Gentry Complex (1,221); Nashville, Tennessee
12/06/2014*; 4:00 pm, ESPN3	at Lipscomb	L 68–77	2–7	Allen Arena (804); Nashville, Tennessee
12/16/2014*; 7:00 pm	at Southern Illinois	L 58–65	2–8	SIU Arena (4,222); Carbondale, Illinois
12/19/2014*; 6:00 pm	at Hampton	L 54–66	2–9	Hampton Convocation Center (2,000); Hampton, Virginia
12/21/2014*; 2:00 pm	at Middle Tennessee	L 47–65	2–10	Murphy Center (3,672); Murfreesboro, Tennessee
12/27/2014*; 7:30 pm, SECN	at Tennessee	L 46–67	2–11	Thompson–Boling Arena (13,459); Knoxville, Tennessee
12/29/2014*; 7:00 pm	at No. 25 TCU	L 40–60	2–12	Wilkerson-Greines Activity Center (3,403); Fort Worth, Texas
12/31/2014*; 7:00 pm	Kennesaw State	W 73–62	3–12	Gentry Complex (304); Nashville, Tennessee
01/03/2015; 7:30 pm	Southeast Missouri State	L 62–77	3–13 (0–1)	Gentry Complex (988); Nashville, Tennessee
01/07/2015; 7:30 pm	Eastern Illinois	L 57–64	3–14 (0–2)	Gentry Complex (406); Nashville, Tennessee
01/10/2015; 7:00 pm	at SIU Edwardsville	L 38–45	3–15 (0–3)	Vadalabene Center (1,702); Edwardsville, Illinois
01/15/2015; 7:30 pm	at Austin Peay	L 68–69	3–16 (0–4)	Dunn Center (3,311); Clarksville, Tennessee
01/17/2015; 7:00 pm	at Murray State	L 72–91	3–17 (0–5)	CFSB Center (5,484); Murray, Kentucky
01/25/2015; 5:30 pm, ASN	Belmont	L 55–63	3–18 (0–6)	Gentry Complex (1,561); Nashville, Tennessee
01/29/2015; 7:00 pm	Tennessee Tech	W 64–56	4–18 (1–6)	Gentry Complex (768); Nashville, Tennessee
01/31/2015; 7:30 pm	Jacksonville State	W 45–43	5–18 (2–6)	Gentry Complex (2,138); Nashville, Tennessee
02/05/2015; 6:00 pm	at Morehead State	L 57–72	5–19 (2–7)	Ellis Johnson Arena (2,489); Morehead, Kentucky
02/07/2015; 6:00 pm	at Eastern Kentucky	L 72–77	5–20 (2–8)	McBrayer Arena (2,300); Richmond, Kentucky
02/12/2015; 7:00 pm, ASN	at Tennessee Tech	L 52–71	5–21 (2–9)	Eblen Center (2,231); Cookeville, Tennessee
02/14/2015; 7:30 pm	Eastern Kentucky	L 41–69	5–22 (2–10)	Gentry Complex (2,578); Nashville, Tennessee
02/21/2015; 4:30 pm	at Jacksonville State	L 50–55	5–23 (2–11)	Pete Mathews Coliseum (1,497); Jacksonville, Alabama
02/23/2015; 7:00 pm	Morehead State; Postponed from 2/19/15	L 70–86	5–24 (2–12)	Gentry Complex (783); Nashville, Tennessee
02/26/2015; 7:00 pm	UT Martin	L 52–69	5–25 (2–13)	Gentry Complex (683); Nashville, Tennessee
02/28/2015; 5:00 pm, CBSSN	at Belmont	L 62–88	5–26 (2–14)	Curb Event Center (3,835); Nashville, Tennessee
*Non-conference game. ^{#}Rankings from AP Poll. (#) Tournament seedings in parentheses. All times are in Central Time.
