= 2014–15 Belmont Bruins men's basketball team =

American college basketball season

2014–15 Belmont Bruins men's basketball

Ohio Valley East Division co–champions Ohio Valley Tournament champions

NCAA tournament, round of 64
- Conference: Ohio Valley Conference
- East Division
- Record: 22–11 (11–5 OVC)
- Head coach: Rick Byrd (29th season)
- Assistant coaches: Brian Ayers; James Strong; Mark Price
- Home arena: Curb Event Center

2014–15 Ohio Valley Conference men's basketball standings
| | Conf. | | | | Overall |
| Team | W | | L | PCT | W | | L | PCT |
|---|---|---|---|---|---|---|---|---|
East
| Belmont † | 11 | – | 5 | .688 | 22 | – | 11 | .667 |
| Eastern Kentucky | 11 | – | 5 | .688 | 21 | – | 12 | .636 |
| Morehead State | 10 | – | 6 | .625 | 17 | – | 17 | .500 |
| Jacksonville State | 5 | – | 11 | .313 | 12 | – | 19 | .387 |
| Tennessee Tech | 4 | – | 12 | .250 | 12 | – | 18 | .400 |
| Tennessee State | 2 | – | 14 | .125 | 5 | – | 26 | .161 |
West
| Murray State | 16 | – | 0 | 1.000 | 29 | – | 6 | .829 |
| UT Martin | 10 | – | 6 | .625 | 21 | – | 13 | .618 |
| Eastern Illinois | 9 | – | 7 | .563 | 18 | – | 15 | .545 |
| SIU Edwardsville | 8 | – | 8 | .500 | 12 | – | 16 | .429 |
| Southeast Missouri St. | 7 | – | 9 | .438 | 13 | – | 17 | .433 |
| Austin Peay | 3 | – | 13 | .188 | 8 | – | 22 | .267 |
† 2015 OVC tournament winner Rankings from AP poll

The 2014–15 Belmont Bruins men's basketball team represented Belmont University during the 2014–15 NCAA Division I men's basketball season. The Bruins, led by 29th year head coach Rick Byrd, played their home games at the Curb Event Center and were members of the Ohio Valley Conference in the East Division. They finished the season 22–11, 11–5 in OVC play to finish a tie for the East Division championship. They defeated Eastern Kentucky and Murray State to be champions of the Ohio Valley tournament. They received an automatic bid to the NCAA tournament where they lost in the second round to Virginia.

== Roster ==
2014–15 Belmont Bruins men's basketball team
Players
Coaches

| Pos. | # | Name | Height | Weight | Year | Hometown |
|---|---|---|---|---|---|---|
| G | 1 | Austin Luke | 6 ft 3 in (1.91 m) | 185 lb (84 kg) | RS Fr | Rowlett, Texas |
| F | 2 | Nick Smith | 6 ft 8 in (2.03 m) | 215 lb (98 kg) | So | Bentonville, Arkansas |
| G | 4 | Holden Mobley | 6 ft 3 in (1.91 m) | 205 lb (93 kg) | RS Sr | Nashville, Tennessee |
| G | 5 | Caleb Chowbay | 6 ft 2 in (1.88 m) | 175 lb (79 kg) | RS So | Mt. Juliet, Tennessee |
| G | 11 | Spencer Turner | 6 ft 3 in (1.91 m) | 190 lb (86 kg) | Sr | Bloomington, Indiana |
| G | 20 | Taylor Barnette | 6 ft 3 in (1.91 m) | 185 lb (84 kg) | So | Lexington, Kentucky |
| G | 21 | Burton Sampson | 6 ft 4 in (1.93 m) | 195 lb (88 kg) | RS Fr | Knoxville, Tennessee |
| G | 22 | Reece Chamberlain | 6 ft 1 in (1.85 m) | 180 lb (82 kg) | RS Sr | Goodlettsville, Tennessee |
| G | 23 | Craig Bradshaw | 6 ft 3 in (1.91 m) | 210 lb (95 kg) | Jr | Franklin, Tennessee |
| F | 25 | Mack Mercer | 6 ft 9 in (2.06 m) | 220 lb (100 kg) | Fr | Plymouth, Indiana |
| F | 31 | Josh Lester | 6 ft 6 in (1.98 m) | 225 lb (102 kg) | RS Fr | Antioch, Tennessee |
| F | 35 | Evan Bradds | 6 ft 6 in (1.98 m) | 205 lb (93 kg) | RS So | Jamestown, Ohio |
| C | 41 | Tyler Hadden | 6 ft 10 in (2.08 m) | 235 lb (107 kg) | RS Fr | Cincinnati |
| F | 43 | Jeff Laidig | 6 ft 4 in (1.93 m) | 210 lb (95 kg) | Jr | Mishawaka, Indiana |

Head coach

- Rick Byrd (Tennessee)

Assistant coach(es)

- Brian Ayers (Lipscomb)
- James Strong (Vanderbilt)
- Mark Price (Samford)

Legend

- (C) Team captain
- (S) Suspended
- (I) Ineligible
- (W) Walk-on
- Injured
- Current redshirt

Roster
Last update: 2014-9-17

== Schedule ==
| Date time, TV | Rank^{#} | Opponent^{#} | Result | Record | Site (attendance) city, state |
Regular season
| 11/14/2014*; 6:00 pm | | at Wright State | L 70–73 | 0–1 | Nutter Center (5,437); Fairborn, Ohio |
| 11/17/2014*; 6:30 pm | | at Lipscomb | W 87–62 | 1–1 | Allen Arena (4,734); Nashville, Tennessee |
| 11/19/2014*; 7:00 pm | | Trevecca Nazarene | W 96–76 | 2–1 | Curb Event Center (2,478); Nashville, Tennessee |
| 11/22/2014*; 7:00 pm | | at WKU | W 64–63 | 3–1 | E. A. Diddle Arena (5,194); Bowling Green, Kentucky |
| 11/24/2014*; 7:00 pm | | Lipscomb | W 82–77 | 4–1 | Curb Event Center (3,018); Nashville, Tennessee |
| 11/26/2014*; 1:00 pm | | Denver | W 78–57 | 5–1 | Curb Event Center (1,035); Nashville, Tennessee |
| 11/29/2014*; 6:00 pm | | at Ohio | W 83–81 | 6–1 | Convocation Center (5,611); Athens, Ohio |
| 12/02/2014*; 7:00 pm | | Middle Tennessee | W 63–59 | 7–1 | Curb Event Center (1,608); Nashville, Tennessee |
| 12/09/2014*; 7:00 pm | | Evansville | L 62–65 | 7–2 | Curb Event Center (1,160); Nashville, Tennessee |
| 12/11/2014*; 6:00 pm | | Wright State | L 71–79 | 7–3 | Curb Event Center (1,234); Nashville, Tennessee |
| 12/16/2014*; 6:00 pm | | at VCU | L 51–78 | 7–4 | Stuart C. Siegel Center (N/A); Richmond, Virginia |
| 12/20/2014*; 12:30 pm | | at Fairfield | W 73–61 | 8–4 | Webster Bank Arena (1,571); Bridgeport, Connecticut |
| 12/28/2014*; 5:00 pm, FS1 | | at Butler | L 56–67 | 8–5 | Hinkle Fieldhouse (7,752); Indianapolis |
| 01/01/2015; 1:00 pm | | Southeast Missouri State | W 78–77 | 9–5 (1–0) | Curb Event Center (1,597); Nashville, Tennessee |
| 01/07/2015; 8:00 pm, CBSSN | | SIU Edwardsville | W 73–69 | 10–5 (2–0) | Curb Event Center (1,696); Nashville, Tennessee |
| 01/10/2015; 3:15 pm | | at Eastern Illinois | L 73–84 | 10–6 (2–1) | Lantz Arena (1,204); Charleston, Illinois |
| 01/15/2015; 8:00 pm, ESPNU | | at Murray State | L 77–92 | 10–7 (2–2) | CFSB Center (5,960); Murray, Kentucky |
| 01/17/2015; 7:30 pm | | at Austin Peay | W 89–83 | 11–7 (3–2) | Dunn Center (3,905); Clarksville, Tennessee |
| 01/22/2015; 7:00 pm | | UT Martin | W 72–67 | 12–7 (4–2) | Curb Event Center (2,426); Nashville, Tennessee |
| 01/25/2015; 7:30 pm, ASN | | at Tennessee State | W 63–55 | 13–7 (5–2) | Gentry Complex (1,561); Nashville, Tennessee |
| 01/29/2015; 7:00 pm | | Jacksonville State | W 103–82 | 14–7 (6–2) | Curb Event Center (1,562); Nashville, Tennessee |
| 01/31/2015; 2:00 pm | | Tennessee Tech | W 71–53 | 15–7 (7–2) | Curb Event Center (2,194); Nashville, Tennessee |
| 02/05/2015; 8:00 pm, ESPNU | | at Eastern Kentucky | L 69–81 | 15–8 (7–3) | McBrayer Arena (4,700); Richmond, Kentucky |
| 02/07/2015; 6:30 pm | | at Morehead State | L 71–73 | 15–9 (7–4) | Ellis Johnson Arena (4,489); Morehead, Kentucky |
| 02/11/2015; 8:00 pm | | at Jacksonville State | L 70–72 | 15–10 (7–5) | Pete Mathews Coliseum (1,452); Jacksonville, Alabama |
| 02/14/2015; 6:00 pm | | Morehead State | W 58–57 | 16–10 (8–5) | Curb Event Center (2,046); Nashville, Tennessee |
| 02/19/2015; 7:00 pm | | Eastern Kentucky | W 66–61 | 17–10 (9–5) | Curb Event Center (1,904); Nashville, Tennessee |
| 02/21/2015; 7:30 pm | | at Tennessee Tech | W 88–82 | 18–10 (10–5) | Eblen Center (1,614); Cookeville, Tennessee |
| 02/28/2015; 5:00 pm, CBSSN | | Tennessee State | W 88–62 | 19–10 (11–5) | Curb Event Center (3,835); Nashville, Tennessee |
Ohio Valley tournament
| 03/05/2015; 8:00 pm | | vs. Eastern Illinois; Quarterfinals | W 97–64 | 20–10 | Nashville Municipal Auditorium (839); Nashville, Tennessee |
| 03/06/2015; 8:30 pm, ESPNU | | vs. Eastern Kentucky; Semifinals | W 53–52 | 21–10 | Nashville Municipal Auditorium (3,753); Nashville, Tennessee |
| 03/07/2015; 6:00 pm, ESPN2 | | vs. No. 25 Murray State; Championship game | W 88–87 | 22–10 | Nashville Municipal Auditorium (5,293); Nashville, Tennessee |
NCAA tournament
| 03/20/2015*; 2:10 pm, truTV | (15 E) | vs. (2 E) No. 6 Virginia; Second round | L 67–79 | 22–11 | Time Warner Cable Arena (16,551); Charlotte, North Carolina |
*Non-conference game. ^{#}Rankings from AP Poll. (#) Tournament seedings in parentheses. E=East Region. All times are in Central Time.
