= 2014–15 Southeast Missouri State Redhawks men's basketball team =

American college basketball season

2014–15 Southeast Missouri State Redhawks men's basketball
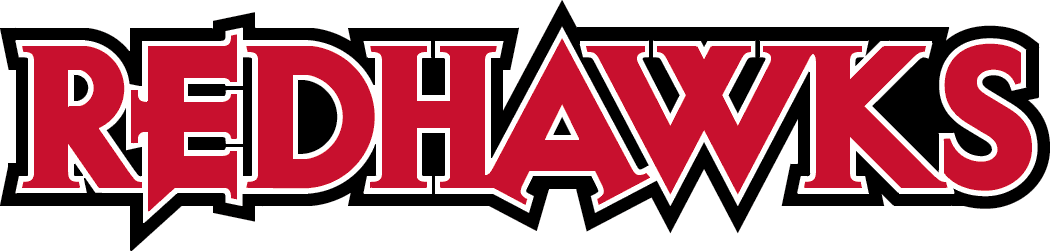
- Conference: Ohio Valley Conference
- West Division
- Record: 13–17 (7–9 OVC)
- Head coach: Dickey Nutt (6th season)
- Assistant coaches: Jamie Rosser; Stetson Hairston; Justin Argenal
- Home arena: Show Me Center

2014–15 Ohio Valley Conference men's basketball standings
	Conf.				Overall
Team	W		L	PCT	W		L	PCT
East
Belmont †	11	–	5	.688	22	–	11	.667
Eastern Kentucky	11	–	5	.688	21	–	12	.636
Morehead State	10	–	6	.625	17	–	17	.500
Jacksonville State	5	–	11	.313	12	–	19	.387
Tennessee Tech	4	–	12	.250	12	–	18	.400
Tennessee State	2	–	14	.125	5	–	26	.161
West
Murray State	16	–	0	1.000	29	–	6	.829
UT Martin	10	–	6	.625	21	–	13	.618
Eastern Illinois	9	–	7	.563	18	–	15	.545
SIU Edwardsville	8	–	8	.500	12	–	16	.429
Southeast Missouri St.	7	–	9	.438	13	–	17	.433
Austin Peay	3	–	13	.188	8	–	22	.267
† 2015 OVC tournament winner Rankings from AP poll

The 2014–15 Southeast Missouri State Redhawks men's basketball team represented Southeast Missouri State University during the 2014–15 NCAA Division I men's basketball season. The Redhawks, led by sixth year head coach Dickey Nutt, played their home games at the Show Me Center and were members of the West Division of the Ohio Valley Conference. They finished the season 13–17, 7–9 in OVC play to finish in fifth place in the West Division. They lost in the first round of the OVC tournament to Morehead State.

On March 23, head coach Dicky Nutt was fired. He finished at SEMO with a six-year record of 67–91.

== Roster ==
Number	Name	Position	Height	Weight	Year	Hometown
0	Josh Langford	Guard	6–7	215	Senior	Huntsville, Alabama
1	Nino Johnson	Forward	6–9	245	Senior	Memphis, Tennessee
2	Paul McRoberts	Forward	6–3	192	Sophomore	St. Louis, Missouri
3	C. J. Reese	Guard	6–2	195	Sophomore	Atlanta, Georgia
4	Antonius Cleveland	Guard	6–6	175	Sophomore	Memphis, Tennessee
12	Jamaal Calvin	Guard	6–1	181	Sophomore	Chattanooga, Tennessee
15	Darrian Gray	Guard	6–5	213	Senior	Memphis, Tennessee
23	Jarekious Bradley	Guard/Forward	6–5	220	Senior	Memphis, Tennessee
41	Caleb Woods	Forward/Center	6–3	180	Senior	Selmer, Tennessee
55	J.J. Thompson	Guard	6–0	185	Junior	Irving, Texas
	Aaron Adeoye	Guard	6–7	237	Senior	Marion, Illinois
	Ladarius Coleman	Guard/Forward	6–5	200	Freshman	Memphis, Tennessee
	Isiah Jones	Guard	6–4	193	Junior	Pulaski, Illinois
	J.T. Jones	Guard	6–3	200	Freshman	Sikeston, Missouri
	Trey Kellum	Forward	6–7	215	Junior	Peoria, Illinois
	TJ Thomas	Forward	6–8	200	Freshman	Chicago, Illinois
	Marcus Wallace	Guard	6–1	175	Freshman	Little Rock, Arkansas

== Schedule ==
Date time, TV	Opponent	Result	Record	Site (attendance) city, state
Exhibition
11/03/2014*; 7:00 pm	Missouri Baptist	W 97–69		Show Me Center (1,555); Cape Girardeau, MO
11/08/2014*; 6:00 pm	Fontbonne	W 103–61		Show Me Center (1,496); Cape Girardeau, MO
Regular season
11/14/2014*; 8:00 pm	at Loyola Marymount; LMU Classic	L 66–76	0–1	Gersten Pavilion (1,703); Los Angeles, CA
11/15/2014*; 4:30 pm	vs. San Diego; LMU Classic	L 56–67	0–2	Gersten Pavilion (1,362); Los Angeles, CA
11/18/2014*; 7:00 pm	Hannibal–LaGrange	W 86–49	1–2	Show Me Center (1,623); Cape Girardeau, MO
11/22/2014*; 3:00 pm	at Central Arkansas	W 74–64	2–2	Farris Center (748); Conway, AR
11/25/2014*; 6:00 pm	at Bowling Green	L 54–62	2–3	Stroh Center (1,284); Bowling Green, OH
11/29/2014*; 6:00 pm	Alabama A&M	W 85–51	3–3	Show Me Center (1,103); Cape Girardeau, MO
12/02/2014*; 7:00 pm, SECN+	at Missouri	L 61–65	3–4	Mizzou Arena (5,506); Columbia, MO
12/06/2014*; 6:00 pm	Southeastern Louisiana	W 63–59	4–4	Show Me Center (1,288); Cape Girardeau, MO
12/10/2014*; 7:00 pm	Southern Illinois	W 55–54	5–4	Show Me Center (3,507); Cape Girardeau, MO
12/13/2014*; 6:00 pm	Missouri State	L 61–73	5–5	Show Me Center (3,043); Cape Girardeau, MO
12/20/2014*; 7:30 pm, SECN	vs. Arkansas	L 67–84	5–6	Verizon Arena (11,375); Little Rock, AR
12/22/2014*; 7:00 pm	vs. Ole Miss; Southaven Showcase	L 51–82	5–7	Southaven Arena (2,222); Southaven, MS
12/28/2014*; 2:00 pm	Harris–Stowe State	W 94–66	6–7	Show Me Center (1,549); Cape Girardeau, MO
01/01/2015; 1:00 pm	at Belmont	L 77–78	6–8 (0–1)	Curb Event Center (1,597); Nashville, TN
01/03/2015; 7:45 pm	at Tennessee State	W 77–62	7–8 (1–1)	Gentry Complex (988); Nashville, TN
01/08/2015; 7:30 pm	Morehead State	L 57–70	7–9 (1–2)	Show Me Center (1,724); Cape Girardeau, MO
01/10/2015; 6:00 pm	Eastern Kentucky	L 55–68	7–10 (1–3)	Show Me Center (1,924); Cape Girardeau, MO
01/14/2015; 8:00 pm	at Jacksonville State	W 69–52	8–10 (2–3)	Pete Mathews Coliseum (1,598); Jacksonville, AL
01/17/2015; 6:00 pm	Tennessee Tech	W 65–61	9–10 (3–3)	Show Me Center (2,964); Cape Girardeau, MO
01/24/2015; 6:00 pm	at UT Martin	L 53–70	9–11 (3–4)	Skyhawk Arena (2,983); Martin, TN
01/29/2015; 7:00 pm	SIU Edwardsville	L 61–75	9–12 (3–5)	Show Me Center (2,095); Cape Girardeau, MO
01/31/2015; 7:00 pm	at Austin Peay	W 70–54	10–12 (4–5)	Dunn Center (3,577); Clarksville, TN
02/05/2015; 7:00 pm	at Murray State	L 72–82	10–13 (4–6)	CFSB Center (4,184); Murray, KY
02/07/2015; 6:00 pm	Eastern Illinois	W 68–64	11–13 (5–6)	Show Me Center (1,754); Cape Girardeau, MO
02/12/2015; 7:00 pm, CBSSN	UT Martin	W 98–76	12–13 (6–6)	Show Me Center (2,431); Cape Girardeau, MO
02/14/2015; 6:00 pm	Murray State	L 92–94 ^{OT}	12–14 (6–7)	Show Me Center (3,218); Cape Girardeau, MO
02/19/2015; 7:00 pm	at SIU Edwardsville	L 72–75	12–15 (6–8)	Vadalabene Center (1,221); Edwardsville, IL
02/22/2015; 5:30 pm, ASN	at Eastern Illinois	L 65–73	12–16 (6–9)	Lantz Arena (1,322); Charleston, IL
02/28/2015; 6:00 pm	Austin Peay	W 89–65	13–16 (7–9)	Show Me Center (2,881); Cape Girardeau, MO
Ohio Valley tournament
03/04/2015; 6:00 pm	vs. Morehead State; First round	L 74–79	13–17	Nashville Municipal Auditorium (723); Nashville, TN
*Non-conference game. ^{#}Rankings from AP Poll. (#) Tournament seedings in parentheses. All times are in Central Time.
