= 2014–15 Austin Peay Governors basketball team =

American college basketball season

2014–15 Austin Peay Governors men's basketball
- Conference: Ohio Valley Conference
- West Division
- Record: 8–22 (3–13 OVC)
- Head coach: Dave Loos (25th season)
- Assistant coaches: Corey Gipson; Charles Wells
- Home arena: Dunn Center

2014–15 Ohio Valley Conference men's basketball standings
	Conf.				Overall
Team	W		L	PCT	W		L	PCT
East
Belmont †	11	–	5	.688	22	–	11	.667
Eastern Kentucky	11	–	5	.688	21	–	12	.636
Morehead State	10	–	6	.625	17	–	17	.500
Jacksonville State	5	–	11	.313	12	–	19	.387
Tennessee Tech	4	–	12	.250	12	–	18	.400
Tennessee State	2	–	14	.125	5	–	26	.161
West
Murray State	16	–	0	1.000	29	–	6	.829
UT Martin	10	–	6	.625	21	–	13	.618
Eastern Illinois	9	–	7	.563	18	–	15	.545
SIU Edwardsville	8	–	8	.500	12	–	16	.429
Southeast Missouri St.	7	–	9	.438	13	–	17	.433
Austin Peay	3	–	13	.188	8	–	22	.267
† 2015 OVC tournament winner Rankings from AP poll

The 2014–15 Austin Peay Governors basketball team represented Austin Peay State University during the 2014–15 NCAA Division I men's basketball season. The Governors, led by 25th year head coach Dave Loos, played their home games at the Dunn Center and were members of the West Division of the Ohio Valley Conference. They finished the season 8–22, 3–13 in OVC play to finish in last place in the West Division. They failed to qualify for the OVC Tournament.

== Roster ==
Number	Name	Position	Height	Weight	Year	Hometown
1	Assane Diop	Forward/Center	6–8	200	Sophomore	Dakar, Senegal
2	Zavion Williams	Guard	5–10	170	RS–Junior	Clarksville, Tennessee
3	Chris Porter-Bunton	Guard/Forward	6–4	195	Freshman	Bowling Green, Kentucky
4	Josh Robinson	Guard	6–3	180	Freshman	St. Louis, Missouri
5	Chris Horton	Center/Forward	6–8	195	Junior	Decatur, Georgia
10	Tre' Ivory	Guard	5–11	175	Freshman	Louisville, Kentucky
11	Khalil Davis	Guard	6–5	175	Junior	Kansas City, Missouri
12	Jeremy Purvis	Guard	5–10	150	Senior	Clarksville, Tennessee
15	Chris Freeman	Forward	6–6	205	Senior	San Antonio
20	Domas Budrys	Guard	6–4	185	Freshman	Kretinga, Lithuania
22	Damarius Smith	Guard	6–2	190	Senior	Clarksville, Tennessee
23	Serigne Mboup	Forward/Center	6–7	190	Junior	Dakar, Senegal
24	Ed Dyson	Forward	6–4	190	Senior	Washington, D.C.
25	Josh Ledbetter	Forward	6–6	200	Sophomore	Shepherd, Michigan

== Schedule ==
Date time, TV	Opponent	Result	Record	Site (attendance) city, state
Exhibition
11/01/2014*; 6:00 pm	Webster	W 82–48		Dunn Center (1,560); Clarksville, Tennessee
11/05/2014*; 7:00 pm	Bryan	W 63–52		Dunn Center (1,115); Clarksville, Tennessee
Regular Season
11/15/2014*; 4:00 pm	at WKU	L 70–77	0–1	E. A. Diddle Arena (4,572); Bowling Green, Kentucky
11/16/2014*; 3:00 pm, GovTV	Berea	W 68–63	1–1	Dunn Center (1,631); Clarksville, Tennessee
11/19/2014*; 7:00 pm	at Samford	L 67–68	1–2	Pete Hanna Center (889); Homewood, Alabama
11/21/2014*; 7:00 pm, ESPN3	at Illinois; Las Vegas Invitational	L 66–107	1–3	State Farm Center (16,337); Champaign, Illinois
11/24/2014*; 5:30 pm	at Indiana State; Las Vegas Invitational	L 57–61	1–4	Hulman Center (N/A); Terre Haute, Indiana
11/27/2014*; 1:00 pm	vs. Brown; Las Vegas Invitational	W 79–58	2–4	Orleans Arena (355); Paradise, Nevada
11/28/2014*; 4:00 pm	vs. Stephen F. Austin; Las Vegas Invitational	L 62–83	2–5	Orleans Arena (665); Paradise, Nevada
12/06/2014*; 7:00 pm	at Southern Illinois	L 49–71	2–6	SIU Arena (5,142); Carbondale, Illinois
12/13/2014*; 4:00 pm, GovTV	Lipscomb	L 59–68	2–7	Dunn Center (2,086); Clarksville, Tennessee
12/15/2014*; 7:00 pm, GovTV	Troy	W 73–70	3–7	Dunn Center (1886); Clarksville, Tennessee
12/18/2014*; 7:00 pm, GovTV	Oakland City	W 76–52	4–7	Dunn Center (1,023); Clarksville, Tennessee
12/21/2014*; 2:00 pm	at Lipscomb	L 63–69	4–8	Allen Arena (502); Nashville, Tennessee
12/31/2014*; 2:00 pm, GovTV	North Florida	W 65–60	5–8	Dunn Center (1,802); Clarksville, Tennessee
01/03/2015*; 1:00 pm	at Ole Miss	L 63–92	5–9	Tad Smith Coliseum (6,950); Oxford, Mississippi
01/08/2015; 8:00 pm	at Jacksonville State	L 59–71	5–10 (0–1)	Pete Mathews Coliseum (1,801); Jacksonville, Alabama
01/10/2015; 7:30 pm	at Tennessee Tech	L 56–72	5–11 (0–2)	Eblen Center (2,554); Cookeville, Tennessee
01/15/2015; 7:30 pm, GovTV	Tennessee State	W 69–68	6–11 (1–2)	Dunn Center (3,311); Clarksville, Tennessee
01/17/2015; 7:30 pm, GovTV	Belmont	L 83–89	6–12 (1–3)	Dunn Center (3,905); Clarksville, Tennessee
01/22/2015; 7:00 pm	at SIU Edwardsville	L 65–69	6–13 (1–4)	Vadalabene Center (1,305); Edwardsville, Illinois
01/24/2015; 3:15 pm	at Eastern Illinois	W 56–52	7–13 (2–4)	Lantz Arena (2,103); Charleston, Illinois
01/28/2015; 7:00 pm, GovTV	Morehead State	L 69–82	7–14 (2–5)	Dunn Center (2,265); Clarksville, Tennessee
01/31/2015; 7:00 pm, GovTV	Southeast Missouri State	L 64–70	7–15 (2–6)	Dunn Center (3,577); Clarksville, Tennessee
02/05/2015; 7:30 pm, GovTV	UT Martin	L 64–76	7–16 (2–7)	Dunn Center (3,140); Clarksville, Tennessee
02/07/2015; 7:00 pm, GovTV	Murray State	L 72–82	7–17 (2–8)	Dunn Center (6,131); Clarksville, Tennessee
02/12/2015; 5:15 pm, GovTV	Eastern Illinois	L 55–66	7–18 (2–9)	Dunn Center (1,186); Clarksville, Tennessee
02/14/2015; 6:00 pm	at UT Martin	L 61–67	7–19 (2–10)	Skyhawk Arena (1,903); Martin, Tennessee
02/17/2015; 6:00 pm	at Eastern Kentucky			McBrayer Arena; Richmond, Kentucky
02/21/2015; 1:00 pm	at Murray State	L 54–89	7–20 (2–11)	CFSB Center (5,952); Murray, Kentucky
02/22/2015; 6:00 pm	at Eastern Kentucky	L 64–76	7–21 (2–12)	McBrayer Arena (1,300); Richmond, Kentucky
02/26/2015; 7:00 pm, ASN	SIU Edwardsville	W 64–61	8–21 (3–12)	Dunn Center (1,375); Clarksville, Tennessee
02/28/2015; 6:00 pm	at Southeast Missouri State	L 65–89	8–22 (3–13)	Show Me Center (2,881); Cape Girardeau, Missouri
*Non-conference game. ^{#}Rankings from AP Poll. (#) Tournament seedings in parentheses. All times are in Central Time.
