= 2014–15 Tennessee Tech Golden Eagles men's basketball team =

American college basketball season

2014–15 Tennessee Tech Golden Eagles men's basketball
- Conference: Ohio Valley Conference
- East Division
- Record: 12–18 (4–12 OVC)
- Head coach: Steve Payne (4th season)
- Assistant coaches: Rick Cabrera; Frank Davis; Ron Jirsa
- Home arena: Eblen Center

2014–15 Ohio Valley Conference men's basketball standings
	Conf.				Overall
Team	W		L	PCT	W		L	PCT
East
Belmont †	11	–	5	.688	22	–	11	.667
Eastern Kentucky	11	–	5	.688	21	–	12	.636
Morehead State	10	–	6	.625	17	–	17	.500
Jacksonville State	5	–	11	.313	12	–	19	.387
Tennessee Tech	4	–	12	.250	12	–	18	.400
Tennessee State	2	–	14	.125	5	–	26	.161
West
Murray State	16	–	0	1.000	29	–	6	.829
UT Martin	10	–	6	.625	21	–	13	.618
Eastern Illinois	9	–	7	.563	18	–	15	.545
SIU Edwardsville	8	–	8	.500	12	–	16	.429
Southeast Missouri St.	7	–	9	.438	13	–	17	.433
Austin Peay	3	–	13	.188	8	–	22	.267
† 2015 OVC tournament winner Rankings from AP poll

The 2014–15 Tennessee Tech Golden Eagles men's basketball team represented Tennessee Technological University during the 2014–15 NCAA Division I men's basketball season. The Golden Eagles, led by fourth-year head coach Steve Payne, played their home games at the Eblen Center and were members of the East Division of the Ohio Valley Conference. They finished the season 12–18, 4–12 in OVC play to finish in fifth place in the East Division. They failed to qualify for the OVC Tournament.

== Roster ==
Number	Name	Position	Height	Weight	Year	Hometown
0	Shirmane Thomas	Guard	6–2	175	Sophomore	Homer, Louisiana
1	Jordan Johnson	Guard	6–0	180	Senior	Hinesville, Georgia
4	DeOndre Haynes	Guard	6–3	180	RS sophomore	Calera, Alabama
5	Javon McKay	Guard/forward	6–5	195	Senior	Atlanta
12	Torrance Rowe	Guard	6–1	175	Junior	Atlanta
13	Ryan Martin	Forward	6–9	215	Junior	London, England
14	Aleksa Jugovic	Guard	6–3	185	Freshman	Leskovac, Serbia
15	Josh Bougher	Guard	6–4	195	Freshman	Memphis, Tennessee
20	Savonte Frazier	Guard	6–0	180	Freshman	Lake Wales, Florida
23	Josiah Moore	Guard	6–5	215	RS junior	Atlanta
25	Mason Ramsey	Forward	6–6	220	RS freshman	Livingston, Tennessee
32	Dwan Caldwell	Center	6–8	245	Senior	Los Angeles
33	Charles Jackson	Center	6–10	225	Junior	Sacramento, California
35	Anthony Morse	Forward	6–9	215	Junior	Lawrenceville, Georgia

== Schedule ==
Date time, TV	Opponent	Result	Record	Site (attendance) city, state
Exhibition
11/06/2014*; 7:30 pm	Bluefield	W 93–54		Eblen Center; Cookeville, Tennessee
Regular season
11/14/2014*; 6:00 pm	Piedmont International	W 83–29	1–0	Eblen Center (942); Cookeville, Tennessee
11/17/2014*; 10:00 pm, P12N	at USC	L 58–70	1–1	Galen Center (2,267); Los Angeles
11/22/2014*; 6:00 pm	Chattanooga	W 69–67	2–1	Eblen Center (1,276); Cookeville, Tennessee
11/24/2014*; 6:00 pm	Southeastern Louisiana; Green Wave Classic	W 81–62	3–1	Eblen Center (1,024); Cookeville, Tennessee
11/26/2014*; 7:00 pm	at Southeastern Louisiana; Green Wave Classic	L 65–86	3–2	University Center (550); Hammond, Louisiana
11/30/2014*; 1:00 pm	at Tulane; Green Wave Classic	L 68–73	3–3	Devlin Fieldhouse (912); New Orleans
12/03/2014*; 5:00 pm	Lipscomb	W 84–79	4–3	Eblen Center (1,150); Cookeville, Tennessee
12/07/2014*; 2:00 pm	Hiwassee	W 87–48	5–3	Eblen Center (742); Cookeville, Tennessee
12/13/2014*; 8:00 pm, SECN+	at Alabama	L 53–65	5–4	Coleman Coliseum (9,526); Tuscaloosa, Alabama
12/15/2014*; 6:00 pm	at North Florida	W 82–80	6–4	UNF Arena (1,128); Jacksonville, Florida
12/19/2014*; 6:00 pm, FSN	at Tennessee	L 58–61	6–5	Thompson–Boling Arena (13,201); Knoxville, Tennessee
12/22/2014*; 7:00 pm	at UMKC	W 81–60	7–5	Municipal Auditorium (1,359); Kansas City, Missouri
12/29/2014*; 6:00 pm	North Florida	W 87–84	8–5	Eblen Center (1,549); Cookeville, Tennessee
01/01/2015; 3:15 pm	at Eastern Illinois	L 59–61	8–6 (0–1)	Lantz Arena (805); Charleston, Illinois
01/03/2015; 6:30 pm, FCS Central	at SIU Edwardsville	L 62–85	8–7 (0–2)	Vadalabene Center (1,162); Edwardsville, Illinois
01/08/2015; 7:30 pm, WCTE	Murray State	L 67–83	8–8 (0–3)	Eblen Center (1,683); Cookeville, Tennessee
01/10/2015; 7:30 pm, WCTE	Austin Peay	W 72–56	9–8 (1–3)	Eblen Center (2,554); Cookeville, Tennessee
01/15/2015; 7:30 pm, WCTE	UT Martin	L 60–63	9–9 (1–4)	Eblen Center (1,856); Cookeville, Tennessee
01/17/2015; 6:00 pm	at Southeast Missouri State	L 61–65	9–10 (1–5)	Show Me Center (2,964); Cape Girardeau, Missouri
01/22/2015; 6:00 pm	Morehead State	L 74–78	9–11 (1–6)	Eblen Center (2,316); Cookeville, Tennessee
01/24/2015; 7:30 pm	Eastern Kentucky	W 83–81 ^{OT}	10–11 (2–6)	Eblen Center (2,519); Cookeville, Tennessee
01/29/2015; 7:00 pm	at Tennessee State	L 56–64	10–12 (2–7)	Gentry Complex (768); Nashville, Tennessee
01/31/2015; 2:00 pm	at Belmont	L 53–71	10–13 (2–8)	Curb Event Center (2,194); Nashville, Tennessee
02/07/2015; 7:30 pm	Jacksonville State	W 72–59	11–13 (3–8)	Eblen Center (2,068); Cookeville, Tennessee
02/12/2015; 7:00 pm, ASN	Tennessee State	W 71–52	12–13 (4–8)	Eblen Center (2,231); Cookeville, Tennessee
02/14/2015; 7:30 pm	at Jacksonville State	L 68–82	12–14 (4–9)	Pete Mathews Coliseum (1,011); Jacksonville, Alabama
02/16/2015*; 6:00 pm	at East Tennessee State	L 79–87	12–15	Freedom Hall Civic Center (2,072); Johnson City, Tennessee
02/21/2015; 7:30 pm, WCTE	Belmont	L 82–88	12–16 (4–10)	Eblen Center (1,614); Cookeville, Tennessee
02/26/2015; 8:00 pm, CBSSN	Morehead State	L 73–86	12–17 (4–11)	Ellis Johnson Arena (3,118); Morehead, Kentucky
02/28/2015; 6:00 pm	Eastern Kentucky	L 67–70	12–18 (4–12)	McBrayer Arena (3,700); Richmond, Kentucky
*Non-conference game. ^{#}Rankings from AP Poll. (#) Tournament seedings in parentheses. All times are in Central Time.
