= 2014–15 SIU Edwardsville Cougars men's basketball team =

American college basketball season

2014–15 SIU Edwardsville Cougars men's basketball
- Conference: Ohio Valley Conference
- West Division
- Record: 12–16 (8–8 OVC)
- Head coach: Lennox Forrester (8th season)
- Assistant coaches: Matt Laur; Deryl Cunningham; Ben Wierzba
- Home arena: Vadalabene Center

2014–15 Ohio Valley Conference men's basketball standings
	Conf.				Overall
Team	W		L	PCT	W		L	PCT
East
Belmont †	11	–	5	.688	22	–	11	.667
Eastern Kentucky	11	–	5	.688	21	–	12	.636
Morehead State	10	–	6	.625	17	–	17	.500
Jacksonville State	5	–	11	.313	12	–	19	.387
Tennessee Tech	4	–	12	.250	12	–	18	.400
Tennessee State	2	–	14	.125	5	–	26	.161
West
Murray State	16	–	0	1.000	29	–	6	.829
UT Martin	10	–	6	.625	21	–	13	.618
Eastern Illinois	9	–	7	.563	18	–	15	.545
SIU Edwardsville	8	–	8	.500	12	–	16	.429
Southeast Missouri St.	7	–	9	.438	13	–	17	.433
Austin Peay	3	–	13	.188	8	–	22	.267
† 2015 OVC tournament winner Rankings from AP poll

The 2014–15 SIU Edwardsville Cougars men's basketball team represented Southern Illinois University Edwardsville during the 2014–15 NCAA Division I men's basketball season. The Cougars, led by eighth year head coach Lennox Forrester, played their home games at the Vadalabene Center as members of the West Division of the Ohio Valley Conference. They finished the season 12–16, 8–8 in OVC play to finish in fourth place in the West Division. They lost in the first round of the OVC tournament to Eastern Illinois.

== Preseason ==
Seven players, all of whom saw major playing time, returned from the 11–20 team of 2013–14. They were joined by two junior college transfers and three freshmen. Two of the freshmen were recognized with honorable mentions as All-State players in Illinois and Indiana, and one of the junior college transfers was among the NJCAA statistical leaders in both rebounds and blocked shots.

After being one of only six Division I teams with no freshmen in 2013–14, this year's Cougars had three freshmen, four juniors, and five seniors. The other five schools with no freshmen last season--- UAB, Ohio, Portland State, Savannah State, and Valparaiso.

In putting the schedule together, coach Forrester attempted to get as many games as possible near the hometowns of his players, resulting in road games in Oregon, Michigan, and Indiana.

In the preseason poll of OVC coaches and sports information directors, SIUE was picked to finish third in the West Division. No Cougars were picked for the preseason All-OVC team.

For the third season in a row, the Cougars begin with a preseason exhibition game versus the Division III Greenville College Panthers. In place of a second exhibition game, the Cougars and the UMKC Kangaroos played a closed scrimmage at the VC.

== Season ==
Almost all home and Ohio Valley Conference games were streamed live on the OVC Digital Network. Other games were broadcast or cablecast and are included on the schedule, below, including nine games FOX Sports carried on its Midwest network.

The Cougars were dominant at the Vadalabene Center, building a home record of 11–3. Going on the road was another story, as they managed only one win in 13 away games. Overall, one result was a record of 8–8 in the OVC, earning the #7 seed in the conference tournament.

No Cougars were named to the OVC All-OVC or All-Newcomer teams.

== Postseason ==
Six days after the first round loss in the Ohio Valley Tournament, it was announced that head coach Lennox Forrester and his entire staff would not be retained.

== Roster ==
Source=

Pink background indicates players returning from 2013 to 2014.

#	Name	Position	Height	Weight	Year	Hometown	High school	Transfer from
0	Michael Chandler	Guard	6–8	205	Junior	Columbus, Georgia	Grovetown High School	Hill College (JC)
1	Kris Davis	Guard	6–2	190	Senior	Detroit, Michigan	Cass Technical High School	
2	Maurice Wiltz	Guard	6–2	190	Senior	Houston, Texas	Stafford High School	Colorado State
3	Keaton Jackson	Forward	6–10	220	Senior	Vancouver, Washington	Prairie High School	Missouri State-West Plains (JC)
4	C.J. Carr	Guard	5–7	145	Freshman	Rock Island, Illinois	Rock Island High School	
5	Grant Fiorentinos	Forward/Center	6–10	225	Junior	Cape Town, West Cape, South Africa	Hun School of Princeton (NJ)	Tulane
13	Jake Newton	Guard	6–6	200	Junior	Terre Haute, Indiana	Terre Haute North Vigo High School	Lincoln Trail College (JC)
23	Rozell Nunn	Guard/Forward	6–4	205	Senior	Kansas City, Kansas	F. L. Schlagle High School	Coffeyville Community College (JC)
24	Jalen Henry	Forward	6–8	220	Freshman	Springfield, Illinois	Springfield Southeast High School	
30	Michael Messer	Guard	6–6	215	Senior	Wildwood, Missouri	Lafayette High School	
32	Donivine Stewart	Guard	6–0	195	Junior	Peoria, Illinois	Bartonville Limestone Community High School	Bradley
45	Keenan Simmons	Guard	6–6	185	Freshman	Michigan City, Indiana	Michigan City High School	

== Schedule ==
Date time, TV	Opponent	Result	Record	High points	High rebounds	High assists	Site (attendance) city, state
Exhibition
11/06/2014*; 7:00 pm, OVC Digital Network	Greenville	W 90–52		— – —	— – —	— – —	Vadalabene Center (1,307); Edwardsville, Illinois
Regular season
11/14/2014*; 7:00 pm, OVC Digital Network	Harris–Stowe	W 104–56	1–0	20 – Stewart	8 – Stewart	10 – Stewart	Vadalabene Center (1,255); Edwardsville, Illinois
11/17/2014*; 7:00 pm, OVC Digital Network	IPFW	L 71–74	1–1	24 – Stewart	8 – Messer	5 – Stewart	Vadalabene Center (1,216); Edwardsville, Illinois
11/22/2014*; 9:00 pm, Stretch Internet	at Portland	L 53–75	1–2	13 – Jackson	6 – Jackson	5 – Carr	Chiles Center (1,828); Portland, Oregon
11/24/2014*; 9:00 pm, Big Sky Access	at Portland State	L 87–90 ^{OT}	1–3	25 – Davis	6 – Davis & Jackson	6 – Carr & Stewart	Stott Center (582); Portland, Oregon
12/03/2014*; 7:00 pm, FOX Sports Midwest; OVC Digital Network	Southern Illinois	L 67–79	1–4	18 – Davis	5 – Stewart	4 – Jackson	Vadalabene Center (3,508); Edwardsville, Illinois
12/06/2014*; 12 Noon	at Central Michigan	L 61–94	1–5	21 – Davis	5 – Jackson	5 – Stewart	McGuirk Arena (1,789); Mount Pleasant, Michigan
12/13/2014*; 6:00 pm, FOX Sports Midwest	at Saint Louis	L 61–67	1–6	18 – Davis	7 – Jackson	7 – Stewart	Chaifetz Arena (6,032); St. Louis, Missouri
12/17/2014*; 6:00 pm, Big South Sports Net	at Campbell	L 65–70	1–7	16 – Davis	5 – Stewart	6 – Stewart	Gore Arena (983); Buies Creek, North Carolina
12/20/2014*; 6:30 pm, FOX Sports Midwest; OVC Digital Network	Milwaukee	W 61–56	2–7	13 – Davis & Wiltz	6 – Wiltz	6 – Stewart	Vadalabene Center (918); Edwardsville, Illinois
12/22/2014*; 7:00 pm, FOX Sports Midwest; OVC Digital Network	Chicago State	W 63–38	3–7	16 – Davis	6 – Davis & Jackson	7 – Stewart	Vadalabene Center (641); Edwardsville, Illinois
12/28/2014*; 2:00 pm, OVC Digital Network	Robert Morris–Springfield	W 104–56	4–7	22 – Stewart	7 – Henry & Stewart	7 – Newton	Vadalabene Center (1,185); Edwardsville, Illinois
01/01/2015; 1:00 pm, OVC Digital Network	Jacksonville State	W 73–57	5–7 (1–0)	16 – Nunn	8 – Jackson	3 – Carr, Davis & Nunn	Vadalabene Center (1,674); Edwardsville, Illinois
01/03/2015; 6:30 pm, FOX Sports Midwest; OVC Digital Network	Tennessee Tech	W 85–62	6–7 (2–0)	18 – Nunn	9 – Jackson	7 – Stewart	Vadalabene Center (1,162); Edwardsville, Illinois
01/07/2015; 8:00 pm, CBS Sports Network	at Belmont	L 69–73	6–8 (2–1)	15 – Nunn	11 – Jackson	4 – Stewart	Curb Event Center (1,696); Nashville, Tennessee
01/10/2015; 6:30 pm, OVC Digital Network	Tennessee State	W 45–38	7–8 (3–1)	10 – Nunn	8 – Jackson	3 – Nunn	Vadalabene Center (1,702); Edwardsville, Illinois
01/15/2015; 6:30 pm, OVC Digital Network	at Morehead State	L 63–91	7–9 (3–2)	11 – Davis	6 – Messer	2 – Jackson, Stewart & Wiltz	Ellis Johnson Arena (2,021); Morehead, Kentucky
01/17/2015; 6:00 pm, OVC Digital Network	at Eastern Kentucky	L 62–78	7–10 (3–3)	15 – Davis	13 – Jackson	5 – Messer	Alumni Coliseum (2,800); Richmond, Kentucky
01/22/2015; 7:00 pm, FOX Sports Midwest; OVC Digital Network	Austin Peay	W 69–65	8–10 (4–3)	18 – Davis	7 – Jackson & Nunn	4 – Carr & Wiltz	Vadalabene Center (1,305); Edwardsville, Illinois
01/24/2015; 7:00 pm, FOX Sports Midwest; OVC Digital Network	Murray State	L 54–60	8–11 (4–4)	10 – Davis	6 – Nunn	3 – Nunn	Vadalabene Center (3,145); Edwardsville, Illinois
01/29/2015; 7:00 pm, OVC Digital Network	at Southeast Missouri State	W 75–61	9–11 (5–4)	23 – Davis	7 – Chandler & Nunn	2 – Stewart	Show Me Center (2,095); Cape Girardeau, Missouri
01/31/2015; 3:15 pm, OVC Digital Network	at Eastern Illinois	L 54–57	9–12 (5–5)	19 – Stewart	15 – Jackson	6 – Stewart	Lantz Arena (2,295); Charleston, Illinois
02/07/2015; 6:00 pm, OVC Digital Network	at UT Martin	L 59–64	9–13 (5–6)	18 – Davis	6 – Jackson & Nunn	2 – Carr, Davis, Firentinos & Nunn	Skyhawk Arena (2,417); Martin, Tennessee
02/12/2015; 7:00 pm, OVC Digital Network	at Murray State	L 46–78	9–14 (5–7)	14 – Nunn	6 – Nunn	2 – Carr, Nunn, Stewart & Wiltz	CFSB Center (5,914); Murray, Kentucky
02/14/2015; 7:00 pm, FOX Sports Midwest; OVC Digital Network	Eastern Illinois	W 80–63	10–14 (6–7)	23 – Messer	7 – Davis & Jackson	9 – Stewart	Vadalabene Center (1,434); Edwardsville, Illinois
02/19/2015; 7:00 pm, FOX Sports Midwest; OVC Digital Network	Southeast Missouri State	W 75–72	11–14 (7–7)	15 – Davis	5 – Jackson & Stewart	4 – Stewart	Vadalabene Center (1,221); Edwardsaville, Il
02/21/2015; 7:00 pm, OVC Digital Network	UT Martin	W 76–68	12–14 (8–7)	21 – Carr	8 – Stewart	7 – Stewart	Vadalabene Center (1,810); Edwardsville, Illinois
02/26/2015; 7:00 pm, American Sports Network; OVC Digital Network	at Austin Peay	L 61–64	12–15 (8–8)	18 – Davis	8 – Jackson	5 – Carr	Dunn Center (1,375); Clarksville, Tennessee
Ohio Valley Conference tournament
03/04/2015; 8:00 pm, OVC Digital Network	vs. Eastern Illinois; First round	L 66–78	12–16	15 – Carr	5 – Davis	3 – Stewart	Nashville Municipal Auditorium (723); Nashville, Tennessee
*Non-conference game. ^{#}Rankings from AP Poll. (#) Tournament seedings in parentheses. All times are in Central Time.
