= 2014–15 Morehead State Eagles men's basketball team =

American college basketball season

2014–15 Morehead State Eagles men's basketball
- Conference: Ohio Valley Conference
- East Division
- Record: 17–17 (10–6 OVC)
- Head coach: Sean Woods (3rd season)
- Assistant coaches: Dylan Howard; Brian "B.J." Ellis; Preston Spradlin
- Home arena: Ellis Johnson Arena

2014–15 Ohio Valley Conference men's basketball standings
	Conf.				Overall
Team	W		L	PCT	W		L	PCT
East
Belmont †	11	–	5	.688	22	–	11	.667
Eastern Kentucky	11	–	5	.688	21	–	12	.636
Morehead State	10	–	6	.625	17	–	17	.500
Jacksonville State	5	–	11	.313	12	–	19	.387
Tennessee Tech	4	–	12	.250	12	–	18	.400
Tennessee State	2	–	14	.125	5	–	26	.161
West
Murray State	16	–	0	1.000	29	–	6	.829
UT Martin	10	–	6	.625	21	–	13	.618
Eastern Illinois	9	–	7	.563	18	–	15	.545
SIU Edwardsville	8	–	8	.500	12	–	16	.429
Southeast Missouri St.	7	–	9	.438	13	–	17	.433
Austin Peay	3	–	13	.188	8	–	22	.267
† 2015 OVC tournament winner Rankings from AP poll

The 2014–15 Morehead State Eagles men's basketball team represented Morehead State University during the 2014–15 NCAA Division I men's basketball season. The Eagles, led by third-year head coach Sean Woods, played their home games at Ellis Johnson Arena and were members of the East Division of the Ohio Valley Conference. They finished the season 17–17, 10–6 in OVC play to finish in third place in the East Division. They advanced to the semifinals of the OVC tournament, where they lost to Murray State.

== Roster ==
Number	Name	Position	Height	Weight	Year	Hometown
1	Chad Donley	Guard	6–2	175	RS senior	Baker, Florida
2	Jordan Percell	Forward	6–7	220	Senior	Campbellsville, Kentucky
3	Corban Collins	Guard	6–3	185	RS sophomore	High Point, North Carolina
4	Will Henderson	Guard	5–10	150	Freshman	Nicholasville, Kentucky
5	Miquel Dicent	Guard	6–3	165	Freshman	Santo Domingo, Dominican Republic
10	Anthony Elechi	Forward/center	6–8	245	Junior	Elmont, New York
11	Marcus Fuggins	Forward/center	6–9	250	Junior	Perris, California
12	Bakari Turner	Guard	6–4	185	RS senior	Plano, Texas
14	Jared Ravenscraft	Guard	6–2	205	RS junior	Morehead, Kentucky
15	Kareem Storey	Guard	5–10	190	Senior	Baltimore, Maryland
21	Jalen Courtney	Forward	6–7	220	RS senior	Jackson, Mississippi
22	Angelo Warner	Guard	6–2	195	Senior	Orlando, Florida
24	Marquel Willis	Guard/forward	6–5	185	Freshman	Orlando, Florida
25	Karam Mashour	Forward	6–6	210	RS senior	Nazareth, Israel
31	Lyonell Gaines	Forward	6–6	220	RS junior	Louisville, Kentucky
32	Brent Arrington	Guard	6–3	180	RS junior	Halethorpe, Maryland
50	Billy Reader	Center	6–10	260	RS senior	Lake Oswego, Oregon
	Luka Pajkovic	Guard	6–3	200	Senior	Belgrade, Serbia

== Schedule ==
Date time, TV	Opponent	Result	Record	Site (attendance) city, state
Exhibition
11/05/2014*; 7:00 pm	St. Catharine	W 80–61		Ellis Johnson Arena (2,087); Morehead, Kentucky
Regular season
11/14/2014*; 10:30 pm	at UNLV; Coaches vs. Cancer Classic	L 59–60	0–1	Thomas & Mack Center (12,582); Paradise, Nevada
11/17/2014*; 7:00 pm	Cincinnati Christian	W 87–79	1–1	Ellis Johnson Arena (3,025); Morehead, Kentucky
11/19/2014*; 7:00 pm, FS Ohio	at Cincinnati	L 61–69	1–2	Fifth Third Arena (6,119); Cincinnati
11/21/2014*; 8:00 pm, ASN	at Louisiana Tech; Coaches vs. Cancer Classic	L 64–73	1–3	Thomas Assembly Center (2,937); Ruston, Louisiana
11/22/2014*; 9:30 pm	vs. Presbyterian; Coaches vs. Cancer Classic	W 69–49	2–3	Thomas Assembly Center (2,868); Ruston, Louisiana
11/23/2014*; 1:30 pm	vs. American; Coaches vs. Cancer Classic	L 46–51	2–4	Thomas Assembly Center (2,854); Ruston, Louisiana
11/26/2014*; 8:00 pm, ASN	at Marshall	W 77–68	3–4	Cam Henderson Center (5,077); Huntington, West Virginia
11/29/2014*; 2:00 pm	Kentucky Christian	W 121–49	4–4	Ellis Johnson Arena (1,535); Morehead, Kentucky
12/01/2014*; 7:00 pm	East Tennessee State	L 59–63	4–5	Ellis Johnson Arena (2,132); Morehead, Kentucky
12/04/2014*; 8:00 pm, ASN	at UAB	L 48–58	4–6	Bartow Arena (3,029); Birmingham, Alabama
12/06/2014*; 2:00 pm	Oakland	L 68–70 ^{OT}	4–7	Ellis Johnson Arena (2,087); Morehead, Kentucky
12/13/2014*; 1:00 pm, BTN	at No. 12 Ohio State	L 71–87	4–8	Value City Arena (14,578); Columbus, Ohio
12/17/2014*; 8:00 pm, ASN	at Green Bay	L 50–66	4–9	Resch Center (2,443); Ashwaubenon, Wisconsin
12/19/2014*; 7:00 pm	Northern Kentucky	L 60–83	4–10	Ellis Johnson Arena (1,435); Morehead, Kentucky
12/29/2014*; 8:00 pm	at Central Arkansas	W 95–60	5–10	Farris Center (310); Conway, Arkansas
01/03/2015; 7:30 pm	Murray State	L 57–66	5–11 (0–1)	Ellis Johnson Arena (4,247); Morehead, Kentucky
01/08/2015; 8:30 pm	at Southeast Missouri State	W 70–57	6–11 (1–1)	Show Me Center (1,724); Cape Girardeau, Missouri
01/10/2015; 7:00 pm	at UT Martin	L 72–75 ^{OT}	6–12 (1–2)	Skyhawk Arena (2,132); Martin, Tennessee
01/15/2015; 7:30 pm	SIU Edwardsville	W 91–63	7–12 (2–2)	Ellis Johnson Arena (2,021); Morehead, Kentucky
01/17/2015; 2:00 pm	Eastern Illinois	L 62–65	7–13 (2–3)	Ellis Johnson Arena (2,207); Morehead, Kentucky
01/22/2015; 7:00 pm	at Tennessee Tech	W 78–74	8–13 (3–3)	Eblen Center (2,316); Cookeville, Tennessee
01/24/2015; 5:30 pm	at Jacksonville State	W 66–63	9–13 (4–3)	Pete Mathews Coliseum (3,101); Jacksonville, Alabama
01/28/2015; 8:00 pm	at Austin Peay	W 82–69	10–13 (5–3)	Dunn Center (2,265); Clarksville, Tennessee
01/31/2015; 4:15 pm, CW Lexington	Eastern Kentucky	L 57–66	10–14 (5–4)	Ellis Johnson Arena (5,785); Morehead, Kentucky
02/05/2015; 7:00 pm	Tennessee State	W 72–57	11–14 (6–4)	Ellis Johnson Arena (2,489); Morehead, Kentucky
02/07/2015; 7:30 pm	Belmont	W 73–71	12–14 (7–4)	Ellis Johnson Arena (4,489); Morehead, Kentucky
02/11/2015; 9:00 pm, ESPNU	at Eastern Kentucky	L 57–69	12–15 (7–5)	McBrayer Arena (5,200); Richmond, Kentucky
02/14/2015; 7:00 pm	at Belmont	L 57–58	12–16 (7–6)	Curb Event Center (2,046); Nashville, Tennessee
02/19/2015; 8:00 pm	at Tennessee State; Postponed from 2/19/15	W 86–70	13–16 (8–6)	Gentry Complex (783); Nashville, Tennessee
02/26/2015; 9:00 pm, CBSSN	Tennessee Tech	W 86–73	14–16 (9–6)	Ellis Johnson Arena (3,118); Morehead, Kentucky
02/28/2015; 2:30 pm	Jacksonville State	W 87–55	15–16 (10–6)	Ellis Johnson Arena (2,310); Morehead, Kentucky
Ohio Valley tournament
03/04/2015; 7:00 pm	vs. Southeast Missouri State; First round	W 79–74	16–16	Nashville Municipal Auditorium (723); Nashville, Tennessee
03/05/2015; 7:00 pm	vs. UT Martin; Quarterfinals	W 76–65	17–16	Nashville Municipal Auditorium (839); Nashville, Tennessee
03/06/2015; 7:30 pm, ESPNU	vs. No. 25 Murray State; Semifinals	L 77–80	17–17	Nashville Municipal Auditorium (N/A); Nashville, Tennessee
*Non-conference game. ^{#}Rankings from AP Poll. (#) Tournament seedings in parentheses. All times are in Eastern Time.
