= 2014–15 Eastern Kentucky Colonels basketball team =

American college basketball season

2014–15 Eastern Kentucky Colonels men's basketball
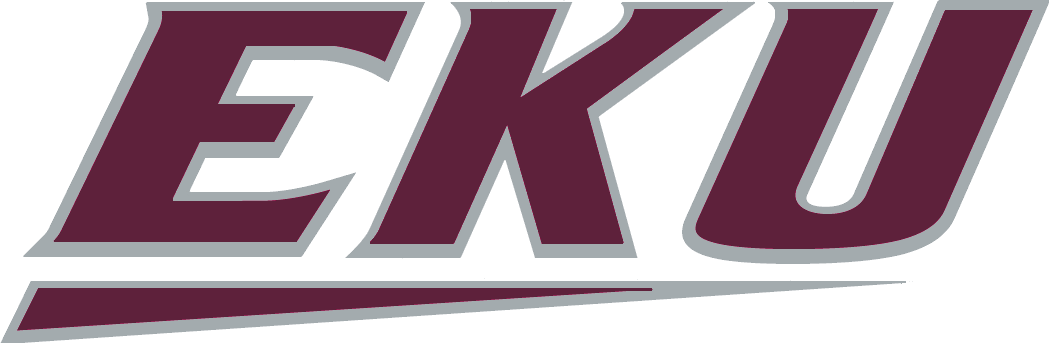

OVC East Division co–champions

CIT, Quarterfinals
- Conference: Ohio Valley Conference
- East Division
- Record: 21–12 (11–5 OVC)
- Head coach: Jeff Neubauer (10th season)
- Assistant coaches: Rodney Crawford; Austin Newton; Luke Strege
- Home arena: McBrayer Arena

2014–15 Ohio Valley Conference men's basketball standings
	Conf.				Overall
Team	W		L	PCT	W		L	PCT
East
Belmont †	11	–	5	.688	22	–	11	.667
Eastern Kentucky	11	–	5	.688	21	–	12	.636
Morehead State	10	–	6	.625	17	–	17	.500
Jacksonville State	5	–	11	.313	12	–	19	.387
Tennessee Tech	4	–	12	.250	12	–	18	.400
Tennessee State	2	–	14	.125	5	–	26	.161
West
Murray State	16	–	0	1.000	29	–	6	.829
UT Martin	10	–	6	.625	21	–	13	.618
Eastern Illinois	9	–	7	.563	18	–	15	.545
SIU Edwardsville	8	–	8	.500	12	–	16	.429
Southeast Missouri St.	7	–	9	.438	13	–	17	.433
Austin Peay	3	–	13	.188	8	–	22	.267
† 2015 OVC tournament winner Rankings from AP poll

The 2014–15 Eastern Kentucky Colonels basketball team represented Eastern Kentucky University during the 2014–15 NCAA Division I men's basketball season. The Colonels, led by tenth year head coach Jeff Neubauer, played their home games at McBrayer Arena within Alumni Coliseum and were members of the East Division of the Ohio Valley Conference. They finished the season 21–12, 11–5 OVC play to finish in a share for East Division championship. They lost in the semifinals of the OVC tournament to Belmont. They were invited to the CollegeInsider.com Tournament where they defeated Norfolk State in the first round and High Point in the second round before losing in the quarterfinals to fellow OVC member UT Martin.

On March 30, head coach Jeff Neubauer resigned to become the head coach at Fordham. He finished at EKU with a 10-year record of 188–134.

== Roster ==
Number	Name	Position	Height	Weight	Year	Hometown
0	Paul Jackson	Guard	6–1	178	Freshman	Lithonia, Georgia
1	Robbie Stenzel	Guard	6–5	195	Senior	Winchester, Kentucky
2	Corey Walden	Guard	6–2	189	Senior	Daytona Beach, Florida
3	Denzel Richardson	Guard	6–5	200	Junior	Baltimore, Maryland
4	Tommy Matthews	Guard	6–1	180	Junior	Clinton, Maryland
5	Isaac McGlone	Guard	6–2	175	Sophomore	Lancaster, Ohio
11	Jaylen Babb-Harrison	Guard	6–2	187	RS–Sophomore	Ajax, Ontario
13	Daniel Norl	Guard	6–2	185	Freshman	Clarksville, Tennessee
14	Daniel Parke	Guard	6–1	165	Sophomore	Richmond, Kentucky
21	JaVontae Hawkins	Guard	6–5	211	Junior	Flint, Michigan
22	Timmy Knipp	Guard	6–7	205	Senior	Olive Hill, Kentucky
23	Jonathan Hood	Guard	6–4	206	Junior	Durham, North Carolina
24	K.J. Bluford	Guard	6–1	185	Junior	Minneapolis
32	Ja'Mill Powell	Guard	6–7	180	Junior	Bridgeport, Connecticut
33	Deverin Muff	Forward	6–8	212	Senior	Strongsville, Ohio
42	Eric Stutz	Forward	6–8	225	Senior	Newburgh, Indiana

== Schedule ==
Date time, TV	Opponent	Result	Record	Site (attendance) city, state
Australia summer trip
08/08/2014*; 5:00 am	at Sydney Kings	L 65–76		Sutherland Basketball Association (500); Sydney, AUS
08/10/2014*; 2:00 am	at Wollongong Hawks	L 99–106 ^{OT}		Snakepit (300); Wollongong, AUS
08/11/2014*; 6:30 am	at Suncoast Clippers	W 125–91		Maroochy Basketball Stadium; Brisbane, AUS
08/14/2014*; 5:00 am	at Cairns Taipans	L 75–77		Bendigo Bank Basketball Stadium; Cairns, AUS
Exhibition
11/07/2014*; 7:00 pm	Urbana	W 96–81		McBrayer Arena (1,400); Richmond, Kentucky
Regular season
11/14/2014*; 7:00 pm	Savannah State	W 76–53	1–0	McBrayer Arena (3,950); Richmond, Kentucky
11/18/2014*; 7:00 pm	Kentucky Christian	W 115–35	2–0	McBrayer Arena (1,900); Richmond, Kentucky
11/22/2014*; 7:00 pm	Cincinnati–Clermont	W 115–50	3–0	McBrayer Arena (1,400); Richmond, Kentucky
11/26/2014*; 9:00 pm	at Southern Utah	W 73–64	4–0	Centrum Arena (N/A); Cedar City, Utah
11/29/2014*; 9:00 pm	at BYU	L 76–90	4–1	Marriott Center (16,770); Provo, Utah
12/03/2014*; 7:00 pm	Valparaiso	L 66–72	4–2	McBrayer Arena (2,600); Richmond, Kentucky
12/07/2014*; 6:00 pm, SECN	at No. 1 Kentucky	L 49–82	4–3	Rupp Arena (23,268); Lexington, Kentucky
12/13/2014*; 6:00 pm	at IUPUI	W 73–64	5–3	Indiana Farmers Coliseum (1,096); Indianapolis
12/16/2014*; 7:00 pm	East Tennessee State	L 60–63	5–4	McBrayer Arena (1,300); Richmond, Kentucky
12/19/2014*; 7:00 pm	at No. 18 Miami (FL)	W 72–44	6–4	BankUnited Center (4,467); Coral Gables, Florida
12/22/2014*; 7:00 pm	at Florida Atlantic	L 66–69	6–5	FAU Arena (805); Boca Raton, Florida
12/30/2014*; 1:00 pm	at Coppin State	W 66–63	7–5	Physical Education Complex (638); Baltimore
01/03/2015*; 7:00 pm	South Carolina State	W 63–52	8–5	McBrayer Arena (2,300); Richmond, Kentucky
01/08/2015; 8:30 pm	at UT Martin	W 66–58	9–5 (1–0)	Skyhawk Arena (3,108); Martin, Tennessee
01/10/2015; 7:00 pm	at Southeast Missouri State	W 68–55	10–5 (2–0)	Show Me Center (1,924); Cape Girardeau, Missouri
01/15/2015; 7:30 pm	Eastern Illinois	L 65–72	10–6 (2–1)	McBrayer Arena (2,400); Richmond, Kentucky
01/17/2015; 7:00 pm	SIU Edwardsville	W 78–62	11–6 (3–1)	McBrayer Arena (2,800); Richmond, Kentucky
01/22/2015; 8:00 pm	at Jacksonville State	L 67–71	11–7 (3–2)	Pete Mathews Coliseum (1,801); Jacksonville, Alabama
01/24/2015; 8:30 pm	at Tennessee Tech	L 81–83 ^{OT}	11–8 (3–3)	Eblen Center (2,519); Cookeville, Tennessee
01/29/2015; 9:00 pm, ESPNU	at Murray State	L 78–85 ^{OT}	11–9 (3–4)	CFSB Center (N/A); Murray, Kentucky
01/31/2015; 4:15 pm	at Morehead State	W 66–57	12–9 (4–4)	Ellis Johnson Arena (5,785); Morehead, Kentucky
02/05/2015; 9:00 pm, ESPNU	Belmont	W 81–69	13–9 (5–4)	McBrayer Arena (4,700); Richmond, Kentucky
02/07/2015; 7:00 pm	Tennessee State	W 77–72	14–9 (6–4)	McBrayer Arena (2,300); Richmond, Kentucky
02/11/2015; 9:00 pm, ESPNU	Morehead State	W 69–57	15–9 (7–4)	McBrayer Arena (5,200); Richmond, Kentucky
02/14/2015; 8:30 pm	at Tennessee State	W 69–41	16–9 (8–4)	Gentry Complex (2,578); Nashville, Tennessee
02/17/2015; 7:00 pm	Austin Peay			McBrayer Arena; Richmond, Kentucky
02/19/2015; 8:00 pm	at Belmont	L 61–66	16–10 (8–5)	Curb Event Center (1,904); Nashville, Tennessee
02/22/2015; 7:00 pm	Austin Peay	W 76–64	17–10 (9–5)	McBrayer Arena (1,300); Richmond, Kentucky
02/26/2015; 7:00 pm	Jacksonville State	W 63–57	18–10 (10–5)	McBrayer Arena (2,600); Richmond, Kentucky
02/28/2015; 7:00 pm	Tennessee Tech	W 70–67	19–10 (11–5)	McBrayer Arena (3,700); Richmond, Kentucky
Ohio Valley tournament
03/06/2015; 8:30 pm, ESPNU	vs. Belmont; Semifinals	L 52–53	19–11	Nashville Municipal Auditorium (3,753); Nashville, Tennessee
CIT
03/17/2015*; 7:00 pm	Norfolk State; First round	W 81–75	20–11	McBrayer Arena (2,950); Richmond, Kentucky
03/20/2015*; 7:00 pm	High Point; Second round	W 66–65	21–11	McBrayer Arena (2,300); Richmond, Kentucky
03/25/2015*; 7:00 pm	UT Martin; Quarterfinals	L 69–70	21–12	McBrayer Arena (3,300); Richmond, Kentucky
*Non-conference game. ^{#}Rankings from AP Poll. (#) Tournament seedings in parentheses. All times are in Eastern Time.
