= 2014–15 Tennessee Volunteers basketball team =

American college basketball season

2014–15 Tennessee Volunteers men's basketball
- Conference: Southeastern Conference
- Record: 16–16 (7–11 SEC)
- Head coach: Donnie Tyndall (1st season)
- Assistant coaches: Al Pinkins; Chris Shumate; Beau Braden
- Home arena: Thompson–Boling Arena

2014–15 Southeastern Conference men's basketball standings
	Conf.				Overall
Team	W		L	PCT	W		L	PCT
No. 1 Kentucky †	18	–	0	1.000	38	–	1	.974
No. 21 Arkansas	13	–	5	.722	27	–	9	.750
LSU	11	–	7	.611	22	–	11	.667
Georgia	11	–	7	.611	21	–	12	.636
Texas A&M	11	–	7	.611	21	–	12	.636
Ole Miss	11	–	7	.611	21	–	13	.618
Vanderbilt	9	–	9	.500	21	–	14	.600
Alabama	8	–	10	.444	19	–	15	.559
Florida	8	–	10	.444	16	–	17	.485
Tennessee	7	–	11	.389	16	–	16	.500
South Carolina	6	–	12	.333	17	–	16	.515
Mississippi State	6	–	12	.333	13	–	19	.406
Auburn	4	–	14	.222	15	–	20	.429
Missouri	3	–	15	.167	9	–	23	.281
† 2015 SEC tournament winner Rankings from AP poll

The 2014–15 Tennessee Volunteers basketball team represented the University of Tennessee in the 2014–15 NCAA Division I men's basketball season. The team's head coach was Donnie Tyndall, who was in his first season at Tennessee. The team played their home games at the Thompson–Boling Arena in Knoxville, Tennessee as a member of the Southeastern Conference. They finished the season 16–16, 7–11 in SEC play to finish in tenth place. They advanced to the quarterfinals of the SEC tournament where they lost to Arkansas.

On March 27, head coach Donnie Tyndall, due to an investigation of violations committed when he was the head coach at Southern Miss, was fired after only one season.

== Previous season ==
The Vols posted a record of 24–13 (11–7 SEC) in the 2012–13 season and finished in 4th place. They advance to the semifinals which they lost to Florida in the 2014 SEC men's basketball tournament. They received at-large bid to the 2014 NCAA Men's Division I Basketball Tournament which they lost to Michigan in the sweet 16.

== Departures ==
Name	Number	Pos.	Height	Weight	Year	Hometown	Notes
Antonio Barton	2	G	6'1"	172	Senior	Baltimore	Graduated
Jarnell Stokes	5	F	6'8"	250	Junior	Memphis, Tennessee	Enter 2014 NBA draft
Rawane Ndiaye	10	C	6'10"	280	Junior	Raleigh, North Carolina	Injured
Darius Thompson	15	G	6'5"	181	Freshman	Murfreesboro, Tennessee	Transferred to Virginia
A. J. Davis	21	F	6'9"	208	RS Freshman	Buford, Georgia	Transferred to Central Florida
Quinton Chievous	31	G	6'6"	214	RS Sophomore	Chicago	Transferred to Hampton
D'Montre Edwards	32	G	6'6"	203	Senior	Charleston, South Carolina	Graduated
Jeronne Maymon	34	F	6'8"	260	RS Senior	Madison, Wisconsin	Graduated
Jordan McRae	52	G	6'6"	185	Senior	Midway, Georgia	Graduated/2014 NBA draft
Dominic Woodson	55	F	6'10"	270	Sophomore	Dallas	Transferred at the end of fall semester

=== Incoming transfers ===
Name	Number	Pos.	Height	Weight	Year	Hometown	Previous School
Ian Chiles	5	G	6'1"	188	Senior	Louisville, Kentucky	Transferred from IUPUI. Will be eligible to play immediately since Chiles graduated from IUPUI.
Braxton Bonds	32	G	6'1"	170	Freshman	Nashville, Tennessee	Walk-on transfer from Liberty University.

== Recruiting ==
College recruiting information (2014)
Name	Hometown	School	Height	Weight	Commit date
Detrick Mostella; SG	Decatur, Alabama	Notre Dame Prep	6 ft 3 in (1.91 m)	170 lb (77 kg)	May 7, 2014
Detrick Mostella; SG	Recruit ratings: Scout: Rivals: 247Sports: ESPN:				
Kevin Punter; SG	Bronx, New York	State Fair C.C.	6 ft 4 in (1.93 m)	170 lb (77 kg)	May 5, 2014
Kevin Punter; SG	Recruit ratings: Scout: Rivals: 247Sports: ESPN:				
Tariq Owens; PF	Baltimore, Maryland	Mount Zion Baptist Christian School	6 ft 9 in (2.06 m)	190 lb (86 kg)	May 21, 2014
Tariq Owens; PF	Recruit ratings: Scout: Rivals: 247Sports: ESPN:				
Willie Carmichael; PF	Apopka, Florida	Wekiva High School	6 ft 7 in (2.01 m)	195 lb (88 kg)	May 13, 2014
Willie Carmichael; PF	Recruit ratings: Scout: Rivals: 247Sports: ESPN:				
Jabari McGhee; SF	Albany, Georgia	Hargrave Military Academy	6 ft 7 in (2.01 m)	190 lb (86 kg)	May 2, 2014
Jabari McGhee; SF	Recruit ratings: Scout: Rivals: 247Sports: ESPN:				
Devon Baulkman; SG	Bainbridge, Georgia	Gulf Coast C.C.	6 ft 5 in (1.96 m)	205 lb (93 kg)	May 13, 2014
Devon Baulkman; SG	Recruit ratings: Scout: Rivals: ESPN:				
Overall recruit ranking: Scout: NR Rivals: NR ESPN: NR
Note: In many cases, Scout, Rivals, 247Sports, On3, and ESPN may conflict in their listings of height and weight.; In these cases, the average was taken. ESPN grades are on a 100-point scale.; Sources: "2014 Team Ranking". Rivals.

== Roster ==
2014–15 Tennessee Volunteers men's basketball team
Players
Coaches

Pos.	#	Name	Height	Weight	Year	Hometown
G	0	Kevin Punter	6 ft 4 in (1.93 m)	180 lb (82 kg)	Jr	Bronx, New York
G	1	Josh Richardson	6 ft 6 in (1.98 m)	200 lb (91 kg)	Sr	Edmond, Oklahoma
G	3	Robert Hubbs III	6 ft 6 in (1.98 m)	206 lb (93 kg)	So	Newbern, Tennessee
G	4	Armani Moore	6 ft 5 in (1.96 m)	215 lb (98 kg)	Jr	Kennesaw, Georgia
G	5	Ian Chiles (injured)	6 ft 1 in (1.85 m)	200 lb (91 kg)	RS Sr	Louisville, Kentucky
F	11	Tariq Owens	6 ft 10 in (2.08 m)	205 lb (93 kg)	Fr	Odenton, Maryland
G	15	Detrick Mostella	6 ft 3 in (1.91 m)	170 lb (77 kg)	Fr	Decatur, Alabama
F	21	Jabari McGhee (injured)	6 ft 8 in (2.03 m)	210 lb (95 kg)	Fr	Albany, Georgia
G	23	Derek Reese	6 ft 8 in (2.03 m)	220 lb (100 kg)	Jr	Orlando, Florida
F	24	Willie Carmichael III	6 ft 8 in (2.03 m)	210 lb (95 kg)	Fr	Apopka, Florida
G	25	Galen Campbell	6 ft 2 in (1.88 m)	190 lb (86 kg)	RS Jr	Knoxville, Tennessee
G	32	Braxton Bonds (W) (I)	6 ft 1 in (1.85 m)	170 lb (77 kg)	Fr	Nashville, Tennessee
G	33	Brandon Lopez (W) (injured)	6 ft 1 in (1.85 m)	180 lb (82 kg)	Sr	Knoxville, Tennessee
G	34	Devon Baulkman	6 ft 5 in (1.96 m)	200 lb (91 kg)	Jr	Bainbridge, Georgia

Head coach

- Donnie Tyndall (Morehead State)

Assistant coach(es)

- Al Pinkins (NC State)
- Chris Shumate (Murray State)
- Beau Braden (Centre College)

Legend

- (C) Team captain
- (S) Suspended
- (I) Ineligible
- (W) Walk-on
- Injured
- Current redshirt

Roster

== Schedule and results ==
Date time, TV	Opponent	Result	Record	High points	High rebounds	High assists	Site (attendance) city, state
Exhibition
11/03/2014*; 7:00 pm, SECN+	Pikeville	W 80–62		17 – Moore	7 – Moore, Reese	5 – Richardson	Thompson–Boling Arena (13,135); Knoxville, Tennessee
11/08/2014*; 7:00 pm, SECN+	Lenoir–Rhyne	W 77–49		14 – Reese, Richardson	7 – Hubbs III, Moore	3 – Moore	Thompson–Boling Arena (13,838); Knoxville, Tennessee
Non-conference regular season
11/14/2014*; 6:30 pm, CBSSN	vs. No. 15 VCU; Veterans Classic	L 69–85	0–1	17 – Richardson	5 – McGhee	7 – Punter	Alumni Hall (5,699); Annapolis, Maryland
11/20/2014*; 7:00 pm, FSN	Texas Southern	W 70–58	1–1	19 – Richardson	8 – Richardson, Moore	2 – Richardson, Punter	Thompson–Boling Arena (13,236); Knoxville, Tennessee
11/27/2014*; 12:00 pm, ESPN2	vs. Santa Clara; Orlando Classic Quarterfinals	W 64–57	2–1	18 – Richardson, Moore	9 – McGhee	3 – Moore	HP Field House (3,915); Lake Buena Vista, Florida
11/28/2014*; 12:00 pm, ESPN	vs. No. 11 Kansas; Orlando Classic Semifinals	L 67–82	2–2	16 – Richardson	5 – Richardson	2 – Richardson, Punter, Hubbs III	HP Field House (4,383); Lake Buena Vista, Florida
11/30/2014*; 4:00 pm, ESPN2	vs. Marquette; Orlando Classic 3rd Place Game	L 59–67	2–3	18 – Moore	13 – Moore	4 – Baulkman	HP Field House (4,847); Lake Buena Vista, Florida
12/06/2014*; 3:15 pm, ESPN2	Kansas State; Big 12/SEC Challenge	W 65–64	3–3	17 – Richardson	6 – Carmichael	5 – Moore	Thompson–Boling Arena (14,111); Knoxville, Tennessee
12/14/2014*; 2:00 pm, ESPNU	No. 15 Butler	W 67–55	4–3	20 – Richardson	8 – Moore	3 – Richardson	Thompson–Boling Arena (14,058); Knoxville, Tennessee
12/17/2014*; 7:00 pm, ESPN2	at NC State	L 72–83	4–4	17 – Richardson	5 – Moore	5 – Richardson	PNC Arena (15,281); Raleigh, North Carolina
12/19/2014*; 7:00 pm, FSN	Tennessee Tech	W 61–58	5–4	19 – Richardson	5 – Moore	3 – Moore, Richardson	Thompson–Boling Arena (13,201); Knoxville, Tennessee
12/22/2014*; 7:00 pm, SECN	Mercer	W 64–54	6–4	22 – Baulkman	7 – Reese	6 – Richardson	Thompson–Boling Arena (13,093); Knoxville, Tennessee
12/27/2014*; 8:30 pm, SECN	Tennessee State	W 67–46	7–4	18 – Punter	11 – Moore	8 – Richardson	Thompson–Boling Arena (13,459); Knoxville, Tennessee
12/31/2014*; 1:00 pm, SECN	East Tennessee State	W 71–61	8–4	19 – Richardson	12 – Moore	7 – Moore	Thompson–Boling Arena (14,245); Knoxville, Tennessee
SEC regular season
01/07/2015; 9:00 pm, SECN	at Mississippi State	W 61–47	9–4 (1–0)	15 – Punter	10 – Reese	5 – Richardson	Humphrey Coliseum (5,704); Starkville, Mississippi
01/10/2015; 2:00 pm, SECN	Alabama	L 38–56	9–5 (1–1)	17 – Richardson	9 – Moore	3 – Punter	Thompson–Boling Arena (16,695); Knoxville, Tennessee
01/13/2015; 7:00 pm, ESPNU	No. 19 Arkansas	W 74–69	10–5 (2–1)	20 – Richardson	8 – Moore	4 – Richardson	Thompson–Boling Arena (13,366); Knoxville, Tennessee
01/17/2015; 6:00 pm, SECN	at Missouri	W 59–51	11–5 (3–1)	15 – Moore	11 – Moore	8 – Richardson	Mizzou Arena (10,359); Columbia, Missouri
01/20/2015; 9:00 pm, ESPNU	at South Carolina	W 66–62	12–5 (4–1)	13 – Richardson, Punter	9 – Reese	3 – Punter	Colonial Life Arena (12,032); Columbia, South Carolina
01/24/2015; 1:00 pm, FSN	Texas A&M	L 61–67	12–6 (4–2)	17 – Punter	6 – Reese	4 – Reese	Thompson–Boling Arena (16,547); Knoxville, Tennessee
01/27/2015; 9:00 pm, ESPNU	at Arkansas	L 64–69	12–7 (4–3)	17 – Richardson	6 – Moore, Reese	6 – Richardson	Bud Walton Arena (12,753); Fayetteville, Arkansas
01/31/2015; 12:00 pm, ESPN2	Auburn	W 71–63	13–7 (5–3)	19 – Moore	13 – Moore	6 – Richardson	Thompson–Boling Arena (18,439); Knoxville, Tennessee
02/03/2015; 7:00 pm, SECN	Mississippi State	L 66–71	13–8 (5–4)	30 – Richardson	10 – Moore	5 – Richardson	Thompson–Boling Arena (13,268); Knoxville, Tennessee
02/07/2015; 12:00 pm, ESPN2	at Georgia	L 53–56	13–9 (5–5)	15 – Hubbs	6 – Hubbs	4 – Richardson	Stegeman Coliseum (9,730); Athens, Georgia
02/11/2015; 9:00 pm, SECN	at Vanderbilt	W 76–73 ^{OT}	14–9 (6–5)	27 – Richardson	8 – Reese	4 – Richardson	Memorial Gymnasium (11,892); Nashville, Tennessee
02/14/2015; 4:00 pm, SECN	LSU	L 55–73	14–10 (6–6)	16 – Moore	8 – Moore	2 – Richardson, Punter, Moore	Thompson–Boling Arena (16,051); Knoxville, Tennessee
02/17/2015; 7:00 pm, ESPN	No. 1 Kentucky; Rivalry	L 48–66	14–11 (6–7)	14 – Punter	8 – Moore	2 – Reese	Thompson–Boling Arena (21,678); Knoxville, Tennessee
02/21/2015; 7:30 pm, ESPNU	at Ole Miss	L 57–59	14–12 (6–8)	15 – Moore	9 – Moore	5 – Moore	Tad Smith Coliseum (8,630); Oxford, Mississippi
02/26/2015; 7:00 pm, ESPN2	Vanderbilt	L 65–73	14–13 (6–9)	20 – Richardson	6 – Richardson, Moore	5 – Richardson	Thompson–Boling Arena (13,536); Knoxville, Tennessee
02/28/2015; 6:00 pm, ESPN2	at Florida	L 49–66	14–14 (6–10)	18 – Moore	5 – Moore	3 – Richardson, Punter	O'Connell Center (11,970); Gainesville, Florida
03/04/2015; 7:00 pm, SECN	at LSU	W 78–63	15–14 (7–10)	20 – Richardson	9 – Reese	4 – Moore	Maravich Center (8,736); Baton Rouge, Louisiana
03/07/2015; 4:00 pm, FSN	South Carolina	L 49–60	15–15 (7–11)	14 – Richardson, Hubbs	6 – Richardson, Moore	6 – Richardson	Thompson–Boling Arena (16,049); Knoxville, Tennessee
SEC Tournament
03/12/2015; 7:00 pm, SECN	vs. Vanderbilt; Second round	W 67–61	16–15	22 – Richardson	7 – Reese	4 – Punter	Bridgestone Arena (15,032); Nashville, Tennessee
03/13/2015; 7:00 pm, SECN	vs. No. 21 Arkansas; Quarterfinals	L 72–80	16–16	22 – Richardson	10 – Richardson	3 – Richardson	Bridgestone Arena (13,135); Nashville, Tennessee
*Non-conference game. ^{#}Rankings from AP Poll. (#) Tournament seedings in parentheses.

== See also ==
- 2014–15 Tennessee Lady Volunteers basketball team
