= Josh Robinson (basketball) =

American basketball player (born 1996)

Personal information
- Born: March 13, 1996 (age 30) St. Louis, Missouri, U.S.
- Listed height: 6 ft 2 in (1.88 m)
- Listed weight: 185 lb (84 kg)

Career information
- High school: St. Mary's (St. Louis, Missouri)
- College: Austin Peay (2014–2017)
- NBA draft: 2017: undrafted
- Position: Guard

Josh Robinson (born March 13, 1996) is an American professional basketball player.

== High school and college career ==
Robinson was a stand-out scorer for St. Mary's High School, averaging 35.8 points a game as a senior en route to Player of the Year and Offensive Player of the Year (by the Archdiocesan Athletic Association Large Division) honors.

Mostly coming off the bench, he averaged 9.9 points per contest in his freshman year (2014–15) at Austin Peay. He increased his scoring output as a sophomore, pouring in 16.9 points a game for the Governors, making 72 triples on the season, while pulling down 3.1 rebounds and handing out 2.6 assists per outing. As a junior, Robinson scored 20.3 points per game, having converted 71-of-194 from beyond the arc. He also averaged 3.5 assists and 3.0 rebounds per contest. In early March 2017, Robinson was arrested on drug charges and subsequently suspended indefinitely by Austin Peay for a violation of team rules.

Robinson opted to enter the 2017 NBA draft as an underclassman, but was not taken by any team.
