= 2014–15 Jacksonville Dolphins men's basketball team =

American college basketball season

2014–15 Jacksonville Dolphins men's basketball
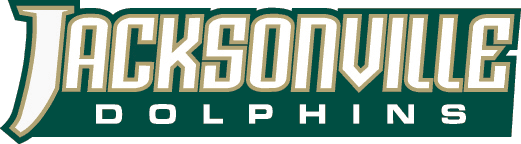
- Conference: Atlantic Sun Conference
- Record: 10–22 (4–10 A-Sun)
- Head coach: Tony Jasick (1st season)
- Assistant coaches: Dan Bere'; Scott Wagers; Azeez Ali
- Home arena: Veterans Memorial Arena; Swisher Gymnasium

2014–15 Atlantic Sun men's basketball standings
	Conf.				Overall
Team	W		L	PCT	W		L	PCT
North Florida †	12	–	2	.857	23	–	12	.657
Florida Gulf Coast	11	–	3	.786	22	–	11	.667
USC Upstate	8	–	6	.571	24	–	12	.667
Lipscomb	7	–	7	.500	14	–	17	.452
Northern Kentucky*	7	–	7	.500	13	–	17	.433
Jacksonville	4	–	10	.286	10	–	22	.313
Kennesaw State	4	–	10	.286	10	–	22	.313
Stetson	3	–	11	.214	9	–	22	.290
† 2015 Atlantic Sun Tournament winner *NKU was eligible for A-Sun Tourney, but not for postseason play due to Div. I transition

The 2014–15 Jacksonville Dolphins men's basketball team represented Jacksonville University during the 2014–15 NCAA Division I men's basketball season. The Dolphins were members of the Atlantic Sun Conference (A-Sun). They were led by first year head coach Tony Jasick and played their home games in both the Veterans Memorial Arena and Swisher Gymnasium. They finished the season 10–22, 4–10 in A-Sun play to finish in a tie for sixth place. They lost in the quarterfinals of the A-Sun tournament to Florida Gulf Coast.

== Roster ==
Number	Name	Position	Height	Weight	Year	Hometown
0	Marcellous Bell	Guard	5–11	170	Junior	Hyattsville, Maryland
1	Jeremy Bogus	Guard	6–5	190	Senior	Birmingham, Alabama
2	Shea Jones	Guard	6–1	175	Sophomore	Weston, Florida
3	B. J. Edwards	Guard	6–0	165	Freshman	Lehigh Acres, Florida
4	Jaspin Canteen	Guard	6–3	190	Junior	Virginia Beach, Virginia
5	Darius Dawkins	Forward	6–7	200	Junior	McLeansville, North Carolina
11	Omar El Manasterly	Forward	6–6	220	Sophomore	Sugar Land, Texas
13	Marcel White	Forward	6–6	220	Sophomore	Lake Wales, Florida
14	Josh Murray	Center	6–9	220	Sophomore	Burlington, North Carolina
15	J. R. Holder	Forward	6–7	180	Sophomore	Atlanta, Georgia
22	Andris Misters	Guard	6–5	200	Junior	Jelgava, Latvia
23	Cartee Pettis	Guard	6–2	180	Junior	Oviedo, Florida
25	Antwon Clayton	Forward	6–6	200	Freshman	Eustis, Florida
32	Josh Adeyeye	Guard/Forward	6–5	220	Junior	Fayetteville, North Carolina
34	Tim Gill	Forward/Center	6–7	240	Junior	Minneapolis, Minnesota
55	Kori Babineaux	Guard	6–4	205	Junior	Folsom, California

== Schedule ==
Date time, TV	Opponent	Result	Record	Site (attendance) city, state
Regular season
11/14/2014*; 8:00 pm	at Hofstra	L 61–94	0–1	Mack Sports Complex (2,208); Hempstead, NY
11/16/2014*; 2:00 pm	Florida National	W 72–61	1–1	Swisher Gymnasium (733); Jacksonville, FL
11/18/2014*; 7:00 pm	Jackson State	L 57–66	1–2	Veterans Memorial Arena (236); Jacksonville, FL
11/20/2014*; 7:00 pm	at NC State	L 43–79	1–3	PNC Arena (14,438); Raleigh, NC
11/24/2014*; 7:00 pm	at IPFW	L 71–89	1–4	Hilliard Gates Sports Center (1,808); Fort Wayne, IN
11/26/2014*; 7:00 pm	Trinity Baptist	W 69–57	2–4	Swisher Gymnasium (317); Jacksonville, FL
11/29/2014*; 2:00 pm, ESPN3	at South Florida	L 65–79	2–5	USF Sun Dome (2,993); Tampa, FL
12/01/2014*; 8:00 pm	at Samford	L 70–76 ^{OT}	2–6	Pete Hanna Center (613); Homewood, AL
12/04/2014*; 7:00 pm	Appalachian State	L 56–67	2–7	Veterans Memorial Arena (397); Jacksonville, FL
12/06/2014*; 4:00 pm	at Bethune-Cookman	L 47–52	2–8	Moore Gymnasium (905); Daytona Beach, FL
12/14/2014*; 4:00 pm, FSN	at Florida	L 34–79	2–9	O'Connell Center (10,123); Gainesville, FL
12/17/2014*; 7:00 pm	Gardner–Webb	W 68–65	3–9	Veterans Memorial Arena (467); Jacksonville, FL
12/20/2014*; 7:00 pm	Truett–McConnell	W 84–55	4–9	Veterans Memorial Arena (N/A); Jacksonville, FL
12/23/2014*; 8:00 pm	at Mississippi State	L 47–70	4–10	Humphrey Coliseum (5,366); Starkville, MS
12/27/2014*; 2:00 pm	Jacksonville State	W 75–61	5–10	Veterans Memorial Arena (670); Jacksonville, FL
12/30/2014*; 7:00 pm	Florida Atlantic	L 50–68	5–11	Veterans Memorial Arena (579); Jacksonville, FL
01/06/2015*; 7:00 pm	at Florida A&M	W 79–56	6–11	Teaching Gym (1,011); Tallahassee, FL
01/10/2015; 3:00 pm	North Florida	L 63–86	6–12 (0–1)	Veterans Memorial Arena (1,879); Jacksonville, FL
01/14/2015; 7:00 pm, ESPN3	Stetson	W 71–69	7–12 (1–1)	Swisher Gymnasium (897); Jacksonville, FL
01/17/2015; 7:00 pm, ESPN3	at Florida Gulf Coast	L 50–79	7–13 (1–2)	Alico Arena (4,663); Fort Myers, FL
01/22/2015; 7:30 pm, ESPN3	at Lipscomb	L 77–80 ^{2OT}	7–14 (1–3)	Allen Arena (3,681); Nashville, TN
01/24/2015; 1:00 pm, ESPN3	at Northern Kentucky	L 59–81	7–15 (1–4)	The Bank of Kentucky Center (1,443); Highland Heights, KY
01/29/2015; 7:00 pm, ESPN3	USC Upstate	L 65–78	7–16 (1–5)	Veterans Memorial Arena (277); Jacksonville, FL
01/31/2015; 2:00 pm, ESPN3	Kennesaw State	L 50–51	7–17 (1–6)	Veterans Memorial Arena (277); Jacksonville, FL
02/06/2015; 7:00 pm, ESPN3	at North Florida	L 50–77	7–18 (1–7)	UNF Arena (5,102); Jacksonville, FL
02/12/2015; 7:00 pm, ESPN3	at Kennesaw State	L 65–78	7–19 (1–8)	KSU Convocation Center (872); Kennesaw, GA
02/14/2015; 2:00 pm, ESPN3	at USC Upstate	W 89–70	8–19 (2–8)	G. B. Hodge Center (648); Spartanburg, SC
02/19/2015; 7:00 pm, ESPN3	Northern Kentucky	W 83–75 ^{OT}	9–19 (3–8)	Swisher Gymnasium (713); Jacksonville, FL
02/21/2015; 2:00 pm, ESPN3	Lipscomb	L 83–87	9–20 (3–9)	Swisher Gymnasium (742); Jacksonville, FL
02/25/2015; 7:00 pm, ESPN3	at Stetson	L 67–70	9–21 (3–10)	Edmunds Center (807); DeLand, FL
02/28/2015; 2:00 pm, ESPN3	Florida Gulf Coast	W 75–67	10–21 (4–10)	Swisher Gymnasium (477); Jacksonville, FL
Atlantic Sun tournament
03/03/2015; 7:00 pm, ESPN3	at Florida Gulf Coast; Quarterfinals	L 63–81	10–22	Alico Arena (3,567); Fort Myers, FL
*Non-conference game. ^{#}Rankings from AP Poll. (#) Tournament seedings in parentheses. All times are in Eastern Time.
