= 2014–15 USC Upstate Spartans men's basketball team =

American college basketball season

2014–15 USC Upstate Spartans men's basketball

CIT, second round
- Conference: Atlantic Sun Conference
- Record: 24–12 (8–6 ASUN)
- Head coach: Eddie Payne (13th season)
- Assistant coaches: Kyle Perry; Kente Hart; Luke Payne
- Home arena: G. B. Hodge Center

2014–15 Atlantic Sun men's basketball standings
	Conf.				Overall
Team	W		L	PCT	W		L	PCT
North Florida †	12	–	2	.857	23	–	12	.657
Florida Gulf Coast	11	–	3	.786	22	–	11	.667
USC Upstate	8	–	6	.571	24	–	12	.667
Lipscomb	7	–	7	.500	14	–	17	.452
Northern Kentucky*	7	–	7	.500	13	–	17	.433
Jacksonville	4	–	10	.286	10	–	22	.313
Kennesaw State	4	–	10	.286	10	–	22	.313
Stetson	3	–	11	.214	9	–	22	.290
† 2015 Atlantic Sun Tournament winner *NKU was eligible for A-Sun Tourney, but not for postseason play due to Div. I transition

The 2014–15 USC Upstate Spartans men's basketball team represented the University of South Carolina Upstate during the 2014–15 NCAA Division I men's basketball season. The Spartans, led by 13th-year head coach Eddie Payne, played their home games at the G. B. Hodge Center in Spartanburg, South Carolina and were members of the Atlantic Sun Conference (ASUN). They finished the season 24–11, 8–6 in ASUN play, to finish in third place. They advanced to the championship game of the ASUN tournament where they lost to North Florida. They were invited to the CollegeInsider.com Tournament where they defeated James Madison in the first round before losing in the second round to UT Martin.

== Roster ==
Number	Name	Position	Height	Weight	Year	Hometown
0	Damian Goodwin	Forward	6' 7"	195	Sophomore	Atlanta, GA
1	Mike Cunningham	Guard	6' 1"	190	Freshman	Washington, D.C.
2	Marvin Smith	Forward	6' 4"	197	Junior	Memphis, TN
3	Karim Mawuenyega	Guard	6' 0"	170	Sophomore	Douglasville, GA
4	Ramel Thompkins	Forward	6' 6"	195	Freshman	Vidalia, GA
5	Ty Greene	Guard	6' 3"	185	Senior	Knoxville, TN
10	Josh Cuthbertson	Forward	6' 5"	185	Sophomore	New Bern, NC
14	Tristan Thomas	Guard	6' 3"	190	Sophomore	Bangor, ME
15	ShunQuez Stephens	Forward	6' 5"	245	Junior	Flowery Branch, GA
21	Daniel Bridges	Forward	6' 7"	180	Freshman	Inman, SC
31	Mario Blessing	Guard	6' 2"	165	Senior	Kusterdingen, Germany
32	Fred Miller	Guard	6' 4"	200	Senior	Atlanta, GA
33	Jacob Schulte	Forward	6' 6"	222	Freshman	Newport, KY
44	Michael Buchanan	Center	6' 11"	250	Sophomore	Las Vegas, NV

== Schedule ==
Date time, TV	Opponent	Result	Record	Site (attendance) city, state
Regular season
November 15, 2014*; 7:30 p.m., ESPN3	Florida A&M	W 78–65	1–0	Hodge Center (866); Spartanburg, SC
November 17, 2014*; 7:30 p.m.	at North Carolina A&T	W 63–46	2–0	Corbett Sports Center (816); Greensboro, NC
November 20, 2014*; 7:00 p.m.	Bob Jones	W 107–41	3–0	Hodge Center (711); Spartanburg, SC
November 23, 2014*; 6:00 p.m., ESPN3	at UCF	L 69–76	3–1	CFE Arena (3,413); Orlando, FL
November 27, 2014*; 3:30 p.m., ESPN3	FIU; USC Upstate Tournament	W 68–53	4–1	Hodge Center (488); Spartanburg, SC
November 28, 2014*; 6:00 p.m., ESPN3	Cal State Fullerton; USC Upstate Tournament	W 79–64	5–2	Hodge Center (618); Spartanburg, SC
November 29, 2014*; 6:00 p.m., ESPN3	Wright State; USC Upstate Tournament	L 51–56	5–2	Hodge Center (629); Spartanburg, SC
December 1, 2014*; 7:00 p.m.	Barber–Scotia	W 105–43	6–2	Hodge Center (522); Spartanburg, SC
December 4, 2014*; 7:00 p.m., ESPN3	North Carolina A&T	W 65–54	7–2	Hodge Center (688); Spartanburg, SC
December 6, 2014*; 12:00 p.m., ESPN3	at Georgia Tech	W 59–54	8–2	McCamish Pavilion (4,901); Atlanta, GA
December 13, 2014*; 11:00 a.m., BTN	at No. 19 Maryland	L 57–67	8–3	Xfinity Center (9,093); College Park, MD
December 17, 2014*; 7:00 p.m., ESPN3	at Memphis	L 73–83	8–4	FedEx Forum (13,020); Memphis, TN
December 20, 2014*; 4:00 p.m.	vs. Mississippi State; Jackson Showcase	W 53–51	9–4	Mississippi Coliseum (1,102); Jackson, MS
December 30, 2014*; 7:00 p.m.	Montreat	W 101–55	10–4	Hodge Center (398); Spartanburg, SC
January 3, 2015*; 4:00 p.m., ESPN3	Hampton	W 68–54	11–4	Hodge Center (688); Spartanburg, SC
January 6, 2015*; 8:00 pm	at UMKC	W 61–49	12–4	Municipal Auditorium (926); Kansas City, MO
January 10, 2015; 2:00 p.m., ESPN3	Kennesaw State	W 68–65	13–4 (1–0)	Hodge Center (711); Spartanburg, SC
January 13, 2015; 7:30 p.m., ESPN3	at Lipscomb	L 58–60	13–5 (1–1)	Allen Arena (512); Nashville, TN
January 17, 2015; 2:00 p.m., ESPN3	Northern Kentucky	L 65–66	13–6 (1–2)	Hodge Center (801); Spartanburg, SC
January 22, 2015; 7:00 p.m., ESPN3	Florida Gulf Coast	L 68–71	13–7 (1–3)	Hodge Center (837); Spartanburg, SC
January 24, 2015; 2:00 p.m., ESPN3	Stetson	W 91–67	14–7 (2–3)	Hodge Center (837); Spartanburg, SC
January 29, 2015; 7:00 p.m., ESPN3	at Jacksonville	W 78–65	15–7 (3–3)	Jacksonville Veterans Memorial Arena (277); Jacksonville, FL
January 31, 2015; 7:00 p.m., ESPN3	at North Florida	W 79–74	16–7 (4–3)	UNF Arena (2,002); Jacksonville, FL
February 3, 2015*; 2:00 p.m.	St. Andrews	W 79–39	17–7	Hodge Center (676); Spartanburg, SC
February 7, 2015; 3:00 p.m., ESPN3	at Kennesaw State	W 74–46	18–7 (5–3)	KSU Convocation Center (1,583); Kennesaw, GA
February 12, 2015; 7:00 p.m., ESPN3	North Florida	W 80–63	19–7 (6–3)	Hodge Center (807); Spartanburg, SC
February 14, 2015; 2:00 p.m., ESPN3	Jacksonville	L 70–89	19–8 (6–4)	Hodge Center (648); Spartanburg, SC
February 19, 2015; 7:00 p.m., ESPN3	at Stetson	W 73–54	20–8 (7–4)	Edmunds Center (748); DeLand, FL
February 21, 2015; 7:00 p.m., ESPN3	at Florida Gulf Coast	L 72–86	20–9 (7–5)	Alico Arena (4,633); Fort Myers, FL
February 25, 2015; 6:00 p.m., ESPN3	Lipscomb	W 70–47	21–9 (8–5)	Hodge Center (712); Spartanburg, SC
February 28, 2015; 7:00 p.m., ESPN3	at Northern Kentucky	L 65–84	21–10 (8–6)	The Bank of Kentucky Center (2,064); Highland Heights, KY
Atlantic Sun tournament
March 3, 2015; 7:00 p.m., ESPN3	Kennesaw State; Quarterfinals	W 90–54	22–10	Hodge Center (714); Spartanburg, SC
March 5, 2015; 7:00 p.m., ESPN3	at Florida Gulf Coast; Semifinals	W 63–62	23–10	Alico Arena (4,267); Fort Myers, FL
March 8, 2015; 2:30 p.m., ESPN2	at North Florida; Championship game	L 57–63	23–11	UNF Arena (6,155); Jacksonville, FL
CIT
March 17, 2015*; 7:00 p.m., ESPN3	James Madison; First round	W 73–72	24–11	Hodge Center (711); Spartanburg, SC
March 21, 2015*; 5:00 p.m., ESPN3	UT Martin; Second round	L 49–60	24–12	Hodge Center (688); Spartanburg, SC
*Non-conference game. ^{#}Rankings from AP poll. (#) Tournament seedings in parentheses. All times are in Eastern.
