= 2014–15 Kennesaw State Owls men's basketball team =

American college basketball season

2014–15 Kennesaw State Owls men's basketball
- Conference: Atlantic Sun Conference
- Record: 10–22 (4–10 A-Sun)
- Head coach: Jimmy Lallathin (1st season)
- Assistant coaches: David Rivers; Jon Cremins; Brian Lawhon
- Home arena: KSU Convocation Center

2014–15 Atlantic Sun men's basketball standings
	Conf.				Overall
Team	W		L	PCT	W		L	PCT
North Florida †	12	–	2	.857	23	–	12	.657
Florida Gulf Coast	11	–	3	.786	22	–	11	.667
USC Upstate	8	–	6	.571	24	–	12	.667
Lipscomb	7	–	7	.500	14	–	17	.452
Northern Kentucky*	7	–	7	.500	13	–	17	.433
Jacksonville	4	–	10	.286	10	–	22	.313
Kennesaw State	4	–	10	.286	10	–	22	.313
Stetson	3	–	11	.214	9	–	22	.290
† 2015 Atlantic Sun Tournament winner *NKU was eligible for A-Sun Tourney, but not for postseason play due to Div. I transition

The 2014–15 Kennesaw State Owls men's basketball team represented Kennesaw State University during the 2014–15 NCAA Division I men's basketball season. The Owls, led by first-year head coach Jimmy Lallathin, played their home games at the KSU Convocation Center and were members of the Atlantic Sun Conference. They finished the season 10–22, 4–10 in A-Sun play to finish in a tie for sixth place. They lost in the quarterfinals of the A-Sun tournament to USC Upstate.

On March 23, 2015, Kennesaw State fired head coach Jimmy Lallathin after only one season. He had taken over as the interim coach midway through the 2013–14 season, and was named the permanent head coach for 2014–15. He finished with a record of 10–22.

== Roster ==
Number	Name	Position	Height	Weight	Year	Hometown
0	Kendrick Ray	Guard	6–1	180	Junior	Middletown, New York
1	Nigel Pruitt	Forward	6–7	180	Junior	Potomac, Maryland
2	Jordan Jones	Forward	6–8	205	RS freshman	Alpharetta, Georgia
3	Delbert Love	Guard	6–0	185	Senior	Cleveland, Ohio
4	Yonel Brown	Guard	5–9	160	Junior	Lawrenceville, Georgia
5	Bernard Morena	Forward	6–8	200	Sophomore	Ivory Coast
12	Nate Rucker	Forward	6–6	240	Senior	Memphis, Tennessee
15	Cameron Neysmith	Guard	6–4	220	Sophomore	Norcross, Georgia
21	Nick Masterson	Guard	6–5	180	Freshman	Woodstock, Georgia
23	Tanner Wozniak	Guard	6–5	185	Senior	St. Petersburg, Florida
24	Orlando Coleman	Forward	6–5	195	Senior	Pleasant Grove, Alabama
25	Alijah Bennett	Guard	6–2	160	Sophomore	Long Island, New York
32	Charlie Byers	Guard	5–11	185	Senior	Cincinnati, Ohio
42	Damien Wilson	Forward	6–7	190	Freshman	Atlanta, Georgia
45	Justin Diecker	Forward	6–8	225	Freshman	Freeburg, Illinois
50	Willy Kouassi	Center	6–10	230	Junior	Ivory Coast

== Schedule ==
Date time, TV	Opponent	Result	Record	Site (attendance) city, state
Regular season
11/14/2014*; 7:00 pm, ESPN3	at No. 23 Syracuse; 2K Sports Classic	L 42–89	0–1	Carrier Dome (22,833); Syracuse, NY
11/16/2014*; 10:00 pm, P12N	at California; 2K Sports Classic	L 59–93	0–2	Haas Pavilion (4,944); Berkeley, CA
11/19/2014*; 7:00 pm	at Mercer	L 66–74	0–3	Hawkins Arena (2,647); Macon, GA
11/21/2014*; 7:00 pm	at North Dakota State; 2K Sports Classic	L 55–68	0–4	Scheels Arena (2,014); Fargo, ND
11/22/2014*; 4:30 pm	vs. Alcorn State; 2K Sports Classic	W 83–80	1–4	Scheels Arena (1,437); Fargo, ND
11/26/2014*; 2:00 pm, ESPN3	Samford	W 84–71	2–4	KSU Convocation Center (1,027); Kennesaw, GA
11/29/2014*; 12:00 pm, ESPN3	Chattanooga	W 77–69	3–4	KSU Convocation Center (842); Kennesaw, GA
12/02/2014*; 7:30 pm	at FIU	L 38–59	3–5	FIU Arena (1,042); Miami, FL
12/06/2014*; 12:00 pm, ESPN3	Kent State	L 46–58	3–6	KSU Convocation Center (927); Kennesaw, GA
12/08/2014*; 7:00 pm, FS1	at No. 15 Butler	L 51–93	3–7	Hinkle Fieldhouse (5,103); Indianapolis, IN
12/17/2014*; 7:00 pm, ESPN3	at Youngstown State	W 90–84	4–7	Beeghly Center (1,229); Youngstown, OH
12/20/2014*; 3:00 pm, ESPN3	UMBC	L 53–66	4–8	KSU Convocation Center (N/A); Kennesaw, GA
12/22/2014*; 3:00 pm, ESPN3	Elon	L 65–67	4–9	KSU Convocation Center (1,219); Kennesaw, GA
12/27/2014*; 9:00 pm, BTN	at Illinois	L 45–93	4–10	State Farm Center (16,158); Champaign, IL
12/31/2014*; 7:00 pm	at Tennessee State	L 62–73	4–11	Gentry Complex (304); Nashville, TN
01/03/2015*; 2:00 pm, ESPN3	Thomas	W 92–66	5–11	KSU Convocation Center (991); Kennesaw, GA
01/10/2015; 2:00 pm	at USC Upstate	L 65–68	5–12 (0–1)	G. B. Hodge Center (711); Spartanburg, SC
01/14/2015; 7:00 pm	at Northern Kentucky	L 72–76	5–13 (0–2)	The Bank of Kentucky Center (1,547); Highland Heights, KY
01/17/2015; 2:00 pm, ESPN3	Lipscomb	L 77–91	5–14 (0–3)	KSU Convocation Center (1,620); Kennesaw, GA
01/22/2015; 7:00 pm, ESPN3	Stetson	W 88–82	6–14 (1–3)	KSU Convocation Center (1,537); Kennesaw, GA
01/24/2015; 2:00 pm, ESPN3	Florida Gulf Coast	L 48–54	6–15 (1–4)	KSU Convocation Center (1,437); Kennesaw, GA
01/29/2015; 7:00 pm, ESPN3	at North Florida	L 67–86	6–16 (1–5)	UNF Arena (1,805); Jacksonville, FL
01/31/2015; 2:00 pm, ESPN3	at Jacksonville	W 51–50	7–16 (2–5)	Veterans Memorial Arena (277); Jacksonville, FL
02/03/2015*; 7:00 pm, ESPN3	Paine	W 80–75	8–16	KSU Convocation Center (912); Kennesaw, GA
02/07/2015; 3:00 pm, ESPN3	USC Upstate	L 46–74	8–17 (2–6)	KSU Convocation Center (1,583); Kennesaw, GA
02/12/2015; 7:00 pm, ESPN3	Jacksonville	W 78–65	9–17 (3–6)	KSU Convocation Center (872); Kennesaw, GA
02/14/2015; 2:00 pm, ESPN3	North Florida	L 51–67	9–18 (3–7)	KSU Convocation Center (761); Kennesaw, GA
02/19/2015; 7:00 pm, ESPN3	at Florida Gulf Coast	L 53–54	9–19 (3–8)	Alico Arena (4,633); Fort Myers, FL
02/21/2015; 1:00 pm	at Stetson	W 61–56	10–19 (4–8)	Edmunds Center (656); DeLand, FL
02/26/2015; 12:00 pm, ESPN3	Northern Kentucky; Postponed from 2/25/15	L 53–78	10–20 (4–9)	KSU Convocation Center (682); Kennesaw, GA
02/28/2015; 11:00 am, ESPN3	at Lipscomb	L 75–94	10–21 (4–10)	Allen Arena (682); Nashville, TN
Atlantic Sun tournament
03/03/2015; 7:00 pm, ESPN3	at USC Upstate; Quarterfinals	L 54–90	10–22	G. B. Hodge Center (714); Spartanburg, SC
*Non-conference game. ^{#}Rankings from AP Poll. (#) Tournament seedings in parentheses. All times are in Eastern Time.
