= 2014–15 Lipscomb Bisons men's basketball team =

American college basketball season

2014–15 Lipscomb Bisons men's basketball
- Conference: Atlantic Sun Conference
- Record: 14–17 (7–7 A-Sun)
- Head coach: Casey Alexander (2nd season)
- Assistant coaches: Roger Idstrom; Dwight Evans; Steve Drabyn
- Home arena: Allen Arena

2014–15 Atlantic Sun men's basketball standings
| | Conf. | | | | Overall |
| Team | W | | L | PCT | W | | L | PCT |
|---|---|---|---|---|---|---|---|---|
| North Florida † | 12 | – | 2 | .857 | 23 | – | 12 | .657 |
| Florida Gulf Coast | 11 | – | 3 | .786 | 22 | – | 11 | .667 |
| USC Upstate | 8 | – | 6 | .571 | 24 | – | 12 | .667 |
| Lipscomb | 7 | – | 7 | .500 | 14 | – | 17 | .452 |
| Northern Kentucky* | 7 | – | 7 | .500 | 13 | – | 17 | .433 |
| Jacksonville | 4 | – | 10 | .286 | 10 | – | 22 | .313 |
| Kennesaw State | 4 | – | 10 | .286 | 10 | – | 22 | .313 |
| Stetson | 3 | – | 11 | .214 | 9 | – | 22 | .290 |
† 2015 Atlantic Sun Tournament winner *NKU was eligible for A-Sun Tourney, but not for postseason play due to Div. I transition

The 2014–15 Lipscomb Bisons men's basketball team represented Lipscomb University during the 2014–15 NCAA Division I men's basketball season. The Bisons, led by second year head coach Casey Alexander, played their home games at Allen Arena and were members of the Atlantic Sun Conference. They finished the season 14–17, 7–7 in A-Sun play to finish in a tie for fourth place. They advanced to the semifinals of the A-Sun tournament where they lost to North Florida.

== Roster ==
| Number | Name | Position | Height | Weight | Year | Hometown |
|---|---|---|---|---|---|---|
| 2 | Josh Williams | Guard | 6–5 | 205 | Sophomore | Jackson, Mississippi |
| 4 | Nathan Moran | Guard | 5–9 | 150 | Freshman | Franklin, Tennessee |
| 5 | J.J. Butler | Guard | 6–2 | 185 | Junior | Abingdon, Maryland |
| 10 | Talbott Denny | Guard | 6–6 | 205 | Junior | Tucson, Arizona |
| 11 | Asa Duvall | Guard | 6–2 | 195 | Freshman | Brentwood, Tennessee |
| 14 | Chad Lang | Center | 6–11 | 310 | Senior | Marietta, Georgia |
| 15 | Dylan Green | Guard | 6–4 | 195 | Junior | Anaheim Hills, CA |
| 20 | Chad Johnson | Guard | 6–0 | 195 | Senior | Edmond, Oklahoma |
| 21 | Charles Smith | Center | 6–9 | 230 | Sophomore | Memphis, Tennessee |
| 22 | J.C. Hampton | Guard | 6–0 | 175 | Sophomore | Gainesville, Georgia |
| 23 | Aaron Korn | Guard | 6–4 | 195 | Freshman | Frankton, Indiana |
| 32 | Brett Wishon | Forward | 6–9 | 220 | Sophomore | Concord, North Carolina |
| 35 | Martin Smith | Forward | 6–5 | 200 | Senior | Clarksville, Tennessee |
| 52 | Malcolm Smith | Forward | 6–5 | 210 | Senior | Clarksville, Tennessee |
| 55 | George Brammeier | Center | 6–10 | 240 | Freshman | Brandon, Florida |

== Schedule ==
| Date time, TV | Opponent | Result | Record | Site (attendance) city, state |
Regular season
| 11/14/2014*; 8:00 pm | Berry | W 91–70 | 1–0 | Allen Arena (865); Nashville, TN |
| 11/17/2014*; 6:30 pm, ESPN3 | Belmont | L 62–87 | 1–1 | Allen Arena (4,734); Nashville, TN |
| 11/20/2014*; 8:00 pm, FSN | at Vanderbilt | L 62–72 | 1–3 | Memorial Gymnasium (8,415); Nashville, TN |
| 11/22/2014*; 6:30 pm, ESPN3 | Transylvania | W 74–63 | 2–2 | Allen Arena (463); Nashville, TN |
| 11/24/2014*; 7:00 pm | at Belmont | L 77–82 | 2–3 | Curb Event Center (3,018); Nashville, TN |
| 11/30/2014*; 1:00 pm, P12N | at Colorado | L 75–84 | 2–4 | Coors Events Center (8,403); Boulder, CO |
| 12/03/2014*; 6:15 pm | at Tennessee Tech | L 79–84 | 2–5 | Eblen Center (1,150); Cookeville, TN |
| 12/06/2014*; 4:00 pm, ESPN3 | Tennessee State | W 77–68 | 3–5 | Allen Arena (804); Nashville, TN |
| 12/13/2014*; 4:00 pm | at Austin Peay | W 68–59 | 4–5 | Dunn Center (2086); Clarksville, TN |
| 12/16/2014*; 7:00 pm, LHN | at No. 9 Texas | L 61–106 | 4–6 | Frank Erwin Center (8,653); Austin, TX |
| 12/19/2014*; 7:00 pm | at Princeton | L 55–77 | 4–7 | Jadwin Gymnasium (1,818); Princeton, NJ |
| 12/21/2014*; 2:00 pm, ESPN3 | Austin Peay | W 69–63 | 5–7 | Allen Arena (502); Nashville, TN |
| 12/29/2014*; 6:00 pm | at Chattanooga | L 60–78 | 5–8 | McKenzie Arena (2,749); Chattanooga, TN |
| 01/03/2015*; 4:00 pm, SECN | at Missouri | L 60–72 | 5–9 | Mizzou Arena (7,415); Columbia, MO |
| 01/05/2015*; 7:30 pm, ESPN3 | Rhodes | W 90–53 | 6–9 | Allen Arena (704); Nashville, TN |
| 01/10/2015; 6:30 pm, ESPN3 | Northern Kentucky | W 80–61 | 7–9 (1–0) | Allen Arena (621); Nashville, TN |
| 01/13/2015; 6:30 pm, ESPN3 | USC Upstate | W 60–58 | 8–9 (2–0) | Allen Arena (512); Nashville, TN |
| 01/17/2015; 1:00 pm, ESPN3 | at Kennesaw State | W 91–77 | 9–9 (3–0) | KSU Convocation Center (1,620); Kennesaw, GA |
| 01/22/2015; 6:30 pm, ESPN3 | Jacksonville | W 80–77 ^{2OT} | 10–9 (4–0) | Allen Arena (3,681); Nashville, TN |
| 01/24/2015; 4:00 pm, ESPN3 | North Florida | L 66–75 | 10–10 (4–1) | Allen Arena (3,942); Nashville, TN |
| 01/29/2015; 6:00 pm, ESPN3 | at Florida Gulf Coast | L 62–78 | 10–11 (4–2) | Alico Arena (4,177); Fort Myers, FL |
| 01/31/2015; 6:00 pm, ESPN3 | at Stetson | L 73–75 | 10–12 (4–3) | Edmunds Center (1,027); DeLand, FL |
| 02/07/2015; 6:00 pm, ESPN3 | at Northern Kentucky | L 60–77 | 10–13 (4–4) | The Bank of Kentucky Center (3,887); Highland Heights, KY |
| 02/12/2015; 6:30 pm, ESPN3 | Stetson | W 87–85 | 11–13 (5–4) | Allen Arena (1,122); Nashville, TN |
| 02/14/2015; 4:00 pm, ESPN3 | Florida Gulf Coast | L 74–76 | 11–14 (5–5) | Allen Arena (1,213); Nashville, TN |
| 02/19/2015; 6:00 pm, ESPN3 | at North Florida | L 78–93 | 11–15 (5–6) | UNF Arena (1,528); Jacksonville, FL |
| 02/21/2015; 1:00 pm, ESPN3 | at Jacksonville | W 87–83 | 12–15 (6–6) | Swisher Gymnasium (742); Jacksonville, FL |
| 02/25/2015; 5:00 pm, ESPN3 | at USC Upstate | L 47–70 | 12–16 (6–7) | G. B. Hodge Center (712); Spartanburg, SC |
| 02/28/2015; 10:00 am, ESPN3 | Kennesaw State | W 94–75 | 13–16 (7–7) | Allen Arena (682); Nashville, TN |
Atlantic Sun tournament
| 03/03/2015; 7:00 pm, ESPN3 | at Northern Kentucky; Quarterfinals | W 76–73 ^{OT} | 14–16 | The Bank of Kentucky Center (1,157); Highland Heights, KY |
| 03/05/2015; 7:00 pm, ESPN3 | at North Florida; Semifinals | L 57–71 | 14–17 | UNF Arena (4,106); Jacksonville, FL |
*Non-conference game. ^{#}Rankings from AP Poll. (#) Tournament seedings in parentheses. All times are in Central Time.
