= 2014–15 North Florida Ospreys men's basketball team =

American college basketball season

2014–15 North Florida Ospreys men's basketball
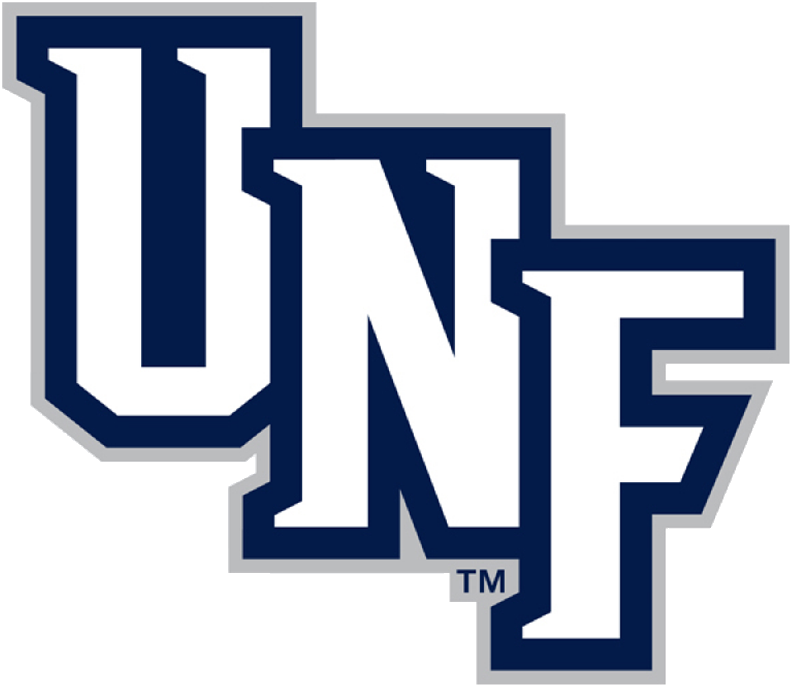

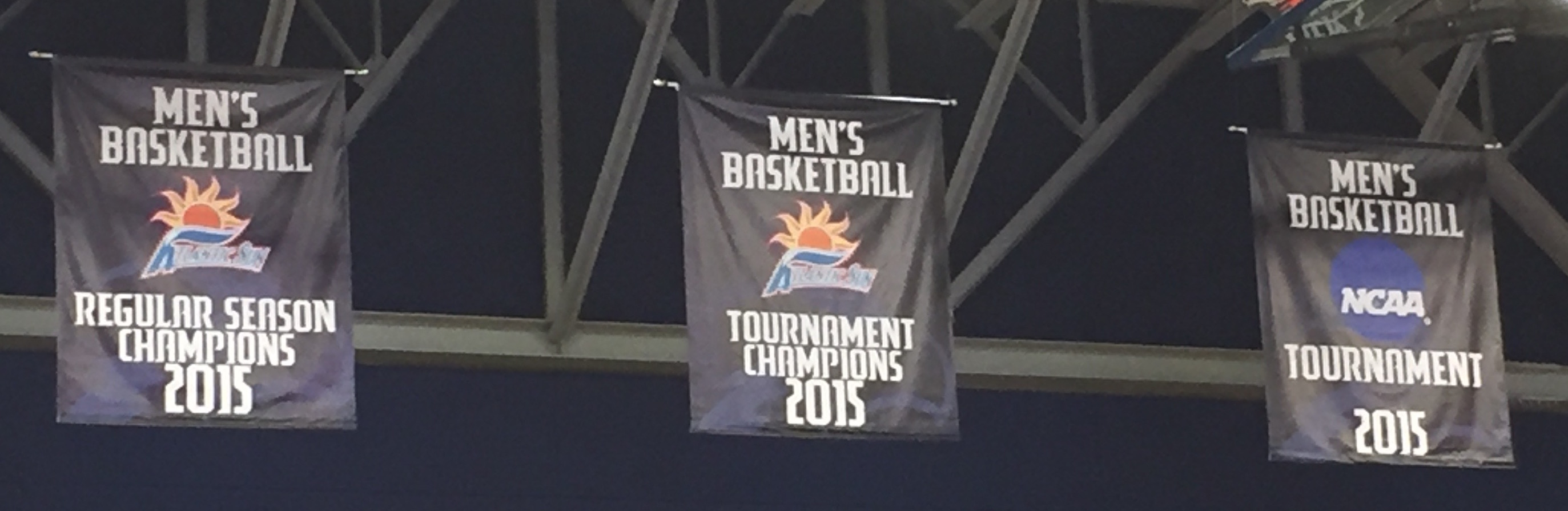

Atlantic Sun regular season and tournament champions Cancún Challenge Mayan Division champions

NCAA tournament, First Four
- Conference: Atlantic Sun Conference
- Record: 23–12 (12–2 A-Sun)
- Head coach: Matthew Driscoll (6th season)
- Assistant coaches: Bobby Kennen; Stephen Perkins; Byron Taylor
- Home arena: UNF Arena

2014–15 Atlantic Sun men's basketball standings
	Conf.				Overall
Team	W		L	PCT	W		L	PCT
North Florida †	12	–	2	.857	23	–	12	.657
Florida Gulf Coast	11	–	3	.786	22	–	11	.667
USC Upstate	8	–	6	.571	24	–	12	.667
Lipscomb	7	–	7	.500	14	–	17	.452
Northern Kentucky*	7	–	7	.500	13	–	17	.433
Jacksonville	4	–	10	.286	10	–	22	.313
Kennesaw State	4	–	10	.286	10	–	22	.313
Stetson	3	–	11	.214	9	–	22	.290
† 2015 Atlantic Sun Tournament winner *NKU was eligible for A-Sun Tourney, but not for postseason play due to Div. I transition

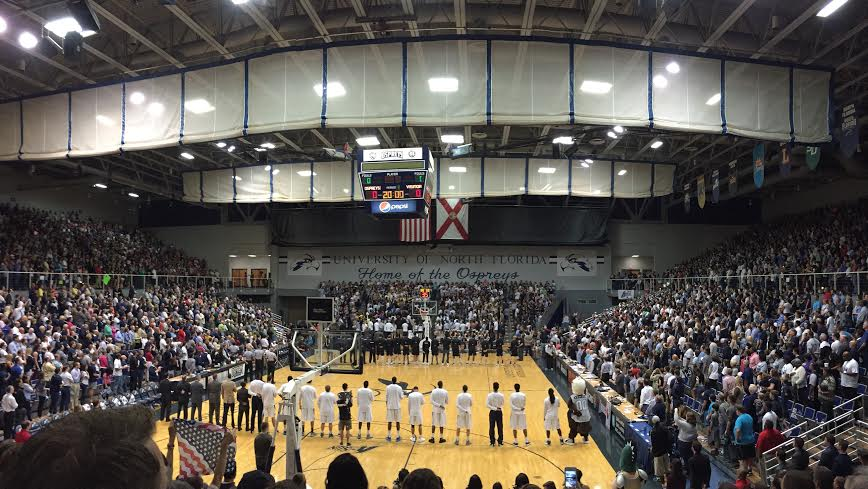
The Ospreys defeated USC Upstate to win the A-Sun Tournament title in front of a record crowd at UNF Arena

The 2014–15 North Florida Ospreys men's basketball team represented the University of North Florida during the 2014–15 college basketball season. The Ospreys competed in Division I of the National Collegiate Athletic Association (NCAA) and the Atlantic Sun Conference (A-Sun). They were led by sixth year head coach Matthew Driscoll, and played their home games at UNF Arena on the university's Jacksonville, Florida campus.

In their sixth season as a full Division I member, the Ospreys won their first Atlantic Sun Conference regular season and tournament championships and received their first ever NCAA tournament bid. As a No. 16 seed in the south region, they were matched up against fellow No. 16 seed Robert Morris in the First Four in Dayton, Ohio. They were defeated 77–81 despite leading by 14 points in the second half.

Nevertheless, the Ospreys set a program record for wins in a season and drew unprecedented media attention both locally and nationally. They earned the #1 seed and home court advantage in the 2015 Atlantic Sun men's basketball tournament, and advanced to the championship game where they defeated USC Upstate in front of a sold-out, record crowd of 6,155. The season also included two-game sweeps over their crosstown rivals, the Jacksonville Dolphins and conference runner-up Florida Gulf Coast. On December 6, 2014, the Ospreys upset the Purdue Boilermakers on the road, marking their first ever victory over a Big Ten Conference opponent.

Head coach Matthew Driscoll was named Atlantic Sun Coach of the Year and multiple players earned all-conference honors.

In the Week 18 AP poll released on March 9, 2015, the Ospreys received one top-25 vote, the first such occurrence in program history.

== Previous season ==
The Ospreys finished the 2013–14 season with an overall record of 16–16, 10–8 record in Atlantic Sun play. In the Atlantic Sun Conference tournament, they were defeated in the quarterfinals by USC Upstate, 80–74.

== Roster ==
Number	Name	Position	Height	Weight	Year	Hometown
0	Jalen Nesbitt	Guard	6–6	195	Senior	Inman, South Carolina
1	Karlos Odum	Forward	6–6	198	Freshman	Lakeland, Florida
2	Beau Beech	Guard/Forward	6–8	210	Junior	Ponte Vedra Beach, Florida
3	Chase Driscoll	Guard	5–8	170	Freshman	Jacksonville, Florida
4	Devin Wilson	Guard	5–11	176	Senior	Gainesville, Florida
10	Osborn Blount	Guard	5–10	173	Sophomore	Jacksonville, Florida
11	Trent Mackey	Guard	6–3	184	Junior	Tampa, Florida
12	Aaron Bodager	Guard	6–5	205	Sophomore	Oviedo, Florida
14	Dallas Moore	Guard	6–1	175	Sophomore	St. Petersburg, Florida
15	Ismaila Dauda	Center	6–9	250	Senior	Kano, Nigeria
23	Nick Malonga	Guard	6–4	197	Sophomore	Bolingbrook, Illinois
32	Demarcus Daniels	Forward	6–7	195	Junior	Ashburn, Georgia
33	Romelo Banks	Center	6–11	235	Sophomore	Kissimmee, Florida
35	Chris Davenport	Forward	6–8	210	Sophomore	Atlanta, Georgia

== Schedule and results ==
Date time, TV	Rank^{#}	Opponent^{#}	Result	Record	High points	High rebounds	High assists	Site (attendance) city, state
Non-conference regular season
Nov. 14*; 7:00 pm		at South Carolina	L 56–81	0–1	21 – Moore	6 – Nesbitt	3 – Mackey	Colonial Life Arena (10,473); Columbia, SC
Nov. 17*; 7:00 pm		Webber International	W 79–55	1–1	22 – Moore	6 – Tied	5 – Beech	UNF Arena (1,622); Jacksonville, FL
Nov. 20*; 8:00 pm		at Northwestern; Cancún Challenge	L 67–69	1–2	18 – Moore	8 – Nesbitt	5 – Moore	Welsh-Ryan Arena (5,783); Evanston, IL
Nov. 22*; 2:00 pm		at Northern Iowa; Cancún Challenge	L 49–66	1–3	15 – Nesbitt	8 – Davenport	3 – Moore	McLeod Center (3,220); Cedar Falls, IA
Nov. 25*; 4:00 pm		vs. Liberty; Cancún Challenge Mayan Division	W 77–57	2–3	20 – Moore	7 – Banks	4 – Moore	Hard Rock Hotel Riviera Maya (215); Cancún, MX
Nov. 26*; 4:00 pm		vs. Elon; Cancún Challenge Mayan Division	W 72–65	3–3	21 – Moore	6 – Tied	6 – Nesbitt	Hard Rock Hotel Riviera Maya (540); Cancún, MX
Dec. 1*; 7:00 pm		Edward Waters	W 97–65	4–3	25 – Beech	8 – Tied	6 – Nesbitt	UNF Arena (1,263); Jacksonville, FL
Dec. 3*; 8:00 pm		at Bethune-Cookman	W 63–56	5–3	14 – Nesbitt	8 – Nesbitt	4 – Davenport	Moore Gymnasium (904); Daytona Beach, FL
Dec. 6*; 2:00 pm		at Purdue	W 73–70	6–3	24 – Moore	8 – Tied	4 – Moore	Mackey Arena (11,038); West Lafayette, IN
Dec. 15*; 7:00 pm		Tennessee Tech	L 80–82	6–4	26 – Moore	17 – Davenport	4 – Tied	UNF Arena (1,128); Jacksonville, FL
Dec. 17*; 7:00 pm, RSN		at Florida State	L 77–93	6–5	23 – Moore	5 – Tied	4 – Davenport	Donald L. Tucker Civic Center (4,969); Tallahassee, FL
Dec. 19*; 7:00 pm		at Florida A&M	W 83–65	7–5	22 – Mackey	10 – Nesbitt	6 – Tied	Teaching Gymnasium (N/A); Tallahassee, FL
Dec. 22*; 8:00 pm, ESPN3		at Iowa	L 70–80	7–6	18 – Mackey	8 – Davenport	7 – Moore	Carver–Hawkeye Arena (14,137); Iowa City, IA
Dec. 29*; 7:00 pm		at Tennessee Tech	L 84–87	7–7	20 – Moore	11 – Nesbitt	4 – Tied	Eblen Center (1,549); Cookeville, TN
Dec. 31*; 3:00 pm		at Austin Peay	L 60–65	7–8	16 – Davenport	8 – Davenport	3 – Tied	Dunn Center (1,802); Clarksville, TN
Jan. 2*; 7:00 pm, SECN+		at Alabama	L 61–76	7–9	14 – Daniels	6 – Tied	4 – Moore	Coleman Coliseum (8,821); Tuscaloosa, AL
Jan. 6*; 7:00 pm		Trinity Baptist	W 106–60	8–9	26 – Banks	6 – Tied	8 – Davenport	UNF Arena (1,715); Jacksonville, FL
Atlantic Sun Conference regular season
Jan. 10; 3:00 pm		at Jacksonville; River City Rumble	W 86–63	9–9 (1–0)	20 – Moore	9 – Davenport	2 – Tied	Veterans Memorial Arena (1,879); Jacksonville, FL
Jan. 14; 7:00 pm		Florida Gulf Coast	W 80–64	10–9 (2–0)	27 – Moore	8 – Daniels	9 – Moore	UNF Arena (3,189); Jacksonville, FL
Jan. 17; 1:00 pm		at Stetson	W 80–65	11–9 (3–0)	17 – Tied	12 – Daniels	6 – Nesbitt	Edmunds Center (1,262); DeLand, FL
Jan. 22; 7:00 pm		at Northern Kentucky	W 74–66	12–9 (4–0)	24 – Davenport	7 – Tied	4 – Moore	The Bank of Kentucky Center (2,090); Highland Heights, KY
Jan. 24; 5:00 pm		at Lipscomb	W 75–66	13–9 (5–0)	27 – Beech	7 – Tied	7 – Moore	Allen Arena (3,942); Nashville, TN
Jan. 29; 7:00 pm		Kennesaw State	W 86–67	14–9 (6–0)	17 – Tied	8 – Davenport	9 – Moore	UNF Arena (1,805); Jacksonville, FL
Jan. 31; 7:00 pm, ESPN3		USC Upstate	L 74–79	14–10 (6–1)	23 – Beech	7 – Tied	6 – Moore	UNF Arena (2,002); Jacksonville, FL
Feb. 6; 7:00 pm, ESPN3		Jacksonville; River City Rumble	W 77–50	15–10 (7–1)	16 – Beech	8 – Davenport	4 – Wilson	UNF Arena (5,102); Jacksonville, FL
Feb. 12; 7:00 pm, ESPN3		at USC Upstate	L 63–80	15–11 (7–2)	17 – Davenport	7 – Nesbitt	6 – Moore	G. B. Hodge Center (807); Spartanburg, SC
Feb. 14; 2:00 pm, ESPN3		at Kennesaw State	W 67–51	16–11 (8–2)	14 – Davenport	6 – Tied	6 – Nesbitt	KSU Convocation Center (761); Kennesaw, GA
Feb. 19; 7:00 pm, ESPN3		Lipscomb	W 93–78	17–11 (9–2)	21 – Moore	11 – Nesbitt	5 – Nesbitt	UNF Arena (1,528); Jacksonville, FL
Feb. 21; 7:00 pm, ESPN3		Northern Kentucky	W 88–69	18–11 (10–2)	26 – Nesbitt	10 – Beech	5 – Moore	UNF Arena (1,427); Jacksonville, FL
Feb. 25; 7:00 pm, ESPN3		at Florida Gulf Coast	W 76–62	19–11 (11–2)	22 – Beech	13 – Beech	2 – Tied	Alico Arena (4,692); Fort Myers, FL
Feb. 28; 7:00 pm, ESPN3		Stetson	W 86–71	20–11 (12–2)	21 – Moore	9 – Davenport	5 – Nesbitt	UNF Arena (3,793); Jacksonville, FL
Atlantic Sun tournament
Mar. 3; 7:30 pm, ESPN3	(1)	(8) Stetson; Quarterfinals	W 81–67	21–11	19 – Beech	11 – Daniels	6 – Nesbitt	UNF Arena (3,313); Jacksonville, FL
Mar. 5; 7:00 pm, ESPN3	(1)	(5) Lipscomb; Semifinals	W 71–57	22–11	36 – Moore	9 – Davenport	5 – Nesbitt	UNF Arena (4,106); Jacksonville, FL
Mar. 8; 2:30 pm, ESPN2	(1)	(3) USC Upstate; Championship game	W 63–57	23–11	22 – Daniels	10 – Davenport	3 – Tied	UNF Arena (6,155); Jacksonville, FL
NCAA tournament
Mar. 18*; 6:40 pm, truTV	(16 S)	vs. (16 S) Robert Morris; First Four	L 77–81	23–12	28 – Beech	9 – Nesbitt	5 – Moore	UD Arena (12,592); Dayton, OH
*Non-conference game. ^{#}Rankings from AP Poll. (#) Tournament seedings in parentheses. S=South region. All times are in Eastern Time.

== Awards and honors ==
Beau Beech, guard

- Atlantic Sun All-Conference First Team

Demarcus Daniels, forward

- Atlantic Sun Defensive Player of the Year
- Atlantic Sun All-Academic Team
- Atlantic Sun Tournament MVP
- Finalist, Lefty Driesell National Defensive Player of the Year

Matthew Driscoll, head coach

- Atlantic Sun Coach of the Year

Trent Mackey, guard

- Atlantic Sun All-Academic Team

Dallas Moore, guard

- Atlantic Sun All-Conference First Team
- Atlantic Sun All-Tournament Team

Jalen Nesbitt, guard

- Atlantic Sun All-Tournament Team
