= 2014–15 Missouri Tigers men's basketball team =

American college basketball season

2014–15 Missouri Tigers men's basketball
- Conference: Southeastern Conference
- Record: 9–23 (3–15 SEC)
- Head coach: Kim Anderson (1st Year)
- Assistant coaches: Tim Fuller (4th Year); Brad Loos (1st Year); Rob Fulford (1st Year)
- Home arena: Mizzou Arena

2014–15 Southeastern Conference men's basketball standings
	Conf.				Overall
Team	W		L	PCT	W		L	PCT
No. 1 Kentucky †	18	–	0	1.000	38	–	1	.974
No. 21 Arkansas	13	–	5	.722	27	–	9	.750
LSU	11	–	7	.611	22	–	11	.667
Georgia	11	–	7	.611	21	–	12	.636
Texas A&M	11	–	7	.611	21	–	12	.636
Ole Miss	11	–	7	.611	21	–	13	.618
Vanderbilt	9	–	9	.500	21	–	14	.600
Alabama	8	–	10	.444	19	–	15	.559
Florida	8	–	10	.444	16	–	17	.485
Tennessee	7	–	11	.389	16	–	16	.500
South Carolina	6	–	12	.333	17	–	16	.515
Mississippi State	6	–	12	.333	13	–	19	.406
Auburn	4	–	14	.222	15	–	20	.429
Missouri	3	–	15	.167	9	–	23	.281
† 2015 SEC tournament winner Rankings from AP poll

The 2014–15 Missouri Tigers men's basketball team represented the University of Missouri in the 2014–15 NCAA Division I men's basketball season. Their head coach was Kim Anderson, who was in his first year as the head coach at Missouri. The team played its home games at Mizzou Arena in Columbia, Missouri, and played its third season in the Southeastern Conference. They finished the season 9–23, 3–15 in SEC play to finish in last place. They lost in the first round of the SEC tournament to South Carolina.

== Preseason ==
Coming off an inconsistent 2013–14 season that saw Missouri finish with a 23-12 (9-9) record and a trip to the NIT there were many changes that took place in the off/preseason. The team lost the likes of Jabari Brown and Jordan Clarkson to the NBA draft and lost Criswell and Ross to graduation. On April 10, 2014, then head coach Frank Haith kicked Zach Price off the team for legal reasons. The following week on April 18 it was announced that Haith was leaving Missouri and had taken the opening as the head coach of Tulsa. Aften ten days of speculation it was announced that Kim Anderson would be returning to his alma mater and become the next head coach at Missouri. The team returned two starters (Ryan Rosburg, Johnathan Williams III), five incoming freshmen (Gant, Wright, Allen, Isabell, Gill-Caesar), and one transfer (Shamburger) making this Missouri Tiger team one of the youngest in the Nation.

=== Departures ===
Name	Number	Pos.	Height	Weight	Year	Hometown	Notes
Tony Criswell	2	F	6'9"	240	Sr.	Oklahoma City, Oklahoma	Graduated
Jordan Clarkson	5	G	6'5"	180	RS Jr.	San Antonio, Texas	Entered 2014 NBA draft
Shane Rector	11	G	6'1"	171	Fr.	Bronx, New York	Transferred
Torren Jones	24	F	6'8"	218	So.	Chandler, Arizona	Dismissed From Team
Zach Price	25	C	6'10"	250	Jr.	Cleveland, Ohio	Kicked Off Team
Jabari Brown	32	G	6'5"	205	Jr.	Oakland, California	Entered 2014 NBA draft
Earnest Ross	33	G	6'5"	222	RS Sr.	Cary, North Carolina	Graduated

=== 2014 Recruits ===
College recruiting
Name	Hometown	School	Height	Weight	Commit date
JaKeenan Gant; PF	Springfield, GA	Effingham County	6 ft 8 in (2.03 m)	210 lb (95 kg)	Aug 18, 2013
JaKeenan Gant; PF	Recruit ratings: Scout: Rivals: 247Sports: ESPN:				
Namon Wright; SG	Los Angeles, CA	Pacific Hills	6 ft 4 in (1.93 m)	175 lb (79 kg)	Sep 28, 2013
Namon Wright; SG	Recruit ratings: Scout: Rivals: 247Sports: ESPN:				
D'Angelo Allen; SF	Dallas, TX	Kimball	6 ft 6 in (1.98 m)	185 lb (84 kg)	May 4, 2014
D'Angelo Allen; SF	Recruit ratings: Scout: Rivals: 247Sports: ESPN:				
Tramaine Isabell; PG	Seattle, WA	Garfield	6 ft 1 in (1.85 m)	170 lb (77 kg)	Jun 26, 2014
Tramaine Isabell; PG	Recruit ratings: Scout: Rivals: 247Sports: ESPN:				
Montaque Gill-Caesar; SF	Huntington, West Virginia	Huntington Prep	6 ft 6 in (1.98 m)	195 lb (88 kg)	Aug 2, 2014
Montaque Gill-Caesar; SF	Recruit ratings: Scout: Rivals: 247Sports: ESPN:				
Overall recruit ranking:
Note: In many cases, Scout, Rivals, 247Sports, On3, and ESPN may conflict in their listings of height and weight.; In these cases, the average was taken. ESPN grades are on a 100-point scale.; Sources:

=== 2015 Recruits ===
College recruiting (2015)
Name	Hometown	School	Height	Weight	Commit date
Kevin Puryear; PF	Blue Springs, MO	Blue Springs South	6 ft 7 in (2.01 m)	225 lb (102 kg)	Aug 21, 2014
Kevin Puryear; PF	Recruit ratings: Scout: Rivals: 247Sports:				
Cullen VanLeer; SG	Pacific, MO	Pacific	6 ft 4 in (1.93 m)	195 lb (88 kg)	Sep 5, 2014
Cullen VanLeer; SG	Recruit ratings: Rivals: 247Sports: ESPN:				
Terrance Phillips; PG	Mouth of Wilson, VA	Oak Hill Academy	5 ft 10 in (1.78 m)	170 lb (77 kg)	Jan 3, 2015
Terrance Phillips; PG	Recruit ratings: Scout: Rivals: 247Sports: ESPN:				
Overall recruit ranking:
Note: In many cases, Scout, Rivals, 247Sports, On3, and ESPN may conflict in their listings of height and weight.; In these cases, the average was taken. ESPN grades are on a 100-point scale.; Sources:

== Roster ==
2014–15 Missouri Tigers men's basketball team
Players
Coaches

Pos.	#	Name	Height	Weight	Year	Previous school	Hometown
G	2	Deuce Bello	6 ft 4 in (1.93 m)	177 lb (80 kg)	RS Jr	Westchester Country Day; Baylor	Greensboro, North Carolina
F	3	Johnathan Williams	6 ft 9 in (2.06 m)	208 lb (94 kg)	So	Southwind	Memphis, Tennessee
G	4	Tramaine Isabell	6 ft 1 in (1.85 m)	185 lb (84 kg)	Fr	Garfield	Seattle, Washington
F	5	D'Angelo Allen	6 ft 6 in (1.98 m)	185 lb (84 kg)	Fr	Kimball	Dallas, Texas
G	11	Jimmy Barton (W)	5 ft 9 in (1.75 m)	160 lb (73 kg)	So	Houston Baptist	St. Louis, MO
G	12	Namon Wright	6 ft 4 in (1.93 m)	175 lb (79 kg)	Fr	Pacific Hills	Los Angeles, California
G	13	Montaque Gill-Caesar	6 ft 6 in (1.98 m)	215 lb (98 kg)	Fr	Huntington Prep	Vaughan, Ontario
G	14	Keith Shamburger	5 ft 11 in (1.8 m)	170 lb (77 kg)	RS Sr	Hawaii	Gardena, California
G	15	Wes Clark (injured)	6 ft 0 in (1.83 m)	171 lb (78 kg)	So	Romulus	Detroit, Michigan
F	23	JaKeenan Gant	6 ft 8 in (2.03 m)	200 lb (91 kg)	Fr	Osage	Osage Beach, Missouri
F	42	Hayden Barnard (W)	6 ft 10 in (2.08 m)	215 lb (98 kg)	RS Fr	Metea Valley H.S.	Aurora, Illinois
C	44	Ryan Rosburg	6 ft 11 in (2.11 m)	245 lb (111 kg)	Jr	Marquette	Chesterfield, MO
F	45	Keanau Post	6 ft 11 in (2.11 m)	268 lb (122 kg)	Sr	Southwestern Illinois College	Victoria, British Columbia

Head coach

- Kim Anderson (Missouri)

Assistant coach(es)

- Tim Fuller (Wake Forest)
- Brad Loos (Austin Peay)
- Rob Fulford (Marshall)

Legend

- (C) Team captain
- (S) Suspended
- (I) Ineligible
- (W) Walk-on
- Injured
- Current redshirt

Roster
Last update: 2015-02-17

== Schedule and results ==
Date time, TV	Opponent	Result	Record	High points	High rebounds	High assists	Site (attendance) city, state
Exhibition
Oct. 29*; 7:00 pm	William Jewell	W 72–31		14 – Clark	8 – Rosburg	4 – Shamburger	Hearnes Center; Columbia, MO
Nov. 8*; 2:00 pm	Missouri–St. Louis	W 77–56		19 – Gill-Caesar	12 – Williams III	6 – Shamburger	Mizzou Arena; Columbia, MO
Non-conference regular season
Nov. 14*; 8:00 pm	UMKC; Maui Invitational Opening Round	L 61–69	0–1	21 – Gill-Caesar	7 – Gill-Caesar	5 – Clark	Mizzou Arena (7,014); Columbia, MO
Nov. 16*; 5:00 pm, SECN	Valparaiso	W 56–41	1–1	16 – Clark	8 – Rosburg	4 – Shamburger	Mizzou Arena (5,369); Columbia, MO
Nov. 19*; 7:00 pm	Oral Roberts	W 78–64	2–1	19 – Gill-Caesar	6 – Rosburg	9 – Clark	Mizzou Arena (5,563); Columbia, MO
Nov. 24*; 4:00 pm, ESPN2	vs. No. 3 Arizona; Maui Invitational Quarterfinals	L 53–72	2–2	13 – Gill-Caesar	7 – Post	3 – Shamburger	Lahaina Civic Center (2,400); Maui, HI
Nov. 25*; 1:30 pm, ESPN2	vs. Purdue; Maui Invitational Consolation 2nd Round	L 61–82	2–3	14 – Williams III	5 – Willlams III	2 – Isabell, Shamburger	Lahaina Civic Center (2,400); Maui, HI
Nov. 26*; 1:30 pm, ESPNU	vs. Chaminade; Maui Invitational 7th Place Game	W 74–60	3–3	21 – Wright	9 – Clark	5 – Shamburger	Lahaina Civic Center (2,400); Maui, HI
Dec. 2*; 7:00 pm	Southeast Missouri State	W 65–61	4–3	18 – Williams III	11 – Williams III	3 – Allen, Shamburger	Mizzou Arena (5,506); Columbia, MO
Dec. 5*; 8:30 pm, ESPNU	at No. 22 Oklahoma; Big 12/SEC Challenge	L 63–82	4–4	16 – Williams III	8 – Williams III	3 – Clark, Shamburger	Lloyd Noble Center (11,652); Norman, OK
Dec. 11*; 6:00 pm, SECN	Elon	W 78–73	5–4	16 – Williams III, Shamburger	8 – Williams III	5 – Shamburger	Mizzou Arena (4,514); Columbia, MO
Dec. 13*; 3:00 pm, ESPN2	Xavier	L 58–74	5–5	17 – Williams III	9 – Williams III	3 – Shamburger	Mizzou Arena (7,854); Columbia, MO
Dec. 20*; 1:00 pm, ESPN2	vs. Illinois; Braggin' Rights	L 59–62	5–6	15 – Williams III	8 – Williams III	3 – Clark	Scottrade Center (20,079); St. Louis, MO
Dec. 30*; 8:00 pm, ESPN2	vs. Oklahoma State	L 72–74 ^{OT}	5–7	22 – Williams III	9 – Williams III	5 – Shamburger	Sprint Center (11,376); Kansas City, MO
Jan. 3*; 4:00 pm, SECN	Lipscomb	W 72–60	6–7	16 – Williams III	10 – Williams III, Post	6 – Clark	Mizzou Arena (7,415); Columbia, MO
SEC regular season
Jan. 8; 6:00 pm, ESPN2	LSU	W 74–67 ^{OT}	7–7 (1–0)	21 – Williams III	10 – Williams III	5 – Shamburger, Isabell	Mizzou Arena (7,509); Columbia, MO
Jan. 10; 6:00 pm, SECN	at Auburn	L 79–85	7–8 (1–1)	21 – Shamburger	8 – Williams III	4 – Isabell	Auburn Arena (8,365); Auburn, AL
Jan. 13; 8:00 pm, ESPN	at No. 1 Kentucky	L 37–86	7–9 (1–2)	10 – Clark, Post	5 – Clark	4 – Shamburger	Rupp Arena (24,248); Lexington, KY
Jan. 17; 5:00 pm, SECN	Tennessee	L 51–59	7–10 (1–3)	13 – Wright	6 – Williams III, Shamburger	5 – Shamburger	Mizzou Arena (10,359); Columbia, MO
Jan. 21; 6:00 pm, SECN	at Texas A&M	L 50–62	7–11 (1–4)	18 – Clark	10 – Williams III	6 – Clark	Reed Arena (6,849); College Station, TX
Jan. 24; 1:00 pm, ESPN2	Arkansas	L 60–61	7–12 (1–5)	16 – Gill-Caesar	10 – Williams III	6 – Clark	Mizzou Arena (11,022); Columbia, MO
Jan. 29; 8:00 pm, ESPN	No. 1 Kentucky	L 53–69	7–13 (1–6)	19 – Clark	5 – Williams II	4 – Clark, Shamburger	Mizzou Arena (13,034); Columbia, MO
Jan. 31; 3:00 pm, FSN	Ole Miss	L 47–67	7–14 (1–7)	14 – Williams III	7 – Williams III	6 – Shamburger	Mizzou Arena (9,053); Columbia, MO
Feb. 4; 8:00 pm, SECN	at Alabama	L 49–62	7–15 (1–8)	11 – Post	6 – Williams III	11 – Shamburger	Coleman Coliseum (9,343); Tuscaloosa, AL
Feb. 7; 5:00 pm, ESPNU	Texas A&M	L 61–83	7–16 (1–9)	15 – Clark	5 – Williams III, Post, Shamburger	6 – Clark	Mizzou Arena (8,970); Columbia, MO
Feb. 10; 6:00 pm, SECN	at South Carolina	L 60–65	7–17 (1–10)	13 – Shamburger	9 – Williams III	5 – Shamburger	Colonial Life Arena (8,840); Columbia, SC
Feb. 14; 3:00 pm, ESPNU	Mississippi State	L 74–77	7–18 (1–11)	27 – Williams III	7 – Williams III, Allen	6 – Shamburger	Mizzou Arena (8,278); Columbia, MO
Feb. 18; 8:00 pm, SECN	at No. 18 Arkansas	L 69–84	7–19 (1–12)	13 – Williams III, Isabell	10 – Williams III	4 – Shamburger	Bud Walton Arena (12,693); Fayetteville, AR
Feb. 21; 1:30 pm, SECN	at Vanderbilt	L 53–76	7–20 (1–13)	11 – Gill-Caesar	5 – Williams III	8 – Shamburger	Memorial Gymnasium (10,154); Nashville, TN
Feb. 24; 8:00 pm, ESPN	Florida	W 64–52	8–20 (2–13)	28 – Wright	7 – Williams III	5 – Shamburger	Mizzou Arena (7,631); Columbia, MO
Feb. 28; 11:00 am, ESPNU	at Georgia	L 44–68	8–21 (2–14)	10 – Williams III, Wright	6 – Williams III	3 – Shamburger	Stegeman Coliseum (9,389); Athens, GA
Mar. 3; 8:00 pm, SECN	Auburn	W 63–61	9–21 (3–14)	21 – Shamburger	6 – Shamburger	4 – Shamburger	Mizzou Arena (9,121); Columbia, MO
Mar. 7; 5:30 pm, SECN	at Mississippi State	L 43–52	9–22 (3–15)	12 – Shamburger, Wright	10 – Williams III	4 – Gill-Caesar	Humphrey Coliseum (5,897); Starkville, MS
SEC Tournament
Mar. 11, 2015; 8:00 pm, SECN	vs. South Carolina	L 54–63	9–23	10 – Gill-Caesar	11 – Williams III	4 – Shamburger	Bridgestone Arena (10,039); Nashville, TN
*Non-conference game. ^{#}Rankings from AP Poll. (#) Tournament seedings in parentheses. All times are in Central Time.
