= 2014–15 Alabama Crimson Tide men's basketball team =

American college basketball season

2014–15 Alabama Crimson Tide men's basketball

NIT, Second round
- Conference: Southeastern Conference
- Record: 19–15 (8–10 SEC)
- Head coach: Anthony Grant (6th season); John Brannen (interim)
- Assistant coaches: Antoine Pettway (3rd season); Reggie Witherspoon (1st season)
- Home arena: Coleman Coliseum (Capacity: 15,316)

2014–15 Southeastern Conference men's basketball standings
	Conf.				Overall
Team	W		L	PCT	W		L	PCT
No. 1 Kentucky †	18	–	0	1.000	38	–	1	.974
No. 21 Arkansas	13	–	5	.722	27	–	9	.750
LSU	11	–	7	.611	22	–	11	.667
Georgia	11	–	7	.611	21	–	12	.636
Texas A&M	11	–	7	.611	21	–	12	.636
Ole Miss	11	–	7	.611	21	–	13	.618
Vanderbilt	9	–	9	.500	21	–	14	.600
Alabama	8	–	10	.444	19	–	15	.559
Florida	8	–	10	.444	16	–	17	.485
Tennessee	7	–	11	.389	16	–	16	.500
South Carolina	6	–	12	.333	17	–	16	.515
Mississippi State	6	–	12	.333	13	–	19	.406
Auburn	4	–	14	.222	15	–	20	.429
Missouri	3	–	15	.167	9	–	23	.281
† 2015 SEC tournament winner Rankings from AP poll

The 2014–15 Alabama Crimson Tide men's basketball team (variously "Alabama", "UA", "Bama" or "The Tide") represented the University of Alabama in the 2014–15 NCAA Division I men's basketball season. The Crimson Tide, led by 6th year head coach Anthony Grant played their home games at Coleman Coliseum in Tuscaloosa, Alabama, as a member of the Southeastern Conference. They finished the season 19–15, 8–10 in SEC play to finish in a tie for eighth place. They lost in the second round of the SEC tournament to Florida. They were invited to the National Invitation Tournament where they defeated Illinois in the first found before losing in the second round to Miami (FL).

On March 15, after losing in the SEC Tournament, head coach Anthony Grant was fired. He compiled a record of 117–85 in six seasons. Associate head coach John Brannen served as interim head coach during the Tide's two NIT games.

== Off-season ==
=== Departures ===
Name	Number	Pos.	Height	Weight	Year	Hometown	Notes
Algie Key	0	G	6'4"	175	Junior	Decatur, GA	Transferred
Carl Engström	4	C	7'1"	285	RS Junior	Ystad, Sweden	Play professionally in Europe
Trevor Releford	12	G	6'0"	195	Senior	Shawnee Mission, KS	Graduated/Undrafted in 2014 NBA draft
Julian Goode	13	F	6'7"	225	Senior	Atlanta, GA	Graduated
Nick Jacobs	15	F	6'8"	265	Junior	Atlanta, GA	Transferred to Georgia Tech
Isiah Wilson	33	G	6'3"	175	Senior	Troy, AL	Graduated

=== Incoming transfer ===
Name	Number	Pos.	Height	Weight	Year	Hometown	Previous School
John Gibson	41	F	6'7"	215	Sophomore	Marietta, GA	Transfer from Xavier University of Louisiana.

- Note: Redshirt senior Christophe Varidel transferred to Alabama from Chaminade during the 2014 offseason and would have been eligible to play immediately at the beginning of the 2014–15 season because he had already graduated school and had one year of athletic eligibility remaining, but due to lingering injuries from his time at Chaminade, Varidel made a joint decision with head coach Anthony Grant to end his college basketball career before the start of the season.

== Class of 2014 signees ==
College recruiting information
Name	Hometown	School	Height	Weight	Commit date
Justin Coleman; PG	Birmingham, AL	Wenonah High School	5 ft 10 in (1.78 m)	155 lb (70 kg)	Jul 31, 2013
Justin Coleman; PG	Recruit ratings: Scout: Rivals: 247Sports: ESPN:				
Riley Norris; SF	Albertville, AL	Albertville High School	6 ft 7 in (2.01 m)	190 lb (86 kg)	Aug 5, 2013
Riley Norris; SF	Recruit ratings: Scout: Rivals: 247Sports: ESPN:				
Devin Mitchell; SG	Suwanee, GA	Collins Hill High School	6 ft 4 in (1.93 m)	173 lb (78 kg)	Aug 7, 2013
Devin Mitchell; SG	Recruit ratings: Scout: Rivals: 247Sports: ESPN:				
Jeff Garrett; SF	Gadsden, AL	Oldsmar Christian High School	6 ft 7 in (2.01 m)	210 lb (95 kg)	Apr 19, 2014
Jeff Garrett; SF	Recruit ratings: Scout: Rivals: 247Sports: ESPN:				
Overall recruit ranking:
Note: In many cases, Scout, Rivals, 247Sports, On3, and ESPN may conflict in their listings of height and weight.; In these cases, the average was taken. ESPN grades are on a 100-point scale.; Sources: "Alabama Basketball Commitments". Rivals.; "2014 Alabama Basketball Commits". Scout.; "ESPN". ESPN.; "Scout.com Team Recruiting Rankings". Scout.; "2014 Team Ranking". Rivals.

== Roster ==
2014–15 Alabama Crimson Tide men's basketball team
Players
Coaches

Pos.	#	Name	Height	Weight	Year	Hometown
G/F	1	Riley Norris	6 ft 7 in (2.01 m)	190 lb (86 kg)	Fr	Albertville, Alabama
G	2	Ricky Tarrant (injured)	6 ft 2 in (1.88 m)	190 lb (86 kg)	Jr	Pleasant Grove, Alabama
F	3	Michael Kessens	6 ft 9 in (2.06 m)	215 lb (98 kg)	So	Nyon, Switzerland
F	4	Jeff Garrett (redshirt)	6 ft 7 in (2.01 m)	210 lb (95 kg)	Fr	Gadsden, Alabama
G	28	Jason Williamson (W)	5 ft 10 in (1.78 m)	175 lb (79 kg)	Fr	Chicago, Illinois
F	10	Jimmie Taylor	6 ft 10 in (2.08 m)	240 lb (109 kg)	So	Greensboro, Alabama
F	11	Shannon Hale (injured)	6 ft 8 in (2.03 m)	220 lb (100 kg)	So	Johnson City, Tennessee
G	20	Levi Randolph (C)	6 ft 5 in (1.96 m)	205 lb (93 kg)	Sr	Madison, Alabama
F	21	Rodney Cooper	6 ft 6 in (1.98 m)	215 lb (98 kg)	Sr	Hurtsboro, Alabama
G	23	Devin Mitchell	6 ft 4 in (1.93 m)	175 lb (79 kg)	Fr	Suwanee, Georgia
G	32	Retin Obasohan	6 ft 1 in (1.85 m)	210 lb (95 kg)	RS Jr	Antwerp, Belgium
F	35	Dakota Slaughter	6 ft 6 in (1.98 m)	215 lb (98 kg)	Sr	Fishers, Indiana
F	41	John Gibson (i)	6 ft 7 in (2.01 m)	215 lb (98 kg)	So	Marietta, Georgia

Head coach

- Anthony Grant (Dayton)

Assistant coach(es)

- John Brannen (Marshall)
- Antoine Pettway (Alabama)
- Reggie Witherspoon (Wheeling)

Legend

- (C) Team captain
- (S) Suspended
- (I) Ineligible
- (W) Walk-on
- Injured
- Current redshirt

Roster
Last update: April 25, 2015

== Schedule and results ==
Date time, TV	Rank^{#}	Opponent^{#}	Result	Record	High points	High rebounds	High assists	Site (attendance) city, state
Exhibition
11/10/2014*; 7:00 pm		Montevallo	W 81–67		22 – Randolph	8 – Taylor	6 – Coleman	Coleman Coliseum (9,583); Tuscaloosa, AL
Non-conference regular season
11/14/2014*; 8:00 pm		Towson; CBE Hall of Fame Classic	W 82–54	1–0	15 – Tied	10 – Randolph	5 – Randolph	Coleman Coliseum (10,345); Tuscaloosa, AL
11/17/2014*; 8:00 pm, SECN		Western Carolina; CBE Hall of Fame Classic	W 80–74	2–0	19 – Randolph	10 – Taylor	2 – Tied	Coleman Coliseum (8,830); Tuscaloosa, AL
11/20/2014*; 8:00 pm, SECN		Southern Miss	W 81–67	3–0	23 – Randolph	11 – Hale	3 – Coleman	Coleman Coliseum (9,260); Tuscaloosa, AL
11/24/2014*; 8:30 pm, ESPN2		vs. No. 13 Iowa State; CBE Hall of Fame Classic; Semifinals	L 74–84	3–1	27 – Cooper	6 – Norris	4 – Tied	Sprint Center (8,321); Kansas City, MO
11/25/2014*; 6:00 pm, ESPN3		vs. Arizona State; CBE Hall of Fame Classic; Third place game	W 76–71	4–1	28 – Randolph	9 – Blakes	4 – Justice	Sprint Center (9,034); Kansas City, MO
12/02/2014*; 8:00 pm, SECN		South Florida	W 82–71	5–1	20 – Cooper	11 – Taylor	8 – Tarrant	Coleman Coliseum (9,342); Tuscaloosa, AL
12/06/2014*; 7:00 pm, CBSSN		at Xavier	L 84–97	5–2	23 – Tarrant	5 – Kessens	4 – Tied	Cintas Center (10,250); Cincinnati, OH
12/13/2014*; 8:00 pm		Tennessee Tech	W 65–53	6–2	23 – Cooper	6 – Taylor	5 – Randolph	Coleman Coliseum (9,526); Tuscaloosa, AL
12/16/2014*; 8:00 pm, ESPN2		at No. 11 Wichita State	L 52–53	6–3	13 – Tied	5 – Tied	3 – Tarrant	Charles Koch Arena (10,506); Wichita, KS
12/19/2014*; 6:00 pm		Stillman	W 69–49	7–3	14 – Coleman	9 – Taylor	3 – Randolph	Coleman Coliseum (9,097); Tuscaloosa, AL
12/21/2014*; 5:30 pm, SECN		Appalachian State	W 60–59	8–3	17 – Kessens	10 – Kessens	5 – Randolph	Coleman Coliseum (9,515); Tuscaloosa, AL
12/28/2014*; 5:30 pm, ESPNU		UCLA	W 56–50	9–3	24 – Tarrant	7 – Taylor	2 – Tied	Coleman Coliseum (13,472); Tuscaloosa, AL
01/02/2015*; 6:00 pm		North Florida	W 76–61	10–3	18 – Kessens	12 – Kessens	6 – Tarrant	Coleman Coliseum (8,821); Tuscaloosa, AL
SEC regular season
01/06/2015; 8:00 pm, SECN		Texas A&M	W 65–44	11–3 (1–0)	15 – Tarrant	9 – Tied	3 – Randolph	Coleman Coliseum (10,264); Tuscaloosa, AL
01/10/2015; 1:00 pm, SECN		at Tennessee	W 56–38	12–3 (2–0)	17 – Cooper	5 – Tied	5 – Copper	Thompson–Boling Arena (16,695); Knoxville, TN
01/13/2015; 6:00 pm, SECN		at South Carolina	L 66–68	12–4 (2–1)	15 – Tarrant	5 – Taylor	4 – Cooper	Colonial Life Arena (11,085); South Carolina, SC
01/17/2015; 3:00 pm, ESPN		No. 1 Kentucky	L 48–70	12–5 (2–2)	15 – Randolph	4 – Tied	1 – Tied	Coleman Coliseum (15,383); Tuscaloosa, AL
01/22/2015; 6:00 pm, ESPN2		at Arkansas	L 91–93 ^{OT}	12–6 (2–3)	21 – Tarrant	8 – Randolph	3 – Hale	Bud Walton Arena (11,528); Fayetteville, AR
01/24/2015; 7:30 pm, SECN		Auburn; Iron Bowl of Basketball	W 57–55	13–6 (3–3)	18 – Randolph	7 – Tied	3 – Coleman	Coleman Coliseum (15,383); Tuscaloosa, AL
01/27/2015; 8:00 pm, ESPN		Florida	L 50–52	13–7 (3–4)	14 – Cooper	8 – Kessens	2 – Tied	Coleman Coliseum (10,759); Tuscaloosa, AL
01/31/2015; 6:00 pm, SECN		at No. 1 Kentucky	L 55–70	13–8 (3–5)	13 – Hale	5 – Kessens	3 – Tied	Rupp Arena (24,351); Lexington, KY
02/04/2015; 8:00 pm, SECN		Missouri	W 62–49	14–8 (4–5)	20 – Randolph	8 – Obasohan	2 – Kessens	Coleman Coliseum (9,343); Tuscaloosa, AL
02/07/2015; 5:00 pm, ESPN2		at LSU	L 60–71	14–9 (4–6)	17 – Randolph	12 – Norris	2 – Randolph	Maravich Center (10,355); Baton Rouge, LA
02/10/2015; 8:00 pm, SECN		at Mississippi State	W 55–51	15–9 (5–6)	14 – Hale	7 – Randolph	3 – Randolph	Humphrey Coliseum (6,386); Starkville, MS
02/14/2015; 7:00 pm, ESPNU		Vanderbilt	L 68–76	15–10 (5–7)	15 – Randolph	8 – Norris	2 – Tied	Coleman Coliseum (11,501); Tuscaloosa, AL
02/17/2015; 8:00 pm, ESPNU		at Auburn; Iron Bowl of Basketball	W 79–68	16–10 (6–7)	19 – Randolph	8 – Taylor	4 – Cooper	Auburn Arena (9,121); Auburn, AL
02/21/2015; 7:00 pm, ESPN2		Georgia	L 65–66 ^{OT}	16–11 (6–8)	16 – Obasohan	12 – Obasohan	3 – Obasohan	Coleman Coliseum (12,141); Tuscaloosa, AL
02/24/2015; 6:00 pm, SECN		South Carolina	W 59–51	17–11 (7–8)	17 – Randolph	7 – Norris	5 – Randolph	Coleman Coliseum (8,848); Tuscaloosa, AL
02/28/2015; 3:00 pm, FSN		at Vanderbilt	L 66–73	17–12 (7–9)	16 – Obasohan	10 – Norris	3 – Randolph	Memorial Gymnasium (9,928); Nashville, TN
03/03/2015; 6:00 pm, SECN		Ole Miss	L 74–82	17–13 (7–10)	32 – Randolph	11 – Taylor	3 – Taylor	Coleman Coliseum (9,184); Tuscaloosa, AL
03/07/2015; 1:00 pm, FSN		at Texas A&M	W 61–60	18–13 (8–10)	12 – Obasohan	9 – Randolph	2 – Tied	Reed Arena (9,064); College Station, TX
SEC Tournament
03/12/2015; Noon, SECN	(9)	vs. (8) Florida; Second round	L 61–69	18–14	15 – Tied	7 – Norris	4 – Randolph	Bridgestone Arena (10,563); Nashville, TN
NIT
03/17/2015*; 9:00 pm, ESPN	(6)	(3) Illinois; First round	W 79–58	19–14	20 – Randolph	7 – Tied	5 – Randolph	Coleman Coliseum (2,348); Tuscaloosa, AL
03/21/2015*; 11:00 am, ESPN	(6)	at (2) Miami (FL); Second round	L 66–73	19–15	20 – Cooper	8 – Taylor	3 – Coleman	BankUnited Center (1,979); Coral Gables, FL
*Non-conference game. Rankings from AP poll. All times are in Central Time. (#) during NIT is seed within region.

Source: 2014–15 Schedule. Rolltide.com

== See also ==
- Iron Bowl of Basketball
- 2014–15 NCAA Division I men's basketball season
- 2014–15 NCAA Division I men's basketball rankings
- 2014–15 Alabama Crimson Tide women's basketball team
