= 2014–15 Stetson Hatters men's basketball team =

American college basketball season

2014–15 Stetson Hatters men's basketball
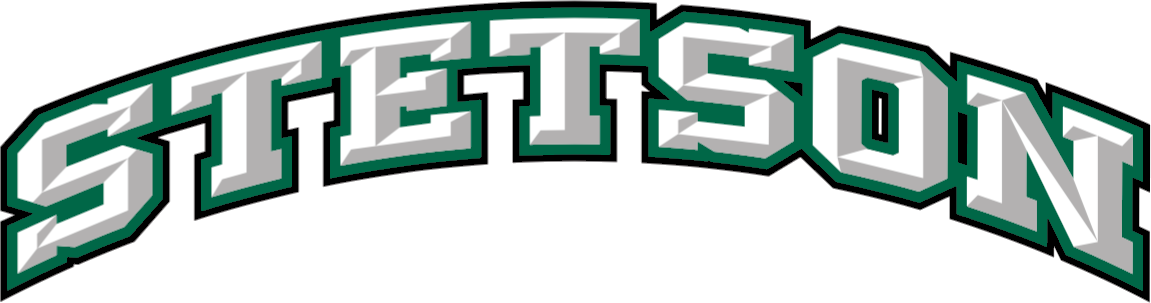
- Conference: Atlantic Sun Conference
- Record: 9–22 (3–11 A-Sun)
- Head coach: Corey Williams (2nd season)
- Assistant coaches: Mike Jaskulski; Nikita Johnson; Bert Capel
- Home arena: Edmunds Center

2014–15 Atlantic Sun men's basketball standings
	Conf.				Overall
Team	W		L	PCT	W		L	PCT
North Florida †	12	–	2	.857	23	–	12	.657
Florida Gulf Coast	11	–	3	.786	22	–	11	.667
USC Upstate	8	–	6	.571	24	–	12	.667
Lipscomb	7	–	7	.500	14	–	17	.452
Northern Kentucky*	7	–	7	.500	13	–	17	.433
Jacksonville	4	–	10	.286	10	–	22	.313
Kennesaw State	4	–	10	.286	10	–	22	.313
Stetson	3	–	11	.214	9	–	22	.290
† 2015 Atlantic Sun Tournament winner *NKU was eligible for A-Sun Tourney, but not for postseason play due to Div. I transition

The 2014–15 Stetson Hatters men's basketball team represented Stetson University during the 2014–15 NCAA Division I men's basketball season. The Hatters, led by second year head coach Corey Williams, played their home games at the Edmunds Center and were members of the Atlantic Sun Conference. They finished the season 9–22, 3–11 in A-Sun play to finish in last place. They lost in the quarterfinals of the A-Sun tournament to North Florida.

== Roster ==
Number	Name	Position	Height	Weight	Year	Hometown
2	Kentwan Smith	Forward	6–8	205	Senior	Freeport, Bahamas
3	B.J. Glasford	Guard	6–4	180	Sophomore	Miami, Florida
4	Divine Myles	Guard	5–11	180	Freshman	Mobile, Alabama
10	Grant Lozoya	Guard	6–2	180	Freshman	Westlake Village, California
11	Corey Mendez	Guard	6–4	180	Freshman	Coconut Creek, Florida
12	Jonathan Joseph	Forward	6–5	190	Freshman	Orlando, Florida
15	Angel Rivera	Guard	5–8	160	Freshman	Bayamón, Puerto Rico
20	Wyatt Sikora	Forward/Center	6–11	210	Freshman	Key Largo, Florida
23	Kevin Ndahiro	Forward/Center	6–9	225	Freshman	Ottawa, Ontario
24	Cameron Harvey	Guard	6–3	210	RS Sophomore	Naperville, Illinois
33	Luke Doyle	Guard	6–5	190	Sophomore	Oviedo, Florida
40	Kyle Sikora	Center	7–0	255	Senior	Key Largo, Florida
41	Brian Pegg	Guard	6–7	205	RS Sophomore	Clearwater, Florida

== Schedule ==
Date time, TV	Opponent	Result	Record	Site (attendance) city, state
Exhibition
11/08/2014*; 1:00 pm	Columbus State	W 66–55		Edmunds Center; DeLand, FL
Regular season
11/14/2014*; 8:00 pm	Edward Waters	W 75–61	1–0	Edmunds Center (686); DeLand, FL
11/16/2014*; 6:00 pm, ESPN3	at UCF	L 55–64	1–1	CFE Arena (4,578); Orlando, FL
11/18/2014*; 7:00 pm	FIU	L 52–53	1–2	Edmunds Center (1,032); DeLand, FL
11/20/2014*; 7:00 pm	Palm Beach Atlantic	W 96–85	2–2	Edmunds Center (850); DeLand, FL
11/24/2014*; 9:00 pm	at New Mexico State; Wyoming Tournament	L 68–88	2–3	Pan American Center (4,884); Las Cruces, NM
11/26/2014*; 9:00 pm	at Wyoming; Wyoming Tournament	L 41–65	2–4	Arena-Auditorium (4,668); Laramie, WY
11/28/2014*; 9:00 pm	at Northern Colorado; Wyoming Tournament	L 62–82	2–5	Bank of Colorado Arena (1,032); Greeley, CO
11/29/2014*; 5:00 pm	vs. Florida A&M; Wyoming Tournament	W 62–50	3–5	Bank of Colorado Arena (N/A); Greeley, CO
12/03/2014*; 7:00 pm	IPFW	L 76–87	3–6	Edmunds Center (780); DeLand, FL
12/06/2014*; 4:00 pm	at Davidson	L 59–90	3–7	John M. Belk Arena (3,132); Davidson, NC
12/16/2014*; 7:00 pm	at Florida Atlantic	L 69–79	3–8	FAU Arena (898); Boca Raton, FL
12/18/2014*; 7:00 pm	Georgia Southern	L 67–76	3–9	Edmunds Center (1,233); DeLand, FL
12/23/2014*; 1:00 pm, ESPN3	at Florida State	L 59–63	3–10	Donald L. Tucker Civic Center (4,743); Tallahassee, FL
12/30/2014*; 1:00 pm	Florida Tech	W 77–61	4–10	Edmunds Center (959); DeLand, FL
01/03/2015*; 1:00 pm, ESPN3	Florida A&M	W 65–60	5–10	Edmunds Center (923); DeLand, FL
01/10/2015; 7:00 pm, ESPN3	at Florida Gulf Coast	L 50–72	5–11 (0–1)	Alico Arena (4,633); Fort Myers, FL
01/14/2015; 7:00 pm, ESPN3	at Jacksonville	L 69–71	5–12 (0–2)	Swisher Gymnasium (897); Jacksonville, FL
01/17/2015; 1:00 pm	North Florida	L 65–80	5–13 (0–3)	Edmunds Center (1,262); DeLand, FL
01/22/2015; 7:00 pm, ESPN3	at Kennesaw State	L 82–88	5–14 (0–4)	KSU Convocation Center (1,537); Kennesaw, GA
01/24/2015; 2:00 pm, ESPN3	at USC Upstate	L 67–91	5–15 (0–5)	G. B. Hodge Center (837); Spartanburg, SC
01/29/2015; 7:00 pm, ESPN3	Northern Kentucky	W 85–75	6–15 (1–5)	Edmunds Center (823); DeLand, FL
01/31/2015; 7:00 pm, ESPN3	Lipscomb	W 75–73	7–15 (2–5)	Edmunds Center (1,027); DeLand, FL
02/03/2015*; 7:30 pm	at Bethune-Cookman	W 77–72	8–15	Moore Gymnasium (1,150); Daytona Beach, FL
02/07/2015; 3:30 pm, ESPN3	Florida Gulf Coast	L 51–67	8–16 (2–6)	Edmunds Center (2,642); DeLand, FL
02/12/2015; 7:30 pm, ESPN3	at Lipscomb	L 85–87	8–17 (2–7)	Allen Arena (1,122); Nashville, TN
02/14/2015; 7:00 pm, ESPN3	at Northern Kentucky	L 57–82	8–18 (2–8)	The Bank of Kentucky Center (1,520); Highland Heights, KY
02/19/2015; 2:00 pm, ESPN3	USC Upstate	L 54–73	8–19 (2–9)	G. B. Hodge Center (748); Spartanburg, SC
02/21/2015; 1:00 pm	Kennesaw State	L 56–61	8–20 (2–10)	Edmunds Center (656); DeLand, FL
02/25/2015; 7:00 pm	Jacksonville	W 70–67	9–20 (3–10)	Edmunds Center (807); DeLand, FL
02/28/2015; 7:00 pm, ESPN3	at North Florida	L 71–86	9–21 (3–11)	UNF Arena (3,793); Jacksonville, FL
Atlantic Sun tournament
03/03/2015; 7:30 pm, ESPN3	at North Florida; Quarterfinals	L 67–81	9–22	UNF Arena (3,313); Jacksonville, FL
*Non-conference game. ^{#}Rankings from AP Poll. (#) Tournament seedings in parentheses. All times are in Eastern Time.
