= 2014–15 Mississippi State Bulldogs basketball team =

American college basketball season

2014–15 Mississippi State Bulldogs men's basketball
- Conference: Southeastern Conference
- Record: 13–19 (6–12 SEC)
- Head coach: Rick Ray (3rd season)
- Assistant coaches: George Brooks; Wes Flanigan; Chris Hollender
- Home arena: Humphrey Coliseum

2014–15 Southeastern Conference men's basketball standings
	Conf.				Overall
Team	W		L	PCT	W		L	PCT
No. 1 Kentucky †	18	–	0	1.000	38	–	1	.974
No. 21 Arkansas	13	–	5	.722	27	–	9	.750
LSU	11	–	7	.611	22	–	11	.667
Georgia	11	–	7	.611	21	–	12	.636
Texas A&M	11	–	7	.611	21	–	12	.636
Ole Miss	11	–	7	.611	21	–	13	.618
Vanderbilt	9	–	9	.500	21	–	14	.600
Alabama	8	–	10	.444	19	–	15	.559
Florida	8	–	10	.444	16	–	17	.485
Tennessee	7	–	11	.389	16	–	16	.500
South Carolina	6	–	12	.333	17	–	16	.515
Mississippi State	6	–	12	.333	13	–	19	.406
Auburn	4	–	14	.222	15	–	20	.429
Missouri	3	–	15	.167	9	–	23	.281
† 2015 SEC tournament winner Rankings from AP poll

The 2014–15 Mississippi State Bulldogs basketball team represented Mississippi State University in the 2014–15 NCAA Division I men's basketball season. The team's head coach was Rick Ray, in his third season at Mississippi State. The team played their home games at the Humphrey Coliseum in Starkville, Mississippi as a member of the Southeastern Conference. They finished the season 13–19, 6–12 in SEC play to finish in a tie for 11th place. They lost in the first round of the SEC tournament to Auburn.

On March 21, head coach Rick Ray was fired. He had a three-year record of 37–60.

== Before the season ==
=== Departures ===
The Bulldogs lost eight players from the 2013–14 team.

Name	Number	Pos.	Height	Weight	Year	Hometown	Notes
Colin Borchert	3	F	6'8"	231	Senior	Phoenix, AZ	Graduated
Andre Applewhite	2	G	6'5"	217	RS Freshman	Memphis, TN	Transferred to Toledo during 2013–14 season
Jacoby Davis	11	G	6'1"	191	RS Freshman	Charlotte, NC	Transferred
De'Runnya Wilson	12	F	6'5"	215	Freshman	Birmingham, AL	Concentrating on football
Dallas Prater	10	G	6'3"	170	Freshman	Jackson, MS	Left team (Walk-on)
Tevin Moore	13	G	6'3"	185	Junior	Olive Branch, MS	Left team (Walk-on)
Tyson Cunningham	24	G	6'3"	197	RS Senior	Columbus, MS	Graduated (Walk-on)
Kyle Dobbs	33	G	6'6"	160	Freshman	Grayson, GA	Left team (Walk-on)

=== Recruits ===
College recruiting information
Name	Hometown	School	Height	Weight	Commit date
Demetrius Houston; SF	Montgomery, AL	Carver	6 ft 6 in (1.98 m)	185 lb (84 kg)	Jul 8, 2013
Demetrius Houston; SF	Recruit ratings: Scout: Rivals: 247Sports: ESPN:				
Oliver Black; PF	Jackson, MS	Wingfield	6 ft 9 in (2.06 m)	215 lb (98 kg)	Jul 2, 2013
Oliver Black; PF	Recruit ratings: Scout: Rivals: 247Sports: ESPN:				
Elijah Staley; SF	Marietta, GA	Wheeler	6 ft 6 in (1.98 m)	208 lb (94 kg)	Jun 15, 2013
Elijah Staley; SF	Recruit ratings: Scout: Rivals: 247Sports: ESPN:				
Maurice Dunlap; SG	Greenwood, MS	Amanda Elzy	6 ft 2 in (1.88 m)	170 lb (77 kg)	Jun 27, 2012
Maurice Dunlap; SG	Recruit ratings: Scout: Rivals: 247Sports: ESPN:				
Johnny Zuppardo; PF	Bay St. Louis, MS	Jones County JC	6 ft 9 in (2.06 m)	235 lb (107 kg)	Apr 15, 2014
Johnny Zuppardo; PF	Recruit ratings: Scout: Rivals: 247Sports: ESPN:				
Overall recruit ranking: Scout: Not Ranked Rivals: Not Ranked ESPN: Not Ranked
Note: In many cases, Scout, Rivals, 247Sports, On3, and ESPN may conflict in their listings of height and weight.; In these cases, the average was taken. ESPN grades are on a 100-point scale.; Sources: "Mississippi State 2014 Basketball Commitments". Rivals.; "2014 Mississippi State Basketball Commits". Scout.; "ESPN". ESPN.; "Scout.com Team Recruiting Rankings". Scout.; "2014 Team Ranking". Rivals.

The Bulldogs also added two walk-ons, Isaiah Butler and Jeffery Johnson, who will be classified as seniors for the season.

== Roster ==
2014–15 Mississippi State Bulldogs men's basketball team
Players
Coaches

Pos.	#	Name	Height	Weight	Year	Previous school	Hometown
G	0	Maurice Dunlap (injured) (redshirt)	6 ft 2 in (1.88 m)	170 lb (77 kg)	Fr	Amanda Elzy	Greenville, MS
G	1	Fred Thomas	6 ft 5 in (1.96 m)	206 lb (93 kg)	Jr	Jim Hill HS	Jackson, MS
F	2	Demetrius Houston	6 ft 7 in (2.01 m)	205 lb (93 kg)	Fr	G. W. Carver HS	Montgomery, AL
G	3	Trivante Bloodman	6 ft 0 in (1.83 m)	198 lb (90 kg)	Sr	Olney Central College	Bronx, NY
F	4	Johnny Zuppardo	6 ft 9 in (2.06 m)	235 lb (107 kg)	Jr	Jones County JC	Bay St. Louis, MS
G	5	Isaiah Butler (W)	6 ft 2 in (1.88 m)	214 lb (97 kg)	Sr	Brandon HS	Brandon, MS
G	10	Jeffery Johnson (W)	6 ft 2 in (1.88 m)	172 lb (78 kg)	Sr	Germantown HS	Memphis, TN
G	14	Elijah Staley (injured) (redshirt)	6 ft 6 in (1.98 m)	220 lb (100 kg)	Fr	Wheeler	Marietta, GA
G	15	I.J. Ready	5 ft 11 in (1.8 m)	170 lb (77 kg)	So	Parkview Magnet HS	Little Rock, AR
F	20	Gavin Ware	6 ft 9 in (2.06 m)	260 lb (118 kg)	Jr	Starkville HS	Starkville, MS
C	22	Fallou Ndoye	6 ft 11 in (2.11 m)	220 lb (100 kg)	RS Fr	Findlay Prep	Senegal
F	23	Travis Daniels	6 ft 8 in (2.03 m)	215 lb (98 kg)	RS Jr	Shelton State CC	Russellville, AL
F	25	Roquez Johnson	6 ft 7 in (2.01 m)	210 lb (95 kg)	Sr	G. W. Carver HS	Montgomery, AL
G	32	Craig Sword	6 ft 3 in (1.91 m)	194 lb (88 kg)	Jr	G. W. Carver HS	Montgomery, AL
F	33	Oliver Black	6 ft 9 in (2.06 m)	215 lb (98 kg)	Fr	Wingfield	Jackson, MS

Head coach

- Rick Ray (Grand View)

Assistant coach(es)

- George Brooks (Mississippi State)
- Wes Flanigan (Auburn)
- Chris Hollender (Evansville)

Legend

- (C) Team captain
- (S) Suspended
- (I) Ineligible
- (W) Walk-on
- Injured
- Current redshirt

Roster

== Schedule and results ==
Date time, TV	Opponent	Result	Record	Site (attendance) city, state
Exhibition
11/06/2014*; 7:00 pm	Delta State	W 72–51	–	Humphrey Coliseum; Starkville, MS
Non-Conference games
11/14/2014*; 5:30 pm	Western Carolina	W 66–56	1–0	Humphrey Coliseum (6,261); Starkville, MS
11/17/2014*; 7:00 pm	Mississippi Valley State	W 89–68	2–0	Humphrey Coliseum (6,065); Starkville, MS
11/22/2014*; 2:00 pm	Utah State	W 71–63	3–0	Humphrey Coliseum (7,240); Starkville, MS
11/24/2014*; 7:00 pm	Clayton State	W 59–46	4–0	Humphrey Coliseum (6,030); Starkville, MS
11/28/2014*; 8:30 pm, CBSSN	vs. Saint Louis; Corpus Christi Coastal Classic	W 75–50	5–0	American Bank Center (2,867); Corpus Christi, TX
11/29/2014*; 5:30 pm, CBSSN	vs. TCU; Corpus Christi Coastal Classic	L 52–61	5–1	American Bank Center (2,867); Corpus Christi, TX
12/06/2014*; 1:00 pm, ESPN3	at Tulane	L 54–59	5–2	Devlin Fieldhouse (1,483); New Orleans, LA
12/13/2014*; 3:00 pm, P12N	at Oregon State	L 49–59	5–3	Gill Coliseum (4,211); Corvallis, OR
12/17/2014*; 6:00 pm, SECN	Arkansas State	L 55–69	5–4	Humphrey Coliseum (5,390); Starkville, MS
12/20/2014*; 3:00 pm	vs. USC Upstate; Jackson Showcase	L 51–53	5–5	Mississippi Coliseum (1,102); Jackson, MS
12/23/2014*; 7:00 pm	Jacksonville	W 70–47	6–5	Humphrey Coliseum (5,366); Starkville, MS
12/30/2014*; 7:00 pm	McNeese State	L 47–66	6–6	Humphrey Coliseum (5,155); Starkville, MS
01/02/2015*; 7:00 pm, ESPNU	Florida State	W 62–55	7–6	Humphrey Coliseum (5,756); Starkville, MS
Conference games
01/07/2015; 8:00 pm, SECN	Tennessee	L 47–61	7–7 (0–1)	Humphrey Coliseum (5,704); Starkville, MS
01/10/2015; 6:00 pm, FSN	at Florida	L 47–72	7–8 (0–2)	O'Connell Center (11,966); Gainesville, FL
01/13/2015; 8:00 pm, SECN	at Texas A&M	L 70–74	7–9 (0–3)	Reed Arena (4,804); College Station, TX
01/17/2015; 3:00 pm, FSN	Vanderbilt	W 57–54	8–9 (1–3)	Humphrey Coliseum (6,568); Starkville, MS
01/21/2015; 8:00 pm, SECN	at Auburn	W 78–71	9–9 (2–3)	Auburn Arena (8,083); Auburn, AL
01/24/2015; 2:00 pm, FSN	Georgia	L 66–72	9–10 (2–4)	Humphrey Coliseum (7,549); Starkville, MS
01/28/2015; 8:00 pm, SECN	at Ole Miss	L 73–79	9–11 (2–5)	Tad Smith Coliseum (8,959); Oxford, MS
01/31/2015; 1:00 pm, SECN	LSU	W 73–67	10–11 (3–5)	Humphrey Coliseum (6,657); Starkville, MS
02/03/2015; 6:00 pm, SECN	at Tennessee	W 71–66	11–11 (4–5)	Thompson–Boling Arena (13,268); Knoxville, TN
02/07/2015; 3:00 pm, SECN	at Arkansas	L 41–61	11–12 (4–6)	Bud Walton Arena (17,404); Fayetteville, AR
02/10/2015; 8:00 pm, SECN	Alabama	L 51–55	11–13 (4–7)	Humphrey Coliseum (6,386); Starkville, MS
02/14/2015; 3:00 pm, ESPNU	at Missouri	W 77–74	12–13 (5–7)	Mizzou Arena (8,278); Columbia, MO
02/19/2015; 8:00 pm, ESPN2	Ole Miss	L 65–71	12–14 (5–8)	Humphrey Coliseum (7,873); Starkville, MS
02/21/2015; 3:00 pm, FSN	No. 18 Arkansas	L 61–65	12–15 (5–9)	Humphrey Coliseum (6,254); Starkville, MS
02/25/2015; 6:00 pm, SECN	No. 1 Kentucky	L 56–74	12–16 (5–10)	Humphrey Coliseum (6,795); Starkville, MS
02/28/2015; 5:00 pm, SECN	at South Carolina	L 68–81	12–17 (5–11)	Colonial Life Arena (14,022); Columbia, SC
03/04/2015; 8:00 pm, SECN	at Vanderbilt	L 56–66	12–18 (5–12)	Memorial Gymnasium (8,685); Nashville, TN
03/07/2015; 5:30 pm, SECN	Missouri	W 52–43	13–18 (6–12)	Humphrey Coliseum (5,897); Starkville, MS
SEC tournament
03/11/2015; 6:00 pm, SECN	vs. Auburn; SEC tournament first round	L 68–74	13–19	Bridgestone Arena (10,039); Nashville, TN
*Non-conference game. ^{#}Rankings from AP Poll. (#) Tournament seedings in parentheses. All times are in Central Time.

== See also ==
2014–15 Mississippi State Lady Bulldogs basketball team
