= 2014–15 South Carolina Gamecocks men's basketball team =

American college basketball season

2014–15 South Carolina Gamecocks men's basketball
- Conference: Southeastern Conference
- Record: 17–16 (6–12 SEC)
- Head coach: Frank Martin (3rd season)
- Assistant coaches: Matt Figger; Perry Clark; Lamont Evans
- Home arena: Colonial Life Arena

2014–15 Southeastern Conference men's basketball standings
	Conf.				Overall
Team	W		L	PCT	W		L	PCT
No. 1 Kentucky †	18	–	0	1.000	38	–	1	.974
No. 21 Arkansas	13	–	5	.722	27	–	9	.750
LSU	11	–	7	.611	22	–	11	.667
Georgia	11	–	7	.611	21	–	12	.636
Texas A&M	11	–	7	.611	21	–	12	.636
Ole Miss	11	–	7	.611	21	–	13	.618
Vanderbilt	9	–	9	.500	21	–	14	.600
Alabama	8	–	10	.444	19	–	15	.559
Florida	8	–	10	.444	16	–	17	.485
Tennessee	7	–	11	.389	16	–	16	.500
South Carolina	6	–	12	.333	17	–	16	.515
Mississippi State	6	–	12	.333	13	–	19	.406
Auburn	4	–	14	.222	15	–	20	.429
Missouri	3	–	15	.167	9	–	23	.281
† 2015 SEC tournament winner Rankings from AP poll

The 2014–15 South Carolina Gamecocks men's basketball team represented the University of South Carolina during the 2014–15 NCAA Division I men's basketball season. The team's head coach was Frank Martin, who was in his third season at South Carolina. The team played their home games at the Colonial Life Arena in Columbia, South Carolina as a member of the Southeastern Conference. They finished the season 17–16, 6–12 in SEC play to finish in a tie for 11th place. They advanced to the quarterfinals of the SEC tournament where they lost to Georgia.

== Before the season ==
=== Departures ===
Name	Number	Pos.	Height	Weight	Year	Hometown	Notes
Brenton Williams	1	G	5'11"	172	Senior	Kissimmee, FL	Graduated
Jaylen Shaw	5	G	6'0"	182	Freshman	Hartsville, SC	Transferred to Coastal Carolina
Bruce Ellington	23	G	5'9"	196	Senior	Moncks Corner, SC	Graduated
Desmond Ringer	32	F/C	6'9"	255	Freshman	McDonough, GA	Transferred to Mercer
Carlton Geathers	45	F	6'10"	255	RS Junior	Georgetown, SC	Injured

=== Recruits ===
College recruiting information
Name	Hometown	School	Height	Weight	Commit date
Marcus Stroman; PG	Columbia, SC	Keenan	6 ft 2 in (1.88 m)	170 lb (77 kg)	Jul 2, 2012
Marcus Stroman; PG	Recruit ratings: Scout: Rivals: 247Sports: ESPN:				
TeMarcus Blanton; SG	Locust Grove, GA	Luella	6 ft 4 in (1.93 m)	185 lb (84 kg)	Sep 1, 2013
TeMarcus Blanton; SG	Recruit ratings: Scout: Rivals: 247Sports: ESPN:				
James Thompson; C	Baton Rouge, LA	Parkview Baptist	6 ft 9 in (2.06 m)	215 lb (98 kg)	May 28, 2014
James Thompson; C	Recruit ratings: Scout: Rivals: 247Sports: ESPN:				
Shamiek Sheppard; SF	Brooklyn, NY	Fishburne Military School	6 ft 6 in (1.98 m)	225 lb (102 kg)	Mar 10, 2014
Shamiek Sheppard; SF	Recruit ratings: Scout: Rivals: 247Sports: ESPN:				
Overall recruit ranking: Scout: 28 Rivals: 23 ESPN: 23
Note: In many cases, Scout, Rivals, 247Sports, On3, and ESPN may conflict in their listings of height and weight.; In these cases, the average was taken. ESPN grades are on a 100-point scale.; Sources: "South Carolina 2014 Basketball Commitments". Rivals.; "2014 South Carolina Basketball Commits". Scout.; "ESPN". ESPN.; "Scout.com Team Recruiting Rankings". Scout.; "2014 Team Ranking". Rivals.

== Roster ==
2014–15 South Carolina Gamecocks men's basketball team
Players
Coaches

Pos.	#	Name	Height	Weight	Year	Previous school	Hometown
G	0	Sindarius Thornwell	6 ft 5 in (1.96 m)	215 lb (98 kg)	So	Oak Hill Academy	Lancaster, SC
G	1	Marcus Stroman	6 ft 2 in (1.88 m)	185 lb (84 kg)	Fr	Keenan	Columbia, SC
G	4	Tyrone Johnson	6 ft 3 in (1.91 m)	196 lb (89 kg)	Sr	Montrose Christian School; Villanova	Plainfield, NJ
G	5	TeMarcus Blanton	6 ft 5 in (1.96 m)	208 lb (94 kg)	Fr	Luella	Locust Grove, GA
G	10	Duane Notice	6 ft 2 in (1.88 m)	216 lb (98 kg)	So	St. Thomas More School	Woodbridge, ON
G/F	12	Shamiek Sheppard	6 ft 6 in (1.98 m)	215 lb (98 kg)	Fr	Fishburne Military School	Brooklyn, NY
F	14	Laimonas Chatkevicius	6 ft 11 in (2.11 m)	250 lb (113 kg)	Jr	South Kent School	Klaipėda, Lithuania
F	15	Reggie Thues, Jr.	6 ft 6 in (1.98 m)	218 lb (99 kg)	So	Fairfax HS	Los Angeles, CA
G	20	Justin McKie	6 ft 4 in (1.93 m)	196 lb (89 kg)	So	Irmo HS	Columbia, SC
F/C	21	Demetrius Henry	6 ft 9 in (2.06 m)	227 lb (103 kg)	So	Faith Baptist Christian	Miami, FL
F	24	Michael Carrera	6 ft 5 in (1.96 m)	212 lb (96 kg)	Jr	Montrose Christian School	Anzoátegui, Venezuela
F	25	Mindaugas Kacinas	6 ft 7 in (2.01 m)	228 lb (103 kg)	Jr	Word of Life School	Klaipėda, Lithuania
G	31	Austin Constable	5 ft 11 in (1.8 m)	180 lb (82 kg)	Jr	Henderson HS	West Chester, PA
F	35	Brian Steele	6 ft 5 in (1.96 m)	197 lb (89 kg)	Jr	Wade Hampton HS	Greenville, SC

Head coach

- Frank Martin (FIU)

Assistant coach(es)

- Matt Figger (Eastern Kentucky)
- Perry Clark (Gettysburg)
- Lamont Evans (Kansas State)

Legend

- (C) Team captain
- (S) Suspended
- (I) Ineligible
- (W) Walk-on
- Injured
- Current redshirt

Roster

== Schedule and results ==
Date time, TV	Opponent	Result	Record	Site (attendance) city, state
Exhibition
10/26/2014*; 4:00 pm	Benedict	W 92–47		Colonial Life Arena (10,011); Columbia, SC
Non-conference games
11/14/2014*; 7:00 pm	North Florida	W 81–56	1–0	Colonial Life Arena (10,473); Columbia, SC
11/18/2014*; 12:00 pm, ESPN	Baylor; ESPN College Hoops Tip-Off Marathon	L 65–69	1–1	Colonial Life Arena (13,291); Columbia, SC
11/20/2014*; 7:30 pm, ESPN3	vs. Cornell; Charleston Classic Quarterfinals	W 69–45	2–1	TD Arena (2,517); Charleston, SC
11/21/2014*; 7:00 pm, ESPNU	vs. Charlotte; Charleston Classic Semifinals	L 63–65	2–2	TD Arena (2,430); Charleston, SC
11/23/2014*; 6:30 pm, ESPNU	vs. Akron; Charleston Classic 3rd Place Game	L 63–68	2–3	TD Arena (1,523); Charleston, SC
11/26/2014*; 8:00 pm, SECN	UNC Asheville	W 89–75	3–3	Colonial Life Arena (8,330); Columbia, SC
12/01/2014*; 7:30 pm, CBSSN	at Marshall	W 77–59	4–3	Cam Henderson Center (5,013); Huntington, WV
12/06/2014*; 12:00 pm, ESPNU	Oklahoma State; Big 12/SEC Challenge	W 75–49	5–3	Colonial Life Arena (12,007); Columbia, SC
12/19/2014*; 7:00 pm, SECN	Clemson; Battle of the Palmetto State	W 68–45	6–3	Colonial Life Arena (11,992); Columbia, SC
12/21/2014*; 3:30 pm	Coker	W 68–45	7–3	Colonial Life Arena (8,419); Columbia, SC
12/30/2014*; 7:00 pm	North Carolina A&T	W 91–54	8–3	Colonial Life Arena (8,156); Columbia, SC
01/03/2015*; 6:00 pm, CBSSN	vs. No. 9 Iowa State; Brooklyn Hoops Showcase	W 64–60	9–3	Barclays Center (3,546); Brooklyn, NY
Conference games
01/07/2015; 7:00 pm, SECN	Florida	L 68–72	9–4 (0–1)	Colonial Life Arena (12,181); Columbia, SC
01/10/2015; 5:00 pm, FSN	at Ole Miss	L 49–65	9–5 (0–2)	Tad Smith Coliseum (6,714); Oxford, MS
01/13/2015; 7:00 pm, SECN	Alabama	W 68–66	10–5 (1–2)	Colonial Life Arena (11,085); Columbia, SC
01/17/2015; 8:30 pm, SECN	at Auburn	L 68–71	10–6 (1–3)	Auburn Arena (9,121); Auburn, AL
01/20/2015; 9:00 pm, ESPNU	Tennessee	L 62–66	10–7 (1–4)	Colonial Life Arena (12,032); Columbia, SC
01/24/2015; 12:00 pm, ESPN	No. 1 Kentucky	L 43–58	10–8 (1–5)	Colonial Life Arena (18,000); Columbia, SC
01/28/2015; 7:00 pm, SECN	at LSU	L 58–64	10–9 (1–6)	Maravich Center (9,518); Baton Rouge, LA
01/31/2015; 4:00 pm, ESPNU	Georgia	W 67–50	11–9 (2–6)	Colonial Life Arena (13,031); Columbia, SC
02/03/2015; 9:00 pm, SECN	at Arkansas	L 55–75	11–10 (2–7)	Bud Walton Arena (10,019); Fayetteville, AR
02/07/2015; 4:00 pm, FSN	at Vanderbilt	L 50–65	11–11 (2–8)	Memorial Gymnasium (9,259); Nashville, TN
02/10/2015; 7:00 pm, SECN	Missouri	W 65–60	12–11 (3–8)	Colonial Life Arena (8,840); Columbia, SC
02/14/2015; 2:00 pm, ESPN	at No. 1 Kentucky	L 43–77	12–12 (3–9)	Rupp Arena (24,305); Lexington, KY
02/17/2015; 7:00 pm, SECN	at Georgia	W 64–58	13–12 (4–9)	Stegeman Coliseum (6,263); Athens, GA
02/21/2015; 12:00 pm, SECN	Texas A&M	L 52–62	13–13 (4–10)	Colonial Life Arena (12,390); Columbia, SC
02/24/2015; 7:00 pm, SECN	at Alabama	L 51–59	13–14 (4–11)	Coleman Coliseum (8,848); Tuscaloosa, AL
02/28/2015; 6:00 pm, SECN	Mississippi State	W 81–68	14–14 (5–11)	Colonial Life Arena (14,022); Columbia, SC
03/05/2015; 7:00 pm, ESPN2	No. 18 Arkansas	L 74–78	14–15 (5–12)	Colonial Life Arena (10,065); Columbia, SC
03/07/2015; 4:00 pm, FSN	at Tennessee	W 60–49	15–15 (6–12)	Thompson–Boling Arena (16,042); Knoxville, TN
SEC tournament
03/11/2015; 9:30 pm, SECN	vs. Missouri; First round	W 63–54	16–15	Bridgestone Arena (10,039); Nashville, TN
03/12/2015; 9:30 pm, SECN	vs. Ole Miss; Second round	W 60–58	17–15	Bridgestone Arena (15,032); Nashville, TN
03/13/2015; 9:30 pm, SECN	vs. Georgia; Quarterfinals	L 62–74	17–16	Bridgestone Arena (13,135); Nashville, TN
*Non-conference game. ^{#}Rankings from AP Poll. (#) Tournament seedings in parentheses. All times are in Eastern Time.

== See also ==
- 2014–15 South Carolina Gamecocks women's basketball team
