= 2014–15 Georgia Bulldogs basketball team =

American college basketball season

2014–15 Georgia Bulldogs men's basketball

NCAA tournament, round of 64
- Conference: Southeastern Conference
- Record: 21–12 (11–7 SEC)
- Head coach: Mark Fox (6th season)
- Assistant coaches: Philip Pearson; Jonas Hayes; Yasir Rosemond
- Home arena: Stegeman Coliseum

2014–15 Southeastern Conference men's basketball standings
	Conf.				Overall
Team	W		L	PCT	W		L	PCT
No. 1 Kentucky †	18	–	0	1.000	38	–	1	.974
No. 21 Arkansas	13	–	5	.722	27	–	9	.750
LSU	11	–	7	.611	22	–	11	.667
Georgia	11	–	7	.611	21	–	12	.636
Texas A&M	11	–	7	.611	21	–	12	.636
Ole Miss	11	–	7	.611	21	–	13	.618
Vanderbilt	9	–	9	.500	21	–	14	.600
Alabama	8	–	10	.444	19	–	15	.559
Florida	8	–	10	.444	16	–	17	.485
Tennessee	7	–	11	.389	16	–	16	.500
South Carolina	6	–	12	.333	17	–	16	.515
Mississippi State	6	–	12	.333	13	–	19	.406
Auburn	4	–	14	.222	15	–	20	.429
Missouri	3	–	15	.167	9	–	23	.281
† 2015 SEC tournament winner Rankings from AP poll

The 2014–15 Georgia Bulldogs basketball team represented the University of Georgia during the 2014–15 NCAA Division I men's basketball season. The team's head coach was Mark Fox, who was in his sixth season at UGA. They played their home games at Stegeman Coliseum and were members of the Southeastern Conference. Georgia Bulldogs finished the season 21–12, 11–7 in SEC play to finish in a four-way tie for third place. They advanced to the semifinals of the SEC tournament where they lost to Arkansas. The team received an at-large bid to the NCAA tournament where they lost in the second round to Michigan State.

== Before the season ==
=== Departures ===
Name	Number	Pos.	Height	Weight	Year	Hometown	Notes
Tim Dixon	5	F/C	6'10"	230	Junior	Columbus, GA	Transferred to Columbus State
Donte' Williams	15	F	6'9"	225	Senior	Ellenwood, GA	Graduated
Brandon Morris	31	F	6'7"	215	Sophomore	Lithonia, GA	Dismissed from the team
John Cannon	41	C	6'10"	240	Junior	Burnsvile, NC	Transferred to UNC Asheville

=== Recruits Class of 2014 ===
College recruiting information
Name	Hometown	School	Height	Weight	Commit date
Yante Maten; PF	Bloomfield Hills, MI	Bloomfield Hills High School	6 ft 8 in (2.03 m)	230 lb (100 kg)	Apr 5, 2014
Yante Maten; PF	Recruit ratings: Scout: Rivals: 247Sports: ESPN:				
Fred Iduwe; C	Delafield, WI	St. John's Northwestern Military Academy	6 ft 11 in (2.11 m)	220 lb (100 kg)	Apr 6, 2014
Fred Iduwe; C	Recruit ratings: Scout: Rivals: 247Sports: ESPN:				
Overall recruit ranking: Scout: Not Ranked Rivals: Not Ranked ESPN: Not Ranked
Note: In many cases, Scout, Rivals, 247Sports, On3, and ESPN may conflict in their listings of height and weight.; In these cases, the average was taken. ESPN grades are on a 100-point scale.; Sources: "Georgia 2014 Basketball Commitments". Rivals.; "2014 Georgia Basketball Commits". Scout.; "ESPN". ESPN.; "Scout.com Team Recruiting Rankings". Scout.; "2014 Team Ranking". Rivals.

=== Recruits Class of 2015 ===
College recruiting information
Name	Hometown	School	Height	Weight	Commit date
Will Jackson; PG	Athens, GA	Athens Christian School	6 ft 3 in (1.91 m)	180 lb (82 kg)	Jul 7, 2014
Will Jackson; PG	Recruit ratings: Scout: Rivals: 247Sports: ESPN:				
Overall recruit ranking: Scout: Not Ranked Rivals: Not Ranked ESPN: Not Ranked
Note: In many cases, Scout, Rivals, 247Sports, On3, and ESPN may conflict in their listings of height and weight.; In these cases, the average was taken. ESPN grades are on a 100-point scale.; Sources: "Georgia 2015 Basketball Commitments". Rivals.; "2015 Georgia Basketball Commits". Scout.; "ESPN". ESPN.; "Scout.com Team Recruiting Rankings". Scout.; "2015 Team Ranking". Rivals.

== Roster ==
2014–15 Georgia Bulldogs men's basketball team
Players
Coaches

Pos.	#	Name	Height	Weight	Year	Previous school	Hometown
F/C	1	Yante Maten	6 ft 8 in (2.03 m)	240 lb (109 kg)	Fr	Bloomfield Hills HS	Bloomfield Hills, MI
F	2	Marcus Thornton	6 ft 8 in (2.03 m)	235 lb (107 kg)	RS Sr	Westlake HS	Atlanta, GA
G	3	Juwan Parker	6 ft 4 in (1.93 m)	200 lb (91 kg)	So	Washington HS	Tulsa, OK
G	4	Charles Mann	6 ft 5 in (1.96 m)	215 lb (98 kg)	Jr	Milton HS	Alpharetta, GA
G	10	Taylor Echols	6 ft 1 in (1.85 m)	175 lb (79 kg)	Sr	Eagle's Landing Christian	McDonough, GA
F	11	Cameron Forte	6 ft 7 in (2.01 m)	220 lb (100 kg)	Jr	McClintock HS; Howard College	Tempe, AZ
G	12	Kenny Gaines	6 ft 3 in (1.91 m)	200 lb (91 kg)	Jr	Whitefield Academy	Atlanta, GA
G	14	Brandon Young	5 ft 10 in (1.78 m)	160 lb (73 kg)	So	Marist HS	Atlanta, GA
C	15	Osahen Iduwe	6 ft 10 in (2.08 m)	235 lb (107 kg)	Fr	St. Johns NW Military	Benin City, Nigeria
G	20	Dusan Langura	6 ft 4 in (1.93 m)	205 lb (93 kg)	So	Furtah Preparatory School	Romont, Switzerland
F	24	Houston Kessler	6 ft 8 in (2.03 m)	225 lb (102 kg)	RS So	Landmark Christian	Newnan, GA
F	25	Kenny Paul Geno	6 ft 6 in (1.98 m)	200 lb (91 kg)	So	Booneville HS	Booneville, MS
G	30	J. J. Frazier	5 ft 10 in (1.78 m)	150 lb (68 kg)	So	Faith Baptist Christian	Glennville, GA
F	42	Nemanja Djurisic	6 ft 8 in (2.03 m)	230 lb (104 kg)	Sr	South Kent School	Podgorica, Montenegro

Head coach

- Mark Fox (Eastern New Mexico)

Assistant coach(es)

- Philip Pearson (Alabama)
- Jonas Hayes (Georgia)
- Yasir Rosemond (Oregon)

Legend

- (C) Team captain
- (S) Suspended
- (I) Ineligible
- (W) Walk-on
- Injured
- Current redshirt

Roster

== Schedule and results ==
Date time, TV	Rank^{#}	Opponent^{#}	Result	Record	Site (attendance) city, state
Exhibition
11/06/2014*; 7:00 pm		Georgia Southwestern	W 65–61		Stegeman Coliseum (2,058); Athens, GA
Non-conference games
11/14/2014*; 7:00 pm, ESPN3		at Georgia Tech	L 73–80	0–1	McCamish Pavilion (8,127); Atlanta, GA
11/18/2014*; 7:00 pm, SECN		Stony Brook; NIT Season Tip-Off	W 80–70	1–1	Stegeman Coliseum (4,787); Athens, GA
11/21/2014*; 7:00 pm		Troy	W 82–60	2–1	Stegeman Coliseum (5,127); Athens, GA
11/23/2014*; 5:00 pm, FSN		Florida Atlantic	W 74–61	3–1	Stegeman Coliseum (4,735); Athens, GA
11/26/2014*; 9:30 pm, ESPN2		vs. No. 10 Gonzaga; NIT Season Tip-Off Semifinals	L 76–88	3–2	Madison Square Garden (5,128); New York City, NY
11/28/2014*; 4:30 pm, ESPNU		vs. Minnesota; NIT Season Tip-Off Consolation	L 62–66	3–3	Madison Square Garden (5,548); New York City, NY
12/02/2014*; 7:00 pm, ESPN3		at Chattanooga	W 86–55	4–3	McKenzie Arena (3,784); Chattanooga, TN
12/07/2014*; Noon, SECN		Colorado	W 64–57	5–3	Stegeman Coliseum (5,687); Athens, GA
12/21/2014*; 6:00 pm, ESPNU		Seton Hall	W 65–47	6–3	Stegeman Coliseum (7,556); Athens, GA
12/27/2014*; 6:00 pm, SECN		Mercer	W 86–77 ^{3OT}	7–3	Stegeman Coliseum (8,047); Athens, GA
12/31/2014*; 4:00 pm, ESPNU		at Kansas State	W 50–46	8–3	Bramlage Coliseum (12,528); Manhattan, KS
01/03/2015*; 2:00 pm, FSN		Norfolk State	W 63–50	9–3	Stegeman Coliseum (6,273); Athens, GA
Conference games
01/06/2015; 7:00 pm, ESPN		No. 23 Arkansas	L 75–79	9–4 (0–1)	Stegeman Coliseum (7,937); Athens, GA
01/10/2015; 9:00 pm, ESPNU		at LSU	L 84–87 ^{OT}	9–5 (0–2)	Pete Maravich Assembly Center (9,217); Baton Rouge, LA
01/14/2015; 9:00 pm, SECN		at Vanderbilt	W 70–67	10–5 (1–2)	Memorial Gymnasium (9,203); Nashville, TN
01/17/2015; 2:00 pm, CBS		Florida	W 73–61	11–5 (2–2)	Stegeman Coliseum (10,523); Athens, GA
01/20/2015; 7:00 pm, SECN		Ole Miss	W 69–64	12–5 (3–2)	Stegeman Coliseum (6,079); Athens, GA
01/24/2015; 3:00 pm, FSN		at Mississippi State	W 72–66	13–5 (4–2)	Humphrey Coliseum (7,549); Starkville, MS
01/27/2015; 7:00 pm, SECN		Vanderbilt	W 70–62	14–5 (5–2)	Stegeman Coliseum (7,091); Athens, GA
01/31/2015; 4:00 pm, ESPNU		at South Carolina	L 50–67	14–6 (5–3)	Colonial Life Arena (13,031); Columbia, SC
02/03/2015; 7:00 pm, ESPNU		at No. 1 Kentucky	L 58–69	14–7 (5–4)	Rupp Arena (24,256); Lexington, KY
02/07/2015; Noon, ESPN2		Tennessee	W 56–53	15–7 (6–4)	Stegeman Coliseum (9,730); Athens, GA
02/11/2015; 7:00 pm, SECN		at Texas A&M	W 62–53	16–7 (7–4)	Reed Arena (6,441); College Station, TX
02/14/2015; 2:00 pm, FSN		Auburn	L 68–69	16–8 (7–5)	Stegeman Coliseum (10,523); Athens, GA
02/17/2015; 7:00 pm, SECN		South Carolina	L 58–64	16–9 (7–6)	Stegeman Coliseum (6,263); Athens, GA
02/21/2015; 8:00 pm, ESPN2		at Alabama	W 66–65 ^{OT}	17–9 (8–6)	Coleman Coliseum (12,141); Tuscaloosa, AL
02/25/2015; 9:00 pm, SECN		at Ole Miss	W 76–72	18–9 (9–6)	Tad Smith Coliseum (6,899); Oxford, MS
02/28/2015; Noon, ESPNU		Missouri	W 68–44	19–9 (10–6)	Stegeman Coliseum (9,389); Athens, GA
03/03/2015; 9:00 pm, ESPN		No. 1 Kentucky	L 64–72	19–10 (10–7)	Stegeman Coliseum (10,523); Athens, GA
03/07/2015; 4:00 pm, SECN		at Auburn	W 64–61	20–10 (11–7)	Auburn Arena (9,121); Auburn, AL
SEC Tournament
03/13/2015; 10:00 pm, SECN		vs. South Carolina; Quarterfinals	W 74–62	21–10	Bridgestone Arena (13,135); Nashville, TN
03/14/2015; 3:30 pm, ESPN		vs. No. 21 Arkansas; Semifinals	L 49–60	21–11	Bridgestone Arena (19,232); Nashville, TN
NCAA tournament
03/20/2015*; 12:40 pm, truTV	(10 E)	vs. (7 E) No. 23 Michigan State; Second round	L 63–70	21–12	Time Warner Cable Arena (16,551); Charlotte, NC
*Non-conference game. ^{#}Rankings from AP Poll. (#) Tournament seedings in parentheses. E=East Region. All times are in Eastern Time.

== See also ==
- 2014–15 Georgia Lady Bulldogs basketball team
