= 2015 Atlantic Sun men's basketball tournament =

- Classification: Division I
- Season: 2014–15
- Teams: 8
- Site: campus sites
- Finals site: UNF Arena; Jacksonville, Florida
- Champions: North Florida (1st title)
- Winning coach: Matthew Driscoll (1st title)
- MVP: Demarcus Daniels (North Florida)

2014–15 Atlantic Sun men's basketball standings
	Conf.				Overall
Team	W		L	PCT	W		L	PCT
North Florida †	12	–	2	.857	23	–	12	.657
Florida Gulf Coast	11	–	3	.786	22	–	11	.667
USC Upstate	8	–	6	.571	24	–	12	.667
Lipscomb	7	–	7	.500	14	–	17	.452
Northern Kentucky*	7	–	7	.500	13	–	17	.433
Jacksonville	4	–	10	.286	10	–	22	.313
Kennesaw State	4	–	10	.286	10	–	22	.313
Stetson	3	–	11	.214	9	–	22	.290
† 2015 Atlantic Sun Tournament winner *NKU was eligible for A-Sun Tourney, but not for postseason play due to Div. I transition

The 2015 Atlantic Sun men's basketball tournament was the 37th edition of the Atlantic Sun Conference Championship. It took place from March 3 through March 8, 2015 on campus sites with the higher-seeded school hosting each game throughout the championship. The North Florida Ospreys won their first Atlantic Sun Tournament championship, earning an automatic bid to the 2015 NCAA tournament.

== Format ==
The A-Sun Championship was a six-day single-elimination tournament. Eight teams competed in the championship. On July 22, 2014, the A-Sun announced Northern Kentucky will be eligible for all conference postseason championships for which their teams qualify starting with the upcoming 2014-15 academic year, as part of their transition to Division I from Division II. The Norse must still complete the four-year reclassification period before becoming eligible for NCAA Championships. The change in A-Sun policy arose after NCAA clarification that a conference may set specific criteria allowing its highest ranked finisher to be the AQ recipient if a non-eligible team were to participate and win the conference postseason tournament. Prior policy had determined that the conference would lose its AQ if an ineligible team won the tournament. However, that potential scenario did not happen, as the Norse lost their first-round game to Lipscomb by a score of 76-73. This proved to be Northern Kentucky's only A-Sun tournament game ever, as the school would move to the Horizon League effective with the 2015–16 school year.

East Tennessee State, along with defending champion Mercer, did not participate in the tournament after moving to the Southern Conference.

With ETSU and Mercer no longer in the A-Sun and FGCU eliminated in the semifinals, the tournament winner of the championship game between USC Upstate and North Florida was assured of making their first appearance in the NCAA Tournament. North Florida would represent the A-Sun with a 63–57 win.

== Seeds ==
Seed	School	Conference	Overall	Tiebreaker
1	North Florida	12–2	20–11	
2	Florida Gulf Coast	11–3	21–9	
3	USC Upstate	8–6	21–10	
4	Northern Kentucky	7–7	13–16	1–1 vs. Lipscomb, 0–2 vs. UNF, 0–2 vs. FGCU, 2–0 vs. USC Upstate
5	Lipscomb	7–7	13–16	1–1 vs. NKU, 0–2 vs. UNF, 0–2 vs. FGCU, 1–1 vs. USC Upstate
6	Kennesaw State	4–10	10–21	2–0 vs. Jacksonville
7	Jacksonville	4–10	10–21	0–2 vs. Kennesaw State
8	Stetson	3–11	9–21	
Overall records are as of the end of the regular season.

== Schedule ==
Time	Matchup	Final score	Television
Quarterfinals – Tuesday, March 3
7:30 pm	#8 Stetson @ #1 North Florida	67–81	ESPN3
7 pm	#5 Lipscomb @ #4 Northern Kentucky	76–73(OT)	ESPN3
7 pm	#6 Kennesaw State @ #3 USC Upstate	54–90	ESPN3
7 pm	#7 Jacksonville @ #2 Florida Gulf Coast	63–81	ESPN3
Semifinals – Thursday, March 5
7 pm	#5 Lipscomb @ #1 North Florida	57–71	ESPN3
7 pm	#3 USC Upstate @ #2 Florida Gulf Coast	63–62	ESPN3
Final – Sunday, March 8
2:30 pm	#3 USC Upstate @ #1 North Florida	57–63	ESPN2
All times ET #-Tournament seed

== Bracket ==
Quarterfinals; March 3 ESPN3
1	North Florida	81
8	Stetson	67
4	Northern Kentucky	73
5	Lipscomb	76^{OT}
2	Florida Gulf Coast	81
7	Jacksonville	63
3	USC Upstate	90
6	Kennesaw State	54

Semifinals; March 5 ESPN3
1	North Florida	71
5	Lipscomb	57
2	Florida Gulf Coast	62
3	USC Upstate	63

Championship; March 8 ESPN2
1	North Florida	63
3	USC Upstate	57

== See also ==
- 2014–15 NCAA Division I men's basketball season
- Atlantic Sun men's basketball tournament
