= 2014–15 Northern Kentucky Norse men's basketball team =

American college basketball season

2014–15 Northern Kentucky Norse men's basketball
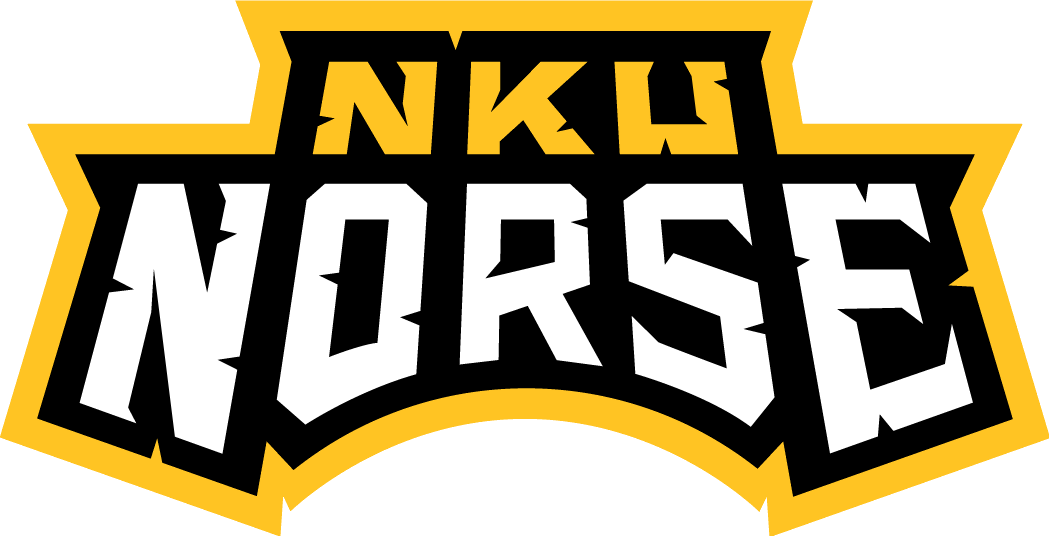
- Conference: Atlantic Sun Conference
- Record: 13–17 (7–7 A-Sun)
- Head coach: Dave Bezold (11th season)
- Assistant coaches: Kevin Schappell; Danté Jackson; Ethan Faulkner; Donnie McFarland
- Home arena: The Bank of Kentucky Center

2014–15 Atlantic Sun men's basketball standings
| | Conf. | | | | Overall |
| Team | W | | L | PCT | W | | L | PCT |
|---|---|---|---|---|---|---|---|---|
| North Florida † | 12 | – | 2 | .857 | 23 | – | 12 | .657 |
| Florida Gulf Coast | 11 | – | 3 | .786 | 22 | – | 11 | .667 |
| USC Upstate | 8 | – | 6 | .571 | 24 | – | 12 | .667 |
| Lipscomb | 7 | – | 7 | .500 | 14 | – | 17 | .452 |
| Northern Kentucky* | 7 | – | 7 | .500 | 13 | – | 17 | .433 |
| Jacksonville | 4 | – | 10 | .286 | 10 | – | 22 | .313 |
| Kennesaw State | 4 | – | 10 | .286 | 10 | – | 22 | .313 |
| Stetson | 3 | – | 11 | .214 | 9 | – | 22 | .290 |
† 2015 Atlantic Sun Tournament winner *NKU was eligible for A-Sun Tourney, but not for postseason play due to Div. I transition

The 2014–15 Northern Kentucky Norse men's basketball team represented Northern Kentucky University (NKU) during the 2014–15 NCAA Division I men's basketball season. The Norse, led by 11th-year head coach Dave Bezold, played their home games at The Bank of Kentucky Center and were members of the Atlantic Sun Conference (A-Sun). They finished the season 13–17, 7–7 in A-Sun play to finish in a tie for fourth place. Due to their transition to Division I, the Norse were ineligible to participate in NCAA-operated postseason play, specifically the NCAA tournament and NIT, and will remain ineligible for those tournaments until the 2016–17 season. However, they were eligible for the A-Sun tournament where they lost in the quarterfinals to Lipscomb.

This proved to be the final season of both Bezold's tenure at NKU and the school's membership in the A-Sun. Following the season, Bezold was fired, eventually being replaced by Alabama assistant John Brannen. Then, on May 11, 2015, it was announced that NKU would leave the A-Sun to join the Horizon League effective July 1, 2015.

== Roster ==
2014–15 Northern Kentucky Norse men's basketball team
Players
Coaches

| Pos. | # | Name | Height | Weight | Year | Hometown |
|---|---|---|---|---|---|---|
| F | 0 | Chad Jackson | 6 ft 4 in (1.93 m) | 200 lb (91 kg) | RS Sr | Lexington, Kentucky |
| G | 2 | Tayler Persons | 6 ft 3 in (1.91 m) | 230 lb (104 kg) | Fr | Kokomo, Indiana |
| G | 3 | Tyler White | 6 ft 3 in (1.91 m) | 190 lb (86 kg) | Jr | Lima, Ohio |
| F | 4 | Deontae Cole | 6 ft 6 in (1.98 m) | 200 lb (91 kg) | So | Toledo, Ohio |
| F | 5 | Jordan Garnett | 6 ft 6 in (1.98 m) | 215 lb (98 kg) | Fr | Indianapolis, Indiana |
| G | 11 | Jordan Jackson | 6 ft 2 in (1.88 m) | 185 lb (84 kg) | Sr | St. Paul, Minnesota |
| F | 13 | Daniel Camps | 6 ft 5 in (1.96 m) | 225 lb (102 kg) | So | Fayetteville, North Carolina |
| C | 20 | Jake Giesler | 6 ft 7 in (2.01 m) | 230 lb (104 kg) | Jr | Fort Thomas, Kentucky |
| F | 21 | Jalen Billups | 6 ft 6 in (1.98 m) | 240 lb (109 kg) | Jr | Cincinnati, Ohio |
| G | 22 | Matt Rosenwinkel | 6 ft 2 in (1.88 m) | 230 lb (104 kg) | So | Rochelle, Illinois |
| G | 23 | Todd Johnson | 5 ft 9 in (1.75 m) | 170 lb (77 kg) | Jr | Elkhart, Indiana |
| G | 25 | Cole Murray | 6 ft 7 in (2.01 m) | 200 lb (91 kg) | So | Delphi, Indiana |
| F | 32 | Jared Bryant | 6 ft 7 in (2.01 m) | 255 lb (116 kg) | RS Jr | Cincinnati, Ohio |
| G | 33 | Anthony Monaco | 6 ft 4 in (1.93 m) | 180 lb (82 kg) | Jr | Dover, Ohio |
| G | 44 | Dean Danos | 5 ft 11 in (1.8 m) | 175 lb (79 kg) | So | Oak Lawn, Illinois |

Head coach

Dave Bezold (Viterbo)

Assistant coach(es)

- Kevin Schappell (Northern Kentucky)
- Danté Jackson (Xavier)
- Ethan Faulkner (Northern Kentucky)

Legend

- (C) Team captain
- (S) Suspended
- (I) Ineligible
- (W) Walk-on
- Injured
- Current redshirt

Roster

== Schedule and results ==
| Date time, TV | Opponent | Result | Record | Site (attendance) city, state |
Non-conference regular season
| November 14, 2014*; 9:00 pm, BTN | at No. 3 Wisconsin | W 62–31 | 0–1 | Kohl Center (17,279); Madison, WI |
| November 16, 2014*; 2:00 pm | at No. 21 Nebraska | L 61–80 | 0–2 | Pinnacle Bank Arena (15,479); Lincoln, NE |
| November 19, 2014*; 7:00 pm | North Carolina A&T | W 68–55 | 1–2 | The Bank of Kentucky Center (1,505); Highland Heights, KY |
| November 22, 2014*; 7:00 pm | Ohio Mid-Western | W 98–48 | 2–2 | The Bank of Kentucky Center (1,942); Highland Heights, KY |
| November 26, 2014*; 9:00 pm | at Eastern Washington | L 60–81 | 2–3 | Reese Court (1,003); Cheney, WA |
| November 29, 2014*; 10:00 pm | at Idaho | W 79–74 | 3–3 | Memorial Gym (227); Moscow, ID |
| December 3, 2014*; 7:00 pm | UT Martin | L 56–71 | 3–4 | The Bank of Kentucky Center (1,272); Highland Heights, KY |
| December 7, 2014*; 7:00 pm | No. 16 West Virginia | L 42–67 | 3–5 | The Bank of Kentucky Center (5,089); Highland Heights, KY |
| December 14, 2014*; 2:00 pm | UC–Clermont | W 107–53 | 4–5 | The Bank of Kentucky Center (1,181); Highland Heights, KY |
| December 16, 2014*; 7:00 pm | at Chattanooga | L 81–93 | 4–6 | McKenzie Arena (2,361); Chattanooga, TN |
| December 19, 2014*; 7:00 pm | at Morehead State | W 83–60 | 5–6 | Ellis Johnson Arena (1,435); Morehead, KY |
| December 22, 2014*; 7:00 pm | Idaho | W 81–68 | 6–6 | The Bank of Kentucky Center (1,255); Highland Heights, KY |
| December 27, 2014*; 3:00 PM, BTN | at Northwestern | L 55–76 | 6–7 | Welsh-Ryan Arena (6,650); Evanston, IL |
| December 31, 2014*; 12:00 pm, ESPN3 | at Youngstown State | L 74–78 | 6–8 | Beeghly Center (1,396); Youngstown, OH |
| January 3, 2015*; 4:00 pm, ESPN3 | Toledo | L 55–57 | 6–9 | The Bank of Kentucky Center (2,055); Highland Heights, KY |
Atlantic Sun regular season
| January 10, 2015; 7:30 pm | at Lipscomb | L 61–80 | 6–10 (0–1) | Allen Arena (621); Nashville, TN |
| January 14, 2015; 7:00 pm | Kennesaw State | W 76–72 | 7–10 (1–1) | The Bank of Kentucky Center (1,547); Highland Heights, KY |
| January 17, 2015; 2:00 pm, ESPN3 | at USC Upstate | W 66–65 | 8–10 (2–1) | G. B. Hodge Center (801); Spartanburg, SC |
| January 22, 2015; 7:00 pm, ESPN3 | North Florida | L 66–74 | 8–11 (2–2) | The Bank of Kentucky Center (2,090); Highland Heights, KY |
| January 24, 2015; 1:00 pm, ESPN3 | Jacksonville | W 81–59 | 9–11 (3–2) | The Bank of Kentucky Center (1,443); Highland Heights, KY |
| January 29, 2015; 7:00 pm, ESPN3 | at Stetson | L 75–85 | 9–12 (3–3) | Edmunds Center (823); DeLand, FL |
| January 31, 2015; 7:00 pm | at Florida Gulf Coast | L 64–74 | 9–13 (3–4) | Alico Arena (4,550); Fort Myers, FL |
| February 7, 2015; 7:00 pm, ESPN3 | Lipscomb | W 77–60 | 10–13 (4–4) | The Bank of Kentucky Center (3,887); Highland Heights, KY |
| February 12, 2015; 7:00 pm, ESPN3 | Florida Gulf Coast | L 59–65 | 10–14 (4–5) | The Bank of Kentucky Center (2,226); Highland Heights, KY |
| February 14, 2015; 7:00 pm, ESPN3 | Stetson | W 82–57 | 11–14 (5–5) | The Bank of Kentucky Center (1,520); Highland Heights, KY |
| February 19, 2015; 7:00 pm | at Jacksonville | L 75–83 ^{OT} | 11–15 (5–6) | Swisher Gymnasium (713); Jacksonville, FL |
| February 21, 2015; 7:00 pm, ESPN3 | at North Florida | L 69–88 | 11–16 (5–7) | UNF Arena (1,427); Jacksonville, FL |
| February 26, 2015; 12:00 pm, ESPN3 | at Kennesaw State; Postponed from 2/25/15 | W 78–53 | 12–16 (6–7) | KSU Convocation Center (682); Kennesaw, GA |
| February 28, 2015; 7:00 pm, ESPN3 | USC Upstate | W 84–65 | 13–16 (7–7) | The Bank of Kentucky Center (2,064); Highland Heights, KY |
Atlantic Sun tournament
| March 3, 2015; 7:00 pm, ESPN3 | Lipscomb; Quarterfinals | L 73–76 ^{OT} | 13–17 | The Bank of Kentucky Center (1,157); Highland Heights, KY |
*Non-conference game. ^{#}Rankings from AP Poll. (#) Tournament seedings in parentheses. All times are in Eastern Time.
