= 2014–15 Southeastern Conference men's basketball season =

2014–15 SEC Men's Basketball Season
- League: NCAA Division I
- Sport: Basketball
- Teams: 14
- TV partner(s): CBS, ESPN, SEC Network

Regular Season
- 2015 SEC Champions: Kentucky
- Season MVP: Bobby Portis, Arkansas

Tournament
- Venue: Bridgestone Arena, Nashville, Tennessee
- Champions: Kentucky
- Runners-up: Arkansas
- Finals MVP: Willie Cauley-Stein, Kentucky

Basketball seasons
- ← 2013–14 2015–16 →

2014–15 Southeastern Conference men's basketball standings
| | Conf. | | | | Overall |
| Team | W | | L | PCT | W | | L | PCT |
|---|---|---|---|---|---|---|---|---|
| No. 1 Kentucky † | 18 | – | 0 | 1.000 | 38 | – | 1 | .974 |
| No. 21 Arkansas | 13 | – | 5 | .722 | 27 | – | 9 | .750 |
| LSU | 11 | – | 7 | .611 | 22 | – | 11 | .667 |
| Georgia | 11 | – | 7 | .611 | 21 | – | 12 | .636 |
| Texas A&M | 11 | – | 7 | .611 | 21 | – | 12 | .636 |
| Ole Miss | 11 | – | 7 | .611 | 21 | – | 13 | .618 |
| Vanderbilt | 9 | – | 9 | .500 | 21 | – | 14 | .600 |
| Alabama | 8 | – | 10 | .444 | 19 | – | 15 | .559 |
| Florida | 8 | – | 10 | .444 | 16 | – | 17 | .485 |
| Tennessee | 7 | – | 11 | .389 | 16 | – | 16 | .500 |
| South Carolina | 6 | – | 12 | .333 | 17 | – | 16 | .515 |
| Mississippi State | 6 | – | 12 | .333 | 13 | – | 19 | .406 |
| Auburn | 4 | – | 14 | .222 | 15 | – | 20 | .429 |
| Missouri | 3 | – | 15 | .167 | 9 | – | 23 | .281 |
† 2015 SEC tournament winner Rankings from AP poll

The 2014–15 Southeastern Conference men's basketball season began with practices in October 2014, followed by the start of the 2014–15 NCAA Division I men's basketball season in November. Conference play started in early January 2015 and concluded in March, followed by the 2015 SEC men's basketball tournament at the Bridgestone Arena in Nashville.

== Preseason ==
SEC recruits at the 2014 McDonald's All-American Boys Game

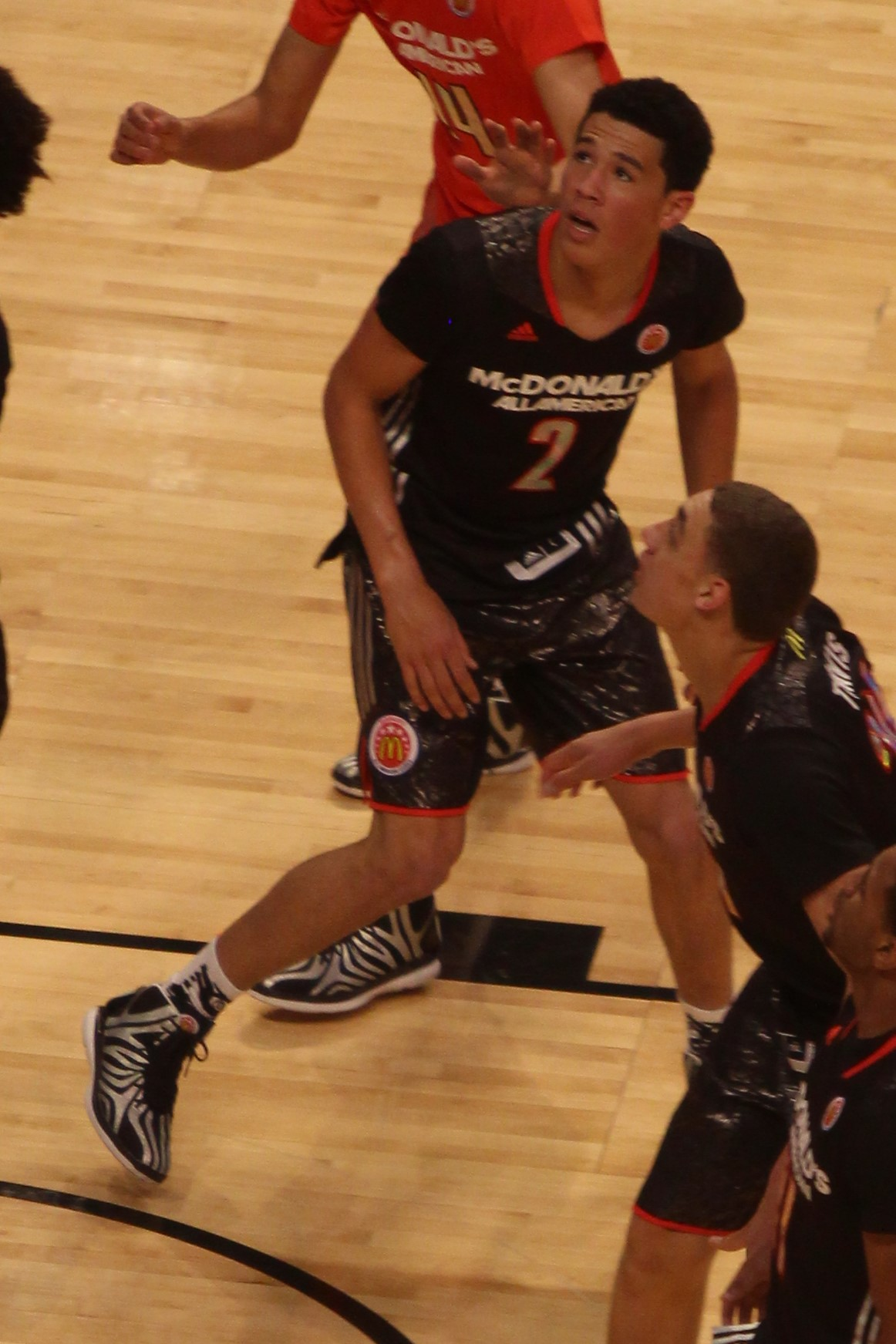
Devin Booker

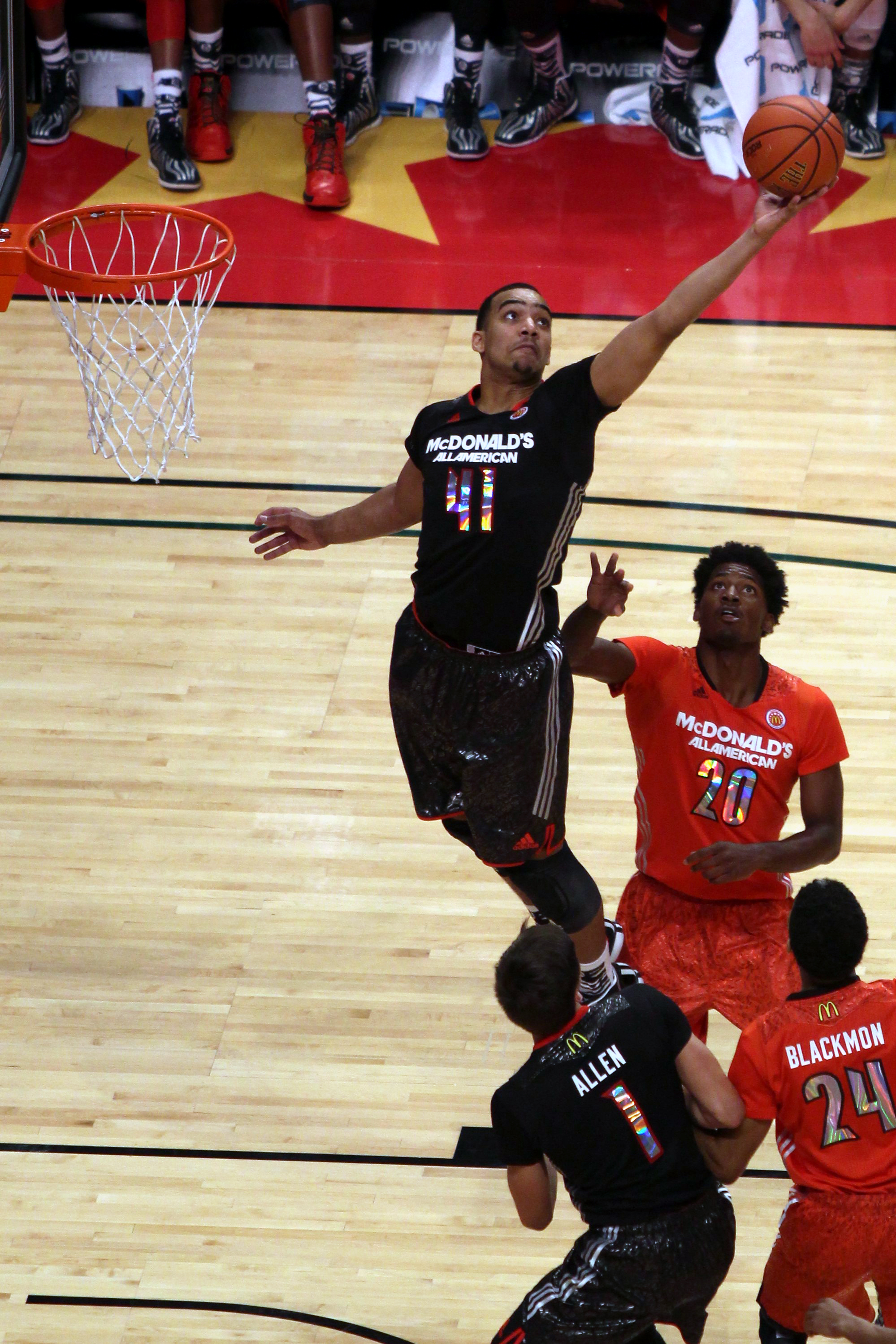
Trey Lyles

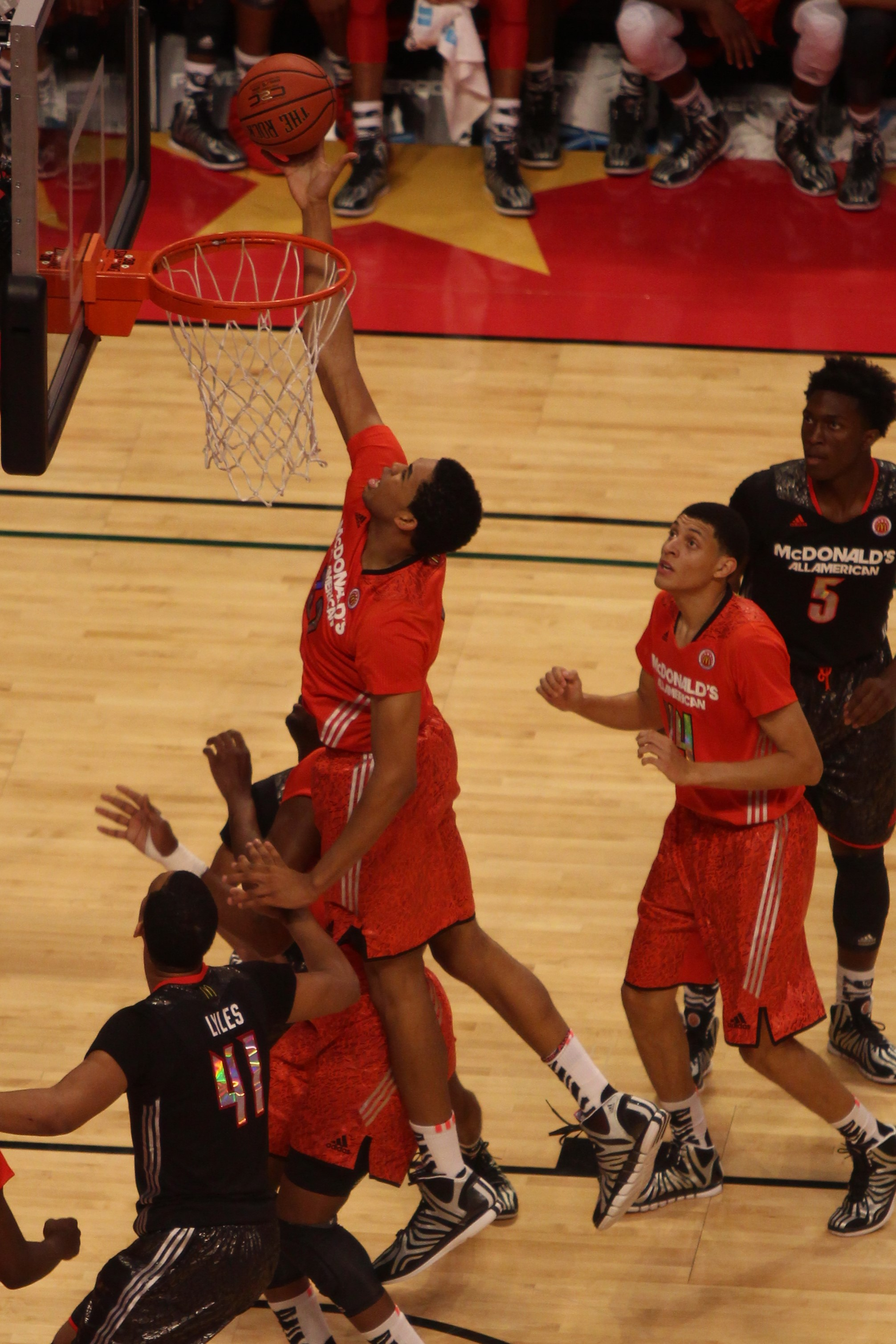
Karl-Anthony Towns

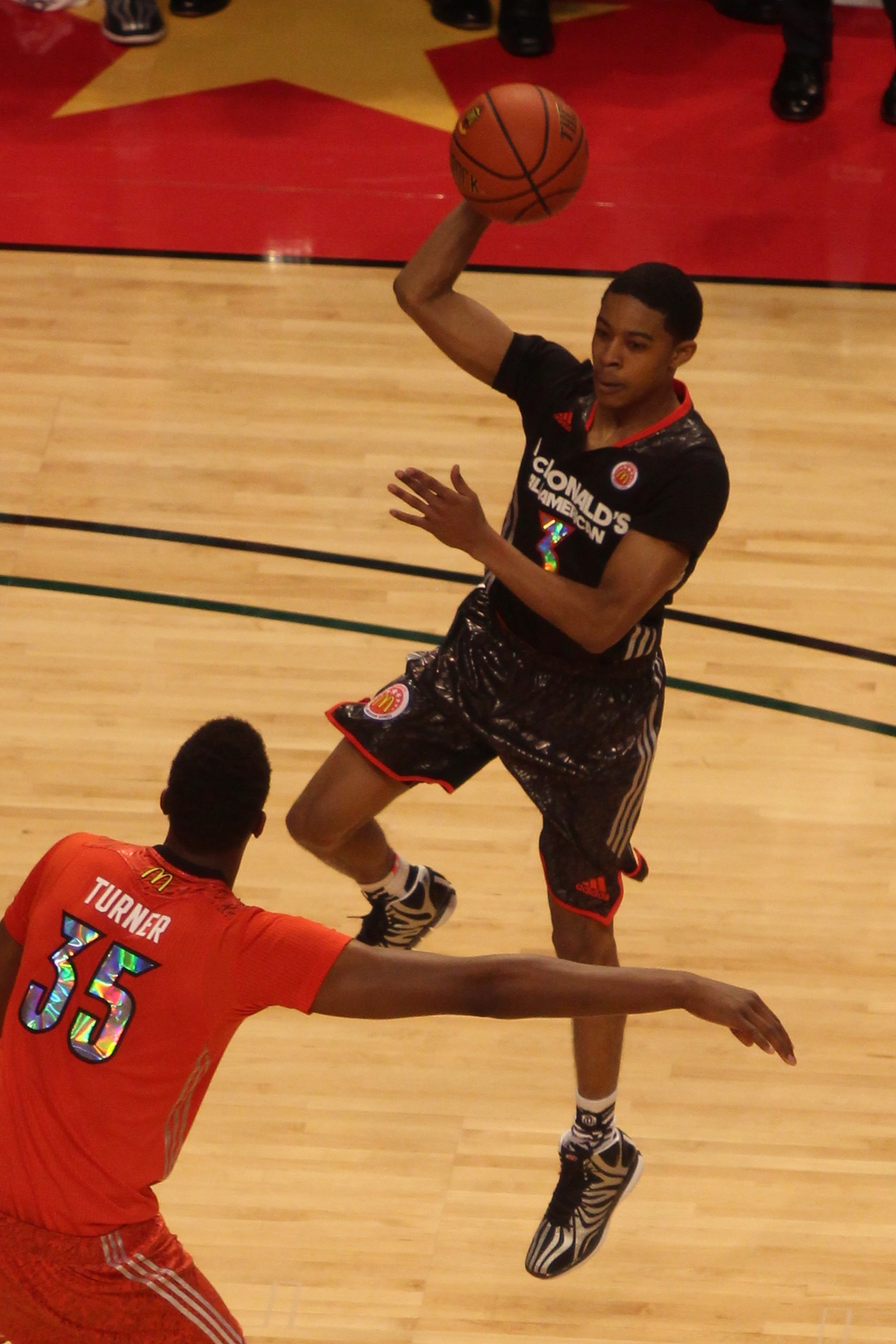
Tyler Ulis

| | Media |
| 1. | Kentucky (20) |
| 2. | Florida |
| 3. | Arkansas |
| 4. | LSU |
| 5. | Georgia |
| 6. | Ole Miss |
| 7. | Missouri |
| 8. | Auburn |
| 9. | Texas A&M |
| 10. | Alabama |
| 11. | Vanderbilt |
| 12. | South Carolina |
| 13. | Tennessee |
| 14. | Mississippi State |

() first place votes

=== Preseason All-SEC teams ===
Media
Bobby Portis ARKANSAS
Michael Frazier FLORIDA
**Aaron Harrison KENTUCKY**
Jordan Mickey LSU
Jarvis Summers OLE MISS

- Coaches select 8 players
- Players in bold are choices for SEC Player of the Year

== Rankings ==
Legend
| Increase in ranking |
| Decrease in ranking |
| Not ranked previous week |

| | | Pre | Wk 2 | Wk 3 | Wk 4 | Wk 5 | Wk 6 | Wk 7 | Wk 8 | Wk 9 | Wk 10 | Wk 11 | Wk 12 | Wk 13 | Wk 14 | Wk 15 | Wk 16 | Wk 17 | Wk 18 | Wk 19 | Final |
|---|---|---|---|---|---|---|---|---|---|---|---|---|---|---|---|---|---|---|---|---|---|
| Alabama | AP | | | | | | | | | | | | | | | | | | | | |
| Alabama | C | | | | | | | | | | | | | | | | | | | | |
| Arkansas | AP | RV | RV | 25 | 18 | RV | RV | RV | RV | 23 | 19 | RV | RV | RV | 24 | 18 | 18 | 18 | 21 | 21 | |
| Arkansas | C | RV | RV | RV | 21 | RV | RV | RV | RV | 25 | 19 | RV | 25 | RV | 23 | 17 | 16 | 18 | 20 | 20 | 20 |
| Auburn | AP | | | | | | | | | | | | | | | | | | | | |
| Auburn | C | | | | | | | | | | | | | | | | | | | | |
| Florida | AP | 7 | 8 | 18 | RV | | | RV | RV | | | | | | | | | | | | |
| Florida | C | 7 | 7 | 16 | 24 | RV | RV | RV | | | | | | | | | | | | | |
| Georgia | AP | | | | | | | | | | | RV | RV | RV | | | | | | | |
| Georgia | C | | | | | | | | | | | | RV | | | | | | | | |
| Kentucky | AP | 1 | 1 | 1 | 1 | 1 | 1 | 1 | 1 | 1 | 1 | 1 | 1 | 1 | 1 | 1 | 1 | 1 | 1 | 1 | |
| Kentucky | C | 1 | 1 | 1 | 1 | 1 | 1 | 1 | 1 | 1 | 1 | 1 | 1 | 1 | 1 | 1 | 1 | 1 | 1 | 1 | 3 |
| LSU | AP | RV | RV | | | RV | RV | RV | RV | RV | RV | RV | RV | | | | | RV | RV | | |
| LSU | C | | RV | | | RV | RV | RV | RV | RV | RV | RV | RV | RV | RV | RV | | RV | RV | | |
| Mississippi State | AP | | | | | | | | | | | | | | | | | | | | |
| Mississippi State | C | | | | | | | | | | | | | | | | | | | | |
| Missouri | AP | | | | | | | | | | | | | | | | | | | | |
| Missouri | C | | | | | | | | | | | | | | | | | | | | |
| Ole Miss | AP | | | | | | | | | | | | | RV | | | | | | | |
| Ole Miss | C | | | | | | | | | | | | | | RV | | RV | RV | | | |
| South Carolina | AP | | | | | | | | | RV | | | | | | | | | | | |
| South Carolina | C | | | | | | | | | RV | | | | | | | | | | | |
| Tennessee | AP | | | | | | | | | | | RV | | | | | | | | | |
| Tennessee | C | | | | | | | | | | | | | | | | | | | | |
| Texas A&M | AP | | | | | | | | | | | | RV | RV | RV | RV | RV | RV | | | |
| Texas A&M | C | | | | | | | | | | | | RV | RV | RV | RV | RV | RV | RV | | |
| Vanderbilt | AP | | | | | | | | | | | | | | | | | | | | |
| Vanderbilt | C | | | | | | | | | | | | | | | | | | | | |

== SEC regular season ==
=== Conference matrix ===
This table summarizes the head-to-head results between teams in conference play.

| | Alabama | Arkansas | Auburn | Florida | Georgia | Kentucky | LSU | Mississippi State | Missouri | Ole Miss | South Carolina | Tennessee | Texas A&M | Vanderbilt |
|---|---|---|---|---|---|---|---|---|---|---|---|---|---|---|
| vs. Alabama | – | 1–0 | 0–2 | 1–0 | 1–0 | 2–0 | 1–0 | 0–1 | 0–1 | 1–0 | 1–1 | 0–1 | 0–2 | 2–0 |
| vs. Arkansas | 0–1 | – | 0–1 | 1–0 | 0–1 | 1–0 | 1–0 | 0–2 | 0–2 | 1–1 | 0–2 | 1–1 | 0–1 | 0–1 |
| vs. Auburn | 2–0 | 1–0 | – | 1–0 | 1–1 | 1–0 | 1–1 | 1–0 | 1–1 | 1–0 | 0–1 | 1–0 | 2–0 | 1–0 |
| vs. Florida | 0–1 | 0–1 | 0–1 | – | 1–0 | 2–0 | 2–0 | 0–1 | 1–0 | 2–0 | 0–1 | 0–1 | 1–1 | 1–1 |
| vs. Georgia | 0–1 | 1–0 | 1–1 | 0–1 | – | 2–0 | 1–0 | 0–1 | 0–1 | 0–2 | 2–0 | 0–1 | 0–1 | 0–2 |
| vs. Kentucky | 0–2 | 0–1 | 0–1 | 0–2 | 0–2 | – | 0–1 | 0–1 | 0–2 | 0–1 | 0–2 | 0–1 | 0–1 | 0–1 |
| vs. LSU | 0–1 | 0–1 | 1–1 | 0–2 | 0–1 | 1–0 | – | 1–0 | 1–0 | 0–2 | 0–1 | 1–1 | 2–0 | 0–1 |
| vs. Mississippi State | 1–0 | 2–0 | 0–1 | 1–0 | 1–0 | 1–0 | 0–1 | – | 0–2 | 1–0 | 1–0 | 1–1 | 1–0 | 1–1 |
| vs. Missouri | 1–0 | 2–0 | 1–1 | 0–1 | 1–0 | 2–0 | 0–1 | 2–0 | – | 1–0 | 1–0 | 1–0 | 2–0 | 1–0 |
| vs. Ole Miss | 0–1 | 1–1 | 0–1 | 0–2 | 2–0 | 1–0 | 2–0 | 0–2 | 0–1 | – | 0–1 | 0–1 | 0–1 | 1–0 |
| vs. South Carolina | 1–1 | 2–0 | 1–0 | 1–0 | 0–2 | 2–0 | 1–0 | 0–1 | 0–1 | 1–0 | – | 1–1 | 1–0 | 1–0 |
| vs. Tennessee | 1–0 | 1–1 | 0–1 | 1–0 | 1–0 | 1–0 | 1–1 | 1–1 | 0–1 | 1–0 | 1–1 | – | 1–0 | 1–1 |
| vs. Texas A&M | 2–0 | 1–0 | 0–2 | 1–1 | 1–0 | 1–0 | 0–2 | 0–1 | 0–2 | 1–0 | 0–1 | 0–1 | – | 0–1 |
| vs. Vanderbilt | 0–2 | 1–0 | 0–1 | 1–1 | 2–0 | 1–0 | 1–0 | 1–1 | 0–1 | 0–1 | 0–1 | 1–1 | 1–0 | – |
| Total | 8–10 | 13–5 | 4–14 | 8–10 | 11–7 | 18–0 | 11–7 | 6–12 | 3–15 | 11–7 | 6–12 | 7–11 | 11–7 | 9–9 |

== Postseason ==
=== SEC tournament ===
- March 11–15, 2015 Southeastern Conference Basketball Tournament, Bridgestone Arena, Nashville.

**First round** Wednesday, March 11; SEC Network
12 | Mississippi State | 68
13 | **Auburn** | **74**
11 | **South Carolina** | **63**
14 | Missouri | 54

**Second round** Thursday, March 12; SEC Network
8 | **Florida** | **69**
9 | Alabama | 61
5 | Texas A&M | 59
13 | **Auburn** | **66**
7 | Vanderbilt | 61
10 | **Tennessee** | **67**
6 | Ole Miss | 58
11 | **South Carolina** | **60**

**Quarterfinals**; Friday, March 13; SEC Network
1 | **#1 Kentucky** | **64**
8 | Florida | 49
4 | LSU | 70
13 | **Auburn** | **73**^{OT}
2 | **#21 Arkansas** | **80**
10 | Tennessee | 72
3 | **Georgia** | **74**
11 | South Carolina | 62

**Semifinals**; Saturday, March 14; ESPN
1 | **#1 Kentucky** | **91**
13 | Auburn | 67
2 | **#21 Arkansas** | **60**
3 | Georgia | 49

**Championship**; Sunday, March 15; ESPN
1 | **#1 Kentucky** | **78**
2 | #21 Arkansas | 63

=== NCAA tournament ===
| Seed | Region | School | First Four | 2nd Round | 3rd Round | Sweet 16 | Elite Eight | Final Four |
|---|---|---|---|---|---|---|---|---|
| 1 | Midwest | **Kentucky** | | **W, 79–56** vs. #16 Hampton – (Louisville) | **W, 64–51** vs. #8 Cincinnati – (Louisville) | **W, 78–39** vs. #5 West Virginia – (Cleveland) | **W, 68–66** vs. #3 Notre Dame – (Cleveland) | **L, 64–71** vs. #1 Wisconsin – (Indianapolis) |
| 5 | West | **Arkansas** | | **W, 56–53** vs. #12 Wofford – (Jacksonville) | **L, 78–87** vs. #4 North Carolina – (Jacksonville) | | | |
| 9 | East | **LSU** | | **L, 65–66** vs. #8 NC State – (Pittsburgh) | | | | |
| 10 | East | **Georgia** | | **L, 63–70** vs. #7 Michigan State – (Charlotte) | | | | |
| 11 | West | **Ole Miss** | **W 94–90** vs. #11 BYU – (Dayton) | **L, 57–67** vs. #6 Xavier – (Jacksonville) | | | | |

=== NIT ===
| Seed | Region | School | First round | Second round | Quarterfinals |
|---|---|---|---|---|---|
| 2 | Temple Bracket | **Texas A&M** | **W, 81–64** vs. #7 Montana – (College Station) | **L, 72–84** vs. #3 Louisiana Tech – (College Station) | |
| 5 | Colorado State Bracket | **Vanderbilt** | **W, 75–64** vs. #4 Saint Mary's – (Moraga) | **W, 92–77** vs. #8 South Dakota State – (Nashville) | **L, 75–78** vs. #5 Stanford – (Palo Alto) |
| 6 | Richmond Bracket | **Alabama** | **W, 79–58** vs. #3 Illinois – (Tuscaloosa) | **L, 66–73** vs. #2 Miami – (Coral Gables) | |

== NBA draft ==
| PG | Point guard | SG | Shooting guard | SF | Small forward | PF | Power forward | C | Center |

| Player | Team | Round | Pick # | Position | School | Nationality |
|---|---|---|---|---|---|---|
| Karl-Anthony Towns | Minnesota Timberwolves | 1 | 1 | C | Kentucky | Dominican Republic |
| Willie Cauley-Stein | Sacramento Kings | 1 | 6 | PF | Kentucky | United States |
| Trey Lyles | Utah Jazz | 1 | 12 | PF | Kentucky | Canada |
| Devin Booker | Phoenix Suns | 1 | 13 | SG | Kentucky | United States |
| Bobby Portis | Chicago Bulls | 1 | 22 | PF | Arkansas | United States |
| Jarell Martin | Memphis Grizzlies | 1 | 25 | PF | LSU | United States |
| Jordan Mickey | Utah Jazz | 2 | 33 | PF | LSU | United States |
| Josh Richardson | Miami Heat | 2 | 40 | SG | Tennessee | United States |
| Andrew Harrison | Phoenix Suns | 2 | 44 | PG | Kentucky | United States |
| Dakari Johnson | Oklahoma City Thunder | 2 | 48 | C | Kentucky | United States |

== Honors and awards ==
=== All-Americans ===
Starting on March 6, the 2015 NCAA Men's Basketball All-Americans were released for 2014–15 season, based upon selections by the four major syndicates. The four syndicates include the Associated Press, USBWA, NABC, and Sporting News.

AP

First Team

- Willie Cauley-Stein, Kentucky

Second Team

- Bobby Portis, Arkansas
- Karl-Anthony Towns, Kentucky
USBWA

First Team

- Willie Cauley-Stein, Kentucky

Second Team

- Bobby Portis, Arkansas
NABC

First Team

- Willie Cauley-Stein, Kentucky

Third Team

- Karl-Anthony Towns, Kentucky
Sporting News

First Team

- Willie Cauley-Stein, Kentucky

Third Team

- Bobby Portis, Arkansas
- Karl-Anthony Towns, Kentucky

=== All-SEC awards and teams ===
==== Coaches ====
**2015 SEC Men's Basketball Individual Awards**
| Award | Recipient(s) |
| Player of the Year | **Bobby Portis**, So., F, ARKANSAS |
| Coach of the Year | **John Calipari**, KENTUCKY |
| Defensive Player of the Year | **Willie Cauley-Stein**, Jr., C, KENTUCKY |
| Freshman of the Year | **Karl-Anthony Towns**, F, KENTUCKY |
| Scholar-Athlete of the Year | **Levi Randolph**, Sr., F, ALABAMA |
| Sixth Man Award | **Devin Booker**, Fr., G, KENTUCKY |

**2015 SEC Men's Basketball All-Conference Teams**
| First Team | Second Team | All-Freshman Team | All-Defensive Team |
| Willie Cauley-Stein Jr., C, KENTUCKY; Danuel House Jr., F, TEXAS A&M; Damian Jones So., F, VANDERBILT; Bobby Portis So., F, ARKANSAS; Jarell Martin So., F, LSU; Jordan Mickey So., F, LSU; Stefan Moody Jr., G, OLE MISS; Josh Richardson Sr., G, TENNESSEE; Karl-Anthony Towns Fr., C, KENTUCKY | Devin Booker Fr., G, KENTUCKY; Dorian Finney-Smith Jr., F, FLORIDA; K. T. Harrell Sr., G, AUBURN; Aaron Harrison So., G, KENTUCKY; Jalen Jones Jr., F, TEXAS A&M; Michael Qualls Jr., G, ARKANSAS; Levi Randolph Sr., F, ALABAMA; Craig Sword Jr., G, MISSISSIPPI STATE; Marcus Thornton Sr., F, GEORGIA | Wade Baldwin IV Fr., G, VANDERBILT; Anton Beard Fr., G, ARKANSAS; Devin Booker Fr., G, KENTUCKY; Riley LaChance Fr., G, VANDERBILT; Trey Lyles Fr., G, KENTUCKY; Devin Robinson Fr., F, FLORIDA; Karl-Anthony Towns Fr., C, KENTUCKY; Tyler Ulis Fr., G, KENTUCKY | Willie Cauley-Stein, Jr., C, KENTUCKY; Damian JonesSo., F, VANDERBILT; Jordan Mickey, So., F, LSU; Josh Richardson, Sr., G, TENNESSEE; Marcus Thornton Sr., F, GEORGIA |
† - denotes unanimous selection
