= 2014–15 Texas A&M Aggies men's basketball team =

American college basketball season

2014–15 Texas A&M Aggies men's basketball

NIT, Second Round
- Conference: Southeastern Conference
- Record: 21–12 (11–7 SEC)
- Head coach: Billy Kennedy (4th season)
- Assistant coaches: Kyle Keller (4th season); Rick Stansbury (1st season); Amir Abdur-Rahim (1st season)
- Home arena: Reed Arena

2014–15 Southeastern Conference men's basketball standings
	Conf.				Overall
Team	W		L	PCT	W		L	PCT
No. 1 Kentucky †	18	–	0	1.000	38	–	1	.974
No. 21 Arkansas	13	–	5	.722	27	–	9	.750
LSU	11	–	7	.611	22	–	11	.667
Georgia	11	–	7	.611	21	–	12	.636
Texas A&M	11	–	7	.611	21	–	12	.636
Ole Miss	11	–	7	.611	21	–	13	.618
Vanderbilt	9	–	9	.500	21	–	14	.600
Alabama	8	–	10	.444	19	–	15	.559
Florida	8	–	10	.444	16	–	17	.485
Tennessee	7	–	11	.389	16	–	16	.500
South Carolina	6	–	12	.333	17	–	16	.515
Mississippi State	6	–	12	.333	13	–	19	.406
Auburn	4	–	14	.222	15	–	20	.429
Missouri	3	–	15	.167	9	–	23	.281
† 2015 SEC tournament winner Rankings from AP poll

The 2014–15 Texas A&M Aggies men's basketball team represented Texas A&M University in the 2014–15 NCAA Division I men's basketball season. The team's head coach was Billy Kennedy, who was in his fourth season. The team played their home games at the Reed Arena in College Station, Texas and played in its third season as a member of the Southeastern Conference. They finished the season 21–12, 11–7 in SEC play to finish in a four-way tie for third place. They lost in the second round of the SEC tournament to Auburn. They were invited to the National Invitation Tournament, where they defeated Montana in the first round before losing in the second round to Louisiana Tech. The Texas A&M men's basketball team and support staff were the recipients of the men's SEC Sportsmanship Award.

== Before the season ==
=== Departures ===
Name	Number	Pos.	Height	Weight	Year	Hometown	Reason for departure
Shawn Smith	2	G	6'4"	192	RS freshman	Jacksonville, FL	Transferred to Northwest Florida State College
Blake McDonald	10	G	5'11"	175	Senior	Spring, TX	Graduated
J-Mychal Reese	11	G	6'1"	187	Sophomore	Bryan, TX	Dismissed from the team; transferred to North Texas
Fabyon Harris	12	G	5'11"	178	Senior	Chicago, IL	Graduated
Don Thomas	20	G	6'0"	185	Junior	Spring, TX	Left the team
Jamal Jones	23	G	6'8"	197	Junior	Wynne, AR	Transferred

=== Incoming transfers ===
Name	Number	Pos.	Height	Weight	Year	Hometown	Previous school
Jalen Jones	12	G	6'7"	220	RS junior	Dallas, TX	Transferred from SMU. Since Jones sat out during the 2013–14 season after transferring from SMU during the 2013–14 season, he was eligible to play.
Danuel House	23	G	6'7"	195	Junior	Sugar Land, TX	Transferred from Houston. Under NCAA transfer rules, House had to redshirt for the 2014–15 season. Had two years of remaining eligibility.

== Recruits ==
College recruiting
Name	Hometown	School	Height	Weight	Commit date
Alex Robinson; PG	Arlington, TX	Timberview	6 ft 1 in (1.85 m)	170 lb (77 kg)	Sep 17, 2013
Alex Robinson; PG	Recruit ratings: Scout: Rivals: 247Sports: ESPN:				
Peyton Allen; SG	Chatham, IL	Glenwood	6 ft 5 in (1.96 m)	185 lb (84 kg)	Feb 13, 2014
Peyton Allen; SG	Recruit ratings: Scout: Rivals: 247Sports: ESPN:				
Avery Johnson Jr. PG	Plano, TX	Plano West	5 ft 9 in (1.75 m)	175 lb (79 kg)	Apr 12, 2014
Avery Johnson Jr. PG	Recruit ratings: Scout: Rivals: 247Sports: ESPN:				
Overall recruit ranking: Scout: Not Ranked Rivals: Not Ranked ESPN: Not Ranked
Note: In many cases, Scout, Rivals, 247Sports, On3, and ESPN may conflict in their listings of height and weight.; In these cases, the average was taken. ESPN grades are on a 100-point scale.; Sources: "Texas A&M 2014 Basketball Commitments". Rivals.; "2014 Texas A&M Basketball Commits". Scout.; "ESPN". ESPN.; "Scout.com Team Recruiting Rankings". Scout.; "2014 Team Ranking". Rivals.

== Recruits for class of 2015 ==
College recruiting
Name	Hometown	School	Height	Weight	Commit date
Chris Harris; C	Houston, TX	Madison	6 ft 9 in (2.06 m)	200 lb (91 kg)	Oct 28, 2013
Chris Harris; C	Recruit ratings: Scout: Rivals: (85)				
Sidy Ndir; SG	Orlando, FL	West Oaks Academy	6 ft 2 in (1.88 m)	175 lb (79 kg)	Nov 9, 2013
Sidy Ndir; SG	Recruit ratings: Rivals: (70)				
Overall recruit ranking: Scout: Not Ranked Rivals: Not Ranked ESPN: Not Ranked
Note: In many cases, Scout, Rivals, 247Sports, On3, and ESPN may conflict in their listings of height and weight.; In these cases, the average was taken. ESPN grades are on a 100-point scale.; Sources: "Texas A&M 2015 Basketball Commitments". Rivals.; "2015 Texas A&M Basketball Commits". Scout.; "ESPN". ESPN.; "Scout.com Team Recruiting Rankings". Scout.; "2015 Team Ranking". Rivals.

== Roster ==
2014–15 Texas A&M Aggies men's basketball team
Players
Coaches

Pos.	#	Name	Height	Weight	Year	Previous school	Hometown
G	0	Avery Johnson	5 ft 11 in (1.8 m)	182 lb (83 kg)	Fr	Plano West HS	Plano, Texas
F	2	Derek Cahn	6 ft 5 in (1.96 m)	199 lb (90 kg)	Fr	Highland Park HS	Highland Park, Texas
G	3	Alex Robinson	6 ft 1 in (1.85 m)	174 lb (79 kg)	Fr	Timberview HS	Arlington, Texas
F	4	Tavario Miller	6 ft 7 in (2.01 m)	226 lb (103 kg)	So	Wheatley (TX)	Long Island, Bahamas
G	5	Jordan Green	6 ft 5 in (1.96 m)	188 lb (85 kg)	Sr	Flower Mound	Flower Mound, Texas
C	10	Tonny Trocha-Morelos (W)	6 ft 10 in (2.08 m)	221 lb (100 kg)	Fr	Mayor Jose Celestino Mutis	Cartagena, Colombia
G/F	12	Jalen Jones	6 ft 7 in (2.01 m)	223 lb (101 kg)	RS Jr	SMU	Dallas, Texas
G	13	Juan Aparicio	6 ft 4 in (1.93 m)	194 lb (88 kg)	Jr	Second Baptist (TX)	Bogotá, Colombia
F	14	Kourtney Roberson	6 ft 9 in (2.06 m)	247 lb (112 kg)	Sr	Arcadia	Arcadia, Louisiana
F	15	Davonte Fitzgerald	6 ft 7 in (2.01 m)	209 lb (95 kg)	So	Tucker	Tucker, Georgia
G	21	Alex Caruso	6 ft 5 in (1.96 m)	184 lb (83 kg)	Jr	A&M Consolidated	College Station, Texas
G	22	Peyton Allen	6 ft 5 in (1.96 m)	202 lb (92 kg)	Fr	Glenwood HS	Chatham, Illinois
G	22	Ramon White	6 ft 2 in (1.88 m)	160 lb (73 kg)	Jr	North Side HS	Fort Worth, Texas
G	23	Danuel House (redshirt)	6 ft 7 in (2.01 m)	195 lb (88 kg)	Jr	Houston	Sugar Land, Texas
F	24	Antwan Space	6 ft 8 in (2.03 m)	229 lb (104 kg)	RS Jr	Florida State	DeSoto, Texas
G	25	Kyle Dobbins	6 ft 0 in (1.83 m)	175 lb (79 kg)	So	Memorial	Houston, Texas
C	45	Dylan Johns	6 ft 11 in (2.11 m)	228 lb (103 kg)	RS So	Copleston	Ipswich, England

Head coach

- Billy Kennedy (Southeastern Louisiana)

Assistant coach(es)

- Kyle Keller (Oklahoma State)
- Rick Stansbury (Campbellsville)
- Amir Abdur-Rahim (Murray State)

Legend

- (C) Team captain
- (S) Suspended
- (I) Ineligible
- (W) Walk-on
- Injured
- Current redshirt

Roster

== Schedule and results ==
Date time, TV	Rank^{#}	Opponent^{#}	Result	Record	High points	High rebounds	High assists	Site (attendance) city, state
Exhibition
11/05/2014*; 7:00 pm		Texas A&M–Commerce	W 80–71	–	16 – Jones	9 – Jones	8 – Caruso	Reed Arena (4,074); College Station, TX
Non-conference games
11/14/2014*; 7:00 pm		Northwestern State	W 109–68	1–0	16 – Tied	9 – Fitzgerald	8 – Caruso	Reed Arena (5,254); College Station, TX
11/20/2014*; 9:30 am, ESPNU		vs. Dayton; Puerto Rico Tip-Off Quarterfinals	L 53–55	1–1	17 – Caruso	15 – Roberson	5 – Caruso	Roberto Clemente Coliseum (6,723); San Juan, PR
11/21/2014*; 12:00 pm, ESPNU		vs. College of Charleston; Puerto Rico Tip-Off consolation round	W 59–50	2–1	14 – Allen	11 – Jones	7 – Caruso	Roberto Clemente Coliseum (7,438); San Juan, PR
11/23/2014*; 2:00 pm, ESPNU		vs. New Mexico; Puerto Rico Tip-Off 5th place game	W 64–51	3–1	18 – House	8 – Caruso, Jones	10 – Caruso	Roberto Clemente Coliseum (8,002); San Juan, PR
11/28/2014*; 12:00 pm, SECN		New Orleans	W 87–65	4–1	16 – Allen	6 – Space	9 – Robinson	Reed Arena (5,281); College Station, TX
12/03/2014*; 7:00 pm		Sam Houston State	W 66–63	5–1	13 – Roberson	8 – Roberson	3 – Tied	Reed Arena (4,746); College Station, TX
12/06/2014*; 8:00 pm, SECN		Arizona State	W 72–71	6–1	23 – Caruso	6 – Caruso	6 – Caruso	Reed Arena (6,299); College Station, TX
12/09/2014*; 8:00 pm, ESPN2		at Baylor	L 63–77	6–2	11 – Roberson, Robinson	4 – House	7 – Caruso	Ferrell Center (7,265); Waco, TX
12/13/2014*; 4:00 pm		Youngstown State	W 81–63	7–2	27 – Jones	8 – Jones	10 – Robinson	Reed Arena (7,065); College Station, TX
12/20/2014*; 6:00 pm, ESPNU		vs. Kansas State; Wichita Wildcat Classic	L 64–71	7–3	13 – House, Roberson	6 – Caruso	6 – Caruso	Intrust Bank Arena (14,884); Wichita, KS
12/30/2014*; 7:00 pm, SECN		Mercer	W 65–50	8–3	20 – Jones	8 – Jones	8 – Caruso	Reed Arena (7,052); College Station, TX
01/03/2015*; 4:00 pm		Hartford	W 58–49	9–3	12 – Jones	8 – Caruso	10 – Caruso	Reed Arena (6,325); College Station, TX
Conference games
01/06/2015; 8:00 pm, SECN		at Alabama	L 44–65	9–4 (0–1)	13 – Allen	8 – Miller	6 – Caruso	Coleman Coliseum (10,264); Tuscaloosa, AL
01/10/2015; 12:00 pm, CBS		No. 1 Kentucky	L 64–70 ^{2OT}	9–5 (0–2)	25 – House	10 – Caruso	3 – Caruso	Reed Arena (10,411); College Station, TX
01/13/2015; 8:00 pm, SECN		Mississippi State	W 74–70	10–5 (1–2)	21 – Caruso	9 – Caruso	4 – Green	Reed Arena (4,804); College Station, TX
01/17/2015; 11:00 am, ESPN2		at LSU	W 67–64	11–5 (2–2)	18 – House, Jones	9 – Jones	6 – Robinson	Maravich Center (10,278); Baton Rouge, LA
01/21/2015; 6:00 pm, SECN		Missouri	W 62–50	12–5 (3–2)	16 – House, Jones	9 – Jones	3 – Caruso	Reed Arena (6,849); College Station, TX
01/24/2015; 12:00 pm, FSN		at Tennessee	W 67–61	13–5 (4–2)	18 – Jones	9 – Jones	6 – House	Thompson–Boling Arena (16,547); Knoxville, TN
01/27/2015; 8:00 pm, SECN		at Auburn	W 71–61	14–5 (5–2)	22 – House	6 – Roberson	5 – Caruso	Auburn Arena (7,184); Auburn, AL
01/31/2015; 3:30 pm, SECN		Vanderbilt	W 69–58	15–5 (6–2)	15 – Jones	11 – Roberson	10 – Caruso	Reed Arena (12,722); College Station, TX
02/04/2015; 6:00 pm, SECN		at Ole Miss	L 59–69	15–6 (6–3)	13 – Miller, Caruso	11 – Jones	5 – Caruso	Tad Smith Coliseum (7,739); Oxford, MS
02/07/2015; 5:00 pm, ESPNU		at Missouri	W 83–61	16–6 (7–3)	20 – House	5 – Roberson	11 – Caruso	Mizzou Arena (8,970); Columbia, MO
02/11/2015; 6:00 pm, SECN		Georgia	L 53–62	16–7 (7–4)	20 – Caruso	6 – Caruso	4 – Caruso	Reed Arena (6,441); College Station, TX
02/14/2015; 5:30 pm, SECN		Florida	W 63–62	17–7 (8–4)	20 – Roberson	7 – Caruso	9 – Caruso	Reed Arena (9,418); College Station, TX
02/17/2015; 8:00 pm, SECN		LSU	W 68–62	18–7 (9–4)	20 – House	11 – Roberson	5 – Caruso	Reed Arena (6,701); College Station, TX
02/21/2015; 11:00 am, SECN		at South Carolina	W 62–52	19–7 (10–4)	25 – House	10 – Robertson	8 – Caruso	Colonial Life Arena (12,390); Columbia, SC
02/24/2015; 8:00 pm, SECN		at No. 18 Arkansas	L 75–81	19–8 (10–5)	28 – House	13 – Jones	5 – Caruso	Bud Walton Arena (16,117); Fayetteville, AR
02/28/2015; 7:30 pm, SECN		Auburn	W 80–55	20–8 (11–5)	19 – Jones	11 – Roberson	4 – Caruso, House	Reed Arena (9,809); College Station, TX
03/03/2015; 8:00 pm, ESPNU		at Florida	L 62–66	20–9 (11–6)	20 – Caruso	9 – Jones	4 – Roberson	O'Connell Center (8,591); Gainesville, FL
03/07/2015; 1:00 pm, FSN		Alabama	L 60–61	20–10 (11–7)	13 – Green, Jones	9 – Jones	4 – Caruso	Reed Arena (9,064); College Station, TX
SEC tournament
03/12/2015; 2:30 pm, SECN		vs. Auburn; Second round	L 59–66	20–11	11 – Caruso, Robinson	12 – Roberson	4 – Caruso, Robinson	Bridgestone Arena (10,563); Nashville, TN
NIT
03/17/2015*; 8:00 pm, ESPNU	No. (2)	(7) Montana; First round	W 81–64	21–11	25 – Jones	8 – Jones, Roberson	6 – Green	Reed Arena (2,583); College Station, TX
03/23/2015*; 6:00 pm, ESPN	No. (2)	(3) Louisiana Tech; Second round	L 72–84	21–12	21 – Robinson	8 – Roberson	5 – Caruso, Robinson	Reed Arena (3,859); College Station, TX
*Non-conference game. ^{#}Rankings from AP Poll. (#) Tournament seedings in parentheses. All times are in Central Time. (#) during NIT is seed within region.
