= 2014–15 Arkansas Razorbacks men's basketball team =

American college basketball season

2014–15 Arkansas Razorbacks men's basketball

NCAA tournament, Round of 32
- Conference: Southeastern Conference

Ranking
- Coaches: No. 20
- AP: No. 21
- Record: 27–9 (13–5 SEC)
- Head coach: Mike Anderson (4th season)
- Associate head coach: Melvin Watkins
- Assistant coaches: T. J. Cleveland; Matt Zimmerman
- Home arena: Bud Walton Arena

2014–15 Southeastern Conference men's basketball standings
	Conf.				Overall
Team	W		L	PCT	W		L	PCT
No. 1 Kentucky †	18	–	0	1.000	38	–	1	.974
No. 21 Arkansas	13	–	5	.722	27	–	9	.750
LSU	11	–	7	.611	22	–	11	.667
Georgia	11	–	7	.611	21	–	12	.636
Texas A&M	11	–	7	.611	21	–	12	.636
Ole Miss	11	–	7	.611	21	–	13	.618
Vanderbilt	9	–	9	.500	21	–	14	.600
Alabama	8	–	10	.444	19	–	15	.559
Florida	8	–	10	.444	16	–	17	.485
Tennessee	7	–	11	.389	16	–	16	.500
South Carolina	6	–	12	.333	17	–	16	.515
Mississippi State	6	–	12	.333	13	–	19	.406
Auburn	4	–	14	.222	15	–	20	.429
Missouri	3	–	15	.167	9	–	23	.281
† 2015 SEC tournament winner Rankings from AP poll

The 2014–15 Arkansas Razorbacks men's basketball team represented the University of Arkansas in the 2014–15 NCAA Division I men's basketball season. The team's head coach was Mike Anderson. The team played their home games at Bud Walton Arena in Fayetteville, Arkansas, as a member of the SEC. They finished the season 27–9, 13–5 in SEC play to finish in second place. They advanced to the championship game of the SEC tournament where they lost to Kentucky. They received an at-large bid to the NCAA tournament where they defeated Wofford in the round of 64 before losing to North Carolina in the round of 32.

== Preseason ==
Coach Mike Anderson completed his third season by posting a 22-12 record during the 2013-14 season, where the Razorbacks finished fifth in the SEC. The Razorbacks participated in the NIT, where they defeated Indiana State at home before losing to California on the road.

=== Incoming class ===
College recruiting information
Name	Hometown	School	Height	Weight	Commit date
Anton Beard; G	Little Rock, Arkansas	North Little Rock High School	5 ft 11 in (1.80 m)	180 lb (82 kg)	Apr 22, 2013
Anton Beard; G	Recruit ratings: Scout: Rivals: 247Sports: ESPN:				
Nick Babb; G	Arlington, Texas	Martin High School (Arlington, Texas)	6 ft 4 in (1.93 m)	180 lb (82 kg)	Aug 10, 2013
Nick Babb; G	Recruit ratings: Scout: Rivals: 247Sports: ESPN:				
Trey Thompson; F	Forrest City, Arkansas	Forrest City High School	6 ft 9 in (2.06 m)	250 lb (110 kg)	May 23, 2013
Trey Thompson; F	Recruit ratings: Scout: Rivals: 247Sports: ESPN:				
Overall recruit ranking:
Note: In many cases, Scout, Rivals, 247Sports, On3, and ESPN may conflict in their listings of height and weight.; In these cases, the average was taken. ESPN grades are on a 100-point scale.; Sources: "ESPN". ESPN.; "2014 Team Ranking". Rivals.

== Roster ==
2014–15 Arkansas Razorbacks men's basketball team
Players
Coaches

Pos.	#	Name	Height	Weight	Year	Hometown
G	00	Rashad Madden	6 ft 5 in (1.96 m)	180 lb (82 kg)	Sr	Lepanto, Arkansas
F	1	Trey Thompson	6 ft 9 in (2.06 m)	270 lb (122 kg)	Fr	Madison, Arkansas
G	2	Alandise Harris	6 ft 6 in (1.98 m)	237 lb (108 kg)	RS Sr	Little Rock, Arkansas
G	3	Dusty Hannahs (redshirt)	6 ft 3 in (1.91 m)	208 lb (94 kg)	Jr	Little Rock, Arkansas
G	4	Jabril Durham	6 ft 1 in (1.85 m)	190 lb (86 kg)	Jr	DeSoto, Texas
G	5	Anthlon Bell	6 ft 3 in (1.91 m)	188 lb (85 kg)	Jr	Bartlett, Tennessee
F	10	Bobby Portis	6 ft 11 in (2.11 m)	242 lb (110 kg)	So	Little Rock, Arkansas
G	14	Nick Babb	6 ft 4 in (1.93 m)	185 lb (84 kg)	Fr	Arlington, Texas
G	21	Manuale Watkins	6 ft 3 in (1.91 m)	208 lb (94 kg)	So	Fayetteville, Arkansas
F	22	JaCorey Williams	6 ft 8 in (2.03 m)	218 lb (99 kg)	Jr	Birmingham, Alabama
G	24	Michael Qualls	6 ft 6 in (1.98 m)	210 lb (95 kg)	Jr	Shreveport, Louisiana
G	31	Anton Beard	6 ft 0 in (1.83 m)	190 lb (86 kg)	Fr	North Little Rock, Arkansas
C	33	Moses Kingsley	6 ft 10 in (2.08 m)	230 lb (104 kg)	So	Abuja, Nigeria
F	55	Keaton Miles	6 ft 7 in (2.01 m)	217 lb (98 kg)	RS Jr	Dallas, Texas

Head coach

- Mike Anderson (Tulsa)

Assistant coach(es)

- Melvin Watkins (Charlotte)
- T. J. Cleveland (Arkansas)
- Matt Zimmerman (Arkansas)

Legend

- (C) Team captain
- (S) Suspended
- (I) Ineligible
- (W) Walk-on
- Injured
- Current redshirt

Roster
Last update: 2014-08-03

== Schedule and results ==
Date time, TV	Rank^{#}	Opponent^{#}	Result	Record	High points	High rebounds	High assists	Site (attendance) city, state
Exhibition
11/07/2014*; 7:00 pm		Central Oklahoma	W 110–74		17 – Qualls	7 – Portis	4 – Tied	Bud Walton Arena (14,378); Fayetteville, AR
11/13/2014*; 7:00 pm		Pittsburg State	W 89–66		22 – Portis	5 – Tied	4 – Durham	Bud Walton Arena (14,230); Fayetteville, AR
Non-conference regular season
11/16/2014*; 4:00 pm		Alabama State	W 97–79	1–0	24 – Portis	6 – Harris	6 – Tied	Bud Walton Arena (14,318); Fayetteville, AR
11/19/2014*; 8:00 pm, SECN		Wake Forest; Roundball Showcase	W 83–53	2–0	11 – Madden	7 – Portis	6 – Durham	Bud Walton Arena (14,574); Fayetteville, AR
11/21/2014*; 7:00 pm		Delaware State; Roundball Showcase	W 99–71	3–0	20 – Qualls	7 – Beard	8 – Madden	Bud Walton Arena (14,740); Fayetteville, AR
11/25/2014*; 6:30 pm, ESPNews	No. 25	at SMU	W 78–72	4–0	22 – Portis	5 – Tied	5 – Madden	Moody Coliseum (7,086); Dallas, TX
11/28/2014*; 8:00 pm, SECN	No. 25	North Texas; Roundball Showcase	W 89–73	5–0	22 – Qualls	9 – Qualls	7 – Madden	Bud Walton Arena (14,885); Fayetteville, AR
11/30/2014*; 2:30 pm, SECN	No. 25	Iona; Roundball Showcase	W 94–77	6–0	20 – Tied	9 – Tied	7 – Madden	Bud Walton Arena (14,618); Fayetteville, AR
12/04/2014*; 8:00 pm, ESPN2	No. 18	at No. 20 Iowa State; Big 12/SEC Challenge	L 77–95	6–1	19 – Portis	8 – Portis	5 – Tied	Hilton Coliseum (14,384); Ames, IA
12/07/2014*; 4:00 pm, ESPNU	No. 18	at Clemson	L 65–68 ^{OT}	6–2	21 – Qualls	7 – Portis	5 – Madden	Littlejohn Coliseum (6,764); Clemson, SC
12/13/2014*; 1:00 pm, ESPN2		Dayton	W 69–55	7–2	18 – Portis	9 – Portis	4 – Williams	Bud Walton Arena (15,313); Fayetteville, AR
12/20/2014*; 7:30 pm, SECN		vs. Southeast Missouri State	W 84–67	8–2	24 – Portis	9 – Portis	4 – Tied	Verizon Arena (11,375); Little Rock, AR
12/22/2014*; 8:00 pm, ESPNU		Milwaukee	W 84–54	9–2	18 – Portis	10 – Portis	6 – Madden	Bud Walton Arena (15,018); Fayetteville, AR
12/28/2014*; 2:30 pm, SECN		Northwestern State	W 100–92	10–2	28 – Qualls	12 – Portis	8 – Madden	Bud Walton Arena (15,738); Fayetteville, AR
01/03/2015*; 2:00 pm, SECN		Utah Valley	W 79–46	11–2	17 – Harris	9 – Tied	5 – Madden	Bud Walton Arena (15,410); Fayetteville, AR
SEC regular season
01/06/2015; 6:00 pm, ESPN	No. 23	at Georgia	W 79–75	12–2 (1–0)	21 – Portis	7 – Qualls	3 – Madden	Stegeman Coliseum (7,937); Athens, GA
01/10/2015; 3:30 pm, SECN	No. 23	Vanderbilt	W 82–70	13–2 (2–0)	32 – Portis	11 – Portis	6 – Madden	Bud Walton Arena (17,238); Fayetteville, AR
01/13/2015; 6:00 pm, ESPNU	No. 19	at Tennessee	L 69–74	13–3 (2–1)	17 – Portis	11 – Portis	7 – Madden	Thompson–Boling Arena (13,366); Knoxville, TN
01/17/2015; 8:30 pm, ESPNU	No. 19	Ole Miss	L 82–96	13–4 (2–2)	23 – Portis	10 – Portis	3 – Tied	Bud Walton Arena (19,200); Fayetteville, AR
01/22/2015; 6:00 pm, ESPN2		Alabama	W 93–91 ^{OT}	14–4 (3–2)	30 – Qualls	13 – Portis	3 – Tied	Bud Walton Arena (15,032); Fayetteville, AR
01/24/2015; 1:00 pm, ESPN2		at Missouri	W 61–60	15–4 (4–2)	14 – Harris	10 – Portis	3 – Madden	Mizzou Arena (11,022); Columbia, MO
01/27/2015; 8:00 pm, ESPNU		Tennessee	W 69–64	16–4 (5–2)	17 – Tied	8 – Portis	4 – Qualls	Bud Walton Arena (14,297); Fayetteville, AR
01/31/2015; Noon, CBS		at Florida	L 56–57	16–5 (5–3)	21 – Portis	10 – Portis	3 – Madden	O'Connell Center (11,861); Gainesville, FL
02/03/2015; 8:00 pm, SECN		South Carolina	W 75–55	17–5 (6–3)	18 – Portis	13 – Portis	5 – Madden	Bud Walton Arena (14,846); Fayetteville, AR
02/07/2015; 3:00 pm, SECN		Mississippi State	W 61–41	18–5 (7–3)	19 – Portis	11 – Portis	4 – Madden	Bud Walton Arena (18,283); Fayetteville, AR
02/10/2015; 8:00 pm, ESPNU	No. 24	at Auburn	W 101–87	19–5 (8–3)	22 – Portis	8 – Portis	8 – Madden	Auburn Arena (6,526); Auburn, AL
02/14/2015; 8:00 pm, SECN	No. 24	at Ole Miss	W 71–70	20–5 (9–3)	15 – Qualls	9 – Qualls	6 – Madden	Tad Smith Coliseum (8,719); Oxford, MS
02/18/2015; 8:00 pm, SECN	No. 18	Missouri	W 84–69	21–5 (10–3)	21 – Qualls	9 – Portis	5 – Beard	Bud Walton Arena (15,740); Fayetteville, AR
02/21/2015; 3:00 pm, FSN	No. 18	at Mississippi State	W 65–61	22–5 (11–3)	16 – Madden	9 – Portis	2 – Tied	Humphrey Coliseum (6,254); Starkville, MS
02/24/2015; 8:00 pm, ESPN	No. 18	Texas A&M	W 81–75	23–5 (12–3)	22 – Portis	5 – Tied	5 – Madden	Bud Walton Arena (16,117); Fayetteville, AR
02/28/2015; 3:00 pm, CBS	No. 18	at No. 1 Kentucky	L 67–84	23–6 (12–4)	17 – Qualls	9 – Qualls	3 – Madden	Rupp Arena (24,416); Lexington, KY
03/05/2015; 6:00 pm, ESPN2	No. 18	at South Carolina	W 78–74	24–6 (13–4)	24 – Portis	8 – Portis	9 – Madden	Colonial Life Arena (10,065); Columbia, SC
03/07/2015; 1:00 pm, ESPN	No. 18	LSU	L 78–81	24–7 (13–5)	21 – Portis	15 – Portis	5 – Madden	Bud Walton Arena (18,966); Fayetteville, AR
SEC Tournament
03/13/2015; 6:00 pm, SECN	No. 21	vs. Tennessee; Quarterfinals	W 80–72	25–7	26 – Portis	11 – Portis	5 – Beard	Bridgestone Arena (13,135); Nashville, TN
03/14/2015; Noon, ESPN	No. 21	vs. Georgia; Semifinals	W 60–49	26–7	15 – Qualls	12 – Portis	3 – Babb	Bridgestone Arena (19,232); Nashville, TN
03/15/2015; Noon, ESPN	No. 21	vs. No. 1 Kentucky; Championship Game	L 63–78	26–8	18 – Qualls	4 – Madden	2 – Madden	Bridgestone Arena (20,315); Nashville, TN
NCAA tournament
03/19/2015*; 8:50 pm, TNT	(5 W) No. 21	vs. (12 W) Wofford; First Round	W 56–53	27–8	20 – Qualls	13 – Portis	5 – Madden	Veterans Memorial Arena (12,761); Jacksonville, FL
03/21/2015*; 7:40 pm, TNT	(5 W) No. 21	vs. (4 W) No. 15 North Carolina; Second Round	L 78–87	27–9	27 – Qualls	14 – Portis	5 – Madden	Veterans Memorial Arena (13,687); Jacksonville, FL
*Non-conference game. ^{#}Rankings from AP poll. (#) Tournament seedings in parentheses. W=West Region. All times are in Central Time.

Source: 2014–15 Schedule

== Rankings ==
Ranking movement Legend: ██ Increase in ranking. ██ Decrease in ranking. (RV) Received votes but unranked. (NR) Not ranked.
Poll	Pre	Wk 2	Wk 3	Wk 4	Wk 5	Wk 6	Wk 7	Wk 8	Wk 9	Wk 10	Wk 11	Wk 12	Wk 13	Wk 14	Wk 15	Wk 16	Wk 17	Wk 18	Wk 19	Final
AP	RV	RV	25	18	RV	RV	RV	RV	23	19	RV	RV	RV	24	18	18	18	21	21	N/A
Coaches	RV	RV	RV	21	RV	RV	RV	RV	25	19	RV	25	RV	23	17	16	18	20	20	20
