= 2014–15 Georgia Tech Yellow Jackets men's basketball team =

American college basketball season

2014–15 Georgia Tech Yellow Jackets men's basketball
- Conference: Atlantic Coast Conference
- Record: 12–19 (3–15 ACC)
- Head coach: Brian Gregory (4th season)
- Assistant coaches: Chad Dollar; Mamadou N'Diaye; Tom Herrion
- Home arena: McCamish Pavilion

2014–15 ACC men's basketball standings
	Conf.				Overall
Team	W		L	PCT	W		L	PCT
No. 6 Virginia	16	–	2	.889	30	–	4	.882
No. 4 Duke	15	–	3	.833	35	–	4	.897
No. 8 Notre Dame †	14	–	4	.778	32	–	6	.842
No. 15 North Carolina	11	–	7	.611	26	–	12	.684
Miami (FL)	10	–	8	.556	25	–	13	.658
NC State	10	–	8	.556	22	–	14	.611
Syracuse	9	–	9	.500	18	–	13	.581
Clemson	8	–	10	.444	16	–	15	.516
Florida State	8	–	10	.444	17	–	16	.515
Pittsburgh	8	–	10	.444	19	–	15	.559
Wake Forest	5	–	13	.278	13	–	19	.406
Boston College	4	–	14	.222	13	–	19	.406
Georgia Tech	3	–	15	.167	12	–	19	.387
Virginia Tech	2	–	16	.111	11	–	22	.333
No. 17 Louisville*	0	–	6	.000	0	–	8	.000
† ACC tournament winner Rankings from AP poll *Louisville: 24 reg. season games, 4 postseason games vacated due to sanctions against the program; Disputed Record-(27-9)(12-6)

The 2014–15 Georgia Tech Yellow Jackets men's basketball team represented the Georgia Institute of Technology during the 2014–15 NCAA Division I men's basketball season. They were led by fourth year head coach Brian Gregory and played their home games at McCamish Pavilion. They were members of the Atlantic Coast Conference. They finished the season 12–19, 3–15 in ACC play to finish in fourteenth place. They lost in the first round of the ACC tournament to Boston College.

== Last season ==
The Yellow Jackets finished the season 16–17, 6–12 in ACC play to finish in a three-way tie for 11th place. They advanced to the second round of the ACC tournament where they lost to Clemson.

=== Departures ===
Name	Number	Pos.	Height	Weight	Year	Hometown	Notes
Stacey Poole, Jr.	1	G	6'4"	199	Junior	Jacksonville, FL	Graduated early
Solomon Poole	2	G	6'0"	190	Sophomore	Jacksonville, FL	Kicked off the team; transferred to Florida Atlantic
Robert Carter Jr.	4	F	6'8"	247	Sophomore	Thomasville, GA	Transferred to Maryland
Daniel Miller	5	C	6'11"	275	Senior	Loganville, GA	Graduated
Jason Morris	14	G/F	6'5"	231	Senior	Augusta, GA	Graduated
Trae Golden	23	G	6'2"	205	Senior	Powder Springs, GA	Graduated
Kammeon Holsey	24	F	6'8"	234	Senior	Sparta, GA	Graduated

=== Incoming transfers ===
Name	Number	Pos.	Height	Weight	Year	Hometown	Previous School
Charles Mitchell	0	F	6'7"	260	Junior	Atlanta, GA	Transferred from Maryland. Mitchell will be eligible the 2014–15 season in January. Will have 1.5 years of remaining eligibility.
Demarco Cox	4	C	6'8"	276	Senior	Yazoo City, MS	Elected to transfer from Ole Miss. Will be eligible to play immediately since Cox graduated from Mississippi.
Josh Heath	11	G	6'2"	165	Sophomore	Tampa, FL	Transferred from South Florida. Heath will be eligible the 2014–15 season in January. Will have 2.5 years of remaining eligibility.
Nick Jacobs	54	F	6'8"	265	Senior	Atlanta, GA	Transferred from Alabama. Under NCAA transfer rules, Jacobs will have to redshirt from the 2014–15 season. Will have one year of remaining eligibility.

== Recruiting ==
College recruiting information
Name	Hometown	School	Height	Weight	Commit date
Tadric Jackson; SG	Tifton, GA	Tift County High School	6 ft 2 in (1.88 m)	200 lb (91 kg)	Aug 14, 2013
Tadric Jackson; SG	Recruit ratings: Scout: Rivals: 247Sports: ESPN:				
Ben Lammers; C	San Antonio, TX	Alamo Heights High School	6 ft 10 in (2.08 m)	220 lb (100 kg)	Sep 25, 2013
Ben Lammers; C	Recruit ratings: Scout: Rivals: 247Sports: ESPN:				
A.D. Gueye; PF	Birmingham, AL	Central Park Christian High School	6 ft 10 in (2.08 m)	220 lb (100 kg)	Apr 17, 2014
A.D. Gueye; PF	Recruit ratings: Scout: Rivals: 247Sports: ESPN:				
Overall recruit ranking:
Note: In many cases, Scout, Rivals, 247Sports, On3, and ESPN may conflict in their listings of height and weight.; In these cases, the average was taken. ESPN grades are on a 100-point scale.; Sources: "2014 Team Ranking". Rivals.

== Roster ==
2014–15 Georgia Tech Yellow Jackets men's basketball team
Players
Coaches

Pos.	#	Name	Height	Weight	Year	Hometown
F	0	Charles Mitchell	6 ft 8 in (2.03 m)	260 lb (118 kg)	Jr	Marietta, Georgia
G	1	Tadric Jackson	6 ft 2 in (1.88 m)	220 lb (100 kg)	Fr	Tifton, Georgia
G	2	Chris Bolden	6 ft 3 in (1.91 m)	216 lb (98 kg)	Jr	Tifton, Georgia
G/F	3	Marcus Georges-Hunt	6 ft 5 in (1.96 m)	219 lb (99 kg)	Jr	College Park, Georgia
C	4	Demarco Cox	6 ft 8 in (2.03 m)	276 lb (125 kg)	Sr	Yazoo City, Mississippi
G	5	Corey Heyward	6 ft 1 in (1.85 m)	221 lb (100 kg)	RS So	Duluth, Georgia
G	10	Travis Jorgenson	6 ft 0 in (1.83 m)	177 lb (80 kg)	RS Fr	Columbia, Missouri
G	11	Josh Heath	6 ft 2 in (1.88 m)	165 lb (75 kg)	So	Tampa, Florida
F	12	Quinton Stephens	6 ft 8 in (2.03 m)	184 lb (83 kg)	So	Atlanta, Georgia
G	30	Bernard Woodside (W)	6 ft 0 in (1.83 m)	181 lb (82 kg)	Fr	Tampa, Florida
G/F	31	Aaron Peak	6 ft 4 in (1.93 m)	188 lb (85 kg)	Sr	Atlanta, Georgia
G	32	Brooks Doyle	6 ft 4 in (1.93 m)	199 lb (90 kg)	Jr	Atlanta, Georgia
F	34	Abdoulaye Gueye	6 ft 10 in (2.08 m)	211 lb (96 kg)	Fr	Dakar, Senegal
G	35	Patrick Lamar (W)	6 ft 0 in (1.83 m)	192 lb (87 kg)	Fr	Marietta, Georgia
G	41	Collin Gurry	6 ft 1 in (1.85 m)	183 lb (83 kg)	Jr	Canton, Connecticut
F	42	Rand Rowland	6 ft 6 in (1.98 m)	208 lb (94 kg)	So	Cleveland, Georgia
G	43	Ron Wamer	6 ft 2 in (1.88 m)	190 lb (86 kg)	Jr	Dacula, Georgia
C	44	Ben Lammers	6 ft 10 in (2.08 m)	235 lb (107 kg)	Fr	San Antonio, TX
F	54	Nick Jacobs (redshirt)	6 ft 8 in (2.03 m)	245 lb (111 kg)	Sr	Atlanta, Georgia

Head coach

- Brian Gregory (Oakland)

Assistant coach(es)

- Chad Dollar (South Florida)
- Mamadou N'Diaye (Auburn)
- Tom Herrion (Merrimack)

Legend

- (C) Team captain
- (S) Suspended
- (I) Ineligible
- (W) Walk-on
- Injured
- Current redshirt

Roster

== Schedule ==
Date time, TV	Rank^{#}	Opponent^{#}	Result	Record	Site (attendance) city, state
Exhibition
11/07/2014*; 7:00 pm		Clayton State	W 74–41	0–0	Hank McCamish Pavilion (2,122); Atlanta, GA
Non-conference regular season
11/14/2014*; 7:00 pm, RSN		Georgia	W 80–73	1–0	Hank McCamish Pavilion (8,127); Atlanta, GA
11/18/2014*; 7:00 pm, ESPN3		Alabama A&M	W 66–46	2–0	Hank McCamish Pavilion (4,722); Atlanta, GA
11/21/2014*; 7:00 pm, ESPN3		IPFW	W 78–69	3–0	Hank McCamish Pavilion (5,297); Atlanta, GA
11/27/2014*; 8:30 pm, ESPN2		vs. Marquette; Orlando Classic Quarterfinals	L 70–72	3–1	HP Field House (3,216); Lake Buena Vista, FL
11/28/2014*; 6:30 pm, ESPNU		vs. Rider; Orlando Classic Consolation	W 61–54	4–1	HP Field House (2,554); Lake Buena Vista, FL
11/30/2014*; 6:30 pm, ESPNU		vs. Rhode Island; Orlando Classic 5th Place	W 64–61	5–1	HP Field House (4,842); Lake Buena Vista, FL
12/03/2014*; 9:15 pm, ESPNU		at Northwestern; ACC–Big Ten Challenge	W 66–58	6–1	Welsh-Ryan Arena (6,133); Evanston, IL
12/06/2014*; 2:00 pm, RSN		USC Upstate	L 54–59	6–2	Hank McCamish Pavilion (4,901); Atlanta, GA
12/15/2014*; 7:00 pm, ESPN3		Appalachian State	W 70–57	7–2	Hank McCamish Pavilion (4,961); Atlanta, GA
12/20/2014*; 2:00 pm, ESPN3		Vanderbilt	W 65–60	8–2	Hank McCamish Pavilion (6,081); Atlanta, GA
12/23/2014*; 8:00 pm, CBSSN		at Dayton	L 61–75	8–3	UD Arena (12,424); Dayton, OH
12/30/2014*; 7:00 pm, ESPN3		Charlotte	W 67–66	9–3	Hank McCamish Pavilion (5,567); Atlanta, GA
ACC regular season
01/03/2015; 2:30 pm, ACCN		at No. 14 Notre Dame	L 76–83 ^{2OT}	9–4 (0–1)	Edmund P. Joyce Center (7,582); South Bend, IN
01/07/2015; 7:00 pm, ESPNU		Syracuse	L 45–46	9–5 (0–2)	Hank McCamish Pavilion (7,831); Atlanta, GA
01/10/2015; 12:00 pm, ACCN		at Wake Forest	L 69–76	9–6 (0–3)	LJVM Coliseum (11,514); Winston-Salem, NC
01/14/2015; 7:00 pm, RSN		No. 12 Notre Dame	L 59–62	9–7 (0–4)	Hank McCamish Pavilion (7,282); Atlanta, GA
01/17/2015; 4:00 pm, ACCN		at Pittsburgh	L 65–70	9–8 (0–5)	Peterson Events Center (12,508); Pittsburgh, PA
01/22/2015; 8:00 pm, ACCN		at No. 2 Virginia	L 28–57	9–9 (0–6)	John Paul Jones Arena (13,809); Charlottesville, VA
01/25/2015; 1:00 pm, RSN		Boston College	L 62–64	9–10 (0–7)	Hank McCamish Pavilion (5,587); Atlanta, GA
01/28/2015; 9:00 pm, RSN		at No. 23 Miami (FL)	W 70–50	10–10 (1–7)	BankUnited Center (5,031); Coral Gables, FL
01/31/2015; 12:00 pm, ACCN		NC State	L 80–81 ^{OT}	10–11 (1–8)	Hank McCamish Pavilion (6,384); Atlanta, GA
02/04/2015; 7:00 pm, ESPN2		at No. 4 Duke	L 66–72	10–12 (1–9)	Cameron Indoor Stadium (9,314); Durham, NC
02/07/2015; 12:00 pm, RSN		Wake Forest	W 73–59	11–12 (2–9)	Hank McCamish Pavilion (6,580); Atlanta, GA
02/09/2015; 12:00 pm, ESPNU		at Virginia Tech	L 63–65	11–13 (2–10)	Cassell Coliseum (5,346); Blacksburg, VA
02/14/2015; 2:30 pm, ACCN		Florida State	L 53–57	11–14 (2–11)	Hank McCamish Pavilion (6,317); Atlanta, GA
02/16/2015; 7:00 pm, ESPNU		Clemson	W 63–52	12–14 (3–11)	Hank McCamish Pavilion (5,653); Atlanta, GA
02/21/2015; 12:00 pm, ACCN		at No. 15 North Carolina	L 60–89	12–15 (3–12)	Dean Smith Center (20,779); Chapel Hill, NC
02/23/2015; 7:00 pm, ESPN		No. 17 Louisville	L 51–52	12–16 (3–13)	Hank McCamish Pavilion (7,009); Atlanta, GA
02/28/2015; 12:00 pm, ACCN		at Clemson	L 63–70 ^{OT}	12–17 (3–14)	Littlejohn Coliseum (8,553); Clemson, SC
03/03/2015; 7:00 pm, ESPNU		No. 19 North Carolina	L 49–81	12–18 (3–15)	Hank McCamish Pavilion (6,913); Atlanta, GA
ACC tournament
03/10/2015; 1:00 pm, ESPN2		vs. Boston College; First Round	L 65–66	12–19	Greensboro Coliseum (N/A); Greensboro, NC
*Non-conference game. ^{#}Rankings from AP Poll. (#) Tournament seedings in parentheses. All times are in Eastern Time.
