= 2014–15 Florida Gators men's basketball team =

American college basketball season

2014–15 Florida Gators men's basketball
- Conference: Southeastern Conference
- Record: 16–17 (8–10 SEC)
- Head coach: Billy Donovan (19th season)
- Assistant coaches: Rashon Burno; Matt McCall; John Pelphrey
- Home arena: O'Connell Center

2014–15 Southeastern Conference men's basketball standings
	Conf.				Overall
Team	W		L	PCT	W		L	PCT
No. 1 Kentucky †	18	–	0	1.000	38	–	1	.974
No. 21 Arkansas	13	–	5	.722	27	–	9	.750
LSU	11	–	7	.611	22	–	11	.667
Georgia	11	–	7	.611	21	–	12	.636
Texas A&M	11	–	7	.611	21	–	12	.636
Ole Miss	11	–	7	.611	21	–	13	.618
Vanderbilt	9	–	9	.500	21	–	14	.600
Alabama	8	–	10	.444	19	–	15	.559
Florida	8	–	10	.444	16	–	17	.485
Tennessee	7	–	11	.389	16	–	16	.500
South Carolina	6	–	12	.333	17	–	16	.515
Mississippi State	6	–	12	.333	13	–	19	.406
Auburn	4	–	14	.222	15	–	20	.429
Missouri	3	–	15	.167	9	–	23	.281
† 2015 SEC tournament winner Rankings from AP poll

The 2014–15 Florida Gators men's basketball team represented the University of Florida in the sport of basketball during the 2014–15 NCAA Division I men's basketball season. The Gators competed in the Southeastern Conference (SEC). They were led by nineteen-year head coach Billy Donovan, and played their home games in the O'Connell Center on the university's Gainesville, Florida campus. They finished the season 16–17, 8–10 in SEC play to finish in a tie for eighth place. They advanced to the quarterfinals of the SEC tournament where they lost to Kentucky.

Gator non-participation in a postseason tournament had been 17 years before. The Gators' 63.7 points-per-game had been their lowest during Billy Donovan's 19-year coaching tenure. After the season, Donovan accepted an offer to coach the NBA's Oklahoma City Thunder. He would leave the Gators as the regular season games' winningest head coach in the program's history and while at the helm coached the Gators to more NCAA tournament appearances, and more SEC championships, than the combined totals of all the other head coaches in the program's history.

== Previous season ==
The Gators finished the 2013–14 season as the SEC regular-season champions with an overall record of 36–3, 18–0 record in conference play, the first SEC team to ever accomplish the feat, after the SEC re-expanded to an 18-game regular-season schedule prior to the 2012–13 season. In doing so, the Gators won their seventh SEC regular season championship, and their third in four seasons. The Gators beat the Kentucky Wildcats 61–60 to claim the SEC Tournament championship. As a No. 1 seed in the 2014 NCAA tournament's South Region, Florida won its four tournament games, defeating 16-seed Albany, 8-seed Pittsburgh, 4-seed UCLA and 11-seed Dayton. The Gators' season ended with a loss to 7-seed, and eventual national champion, UConn in the Final Four.

== Offseason ==
=== Departures ===
Name	Number	Pos.	Height	Weight	Year	Hometown	Notes
Casey Prather	24	G/F	6’6”	212	Senior	Jackson, Tennessee	Graduated
Scottie Wilbekin	5	G	6’2”	176	Senior	Gainesville, Florida	Graduated
Will Yeguete	15	F	6’8”	230	Senior	Bordeaux, France	Graduated
Patric Young	4	C	6’9”	240	Senior	Jacksonville, Florida	Graduated

=== Incoming transfers ===
Name	No.	Pos.	Height	Weight	Year	Hometown	Notes
Jon Horford	21	F	6’10”	250	RS Sr.	Lansing, Michigan	Transfer from Michigan. Younger brother of former Gators and current Atlanta Hawks center Al Horford. Will play in the 2014–15 season.
John Egbunu	15	C	6’10”	245	RS So.	Bauchi, Nigeria	Transfer from South Florida. Will sit out a season and play in 2015–16.

=== Recruiting class ===
College recruiting information
Name	Hometown	School	Height	Weight	Commit date
Zach Hodskins; SG	Alpharetta, GA	Milton High School	6 ft 2 in (1.88 m)	175 lb (79 kg)	Oct 20, 2013
Zach Hodskins; SG	Recruit ratings: Scout: Rivals: 247Sports: (NR)				
Chris Chiozza; PG	Memphis, TN	White Station High School	5 ft 11 in (1.80 m)	160 lb (73 kg)	Aug 17, 2013
Chris Chiozza; PG	Recruit ratings: Scout: Rivals: 247Sports: ESPN:				
Brandone Francis; SG	Jacksonville, FL	Arlington Country Day School	6 ft 5 in (1.96 m)	205 lb (93 kg)	Oct 28, 2013
Brandone Francis; SG	Recruit ratings: Scout: Rivals: 247Sports: ESPN:				
Devin Robinson; SF	Chesterfield, VA	Christchurch School	6 ft 8 in (2.03 m)	180 lb (82 kg)	Nov 15, 2013
Devin Robinson; SF	Recruit ratings: Scout: Rivals: 247Sports: ESPN:				
Overall recruit ranking: Scout: #11 Rivals: #11 ESPN: #13
Note: In many cases, Scout, Rivals, 247Sports, On3, and ESPN may conflict in their listings of height and weight.; In these cases, the average was taken. ESPN grades are on a 100-point scale.; Sources: "2014 Florida Basketball Commits". Scout.; "ESPN". ESPN.; "Scout.com Team Recruiting Rankings". Scout.; "2014 Team Ranking". Rivals.

== Personnel ==
=== Roster ===
2014–15 Florida Gators men's basketball team
Players
Coaches

Pos.	#	Name	Height	Weight	Year	Hometown
G	0	Kasey Hill	6 ft 1 in (1.85 m)	182 lb (83 kg)	So	Umatilla, Florida
G	1	Eli Carter	6 ft 2 in (1.88 m)	200 lb (91 kg)	RS Jr	Paterson, New Jersey
G	2	Brandone Francis (I)	6 ft 5 in (1.96 m)	205 lb (93 kg)	Fr	La Romana, Dominican Republic
F	3	Devin Robinson	6 ft 8 in (2.03 m)	178 lb (81 kg)	Fr	Chesterfield, Virginia
F	5	Alex Murphy	6 ft 8 in (2.03 m)	225 lb (102 kg)	RS Jr	Wakefield, Rhode Island
F	10	Dorian Finney-Smith	6 ft 8 in (2.03 m)	218 lb (99 kg)	RS Jr	Portsmouth, Virginia
G	11	Chris Chiozza	6 ft 0 in (1.83 m)	160 lb (73 kg)	Fr	Memphis, Tennessee
G	14	Lexx Edwards (W)	6 ft 2 in (1.88 m)	220 lb (100 kg)	RS Jr	Orlando, Florida
C	15	John Egbunu (redshirt)	6 ft 11 in (2.11 m)	266 lb (121 kg)	So	Bauchi, Nigeria
G	20	Michael Frazier II	6 ft 4 in (1.93 m)	194 lb (88 kg)	Jr	Tampa, Florida
F	21	Jon Horford	6 ft 10 in (2.08 m)	245 lb (111 kg)	RS Sr	Grand Ledge, Michigan
F	23	Chris Walker	6 ft 10 in (2.08 m)	220 lb (100 kg)	So	Bonifay, Florida
G	20	Michael Keller (W)	6 ft 1 in (1.85 m)	203 lb (92 kg)	Fr	Tampa, Florida
G/F	25	DeVon Walker (injured)	6 ft 6 in (1.98 m)	203 lb (92 kg)	Jr	Winter Haven, Florida
F	30	Jacob Kurtz (W)	6 ft 6 in (1.98 m)	210 lb (95 kg)	Sr	Oviedo, Florida
G	42	William Donovan III (W)	6 ft 2 in (1.88 m)	192 lb (87 kg)	RS Sr	Gainesville, Florida

Head coach

- Billy Donovan (19th year)

Assistant coach(es)

- Rashon Burno (3rd year)
- Matt McCall (4th year)
- John Pelphrey (4th year)

Legend

- (C) Team captain
- (S) Suspended
- (I) Ineligible
- (W) Walk-on
- Injured
- Current redshirt

Roster
Last update: November 27, 2014

Notes

- During the season, sophomore guard Dillon Graham transferred from Florida to Embry–Riddle.

=== Coaches ===
Name	Position	College	Graduating year
Billy Donovan	Head coach	Providence College	1987
Matt McCall	Associate head coach	University of Florida	2005
John Pelphrey	Assistant coach	University of Kentucky	1992
Rashon Burno	Assistant coach	DePaul University	2002
Darren Hertz	Assistant to the head coach	University of Florida	1997
Oliver Winterbone	Video coordinator	Rutgers University	2005
Preston Greene	Strength and conditioning coordinator	Clemson University	1999
Dave Werner	Athletic Trainer	Eastern Kentucky University	1991
Tom Williams	Academic Counselor	University of Florida	1978

== Schedule and results ==
Date time, TV	Rank^{#}	Opponent^{#}	Result	Record	Site (attendance) city, state
Exhibition
Nov. 6, 2014*; 7:00 p.m.	No. 7	Barry	W 79–70	–	O'Connell Center (9,016); Gainesville, FL
Regular season (non-conference play)
Nov. 14, 2014*; 6:00 p.m., SECN	No. 7	William & Mary	W 68–45	1–0	O'Connell Center (10,861); Gainesville, FL
Nov. 17, 2014*; 7:00 p.m., ESPNU	No. 8	Miami (FL)	L 67–69	1–1	O'Connell Center (11,156); Gainesville, FL
Nov. 21, 2014*; 8:00 p.m., SECN	No. 8	Louisiana–Monroe; Battle 4 Atlantis opening round	W 61–56 ^{OT}	2–1	O'Connell Center (11,003); Gainesville, FL
Nov. 26, 2014*; 9:30 p.m., AXS TV	No. 18	vs. Georgetown; Battle 4 Atlantis quarterfinals	L 65–66 ^{OT}	2–2	Imperial Arena (3,240); Nassau, Bahamas
Nov. 27, 2014*; 9:30 p.m., AXS TV	No. 18	vs. UAB; Battle 4 Atlantis consolation round	W 56–47	3–2	Imperial Arena (2,408); Nassau, Bahamas
Nov. 28, 2014*; 8:00 p.m., AXS TV	No. 18	vs. No. 5 North Carolina; Battle 4 Atlantis 5th place game	L 64–75	3–3	Imperial Arena (3,298); Nassau, Bahamas
Dec. 5, 2014*; 9:00 p.m., ESPN		at No. 11 Kansas; Big 12/SEC Challenge	L 65–71	3–4	Allen Fieldhouse (16,300); Lawrence, KS
Dec. 8, 2014*; 7:00 p.m., SECN		Yale	W 85–47	4–4	O'Connell Center (8,711); Gainesville, FL
Dec. 12, 2014*; 7:00 p.m., SECN		Texas Southern	W 75–50	5–4	O'Connell Center (9,212); Gainesville, FL
Dec. 14, 2014*; 4:00 p.m., FSN		Jacksonville	W 79–34	6–4	O'Connell Center (10,123); Gainesville, FL
Dec. 20, 2014*; 5:00 p.m., FS1		vs. Wake Forest; Orange Bowl Basketball Classic	W 63–50	7–4	BB&T Center (10,175); Sunrise, FL
Dec 30, 2014*; 7:00 p.m., ESPN2		at Florida State	L 63–65	7–5	Donald L. Tucker Civic Center (8,273); Tallahassee, FL
Jan. 3, 2015*; 2:00 p.m., CBS		UConn	L 59–63	7–6	O'Connell Center (11,041); Gainesville, FL
Regular season (SEC conference play)
Jan. 7, 2015; 7:00 p.m., SECN		at South Carolina	W 72–68	8–6 (1–0)	Colonial Life Arena (12,181); Columbia, SC
Jan. 10, 2015; 7:00 p.m., FSN		Mississippi State	W 72–47	9–6 (2–0)	O'Connell Center (11,966); Gainesville, FL
Jan. 15, 2015; 7:00 p.m., ESPN2		Auburn	W 75–55	10–6 (3–0)	O'Connell Center (10,346); Gainesville, FL
Jan. 17, 2015; 2:00 p.m., CBS		at Georgia	L 61–73	10–7 (3–1)	Stegeman Coliseum (10,523); Athens, GA
Jan. 20, 2015; 7:00 p.m., ESPN		LSU	L 61–79	10–8 (3–2)	O'Connell Center (10,160); Gainesville, FL
Jan. 24, 2015; 8:00 p.m., SECN		at Ole Miss	L 71–72	10–9 (3–3)	Tad Smith Coliseum (8,812); Oxford, MS
Jan. 27, 2015; 9:00 p.m., ESPN		at Alabama	W 52–50	11–9 (4–3)	Coleman Coliseum (10,759); Tuscaloosa, AL
Jan. 31, 2015; 1:00 p.m., CBS		Arkansas	W 57–56	12–9 (5–3)	O'Connell Center (11,861); Gainesville, FL
Feb. 3, 2015; 9:00 p.m., ESPN		at Vanderbilt	L 61–67	12–10 (5–4)	Memorial Gymnasium (9,815); Nashville, TN
Feb. 7, 2015; 9:00 p.m., ESPN		No. 1 Kentucky; Rivalry and ESPN College GameDay	L 61–68	12–11 (5–5)	O'Connell Center (12,578); Gainesville, FL
Feb. 12, 2015; 7:00 p.m., ESPN		Ole Miss	L 61–62	12–12 (5–6)	O'Connell Center (10,291); Gainesville, FL
Feb. 14, 2015; 6:30 p.m., SECN		at Texas A&M	L 62–63	12–13 (5–7)	Reed Arena (9,418); College Station, TX
Feb. 18, 2015; 7:00 p.m., SECN		Vanderbilt	W 50–47	13–13 (6–7)	O'Connell Center (9,417); Gainesville, FL
Feb. 21, 2015; 1:00 p.m., CBS		at LSU	L 63–70	13–14 (6–8)	Maravich Center (9,203); Baton Rouge, LA
Feb. 24, 2015; 9:00 p.m., SECN		at Missouri	L 52–64	13–15 (6–9)	Mizzou Arena (7,631); Columbia, MO
Feb. 28, 2015; 6:00 p.m., ESPN2		Tennessee	W 66–49	14–15 (7–9)	O'Connell Center (11,970); Gainesville, FL
Mar. 3, 2015; 9:00 p.m., ESPNU		Texas A&M	W 66–62	15–15 (8–9)	O'Connell Center (8,591); Gainesville, FL
Mar. 7, 2015; 2:00 p.m., CBS		at No. 1 Kentucky; Rivalry	L 50–67	15–16 (8–10)	Rupp Arena (24,428); Lexington, KY
SEC tournament
Mar. 12, 2015; 1:00 p.m., SECN		vs. Alabama; Second round	W 69–61	16–16	Bridgestone Arena (10,563); Nashville, TN
Mar. 13, 2015; 1:00 p.m., SECN		vs. No. 1 Kentucky; Quarterfinals	L 49–64	16–17	Bridgestone Arena (18,205); Nashville, TN
*Non-conference game. ^{#}Rankings from AP Poll. (#) Tournament seedings in parentheses. All times are in Eastern Time.

== Rankings ==
Ranking movement Legend: ██ Increase in ranking. ██ Decrease in ranking. (RV) Received votes but unranked. (NR) Not ranked.
Poll	Pre	Wk 2	Wk 3	Wk 4	Wk 5	Wk 6	Wk 7	Wk 8	Wk 9	Wk 10	Wk 11	Wk 12	Wk 13	Wk 14	Wk 15	Wk 16	Wk 17	Wk 18	Wk 19	Final
AP	7	8	18	RV	NR	NR	RV	RV	NR	NR	NR	NR	NR	NR	NR	NR	NR	NR	NR	N/A
Coaches	7	7	16	24	RV	RV	RV	NR	NR	NR	NR	NR	NR	NR	NR	NR	NR	NR	NR	NR

== See also ==
- 2014–15 Florida Gators women's basketball team
