= 2015 SEC men's basketball tournament =

- Classification: Division I
- Season: 2014–15
- Teams: 14
- Site: Bridgestone Arena; Nashville, Tennessee
- Champions: Kentucky (29th title)
- Winning coach: John Calipari (3rd title)
- MVP: Willie Cauley-Stein (Kentucky)
- Attendance: 106,521
- Television: ESPN and SEC Network

2014–15 Southeastern Conference men's basketball standings
	Conf.				Overall
Team	W		L	PCT	W		L	PCT
No. 1 Kentucky †	18	–	0	1.000	38	–	1	.974
No. 21 Arkansas	13	–	5	.722	27	–	9	.750
LSU	11	–	7	.611	22	–	11	.667
Georgia	11	–	7	.611	21	–	12	.636
Texas A&M	11	–	7	.611	21	–	12	.636
Ole Miss	11	–	7	.611	21	–	13	.618
Vanderbilt	9	–	9	.500	21	–	14	.600
Alabama	8	–	10	.444	19	–	15	.559
Florida	8	–	10	.444	16	–	17	.485
Tennessee	7	–	11	.389	16	–	16	.500
South Carolina	6	–	12	.333	17	–	16	.515
Mississippi State	6	–	12	.333	13	–	19	.406
Auburn	4	–	14	.222	15	–	20	.429
Missouri	3	–	15	.167	9	–	23	.281
† 2015 SEC tournament winner Rankings from AP poll

The 2015 Southeastern Conference men's basketball tournament was the postseason men's basketball tournament for the Southeastern Conference held at Bridgestone Arena in Nashville, Tennessee from March 11–15, 2015. The tournament consisted of five rounds and included all 14 SEC teams. Seeds 5 through 10 will receive a first-round bye, and the top four seeds will receive a "double bye" through the first round and second round. All games of the tournament were televised by the networks of ESPN, with the first three rounds on the SEC Network.

== Seeds ==
Seed	School	Conference record	Overall record	Tiebreaker
1	Kentucky^{‡†}	18–0	34–0	
2	Arkansas^{†}	13–5	26–8	
3	Georgia^{†}	11–7	21–11	3–1 vs. LSU, Texas A&M, and Ole Miss
4	LSU^{†}	11–7	22–10	3–2 vs. Georgia, Texas A&M, and Ole Miss
5	Texas A&M^{#}	11–7	20–11	2–2 vs. Georgia, LSU, and Ole Miss
6	Ole Miss^{#}	11–7	20–12	1–4 vs. Georgia, LSU, and Texas A&M
7	Vanderbilt^{#}	9–9	19–13	
8	Florida^{#}	8–10	16–17	1–0 vs. Alabama
9	Alabama^{#}	8–10	18–14	0–1 vs. Florida
10	Tennessee^{#}	7–11	16–16	
11	South Carolina	6–12	17–16	1–0 vs. Mississippi State
12	Mississippi State	6–12	13–19	0–1 vs. South Carolina
13	Auburn	4–14	15–20	
14	Missouri	3–15	9–23	
‡ – SEC regular season champions, and tournament No. 1 seed. † – Received a double-bye in the conference tournament. # – Received a single-bye in the conference tournament. Overall records include all games played in the SEC Tournament.

== Schedule ==
Game	Time*	Matchup^{#}	Final score	Television	Attendance
First round – Wednesday, March 11
1	6:00 p.m.	#12 Mississippi State vs. #13 Auburn	68–74	SEC Network	10,039
2	8:30 p.m.	#11 South Carolina vs. #14 Missouri	63–54	SEC Network	10,039
Second round – Thursday, March 12
3	Noon	#8 Florida vs. #9 Alabama	69–61	SEC Network	10,563
4	2:30 p.m.	#5 Texas A&M vs. #13 Auburn	59–66	SEC Network	10,563
5	6:00 p.m.	#7 Vanderbilt vs. #10 Tennessee	61–67	SEC Network	15,032
6	8:30 p.m.	#6 Ole Miss vs. #11 South Carolina	58–60	SEC Network	15,032
Quarterfinals – Friday, March 13
7	Noon	#1 Kentucky vs. #8 Florida	64–49	SEC Network	18,205
8	2:30 p.m.	#4 LSU vs. #13 Auburn	70–73^{OT}	SEC Network	18,205
9	6:00 p.m.	#2 Arkansas vs. #10 Tennessee	80–72	SEC Network	13,135
10	8:30 p.m.	#3 Georgia vs. #11 South Carolina	74–62	SEC Network	13,135
Semifinals – Saturday, March 14
11	Noon	#1 Kentucky vs. #13 Auburn	91–67	ESPN	19,232
12	2:30 p.m.	#2 Arkansas vs. #3 Georgia	60–49	ESPN	19,232
Championship – Sunday, March 15
13	Noon	#1 Kentucky vs. #2 Arkansas	78–63	ESPN	20,315
*Game times in CDT. # – Rankings denote tournament seed

== Bracket ==
First round Wednesday, March 11; SEC Network
12	Mississippi State	68
13	Auburn	74
11	South Carolina	63
14	Missouri	54

Second round Thursday, March 12; SEC Network
8	Florida	69
9	Alabama	61
5	Texas A&M	59
13	Auburn	66
7	Vanderbilt	61
10	Tennessee	67
6	Ole Miss	58
11	South Carolina	60

Quarterfinals; Friday, March 13; SEC Network
1	#1 Kentucky	64
8	Florida	49
4	LSU	70
13	Auburn	73^{OT}
2	#21 Arkansas	80
10	Tennessee	72
3	Georgia	74
11	South Carolina	62

Semifinals; Saturday, March 14; ESPN
1	#1 Kentucky	91
13	Auburn	67
2	#21 Arkansas	60
3	Georgia	49

Championship; Sunday, March 15; ESPN
1	#1 Kentucky	78
2	#21 Arkansas	63

== Game statistics ==
=== First round ===
SEC Network

March 11
6 p.m. CT

Boxscore

Mississippi State 68, Auburn 74
Scoring by half: 36–34, 32–40
Pts: C. Sword, 21; Rebs: C. Sword, 7 Asts: C. Sword, 4	Pts: K. Ross-Miller, 21; Rebs: K. Ross-Miller, 7 Asts: T. Lang, 3

Bridgestone Arena
Attendance: 10,039
Referees: Tony Greene, Joe Lindsay, Mike Nance

SEC Network

March 11
8:30 p.m. CT

Boxscore

South Carolina 63, Missouri 54
Scoring by half: 30–24, 33–30
Pts: S. Thornwell, 18; Rebs: T. Johnson, 7 Asts: S. Thornwell, 6	Pts: M. Gill-Caesar, 10; Rebs: J. Williams III, 11; Asts: K. Shamburger, 4

Bridgestone Arena
Attendance: 10,039
Referees: Anthony Jordan, Doug Shows, Ron Groover

=== Second round ===
SEC Network

March 12
Noon CT

Boxscore

Florida 69, Alabama 61
Scoring by half: 33–29, 36–32
Pts: D. Finney-Smith, 23; Rebs: D. Finney-Smith, 11; Asts: C. Chiozza, 4	Pts: Tied, 15; Rebs: R. Norris, 7 Asts: L. Randolph, 4

Bridgestone Arena
Attendance: 10,563
Referees: Tim Gattis, Ron Groover, Mike Nance

SEC Network

March 12
2:30 p.m. CT

Boxscore

Texas A&M 59, Auburn 66
Scoring by half: 33–23, 26–43
Pts: Tied, 11; Rebs: K. Roberson, 12; Asts: Tied, 4	Pts: K. Harrell, 25; Rebs: C. Bowers, 8 Asts: K. Ross-Miller, 4

Bridgestone Arena
Attendance: 10,563
Referees: Anthony Jordan, Kevin Fehr, Olandis Poole

SEC Network

March 12
6 p.m. CT

Boxscore

Vanderbilt 61, Tennessee 67
Scoring by half: 32–38, 35–23
Pts: D. Jones, 18; Rebs: D. Jones, 15; Asts: W. Baldwin IV, 5	Pts: J. Richardson, 22; Rebs: D. Reese, 7 Asts: K. Punter, 4

Bridgestone Arena
Attendance: 15,032
Referees: Antinio Petty, Tony Henderson, Glenn Tuitt

SEC Network

March 12
8:30 p.m. CT

Boxscore

Ole Miss 58, South Carolina 60
Scoring by half: 27–24, 33–34
Pts: L. White, 17; Rebs: Tied, 7 Asts: S. Moody, 3	Pts: M. Carrera; Rebs: Tied, 7 Asts: T. Johnson, 5

Bridgestone Arena
Attendance: 15,032
Referees: Pat Adams, Joe Lindsay, Lee Cassell

=== Quarterfinals ===
SEC Network

March 13
Noon CT

Boxscore

Kentucky 64, Florida 49
Scoring by half: 31–27, 33–22
Pts: Tied, 13; Rebs: K. Towns, 12; Asts: T. Ulis, 4	Pts: J. Horford, 15; Rebs: D. Finney-Smith, 8 Asts: K. Hill, 4

Bridgestone Arena
Attendance: 18,205
Referees: Tony Greene, Joe Lindsay, Pat Adams

SEC Network

March 13
2:30 p.m. CT

Boxscore

LSU 70, Auburn 73 (OT)
Scoring by half: 28–24, 36–40 Overtime: 6–9
Pts: K. Hornsby, 24; Rebs: J. Martin, 15; Asts: Tied, 3	Pts: K. Harrell, 29; Rebs: C. Bowers, 10; Asts: K. Ross-Miller, 5

Bridgestone Arena
Attendance: 18,205
Referees: Antinio Petty, Lee Cassell, Tim Gattis

SEC Network

March 13
6 p.m. CT

Boxscore

Arkansas 80, Tennessee 72
Scoring by half: 45–25, 35–47
Pts: B. Portis, 26; Rebs: B. Portis, 11; Asts: A. Beard, 5	Pts: J. Richardson, 22; Rebs: J. Richardson, 10; Asts: J. Richardson, 3

Bridgestone Arena
Attendance: 13,135
Referees: Doug Shows, Mike Nance, Patrick Evans

SEC Network

March 13
8:30 p.m. CT

Boxscore

Georgia 74, South Carolina 62
Scoring by half: 33–26, 41–36
Pts: M. Thornton, 15; Rebs: Y. Maten, 10; Asts: C. Mann, 4	Pts: D. Notice, 20; Rebs: M. Carrera, 8 Asts: S. Thornwell, 6

Bridgestone Arena
Attendance: 13,135
Referees: Anthony Jordan, Ron Groover, Tony Henderson

=== Semifinals ===
ESPN

March 14
Noon CDT

Boxscore

Kentucky 91, Auburn 67
Scoring by half: 47–29, 44–38
Pts: W. Cauley-Stein, 18; Rebs: W. Cauley-Stein, 7 Asts: T. Ulis, 6	Pts: A. Mason, 23; Rebs: D. Waddell, 5 Asts: Tied, 1

Bridgestone Arena
Attendance: 19,232
Referees: Mike Nance, Olandis Poole, Doug Shows.

ESPN

March 14
2:30 p.m. CDT

Boxscore

Arkansas 60, Georgia 49
Scoring by half: 25–17, 35–32
Pts: M. Qualls, 15; Rebs: B. Portis, 12; Asts: N. Babb, 3	Pts: Tied, 13; Rebs: M. Thornton, 12; Asts: J.J. Frazier, 4

Bridgestone Arena
Attendance: 19,232
Referees: Lee Cassell, Tony Greene, Antinio Petty.

=== Championship game ===
ESPN

March 15
Noon CDT

Boxscore

Kentucky 78, Arkansas 63
Scoring by half: 41–25, 37–38
Pts: W. Cauley-Stein/An. Harrison, 15; Rebs: W. Cauley-Stein, 10; Asts: Aa. Harrison/T. Ulis, 6	Pts: M. Qualls, 18; Rebs: R. Madden, 4 Asts: R. Madden, 2

Bridgestone Arena
Attendance: 20,315
Referees: Pat Adams, Tony Greene, Doug Shows.

== See also ==
- 2015 SEC women's basketball tournament
