= 2014–15 Ole Miss Rebels men's basketball team =

American college basketball season

2014–15 Ole Miss Rebels men's basketball

Emerald Coast Classic champions

NCAA tournament, round of 64
- Conference: Southeastern Conference
- Record: 21–13 (11–7 SEC)
- Head coach: Andy Kennedy (9th season)
- Assistant coaches: Bill Armstrong; Tony Madlock
- Home arena: Tad Smith Coliseum

2014–15 Southeastern Conference men's basketball standings
	Conf.				Overall
Team	W		L	PCT	W		L	PCT
No. 1 Kentucky †	18	–	0	1.000	38	–	1	.974
No. 21 Arkansas	13	–	5	.722	27	–	9	.750
LSU	11	–	7	.611	22	–	11	.667
Georgia	11	–	7	.611	21	–	12	.636
Texas A&M	11	–	7	.611	21	–	12	.636
Ole Miss	11	–	7	.611	21	–	13	.618
Vanderbilt	9	–	9	.500	21	–	14	.600
Alabama	8	–	10	.444	19	–	15	.559
Florida	8	–	10	.444	16	–	17	.485
Tennessee	7	–	11	.389	16	–	16	.500
South Carolina	6	–	12	.333	17	–	16	.515
Mississippi State	6	–	12	.333	13	–	19	.406
Auburn	4	–	14	.222	15	–	20	.429
Missouri	3	–	15	.167	9	–	23	.281
† 2015 SEC tournament winner Rankings from AP poll

The 2014–15 Ole Miss Rebels men's basketball team represented the University of Mississippi in the 2014–15 NCAA Division I men's basketball season. The team's head coach was Andy Kennedy, in his ninth season at Ole Miss. The team played their home games at the Tad Smith Coliseum in Oxford, Mississippi as a member of the Southeastern Conference. They finished the season 21–13, 11–7 in SEC play to finish in four-way tie for third place. They lost in the second round of the SEC tournament to South Carolina. They received an at-large bid to the NCAA tournament where they defeated BYU in the First Four before losing in the second round to Xavier.

== Before the season ==
=== Departures ===
Name	Number	Pos.	Height	Weight	Year	Hometown	Notes
Jerron Martin	0	G	6'1"	165	Freshman	Prince George's County, MD	Transferred to South Plains College
Derrick Millinghaus	3	G	5'10"	172	Sophomore	Schenectady, NY	Transferred to Southeastern Louisiana
Demarco Cox	4	C	6'8"	276	Junior	Yazoo City, MS	Transferred to Georgia Tech
Cade Peeper	5	G	6'2"	185	Sophomore	Collierville, TN	Left the team
Will Norman	21	G	6'5"	213	RS Junior	Lafayette, LA	Left the team
Marshall Henderson	22	G	6'2"	177	Senior	Hurst, TX	Graduated
Janari Jõesaar	24	F	6'6"	208	Freshman	Tartu, Estonia	Transferred to Texas–Pan American

=== Incoming transfers ===
Name	Number	Pos.	Height	Weight	Year	Hometown	Previous School
Roderick Lawrence	0	G	6'4"	185	Junior	Orlando, FL	Junior college transfer from South Plains College.
Terence Smith	3	G	6'4"	195	Senior	Russellville, AL	Transferred from Tennessee–Martin. Will be eligible to play immediately since Smith graduated from Tennessee–Martin.
M. J. Rhett	4	F	6'9"	235	RS Senior	Columbia, SC	Transferred from Tennessee State. Will be eligible to play immediately since Rhett graduated from Tennessee State.
Stefan Moody	42	G	5'10"	170	Junior	Kissimmee, FL	Junior college transfer from Kilgore College.

=== Recruits ===
College recruiting information
Name	Hometown	School	Height	Weight	Commit date
Marcanvis Hymon; PF	Memphis, TN	Whitehaven	6 ft 7 in (2.01 m)	215 lb (98 kg)	Jul 9, 2013
Marcanvis Hymon; PF	Recruit ratings: Scout: Rivals: 247Sports: ESPN:				
J. T. Escobar; SG	Tallahassee, FL	Florida A&M Developmental Research School	6 ft 2 in (1.88 m)	170 lb (77 kg)	Oct 5, 2013
J. T. Escobar; SG	Recruit ratings: Scout: Rivals: 247Sports: ESPN:				
Rauno Nurger; SF	Bel Aire, KS	Sunrise Christian Academy	6 ft 9 in (2.06 m)	210 lb (95 kg)	Oct 28, 2013
Rauno Nurger; SF	Recruit ratings: Scout: Rivals: 247Sports: ESPN:				
Overall recruit ranking: Scout: Not Ranked Rivals: Not Ranked ESPN: Not Ranked
Note: In many cases, Scout, Rivals, 247Sports, On3, and ESPN may conflict in their listings of height and weight.; In these cases, the average was taken. ESPN grades are on a 100-point scale.; Sources: "Ole Miss 2014 Basketball Commitments". Rivals.; "2014 Ole Miss Basketball Commits". Scout.; "ESPN". ESPN.; "Scout.com Team Recruiting Rankings". Scout.; "2014 Team Ranking". Rivals.

== Roster ==
2014–15 Ole Miss Rebels men's basketball team
Players
Coaches

Pos.	#	Name	Height	Weight	Year	Previous school	Hometown
G	0	Roderick Lawrence	6 ft 5 in (1.96 m)	184 lb (83 kg)	Jr	South Plains College	Orlando, FL
G	1	Martavious Newby	6 ft 3 in (1.91 m)	210 lb (95 kg)	Jr	Booker T. Washington HS	Memphis, TN
G	3	Terence Smith	6 ft 4 in (1.93 m)	195 lb (88 kg)	Sr	Tennessee–Martin	Russellville, AL
F	4	M. J. Rhett	6 ft 9 in (2.06 m)	236 lb (107 kg)	Sr	Tennessee State	Columbia, SC
G	10	LaDarius White	6 ft 6 in (1.98 m)	205 lb (93 kg)	Sr	McComb HS	McComb, MS
F	11	Sebastian Saiz	6 ft 9 in (2.06 m)	233 lb (106 kg)	So	Sunrise Christian Academy	Madrid, Spain
F	13	Anthony Pérez	6 ft 9 in (2.06 m)	205 lb (93 kg)	Jr	Word of Life Traditional School	Cumaná, Venezuela
C	20	John Crnogorac	6 ft 10 in (2.08 m)	216 lb (98 kg)	Fr	Marshall Academy	Sydney, Australia
F	21	Marcanvis Hymon	6 ft 6 in (1.98 m)	207 lb (94 kg)	Fr	Whitehaven HS	Memphis, TN
C	23	Dwight Coleby	6 ft 9 in (2.06 m)	240 lb (109 kg)	So	Piney Woods HS	Nassau, Bahamas
F	25	Terry Brutus	6 ft 6 in (1.98 m)	230 lb (104 kg)	RS So	Massanutten Military Academy	Spring Valley, NY
G	32	Jarvis Summers	6 ft 3 in (1.91 m)	186 lb (84 kg)	Sr	Provine HS	Jackson, MS
F	34	Aaron Jones	6 ft 9 in (2.06 m)	230 lb (104 kg)	Sr	Gautier HS	Gautier, MS
G	42	Stefan Moody	5 ft 10 in (1.78 m)	183 lb (83 kg)	Jr	Kilgore College	Kissimmee, FL

Head coach

- Andy Kennedy (UAB)

Assistant coach(es)

- Bill Armstrong (UAB)
- Tony Madlock (Memphis)

Legend

- (C) Team captain
- (S) Suspended
- (I) Ineligible
- (W) Walk-on
- Injured
- Current redshirt

Roster

== Schedule and results ==
Date time, TV	Rank^{#}	Opponent^{#}	Result	Record	Site (attendance) city, state
Exhibition
11/07/2014*; 7:00 pm		Delta State	W 97–58		Tad Smith Coliseum; Oxford, MS
Non-conference games
11/14/2014*; 6:00 pm		Charleston Southern	L 65–66 ^{OT}	0–1	Tad Smith Coliseum (5,841); Oxford, MS
11/17/2014*; 7:00 pm		at Troy	W 74–64	1–1	Trojan Arena (3,278); Troy, AL
11/20/2014*; 7:00 pm		Southern; Emerald Coast Classic First Round	W 69–38	2–1	Tad Smith Coliseum (5,199); Oxford, MS
11/23/2014*; 7:00 pm, SECN		Northern Arizona; Emerald Coast Classic Second Round	W 80–74	3–1	Tad Smith Coliseum (5,290); Oxford, MS
11/28/2014*; 7:30 pm		vs. No. 23 Creighton; Emerald Coast Classic semifinals	W 75–68	4–1	The Arena at NWFSC (1,600); Niceville, FL
11/29/2014*; 8:00 pm, CBSSN		vs. Cincinnati; Emerald Coast Classic championship	W 66–54	5–1	The Arena at NWFSC (1,550); Niceville, FL
12/04/2014*; 8:00 pm, ESPNU		TCU; Big 12/SEC Challenge	L 54–66	5–2	Tad Smith Coliseum (6,370); Oxford, MS
12/07/2014*; 3:00 pm, FS1		at Oregon	W 79–73	6–2	Matthew Knight Arena (6,256); Eugene, OR
12/13/2014*; 3:30 pm		WKU	L 74–81	6–3	Tad Smith Coliseum (6,692); Oxford, MS
12/18/2014*; 7:00 pm, SECN		Coastal Carolina	W 71–68	7–3	Tad Smith Coliseum (6,490); Oxford, MS
12/22/2014*; 7:00 pm		vs. Southeast Missouri State; Jack Jones Classic	W 82–51	8–3	Southaven Arena (2,222); Southaven, MS
12/30/2014*; 7:00 pm, CBSSN		at Dayton	L 74–78	8–4	UD Arena (12,525); Dayton, OH
01/03/2015*; 1:00 pm		Austin Peay	W 92–63	9–4	Tad Smith Coliseum (6,950); Oxford, MS
Conference games
01/06/2015; 6:00 pm, SECN		at No. 1 Kentucky	L 86–89 ^{OT}	9–5 (0–1)	Rupp Arena (24,275); Lexington, KY
01/10/2015; 4:00 pm, FSN		South Carolina	W 65–49	10–5 (1–1)	Tad Smith Coliseum (6,714); Oxford, MS
01/14/2015; 6:00 pm, SECN		LSU	L 71–75	10–6 (1–2)	Tad Smith Coliseum (7,030); Oxford, MS
01/17/2015; 8:30 pm, ESPNU		at No. 19 Arkansas	W 96–82	11–6 (2–2)	Bud Walton Arena (19,200); Fayetteville, AR
01/20/2015; 6:00 pm, SECN		at Georgia	L 64–69	11–7 (2–3)	Stegeman Coliseum (6,079); Athens, GA
01/24/2015; 5:00 pm, SECN		Florida	W 72–71	12–7 (3–3)	Tad Smith Coliseum (8,812); Oxford, MS
01/28/2015; 8:00 pm, SECN		Mississippi State	W 79–73	13–7 (4–3)	Tad Smith Coliseum (8,959); Oxford, MS
01/31/2015; 3:00 pm, FSN		at Missouri	W 67–47	14–7 (5–3)	Mizzou Arena (9,053); Columbia, MO
02/04/2015; 6:00 pm, SECN		Texas A&M	W 69–59	15–7 (6–3)	Tad Smith Coliseum (7,739); Oxford, MS
02/07/2015; 5:30 pm, SECN		at Auburn	W 86–79	16–7 (7–3)	Auburn Arena (9,121); Auburn, AL
02/12/2015; 6:00 pm, ESPN		at Florida	W 62–61	17–7 (8–3)	O'Connell Center (10,127); Gainesville, FL
02/14/2015; 8:00 pm, SECN		No. 24 Arkansas	L 70–71	17–8 (8–4)	Tad Smith Coliseum (8,719); Oxford, MS
02/19/2015; 8:00 pm, ESPN2		at Mississippi State	W 71–65	18–8 (9–4)	Humphrey Coliseum (7,873); Starkville, MS
02/21/2015; 6:30 pm, ESPNU		Tennessee	W 59–57	19–8 (10–4)	Tad Smith Coliseum (8,630); Oxford, MS
02/25/2015; 8:00 pm, SECN		Georgia	L 72–76	19–9 (10–5)	Tad Smith Coliseum (6,899); Oxford, MS
02/28/2015; 1:00 pm, FSN		at LSU	L 63–73	19–10 (10–6)	Maravich Center (10,683); Baton Rouge, LA
03/03/2015; 6:00 pm, SECN		at Alabama	W 82–74	20–10 (11–6)	Coleman Coliseum (9,184); Tuscaloosa, AL
03/07/2015; 8:00 pm, SECN		Vanderbilt	L 77–86	20–11 (11–7)	Tad Smith Coliseum (8,862); Oxford, MS
SEC tournament
03/12/2015; 8:30 pm, SECN	(6)	vs. (11) South Carolina; Second Round	L 58–60	20–12	Bridgestone Arena (15,032); Nashville, TN
NCAA tournament
03/17/2015*; 8:30 pm, truTV	(11 W)	vs. (11 W) BYU; First Four	W 94–90	21–12	UD Arena (12,124); Dayton, OH
03/19/2015*; 3:10 pm, TBS	(11 W)	vs. (6 W) Xavier; Second round	L 57–76	21–13	Veterans Memorial Arena (N/A); Jacksonville, Florida
*Non-conference game. ^{#}Rankings from AP Poll. (#) Tournament seedings in parentheses. W=West Region. All times are in Central Time.

== See also ==
- 2014–15 Ole Miss Rebels women's basketball team
