= 2014–15 North Carolina Tar Heels men's basketball team =

American college basketball season

2014–15 North Carolina Tar Heels men's basketball

NCAA tournament, Sweet Sixteen
- Conference: Atlantic Coast Conference

Ranking
- Coaches: No. 12
- AP: No. 15
- Record: 26–12 (11–7 ACC)
- Head coach: Roy Williams (12th season)
- Assistant coaches: Steve Robinson (12th season); C. B. McGrath (12th season); Hubert Davis (3rd season)
- Home arena: Dean E. Smith Center

2014–15 ACC men's basketball standings
	Conf.				Overall
Team	W		L	PCT	W		L	PCT
No. 6 Virginia	16	–	2	.889	30	–	4	.882
No. 4 Duke	15	–	3	.833	35	–	4	.897
No. 8 Notre Dame †	14	–	4	.778	32	–	6	.842
No. 15 North Carolina	11	–	7	.611	26	–	12	.684
Miami (FL)	10	–	8	.556	25	–	13	.658
NC State	10	–	8	.556	22	–	14	.611
Syracuse	9	–	9	.500	18	–	13	.581
Clemson	8	–	10	.444	16	–	15	.516
Florida State	8	–	10	.444	17	–	16	.515
Pittsburgh	8	–	10	.444	19	–	15	.559
Wake Forest	5	–	13	.278	13	–	19	.406
Boston College	4	–	14	.222	13	–	19	.406
Georgia Tech	3	–	15	.167	12	–	19	.387
Virginia Tech	2	–	16	.111	11	–	22	.333
No. 17 Louisville*	0	–	6	.000	0	–	8	.000
† ACC tournament winner Rankings from AP poll *Louisville: 24 reg. season games, 4 postseason games vacated due to sanctions against the program; Disputed Record-(27-9)(12-6)

The 2014–15 North Carolina Tar Heels men's basketball team represented the University of North Carolina at Chapel Hill during the 2014–15 NCAA Division I men's basketball season. The team's head coach was Roy Williams, who was in his 12th season. They played their home games at the Dean Smith Center as members of the Atlantic Coast Conference. They finished the season 26–12, 11–7 in ACC play to finish in fifth place. They advanced to the championship game of the ACC tournament, where they lost to Notre Dame. They received an at-large bid to the NCAA tournament, where they defeated Harvard in the second round and Arkansas in the third round before losing in the Sweet Sixteen to eventual runner-up Wisconsin.

== Previous season ==
The Tar Heels finished the season 24–10, 13–5 in ACC play to finish in a tie for third place. They lost in the quarterfinals of the ACC tournament to Pittsburgh. They received an at-large bid to the NCAA tournament, where they defeated Providence in the second round before losing in the third round to Iowa State.

=== Departures ===
Name	Number	Pos.	Height	Weight	Year	Hometown	Reason for departure
P.J. Hairston	15	G	6'6"	220	Junior	Greensboro, NC	Dismissed from the team, declared to NBA draft
James Michael McAdoo	43	F	6'9"	230	Junior	Norfolk, VA	Declared to NBA draft
James Manor	30	F	6'6"	220	Senior	Carrboro, NC	Graduated
Denzel Robinson	34	F	6'4"	220	Senior	Chapel Hill, NC	Graduated
Wade Moody	55	G	6'0"	175	Senior	Mount Airy, NC	Graduated
Leslie McDonald	2	G	6'5"	215	Senior	Memphis, TN	Graduated

== Pre-season ==
The Tar Heels entered the 2014–15 season losing two starters from the previous season, as James Michael McAdoo and P. J. Hairston declared for the 2014 NBA draft. However, rising juniors and potential draft picks Kennedy Meeks and Isaiah Hicks decided to return to Chapel Hill and UNC brought in a strong recruiting class including McDonald's All-Americans Justin Jackson, Theo Pinson, and Joel Berry.

=== Class of 2014 signees ===
North Carolina recruits at the 2014 McDonald's All-American Boys Game

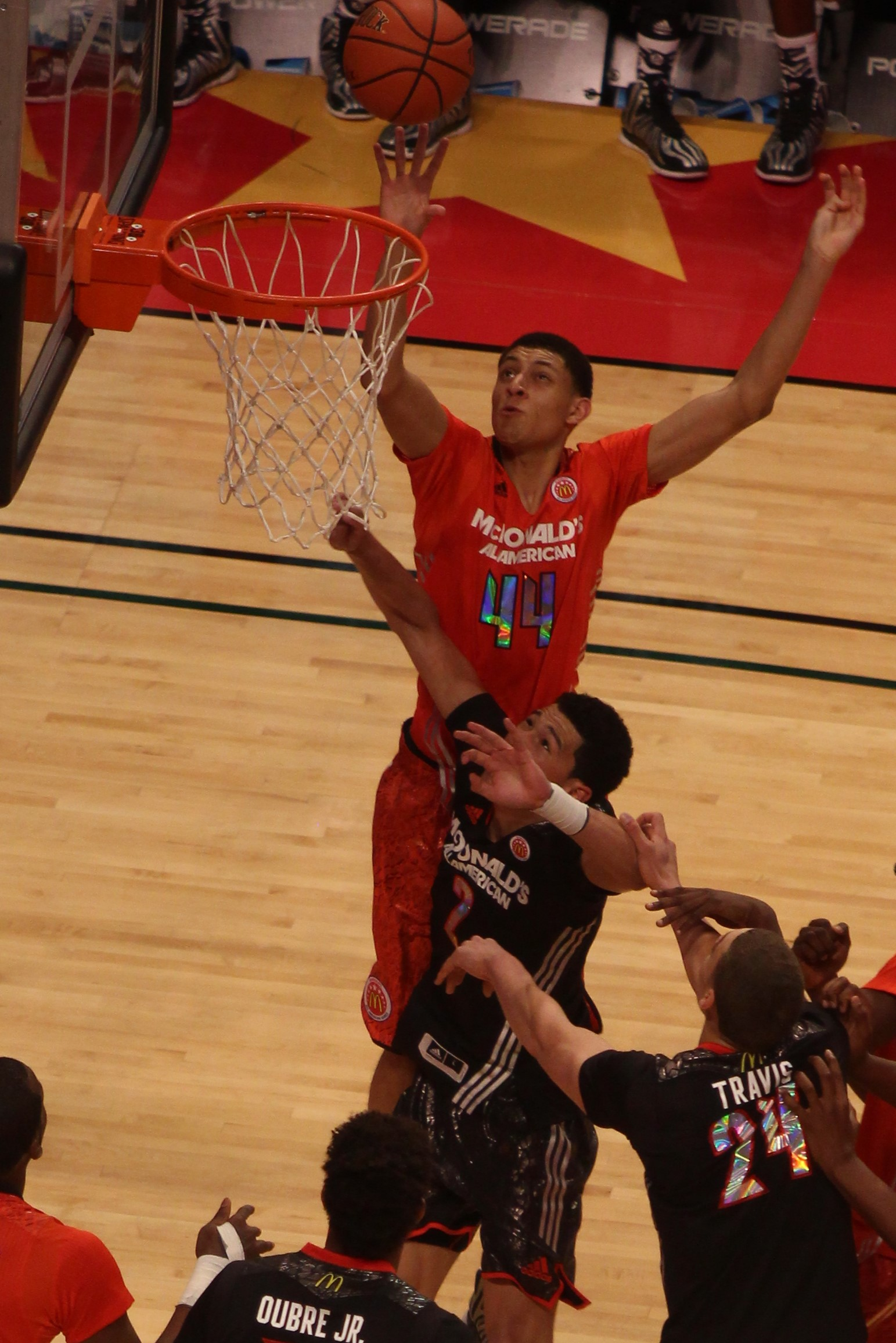
Justin Jackson

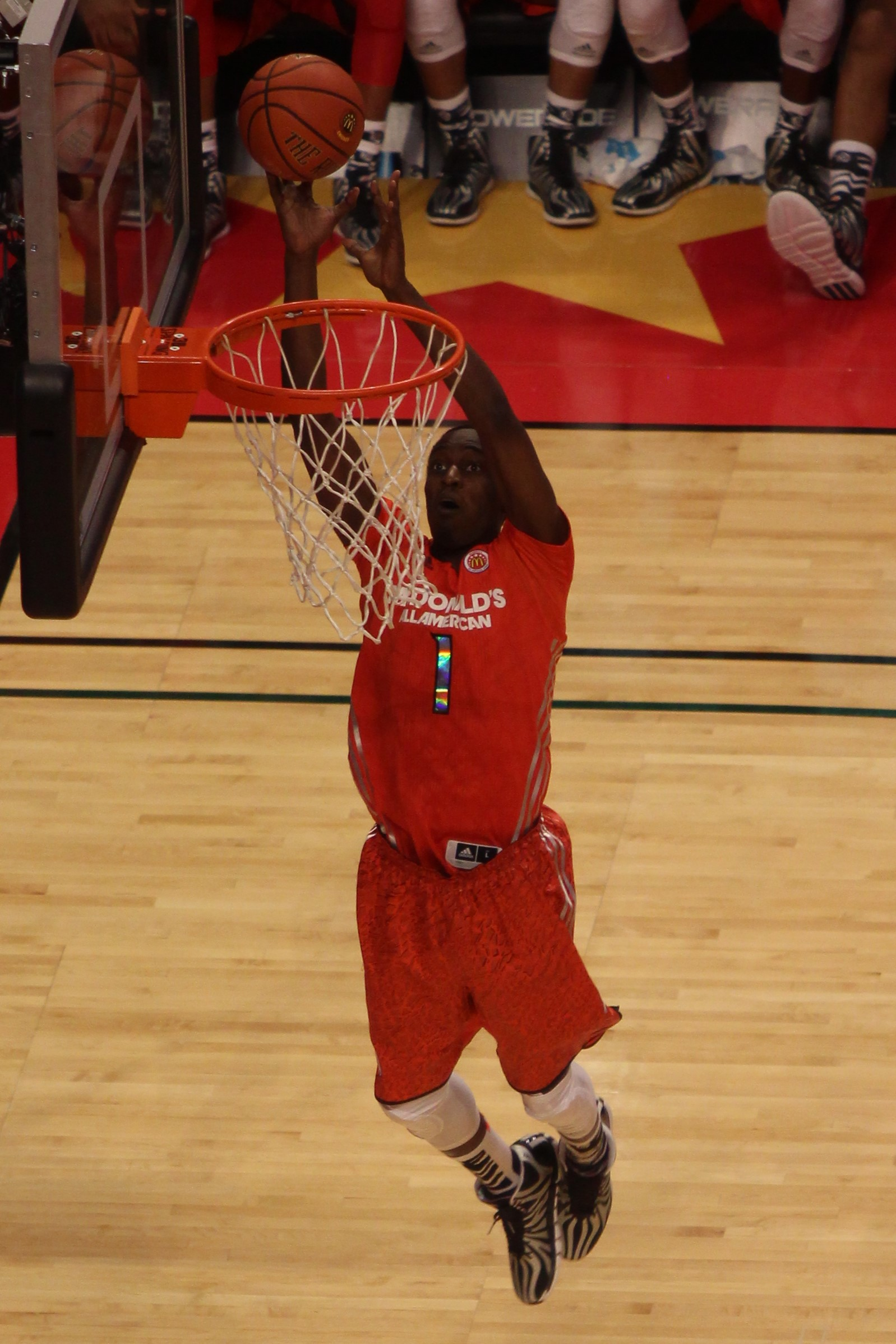
Theo Pinson

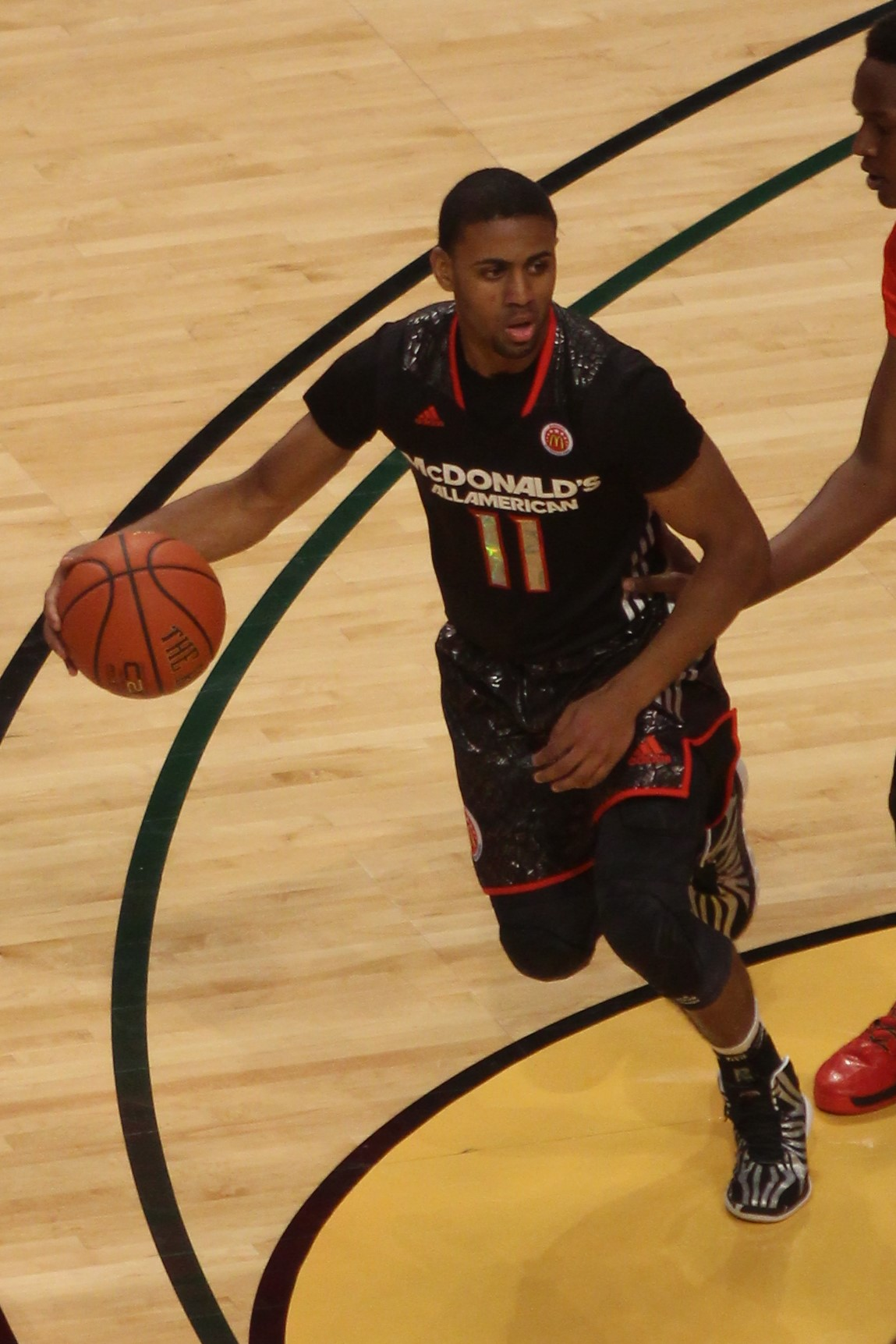
Joel Berry II

College recruiting
Name	Hometown	School	Height	Weight	Commit date
Joel Berry II; PG	Apopka, FL	Lake Highland Prep	6 ft 0 in (1.83 m)	185 lb (84 kg)	Jan 21, 2013
Joel Berry II; PG	Recruit ratings: Scout: Rivals: 247Sports: ESPN:				
Justin Jackson; SF	Tomball, TX	Homeschool Christian Youth	6 ft 8 in (2.03 m)	190 lb (86 kg)	Mar 4, 2013
Justin Jackson; SF	Recruit ratings: Scout: Rivals: 247Sports: ESPN:				
Theo Pinson; SF	Greensboro, NC	Wesleyan Christian Academy	6 ft 6 in (1.98 m)	185 lb (84 kg)	May 22, 2013
Theo Pinson; SF	Recruit ratings: Scout: Rivals: 247Sports: ESPN:				
Overall recruit ranking:
Note: In many cases, Scout, Rivals, 247Sports, On3, and ESPN may conflict in their listings of height and weight.; In these cases, the average was taken. ESPN grades are on a 100-point scale.; Sources: "2014 Team Ranking". Rivals.

== Roster ==
2014–15 North Carolina Tar Heels men's basketball team
Players
Coaches

Pos.	#	Name	Height	Weight	Year	Previous school	Hometown
G	0	Nate Britt	6 ft 1 in (1.85 m)	170 lb (77 kg)	So	Oak Hill Academy	Upper Marlboro, Maryland
G/F	1	Theo Pinson	6 ft 6 in (1.98 m)	195 lb (88 kg)	Fr	Wesleyan Christian Academy	Greensboro, North Carolina
G	2	Joel Berry II	6 ft 0 in (1.83 m)	195 lb (88 kg)	Fr	Lake Highland Prep	Apopka, Florida
F	3	Kennedy Meeks	6 ft 9 in (2.06 m)	270 lb (122 kg)	So	West Charlotte	Charlotte, North Carolina
G	4	Luke Davis	6 ft 0 in (1.83 m)	178 lb (81 kg)	RS Sr	Ravenscroft School	Raleigh, North Carolina
G	5	Marcus Paige	6 ft 1 in (1.85 m)	175 lb (79 kg)	Jr	Linn-Mar	Marion, Iowa
F	11	Brice Johnson	6 ft 9 in (2.06 m)	228 lb (103 kg)	Jr	Edisto	Orangeburg, South Carolina
F	13	J. P. Tokoto	6 ft 6 in (1.98 m)	200 lb (91 kg)	Jr	Menomonee Falls	Menomonee Falls, Wisconsin
F	14	Desmond Hubert	6 ft 10 in (2.08 m)	225 lb (102 kg)	Sr	New Egypt	Cream Ridge, New Jersey
F	21	Jackson Simmons	6 ft 7 in (2.01 m)	225 lb (102 kg)	Sr	Smoky Mountain	Webster, North Carolina
F	22	Isaiah Hicks	6 ft 8 in (2.03 m)	230 lb (104 kg)	So	J.F. Webb	Oxford, North Carolina
F	24	Sasha Seymore (W)	6 ft 6 in (1.98 m)	220 lb (100 kg)	Sr	New Bern	New Bern, North Carolina
G	25	Justin Coleman (W)	6 ft 2 in (1.88 m)	180 lb (82 kg)	Jr	Broughton	Raleigh, North Carolina
F	42	Joel James	6 ft 10 in (2.08 m)	280 lb (127 kg)	Jr	Dwyer	West Palm Beach, Florida
G	43	Spenser Dalton (W)	6 ft 3 in (1.91 m)	205 lb (93 kg)	Jr	Christ School	Asheville, North Carolina
G/F	44	Justin Jackson	6 ft 8 in (2.03 m)	193 lb (88 kg)	Fr	Homeschool Christian Youth Association	Tomball, Texas
G	45	Stilman White	6 ft 0 in (1.83 m)	170 lb (77 kg)	RS So	Hoggard	Wilmington, North Carolina

Head coach

- Roy Williams (North Carolina)

Assistant coach(es)

- Steve Robinson (Radford)
- C. B. McGrath (Kansas)
- Hubert Davis (North Carolina)

Legend

- (C) Team captain
- (S) Suspended
- (I) Ineligible
- (W) Walk-on
- Injured
- Current redshirt

Roster

== Schedule and results ==
Date time, TV	Rank^{#}	Opponent^{#}	Result	Record	High points	High rebounds	High assists	Site (attendance) city, state
Exhibition
Oct 24*; 7:30 pm	No. 6	Fayetteville State	W 101–58		18 – Jackson	13 – Johnson	8 – Tokoto	Dean Smith Center (9,171); Chapel Hill, NC
Nov 7*; 7:30 pm	No. 6	Belmont Abbey	W 112–34		16 – Jackson	5 – Tied	6 – Tokoto	Dean Smith Center (11,441); Chapel Hill, NC
Non-conference regular season
Nov 14*; 8:00 pm, ESPNU	No. 6	North Carolina Central	W 76–60	1–0	12 – Johnson	9 – Meeks	4 – Tied	Dean Smith Center (17,338); Chapel Hill, NC
Nov 16*; 6:00 pm, ESPNU	No. 6	Robert Morris; Battle 4 Atlantis Opening Round	W 103–59	2–0	23 – Johnson	12 – Meeks	10 – Tokoto	Dean Smith Center (13,579); Chapel Hill, NC
Nov 22*; 2:00 pm	No. 6	vs. Davidson	W 90–72	3–0	19 – Meeks	12 – Meeks	4 – Tokoto	Time Warner Cable Arena (11,113); Charlotte, NC
Nov 26*; 12:00 pm, ESPN2	No. 5	vs. Butler; Battle 4 Atlantis Quarterfinals	L 66–74	3–1	18 – Paige	9 – Meeks	4 – Tokoto	Imperial Arena (3,136); Nassau, BAH
Nov 27*; 7:00 pm, AXS TV	No. 5	vs. No. 22 UCLA; Battle 4 Atlantis consolation 2nd round	W 78–56	4–1	21 – Paige	7 – Pinson	5 – Paige	Imperial Arena (2,940); Nassau, BAH
Nov 28*; 8:00 pm, AXS TV	No. 5	vs. No. 18 Florida; Battle 4 Atlantis 5th place game	W 75–64	5–1	18 – Meeks	13 – Meeks	4 – Tied	Imperial Arena (3,298); Nassau, BAH
Dec 3*; 7:30 pm, ESPN	No. 12	Iowa; ACC–Big Ten Challenge	L 55–60	5–2	15 – Meeks	12 – Meeks	3 – Tokoto	Dean Smith Center (18,040); Chapel Hill, NC
Dec 7*; 2:00 pm, ESPNU	No. 12	East Carolina	W 108–64	6–2	19 – Tied	17 – Johnson	8 – Tokoto	Dean Smith Center (18,741); Chapel Hill, NC
Dec 13*; 12:00 pm, CBS	No. 21	at No. 1 Kentucky; Rivalry	L 70–84	6–3	15 – Johnson	6 – Tokoto	6 – Paige	Rupp Arena (24,406); Lexington, KY
Dec 16*; 7:00 pm, ESPN2	No. 24	at UNC Greensboro	W 79–56	7–3	18 – Meeks	7 – Paige	4 – Pinson	Greensboro Coliseum (11,108); Greensboro, NC
Dec 20*; 1:00 pm, CBS	No. 24	vs. No. 12 Ohio State; CBS Sports Classic	W 82–74	8–3	18 – Johnson	13 – Meeks	5 – Tied	United Center (19,726); Chicago, IL
Dec 27*; 7:30 pm, ESPN2	No. 20	UAB	W 89–58	9–3	16 – Paige	19 – Meeks	4 – Tied	Dean Smith Center (19,124); Chapel Hill, NC
Dec 30*; 7:00 pm, RSN	No. 19	William & Mary	W 86–64	10–3	19 – Tokoto	10 – Tokoto	6 – Paige	Dean Smith Center (20,053); Chapel Hill, NC
ACC regular season
Jan 3; 8:15 pm, ESPN	No. 19	at Clemson	W 74–50	11–3 (1–0)	13 – Jackson	12 – Meeks	7 – Tokoto	Littlejohn Coliseum (8,404); Clemson, SC
Jan 5; 7:00 pm, ESPN	No. 18	No. 13 Notre Dame	L 70–71	11–4 (1–1)	15 – Paige	8 – Pinson	2 – Tied	Dean Smith Center (20,604); Chapel Hill, NC
Jan 10; 2:00 pm, ESPN	No. 18	No. 5 Louisville	W 72–71	12–4 (2–1)	13 – Meeks	11 – Johnson	5 – Tokoto	Dean Smith Center (21,750); Chapel Hill, NC
Jan 14; 7:00 pm, ESPN2	No. 15	at NC State; Carolina–State Game	W 81–79	13–4 (3–1)	23 – Paige	10 – Meeks	9 – Paige	PNC Arena (19,500); Raleigh, NC
Jan 18; 6:30 pm, ESPNU	No. 15	Virginia Tech	W 68–53	14–4 (4–1)	16 – Jackson	11 – Johnson	4 – Tied	Dean Smith Center (19,745); Chapel Hill, NC
Jan 21; 7:00 pm, ESPN2	No. 15	at Wake Forest	W 87–71	15–4 (5–1)	19 – Johnson	8 – Meeks	8 – Paige	LJVM Coliseum (13,877); Winston-Salem, NC
Jan 24; 2:00 pm, ESPN	No. 15	Florida State	W 78–74	16–4 (6–1)	19 – Paige	14 – Johnson	3 – Tied	Dean Smith Center (20,512); Chapel Hill, NC
Jan 26; 7:00 pm, ESPN	No. 13	Syracuse	W 93–83	17–4 (7–1)	22 – Paige	11 – Johnson	8 – Paige	Dean Smith Center (19,856); Chapel Hill, NC
Jan 31; 4:00 pm, ESPN	No. 13	at No. 10 Louisville	L 68–78 ^{OT}	17–5 (7–2)	15 – Paige	11 – Tokoto	4 – Paige	KFC Yum! Center (22,418); Louisville, KY
Feb 2; 7:00 pm, ESPN	No. 12	No. 3 Virginia	L 64–75	17–6 (7–3)	15 – Paige	8 – Johnson	4 – Paige	Dean Smith Center (20,102); Chapel Hill, NC
Feb 7; 3:00 pm, ACCN/ESPN3	No. 12	at Boston College	W 79–68	18–6 (8–3)	21 – Hicks	10 – Johnson	5 – Tokoto	Conte Forum (8,263); Chestnut Hill, MA
Feb 14; 12:00 pm, ACCN/ESPN3	No. 12	at Pittsburgh	L 76–89	18–7 (8–4)	19 – Johnson	7 – Tokoto	6 – Tied	Peterson Events Center (12,508); Pittsburgh, PA
Feb 18; 9:00 pm, ESPN/ACCN	No. 15	at No. 4 Duke; Rivalry	L 90–92 ^{OT}	18–8 (8–5)	18 – Tied	12 – Johnson	7 – Tokoto	Cameron Indoor Stadium (9,314); Durham, NC
Feb 21; 12:00 pm, ACCN	No. 15	Georgia Tech	W 89–60	19–8 (9–5)	18 – Meeks	6 – Tied	10 – Paige	Dean Smith Center (20,779); Chapel Hill, NC
Feb 24; 8:00 pm, ACCN	No. 15	NC State; Carolina–State Game	L 46–58	19–9 (9–6)	16 – Jackson	14 – Meeks	2 – Tokoto	Dean Smith Center (21,750); Chapel Hill, NC
Feb 28; 2:00 pm, CBS	No. 15	at Miami (FL)	W 73–64	20–9 (10–6)	22 – Johnson	11 – Johnson	6 – Tokoto	BankUnited Center (7,972); Coral Gables, FL
Mar 3; 7:00 pm, ESPNU	No. 19	at Georgia Tech	W 81–49	21–9 (11–6)	15 – Berry II	9 – Johnson	4 – Paige	Hank McCamish Pavilion (6,913); Atlanta, GA
Mar 7; 9:00 pm, ESPN	No. 19	No. 3 Duke; Rivalry/ESPN College GameDay	L 77–84	21–10 (11–7)	23 – Paige	9 – Meeks	5 – Tied	Dean Smith Center (21,750); Chapel Hill, NC
ACC Tournament
Mar 11; 2:00 pm, ESPN/ACCN	No. 19	vs. Boston College; Second Round	W 81–63	22–10	21 – Hicks	10 – Johnson	5 – Tokoto	Greensboro Coliseum (22,026); Greensboro, NC
Mar 12; 2:00 pm, ESPN/ACCN	No. 19	vs. No. 16 Louisville; Quarterfinals	W 70–60	23–10	22 – Johnson	7 – Johnson	5 – Paige	Greensboro Coliseum (22,026); Greensboro, NC
Mar 13; 7:00 pm, ESPN/ACCN	No. 19	vs. No. 3 Virginia; Semifinals	W 71–67	24–10	22 – Jackson	9 – Meeks	5 – Tied	Greensboro Coliseum (22,026); Greensboro, NC
Mar 14; 8:30 pm, ESPN/ACCN	No. 19	vs. No. 11 Notre Dame; Championship game	L 82–90	24–11	24 – Paige	6 – Tokoto	7 – Tokoto	Greensboro Coliseum (22,026); Greensboro, NC
NCAA tournament
Mar 19*; 7:20 pm, TNT	(4 W) No. 15	vs. (13 W) Harvard; Second round	W 67–65	25–11	14 – Jackson	8 – Meeks	6 – Paige	Veterans Memorial Arena (12,761); Jacksonville, FL
Mar 21*; 8:40 pm, TNT	(4 W) No. 15	vs. (5 W) No. 21 Arkansas; Third round	W 87–78	26–11	22 – Paige	13 – Johnson	8 – Tokoto	Veterans Memorial Arena (13,687); Jacksonville, FL
Mar 26*; 7:47 pm, TBS	(4 W) No. 15	vs. (1 W) No. 3 Wisconsin; Sweet Sixteen	L 72–79	26–12	15 – Tied	6 – Hicks	3 – Tied	Staples Center (18,809); Los Angeles, CA
*Non-conference game. ^{#}Rankings from AP poll. (#) Tournament seedings in parentheses. W=West region. All times are in Eastern Time.

== Rankings ==
Ranking movements Legend: ██ Increase in ranking ██ Decrease in ranking
	Week																			
Poll	Pre	2	3	4	5	6	7	8	9	10	11	12	13	14	15	16	17	18	19	Final
AP	6	6	5	12	21	24	21	19	18	15	15	13	12	12	15	15	19	19	15	N/A
Coaches	6	6	6	12	18	24	21	20	17	16	15	14	13	15	16	18	19	19	14	12

== Players drafted into the NBA ==
Year	Round	Pick	Player	NBA club
2015	2	58	J. P. Tokoto	Philadelphia 76ers
2016	1	25	Brice Johnson	Los Angeles Clippers
2016	2	55	Marcus Paige	Brooklyn Nets
2017	1	15	Justin Jackson	Portland Trail Blazers
