= 2015–16 Kentucky Wildcats men's basketball team =

2015–16 season of University of Kentucky men's basketball team

2015–16 Kentucky Wildcats men's basketball

SEC tournament champions SEC regular season co-champions

NCAA tournament, Second Round
- Conference: Southeastern Conference

Ranking
- Coaches: No. 16
- AP: No. 10
- Record: 27–9 (13–5 SEC)
- Head coach: John Calipari (7th season)
- Assistant coaches: John Robic (7th season); Kenny Payne (6th season); Tony Barbee (2nd season)
- Home arena: Rupp Arena

2015–16 Southeastern Conference men's basketball standings
	Conf.				Overall
Team	W		L	PCT	W		L	PCT
No. 15 Texas A&M	13	–	5	.722	28	–	9	.757
No. 10 Kentucky †	13	–	5	.722	27	–	9	.750
South Carolina	11	–	7	.611	25	–	9	.735
Vanderbilt	11	–	7	.611	19	–	14	.576
LSU	11	–	7	.611	19	–	14	.576
Ole Miss	10	–	8	.556	20	–	12	.625
Georgia	10	–	8	.556	20	–	14	.588
Florida	9	–	9	.500	21	–	15	.583
Arkansas	9	–	9	.500	16	–	16	.500
Alabama	8	–	10	.444	18	–	15	.545
Mississippi State	7	–	11	.389	14	–	17	.452
Tennessee	6	–	12	.333	15	–	19	.441
Auburn	5	–	13	.278	11	–	20	.355
Missouri^{*}	3	–	15	.167	10	–	21	.323
† 2016 SEC tournament winner^{*}Ineligible for postseason play due to self-imposed postseason ban. Rankings from AP poll

The 2015–16 Kentucky Wildcats men's basketball team represented the University of Kentucky in the 2015–16 NCAA Division I men's basketball season. The team played its home games in Lexington, Kentucky for the 40th consecutive season at Rupp Arena, with a capacity of 23,500. The team was led by John Calipari, in his seventh season. They were a member of the Southeastern Conference. They finished the season 27–9, 13–5 in SEC play to win a share of the SEC regular season championship. They defeated Alabama, Georgia, and Texas A&M to be champions of the SEC tournament. They received the conference's automatic bid to the NCAA tournament, where they defeated Stony Brook in the first round to advance to the second round where they lost to Indiana.

== Departures ==
Name	Number	Pos.	Height	Weight	Year	Hometown	Notes
Devin Booker	1	Guard	6'6"	206	Freshman	Grand Rapids, Michigan	Entered 2015 NBA draft
Aaron Harrison	2	Guard	6'6"	212	Sophomore	Fort Bend, Texas	Entered 2015 NBA draft
Andrew Harrison	5	Guard	6'6"	212	Sophomore	Fort Bend, Texas	Entered 2015 NBA draft
Karl-Anthony Towns	12	Forward	6'11"	250	Freshman	Piscataway, New Jersey	Entered 2015 NBA draft
Sam Malone	13	Guard	5'11"	185	Senior	Scituate, Massachusetts	Graduated
Willie Cauley-Stein	15	Center	7'0"	240	Junior	Olathe, Kansas	Entered 2015 NBA draft
Tod Lanter	21	Guard	6'2"	190	Senior	Lexington, Kentucky	Graduated
Brian Long	32	Guard	5'9"	155	Senior	Dumont, New Jersey	Graduated
Trey Lyles	41	Forward	6'10"	235	Freshman	Indianapolis, Indiana	Entered 2015 NBA draft
Dakari Johnson	44	Center	7'0"	255	Sophomore	Brooklyn, New York	Entered 2015 NBA draft

== 2015–16 newcomers ==
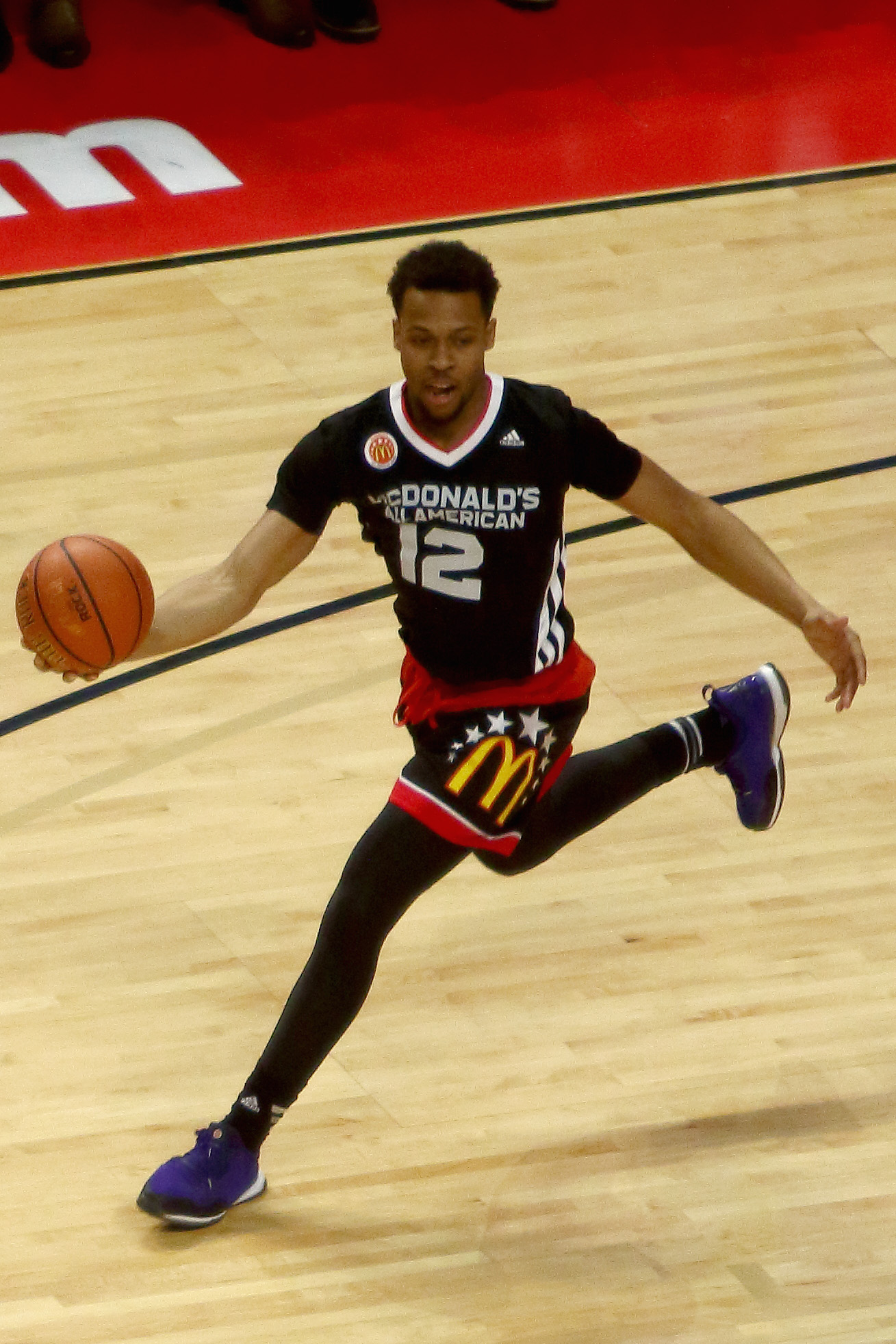
Recruit Isaiah Briscoe at the 2015 McDonald's All-American Boys Game

Isaiah Briscoe, originally from Newark, New Jersey, was the third highest rated point guard that Calipari had signed at Kentucky. He committed to Kentucky on November 13, live on ESPNU. He chose Kentucky over St. John's. He was the nation's consensus top point guard, was ranked the consensus No. 13 overall player by the four main recruiting services Rivals, ESPN, Scout, and 24/7 Sports. He helped lead Team USA at the 2014 FIBA Americans U18 Championships to a gold medal. He was a McDonald's All-America and Jordan Brand Classic game selection.

Skal Labissière, originally from Haiti, was a consensus top five player in the 2015 class. He moved to Memphis, Tennessee from his home country after an earthquake disaster in January 2010. Labissière and Briscoe committed on the same night, minutes apart, on ESPNU. Labissière chose Kentucky over Memphis. Calipari has likened Labissière to former Wildcats Anthony Davis and Nerlens Noel.

Charles Matthews, originally from Chicago, Illinois, was the first commitment in the 2015 signing class on February 26, 2014. Once considered a top-15 player in class, Matthews finished in the top-60 recruits on the four recruiting services.

Mychal Mulder, originally from Windsor, Ontario, was the first signee after the conclusion of the 2015 season. Mulder helped lead Vincennes University to a 33–2 record, earned JUCO All-America honors and was rated the 13th-best junior-college prospect in the country by 247Sports.com's composite ranking. He chose Kentucky over Creighton, Indiana, and Wichita State at a press conference on April 28.

Jamal Murray, originally from Kitchener, Ontario, was the last signee for the 2016 season. Murray was originally a member of the 2016 recruiting class but reclassified to the 2015 class. Murray was rated a top-15 prospect by nearly every recruiting service and tabbed a consensus five-star recruit. Murray's stock began to soar following a breakout performance at the Nike Hoop Summit against the USA Basketball Team. He scored 30 points against the United States prior to a 29-point, 10-assist, eight-rebound effort in the BioSteel All-Canadian Basketball Game.

College recruiting
Name	Hometown	School	Height	Weight	Commit date
Isaiah Briscoe; PG	Newark, New Jersey	Roselle Catholic	6 ft 3 in (1.91 m)	200 lb (91 kg)	Nov 13, 2014
Isaiah Briscoe; PG	Recruit ratings: Scout: Rivals: 247Sports: ESPN:				
Isaac Humphries; C	Sydney, Australia	La Lumiere School	7 ft 0 in (2.13 m)	260 lb (120 kg)	Aug 20, 2015
Isaac Humphries; C	Recruit ratings: Scout: Rivals: 247Sports: ESPN:				
Skal Labissière; C	Port-au-Prince, Haiti	Lausanne Collegiate School	6 ft 11 in (2.11 m)	210 lb (95 kg)	Nov 13, 2014
Skal Labissière; C	Recruit ratings: Scout: Rivals: 247Sports: ESPN:				
Charles Matthews; SG	Chicago, Illinois	St. Rita	6 ft 5 in (1.96 m)	175 lb (79 kg)	Feb 26, 2014
Charles Matthews; SG	Recruit ratings: Scout: Rivals: 247Sports: ESPN:				
Mychal Mulder; SG	Windsor, Ontario	Vincennes University (IN)	6 ft 4 in (1.93 m)	185 lb (84 kg)	Apr 28, 2015
Mychal Mulder; SG	Recruit ratings: Scout: Rivals: 247Sports: ESPN:				
Jamal Murray; SG	Kitchener, Ontario	Athlete Institute	6 ft 5 in (1.96 m)	195 lb (88 kg)	Jun 24, 2015
Jamal Murray; SG	Recruit ratings: Scout: Rivals: 247Sports: ESPN:				
Overall recruit ranking: Scout: 2 Rivals: 2 ESPN: 1
Note: In many cases, Scout, Rivals, 247Sports, On3, and ESPN may conflict in their listings of height and weight.; In these cases, the average was taken. ESPN grades are on a 100-point scale.; Sources: "Kentucky 2015 Basketball Commitments". Rivals.; "2015 Kentucky Basketball Commits". Scout.; "ESPN". ESPN.; "Scout.com Team Recruiting Rankings". Scout.; "2015 Team Ranking". Rivals.

== Pre-season ==
=== Roster ===
On April 9 the University of Kentucky held a press conference for all players that intended to declare for the 2015 NBA draft. Seven players declared themselves eligible for the draft: Booker, Cauley-Stein, the Harrison twins (Aaron and Andrew), Johnson, Lyles, and Towns. On April 13, assistant coach Barry Rohrssen left the team to join the St. John's staff under new head coach Chris Mullin. On April 23 Poythress announced that he would return to Kentucky for his senior season. On April 28 Mulder announced his decision to attend Kentucky at press conference. On May 22 Tony Barbee, who served as special assistant to Calipari in 2015, was officially announced as Rohrssen's replacement on Calipari's staff. On June 24 Murray announced his decision to Kentucky televised on Canada's TSN, donning a Canadian flag. He chose Kentucky over Oregon. On August 20 it was announced that Humphries would reclassify from the 2016 class to the 2015 class to join the team for the season.

=== Off-season rankings ===
The earliest preseason predictions were made the day after the 2015 NCAA tournament on April 7, before final decisions by college players about declaring for the 2015 NBA draft and before many high-school players signed a National Letter of Intent about their 2015 seasons. Despite the speculation that most of the 2015 roster would declare for the NBA draft, ESPN ranked Kentucky as its top ranked team for the 2015–16 season. Sporting News projected that Kentucky would be one of the top five teams. CBSSports.com ranked Kentucky as their number three team in their initial rankings.

=== Accolades and rankings ===
The Southeastern Conference preseason media poll was released at the SEC Media Days in October, it predicted that Kentucky would win the championship. Skal Labissière and Tyler Ulis were named to the All-SEC First Team.

USA Today announced its initial coaches poll on October 15 with Kentucky ranked as No. 1 in the country, which was also shared with North Carolina. The Associated Press announced on October 31 that Kentucky was ranked No. 2 to start the season in its initial poll of the season.

=== Events ===
On May 21 Kentucky released the non-conference portion of its schedule. The schedule is highlighted by marquee match-ups at Rupp Arena and across the country. Kentucky will travel to Chicago to play defending National Champion Duke in the annual Champions Classic, to Los Angeles to play UCLA for its first ever game at Pauley Pavilion, to Miami to play South Florida and former assistant Orlando Antigua, and to Brooklyn to play against Ohio State in the annual CBS Sports Classic. Kentucky will also host Arizona State and in-state rival Louisville. On August 19 the SEC released its schedule for the upcoming season.

Tickets for Big Blue Madness, Kentucky's version of Midnight Madness went on sale and sold out on October 2.

Big Blue Madness took place on October 16. The event debuted the team for the 2015–16 season. It included player introductions, a speech by Calipari, and a scrimmage.

The Blue-White scrimmage was the first live game for the team. It occurred at Rupp Arena on October 27. Tyler Ulis scored 10 points and added 15 assists as the White squad defeated the Blue squad 74 to 66.

== 2016–17 commitments and signees ==
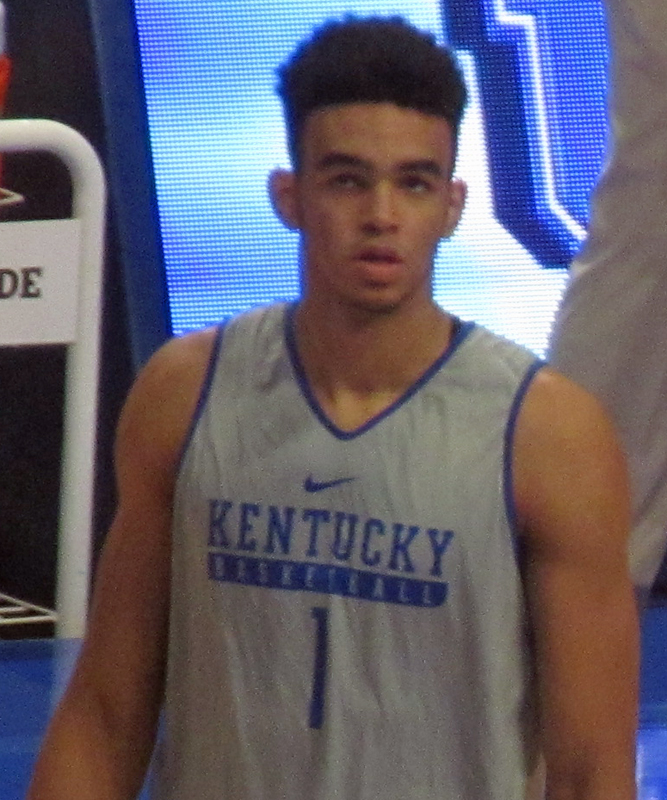
Sacha Killeya-Jones

Bam Adebayo, originally from Pinetown, North Carolina, was a consensus top 15 player in his class. He committed to Kentucky on November 17, live on ESPN's Mike & Mike simulcast radio show. He chose Kentucky over NC State and Auburn. He is ranked in the top 10 by Rivals (No. 6) and ESPN (No. 6). 247Sports (No. 14) and Scout (No. 15) tab him as a top-15 prospect in the 2016 class. He has prior USA Basketball experience and was named a MaxPreps All-American in 2013.

De'Aaron Fox, originally from Katy, Texas, was the second highest rated point guard that Calipari had signed at Kentucky. He committed to Kentucky on November 12, live on ESPNU. He chose Kentucky over Kansas, Louisville, and LSU. He was the nation's consensus top point guard, was ranked the consensus No. 3 overall player by the four main recruiting services Rivals, ESPN, Scout, and 24/7 Sports.

Wenyen Gabriel, originally from Manchester, New Hampshire, was the third commitment in the Kentucky class. He committed to Kentucky on October 1, live on the radio. He chose Kentucky over Connecticut, Duke, and Maryland. He was a consensus five star prospect, and was ranked the consensus No. 17 overall player by the four main recruiting services Rivals, ESPN, Scout, and 24/7 Sports.

Sacha Killeya-Jones, originally from Chapel Hill, North Carolina, was the second commitment in the Kentucky class. He committed to Kentucky on October 1, live on the radio. He chose Kentucky over Connecticut, North Carolina, and Virginia. He was a consensus four star prospect, and was ranked the consensus No. 36 overall player by the four main recruiting services Rivals, ESPN, Scout, and 24/7 Sports.

Malik Monk, originally from Bentonville, Arkansas, was the second highest rated shooting guard that Calipari signed at Kentucky. He committed to Kentucky on November 18. He chose Kentucky over Arkansas where his brother, Marcus Monk, played college basketball and football. He was a consensus five star prospect, and was ranked the consensus No. 5 overall player by the four main recruiting services Rivals, ESPN, Scout, and 24/7 Sports.

Tai Wynyard, originally from Auckland, New Zealand, was the first commitment in the 2016 class. Wynyard committed to Kentucky on January 25. He was a consensus four star prospect, and enrolled in December 2015 to join the team in the spring.

College recruiting
Name	Hometown	School	Height	Weight	Commit date
Bam Adebayo; PF	Pinetown, NC	High Point Christian Academy	6 ft 9 in (2.06 m)	230 lb (100 kg)	Nov 17, 2015
Bam Adebayo; PF	Recruit ratings: Scout: Rivals: 247Sports: ESPN:				
De'Aaron Fox; PG	Katy, TX	Cypress Lakes HS	6 ft 4 in (1.93 m)	170 lb (77 kg)	Nov 12, 2015
De'Aaron Fox; PG	Recruit ratings: Scout: Rivals: 247Sports: ESPN:				
Wenyen Gabriel; PF	Manchester, NH	Wilbraham & Monson Academy	6 ft 9 in (2.06 m)	203 lb (92 kg)	Oct 1, 2015
Wenyen Gabriel; PF	Recruit ratings: Scout: Rivals: 247Sports: ESPN:				
Sacha Killeya-Jones; PF	Chapel Hill, NC	Virginia Episcopal School	6 ft 10 in (2.08 m)	200 lb (91 kg)	Aug 19, 2015
Sacha Killeya-Jones; PF	Recruit ratings: Scout: Rivals: 247Sports: ESPN:				
Malik Monk; SG	Bentonville, AR	Bentonville HS	6 ft 2 in (1.88 m)	185 lb (84 kg)	Nov 18, 2015
Malik Monk; SG	Recruit ratings: Scout: Rivals: 247Sports: ESPN:				
Tai Wynyard; PF	Auckland, New Zealand	Rangitoto College	6 ft 9 in (2.06 m)	230 lb (100 kg)	Jan 25, 2015
Tai Wynyard; PF	Recruit ratings: Scout: Rivals: 247Sports: ESPN:				
Overall recruit ranking:
Note: In many cases, Scout, Rivals, 247Sports, On3, and ESPN may conflict in their listings of height and weight.; In these cases, the average was taken. ESPN grades are on a 100-point scale.; Sources: "Kentucky 2016 Basketball Commitments". Rivals.; "2016 Kentucky Basketball Commits". Scout.; "ESPN". ESPN.; "Scout.com Team Recruiting Rankings". Scout.; "2016 Team Ranking". Rivals.

== Roster ==
2015–16 Kentucky Wildcats men's basketball team
Players
Coaches

Pos.	#	Name	Height	Weight	Year	Previous school	Hometown
F	00	Marcus Lee	6 ft 9 in (2.06 m)	224 lb (102 kg)	Jr	Deer Valley	Antioch, California
C	1	Skal Labissière	6 ft 11 in (2.11 m)	225 lb (102 kg)	Fr	Lausanne (TN)	Port-au-Prince, Haiti
G	3	Tyler Ulis	5 ft 9 in (1.75 m)	160 lb (73 kg)	So	Marian Catholic	Lima, Ohio
G	4	Charles Matthews	6 ft 6 in (1.98 m)	189 lb (86 kg)	Fr	St. Rita	Chicago, Illinois
G	10	Jonny David (W)	6 ft 2 in (1.88 m)	175 lb (79 kg)	Fr	Mt. Lebanon	Pittsburgh, Pennsylvania
G	11	Mychal Mulder	6 ft 4 in (1.93 m)	185 lb (84 kg)	Jr	Vincennes	Windsor, Ontario
G	13	Isaiah Briscoe	6 ft 3 in (1.91 m)	202 lb (92 kg)	Fr	Roselle Catholic	Newark, New Jersey
F	14	Tai Wynyard (redshirt)	6 ft 10 in (2.08 m)	255 lb (116 kg)	Fr	Rangitoto College	Auckland, New Zealand
F	15	Isaac Humphries	7 ft 0 in (2.13 m)	260 lb (118 kg)	Fr	La Lumiere School	Sydney, Australia
F	22	Alex Poythress	6 ft 8 in (2.03 m)	230 lb (104 kg)	Sr	Northeast	Clarksville, Tennessee
G	23	Jamal Murray	6 ft 4 in (1.93 m)	207 lb (94 kg)	Fr	Athlete Institute	Kitchener, Ontario
G	24	E. J. Floréal	6 ft 4 in (1.93 m)	203 lb (92 kg)	Jr	Dunbar	Palo Alto, California
G	25	Dominique Hawkins	6 ft 0 in (1.83 m)	190 lb (86 kg)	Jr	Madison Central	Richmond, Kentucky
G	32	Dillon Pulliam (W)	6 ft 3 in (1.91 m)	180 lb (82 kg)	So	Transylvania	Cynthiana, Kentucky
F	35	Derek Willis	6 ft 9 in (2.06 m)	220 lb (100 kg)	Jr	Bullitt East	Mount Washington, Kentucky

Head coach

- John Calipari (Clarion)

Assistant coach(es)

- John Robic (Denison)
- Kenny Payne (Louisville)
- Tony Barbee (UMass)

Legend

- (C) Team captain
- (S) Suspended
- (I) Ineligible
- (W) Walk-on
- Injured
- Current redshirt

Roster
Last update: December 18, 2015

- Roster is subject to change as/if players transfer or leave the program for other reasons.

=== Depth chart ===
Pos.	Starting 5	Bench 1	Bench 2
C	Marcus Lee	Isaac Humphries
PF	Alex Poythress	Skal Labissière
SF	Jamal Murray	Derek Willis	E. J. Floreal
SG	Isaiah Briscoe	Charles Matthews	Mychal Mulder
PG	Tyler Ulis	Dominique Hawkins	Johnny David

== Schedule ==
=== November ===
The season officially began on November 13 with a 78–65 victory over Albany in the first game of the HoopHall Invitational at Rupp Arena. The following night Kentucky defeated NJIT 87–57 behind 26 points from Labissiere. Three nights later the team traveled to Chicago for the Champions Classic to play No. 5 Duke. The Cats defeated the Blue Devils 74–63 which was Kentucky's first victory over Duke since the 1998 NCAA tournament Kentucky returned home on November 20 to defeat Wright State 78–63. Ulis led the team with 21 points and 5 assists. Kentucky entered its game against Boston U. on November 24 ranked number one in the country for the first time this season. The Cats defeated the Terriers 82–62. The night after Thanksgiving, on November 27, Kentucky traveled to Miami to play South Florida in the Hoops Hall Invitational. Kentucky defeated the Bulls 84–63 despite losing Ulis in the first half to a hyper-extended elbow. On November 30 Kentucky returned home to defeat Illinois State 75–63 behind 16 points from Murray.

=== December ===
On December 3 Kentucky traveled to Los Angeles to play UCLA for their first meeting ever in Pauley Pavilion. UCLA defeated Kentucky 87–77 which was Kentucky's first regular season loss since March 8, 2014 at Florida. Kentucky returned home on December 9 to defeat Eastern Kentucky 88–67 behind 22 points and 13 rebounds from Poythress. On December 12 Kentucky hosted Arizona State and defeated the Sun Devils 72–58 behind 14 points and 7 rebounds from Lee. On December 19 Kentucky traveled to Brooklyn to play in the annual CBS Sports Classic against Ohio State. Despite 33 points from Murray, the Buckeyes defeated UK 67–74. On December 26 Kentucky returned home to play in the annual Battle for the Bluegrass against Louisville. For the second consecutive year Ulis was named MVP of the game after a 21 points, 8 assist performance to lead Kentucky to a 75–73 victory. The win marked the seventh victory out of the last eight.

=== January ===
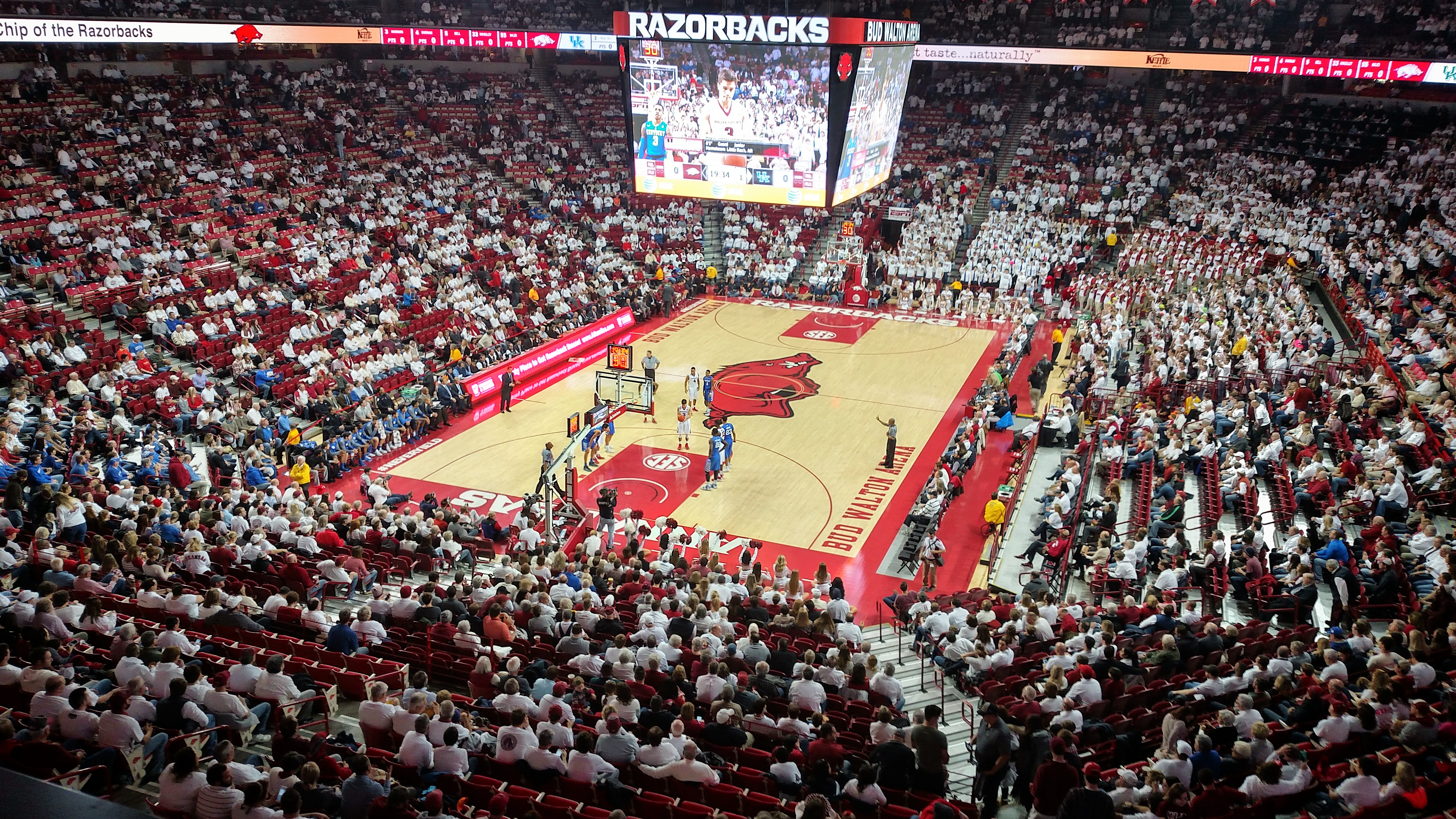
Calipari earned his first win in Bud Walton Arena in January

Kentucky opened conference play against Ole Miss on January 2 at Rupp Arena. Kentucky defeated the Rebels 83–61 behind 20 points and 10 assists from Ulis. On January 5 Kentucky traveled to Baton Rouge to face LSU. LSU defeated Kentucky 61–83 giving Kentucky its first SEC regular season loss since March 2014. Coming off the loss to LSU the team traveled to Tuscaloosa to face off against Alabama. Behind a career high from Poythress (25) Kentucky defeated the Tide 77–61. On January 12 Kentucky returned to Rupp Arena defeat Mississippi State 80–74 behind 22 points from Murray. On January 16 Kentucky traveled to Auburn to play Auburn. Despite a 12-point second half lead, Kentucky lost to the Tigers for the first time in the last nineteen games 70–75. On January 21 Kentucky traveled to Fayetteville to play Arkansas. Behind a career-high 24 points from Ulis, Kentucky defeated Arkansas 80–66. The victory gave Calipari a victory in every SEC arena since becoming Kentucky's head coach in 2009–10. Two days later Kentucky returned to Rupp Arena to defeat Vanderbilt 76–57 behind 21 points from Ulis. On January 28 Kentucky hosted Missouri before their last non-conference game of the season. Kentucky defeated the Tigers 88–54 behind 20 points from Ulis and 18 points from Willis. For their last non-conference regular season game of the season Kentucky traveled to Lawrence to face #4 Kansas in the Big 12/SEC Challenge. The Wildcats came up short against the Jayhawks with an 84–90 overtime loss in one of the toughest venues in all of college basketball.

=== February ===
On February 2 Kentucky traveled to Knoxville to face Tennessee. Despite having a 21-point lead in the first half, the Wildcats fell to the Volunteers 77–84. This was the largest lead that was lost in the John Calipari era at Kentucky. On February 6 Kentucky returned to Rupp Arena to host Florida. The Wildcats defeated the Gators 80–61 behind a career-high from Murray (35). Murray's 35 points ties for the most by a freshman in Kentucky history. On February 6 Kentucky defeated Georgia 82–48 behind 24 points from Murray. Kentucky held the Bulldogs without a made field goal for over 17 minutes. On February 13 Kentucky traveled to Columbia to face South Carolina. Despite Calipari being ejected with two technicals in the first minutes of the game, Kentucky dominated the Gamecocks 89–62. On February 18 Kentucky returned to Rupp Arena for a rematch with Tennessee. The Wildcats got revenge over the Volunteers with an 80–70 victory, their fourth in a row. On February 20 Kentucky traveled to College Station to face Texas A&M. The Wildcats fell to the Aggies in overtime 77–79 after a buzzer beating lay-up by A&M. On February 23 Kentucky returned to Rupp Arena for their second contest with Alabama. The Wildcats defeated the Crimson Tide 78–53 behind 23 points from Murray. On February 27 Kentucky traveled to Nashville to face Vanderbilt in their second contest of the season. The Commodores defeated Kentucky 62–74 despite 33 points from Murray.

=== March ===
On March 1 Kentucky traveled to Gainesville for their second contest against Florida. In their last road game of the season Kentucky defeated the Gators 88–79 behind 20 points from Murray, his seventh straight game of 20 or more points. The game also saw the reemergence of Labissiere, who made the most of his first start since December 12 by chipping in 11 points and eight rebounds. On March 5 Kentucky hosted LSU for their second contest against the Tigers. In their last regular season game of the season Kentucky defeated the Bayou Bengals 94–77 to claim a share of their 47th SEC regular-season title. Willis returned for his first game since February 20 due to a sprained right ankle. Murray scored 22 points, Labissiere added 18 and Poythress scored 12 in his last game at Rupp Arena.

=== Schedule ===
Date time, TV	Rank^{#}	Opponent^{#}	Result	Record	High points	High rebounds	High assists	Site (attendance) city, state
Exhibition
November 2, 2015*; 7:00 pm, SECN	No. 2	Ottawa	W 117–58	–	22 – Murray	12 – Murray	10 – Ulis	Rupp Arena (20,743); Lexington, KY
November 6, 2015*; 6:00 pm, ESPNU	No. 2	Kentucky State	W 111–58	–	22 – Labissière	11 – Lee	5 – Willis	Rupp Arena (21,328); Lexington, KY
Regular season
November 13, 2015*; 7:00 pm, SECN	No. 2	Albany	W 78–65	1–0	19 – Murray	8 – Lee	8 – Murray	Rupp Arena (22,080); Lexington, KY
November 14, 2015*; 7:00 pm, SECN	No. 2	NJIT	W 87–57	2–0	26 – Labissière	12 – Briscoe	5 – Ulis	Rupp Arena (22,671); Lexington, KY
November 17, 2015*; 7:30 pm, ESPN	No. 2	vs. No. 5 Duke; Champions Classic	W 74–63	3–0	18 – Ulis	10 – Lee	6 – Ulis	United Center (21,461); Chicago, IL
November 20, 2015*; 8:00 pm, SECN	No. 2	Wright State	W 78–63	4–0	21 – Ulis	10 – Poythress	5 – Ulis	Rupp Arena (22,563); Lexington, KY
November 24, 2015*; 9:00 pm, SECN	No. 1	Boston University; Hoophall Miami Invitational	W 82–62	5–0	16 – Labissière	10 – Poythress	6 – Ulis	Rupp Arena (22,623); Lexington, KY
November 27, 2015*; 5:00 pm, ESPN	No. 1	vs. South Florida; Hoophall Miami Invitational	W 84–63	6–0	21 – Murray	6 – Tied	7 – Briscoe	American Airlines Arena (10,023); Miami, FL
November 30, 2015*; 7:00 pm, ESPN2	No. 1	Illinois State	W 75–63	7–0	16 – Murray	12 – Lee	3 – Briscoe	Rupp Arena (21,894); Lexington, KY
December 3, 2015*; 9:00 pm, ESPN	No. 1	at UCLA	L 77–87	7–1	20 – Briscoe	6 – Tied	9 – Ulis	Pauley Pavilion (12,202); Los Angeles, CA
December 9, 2015*; 7:00 pm, ESPN2	No. 5	Eastern Kentucky	W 88–67	8–1	22 – Poythress	13 – Poythress	8 – Ulis	Rupp Arena (22,544); Lexington, KY
December 12, 2015*; 3:15 pm, ESPN	No. 5	Arizona State	W 72–58	9–1	17 – Murray	7 – Lee	6 – Ulis	Rupp Arena (23,665); Lexington, KY
December 19, 2015*; 3:30 pm, CBS	No. 4	vs. Ohio State; CBS Sports Classic	L 67–74	9–2	33 – Murray	9 – Lee	7 – Briscoe	Barclays Center (16,311); Brooklyn, NY
December 26, 2015*; 12:00 pm, CBS	No. 12	No. 16 Louisville; The Battle for the Bluegrass	W 75–73	10–2	21 – Ulis	7 – Lee	8 – Ulis	Rupp Arena (24,412); Lexington, KY
January 2, 2016; 7:00 pm, SECN	No. 10	Ole Miss	W 83–61	11–2 (1–0)	20 – Ulis	9 – Poythress	10 – Ulis	Rupp Arena (24,399); Lexington, KY
January 5, 2016; 9:00 pm, ESPN	No. 9	at LSU	L 67–85	11–3 (1–1)	23 – Ulis	8 – Mulder	6 – Ulis	Maravich Center (13,573); Baton Rouge, LA
January 9, 2016; 6:00 pm, SECN	No. 9	at Alabama	W 77–61	12–3 (2–1)	25 – Poythress	11 – Lee	8 – Ulis	Coleman Coliseum (15,383); Tuscaloosa, AL
January 12, 2016; 7:00 pm, ESPN	No. 14	Mississippi State	W 80–74	13–3 (3–1)	22 – Murray	9 – Lee	5 – Ulis, Briscoe	Rupp Arena (23,897); Lexington, KY
January 16, 2016; 4:00 pm, ESPN	No. 14	at Auburn	L 70–75	13–4 (3–2)	20 – Murray	12 – Willis	8 – Ulis	Auburn Arena (9,121); Auburn, AL
January 21, 2016; 7:00 pm, ESPN	No. 23	at Arkansas	W 80–66	14–4 (4–2)	24 – Ulis	7 – Tied	5 – Ulis	Bud Walton Arena (18,588); Fayetteville, AR
January 23, 2016; 4:00 pm, ESPN	No. 23	Vanderbilt	W 76–57	15–4 (5–2)	21 – Ulis	10 – Willis	5 – Ulis	Rupp Arena (22,975); Lexington, KY
January 27, 2016; 9:00 pm, SECN	No. 20	Missouri	W 88–54	16–4 (6–2)	20 – Ulis	12 – Willis	8 – Ulis	Rupp Arena (23,933); Lexington, KY
January 30, 2016*; 7:00 pm, ESPN	No. 20	at No. 4 Kansas; Big 12/SEC Challenge/ESPN College GameDay	L 84–90 ^{OT}	16–5	26 – Ulis	8 – Poythress	8 – Ulis	Allen Fieldhouse (16,300); Lawrence, Kansas
February 2, 2016; 7:00 pm, ESPN	No. 20	at Tennessee; Rivalry	L 77–84	16–6 (6–3)	20 – Ulis	8 – Tied	5 – Tied	Thompson-Boling Arena (19,295); Knoxville, TN
February 6, 2016; 4:00 pm, CBS	No. 20	Florida; Rivalry	W 80–61	17–6 (7–3)	35 – Murray	6 – Tied	11 – Ulis	Rupp Arena (24,406); Lexington, KY
February 9, 2016; 9:00 pm, ESPN	No. 22	Georgia	W 82–48	18–6 (8–3)	24 – Murray	7 – Labissiere	8 – Ulis	Rupp Arena (22,136); Lexington, KY
February 13, 2016; 12:00 pm, ESPN	No. 22	at South Carolina	W 89–62	19–6 (9–3)	27 – Ulis	13 – Lee	12 – Ulis	Colonial Life Arena (18,000); Columbia, SC
February 18, 2016; 7:00 pm, ESPN	No. 14	Tennessee; Rivalry	W 80–70	20–6 (10–3)	28 – Murray	10 – Briscoe	9 – Ulis	Rupp Arena (24,274); Lexington, KY
February 20, 2016; 6:30 pm, ESPN	No. 14	at Texas A&M; ESPN College GameDay	L 77–79 ^{OT}	20–7 (10–4)	22 – Ulis	12 – Humphries	11 – Ulis	Reed Arena (12,029); College Station, TX
February 23, 2016; 7:00 pm, ESPN	No. 16	Alabama	W 78–53	21–7 (11–4)	23 – Murray	12 – Lee	10 – Ulis	Rupp Arena (24,262); Lexington, KY
February 27, 2016; 4:00 pm, CBS	No. 16	at Vanderbilt	L 62–74	21–8 (11–5)	33 – Murray	9 – Murray	6 – Ulis	Memorial Gym (14,326); Nashville, TN
March 1, 2016; 7:00 pm, ESPN	No. 22	at Florida; Rivalry	W 88–79	22–8 (12–5)	21 – Murray	10 – Poythress	11 – Ulis	O'Connell Center (10,684); Gainesville, FL
March 5, 2016; 2:00 pm, CBS	No. 22	LSU	W 94–77	23–8 (13–5)	22 – Murray	10 – Lee	14 – Ulis	Rupp Arena (24,414); Lexington, KY
SEC Tournament
March 11, 2016; 8:00 pm, SECN	(2) No. 16	vs. (10) Alabama; Quarterfinals	W 85–59	24–8	23 – Murray	7 – Poythress	6 – Briscoe	Bridgestone Arena (18,049); Nashville, TN
March 12, 2016; 3:30 pm, ESPN	(2) No. 16	vs. (6) Georgia; Semifinals	W 93–80	25–8	26 – Murray	7 – Tied	2 – Tied	Bridgestone Arena (19,108); Nashville, TN
March 13, 2016; 1:00 pm, ESPN	(2) No. 16	vs. (1) No. 17 Texas A&M; Championship	W 82–77 ^{OT}	26–8	30 – Ulis	6 – Poythress	6 – Briscoe	Bridgestone Arena (19,613); Nashville, TN
NCAA tournament
March 17, 2016*; 9:40 pm, CBS	(4 E) No. 10	vs. (13 E) Stony Brook; First Round	W 85–57	27–8	19 – Murray	11 – Briscoe	7 – Ulis	Wells Fargo Arena (16,774); Des Moines, IA
March 19, 2016*; 5:15 pm, CBS	(4 E) No. 10	vs. (5 E) No. 14 Indiana; Second Round/Rivalry	L 67–73	27–9	27 – Ulis	7 – Murray	4 – Murray	Wells Fargo Arena (16,824); Des Moines, IA
*Non-conference game. ^{#}Rankings from AP Poll. (#) Tournament seedings in parentheses. E=East Region. All times are in Eastern Time.

== Honors ==
=== Watch lists ===
On January 13 Murray and Ulis were two of three SEC players (with Ben Simmons) named to the 25-man John R. Wooden Award midseason watchlist. On February 29 Ulis was named one of eleven finalists for the Oscar Robertson Trophy by the USBWA. Also on February 29 Murray was named one of five finalists for the Wayman Tisdale Award by the USBWA. On March 5 Ulis was one of fourteen players named as a Wooden Award finalist by the Los Angeles Athletic Club.

=== Weekly awards ===
On November 16 Labissiere was named SEC Freshman of the Week following a 26-point career-high against NJIT. On November 23 Ulis was named SEC Player of the Week following a victory over Duke. On December 7 Briscoe was named SEC Freshman of the Week after scoring 19 points in games against Illinois State and UCLA. On December 14 Murray was named SEC Freshman of the Week after 16.5 points, a guard-best 5.0 rebounds and 4.5 assists in wins over Eastern Kentucky and Arizona State. On December 28 Ulis was named the SEC Player of the Week after his performance against Louisville.

=== SEC Awards ===
Ulis was named SEC Player of the Year, the first Kentucky player since Anthony Davis in 2012. Ulis was also named SEC Defensive Player of the Year. Murray and Ulis were unanimous first-team All-SEC selections by coaches and the media. Murray was also named to the SEC All-Freshman Team. Following the victory over Texas A&M in the SEC Championship, Ulis was named MVP of the SEC Tournament.

=== All-American and national awards ===
Ulis was a consensus first-team All-American. The Associated Press named Ulis as a first-team All-American, and Murray as a third-team All-American. The USBWA named Ulis a second-team All-American. The NABC named Ulis a second-team All-American. The Sporting News named Ulis a first-team All-American.

== 2016 NBA draft ==
On April 1 the University of Kentucky held a press conference for Murray as he declared himself eligible for the 2016 NBA draft, and would forgo his remaining eligibility by signing with an agent. On April 5 Labissiere declared himself eligible for the draft, and would forgo his remaining eligibility by signing with an agent. On April 6 the University of Kentucky held a press conference for Ulis as he declared himself eligible for the draft, and would forgo his remaining eligibility by signing with an agent.

In the draft Murray was selected No. 7 by Denver. He was followed by Labissiere, who went to the Phoenix Suns at No. 28 and traded to the Sacramento Kings; In the second round Ulis was taken No. 34 by the Suns.

=== NBA draft selections ===
Year	Round	Pick	Overall	Player	NBA Club
2016	1	7	7	Jamal Murray	Denver Nuggets
2016	1	28	28	Skal Labissière	Phoenix Suns
2016	2	4	34	Tyler Ulis	Phoenix Suns

== See also ==
- 2015–16 Kentucky Wildcats women's basketball team
