= Tyler Ulis =

American basketball player and coach (born 1996)

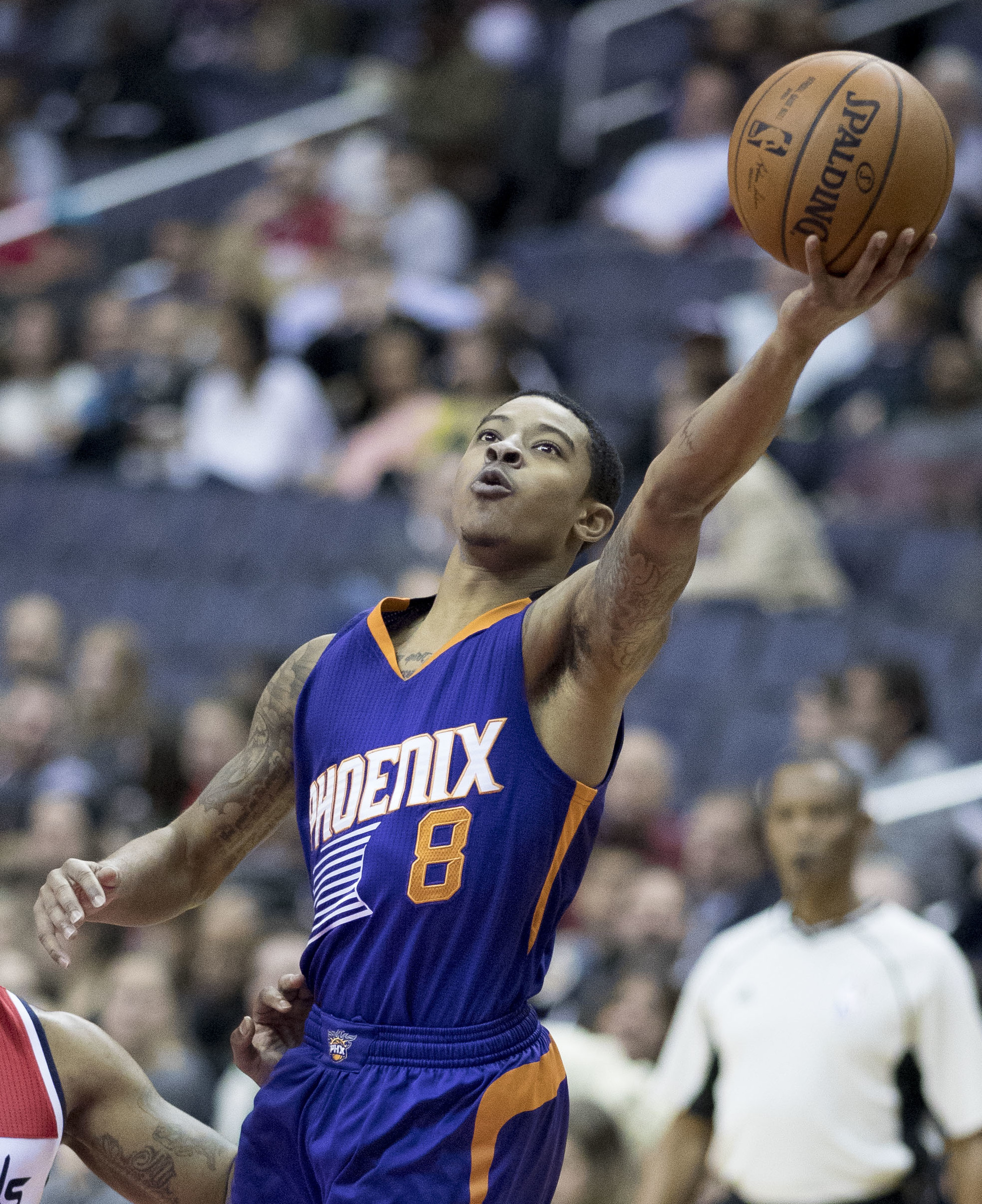
- Ulis with the Phoenix Suns in 2016

Arkansas Razorbacks
- Title: Assistant coach
- League: Southeastern Conference

Personal information
- Born: January 5, 1996 (age 30) Southfield, Michigan, U.S.
- Listed height: 5 ft 10 in (1.78 m)
- Listed weight: 160 lb (73 kg)

Career information
- High school: Marian Catholic (Chicago Heights, Illinois)
- College: Kentucky (2014–2016)
- NBA draft: 2016: 2nd round, 34th overall pick
- Drafted by: Phoenix Suns
- Playing career: 2016–2020
- Position: Point guard
- Number: 8, 0
- Coaching career: 2024–present

Career history

Playing
- 2016–2018: Phoenix Suns
- 2016: →Northern Arizona Suns
- 2018: Chicago Bulls
- 2018: →Windy City Bulls
- 2019–2020: Stockton Kings

Coaching
- 2024–present: Arkansas (assistant)

Career highlights
- Consensus first-team All-American (2016); Bob Cousy Award (2016); SEC Player of the Year (2016); SEC Defensive Player of the Year (2016); First-team All-SEC (2016); SEC All-Freshman Team (2015); SEC tournament MVP (2016); McDonald's All-American (2014)
- Stats at NBA.com
- Stats at Basketball Reference

Tyler Ulis (born January 5, 1996) is an American professional basketball coach and former player who is currently an assistant coach at the University of Arkansas. He played college basketball at the University of Kentucky. In 2015, he led his team in assists, made the 2015 SEC All-Freshman Team, and led the 2014–15 Kentucky team that won its first 38 games before losing to Wisconsin in the final four of the 2015 NCAA tournament. As a sophomore, Ulis was a Consensus first-team All-American and earned the Southeastern Conference Player of the Year and SEC Defensive Player of the Year recognition.

He played for Marian Catholic High School in Chicago Heights, Illinois. He was selected to play in both the 2014 McDonald's All-American Game and the 2014 Jordan Brand Classic. As a high school junior, he was a first team All-state selection, but he was overlooked by most top scouts until after his junior year of high school due to his height.

== Early life ==
Ulis was born in Southfield, Michigan (a Detroit suburb), and lived in Lima, Ohio, with his mother and younger brother, Ahron. He ran track as a youth, competing in the 800 meters and 1500 meters. He trained for basketball with his cousin and 2009 Big Ten Conference Defensive Player of the Year Travis Walton. Another of his cousins is Shareese Ulis, point guard for Cincinnati Lady Bearcats, who had been a two-time Toledo Blade Player of the Year. During his time in middle school, Ulis became friends with future Phoenix Suns teammate Devin Booker.

== High school career ==
For high school, Ulis moved to Matteson, Illinois, where he lived with his father, James. In Ohio, he had been used to winning a high percentage of his games. When he arrived at Marian Catholic, he started his first game as a freshman against future Illinois Fighting Illini men's basketball starting guard Tracy Abrams. He did not initially enjoy team success. As a freshman, he was 5 feet 3 inches (1.60 m) tall and was being recruited by opposing high schools. He reached 5 feet 8 inches (1.73 m) by late in his sophomore year and began being recruited by college basketball teams. By the beginning of his junior season, Marian Catholic was regarded as a serious contender thanks to Ulis.

Because of his height, Ulis was overlooked until well into the recruiting process for top basketball schools. He was not highly recruited until his 2013–14 senior year of high school. Among schools regarded as high-major programs, only Iowa and DePaul made him offers during his junior year. His other offers were from Dayton, Colorado State, Loyola, Northern Illinois and Oregon State. During his junior season, his stock soared and Marian Catholic started winning. In the March 2013 Illinois High School Association Class 4A sectional round, Marian Catholic vied against Bloom High School and then played Edwardsville High School in the supersectional round. Although Marian lost to a much taller Edwardsville team, it established a school record for wins with a 29–4 record and it won its IHSA sectional for the first time. Ulis finished fourth in the Illinois Mr. Basketball balloting behind Jabari Parker, Jahlil Okafor and Malcolm Hill. He was a first team All-state selection by the Chicago Tribune along with Parker, Okafor, Cliff Alexander and Jalen Brunson.

"[Kentucky made the list because] of the success they have had there recently...John Calipari has produced the most point guards in recent years and has taken them right to the NBA. He obviously knows how to coach point guards. He knows how to put them in positions to lead the team. He’s a tough coach. There’s accountability from Day 1 to win and win at a high level."

— Ulis' father, James Ulis

By August 8, 2013, when he was ranked as the 38th-best prospect in the national class of 2014 and its eighth-best point guard by ESPN, he had several offers and named Iowa, Kentucky (although he did not have an offer from them at the time), Michigan State and USC as his finalists (eliminating DePaul, Florida State, Northwestern and Purdue). Walton, Tyler's cousin, had played for Michigan State. He received an official offer from Kentucky on August 16. In early September, Ulis announced that he would not take an official visit to USC and had eliminated them from consideration. On September 13, Ulis committed to Kentucky. Subsequently, Tyus Jones canceled his September 27–29 official visit to Kentucky.

Ulis entered his senior season as one of the five favorites to win Illinois Mr. Basketball (along with Okafor, Alexander, Brunson and Keita Bates-Diop). On December 7, 2013, at the UIC Pavilion in the Chicago Elite Classic, Ulis and Marion suffered one of their only two regular season losses to USC-bound guard Jordan McLaughlin and Etiwanda High School, which was ranked number 6 nationally by USA Today. Ulis had 30 points, 7 assists and 5 rebounds. The January 25, 2014, matchup against junior Brunson and Stevenson High School was widely anticipated in the local press as the matchup of the two best point guards in the state. Stevenson won as Brunson had 32 points on 9-for-15 field goal shooting and an 11-for-14 free throw performance. Ulis had 23 points and 9 assists, including 18 points and 3 assists in the final eight minutes, but was only 5-for-20 from the field for the game. Ulis posted a career-high 42 points on February 22 against Lake Forest High School to go along with 6 steals, 6 rebounds and 5 assists.

During his senior year, Marian was the number 1 seed in the Thornton sectional of the IHSA Class 4A tournament. On March 11, Ulis had 40 points to lead Marian past Bloom High School 66–45. In the game, which was a rematch from the prior year, he made his first six shots, all three-pointers. On March 18, Marian lost its supersectional rematch against Edwardsville in overtime, again falling one game short of reaching the final four in Peoria, Illinois and finishing with a 28–3 record. In the game, Ulis, who had 23 points and 4 assists, tied the score with 21 seconds in regulation and with 50 seconds left in overtime. In the April 18 Jordan Brand Classic, Ulis posted 9 points and 9 assists.

=== Awards and honors ===
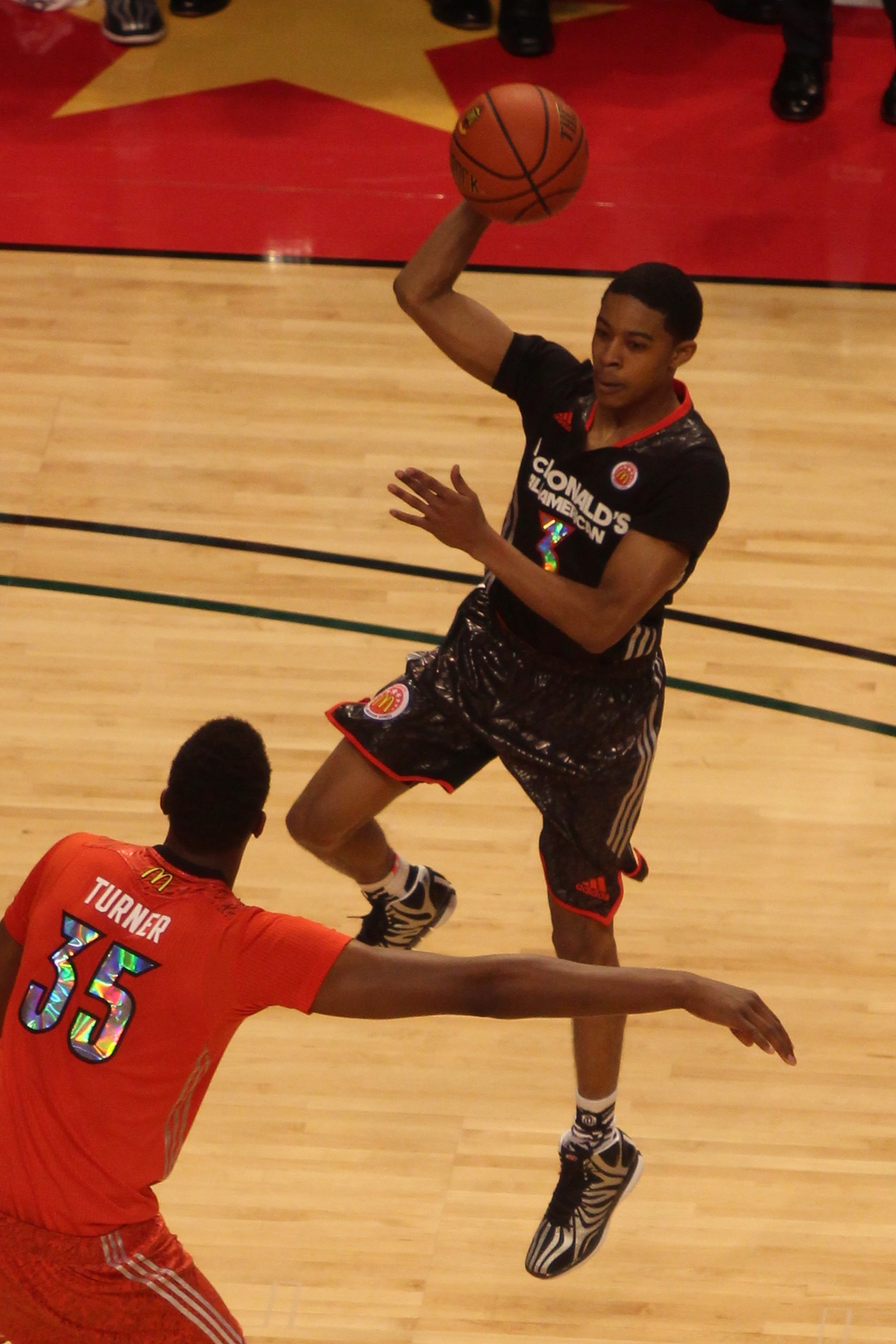
Ulis at the 2014 McDonald's All-American Boys Game

He was selected to the 2014 McDonald's All-American Game on January 29 (along with fellow Chicagoans Okafor and Alexander as well as along with fellow Kentucky commits Karl-Anthony Towns, Trey Lyles and Devin Booker). On March 10 he was one of 26 players selected for the April 18, 2014 Jordan Brand Classic again along with fellow Chicagoans Okafor and Alexander as well as along with fellow Kentucky commits Towns, Lyles and Booker. He was named Associated Press Class 4A 1st team all-state with Alexander, Brunson, Okafor and Sean O'Mara. Ulis finished third to Okafor and Alexander in the Illinois Mr. Basketball voting. He was the runner-up in both the skills competition and the three-point contest at the McDonald's All-American Game. He was a 2014 USA Today third-team All-USA Boys Basketball Team selection.

The decision by Andrew Harrison and Aaron Harrison on whether to enter the 2014 NBA draft would be the determining factor on whether Ulis became an immediate starter or not. Many thought Andrew would be Calipari's seventh consecutive point guard to declare for the NBA draft after his freshman season, but that Ulis would likely last much longer at Kentucky. On April 25, the Harrisons announced that they would be returning to Kentucky.

College recruiting
Name	Hometown	School	Height	Weight	Commit date
Tyler Ulis; PG	Chicago Heights, IL	Marian Catholic (IL)	5 ft 8 in (1.73 m)	150 lb (68 kg)	Sep 13, 2013
Tyler Ulis; PG	Recruit ratings: Scout: Rivals: 247Sports: ESPN:				
Overall recruit ranking: Scout: 20, 3 (PG) Rivals: 21 ESPN: 25, 4 (IL), 4 (PG)
Note: In many cases, Scout, Rivals, 247Sports, On3, and ESPN may conflict in their listings of height and weight.; In these cases, the average was taken. ESPN grades are on a 100-point scale.; Sources: "Kentucky 2014 Basketball Commitments". Rivals.; "2014 Kentucky Basketball Commits". Scout.; "ESPN". ESPN.; "Scout.com Team Recruiting Rankings". Scout.; "2014 Team Ranking". Rivals.

== College career ==
=== Freshman season ===
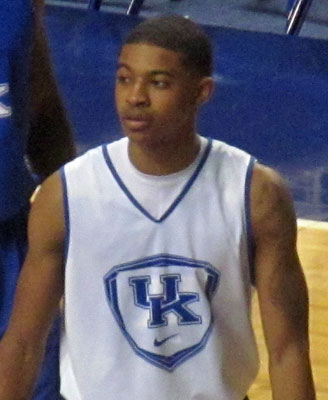
Ulis at the Kentucky Blue-White Scrimmage in 2014

During the offseason, Ulis wore a walking boot on his right foot following a pick-up game injury for precautionary reasons. Ulis was also named to the 36-man 2014–15 Bob Cousy Award preseason watchlist and the Wayman Tisdale Award watchlist. Ulis quickly earned a reputation as a difference maker whose contributions may not be obvious in the statistics. On December 10, he was sidelined with an injury. Ulis posted a season-high 14 points on December 27 against Louisville in the Kentucky–Louisville rivalry game known as the Battle For The Bluegrass, earning the MVP of the game from the Bluegrass Sports Commission. On December 29, his effort was recognized with an SEC Freshman of the Week honor. Ulis did not start in any his 37 games played as a freshman, but averaged 23.8 minutes played. Following the season, he was named to the 8-man 2015 SEC All-Freshman Team. Kentucky went undefeated in its first 38 games before losing to Wisconsin in the Final Four of the 2015 NCAA men's Division I basketball tournament. Ulis led the team in assists per game.

=== Sophomore season ===
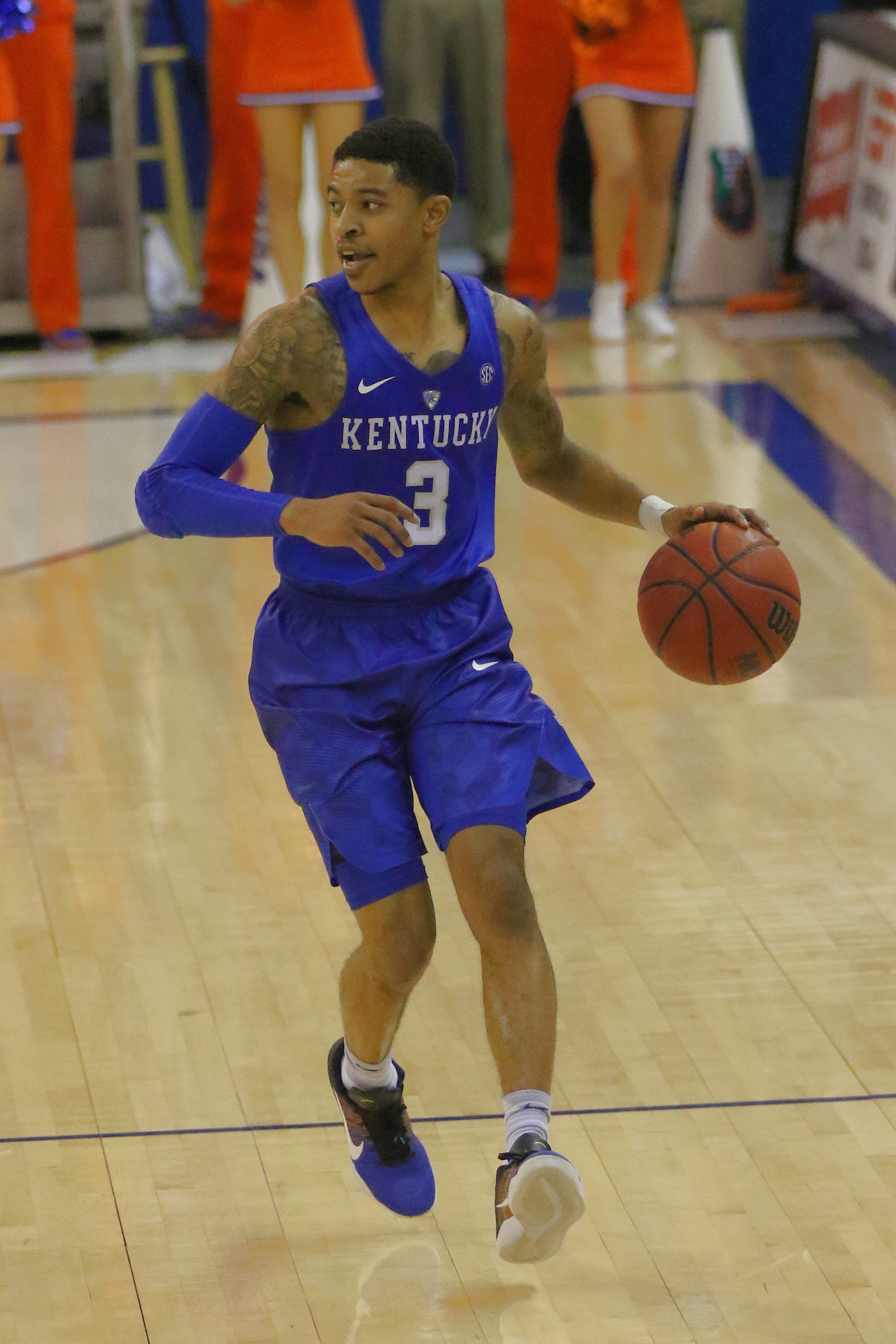
Ulis in March 2016

Ulis was a selection to the 20-man Bob Cousy Award preseason watchlist, and the 30-man Lute Olson Award preseason watchlist. He was also a 2015–16 Southeastern Conference preseason first team All-conference selection by the media. In preseason top-100 player rankings Ulis was ranked #5 by ESPN and #22 by NBC Sports. During the preseason, Mike Rutherford of SB Nation selected Ulis as one of its 10 most important college basketball players for 2015–16. He made the initial 50-man John R. Wooden Award watchlist on November 17. On December 2, Ulis earned recognition on the 50-man Naismith College Player of the Year watchlist and 33-man Robertson Trophy watchlists.

Ulis opened the season in the starting lineup against the Albany Great Danes on November 13. On November 17, Ulis posted game-high and career-high 18 points as well as game-high 6 assists with no turnovers in 40 minutes of play in a victory over the defending national champion Duke Blue Devils in the Champions Classic. He posted a game-high and career-high 21 points as well as a game-high 5 assists on November 21 against Wright State. As a result, on November 23, he earned SEC Co-Player of the Week (along with Kenny Gaines). In Kentucky's 2015–16 Southeastern Conference men's basketball season opener against the Ole Miss Rebels on January 2, Ulis posted 20 points and 10 assists. The game marked Ulis' first collegiate double-double and Kentucky's first 20-point and 10-assist performance since John Wall posted one on November 21, 2009. On January 5, Ulis posted his third straight 20-point performance with a career-high 23 points in a loss against the Ben Simmons-led LSU Tigers. On January 13, Ulis was among the 25 players included in the John R. Wooden Award Midseason Top 25 Watch List. On January 21, Ulis went 14–15 from the free throw line and 2–3 on three-point shots to post 24 against Arkansas. Ulis was named to the January 25, 20-man Oscar Robertson Trophy midseason watch list. On January 30, Ulis posted a career-high 26 points and 8 assists against #4-ranked Kansas, but Kentucky lost in overtime. On February 1, Ulis was named one of 10 finalists for the Bob Cousy Point Guard of the Year Award. Entering play on February 13, Kentucky and South Carolina were tied atop of the 2015–16 Southeastern Conference standings. In a game between the two, Ulis posted new career highs with 27 points and 12 assists, leading the team to an 89–62 victory, after coach Calipari was ejected early. He was named to the 35-man midseason watchlist for the Naismith Trophy on February 11. Ulis was included in the Wooden Award Late season Top 20 Watch List on February 12. On February 15, Ulis earned SEC Player of the Week honors again. On February 29, Ulis was among the 11 finalists for the Robertson Trophy. On March 5, Ulis closed out the regular season with a career-high 14 assists and 14 points against the LSU Tigers.

Following the 2015–16 Southeastern Conference men's basketball season, Ulis was named the SEC Player of the Year by both SEC head coaches and the Associated Press, and was also named by the coaches as SEC Defensive Player of the Year (the AP does not select this award, or an SEC all-defensive team). He placed on both voting bodies' All-Conference first teams, and was named to the coaches' All-SEC defensive team. He was the second player (after Anthony Davis) to earn both the SEC Player of the Year and SEC Defensive Player of the Year honors in the same season. Ulis earned broad 2016 NCAA Men's Basketball All-Americans recognition. He was a first team selection by USA Today, ESPN, Sports Illustrated, NBC Sports, Associated Press, CBS Sports and The Sporting News; He was a second-team selection by the USBWA and NABC. Ulis was named one of four finalists for the Naismith Trophy on March 20. He was named one of 10 finalists for the Wooden Award on March 29. When naming Ulis to its All-American team, Associated Press described Ulis as the shortest All-American since Johnny O'Brien in 1953. Ulis won the Bob Cousy Award.

In the 2016 SEC men's basketball tournament, Ulis scored 25 points and had 4 assists in the semifinal victory over Georgia on March 12. In the finals against regular season co-champion Texas A&M on March 13, Ulis posted a career-high 30 points. He played all 45 minutes of the overtime contest. Ulis was tournament MVP. In the 2016 NCAA men's Division I basketball tournament, Kentucky renewed its rivalry with Indiana in the round of 32 on March 19. Ulis posted 27 points in the 73–67 loss to the 2015–16 Hoosiers.

== Professional career ==
=== Phoenix Suns (2016–2018) ===
At the conclusion of his sophomore season, Ulis announced his intention to forgo his final two seasons of eligibility and enter the 2016 NBA draft. During the 2016 NBA Draft Combine, Ulis was not only the second-shortest player to participate in the event (behind only Kay Felder, who measured at 5'9½" with shoes on (5'8½" without shoes) as opposed to an even 5'10" with shoes on (5'8¾" without them)), but he was also the lightest-recorded player in draft combine history at 149 pounds (68 kg), which affected his draft stock. Furthermore, about two weeks before the draft began, it was revealed that Ulis had a problem with his hip that may one day require surgery. As a result, his draft stock declined from being an expected mid-first-round selection to being either a projected late-first-round or early-second-round selection. Ulis downplayed the issue, claiming that his hip was just fine. However, Ulis was selected by the Phoenix Suns in the second round with the 34th selection, being reunited with his best friend and former college teammate Devin Booker in the process. On July 7, he signed with the Suns and joined the team for the 2016 NBA Summer League. Ulis received the equivalent of a late first-round pick's contract, starting at around $1 million and having the same two guaranteed years with two team option years. In the Summer League, his play compared favorably to the four point guards who were taken in the first round. Over six games at the Las Vegas Summer League, he averaged 14.5 points and 6.3 assists per game, subsequently earning All-NBA Summer League Second Team honors.

==== 2016–17 season ====
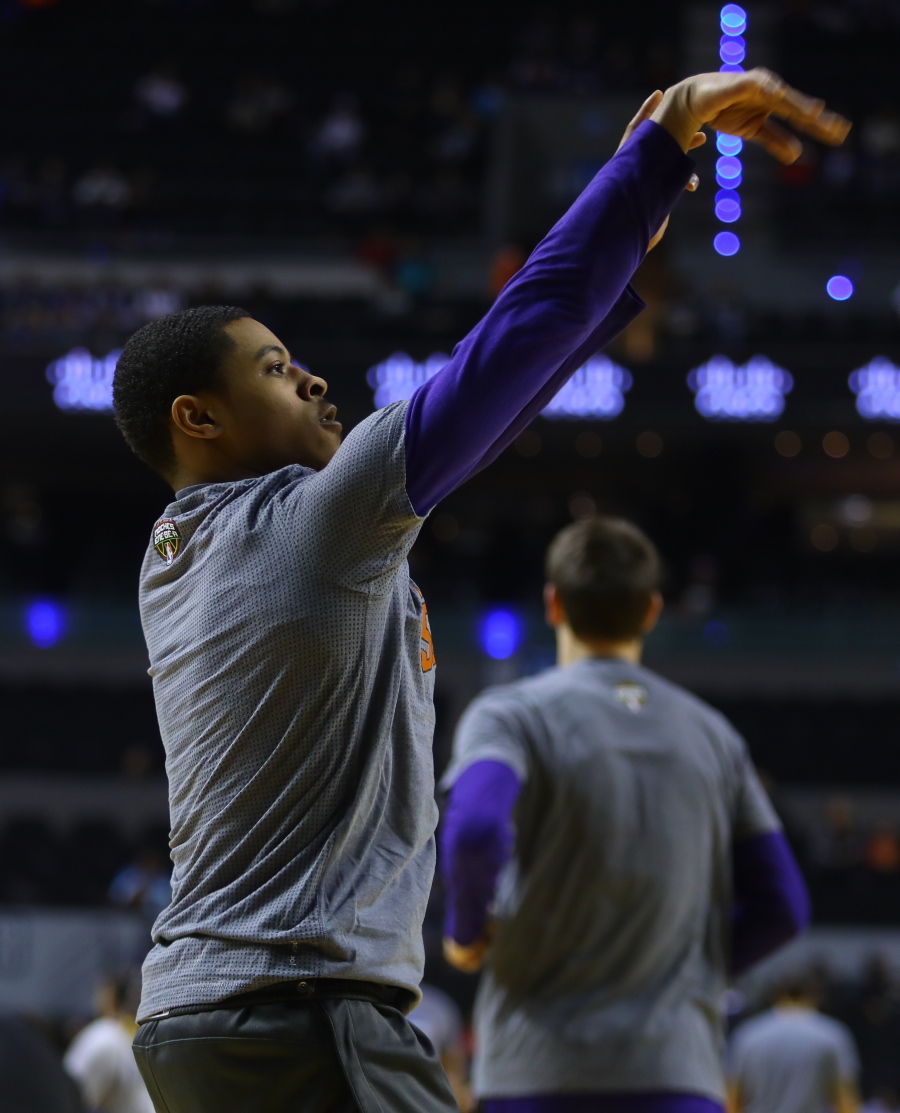
Ulis with the Phoenix Suns in 2017

Ulis debuted with the Suns on October 26, 2016, against the Sacramento Kings. He posted 2 points, a rebound, an assist, a steal and a block in 13 minutes of action during the blowout loss, but was on the court as Phoenix cut the deficit from 26 to 10 points at one point. His play in mop-up time earned him a role in the second unit. On October 31, Ulis posted a team-high 6 assists in 18 minutes of play against the Los Angeles Clippers. On November 18, he scored a season-high 10 points and 4 steals in a 116–96 win over the Indiana Pacers. He matched the 4 steals and added 4 rebounds the next night against the Philadelphia 76ers. On December 14, he was assigned to the Northern Arizona Suns of the NBA Development League. He managed to record 13 points, 9 assists and 5 rebounds in a loss to the Santa Cruz Warriors before returning to Phoenix to play against the San Antonio Spurs the next day.

On December 29, he matched his season and career high with 10 points in 15 minutes in a 99–91 win over the Toronto Raptors. On February 8, there was an oncourt altercation between the Suns and the Memphis Grizzlies resulting in suspensions and fines, including a $15,000 fine for Ulis (who came to the defense of Booker). On February 11, 2017, Ulis recorded a career-high 13 points and tied another career high with six assists in a 133–102 loss to the Houston Rockets. On February 17, he had his number retired at Marian Catholic.

Following the break for the 2017 NBA All-Star Game, Ulis was moved into the main rotation of players ahead of Brandon Knight. In his new role, Ulis set new career highs in assists on February 28 against Memphis (7), and March 2 against Charlotte (8); and new career highs in points on March 3 against Oklahoma City (14) and March 5 against Boston (20, including a buzzer-beating, game-winning three-point shot). Ulis helped improve the team's assist production post All-Star break from 18.6 assists per game (tied for last in the NBA) prior to the break to 24.8 per game in the first two weeks after the break. Ulis received his first NBA start (in place of an injured, resting Eric Bledsoe) on March 15 against the Sacramento Kings and former Kentucky teammate Skal Labissière, who had a career-high 32 points. Ulis record his first career double-double with 13 points and a season-high 13 assists in a 107–101 loss against the Kings. Ulis became the first Suns rookie with at least 12 points and 12 assists in a game since Steve Nash in November 1996. Two days later, Ulis, making his second career NBA start, scored 19 points and added eight assists in a 109–103 loss to Orlando Magic. On March 30, he had 16 points and matched his career best with 13 assists in a 124–118 loss to the Clippers.

On April 2, he had a near-triple-double with career highs of 34 points and nine rebounds as well as nine assists in a 123–116 loss to the Houston Rockets. The 34 points was a 2016–17 season single-game high for all NBA rookies.

Ulis was subsequently named Western Conference Rookie of the Month for April, becoming the second Suns rookie to win the award during the 2016–17 season (after Marquese Chriss in January). It was the first time two different Suns earned the award in the same season since the 1987–88 NBA season. Ulis ended April by leading all rookies in points (20.7) and assists (6.8), while also recording 3.8 rebounds. His average of 20.7 points and 6.8 assists was the most by an NBA rookie in a month since Damian Lillard in March 2013. While he averaged 7.3 points, 3.7 assists and 1.6 rebounds in 61 games for the season, he averaged 16.1 points and 8.5 assists in games that he started. Ulis finished 14th in the voting for the 10-man NBA All-Rookie team.

==== 2017–18 season ====
On May 10, 2017, Ulis had surgery performed on his right ankle by Dr. Martin O'Malley at the Hospital for Special Surgery in New York City. He subsequently missed the 2017 NBA Summer League, but returned in time for the start of training camp. Ulis made his first start of the season on November 11, 2017, in a 118–110 win over the Minnesota Timberwolves. Six days later, in their 122–113 win over the Los Angeles Lakers, Ulis was involved in a late-game shoving match with Lakers guard Kentavious Caldwell-Pope. Ulis recorded his first double-double of the season with 12 points and a season-high 12 assists in a 115–101 win over the Philadelphia 76ers on December 4. Ulis posted a career-high 5 steals on January 29 against the Memphis Grizzlies.

After missing the first 8 games after the 2018 NBA All-Star Weekend, Ulis had extended playing time on March 10, 2018, when T. J. Warren, Booker and Josh Jackson were all sidelined, recording a double-double of 11 points and 10 assists in a 122–115 loss to the Charlotte Hornets. On March 26, he scored a season-high 19 points in a 102–94 loss to the Boston Celtics. He had a 23-point effort two days later against the Los Angeles Clippers.

On June 30, 2018, Ulis was waived by the Suns. He later signed with the Golden State Warriors on September 24, 2018, before being waived on October 12.

=== Chicago Bulls (2018) ===
On October 15, 2018, Ulis was claimed off waivers by the Chicago Bulls, joining the team on a two-way contract with the Windy City Bulls of the NBA G League. Ulis posted game highs of 25 points and 7 assists in Windy City's season-opening 96–71 victory against the Lakeland Magic on November 2. On December 21, 2018, Ulis was reported to have undergone a left hip arthroscopy. On December 27, 2018, Ulis was waived by the Bulls.

=== Stockton Kings (2019–2020) ===
On September 24, 2019, Ulis signed with the Sacramento Kings. On October 20, Ulis was waived by the Kings. He ultimately landed with Sacramento's G League affiliate, the Stockton Kings. Ulis averaged 6.8 points and 3.8 assists per game with Stockton.

In October 2021, Ulis joined the Santa Cruz Warriors. However, he was waived on November 4, before appearing in a single game.

=== Return to Kentucky ===
While recuperating from a February 2022 car accident, he re-enrolled as a full-time student at Kentucky to work towards his degree during the 2022–23 academic year, making him eligible to be hired as a student assistant coach for the team. In late December, he joined the team in that role.

On September 20, 2024, Ulis joined the Arkansas Razorbacks as a basketball assistant.

== Career statistics ==
Legend
GP	Games played	GS	Games started	MPG	Minutes per game
FG%	Field goal percentage	3P%	3-point field goal percentage	FT%	Free throw percentage
RPG	Rebounds per game	APG	Assists per game	SPG	Steals per game
BPG	Blocks per game	PPG	Points per game	**Bold**	Career high

=== NBA ===
Year	Team	GP	GS	MPG	FG%	3P%	FT%	RPG	APG	SPG	BPG	PPG
2016–17	Phoenix	61	15	18.4	**.421**	.266	.775	1.6	3.7	.8	**.1**	7.3
2017–18	Phoenix	**71**	**43**	**23.4**	.388	**.288**	**.832**	**1.8**	**4.4**	**1.0**	**.1**	**7.7**
2018–19	Chicago	1	0	1.0	–	–	–	.0	.0	.0	.0	.0
Career		133	58	20.9	.403	.280	.808	1.7	4.0	.9	.1	7.5

=== College ===
Year	Team	GP	GS	MPG	FG%	3P%	FT%	RPG	APG	SPG	BPG	PPG
2014–15	Kentucky	**37**	0	23.8	.406	**.429**	.808	1.8	3.6	1.0	**.1**	5.6
2015–16	Kentucky	35	**35**	**36.8**	**.434**	.344	**.856**	**3.0**	**7.0**	**1.5**	**.1**	**17.3**
Career		72	35	30.1	.427	.371	.846	2.4	5.3	1.2	.1	11.3

== Personal life ==
In February 2022, Ulis endured a head-on collision in a car crash.
