= 2015–16 NCAA Division I men's basketball rankings =

- Season: 2015–16
- NCAA Tournament: 2016
- Preseason No. 1: North Carolina; Kentucky
- NCAA Tournament Champions: Villanova
NCAA Division I men's basketball rankings


Two human polls make up the 2015–16 NCAA Division I men's basketball rankings, the AP Poll and the Coaches Poll, in addition to various publications' preseason polls.

== Legend ==
	Increase in ranking
	Decrease in ranking
	New to rankings from previous week
Italics	Number of first place votes
(#–#)	Win–loss record
т	Tied with team above or below also with this symbol

== AP Poll ==
	Preseason Nov 2	Week 2 Nov 16	Week 3 Nov 23	Week 4 Nov 30	Week 5 Dec 7	Week 6 Dec 14	Week 7 Dec 21	Week 8 Dec 28	Week 9 Jan 4	Week 10 Jan 11	Week 11 Jan 18	Week 12 Jan 25	Week 13 Feb 1	Week 14 Feb 8	Week 15 Feb 15	Week 16 Feb 22	Week 17 Feb 29	Week 18 Mar 7	Week 19 Mar 14	
1.	North Carolina (35)	North Carolina (2–0) (37)	Kentucky (4–0) (59)	Kentucky (6–0) (59)	Michigan State (9–0) (62)	Michigan State (11–0) (64)	Michigan State (12–0) (64)	Michigan State (13–0) (64)	Kansas (12–1) (44)	Kansas (14–1) (63)	Oklahoma (15–1) (65)	Oklahoma (16–2) (36)	Oklahoma (18–2) (45)	Villanova (20–3) (32)	Villanova (22–3) (44)	Villanova (24–3) (45)	Kansas (25–4) (63)	Kansas (27–4) (63)	Kansas (30–4) (63)	1.
2.	Kentucky (10)	Kentucky (2–0) (8)	Maryland (3–0) (6)	Maryland (6–0) (4)	Kansas (6–1) (1)	Kansas (8–1) (1)	Kansas (9–1) (1)	Kansas (10–1) (1)	Oklahoma (12–0) (21)	Oklahoma (13–1) (1)	North Carolina (16–2)	North Carolina (18–2) (29)	North Carolina (19–2) (20)	Maryland (21–3) (13)	Kansas (21–4) (21)	Kansas (23–4) (20)	Michigan State (24–5) (2)	Michigan State (26–5)(2)	Michigan State (29–5) (2)	2.
3.	Maryland (14)	Maryland (1–0) (14)	Michigan State (3–0)	Michigan State (7–0) (2)	North Carolina (7–1) (2)	Oklahoma (7–0)	Oklahoma (8–0)	Oklahoma (11–0)	Maryland (13–1)	Maryland (15–1)	Kansas (15–2)	Iowa (16–3)	Villanova (18–3)	Oklahoma (19–3) (7)	Oklahoma (20–4)	Oklahoma (21–5)	Villanova (25–4)	Villanova (27–4)	North Carolina (28–6)	3.
4.	Kansas (5)	Kansas (1–0) (5)	Iowa State (2–0)	Kansas (4–1)	Iowa State (6–0)	Kentucky (9–1)	Maryland (10–1)	Maryland (11–1)	Virginia (12–1)	Michigan State (16–1) (1)	Villanova (16–2)	Kansas (16–3)	Maryland (19–3)	Iowa (19–4) (11)	Iowa (20–5)	Virginia (21–5)	Virginia (22–6)	Virginia (24–6)	Virginia (26–7)	4.
5.	Duke	Duke (2–0)	Kansas (1–1)	Iowa State (5–0)	Kentucky (7–1)	Iowa State (9–0)	Virginia (9–1)	Virginia (10–1)	Michigan State (14–1)	North Carolina (15–2)	Xavier (16–1)	Texas A&M (17–2)	Iowa (17–4)	Xavier (21–2)	North Carolina (21–4)	Xavier (24–3)	Xavier (25–4)	Xavier (26–4)	Oregon (28–6)	5.
6.	Virginia	Virginia (1–0) (1)	Duke (4–1)	Oklahoma (4–0)	Maryland (7–1)	Maryland (9–1)	Xavier (11–0)	Xavier (12–0)	North Carolina (13–2)	Villanova (14–2)	West Virginia (15–2)	Villanova (17–3)	Xavier (19–2)	Kansas (19–4) (1)	Maryland (22–4)	Michigan State (22–5)	Oklahoma (22–6)	Oklahoma (24–6)	Villanova (29–5)	6.
7.	Iowa State	Iowa State (1–0)	Oklahoma (2–0)	Duke (6–1)	Oklahoma (5–0)	Duke (8–1)	North Carolina (9–2)	North Carolina (10–2)	Arizona (13–1)	Xavier (14–1)	Maryland (15–2)	Xavier (17–2)	Kansas (17–4)	Virginia (19–4) (1)	Virginia (20–5)	North Carolina (22–5)	Miami (FL) (23–5)	North Carolina (25–6)	Oklahoma (25–7)	7.
8.	Oklahoma	Oklahoma (0–0)	Villanova (4–0)	Villanova (6–0)	Duke (8–1)	Virginia (8–1)	Arizona (11–1)	Arizona (12–1)	Providence (14–1)	Miami (FL) (13–1)	SMU (17–0)	Maryland (17–3)	Texas A&M (18–3)	Michigan State (20–4)	Xavier (22–3) т	Iowa (20–6)	North Carolina (23–6)	Oregon (25–6)	West Virginia (26–8)	8.
9.	Gonzaga	Wichita State (1–0)	North Carolina (3–1)	North Carolina (5–1)	Villanova (7–0)	Purdue (11–0)	Butler (9–1)	Butler (10–1)	Kentucky (11–2)	Duke (14–2)	Iowa (14–3)	West Virginia (16–3)	Virginia (17–4)	North Carolina (19–4)	Michigan State (21–5) т	Arizona (22–5)	Oregon (23–6)	West Virginia (24–7)	Xavier (26–8)	9.
10.	Wichita State	Gonzaga (0–0)	Gonzaga (2–0)	Virginia (5–1)	Virginia (7–1)	Xavier (10–0)	Providence (11–1)	Kentucky (10–2)	Xavier (13–1)	SMU (15–0)	Texas A&M (15–2)	Providence (17–3)	Michigan State (19–4)	West Virginia (19–4)	West Virginia (20–5)	Maryland (23–5)	West Virginia (22–7)	Indiana (25–6)	Kentucky (26–8) т	10.
11.	Villanova	Villanova (1–0)	Arizona (4–0)	Purdue (6–0)	Purdue (8–0)	North Carolina (7–2)	Iowa State (9–1)	Iowa State (10–1)	Villanova (12–2)	West Virginia (14–1)	Michigan State (16–3)	Virginia (15–4)	Providence (18–4)	Oregon (20–4)	Miami (FL) (20–4)	Louisville (21–6)	Louisville (22–7)	Miami (FL) (24–6)	Miami (FL) (25–7) т	11.
12.	Arizona	Arizona (1–0)	Virginia (4–1)	Xavier (7–0)	Xavier (8–0)	Villanova (8–1)	Kentucky (9–2)	Providence (12–1)	Miami (FL) (12–1)	Providence (14–2)	Arizona (15–3)	Michigan State (17–4)	SMU (19–1)	Miami (FL) (18–4)	Arizona (21–5)	Miami (FL) (21–5)	Indiana (23–6)	Utah (24–7)	Purdue (26–8)	12.
13.	Michigan State	Michigan State (1–0)	Indiana (3–0)	Gonzaga (4–1)	Arizona (7–1)	Arizona (9–1)	Miami (FL) (9–1)	Miami (FL) (10–1)	Iowa State (11–2)	Virginia (12–3)	Virginia (13–4)	SMU (18–1)	Iowa State (16–5)	Louisville (19–4)	Iowa State (18–7)	Oregon (21–6)	Utah (23–7)	Purdue (24–7)	Utah (26–8)	13.
14.	California	Indiana (1–0)	California (3–0)	Syracuse (6–0)	West Virginia (7–0)	Providence (10–1)	Purdue (11–1)	Purdue (12–1)	Duke (12–2)	Kentucky (12–3)	Baylor (14–3)	Iowa State (15–4)	West Virginia (17–4)	Iowa State (17–6)	Kentucky (19–6)	West Virginia (20–7)	Maryland (23–6)	Louisville (23–8)	Indiana (25–7)	14.
15.	Indiana	California (1–0)	Miami (FL) (5–0)	Oregon (5–0)	Providence (8–1)	Miami (FL) (8–1)	Duke (9–2)	Duke (9–2)	SMU (13–0)	Texas A&M (13–2)	Miami (FL) (13–3)	Miami (FL) (15–3)	Baylor (17–4)	Texas A&M (18–5)	Dayton (21–3)	Duke (20–7)	Purdue (22–7)	Arizona (24–7)	Texas A&M (26–8)	15.
16.	Utah	Utah (1–0)	Purdue (5–0)	Vanderbilt (5–1)	Baylor (6–1)	Baylor (7–1)	Louisville (9–1)	Villanova (9–2)	Louisville (12–2)	Iowa (12–3)	Providence (15–3)	Louisville (16–3)	Oregon (18–4)	SMU (20–2)	Oregon (20–6)	Kentucky (20–7)	Iowa (20–8)	Kentucky (23–8)	Louisville (23–8)	16.
17.	Wisconsin	Vanderbilt (1–0)	Notre Dame (3–0)	Cincinnati (7–0)	Miami (FL) (7–1)	Butler (8–1)	Villanova (8–2)	SMU (11–0)	West Virginia (12–1)	Iowa State (12–3)	Louisville (14–3)	Baylor (15–4)	Miami (FL) (16–4)	Arizona (19–5)	Purdue (20–6)	Iowa State (19–8)	Duke (21–8)	Texas A&M (24–7)	Arizona (25–8)	17.
18.	Vanderbilt	Notre Dame (1–0)	UConn (3–0)	Texas A&M (6–1)	Butler (6–1)	SMU (7–0)	SMU (9–0)	Louisville (11–2)	Butler (11–3)	Arizona (13–3)	Butler (13–4)	Arizona (16–4)	Purdue (19–4)	Purdue (19–5)	Louisville (19–6)	Indiana (22–6)	Arizona (22–7)	Maryland (24–7)	Maryland (25–8)	18.
19.	Notre Dame	UConn (1–0)	Vanderbilt (3–0)	Arizona (6–1)	SMU (6–0)	Louisville (7–1)	West Virginia (9–1)	West Virginia (10–1)	Iowa (11–3)	South Carolina (15–0)	Iowa State (13–4)	Indiana (17–3)	Louisville (17–4)	Dayton (19–3)	Notre Dame (18–7)	Baylor (20–7)	Baylor (21–8)	Duke (22–9)	Duke (23–10)	19.
20.	UConn	Baylor (1–0)	Wichita State (2–1)	West Virginia (6–0)	Gonzaga (5–2)	West Virginia (8–1)	George Washington (9–1)	Texas A&M (9–2)	Purdue (13–2)	Pittsburgh (14–1)	Duke (14–4)	Kentucky (15–4)	Kentucky (16–5)	Providence (18–6)	Duke (19–6)	Purdue (21–7)	Texas A&M (22–7)	Iowa (21–9)	Seton Hall (25–8)	20.
21.	LSU	Purdue (2–0)	Oregon (4–0)	Miami (FL) (5–1)	Vanderbilt (6–2)	George Washington (9–1)	Texas A&M (9–2)	Utah (10–2)	Texas A&M (11–2)	Louisville (13–3)	USC (15–3)	Purdue (17–4)	Wichita State (16–5)	Baylor (17–6)	SMU (21–3)	Texas A&M (20–7)	Iowa State (20–9)	Iowa State (21–10)	Baylor (22–11)	21.
22.	Baylor	Butler (1–0)	LSU (3–0)	SMU (4–0)	Louisville (6–1)	UCLA (7–3)	Cincinnati (10–2)	Cincinnati (10–3)	South Carolina (12–0)	Baylor (12–3)	Purdue (15–3)	Wichita State (14–5)	Indiana (18–4)	Kentucky (17–6)	Indiana (20–6)	Utah (21–7)	Kentucky (21–8)	Baylor (21–10)	Iowa State (21–11)	22.
23.	Purdue	LSU (1–0)	Xavier (3–0)	Providence (6–1)	Cincinnati (8–1)	Cincinnati (8–2)	Baylor (8–2)	Baylor (9–2)	UConn (10–3)	Butler (12–4)	Kentucky (13–4)	Oregon (16–4)	Arizona (17–5)	USC (18–5)	Providence (19–7)	Notre Dame (18–8)	Texas (19–10)	Texas (20–11)	California (23–10)	23.
24.	Butler	Michigan (1–0)	Cincinnati (4–0)	Louisville (5–0)	Oregon (6–1)	Texas A&M (8–2)	Utah (9–2)	South Carolina (11–0)	Pittsburgh (12–1)	Purdue (14–3)	South Carolina (16–1)	Duke (15–5)	Dayton (18–3)	Texas (16–7)	Texas (16–9)	SMU (22–4)	SMU (24–4)	California (22–9)	SMU (25–5)	24.
25.	Michigan	Oregon (1–0)	Texas A&M (4–0) т; SMU (3–0) т	Baylor (4–1)	Utah (7–1)	UConn (6–3)	South Carolina (10–0)	UCLA (9–4)	Dayton (11–2)	Gonzaga (13–3)	Indiana (15–3)	Notre Dame (14–5)	South Carolina (19–2)	Wichita State (17–6)	Baylor (18–7)	Texas (17–10)	California (21–8)	SMU (25–5)	Iowa (21–10)	25.
	Preseason Nov 2	Week 2 Nov 16	Week 3 Nov 23	Week 4 Nov 30	Week 5 Dec 7	Week 6 Dec 14	Week 7 Dec 21	Week 8 Dec 28	Week 9 Jan 4	Week 10 Jan 11	Week 11 Jan 18	Week 12 Jan 25	Week 13 Feb 1	Week 14 Feb 8	Week 15 Feb 15	Week 16 Feb 22	Week 17 Feb 29	Week 18 Mar 7	Week 19 Mar 14	
		Dropped: Wisconsin (1–1)	Dropped: Utah (4–1); Baylor (2–1); Butler (3–1); Michigan (2–1)	Dropped: Indiana (4–2); California (4–2); Notre Dame (4–2); UConn (4–2); Wichita State (2–4); LSU (3–2)	Dropped: Syracuse (6–2); Texas A&M (7–2)	Dropped: Gonzaga (6–3); Vanderbilt (6–3); Oregon (7–2); Utah (7–2)	Dropped: UConn (7–3); UCLA (8–4)	Dropped: George Washington (10–2)	Dropped: Utah (11–4); Cincinnati (11–4); Baylor (10–3); UCLA (9–6)	Dropped: Dayton (12–3); UConn (11–4)	Dropped: Gonzaga (14–4); Pittsburgh (15–2)	Dropped: USC (15–5); Butler (13–6); South Carolina (17–2)	Dropped: Duke (15–6); Notre Dame (15–5)	Dropped: Indiana (19–5); South Carolina (20–3)	Dropped: Texas A&M (18–7); USC (18–7); Wichita State (18–7)	Dropped: Dayton (21–5); Providence (19–8)	Dropped: Notre Dame (19–9)	None	Dropped: Texas (20–12)	

== USA Today Coaches Poll ==
The Coaches Poll is the second oldest poll still in use after the AP Poll. It is compiled by a rotating group of 31 college Division I head coaches. The Poll operates by Borda count. Each voting member ranks teams from 1 to 25. Each team then receives points for their ranking in reverse order: Number 1 earns 25 points, number 2 earns 24 points, and so forth. The points are then combined and the team with the highest points is then ranked No. 1; second highest is ranked No. 2 and so forth. Only the top 25 teams with points are ranked, with teams receiving first place votes noted the quantity next to their name. The maximum points a single team can earn is 775.

	Preseason Oct 15	Week 2 Nov 16	Week 3 Nov 23	Week 4 Nov 30	Week 5 Dec 7	Week 6 Dec 14	Week 7 Dec 21	Week 8 Dec 28	Week 9 Jan 4	Week 10 Jan 11	Week 11 Jan 18	Week 12 Jan 25	Week 13 Feb 1	Week 14 Feb 8	Week 15 Feb 15	Week 16 Feb 22	Week 17 Feb 29	Week 18 Mar 7	Week 19 Mar 14	Final Apr 5	
1.	North Carolina (12) т	North Carolina (2–0) (16)	Kentucky (4–0) (28)	Kentucky (6–0) (29)	Michigan State (9–0) (26)	Michigan State (11–0) (28)	Michigan State (12–0) (29)	Michigan State (13–0) (27)	Oklahoma (12–0) (20)	Kansas (14–1) (32)	Oklahoma (15–1) (26)	North Carolina (18–2) (23)	North Carolina (19–2) (18)	Villanova (20–3) (11)	Villanova (22–3) (25)	Villanova (24–3) (25)	Kansas (25–4) (31)	Kansas (27–4) (29)	Kansas (30–4) (31)	Villanova (35–5) (30)	1.
2.	Kentucky (11) т	Kentucky (2–0) (8)	Maryland (3–0) (3)	Maryland (5–0) (3)	Iowa State (6–0) (2)	Iowa State (9–0) (3)	Oklahoma (8–0) (2)	Oklahoma (11–0) (3)	Kansas (12–1) (11)	Oklahoma (13–1)	North Carolina (16–2) (4)	Oklahoma (16–2) (9)	Oklahoma (18–2) (14)	Maryland (21–3) (11)	Kansas (21–4) (7)	Kansas (23–4) (7)	Villanova (25–4)	Villanova (27–4)	Michigan State (29–5) (1)	North Carolina (33–7)	2.
3.	Maryland (5)	Maryland (1–0) (3)	Duke (4–1)	Michigan State (6–0)	North Carolina (7–1)	Oklahoma (7–0) (1)	Kansas (9–1)	Kansas (10–1) (1)	Maryland (13–1)	Maryland (15–1)	Kansas (15–2) (1)	Kansas (16–3)	Maryland (19–3)	Oklahoma (19–3) (3)	Oklahoma (20–4)	Virginia (21–5)	Michigan State (24–5) (1)	Michigan State (26–5) (1)	North Carolina (28–6)	Kansas (33–5)	3.
4.	Duke (3)	Duke (2–0) (3)	Michigan State (3–0)	Iowa State (4–0)	Kentucky (7–1)	Kentucky (9–1)	Maryland (10–1)	Maryland (11–1)	Virginia (12–1)	Michigan State (16–1)	Villanova (16–2)	Iowa (16–3)	Villanova (18–3)	Xavier (21–2)	North Carolina (21–4)	Oklahoma (21–5)	Virginia (22–6)	Virginia (24–6)	Oregon (28–6)	Oklahoma (29–8)	4.
5.	Kansas (1)	Kansas (1–0) (2)	Iowa State (2–0)	Duke (6–1)	Duke (8–1)	Kansas (8–1)	Virginia (9–1)	Virginia (10–1)	Michigan State (14–1) (1)	North Carolina (15–2)	Maryland (16–2)	Texas A&M (17–2)	Xavier (19–2)	Iowa (19–4) (3)	Maryland (22–4)	Xavier (24–3)	Xavier (25–4)	Xavier (26–4)	Virginia (26–7)	Virginia (29–8)	5.
6.	Virginia	Virginia (1–0)	Oklahoma (2–0)	Kansas (4–1)	Villanova (7–0) (2)	Duke (8–1)	Xavier (11–0)	Xavier (12–0)	Arizona (13–1)	Duke (14–2)	Xavier (16–1)	Villanova (17–3)	Kansas (17–4)	Kansas (19–4) (2)	Iowa (20–5)	North Carolina (22–5)	Oklahoma (22–6)	Oklahoma (24–6)	Villanova (29–5)	Oregon (31–7)	6.
7.	Iowa State	Iowa State (1–0)	Kansas (1–1)	Villanova (6–0)	Kansas (6–1)	Maryland (9–1)	North Carolina (9–2)	Arizona (12–1)	North Carolina (13–2)	Villanova (14–2)	West Virginia (15–2)	Maryland (17–3)	Iowa (17–4)	Virginia (19–4)	Xavier (22–3)	Michigan State (22–5)	Miami (FL) (23–5)	North Carolina (25–6)	Oklahoma (25–7)	Michigan State (29–6)	7.
8.	Oklahoma	Villanova (1–0) т	North Carolina (3–1)	Oklahoma (3–0)	Oklahoma (5–0)	Purdue (11–0)	Arizona (11–1)	North Carolina (10–2)	Kentucky (11–2)	Xavier (14–1)	Texas A&M (15-2)	Xavier (17–2)	Texas A&M (18–3)	North Carolina (19–4) (1)	Virginia (20–5)	Iowa (20–6)	North Carolina (23–6)	West Virginia (24–7)	West Virginia (26–8)	Miami (FL) (27–8)	8.
9.	Villanova	Oklahoma (0–0) т	Villanova (4–0)	North Carolina (5–1)	Maryland (7–1) (1)	Virginia (8–1)	Iowa State (9–1)	Iowa State (10–1)	Providence (14–1)	Miami (FL) (13–1)	Iowa (14–3)	West Virginia (16–3)	Virginia (17–4)	Michigan State (20–4) (1)	Michigan State (20–5)	Maryland (23–5)	West Virginia (22–7)	Oregon (25–6)	Xavier (27–5)	Indiana (27–8)	9.
10.	Arizona	Arizona (1–0)	Arizona (4–0)	Virginia (5–1)	Virginia (7–1)	Xavier (10–0)	Duke (9–2)	Butler (10–1)	Duke (12–2)	West Virginia (14–1)	Michigan State (16–3)	Providence (17–3)	Michigan State (19–4)	West Virginia (19–4)	Miami (FL) (20–4)	Arizona (22–5)	Oregon (23–6)	Indiana (25–6)	Purdue (26–8)	Syracuse (23–14)	10.
11.	Gonzaga	Wichita State (1–0)	Gonzaga (2–0)	Purdue (5–0)	Purdue (8–0)	North Carolina (7–2)	Kentucky (9–2)	Kentucky (10–2)	Miami (FL) (12–1)	Virginia (12–3)	Arizona (15–3)	Michigan State (17–4)	Providence (18–4)	Miami (FL) (18–4)	West Virginia (20–5)	Miami (FL) (21–5)	Indiana (23–6)	Miami (FL) (24–6)	Miami (FL) (25–7)	Xavier (28–6)	11.
12.	Wichita State	Gonzaga (0–0)	Virginia (4–1)	Gonzaga (4–1)	Arizona (7–1)	Arizona (9–1)	Butler (9–1)	Duke (9–2)	Xavier (13–1)	Providence (14–2)	Duke (14–4)	Virginia (15–4)	West Virginia (17–4)	Oregon (20–4)	Arizona (21–5)	West Virginia (20–7)	Maryland (23–6)	Utah (24–7)	Indiana (25–7)	Texas A&M (28–9)	12.
13.	Michigan State	Michigan State (1–0)	California (3–0)	Vanderbilt (5–1)	Xavier (8–0)	Villanova (8–1)	Purdue (11–1)	Providence (12–1)	Villanova (12–2)	Kentucky (12–3)	Virginia (13-4	Miami (FL) (15–3)	Baylor (17–4)	Texas A&M (18–5)	Dayton (21–3)	Oregon (21–6)	Purdue (22–7) т	Purdue (24–7)	Kentucky (26–8)	Maryland (27–9)	13.
14.	California	California (1–0)	Indiana (3–0)	Arizona (5–1)	West Virginia (7–0)	Baylor (7–1) т	Providence (11–1)	Purdue (12–1)	Iowa State (11–2)	Texas A&M (13–2)	Miami (FL) (13–3)	Louisville (16–3)	Iowa State (16–5)	Arizona (19–5)	Kentucky (19–6)	Kentucky (20–7)	Utah (23–7) т	Arizona (24–7)	Utah (26–8)	West Virginia (26–9)	14.
15.	Indiana	Indiana (1–0)	Purdue (5–0)	West Virginia (6–0)	Baylor (6–1)	Providence (10–1) т	Louisville (9–1)	Miami (FL) (10–1)	West Virginia (12–1)	South Carolina (15–0)	Baylor (14–3)	Arizona (16–4)	Miami (FL) (16–4)	Iowa State (17–6)	Iowa State (18–7)	Indiana (22–6)	Iowa (20–8)	Maryland (24–7)	Texas A&M (26–8)	Iowa State (23–12)	15.
16.	Utah	Utah (1–0)	Vanderbilt (3–0)	Oregon (5–0)	Vanderbilt (6–2)	Louisville (7–1)	Miami (FL) (9–1)	Villanova (9–2)	Louisville (12–2)	Arizona (13–3)	Louisville (14–3)	Iowa State (15–4)	Purdue (19–4)	Purdue (19–5)	Purdue (20–6)	Baylor (20–7)	Arizona (22–7)	Kentucky (23–8)	Arizona (25–8)	Kentucky (27–9)	16.
17.	Wisconsin	Vanderbilt (1–0)	LSU (3–0)	Cincinnati (7–0)	Gonzaga (5–2)	West Virginia (8–1)	Villanova (8–2)	West Virginia (10–1)	Texas A&M (11–2)	Pittsburgh (14–1)	Providence (15–3)	Indiana (17–3)	Oregon (18–4)	Dayton (19–3) т	Oregon (20–6)	Iowa State (19–8)	Baylor (21–8)	Texas A&M (24–7)	Maryland (25–8)	Notre Dame (24–12)	17.
18.	Notre Dame	Notre Dame (1–0)	Notre Dame (3–0)	Xavier (7–0)	Providence (8–1)	Butler (8–1)	West Virginia (9–1)	Louisville (11–2)	Purdue (13–2)	Iowa State (12–3)	South Carolina (16–1)	Baylor (15–4)	Louisville (17–4)	Providence (18–6) т	Notre Dame (18–7)	Duke (20–7)	Texas A&M (22–7)	Iowa (21–9)	Baylor (22–11)	Duke (25–11)	18.
19.	LSU	LSU (1–0)	Miami (FL) (5–0)	Syracuse (6–0)	Louisville (6–1)	Miami (FL) (8–1)	Texas A&M (9–2)	Texas A&M (9–2)	Butler (11–3)	Iowa (12–3)	Kentucky (13–4)	Kentucky (15-4	Kentucky (16–5)	Baylor (17–6)	Duke (19–6)	Purdue (21–7)	Kentucky (21–8)	Iowa State (21–10)	Iowa State (21–11)	Purdue (26–9)	19.
20.	Vanderbilt	Butler (1–0)	Wichita State (2–1)	Texas A&M (6–1)	Miami (FL) (7–1)	Cincinnati (8–2)	George Washington (10–1)	South Carolina (11–0)	South Carolina (13–0)	Louisville (13–3)	Pittsburgh (15–2)	Duke (15–5)	Arizona (17–5)	South Carolina (20–3)	Providence (19–7)	Notre Dame (18–8)	Iowa State (20–9)	Baylor (21–10)	Duke (23–10)	Utah (27–9)	20.
21.	Baylor	Baylor (1–0)	UConn (3–0)	Miami (FL) (5–1)	Butler (6–1)	Gonzaga (6–3)	Cincinnati (10–2)	Baylor (9–2)	Pittsburgh (12–1)	Gonzaga (13–3)	Iowa State (13–4)	Purdue (17–4)	Indiana (18–4)	Kentucky (17–6)	Indiana (20–6)	Texas A&M (20–7)	Duke (21–8)	Duke (22–9)	Seton Hall (25–8)	Gonzaga (28–8)	21.
22.	Butler	West Virginia (1–0)	West Virginia (3–0)	Louisville (5–0)	Cincinnati (8–1)	George Washington (9–1)	Baylor (8–2)	Utah (10–2)	Gonzaga (12–3)	Baylor (12–3)	Purdue (15–3)	South Carolina (17–2)	Wichita St (16–5)	Indiana (19–5)	Baylor (18–7)	Dayton (21–5)	Texas (19–10)	Texas (20–11)	Texas (20–12)	Arizona (25–9)	22.
23.	West Virginia	Purdue (2–0)	Oregon (4–0)	Baylor (4–1)	Oregon (6–1)	Vanderbilt (6–3)	South Carolina (10–0)	Cincinnati (10–3)	Iowa (11–3)	Butler (12–4)	Indiana (15–3)	Pittsburgh (16–3)	South Carolina (19–2)	USC (18–5)	South Carolina (21–4)	Utah (21–7)	Wichita State (23–7)	St. Mary's (26–4)	California (23–10)	Wisconsin (22–13)	23.
24.	UConn т	UConn (1–0)	Cincinnati (4–0)	Providence (6–1)	Utah (7–1)	Texas A&M (8–2)	Gonzaga (8–3)	Gonzaga (10–3)	UConn (10–3)	Purdue (14–3)	Butler (13–4)	Oregon (16–4)	Dayton (18–3)	Wichita State (17–6)	Texas A&M (18–7)	Providence (19–8)	Saint Mary's (24–4)	California (22–9)	Iowa (21–10)	Baylor (22–12)	24.
25.	Purdue т	Michigan (1–0)	Baylor (2–1)	Butler (4–1)	Texas A&M (7–2)	South Carolina (8–0)	Vanderbilt (7–3)	Pittsburgh (10–1)	Baylor (10–3)	Indiana (14–3)	USC (15–2)	Wichita State (14–5)	Saint Mary's (18–2)	Texas (16–7)	Texas (16–9)	Texas (17–10)	California (21–8)	Wisconsin (20–11)	Saint Joseph's (27–7)	Iowa (22–11)	25.
	Preseason Oct 15	Week 2 Nov 16	Week 3 Nov 23	Week 4 Nov 30	Week 5 Dec 7	Week 6 Dec 14	Week 7 Dec 21	Week 8 Dec 28	Week 9 Jan 4	Week 10 Jan 11	Week 11 Jan 18	Week 12 Jan 25	Week 13 Feb 1	Week 14 Feb 8	Week 15 Feb 15	Week 16 Feb 22	Week 17 Feb 29	Week 18 Mar 7	Week 19 Mar 14	Final Apr 5	
		Dropped: Wisconsin (1–1)	Dropped: Utah (4–1); Butler (3–1); Michigan (2–1)	Dropped: California (4–2); Indiana (4–2); LSU (3–2); Notre Dame (4–2); Wichita State (2–4); UConn (4–2)	Dropped: Syracuse (6–2)	Dropped: Oregon (7–2); Utah (7–2)	None	Dropped: George Washington (10–2); Vanderbilt (7–4)	Dropped: Utah (11–4); Cincinnati (11–4)	Dropped: UConn (11–4)	Dropped: Gonzaga (14–4)	Dropped: USC (15–5); Butler (13–5)	Dropped: Duke (15–6); Pittsburgh (17–4)	Dropped: Louisville (18–5); Saint Mary's (19–3)	Dropped: Wichita State (18–6); USC (18–7)	Dropped: South Carolina (22–5)	Dropped: Notre Dame (19–9); Dayton (22–6); Providence (20–9)	Dropped: Wichita State (24–8)	Dropped: Saint Mary's (27–5); Wisconsin (20–12)	Dropped: Seton Hall (25–9); Texas (20–13); California (23–11); Saint Joseph's (28–8)	

== See also ==
2015–16 NCAA Division I women's basketball rankings
