= Collège Canado-Haïtien =

Location
- 148, Ave Jean Paul II; Port-au-Prince; Haiti
- Coordinates: 18.532222°N 72.325000°W

Information
- Denomination: Roman Catholic
- Established: 1969
- Founder: Brothers of the Sacred Heart
- CEEB code: 858525HA
- Grades: 6-12
- Gender: both
- Classrooms: 31
- Slogan: Plus haut, plus fort, plus loin (higher, stronger, farther)
- Sports: Basketball, football, volleyball
- Website: collegecanadohaitien.org

Collège Canado-Haïtien (CCH) is a junior-senior high school in Port-au-Prince, Haiti.

== History ==
The Canado-Haitian College was established in Turgeau in 1969. It integrated high school students attending other schools of the Brothers of the Sacred Heart such as Pope John XXIII School in the Bicentenaire area of Port-au-Prince, Saint-Jean-L'Évangéliste in Turgeau, and Liberia School in Impasse Lavaud, Bois Verna. It also served several students from Petit Séminaire Collège Saint-Martial, Institution Saint-Louis de Gonzague and other schools. The school was managed by the Brothers of the Sacred Heart.

== Campus ==
The Canado-Haitian College campus was composed of four floors, A total of 31 classroom, a library, a cafeteria, the secretariat and the "Direction" (Place where are the bureau of the principals.asst. principal and the counselors), and also a big auditorium. It also had a recreation court that is composed of 2 basketball and two volleyball court. After the earthquake, the campus is made of houses that contains three classroom but the secretariat, the cafeteria, and the direction is still intact. Next to the campus, there was a university called Canado-technical center, the building was damaged but is repaired now.

== Curriculum ==
Canado offers three major vehicles designed specifically to carry the student toward a bachelorship in Literature or Sciences and a bachelorship in Mathematics. They are as follows:

- An Academic option comprising Literature, Sciences and Mathematics.
- A Technical option comprising Electricity, Automobile Repair, Electronics, Refrigeration, or Machine Shop
- A Commercial option comprising Accounting, Office Management, and related courses

== Extracurricular activities ==
Religious, sports, cultural, and social activities are planned through the Student Life organization.

== Notable alumni ==
- Skal Labissière, professional basketball player of the National Basketball Association (NBA)
- Dany Laferriere, Haitian-Canadian novelist
- Jovenel Moïse, President of Haiti (2017–2021)
- Kerry Norbrun , medical doctor, digital marketing specialist
