= Skal Labissière =

Haitian basketball player (born 1996)

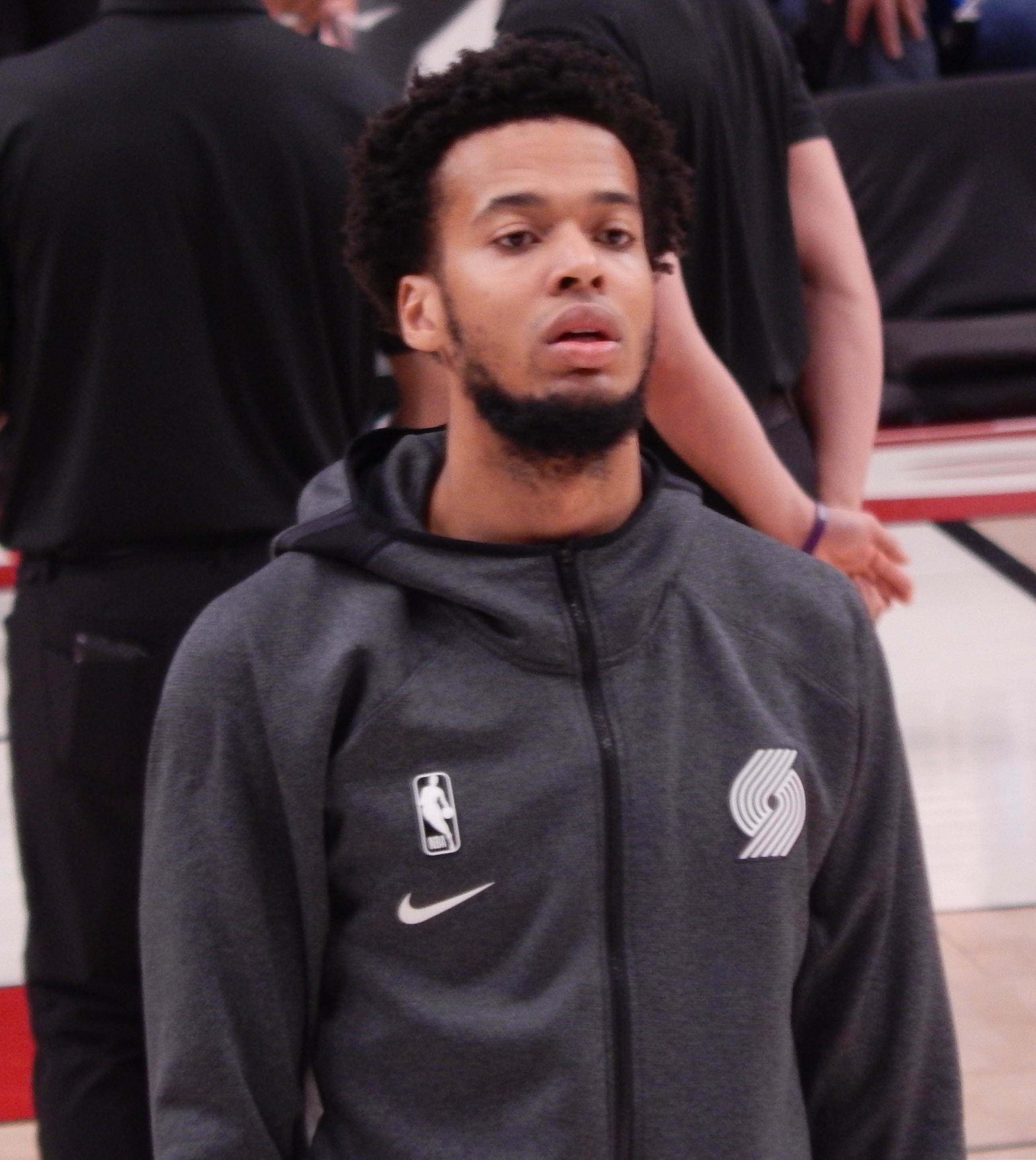
- Labissière with the Portland Trail Blazers in 2019

No. 17 – Capital City Go-Go
- Position: Power forward / center
- League: NBA G League

Personal information
- Born: March 18, 1996 (age 30) Port-au-Prince, Haiti
- Listed height: 6 ft 10 in (2.08 m)
- Listed weight: 235 lb (107 kg)

Career information
- High school: Evangelical Christian School (Memphis, Tennessee); Lausanne Collegiate School (Memphis, Tennessee)
- College: Kentucky (2015–2016)
- NBA draft: 2016: 1st round, 28th overall pick
- Drafted by: Phoenix Suns
- Playing career: 2016–present

Career history
- 2016–2019: Sacramento Kings
- 2016–2017: →Reno Bighorns
- 2019–2020: Portland Trail Blazers
- 2021: Westchester Knicks
- 2022: Cangrejeros de Santurce
- 2023: Mexico City Capitanes
- 2023–2025: Stockton Kings
- 2025: Sacramento Kings
- 2025–present: Capital City Go-Go
- 2026: Washington Wizards

Career highlights
- NBA G League champion (2025); 3x NBA G League Next Up Game (2024, 2025, 2026); First-team Parade All-American (2015)
- Stats at NBA.com
- Stats at Basketball Reference

Skal Labissière (French: [labisjɛʁ]; born March 18, 1996) is a Haitian professional basketball player for the Capital City Go-Go of the NBA G League. He graduated from Lausanne Collegiate School in Memphis, Tennessee, before playing one season of college basketball for the Kentucky Wildcats. He played for the Stockton Kings of the NBA G League before being signed to the Sacramento Kings for one year.

== Early years ==
Labissière was born in Port-au-Prince in Haiti. His basketball career began at the Collège Canado-Haïtien, a junior-senior high school in Port-au-Prince, which participated in school championships organized by the Comité Interscolaire de Basket-ball Amateur (CIBA) and the Association de Basket-ball Interscolaire (ASI). During the 2010 Haiti earthquake, his family's home collapsed with Labissière, his mother and his brother inside. All three survived but remained trapped under debris for three hours. His legs were pinned, causing them to go numb, and Labissière was unable to walk for a few weeks after. A few months following the earthquake, Labissière moved to Memphis, Tennessee, to live with Gerald Hamilton, who ran the Reach Your Dream Foundation that brings international athletes to the United States as young prospects.

== High school career ==
Labissière attended Evangelical Christian School in Memphis and started to play varsity basketball as an eighth-grader. When he had first arrived, Labissière spoke little English and required a French interpreter in all of his classes. After three to four months, he didn't need the help and became fluent. In 2014, he left the school his senior year and enrolled at Lausanne Collegiate School, also located in Memphis, but because of the move he was ruled by TSSAA as ineligible to play basketball at Lausanne for the season. Instead, Labissière played for Hamilton's Reach Your Dream Prep Academy team, where he averaged 26 points, 12 rebounds and 4.5 blocks per game.

"The harder I work, the better I will be as a basketball player and I'll be able to influence more people around the world."

— Skal Labissière

College recruiting
Name	Hometown	School	Height	Weight	Commit date
Skal Labissière; PF/C	Port-au-Prince, Haiti	Lausanne Collegiate School	6 ft 11 in (2.11 m)	210 lb (95 kg)	Nov 13, 2014
Skal Labissière; PF/C	Recruit ratings: Scout: Rivals: 247Sports: ESPN: (96)				
Overall recruit ranking: Scout: 1 Rivals: 1 ESPN: 2, 1 (C), 1 (TN)
Note: In many cases, Scout, Rivals, 247Sports, On3, and ESPN may conflict in their listings of height and weight.; In these cases, the average was taken. ESPN grades are on a 100-point scale.; Sources: "Kentucky 2015 Basketball Commitments". Rivals.; "2015 Kentucky Basketball Commits". Scout.; "ESPN". ESPN.; "Scout.com Team Recruiting Rankings". Scout.; "2015 Team Ranking". Rivals.

== College career ==
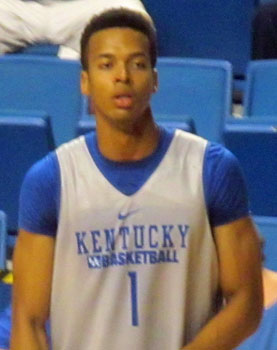
Labissière playing for Kentucky

Labissière was rated as a five-star recruit, and was considered among the best players in his class. He committed to the University of Kentucky (UK) to play college basketball. UK's coach, John Calipari, offered Labissière a scholarship before any other 2015 prospect, comparing him to Anthony Davis. At the start of the season, he was considered a potential number 1 draft pick for the 2016 NBA draft. Labissière posted averages of 6.6 points (.516 FG%, .661 FT%), 3.1 rebounds, 1.6 blocks and 15.8 minutes per game in all 36 games while starting 18 of them for the 2015–16 Kentucky Wildcats.

On April 5, 2016, Labissière declared for the NBA draft, forgoing his final three years of college eligibility.

== Professional career ==
=== Sacramento Kings (2016–2019) ===
On June 23, 2016, Labissière was selected by the Phoenix Suns with the 28th overall pick in the 2016 NBA draft, becoming the highest drafted Haitian player since Samuel Dalembert (26th overall in 2001). His rights were later traded to the Sacramento Kings on draft night, and on July 15, he signed his rookie scale contract with the Kings. Labissière made his NBA debut on November 5, recording eight points and three rebounds in 15 minutes off the bench in a 117–91 loss to the Milwaukee Bucks. On February 23, 2017, in just his ninth game of the season, Labissière had a season-high 12 points in a 116–100 win over the Denver Nuggets. On March 1, in his first career start, Labissière had 10 points and five rebounds in 15 minutes in a 109–100 loss to the Brooklyn Nets. On March 15, he scored 21 of his career-high 32 points in the fourth quarter of the Kings' 107–101 win over Phoenix Suns, becoming the first rookie from the 2016 draft class to score at least 30. He also had 11 rebounds to record his first career double-double. Labissière became the youngest Kings player to record a 30–10 game and the fourth Kings player to do it as a reserves since the 1984–85 season. His points total was the highest for a Kings first-year player since teammate Ben McLemore scored 31 in 2013–14. Labissière became only the 41st player in NBA history to score at least 32 points while age 20 or younger—the only other player to achieve this feat in franchise history is Tyreke Evans.

During his rookie season, he had multiple assignments with the Reno Bighorns of the NBA Development League. On December 5, 2017, Labissière was assigned to the Reno Bighorns. He was recalled by the Kings four days later. On January 2, 2018, Labissière recorded 17 points and a career-best 15 rebounds in a 131–111 loss to the Charlotte Hornets. On January 22, he scored a season-high 23 points in a 112–107 loss to the Charlotte Hornets.

=== Portland Trail Blazers (2019–2020) ===
On February 7, 2019, Labissière was traded to the Portland Trail Blazers in exchange for Caleb Swanigan. On April 10, Labissière started the season finale for Portland as the team was resting its rotation players for the playoffs. In 40 minutes of action, Labissière had 29 points and 15 rebounds, helping the Blazers overcome a 28-point deficit in a 136–131 win.

On February 6, 2020, Labissière and cash considerations were traded to the Atlanta Hawks for a future protected second-round draft pick. He did not play any games for the Hawks and at the end of the season, he did not re-sign with the team either, and became a free agent.

=== Westchester Knicks (2021) ===
On December 9, 2020, Labissière signed with the New York Knicks. He was waived two days later. He was then added to the Knicks’ NBA G League affiliate, the Westchester Knicks. He made his Westchester debut on February 10, 2021.

=== Cangrejeros de Santurce (2022) ===
Labissière joined the San Antonio Spurs for the 2021 NBA Summer League.

On March 10, 2022, Labissière signed with Cangrejeros de Santurce of the Baloncesto Superior Nacional.

=== Mexico City Capitanes (2023) ===
On March 3, 2023, Labissière was acquired by the Mexico City Capitanes.

On April 26, 2023, Labissière signed with Grises de Humacao of the Puerto Rican league, but didn't play for them.

=== Sacramento / Stockton Kings (2023–2025) ===
On September 8, 2023, Labissière signed with the Sacramento Kings and was waived the same day. On November 9, Labissière was named to the Opening Night roster for the Stockton Kings.

On September 26, 2024, Labissière re-signed with Sacramento, but was waived on October 18. On October 27, he joined the Stockton Kings. On March 3, 2025, Sacramento signed Labissière to a 10-day contract. In four appearances for the Kings, Labissière averaged 1.3 points, 0.8 rebounds, and 0.3 assists.

=== Washington Wizards / Capital City Go-Go (2025–present) ===
On October 6, 2025, Labissière signed an Exhibit 10 contract with the Washington Wizards, but was waived seven days later. He was then added to the Wizards' G League affiliate, the Capital City Go-Go.

On January 27, 2026, Labissière signed a 10-day contract with the Wizards.

== Career statistics ==
Legend
GP	Games played	GS	Games started	MPG	Minutes per game
FG%	Field goal percentage	3P%	3-point field goal percentage	FT%	Free throw percentage
RPG	Rebounds per game	APG	Assists per game	SPG	Steals per game
BPG	Blocks per game	PPG	Points per game	**Bold**	Career high

=== NBA ===
==== Regular season ====
Year	Team	GP	GS	MPG	FG%	3P%	FT%	RPG	APG	SPG	BPG	PPG
2016–17	Sacramento	33	12	18.5	.537	.375	.703	4.9	.8	.5	.4	**8.8**
2017–18	Sacramento	**60**	**29**	**20.7**	.448	.353	**.805**	4.8	1.2	.4	.8	8.7
2018–19	Sacramento	13	0	8.7	.433	.364	.545	1.8	.5	.2	.2	2.8
2018–19	Portland	9	1	7.0	**.684**	**1.000**	.500	2.1	.6	.3	.3	3.4
2019–20	Portland	33	1	17.2	.551	.231	.758	**5.1**	**1.3**	.2	**.9**	5.8
2024–25	Sacramento	4	0	3.0	.500	**1.000**	—	.8	.3	.0	.0	1.3
2025–26	Washington	3	0	12.7	.600	.200	—	3.0	1.0	**.7**	.3	4.3
Career		155	43	17.1	.493	.352	.748	4.3	1.0	.4	.6	7.0

==== Playoffs ====
Year	Team	GP	GS	MPG	FG%	3P%	FT%	RPG	APG	SPG	BPG	PPG
2019	Portland	3	0	3.7	.250	.000	.000	.0	.0	.0	.0	.7
Career		3	0	3.7	.250	.000	.000	.0	.0	.0	.0	.7

=== College ===
Year	Team	GP	GS	MPG	FG%	3P%	FT%	RPG	APG	SPG	BPG	PPG
2015–16	Kentucky	36	18	15.8	.516	.000	.661	3.1	.3	.3	1.6	6.6
