= Lausanne Collegiate School =

Private school in Memphis, Tennessee, US

Location
- 1381 West Massey Road; Memphis, Tennessee 38120; United States

Information
- Former names: Lausanne School for Girls
- Established: 1926
- President: Mike Derrick
- Headmaster: Stuart McCathie
- Grades: Pre-K2 – 12
- Enrollment: 890 (2026)
- Campus size: 30 acres (12 ha)
- Annual tuition: $15,132-31,257
- Website: www.lausanneschool.com

Lausanne Collegiate School (/lɑːzæn/; previously Lausanne School for Girls) is an independent, coeducational college-placement school in Memphis, Tennessee. With grades for pre-kindergarten through twelfth grade, foreign nationals comprise 1/3 of the student body, representing 68 different countries.

With a 99-year history beginning in 1926, the previously single-sex boarding school has become a co-educational day school. An International Baccalaureate (IB) school since 2009, Lausanne adopted the program for all grades in 2018. In 2017 it partnered with Fujian's Xiamen #1 School to open another IB school in Xiamen, China.

The current campus was a filming location for 1993's The Firm.

== History ==
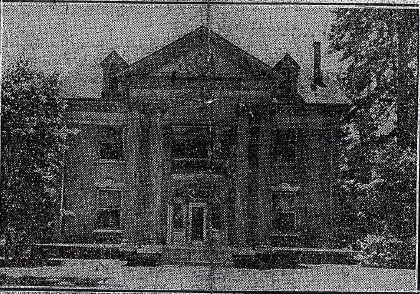
Original schoolhouse (Nov. 1926)

Originally a single-sex school, the Lausanne School for Girls first opened its doors in 1926. At its outset, the school was jointly managed by Emma DeSaussure Jett, Sophia Alexander Gardner, Bessie Statler, and Florence Goyer Taylor. The school was first located at 1649 Central Avenue, in a home previously called the "Cary House"; The Commercial Appeal called the building especially suited to schooling with the possibility of expanding it in the future. Lausanne began accepting both sexes of students for the 1966–67 academic year.

=== Boarding ===
Lausanne credited a Mrs. L. K. Thompson for the school's history of boarding students. Thompson, a "benefactress whose name was almost synonymous with the school", had friends in Little Rock, Arkansas, who wanted their children enrolled at Lausanne. After putting up the girls in her attic, similar demand led the school to construct a dormitory.

Lausanne's co-educational transition was also the heyday of its boarding program, whose numbers hovered around 100. The 1970s saw a decline in demand for boarding schools, and when Lausanne's number dropped, some dormitories were transformed into classrooms. By the 1990–91 academic year, Lausanne had 285 students and only 18 boarders—four of whom were from East Asia; in early 1992, it was the only girls' boarding program in Shelby County, Tennessee. Six months later, with only eight boarders, Lausanne ended its history of boarding; four seniors were diverted to private homes for their last year of school. Though it was estimated that 18 boarders would be financially sufficient to re-board students, Headmaster Elder was doubtful of the program's odds for resurrection.

=== Leadership ===
Lausanne heads

- Logan Malone (–1991)
- Toni Watson (1991–92)†
- George P. Elder (1992–)
- Stuart McCathie (2005–present)

— † = interim

In July 1991, Lausanne headmaster Logan Malone resigned his position to join the Mid-South Foundation for Medical Care. For the 1991–92 academic year, board member Toni Watson served in Malone's stead while a full-time headmaster was headhunted. On July 1, 1992, New Orleans native George B. Elder (born 1946/1947) took the job. The Lausanne board of directors expressed excitement about Elder's experience (headmastering four previous schools), "his fund-raising ability, which is always a consideration for a private school; his attitude; his interest in athletics and the theater." Elder's first year at Lausanne saw 64% increased enrollment.

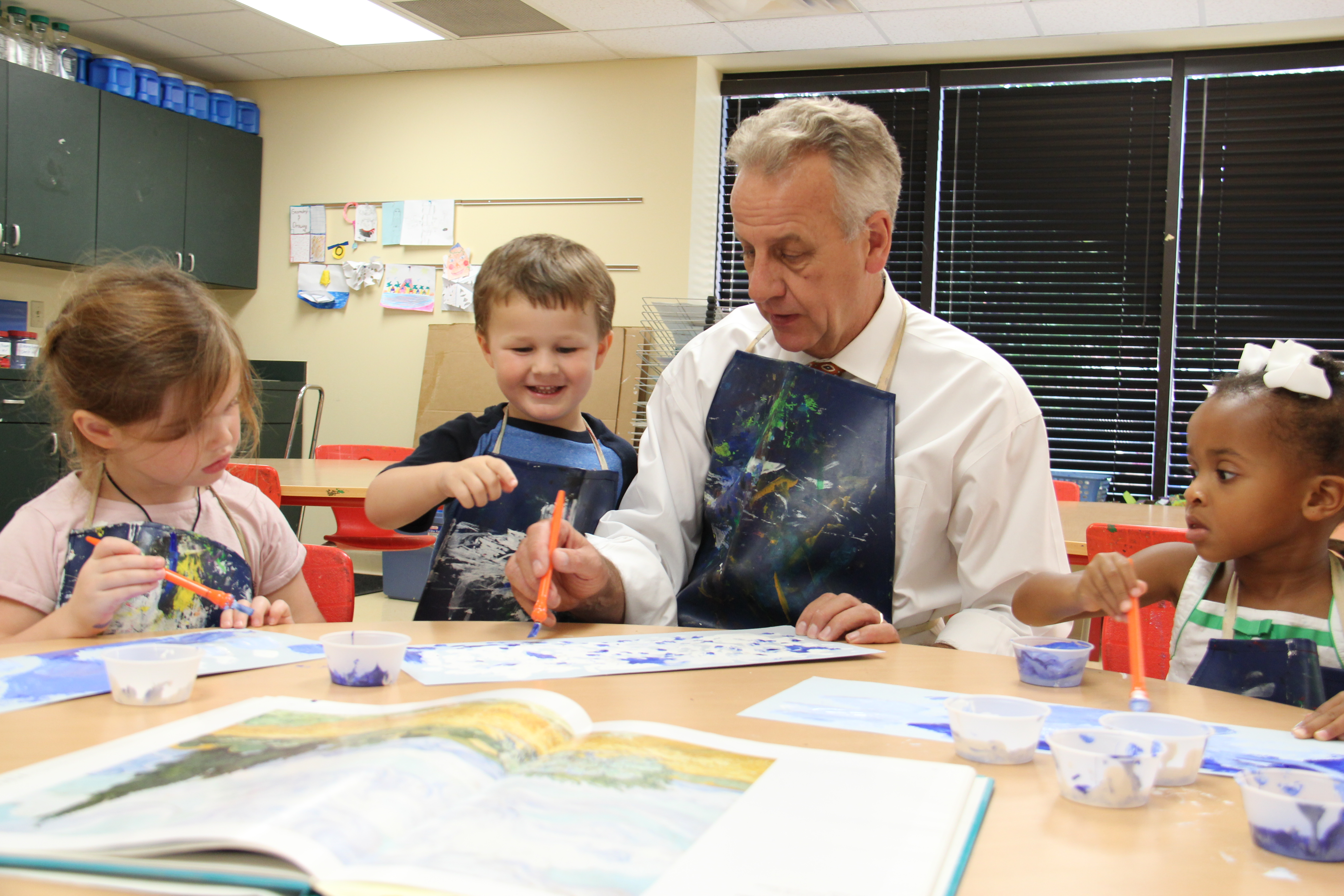
Stuart McCathie painting with pre-kindergarten students (Sep. 2016)

Stuart McCathie is the tenth headmaster of Lausanne, having taken the position in July 2005. An English native, McCathie has a bachelor's degree in education from Lancaster University and a master's degree in school administration from the University of North Carolina at Wilmington. As of April 2016, McCathie was the fifth-highest-paid private school administrator in Memphis, Tennessee with a salary of $326,606 (equivalent to $438,147 in 2025), according to the Memphis Business Journal.

== Academics ==
Lausanne has been an International Baccalaureate school since December 7, 2009.

Beginning in 2018, all Lausanne students from pre-kindergarten up began participating in the International Baccalaureate Diploma Programme (IBDP), a curriculum where "the teacher's role is about helping the students come up with the right question".

=== Meditation ===
Starting the 2012–13 academic year, middle school students aged 10–14 were offered the opportunity to meditate during their 10–15 minute recess break. The program—called "mental recess"—was begun to help students relieve stress, perform better on standardized tests, and disconnect from their mobile computing devices.

== Admissions ==
Prospective students must take an exam and score within a certain percentage, and make it through an interview process. Annual tuition and fees for the 2026-27 academic year range from $15,132 to $32,857, depending on the age of the student.

== Student body ==
In 2026, Lausanne self-reported 900 students enrolled (280 in the lower school, 250 in the middle school, and 370 in the upper school) with pupils from 74 different nations.

In summer 2006, Lausanne developed its own house system for middle-schoolers; the sub-units were named Cottingham, Lendenwood, Massey, and Monmouth.

In 2020, arising from the Black Lives Matter movement, concerns about inequity, and the 2020–21 United States racial unrest, Lausanne formed a task force with the purpose of creating an inclusive environment at the school. Lausanne, whose "student population was nearly 50% people of color — and among the highest percentages for a Memphis independent school", was spurred by alumni who felt the school wasn't doing enough to hire non-whites (who by February 2021 only amounted to 11% of the staff), and needed to only contract with similarly inclusive vendors.

== Extracurriculars ==
=== Academic ===
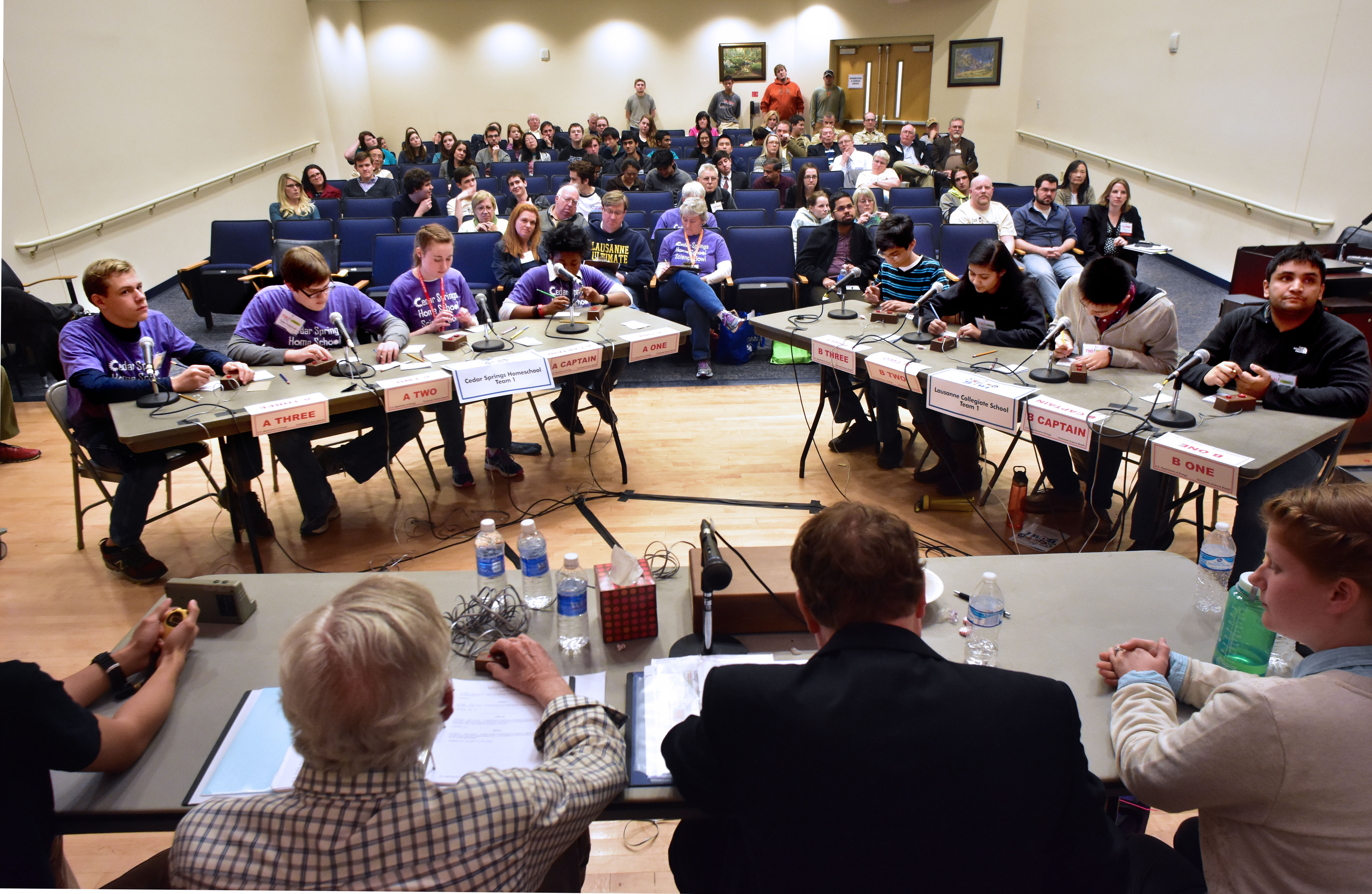
Cedar Springs Homeschool vs. Lausanne at the 2016 Science Bowl

Lausanne's National Science Bowl team won state in 2015, and came in second to Knoxville, Tennessee's Cedar Springs Homeschool in 2016.

=== Athletic ===
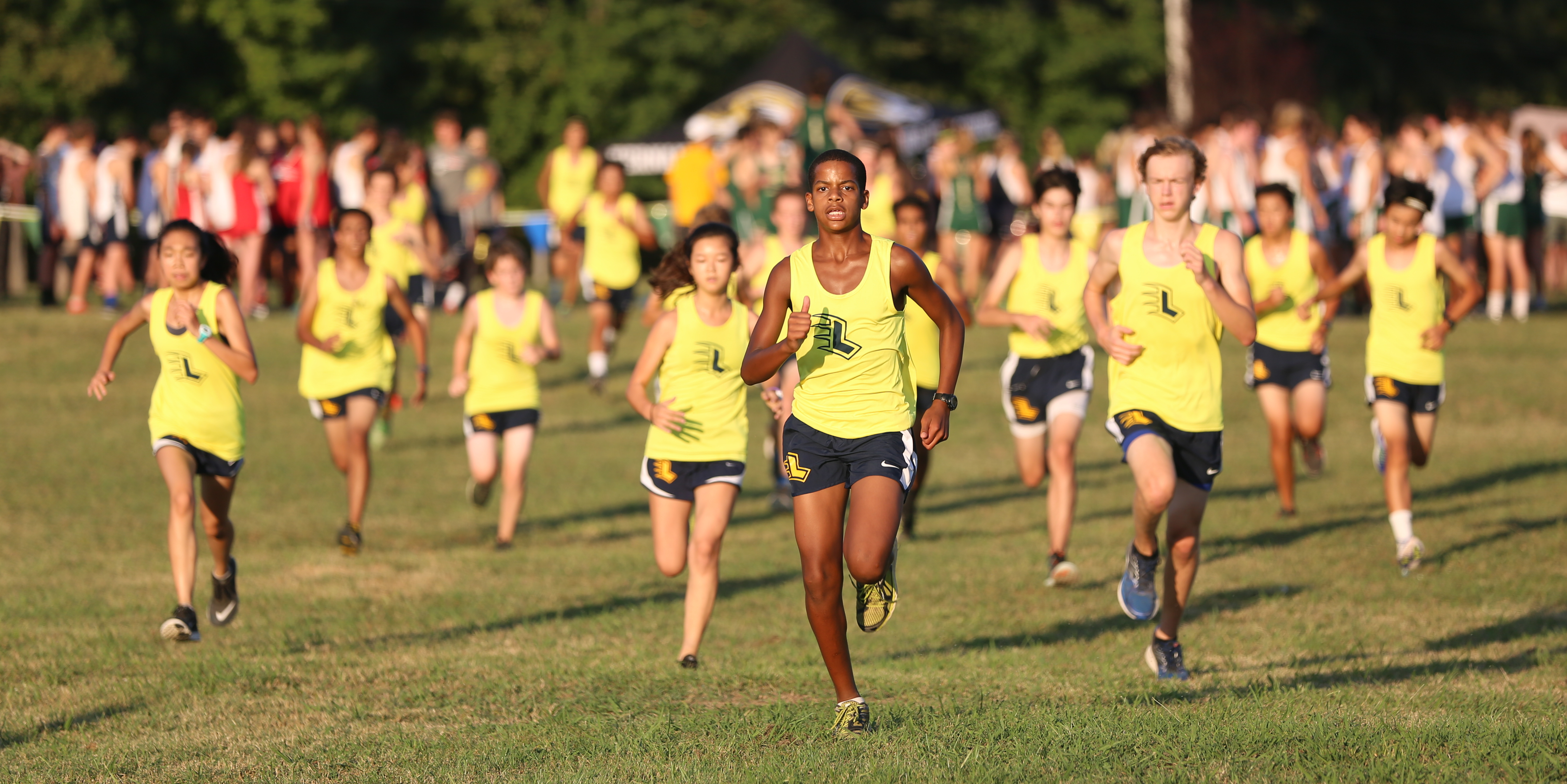
The 2016 cross country team

As of 1992, Lausanne fielded boys' athletic teams in basketball, golf, track and field, and tennis. The school also had several girls' teams.

==== American football ====
Lausanne started its American football program with the 1992–93 academic year. By July 29, 16 boys had applied for the new team. The team won their seasons in 2013 and 2014, and made their inaugural visit to the playoffs in 2015, losing to state champ St. George's Independent School. In 2016, Lausanne had three players being scouted by the United States Military Academy and Naval Academy.

== Campus ==
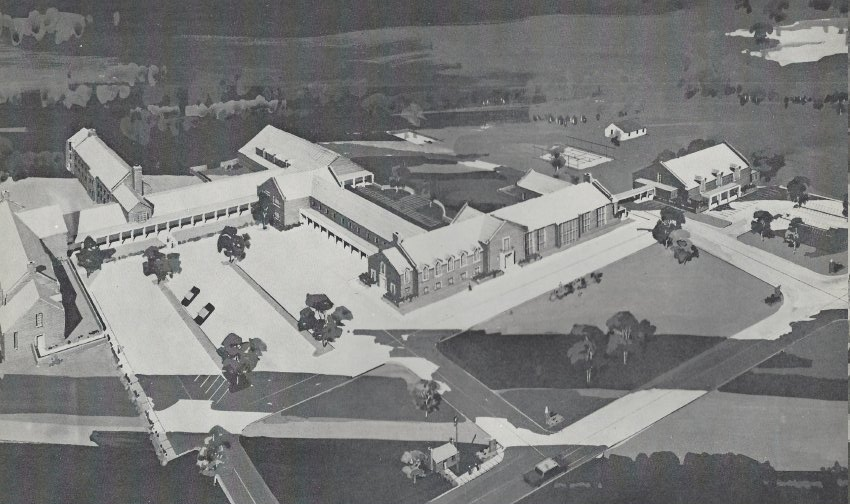
Lausanne campus (1959)

Lausanne's Memphis campus has 30 acres (12 ha) of land, and its first buildings were built in the 1960s. In 2008, Lausanne was a recipient of an American Academy of Dermatology grant for the construction of "shade structures" to protect students from damaging ultraviolet radiation.

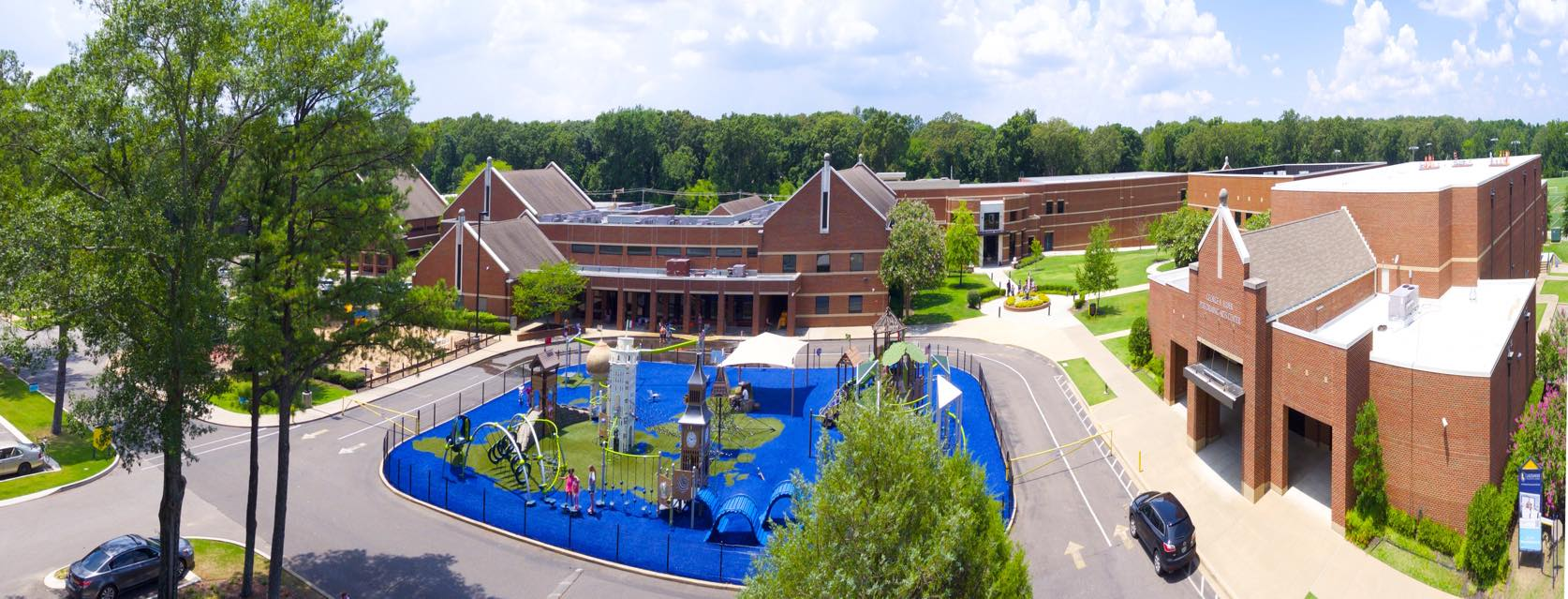
Discovery Center (front), lower school (center-rear), and EPAC (right)

When planning to replace an existing playground for its lower school students (pre-kindergarten through fourth grade) in the campus' front, Lausanne desired not only a globally themed installation, but also an enhancement to the school's curb appeal. Lausanne contracted with Landscape Structures and the final design was partly the contribution of the Lausanne graduating-class of 2024. Groundbreaking happened in early summer 2015, and was finished by that August. Featuring replicas of Big Ben, the Eiffel Tower, and the Taj Mahal, the International Outdoor Discovery Center (IODC) has 14 different structures representing international locales laid out on a surface designed after a Rand McNally world map. The playground replaced by the IODC was reinstalled at Promise Academy.

=== Xiamen, Fujian ===
Fujian's Xiamen #1 School approached Lausanne in September 2014 about partnering to open another IBDP school in Xiamen, China. The partnership was facilitated by Lausanne's relationship with the Confucius Institute. Facing a maximized enrollment, and looking for additional revenue streams, Lausanne agreed to the partnership. Announced by Lausanne chairwoman Noma Anderson in 2016, the new "Xiamen #1 Lausanne International School" had a construction budget of US$50 million (equivalent to about $67.1M in 2025), was scheduled to open in August 2017, and was expected to eventually support 1200 students. Once open, the new international school would offer teacher and student exchange programs between the Memphis and Fujian institutions, as well as five- and seven-day boarding.

== Legacy ==
In 2022, Niche ranked Lausanne the third-best private high school in Tennessee. In October 2023, it moved to first place. Nationally, it ranked 248th.

=== Commencement speakers ===
- 1992: D'Army Bailey – American judge and actor

=== Notable alumni ===
- Moussa Cissé – Guinean basketball player (born 2002)
- Mignon Dunn – American mezzo-soprano and voice teacher (1928–2026)
- Marc Gasol – Spanish basketball player (born 1985)
- Brock Glenn – American football player
- Ginnifer Goodwin – American actress (born 1978)
- Eric Gray – American football player (born 1999)
- Skal Labissière – Haitian basketball player (born 1996)
- Jodie Markell – American actress and film director (born 1959)
- Cameron Payne – American basketball player (born 1994)
- Andrew VanWyngarden – American musician (born 1983)

=== Miscellaneous ===
Several scenes of 1993's The Firm were filmed at Lausanne, which stood in for the private school at which character Abby McDeere teaches. Production crews fenced-off the school's playground prior to Christmas 1992, and semi-trailer trucks began arriving at West Massey Road on January 5. Actors Jeanne Tripplehorn and Gene Hackman were on-campus for shooting. Headmaster Elder asked for filming to take place during the academic year to allow for a school assembly with cast and crew; the film's producer agreed to meet with students and bring a cast member with him.
