= 2015–16 Mississippi State Bulldogs men's basketball team =

American college basketball season

2015–16 Mississippi State Bulldogs men's basketball
- Conference: Southeastern Conference
- Record: 14–17 (7–11 SEC)
- Head coach: Ben Howland (1st season)
- Assistant coaches: George Brooks; Wes Flanigan; Ernie Zeigler
- Home arena: Humphrey Coliseum

2015–16 Southeastern Conference men's basketball standings
	Conf.				Overall
Team	W		L	PCT	W		L	PCT
No. 15 Texas A&M	13	–	5	.722	28	–	9	.757
No. 10 Kentucky †	13	–	5	.722	27	–	9	.750
South Carolina	11	–	7	.611	25	–	9	.735
Vanderbilt	11	–	7	.611	19	–	14	.576
LSU	11	–	7	.611	19	–	14	.576
Ole Miss	10	–	8	.556	20	–	12	.625
Georgia	10	–	8	.556	20	–	14	.588
Florida	9	–	9	.500	21	–	15	.583
Arkansas	9	–	9	.500	16	–	16	.500
Alabama	8	–	10	.444	18	–	15	.545
Mississippi State	7	–	11	.389	14	–	17	.452
Tennessee	6	–	12	.333	15	–	19	.441
Auburn	5	–	13	.278	11	–	20	.355
Missouri^{*}	3	–	15	.167	10	–	21	.323
† 2016 SEC tournament winner^{*}Ineligible for postseason play due to self-imposed postseason ban. Rankings from AP poll

The 2015–16 Mississippi State Bulldogs basketball team represented Mississippi State University in the 2015–16 NCAA Division I men's basketball season. The Bulldogs, led by first year head coach Ben Howland, played their home games at the Humphrey Coliseum in Starkville, Mississippi as a member of the Southeastern Conference. They finished the season 14–17, 7–11 in SEC play to finish in 11th place. They lost to Georgia in the second round of the SEC tournament.

== Previous season ==
The Bulldogs finished the 2014–15 season 13–19, 6–12 in SEC play to finish in a tie for 11th place. They lost in the first round of the SEC tournament to Auburn. On March 21, head coach Rick Ray was fired. Shortly thereafter, Ben Howland was hired as head coach.

== Before the season ==
=== Departures ===
The Bulldogs lost 4 scholarship players, two to graduation and two transfers. The team also had 2 senior walk-ons graduate.

Name	Number	Pos.	Height	Weight	Year	Hometown	Notes
Maurice Dunlap	0	Guard	6'2"	175	Freshman	Greenwood, MS	Transferred to Jones County JC
Trivante Bloodman	3	Guard	6'0"	190	Senior	Bronx, NY	Graduated
Isaiah Butler	5	Guard	6'2"	214	Senior	Brandon, MS	Graduated (Walk-on)
Jeffery Johnson	10	Guard	6'2"	173	Senior	Memphis, TN	Graduated (Walk-on)
Roquez Johnson	25	Forward	6'7"	214	Senior	Montgomery, AL	Graduated
Oliver Black	33	Guard	6'9"	215	Freshman	Jackson, MS	Transferred to Arkansas–Little Rock

=== Recruits ===
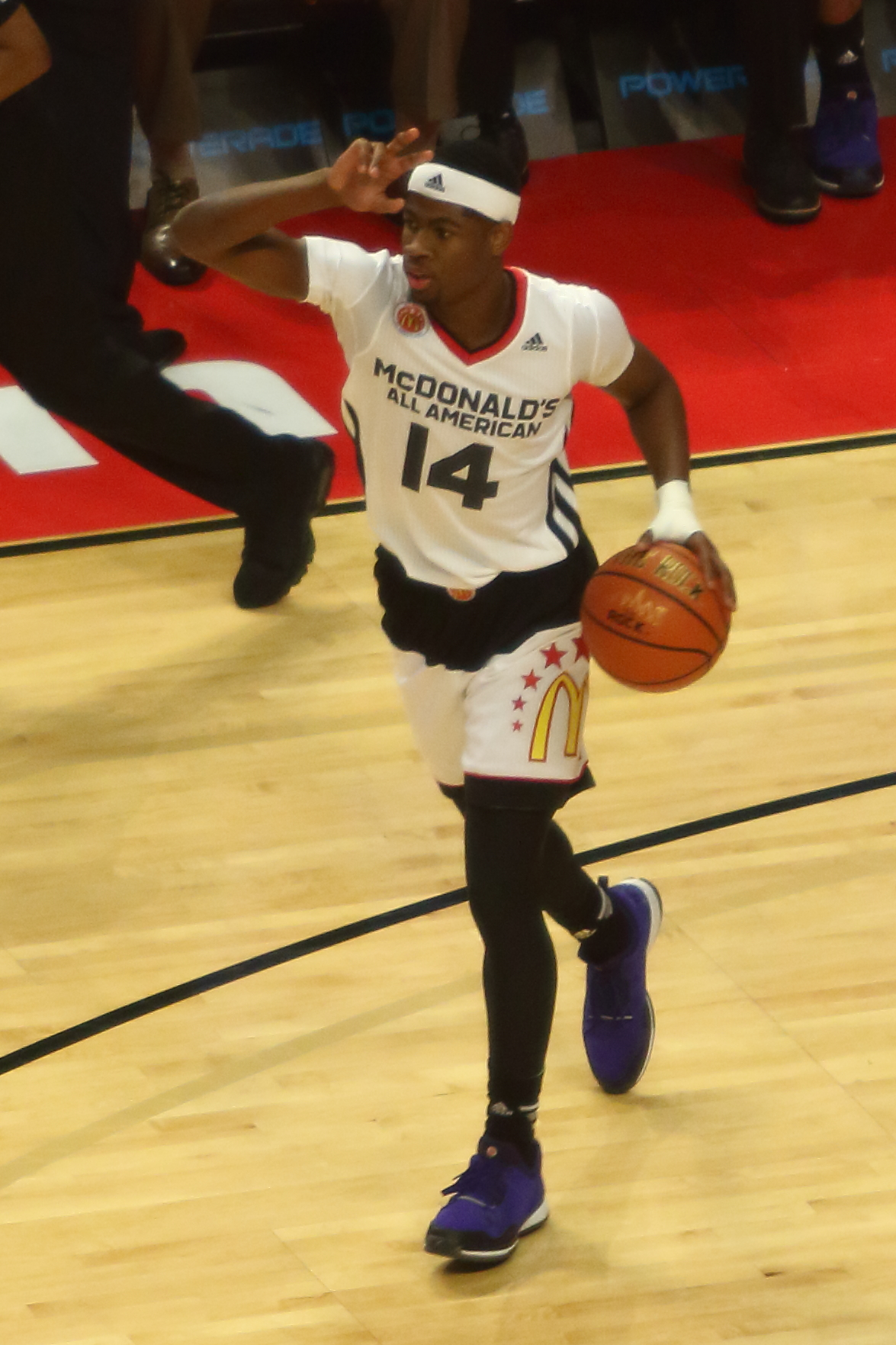
Malik Newman at the 2015 McDonald's All-American Boys Game

College recruiting
Name	Hometown	School	Height	Weight	Commit date
Aric Holman; PF	Owensboro, KY	Owensboro (KY)	6 ft 9 in (2.06 m)	200 lb (91 kg)	May 21, 2015
Aric Holman; PF	Recruit ratings: Scout: Rivals: 247Sports: ESPN:				
Malik Newman; PG	Jackson, MS	Callaway (MS)	6 ft 3 in (1.91 m)	174 lb (79 kg)	Apr 24, 2015
Malik Newman; PG	Recruit ratings: Scout: Rivals: 247Sports: ESPN:				
Joseph Strugg; PF	Montgomery, AL	George Washington Carver (AL)	6 ft 8 in (2.03 m)	210 lb (95 kg)	Jun 11, 2013
Joseph Strugg; PF	Recruit ratings: Scout: Rivals: 247Sports: ESPN:				
Quinndary Weatherspoon; SG	Canton, MS	Velma Jackson (MS)	6 ft 5 in (1.96 m)	184 lb (83 kg)	Jul 30, 2014
Quinndary Weatherspoon; SG	Recruit ratings: Scout: Rivals: 247Sports: ESPN:				
Overall recruit ranking: Scout: 16 Rivals: 25 247Sports: 23 ESPN: 19
Note: In many cases, Scout, Rivals, 247Sports, On3, and ESPN may conflict in their listings of height and weight.; In these cases, the average was taken. ESPN grades are on a 100-point scale.; Sources: "Mississippi State 2015 Basketball Commitments". Rivals.; "2015 Mississippi State Basketball Commits". Scout.; "ESPN". ESPN.; "Scout.com Team Recruiting Rankings". Scout.; "2015 Team Ranking". Rivals.

In addition, the Bulldogs added a transfer in Xavian Stapleton from Louisiana Tech. Stapleton will have to sit out the 2015–16 but will then have 3 years of eligibility.

== Roster ==
2015–16 Mississippi State Bulldogs men's basketball team
Players
Coaches

Pos.	#	Name	Height	Weight	Year	Previous school	Hometown
G	1	Fred Thomas	6 ft 5 in (1.96 m)	206 lb (93 kg)	Sr	Jim Hill HS	Jackson, MS
F	2	Demetrius Houston	6 ft 7 in (2.01 m)	205 lb (93 kg)	So	G. W. Carver HS	Montgomery, AL
F	4	Johnny Zuppardo	6 ft 9 in (2.06 m)	235 lb (107 kg)	RS Sr	Jones County JC	Bay St. Louis, MS
G	11	Quinndary Weatherspoon	6 ft 5 in (1.96 m)	184 lb (83 kg)	Fr	Velma Jackson HS	Camden, MS
G	13	Xavian Stapleton (redshirt)	6 ft 6 in (1.98 m)	190 lb (86 kg)	So	Madison Central HS	Flora, MS
G	14	Malik Newman	6 ft 3 in (1.91 m)	174 lb (79 kg)	Fr	Callaway HS	Jackson, MS
G	15	I.J. Ready	5 ft 11 in (1.8 m)	170 lb (77 kg)	Jr	Parkview Magnet HS	Little Rock, AR
F	20	Gavin Ware	6 ft 9 in (2.06 m)	260 lb (118 kg)	Sr	Starkville HS	Starkville, MS
C	22	Fallou Ndoye	6 ft 11 in (2.11 m)	220 lb (100 kg)	RS So	Findlay Prep	Senegal
F	23	Travis Daniels	6 ft 8 in (2.03 m)	215 lb (98 kg)	RS Sr	Shelton State CC	Russellville, AL
G	32	Craig Sword	6 ft 3 in (1.91 m)	194 lb (88 kg)	Sr	G. W. Carver HS	Montgomery, AL
F	35	Aric Holman	6 ft 9 in (2.06 m)	200 lb (91 kg)	Fr	Owensboro HS	Owensboro, KY

Head coach

- Ben Howland (Weber State)

Assistant coach(es)

- George Brooks (Mississippi State)
- Korey McCray (Mercer)
- Ernie Zeigler (Cleary)

Legend

- (C) Team captain
- (S) Suspended
- (I) Ineligible
- (W) Walk-on
- Injured
- Current redshirt

Roster

== Schedule and results ==
Date time, TV	Opponent	Result	Record	Site (attendance) city, state
Exhibition
11/06/2015*; 7:00 pm	Fort Valley State	W 95–56		Humphrey Coliseum; Starkville, MS
Non-conference regular season
11/13/2015*; 8:00 pm, SECN	Eastern Washington	W 106–88	1–0	Humphrey Coliseum (9,931); Starkville, MS
11/16/2015*; 7:00 pm	Southern	L 72–76	1–1	Humphrey Coliseum (5,895); Starkville, MS
11/19/2015*; 4:00 pm, ESPN2	vs. Miami (FL); Puerto Rico Tip-Off quarterfinals	L 79–105	1–2	Roberto Clemente Coliseum (1,947); San Juan, PR
11/20/2015*; 4:00 pm, ESPNU	vs. Texas Tech; Puerto Rico Tip-Off consolation round	L 72–74	1–3	Roberto Clemente Coliseum; San Juan, PR
11/22/2015*; 11:00 am, ESPN3	vs. Missouri State; Puerto Rico Tip-Off 7th place game	W 84–70	2–3	Roberto Clemente Coliseum; San Juan, PR
11/28/2015*; 12:00 pm	Tennessee–Martin	W 76–51	3–3	Humphrey Coliseum (7,150); Starkville, MS
12/02/2015*; 7:00 pm, SECN	Texas Southern	W 86–73	4–3	Humphrey Coliseum (6,239); Starkville, MS
12/12/2015*; 4:05 pm, ASN	at UMKC	L 67–72	4–4	Municipal Auditorium (2,886); Kansas City, MO
12/16/2015*; 8:00 pm, ESPN2	at Florida State	L 66–90	4–5	Donald L. Tucker Center (5,466); Tallahassee, FL
12/19/2015*; 3:00 pm, SECN	Tulane	W 69–59	5–5	Humphrey Coliseum (4,804); Starkville, MS
12/23/2015*; 7:00 pm, SECN	vs. Northern Colorado	W 93–69	6–5	Mississippi Coliseum (4,512); Jackson, MS
12/31/2015*; 1:00 pm	North Carolina Central	W 71–48	7–5	Humphrey Coliseum (2,016); Starkville, MS
SEC regular season
01/06/2016; 8:00 pm, SECN	No. 21 Texas A&M	L 60–61	7–6 (0–1)	Humphrey Coliseum (6,693); Starkville, MS
01/09/2016; 2:30 pm, SECN	at Arkansas	L 68–82	7–7 (0–2)	Bud Walton Arena (11,157); Fayetteville, AR
01/12/2016; 6:00 pm, ESPN	at No. 14 Kentucky	L 74–80	7–8 (0–3)	Rupp Arena (23,897); Lexington, KY
01/16/2016; 2:30 pm, SECN	Tennessee	L 75–80	7–9 (0–4)	Humphrey Coliseum (5,926); Starkville, MS
01/19/2016; 6:00 pm, ESPNU	at Florida	L 78–81	7–10 (0–5)	O'Connell Center (8,250); Gainesville, FL
01/23/2016; 1:00 pm, SECN	Ole Miss	W 83–77	8–10 (1–5)	Humphrey Coliseum (8,932); Starkville, MS
01/26/2016; 6:00 pm, SECN	at South Carolina	L 74–84	8–11 (1–6)	Colonial Life Arena (12,764); Columbia, SC
01/30/2016; 7:30 pm, SECN	at Missouri	W 76–62	9–11 (2–6)	Mizzou Arena (7,175); Columbia, MO
02/02/2016; 8:00 pm, SECN	Alabama	L 80–82 ^{OT}	9–12 (2–7)	Humphrey Coliseum (6,265); Starkville, MS
02/06/2016; 5:00 pm, ESPN2	at LSU	L 77–88	9–13 (2–8)	Maravich Center (13,123); Baton Rouge, LA
02/09/2016; 8:00 pm, SECN	Arkansas	W 78–46	10–13 (3–8)	Humphrey Coliseum (6,272); Starkville, MS
02/13/2016; 7:00 pm, SECN	Georgia	L 57–66	10–14 (3–9)	Humphrey Coliseum (6,811); Starkville, MS
02/16/2016; 8:00 pm, SECN	Vanderbilt	W 75–74	11–14 (4–9)	Humphrey Coliseum (6,194); Starkville, MS
02/20/2016; 1:30 pm, SECN	at Alabama	W 67–61	12–14 (5–9)	Coleman Coliseum (15,383); Tuscaloosa, AL
02/24/2016; 6:00 pm, ESPN2	at No. 21 Texas A&M	L 66–68	12–15 (5–10)	Reed Arena (8,312); College Station, TX
02/27/2016; 1:30 pm, SECN	South Carolina	W 68–58	13–15 (6–10)	Humphrey Coliseum (7,488); Starkville, MS
03/02/2016; 6:00 pm, SECN	at Ole Miss	L 78–86	13–16 (6–11)	The Pavilion at Ole Miss (9,500); Oxford, MS
03/05/2016; 1:30 pm, SECN	Auburn	W 79–66	14–16 (7–11)	Humphrey Coliseum (7,722); Starkville, MS
SEC tournament
03/10/2016; 8:30 pm	vs. Georgia; Second round	L 69–79	14–17	Bridgestone Arena (11,750); Nashville, TN
*Non-conference game. ^{#}Rankings from AP Poll. (#) Tournament seedings in parentheses. All times are in Central Time.

== See also ==
2015–16 Mississippi State Lady Bulldogs basketball team
