= 2017–18 Mississippi State Bulldogs men's basketball team =

American college basketball season

2017–18 Mississippi State Bulldogs men's basketball

NIT, Semifinals
- Conference: Southeastern Conference
- Record: 25–12 (9–9 SEC)
- Head coach: Ben Howland (3rd season)
- Assistant coaches: George Brooks; Korey McCray; Ernie Zeigler
- Home arena: Humphrey Coliseum

2017–18 Southeastern Conference men's basketball standings
	Conf.				Overall
Team	W		L	PCT	W		L	PCT
No. 19 Auburn	13	–	5	.722	26	–	8	.765
No. 13 Tennessee	13	–	5	.722	26	–	9	.743
No. 23 Florida	11	–	7	.611	21	–	13	.618
No. 18 Kentucky †	10	–	8	.556	26	–	11	.703
Missouri	10	–	8	.556	20	–	13	.606
Arkansas	10	–	8	.556	23	–	12	.657
Mississippi State	9	–	9	.500	25	–	12	.676
Texas A&M	9	–	9	.500	22	–	13	.629
Alabama	8	–	10	.444	20	–	16	.556
LSU	8	–	10	.444	18	–	15	.545
Georgia	7	–	11	.389	18	–	15	.545
South Carolina	7	–	11	.389	17	–	16	.515
Vanderbilt	6	–	12	.333	12	–	20	.375
Ole Miss	5	–	13	.278	12	–	20	.375
† 2018 SEC tournament winner Rankings from AP poll

The 2017–18 Mississippi State Bulldogs basketball team represented Mississippi State University in the 2017–18 NCAA Division I men's basketball season. The Bulldogs, led by third-year head coach Ben Howland, played their home games at the Humphrey Coliseum in Starkville, Mississippi as members of the Southeastern Conference. They finished the season 25–12, 9–9 in SEC play to finish in a tie for seventh place. They defeated LSU in the second round of the SEC tournament before losing in the quarterfinals to Tennessee. They were received an at-large bid to the National Invitation Tournament where they defeated Nebraska, Baylor, and Louisville to advance to the semifinals where they lost to Penn State.

== Previous season ==
The Bulldogs finished the 2016–17 season 16–16, 6–12 in SEC play to finish in 12th place. They defeated LSU in the SEC tournament before losing in the second round to Alabama.

== Offseason ==
=== Departures ===
Name	Number	Pos.	Height	Weight	Year	Hometown	Notes
Mario Kegler	4	F	6'7"	230	Freshman	Jackson, MS	Transferred to Baylor
Joe Strugg	5	F	6'9"	196	RS Freshman	Montgomery, AL	Walk-on; left the team
I. J. Ready	15	G	5'11"	170	Senior	Little Rock, AR	Graduated
Miles Washington	20	C	6'7"	195	Freshman	New Albany, MS	Walk-on; left the team

=== Incoming transfers ===
Name	Number	Pos.	Height	Weight	Year	Hometown	Previous School
Mitch Storm	5	F	6'6"	195	Sophomore	Madison, MS	Junior college transferred from East Mississippi CC

=== 2017 recruiting class ===
College recruiting information
Name	Hometown	School	Height	Weight	Commit date
Nick Weatherspoon #10 PG	Camden, MS	Velma Jackson Magnet High School	6 ft 2 in (1.88 m)	175 lb (79 kg)	Sep 11, 2016
Nick Weatherspoon #10 PG	Recruit ratings: Scout: Rivals: 247Sports: ESPN:				
KeyShawn Feazell #45 PF	Monticello, MS	Lawrence County High School	6 ft 8 in (2.03 m)	185 lb (84 kg)	Oct 13, 2016
KeyShawn Feazell #45 PF	Recruit ratings: Scout: Rivals: 247Sports: ESPN:				
Overall recruit ranking: Scout: 16 Rivals: 25 247Sports: 23 ESPN: 19
Note: In many cases, Scout, Rivals, 247Sports, On3, and ESPN may conflict in their listings of height and weight.; In these cases, the average was taken. ESPN grades are on a 100-point scale.; Sources: "Mississippi State 2017 Basketball Commitments". Rivals.; "2017 Mississippi State Basketball Commits". Scout.; "ESPN". ESPN.; "Scout.com Team Recruiting Rankings". Scout.; "2017 Team Ranking". Rivals.

=== 2018 recruiting class ===
College recruiting information
Name	Hometown	School	Height	Weight	Commit date
Reggie Perry; PF	Thomasville, Georgia	Thomasville High School	6 ft 9 in (2.06 m)	225 lb (102 kg)	Jul 17, 2017
Reggie Perry; PF	Recruit ratings: Scout: Rivals: 247Sports: ESPN:				
D. J. Stewart; SF	Benoit, Mississippi	Riverside High School	6 ft 6 in (1.98 m)	190 lb (86 kg)	Jul 24, 2017
D. J. Stewart; SF	Recruit ratings: Scout: Rivals: 247Sports: ESPN:				
Robert Woodard II; SF	Columbus, Mississippi	Columbus High School	6 ft 6 in (1.98 m)	200 lb (91 kg)	Nov 14, 2017
Robert Woodard II; SF	Recruit ratings: Scout: Rivals: 247Sports: ESPN:				
Jethro Tshisumpa; C	Lubumbashi, Democratic Republic of the Congo	San Jacinto College	6 ft 10 in (2.08 m)	260 lb (120 kg)	Feb 18, 2018
Jethro Tshisumpa; C	Recruit ratings: Scout: Rivals: 247Sports:				
Overall recruit ranking:
Note: In many cases, Scout, Rivals, 247Sports, On3, and ESPN may conflict in their listings of height and weight.; In these cases, the average was taken. ESPN grades are on a 100-point scale.; Sources: "Mississippi State 2018 Basketball Commitments". Rivals.; "2017 Mississippi State Basketball Commits". Scout.; "ESPN". ESPN.; "Scout.com Team Recruiting Rankings". Scout.; "2018 Team Ranking". Rivals.

== Roster ==
2017–18 Mississippi State Bulldogs men's basketball team
Players
Coaches

Pos.	#	Name	Height	Weight	Year	Previous school	Hometown
G	0	Nick Weatherspoon	6 ft 2 in (1.88 m)	195 lb (88 kg)	Fr	Velma Jackson HS	Camden, MS
G	1	Lamar Peters	6 ft 0 in (1.83 m)	185 lb (84 kg)	So	Landry-Walker HS	New Orleans, LA
G	3	Xavian Stapleton	6 ft 6 in (1.98 m)	210 lb (95 kg)	RS Jr	Madison Central HS; Louisiana Tech	Flora, MS
F	5	Mitch Storm	6 ft 7 in (2.01 m)	202 lb (92 kg)	So	Madison Central HS; East Mississippi CC	Madison, MS
G	10	Tate Clayton (W)	6 ft 2 in (1.88 m)	170 lb (77 kg)	Fr	Tupelo HS	Tupelo, MS
G	11	Quinndary Weatherspoon	6 ft 4 in (1.93 m)	205 lb (93 kg)	Jr	Velma Jackson HS	Camden, MS
G	12	Drew Davis (W)	5 ft 10 in (1.78 m)	165 lb (75 kg)	Sr	Fort Walton Beach HS	Atlanta, GA
G	13	Nick Singleton	6 ft 5 in (1.96 m)	195 lb (88 kg)	Jr	Columbia HS; Kennesaw State	Decatur, GA
G	15	T. J. Ready (W)	6 ft 0 in (1.83 m)	170 lb (77 kg)	So	Columbus HS	Columbus, MS
F	22	KeyShawn Feazell	6 ft 8 in (2.03 m)	230 lb (104 kg)	Fr	Lawrence County HS	New Hebron, MS
G	23	Tyson Carter	6 ft 4 in (1.93 m)	165 lb (75 kg)	So	Starkville HS	Starkville, MS
F	24	Abdul Ado	6 ft 11 in (2.11 m)	250 lb (113 kg)	RS Fr	Hamilton Heights HS	Chattanooga, TN
G	32	Eli Wright	6 ft 4 in (1.93 m)	190 lb (86 kg)	So	IMG Academy	Owensboro, KY
C	34	Schnider Hérard	6 ft 10 in (2.08 m)	260 lb (118 kg)	So	Prestonwood Christian HS	Plano, TX
F	35	Aric Holman	6 ft 10 in (2.08 m)	225 lb (102 kg)	Jr	Owensboro HS	Owensboro, KY
C	45	E. J. Datcher	6 ft 9 in (2.06 m)	240 lb (109 kg)	So	Vincent HS	Vincent, AL

Head coach

- Ben Howland (Weber State)

Assistant coach(es)

- George Brooks (Mississippi State)
- Korey McCray (Mercer)
- Ernie Zeigler (Cleary)

Legend

- (C) Team captain
- (S) Suspended
- (I) Ineligible
- (W) Walk-on
- Injured
- Current redshirt

Roster

== Schedule and results ==
Date time, TV	Rank^{#}	Opponent^{#}	Result	Record	Site (attendance) city, state
Exhibition
Oct. 22, 2017*; 1:00 pm		Nebraska; Hurricane Irma charity game	L 72–76		Humphrey Coliseum; Starkville, MS
Nov 2, 2017*; 7:00 pm		West Florida	W 87–62		Humphrey Coliseum (1,711); Starkville, MS
Non-conference regular season
Nov 10, 2017*; 5:30 pm		Alabama State	W 96–68	1–0	Humphrey Coliseum (6,811); Starkville, MS
Nov 18, 2017*; 1:00 pm		Florida A&M; Hoops in the Heartland	W 79–48	2–0	Humphrey Coliseum (6,132); Starkville, MS
Nov 20, 2017*; 7:00 pm		Green Bay; Hoops in the Heartland	W 77–68	3-0	Humphrey Coliseum (6,359); Starkville, MS
Nov 22, 2017*; 7:00 pm		Stephen F. Austin; Hoops in the Heartland	W 80–75	4–0	Humphrey Coliseum (7,687); Starkville, MS
Nov 26, 2017*; 4:00 pm		Jacksonville State	W 59–56	5–0	Humphrey Coliseum (6,034); Starkville, MS
Nov 30, 2017*; 6:00 pm, SECN		North Dakota State; Hoops in the Heartland	W 83–59	6–0	Humphrey Coliseum (5,831); Starkville, MS
Dec 3, 2017*; 7:00 pm, SECN		Dayton	W 61–59	7–0	Humphrey Coliseum (7,539); Starkville, MS
Dec 9, 2017*; 4:00 pm		North Georgia	W 95–62	8–0	Humphrey Coliseum (6,613); Starkville, MS
Dec 12, 2017*; 6:00 pm, ESPN2		at No. 25 Cincinnati	L 50–65	8–1	BB&T Arena (8,128); Highland Heights, KY
Dec 16, 2017*; 7:00 pm		UT Martin	W 92–61	9–1	Humphrey Coliseum (6,709); Starkville, MS
Dec 20, 2017*; 7:00 pm		Little Rock	W 64–48	10–1	Humphrey Coliseum (7,156); Starkville, MS
Dec 23, 2017*; 7:00 pm		vs. Southern Miss; Jackson Showcase	W 70–64	11–1	Mississippi Coliseum (4,028); Jackson, MS
Dec 30, 2017*; 3:00 pm, SECN+		North Florida	W 109–81	12–1	Humphrey Coliseum (7,764); Starkville, MS
SEC regular season
Jan 2, 2018; 8:00 pm, SECN		No. 22 Arkansas	W 78–75	13–1 (1–0)	Humphrey Coliseum (6,324); Starkville, MS
Jan 6, 2018; 3:30 pm, SECN		at Ole Miss	L 58–64	13–2 (1–1)	The Pavilion at Ole Miss (8,664); Oxford, MS
Jan 10, 2018; 6:00 pm, SECN		at Florida	L 54–71	13–3 (1–2)	O'Connell Center (9,917); Gainesville, FL
Jan 13, 2018; 2:30 pm, SECN		No. 22 Auburn	L 68–76	13–4 (1–3)	Humphrey Coliseum (8,443); Starkville, MS
Jan 16, 2018; 6:00 pm, SECN		Vanderbilt	W 80–62	14–4 (2–3)	Humphrey Coliseum (6,633); Starkville, MS
Jan 20, 2018; 7:30 pm, SECN		at Alabama	L 62–68	14–5 (2–4)	Coleman Coliseum (15,383); Tuscaloosa, AL
Jan 23, 2018; 8:00 pm, ESPN		at Kentucky	L 65–78	14–6 (2–5)	Rupp Arena (20,609); Lexington, KY
Jan 27, 2018; 7:30 pm, SECN		Missouri	W 74–62	15–6 (3–5)	Humphrey Coliseum (7,169); Starkville, MS
Jan 31, 2018; 7:30 pm, SECN		at South Carolina	W 81–76	16–6 (4–5)	Colonial Life Arena (11,042); Columbia, SC
Feb 3, 2018; 5:00 pm, ESPNU		Georgia	W 72–57	17–6 (5–5)	Humphrey Coliseum (7,775); Starkville, MS
Feb 6, 2018; 6:00 pm, SECN		Alabama	W 67–63	18–6 (6–5)	Humphrey Coliseum (7,095); Starkville, MS
Feb 10, 2018; 1:00 pm, ESPN2		at Missouri	L 85–89 ^{OT}	18–7 (6–6)	Mizzou Arena (15,061); Columbia, MO
Feb 14, 2018; 6:00 pm, SECN		at Vanderbilt	L 80–81	18–8 (6–7)	Memorial Gymnasium (8,592); Nashville, TN
Feb 17, 2018; 7:30 pm, SECN		Ole Miss	W 79–62	19–8 (7–7)	Humphrey Coliseum (9,002); Starkville, MS
Feb 20, 2018; 6:00 pm, SECN		at Texas A&M	W 93–81	20–8 (8–7)	Reed Arena (8,614); College Station, TX
Feb 24, 2018; 2:30 pm, SECN		South Carolina	W 72–68 ^{OT}	21–8 (9–7)	Humphrey Coliseum (8,162); Starkville, MS
Feb 27, 2018; 6:00 pm, SECN		No. 16 Tennessee	L 54–76	21–9 (9–8)	Humphrey Coliseum (7,548); Starkville, MS
Mar 3, 2018; 12:00 pm, SECN		at LSU	L 57–78	21–10 (9–9)	Maravich Center (9,067); Baton Rouge, LA
SEC tournament
Mar 8, 2018; 6:00 pm, SECN	(7)	vs. (10) LSU; Second Round	W 80–77	22–10	Scottrade Center (11,752); St. Louis, MO
Mar 9, 2018; 6:00 pm, SECN	(7)	vs. (2) No. 13 Tennessee; Quarterfinals	L 59–62	22–11	Scottrade Center (14,596); St. Louis, MO
NIT
Mar 14, 2018*; 8:00 pm, ESPN2	(4)	(5) Nebraska; First Round – Baylor Bracket	W 66–59	23–11	Humphrey Coliseum (3,485); Starkville, MS
Mar 18, 2018*; 11:00 am, ESPN	(4)	at (1) Baylor; Second Round – Baylor Bracket	W 78–77	24–11	Ferrell Center (2,246); Waco, TX
Mar 20, 2018*; 8:00 pm, ESPN	(4)	at (2) Louisville; Quarterfinals – Baylor Bracket	W 79–56	25–11	KFC Yum! Center (10,718); Louisville, KY
Mar 27, 2018*; 6:00 pm, ESPN	(4)	vs. (4) Penn State; Semifinals	L 60–75	25–12	Madison Square Garden (7,865); New York City, NY
*Non-conference game. ^{#}Rankings from AP Poll. (#) Tournament seedings in parentheses. All times are in Central Time.
