= Willie Young (offensive tackle, born 1947) =

American football player (1947–2008)

No. 60, 68, 76
- Position: Offensive tackle

Personal information
- Born: November 12, 1947; Jefferson County, Mississippi, U.S.
- Died: September 3, 2008 (aged 60); Jackson, Mississippi, U.S.
- Listed height: 6 ft 4 in (1.93 m)
- Listed weight: 270 lb (122 kg)

Career information
- High school: Brinkley (Jackson, Mississippi)
- College: Alcorn State (1966–1969)
- NFL draft: 1970: undrafted

Career history
- Edmonton Eskimos (1970); Oakland Raiders (1971)*; Buffalo Bills (1971–1972); San Francisco 49ers (1973)*; Miami Dolphins (1973)
- * Offseason or practice squad member only

Awards and highlights
- Super Bowl champion (VIII); 2× Black college national champion (1968, 1969)
- Stats at Pro Football Reference

Willie Charles Young (November 12, 1947 – September 3, 2008) was an American professional football player who was an offensive tackle for three seasons in the National Football League (NFL) with the Buffalo Bills and Miami Dolphins. He played college football at Alcorn Agricultural and Mechanical College.

== Early life and college ==
Willie Charles Young was born on November 12, 1947, in Jefferson County, Mississippi. He played football and basketball at Brinkley High School in Jackson, Mississippi.

Young was a four-year letterman for the Alcorn A&M Braves of Alcorn Agricultural and Mechanical College from 1966 to 1969. The Braves were Black college national champions in 1968 and 1969. He was inducted into the school's athletics hall of fame in 2001.

== Professional career ==
Young went undrafted in the 1970 NFL draft. He then played in two games for the Edmonton Eskimos of the Canadian Football League during the 1970 season.

He signed with the Oakland Raiders in 1971 but was later waived.

Young was claimed off waivers by the Buffalo Bills in 1971. He played in all 14 games, starting seven, for the Bills during the 1971 season. The Bills finished the year with a 1–13 record. He appeared in one game in 1972 before being released.

Young signed with the San Francisco 49ers in 1973. However, he was later released.

Young was signed by the Miami Dolphins in 1973. He played in one game for the Dolphins during the 1973 season. He was also active, but did not play, in the playoff game against the Cincinnati Bengals and the AFC Championship Game against the Raiders. On January 13, 1974, the Dolphins beat the Minnesota Vikings in Super Bowl VIII by a score of 24–7. Young did play in the Super Bowl but received a half-share of the winnings worth $7,500. He re-signed with the Dolphins in 1974 but was released.

== Personal life ==
Young was the head football coach at Velma Jackson High School in Camden, Mississippi, Weston High School in Greenville, Mississippi, and W. H. Lanier High School in Jackson, accumulating an overall record of 89–76–3. He died on September 3, 2008, in Jackson.
