= MHSAA =

MHSAA can refer to:

- Michigan High School Athletic Association
- Mississippi High School Activities Association
- Missouri High School Athletic Association
