= 2010 Major League Baseball draft =

Baseball draft of amateur players

General information
- Date: June 7–9, 2010
- Location: Secaucus, New Jersey
- Network: MLB Network

Overview
- 1525 total selections
- First selection: Bryce Harper; Washington Nationals
- First round selections: 50

The 2010 Major League Baseball draft was held on June 7–9, 2010 at the MLB Network Studios in Secaucus, New Jersey.

== First-round selections ==
The draft order was determined based on the 2009 MLB standings, with the worst team picking first.

Key

	All-Star
*	Player did not sign

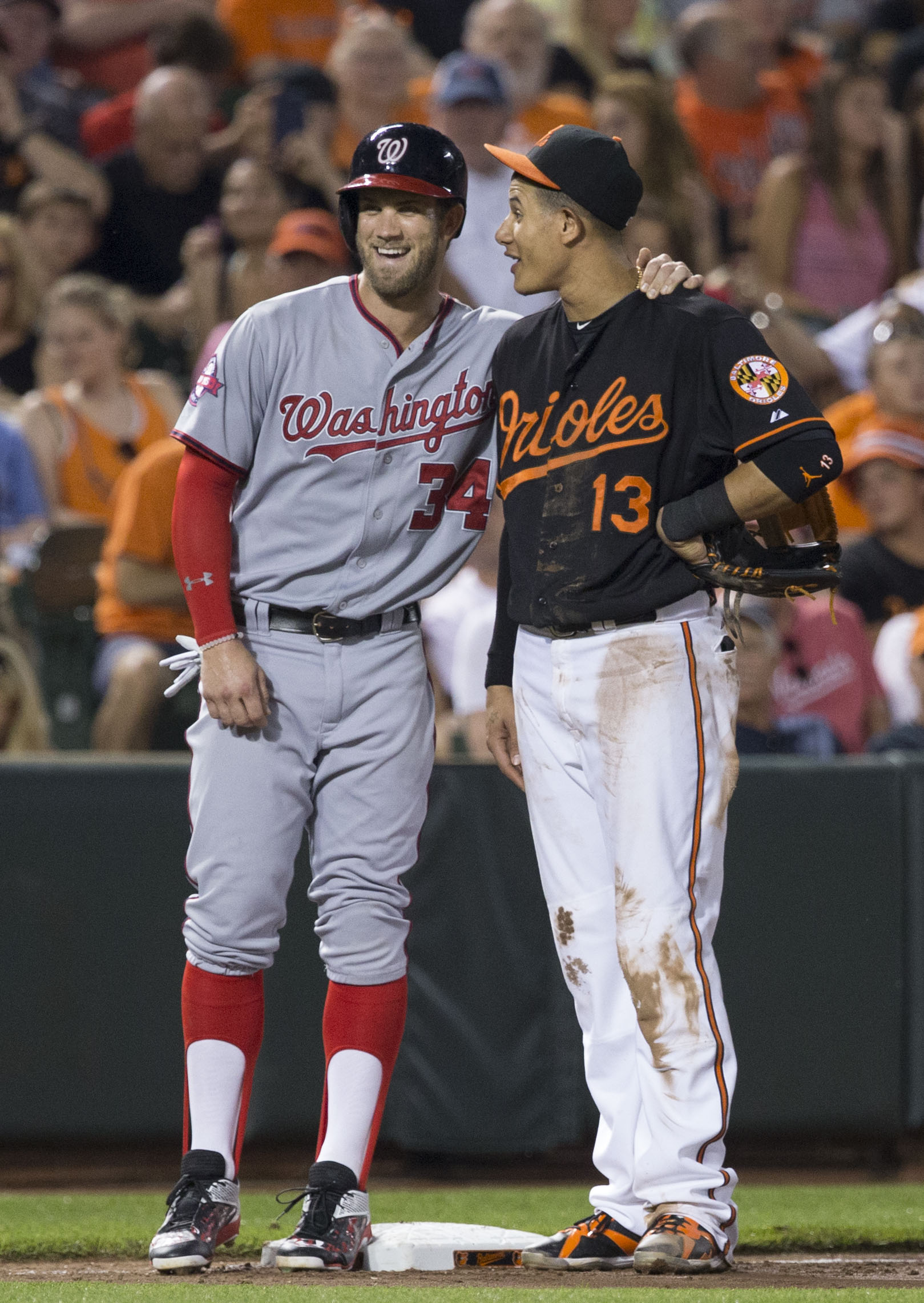
First overall selection Bryce Harper (left) and third overall selection Manny Machado in 2015

Pick	Player	Team	Position	School
1	Bryce Harper	Washington Nationals	Outfielder	Southern Nevada
2	Jameson Taillon	Pittsburgh Pirates	Right-handed pitcher	The Woodlands High School (TX)
3	Manny Machado	Baltimore Orioles	Shortstop	Brito Miami Private School (FL)
4	Christian Colón	Kansas City Royals	Shortstop	Cal State Fullerton
5	Drew Pomeranz	Cleveland Indians	Left-handed pitcher	Ole Miss
6	Barret Loux*	Arizona Diamondbacks	Right-handed pitcher	Texas A&M
7	Matt Harvey	New York Mets	Right-handed pitcher	North Carolina
8	Delino DeShields, Jr.	Houston Astros	Second baseman	Woodward Academy (GA)
9	Karsten Whitson*	San Diego Padres	Right-handed pitcher	Chipley High School (FL)
10	Michael Choice	Oakland Athletics	Outfielder	Texas–Arlington
11	Deck McGuire	Toronto Blue Jays	Right-handed pitcher	Georgia Tech
12	Yasmani Grandal	Cincinnati Reds	Catcher	Miami
13	Chris Sale	Chicago White Sox	Left-handed pitcher	Florida Gulf Coast
14	Dylan Covey*	Milwaukee Brewers	Right-handed pitcher	Maranatha High School (CA)
15	Jake Skole	Texas Rangers (Note: Compensation for unsigned 2009 pick Matt Purke)	Outfielder	Blessed Trinity High School (GA)
16	Hayden Simpson	Chicago Cubs	Right-handed pitcher	Southern Arkansas
17	Josh Sale	Tampa Bay Rays	Outfielder	Bishop Blanchet High School (WA)
18	Kaleb Cowart	Los Angeles Angels of Anaheim (Note: Pick from the Seattle Mariners for loss of Type A free agent Chone Figgins)	Third baseman	Cook High School (GA)
19	Mike Foltynewicz	Houston Astros (Note: Pick from the Detroit Tigers for loss of Type A free agent José Valverde)	Right-handed pitcher	Minooka Community High School (IL)
20	Kolbrin Vitek	Boston Red Sox (Note: Pick from the Atlanta Braves for loss of Type A free agent Billy Wagner)	Second baseman	Ball State
21	Alex Wimmers	Minnesota Twins	Right-handed pitcher	Ohio State
22	Kellin Deglan	Texas Rangers	Catcher	R. E. Mountain Secondary School (Canada)
23	Christian Yelich	Florida Marlins	Outfielder	Westlake High School (CA)
24	Gary Brown	San Francisco Giants	Outfielder	Cal State Fullerton
25	Zack Cox	St. Louis Cardinals	Third baseman	Arkansas
26	Kyle Parker	Colorado Rockies	Outfielder	Clemson
27	Jesse Biddle	Philadelphia Phillies	Left-handed pitcher	Germantown Friends High School (PA)
28	Zach Lee	Los Angeles Dodgers	Right-handed pitcher	McKinney High School (TX)
29	Cam Bedrosian	Los Angeles Angels of Anaheim (Note: Pick from the Boston Red Sox for loss of Type A free agent John Lackey)	Right-handed pitcher	East Coweta High School (GA)
30	Chevy Clarke	Los Angeles Angels	Outfielder	Marietta High School (GA)
31	Justin O'Conner	Tampa Bay Rays (Note: Compensation for unsigned 2009 pick LeVon Washington)	Catcher	Cowan High School (IN)
32	Cito Culver	New York Yankees	Shortstop	West Irondequoit High School (NY)

== Supplemental first-round selections ==
The "sandwich picks" after the first round are compensation for losses of free agents during the 2009–10 offseason.

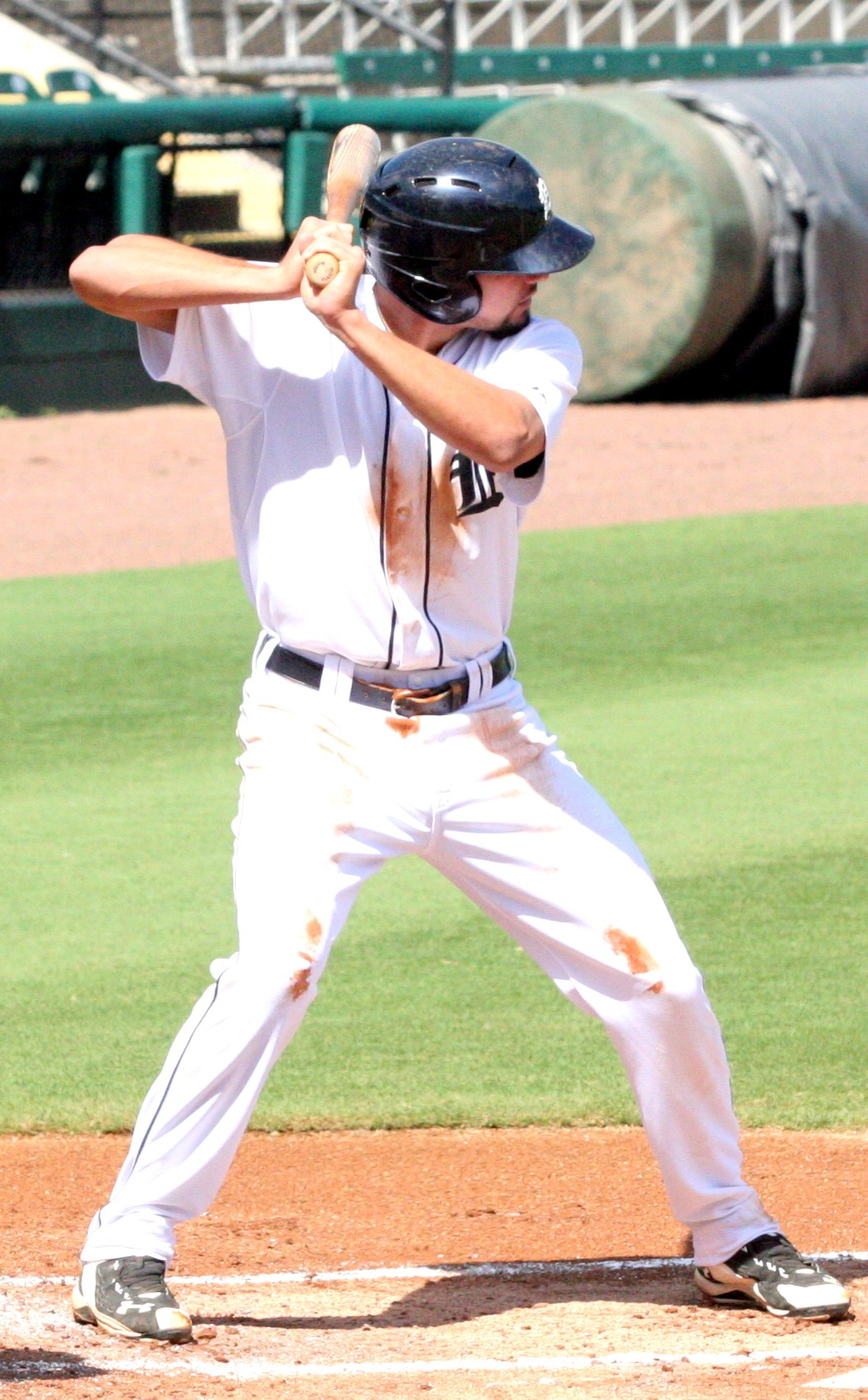
Nick Castellanos

Pick	Player	Team	Position	School
33	Michael Kvasnicka	Houston Astros (Note: Compensation for loss of Type A free agent José Valverde)	Catcher	Minnesota
34	Aaron Sanchez	Toronto Blue Jays (Note: Compensation for loss of Type A free agent Marco Scutaro)	Right-handed pitcher	Barstow High School (CA)
35	Matt Lipka	Atlanta Braves (Note: Compensation for loss of Type A free agent Michael Gonzalez)	Shortstop	McKinney High School (TX)
36	Bryce Brentz	Boston Red Sox (Note: Compensation for loss of Type A free agent Jason Bay)	Outfielder	Middle Tennessee
37	Taylor Lindsey	Los Angeles Angels of Anaheim (Note: Compensation for loss of Type A free agent John Lackey)	Shortstop	Desert Mountain High School (AZ)
38	Noah Syndergaard	Toronto Blue Jays (Note: Compensation for unsigned 2009 pick James Paxton)	Right-handed pitcher	Legacy High School (TX)
39	Anthony Ranaudo	Boston Red Sox (Note: Compensation for loss of Type A free agent Billy Wagner)	Right-handed pitcher	Louisiana State
40	Ryan Bolden	Los Angeles Angels of Anaheim (Note: Compensation for loss of Type A free agent Chone Figgins)	Outfielder	Madison Central High School (MS)
41	Asher Wojciechowski	Toronto Blue Jays (Note: Compensation for loss of Type B free agent Rod Barajas)	Right-handed pitcher	The Citadel
42	Drew Vettleson	Tampa Bay Rays (Note: Compensation for loss of Type B free agent Gregg Zaun)	Outfielder	Central Kitsap High School (WA)
43	Taijuan Walker	Seattle Mariners (Note: Compensation for loss of Type B free agent Adrián Beltré)	Right-handed pitcher	Yucaipa High School (CA)
44	Nick Castellanos	Detroit Tigers (Note: Compensation for loss of Type B free agent Brandon Lyon)	Third baseman	Archbishop McCarthy High School (FL)
45	Luke Jackson	Texas Rangers (Note: Compensation for loss of Type B free agent Marlon Byrd)	Right-handed pitcher	Calvary Christian Academy (FL)
46	Seth Blair	St. Louis Cardinals (Note: Compensation for loss of Type B free agent Mark DeRosa)	Right-handed pitcher	Arizona State
47	Peter Tago	Colorado Rockies (Note: Compensation for loss of Type B free agent Jason Marquis)	Right-handed pitcher	Dana Hills High School (CA)
48	Chance Ruffin	Detroit Tigers (Note: Compensation for loss of Type B free agent Fernando Rodney)	Right-handed pitcher	Texas
49	Mike Olt	Texas Rangers (Note: Compensation for loss of Type B free agent Iván Rodríguez)	Third baseman	Connecticut
50	Tyrell Jenkins	St. Louis Cardinals (Note: Compensation for loss of Type B free agent Joel Piñeiro)	Right-handed pitcher	Henderson High School (TX)

== Other notable selections ==
Round	Pick	Player	Team	Position	School
2	51	Sammy Solís	Washington Nationals	Left-handed pitcher	San Diego
2	53	Todd Cunningham	Atlanta Braves	Outfielder	Jacksonville State
2	54	Brett Eibner	Kansas City Royals	Outfielder	Arkansas
2	57	Brandon Workman	Boston Red Sox	Right-handed pitcher	Texas
2	58	Vince Velasquez	Houston Astros	Right-handed pitcher	Garey High School (CA)
2	59	Jedd Gyorko	San Diego Padres	Second baseman	West Virginia
2	63	Jake Petricka	Chicago White Sox	Right-handed pitcher	Indiana State
2	64	Jimmy Nelson	Milwaukee Brewers	Right-handed pitcher	Alabama
2	68	Drew Smyly	Detroit Tigers	Left-handed pitcher	Arkansas
2	70	Andrelton Simmons	Atlanta Braves	Shortstop	Western Oklahoma State College
2	71	Niko Goodrum	Minnesota Twins	Shortstop	Fayette County High School (GA)
2	73	Rob Rasmussen	Florida Marlins	Left-handed pitcher	UCLA
2	74	Jarrett Parker	San Francisco Giants	Outfielder	Virginia
2	76	Chad Bettis	Colorado Rockies	Right-handed pitcher	Texas Tech
2	77	Perci Garner	Philadelphia Phillies	Right-handed pitcher	Ball State
2	79	Derek Dietrich	Tampa Bay Rays	Shortstop	Georgia Tech
2	80	Justin Nicolino	Toronto Blue Jays	Left-handed pitcher	University High School (FL)
3	87	Tony Wolters	Cleveland Indians	Shortstop	Rancho Buena Vista High School (CA)
3	95	Addison Reed	Chicago White Sox	Right-handed pitcher	San Diego State
3	96	Tyler Thornburg	Milwaukee Brewers	Right-handed pitcher	Charleston Southern
3	98	Ryan Brett	Tampa Bay Rays	Shortstop	Highline High School (WA)
3	99	Ryne Stanek*	Seattle Mariners	Right-handed pitcher	Blue Valley High School (KS)
3	100	Rob Brantly	Detroit Tigers	Catcher	UC Riverside
3	102	Pat Dean	Minnesota Twins	Left-handed pitcher	Boston College
3	104	J. T. Realmuto	Florida Marlins	Shortstop	Carl Albert High School (OK)
3	106	Sam Tuivailala	St. Louis Cardinals	Shortstop	Aragon High School (CA)
3	107	Josh Rutledge	Colorado Rockies	Shortstop	Alabama
3	108	Cameron Rupp	Philadelphia Phillies	Catcher	Texas
3	112	Rob Segedin	New York Yankees	Third baseman	Tulane
3	115	Donn Roach	Los Angeles Angels of Anaheim	Right-handed pitcher	College of Southern Nevada
4	116	A. J. Cole	Washington Nationals	Right-handed pitcher	Oviedo High School (FL)
4	117	Nick Kingham	Pittsburgh Pirates	Right-handed pitcher	Sierra Vista High School (NV)
4	119	Kevin Chapman	Kansas City Royals	Left-handed pitcher	Florida
4	126	Sam Dyson	Toronto Blue Jays	Right-handed pitcher	South Carolina
4	132	James Paxton	Seattle Mariners	Left-handed pitcher	Kentucky
4	135	Eddie Rosario	Minnesota Twins	Outfielder	Rafael López Landrón High School (PR)
4	136	Drew Robinson	Texas Rangers	Shortstop	Silverado High School (NV)
4	137	Andrew Toles*	Florida Marlins	Outfielder	Sandy Creek High School (GA)
4	138	Seth Rosin	San Francisco Giants	Right-handed pitcher	Minnesota
4	139	Cody Stanley	St. Louis Cardinals	Catcher	UNC Wilmington
4	140	Russell Wilson	Colorado Rockies	Second Baseman	NC State
4	143	Garin Cecchini	Boston Red Sox	Shortstop	Alfred M. Barbe High School (LA)
4	145	Mason Williams	New York Yankees	Outfielder	West Orange High School (FL)
5	149	Jason Adam	Kansas City Royals	Right-handed pitcher	Blue Valley Northwest High School (KS)
5	152	Matt den Dekker	New York Mets	Outfielder	Florida
5	154	Rico Noel	San Diego Padres	Outfielder	Coastal Carolina
5	158	Andy Wilkins	Chicago White Sox	First baseman	Arkansas
5	160	Matt Szczur	Chicago Cubs	Outfielder	Villanova
5	162	Stephen Pryor	Seattle Mariners	Right-handed pitcher	Tennessee Tech
5	164	Phil Gosselin	Atlanta Braves	Second baseman	Virginia
5	166	Justin Grimm	Texas Rangers	Right-handed pitcher	Georgia
5	168	Heath Hembree	San Francisco Giants	Right-handed pitcher	College of Charleston
5	173	Henry Ramos	Boston Red Sox	Outfielder	Alfonso Casta Martinez High School (PR)
5	175	Tommy Kahnle	New York Yankees	Right-handed pitcher	Lynn University
6	177	Jason Hursh*	New York Yankees	Right-handed pitcher	Trinity Christian Academy (TX)
6	179	Scott Alexander	Kansas City Royals	Left-handed pitcher	Sonoma State University
6	183	Adam Plutko*	Houston Astros	Right-handed pitcher	Glendora High School (CA)
6	184	Johnny Barbato	San Diego Padres	Right-handed pitcher	Felix Varela High School (FL)
6	186	Sean Nolin	Toronto Blue Jays	Left-handed pitcher	San Jacinto College
6	188	Rangel Ravelo	Chicago White Sox	Third baseman	Hialeah High School (FL)
6	191	Jesse Hahn	Tampa Bay Rays	Right-handed pitcher	Virginia Tech
6	193	Bryan Holaday	Detroit Tigers	Catcher	Texas Christian
6	194	Joey Terdoslavich	Atlanta Braves	Third baseman	Long Beach State
6	195	Logan Darnell	Minnesota Twins	Left-handed pitcher	Kentucky
6	196	Brett Nicholas	Texas Rangers	Catcher	Missouri
6	198	Mike Kickham	San Francisco Giants	Left-handed pitcher	Missouri State
6	199	John Gast	St. Louis Cardinals	Left-handed pitcher	Florida State
6	202	Kevin Gausman*	Los Angeles Dodgers	Right-handed pitcher	Grandview High School (CO)
7	218	Tyler Saladino	Chicago White Sox	Shortstop	Oral Roberts
7	221	Michael Lorenzen*	Tampa Bay Rays	Outfielder	Fullerton Union High School (CA)
7	227	Mark Canha	Florida Marlins	Outfielder	California
7	229	Greg Garcia	St. Louis Cardinals	Shortstop	Hawaii
7	231	David Buchanan	Philadelphia Phillies	Right-handed pitcher	Georgia State
7	234	Josh Osich*	Los Angeles Angels of Anaheim	Left-handed pitcher	Oregon State
8	236	Matt Grace	Washington Nationals	Left-handed pitcher	UCLA
8	239	Michael Mariot	Kansas City Royals	Right-handed pitcher	Nebraska
8	243	Jake Buchanan	Houston Astros	Right-handed pitcher	North Carolina State
8	251	Merrill Kelly	Tampa Bay Rays	Right-handed pitcher	Arizona State
8	252	Jabari Blash	Seattle Mariners	Outfielder	Miami Dade College
8	260	Corey Dickerson	Colorado Rockies	Outfielder	Meridian Community College
8	264	Kole Calhoun	Los Angeles Angels of Anaheim	Outfielder	Arizona State
9	266	Aaron Barrett	Washington Nationals	Right-handed pitcher	Ole Miss
9	267	Brandon Cumpton	Pittsburgh Pirates	Right-handed pitcher	Georgia Tech
9	269	Whit Merrifield	Kansas City Royals	Outfielder	South Carolina
9	271	Zach Walters	Arizona Diamondbacks	Shortstop	San Diego
9	272	Jacob deGrom	New York Mets	Right-handed pitcher	Stetson
9	274	Josh Spence	San Diego Padres	Left-handed pitcher	Arizona State
9	279	Yadiel Rivera	Milwaukee Brewers	Shortstop	Manuela Toro High School (PR)
9	287	Austin Brice	Florida Marlins	Right-handed pitcher	Northwood High School (MD)
9	289	Tyler Lyons	St. Louis Cardinals	Left-handed pitcher	Oklahoma State
10	300	Tyler Holt	Cleveland Indians	Outfielder	Florida State
10	302	Akeel Morris	New York Mets	Right-handed pitcher	Charlotte Amalie High School
10	321	Mario Hollands	Philadelphia Phillies	Left-handed pitcher	California

- Chi Chi Gonzalez, 11th round, 328th overall by the Baltimore Orioles
- Chasen Shreve, 11th round, 344th overall by the Atlanta Braves
- Adam Duvall, 11th round, 348th overall by the San Francisco Giants
- Joc Pederson, 11th round, 352nd overall by the Los Angeles Dodgers
- Robbie Ray, 12th round, 356th overall by the Washington Nationals
- Stefen Romero, 12th round, 372nd overall by the Seattle Mariners
- Kyle Ryan, 12th round, 373rd overall by the Detroit Tigers
- Danny Burawa, 12th round, 385th overall by the New York Yankees
- A. J. Griffin, 13th round, 395th overall by the Oakland Athletics
- Tommy Medica, 14th round, 424th overall by the San Diego Padres
- Nick Tepesch, 14th round, 436th overall by the Texas Rangers
- Mike Bolsinger, 15th round, 451st overall by the Arizona Diamondbacks
- Steve Wilkerson, 15th round, 473rd overall by the Boston Red Sox, but did not sign
- Chase Whitley, 15th round, 475th overall by the New York Yankees
- Cody Allen, 16th round, 480th overall by the Cleveland Indians
- Dalton Pompey, 16th round, 486th overall by the Toronto Blue Jays
- Cody Anderson, 17th round, 521st overall by the Tampa Bay Rays
- Jason Garcia, 17th round, 533rd overall by the Boston Red Sox
- Preston Claiborne, 17th round, 535th overall by the New York Yankees
- Kris Bryant, 18th round, 546th overall by the Toronto Blue Jays, but did not sign.
- Adam Eaton, 19th round, 571st overall by the Arizona Diamondbacks
- Burch Smith, 20th round, 600th overall by the Cleveland Indians
- C. J. Riefenhauser, 20th round, 611th overall by the Tampa Bay Rays
- Cody Martin, 20th round, 615th overall by the Minnesota Twins
- Brett Bochy, 20th round, 618th overall by the San Francisco Giants
- Scott Copeland, 21st round, 628th overall by the Baltimore Orioles
- Josh Smith, 21st round, 637th overall by the Cincinnati Reds
- Kevin Shackelford, 21st round, 639th overall by the Milwaukee Brewers
- Adam Liberatore, 21st round, 641st overall by the Tampa Bay Rays
- Noel Cuevas, 21st round, 652nd overall by the Los Angeles Dodgers
- Ben Rowen, 22nd round, 676th overall by the Texas Rangers
- Evan Gattis, 23rd round, 704th overall by the Atlanta Braves
- Blake Treinen, 23rd round, 707th overall by the Florida Marlins, but did not sign
- Andrew Triggs, 24th round, 720th overall by the Cleveland Indians, but did not sign
- Erik Goeddel, 24th round, 722nd overall by the New York Mets
- Rocky Gale, 24th round, 724th overall by the San Diego Padres
- Christian Bergman, 24th round, 740th overall by the Colorado Rockies
- Casey Sadler, 25th round, 747th overall by the Pittsburgh Pirates
- Ken Roberts, 25th round, 770th overall by the Colorado Rockies
- A. J. Schugel, 25th round, 774th overall by the Los Angeles Angels of Anaheim
- Ben Lively, 26th round, 780th overall by the Cleveland Indians, but did not sign
- Danny Muno, 26th round, 790th overall by the Chicago Cubs
- Scott Schebler, 26th round, 790th overall by the Los Angeles Dodgers
- Alex Claudio, 27th round, 826th overall by the Texas Rangers
- Brandon Cunniff, 27th round, 827th overall by the Florida Marlins
- Marco Gonzales, 29th round, 890th overall by the Colorado Rockies, but did not sign
- Red Patterson, 29th round, 892nd overall by the Los Angeles Dodgers
- Taylor Hill, 30th round, 900th overall by the Cleveland Indians
- Josh Edgin, 30th round, 902nd overall by the New York Mets
- Shawn Tolleson, 30th round, 922nd overall by the Los Angeles Dodgers
- David Goforth, 31st round, 931st overall by the Cleveland Indians
- Aaron Judge, 31st round, 935th overall by the Oakland Athletics, but did not sign
- Kevin Kiermaier, 31st round, 941st overall by the Tampa Bay Rays
- Jason Rogers, 32nd round, 969th overall by the Milwaukee Brewers
- Matt Stites, 33rd round, 1000th overall by the Chicago Cubs
- Tyler Wilson, 35th round, 1057th overall by the Cincinnati Reds
- J. T. Riddle, 35th round, 1073rd overall by the Boston Red Sox, but did not sign
- Brock Stewart, 40th round, 1202nd overall by the New York Mets, but did not sign
- Javier J. Luque, 41st round, 1288th overall by the Chicago Cubs, but did not sign
- Chris Rearick, 41st round, 1241st overall by the Tampa Bay Rays
- Seth Maness, 41st round, 1247th overall by the Florida Marlins
- Matt Tracy, 43rd round, 1307th overall by the Florida Marlins
- A. J. Achter, 46th round, 1395th overall by the Minnesota Twins

=== NFL players drafted ===
- Russell Wilson, 4th round, 140th overall by the Colorado Rockies
- Blake Bell, 43rd round, 1303rd overall by the Detroit Tigers, but did not sign
- Golden Tate, 50th round, 1518th overall by the San Francisco Giants, but did not sign.

Preceded by Stephen Strasburg	1st Overall Picks; Bryce Harper	Succeeded by Gerrit Cole
