= Ridgeland High School (Mississippi) =

Location
- 586 Sunnybrook Road; Ridgeland, Madison County, Mississippi 39157; United States
- 32.4446°N 90.1361°W

Information
- Type: Public
- Established: 2002
- School district: Madison County School District
- Principal: Preston Nailor
- Teaching staff: 69.83 (on an FTE basis)
- Grades: 9–12
- Gender: Coeducational
- Enrollment: 1,000 (2023–2024)
- Student to teacher ratio: 14.32
- Colors: Navy, Titans Blue and White
- Athletics: 6A
- Mascot: Titan
- Affiliations: Mississippi High School Activities Association
- Website: rhs.madison-schools.com

Ridgeland High School is a suburban public high school located in Ridgeland, Mississippi, United States.

In addition to the city of Ridgeland, it serves the Madison County portion of Jackson, which includes the faculty housing for Tougaloo College.

== Notable alumni ==
- Yam Banks, American football player
- Bianca Knight, Olympic track and field athlete
- Erin Morton, Broadway actress
