= Xavian Stapleton =

American basketball player (born 1996)

Personal information
- Born: January 24, 1996 (age 30) Flora, Mississippi, US
- Listed height: 6 ft 7 in (2.01 m)
- Listed weight: 203 lb (92 kg)

Career information
- High school: Madison Central (Madison, Mississippi)
- College: Louisiana Tech (2014–2015); Mississippi State (2015–2018); Florida Atlantic (2018–2019)
- Position: Shooting guard / forward
- Number: 11, 3, 4

Career highlights
- Conference USA Co-Sixth Man of the Year (2019)

Xavian Jarquay Stapleton (born January 24, 1996) is an American former basketball player. He played college basketball for the Louisiana Tech Bulldogs, Mississippi State Bulldogs, and Florida Atlantic Owls.

Stapleton was born in Flora, Mississippi, and played high school basketball at Madison Central High School in Madison, Mississippi. He earned first-team all-state accolades as a senior after averaging over 20 points per game, but was lightly recruited by NCAA Division I programs and ultimately committed to Louisiana Tech in November 2013. As a freshman at Louisiana Tech in 2014–2015, Stapleton emerged as the team's sixth man. He then transferred to Mississippi State, where he played two seasons in a reserve role while battling knee injuries. In 2018, Stapleton transferred again to Florida Atlantic as a graduate student. He was named the Conference USA Co-Sixth Man of the Year in his lone season with the Owls.

== Early life and high school ==
Xavian Jarquay Stapleton was born on January 24, 1996, in Flora, Mississippi, to Yulanda and Kevon Davis. He attended Madison Central High School in Madison, Mississippi, where he played basketball under head coach Rahim Lockhart. As a junior, Stapleton averaged 12.2 points, 4.4 rebounds, and 1.2 assists per game, earning third-team All-Metro honors from The Clarion-Ledger. He helped the Jaguars to a 25–9 record and an appearance in the Class 6A state championship game, where he scored 12 points in a 56–48 loss to Murrah.

[Stapleton is] one of those rare exceptions where the best athlete in the state decided to stick with basketball.

— Madison Central head coach Rahim Lockhart (2013)

As a senior, Stapleton averaged 20.9 points and 8.8 rebounds per game, garnering first-team all-state honors and a spot in The Clarion-Ledger's Dandy Dozen, which recognized the 12 best high school players in Mississippi. He was also rated the second-best player in the state by Mississippi Hoop Report. Stapleton led Madison Central to a 28–4 record and a state semifinals appearance, scoring a team-high 16 points in a 44–40 loss to eventual state champion Gulfport. He was invited to play in the Mississippi-Alabama All-Star Classic, where he teamed up with Devin Booker on the Mississippi All-Stars. Stapleton notched 11 points and a team-high eight rebounds in a 90–83 loss to the Alabama All-Stars. He also played on the Amateur Athletic Union circuit for the Jackson Tigers. Stapleton was named by future NBA player Quinndary Weatherspoon as the toughest opponent he faced in high school.

Stapleton was only lightly recruited by NCAA Division I programs and unranked by major recruiting services. He committed to playing college basketball for Louisiana Tech, signing his National Letter of Intent on November 13, 2013 – the first day recruits could sign with schools.

== College career ==
=== Louisiana Tech ===
As a freshman in 2014–15, Stapleton played in all 36 games, making one start, averaging 6.7 points and 2.1 rebounds per game while shooting 41.3 percent from the field. He also ranked second on the team with 23 blocks and was described by The Clarion-Ledger as "the Bulldogs' top threat coming off the bench". On December 18, 2014, Stapleton scored a season-high 18 points, including five three-pointers, in just 12 minutes during a 79–54 victory over Nicholls State, with head coach Mike White saying he made "a pretty good argument for more playing time" with his performance. He earned Conference USA Freshman of the Week honors the following month after posting 16 points and 17 points in wins over Southern Arkansas and Southern Miss, respectively. On February 7, 2015, Stapleton led his team with 18 points – matching his season-high – along with four steals in a 73–62 victory over Middle Tennessee. He earned his first career start in Louisiana Tech's next game against Florida Atlantic. In the regular season finale, a 72–61 win over Southern Miss on March 5, Stapleton scored what was described by The News-Star as a "thunderous" one-handed alley-oop dunk off a pass from Raheem Appleby. It was chosen as the top play of the day by both ESPN and Fox Sports. The Bulldogs won their first outright conference regular-season title since 1999 and were invited to the National Invitation Tournament (NIT), where they lost in the quarterfinals to Temple.

After his freshman season, Stapleton requested his release from his scholarship, citing personal issues and instability within the program following Coach White's departure as reasons for his decision. His release was granted on June 17, albeit with restrictions on transferring to 55 NCAA Division I schools: all Conference USA members, all 2015–16 basketball opponents, and all schools located in Louisiana, Texas, Mississippi, and Arkansas, as well as the University of Florida, where White had been hired. Stapleton was reportedly "agitated" by the restrictions and contacted The Clarion-Ledger, who first reported the news on June 22. The restrictions received national attention from outlets like NBC Sports and SB Nation for their perceived heavy-handedness. Louisiana Tech athletic director Tommy McClelland explained that it was in line with historical precedent when an athlete requests a general release rather than specifying specific schools they are interested in. On June 26, Stapleton, through an attorney, provided Louisiana Tech with said list of schools, and they responded three days later by lifting the restriction on schools in Arkansas, Mississippi, and Texas.

Stapleton later spoke about the ordeal in 2019, saying: "I had the opportunity to go to a high major, so that's what I did. It wasn't something that Louisiana Tech did... it just was a matter of me making that decision for myself." On another occasion, also that year, after beating the Bulldogs in a game, he said: "I don't regret nothing I went through. I had a great time at Louisiana Tech... It was another bump in the road we had to get over."

=== Mississippi State ===
==== Injuries and 2016–17 season ====
On July 5, 2015, Stapleton announced his commitment to transfer to Mississippi State University (MSU). He had also taken visits to Alabama and Iowa State, but chose to play for the Mississippi State Bulldogs of the Southeastern Conference (SEC) under head coach Ben Howland. "It's close to home and I'm a Mississippi guy," explained Stapleton. "It just feels so good. It felt like the right thing to do." He was awarded the program's last scholarship for the 2015–16 season, which had become available the previous month after the departure of another player, but was forced to sit out for a year due to NCAA transfer rules. Stapleton tore his anterior cruciate ligament (ACL) and meniscus in his left knee during a pickup game in August and had to undergo surgery the following month. He tore the same ACL in March 2016, requiring another surgery to repair the damage.

In the 2016–17 preseason, Stapleton won the dunk contest at MSU's Maroon Night at the Humphrey Coliseum with a between-the-legs slam while wearing a knee brace, claiming he felt 95 percent healthy. He missed the first nine games of the season while he continued his recovery, and made his team debut on December 22, 2016, scoring eight points in 11 minutes in an 86–44 blowout win over Southern Miss at the Mississippi Coliseum in Jackson, Mississippi. On February 4, 2017, Stapleton registered his first career double-double, recording 14 points and 11 rebounds along with four steals in a 64–59 victory over Tennessee. In the regular season finale, he matched his season-high with 14 points in an 88–76 win over LSU. Four days later, in the first round of the SEC tournament, Stapleton tallied 13 points, six rebounds, "and a couple of highlight-reel dunks" in a 79–52 win, also over LSU. The Bulldogs were defeated in the next round, 75–55, by Alabama. Stapleton finished the season averaging 7.1 points and 2.9 rebounds in 23 games played with five starts.

==== 2017–18 season ====
Stapleton sprained his knee five minutes into the 2017–18 season opener against Alabama State, reaggravating the same injury from previous years. He was sidelined for just over two weeks, after which he returned to a bench role. On December 23, 2017, Stapleton scored a team-high 12 points with four three-pointers, including two crucial threes late in the second half, in a 70–64 win over Southern Miss at the Mississippi Coliseum. In his next game a week later, he put up 16 points – including 12 in the second half – in a 109–81 win over North Florida to close non-conference play. On February 14, 2018, Stapleton had a season-high 18 points while shooting five-of-five from three-point range in an 81–80 loss to Vanderbilt. For the first time since the season opener, he was moved into the starting lineup for the SEC tournament in place of Aric Holman. After losing in the quarterfinals, the Bulldogs were awarded a bid to the 2018 NIT, their first postseason appearance since 2012.

Stapleton continued in his starting role throughout the NIT. In the first round, he recorded 12 points and five rebounds in a 66–59 win over Nebraska. Stapleton scored 15 points – all in the first half – in a 78–77 second-round win over Baylor. He tallied 12 points and five rebounds in a 79–56 rout of Louisville in the quarterfinals, which was MSU's first win over Louisville since the 1978–79 season. However, Stapleton struggled in their semifinal game at Madison Square Garden, going scoreless in a 75–60 defeat to Penn State which ended their season. He played in 32 games, making seven starts, averaging 6.4 points and 2.6 rebounds per game. On April 18, 2018, Stapleton announced that he would be leaving MSU with the intention of playing elsewhere as a graduate transfer after earning his degree in May.

=== Florida Atlantic ===
On June 29, 2018, it was announced that Stapleton would transfer to Florida Atlantic University (FAU) to play for the Florida Atlantic Owls. His decision was influenced by his relationship with head coach Dusty May, whom he previously played for as a freshman at Louisiana Tech. "I know what Coach May expects of me and his players," said Stapleton. "It was an easy decision to come here." He was tapped for a key role on a revamped roster in 2018–19. On November 11, 2018, Stapleton posted 14 points and a season-high 10 rebounds in an 80–79 win over UCF. On November 25, he scored a career-high 27 points with six three-pointers and grabbed seven rebounds in an 85–68 victory over Florida Gulf Coast on November 25. However, his lingering knee issues sidelined him for six weeks and he lost his starting spot in the lineup.

On January 10, 2019, Stapleton had a game-high 23 points in an 80–73 loss to Old Dominion. On January 26, he recorded 20 points on eight-of-10 shooting in an 89–72 win over FIU. Stapleton tallied 19 points and nine rebounds in his next game, a 69–61 victory over Louisiana Tech on January 31, followed by an 18-point performance in a 74–72 defeat to Southern Miss two days later. On March 6, he made his first start since November in FAU's senior night, where the Owls faced his former team, Louisiana Tech; Stapleton posted 16 points and seven rebounds in a 72–69 defeat. He was named the Conference USA Co-Sixth Man of the Year (along with LaDavius Draine of Southern Miss) at the conclusion of the regular season, becoming the first Owl to win an individual award since Brett Royster in 2011.

In the first round of the Conference USA tournament, Stapleton contributed a game-high 17 points – including 14 in the first half – and five rebounds in a 57–56 loss to Louisiana Tech. FAU earned a berth to the 2019 CollegeInsider.com Postseason Tournament, where, in his final collegiate game, Stapleton scored 14 points and grabbed five rebounds in a 68–66 first-round loss to Charleston Southern. He finished the year with eight straight double-digit scoring games, ranking second on the team with 21 such games. Stapleton made 26 appearances on the season with eight starts, averaging a career-best 13.3 points and 4.7 rebounds per game.

== Player profile ==
Stapleton stood 6 ft 6 in (1.98 m) tall by his senior year of high school, with his coach, Rahim Lockhart, calling him a "big 2 guard". Upon his commitment to Louisiana Tech, he received praise from head coach Mike White: "Xavian is very versatile and very athletic. He can score it, rebound it, and he'll remind you a little of Jaron [Johnson] – a wing with size with the ability to do a lot of good things."

One thing with Xavian Stapleton you have to know, he's not backing down from anything. He's tough. He's going to give it his all, and he's going to go 110 percent every time he's out there. With him coming back, we feel like we are way better now.

— Mississippi State teammate Lamar Peters following Stapleton's return from injury

In college, Stapleton played the stretch four role. Will Sammon of The Clarion-Ledger wrote that, at his size, he was "more of a true shooting guard", while Brett Hudson of The Commercial Dispatch opined that his size "may be best suited for small forward, but his ability to defend and stretch opposing defenses as a power forward made him a pivotal weapon." Despite being shorter than most power forwards, Stapleton showed the physicality to play the position and was a career 33.5 percent three-point shooter in college, creating a "matchup problem" for opposing teams. He was noted for his athleticism, which he often used to perform flashy slam dunks, as well as the emotion he played with on the court. Defensively, Sammon wrote that his "ability to switch and communicate on defense was an underrated aspect of his game".

At his best, Stapleton is the in-your-face guy that you hate to play against, but welcome with open arms if he's on your team. That's because he's also the same guy working on his shot in an empty gym after games...

— Will Sammon of The Clarion-Ledger (January 2018)

== Legal issues ==
On August 1, 2015, shortly after transferring to Mississippi State, Stapleton was mistakenly arrested in Starkville, Mississippi, for driving with a suspended license due to a clerical error. On January 9, 2018, he turned himself in to the Oktibbeha County Sheriff's Office after a warrant was issued for his arrest for disturbing the peace; he was later released on a $500 bond. On May 29, 2025, Stapleton was arrested in Sweetwater, Florida, for allegedly operating an illegal gambling scheme. He and two other men were reportedly observed running a shell game at the Dolphin Mall.
