= Kearney Park, Mississippi =

- Census-designated place
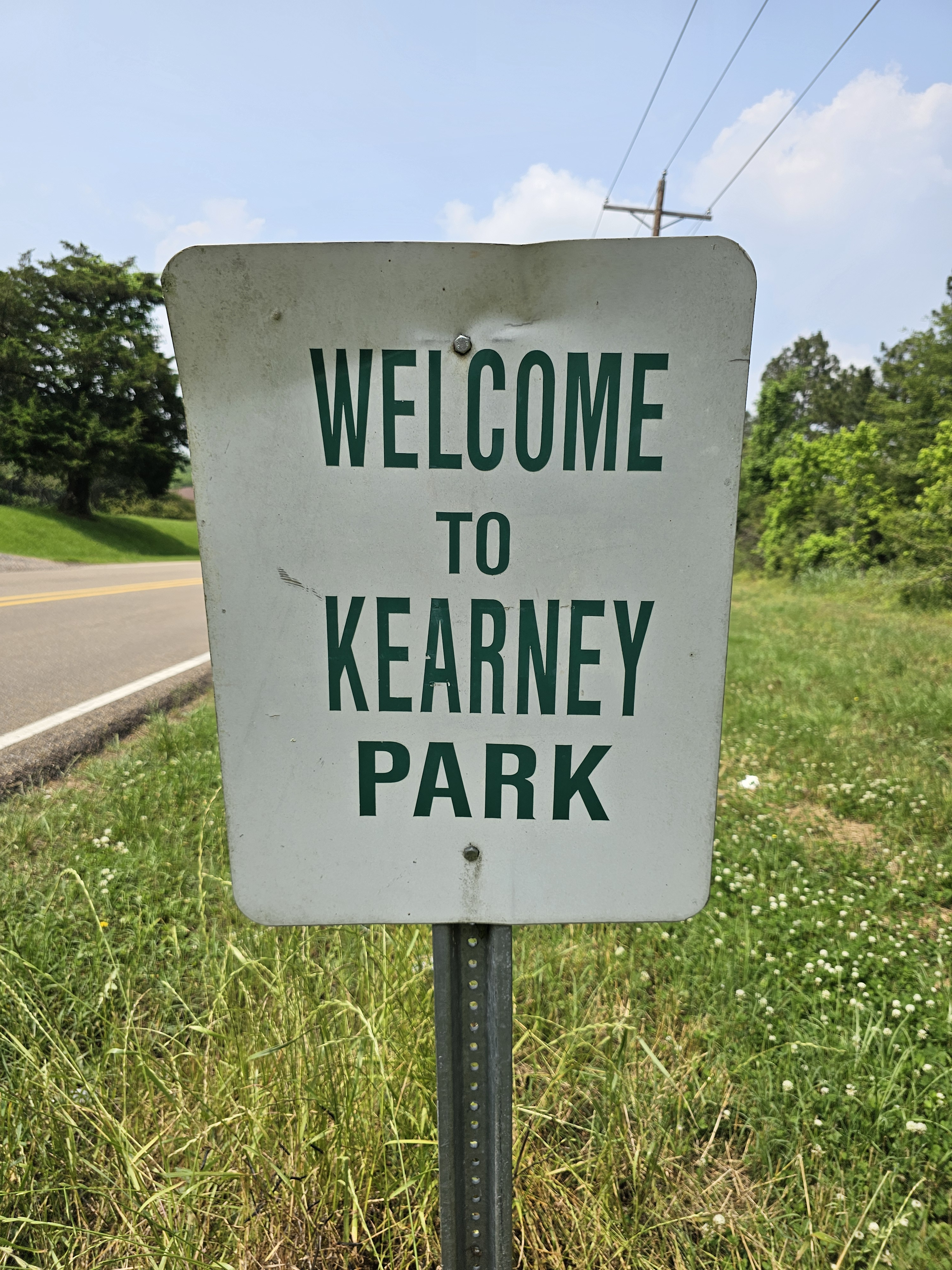
- Kearney Park's welcome sign on Kearney Park Road

- Location within Mississippi Location within the United States
- Coordinates: 32°35′23″N 90°18′57″W
- Country: United States
- State: Mississippi
- County: Madison

Area
  - Total: 2.75 sq mi (7.11 km^{2})
  - Land: 2.69 sq mi (6.96 km^{2})
  - Water: 0.062 sq mi (0.16 km^{2})
- Elevation: 210 ft (64 m)

Population (2020)
  - Total: 1,048
  - Density: 390.2/sq mi (150.64/km^{2})
- Time zone: UTC-6 (Central (CST))
  - Summer (DST): UTC-5 (CDT)
- ZIP code: 39071 (Flora)
- Area code: 662
- GNIS feature ID: 2586600
- FIPS Code: 28-37190

Kearney Park is an unincorporated community and census-designated place (CDP) located on Livingston-Vernon Road in western Madison County, Mississippi, United States. As of the 2020 census, the population was 1,048. Kearney Park is part of the Jackson Metropolitan Statistical Area.

== Geography ==
Kearney Park is approximately 3 miles (5 km) north of the center of Flora (traveling Kearney Park Road), 5 miles (8 km) southeast of Bentonia, and 19 miles (31 km) west of Canton, the Madison county seat.

According to the U.S. Census Bureau, the Kearney Park CDP has a total area of 2.7 square miles (7.0 km^{2}), of which 0.06 square miles (0.16 km^{2}), or 2.18%, are water. The community sits 1.5 miles (2.4 km) southeast of the Big Black River, a tributary of the Mississippi.

== Demographics ==
Historical population
Census	Pop.	Note	%±
2010	1,054		—
2020	1,048		−0.6%
U.S. Decennial Census

Kearney Park first appeared as a census designated place in the 2010 U.S. census.

=== Racial and ethnic composition ===
Kearney Park CDP, Mississippi – Racial and ethnic composition Note: the US Census treats Hispanic/Latino as an ethnic category. This table excludes Latinos from the racial categories and assigns them to a separate category. Hispanics/Latinos may be of any race.
Race / Ethnicity (NH = Non-Hispanic)	Pop 2010	Pop 2020	% 2010	% 2020
White alone (NH)	155	152	14.71%	14.50%
Black or African American alone (NH)	889	863	84.35%	82.35%
Native American or Alaska Native alone (NH)	1	2	0.09%	0.19%
Asian alone (NH)	0	1	0.00%	0.10%
Native Hawaiian or Pacific Islander alone (NH)	0	0	0.00%	0.00%
Other race alone (NH)	0	0	0.00%	0.00%
Mixed race or Multiracial (NH)	3	22	0.28%	2.10%
Hispanic or Latino (any race)	6	8	0.57%	0.76%
Total	1,054	1,048	100.00%	100.00%

== Transportation ==
Amtrak’s City of New Orleans, which operates between New Orleans and Chicago, passes through the town on CN tracks, but makes no stop. The nearest station is located in Jackson, 24 miles (39 km) to the south.

== Education ==
Madison County School District is the local school district.

It is zoned to East Flora Elementary. Residents are in turn zoned to Madison Middle School, Rosa Scott 9th Grade, and Madison Central High School.
