= Quinndary Weatherspoon =

American basketball player (born 1996)

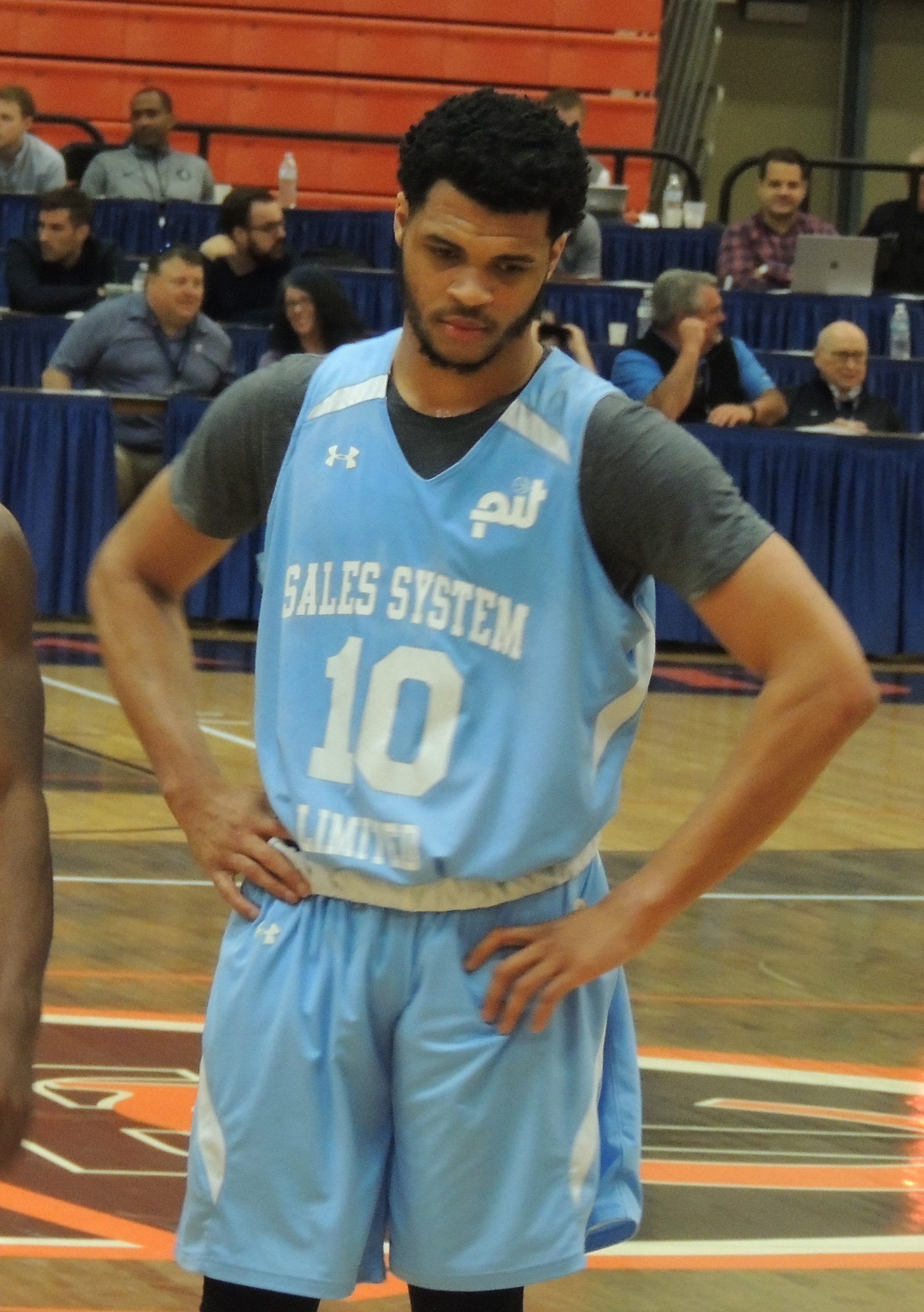
- Weatherspoon at the 2019 Portsmouth Invitational Tournament

No. 4 – Qingdao Eagles
- Position: Shooting guard
- League: CBA

Personal information
- Born: September 10, 1996 (age 30) Canton, Mississippi, U.S.
- Listed height: 6 ft 3 in (1.91 m)
- Listed weight: 205 lb (93 kg)

Career information
- High school: Velma Jackson (Camden, Mississippi)
- College: Mississippi State (2015–2019)
- NBA draft: 2019: 2nd round, 49th overall pick
- Drafted by: San Antonio Spurs
- Playing career: 2019–present

Career history
- 2019–2021: San Antonio Spurs
- 2019–2021: →Austin Spurs
- 2021: Santa Cruz Warriors
- 2021–2022: Golden State Warriors
- 2021–2022: →Santa Cruz Warriors
- 2022–2023: Tianjin Pioneers
- 2023–2024: South Bay Lakers
- 2024: Zhejiang Lions
- 2024: Gigantes de Carolina
- 2024–2025: Qingdao Eagles
- 2025: Brampton Honey Badgers
- 2025–present: Qingdao Eagles

Career highlights
- NBA champion (2022); NBA G League Next Up Game (2024); First-team All-SEC (2019); 2× Second-team All-SEC (2017, 2018); SEC All-Freshman Team (2016); 2× Howell Trophy (2018, 2019)
- Stats at NBA.com
- Stats at Basketball Reference

Quinndary Vonta Weatherspoon (born September 10, 1996) is an American professional basketball player for the Qingdao Eagles of the Chinese Basketball Association (CBA). He played four seasons of college basketball for the Mississippi State Bulldogs. Weatherspoon was selected 49th overall by the San Antonio Spurs in the 2019 NBA draft. After two seasons with the team, he joined the Golden State Warriors in 2021. During his first season with the Warriors, he won an NBA championship.

== Early life ==
Born in Canton, Mississippi, Weatherspoon is the son of Sharon and Tommie Weatherspoon and has two younger brothers, Nick and Brandon, who are also basketball players. He began playing basketball in middle school. He starred at Velma Jackson High School, where he was coached by Anthony Carlyle. Velma Jackson won three straight state titles in 2012, 2013 and 2014. Towards the end of his high school career, he was considered a three-star recruit, ranked no. 116 in his class by Rivals.com and later committed to Mississippi State under Ben Howland.

== College career ==
Weatherspoon was named to the SEC All-Freshman Team. He averaged 12.0 points and 4.7 rebounds per game playing alongside Malik Newman.

He injured his wrist against Boise State on November 21, 2016, and was initially ruled out for the season. After missing several games, Weatherspoon came back. As a sophomore, Weatherspoon averaged 16.5 points and 5.1 rebounds per game. Weatherspoon was named to the Second Team All-SEC as a sophomore.

As a junior, Weatherspoon averaged 14.4 points, 6.0 rebounds and 3.3 assists per game and started every game. He earned the Howell Trophy as the best player in Mississippi. Weatherspoon was named second-team All-SEC. On April 6, 2018, Weatherspoon joined his brother Nick Weatherspoon and Lamar Peters among Mississippi State players to declare for the 2018 NBA draft. He later opted to withdraw from the draft and return to Mississippi State.

In his senior season, Weatherspoon was named first-team All-SEC. He became the program's third player to score 2,000 career points on March 22, 2019, in an upset loss to Liberty on the 2019 NCAA tournament.

== Professional career ==
=== San Antonio Spurs (2019–2021) ===
On June 20, 2019, Weatherspoon was selected with the 49th overall pick by the San Antonio Spurs in the 2019 NBA draft. Weatherspoon was later listed in the roster of Spurs for the 2019 NBA Summer League hosted at Vivint Arena.

On July 8, 2019, Weatherspoon signed a two-way contract with the Spurs. He had a career-high 30 points for the Austin Spurs in a 126–123 overtime win over the Greensboro Swarm on January 4, 2020. On February 8, 2020, Weatherspoon had his debut in the NBA, coming off from bench in a 102–122 loss to the Sacramento Kings.

On November 24, 2020, the Spurs announced that they had re-signed Weatherspoon to another two-way contract.

=== Santa Cruz Warriors (2021) ===
Weatherspoon joined the Brooklyn Nets for the 2021 NBA Summer League.

On October 11, 2021, the Golden State Warriors signed Weatherspoon, but waived him two days later. In October 2021, Weatherspoon joined the Santa Cruz Warriors as an affiliate player where in nine games, he averaged 16.1 points, 4.3 rebounds, 3.7 assists and 1.22 steals in 27.4 minutes per contest.

=== Golden State Warriors (2021–2022) ===
On December 23, 2021, Weatherspoon signed a 10-day contract with the Golden State Warriors. On January 3, 2022, he signed a two-way contract with the Warriors eventually winning a title.

On July 22, 2022, Weatherspoon signed another two-way contract with Golden State, but was waived on October 13.

=== Tianjin Pioneers (2022–2023) ===
In December 2022, Weatherspoon signed with the Tianjin Pioneers of the Chinese Basketball Association.

=== South Bay Lakers (2023–2024) ===
On October 19, 2023, Weatherspoon signed with the Los Angeles Lakers, but was waived the next day. On October 28, he joined the South Bay Lakers, playing until February 26, 2024, when he was waived.

=== Zhejiang Lions (2024) ===
On March 2, 2024, Weatherspoon signed with the Zhejiang Lions of the Chinese Basketball Association.

On June 13, 2024, Weatherspoon was drafted by the Valley Suns in the 2024 NBA G League expansion draft.

=== Gigantes de Carolina (2024) ===
In June, 2024, Weatherspoon signed with the Gigantes de Carolina of the Baloncesto Superior Nacional (BSN) for 2024 season.

On August 18, 2024, Weatherspoon signed with the Avtodor of the VTB United League for 2024–25 season. On September 8, 2024, Avtodor announced that he missed several flights to arrive at Russia and stopped communicating with the team.

=== Qingdao Eagles (2024–2025) ===
On October 8, 2024, Weatherspoon signed with Qingdao Eagles of the Chinese Basketball Association.

=== Brampton Honey Badgers (2025) ===
On May 6, 2025, Weatherspoon signed with the Brampton Honey Badgers of the Canadian Elite Basketball League.

== Career statistics ==
Legend
GP	Games played	GS	Games started	MPG	Minutes per game
FG%	Field goal percentage	3P%	3-point field goal percentage	FT%	Free throw percentage
RPG	Rebounds per game	APG	Assists per game	SPG	Steals per game
BPG	Blocks per game	PPG	Points per game	**Bold**	Career high
†	Won an NBA championship

=== NBA ===
Year	Team	GP	GS	MPG	FG%	3P%	FT%	RPG	APG	SPG	BPG	PPG
2019–20	San Antonio	11	0	**7.1**	.294	**.200**	.500	.6	**1.0**	.3	**.1**	1.1
2020–21	San Antonio	**20**	0	6.1	.457	.167	.813	.6	.4	**.4**	**.1**	2.3
2021–22†	Golden State	11	0	6.6	**.571**	**.200**	**1.000**	**1.3**	.5	.1	**.1**	**2.7**
Career		42	0	6.5	.452	.188	.826	.8	.6	.3	.1	2.1

=== College ===
Year	Team	GP	GS	MPG	FG%	3P%	FT%	RPG	APG	SPG	BPG	PPG
2015–16	Mississippi State	31	17	27.0	.448	.394	.805	4.7	1.4	1.4	**.5**	12.0
2016–17	Mississippi State	29	29	31.9	.469	.373	.766	5.1	1.8	**1.7**	.3	16.5
2017–18	Mississippi State	**37**	**37**	31.4	.484	.313	.771	**6.0**	**3.3**	1.4	.3	14.4
2018–19	Mississippi State	34	34	**34.0**	**.508**	**.396**	**.809**	4.7	2.8	**1.7**	.3	**18.5**
Career		131	117	31.2	.480	.368	.788	5.2	2.4	1.5	.4	15.4

== Personal life ==
Weatherspoon majored in interdisciplinary studies during college. He is the son of Sharon and Tommie Weatherspoon and has a brother named Nick, who also played college basketball at Mississippi State, and a brother named Brandon, who played college basketball at Florida Atlantic and recently played for Hebraica Macabi.
