= List of Los Angeles Angels first-round draft picks =

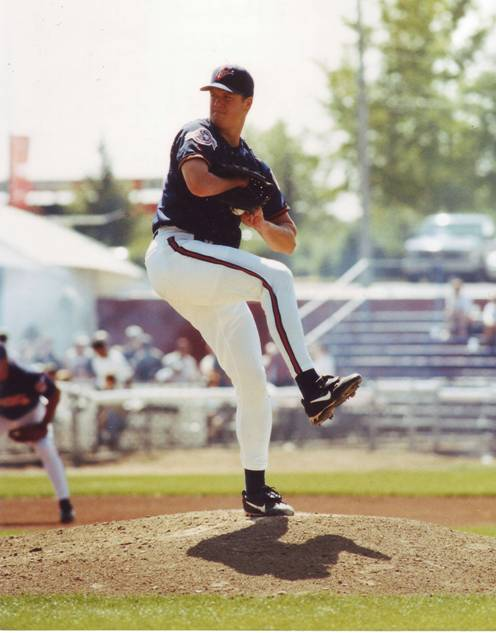
Jim Abbott (1988), born without a right hand, won the 1987 Golden Spikes Award, the 1992 Tony Conigliaro Award, and the 1995 Hutch Award.

The Los Angeles Angels are a Major League Baseball (MLB) franchise based in Anaheim, California. They play in the American League (AL) West division. Since the institution of Major League Baseball's Rule 4 Draft in 1965, the Angels have selected 62 players in the first round. Officially known as the "First-Year Player Draft", the Rule 4 Draft is Major League Baseball's primary mechanism for assigning amateur players from high schools, colleges, and other amateur clubs to its teams. The draft order is determined based on the previous season's standings, with the team possessing the worst record receiving the first pick. In addition, teams which lost free agents in the previous off-season may be awarded compensatory or supplementary picks.

Of the 66 players drafted by the Angels, 29 have been pitchers, the most of any position; 18 of these were right-handed, while 11 were left-handed. Fourteen outfielders, eight shortstops, four third basemen, and four first basemen were also taken. No second basemen have been selected. Thirteen of the players came from high schools or universities in the state of California, while Florida follows with six players. Four players have been selected from both Illinois and Georgia. All players selected have been from the United States. The franchise has made five selections in the same draft three times, in 1986, 2009, and 2010.

Two Angels first-round picks, outfielder Darin Erstad (1995) and third basemen Troy Glaus (1997), played with the 2002 World Series championship team. Outfielder Mike Trout, who was chosen in 2009 and has spent his entire MLB career to date with the Angels, was named AL Rookie of the Year in 2012, and finished no worse than second in voting for AL Most Valuable Player in each of his first five full seasons with the Angels, winning that award in 2014 and 2016. Pitcher Jim Abbott (1988), born without a right hand, won the 1987 Golden Spikes Award while playing at the University of Michigan, and the 1992 Tony Conigliaro Award and the 1995 Hutch Award while with the Angels. Danny Goodwin (1975), who was picked first overall in 1971 by the Chicago White Sox but opted for four years of college, is the only player to be selected first in the draft on two separate occasions.

The team has made 13 selections in the supplemental round of the draft and 21 compensatory picks since the institution of the First-Year Player Draft in 1965. These additional picks are provided when a team loses a particularly valuable free agent in the prior off-season,^{[V]} or, more recently, if a team fails to sign a draft pick from the previous year. The Angels have failed to sign one of their first-round picks, Alan Bannister (1969), but received no compensation. The franchise has made the first overall selection twice, in 1975 and 1995.

== Key ==
Year	Links to an article about that year's Major League Baseball draft
Position	Indicates the secondary/collegiate position at which the player was drafted, rather than the professional position the player may have gone on to play
Pick	Indicates the overall number of the pick
*	Player did not sign with the Angels
§	Indicates a supplemental pick
'02	Player was a member of Angels' 2002 championship team

== Selections ==
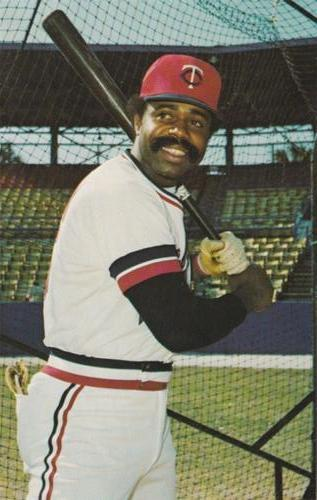
Danny Goodwin (1975) was the first player selected first overall in two separate drafts.

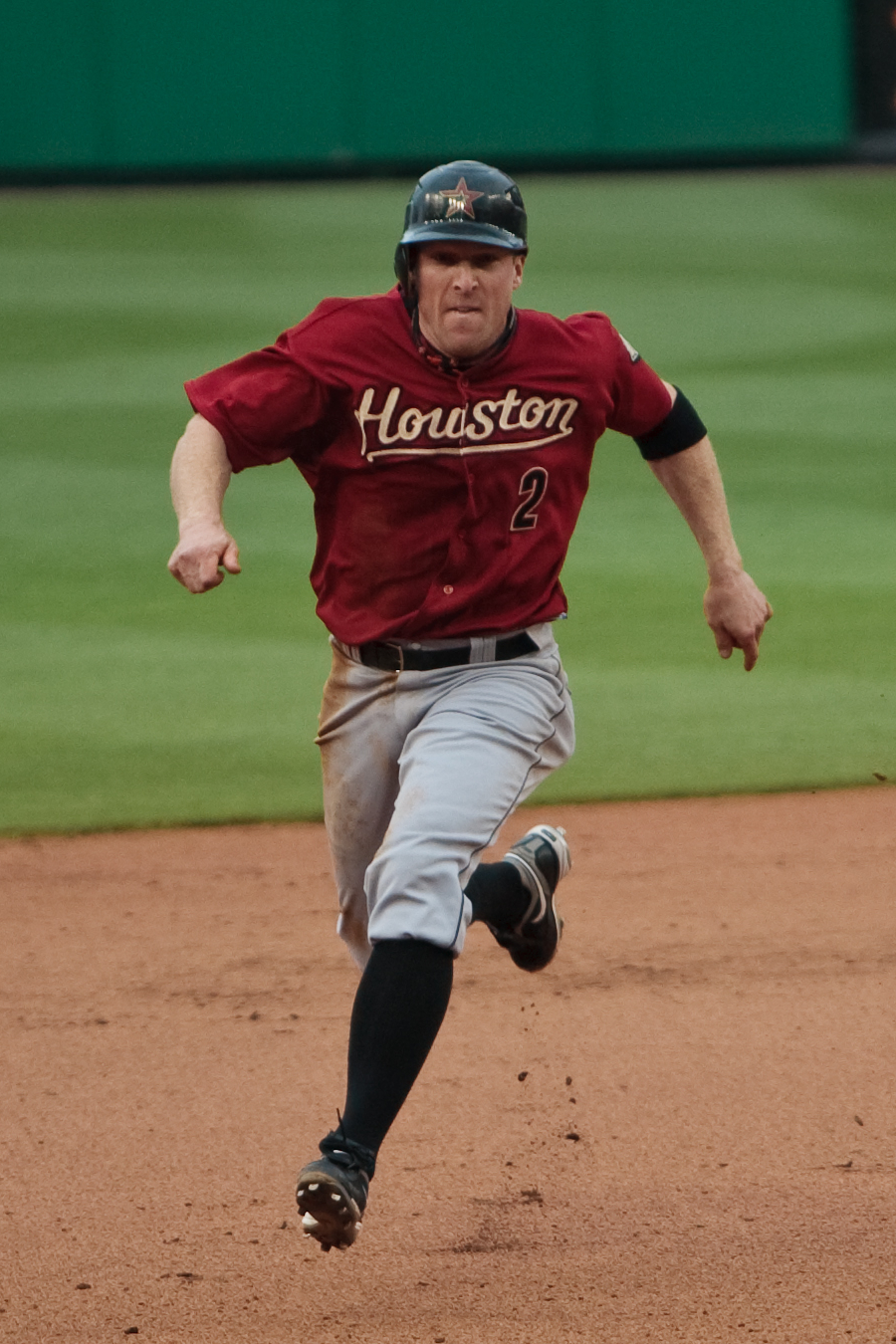
Darin Erstad was selected first overall in 1995.

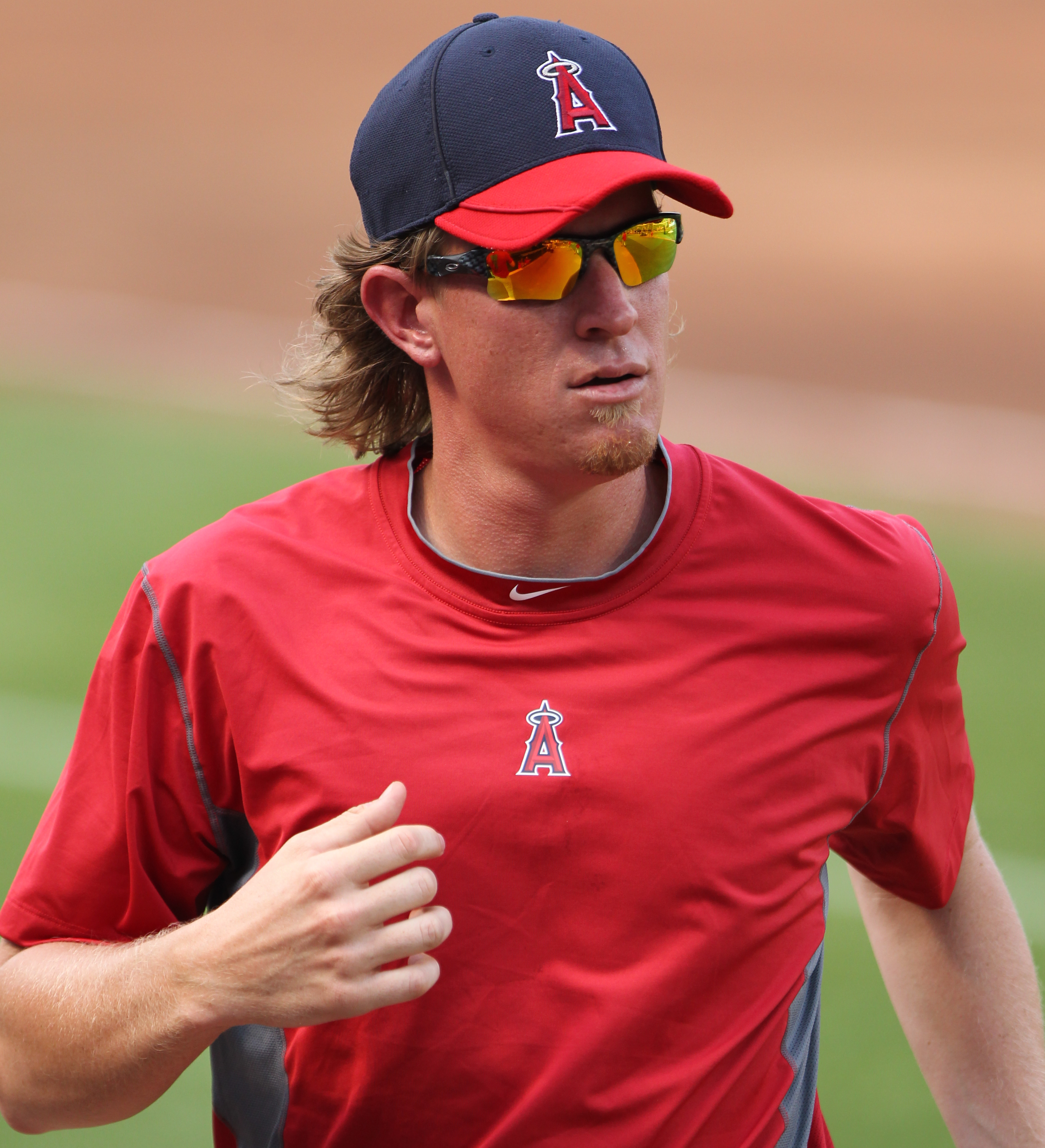
Jered Weaver (2004) was drafted twelfth overall by the Angels after winning the Roger Clemens, Dick Howser, Golden Spikes, and Baseball America High School Player of the Year awards.

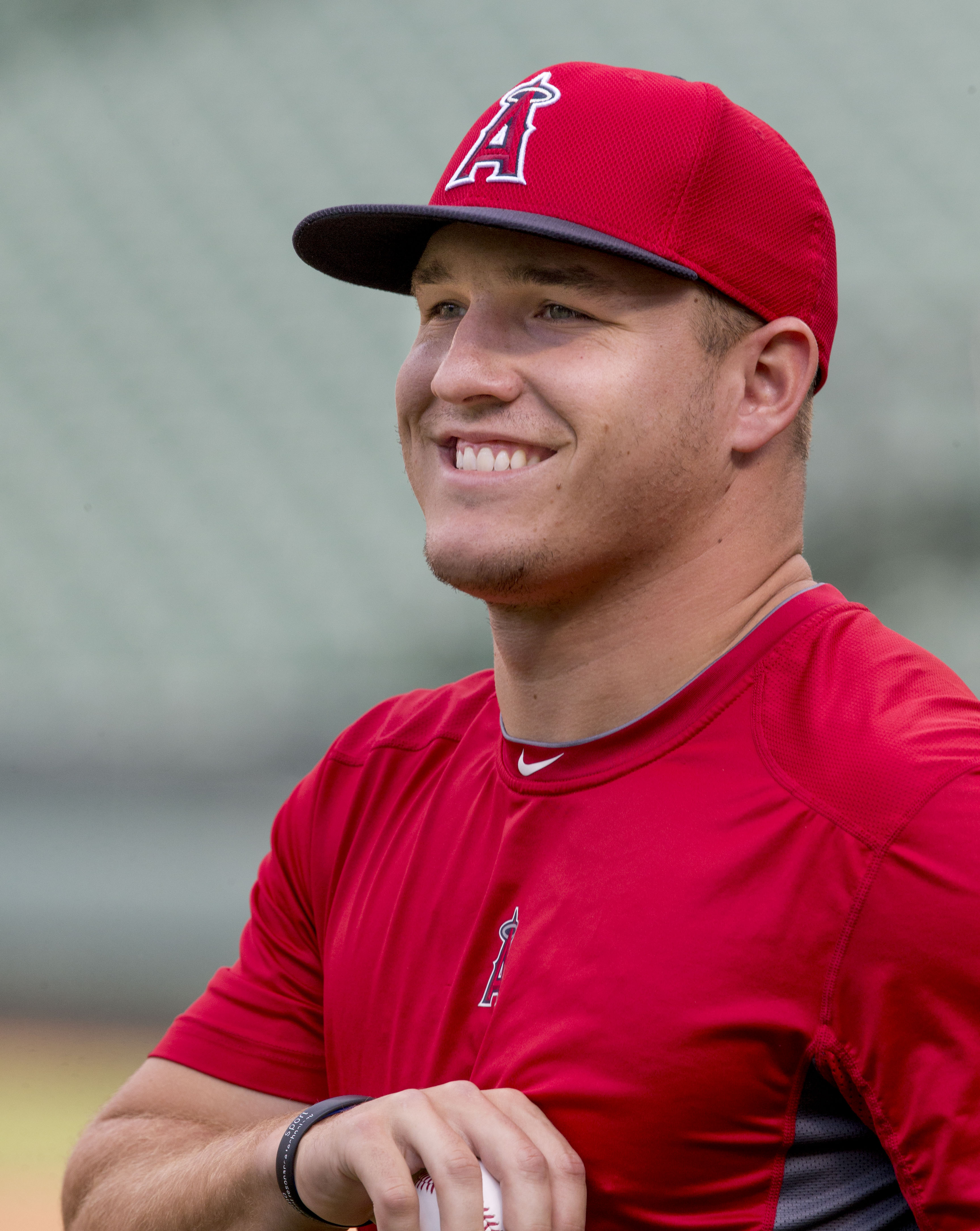
The Angeles selected Randal Grichuk and Mike Trout (pictured) with consecutive selections in 2009.

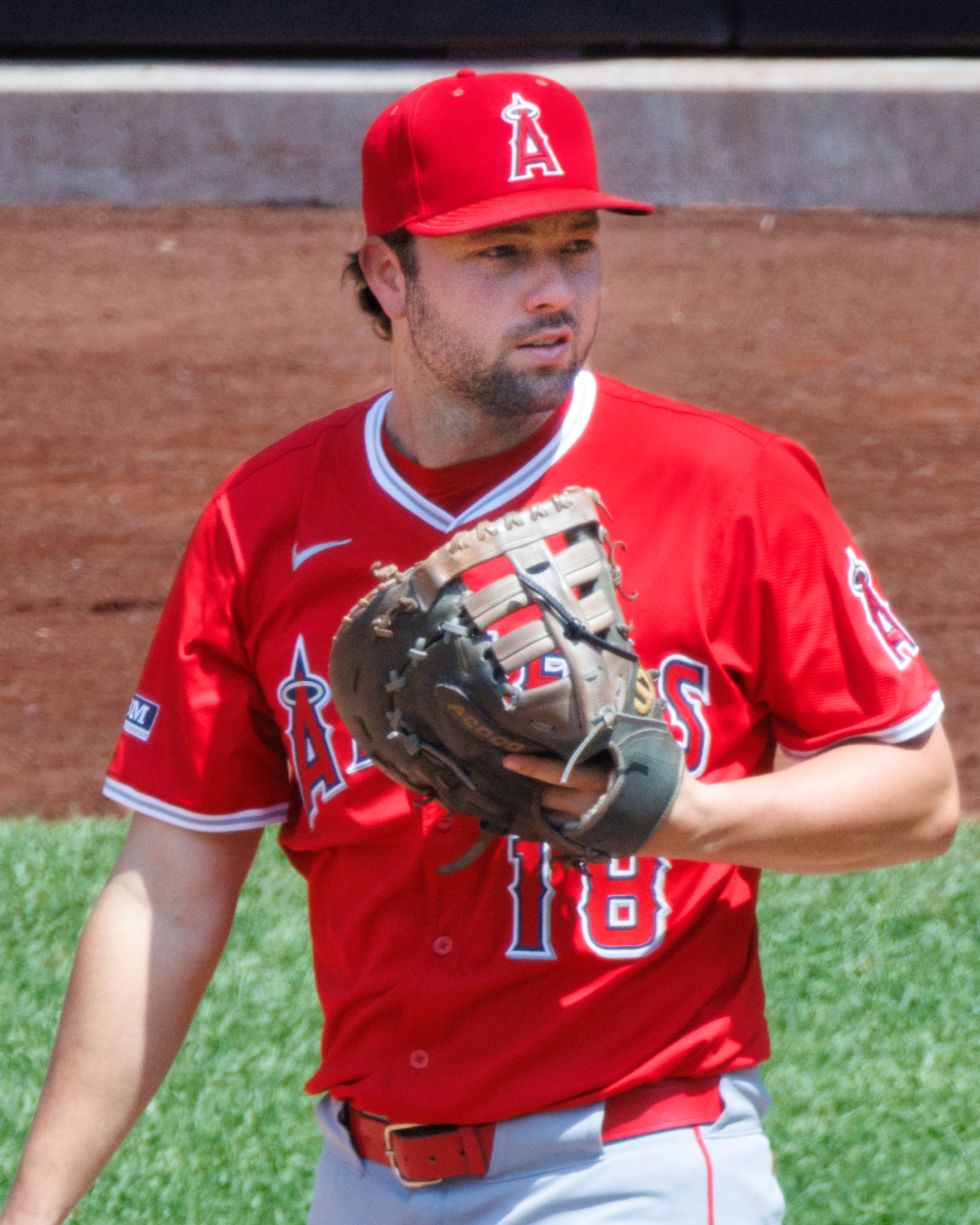
Nolan Schanuel (2023) was the first player from his draft class to reach the major leagues.

Year	Name	Position	School (Location)	Pick	Ref
1965	Jim Spencer	First baseman	Andover High School (Glen Burnie, Maryland)	11	
1966	Jim DeNeff	Shortstop	Indiana University Bloomington (Bloomington, Indiana)	8	
1967	Mike Nunn	Catcher	Ben L. Smith High School (Greensboro, North Carolina)	9	
1968	Lloyd Allen	Right-handed pitcher	Selma High School (Selma, California)	12	
1969	Alan Bannister*	Shortstop	John F. Kennedy High School (La Palma, California)	5	
1970	Paul Dade	Third baseman	Nathan Hale High School (Seattle, Washington)	10	
1971	Frank Tanana	Left-handed pitcher	Catholic Central High School (Grand Rapids, Michigan)	13	
1972	Dave Chalk	Third baseman	University of Texas at Austin (Austin, Texas)	10	
1973	Billy Taylor	Outfielder	Windsor Forest High School (Savannah, Georgia)	7	
1974	Mike Miley	Shortstop	Louisiana State University (Baton Rouge, Louisiana)	10	
1975	Danny Goodwin	Catcher	Southern University (Baton Rouge, Louisiana)	1^{[a]}	
1976	Ken Landreaux	Outfielder	Arizona State University (Tempe, Arizona)	6	
1977	Richard Dotson	Right-handed pitcher	Anderson High School (Cincinnati, Ohio)	7	
1978	Tom Brunansky	Outfielder	West Covina High School (Covina, California)	14	
1979	no first-round pick^{[b]}				
1980	Dennis Rasmussen	Left-handed pitcher	Creighton University (Omaha, Nebraska)	17^{§}^{[c]}	
1981	Dick Schofield	Shortstop	Sacred Heart-Griffin High School (Springfield, Illinois)	3	
1982	Bob Kipper	Left-handed pitcher	Aurora Central Catholic High School (Aurora, Illinois)	8	
1983	Mark Doran	Outfielder	University of Wisconsin–Madison (Madison, Wisconsin)	23	
1984	Erik Pappas	Catcher	Mount Carmel High School (Chicago, Illinois)	6	
1985	Willie Fraser	Right-handed pitcher	Concordia College (Bronxville, New York)	15	
1985	Mike Cook	Right-handed pitcher	University of South Carolina (Columbia, South Carolina)	19^{[d]}	
1986	Roberto Hernández	Right-handed pitcher	University of South Carolina Aiken (Aiken, South Carolina)	16^{[e]}	
1986	Lee Stevens	Outfielder	Lawrence High School (Lawrence, Kansas)	22	
1986	Terry Carr	Outfielder	James M. Bennett High School (Salisbury, Maryland)	25^{[f]}	
1986	Mike Fetters	Right-handed pitcher	Pepperdine University (Malibu, California)	27^{§}^{[g]}	
1986	Daryl Green	Right-handed pitcher	Nacogdoches High School (Nacogdoches, Texas)	28^{§}^{[h]}	
1987	John Orton	Catcher	California Polytechnic State University (San Luis Obispo, California)	25	
1987	David Holdridge	Right-handed pitcher	Ocean View High School (Huntington Beach, California)	31^{§}^{[i]}	
1988	Jim Abbott	Left-handed pitcher	University of Michigan (Ann Arbor, Michigan)	8	
1989	Kyle Abbott	Left-handed pitcher	California State University, Long Beach (Long Beach, California)	9	
1990	no first-round pick^{[j]}				
1991	Eduardo Pérez	First baseman	Florida State University (Tallahassee, Florida)	17	
1991	Jorge Fábregas	Third baseman	University of Miami (Coral Gables, Florida)	34^{§}^{[k]}	
1992	Pete Janicki	Right-handed pitcher	University of California, Los Angeles (Los Angeles, California)	8	
1992	Jeff Schmidt	Right-handed pitcher	University of Minnesota (Minneapolis, Minnesota)	29^{§}^{[l]}	
1993	Brian Anderson	Left-handed pitcher	Wright State University (Fairborn, Ohio)	3	
1994	McKay Christensen	Outfielder	Clovis West High School (Fresno, California)	6	
1995	Darin Erstad^{'02}	Outfielder	University of Nebraska–Lincoln (Lincoln, Nebraska)	1	
1996	no first-round pick^{[m]}				
1997	Troy Glaus^{'02}	Third baseman	University of California, Los Angeles (Los Angeles, California)	3	
1998	Seth Etherton	Right-handed pitcher	University of Southern California (Los Angeles, California)	18	
1999	no first-round pick^{[n]}				
2000	Joe Torres	Left-handed pitcher	Gateway High School (Kissimmee, Florida)	10	
2000	Chris Bootcheck	Right-handed pitcher	Auburn University (Auburn, Alabama)	20^{[o]}	
2001	Casey Kotchman	First baseman	Seminole High School (Seminole, Florida)	13	
2001	Jeff Mathis	Third baseman	Marianna High School (Marianna, Florida)	33^{§}^{[p]}	
2002	Joe Saunders	Left-handed pitcher	Virginia Polytechnic Institute and State University (Blacksburg, Virginia)	12	
2003	Brandon Wood	Shortstop	Horizon High School (Scottsdale, Arizona)	23	
2004	Jered Weaver	Right-handed pitcher	California State University, Long Beach (Long Beach, California)	12	
2005	Trevor Bell	Right-handed pitcher	Crescenta Valley High School (La Crescenta-Montrose, California)	37^{§}^{[q]}	
2006	Hank Conger	Catcher	Huntington Beach High School (Huntington Beach, California)	25	
2007	Jonathan Bachanov	Right-handed pitcher	University High School (Orlando, Florida)	58^{§}^{[r]}	
2008	no first-round pick^{[s]}				
2009	Randal Grichuk	Outfielder	Lamar Consolidated High School (Rosenberg, Texas)	24^{[t]}	
2009	Mike Trout	Outfielder	Millville Senior High School (Millville, New Jersey)	25^{[u]}	
2009	Tyler Skaggs	Left-handed pitcher	Santa Monica High School (Santa Monica, California)	40^{§}^{[v]}	
2009	Garrett Richards	Right-handed pitcher	University of Oklahoma (Norman, Oklahoma)	42^{§}^{[v]}	
2009	Tyler Kehrer	Left-handed pitcher	Eastern Illinois University (Charleston, Illinois)	48^{§}^{[v]}	
2010	Kaleb Cowart	Right-handed pitcher	Cook County High School (Adel, Georgia)	18^{[w]}	
2010	Cam Bedrosian	Right-handed pitcher	East Coweta High School (Sharpsburg, Georgia)	29^{[x]}	
2010	Chevy Clarke	Outfielder	Marietta High School (Marietta, Georgia)	30	
2010	Taylor Lindsey	Shortstop	Desert Mountain High School (Scottsdale, Arizona)	37^{§}^{[y]}	
2010	Ryan Bolden	Outfielder	Madison Central High School (Madison, Mississippi)	40^{§}^{[y]}	
2011	C. J. Cron	First baseman	University of Utah (Salt Lake City, Utah)	17	
2012	no first-round pick^{[z]}				
2013	no first-round pick				
2014	Sean Newcomb	Left-handed pitcher	University of Hartford (West Hartford, Connecticut)	15	
2015	Taylor Ward	Catcher	California State University, Fresno (Fresno, California)	26	
2016	Matt Thaiss	Catcher	University of Virginia (Charlottesville, Virginia)	16	
2017	Jo Adell	Outfielder	Ballard High School (Louisville, Kentucky)	10	
2018	Jordyn Adams	Outfielder	Green Hope High School (Cary, North Carolina)	17	
2019	Will Wilson	Shortstop	NC State University (Raleigh, North Carolina)	15	
2020	Reid Detmers	Left-handed pitcher	University of Louisville (Louisville, Kentucky)	10	
2021	Sam Bachman	Right-handed pitcher	Miami University of Ohio (Oxford, Ohio)	9	
2022	Zach Neto	Shortstop	Campbell University (Buies Creek, North Carolina)	13	
2023	Nolan Schanuel	First Baseman	Florida Atlantic University (Boca Raton, Florida)	11	
2024	Christian Moore	Second Baseman	University of Tennessee (Knoxville, Tennessee)	8	
2025	Tyler Bremner	Right-handed pitcher	University of California, Santa Barbara (Santa Barbara, California)	2	
2026	Jared Grindlinger	Outfielder	Huntington Beach High School (Huntington Beach, California)	12	

== See also ==
- Los Angeles Angels of Anaheim minor league players

== Footnotes ==
- ^{V} Through the 2012 draft, free agents were evaluated by the Elias Sports Bureau and rated "Type A", "Type B", or not compensation-eligible. If a team offered arbitration to a player but that player refused and subsequently signed with another team, the original team was able to receive additional draft picks. If a "Type A" free agent left in this way, his previous team received a supplemental pick and a compensatory pick from the team with which he signed. If a "Type B" free agent left in this way, his previous team received only a supplemental pick. Since the 2013 draft, free agents are no longer classified by type; instead, compensatory picks are only awarded if the team offered its free agent a contract worth at least the average of the 125 current richest MLB contracts. However, if the free agent's last team acquired the player in a trade during the last year of his contract, it is ineligible to receive compensatory picks for that player.
- ^{a} Goodwin was also selected first overall in the 1971 draft by the Chicago White Sox, but instead opted for four years of college.
- ^{b} The Angels lost their first-round pick in 1979 to the San Francisco Giants as compensation for signing free agent Jim Barr.
- ^{c} The Angels lost their original first-round pick in 1980 to the Pittsburgh Pirates as compensation for signing free agent Bruce Kison, but received a compensatory first-round pick from the Houston Astros for losing free agent Nolan Ryan.
- ^{d} The Angels gained a compensatory first-round pick in 1985 from the Baltimore Orioles as compensation for losing free agent Fred Lynn.
- ^{e} The Angels gained a compensatory first-round pick in 1986 from the Baltimore Orioles as compensation for losing free agent Juan Beníquez.
- ^{f} The Angels gained a compensatory first-round pick in 1986 from the New York Yankees as compensation for losing free agent Al Holland.
- ^{g} The Angels gained a supplemental first-round pick in 1986 for losing free agent Juan Beníquez.
- ^{h} The Angels gained a supplemental first-round pick in 1986 for losing free agent Al Holland.
- ^{i} The Angels gained a supplemental first-round pick in 1987 for losing free agent Reggie Jackson.
- ^{j} The Angels lost their first-round pick in 1990 to the Montreal Expos as compensation for signing free agent Mark Langston.
- ^{k} The Angels gained a supplemental first-round pick in 1991 for losing free agent Chili Davis.
- ^{l} The Angels gained a supplemental first-round pick in 1992 for losing free agent Wally Joyner.
- ^{m} The Angels lost their first-round pick in 1996 to the New York Yankees as compensation for signing free agent Randy Velarde.
- ^{n} The Angels lost their first-round pick in 1999 to the Boston Red Sox as compensation for signing free agent Mo Vaughn.
- ^{o} The Angels gained a compensatory first-round pick in 2000 from the Oakland Athletics as compensation for losing free agent Mike Magnante.
- ^{p} The Angels gained a supplemental first-round pick in 2001 for losing free agent Mark Petkovsek.
- ^{q} The Angels lost their original first-round pick in 2005 to the Boston Red Sox as compensation for signing free agent Orlando Cabrera, but received a supplemental first-round pick for losing free agent Troy Percival.
- ^{r} The Angels lost their original first-round pick in 2007 to the Texas Rangers as compensation for signing free agent Gary Matthews Jr., but received a supplemental first-round pick for losing free agent Adam Kennedy.
- ^{s} The Angels lost their first-round pick in 2008 to the Minnesota Twins as compensation for signing free agent Torii Hunter.
- ^{t} The Angels gained a compensatory first-round pick in 2009 from the New York Mets as compensation for losing free agent Francisco Rodríguez.
- ^{u} The Angels gained a compensatory first-round pick in 2009 from the New York Yankees as compensation for losing free agent Mark Teixeira.
- ^{v} The Angels gained picks 40, 42, and 48 in the 2009 supplemental round for losing free agents Mark Teixeira, Francisco Rodríguez, and Jon Garland, respectively.
- ^{w} The Angels gained a compensatory first-round pick in 2010 from the Seattle Mariners as compensation for losing free agent Chone Figgins.
- ^{x} The Angels gained a compensatory first-round pick in 2010 from the Boston Red Sox as compensation for losing free agent John Lackey.
- ^{y} The Angels gained picks 37 and 40 in the 2010 supplemental round for losing free agents Chone Figgins and John Lackey, respectively.
- ^{z} The Angels lost their first-round pick in 2012 to the St. Louis Cardinals as compensation for signing free agent Albert Pujols.
