= Howell Trophy =

- Awarded for: Outstanding performance by a men's college basketball player in the state of Mississippi
- Country: United States
- Presented by: Mississippi Sports Hall of Fame
- First award: 2005
- Currently held by: Josh Hubbard, Mississippi State
- Website: Official website

The Howell Trophy is an award given annually to the best men's college basketball player in the state of Mississippi by the Mississippi Sports Hall of Fame. First awarded in 2005, the award is open to players from all four-year colleges in Mississippi and is named after former Mississippi State star Bailey Howell.

== Background ==
Mississippi-based telecommunications company Cellular South, known since 2011 as C Spire, in partnership with the Mississippi Sports Hall of Fame, began presenting its "Cellular South Outstanding Player Awards" in 1998, with the introduction of the Conerly Trophy, honoring the most outstanding college football player in the state of Mississippi. In September 2004, it was announced that the Hall of Fame and Cellular South would expand to include men's basketball, naming the award the Cellular South Howell Trophy in honor of Bailey Howell, the Mississippi State Bulldogs basketball alum and six-time NBA All-Star. The inaugural presentation of the trophy took place on April 14, 2005.

== Winners and finalists ==
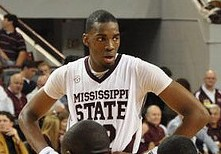
Mississippi State center Jarvis Varnado is one of four players to win the award twice

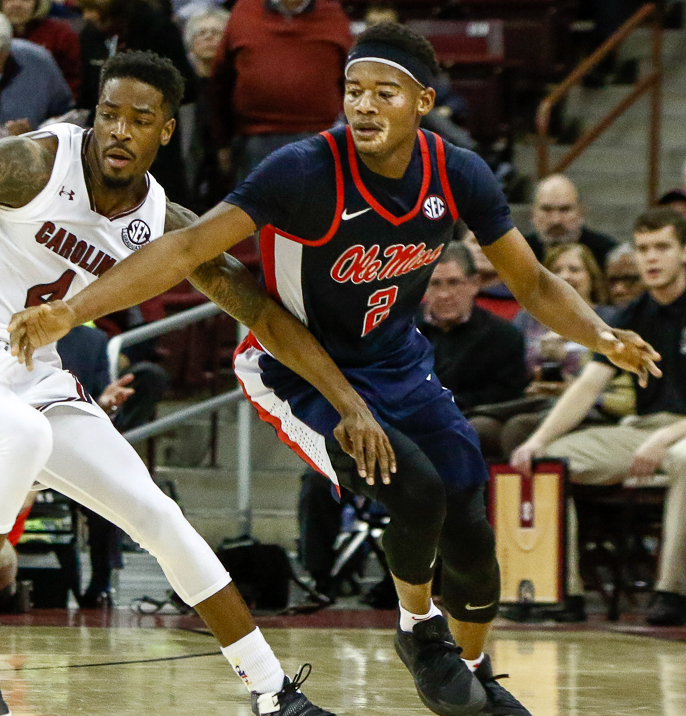
Ole Miss guard Devontae Shuler won the award in 2021

Since the inaugural award in 2005, the winner of the Howell Trophy is selected by a statewide panel of media members. Mississippi State power forward Lawrence Roberts was the first recipient of the award for his performance during the 2004–05 season.

Year	Winner	Pos	School	Ref	Other finalists
2004–05	Lawrence Roberts	PF	Mississippi State		Tommie Eddie, PF, Ole Miss; Shane Power, SF, Mississippi State
2005–06	Jasper Johnson	C	Delta State		Trey Johnson, SG, Jackson State; Charles Rhodes, PF, Mississippi State
2006–07	Trey Johnson	SG	Jackson State		Todd Abernethy, PG, Ole Miss; Jamont Gordon, PG, Mississippi State
2007–08	Jamont Gordon	PG	Mississippi State		Dwayne Curtis, PF, Ole Miss; Charles Rhodes, PF, Mississippi State
2008–09	Jarvis Varnado	PF/C	Mississippi State		David Huertas, SG, Ole Miss; Terrico White, SG, Ole Miss
2009–10	Jarvis Varnado (2)	PF/C	Mississippi State		Garrison Johnson, SG, Jackson State; Chris Warren, PG, Ole Miss
2010–11	Gary Flowers	PF	Southern Miss		Dee Bost, PG, Mississippi State; Chris Warren (2), PG, Ole Miss
2011–12	Arnett Moultrie	PF	Mississippi State		Dee Bost (2), PG, Mississippi State; Neil Watson, PG, Southern Miss
2012–13	Marshall Henderson	SG	Ole Miss		Dwayne Davis, SF, Southern Miss; Murphy Holloway, PF, Ole Miss
2013–14	Jarvis Summers	PG	Ole Miss		Marshall Henderson, SG, Ole Miss; Neil Watson (2), PG, Southern Miss
2014–15	Stefan Moody	SG	Ole Miss		Chip Armelin, SG, Southern Miss; Devin Schmidt, PG, Delta State
2015–16	Stefan Moody (2)	SG	Ole Miss		Gavin Ware, PF, Mississippi State; Quinndary Weatherspoon, SG, Mississippi State
2016–17	Sebastián Saiz	PF	Ole Miss		Devin Schmidt (2), SG, Delta State; Quinndary Weatherspoon (2), SG, Mississippi State
2017–18	Quinndary Weatherspoon	PF	Mississippi State		Cortez Edwards, SG, Southern Miss; Nick Weatherspoon, PG, Mississippi State
2018–19	Quinndary Weatherspoon (2)	PF	Mississippi State		Cortez Edwards (2), SG, Southern Miss; Breein Tyree, PG, Ole Miss
2019–20	Reggie Perry	SF	Mississippi State		Ledarius Woods, SF, Tougaloo College; Breein Tyree (2), PG, Ole Miss
2020–21	Devontae Shuler	SG	Ole Miss		Tristan Jarrett, SG, Jackson State; D. J. Stewart Jr., SG, Mississippi State
2021–22	Iverson Molinar	SG	Mississippi State		Tyler Stevenson, PF, Southern Miss; Jarkel Joiner, PG, Ole Miss
2022–23	Tolu Smith	PF	Mississippi State		Austin Crowley, SG, Southern Miss; Matthew Murrell, SG, Ole Miss
2023–24	Josh Hubbard	PG	Mississippi State		Austin Crowley (2), SG, Southern Miss; Matthew Murrell (2), SG, Ole Miss
2024–25	Josh Hubbard (2)	PG	Mississippi State		Sean Pedulla, PG, Ole Miss; Daeshun Ruffin, PG, Jackson State
2025–26	Josh Hubbard (3)	PG	Mississippi State		Daeshun Ruffin, PG, Jackson State; Tylik Weeks, PF, Southern Miss

== Trophies won by school ==
Rank	School	Winners	Other finalists
1	Mississippi State	13	11
2	Ole Miss	6	15
3	Southern Miss	1	10
4	Jackson State	1	5
5	Delta State	1	2
6	Tougaloo College	0	1

== See also ==
Other annual awards presented by the Mississippi Sports Hall of Fame for the best players in that state:

- Gillom Trophy – given to the best women's college basketball player
- C Spire Ferriss Trophy – given to the best college baseball player
- Conerly Trophy – given to the best overall college football player
- Hull Trophy – given to the best college football offensive lineman
