= Madison County School District (Mississippi) =

School district in Ridgeland, Mississippi

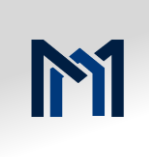

Location
- 476 Highland Colony Parkway; Ridgeland, MS 39157 United States

District information
- Motto: Mark Of Excellence
- Grades: Pre-K-12
- Superintendent: Ted Poore
- Asst. superintendent(s): Austin Brown, Dr. Capucine Robinson, Dr. Kim Brewer, Jay Harrison
- Schools: 20

Students and staff
- Athletic conference: 2A, 6A, 7A

Other information
- Website: Official website

The Madison County School District is a public school district based in Ridgeland, Mississippi (USA).

In addition to Ridgeland, the district serves the cities of Flora and Madison, a small portion of Jackson that lies in Madison County, the community of Camden, and most rural areas in Madison County. Kearney Park and most of Gluckstadt is in this district.

== Schools ==
=== Camden School Zone ===
- Velma Jackson High School (Grades 9-12)
  - Shirley Simmons Middle School (Grades 6-8)
  - Luther Branson Elementary School (Grades K-5)
  - Camden Elementary School (Grades K-5)

=== Ridgeland School Zone ===
- Ridgeland High School (Grades 9-12)
  - Olde Towne Middle School (Grades 6-8)
  - Highland Elementary School (Grades 3-5)
  - Ann Smith Elementary School (Grades K-2)

=== Gluckstadt School Zone ===
- Germantown High School (Grades 9-12)
  - Germantown Middle School (Grades 6-8)
  - Madison Crossing Elementary School (Grades K-5)
  - Mannsdale Upper Elementary School (Grades 3-5)
  - Mannsdale Elementary School (Grades K-2)

=== Madison-Flora School Zone ===
- Madison Central High School (Grades 10-12)
  - Rosa Scott High School (Grade 9)
  - Madison Middle School (Grades 6-8)
  - Madison Station Elementary School (Grades K-5)
  - East Flora Elementary School (Grades K-5)
  - Madison Avenue Upper Elementary School (Grades 3-5)
  - Madison Avenue Elementary School (Grades K-2)

=== Alternative School ===
- Academic Options Center (Grades K-12)

== Former Schools ==
- East Flora High School
- Madison-Ridgeland High School
- Madison Station Elementary School (Original)
- Scott High School
- East Flora Middle School

== Demographics ==
In 2017 39% of the students were black. That year, under Mississippi school accountability rankings, the school received an "A".

=== 2018-19 school year ===
There were more than 13,000 students enrolled in the Madison County School District during the 2018–2019 school year. The gender makeup of the district was 49% female and 51% male. The racial makeup of the district was 38.40% African American, 57.45% White, 1.51% Hispanic, 2.56% Asian, and 0.08% Native American. 25.4% of the district's students were eligible to receive free lunch.

== Accountability statistics ==
	2006-07	2005-06	2004-05	2003-04	2002-03
District Accreditation Status	Accredited	Accredited	Accredited	Accredited	Accredited
School Performance Classifications
Level 5 (Superior Performing) Schools	10	8	8	6	6
Level 4 (Exemplary) Schools	1	4	0	3	2
Level 3 (Successful) Schools	5	2	6	3	2
Level 2 (Under Performing) Schools	0	0	0	1	3
Level 1 (Low Performing) Schools	0	0	0	0	0
Not Assigned	2	2	2	2	2
