= Otis G. Collins =

American businessman and politician

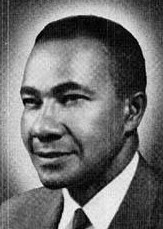

Member of the Illinois House of Representatives

Personal details
- Party: Democratic

Otis Grant Collins (May 2, 1917 – January 1, 1992) was a businessman and politician in Illinois. He was succeeded in office after his death by his wife Earlean Collins.

Collins was born in Camden, Mississippi and was an African-American. He moved to Chicago, Illinois with his family. Collins served in the United States Military during World War II. He went to Wilson Junior College, Northwestern University, and Roosevelt University. Collins was involved in the insurance and real estate business and was involved in the labor union movement. Collins served in the Illinois House of Representatives from 1965 to 1973 and was a Democrat. Collins died in Detroit, Michigan. Collins was married to Earlean Collins who also served in the Illinois General Assembly. They then separated.
