= Velma Jackson High School =

Location
- 2000 Loring Rd Exd; Camden, Madison County, Mississippi 39045; United States; 32°46′32″N 89°52′01″W

Information
- Type: Public
- Established: 1960
- School district: Madison County School District
- NCES School ID: 280279000541
- Principal: Perry Green
- Staff: 30.84 (FTE)
- Grades: 9–12
- Enrollment: 202 (2023–2024)
- Student to teacher ratio: 6.91
- Colors: Royal Blue and Gold
- Fight song: Get Ready
- Athletics conference: 1A
- Nickname: Falcons
- Affiliations: Madison County School District, Mississippi High School Activities Association
- Website: vjh.madison-schools.com

Velma Jackson High School is a public high school in unincorporated Madison County, Mississippi, United States (with a Camden postal address). It is a part of the Madison County School District.

== Notable alumni ==
- Quinndary Weatherspoon, NBA player
- Willie Young, Coach (1992-2002) and NFL player
