= Ernie Zeigler =

American college basketball coach (born 1966)

Current position
- Title: Assistant coach
- Team: Nebraska
- Conference: Big Ten Conference

Biographical details
- Born: January 31, 1966 (age 60); Detroit, Michigan, U.S.

Playing career
- 1984–1986: Schoolcraft
- 1986–1987: Armstrong Atlantic State
- 1987–1988: Northwood

Coaching career (HC unless noted)
- 1990–1996: Cody HS (asst.)
- 1996–1997: Henan Wildcats
- 1997–1999: Al-Halil
- 1999–2000: Kansas State (asst.)
- 2000–2001: Bowling Green (asst.)
- 2001–2003: Pittsburgh (asst.)
- 2003–2006: UCLA (asst.)
- 2006–2012: Central Michigan
- 2013–2015: Detroit (asst.)
- 2015–2022: Mississippi State (asst.)
- 2022–present: Nebraska (asst.)

Head coaching record
- Overall: 75–111 (.403)

Ernest Franklin Zeigler II (born January 31, 1966) is an American college basketball coach, currently an assistant at the University of Nebraska–Lincoln. He spent the previous eight seasons as an assistant coach at Mississippi State, and prior to that was the men's head coach at Central Michigan University. He received a Bachelor's in Business Management from Cleary College in 1994. He played collegiately at Schoolcraft College (1984–86), Armstrong Atlantic State University (1986–87) and Northwood University (1987–88).

Zeigler has also coached in China, Saudi Arabia, at Kansas State, Bowling Green and at Detroit Cody High School before serving on Ben Howland's staff at Pittsburgh and at UCLA. Zeigler left UCLA to take on the head coaching job at Central Michigan where his son, Trey Zeigler, played for him. Trey transferred to Pittsburgh after his father was fired.

== Head coaching record ==
Record table
Season	Team	Overall	Conference	Standing	Postseason
Central Michigan (Mid-American Conference) (2006–2012)
2006–07	Central Michigan	13–18	7–9	3rd (West)	
2007–08	Central Michigan	14–17	8–8	T–2nd (West)	
2008–09	Central Michigan	12–19	7–9	T–1st (West)	
2009–10	Central Michigan	15–15	9–7	1st (West)	
2010–11	Central Michigan	10–21	7–9	3rd (West)	
2011–12	Central Michigan	11–21	5–11	4th (West)	
Central Michigan:		75–111 (.403)	43–53 (.448)		
Total:		75–111 (.403)			
National champion Postseason invitational champion Conference regular season champion Conference regular season and conference tournament champion Division regular season champion Division regular season and conference tournament champion Conference tournament champion
