= Madison Central High School (Mississippi) =

Public high school in Madison, Mississippi, United States

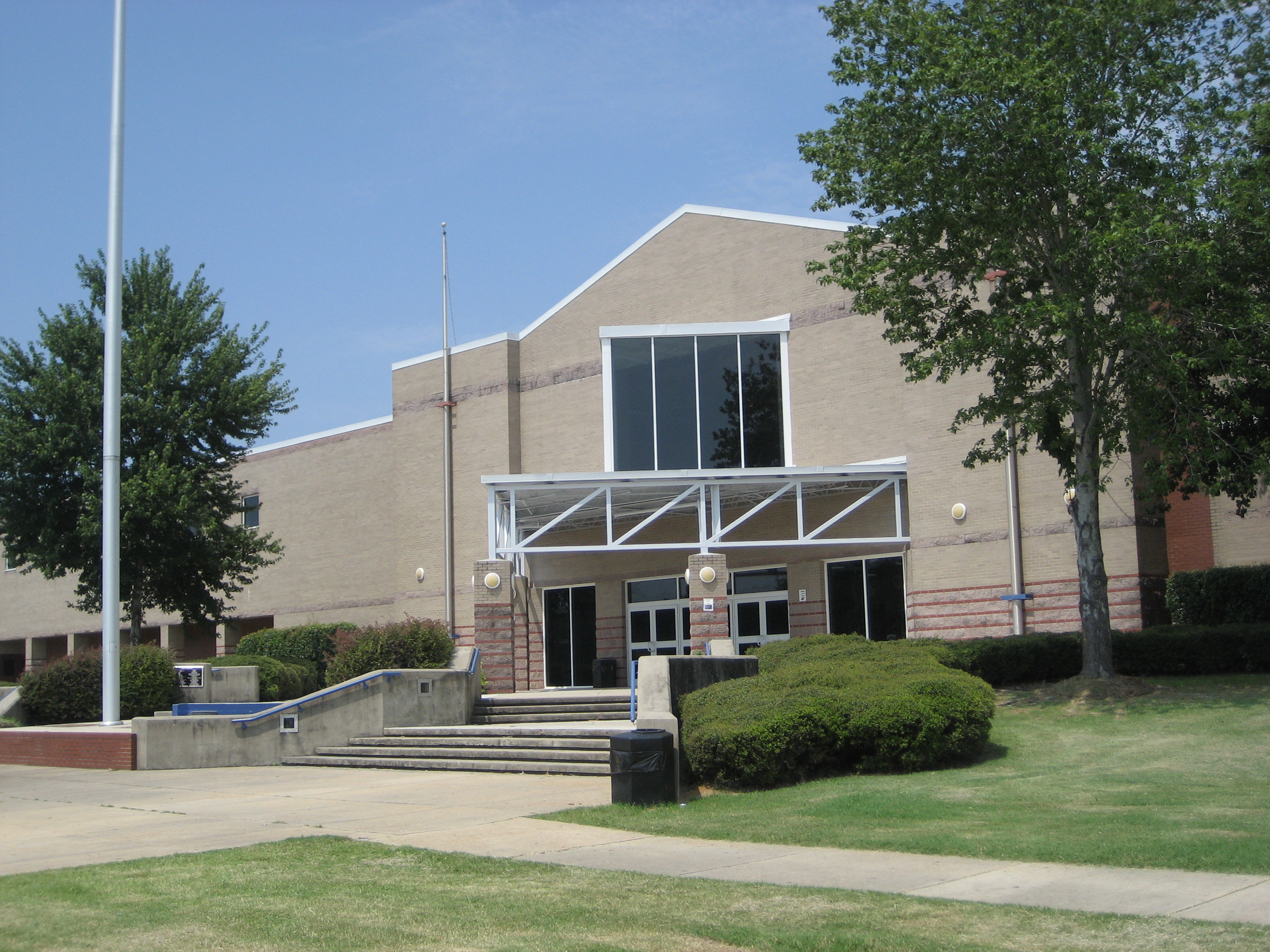
- The main entrance of Madison Central High School

Location
- 1417 Highland Colony Parkway; Madison, Mississippi; United States; 32.468338°N 90.156666°W

Information
- Type: Public
- Motto: Truth, Honor
- Established: 1991; 35 years ago
- School district: Madison County School District
- Principal: Anthony Cole
- Teaching staff: 88.47 (on an FTE basis)
- Grades: 10–12
- Gender: Coeducational
- Enrollment: 1,254 (2023-2024)
- Student to teacher ratio: 14.17
- Colors: Orange and blue
- Mascot: Jaguar
- Newspaper: The Uproar
- Yearbook: The Pawprint
- Affiliations: Madison County School District, Mississippi High School Activities Association, The College Board, Star School
- Literary Magazine: Harvest
- Website: mchs.madison-schools.com

Madison Central High School (MCHS) is a suburban public high school located in Madison, Mississippi, United States. Madison Central is part of the Madison County School District. The principal is Dr. Doug Jones.

The school colors are orange and blue and the school mascot is the jaguar. Madison Central is classified as a 7A public high school by the Mississippi High School Activities Association (MHSAA). In 2002, Madison Central was the first Mississippi visit of President George W. Bush.

== History ==
Madison Central began classes in fall 1991, having been built at an estimated $9.7 million cost. The school absorbed students from Madison Ridgeland High School and East Flora High School.

== Attendance boundary ==
In addition to Madison its attendance boundary includes Flora, and Kearney Park.

== Academics ==
About a quarter of MCHS students take an Advanced Placement exam during their time at the school. The school's academic proficiency rates are above average for the state of Mississippi.

The Madison Central Academic Decathlon team claimed state championships every year from 2003 to 2019.

== Athletics ==
State Championships
| Sport | Year(s) |
|---|---|
| Baseball | 2002, 2009, 2016, 2021, 2025 |
| Cross country (boys) | 2014 |
| Football | 1999, 2021 |
| Golf (boys) | 2014, 2015, 2016, 2023, 2024 |
| Powerlifting (boys) | 2014 |
| Slow pitch | 2011 |
| Soccer (boys) | 2013, 2014, 2015, 2016, 2021, 2025 |
| Soccer (girls) | 2000, 2005, 2009, 2011, 2014, 2015, 2016 |
| Tennis (co-ed) | 2021, 2022, 2024 |

Both the boys' and girls' soccer teams were nationally ranked by MaxPreps after their respective 2016 seasons.

Beginning in the 2023-2024 school year Madison Central was one of 24 MHSAA members to get reclassified as 7A school for athletics.

== Performing arts ==
Madison Central has participated in the National Adjudicators Invitational, The Disney Honors, as well as performing in Carnegie Hall in New York City in April 2008.

MCHS has three competitive show choirs, the Varsity mixed-gender "Reveille”, the all-female "Renown", and the Junior Varsity mixed-gender “Radiance”. The program also hosts an annual competition, the Deep South Classic.

== Notable alumni ==
- Ryan Bolden – professional baseball player
- Shaq Buchanan (born 1997) – basketball player in the Israeli Basketball Premier League
- Mike Espy Jr. (born 1982) – former professional football player
- Stephen Gostkowski – former professional football player
- Parys Haralson – professional football player
- Larry Hart (born 1987) – former professional football player
- Jimmy Holiday (born 2001) – professional football player
- Sarah Beth James – Miss Mississippi 2010
- Braden Montgomery – baseball player
- D. J. Montgomery (born 1996) – professional football player
- Chris Spencer – professional football player
- Xavian Stapleton - former college basketball player
- Spencer Turnbull - professional baseball pitcher
