= Camden, Mississippi =

- Unincorporated community
- Location within Mississippi Location within the United States
- Coordinates: 32°46′56″N 89°50′19″W
- Country: United States
- State: Mississippi
- County: Madison
- Elevation: 338 ft (103 m)
- Time zone: UTC-6 (Central (CST))
  - Summer (DST): UTC-5 (CDT)
- ZIP code: 39045
- Area code: 601
- GNIS feature ID: 667955

Camden is an unincorporated community located on Mississippi Highway 17 in Madison County, Mississippi, United States. Camden is located approximately 12 miles (19 km) northeast of Sharon and is located within the Jackson Metropolitan Statistical Area.

Although unincorporated, Camden has a post office and a zip code of 39045.

The town was named for Camden, South Carolina by Mississippi Governor William McWillie. McWillie was raised in Camden, South Carolina, and was in The South Carolina House of Representatives and the South Carolina Senate. He moved to Mississippi in 1845, where he was elected to Congress, and then, in 1858, he was elected the 22nd Governor of Mississippi. He is buried in Kirkwood Cemetery, outside of Camden, Mississippi.

== Education ==
It is in the Madison County School District.

Residents are zoned to Camden Elementary School. Residents are in turn zoned to Shirley D. Simmons Middle School and Velma Jackson High School.

== Notable people ==
- Otis G. Collins, former member of the Illinois House of Representatives, was born in Camden.
- George Doherty, head football coach at Northwestern State University from 1972 to 1974
- John Primer, Chicago blues musician

== See also ==
- Disappearance of Myra Lewis, a child who went missing from Camden in 2014
