= Mississippi High School Activities Association =

- Abbreviation: MHSAA
- Type: Volunteer; NPO
- Legal status: Association
- Purpose: Athletic/Educational
- Headquarters: 1201 Clinton/Raymond Rd. Clinton, MS 39060
- Region served: Mississippi
- Executive Director: Don Hinton
- Affiliations: National Federation of State High School Associations
- Staff: 13
- Website: misshsaa.com
- Remarks: (601) 924-6400

The Mississippi High School Activities Association (MHSAA) is the official sanctioning body of all public and some private junior high and high school academic and athletic competitions in the U.S. state of Mississippi. It is a non-profit organization and is headquartered in Clinton, Mississippi. The MHSAA is a member of the National Federation of State High School Associations (NFHS).

== Responsibilities ==
The athletic competitions of which the MHSAA oversees include: archery, football, swimming, slowpitch softball, volleyball, cross country, soccer, basketball, powerlifting, tennis, golf, track, baseball and fastpitch softball.

The activities which the MHSAA oversees include: chess, esports, debate, drama, speech, writing-prose, poetry, short stories, essays and music, both band and choral.

The MHSAA state football championship games are contested in early December. The site alternates between Vaught–Hemingway Stadium in Oxford, Davis Wade Stadium in Starkville and M. M. Roberts Stadium in Hattiesburg.

== Classifications ==
The MHSAA is divided into seven classifications. Enrollment is usually based on numbers from the Mississippi Department of Education. These numbers are considered official for classification purposes over a two-year period. For example, enrollment numbers submitted in 2016, would be used for the 2017–18 and 2018–19 school years.

On April 7, 2022, it was announced that the MHSAA would be adding a seventh classification, starting in the 2023–2024 school year, and will be based on student numbers for grades 9-11. Under the new system, the largest 24 schools in terms of enrollment as per the Mississippi Department of Education are in the new 7A classification. The next 24 schools are in 6A and the next 24 schools after that make up the 5A classification. Classes 4A, 3A, and 2A are to have 40 schools apiece, while the remaining schools are in Class 1A.

The reason for adding a seventh classification, according to MHSAA director Rickey Neaves, was there being an almost 1,000-student difference between Tupelo High School, which had 1,907 students per the 2021–2023 enrollment numbers and largest school in the 6A classification, and the smallest 6A school Center Hill High School, which had 1,047 students. Neaves said that by adding a Class 7A, the student difference between classifications would be shortened significantly.

== See also ==
- Midsouth Association of Independent Schools
