= 2015–16 Vanderbilt Commodores men's basketball team =

American college basketball season

2015–16 Vanderbilt Commodores men's basketball

NCAA tournament, First Four
- Conference: Southeastern Conference
- Record: 19–14 (11–7 SEC)
- Head coach: Kevin Stallings (17th season)
- Assistant coaches: Adam Cohen; Derrick Jones; Tom Richardson
- Home arena: Memorial Gymnasium

2015–16 Southeastern Conference men's basketball standings
	Conf.				Overall
Team	W		L	PCT	W		L	PCT
No. 15 Texas A&M	13	–	5	.722	28	–	9	.757
No. 10 Kentucky †	13	–	5	.722	27	–	9	.750
South Carolina	11	–	7	.611	25	–	9	.735
Vanderbilt	11	–	7	.611	19	–	14	.576
LSU	11	–	7	.611	19	–	14	.576
Ole Miss	10	–	8	.556	20	–	12	.625
Georgia	10	–	8	.556	20	–	14	.588
Florida	9	–	9	.500	21	–	15	.583
Arkansas	9	–	9	.500	16	–	16	.500
Alabama	8	–	10	.444	18	–	15	.545
Mississippi State	7	–	11	.389	14	–	17	.452
Tennessee	6	–	12	.333	15	–	19	.441
Auburn	5	–	13	.278	11	–	20	.355
Missouri^{*}	3	–	15	.167	10	–	21	.323
† 2016 SEC tournament winner^{*}Ineligible for postseason play due to self-imposed postseason ban. Rankings from AP poll

The 2015–16 Vanderbilt Commodores men's basketball team represented Vanderbilt University in the 2015–16 NCAA Division I men's basketball season. This was Kevin Stallings' 17th and final year as the Vanderbilt head coach. The Commodores played their home games at Memorial Gymnasium in Nashville, Tennessee, as a member of the Southeastern Conference. They finished the season 19–14, 11–7 in SEC play to finish in a three way tie for third place. They lost in the second round of the SEC tournament to Tennessee. They received an at-large bid to the NCAA tournament where they lost in the First Four to Wichita State.

On March 27, 2016, head coach Kevin Stallings resigned to become the head coach at Pittsburgh. He finished at Vanderbilt with a 17-year record of 332–220. Shortly thereafter, the school hired Valparaiso head coach Bryce Drew as head coach.

== Previous season ==
The 2014–15 Commodores finished the season 21–14, 9–9 in SEC play to finish at seventh place in the SEC standings. As the #7 seed, they lost in the second round of the SEC tournament to Tennessee. Vanderbilt participated in the National Invitation Tournament as an #5 seed, defeating Saint Mary's and South Dakota State before falling to the eventual NIT champion, the Stanford Cardinal, in the quarterfinals, marking the end of the Commodores' season.

== Before the season ==
=== Departures ===
Name	Number	Pos.	Height	Weight	Year	Hometown	Notes
Shelby Moats	34	Forward	6'8"	225	Senior	Waconia, MN	Graduated
James Siakam	35	Forward	6'7"	225	Senior	Douala, Cameroon	Graduated

=== Class of 2015 signees ===
College recruiting information
Name	Hometown	School	Height	Weight	Commit date
Djery Baptiste; C	Gonaïves, Haiti	Prestonwood Christian Academy	6 ft 11 in (2.11 m)	250 lb (110 kg)	Sep 10, 2014
Djery Baptiste; C	Recruit ratings: Scout: Rivals: ESPN:				
Camron Justice; SG	Hindman, Kentucky	Knott County Central	6 ft 2 in (1.88 m)	175 lb (79 kg)	Sep 1, 2010
Camron Justice; SG	Recruit ratings: Scout: Rivals: ESPN:				
Joseph Toye; PF	Chicago, Illinois	Whitney M. Young Magnet High School	6 ft 7 in (2.01 m)	180 lb (82 kg)	Apr 29, 2014
Joseph Toye; PF	Recruit ratings: Scout: Rivals: ESPN:				
Overall recruit ranking: Scout: 23 Rivals: 30
Note: In many cases, Scout, Rivals, 247Sports, On3, and ESPN may conflict in their listings of height and weight.; In these cases, the average was taken. ESPN grades are on a 100-point scale.; Sources: "Vanderbilt 2015 Basketball Commitments". Rivals.; "2015 Vanderbilt Basketball Commits". Scout.; "ESPN". ESPN.; "Scout.com Team Recruiting Rankings". Scout.; "2015 Team Ranking". Rivals.

== Roster ==
2015–16 Vanderbilt Commodores men's basketball team
Players
Coaches

Pos.	#	Name	Height	Weight	Year	Hometown
G	0	Camron Justice	6 ft 3 in (1.91 m)	180 lb (82 kg)	Fr	Hindman, Kentucky
F	2	Joseph Toye	6 ft 7 in (2.01 m)	201 lb (91 kg)	Fr	Chicago, Illinois
C	3	Luke Kornet	7 ft 2 in (2.18 m)	240 lb (109 kg)	Jr	Lantana, Texas
G	4	Wade Baldwin IV	6 ft 3 in (1.91 m)	194 lb (88 kg)	So	Belle Mead, New Jersey
G/F	5	Matthew Fisher-Davis	6 ft 5 in (1.96 m)	185 lb (84 kg)	So	Charlotte, North Carolina
G	10	Nathan Watkins	6 ft 5 in (1.96 m)	186 lb (84 kg)	Sr	Brentwood, Tennessee
F	11	Jeff Roberson	6 ft 6 in (1.98 m)	220 lb (100 kg)	So	Houston, Texas
C	12	Djery Baptiste	6 ft 10 in (2.08 m)	235 lb (107 kg)	Fr	Gonaïves, Haiti
G	13	Riley LaChance	6 ft 2 in (1.88 m)	182 lb (83 kg)	So	Brookfield, Wisconsin
G	14	Carter Josephs	6 ft 0 in (1.83 m)	180 lb (82 kg)	Sr	San Antonio, Texas
F	21	Semir Sehic	6 ft 9 in (2.06 m)	247 lb (112 kg)	Fr	Atlanta, Georgia
G	24	Nolan Cressler	6 ft 4 in (1.93 m)	210 lb (95 kg)	RS Jr	Pittsburgh, Pennsylvania
C	30	Damian Jones	7 ft 0 in (2.13 m)	245 lb (111 kg)	Jr	Baton Rouge, Louisiana
C	40	Josh Henderson	7 ft 0 in (2.13 m)	237 lb (108 kg)	GS	Roanoke, Virginia

Head coach

- Kevin Stallings (Purdue)

Assistant coach(es)

- Adam Cohen (Arizona)
- Derrick Jones (New Orleans)
- Tom Richardson (St. Xavier (IL))

Legend

- (C) Team captain
- (S) Suspended
- (I) Ineligible
- (W) Walk-on
- Injured
- Current redshirt

Roster

== Schedule and results ==
Date time, TV	Rank^{#}	Opponent^{#}	Result	Record	Site (attendance) city, state
Regular season
11/13/2015*; 7:00 pm	No. 18	Austin Peay; Maui Invitational Opening Round	W 80–41	1–0	Memorial Gymnasium (10,116); Nashville, TN
11/16/2015*; 7:00 pm	No. 17	Gardner–Webb	W 98–62	2–0	Memorial Gymnasium (9,728); Nashville, TN
11/19/2015*; 7:00 pm	No. 17	Stony Brook	W 79–72 ^{OT}	3–0	Memorial Gymnasium (9,819); Nashville, TN
11/23/2015*; 1:30 pm, ESPN2	No. 19	vs. St. John's; Maui Invitational quarterfinals	W 92–55	4–0	Lahaina Civic Center (2,400); Maui, HI
11/24/2015*; 6:30 pm, ESPN	No. 19	vs. Wake Forest; Maui Invitational semifinals	W 86–64	5–0	Lahaina Civic Center (2,400); Maui, HI
11/25/2015*; 9:00 pm, ESPN	No. 19	vs. No. 5 Kansas; Maui Invitational championship	L 63–70	5–1	Lahaina Civic Center (2,400); Maui, HI
12/02/2015*; 7:00 pm	No. 16	Detroit	W 102–52	6–1	Memorial Gymnasium (9,958); Nashville, TN
12/06/2015*; 7:00 pm, ESPNU	No. 16	at No. 25 Baylor	L 67–69	6–2	Ferrell Center (7,084); Waco, TX
12/09/2015*; 8:00 pm, ESPNU	No. 21	Dayton	L 67–72	6–3	Memorial Gymnasium (10,469); Nashville, TN
12/19/2015*; 2:00 pm, SECN		Wofford	W 80–56	7–3	Memorial Gymnasium (10,667); Nashville, TN
12/22/2015*; 7:00 pm, BTN		at No. 14 Purdue	L 55–68	7–4	Mackey Arena (14,846); West Lafayette, IN
12/30/2015*; 8:00 pm, SECN		Western Michigan	W 86–61	8–4	Memorial Gymnasium (10,092); Nashville, TN
01/02/2016; 8:00 pm, ESPN2		LSU	L 82–90	8–5 (0–1)	Memorial Gymnasium (13,380); Nashville, TN
01/05/2016; 8:00 pm, SECN		at Arkansas	L 85–90 ^{OT}	8–6 (0–2)	Bud Walton Arena (14,179); Fayetteville, AR
01/09/2016; 2:00 pm, ESPNU		at No. 22 South Carolina	L 65–69	8–7 (0–3)	Colonial Life Arena (15,055); Columbia, SC
01/12/2016; 8:00 pm, ESPNU		Auburn	W 75–57	9–7 (1–3)	Memorial Gymnasium (10,414); Nashville, TN
01/16/2016; 5:00 pm, SECN		Alabama	W 71–63	10–7 (2–3)	Memorial Gymnasium (12,565); Nashville, TN
01/20/2016; 8:00 pm, SECN		at Tennessee	W 88–74	11–7 (3–3)	Thompson–Boling Arena (13,561); Knoxville, TN
01/23/2016; 3:00 pm, ESPN		at No. 23 Kentucky	L 57–76	11–8 (3–4)	Rupp Arena (22,975); Lexington, KY
01/26/2016; 8:00 pm, ESPNU		Florida	W 60–59	12–8 (4–4)	Memorial Gymnasium (11,351); Nashville, TN
01/30/2016*; 11:00 am, ESPN2		at Texas; Big 12/SEC Challenge	L 59–72	12–9	Frank Erwin Center (13,041); Austin, TX
02/04/2016; 6:00 pm, ESPN2		No. 8 Texas A&M	W 77–60	13–9 (5–4)	Memorial Gymnasium (10,432); Nashville, TN
02/06/2016; 7:00 pm, ESPNU		at Ole Miss	L 78–85	13–10 (5–5)	The Pavilion at Ole Miss (9,500); Oxford, MS
02/10/2016; 8:00 pm, SECN		Missouri	W 86–71	14–10 (6–5)	Memorial Gymnasium (10,006); Nashville, TN
02/13/2016; 5:00 pm, ESPN2		at Auburn	W 86–57	15–10 (7–5)	Auburn Arena (7,954); Auburn, AL
02/16/2016; 8:00 pm, SECN		at Mississippi State	L 74–75	15–11 (7–6)	Humphrey Coliseum (6,194); Starkville, MS
02/20/2016; 11:00 am, ESPN2		Georgia	W 80–67	16–11 (8–6)	Memorial Gymnasium (11,745); Nashville, TN
02/23/2016; 6:00 pm, SECN		at Florida	W 87–74	17–11 (9–6)	O'Connell Center (9,035); Gainesville, FL
02/27/2016; 3:00 pm, CBS		No. 16 Kentucky	W 74–62	18–11 (10–6)	Memorial Gymnasium (14,326); Nashville, TN
03/01/2016; 6:00 pm, SECN		Tennessee	W 86–69	19–11 (11–6)	Memorial Gymnasium (13,099); Nashville, TN
03/06/2016; 11:00 am, ESPN2		at No. 20 Texas A&M	L 67–76	19–12 (11–7)	Reed Arena (12,007); College Station, TX
SEC tournament
03/10/2016; 2:30 pm, SECN/ESPN	(5)	vs. (12) Tennessee; Second Round	L 65–67	19–13	Bridgestone Arena (12,270); Nashville, TN
NCAA tournament
03/15/2016*; 8:10 pm, truTV	(11 S)	vs. (11 S) Wichita State; First Four	L 50–70	19–14	UD Arena (11,728); Dayton, OH
*Non-conference game. ^{#}Rankings from AP Poll. (#) Tournament seedings in parentheses. S=South Region. All times are in Central Time..

== See also ==
- 2015–16 NCAA Division I men's basketball season
