= 2015–16 Missouri Tigers men's basketball team =

American college basketball season

2015–16 Missouri Tigers men's basketball
- Conference: Southeastern Conference
- Record: 10–21 (3–15 SEC)
- Head coach: Kim Anderson (2nd season)
- Assistant coaches: Corey Tate (1st year); Brad Loos (2nd year); Rob Fulford (2nd year)
- Home arena: Mizzou Arena

2015–16 Southeastern Conference men's basketball standings
	Conf.				Overall
Team	W		L	PCT	W		L	PCT
No. 15 Texas A&M	13	–	5	.722	28	–	9	.757
No. 10 Kentucky †	13	–	5	.722	27	–	9	.750
South Carolina	11	–	7	.611	25	–	9	.735
Vanderbilt	11	–	7	.611	19	–	14	.576
LSU	11	–	7	.611	19	–	14	.576
Ole Miss	10	–	8	.556	20	–	12	.625
Georgia	10	–	8	.556	20	–	14	.588
Florida	9	–	9	.500	21	–	15	.583
Arkansas	9	–	9	.500	16	–	16	.500
Alabama	8	–	10	.444	18	–	15	.545
Mississippi State	7	–	11	.389	14	–	17	.452
Tennessee	6	–	12	.333	15	–	19	.441
Auburn	5	–	13	.278	11	–	20	.355
Missouri^{*}	3	–	15	.167	10	–	21	.323
† 2016 SEC tournament winner^{*}Ineligible for postseason play due to self-imposed postseason ban. Rankings from AP poll

The 2015–16 Missouri Tigers men's basketball team represented the University of Missouri in the 2015–16 NCAA Division I men's basketball season. Their head coach was Kim Anderson, who was in his second year as the head coach at Missouri. The team played its home games at Mizzou Arena in Columbia, Missouri, and played its fourth season in the Southeastern Conference. They finished the season 10–21, 3–15 in SEC play to finish in last place. Due to a self-imposed postseason ban, Missouri did not participate in the SEC tournament.

== Previous season ==
The Tigers finished the 2014–15 season 9–23, 3–15 in SEC play to finish in last place in conference. They lost in the first round of the SEC tournament to South Carolina.

== Season ==
Missouri was coming off a disappointing 2014-15 season that saw the Tigers end the year 9–23, 3–15 in SEC play, to finish in last place. They lost in the first round of the SEC tournament to South Carolina.

On January 13, 2016, Missouri announced that it was self-imposing a ban from postseason play in 2016 due to violations committed under the previous head coach, Frank Haith. Missouri vacated all wins from the 2013–14 season, and would lose one of its men's basketball scholarships in 2015–16 and another no later than the 2017–18 season.

On February 16, 2016, Missouri announced that junior guard Wes Clark was "no longer a member of the men's basketball program," just minutes before their game against South Carolina.

=== Departures ===
Name	Number	Pos.	Height	Weight	Year	Hometown	Reason for departure
Deuce Bello	2	Guard	6'4"	177	RS Jr.	Greensboro, North Carolina	Transferred to East Tennessee State
Johnathan Williams	3	Forward	6'9"	208	So.	Memphis, Tennessee	Transferred to Gonzaga
Keith Shamburger	14	Guard	5'11"	170	RS Sr.	Gardena, California	Graduated
Montaque Gill-Caesar	13	Guard	6'6"	215	Fr	Vaughan, Ontario, Canada	Transferred to San Diego State University
Keanau Post	45	Forward	6'11"	268	Sr.	Victoria, British Columbia, Canada	Graduated

=== 2015 recruits ===
College recruiting (2015)
Name	Hometown	School	Height	Weight	Commit date
Kevin Puryear; PF	Blue Springs, MO	Blue Springs South	6 ft 7 in (2.01 m)	225 lb (102 kg)	Aug 21, 2014
Kevin Puryear; PF	Recruit ratings: Scout: Rivals: 247Sports:				
Cullen VanLeer; SG	Pacific, MO	Pacific	6 ft 4 in (1.93 m)	195 lb (88 kg)	Sep 5, 2014
Cullen VanLeer; SG	Recruit ratings: Scout: Rivals: 247Sports: ESPN:				
Terrance Phillips; PG	Mouth of Wilson, VA	Oak Hill Academy	5 ft 10 in (1.78 m)	170 lb (77 kg)	Jan 3, 2015
Terrance Phillips; PG	Recruit ratings: Scout: Rivals: 247Sports: ESPN:				
Martavian Payne; SG	Saint Louis, MO	John A. Logan C.C.	6 ft 2 in (1.88 m)	190 lb (86 kg)	Apr 18, 2015
Martavian Payne; SG	Recruit ratings: Rivals: 247Sports:				
Russell Woods; PF	Chicago, IL	John A. Logan C.C.	6 ft 8 in (2.03 m)	215 lb (98 kg)	Apr 18, 2015
Russell Woods; PF	Recruit ratings: Rivals: 247Sports:				
K.J. Walton; SG	Brownsburg, Indiana	Brownsburg	6 ft 4 in (1.93 m)	180 lb (82 kg)	May 8, 2015
K.J. Walton; SG	Recruit ratings: Scout: Rivals: 247Sports: ESPN:				
Overall recruit ranking:
Note: In many cases, Scout, Rivals, 247Sports, On3, and ESPN may conflict in their listings of height and weight.; In these cases, the average was taken. ESPN grades are on a 100-point scale.; Sources:

== Roster ==
2015–16 Missouri Tigers men's basketball team
Players
Coaches

Pos.	#	Name	Height	Weight	Year	Previous school	Hometown
G	1	Terrance Phillips	5 ft 10 in (1.78 m)	170 lb (77 kg)	Fr	Oak Hill Academy	Mouth of Wilson, VA
G	2	Martavian Payne	6 ft 2 in (1.88 m)	190 lb (86 kg)	Jr	John A. Logan C.C.	St. Louis, MO
G	4	Tramaine Isabell	6 ft 1 in (1.85 m)	185 lb (84 kg)	So	Garfield H.S.	Seattle, WA
F	5	D'Angelo Allen	6 ft 6 in (1.98 m)	185 lb (84 kg)	So	Kimball H.S.	Dallas, TX
G	10	K. J. Walton	6 ft 4 in (1.93 m)	180 lb (82 kg)	Fr	Brownsburg H.S.	Brownsburg, IN
G	11	Jimmy Barton (W)	5 ft 9 in (1.75 m)	160 lb (73 kg)	Jr	Houston Baptist	St. Louis, MO
G	12	Namon Wright	6 ft 4 in (1.93 m)	175 lb (79 kg)	So	Pacific Hills	Los Angeles, CA
G	15	Wes Clark (injured)	6 ft 0 in (1.83 m)	171 lb (78 kg)	Jr	Romulus H.S.	Detroit, MI
F	23	JaKeenan Gant	6 ft 8 in (2.03 m)	200 lb (91 kg)	So	Effingham County H.S.	Springfield, GA
F	24	Kevin Puryear	6 ft 7 in (2.01 m)	225 lb (102 kg)	Fr	Blue Springs South H.S.	Blue Springs, MO
F	25	Russell Woods	6 ft 8 in (2.03 m)	215 lb (98 kg)	Jr	John A. Logan C.C.	Chicago, IL
F	32	Adam Wolf	6 ft 7 in (2.01 m)	210 lb (95 kg)	Fr	Beaver Dam H.S.	Beaver Dam, WI
G	33	Cullen VanLeer	6 ft 4 in (1.93 m)	195 lb (88 kg)	Fr	Pacific H.S.	Pacific, MO
F	42	Hayden Barnard (W)	6 ft 10 in (2.08 m)	215 lb (98 kg)	RS So	Metea Valley H.S.	Aurora, IL
C	44	Ryan Rosburg	6 ft 11 in (2.11 m)	245 lb (111 kg)	Sr	Marquette H.S.	Chesterfield, MO

Head coach

- Kim Anderson (Missouri)

Assistant coach(es)

- Corey Tate (Missouri)
- Brad Loos (Austin Peay)
- Rob Fulford (Marshall)

Legend

- (C) Team captain
- (S) Suspended
- (I) Ineligible
- (W) Walk-on
- Injured
- Current redshirt

Roster
Last update: 2015-05-11

== Schedule and results ==
Date time, TV	Opponent	Result	Record	High points	High rebounds	High assists	Site (attendance) city, state
Exhibition
11/06/2015*; 7:00 pm	Missouri Western	W 92–53	–	17 – Walton	8 – Gant	6 – Phillips	Mizzou Arena; Columbia, MO
Non-conference regular season
11/13/2015*; 7:00 pm	Wofford; CBE Hall of Fame Classic	W 83–74	1–0	20 – Puryear	7 – Wright	3 – Phillips	Mizzou Arena (5,037); Columbia, MO
11/15/2015*; 5:00 pm, SECN	Maryland Eastern Shore; CBE Hall of Fame Classic	W 73–55	2–0	15 – Clark	5 – Puryear, Wright	3 – Clark, Walton	Mizzou Arena (5,082); Columbia, MO
11/17/2015*; 5:30 pm, FS1	at Xavier	L 66–78	2–1	13 – Vanleer	5 – Puryear	3 – Clark	Cintas Center (9,751); Cincinnati, OH
11/23/2015*; 6:00 pm, ESPNU	vs. Kansas State; CBE Hall of Fame Classic semifinal	L 42–66	2–2	9 – Puryear	6 – Phillips	6 – Clark	Sprint Center (13,598); Kansas City, MO
11/24/2015*; 6:30 pm, ESPN3	vs. Northwestern; CBE Hall of Fame Classic consolation	L 62–67	2–3	16 – Phillips	9 – Rosburg	4 – Clark, Phillips	Sprint Center (13,198); Kansas City, MO
12/01/2015*; 8:00 pm, SECN	Arkansas State	W 88–78	3–3	14 – Wright	7 – Puryear	7 – Phillips	Mizzou Arena (5,104); Columbia, MO
12/04/2015*; 7:00 pm	Northern Illinois	W 78–71	4–3	17 – Puryear	7 – Clark, Rosburg	6 – Phillips	Mizzou Arena (6,214); Columbia, MO
12/09/2015*; 7:00 pm, SECN	Nebraska–Omaha	W 85–78	5–3	18 – Puryear	8 – Puryear	4 – Clark, Wright	Mizzou Arena (5,022); Columbia, MO
12/13/2015*; 7:00 pm, P12N	at No. 13 Arizona	L 52–88	5–4	9 – Wright	5 – Puryear, Wright	3 – Phillips	McKale Center (14,644); Tucson, AZ
12/19/2015*; 5:00 pm, SECN	NC State	L 59–73	5–5	12 – VanLeer	6 – Rosburg	3 – Clark, Walton	Mizzou Arena (8,087); Columbia, MO
12/23/2015*; 6:00 pm, ESPN2	vs. Illinois; Braggin' Rights	L 63–68	5–6	21 – Clark	10 – Woods	4 – Clark	Scottrade Center (14,456); St. Louis, MO
12/29/2015*; 8:00 pm	Arkansas–Pine Bluff	W 78–25	6–6	13 – Puryear	11 – Gant	5 – Phillips	Mizzou Arena (6,154); Columbia, MO
01/02/2016*; 2:00 pm	Savannah State	W 81–50	7–6	22 – Clark	8 – Wright	6 – Phillips	Mizzou Arena (6,037); Columbia, MO
SEC regular season
01/06/2016; 6:00 pm, SECN	at Georgia	L 59–77	7–7 (0–1)	19 – Puryear	6 – Gant	5 – Phillips	Stegeman Coliseum; Athens, GA
01/09/2016; 8:00 pm, ESPN2	Auburn	W 76–61	8–7 (1–1)	12 – Isabell	11 – Puryear	4 – Phillips	Mizzou Arena (6,533); Columbia, MO
01/12/2016; 8:00 pm, SECN	Arkansas	L 61–94	8–8 (1–2)	16 – Phillips	5 – Phillips	2 – Isabell	Mizzou Arena (6,627); Columbia, MO
01/16/2016; 12:00 pm, SECN	at South Carolina	L 72–81	8–9 (1–3)	26 – Clark	6 – Clark, Allen	8 – Clark	Colonial Life Arena (15,389); Columbia, SC
01/20/2016; 6:00 pm, SECN	Georgia	L 57–60	8–10 (1–4)	12 – Phillips, Wright	7 – Puryear	2 – Tied	Mizzou Arena (5,453); Columbia, MO
01/23/2016; 3:00 pm, SECN	at No. 10 Texas A&M	L 53–66	8–11 (1–5)	12 – Clark	9 – Clark	2 – Phillips, Clark, Wright, Walton	Reed Arena (12,198); College Station, TX
01/27/2016; 8:00 pm, SECN	at No. 20 Kentucky	L 54–88	8–12 (1–6)	11 – Clark	6 – Phillips, Walton	3 – Allen, Phillips	Rupp Arena (23,933); Lexington, KY
01/30/2016; 7:30 pm, SECN	Mississippi State	L 62–76	8–13 (1–7)	16 – Wright	9 – Wright	4 – Phillips	Mizzou Arena (7,175); Columbia, MO
02/03/2016; 8:00 pm, SECN	Ole Miss	L 73–76	8–14 (1–8)	20 – Clark	8 – Wright	5 – Clark	Mizzou Arena (4,734); Columbia, MO
02/06/2016; 2:00 pm, SECN	at Alabama	L 71–80	8–15 (1–9)	22 – Puryear	7 – Rosburg	3 – Clark, Phillips	Coleman Coliseum (15,383); Tuscaloosa, AL
02/10/2016; 8:00 pm, SECN	at Vanderbilt	L 71–86	8–16 (1–10)	24 – Rosburg	11 – Rosburg	6 – Clark	Memorial Gymnasium (10,006); Nashville, TN
02/13/2016; 2:00 pm, SECN	Tennessee	W 75–64	9–16 (2–10)	21 – Rosburg	7 – Phillips	5 – Phillips	Mizzou Arena (10,536); Columbia, MO
02/16/2016; 6:00 pm, SECN	South Carolina	W 72–67	10–16 (3–10)	18 – Rosburg	7 – Phillips, Wright	4 – Phillips	Mizzou Arena (5,017); Columbia, MO
02/20/2016; 6:30 pm, SECN	at Arkansas	L 72–84	10–17 (3–11)	23 – Puryear	12 – Wright	7 – Phillips	Bud Walton Arena (13,040); Fayetteville, AR
02/23/2016; 8:00 pm, SECN	at Ole Miss	L 76–85	10–18 (3–12)	20 – Wright	6 – Gant	4 – Walton	The Pavilion at Ole Miss (7,274); Oxford, MS
02/27/2016; 3:00 pm, ESPNU	No. 25 Texas A&M	L 69–84	10–19 (3–13)	17 – Isabell	10 – Phillips	5 – Isabell	Mizzou Arena (7,189); Columbia, MO
03/01/2016; 8:00 pm, SECN	at LSU	L 71–80	10–20 (3–14)	13 – 3 tied	8 – Wright	4 – Phillips	Maravich Center (9,652); Baton Rouge, LA
03/05/2016; 6:30 pm, SECN	Florida	L 72–82	10–21 (3–15)	19 – Wright	10 – Phillips	7 – Phillips	Mizzou Arena (7,013); Columbia, MO
*Non-conference game. ^{#}Rankings from AP Poll. (#) Tournament seedings in parentheses. All times are in Central Time.
