= 2015–16 Alabama Crimson Tide men's basketball team =

American college basketball season

2015–16 Alabama Crimson Tide men's basketball

NIT, First Round
- Conference: Southeastern Conference
- Record: 18–15 (8–10 SEC)
- Head coach: Avery Johnson (1st season)
- Assistant coaches: Antoine Pettway (4th season); Scott Pospichal (1st season); Bob Simon (1st season)
- Home arena: Coleman Coliseum (Capacity: 15,383)

2015–16 Southeastern Conference men's basketball standings
	Conf.				Overall
Team	W		L	PCT	W		L	PCT
No. 15 Texas A&M	13	–	5	.722	28	–	9	.757
No. 10 Kentucky †	13	–	5	.722	27	–	9	.750
South Carolina	11	–	7	.611	25	–	9	.735
Vanderbilt	11	–	7	.611	19	–	14	.576
LSU	11	–	7	.611	19	–	14	.576
Ole Miss	10	–	8	.556	20	–	12	.625
Georgia	10	–	8	.556	20	–	14	.588
Florida	9	–	9	.500	21	–	15	.583
Arkansas	9	–	9	.500	16	–	16	.500
Alabama	8	–	10	.444	18	–	15	.545
Mississippi State	7	–	11	.389	14	–	17	.452
Tennessee	6	–	12	.333	15	–	19	.441
Auburn	5	–	13	.278	11	–	20	.355
Missouri^{*}	3	–	15	.167	10	–	21	.323
† 2016 SEC tournament winner^{*}Ineligible for postseason play due to self-imposed postseason ban. Rankings from AP poll

The 2015–16 Alabama Crimson Tide men's basketball team (variously "Alabama", "UA", "Bama" or "The Tide") represented the University of Alabama in the 2015–16 NCAA Division I men's basketball season. The Crimson Tide played its home games at Coleman Coliseum in Tuscaloosa, Alabama, as a member of the Southeastern Conference. Avery Johnson was in his inaugural season as head coach of the team. He was hired on April 6, 2015, to replace Anthony Grant, who was fired on March 15 after serving as Alabama's head coach for six seasons. The team finished the season 18–15, 8–10 in SEC play to finish in 10th place. They defeated Ole Miss in the second round of the SEC tournament to advance to the quarterfinals where they lost to Kentucky. The Crimson Tide received an invitation to the National Invitation Tournament as a #5 seed, where the team lost to Creighton in the first round.

Johnson's hiring sparked an atmosphere of excitement that was evident the moment he was hired and lasted throughout the season. When he was introduced to the school on April 8, he promised that his basketball program would aspire to reach the Final Four, something an Alabama team has never accomplished; in fact, Alabama has only reached the Elite Eight once, in 2004. In stark contrast to Grant's quiet, unassuming demeanor, Johnson offered enthusiasm and pep throughout the summer months, attending numerous dinners, visiting football practices, and appearing on television, all to further promote the basketball program. This evidently paid off, as the 2015–16 season destroyed the school record for home attendance, with an average of 13,110 people at each game in the 15,383-seat Coleman Coliseum. The previous record average was 12,484. The coliseum also sold out five times for the first time since the 2006–07 season.

As for the season itself, the team shook off two early blowouts to make a splash on the national scene, upsetting two ranked teams in the AdvoCare Invitational. The Tide finished its non-conference schedule with nine wins and three losses, the same number of non-conference losses as the previous season. Coincidentally, just like the 2014–15 season, all three teams that the Crimson Tide lost to made the NCAA tournament. The team suffered an awful start to conference play, losing five of its first six games, although the one win did come against a ranked, undefeated South Carolina squad. Then Alabama surged, winning six of its next seven games to catapult into the NCAA Tournament conversation with five games remaining in the regular season. However, the Tide went 1–4 in those games to move itself off of the tournament bubble and into the bottom half of the middling SEC. One win in the SEC Tournament was enough to get Alabama an at-large NIT bid, but a blowout on the road at Creighton in the first round ended the season.

Redshirt senior guard Retin Obasohan was far and away the team's leader and biggest contributor during the season. After serving as nothing more than a role-player for his first three seasons playing at the Capstone, Obasohan was charged with the duties of team co-captain and senior leader after the graduation of starters Levi Randolph and Rodney Cooper from the prior season, and he was also eventually charged with filling the starting point guard role after a season-ending injury to freshman Dazon Ingram. Obasohan exceedingly fulfilled those responsibilities, upping his scoring average from 6.2 to 17.6 points per game and refining his defensive skills, while also serving as the driving force behind the team's emotion and energy. In recognition of his exceptional season, Obasohan was named to the All-SEC First Team and the All-SEC Defensive Team. He was also named the SEC Scholar-Athlete of the Year. Obasohan ended his career at UA ranked in the top ten of Alabama's career steals leaders, the top 20 of Alabama's single-season points leaders (for his 2015–16 season), and the top 40 of Alabama's career points leaders.

== Before the season ==
=== Previous season ===
Alabama finished the 2014–15 season with a 19–15 overall record (8–10 in the SEC) and an appearance in the National Invitation Tournament. The team started the season very strong, winning twelve of its first fifteen games, with all three losses coming against teams that went on to make the 2015 NCAA tournament. However, through the course of SEC play after those first fifteen games, the Tide faltered, developing an inability to put together consecutive wins—an issue that lasted for the rest of the season. As a result, Alabama suffered a losing home record in conference play for the first time since 1969. The team finished the season tied for eighth place in the SEC standings and was awarded the #9 seed and a first-round bye in the SEC tournament. In the second round, the Crimson Tide was eliminated, falling to the eighth-seeded Florida Gators 69–61. In the postseason, the team was selected to play in the NIT as a #6 seed. Alabama routed #3 seed Illinois 79–58 in the first round, but lost to #2 seed Miami 73–66 in the second round to end the Tide's season.

=== Coaching changes ===
On March 15, three days after Alabama's loss to Florida in the SEC Tournament, UA athletic director Bill Battle released a statement announcing that Anthony Grant would not be retained as the head coach thereafter, presumably due to major fan dissatisfaction with the consistently mediocre seasons his teams produced, as evidenced by declining home attendance numbers. Later that day, Alabama received its invitation to the NIT. Stuck without a head coach, the school named assistant coach John Brannen as the interim head coach for the tournament.

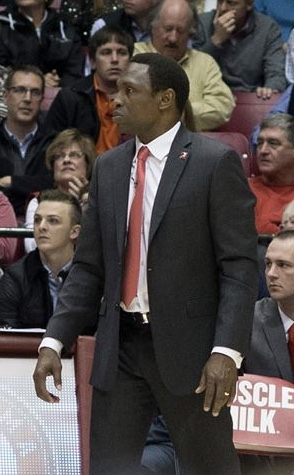
The 2015–16 season was Avery Johnson's first at Alabama.

Following the conclusion of Alabama's season on March 21, Battle began intensively searching for a replacement for Grant. Early rumors indicated that Indiana head coach Tom Crean and then-Murray State head coach Steve Prohm (who attended Alabama) were Battle's biggest targets. However, over the next several days, those names gave way to that of Wichita State's Gregg Marshall, and it was reported on March 23 that Alabama was prepared to offer Marshall a contract in excess of $3 million per year. Then, on April 1, reports indicated that Marshall would soon visit Tuscaloosa with his family while pondering whether or not to take the Alabama job; however, later that day, it was confirmed that he had decided to stay at Wichita State.

In an unusual move, Battle addressed Marshall's decision to remain at Wichita State in a public statement. With his first option ruled out, Battle contacted former National Basketball Association player and coach Avery Johnson, who expressed considerable interest in the job. Johnson had not been a coach since 2012, and had never coached at the collegiate level (having only been the head coach of the NBA's Dallas Mavericks and New Jersey/Brooklyn Nets). Despite that, Battle quickly arranged to meet with Johnson and his family and hired him shortly afterward on April 6. It was later reported that at the time of his meeting with Battle, Johnson was just days away from signing a contract extension as an analyst with ESPN. He was formally introduced as the new Alabama head coach on April 8.

Johnson subsequently hired two assistant coaches, while retaining former Alabama player Antoine Pettway as an assistant coach for his fifth year with the program and Lou DeNeen as the strength and conditioning coach for his third year with the program. On April 20, he hired Providence assistant coach Bob Simon as his associate head coach, and then on June 4, he hired "legendary" AAU coach Scott Pospichal as a third assistant.

=== Roster changes ===
==== Departures ====
Following the firing of Grant, four players left the team, with three of them electing to transfer to other schools. Additionally, two seniors graduated and signed with professional teams, while another chose to continue his collegiate career as a graduate student at a different school.

Name	Number	Pos.	Height	Weight	Year	Home town	Notes
Ricky Tarrant	2	G	6'2"	190	Junior	Pleasant Grove, Alabama	Transferred to Memphis.
Jeff Garrett	4	F	6'7"	206	Freshman	Gadsden, Alabama	Transferred to Northern Kentucky. He redshirted during his only season at Alabama.
Levi Randolph	20	G	6'5"	208	Senior	Madison, Alabama	Graduated; went undrafted in the NBA draft and subsequently signed with the Boston Celtics.
Rodney Cooper	21	F	6'6"	218	Senior	Hurtsboro, Alabama	Graduated; went undrafted in the NBA draft and subsequently signed with Soproni KC in Sopron, Hungary.
Devin Mitchell	23	G	6'4"	182	Freshman	Suwanee, Georgia	Transferred to Georgia State.
Dakota Slaughter	35	F	6'6"	220	Senior	Fishers, Indiana	Graduated; elected to play his final year of eligibility as a graduate transfer at Texas–Rio Grande Valley.
John Gibson	41	F	6'7"	220	Sophomore	Marietta, Georgia	Left the team for undisclosed reasons. He was a walk-on at Alabama after transferring from Xavier (La.).

==== Class of 2015 signees ====
College recruiting
Name	Hometown	School	Height	Weight	Commit date
Brandon Austin; SF	Montgomery, Alabama	Carver High School	6 ft 5 in (1.96 m)	180 lb (82 kg)	Aug 18, 2013
Brandon Austin; SF	Recruit ratings: Scout: Rivals: 247Sports: ESPN: (79)				
Kobie Eubanks*; SG	Fort Lauderdale, Florida	Our Savior New American School	6 ft 5 in (1.96 m)	206 lb (93 kg)	Jun 22, 2015
Kobie Eubanks*; SG	Recruit ratings: Scout: Rivals: 247Sports: ESPN: (80)				
Donta Hall†; PF	Luverne, Alabama	Luverne High School	6 ft 8 in (2.03 m)	208 lb (94 kg)	Apr 24, 2014
Donta Hall†; PF	Recruit ratings: Scout: Rivals: 247Sports: ESPN: (83)				
Dazon Ingram; SG	Theodore, Alabama	Theodore High School	6 ft 4.5 in (1.94 m)	184 lb (83 kg)	Apr 17, 2015
Dazon Ingram; SG	Recruit ratings: Scout: Rivals: 247Sports: ESPN: (80)				
Overall recruit ranking: Scout: NR Rivals: NR 247Sports: 68 ESPN: NR
Note: In many cases, Scout, Rivals, 247Sports, On3, and ESPN may conflict in their listings of height and weight.; In these cases, the average was taken. ESPN grades are on a 100-point scale.; Sources: "Alabama 2015 Basketball Commitments". Rivals.; "2015 Alabama Basketball Commits". Scout.; "ESPN". ESPN.; "Scout.com Team Recruiting Rankings". Scout.; "2015 Team Ranking". Rivals.

• Lawson Schaffer, a 5-foot-11 point guard from Cullman High School in Cullman, Alabama, announced on April 30, 2015, that he would walk on at Alabama as part of the class of 2015. He was not rated by Scout, Rivals, 247Sports, or ESPN.

*Although Eubanks was considered part of Alabama's 2015 signing class, he was deemed academically ineligible in August 2015 by the NCAA Clearinghouse and consequently did not enroll at the university. He eventually enrolled at Texas A&M in December 2015.
†The spelling and punctuation of Hall's first name ("Donta", "Donta′", "Danta", and "Danta′") varies among recruiting sites, news articles, and Alabama's official roster. The spelling and punctuation found on Alabama's official roster was used in this article.

==== Other additions ====
Following the hiring of Johnson, Alabama added to its roster four players not part of the class of 2015: a former national Top 50 recruit, junior Nick King; Johnson's son, sophomore Avery Johnson Jr.; graduate transfer Arthur Edwards; and sophomore walk-on Christian Clark.

Name	Number	Pos.	Height	Weight	Year	Home town	Notes
Nick King	0	F	6'7"	220	Junior	Memphis, Tennessee	Transferred from Memphis with two years of eligibility remaining. In accordance with NCAA Division I transfer rules, he was required to sit out the 2015–16 season.
Arthur Edwards	4	G	6'6"	210	Graduate student	Washington, D.C.	Transferred from New Mexico with one year of eligibility remaining. Since he has already graduated from college and is attending graduate school at Alabama, he was able to play immediately, as per NCAA Division I transfer rules.
Avery Johnson Jr.	13	G	5'11"	180	Sophomore	Houston, Texas	Transferred from Texas A&M with three years of eligibility remaining. In accordance with NCAA Division I transfer rules, he was required to sit out the 2015–16 season.
Christian Clark	24	F	6'5"	210	Sophomore	Chester, Virginia	He was officially added to the roster in the summer of 2015 with three years of eligibility remaining after joining the team as a walk-on prior to the previous season, but only dressing out for ten games during the season.

== Roster ==
2015–16 Alabama Crimson Tide men's basketball team
Players
Coaches

Pos.	#	Name	Height	Weight	Year	Previous school	Hometown
G/F	0	Nick King (redshirt)	6 ft 7 in (2.01 m)	225 lb (102 kg)	Jr	University of Memphis	Memphis, Tennessee
G/F	1	Riley Norris	6 ft 7 in (2.01 m)	203 lb (92 kg)	So	Albertville High School	Albertville, Alabama
G	2	Lawson Schaffer (W)	5 ft 11 in (1.8 m)	160 lb (73 kg)	Fr	Cullman High School	Cullman, Alabama
F	3	Michael Kessens	6 ft 9 in (2.06 m)	228 lb (103 kg)	Jr	Longwood University	Nyon, Switzerland
G	4	Arthur Edwards	6 ft 6 in (1.98 m)	217 lb (98 kg)	GS	University of New Mexico	Washington, D.C.
G	5	Justin Coleman	5 ft 10 in (1.78 m)	168 lb (76 kg)	So	Wenonah High School	Birmingham, Alabama
F	10	Jimmie Taylor (C)	6 ft 10 in (2.08 m)	248 lb (112 kg)	Jr	Greensboro High School	Greensboro, Alabama
F	11	Shannon Hale	6 ft 8 in (2.03 m)	233 lb (106 kg)	Jr	Christ School	Johnson City, Tennessee
G	12	Dazon Ingram (injured) (redshirt)	6 ft 5 in (1.96 m)	205 lb (93 kg)	Fr	Theodore High School	Theodore, Alabama
G	13	Avery Johnson Jr. (redshirt)	5 ft 11 in (1.8 m)	187 lb (85 kg)	So	Texas A&M University	Houston, Texas
G	23	Brandon Austin	6 ft 5 in (1.96 m)	197 lb (89 kg)	Fr	Carver High School	Montgomery, Alabama
F	24	Christian Clark (W)	6 ft 6 in (1.98 m)	210 lb (95 kg)	So	Thomas Dale High School	Chester, Virginia
G	32	Retin Obasohan (C)	6 ft 2 in (1.88 m)	210 lb (95 kg)	RS Sr	K.A. Redingenhof	Antwerp, Belgium
F	35	Donta Hall	6 ft 9 in (2.06 m)	224 lb (102 kg)	Fr	Luverne High School	Luverne, Alabama

Head coach

- Avery Johnson (Southern)

Assistant coach(es)

- Antoine Pettway (Alabama)
- Scott Pospichal (Florida Southern)
- Bob Simon (Eastern Michigan)

Strength and conditioning coach(es)

- Lou DeNeen (South Florida)

Legend

- (C) Team captain
- (S) Suspended
- (I) Ineligible
- (W) Walk-on
- Injured
- Current redshirt

Roster
Last update: January 30, 2016

=== Depth chart ===
Pos.	Starting 5	Bench 1	Bench 2	Bench 3
C	Jimmie Taylor	Donta Hall
PF	Michael Kessens	Shannon Hale
SF	Riley Norris	Christian Clark
SG	Arthur Edwards	Brandon Austin
PG	Retin Obasohan	Justin Coleman	Lawson Schaffer	Dazon Ingram (inj.)

== Season ==
On August 5, the school announced that the student section in Coleman Coliseum would be shifted over two sections to the side and corner of the court opposite the visiting team's bench in an attempt to enhance the home-court advantage in the coliseum and to make the students more visible on television and closer to the court. The student section was previously directly behind the goal next to the visiting team's bench. To complement that change, the area where television cameras are set up was moved to the opposite side of the coliseum and the court was repainted so it would not appear upside down on television broadcasts.

Alabama released its full non-conference schedule, consisting of twelve regular season games and one exhibition game, on August 10. The full conference slate was released by the SEC for all of its member schools on August 19. Alabama played eighteen SEC games for a total of thirty regular season games overall.

The team held its first official full team practice on October 2.

On October 21, members of the SEC media voted the Crimson Tide to finish 13th in the end-of-season SEC standings, ahead of only Missouri. In the end, Alabama finished three spots higher in tenth place.

On October 27, the entire team, along with the women's basketball team, was introduced to students, faculty, and season ticket holders at the "Tide Tipoff" at Coleman Coliseum, which included a three-point contest, a dunk contest, and a performance from hip hop duo Rae Sremmurd.

Alabama announced on December 10 that freshman point guard Dazon Ingram had suffered a fractured left foot in practice two days prior and would miss the remainder of the season following surgery. Ingram started the first seven games for the Crimson Tide, and at the time of his injury, he led the team in rebounding and assists averages. He was eligible for a medical redshirt and returned for the 2016–17 season with four years of eligibility.

Junior forward and starter Shannon Hale missed three games from December 16 to December 29 due to an ambiguously-referenced "medical condition". He returned in a backup role on January 2 to play limited minutes in Alabama's win over Norfolk State. He returned to a starting role on January 23 versus LSU.

Sophomore guard Justin Coleman saw his playing time suddenly drop for a period from January 23 to February 2 due to a nagging turf toe injury that he aggravated in practice. Although he did not start, he returned to being a big contributor for the team in the February 2 game against Mississippi State, seemingly unbothered by the injury despite being listed as a "game-time decision".

Injuries continued to pile up on Alabama during SEC play as Hale missed the February 2 Mississippi State game with a foot injury suffered in the January 30 game at South Carolina. Additionally, junior forward Michael Kessens was forced to exit the MSU game with a knee injury. Kessens returned the next game, while Hale missed one more game before returning on February 10 against Texas A&M. The team managed to avoid any more major injuries thereafter, although it is notable to point out that Kessens started in place of Hale in every game after February 2.

The regular season ended on March 5, at which point Alabama was assigned the #10 seed in the SEC tournament, resulting in a first-round bye for the Tide.

In reference to a quote made by head coach Avery Johnson in his introductory press conference on April 8, the unofficial slogan of the team's season was "#BuckleUp". The school embraced this, including it in Tweets by the team's official Twitter account and on props given to students at basketball games.

=== Game summaries ===
==== Non-conference play ====
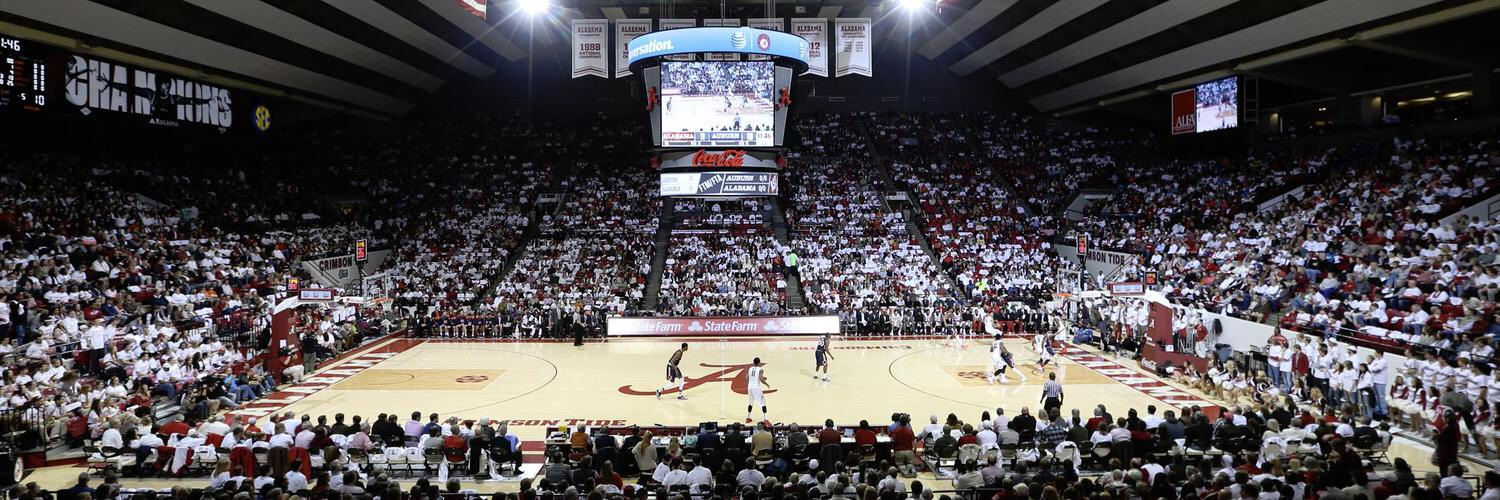
Alabama played all but one of its home games at Coleman Coliseum.

Alabama kicked off the season with a home exhibition game against the Division II Trevecca Nazarene Trojans on November 6, which the Crimson Tide won handily, 87–65. The regular season began on November 13 in Tuscaloosa with a 77–64 win over Kennesaw State in front of 14,970 fans, the most at an Alabama home opener since 1989. Freshman guard Dazon Ingram filled the stat sheet with 16 points, six rebounds, four assists and two steals in his first true game in an Alabama uniform. Senior guard Retin Obasohan also emerged as a potential leader for the Tide, contributing 18 points and three steals. This game marked Avery Johnson's official head coaching debut with Alabama, as well as his collegiate coaching debut in general. Alabama then took a trip to Dayton, Ohio, to face the Dayton Flyers as part of ESPN's College Hoops Tip-Off Marathon. Despite a competitive start, the Tide suffered a poor overall shooting performance against the Flyers' stout defense and got obliterated, 80–48. No Alabama player exceeded nine points. The 32-point margin of defeat marked the worst Alabama loss since a 2001 game against Ole Miss.

After the embarrassing loss, Alabama returned to friendlier confines to win a 105–93 shootout over Louisiana–Lafayette in which the Crimson Tide displayed a much-improved shooting proficiency with six players reaching double-digit point totals. The team hit fifteen three-pointers and scored the most points by an Alabama team in a game since 2005. Sophomore guard Justin Coleman, junior forward Shannon Hale, and sophomore forward Riley Norris all scored a team-high 18 points for the Tide. With a bounce-back win in its pocket, Alabama next headed to the ESPN Wide World of Sports Complex in Orlando for the AdvoCare Invitational, where in the first round the team faced #23 Xavier. Ultimately, the Crimson Tide fell to the clearly more-talented Musketeers, 64–45, in a game very similar to the Dayton game. Alabama played a competitive first half and trailed by only three at halftime, but poor second-half shooting allowed the Musketeers to pull away. Like the Dayton game, the Tide once again failed to find a reliable scoring option, with Hale and Coleman being the top contributors with only ten points apiece. This was Alabama's third loss to Xavier in as many seasons. However, the Tide bounced back in a huge way, knocking off 20th-ranked (albeit shorthanded) Wichita State 64–60 the very next day in the consolation game for the school's first win versus a ranked opponent since the 2010–11 season. A Norris three-pointer off of an offensive rebound with just under six minutes to play gave Alabama the lead for good. Alabama matched the number of field goals made from the previous game (17), but did so in thirteen fewer attempts. Two days later, the team pulled off an even bigger upset, this time over #17 Notre Dame in the fifth-place game. Retin Obasohan contorted his body to get the go-ahead game-winning layup with eight seconds remaining in the 74–73 win; he finished with 19 points and five assists. In the final minutes of the game, Alabama had to endure two starters—Dazon Ingram and junior forward Jimmie Taylor—fouling out. Alabama had not beaten back-to-back ranked opponents since 2006. With the win, the Crimson Tide placed fifth in the AdvoCare Invitational.

The Tide continued its non-conference slate by heading to Hattiesburg, Mississippi, to play Southern Miss, where the team staggered its way to a 58–55 win over the then-winless Golden Eagles for the Crimson Tide's first true road win of the season. Alabama put together a 19–4 second-half scoring run to take a ten-point lead, but USM fought back. Over the final seven minutes, the Golden Eagles whittled the lead down to three and had an opportunity to force overtime with two three-point attempts in the last seconds, but both missed and Alabama survived. After taking a crucial blow by losing Dazon Ingram for the rest of the season due to injury, Alabama trudged on, traveling to Greenville, South Carolina, to face the Clemson Tigers. The Crimson Tide held a single-digit lead for most of the game until Clemson took advantage of an Alabama scoring drought to take a 50–49 lead with under a minute to play. But with 29 seconds left, Alabama's Shannon Hale stole a Clemson inbounds pass and broke away for an easy dunk to give the Tide the lead for good in the 51–50 win, its fourth straight away from home. After going 4–1 (and 2–1 versus ranked teams) on its longest road trip since the 2000–01 season, Alabama returned home for a December 16 matchup with Winthrop. With Hale, a starter, out due to a medical condition, the Tide used a dominant second half and a double-double from Jimmie Taylor to soundly beat the Eagles 72–60. Justin Coleman matched a season-high with 18 points. Two late 7–0 Winthrop scoring runs cut down an Alabama lead that inflated to as much as 23 points in the second half.

In the last major game of Alabama's non-conference schedule, the Crimson Tide hosted Oregon at the Birmingham–Jefferson Convention Complex (BJCC). This was the first time Alabama had played in Birmingham since a game against Oklahoma State at the BJCC during the 2011–12 season, which the Tide won. This time, however, the team came up just short. Following the narrative of its previous two losses, Alabama played an outstanding first half with great shooting and led 38–26 at the break, but Oregon's shooters got hot in the second half and held on to an early second-half lead to beat the Tide 72–68. Justin Coleman, back in his hometown of Birmingham, lit up the BJCC with a career-high 24 points on seven made field goals and six free throws to keep Alabama in the game. Riley Norris had a chance to tie the game at 68 in the final minute, but his three-pointer was off the mark; Oregon followed that with two free throws. Although Alabama senior guard Arthur Edwards nailed a three-pointer with six seconds remaining, Oregon hit two more free throws to put the game out of reach. The Crimson Tide then returned to Tuscaloosa to take on a scrappy Jacksonville State squad. Alabama head coach Avery Johnson said after the game that he had been "really concerned" about the game in the days leading up to it. His concerns held true, as the Gamecocks overcame a thirteen-point deficit in the second half (after leading by two at halftime) to tie the game at 55 late in regulation. Retin Obasohan had a chance to win it for Alabama with two free-throw attempts with 2.3 seconds left, but he missed both, leading to overtime. However, the Tide managed to take over in overtime and won the game 67–59. Alabama then capped off its non-conference slate against Norfolk State, using some sharp shooting from Obasohan and Edwards to aid in a 68–49 blowout win. Obasohan scored 23 on 9-of-12 field-goal shooting, while Edwards added 15 from five three-pointers on nine attempts. Some of Alabama's players stated that the near-collapse in the JSU game caught the team's attention and that the players' focus and accuracy in the blowout of Norfolk State could be attributed to that. Shannon Hale returned to the team for this game for his first playing time since the Clemson game.

==== Conference play ====
Throughout the course of the conference regular season, Alabama faced all thirteen fellow SEC members, playing five of them twice. Three of those five teams—Auburn, LSU, and Mississippi State—are Alabama's permanent "rivals", in a sense, in that Alabama faces those three teams twice every season, a practice that started with the 2015–16 season.

Alabama opened its SEC schedule against Ole Miss at the Rebels' new arena, The Pavilion at Ole Miss. This was Ole Miss's debut game there after having played its home games in Tad Smith Coliseum for nearly 50 years, and it predictably attracted a capacity crowd of 9,500 people. Alabama fell victim to early foul trouble for its post players, particularly starter Jimmie Taylor, and blew an eight-point halftime lead, losing the game 74–66. Retin Obasohan burst onto the SEC scene in this game, matching a career-high with 23 points, while also adding six rebounds, four assists, and three steals. However, the Crimson Tide's second-half offense could not keep up with the Rebels, producing only 26 points on nine field goals made. Two days later, the Tide played an even tougher opponent in #9 Kentucky, this time at home in front of another sellout crowd. Despite a third-straight performance from Obasohan with 20 or more points, Kentucky enjoyed a career-best 25 points from senior forward Alex Poythress and a massive +18 team rebounding margin en route to a 77–61 blowout victory over the Crimson Tide. After the game, Wildcats head coach John Calipari was quoted as saying "that's as good as we play". However, Alabama's confidence evidently did not waver despite opening SEC play with an 0–2 record, because in its next game against 19th-ranked and 15–0 South Carolina (which, along with SMU, represented the only remaining undefeated Division I teams), the Tide attacked the Gamecocks early and often. Alabama turned a 19–4 start and a 35–22 halftime lead into a 73–50 onslaught to give South Carolina its first loss of the season and head coach Avery Johnson his first ever SEC win. Riley Norris tied a school record for most made three-pointers, going 8-for-11 from long range, and finished with a career-high 27 points.

Alabama then began a two-game road trip in Nashville at Vanderbilt. Horrid free-throw shooting by Alabama (7/20; 35%) and hot three-point shooting by Vandy (9/16; 56%) resulted in a convincing 71–63 win for the Commodores. With the win, Vanderbilt took a 68–67 lead in the all-time series. To close out the short road trip, the Crimson Tide headed south to visit Auburn for the Iron Bowl of Basketball. Retin Obasohan came up big for the team once again, contributing a career-high 27 points along with six rebounds, but Auburn junior guard Kareem Canty seemingly couldn't miss, going 5-for-8 from the three-point line and finishing with 25 points as the Tigers held on to a slim halftime lead to win, 83–77, in the first of two editions of the rivalry for the season. With the team bereft of any semblance of momentum, having lost four of its last five games, Alabama returned home for a huge matchup against spectacular freshman forward Ben Simmons and the LSU Tigers. The game was back-and-forth throughout its duration, with the largest lead of the whole game being eight points. After a Tim Quarterman layup gave LSU a two-point lead with 32 seconds to go, Alabama was unable to get a quality shot off before the buzzer, resulting in a 72–70 win for the Tigers. Simmons shined, racking up 23 points and eight boards despite foul trouble late in the game. Obasohan led Alabama with 20 points and Riley Norris notched a double-double.

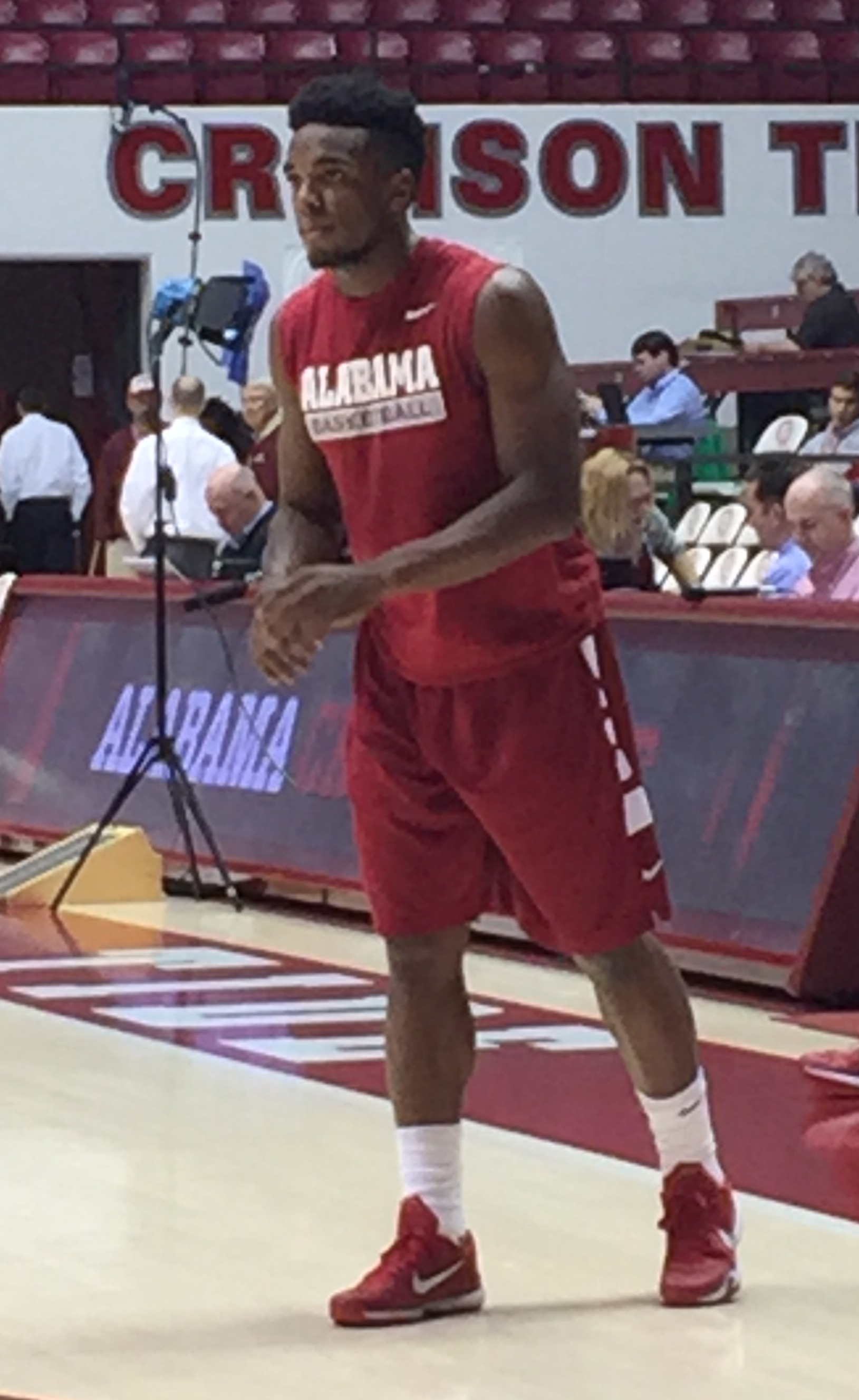
Retin Obasohan has clearly been the team's leader this season, averaging a team-high 17.7 points per game.

The demoralizing effects of the loss to LSU were evident throughout the majority of the Crimson Tide's next game, when the team hosted the Tennessee Volunteers. Alabama mustered only four points in the first ten minutes of the game, and eventually the team found itself down by fifteen to the Vols with fourteen minutes to go in the game. Then, Retin Obasohan and Shannon Hale took over; Obasohan (22 points) made multiple driving layups and a high-flying dunk while Hale (20 points) converted nine of ten free throws and a dunk of his own, powering a fierce Tide comeback. With the game tied at 57 with less than a minute to go, Arthur Edwards swished a three-pointer to take the lead, and off of a steal Obasohan converted a layup while being fouled and made the ensuing free throw to seal the comeback win, 63–57. The win snapped a three-game losing skid, the longest of the season. In its following game, Alabama took on South Carolina in Columbia in an attempt to complete a two-game season sweep of the Gamecocks. In just the seventh sellout in Colonial Life Arena history, South Carolina took advantage of a foul advantage of 30–19 (which resulted in four Alabama players, including two starters, fouling out) as well as a whopping 20 offensive rebounds to outmuscle the Tide in a 78–64 Gamecock revenge win. Yet again, Obasohan proved his worth as the only true consistent leader on Alabama's team, at one point scoring 16 straight points for the Crimson Tide in the second half despite being burdened with four fouls during that entire stretch. He ended with 23 points and was eventually disqualified on a technical foul after the game was out of reach.

Alabama next faced the surging Bulldogs of Mississippi State at Humphrey Coliseum. The Crimson Tide was very hampered by injuries, inherently missing Dazon Ingram while also missing starter Shannon Hale due to injury and losing junior forward Michael Kessens (who started in place of Hale) to an injury during the game. The game was a close one throughout, and a clutch, acrobatic running jumper by Retin Obasohan with about a minute left in regulation tied the game at 67, ultimately forcing overtime. In OT, Justin Coleman's seven points helped lead the Tide to an 82–80 win. Obasohan continued his all-SEC-caliber style of play, finishing with 25 points (his fifth-straight game with at least 20 points) and a career-high eight assists. The team followed that victory with an easy 80–71 win over a struggling Missouri squad. Five Tide players scored in double figures, Coleman Coliseum sold out for the third time of the season, and the win, coupled with the victory at MSU, signified back-to-back SEC wins for Alabama for the first time in nearly three years. Having built a little bit of momentum, the Crimson Tide turned to a major home game against #15 Texas A&M, who entered the game on a three-game SEC losing streak after starting 7–0 in the league. Alabama enjoyed nice contributions from essentially every scholarship player, including 16 points from Obasohan and a career-high ten rebounds from freshman forward Donta Hall, and the Tide held on for a thrilling 63–62 win over the Aggies. Anthony Collins, the SEC's leading free-throw shooter at the time, missed two potentially game-tying free throws for A&M with 2.3 seconds remaining in the game. This game marked Alabama's fourth win over a ranked team, a feat the school had not accomplished since the 2001–02 season. Hale returned from a two-game hiatus due to injury to play in this game, scoring ten points off the bench.

Alabama then hit the road to take on a talented Florida Gators squad. The Gators came in as a near-double-digit point favorite and led at the half, 27–23, with both teams having trouble making shots in the first half. In the second half, Alabama surged, eventually taking a two-point lead on a three-point play by Retin Obasohan with 8:50 to go. However, about three minutes later, with the Crimson Tide up 48–44, Obasohan and Arthur Edwards, both starters, were called for their fifth fouls and were forced to exit the game, leaving the Tide without its entire starting backcourt. Then Jimmie Taylor sprung into action, swatting Florida's shots and drilling thunderous dunks. Because of his efforts, Alabama never trailed for the rest of the game and left the O'Connell Center with a huge 61–55 victory. Taylor finished with eleven points, five blocks, and four rebounds in 27 minutes of work. The win was Alabama's first at Florida since 1995, snapping a ten-game losing streak in Gainesville as well as an eleven-game losing streak to the Gators in general. The Tide, which had by then propelled itself firmly into the NCAA tournament conversation, attempted to continue its incredible surge at LSU. The Tigers held a 36–31 halftime lead after Alabama struggled to make some open first-half shots, but Obasohan turned it on in the latter half, exploding for 23 second-half points and finishing with a career high 35 points, and Alabama left Baton Rouge with a crucial 76–69 win, further padding its tournament résumé. Justin Coleman contributed 21 points and Riley Norris grabbed a career-high 16 rebounds to assist Obasohan in leading the team to victory. The win was Alabama's fifth straight in the SEC, which marked the first time an Alabama team had done that since the 2010–11 season.

The team then tried to extend its win streak to six against Mississippi State in Tuscaloosa. The Bulldogs, fresh off of a thrilling last-second home win over Vanderbilt, challenged Alabama the whole game, making contested shots time and time again to maintain a small lead. Mississippi State was ahead by three at the half, and in the second half, the team answered with a big shot every time Alabama made a push for the lead. With 22 seconds left, MSU junior guard I. J. Ready sank a midrange jump shot to put the game away, and Mississippi State won 67–61. The Crimson Tide's offense was anemic aside from the play of Retin Obasohan, Shannon Hale, and Jimmie Taylor, who combined to account for 85 percent of Alabama's points. With its momentum having taken a major hit and its NCAA tournament potential in question, Alabama made a quick turnaround and went back on the road to visit #16 Kentucky to complete the season series with the Wildcats. Four and a half minutes into the game, Alabama trailed only 9–7, but then the team suffered a massive scoring drought, going 1-for-16 from the field for a long stretch before hitting two shots right before halftime. The Cats continued to build on a twelve-point halftime lead in the second half and eventually won 78–53. Sophomore guard Tyler Ulis was outstanding for Kentucky, recording 19 points and ten assists. Conversely, Alabama's offense was downright lethargic, relying on Obasohan's 29 points to stay remotely competitive in the game.

To begin the final stretch of the regular season, the Crimson Tide returned home to try to avenge the loss at Auburn from earlier in the season. In front of the fifth and final Coleman Coliseum sellout crowd of the season, Alabama overcame a 17/29 free-throw shooting performance, a ten-point deficit in the second half, and a double-double from Auburn senior forward Cinmeon Bowers to escape with a 65–57 win. Multiple dunks by Donta Hall (who finished with a career-high ten points) and Michael Kessens fueled the energy for the team, and a block of Bowers's shot by Retin Obasohan with less than a minute to go allowed the Crimson Tide to pull away at the free throw line for the win. The game displayed a great deal of physicality, with 47 total fouls being called on the teams. Alabama's next game came against Arkansas, and since it was Alabama's last home game of the regular season, it served as senior night for Obasohan and Arthur Edwards. The Tide played yet another close game throughout and found itself behind for most of the second half, eventually trailing by two with 13.4 seconds left and with possession of the ball. Obasohan and Justin Coleman both missed shots on the possession, and Arkansas hit two ensuing free throws to put the game out of reach, winning 62–61. Obasohan gave another incredible performance for his senior night, scoring 32. The game all but eliminated the Crimson Tide from NCAA Tournament contention. To close out the regular season, Alabama visited Georgia. A +22 rebounding advantage for the Bulldogs allowed Georgia to maintain a small lead for most of the game, and Georgia's J. J. Frazier made all eight of his free-throw attempts in the last minute of the game to help the Bulldogs finish the season with a 70–63 victory over the Crimson Tide. In a rare occurrence, Obasohan did not lead the team in scoring; Shannon Hale did with 25 points. After the game, Georgia head coach Mark Fox campaigned for Alabama to be selected to play in the NCAA Tournament, stating, "They're a tournament-worthy team and their kids deserve the opportunity based on the schedule they played."

==== SEC Tournament ====
After the conclusion of the final SEC game on Saturday, March 5, the seedings for the SEC tournament were set. The tournament was held at Bridgestone Arena in Nashville. Alabama received a first-round bye and the #10 seed in the tournament. In the Crimson Tide's first tournament game, the team was matched up with #7 seed Ole Miss in the second round. The Rebels jumped out to an early lead as Retin Obasohan endured early foul trouble, picking up his second foul less than five minutes into the game. Obasohan spent most of the half on the bench and recorded no points. Alabama held a small lead for most of the half as the two teams traded shots and headed to the locker rooms with the Crimson Tide leading 40–36. Then, in the second half, three-pointers by Obasohan, Riley Norris, and Arthur Edwards gave the Tide a 53–44 lead with fifteen minutes to play. From that point on, Alabama cruised, with its lead never falling below five points and at one point reaching fourteen. Alabama advanced to the quarterfinals with an 81–73 victory. Ole Miss senior guard Stefan Moody scored 39 points in the game, which tied for the second-most in SEC tournament history. Alabama had some star shooters of its own, with Obasohan leading the team with 17 points—all scored in the second half—and Norris, Edwards, and Justin Coleman also contributing at least 15 points apiece.

In the SEC quarterfinals, Alabama faced #2 seed Kentucky for the third time of the season. Despite another slow start by Retin Obasohan, the Crimson Tide only trailed by three after over ten minutes of play. But then the Tide suffered a drought that lasted five and a half minutes to allow UK to take an eight-point lead, which the Wildcats eventually extended to ten by halftime. After the half, Kentucky came out on fire from long range, and a 13–2 run gave the Wildcats a double-digit lead that the team would not relinquish. As Kentucky continued to drain three-pointers and Alabama continued to struggle shooting, the lead stretched to 26 and the Crimson Tide was eliminated from the SEC Tournament by a score of 85–59. Arthur Edwards built on 14 first-half points to finish the game with 20. Kentucky shot 59% from three-point range to quell any hope for a second-half Tide comeback. With only one win in the SEC Tournament and sitting only four games above a .500 winning percentage at 18–14, Alabama was essentially locked out of the NCAA Tournament.

==== National Invitation Tournament ====
Alabama was not selected to play in the NCAA tournament, but the team did earn and accept a bid to play in the National Invitation Tournament as a #5 seed. The team was paired with #4 seed Creighton, which had also finished the regular season with an 18–14 record after going 9–9 in the Big East and finishing sixth in the conference. Since Creighton was the higher seed, the game was played in Omaha, Nebraska, at Creighton's home arena, CenturyLink Center Omaha.

=== Statistics and rankings ===
The team holds an 18–13 record (8–10 in conference play), with a 10–5 record at home, a 5–7 record on the road, and a 3–1 record at neutral sites. The team also owns a 4–3 record against teams that were ranked when Alabama played them. Retin Obasohan leads the team in scoring average at 17.7 points per game, Riley Norris leads all active players with 5.4 rebounds per game, and Justin Coleman leads the team in assists at 3.5 per game. Additionally, Jimmie Taylor ranks 53rd-best in the country in blocks per game at an average of 1.9, while Coleman ranks sixth-best in the country in free-throw percentage, having made 71 of his 79 attempts, which is good for 89.9%. Alabama is averaging a meager 67.0 points per game, while allowing an average of 67.1 points scored by its opponents. The team is 13–3 when holding opponents under 70 points, and 5–10 otherwise. According to NCAA.com, Alabama's RPI résumé is the 75th-best in the country and the seventh-best in the SEC, while according to ESPN, its strength of schedule ranks 30th-highest in the country and third-highest in the conference. The Crimson Tide did not receive any votes in the AP or Coaches Polls.

==== Combined team statistics ====
Name	GP	GS	Min	Avg	FG	FGA	FG%	3Pt	3PtA	3Pt%	FT	FTA	FT%	OR	DR	Reb	Avg	PF	DQ	Ast	TO	Blk	Stl	Pts	Avg
Brandon Austin	30	0	268	8.9	18	59	0.305	8	40	0.200	2	4	0.500	7	20	27	0.9	17	0	2	6	4	3	46	1.5
Christian Clark	9	0	13	1.4	0	1	0.000	0	0	0.000	0	0	0.000	2	0	2	0.2	1	0	0	2	0	0	0	0.0
Justin Coleman	33	7	866	26.2	73	243	0.300	40	147	0.272	73	82	0.890	8	57	65	2.0	47	0	110	65	0	23	259	7.8
Arthur Edwards	33	33	945	28.6	107	259	0.413	71	180	0.394	27	41	0.659	18	106	124	3.8	83	3	47	62	15	26	312	9.5
Shannon Hale	28	12	688	24.6	95	257	0.370	43	131	0.328	68	91	0.747	24	56	80	2.9	64	2	14	58	7	13	301	10.8
Donta Hall	33	0	421	12.8	37	61	0.607	0	0	0.000	19	44	0.432	46	96	142	4.3	83	5	7	16	56	15	93	2.8
Dazon Ingram	7	7	179	25.6	20	37	0.541	1	2	0.500	13	22	0.591	6	35	41	5.9	24	2	23	24	3	8	54	7.7
Michael Kessens	33	21	547	16.6	48	86	0.558	1	5	0.200	25	46	0.543	50	67	117	3.5	77	4	19	29	14	15	122	3.7
Riley Norris	33	19	930	28.2	77	208	0.370	45	120	0.375	47	72	0.653	54	122	176	5.3	64	0	23	39	8	26	246	7.5
Retin Obasohan	33	33	1067	32.3	193	410	0.471	48	129	0.372	146	209	0.699	19	107	126	3.8	83	3	87	82	10	45	580	17.6
Lawson Schaffer	16	0	32	2.0	2	10	0.200	2	9	0.222	2	4	0.500	2	0	2	0.1	3	0	2	1	0	1	8	0.5
Jimmie Taylor	33	33	694	21.0	68	119	0.571	0	0	0.000	36	97	0.371	53	101	154	4.7	85	4	13	41	59	17	172	5.2
Team														38	47	85		1			13				
Season total	33		6650		738	1750	0.422	259	763	0.339	458	712	0.643	327	814	1141	34.6	632	23	347	438	176	192	2193	66.5
Opponents	33		6650		769	1878	0.409	211	642	0.329	493	735	0.671	431	828	1259	38.2	648	16	370	401	97	189	2242	67.9

=== Schedule and results ===
Date time, TV	Rank^{#}	Opponent^{#}	Result	Record	High points	High rebounds	High assists	Site (attendance) city, state
Exhibition game
November 6*; 7 p.m., SECN+		Trevecca Nazarene	W 87–65	0–0	18 – Hale	9 – Kessens	5 – Obasohan	Coleman Coliseum (10,732); Tuscaloosa, AL
Non-conference regular season
November 13*; 7:30 p.m., SECN		Kennesaw State	W 77–64	1–0	18 – Obasohan	10 – Taylor	5 – Coleman	Coleman Coliseum (14,970); Tuscaloosa, AL
November 17*; Noon, ESPN		at Dayton; College Hoops Tip-Off Marathon	L 48–80	1–1	9 – Norris	6 – Hall	4 – Ingram	UD Arena (12,118); Dayton, OH
November 20*; 7 p.m., SECN+		Louisiana–Lafayette	W 105–93	2–1	18 – Tied	7 – Ingram	8 – Coleman	Coleman Coliseum (11,465); Tuscaloosa, AL
November 26*; 11 a.m., ESPN2		vs. No. 23 Xavier; AdvoCare Invitational – First round	L 45–64	2–2	10 – Tied	9 – Ingram	2 – Coleman	HP Field House (4,629); Lake Buena Vista, FL
November 27*; 11 a.m., ESPN3		vs. No. 20 Wichita State; AdvoCare Invitational – Consolation game	W 64–60	3–2	20 – Hale	8 – Ingram	3 – Ingram	HP Field House (4,170); Lake Buena Vista, FL
November 29*; 6 p.m, ESPNU		vs. No. 17 Notre Dame; AdvoCare Invitational – Fifth-place game	W 74–73	4–2	19 – Tied	9 – Kessens	5 – Obasohan	HP Field House (4,633); Lake Buena Vista, FL
December 4*; 7 p.m., FS1		at Southern Miss	W 58–55	5–2	20 – Obasohan	5 – Tied	4 – Ingram	Reed Green Coliseum (3,296); Hattiesburg, MS
December 13*; 5 p.m., ESPNU		at Clemson	W 51–50	6–2	23 – Obasohan	9 – Taylor	5 – Coleman	Bon Secours Wellness Arena (7,412); Greenville, SC
December 16*; 8 p.m., SECN		Winthrop	W 72–60	7–2	18 – Coleman	11 – Taylor	5 – Coleman	Coleman Coliseum (10,005); Tuscaloosa, AL
December 21*; 8 p.m., ESPNU		Oregon; Vulcan Classic	L 68–72	7–3	24 – Coleman	5 – Tied	6 – Coleman	BJCC (14,508); Birmingham, AL
December 29*; 7 p.m., SECN+		Jacksonville State	W 67–59 ^{OT}	8–3	16 – Edwards	11 – Norris	3 – Tied	Coleman Coliseum (11,417); Tuscaloosa, AL
January 2*; 1 p.m., SECN		Norfolk State	W 68–49	9–3	23 – Obasohan	9 – Kessens	6 – Coleman	Coleman Coliseum (10,884); Tuscaloosa, AL
SEC regular season
January 7; 8 p.m., ESPNU		at Ole Miss	L 66–74	9–4 (0–1)	23 – Obasohan	7 – Kessens	4 – Obasohan	The Pavilion at Ole Miss (9,500); Oxford, MS
January 9; 5 p.m., SECN		No. 9 Kentucky	L 61–77	9–5 (0–2)	21 – Obasohan	6 – Tied	2 – Tied	Coleman Coliseum (15,383); Tuscaloosa, AL
January 13; 8 p.m., SECN		No. 19 South Carolina	W 73–50	10–5 (1–2)	27 – Norris	7 – Norris	4 – Edwards	Coleman Coliseum (12,443); Tuscaloosa, AL
January 16; 5 p.m., SECN		at Vanderbilt	L 63–71	10–6 (1–3)	13 – Hale	9 – Taylor	3 – Coleman	Memorial Gymnasium (12,565); Nashville, TN
January 19; 8 p.m., SECN		at Auburn; Iron Bowl of Basketball	L 77–83	10–7 (1–4)	27 – Obasohan	8 – Taylor	5 – Coleman	Auburn Arena (9,121); Auburn, AL
January 23; 1 p.m., ESPNU		LSU	L 70–72	10–8 (1–5)	20 – Obasohan	10 – Norris	4 – Tied	Coleman Coliseum (15,383); Tuscaloosa, AL
January 26; 8 p.m., SECN		Tennessee	W 63–57	11–8 (2–5)	22 – Obasohan	13 – Norris	5 – Obasohan	Coleman Coliseum (11,429); Tuscaloosa, AL
January 30; 5 p.m., SECN		at South Carolina	L 64–78	11–9 (2–6)	23 – Obasohan	6 – Tied	4 – Tied	Colonial Life Arena (18,000); Columbia, SC
February 2; 8 p.m., SECN		at Mississippi State	W 82–80 ^{OT}	12–9 (3–6)	25 – Obasohan	6 – Taylor	8 – Obasohan	Humphrey Coliseum (6,265); Starkville, MS
February 6; 2 p.m., SECN		Missouri	W 80–71	13–9 (4–6)	18 – Norris	7 – Obasohan	5 – Coleman	Coleman Coliseum (15,383); Tuscaloosa, AL
February 10; 6 p.m., SECN		No. 15 Texas A&M	W 63–62	14–9 (5–6)	16 – Obasohan	10 – Hall	5 – Obasohan	Coleman Coliseum (11,086); Tuscaloosa, AL
February 13; 4:30 p.m., SECN		at Florida	W 61–55	15–9 (6–6)	15 – Obasohan	7 – Obasohan	2 – Tied	O'Connell Center (12,045); Gainesville, FL
February 17; 8 p.m., SECN		at LSU	W 76–69	16–9 (7–6)	35 – Obasohan	16 – Norris	5 – Coleman	Pete Maravich Assembly Center (10,703); Baton Rouge, LA
February 20; 1:30 p.m., SECN		Mississippi State	L 61–67	16–10 (7–7)	22 – Tied	7 – Edwards	3 – Tied	Coleman Coliseum (15,383); Tuscaloosa, AL
February 23; 6 p.m., ESPN		at No. 16 Kentucky	L 53–78	16–11 (7–8)	29 – Obasohan	8 – Hall	1 – Tied	Rupp Arena (24,262); Lexington, KY
February 27; 4 p.m., SECN		Auburn; Iron Bowl of Basketball	W 65–57	17–11 (8–8)	16 – Obasohan	8 – Tied	6 – Coleman	Coleman Coliseum (15,383); Tuscaloosa, AL
March 2; 8 p.m., SECN		Arkansas	L 61–62	17–12 (8–9)	32 – Obasohan	7 – Tied	3 – Tied	Coleman Coliseum (11,533); Tuscaloosa, AL
March 5; 3 p.m., ESPN2		at Georgia	L 63–70	17–13 (8–10)	25 – Hale	6 – Norris	3 – Tied	Stegeman Coliseum (8,280); Athens, GA
SEC Tournament
March 10; 6 p.m., SECN	(10)	vs. (7) Ole Miss; Second round	W 81–73	18–13	17 – Obasohan	11 – Norris	5 – Coleman	Bridgestone Arena (11,750); Nashville, TN
March 11; 6 p.m., SECN	(10)	vs. (2) No. 16 Kentucky; Quarterfinals	L 59–85	18–14	20 – Edwards	7 – Norris	2 – Obasohan	Bridgestone Arena (15,227); Nashville, TN
National Invitation Tournament
March 15*; 8 p.m., ESPN	(5)	at (4) Creighton; St. Bonaventure bracket – First round	L 54–72	18–15	18 – Coleman	8 – Hall	4 – Obasohan	CenturyLink Center Omaha (6,305); Omaha, NE
*Non-conference game. ^{#}Rankings from AP Poll. (#) Tournament seedings in parentheses. All times are in Central Time. (5) during NIT is seeding within St. Bonaventure bracket. Schedule link: http://www.rolltide.com/sports/m-baskbl/sched/alab-m-baskbl-sched.html

== Class of 2016 recruiting ==
Alabama currently holds two commitments for its 2016 recruiting class: JUCO swingman Ar'Mond Davis, who announced his commitment to Alabama on Twitter on September 23, 2015, after decommitting from Memphis earlier that month, and four-star forward Braxton Key (formerly Braxton Blackwell), who committed to the Tide over his hometown school, Vanderbilt, as well as Kansas and Texas, on October 21, 2015. On August 17, 2015, consensus five-star wing and McDonald's All-American Terrance Ferguson committed to Alabama. However, as Key and Davis signed their letters of commitment to the Capstone in November during the early signing period, Ferguson hesitated, causing numerous rumors to circulate questioning the strength of his commitment. Eventually, on March 1, Ferguson's high school basketball coach informed the media that the top-20 recruit had decided to decommit from Alabama and reopen his recruitment. He did not rule out a possible recommitment to Alabama, however, so now the Crimson Tide is competing with Kansas and others to land Ferguson.

College recruiting
Name	Hometown	School	Height	Weight	Commit date
Ar'Mond Davis; SG	Tacoma, Washington	College of Southern Idaho	6 ft 5.5 in (1.97 m)	179 lb (81 kg)	Sep 23, 2015
Ar'Mond Davis; SG	Recruit ratings: Scout: Rivals: 247Sports: ESPN: (JC)				
Braxton Key; SF	Mouth of Wilson, Virginia	Oak Hill Academy	6 ft 7.5 in (2.02 m)	216 lb (98 kg)	Oct 21, 2015
Braxton Key; SF	Recruit ratings: Scout: Rivals: 247Sports: ESPN: (85)				
Overall recruit ranking: Scout: NR Rivals: 14 247Sports: 45 ESPN: NR
Note: In many cases, Scout, Rivals, 247Sports, On3, and ESPN may conflict in their listings of height and weight.; In these cases, the average was taken. ESPN grades are on a 100-point scale.; Sources: "2016 Alabama Basketball Commits". Scout.; "2016 Player Commits – Alabama". ESPN.; "Scout.com Team Recruiting Rankings". Scout.; "2016 Team Ranking". Rivals.

Additional sources:

== See also ==
- Iron Bowl of Basketball
- 2015–16 NCAA Division I men's basketball season
- 2015–16 NCAA Division I men's basketball rankings
- 2015–16 Alabama Crimson Tide women's basketball team
