= 2015–16 Tennessee Volunteers basketball team =

American college basketball season

2015–16 Tennessee Volunteers basketball
- Conference: Southeastern Conference
- Record: 15–19 (6–12 SEC)
- Head coach: Rick Barnes (1st season)
- Assistant coaches: Rob Lanier; Desmond Oliver; Chris Ogden
- Home arena: Thompson–Boling Arena

2015–16 Southeastern Conference men's basketball standings
	Conf.				Overall
Team	W		L	PCT	W		L	PCT
No. 15 Texas A&M	13	–	5	.722	28	–	9	.757
No. 10 Kentucky †	13	–	5	.722	27	–	9	.750
South Carolina	11	–	7	.611	25	–	9	.735
Vanderbilt	11	–	7	.611	19	–	14	.576
LSU	11	–	7	.611	19	–	14	.576
Ole Miss	10	–	8	.556	20	–	12	.625
Georgia	10	–	8	.556	20	–	14	.588
Florida	9	–	9	.500	21	–	15	.583
Arkansas	9	–	9	.500	16	–	16	.500
Alabama	8	–	10	.444	18	–	15	.545
Mississippi State	7	–	11	.389	14	–	17	.452
Tennessee	6	–	12	.333	15	–	19	.441
Auburn	5	–	13	.278	11	–	20	.355
Missouri^{*}	3	–	15	.167	10	–	21	.323
† 2016 SEC tournament winner^{*}Ineligible for postseason play due to self-imposed postseason ban. Rankings from AP poll

The 2015–16 Tennessee Volunteers basketball team represented the University of Tennessee in the 2015–16 NCAA Division I men's basketball season. The Volunteers were led by head coach Rick Barnes in his first year with the Vols. The team played its home games at Thompson–Boling Arena in Knoxville, Tennessee, as a member of the Southeastern Conference. They finished the season 15–19, 6–12 in SEC play to finish in 12th place. They defeated Auburn and Vanderbilt to advance to the quarterfinals of the SEC tournament where they lost to LSU.

== Previous season ==
The Vols posted a record of 16–16, 7–11 in SEC play in the 2014–15 season and finished in 10th place. They advanced to the quarterfinals of the SEC tournament where they lost to Arkansas.

== Departures ==
Name	Number	Pos.	Height	Weight	Year	Hometown	Notes
Josh Richardson	1	G	6'6"	200	Senior	Edmond, OK	Graduated
Brandon Lopez	33	G	6'1"	180	Senior	Knoxville, TN	Graduated
Galen Campbell	25	G	6'2"	190	RS Junior	Knoxville, TN	Graduated
Ian Chiles	5	G	6'1"	200	RS Senior	Louisville, KY	Eligibility Ended
Tariq Owens	11	F	6'10"	205	Sophomore	Odenton, MD	Transferred to St. John's
Willie Carmichael III	24	F	6'8"	210	Sophomore	Apopka, FL	Transferred to Western Kentucky
Braxton Bonds	32	G	6'1"	170	RS Freshman	Nashville, TN	Transferred to Columbia State
Jabari McGhee	21	F	6'5"	207	RS Freshman	Albany, GA	Transferred at the end of fall semester to Western Kentucky

== Recruiting ==
College recruiting information (2015)
Name	Hometown	School	Height	Weight	Commit date
Kyle Alexander; C	Milton, Ontario, CA	Orangeville Prep	6 ft 10 in (2.08 m)	200 lb (91 kg)	May 7, 2015
Kyle Alexander; C	Recruit ratings: Scout: Rivals: 247Sports: ESPN:				
Lamonte' Turner; PG	Harvest, AL	IMG Academy	6 ft 2 in (1.88 m)	180 lb (82 kg)	Apr 28, 2015
Lamonte' Turner; PG	Recruit ratings: Scout: Rivals: 247Sports: ESPN: (80)				
Ray Kasongo; PF	Toronto, Ontario, CA	College of Southern Idaho	6 ft 9 in (2.06 m)	235 lb (107 kg)	Apr 28, 2015
Ray Kasongo; PF	Recruit ratings: Scout: Rivals: 247Sports: ESPN: (JC)				
Shembari Phillips; SG	Marietta, GA	Wheeler	6 ft 4 in (1.93 m)	185 lb (84 kg)	Sep 1, 2014
Shembari Phillips; SG	Recruit ratings: Scout: Rivals: 247Sports: ESPN: (75)				
Admiral Schofield; SF	Zion, IL	Zion-Benton Township	6 ft 5 in (1.96 m)	210 lb (95 kg)	Aug 31, 2014
Admiral Schofield; SF	Recruit ratings: Scout: Rivals: 247Sports: ESPN: (75)				
Overall recruit ranking: Scout: NR Rivals: NR ESPN: NR
Note: In many cases, Scout, Rivals, 247Sports, On3, and ESPN may conflict in their listings of height and weight.; In these cases, the average was taken. ESPN grades are on a 100-point scale.; Sources: "2015 Team Ranking". Rivals.

== Roster ==
2015–16 Tennessee Volunteers men's basketball team
Players
Coaches
}

Pos.	#	Name	Height	Weight	Year	Hometown
G	0	Kevin Punter (injured)	6 ft 2 in (1.88 m)	190 lb (86 kg)	Sr	Bronx, New York
G	1	Lamonte Turner (redshirt)	6 ft 1 in (1.85 m)	180 lb (82 kg)	Fr	Florence, Alabama
F	2	Ray Kasongo	6 ft 8 in (2.03 m)	245 lb (111 kg)	So	Toronto, Ontario, Canada
G	3	Robert Hubbs III	6 ft 4 in (1.93 m)	207 lb (94 kg)	Jr	Newbern, Tennessee
F	4	Armani Moore	6 ft 4 in (1.93 m)	217 lb (98 kg)	Sr	Kennesaw, Georgia
F	5	Admiral Schofield	6 ft 5 in (1.96 m)	240 lb (109 kg)	Fr	Zion, Illinois
F	11	Kyle Alexander	6 ft 9 in (2.06 m)	215 lb (98 kg)	Fr	Milton, Ontario, Canada
G	15	Detrick Mostella	6 ft 1 in (1.85 m)	175 lb (79 kg)	So	Decatur, Alabama
F	23	Derek Reese	6 ft 7 in (2.01 m)	230 lb (104 kg)	Sr	Orlando, Florida
G	24	Lucas Campbell (W)	6 ft 3 in (1.91 m)	180 lb (82 kg)	Fr	Knoxville, Tennessee
G	25	Shembari Phillips	6 ft 2 in (1.88 m)	190 lb (86 kg)	Fr	Atlanta, Georgia
G	32	Brad Woodson (W)	6 ft 1 in (1.85 m)	180 lb (82 kg)	Fr	Murfreesboro, Tennessee
G	34	Devon Baulkman	6 ft 4 in (1.93 m)	200 lb (91 kg)	Sr	Bainbridge, Georgia

Head coach

- Rick Barnes

Assistant coach(es)

- Rob Lanier
- Desmond Oliver
- Chris Ogden

Legend

- (C) Team captain
- (S) Suspended
- (I) Ineligible
- (W) Walk-on
- Injured
- Current redshirt

Roster
Last update: November 6, 2015

=== Depth chart ===
Pos.	Starting 5	Bench	Bench 3
C	Kyle Alexander	Derek Reese
PF	Armani Moore	Ray Kasongo
SF	Admiral Schofield	Robert Hubbs
SG	Devon Baulkman	Detrick Mostella	Lucas Campbell
PG	Kevin Punter	Shembari Phillips	Brad Woodson

== Schedule ==
Tennessee has been invited to play in the Barclays Center Classic, where they will host two to-be-determined opponents and then play against two of these three teams in Brooklyn: Cincinnati, Nebraska, and George Washington. The Vols will travel on the road to play at Butler, Georgia Tech, and TCU. Tennessee will matchup with Gonzaga in neutral venue in the Battle in Seattle. Tennessee will also host Marshall, East Tennessee State, and Florida Atlantic.

Date time, TV	Opponent	Result	Record	High points	High rebounds	High assists	Site (attendance) city, state
Exhibition
Nov. 6*; 7:00 pm	Alabama-Huntsville	W 96–83		29 – Moore	10 – Moore	5 – Tied	Thompson–Boling Arena; Knoxville, TN
Regular season
Nov. 13*; 7:00 pm	UNC Asheville	W 82–78	1–0	31 – Punter	8 – Moore, Reese	6 – Moore	Thompson–Boling Arena (11,564); Knoxville, TN
Nov. 16*; 7:00 pm, ESPNU	at Georgia Tech	L 67–69	1–1	17 – Moore	10 – Reese	3 – Hubbs	Hank McCamish Pavilion (5,467); Atlanta, GA
Nov. 19*; 7:00 pm	Marshall	W 84–74	2–1	20 – Moore	13 – Reese	4 – Punter	Thompson–Boling Arena (12,341); Knoxville, TN
Nov. 22*; 12:00 pm, SECN	Gardner–Webb; Barclays Center Classic first round	W 89–64	3–1	24 – Punter	16 – Moore	6 – Punter	Thompson–Boling Arena (11,911); Knoxville, TN
Nov. 24*; 7:00 pm, SECN	Army; Barclays Center Classic second round	W 95–80	4–1	29 – Moore	11 – Reese	6 – Moore	Thompson–Boling Arena (13,326); Knoxville, TN
Nov. 27*; 9:00 pm, ASN	vs. George Washington; Barclays Center Classic semifinals	L 70–73	4–2	24 – Punter	6 – Moore, Reese	4 – Moore	Barclays Center; Brooklyn, NY
Nov. 28*; Noon	vs. Nebraska; Barclays Center Classic Consolation	L 71–82	4–3	23 – Punter	5 – Alexander	5 – Punter	Barclays Center; Brooklyn, NY
Dec. 12*; 2:30 pm, FS1	at No. 18 Butler	L 86–94	4–4	27 – Punter	7 – Schofield	7 – Moore	Hinkle Fieldhouse (9,100); Indianapolis, IN
Dec. 16*; 7:00 pm	Florida Atlantic	W 81–62	5–4	24 – Punter	8 – Reese	5 – Punter	Thompson–Boling Arena (12,309); Knoxville, TN
Dec. 19*; 11:00 pm, ESPNU	vs. Gonzaga; Battle in Seattle	L 79–86	5–5	23 – Punter	7 – Baulkman	5 – Punter	KeyArena (16,770); Seattle, WA
Dec. 22*; 7:00 pm	East Tennessee State	W 76–67	6–5	17 – Mostella	11 – Moore	4 – Mostella	Thompson–Boling Arena (14,684); Knoxville, TN
Dec. 29*; 1:00 pm, SECN	Tennessee State	W 74–69	7–5	23 – Punter	14 – Moore	6 – Moore	Thompson–Boling Arena (13,214); Knoxville, TN
Jan. 2; 2:00 pm, CBS	at Auburn	L 77–83	7–6 (0–1)	31 – Punter	9 – Moore	4 – Punter, Moore	Auburn Arena (8,614); Auburn, AL
Jan. 6; 7:00 pm, ESPN2	Florida	W 83–69	8–6 (1–1)	26 – Punter	9 – Hubbs	6 – Moore	Thompson–Boling Arena (14,387); Knoxville, TN
Jan. 9; 1:00 pm, SECN	No. 21 Texas A&M	L 88–92	8–7 (1–2)	19 – Punter	6 – Moore, Schofield	5 – Tied	Thompson–Boling Arena (14,907); Knoxville, TN
Jan. 13; 7:00 pm, SECN	at Georgia	L 72–81	8–8 (1–3)	16 – Mostella, Punter	8 – Moore	5 – Moore	Stegeman Coliseum (8,029); Athens, GA
Jan. 16; 3:30 pm, SECN	at Mississippi State	W 80–75	9–8 (2–3)	24 – Mostella	8 – Reese	5 – Punter	Humphrey Coliseum (5,926); Starkville, MS
Jan. 20; 9:00 pm, SECN	Vanderbilt	L 74–88	9–9 (2–4)	26 – Punter	8 – Moore	3 – Punter, Moore	Thompson–Boling Arena (13,561); Knoxville, TN
Jan. 23; Noon, SECN	No. 24 South Carolina	W 78–69	10–9 (3–4)	36 – Punter	8 – Hubbs	4 – Baulkman, Moore	Thompson–Boling Arena (13,928); Knoxville, TN
Jan. 26; 9:00 pm, SECN	at Alabama	L 57–63	10–10 (3–5)	15 – Punter	11 – Moore	4 – Baulkman, Moore	Coleman Coliseum (11,429); Tuscaloosa, AL
Jan. 30*; 2:00 pm, ESPN2	at TCU; Big 12/SEC Challenge	L 63–75	10–11	24 – Punter	11 – Alexander	6 – Moore	Daniel–Meyer Coliseum (5,761); Fort Worth, TX
Feb. 2; 7:00 pm, ESPN	No. 20 Kentucky; Rivalry	W 84–77	11–11 (4–5)	27 – Punter	13 – Moore	4 – Moore	Thompson–Boling Arena (19,295); Knoxville, TN
Feb. 6; 8:00 pm, SECN	at Arkansas	L 67–85	11–12 (4–6)	24 – Punter	5 – Tied	7 – Punter	Bud Walton Arena (15,970); Fayetteville, AR
Feb. 9; 7:00 pm, SECN	Auburn	W 71–45	12–12 (5–6)	20 – Hubbs	12 – Moore	4 – Baulkman, Moore	Thompson–Boling Arena (13,740); Knoxville, TN
Feb. 13; 3:00 pm, SECN	at Missouri	L 64–75	12–13 (5–7)	21 – Punter	7 – Alexander	3 – Punter	Mizzou Arena (10,536); Columbia, MO
Feb. 18; 7:00 pm, ESPN	at No. 14 Kentucky; Rivalry	L 70–80	12–14 (5–8)	21 – Moore	11 – Moore	2 – Baulkman, Moore	Rupp Arena (24,274); Lexington, KY
Feb. 20; 5:30 pm, ESPNU	LSU	W 81–65	13–14 (6–8)	19 – Hubbs	10 – Moore	7 – Moore	Thompson–Boling Arena (19,721); Knoxville, TN
Feb. 24; 9:00 pm, SECN	at South Carolina	L 58–84	13–15 (6–9)	19 – Baulkman	9 – Alexander	6 – Moore	Colonial Life Arena (13,224); Columbia, SC
Feb. 27; 7:30 pm, SECN	Arkansas	L 65–75	13–16 (6–10)	17 – Moore	11 – Moore	5 – Moore	Thompson–Boling Arena (14,413); Knoxville, TN
Mar. 1; 7:00 pm, SECN	at Vanderbilt	L 69–86	13–17 (6–11)	23 – Phillips	7 – Phillips	6 – Moore	Memorial Gymnasium (13,099); Nashville, TN
Mar. 5 Noon, SECN	Ole Miss	L 60–83	13–18 (6–12)	18 – Baulkman	6 – Schofield	4 – Schofield	Thompson–Boling Arena (14,424); Knoxville, TN
SEC tournament
Mar. 9; 8:00 pm, SECN	vs. Auburn; First round	W 97–59	14–18	22 – Moore	11 – Reese	5 – Moore	Bridgestone Arena (9,787); Nashville, TN
Mar. 10; 3:30 pm, SECN	vs. Vanderbilt; Second round	W 67–65	15–18	18 – Mostella	10 – Reese	3 – Moore, Mostella	Bridgestone Arena (12,270); Nashville, TN
Mar. 11; 3:30 pm, SECN	vs. LSU; Quarterfinals	L 75–84	15–19	19 – Hubbs	6 – Moore	8 – Moore	Bridgestone Arena (15,222); Nashville, TN
*Non-conference game. ^{#}Rankings from AP Poll. (#) Tournament seedings in parentheses. All times are in Eastern Time.
