= Djery Baptiste =

Haitian basketball player

Free agent
- Position: Center

Personal information
- Born: 12 November 1995 (age 31) Gonaïves, Haiti
- Listed height: 6 ft 11 in (2.11 m)
- Listed weight: 245 lb (111 kg)

Career information
- High school: Prestonwood Christian Academy (Plano, Texas)
- College: Vanderbilt (2015–2018); UMass (2018–2020)

Career history
- 2025: Rajawali Medan

Djery Jean Baptiste (/ˈdʒɛri ˈbæptiːst/ JERR-ee BAP-teest; born 12 November 1995) is a Haitian basketball who last played for Rajawali Medan of the Indonesian Basketball League (IBL). He played college basketball for the Vanderbilt Commodores and the UMass Minutemen.

== Early life and high school career ==
Baptiste was born in Gonaïves, Haiti to Hebert Jean Baptiste and Wislonde Destin. He arrived in the United States when he was 15 years old.

Baptiste attended the Prestonwood Christian Academy in Plano, Texas and won two consecutive state championships the two years he was there. At the end of his senior year, he was named Defensive Player of the Year by his team. He was named All-Area Honorable Mention by the Dallas Morning News.

== College career ==
Baptiste chose to play at Vanderbilt for academic reasons, despite receiving multiple offers from other schools.

Baptiste departed from the team in June 2018 to focus on his studies.

In August 2018, it was announced that Baptiste will be transferring to UMass after he graduates from Vanderbilt in December 2018. During his redshirt senior season, he missed three games with a knee injury.

== Career statistics ==
Legend
| GP | Games played | GS | Games started | MPG | Minutes per game |
| FG% | Field goal percentage | 3P% | 3-point field goal percentage | FT% | Free throw percentage |
| RPG | Rebounds per game | APG | Assists per game | SPG | Steals per game |
| BPG | Blocks per game | PPG | Points per game | **Bold** | Career high |

=== College ===
| Year | Team | GP | GS | MPG | FG% | 3P% | FT% | RPG | APG | SPG | BPG | PPG |
|---|---|---|---|---|---|---|---|---|---|---|---|---|
| 2015–16 | Vanderbilt | Redshirt | | | | | | | | | | |
| 2016–17 | Vanderbilt | **35** | 2 | 7.8 | **.521** | – | .650 | 1.9 | .0 | .1 | .4 | 1.8 |
| 2017–18 | Vanderbilt | 29 | 10 | 15.2 | .455 | – | **.732** | 3.6 | .2 | .2 | .9 | **3.1** |
| 2018–19 | UMass | 20 | **12** | **17.9** | .511 | – | .455 | **4.1** | **.3** | .3 | **1.2** | 2.9 |
| 2019–20 | UMass | 27 | 0 | 10.6 | .510 | – | .389 | 2.6 | .1 | **.4** | .9 | 2.1 |
| Career | | 111 | 24 | 12.2 | .495 | – | .594 | 2.9 | .1 | .2 | .8 | 2.4 |

== Personal life ==
Baptiste arrived from Haiti speaking no English. He taught himself English from music listening to country singer George Strait's songs and is now his favorite genre. He speaks French, Haitian Creole, and Spanish fluently.
