= 2015–16 LSU Tigers basketball team =

American college basketball season

2015–16 LSU Tigers basketball
- Conference: Southeastern Conference
- Record: 19–14 (11–7 SEC)
- Head coach: Johnny Jones (4th season)
- Assistant coaches: David Patrick; Brendan Suhr; Al Pinkins
- Home arena: Pete Maravich Assembly Center

2015–16 Southeastern Conference men's basketball standings
	Conf.				Overall
Team	W		L	PCT	W		L	PCT
No. 15 Texas A&M	13	–	5	.722	28	–	9	.757
No. 10 Kentucky †	13	–	5	.722	27	–	9	.750
South Carolina	11	–	7	.611	25	–	9	.735
Vanderbilt	11	–	7	.611	19	–	14	.576
LSU	11	–	7	.611	19	–	14	.576
Ole Miss	10	–	8	.556	20	–	12	.625
Georgia	10	–	8	.556	20	–	14	.588
Florida	9	–	9	.500	21	–	15	.583
Arkansas	9	–	9	.500	16	–	16	.500
Alabama	8	–	10	.444	18	–	15	.545
Mississippi State	7	–	11	.389	14	–	17	.452
Tennessee	6	–	12	.333	15	–	19	.441
Auburn	5	–	13	.278	11	–	20	.355
Missouri^{*}	3	–	15	.167	10	–	21	.323
† 2016 SEC tournament winner^{*}Ineligible for postseason play due to self-imposed postseason ban. Rankings from AP poll

The 2015–16 LSU Tigers basketball team represented Louisiana State University during the 2015–16 NCAA Division I men's basketball season. The team's head coach was Johnny Jones, who was in his fourth season at LSU. They played their home games at the Pete Maravich Assembly Center in Baton Rouge, Louisiana, as a member of the Southeastern Conference. They finished the season 19–14, 11–7 in SEC play to finish in a three-way tie for third place. They defeated Tennessee in the quarterfinals of the 2016 SEC tournament to advance to the semifinals where they lost to Texas A&M. On March 13, the day after losing to Texas A&M by 33 points, they announced they would not participate in a postseason tournament.

== Previous season and offseason ==
LSU completed the 2014–15 season with an overall record of 22–11 and 11–7 in SEC play to finish in a four-way tie for third place in the final SEC standings. They lost in the quarterfinals of the SEC tournament to Auburn. The Tigers received an at-large bid to the NCAA tournament where they lost in the second round to NC State.

== Departures ==
Name	Number	Pos.	Height	Weight	Year	Hometown	Notes
Jarell Martin	1	F	6'9"	239	Sophomore	Baton Rouge, LA	NBA Draft
Antonio Robinson	13	G	6'1"	170	Senior	Bossier City, LA	Graduated
Carlton Speight	24	G	6'4"	200	Freshman	New Orleans, Louisiana	Walk-on; did not return to team
Jordan Mickey	25	F	6' 8"	238	Sophomore	Arlington, TX	NBA Draft
John Odo	31	F	6'10"	245	Senior	Lagos, Nigeria	Graduated

=== incoming transfers ===
- Craig Victor II, transfer from Arizona.

=== Class of 2015 signees ===
Tigers recruits at the 2015 McDonald's All-American Boys Game

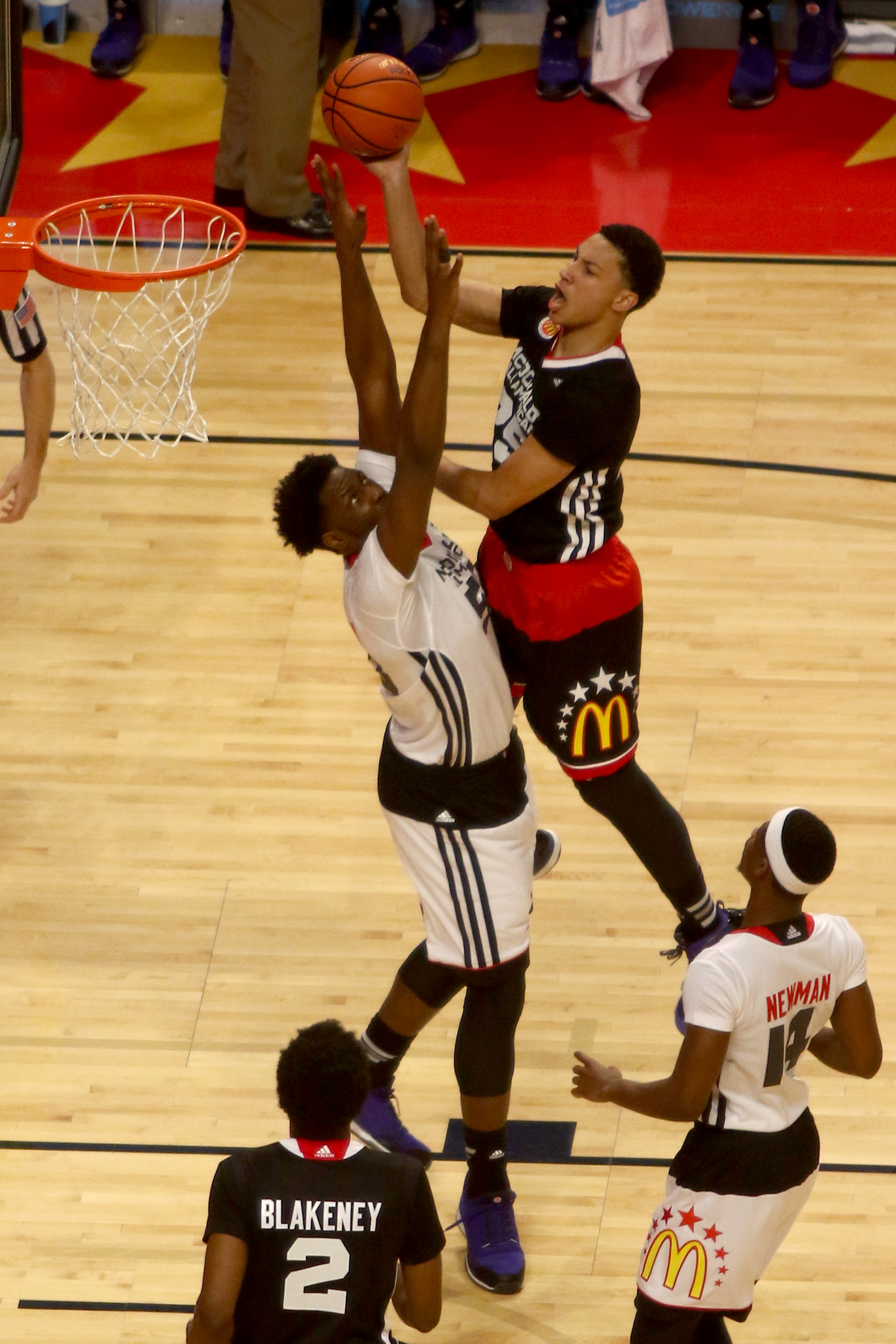
Ben Simmons

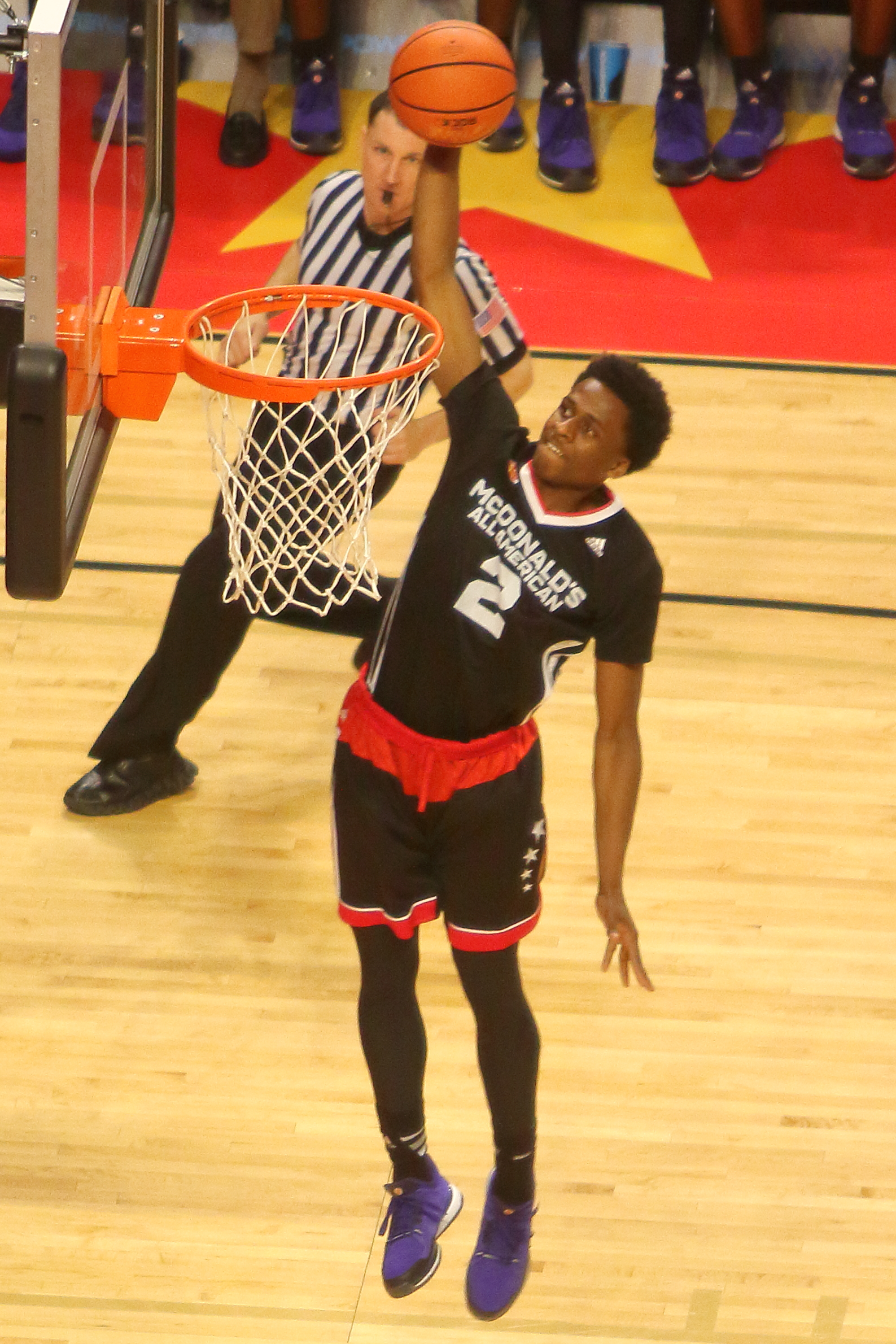
Antonio Blakeney

College recruiting information
Name	Hometown	School	Height	Weight	Commit date
Antonio Blakeney; SG	Orlando, Florida	Oak Ridge High School	6 ft 4 in (1.93 m)	170 lb (77 kg)	Jan 2, 2015
Antonio Blakeney; SG	Recruit ratings: Scout: Rivals: 247Sports: ESPN:				
Brandon Sampson; SG	Baton Rouge, Louisiana	Madison Prep Academy	6 ft 4 in (1.93 m)	175 lb (79 kg)	Apr 20, 2015
Brandon Sampson; SG	Recruit ratings: Scout: Rivals: 247Sports: ESPN:				
Ben Simmons; PF	Melbourne, Australia	Montverde Academy	6 ft 9 in (2.06 m)	225 lb (102 kg)	Oct 14, 2013
Ben Simmons; PF	Recruit ratings: Scout: Rivals: 247Sports: ESPN:				
Overall recruit ranking:
Note: In many cases, Scout, Rivals, 247Sports, On3, and ESPN may conflict in their listings of height and weight.; In these cases, the average was taken. ESPN grades are on a 100-point scale.; Sources: "LSU 2015 Basketball Commitments". Rivals.; "2015 LSU Basketball Commits". Scout.; "ESPN". ESPN.; "Scout.com Team Recruiting Rankings". Scout.; "2015 Team Ranking". Rivals.

== Roster ==
2015–16 LSU Tigers men's basketball team
Players
Coaches

Pos.	#	Name	Height	Weight	Year	Hometown
G	0	Brandon Sampson	6 ft 5 in (1.96 m)	186 lb (84 kg)	Fr	Baton Rouge, Louisiana
G	2	Antonio Blakeney	6 ft 4 in (1.93 m)	190 lb (86 kg)	Fr	Orlando, Florida
C	3	Elbert Robinson III	7 ft 1 in (2.16 m)	290 lb (132 kg)	So	Garland, Texas
G	4	Keith Hornsby	6 ft 4 in (1.93 m)	210 lb (95 kg)	RS Sr	Williamsburg, Virginia
G	5	Josh Gray	6 ft 1 in (1.85 m)	177 lb (80 kg)	Sr	Lake Charles, Louisiana
G	10	Henry Shortess (W)	5 ft 9 in (1.75 m)	157 lb (71 kg)	Jr	Baton Rouge, Louisiana
G	15	Jalyn Patterson	6 ft 1 in (1.85 m)	185 lb (84 kg)	So	Alpharetta, Georgia
F	20	Brian Bridgewater	6 ft 5 in (1.96 m)	282 lb (128 kg)	Jr	Baton Rouge, Louisiana
F	21	Aaron Epps	6 ft 9 in (2.06 m)	220 lb (100 kg)	So	Ball, Louisiana
C	22	Darcy Malone	7 ft 0 in (2.13 m)	246 lb (112 kg)	Jr	Canberra, Australia
F	25	Ben Simmons	6 ft 10 in (2.08 m)	240 lb (109 kg)	Fr	Melbourne, Australia
G/F	32	Craig Victor II	6 ft 9 in (2.06 m)	235 lb (107 kg)	RS Fr	New Orleans, Louisiana
F	45	Brandon Eddlestone (W)	6 ft 8 in (2.03 m)	248 lb (112 kg)	Jr	Slidell, Louisiana
G	55	Tim Quarterman	6 ft 6 in (1.98 m)	190 lb (86 kg)	Jr	Savannah, Georgia

Head coach

- Johnny Jones (LSU)

Assistant coach(es)

- David Patrick (Louisiana)
- Brendan Suhr (Montclair State)
- Al Pinkins (NC State)

Legend

- (C) Team captain
- (S) Suspended
- (I) Ineligible
- (W) Walk-on
- Injured
- Current redshirt

Roster
Last update: August 22, 2015

== Schedule and results ==
Date time, TV	Rank^{#}	Opponent^{#}	Result	Record	High points	High rebounds	High assists	Site (attendance) city, state
Exhibition
Nov. 6, 2015*; 7:00 pm	No. 21	Southwest Baptist	W 98–72	–	19 – Sampson	9 – Simmons	5 – Simmons	Maravich Center; Baton Rouge, LA
Regular season
Nov. 13, 2015*; 8:00 pm, ESPNU	No. 21	McNeese State	W 81–70	1–0	22 – Blakeney	13 – Simmons	5 – Simmons	Maravich Center (11,697); Baton Rouge, LA
Nov. 16, 2015*; 8:00 pm, ESPNU	No. 23	Kennesaw State; Legends Classic	W 91–69	2–0	22 – Simmons	9 – Simmons	6 – Tied	Maravich Center (9,654); Baton Rouge, LA
Nov. 19, 2015*; 8:00 pm, SECN	No. 23	South Alabama; Legends Classic	W 78–66	3–0	23 – Simmons	16 – Simmons	5 – Quarterman	Maravich Center (9,758); Baton Rouge, LA
Nov. 23, 2015*; 6:00 pm, ESPN2	No. 22	vs. Marquette; Legends Classic semifinals	L 80–81	3–1	21 – Simmons	19 – Simmons	7 – Simmons	Barclays Center (5,775); Brooklyn, NY
Nov. 24, 2015*; 4:30 pm, ESPNU	No. 22	vs. NC State; Legends Classic 3rd place game	L 72–83 ^{OT}	3–2	19 – Quarterman	16 – Simmons	10 – Simmons	Barclays Center (4,777); Brooklyn, NY
Nov. 30, 2015*; 6:00 pm		at College of Charleston	L 58–70	3–3	15 – Simmons	18 – Simmons	5 – Patterson	TD Arena (4,761); Charleston, SC
Dec. 2, 2015*; 7:00 pm		North Florida	W 119–108	4–3	43 – Simmons	14 – Simmons	7 – Simmons	Maravich Center (8,981); Baton Rouge, LA
Dec. 13, 2015*; 7:00 pm, ESPNU		at Houston	L 98–105 ^{OT}	4–4	32 – Hornsby	14 – Simmons	6 – Quarterman	Hofheinz Pavilion (7,918); Houston, TX
Dec. 16, 2015*; 6:00 pm, SECN		Gardner–Webb	W 78–57	5–4	14 – Hornsby	12 – Simmons	4 – Simmons	Maravich Center (8,896); Baton Rouge, LA
Dec. 19, 2015*; 7:00 pm, SECN		Oral Roberts	W 100–77	6–4	24 – Simmons	7 – Robinson III	7 – Simmons	Maravich Center (10,095); Baton Rouge, LA
Dec. 22, 2015*; 7:00 pm, SECN		American	W 79–51	7–4	23 – Simmons	5 – Tied	6 – Simmons	Maravich Center (9,902); Baton Rouge, LA
Dec. 29, 2015*; 7:00 pm, SECN		Wake Forest	L 71–77	7–5	21 – Simmons	12 – Simmons	3 – Gray	Maravich Center (12,104); Baton Rouge, LA
Jan. 2, 2016; 8:00 pm, ESPN2		at Vanderbilt	W 90–82	8–5 (1–0)	36 – Simmons	14 – Simmons	4 – Simmons	Memorial Gymnasium (13,380); Nashville, TN
Jan. 5, 2016; 8:00 pm, ESPN		No. 9 Kentucky	W 85–67	9–5 (2–0)	21 – Quarterman	12 – Victor II	7 – Quarterman	Maravich Center (13,573); Baton Rouge, LA
Jan. 9, 2016; 12:30 pm, CBS		at Florida	L 62–68	9–6 (2–1)	28 – Simmons	17 – Simmons	4 – Simmons	O'Connell Center (11,350); Gainesville, FL
Jan. 13, 2016; 8:00 pm, ESPN2		Ole Miss	W 90–81	10–6 (3–1)	18 – Victor II	6 – Victor II	7 – Simmons	Maravich Center (12,133); Baton Rouge, LA
Jan. 16, 2016; 7:30 pm, SECN		Arkansas	W 76–74	11–6 (4–1)	16 – Tied	18 – Simmons	3 – Tied	Maravich Center (13,610); Baton Rouge, LA
Jan. 19, 2016; 8:00 pm, ESPN		at No. 10 Texas A&M	L 57–71	11–7 (4–2)	12 – Quarterman	11 – Simmons	5 – Simmons	Reed Arena (13,888); College Station, TX
Jan. 23, 2016; 1:00 pm, ESPNU		at Alabama	W 72–70	12–7 (5–2)	23 – Simmons	8 – Simmons	5 – Simmons	Coleman Coliseum (15,383); Tuscaloosa, AL
Jan. 26, 2016; 8:00 pm, ESPN		Georgia	W 89–85	13–7 (6–2)	22 – Tied	14 – Simmons	5 – Quarterman	Maravich Center (10,749); Baton Rouge, LA
Jan. 30, 2016*; 1:00 pm, ESPN		No. 1 Oklahoma; Big 12/SEC Challenge	L 75–77	13–8	18 – Quarterman	9 – Simmons	5 – Simmons	Maravich Center (13,882); Baton Rouge, LA
Feb. 2, 2016; 6:00 pm, SECN		at Auburn	W 80–68	14–8 (7–2)	21 – Simmons	13 – Simmons	7 – Simmons	Auburn Arena (8,051); Auburn, AL
Feb. 6, 2016; 5:00 pm, ESPN2		Mississippi State	W 88–77	15–8 (8–2)	31 – Blakeney	9 – Simmons	7 – Simmons	Maravich Center (13,123); Baton Rouge, LA
Feb. 10, 2016; 6:00 pm, ESPN2		at South Carolina	L 83–94	15–9 (8–3)	22 – Blakeney	6 – Tied	6 – Simmons	Colonial Life Arena (16,009); Columbia, SC
Feb. 13, 2016; 12:00 pm, CBS		No. 15 Texas A&M	W 76–71	16–9 (9–3)	16 – Tied	11 – Simmons	7 – Simmons	Maravich Center (12,928); Baton Rouge, LA
Feb. 17, 2016; 8:00 pm, SECN		Alabama	L 69–76	16–10 (9–4)	21 – Victor II	10 – Simmons	4 – Blakeney	Maravich Center (10,703); Baton Rouge, LA
Feb. 20, 2016; 4:30 pm, ESPNU		at Tennessee	L 65–81	16–11 (9–5)	21 – Simmons	9 – Simmons	5 – Quarterman	Thompson–Boling Arena (19,721); Knoxville, TN
Feb. 23, 2016; 6:00 pm, ESPNU		at Arkansas	L 65–85	16–12 (9–6)	23 – Simmons	12 – Simmons	6 – Tied	Bud Walton Arena (9,522); Fayetteville, AR
Feb. 27, 2016; 7:30 pm, ESPN		Florida	W 96–91	17–12 (10–6)	32 – Blakeney	11 – Simmons	5 – Simmons	Maravich Center (13,468); Baton Rouge, LA
Mar. 2, 2016; 8:00 pm, SECN		Missouri	W 80–71	18–12 (11–6)	22 – Simmons	14 – Simmons	7 – Simmons	Maravich Center (9,652); Baton Rouge, LA
Mar. 5, 2016; 1:00 pm, CBS		at No. 22 Kentucky	L 77–94	18–13 (11–7)	23 – Quarterman	11 – Simmons	4 – Simmons	Rupp Arena (24,414); Lexington, KY
SEC Tournament
Mar. 11, 2016; 2:30 pm, SECN	(4)	vs. (12) Tennessee; Quarterfinals	W 84–75	19–13	22 – Blakeney	9 – Victor II	7 – Quarterman	Bridgestone Arena (15,222); Nashville, TN
Mar. 12, 2016; 12:00 pm, ESPN	(4)	vs. (1) No. 17 Texas A&M; Semifinals	L 38–71	19–14	10 – Simmons	12 – Simmons	2 – Sampson	Bridgestone Arena (19,108); Nashville, TN
*Non-conference game. ^{#}Rankings from AP Poll. (#) Tournament seedings in parentheses. All times are in Central Time.

== See also ==
- 2015–16 NCAA Division I men's basketball season
