= 2015–16 Arkansas Razorbacks men's basketball team =

American college basketball season

2015–16 Arkansas Razorbacks men's basketball
- Conference: Southeastern Conference
- Record: 16–16 (9–9 SEC)
- Head coach: Mike Anderson (5th season)
- Associate head coach: Melvin Watkins
- Assistant coaches: T. J. Cleveland; Matt Zimmerman
- Home arena: Bud Walton Arena

2015–16 Southeastern Conference men's basketball standings
| | Conf. | | | | Overall |
| Team | W | | L | PCT | W | | L | PCT |
|---|---|---|---|---|---|---|---|---|
| No. 15 Texas A&M | 13 | – | 5 | .722 | 28 | – | 9 | .757 |
| No. 10 Kentucky † | 13 | – | 5 | .722 | 27 | – | 9 | .750 |
| South Carolina | 11 | – | 7 | .611 | 25 | – | 9 | .735 |
| Vanderbilt | 11 | – | 7 | .611 | 19 | – | 14 | .576 |
| LSU | 11 | – | 7 | .611 | 19 | – | 14 | .576 |
| Ole Miss | 10 | – | 8 | .556 | 20 | – | 12 | .625 |
| Georgia | 10 | – | 8 | .556 | 20 | – | 14 | .588 |
| Florida | 9 | – | 9 | .500 | 21 | – | 15 | .583 |
| Arkansas | 9 | – | 9 | .500 | 16 | – | 16 | .500 |
| Alabama | 8 | – | 10 | .444 | 18 | – | 15 | .545 |
| Mississippi State | 7 | – | 11 | .389 | 14 | – | 17 | .452 |
| Tennessee | 6 | – | 12 | .333 | 15 | – | 19 | .441 |
| Auburn | 5 | – | 13 | .278 | 11 | – | 20 | .355 |
| Missouri^{*} | 3 | – | 15 | .167 | 10 | – | 21 | .323 |
† 2016 SEC tournament winner^{*}Ineligible for postseason play due to self-imposed postseason ban. Rankings from AP poll

The 2015–16 Arkansas Razorbacks men's basketball team represented the University of Arkansas in the 2015–16 season. The team's head coach was Mike Anderson, who was in his fifth season. The team played their home games at Bud Walton Arena in Fayetteville, Arkansas, as a member of the SEC. They finished the season 16–16, 9–9 in SEC play to finish in a tie for eighth place. They lost in the second round of the SEC tournament to Florida.

== Previous season ==
The Razorbacks achieved a 27–9 record during the 2014–15 season, where they finished runner-up to Kentucky both in the league and in the SEC tournament.

Arkansas earned its first NCAA tournament berth since 2008, defeating Wofford before falling to North Carolina in the round of 32.

== Departures ==
| Name | Number | Pos. | Height | Weight | Year | Hometown | Notes |
|---|---|---|---|---|---|---|---|
| Rashad Madden | 00 | G | 6'5" | 180 | Senior | Lepanto, AR | Graduated |
| Alandise Harris | 2 | G | 6'6" | 237 | RS Senior | Little Rock, AR | Graduated |
| Bobby Portis | 10 | F | 6'11" | 242 | Sophomore | Little Rock, AR | Declared for 2015 NBA draft |
| Nick Babb | 14 | G | 6'4" | 185 | Freshman | Arlington, TX | Transferred to Iowa State |
| JaCorey Williams | 22 | F | 6'8" | 218 | Junior | Birmingham, AL | Transferred to Middle Tennessee State |
| Michael Qualls | 24 | G | 6'6" | 210 | Junior | Shreveport, LA | Declared for 2015 NBA draft |

=== Incoming transfers ===
| Name | Number | Pos. | Height | Weight | Year | Hometown | Previous School |
|---|---|---|---|---|---|---|---|
| Dustin Thomas | 13 | G/F | 6'7" | 225 | Junior | Texarkana, TX | Transferred from Colorado. Under NCAA transfer rules, Thomas will have to sit out for the 2015–16 season. Will have two years of remaining eligibility. |
| Willy Kouassi | 50 | C | 6'10" | 230 | Senior | Abidjan, Ivory Coast | Transferred from Kennesaw State. Will be eligible to play immediately since Kouassi graduated from Kennesaw State. |

== Incoming class ==
College recruiting
| Name | Hometown | School | Height | Weight | Commit date |
|---|---|---|---|---|---|
| Jimmy Whitt; G | Columbia, Missouri | Hickman High School | 6 ft 4 in (1.93 m) | 180 lb (82 kg) | Aug 19, 2014 |
| Jimmy Whitt; G | Recruit ratings: Scout: Rivals: 247Sports: ESPN: | | | | |
| Lorenzo Jenkins; F | Naples, Florida | First Baptist Academy | 6 ft 6 in (1.98 m) | 210 lb (95 kg) | Aug 8, 2015 |
| Lorenzo Jenkins; F | Recruit ratings: Scout: Rivals: 247Sports: ESPN: | | | | |
Overall recruit ranking:
Note: In many cases, Scout, Rivals, 247Sports, On3, and ESPN may conflict in their listings of height and weight.; In these cases, the average was taken. ESPN grades are on a 100-point scale.; Sources: "ESPN". ESPN.; "2015 Team Ranking". Rivals.

=== Recruiting class of 2016 ===
College recruiting (2016)
| Name | Hometown | School | Height | Weight | Commit date |
|---|---|---|---|---|---|
| Arlando Cook; F | St. Louis, Missouri | Connors State College | 6 ft 9 in (2.06 m) | 215 lb (98 kg) | Nov 5, 2015 |
| Arlando Cook; F | Recruit ratings: Scout: Rivals: 247Sports: ESPN: | | | | |
| Adrio Bailey; F | Campti, Louisiana | Lakeview High School | 6 ft 7 in (2.01 m) | 215 lb (98 kg) | Oct 18, 2015 |
| Adrio Bailey; F | Recruit ratings: Scout: Rivals: 247Sports: ESPN: | | | | |
| Jaylen Barford; G | Jackson, Tennessee | Motlow State Community College | 6 ft 4 in (1.93 m) | 200 lb (91 kg) | Sep 22, 2015 |
| Jaylen Barford; G | Recruit ratings: Scout: Rivals: 247Sports: ESPN: | | | | |
| Daryl Macon; G | Little Rock, Arkansas | Holmes Community College | 6 ft 3 in (1.91 m) | 185 lb (84 kg) | Jun 6, 2015 |
| Daryl Macon; G | Recruit ratings: Scout: Rivals: 247Sports: ESPN: | | | | |
| C.J. Jones; G | Birmingham, Alabama | Central Park Christian High School | 6 ft 4 in (1.93 m) | 180 lb (82 kg) | Feb 20, 2016 |
| C.J. Jones; G | Recruit ratings: Scout: Rivals: 247Sports: ESPN: | | | | |
Overall recruit ranking:
Note: In many cases, Scout, Rivals, 247Sports, On3, and ESPN may conflict in their listings of height and weight.; In these cases, the average was taken. ESPN grades are on a 100-point scale.; Sources: "ESPN". ESPN.; "2016 Team Ranking". Rivals.

=== Recruiting class of 2017 ===
College recruiting (2017)
| Name | Hometown | School | Height | Weight | Commit date |
|---|---|---|---|---|---|
| Daniel Gafford; F | El Dorado, Arkansas | El Dorado High School | 6 ft 10 in (2.08 m) | 210 lb (95 kg) | Aug 1, 2015 |
| Daniel Gafford; F | Recruit ratings: Scout: Rivals: 247Sports: ESPN: | | | | |
Overall recruit ranking:
Note: In many cases, Scout, Rivals, 247Sports, On3, and ESPN may conflict in their listings of height and weight.; In these cases, the average was taken. ESPN grades are on a 100-point scale.; Sources: "ESPN". ESPN.; "2017 Team Ranking". Rivals.

== Roster ==
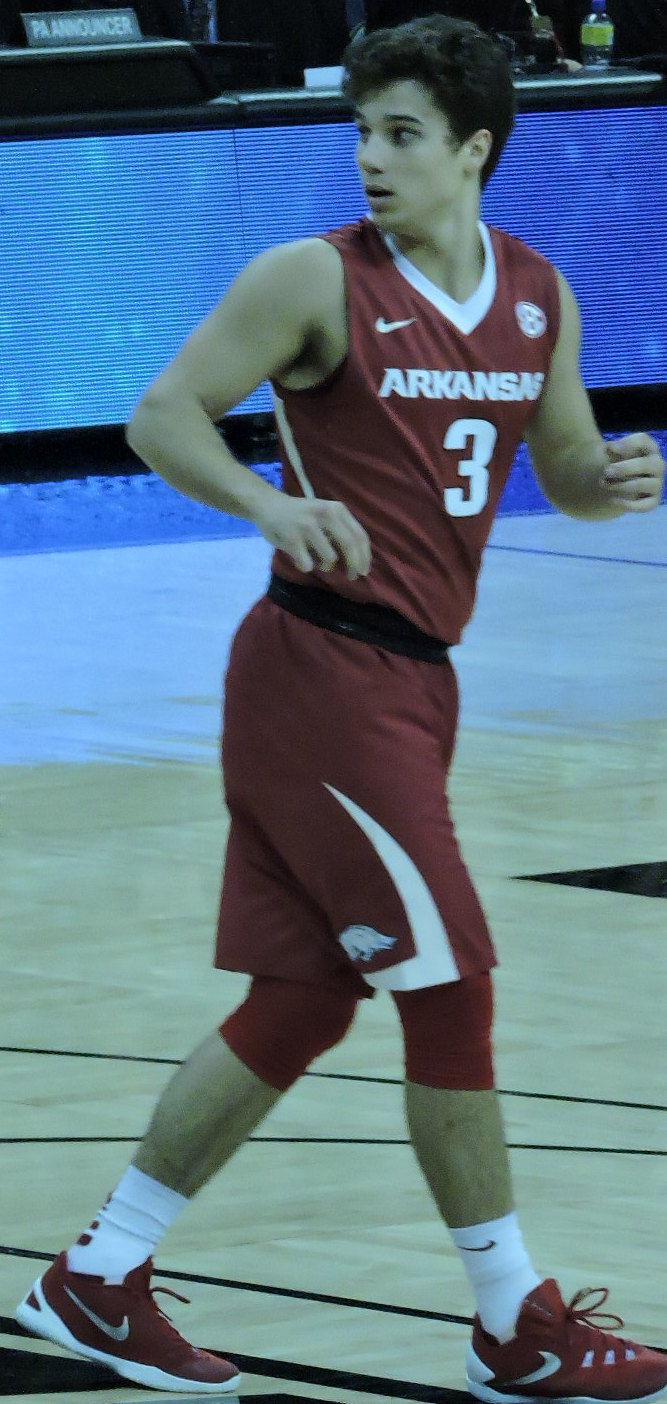
Dusty Hannahs

2015–16 Arkansas Razorbacks men's basketball team
Players
Coaches

| Pos. | # | Name | Height | Weight | Year | Hometown |
|---|---|---|---|---|---|---|
| F | 1 | Trey Thompson | 6 ft 9 in (2.06 m) | 260 lb (118 kg) | So | Madison, Arkansas |
| G | 2 | Jake Mosiman | 6 ft 0 in (1.83 m) | 185 lb (84 kg) | Jr | Lawrence, Kansas |
| G | 3 | Dusty Hannahs | 6 ft 3 in (1.91 m) | 203 lb (92 kg) | RS Jr | Little Rock, Arkansas |
| G | 4 | Jabril Durham | 6 ft 1 in (1.85 m) | 185 lb (84 kg) | Sr | DeSoto, Texas |
| G | 5 | Anthlon Bell | 6 ft 3 in (1.91 m) | 185 lb (84 kg) | Sr | Bartlett, Tennessee |
| F | 13 | Dustin Thomas (redshirt) | 6 ft 7 in (2.01 m) | 225 lb (102 kg) | Jr | Texarkana, Texas |
| G | 14 | Tristan Simmons | 5 ft 10 in (1.78 m) | 170 lb (77 kg) | Fr | El Dorado, Arkansas |
| G | 15 | Lorenzo Jenkins | 6 ft 7 in (2.01 m) | 210 lb (95 kg) | Fr | Naples, Florida |
| G | 21 | Manuale Watkins | 6 ft 3 in (1.91 m) | 208 lb (94 kg) | Jr | Fayetteville, Arkansas |
| G | 24 | Jimmy Whitt | 6 ft 4 in (1.93 m) | 173 lb (78 kg) | Fr | Columbia, Missouri |
| G | 31 | Anton Beard | 6 ft 0 in (1.83 m) | 195 lb (88 kg) | So | North Little Rock, Arkansas |
| C | 33 | Moses Kingsley | 6 ft 10 in (2.08 m) | 230 lb (104 kg) | Jr | Abuja, Nigeria |
| F | 50 | Willy Kouassi | 6 ft 10 in (2.08 m) | 230 lb (104 kg) | RS Sr | Abidjan, Ivory Coast |
| F | 55 | Keaton Miles | 6 ft 7 in (2.01 m) | 212 lb (96 kg) | RS Sr | Dallas, Texas |

Head coach

- Mike Anderson (Tulsa)

Assistant coach(es)

- Melvin Watkins (Charlotte)
- T. J. Cleveland (Arkansas)
- Matt Zimmerman (Arkansas)

Legend

- (C) Team captain
- (S) Suspended
- (I) Ineligible
- (W) Walk-on
- Injured
- Current redshirt

Roster
Last update: 2016-01-13

== Schedule and results ==
| Date time, TV | Rank^{#} | Opponent^{#} | Result | Record | High points | High rebounds | High assists | Site (attendance) city, state |
Non-conference exhibition
| November 5, 2015*; 7:00 pm | | Southwestern Oklahoma State | W 103–58 | – | 21 – Bell | 10 – Kouassi | 9 – Durham | Bud Walton Arena (13,996); Fayetteville, AR |
| November 10, 2015*; 7:00 pm | | Delta State | W 74–40 | – | 16 – Kingsley | 9 – Miles | 7 – Durham | Bud Walton Arena (13,970); Fayetteville, AR |
Regular season
| November 13, 2015*; 7:00 pm | | Southern | W 86–68 | 1–0 | 22 – Kingsley | 12 – Kingsley | 10 – Durham | Bud Walton Arena (14,158); Fayetteville, AR |
| November 18, 2015*; 7:00 pm | | Akron; NIT Season Tip-Off | L 80–88 | 1–1 | 23 – Bell | 12 – Kingsley | 4 – Durham | Bud Walton Arena (14,041); Fayetteville, AR |
| November 20, 2015*; 7:00 pm | | Charleston Southern; NIT Season Tip-Off | W 93–75 | 2–1 | 21 – Hannahs | 6 – Tied | 11 – Durham | Bud Walton Arena (14,203); Fayetteville, AR |
| November 26, 2015*; 1:00 pm, ESPNU | | vs. Georgia Tech; NIT Season Tip-Off semifinals | L 73–83 | 2–2 | 14 – Bell | 9 – Kingsley | 6 – Durham | Barclays Center (1,283); Brooklyn, NY |
| November 27, 2015*; 11:30 am, ESPNU | | vs. Stanford; NIT Season Tip-Off 3rd place game | L 66–69 | 2–3 | 17 – Bell | 12 – Kingsley | 7 – Durham | Barclays Center (4,156); Brooklyn, NY |
| December 1, 2015*; 7:00 pm | | Northwestern State | W 117–78 | 3–3 | 21 – Tied | 10 – Kingsley | 10 – Durham | Bud Walton Arena (13,984); Fayetteville, AR |
| December 4, 2015*; 6:00 pm, ESPN3 | | at Wake Forest | L 85–88 | 3–4 | 15 – Tied | 7 – Kingsley | 8 – Durham | LJVM Coliseum (9,488); Winston-Salem, NC |
| December 8, 2015*; 8:00 pm, SECN | | Evansville | W 89–76 | 4–4 | 23 – Hannahs | 9 – Durham | 7 – Durham | Bud Walton Arena (13,980); Fayetteville, AR |
| December 12, 2015*; 7:00 pm, SECN | | Tennessee Tech | W 83–57 | 5–4 | 21 – Tied | 13 – Kingsley | 10 – Durham | Bud Walton Arena (14,336); Fayetteville, AR |
| December 19, 2015*; 7:00 pm | | vs. Mercer | L 66–69 ^{OT} | 5–5 | 18 – Kingsley | 14 – Kingsley | 5 – Durham | Verizon Arena (9,120); North Little Rock, AR |
| December 22, 2015*; 7:00 pm | | North Florida | W 97–72 | 6–5 | 22 – Kingsley | 10 – Kingsley | 7 – Durham | Bud Walton Arena (14,794); Fayetteville, AR |
| December 30, 2015*; 8:00 pm, CBSSN | | at Dayton | L 81–85 ^{OT} | 6–6 | 26 – Kingsley | 11 – Kingsley | 5 – Tied | UD Arena (13,455); Dayton, OH |
| January 2, 2016; 3:30 pm, SECN | | at No. 20 Texas A&M | L 69–92 | 6–7 (1–0) | 16 – Bell | 7 – Kingsley | 5 – Durham | Reed Arena (11,332); College Station, TX |
| January 5, 2016; 8:00 pm, SECN | | Vanderbilt | W 90–85 ^{OT} | 7–7 (1–1) | 26 – Bell | 8 – Kingsley | 6 – Durham | Bud Walton Arena (14,179); Fayetteville, AR |
| January 9, 2016; 2:30 pm, SECN | | Mississippi State | W 82–68 | 8–7 (2–1) | 26 – Hannahs | 8 – Kingsley | 12 – Durham | Bud Walton Arena (16,246); Fayetteville, AR |
| January 12, 2016; 8:00 pm, SECN | | at Missouri | W 94–61 | 9–7 (3–1) | 24 – Kingsley | 5 – Kingsley | 6 – Durham | Mizzou Arena (6,627); Columbia, MO |
| January 16, 2016; 7:30 pm, SECN | | at LSU | L 74–76 | 9–8 (3–2) | 19 – Bell | 8 – Kingsley | 6 – Durham | Maravich Center (13,610); Baton Rouge, LA |
| January 21, 2016; 6:00 pm, ESPN | | No. 23 Kentucky | L 66–80 | 9–9 (3–3) | 20 – Hannahs | 6 – Kingsley | 5 – Durham | Bud Walton Arena (18,588); Fayetteville, AR |
| January 23, 2016; 5:00 pm, SECN | | at Georgia | L 73–76 ^{OT} | 9–10 (3–4) | 24 – Hannahs | 11 – Kingsley | 6 – Durham | Stegeman Coliseum (10,523); Athens, GA |
| January 27, 2016; 6:00 pm, ESPNU | | No. 5 Texas A&M | W 74–71 | 10–10 (4–4) | 18 – Kingsley | 11 – Kingsley | 7 – Durham | Bud Walton Arena (14,410); Fayetteville, AR |
| January 30, 2016*; 3:00 pm, ESPNU | | Texas Tech; Big 12/SEC Challenge | W 75–68 ^{OT} | 11–10 | 25 – Hannahs | 11 – Kingsley | 5 – Durham | Bud Walton Arena (15,975); Fayetteville, AR |
| February 3, 2016; 6:00 pm, SECN | | at Florida | L 83–87 | 11–11 (4–5) | 24 – Bell | 9 – Kingsley | 4 – Durham | O'Connell Center (9,013); Gainesville, FL |
| February 6, 2016; 7:00 pm, SECN | | Tennessee | W 85–67 | 12–11 (5–5) | 17 – Kingsley | 5 – Tied | 4 – Durham, Beard | Bud Walton Arena (15,970); Fayetteville, AR |
| February 9, 2016; 8:00 pm, SECN | | at Mississippi State | L 46–78 | 12–12 (5–6) | 11 – Whitt | 8 – Miles | 1 – Tied | Humphrey Coliseum (6,272); Starkville, MS |
| February 13, 2016; 1:00 pm, ESPNU | | at Ole Miss | L 60–76 | 12–13 (5–7) | 19 – Kingsley | 13 – Kingsley | 3 – Durham, Beard | The Pavilion at Ole Miss (9,500); Oxford, MS |
| February 17, 2016; 6:00 pm, SECN | | Auburn | L 86–90 | 12–14 (5–8) | 21 – Bell | 10 – Kingsley | 10 – Durham | Bud Walton Arena (14,351); Fayetteville, AR |
| February 20, 2016; 6:30 pm, SECN | | Missouri | W 84–72 | 13–14 (6–8) | 22 – Hannahs | 12 – Kingsley | 6 – Durham | Bud Walton Arena (16,617); Fayetteville, AR |
| February 23, 2016; 6:00 pm, ESPNU | | LSU | W 85–65 | 14–14 (7–8) | 21 – Kingsley | 12 – Kingsley | 6 – Durham | Bud Walton Arena (15,767); Fayetteville, AR |
| February 27, 2016; 6:30 pm, SECN | | at Tennessee | W 75–65 | 15–14 (8–8) | 17 – Hannahs | 8 – Kingsley | 4 – Kingsley | Thompson–Boling Arena (14,413); Knoxville, TN |
| March 2, 2016; 8:00 pm, SECN | | at Alabama | W 62–61 | 16–14 (9–8) | 19 – Kingsley | 8 – Kingsley | 3 – Durham, Miles | Coleman Coliseum (11,533); Tuscaloosa, AL |
| March 5, 2016; 4:00 pm, SECN | | South Carolina | L 61–76 | 16–15 (9–9) | 16 – Bell, Hannahs | 7 – Kingsley | 11 – Durham | Bud Walton Arena (17,106); Fayetteville, AR |
SEC Tournament
| March 10, 2016; 12:00 pm, SECN | (9) | (8) Florida; Second round | L 61–68 | 16–16 | 33 – Hannahs | 14 – Kingsley | 6 – Durham | Bridgestone Arena (12,270); Nashville, TN |
*Non-conference game. ^{#}Rankings from AP poll. (#) Tournament seedings in parentheses. All times are in Central Time.

Source: 2015–16 Schedule
