= 2015–16 Southeastern Conference men's basketball season =

2015–16 SEC Men's Basketball Season
- League: NCAA Division I
- Sport: Basketball
- Teams: 14
- TV partner(s): CBS, ESPN, SEC Network

Regular Season
- 2016 SEC Champions: Kentucky and Texas A&M
- Season MVP: Tyler Ulis, Kentucky
- Top scorer: Stefan Moody

Tournament
- Venue: Bridgestone Arena, Nashville, Tennessee
- Champions: Kentucky
- Runners-up: Texas A&M
- Finals MVP: Tyler Ulis, Kentucky

Basketball seasons
- ← 2014–15 2016–17 →

2015–16 Southeastern Conference men's basketball standings
	Conf.				Overall
Team	W		L	PCT	W		L	PCT
No. 15 Texas A&M	13	–	5	.722	28	–	9	.757
No. 10 Kentucky †	13	–	5	.722	27	–	9	.750
South Carolina	11	–	7	.611	25	–	9	.735
Vanderbilt	11	–	7	.611	19	–	14	.576
LSU	11	–	7	.611	19	–	14	.576
Ole Miss	10	–	8	.556	20	–	12	.625
Georgia	10	–	8	.556	20	–	14	.588
Florida	9	–	9	.500	21	–	15	.583
Arkansas	9	–	9	.500	16	–	16	.500
Alabama	8	–	10	.444	18	–	15	.545
Mississippi State	7	–	11	.389	14	–	17	.452
Tennessee	6	–	12	.333	15	–	19	.441
Auburn	5	–	13	.278	11	–	20	.355
Missouri^{*}	3	–	15	.167	10	–	21	.323
† 2016 SEC tournament winner^{*}Ineligible for postseason play due to self-imposed postseason ban. Rankings from AP poll

The 2015–16 SEC men's basketball season began with practices in October 2015, followed by the start of the 2015–16 NCAA Division I men's basketball season in November. Conference play started in early January 2016 and concluding in March, after which 13 member teams had participated in the 2016 SEC tournament at Bridgestone Arena in Nashville, Tennessee, with the tournament champion being guaranteed selection to the 2016 NCAA tournament.

== Preseason ==
SEC recruits at the 2015 McDonald's All-American Boys Game

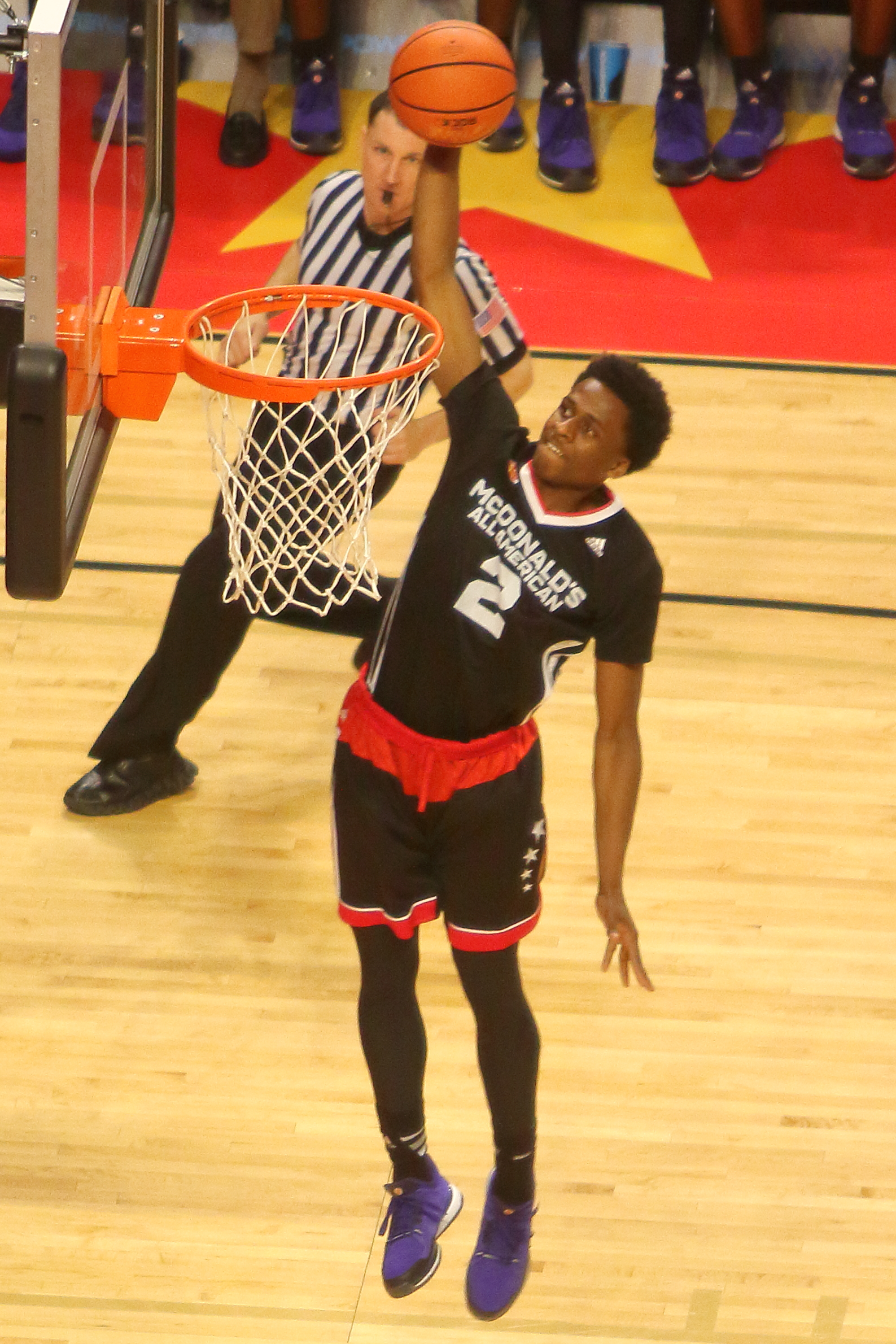
Antonio Blakeney, LSU

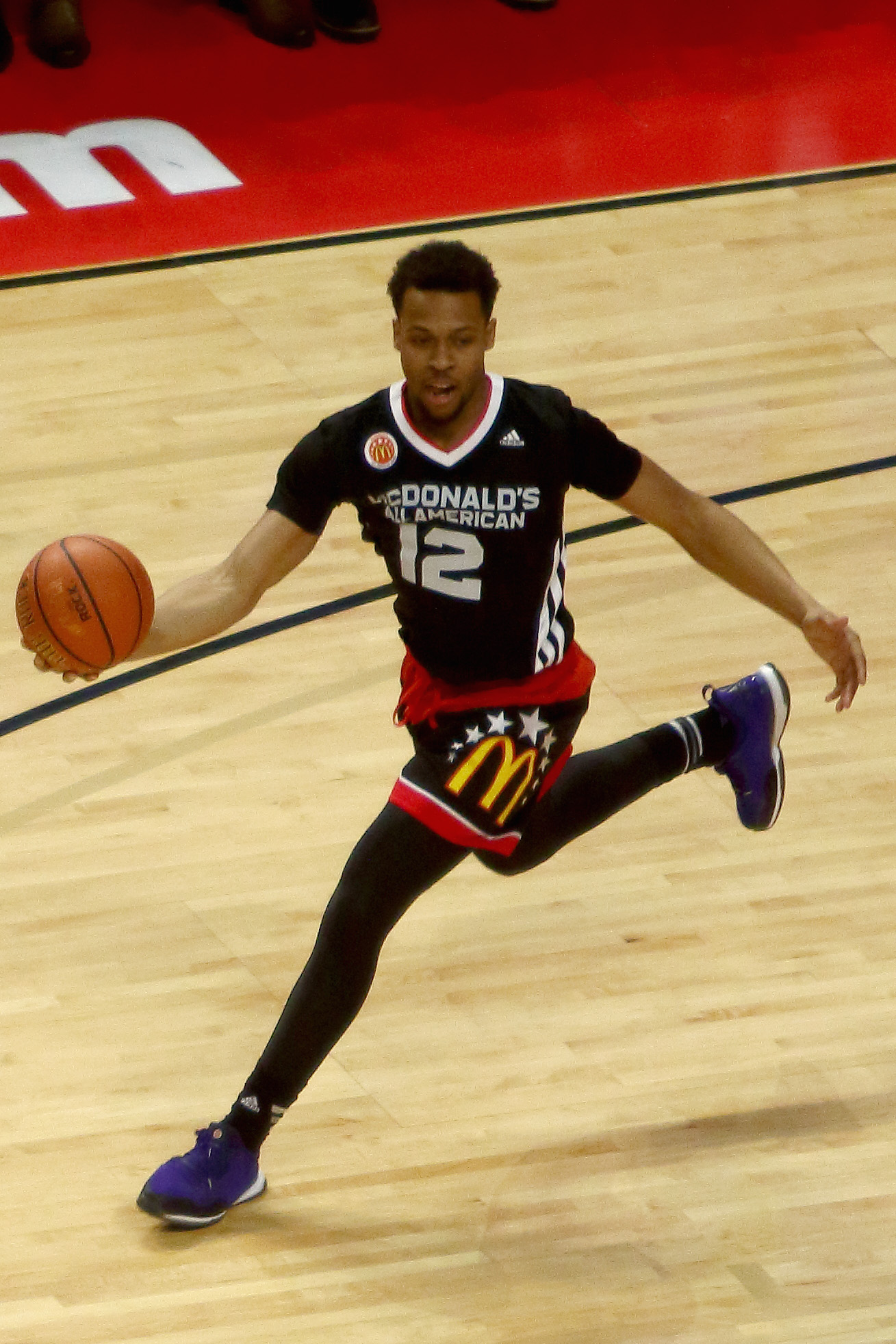
Isaiah Briscoe, Kentucky

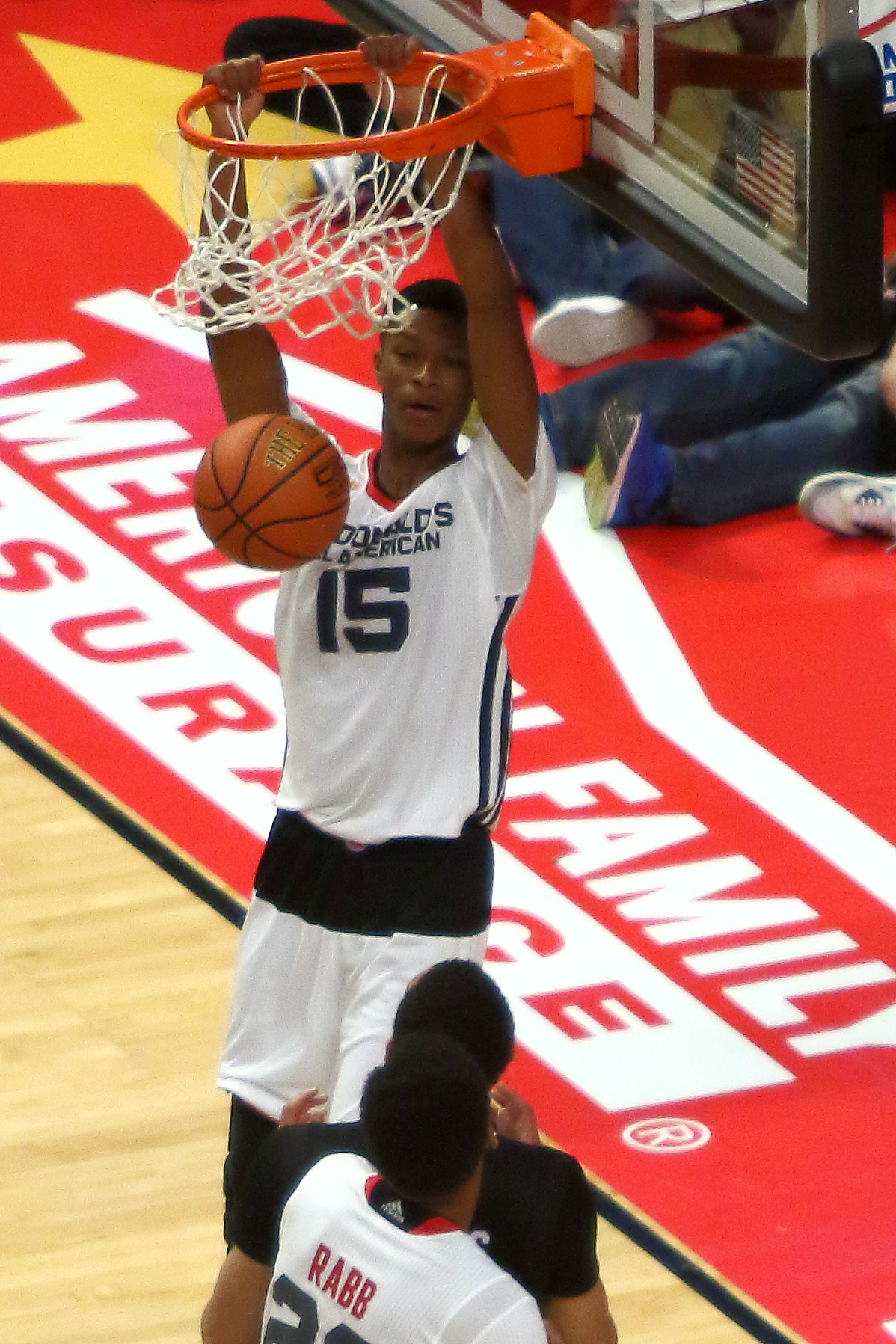
PJ Dozier, South Carolina

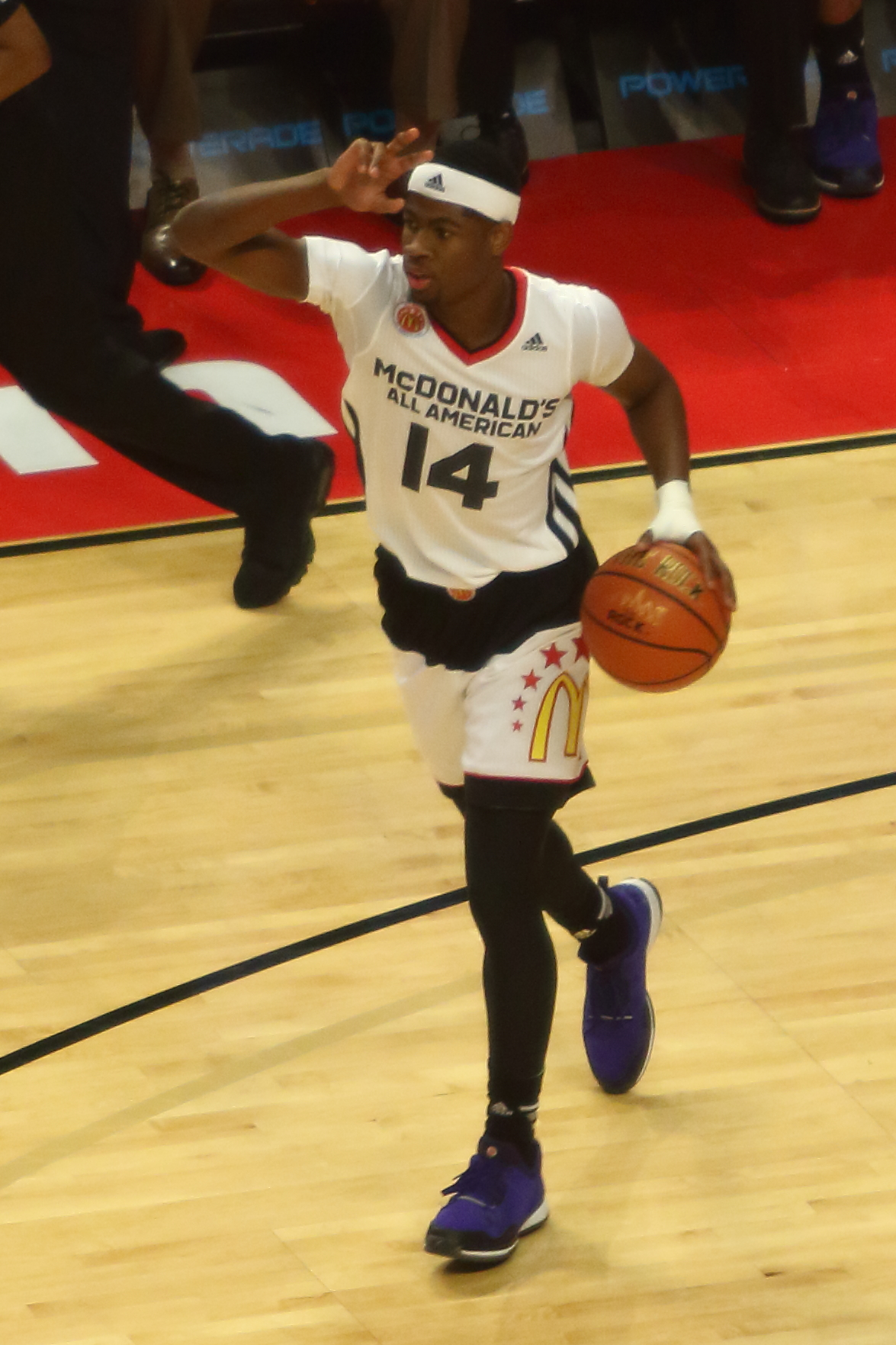
Malik Newman, Mississippi State

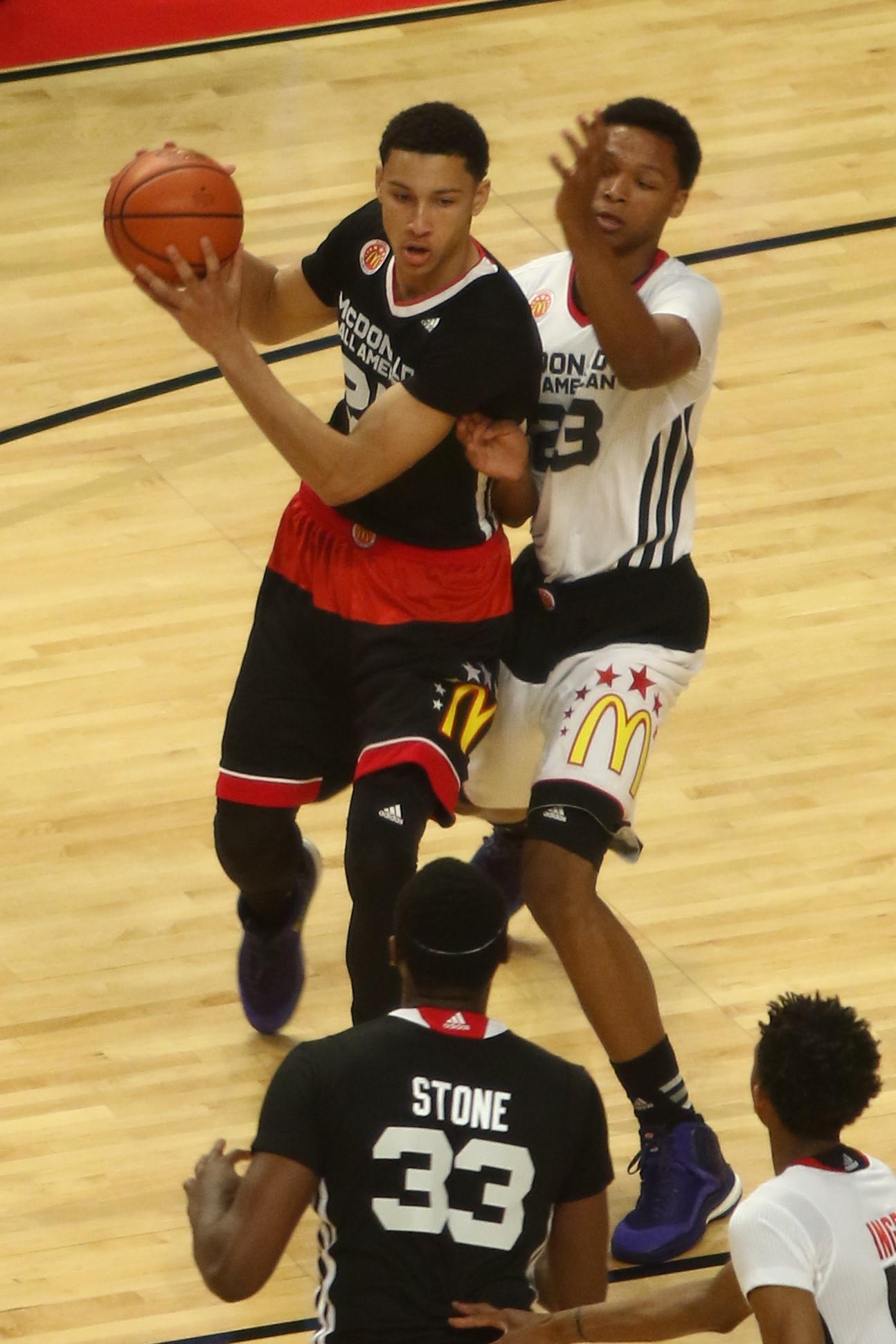
Ben Simmons, LSU

On March 15, 2015, Anthony Grant was fired from Alabama. On April 5, 2015, ESPN reported that Avery Johnson had verbally agreed to become the new head basketball coach at the University of Alabama, replacing Grant. The following day, the university officially announced Johnson's hiring.

On March 21, 2015 Rick Ray was fired by Mississippi State. On March 24, 2015, Ben Howland was hired as the 20th head coach of Mississippi State replacing Ray.

On March 27, 2015, Tennessee fired Donnie Tyndall after the NCAA notified Tennessee officials of possible NCAA violations at Southern Miss. The violations centered around improper financial aid for two players, as well as academic problems with junior college transfers. According to a copy of Tyndall's termination letter, Tyndall had lied to Tennessee officials about the extent of the violations on several occasions, and had also deleted several emails from an old email account even though he was aware he would have been questioned about activity on that account by the NCAA. At a press conference announcing Tyndall's firing, athletics director Dave Hart said that he would have never hired Tyndall had the true extent of the violations at Southern Miss been known. Texas head coach Rick Barnes was named Tyndall's replacement.

On April 30, 2015, Billy Donovan agreed to a $30 million, multi-year deal to coach the Oklahoma City Thunder, replacing Scott Brooks who previously coached the Thunder for seven seasons. On May 7, 2015, Louisiana Tech head coach Mike White was named as Donovan's replacement.

=== Media Day selections ===
	Media
1.	Kentucky
2.	Vanderbilt
3.	Texas A&M
4.	LSU
5.	Georgia
6.	Florida
7.	South Carolina
8.	Mississippi State
9.	Ole Miss
10.	Auburn
11.	Arkansas
12.	Tennessee
13.	Alabama
14.	Missouri

() first place votes

=== Preseason All-SEC teams ===
Media
Danuel House Texas A&M
Damian Jones Vanderbilt
Skal Labissière Kentucky
Stefan Moody Ole Miss
**Ben Simmons LSU**
Tyler Ulis Kentucky

- Coaches select 8 players
- Players in bold are choices for SEC Player of the Year

== Head coaches ==
Note: Stats shown are before the beginning of the season. Overall and SEC records are from time at current school.

Team	Head coach	Previous job	Seasons at school	Overall record	SEC record	NCAA Tournaments	NCAA Final Fours	NCAA Championships
Alabama	Avery Johnson	Brooklyn Nets	1st	0–0	0–0	0	0	0
Arkansas	Mike Anderson	Missouri	5th	86–48	39–31	1	0	0
Auburn	Bruce Pearl	Tennessee	2nd	15–20	4–14	0	0	0
Florida	Mike White	Louisiana Tech	1st	0–0	0–0	0	0	0
Georgia	Mark Fox	Nevada	7th	105–88	51–51	2	0	0
Kentucky	John Calipari	Memphis	7th	190–38	82–20	5	4	1
LSU	Johnny Jones	North Texas	4th	61–37	29–25	1	0	0
Mississippi State	Ben Howland	UCLA	1st	0–0	0–0	0	0	0
Missouri	Kim Anderson	Central Missouri	2nd	9–23	3–15	0	0	0
Ole Miss	Andy Kennedy	Cincinnati	10th	192–114	78–72	2	0	0
South Carolina	Frank Martin	Kansas State	4th	64–56	21–41	0	0	0
Tennessee	Rick Barnes	Texas	1st	0–0	0–0	0	0	0
Texas A&M	Billy Kennedy	Murray State	5th	71–61	26–28	0	0	0
Vanderbilt	Kevin Stallings	Illinois State	17th	313–206	127–135	6	0	0

== Rankings ==
Legend
Increase in ranking
Decrease in ranking
Not ranked previous week

		Pre	Wk 2	Wk 3	Wk 4	Wk 5	Wk 6	Wk 7	Wk 8	Wk 9	Wk 10	Wk 11	Wk 12	Wk 13	Wk 14	Wk 15	Wk 16	Wk 17	Wk 18	Wk 19	Final
Alabama	AP																				
Alabama	C																				
Arkansas	AP																				
Arkansas	C																			RV	RV
Auburn	AP																				
Auburn	C																				
Florida	AP					RV	RV	RV	RV			RV									
Florida	C				RV	RV	RV	RV	RV			RV									
Georgia	AP																				
Georgia	C																				
Kentucky	AP	2	2	1	1	5	4	12	10	9	14	23	20	20	22	14	16	22	16	10	
Kentucky	C	1	2	1	1	4	4	11	11	8	13	19	19	19	21	14	14	19	16	13	16
LSU	AP	21	23	22	RV																
LSU	C	19	19	17	RV	RV	RV					RV	RV		RV	RV	RV				
Mississippi State	AP																				
Mississippi State	C																				
Missouri	AP																				
Missouri	C																				
Ole Miss	AP																				
Ole Miss	C																				
South Carolina	AP				RV	RV	RV	25	24	22	19	24	RV	25	RV	RV	RV				
South Carolina	C				RV	RV	25	23	20	20	15	23	22	23	20	23	RV	RV	RV		
Tennessee	AP																				
Tennessee	C																				
Texas A&M	AP	RV	RV	25	18	RV	24	21	20	21	15	10	5	8	15	RV	21	20			
Texas A&M	C	RV	RV	RV	20	25	24	19	19	17	14	8	5	8	13	24	21	18	17	15	
Vanderbilt	AP	18	17	19	16	21	RV	RV	RV									RV			
Vanderbilt	C	20	17	16	13	16	23	25	RV												

== SEC regular season ==
On January 13, 2016, Missouri announced that it would not participate in any postseason play in 2016, including the SEC Tournament. At the time, the Tigers were facing an NCAA investigation into major rules violations that occurred under the tenure of former head coach Frank Haith.

=== Conference matrix ===
This table summarizes the head-to-head results between teams in conference play.

	Alabama	Arkansas	Auburn	Florida	Georgia	Kentucky	LSU	Mississippi State	Missouri	Ole Miss	South Carolina	Tennessee	Texas A&M	Vanderbilt
vs. Alabama	–	1–0	1–1	0–1	1–0	2–0	1–1	1–1	0–1	1–0	1–1	1–0	0–1	1–0
vs. Arkansas	0–1	–	1–0	1–0	1–0	1–0	1–1	1–1	0–2	1–0	1–0	0–2	1–0	0–1
vs. Auburn	1–1	0–1	–	1–0	1–1	0–1	1–0	1–0	1–0	2–0	1–0	1–1	1–0	2–0
vs. Florida	1–0	0–1	0–1	–	0–2	2–0	1–1	0–1	0–0	0–2	1–0	1–0	1–0	2–0
vs. Georgia	0–1	0–1	0–2	2–0	–	1–0	1–0	0–1	0–2	1–1	0–2	0–1	1–0	1–0
vs. Kentucky	0–2	0–1	1–0	0–2	0–1	–	1–1	0–1	0–1	0–1	0–1	1–1	1–0	1–1
vs. LSU	1–1	1–1	0–1	1–1	0–1	1–1	–	0–1	0–1	0–1	1–0	1–0	1–1	0–1
vs. Miss. State	1–1	1–1	0–1	1–0	1–0	1–0	1–0	–	0–1	0–2	1–1	1–0	2–0	0–1
vs. Missouri	1–0	2–0	0–1	1–0	2–0	1–0	1–0	1–0	–	2–0	1–1	0–1	2–0	1–0
vs. Ole Miss	0–1	0–1	0–2	2–0	1–1	1–0	1–0	2–0	0–2	–	1–0	0–1	1–0	0–1
vs. South Carolina	1–1	0–1	0–1	0–1	2–0	1–0	0–1	1–1	1–1	0–1	–	1–1	0–1	0–1
vs. Tennessee	1–0	2–0	1–1	0–1	1–0	1–1	0–1	0–1	1–0	1–0	1–1	–	1–0	2–0
vs. Texas A&M	1–0	1–1	0–1	0–1	0–1	0–1	1–1	0–2	0–2	0–1	1–0	0–1	–	1–1
vs. Vanderbilt	0–1	1–0	0–2	0–2	0–1	1–1	1–0	1–0	0–1	1–0	1–0	0–2	1–1	–
Total	8–10	9–9	5–13	9–9	10–8	13–5	11–7	7–11	3–15	10–8	11–7	6–12	13–5	11–7

== Postseason ==
=== SEC Tournament ===
The conference tournament is scheduled for Wednesday–Sunday, March 9–13, 2016 at the Bridgestone Arena, Nashville, Tennessee. Teams will be seeded by conference record, with ties broken by record between the tied teams followed by record against the regular-season champion, if necessary.

The tournament involved only 13 teams after Missouri self-imposed a postseason ban.

2016 SEC men's basketball tournament seeds and results
Seed	School	Conf.	Over.	Tiebreaker	First round March 9	Second round March 10	Quarterfinals March 11	Semifinals March 12	Championship March 13
1.	‡Texas A&M	13–5	24–7	1–0 vs. Kentucky	Bye	Bye	vs. #8 Florida; W, 72–66	vs. #4 LSU; W, 71–38	vs. #2 Kentucky; L, 77–82^{OT}
2.	†Kentucky	13–5	23–8	0–1 vs. Texas A&M	Bye	Bye	vs. #10 Alabama; W, 85–59	vs. #6 Georgia; W, 93–80	vs. #1 Texas A&M; W, 82–77^{OT}
3.	†South Carolina	11–7	24–7	2–0 vs. LSU/Vanderbilt	Bye	Bye	vs. #6 Georgia; L, 64–65		
4.	†LSU	11–7	18–13	1–1 vs. S. Carolina/Vanderbilt	Bye	Bye	vs. #12 Tennessee; W, 84–75	vs. #1 Texas A&M; L, 38–71	
5.	#Vanderbilt	11–7	19–13	0–2 vs. South Carolina/LSU	Bye	vs. #12 Tennessee; L, 65–67			
6.	#Georgia	10–8	17–12	2–0 vs. South Carolina	Bye	vs. #11 Mississippi State; W, 79–69	vs. #3 South Carolina; W, 65–64	vs. #2 Kentucky; L, 80–93	
7.	Ole Miss	10–8	20–11	0–1 vs. South Carolina	Bye	vs. #10 Alabama; L, 73–81			
8.	#Florida	9–9	19–13	1–0 vs. Arkansas	Bye	vs. #9 Arkansas; W, 68-61	vs. #1 Texas A&M; L, 66-72		
9.	#Arkansas	9–9	16–16	0–1 vs. Florida	Bye	vs. #8 Florida; L, 61-68			
10.	#Alabama	8–10	17–13		Bye	vs. #7 Ole Miss; W, 83-71'	vs. #2 Kentucky; L, 59-85		
11.	#Mississippi St.	7–11	14–16		Bye	vs. #6 Georgia; L, 69-79			
12.	Tennessee	6–12	15–18		vs. #13 Auburn; W, 97–59	vs. #5 Vanderbilt; W, 67–65	vs. #4 LSU; L, 75-84		
13.	Auburn	5–13	11–19		vs. #12 Tennessee; L, 59–97				
‡ – SEC regular season champions, and tournament No. 1 seed. † – Received a double-Bye in the conference tournament. # – Received a single-Bye in the conference tournament. Overall records include all games played in the SEC tournament.

=== NCAA tournament ===
Seed	Region	School	First Four	First round	Second round	Sweet 16	Elite Eight	Final Four	Championship
3	West	Texas A&M		vs. #14 Green Bay; W, 92–65 (Oklahoma City)	vs. #11 Northern Iowa; W, 92–88 (Oklahoma City)	vs. #2 Oklahoma; L 63–77 (Anaheim)			
4	East	Kentucky		vs. #13 Stony Brook; W, 85–67 (Des Moines)	vs. #5 Indiana; L, 67–73 (Des Moines)				
11	South	Vanderbilt	vs. #11 Wichita State; L, 50–70 (Dayton)						
	3 Bids	W-L (%):	0–1 .000	2–0 1.000	1–1 .500	0–1 .000	0–0 –	0–0 –	TOTAL: 3–3 .500

=== National Invitation Tournament ===
Seed	Bracket	School	First round	Second round	Quarterfinals	Semifinals	Finals
1	South Carolina/San Diego State Quadrant	South Carolina	vs. #8 High Point; W, 88–66 (Columbia)	vs. #4 Georgia Tech (Columbia)			
2	Monmouth/Florida Quadrant	Florida	vs. #7 North Florida; W, 97–68 (Jacksonville)	vs. #3 Ohio State; W, 74–66 (Columbus)	vs. #4 George Washington; L, 77–82 (Washington D.C.)		
3	Valparaiso/Saint Mary's Quadrant	Georgia	vs. #6 Belmont; W, 93–84 (Athens)	vs. #2 St. Mary's; L, 65–77 (Moraga)			
5	St. Bonaventure/BYU Quadrant	Alabama	vs. #4 Creighton; L, 54–72 (Omaha)				
	4 Bids	W-L (%):	3–1 .750	1–2 .333	0–1 .000	0–0 –	TOTAL: 4–4 .500

=== NBA draft ===
PG	Point guard	SG	Shooting guard	SF	Small forward	PF	Power forward	C	Center

Player	Team	Round	Pick #	Position	School	Nationality
Ben Simmons	Philadelphia 76ers	1	1	PF/PG	LSU	Australia
Jamal Murray	Denver Nuggets	1	7	PG/SG	Kentucky	Canada
Wade Baldwin IV	Memphis Grizzlies	1	17	PG	Vanderbilt	United States
Skal Labissière	Phoenix Suns	1	28	PF/C	Kentucky	Haiti
Damian Jones	Golden State Warriors	1	30	C	Vanderbilt	United States
Tyler Ulis	Phoenix Suns	2	34	PG	Kentucky	United States

== Honors and awards ==
=== All-Americans ===
Starting on March 6, the 2016 NCAA Men's Basketball All-Americans were released for 2015–16 season, based upon selections by the four major syndicates. The four syndicates include the Associated Press, USBWA, NABC, and Sporting News.

AP

First Team

USBWA

First Team

- Ben Simmons, LSU

Second Team

- Tyler Ulis, Kentucky
NABC

First Team

Sporting News

First Team

- Tyler Ulis, Kentucky

Second Team

- Ben Simmons, LSU

=== All-SEC awards and teams ===
==== Coaches ====
2016 SEC Men's Basketball Individual Awards
Award	Recipient(s)
Player of the Year	Tyler Ulis, So., G, Kentucky
Coach of the Year	Billy Kennedy, Texas A&M
Defensive Player of the Year	Tyler Ulis, So., G, Kentucky
Freshman of the Year	Ben Simmons, F, LSU
Scholar-Athlete of the Year	Retin Obasohan, Sr., G, Alabama
Sixth Man Award	Duane Notice, Jr., G, South Carolina

2016 SEC Men's Basketball All-Conference Teams
First Team	Second Team	All-Freshman Team	All-Defensive Team
Michael Carrera Sr., F, South Carolina; Jalen Jones Sr., F, Texas A&M; Damian Jones Jr., F, Vanderbilt; Stefan Moody Sr., G, Ole Miss; Jamal Murray Fr., G, Kentucky; Ben Simmons Fr., F, LSU; Retin Obasohan Sr., G, Alabama; Tyler Ulis So., G, Kentucky	Wade Baldwin So., G, Vanderbilt; Alex Caruso Sr., F, Texas A&M; Dorian Finney-Smith Sr., F, Florida; J. J. Frazier Sr., G, Georgia; Danuel House Sr., F, Texas A&M; Moses Kingsley Jr., C, Arkansas; Yante Maten So., F, Georgia; Kevin Punter Jr., G, Tennessee	KeVaughn Allen Florida; Antonio Blakeney LSU; Tyler Davis Texas A&M; D. J. Hogg Texas A&M; Jamal Murray Kentucky; Kevin Puryear Missouri; Ben Simmons LSU; Quinndary Weatherspoon Miss. State	Alex Caruso Sr., F, Texas A&M; Luke Kornet Jr., F, Vanderbilt; Moses Kingsley Jr., C, Arkansas; Retin Obasohan Sr., G, Alabama; Sindarius Thornwell Jr., G, South Carolina; Tyler Ulis So., G, Kentucky
† - denotes unanimous selection
