= 2015–16 South Carolina Gamecocks men's basketball team =

American college basketball season

2015–16 South Carolina Gamecocks men's basketball

Paradise Jam Tournament champions

NIT, Second Round
- Conference: Southeastern Conference
- Record: 25–9 (11–7 SEC)
- Head coach: Frank Martin (4th season)
- Assistant coaches: Matt Figger; Perry Clark; Lamont Evans
- Home arena: Colonial Life Arena

2015–16 Southeastern Conference men's basketball standings
	Conf.				Overall
Team	W		L	PCT	W		L	PCT
No. 15 Texas A&M	13	–	5	.722	28	–	9	.757
No. 10 Kentucky †	13	–	5	.722	27	–	9	.750
South Carolina	11	–	7	.611	25	–	9	.735
Vanderbilt	11	–	7	.611	19	–	14	.576
LSU	11	–	7	.611	19	–	14	.576
Ole Miss	10	–	8	.556	20	–	12	.625
Georgia	10	–	8	.556	20	–	14	.588
Florida	9	–	9	.500	21	–	15	.583
Arkansas	9	–	9	.500	16	–	16	.500
Alabama	8	–	10	.444	18	–	15	.545
Mississippi State	7	–	11	.389	14	–	17	.452
Tennessee	6	–	12	.333	15	–	19	.441
Auburn	5	–	13	.278	11	–	20	.355
Missouri^{*}	3	–	15	.167	10	–	21	.323
† 2016 SEC tournament winner^{*}Ineligible for postseason play due to self-imposed postseason ban. Rankings from AP poll

The 2015–16 South Carolina Gamecocks men's basketball team represented the University of South Carolina during the 2015–16 NCAA Division I men's basketball season. The team's head coach was Frank Martin who was in his fourth season at South Carolina. The team played their home games at Colonial Life Arena in Columbia, South Carolina as a member of the Southeastern Conference. They finished the season 25–9, 11–7 in SEC play to finish in a three-way tie for third place. They lost in the quarterfinals of the SEC tournament to Georgia. They were invited to the National Invitation Tournament where they defeated High Point in the first round to advance to the second round where they lost to Georgia Tech.

== Previous season ==
The Gamecocks finished the season 17–16, 6–12 in SEC play to finish in a tie for 11th place. They advanced to the quarterfinals of the SEC tournament where they lost to Georgia.

== Departures ==
Name	Number	Pos.	Height	Weight	Year	Hometown	Notes
Tyrone Johnson	4	G	6'3"	196	Senior	Plainfield, NJ	Graduated
Shamiek Sheppard	12	G/F	6'6"	215	Freshman	Brooklyn, NY	Suspended
Reggie Theus Jr.	15	F	6'6"	218	Sophomore	Los Angeles, CA	Transferred to Cal State Northridge
Demetrius Henry	21	F/C	6'9"	227	Sophomore	Miami, FL	Suspended
Austin Constable	31	G	5'11"	180	Junior	West Chester, PA	Left team

== Recruits ==
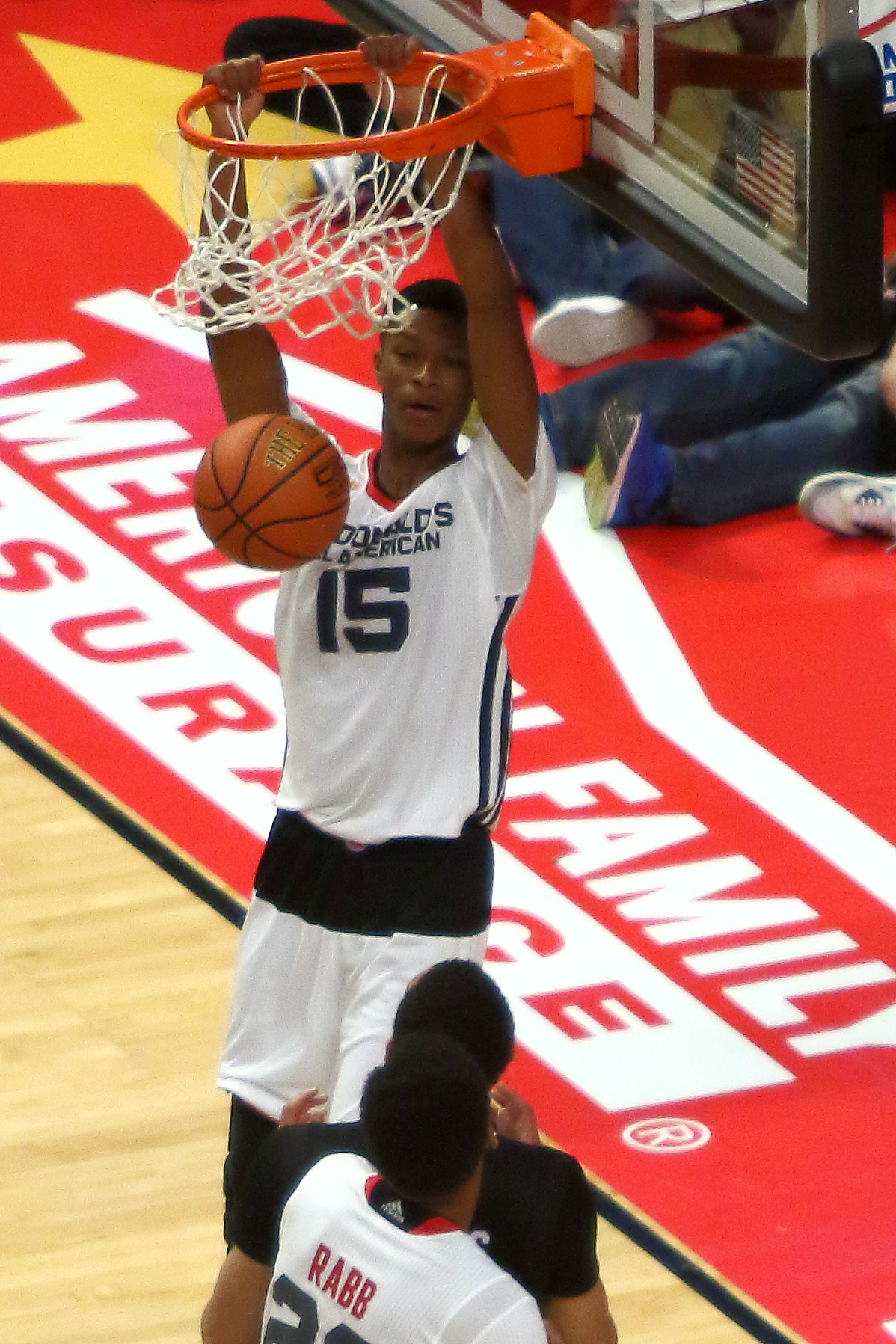
PJ Dozier at the 2015 McDonald's All-American Boys Game

College recruiting information
Name	Hometown	School	Height	Weight	Commit date
PJ Dozier; PG	Columbia, SC	Spring Valley High School	6 ft 6 in (1.98 m)	185 lb (84 kg)	Nov 12, 2014
PJ Dozier; PG	Recruit ratings: Scout: Rivals: 247Sports: ESPN:				
Chris Silva; PF	Roselle, NJ	Roselle Catholic High School	6 ft 8 in (2.03 m)	205 lb (93 kg)	Sep 19, 2014
Chris Silva; PF	Recruit ratings: Scout: Rivals: 247Sports: ESPN:				
Eric Cobb; C	Jacksonville, FL	Potters House Christian	6 ft 9 in (2.06 m)	245 lb (111 kg)	May 18, 2015
Eric Cobb; C	Recruit ratings: Scout: Rivals: 247Sports: ESPN:				
Ray Doby; PF	Saint Louis, MO	St. John's NW Military Academy	6 ft 7 in (2.01 m)	215 lb (98 kg)	Jun 7, 2015
Ray Doby; PF	Recruit ratings: Scout: Rivals: 247Sports: ESPN:				
Travon Bunch; C	Racine, WI	Score Sports Academy	6 ft 10 in (2.08 m)	186 lb (84 kg)	Mar 4, 2015
Travon Bunch; C	Recruit ratings: Scout: Rivals: 247Sports: ESPN:				
Jamall Gregory; SG	Washington, D.C.	Elev8 Basketball Academy	6 ft 3 in (1.91 m)	175 lb (79 kg)	Apr 1, 2015
Jamall Gregory; SG	Recruit ratings: Scout: Rivals: 247Sports: ESPN:				
Overall recruit ranking: Scout: 28 Rivals: 23 ESPN: 23
Note: In many cases, Scout, Rivals, 247Sports, On3, and ESPN may conflict in their listings of height and weight.; In these cases, the average was taken. ESPN grades are on a 100-point scale.; Sources: "South Carolina 2015 Basketball Commitments". Rivals.; "2015 South Carolina Basketball Commits". Scout.; "ESPN". ESPN.; "Scout.com Team Recruiting Rankings". Scout.; "2015 Team Ranking". Rivals.

== Roster ==
2015–16 South Carolina Gamecocks men's basketball team
Players
Coaches

Pos.	#	Name	Height	Weight	Year	Previous school	Hometown
G	0	Sindarius Thornwell	6 ft 5 in (1.96 m)	215 lb (98 kg)	Jr	Oak Hill Academy	Lancaster, SC
G	1	Marcus Stroman	6 ft 2 in (1.88 m)	183 lb (83 kg)	So	Keenan	Columbia, SC
F	2	Raymond Doby	6 ft 7 in (2.01 m)	230 lb (104 kg)	Fr	Montrose Christian School	Cahokia, IL
G	4	Jamall Gregory	6 ft 4 in (1.93 m)	180 lb (82 kg)	Fr	Coolidge HS	Washington, D.C.
G	5	TeMarcus Blanton	6 ft 5 in (1.96 m)	209 lb (95 kg)	RS Fr	Luella	Locust Grove, GA
G	10	Duane Notice	6 ft 2 in (1.88 m)	212 lb (96 kg)	Jr	St. Thomas More School	Woodbridge, ON
F	14	Laimonas Chatkevicius	6 ft 11 in (2.11 m)	251 lb (114 kg)	Sr	South Kent School	Klaipėda, Lithuania
G	15	PJ Dozier	6 ft 7 in (2.01 m)	185 lb (84 kg)	Fr	Spring Valley HS	Columbia, SC
G	20	Justin McKie	6 ft 4 in (1.93 m)	195 lb (88 kg)	Jr	Irmo HS	Columbia, SC
G	21	John Ragin (W)	6 ft 2 in (1.88 m)	160 lb (73 kg)	Fr	Cardinal Newman HS	Eastover, SC
F	23	Eric Cobb	6 ft 10 in (2.08 m)	275 lb (125 kg)	Fr	St. Francis Academy	Jacksonville, FL
F	24	Michael Carrera	6 ft 5 in (1.96 m)	212 lb (96 kg)	Sr	Montrose Christian School	Anzoátegui, Venezuela
F	25	Mindaugas Kacinas	6 ft 7 in (2.01 m)	227 lb (103 kg)	Sr	Word of Life School	Klaipėda, Lithuania
F	30	Chris Silva	6 ft 9 in (2.06 m)	205 lb (93 kg)	Fr	Roselle Catholic HS	Libreville, Gabon
F	31	Jarrell Holliman (W)	6 ft 8 in (2.03 m)	190 lb (86 kg)	RS So	Alpharetta HS; Elmhurst College	Alpharetta, GA
F	35	Brian Steele	6 ft 5 in (1.96 m)	195 lb (88 kg)	Sr	Wade Hampton HS	Greenville, SC

Head coach

- Frank Martin (FIU)

Assistant coach(es)

- Matt Figger (Eastern Kentucky)
- Perry Clark (Gettysburg)
- Lamont Evans (Kansas State)

Legend

- (C) Team captain
- (S) Suspended
- (I) Ineligible
- (W) Walk-on
- Injured
- Current redshirt

Roster

== Schedule ==
Date time, TV	Rank^{#}	Opponent^{#}	Result	Record	Site (attendance) city, state
Exhibition
November 8, 2015*; 4:00 pm		Allen	W 71–43	–	Colonial Life Arena; Columbia, SC
Non-conference games
November 14, 2015*; 7:00 pm		Norfolk State	W 84–69	1–0	Colonial Life Arena (10,623); Columbia, SC
November 16, 2015*; 7:30 pm, SECN		Oral Roberts	W 84–66	2–0	Colonial Life Arena (9,640); Columbia, SC
November 20, 2015*; 6:30 pm, CBSSN		vs. DePaul; Paradise Jam Quarterfinals	W 76–61	3–0	Sports and Fitness Center (N/A); St. Thomas, VI
November 22, 2015*; 9:00 pm, CBSSN		vs. Hofstra; Paradise Jam Semifinals	W 94–84	4–0	Sports and Fitness Center (N/A); St. Thomas, VI
November 23, 2015*; 9:00 pm, CBSSN		vs. Tulsa; Paradise Jam Championship	W 83–75	5–0	Sports and Fitness Center (2,002); St. Thomas, VI
November 27, 2015*; 2:00 pm		Lipscomb	W 92–76	6–0	Colonial Life Arena (8,793); Columbia, SC
November 30, 2015*; 7:00 pm, SECN		Western Carolina	W 76–53	7–0	Colonial Life Arena (8,957); Columbia, SC
December 5, 2015*; 4:00 pm, SECN		South Florida	W 81–63	8–0	Colonial Life Arena (10,721); Columbia, SC
December 15, 2015*; 7:00 pm		Drexel	W 79–54	9–0	Colonial Life Arena (8,481); Columbia, SC
December 18, 2015*; 7:00 pm, ESPN3		at Clemson; Rivalry	W 65–59	10–0	Bon Secours Wellness Arena (14,446); Greenville, SC
December 22, 2015*; 9:00 pm, CBSSN	No. 25	vs. St. John's; Mohegan Sun Showcase	W 75–61	11–0	Mohegan Sun Arena (2,355); Uncasville, CT
December 30, 2015*; 7:00 pm	No. 24	Francis Marion	W 78–56	12–0	Colonial Life Arena (10,401); Columbia, SC
January 2, 2016*; 6:00 pm, ESPNU	No. 24	Memphis	W 86–76	13–0	Colonial Life Arena (13,035); Columbia, SC
SEC regular season
January 5, 2016; 7:00 pm, SECN	No. 22	at Auburn	W 81–69	14–0 (1–0)	Auburn Arena (7,556); Auburn, AL
January 9, 2016; 3:00 pm, ESPNU	No. 22	Vanderbilt	W 69–65	15–0 (2–0)	Colonial Life Arena (15,055); Columbia, SC
January 13, 2016; 9:00 pm, SECN	No. 19	at Alabama	L 50–73	15–1 (2–1)	Coleman Coliseum (12,443); Tuscaloosa, AL
January 16, 2016; 1:00 pm, SECN	No. 19	Missouri	W 81–72	16–1 (3–1)	Colonial Life Arena (15,389); Columbia, SC
January 19, 2016; 7:00 pm, SECN	No. 24	at Ole Miss	W 77–74 ^{OT}	17–1 (4–1)	The Pavilion at Ole Miss (7,427); Oxford, MS
January 23, 2016; 12:00 pm, SECN	No. 24	at Tennessee	L 69–78	17–2 (4–2)	Thompson–Boling Arena (13,928); Knoxville, TN
January 26, 2016; 7:00 pm, SECN		Mississippi State	W 84–74	18–2 (5–2)	Colonial Life Arena (12,764); Columbia, SC
January 30, 2016; 6:00 pm, SECN		Alabama	W 78–64	19–2 (6–2)	Colonial Life Arena (18,000); Columbia, SC
February 2, 2016; 7:00 pm, ESPNU	No. 25	at Georgia	L 56–69	19–3 (6–3)	Stegeman Coliseum (6,427); Athens, GA
February 6, 2016; 4:00 pm, ESPNU	No. 25	at No. 8 Texas A&M	W 81–78	20–3 (7–3)	Reed Arena (11,240); College Station, TX
February 10, 2016; 7:00 pm, ESPN2		LSU	W 94–83	21–3 (8–3)	Colonial Life Arena (16,009); Columbia, SC
February 13, 2016; 12:00 pm, ESPN		No. 22 Kentucky	L 62–89	21–4 (8–4)	Colonial Life Arena (18,000); Columbia, SC
February 16, 2016; 7:00 pm, SECN		at Missouri	L 67–72	21–5 (8–5)	Mizzou Arena (5,017); Columbia, MO
February 20, 2016; 12:00 pm, SECN		Florida	W 73–69 ^{OT}	22–5 (9–5)	Colonial Life Arena (18,000); Columbia, SC
February 24, 2016; 9:00 pm, SECN		Tennessee	W 84–58	23–5 (10–5)	Colonial Life Arena (13,224); Columbia, SC
February 27, 2016; 2:30 pm, SECN		at Mississippi State	L 58–68	23–6 (10–6)	Humphrey Coliseum (7,488); Starkville, MS
March 3, 2016; 7:00 pm, ESPN2		Georgia	L 72–74	23–7 (10–7)	Colonial Life Arena (15,397); Columbia, SC
March 5, 2016; 5:00 pm, SECN		at Arkansas	W 76–61	24–7 (11–7)	Bud Walton Arena (14,548); Fayetteville, AR
SEC Tournament
March 11, 2016; 9:30 pm, SECN	(3)	vs. (6) Georgia; Quarterfinals	L 64–65	24–8	Bridgestone Arena (18,049); Nashville, TN
NIT
March 15, 2016*; 7:00 pm, ESPNU	(1)	(8) High Point; First Round – South Carolina Bracket	W 88–66	25–8	Colonial Life Arena (2,566); Columbia, SC
March 21, 2016*; 9:00 pm, ESPN	(1)	(4) Georgia Tech; Second Round – South Carolina Bracket	L 66–83	25–9	Colonial Life Arena (2,856); Columbia, SC
*Non-conference game. ^{#}Rankings from AP Poll. (#) Tournament seedings in parentheses. All times are in Eastern Time.

== Rankings ==
Ranking movement Legend: ██ Increase in ranking. ██ Decrease in ranking. (RV) Received votes but unranked. (NR) Not ranked.
Poll	Pre	Wk 2	Wk 3	Wk 4	Wk 5	Wk 6	Wk 7	Wk 8	Wk 9	Wk 10	Wk 11	Wk 12	Wk 13	Wk 14	Wk 15	Wk 16	Wk 17	Wk 18	Wk 19	Final
AP	NR	NR	NR	NR	RV	RV	25	24	22	19	24	RV	25	RV	RV	RV	NR	NR	NR	N/A
Coaches	NR	NR	NR	RV	RV	25	23	20	20	15	18	22	23	20	23	RV	RV	RV	NR	NR

== Awards ==
Player	Position	Award	electors
Michael Carrera	Forward	All-SEC 2nd Team	Associated Press
Duane Notice	Guard	SEC Sixth Man of the Year	Associated Press
Sindarius Thornwell	Guard	SEC All-Defense	Associated Press
Source: CBB Reference

== See also ==
2015–16 South Carolina Gamecocks women's basketball team
