= 2015–16 Texas A&M Aggies men's basketball team =

American college basketball season

2015–16 Texas A&M Aggies men's basketball

SEC regular season co-champions

NCAA tournament, Sweet Sixteen
- Conference: Southeastern Conference

Ranking
- Coaches: No. 12
- AP: No. 15
- Record: 28–9 (13–5 SEC)
- Head coach: Billy Kennedy (5th season)
- Assistant coaches: Kyle Keller (5th season); Rick Stansbury (2nd season); Amir Abdur-Rahim (2nd season)
- Home arena: Reed Arena

2015–16 Southeastern Conference men's basketball standings
	Conf.				Overall
Team	W		L	PCT	W		L	PCT
No. 15 Texas A&M	13	–	5	.722	28	–	9	.757
No. 10 Kentucky †	13	–	5	.722	27	–	9	.750
South Carolina	11	–	7	.611	25	–	9	.735
Vanderbilt	11	–	7	.611	19	–	14	.576
LSU	11	–	7	.611	19	–	14	.576
Ole Miss	10	–	8	.556	20	–	12	.625
Georgia	10	–	8	.556	20	–	14	.588
Florida	9	–	9	.500	21	–	15	.583
Arkansas	9	–	9	.500	16	–	16	.500
Alabama	8	–	10	.444	18	–	15	.545
Mississippi State	7	–	11	.389	14	–	17	.452
Tennessee	6	–	12	.333	15	–	19	.441
Auburn	5	–	13	.278	11	–	20	.355
Missouri^{*}	3	–	15	.167	10	–	21	.323
† 2016 SEC tournament winner^{*}Ineligible for postseason play due to self-imposed postseason ban. Rankings from AP poll

The 2015–16 Texas A&M Aggies men's basketball team represented Texas A&M University in the 2015–16 college basketball season. The team's head coach was Billy Kennedy, in his fifth season. The team played their home games at Reed Arena in College Station, Texas and was in its fourth season as a member of the Southeastern Conference. They finished the season 28–9, 13–5 in SEC play to win a share of the SEC regular season championship. They defeated Florida and LSU to advance to the championship game of the SEC tournament, where they lost to Kentucky. They received an at-large bid to the NCAA tournament, where they defeated Green Bay and Northern Iowa to advance to the Sweet Sixteen, where they lost to Oklahoma.

== Previous season ==
The team had a 21–12 (11–7 in conference play) record and entered the SEC Tournament as the 5th seed after losing two games to end conference play, where they lost to Auburn. The team earned an NIT bid as a No. 2 seed (despite making noise for a bid to the NCAA Tournament, which was silenced after a losing skid at the end of the season) and lost in the second round of the NIT To Louisiana Tech after beating Montana in the first round.

== Departures ==
Name	Number	Pos.	Height	Weight	Year	Hometown	Reason for departure
Avery Johnson, Jr.	0	G	5'11"	182	Freshman	Plano, TX	Transferred to Alabama
Derek Cahn	2	F	6'5"	199	Freshman	Highland Park, TX	Walk-on; didn't return
Jordan Green	5	G	6'5"	188	Senior	Flower Mound, TX	Graduated
Kourtney Roberson	14	F	6'9"	247	Senior	Arcadia, LA	Graduated
Davonte Fitzgerald	15	F	6'7"	209	Sophomore	Tucker, GA	Transferred to Minnesota
Ramon White	22	G	6'2"	160	Junior	Fort Worth, TX	Walk-on; didn't return
Peyton Allen	22	G	6'5"	202	Freshman	Chatham, IL	Transferred to Wichita State
Antwan Space	24	F	6'8"	229	RS junior	DeSoto, TX	Graduated & transferred to Massachusetts
Dylan Johns	45	C	6'11"	228	RS sophomore	Ipswich, England	Transferred to Cal State Northridge

=== Incoming transfers ===
Name	Number	Pos.	Height	Weight	Year	Hometown	Previous school
Anthony Collins	11	G	6'1"	175	Senior	Houston, TX	Transferred from South Florida. Wasill be eligible to play immediately since he graduated from South Florida.

== Recruits ==
College recruiting
Name	Hometown	School	Height	Weight	Commit date
Tyler Davis #7 C	Plano, TX	Plano West High School	6 ft 10 in (2.08 m)	270 lb (120 kg)	Aug 22, 2014
Tyler Davis #7 C	Recruit ratings: Scout: Rivals: (88)				
Elijah Thomas #8 C	Lancaster, TX	Lancaster High School	6 ft 9 in (2.06 m)	230 lb (100 kg)	Oct 21, 2014
Elijah Thomas #8 C	Recruit ratings: Scout: Rivals: (88)				
D. J. Hogg #6 SF	Plano, TX	Plano West High School	6 ft 7 in (2.01 m)	205 lb (93 kg)	Sep 7, 2014
D. J. Hogg #6 SF	Recruit ratings: Scout: Rivals: (87)				
Admon Gilder #22 SG	Dallas, TX	James Madison High School	6 ft 3 in (1.91 m)	185 lb (84 kg)	Oct 16, 2014
Admon Gilder #22 SG	Recruit ratings: Scout: Rivals: (85)				
Overall recruit ranking: Scout: Not Ranked Rivals: Not Ranked ESPN: Not Ranked
Note: In many cases, Scout, Rivals, 247Sports, On3, and ESPN may conflict in their listings of height and weight.; In these cases, the average was taken. ESPN grades are on a 100-point scale.; Sources: "Texas A&M 2015 Basketball Commitments". Rivals.; "2015 Texas A&M Basketball Commits". Scout.; "ESPN". ESPN.; "Scout.com Team Recruiting Rankings". Scout.; "2015 Team Ranking". Rivals.

=== Recruits for class of 2016 ===
College recruiting (2016)
Name	Hometown	School	Height	Weight	Commit date
Robert Williams #12 PF	Vivian, LA	North Caddo High School	6 ft 8 in (2.03 m)	220 lb (100 kg)	Jun 20, 2015
Robert Williams #12 PF	Recruit ratings: Scout: Rivals: (86)				
J. J. Caldwell #15 PG	Houston, TX	Cypress Woods High School	5 ft 11 in (1.80 m)	170 lb (77 kg)	May 3, 2015
J. J. Caldwell #15 PG	Recruit ratings: Scout: Rivals: (81)				
Overall recruit ranking: Scout: Not Ranked Rivals: Not Ranked ESPN: Not Ranked
Note: In many cases, Scout, Rivals, 247Sports, On3, and ESPN may conflict in their listings of height and weight.; In these cases, the average was taken. ESPN grades are on a 100-point scale.; Sources: "Texas A&M 2016 Basketball Commitments". Rivals.; "2016 Texas A&M Basketball Commits". Scout.; "ESPN". ESPN.; "Scout.com Team Recruiting Rankings". Scout.; "2016 Team Ranking". Rivals.

== Roster ==
2015–16 Texas A&M Aggies men's basketball team
Players
Coaches

Pos.	#	Name	Height	Weight	Year	Previous school	Hometown
G	0	Kobie Eubanks	6 ft 5 in (1.96 m)	218 lb (99 kg)	Fr	Our Savior New American School	Fort Lauderdale, Florida
F	1	D. J. Hogg	6 ft 8 in (2.03 m)	216 lb (98 kg)	Fr	Plano West	Plano, Texas
G	3	Admon Gilder	6 ft 3 in (1.91 m)	186 lb (84 kg)	Fr	James Madison	Dallas, Texas
C	10	Tonny Trocha-Morelos	6 ft 10 in (2.08 m)	229 lb (104 kg)	RS So	Mayor Jose Celestino Mutis	Cartagena, Colombia
G	11	Anthony Collins	6 ft 1 in (1.85 m)	175 lb (79 kg)	RS Sr	Westbury Christian School/South Florida	Houston, Texas
G/F	12	Jalen Jones	6 ft 7 in (2.01 m)	220 lb (100 kg)	RS Sr	Kimball/SMU	Dallas, Texas
G	13	Juan Aparicio (W)	6 ft 4 in (1.93 m)	196 lb (89 kg)	Sr	Second Baptist (TX)	Bogotá, Colombia
G	20	Chris Collins (W)	6 ft 2 in (1.88 m)	178 lb (81 kg)	So	Friendswood	Friendswood, Texas
G	21	Alex Caruso	6 ft 5 in (1.96 m)	186 lb (84 kg)	Sr	A&M Consolidated	College Station, Texas
G	22	Frank Byers	5 ft 10 in (1.78 m)	170 lb (77 kg)	Fr	South Oak Cliff	Dallas, Texas
G	23	Danuel House	6 ft 7 in (2.01 m)	212 lb (96 kg)	RS Sr	Hightower HS/Houston	Sugar Land, Texas
G	25	Kyle Dobbins (W)	6 ft 0 in (1.83 m)	175 lb (79 kg)	Sr	Memorial	Houston, Texas
G	33	T. J. Distefano	6 ft 2 in (1.88 m)	150 lb (68 kg)	Fr	St. Joseph	College Station, Texas
C	34	Tyler Davis	6 ft 10 in (2.08 m)	265 lb (120 kg)	Fr	Plano West	Plano, Texas
F	42	Tavario Miller	6 ft 7 in (2.01 m)	226 lb (103 kg)	Jr	Wheatley (TX)	Long Island, Bahamas

Head coach

- Billy Kennedy (Southeastern Louisiana)

Assistant coach(es)

- Kyle Keller (Oklahoma State)
- Rick Stansbury (Campbellsville)
- Amir Abdur-Rahim (Murray State)

Legend

- (C) Team captain
- (S) Suspended
- (I) Ineligible
- (W) Walk-on
- Injured
- Current redshirt

Roster

== Schedule ==
Date time, TV	Rank^{#}	Opponent^{#}	Result	Record	Site (attendance) city, state
Exhibition
Nov. 6*; 7:00 pm		Texas A&M International	W 83–45	–	Reed Arena (4,065); College Station, TX
Regular season
Nov. 13*; 8:30 pm		USC Upstate	W 104–54	1–0	Reed Arena (6,552); College Station, TX
Nov. 16*; 7:00 pm		Southeastern Louisiana	W 100–58	2–0	Reed Arena (4,903); College Station, TX
Nov. 19*; 7:00 pm		Texas A&M–Corpus Christi; Battle 4 Atlantis Opening Round	W 95–70	3–0	Reed Arena (5,392); College Station, TX
Nov. 21*; 3:00 pm		UNC Asheville	W 75–47	4–0	Reed Arena (5,557); College Station, TX
Nov. 25*; 6:00 pm, AXS TV	No. 25	vs. Texas; Battle 4 Atlantis Quarterfinals	W 84–73	5–0	Imperial Arena (1,647); Nassau, BS
Nov. 26*; 12:00 pm, ESPN	No. 25	vs. No. 10 Gonzaga; Battle 4 Atlantis Semifinals	W 62–61	6–0	Imperial Arena (1,331); Nassau, BS
Nov. 27*; 2:00 pm, ESPN	No. 25	vs. Syracuse; Battle 4 Atlantis Championship	L 67–74	6–1	Imperial Arena (2,309); Nassau, BS
Dec. 2*; 7:00 pm	No. 18	Florida Gulf Coast	W 75–65	7–1	Reed Arena (5,589); College Station, TX
Dec. 5*; 9:30 pm, ESPN2	No. 18	at Arizona State	L 54–67	7–2	Wells Fargo Arena (7,608); Tempe, AZ
Dec. 12*; 4:30 pm, SECN		Kansas State	W 78–68	8–2	Reed Arena (7,003); College Station, TX
Dec. 19*; 8:00 pm, ESPNU	No. 24	No. 16 Baylor	W 80–61	9–2	Reed Arena (9,056); College Station, TX
Dec. 29*; 7:00 pm	No. 20	Cal Poly	W 82–63	10–2	Reed Arena (7,442); College Station, TX
Jan. 2; 3:30 pm, SECN	No. 20	Arkansas	W 92–69	11–2 (1–0)	Reed Arena (11,332); College Station, TX
Jan. 6; 8:00 pm, SECN	No. 21	at Mississippi State	W 61–60	12–2 (2–0)	Humphrey Coliseum (6,693); Starkville, MS
Jan. 9; 12:00 pm, SECN	No. 21	at Tennessee	W 92–88	13–2 (3–0)	Thompson–Boling Arena (14,907); Knoxville, TN
Jan. 12; 6:00 pm, SECN	No. 15	Florida	W 71–68	14–2 (4–0)	Reed Arena (9,766); College Station, TX
Jan. 16; 1:00 pm, ESPNU	No. 15	at Georgia	W 79–45	15–2 (5–0)	Stegeman Coliseum (10,523); Athens, GA
Jan. 19; 8:00 pm, ESPN	No. 10	LSU	W 71–57	16–2 (6–0)	Reed Arena (13,888); College Station, TX
Jan. 23; 3:00 pm, SECN	No. 10	Missouri	W 66–53	17–2 (7–0)	Reed Arena (12,198); College Station, TX
Jan. 27; 6:00 pm, ESPNU	No. 5	at Arkansas	L 71–74	17–3 (7–1)	Bud Walton Arena (14,410); Fayetteville, AR
Jan. 30*; 1:00 pm, ESPN	No. 5	No. 14 Iowa State; Big 12/SEC Challenge	W 72–62	18–3	Reed Arena (12,473); College Station, TX
Feb. 4; 6:00 pm, ESPN2	No. 8	at Vanderbilt	L 60–77	18–4 (7–2)	Memorial Gymnasium (10,432); Nashville, TN
Feb. 6; 3:00 pm, ESPNU	No. 8	No. 25 South Carolina	L 78–81	18–5 (7–3)	Reed Arena (11,240); College Station, TX
Feb. 10; 6:00 pm, SECN	No. 15	at Alabama	L 62–63	18–6 (7–4)	Coleman Coliseum (11,086); Tuscaloosa, AL
Feb. 13; 12:00 pm, CBS	No. 15	at LSU	L 71–76	18–7 (7–5)	Maravich Center (12,928); Baton Rouge, LA
Feb. 16; 8:00 pm, ESPNU		Ole Miss	W 71–56	19–7 (8–5)	Reed Arena (6,460); College Station, TX
Feb. 20; 5:30 pm, ESPN		No. 14 Kentucky; College GameDay	W 79–77 ^{OT}	20–7 (9–5)	Reed Arena (12,029); College Station, TX
Feb. 24; 6:00 pm, ESPN2	No. 21	Mississippi State	W 68–66	21–7 (10–5)	Reed Arena (8,312); College Station, TX
Feb. 27; 3:00 pm, ESPNU	No. 21	at Missouri	W 84–69	22–7 (11–5)	Mizzou Arena (7,189); Columbia, MO
Mar. 1; 8:00 pm, ESPNU	No. 20	at Auburn	W 81–63	23–7 (12–5)	Auburn Arena (7,238); Auburn, AL
Mar. 5; 11:00 am, ESPN2	No. 20	Vanderbilt	W 76–67	24–7 (13–5)	Reed Arena (12,007); College Station, TX
SEC tournament
Mar. 11; 12:00 pm, SECN	(1) No. 17	vs. (8) Florida; Quarterfinals	W 72–66	25–7	Bridgestone Arena (15,222); Nashville, TN
Mar. 12; 12:00 pm, ESPN	(1) No. 17	vs. (4) LSU; Semifinals	W 71–38	26–7	Bridgestone Arena (19,108); Nashville, TN
Mar. 13; 12:00 pm, ESPN	(1) No. 17	vs. (2) No. 16 Kentucky; Championship	L 77–82 ^{OT}	26–8	Bridgestone Arena (19,613); Nashville, TN
NCAA tournament
Mar. 18*; 6:20 pm, TBS	(3 W) No. 15	vs. (14 W) Green Bay; First Round	W 92–65	27–8	Chesapeake Energy Arena (15,279); Oklahoma City, OK
Mar. 20*; 6:40 pm, truTV	(3 W) No. 15	vs. (11 W) Northern Iowa; Second Round	W 92–88 ^{2OT}	28–8	Chesapeake Energy Arena (15,279); Oklahoma City, OK
Mar. 26*; 6:37 pm, TBS	(3 W) No. 15	vs. (2 W) No. 7 Oklahoma; Sweet Sixteen	L 63–77	28–9	Honda Center (17,601); Anaheim, CA
*Non-conference game. ^{#}Rankings from AP Poll. (#) Tournament seedings in parentheses. W=West Region. All times are in Central Time.

== Rankings ==
Ranking movement Legend: ██ Increase in ranking. ██ Decrease in ranking. (RV) Received votes but unranked. (NR) Not ranked.
Poll	Pre	Wk 2	Wk 3	Wk 4	Wk 5	Wk 6	Wk 7	Wk 8	Wk 9	Wk 10	Wk 11	Wk 12	Wk 13	Wk 14	Wk 15	Wk 16	Wk 17	Wk 18	Wk 19	Final
AP	RV	RV	25т	18	RV	24	21	20	21	15	10	5	8	15	RV	21	20	17	15	N/A
Coaches	RV	RV	RV	20	25	24	19	19	17	14	8	5	8	13	24	21	18	17	15	12
