= 2016 SEC men's basketball tournament =

- Classification: Division I
- Season: 2015–16
- Teams: 13
- Site: Bridgestone Arena; Nashville, Tennessee
- Champions: Kentucky (30th title)
- Winning coach: John Calipari (4th title)
- MVP: Tyler Ulis (Kentucky)
- Attendance: 105,799
- Television: ESPN and SEC Network

2015–16 Southeastern Conference men's basketball standings
	Conf.				Overall
Team	W		L	PCT	W		L	PCT
No. 15 Texas A&M	13	–	5	.722	28	–	9	.757
No. 10 Kentucky †	13	–	5	.722	27	–	9	.750
South Carolina	11	–	7	.611	25	–	9	.735
Vanderbilt	11	–	7	.611	19	–	14	.576
LSU	11	–	7	.611	19	–	14	.576
Ole Miss	10	–	8	.556	20	–	12	.625
Georgia	10	–	8	.556	20	–	14	.588
Florida	9	–	9	.500	21	–	15	.583
Arkansas	9	–	9	.500	16	–	16	.500
Alabama	8	–	10	.444	18	–	15	.545
Mississippi State	7	–	11	.389	14	–	17	.452
Tennessee	6	–	12	.333	15	–	19	.441
Auburn	5	–	13	.278	11	–	20	.355
Missouri^{*}	3	–	15	.167	10	–	21	.323
† 2016 SEC tournament winner^{*}Ineligible for postseason play due to self-imposed postseason ban. Rankings from AP poll

The 2016 Southeastern Conference men's basketball tournament was a postseason men's basketball tournament for the Southeastern Conference held at Bridgestone Arena in Nashville, Tennessee March 9–13, 2016.

This year's tournament involved only 13 of the league's 14 teams. On January 13, 2016, Missouri, then being investigated by the NCAA for rules violations that occurred under the tenure of former head coach Frank Haith, announced that it would not participate in any postseason play this season. As a result, the #11 seed in the tournament was awarded a first-round bye, leaving the #12 seed–#13 seed game as the only game to be played on March 9.

== Seeds ==
Seed	School	Conference record	Overall record	Tiebreaker
1	Texas A&M‡†	13–5	24–7	1–0 vs. Kentucky
2	Kentucky‡†	13–5	23–8	0–1 vs. Texas A&M
3	South Carolina†	11–7	24–7	2–0 vs. LSU/Vanderbilt
4	LSU†	11–7	18–13	1–1 vs. South Carolina/Vanderbilt
5	Vanderbilt#	11–7	19–12	0–2 vs. South Carolina/LSU
6	Georgia#	10–8	17–12	2–0 vs. South Carolina
7	Ole Miss#	10–8	20–11	0–1 vs. South Carolina
8	Florida#	9–9	18–13	1–0 vs. Arkansas
9	Arkansas#	9–9	16–15	0–1 vs. Florida
10	Alabama#	8–10	17–13	
11	Mississippi State#	7–11	14–16	
12	Tennessee	6–12	13–18	
13	Auburn	5–13	11–19	
‡ – SEC regular season co-champions, and tournament No. 1 and No. 2 seeds. † – Received a double-bye in the conference tournament. # – Received a single-bye in the conference tournament. Overall records include all games played in the SEC Tournament.

== Schedule ==
Game	Time*	Matchup^{#}	Final score	Television	Attendance
First round – Wednesday, March 9
1	7:00 pm	#12 Tennessee vs. #13 Auburn	97–59	SEC Network	9,787
Second round – Thursday, March 10
2	12:00 pm	#8 Florida vs. #9 Arkansas	68–61	SEC Network	12,270
3	2:30 pm	#5 Vanderbilt vs. #12 Tennessee	65–67	SEC Network	12,270
4	6:00 pm	#7 Ole Miss vs. #10 Alabama	73–81	SEC Network	11,750
5	8:30 pm	#6 Georgia vs. #11 Mississippi State	79–69	SEC Network	11,750
Quarterfinals – Friday, March 11
6	12:00 pm	#1 Texas A&M vs. #8 Florida	72–66	SEC Network	15,222
7	2:30 pm	#4 LSU vs. #12 Tennessee	84–75	SEC Network	15,222
8	6:00 pm	#2 Kentucky vs. #10 Alabama	85–59	SEC Network	18,049
9	8:30 pm	#3 South Carolina vs. #6 Georgia	64–65	SEC Network	18,049
Semifinals – Saturday, March 12
10	12:00 pm	#1 Texas A&M vs #4 LSU	71–38	ESPN	19,108
11	2:30 pm	#2 Kentucky vs #6 Georgia	93–80	ESPN	19,108
Championship – Sunday, March 13
12	12:00 pm	#1 Texas A&M vs #2 Kentucky	77–82^{OT}	ESPN	19,613
*Game times in CDT. # – Rankings denote tournament seed

== Bracket ==
First round Wednesday, March 9 SEC Network
13	Auburn	59
12	Tennessee	97

Second round Thursday, March 10; SEC Network
9	Arkansas	61
8	Florida	68
12	Tennessee	67
5	Vanderbilt	65
10	Alabama	81
7	Ole Miss	73
11	Mississippi State	69
6	Georgia	79

Quarterfinals; Friday, March 11; SEC Network
8	Florida	66
1	Texas A&M	72
12	Tennessee	75
4	LSU	84
10	Alabama	59
2	Kentucky	85
6	Georgia	65
3	South Carolina	64

Semifinals; Saturday, March 12; ESPN
1	Texas A&M	71
4	LSU	38
2	Kentucky	93
6	Georgia	80

Championship; Sunday, March 13; ESPN
1	Texas A&M	77
2	Kentucky	82*

* – denotes overtime period

== See also ==
- 2016 SEC women's basketball tournament
