= 2015–16 Ole Miss Rebels men's basketball team =

American college basketball season

2015–16 Ole Miss Rebels men's basketball
- Conference: Southeastern Conference
- Record: 20–12 (10–8 SEC)
- Head coach: Andy Kennedy (10th season)
- Assistant coaches: Bill Armstrong; Tony Madlock; Todd Abernethy
- Home arena: Tad Smith Coliseum; The Pavilion at Ole Miss

2015–16 Southeastern Conference men's basketball standings
| | Conf. | | | | Overall |
| Team | W | | L | PCT | W | | L | PCT |
|---|---|---|---|---|---|---|---|---|
| No. 15 Texas A&M | 13 | – | 5 | .722 | 28 | – | 9 | .757 |
| No. 10 Kentucky † | 13 | – | 5 | .722 | 27 | – | 9 | .750 |
| South Carolina | 11 | – | 7 | .611 | 25 | – | 9 | .735 |
| Vanderbilt | 11 | – | 7 | .611 | 19 | – | 14 | .576 |
| LSU | 11 | – | 7 | .611 | 19 | – | 14 | .576 |
| Ole Miss | 10 | – | 8 | .556 | 20 | – | 12 | .625 |
| Georgia | 10 | – | 8 | .556 | 20 | – | 14 | .588 |
| Florida | 9 | – | 9 | .500 | 21 | – | 15 | .583 |
| Arkansas | 9 | – | 9 | .500 | 16 | – | 16 | .500 |
| Alabama | 8 | – | 10 | .444 | 18 | – | 15 | .545 |
| Mississippi State | 7 | – | 11 | .389 | 14 | – | 17 | .452 |
| Tennessee | 6 | – | 12 | .333 | 15 | – | 19 | .441 |
| Auburn | 5 | – | 13 | .278 | 11 | – | 20 | .355 |
| Missouri^{*} | 3 | – | 15 | .167 | 10 | – | 21 | .323 |
† 2016 SEC tournament winner^{*}Ineligible for postseason play due to self-imposed postseason ban. Rankings from AP poll

The 2015–16 Ole Miss Rebels men's basketball team represented the University of Mississippi in the 2015–16 NCAA Division I men's basketball season. Andy Kennedy was in his 10th year as head coach of Ole Miss. The Rebels, members of the Southeastern Conference, began the season playing home games at Tad Smith Coliseum, but moved to a new arena, The Pavilion at Ole Miss, on January 7, 2016. They finished the season 20–12, 10–8 in SEC play to finish in a tie for sixth place. They lost to Alabama in the second round of the SEC tournament. Despite having 20 wins, they did not participate in a postseason tournament.

== Previous season ==
The Rebels finished the 2014–15 season with an overall record of 21–13 and 11–7 in SEC play to finish in a four-way tie for third place in the SEC standings. They lost in the second round of the SEC tournament to South Carolina. Ole Miss participated in the NCAA tournament as an #11 seed, defeating fellow #11 seed BYU in the first round before falling to #6 seeded Xavier in the second round, ending the Rebels' season.

== Departures ==
| Name | Number | Pos. | Height | Weight | Year | Hometown | Notes |
|---|---|---|---|---|---|---|---|
| Roderick Lawrence | 0 | G | 6'5" | 184 | Junior | Orlando, FL | Transferred to Campbellsville |
| Terence Smith | 3 | G | 6'4" | 195 | Senior | Russellville, AL | Graduated |
| M. J. Rhett | 4 | F | 6'9" | 236 | Senior | Columbia, SC | Graduated |
| LaDarius White | 10 | G | 6'6" | 205 | Senior | McComb, MS | Graduated |
| Dwight Coleby | 23 | C | 6'9" | 240 | Sophomore | Nassau, BS | Transferred to Kansas |
| Jarvis Summers | 32 | G | 6'3" | 186 | Senior | Jackson, MS | Graduated |
| Aaron Jones | 34 | F | 6'9" | 230 | Senior | Gautier, MS | Graduated |

=== Incoming transfers ===
| Name | Number | Pos. | Height | Weight | Year | Hometown | Previous School |
|---|---|---|---|---|---|---|---|
| Deandre Burnett | 0 | G | 6'2" | 191 | RS Sophomore | Miami Gardens, FL | Transferred from Miami (FL). Under NCAA transfer rules, Burnett will have to sit out for the 2015–16 season. Will have three years of remaining eligibility. |
| Sam Finley | 10 | G | 6'2" | 180 | Junior | Corona, CA | Junior college transferred from Howard College |
| Tomasz Gielo | 12 | F | 6'9" | 220 | Senior | Szczecin, Poland | Transferred from Liberty. Will be eligible to play immediately since Gielo graduated from Liberty. |
| Rasheed Brooks | 14 | G | 6'6" | 200 | Junior | Mansfield, OH | Junior college transferred from SW Tennessee CC |

== Recruits ==
College recruiting information
| Name | Hometown | School | Height | Weight | Commit date |
|---|---|---|---|---|---|
| Donte Fitzpatrick; SF | Memphis, TN | Southwind High School | 6 ft 5 in (1.96 m) | 175 lb (79 kg) | Sep 9, 2014 |
| Donte Fitzpatrick; SF | Recruit ratings: Scout: Rivals: 247Sports: ESPN: | | | | |
| Terence Davis; SF | Southaven, MS | Southaven High School | 6 ft 4 in (1.93 m) | 190 lb (86 kg) | Jul 29, 2014 |
| Terence Davis; SF | Recruit ratings: Scout: Rivals: 247Sports: ESPN: | | | | |
| J.T. Escobar; SG | Tallahassee, FL | Elev8 Sports Academy | 6 ft 2 in (1.88 m) | 170 lb (77 kg) | Oct 7, 2013 |
| J.T. Escobar; SG | Recruit ratings: Scout: Rivals: 247Sports: ESPN: | | | | |
Overall recruit ranking: Scout: Not Ranked Rivals: Not Ranked ESPN: Not Ranked
Note: In many cases, Scout, Rivals, 247Sports, On3, and ESPN may conflict in their listings of height and weight.; In these cases, the average was taken. ESPN grades are on a 100-point scale.; Sources: "Ole Miss 2015 Basketball Commitments". Rivals.; "2015 Ole Miss Basketball Commits". Scout.; "ESPN". ESPN.; "Scout.com Team Recruiting Rankings". Scout.; "2015 Team Ranking". Rivals.

== Roster ==
2015–16 Ole Miss Rebels men's basketball team
Players
Coaches

| Pos. | # | Name | Height | Weight | Year | Previous school | Hometown |
|---|---|---|---|---|---|---|---|
| G | 0 | Deandre Burnett (I) (redshirt) | 6 ft 2 in (1.88 m) | 194 lb (88 kg) | RS So | Miami (FL) | Miami Gardens, FL |
| G | 1 | Martavious Newby | 6 ft 3 in (1.91 m) | 210 lb (95 kg) | Sr | Booker T. Washington HS | Memphis, TN |
| G | 2 | J. T. Escobar | 6 ft 2 in (1.88 m) | 177 lb (80 kg) | Fr | Elev8 Prep | Tallahassee, FL |
| G | 3 | Terence Davis | 6 ft 4 in (1.93 m) | 190 lb (86 kg) | Fr | Southaven HS | Southaven, MS |
| G | 10 | Sam Finley | 6 ft 2 in (1.88 m) | 179 lb (81 kg) | Jr | Howard College | Corona, CA |
| F | 11 | Sebastian Saiz | 6 ft 9 in (2.06 m) | 233 lb (106 kg) | Jr | Sunrise Christian Academy | Madrid, Spain |
| F | 12 | Tomasz Gielo | 6 ft 9 in (2.06 m) | 220 lb (100 kg) | Sr | Liberty | Szczecin, Poland |
| F | 13 | Anthony Pérez | 6 ft 9 in (2.06 m) | 213 lb (97 kg) | Sr | Word of Life Traditional School | Cumaná, Venezuela |
| G | 14 | Rasheed Brooks | 6 ft 5 in (1.96 m) | 192 lb (87 kg) | Jr | Southwest Tennessee CC | Mansfield, OH |
| G | 15 | Alex Sheppard (W) | 6 ft 3 in (1.91 m) | 192 lb (87 kg) | Fr | Leake Academy | Madden, MS |
| G | 20 | Donte Fitzpatrick-Dorsey | 6 ft 4 in (1.93 m) | 190 lb (86 kg) | Fr | Southwind HS | Memphis, TN |
| F | 21 | Marcanvis Hymon | 6 ft 6 in (1.98 m) | 207 lb (94 kg) | So | Whitehaven HS | Memphis, TN |
| F | 25 | Terry Brutus | 6 ft 6 in (1.98 m) | 237 lb (108 kg) | RS Jr | Massanutten Military Academy | Spring Valley, NY |
| G | 42 | Stefan Moody | 5 ft 10 in (1.78 m) | 179 lb (81 kg) | Sr | Kilgore College | Kissimmee, FL |

Head coach

- Andy Kennedy (UAB)

Assistant coach(es)

- Bill Armstrong (UAB)
- Tony Madlock (Memphis)
- Todd Abernethy (Mississippi)

Legend

- (C) Team captain
- (S) Suspended
- (I) Ineligible
- (W) Walk-on
- Injured
- Current redshirt

Roster

== Schedule and results ==
| Date time, TV | Rank^{#} | Opponent^{#} | Result | Record | Site (attendance) city, state |
Exhibition
| 11/05/2015*; 6:00 pm | | Clayton State | W 103–87 | — | Tad Smith Coliseum; Oxford, MS |
Regular season
| 11/13/2015*; 4:00 pm, ESPN3 | | Northwestern State | W 90–76 | 1–0 | Tad Smith Coliseum (6,386); Oxford, MS |
| 11/16/2015*; 7:00 pm | | Georgia Southern | W 82–72 | 2–0 | Tad Smith Coliseum (5,499); Oxford, MS |
| 11/19/2015*; 11:00 am, ESPN3 | | vs. George Mason; Charleston Classic quarterfinals | L 62–68 | 2–1 | TD Arena (1,760); Charleston, SC |
| 11/20/2015*; 2:30 pm, ESPN3 | | vs. Towson; Charleston Classic consolation round | W 76–60 | 3–1 | TD Arena (1,220); Charleston, SC |
| 11/22/2015*; 2:30 pm, ESPN3 | | vs. Seton Hall; Charleston Classic 5th place game | L 63–75 | 3–2 | TD Arena (1,553); Charleston, SC |
| 11/25/2015*; 4:00 pm, SECN | | Georgia State | W 68–59 | 4–2 | Tad Smith Coliseum (5,550); Oxford, MS |
| 11/28/2015*; 1:00 pm, ESPN3 | | at Bradley; Charleston Classic non-bracket | W 67–54 | 5–2 | Carver Arena (5,603); Peoria, IL |
| 12/05/2015*; 3:00 pm, NBCSN | | vs. Massachusetts; Hall of Fame Holiday Classic | W 74–64 | 6–2 | MassMutual Center (3,765); Springfield, MA |
| 12/12/2015*; 2:00 pm, ASN | | at Southeast Missouri State | W 75–64 | 7–2 | Show Me Center (2,325); Cape Girardeau, MO |
| 12/15/2015*; 6:00 pm, SECN | | Louisiana Tech | W 99–80 | 8–2 | Tad Smith Coliseum (5,606); Oxford, MS |
| 12/19/2015*; 7:00 pm, ESPNews | | at Memphis | W 85–79 | 9–2 | FedEx Forum (14,529); Memphis, TN |
| 12/22/2015*; 3:00 pm, SECN | | Troy | W 83–80 ^{OT} | 10–2 | Tad Smith Coliseum (9,289); Oxford, MS |
| 01/02/2016; 6:00 pm, SECN | | at No. 10 Kentucky | L 61–83 | 10–3 (0–1) | Rupp Arena (24,399); Lexington, KY |
| 01/07/2016; 8:00 pm, ESPNU | | Alabama | W 74–66 | 11–3 (1–1) | The Pavilion at Ole Miss (9,500); Oxford, MS |
| 01/09/2016; 7:30 pm, SECN | | Georgia | W 72–71 | 12–3 (2–1) | The Pavilion at Ole Miss (9,487); Oxford, MS |
| 01/13/2016; 8:00 pm, ESPN2 | | at LSU | L 81–90 | 12–4 (2–2) | Maravich Center (12,133); Baton Rouge, LA |
| 01/16/2016; 7:00 pm, ESPN2 | | Florida | L 71–80 | 12–5 (2–3) | The Pavilion at Ole Miss (9,333); Oxford, MS |
| 01/19/2016; 6:00 pm, SECN | | No. 24 South Carolina | L 74–77 ^{OT} | 12–6 (2–4) | The Pavilion at Ole Miss (7,427); Oxford, MS |
| 01/23/2016; 1:00 pm, SECN | | at Mississippi State | L 77–83 | 12–7 (2–5) | Humphrey Coliseum (8,932); Starkville, MS |
| 01/27/2016; 6:00 pm, SECN | | Auburn | W 80–63 | 13–7 (3–5) | The Pavilion at Ole Miss (8,057); Oxford, MS |
| 01/30/2016*; 1:00 pm, ESPNU | | at Kansas State; Big 12/SEC Challenge | L 64–69 | 13–8 | Bramlage Coliseum (12,528); Manhattan, KS |
| 02/03/2016; 8:00 pm, SECN | | at Missouri | W 76–73 | 14–8 (4–5) | Mizzou Arena (4,734); Columbia, MO |
| 02/06/2016; 7:00 pm, ESPNU | | Vanderbilt | W 85–78 | 15–8 (5–5) | The Pavilion at Ole Miss (9,500); Oxford, MS |
| 02/09/2016; 8:00 pm, ESPNU | | at Florida | L 72–77 | 15–9 (5–6) | O'Connell Center (8,345); Gainesville, FL |
| 02/13/2016; 1:00 pm, ESPNU | | Arkansas | W 76–60 | 16–9 (6–6) | The Pavilion at Ole Miss (9,500); Oxford, MS |
| 02/16/2016; 8:00 pm, ESPNU | | at Texas A&M | L 56–71 | 16–10 (6–7) | Reed Arena (6,460); College Station, TX |
| 02/20/2016; 4:00 pm, SECN | | at Auburn | W 69–59 | 17–10 (7–7) | Auburn Arena (8,041); Auburn, AL |
| 02/23/2016; 8:00 pm, SECN | | Missouri | W 85–76 | 18–10 (8–7) | The Pavilion at Ole Miss (7,274); Oxford, MS |
| 02/27/2016; 11:00 am, SECN | | at Georgia | L 66–80 | 18–11 (8–8) | Stegeman Coliseum (9,874); Athens, GA |
| 03/02/2016; 6:00 pm, SECN | | Mississippi State | W 86–78 | 19–11 (9–8) | The Pavilion at Ole Miss (9,500); Oxford, MS |
| 03/06/2016; 11:00 am, SECN | | at Tennessee | W 83–60 | 20–11 (10–8) | Thompson–Boling Arena (14,424); Knoxville, TN |
SEC tournament
| 03/10/2016; 8:00 pm, SECN | (7) | vs. No. 10 Alabama; Second round | L 73–81 | 20–12 | Bridgestone Arena (11,750); Nashville, TN |
*Non-conference game. ^{#}Rankings from AP Poll. (#) Tournament seedings in parentheses. All times are in Central Time.

== See also ==
- 2015–16 Ole Miss Rebels women's basketball team
- 2015–16 NCAA Division I men's basketball season
