= 2015–16 Auburn Tigers men's basketball team =

American college basketball season

2015–16 Auburn Tigers men's basketball
- Conference: Southeastern Conference
- Record: 11–20 (5–13 SEC)
- Head coach: Bruce Pearl (2nd season)
- Assistant coaches: Todd Golden; Chuck Person; Harris Adler
- Home arena: Auburn Arena

2015–16 Southeastern Conference men's basketball standings
	Conf.				Overall
Team	W		L	PCT	W		L	PCT
No. 15 Texas A&M	13	–	5	.722	28	–	9	.757
No. 10 Kentucky †	13	–	5	.722	27	–	9	.750
South Carolina	11	–	7	.611	25	–	9	.735
Vanderbilt	11	–	7	.611	19	–	14	.576
LSU	11	–	7	.611	19	–	14	.576
Ole Miss	10	–	8	.556	20	–	12	.625
Georgia	10	–	8	.556	20	–	14	.588
Florida	9	–	9	.500	21	–	15	.583
Arkansas	9	–	9	.500	16	–	16	.500
Alabama	8	–	10	.444	18	–	15	.545
Mississippi State	7	–	11	.389	14	–	17	.452
Tennessee	6	–	12	.333	15	–	19	.441
Auburn	5	–	13	.278	11	–	20	.355
Missouri^{*}	3	–	15	.167	10	–	21	.323
† 2016 SEC tournament winner^{*}Ineligible for postseason play due to self-imposed postseason ban. Rankings from AP poll

The 2015–16 Auburn Tigers men's basketball team represented Auburn University during the 2015–16 NCAA Division I men's basketball season. The team's head coach was Bruce Pearl, in his second season at Auburn. The team played their home games at the Auburn Arena in Auburn, Alabama as a member of the Southeastern Conference. They finished the season 11–20, 5–13 in SEC play to finish in 13th place. They lost to Tennessee in the first round of the SEC tournament.

== Previous season ==
The Tigers finished the 2014–15 season 15–20 record, 4–14 in SEC play to finish in 13th place. They advanced to the semifinals of the SEC tournament where they lost to Kentucky.

== Departures ==
Name	Number	Pos.	Height	Weight	Year	Hometown	Notes
Malcolm Canada	00	G	6'3"	225	Senior	Austin, TX	Graduated
K. T. Harrell	1	G	6'4"	212	Senior	Montgomery, AL	Graduated
K. C. Ross-Miller	12	G	6'0"	178	RS Senior	Grand Prairie, TX	Graduated
Antoine Mason	14	G	6'1"	216	Senior	Queens, NY	Graduated
Alex Thompson	20	F	6'9"	210	Sophomore	Dothan, AL	Transferred to Samford
Jack Purchase	24	F	6'8"	198	Freshman	Melbourne, Australia	Transferred to Hawaii
Matthew Atewe	41	C	6'8"	250	Sophomore	Brampton, ON	Transferred to Washington

=== Incoming transfers ===
Name	Number	Pos.	Height	Weight	Year	Hometown	Previous School
T. J. Dunans	4	G	6'5"	190	Junior	Atlanta, GA	Junior college transferred from Columbia State Community College
Tyler Harris	12	F	6'9"	223	RS Senior	Dix Hills, NY	Transferred from Providence. Haris will be eligible to play immediately since Harris graduated from Providence.

== Recruits ==
College recruiting information
Name	Hometown	School	Height	Weight	Commit date
Horace Spencer; PF	Henderson, NV	Findlay Prep	6 ft 8 in (2.03 m)	215 lb (98 kg)	Aug 24, 2015
Horace Spencer; PF	Recruit ratings: Scout: Rivals: 247Sports: ESPN:				
Danjel Purifoy; SF	Centreville, AL	Hargrave Military	6 ft 6 in (1.98 m)	190 lb (86 kg)	Aug 22, 2014
Danjel Purifoy; SF	Recruit ratings: Scout: Rivals: 247Sports: ESPN:				
New Williams; PG/SG	Santa Monica, CA	Santa Monica	6 ft 2 in (1.88 m)	176 lb (80 kg)	Aug 31, 2015
New Williams; PG/SG	Recruit ratings: Scout: Rivals: 247Sports: ESPN:				
Bryce Brown; SG	Decatur, GA	Columbia	6 ft 2 in (1.88 m)	173 lb (78 kg)	Nov 14, 2014
Bryce Brown; SG	Recruit ratings: Scout: Rivals: 247Sports: ESPN:				
Overall recruit ranking: Scout: 21 Rivals: 11 ESPN: 28
Note: In many cases, Scout, Rivals, 247Sports, On3, and ESPN may conflict in their listings of height and weight.; In these cases, the average was taken. ESPN grades are on a 100-point scale.; Sources: "Auburn 2015 Basketball Commitments". Rivals.; "2015 Auburn Basketball Commits". Scout.; "ESPN". ESPN.; "Scout.com Team Recruiting Rankings". Scout.; "2015 Team Ranking". Rivals.

== Roster ==
2015–16 Auburn Tigers men's basketball team
Players
Coaches

Pos.	#	Name	Height	Weight	Year	Previous school	Hometown
F	0	Horace Spencer	6 ft 9 in (2.06 m)	220 lb (100 kg)	Fr	Findlay Prep	Warminster, PA
G	1	Kareem Canty (S)	6 ft 1 in (1.85 m)	185 lb (84 kg)	Jr	Marshall	Harlem, NY
G	2	Bryce Brown	6 ft 3 in (1.91 m)	195 lb (88 kg)	Fr	Tucker	Stone Mountain, GA
G	4	T. J. Dunans	6 ft 5 in (1.96 m)	174 lb (79 kg)	Jr	Columbia State CC	Atlanta, GA
F	5	Cinmeon Bowers	6 ft 7 in (2.01 m)	250 lb (113 kg)	Sr	Chipola College	Racine, WI
F	12	Tyler Harris	6 ft 10 in (2.08 m)	228 lb (103 kg)	GS	Providence	Dix Hills, NY
G	13	Tahj Shamsid-Deen	5 ft 9 in (1.75 m)	175 lb (79 kg)	Jr	Columbia	Decatur, GA
G	20	Jonathan Walker (W)	6 ft 3 in (1.91 m)	197 lb (89 kg)	Sr	Sparkman	Madison, AL
G	21	Patrick Keim (W)	6 ft 0 in (1.83 m)	186 lb (84 kg)	So	Mountain Brook	Birmingham, AL
G	22	Zach Allison (W)	6 ft 2 in (1.88 m)	166 lb (75 kg)	Fr	Pelham	Pelham, AL
G	23	T. J. Lang	6 ft 7 in (2.01 m)	200 lb (91 kg)	So	McGill Toolen	Mobile, AL
F	25	Jordon Granger	6 ft 8 in (2.03 m)	220 lb (100 kg)	Sr	McCluer North	St. Louis, MO
F	31	Devin Waddell	6 ft 5 in (1.96 m)	225 lb (102 kg)	Jr	Hargrave Military Academy	Summerfield, NC
C	41	Cole Blackstock (W)	6 ft 9 in (2.06 m)	253 lb (115 kg)	Fr	Brooks	Killen, AL
G	42	Cole Stockton (W)	6 ft 4 in (1.93 m)	195 lb (88 kg)	Sr	Shelton State CC	Auburn, AL
G	44	New Williams	6 ft 2 in (1.88 m)	170 lb (77 kg)	Fr	Santa Monica	Santa Monica, CA
C	50	Trayvon Reed	7 ft 2 in (2.18 m)	245 lb (111 kg)	So	Life Center Academy	Mobile, AL

Head coach

- Bruce Pearl (Boston College)

Assistant coach(es)

- Todd Golden (Saint Mary's)
- Chuck Person (Auburn)
- Harris Adler (Rowan)

Legend

- (C) Team captain
- (S) Suspended
- (I) Ineligible
- (W) Walk-on
- Injured
- Current redshirt

Roster

== Schedule and results ==
Date time, TV	Rank^{#}	Opponent^{#}	Result	Record	Site (attendance) city, state
Exhibition
October 30, 2015*; 7:00 pm		Brevard College	W 99−59	0−0	Auburn Arena (6,999); Auburn, AL
November 5, 2015*; 6:00 pm		Indianapolis	W 114−109 ^{OT}	0−0	Auburn Arena (5,327); Auburn, AL
Regular season
November 13, 2015*; 8:30 pm, SECN+		UAB; Rivalry	W 75−74	1−0	Auburn Arena (9,121); Auburn, AL
November 17, 2015*; 2:00 pm, ESPN		Colorado; ESPN Tip-Off Marathon	L 84−91	1−1	Auburn Arena (8,075); Auburn, AL
November 20, 2015*; 8:30 pm, SECN+		Georgia Southern	W 92–62	2–1	Auburn Arena (7,806); Auburn, AL
November 27, 2015*; 7:30 pm, SECN		Northwestern State	W 119−81	3−1	Auburn Arena (8,529); Auburn, AL
December 2, 2015*; 6:00 pm, BSN		at Coastal Carolina	W 81−78	4−1	HTC Center (3,286); Conway, SC
December 12, 2015*; 12:00 pm, MTSU		vs. Middle Tennessee	L 81−88 ^{OT}	4−2	Bridgestone Arena (7,322); Nashville, TN
December 15, 2015*; 8:00 pm, SECN		Mercer	W 78−71	5−2	Auburn Arena (8,033); Auburn, AL
December 19, 2015*; 11:00 am, FS1		at No. 10 Xavier	L 61−85	5−3	Cintas Center (10,018); Cincinnati, OH
December 22, 2015*; 1:30 pm, ESPNU		vs. New Mexico; Diamond Head Classic Quarterfinals	W 83−78	6−3	Stan Sheriff Center (7,161); Honolulu, HI
December 23, 2015*; 3:30 pm, ESPNU		vs. Harvard; Diamond Head Classic Semifinals	L 51−69	6−4	Stan Sheriff Center (6,437); Honolulu, HI
December 25, 2015*; 5:30 pm, ESPN2		vs. Hawaii; Diamond Head Classic Consolation	L 67−79	6−5	Stan Sheriff Center (7,251); Honolulu, HI
January 2, 2016; 1:00 pm, CBS		Tennessee	W 83−77	7−5 (1−0)	Auburn Arena (8,614); Auburn, AL
January 5, 2016; 6:00 pm, SECN		No. 22 South Carolina	L 69−81	7−6 (1−1)	Auburn Arena (7,556); Auburn, AL
January 9, 2016; 8:00 pm, ESPN2		at Missouri	L 61–76	7–7 (1–2)	Mizzou Arena (6,533); Columbia, MO
January 12, 2016; 8:00 pm, ESPNU		at Vanderbilt	L 57–75	7–8 (1–3)	Memorial Gymnasium (10,414); Nashville, TN
January 16, 2016; 3:00 pm, ESPN		No. 14 Kentucky	W 75−70	8−8 (2−3)	Auburn Arena (9,121); Auburn, AL
January 19, 2016; 8:00 pm, SECN		Alabama; Rivalry	W 83−77	9−8 (3−3)	Auburn Arena (9,121); Auburn, AL
January 23, 2016; 7:00 pm, SECN		at Florida	L 63−95	9−9 (3−4)	O'Connell Center (11,230); Gainesville, FL
January 27, 2016; 6:00 pm, SECN		at Ole Miss	L 63–80	9–10 (3–5)	The Pavilion at Ole Miss (8,057); Oxford, MS
January 30, 2016*; 7:00 pm, ESPN2		Oklahoma State; Big 12/SEC Challenge	L 63–74	9–11	Auburn Arena (8,867); Auburn, AL
February 2, 2016; 6:00 pm, SECN		LSU	L 68–80	9–12 (3–6)	Auburn Arena (8,051); Auburn, AL
February 6, 2016; 4:30 pm, SECN		at Georgia	L 55–65	9–13 (3–7)	Stegeman Coliseum (10,523); Athens, GA
February 9, 2016; 6:00 pm, SECN		at Tennessee	L 45–71	9–14 (3–8)	Thompson-Boling Arena (13,740); Knoxville, TN
February 13, 2016; 5:00 pm, ESPN2		Vanderbilt	L 57–86	9–15 (3–9)	Auburn Arena (7,954); Auburn, AL
February 17, 2016; 6:00 pm, SECN		at Arkansas	W 90–86	10–15 (4–9)	Bud Walton Arena (14,351); Fayetteville, AR
February 20, 2016; 4:00 pm, SECN		Ole Miss	L 59–69	10–16 (4–10)	Auburn Arena (8,046); Auburn, AL
February 24, 2015; 6:00 pm, SECN		Georgia	W 84–81	11–16 (5–10)	Auburn Arena (7,112); Auburn, AL
February 27, 2016; 4:00 pm, SECN		at Alabama; Rivalry	L 57–65	11–17 (5–11)	Coleman Coliseum (15,383); Tuscaloosa, AL
March 1, 2016; 8:00 pm, ESPNU		No. 20 Texas A&M	L 63–81	11–18 (5–12)	Auburn Arena (7,238); Auburn, AL
March 5, 2016; 1:30 pm, SECN		at Mississippi State	L 66–79	11–19 (5–13)	Humphrey Coliseum (7,722); Starkville, MS
SEC tournament
March 9, 2016; 8:00 pm, SECN	(13)	vs. (12) Tennessee; First round	L 59–97	11–20	Bridgestone Arena (9,787); Nashville, TN
*Non-conference game. ^{#}Rankings from AP Poll. (#) Tournament seedings in parentheses. All times are in Central Time. Source.
