= 2015–16 Florida Gators men's basketball team =

American college basketball season

2015–16 Florida Gators men's basketball

NIT, Quarterfinals
- Conference: Southeastern Conference
- Record: 21–15 (9–9 SEC)
- Head coach: Mike White (1st season)
- Assistant coaches: Dusty May; Jordan Mincy; Darris Nichols
- Home arena: O'Connell Center

2015–16 Southeastern Conference men's basketball standings
	Conf.				Overall
Team	W		L	PCT	W		L	PCT
No. 15 Texas A&M	13	–	5	.722	28	–	9	.757
No. 10 Kentucky †	13	–	5	.722	27	–	9	.750
South Carolina	11	–	7	.611	25	–	9	.735
Vanderbilt	11	–	7	.611	19	–	14	.576
LSU	11	–	7	.611	19	–	14	.576
Ole Miss	10	–	8	.556	20	–	12	.625
Georgia	10	–	8	.556	20	–	14	.588
Florida	9	–	9	.500	21	–	15	.583
Arkansas	9	–	9	.500	16	–	16	.500
Alabama	8	–	10	.444	18	–	15	.545
Mississippi State	7	–	11	.389	14	–	17	.452
Tennessee	6	–	12	.333	15	–	19	.441
Auburn	5	–	13	.278	11	–	20	.355
Missouri^{*}	3	–	15	.167	10	–	21	.323
† 2016 SEC tournament winner^{*}Ineligible for postseason play due to self-imposed postseason ban. Rankings from AP poll

The 2015–16 Florida Gators men's basketball team represented the University of Florida in the sport of basketball during the 2015–16 NCAA Division I men's basketball season. This was the Gators' first season since 1995-96 without long-time head coach Billy Donovan, as he left the Gators to become the new head coach of the NBA's Oklahoma City Thunder. The Gators, led by first year head coach Mike White, competed in the Southeastern Conference (SEC) and played their home games in the O'Connell Center on the university's Gainesville, Florida campus. They finished the season 21–15, 9–9 in SEC play to finish in a tie for eighth place. They lost to Texas A&M in the quarterfinals of the SEC tournament. They received an invitation to the National Invitation Tournament, where they defeated North Florida, 97–68, and Ohio State, 74–66, to advance to the quarterfinals where they lost to George Washington, 82–77.

== Previous season ==
The Gators finished the 2014–15 season 16–17, 8–10 in SEC play to finish in a tie for eighth place. They advanced to the quarterfinals of the SEC tournament where they lost to Kentucky. They did not participate in a postseason tournament for the first time in 17 years.

== Departures ==
Name	Number	Pos.	Height	Weight	Year	Hometown	Notes
Eli Carter	1	G	6'2"	200	RS Junior	Paterson, NJ	Graduate transferred to Boston College
Michael Frazier II	20	G	6'4"	194	Junior	Tampa, FL	Declared for 2015 NBA draft
Jon Horford	21	F	6'10"	240	RS Senior	Grand Ledge, MI	Graduated
Chris Walker	23	F	6'10"	220	Sophomore	Bonifay, FL	Declared for 2015 NBA draft
Billy Donovan, Jr.	42	G	6'2"	192	Senior	Gainesville, FL	Walk on; graduated

== Recruiting class of 2015 ==
College recruiting information
Name	Hometown	School	Height	Weight	Commit date
KeVaughn Allen; SG	North Little Rock High School	North Little Rock, AR	6 ft 3 in (1.91 m)	170 lb (77 kg)	Apr 30, 2014
KeVaughn Allen; SG	Recruit ratings: Scout: Rivals: 247Sports: (4)				
Kevarrius Hayes; PF	Suwannee High School	Live Oak, FL	6 ft 9 in (2.06 m)	190 lb (86 kg)	Jun 17, 2013
Kevarrius Hayes; PF	Recruit ratings: Scout: Rivals: 247Sports: (4)				
Keith Stone; PF	Zion Lutheran Christian School	Deerfield Beach, FL	6 ft 7 in (2.01 m)	240 lb (110 kg)	Oct 20, 2014
Keith Stone; PF	Recruit ratings: Scout: Rivals: 247Sports: (4)				
Overall recruit ranking: Scout: 11 Rivals: 11 ESPN: 13
Note: In many cases, Scout, Rivals, 247Sports, On3, and ESPN may conflict in their listings of height and weight.; In these cases, the average was taken. ESPN grades are on a 100-point scale.; Sources: "2015 Florida Basketball Commits". Scout.; "ESPN". ESPN.; "Scout.com Team Recruiting Rankings". Scout.; "2015 Team Ranking". Rivals.

=== Recruiting class of 2016 ===
College recruiting information (2016)
Name	Hometown	School	Height	Weight	Commit date
John Mooney; PF	Lake Brantley High School	Altamonte Springs, FL	6 ft 9 in (2.06 m)	210 lb (95 kg)	Sep 28, 2013
John Mooney; PF	Recruit ratings: Scout: Rivals: 247Sports: (80)				
Overall recruit ranking:
Note: In many cases, Scout, Rivals, 247Sports, On3, and ESPN may conflict in their listings of height and weight.; In these cases, the average was taken. ESPN grades are on a 100-point scale.; Sources: "2016 Florida Basketball Commits". Scout.; "Scout.com Team Recruiting Rankings". Scout.; "2016 Team Ranking". Rivals.

== Roster ==
2015–16 Florida Gators men's basketball team
Players
Coaches

Pos.	#	Name	Height	Weight	Year	Hometown
G	0	Kasey Hill	6 ft 1 in (1.85 m)	180 lb (82 kg)	Jr	Umatilla, Florida
G/F	1	DeVon Walker	6 ft 6 in (1.98 m)	203 lb (92 kg)	RS Jr	Winter Haven, Florida
G	2	Brandone Francis	6 ft 5 in (1.96 m)	205 lb (93 kg)	RS Fr	La Romana, Dominican Republic
F	3	Devin Robinson	6 ft 8 in (2.03 m)	195 lb (88 kg)	So	Chesterfield, Virginia
G	4	KeVaughn Allen	6 ft 2 in (1.88 m)	183 lb (83 kg)	Fr	Little Rock, Arkansas
F	5	Alex Murphy	6 ft 8 in (2.03 m)	225 lb (102 kg)	RS Sr	Wakefield, Rhode Island
F	10	Dorian Finney-Smith	6 ft 8 in (2.03 m)	220 lb (100 kg)	RS Sr	Portsmouth, Virginia
G	11	Chris Chiozza	6 ft 0 in (1.83 m)	175 lb (79 kg)	So	Memphis, Tennessee
G	12	Zach Hodskins (W)	6 ft 4 in (1.93 m)	203 lb (92 kg)	So	Alpharetta, Georgia
F	13	Kevarrius Hayes	6 ft 9 in (2.06 m)	210 lb (95 kg)	Fr	Live Oak, Florida
G	14	Lexx Edwards (W)	6 ft 2 in (1.88 m)	220 lb (100 kg)	RS Sr	Orlando, Florida
C	15	John Egbunu	6 ft 11 in (2.11 m)	255 lb (116 kg)	RS So	Bauchi, Nigeria
G	20	Jhonny Victor (W)	6 ft 4 in (1.93 m)	178 lb (81 kg)	RS Fr	Orlando, Florida
F	23	Keith Stone	6 ft 8 in (2.03 m)	233 lb (106 kg)	Fr	Deerfield Beach, Florida
F	24	Justin Leon	6 ft 8 in (2.03 m)	196 lb (89 kg)	Jr	Conway, Arkansas
F/C	32	Schuyler Rimmer	6 ft 10 in (2.08 m)	245 lb (111 kg)	Jr	Orlando, Florida

Head coach

- Mike White (1st year)

Assistant coach(es)

- Dusty May (1st year)
- Jordan Mincy (1st year)
- Darris Nichols (1st year)

Legend

- (C) Team captain
- (S) Suspended
- (I) Ineligible
- (W) Walk-on
- Injured
- Current redshirt

Roster
Last update: November 17, 2015

== Schedule ==
Date time, TV	Rank^{#}	Opponent^{#}	Result	Record	High points	High rebounds	High assists	Site (attendance) city, state
Exhibition
November 5*; 7:00 pm		Palm Beach Atlantic	W 89–42	–	12 – Tied	10 – Robinson	7 – Chiozza	O'Connell Center (8,123); Gainesville, FL
Regular season
November 13*; 9:30 pm, CBSSN		at Navy; Veterans Classic	W 59–41	1–0	13 – Robinson	12 – Finney-Smith	5 – Hill	Alumni Hall (5,710); Annapolis, MD
November 16*; 8:00 pm		North Carolina A&T; Hall of Fame Tip Off	W 104–54	2–0	15 – Tied	10 – Finney-Smith	8 – Hill	O'Connell Center (8,605); Gainesville, FL
November 21*; 2:30 pm, ESPN3		vs. Saint Joseph's; Hall of Fame Tip Off	W 74–63	3–0	13 – Tied	10 – Robinson	4 – Chiozza	Mohegan Sun Arena (4,507); Uncasville, CT
November 22*; 5:30 pm, ESPN2		vs. No. 21 Purdue; Hall of Fame Tip Off	L 70–85	3–1	19 – Egbunu	8 – Finney-Smith	4 – Finney-Smith	Mohegan Sun Arena (3,813); Uncasville, CT
November 25*; 3:00 pm, SECN		Vermont; Hall of Fame Tip Off	W 86–62	4–1	20 – Finney-Smith	8 – Robinson	6 – Finney-Smith	O'Connell Center (8,003); Gainesville, FL
November 27*; 6:30 pm, SECN		Florida Gulf Coast	W 70–50	5–1	23 – Finney-Smith	11 – Egbunu	3 – Tied	O'Connell Center (10,323); Gainesville, FL
December 1*; 7:00 pm, SECN		Richmond	W 76–56	6–1	17 – Egbunu	14 – Egbunu	7 – Finney-Smith	O'Connell Center (8,231); Gainesville, FL
December 8*; 7:00 pm, ESPN2		at No. 17 Miami (FL)	L 55–66	6–2	14 – Egbunu	6 – Tied	3 – Chiozza	BankUnited Center (7,972); Coral Gables, FL
December 12*; 6:00 pm, ESPN2		at No. 1 Michigan State	L 52–58	6–3	13 – Tied	9 – Robinson	3 – Tied	Breslin Center (14,797); East Lansing, MI
December 19*; 8:00 pm, FS1		vs. Oklahoma State; Orange Bowl Basketball Classic	W 72–70	7–3	16 – Finney-Smith	9 – Finney-Smith	8 – Hill	BB&T Center (9,483); Sunrise, FL
December 22*; 7:00 pm		Jacksonville	W 89–65	8–3	15 – Allen	7 – Hayes	7 – Chiozza	O'Connell Center (9,083); Gainesville, FL
December 29*; 7:00 pm, ESPN2		Florida State; Rivalry	L 71–73	8–4	32 – Allen	7 – Tied	5 – Chiozza	O'Connell Center (10,121); Gainesville, FL
January 2; 8:00 pm, ESPNU		Georgia	W 77–63	9–4 (1–0)	18 – Allen	12 – Egbunu	6 – Chiozza	O'Connell Center (9,053); Gainesville, FL
January 6; 7:00 pm, ESPN2		at Tennessee	L 69–83	9–5 (1–1)	18 – Allen	11 – Finney-Smith	5 – Hill	Thompson–Boling Arena (14,387); Knoxville, TN
January 9; 1:30 pm, CBS		LSU	W 68–62	10–5 (2–1)	14 – Tied	9 – Leon	8 – Chiozza	O'Connell Center (11,350); Gainesville, FL
January 12; 7:00 pm, SECN		at No. 15 Texas A&M	L 68–71	10–6 (2–2)	17 – Finney-Smith	12 – Finney-Smith	8 – Chiozza	Reed Arena (9,766); College Station, TX
January 16; 8:00 pm, ESPN2		at Ole Miss	W 80–71	11–6 (3–2)	27 – Allen	10 – Finney-Smith	9 – Chiozza	The Pavilion at Ole Miss (9,333); Oxford, MS
January 19; 7:00 pm, ESPNU		Mississippi State	W 81–78	12–6 (4–2)	20 – Finney-Smith	13 – Finney-Smith	5 – Chiozza	O'Connell Center (8,250); Gainesville, FL
January 23; 8:00 pm, SECN		Auburn	W 95–63	13–6 (5–2)	24 – Finney-Smith	9 – Egbunu	8 – Chiozza	O'Connell Center (11,230); Gainesville, FL
January 26; 9:00 pm, ESPNU		at Vanderbilt	L 59–60	13–7 (5–3)	16 – Allen	14 – Finney-Smith	3 – Chiozza	Memorial Gymnasium (11,351); Nashville, TN
January 30*; 12:00 pm, ESPN		No. 9 West Virginia; Big 12/SEC Challenge	W 88–71	14–7	24 – Finney-Smith	6 – Rimmer	6 – Chiozza	O'Connell Center (11,611); Gainesville, FL
February 3; 7:00 pm, SECN		Arkansas	W 87–83	15–7 (6–3)	22 – Finney-Smith	9 – Finney-Smith	8 – Chiozza	O'Connell Center (9,013); Gainesville, FL
February 6; 4:00 pm, CBS		at No. 20 Kentucky; Rivalry	L 61–80	15–8 (6–4)	24 – Finney-Smith	8 – Finney-Smith	4 – Chiozza	Rupp Arena (24,406); Lexington, KY
February 9; 9:00 pm, ESPNU		Ole Miss	W 77–72	16–8 (7–4)	16 – Finney-Smith	10 – Egbunu	6 – Hill	O'Connell Center (8,345); Gainesville, FL
February 13; 5:30 pm, SECN		Alabama	L 55–61	16–9 (7–5)	12 – Tied	12 – Robinson	2 – Tied	O'Connell Center (12,045); Gainesville, FL
February 16; 9:00 pm, ESPN		at Georgia	W 57–53	17–9 (8–5)	19 – Allen	8 – Leon	5 – Hill	Stegeman Coliseum (8,021); Athens, GA
February 20; 12:00 pm, SECN		at South Carolina	L 69–73 ^{OT}	17–10 (8–6)	18 – Finney-Smith	13 – Finney-Smith	7 – Hill	Colonial Life Arena (18,000); Columbia, SC
February 23; 7:00 pm, SECN		Vanderbilt	L 74–87	17–11 (8–7)	15 – Leon	11 – Finney-Smith	5 – Hill	O'Connell Center (9,035); Gainesville, FL
February 27; 8:30 pm, ESPN		at LSU	L 91–96	17–12 (8–8)	22 – Egbunu	7 – Finney-Smith	7 – Chiozza	Maravich Center (13,468); Baton Rouge, LA
March 1; 7:00 pm, ESPN		No. 22 Kentucky; Rivalry	L 79–88	17–13 (8–9)	27 – Egbunu	5 – Tied	5 – Finney-Smith	O'Connell Center (10,684); Gainesville, FL
March 5; 7:30 pm, SECN		at Missouri	W 82–72	18–13 (9–9)	20 – Finney-Smith	7 – Tied	8 – Chiozza	Mizzou Arena (7,013); Columbia, MO
SEC Tournament
March 10; 1:00 pm, SECN	(8)	vs. (9) Arkansas; Second Round	W 68–61	19–13	18 – Hill	9 – Tied	5 – Hill	Bridgestone Arena (12,270); Nashville, TN
March 11; 1:00 pm, SECN	(8)	vs. (1) No. 17 Texas A&M; Quarterfinals	L 66–72	19–14	18 – Hill	9 – Finney-Smith	2 – Hill	Bridgestone Arena (15,222); Nashville, TN
National Invitation Tournament
March 15*; 9:00 pm, ESPNU	(2)	at (7) North Florida; First Round – Monmouth Bracket	W 97–68	20–14	15 – Finney-Smith	10 – Egbunu	7 – Chiozza	UNF Arena (6,011); Jacksonville, FL
March 20*; Noon, ESPN	(2)	at (3) Ohio State; Second Round – Monmouth Bracket	W 74–66	21–14	16 – Finney-Smith	12 – Finney-Smith	5 – Hill	Value City Arena (8,185); Columbus, OH
March 23*; 7:00 pm, ESPN2	(2)	at (4) George Washington; Quarterfinals – Monmouth Bracket	L 77–82	21–15	22 – Allen	8 – Finney-Smith	7 – Hill	Charles E. Smith Center (3,399); Washington, D.C.
*Non-conference game. ^{#}Rankings from AP Poll. (#) Tournament seedings in parentheses. All times are in Eastern Time.

== See also ==
- 2015–16 Florida Gators women's basketball team
