= Duane Notice =

Canadian basketball player (born 1994)

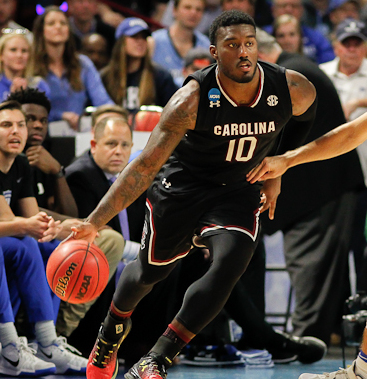
- Notice with the South Carolina Gamecocks in 2017

No. 10 – Vancouver Bandits
- Position: Shooting guard
- League: CEBL

Personal information
- Born: September 7, 1994 (age 32) Toronto, Ontario, Canada
- Listed height: 6 ft 2 in (1.88 m)
- Listed weight: 218 lb (99 kg)

Career information
- High school: St. Michael's College School (Toronto, Ontario); St. Thomas More School (Oakdale, Connecticut)
- College: South Carolina (2013–2017)
- NBA draft: 2017: undrafted
- Playing career: 2017–present

Career history
- 2017–2018: Stal Ostrów Wielkopolski
- 2018–2020: Raptors 905
- 2019–2022: Hamilton Honey Badgers
- 2022–present: Sudbury Five
- 2023–present: Vancouver Bandits

Career highlights
- SEC Sixth Man of the Year (2016); Jordan Brand Classic International MVP (2010)
Medals
Men's basketball
Representing Canada
FIBA Americas Under-16 Championship
Bronze medal – third place	2009 Argentina
FIBA Under-17 Basketball World Cup
Bronze medal – third place	2010 Germany
FIBA Americas Under-18 Championship
Bronze medal – third place	2012 Brazil

Duane Notice (born September 7, 1994) is a Canadian basketball player for the Vancouver Bandits of the CEBL. He played college basketball for the University of South Carolina where he is the all-time leader in games played. He won the SEC Sixth Man of the Year award in 2016 and played in the 2017 Final Four. He also plays for the Canadian national team.

== High school career ==
In high school, Notice played for St. Michael's College School in Toronto, Ontario for four years, playing a starting role on the senior team since grade nine. He then moved to St. Thomas More in Connecticut for a postgraduate year in 2012. In August 2009, he led the Ontario provincial U15 squad to a national championship, where he also won MVP honours. In 2010, he was named MVP of the 2010 Jordan Brand Classic International Game, becoming the first Canadian to win the award.

== College career ==
Notice committed to the University of South Carolina in the SEC where he played for four years. After being a starter for his first two years, he was asked to become the team's sixth man for his junior year, following the recruitment of PJ Dozier to the team. That same season, he won the SEC Sixth Man of the Year award, averaging 10.8 points and 2.4 rebounds per game. In his senior season, he returned to a starting role and helped South Carolina advance to the Final Four in 2017 NCAA Division I men's basketball tournament as champions of the East region, where he was heralded for his defense, where they lost to Gonzaga by a score of 77–73. Notice averaged 10.2 points, 2.5 rebounds, 2.4 assists and 1.0 steals per game. He finished his four-year career at South Carolina as the school's all-time leader in games played with 138 and second in 3 point field goals made with 219.

== Professional career ==
After going undrafted in the 2017 NBA draft, Notice joined Stal Ostrów Wielkopolski of the Polish Basketball League and appeared for them in the 2017–18 FIBA Europe Cup.

In 2018, he joined the Raptors 905 of the NBA G League following an open tryout and shot just under 40% from 3-point range that season. He played in the 2019 NBA Summer League for the Toronto Raptors and afterwards, he joined the Hamilton Honey Badgers of the Canadian Elite Basketball League for their inaugural season. Due to his participation in the NBA Summer League, he missed the first 15 games of the 20-game season. He re-joined the Raptors 905 for the 2019-2020 season, where he was the only player from the 2018–19 season to return for the season. On March 24, 2020, after the cancellation of the 2019–20 NBA G League season due to the COVID-19 pandemic, Notice re-signed with the Hamilton Honey Badgers for their 2020 season. On July 29, in the third game of the CEBL Summer Series, Notice tore his left Achilles tendon, ending his season and sidelining him indefinitely. He re-signed with the Honey Badgers on February 12, 2021. Although he did not play in 2021 due to the prior injury, he re-signed with the Honey Badgers for the 2022 season.

Notice signed with the Sudbury Five of the National Basketball League of Canada for the 2023 season.

On April 12, 2023, Notice signed with the Vancouver Bandits of the Canadian Elite Basketball League. He was named the team's defensive player of the year.

On October 23, 2023, Notice re-signed with the Sudbury Five.

On February 22, 2024, Notice returned to the Vancouver Bandits of the Canadian Elite Basketball League.

On October 2, 2024, Notice returned to the Sudbury Five.

On March 28, 2025, Notice re-signed with the Vancouver Bandits.

== International career ==
Notice has played for the Canada men's national basketball team at the youth and senior levels. He has won three bronze medals for Canada at the 2009 FIBA Americas Under-16 Championship, the 2010 FIBA Under-17 World Championship, and the 2012 FIBA Americas Under-18 Championship. He also appeared in the 2013 FIBA Under-19 World Championship, where they finished sixth. He is currently part of the senior men's roster in the 2021 FIBA AmeriCup qualification tournament.

== Personal life ==
Notice majored in broadcast journalism at South Carolina and aspires to enter sports broadcasting, upon the end of his playing career. He has a younger brother, Marcus Carr, who is also a professional basketball player. In 2020, following the increased spotlight on racial injustice, Notice partnered with former teammate MiKyle McIntosh and his team (Hamilton Honey Badgers) to spread his message and raise money for several charities through various means, including the auctioning off of an autographed jersey.
