= Mike White (basketball) =

American basketball coach (born 1977)

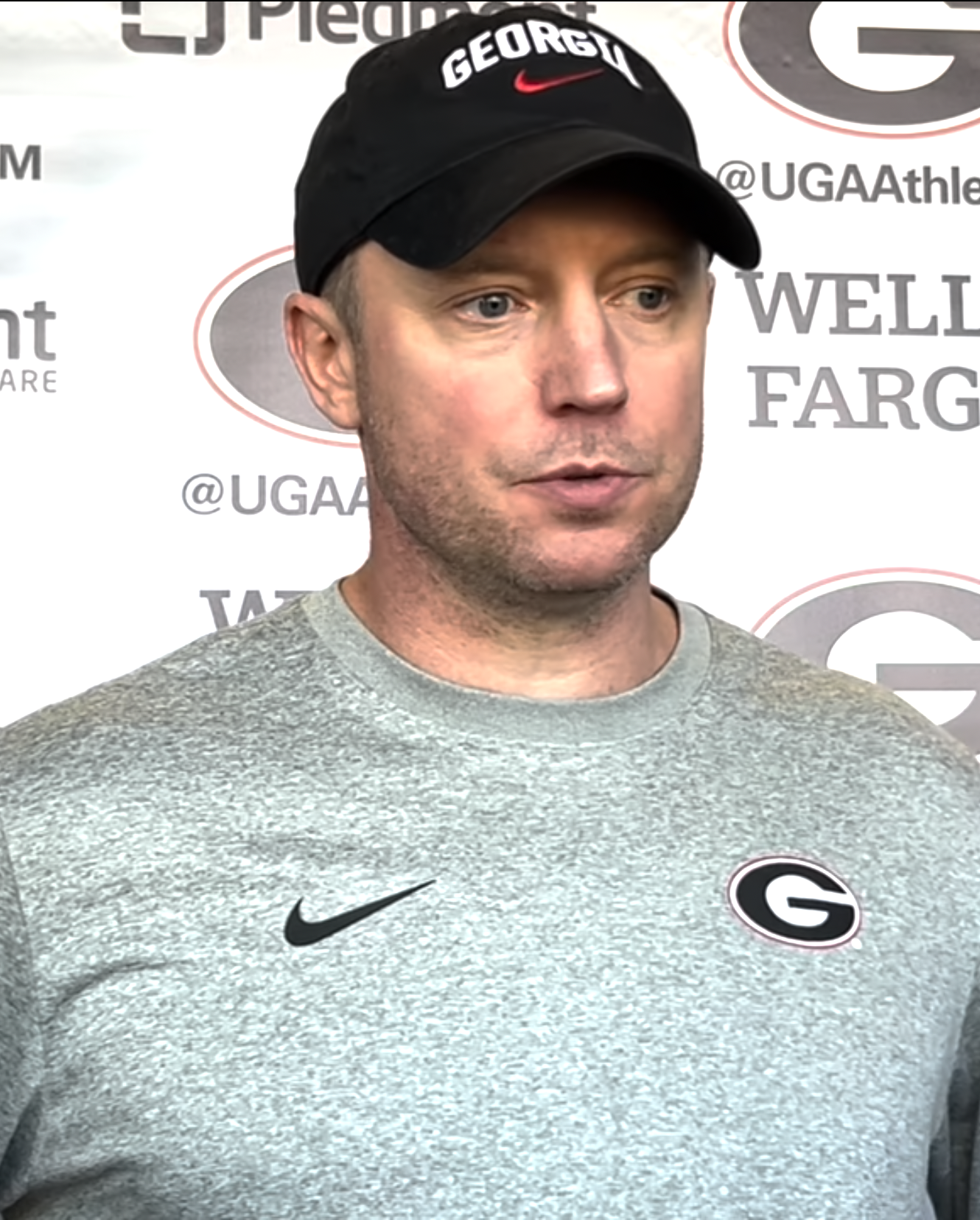
- Mike White speaks to media members in 2025.

Current position
- Title: Head coach
- Team: Georgia
- Conference: SEC
- Record: 84–57 (.596)

Biographical details
- Born: March 2, 1977 (age 49); Dunedin, Florida, U.S.

Playing career
- 1995–1999: Ole Miss
- 1999–2000: New Mexico Slam
- Position: Point guard

Coaching career (HC unless noted)
- 2000–2004: Jacksonville State (assistant)
- 2004–2011: Ole Miss (assistant)
- 2011–2015: Louisiana Tech
- 2015–2022: Florida
- 2022–present: Georgia

Head coaching record
- Overall: 327–185 (.639)
- Tournaments: 6–7 (NCAA Division I); 10–5 (NIT)

Accomplishments and honors

Championships
- WAC regular season (2013); 2 C-USA regular season (2014, 2015)

Awards
- WAC Coach of the Year (2013); C-USA Coach of the Year (2015); SEC Coach of the Year (2017)

Michael Emerson White (born March 2, 1977) is an American college basketball coach and former player. He is the head coach of the University of Georgia men's basketball team. Prior to accepting the job at Georgia, White was the head coach of the Florida Gators from 2015 to 2022 and the Louisiana Tech Bulldogs from 2011 to 2015.

== Playing career ==
White played at Ole Miss from 1995 to 1999. In 1995, White began his four-year collegiate career as a freshman guard for the Ole Miss Rebels men's basketball team. He became a starter in the eighth game of his freshman year and remained a starter for the remainder of his four years at Ole Miss. During White's college career, he had 370 assists, the 7th highest total in Ole Miss history. He also led his team to two SEC Western Division Titles, three consecutive NCAA men's basketball tournaments (1997, 1998, and 1999), and the first NCAA Tournament victory in the history of Ole Miss. He played professional basketball with the IBL's New Mexico Slam and internationally in England.

== Coaching career ==
=== Jacksonville State ===
After earning his bachelor's degree at Ole Miss, White joined the men's basketball coaching staff at Jacksonville State in 2000. White stayed at the university for four seasons where he was an assistant coach from 2000 to 2003 and the associate head coach from 2003 to 2004. During his time at Jacksonville State, he helped coordinate the team's recruiting activities. These efforts paid off as the men's basketball team achieved its greatest success since moving up to the Division I ranks, and five Jacksonville State recruits were named all-conference players during White's four-year stint. In 2002, Jacksonville State recorded its first conference tournament victory since moving up to Division I. The following year, Jacksonville State went 20–10 for the year marking the winningest season in the school's Division I history.

=== Ole Miss ===
White spent seven seasons (2005–2011) on the Ole Miss coaching staff and developed a reputation as one of the top assistant coaches in the country.

A finalist for the 2009 Coaches Award presented by BasketballScoop.com – honoring the top assistants in the college game – White was instrumental in the Rebels' rise to prominence in the Southeastern Conference as he helped lead the program to four postseason berths and a pair of SEC West titles in the past five years. The Rebels won 20 or more games four of the last five seasons.

White was very well known in the recruiting circles nationwide, especially in the Southern region of the country. He helped Ole Miss land three recruiting classes ranked in the Top 25 in the country by numerous recruiting publications, including the 2005 class that was ranked as high as No. 7 by Hoop Scoop.

In addition to his recruiting responsibilities, he worked closely with the Rebel guards, including helping Terrico White who earned the SEC Freshman of the Year award and Freshman All-America accolades in 2009. Ole Miss had five guards named all-SEC during the last five seasons and eight different guards that made seven or more three-pointers in one game during that stretch.

=== Louisiana Tech ===
On March 30, 2011, White was named by Louisiana Tech as the 17th head coach of the Bulldogs basketball team. He replaced the fired Kerry Rupp. In his first season, White led the program to their first appearance in the Western Athletic Conference Tournament Championship Game. By the next season, Louisiana Tech, although picked 4th by the Western Athletic Conference Pre-Season Coaches Poll, had a stretch of 18 straight wins leading to a conference championship tie, garnering the first AP ranking in over 20 years, and a NIT tournament win. The 2012–13 season saw the return of the Bulldogs winning their first conference title since the 1998–99 season.

In the 2013–14 season, the Bulldogs defeated Iona (home) and Georgia (away) before falling in the NIT quarterfinals by three at Florida State. Under White, Louisiana Tech won or tied for three straight conference regular season titles (2012–13, 2013–14, 2014–15), garnering three straight NIT appearances.

At the 100-game mark, he had the highest winning percentage and the most wins of any coach in Louisiana Tech history.

=== Florida ===
On May 7, 2015, White was named head coach of the Florida Gators, replacing long-time coach Billy Donovan who after 19 years left to become head coach of the NBA's Oklahoma City Thunder, which he coached until the 2019–20 season. White agreed to a six-year, $12 million deal with the Gators.

White's first Gators team managed to secure an invitation to the NIT after being on the NCAA Tournament bubble for much of the season. The Gators would go on to lose in the quarterfinals to eventual NIT Champion George Washington.

In White's second year in his tenure at Florida, White's team secured a 4 seed in the East Region of the 2017 NCAA Tournament, reaching the Elite Eight before being eliminated by SEC rival #7 seed South Carolina. The Gators would make the tournament over the next four seasons completed (2018, 2019, and 2021), never advancing past the round of 32.

White departed Florida on March 13, 2022, to take the head coaching position at SEC rival Georgia.

=== Georgia ===
On March 13, 2022, White was introduced as the head coach at Georgia.

== Personal life ==
As a result of White's father's career path, his family moved frequently throughout his childhood. In 1995, White graduated from Jesuit High School in New Orleans. From 1995 to 1999, he attended the University of Mississippi on a basketball scholarship. After a brief stint playing basketball professionally, White returned to Ole Miss and graduated with a bachelor's degree in business administration in 2000.

White is married to the former Kira Zschau, an All-SEC volleyball player at Ole Miss, who also has a J.D. degree from the university. The couple has two daughters, Rylee and Maggie, twin boys, Collin and Keegan, and a son, Dillon. White has four siblings, three of whom work in college athletics: Danny, who serves as the athletic director for the Tennessee Volunteers; Brian, the athletic director for the Virginia Tech Hokies; and Mariah Chappell, assistant athletic director for the SMU Mustangs.

== Head coaching record ==
Record table
Season	Team	Overall	Conference	Standing	Postseason
Louisiana Tech Bulldogs (Western Athletic Conference) (2011–2013)
2011–12	Louisiana Tech	18–16	6–8	T–5th	
2012–13	Louisiana Tech	27–7	16–2	T–1st	NIT Second Round
Louisiana Tech Bulldogs (Conference USA) (2013–2015)
2013–14	Louisiana Tech	29–8	13–3	T–1st	NIT Quarterfinals
2014–15	Louisiana Tech	27–9	15–3	1st	NIT Quarterfinals
Louisiana Tech:		101–40 (.716)	50–16 (.758)		
Florida Gators (Southeastern Conference) (2015–2022)
2015–16	Florida	21–15	9–9	T–8th	NIT Quarterfinals
2016–17	Florida	27–9	14–4	2nd	NCAA Division I Elite Eight
2017–18	Florida	21–13	11–7	3rd	NCAA Division I Round of 32
2018–19	Florida	20–16	9–9	8th	NCAA Division I Round of 32
2019–20	Florida	19–12	11–7	T–4th	
2020–21	Florida	15–10	9–7	5th	NCAA Division I Round of 32
2021–22	Florida	19–13	9–9	T–5th	
Florida:		142–88 (.617)	72–52 (.581)		
Georgia Bulldogs (Southeastern Conference) (2022–present)
2022–23	Georgia	16–16	6–12	11th	
2023–24	Georgia	20–17	6–12	T–11th	NIT Semifinals
2024–25	Georgia	20–13	8–10	T–9th	NCAA Division I Round of 64
2025–26	Georgia	22–11	10–8	T–7th	NCAA Division I Round of 64
2026–27	Georgia	6–0	0–0		
Georgia:		84–57 (.596)	29–42 (.408)		
Total:		327–185 (.639)			
National champion Postseason invitational champion Conference regular season champion Conference regular season and conference tournament champion Division regular season champion Division regular season and conference tournament champion Conference tournament champion

*The 2020 NCAA tournament was canceled due to concerns over the coronavirus pandemic.
