= Michael Carrera =

Venezuelan basketball player (born 1993)

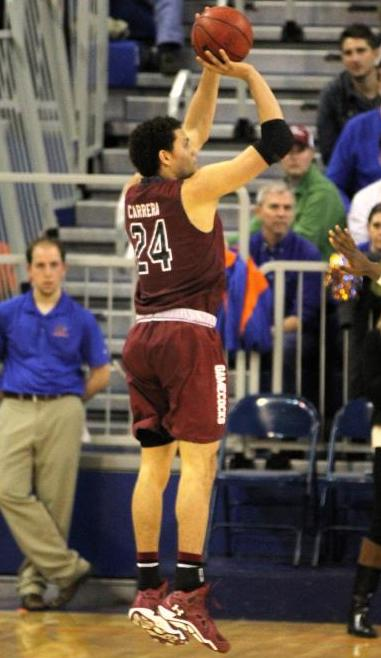
- Carrera in 2014

No. 24 – Diablos Rojos del México
- Position: Small forward
- League: LNBP

Personal information
- Born: 7 January 1993 (age 33) Barcelona, Venezuela
- Listed height: 1.96 m (6 ft 5 in)
- Listed weight: 180 lb (82 kg)

Career information
- High school: Montrose Christian School (Rockville, Maryland)
- College: South Carolina (2012–2016)
- NBA draft: 2016: undrafted
- Playing career: 2016–present

Career history
- 2016–2017: Avtodor Saratov
- 2017: Marinos de Anzoátegui
- 2017: Cairns Taipans
- 2018: Oklahoma City Blue
- 2018–2019: Soles de Mexicali
- 2019: Obras Sanitarias
- 2019: Trotamundos de Carabobo
- 2019: Brose Bamberg
- 2019–2020: Hamburg Towers
- 2020: Supersónicos de Miranda
- 2020–2021: Força Lleida
- 2021: Guaiqueríes de Margarita
- 2021–2022: Força Lleida
- 2022: Gladiadores de Anzoátegui
- 2022–2023: Força Lleida
- 2023: Gran Canaria
- 2023: Gladiadores de Anzoátegui
- 2023–2024: Estudiantes
- 2024: Gladiadores de Anzoátegui
- 2024–present: Diablos Rojos del México
- 2025–2026: Astros de Jalisco
- 2026–present: Spartans Distrito Capital

Career highlights
- LNBP champion (2018); Copa LPB champion (2019); SPB champion (2023); Copa Princesa de Asturias champion (2024)

Michael Alberto Carrera Gamboa (born 7 January 1993) is a Venezuelan professional basketball player for the Spartans Distrito Capital of the Superliga Profesional de Baloncesto (SPB) and the Venezuela national team.

== College career ==
Carrera played college basketball for South Carolina. During his time there he averaged 14.5 points, 7.7 rebounds and 1.1 assists per game.

== Professional career ==
In the 2016-2017 basketball season, Carrera played for the Russian side BC Avtodor Saratov where he averaged 7 points, 4.6 rebounds and 1.1 assists per game. He moved to the Australian side Cairns Taipans in 2017 where he averaged 14.3 points, 3.6 rebounds and 1 assists per contest. He moved to the NBA G League side Oklahoma City Blue in late 2017 where he averaged 7 points, 4.2 rebounds and 0.6 assists per game. He moved to the Argentine side Obras Sanitarias in 2018 where he averaged 6.9 points, 4.9 rebounds and 0.4 assists per game.

On 19 September 2019, he has signed with Brose Bamberg of the Basketball Bundesliga (BBL).

On 26 November 2019, he signed with another club BBL club, Hamburg Towers. Carrera averaged 13.3 points and 5.0 rebounds per game for the Towers in 2019–20.

On 17 October 2020, Carrera signed with Supersonicos de Miranda of the Venezuelan SuperLiga Profesional de Baloncesto. On 14 July 2021, Carrera signed with Força Lleida of the LEB Oro.

On 15 March 2023, he signed with Gran Canaria of the Spanish Liga ACB.

== National team career ==
Carrera represents the Venezuela national team. He represented the team at the 2019 FIBA World Cup, where he averaged 10 points, 5 rebounds and 1 assist during the tournament.
