= 2016–17 Southeastern Conference men's basketball season =

- League: NCAA Division I
- Sport: Basketball
- Teams: 14
- TV partner(s): CBS, ESPN, SEC Network

Regular Season
- 2017 SEC Champions: Kentucky
- Season MVP: Malik Monk, Kentucky and Sindarius Thornwell, South Carolina
- Top scorer: Sindarius Thornwell, South Carolina

SEC Tournament
- Venue: Bridgestone Arena, Nashville, Tennessee
- Champions: Kentucky
- Runners-up: Arkansas
- Finals MVP: De'Aaron Fox, Kentucky

Basketball seasons
- ← 2015–16 2017–18 →

2016–17 Southeastern Conference men's basketball standings
| | Conf. | | | | Overall |
| Team | W | | L | PCT | W | | L | PCT |
|---|---|---|---|---|---|---|---|---|
| No. 6 Kentucky † | 16 | – | 2 | .889 | 32 | – | 6 | .842 |
| No. 20 Florida | 14 | – | 4 | .778 | 27 | – | 9 | .750 |
| Arkansas | 12 | – | 6 | .667 | 26 | – | 10 | .722 |
| South Carolina | 12 | – | 6 | .667 | 26 | – | 11 | .703 |
| Ole Miss | 10 | – | 8 | .556 | 22 | – | 14 | .611 |
| Alabama | 10 | – | 8 | .556 | 19 | – | 15 | .559 |
| Vanderbilt | 10 | – | 8 | .556 | 19 | – | 16 | .543 |
| Georgia | 9 | – | 9 | .500 | 19 | – | 15 | .559 |
| Texas A&M | 8 | – | 10 | .444 | 16 | – | 15 | .516 |
| Tennessee | 8 | – | 10 | .444 | 16 | – | 16 | .500 |
| Auburn | 7 | – | 11 | .389 | 18 | – | 14 | .563 |
| Mississippi State | 6 | – | 12 | .333 | 16 | – | 16 | .500 |
| LSU | 2 | – | 16 | .111 | 10 | – | 21 | .323 |
| Missouri | 2 | – | 16 | .111 | 8 | – | 24 | .250 |
† 2017 SEC tournament winner Rankings from AP poll

The 2016–17 Southeastern Conference men's basketball season began with practices in October 2016, followed by the start of the 2016–17 NCAA Division I men's basketball season in November. Conference play started in early January 2017 and concluded in March, after which 14 member teams participated in the 2017 SEC tournament at Bridgestone Arena in Nashville, Tennessee, with the tournament champion guaranteed a selection to the 2017 NCAA tournament.

== Preseason ==
SEC recruits at the 2016 McDonald's All-American Boys Game

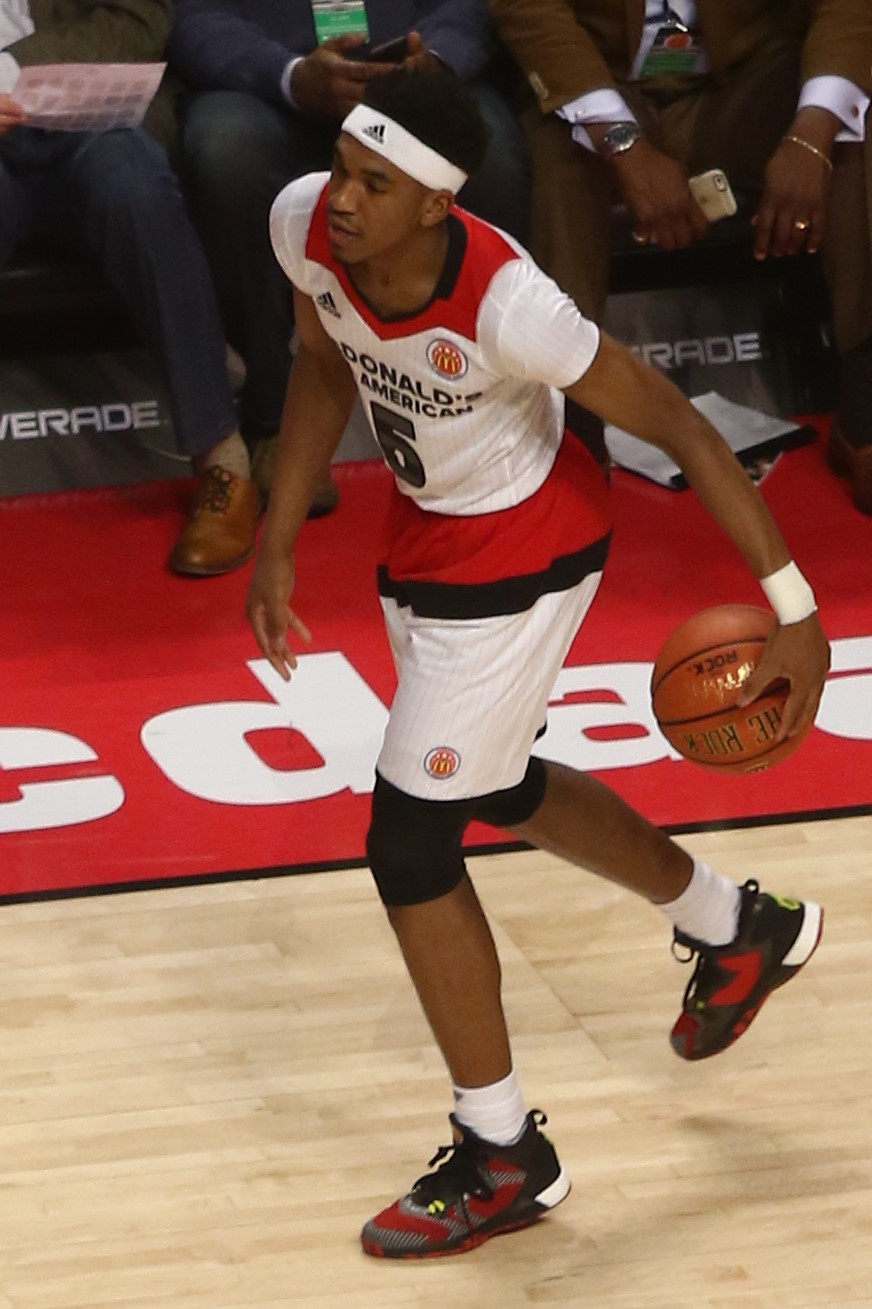
Malik Monk, Kentucky

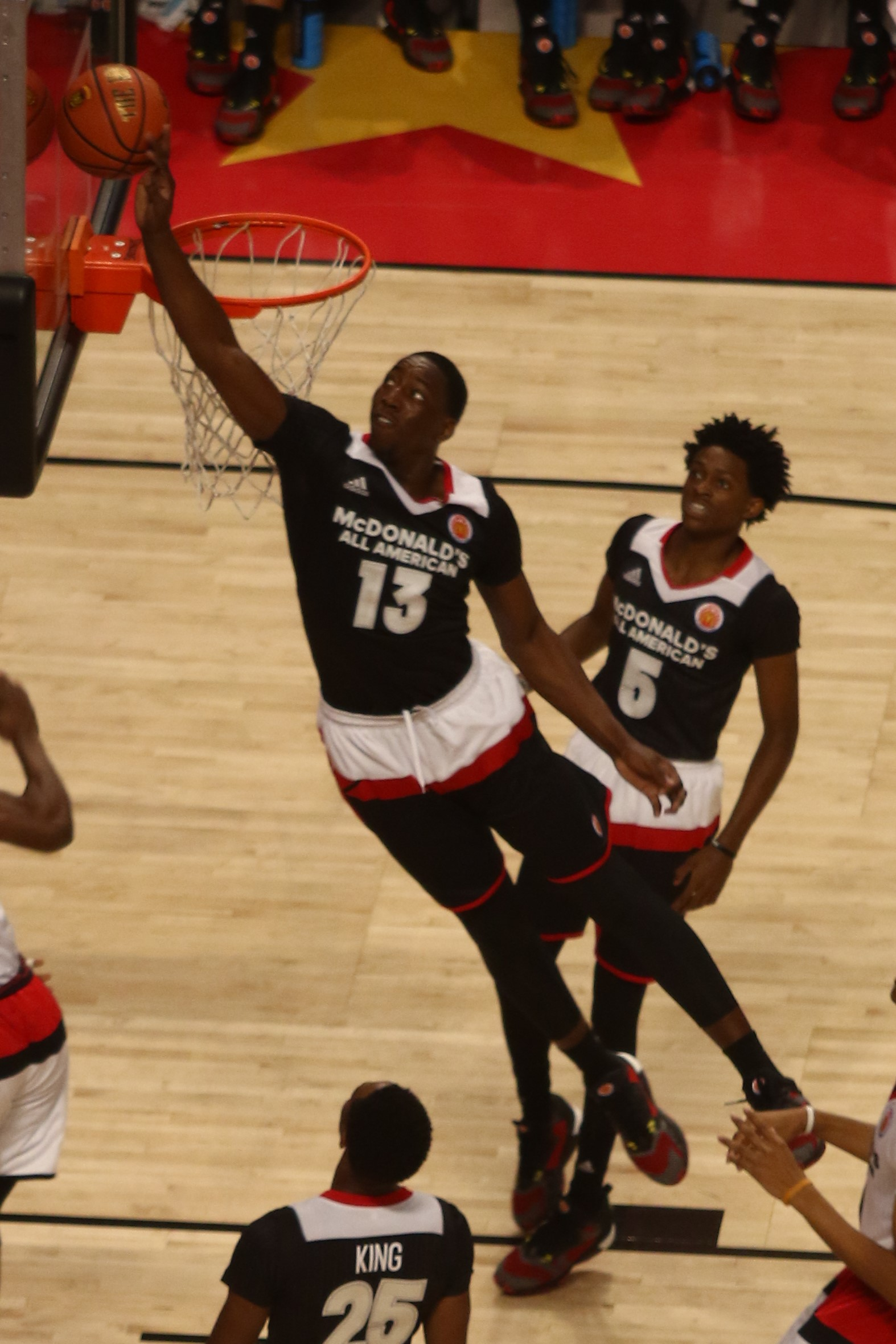
Bam Adebayo, Kentucky

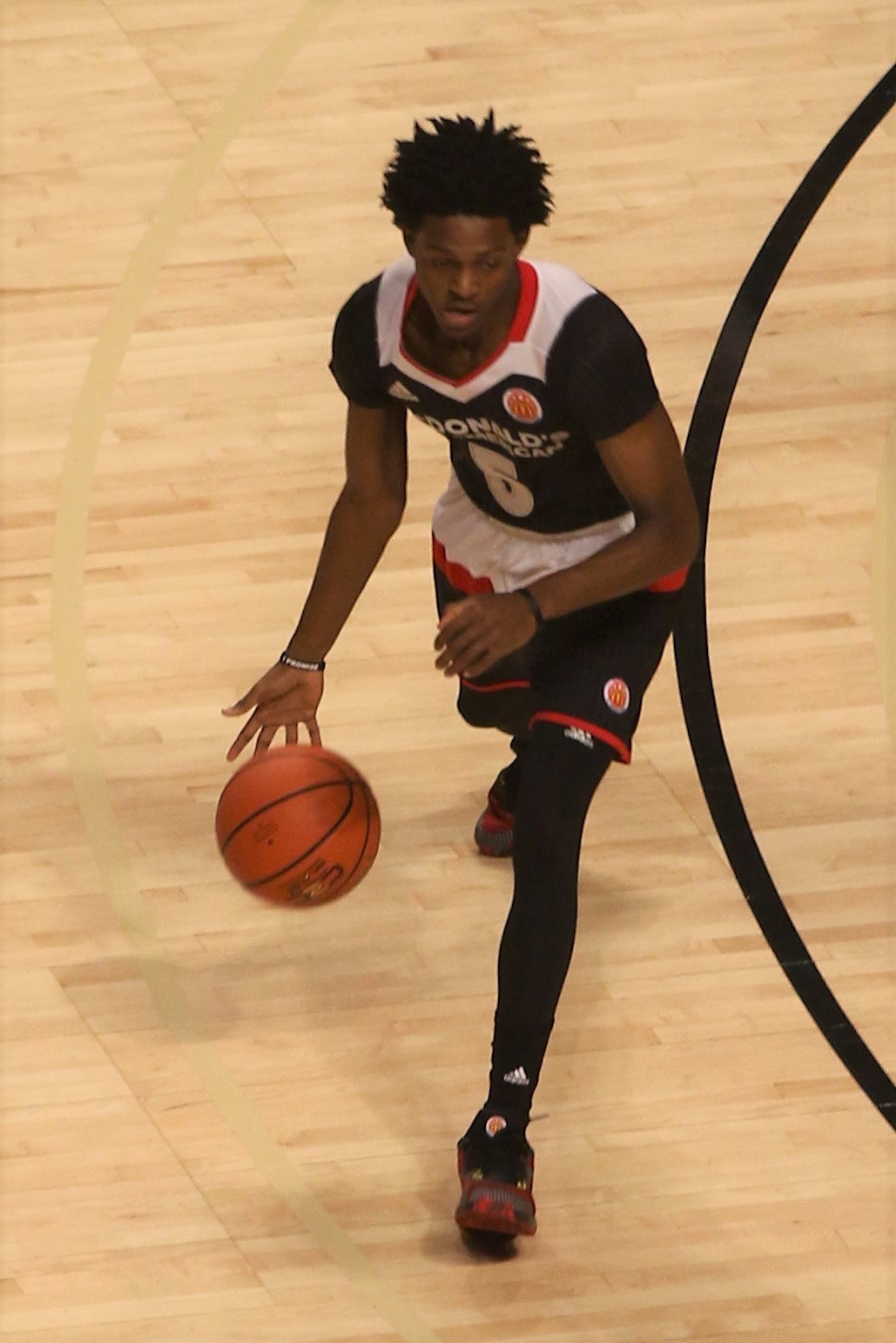
De'Aaron Fox, Kentucky

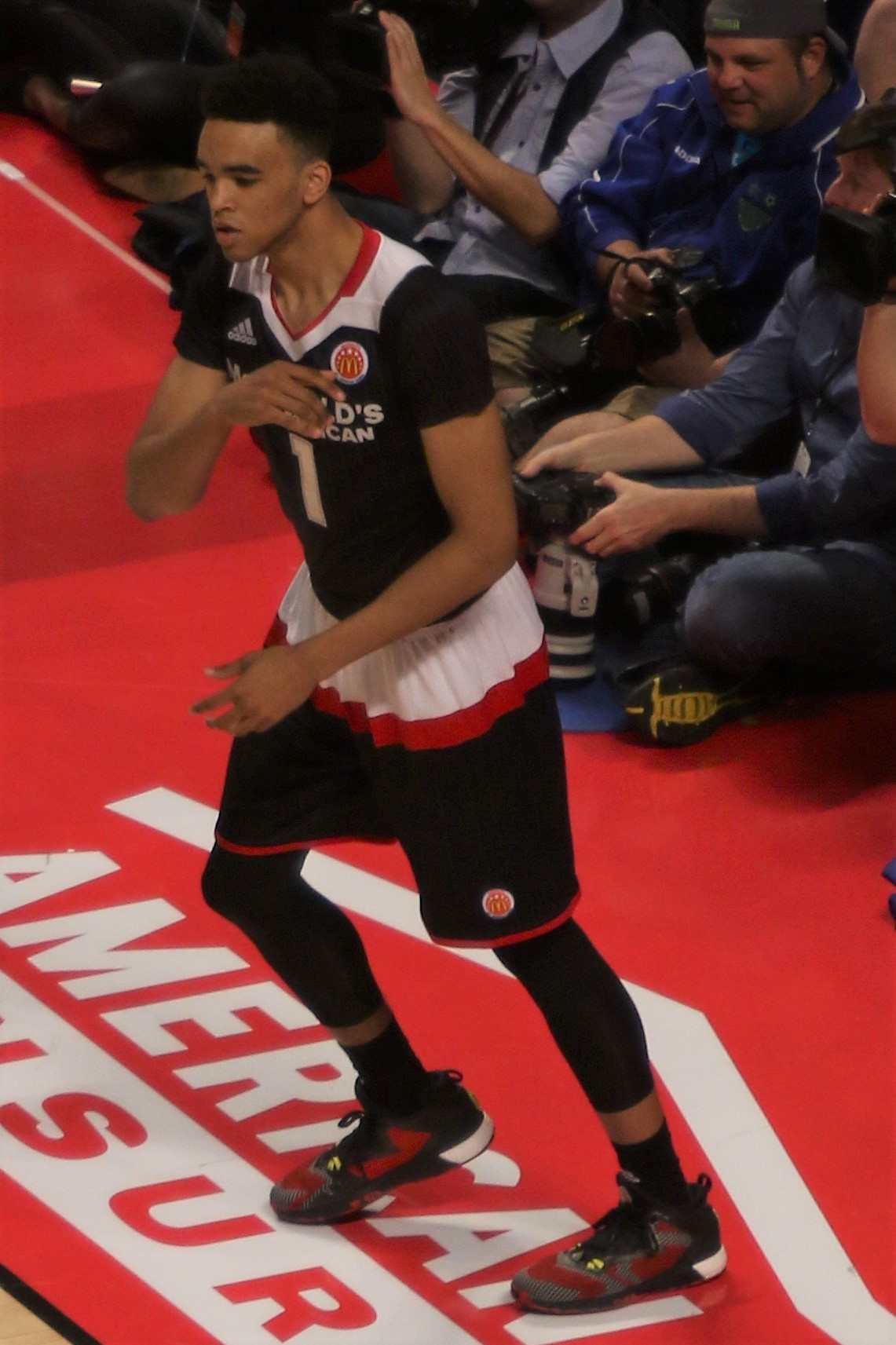
Sacha Killeya-Jones, Kentucky

=== Media Day Selections ===
| | Media |
| 1. | Kentucky |
| 2. | Florida |
| 3. | Texas A&M |
| 4. | Georgia |
| 5. | Arkansas |
| 6. | Vanderbilt |
| 7. | Alabama |
| 8. | South Carolina |
| 9. | Ole Miss |
| 10. | Mississippi State |
| 11. | Auburn |
| 12. | LSU |
| 13. | Tennessee |
| 14. | Missouri |

() first place votes

=== Preseason All-SEC teams ===
Media
**Moses Kingsley Arkansas**
J. J. Frazier Georgia
Edrice Adebayo Kentucky
De'Aaron Fox Kentucky
Tyler Davis Texas A&M

- Coaches select 8 players
- Players in bold are choices for SEC Player of the Year

== Head coaches ==
Note: Stats shown are before the beginning of the season. Overall and SEC records are from time at current school.

| Team | Head coach | Previous job | Season at school | Overall record | SEC record | NCAA Tournaments | NCAA Final Fours | NCAA Championships |
|---|---|---|---|---|---|---|---|---|
| Alabama | Avery Johnson | Brooklyn Nets | 2nd | 18–15 | 8–10 | 0 | 0 | 0 |
| Arkansas | Mike Anderson | Missouri | 6th | 102–54 | 58–40 | 1 | 0 | 0 |
| Auburn | Bruce Pearl | Tennessee | 3rd | 26–40 | 9–27 | 0 | 0 | 0 |
| Florida | Mike White | Louisiana Tech | 2nd | 21–15 | 9–9 | 0 | 0 | 0 |
| Georgia | Mark Fox | Nevada | 8th | 125–102 | 61–59 | 2 | 0 | 0 |
| Kentucky | John Calipari | Memphis | 8th | 217–47 | 95–25 | 6 | 4 | 1 |
| LSU | Johnny Jones | North Texas | 5th | 80–51 | 40–32 | 1 | 0 | 0 |
| Mississippi State | Ben Howland | UCLA | 2nd | 14–17 | 7–11 | 0 | 0 | 0 |
| Missouri | Kim Anderson | Central Missouri | 3rd | 19–44 | 6–30 | 0 | 0 | 0 |
| Ole Miss | Andy Kennedy | Cincinnati | 11th | 212–126 | 88–80 | 2 | 0 | 0 |
| South Carolina | Frank Martin | Kansas State | 5th | 89–65 | 32–48 | 0 | 0 | 0 |
| Tennessee | Rick Barnes | Texas | 2nd | 15–19 | 6–12 | 0 | 0 | 0 |
| Texas A&M | Billy Kennedy | Murray State | 6th | 99–70 | 39–34 | 1 | 0 | 0 |
| Vanderbilt | Bryce Drew | Valparaiso | 1st | 0–0 | 0–0 | 0 | 0 | 0 |

== Rankings ==
Legend
| Increase in ranking |
| Decrease in ranking |
| First ranking |

| | | Pre | Wk 2 | Wk 3 | Wk 4 | Wk 5 | Wk 6 | Wk 7 | Wk 8 | Wk 9 | Wk 10 | Wk 11 | Wk 12 | Wk 13 | Wk 14 | Wk 15 | Wk 16 | Wk 17 | Wk 18 | Wk 19 | Final |
|---|---|---|---|---|---|---|---|---|---|---|---|---|---|---|---|---|---|---|---|---|---|
| Alabama | AP | | | | | | | | | | | | | | | | | | | | |
| Alabama | C | | | | | | | | | | | | | | | | | | | | |
| Arkansas | AP | | | | | | | | RV | | | | | | | | | RV | RV | | |
| Arkansas | C | RV | RV | RV | | RV | RV | RV | RV | | | | | | | | | RV | RV | | |
| Auburn | AP | | | | | | | | | | | | | | | | | | | | |
| Auburn | C | | | | | | | | | | | | | | | | | | | | |
| Florida | AP | RV | RV | RV | 24 | 21 | RV | RV | 25 | 24 | 23 | 19 | 25 | 24 | 17 | 15 | 13 | 12 | 17 | 20 | |
| Florida | C | RV | RV | RV | RV | 21 | RV | RV | RV | 24 | 23 | 21 | 25 | 23 | 17 | 13 | 12 | 12 | 13 | 17 | 10 |
| Georgia | AP | | | | | | | | | | | | | | | | | | | | |
| Georgia | C | RV | | | | | | | | | | | | | | | | | | | |
| Kentucky | AP | 2 | 2 | 1 | 1 | 6 | 6 | 6 | 8 | 6 | 6 | 5 | 4 | 8 | 15 | 13 | 11 | 9 | 8 | 6 | |
| Kentucky | C | 4 | 2 | 1 | 1 | 7 | 7 | 5 | 8 | 6 | 6 | 5 | 4 | 6 | 12 | 11 | 10 | 9 | 8 | 5 | 5 |
| LSU | AP | | | | | | | | | | | | | | | | | | | | |
| LSU | C | | | | | | | | | | | | | | | | | | | | |
| Mississippi State | AP | RV | RV | | | | | | | | | | | | | | | | | | |
| Mississippi State | C | | | | | | | | | | | | | | | | | | | | |
| Missouri | AP | | | | | | | | | | | | | | | | | | | | |
| Missouri | C | | | | | | | | | | | | | | | | | | | | |
| Ole Miss | AP | | | | | | | | | | | | | | | | | | | | |
| Ole Miss | C | | | | | | | | | | | | | | | | | | | | |
| South Carolina | AP | | | | 20 | 19 | 16 | 22 | RV | | RV | 24 | 23 | 19 | 19 | 21 | RV | | | | |
| South Carolina | C | | | | 23 | 18 | 15 | 20 | 25 | RV | RV | 24 | 24 | 20 | 16 | 19 | RV | RV | RV | | |
| Tennessee | AP | | | | | | | | | | | | | | | | | | | | |
| Tennessee | C | | | | | | | | | | | | | | | | | | | | |
| Texas A&M | AP | RV | RV | | | | | | | | | | | | | | | | | | |
| Texas A&M | C | RV | RV | RV | RV | RV | | | | | | | | | | | | | | | |
| Vanderbilt | AP | | | | | | | | | | | | | | | | | | | | |
| Vanderbilt | C | | | | | | | | | | | | | | | | | | | | |

== SEC regular season ==
This table summarizes the head-to-head results between teams in conference play.

| | Alabama | Arkansas | Auburn | Florida | Georgia | Kentucky | LSU | Mississippi State | Missouri | Ole Miss | South Carolina | Tennessee | Texas A&M | Vanderbilt |
| vs. Alabama | – | 1–0 | 2–0 | 1–0 | 1–1 | 1–0 | 0–2 | 0–2 | 0–2 | 0–1 | 0–1 | 1–0 | 1–0 | 0–1 |
| vs. Arkansas | 0–1 | – | 0–1 | 2–0 | 0–1 | 1–0 | 0–2 | 1–0 | 1–1 | 0–1 | 0–1 | 0–1 | 0–2 | 1–1 |
| vs. Auburn | 0–2 | 1–0 | – | 1–0 | 2–0 | 1–0 | 0–2 | 0–1 | 0–2 | 0–2 | 0–1 | 1–0 | 1–0 | 1–0 |
| vs. Florida | 0–1 | 0–2 | 0–1 | – | 0–2 | 1–1 | 0–1 | 0–1 | 0–1 | 0–1 | 1–1 | 0–1 | 0–1 | 2–0 |
| vs. Georgia | 1–1 | 1–0 | 0–2 | 2–0 | – | 2–0 | 0–1 | 0–1 | 0–1 | 0–1 | 1–0 | 0–1 | 1–0 | 0–1 |
| vs. Kentucky | 0–1 | 0–1 | 0–1 | 1–1 | 0–2 | – | 0–1 | 0–1 | 0–1 | 0–1 | 0–1 | 1–1 | 0–2 | 0–2 |
| vs. LSU | 2–0 | 2–0 | 2–0 | 1–0 | 1–0 | 1–0 | – | 2–0 | 0–1 | 1–0 | 1–0 | 0–1 | 2–0 | 1–0 |
| vs. Miss. State | 2–0 | 0–1 | 1–0 | 1–0 | 1–0 | 1–0 | 0–2 | – | 0–1 | 2–0 | 1–0 | 0–1 | 0–1 | 1–0 |
| vs. Missouri | 2–0 | 1–1 | 2–0 | 1–0 | 1–0 | 1–0 | 1–0 | 1–0 | – | 2–0 | 1–0 | 1–0 | 2–0 | 0–1 |
| vs. Ole Miss | 1–0 | 1–0 | 0–2 | 1–0 | 1–0 | 1–0 | 0–1 | 0–2 | 0–2 | – | 1–1 | 1–1 | 1–0 | 0–1 |
| vs. South Carolina | 1–0 | 1–0 | 0–1 | 1–1 | 0–1 | 1–0 | 0–1 | 0–1 | 0–1 | 1–1 | – | 0–2 | 0–1 | 1–0 |
| vs. Tennessee | 0–1 | 1–0 | 0–1 | 1–0 | 1–0 | 1–1 | 1–0 | 1–0 | 0–1 | 1–1 | 2–0 | – | 0–1 | 1–1 |
| vs. Texas A&M | 0–1 | 2–0 | 0–1 | 1–0 | 0–1 | 2–0 | 0–2 | 1–0 | 2–0 | 0–1 | 1–0 | 1–0 | – | 2–0 |
| vs. Vanderbilt | 1–0 | 1–1 | 0–1 | 0–2 | 1–0 | 2–0 | 0–1 | 0–1 | 1–0 | 1–0 | 0–1 | 1–1 | 0–2 | – |
| Total | 10–8 | 12–6 | 7–11 | 14–4 | 9–9 | 16–2 | 2–16 | 6–12 | 2–16 | 10–8 | 12–6 | 8–10 | 8–10 | 10–8 |

== Postseason ==
=== SEC Tournament ===
- March, 12 at the Bridgestone Arena, Nashville, Tennessee. Teams will be seeded by conference record, with ties broken by record between the tied teams followed by record against the regular-season champion, if necessary.

**2016 SEC men's basketball tournament seeds and results**
| Seed | School | Conf. | Over. | Tiebreaker | First round March 9 | Second round March 10 | Quarterfinals March 11 | Semifinals March 12 | Championship March 13 |
| 1. | ‡**Kentucky** | 16–2 | 26–5 | | Bye | Bye | vs. #8 Georgia **W, 71–60** | vs. #5 Alabama **W, 79–74** | vs. #3 Arkansas **W, 82–65** |
| 2. | †**Florida** | 14–4 | 24–7 | | Bye | Bye | vs. #7 Vanderbilt **L, 62–72** | | |
| 3. | †**Arkansas** | 12–6 | 23–8 | 1–0 vs. South Carolina | Bye | Bye | vs. #6 Ole Miss **W, 73–72** | vs. #7 Vanderbilt **W, 76–62** | vs. #1 Kentucky **L, 65–82** |
| 4. | †**South Carolina** | 12–5 | 22–8 | 0–1 vs. Arkansas | Bye | Bye | vs. #5 Alabama **L, 53–64** | | |
| 5. | #**Alabama** | 10–8 | 17–13 | 2–0 vs Miss/Van | Bye | vs. #12 Mississippi State **W, 75–65** | vs. #4 South Carolina **W, 64–53** | vs. #1 Kentucky **L, 74–79** | |
| 6. | #**Ole Miss** | 10–8 | 19–12 | 1–1 vs. Bama/Van | Bye | vs. #14 Missouri **W, 86–74** | vs. #3 Arkansas **L, 72–73** | | |
| 7. | #**Vanderbilt** | 10–8 | 17–14 | 0–2 vs. Bama/Miss | Bye | vs. #10 Texas A&M **W, 66–41** | vs. #2 Florida **W, 72–62** | vs. #3 Arkansas **L, 62–76** | |
| 8. | #**Georgia** | 9–9 | 18–13 | | Bye | vs. #9 Tennessee **W, 59–57** | vs. #1 Kentucky **L, 60–71** | | |
| 9. | #**Tennessee** | 8–10 | 16–15 | 1–0 vs. Texas A&M | Bye | vs. #8 Georgia **L, 57–59** | | | |
| 10. | #**Texas A&M** | 8–10 | 16–14 | 0–1 vs Tennessee | Bye | vs. #7 Vanderbilt **L, 41–66** | | | |
| 11. | #**Auburn** | 7–11 | 18–13 | | vs. #14 Missouri **L, 83–86** | | | | |
| 12. | **Mississippi State** | 6–12 | 15–15 | | vs. #13 LSU **W, 79-52** | vs. #5 Alabama **L, 55–75** | | | |
| 13. | **LSU** | 2–15 | 10–19 | | vs. #12 Mississippi State **L, 52–79** | | | | |
| 14. | **Missouri** | 2–16 | 7–23 | | vs. #11 Auburn **W, 86–83** | vs. #6 Ole Miss **L, 74–86** | | | |
‡ – SEC regular season champions, and tournament No. 1 seed. † – Received a double-Bye in the conference tournament. # – Received a single-Bye in the conference tournament. Overall records include all games played in the SEC tournament.

=== NCAA tournament ===
| Seed | Region | School | First Four | Second round | Third round | Sweet 16 | Elite Eight | Final Four |
|---|---|---|---|---|---|---|---|---|
| 2 | South | **Kentucky** | | #15 Northern Kentucky **W 79–70** – (Indianapolis) | #10 Wichita State **W 65–62** – (Indianapolis) | #3 UCLA **W 86-75** – (Memphis) | #1 North Carolina **L 73-75** – (Memphis) | |
| 4 | East | **Florida** | | #13 East Tennessee State **W 80–65** – (Orlando) | #5 Virginia **W 65–39** – (Orlando) | #8 Wisconsin **W 84-83** – (New York) | #7 South Carolina **L 70-77** – (New York) | |
| 7 | East | **South Carolina** | | #10 Marquette **W 93–73** – (Greenville) | #2 Duke **W 88–81** – (Greenville) | #3 Baylor **W 70-50** – (New York) | #4 Florida **W 77-70** – (New York) | #1 Gonzaga **L 73-77** – (Glendale) |
| 8 | South | **Arkansas** | | #9 Seton Hall **W 77–71** – (Greenville) | #1 North Carolina **L 65–72** – (Greenville) | | | |
| 9 | West | **Vanderbilt** | | #8 Northwestern **L 66–68** – (Salt Lake City) | | | | |

== Honors and awards ==
=== Players of the Week ===
Throughout the conference regular season, the SEC offices named one or two players of the week and one or two freshmen of the week each Monday.

| Week | Player of the week | Freshman of the week |
|---|---|---|
| November 14, 2016 | Duop Reath, LSU | De'Aaron Fox, UK |
| November 21, 2016 | Sebastian Saiz, MISS | Malik Monk, UK |
| November 28, 2016 | Sindarius Thornwell, SC | Robert Williams, A&M |
| December 5, 2016 | PJ Dozier, SC | De'Aaron Fox (2), UK |
| December 12, 2016 | Tyler Davis, A&M | Jordan Bowden, UT |
| December 19, 2016 | Malik Monk, UK | De'Aaron Fox (3), UK |
| December 26, 2016 | Detrick Mostella, UT | Jared Harper, AUB |
| January 2, 2017 | Yante Maten, UGA | Malik Monk (2), UK |
| January 2, 2017 | Isaiah Briscoe, UK | Malik Monk (2), UK |
| January 9, 2017 | KeVaughn Allen, UF | De'Aaron Fox (4), UK |
| January 16, 2017 | Quinndary Weatherspoon, MSU | Malik Monk (3), UK |
| January 23, 2017 | Terence Davis, MISS | Austin Wiley, AUB |
| January 30, 2017 | Robert Hubbs III, UT | Braxton Key, BAMA |
| February 6, 2017 | Chris Chiozza, UF | Jared Harper (2), AUB |
| February 13, 2017 | Sindarius Thornwell (2), SC | Grant Williams, UT |
| February 13, 2017 | Sindarius Thornwell (2), SC | Robert Williams (2), A&M |
| February 20, 2017 | Daryl Macon, ARK | Robert Williams (3), A&M |
| February 27, 2017 | J. J. Frazier, UGA | Edrice Adebayo, UK |
| March 6, 2017 | Luke Kornet, VAN | Bam Adebayo (2), UK |

=== All-SEC Awards ===
==== Coaches ====
**2017 SEC Men's Basketball Individual Awards**
| Award | Recipient(s) |
| Player of the Year | Sindarius Thornwell, South Carolina |
| Coach of the Year | Mike White, Florida |
| Defensive Player of the Year | Robert Williams, Texas A&M |
| Freshman of the Year | Malik Monk, Kentucky |
| Scholar-Athlete of the Year | Luke Kornet, Vanderbilt |
| Sixth Man Award | Canyon Barry, Florida |

**2017 SEC Men's Basketball All-Conference Teams**
| First Team | Second Team | All-Freshman Team | All-Defensive Team |
| KeVaughn Allen So., G, Florida; J. J. Frazier Sr., G, Georgia; De'Aaron Fox Fr., G, Kentucky; Luke Kornet Sr., C, Vanderbilt; Yante Maten Jr., F, Georgia; Malik Monk Fr., G, Kentucky; Sebastian Saiz Sr., F, Ole Miss; Sindarius Thornwell Sr., G, South Carolina | Bam Adebayo Fr., F, Kentucky; Antonio Blakeney So., G, LSU; Tyler Davis So., C, Texas A&M; Kasey Hill Sr., G, Florida; Robert Hubbs Sr., G, Tennessee; Moses Kingsley Sr., C, Arkansas; Quinndary Weatherspoon So., F, Miss State; Robert Williams Fr., F, Texas A&M | Braxton Key Alabama; Mustapha Heron Auburn; Bam Adebayo Kentucky; De'Aaron Fox Kentucky; Malik Monk Kentucky; Lamar Peters Miss State; Grant WilliamsTennessee; Robert Williams Texas A&M | Kasey Hill Sr., G, Florida; Moses Kingsley Sr., C, Arkansas; Luke Kornet Sr., C, Vanderbilt; Sindarius Thornwell Sr., G, South Carolina; Robert Williams Fr., F, Texas A&M |
† - denotes unanimous selection

==== AP ====
**2017 SEC Men's Basketball Individual Awards**
| Award | Recipient(s) |
| Player of the Year | Malik Monk, Kentucky |
| Coach of the Year | Mike White, Florida |
| Newcomer of the Year | Malik Monk, Kentucky |

**2017 SEC Men's Basketball All-Conference Teams**
| First Team | Second Team |
| J. J. Frazier Sr., G, Georgia; De'Aaron Fox Fr., G, Kentucky †Malik Monk Fr., G, Kentucky; Sebastian Saiz Sr., F, Ole Miss †Sindarius Thornwell Sr., G, South Carolina | Bam Adebayo Fr., F, Kentucky; KeVaughn Allen So., G, Florida; Moses Kingsley Sr., C, Arkansas; Yante Maten Jr., F, Georgia; Robert Williams Fr., F, Texas A&M |
† - denotes unanimous selection

=== SEC Tournament Awards ===
**2017 SEC Men's Basketball Tournament Awards**
| Award | Recipient(s) |
| SEC Tournament MVP | De'Aaron Fox, Kentucky |

**2017 SEC Men's Basketball All-Tournament Team**
First Team
Bam Adebayo Fr., F, Kentucky
†De'Aaron Fox Fr., G, Kentucky
Dominique Hawkins Sr., G, Kentucky
Riley LaChance Jr., G, Vanderbilt
Daryl Macon Jr., G, Arkansas
† - denotes MVP

== NBA draft ==
| Rnd. | Pick | Player | Pos. | Team | School |
|---|---|---|---|---|---|
| 1 | 5 | De'Aaron Fox | PG | Sacramento Kings | Kentucky (Fr.) |
| 1 | 11 | Malik Monk | SG | Charlotte Hornets | Kentucky (Fr.) |
| 1 | 14 | Bam Adebayo | PF | Miami Heat | Kentucky (Fr.) |
| 2 | 48 | Sindarius Thornwell | SG | Milwaukee Bucks | South Carolina (Jr.) |
