= Arkansas Razorbacks men's basketball statistical leaders =

The Arkansas Razorbacks men's basketball statistical leaders are individual statistical leaders of the Arkansas Razorbacks men's basketball program in various categories, including points, rebounds, assists, steals, and blocks. Within those areas, the lists identify single-game, single-season, and career leaders. The Razorbacks represent Arkansas University in the NCAA's Southeastern Conference.

Arkansas began competing in intercollegiate basketball in 1924. However, the school's record book does not generally list records from before the 1950s, as records from before this period are often incomplete and inconsistent. Since scoring was much lower in this era, and teams played much fewer games during a typical season, it is likely that few or no players from this era would appear on these lists anyway.

The NCAA did not officially record assists as a stat until the 1983–84 season, and blocks and steals until the 1985–86 season, but Arkansas's record books includes players in these stats before these seasons. These lists are updated through the end of the 2019–20 season.

== Scoring ==
Career
Rk	Player	Points	Seasons
1	Todd Day	2,395	1988–89 1989–90 1990–91 1991–92
2	Sidney Moncrief	2,066	1975–76 1976–77 1977–78 1978–79
3	Lee Mayberry	1,940	1988–89 1989–90 1990–91 1991–92
4	Scott Hastings	1,779	1978–79 1979–80 1980–81 1981–82
5	Pat Bradley	1,765	1995–96 1996–97 1997–98 1998–99
6	Joe Kleine	1,753	1982–83 1983–84 1984–85
7	Marvin Delph	1,742	1974–75 1975–76 1976–77 1977–78
8	Corliss Williamson	1,728	1992–93 1993–94 1994–95
9	Oliver Miller	1,674	1988–89 1989–90 1990–91 1991–92
10	Scotty Thurman	1,650	1992–93 1993–94 1994–95

Season
Rk	Player	Points	Season
1	Darius Acuff Jr.	845	2025-26
2	Todd Day	786	1990–91
3	Joe Kleine	773	1984–85
4	Corliss Williamson	764	1994–95
5	Martin Terry	735	1972–73
6	Corliss Williamson	695	1993–94
7	Todd Day	684	1989–90
8	Mason Jones	683	2019–20
9	Sidney Moncrief	660	1978–79
	JD Notae	660	2021–22

Single game
Rk	Player	Points	Season	Opponent
1	Rotnei Clarke	51	2009–10	Alcorn State
2	Darius Acuff Jr.	49	2025-26	Alabama
3	Martin Terry	47	1972–73	SMU
4	Martin Terry	46	1971–72	Texas A&M
5	Dean Tolson	45	1973–74	Texas A&M
6	Martin Terry	43	1972–73	Memphis
	Todd Day	43	1991–92	LSU
8	Khalif Battle	42	2023–24	Missouri
9	Ricky Sugg	41	1965–66	Centenary
	Dean Tolson	41	1973–74	Indiana State
	Joe Kleine	41	1984–85	Iowa State
	Mason Jones	41	2019–20	Tulsa

== Rebounds ==
Career
Rk	Player	Rebounds	Seasons
1	Sidney Moncrief	1,015	1975–76 1976–77 1977–78 1978–79
2	Derek Hood	1,002	1995–96 1996–97 1997–98 1998–99
3	Oliver Miller	886	1988–89 1989–90 1990–91 1991–92
4	Dean Tolson	845	1971–72 1972–73 1973–74
5	Joe Kleine	806	1982–83 1983–84 1984–85
6	Moses Kingsley	768	2013–14 2014–15 2015–16 2016–17
7	Andrew Lang	690	1984–85 1985–86 1986–87 1987–88
8	Scott Hastings	680	1978–79 1979–80 1980–81 1981–82
9	Todd Day	673	1988–89 1989–90 1990–91 1991–92
10	Trevon Brazile	655	2022–23 2023–24 2024–25 2025–26

Season
Rk	Player	Rebounds	Season
1	Jaylin Williams	364	2021–22
2	Derek Hood	349	1998–99
3	Nick Davis	322	1997–98
4	Bobby Portis	321	2014–15
5	Dean Tolson	310	1972–73
6	Moses Kingsley	299	2015–16
7	Joe Kleine	294	1984–85
	Oliver Miller	294	1990–91
	Mike Washington	294	2008–09
10	Joe Kleine	293	1983–84
	Corliss Williamson	293	1994–95

Single game
Rk	Player	Rebounds	Season	Opponent
1	Nick Davis	23	1997–98	Jackson State
2	Dean Tolson	22	1971–72	TCU
	Dean Tolson	22	1972–73	Texas
	Dean Tolson	22	1972–73	Rice
5	Dean Tolson	21	1972–73	Rice
	Dean Tolson	21	1972–73	Southern Illinois
	Doug Campbell	21	1972–73	Rockhurst
8	John Talkington	20	1965–66	Texas
	Dean Tolson	20	1973–74	Rice
10	Dean Tolson	19	1972–73	Rice
	Dean Tolson	19	1973–74	Baylor
	Dean Tolson	19	1973–74	Texas
	Dean Tolson	19	1973–74	TCU

== Assists ==
Career
Rk	Player	Assists	Seasons
1	Kareem Reid	749	1995–96 1996–97 1997–98 1998–99
2	Lee Mayberry	729	1988–89 1989–90 1990–91 1991–92
3	Corey Beck	483	1992–93 1993–94 1994–95
4	Eric Ferguson	379	2002–03 2003–04 2004–05 2005–06
5	Rashad Madden	370	2011–12 2012–13 2013–14 2014–15
6	Ron Huery	351	1986–87 1987–88 1989–90 1990–91
7	Alvin Robertson	341	1981–82 1982–83 1983–84
8	Todd Day	319	1988–89 1989–90 1990–91 1991–92
9	Keith Wilson	303	1986–87 1987–88 1988–89
	Gary Ervin	303	2006–07 2007–08

Season
Rk	Player	Assists	Season
1	Darius Acuff Jr.	232	2025-26
2	Kareem Reid	219	1995–96
3	Lee Mayberry	209	1990–91
4	Corey Beck	207	1994–95
5	Jabril Durham	204	2015–16
6	Lee Mayberry	202	1991–92
7	Alvin Robertson	191	1983–84
8	Jalen Harris	189	2018–19
9	Lee Mayberry	183	1989–90
	Kareem Reid	183	1996–97

Single game
Rk	Player	Assists	Season	Opponent
1	Kareem Reid	15	1996–97	Jackson State
	Dontell Jefferson	15	2005–06	Portland State
3	Kareem Reid	14	1995–96	LSU
	Kareem Reid	14	1996–97	Troy
	Kareem Reid	14	1998–99	North Texas
6	Lee Mayberry	13	1990–91	Texas A&M
	Darius Acuff Jr.	13	2025–26	South Carolina
	Darius Acuff Jr.	13	2025–26	Texas
9	Keith Wilson	12	1988–89	Loyola Marymount
	Oliver Miller	12	1991–92	LSU
	Corey Beck	12	1994–95	Oklahoma
	Kareem Reid	12	1995–96	Florida
	Jabril Durham	12	2015–16	Mississippi State
	Jalen Harris	12	2018–19	Colorado State

== Steals ==
Career
Rk	Player	Steals	Seasons
1	Lee Mayberry	291	1988–89 1989–90 1990–91 1991–92
2	Todd Day	271	1988–89 1989–90 1990–91 1991–92
3	Kareem Reid	251	1995–96 1996–97 1997–98 1998–99
4	Darrell Walker	230	1980–81 1981–82 1982–83
5	Clint McDaniel	226	1991–92 1992–93 1993–94 1994–95
	TJ Cleveland	226	1998–99 1999–00 2000–01 2001–02
7	Alvin Robertson	217	1981–82 1982–83 1983–84
8	Ronnie Brewer	216	2003–04 2004–05 2005–06
9	Ron Huery	207	1986–87 1987–88 1989–90 1990–91
10	Keith Wilson	188	1986–87 1987–88 1988–89

Season
Rk	Player	Steals	Season
1	Clint McDaniel	102	1994–95
2	Lee Mayberry	100	1990–91
3	Keith Wilson	97	1988–89
4	Alvin Robertson	92	1983–84
5	Alvin Robertson	88	1982–83
6	Robert Shepherd	87	1992–93
7	Todd Day	85	1990–91
8	Darrell Walker	84	1982–83
9	Ronnie Brewer	83	2005–06
10	Todd Day	82	1989–90

Single game
Rk	Player	Steals	Season	Opponent
1	Robert Shepherd	9	1992–93	Arizona
2	Alvin Robertson	8	1982–83	Purdue
	Alvin Robertson	8	1983–84	Virginia
	Keith Wilson	8	1988–89	Rice
	Todd Day	8	1990–91	Texas A&M
	Darrell Hawkins	8	1992–93	Holy Cross
	Clint McDaniel	8	1994–95	Florida A&M
	JD Notae	8	2021–22	New Mexico State
9	Todd Day	7	1991–92	Vanderbilt
	TJ Cleveland	7	1999–00	LSU
	Ronnie Brewer	7	2004–05	Louisiana–Monroe
	JD Notae	7	2021–22	Mercer

== Blocks ==
Career
Rk	Player	Blocks	Seasons
1	Oliver Miller	345	1988–89 1989–90 1990–91 1991–92
2	Steven Hill	318	2004–05 2005–06 2006–07 2007–08
3	Moses Kingsley	256	2013–14 2014–15 2015–16 2016–17
4	Andrew Lang	252	1984–85 1985–86 1986–87 1987–88
5	Darian Townes	194	2004–05 2005–06 2006–07 2007–08
6	Daniel Gafford	141	2017–18 2018–19
7	Trevon Brazile	139	2022–23 2023–24 2024–25 2025–26
8	Nick Davis	130	1995–96 1996–97 1997–98
9	Larry Satchell	111	1999–00 2000–01 2001–02 2002–03
	Hunter Mickelson	111	2011–12 2012–13

Season
Rk	Player	Blocks	Season
1	Oliver Miller	112	1990–91
2	Steven Hill	99	2006–07
3	Moses Kingsley	93	2016–17
4	Steven Hill	91	2005–06
	Delvon Johnson	91	2010–11
6	Oliver Miller	88	1991–92
7	Andrew Lang	85	1986–87
	Oliver Miller	85	1989–90
9	Nick Davis	80	1997–98
10	Andrew Lang	79	1987–88

Single game
Rk	Player	Steals	Season	Opponent
1	Oliver Miller	10	1989–90	Texas
	Steven Hill	10	2005–06	Texas State
3	Oliver Miller	9	1990–91	Louisiana Tech
	Oliver Miller	9	1990–91	South Alabama
5	Andrew Lang	8	1986–87	Texas Tech
	Andrew Lang	8	1986–87	Rice
	Steven Hill	8	2005–06	UTPA
	Delvon Johnson	8	2010–11	Seton Hall
	Moses Kingsley	8	2015–16	Tennessee Tech
