= Martin Terry =

American basketball player

Personal information
- Listed height: 6 ft 4 in (1.93 m)
- Listed weight: 180 lb (82 kg)

Career information
- High school: Emporia (Emporia, Kansas)
- College: Hutchinson CC (1969–1971); Arkansas (1971–1973)
- NBA draft: 1973: 3rd round, 39th overall pick
- Drafted by: Chicago Bulls
- Position: Shooting guard

Career highlights
- SWC Player of the Year (1973); AP honorable mention All-American (1973); 2× First-team All-SWC (1972, 1973)
- Stats at Basketball Reference

Martin Terry is an American former basketball player known for his collegiate career at the University of Arkansas in the early 1970s. Terry currently holds the top two single season scoring averages, overall career scoring average, was a two-time All-Southwest Conference (SWC) First Team honoree, and was named the 1973 SWC Player of the Year.

A native of Emporia, Kansas, Terry attended Emporia High School before enrolling at Hutchinson Community College to play junior college basketball. He played for two seasons for the Blue Dragons before transferring to Arkansas in 1970–71. In Terry's time at Arkansas, he first averaged 24.3 points and 5.4 rebounds per game as a junior, then 28.3 points and 3.7 rebounds per game as a senior. In addition to holding the top two season and overall career scoring averages, Terry scored 30 or more points in 18 of 52 career games, including a then-school single game record of 47 against SMU on February 24, 1973. That season, Terry was named the SWC Player of the Year as well as an honorable mention All-American by the Associated Press. For his career he scored 1,368 points, which as of the end of the 2021–22 season is still the 17th highest mark in program history.

Following college, the Chicago Bulls selected Terry in the 1973 NBA draft in the third round (39th overall), though he never ended up playing in the NBA. He was also drafted by the Utah Stars of the ABA but did not appear in a game for them, either. Both teams already had deep rotations at the guard position, eliminating the gaps for which Terry's skill set would have provided value.
