= Mike Anderson (basketball, born 1959) =

American college basketball coach

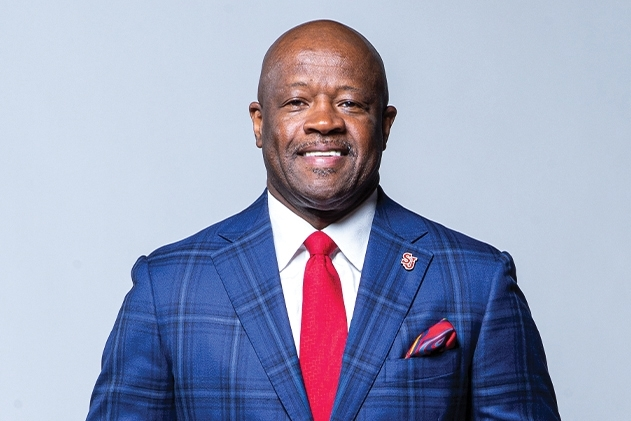
- Anderson during his tenure at St. John's

Biographical details
- Born: December 12, 1959 (age 66); Birmingham, Alabama, U.S.

Playing career
- 1978–1980: Jefferson State CC
- 1980–1982: Tulsa

Coaching career (HC unless noted)
- 1982–1985: Tulsa (assistant)
- 1985–2002: Arkansas (assistant)
- 2002: Arkansas (interim HC)
- 2002–2006: UAB
- 2006–2011: Missouri
- 2011–2019: Arkansas
- 2019–2023: St. John's

Head coaching record
- Overall: 438–257 (.630)
- Tournaments: 9–9 (NCAA Division I); 4–3 (NIT)

Accomplishments and honors

Championships
- C-USA regular season (2004); Big 12 tournament (2009)

Awards
- NABC Coach of the Year (2009); Clair Bee Coach of the Year Award (2009); C-USA Coach of the Year (2004); Big East Coach of the Year (2021)

Michael Andre Anderson (born December 12, 1959) is an American basketball coach, most recently the head coach of the St. John's Red Storm. He came to St. John's after previously serving as head coach at UAB, Missouri and Arkansas. He also served as an assistant/associate head coach under Nolan Richardson at Arkansas for 17 years. Over his 20 seasons as a head coach, Anderson has compiled a 414–235 record, 11 20-win campaigns, 9 NCAA Tournament appearances, two Sweet 16 berths and a run to the 2009 Elite Eight. Anderson is one of just 3 current Division I head coaches with 15+ years of experience and no losing seasons, along with Mark Few and Tom Izzo.

== Playing career ==
Anderson was born and raised in Birmingham, Alabama, where he attended Jackson-Olin High School in the Ensley-Pratt City neighborhood, leading the Mustangs to the semifinals of the Alabama state basketball tournament and averaging 19 points per game in his junior and senior years and winning all-state honors. Anderson moved on to Jefferson State Community College in Birmingham, where he was spotted by an opposing coach named Nolan Richardson. When Richardson was offered the coaching job at the University of Tulsa, he quickly offered Anderson a scholarship. In Anderson's two years with the Golden Hurricane he averaged 12 points a game, and the team won an NIT title and gained an NCAA tournament berth.

== Coaching career ==
=== Assistant positions ===
After graduating in 1982, Anderson went into substitute teaching while looking for a coaching job. Richardson brought him on to the University of Tulsa's staff as a volunteer assistant. When Richardson moved on to the University of Arkansas, he brought Anderson along as an assistant for a 17-year stint, the last five as assistant head coach. During that time, the Razorbacks won three Southwest Conference championships, two Southeastern Conference titles, three appearances in the Final Four, a national championship in 1994 and a second-place finish in 1995. When Richardson was fired, Anderson took over for the remainder of the 2001–02 season as interim head coach.

=== UAB ===
In 2002, Anderson returned to his hometown of Birmingham to take over the program at UAB, which was coming off a 13–17 season and had only one NCAA appearance since 1995. Anderson quickly turned the program around, leading the team to 22 wins and a National Invitation Tournament Quarterfinals appearance. Anderson then led the Blazers to three straight appearances in the NCAA men's basketball tournament. In 2004, the Blazers advanced to the Sweet Sixteen by virtue of a 76–75 upset victory over the University of Kentucky, the tournament's overall #1 seed. UAB ended the season ranked 23rd in the USA Today coaches' poll. Anderson was named Conference USA Coach of the Year, and is the only coach in UAB history to take the Blazers to the post season every year of his tenure.

=== Missouri ===
==== First two seasons (2006–2008) ====
Anderson was then hired in 2006 to take over the mess at the University of Missouri, rehabilitating a program that was under investigation under Quin Snyder. Anderson's first team, a collection of transfers and raw talent, went 18–12 but missed out on post-season play after a loss to Baylor in the Big 12 Tournament. His 2007–08 campaign saw the inclusion of his nephew DeMarre Carroll, a transfer from Vanderbilt, but also was hit by scandal, as a group of players (the "Athena Five", so named for where the incident took place) were arrested for a fight in a Columbia nightclub. That incident marked the second disciplinary issue of the season for Anderson's team. Before the season, starting forward Kalen Grimes had been dismissed from the team after being arrested for hitting a man with the butt of a shotgun. The Tigers finished 16–16, losing in the Big 12 Tourney to Nebraska and missing out on post-season play.

==== Third season (2008–09) ====
Anderson's third season at Mizzou in 2008–09 brought with it many questions: How well would he be able to blend his seven new players (five freshman and two transfers) with the remaining Tigers from the previous season including the only two remaining players from the Quin Snyder era? After failing to reach the post season his first two seasons would Mike Anderson be able to lead his Tigers to an NIT or NCAA post season tournament? Missouri was picked to finish 7th in the Big 12 by the coaches. The Tigers season got off to a great start with a 9–1 record including wins over USC and Cal and a close loss to a top 25 team (Xavier) in Puerto Rico. The Tigers finished their non-conference schedule with a record of 13–2. The team lost the conference opener but responded by winning eleven of their next twelve Big 12 games including a last-second win at Texas, which earned them a national ranking, and then a memorable win over their arch rival Kansas at home, where the Tigers climbed back from a 14-point halftime deficit to win the game after Zaire Taylor's game winning shot with 1.3 seconds remaining. Mike Anderson's 2008–09 Tiger team finished their last home game of the season by beating #5 Oklahoma on senior night. The Tigers went undefeated at home, winning 18 games. The Tigers then won the Big 12 Conference tournament by defeating Texas Tech, Oklahoma State and Baylor (Mar. 14) on successive nights. Victories over Cornell, Marquette and Memphis pushed the Tigers into the Elite 8, where top-seeded UConn ended Missouri's run with an 82–75 win.

Anderson was also one of ten finalists for the 2008–09 Henry Iba Award. The other 9 finalists were John Calipari, Memphis; Bill Self (eventual winner), Kansas; Jamie Dixon, Pittsburgh; Mike Montgomery, California; Stew Morrill, Utah State; Matt Painter, Purdue; Oliver Purnell, Clemson, and Brad Stevens, Butler.

On March 31, 2009, Anderson signed a 7-year extension at Missouri, passing up an offer from the University of Georgia. The extension increased Anderson's base salary to $1.6 million and up to $2.2 million with incentives. The offer Anderson reportedly turned down from Georgia was worth more than $2 million a year. Anderson also turned down a $3 million a year offer to coach the University of Oregon during the summer of 2010.

==== Final two seasons (2009–2011) ====
Anderson's teams went 23–11 and finished fifth in the conference in both of his final two seasons with Missouri. The Tigers made the NCAA tournament both years but never finished above third place in conference during his tenure. This three-year span was the first time the team had made three or more consecutive trips to the NCAA tournament since 2003. That same three-year span is the first time the Tigers had won more than 20 games three years in a row since 1980–1983.

==== Leaving Missouri ====
During the final month of Anderson's tenure at the University of Missouri, his name became linked with the Arkansas opening because of John Pelphrey's increasingly unstable job status. On March 4, 2011, Anderson dismissed the rumors, telling Columbia Tribune sportswriter Steve Walentik he planned to stay at MU for "a long time, retire here."

On March 14, Arkansas fired Pelphrey. Nine days later, Anderson accepted the head coaching position at Arkansas. The departure stunned Missouri fans, especially in light of Anderson's comments to the Tribune earlier in the month. According to MU guard Marcus Denmon, Anderson told him days before leaving that he would stay at MU and "didn't plan on changing." Anderson did not hold a press conference after accepting the Arkansas job, but Denmon, forward Laurence Bowers and guard Kim English—three players recruited to Missouri by Anderson—expressed both disappointment and understanding of Anderson's decision.

Later in the week, when Anderson held his introductory press conference at Arkansas, a reporter from KOMU traveled to Fayetteville to ask Anderson why he did not address fans or media in Columbia. Anderson denied that claim, citing a press release on Arkansas's official athletic website as the official "good-bye." Fans at the press conference booed the reporter, but Anderson told the crowd the questions were "legit," and that "Columbia was great to Mike Anderson."

Missouri eventually hired Frank Haith to succeed Anderson. In his first press conference, Haith said Anderson told him the new Missouri players would love him.

=== Arkansas ===
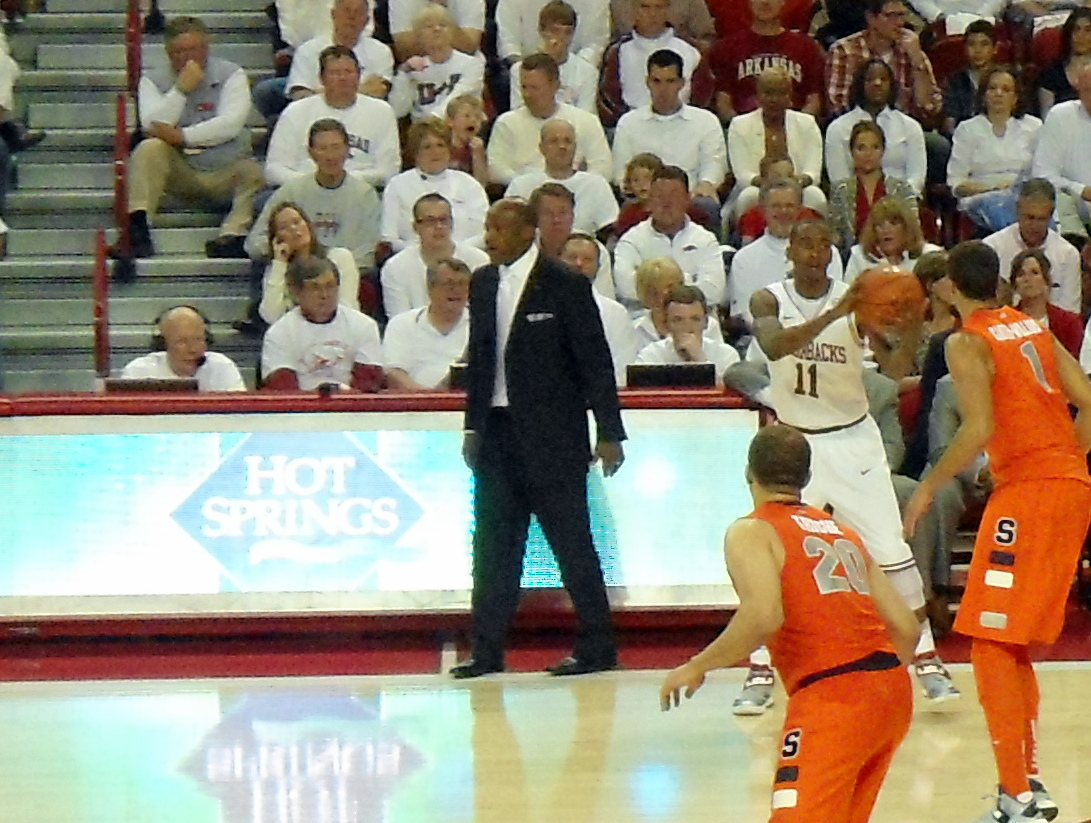
Anderson coaching the Razorbacks vs Syracuse, 2012

On March 23, 2011, Anderson signed a seven-year contract with the University of Arkansas worth $2.2 million a year. On April 6, 2011, the University of Arkansas announced Anderson's entire coaching staff, which included Melvin Watkins. T.J. Cleveland, and Matt Zimmerman, would follow him from Missouri.

==== First three seasons ====
Anderson meandered through his first two seasons back at the place he began his coaching career, finishing with winning records (18–14 and 19–13) but was unable to secure a spot in any postseason play, as they finished ninth and seventh in the Southeastern Conference standings.

In 2013–14, the Razorbacks returned to the postseason for the first time since 2008, earning a spot in the NIT. Improving its SEC Tournament seeding by two spots for the second straight year under Anderson, Arkansas finished fifth in the league standings at 10–8 while reaching the 20-win plateau (22–12) for the first time since the aforementioned 2007–08 campaign. Highlighting the 22-win season was the program's first-ever season sweep of SEC rival Kentucky and a 5–1 mark against teams that advanced to the Final Four of the NCAA Tournament and NIT. The Arkansas faithful saw signs of the Nolan Richardson-era style of play that Anderson utilizes, as the Razorbacks led the SEC in scoring (80.1), assists (15.3), steals (8.4), and turnover margin (+5.5), figures that all ranked in the top 30 in the nation. Individual development was also critical to Arkansas’ improvement in 2013–14, as 6'10" Bobby Portis became the sixth freshman in program history to earn All-SEC honors as a freshman, snagging a spot on the All-SEC second team, SEC All-Freshman squad and USBWA All-District VII team.

==== 2014–15 season ====
On January 6, 2015, it was announced that Anderson had signed a two-year contract extension, keeping him with Arkansas through 2020. Anderson led Arkansas to the NCAA tournament in his fourth season, while making it to the finals of the SEC tournament in the process. The Razorbacks were given a No. 5 seed, their highest seed in the tournament since 1999, when Anderson was still an assistant under Richardson. The Razorbacks advanced to the round of 32 before losing to North Carolina. Portis was named SEC Player of the Year, and was drafted with the 22nd pick by the Chicago Bulls in the 2015 NBA draft. Swingman Michael Qualls declared for the draft, but sustained an injury and wasn't selected, instead signing a free agent deal with the Oklahoma City Thunder and Rashad Madden signed a D-League contract with the Memphis Grizzlies.

==== 2015–16 season ====
On February 23, 2016, Anderson won his 100th game as the Arkansas coach and his 300th overall with an 85–65 victory over LSU. The Razorbacks finished the season 16–16, 9–9 in SEC play to finish in a tie for eighth place. They lost in the second round of the SEC tournament to Florida.

==== 2016–17 season ====
Anderson's sixth Razorback unit got off to the best start since he took over as coach. He signed three of the top six junior college players (Jaylen Barford, Daryl Macon, and Arlando Cook) in the off-season to load the Razorback roster up for a tournament run. With preseason SEC Player of the Year Moses Kingsley and sharpshooter Dusty Hannahs returning to lead the squad, the Razorbacks finished the regular season 23–8. Their 10–1 start bested his 9–2 starts in 2013–14 and 2014–15. The team won six SEC road games for only the third time in school history, joining the 1994 national champions and the 2015 team. They tied South Carolina for third in the league with a conference record of 12–6, and advanced to the finals of the SEC tournament, losing to Kentucky 82–65. The No. 8-seeded Razorbacks advanced to the NCAA tournament and defeated Seton Hall in their first game before falling to top-seeded and eventual national champion North Carolina in the second round, 72–65.

==== 2017–18 season ====
On January 26, 2018, it was announced that Anderson had signed another two-year contract extension, keeping him under contract until 2022. The Razorbacks finished in a tie for fourth in the SEC, which sent a record eight teams to the NCAA tournament. Butler ended their season in the first round, 79–62.

==== 2018–19 season ====
Anderson had to start over in his eighth season with the Razorbacks, welcoming nine new players with Daniel Gafford the only returning player of note. The team finished in a tie for ninth in the SEC with Alabama, lost its opening SEC Tournament game to Florida and then went 1–1 in the NIT to close out the year.

==== Termination ====
On March 26, 2019, it was announced that Arkansas had dismissed Anderson as head coach, marking the end of 25 years of association with the University of Arkansas as both an assistant and head basketball coach. He was replaced by former Nevada head coach Eric Musselman.

=== St. John's ===
The 59-year-old was named the head coach at St. John's University on April 19, 2019, replacing Chris Mullin.

On Feb. 16, 2021, Anderson won his 400th game as his Red Storm defeated Xavier. Anderson was named Big East Coach of the Year for the 2020–21 season. Anderson was given a 6-year extension as a result of his first two seasons at St. John's.

==== Termination ====
St. John’s fired Anderson on March 10, 2023, one day after his fourth season in charge ended with an overtime loss to No. 6 Marquette in the Big East Tournament quarterfinals.

==== Lawsuit ====
Anderson disputed the assertion that he was fired for cause and filed a notice of intent to arbitrate, seeking the guaranteed money that was owed to him under the terms of his contract as well as an additional $34.2 million in punitive damages, a total of $45.6 million. He alleges St. John's made the claim that it was firing him for cause in March 2023, only so the school could avoid paying his buyout and use the money to hire Rick Pitino, who was hired on March 20, 2023. The two parties settled in 2024.

== Head coaching record ==
Record table
Season	Team	Overall	Conference	Standing	Postseason
Arkansas Razorbacks (Southeastern Conference) (2002)
2001–02	Arkansas	1–1	1–0	T–4th (West)	
UAB Blazers (Conference USA) (2002–2006)
2002–03	UAB	21–13	8–8	T–2nd (National)	NIT Quarterfinal
2003–04	UAB	22–10	12–4	T–1st	NCAA Division I Sweet 16
2004–05	UAB	22–11	10–6	T–4th	NCAA Division I Round of 32
2005–06	UAB	24–7	12–2	2nd	NCAA Division I Round of 64
UAB:		89–41 (.685)	42–20 (.677)		
Missouri Tigers (Big 12 Conference) (2006–2011)
2006–07	Missouri	18–12	7–9	6th	
2007–08	Missouri	16–16	6–10	10th	
2008–09	Missouri	31–7	12–4	3rd	NCAA Division I Elite Eight
2009–10	Missouri	23–11	10–6	5th	NCAA Division I Round of 32
2010–11	Missouri	23–11	8–8	T–5th	NCAA Division I Round of 64
Missouri:		111–57 (.661)	43–37 (.538)		
Arkansas Razorbacks (Southeastern Conference) (2011–2019)
2011–12	Arkansas	18–14	6–10	9th	
2012–13	Arkansas	19–13	10–8	7th	
2013–14	Arkansas	22–12	10–8	5th	NIT Second Round
2014–15	Arkansas	27–9	13–5	2nd	NCAA Division I Round of 32
2015–16	Arkansas	16–16	9–9	T–8th	
2016–17	Arkansas	26–10	12–6	T–3rd	NCAA Division I Round of 32
2017–18	Arkansas	23–12	10–8	T–4th	NCAA Division I Round of 64
2018–19	Arkansas	18–16	8–10	T–9th	NIT Second Round
Arkansas:		170–103 (.623)	79–64 (.552)		
St. John's Red Storm (Big East Conference) (2019–2023)
2019–20	St. John's	17–15	5–13	T–8th	
2020–21	St. John's	16–11	10–9	T–4th	
2021–22	St. John's	17–15	8–11	T–7th	
2022–23	St. John's	18–15	7–13	8th	
St. John's:		68–56 (.548)	30–46 (.395)		
Total:		438–257 (.630)			
National champion Postseason invitational champion Conference regular season champion Conference regular season and conference tournament champion Division regular season champion Division regular season and conference tournament champion Conference tournament champion

== Personal life ==
Anderson and his wife, Marcheita, have four children: Darcheita, Michael Jr., Suney Alexander (Desmond Alexander) and Yvonne; and four grandchildren. Yvonne was a four-year letterwinner for the Texas Longhorns women's basketball team.

Anderson's nephew DeMarre Carroll was Missouri's leading scorer his senior year in 2008–09, played 11 seasons in the NBA and is currently an assistant coach in the league.
