= 2016–17 Florida Gators men's basketball team =

American college basketball season

2016–17 Florida Gators men's basketball

NCAA tournament, Elite Eight
- Conference: Southeastern Conference

Ranking
- Coaches: No. 10
- AP: No. 20
- Record: 27–9 (14–4 SEC)
- Head coach: Mike White (2nd season)
- Assistant coaches: Dusty May; Jordan Mincy; Darris Nichols
- Home arena: Exactech Arena at the Stephen C. O'Connell Center

2016–17 Southeastern Conference men's basketball standings
| | Conf. | | | | Overall |
| Team | W | | L | PCT | W | | L | PCT |
|---|---|---|---|---|---|---|---|---|
| No. 6 Kentucky † | 16 | – | 2 | .889 | 32 | – | 6 | .842 |
| No. 20 Florida | 14 | – | 4 | .778 | 27 | – | 9 | .750 |
| Arkansas | 12 | – | 6 | .667 | 26 | – | 10 | .722 |
| South Carolina | 12 | – | 6 | .667 | 26 | – | 11 | .703 |
| Ole Miss | 10 | – | 8 | .556 | 22 | – | 14 | .611 |
| Alabama | 10 | – | 8 | .556 | 19 | – | 15 | .559 |
| Vanderbilt | 10 | – | 8 | .556 | 19 | – | 16 | .543 |
| Georgia | 9 | – | 9 | .500 | 19 | – | 15 | .559 |
| Texas A&M | 8 | – | 10 | .444 | 16 | – | 15 | .516 |
| Tennessee | 8 | – | 10 | .444 | 16 | – | 16 | .500 |
| Auburn | 7 | – | 11 | .389 | 18 | – | 14 | .563 |
| Mississippi State | 6 | – | 12 | .333 | 16 | – | 16 | .500 |
| LSU | 2 | – | 16 | .111 | 10 | – | 21 | .323 |
| Missouri | 2 | – | 16 | .111 | 8 | – | 24 | .250 |
† 2017 SEC tournament winner Rankings from AP poll

The 2016–17 Florida Gators men's basketball team represented the University of Florida in the 2016–17 NCAA Division I men's basketball season. The Gators, led by second year head coach Mike White, competed in the Southeastern Conference (SEC) and played their home games at the Exactech Arena at the Stephen C. O'Connell Center on the university's Gainesville, Florida campus. They finished the season 27–9, 14–4 in SEC play to finish in second place. They lost in the quarterfinals of the SEC tournament to Vanderbilt, 72–62 in overtime. They received an at-large bid to the NCAA tournament where they defeated East Tennessee State, 80–65, in the first round, Virginia, 65–39, in the second round, and Wisconsin, 84–83 in overtime on a buzzer beater in the Sweet Sixteen before losing to fellow SEC member South Carolina, 77–70, in the Elite Eight, denying their first Final Four appearance since 2014.

== Previous season ==
The Gators finished the 2015–16 season 21–15, 9–9 in SEC play to finish in a tie for eighth place. They lost to Texas A&M in the quarterfinals of the SEC tournament. They received an invitation to the National Invitation Tournament, where they defeated North Florida and Ohio State to advance to the quarterfinals where they lost to George Washington.

== Offseason ==
=== Departures ===
| Name | Number | Pos. | Height | Weight | Year | Hometown | Notes |
|---|---|---|---|---|---|---|---|
| DeVon Walker | 1 | G/F | 6'6" | 203 | RS Junior | Winter Haven, FL | Graduate transferred to Troy |
| Brandone Francis | 2 | G | 6'5" | 205 | RS Freshman | La Romana, Dominican Republic | Transferred to Texas Tech |
| Alex Murphy | 5 | F | 6'8" | 225 | RS Senior | Wakefield, RI | Graduate transferred to Northeastern |
| Dorian Finney-Smith | 10 | F | 6'8" | 220 | RS Senior | Portsmouth, VA | Graduated |
| Zach Hodskins | 12 | G | 6'4" | 203 | Sophomore | Alpharetta, GA | Walk-on; didn't return |
| Lexx Edwards | 14 | G | 6'2" | 220 | RS Senior | Orlando, FL | Walk-on; graduated |
| Jhonny Victor | 20 | G | 6'4" | 178 | RS Freshman | Orlando, FL | Walk-on; didn't return |

=== Incoming transfers ===
| Name | Number | Pos. | Height | Weight | Year | Hometown | Previous School |
|---|---|---|---|---|---|---|---|
| Jalen Hudson | 3 | G | 6'5" | 195 | Junior | Akron, OH | Transferred from Virginia Tech. Under NCAA transfer rules, Hudson did not play for the 2016–17 season. Will have two years of remaining eligibility. |
| Canyon Barry | 24 | G | 6'6" | 205 | RS Senior | Colorado Springs, CO | Transferred from College of Charleston. Was eligible to play one season as a graduate transfer. |

=== 2016 recruiting class ===
College recruiting
| Name | Hometown | School | Height | Weight | Commit date |
|---|---|---|---|---|---|
| Gorjok Gak; No. 20 C | Bradenton, FL | Victory Rock Prep | 6 ft 11 in (2.11 m) | 215 lb (98 kg) | Apr 24, 2016 |
| Gorjok Gak; No. 20 C | Recruit ratings: Scout: Rivals: 247Sports: (79) | | | | |
| Eric Hester; No. 33 PG | Oldsmar, FL | Oldsmar Christian High School | 6 ft 3 in (1.91 m) | 175 lb (79 kg) | Aug 14, 2015 |
| Eric Hester; No. 33 PG | Recruit ratings: Scout: Rivals: 247Sports: (79) | | | | |
| Dontay Bassett; No. 63 PF | Oldsmar, FL | Oldsmar Christian High School | 6 ft 8 in (2.03 m) | 205 lb (93 kg) | Oct 12, 2015 |
| Dontay Bassett; No. 63 PF | Recruit ratings: Scout: Rivals: 247Sports: (72) | | | | |
Overall recruit ranking:
Note: In many cases, Scout, Rivals, 247Sports, On3, and ESPN may conflict in their listings of height and weight.; In these cases, the average was taken. ESPN grades are on a 100-point scale.; Sources: "2016 Florida Basketball Commits". Scout.; "Scout.com Team Recruiting Rankings". Scout.; "2016 Team Ranking". Rivals.

=== 2017 recruiting class ===
College recruiting (2017)
| Name | Hometown | School | Height | Weight | Commit date |
|---|---|---|---|---|---|
| DeAundre Ballard; SF | Southwest Atlanta Christian Academy | Atlanta, GA | 6 ft 6 in (1.98 m) | 170 lb (77 kg) | Apr 18, 2016 |
| DeAundre Ballard; SF | Recruit ratings: Scout: Rivals: 247Sports: (85) | | | | |
| Chase Johnson; PF | Ripley, WV | Huntington Prep | 6 ft 8 in (2.03 m) | 205 lb (93 kg) | Oct 3, 2016 |
| Chase Johnson; PF | Recruit ratings: Scout: Rivals: 247Sports: (80) | | | | |
| Isaiah Stokes; C | Memphis, TN | IMG Academy | 6 ft 8 in (2.03 m) | 285 lb (129 kg) | Nov 30, 2016 |
| Isaiah Stokes; C | Recruit ratings: Scout: Rivals: 247Sports: (85) | | | | |
| Mike Okauru; PG | Raleigh, NC | Brewster Academy | 6 ft 3 in (1.91 m) | 175 lb (79 kg) | Dec 22, 2016 |
| Mike Okauru; PG | Recruit ratings: Scout: Rivals: 247Sports: (79) | | | | |
Overall recruit ranking:
Note: In many cases, Scout, Rivals, 247Sports, On3, and ESPN may conflict in their listings of height and weight.; In these cases, the average was taken. ESPN grades are on a 100-point scale.; Sources: "2017 Florida Basketball Commits". Scout.; "Scout.com Team Recruiting Rankings". Scout.; "2017 Team Ranking". Rivals.

== Roster ==
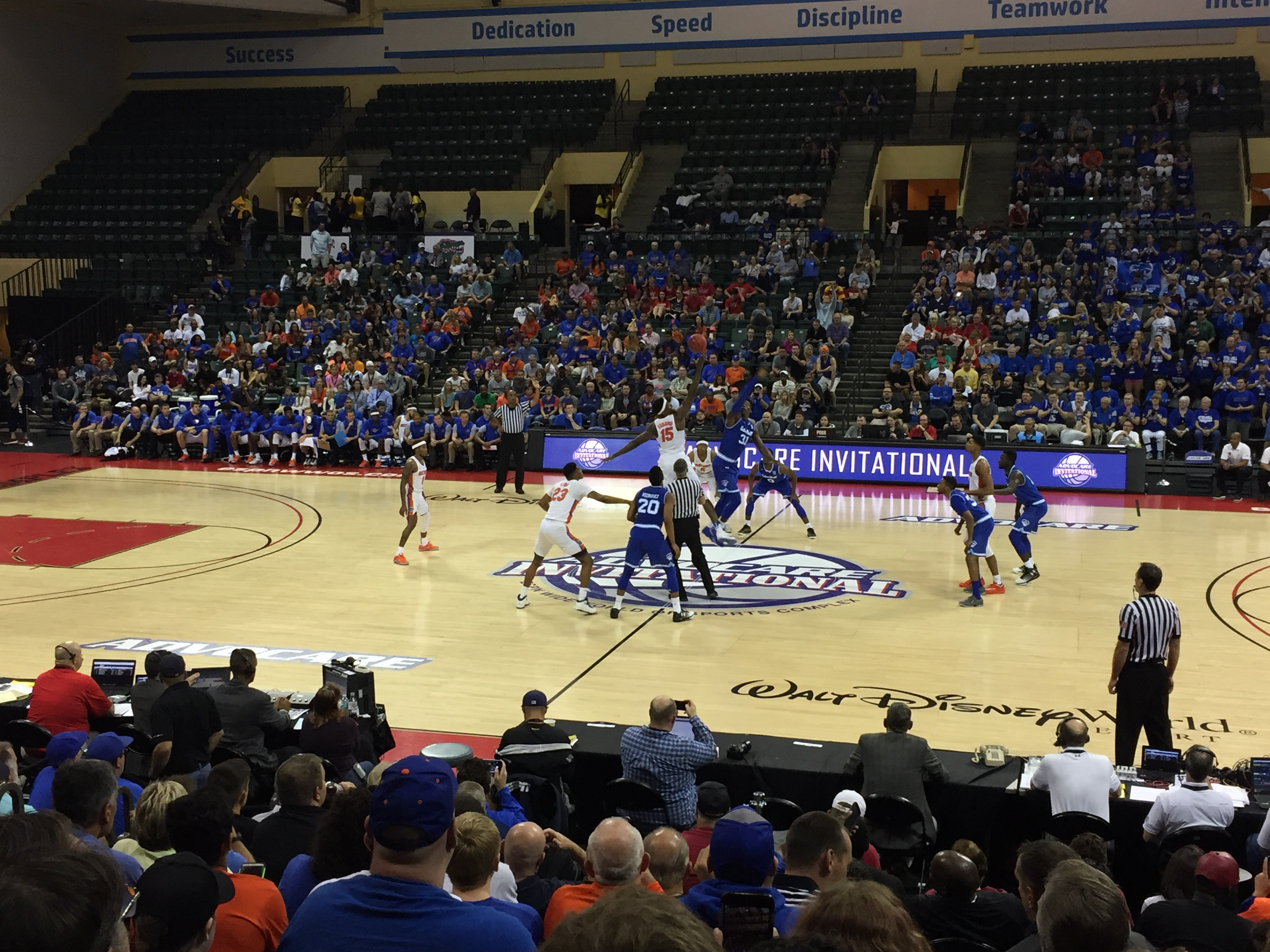
Tip off between the Florida Gators and the Seton Hall Pirates at the 2016 AdvoCare Invitational.

2016–17 Florida Gators men's basketball team
Players
Coaches

| Pos. | # | Name | Height | Weight | Year | Previous school | Hometown |
|---|---|---|---|---|---|---|---|
| G | 0 | Kasey Hill | 6 ft 1 in (1.85 m) | 175 lb (79 kg) | Sr | Montverde Academy | Umatilla, Florida |
| F | 1 | Devin Robinson | 6 ft 8 in (2.03 m) | 200 lb (91 kg) | Jr | Christchurch School | Chesterfield, Virginia |
| G | 2 | Eric Hester | 6 ft 3 in (1.91 m) | 167 lb (76 kg) | Fr | Oldsmar Christian School | Clearwater, Florida |
| G | 3 | Jalen Hudson (I) (redshirt) | 6 ft 6 in (1.98 m) | 190 lb (86 kg) | Jr | Virginia Tech | Richmond, Virginia |
| G | 5 | KeVaughn Allen | 6 ft 2 in (1.88 m) | 183 lb (83 kg) | So | North Little Rock High School | Little Rock, Arkansas |
| G | 11 | Chris Chiozza | 6 ft 0 in (1.83 m) | 176 lb (80 kg) | Jr | White Station High School | Memphis, Tennessee |
| F/C | 12 | Gorjok Gak | 6 ft 11 in (2.11 m) | 231 lb (105 kg) | Fr | Victory Rock Prep | Sydney, Australia |
| F/C | 13 | Kevarrius Hayes | 6 ft 9 in (2.06 m) | 218 lb (99 kg) | So | Suwannee High School | Live Oak, Florida |
| C | 15 | John Egbunu (injured) | 6 ft 11 in (2.11 m) | 255 lb (116 kg) | RS Jr | University of South Florida | Bauchi, Nigeria |
| F | 21 | Dontay Bassett | 6 ft 9 in (2.06 m) | 222 lb (101 kg) | Fr | Oldsmar Christian School | Oakland, California |
| F | 23 | Justin Leon | 6 ft 8 in (2.03 m) | 206 lb (93 kg) | Sr | Shawnee Community College | Conway, Arkansas |
| G | 24 | Canyon Barry | 6 ft 6 in (1.98 m) | 215 lb (98 kg) | GS | College of Charleston | Colorado Springs, Colorado |
| F | 25 | Keith Stone | 6 ft 8 in (2.03 m) | 240 lb (109 kg) | RS Fr | Zion Lutheran Christian School | Deerfield Beach, Florida |
| C | 32 | Schuyler Rimmer | 6 ft 10 in (2.08 m) | 249 lb (113 kg) | RS Sr | Stanford University | Orlando, Florida |

Head coach

- Mike White (Mississippi)

Assistant coach(es)

- Dusty May (Indiana)
- Jordan Mincy (Kent State)
- Darris Nichols (West Virginia)

Legend

- (C) Team captain
- (S) Suspended
- (I) Ineligible
- (W) Walk-on
- Injured
- Current redshirt

Roster

== Schedule and results ==
| Date time, TV | Rank^{#} | Opponent^{#} | Result | Record | High points | High rebounds | High assists | Site (attendance) city, state |
Exhibition
| October 26, 2016*; 7:00 pm | | vs. Eckerd | W 91–63 | – | 18 – Egbunu | 13 – Egbunu | 4 – Chiozza | Jacksonville Veterans Memorial Arena (1,122); Jacksonville, FL |
Regular season
| November 11, 2016*; 7:30 pm | | vs. Florida Gulf Coast | W 80–59 | 1–0 | 14 – Robinson | 8 – Egbunu | 4 – Tied | Jacksonville Veterans Memorial Arena (5,212); Jacksonville, FL |
| November 13, 2016*; 8:00 pm, ESPNU | | vs. Mercer | W 76–54 | 2–0 | 17 – Leon | 9 – Robinson | 5 – Allen | Jacksonville Veterans Memorial Arena (3,716); Jacksonville, FL |
| November 17, 2016*; 7:00 pm | | vs. St. Bonaventure; Lakeland Showcase | W 73–66 | 3–0 | 16 – Tied | 10 – Egbunu | 4 – Hill | Lakeland Center (4,133); Lakeland, FL |
| November 21, 2016*; 7:00 pm, SECN | | vs. Belmont; AdvoCare Invitational opening round | W 78–61 | 4–0 | 17 – Barry | 8 – Egbunu | 5 – Hill | Amalie Arena (6,650); Tampa, FL |
| November 24, 2016*; 8:30 pm, ESPN2 | | vs. Seton Hall; AdvoCare Invitational quarterfinals | W 81–76 | 5–0 | 21 – Allen | 10 – Egbunu | 2 – Tied | HP Field House (1,949); Lake Buena Vista, FL |
| November 25, 2016*; 9:30 pm, ESPNU | | vs. No. 11 Gonzaga; AdvoCare Invitational semifinals | L 72–77 | 5–1 | 18 – Robinson | 7 – Egbunu | 7 – Hill | HP Field House (2,941); Lake Buena Vista, FL |
| November 27, 2016*; 4:30 pm, ESPN2 | | vs. Miami (FL); AdvoCare Invitational 3rd place game | W 65–56 | 6–1 | 16 – Hill | 8 – Stone | 5 – Chiozza | HP Field House (2,305); Lake Buena Vista, FL |
| December 1, 2016*; 7:00 pm, ESPN3 | No. 24 | at North Florida | W 91–60 | 7–1 | 16 – Chiozza | 6 – Robinson | 9 – Chiozza | UNF Arena (4,113); Jacksonville, FL |
| December 6, 2016*; 9:00 pm, ESPN | No. 21 | vs. No. 5 Duke; Jimmy V Classic | L 74–84 | 7–2 | 21 – Allen | 12 – Egbunu | 6 – Hill | Madison Square Garden (15,294); New York City, NY |
| December 11, 2016*; 4:00 pm, ESPNU | No. 21 | at Florida State; Rivalry | L 78–83 | 7–3 | 21 – Hill | 7 – Hayes | 4 – Chiozza | Donald L. Tucker Center (10,029); Tallahassee, FL |
| December 17, 2016*; 4:00 pm, FS2 | | vs. Charlotte; Orange Bowl Basketball Classic | W 87–46 | 8–3 | 16 – Barry | 9 – Robinson | 5 – Hill | BB&T Center; Sunrise, FL |
| December 21, 2016*; 7:00 pm, SECN | | Little Rock | W 94–71 | 9–3 | 21 – Robinson | 8 – Hayes | 11 – Hill | O'Connell Center (10,655); Gainesville, FL |
| December 29, 2016; 7:00 pm, SECN | No. 25 | at Arkansas | W 81–72 | 10–3 (1–0) | 21 – Allen | 11 – Egbunu | 6 – Hill | Bud Walton Arena (16,035); Fayetteville, AR |
| January 3, 2017; 7:00 pm, ESPNU | No. 24 | Ole Miss | W 70–63 | 11–3 (2–0) | 20 – Barry | 5 – 4 tied | 5 – Hill | O'Connell Center (10,423); Gainesville, FL |
| January 7, 2017; 5:15 pm, ESPN2 | No. 24 | Tennessee | W 83–70 | 12–3 (3–0) | 23 – Allen | 6 – Leon | 7 – Hill | O'Connell Center (10,843); Gainesville, FL |
| January 10, 2017; 9:00 pm, ESPNU | No. 23 | at Alabama | W 80–67 | 13–3 (4–0) | 14 – Stone | 6 – Robinson | 4 – Hill | Coleman Coliseum (12,923); Tuscaloosa, AL |
| January 14, 2017; 2:00 pm, ESPN2 | No. 23 | Georgia | W 80–76 ^{OT} | 14–3 (5–0) | 27 – Barry | 11 – Egbunu | 4 – Tied | O'Connell Center (10,376); Gainesville, FL |
| January 18, 2017; 6:30 pm, SECN | No. 19 | at No. 24 South Carolina | L 53–57 | 14–4 (5–1) | 13 – Barry | 10 – Robinson | 4 – Chiozza | Colonial Life Arena (15,638); Columbia, SC |
| January 21, 2017; 12:00 pm, CBS | No. 19 | Vanderbilt | L 66–68 | 14–5 (5–2) | 29 – Allen | 6 – Tied | 7 – Hill | O'Connell Center (10,523); Gainesville, FL |
| January 25, 2017; 9:00 pm, SECN | No. 25 | at LSU | W 106–71 | 15–5 (6–2) | 24 – Robinson | 8 – Robinson | 10 – Chiozza | Maravich Center (7,009); Baton Rouge, LA |
| January 28, 2017*; 2:00 pm, ESPN | No. 25 | at Oklahoma; Big 12/SEC Challenge | W 84–52 | 16–5 (6–2) | 20 – Hayes | 9 – Hayes | 8 – Hill | Lloyd Noble Center (7,970); Norman, OK |
| February 2, 2017; 7:00 pm, ESPN2 | No. 24 | Missouri | W 93–54 | 17–5 (7–2) | 17 – Barry | 12 – Chiozza | 10 – Chiozza | O'Connell Center (10,153); Gainesville, FL |
| February 4, 2017; 8:15 pm, ESPN | No. 24 | No. 8 Kentucky; Rivalry, College GameDay | W 88–66 | 18–5 (8–2) | 21 – Hill | 9 – Tied | 9 – Chiozza | O'Connell Center (11,171); Gainesville, FL |
| February 7, 2017; 7:00 pm, ESPN2 | No. 17 | at Georgia | W 72–60 | 19–5 (9–2) | 15 – Chiozza | 7 – Leon | 5 – Hill | Stegeman Coliseum (7,605); Athens, GA |
| February 11, 2017; 12:00 pm, ESPN2 | No. 17 | Texas A&M | W 71–62 | 20–5 (10–2) | 18 – Leon | 10 – Egbunu | 5 – Tied | O'Connell Center (10,732); Gainesville, FL |
| February 14, 2017; 7:00 pm, SECN | No. 15 | at Auburn | W 114–95 | 21–5 (11–2) | 30 – Barry | 8 – Leon | 12 – Hill | Auburn Arena (7,572); Auburn, AL |
| February 18, 2017; 2:00 pm, ESPN | No. 15 | at Mississippi State | W 57–52 | 22–5 (12–2) | 14 – Chiozza | 10 – Tied | 2 – Tied | Humphrey Coliseum (7,980); Starkville, MS |
| February 21, 2017; 7:00 pm, ESPN | No. 13 | South Carolina | W 81–66 | 23–5 (13–2) | 26 – Allen | 7 – Allen | 4 – Chiozza | O'Connell Center (11,051); Gainesville, FL |
| February 25, 2017; 2:00 pm, CBS | No. 13 | at No. 11 Kentucky; Rivalry | L 66–76 | 23–6 (13–3) | 24 – Allen | 11 – Robinson | 5 – Chiozza | Rupp Arena (24,431); Lexington, KY |
| March 1, 2017; 7:00 pm, ESPN2 | No. 12 | Arkansas | W 78–65 | 24–6 (14–3) | 14 – Barry | 8 – Hayes | 4 – Hill | O'Connell Center (10,978); Gainesville, FL |
| March 4, 2017; 2:00 pm, ESPN | No. 12 | at Vanderbilt | L 71–73 | 24–7 (14–4) | 15 – Barry | 6 – Robinson | 4 – Chiozza | Memorial Gymnasium (10,431); Nashville, TN |
SEC Tournament
| March 10, 2017; 7:00 pm, SECN | (2) No. 17 | vs. (7) Vanderbilt; Quarterfinals | L 62–72 ^{OT} | 24–8 | 16 – Allen | 10 – Robinson | 2 – Hill | Bridgestone Arena (14,227); Nashville, TN |
NCAA tournament
| March 16, 2017; 3:10 pm, truTV | (4 E) No. 20 | vs. (13 E) East Tennessee State; First Round | W 80–65 | 25–8 | 24 – Robinson | 7 – Tied | 5 – Hill | Amway Center (15,037); Orlando, FL |
| March 18, 2017; 8:40 pm, TNT | (4 E) No. 20 | vs. (5 E) No. 24 Virginia; Second Round | W 65–39 | 26–8 | 14 – Robinson | 11 – Robinson | 5 – Chiozza | Amway Center (17,308); Orlando, FL |
| March 24, 2017; 9:59 pm, TBS | (4 E) No. 20 | vs. (8 E) No. 25 Wisconsin; Sweet Sixteen | W 84–83 ^{OT} | 27–8 | 35 – Allen | 8 – Leon | 5 – Chiozza | Madison Square Garden (20,047); New York City, NY |
| March 26, 2017; 2:20 pm, CBS | (4 E) No. 20 | vs. (7 E) South Carolina; Elite Eight | L 70–77 | 27–9 | 18 – Leon | 7 – Leon | 5 – Hill | Madison Square Garden (20,047); New York City, NY |
*Non-conference game. ^{#}Rankings from AP Poll. (#) Tournament seedings in parentheses. E=East Region. All times are in Eastern Time.

== Rankings ==
Ranking movements Legend: ██ Increase in ranking ██ Decrease in ranking RV = Received votes
| | Week | | | | | | | | | | | | | | | | | | | |
| Poll | Pre | 1 | 2 | 3 | 4 | 5 | 6 | 7 | 8 | 9 | 10 | 11 | 12 | 13 | 14 | 15 | 16 | 17 | 18 | Final |
|---|---|---|---|---|---|---|---|---|---|---|---|---|---|---|---|---|---|---|---|---|
| AP | RV | RV | RV | 24 | 21 | RV | RV | 25 | 24 | 23 | 19 | 25 | 24 | 17 | 15 | 13 | 12 | 17 | 20 | Not released |
| Coaches | RV | RV | RV | RV | 21 | RV | RV | RV | 24 | 23 | 19 | 25 | 23 | 17 | 13 | 12 | 12 | 13 | 17 | 10 |

*AP does not release post-NCAA tournament rankings

== See also ==
- 2016–17 Florida Gators women's basketball team
