= 2016–17 Arkansas Razorbacks men's basketball team =

American college basketball season

2016–17 Arkansas Razorbacks men's basketball

NCAA tournament, Second Round
- Conference: Southeastern Conference
- Record: 26–10 (12–6 SEC)
- Head coach: Mike Anderson (6th season)
- Associate head coach: Melvin Watkins
- Assistant coaches: T. J. Cleveland; Scotty Thurman
- Home arena: Bud Walton Arena

2016–17 Southeastern Conference men's basketball standings
	Conf.				Overall
Team	W		L	PCT	W		L	PCT
No. 6 Kentucky †	16	–	2	.889	32	–	6	.842
No. 20 Florida	14	–	4	.778	27	–	9	.750
Arkansas	12	–	6	.667	26	–	10	.722
South Carolina	12	–	6	.667	26	–	11	.703
Ole Miss	10	–	8	.556	22	–	14	.611
Alabama	10	–	8	.556	19	–	15	.559
Vanderbilt	10	–	8	.556	19	–	16	.543
Georgia	9	–	9	.500	19	–	15	.559
Texas A&M	8	–	10	.444	16	–	15	.516
Tennessee	8	–	10	.444	16	–	16	.500
Auburn	7	–	11	.389	18	–	14	.563
Mississippi State	6	–	12	.333	16	–	16	.500
LSU	2	–	16	.111	10	–	21	.323
Missouri	2	–	16	.111	8	–	24	.250
† 2017 SEC tournament winner Rankings from AP poll

The 2016–17 Arkansas Razorbacks men's basketball team represented the University of Arkansas during the 2016–17 NCAA Division I men's basketball season. The team was led by sixth-year head coach Mike Anderson, and played their home games at Bud Walton Arena in Fayetteville, Arkansas as a member of the SEC.

== Previous season ==
Arkansas did not continue the momentum it had built in 2014–15, after finishing second to Kentucky in the SEC and winning a game in the NCAA tournament for the first time in seven years. They lost Chicago Bulls forward Bobby Portis to the NBA and Michael Qualls also declared but was not drafted after sustaining a knee injury. Seniors Rashad Madden and Alandise Harris graduated, and Nick Babb elected to transfer to Iowa State.

In the offseason, returning players Jacorey Williams and Anton Beard, along with Colorado transfer Dustin Thomas, were involved in a counterfeiting scandal and Williams was later kicked off the team. Beard was suspended for the first semester and Thomas had to sit out the season anyway as part of NCAA transfer rules.

The Razorbacks lost to Florida in the second round of the SEC tournament.

== Departures ==
Name	Number	Pos.	Height	Weight	Year	Hometown	Notes
Jabril Durham	4	G	6'1"	185	Senior	DeSoto, Texas	Graduated
Anthlon Bell	5	G	6'3"	185	Senior	Bartlett, Tennessee	Graduated
Lorenzo Jenkins	15	G	6'7"	210	Freshman	Naples, Florida	Transferred
Jimmy Whitt	24	G	6'4"	173	Freshman	Columbia, Missouri	Transferred
Willy Kouassi	50	F	6'10"	230	RS Senior	Abidjan, Ivory Coast	Graduated
Keaton Miles	55	F	6'7"	212	RS Senior	Dallas, Texas	Graduated

== Recruiting classes ==
=== 2016 ===
College recruiting
Name	Hometown	School	Height	Weight	Commit date
Arlando Cook; F	St. Louis, Missouri	Connors State College	6 ft 8 in (2.03 m)	215 lb (98 kg)	Nov 5, 2015
Arlando Cook; F	Recruit ratings: Scout: Rivals: 247Sports: ESPN:				
Adrio Bailey; F	Campti, Louisiana	Lakeview High School	6 ft 6 in (1.98 m)	210 lb (95 kg)	Oct 18, 2015
Adrio Bailey; F	Recruit ratings: Scout: Rivals: 247Sports: ESPN:				
Jaylen Barford; G	Jackson, Tennessee	Motlow State Community College	6 ft 3 in (1.91 m)	205 lb (93 kg)	Sep 22, 2015
Jaylen Barford; G	Recruit ratings: Scout: Rivals: 247Sports: ESPN:				
Daryl Macon; G	Little Rock, Arkansas	Holmes Community College	6 ft 3 in (1.91 m)	185 lb (84 kg)	Jun 6, 2015
Daryl Macon; G	Recruit ratings: Scout: Rivals: 247Sports: ESPN:				
C.J. Jones; G	Birmingham, Alabama	Central Park Christian High School	6 ft 5 in (1.96 m)	185 lb (84 kg)	Feb 20, 2016
C.J. Jones; G	Recruit ratings: Scout: Rivals: 247Sports: ESPN:				
Brachen Hazen; F	Columbia City, Indiana	Columbia City High School	6 ft 8 in (2.03 m)	200 lb (91 kg)	Apr 26, 2016
Brachen Hazen; F	Recruit ratings: Scout: Rivals: 247Sports: ESPN:				
Overall recruit ranking:
Note: In many cases, Scout, Rivals, 247Sports, On3, and ESPN may conflict in their listings of height and weight.; In these cases, the average was taken. ESPN grades are on a 100-point scale.; Sources: "ESPN". ESPN.; "2016 Team Ranking". Rivals.

=== 2017 ===
College recruiting (2017)
Name	Hometown	School	Height	Weight	Commit date
Daniel Gafford; F	El Dorado, Arkansas	El Dorado High School	6 ft 11 in (2.11 m)	225 lb (102 kg)	Aug 1, 2015
Daniel Gafford; F	Recruit ratings: Scout: Rivals: 247Sports: ESPN:				
Khalil Garland; G	Little Rock, Arkansas	Parkview High School	6 ft 6 in (1.98 m)	195 lb (88 kg)	Jul 16, 2016
Khalil Garland; G	Recruit ratings: Scout: Rivals: 247Sports: ESPN:				
Darious Hall; F	Little Rock, Arkansas	Mills University Studies High School	6 ft 7 in (2.01 m)	215 lb (98 kg)	Mar 15, 2016
Darious Hall; F	Recruit ratings: Scout: Rivals: 247Sports: ESPN: {{College Athlete Recruit Entry recruit = Gabe Osabuohien position = Forward (basketball) hometown = Toronto, Ontario, Canada; Little Rock, Arkansas high school = Southwest Christian Academy feet = 6 inches = 8 weight = 219 commit date = 05/24/2017 scout stars = 0 rivals stars = 0 246 stars = 3 espn stars = 0 }}				
Overall recruit ranking:
Note: In many cases, Scout, Rivals, 247Sports, On3, and ESPN may conflict in their listings of height and weight.; In these cases, the average was taken. ESPN grades are on a 100-point scale.; Sources: "ESPN". ESPN.; "2017 Team Ranking". Rivals.

== Roster ==
2016–17 Arkansas Razorbacks men's basketball team
Players
Coaches

Pos.	#	Name	Height	Weight	Year	Previous school	Hometown
G	0	Jaylen Barford	6 ft 3 in (1.91 m)	202 lb (92 kg)	Jr	South Side HS; Motlow State CC	Jackson, Tennessee
PF	1	Trey Thompson	6 ft 9 in (2.06 m)	265 lb (120 kg)	Jr	Forrest City HS	Madison, Arkansas
SF	2	Adrio Bailey	6 ft 6 in (1.98 m)	204 lb (93 kg)	Fr	Lakeview HS	Campti, Louisiana
SG	3	Dusty Hannahs	6 ft 3 in (1.91 m)	210 lb (95 kg)	RS Sr	Pulaski Academy; Texas Tech	Little Rock, Arkansas
SG	4	Daryl Macon	6 ft 3 in (1.91 m)	185 lb (84 kg)	Jr	Parkview HS; Holmes CC	Little Rock, Arkansas
PF	5	Arlando Cook	6 ft 8 in (2.03 m)	210 lb (95 kg)	Jr	Madison Prep; Connors State College	St. Louis, Missouri
PG	11	RJ Glasper	5 ft 10 in (1.78 m)	168 lb (76 kg)	Fr	Forrest City HS	Forrest City, Arkansas
SF	12	Brachen Hazen	6 ft 8 in (2.03 m)	195 lb (88 kg)	Fr	Columbia City HS	Fort Wayne, Indiana
PF	13	Dustin Thomas	6 ft 8 in (2.03 m)	225 lb (102 kg)	RS Jr	Pleasant Grove HS; Colorado	Texarkana, Texas
SG	21	Manuale Watkins	6 ft 3 in (1.91 m)	222 lb (101 kg)	Sr	Fayetteville HS	Fayetteville, Arkansas
SG	23	C.J. Jones	6 ft 5 in (1.96 m)	175 lb (79 kg)	Fr	Central Park Christian HS	Birmingham, Alabama
PG	31	Anton Beard	6 ft 0 in (1.83 m)	198 lb (90 kg)	Jr	North Little Rock HS	North Little Rock, Arkansas
C	33	Moses Kingsley	6 ft 10 in (2.08 m)	230 lb (104 kg)	Sr	Huntington Prep	Abuja, Nigeria

Head coach

- Mike Anderson (Tulsa)

Assistant coach(es)

- Melvin Watkins (Charlotte)
- T. J. Cleveland (Arkansas)
- Scotty Thurman (Arkansas)

Legend

- (C) Team captain
- (S) Suspended
- (I) Ineligible
- (W) Walk-on
- Injured
- Current redshirt

Roster
Last update: 2016-10-24

== Schedule ==
Date time, TV	Rank^{#}	Opponent^{#}	Result	Record	Site (attendance) city, state
Spanish exhibition tour
Aug 9, 2016*; 8:00 pm		at Eurocolegio Casvi	L 75–81		Madrid, Spain
Aug 10, 2016*; 5:30 am		at Albacete Basket (LEB Plata)	W 96–61		Pabellón del Parque; Albacete, Spain
Aug 13, 2016*; 9:00 pm		at Barcelona All-Stars	W 99–77		Barcelona, Spain
Aug 14, 2016*; 8:00 pm		at Europe Basketball Academy	W 124–55		Barcelona, Spain
Exhibition
10/28/2016*; 4:00 pm		Central Missouri	W 87–60		Bud Walton Arena (13,293); Fayetteville, AR
11/04/2016*; 7:00 pm		Emporia State	W 94–44		Bud Walton Arena (13,279); Fayetteville, AR
Regular season
11/11/2016*; 7:00 pm		Fort Wayne	W 92–83	1–0	Bud Walton Arena (13,787); Fayetteville, AR
11/14/2016*; 7:00 pm		Southern Illinois; Golden Gopher Showcase	W 90–65	2–0	Bud Walton Arena (13,308); Fayetteville, AR
11/18/2016*; 7:00 pm		Texas–Arlington; Golden Gopher Showcase	W 71–67	3–0	Bud Walton Arena (13,587); Fayetteville, AR
11/22/2016*; 7:00 pm, ESPN3		at Minnesota; Golden Gopher Showcase	L 71–85	3–1	Williams Arena (8,997); Minneapolis, MN
11/28/2016*; 7:00 pm		Mount St. Mary's; Golden Gopher Showcase	W 89–76	4–1	Bud Walton Arena (13,321); Fayetteville, AR
12/01/2016*; 8:00 pm, SECN		Stephen F. Austin	W 78–62	5–1	Bud Walton Arena (13,358); Fayetteville, AR
12/03/2016*; 7:00 pm		Austin Peay	W 99–62	6–1	Bud Walton Arena (19,483); Fayetteville, AR
12/06/2016*; 6:00 pm, SECN		Houston	W 84–72	7–1	Bud Walton Arena (13,455); Fayetteville, AR
12/10/2016*; 4:30 pm, SECN		North Florida	W 91–76	8–1	Bud Walton Arena (13,700); Fayetteville, AR
12/17/2016*; 1:30 pm, ESPNU		vs. Texas; Houston Showcase	W 77–74	9–1	Toyota Center (8,777); Houston, TX
12/20/2016*; 7:00 pm		North Dakota State	W 71–55	10–1	Bud Walton Arena (16,006); Fayetteville, AR
12/22/2016*; 6:00 pm, SECN		vs. Sam Houston State	W 90–56	11–1	Verizon Arena (12,153); North Little Rock, AR
12/29/2016; 8:00 pm, SECN		No. 25 Florida	L 72–81	11–2 (0–1)	Bud Walton Arena (16,035); Fayetteville, AR
01/03/2017; 5:30 pm, SECN		at Tennessee	W 82–78	12–2 (1–1)	Thompson-Boling Arena (13,002); Knoxville, TN
01/07/2017; 7:30 pm, ESPN		at No. 6 Kentucky	L 71–97	12–3 (1–2)	Rupp Arena (24,332); Lexington, KY
01/10/2017; 8:00 pm, SECN		Mississippi State	L 78–84	12–4 (1–3)	Bud Walton Arena (15,111); Fayetteville, AR
01/14/2017; 5:00 pm, SECN		Missouri	W 92–73	13–4 (2–3)	Bud Walton Arena (15,424); Fayetteville, AR
01/17/2017; 6:00 pm, SECN		at Texas A&M	W 62–60	14–4 (3–3)	Reed Arena (9,474); College Station, TX
01/21/2017; 7:30 pm, SECN		LSU	W 99–86	15–4 (4–3)	Bud Walton Arena (16,099); Fayetteville, AR
01/24/2017; 7:30 pm, SECN		at Vanderbilt	W 71–70	16–4 (5–3)	Memorial Gymnasium (9,408); Nashville, TN
01/28/2017*; 3:00 pm, ESPNU		at Oklahoma State; Big 12/SEC Challenge	L 71–99	16–5	Gallagher-Iba Arena (13,611); Stilwatter, OK
02/01/2017; 6:00 pm, SECN		Alabama	W 87–68	17–5 (6–3)	Bud Walton Arena (14,004); Fayetteville, AR
02/04/2017; 5:00 pm, SECN		at Missouri	L 78–83	17–6 (6–4)	Mizzou Arena (8,211); Columbia, MO
02/07/2017; 7:30 pm, SECN		Vanderbilt	L 59–72	17–7 (6–5)	Bud Walton Arena (13,494); Fayetteville, AR
02/11/2017; 7:30 pm, SECN		at LSU	W 78–70	18–7 (7–5)	Pete Maravich Assembly Center (7,132); Baton Rouge, LA
02/15/2017; 5:30 pm, SECN		at No. 21 South Carolina	W 83–76	19–7 (8–5)	Colonial Life Arena (13,001); Columbia, SC
02/18/2017; 5:00 pm, SECN		Ole Miss	W 98–80	20–7 (9–5)	Bud Walton Arena (17,356); Fayetteville, AR
02/22/2017; 7:30 pm, SECN		Texas A&M	W 86–77	21–7 (10–5)	Bud Walton Arena (14,117); Fayetteville, AR
02/25/2017; 7:30 pm, SECN		at Auburn	W 79–68	22–7 (11–5)	Auburn Arena (8,098); Auburn, AL
03/01/2017; 6:00 pm, ESPN2		at No. 12 Florida	L 65–78	22–8 (11–6)	O'Connell Center (10,978); Gainesville, FL
03/04/2017; 1:00 pm, ESPN2		Georgia	W 85–67	23–8 (12–6)	Bud Walton Arena (18,247); Fayetteville, AR
SEC Tournament
03/10/2017; 8:30 pm, SECN	(3)	vs. (6) Ole Miss; Quarterfinals	W 73–72	24–8	Bridgestone Arena (14,227); Nashville, TN
03/11/2017; 2:30 pm, ESPN	(3)	vs. (7) Vanderbilt; Semifinals	W 76–62	25–8	Bridgestone Arena (19,196); Nashville, TN
03/12/2017; 12:00 pm, ESPN	(3)	vs. (1) No. 8 Kentucky; Championship	L 65–82	25–9	Bridgestone Arena (19,953); Nashville, TN
NCAA tournament
03/17/2017*; 12:30 pm, TNT	(8 S)	vs. (9 S) Seton Hall; First Round	W 77–71	26–9	Bon Secours Wellness Arena (14,179); Greenville, South Carolina
03/19/2017*; 5:10 pm, TNT	(8 S)	vs. (1 S) No. 5 North Carolina; Second Round	L 65–72	26–10	Bon Secours Wellness Arena (14,216); Greenville, South Carolina
*Non-conference game. ^{#}Rankings from AP Poll. (#) Tournament seedings in parentheses. All times are in Central Time.
