= Sindarius Thornwell =

American basketball player (born 1994)

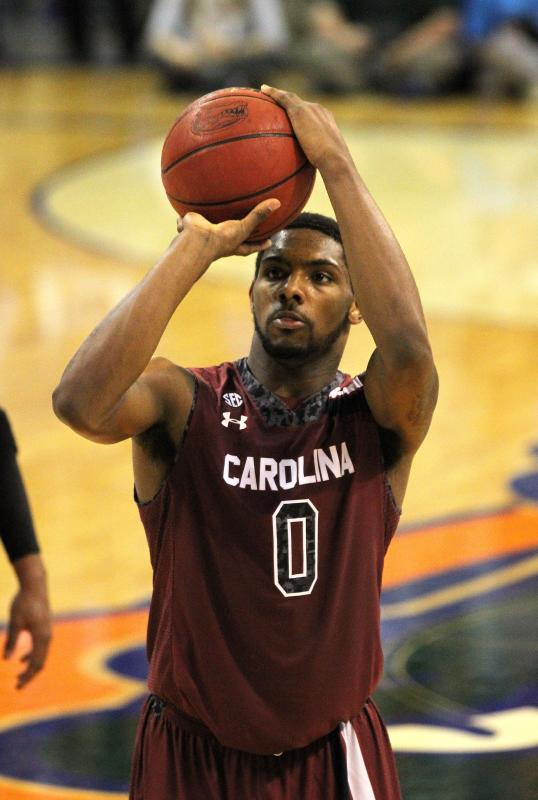
- Thornwell with South Carolina in 2014

No. 3 – Dorados de Chihuahua
- Position: Shooting guard
- League: LNBP

Personal information
- Born: November 15, 1994 (age 32) Lancaster, South Carolina, U.S.
- Listed height: 6 ft 4 in (1.93 m)
- Listed weight: 215 lb (98 kg)

Career information
- High school: Lancaster (Lancaster, South Carolina); Oak Hill Academy (Mouth of Wilson, Virginia)
- College: South Carolina (2013–2017)
- NBA draft: 2017: 2nd round, 48th overall pick
- Drafted by: Milwaukee Bucks
- Playing career: 2017–present

Career history
- 2017–2019: Los Angeles Clippers
- 2018–2019: →Agua Caliente Clippers
- 2019–2020: Rio Grande Valley Vipers
- 2020–2021: New Orleans Pelicans
- 2021: Orlando Magic
- 2021–2022: ratiopharm Ulm
- 2022: Frutti Extra Bursaspor
- 2023–2024: Avtodor
- 2024–2025: Zastal Zielona Góra
- 2025: Xinjiang Flying Tigers
- 2026: Astros de Jalisco
- 2026–present: Dorados de Chihuahua

Career highlights
- SEC Player of the Year – Coaches (2017); First-team All-SEC (2017); SEC All-Freshman team (2014)
- Stats at NBA.com
- Stats at Basketball Reference

Sindarius Dyquann Thornwell (born November 15, 1994) is an American professional basketball player for the Dorados de Chihuahua of the Liga Nacional de Baloncesto Profesional (LNBP). He played college basketball for the South Carolina Gamecocks. Thornwell was selected by the Milwaukee Bucks with the 48th overall pick in the 2017 NBA draft before he was traded to the Los Angeles Clippers.

== High school career ==
Thornwell attended Lancaster High School in Lancaster, South Carolina for his first three years of high school. He then transferred to Oak Hill Academy for his senior year where he averaged 26.8 points per game and averaged 8.6 rebounds and 3.6 assists as well. He led them to a 33–5 record. He was ranked as the 39th-best player by ESPN.com and a four-star recruit by Rivals.com, who also ranked him as the 11th-best shooting guard in his class. He also competed in the 2012 Nike Global Challenge playing in four games.

College recruiting
Name	Hometown	School	Height	Weight	Commit date
Sindarius Thornwell; Guard	Lancaster, South Carolina	Oak Hill Academy	6 ft 5 in (1.96 m)	205 lb (93 kg)	Oct 2, 2012
Sindarius Thornwell; Guard	Recruit ratings: Scout: Rivals: 247Sports: ESPN: (92)				

== College career ==
After committing to South Carolina on October 2, 2012, Thornwell was second on the South Carolina basketball team in scoring with 13.4 ppg and 4.0 rebounds per game. He also averaged 3.0 assists per game. During conference play, he was averaging 15.0 ppg as well. On January 22, 2014, Thornwell had a career-high 26 points against the University of Georgia. As a result of his production that season, Thornwell was named a member of the All-SEC Freshman Team.

His sophomore year in the 2014–15 season was not as productive as his freshman season.

His junior year, on the other hand, would provide relatively similar results to what he had in his freshman year.

However, it would be his senior season where Thornwell would come into his own as a player, as Thornwell would average 21.4 points, 7.2 rebounds and 2.2 steals in 34.2 minutes of action per game. As a result of his production that season, he was not only a member of the All-SEC First Team, but he was also named the SEC Player of the Year thanks to votes from the coaches of the Southeastern Conference. Furthermore, Thornwell would be the main leader to help the No. 7 seeded South Carolina proceed all the way to the Final Four in the 2017 NCAA tournament, which was the highest results in South Carolina's history.

== Professional career ==
=== Los Angeles Clippers (2017–2019) ===
On June 22, 2017, Thornwell was selected with the 48th pick in the 2017 NBA draft by the Milwaukee Bucks, but his draft rights were then traded to the Los Angeles Clippers. Thornwell signed with the Clippers on July 26.

=== Rio Grande Valley Vipers (2019–2020) ===
On August 4, 2019, Thornwell signed with the Cleveland Cavaliers and played in three preseason games before he was waived on October 16.

On October 26, 2019, the Canton Charge traded Thornwell to the Rio Grande Valley Vipers for a first-round G-League pick in 2020. Thornwell averaged 9.2 points, 5.2 rebounds and 4.6 assists per game on 42.9 percent shooting in the 2019–20 season.

=== New Orleans Pelicans (2020–2021) ===
On July 6, 2020, Thornwell was signed by the New Orleans Pelicans as a substitute player for the remainder of the 2019–20 season. On December 1, he re-signed with the Pelicans.

After waiving Thornwell on February 23, 2021, the Pelicans signed him to a 10-day contract the next day. On March 10, he was signed to a second 10-day contract.

=== Orlando Magic (2021) ===
On May 4, 2021, Thornwell signed a two-way contract with the Orlando Magic. He averaged 3.4 points, 1.9 rebounds, 2.4 assists, and 1.1 steals per game in seven games played.

=== ratiopharm Ulm (2021–2022) ===
On November 11, 2021, Thornwell signed with ratiopharm Ulm of the German Basketball Bundesliga.

Thornwell joined the Chicago Bulls for the 2022 NBA Summer League.

=== Frutti Extra Bursaspor (2022) ===
On October 19, 2022, Thornwell has signed with Frutti Extra Bursaspor of the Turkish Basketbol Süper Ligi (BSL).

=== Zastal Zielona Góra (2024–2025) ===
On August 23, 2024, Thornwell signed with Zastal Zielona Góra of the Polish Basketball League (PLK). On February 8, 2025, he parted ways with the team.

=== Xinjiang Flying Tigers (2025) ===
On February 11, 2025, Thornwell joined the Xinjiang Flying Tigers of the Chinese Basketball Association.

== Career statistics ==
Legend
GP	Games played	GS	Games started	MPG	Minutes per game
FG%	Field goal percentage	3P%	3-point field goal percentage	FT%	Free throw percentage
RPG	Rebounds per game	APG	Assists per game	SPG	Steals per game
BPG	Blocks per game	PPG	Points per game	**Bold**	Career high

=== NBA ===
==== Regular season ====
Year	Team	GP	GS	MPG	FG%	3P%	FT%	RPG	APG	SPG	BPG	PPG
2017–18	L.A. Clippers	**73**	**17**	15.8	.429	.377	.670	1.9	.9	.7	.3	3.9
2018–19	L.A. Clippers	64	1	4.9	.347	.200	**.735**	.7	.3	.2	.1	1.0
2019–20	New Orleans	2	0	17.5	**.545**	**.500**	.500	2.0	**2.0**	.5	**.5**	**8.0**
2020–21	New Orleans	14	1	5.2	.333	.333	.000	.4	.3	.4	.1	1.2
2020–21	Orlando	7	0	**20.6**	.320	.286	.667	1.9	**2.4**	**1.1**	.1	3.4
Career		160	19	10.8	.407	.340	.672	1.3	.7	.5	.2	2.5

==== Playoffs ====
Year	Team	GP	GS	MPG	FG%	3P%	FT%	RPG	APG	SPG	BPG	PPG
2019	L.A. Clippers	4	0	3.0	.333	.333	—	1.0	.0	.3	.0	1.3
Career		4	0	3.0	.333	.333	—	1.0	.0	.3	.0	1.3

=== College ===
Year	Team	GP	GS	MPG	FG%	3P%	FT%	RPG	APG	SPG	BPG	PPG
2013–14	South Carolina	**34**	**34**	29.6	.386	.370	.736	4.1	3.0	1.2	.6	13.4
2014–15	South Carolina	33	33	30.6	.340	.268	.716	4.9	2.2	1.3	.3	11.1
2015–16	South Carolina	**34**	**34**	33.1	.382	.333	.764	4.8	**3.8**	1.5	.5	13.4
2016–17	South Carolina	31	31	**33.9**	**.444**	**.392**	**.830**	**7.1**	2.8	**2.1**	**1.0**	**21.4**
Career		132	132	31.8	.392	.339	.771	5.2	3.0	1.5	.6	14.7

== Personal life ==
On September 2, 2025, Thornwell was arrested on a domestic violence charge in Richland County.
