= 2016–17 South Carolina Gamecocks men's basketball team =

American college basketball season

2016–17 South Carolina Gamecocks men's basketball

Brooklyn Hoops Holiday Invitational champions

NCAA tournament, Final Four
- Conference: Southeastern Conference

Ranking
- Coaches: No. 6
- Record: 26–11 (12–6 SEC)
- Head coach: Frank Martin (5th season)
- Assistant coaches: Matt Figger; Perry Clark; Bruce Shingler
- Home arena: Colonial Life Arena

2016–17 Southeastern Conference men's basketball standings
	Conf.				Overall
Team	W		L	PCT	W		L	PCT
No. 6 Kentucky †	16	–	2	.889	32	–	6	.842
No. 20 Florida	14	–	4	.778	27	–	9	.750
Arkansas	12	–	6	.667	26	–	10	.722
South Carolina	12	–	6	.667	26	–	11	.703
Ole Miss	10	–	8	.556	22	–	14	.611
Alabama	10	–	8	.556	19	–	15	.559
Vanderbilt	10	–	8	.556	19	–	16	.543
Georgia	9	–	9	.500	19	–	15	.559
Texas A&M	8	–	10	.444	16	–	15	.516
Tennessee	8	–	10	.444	16	–	16	.500
Auburn	7	–	11	.389	18	–	14	.563
Mississippi State	6	–	12	.333	16	–	16	.500
LSU	2	–	16	.111	10	–	21	.323
Missouri	2	–	16	.111	8	–	24	.250
† 2017 SEC tournament winner Rankings from AP poll

The 2016–17 South Carolina Gamecocks men's basketball team represented the University of South Carolina during the 2016–17 NCAA Division I men's basketball season. The team's head coach, Frank Martin, was in his fifth season at South Carolina. The team played its home games at Colonial Life Arena in Columbia, South Carolina as a member of the Southeastern Conference. They finished the season 26–11, 12–6 in SEC play to finish in a tie for third place. They lost in the quarterfinals of the SEC tournament to Alabama. They received an at-large bid to the NCAA tournament where they defeated Marquette, Duke, Baylor and SEC member Florida to advance to their first final four in school history where they lost to Gonzaga. Their final total of 26 wins is the most wins in school history.

== Previous season ==
The Gamecocks finished the season 25–9, 11–7 in SEC play to finish in a three-way tie for third place. They lost in the quarterfinals of the SEC tournament to Georgia. They were invited to the National Invitation Tournament where they defeated High Point in the first round to advance to the second round where they lost to Georgia Tech.

== Departures ==
Name	Number	Pos.	Height	Weight	Year	Hometown	Notes
Marcus Stroman	1	G	6'2"	183	Sophomore	Columbia, SC	Transferred to Louisiana–Lafayette
Raymond Doby	2	F	6'7"	230	Freshman	Cahokia, IL	Transferred to John A. Logan College
Jamall Gregory	4	G	6'4"	180	Freshman	Washington, D.C.	Transferred to Jacksonville State
Laimonas Chatkevičius	14	F	6'11"	251	Senior	Klaipėda, Lithuania	Graduated
Eric Cobb	23	F	6'10"	275	Freshman	Jacksonville, FL	Dismissed from the team due to BB gun incident
Michael Carrera	24	F	6'5"	212	Senior	Anzoátegui, Venezuela	Graduated
Mindaugas Kačinas	25	F	6'7"	227	Senior	Klaipėda, Lithuania	Graduated
Brian Steele	35	F	6'5"	195	Senior	Greenville, SC	Graduated

=== Incoming transfers ===
Name	Number	Pos.	Height	Weight	Year	Hometown	Previous School
Kory Holden	1	G	6'2"	180	Junior	Salisbury, MD	Transferred from Delaware. Under NCAA transfer rules, Holden had to sit out the 2016–17 season. Will have two years of eligibility left.
Hassani Gravett	2	G	6'2"	180	Sophomore	Douglasville, GA	Junior college transfer from Pensacola State College; was immediately eligible.
Ran Tut	14	F	6'9"	210	Junior	Melbourne, Australia	Junior college transfer from Monroe College; was immediately eligible.

== Recruits ==
College recruiting information
Name	Hometown	School	Height	Weight	Commit date
Sedee Keita #22 PF	Philadelphia, PA	22ft Academy	6 ft 10 in (2.08 m)	215 lb (98 kg)	Nov 2, 2015
Sedee Keita #22 PF	Recruit ratings: Scout: Rivals: 247Sports: ESPN:				
Rakym Felder #70 PG	Fort Mill, SC	Lincoln High School	6 ft 0 in (1.83 m)	180 lb (82 kg)	Mar 6, 2016
Rakym Felder #70 PG	Recruit ratings: Scout: Rivals: 247Sports: ESPN:				
Maik Kotsar; PF	Tallinn, Estonia	Sunrise Christian Academy	6 ft 9 in (2.06 m)	220 lb (100 kg)	Mar 7, 2016
Maik Kotsar; PF	Recruit ratings: Scout: Rivals: 247Sports: ESPN:				
Overall recruit ranking: Scout: 28 Rivals: 23 ESPN: 23
Note: In many cases, Scout, Rivals, 247Sports, On3, and ESPN may conflict in their listings of height and weight.; In these cases, the average was taken. ESPN grades are on a 100-point scale.; Sources: "South Carolina 2016 Basketball Commitments". Rivals.; "2016 South Carolina Basketball Commits". Scout.; "ESPN". ESPN.; "Scout.com Team Recruiting Rankings". Scout.; "2016 Team Ranking". Rivals.

== Roster ==
2016–17 South Carolina Gamecocks men's basketball team
Players
Coaches

Pos.	#	Name	Height	Weight	Year	Previous school	Hometown
G	0	Sindarius Thornwell	6 ft 5 in (1.96 m)	211 lb (96 kg)	Sr	Oak Hill Academy	Lancaster, SC
G	1	Kory Holden (I) (redshirt)	6 ft 1 in (1.85 m)	181 lb (82 kg)	Jr	J.B. Bennett; Delaware	Salisbury, MD
G	2	Hassani Gravett	6 ft 1 in (1.85 m)	183 lb (83 kg)	RS So	Alexander; Pensacola State College	Villa Rica, GA
G	4	Rakym Felder	5 ft 10 in (1.78 m)	210 lb (95 kg)	Fr	Lincoln	Brooklyn, NY
G	5	TeMarcus Blanton	6 ft 5 in (1.96 m)	206 lb (93 kg)	RS So	Luella	Locust Grove, GA
G	10	Duane Notice	6 ft 2 in (1.88 m)	225 lb (102 kg)	Sr	St. Thomas More School	Woodbridge, ON
F	12	Khadim Gueye	7 ft 0 in (2.13 m)	235 lb (107 kg)	Fr	Victory Rock Prep	Dakar, Senegal
G	13	Tommy Corchiani (W)	6 ft 1 in (1.85 m)	173 lb (78 kg)	Fr	Ravenscroft	Raleigh, NC
F	14	Ran Tut (W)	6 ft 9 in (2.06 m)	210 lb (95 kg)	Jr	Edison Academy; Monroe College	Melbourne, Australia
G	15	PJ Dozier	6 ft 6 in (1.98 m)	205 lb (93 kg)	So	Spring Valley HS	Columbia, SC
G	20	Justin McKie	6 ft 4 in (1.93 m)	204 lb (93 kg)	Sr	Irmo HS	Columbia, SC
F	21	Maik Kotsar	6 ft 10 in (2.08 m)	245 lb (111 kg)	Fr	Sunrise Christian Academy	Tallinn, Estonia
F	24	Sedee Keita	6 ft 9 in (2.06 m)	240 lb (109 kg)	Fr	22ft Basketball Academy	Philadelphia, PA
F	30	Chris Silva	6 ft 9 in (2.06 m)	223 lb (101 kg)	So	Roselle Catholic HS	Libreville, Gabon
F	31	Jarrell Holliman (W)	6 ft 7 in (2.01 m)	206 lb (93 kg)	RS Jr	Alpharetta HS; Elmhurst College	Alpharetta, GA
G	34	John Ragin (W)	6 ft 2 in (1.88 m)	177 lb (80 kg)	So	Cardinal Newman HS	Eastover, SC

Head coach

- Frank Martin (FIU)

Assistant coach(es)

- Matt Figger (Eastern Kentucky)
- Perry Clark (Gettysburg)
- Lamont Evans (Kansas State)

Legend

- (C) Team captain
- (S) Suspended
- (I) Ineligible
- (W) Walk-on
- Injured
- Current redshirt

Roster

== Schedule and results ==
Date time, TV	Rank^{#}	Opponent^{#}	Result	Record	High points	High rebounds	High assists	Site (attendance) city, state
Exhibition
11/06/2016*; 4:00 pm		Newberry	W 107–89		34 – Thornwell	11 – Thornwell	5 – Thornwell	Colonial Life Arena; Columbia, SC
Non-conference games
11/11/2016*; 6:30 pm		Louisiana Tech	W 85–76	1–0	18 – Thornwell	7 – Thornwell	6 – Thornwell	Colonial Life Arena (13,344); Columbia, SC
11/13/2016*; 6:00 pm		Holy Cross	W 81–49	2–0	20 – Thornwell	8 – Silva	5 – Tied	Colonial Life Arena (9,270); Columbia, SC
11/15/2016*; 6:30 pm		Monmouth	W 70–69 ^{OT}	3–0	23 – Thornwell	10 – Silva	6 – Thornwell	Colonial Life Arena (9,779); Columbia, SC
11/18/2016*; 6:30 pm		South Carolina State	W 92–50	4–0	22 – Thornwell	8 – Kotsar	6 – Dozier	Colonial Life Arena (10,159); Columbia, SC
11/23/2016*; 5:00 pm, ESPNU		No. 25 Michigan	W 61–46	5–0	21 – Thornwell	10 – Thornwell	4 – Gravett	Colonial Life Arena (13,051); Columbia, SC
11/26/2016*; 2:00 pm, ASN		vs. No. 18 Syracuse; Brooklyn Hoops Holiday Invitational	W 64–50	6–0	16 – Tied	10 – Dozier	5 – Thornwell	Barclays Center (8,733); Brooklyn, NY
12/01/2016*; 6:30 pm, SECN+	No. 20	Vermont	W 68–50	7–0	21 – Dozier	6 – Tied	9 – Thornwell	Colonial Life Arena (11,579); Columbia, SC
12/04/2016*; 2:00 pm, SECN+	No. 20	FIU	W 70–54	8–0	27 – Notice	7 – Tied	4 – Felder	Colonial Life Arena (10,587); Columbia, SC
12/12/2016*; 9:00 pm, FS1	No. 16	vs. Seton Hall; Under Armour Reunion	L 64–67	8–1	20 – Dozier	9 – Silva	3 – Dozier	Madison Square Garden (7,558); New York City, NY
12/17/2016*; 1:00 pm, CBSSN	No. 16	at South Florida	W 77–66	9–1	23 – Dozier	9 – Kotsar	5 – Tied	USF Sun Dome (2,489); Tampa, FL
12/21/2016*; 9:00 pm, ESPNU	No. 22	Clemson; Rivalry	L 60–62	9–2	26 – Dozier	8 – Tied	5 – Dozier	Colonial Life Arena (17,026); Columbia, SC
12/27/2016*; 7:00 pm, SECN		Lander	W 90–62	10–2	20 – Felder	11 – Tied	5 – Gravett	Colonial Life Arena (10,088); Columbia, SC
12/30/2016*; 9:00 pm, ESPN2		at Memphis	L 54–70	10–3	13 – Dozier	8 – Silva	2 – Tied	FedEx Forum (10,812); Memphis, TN
SEC regular season
01/04/2017; 7:00 pm, ESPN2		at Georgia	W 67–61	11–3 (1–0)	24 – Dozier	11 – Thornwell	5 – Dozier	Stegeman Coliseum (8,856); Athens, GA
01/07/2017; 1:30 pm, CBS		Texas A&M	W 79–68	12–3 (2–0)	19 – Notice	7 – Thornwell	4 – Dozier	Colonial Life Arena (14,249); Columbia, SC
01/11/2017; 6:30 pm, SECN		at Tennessee	W 70–60	13–3 (3–0)	22 – Thornwell	8 – Kotsar	4 – Thornwell	Thompson–Boling Arena (13,794); Knoxville, TN
01/14/2017; 6:30 pm, ESPNU		Ole Miss	W 67–56	14–3 (4–0)	16 – Tied	11 – Silva	3 – Tied	Colonial Life Arena (15,202); Columbia, SC
01/18/2017; 6:30 pm, SECN	No. 24	No. 19 Florida	W 57–53	15–3 (5–0)	20 – Thornwell	9 – Kotsar	3 – Felder	Colonial Life Arena (15,638); Columbia, SC
01/21/2017; 6:00 pm, ESPN	No. 24	at No. 5 Kentucky	L 69–85	15–4 (5–1)	34 – Thornwell	6 – Thornwell	4 – Tied	Rupp Arena (24,389); Lexington, KY
01/24/2017; 6:30 pm, SECN	No. 23	Auburn	W 98–69	16–4 (6–1)	27 – Notice	8 – Tied	5 – Thornwell	Colonial Life Arena (14,356); Columbia, SC
01/28/2017; 8:30 pm, SECN	No. 23	at Missouri	W 63–53	17–4 (7–1)	16 – Thornwell	11 – Thornwell	2 – Tied	Mizzou Arena (10,190); Columbia, MO
02/01/2017; 6:30 pm, SECN	No. 19	at LSU	W 88–63	18–4 (8–1)	17 – Tied	8 – Silva	4 – Dozier	Maravich Center (6,478); Baton Rouge, LA
02/04/2017; 2:00 pm, ESPN2	No. 19	Georgia	W 77–75	19–4 (9–1)	21 – Dozier	7 – Tied	3 – Tied	Colonial Life Arena (18,000); Columbia, SC
02/07/2017; 6:30 pm, SECN	No. 19	Alabama	L 86–90 ^{4OT}	19–5 (9–2)	44 – Thornwell	21 – Thornwell	2 – Tied	Colonial Life Arena (14,450); Columbia, SC
02/11/2017; 8:00 pm, ESPN2	No. 19	at Mississippi State	W 77–73	20–5 (10–2)	28 – Thornwell	5 – Tied	4 – Thornwell	Humphrey Coliseum (7,635); Starkville, MS
02/15/2017; 6:30 pm, SECN	No. 21	Arkansas	L 76–83	20–6 (10–3)	27 – Thornwell	8 – Silva	3 – Thornwell	Colonial Life Arena (13,001); Columbia, SC
02/18/2017; 8:30 pm, SECN	No. 21	at Vanderbilt	L 62–71	20–7 (10–4)	21 – Thornwell	7 – Dozier	3 – Notice	Memorial Gymnasium (10,471); Nashville, TN
02/21/2017; 7:00 pm, ESPN		at No. 13 Florida	L 66–81	20–8 (10–5)	23 – Thornwell	10 – Thornwell	3 – Dozier	O'Connell Center (11,051); Gainesville, FL
02/25/2017; 1:00 pm, SECN		Tennessee	W 82–55	21–8 (11–5)	19 – Dozier	6 – Tied	4 – Dozier	Colonial Life Arena (16,117); Columbia, SC
02/28/2017; 7:00 pm, ESPNU		Mississippi State	W 63–57	22–8 (12–5)	22 – Thornwell	11 – Silva	4 – Notice	Colonial Life Arena (15,230); Columbia, SC
03/04/2017; 8:30 pm, SECN		at Ole Miss	L 70–75	22–9 (12–6)	25 – Thornwell	9 – Dozier	6 – Tied	The Pavilion at Ole Miss (7,161); Oxford, MS
SEC Tournament
03/10/2017; 3:30 pm, SECN	(4)	vs. (5) Alabama; Quarterfinals	L 54–63	22–10	16 – Thornwell	5 – Tied	2 – Dozier	Bridgestone Arena (18,130); Nashville, TN
NCAA tournament
03/17/2017*; 9:50 pm, TBS	(7 E)	vs. (10 E) Marquette; First Round	W 93–73	23–10	29 – Thornwell	11 – Thornwell	4 – Tied	Bon Secours Wellness Arena (14,180); Greenville, SC
03/19/2017*; 8:40 pm, TNT	(7 E)	vs. (2 E) No. 7 Duke; Second Round	W 88–81	24–10	24 – Thornwell	10 – Silva	5 – Thornwell	Bon Secours Wellness Arena (14,216); Greenville, SC
03/24/2017*; 7:29 pm, TBS	(7 E)	vs. (3 E) No. 12 Baylor; Sweet Sixteen	W 70–50	25–10	24 – Thornwell	7 – Silva	4 – Notice	Madison Square Garden (20,047); New York, NY
03/26/2017*; 2:20 pm, CBS	(7 E)	vs. (4 E) No. 20 Florida; Elite Eight	W 77–70	26–10	26 – Thornwell	9 – Silva	3 – Notice	Madison Square Garden (20,047); New York, NY
04/01/2017*; 6:09 pm, CBS	(7 E)	vs. (1 W) No. 2 Gonzaga; Final Four	L 73–77	26–11	17 – Dozier	13 – Silva	9 – Dozier	University of Phoenix Stadium (77,612); Glendale, AZ
*Non-conference game. ^{#}Rankings from AP Poll. (#) Tournament seedings in parentheses. E=East Region, W=West Region. All times are in Eastern Time.

== Rankings ==
Ranking movements Legend: ██ Increase in ranking ██ Decrease in ranking — = Not ranked RV = Received votes
	Week																			
Poll	Pre	1	2	3	4	5	6	7	8	9	10	11	12	13	14	15	16	17	18	Final
AP	—	—	—	20	19	16	22	RV	—	RV	24	23	19	19	19	21	RV	—	—	Not released
Coaches	—	—	—	23	18	15	20	25	RV	RV		24	24	20	16	19	—	—	—	6

*AP does not release post-NCAA tournament rankings
