= Daryl Macon =

American basketball player (born 1995)

Free agent
- Position: Shooting guard / point guard

Personal information
- Born: November 29, 1995 (age 30) Little Rock, Arkansas, U.S.
- Listed height: 6 ft 2 in (1.88 m)
- Listed weight: 185 lb (84 kg)

Career information
- High school: Parkview (Little Rock, Arkansas)
- College: Holmes CC (2014–2016); Arkansas (2016–2018)
- NBA draft: 2018: undrafted
- Playing career: 2018–present

Career history
- 2018–2019: Dallas Mavericks
- 2018–2019: →Texas Legends
- 2019–2020: Miami Heat
- 2019–2020: →Sioux Falls Skyforce
- 2020: Sioux Falls Skyforce
- 2020–2021: Galatasaray
- 2021: AEK Athens
- 2021–2022: Panathinaikos
- 2022–2023: UNICS Kazan
- 2023: Shenzhen Leopards
- 2025: Shanghai Sharks
- 2025–2026: Maroussi
- 2026: Dinamo Sassari
- 2026: Fujian Sturgeons

Career highlights
- VTB United League champion (2023); All-VTB United League First Team (2023); Greek Super Cup winner (2021); All-Greek League Second Team (2021); Second-team All-SEC (2018)
- Stats at NBA.com
- Stats at Basketball Reference

Daryl Macon Jr. (born November 29, 1995) is an American professional basketball player for the Fujian Sturgeons of the Chinese Basketball Association (CBA). He played college basketball for Holmes Community College and the Arkansas Razorbacks.

== Early life ==
Macon's parents are Deloise and Daryl Macon Sr., and he has two sisters, Tiffany and Tierra.

He attended Parkview Arts and Science Magnet High School in Little Rock, Arkansas. Playing for the basketball team, as a senior he averaged 21.2 points per game and shot over 40 percent from three-point circle, and was named first team 6A All-State.

== College career ==
Macon began his college basketball career at Holmes Community College in 2014–15, where he was named a junior college All-American after averaging 23 points (fourth in the NJCAA), 4.1 rebounds and 3.1 assists per game, while shooting 88.9 per cent from the line, as a freshman. In 2015–16, he averaged 23.9 points (sixth in the NJCAA), 3.7 rebounds, and 3.2 assists per game, while shooting 82.9 percent from the foul line, and was named to the NJCAA Division I Men's Basketball Third Team All-America as a sophomore. He transferred to Arkansas Razorbacks, spurning offers from Ole Miss, Mississippi State, Memphis and UMass.

As a junior in 2016–17, Macon was second on the team in scoring, averaging 13.4 points, 2.6 rebounds, 2.2 assists and 1.1 steals per game. He was named to the All-SEC Tournament team and earned SEC Player of the Week honors in February 2017 after posting 30 points against Ole Miss. After the season, he declared for the 2017 NBA draft but did not hire an agent and ultimately returned to Arkansas.

As a senior, he was named to the Second Team All-SEC. Macon averaged 17.1 points and 4.0 assists per game and led the SEC in three-point shooting at a 43.8 percent clip. He was named SEC Player of the Week three times as a senior and joined teammate Jaylen Barford in the 1,000-point club on senior night.

== Professional career ==
=== Dallas Mavericks & Texas Legends (2018–2019) ===
After going undrafted in the 2018 NBA draft, Macon received contract offers from several NBA teams as well as overseas clubs. He joined the Miami Heat for the NBA Summer League. He signed a two-way contract with the Dallas Mavericks on July 30, 2018, splitting time between the Mavericks and their G League affiliate the Texas Legends. In his first game with the Legends, Macon scored 35 points on 12-of-18 shooting as the Legends defeated the Austin Spurs 126–120. Macon made his NBA debut on October 26, 2018, against the Toronto Raptors, playing one minute and scoring no points in the Mavericks' 107–116 loss.

On July 26, 2019, Macon was waived by the Mavericks.

=== Miami Heat & Sioux Falls Skyforce (2019–2020) ===
On September 20, 2019, Macon signed an Exhibit 10 contract with the Miami Heat. On October 19, after training camp, the Heat converted Macon's deal to a two-way contract with their G League affiliate, the Sioux Falls Skyforce. On January 8, 2020, the Miami Heat waived Macon. On January 16, 2020, the Sioux Falls Skyforce announced that they had acquired Macon via returning player right. Macon averaged 17.0 points and 4.7 assists per game for the Skyforce.

=== Galatasaray (2020–2021) ===
On July 24, 2020, Macon signed with Galatasaray of the Turkish Basketball Super League (BSL) and the Basketball Champions League.

=== AEK Athens (2021) ===
On January 29, 2021, Macon signed with AEK Athens of the Greek Basket League. Macon made his debut on February 6, 2021, against Peristeri, playing 28:09 minutes and scoring 18 points with 50% FG, 3 assists, 3 rebounds and 2 steals in the AEK 91–59 win. He ended the season with averages of 18.2 points and 3.7 assists per game.

=== Panathinaikos (2021–2022) ===
On July 11, 2021, Macon signed with Panathinaikos of the Greek Basket League and the EuroLeague. In 31 Greek Basket League games, he averaged 11.8 points, 1.9 rebounds and 3.7 assists (with 1.8 turnovers), playing around 23 minutes per contest. Additionally, in 31 EuroLeague games, he averaged 13.1 points, 2.2 rebounds and 3.6 assists (with 2.2 turnovers), playing around 26 minutes per contest.

=== UNICS Kazan (2022–23) ===
On July 9, 2022, Macon signed a two-year (1+1) contract with Russian club UNICS Kazan of the VTB United League. In 39 games he averaged 15.1 points, 3.7 assists, and 1.2 steals per game while shooting 86.6 per cent from the foul line.

=== Shenzhen Aviators (2023) ===
Playing for the Shenzhen Aviators in China in 2023–24, in 17 games he averaged 18.9 points, 6.1 assists (15th in the league), and 0.8 steals per game, while shooting 89.6% from the free throw line.

On August 24, 2024, Macon signed a contract to compete for Maccabi Tel Aviv of the Israeli Basketball Premier League and the EuroLeague. On September 10, Macon's contract was terminated. Macon carried an ACL injury from his previous season with Shenzhen and underwent surgery. He was originally planned to focus rehab in Israel, under the supervision of the medical staff of the club, but he returned to the United States.

=== Shanghai Sharks (2025) ===
In March 2025, Macon joined the Shanghai Sharks of the Chinese Basketball Association (CBA).

== Career statistics ==
Legend
GP	Games played	GS	Games started	MPG	Minutes per game
FG%	Field goal percentage	3P%	3-point field goal percentage	FT%	Free throw percentage
RPG	Rebounds per game	APG	Assists per game	SPG	Steals per game
BPG	Blocks per game	PPG	Points per game	**Bold**	Career high

=== NBA ===
==== Regular season ====
Year	Team	GP	GS	MPG	FG%	3P%	FT%	RPG	APG	SPG	BPG	PPG
2018–19	Dallas	**8**	0	**11.3**	**.370**	.455	.571	**1.5**	**.9**	**.1**	.0	**3.6**
2019–20	Miami	4	0	3.5	.333	**.500**	–	.0	.3	.0	.0	.8
Career		12	0	8.7	.367	.462	.571	1.0	.7	.1	.0	2.7

=== College ===
Year	Team	GP	GS	MPG	FG%	3P%	FT%	RPG	APG	SPG	BPG	PPG
2016–17	Arkansas	**36**	21	25.2	**.453**	.387	.866	2.6	2.2	**1.1**	**.1**	13.4
2017–18	Arkansas	35	**30**	**30.9**	.447	**.421**	**.875**	**2.9**	**3.9**	1.0	**.1**	**16.8**
Career		71	51	28.0	.450	.405	.871	2.8	3.1	1.1	.1	15.1
