= Moses Kingsley =

Nigerian basketball player (born 1994)

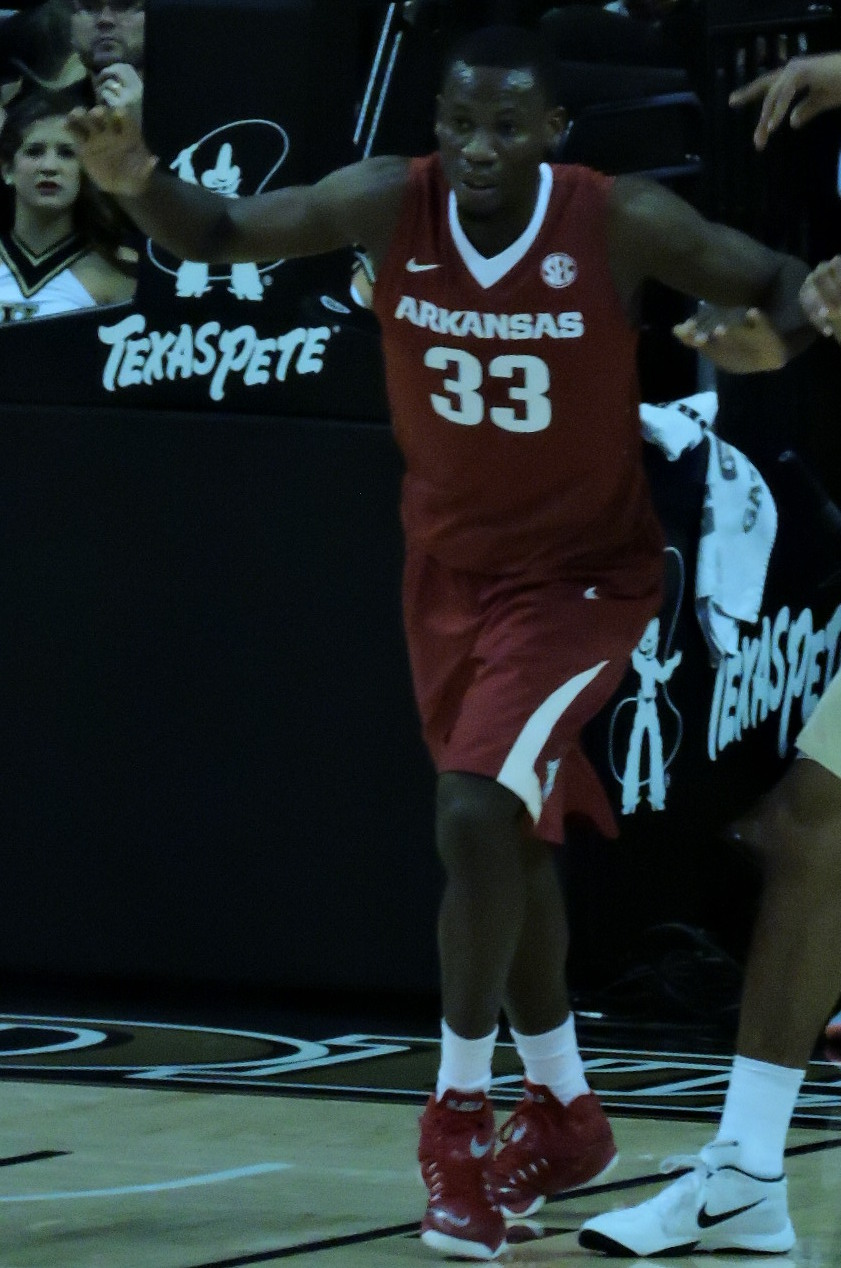
- Kingsley (33) with Arkansas in 2015

Free agent
- Position: Power forward / center

Personal information
- Born: November 16, 1994 (age 31) Enugu, Nigeria
- Listed height: 6 ft 10 in (2.08 m)
- Listed weight: 229 lb (104 kg)

Career information
- High school: Huntington Prep (Huntington, West Virginia)
- College: Arkansas (2013–2017)
- NBA draft: 2017: undrafted
- Playing career: 2017–present

Career history
- 2017–2019: Antwerp Giants
- 2019–2020: Peristeri
- 2020: Bilbao Basket
- 2020–2021: AEK Athens
- 2021–2022: Ionikos Nikaias

Career highlights
- Belgian Cup winner (2019); 2× Second-team All-SEC (2016, 2017); 2× SEC All-Defensive team (2016, 2017)

Moses Kingsley (born November 16, 1994) is a Nigerian professional basketball player who last played for Ionikos Nikaias of the Greek Basket League. He played college basketball for the Arkansas Razorbacks.

== College career ==
In his first two years at Arkansas, Kingsley played behind Bobby Portis. He had a breakout junior season, averaging 15.9 points and 9.3 rebounds per game and flirted with the 2016 NBA draft but decided to return. Coming into his senior year, he was named preseason SEC Player of the year. He did not quite live up to the hype, but averaged 12 points, 7.7 rebounds and 2.6 blocks per game and was a Second team All-SEC selection. As a senior, Kingsley led the Razorbacks to a 26-10 record and second round appearance in the NCAA Tournament. In his career, he finished 25th on the all-time Razorback scoring list with 1,200 points. He had 24 double-doubles during his career at Arkansas and his 256 blocks are third-most in school history.

== Professional career ==
Kingsley participated with the Minnesota Timberwolves during the NBA Summer League. On August 12, 2017, he signed with the Antwerp Giants of the Basketball League Belgium Division I.

On July 11, 2019, Kingsley signed with Peristeri of the Greek Basket League.

On July 17, 2020, he signed with RETAbet Bilbao Basket of the Liga ACB. Kingsley averaged 4.4 points and 2.4 rebounds per game. On December 12 of the same year, Kingsley signed with AEK Athens of the Greek Basket League.

On August 29, 2021, Kingsley signed with Ionikos Nikaias of the Greek Basket League. His season was marked by injuries and he appeared in only 10 games, averaging 5.3 points and 4.2 rebounds, in under 16 minutes per contest.

== The Basketball Tournament ==
Moses Kingsley played for Team Arkansas in the 2018 edition of The Basketball Tournament. In 2 games, he averaged 5 points, 5 rebounds, and 1.5 steals per game. Team Arkansas reached the second round before falling to the Talladega Knights.
