= Hérard =

Hérard is both a given name and a surname. Notable people with the name include:

- Hérard Abraham (1940–2022), former Haitian political figure
- Hérard Dumesle (1784–1858), Haitian poet and politician
- Schnider Hérard (born 1996), Haitian basketball player

== See also ==
- Charles Rivière-Hérard (1789–1850), officer in the Haitian Army under Alexandre Pétion
- Denis Herard, politician from Alberta, Canada
