= 2016–17 Mississippi State Bulldogs men's basketball team =

American college basketball season

2016–17 Mississippi State Bulldogs men's basketball
- Conference: Southeastern Conference
- Record: 16–16 (6–12 SEC)
- Head coach: Ben Howland (2nd season)
- Assistant coaches: George Brooks; Wes Flanigan; Ernie Zeigler
- Home arena: Humphrey Coliseum

2016–17 Southeastern Conference men's basketball standings
	Conf.				Overall
Team	W		L	PCT	W		L	PCT
No. 6 Kentucky †	16	–	2	.889	32	–	6	.842
No. 20 Florida	14	–	4	.778	27	–	9	.750
Arkansas	12	–	6	.667	26	–	10	.722
South Carolina	12	–	6	.667	26	–	11	.703
Ole Miss	10	–	8	.556	22	–	14	.611
Alabama	10	–	8	.556	19	–	15	.559
Vanderbilt	10	–	8	.556	19	–	16	.543
Georgia	9	–	9	.500	19	–	15	.559
Texas A&M	8	–	10	.444	16	–	15	.516
Tennessee	8	–	10	.444	16	–	16	.500
Auburn	7	–	11	.389	18	–	14	.563
Mississippi State	6	–	12	.333	16	–	16	.500
LSU	2	–	16	.111	10	–	21	.323
Missouri	2	–	16	.111	8	–	24	.250
† 2017 SEC tournament winner Rankings from AP poll

The 2016–17 Mississippi State Bulldogs basketball team represented Mississippi State University in the 2016–17 NCAA Division I men's basketball season. The Bulldogs, led by second year head coach Ben Howland, played their home games at the Humphrey Coliseum in Starkville, Mississippi as a member of the Southeastern Conference. They finished the season 16–16, 6–12 in SEC play to finish in 12th place. They defeated LSU in the SEC tournament before losing in the second round to Alabama.

== Previous season ==
The Bulldogs finished the season 14–17, 7–11 in SEC play to finish in 11th place. They lost to Georgia in the second round of the SEC tournament.

== Departures ==
Name	Number	Pos.	Height	Weight	Year	Hometown	Notes
Fred Thomas	1	Guard	6'5"	210	Senior	Jackson, MS	Graduated
Demetrius Houston	2	Forward	6'7"	205	Sophomore	Montgomery, AL	Transferred to Alabama State
Johnny Zuppardo	4	Forward	6'8"	226	Senior	Bay St. Louis, MS	Transferred
Malik Newman	14	Guard	6'3"	190	Freshman	Jackson, MS	Transferred to Kansas
Gavin Ware	20	Forward	6'9"	260	Senior	Starkville, MS	Graduated
Reggie Patterson	21	Guard	6'4"	168	Junior	Baldwyn, MS	Transferred
Fallou Ndoye	22	Center	6'11"	220	RS Sophomore	Dakar, Senegal	Transferred to Cal State Bakersfield
Travis Daniels	23	Guard	6'7"	225	Senior	Tuscaloosa, AL	Graduated
Craig Sword	32	Guard	6'3"	197	Senior	Montgomery, AL	Graduated

== Recruits ==
College recruiting information
Name	Hometown	School	Height	Weight	Commit date
Mario Kegler #11 SF	Jackson, MS	Oak Hill Academy	6 ft 8 in (2.03 m)	218 lb (99 kg)	Nov 11, 2015
Mario Kegler #11 SF	Recruit ratings: Scout: Rivals: 247Sports: ESPN:				
Schnider Hérard #9 C	Plano, TX	Prestonwood Christian Academy	6 ft 10 in (2.08 m)	260 lb (120 kg)	Nov 4, 2015
Schnider Hérard #9 C	Recruit ratings: Scout: Rivals: 247Sports: ESPN:				
Eli Wright #16 SG	Owensboro, KY	22ft Academy	6 ft 5 in (1.96 m)	190 lb (86 kg)	Aug 16, 2015
Eli Wright #16 SG	Recruit ratings: Scout: Rivals: 247Sports: ESPN:				
Abdulhakim Ado #11 C	Chattanooga, TN	Hamilton Heights Christian Academy	6 ft 10 in (2.08 m)	190 lb (86 kg)	Nov 16, 2015
Abdulhakim Ado #11 C	Recruit ratings: Scout: Rivals: 247Sports: ESPN:				
Tyson Carter #22 PG	Starkville, MS	Starkville Academy	6 ft 4 in (1.93 m)	170 lb (77 kg)	Oct 27, 2015
Tyson Carter #22 PG	Recruit ratings: Scout: Rivals: 247Sports: ESPN:				
Lamar Peters #23 PG	New Orleans, LA	L. B. Landry Senior High School	6 ft 1 in (1.85 m)	165 lb (75 kg)	Jun 6, 2015
Lamar Peters #23 PG	Recruit ratings: Scout: Rivals: 247Sports: ESPN:				
E. J. Datcher #44 C	Vincent, AL	Vincent High School	6 ft 8 in (2.03 m)	235 lb (107 kg)	Jun 6, 2015
E. J. Datcher #44 C	Recruit ratings: Scout: Rivals: 247Sports: ESPN:				
Overall recruit ranking: Scout: 16 Rivals: 25 247Sports: 23 ESPN: 19
Note: In many cases, Scout, Rivals, 247Sports, On3, and ESPN may conflict in their listings of height and weight.; In these cases, the average was taken. ESPN grades are on a 100-point scale.; Sources: "Mississippi State 2016 Basketball Commitments". Rivals.; "2016 Mississippi State Basketball Commits". Scout.; "ESPN". ESPN.; "Scout.com Team Recruiting Rankings". Scout.; "2016 Team Ranking". Rivals.

== Roster ==
2016–17 Mississippi State Bulldogs men's basketball team
Players
Coaches

Pos.	#	Name	Height	Weight	Year	Previous school	Hometown
G	1	Lamar Peters	6 ft 0 in (1.83 m)	181 lb (82 kg)	Fr	Landry-Walker HS	New Orleans, LA
G	3	Xavian Stapleton	6 ft 6 in (1.98 m)	195 lb (88 kg)	RS So	Madison Central HS; Louisiana Tech	Flora, MS
F	4	Mario Kegler	6 ft 7 in (2.01 m)	230 lb (104 kg)	Fr	Oak Hill Academy	Jackson, MS
F	5	Joe Strugg (W)	6 ft 9 in (2.06 m)	196 lb (89 kg)	RS Fr	G.W. Carver HS	Montgomery, AL
G	11	Quinndary Weatherspoon	6 ft 4 in (1.93 m)	202 lb (92 kg)	So	Velma Jackson HS	Camden, MS
G	12	Drew Davis (W)	5 ft 10 in (1.78 m)	172 lb (78 kg)	Jr	Fort Walton Beach HS	Atlanta, GA
G	13	Nick Singleton	6 ft 5 in (1.96 m)	190 lb (86 kg)	So	Kennesaw State	Decatur, GA
G	15	I. J. Ready	5 ft 11 in (1.8 m)	170 lb (77 kg)	Sr	Parkview Magnet HS	Little Rock, AR
C	20	Miles Washington (W)	6 ft 7 in (2.01 m)	195 lb (88 kg)	Fr	New Albany HS	New Albany, MS
G	23	Tyson Carter	6 ft 4 in (1.93 m)	155 lb (70 kg)	Fr	Starkville HS	Starkville, MS
F	24	Abdul Ado (I)	6 ft 11 in (2.11 m)	235 lb (107 kg)	Fr	Hamilton Heights HS	Chattanooga, TN
G	32	Eli Wright	6 ft 4 in (1.93 m)	197 lb (89 kg)	Fr	IMG Academy	Owensboro, KY
C	34	Schnider Hérard	6 ft 10 in (2.08 m)	260 lb (118 kg)	Fr	Prestonwood Christian HS	Port-au-Prince, Haiti
F	35	Aric Holman	6 ft 10 in (2.08 m)	218 lb (99 kg)	So	Owensboro HS	Owensboro, KY
C	45	E. J. Datcher	6 ft 9 in (2.06 m)	251 lb (114 kg)	Fr	Vincent HS	Vincent, AL

Head coach

- Ben Howland (Weber State)

Assistant coach(es)

- George Brooks (Mississippi State)
- Korey McCray (Mercer)
- Ernie Zeigler (Cleary)

Legend

- (C) Team captain
- (S) Suspended
- (I) Ineligible
- (W) Walk-on
- Injured
- Current redshirt

Roster

== Schedule and results ==
Date time, TV	Rank^{#}	Opponent^{#}	Result	Record	Site (attendance) city, state
Exhibition
11/04/2016*; 7:00 pm		Delta State	W 78–63		Humphrey Coliseum (3,721); Starkville, MS
Non-conference regular season
11/11/2016*; 7:00 pm		Norfolk State	W 78–74	1–0	Humphrey Coliseum (4,467); Starkville, MS
11/17/2016*; 4:00 pm, ESPN2		vs. UCF; Charleston Classic quarterfinals	L 61–86	1–1	TD Arena (3,430); Charleston, SC
11/18/2016*; 6:00 pm, ESPN3		vs. Boise State; Charleston Classic consolation round	W 80–68	2–1	TD Arena (3,517); Charleston, SC
11/20/2016*; 2:30 pm, ESPN3		vs. UTEP; Charleston Classic 5th place game	W 61–54	3–1	TD Arena (1,293); Charleston, SC
11/25/2016*; 7:00 pm		Lehigh	L 73–87	3–2	Humphrey Coliseum (6,697); Starkville, MS
11/28/2016*; 6:00 pm, SECN		Northwestern State	W 65–59	4–2	Humphrey Coliseum (6,070); Starkville, MS
12/01/2016*; 8:00 pm, ESPNU		Oregon State	W 74–57	5–2	Humphrey Coliseum (7,684); Starkville, MS
12/04/2016*; 4:00 pm		Georgia State	W 82–60	6–2	Humphrey Coliseum (6,805); Starkville, MS
12/14/2016*; 7:00 pm, SECN		East Tennessee State	L 65–67	6–3	Humphrey Coliseum (6,479); Starkville, MS
12/19/2016*; 8:00 pm, ESPNU		vs. Southern Miss	W 86–44	7–3	Mississippi Coliseum (4,031); Jackson, MS
12/22/2016*; 6:00 pm, SECN		Morehead State	W 85–76	8–3	Humphrey Coliseum (8,328); Starkville, MS
12/29/2016*; 7:00 pm		UMKC	W 77–54	9–3	Humphrey Coliseum (7,109); Starkville, MS
SEC regular season
01/03/2017; 7:30 pm, SECN		Alabama	L 58–68	9–4 (0–1)	Humphrey Coliseum (7,452); Starkville, MS
01/07/2017; 2:30 pm, SECN		at LSU	W 95–78	10–4 (1–1)	Maravich Center (7,626); Baton Rouge, LA
01/10/2017; 8:00 pm, SECN		at Arkansas	W 84–78	11–4 (2–1)	Bud Walton Arena (15,111); Fayetteville, AR
01/14/2017; 12:00 pm, CBS		Texas A&M	W 67–59	12–4 (3–1)	Humphrey Coliseum (8,588); Starkville, MS
01/17/2017; 6:00 pm, ESPN		No. 5 Kentucky	L 81–88	12–5 (3–2)	Humphrey Coliseum (9,768); Starkville, MS
01/21/2017; 5:00 pm, SECN		at Tennessee	L 74–91	12–6 (3–3)	Thompson–Boling Arena (13,917); Knoxville, TN
01/25/2017; 6:00 pm, SECN		Missouri	W 89–74	13–6 (4–3)	Humphrey Coliseum (7,101); Starkville, MS
01/28/2017; 7:30 pm, SECN		at Alabama	L 62–71	13–7 (4–4)	Coleman Coliseum (15,383); Tuscaloosa, AL
01/31/2017; 6:00 pm, SECN		at Ole Miss	L 61–88	13–8 (4–5)	The Pavilion at Ole Miss (8,205); Oxford, MS
02/04/2017; 2:30 pm, SECN		Tennessee	W 64–59	14–8 (5–5)	Humphrey Coliseum (7,581); Starkville, MS
02/07/2017; 8:00 pm, ESPNU		at Auburn	L 92–98	14–9 (5–6)	Auburn Arena (7,058); Auburn, AL
02/11/2017; 7:00 pm, ESPN2		No. 19 South Carolina	L 73–77	14–10 (5–7)	Humphrey Coliseum (7,635); Starkville, MS
02/14/2017; 8:00 pm, ESPNU		at Georgia	L 72–79	14–11 (5–8)	Stegeman Coliseum (5,822); Athens, GA
02/18/2017; 1:00 pm, ESPN		Florida	L 52–57	14–12 (5–9)	Humphrey Coliseum (7,980); Starkville, MS
02/21/2017; 8:00 pm, ESPN2		Ole Miss	L 82–87 ^{OT}	14–13 (5–10)	Humphrey Coliseum (7,863); Starkville, MS
02/25/2017; 3:00 pm, ESPNU		at Vanderbilt	L 48–77	14–14 (5–11)	Memorial Gymnasium (9,212); Nashville, TN
02/28/2017; 6:00 pm, ESPN2		at South Carolina	L 57–63	14–15 (5–12)	Colonial Life Arena (15,230); Columbia, SC
03/04/2017; 5:00 pm, SECN		LSU	W 88–76	15–15 (6–12)	Humphrey Coliseum (6,739); Starkville, MS
SEC tournament
03/08/2017; 6:00 pm, SECN	(12)	vs. (13) LSU; First Round	W 79–52	16–15	Bridgestone Arena (8,567); Nashville, TN
03/09/2017; 2:30 pm, SECN	(12)	vs. (5) Alabama; Second Round	L 55–75	16–16	Bridgestone Arena (11,973); Nashville, TN
*Non-conference game. ^{#}Rankings from AP Poll. (#) Tournament seedings in parentheses. All times are in Central Time.

== See also ==
2016–17 Mississippi State Bulldogs women's basketball team
