= 2016–17 Ole Miss Rebels men's basketball team =

American college basketball season

2016–17 Ole Miss Rebels men's basketball

NIT, Quarterfinals
- Conference: Southeastern Conference
- Record: 22–14 (10–8 SEC)
- Head coach: Andy Kennedy (11th season)
- Assistant coaches: Bill Armstrong; Tony Madlock; Todd Abernethy
- Home arena: The Pavilion at Ole Miss

2016–17 Southeastern Conference men's basketball standings
	Conf.				Overall
Team	W		L	PCT	W		L	PCT
No. 6 Kentucky †	16	–	2	.889	32	–	6	.842
No. 20 Florida	14	–	4	.778	27	–	9	.750
Arkansas	12	–	6	.667	26	–	10	.722
South Carolina	12	–	6	.667	26	–	11	.703
Ole Miss	10	–	8	.556	22	–	14	.611
Alabama	10	–	8	.556	19	–	15	.559
Vanderbilt	10	–	8	.556	19	–	16	.543
Georgia	9	–	9	.500	19	–	15	.559
Texas A&M	8	–	10	.444	16	–	15	.516
Tennessee	8	–	10	.444	16	–	16	.500
Auburn	7	–	11	.389	18	–	14	.563
Mississippi State	6	–	12	.333	16	–	16	.500
LSU	2	–	16	.111	10	–	21	.323
Missouri	2	–	16	.111	8	–	24	.250
† 2017 SEC tournament winner Rankings from AP poll

The 2016–17 Ole Miss Rebels men's basketball team represented the University of Mississippi in the 2016–17 NCAA Division I men's basketball season. Andy Kennedy was in his 11th year as head coach of Ole Miss. The Rebels were members of the Southeastern Conference and played their home games at The Pavilion at Ole Miss. They finished the season 22–14, 10–8 in SEC play to finish in a three-way tie for fifth place. They defeated Missouri in the second round of the SEC tournament before losing in the quarterfinals to Arkansas. They were invited to the National Invitation Tournament where they defeated Monmouth and Syracuse before losing in the quarterfinals to Georgia Tech.

== Previous season ==
The Rebels finished the season 20–12, 10–8 in SEC play to finish in a tie for sixth place. They lost to Alabama in the second round of the SEC tournament. Despite having 20 wins, they did not participate in a postseason tournament.

== Departures ==
Name	Number	Pos.	Height	Weight	Year	Hometown	Notes
Martavious Newby	1	G	6'3"	210	Senior	Memphis, TN	Graduated
J. T. Escobar	2	G	6'2"	177	Freshman	Tallahassee, FL	Transferred to North Florida
Sam Finley	10	G	6'2"	179	Junior	Corona, CA	Transferred to Cal State Northridge
Tomasz Gielo	12	F	6'9"	220	Senior	Szczecin, Poland	Graduated
Anthony Pérez	13	F	6'9"	213	Senior	Cumaná, Venezuela	Graduated
Alex Sheppard	15	G	6'3"	192	Freshman	Madden, MS	Walk-on; transferred to NW Mississippi CC
Terry Brutus	25	F	6'6"	237	RS Junior	Spring Valley, NY	Graduate transferred to Samford
Stefan Moody	42	G	5'10"	179	Senior	Kissimmee, FL	Graduated

=== Incoming transfers ===
Name	Number	Pos.	Height	Weight	Year	Hometown	Previous School
Cullen Neal	2	G	6'5"	195	RS Junior	Albuquerque, NM	Transferred from New Mexico. Will eligible to play since Neal graduated from New Mexico.
Dominik Olejniczak	44	C	7'0"	249	Sophomore	Toruń, Poland	Transferred from Drake. Under NCAA transfer rules, Olejniczak will have to sit out for the 2016–17 season. Will have three years of remaining eligibility.
Justas Furmanavičius	50	F	6'7"	210	Junior	Kaunas, Lithuania	Junior college transferred from Three Rivers Community College

== Recruits ==
College recruiting information
Name	Hometown	School	Height	Weight	Commit date
Nate Morris #27 C	Lancaster, TX	Lancaster High School	6 ft 10 in (2.08 m)	250 lb (110 kg)	Oct 27, 2015
Nate Morris #27 C	Recruit ratings: Scout: Rivals: 247Sports: ESPN:				
Breein Tyree #41 PG	Metuchen, NJ	St. Joseph High School	6 ft 2 in (1.88 m)	178 lb (81 kg)	Sep 28, 2015
Breein Tyree #41 PG	Recruit ratings: Scout: Rivals: 247Sports: ESPN:				
Karlis Silins; C	Riga, Latvia	BK VEF Rīga	6 ft 10 in (2.08 m)	225 lb (102 kg)	Nov 11, 2015
Karlis Silins; C	Recruit ratings: Scout: Rivals: 247Sports: ESPN:				
Overall recruit ranking: Scout: Not Ranked Rivals: Not Ranked ESPN: Not Ranked
Note: In many cases, Scout, Rivals, 247Sports, On3, and ESPN may conflict in their listings of height and weight.; In these cases, the average was taken. ESPN grades are on a 100-point scale.; Sources: "Ole Miss 2016 Basketball Commitments". Rivals.; "2016 Ole Miss Basketball Commits". Scout.; "ESPN". ESPN.; "Scout.com Team Recruiting Rankings". Scout.; "2016 Team Ranking". Rivals.

=== Recruiting class of 2017 ===
College recruiting information (2017)
Name	Hometown	School	Height	Weight	Commit date
J.J. Smith #32 SG	Mableton, GA	Pebblebrook High School	6 ft 4 in (1.93 m)	190 lb (86 kg)	Jan 9, 2016
J.J. Smith #32 SG	Recruit ratings: Scout: Rivals: 247Sports: ESPN:				
Tirus Smith; SF	Petal, MS	Petal High School	6 ft 7 in (2.01 m)	180 lb (82 kg)	Mar 8, 2016
Tirus Smith; SF	Recruit ratings: Scout: Rivals: 247Sports: ESPN:				
Overall recruit ranking: Scout: Not Ranked Rivals: Not Ranked ESPN: Not Ranked
Note: In many cases, Scout, Rivals, 247Sports, On3, and ESPN may conflict in their listings of height and weight.; In these cases, the average was taken. ESPN grades are on a 100-point scale.; Sources: "Ole Miss 2017 Basketball Commitments". Rivals.; "2017 Ole Miss Basketball Commits". Scout.; "ESPN". ESPN.; "Scout.com Team Recruiting Rankings". Scout.; "2017 Team Ranking". Rivals.

== Roster ==
2016–17 Ole Miss Rebels men's basketball team
Players
Coaches

Pos.	#	Name	Height	Weight	Year	Previous school	Hometown
G	0	Donte Fitzpatrick-Dorsey	6 ft 4 in (1.93 m)	183 lb (83 kg)	So	Southwind HS	Memphis, TN
G	1	Deandre Burnett	6 ft 2 in (1.88 m)	194 lb (88 kg)	RS Jr	Miami Carol City Sr. HS; Miami (FL)	Miami Gardens, FL
G	2	Cullen Neal	6 ft 5 in (1.96 m)	195 lb (88 kg)	RS Jr	Eldorado HS; New Mexico	Albuquerque, NM
G	3	Terence Davis	6 ft 4 in (1.93 m)	201 lb (91 kg)	So	Southaven HS	Southaven, MS
G	4	Breein Tyree	6 ft 2 in (1.88 m)	190 lb (86 kg)	Fr	St. Joseph HS	Somerset, NJ
F	5	Marcanvis Hymon	6 ft 7 in (2.01 m)	216 lb (98 kg)	Jr	Whitehaven HS	Memphis, TN
F	11	Sebastian Saiz	6 ft 9 in (2.06 m)	233 lb (106 kg)	Sr	Sunrise Christian Academy	Madrid, Spain
C	12	Karlis Silins	6 ft 10 in (2.08 m)	225 lb (102 kg)	Fr	BK VEF Rīga	Riga, Latvia
G	14	Rasheed Brooks	6 ft 5 in (1.96 m)	201 lb (91 kg)	Sr	Lexington HS; Southwest Tennessee CC	Mansfield, OH
F	30	Jake Coddington	6 ft 6 in (1.98 m)	212 lb (96 kg)	Sr	Marquette Catholic HS; Three Rivers CC	Edwardsville, IL
C	32	Nate Morris	6 ft 9 in (2.06 m)	240 lb (109 kg)	Fr	Lancaster HS	Dallas, TX
C	44	Dominik Olejniczak (I) (redshirt)	7 ft 0 in (2.13 m)	249 lb (113 kg)	So	SMS Cetniewo Academy; Drake	Toruń, Poland
F	50	Justas Furmanavičius	6 ft 6 in (1.98 m)	200 lb (91 kg)	Jr	Three Rivers CC	Kaunas, Lithuania

Head coach

- Andy Kennedy (UAB)

Assistant coach(es)

- Bill Armstrong (UAB)
- Tony Madlock (Memphis)
- Todd Abernethy (Mississippi)

Legend

- (C) Team captain
- (S) Suspended
- (I) Ineligible
- (W) Walk-on
- Injured
- Current redshirt

Roster

== Schedule and results ==
Date time, TV	Rank^{#}	Opponent^{#}	Result	Record	Site (attendance) city, state
Exhibition
11/03/2016*; 6:00 pm		Morehouse	W 90–66		The Pavilion at Ole Miss; Oxford, MS
Regular season
11/11/2016*; 6:00 pm, ESPN3		UT Martin	W 86–83	1–0	The Pavilion at Ole Miss (6,123); Oxford, MS
11/14/2016*; 6:00 pm, SECN		Massachusetts	W 90–88	2–0	The Pavilion at Ole Miss (5,291); Oxford, MS
11/18/2016*; 3:00 pm, CBSSN		vs. Oral Roberts; Paradise Jam quarterfinals	W 95–88 ^{OT}	3–0	Sports and Fitness Center (512); St. Thomas, VI
11/20/2016*; 5:00 pm, CBSSN		vs. Saint Joseph's; Paradise Jam semifinals	W 81–68	4–0	Sports and Fitness Center (2,755); St. Thomas, VI
11/21/2016*; 7:30 pm, CBSSN		vs. No. 12 Creighton; Paradise Jam finals	L 77–86	4–1	Sports and Fitness Center (2,699); St. Thomas, VI
11/24/2016*; 3:00 pm, ESPN3		Montana	W 86–81	5–1	The Pavilion at Ole Miss (7,358); Oxford, MS
11/30/2016*; 7:00 pm, ESPN3		Middle Tennessee	L 62–77	5–2	The Pavilion at Ole Miss; Oxford, MS
12/03/2016*; 12:00 pm, SECN		Memphis	W 85–77	6–2	The Pavilion at Ole Miss (7,411); Oxford, MS
12/11/2016*; 11:00 am, ESPNU		at Virginia Tech	L 75–80	6–3	Cassell Coliseum (7,522); Blacksburg, VA
12/15/2016*; 7:00 pm, ESPN3		Murray State	W 78–73	7–3	The Pavilion at Ole Miss (6,650); Oxford, MS
12/19/2016*; 8:00 pm, SECN		Bradley	W 66–49	8–3	The Pavilion at Ole Miss (7,792); Oxford, MS
12/22/2016*; 8:00 pm, SECN		South Alabama	W 92–58	9–3	The Pavilion at Ole Miss (7,260); Oxford, MS
12/29/2016; 7:00 pm, ESPN2		No. 8 Kentucky	L 76–99	9–4 (0–1)	The Pavilion at Ole Miss (9,086); Oxford, MS
01/03/2017; 6:00 pm, ESPNU		at No. 24 Florida	L 63–70	9–5 (0–2)	O'Connell Center (10,423); Gainesville, FL
01/07/2017; 5:00 pm, SECN		at Auburn	W 88–85	10–5 (1–2)	Auburn Arena (9,121); Auburn, AL
01/11/2017; 6:00 pm, ESPNU		Georgia	L 47–69	10–6 (1–3)	The Pavilion at Ole Miss (7,029); Oxford, MS
01/14/2017; 5:30 pm, ESPNU		at South Carolina	L 56–67	10–7 (1–4)	Colonial Life Arena (15,202); Columbia, SC
01/17/2017; 8:00 pm, SECN		Tennessee	W 80–69	11–7 (2–4)	The Pavilion at Ole Miss (6,085); Oxford, MS
01/21/2017; 2:30 pm, SECN		at Missouri	W 75–71	12–7 (3–4)	Mizzou Arena (10,378); Columbia, MO
01/25/2017; 6:30 pm, ESPN2		Texas A&M	L 76–80	12–8 (3–5)	The Pavilion at Ole Miss (7,055); Oxford, MS
01/28/2017*; 5:00 pm, ESPN2		No. 5 Baylor; Big 12/SEC Challenge	L 75–78	12–9	The Pavilion at Ole Miss (9,411); Oxford, MS
01/31/2017; 6:00 pm, SECN		Mississippi State	W 88–61	13–9 (4–5)	The Pavilion at Ole Miss (8,205); Oxford, MS
02/04/2017; 2:00 pm, ESPNU		at Vanderbilt	W 81–74	14–9 (5–5)	Memorial Gymnasium (9,287); Nashville, TN
02/08/2017; 5:30 pm, SECN		at Tennessee	L 66–75	14–10 (5–6)	Thompson–Boling Arena (12,209); Knoxville, TN
02/11/2017; 5:00 pm, SECN		Auburn	W 90–84	15–10 (6–6)	The Pavilion at Ole Miss (8,280); Oxford, MS
02/14/2017; 8:00 pm, SECN		LSU	W 96–76	16–10 (7–6)	The Pavilion at Ole Miss (7,131); Oxford, MS
02/18/2017; 5:00 pm, SECN		at Arkansas	L 80–98	16–11 (7–7)	Bud Walton Arena (17,356); Fayetteville, AR
02/21/2017; 8:00 pm, ESPN2		at Mississippi State	W 87–82 ^{OT}	17–11 (8–7)	Humphrey Coliseum (7,863); Starkville, MS
02/25/2017; 2:30 pm, SECN		Missouri	W 80–77	18–11 (9–7)	The Pavilion at Ole Miss (7,693); Oxford, MS
03/01/2017; 7:30 pm, SECN		at Alabama	L 55–70	18–12 (9–8)	Coleman Coliseum (10,672); Tuscaloosa, AL
03/04/2017; 7:30 pm, SECN		South Carolina	W 75–70	19–12 (10–8)	The Pavilion at Ole Miss (7,161); Oxford, MS
SEC tournament
03/09/2017; 8:00 pm, SECN	(6)	vs. (14) Missouri; Second Round	W 86–74	20–12	Bridgestone Arena (13,112); Nashville, TN
03/10/2017; 8:25 pm, SECN	(6)	vs. (3) Arkansas; Quarterfinals	L 72–73	20–13	Bridgestone Arena (14,227); Nashville, TN
NIT
03/14/2017*; 6:00 pm, ESPN2	(5)	at (4) Monmouth; First Round – Syracuse Bracket	W 91–83	21–13	OceanFirst Bank Center (1,672); West Long Branch, NJ
03/18/2017*; 10:00 am, ESPN	(5)	at (1) Syracuse; Second Round – Syracuse Bracket	W 85–80	22–13	Carrier Dome (9,556); Syracuse, NY
03/21/2017*; 8:00 pm, ESPN2	(5)	(6) Georgia Tech; Quarterfinals – Syracuse Bracket	L 66–74	22–14	The Pavilion at Ole Miss (9,091); Oxford, MS
*Non-conference game. ^{#}Rankings from AP Poll. (#) Tournament seedings in parentheses. All times are in Central Time.

== See also ==
- 2016–17 Ole Miss Rebels women's basketball team
