= 2016–17 Missouri Tigers men's basketball team =

American college basketball season

2016–17 Missouri Tigers men's basketball
- Conference: Southeastern Conference
- Record: 8–24 (2–16 SEC)
- Head coach: Kim Anderson (3rd season)
- Assistant coaches: Rob Fulford; Steve Shields; Brad Loos
- Home arena: Mizzou Arena

2016–17 Southeastern Conference men's basketball standings
	Conf.				Overall
Team	W		L	PCT	W		L	PCT
No. 6 Kentucky †	16	–	2	.889	32	–	6	.842
No. 20 Florida	14	–	4	.778	27	–	9	.750
Arkansas	12	–	6	.667	26	–	10	.722
South Carolina	12	–	6	.667	26	–	11	.703
Ole Miss	10	–	8	.556	22	–	14	.611
Alabama	10	–	8	.556	19	–	15	.559
Vanderbilt	10	–	8	.556	19	–	16	.543
Georgia	9	–	9	.500	19	–	15	.559
Texas A&M	8	–	10	.444	16	–	15	.516
Tennessee	8	–	10	.444	16	–	16	.500
Auburn	7	–	11	.389	18	–	14	.563
Mississippi State	6	–	12	.333	16	–	16	.500
LSU	2	–	16	.111	10	–	21	.323
Missouri	2	–	16	.111	8	–	24	.250
† 2017 SEC tournament winner Rankings from AP poll

The 2016–17 Missouri Tigers men's basketball team represented the University of Missouri in the 2016–17 NCAA Division I men's basketball season. Their head coach was Kim Anderson, who was in his third year as the head coach at Missouri. The team played its home games at Mizzou Arena in Columbia, Missouri, and was in its fifth season in the Southeastern Conference. They finished the season 8–24, 2–16 in SEC play to finish in a tie for 13th place. As the No. 14 seed in the SEC tournament, they defeated Auburn in the first round before losing in the second round to Ole Miss.

On March 5, 2017, head coach Kim Anderson was asked to step down as head coach of the Tigers following the season. He was allowed to coach the team in the SEC tournament. On March 15, the school hired Cuonzo Martin as head coach.

== Previous season ==
The Tigers finished the 2015–16 season 10–21, 3–15 in SEC play to finish in last place. Due to a self-imposed postseason ban, Missouri did not participate in the SEC tournament.

== Departures ==
Name	Number	Pos.	Height	Weight	Year	Hometown	Reason for departure
Martavian Payne	2	G	6'2"	190	Junior	St. Louis, MO	Graduate transferred to Lindenwood–Belleville
Tramaine Isabell	4	G	6'1"	185	Sophomore	Seattle, WA	Transferred to Drexel
D'Angelo Allen	5	F	6'6"	185	Sophomore	Dallas, TX	Transferred to William Penn
Jimmy Barton	11	G	5'9"	160	Junior	St. Louis, MO	Transferred to Maryville University
Namon Wright	12	G	6'4"	175	Sophomore	Los Angeles, CA	Transferred to Colorado
Wes Clark	15	G	6'0"	171	Junior	Detroit, MI	Dismissed from the team due to academic failures
JaKeenan Gant	23	F	6'8"	200	Sophomore	Springfield, GA	Transferred to Louisiana–Lafayette
Hayden Barnard	42	F	6'10"	215	RS sophomore	Aurora, IL	Left the team for personal reasons
Ryan Rosburg	44	C	6'11"	245	Senior	Chesterfield, MO	Graduated

=== Incoming transfers ===
Name	Number	Pos.	Height	Weight	Year	Hometown	Previous school
Jordan Geist	15	G	6'1"	175	Sophomore	Fort Wayne, IN	Junior college transferred from Ranger College

== 2016 recruiting class ==
College recruiting
Name	Hometown	School	Height	Weight	Commit date
Mitchell Smith #24 C	Van Buren, AR	Van Buren High School	6 ft 9 in (2.06 m)	190 lb (86 kg)	Sep 19, 2015
Mitchell Smith #24 C	Recruit ratings: Scout: Rivals: 247Sports: (79)				
Reed Nikko #33 C	Maple Grove, MN	Maple Grove High School	6 ft 8 in (2.03 m)	230 lb (100 kg)	Oct 5, 2015
Reed Nikko #33 C	Recruit ratings: Scout: Rivals: 247Sports: (77)				
Willie Jackson #38 SF	Garfield Heights, OH	Garfield Heights High School	6 ft 5 in (1.96 m)	195 lb (88 kg)	Sep 23, 2015
Willie Jackson #38 SF	Recruit ratings: Scout: Rivals: 247Sports: (76)				
Frankie Hughes #56 SG	Garfield Heights, OH	Garfield Heights High School	6 ft 4 in (1.93 m)	170 lb (77 kg)	Apr 10, 2016
Frankie Hughes #56 SG	Recruit ratings: Scout: Rivals: 247Sports: (74)				
Jakoby Kemp; PF	Layton, UT	Layton High School	6 ft 9 in (2.06 m)	200 lb (91 kg)	Jun 27, 2016
Jakoby Kemp; PF	Recruit ratings: Scout: Rivals: 247Sports: (NR)				
Overall recruit ranking:
Note: In many cases, Scout, Rivals, 247Sports, On3, and ESPN may conflict in their listings of height and weight.; In these cases, the average was taken. ESPN grades are on a 100-point scale.; Sources:

== Future recruits ==
=== 2017 recruiting class ===
College recruiting
Name	Hometown	School	Height	Weight	Commit date
Michael Porter Jr. #1 SF	Columbia, MO	Nathan Hale High School	6 ft 10 in (2.08 m)	212 lb (96 kg)	Mar 24, 2017
Michael Porter Jr. #1 SF	Recruit ratings: Scout: Rivals: 247Sports: (97)				
Jeremiah Tilmon #7 C	East St. Louis, IL	East St. Louis High School	6 ft 11 in (2.11 m)	230 lb (100 kg)	May 15, 2017
Jeremiah Tilmon #7 C	Recruit ratings: Scout: Rivals: 247Sports: (88)				
Blake Harris #29 CG	Chapel Hill, NC	Word of God Christian Academy	6 ft 3 in (1.91 m)	180 lb (82 kg)	Apr 9, 2017
Blake Harris #29 CG	Recruit ratings: Scout: Rivals: 247Sports: (83)				
C. J. Roberts #35 PG	North Richlands Hills, TX	Richland High School	6 ft 0 in (1.83 m)	180 lb (82 kg)	Sep 19, 2016
C. J. Roberts #35 PG	Recruit ratings: Scout: Rivals: 247Sports: (80)				
Jontay Porter #9 PF	Columbia, MO	Nathan Hale High School	6 ft 9 in (2.06 m)	230 lb (100 kg)	May 22, 2017
Jontay Porter #9 PF	Recruit ratings: Scout: Rivals: 247Sports: ESPN: (94)				
Overall recruit ranking: Scout: #7 Rivals: #7 247Sports: #8 ESPN: #7
Note: In many cases, Scout, Rivals, 247Sports, On3, and ESPN may conflict in their listings of height and weight.; In these cases, the average was taken. ESPN grades are on a 100-point scale.; Sources:

== Roster ==
2016–17 Missouri Tigers men's basketball team
Players
Coaches

Pos.	#	Name	Height	Weight	Year	Previous school	Hometown
G	1	Terrence Phillips	5 ft 11 in (1.8 m)	180 lb (82 kg)	So	Oak Hill Academy	Orange County, CA
F	2	Willie Jackson	6 ft 6 in (1.98 m)	212 lb (96 kg)	Fr	Garfield Heights H.S.	Cleveland, OH
G	3	Frankie Hughes	6 ft 4 in (1.93 m)	187 lb (85 kg)	Fr	Garfield Heights H.S.	Cleveland, OH
F	4	Jakoby Kemp	6 ft 9 in (2.06 m)	215 lb (98 kg)	Fr	Layton H.S.	Layton, UT
F	5	Mitchell Smith	6 ft 10 in (2.08 m)	210 lb (95 kg)	Fr	Van Buren H.S.	Van Buren, AR
G	10	Brett Rau (W)	6 ft 4 in (1.93 m)	170 lb (77 kg)	Jr	Burlington H.S. Elgin CC	Burlington, IL
G	11	K. J. Walton	6 ft 3 in (1.91 m)	200 lb (91 kg)	So	Brownsburg H.S.	Brownsburg, IN
G	13	Trevor Glassman (W)	6 ft 3 in (1.91 m)	200 lb (91 kg)	RS Jr	New Hampton School; Mahattan	Bedford, NH
G	14	Reed Nikko	6 ft 10 in (2.08 m)	250 lb (113 kg)	Fr	Maple Grove H.S.	Maple Grove, MN
G	15	Jordan Geist	6 ft 2 in (1.88 m)	180 lb (82 kg)	RS So	Homestead H.S. Ranger College	Fort Wayne, IN
F	21	Jordan Barnett	6 ft 7 in (2.01 m)	215 lb (98 kg)	Jr	Christian Brothers College H.S. Texas	Saint Louis, MO
F	24	Kevin Puryear	6 ft 7 in (2.01 m)	247 lb (112 kg)	So	Blue Springs South H.S.	Blue Springs, MO
F	25	Russell Woods	6 ft 8 in (2.03 m)	230 lb (104 kg)	Sr	Simeon Career Academy; John A. Logan C.C.	Chicago, IL
F	32	Adam Wolf	6 ft 7 in (2.01 m)	216 lb (98 kg)	So	Beaver Dam H.S.	Beaver Dam, WI
G	33	Cullen VanLeer	6 ft 4 in (1.93 m)	206 lb (93 kg)	So	Pacific H.S.	Pacific, MO

Head coach

- Kim Anderson (Missouri)

Assistant coach(es)

- Emanuel Dildy (Eastern Illinois)
- Rob Fulford (Marshall)
- Steve Shields (Baylor)

Legend

- (C) Team captain
- (S) Suspended
- (I) Ineligible
- (W) Walk-on
- Injured
- Current redshirt

Roster

== Schedule and results ==
Date time, TV	Rank^{#}	Opponent^{#}	Result	Record	High points	High rebounds	High assists	Site (attendance) city, state
Exhibition
11/04/2016*; 7:00 pm		Central Missouri	W 66–59		15 – Hughes	8 – Jackson, Puryear	4 – Phillips	Mizzou Arena (3,973); Columbia, MO
Non-conference regular season
11/13/2016*; 7:00 pm, SECN		Alabama A&M	W 99–44	1–0	23 – Hughes	9 – Jackson, Puryear	5 – Phillips, Vanleer	Mizzou Arena (3,977); Columbia, MO
11/17/2016*; 10:00 am, ESPNU		vs. No. 11 Xavier; Tire Pros Invitational quarterfinals	L 82–83 ^{OT}	1–1	24 – Hughes	10 – Puryear	5 – Phillips	HP Field House; Orlando, FL
11/18/2016*; 10:30 am, ESPNU		vs. Davidson; Tire Pros Invitational 2nd round consolation	L 55–70	1–2	12 – Puryear	6 – Puryear, Walton	6 – Phillips	HP Field House; Orlando, FL
11/20/2016*; 11:00 am, ESPN3		vs. Tulane; Tire Pros Invitational 7th place game	W 67–62	2–2	20 – Walton	10 – Woods	3 – Geist, Vanleer	HP Field House; Orlando, FL
11/26/2016*; 2:00 pm		Northwestern State	W 84–60	3–2	19 – Walton	7 – Jackson	8 – Phillips	Mizzou Arena (4,669); Columbia, MO
11/28/2016*; 7:00 pm		North Carolina Central	L 52–62	3–3	17 – Phillips	6 – Geist, Woods	1 – 8 tied	Mizzou Arena (4,123); Columbia, MO
12/03/2016*; 2:00 pm		Western Kentucky	W 59–56	4–3	18 – Hughes	8 – Phillips, Woods	5 – Phillips	Mizzou Arena (4,547); Columbia, MO
12/06/2016*; 7:00 pm		Miami (OH)	W 81–55	5–3	19 – Puryear	10 – Woods	6 – Phillips	Mizzou Arena (3,515); Columbia, MO
12/10/2016*; 11:00 am, ESPN2		No. 20 Arizona	L 60–79	5–4	11 – Puryear	7 – Puryear	4 – Vanleer	Mizzou Arena (10,151); Columbia, MO
12/17/2016*; 2:30 pm, SECN		Eastern Illinois	L 64–67	5–5	9 – Jackson, Walton	6 – Puryear	7 – Phillips	Mizzou Arena (9,618); Columbia, MO
12/21/2016*; 6:00 pm, ESPNU		vs. Illinois; Braggin' Rights	L 66–75	5–6	17 – Puryear	9 – Puryear	3 – Vanleer	Scottrade Center (12,409); St. Louis, MO
12/29/2016*; 7:00 pm		Lipscomb	L 76–81	5–7	18 – Geist	13 – Barnett	4 – Phillips	Mizzou Arena (10,121); Columbia, MO
SEC regular season
01/04/2017; 8:00 pm, SECN		LSU	L 77–88	5–8 (0–1)	18 – Barnett	7 – Phillips, Puryear	8 – Phillips	Mizzou Arena (9,404); Columbia, MO
01/07/2017; 12:00 pm, SECN		at Georgia	L 66–71	5–9 (0–2)	20 – Phillips	9 – Barnett	3 – Barnett	Stegeman Coliseum (8,635); Athens, GA
01/10/2017; 6:00 pm, SECN		Auburn	L 72–77	5–10 (0–3)	20 – Barnett	13 – Walton	6 – Phillips	Mizzou Arena (9,688); Columbia, MO
01/14/2017; 5:00 pm, SECN		at Arkansas	L 73–92	5–11 (0–4)	14 – Barnett	6 – Barnett, Nikko	4 – Phillips	Bud Walton Arena (15,424); Fayetteville, AR
01/18/2017; 6:00 pm, ESPNU		at Alabama	L 56–68	5–12 (0–5)	16 – Phillips	6 – Puryear	7 – Phillips	Coleman Coliseum (10,347); Tuscaloosa, AL
01/21/2017; 6:00 pm, SECN		Ole Miss	L 71–75	5–13 (0–6)	26 – Puryear	11 – Woods	10 – Phillips	Mizzou Arena (10,378); Columbia, MO
01/25/2017; 6:00 pm, SECN		at Mississippi State	L 74–89	5–14 (0–7)	18 – Barnett, Geist	8 – Barnett	4 – Phillips	Humphrey Coliseum (7,101); Starkville, MS
01/28/2017; 7:30 pm, SECN		No. 23 South Carolina	L 53–63	5–15 (0–8)	18 – Woods	8 – Puryear, Woods	3 – Phillips	Mizzou Arena (10,190); Columbia, MO
02/02/2017; 6:00 pm, ESPN2		at No. 24 Florida	L 54–93	5–16 (0–9)	14 – Phillips	4 – 4 tied	3 – Phillips	O'Connell Center (10,153); Gainesville, FL
02/04/2017; 5:00 pm, SECN		Arkansas	W 83–78	6–16 (1–9)	17 – Barnett	8 – Puryear	6 – Phillips	Mizzou Arena (8,211); Columbia, MO
02/08/2017; 7:30 pm, SECN		at Texas A&M	L 73–76	6–17 (1–10)	23 – Barnett	8 – Walton	7 – Phillips	Reed Arena (8,632); College Station, TX
02/11/2017; 2:30 pm, SECN		Vanderbilt	W 72–52	7–17 (2–10)	23 – Barnett	9 – Barnett	4 – VanLeer	Mizzou Arena (10,279); Columbia, MO
02/15/2017; 7:30 pm, SECN		Alabama	L 54–57	7–18 (2–11)	12 – Walton	12 – Barnett	3 – Walton	Mizzou Arena (5,991); Columbia, MO
02/18/2017; 12:00 pm, SECN		at Tennessee	L 70–90	7–19 (2–12)	18 – Phillips	6 – Nikko	3 – Phillips	Thompson–Boling Arena (14,680); Knoxville, TN
02/21/2017; 8:00 pm, SECN		No. 11 Kentucky	L 62–72	7–20 (2–13)	22 – Phillips	8 – Puryear	3 – Phillips	Mizzou Arena (11,574); Columbia, MO
02/25/2017; 2:30 pm, SECN		at Ole Miss	L 77–80	7–21 (2–14)	22 – Hughes	9 – Nikko	8 – Phillips	The Pavilion at Ole Miss (7,693); Oxford, MS
02/28/2017; 6:00 pm, SECN		Texas A&M	L 43–60	7–22 (2–15)	15 – Phillips	6 – Hughes	4 – Geist	Mizzou Arena (6,157); Columbia, MO
03/04/2017; 2:30 pm, SECN		at Auburn	L 78–89	7–23 (2–16)	19 – Puryear	8 – Puryear	5 – Phillips, Geist	Auburn Arena (7,659); Auburn, AL
SEC Tournament
03/08/2017; 8:30 pm, SECN	(14)	vs. (11) Auburn; First round	W 86–83 ^{OT}	8–23	30 – Puryear	7 – Puryear	7 – Geist	Bridgestone Arena (8,567); Nashville, TN
03/09/2017; 8:30 pm, SECN	(14)	vs. (6) Ole Miss; Second round	L 74–86	8–24	15 – Barnett, Puryear, Phillips	6 – Barnett	8 – Phillips	Bridgestone Arena (13,112); Nashville, TN
*Non-conference game. ^{#}Rankings from AP Poll. (#) Tournament seedings in parentheses. All times are in Central Time.
