= 2016–17 Tennessee Volunteers basketball team =

American college basketball season

2016–17 Tennessee Volunteers basketball
- Conference: Southeastern Conference
- Record: 16–16 (8–10 SEC)
- Head coach: Rick Barnes (2nd season)
- Assistant coaches: Rob Lanier; Desmond Oliver; Michael Schwartz
- Home arena: Thompson–Boling Arena

2016–17 Southeastern Conference men's basketball standings
	Conf.				Overall
Team	W		L	PCT	W		L	PCT
No. 6 Kentucky †	16	–	2	.889	32	–	6	.842
No. 20 Florida	14	–	4	.778	27	–	9	.750
Arkansas	12	–	6	.667	26	–	10	.722
South Carolina	12	–	6	.667	26	–	11	.703
Ole Miss	10	–	8	.556	22	–	14	.611
Alabama	10	–	8	.556	19	–	15	.559
Vanderbilt	10	–	8	.556	19	–	16	.543
Georgia	9	–	9	.500	19	–	15	.559
Texas A&M	8	–	10	.444	16	–	15	.516
Tennessee	8	–	10	.444	16	–	16	.500
Auburn	7	–	11	.389	18	–	14	.563
Mississippi State	6	–	12	.333	16	–	16	.500
LSU	2	–	16	.111	10	–	21	.323
Missouri	2	–	16	.111	8	–	24	.250
† 2017 SEC tournament winner Rankings from AP poll

The 2016–17 Tennessee Volunteers basketball team represented the University of Tennessee in the 2016–17 NCAA Division I men's basketball season. The Volunteers were led by second-year head coach Rick Barnes. The team played its home games at Thompson–Boling Arena in Knoxville, Tennessee, as a member of the Southeastern Conference. They finished the season 16–16, 8–10 in SEC play to finish in a tie for ninth place. They lost in the second round of the SEC tournament to Georgia.

== Previous season ==
The Vols posted a record of 15–19, 6–12 in SEC play, during the 2015–16 season and finished in 12th place. They advanced to the quarterfinals of the SEC tournament, where they lost to LSU.

== Roster turnover ==
=== Departures ===
Name	Number	Pos.	Height	Weight	Year	Hometown	Reason for departure	Ref
Kevin Punter	0	G	6'2"	190	Senior	Bronx, NY	Graduated	
Ray Kasongo	2	F	6'8"	245	Junior	Toronto, Ontario, Canada	Transferred to Iowa State	
Armani Moore	4	F	6'4"	217	Senior	Kennesaw, GA	Graduated	
Detrick Mostella	15	G	6'1"	179	Junior	Decatur, AL	Dismissed on January 10, 2017	
Derek Reese	23	F	6'7"	230	Senior	Orlando, FL	Graduated	
Devon Baulkman	34	G	6'4"	200	Senior	Bainbridge, GA	Graduated	

=== Incoming transfers ===
Name	Number	Pos.	Height	Weight	Year	Hometown	Notes	Ref
Lew Evans	21	F	6'9"	230	RS senior	Salt Lake City, UT	Graduate transfer from Utah State. Eligible to play immediately.	

== Recruiting ==
=== 2016 ===
College recruiting (2016)
Name	Hometown	School	Height	Weight	Commit date
Jordan Bowden; SG	Greenville, SC	22 Feet Academy	6 ft 5 in (1.96 m)	175 lb (79 kg)	Mar 22, 2016
Jordan Bowden; SG	Recruit ratings: Scout: Rivals: 247Sports: ESPN:				
Kwe Parker; SG	Wade, NC	Wesleyan Christian	6 ft 2 in (1.88 m)	172 lb (78 kg)	Nov 20, 2015
Kwe Parker; SG	Recruit ratings: Scout: Rivals: 247Sports: ESPN: (80)				
Grant Williams; PF/C	Charlotte, NC	Providence Day School	6 ft 7 in (2.01 m)	235 lb (107 kg)	Nov 13, 2015
Grant Williams; PF/C	Recruit ratings: Scout: Rivals: 247Sports: ESPN: (81)				
John Fulkerson; PF	Arden, NC	Christ School	6 ft 8 in (2.03 m)	190 lb (86 kg)	Nov 6, 2015
John Fulkerson; PF	Recruit ratings: Scout: Rivals: 247Sports: ESPN:				
Jalen Johnson; SF	High Point, NC	Wesleyan Christian	6 ft 6 in (1.98 m)	170 lb (77 kg)	Oct 11, 2015
Jalen Johnson; SF	Recruit ratings: Scout: Rivals: 247Sports: ESPN: (81)				
Jordan Bone; PG	Nashville, TN	Ensworth	6 ft 2 in (1.88 m)	165 lb (75 kg)	Sep 13, 2015
Jordan Bone; PG	Recruit ratings: Scout: Rivals: 247Sports: ESPN:				
Overall recruit ranking: Scout: NR Rivals: NR 247Sports: NR ESPN: NR
Note: In many cases, Scout, Rivals, 247Sports, On3, and ESPN may conflict in their listings of height and weight.; In these cases, the average was taken. ESPN grades are on a 100-point scale.; Sources: "Rivals.com 2016 Tennessee Basketball Commitments". Rivals.; "Tennessee Volunteers 2016 Player Commits". ESPN.; "2016 Team Ranking". Rivals.

=== 2017 ===
College recruiting (2017)
Name	Hometown	School	Height	Weight	Commit date
Yves Pons; SF	Paris, France	INSEP Paris	6 ft 6 in (1.98 m)	217 lb (98 kg)	Feb 28, 2017
Yves Pons; SF	Recruit ratings: Scout: 247Sports:				
Derrick Walker; PF	Kansas City, MO	Sunrise Christian Academy	6 ft 8 in (2.03 m)	255 lb (116 kg)	Feb 2, 2017
Derrick Walker; PF	Recruit ratings: Scout: Rivals: 247Sports: ESPN: (80)				
Zach Kent; C	Middletown, DE	Blair Academy	6 ft 10 in (2.08 m)	235 lb (107 kg)	Oct 30, 2016
Zach Kent; C	Recruit ratings: Scout: Rivals: 247Sports: ESPN: (77)				
Overall recruit ranking: Scout: NR Rivals: NR 247Sports: NR ESPN: NR
Note: In many cases, Scout, Rivals, 247Sports, On3, and ESPN may conflict in their listings of height and weight.; In these cases, the average was taken. ESPN grades are on a 100-point scale.; Sources: "Rivals.com 2017 Tennessee Basketball Commitments". Rivals.; "2017 Team Ranking". Rivals.

== Roster ==
2016–17 Tennessee Volunteers men's basketball team
Players
Coaches

Pos.	#	Name	Height	Weight	Year	Previous school	Hometown
G	0	Jordan Bone	6 ft 1 in (1.85 m)	173 lb (78 kg)	Fr	The Ensworth School	Nashville, Tennessee
G	1	Lamonte Turner	6 ft 0 in (1.83 m)	187 lb (85 kg)	RS Fr	IMG Academy	Florence, Alabama
F	2	Grant Williams	6 ft 5 in (1.96 m)	234 lb (106 kg)	Fr	Providence Day School	Charlotte, North Carolina
G	3	Robert Hubbs III	6 ft 5 in (1.96 m)	207 lb (94 kg)	Sr	Dyer County High School	Newbern, Tennessee
G	4	Jacob Fleschman (W)	6 ft 1 in (1.85 m)	160 lb (73 kg)	Fr	Westlake High School	Austin, Texas
F	5	Admiral Schofield	6 ft 4 in (1.93 m)	238 lb (108 kg)	So	Zion-Benton Township High School	Zion, Illinois
F	10	John Fulkerson (injured)	6 ft 7 in (2.01 m)	203 lb (92 kg)	Fr	Christ School	Kingsport, Tennessee
F	11	Kyle Alexander	6 ft 10 in (2.08 m)	218 lb (99 kg)	So	Orangeville Prep	Milton, Ontario, Canada
G	12	Kwe Parker	6 ft 0 in (1.83 m)	181 lb (82 kg)	Fr	Wesleyan Christian Academy	Fayetteville, North Carolina
G	13	Jalen Johnson (redshirt)	6 ft 5 in (1.96 m)	177 lb (80 kg)	Fr	Wesleyan Christian Academy	Durham, North Carolina
F	21	Lew Evans	6 ft 7 in (2.01 m)	235 lb (107 kg)	RS Sr	Utah State	Salt Lake City, Utah
G	23	Jordan Bowden	6 ft 3 in (1.91 m)	180 lb (82 kg)	Fr	Carter High School	Knoxville, Tennessee
G	24	Lucas Campbell (W)	6 ft 2 in (1.88 m)	178 lb (81 kg)	So	Christian Academy of Knoxville	Knoxville, Tennessee
G	25	Shembari Phillips	6 ft 3 in (1.91 m)	192 lb (87 kg)	So	Joseph Wheeler High School	Atlanta, Georgia
G	32	Brad Woodson (W)	6 ft 0 in (1.83 m)	178 lb (81 kg)	So	Riverdale High School	Murfreesboro, Tennessee

Head coach

- Rick Barnes

Assistant coach(es)

- Rob Lanier
- Desmond Oliver
- Michael Schwartz

Legend

- (C) Team captain
- (S) Suspended
- (I) Ineligible
- (W) Walk-on
- Injured
- Current redshirt

Roster

=== Depth chart ===
Pos.	Starting 5	Bench 1	Bench 2	Bench 3
F/C	Lew Evans	Kyle Alexander		John Fulkerson (INJ)
F	Grant Williams			Jalen Johnson (RS)
G/F	Robert Hubbs	Admiral Schofield		Lucas Campbell (W)
G	Jordan Bowden	Shembari Phillips		Jacob Fleschman (W)
PG	Lamonte' Turner	Jordan Bone	Kwe Parker	Brad Woodson (W)

== Schedule ==
Tennessee opened the season against the Chattanooga Mocs. Additionally, they played games at East Tennessee State, host Georgia Tech, and North Carolina. The Vols took part in the 2016 Maui Invitational tournament, where they finished 7th. Tennessee hosted Kansas State in the Big 12/SEC Challenge. Tennessee released its full non-conference schedule on June 24. The 2016 Maui Invitational Tournament bracket was announced on July 19.

Date time, TV	Rank^{#}	Opponent^{#}	Result	Record	High points	High rebounds	High assists	Site (attendance) city, state
Exhibition
Nov. 3*; 7:00 PM		Slippery Rock	W 83–48		14 – Hubbs	5 – Schofield	4 – Tied	Thompson–Boling Arena; Knoxville, TN
Regular season
Nov. 11*; 7:00 PM		Chattanooga; Maui Invitational opening round	L 69–82	0–1	21 – Bone	10 – Williams	2 – Hubbs	Thompson–Boling Arena (14,483); Knoxville, TN
Nov. 15*; 7:00 PM, SECN		Appalachian State	W 103–94	1–1	16 – Hubbs	7 – Alexander	8 – Bone	Thompson–Boling Arena (11,758); Knoxville, TN
Nov. 21*; 2:30 PM, ESPN2		vs. No. 16 Wisconsin; Maui Invitational quarterfinals	L 62–74	1–2	16 – Phillips	6 – Alexander	2 – Tied	Lahaina Civic Center (2,400); Maui, HI
Nov. 22*; 1:30 PM, ESPN2		vs. No. 12 Oregon; Maui Invitational Consolation 2nd Round	L 65–69 ^{OT}	1–3	22 – Mostella	10 – Fulkerson	2 – Tied	Lahaina Civic Center (2,400); Maui, HI
Nov. 23*; 2:15 PM, ESPNU		vs. Chaminade; Maui Invitational 7th Place Game	W 95–81	2–3	28 – Hubbs	8 – Fulkerson	4 – Turner	Lahaina Civic Center (2,400); Maui, HI
Dec. 3*; 1:00 PM, SECN+		Georgia Tech	W 81–58	3–3	14 – Tied	8 – Fulkerson	7 – Phillips	Thompson–Boling Arena (12,634); Knoxville, TN
Dec. 6*; 5:00 PM		Presbyterian	W 90–50	4–3	24 – Turner	8 – Williams	4 – Phillips	Thompson–Boling Arena (11,547); Knoxville, TN
Dec. 11*; 5:00 PM, ESPN		at No. 7 North Carolina	L 71–73	4–4	21 – Hubbs	6 – Tied	2 – Tied	Dean Smith Center (18,745); Chapel Hill, NC
Dec. 13*; 7:00 PM, SECN		Tennessee Tech	W 74–68	5–4	25 – Hubbs	7 – Hubbs	5 – Phillips	Thompson–Boling Arena (11,524); Knoxville, TN
Dec. 15*; 7:00 PM		Lipscomb	W 92–77	6–4	30 – Williams	10 – Hubbs	5 – Phillips	Thompson–Boling Arena (11,893); Knoxville, TN
Dec. 18*; 4:00 PM, ESPN2		vs. No. 8 Gonzaga; Nashville Showcase	L 76–86	6–5	17 – Mostella	7 – Williams	4 – Tied	Bridgestone Arena (13,784); Nashville, TN
Dec. 22*; 7:00 PM		at East Tennessee State	W 72–68	7–5	25 – Mostella	9 – Williams	4 – Parker	Freedom Hall Civic Center (6,149); Johnson City, TN
Dec. 29; 9:00 PM, SECN		at Texas A&M	W 73–63	8–5 (1–0)	14 – Turner	6 – Phillips	4 – Tied	Reed Arena (9,199); College Station, TX
Jan. 3; 6:30 PM, SECN		Arkansas	L 68–72	8–6 (1–1)	21 – Hubbs	11 – Williams	3 – Bone	Thompson–Boling Arena (13,002); Knoxville, TN
Jan. 7; 5:15 PM, ESPN2		at No. 24 Florida	L 70–83	8–7 (1–2)	18 – Schofield	10 – Schofield	4 – Turner	O'Connell Center (10,843); Gainesville, FL
Jan. 11; 6:30 PM, SECN		South Carolina	L 60–70	8–8 (1–3)	15 – Williams	7 – Hubbs	3 – Schofield	Thompson–Boling Arena (13,794); Knoxville, TN
Jan. 14; 8:30 PM, SECN		at Vanderbilt	W 87–75	9–8 (2–3)	23 – Bone	9 – Williams	5 – Bone	Memorial Gymnasium (12,235); Nashville, TN
Jan. 17; 9:00 PM, SECN		at Ole Miss	L 69–80	9–9 (2–4)	15 – Turner	8 – Tied	5 – Turner	The Pavilion at Ole Miss (6,085); Oxford, MS
Jan. 21; 6:00 PM, SECN		Mississippi State	W 91–74	10–9 (3–4)	19 – Hubbs	9 – Evans	6 – Turner	Thompson–Boling Arena (13,917); Knoxville, TN
Jan. 24; 9:00 PM, ESPN		No. 5 Kentucky; Rivalry	W 82–80	11–9 (4–4)	25 – Hubbs	7 – Tied	6 – Williams	Thompson–Boling Arena (19,349); Knoxville, TN
Jan. 28*; 2:00 PM, ESPN2		Kansas State; Big 12/SEC Challenge	W 70–58	12–9	17 – Williams	9 – Alexander	5 – Tied	Thompson–Boling Arena (14,398); Knoxville, TN
Jan. 31; 9:00 PM, SECN		at Auburn	W 87–77	13–9 (5–4)	18 – Schofield	9 – Hubbs	5 – Hubbs	Auburn Arena (7,525); Auburn, AL
Feb. 4; 3:30 PM, SECN		at Mississippi State	L 59–64	13–10 (5–5)	13 – Bone	8 – Bone	3 – Hubbs	Humphrey Coliseum (7,581); Starkville, MS
Feb. 8; 6:30 PM, SECN		Ole Miss	W 75–66	14–10 (6–5)	18 – Tied	7 – Tied	5 – Bone	Thompson–Boling Arena (12,209); Knoxville, TN
Feb. 11; 4:00 PM, ESPNU		Georgia	L 75–76	14–11 (6–6)	30 – Williams	9 – Alexander	5 – Turner	Thompson–Boling Arena (15,637); Knoxville, TN
Feb. 14; 7:00 PM, ESPN		at No. 13 Kentucky; Rivalry	L 58–83	14–12 (6–7)	17 – Schofield	7 – Schofield	2 – Tied	Rupp Arena (24,391); Lexington, KY
Feb. 18; 1:00 PM, SECN		Missouri	W 90–70	15–12 (7–7)	25 – Williams	8 – Hubbs	6 – Bone	Thompson-Boling Arena (14,680); Knoxville, TN
Feb. 22; 6:30 PM, SECN		Vanderbilt	L 56–67	15–13 (7–8)	16 – Hubbs	10 – Williams	2 – Tied	Thompson–Boling Arena (12,713); Knoxville, TN
Feb. 25; 1:00 PM, SECN		at South Carolina	L 55–82	15–14 (7–9)	16 – Hubbs	8 – Tied	1 – Tied	Colonial Life Arena (16,117); Columbia, SC
Mar. 1; 7:00 PM, SECN		at LSU	L 82–92	15–15 (7–10)	16 – Williams	14 – Williams	3 – Turner	Maravich Center (6,557); Baton Rouge, LA
Mar. 4; 1:00 PM, SECN		Alabama	W 59–54	16–15 (8–10)	16 – Williams	10 – Williams	6 – Bowden	Thompson–Boling Arena (14,652); Knoxville, TN
SEC Tournament
Mar. 9; 1:00 PM, SECN	(9)	vs. (8) Georgia; Second Round	L 57–59	16–16	14 – Bone	11 – Schofield	5 – Bone	Bridgestone Arena (11,973); Nashville, TN
*Non-conference game. ^{#}Rankings from AP Poll. (#) Tournament seedings in parentheses. All times are in Eastern Time.
