= 2016–17 Vanderbilt Commodores men's basketball team =

American college basketball season

2016–17 Vanderbilt Commodores men's basketball

NCAA tournament, First Round
- Conference: Southeastern Conference
- Record: 19–16 (10–8 SEC)
- Head coach: Bryce Drew (1st season)
- Assistant coaches: Roger Powell, Jr.; Jake Diebler; Casey Shaw
- Home arena: Memorial Gymnasium

2016–17 Southeastern Conference men's basketball standings
	Conf.				Overall
Team	W		L	PCT	W		L	PCT
No. 6 Kentucky †	16	–	2	.889	32	–	6	.842
No. 20 Florida	14	–	4	.778	27	–	9	.750
Arkansas	12	–	6	.667	26	–	10	.722
South Carolina	12	–	6	.667	26	–	11	.703
Ole Miss	10	–	8	.556	22	–	14	.611
Alabama	10	–	8	.556	19	–	15	.559
Vanderbilt	10	–	8	.556	19	–	16	.543
Georgia	9	–	9	.500	19	–	15	.559
Texas A&M	8	–	10	.444	16	–	15	.516
Tennessee	8	–	10	.444	16	–	16	.500
Auburn	7	–	11	.389	18	–	14	.563
Mississippi State	6	–	12	.333	16	–	16	.500
LSU	2	–	16	.111	10	–	21	.323
Missouri	2	–	16	.111	8	–	24	.250
† 2017 SEC tournament winner Rankings from AP poll

The 2016–17 Vanderbilt Commodores men's basketball team represented Vanderbilt University in the 2016–17 NCAA Division I men's basketball season. This was Bryce Drew's first year as the Vanderbilt head coach. The Commodores played their home games at Memorial Gymnasium in Nashville, Tennessee as members of the Southeastern Conference. They finished the season 19–16, 10–8 in SEC play to finish in a three-way tie for fifth place. They defeated Texas A&M and Florida in the SEC tournament before losing in the semifinals to Arkansas. They received an at-large bid to the NCAA tournament where they lost in the First Round to Northwestern. Vanderbilt entered the NCAA Tournament with 15 losses, the most ever by any at-large team.

== Previous season ==
The Commodores finished the 2015–16 season 19–14, 11–7 in SEC play to finish in a three-way tie for third place. They lost in the second round of the SEC tournament to Tennessee. They received an at-large bid to the NCAA tournament where they lost in the First Four to Wichita State.

On March 27, 2016, head coach Kevin Stallings resigned to become the head coach at Pittsburgh. Shortly thereafter, the school hired Valparaiso head coach Bryce Drew as head coach.

== Offseason ==
=== Departures ===
Name	Number	Pos.	Height	Weight	Year	Hometown	Notes
Wade Baldwin IV	4	G	6'3"	194	Sophomore	Belle Meade, NJ	Declare for 2016 NBA draft
Nathan Watkins	10	G	6'5"	186	Senior	Brentwood, TN	Graduated
Carter Josephs	14	G	6'0"	180	Senior	San Antonio, TX	Graduated
Semir Sehic	21	F	6'9"	247	Freshman	Atlanta, GA	Transferred to Tulane
Damian Jones	30	C	7'0"	245	Junior	Baton Rouge, LA	Declare for 2016 NBA draft
Josh Henderson	40	C	7'0"	237	RS Senior	Roanoke, VA	Graduated

=== Incoming transfers ===
Name	Number	Pos.	Height	Weight	Year	Hometown	Previous School
Larry Austin, Jr.	14	G	6'2"	174	Junior	Springfield, IL	Transferred from Xavier. Under NCAA transfer rules, Austin, Jr. will have to sit out for the 2016–17 season. Will have two years of remaining eligibility.

=== 2016 recruiting class ===
College recruiting information
Name	Hometown	School	Height	Weight	Commit date
Payton Willis #42 SG	Fayetteville, AR	Fayetteville High School	6 ft 3 in (1.91 m)	165 lb (75 kg)	Aug 5, 2015
Payton Willis #42 SG	Recruit ratings: Scout: Rivals: 247Sports: ESPN:				
Clevon Brown; PF	San Antonio, TX	Churchill High School	6 ft 8 in (2.03 m)	200 lb (91 kg)	Sep 29, 2015
Clevon Brown; PF	Recruit ratings: Scout: Rivals: 247Sports: ESPN:				
Overall recruit ranking: Scout: 23 Rivals: 30
Note: In many cases, Scout, Rivals, 247Sports, On3, and ESPN may conflict in their listings of height and weight.; In these cases, the average was taken. ESPN grades are on a 100-point scale.; Sources: "Vanderbilt 2016 Basketball Commitments". Rivals.; "2016 Vanderbilt Basketball Commits". Scout.; "ESPN". ESPN.; "Scout.com Team Recruiting Rankings". Scout.; "2016 Team Ranking". Rivals.

=== 2017 recruiting class ===
College recruiting information (2017)
Name	Hometown	School	Height	Weight	Commit date
Saben Lee; PG	Tempe, AZ	Corona Del Sol High School	6 ft 2 in (1.88 m)	175 lb (79 kg)	Jun 13, 2016
Saben Lee; PG	Recruit ratings: Scout: Rivals: 247Sports: ESPN:				
Maxwell Evans; CG	Bellaire, TX	Bellaire High School	6 ft 2 in (1.88 m)	165 lb (75 kg)	Aug 7, 2016
Maxwell Evans; CG	Recruit ratings: Scout: Rivals: 247Sports: ESPN:				
Ejike Obinna; C	Ashburn, VA	Virginia Academy	6 ft 9 in (2.06 m)	220 lb (100 kg)	Sep 25, 2016
Ejike Obinna; C	Recruit ratings: Scout: Rivals: 247Sports: ESPN:				
Overall recruit ranking: Scout: 23 Rivals: 30
Note: In many cases, Scout, Rivals, 247Sports, On3, and ESPN may conflict in their listings of height and weight.; In these cases, the average was taken. ESPN grades are on a 100-point scale.; Sources: "Vanderbilt 2017 Basketball Commitments". Rivals.; "2017 Vanderbilt Basketball Commits". Scout.; "ESPN". ESPN.; "Scout.com Team Recruiting Rankings". Scout.; "2017 Team Ranking". Rivals.

== Roster ==
2016–17 Vanderbilt Commodores men's basketball team
Players
Coaches

Pos.	#	Name	Height	Weight	Year	Previous school	Hometown
G	1	Payton Willis	6 ft 4 in (1.93 m)	182 lb (83 kg)	Fr	Fayetteville High School	Fayetteville, Arkansas
G/F	2	Joe Toye	6 ft 7 in (2.01 m)	208 lb (94 kg)	So	Whitney M. Young Magnet High School	Chicago, Illinois
F	3	Luke Kornet	7 ft 1 in (2.16 m)	250 lb (113 kg)	Sr	Liberty Christian School	Lantana, Texas
G/F	5	Matthew Fisher-Davis	6 ft 5 in (1.96 m)	185 lb (84 kg)	Jr	David W. Butler High School	Charlotte, North Carolina
F	11	Jeff Roberson	6 ft 6 in (1.98 m)	224 lb (102 kg)	Jr	The Kinkaid School	Houston, Texas
C	12	Djery Baptiste	6 ft 10 in (2.08 m)	240 lb (109 kg)	RS Fr	Prestonwood Christian Academy	Gonaïves, Haiti
G	13	Riley LaChance	6 ft 2 in (1.88 m)	192 lb (87 kg)	Jr	Brookfield Central High School	Brookfield, Wisconsin
G	14	Larry Austin, Jr. (I) (redshirt)	6 ft 2 in (1.88 m)	175 lb (79 kg)	Jr	Xavier	Springfield, Illinois
F	15	Clevon Brown	6 ft 8 in (2.03 m)	219 lb (99 kg)	Fr	Winston Churchill High School	San Antonio, Texas
G	24	Nolan Cressler	6 ft 4 in (1.93 m)	210 lb (95 kg)	RS Sr	Cornell	Pittsburgh, Pennsylvania

Head coach

- Bryce Drew (Valparaiso)

Assistant coach(es)

- Roger Powell, Jr. (Illinois)
- Jake Diebler (Valparaiso)
- Casey Shaw (Toledo)

Legend

- (C) Team captain
- (S) Suspended
- (I) Ineligible
- (W) Walk-on
- Injured
- Current redshirt

Roster

== Schedule and results ==
Date time, TV	Rank^{#}	Opponent^{#}	Result	Record	Site (attendance) city, state
Regular season
11/11/2016*; 5:30 pm, CBSSN		vs. Marquette; Veterans Classic	L 71–95	0–1	Alumni Hall (4,116); Annapolis, MD
11/15/2016*; 8:00 pm, SECN		Belmont	W 80–66	1–1	Memorial Gymnasium (9,116); Nashville, TN
11/18/2016*; 7:00 pm		Norfolk State; Las Vegas Invitational	W 75–52	2–1	Memorial Gymnasium (8,205); Nashville, TN
11/21/2016*; 8:00 pm, SECN		Bucknell; Las Vegas Invitational	L 72–75	2–2	Memorial Gymnasium (8,243); Nashville, TN
11/24/2016*; 7:00 pm, FS1		vs. Butler; Las Vegas Invitational semifinals	L 66–76	2–3	Orleans Arena; Paradise, NV
11/25/2016*; 7:00 pm, FS1		vs. Santa Clara; Las Vegas Invitational 3rd place game	W 76–66	3–3	Orleans Arena; Paradise, NV
11/29/2016*; 7:00 pm		Tennessee State	W 83–59	4–3	Memorial Gymnasium (8,445); Nashville, TN
12/03/2016*; 7:00 pm		vs. Minnesota; Sioux Falls Showcase	L 52–56	4–4	Sanford Pentagon (3,250); Sioux Falls, SD
12/06/2016*; 7:00 pm, SECN		High Point	W 90–63	5–4	Memorial Gymnasium (8,288); Nashville, TN
12/08/2016*; 6:30 pm, CBSSN		at Middle Tennessee	L 48–71	5–5	Murphy Center (9,606); Murfreesboro, TN
12/17/2016*; 7:30 pm, SECN		Chattanooga	W 76–74	6–5	Memorial Gymnasium (9,376); Nashville, TN
12/21/2016*; 6:00 pm, TWCSC		at Dayton	L 63–68	6–6	University of Dayton Arena (12,828); Dayton, OH
12/29/2016; 8:00 pm, ESPNU		at LSU	W 96–89	7–6 (1–0)	Maravich Center (7,853); Baton Rouge, LA
01/04/2017; 6:00 pm, SECN		Auburn	W 80–61	8–6 (2–0)	Memorial Gymnasium (9,918); Nashville, TN
01/07/2017; 6:00 pm, ESPNU		at Alabama	L 56–59	8–7 (2–1)	Coleman Coliseum (11,256); Tuscaloosa, AL
01/10/2017; 6:00 pm, ESPN		No. 6 Kentucky	L 81–87	8–8 (2–2)	Memorial Gymnasium (12,707); Nashville, TN
01/14/2017; 7:30 pm, SECN		Tennessee	L 75–87	8–9 (2–3)	Memorial Gymnasium (12,235); Nashville, TN
01/17/2017; 8:00 pm, ESPNU		at Georgia	L 78–86	8–10 (2–4)	Stegeman Coliseum (7,480); Athens, GA
01/21/2017; 11:00 am, CBS		at No. 19 Florida	W 68–66	9–10 (3–4)	O'Connell Center (10,523); Gainesville, FL
01/24/2017; 7:30 pm, SECN		Arkansas	L 70–71	9–11 (3–5)	Memorial Gymnasium (9,408); Nashville, TN
01/28/2017*; 3:00 pm, ESPN2		Iowa State; Big 12/SEC Challenge	W 84–78	10–11	Memorial Gymnasium (9,851); Nashville, TN
01/31/2017; 8:00 pm, ESPNU		at Texas A&M	W 68–54	11–11 (4–5)	Reed Arena (7,508); College Station, TX
02/04/2017; 2:00 pm, ESPNU		Ole Miss	L 74–81	11–12 (4–6)	Memorial Gymnasium (9,287); Nashville, TN
02/07/2017; 7:30 pm, SECN		at Arkansas	W 72–59	12–12 (5–6)	Bud Walton Arena (8,036); Fayetteville, AR
02/11/2017; 2:30 pm, SECN		at Missouri	L 52–72	12–13 (5–7)	Mizzou Arena (6,845); Columbia, MO
02/16/2017; 6:00 pm, ESPN2		Texas A&M	W 72–67	13–13 (6–7)	Memorial Gymnasium (8,976); Nashville, TN
02/18/2017; 7:30 pm, SECN		No. 21 South Carolina	W 71–62	14–13 (7–7)	Memorial Gymnasium (10,471); Nashville, TN
02/22/2017; 5:30 pm, SECN		at Tennessee	W 67–56	15–13 (8–7)	Thompson-Boling Arena (12,713); Knoxville, Tennessee
02/25/2017; 3:00 pm, ESPNU		Mississippi State	W 77–48	16–13 (9–7)	Memorial Gymnasium (9,212); Nashville, TN
02/28/2017; 8:00 pm, ESPN		at No. 9 Kentucky	L 67–73	16–14 (9–8)	Rupp Arena (24,036); Lexington, KY
03/04/2017; 1:00 pm, ESPN		No. 12 Florida	W 73–71	17–14 (10–8)	Memorial Gymnasium (10,431); Nashville, TN
SEC Tournament
03/09/2017; 5:00 pm, SECN	(7)	vs. (10) Texas A&M; Second Round	W 66–41	18–14	Bridgestone Arena (13,112); Nashville, TN
03/10/2017; 5:00 pm, SECN	(7)	vs. (2) No. 17 Florida; Quarterfinals	W 72–62 ^{OT}	19–14	Bridgestone Arena (14,227); Nashville, TN
03/11/2017; 2:00 pm, ESPN	(7)	vs. (3) Arkansas; Semifinals	L 62–76	19–15	Bridgestone Arena (19,196); Nashville, TN
NCAA tournament
03/16/2017*; 3:30 pm, TBS	(9 W)	vs. (8 W) Northwestern; First Round	L 66–68	19–16	Vivint Smart Home Arena (16,952); Salt Lake City, UT
*Non-conference game. ^{#}Rankings from AP Poll. (#) Tournament seedings in parentheses. W=West Region. All times are in Central Time.

== See also ==
- 2016–17 Vanderbilt Commodores women's basketball team
