= 2017 SEC men's basketball tournament =

- Classification: Division I
- Season: 2016–17
- Teams: 14
- Site: Bridgestone Arena; Nashville, Tennessee
- Champions: Kentucky (31st title)
- Winning coach: John Calipari (5th title)
- MVP: De'Aaron Fox (Kentucky)
- Television: ESPN and SEC Network

2016–17 Southeastern Conference men's basketball standings
| | Conf. | | | | Overall |
| Team | W | | L | PCT | W | | L | PCT |
|---|---|---|---|---|---|---|---|---|
| No. 6 Kentucky † | 16 | – | 2 | .889 | 32 | – | 6 | .842 |
| No. 20 Florida | 14 | – | 4 | .778 | 27 | – | 9 | .750 |
| Arkansas | 12 | – | 6 | .667 | 26 | – | 10 | .722 |
| South Carolina | 12 | – | 6 | .667 | 26 | – | 11 | .703 |
| Ole Miss | 10 | – | 8 | .556 | 22 | – | 14 | .611 |
| Alabama | 10 | – | 8 | .556 | 19 | – | 15 | .559 |
| Vanderbilt | 10 | – | 8 | .556 | 19 | – | 16 | .543 |
| Georgia | 9 | – | 9 | .500 | 19 | – | 15 | .559 |
| Texas A&M | 8 | – | 10 | .444 | 16 | – | 15 | .516 |
| Tennessee | 8 | – | 10 | .444 | 16 | – | 16 | .500 |
| Auburn | 7 | – | 11 | .389 | 18 | – | 14 | .563 |
| Mississippi State | 6 | – | 12 | .333 | 16 | – | 16 | .500 |
| LSU | 2 | – | 16 | .111 | 10 | – | 21 | .323 |
| Missouri | 2 | – | 16 | .111 | 8 | – | 24 | .250 |
† 2017 SEC tournament winner Rankings from AP poll

The 2017 Southeastern Conference men's basketball tournament is the postseason men's basketball tournament for the Southeastern Conference held at Bridgestone Arena in Nashville, Tennessee March 8–12, 2017.

== Seeds ==
| Seed | School | Conference record | Overall record | Tiebreaker |
|---|---|---|---|---|
| 1 | Kentucky^{‡†} | 16–2 | 26–5 | |
| 2 | Florida^{†} | 14–4 | 24–7 | |
| 3 | Arkansas^{†} | 12−6 | 23–8 | 1–0 vs. South Carolina |
| 4 | South Carolina^{†} | 12–6 | 22–9 | 0–1 vs. Arkansas |
| 5 | Alabama^{#} | 10–8 | 17−13 | 1–0 vs. Ole Miss, 1–0 vs. Vanderbilt |
| 6 | Ole Miss^{#} | 10–8 | 19–12 | 0–1 vs. Alabama, 1–0 vs. Vanderbilt |
| 7 | Vanderbilt^{#} | 10–8 | 17–14 | 0–1 vs. Alabama, 0–1 vs. Ole Miss |
| 8 | Georgia^{#} | 9–9 | 18–13 | |
| 9 | Tennessee^{#} | 8–10 | 16−15 | 1–0 vs. Texas A&M |
| 10 | Texas A&M^{#} | 8–10 | 16–14 | 0–1 vs. Tennessee |
| 11 | Auburn | 7–11 | 18–13 | |
| 12 | Mississippi State | 6–12 | 15–15 | |
| 13 | LSU | 2–16 | 10–20 | 1–0 vs. Missouri |
| 14 | Missouri | 2–16 | 7–23 | 0–1 vs. LSU |
‡ – SEC regular season champions, and tournament No. 1 seed. † – Received a double-bye in the conference tournament. # – Received a single-bye in the conference tournament. Overall records include all games played in the SEC Tournament.

== Schedule ==
| Game | Time* | Matchup^{#} | Television | Attendance |
First round – Wednesday, March 8
| 1 | 6:00 PM | #12 Mississippi State vs. #13 LSU | SEC Network | 8,567 |
| 2 | 8:30 PM | #11 Auburn vs. #14 Missouri | SEC Network | 8,567 |
Second round – Thursday, March 9
| 3 | 12:00 PM | #8 Georgia vs. #9 Tennessee | SEC Network | 11,973 |
| 4 | 2:30 PM | #5 Alabama vs. #12 Mississippi State | SEC Network | 11,973 |
| 5 | 6:00 PM | #7 Vanderbilt vs. #10 Texas A&M | SEC Network | 13,112 |
| 6 | 8:30 PM | #6 Ole Miss vs. #14 Missouri | SEC Network | 13,112 |
Quarterfinals – Friday, March 10
| 7 | 12:00 PM | #1 Kentucky vs. #8 Georgia | SEC Network | 18,130 |
| 8 | 2:30 PM | #4 South Carolina vs. #5 Alabama | SEC Network | 18,130 |
| 9 | 6:00 PM | #2 Florida vs. #7 Vanderbilt | SEC Network | 14,227 |
| 10 | 8:30 PM | #3 Arkansas vs. #6 Ole Miss | SEC Network | 14,227 |
Semifinals – Saturday, March 11
| 11 | 12:00 PM | #1 Kentucky vs #5 Alabama | ESPN | 19,196 |
| 12 | 2:30 PM | #7 Vanderbilt vs #3 Arkansas | ESPN | 19,196 |
Championship – Sunday, March 12
| 13 | 12:00 PM | #1 Kentucky vs #3 Arkansas | ESPN | 19,953 |
*Game times in CT. (Note: The United States began daylight saving time at 2:00 am on Sunday, March 12. As a result, times through the semifinal games are listed in Central Standard Time while the championship game is listed in Central Daylight Time.) # – Rankings denote tournament seed

== Bracket ==
The tournament took place March 8–12.

First round Wednesday, March 8 SECN
12 | Mississippi State | 79
13 | LSU | 52
11 | Auburn | 83
14 | Missouri | 86*

Second round Thursday, March 9 SECN
8 | Georgia | 59
9 | Tennessee | 57
5 | Alabama | 75
12 | Mississippi State | 55
7 | Vanderbilt | 66
10 | Texas A&M | 41
6 | Ole Miss | 86
14 | Missouri | 74

Quarterfinals; Friday, March 10; SECN
1 | Kentucky | 71
8 | Georgia | 60
4 | South Carolina | 53
5 | Alabama | 64
2 | Florida | 62
7 | Vanderbilt | 72*
3 | Arkansas | 73
6 | Ole Miss | 72

Semifinals; Saturday, March 11; ESPN
1 | Kentucky | 79
5 | Alabama | 74
7 | Vanderbilt | 62
3 | Arkansas | 76

Championship; Sunday, March 12; ESPN
1 | Kentucky | 82
3 | Arkansas | 65

* denotes overtime period

== See also ==
- 2017 SEC women's basketball tournament
