= 2016–17 LSU Tigers basketball team =

American college basketball season

2016–17 LSU Tigers basketball
- Conference: Southeastern Conference
- Record: 10–21 (2–16 SEC)
- Head coach: Johnny Jones (5th season)
- Assistant coaches: Robert Kirby; Brendan Suhr; Randy Livingston
- Home arena: Pete Maravich Assembly Center

2016–17 Southeastern Conference men's basketball standings
	Conf.				Overall
Team	W		L	PCT	W		L	PCT
No. 6 Kentucky †	16	–	2	.889	32	–	6	.842
No. 20 Florida	14	–	4	.778	27	–	9	.750
Arkansas	12	–	6	.667	26	–	10	.722
South Carolina	12	–	6	.667	26	–	11	.703
Ole Miss	10	–	8	.556	22	–	14	.611
Alabama	10	–	8	.556	19	–	15	.559
Vanderbilt	10	–	8	.556	19	–	16	.543
Georgia	9	–	9	.500	19	–	15	.559
Texas A&M	8	–	10	.444	16	–	15	.516
Tennessee	8	–	10	.444	16	–	16	.500
Auburn	7	–	11	.389	18	–	14	.563
Mississippi State	6	–	12	.333	16	–	16	.500
LSU	2	–	16	.111	10	–	21	.323
Missouri	2	–	16	.111	8	–	24	.250
† 2017 SEC tournament winner Rankings from AP poll

The 2016–17 LSU Tigers basketball team represented Louisiana State University during the 2016–17 NCAA Division I men's basketball season. The team's head coach was Johnny Jones, who was in his fifth season at LSU. They played their home games at the Pete Maravich Assembly Center in Baton Rouge, Louisiana, as a member of the Southeastern Conference. They finished the season 10–21, 2–16 in SEC play to finish in a tie for 13th place. They lost in the First Round of the SEC tournament to Mississippi State.

On March 10, head coach Johnny Jones was fired. He finished at LSU with a five-year record of 90–72. On March 20, LSU hired VCU head coach Will Wade as their next head coach.

== Previous season ==
The LSU Tigers finished the season 19–14, 11–7 in SEC play to finish in a three-way tie for third place. They defeated Tennessee in the quarterfinals of the 2016 SEC tournament to advance to the semifinals where they lost to Texas A&M. On March 13, the day after losing to Texas A&M by 33 points, they announced they would not participate in a postseason tournament.

== Offseason ==
=== Departures ===
Name	Number	Pos.	Height	Weight	Year	Hometown	Notes
Keith Hornsby	4	G	6'4"	210	RS Senior	Williamsburg, VA	Graduated
Josh Gray	5	G	6'1"	177	Senior	Lake Charles, LA	Graduated
Darcy Malone	22	C	7'0"	246	Junior	Canberra, Australia	Transferred to Cal State Fullerton
Ben Simmons	25	F	6'10"	240	Freshman	Melbourne, Australia	Declare for 2016 NBA draft
Tim Quarterman	55	G	6'6"	190	Junior	Savannah, GA	Declare for 2016 NBA draft

=== Incoming transfers ===
Name	Number	Pos.	Height	Weight	Year	Hometown	Previous School
Duop Reath	2	F	6'10"	220	Junior	South Sudan	Junior college transferred from Lee College
Branden Jenkins	10	G	6'4"	180	Junior	Maywood, IL	Junior college transferred from Lee College

=== Class of 2016 signees ===
College recruiting information
Name	Hometown	School	Height	Weight	Commit date
Skylar Mays #24 PG	Baton Rouge, LA	Findlay College Prep	6 ft 3 in (1.91 m)	180 lb (82 kg)	Aug 10, 2015
Skylar Mays #24 PG	Recruit ratings: Scout: Rivals: 247Sports: ESPN:				
Wayde Sims #43 PF	Baton Rouge, LA	University Laboratory School	6 ft 6 in (1.98 m)	210 lb (95 kg)	Jun 28, 2015
Wayde Sims #43 PF	Recruit ratings: Scout: Rivals: 247Sports: ESPN:				
Kieran Hayward; SG	Sydney, Australia	St. Joseph's College	6 ft 5 in (1.96 m)	185 lb (84 kg)	Nov 7, 2015
Kieran Hayward; SG	Recruit ratings: Scout: Rivals: 247Sports: ESPN:				
Overall recruit ranking:
Note: In many cases, Scout, Rivals, 247Sports, On3, and ESPN may conflict in their listings of height and weight.; In these cases, the average was taken. ESPN grades are on a 100-point scale.; Sources: "LSU 2016 Basketball Commitments". Rivals.; "2016 LSU Basketball Commits". Scout.; "ESPN". ESPN.; "Scout.com Team Recruiting Rankings". Scout.; "2016 Team Ranking". Rivals.

=== Class of 2017 signees ===
College recruiting information (2017)
Name	Hometown	School	Height	Weight	Commit date
Galen Alexander; SF	Lafayette, LA	Lafayette Christian Academy	6 ft 7 in (2.01 m)	220 lb (100 kg)	Jul 17, 2016
Galen Alexander; SF	Recruit ratings: Scout: Rivals: 247Sports: ESPN:				
Brandon Rachal; SG	Natchitoches, LA	Natchitoches Central High School	6 ft 6 in (1.98 m)	220 lb (100 kg)	Oct 12, 2016
Brandon Rachal; SG	Recruit ratings: Scout: Rivals: 247Sports: ESPN:				
Overall recruit ranking:
Note: In many cases, Scout, Rivals, 247Sports, On3, and ESPN may conflict in their listings of height and weight.; In these cases, the average was taken. ESPN grades are on a 100-point scale.; Sources: "LSU 2017 Basketball Commitments". Rivals.; "2017 LSU Basketball Commits". Scout.; "ESPN". ESPN.; "Scout.com Team Recruiting Rankings". Scout.; "2017 Team Ranking". Rivals.

== Roster ==
2016–17 LSU Tigers men's basketball team
Players
Coaches

Pos.	#	Name	Height	Weight	Year	Previous school	Hometown
G	0	Brandon Sampson	6 ft 5 in (1.96 m)	193 lb (88 kg)	So	Madison Preparatory Academy	Baton Rouge, Louisiana
F	1	Duop Reath	6 ft 10 in (2.08 m)	235 lb (107 kg)	Jr	Lee College	Perth, Australia
G	2	Antonio Blakeney	6 ft 4 in (1.93 m)	197 lb (89 kg)	So	Oak Ridge High School	Sarasota, Florida
C	3	Elbert Robinson III	7 ft 1 in (2.16 m)	290 lb (132 kg)	Jr	Lakeview Centennial High School	Garland, Texas
G	4	Skylar Mays	6 ft 4 in (1.93 m)	205 lb (93 kg)	Fr	Findlay Prep	Baton Rouge, Louisiana
G	5	Kieran Hayward	6 ft 4 in (1.93 m)	195 lb (88 kg)	Fr	St Joseph's College	Sydney, Australia
G	10	Branden Jenkins	6 ft 4 in (1.93 m)	180 lb (82 kg)	Jr	Lee College	Maywood, Illinois
G	11	Jalyn Patterson	6 ft 1 in (1.85 m)	191 lb (87 kg)	Jr	Montverde Academy	Atlanta, Georgia
G	12	Marshall Graves (W)	6 ft 3 in (1.91 m)	190 lb (86 kg)	Fr	Louisiana State University Laboratory School	Ponchatoula, Louisiana
G	15	Reed Vial (W)	6 ft 3 in (1.91 m)	190 lb (86 kg)	So	Parkview Baptist High School	Baton Rouge, Louisiana
F	20	Brian Bridgewater	6 ft 5 in (1.96 m)	282 lb (128 kg)	Sr	Scotlandville Magnet High School	Baton Rouge, Louisiana
F	21	Aaron Epps	6 ft 10 in (2.08 m)	220 lb (100 kg)	Jr	Tioga High School	Ball, Louisiana
F	32	Craig Victor II	6 ft 9 in (2.06 m)	235 lb (107 kg)	RS Jr	Arizona	New Orleans, Louisiana
F	44	Wayde Sims	6 ft 6 in (1.98 m)	222 lb (101 kg)	Fr	Louisiana State University Laboratory School	Baton Rouge, Louisiana
F	45	Brandon Eddlestone (W)	6 ft 8 in (2.03 m)	248 lb (112 kg)	Sr	Northshore High School	Slidell, Louisiana

Head coach

- Johnny Jones (LSU)

Assistant coach(es)

- David Patrick (Louisiana)
- Brendan Suhr (Montclair State)
- Al Pinkins (NC State)

Legend

- (C) Team captain
- (S) Suspended
- (I) Ineligible
- (W) Walk-on
- Injured
- Current redshirt

Roster

== Schedule and results ==
Date time, TV	Rank^{#}	Opponent^{#}	Result	Record	High points	High rebounds	High assists	Site (attendance) city, state
Exhibition
11/07/2016*; 7:00 pm		Reinhardt	W 113–80		26 – Reath	13 – Reath	9 – Blakeney	Maravich Center (1,224); Baton Rouge, LA
Regular season
11/12/2016*; 1:00 pm		Wofford	W 91–69	1–0	23 – Reath	14 – Reath	6 – Mays	Maravich Center (6,690); Baton Rouge, LA
11/15/2016*; 7:00 pm		Southern Miss	W 78–61	2–0	26 – Blakeney	6 – Tied	6 – Tied	Maravich Center (6,942); Baton Rouge, LA
11/18/2016*; 7:00 pm		North Florida	W 78–70	3–0	20 – Blakeney	6 – Epps	8 – Patterson	Maravich Center (6,953); Baton Rouge, LA
11/23/2016*; 11:00 am, ESPN2		vs. Wichita State; Battle 4 Atlantis quarterfinals	L 47–82	3–1	12 – Blakeney	8 – Patterson	2 – Mays	Imperial Arena (1,604); Nassau, Bahamas
11/24/2016*; 8:30 pm, AXS TV		vs. Old Dominion; Battle 4 Atlantis 2nd round consolation	W 66–60	4–1	24 – Sampson	10 – Reath	2 – Tied	Imperial Arena (1,060); Nassau, Bahamas
11/25/2016*; 6:00 pm, AXS TV		vs. VCU; Battle 4 Atlantis 5th place game	L 74–85	4–2	14 – Tied	5 – Reath	7 – Patterson	Imperial Arena (1,201); Nassau, Bahamas
11/30/2016*; 8:00 pm, SECN		Houston	W 84–65	5–2	23 – Blakeney	9 – Victor	11 – Mays	Maravich Center (6,695); Baton Rouge, LA
12/13/2016*; 8:00 pm, SECN		North Carolina Central	W 70–66	6–2	27 – Blakeney	11 – Victor	5 – Patterson	Maravich Center (6,415); Baton Rouge, LA
12/17/2016*; 5:00 pm, SECN		Texas Southern	W 88–80	7–2	21 – Reath	10 – Victor	4 – Tied	Maravich Center (7,222); Baton Rouge, LA
12/19/2016*; 7:00 pm		College of Charleston	W 75–65	8–2	23 – Reath	10 – Tied	4 – Mays	Maravich Center (6,619); Baton Rouge, LA
12/22/2016*; 8:00 pm, ESPNU		at Wake Forest	L 76–110	8–3	21 – Blakeney	9 – Victor	3 – Mays	LJVM Coliseum (9,643); Winston-Salem, NC
12/29/2016; 8:00 pm, ESPNU		Vanderbilt	L 89–96	8–4 (0–1)	24 – Blakeney	7 – Blakeney	6 – Patterson	Maravich Center (7,853); Baton Rouge, LA
01/04/2017; 8:00 pm, SECN		at Missouri	W 88–77	9–4 (1–1)	24 – Blakeney	8 – Sampson, Sims	3 – 4 tied	Mizzou Arena (9,404); Columbia, MO
01/07/2017; 2:30 pm, SECN		Mississippi State	L 78–95	9–5 (1–2)	17 – Blakeney	13 – Reath	6 – Patterson	Maravich Center (7,626); Baton Rouge, LA
01/11/2017; 7:30 pm, SECN		at Texas A&M	L 62–92	9–6 (1–3)	17 – Blakeney	7 – Blakeney	4 – Tied	Reed Arena (8,033); College Station, TX
01/14/2017; 2:30 pm		Alabama	L 66–81	9–7 (1–4)	12 – Tied	9 – Reath	4 – Jenkins	Maravich Center (8,419); Baton Rouge, LA
01/18/2017; 7:30 pm, SECN		at Auburn	L 74–78	9–8 (1–5)	15 – Epps	13 – Epps	4 – Tied	Auburn Arena (8,327); Auburn, AL
01/21/2017; 7:30 pm, SECN		at Arkansas	L 86–99	9–9 (1–6)	22 – Mays	7 – Reath	6 – Mays	Bud Walton Arena (16,099); Fayetteville, AR
01/25/2017; 8:00 pm, SECN		No. 25 Florida	L 71–106	9–10 (1–7)	15 – Duop	9 – Blakeney	7 – Mays	Maravich Center (7,009); Baton Rouge, LA
01/28/2017*; 1:00 pm, ESPNU		at Texas Tech; Big 12/SEC Challenge	L 64–77	9–11 (1–7)	23 – Blakeney	11 – Reath	6 – Patterson	United Supermarkets Arena (11,056); Lubbock, TX
02/01/2017; 8:00 pm, SECN		No. 19 South Carolina	L 63–88	9–12 (1–8)	16 – Sampson	11 – Sims	3 – Blakeney	Maravich Center (6,478); Baton Rouge, LA
02/04/2017; 8:00 pm, ESPNU		Texas A&M	L 73–85	9–13 (1–9)	21 – Sampson	16 – Reath	4 – Mays	Maravich Center (7,059); Baton Rouge, LA
02/07/2017; 8:00 pm, ESPN		at No. 15 Kentucky	L 85–92	9–14 (1–10)	31 – Blakeney	4 – Patterson	5 – Blakeney	Rupp Arena (23,652); Lexington, KY
02/11/2017; 7:30 pm, SECN		Arkansas	L 70–78	9–15 (1–11)	21 – Blakeney	15 – Reath	5 – Mays	Maravich Center (7,132); Baton Rouge, LA
02/14/2017; 8:00 pm, SECN		at Ole Miss	L 76–96	9–16 (1–12)	29 – Blakeney	11 – Epps	3 – Mays	The Pavilion at Ole Miss (7,131); Oxford, MS
02/18/2017; 2:30 pm, SECN		at Alabama	L 72–90	9–17 (1–13)	28 – Blakeney	6 – Sampson	4 – Sampson	Coleman Coliseum (15,383); Tuscaloosa, AL
02/21/2017; 6:00 pm, SECN		Auburn	L 75–98	9–18 (1–14)	29 – Blakeney	8 – Sims	4 – Mays	Maravich Center (6,638); Baton Rouge, LA
02/25/2017; 5:00 pm, SECN		at Georgia	L 80–82	9–19 (1–15)	20 – Blakeney	6 – Sampson	6 – Sampson	Stegeman Coliseum (10,042); Athens, GA
03/01/2017; 6:00 pm, SECN		Tennessee	W 92–82	10–19 (2–15)	24 – Sampson	6 – Reath	4 – Mays	Maravich Center (6,557); Baton Rouge, LA
03/04/2017; 5:00 pm, SECN		at Mississippi State	L 76–88	10–20 (2–16)	15 – Blakeney	12 – Reath	6 – Patterson	Humphrey Coliseum (6,739); Starkville, MS
SEC Tournament
03/08/2017; 6:00 pm, SECN	(13)	vs. (12) Mississippi State; First Round	L 52–79	10–21	13 – Mays	7 – Patterson	4 – Mays	Bridgestone Arena (8,567); Nashville, TN
*Non-conference game. ^{#}Rankings from AP Poll. (#) Tournament seedings in parentheses. All times are in Central Time.

== See also ==
- 2016–17 LSU Lady Tigers basketball team
