= 2016–17 Georgia Bulldogs basketball team =

American college basketball season

2016–17 Georgia Bulldogs basketball

NIT, First Round
- Conference: Southeastern Conference
- Record: 19–15 (9–9 SEC)
- Head coach: Mark Fox (8th season)
- Assistant coaches: Philip Pearson; Jonas Hayes; Yasir Rosemond
- Home arena: Stegeman Coliseum

2016–17 Southeastern Conference men's basketball standings
	Conf.				Overall
Team	W		L	PCT	W		L	PCT
No. 6 Kentucky †	16	–	2	.889	32	–	6	.842
No. 20 Florida	14	–	4	.778	27	–	9	.750
Arkansas	12	–	6	.667	26	–	10	.722
South Carolina	12	–	6	.667	26	–	11	.703
Ole Miss	10	–	8	.556	22	–	14	.611
Alabama	10	–	8	.556	19	–	15	.559
Vanderbilt	10	–	8	.556	19	–	16	.543
Georgia	9	–	9	.500	19	–	15	.559
Texas A&M	8	–	10	.444	16	–	15	.516
Tennessee	8	–	10	.444	16	–	16	.500
Auburn	7	–	11	.389	18	–	14	.563
Mississippi State	6	–	12	.333	16	–	16	.500
LSU	2	–	16	.111	10	–	21	.323
Missouri	2	–	16	.111	8	–	24	.250
† 2017 SEC tournament winner Rankings from AP poll

The 2016–17 Georgia bulldogs basketball team represented the University of Georgia during the 2016–17 NCAA Division I men's basketball season. The team's head coach was Mark Fox, who was in his eighth season at UGA. They played their home games at Stegeman Coliseum as members of the Southeastern Conference. They finished the season 19–15, 9–9 in SEC play to finish in eighth place. They defeated Tennessee in the second round of the SEC tournament to advance to the quarterfinals where they lost to Kentucky. They were invited to the National Invitation Tournament where they lost in the First Round to Belmont.

== Previous season ==
The Bulldogs finished the season 20–14, 10–8 in SEC play to finish in a tie for sixth place. They defeated Mississippi State and South Carolina to advance to the semifinals of the SEC tournament where they lost to Kentucky. They were invited to the National Invitation Tournament where they defeated Belmont in the first round to advance to the second round where they lost to Saint Mary's.

== Departures ==
Name	Number	Pos.	Height	Weight	Year	Hometown	Notes
Charles Mann	4	G	6'5"	215	Senior	Alpharetta, GA	Graduated
Kenny Gaines	12	G	6'3"	200	Senior	Atlanta, GA	Graduated
Osahen Iduwe	15	C	6'10"	235	Sophomore	Benin City, Nigeria	Graduate transferred to Arkansas–Fort Smith

=== Incoming transfers ===
Name	Number	Pos.	Height	Weight	Year	Hometown	Previous School
Pape Diattai	5	F	6'7"	210	Junior	Dakar, Senegal	Junior college transferred from College of Southern Idaho
Christian Harrison	11	G/F	6'6"	200	Junior	Atlanta, GA	Under NCAA transfer rules, Harrison will have to sit out for the 2016–17 season. Will have two years of remaining eligibility. Will join the team as a preferred walk-on.

== Recruits class of 2016 ==
College recruiting information
Name	Hometown	School	Height	Weight	Commit date
Jordan Harris; SG	Donalsonville, GA	Seminole County Middle-High School	6 ft 5 in (1.96 m)	175 lb (79 kg)	Sep 9, 2014
Jordan Harris; SG	Recruit ratings: Scout: Rivals: 247Sports: ESPN:				
Tyree Crump; SG	Bainbridge, GA	Bainbridge High School	6 ft 2 in (1.88 m)	170 lb (77 kg)	Sep 9, 2014
Tyree Crump; SG	Recruit ratings: Scout: Rivals: 247Sports: ESPN:				
Overall recruit ranking: Scout: Not Ranked Rivals: Not Ranked ESPN: Not Ranked
Note: In many cases, Scout, Rivals, 247Sports, On3, and ESPN may conflict in their listings of height and weight.; In these cases, the average was taken. ESPN grades are on a 100-point scale.; Sources: "Georgia 2016 Basketball Commitments". Rivals.; "2016 Georgia Basketball Commits". Scout.; "ESPN". ESPN.; "Scout.com Team Recruiting Rankings". Scout.; "2016 Team Ranking". Rivals.

== Recruits class of 2017 ==
College recruiting information
Name	Hometown	School	Height	Weight	Commit date
Rayshaun Hammonds; PF	Norcross, GA	Norcross High School	6 ft 7 in (2.01 m)	190 lb (86 kg)	Nov 10, 2016
Rayshaun Hammonds; PF	Recruit ratings: Scout: Rivals: 247Sports: ESPN:				
Overall recruit ranking: Scout: Not Ranked Rivals: Not Ranked ESPN: Not Ranked
Note: In many cases, Scout, Rivals, 247Sports, On3, and ESPN may conflict in their listings of height and weight.; In these cases, the average was taken. ESPN grades are on a 100-point scale.; Sources: "Georgia 2016 Basketball Commitments". Rivals.; "2016 Georgia Basketball Commits". Scout.; "ESPN". ESPN.; "Scout.com Team Recruiting Rankings". Scout.; "2016 Team Ranking". Rivals.

== Roster ==
2016–17 Georgia Bulldogs men's basketball team
Players
Coaches

Pos.	#	Name	Height	Weight	Year	Previous school	Hometown
G	0	William Jackson II	6 ft 4 in (1.93 m)	185 lb (84 kg)	So	Athens Christian School	Athens, GA
F/C	1	Yante Maten	6 ft 8 in (2.03 m)	240 lb (109 kg)	Jr	Bloomfield Hills HS	Bloomfield Hills, MI
G	2	Jordan Harris	6 ft 4 in (1.93 m)	185 lb (84 kg)	Fr	Seminole County HS	Donalsonville, GA
G	3	Juwan Parker	6 ft 4 in (1.93 m)	205 lb (93 kg)	RS Jr	Washington HS	Tulsa, OK
G	4	Tyree Crump	6 ft 1 in (1.85 m)	180 lb (82 kg)	Fr	Bainbridge HS	Bainbridge, GA
F	5	Pape Diatta	6 ft 7 in (2.01 m)	220 lb (100 kg)	Jr	The Rock; College of Southern Idaho	Dakar, Senegal
G	11	Christian Harrison (W) (redshirt)	6 ft 4 in (1.93 m)	200 lb (91 kg)	Jr	Woodward Academy	Atlanta, GA
F	13	E'Torrion Wilridge	6 ft 6 in (1.98 m)	220 lb (100 kg)	So	Central Medical Magnet HS	Beaumont, TX
G	14	Brandon Young	5 ft 10 in (1.78 m)	160 lb (73 kg)	Sr	Marist HS	Atlanta, GA
F	24	Houston Kessler	6 ft 8 in (2.03 m)	230 lb (104 kg)	RS Sr	Landmark Christian	Newnan, GA
F	25	Kenny Paul Geno	6 ft 6 in (1.98 m)	210 lb (95 kg)	Sr	Booneville HS	Booneville, MS
G	30	J. J. Frazier	5 ft 10 in (1.78 m)	155 lb (70 kg)	Sr	Faith Baptist Christian	Glennville, GA
F	32	Mike Edwards	6 ft 9 in (2.06 m)	225 lb (102 kg)	So	John Glenn HS	Westland, MI
F	33	Connor O'Neill (W)	6 ft 6 in (1.98 m)	220 lb (100 kg)	So	Tilton School	Roswell, GA
F	34	Derek Ogbeide	6 ft 8 in (2.03 m)	245 lb (111 kg)	So	Pebblebrook HS	Atlanta, GA

Head coach

- Mark Fox (Eastern New Mexico)

Assistant coach(es)

- Philip Pearson (Alabama)
- Jonas Hayes (Georgia)
- Yasir Rosemond (Oregon)

Legend

- (C) Team captain
- (S) Suspended
- (I) Ineligible
- (W) Walk-on
- Injured
- Current redshirt

Roster

== Schedule and results ==
Date time, TV	Rank^{#}	Opponent^{#}	Result	Record	Site (attendance) city, state
Exhibition
11/03/2016*; 7:00 pm, SECN+		Fort Valley State	W 94–38		Stegeman Coliseum; Athens, GA
Regular season
11/11/2016*; 7:00 pm, ACCN Extra		at Clemson	L 64–74	0–1	Littlejohn Coliseum (9,000); Clemson, SC
11/14/2016*; 7:00 pm, SECN+		UNC Asheville; CBE Hall of Fame Classic regional round	W 60–46	1–1	Stegeman Coliseum (6,415); Athens, GA
11/17/2016*; 7:00 pm, SECN		Furman; CBE Hall of Fame Classic regional round	W 84–78	2–1	Stegeman Coliseum (5,923); Athens, GA
11/21/2016*; 7:00 pm, ESPNU		vs. George Washington; CBE Hall of Fame Classic semifinals	W 81–73	3–1	Sprint Center (3,527); Kansas City, MO
11/22/2016*; 10:00 pm, ESPN2		vs. No. 5 Kansas; CBE Hall of Fame Classic championship	L 54–65	3–2	Sprint Center (12,147); Kansas City, MO
11/25/2016*; 7:00 pm, SECN+		Gardner–Webb	W 77–59	4–2	Stegeman Coliseum (7,069); Athens, GA
11/30/2016*; 7:00 pm, SECN+		Morehouse	W 86–72	5–2	Stegeman Coliseum (5,203); Athens, GA
12/04/2016*; 2:00 pm, ESPNU		Marquette	L 79–89	5–3	Stegeman Coliseum (7,620); Athens, GA
12/14/2016*; 6:00 pm, SECN		Louisiana–Lafayette	W 73–60	6–3	Stegeman Coliseum (5,125); Athens, GA
12/17/2016*; 1:00 pm, SECN		Charleston Southern	W 84–64	7–3	Stegeman Coliseum (10,523); Athens, GA
12/20/2016*; 7:00 pm, ESPNU		at Georgia Tech	W 60–43	8–3	Hank McCamish Pavilion (8,600); Atlanta, GA
12/23/2016*; 7:00 pm, ESPN3		at Oakland	L 79–86	8–4	Athletics Center O'rena (4,063); Rochester Hills, MI
12/29/2016; 7:00 pm, ESPNU		at Auburn	W 96–84	9–4 (1–0)	Auburn Arena (9,121); Auburn, AL
01/04/2017; 7:00 pm, ESPNU		South Carolina	L 61–67	9–5 (1–1)	Stegeman Coliseum (8,856); Athens, GA
01/07/2017; 1:00 pm, SECN		Missouri	W 71–66	10–5 (2–1)	Stegeman Coliseum (8,635); Athens, GA
01/11/2017; 7:00 pm, ESPNU		at Ole Miss	W 69–47	11–5 (3–1)	The Pavilion at Ole Miss (7,029); Oxford, MS
01/14/2017; 12:00 pm, ESPN2		at No. 23 Florida	L 76–80 ^{OT}	11–6 (3–2)	O'Connell Center (10,376); Gainesville, FL
01/17/2017; 9:00 pm, ESPNU		Vanderbilt	W 76–68	12–6 (4–2)	Stegeman Coliseum (7,480); Athens, GA
01/21/2017; 12:00 pm, ESPN2		at Texas A&M	L 62–63	12–7 (4–3)	Reed Arena (8,023); College Station, TX
01/25/2017; 9:00 pm, ESPNU		Alabama	L 60–80	12–8 (4–4)	Stegeman Coliseum (6,661); Athens, GA
01/28/2017*; 4:00 pm, ESPN		Texas; Big 12/SEC Challenge	W 59–57	13–8	Stegeman Coliseum (10,029); Athens, GA
01/31/2017; 9:00 pm, ESPN		at No. 8 Kentucky	L 81–90 ^{OT}	13–9 (4–5)	Rupp Arena (23,814); Lexington, KY
02/04/2017; 2:00 pm, ESPN2		at No. 19 South Carolina	L 75–77	13–10 (4–6)	Colonial Life Arena (18,000); Columbia, SC
02/07/2017; 7:00 pm, ESPN2		No. 17 Florida	L 60–72	13–11 (4–7)	Stegeman Coliseum (7,605); Athens, GA
02/11/2017; 4:00 pm, ESPNU		at Tennessee	W 76–75	14–11 (5–7)	Thompson–Boling Arena (15,637); Knoxville, TN
02/14/2017; 9:00 pm, ESPNU		Mississippi State	W 79–72	15–11 (6–7)	Stegeman Coliseum (5,822); Athens, GA
02/18/2017; 6:00 pm, ESPN		No. 13 Kentucky	L 77–82	15–12 (6–8)	Stegeman Coliseum (10,523); Athens, GA
02/23/2017; 7:00 pm, ESPN2		at Alabama	W 60–55	16–12 (7–8)	Coleman Coliseum (11,787); Tuscaloosa, AL
02/25/2017; 6:00 pm, SECN		LSU	W 82–80	17–12 (8–8)	Stegeman Coliseum (10,042); Athens, GA
03/01/2017; 6:30 pm, SECN		Auburn	W 79–78	18–12 (9–8)	Stegeman Coliseum (7,145); Athens, GA
03/04/2017; 2:00 pm, ESPN2		at Arkansas	L 67-85	18–13 (9–9)	Bud Walton Arena (18,247); Fayetteville, AR
SEC Tournament
03/09/2017; 1:00 pm, SECN	(8)	vs. (9) Tennessee; Second round	W 59–57	19–13	Bridgestone Arena (11,973); Nashville, TN
03/10/2017; 1:00 pm, SECN	(8)	vs. (1) No. 8 Kentucky; Quarterfinals	L 60–71	19–14	Bridgestone Arena (18,130); Nashville, TN
NIT
03/15/2017*; 7:00 pm, ESPN3	(2)	(7) Belmont; First Round – Syracuse Bracket	L 69–78	19–15	Stegeman Coliseum (2,904); Athens, GA
*Non-conference game. ^{#}Rankings from AP Poll. (#) Tournament seedings in parentheses. All times are in Eastern Time.

== See also ==
2016–17 Georgia Lady Bulldogs basketball team
