= 2016–17 Texas A&M Aggies men's basketball team =

American college basketball season

2016–17 Texas A&M Aggies men's basketball
- Conference: Southeastern Conference
- Record: 16–15 (8–10 SEC)
- Head coach: Billy Kennedy (6th season)
- Assistant coaches: Amir Abdur-Rahim (3rd season); Isaac Chew; Ulric Maligi (1st season)
- Home arena: Reed Arena

2016–17 Southeastern Conference men's basketball standings
	Conf.				Overall
Team	W		L	PCT	W		L	PCT
No. 6 Kentucky †	16	–	2	.889	32	–	6	.842
No. 20 Florida	14	–	4	.778	27	–	9	.750
Arkansas	12	–	6	.667	26	–	10	.722
South Carolina	12	–	6	.667	26	–	11	.703
Ole Miss	10	–	8	.556	22	–	14	.611
Alabama	10	–	8	.556	19	–	15	.559
Vanderbilt	10	–	8	.556	19	–	16	.543
Georgia	9	–	9	.500	19	–	15	.559
Texas A&M	8	–	10	.444	16	–	15	.516
Tennessee	8	–	10	.444	16	–	16	.500
Auburn	7	–	11	.389	18	–	14	.563
Mississippi State	6	–	12	.333	16	–	16	.500
LSU	2	–	16	.111	10	–	21	.323
Missouri	2	–	16	.111	8	–	24	.250
† 2017 SEC tournament winner Rankings from AP poll

The 2016–17 Texas A&M Aggies men's basketball team represented Texas A&M University in the 2016–17 NCAA Division I men's basketball season. The team's head coach was Billy Kennedy, who was in his sixth season at Texas A&M. The team played their home games at Reed Arena in College Station, Texas in its fifth season as a member of the Southeastern Conference. They finished the season 16–15, 8–10 in SEC play to finish in a tie for ninth place. They lost in the second round of the SEC tournament to Vanderbilt.

== Previous season ==
The Texas A&M finished the season 28–9, 13–5 in SEC play to win a share of the SEC regular season championship. They defeated Florida and LSU to advance to the championship game of the SEC tournament, where they lost to Kentucky. They received an at-large bid to the NCAA tournament, where they defeated Green Bay and Northern Iowa to advance to the Sweet Sixteen, where they lost to Oklahoma.

== Departures ==
Name	Number	Pos.	Height	Weight	Year	Hometown	Reason for departure
Anthony Collins	11	G	6'1"	175	RS senior	Houston, TX	Graduated
Jalen Jones	12	G/F	6'7"	220	RS senior	Dallas, TX	Graduated
Juan Aparicio	13	G	6'4"	196	Senior	Bogotá, Colombia	Walk-on; graduated
Alex Caruso	21	G	6'5"	186	Senior	College Station, TX	Graduated; joined NBA G League
Danuel House	23	G	6'7"	212	RS senior	Sugar Land, TX	Graduated; entered 2016 NBA draft
Kyle Dobbins	25	G	6'0"	175	Senior	Houston, TX	Graduated

=== Incoming transfers ===
Name	Number	Pos.	Height	Weight	Year	Hometown	Previous school
J. C. Hampton	G	5	6'0"	180	RS senior	Gainesville, GA	Transferred from Lipscomb. Will be eligible to play immediately since Hampton graduated from Lipscomb.

== 2016 recruiting class ==
College recruiting
Name	Hometown	School	Height	Weight	Commit date
Robert Williams III #12 PF	Vivian, LA	North Caddo High School	6 ft 8 in (2.03 m)	220 lb (100 kg)	Jun 20, 2015
Robert Williams III #12 PF	Recruit ratings: Scout: Rivals: (86)				
J. J. Caldwell #15 PG	Houston, TX	Cypress Woods High School	5 ft 11 in (1.80 m)	170 lb (77 kg)	May 3, 2015
J. J. Caldwell #15 PG	Recruit ratings: Scout: Rivals: (82)				
Deshawn Corprew #18 SF	Norfolk, VA	Quality Education Academy	6 ft 5 in (1.96 m)	190 lb (86 kg)	May 17, 2016
Deshawn Corprew #18 SF	Recruit ratings: Scout: Rivals: (82)				
Eric Vila; PF	Girona, Spain	FC Barcelona Lassa	6 ft 9 in (2.06 m)	205 lb (93 kg)	May 23, 2016
Eric Vila; PF	Recruit ratings: Scout: Rivals: (NR)				
Overall recruit ranking: Scout: Not Ranked Rivals: Not Ranked ESPN: Not Ranked
Note: In many cases, Scout, Rivals, 247Sports, On3, and ESPN may conflict in their listings of height and weight.; In these cases, the average was taken. ESPN grades are on a 100-point scale.; Sources: "Texas A&M 2016 Basketball Commitments". Rivals.; "2016 Texas A&M Basketball Commits". Scout.; "ESPN". ESPN.; "Scout.com Team Recruiting Rankings". Scout.; "2016 Team Ranking". Rivals.

=== Recruits for class of 2017 ===
College recruiting (2017)
Name	Hometown	School	Height	Weight	Commit date
TJ Starks; PG	Lancaster, TX	Lancaster High School	6 ft 2 in (1.88 m)	185 lb (84 kg)	Jun 30, 2016
TJ Starks; PG	Recruit ratings: Scout: Rivals: (NR)				
Isiah Jasey; PF	Wichita, Kansas	Sunrise Christian School	6 ft 9 in (2.06 m)	220 lb (100 kg)	Aug 8, 2016
Isiah Jasey; PF	Recruit ratings: Scout: Rivals: (82)				
Savion Flagg; SF	Alvin, TX	Alvin High School	6 ft 6 in (1.98 m)	190 lb (86 kg)	Sep 14, 2016
Savion Flagg; SF	Recruit ratings: Scout: Rivals: (84)				
Jay Jay Chandler; PG	Katy, TX	Cinco Ranch High School	6 ft 4 in (1.93 m)	171 lb (78 kg)	Nov 16, 2016
Jay Jay Chandler; PG	Recruit ratings: Scout: Rivals: (81)				
Overall recruit ranking: Scout: Not Ranked Rivals: Not Ranked ESPN: Not Ranked
Note: In many cases, Scout, Rivals, 247Sports, On3, and ESPN may conflict in their listings of height and weight.; In these cases, the average was taken. ESPN grades are on a 100-point scale.; Sources: "Texas A&M 2017 Basketball Commitments". Rivals.; "2017 Texas A&M Basketball Commits". Scout.; "ESPN". ESPN.; "Scout.com Team Recruiting Rankings". Scout.; "2017 Team Ranking". Rivals.

== Roster ==
2016–17 Texas A&M Aggies men's basketball team
Players
Coaches

Pos.	#	Name	Height	Weight	Year	Previous school	Hometown
G	0	Kobie Eubanks	6 ft 5 in (1.96 m)	206 lb (93 kg)	So	Our Savior New American School	Fort Lauderdale, Florida
F	1	D. J. Hogg	6 ft 8 in (2.03 m)	220 lb (100 kg)	So	Plano West	Plano, Texas
F	2	Eric Vila	6 ft 11 in (2.11 m)	206 lb (93 kg)	Fr	FC Barcelona Lassa	Girona, Spain
G	3	Admon Gilder	6 ft 3 in (1.91 m)	198 lb (90 kg)	So	James Madison	Dallas, Texas
G	4	J. J. Caldwell (I)	6 ft 1 in (1.85 m)	184 lb (83 kg)	Fr	SATCH Homeschool	Houston, Texas
G	5	J. C. Hampton	6 ft 1 in (1.85 m)	192 lb (87 kg)	RS Sr	East Hall; Lipscomb	Gainesville, Georgia
C	10	Tonny Trocha-Morelos	6 ft 10 in (2.08 m)	224 lb (102 kg)	RS Jr	Mayor Jose Celestino Mutis	Cartagena, Colombia
G	11	Mark French (W)	5 ft 8 in (1.73 m)	150 lb (68 kg)	Fr	Prestonwood Christian Academy	Plano, Texas
G	12	Chris Collins (W)	6 ft 2 in (1.88 m)	183 lb (83 kg)	Jr	Friendswood	Friendswood, Texas
G	20	Kyle Nugent (W)	6 ft 4 in (1.93 m)	180 lb (82 kg)	So	College Station	College Station, Texas
G	22	Frank Byers	5 ft 10 in (1.78 m)	177 lb (80 kg)	So	South Oak Cliff	Dallas, Texas
G	23	Caleb Smith	6 ft 0 in (1.83 m)	178 lb (81 kg)	Fr	Bridgeport	Wichita, Kansas
G	33	Chase Carlton (W)	6 ft 1 in (1.85 m)	186 lb (84 kg)	So	Westlake	Austin, Texas
C	34	Tyler Davis	6 ft 10 in (2.08 m)	270 lb (122 kg)	So	Plano West	Plano, Texas
F	42	Tavario Miller	6 ft 7 in (2.01 m)	226 lb (103 kg)	Sr	Wheatley (TX)	Long Island, Bahamas
F	44	Robert Williams III	6 ft 9 in (2.06 m)	237 lb (108 kg)	Fr	North Caddo	Vivian, Louisiana

Head coach

- Billy Kennedy (Southeastern Louisiana)

Assistant coach(es)

- Amir Abdur-Rahim (Murray State)
- Issac Chew (Avila)
- Ulric Maligi (Howard)

Legend

- (C) Team captain
- (S) Suspended
- (I) Ineligible
- (W) Walk-on
- Injured
- Current redshirt

Roster

== Schedule ==
Date time, TV	Rank^{#}	Opponent^{#}	Result	Record	Site (attendance) city, state
Exhibition
11/04/2016*; 7:00 pm		St. Edward's	W 87–69	–	Reed Arena (5,643); College Station, TX
Regular season
11/11/2016*; 8:00 pm, SECN		Northwestern State	W 72–44	1–0	Reed Arena (7,539); College Station, TX
11/14/2016*; 7:00 pm		American	W 76–53	2–0	Reed Arena (6,043); College Station, TX
11/18/2016*; 6:00 pm, SECN		USC	L 63–65	2–1	Reed Arena (8,749); College Station, TX
11/24/2016*; 1:00 pm, ESPN3		vs. Cal State Northridge; Wooden Legacy quarterfinals	W 95–73	3–1	Titan Gym; Fullerton, CA
11/25/2016*; 5:30 pm, ESPNU		vs. Virginia Tech; Wooden Legacy semifinals	W 68–65	4–1	Titan Gym; Fullerton, CA
11/27/2016*; 7:30 pm, ESPN		vs. No. 14 UCLA; Wooden Legacy championship	L 67–74	4–2	Honda Center (4,221); Anaheim, CA
12/05/2016*; 7:00 pm, SECN		Texas A&M–Corpus Christi	W 86–69	5–2	Reed Arena (6,275); College Station, TX
12/07/2016*; 7:00 pm		Denver	W 80–58	6–2	Reed Arena (6,306); College Station, TX
12/10/2016*; 7:00 pm, SECN		South Carolina State	W 83–76	7–2	Reed Arena (6,934); College Station, TX
12/17/2016*; 11:00 am, ESPN2		vs. No. 19 Arizona; Lone Star Shootout	L 63–67	7–3	Toyota Center (8,777); Houston, TX
12/21/2016*; 7:00 pm		Saint Francis (PA)	W 81–58	8–3	Reed Arena (9,207); College Station, TX
12/29/2016; 8:00 pm, SECN		Tennessee	L 63–73	8–4 (0–1)	Reed Arena (9,199); College Station, TX
01/03/2017; 8:00 pm, ESPN		at No. 6 Kentucky	L 58–100	8–5 (0–2)	Rupp Arena (23,455); Lexington, KY
01/07/2017; 12:30 pm, CBS		at South Carolina	L 68–79	8–6 (0–3)	Colonial Life Arena (14,249); Columbia, SC
01/11/2017; 7:30 pm, SECN		LSU	W 92–62	9–6 (1–3)	Reed Arena (8,033); College Station, TX
01/14/2017; 12:00 pm, CBS		at Mississippi State	L 59–67	9–7 (1–4)	Humphrey Coliseum (8,588); Starkville, MS
01/17/2017; 6:00 pm, SECN		Arkansas	L 60–62	9–8 (1–5)	Reed Arena (9,474); College Station, TX
01/21/2017; 11:00 am, ESPN2		Georgia	W 63–62	10–8 (2–5)	Reed Arena (8,023); College Station, TX
01/25/2017; 6:30 pm, ESPN2		at Ole Miss	W 80–76	11–8 (3–5)	The Pavilion at Ole Miss (7,055); Oxford, MS
01/28/2017*; 11:00 am, ESPN		at No. 18 West Virginia; Big 12/SEC Challenge	L 77–81	11–9	WVU Coliseum (12,836); Morgantown, WV
01/31/2017; 8:00 pm, ESPNU		Vanderbilt	L 54–68	11–10 (3–6)	Reed Arena (7,508); College Station, TX
02/04/2017; 8:30 pm, ESPNU		at LSU	W 85–73	12–10 (4–6)	Maravich Center (7,059); Baton Rouge, LA
02/08/2017; 7:30 pm, SECN		Missouri	W 76–73	13–10 (5–6)	Reed Arena (8,632); College Station, TX
02/11/2017; 11:00 am, ESPN2		at No. 17 Florida	L 62–71	13–11 (5–6)	O'Connell Center (10,732); Gainesville, FL
02/16/2017; 6:00 pm, ESPN2		at Vanderbilt	L 67–72	13–12 (5–7)	Memorial Gymnasium (8,976); Nashville, TN
02/18/2017; 3:00 pm, ESPNU		Auburn	W 81–62	14–12 (6–8)	Reed Arena (9,377); College Station, TX
02/22/2017; 7:30 pm, SECN		at Arkansas	L 77–86	14–13 (6–9)	Bud Walton Arena (14,117); Fayetteville, AR
02/25/2017; 8:00 pm, ESPN2		Alabama	W 56–53	15–13 (7–9)	Reed Arena (9,661); College Station, TX
02/28/2017; 6:00 pm, SECN		at Missouri	W 60–43	16–13 (8–9)	Mizzou Arena (6,157); Columbia, MO
03/04/2017; 11:00 am, CBS		No. 9 Kentucky	L 63–71	16–14 (8–10)	Reed Arena (9,528); College Station, TX
SEC Tournament
03/09/2017; 6:00 pm, SECN	(10)	vs. (7) Vanderbilt; Second Round	L 41–66	16–15	Bridgestone Arena (13,112); Nashville, TN
*Non-conference game. ^{#}Rankings from AP Poll. (#) Tournament seedings in parentheses. All times are in Central Time.
