= 2016 Maui Invitational =

NCAA men's basketball tournament

2016 Maui Invitational Tournament
- Season: 2016–17
- Teams: 8
- Finals site: Lahaina Civic Center, Maui, Hawaii
- Champions: North Carolina (4th title)
- Runner-up: Wisconsin (1st title game)
- Semifinalists: Oklahoma State (2nd semifinal); Georgetown (2nd semifinal)
- Winning coach: Roy Williams (3rd title)
- MVP: Joel Berry II (North Carolina)

The 2016 Maui Invitational Tournament was an early-season college basketball tournament that was played for the 33rd time. The tournament began in 1984, and was part of the 2016–17 NCAA Division I men's basketball season. The Championship Round was played at the Lahaina Civic Center in Maui, Hawaii from November 21 to 23. Opening round games previously played at campus sites were discontinued.

== Brackets ==
* – Denotes overtime period

=== Opening round ===
The opening round was played on November 11–17 at various sites around the country.

==== November 11 ====
- Chattanooga 81, Tennessee 69 in Knoxville, Tennessee
- Oregon 91, Army 77 in Eugene, Oregon
- Wisconsin 79, Central Arkansas 47 in Madison, Wisconsin

==== November 13 ====
- North Carolina 97, Chattanooga 57 in Chapel Hill, North Carolina

==== November 14 ====
- Oklahoma State 102, Central Arkansas 90 in Stillwater, Oklahoma

==== November 17 ====
- Arkansas State 78, Georgetown 72 in Washington, D.C.

=== Regional round ===
Semifinals; November 19
Army	57
Arkansas State	60
Central Arkansas	64
Chattanooga	75

Final; November 20
Arkansas State	73
Chattanooga	67
Third-place game
Army	76
Central Arkansas	81

*Games played at Christl Arena in West Point, New York

=== Championship round ===
Fifth Place Game; November 23
13	Oregon	79
Connecticut	69
Seventh Place Game
Tennessee	95
Chaminade	81

Consolation 2nd Round; November 22
Tennessee	65
13	Oregon	69
Connecticut	93
Chaminade	82

Quarterfinals; November 21
Tennessee	62
16	Wisconsin	74
Georgetown	65
13	Oregon	61
Oklahoma State	98
Connecticut	90
4	North Carolina	104
Chaminade	61

Semifinals; November 22
16	Wisconsin	73
Georgetown	57
Oklahoma State	75
4	North Carolina	107

Championship; November 23
16	Wisconsin	56
4	North Carolina	71
Third-place game
Georgetown	70
Oklahoma State	97
