= 2016–17 Alabama Crimson Tide men's basketball team =

American college basketball season

2016–17 Alabama Crimson Tide men's basketball

NIT, First Round
- Conference: Southeastern Conference
- Record: 19–15 (10–8 SEC)
- Head coach: Avery Johnson (2nd season)
- Assistant coaches: Bob Simon (2nd season); John Pelphrey (1st season); Antoine Pettway (5th season)
- Home arena: Coleman Coliseum (Capacity: 15,383)

2016–17 Southeastern Conference men's basketball standings
	Conf.				Overall
Team	W		L	PCT	W		L	PCT
No. 6 Kentucky †	16	–	2	.889	32	–	6	.842
No. 20 Florida	14	–	4	.778	27	–	9	.750
Arkansas	12	–	6	.667	26	–	10	.722
South Carolina	12	–	6	.667	26	–	11	.703
Ole Miss	10	–	8	.556	22	–	14	.611
Alabama	10	–	8	.556	19	–	15	.559
Vanderbilt	10	–	8	.556	19	–	16	.543
Georgia	9	–	9	.500	19	–	15	.559
Texas A&M	8	–	10	.444	16	–	15	.516
Tennessee	8	–	10	.444	16	–	16	.500
Auburn	7	–	11	.389	18	–	14	.563
Mississippi State	6	–	12	.333	16	–	16	.500
LSU	2	–	16	.111	10	–	21	.323
Missouri	2	–	16	.111	8	–	24	.250
† 2017 SEC tournament winner Rankings from AP poll

The 2016–17 Alabama Crimson Tide men's basketball team (variously "Alabama", "UA", "Bama" or "The Tide") represented the University of Alabama in the 2016–17 NCAA Division I men's basketball season. The Crimson Tide played its home games at Coleman Coliseum in Tuscaloosa, Alabama, as a member of the Southeastern Conference. Avery Johnson was in his second year as head coach of the Tide. They finished the season 19–15, 10–8 in SEC play to finish in a tie for fifth place in SEC play. They defeated Mississippi State and South Carolina to advance to the semifinals of the SEC tournament where they lost to Kentucky. They received an invitation to the National Invitation Tournament where they lost in the First Round to Richmond.

== Previous season ==
The Crimson Tide finished the season 18–15, 8–10 in SEC play to finish in 10th place. They defeated Ole Miss in the second round of the SEC tournament to advance to the quarterfinals where they lost to Kentucky. The Crimson Tide received an invitation to the National Invitation Tournament as a #5 seed, where the team lost to Creighton in the first round.

== Departures ==
Name	Number	Pos.	Height	Weight	Year	Home town	Notes
Michael Kessens	3	F	6'9"	228	RS Junior	Nyon, Switzerland	Graduate transferred Florida International
Arthur Edwards	4	G	6'6"	217	RS Senior	Washington, D.C.	Graduated
Justin Coleman	5	G	5'10"	168	Sophomore	Birmingham, AL	Transferred to Samford
Retin Obasohan	32	G	6'2"	210	RS Senior	Antwerp, Belgium	Graduated

=== Incoming transfers ===
Name	Number	Pos.	Height	Weight	Year	Hometown	Previous School
Corban Collins	3	G	6'3"	190	RS Senior	High Point, NC	Transferred from Morehead State. Will eligible to play immediately since Collins graduated from Morehead State.
Daniel Giddens	4	F/C	6'10"	228	Sophomore	Marietta, GA	Transferred from Ohio State. Under NCAA transfer rules, Giddens will not play for the 2016–17 season. Will have three years of remaining eligibility.
Ar'mond Davis	22	F	6'5"	170	Junior	Tacoma, WA	Junior college transferred from College of Southern Idaho

== 2016 recruiting class ==
College recruiting information
Name	Hometown	School	Height	Weight	Commit date
Braxton Key; SF	Nashville, TN	Oak Hill Academy	6 ft 8 in (2.03 m)	240 lb (110 kg)	Oct 21, 2015
Braxton Key; SF	Recruit ratings: Scout: Rivals: 247Sports: ESPN: (88)				
Overall recruit ranking: Scout: NR Rivals: NR 247Sports: 68 ESPN: NR
Note: In many cases, Scout, Rivals, 247Sports, On3, and ESPN may conflict in their listings of height and weight.; In these cases, the average was taken. ESPN grades are on a 100-point scale.; Sources: "Alabama 2016 Basketball Commitments". Rivals.; "2016 Alabama Basketball Commits". Scout.; "ESPN". ESPN.; "Scout.com Team Recruiting Rankings". Scout.; "2016 Team Ranking". Rivals.

== 2017 Recruiting class ==
College recruiting information
Name	Hometown	School	Height	Weight	Commit date
Herbert Jones; SG	Moundville, AL	Hale County High School	6 ft 7 in (2.01 m)	183 lb (83 kg)	Oct 6, 2016
Herbert Jones; SG	Recruit ratings: Scout: Rivals: 247Sports: ESPN: (79)				
Alex Reese; PF	Pelham, AL	Pelham High School	6 ft 9 in (2.06 m)	225 lb (102 kg)	Oct 6, 2016
Alex Reese; PF	Recruit ratings: Scout: Rivals: 247Sports: ESPN: (82)				
Galin Smith; C	Clinton, MS	Clinton High School	6 ft 10 in (2.08 m)	220 lb (100 kg)	Oct 7, 2016
Galin Smith; C	Recruit ratings: Scout: Rivals: 247Sports: ESPN: (NR)				
John Petty Jr. SG	Huntsville, AL	Jemison High School	6 ft 5 in (1.96 m)	180 lb (82 kg)	Oct 10, 2016
John Petty Jr. SG	Recruit ratings: Scout: Rivals: 247Sports: ESPN: (91)				
Collin Sexton; PG	Mableton, GA	Pebblebrook High School	6 ft 2 in (1.88 m)	182 lb (83 kg)	Oct 10, 2016
Collin Sexton; PG	Recruit ratings: Scout: Rivals: 247Sports: ESPN: (95)				
Overall recruit ranking: Scout: 6 Rivals: 6 247Sports: 6 ESPN: 6
Note: In many cases, Scout, Rivals, 247Sports, On3, and ESPN may conflict in their listings of height and weight.; In these cases, the average was taken. ESPN grades are on a 100-point scale.; Sources: "Alabama 2017 Basketball Commitments". Rivals.; "2017 Alabama Basketball Commits". Scout.; "Alabama 2017 Basketball Commits". ESPN.; "Scout.com Team Recruiting Rankings". Scout.; "2016 Team Ranking". Rivals.; "Alabama 2017 Basketball Commits". 247Sports.

== Roster ==
2016–17 Alabama Crimson Tide men's basketball team
Players
Coaches

Pos.	#	Name	Height	Weight	Year	Previous school	Hometown
G/F	0	Nick King (injured)	6 ft 7 in (2.01 m)	225 lb (102 kg)	RS Jr	East HS; Memphis	Memphis, TN
G/F	1	Riley Norris	6 ft 7 in (2.01 m)	203 lb (92 kg)	Jr	Albertville HS	Albertville, AL
G	2	Lawson Schaffer (W)	5 ft 11 in (1.8 m)	160 lb (73 kg)	So	Cullman HS	Cullman, AL
G	3	Corban Collins	6 ft 3 in (1.91 m)	190 lb (86 kg)	RS Sr	Massanutten Military Academy; Morehead State	High Point, NC
F	4	Daniel Giddens (redshirt)	6 ft 10 in (2.08 m)	235 lb (107 kg)	So	Oak Hill Academy; Ohio State	Mableton, GA
G	5	Avery Johnson Jr.	5 ft 11 in (1.8 m)	187 lb (85 kg)	RS So	Plano West; Texas A&M	Houston, TX
F	10	Jimmie Taylor (C)	6 ft 10 in (2.08 m)	248 lb (112 kg)	Sr	Greensboro East HS	Greensboro, AL
F	11	Shannon Hale (S)	6 ft 8 in (2.03 m)	233 lb (106 kg)	Sr	Christ School	Johnson City, TN
G	12	Dazon Ingram	6 ft 5 in (1.96 m)	205 lb (93 kg)	RS Fr	Theodore HS	Theodore, AL
F	21	Bola Olaniyan	6 ft 7 in (2.01 m)	235 lb (107 kg)	RS Sr	Richmond HS; Southern Illinois University	Lagos, Nigeria
G	22	Ar'mond Davis	6 ft 6 in (1.98 m)	190 lb (86 kg)	Jr	Foss HS; College of Southern Idaho	Tacoma, WA
G	23	Brandon Austin	6 ft 5 in (1.96 m)	197 lb (89 kg)	So	Carver HS	Montgomery, AL
F	25	Braxton Key	6 ft 8 in (2.03 m)	240 lb (109 kg)	Fr	Oak Hill Academy	Deactur, GA
F	33	Landon Fuller (W)	6 ft 8 in (2.03 m)	230 lb (104 kg)	Fr	Brentwood Academy	Brentwood, TN
F	35	Donta Hall	6 ft 9 in (2.06 m)	224 lb (102 kg)	So	Luverne HS	Luverne, AL

Head coach

- Avery Johnson (Southern)

Assistant coach(es)

- Bob Simon (Eastern Michigan)
- John Pelphrey (Kentucky)
- Antoine Pettway (Alabama)

Strength and conditioning coach(es)

- Lou DeNeen (South Florida)

Legend

- (C) Team captain
- (S) Suspended
- (I) Ineligible
- (W) Walk-on
- Injured
- Current redshirt

Roster
Last update: November 26, 2016

== Schedule and results ==
Date time, TV	Rank^{#}	Opponent^{#}	Result	Record	High points	High rebounds	High assists	Site (attendance) city, state
Exhibition game
November 3*; 7:00 pm		Faulkner	W 91–71	–	17 – Davis	7 – Key	5 – King	Coleman Coliseum (10,173); Tuscaloosa, AL
Non-conference regular season
November 11*; 8:00 pm		Coastal Carolina; Men Who Speak Up Main Event	W 70–53	1–0	15 – Collins	7 – Taylor	5 – Ingram	Coleman Coliseum (14,579); Tuscaloosa, AL
November 15*; 12:15 pm, ESPN2		Dayton; College Hoops Tip-Off Marathon	L 72–77	1–1	15 – Key	6 – Key	7 – Ingram	Coleman Coliseum (10,834); Tuscaloosa, AL
November 18*; 8:00 pm, SECN		Ball State; Men Who Speak Up Main Event	W 77–59	2–1	19 – Hale	5 – Johnson	6 – Johnson	Coleman Coliseum (11,665); Tuscaloosa, AL
November 21*; 11:00 pm, YouTube		vs. Valparaiso; Men Who Speak Up Main Event	L 60–68	2–2	10 – Norris	12 – Hall	5 – Ingram	MGM Grand Garden Arena (2,107); Paradise, NV
November 23*; 8:30 pm, YouTube		vs. Saint Louis; Men Who Speak Up Main Event	W 62–57	3–2	16 – Key	6 – Hall	3 – Collins	MGM Grand Garden Arena; Paradise, NV
November 29*; 6:00 pm, SECN		Charleston Southern	W 76–46	4–2	14 – Key	7 – Hall	4 – Ingram	Coleman Coliseum (11,425); Tuscaloosa, AL
December 2*; 8:30 pm, ESPNU		at Texas	L 68–77	4–3	12 – Ingram	7 – Key	6 – Ingram	Frank Erwin Center (10,268); Austin, TX
December 11*; 5:00 pm, ESPNU		at No. 24 Oregon	L 56–65	4–4	14 – Hall	7 – Hall	2 – Hall	Matthew Knight Arena (8,922); Eugene, OR
December 15*; 7:00 pm		USC Upstate	W 78–61	5–4	15 – Hall	10 – Olaniyan	5 – Key	Coleman Coliseum (9,773); Tuscaloosa, AL
December 18*; 3:00 pm, ESPNU		vs. Clemson; Vulcan Classic	L 54–67	5–5	17 – Johnson	7 – Hall	2 – Johnson	Legacy Arena (11,147); Birmingham, AL
December 21*; 8:00 pm, SECN		vs. Arkansas State; Huntsville Showcase	W 67–57	6–5	12 – Taylor	9 – Norris	4 – Johnson	Von Braun Center (6,572); Huntsville, AL
December 29*; 7:00 pm		Stetson	W 83–60	7–5	18 – Norris	13 – Olaniyan	6 – Johnson	Coleman Coliseum (11,128); Tuscaloosa, AL
SEC regular season
January 3; 7:30 pm, SECN		at Mississippi State	W 68–58	8–5 (1–0)	13 – Ingram	9 – Ingram	4 – Ingram	Humphrey Coliseum (7,452); Starkville, MS
January 7; 6:00 pm, ESPNU		Vanderbilt	W 59–56	9–5 (2–0)	12 – Davis	11 – Key	5 – Ingram	Coleman Coliseum (11,256); Tuscaloosa, AL
January 10; 8:00 pm, ESPNU		No. 23 Florida	L 67–80	9–6 (2–1)	24 – Key	8 – Hall	3 – Johnson	Coleman Coliseum (12,923); Tuscaloosa, AL
January 14; 2:30 pm, SECN		at LSU	W 81–66	10–6 (3–1)	24 – Collins	9 – Key	7 – Ingram	Maravich Center (8,419); Baton Rouge, LA
January 18; 6:00 pm, ESPNU		Missouri	W 68–56	11–6 (4–1)	13 – Norris	9 – Taylor	3 – Ingram	Coleman Coliseum (10,347); Tuscaloosa, AL
January 21; 3:00 pm, ESPN2		at Auburn; Iron Bowl of Basketball	L 64–84	11–7 (4–2)	18 – Key	11 – Olaniyan	3 – Key	Auburn Arena (9,121); Auburn, AL
January 25; 8:00 pm, ESPNU		at Georgia	W 80–60	12–7 (5–2)	26 – Key	11 – Hall	2 – Key	Stegeman Coliseum (6,661); Athens, GA
January 28; 5:00 pm, SECN		Mississippi State	W 71–62	13–7 (6–2)	19 – Key	11 – Olaniyan	6 – Ingram	Coleman Coliseum (15,383); Tuscaloosa, AL
February 1; 6:00 pm, SECN		at Arkansas	L 68–87	13–8 (6–3)	14 – Ingram	9 – Olaniyan	4 – Collins	Bud Walton Arena (14,004); Fayetteville, AR
February 4; 7:30 pm, SECN		Auburn; Iron Bowl of Basketball	L 77–82	13–9 (6–4)	17 – Key	8 – Olaniyan	4 – Key	Coleman Coliseum (15,383); Tuscaloosa, AL
February 7; 5:30 pm, SECN		at No. 19 South Carolina	W 90–86 ^{4OT}	14–9 (7–4)	23 – Johnson	14 – Norris	4 – Norris	Colonial Life Arena (14,450); Columbia, SC
February 11; 12:00 pm, CBS		No. 15 Kentucky	L 58–67	14–10 (7–5)	21 – Key	10 – Olaniyan	3 – Ingram	Coleman Coliseum (15,383); Tuscaloosa, AL
February 15; 7:30 pm, SECN		at Missouri	W 57–54	15–10 (8–5)	18 – Ingram	14 – Olaniyan	3 – Key	Mizzou Arena (5,991); Columbia, MO
February 18; 2:30 pm, SECN		LSU	W 90–72	16–10 (9–5)	17 – Norris	16 – Olaniyan	7 – Key	Coleman Coliseum (15,383); Tuscaloosa, AL
February 23; 6:00 pm, ESPN2		Georgia	L 55–60	16–11 (9–6)	17 – Davis	9 – Key	3 – Key	Coleman Coliseum (11,787); Tuscaloosa, AL
February 25; 7:00 pm, ESPN2		at Texas A&M	L 53–56	16–12 (9–7)	11 – Davis	7 – Taylor	3 – Key	Reed Arena (9,661); College Station, TX
March 1; 7:30 pm, SECN		Ole Miss	W 70–55	17–12 (10–7)	22 – Ingram	10 – Olaniyan	5 – Key	Coleman Coliseum (10,672); Tuscaloosa, AL
March 4; 12:00 pm, SECN		at Tennessee	L 54–59	17–13 (10–8)	13 – Norris	7 – Hall	4 – Ingram	Thompson–Boling Arena (14,652); Knoxville, TN
SEC Tournament
March 9; 2:30 pm, SECN	(5)	vs. (12) Mississippi State; Second round	W 75–55	18–13	17 – Ingram	7 – Norris	6 – Johnson	Bridgestone Arena (11,973); Nashville, TN
March 10; 2:30 pm, SECN	(5)	vs. (4) South Carolina; Quarterfinals	W 64–53	19–13	18 – Key	10 – Olaniyan	5 – Collins	Bridgestone Arena (18,130); Nashville, TN
March 11; 12:00 pm, ESPN	(5)	vs. (1) No. 8 Kentucky; Semifinals	L 74–79	19–14	17 – Ingram	6 – Key	4 – Key	Bridgestone Arena (19,196); Nashville, TN
National Invitation Tournament
March 14*; 8:15 pm, ESPN2	(3)	(6) Richmond; First Round – Iowa Bracket	L 64–71	19–15	19 – Collins	7 – Olaniyan	6 – Ingram	Coleman Coliseum (4,401); Tuscaloosa, AL
*Non-conference game. ^{#}Rankings from AP Poll. (#) Tournament seedings in parentheses. All times are in Central Time. Schedule link: http://www.rolltide.com/schedule.aspx?path=mbball

== See also ==
- 2016–17 Alabama Crimson Tide women's basketball team
