= Schnider Hérard =

Haitian basketball player (born 1996)

Schnider Herard
No. 33 – Free agent
- Position: Center

Personal information
- Born: October 7, 1996 (age 30) Port-au-Prince, Haiti
- Listed height: 6 ft 10 in (2.08 m)
- Listed weight: 250 lb (113 kg)

Career information
- High school: Prestonwood Christian Academy (Plano, Texas)
- College: Mississippi State (2016–2018)
- Playing career: 2018–present

Career history
- 2020: Sloga Kraljevo

Schnider Hérard (born October 7, 1996) is a Haitian basketball player who last played for Sloga Kraljevo of the Basketball League of Serbia. He played college basketball for the Mississippi State. Instagram: Sherard34

== Early years ==
Hérard was born in Port-au-Prince, Haiti to Jean Hérard Lesner and Carline Bois-de-Fer. When he was just 10 years old his mother died giving labor to a sibling. He moved to the U.S. and spoke no English upon arrival. He enrolled in McKinney Boyd High School and started his ninth-grade year where he read English at only a third–fourth-grade level. Conversely, he excelled in his native tongue and earned the French award.

== High school career ==
Hérard attend the Prestonwood Christian Academy in Plano, Texas. He led his team to three consecutive 5A state championships and to a 33–4 record his senior year, averaging 17.6 points and 8.2 rebounds. He has scored 1,000 points in his career.

Hérard was awarded MVP of the 5A State Championship in his sophomore and senior year and earned first-team all-state sophomore, junior and senior years. He was named to the Max Prep Texas Top 25.

Considered a four-star recruit by Rivals.com, Hérard was listed as the No. 7 center and the No. 37 player in the nation in 2016.

He graduated high school with a 3.1 GPA, just four years after arriving in the U.S.

== College career ==
Hérard chose to play at Mississippi State, despite receiving 20+ offers from other schools. Hérard chose Mississippi State because "everything (he) saw was pretty good" and that he was also going to be receiving playing time and by extension heading into his sophomore year when the team's only big who will be a senior, leaves the following year. He also cited coach Ben Howland’s experience and proven success as a deciding factor. He posted 5.1 points and 5.0 rebounds per game as a freshman but saw a decrease in playing time as a sophomore.

On January 20, 2018, Herard announced he would transfer to Maryland. He never actually played a game for the Terrapins and on August 1, 2018, it was announced Herard would instead pursue professional opportunities.
