= Mr. Basketball of Arkansas =

Honor awarded to high school basketball players

The Mr. Basketball of Arkansas award is awarded every year to the student-athlete chosen as the best individual high school basketball player in the state of Arkansas in the U.S. This award was earned by the best of the best in the state of Arkansas. Players who were leaders on and off the court, showed sportsmanship, and lead their team to victory in most occasions.

== Award winners ==
Year	Player	High School	College	NBA/NFL draft
2025	JJ Andrews	Little Rock Christian Academy, Little Rock	Arkansas	
2024	Annor Boateng	Little Rock Central High School, Little Rock	Missouri	
2023	Annor Boateng	Little Rock Central High School, Little Rock	Missouri	
2022	Derrian Ford (2)	Magnolia High School, Magnolia	Arkansas then transferred to Arkansas State	
2021	Derrian Ford	Magnolia High School, Magnolia	Arkansas then transferred to Arkansas State	
2020	Jaylin Williams	Fort Smith Northside High School, Fort Smith	Arkansas	2022 NBA draft: 2nd Rnd, 34th overall by Oklahoma City Thunder
2019	Isaac McBride	Baptist Prep High School, Little Rock	Oral Roberts	
2018	Isaiah Joe	Fort Smith Northside High School, Fort Smith	Arkansas	2020 NBA draft: 2nd Rnd, 49th overall by Philadelphia 76ers
2017	Daniel Gafford	El Dorado High School, El Dorado	Arkansas	2019 NBA draft: 2nd Rnd, 38th overall by Chicago Bulls
2016	Malik Monk	Bentonville High School, Bentonville	Kentucky	2017 NBA draft: 1st Rnd, 11th overall by Charlotte Hornets
2015	KeVaughn Allen (2)	North Little Rock High School, North Little Rock	Florida	NBA G-League: Rio Grande Valley Vipers
2014	KeVaughn Allen	North Little Rock High School, North Little Rock	Florida	NBA G-League: Rio Grande Valley Vipers
2013	Bobby Portis	Hall High School, Little Rock	Arkansas	2015 NBA draft: 1st Rnd, 22nd overall by the Chicago Bulls
2012	Archie Goodwin (2)	Sylvan Hills High School, Sherwood	Kentucky	2013 NBA draft: 1st Rnd, 29th overall by the Oklahoma City Thunder (traded to Phoenix Suns via Golden State Warriors)
2011	Archie Goodwin	Sylvan Hills High School, Sherwood	Kentucky	2013 NBA draft: 1st Rnd, 29th overall by the Oklahoma City Thunder (traded to Phoenix Suns via Golden State Warriors)
2010	Preston Purifoy	Conway High School, Conway	UAB	Undrafted Plays for FC Porto in Euro League
2009	N/A	N/A	N/A	N/A
2008	A. J. Walton	Hall High School, Little Rock	Baylor	Undrafted Plays for Astoria Bydgoszcz in the Polish League
2007	James Anderson (2)	Junction City High School, Junction City	Oklahoma State	2010 NBA draft: 1st Rnd, 20th overall by the San Antonio Spurs
2006	James Anderson	Junction City High School, Junction City	Oklahoma State	2010 NBA draft: 1st Rnd, 20th overall by the San Antonio Spurs
2005	Brandon Ballard	Buffalo Island Central High School, Monette	Arkansas State	No NBA History
2004	Marcus Monk	East Poinsett County High School, Lepanto	Arkansas	2008 NFL draft: 7th Rnd, 248th overall by the Chicago Bears
2003	Ronnie Brewer	Fayetteville High School, Fayetteville	Arkansas	2006 NBA draft: 1st Rnd, 14th overall by the Utah Jazz
2002	Antwoine Blanchard	Parkview Magnet High School, Little Rock	Texas State	Undrafted
2001	Gavin Ludgood	Clarksville High School	Florida Atlantic University	
2000	Kim Adams	J. A. Fair High School, Little Rock	Arkansas State	Undrafted
1999	Joe Johnson	Little Rock Central High School, Little Rock	Arkansas	2001 NBA draft: 1st Rnd, 10th overall by the Boston Celtics
1998	Jason Harrison	Parkview High School, Little Rock	Mississippi	Undrafted
1997	N/A	N/A	N/A	N/A
1996	Nick Bradford	Fayetteville High School, Fayetteville	Kansas	Undrafted
1995	N/A	N/A	N/A	N/A
1994	Matt Daniel	Jonesboro High School, Jonesboro	Colorado/Harding	Undrafted

=== Schools with multiple winners ===
The universities that have multiple award winners tend to be schools that are in, if not, close to the state of Arkansas. These schools are known to have a rich history of basketball in their state and the players that earned the award multiple times have either been drafted to the NBA, or played for a team in the NBA G-League. Oklahoma State University was the first-ever school to have achieved the NCAA championships in back-to-back years. In addition, the school has a total of 6 final four appearances throughout the history of the school, so as you can see Oklahoma State is a school with huge success in the basketball department. The University of Kentucky was known to be successful in the first few years of their career, but there were a couple of setbacks that the school experienced, like a couple of Kentucky players being involved in illegal activities that almost costed the coach his job. The University of Florida, like most of the SEC schools, were once thought of as a football college but eventually after making the NCAA tournaments 3 times in a row, the school soon received recognition as a prestigious basketball university winning multiple SEC championships.

School	Number of Awards	Years
Fayetteville High School	2	1996, 2003
Fort Smith Northside High School	2	2018, 2020
Hall High School	2	2008, 2013
Junction City High School	2	2006, 2007
Little Rock Central High School, Little Rock	2	1999, 2023
Magnolia High School	2	2021, 2022
Parkview High School	2	1998, 2002
Sylvan Hills High School	2	2011, 2012

== Significance ==
George Mikan was a big influence in this award being developed, being that he was the first "Mr. Basketball" player to ever win the award. His influence on the award gave away the idea for each state in the U.S. to be able to have their own Mr. Basketball award. States, for example like, Illinois, Alabama, and Maine who were able to have significant stories regarding the Mr. Basketball award winners in their state.
