= Rashad Madden =

American basketball player

Doxa Lefkadas
- Position: Shooting guard / point guard
- League: Greek A2 Elite League

Personal information
- Born: May 23, 1992 (age 34)
- Listed height: 6 ft 5 in (1.96 m)
- Listed weight: 180.4 lb (82 kg)

Career information
- High school: East Poinsett County (Lepanto, Arkansas)
- College: Arkansas (2011–2015)
- NBA draft: 2015: undrafted
- Playing career: 2015–present

Career history
- 2015: Śląsk Wrocław
- 2015–2016: Rethymno Cretan Kings
- 2016–2018: Hapoel Ramat Gan Givatayim
- 2018–2019: Hapoel Galil Elyon
- 2019–2020: Elitzur Yavne
- 2020–2021: Elitzur Netanya
- 2021–2022: BC Brno
- 2023–2024: NH Ostrava
- 2024–present: Doxa Lefkadas

Rashad Madden (born May 23, 1992) is an American professional basketball player for Doxa Lefkadas of the Greek A2 Elite League. He played college basketball for the University of Arkansas before playing professionally in Poland, Greece, Israel and the Czech Republic.

== High school career ==
Madden played high school basketball at East Poinsett County High School, in Lepanto, Arkansas.

== College career ==
Madden played college basketball at the University of Arkansas, with the Arkansas Razorbacks from 2011 to 2015.

== Professional career ==
Madden earned an invite to the 2015 NBA Summer League, where he played for the Memphis Grizzlies. He signed with Śląsk Wrocław of Poland's Basketball League. Madden averaged 9.7 points and 3.8 assists per game in his first year on the team in the Polish League. He left the club on December due to finance problems. He then signed in Greece, to play with the Greek Basket League club Rethymno Cretan Kings, replacing Marcus Relphorde. He signed for Hapoel Ramat Gan Givatayim of the Israeli National League in August 2016.

On October 11, 2018, Madden signed with Hapoel Galil Elyon for the 2018–19 season. In 37 games played for Galil Elyon, he averaged 15.6 points, 6.9 rebounds and 3.7 assists per game, while shooting 39.6 percent from three-point range. Madden led Galil Elyon to the Israeli National League Finals, where they eventually were fell short to Maccabi Haifa.

On December 4, 2019, Madden signed a one-month contract with Elitzur Yavne as an injury cover for Daniel Mullings. On January 19, 2020, Madden signed with Elitzur Netanya for the rest of the season. He averaged 18.4 points, 6.2 rebounds, 7.5 assists, and 1.0 steal per game. On September 2, 2021, Madden signed with BC Brno of the Czech National Basketball League.

== The Basketball Tournament ==
Rashad Madden played for Team Arkansas in the 2018 edition of The Basketball Tournament. In 2 games, he averaged 5.5 points, 5.5 rebounds, and 3 assists per game. Team Arkansas reached the second round before falling to the Talladega Knights.

== Personal life ==
Madden is a cousin of Malik Monk, who played college basketball at the University of Kentucky and currently plays in the NBA for the Sacramento Kings. Madden is also a cousin of former NFL wide receiver Marcus Monk.
