= 2016–17 Kentucky Wildcats men's basketball team =

2016–17 season of University of Kentucky men's basketball team

2016–17 Kentucky Wildcats men's basketball

SEC regular season and tournament champions

NCAA tournament, Elite Eight
- Conference: Southeastern Conference

Ranking
- Coaches: No. 5
- AP: No. 6
- Record: 32–6 (16–2 SEC)
- Head coach: John Calipari (8th season)
- Assistant coaches: Kenny Payne (7th season); Tony Barbee (3rd season); Joel Justus (1st season)
- Home arena: Rupp Arena

2016–17 Southeastern Conference men's basketball standings
	Conf.				Overall
Team	W		L	PCT	W		L	PCT
No. 6 Kentucky †	16	–	2	.889	32	–	6	.842
No. 20 Florida	14	–	4	.778	27	–	9	.750
Arkansas	12	–	6	.667	26	–	10	.722
South Carolina	12	–	6	.667	26	–	11	.703
Ole Miss	10	–	8	.556	22	–	14	.611
Alabama	10	–	8	.556	19	–	15	.559
Vanderbilt	10	–	8	.556	19	–	16	.543
Georgia	9	–	9	.500	19	–	15	.559
Texas A&M	8	–	10	.444	16	–	15	.516
Tennessee	8	–	10	.444	16	–	16	.500
Auburn	7	–	11	.389	18	–	14	.563
Mississippi State	6	–	12	.333	16	–	16	.500
LSU	2	–	16	.111	10	–	21	.323
Missouri	2	–	16	.111	8	–	24	.250
† 2017 SEC tournament winner Rankings from AP poll

The 2016–17 Kentucky Wildcats men's basketball team represented the University of Kentucky in the 2016–17 NCAA Division I men's basketball season. The team played its home games in Lexington, Kentucky for the 41st consecutive season at Rupp Arena, with a capacity of 20,500. The team, led by John Calipari in his eighth season as head coach, was a member of the Southeastern Conference.

== Departures ==
Name	Number	Pos.	Height	Weight	Year	Hometown	Notes
Marcus Lee	00	Forward	6'9"	224	Junior	Antioch, California	Transferred to California
Skal Labissière	1	Center	6'11"	205	Freshman	Port-au-Prince, Haiti	Declared for 2016 NBA draft
Tyler Ulis	3	Guard	5'9"	160	Sophomore	Lima, Ohio	Declared for 2016 NBA draft
Charles Matthews	4	Guard	6'6"	189	Freshman	Chicago, Illinois	Transferred to Michigan
Alex Poythress	22	Forward	6'8"	260	Senior	Clarksville, Tennessee	Completed athletic eligibility; received bachelor's degree in May 2015
Jamal Murray	23	Guard	6'5"	225	Freshman	Kitchener, Ontario	Declared for 2016 NBA draft
E. J. Floréal	24	Guard	6'4"	203	Junior	Palo Alto, California	Left program to compete full-time for Kentucky track

== 2016–17 Newcomers ==
SEC recruits at the 2016 McDonald's All-American Boys Game

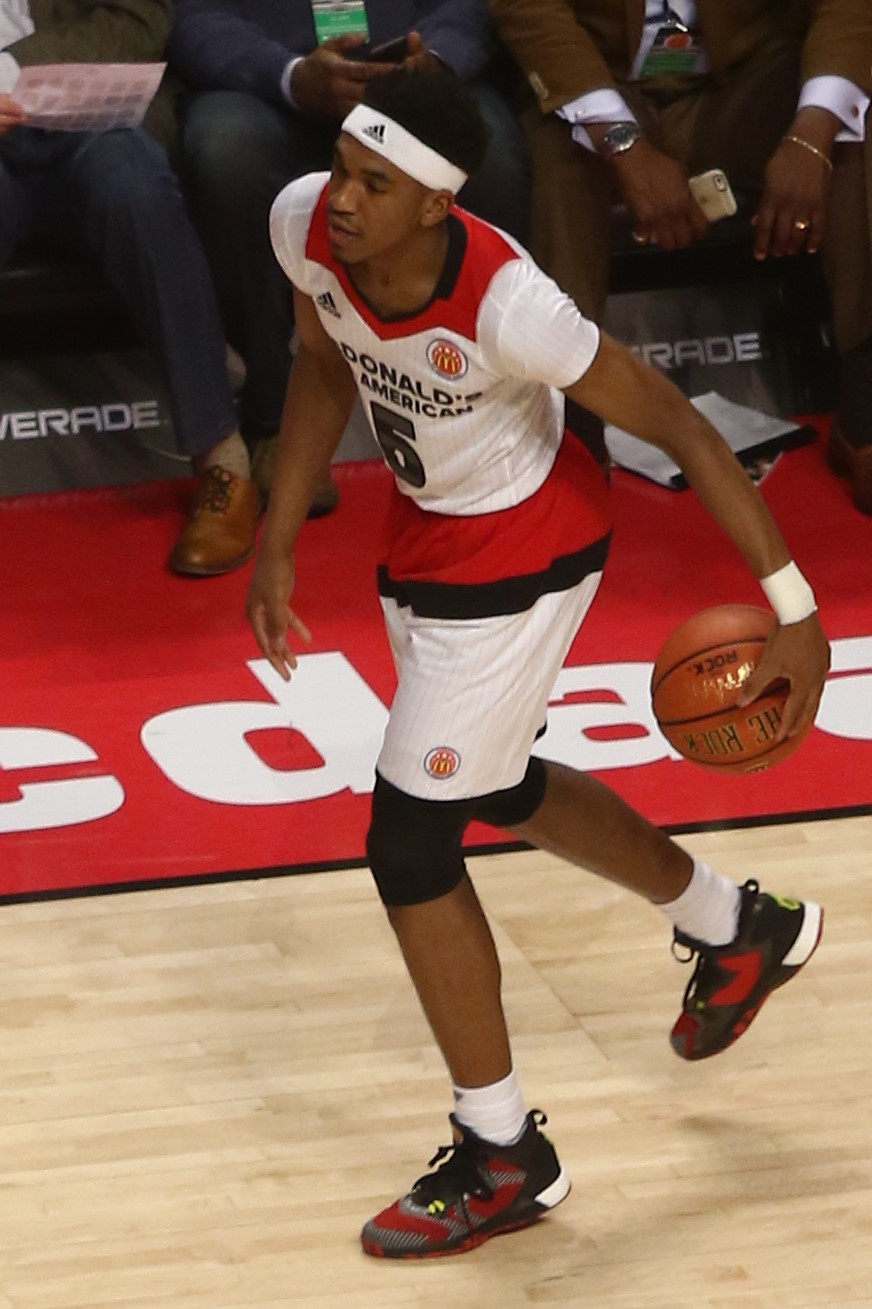
Malik Monk, Kentucky

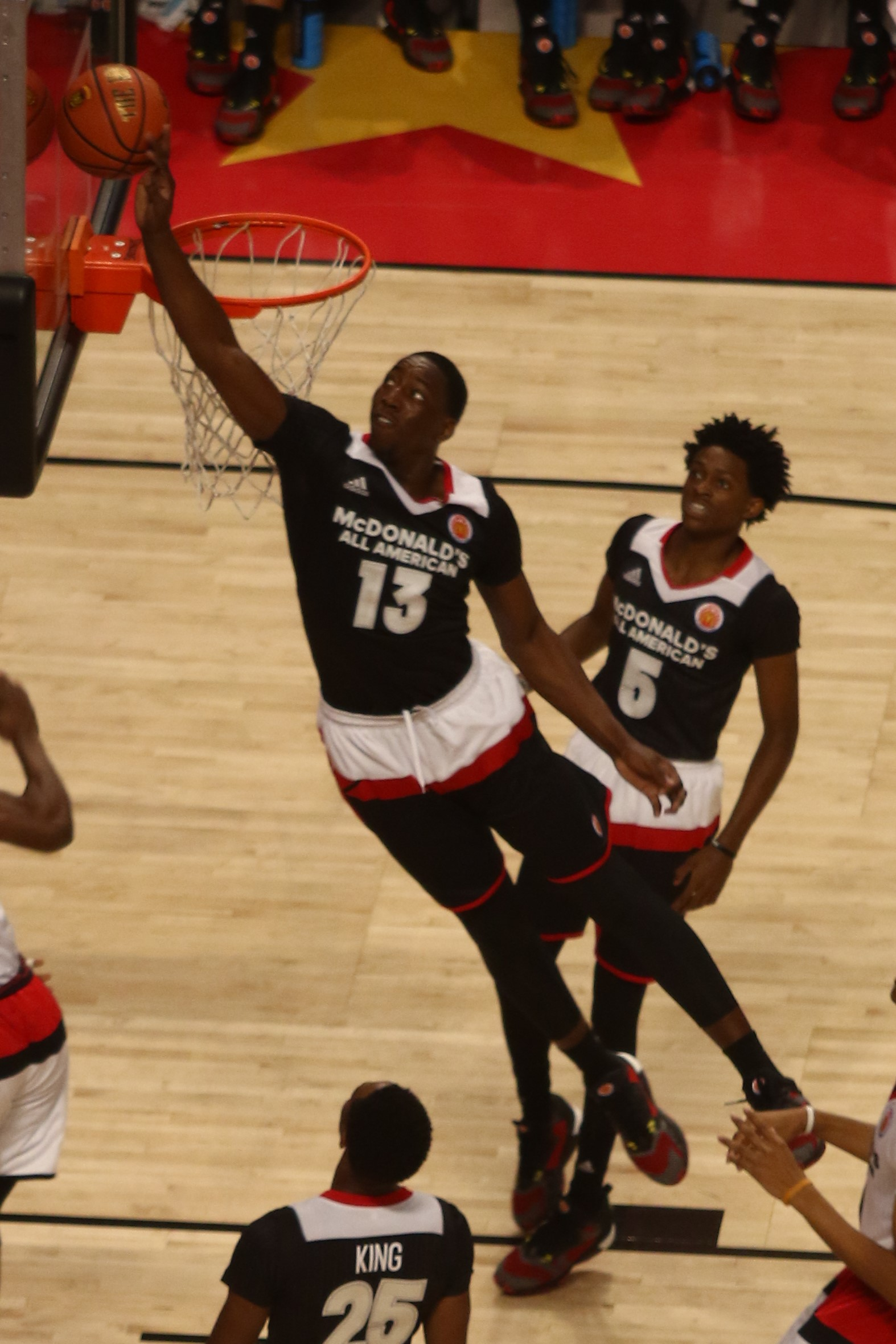
Bam Adebayo, Kentucky

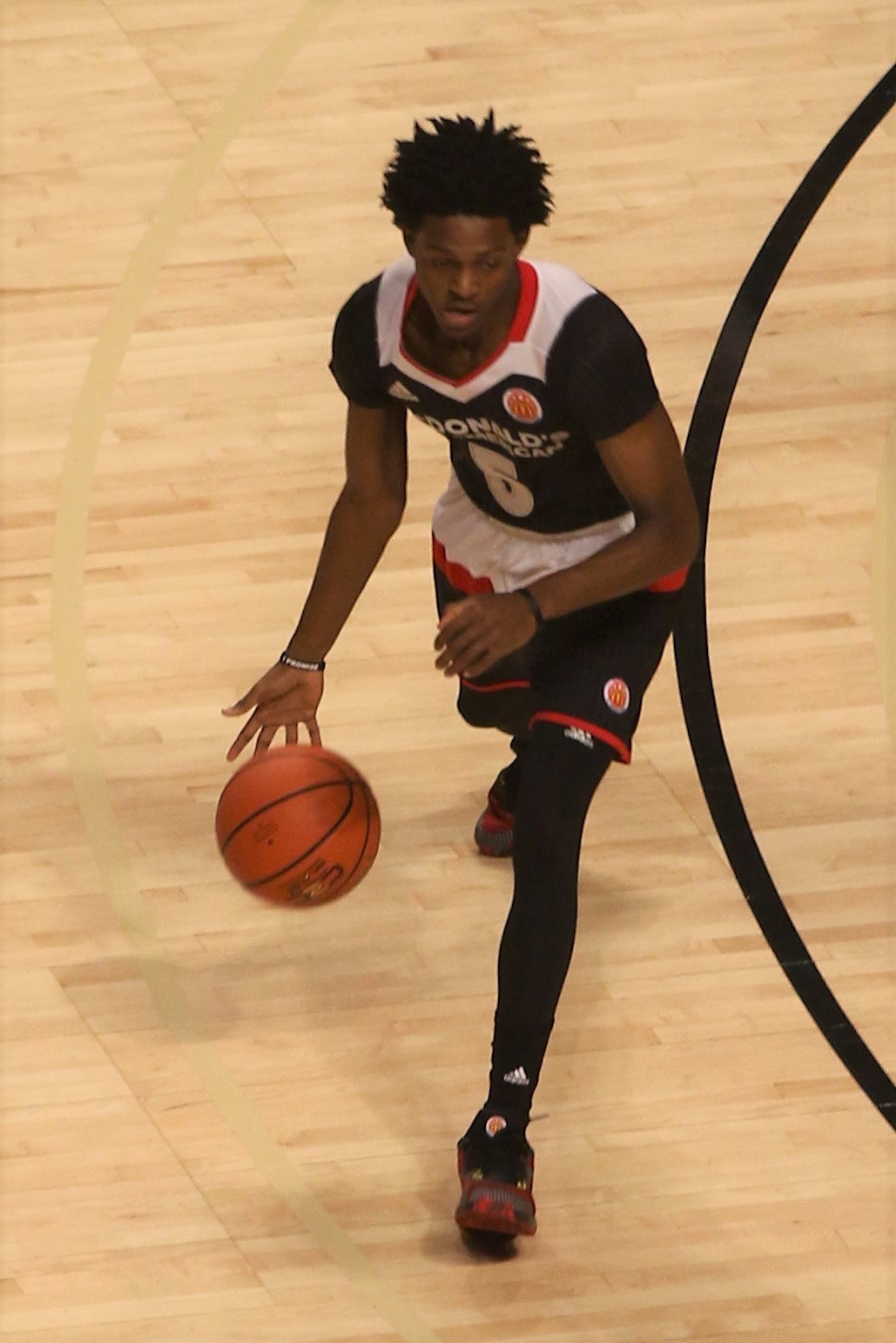
De'Aaron Fox, Kentucky

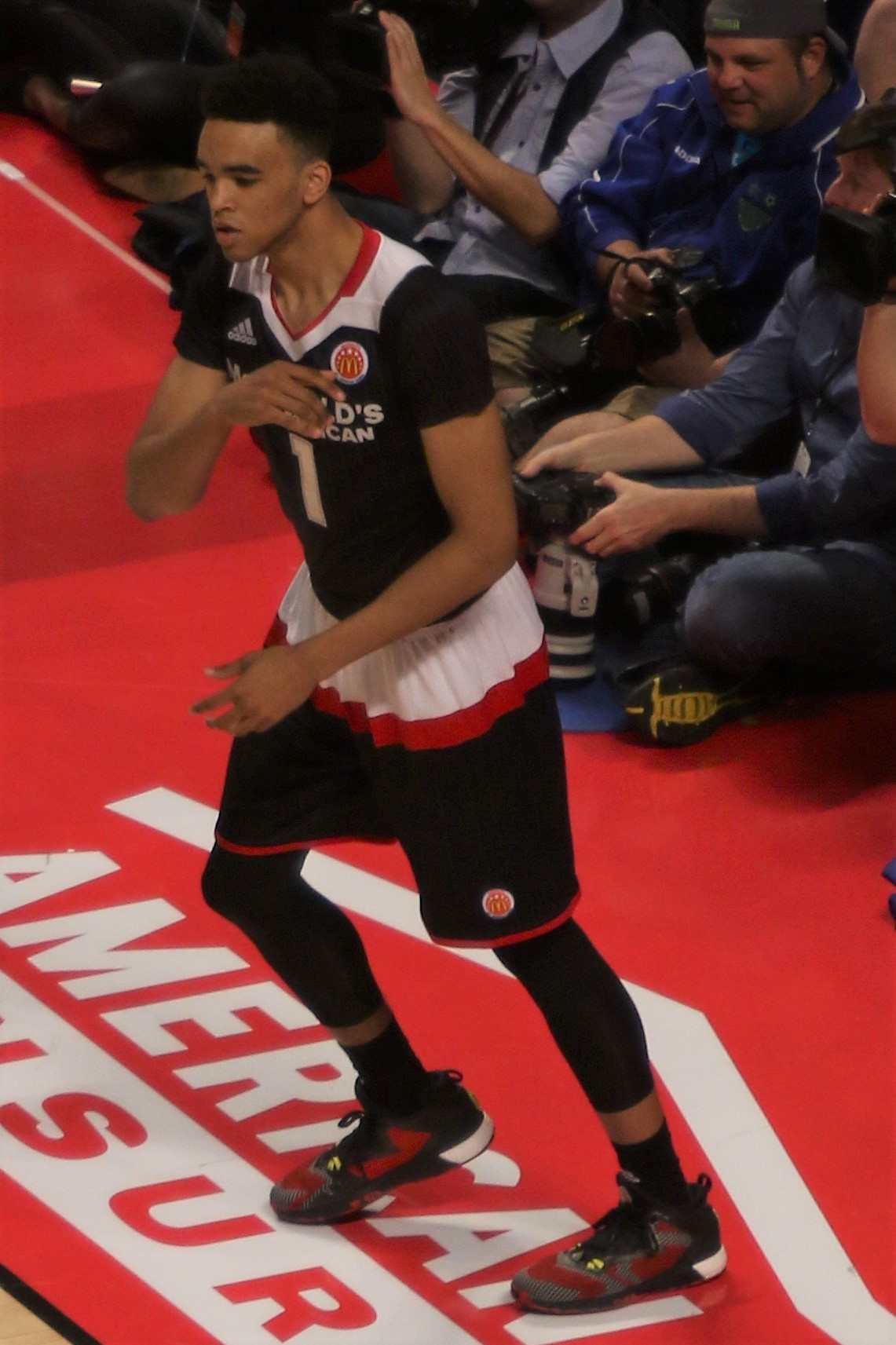
Sacha Killeya-Jones, Kentucky

Edrice Adebayo, nicknamed "Bam" and originally from Pinetown, North Carolina, was a consensus top 15 player in his class. He committed to Kentucky on November 17, live on ESPN's Mike & Mike simulcast radio show. He chose Kentucky over NC State and Auburn. He is ranked in the top 10 by Rivals (No. 6) and ESPN (No. 6). 247Sports (No. 14) and Scout (No. 15) tab him as a top-15 prospect in the 2016 class. He has prior USA Basketball experience and was named a MaxPreps All-American in 2013.

De'Aaron Fox, originally from Katy, Texas, was the second highest rated point guard that Calipari had signed at Kentucky. He committed to Kentucky on November 12, live on ESPNU. He chose Kentucky over Kansas, Louisville, and LSU. He was the nation's consensus top point guard, was ranked the consensus No. 3 overall player by the four main recruiting services Rivals, ESPN, Scout, and 247 Sports.

Wenyen Gabriel, originally from Manchester, New Hampshire, was the third commitment in the Kentucky class. He committed to Kentucky on October 1, live on the radio. He chose Kentucky over Connecticut, Duke, and Maryland. He was a consensus five star prospect, and was ranked the consensus No. 17 overall player by the four main recruiting services Rivals, ESPN, Scout, and 247 Sports.

Sacha Killeya-Jones, originally from Chapel Hill, North Carolina, was the second commitment in the Kentucky class. He committed to Kentucky on October 1, live on the radio. He chose Kentucky over Connecticut, North Carolina, and Virginia. He was a consensus four star prospect, and was ranked the consensus No. 36 overall player by the four main recruiting services Rivals, ESPN, Scout, and 247 Sports.

Malik Monk, originally from Lepanto, Arkansas but attending high school in Bentonville, Arkansas, was the second highest rated shooting guard that Calipari signed at Kentucky. He committed to Kentucky on November 18. He chose Kentucky over Arkansas where his brother, Marcus Monk, played college basketball and football. He was a consensus five star prospect, and was ranked the consensus No. 5 overall player by the four main recruiting services Rivals, ESPN, Scout, and 247 Sports.

College recruiting information
Name	Hometown	School	Height	Weight	Commit date
Edrice Adebayo; PF	Pinetown, North Carolina	High Point Christian Academy	6 ft 9 in (2.06 m)	230 lb (100 kg)	Nov 17, 2015
Edrice Adebayo; PF	Recruit ratings: Scout: Rivals: 247Sports: ESPN:				
De'Aaron Fox; PG	Katy, Texas	Cypress Lakes	6 ft 4 in (1.93 m)	170 lb (77 kg)	Nov 12, 2015
De'Aaron Fox; PG	Recruit ratings: Scout: Rivals: 247Sports: ESPN:				
Wenyen Gabriel; PF	Manchester, New Hampshire	Wilbraham & Monson	6 ft 9 in (2.06 m)	203 lb (92 kg)	Oct 1, 2015
Wenyen Gabriel; PF	Recruit ratings: Scout: Rivals: 247Sports: ESPN:				
Sacha Killeya-Jones; PF	Chapel Hill, North Carolina	Virginia Episcopal	6 ft 10 in (2.08 m)	200 lb (91 kg)	Aug 19, 2015
Sacha Killeya-Jones; PF	Recruit ratings: Scout: Rivals: 247Sports: ESPN:				
Malik Monk; SG	Lepanto, Arkansas	Bentonville	6 ft 2 in (1.88 m)	185 lb (84 kg)	Nov 18, 2015
Malik Monk; SG	Recruit ratings: Scout: Rivals: 247Sports: ESPN:				
Overall recruit ranking:
Note: In many cases, Scout, Rivals, 247Sports, On3, and ESPN may conflict in their listings of height and weight.; In these cases, the average was taken. ESPN grades are on a 100-point scale.; Sources: "Kentucky 2016 Basketball Commitments". Rivals.; "2016 Kentucky Basketball Commits". Scout.; "ESPN". ESPN.; "Scout.com Team Recruiting Rankings". Scout.; "2016 Team Ranking". Rivals.

== Pre-season ==
=== Roster ===
On April 1 the University of Kentucky held a press conference for Murray as he declared himself eligible for the 2016 NBA draft, and would forgo his remaining eligibility by signing with an agent. On April 5 Labissiere declared himself eligible for the draft, and would forgo his remaining eligibility by signing with an agent. On April 6 the University of Kentucky held a press conference for Ulis as he declared himself eligible for the draft, and would forgo his remaining eligibility by signing with an agent. On May 18 Matthews announced that he would transfer from Kentucky and finish his remaining three years of eligibility at a school that was to be chosen; the following month, Matthews announced that he would go to Michigan. On May 25 Briscoe and Lee withdrew their names from the draft, but Lee decided to transfer for his final year of eligibility to a then-undetermined school, which ultimately proved to be California. On August 9, reserve guard E. J. Floréal announced that he would leave the UK basketball program to compete full-time for the school in track. Floréal, who had one year of remaining eligibility in basketball but would have two years in track, was a local and regional track champion in high school, and his father was UK's head track coach at the time.

=== Accolades and rankings ===
The Southeastern Conference preseason media poll was released at the SEC Media Days in October, it predicted that Kentucky would win the championship. Adebayo and Fox were named to the All-SEC First Team while Briscoe and Monk were named to the All-SEC Second Team.

USA Today announced its initial coaches poll on October 15 with Kentucky ranked as No. 4 in the country. The Associated Press announced on October 31 that Kentucky was ranked No. 2 to start the season in its initial poll of the season.

=== Events ===
On July 18 Kentucky released the non-conference portion of its schedule. The schedule is highlighted by marquee match-ups at Rupp Arena and across the country. Kentucky will travel to New York to play Michigan State in the annual Champions Classic, to the Bahamas to play Arizona State, back to New York to play Hofstra, to Las Vegas to play against North Carolina in the annual CBS Sports Classic, and finally to Louisville to face in-state rival Louisville.. Kentucky will also host UCLA for the first time as well as Kansas in the Big 12/SEC Challenge.

Tickets for Big Blue Madness, Kentucky's version of Midnight Madness went on sale and sold out on September 30.

Big Blue Madness took place on October 14. The event debuted the team for the 2016–17 season. It included player introductions, a speech by Calipari, and a scrimmage.

== 2017–18 newcomers ==
Nick Richards, a native of Kingston, Jamaica living in Queens, New York, was the first commitment in the Kentucky class. He committed to Kentucky on November 10 at a press conference at his high school. He chose Kentucky over Arizona and Syracuse. He was a consensus five star prospect, and was ranked the consensus No. 14 overall player by the four main recruiting services.

P. J. Washington, a Dallas native attending school in Las Vegas, Nevada, was the second commitment in the Kentucky class. He committed to Kentucky on November 10 live on ESPNU. He chose Kentucky over North Carolina and UNLV. He was a consensus five star prospect, and was ranked the consensus No. 15 overall player by the four main recruiting services.

Shai Gilgeous-Alexander, originally from Hamilton, Ontario and attending school in Chattanooga, Tennessee, was the third commitment in the Kentucky class. He committed to Kentucky on November 14 through a message on Twitter. He was a consensus top fifty player, ranked No. 42 by the four main recruiting services Rivals, ESPN, Scout, and 24/7 Sports.

Quade Green, from Philadelphia, Pennsylvania, was the fourth commitment in the Kentucky class. He signed his National Letter of Intent on November 16, the last day of the early signing period, but did not reveal his choice between Kentucky and Syracuse until an event at his high school on November 19 - with his mother Tamika Johnson by his side. He was a consensus top-25 player and ranked as a five-star player by the four main recruiting services Rivals, ESPN, Scout, and 24/7 Sports.

Hamidou Diallo, a Queens native who graduated from a Connecticut school in spring 2016, announced on January 7, 2017, that he would enroll at UK for the start of the school's spring semester the following week. While he was eligible to play immediately, he redshirted the spring semester and is set to begin play as a freshman in 2017–18.

Jemarl Baker, a native of Eastvale, California, was the seventh commitment in the Kentucky recruiting class. He announced his decision on April 11 via a story posted on Scout.com by Evan Daniels. Baker originally committed to Cuonzo Martin at California, before Martin left the school to coach Missouri. He averaged 17.1 points, 4.1 assists, 3.5 rebounds and 1.8 steals for Roosevelt High School in Corona, Calif., and he quickly emerged as one of the Wildcats' top backcourt targets after their season ended last month. Scout.com ranks Baker as the No. 86 overall prospect in the 2017 class.

UK's final commitment came on May 6, when Tampa product Kevin Knox II announced he would come to the school. Kentucky beat out Duke, Florida State, North Carolina, and Missouri for Knox's signature.

College recruiting information
Name	Hometown	School	Height	Weight	Commit date
Shai Gilgeous-Alexander; G	Hamilton, Ontario	Hamilton Heights Christian (TN)	6 ft 4 in (1.93 m)	160 lb (73 kg)	Nov 14, 2016
Shai Gilgeous-Alexander; G	Recruit ratings: Scout: Rivals: 247Sports: ESPN:				
Jemarl Baker; SG	Eastvale, California	Roosevelt High School	6 ft 4 in (1.93 m)	180 lb (82 kg)	Apr 11, 2017
Jemarl Baker; SG	Recruit ratings: Scout: Rivals: 247Sports: ESPN:				
Hamidou Diallo; SG	Queens, New York	Putnam Science Academy	6 ft 5 in (1.96 m)	195 lb (88 kg)	Jan 7, 2017
Hamidou Diallo; SG	Recruit ratings: Scout: Rivals: 247Sports: ESPN:				
Quade Green; PG	Philadelphia, Pennsylvania	Neumann–Goretti	6 ft 1 in (1.85 m)	170 lb (77 kg)	Nov 16, 2016
Quade Green; PG	Recruit ratings: Scout: Rivals: 247Sports: ESPN:				
Kevin Knox II; SF	Tampa, Florida	Tampa Catholic High School	6 ft 8 in (2.03 m)	205 lb (93 kg)	May 6, 2017
Kevin Knox II; SF	Recruit ratings: Scout: Rivals: 247Sports: ESPN:				
Nick Richards; C	Kingston, Jamaica	St. Patrick	6 ft 11 in (2.11 m)	250 lb (110 kg)	Nov 10, 2016
Nick Richards; C	Recruit ratings: Scout: Rivals: 247Sports: ESPN:				
P. J. Washington; PF	Dallas, Texas	Findlay Prep	6 ft 8 in (2.03 m)	225 lb (102 kg)	Nov 10, 2016
P. J. Washington; PF	Recruit ratings: Scout: Rivals: 247Sports: ESPN:				
Jarred Vanderbilt; SF	Houston, Texas	Victory Prep	6 ft 8 in (2.03 m)	215 lb (98 kg)	Dec 23, 2016
Jarred Vanderbilt; SF	Recruit ratings: Scout: Rivals: 247Sports: ESPN:				
Overall recruit ranking:
Note: In many cases, Scout, Rivals, 247Sports, On3, and ESPN may conflict in their listings of height and weight.; In these cases, the average was taken. ESPN grades are on a 100-point scale.; Sources: "Kentucky 2017 Basketball Commitments". Rivals.; "2017 Kentucky Basketball Commits". Scout.; "2017 Kentucky Basketball Commits". ESPN.; "Scout.com Team Recruiting Rankings". Scout.; "2017 Team Ranking". Rivals.

== Roster ==
2016–17 Kentucky Wildcats men's basketball team
Players
Coaches

Pos.	#	Name	Height	Weight	Year	Previous school	Hometown
G	0	De'Aaron Fox	6 ft 3 in (1.91 m)	187 lb (85 kg)	Fr	Cypress Lakes	Houston, Texas
F	1	Sacha Killeya-Jones	6 ft 10 in (2.08 m)	230 lb (104 kg)	Fr	Virginia Episcopal	Chapel Hill, North Carolina
C	3	Bam Adebayo	6 ft 10 in (2.08 m)	260 lb (118 kg)	Fr	High Point Christian Academy	Washington, North Carolina
G	4	Hamidou Diallo (redshirt)	6 ft 5 in (1.96 m)	190 lb (86 kg)	Fr	Putnam Science Academy	Queens, New York
G	5	Malik Monk	6 ft 3 in (1.91 m)	200 lb (91 kg)	Fr	Bentonville	Lepanto, Arkansas
G	10	Jonny David (W)	6 ft 2 in (1.88 m)	183 lb (83 kg)	So	Mt. Lebanon	Pittsburgh, Pennsylvania
G	11	Mychal Mulder	6 ft 4 in (1.93 m)	185 lb (84 kg)	Sr	Vincennes	Windsor, Ontario
G	13	Isaiah Briscoe	6 ft 3 in (1.91 m)	210 lb (95 kg)	So	Roselle Catholic	Newark, New Jersey
C	14	Tai Wynyard	6 ft 10 in (2.08 m)	254 lb (115 kg)	RS Fr	Rangitoto College	Auckland, New Zealand
C	15	Isaac Humphries	7 ft 0 in (2.13 m)	255 lb (116 kg)	So	La Lumiere School	Sydney, Australia
G	20	Brad Calipari	6 ft 0 in (1.83 m)	178 lb (81 kg)	Fr	MacDuffie School	Franklin Lakes, New Jersey
G	25	Dominique Hawkins	6 ft 0 in (1.83 m)	191 lb (87 kg)	Sr	Madison Central	Richmond, Kentucky
G	30	Dillon Pulliam (W)	6 ft 3 in (1.91 m)	195 lb (88 kg)	RS So	Transylvania	Cynthiana, Kentucky
F	32	Wenyen Gabriel	6 ft 9 in (2.06 m)	213 lb (97 kg)	Fr	Wilbraham & Monson	Manchester, New Hampshire
F	35	Derek Willis	6 ft 9 in (2.06 m)	228 lb (103 kg)	Sr	Bullitt East	Mount Washington, Kentucky

Head coach

- John Calipari (Clarion)

Assistant coach(es)

- Kenny Payne (Louisville)
- Tony Barbee (UMass)
- Joel Justus (UNC-Wilmington)
- John Robic (Denison)

Legend

- (C) Team captain
- (S) Suspended
- (I) Ineligible
- (W) Walk-on
- Injured
- Current redshirt

Roster
Last update: March 7, 2017

- Roster is subject to change as/if players transfer or leave the program for other reasons.

=== Depth chart ===
Pos.	Starting 5	Bench 1	Bench 2
C	Bam Adebayo	Isaac Humphries	Tai Wynyard
PF	Wenyen Gabriel	Sacha Killeya-Jones
SF	Isaiah Briscoe	Derek Willis	Dillon Pulliam
SG	Malik Monk	Mychal Mulder	Johnny David
PG	De'Aaron Fox	Dominique Hawkins	Brad Calipari

== Schedule and results ==
Date time, TV	Rank^{#}	Opponent^{#}	Result	Record	High points	High rebounds	High assists	Site (attendance) city, state
Exhibition
October 30, 2016*; 7:00 pm, SECN	No. 2	Clarion	W 108–51	0–0	15 – Monk	14 – Adebayo	11 – Briscoe	Rupp Arena (20,099); Lexington, KY
November 6, 2016*; 7:00 pm, SECN	No. 2	Asbury	W 156–63	0–0	25 – Fox	12 – Humphries	7 – Briscoe	Rupp Arena (21,394); Lexington, KY
Regular Season
November 11, 2016*; 7:00 pm, SECN	No. 2	Stephen F. Austin	W 87–64	1–0	17 – Briscoe	8 – Humphries	12 – Fox	Rupp Arena (22,683); Lexington, KY
November 13, 2016*; 6:00 pm, ESPN2	No. 2	Canisius; Bluegrass Showcase	W 93–69	2–0	21 – Fox, Briscoe	11 – Adebayo	3 – Fox	Rupp Arena (22,009); Lexington, KY
November 15, 2016*; 7:00 pm, ESPN	No. 2	vs. No. 13 Michigan State; Champions Classic	W 69–48	3–0	23 – Monk	6 – Monk	6 – Fox	Madison Square Garden (19,812); New York, NY
November 20, 2016*; 9:00 pm, ESPNU	No. 2	Duquesne; Bluegrass Showcase	W 93–59	4–0	16 – Fox	8 – Adebayo	6 – Fox	Rupp Arena (21,327); Lexington, KY
November 23, 2016*; 1:00 pm, SECN	No. 1	Cleveland State; Bluegrass Showcase	W 101–70	5–0	23 – Monk	10 – Gabriel	11 – Fox	Rupp Arena (22,441); Lexington, KY
November 25, 2016*; 7:00 pm, SECN	No. 1	UT Martin; Bluegrass Showcase	W 111–76	6–0	26 – Monk	12 – Adebayo	9 – Hawkins	Rupp Arena (23,324); Lexington, KY
November 28, 2016*; 7:00 pm, ESPN2	No. 1	vs. Arizona State; Atlantis Showcase	W 115–69	7–0	23 – Monk	11 – Fox	10 – Fox	Imperial Arena (1,200); Nassau, BAH
December 3, 2016*; 1:30 pm, CBS	No. 1	No. 11 UCLA	L 92–97	7–1	24 – Monk	13 – Adebayo	9 – Fox	Rupp Arena (23,976); Lexington, KY
December 7, 2016*; 8:00 pm, SECN	No. 6	Valparaiso	W 87–63	8–1	16 – Adebayo	7 – Adebayo, Fox, Mulder	5 – Fox	Rupp Arena (21,805); Lexington, KY
December 11, 2016*; 3:00 pm, ESPN	No. 6	vs. Hofstra; Brooklyn Hoops Winter Festival	W 96–73	9–1	20 – Monk	8 – Willis	6 – Briscoe	Barclays Center (7,514); Brooklyn, NY
December 17, 2016*; 5:45 pm, CBS	No. 6	vs. No. 7 North Carolina; CBS Sports Classic/Rivalry	W 103–100	10–1	47 – Monk	7 – Tie	10 – Fox	T-Mobile Arena (19,298); Las Vegas, NV
December 21, 2016*; 7:00 pm, ESPN	No. 6	at No. 10 Louisville; The Battle for the Bluegrass	L 70–73	10–2	21 – Fox	9 – Adebayo, Willis	3 – Briscoe, Fox	KFC Yum! Center (22,783); Louisville, KY
December 29, 2016; 7:00 pm, ESPN2	No. 8	at Ole Miss	W 99–76	11–2 (1–0)	34 – Monk	10 – Briscoe	11 – Briscoe	The Pavilion (9,086); Oxford, MS
January 3, 2017; 9:00 pm, ESPN	No. 6	Texas A&M	W 100–58	12–2 (2–0)	26 – Monk	6 – Humphries	7 – Briscoe	Rupp Arena (23,455); Lexington, KY
January 7, 2017; 8:30 pm, SECN	No. 6	Arkansas	W 97–71	13–2 (3–0)	27 – Fox	8 – Briscoe	6 – Fox	Rupp Arena (24,322); Lexington, KY
January 10, 2017; 7:00 pm, ESPN	No. 6	at Vanderbilt	W 87–81	14–2 (4–0)	23 – Briscoe	7 – Briscoe	5 – Briscoe	Memorial Gymnasium (12,707); Nashville, TN
January 14, 2017; 4:00 pm, ESPN	No. 6	Auburn	W 92–72	15–2 (5–0)	24 – Monk	16 – Gabriel	6 – Monk	Rupp Arena (24,372); Lexington, KY
January 17, 2017; 7:00 pm, ESPN	No. 5	at Mississippi State	W 88–81	16–2 (6–0)	21 – Fox	8 – Gabriel	5 – Fox	Humphrey Coliseum (9,768); Starkville, MS
January 21, 2017; 6:00 pm, ESPN	No. 5	No. 24 South Carolina	W 85–69	17–2 (7–0)	27 – Monk	7 – Willis	7 – Hawkins	Rupp Arena (24,389); Lexington, KY
January 24, 2017; 9:00 pm, ESPN	No. 4	at Tennessee; Rivalry	L 80–82	17–3 (7–1)	25 – Monk	14 – Briscoe	5 – Briscoe	Thompson–Boling Arena (19,349); Knoxville, TN
January 28, 2017*; 6:15 pm, ESPN	No. 4	No. 2 Kansas; Big 12/SEC Challenge/ESPN College GameDay	L 73–79	17–4	18 – Monk, Willis	8 – Adebayo, Briscoe	6 – Briscoe	Rupp Arena (24,418); Lexington, KY
January 31, 2017; 9:00 pm, ESPN	No. 8	Georgia	W 90–81 ^{OT}	18–4 (8–1)	37 – Monk	11 – Briscoe	8 – Briscoe	Rupp Arena (23,814); Lexington, KY
February 4, 2017; 8:15 pm, ESPN	No. 8	at No. 24 Florida; Rivalry/ESPN College GameDay	L 66–88	18–5 (8–2)	19 – Fox	7 – Adebayo	3 – Briscoe	O'Connell Center (11,171); Gainesville, FL
February 7, 2017; 7:00 pm, ESPN	No. 15	LSU	W 92–85	19–5 (9–2)	23 – Gabriel	9 – Adebayo	6 – Fox	Rupp Arena (23,657); Lexington, KY
February 11, 2017; 1:00 pm, CBS	No. 15	at Alabama	W 67–58	20–5 (10–2)	17 – Monk	11 – Briscoe	4 – Briscoe	Coleman Coliseum (15,383); Tuscaloosa, AL
February 14, 2017; 7:00 pm, ESPN	No. 13	Tennessee; Rivalry	W 83–58	21–5 (11–2)	20 – Monk	12 – Adebayo	6 – Fox, Briscoe	Rupp Arena (24,391); Lexington, KY
February 18, 2017; 6:00 pm, ESPN	No. 13	at Georgia	W 82–77	22–5 (12–2)	16 – Fox, Monk	12 – Willis	5 – Fox, Monk	Stegeman Coliseum (10,523); Athens, GA
February 21, 2017; 9:00 pm, SECN	No. 11	at Missouri	W 72–62	23–5 (13–2)	22 – Adebayo	15 – Adebayo	4 – Fox	Mizzou Arena (11,574); Columbia, MO
February 25, 2017; 2:00 pm, CBS	No. 11	No. 13 Florida; Rivalry	W 76–66	24–5 (14–2)	33 – Monk	15 – Adebayo	5 – Monk	Rupp Arena (24,431); Lexington, KY
February 28, 2017; 9:00 pm, ESPN	No. 9	Vanderbilt	W 73–67	25–5 (15–2)	27 – Monk	8 – Willis	6 – Briscoe	Rupp Arena (24,036); Lexington, KY
March 4, 2017; 12:00 pm, CBS	No. 9	at Texas A&M	W 71–63	26–5 (16–2)	19 – Fox	8 – Adebayo	8 – Briscoe	Reed Arena (9,528); College Station, TX
SEC Tournament
March 10, 2017; 1:00 pm, SECN	(1) No. 8	vs. (8) Georgia; Quarterfinals	W 71–60	27–5	20 – Briscoe	11 – Willis	4 – Fox	Bridgestone Arena (18,130); Nashville, TN
March 11, 2017; 12:00 pm, ESPN	(1) No. 8	vs. (5) Alabama; Semifinals	W 79–74	28–5	28 – Fox	9 – Adebayo	3 – Briscoe	Bridgestone Arena (19,196); Nashville, TN
March 12, 2017; 12:00 pm, ESPN	(1) No. 8	vs. (3) Arkansas; Championship	W 82–65	29–5	18 – Fox	9 – Adebayo	3 – Monk	Bridgestone Arena (19,953); Nashville, TN
NCAA tournament
March 17, 2017*; 9:40 pm, CBS	(2 S) No. 6	vs. (15 S) Northern Kentucky; First Round	W 79–70	30–5	19 – Fox	18 – Adebayo	3 – Fox, Wills	Bankers Life Fieldhouse (18,269); Indianapolis, IN
March 19, 2017*; 2:40 pm, CBS	(2 S) No. 6	vs. (10 S) No. 19 Wichita State; Second Round	W 65–62	31–5	14 – Monk, Fox	10 – Adebayo	4 – Monk	Bankers Life Fieldhouse (18,293); Indianapolis, IN
March 24, 2017*; 9:39 pm, CBS	(2 S) No. 6	vs. (3 S) No. 8 UCLA; Sweet Sixteen	W 86–75	32–5	39 – Fox	8 – Adebayo	5 – Adebayo	FedEx Forum (17,532); Memphis, TN
March 26, 2017*; 5:05 pm, CBS	(2 S) No. 6	vs. (1 S) No. 5 North Carolina; Elite Eight	L 73–75	32–6	13 – Adebayo, Fox	7 – Adebayo	8 – Briscoe	FedEx Forum (16,412); Memphis, TN
*Non-conference game. ^{#}Rankings from AP Poll. (#) Tournament seedings in parentheses. All times are in Eastern Time.

== Honors ==
=== Weekly Awards ===
On November 14 Fox was named SEC Freshman of the Week following a 21-point career-high against Canisius and a 12-assist career-high against Stephen F. Austin.

=== National Awards ===
On March 28, 2017, Malik Monk was voted consensus Second Team All-American by each of the NCAA's four recognized organizations (AP, National Association of Basketball Coaches, United States Basketball Writers Association, Sporting News) it uses to determine consensus status. On April 7, 2017, Malik Monk won the Jerry West Award, which is awarded to the nation's top shooting guard of the year. Monk beat out Duke's Luke Kennard, UCLA's Bryce Alford, and Creighton's Marcus Foster for the award.

== Rankings ==
Ranking movements Legend: ██ Increase in ranking ██ Decrease in ranking ( ) = First-place votes
	Week																				
Poll	Pre	1	2	3	4	5	6	7	8	9	10	11	12	13	14	15	16	17	18	19	Final
AP	2 (2)	2 (2)	2 (1)	1 (42)	1 (40)	6	6	6	8	6	6	5	4	8	15	13	11	9	8	6	Not released
Coaches	4 (2)	4 (2)	2 (2)	1 (20)	1 (23)	7	7	5	8	6	6	5	4	6	12	11	10	9	8	5	5
