= James Anderson (basketball) =

American basketball player (born 1989)

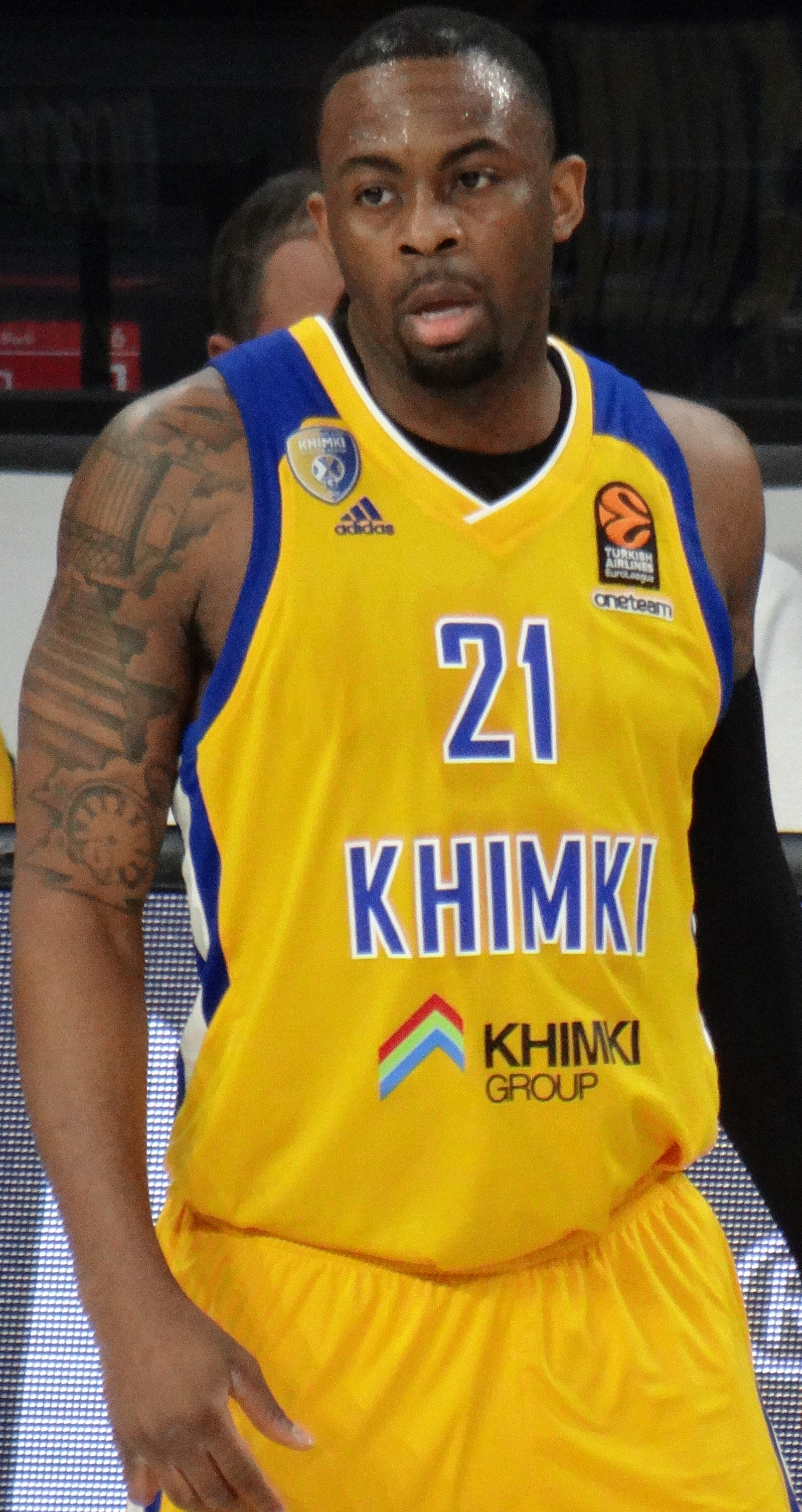
- Anderson with Khimki in 2018

Free agent
- Position: Small forward / shooting guard

Personal information
- Born: March 25, 1989 (age 37) El Dorado, Arkansas, U.S.
- Listed height: 6 ft 6 in (1.98 m)
- Listed weight: 215 lb (98 kg)

Career information
- High school: Junction City (Junction City, Arkansas)
- College: Oklahoma State (2007–2010)
- NBA draft: 2010: 1st round, 20th overall pick
- Drafted by: San Antonio Spurs
- Playing career: 2010–present

Career history
- 2010–2012: San Antonio Spurs
- 2011: →Austin Toros
- 2013: Houston Rockets
- 2013–2014: Philadelphia 76ers
- 2014–2015: Žalgiris Kaunas
- 2015–2016: Sacramento Kings
- 2016–2017: Darüşşafaka
- 2017–2018: Khimki Moscow
- 2018–2022: Anadolu Efes
- 2022–2023: Murcia
- 2023–2024: Manisa BB
- 2024–2025: Al-Ula

Career highlights
- 2× EuroLeague champion (2021, 2022); 2× Turkish League champion (2019, 2021); Lithuanian LKL champion (2015); LKL All-Star (2015); LKF Cup winner (2015); Consensus second-team All-American (2010); Big 12 Player of the Year (2010); First-team All-Big 12 (2010); 2× Second-team All-Big 12 (2008, 2009); Third-team Parade All-American (2007); McDonald's All-American (2007); 2× Arkansas Mr. Basketball (2006, 2007)
- Stats at NBA.com
- Stats at Basketball Reference
Medals
Representing United States
Men's basketball
Summer Universiade
Bronze medal – third place	2009 Belgrade	Team competition

James Lee Anderson (born March 25, 1989) is an American professional basketball player who last played for Al-Ula the Saudi Basketball League (SBL). He played college basketball for the Oklahoma State Cowboys. In 2010, Anderson was named Big 12 Conference Men's Basketball Player of the Year and a first team All-American. He was selected by the San Antonio Spurs with the 20th overall pick in the 2010 NBA draft.

== High school career ==
Anderson attended Junction City High School in Junction City, Arkansas. As a senior in 2006–07, Anderson led the Dragons to the Arkansas Class 2A state championship, scoring 43 points in the title game. Anderson was named the Gatorade Player of the Year for Arkansas and named to the McDonald's and Parade All-American teams.

Considered a four-star recruit by Rivals.com, Anderson was listed as the No. 10 small forward and the No. 32 player in the nation in 2007.

== College career ==
Anderson chose Oklahoma State University and made an immediate impact, scoring 29 points in his first collegiate game, a 104–48 win over Prairie View. Anderson would continue his strong play, averaging 13.3 points per game. He was named honorable mention All-Big 12 selection and a member of the Big 12 All-Rookie team.

James Anderson continued to progress as a sophomore, raising his scoring average to 18.2 points per game and surpassed the 1,000 career point milestone in just his second year. He was named Academic All-Big 12 and a second team All-Conference pick.

Following his sophomore season, Anderson was selected to represent the United States in the 2009 World University Games in Belgrade, Serbia. Team USA won the Bronze medal under coach Bo Ryan.

Anderson's junior year saw him become the top performer in the Big 12 Conference. Anderson paced the conference in scoring, averaging over 24 points per game in conference play. He led the Cowboys to a 9–7 league record. At the conclusion of the Big 12 regular season, James Anderson was named Big 12 Player of the Year. The Sporting News also named Anderson a first team All-American.

== Professional career ==
Anderson was drafted by the San Antonio Spurs in the 2010 NBA draft with the 20th overall pick.

Anderson appeared in six games early in the season, before being sidelined with a stress fracture in the fifth metatarsal of his right foot. On January 26, 2011, he was assigned to the Austin Toros of the NBA D-League, in order to get back into playing form. Anderson played two games for the Toros, before being recalled by the Spurs three days later. However, on February 7, he was assigned to the Toros once again, where he appeared in five more games, before being recalled by the Spurs on February 23. The Spurs did not exercise his player option during the summer, and he became a free agent.

In September 2012, Anderson signed with the Atlanta Hawks. He was waived by the Hawks on October 27, 2012. Afterwards, Anderson was acquired by the Bakersfield Jam of the NBA D-League, then traded to the Rio Grande Valley Vipers.

On November 21, 2012, Anderson signed with the Spurs for a second stint, hoping to fill the void on the small forward position with both Kawhi Leonard and Stephen Jackson out with injuries. He selected the #11 jersey since Nando De Colo was wearing his previous number, #25.

On December 20, 2012, Anderson was waived by the Spurs. He was reacquired by the Rio Grande Valley Vipers on December 25, 2012.

On January 2, 2013, Anderson was signed by the Houston Rockets. On July 15, 2013, he was waived by the Rockets.

On July 16, 2013, Anderson was claimed off of waivers by the Philadelphia 76ers. On November 13, 2013, he scored a career high 36 points in a 123–117 overtime win against the Houston Rockets. He hit a clutch three pointer with 6.6 seconds left on the clock to send the game into overtime. On June 30, 2014, Anderson was waived by the 76ers.

On August 5, 2014, Anderson signed a one-year deal with Žalgiris Kaunas of Lithuania. He helped Žalgiris win the LKL championship for the 5th consecutive year.

On July 16, 2015, Anderson signed with the Sacramento Kings.

On July 21, 2016, Anderson signed a two-year deal with Turkish club Darüşşafaka.

On July 16, 2017, Anderson signed a two-year deal with Russian club Khimki.

On July 12, 2018, Anderson parted ways with Khimki and joined the Turkish club Anadolu Efes, signing a two-year deal. He averaged 5.4 points and 3.2 rebounds per game during the 2019–20 season. Anderson re-signed with the club on July 16, 2020. He extended his contract on June 24, 2021. On June 17, 2022, Anderson officially parted ways with the Turkish club after four seasons, having won two EuroLeague titles, as well as two Turkish championships during his stint.

On June 25, 2022, he has signed with UCAM Murcia of the Spanish Liga ACB.

On June 27, 2023, Anderson signed with Manisa BB of the Turkish Basketbol Süper Ligi (BSL).

On August 1, 2024, Anderson signed with Al-Ula of the Saudi Basketball League (SBL).

== Career statistics ==
Legend
GP	Games played	GS	Games started	MPG	Minutes per game
FG%	Field-goal percentage	3P%	3-point field-goal percentage	FT%	Free-throw percentage
RPG	Rebounds per game	APG	Assists per game	SPG	Steals per game
BPG	Blocks per game	PPG	Points per game	PIR	Performance index rating
**Bold**	Career high

=== NBA ===
==== Regular season ====
Year	Team	GP	GS	MPG	FG%	3P%	FT%	RPG	APG	SPG	BPG	PPG
2010–11	San Antonio	26	2	11.0	.383	.391	.778	.9	.7	.1	.2	3.6
2011–12	San Antonio	51	2	11.8	.379	.279	.750	1.5	.8	.2	.0	3.7
2012–13	San Antonio	10	0	9.4	**.440**	**.455**	.778	1.4	.9	.3	.2	3.4
2012–13	Houston	29	2	10.6	.406	.327	**.895**	2.0	1.1	.4	.1	4.0
2013–14	Philadelphia	**80**	**62**	**28.9**	.431	.328	.726	**3.8**	**1.9**	**.9**	**.4**	**10.1**
2015–16	Sacramento	51	15	14.1	.376	.267	.759	1.7	.8	.4	.3	3.5
Career		247	83	17.5	.411	.321	.755	2.3	1.2	.5	.2	5.8

==== Playoffs ====
Year	Team	GP	GS	MPG	FG%	3P%	FT%	RPG	APG	SPG	BPG	PPG
2012	San Antonio	**8**	0	3.9	**.444**	**.500**	**.500**	.6	**.4**	**.1**	.0	**1.4**
2013	Houston	2	0	**9.0**	.200	.000	–	**2.0**	.0	.0	.0	1.0
Career		10	0	4.9	.357	.286	.500	.9	.3	.1	.0	1.3

=== EuroLeague ===
†	Denotes season in which Anderson won the EuroLeague
*	Led the league

Year	Team	GP	GS	MPG	FG%	3P%	FT%	RPG	APG	SPG	BPG	PPG	PIR
2014–15	Žalgiris	24	24	**28.4**	.396	.329	.785	**5.1**	**2.5**	**.9**	**.5**	**14.5**	**13.3**
2016–17	Darüşşafaka	34	24	22.3	.407	.346	.673	3.6	1.3	.6	.4	9.2	7.9
2017–18	Khimki	31	**29**	21.8	.455	.345	.875	2.8	1.3	.6	.3	9.2	8.0
2018–19	Anadolu Efes	37*	20	14.8	.432	.427	.828	2.0	.7	.2	.1	4.8	4.7
2019–20	Anadolu Efes	28*	16	14.2	.429	.318	.750	3.2	.3	.3	.1	3.5	5.1
2020–21†	Anadolu Efes	**41***	17	15.1	.500	.451	.714	2.8	.8	.4	.1	4.2	5.7
2021–22†	Anadolu Efes	28	13	13.5	**.516**	**.455**	**.909**	2.8	.5	.5	.1	3.1	4.5
Career		223	139	18.2	.432	.364	.772	3.1	1.0	.5	.2	6.6	6.8

== See also ==
- 2010 NCAA Men's Basketball All-Americans
