= Junction City School District =

Junction City School District may refer to:

- Junction City School District (Arkansas), based in Junction City, Arkansas
- Junction City School District (California), based in Junction City, California
- Junction City School District (Oregon), based in Junction City, Oregon
