= Malik Monk =

American basketball player (born 1998)

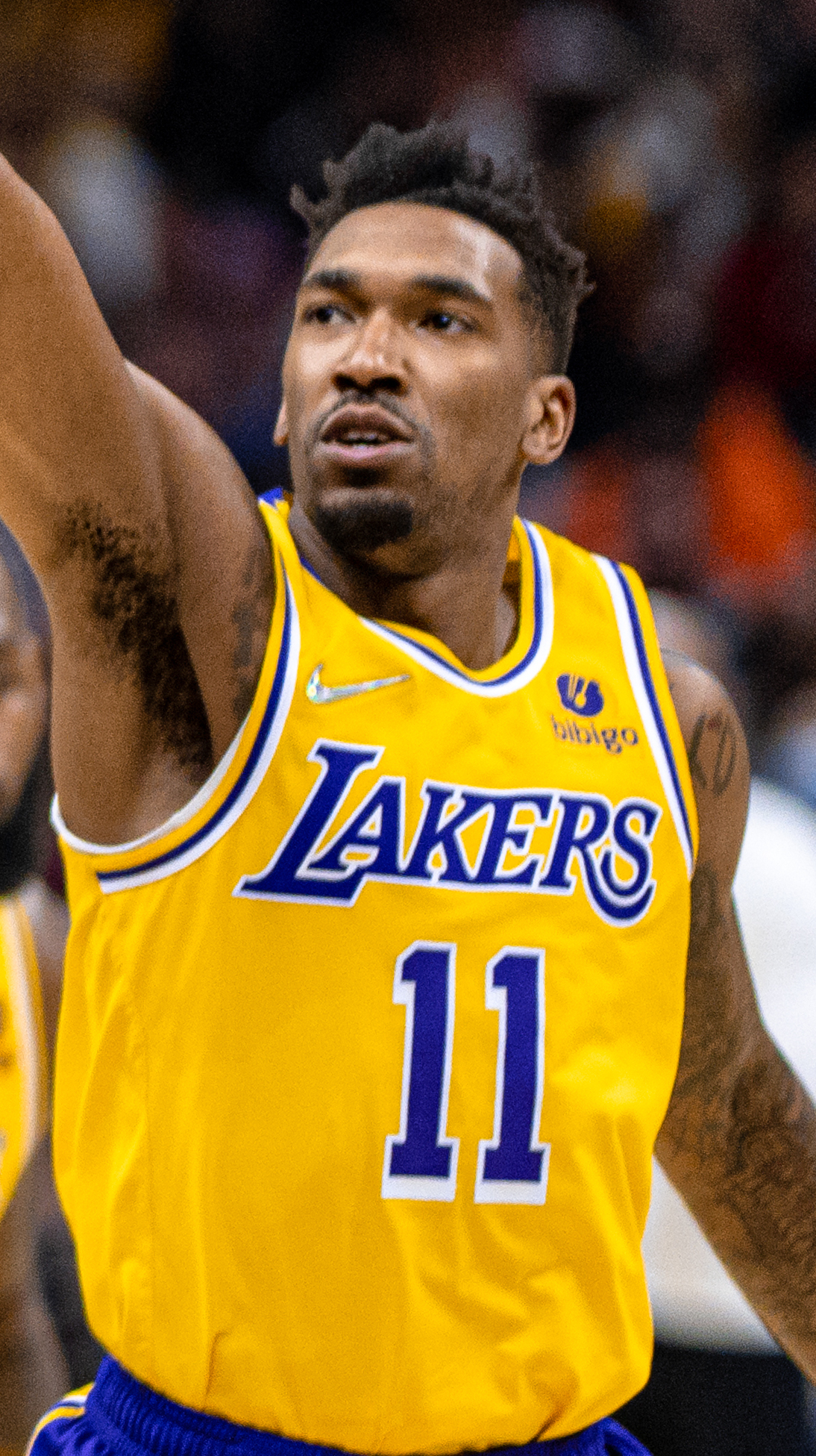
- Monk with the Los Angeles Lakers in 2022

No. 0 – Sacramento Kings
- Position: Shooting guard
- League: NBA

Personal information
- Born: February 4, 1998 (age 28) Jonesboro, Arkansas, U.S.
- Listed height: 6 ft 3 in (1.91 m)
- Listed weight: 200 lb (91 kg)

Career information
- High school: East Poinsett (Lepanto, Arkansas); Bentonville (Bentonville, Arkansas)
- College: Kentucky (2016–2017)
- NBA draft: 2017: 1st round, 11th overall pick
- Drafted by: Charlotte Hornets
- Playing career: 2017–present

Career history
- 2017–2021: Charlotte Hornets
- 2017: →Greensboro Swarm
- 2021–2022: Los Angeles Lakers
- 2022–present: Sacramento Kings

Career highlights
- Consensus second-team All-American (2017); Jerry West Award (2017); SEC Player of the Year – AP (2017); First-team All-SEC (2017); SEC Freshman of The Year (2017); SEC All-Freshman Team (2017); McDonald's All-American (2016); Mr. Basketball of Arkansas (2016)
- Stats at NBA.com
- Stats at Basketball Reference

Malik Ahmad Monk (born February 4, 1998) is an American professional basketball player for the Sacramento Kings of the National Basketball Association (NBA). He played one season of college basketball for the Kentucky Wildcats, earning consensus second-team All-American honors in 2017. Monk was selected in the first round of the 2017 NBA draft by the Charlotte Hornets with the 11th overall pick. He has also played for the Los Angeles Lakers.

== Early life ==
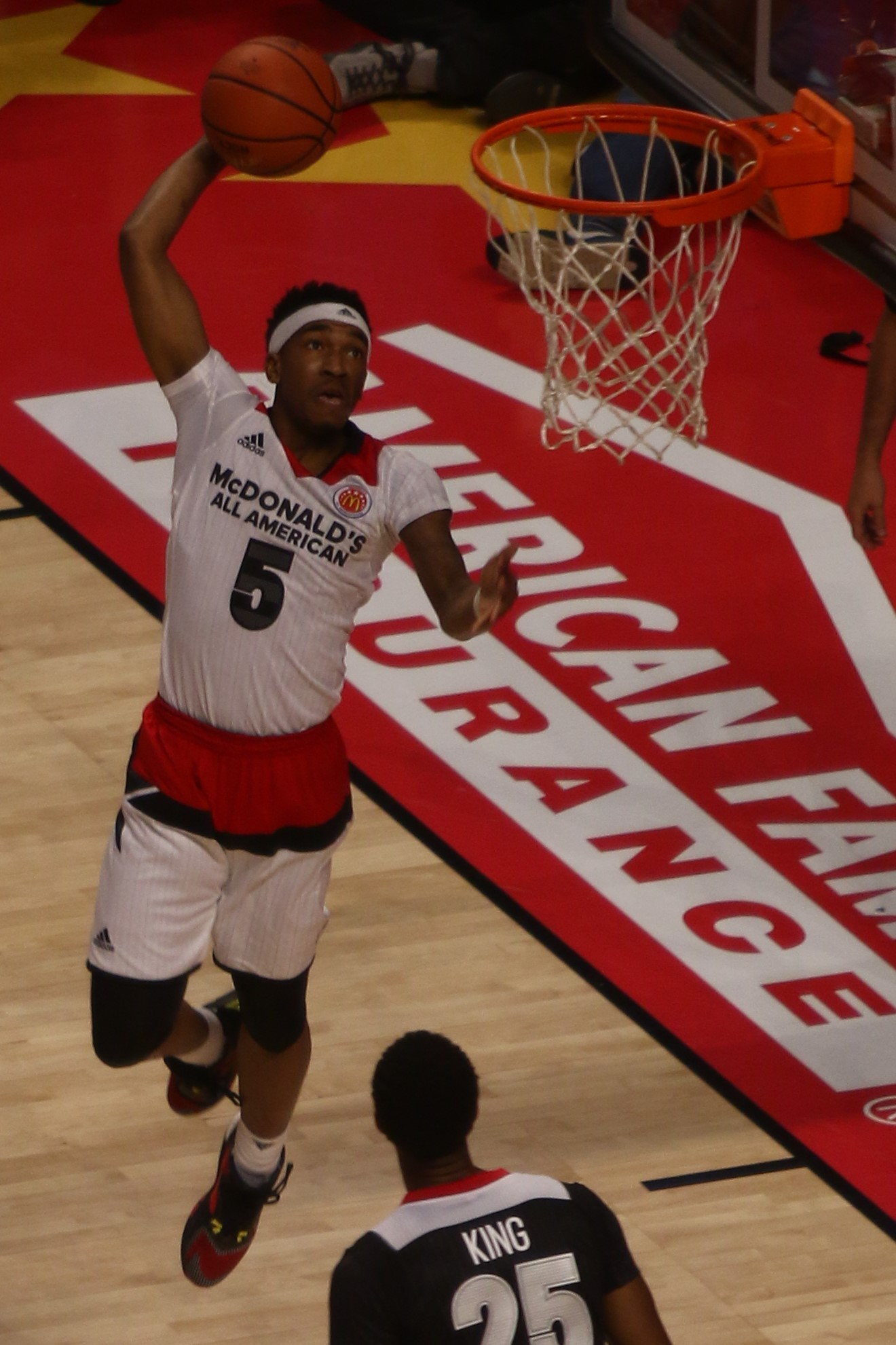
Monk dunking the basketball at the 2016 McDonald's All-American Boys Game

Monk attended East Poinsett County High School in Lepanto, Arkansas for his freshman year. As a freshman, he averaged 22.9 points, 4.6 rebounds and 2.7 assists per game while leading them to a 25–8 overall record and an appearance in the Class 2A state championship game. After his freshman season, Monk transferred to Bentonville High School in Bentonville, Arkansas. In his junior year, he averaged 26.9 points per game. In the spring and summer of 2015, Monk competed for the Amateur Athletic Union (AAU) team, Arkansas Wings Elite, in the Nike Elite Youth Basketball League (EYBL) where he averaged 19.7 points per game. He then competed on the 2015 Nike Global Challenge for the East team, where he averaged 22 points, 12 rebounds and four assists in addition to earning tournament MVP honors. On November 18, 2015, Monk committed to Kentucky, choosing them over Arkansas. As a senior, he averaged 28.6 points per game, 4.4 assists per game and 7.6 rebounds per game. In January 2016, Monk played in the 2016 McDonald's All-American Game and Jordan Brand Classic where he earned Co-MVP honors alongside former Kentucky teammate and NBA player De'Aaron Fox.

Monk was a consensus five-star prospect and considered as one of the best players in the 2016 class by the four main recruiting services: Rivals, ESPN, Scout and 247Sports. Monk was ranked as the No.9 overall recruit and No.1 shooting guard in the 2016 high school class.

College recruiting
Name	Hometown	School	Height	Weight	Commit date
Malik Monk; SG	Lepanto, AR	Bentonville	6 ft 3 in (1.91 m)	185 lb (84 kg)	Nov 18, 2015
Malik Monk; SG	Recruit ratings: Scout: Rivals: 247Sports: ESPN:				
Overall recruit ranking: Scout: 13 Rivals: 9 ESPN: 9
Note: In many cases, Scout, Rivals, 247Sports, On3, and ESPN may conflict in their listings of height and weight.; In these cases, the average was taken. ESPN grades are on a 100-point scale.; Sources: "Kentucky 2016 Basketball Commitments". Rivals.; "2016 Kentucky Basketball Commits". Scout.; "ESPN". ESPN.; "Scout.com Team Recruiting Rankings". Scout.; "2016 Team Ranking". Rivals.

== College career ==
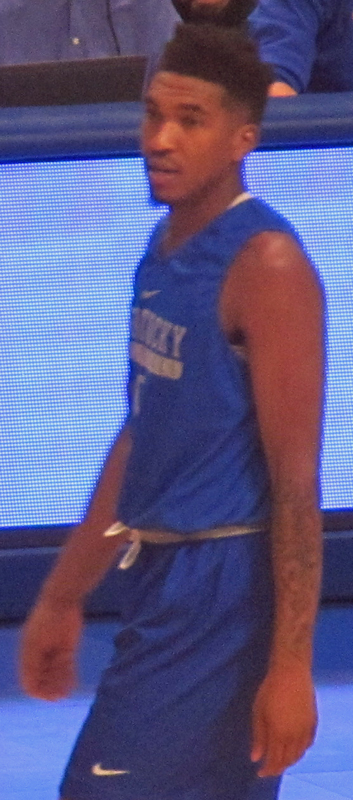
Monk in Kentucky's 2016 Blue-White scrimmage

On November 18, 2015, Monk tweeted that he would be attending the University of Kentucky.

On December 17, 2016, Monk set a University of Kentucky freshman scoring record with 47 points in a win over North Carolina. Twelve days later, he scored 34 points on 5-for-7 three-point shooting in a 99–76 win over Ole Miss. On January 21, 2017, Monk scored 27 points in a 85–69 win over South Carolina. On January 31, 2017, he scored 37 points against Georgia. On February 25, 2017, Monk tallied 33 points in a 76–66 victory over Florida. On February 28, 2017, Monk scored 27 points in a 73–67 win over Vanderbilt. At the end of his freshman season, Monk was named SEC Player and Freshman of the Year, while also being named to both First-team All-SEC and the SEC All-Freshman team.

At the conclusion of his freshman season, Monk announced that he would forgo his final three years of collegiate eligibility and enter the 2017 NBA draft where he was projected as a first-round selection. Less than 24 hours after teammate De'Aaron Fox announced his intentions to declare for the draft Monk also announced he was declaring for the draft. Stating, "After taking some time with my family and reflecting on this season, I have decided to enter my name into the 2017 NBA draft."

== Professional career ==
=== Charlotte Hornets (2017–2021) ===
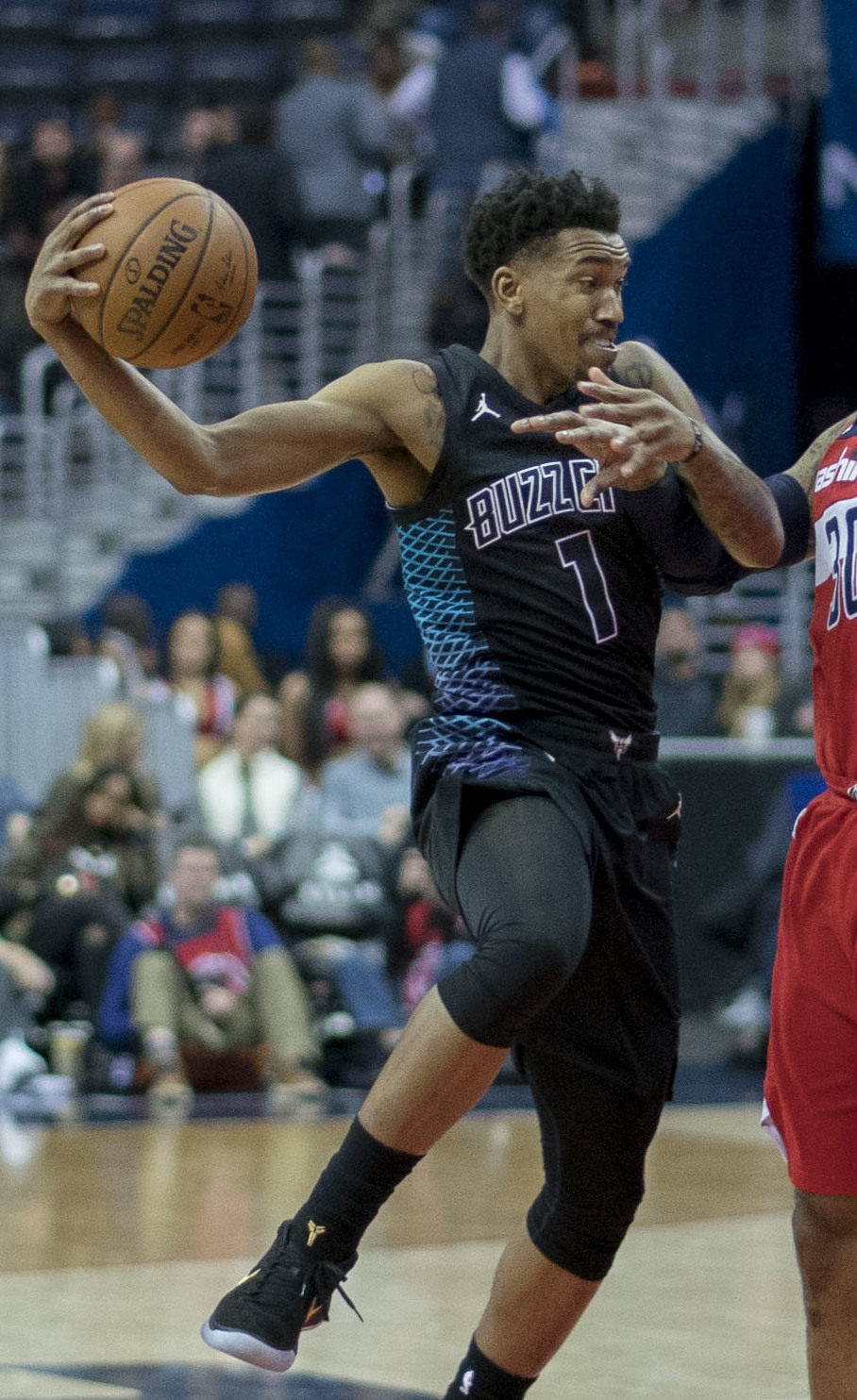
Monk with the Hornets in 2018

On June 22, 2017, Monk was selected with the eleventh overall pick in the 2017 NBA draft by the Charlotte Hornets. On July 2, 2017, Monk signed his rookie-scale contract with the Hornets worth $15,726,047. Monk missed the entire 2017 NBA Summer League due to an ankle injury. In his fourth game on October 25, 2017, Monk recorded 17 points, two steals and two assists in a 110–93 victory against the Denver Nuggets. On November 1, 2017, with Kentucky coach John Calipari on hand, Monk scored 25 points in a 126–121 victory against the Milwaukee Bucks.

During his rookie season, Monk was assigned to the Hornets' NBA G League affiliate, the Greensboro Swarm, for one game. He scored 25 points, collected eight rebounds and recorded four assists in a December 26, 2017 game. On February 26, 2020, Monk was suspended indefinitely for violating the NBA's substance use policy. Before the suspension, Monk was averaging 10.3 points and 2.9 rebounds per game. He was reinstated on June 8, after it was determined he was in compliance with the anti-drug program. On February 1, 2021, Monk scored a then-career-high 36 points in a 129–121 overtime win over the Heat.

=== Los Angeles Lakers (2021–2022) ===
On August 6, 2021, Monk signed with the Los Angeles Lakers on a trade-exception salary deal. On April 10, 2022, Monk put up a then-career-high 41 points in a 146–141 win over the Denver Nuggets.

=== Sacramento Kings (2022–present) ===
On July 6, 2022, Monk signed a two-year, $19 million contract with the Sacramento Kings reuniting with his former college teammate De'Aaron Fox. On February 24, 2023, Monk scored a career-high 45 points in a 176–175 double-overtime win over the Los Angeles Clippers, the second-highest-scoring game in NBA history. In game 1 of the Kings' first-round playoff series against the Golden State Warriors, Monk scored 32 points on perfect 14-of-14 shooting from the free throw line in a 126–123 win. He also tied Ed Macauley's record for the most free throws made without a miss in a playoff debut.

On July 6, 2024, Monk re-signed with the Kings. Monk signed a four-year contract worth $78 million. It was a max allowed contract by the Kings incentivized with a player option in the fourth year.

== Career statistics ==
Legend
GP	Games played	GS	Games started	MPG	Minutes per game
FG%	Field goal percentage	3P%	3-point field goal percentage	FT%	Free throw percentage
RPG	Rebounds per game	APG	Assists per game	SPG	Steals per game
BPG	Blocks per game	PPG	Points per game	**Bold**	Career high

=== NBA ===
==== Regular season ====
Year	Team	GP	GS	MPG	FG%	3P%	FT%	RPG	APG	SPG	BPG	PPG
2017–18	Charlotte	63	0	13.5	.360	.342	.842	1.0	1.4	.3	.1	6.7
2018–19	Charlotte	73	0	17.2	.387	.330	.882	1.9	1.6	.5	.3	8.9
2019–20	Charlotte	55	1	21.3	.434	.284	.820	2.9	2.1	.5	.3	10.3
2020–21	Charlotte	42	0	20.9	.434	**.401**	.819	2.4	2.1	.5	.1	11.7
2021–22	L.A. Lakers	76	37	28.1	**.473**	.391	.795	3.4	2.9	.8	.4	13.8
2022–23	Sacramento	**77**	0	22.3	.448	.359	**.889**	2.6	3.9	.6	.3	13.5
2023–24	Sacramento	72	0	26.0	.443	.350	.829	2.9	5.1	.6	.5	15.4
2024–25	Sacramento	65	**45**	**31.6**	.439	.325	.865	**3.8**	**5.6**	**.9**	**.6**	**17.2**
2025–26	Sacramento	62	3	22.0	.438	.395	.879	1.9	3.0	.6	.4	12.5
Career		585	86	22.7	.434	.355	.851	2.6	3.1	.6	.3	12.3

==== Playoffs ====
Year	Team	GP	GS	MPG	FG%	3P%	FT%	RPG	APG	SPG	BPG	PPG
2023	Sacramento	7	0	29.3	.409	.333	.898	5.4	3.6	.7	.4	19.0
Career		7	0	29.3	.409	.333	.898	5.4	3.6	.7	.4	19.0

=== College ===
Year	Team	GP	GS	MPG	FG%	3P%	FT%	RPG	APG	SPG	BPG	PPG
2016–17	Kentucky	38	37	32.1	.450	.397	.822	2.5	2.3	.9	.5	19.8

== Personal life ==
Monk was born in Jonesboro, Arkansas to Jackie Monk and Michael Scales and is the younger brother of former Arkansas All-SEC wide receiver and NFL player Marcus Monk. Monk's cousin, Rashad Madden played basketball for University of Arkansas and has played professionally overseas. His uncle, Chuck Monk, played running back for Arkansas State University.

== See also ==
- List of people banned or suspended by the NBA
