= Marcus Relphorde =

American basketball player

Personal information
- Born: December 1, 1988 (age 37) Chicago, Illinois, U.S.
- Listed height: 6 ft 7 in (2.01 m)
- Listed weight: 220 lb (100 kg)

Career information
- High school: American Christian Academy (Aston, Pennsylvania)
- College: Saint Louis (2007–2008); Indian Hills CC (2008–2009); Colorado (2009–2011)
- NBA draft: 2011: undrafted
- Playing career: 2011–2023
- Position: Small forward

Career history
- 2011: Canton Charge
- 2012: LF Basket
- 2012: Naglis Palanga
- 2013–2014: Salon Vilpas
- 2014–2015: Nantes Atlantique
- 2015: Rethymno Cretan Kings
- 2016: Falco Szombathely
- 2016–2017: Hapoel Migdal Ha'emek
- 2017: Gimnasia Indalo
- 2017–2019: Maccabi Rehovot
- 2019–2020: Ironi Kiryat Ata
- 2020–2021: Saint-Chamond Basket
- 2021–2023: Poitiers Basket 86

Marcus Relphorde (born December 1, 1988) is an American former professional basketball player who last played for Poitiers Basket 86 of the NM1. Standing at 6 ft 7 in (2.01 m), he plays at the small forward position.

== College career ==
Relphorde played college basketball mostly at the University of Colorado, with the Colorado Buffaloes, from 2009 to 2011.

== Professional career ==
Relphorde began his pro career with Canton Charge in 2011. In December he left the club. Then he signed with LF Basket for the rest of the season.

He moved to the Lithuanian club Naglis Palangos in the beginning of the 2012–2013 season. He next played with the Finish club Salon Vilpas., before joining the Greek club he joined the Israeli powerhouse Maccabi Tel Aviv in 2013 for tryouts. He returned to Salon Vilpas for the rest of the 2013–2014 season.

In June 2014, he signed with Hermine de Nantes Atlantique.

In 2015, he signed with Rethymno Cretan Kings and played there until he was replaced by Rashad Madden in December of the same year.

On May 11, 2017, Relphorde joined Gimnasia Indalo of the Argentine League for the rest of the 2016–17 season.

On June 22, 2017, Relphorde signed with the Israeli team Maccabi Rehovot of the Israeli National League. Relphorde led Rehovot to the 2018 National League Playoffs as the third seed, but they eventually were eliminated by Maccabi Kiryat Gat in the Semifinals.

On July 26, 2018, Relphorde signed a one-year contract extension with Rehovot. In 27 games played during the 2018–19 season, he averaged 20.1 points, 6.5 rebounds, 2.9 assists and 1.1 steals per game.

On August 14, 2019, Relphorde signed with Ironi Kiryat Ata for the 2019–20 season.

== The Basketball Tournament (TBT) ==
In the summers of 2016 and 2017, Relphorde played in The Basketball Tournament on ESPN for Team Colorado (Colorado Alumni). He competed for the $2 million prize, and for Team Colorado, he averaged 8.0 points per game. As a No. 1 seed in the West Region, Relphorde helped take Team Colorado to the Super 16 Round, but was defeated by Armored Athlete 84–75.
