= JJ Andrews =

American basketball player (born 2008)

No. 7 – Arkansas Razorbacks
- Position: Small forward
- Conference: Southeastern Conference

Personal information
- Born: March 7, 2008 (age 18)
- Listed height: 6 ft 6 in (1.98 m)
- Listed weight: 215 lb (98 kg)

Career information
- High school: Little Rock Christian Academy (Little Rock, Arkansas)
- College: Arkansas (2026–present)

Career highlights
- McDonald's All-American (2026); Mr. Basketball of Arkansas (2025)

JaShawn Andrews (born March 7, 2008) is an American college basketball player for the Arkansas Razorbacks of the Southeastern Conference (SEC). He was a five-star prospect and one of the top recruits in the class of 2026.

== Early life ==
Andrews is from Little Rock, Arkansas, and is the son of former NFL player Shawn Andrews. He attended Little Rock Christian Academy where he became a top basketball player. He led Little Rock to state championships both his freshman and sophomore seasons, earning all-conference and all-state honors each year. As a junior, he averaged 28.5 points, 10.1 rebounds and 3.3 assists while helping Little Rock to the state quarterfinals, being named all-conference, all-state the Gatorade Arkansas Player of the Year and a MaxPreps All-American. Andrews is a two-time champion of the Peach Jam tournament in the Nike Elite Youth Basketball League (EYBL), earning EYBL MVP honors after the 2025 season where he led team BBE to a 75–55 win in the championship.

A five-star prospect, Andrews is ranked one of the top-15 recruits nationally in the class of 2026. He committed to play college basketball for the Arkansas Razorbacks.
