= East Poinsett County School District =

School district in Arkansas, United States

Location
- 502 Mcclellan Street; Lepanto, Arkansas 72354 United States

District information
- Grades: PK–12
- Established: 1986
- Accreditation: Arkansas Department of Education
- Schools: 3
- NCES District ID: 0500021

Students and staff
- Students: 705
- Teachers: 67.78 (on FTE basis)
- Staff: 133.78(on FTE basis)
- Student–teacher ratio: 11.51
- District mascot: Warrior
- Colors: Black; Red

Other information
- Website: epc.k12.ar.us

East Poinsett County School District (EPCSD) is a public school district based in Lepanto, Arkansas, United States. The school district encompasses 148.47 square miles (384.5 km^{2}) of land, including portions of Poinsett County and Mississippi County.

Poinsett County incorporated communities in the district include Lepanto and Tyronza, Unincorporated counties in the county and in the district include Rivervale.

The district proves comprehensive education for pre-kindergarten through grade 12 and is accredited by the Arkansas Department of Education (ADE).

== History ==
The district was formed on July 1, 1986, when the Lepanto and Tyronza school systems consolidated. The high school sports team, the Lepanto Panthers, became the EPC Warriors.

== Schools ==
Secondary schools

- East Poinsett County High School, located in Lepanto and serving more than 300 students in grades 7 through 12.

Elementary schools

- Lepanto Elementary School, located in Lepanto and serving more than 200 students in pre-kindergarten through grade 2.
- Tyronza Elementary School, located in Tyronza and serving more than 225 students in pre-kindergarten and in grades 4–6.
