= KeVaughn Allen =

American basketball player

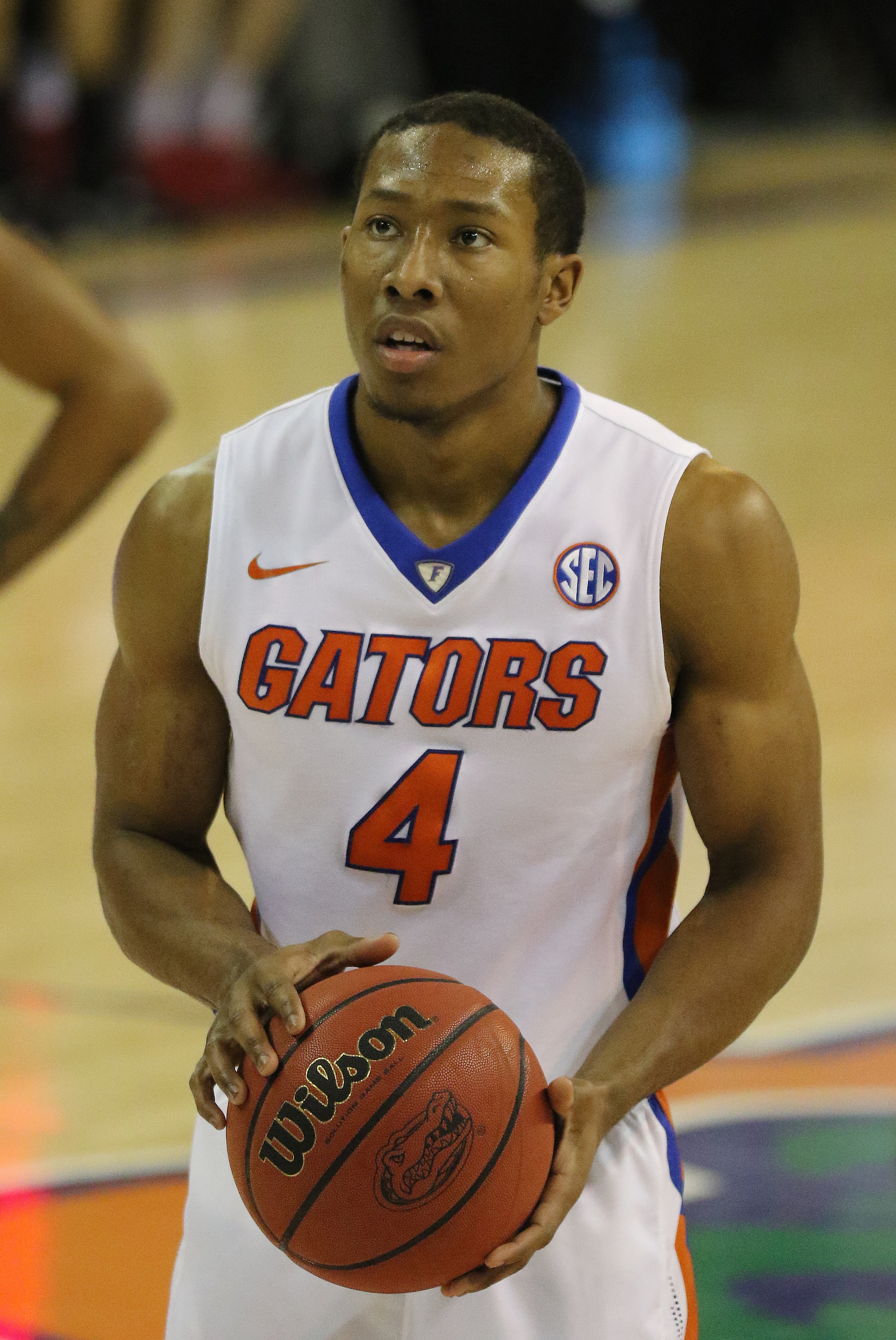
- Allen with Florida in 2016

No. 23 – BC Kalev
- Position: Point guard / shooting guard
- League: Latvian-Estonian Basketball League

Personal information
- Born: October 10, 1995 (age 31)
- Listed height: 6 ft 2 in (1.88 m)
- Listed weight: 193 lb (88 kg)

Career information
- High school: North Little Rock (North Little Rock, Arkansas)
- College: Florida (2015–2019)
- NBA draft: 2019: undrafted
- Playing career: 2019–present

Career history
- 2019–2020: Lovćen
- 2020–2021: Ura Basket
- 2021–2023: Leuven Bears
- 2023–2024: KK Cedevita Junior
- 2024: Constanta
- 2024–2025: Lavrio
- 2025–2026: Medi Bayreuth
- 2026–present: BC Kalev

Career highlights
- First-team All-SEC – Coaches (2017); Second-team All-SEC – AP (2017); SEC All-Freshman Team (2016); First-team Parade All-American (2015); 2× Mr. Basketball of Arkansas (2014, 2015)

KeVaughn Allen (born October 10, 1995) is an American professional basketball player for BC Kalev of the Latvian-Estonian Basketball League. He played college basketball at Florida.

== High school career ==
Allen attended North Little Rock High School. As a junior, Allen averaged 21 points, 6.8 rebounds and 3.8 assists per game. He was named Gatorade Boys Basketball Player of the Year in Arkansas and led North Little Rock to a Class 7A state title. As a senior, he averaged 25.2 points, 6.2 rebounds, 4.7 assists and 3.1 steals per game. Allen was named Arkansas’ Gatorade Boys Basketball Player of the Year for the second straight year. Rated No. 67 player in the class of 2015 by Rivals.com, he committed to Florida in April 2014 but requested a release from his letter of intent after coach Billy Donovan left to take the job at the Oklahoma City Thunder. After a meeting with new Florida coach Mike White, Allen decided to remain with Florida.

== College career ==
Allen scored a season-high 32 points in a 73–71 loss to Florida State on December 29, 2015. Allen averaged 11.6 points, 2.7 rebounds and 1.6 assists per game as a freshman. He was named to the SEC All-Freshman Team. As a sophomore, Allen averaged 14.0 points, 2.4 rebounds and 1.5 assists per game for Florida's 27–9 team that reached the Elite Eight of the NCAA Tournament. He recorded a career-high 35 points against Wisconsin in a Sweet 16 matchup and was named to the all-regional team. He was named to the First Team All-SEC by the coaches. Allen averaged 11 points, 2.4 rebounds and 2.4 assists as a junior. Coming into his senior season, Allen was named to the Jerry West Award watchlist. As a senior, Allen averaged 11.8 points and 2.8 rebounds per game.

== Professional career ==
Prior to the 2019 NBA draft, Allen worked out with the Orlando Magic. Allen signed with Lovćen 1947 of the Montenegrin League on December 4, 2019.

On June 2, 2021, he has signed with Leuven Bears of the Pro Basketball League.

On September 16, 2024, Allen signed with CSM Constanta for the 2024-2025 season. On December 10 of the same year, he moved to Greek club Lavrio.

On June 22, 2026, Allen signed with BC Kalev for the 2026-2027 season.
