= East Poinsett County High School =

Location
- 502 McClellan Street; Lepanto, Arkansas 72354; United States
- Coordinates: 35°36′30″N 90°20′25″W

Information
- School type: Public (government funded)
- Motto: Chivalry, Honor, Success
- Status: Open
- School district: East Poinsett County School District
- NCES District ID: 0500048
- Authority: Arkansas Department of Education (ADE)
- CEEB code: 040030
- NCES School ID: 050004801348
- Staff: 31.10 (FTE)
- Grades: 7–12
- Enrollment: 274 (2023–2024)
- Student to teacher ratio: 8.81
- Education system: ADE Smart Core curriculum
- Colors: Red, black, and white
- Athletics conference: 2A Region 3 (Football); 2A Region 2 (Basketball)
- Mascot: Warrior
- Team name: East Poinsett County Warriors
- Rival: Marked Tree
- Accreditation: ADE; AdvancED (1980–)
- Yearbook: The Warrior
- Affiliation: Arkansas Activities Association
- Website: www.epc.k12.ar.us/o/high-school

East Poinsett County High School (EPC) is a nationally recognized and accredited comprehensive public high school serving students in grades six through twelve in Lepanto, Arkansas, United States located in eastern Poinsett County.

== Academics ==
The school is accredited by the Arkansas Department of Education (ADE). The assumed course of study follows the Smart Core curriculum developed the Arkansas Department of Education (ADE). Students engage in regular (core) and career focus courses and exams and may select Advanced Placement (AP) coursework and exams that may lead to college credit.

== Athletics ==
The East Poinsett High School mascot and athletic emblem is the Warrior (stylized as a Native American) with school colors of red, black and white.

The East Poinsett Warriors participate in various interscholastic activities in the 2A Classification within the 2A Region 3 Conference as administered by the Arkansas Activities Association. The Warriors school athletic activities include football, golf (boys/girls), basketball (boys/girls), baseball, softball, tennis (boys/girls) and cheer.

- Basketball: The boys basketball teams have won five state basketball championships (1995, 2004, 2011, 2012, 2024).
- Tennis: The Warriors have maintained a successful tennis program with state championships for girls tennis in 1993 and 1995, followed by the boys team taking the 2006 state championship.

== Notable alumni ==
- Marcus Monk (2004), professional football and basketball player; class valedictorian and Mr. Basketball of Arkansas 2004
- Rashad Madden (2011), basketball player in the Israeli National League
- Malik Monk (2016, transferred), professional basketball player for the Sacramento Kings; played college basketball for the Kentucky Wildcats
