= Junction City School District (Arkansas) =

School district in Arkansas, United States

Address
- 100 West Holly Street Junction City, Arkansas, 71749; United States

District information
- Type: Public
- Grades: K–12
- NCES District ID: 0508340

Students and staff
- Students: 654
- Teachers: 67.3
- Staff: 53.29
- Student–teacher ratio: 9.72

Other information
- Website: www.junctioncity.k12.ar.us

Junction City School District 75 is a school district based in Junction City, Arkansas, United States. JCSD supports more than 525 students in prekindergarten through grade 12 and employs more than 105 educators and staff for its two schools and district offices. The district encompasses 203.63 square miles (527.4 km^{2}) in Union County, Arkansas and supports Junction City and portions of El Dorado.

== Schools ==
- Junction City High School, serving students in grades 7 through 12.
- Junction City Elementary School, serving students in prekindergarten through grade 6.
