= Junction City High School (Arkansas) =

Location
- 530 North Elm Road; Junction City, Arkansas 71749; United States
- Coordinates: 33°1′8″N 92°43′40″W

Information
- Status: Open
- School district: Junction City School District
- NCES District ID: 0508340
- Oversight: Arkansas Department of Education (ADE)
- CEEB code: 041285
- NCES School ID: 050834000558
- Principal: Robby Lowe
- Faculty: 57.41 (on FTE basis)
- Grades: 7-12
- Enrollment: 310 (2023-2024)
- Student to teacher ratio: 5.40
- Education system: ADE Smart Core curriculum
- Classes offered: Regular, Advanced Placement
- Campus type: Rural
- Colors: Purple and gold
- Athletics conference: 2A 8 (Football) (2012-14); 2A 7 West (Basketball) (2012-14)
- Sports: Baseball
- Mascot: Dragon
- Team name: Junction City Dragons
- Accreditation: ADE
- Feeder schools: Junction City Elementary School
- Affiliation: Arkansas Activities Association (AAA)
- Website: junctioncity.k12.ar.us

Junction City High School is a comprehensive public junior/senior high school serving grades seven through twelve in the rural, distant community of Junction City, Arkansas, United States. Located in southern Union County, Arkansas, Junction City High School is one of seven public high schools in the county and is the sole high school managed by the Junction City School District. The school has a concurrent credit arrangement for students at the nearby South Arkansas Community College. Since 1974, Junction City High School has won seven state baseball championships.

== Curriculum ==
The assumed course of study at Junction City High School is the Smart Core curriculum developed by the Arkansas Department of Education (ADE). Students engage in regular and Advanced Placement (AP) coursework and exams to obtain at least 22 units before graduation. Exceptional students have been recognized as National Merit Finalists and participated in Arkansas Governor's School. The school maintains a concurrent credit partnership with South Arkansas Community College, whereas students in 11th and 12th grade can attend SACC and receive high school and college credit simultaneously.

== Extracurricular activities ==
The Junction City High School mascot is the dragon with purple and yellow serving as the school colors.

=== Athletics ===
For the 2012-2014 seasons, the Junction City Dragons participate 2A 8 (Football) Conference and the 2A 7 (Basketball) Conference. Competition is primarily sanctioned by the Arkansas Activities Association with the Dragons competing in basketball (boys/girls), cheer, football, golf (boys/girls), track, weightlifting and softball.

=== Football ===
Under Coach David Carpenter, Dragon football is one of the most dominant teams in state. It has recorded state championships in 2003, 2008, 2009, 2012, 2013, 2014 and 2018. The Dragons were the state championship runner-ups in 2017 when the teams competed in 3A competition. In 2003, the Dragon football team scored a state-record 753 points as it won 15 games, a modern state-record tying performance. The team also has claimed a state runner-up in 2006. The 2009 team had 9 shutouts, the most in school history.

=== Baseball ===
The baseball team is one of the state's most successful having won nine state championships between 1972 and 2019, including consecutive titles in 1981 and 1982. The Dragons Baseball team most recently won the state championship in 2014 and 2019, while being the runner-up in 2016. The Dragons baseball squad has made 34 state tournaments, winning 61 tournament contests, a state-record 21 semifinals, and 11 title game appearances. The 1981 team holds the state record for most regular season wins with 37, and the 1977 squad went undefeated at 24-0. Several members of the baseball team hold state records, most notably Kelly Owens (1981–82) who has four state-records listed in the national high school record book, which is maintained by the National Federation of State High School Associations.

=== Basketball ===
In 2006-07, James Anderson led the Junction City Dragons to the state basketball championship and was awarded the Gatorade Boys Basketball Player of the Year award and several national honors.

=== Cheer ===
The competitive cheer team has won two state championships (2008, 2012).

== Notable people ==
The following are notable people associated with Junction City High School.

- James Anderson (Class of 2007) — professional basketball player, high school All-American and former San Antonio Spurs draft pick
- Ronald Simmons (politics) Class of 1978 - State Representative, Texas House of Representatives 2012 - 2019
