= Junction City, Arkansas =

- City
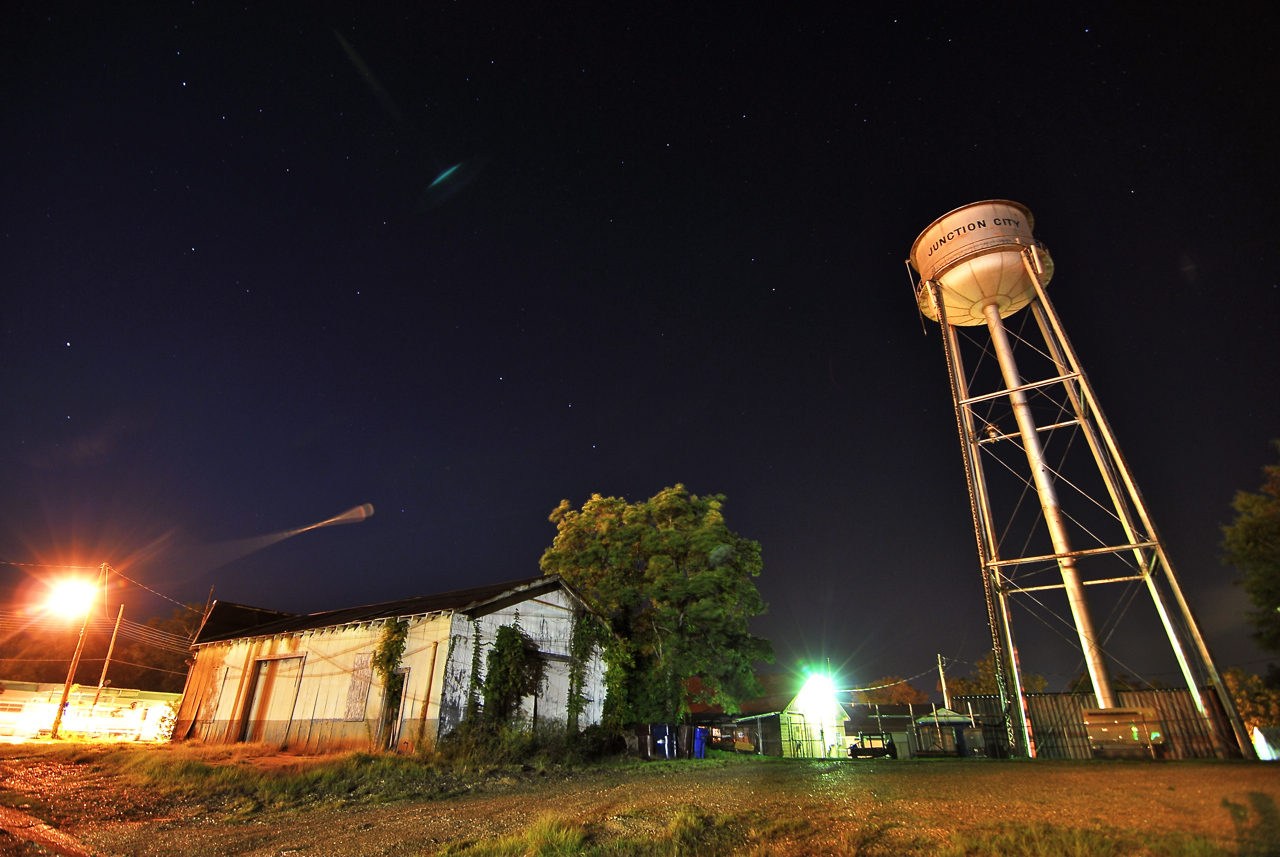

- Location of Junction City in Union County, Arkansas.
- Coordinates: 33°01′20″N 92°43′25″W
- Country: United States
- State: Arkansas
- County: Union

Area
  - Total: 1.14 sq mi (2.94 km^{2})
  - Land: 1.14 sq mi (2.94 km^{2})
  - Water: 0 sq mi (0.00 km^{2})
- Elevation: 190 ft (58 m)

Population (2020)
  - Total: 503
  - Estimate (2025): 476 ▼
  - Density: 442.8/sq mi (170.96/km^{2})
- Time zone: UTC-6 (Central (CST))
  - Summer (DST): UTC-5 (CDT)
- ZIP code: 71749
- Area code: 870
- FIPS code: 05-36130
- GNIS feature ID: 2404814

Junction City is a city in Union County, Arkansas, United States, and is the twin city of neighboring Junction City, Louisiana. As of the 2020 census, Junction City had a population of 503.

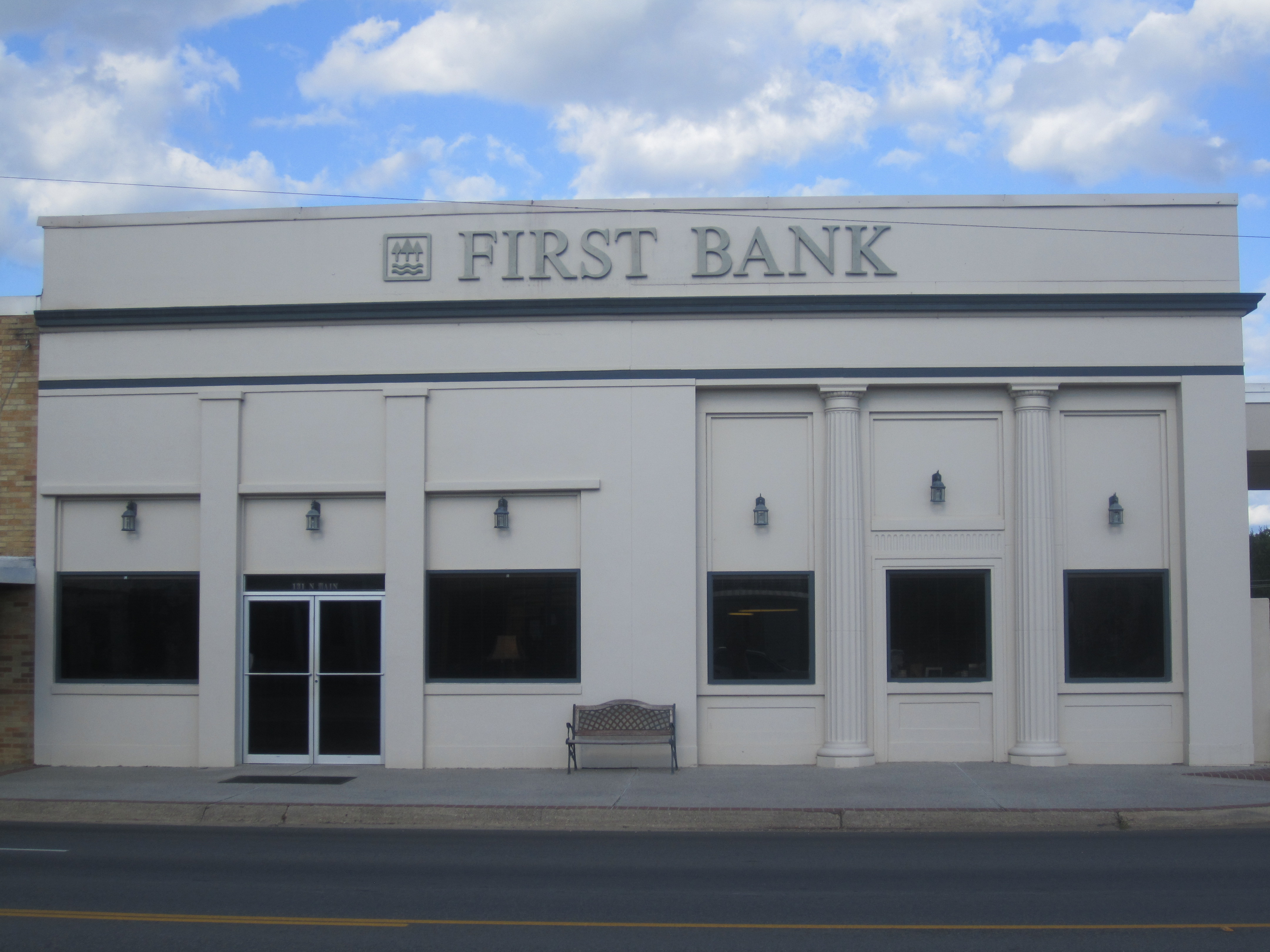
First Bank of South Arkansas at 131 North Main Street

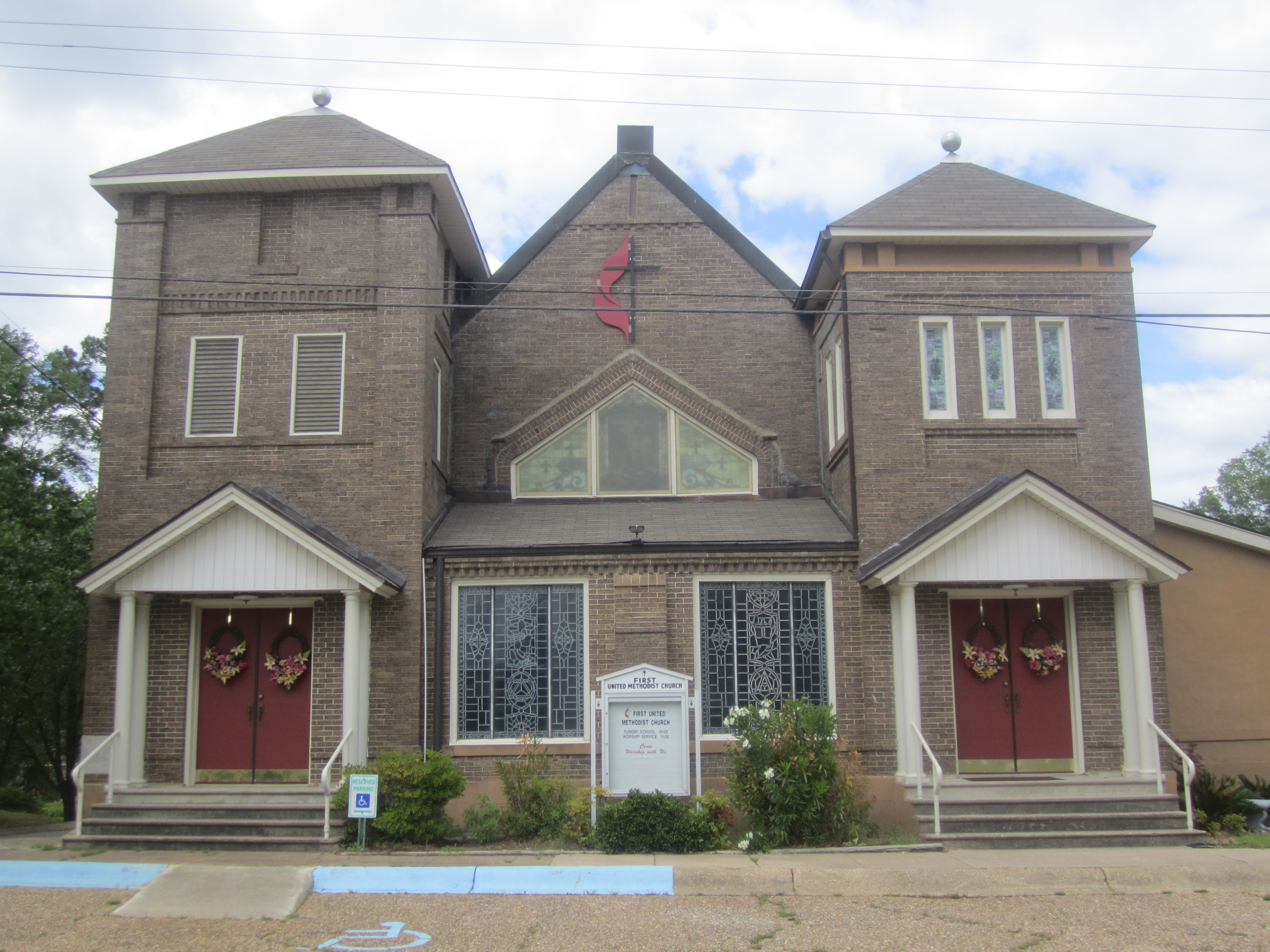
First United Methodist Church in Junction City

== Geography ==
Junction City is the southernmost settlement in the state of Arkansas.

According to the United States Census Bureau, the city has a total area of 1.1 square miles (2.8 km^{2}), all land.

== Demographics ==
Historical population
Census	Pop.	Note	%±
1900	1,251		—
1910	1,065		−14.9%
1920	653		−38.7%
1930	814		24.7%
1940	797		−2.1%
1950	1,013		27.1%
1960	749		−26.1%
1970	763		1.9%
1980	813		6.6%
1990	674		−17.1%
2000	721		7.0%
2010	581		−19.4%
2020	503		−13.4%
2025 (est.)	476	▼	−5.4%
U.S. Decennial Census

=== 2020 census ===
Junction City racial composition
Race	Number	Percentage
White (non-Hispanic)	258	53.3%
Black or African American (non-Hispanic)	201	39.96%
Native American	4	0.8%
Asian	2	0.4%
Other/Mixed	29	5.77%
Hispanic or Latino	9	1.79%

As of the 2020 United States census, there were 503 people, 271 households, and 202 families residing in the city.

=== 2000 census ===
At the 2000 census there were 721 people in 251 households, including 186 families, in the city. The population density was 635.0 inhabitants per square mile (245.2/km^{2}). There were 288 housing units at an average density of 253.7 per square mile (98.0/km^{2}). The racial makeup of the city was 55.20% White, 43.00% Black or African American, 0.55% Native American, 0.14% Asian, and 1.11% from two or more races. 0.69% of the population were Hispanic or Latino of any race. Of the 251 households 34.3% had children under the age of 18 living with them, 53.4% were married couples living together, 15.5% had a female householder with no husband present, and 25.5% were non-families. 23.1% of households were one person and 13.5% were one person aged 65 or older. The average household size was 2.71 and the average family size was 3.17.

The age distribution was 29.1% under the age of 18, 9.0% from 18 to 24, 22.3% from 25 to 44, 21.4% from 45 to 64, and 18.2% 65 or older. The median age was 36 years. For every 100 females, there were 102.5 males. For every 100 females age 18 and over, there were 92.1 males.

The median household income was $27,981 and the median family income was $29,107. Males had a median income of $30,000 versus $15,313 for females. The per capita income for the city was $11,803. About 24.1% of families and 31.7% of the population were below the poverty line, including 40.5% of those under age 18 and 26.4% of those age 65 or over.

== Education ==
Public education for early childhood, elementary and secondary students is primarily provided by the Junction City School District, which includes:

- Junction City Elementary School, serving prekindergarten through grade 6.
- Junction City High School, serving grades 7 through 12.
