= Marcus Monk =

American football and basketball player (born 1986)

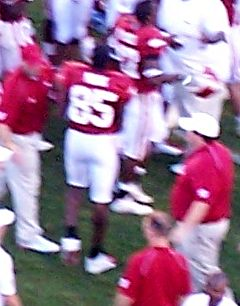
- Monk with the Arkansas Razorbacks in 2006

No. 19
- Position: Wide receiver

Personal information
- Born: April 26, 1986 (age 40); Lepanto, Arkansas, U.S.
- Listed height: 6 ft 4 in (1.93 m)
- Listed weight: 212 lb (96 kg)

Career information
- High school: East Poinsett (Lepanto, Arkansas)
- College: Arkansas (2004–2007)
- NFL draft: 2008: 7th round, 248th overall pick

Career history
- Chicago Bears (2008)*; New York Giants (2008)*; Carolina Panthers (2009)*
- * Offseason or practice squad member only
- Stats at Pro Football Reference

Marcus Monk (born April 26, 1986) is an American former professional football wide receiver and a former professional basketball player. He was selected by the Chicago Bears in the seventh round of the 2008 NFL draft. He played college football at Arkansas. Monk was also a member of the New York Giants and Carolina Panthers. Between 2010 and 2012, he played pro basketball in Germany. He is the older brother of basketball player Malik Monk.

== Early life ==
Monk attended, East Poinsett County High School and was a 4.0 student and a letterman in football and basketball. Also, he was the Valedictorian of his graduating class. He was an All-State honoree in both sports, 2004 Mr. Basketball of Arkansas as a senior, and was named the National Football Foundation's Scholar Athlete of the Year.

== Football career ==
=== College ===
Monk led all SEC freshmen in receiving in 2004 and set a school record for receptions by a freshman with 37 catches, breaking Richard Smith's school record of 33. He garnered Freshman All-SEC honors for catching 37 balls for 569 yards and six touchdowns.

Monk continued to improve in his sophomore season by catching 35 passes for a team-high 476 yards and seven touchdowns.

In his junior season of 2006, Monk had his best statistical season with 50 catches for a career-high 962 yards. Monk broke a school record with 11 touchdown passes caught and averaged 19.2 yards per catch. He helped Arkansas win the SEC West Division championship that year.

Monk was sidelined for most of his senior season due to an injury in the offseason that required two surgeries. Of the seven games he did play in, Monk only caught 16 passes for 144 yards and three touchdowns, tying him for seventh in the SEC for career touchdowns.

Monk still holds the Arkansas school record for career touchdown receptions, with 27.

==== Statistics ====
		Receiving				
Year	G	Rec	Yards	YPC	TD	Lg
2004	11	37	569	15.4	6	38
2005	11	35	476	13.6	7	55
2006	14	50	962	19.2	11	56
2007	7	16	144	9	3	23
Totals	43	138	2151	15.6	27	56

=== Professional ===
==== Chicago Bears ====
Monk was selected in the seventh round (248th overall) of the 2008 NFL draft by the Chicago Bears. Monk signed a four-year rookie deal with the Bears on May 31, 2008. He was waived on August 24.

==== New York Giants ====
On August 26, 2008, Monk was claimed off waivers by the New York Giants after the team waived/injured wide receiver Craphonso Thorpe. However, he was waived by the team four days later during final cuts. On August 31, he was re-signed to the team's practice squad. He was released from the practice squad on September 8 after wide receiver Taye Biddle was signed.

==== Carolina Panthers ====
Monk was signed by the Carolina Panthers on April 28, 2009, after impressing scouts at Arkansas's pro day.

== Basketball career ==
=== College ===
As a college freshman, Monk also played 10 games with the Razorbacks basketball team after completing the football season.

On November 18, 2008, KARK 4 News in Little Rock, Arkansas reported that Monk was possibly coming back for his last semester to play college basketball for the Arkansas Razorbacks. Monk was allowed to play as he had basketball eligibility remaining and was never a professional athlete in that sport.

Monk's breakout game would come on December 30, 2008, when Arkansas hosted the Oklahoma Sooners, ranked fourth in that week's Associated Press Poll. Monk scored 12 points and added six rebounds and one steal while holding his ground defensively against the Sooners' star player, Blake Griffin, in only his third game with the Razorbacks of the 2008-2009 season.

Monk was officially removed from the roster on February 13, 2009, by the University of Arkansas after several weeks of not dressing out for the team, for a suspected undisclosed NCAA rules infraction.

=== Professional ===
Monk signed with Hertener Löwen of the German ProB league in 2010. Appearing in 25 games for the team during the 2010–11 season, he averaged 22.2 points, 9.3 rebounds, 3.1 steals, 2.2 assists and 1.2 blocks a contest, while being named to the Eurobasket.com All-Pro B First-team and being recognized as the Eurobasket.com All-ProB Defensive Player of the Year.

In 2011–12, Monk was instrumental in helping the Gotha Rockets win the ProB title and received Eurobasket.com All-ProB Player of the Year honors, after tallying 15.3 points as well as 7.9 boards a game.

== Life after sports ==
After playing professional basketball in Germany for two years, Monk began the MBA program at the University of Arkansas. He graduated in 2014.
