= Lepanto, Arkansas =

- City
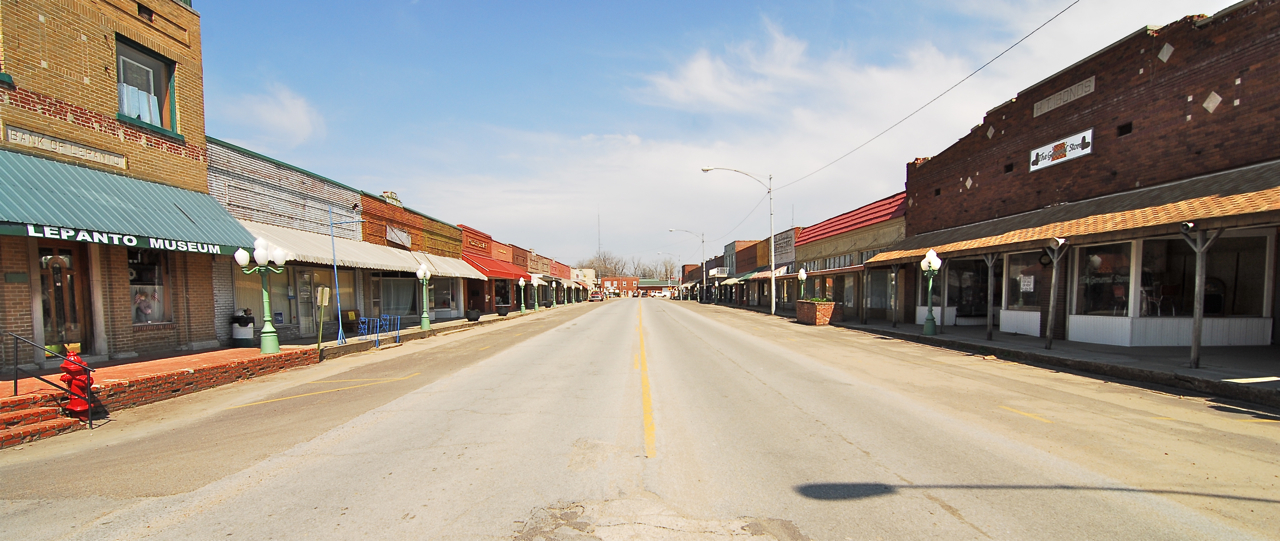
- Main Street Lepanto

- Location of Lepanto in Poinsett County, Arkansas.
- Coordinates: 35°36′58″N 90°19′35″W
- Country: United States
- State: Arkansas
- County: Poinsett

Area
  - Total: 1.56 sq mi (4.05 km^{2})
  - Land: 1.56 sq mi (4.05 km^{2})
  - Water: 0 sq mi (0.00 km^{2})
- Elevation: 223 ft (68 m)

Population (2020)
  - Total: 1,732
  - Estimate (2025): 1,643 ▼
  - Density: 1,107.5/sq mi (427.62/km^{2})
- Time zone: UTC-6 (Central (CST))
  - Summer (DST): UTC-5 (CDT)
- ZIP code: 72354
- Area code: 870
- FIPS code: 05-39370
- GNIS feature ID: 2404913

Lepanto is a city in Poinsett County, Arkansas, United States. As of the 2020 census, Lepanto had a population of 1,732. It is included in the Jonesboro, Arkansas Metropolitan Statistical Area. The city is named for the Greek seaport of Lepanto, the site of a great sea battle in 1571.

== Geography ==
According to the United States Census Bureau, the city has a total area of 1.5 square miles (3.9 km^{2}), all land.

== Demographics ==
Historical population
Census	Pop.	Note	%±
1910	154		—
1920	986		540.3%
1930	1,195		21.2%
1940	1,198		0.3%
1950	1,683		40.5%
1960	1,157		−31.3%
1970	1,846		59.6%
1980	1,964		6.4%
1990	2,033		3.5%
2000	2,133		4.9%
2010	1,893		−11.3%
2020	1,732		−8.5%
2025 (est.)	1,643	▼	−5.1%
U.S. Decennial Census

=== 2020 census ===
As of the 2020 census, Lepanto had a population of 1,732. The median age was 38.8 years. 23.9% of residents were under the age of 18 and 16.1% of residents were 65 years of age or older. For every 100 females there were 93.7 males, and for every 100 females age 18 and over there were 92.4 males age 18 and over.

As of the 2020 census, there were 717 households and 533 families residing in the city. Of all households, 33.1% had children under the age of 18 living in them. Of all households, 39.9% were married-couple households, 20.9% were households with a male householder and no spouse or partner present, and 33.1% were households with a female householder and no spouse or partner present. About 31.0% of all households were made up of individuals and 15.5% had someone living alone who was 65 years of age or older.

There were 809 housing units, of which 11.4% were vacant. The homeowner vacancy rate was 1.7% and the rental vacancy rate was 12.8%.

0.0% of residents lived in urban areas, while 100.0% lived in rural areas.

Lepanto racial composition
Race	Number	Percentage
White (non-Hispanic)	1,323	76.39%
Black or African American (non-Hispanic)	233	13.45%
Native American	4	0.23%
Other/Mixed	82	4.73%
Hispanic or Latino	90	5.2%

=== 2010 census ===
As of the 2010 census Lepanto had a population of 1,893. The ethnic and racial makeup of the population was 79.3% non-Hispanic white, 14.8% African-American, 0.1% Native American, 0.1 Asian, 1.7% reporting two or more races, including 1.2% reporting being white and African-American, and 4.3% Hispanic.

=== 2000 census ===
As of the census of 2000, there were 2,133 people, 851 households, and 595 families residing in the city. The population density was 1,459.4 inhabitants per square mile (563.5/km^{2}). There were 891 housing units at an average density of 609.6 per square mile (235.4/km^{2}). The racial makeup of the city was 82.37% White, 15.56% Black or African American, 0.05% Native American, 0.05% Asian, 0.98% from other races, and 0.98% from two or more races. 2.11% of the population were Hispanic or Latino of any race.

There were 851 households, out of which 35.6% had children under the age of 18 living with them, 46.1% were married couples living together, 18.8% had a female householder with no husband present, and 30.0% were non-families. 28.0% of all households were made up of individuals, and 14.8% had someone living alone who was 65 years of age or older. The average household size was 2.51 and the average family size was 3.04.

In the city, the population was spread out, with 29.1% under the age of 18, 9.4% from 18 to 24, 24.8% from 25 to 44, 22.6% from 45 to 64, and 14.0% who were 65 years of age or older. The median age was 36 years. For every 100 females, there were 87.3 males. For every 100 females age 18 and over, there were 81.5 males.

The median income for a household in the city was $22,599, and the median income for a family was $30,074. Males had a median income of $26,977 versus $18,565 for females. The per capita income for the city was $12,550. About 20.5% of families and 26.3% of the population were below the poverty line, including 37.1% of those under age 18 and 26.2% of those age 65 or over.

== Education ==
Lepanto is the home of the East Poinsett County School District that provides elementary and secondary education from prekindergarten through grade 12, with students graduating from East Poinsett County High School.

The Lepanto School District consolidated into the East Poinsett district on July 1, 1986.

== In popular culture ==
Lepanto was a site for the filming of the TV movie adaptation of John Grisham's book A Painted House.

== Notable people ==
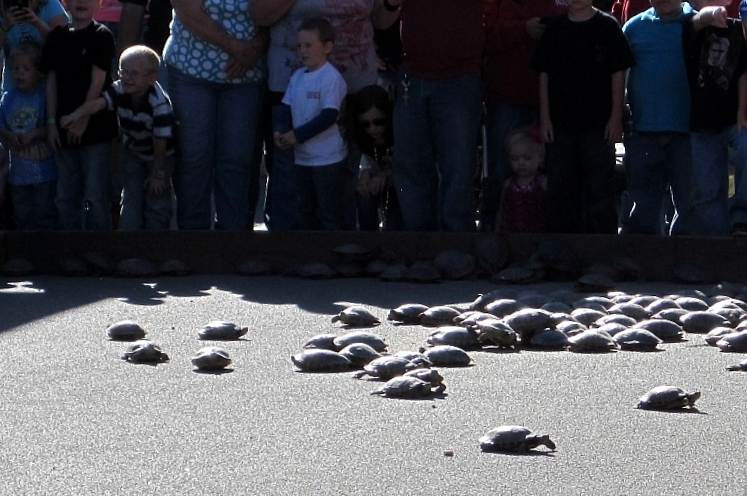
2011 Terrapin Derby

- James R. Hendrix (1925–2002), Medal of Honor recipient for actions in the Battle of the Bulge during 1944.
- Buddy Jewell (born 1961), American country music singer
- Malik Monk (born 1998), National Basketball Association (NBA) shooting guard
- Marcus Monk (born 1986), National Football League (NFL) wide receiver
