= 2017–18 Auburn Tigers men's basketball team =

American college basketball season

2017–18 Auburn Tigers men's basketball

SEC regular season co-champions

NCAA tournament, Second Round
- Conference: Southeastern Conference

Ranking
- Coaches: No. 23
- AP: No. 19
- Record: 26–8 (13–5 SEC)
- Head coach: Bruce Pearl (4th season)
- Assistant coaches: Harris Adler; Steven Pearl
- Home arena: Auburn Arena

2017–18 Southeastern Conference men's basketball standings
	Conf.				Overall
Team	W		L	PCT	W		L	PCT
No. 19 Auburn	13	–	5	.722	26	–	8	.765
No. 13 Tennessee	13	–	5	.722	26	–	9	.743
No. 23 Florida	11	–	7	.611	21	–	13	.618
No. 18 Kentucky †	10	–	8	.556	26	–	11	.703
Missouri	10	–	8	.556	20	–	13	.606
Arkansas	10	–	8	.556	23	–	12	.657
Mississippi State	9	–	9	.500	25	–	12	.676
Texas A&M	9	–	9	.500	22	–	13	.629
Alabama	8	–	10	.444	20	–	16	.556
LSU	8	–	10	.444	18	–	15	.545
Georgia	7	–	11	.389	18	–	15	.545
South Carolina	7	–	11	.389	17	–	16	.515
Vanderbilt	6	–	12	.333	12	–	20	.375
Ole Miss	5	–	13	.278	12	–	20	.375
† 2018 SEC tournament winner Rankings from AP poll

The 2017–18 Auburn Tigers men's basketball team represented Auburn University during the 2017–18 NCAA Division I men's basketball season as a member of the Southeastern Conference. The team's head coach was Bruce Pearl in his fourth season at Auburn. The team played their home games at the Auburn Arena in Auburn, Alabama. They finished the season 26–8, 13–5 in SEC play to win a share of the SEC regular season championship. They lost to Alabama in the quarterfinals of the SEC tournament. The Tigers received an at-large bid to the NCAA tournament for the first time since 2003, where they defeated College of Charleston to advance to the Second Round where they lost to Clemson.

== Previous season ==
The Tigers finished the 2016–17 season 18–14, 7–11 in SEC play to finish in 11th place. They lost in the first round of the SEC tournament to Missouri.

== FBI investigation ==
On September 26, 2017, federal prosecutors in New York announced charges of fraud and corruption against 10 people involved in college basketball, including Auburn associate head coach Chuck Person. The charges allege that Person and others allegedly received benefits from financial advisers and others to influence student-athletes to retain their services. Shortly thereafter, the school suspended Person without pay. Person was indicted by a federal grand jury and subsequently fired by Auburn on November 7, 2017.

Before Auburn's exhibition game on November 2, 2017, the school announced that it would hold players Austin Wiley and Danjel Purifoy out of games indefinitely due to eligibility concerns raised over the FBI investigation. On January 12, 2018, the NCAA ruled that Wiley would regain his eligibility in the 2018–19 season, ruling him ineligible for the remainder of the 2017–18 season.

== Offseason ==
=== Departures ===
Name	Number	Pos.	Height	Weight	Year	Hometown	Reason for departure
T. J. Dunans	4	G	6'5"	174	RS Senior	Atlanta, GA	Graduated
LaRon Smith	12	F	6'8"	215	RS Senior	Palm Bay, FL	Graduated
T. J. Lang	23	G	6'7"	210	Junior	Mobile, AL	Transferred to South Florida
Mike Cohen	25	G	5'10"	175	Freshman	Voorhees, NJ	Walk-on; didn't return
Devin Waddell	31	F	6'5"	225	Senior	Summerfield, NC	Graduated
Ronnie Johnson	35	G	6'0"	180	RS Senior	Indianapolis, IN	Graduated

=== Incoming transfers ===
Name	Number	Pos.	Height	Weight	Year	Hometown	Previous School
Malik Dunbar	14	G/F	6'6"	225	Junior	North Augusta, SC	Junior college transferred College of Central Florida
Samir Doughty	20	G	6'4"	185	RS Sophomore	Philadelphia, PA	Transferred from VCU. Under NCAA transfer rules, Doughty will have to sit out for the 2017–18 season. Will have three years of remaining eligibility.

=== 2017 recruiting class ===
College recruiting information
Name	Hometown	School	Height	Weight	Commit date
Chuma Okeke; SF	Fairburn, GA	Westlake High School	6 ft 7 in (2.01 m)	225 lb (102 kg)	Jul 24, 2016
Chuma Okeke; SF	Recruit ratings: Scout: Rivals: 247Sports: ESPN:				
Davion Mitchell; PG	Hinesville, GA	Liberty County School	6 ft 1 in (1.85 m)	185 lb (84 kg)	Oct 15, 2016
Davion Mitchell; PG	Recruit ratings: Scout: Rivals: 247Sports: ESPN:				
Overall recruit ranking: Scout: 21 Rivals: 11 ESPN: 28
Note: In many cases, Scout, Rivals, 247Sports, On3, and ESPN may conflict in their listings of height and weight.; In these cases, the average was taken. ESPN grades are on a 100-point scale.; Sources: "Auburn 2017 Basketball Commitments". Rivals.; "2017 Auburn Basketball Commits". Scout.; "ESPN". ESPN.; "Scout.com Team Recruiting Rankings". Scout.; "2017 Team Ranking". Rivals.

== Roster ==
2017–18 Auburn Tigers men's basketball team
Players
Coaches

Pos.	#	Name	Height	Weight	Year	Previous school	Hometown
F	0	Horace Spencer	6 ft 9 in (2.06 m)	225 lb (102 kg)	Jr	Findlay Prep	Warminster, PA
G	1	Jared Harper	5 ft 10 in (1.78 m)	170 lb (77 kg)	So	Pebblebrook	Mableton, GA
G	2	Bryce Brown	6 ft 3 in (1.91 m)	198 lb (90 kg)	Jr	Tucker	Stone Mountain, GA
F	3	Danjel Purifoy	6 ft 7 in (2.01 m)	230 lb (104 kg)	RS So	Hargrave Military Academy	Centerville, AL
F	4	Chuma Okeke	6 ft 8 in (2.03 m)	230 lb (104 kg)	Fr	Westlake	Atlanta, GA
G	5	Mustapha Heron	6 ft 5 in (1.96 m)	218 lb (99 kg)	So	Martin Luther King Jr. Sacred Heart	Waterbury, CT
G	10	Davion Mitchell	6 ft 1 in (1.85 m)	200 lb (91 kg)	Fr	Liberty County	Hinesville, GA
G	12	Devontae Williams (W)	6 ft 4 in (1.93 m)	215 lb (98 kg)	So	Opp	Opp, AL
F	13	DeSean Murray	6 ft 4 in (1.93 m)	225 lb (102 kg)	RS Jr	Northside; Presbyterian	Stanley, NC
G/F	14	Malik Dunbar	6 ft 6 in (1.98 m)	230 lb (104 kg)	Jr	Spring Valley; College of Central Florida	North Augusta, SC
G	20	Samir Doughty (I) (redshirt)	6 ft 4 in (1.93 m)	187 lb (85 kg)	RS So	Mathematics, Civics & Science Charter; VCU	Philadelphia, PA
G	21	Patrick Keim	6 ft 0 in (1.83 m)	186 lb (84 kg)	Sr	Mountain Brook	Birmingham, AL
G	22	Will Macoy (W)	6 ft 4 in (1.93 m)	190 lb (86 kg)	So	Vestavia Hills	Birmingham, AL
G	23	Jaylan Gaither (W)	6 ft 4 in (1.93 m)	195 lb (88 kg)	So	Hoover	Alès, France
F	24	Anfernee McLemore	6 ft 7 in (2.01 m)	220 lb (100 kg)	So	Worth County	Warwick, GA
C	41	Cole Blackstock (W)	6 ft 9 in (2.06 m)	260 lb (118 kg)	Jr	Brooks	Killen, AL
F	44	Heath Huff (W)	6 ft 10 in (2.08 m)	250 lb (113 kg)	RS Fr	Lee Scott Academy	Auburn, AL
C	50	Austin Wiley	6 ft 11 in (2.11 m)	260 lb (118 kg)	So	Spain Park	Hoover, AL
F	52	Trey Tate (W)	6 ft 6 in (1.98 m)	230 lb (104 kg)	Jr	Rehobeth	Dothan, AL

Head coach

- Bruce Pearl (Boston College)

Assistant coach(es)

- Harris Adler (Rowan)
- Steven Pearl (Tennessee)

Legend

- (C) Team captain
- (S) Suspended
- (I) Ineligible
- (W) Walk-on
- Injured
- Current redshirt

Roster

== Schedule and results ==
Date time, TV	Rank^{#}	Opponent^{#}	Result	Record	High points	High rebounds	High assists	Site (attendance) city, state
Exhibition
November 2, 2017*; 7:00 pm		Barry	L 95–100 ^{OT}		21 – Heron	8 – Murray	7 – Harper	Auburn Arena (6,374); Auburn, AL
Non-conference regular season
November 10, 2017*; 7:00 pm, SECN+		Norfolk State	W 102–74	1–0	31 – Brown	7 – Tied	5 – Heron	Auburn Arena (7,419); Auburn, AL
November 16, 2017*; 10:30 am, ESPNU		vs. Indiana State; Charleston Classic quarterfinals	W 83–64	2–0	15 – Brown	12 – Murray	7 – Harper	TD Arena (2,136); Charleston, SC
November 17, 2017*; 10:00 am, ESPN2		vs. Temple; Charleston Classic semifinals	L 74–88	2–1	19 – McLemore	11 – Murray	7 – Harper	TD Arena (1,970); Charleston, SC
November 19, 2017*; 6:00 pm, ESPNU		vs. Hofstra; Charleston Classic 3rd place game	W 89–78	3–1	22 – Heron	6 – Tied	3 – Mitchell	TD Arena (2,263); Charleston, SC
November 24, 2017*; 6:00 pm, SECN		Winthrop	W 119–85	4–1	31 – Heron	10 – Heron	7 – Harper	Auburn Arena (7,197); Auburn, AL
November 29, 2017*; 6:00 pm, CBSSN		at Dayton; Charleston Classic non-bracket game	W 73–60	5–1	21 – Heron	14 – McLemore	3 – Harper	UD Arena (13,125); Dayton, OH
December 3, 2017*; 2:00 pm, SECN+		George Mason	W 79–63	6–1	19 – Heron	10 – McLemore	3 – Tied	Auburn Arena (6,164); Auburn, AL
December 6, 2017*; 7:00 pm, SECN+		Gardner–Webb	W 80–55	7–1	20 – Murray	11 – McLemore	10 – Harper	Auburn Arena (6,232); Auburn, AL
December 9, 2017*; 3:30 pm, SECN		UAB; Rivalry	W 85–80	8–1	27 – Brown	9 – McLemore	5 – Harper	Auburn Arena (7,565); Auburn, AL
December 16, 2017*; 5:00 pm, SECN		vs. Middle Tennessee; BHM JAM	W 76–70	9–1	16 – Tied	7 – Spencer	7 – Harper	Legacy Arena (7,209); Birmingham, AL
December 19, 2017*; 7:00 pm, OVCDN		at Murray State	W 81–77	10–1	18 – Murray	9 – Murray	4 – Harper	CFSB Center (6,478); Murray, KY
December 23, 2017*; 1:30 pm, ESPN2		UConn	W 89–64	11–1	13 – Tied	10 – Spencer	7 – Harper	Auburn Arena (8,039); Auburn, AL
December 30, 2017*; 2:30 pm, SECN		Cornell	W 98–77	12–1	19 – Brown	10 – Okeke	7 – Harper	Auburn Arena (8,493); Auburn, AL
SEC regular season
January 2, 2018; 6:00 pm, ESPNU		at No. 23 Tennessee	W 94–84	13–1 (1–0)	18 – Tied	9 – Tied	4 – Okeke	Thompson–Boling Arena (14,755); Knoxville, TN
January 6, 2018; 5:00 pm, ESPNU		No. 22 Arkansas	W 88–77	14–1 (2–0)	17 – Heron	8 – Murray	8 – Harper	Auburn Arena (8,950); Auburn, AL
January 9, 2018; 8:00 pm, ESPNU	No. 22	Ole Miss	W 85–70	15–1 (3–0)	16 – Murray	9 – McLemore	4 – Harper	Auburn Arena (9,121); Auburn, AL
January 13, 2018; 2:30 pm, SECN	No. 22	at Mississippi State	W 76–68	16–1 (4–0)	23 – Brown	9 – Murray	4 – Harper	Humphrey Coliseum (8,443); Starkville, MS
January 17, 2018; 6:00 pm, SECN	No. 17	at Alabama; Rivalry	L 71–76	16–2 (4–1)	12 – Brown	10 – Murray	5 – Mitchell	Coleman Coliseum (15,383); Tuscaloosa, AL
January 20, 2018; 5:00 pm, SECN	No. 17	Georgia	W 79–65	17–2 (5–1)	28 – Brown	8 – McLemore	6 – Harper	Auburn Arena (9,121); Auburn, AL
January 24, 2018; 8:00 pm, SECN	No. 19	at Missouri	W 91–73	18–2 (6–1)	21 – Harper	12 – Heron	6 – Harper	Mizzou Arena (15,061); Columbia, MO
January 27, 2018; 5:00 pm, SECN	No. 19	LSU	W 95–70	19–2 (7–1)	21 – Heron	9 – Heron	8 – Harper	Auburn Arena (9,121); Auburn, AL
January 30, 2018; 8:00 pm, SECN	No. 11	at Ole Miss	W 79–70	20–2 (8–1)	23 – Brown	10 – Murray	7 – Harper	The Pavilion at Ole Miss (8,043); Oxford, MS
February 3, 2018; 7:30 pm, SECN	No. 11	Vanderbilt	W 93–81	21–2 (9–1)	25 – Brown	5 – Tied	14 – Harper	Auburn Arena (9,121); Auburn, AL
February 7, 2018; 8:00 pm, ESPN2	No. 8	Texas A&M	L 80–81	21–3 (9–2)	28 – Heron	4 – Tied	8 – Harper	Auburn Arena (7,631); Auburn, AL
February 10, 2018; 2:30 pm, SECN	No. 8	at Georgia	W 78–61	22–3 (10–2)	24 – Harper	7 – Murray	7 – Harper	Stegeman Coliseum (10,523); Athens, GA
February 14, 2018; 8:00 pm, ESPN2	No. 10	Kentucky	W 76–66	23–3 (11–2)	18 – Tied	11 – Tied	7 – Harper	Auburn Arena (9,121); Auburn, AL
February 17, 2018; 2:30 pm, SECN	No. 10	at South Carolina	L 75–84	23–4 (11–3)	16 – Heron	9 – Okeke	2 – Okeke	Colonial Life Arena (14,995); Columbia, SC
February 21, 2018; 7:30 pm, SECN	No. 12	Alabama; Rivalry	W 90–71	24–4 (12–3)	21 – Harper	10 – Okeke	6 – Harper	Auburn Arena (9,121); Auburn, AL
February 24, 2018; 7:30 pm, SECN	No. 12	at Florida	L 66–72	24–5 (12–4)	22 – Heron	10 – Okeke	5 – Brown	O'Connell Center (10,503); Gainesville, FL
February 27, 2018; 8:00 pm, SECN	No. 14	at Arkansas	L 82–91	24–6 (12–5)	28 – Heron	10 – Okeke	5 – Harper	Bud Walton Arena (15,733); Fayetteville, AR
March 3, 2018; 2:30 pm, SECN	No. 14	South Carolina	W 79–70	25–6 (13–5)	29 – Brown	9 – Okeke	8 – Harper	Auburn Arena (9,121); Auburn, AL
SEC Tournament
March 9, 2018; 12:00 pm, ESPN	(1) No. 16	vs. (9) Alabama; Quarterfinals	L 63–81	25–7	18 – Heron	8 – Murray	4 – Harper	Scottrade Center (16,364); St. Louis, MO
NCAA tournament
March 16, 2018; 6:27 pm, truTV	(4 MW) No. 19	vs. (13 MW) College of Charleston; First Round	W 62–58	26–7	16 – Heron	9 – Okeke	2 – Tied	Viejas Arena (10,092); San Diego, CA
March 18, 2018; 6:10 pm, TBS	(4 MW) No. 19	vs. (5 MW) No. 20 Clemson; Second Round	L 53–84	26–8	12 – Tied	9 – Spencer	3 – Okeke	Viejas Arena (11,628); San Diego, CA
*Non-conference game. ^{#}Rankings from AP Poll. (#) Tournament seedings in parentheses. MW=Midwest. All times are in Central Time.

== Rankings ==
Ranking movements Legend: ██ Increase in ranking ██ Decrease in ranking RV = Received votes
	Week																			
Poll	Pre	1	2	3	4	5	6	7	8	9	10	11	12	13	14	15	16	17	18	Final
AP								RV	RV	RV	22	17	19	11	8	10	12	14	16	19
Coaches									RV	RV	24	20	19	13	9	11	13	15	21	23

*AP does not release post-NCAA tournament rankings
