= Holy Cross High School (Connecticut) =

Private school in Waterbury, Connecticut, United States

- "Our Only Hope"

Location
- 587 Oronoke Road; Waterbury, New Haven County, Connecticut 06708; United States; 41°31′52″N 73°3′54″W

Information
- Type: Private, Coeducational
- Motto: Ave Crux, Spes Unica (Hail the Cross, Our Only Hope)
- Religious affiliation: Roman Catholic
- Established: 1968 (58 years ago)
- Founder: Basil Moreau
- Status: Active
- CEEB code: 070838
- President: Thomas Pellegrino
- Principal: Thomas J. Pompei
- Assistant Principal: Catherine Xeller
- Grades: 9–12
- Enrollment: 500 (2015)
- Average class size: 21
- Campus size: 37 acres (including playing fields and XC course)
- Campus type: Suburban
- Colors: Green and gold
- Slogan: "Educating Hearts and Minds since 1968"
- Athletics conference: Naugatuck Valley League
- Team name: Crusaders
- Rival: Sacred Heart High School (Connecticut)
- Accreditation: New England Association of Schools and Colleges
- Publication: Holy Cross Connections
- Communities served: Waterbury, Watertown, Wolcott, Naugatuck, Newtown, Prospect, Woodbury, Middlebury, Oxford, Beacon Falls, Cheshire, Southington, Southbury, Torrington, Litchfield, Roxbury, Thomaston, Derby, Ansonia, Seymour
- Website: www.holycrossct.org

Holy Cross High School is a Catholic secondary school founded in Waterbury, Connecticut, in 1968 by the Congregation of Holy Cross. It is one of the largest Catholic secondary schools in Connecticut, situated on thirty-seven acres in the West End of Waterbury, Connecticut, accessible via Route 8 and I-84. It is not part of the Roman Catholic Archdiocese of Hartford.

Holy Cross has a total enrollment of 500 students, in four grades, with each grade averaging 125 students. Originally an all-boys institution, it became co-educational in 1975 when it merged with the Waterbury Catholic High School, an all-girls school.

The Holy Cross High School campus maintains a campus-wide WiFi signal; a library; a large instrumental and choral music room with adjacent practice rooms; science labs; a foreign language lab; a guidance complex; The Blasius Family auditorium, which seats ~750; a full-service cafeteria; the Timothy J. McDonald Gymnasium; the Stephen J. Ross Fitness Center; and digital classrooms and art studios in the Alex Family Gallery Art and Technology Center. Holy Cross recently invested in the installation of 513 solar panels atop the building's roof.

== Origins ==
In September 1966, Archbishop Henry J. O'Brien announced that an all-boys Roman Catholic high school in Waterbury was scheduled to open in September 1968. The original plans were designed to accommodate 1,200 students, parking for 400 cars, and facilities for an extensive physical education program.

On May 5, 1967, Holy Cross High School held its groundbreaking ceremony. The Brothers of Holy Cross agreed to staff the new facility. Brother Robert Fontaine coordinated the opening of the new high school, eventually serving as its first guidance counselor. The first entrance exam was administered on February 24, 1968. Through the school's recruitment efforts, 325 students were scheduled to begin their studies at Holy Cross High School. The staff, headed by first Principal Brother Patrick Halpin, numbered ten. Plans called for eight classrooms and a residence for the Brothers to be completed by September 1, 1968.

However, progress was hampered by a work-strike in the steel metal trades. As a result of the delays in its completion, the new school resorted to using classrooms at a nearby school, Waterbury Catholic High School, in the late afternoon and early evening. After Waterbury Catholic High School closed its doors in the afternoon each day, Holy Cross High School would begin its school day. On October 7, 1968, Holy Cross High School officially opened its doors at the newly built facility. At that time, the school's annual tuition rate was $290. The school's founding faculty in 1968 included, among others, Brother John McGovern, the first band director of the school, who later became Academic Vice Principal in 1972, before leaving for New York to lead Holy Cross High School in Flushing. In 1989, McGovern returned to the Connecticut area to become Superintendent of Schools for the Archdiocese of Hartford.

Holy Cross High School graduated its first class in 1972.

== Admission ==
Admission to the school is competitive, requiring a 3.5 hour placement test, a transcript from the applicant's grammar school, a letter of recommendation, and an essay.

Holy Cross scholarships and financial aid to those that qualify. Applicants may be eligible for merit scholarships if they score within the top 10%. Scholarships are usually renewable yearly. Once admitted, students have the opportunity to take proficiency tests in mathematics and/or foreign language to advance their freshman year placing (Ex. A student may take the Spanish proficiency exam to place him/herself out of Spanish 1 CP and into Spanish 2 Honors or even Spanish 3 Honors). Financial aid is also given to those in need in the form of grants. Holy Cross also has an installment program so that parents can pay tuition in increments over the academic year.

== Faculty and accreditation ==
The Brothers of Holy Cross, Eastern Province, continue Basil Moreau's vision through sponsorship and staffing of the school, in association with the Sisters of the Congregation of Notre Dame and many dedicated lay men and women, many of whom hold advanced degrees and/or certificates of advanced study.

Holy Cross High School is accredited by the New England Association of Schools and Colleges, and meets Connecticut certification standards. The school belongs to the National Catholic Education Association and the Connecticut Association of Schools.

== Academic Course Levels ==
Holy Cross offers a selection of course levels, all of which the school considers "College Preparatory." The various levels offer students the ability to challenge themselves beyond standard coursework, while achieving a higher Adjusted Grade Point Average. The Adjusted Grade Point Average is only used to determine class rank. Only the top ⅓ of the class has an official rank.

The levels available to students are as follows, with their corresponding rank in brackets:

- Level 3 - College Preparatory (CP) [-9]
- Level 2 - College Preparatory Advanced (CPA) [0]
- Level 1 - Honors [+9]
- Level AP - Advanced Placement [+12]

Additionally, Holy Cross has partnerships with and offers college courses from the University of Connecticut and Post University.

Through the University of Connecticut's Early College Experience program, students may enroll in a variety of courses and earn college credits issued by UCONN. Courses are taught by Holy Cross Faculty, who have been certified by the University of Connecticut, as full-year courses. Upon the completion and passing of a selected course, students are awarded transferable College Credit by the university. Holy Cross classifies UCONN ECE courses as "Level AP," and as such students receive additional points on their Adjusted Grade Point Average.

Post University courses are offered through Post's online High School Academy. Holy Cross grades these courses as pass/fail; however, college credits through Post are awarded after passing the course.

== Athletics ==
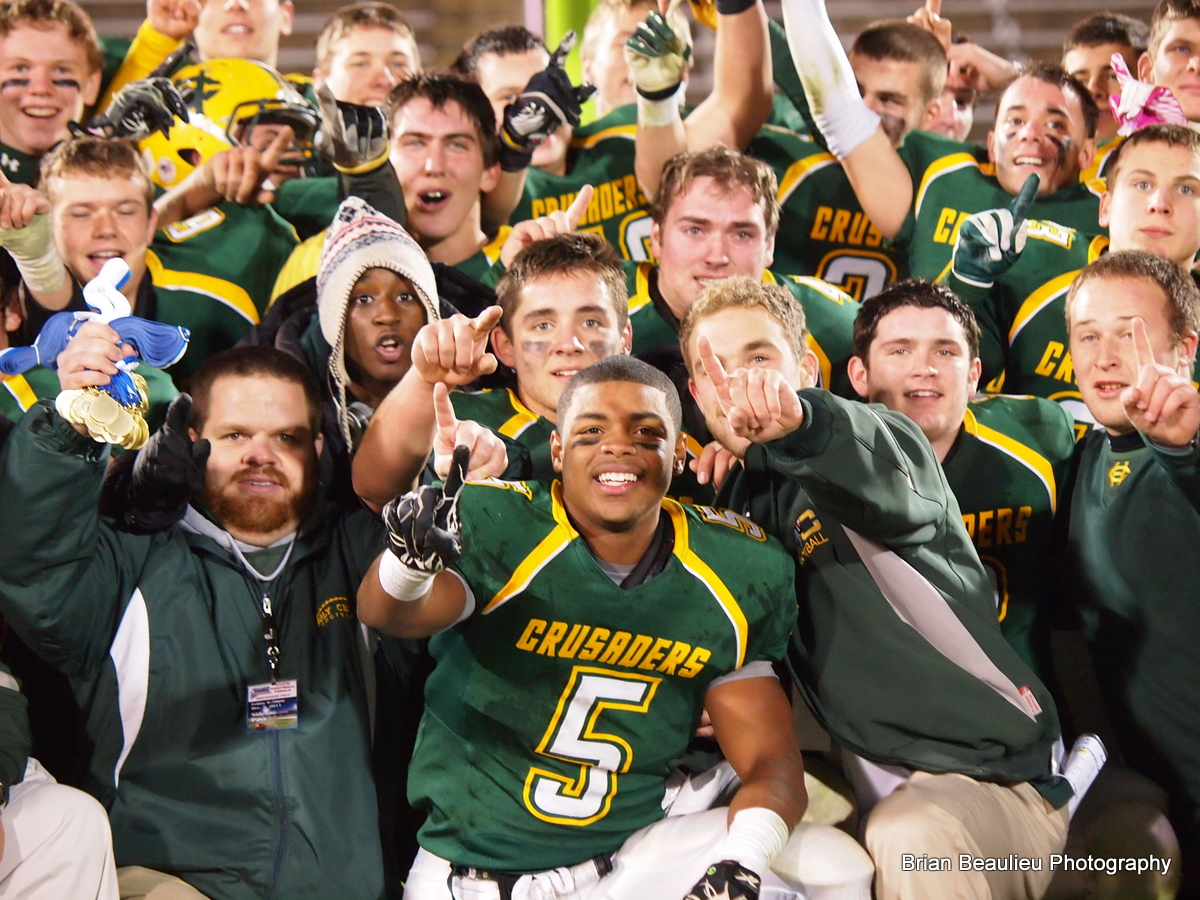
State Victory 2011

Holy Cross is a member of the Naugatuck Valley League and the Connecticut Interscholastic Athletic Council. The Holy Cross athletic program is respected statewide for its competitiveness and the positive attitudes and good sportsmanship of its players and coaches. The Crusaders have a history of success as evidenced by the many awards, acknowledgments, and trophies displayed throughout the building. The Crusaders compete in twenty-two varsity sports for boys and girls. In 2011, the Crusaders began its lacrosse program at the JV level. In 2023, Director of Campus Ministry Kyle Piatak pioneered Holy Cross's E-Sports program, featuring a variety of competitive-style games such as Rocket League and Mario Kart 8.

Holy Cross High School's sports teams are as follows:

- Boys and Girls Soccer
- Boys and Girls Cross Country
- Football
- Girls Volleyball
- Girls Swimming and Diving
- Boys and Girls Indoor Track
- Boys and Girls Basketball
- Boys Swimming and Diving
- Boys Wrestling
- Baseball
- Softball
- Boys and Girls Track and Field
- Boys and Girls Tennis
- Golf
- Boys Lacrosse
- Cheerleading
- E-Sports

Along with these sports, Holy Cross also has intramural basketball, bowling, ultimate Frisbee, and bocce.

=== Football ===
Holy Cross High School is well known in Connecticut for its football program. In 2006, the team won the first football state championship in the school's history, the Class SS State Championship, defeating Stratford 40–0. They were ranked third among all teams in the state, following Greenwich and Ansonia. In 2011 the Crusaders earned their second state championship with a 34–27 win over Cromwell in the Class S State Championship. The 12-2 Crusaders suffered only two defeats that season, both to Ansonia, the Class M State Champion. They finished ranked eighth in the state.

=== Swimming and diving ===
The swimming and diving team is a co-ed athletic team that is respected throughout the NVL and the state. In 2019, the team won their first state championship with 709 points, defeating Brookfield High School which had 542.5 points. The 2018–2019 season was also notable because they only had one loss to Pomperaug High School during the Winter Invitational, finishing second. After cancellations in 2020 and 2021, the Crusaders defended their state title in a win over runner-up, Woodland Regional High School, 546–541.5.

=== "Crusader Cru" ===
Starting in 2010, the "Crusader Crazies" changed their title to the Crusader Cru. The loyal fans of Holy Cross' basketball and football programs travel around the state to turn any game into a 'home' atmosphere for the teams.

=== State Championship Wins ===
Wins in CIAC State Championships
| Sport | Class | Year(s) |
|---|---|---|
| Baseball | S | 2017 |
| Basketball (boys) | L | 2000 |
| Basketball (boys) | LL | 1988, 1995 |
| Basketball (girls) | M | 2007, 2022 |
| Cheer | S | 2020 |
| Cheer | M | 2000, 2001, 2002, 2003, 2004, 2006, 2007, 2009, 2011, 2013 |
| Football | SS | 2006 |
| Football | S | 2011 |
| Golf(boys) | III | 2013 |
| Golf(boys) | II | 1995, 1996 |
| Soccer (girls) | S | 2019, 2021 |
| Softball | S | 2015, 2016, 2017 |
| Softball | LL | 1989 |
| Swimming (boys) | S | 2019, 2022 |

== Student activities ==
Holy Cross student activities are open to all students. Student activities offer the opportunity to explore lessons presented in class, learn new skills and develop leadership ability. More than thirty co-curricular organizations exist in conjunction with a well-respected student government. The student government at Holy Cross includes an executive board made of four elected class officers from each class, a liaison from the Presidents' Council, a liaison from the Athletic Council, and seven members of the Senior Life Board appointed by the institution's administration. The Student Government also consists of the Presidents' Council, which is made up of the president from every club at Holy Cross and the Athletic Council, which contains various members of the school's many athletic teams. This large student government is headed by one Student Government President who is elected at the end of his or her junior year by that year's executive board to preside over the following year.

Community service is a major component of every club and committee's activities. Some projects are school-wide while others are particular to the organization. Holy Cross has a history of strong student leadership and community service as evidenced by their recognition as a State of Connecticut Gold Council of Excellence recipient and as a National Gold Council of Excellence designee.

== Notable alumni ==
- Allie DiMeco, actor and multi-instrumentalist (The Naked Brothers Band)
- David Gravel, sprint car racing driver
- Marissa Follo (Perry), Broadway star
- Tony Hanson, Class of 1973, UConn Husky of Honor
- Michael Mallory, professional basketball player
- Dylan McDermott, actor (American Horror Story)
- John G. Rowland, Class of 1975, Governor of the State of Connecticut (1995–2004)
