= 2016–17 Auburn Tigers men's basketball team =

American college basketball season

2016–17 Auburn Tigers men's basketball
- Conference: Southeastern Conference
- Record: 18–14 (7–11 SEC)
- Head coach: Bruce Pearl (3rd season)
- Assistant coaches: Chuck Person; Harris Adler; Chad Dollar
- Home arena: Auburn Arena

2016–17 Southeastern Conference men's basketball standings
	Conf.				Overall
Team	W		L	PCT	W		L	PCT
No. 6 Kentucky †	16	–	2	.889	32	–	6	.842
No. 20 Florida	14	–	4	.778	27	–	9	.750
Arkansas	12	–	6	.667	26	–	10	.722
South Carolina	12	–	6	.667	26	–	11	.703
Ole Miss	10	–	8	.556	22	–	14	.611
Alabama	10	–	8	.556	19	–	15	.559
Vanderbilt	10	–	8	.556	19	–	16	.543
Georgia	9	–	9	.500	19	–	15	.559
Texas A&M	8	–	10	.444	16	–	15	.516
Tennessee	8	–	10	.444	16	–	16	.500
Auburn	7	–	11	.389	18	–	14	.563
Mississippi State	6	–	12	.333	16	–	16	.500
LSU	2	–	16	.111	10	–	21	.323
Missouri	2	–	16	.111	8	–	24	.250
† 2017 SEC tournament winner Rankings from AP poll

The 2016–17 Auburn Tigers men's basketball team represented Auburn University during the 2016–17 NCAA Division I men's basketball season. The team's head coach was Bruce Pearl, in his third season at Auburn. The team played their home games at the Auburn Arena in Auburn, Alabama as a member of the Southeastern Conference. They finished the season 18–14, 7–11 in SEC play to finish in 11th place. They lost in the first round of the SEC tournament to Missouri.

== Previous season ==
The Tigers finished the season 11–20, 5–13 in SEC play to finish in 13th place. They lost to Tennessee in the first round of the SEC tournament.

== Departures ==
Name	Number	Pos.	Height	Weight	Year	Hometown	Notes
Kareem Canty	1	G	6'1"	185	RS Junior	Harlem, NY	Declare for 2016 NBA draft
Cinmeon Bowers	5	F	6'7"	250	Senior	Racine, WI	Graduated
Tyler Harris	12	F	6'10"	228	RS Senior	Dix Hills, NY	Graduated
Tahj Shamsid-Deen	13	G	5'9"	175	Junior	Decatur, GA	Retired from basketball due to past injuries
Jonathan Walker	20	G	6'3"	197	Senior	Madison, WI	Walk-on; graduated
Zach Allison	22	G	6'2"	166	Freshman	Pelham, AL	Walk-on; transferred to Wallace State CC
Jordon Granger	25	F	6'8"	220	Senior	St. Louis, MO	Graduated
Cole Stockton	42	G	6'4"	195	Senior	Auburn, AL	Walk-on; graduated
New Williams	44	G	6'2	175	Sophomore	Inglewood, CA	Left team mid-season
Trayvon Reed	50	C	7'2"	245	Sophomore	Mobile, AL	Transferred to Texas Southern

=== Incoming transfers ===
Name	Number	Pos.	Height	Weight	Year	Hometown	Previous School
LaRon Smith	12	F	6'8"	215	RS Senior	Palm Bay, FL	Transferred from Bethune-Cookman. Will be eligible to play immediately due to graduating from Bethune-Cookman.
DeSean Murray	13	F	6'5"	225	Junior	Stanley, NC	Transferred from Presbyterian. Under NCAA transfer rules, Murray will have to sit out for the 2016–17 season. Will have two years of remaining eligibility.
Ronnie Johnson	35	G	6'0"	180	RS Senior	Indianapolis, IN	Transferred from Houston. Will be eligible to play immediately due to graduating from Houston.

== Recruits ==
College recruiting information
Name	Hometown	School	Height	Weight	Commit date
Mustapha Heron #4 SG	West Haven, CT	Sacred Heart High School	6 ft 4 in (1.93 m)	210 lb (95 kg)	Aug 16, 2015
Mustapha Heron #4 SG	Recruit ratings: Scout: Rivals: 247Sports: ESPN:				
Austin Wiley #6 C	Birmingham, AL	Spain Park High School	6 ft 10 in (2.08 m)	245 lb (111 kg)	Sep 26, 2015
Austin Wiley #6 C	Recruit ratings: Scout: Rivals: 247Sports: ESPN:				
Jared Harper #18 PG	Atlanta, GA	Pebblebrook High School	5 ft 10 in (1.78 m)	160 lb (73 kg)	Mar 14, 2015
Jared Harper #18 PG	Recruit ratings: Scout: Rivals: 247Sports: ESPN:				
Anfernee McLemore #31 PF	Sylvester, GA	Worth County High School	6 ft 8 in (2.03 m)	210 lb (95 kg)	Aug 4, 2015
Anfernee McLemore #31 PF	Recruit ratings: Scout: Rivals: 247Sports: ESPN:				
Overall recruit ranking: Scout: 21 Rivals: 11 ESPN: 28
Note: In many cases, Scout, Rivals, 247Sports, On3, and ESPN may conflict in their listings of height and weight.; In these cases, the average was taken. ESPN grades are on a 100-point scale.; Sources: "Auburn 2016 Basketball Commitments". Rivals.; "2016 Auburn Basketball Commits". Scout.; "ESPN". ESPN.; "Scout.com Team Recruiting Rankings". Scout.; "2016 Team Ranking". Rivals.

== Future recruits ==
=== 2017–18 team recruits ===
College recruiting information
Name	Hometown	School	Height	Weight	Commit date
Chuma Okeke; SF	Fairburn, GA	Westlake High School	6 ft 7 in (2.01 m)	225 lb (102 kg)	Jul 24, 2016
Chuma Okeke; SF	Recruit ratings: Scout: Rivals: 247Sports: ESPN:				
Davion Mitchell; PG	Hinesville, GA	Liberty County School	6 ft 1 in (1.85 m)	185 lb (84 kg)	Oct 15, 2016
Davion Mitchell; PG	Recruit ratings: Scout: Rivals: 247Sports: ESPN:				
Overall recruit ranking: Scout: 21 Rivals: 11 ESPN: 28
Note: In many cases, Scout, Rivals, 247Sports, On3, and ESPN may conflict in their listings of height and weight.; In these cases, the average was taken. ESPN grades are on a 100-point scale.; Sources: "Auburn 2017 Basketball Commitments". Rivals.; "2017 Auburn Basketball Commits". Scout.; "ESPN". ESPN.; "Scout.com Team Recruiting Rankings". Scout.; "2017 Team Ranking". Rivals.

== Roster ==
2016–17 Auburn Tigers men's basketball team
Players
Coaches

Pos.	#	Name	Height	Weight	Year	Previous school	Hometown
F	0	Horace Spencer	6 ft 9 in (2.06 m)	220 lb (100 kg)	So	Findlay Prep	Warminster, PA
G	1	Jared Harper	5 ft 10 in (1.78 m)	165 lb (75 kg)	Fr	Pebblebrook	Mableton, GA
G	2	Bryce Brown	6 ft 3 in (1.91 m)	195 lb (88 kg)	So	Tucker	Stone Mountain, GA
F	3	Danjel Purifoy	6 ft 7 in (2.01 m)	230 lb (104 kg)	RS Fr	Hargrave Military Academy	Centerville, AL
G	4	T. J. Dunans	6 ft 5 in (1.96 m)	174 lb (79 kg)	RS Sr	Columbia State CC	Atlanta, GA
G	5	Mustapha Heron	6 ft 5 in (1.96 m)	215 lb (98 kg)	Fr	Martin Luther King Jr. Sacred Heart	Waterbury, CT
F	10	Heath Huff (W)	6 ft 10 in (2.08 m)	250 lb (113 kg)	Fr	Lee Scott Academy	Auburn, AL
F	12	LaRon Smith	6 ft 8 in (2.03 m)	215 lb (98 kg)	RS Sr	Heritage; Bethune-Cookman	Palm Bay, FL
F	13	DeSean Murray (redshirt)	6 ft 4 in (1.93 m)	230 lb (104 kg)	Jr	Northside; Presbyterian	Stanley, NC
G	21	Patrick Keim (W)	6 ft 0 in (1.83 m)	186 lb (84 kg)	Jr	Mountain Brook	Birmingham, AL
G	22	Will Macoy (W)	6 ft 4 in (1.93 m)	180 lb (82 kg)	Fr	Vestavia Hills	Birmingham, AL
G	23	T. J. Lang	6 ft 7 in (2.01 m)	200 lb (91 kg)	Jr	McGill Toolen	Mobile, AL
F	24	Anfernee McLemore	6 ft 7 in (2.01 m)	210 lb (95 kg)	Fr	Worth County	Warwick, GA
G	25	Mike Cohen (W)	5 ft 10 in (1.78 m)	175 lb (79 kg)	Fr	Bishop Eustance	Voorhees, NJ
F	31	Devin Waddell	6 ft 5 in (1.96 m)	225 lb (102 kg)	Sr	Hargrave Military Academy	Summerfield, NC
G	35	Ronnie Johnson	6 ft 0 in (1.83 m)	180 lb (82 kg)	RS Sr	North Central; Houston	Indianapolis, IN
C	41	Cole Blackstock (W)	6 ft 9 in (2.06 m)	253 lb (115 kg)	So	Brooks	Killen, AL
C	50	Austin Wiley	6 ft 11 in (2.11 m)	255 lb (116 kg)	Fr	Spain Park	Hoover, AL
F	52	Trey Tate (W)	6 ft 6 in (1.98 m)	230 lb (104 kg)	So	Rehobeth	Dothan, AL

Head coach

- Bruce Pearl (Boston College)

Assistant coach(es)

- Chuck Person (Auburn)
- Harris Adler (Rowan)
- Chad Dollar (Milligan)

Legend

- (C) Team captain
- (S) Suspended
- (I) Ineligible
- (W) Walk-on
- Injured
- Current redshirt

Roster

== Schedule and results ==
Date time, TV	Rank^{#}	Opponent^{#}	Result	Record	High points	High rebounds	High assists	Site (attendance) city, state
Exhibition
11/04/2016*; 8:30 pm		Montevallo	W 96–68	–	26 – Heron	7 – Purifoy	3 – Spencer	Auburn Arena (8,187); Auburn, AL
Regular season
11/11/2016*; 8:30 pm, SECN+		North Florida	W 83–66	1–0	19 – Brown	7 – Smith	4 – Dunans	Auburn Arena (8,093); Auburn, AL
11/14/2016*; 8:00 pm, SECN		Georgia State; Cancún Challenge	W 83–65	2–0	19 – Purifoy	8 – Heron	5 – Johnson	Auburn Arena (6,980); Auburn, AL
11/17/2016*; 8:00 pm, SECN		Eastern Kentucky; Cancún Challenge	W 85–64	3–0	24 – Heron	10 – Heron	4 – Johnson	Auburn Arena (6,987); Auburn, AL
11/22/2016*; 5:00 pm, CBSSN		vs. Texas Tech; Cancún Challenge semifinals	W 67–65	4–0	15 – Heron	6 – Purifoy	5 – Purifoy	Hard Rock Hotel Riviera Maya (1,610); Cancún, Mexico
11/23/2016*; 7:30 pm, CBSSN		vs. No. 17 Purdue; Cancún Challenge Championship	L 71–96	4–1	22 – Purifoy	8 – Heron	4 – Dunans	Hard Rock Hotel Riviera Maya (1,610); Cancún, Mexico
11/29/2016*; 7:00 pm, SECN+		USC Upstate	W 90–83	5–1	23 – Heron	6 – Heron	9 – Purifoy	Auburn Arena (6,504); Auburn, AL
12/03/2016*; 7:30 pm, beIN		at UAB; Rivalry	W 74–70	6–1	21 – Harper	7 – Heron	3 – Harper	Bartow Arena (8,728); Birmingham, AL
12/12/2016*; 6:00 pm, FS1		vs. Boston College; Under Armour Reunion	L 71–72	6–2	27 – Purifoy	7 – Heron	3 – Harper	Madison Square Garden (7,558); New York City, NY
12/15/2016*; 8:00 pm, SECN		Coastal Carolina	W 117–72	7–2	27 – Purifoy	8 – McLemore	7 – Harper	Auburn Arena (7,333); Auburn, AL
12/18/2016*; 12:00 pm, SECN		Mercer	W 76–74	8–2	21 – Heron	6 – Purifoy	5 – Johnson	Auburn Arena (7,991); Auburn, AL
12/21/2016*; 7:30 pm, CBSSN		vs. Oklahoma; Basketball Hall of Fame's Birthday of Basketball	W 74–70	9–2	21 – Tied	12 – Heron	5 – Dunans	Mohegan Sun Arena (3,462); Uncasville, CT
12/23/2016*; 1:30 pm, ESPN2		at UConn	W 70–67 ^{OT}	10–2	22 – Harper	15 – Purifoy	5 – Harper	XL Center (12,051); Hartford, CT
12/29/2016; 6:00 pm, ESPNU		Georgia	L 84–96	10–3 (0–1)	19 – Heron	7 – McLemore	6 – Harper	Auburn Arena (9,121); Auburn, AL
01/04/2017; 6:00 pm, SECN		at Vanderbilt	L 61–80	10–4 (0–2)	19 – Harper	6 – Tied	3 – Purifoy	Memorial Gymnasium (9,918); Nashville, TN
01/07/2017; 5:00 pm, SECN		Ole Miss	L 85–88	10–5 (0–3)	24 – Harper	9 – Wiley	3 – Johnson	Auburn Arena (9,121); Auburn, AL
01/10/2017; 6:00 pm, SECN		at Missouri	W 77–72	11–5 (1–3)	16 – Heron	9 – Heron	4 – Johnson	Mizzou Arena (9,688); Columbia, MO
01/14/2017; 3:00 pm, ESPN		at No. 6 Kentucky	L 72−92	11−6 (1−4)	23 – Dunans	3 – Tied	3 – Johnson	Rupp Arena (24,372); Lexington, KY
01/18/2017; 7:30 pm, SECN		LSU	W 78−74	12−6 (2−4)	12 – Tied	7 – Spencer	3 – Dunans	Auburn Arena (8,327); Auburn, AL
01/21/2017; 3:00 pm, ESPN2		Alabama; Rivalry	W 84–64	13−6 (3−4)	19 – Wiley	9 – Wiley	3 – Harper	Auburn Arena (9,121); Auburn, AL
01/24/2017; 5:30 pm, SECN		at No. 23 South Carolina	L 69−98	13−7 (3−5)	18 – McLemore	11 – Wiley	3 – Dunans	Colonial Life Arena (14,356); Columbia, SC
01/28/2017*; 5:00 pm, ESPNU		at TCU; Big 12/SEC Challenge	W 88−80	14−7	25 – Wiley	7 – Dunans	7 – Dunans	Schollmaier Arena (6,874); Fort Worth, TX
01/31/2017; 8:00 pm, SECN		Tennessee	L 77–87	14–8 (3−6)	21 – Harper	11 – McLemore	2 – Tied	Auburn Arena (7,525); Auburn, AL
02/04/2017; 7:30 pm, SECN		at Alabama; Rivalry	W 82–77	15−8 (4−6)	15 – Johnson	8 – McLemore	3 – Brown	Coleman Coliseum (15,383); Tuscaloosa, AL
02/07/2017; 8:00 pm, ESPNU		Mississippi State	W 98−92	16−8 (5−6)	18 – Brown	6 – Dunans	8 – Johnson	Auburn Arena (7,050); Auburn, AL
02/11/2017; 5:00 pm, SECN		at Ole Miss	L 84−90	16−9 (5−7)	18 – Johnson	8 – McLemore	8 – Johnson	The Pavilion at Ole Miss (8,280); Oxford, MS
02/14/2017; 6:00 pm, SECN		No. 15 Florida	L 95−114	16−10 (5−8)	19 – McLemore	6 – Tied	5 – Brown	Auburn Arena (7,572); Auburn, AL
02/18/2017; 3:00 pm, ESPNU		at Texas A&M	L 62–81	16–11 (5–9)	20 – Heron	5 – Heron	4 – Harper	Reed Arena (9,377); College Station, TX
02/21/2017; 6:00 pm, SECN		at LSU	W 98−75	17−11 (6−9)	17 – Johnson	9 – Heron	3 – Dunans	Pete Maravich Assembly Center (6,638); Baton Rouge, LA
02/25/2017; 7:30 pm, SECN		Arkansas	L 68−79	17−12 (6−10)	17 – Harper	8 – McLemore	3 – Harper	Auburn Arena (8,098); Auburn, AL
03/01/2017; 5:30 pm, SECN		at Georgia	L 78−79	17−13 (6−11)	15 – Brown	9 – Heron	6 – Harper	Stegeman Coliseum (7,145); Athens, GA
03/04/2017; 2:30 pm, SECN		Missouri	W 89−78	18−13 (7−11)	20 – Heron	6 – McLemore	3 – Harper	Auburn Arena (7,659); Auburn, AL
SEC Tournament
03/08/2017; 8:30 pm, SECN	(11)	vs. (14) Missouri; First Round	L 83−86 ^{OT}	18−14	15 – Heron	14 – Heron	7 – Harper	Bridgestone Arena (8,567); Nashville, TN
*Non-conference game. ^{#}Rankings from AP Poll. (#) Tournament seedings in parentheses. All times are in Central Time. Source.
