= Lovely Hoffman =

American singer-songwriter

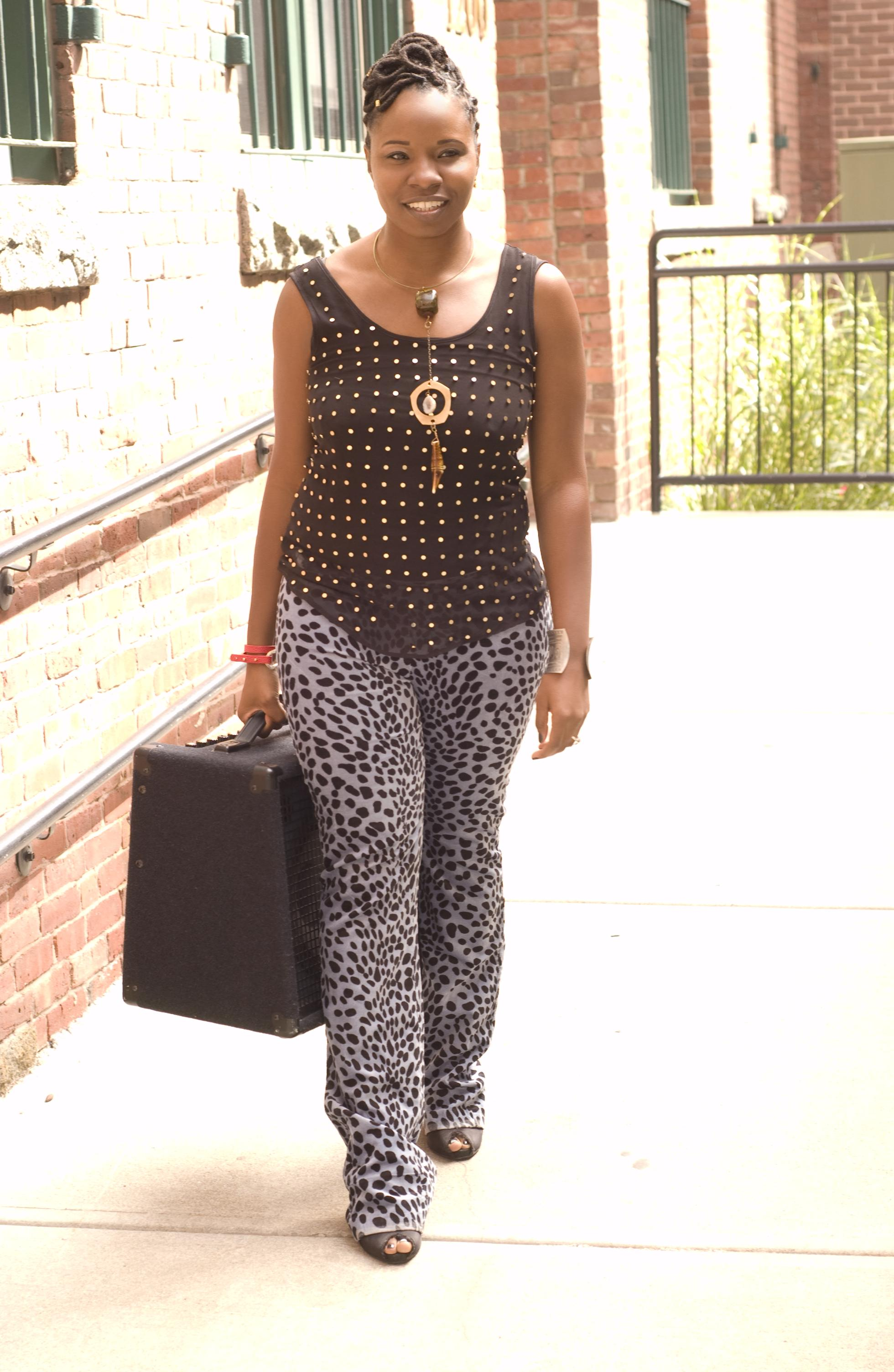
- Born: Boston, Massachusetts, US
- Education: Boston College
- Occupations: Singer-songwriter, musical theatre performer, music producer, stage actress
- Musical career
- Genres: contemporary R&B, gospel music, dance
- Instruments: Vocals, piano
- Years active: 2003–present
- Label: 100 Decibels Music Group
- Website: www.lovelyhoffman.com

Lovely Hoffman is an American recording artist, musical theater performer, record producer, musician, actress and educator. She is best known for her 2017 breakout single "My Black Is Beautiful", a song she wrote to address low self-esteem among young girls of color. In 2010, Lovely established herself in the theatre arts world when she was cast to co-star alongside Broadway star Marissa Perry in a production of Hairspray the musical, which was directed by Todd Michel Smith and Judine Somerville both cast members of the original Broadway production. She received notable recognition in 2007 when her debut single, "Can't Wait" peaked #10 on the urban college radio charts. Lovely has also performed and shared the stage with other notable R&B artists including Grammy Award-winning singer and songwriter Ne-Yo and multi-platinum recording artist and producer T-Pain.

== Early life and education ==
Hoffman was born in Roxbury, Massachusetts, a neighborhood of Boston. Her father is a pastor and she grew up singing in her father’s church. Growing up, she struggled with self-esteem and credits Brandy Norwood as one of her influences and inspiration for helping overcome some of her insecurities. Hoffman attended Boston College for both her undergraduate and graduate studies. She majored in Political Science, Communications, and minored in Music. She received her Masters in Education.

== Theatre ==
In September 2013, Hoffman was cast in the lead role of Celie for a New England production of The Color Purple, a role which Whoopi Goldberg originally portrayed in the Steven Spielberg directed film based on the 1982 Pulitzer Prize-winning novel by Alice Walker. Produced by Speakeasy Stage Company, the show opened January 10, 2014 as a Boston premiere. Lovely received an IRNE Award for best actress in a musical for her performance. In October 2019, Lovely starred as Sister Rosetta Tharpe, who is often referred to as the "Godmother of Rock & Roll," in the Greater Boston Stage Company production of Marie and Rosetta, a play with music written by George Brant, that chronicles the legendary American gospel singer and guitarist’s time with her protegee, Marie Knight, who together, rose to become a great gospel duo.

== Music ==
As a former middle-school history teacher, Hoffman noticed that young black girls were self-conscious about their appearance and as a result lacked confidence, which correlated to their academic achievement. She wrote a song "My Black Is Beautiful," to address low self-esteem issues among teenage girls of color. The song achieved wide popularity and gained significant public media attention for challenging beauty standards and empowering young school-aged girls of color with confidence in order to improve their performance in school. Hoffman explained why she wrote the song and its cultural significance with CNN on National Teacher Day on May 9, 2017. The single was released in February, 2017, and rose to #45 on the Urban Adult Contemporary radio charts, making it Hoffman’s first release to gain mainstream success. The music video went viral after being featured and shared online by several publications and media outlets.

== Theatre performance ==
Year	Title	Role	Producer	Notes
2019	Marie and Rosetta	Rosetta Tharpe	Greater Boston Stage Company	Cast in lead role
2019	Caroline, or Change	Radio 3	Moonbox Productions	
2019	Little Shop of Horrors	Crystal	Lyric Stage Company of Boston	Version: Broadway Revival
2013	The Color Purple	Celie	SpeakEasy Stage Company	Cast in lead role – Celie; New England regional premiere
2012	Little Shop of Horrors	Crystal	New Repertory Theatre	Played the role of Crystal; one third of the Street Urchins girl trio
2011	Ain't Misbehavin	Nell Carter	Lyric Stage Company of Boston	Played the role "Nell Carter" played in the Original Broadway Cast
2011	Ragtime	Sara's Friend	Emerson Umbrella	
2011	Sunfish	Storyteller	Stoneham Theatre	
2010	Hairspray	Dynamite	Reagle Music Theatre	Understudy: Motormouth Maybelle
2010	Ain't Misbehavin	Armelia McQueen	Lexington Players	
2009	Hair	Dionne	Winthrop Players	
2009	Our Story	Various Characters	Origination	
2007	Ntune	Ensemble	Quannapowitt Players	

== Singles ==
Year	Single	Chart positions	Radio	Release
Year	Single	US	Radio	Release
2007	"Can't Wait"	10	Urban Radio Mixshow	iTunes, CD single
2009	"Light Switch"	—	Urban & Dance Radio Mixshow	iTunes, CD single
2010	"Twista "Wetter" Remix"	—	Urban Radio Mixshow	mixtape
2017	"My Black is Beautiful"	45	Urban AC	iTunes, streaming
