= Mustapha Heron =

American basketball player (born 1997)

No. 1 – Palencia Baloncesto
- Position: Shooting guard
- League: Primera FEB

Personal information
- Born: December 12, 1997 (age 28) Derby, Connecticut, U.S.
- Listed height: 6 ft 5 in (1.96 m)
- Listed weight: 205 lb (93 kg)

Career information
- High school: Wilbraham & Monson Academy (Wilbraham, Massachusetts); Sacred Heart (Waterbury, Connecticut)
- College: Auburn (2016–2018); St. John's (2018–2020)
- NBA draft: 2020: undrafted
- Playing career: 2021–present

Career history
- 2021: Leicester Riders
- 2021: ZTE KK
- 2022: Keflavík
- 2022–2023: Rio Grande Valley Vipers
- 2023–2024: Manawatu Jets
- 2023: Al-Rayyan
- 2024: Goes
- 2024: Abejas de León
- 2025: Þór Þorlákshöfn
- 2025: Wilki Morskie Szczecin
- 2025–2026: Melilla Ciudad del Deporte
- 2026–present: Palencia

Career highlights
- Second-team All-SEC – AP (2018); SEC All-Freshman team (2017); 2× Connecticut Player of the Year (2015, 2016)
Medals
Representing the United States
Pan American Games
Bronze medal – third place	2019 Lima	National team

Mustapha Jahhad Heron (born December 12, 1997) is an American professional basketball player for Palencia of the Spanish Primera FEB. He played college basketball for the Auburn Tigers and the St. John's Red Storm.

== Early life ==
Mustapha Heron was born on December 12, 1997, in Derby, Connecticut, to parents Thalia Levey and Bryan Heron. He started playing basketball at the age of three. He has three sisters and one brother: Imani, Zari, Aja, and Raheem. Heron gained fame as an eighth grader after a video of him guarding NBA all-star Chris Paul one-on-one at the Five-Star Skills Clinic was posted to YouTube in 2011. The video has since been viewed over 2 million times.

== High school career ==
Heron played his freshman year of high school at Wilbraham & Monson Academy before transferring to Sacred Heart High School, where he won three consecutive Connecticut state championships. He averaged 22.0 points per game and 5.3 rebounds per game as a junior at Sacred Heart, and 30.2 points per game and 8.0 rebounds per game during his senior season, including scoring 79 total points in the state semifinals and championship game. Heron was selected as the New Haven Register Connecticut Boys Basketball Player of the Year in both 2015 and 2016, becoming the first player to win the award twice since Kris Dunn. He was also recognized nationally, earning a spot on the USA Today All-USA Boys Basketball Third team in 2016. Heron was selected to play in the 2016 Ballislife All-American Game, where he was named co-MVP alongside Lonzo Ball.

=== Recruiting ===
Despite being initially committed to Pittsburgh, Heron committed to play basketball at Auburn University on August 16, 2015, and signed his National Letter of Intent to attend the university on November 12, 2015. In doing so, Heron became the first five-star men's basketball recruit to play at Auburn in program history.

College recruiting
Name	Hometown	School	Height	Weight	Commit date
Mustapha Heron; SG	Waterbury, CT	Sacred Heart (CT)	6 ft 5 in (1.96 m)	200 lb (91 kg)	Aug 16, 2015
Mustapha Heron; SG	Recruit ratings: Scout: Rivals: 247Sports: ESPN: (92)				
Overall recruit ranking: Scout: 25 Rivals: 19 247Sports: 28 ESPN: 25
Note: In many cases, Scout, Rivals, 247Sports, On3, and ESPN may conflict in their listings of height and weight.; In these cases, the average was taken. ESPN grades are on a 100-point scale.; Sources: "Auburn 2016 Basketball Commitments". Rivals.; "2016 Auburn Tigers Recruiting Class". ESPN.; "2016 Team Ranking". Rivals.

== College career ==
In his first season at Auburn, Heron scored in double figures in every game but one, leading the team in scoring with 15.2 points per game and rebounding with 6.1 rebounds per game. At the end of the season, he was named to the SEC All-Freshman team. He was also named to the SEC All-Community Service team for his work in encouraging academics for athletes at his high school, Sacred Heart High School, and in promoting a weapons buy-back program in his hometown of Waterbury, Connecticut.

Heron was selected as the SEC Men's Basketball Player of the Week for weeks 9 and 12 during his second season at Auburn. At the end of the regular season, Heron was selected to the AP All-SEC Second team. He averaged 16.4 points and 5.3 rebounds per game as a sophomore. On April 4, 2018, Heron declared for the 2018 NBA draft but did not hire an agent in order to maintain his amateur status. He announced that he was withdrawing from the draft but will transfer to be closer to his ailing mother in Connecticut. On May 31, Heron announced that he was transferring to St. John's and intended to seek a hardship waiver to play immediately. He was granted the waiver on October 13.

Heron averaged 14.6 points per game as a junior, shooting 40.3 percent from beyond the arc. He helped lead St. John's to its first NCAA Tournament since 2015. On February 11, 2020, Heron was ruled likely out for the season with an ankle injury.

== Professional career ==
On February 26, 2021, Heron signed with the Leicester Riders of the British Basketball League for the rest of the 2020–21 season. In 20 games, he averaged 11.5 points, 4.2 rebounds and 1.1 assists per game.

For the 2021–22 season, Heron moved to Hungary to play for ZTE KK. In five games between September 25 and October 16, he averaged 9.2 points, 2.8 rebounds and 1.2 assists per game. In February 2022, he moved to Iceland to play for Keflavík. In 12 games, he averaged 16.4 points, 5.3 rebounds, 2.2 assists and 1.2 steals per game.

In October 2022, Heron joined the Rio Grande Valley Vipers of the NBA G League.

On March 1, 2023, Heron signed with the Manawatu Jets for the 2023 New Zealand NBL season.

Heron started the 2023–24 season with Al-Rayyan of the Qatari Basketball League before joining Club Atlético Goes of the Liga Uruguaya de Básquetbol in January 2024. He then re-joined the Manawatu Jets for the 2024 New Zealand NBL season.

On March 29, 2025, he signed with Wilki Morskie Szczecin of the Polish Basketball League (PLK). After signing for Club Melilla Baloncesto of the Primera FEB in 2025, he left the club in February 2026. On February 5, 2026, he signed a short-term contract with Palencia of the Primera FEB.

== National team career ==
In the summer of 2019, Heron was a part of the United States National team who competed at the Pan American Games in Peru. The team won bronze.

== Career statistics ==
Legend
GP	Games played	GS	Games started	MPG	Minutes per game
FG%	Field goal percentage	3P%	3-point field goal percentage	FT%	Free throw percentage
RPG	Rebounds per game	APG	Assists per game	SPG	Steals per game
BPG	Blocks per game	PPG	Points per game	**Bold**	Career high

=== College ===
Year	Team	GP	GS	MPG	FG%	3P%	FT%	RPG	APG	SPG	BPG	PPG
2016–17	Auburn	**32**	**32**	28.2	**.442**	**.423**	.770	**6.1**	1.3	.8	.2	15.2
2017–18	Auburn	**32**	**32**	28.6	.439	.331	.803	5.3	.9	**1.2**	.1	**16.4**
2018–19	St. John's	31	30	**31.7**	.440	.403	.754	4.6	1.3	1.1	.2	14.6
2019–20	St. John's	21	19	24.8	.385	.385	**.827**	2.4	**1.6**	.5	**.3**	13.8
Career		116	113	28.6	.430	.383	.785	4.8	1.3	.9	.2	15.1
