= Harrison Fitch =

American basketball player (c. 1912–1984)

- Fitch in 1934

Personal information
- Born: circa 1912 New Haven, Connecticut, U.S.
- Died: June 11, 1984 (aged 72) Wallingford, Connecticut, U.S.
- Listed height: 6 ft 0 in (1.83 m)
- Listed weight: 190 lb (86 kg)

Career information
- High school: Hillhouse (New Haven, Connecticut)
- College: UConn (1933–1934); American International

Harrison Brooks "Honey" Fitch (c. 1912 – June 11, 1984) was an African American college basketball player who played for the University of Connecticut (UConn). He was targeted in a racist incident at a scheduled game between UConn and the United States Coast Guard Academy on January 27, 1934.

== Biography ==
Fitch was born in New Haven to Connecticut-born parents Collins and Lulu Fitch. His father was a United States Postal Service mail carrier, and his mother was a homemaker. The family had seven sons, including Fitch, and one daughter. Fitch was a star basketball player at Hillhouse High School before enrolling in Connecticut State College (now the University of Connecticut) as a freshman in the fall of 1932.

Fitch played guard in basketball, first baseman in baseball, and end in football. As well as being Connecticut State College's only African American student and its first African American basketball player, Fitch's sportsmanship, geniality, and dignity quickly made him one of its most popular students. The student body voted him best athlete in April 1933. Fitch was nicknamed "Honey" due to his smooth play.

Despite his popularity at UConn, Fitch regularly faced racist abuse from opposing players, coaches, and fans. Of fourteen collegiate rivals, only teams and fans from the University of New Hampshire and Brown University applauded Fitch and refrained from racist taunts and other harassment. Incidents of racism culminated during a headline-grabbing January 1934 game against the US Coast Guard Academy. At the end of the 1934 spring semester, facing fiscal constraints and in the aftermath of the incident, Fitch transferred to the American International College in Springfield, Massachusetts.

After graduating from American International College, where he played basketball, Fitch went on to play football for the Boston Shamrocks. In 1938 he signed with the Walcos in Wallingford. Later in life, he became a researcher at Monsanto. He worked with youth groups and refereed basketball in western Massachusetts. He married Hazel Brandrum in 1939 and they had two sons: Harrison Brooks Fitch Jr. and Charles. Brooks followed in his father's footsteps, receiving his bachelor's degree from UConn in 1964. Fitch was a 32nd degree Mason and died on June 11, 1984, at the age of 72 in Wallingford, Connecticut. He is buried at Oak Grove Cemetery in Springfield, Massachusetts.

In 2022, Fitch was posthumously inducted into the Huskies of Honor, a UConn program that recognizes top coaches and players in the university's basketball history.

== Racist incident ==
On Saturday, January 27, 1934, the Connecticut State men's basketball team was scheduled to play the US Coast Guard Academy team in New London. Earlier that same day, the academy had barred a University of New Hampshire athlete, Fred Moody, from boxing matches because Moody was African American. Around half of the academy's all-white cadets were from the racially segregated South. Coast Guard officials claimed that their athletes had never played a racially integrated team and "there had been a long tradition that no 'negro' players be allowed to engage in contests at the Academy".

The Connecticut State players, including Fitch, traveled to New London, changed into their uniforms, and began practicing on the court. Just before game time, however, Coast Guard officials refused to play Connecticut State if Fitch participated in the game. The game was delayed for an hour while officials and players from the rival teams argued. The New Hampshire boxing coach entered the locker rooms to encourage Connecticut to put Fitch on the field, rejecting the Coast Guard's claim that New Hampshire would take offense if Fitch were allowed to compete after Moody had been excluded. Eventually, the game went ahead but Connecticut State coach John Heldman Jr. kept Fitch on the bench without explanation. Connecticut State won a hard-fought contest 31–29.

The following day, athletic directors Roy J. Guyer (Connecticut State) and Lt. John S. Merriman (Coast Guard) met in Willimantic to adjudicate the previous night's events. They quickly issued a joint statement blaming the incident on a "very unfortunate misunderstanding" that had been "satisfactorily adjusted." The statement concluded that thereafter "any student at either institution will be eligible to participate in various athletic activities scheduled between the two schools." Nominally, this meant that Fitch could participate in future games against the Coast Guard Academy.

Connecticut State students rallied in support of Fitch. The Connecticut Campus sports editor called for rival teams to commit to allowing Fitch to play without regard to his race. In early March, basketball captain Connie Donahue, who would later be a longtime coach at Torrington High School, led a student senate committee to survey students on the state of athletics. The student body voted 169–7 to fire Heldman, who resigned a year later after four consecutive losing seasons, and 112–50 to fire Guyer, who remained athletic director until 1936. Students also voted Fitch the outstanding athlete on campus for the second year in a row. Students widely decried Connecticut State's response as inadequate. The Coast Guard Academy never apologized.

The controversy made state and national headlines. Oscar S. De Priest, the only African-American member of Congress at the time, publicly condemned the exclusion of Moody and Fitch as "un-American". Albert Keane, sports editor for the Hartford Courant, rebuked the Coast Guard Academy but considered the controversy overblown.
