= Michael Mallory (basketball) =

American basketball player (born 1994)

Personal information
- Born: February 8, 1994 (age 32) Waterbury, Connecticut, U.S.
- Listed height: 6 ft 2 in (1.88 m)
- Listed weight: 185 lb (84 kg)

Career information
- High school: Holy Cross (Waterbury, Connecticut); Marianapolis Preparatory School (Thompson, Connecticut)
- College: Southern Connecticut (2013–2017)
- NBA draft: 2017: undrafted
- Playing career: 2017–present
- Position: Point guard

Career history
- 2017: HKK Zrinjski Mostar
- 2017–2018: Blokotehna
- 2018–2019: Bosna Royal
- 2019–2020: Novi Pazar
- 2021: Höttur
- 2021–2022: Anorthosis Ammohostou
- 2022: KR

Michael Anthony Mallory II (born February 8, 1994) is an American professional basketball player. He played college basketball at Southern Connecticut State University from 2013 to 2017.

== College career ==
Mallory played for Southern Connecticut from 2013 to 2017. In 2016-17, Michael scored 720 points, 138 rebounds, 120 assists, 40 blocks and 32 steals.

In 2015-16, 662 points, 125 rebounds, 131 assists, 16 blocks, and 31 steals.

In 2014-15, 584 points, 127 rebounds, 48 assists, 24 blocks, and 55 steals.

In 2013-14, 522 points, 137 rebounds, 51 assists, 33 blocks and 29 steals.

Throughout Michael's years at Southern Connecticut he achieved numerous accomplishments including, 2016-17 Sporting News preseason All-American, 2015-16 Division II Bulletin All-American, 2015-16 All-Region (NABC and D2CCCA) pick, 2015-16 All-ECAC selection, 2015-16 First-Team All-Northeast-10 Conference Selection, 2015-16 Sporting News prepreseason All-American, 2015-16 Basketball Times preseason All-American, 2014-15 All-Northeast-10 Conference selection, 2014 Division II Bulletin All-Freshman team member, 2013-14 Northeast-10 Conference Rookie of the Year, 2014 All-Northeast-10 Conference Tournament team pick.

Mallory holds the record for all-time leading scorer for both the NE-10 Conference and SCSU with 2,515 points. Along with holding this record, Michael holds 10 individual records at Southern Connecticut State University. In a single season Michael had most points scored (720; 2016–17), 3-point field goals made (95; 2015–16), and 3-point field goals attempted (274; 2015–16)

For individual career records Michael holds most points (2,515), Field goals made (882), Field goals attempted (2,035), 3-point field goals made (347), 3-point field goals attempted (934) and games played (125).

Michael also holds the record for single game highs of 47 points vs. Bentley (1/30/16), 43 points vs. American International (11/24/15), and 40 points vs. St. Michael's (1/4/17).

== Professional career ==
After graduating, on August 3, 2017, Mallory signed with HKK Zrinjski Mostar of Bosnian League, but after two weeks, he part ways with the Bosnian club. On October 5, 2017, he signed with Macedonian basketball club Blokotehna. He made his debut for the Blokotehna in their season opener on October 8, 2017, scoring 2 points and three rebounds in a 99–56 win over the Kožuv. On his debut in BIBL against Tirana he scored 6 points, 3 rebounds and 1 assist. On the start of 2018 he got injured on the knee, so he had to miss the rest of the season.

In January 2021, Mallory signed with Höttur of the Icelandic Úrvalsdeild karla.

For the 2021-22 season Mallory signed with Anorthosis Ammohostou that plays in the top league in Cyprus, the Cyprus OPAP League.

In August 2022, Mallory returned to Iceland and signed with KR.
