= Tyrn Flowers =

American basketball player

Personal information
- Born: January 17, 1998 (age 28) Waterbury, Connecticut, U.S.
- Listed height: 6 ft 9 in (2.06 m)
- Listed weight: 200 lb (91 kg)

Career information
- High school: Sacred Heart (Waterbury, Connecticut)
- College: UMass (2016–2017); LIU (2018–2022)
- NBA draft: 2022: undrafted
- Playing career: 2022–present
- Position: Power forward / center

Career history
- 2022: Ontario Clippers
- 2023: Sheffield Sharks
- 2023: Svendborg Rabbits
- 2023–2026: AEL Limassol
- 2026-: Keravnos B.C.

Career highlights
- First-team All-NEC (2022); 2× Second-team All-NEC (2020, 2021); Third-team All-NEC (2019)

Tyrn Bryan Flowers (born January 17, 1998) is an American professional basketball player. He played college basketball for the Long Island University.

== Early life and high school ==
Flowers attended Sacred Heart High School in Waterbury, Connecticut, where he was a 3-star recruit according to ESPN and 247Sports. He was number 4 in his recruiting class in Connecticut, number 45 small forward, number 54 in the Northeast region. He played AAU for NY RENS basketball.

In April 2016, Flowers committed to University of Massachusetts Amherst He chose them over Boston College, Maryland, and Providence College.

== College career ==
=== University of Massachusetts Amherst (2016–2017) ===
As a freshman at University of Massachusetts Amherst, he made 33 appearances and started five games. He averaged 4.5 points and 2.6 rebounds per game.

=== Long Island University (2018–2022) ===
Flowers transferred to Long Island University (LIU) and sat out the season due to NCAA transfer rules.

During the 2018–2019 season, Flowers was third-team All-NEC. He started all 32 games. He set new career highs in every single category including points, rebounds, assists, and blocks. He finished the year with 13.7 points per game.

During the 2019–2020 season, Flowers was second-team All-NEC. He appeared in 33 games and started in 32. He averaged 14.3 points, 9.6 rebounds and 2 assists per game. He led the team in rebounds and second in scoring.

On February 8, 2020, Flowers scored 25 points and grabbed 27 rebounds in a game, breaking the single-game rebound record of 26 set by Carey Scurry in 1983.

During the 2020–2021 season, he started every game and averaged 17.3 points, 8.4 rebounds and 3.5 assists per game. He scored in double figures in all but one game.

During the 2021–2022 season, Flowers was First Team All-NEC and NABC Division I All-District. He started in 29 games. He averaged 19.2 points, 7.8 rebounds and 3.2 assists per game. Flowers led the team in scoring, rebounds, three-point percentage, and free throw percentage.

On April 27, 2022, Flowers was named the Male Athlete of the Year at the 2022 LIU Athletic Awards.

== Professional career ==
=== Wisconsin Herd (2022) ===
Flowers was drafted by the Wisconsin Herd in the first round as the 23rd pick. On October 28, 2022, his contract was placed on waivers.

=== Ontario Clippers (2022) ===
On November 27, 2022, the Ontario Clippers claimed Flowers from the player pool. On December 6, 2022, the Clippers placed his contract on waivers.

=== Sheffield Sharks (2023) ===
In January 2023, Flowers signed with the Sheffield Sharks of the Super League Basketball.

=== Svendborg Rabbits (2023) ===
On August 22, 2023, Flowers signed a two-year deal with Svendborg Rabbits of the Basketligaen. However, Rabbits management terminated the contract on November 2, 2023, due to what was termed unprofessional behavior. He had played seven games with the Rabbits.

=== AEL Limassol (2023–2025) ===
On November 20, 2023, Flowers signed with AEL Limassol B.C. On August 17, 2024, he signed a two-year contract renewal.

On October 22, 2024, Flowers received a Hoops Agents Player of the Week award for Round 2. He had 33 points and 8 rebounds. On December 11, 2024, Flowers received a Hoops Agents Player of the Week award for Round 7. He had a double-double of 40 points and 12 rebounds. On December 23, 2024, Flowers received a Hoops Agents Player of the Week award for Round 10. He had a double-double of 31 points and 21 rebounds.
