= Tony Hanson =

American basketball player (1955–2018)

- Hanson in 2012

Personal information
- Born: October 20, 1955 Kingston, Jamaica
- Died: November 25, 2018 (aged 63) Windham, Connecticut, U.S.
- Listed height: 6 ft 5 in (1.96 m)
- Listed weight: 205 lb (93 kg)

Career information
- High school: Holy Cross (Waterbury, Connecticut)
- College: UConn (1973–1977)
- NBA draft: 1977: 3rd round, 50th overall pick
- Drafted by: New Orleans Jazz
- Position: Guard / forward
- Number: 42

Career highlights
- Husky of Honor (2007); ECAC Player of the Year (1977); New England Player of the Year (1977)
- Stats at Basketball Reference

Tony Hanson (October 20, 1955 – November 25, 2018) was an American basketball player. He was drafted by the New Orleans Jazz in the third round of the 1977 NBA draft.

== Collegiate playing career ==
After a standout high school career at Holy Cross High School, Hanson attended the University of Connecticut playing under legendary coach Dee Rowe. In his junior season, they won the ECAC New England Championship as he guided the team to a Sweet 16 appearance. He was also the Yankee Conference Rookie of the Year in 1974. The next two seasons saw Hanson in the All-Yankee Conference First Team pick, both in 1975 and 1976. It was his senior year that gained him recognition, his double-double average of 26.0 points per game and 10.6 rebounds per contest leading him to be named New England Player of the Year and ECAC Player of the Year. His time playing for the Huskies has led him to third in career scoring among all Connecticut basketball players (1,990 points in total), and first in field goals with 784. His average of 26.0 points per game places him second. Hanson was named to the UConn Basketball All-Century Team in 2001 as well as its Huskies of Honor in 2007.

=== College statistics ===
Year	Team	GP	GS	MPG	FG%	3P%	FT%	RPG	APG	SPG	BPG	PPG
1973–74	Connecticut	27	–	–	.458	–	.506	5.4	2.0	–	–	9.9
1974–75	Connecticut	28	–	–	.480	–	.681	6.5	2.2	–	–	16.7
1975–76	Connecticut	29	–	–	.494	–	.711	7.2	3.5	–	–	19.1
1976–77	Connecticut	27	–	–	.523	–	.757	10.5	3.0	–	–	26.0
Career		111	–	–	.494	–	.699	7.3	2.7	–	–	17.9

== 1977 NBA draft ==
Following four successful years with Huskies, Hanson was picked by New Orleans Jazz in the third round of the 1977 NBA draft. He played preseason but due to Injury he continued his career in Europe.

== European career ==
After failing to make the Utah Jazz roster, Hanson moved to Europe and played professionally in Italy, France, Northern Ireland, and England. In England, he later joined the Tees Valley Mohawks, where he became head coach following his retirement as a player. During his tenure, the team won multiple trophies and featured former University of Connecticut player E.J. Harrison, a member of the university's 1999 NCAA championship team.

== Post-retirement ==
After retiring from basketball, Hanson set up Hoop Dreams Social Enterprise, utilizing his degree in Special Education to run an initiative to help young people with education problems, using basketball to aid them. He was also chairperson of Middlesbrough Black & Minority Ethnic Network, championing under represented ethnic groups in the UK. His charitable work led to him being awarded an MBE in 2007. Then culture secretary Tessa Jowell, who presented with Hanson the award, said of him, "Thanks to Mr Hanson's tireless efforts, thousands of young people in Tees Valley have benefited from the opportunities created by the Hoop Dreams Social Enterprise."

He was chairman of Tees Valley Mohawks Basketball Club, who compete in the top tier of English basketball. He died of a suspected heart attack on November 25, 2018, in Windham, Connecticut.
