= Harry A. Gampel Pavilion =

Indoor arena for UConn athletics; home of Men’s and Women’s Basketball

M&T Bank Center at Harry A. Gampel Pavilion
- "The Basketball Capital of the World"
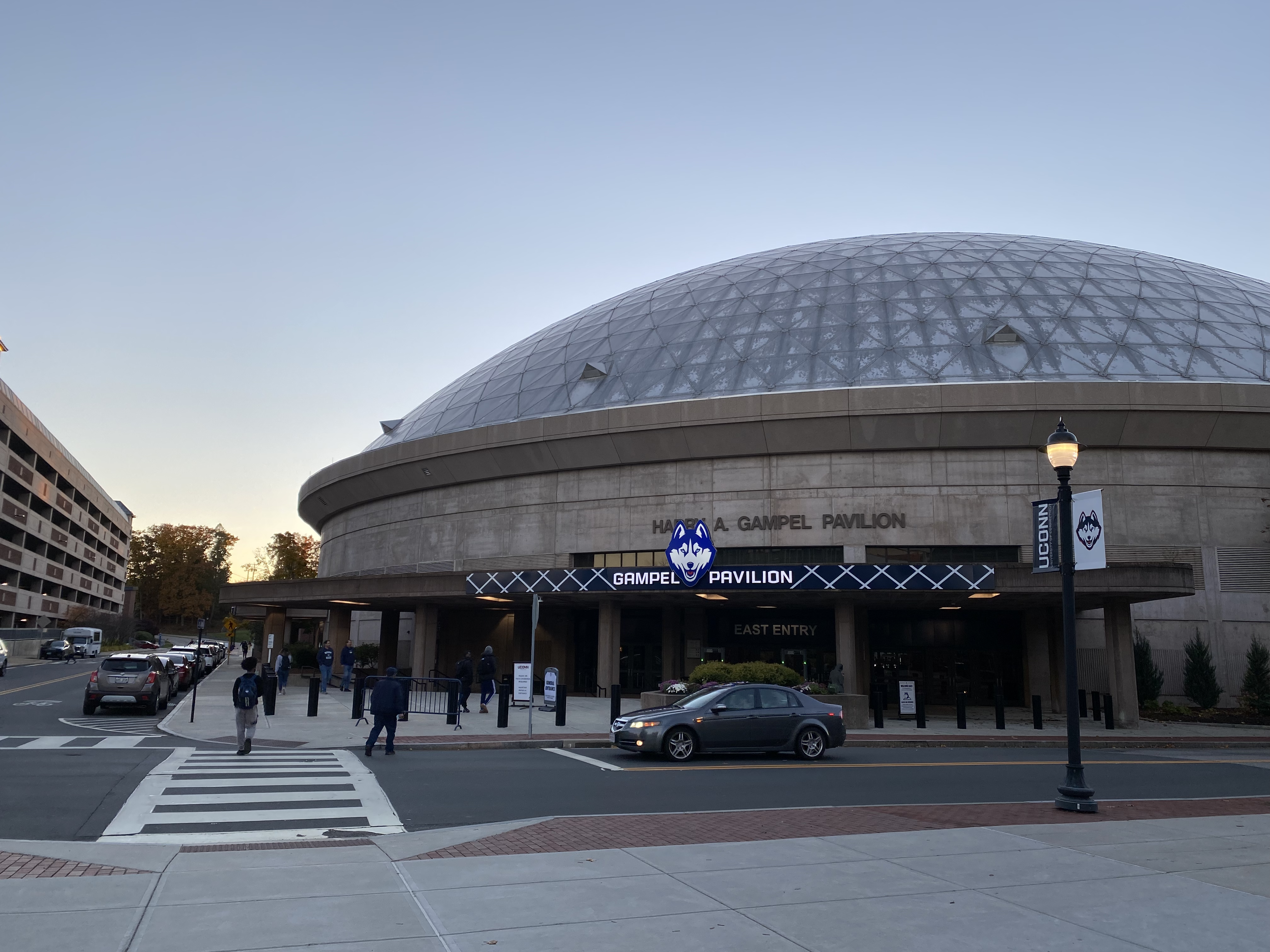
- Interactive map of M&T Bank Center at Harry A. Gampel Pavilion
- Location: 2095 Hillside Road; Storrs, Connecticut, United States 06269
- Coordinates: 41°48′19.05″N 72°15′15.10″W
- Owner: University of Connecticut
- Operator: University of Connecticut
- Capacity: 2025–present: 10,244; 2023–2025: 10,299; 2002–2023: 10,167; 1996–2002: 10,027; 1990–1996: 8,241
- Surface: 171,000 sq ft (15,900 m^{2})

Construction
- Groundbreaking: Summer, 1987
- Opened: January 21, 1990
- Expanded: Summer 1996
- Cost: $28 million ($69 million in 2025 dollars)
- Architect: The S/L/A/M Collaborative

Tenants
- UConn Huskies (NCAA); Men's basketball (1990–present); Women's basketball (1990–present); Women's volleyball (1990–2023)

M&T Bank Center at Harry A. Gampel Pavilion (more commonly known as Gampel Pavilion) is a 10,244-seat multi-purpose arena in Storrs, Connecticut, United States, on the campus of the University of Connecticut (UConn). The arena opened on January 21, 1990, and is the largest on-campus arena in New England. It was named after industrialist and 1943 UConn graduate Harry A. Gampel, a philanthropist who walked with Martin Luther King Jr., and who donated $1 million for the construction of the arena. It is about 216,000 sq ft (20,100 m^{2}). Gampel Pavilion is the primary home to the UConn Huskies men's basketball and women's basketball teams. It was formerly the home of the women's volleyball team.

Both the men's and women’s basketball teams also play at the PeoplesBank Arena in Hartford, playing roughly half the season in each venue. Separate season ticket packages are offered for each venue.

The pavilion is the centerpiece of the UConn Sports Center, which also includes Wolff-Zackin Natatorium.

On October 21, 2026, UConn Athletics announced they are partnering with M&T Bank for a historic naming deal. The Pavilion is now called M&T Bank Center at Gampel Pavilion.

== Construction ==
Gampel Pavilion replaced the Hugh S. Greer Field House, which still stands to the northwest of the pavilion but has a much smaller capacity (4,604). The facility has been expanded three times. As originally constructed, it seated 8,241. After the 1995–96 season, 1,900 seats were added around the entrances, increasing capacity to 10,027. A seating adjustment after the 2001–02 season added 140 more seats to result in the 10,167 capacity.

In the summer of 2017 a project began to replace the aging roof, which was completed in October 2017. During that time, the volleyball team played some of its fall home games in Greer Field House.

Minor renovations in 2023 and full renovation of the lower bowl in 2025 resulted in changes to the capacity.

== First game ==
The first basketball game was played on January 27, 1990, between the then 20th-ranked Huskies and the 15th-ranked St. John's Redmen (now Red Storm). UConn won 72–58.

== Home court advantage ==
From 1990 through 2026 the Huskies men's basketball team has a 239–45 record at Gampel Pavilion.

Year	Record
1989–1990	5–0
1990–1991	7–2
1991–1992	6–1
1992–1993	5–2
1993–1994	7–0
1994–1995	5–1
1995–1996	6–0
1996–1997	6–2
1997–1998	6–0
1998–1999	6–1
1999–2000	5–2
2000–2001	8–1
2001–2002	6–0
2002–2003	5–2
2003–2004	8–0
2004–2005	6–1
2005–2006	6–0
2006–2007	7–2
2007–2008	8–0
2008–2009	7–0
2009–2010	8–1
2010–2011	5–2
2011–2012	5–2
2012–2013	6–1
2013–2014	7–2
2014–2015	4–4
2015–2016	8–1
2016–2017	4–3
2017–2018	7–2
2018–2019	8–1
2019–2020	8–1
2020–2021	7–3
2021–2022	8–0
2022–2023	8–1
2023–2024	8–0
2024–2025	6–2
2025–2026	7–2

== International basketball games ==
Date	Opponent	Result	Home	Game Type	Attendance
November 5, 1995	United States	83–47	UConn Huskies	Exhibition	8,241
November 2, 2007	United States	90–74	UConn Huskies	Exhibition	-

== Banners ==
The banners for the men's and women's basketball teams have been taken down and in their place are now large boards on the walls listing the years the teams have made the NIT, NCAA Tournament, Sweet 16, and Elite 8, along with their Big East Regular Season and Tournament Championships. The National Championship Banners and NIT Championship Banners have been replaced with newer versions, along with banners commemorating Jim Calhoun and Geno Auriemma's Hall of Fame inductions.

Located throughout the concourse of Gampel Pavilion are plaques recognizing the Huskies of Honor, a recognition program that began in 2006 and honors the most significant figures in the history of the UConn basketball programs.

== See also ==
- List of NCAA Division I basketball arenas
