= Waterbury Catholic High School =

Coordinates: 41.5544°N 73.0371°W

- Waterbury, Connecticut; USA

Information
- Type: Secondary, Roman Catholic
- Grades: 09–12
- Enrollment: School was closed in 1975, was about 500 per year
- Campus: Urban
- Colors: Blue and white

Waterbury Catholic High School was a Catholic secondary school founded in 1926 in Waterbury, Connecticut by the Congregation of Notre Dame (CND) of Montreal, Quebec, Canada.

The CND infused the school with their strong interest in education, particularly as a vehicle to empower women. The school brought traditional college preparatory courses together with a strong curriculum of social justice, in the tradition of peace and justice studies. The study of Thomas Merton, Thich Nhat Hanh and other visionaries threaded through the curriculum. The brothers Daniel and Philip Berrigan, James Carroll, Doctor Spock and César Chávez all visited the school in the 1970s.

The school graduated about 120 young women per year. Kathleen P. Deignan taught there as a young nun, using her music to teach and animate students.

It closed in 1975 when it merged with the Holy Cross High School, an all-boys school. Sacred Heart High School bought the building.
