= Huskies of Honor =

Award given by the University of Connecticut

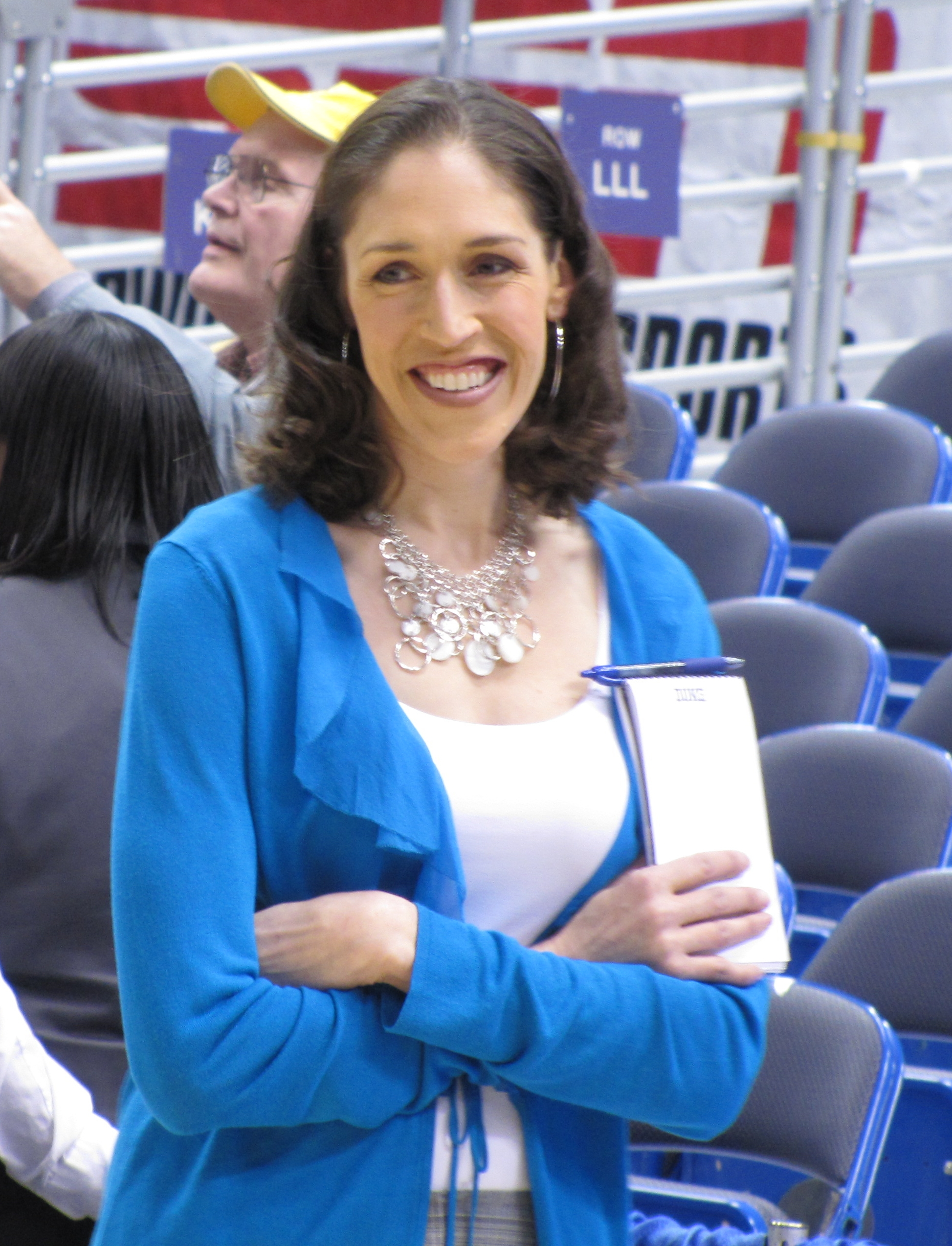
Rebecca Lobo, an inaugural inductee into the Huskies of Honor, was elected to the Naismith Memorial Basketball Hall of Fame in 2017.

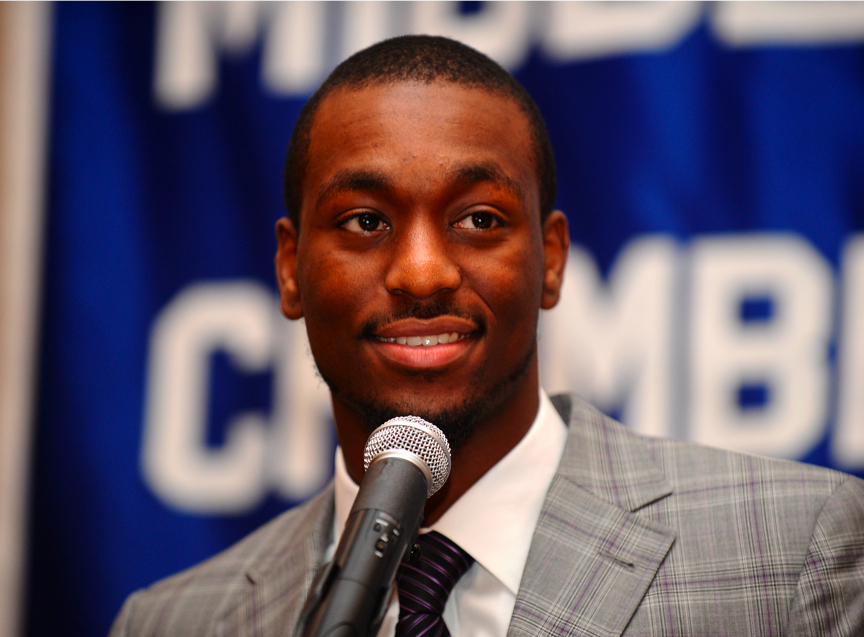
Kemba Walker was inducted into the Huskies of Honor in a surprise ceremony following the Connecticut Huskies men's basketball 2011 National Championship victory.

Huskies of Honor is a recognition program sponsored by the University of Connecticut (UConn). Similar to a hall of fame, it honors the most significant figures in the history of the UConn Huskies—the university's athletic teams—especially the men's and women's basketball teams. The inaugural honorees, inducted in two separate ceremonies during the 2006–07 season, included thirteen men's basketball players, ten women's basketball players, and four head coaches, of whom two coaches—Jim Calhoun and Geno Auriemma—and four players—Ray Allen, Sue Bird, Swin Cash and Rebecca Lobo—are also enshrined in the Naismith Basketball Hall of Fame. Since that time, an additional thirteen women's basketball players, eleven men's basketball players, nine national championship teams, one women's basketball assistant coach, and one athletic director have been honored. One of these later honorees, player Maya Moore, was inducted to the Hall of Fame alongside Bird in 2025.

Men's basketball has been played at the University of Connecticut since 1901, when the school was known as Connecticut Agricultural College. The Huskies first achieved success under Coach Hugh Greer, who over a sixteen-year period led the team to twelve Yankee Conference championships, seven National Collegiate Athletic Association (NCAA) Tournament berths, and one National Invitation Tournament appearance before dying suddenly during the 1962–63 college basketball season. It was not until Calhoun took over the university's basketball program in 1985, however, that UConn grew from a regional basketball power to a nationally prominent one. Under Calhoun, UConn won three national championships (1999, 2004, 2011), seven Big East tournaments, and ten Big East (Note: The American Conference, known before July 2025 as the American Athletic Conference, operated as the Big East Conference from 1979 through 2013. See 2010–2013 Big East Conference realignment for more information. This article uses the name "Big East" to refer to the conference for the years 2013 and earlier.) regular season titles, while placing twenty-six former players into the National Basketball Association (NBA). Following Calhoun's retirement, new head coach Kevin Ollie would lead UConn to a fourth national championship win in 2014. Ollie's successor, current head coach Dan Hurley, led UConn to two more national titles in 2023 and 2024.

Women's basketball was not a major sport at UConn until the arrival of Auriemma in 1985. Under his guidance UConn has enjoyed unprecedented success, winning 12 national titles, including six at the end of undefeated seasons and four consecutive championships from 2013–16. The Huskies also have the two longest winning streaks in NCAA Division I basketball history, at 111 games from 2014–17 and 90 games from 2008–10. Connecticut's rivalry with women's basketball power Tennessee has been one of the most celebrated in the sport. Twenty-six former UConn women's basketball players have gone on to play in the Women's National Basketball Association (WNBA), and seven—Sue Bird in 2002, Diana Taurasi in 2004, Tina Charles in 2010, Maya Moore in 2011, Breanna Stewart in 2016, Paige Bueckers in 2025, and Azzi Fudd in 2026—have been selected first overall in the WNBA draft. Stewart, Moriah Jefferson, and Morgan Tuck were the first three picks in the 2016 draft; this marked the first time three players from the same college were selected 1-2-3 in the draft of any major sport.

Placards honoring the members of the Huskies of Honor are hung at the Harry A. Gampel Pavilion, the on-campus home court of UConn basketball. Additional information about each of the honorees is displayed on the concourse between the upper and lower stands.

== Honorees ==
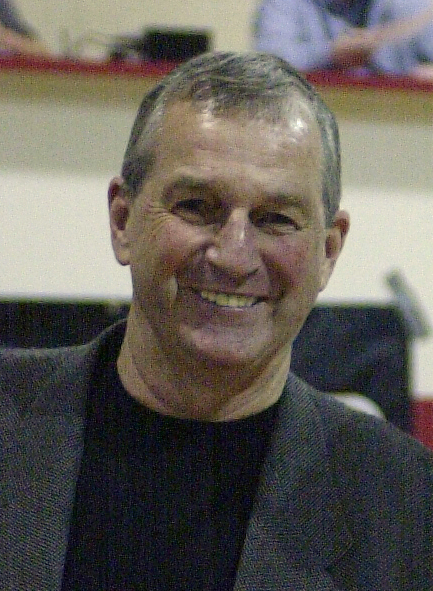
Hall of Fame men's basketball coach Jim Calhoun was an inaugural member of the Huskies of Honor.

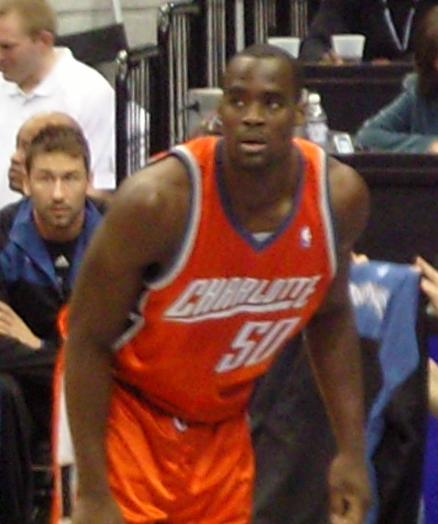
Husky of Honor Emeka Okafor was drafted second overall in the 2004 NBA draft.

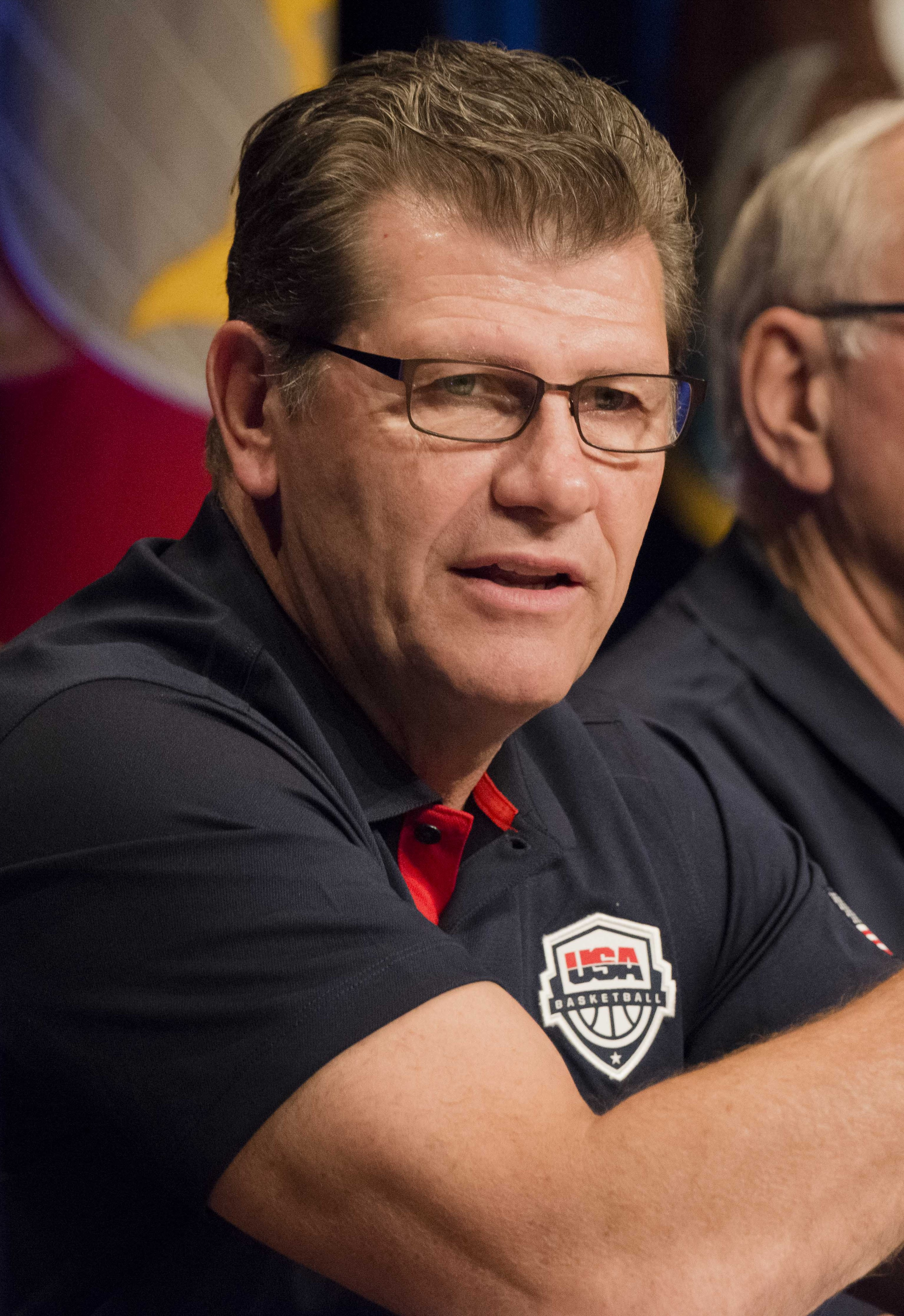
Geno Auriemma was one of the eleven inaugural inductees in 2006 from the women's basketball program into the Huskies of Honor, and the only one who is a man.

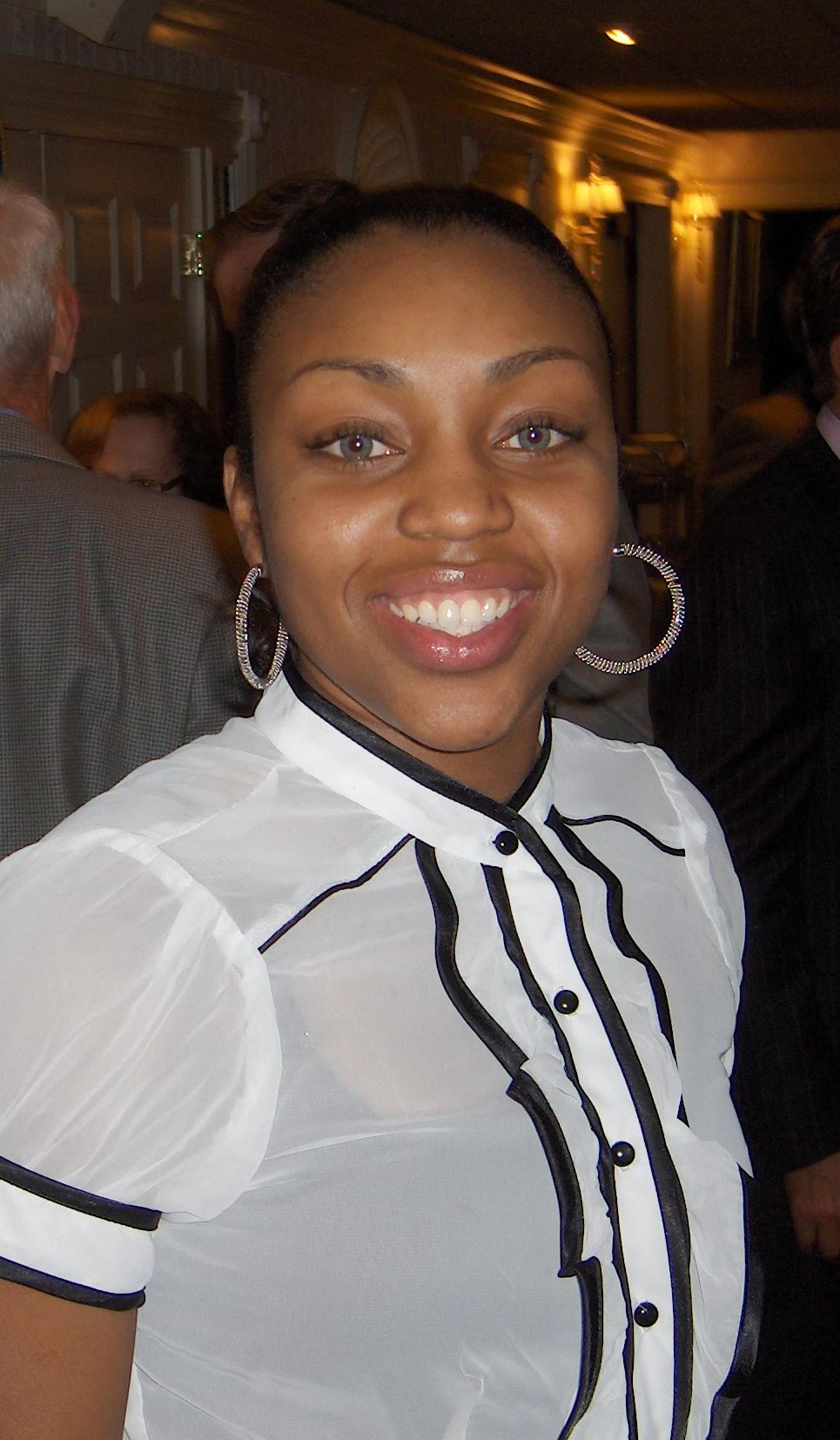
Renee Montgomery was the first player to be named a Husky of Honor while still active.

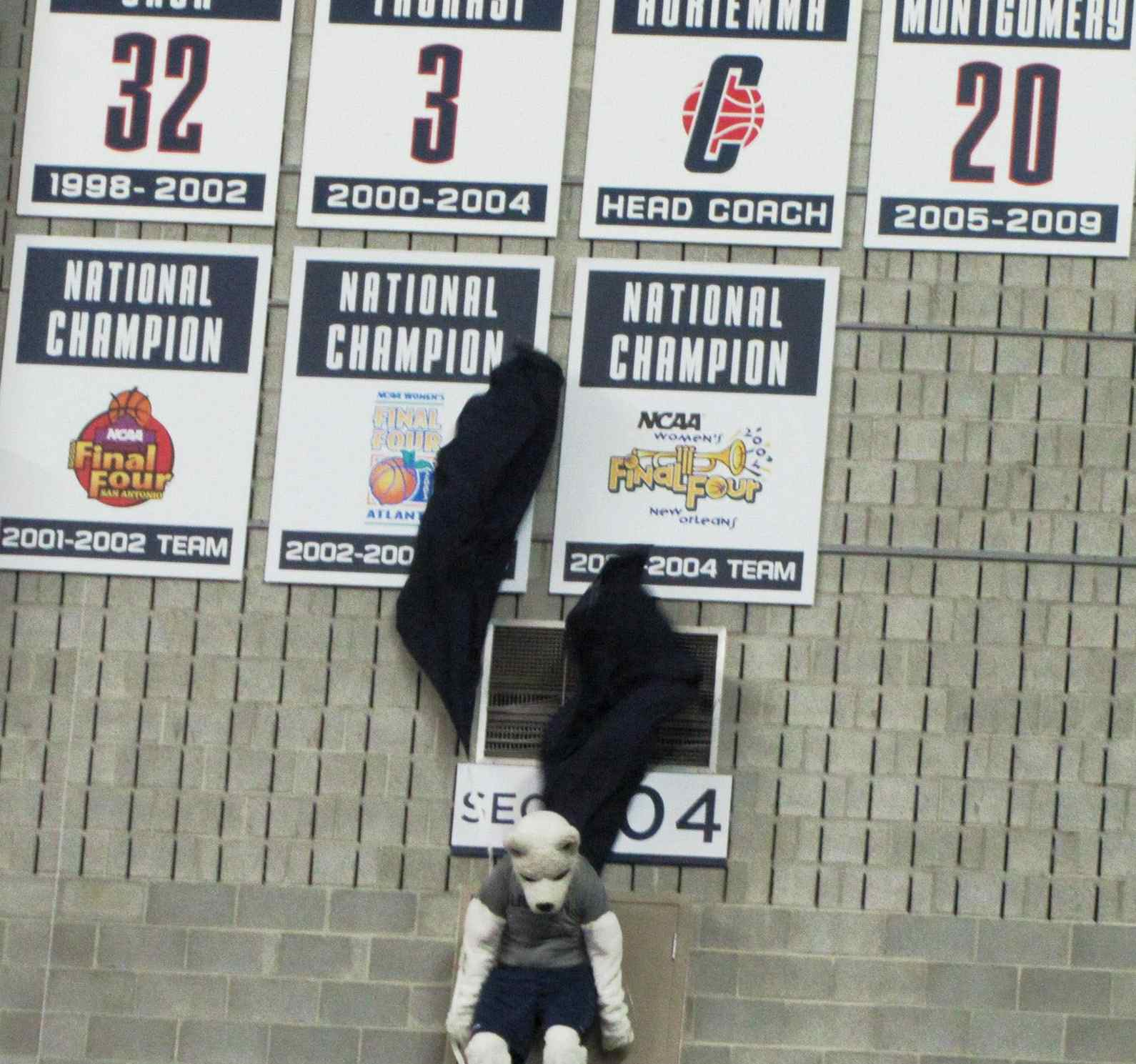
Huskies of Honor additions December 29, 2013

Key
†	Inducted into the Naismith Basketball Hall of Fame

=== Men's basketball ===
No.	Name	Position	Seasons (Note: The seasons listed are those that the individual was with the UConn Huskies in the specific listed position.)	Hometown	Inducted
34	Ray Allen† (Note: Inducted to the Hall of Fame as a player.)	G	1993–96	Merced, California	February 5, 2007
44	Wes Bialosuknia	G	1963–67	Poughkeepsie, New York	February 5, 2007
24	Scott Burrell	G	1989–93	New Haven, Connecticut	November 2, 2018
3	Caron Butler	F	2000–02	Racine, Wisconsin	February 13, 2016
22	Bill Corley	F / C	1965–68	Williston Park, New York	February 15, 2012
3	Walt Dropo	C	1942–47	Moosup, Connecticut	February 5, 2007
42	Khalid El-Amin	G	1997–2000	Minneapolis, Minnesota	February 23, 2014
—	Harrison Fitch	–	1932–34	New Haven, Connecticut	February 19, 2022
22	Rudy Gay	F	2004–06	Baltimore, Maryland	February 25, 2012
4	Ben Gordon	G	2001–04	Mount Vernon, New York	February 7, 2025
32	Richard Hamilton	G / F	1996–99	Coatesville, Pennsylvania	February 5, 2007
42	Tony Hanson	G	1973–77	Waterbury, Connecticut	February 5, 2007
11	Alex Karaban	F	2022–26	Southborough, Massachusetts	February 28, 2026
42	Toby Kimball	F / C	1961–65	Framingham, Massachusetts	February 5, 2007
42	Donyell Marshall	F	1991–94	Reading, Pennsylvania	February 5, 2007
13	Shabazz Napier	G	2010–14	Roxbury, Massachusetts	April 8, 2014
2	Tristen Newton	G	2022–24	El Paso, Texas	April 9, 2024
50	Emeka Okafor	C	2001–04	Bellaire, Texas	February 5, 2007
13	Worthy Patterson	F	1951–54	Greenwich, Connecticut	February 15, 2012
25	Art Quimby	C	1951–55	New London, Connecticut	February 5, 2007
00	Clifford Robinson	F / C	1985–89	Buffalo, New York	February 5, 2007
13	Chris Smith	G	1988–92	Bridgeport, Connecticut	February 5, 2007
34	Hasheem Thabeet	C	2006–09	Dar es Salaam, Tanzania	February 14, 2026
52	Corny Thompson	F	1978–82	Middletown, Connecticut	February 5, 2007
15	Kemba Walker	G	2008–11	Bronx, New York	April 5, 2011
22	Vin Yokabaskas	F	1948–52	Bloomfield, Connecticut	February 5, 2007
—	Jim Calhoun† (Note: Inducted to the Hall of Fame as a coach.)	Head coach	1986–2012	Braintree, Massachusetts	February 5, 2007
—	Dee Rowe	Head coach	1969–77	Worcester, Massachusetts	February 5, 2007
—	Hugh Greer	Head coach	1946–63	Suffield, Connecticut	February 5, 2007
—	1998–99 team	Team	1998–99	—	February 23, 2014
—	2003–04 team	Team	2003–04	—	January 28, 2024

=== Women's basketball ===
No.	Name	Position	Seasons	Hometown	Inducted
25	Svetlana Abrosimova	F	1997–2001	Saint Petersburg, Russia	December 21, 2006
24	Kerry Bascom	C / F	1987–91	Epping, New Hampshire	December 21, 2006
10	Sue Bird†	G	1998–2002	Syosset, New York	December 21, 2006
5	Paige Bueckers	G	2020–25	Hopkins, Minnesota	March 2, 2025
32	Swin Cash†	F	1998–2002	McKeesport, Pennsylvania	December 21, 2006
31	Tina Charles	C	2006–10	Jamaica, New York	February 12, 2010
24	Napheesa Collier	F	2015–19	Jefferson City, Missouri	March 2, 2019
31	Stefanie Dolson	C	2010–14	Port Jervis, New York	March 1, 2014
3	Aaliyah Edwards	F	2020–24	Kingston, Ontario	January 28, 2026
35	Azzi Fudd	G	2021-2026	Fairfax, Virginia	November 8, 2026
14	Bria Hartley	G	2010–14	North Babylon, New York	March 1, 2014
4	Moriah Jefferson	G	2012–16	Glenn Heights, Texas	February 27, 2016
50	Rebecca Lobo† (Note: Inducted to the Hall of Fame as a contributor.)	C / F	1991–95	Southwick, Massachusetts	December 21, 2006
20	Renee Montgomery	G	2005–09	St. Albans, West Virginia	February 15, 2009
23	Maya Moore†	F	2007–11	Lawrenceville, Georgia	February 28, 2011
23	Kaleena Mosqueda-Lewis	F	2011–15	Anaheim Hills, Anaheim, California	February 28, 2015
33	Shea Ralph	G	1996–2001	Fayetteville, North Carolina	December 21, 2006
21	Jennifer Rizzotti	G	1992–96	New Fairfield, Connecticut	December 21, 2006
42	Nykesha Sales	G	1994–98	Bloomfield, Connecticut	December 21, 2006
33	Katie Lou Samuelson	F	2015–19	Fullerton, California	March 2, 2019
30	Breanna Stewart	F	2012–16	North Syracuse, New York	February 27, 2016
3	Diana Taurasi	G	2000–04	Chino, California	December 21, 2006
3	Morgan Tuck	F	2012–16	Grand Rapids, Michigan / Bolingbrook, Illinois	April 6, 2016
15	Gabby Williams	G	2014–18	Sparks, Nevada	February 26, 2018
52	Kara Wolters	C	1993–97	Holliston, Massachusetts	December 21, 2006
—	Geno Auriemma†	Head coach	1985–present	Montella, Italy / Norristown, Pennsylvania	December 21, 2006
—	Chris Dailey	Associate head coach	1985–present	New Brunswick, New Jersey	February 27, 2016
—	1994–95 team	Team	1994–95	—	November 16, 2008
—	1999–2000 team	Team	1999–2000	—	December 23, 2009
—	2001–02 team	Team	2001–02	—	December 29, 2011
—	2002–03 team	Team	2002–03	—	December 29, 2013
—	2003–04 team	Team	2003–04	—	December 29, 2013
—	2008-09 team	Team	2008-09	—	January 27, 2020
—	2009-10 team	Team	2009-10	—	January 27, 2020
—	2012–13 team	Team	2012–13	—	January 27, 2024
—	2013–14 team	Team	2013–14	—	January 27, 2024
—	2014–15 team	Team	2014–15	—	January 15, 2026
—	2015–16 team	Team	2015–16	—	January 15, 2026

=== Administrators ===
No.	Name	Position	Seasons	Hometown	Inducted
—	John Toner	Athletic director	1969–87	Nantucket, Massachusetts	February 28, 2009

== The display ==
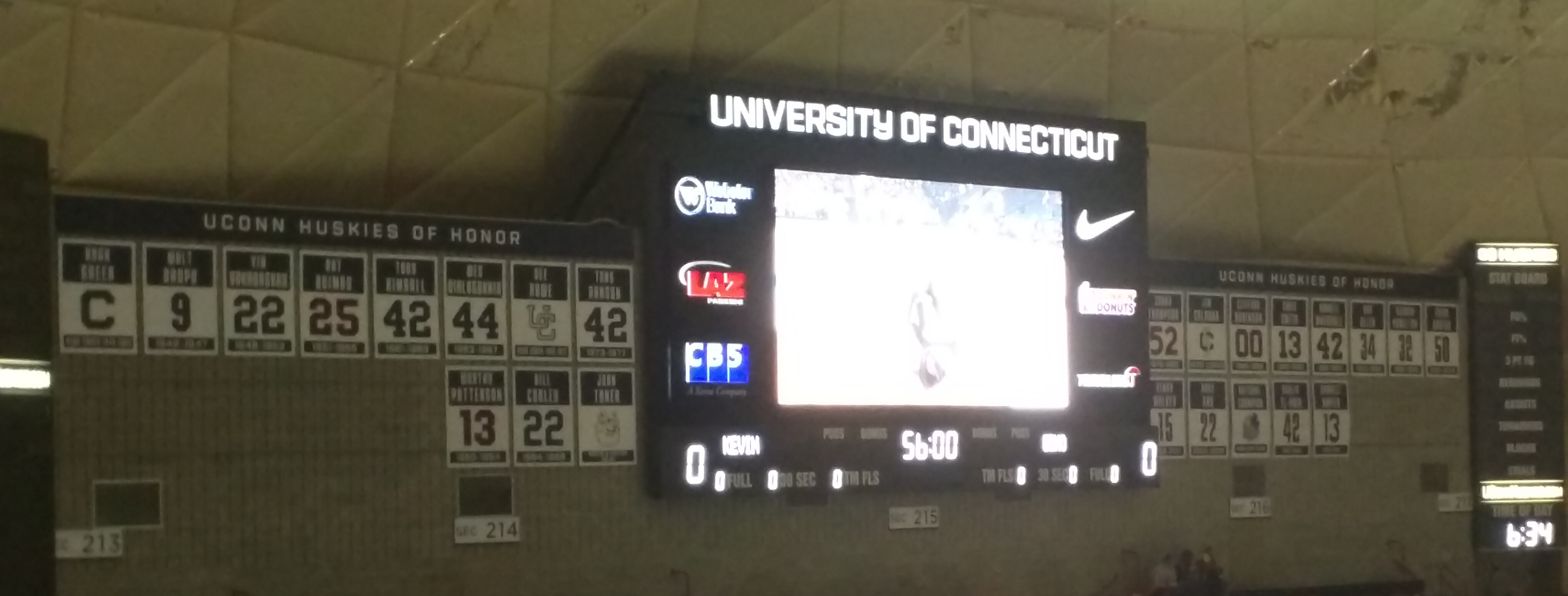
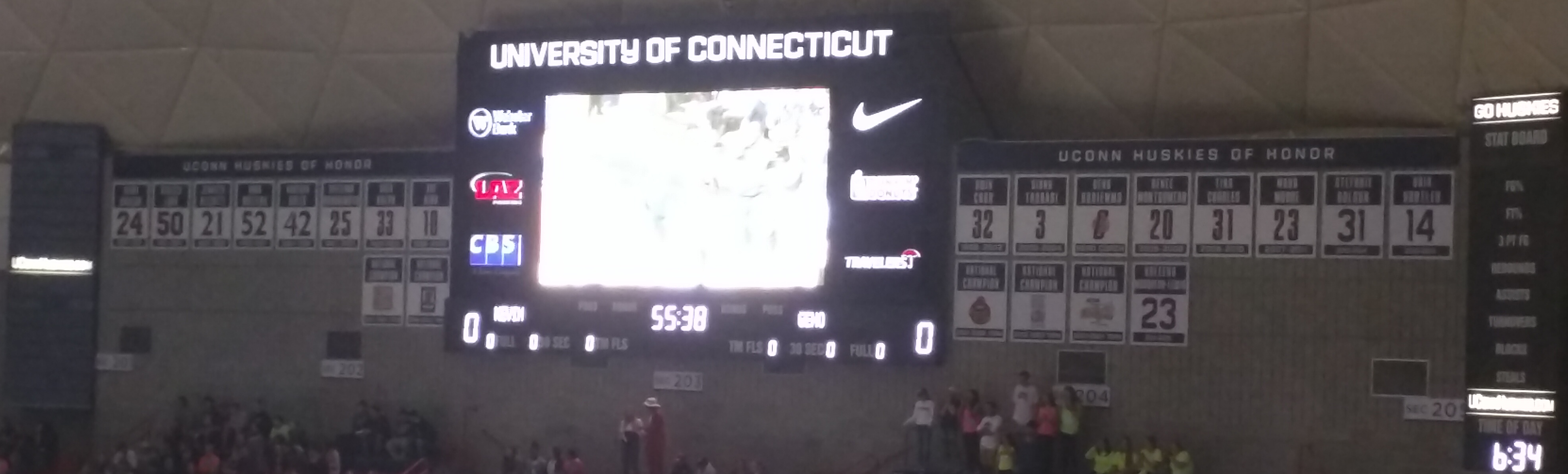
The Huskies of Honor display at Gampel Pavilion, located on either side of the arena on each side of the scoreboards, as of October 17, 2015.
Left are the placards for men's basketball and John Toner; right are the placards for women's basketball.
