= Auburn–UAB men's basketball rivalry =

American college basketball rivalry

- Auburn Tigers UAB Blazers
- Sport: Men's college basketball
- First meeting: November 26, 1982; Auburn 63, UAB 61
- Latest meeting: December 15, 2018; Auburn 75, UAB 71
- Stadiums: Bartow Arena; Beard–Eaves–Memorial Coliseum; Legacy Arena; Neville Arena

Statistics
- Total meetings: 21
- All-time series: Auburn, 11–10
- Largest victory: UAB, 105–76 (Feb. 25, 1989)
- Longest win streak: Auburn, 6 (1998–present)
- Current win streak: Auburn, 6 (1998–present)

Locations of Auburn and UAB

The Auburn–UAB men's basketball rivalry is a men's college basketball rivalry between the Auburn Tigers and the UAB Blazers. Despite its relative youth and a 15-year hiatus from 2000–2014, the rivalry remains one of the fiercest and most competitive in the state of Alabama.

== History ==
=== Formation and early games ===
Auburn University and University of Alabama at Birmingham first played in 1982, just four seasons after the creation of the UAB men's basketball program. The matchup originated as a supplementary event at the Birmingham–Jefferson Civic Center (BJCC) for Auburn fans in Birmingham on the night before the Iron Bowl football game was played at Legion Field, and was initially characterized as a "friendly cage rivalry". However, UAB's quick rise to national prominence led to the Auburn–UAB game gaining significance in its own right. Three of those first five games in the BJCC saw one of the two teams come in ranked in the top 25, and the 1984 game remains the third-largest home crowd in UAB basketball history. The turnout in the early years was sizable; the lowest turnout in the first four matchups was 15,502, all played at Birmingham-Jefferson Coliseum. The 1989 game was the first to be played in Auburn.

Following a one-year break, Auburn and UAB played each other for 12 consecutive seasons. UAB was dominant during this period, winning eight out of ten games from 1989–1997. The 1997 and 1998 editions of the rivalry were played in the Holiday Hardwood Classic at the BJCC as part of a doubleheader with Alabama.

In the lead-up to the 1996 matchup, The Anniston Star reported that various "subplots" added "a touch of drama" to the Auburn–UAB rivalry. That year, Auburn senior Wes Flanigan, an all-SEC point guard whose battle with cancer had received national media attention, was playing his first game since his diagnosis.

=== Hiatus ===
Following their 1999 matchup, Auburn head coach Cliff Ellis wanted the series to be played at Auburn until the number of games played in Auburn was equal to those played in Birmingham. UAB athletic director Gene Bartow and UAB head coach Murry Bartow refused to play the game exclusively in Auburn, so the series came to a halt. Despite pleas from both the media and the fans to continue the rivalry, no games were scheduled between the two programs for 15 seasons.

=== Rivalry renewal ===
In May 2015, following UAB's NCAA tournament upset over 3-seed Iowa State and Bruce Pearl's first season at Auburn, UAB announced that they had reached an agreement to play Auburn in a four-game series. The first game would be played at Auburn, the second at UAB, then back at Auburn, then finally at Legacy Arena. (formerly the BJCC) Auburn won the first game of the series renewal in front of a sold out Auburn Arena, 75–74, on a 3-pointer in the final seconds of the game. In 2016, Auburn defeated UAB in the first game played at Bartow Arena in the series since 1996, 74–70. Auburn lead the entire game in a 85–80 victory to tie the series at 10 games apiece in 2017. Carrying a #8 ranking into the 2018 matchup, Auburn managed to survive a scare from UAB in overtime at Legacy Arena, 75–71, completing the series sweep against the Blazers. Auburn and UAB have not met since.

== Game results ==
Auburn victories	UAB victories	Tie games

No.	Date	Location	Winner	Score
1	November 26, 1982	BJCC Coliseum	Auburn	63–61
2	December 2, 1983	BJCC Coliseum	UAB	69–62
3	November 30, 1984	BJCC Coliseum	Auburn	62–59
4	December 10, 1985	BJCC Coliseum	No. 16 UAB	62–56
5	November 28, 1986	BJCC Coliseum	No. 12 Auburn	68–58
6	January 21, 1989	BJCC Coliseum	UAB	105–76
7	December 1, 1989	Joel H. Eaves Memorial Coliseum	UAB	75–65
8	November 30, 1990	UAB Arena	UAB	71–65
9	November 29, 1991	BJCC Coliseum	UAB	88–74
10	February 9, 1993	UAB Arena	Auburn	86–74
11	December 16, 1993	Beard–Eaves–Memorial Coliseum	UAB	69–65
12	November 30, 1994	UAB Arena	Auburn	60–54
13	December 3, 1995	Beard–Eaves–Memorial Coliseum	UAB	66–54
14	November 22, 1996	UAB Arena	UAB	64–57
15	December 20, 1997	BJCC Coliseum	UAB	71–65
16	December 12, 1998	BJCC Coliseum	Auburn	77–64
17	November 19, 1999	Beard–Eaves–Memorial Coliseum	No. 3 Auburn	65–59
18	November 13, 2015	Auburn Arena	Auburn	75–74
19	December 3, 2016	Bartow Arena	Auburn	74–70
20	December 9, 2017	Auburn Arena	Auburn	85–80
21	December 15, 2018	Legacy Arena	No. 8 Auburn	75–71^{OT}
Series: Auburn leads 11–10
