= Ronnie Johnson =

American basketball player (born 1993)

No. 3 – Niagara River Lions
- Position: Point guard
- League: NBL Canada

Personal information
- Born: December 12, 1993 (age 32)
- Listed height: 6 ft 0 in (1.83 m)
- Listed weight: 180 lb (82 kg)

Career information
- High school: North Central (Indianapolis, Indiana)
- College: Purdue (2012–2014); Houston (2015–2016); Auburn (2016–2017)
- NBA draft: 2017: undrafted
- Playing career: 2018–present

Career history
- 2018–present: Niagara River Lions

Te'Ron Stephon Johnson (born December 12, 1993) is an American professional basketball player for the Niagara River Lions of the NBL Canada. He played college basketball for Purdue, Houston and Auburn.

== High school career ==
Johnson attended North Central High School in Indianapolis. Johnson was twice named to the Associated Press All-State and was named the Marion County Player of the Year as a senior in 2012. He was also an IndyStar Indiana All-Star in 2012. He committed to Purdue to play alongside older brother Terone Johnson.

== College career ==
Ronnie Johnson averaged 10.3 points, 4.1 assists and 3.4 rebounds per game as a freshman at Purdue. In his sophomore season, Johnson averaged 10.8 points and 3.7 assists per game. However, he said he felt coach Matt Painter lost confidence in him. After visiting Xavier and receiving interest from Tennessee, Johnson transferred to Houston after the season and sat out a year. He started 13 games as a redshirt junior at Houston and averaged 9.4 points and 2.9 assists per game. After the season, he transferred again to Auburn. As a senior at Auburn, Johnson averaged 7.8 points and 2.3 assists per game on an 18–14 team.

== Professional career ==
Johnson joined the Niagara River Lions of NBL Canada in January 2018. In his first game against the KW Titans, he scored seven points. He had a season-high 24 points in a 126–123 win over the Cape Breton Highlanders on March 14. Johnson averaged 7.4 points, 2.6 rebounds and 2.2 assists per game in his rookie season.
