= Marissa Perry =

American actress and singer (born 1985)

- Born: May 5, 1985 (age 39)
- Notable work: Hairspray

Marissa Perry (born May 5, 1985) is an American actress and singer born in Waterbury, Connecticut.

Perry acted in the Broadway musical Hairspray in the leading role of Tracy Turnblad.

Perry had been playing Tracy Turnblad in the Weston Playhouse production of Hairspray in Weston, Vermont when the writers of Hairspray, Marc Shaiman and Scott Wittman, saw her performance and encouraged her to audition for the Broadway production. Shortly thereafter, she was cast as the understudy for the role and was eventually promoted to playing the role full-time. She reprised the role of Tracy in the Marriott Theatre's production of Hairspray in Lincolnshire, Illinois, which ran from September 23 to December 6, 2009. She again reprised the role of Tracy at the 2010 Reagle Music Theatre production of Hairspray and was nominated for the IRNE Award for Best Actress in a Musical.

Perry appeared in earlier regional theatre productions, including the world premiere of Princesses at the Goodspeed Opera House in East Haddam, Connecticut as well as at the 5th Avenue Theatre in Seattle, Washington and Wild Mushrooms at the Seven Angels Theatre in Waterbury, Connecticut.

Perry was part of the ensemble in the Broadway production of Sister Act, as well as the understudy for Sister Mary Patrick, from its opening on April 20, 2011, to its closing on August 26, 2012.
