= Sacred Heart High School (Connecticut) =

Private Catholic coed school in the U.S.

Location
- 142 South Elm Street; Waterbury, (New Haven County), Connecticut 06706; United States; 41°33′6″N 73°2′16″W

Information
- Type: Private, Coeducational
- Motto: Learning, Spirit, Service
- Religious affiliation: Roman Catholic
- Established: 1922
- Status: Closed
- Closed: 2021
- School district: Archdiocese of Hartford
- Superintendent: Valerie Mara (interim)
- President: Eileen Reagan
- Principal: Anthony Azzara
- Teaching staff: 30 Full/part-time teachers
- Grades: 9–12
- Average class size: 21
- Colors: Maroon and gold
- Athletics conference: Naugatuck Valley League
- Sports: Boys: football, soccer, cross-country, basketball, swimming, baseball, tennis, cheerleading, indoor track, golf, track & field Girls: soccer, swimming, cross-country, basketball, softball, cheerleading, golf, indoor track, dance, tennis, track & field, cooperative gymnastics
- Mascot: Hearts
- Accreditation: New England Association of Schools and Colleges
- School fees: $500
- Tuition: $7750
- Website: sacredhearthighschool.org

Sacred Heart High School was a private, Roman Catholic high school located in the downtown district in the city of Waterbury, Connecticut. It was in the jurisdiction of the Roman Catholic Archdiocese of Hartford. The school was named after the most holy Sacred Heart of Jesus.

== Background ==
Sacred Heart was established in 1922 as an all-girls school. The school became coeducational in 1938. Since 1975, the school was located in the old Waterbury Catholic High School building in downtown Waterbury.

== Closure ==
On February 11, 2021, Sacred Heart announced it would be closing at the end of the 2020–2021 school year. The school's president said it was in part due to declining enrollment at the school.

== Athletics ==
=== Conferences ===
- Part of the Naugatuck Valley League (NVL)
- Part of the Connecticut Interscholastic Athletic Conference (CIAC)

== Notable alumni ==
- John Gereski - Former Adjutant General of the State of Connecticut 1985 to 1992. Christopher Nugai - Former College Football Coach

=== Baseball ===
- Ron Diorio - Former professional baseball pitcher for the Philadelphia Phillies
- Dave Wallace - Former professional baseball pitcher, pitching coach and front office executive.

=== Basketball ===
- Tyrn Flowers - Professional basketball player, played college basketball for Long Island University
- Mustapha Heron - Professional basketball player, played college basketball at Auburn University and St John's University

=== Politician ===
- Gary Franks - Politician who was a member of the US House of Representatives from Connecticut from 1991-1997
- Michael Jarjura - Attorney and politician who served as the mayor of Waterbury from 2001-2011.

=== Media Personality ===
- Adam Lopez - A media personality and award show host who has hosted the New England Music Awards five consecutive times from 2021-2025.
