= Jrue Holiday =

American basketball player (born 1990)

- Holiday with the Portland Trail Blazers in 2026

No. 5 – Portland Trail Blazers
- Position: Point guard / shooting guard
- League: NBA

Personal information
- Born: June 12, 1990 (age 36) Los Angeles, California, U.S.
- Listed height: 6 ft 4 in (1.93 m)
- Listed weight: 220 lb (100 kg)

Career information
- High school: Campbell Hall (Los Angeles, California)
- College: UCLA (2008–2009)
- NBA draft: 2009: 1st round, 17th overall pick
- Drafted by: Philadelphia 76ers
- Playing career: 2009–present

Career history
- 2009–2013: Philadelphia 76ers
- 2013–2020: New Orleans Pelicans
- 2020–2023: Milwaukee Bucks
- 2023–2025: Boston Celtics
- 2025–present: Portland Trail Blazers

Career highlights
- 2× NBA champion (2021, 2024); 2× NBA All-Star (2013, 2023); 3× NBA All-Defensive First Team (2018, 2021, 2023); 3× NBA All-Defensive Second Team (2019, 2022, 2024); Pac-10 All-Freshman Team (2009); Gatorade National Player of the Year (2008); First-team Parade All-American (2008); Third-team Parade All-American (2007); McDonald's All-American (2008); California Mr. Basketball (2008)
- Stats at NBA.com
- Stats at Basketball Reference
Medals
Men's basketball
Representing the United States
Summer Olympics
Gold medal – first place	2020 Tokyo	Team
Gold medal – first place	2024 Paris	Team

Jrue Randall Holiday (/druː/ DROO; born June 12, 1990) is an American professional basketball player for the Portland Trail Blazers of the National Basketball Association (NBA). He played college basketball for one season with the UCLA Bruins before being selected by the Philadelphia 76ers in the first round of the 2009 NBA draft with the 17th overall pick.

Holiday played four seasons with the Philadelphia 76ers before being traded to the New Orleans Pelicans in 2013. In 2020, he was traded to the Milwaukee Bucks and won his first NBA championship with the team in 2021. Holiday was later traded to the Boston Celtics via the Portland Trail Blazers in 2023 and won his second NBA championship with the team in 2024 before being traded back to Portland in the 2025 offseason. Holiday is a two-time NBA All-Star and six-time NBA All-Defensive Team member. He also won a gold medal with the 2020 and 2024 U.S. Olympic teams.

== Early life ==
Holiday was born to Shawn & Toya (née DeCree) Holiday. His parents both played college basketball at Arizona State, where Toya was named Pac-10 Player of the Year in 1982. Holiday attended Campbell Hall School in the Los Angeles district of Studio City, California. As a senior, he averaged 25.9 points, 11.2 rebounds, 6.9 assists, 4.8 steals per game. The team went 31–5 and won the California Division IV state title. Holiday was rated the No. 1 point guard and the No. 2 overall prospect in the Class of 2008 by Rivals.com. He was named the 2008 Gatorade National Player of the Year and a Parade first-team All-American. Holiday also played in the McDonald's All-American Game, tallying 14 points, five rebounds, three assists, and five steals. Off the court, he was a member of Campbell Hall's gospel choir, the percussion section leader in the school's orchestra, and the manager of the school's girls' tennis team.

== College career ==
In 2008–09, Holiday played alongside fellow future NBA player Darren Collison in the backcourt at UCLA. In 35 games (all starts), he averaged 8.5 points, 3.8 rebounds, 3.7 assists and 1.6 steals in 27.1 minutes per game. Holiday shot 45.0% from the floor, 30.7% from three-point range and 72.6% from the line, earning Pac-10 All-Freshman Team honors. He scored a career-high 20 points on a perfect 8-of-8 shooting in just 19 minutes of play against Florida International. Holiday had 13 points and six assists in UCLA's one-point win over Virginia Commonwealth in the first round of the NCAA tournament. After the season, he declared for the NBA draft, forgoing his final three years of college eligibility.

== Professional career ==
=== Philadelphia 76ers (2009–2013) ===
==== Early years (2009–2012) ====
Holiday was drafted 17th overall by the Philadelphia 76ers in the 2009 NBA draft. On April 3, 2010, he scored a season-high 25 points against the Toronto Raptors.

On November 5, 2010, Holiday set a new career high with 29 points against the Cleveland Cavaliers. On February 2, 2011, he recorded his first career triple-double with 11 points, 10 rebounds, and 11 assists against the New Jersey Nets.

On March 17, 2012, Holiday set a new career high with 30 points against the Chicago Bulls.

==== First All-Star selection (2012–2013) ====
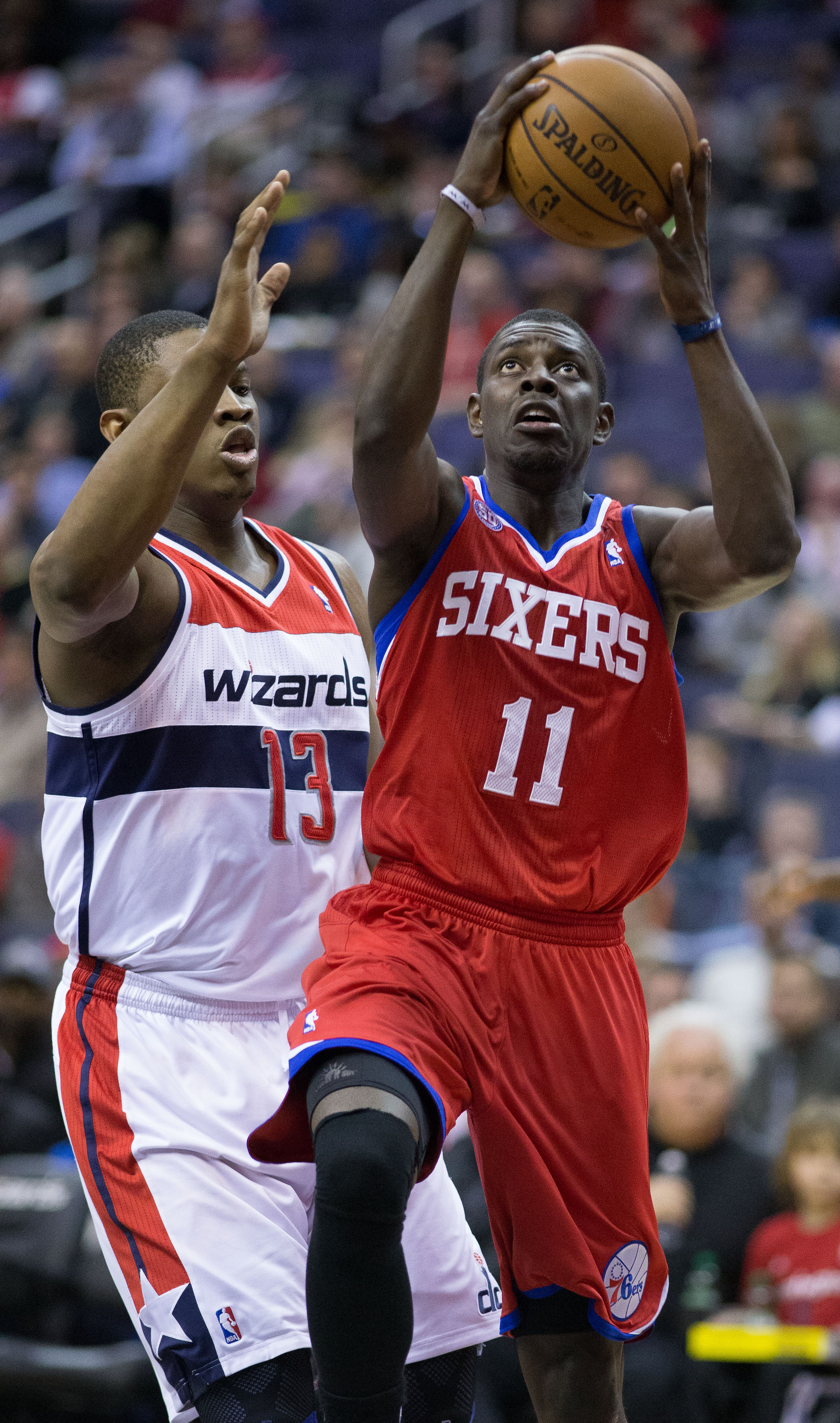
Holiday going against Kevin Séraphin of the Wizards in March 2013

Prior to the start of the season, Holiday signed a four-year, $41 million extension through the 2016–2017 season. On November 25, 2012, Holiday set a new career high with 33 points against the Phoenix Suns. On January 2, 2013, he recorded his second career triple-double with 16 points, 10 rebounds and 10 assists against the Suns. On January 18, Holiday matched his career high with 33 points against the Toronto Raptors. Eight days later, he scored a career-high 35 points against the New York Knicks. On January 24, Holiday was selected as a reserve for the Eastern Conference All-Star team for the 2013 NBA All-Star Game. With his first All-Star selection, the 22-year-old Holiday became the youngest player in franchise history to be named an All-Star.

=== New Orleans Pelicans (2013–2020) ===
==== Injuries and comeback (2013–2017) ====
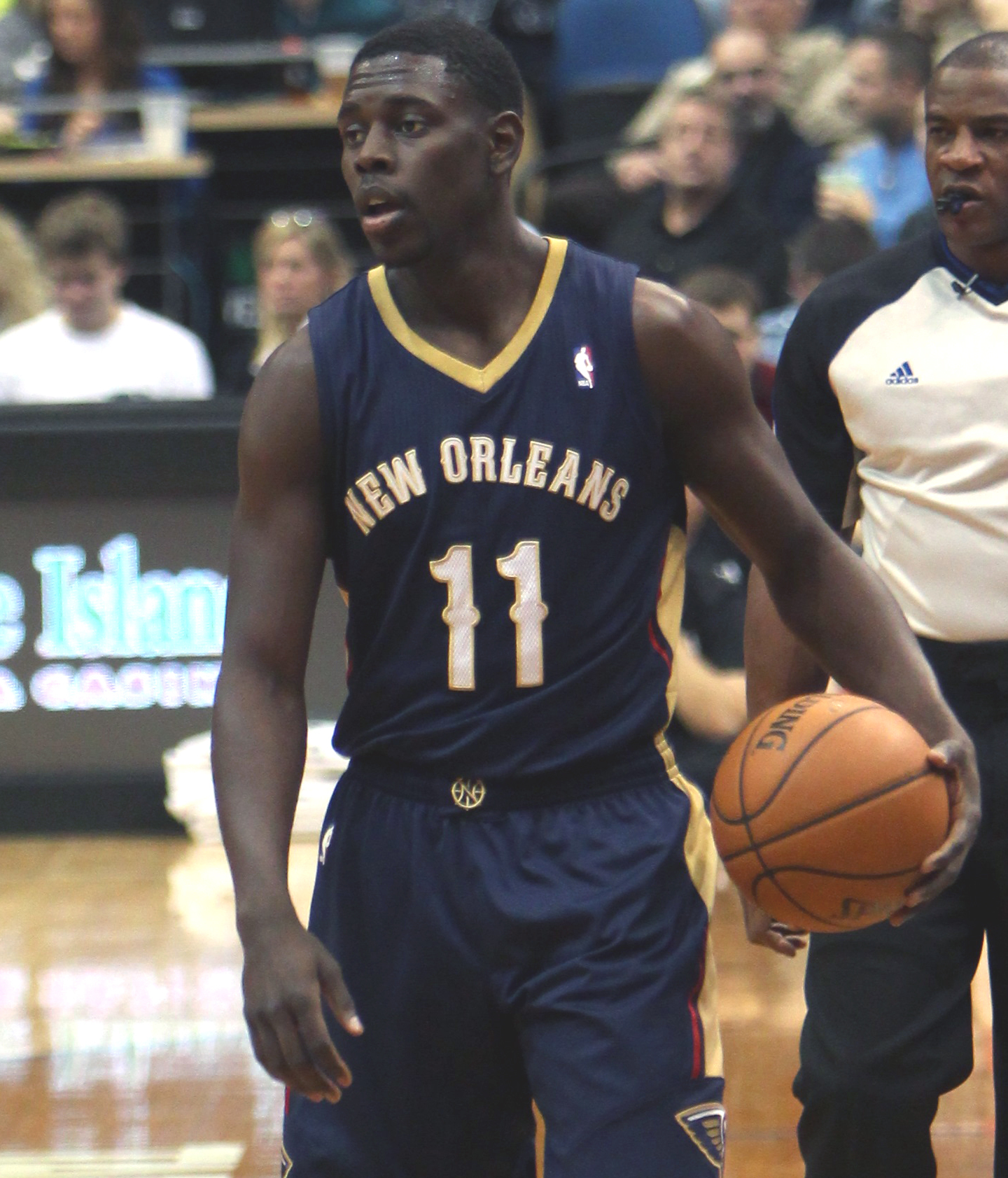
Holiday in January 2014

On July 12, 2013, Holiday was traded to the New Orleans Pelicans in exchange for Nerlens Noel and the Pelicans' 2014 first-round draft pick. His 2013–14 season ended prematurely after season-ending surgery in February 2014 for a stress fracture in his right tibia. Holiday had not played since January 8 due to the shin injury. In 34 games, he averaged 14.3 points, 7.9 assists and 1.6 steals per game.

On January 5, 2015, against the Washington Wizards, Holiday reached 5,000 career points. On February 18, he was ruled out for three weeks after aggravating an already injured lower right leg. Holiday returned to action much later than originally expected, coming off the bench against the Phoenix Suns on April 10 after missing 41 games.

On March 9, 2016, Holiday scored a career-high 38 points against the Charlotte Hornets. On March 29, he was ruled out for the rest of the season after being diagnosed with a right interior orbital wall fracture.

On November 18, 2016, Holiday made his season debut after missing the Pelicans' first 12 games while on a leave of absence to care for his wife. In 23 minutes off the bench, Holiday scored 21 points on 8-of-14 shooting in a 113–101 victory over the Portland Trail Blazers. On January 23, 2017, he had 33 points and 10 assists in a 124–122 win over the Cleveland Cavaliers.

==== First All-Defensive selection and Teammate of the Year Award (2017–2020) ====
On July 6, 2017, Holiday re-signed with the Pelicans to a five-year, $126 million contract. On November 9, he had a season-high 34 points and 11 assists in a 122–118 loss to the Toronto Raptors. On December 4, Holiday scored 34 points in a 125–115 loss to the Golden State Warriors. Six days later against the Philadelphia 76ers, he made five three-pointers in the fourth quarter, when he scored 19 of his 34 points, helping the Pelicans win 131–124. The next day, Holiday had a season-high 37 points in a 130–123 loss to the Houston Rockets. On February 25, 2018, he scored 28 of his 36 points after halftime to lead the Pelicans to a 123–121 overtime victory over the Milwaukee Bucks. On March 6, Holiday recorded 19 points and 17 assists in a 121–116 victory over the Los Angeles Clippers. On March 27, he had 21 points, 11 assists, and 11 rebounds in a 107–103 loss to the Portland Trail Blazers.

In Game 2 of the Pelicans' first-round playoff series against the Trail Blazers, Holiday had a career playoff-high 33 points, helping New Orleans take a 2–0 series lead with a 111–102 victory. In Game 4, he scored 41 points as the Pelicans completed a first-round sweep of the Trail Blazers with a 131–123 victory. The Pelicans went on to lose in five games to the Warriors in the second round, with Holiday recording 27 points, 10 rebounds, and 11 assists in a 113–104 loss in Game 5.

On November 7, 2018, Holiday had 17 points, 10 rebounds and nine assists in a 107–98 victory over the Chicago Bulls. He eclipsed 2,000 career assists with his fifth of the game. Five days later, Holiday had 29 points and matched a season high with 14 assists in a 126–110 victory over the Raptors. On December 3, he had season highs of 32 points and 14 assists in a 129–126 loss to the Clippers. Six days later, Holiday scored 37 points in a 116–108 victory over the Detroit Pistons. On January 29, 2019, he had 19 points, eight assists, six rebounds, and a career-high six blocks in a 121–116 victory over the Rockets, becoming the first guard in NBA history with at least 17 points, six rebounds, seven assists, and six blocks in a game. On March 26, Holiday underwent season-ending surgery to repair a core muscle injury.

On December 28, 2019, against the Indiana Pacers, Holiday and brothers Justin and Aaron of the Pacers became the first trio of brothers to share an NBA court simultaneously. On March 8, 2020, Holiday scored a season-high 37 points with nine rebounds and eight assists in a 120–107 victory over the Minnesota Timberwolves.

=== Milwaukee Bucks (2020–2023) ===
==== 2020–21 season: Sportsmanship Award and First NBA championship ====
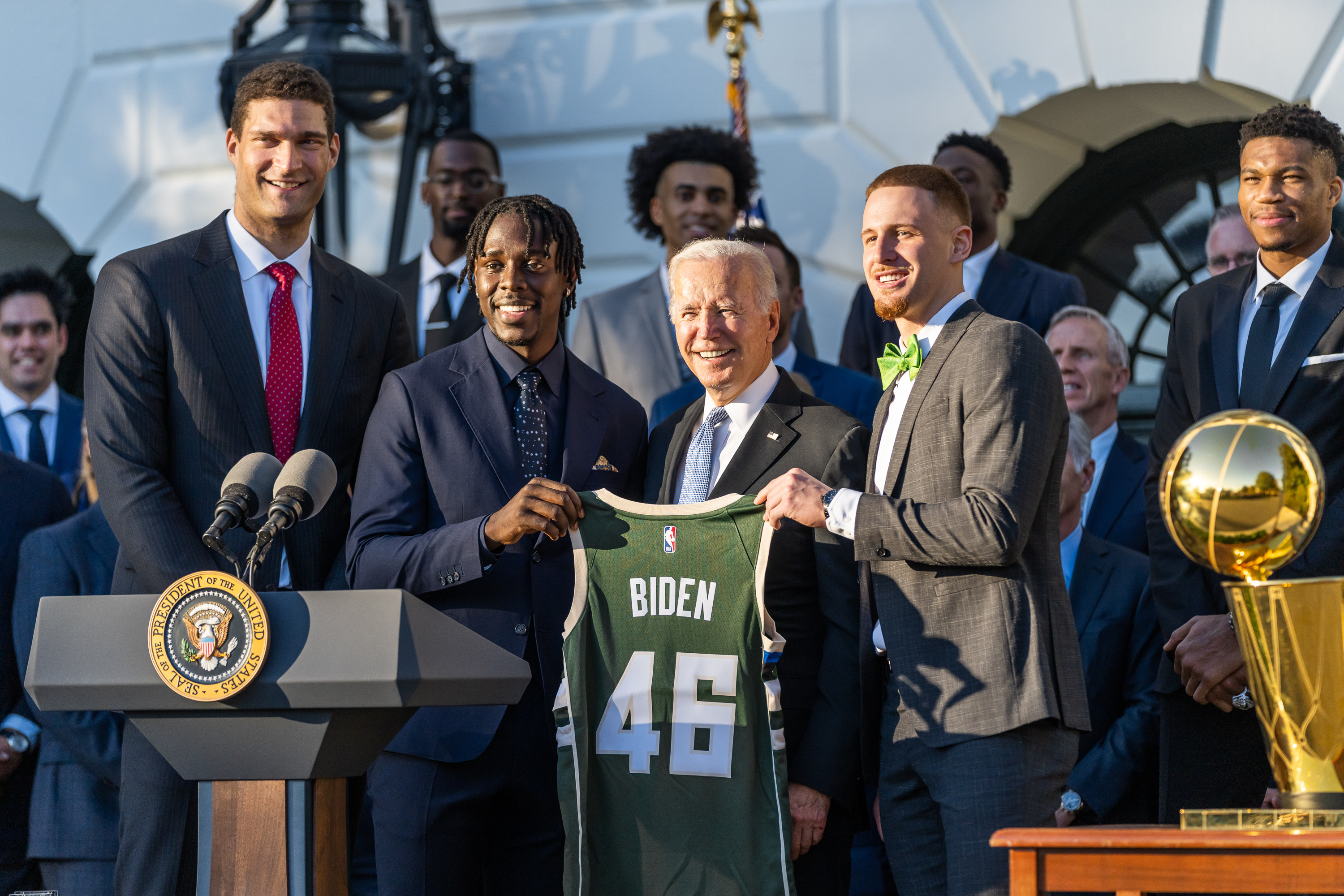
Holiday and the Milwaukee Bucks with President Joe Biden at the White House after their 2021 NBA championship

On November 24, 2020, Holiday was traded to the Milwaukee Bucks in a four-team trade, involving the Denver Nuggets and Oklahoma City Thunder, in which the Pelicans acquired Eric Bledsoe, Steven Adams, and draft compensation.

On March 4, 2021, Holiday scored 15 points in 23 minutes and hit a game-winning 11-foot jump shot in a narrow 112–111 victory over the Memphis Grizzlies. On April 3, he scored a season-high 33 points on 14-of-23 shooting with seven rebounds and 11 assists in a narrow 129–128 victory over the Kings. The following day, Holiday agreed to a four-year contract extension with the Bucks, worth up to $160 million. He had an option for the 2021–22 season worth $26 million. On his way to an NBA First Team All Defense selection, Holiday averaged a team-high 1.63 steals per game for the Bucks, which was fifth best in the league. He also made multiple steals in 32 games, which was the second most of any player in the league over the season.

On May 24, 2021, Holiday recorded a postseason career-high 15 assists, alongside 11 points and seven rebounds, in a 132–98 Game 2 victory over the Miami Heat in their first-round playoff series. The Bucks eventually won the series in a four-game sweep. In Game 3 of the Eastern Conference Semifinals, the Bucks trailed 83–82 late and were facing a potential 3–0 series deficit until Holiday scored the go-ahead layup with 11.4 seconds left to give the Bucks a one point lead, with them eventually winning the game 86–83. The Bucks would go on to win the series in 7. In Game 6 of the Eastern Conference Finals against the Atlanta Hawks, Holiday recorded 27 points, nine rebounds and nine assists in a 118–107 victory, leading the Bucks to the 2021 NBA Finals for the first time since 1974. In Game 5 of the NBA Finals against the Phoenix Suns, Holiday put up 27 points, four rebounds, and 13 assists, and recorded a critical steal from Devin Booker, which led to an alley-oop to Giannis Antetokounmpo with less than 20 seconds left in the fourth quarter to help the Bucks win 123–119. In Game 6, Holiday recorded a near triple-double with 12 points, nine rebounds, and 11 assists to help Milwaukee to a 105–98 victory, closing out the Suns 4–2, securing the 2021 NBA title for the Bucks and awarding Holiday his first championship.

==== 2021–22 season: Coming up short ====
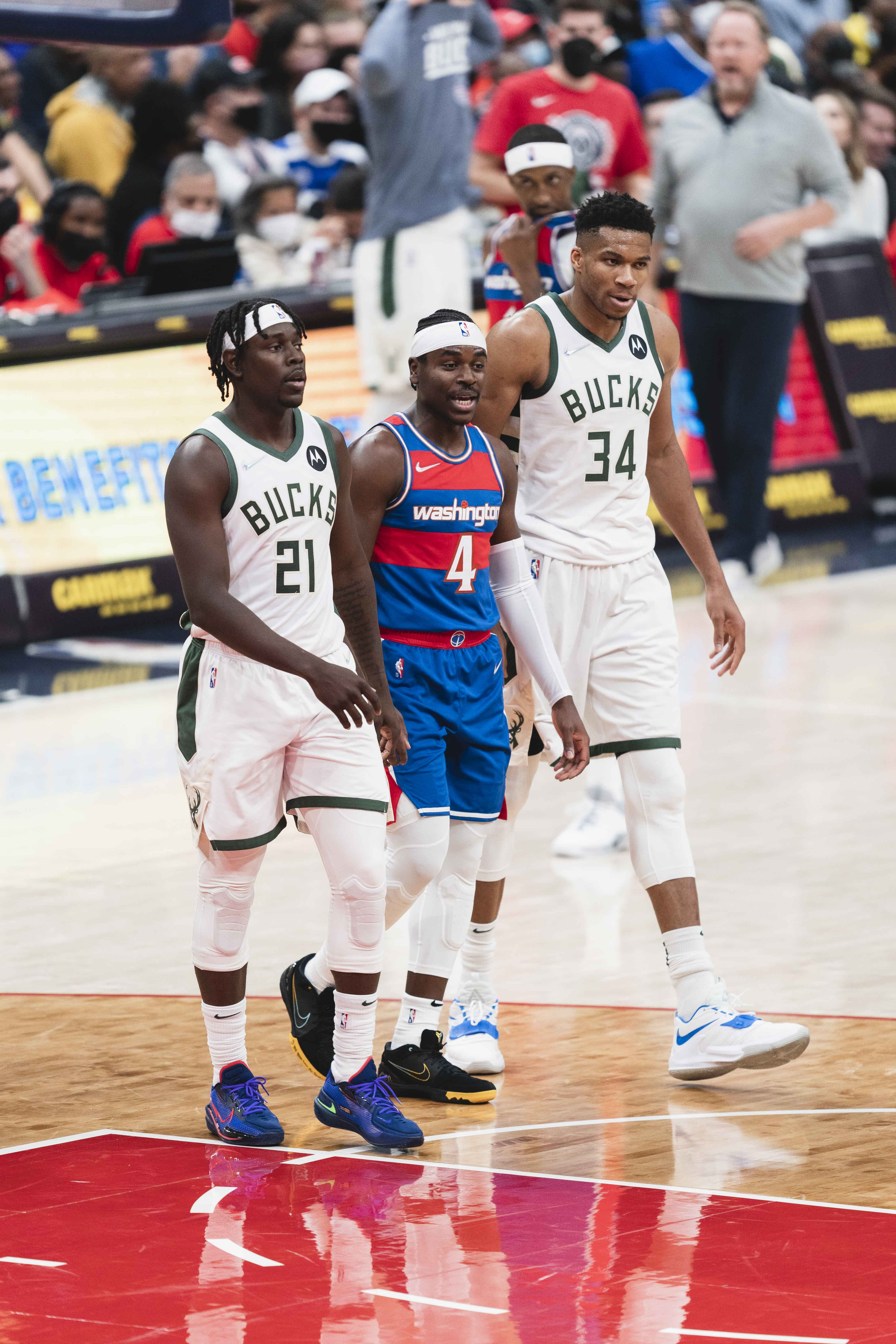
Holiday (left) with his brother Aaron (center) of the Washington Wizards in 2021

In October 2021, Holiday missed six games due to an ankle injury. On December 15, 2021, Holiday recorded 26 points and 14 assists in a 114–99 victory over the Indiana Pacers in which Milwaukee was missing its other two "big three" members Giannis Antetokounmpo and Khris Middleton. On December 17, Holiday scored a career-high 40 points, grabbed five rebounds, delivered five assists, and had two steals in a 116–112 overtime loss against his former team, the New Orleans Pelicans.

On March 2, 2022, Holiday banked in a driving layup with 1.9 seconds left as the Bucks rallied from a 14-point deficit in the final six minutes to narrowly beat the Miami Heat 120–119. He finished the game with 25 points, six rebounds, 11 assists, and two steals. The following game, Holiday scored 16 of his 26 points in the fourth quarter (10 in the final five minutes) along with eight rebounds and five assists in a 118–112 victory over the Chicago Bulls. On March 31, he recorded a season-high six steals, along with scoring 18 points and grabbing a season-high eight rebounds, in a 120–119 overtime victory over the Brooklyn Nets.

On April 24, during Game 4 of the first round of the playoffs, Holiday posted 26 points and seven assists in a 119–95 victory over the Bulls. On May 7, in Game 3 of the Eastern Conference Semifinals, he scored 25 points including the game-winner in a narrow 103–101 victory over the Boston Celtics. Four days later in Game 5, Holiday stopped Marcus Smart on the Celtics' last two plays, recording a block and a steal to preserve the Bucks' lead in their 110–107 comeback victory as they overcame a 14-point fourth-quarter deficit. Holiday finished the game with 24 points, eight rebounds, and eight assists. However, the Bucks lost to in Game 7 on May 15 despite Holiday's 21-point, five-rebound, eight-assist and two-steal outing.

==== 2022–23 season: Second All-Star Selection ====
On October 31, 2022, Holiday recorded 25 points (including a game-securing step-back three-pointer with 45 seconds left), 10 assists and seven rebounds while leading the Bucks to a narrow 110–108 victory over the Detroit Pistons. On January 16, 2023, he scored a then season-high 35 points and delivered 11 assists on 13-of-19 shooting, 5-of-8 from three, and 4-of-4 from the free-throw line in a 132–119 victory over the Indiana Pacers. In the next game, Holiday upped his season high to 37 points, along with six rebounds, seven assists, and two steals in a 130–122 victory over the Toronto Raptors. In both games, Milwaukee was missing its other two "Big Three" members, Giannis Antetokounmpo and Khris Middleton. On January 23, Holiday was named the NBA Eastern Conference Player of the Week for Week 14 (January 16–22), his second career NBA Player of the Week award. Holiday led the Bucks to a 2–1 week with averages of 33.3 points, 9.3 assists, 4.7 rebounds, and 1.7 steals per game while shooting 56.9% from the field and 47.8% from three.

On February 2, Holiday was named to the 2023 NBA All-Star Game as a reserve guard for the Eastern Conference for the first time in 10 seasons, the longest gap between selections for any player in NBA history. On February 14, Holiday tied a then career-high 40 points, with a career-high eight three-point shots made, during a 131–125 overtime victory over the Boston Celtics. On March 29, he scored a career-high 51 points, along with eight rebounds and eight assists on 67% field goal percentage in 32 minutes, leading the Bucks to a 149–136 victory over the Indiana Pacers. On April 5, Holiday recorded 20 points, eight rebounds and a season-high 15 assists in a 105–92 victory over the Chicago Bulls, wrapping up the top seed in the NBA playoffs for the Bucks.

On April 16, in the opening game of the playoffs, Holiday posted 16 points, seven rebounds and a playoff career-high 16 assists in a 130–117 loss to the Miami Heat. In Game 2 of the Bucks' first-round playoff series, Holiday had 24 points, five rebounds, and 11 assists in a 138–122 victory, tying the series at one game apiece. In Game 5, the Bucks were eliminated after their third straight loss to the Heat.

=== Boston Celtics (2023–2025) ===
==== 2023–24: Second NBA championship ====
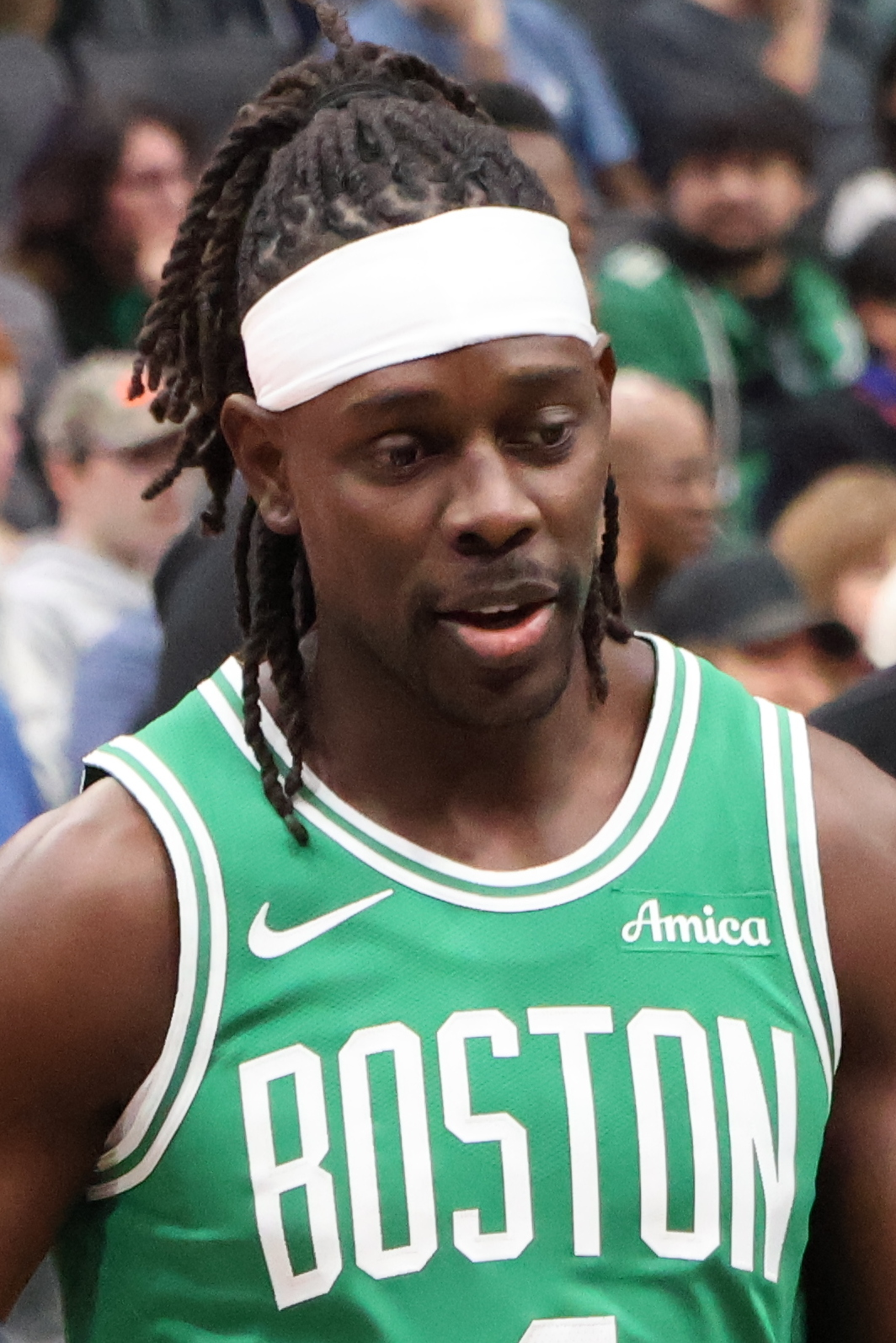
Holiday with Boston Celtics in 2024

On September 27, 2023, Holiday, with Deandre Ayton, Toumani Camara, and a 2029 first-round draft pick, was traded to the Portland Trail Blazers as part of a three-team deal that sent Damian Lillard to the Milwaukee Bucks and Grayson Allen, Jusuf Nurkić, Nassir Little, and Keon Johnson to the Phoenix Suns. Four days later, Holiday was traded to the Boston Celtics for Robert Williams III, Malcolm Brogdon, and two future first-round draft picks.

On April 10, 2024, Holiday agreed to a four-year, $135 million contract extension with the Celtics with $100 million guaranteed. In Game 1 of the Eastern Conference Finals against the Indiana Pacers on May 21, he recorded a season-high 28 points, seven rebounds, eight assists and three steals in a 133–128 overtime victory. After a four-game sweep, the Celtics secured their spot in the 2024 NBA Finals. Holiday also became the first player in NBA history to average at least 18 points, seven rebounds, and five assists with 50-40-100 shooting splits in a conference finals series. In Game 2 of the NBA Finals against the Dallas Mavericks on June 9, he recorded 26 points and 11 rebounds in a 105–98 victory. Holiday became the first guard to produce at least 25 points and 10 rebounds while shooting 75% or better from the floor in an NBA Finals game. The Celtics won the series in five games, earning Holiday his second NBA championship. Along with his championship in Milwaukee, Holiday became the first NBA player to win a ring in his first season with two different franchises.

==== 2024–25: First Social Justice Champion Award and second Sportsmanship Award ====
On May 1, 2025, Holiday received the 2024–2025 Sportsmanship Award. Six days later, he was named the 2024–25 Social Justice Champion.

=== Portland Trail Blazers (2025–present) ===
On July 7, 2025, Holiday was traded to the Portland Trail Blazers in exchange for Anfernee Simons.

On October 29, Holiday recorded 27 points, five rebounds, eight assists, and two steals, leading the Blazers to a 136–134 victory over the Utah Jazz. On March 4, 2026, Holiday posted a season-high 35 points along with 5 rebounds and 11 assists, leading the Blazers to a 122–114 win over the Memphis Grizzlies. On March 6, Holiday had 20 points and 10 assists in a 128–118 loss to the Houston Rockets. During the game, he reached 17,000 career points on a step-back three-pointer. On April 2, Holiday recorded 27 points, five rebounds, and nine assists in a 118–106 win over the New Orleans Pelicans. He joined Stephen Curry, LeBron James, James Harden, and Kevin Durant as the only players aged 35 or older to record 25+ points, 5+ rebounds, and 5+ three-pointers made in back-to-back games. On April 10, Holiday was announced as the 2025–26 recipient of the Maurice Lucas Award.

== National team career ==
Holiday was a member of the USA select team that trained with and against the 2012 national team. In 2013, he participated in the national team minicamp.

He was selected to the national team for the 2020/21 Olympics where USA finished with a 5-1 record and won gold. He started five of six games, averaging 11.8 points, 4.8 rebounds and 3.8 assists. He won his second gold with the national team at the 2024 Olympics where he averaged 7.6 points, 1.6 rebounds and 3.6 assists.

== Career statistics ==
Legend
GP	Games played	GS	Games started	MPG	Minutes per game
FG%	Field goal percentage	3P%	3-point field goal percentage	FT%	Free throw percentage
RPG	Rebounds per game	APG	Assists per game	SPG	Steals per game
BPG	Blocks per game	PPG	Points per game	**Bold**	Career high
†	Won an NBA championship	*	Led the league

=== NBA ===
==== Regular season ====
Year	Team	GP	GS	MPG	FG%	3P%	FT%	RPG	APG	SPG	BPG	PPG
2009–10	Philadelphia	73	51	24.2	.442	.390	.756	2.6	3.8	1.1	.2	8.0
2010–11	Philadelphia	**82**	**82***	35.4	.446	.365	.823	4.0	6.5	1.5	.4	14.0
2011–12	Philadelphia	65	65	33.8	.432	.380	.783	3.3	4.5	**1.6**	.3	13.5
2012–13	Philadelphia	78	78	**37.5**	.431	.368	.752	4.2	**8.0**	**1.6**	.4	17.7
2013–14	New Orleans	34	34	33.6	.447	.390	.810	4.2	7.9	**1.6**	.4	14.3
2014–15	New Orleans	40	37	32.6	.446	.378	.855	3.4	6.9	**1.6**	.6	14.8
2015–16	New Orleans	65	23	28.2	.439	.336	.843	3.0	6.0	1.4	.3	16.8
2016–17	New Orleans	67	61	32.7	.453	.356	.708	3.9	7.3	1.5	.6	15.4
2017–18	New Orleans	81	81	36.1	.494	.337	.786	4.5	6.0	1.5	**.8**	19.0
2018–19	New Orleans	67	67	35.9	.472	.325	.768	5.0	7.7	**1.6**	**.8**	**21.2**
2019–20	New Orleans	61	61	34.7	.455	.353	.709	4.8	6.7	**1.6**	**.8**	19.1
2020–21†	Milwaukee	59	56	32.3	**.503**	.392	.787	4.5	6.1	**1.6**	.6	17.7
2021–22	Milwaukee	67	64	32.9	.501	.411	.761	4.5	6.8	**1.6**	.4	18.3
2022–23	Milwaukee	67	65	32.6	.479	.384	.859	5.1	7.4	1.2	.4	19.3
2023–24†	Boston	69	69	32.8	.480	**.429**	.833	**5.4**	4.8	.9	**.8**	12.5
2024–25	Boston	62	62	30.6	.443	.353	**.909**	4.3	3.9	1.1	.4	11.1
2025–26	Portland	53	51	29.4	.451	.378	.838	4.6	6.1	1.0	.1	16.3
Career		1,090	1,007	32.8	.461	.371	.790	4.2	6.2	1.4	.5	15.9
All-Star		2	0	12.2	.444	.200	–	1.0	1.5	1.0	.0	4.5

==== Playoffs ====
Year	Team	GP	GS	MPG	FG%	3P%	FT%	RPG	APG	SPG	BPG	PPG
2011	Philadelphia	5	5	37.6	.414	**.524**	.800	3.8	5.6	**2.0**	.4	14.2
2012	Philadelphia	13	13	38.0	.413	.408	.864	4.7	5.2	1.5	**.6**	15.8
2015	New Orleans	3	0	18.2	.368	.250	**1.000**	1.0	4.3	.7	.3	6.3
2018	New Orleans	9	9	38.7	**.518**	.320	.700	5.7	6.3	1.1	**.6**	**23.7**
2021†	Milwaukee	**23***	**23***	**39.6**	.406	.303	.714	5.7	**8.7**	1.7	.4	17.3
2022	Milwaukee	12	12	38.6	.379	.316	.839	5.6	6.5	1.8	.6	19.1
2023	Milwaukee	5	5	38.1	.400	.286	.692	**6.6**	8.0	1.0	.4	17.8
2024†	Boston	19	19	37.9	.503	.402	.955	6.1	4.4	1.1	**.6**	13.2
2025	Boston	8	8	33.0	.483	.346	.692	4.1	4.0	.9	.1	9.5
2026	Portland	5	5	38.4	.403	.353	.889	5.4	7.2	1.4	.4	16.4
Career		102	99	37.5	.431	.345	.793	5.3	6.2	1.4	.5	16.0

=== College ===
Year	Team	GP	GS	MPG	FG%	3P%	FT%	RPG	APG	SPG	BPG	PPG
2008–09	UCLA	35	35	27.1	.450	.307	.726	3.8	3.7	1.6	.5	8.5

== Personal life ==
My mom and my mom's sister were on a kick with J names … my cousins' names are Jessica, Jenna, Jade, Jaelyn and James. My oldest brother is Justin and my name is Jrue (my mom liked the name Dru, but wanted to figure out how to keep with the J theme). After me, though, that kinda ended, because my sister is Lauren and brother is Aaron.

— Holiday, on the story behind his first name

Both of Holiday's brothers, Justin and Aaron, have played in the NBA. His younger sister, Lauren, played college basketball on the UCLA women's team.

In July 2013, Holiday married professional soccer player Lauren Cheney. They first met at a UCLA women's basketball game during his only season at the school. While Holiday was approaching his seat, a young girl asked if he was Darren Collison and asked for his autograph. After explaining that he was not Collison and preparing to take his seat, Cheney, who was seated behind him, said, "Don't worry, you're cuter than Darren." At the time, both were in relationships with others, but they became friends, and began dating after Holiday was drafted by the 76ers. They later began hosting annual combo basketball and soccer clinics at UCLA.

In September 2016, Holiday took indefinite leave from the Pelicans to care for Lauren after she was diagnosed with a brain tumor. The following month, Lauren had brain surgery only weeks after giving birth to the couple's daughter, J.T. (Jrue Tyler). They had their second child, a boy named Hendrix, in late 2020.

Holiday is a Christian. He has said, "I'm a Christian athlete who has faith in Jesus Christ. So when I encounter circumstances over which I have no control, I believe and have peace."

In April 2025, it was announced that the Holidays had invested in the North Carolina Courage through the Holiday Family Trust.

== See also ==
- List of NBA career assists leaders
- List of NBA career steals leaders
- List of NBA career turnovers leaders
- List of NBA career 3-point scoring leaders
