= Congressional Black Caucus Foundation =

American educational organization

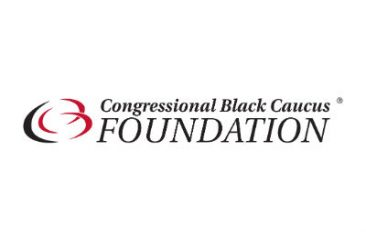
- Formation: 1976
- Type: Nonprofit foundation
- Headquarters: Washington, D.C., United States
- Chairperson: Cedric Richmond
- Key people: President and CEO: Tonya Veasey
- Affiliations: Congressional Black Caucus
- Revenue: $7,016,234 (2016)
- Expenses: $7,312,526 (2016)

The Congressional Black Caucus Foundation (CBCF) is an American educational foundation. It conducts research on issues affecting African Americans, publishes a yearly report on key legislation, and sponsors issue forums, leadership seminars and scholarships. Although linked with the Congressional Black Caucus (CBC), the Congressional Black Caucus Foundation is a separate nonprofit group that runs programs in education, healthcare and economic development.

Established in 1976 by members of the CBC, the CBCF began as a non-partisan research institute.

== History ==
=== Foundation ===
African American members of Congress established the Congressional Black Caucus in 1971. In 1976, the Congressional Black Caucus Foundation was established as a non-partisan research institute by members of the Congressional Black Caucus and others to promote African Americans' involvement in the national political process. The first official meeting of its incorporators was held on September 30, 1976. Yvonne Burke of Los Angeles (not yet a member of Congress) was elected temporary chairman. In 1981, expansion of the group resulted from a change in the House Administration Committee rules governing caucuses.

The first Annual Congressional Black Caucus Dinner was held in 1971, before the creation of the CBCF.

=== 2004–today ===
The New York Times investigated the caucus’s connections to corporate interests and reported that from 2004 to 2008, the Congressional Black Caucus’s political and charitable wings took in at least $55 million in corporate and union contributions.

The caucus says its nonprofit groups are intended to help disadvantaged African Americans by providing scholarships and internships to students, researching policy and holding seminars on topics like healthy living.

In 2008, the Congressional Black Caucus Foundation spent more on the caterer for its signature legislative dinner and conference — nearly $700,000 for an event one organizer called “Hollywood on the Potomac” — than it gave out in scholarships, federal tax records showed.

The Dallas Morning News reported in August 2010 that congresswoman Eddie Bernice Johnson had awarded thousands of dollars in college scholarships to four relatives and a top aide's two children using foundation funds. The recipients were ineligible under anti-nepotism rules of the Congressional Black Caucus Foundation, which provided the money, and all of the awards violated a foundation requirement that scholarship winners live or study in a caucus member's district.

The foundation's former chairman, Rep. Donald Payne, D-N.J., said that neither the foundation nor the Congressional Black Caucus "will allow unethical behavior in the awarding of scholarships or any programs that are designed to benefit the community."

Today, the Foundation is organized as a nonprofit, nonpartisan public policy, research and educational institute with an office located near Dupont Circle in Washington, D.C., as well as a Board of Directors and two Advisory Councils. Cedric Richmond is the Chairperson of CBCF and Elsie L. Scott is its president and Chief Executive Officer.

== Programs ==
Fundraising events and corporate partners support CBCF programs. The CBCF funds many of its activities by hosting an Annual Legislative Conference each September.

Raytheon Technologies funds Defense & Aerospace Policy Fellowships at CBCF.

The Foundation often works with the Congressional Black Caucus Spouses, a group of wives and husbands of the African American members of the United States Congress.

== Phoenix Award ==
The Phoenix Award is the highest honor the group awards. Recipients include Cynthia Hurd.
