= 2021 NBA Finals =

2021 basketball championship series

Team	Coach	Wins
Milwaukee Bucks	Mike Budenholzer	4
Phoenix Suns	Monty Williams	2
- Dates: July 6–20
- MVP: Giannis Antetokounmpo (Milwaukee Bucks)
- Eastern finals: Bucks defeated Hawks, 4–2
- Western finals: Suns defeated Clippers, 4–2

The 2021 NBA Finals was the championship series of the National Basketball Association's (NBA) 2020–21 season and conclusion of the season's playoffs. In this best-of-seven playoff series, the Eastern Conference champion Milwaukee Bucks overcame a two-games-to-none series deficit to defeat the Western Conference champion Phoenix Suns in six games, winning their first NBA championship since 1971 and ending a half-century long championship drought for not just the Bucks, but the city of Milwaukee in general. Holding home-court advantage, the Suns led the series 2–0 before the Bucks won the next four games, becoming the fifth team in NBA history to win the championship after losing the first two games. Milwaukee's Giannis Antetokounmpo was named NBA Finals Most Valuable Player (MVP). With the COVID-19 pandemic altering the NBA's schedule for the second consecutive year, the start date of the series was pushed from its usual time in late May or early June to July 6, the second-latest start in Finals' history. This was the first NBA Finals since 2010 to have neither LeBron James nor Stephen Curry as one of the players competing, the first since 1998 to not feature a team from California, Texas, or Florida, as well as the first Finals since 1984 to not feature a teammate of Shaquille O'Neal.

Milwaukee and Phoenix were two of five teams in the league with an active championship drought of 50 years or more. Prior to 2021, the Bucks won their only title in 1971, while the Suns have yet to win a title since joining the league in 1968. They were both making their third Finals appearance. Phoenix and Milwaukee each began play as expansion teams in 1968. Both teams were involved in a coin toss for the rights to the first overall pick in the 1969 NBA draft, which the Bucks won and used to select Lew Alcindor, later known as Kareem Abdul-Jabbar, from UCLA. He led the Bucks to their first championship in 1971. The 2021 Finals was the first since 1971 to not include any players who had previously won an NBA championship, and the first since 2015 that no players on the winning team had prior NBA Finals experience. The Suns' Jae Crowder was the only player in the series who previously played in the Finals (having made the Finals in 2020 with the Miami Heat), making it just the second time since the first Finals that fewer than two players had previously appeared in the championship series; no players had previously played in the Finals in the 1977 series.

== Background ==
=== Impact of COVID-19 ===
The COVID-19 pandemic impacted the NBA for the second straight year. The regular season was reduced to 72 games for each team, and was held from December 22, 2020, to May 16, 2021. The playoffs started on May 22.

=== Milwaukee Bucks ===
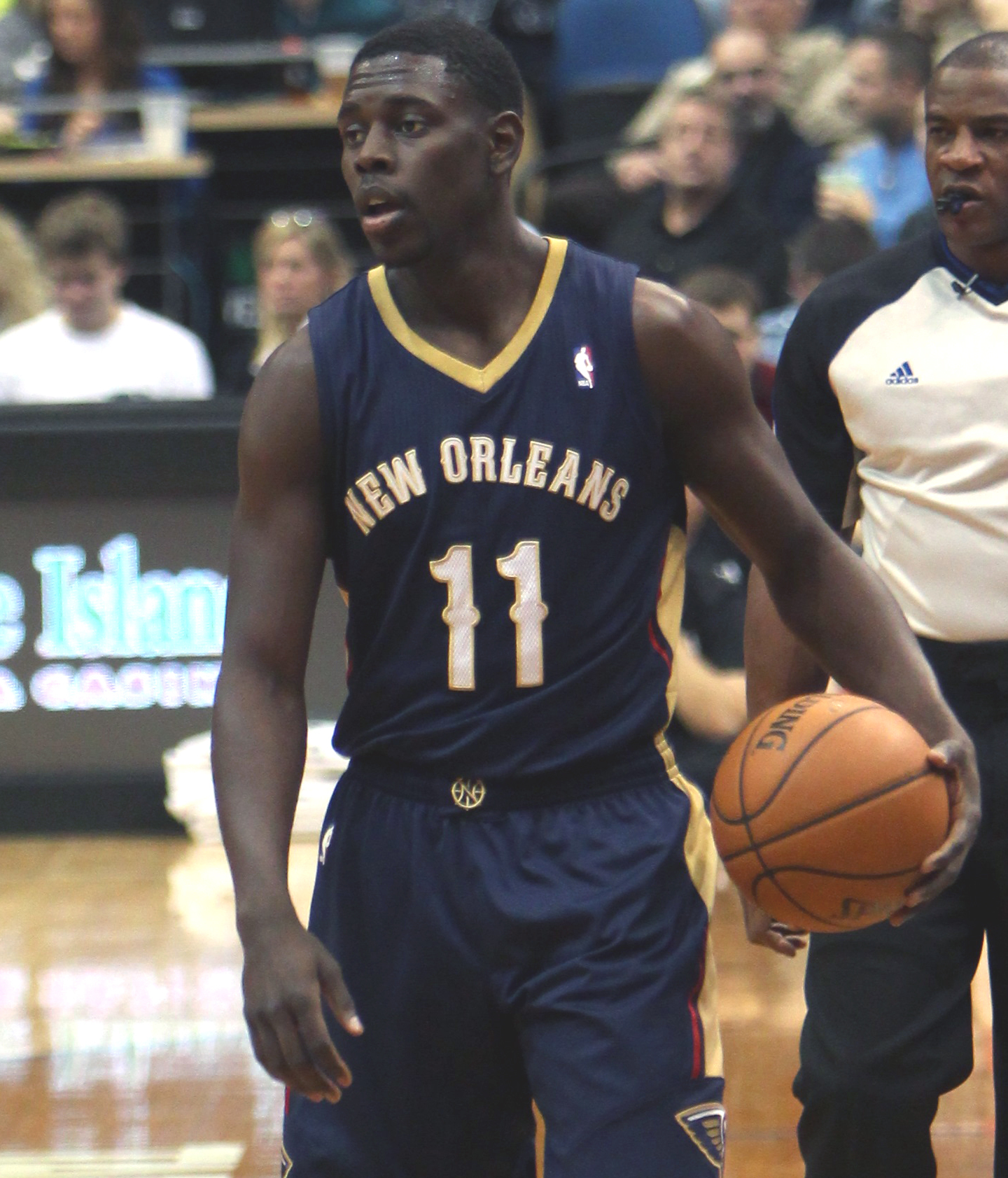
The Bucks acquired Jrue Holiday from the New Orleans Pelicans in the offseason.

The Bucks finished with the league's best record in the prior two seasons before suffering disappointments in the playoffs. In the offseason, they were at risk of losing two-time NBA Most Valuable Player Award-winner Giannis Antetokounmpo in free agency. To improve their roster, the Bucks acquired guard Jrue Holiday, a highly respected defensive player and an All-Star in 2013, from the New Orleans Pelicans in a four-team trade, surrendering a bounty in starting point guard Eric Bledsoe, George Hill, the rights to R. J. Hampton, and a package of future draft picks. Milwaukee later re-signed Antetokounmpo, and had previously re-signed forward Khris Middleton and center Brook Lopez. The team finished the season with a 46–26 record and clinched the 3-seed in the Eastern Conference.

In the first round, the Bucks won in a four-game sweep over sixth-seeded Miami Heat, to whom they had lost in the previous season's conference semifinals in five games. However, Milwaukee lost starting guard Donte DiVincenzo for the season after he tore a ligament in his left ankle in Game 3. A two-way contributor, he was the team's sixth-leading scorer in the regular season, making 38% of his three-point field goals. The Bucks then faced the second-seeded Brooklyn Nets, losing the first two games before winning the series in seven. After taking a 2–1 lead in the conference finals against the fifth-seeded Atlanta Hawks, Antetokounmpo went down in game four with a hyperextension to his left knee, allowing the Hawks to win game four and tie the series. Despite Antetokounmpo's absence, the Bucks were still able to close out the Hawks in six games behind the timely contributions of Lopez, Middleton, and Holiday to reach the Finals for the first time since 1974.

=== Phoenix Suns ===
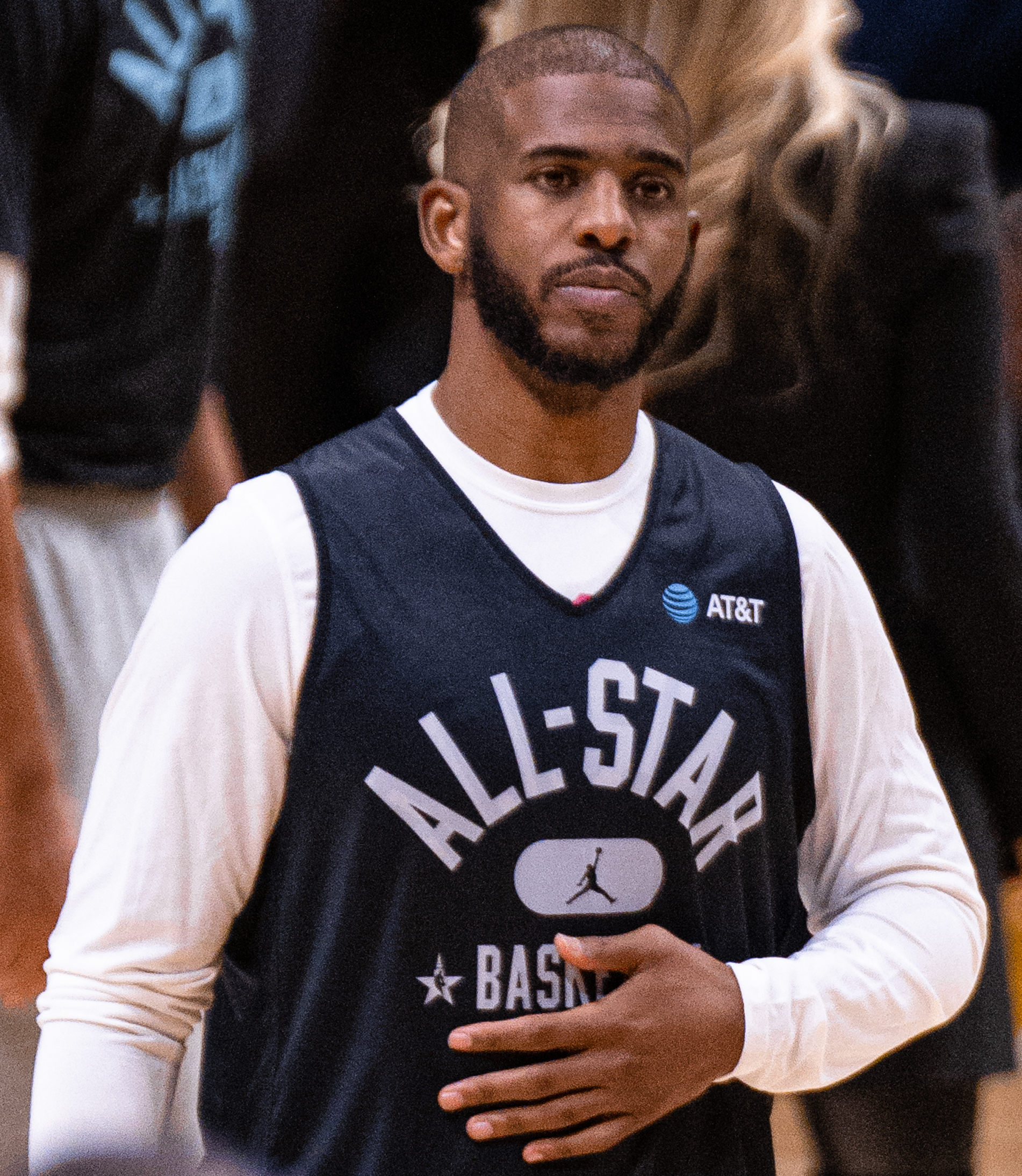
The Suns' Chris Paul, acquired from the Oklahoma City Thunder in the offseason, made his first Finals appearance in 16 seasons.

The Suns had just a .302 winning percentage in the previous five seasons entering the 2020–21 season, which is the worst winning percentage in the five years prior for a team advancing to the final playoff round in any of the four major American professional sports leagues. During the 2020 offseason, Phoenix acquired All-Star Chris Paul from the Oklahoma City Thunder by trading away Ricky Rubio, Kelly Oubre Jr., and a future first-round draft pick. The Suns, led by Paul, rising star Devin Booker, 2018 first overall pick Deandre Ayton, and second-year head coach Monty Williams, finished the season with a 51–21 record as the No. 2 seed, their first winning season since the 2013–14 season, and qualifying for the playoffs for the first time since 2010. They also clinched the Pacific division for the first time since 2006–07.

Phoenix began their playoff run by defeating the seventh-seeded and defending NBA champion Los Angeles Lakers in the opening round in six games. In the conference semifinals, they swept the third-seeded Denver Nuggets. The Suns then defeated Paul's former team, the fourth-seeded Los Angeles Clippers, in the conference finals in six games, advancing to the NBA Finals for the first time since 1993. At 36 years old, Paul made his first Finals appearance after 16 seasons in the league and 10 All-NBA selections.

=== Road to the Finals ===
Milwaukee Bucks (Eastern Conference champion)		Phoenix Suns (Western Conference champion)
Eastern Conference: # / Team / W / L / PCT / GB / GP; 1 / c − Philadelphia 76ers * / 49 / 23 / .681 / – / 72; 2 / x – Brooklyn Nets / 48 / 24 / .667 / 1.0 / 72; 3 / y – Milwaukee Bucks * / 46 / 26 / .639 / 3.0 / 72; 4 / x – New York Knicks / 41 / 31 / .569 / 8.0 / 72; 5 / y – Atlanta Hawks * / 41 / 31 / .569 / 8.0 / 72; 6 / x – Miami Heat / 40 / 32 / .556 / 9.0 / 72; 7 / x – Boston Celtics / 36 / 36 / .500 / 13.0 / 72; 8 / x – Washington Wizards / 34 / 38 / .472 / 15.0 / 72; 9 / pi – Indiana Pacers / 34 / 38 / .472 / 15.0 / 72; 10 / pi – Charlotte Hornets / 33 / 39 / .458 / 16.0 / 72; 11 / Chicago Bulls / 31 / 41 / .431 / 18.0 / 72; 12 / Toronto Raptors / 27 / 45 / .375 / 22.0 / 72; 13 / Cleveland Cavaliers / 22 / 50 / .306 / 27.0 / 72; 14 / Orlando Magic / 21 / 51 / .292 / 28.0 / 72; 15 / Detroit Pistons / 20 / 52 / .278 / 29.0 / 72	Regular season	Western Conference: # / Team / W / L / PCT / GB / GP; 1 / z – Utah Jazz * / 52 / 20 / .722 / – / 72; 2 / y – Phoenix Suns * / 51 / 21 / .708 / 1.0 / 72; 3 / x – Denver Nuggets / 47 / 25 / .653 / 5.0 / 72; 4 / x – Los Angeles Clippers / 47 / 25 / .653 / 5.0 / 72; 5 / y – Dallas Mavericks * / 42 / 30 / .583 / 10.0 / 72; 6 / x – Portland Trail Blazers / 42 / 30 / .583 / 10.0 / 72; 7 / x – Los Angeles Lakers / 42 / 30 / .583 / 10.0 / 72; 8 / pi – Golden State Warriors / 39 / 33 / .542 / 13.0 / 72; 9 / x – Memphis Grizzlies / 38 / 34 / .528 / 14.0 / 72; 10 / pi – San Antonio Spurs / 33 / 39 / .458 / 19.0 / 72; 11 / New Orleans Pelicans / 31 / 41 / .431 / 21.0 / 72; 12 / Sacramento Kings / 31 / 41 / .431 / 21.0 / 72; 13 / Minnesota Timberwolves / 23 / 49 / .319 / 29.0 / 72; 14 / Oklahoma City Thunder / 22 / 50 / .306 / 30.0 / 72; 15 / Houston Rockets / 17 / 55 / .236 / 35.0 / 72
Defeated the 6th seeded Miami Heat, 4–0	First round	Defeated the 7th seeded Los Angeles Lakers, 4–2
Defeated the 2nd seeded Brooklyn Nets, 4–3	Conference semifinals	Defeated the 3rd seeded Denver Nuggets, 4–0
Defeated the 5th seeded Atlanta Hawks, 4–2	Conference finals	Defeated the 4th seeded Los Angeles Clippers, 4–2

=== Regular season series ===
The Suns won the regular season series 2–0, with both wins decided by a single point.

February 10, 2021

Recap

Milwaukee Bucks 124, Phoenix Suns 125

Phoenix Suns Arena, Phoenix, AZ

April 19, 2021

Recap

Phoenix Suns 128, Milwaukee Bucks 127 (OT)

Fiserv Forum, Milwaukee, WI

== Series summary ==
Game	Date	Road team	Result	Home team
Game 1	July 6	Milwaukee Bucks	105–118 (0–1)	Phoenix Suns
Game 2	July 8	Milwaukee Bucks	108–118 (0–2)	Phoenix Suns
Game 3	July 11	Phoenix Suns	100–120 (2–1)	Milwaukee Bucks
Game 4	July 14	Phoenix Suns	103–109 (2–2)	Milwaukee Bucks
Game 5	July 17	Milwaukee Bucks	123–119 (3–2)	Phoenix Suns
Game 6	July 20	Phoenix Suns	98–105 (2–4)	Milwaukee Bucks

== Game summaries ==
Note: Times are EDT (UTC−4) as listed by the NBA. The local time at each game's venue is also given, either Phoenix (MST, UTC−7) or Milwaukee (CDT, UTC−5).

=== Game 1 ===
ABC

July 6
9:00pm (6:00pm MST)

Recap

Milwaukee Bucks 105, Phoenix Suns 118
Scoring by quarter: 26–30, 23–27, 27–35, 29–26
Pts: Khris Middleton 29; Rebs: Giannis Antetokounmpo 17; Asts: Jrue Holiday 9	Pts: Chris Paul 32; Rebs: Deandre Ayton 19; Asts: Chris Paul 9
Phoenix leads series, 1–0

Phoenix Suns Arena, Phoenix, Arizona
Attendance: 16,557
Referees:
- No. 8 Marc Davis
- No. 58 Josh Tiven
- No. 26 Pat Fraher

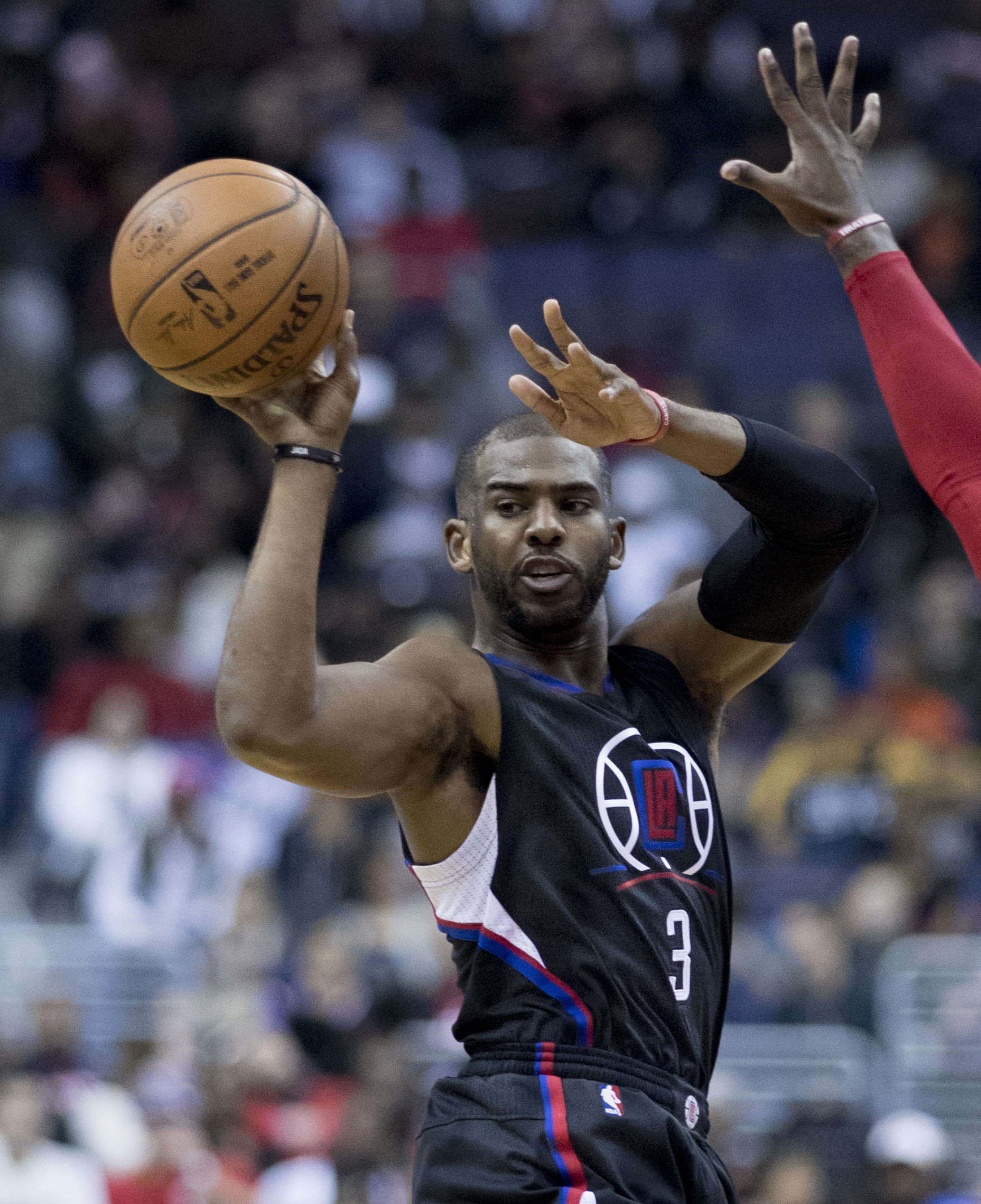
In his finals debut, Chris Paul scored a game-high 32 points, including 16 in the third quarter.

Chris Paul scored 32 points and had nine assists and Devin Booker added 27 points to lead Phoenix to a 118–105 win over Milwaukee. After he opened the third quarter with a jump shot for the first double-digit lead of the game, Paul later scored eight straight points for the Suns and scored 16 overall in the quarter. Phoenix led 88–68 with 2:20 remaining in the quarter after Paul passed to Deandre Ayton, who was fouled and made two free throws. In his return from his knee injury, Bucks star Giannis Antetokounmpo returned and had 20 points, 17 rebounds in limited minutes due to foul trouble, and made a chase-down block of a layup attempt by Mikal Bridges that was reminiscent of "The Block" by LeBron James on Andre Iguodala in Game 7 of the 2016 Finals. Antetokounmpo's availability was not confirmed until almost an hour before tip-off, and he played with few signs of injury.

Milwaukee pulled to within seven points midway through the fourth quarter, but Paul passed to Booker for a 3-pointer and then stole the ball from the Bucks' Khris Middleton and hit a jumper to extend the lead to 106–94. Ayton finished the game with 22 points and 19 rebounds for Phoenix. Middleton scored 29 on 26 shots for the Bucks, but did not attempt a free throw. Teammate Jrue Holiday shot just 4 for 14. Milwaukee center Brook Lopez was targeted on switches by the Suns, and he was on the bench for most of the second half while Antetokounmpo played center.

The Suns had 26 free throw attempts in the game, 10 more than the Bucks. Phoenix made their first 25 free throws and nearly set a record for most free throws in a game without a miss until Jae Crowder missed with 24.8 seconds left in the game. The Suns finished 25 of 26 on their free throws compared to the Bucks' 9 for 16. The loss by the Bucks marked the third straight series in which they trailed. This marked Phoenix' first win at home in the Finals since 1976, and the first time they ever held a series lead in the Finals.

=== Game 2 ===
ABC

July 8
9:00pm (6:00pm MST)

Recap

Milwaukee Bucks 108, Phoenix Suns 118
Scoring by quarter: 29–26, 16–30, 33–32, 30–30
Pts: Giannis Antetokounmpo 42; Rebs: Giannis Antetokounmpo 12; Asts: Khris Middleton 8	Pts: Devin Booker 31; Rebs: Deandre Ayton 11; Asts: Chris Paul 8
Phoenix leads series, 2–0

Phoenix Suns Arena, Phoenix, Arizona
Attendance: 16,583
Referees:
- No. 15 Zach Zarba
- No. 25 Tony Brothers
- No. 4 Sean Wright

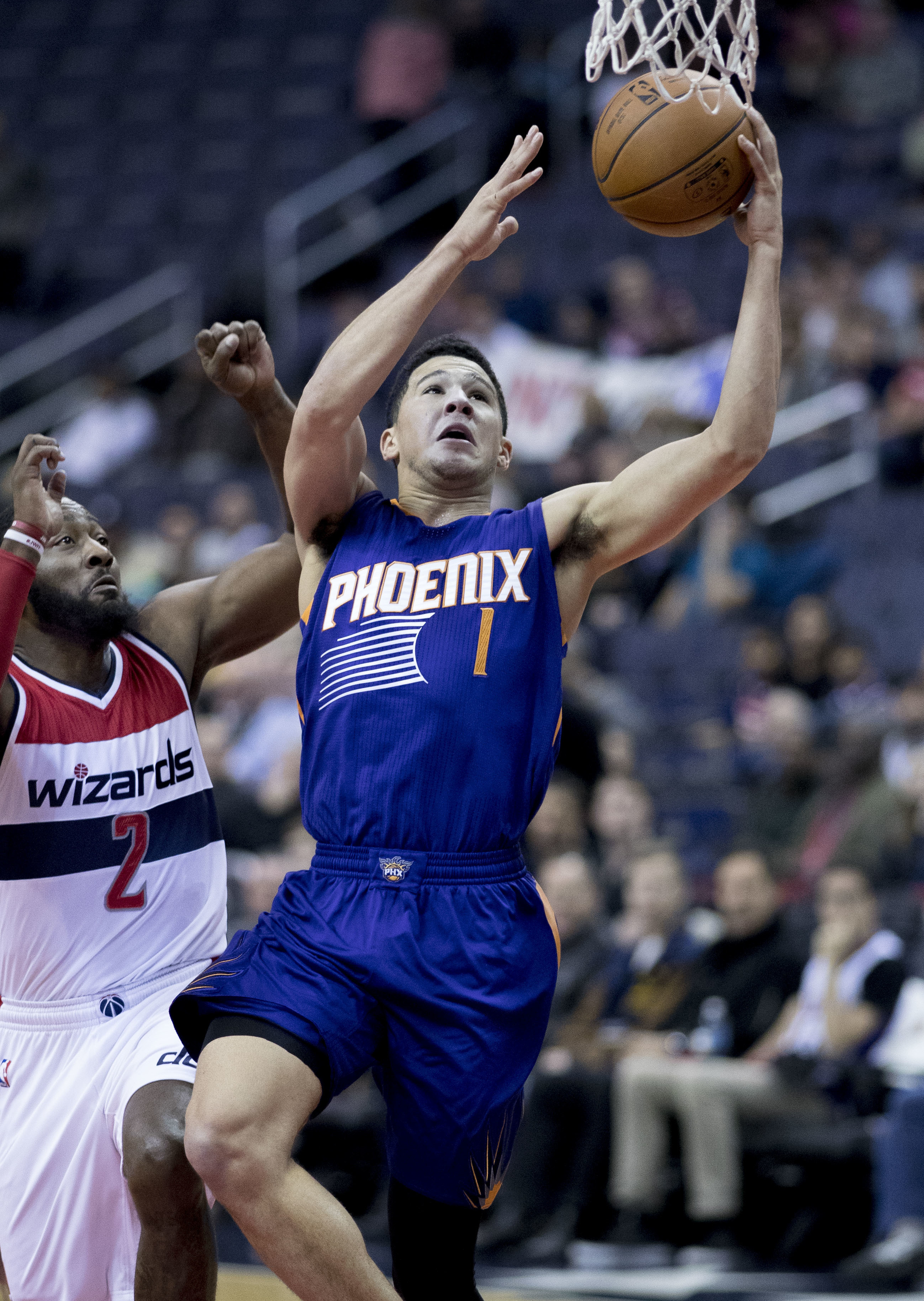
Devin Booker led the Suns with 31 points, including seven three-pointers.

Booker scored 31 points and Paul had 23 as the Suns won 118–108 to take a 2–0 series lead. Phoenix made 20 of its 40 three-pointers, including seven makes from Booker. Bridges added 27 points and seven rebounds for the Suns, and Paul also had eight assists. Antetokounmpo had 42 points and 12 rebounds for Milwaukee. Phoenix was up 65–50 towards the start of the third period, but Antetokounmpo scored 20 points in the quarter, including a stretch of 13 consecutive points for the Bucks, to keep his team in the game.

The Bucks outscored the Suns 20–0 in the key in the opening period, but Phoenix made eight 3-pointers and trailed just 29–26. With less than five minutes remaining in the first half, the game was tied at 41 before Phoenix ended with a 15–4 run. On their last possession, the Suns made 10 passes, with every team member touching the ball, culminating in Bridges passing the ball to Ayton, who laid it in while being fouled. Phoenix weathered Antetokounmpo's 20-point quarter in the third, when he joined Michael Jordan, Isiah Thomas, and Joe Dumars as the other players to score at least 20 in a quarter during a finals game. Milwaukee cut the lead to six in the fourth quarter, but a 3-pointer by Paul and a basket by Bridges expanded the lead back to double figures, and Booker made three of his 3-point shots to fend off the Bucks.

Antetokounmpo had more than twice as many field goals as any other teammate, shooting 15 for 22 from the field, and 11 for 18 from the free-throw line. Holiday scored 17 for Milwaukee on just 7-for-21 shooting, and Middleton had 11 points but was 5 for 16. Crowder bounced back from an 0-for-8 shooting performance in Game 1 with 11 points and 10 rebounds for Phoenix.

=== Game 3 ===
ABC

July 11
8:00pm (7:00pm CDT)

Recap

Phoenix Suns 100, Milwaukee Bucks 120
Scoring by quarter: 28–25, 17–35, 31–38, 24–22
Pts: Chris Paul 19; Rebs: Deandre Ayton 9 Asts: Chris Paul 9	Pts: Giannis Antetokounmpo 41; Rebs: Giannis Antetokounmpo 13; Asts: Jrue Holiday 9
Phoenix leads series, 2–1

Fiserv Forum, Milwaukee, Wisconsin
Attendance: 16,637
Referees:
- No. 48 Scott Foster
- No. 42 Eric Lewis
- No. 60 James Williams

Antetokounmpo had 41 points, 13 rebounds, and six assists, and Milwaukee won 120–100 at home to cut Phoenix's series lead to 2–1. He received more support from his teammates in Game 3. Holiday scored 21 points and was 5 of 10 on 3-pointers, and Middleton scored 18. The Suns got 19 points and nine assists from Paul, but his fellow guard Booker was limited to 10 points on 3-of-14 shooting, as the Bucks sent multiple defenders at him.

The Suns started the game strongly with Ayton scoring 12 points in the first quarter. However, he was limited by foul trouble the rest of the game. Milwaukee took control of the contest with a 30–9 run to end the first half and a 16–0 finish to the third quarter. The Suns pulled to within 74–70 in the third after outscoring the Bucks 14–5, but Milwaukee closed out the quarter with a 24–6 scoring run to lead 98–76. The Bucks were 14 of 36 from three-point range for the game after making just 5 of 18 in the first half. They limited Phoenix to just nine 3-pointers, though Crowder was 6-of-7 from behind the arc and scored 18 points. The Bucks also outscored the Suns 54–40 in the paint, and all 14 of Antetokounmpo's field goals were within 5 feet (1.5 m) of the basket.

Antetokounmpo became the second player to have consecutive Finals games with at least 40 points and 10 rebounds, joining Shaquille O'Neal in 2000. He also posted his 11th game in the playoffs with at least 30 points and 10 rebounds, passing Kareem Abdul-Jabbar's team mark set in 1974 for most in one postseason. Antetokounmpo was an improved 13 of 17 on his free throws, as Bucks fans chanted "M-V-P", compared to fans on the road mocking him with a sped-up timer count, as his lengthy deliberate free throw routine could take longer than the league's 10-second rule to shoot which would result in a violation.

=== Game 4 ===
ABC

July 14
9:00pm (8:00pm CDT)

Recap

Phoenix Suns 103, Milwaukee Bucks 109
Scoring by quarter: 23–20, 29–32, 30–24, 21–33
Pts: Devin Booker 42; Rebs: Deandre Ayton 17; Asts: Chris Paul 7	Pts: Khris Middleton 40; Rebs: Giannis Antetokounmpo 14; Asts: Giannis Antetokounmpo 8
Series tied, 2–2

Fiserv Forum, Milwaukee, Wisconsin
Attendance: 16,911
Referees:
- No. 19 James Capers
- No. 16 David Guthrie
- No. 61 Courtney Kirkland

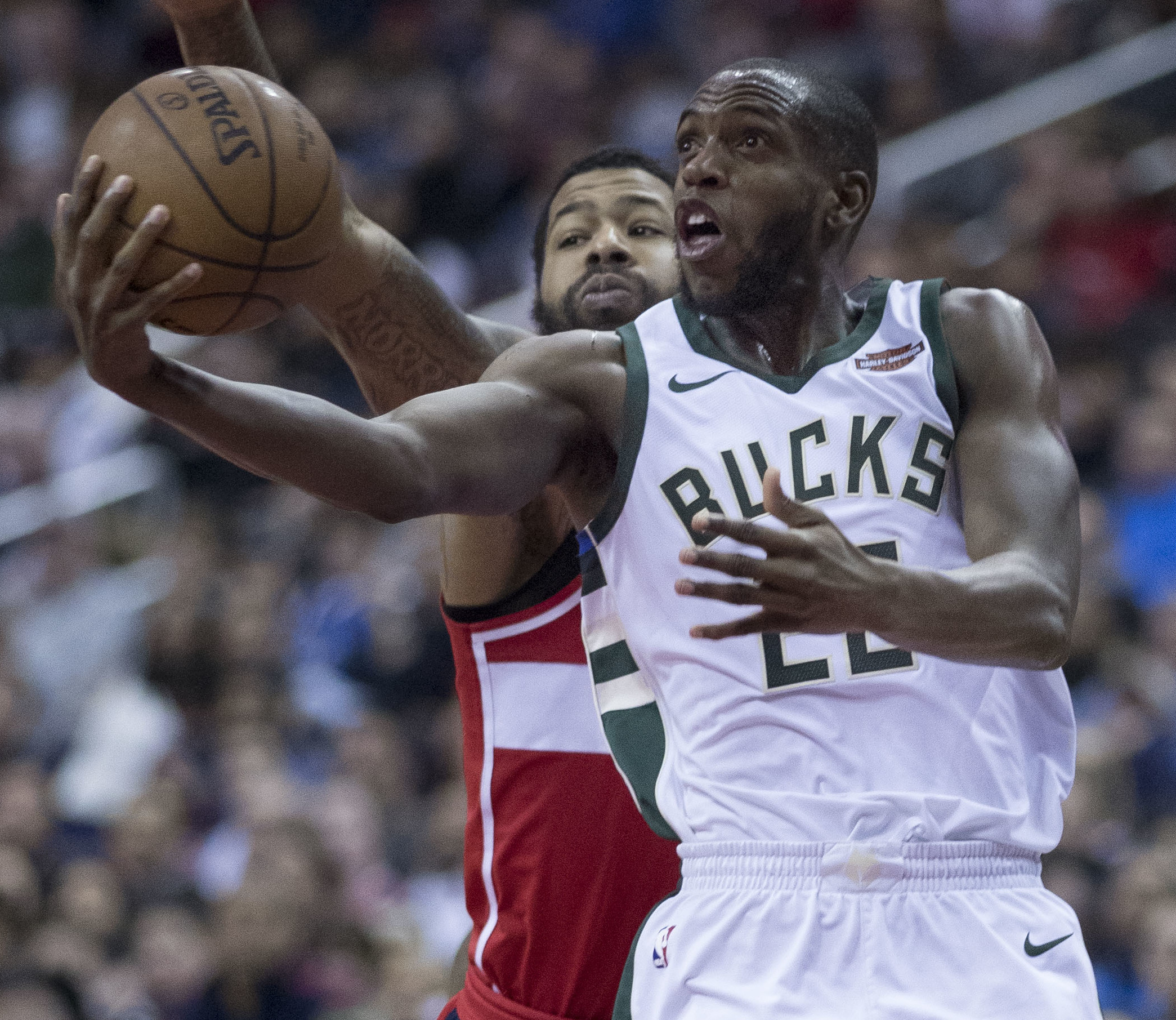
Khris Middleton scored 40 points, including 10 straight in the closing minutes of the game.

Middleton scored 40 points, including 10 straight for Milwaukee in the closing moments, and the Bucks won 109–103 to tie the series 2–2. Booker rebounded from his Game 3 struggles to score a game-high 42 points, but his playing time was restricted late by foul trouble. The Suns led for 37:55 of the first 44 minutes of the game. With 3:42 left in the fourth and the Suns up by three Jrue Holiday attempted a layup and received a great deal of contact from Devin Booker with no call (the play was determined to be a foul by the NBA in the Last 3:30 Report after the game). If Devin Booker had received the foul, it would have been his sixth, resulting in him being ejected and hugely affecting the game. This sparked a lot of controversy online, with the decision to not call the foul being criticised by fans and sports media. They were up two with 2 1/2 minutes remaining when Middleton scored the next eight points in the contest. He made consecutive midrange jump shots to place Milwaukee up for good at 101–99 with 1:28 in the game. Jumping off the left leg that he hyperextended two weeks earlier, Antetokounmpo blocked a potential game-tying alley-oop by Ayton with 1:14 left, prompting fans and media to debate the play's standing among the greatest blocks of all time. After Paul lost his balance of his own accord and turned over the ball, Holiday picked up the loose ball and Middleton made a fast-break layup and with 27.2 seconds left for a four-point lead. He capped off his run with four free throws to bring the score to 107–101. The Bucks outscored the Suns 33–21 in the fourth quarter. Antetokounmpo finished with 26 points along with 14 rebounds and eight assists.

Phoenix made 51.3% of their shots compared to Milwaukee's 40.2%, but they took 19 fewer shots (78–97) due to turnovers and offensive rebounds, outperformed by the Bucks 17–5 in both. The Bucks scored 24 points off turnovers, and their offensive boards led to 19 second-chance points. Crowder scored 15 points for Phoenix, while Paul was held to 10 points on 5–13 shooting and committed five turnovers. Holiday scored 13 on just 4 for 20 shooting, but he added seven rebounds, seven assists and only one turnover, while his defense disrupted Paul. The Bucks also got 14 points from Lopez and 11 points and nine rebounds from Pat Connaughton. Middleton and Antetokounmpo became the third set of teammates to score 40 or more points in games in the same Finals series, joining Abdul-Jabbar and Magic Johnson with the Los Angeles Lakers (1980) and LeBron James and Kyrie Irving while with the Cleveland Cavaliers (2016).

=== Game 5 ===
ABC

July 17
9:00pm (6:00pm MST)

Recap

Milwaukee Bucks 123, Phoenix Suns 119
Scoring by quarter: 21–37, 43–24, 36–29, 23–29
Pts: Giannis Antetokounmpo 32; Rebs: Giannis Antetokounmpo 9 Asts: Jrue Holiday 13	Pts: Devin Booker 40; Rebs: Deandre Ayton 10; Asts: Chris Paul 11
Milwaukee leads series, 3–2

Footprint Center, Phoenix, Arizona
Attendance: 16,562
Referees:
- No. 8 Marc Davis
- No. 58 Josh Tiven
- No. 60 James Williams

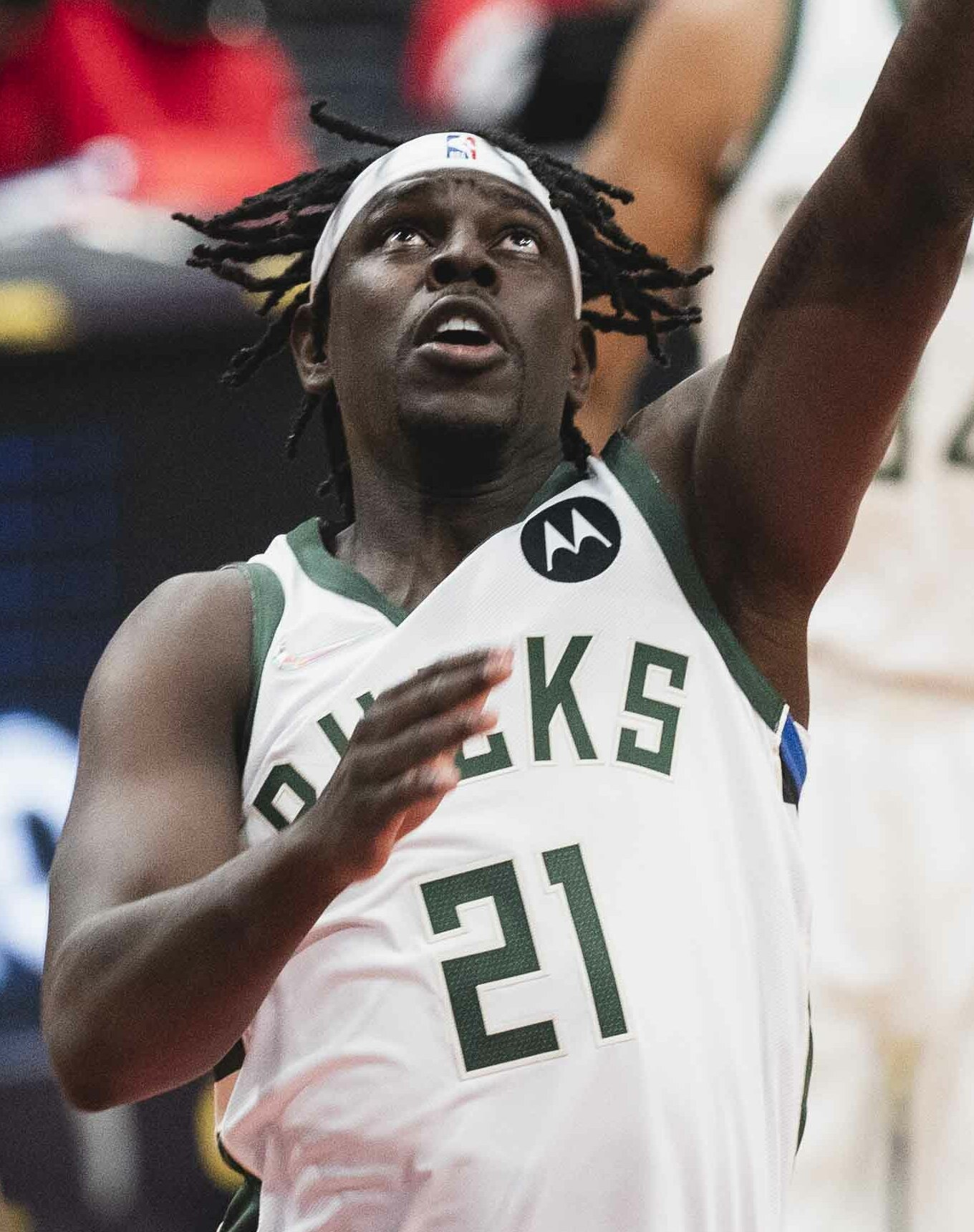
With about 16 seconds remaining, Jrue Holiday stole the ball from Devin Booker and passed it to Giannis Antetokounmpo for an alley-oop. The Bucks won 123–119.

A day before the start of Game 5, the formerly tentatively named Phoenix Suns Arena would officially receive the new name of the Footprint Center, which went into effect in time for Game 5 of the NBA Finals to begin. With Milwaukee leading by one with about 16 seconds remaining in the game, Holiday stole the ball from Phoenix's Booker and passed to Antetokounmpo for an alley-oop and a free throw (fouled by Paul on the finish) to secure the game for a 123–119 Bucks' win and a 3–2 series lead. Milwaukee recovered from an early 16-point deficit to outscore Phoenix 87–57 from the start of the second quarter to around the nine-minute mark of the fourth quarter. The Suns were down 10 with 3 1/2 minutes left in the game before a basket by Paul cut it to 120–119 with 56 seconds to play. Holiday had 27 points, 13 assists and three steals. Antetokounmpo had 32 points, nine rebounds, and six assists, and Middleton finished with 29 points. Booker had a game-high 40 points, his second-straight contest with at least 40.

Phoenix made 14 of 19 shots in the first quarter, including a stretch of 11 straight makes, and led 37–21 after the first period. However, Milwaukee outscored them 21–5 to open the second quarter, tying the game at 42 on a 3-pointer by Connaughton with 7:48 left in the half. Holiday scored 14 in the quarter, when the Bucks scored a record 43 points in a quarter by a road team in the Finals, and they led 64–61 at halftime. After three quarters, the Bucks had made 62.1% of their shots, rivaling Orlando's single-game Finals record of 62.5% in Game 3 of the 2009 finals against the Lakers. Milwaukee led 108–94 after a basket by Holiday with about nine minutes remaining in the game, but the Suns mounted their comeback to pull within one in the final minute. After a Holiday miss, Booker rebounded the ball and dribbled it upcourt himself. He stopped and pivoted in the paint, when Holiday forcefully pulled the ball from his hands for the steal. After initially intending to run down the clock, Holiday instead passed it for the dunk by Antetokounmpo, who was begging for the ball. Fouled on the play by Paul, Antetokounmpo missed the free throw, making just 4 of 11 in the game. However, he volleyed the ball for an offensive rebound by Middleton, who made one of two free throws for the final score of the game.

Milwaukee became the first team in the series to win on the road. Antetokounmpo, Holiday, and Middleton combined for 88 points, becoming the fifth trio to each score 25 points on 50% shooting in a single Finals game, and the first to accomplish the feat since the Lakers' Abdul-Jabbar (36 points), James Worthy (33), and Magic Johnson (26) in 1985. Phoenix lost three straight games for only the second time in the season, the first occurring six months earlier. Paul ended the game with 21 points, 11 assists and one turnover, while Ayton finished with 20 points and 10 rebounds. Booker became the first player in the Finals to score at least 40 in consecutive games and lose both. Antetokounmpo and he were the first pair of players to score 40+ twice in the same Finals. Bucks' role player Thanasis Antetokounmpo, the older brother of Giannis, and assistant coach Josh Oppenheimer were away from the team due to COVID-19 health and safety protocols. The NBA also replaced referee Sean Wright after he entered health and safety protocols.

=== Game 6 ===
ABC

July 20
9:00pm (8:00pm CDT)

Recap

Phoenix Suns 98, Milwaukee Bucks 105
Scoring by quarter: 16–29, 31–13, 30–35, 21–28
Pts: Chris Paul 26; Rebs: Jae Crowder 13; Asts: Booker, Paul 5 each	Pts: Giannis Antetokounmpo 50; Rebs: Giannis Antetokounmpo 14; Asts: Jrue Holiday 11
Milwaukee wins NBA Finals, 4–2

Fiserv Forum, Milwaukee, Wisconsin
Attendance: 17,397
Referees:
- No. 48 Scott Foster
- No. 42 Eric Lewis
- No. 25 Tony Brothers

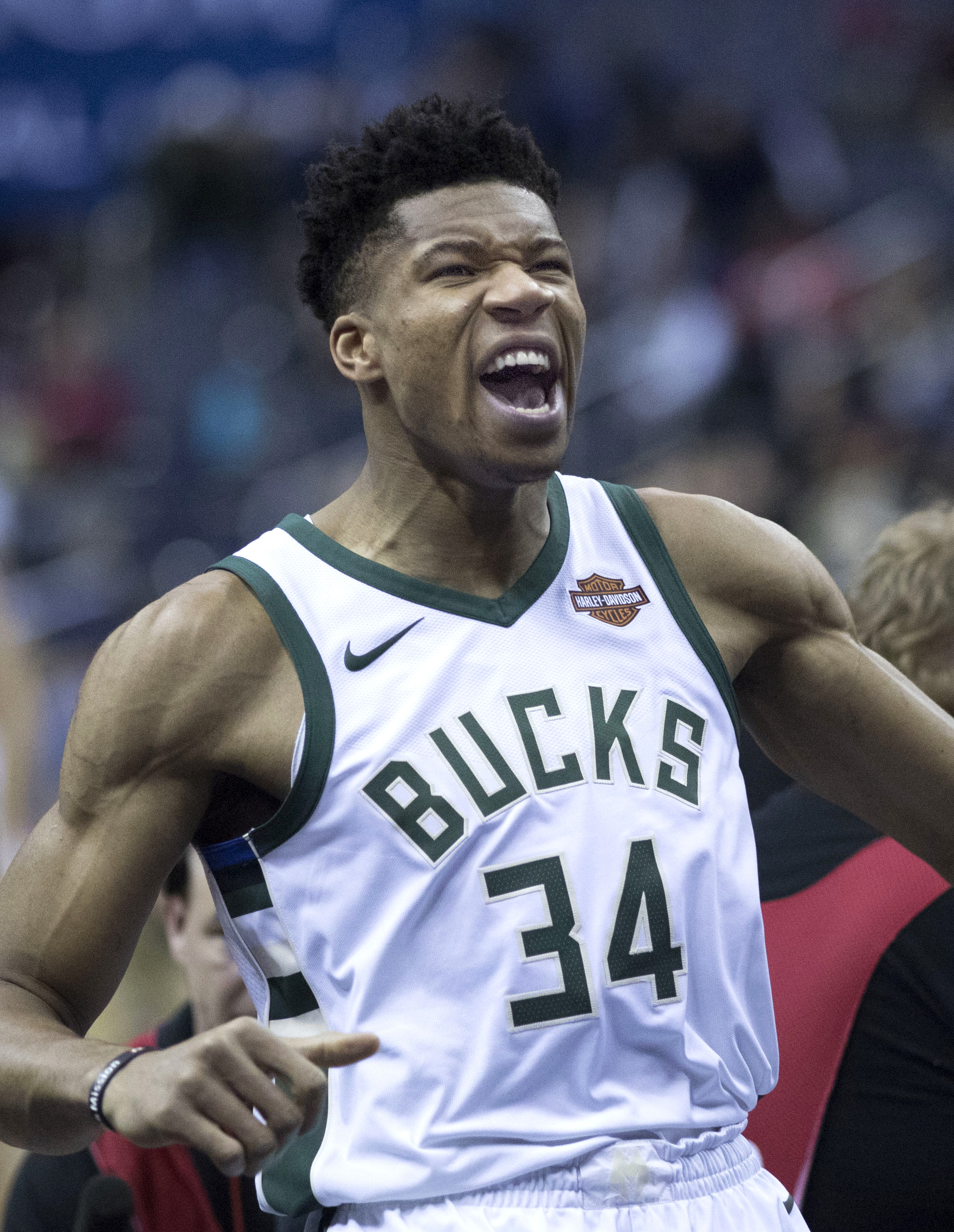
Giannis Antetokounmpo was named the Finals MVP, scoring 50 points in Game 6.

Giannis Antetokounmpo scored a playoff career-high 50 points and added 14 rebounds and five blocks to lead the Bucks to a 105–98 victory to win the series in six games. The 50 points tied a Finals record for the most scored by a player in a series-clinching game, set by Bob Pettit of the St. Louis Hawks in 1958. After his dominant performance in the series, including his third game with at least 40 points and 10 rebounds, Antetokounmpo was named the Finals MVP, the youngest winner at age 26 since Kawhi Leonard (22) in 2014. Antetokounmpo made 16 of his 25 shots, and was a surprising 17 for 19 on his free throws after hitting just 55.6% in the playoffs. The game was tied at 77 after three quarters before he scored 13 in the final period to lead Milwaukee to its first championship since 1971, when they were led by Abdul-Jabbar and Oscar Robertson. Paul led the Suns with 26 points.

Middleton scored 17 and reserve Bobby Portis added 16 for the Bucks. Holiday had 12 points, 11 assists, and nine rebounds. His defense helped limit Booker to 19 points on just 8-for-22 shooting, missing all seven of his 3-point attempts. Milwaukee became the fifth team (after the 1969 Boston Celtics, 1977 Portland Trail Blazers, 2006 Miami Heat, and 2016 Cleveland Cavaliers) to come back from a 2–0 deficit in the Finals, and the first to do so by winning the next four games since Miami defeated Dallas in 2006. They also became the second team in NBA history to come back from down 2–0 twice in the same playoffs after the 2020–21 Los Angeles Clippers also did so in consecutive rounds. The Suns have won two games in each of their three Finals appearances. Paul became the first player in NBA playoff history to lose four series in which his team led 2–0.

== Rosters ==
=== Milwaukee Bucks ===
2020–21 Milwaukee Bucks roster
Players

Pos.	No.	Player	Height	Weight	DOB	From
F	34	Giannis Antetokounmpo	6 ft 11 in (2.11 m)	242 lb (110 kg)	1994-12-06	Greece
F	43	Thanasis Antetokounmpo	6 ft 6 in (1.98 m)	219 lb (99 kg)	1992-07-18	Greece
G	3	Elijah Bryant	6 ft 5 in (1.96 m)	210 lb (95 kg)	1995-04-19	BYU
G	24	Pat Connaughton	6 ft 5 in (1.96 m)	209 lb (95 kg)	1993-01-06	Notre Dame
F	25	Mamadi Diakite	6 ft 9 in (2.06 m)	228 lb (103 kg)	1997-01-21	Virginia
G	0	Donte DiVincenzo	6 ft 4 in (1.93 m)	203 lb (92 kg)	1997-01-31	Villanova
G	7	Bryn Forbes	6 ft 2 in (1.88 m)	205 lb (93 kg)	1993-07-23	Michigan State
G	21	Jrue Holiday	6 ft 3 in (1.91 m)	205 lb (93 kg)	1990-06-12	UCLA
F	44	Justin Jackson (TW)	6 ft 8 in (2.03 m)	220 lb (100 kg)	1995-03-28	North Carolina
C	11	Brook Lopez	7 ft 0 in (2.13 m)	282 lb (128 kg)	1988-04-01	Stanford
G	15	Sam Merrill	6 ft 4 in (1.93 m)	205 lb (93 kg)	1996-05-15	Utah State
F	22	Khris Middleton	6 ft 7 in (2.01 m)	222 lb (101 kg)	1991-08-12	Texas A&M
F	13	Jordan Nwora	6 ft 8 in (2.03 m)	225 lb (102 kg)	1998-09-09	Louisville
F	9	Bobby Portis	6 ft 10 in (2.08 m)	250 lb (113 kg)	1995-02-10	Arkansas
G	5	Jeff Teague	6 ft 3 in (1.91 m)	195 lb (88 kg)	1988-06-10	Wake Forest
G/F	66	Axel Toupane (TW)	6 ft 7 in (2.01 m)	210 lb (95 kg)	1992-07-23	France
F	17	P. J. Tucker	6 ft 5 in (1.96 m)	245 lb (111 kg)	1985-05-05	Texas

Coaches
Head coach
- Mike Budenholzer
Assistant(s)
- Vin Baker
- Mike Dunlap
- Chad Forcier
- Darvin Ham
- Charles Lee
- Josh Oppenheimer
- Patrick St. Andrews
- Ben Sullivan

Legend
- (DP) Unsigned draft pick
- (FA) Free agent
- (S) Suspended
- (GL) On assignment to G League affiliate
- (TW) Two-way affiliate player
- Injured

Roster
Updated: May 13, 2021

=== Phoenix Suns ===
2020–21 Phoenix Suns roster
Players

Pos.	No.	Player	Height	Weight	DOB	From
G	0	Ty-Shon Alexander (TW)	6 ft 3 in (1.91 m)	195 lb (88 kg)	1998-07-16	Creighton
C	22	Deandre Ayton	6 ft 11 in (2.11 m)	250 lb (113 kg)	1998-07-23	Arizona
G	1	Devin Booker	6 ft 5 in (1.96 m)	206 lb (93 kg)	1996-10-30	Kentucky
F	25	Mikal Bridges	6 ft 6 in (1.98 m)	209 lb (95 kg)	1996-08-30	Villanova
G	4	Jevon Carter	6 ft 1 in (1.85 m)	200 lb (91 kg)	1995-09-14	West Virginia
F	12	Torrey Craig	6 ft 7 in (2.01 m)	221 lb (100 kg)	1990-12-19	USC Upstate
F	99	Jae Crowder	6 ft 6 in (1.98 m)	235 lb (107 kg)	1990-07-06	Marquette
G	2	Langston Galloway	6 ft 1 in (1.85 m)	200 lb (91 kg)	1991-12-09	Saint Joseph's
F	23	Cameron Johnson	6 ft 8 in (2.03 m)	210 lb (95 kg)	1996-03-03	North Carolina
F/C	8	Frank Kaminsky	7 ft 0 in (2.13 m)	240 lb (109 kg)	1993-04-04	Wisconsin
G	55	E'Twaun Moore	6 ft 3 in (1.91 m)	191 lb (87 kg)	1989-02-25	Purdue
F	11	Abdel Nader	6 ft 5 in (1.96 m)	225 lb (102 kg)	1993-09-25	Iowa State
G	3	Chris Paul	6 ft 0 in (1.83 m)	175 lb (79 kg)	1985-05-06	Wake Forest
G	15	Cameron Payne	6 ft 1 in (1.85 m)	183 lb (83 kg)	1994-08-08	Murray State
F/C	20	Dario Šarić	6 ft 10 in (2.08 m)	225 lb (102 kg)	1994-04-08	Croatia
F/C	10	Jalen Smith	6 ft 10 in (2.08 m)	215 lb (98 kg)	2000-03-16	Maryland

Coaches
Head coach
- Monty Williams
Assistant(s)
- Randy Ayers
- Mark Bryant
- Willie Green
- Brian Randle
- Kevin Young

Legend
- (DP) Unsigned draft pick
- (FA) Free agent
- (S) Suspended
- (GL) On assignment to G League affiliate
- (TW) Two-way affiliate player
- Injured

Roster
Updated: March 18, 2021

== Player statistics ==
Legend
GP	Games played	GS	Games started	MPG	Minutes per game
FG%	Field-goal percentage	3P%	3-point field-goal percentage	FT%	Free-throw percentage
RPG	Rebounds per game	APG	Assists per game	SPG	Steals per game
BPG	Blocks per game	PPG	Points per game

Phoenix Suns statistics
Player	GP	GS	MPG	FG%	3P%	FT%	RPG	APG	SPG	BPG	PPG
Devin Booker	6	6	**40.2**	.455	.268	.875	3.5	4.0	0.8	0.3	**28.2**
Chris Paul	6	6	37.3	.550	**.522**	.750	2.7	**8.2**	0.7	0.2	21.8
Deandre Ayton	6	6	37.5	.531	.000	.909	**12.0**	1.8	1.5	**1.5**	14.7
Mikal Bridges	6	6	32.0	.531	.429	.917	4.2	1.2	1.0	0.5	12.0
Jae Crowder	6	6	37.2	.412	.410	.857	8.5	1.7	**1.7**	1.0	11.7
Cameron Johnson	6	0	22.7	.486	.435	**1.000**	3.2	0.8	0.5	0.5	8.5
Cameron Payne	6	0	15.7	.463	.357	.500	2.5	1.7	0.7	0.0	7.3
Frank Kaminsky	4	0	7.3	.667	.000	.000	1.5	0.8	0.3	0.0	3.0
Torrey Craig	6	0	10.7	.400	.300	.500	1.3	0.2	0.0	0.0	2.8
Ty-Shon Alexander	1	0	1.0	**1.000**	.000	.000	0.0	0.0	0.0	0.0	2.0
Abdel Nader	2	0	4.0	.000	.000	.000	0.0	0.0	0.0	0.0	0.0
Dario Šarić	1	0	2.0	.000	.000	.000	1.0	0.0	0.0	0.0	0.0

Milwaukee Bucks statistics
Player	GP	GS	MPG	FG%	3P%	FT%	RPG	APG	SPG	BPG	PPG
Giannis Antetokounmpo	6	6	39.8	.618	.200	.659	**13.2**	5.0	1.2	**1.8**	**35.2**
Khris Middleton	6	6	**42.5**	.448	.356	.889	6.3	5.3	1.5	0.0	24.0
Jrue Holiday	6	6	41.7	.361	.314	.917	6.2	**9.3**	**2.2**	0.7	16.7
Brook Lopez	6	6	24.5	.483	.238	.800	5.3	0.2	0.7	0.7	11.5
P. J. Tucker	6	6	31.3	.500	.500	.000	3.8	1.2	1.0	0.0	4.0
Pat Connaughton	6	0	30.0	.475	.441	.500	5.8	1.2	0.2	0.0	9.2
Bobby Portis	6	0	16.7	.425	.438	**1.000**	4.0	0.2	0.7	0.3	7.7
Bryn Forbes	3	0	7.3	.300	.333	.000	0.3	0.0	0.3	0.0	3.0
Jordan Nwora	1	0	1.0	**1.000**	**1.000**	.000	1.0	0.0	0.0	0.0	3.0
Jeff Teague	6	0	9.3	.200	.333	.667	0.8	0.7	0.5	0.0	1.5
Thanasis Antetokounmpo	1	0	2.0	.000	.000	.000	3.0	0.0	0.0	0.0	0.0
Sam Merrill	1	0	1.0	.000	.000	.000	0.0	0.0	0.0	0.0	0.0
Elijah Bryant	1	0	0.0	.000	.000	.000	0.0	0.0	0.0	0.0	0.0

- Bold: team high

== Sponsorship ==
As part of a multiyear partnership since 2018, the internet television service YouTube TV was the presenting sponsor of the NBA Finals. YouTube TV introduced a new multi-platform ad campaign during the series featuring a grandmother using the service to watch NBA games on-demand.

== Media coverage ==
The Finals were televised in the United States by ABC (which included local affiliates KNXV-TV in Phoenix and WISN-TV in Milwaukee) for the 19th consecutive year, and broadcast through ESPN Radio nationally. Each of the games' intro videos were directed by Spike Lee.

As with the previous years, the series was called by Mike Breen on play-by-play with Mark Jackson and Jeff Van Gundy as analysts. Rachel Nichols was originally to be the sideline reporter, but Malika Andrews took over due to a leaked audio of Nichols complaining about the sideline reporter role being assigned to Maria Taylor.

=== Viewership ===
Game	Ratings (American households)	American audience (in millions)	Ref
1	4.5	8.56	
2	5.1	9.38	
3	4.7	9.02	
4	5.3	10.25	
5	4.8	9.55	
6	6.6	12.52	
Avg	5.2	9.91	
