= Khris Middleton =

American basketball player (born 1991)

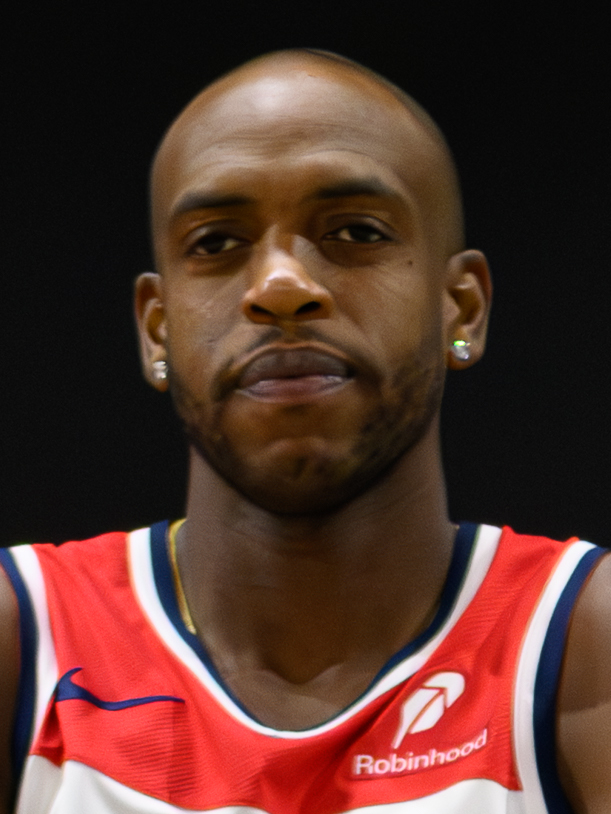
- Middleton in 2025

No. 22 – Washington Wizards
- Position: Small forward
- League: NBA

Personal information
- Born: August 12, 1991 (age 35) Charleston, South Carolina, U.S.
- Listed height: 6 ft 7 in (2.01 m)
- Listed weight: 222 lb (101 kg)

Career information
- High school: Porter-Gaud (Charleston, South Carolina)
- College: Texas A&M (2009–2012)
- NBA draft: 2012: 2nd round, 39th overall pick
- Drafted by: Detroit Pistons
- Playing career: 2012–present

Career history
- 2012–2013: Detroit Pistons
- 2012: →Fort Wayne Mad Ants
- 2013–2025: Milwaukee Bucks
- 2025–2026: Washington Wizards
- 2026: Dallas Mavericks
- 2026–present: Washington Wizards

Career highlights
- NBA champion (2021); NBA Cup champion (2024); 3× NBA All-Star (2019, 2020, 2022); Second-team All-Big 12 (2011)
- Stats at NBA.com
- Stats at Basketball Reference
Medals
Men's basketball
Representing the United States
Olympic Games
Gold medal – first place	2020 Tokyo	Team

James Khristian Middleton (born August 12, 1991) is an American professional basketball player for the Washington Wizards of the National Basketball Association (NBA). He is a three-time NBA All-Star and won an NBA championship with the Milwaukee Bucks and a gold medal with Team USA at the Summer Olympics in 2020.

Middleton attended high school at the Porter-Gaud School in his hometown of Charleston, South Carolina. He played college basketball for the Texas A&M Aggies from 2009 to 2012. He earned second-team All-Big 12 honors after leading the Aggies in scoring with 14.3 points per game during his sophomore season.

Middleton declared for the 2012 NBA draft after his junior season and was selected by the Detroit Pistons with the 39th overall pick. He saw limited action with the Pistons and spent time with the Fort Wayne Mad Ants of the NBA Development League during his rookie season. Middleton was traded to Milwaukee in 2013 and became an immediate contributor to the team. He received his first All-Star selection in 2019. In 2021, Middleton helped lead the Bucks to their first NBA championship since 1971. The same summer, he won a gold medal at the Olympics.

== Early life and high school career ==
Middleton was born on August 12, 1991, in Charleston, South Carolina, to James and Nichelle Middleton. He has one older sister named Brittney, and his cousin, Josh Powell, has played in the NBA. Another cousin, Kenny Manigault, played basketball for Wichita State University and was teammates with Middleton on the Amateur Athletic Union (AAU) team Carolina Celtics. Two other teammates on the Carolina Celtics accepted Division I basketball scholarships, Jamal Curry (Radford) and Devin Booker (Clemson).

Middleton attended Porter-Gaud School and played basketball for the Cyclones under coach John Pearson. As a sophomore, he averaged 12 points and eight rebounds per game. In his junior season, Middleton posted averages of 21 points and 8.6 rebounds per game and was named state player of the year. He repeated as player of the year as a senior, scoring 22.4 points per game and grabbing 8.6 rebounds per game in leading Porter-Gaud to the state title game. Middleton was named Most Valuable Player of the Porter-Gaud Holiday Classic, scoring 22 points in the championship. He was nominated for the 2009 McDonald's All-American Boys Game, but was not selected to participate.

=== Recruiting ===
ESPN ranked him the 64th-best recruit in the Class of 2009, and noted he was the best shooter at his position. Middleton was recruited by Texas A&M, Virginia Tech, South Carolina, Michigan and Saint Joseph's. He chose Texas A&M, and signed with the Aggies on May 30, 2008. He liked the college town atmosphere and got along well with the coaching staff.

College recruiting
Name	Hometown	School	Height	Weight	Commit date
Khris Middleton; SF	Charleston, SC	Porter-Gaud School	6 ft 7 in (2.01 m)	217 lb (98 kg)	May 30, 2008
Khris Middleton; SF	Recruit ratings: Scout: Rivals: (91)				
Overall recruit ranking: Scout: 30 (SF) Rivals: 29 (SF)
Note: In many cases, Scout, Rivals, 247Sports, On3, and ESPN may conflict in their listings of height and weight.; In these cases, the average was taken. ESPN grades are on a 100-point scale.; Sources: "Texas A&M Basketball Commitments". Rivals.; "2009 Texas A&M Basketball Commits". Scout.; "Scout.com Team Recruiting Rankings". Scout.; "2009 Team Ranking". Rivals.

== College career ==
=== Freshman year ===
Middleton was recruited by then-Texas A&M assistant coach Scott Spinelli. Coming into his freshman year, Middleton expected to fill the three-point shooting void of departed senior Josh Carter. Middleton's college career started slowly, connecting on 1-of-12 field goals in limited action of his first three games. After a season-ending leg injury to Derrick Roland on December 11, 2009, Middleton was forced to take a larger role in the offense and started 18 of the last 20 games. On February 3, 2010, he scored 16 points to help Texas A&M erase an 11-point second-half deficit to defeat Missouri 77–74. In a 69–53 NCAA tournament round of 64 victory over Utah State, Middleton scored a season-high 19 points on 7-of-10 shooting. Texas A&M's season ended with a loss in the round of 32 to Purdue; the Aggies finished with a record of 24–10. Overall, Khris Middleton averaged 7.2 points and 3.7 rebounds per game and led the team in scoring five times.

=== Sophomore year ===
As a sophomore, Middleton led the team and finished ninth in the Big 12 in scoring at 14.3 points per game while also contributing 5.2 rebounds per game. He hit 45 percent of his shots from the floor and 78.4 percent of his free throws. Middleton scored in excess of 10 points in 27 games and led the team in scoring 16 times. He scored a career-high 31 points in a 71–62 overtime victory over Arkansas, including 11 of the team's last 12 points in regulation. This earned him Big 12 Player of the Week and Oscar Robertson National Player of the Week honors for the week of December 13–19, 2010. On January 15, 2011, Middleton tallied 28 points, including 11 in overtime, to defeat Missouri 91–89.

Middleton-led Texas A&M went 24–9 and lost in the NCAA Tournament round of 64 to Florida State 57–50, in a contest in which Middleton contributed 16 points. He was selected to the All-Big 12 Second Team at the conclusion of the regular season. The U.S. Basketball Writers Association named Middleton to the 10-man All-District VII team covering college basketball players in the states of Texas, Arkansas and Louisiana. He was recognized as an All-Eighth District second-team selection by the National Association of Basketball Coaches making him eligible for the State Farm Division I All‐America teams. Since the Big 12 Conference was its own district, this is equivalent to being named second team All-Big 12 by the NABC.

=== Junior year ===
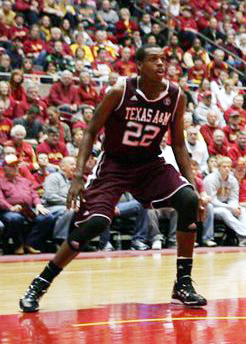
Middleton playing against Iowa State in 2012

Prior to Middleton's junior season, head coach Mark Turgeon left to take the same position at the University of Maryland and was replaced by Billy Kennedy of Murray State. Middleton was impressed with Kennedy's coaching acumen and chose to remain an Aggie. He was listed on the preseason watchlist for the Wooden Award. Middleton was a unanimous choice to the preseason All-Big 12 team.

Despite being the preseason co-favorite in the league, Texas A&M finished 14–18 overall and 4–14 in the Big 12. The team was hampered by a rash of injuries, including a knee injury that forced Middleton to sit for 12 games. He averaged 13.2 points and five rebounds per game, down from the previous season. On April 9, 2012, Middleton declared for the NBA draft, forgoing his final season of collegiate eligibility. He thanked Texas A&M in a statement.

== Professional career ==
=== Detroit Pistons (2012–2013) ===
==== 2012–13 season: Rookie season ====
Middleton was selected by the Detroit Pistons with the 39th overall pick in the 2012 NBA draft. On August 15, 2012, he signed his rookie-scale contract with the Pistons. On December 12, 2012, he was assigned to the Fort Wayne Mad Ants of the NBA Development League (known now as the NBA G League). A week later, he was recalled by the Pistons. He finished his rookie season having managed just 27 games for the Pistons while averaging 6.1 points, 1.9 rebounds and 1.0 assists in 17.6 minutes per game.

=== Milwaukee Bucks (2013–2025) ===
==== 2013–14 season: Sophomore season ====
On July 31, 2013, Middleton was traded, along with Brandon Knight and Viacheslav Kravtsov, to the Milwaukee Bucks in exchange for guard Brandon Jennings. In contrast to his limited action in 2012–13, Middleton played all 82 games in 2013–14, while starting 64 and averaging 12.1 points, 3.8 rebounds, 2.1 assists and 1.0 steals in 30.0 minutes per game. On December 6, 2013, he scored a then-career-high 29 points in a 109–105 win over the Washington Wizards.

==== 2014–15 season: First playoff appearance ====
On December 15, 2014, the Bucks were down by one to the Phoenix Suns with under four seconds remaining in regulation as Middleton hit a contested game-winning buzzer beater to defeat the Suns, 96–94, with Middleton finishing with 14 points. On March 7, 2015, he scored a then-career-high 30 points on 11-of-20 shooting in a 91–85 win over the Washington Wizards. In his second season with the Bucks, Middleton emerged as an important "3-and-D" player, shooting 46.7 percent from the floor and 40.7 percent from behind the three-point arc. He averaged 13.4 points, 4.4 rebounds and 2.3 assists per game.

==== 2015–16 season: New contract ====
On July 9, 2015, Middleton re-signed with the Bucks to a five-year, $70 million contract, with a player option for the fifth year. This constituted a significant pay raise for Middleton, as he earned $915,000 the prior year. On December 29, 2015, in a loss to the Oklahoma City Thunder, he scored a career-high 36 points on 13-of-22 from the field and 6-of-9 from three-point range. On March 4, 2016, in a win over the Minnesota Timberwolves, he scored 32 points on 11-of-16 shooting, including 8-of-9 on threes, marking the most three-point field goals made by a Bucks player since Carlos Delfino had eight on March 18, 2011. He tied his career high of 36 points on April 10, 2016, in a 109–108 overtime win over the Philadelphia 76ers.

==== 2016–17 season: Injury and surgery ====
On September 21, 2016, Middleton was ruled out for six months after sustaining a left hamstring injury in preseason workouts that required surgery. On February 8, 2017, he made his season debut after missing the first 50 games with the hamstring injury, scoring five points in 15 minutes in a 106–88 loss to the Miami Heat. On March 17, 2017, he scored 14 of his season-high 30 points in the fourth quarter of the Bucks' 107–103 win over the Los Angeles Lakers.

==== 2017–18 season: Breakthrough ====
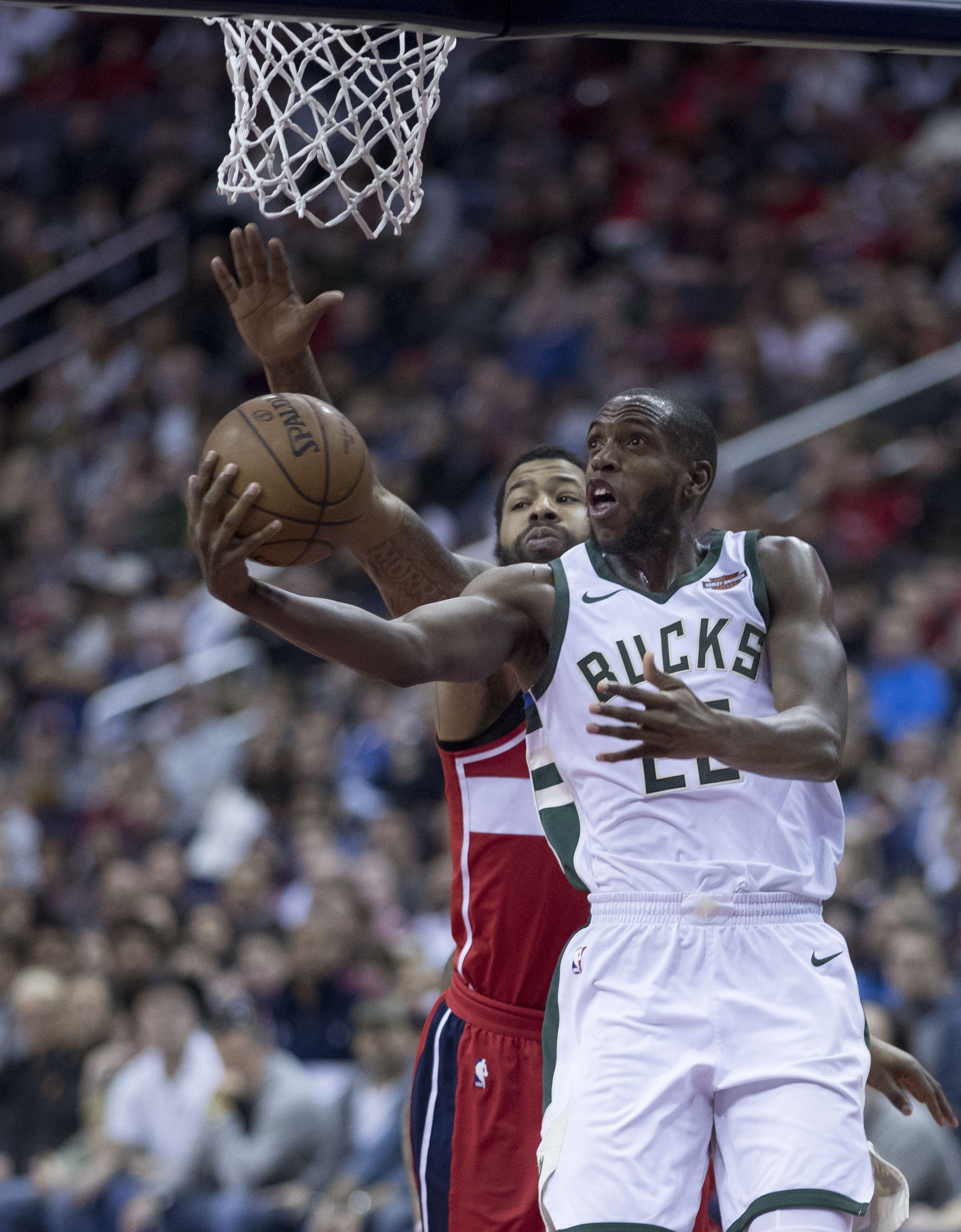
Middleton goes for a layup in 2018.

On November 1, 2017, Middleton scored a then-career-high 43 points in a 126–121 loss to the Charlotte Hornets. On November 22, 2017, he scored 40 points in a 113–107 overtime win over the Phoenix Suns. On January 20, 2018, he had his first career triple-double with 23 points, 14 rebounds and 10 assists in a 116–94 loss to the Philadelphia 76ers. In game 1 of the Bucks' first-round playoff series against the Boston Celtics, Middleton had 31 points, eight rebounds and six assists in a 113–107 overtime loss. The Bucks went on to lose the series in seven games, despite Middleton's 32 points in a 112–96 loss in game 7.

==== 2018–19 season: First All-Star selection ====
On October 22, 2018, Middleton hit 7 of 8 three-pointers and finished with 30 points in a 124–113 win over the New York Knicks. On December 29, despite a quad injury, Middleton scored 29 points in a 129–115 win over the Brooklyn Nets. On January 31, 2019, Middleton was named an Eastern Conference All-Star reserve, thus earning his first All-Star selection. He became the first G League alum to be named an All-Star. On February 21, 2019, he had 15 points and a season-high 13 rebounds in a 98–97 win over the Celtics. On March 28, he scored a season-high 39 points in a 128–118 win over the Los Angeles Clippers.

==== 2019–20 season: Career high in scoring ====
Following the 2018–19 season, Middleton signed a five-year, $178 million contract extension with Milwaukee. On January 28, 2020, Middleton set a new career high, scoring 51 points, making 16-of-26 shots, including 7-of-10 on 3-pointers, in a 151–131 victory over the Washington Wizards. After the game, Middleton dedicated his performance to Kobe Bryant, who died two days prior in a California helicopter crash, saying "I definitely can dedicate that game to him as a thank you for what he did for the game". On January 30, 2020, Middleton was named an Eastern Conference All-Star reserve, thus earning his second consecutive All-Star selection. On February 24, Middleton scored 40 points in a 137–134 overtime win over the Wizards. Middleton missed a game against the Oklahoma City Thunder on February 28 due to neck soreness. In the postseason, Middleton and the Bucks were eliminated in the semi-finals by the eventual Eastern Conference champion Miami Heat in five games. Middleton scored a playoff career-high 36 points, along with 8 rebounds and 8 assists, in the lone Milwaukee victory in game 4.

==== 2020–21 season: Championship season ====
In the following season, Middleton continued to play a key role on the Bucks, averaging 20.4 points per game, a career-high 5.4 assists per game, and 6 rebounds per game during the regular season. That postseason, the Bucks again faced the Heat in the playoffs, this time in the first round. In game 1, Middleton capped off a 27-point, 6-rebound, and 6-assist performance with a game-winning fadeaway jumper with 0.5 seconds left in overtime, to lift Milwaukee to a 109–107 victory and a 1–0 series lead. The Bucks would go on to win the series in four games. In game 6 of the Conference semi-finals against the Brooklyn Nets, Middleton dropped a playoff career-high 38 points, alongside 10 rebounds, five assists and five steals in a 104–89 victory. In game 3 of the Conference Finals against the Atlanta Hawks, Middleton tied his career-high 38 points, alongside 11 rebounds and seven assists in a 113–102 victory. In game 6 of the Conference Finals against the Hawks, Middleton dropped 32 points in a 118–107 win, leading the Bucks to the NBA Finals for the first time since 1974. In game 4 of the Finals, he scored a playoff career-high 40 points to help defeat the Phoenix Suns. In game 6, Middleton recorded 17 points, 5 rebounds and 5 assists, and made crucial baskets in the final minutes of the game to put away the Suns 105–98, closing out the series 4–2, securing the Bucks' first NBA title in fifty years, and giving Middleton his first championship.

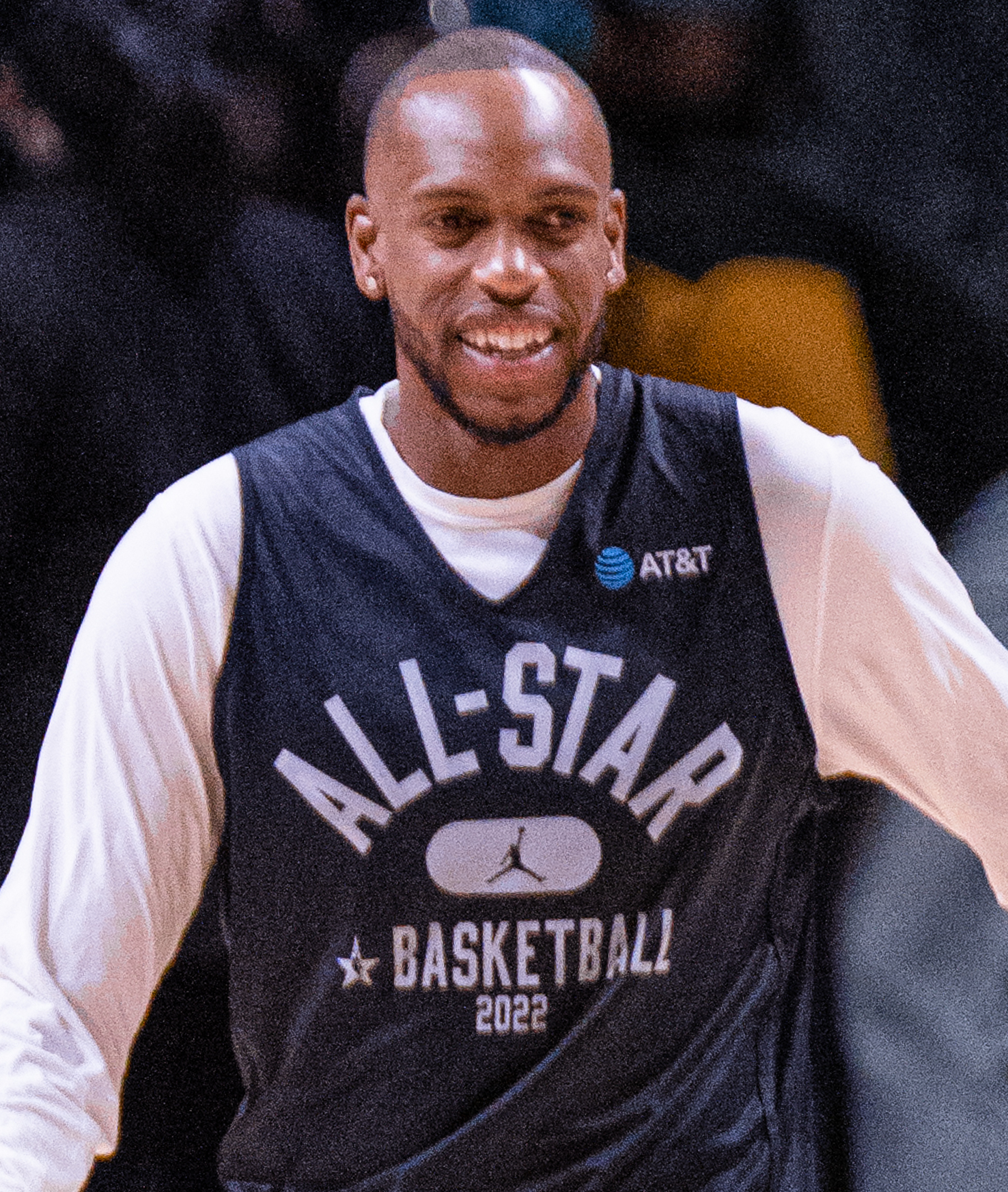
Middleton during the 2022 NBA All-Star Weekend festivities.

==== 2021–22 season: Third All-Star selection ====
In the first game of the 2021–22 NBA season, Middleton scored 20 points and recorded 9 rebounds in a 127–104 blowout win over the Brooklyn Nets. On November 1, Middleton entered the NBA's health and safety protocol after testing positive for COVID-19. Middleton returned to the Bucks as they played the Lakers on November 17 after missing eight games. He scored 16 points and notched 6 assists, tying Ray Allen for the most made three-pointers in Milwaukee Bucks history. In the next game, against the Oklahoma City Thunder on November 19, he passed Allen with his first shot in a 96–89 victory. On December 13, Middleton hyperextended his knee in a loss against the Boston Celtics, and missed the following three games. On January 22, 2022, Middleton led the Bucks to a 133–127 win over the Sacramento Kings with a then-season-high 34 points. On February 3, it was announced that Middleton had been selected as an All-Star for the 2022 NBA All-Star Game. On March 6, Middleton scored a season-high 44 points along with 8 rebounds and 5 assists in a 132–122 win against the Phoenix Suns.

On April 20, in a game 2 loss during Milwaukee's first-round postseason matchup against Chicago, Middleton suffered a medial collateral ligament sprain, which sidelined him for the rest of the playoffs. The Bucks beat the Bulls in five games, but lost the Eastern Conference semi-finals to the Celtics in seven games.

==== 2022–23 season: Comeback ====
On December 3, 2022, Middleton made his return after missing the first twenty games of the 2022–23 season while recovering from off-season wrist surgery, finishing with 17 points and 7 assists during a 133–129 loss to the Los Angeles Lakers. In December and January, Middleton missed eighteen consecutive games due to knee soreness. On February 4, 2023, Middleton recorded 24 points, seven rebounds and four assists in 20 minutes off the bench in a 123–115 win over the Miami Heat. On March 13, Middleton scored a then-season-high 31 points and delivered 9 assists in a 133–124 win over the Sacramento Kings. On March 27, Middleton scored a season-high 34 points, along with eight rebounds and five assists in a 126–117 win over the Detroit Pistons.

On April 16, in the opening game of the playoffs Middleton posted 33 points, nine rebounds and four assists in a 130–117 loss against the Miami Heat. In game 5 of the series, Middleton scored 33 points, along with six rebounds and six assists but despite his effort, the Milwaukee Bucks lost 128–126 in overtime to the Heat.

==== 2023–24 season: Playoff career high in scoring ====
On July 6, 2023, Middleton re-signed with the Bucks to a three-year, $102 million contract. On November 20, Middleton scored 18 points during a 142–129 win over the Washington Wizards, and passed Sidney Moncrief to become the fourth-all-time-leading scorer in Bucks franchise history. On January 22, 2024, Middleton put up 26 points in a 122–113 win over the Detroit Pistons, and passed Glenn Robinson to become the third-all-time-leading scorer in Bucks franchise history. In February and March, Middleton missed 16 games in a row due to an ankle sprain. On March 24, Middleton recorded his second career triple-double, with 11 points, 10 rebounds and 10 assists during a 118–93 win over the Oklahoma City Thunder. On April 26, Middleton recorded a playoff career-best 42 points, while adding 10 rebounds and five assists, during an overtime 121–118 first-round loss to the Indiana Pacers in game 3.

==== 2024–25 season: Surgery and return ====
Over the offseason, Middleton underwent arthroscopic surgeries on both ankles. The left ankle surgery was related to a sprain endured during the February 6 game against the Phoenix Suns, while the right ankle surgery was used as a cleanup related to a lingering issue. Following the surgeries, he was expected to be ready for the season opener. On October 21, it was announced that Middleton would miss the season opener against the Philadelphia 76ers as he continued to rehab from the surgeries. He made his season debut on December 6, 2024, against the Boston Celtics.

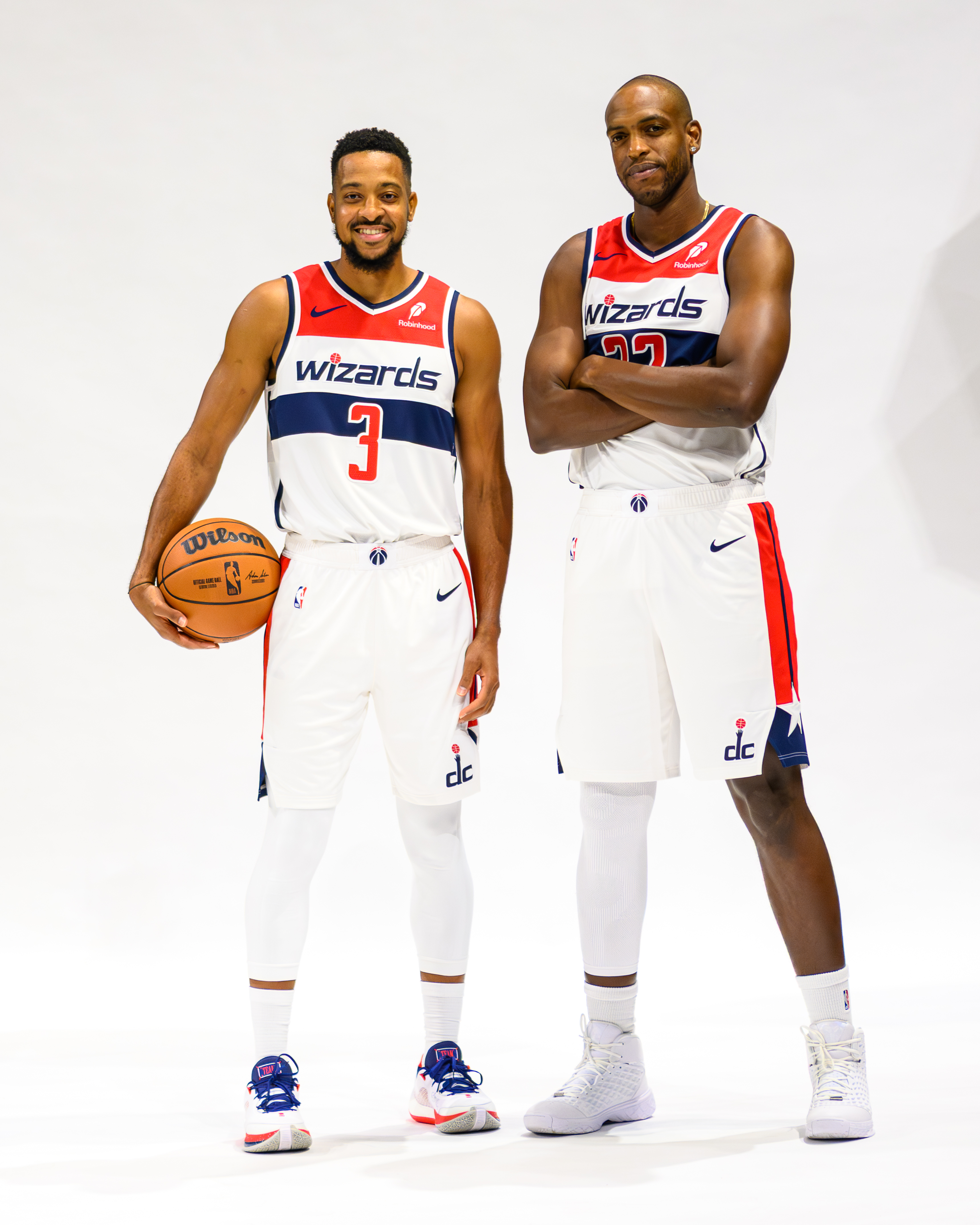
Middleton and CJ McCollum at Wizards Media Day in 2025

=== Washington Wizards (2025–2026) ===
On February 6, 2025, Middleton was traded to the Washington Wizards in a four-team trade that brought Kyle Kuzma to Milwaukee. On February 21, Middleton made his Wizards debut, putting up 12 points, five rebounds, two assists, and two steals in a 104–101 loss to his former team, the Milwaukee Bucks. During his first season with the Wizards, Middleton would only appear in 14 games, recording averages of 10.7 points, 3.7 rebounds, and 3.4 assists. After the season ended, Middleton would pick up his $33.3 million player option for the 2025-26 NBA season.

Entering the 2025-26 NBA season, Middleton would only appear in 34 games due to health concerns and injuries in both of his legs; in those contests, he averaged 10.3 points, 3.9 rebounds, and 3.3 assists. On February 3, 2026, Middleton would score 12 points (5–11 (FG) 2–4 (threes)), and would also tally up two rebounds and assists in a 101–132 loss against the New York Knicks, this would also be the last game of his Wizards tenure before he would get subsequently traded to the Dallas Mavericks.

=== Dallas Mavericks (2026) ===
On February 5, 2026, Middleton was traded to the Dallas Mavericks as part of a three-team trade involving the Charlotte Hornets. Additionally, this was Middleton's second time reuniting with head coach Jason Kidd, after he coached the Milwaukee Bucks for four years from July 2014 until January 22, 2018. On February 10, Middleton made his debut for the Mavericks, scoring 13 points (2-for-5 FG, 1-for-2 threes, 8-for-9 FT), and would also tally up five rebounds and two assists in 22 minutes of playtime in a 111–120 loss to the Phoenix Suns. On March 12, Middleton recorded 35 points on 10-of-17 shooting in a 120–112 victory over the Memphis Grizzlies; his output was the most by a Mavericks reserve since Rodrigue Beaubois logged 40 bench points on March 27, 2010. Middleton made 29 appearances (16 starts) for the Mavericks, averaging 10.0 points, 3.3 rebounds, and 2.2 assists.

=== Return to Washington (2026–present) ===
On July 8, 2026, Middleton was signed-and-traded back to the Washington Wizards in a six-team, 11-player trade in which the Mavericks acquired Santi Aldama and the draft rights to Tarik Biberović from the Memphis Grizzlies and Marcus Sasser from the Detroit Pistons. As part of the trade, Middleton signed a three-year, $17.6 million contract with Washington.

== Career statistics ==
Legend
GP	Games played	GS	Games started	MPG	Minutes per game
FG%	Field goal percentage	3P%	3-point field goal percentage	FT%	Free throw percentage
RPG	Rebounds per game	APG	Assists per game	SPG	Steals per game
BPG	Blocks per game	PPG	Points per game	**Bold**	Career high
†	Won an NBA championship	*	Led the league

=== NBA ===
==== Regular season ====
Year	Team	GP	GS	MPG	FG%	3P%	FT%	RPG	APG	SPG	BPG	PPG
2012–13	Detroit	27	0	17.6	.440	.311	.844	1.9	1.0	.6	.1	6.1
2013–14	Milwaukee	**82**	64	30.0	.440	.414	.861	3.8	2.1	1.0	.2	12.1
2014–15	Milwaukee	79	58	30.1	.467	.407	.859	4.4	2.3	1.5	.1	13.4
2015–16	Milwaukee	79	79	36.1	.444	.396	.888	3.8	4.2	**1.7**	.2	18.2
2016–17	Milwaukee	29	23	30.7	.450	**.433**	.880	4.2	3.4	1.4	.2	14.7
2017–18	Milwaukee	**82***	**82***	**36.4**	.466	.359	.884	5.2	4.0	1.5	**.3**	20.1
2018–19	Milwaukee	77	77	31.1	.441	.378	.837	6.0	4.3	1.0	.1	18.3
2019–20	Milwaukee	62	59	29.9	.497	.415	**.916**	**6.2**	4.3	.9	.1	**20.9**
2020–21†	Milwaukee	68	68	33.4	.476	.414	.898	6.0	**5.4**	1.1	.1	20.4
2021–22	Milwaukee	66	66	32.4	.443	.373	.890	5.4	**5.4**	1.2	**.3**	20.1
2022–23	Milwaukee	33	19	24.3	.436	.315	.902	4.2	4.9	.7	.2	15.1
2023–24	Milwaukee	55	55	27.0	.493	.381	.833	4.7	5.3	.9	**.3**	15.1
2024–25	Milwaukee	23	7	23.2	**.512**	.407	.848	3.7	4.4	.7	.2	12.6
2024–25	Washington	14	14	22.1	.413	.277	.868	3.7	3.4	1.3	.2	10.7
2025–26	Washington	34	34	24.3	.433	.333	.841	3.9	3.3	.8	**.3**	10.3
2025–26	Dallas	29	16	21.1	.404	.391	.910	3.3	2.2	.5	.0	10.0
Career		839	721	30.1	.458	.385	.878	4.7	3.9	1.1	.2	16.1
All-Star		3	0	21.8	.357	.400	1.000	3.7	2.7	.0	.0	10.0

==== Playoffs ====
Year	Team	GP	GS	MPG	FG%	3P%	FT%	RPG	APG	SPG	BPG	PPG
2015	Milwaukee	6	6	38.7	.380	.324	.933	3.7	2.0	**2.3**	.5	15.8
2017	Milwaukee	6	6	38.5	.397	.368	.818	4.7	5.3	2.0	.0	14.5
2018	Milwaukee	7	7	39.3	**.598**	**.610**	.737	5.1	3.1	.9	**.7**	**24.7**
2019	Milwaukee	15	15	34.4	.418	.435	.835	6.3	4.4	.6	.0	16.9
2020	Milwaukee	10	10	35.5	.394	.354	.826	6.9	6.0	1.1	.2	20.3
2021†	Milwaukee	**23**	**23**	**40.1**	.438	.343	.887	7.6	5.1	1.5	.2	23.6
2022	Milwaukee	2	2	35.7	.417	.429	**1.000**	5.0	**7.0**	1.5	.0	14.5
2023	Milwaukee	5	5	34.6	.465	.406	.867	6.4	6.2	.6	.0	23.8
2024	Milwaukee	6	6	38.3	.482	.355	.900	**9.2**	4.7	.5	.2	**24.7**
Career		80	80	37.6	.441	.390	.866	6.5	4.8	1.2	.2	20.6

=== College ===
Year	Team	GP	GS	MPG	FG%	3P%	FT%	RPG	APG	SPG	BPG	PPG
2009–10	Texas A&M	**34**	22	20.9	.416	.324	.750	3.7	1.1	.9	**.3**	7.2
2010–11	Texas A&M	33	**33**	**29.6**	**.450**	**.361**	**.784**	**5.2**	**2.8**	**1.2**	.1	**14.3**
2011–12	Texas A&M	20	17	28.8	.415	.260	.750	5.0	2.3	1.0	**.3**	13.2
Career		87	72	26.0	.431	.321	.768	4.6	2.0	1.0	.2	11.3

== Personal life ==
Middleton is a Christian.

He is a cousin of former NBA player Josh Powell who won two championships with the Los Angeles Lakers in 2009 and 2010.

On July 7, 2015, Middleton penned a column in The Players' Tribune about the Charleston church shooting. He explained that the shooting affected him deeply because he grew up in Charleston and his grandmother, Juanita, knew four of the nine people who died. Middleton had met one of the victims, Cynthia Graham Hurd, as she dropped her nephew off at a basketball camp not long before the shooting. "In Charleston, we're staying strong, but the wounds are still deep," he wrote.

On April 23, 2019, Middleton and his girlfriend welcomed their first daughter. In order to be there for the birth, Middleton got on a plane to Milwaukee with Bucks co-owner Marc Lasry immediately after a playoff win over the Detroit Pistons.

On March 13, 2020, Middleton said he would match Giannis Antetokounmpo's $100,000 donation to the staff of the Fiserv Forum who were unable to work during the suspension of the 2019–20 NBA season because of the COVID-19 pandemic.

On April 8, 2021, it was announced that he was joining the ownership group of the Brisbane Bullets, a professional basketball team in Australia.

== See also ==
- List of NBA career free throw percentage leaders
