= Cynthia Graham Hurd =

American librarian (1960–2015)

- Born: June 21, 1960; Charleston, South Carolina, U.S.
- Died: June 17, 2015 (aged 54); Charleston, South Carolina, U.S.
- Cause of death: Gunshot wound
- Occupation: Librarian
- Awards: Congressional Black Caucus Phoenix Award

Cynthia Graham Hurd (June 21, 1960 – June 17, 2015) was a librarian and community leader in Charleston, South Carolina. She was killed in the Charleston church shooting at the age of 54. After her death, the Cynthia Graham Hurd Foundation was created, the St. Andrews Library branch of the Charleston County Public Library was renamed the Cynthia Graham Hurd St. Andrews Regional Library, and a mural was painted on the John L. Dart Branch Library in her honor. Annual honorary library events, an award, and several scholarship funds have been established in her name.

== Biography ==
She was born in Charleston, South Carolina. Melvin and Henrietta Graham were her parents and she was one of six children. As a child, she and her siblings were members of the Emmanuel AME church. She attended the Immaculate Conception School, James Simmons Elementary School and the High School of Charleston, and graduated from Clark College (now Clark Atlanta University) in Atlanta in 1982 with a degree in mathematics. She was a member of Alpha Kappa Alpha. She returned to Charleston after her mother became ill to help care for her, and began her career as a librarian in 1984. Her father died in 1984, and her mother died in 1986. She completed her MLIS at the University of South Carolina in 1989.

She worked as a librarian in the Charleston, South Carolina library system for 31 years. At the time of her death, she had been the manager at St. Andrews Regional Library since 2011 and had previously worked as the branch manager of the John L. Dart Library in downtown Charleston, part of the Charleston County Public Libraries, since 1990. She was also a part-time librarian at the Robert Scott Small Library and Addlestone Library at the College of Charleston since the 1990s. In addition to her library work, she served on the board of the Housing Authority of the City of Charleston for over twenty years, and served on the board of the nonprofit Septima P. Clark Corp. She was married to Steve Hurd, a U.S. Merchant Marine. She died 4 days before her 55th birthday. Her siblings include Malcolm Graham and Melvin Graham.

At her funeral, Rep. James Clyburn (D-S.C.) "said Hurd embodied South Carolina's motto, a Latin phrase that translates to: 'While I breathe, I hope,'" according to NBC News, when he stated, "Because of the life of Cynthia Graham Hurd and eight other great people, I have hope today, I have great hope that South Carolina is going to live out its motto in a way that none of us would have ever believed." South Carolina Governor Nikki Haley stated, "I love the fact that she lived by the motto, 'Be kinder than necessary.' That's what I will take with me." A resolution passed by the South Carolina General Assembly on April 28, 2016, resolved "That the members of the South Carolina House of Representatives, by this resolution, celebrate the life of Cynthia Graham Hurd, librarian, community servant-leader, devoted family member, respected colleague, and friend to the many citizens of Charleston whose lives she influenced in a lifetime of service."

== Legacy ==
In 2015, the Charleston County Public Library renamed its St. Andrews Library branch, which she managed, the Cynthia Graham Hurd St. Andrews Regional Library, with local news reporting in 2020, "Those who visited the branches she worked at, and the staff who worked alongside her, say they’ll never forget her kindness."

The Cynthia Graham Hurd Foundation for Reading and Civic Engagement was established in 2015 to continue her legacy with literacy and reading programs.

In 2016, the artist R. Robots painted a mural of books on the John L. Dart Branch Library in her honor, in addition to other events to honor her legacy.

In 2020, the Charleston County Public Library created an anti-racism initiative designed to promote kindness by encouraging the use of #ThisIsForCynthia to share random acts of kindness, when its yearly in-person events to celebrate Hurd, including book drives, exhibits, and special programs were not possible due to the COVID-19 pandemic. The library also released a video tribute titled "Cynthia Graham Hurd, A Legacy Everlasting" on its social media.

In 2021, Hurd was featured in The South Carolina African American History Calendar, designed by the South Carolina Department of Education and its partners to provide "educators, parents, and visitors a method of identifying African American role models for all youth and honoring notable African American achievers with ties to South Carolina."

The College of Charleston has renamed its Colonial Scholarship for in-state students to the Cynthia Graham Hurd Memorial Scholarship. The Cynthia Graham Hurd Endowed Fellowship Fund was created in 2015 by the University of South Carolina School of Library and Information for individuals associated with the Charleston County Public Library System. Science Springer Nature offers an annual Cynthia Graham Hurd Memorial Scholarship to librarians. In 2019, the Charleston County Public Library (CCPL) created the Cynthia Graham Hurd Staff Award, "in recognition of a current staff member who has demonstrated to the public and community the same spirit, enthusiasm, dedication and commitment exhibited by Cynthia in carrying out the mission of CCPL."

Hurd was posthumously awarded the Phoenix Award from the Congressional Black Caucus.

Hurd was a close family friend to Juanita Middleton, the grandmother of Dallas Mavericks small forward Khris Middleton. Middleton briefly met with her before she dropped her nephew off at a basketball camp not long before the shooting. After her death, Middleton wrote, "In Charleston, we're staying strong, but the wounds are still deep,"
