= 2014–15 Kentucky Wildcats men's basketball team =

2014–15 season of University of Kentucky men's basketball team

2014–15 Kentucky Wildcats men's basketball

SEC tournament champions SEC regular season champions

NCAA tournament, Final Four
- Conference: Southeastern Conference

Ranking
- Coaches: No. 3
- AP: No. 1
- Record: 38–1 (18–0 SEC)
- Head coach: John Calipari (6th season)
- Assistant coaches: John Robic (6th season); Kenny Payne (5th season); Barry Rohrssen (1st season)
- Home arena: Rupp Arena

2014–15 Southeastern Conference men's basketball standings
	Conf.				Overall
Team	W		L	PCT	W		L	PCT
No. 1 Kentucky †	18	–	0	1.000	38	–	1	.974
No. 21 Arkansas	13	–	5	.722	27	–	9	.750
LSU	11	–	7	.611	22	–	11	.667
Georgia	11	–	7	.611	21	–	12	.636
Texas A&M	11	–	7	.611	21	–	12	.636
Ole Miss	11	–	7	.611	21	–	13	.618
Vanderbilt	9	–	9	.500	21	–	14	.600
Alabama	8	–	10	.444	19	–	15	.559
Florida	8	–	10	.444	16	–	17	.485
Tennessee	7	–	11	.389	16	–	16	.500
South Carolina	6	–	12	.333	17	–	16	.515
Mississippi State	6	–	12	.333	13	–	19	.406
Auburn	4	–	14	.222	15	–	20	.429
Missouri	3	–	15	.167	9	–	23	.281
† 2015 SEC tournament winner Rankings from AP poll

The 2014–15 Kentucky Wildcats men's basketball team represented the University of Kentucky in the 2014–15 college basketball season. The team played its home games in Lexington, Kentucky, United States for the 39th consecutive season at Rupp Arena, with a capacity of 23,500. The team was led by sixth-year head coach John Calipari. The team was a National semifinalist in the NCAA tournament, competed in the school's 17th Final Four. It was Calipari's fourth Final Four appearance at Kentucky. The team finished the regular season with a perfect 31–0 record, the best start in school history. For six years, they had been the last unbeaten team to enter the NCAA tournament until Gonzaga in 2021. Their 38 wins is tied with the 2012 Kentucky team for the most in men's Division I history. Their 38–1 record (.974 winning percentage) is the best by a team that did not finish undefeated.

After finishing as the National Runner-up in the 2014 NCAA tournament, the expectations for this team were high. The team, however, would be without some of its top players from the 2013–14 team including starting power forward Julius Randle and starting small forward James Young, who were first-round draft choices in the 2014 NBA draft. Returning were starting point guard Andrew Harrison, starting shooting guard Aaron Harrison, and starting center Dakari Johnson. Former McDonald's All-Americans Marcus Lee and Alex Poythress also returned to school. Willie Cauley-Stein opted to return to school after his leg injury in the 2014 NCAA tournament. John Calipari once again produced another top recruiting class that was highlighted by Karl-Anthony Towns.

The Wildcats were led by 2015 Consensus All-Americans Cauley-Stein and Towns.

== Departures ==
2014–15 Kentucky departures

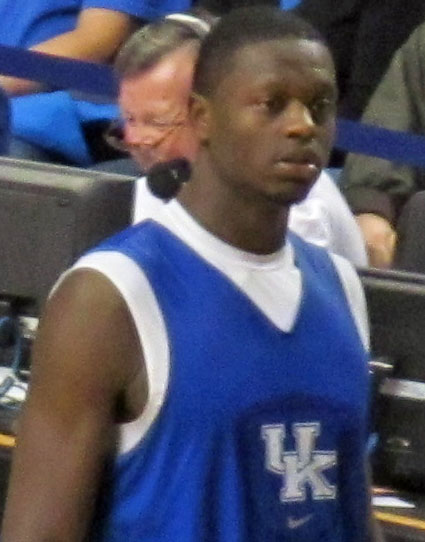
Julius Randle entered the NBA draft

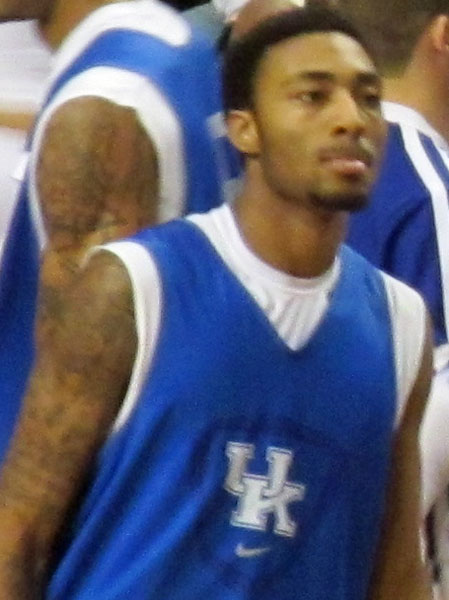
James Young entered the NBA draft

Name	Number	Pos.	Height	Weight	Year	Hometown	Notes
Jon Hood	4	Guard	6'7"	215	Senior	Madisonville, Kentucky	Graduated
Jarrod Polson	3	Guard	6'2"	182	Senior	Wilmore, Kentucky	Graduated
Julius Randle	30	Forward	6'9"	250	Freshman	Dallas, Texas	Entered 2014 NBA draft
James Young	1	Forward	6'7"	215	Freshman	Rochester Hills, Michigan	Entered 2014 NBA Draft

== 2014–15 newcomers ==
Kentucky recruits at the 2014 McDonald's All-American Boys Game

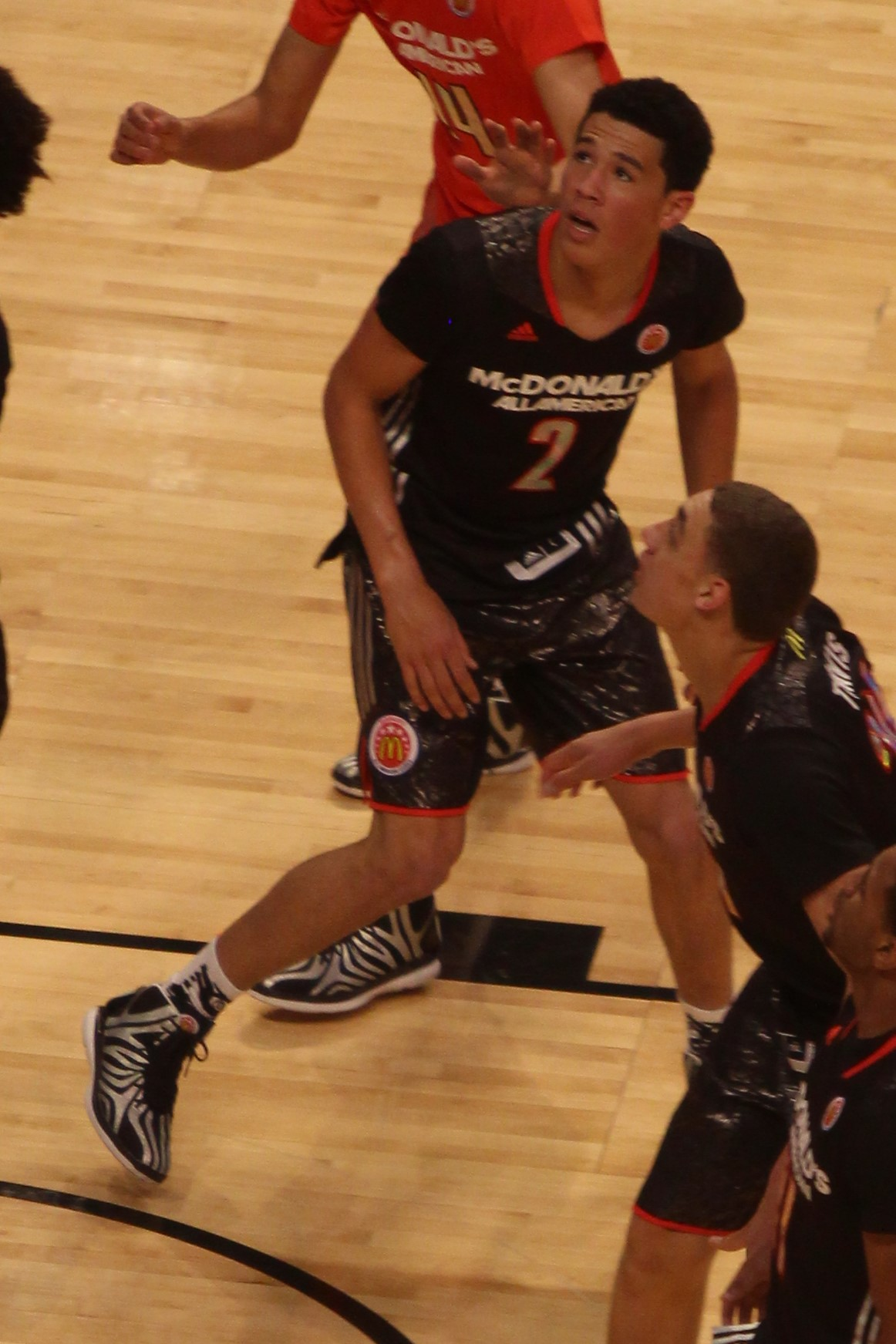
Devin Booker

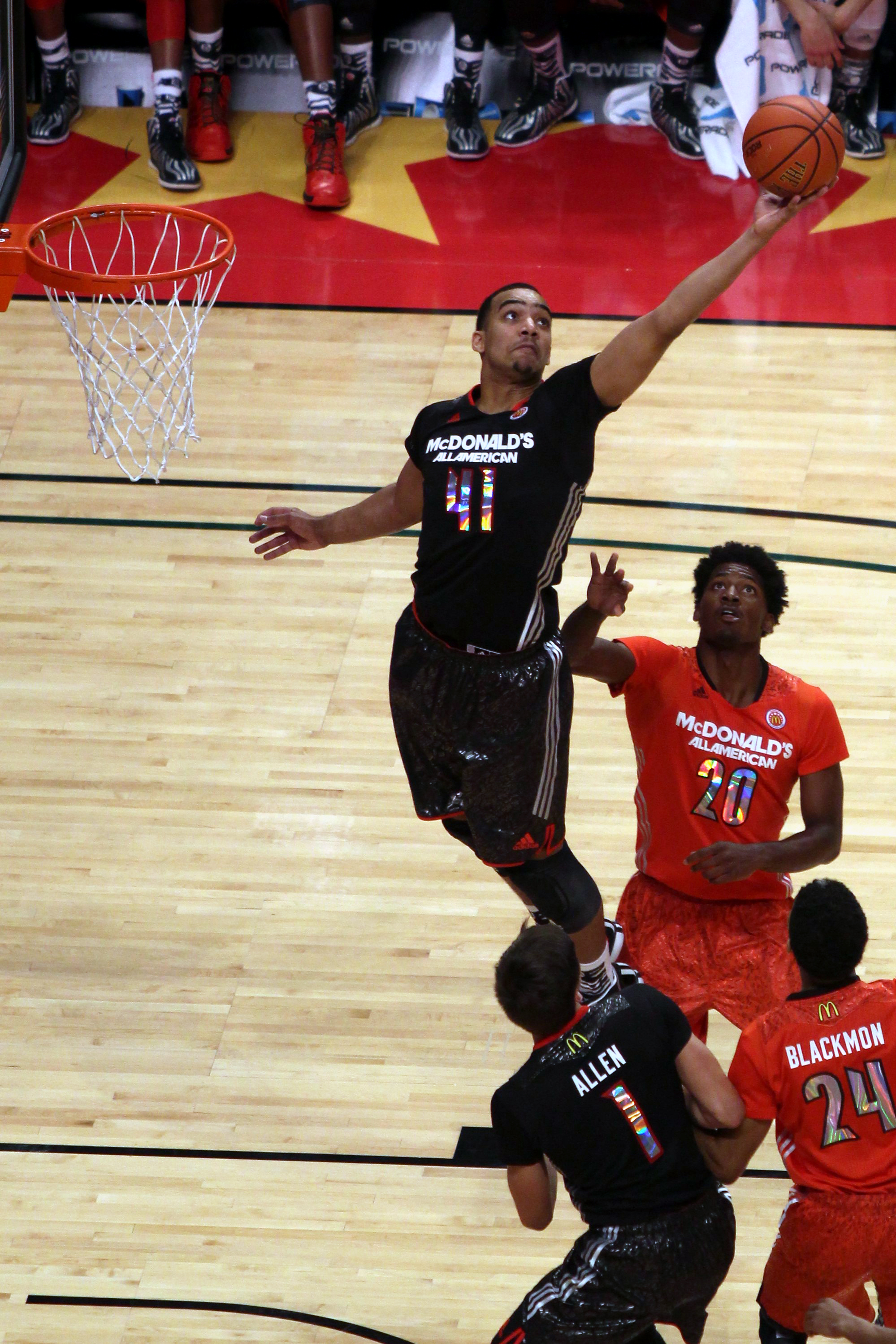
Trey Lyles

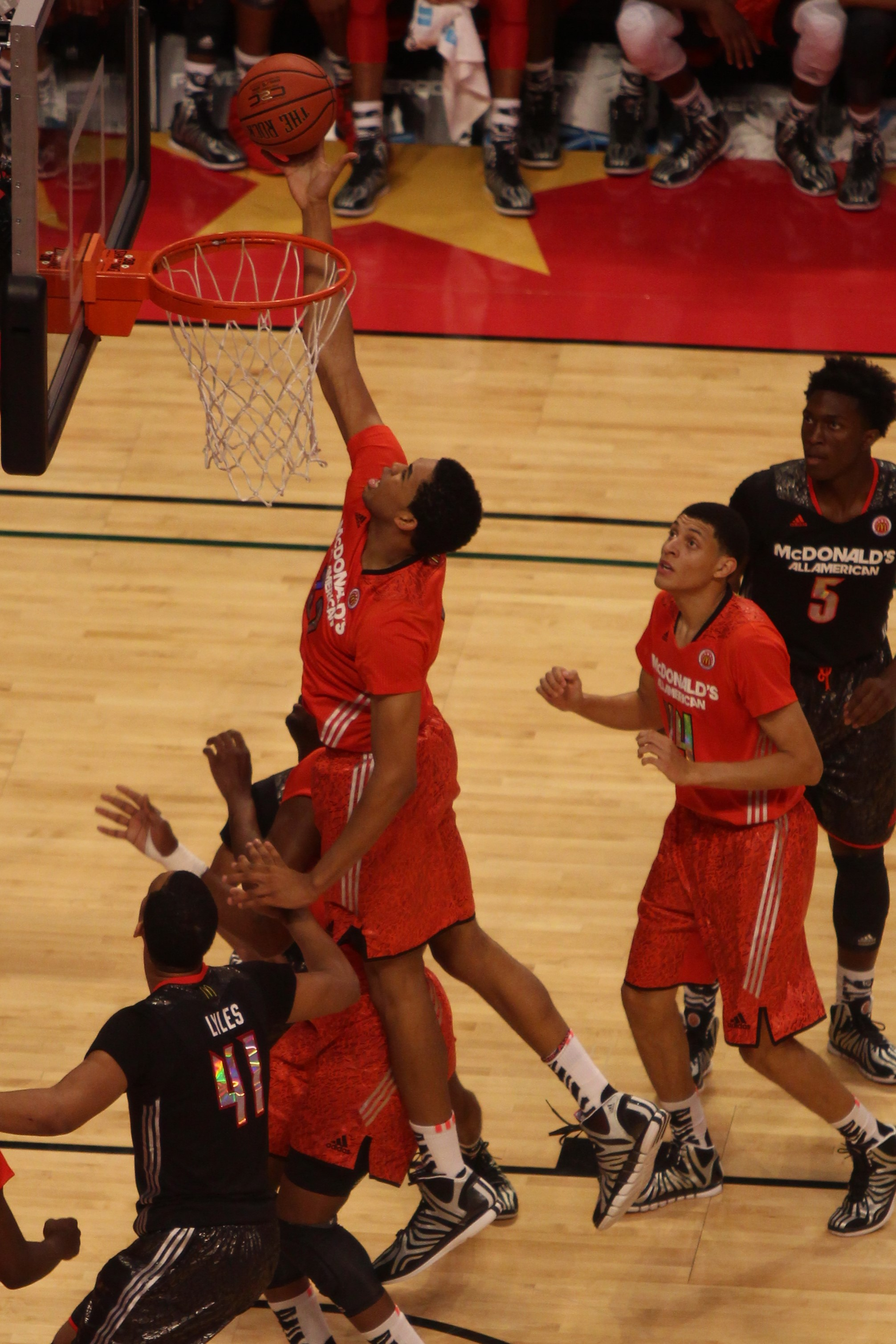
Karl-Anthony Towns

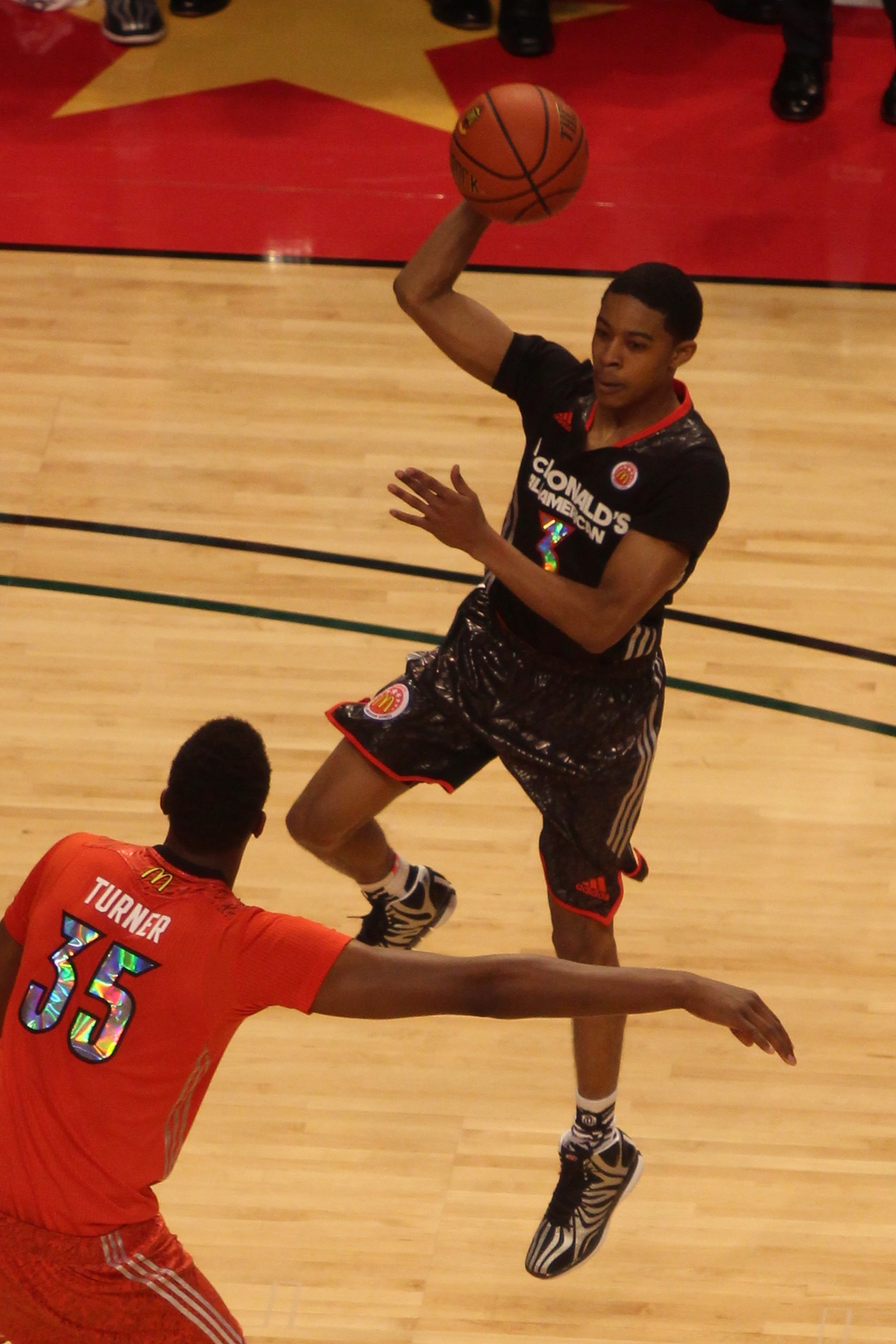
Tyler Ulis

In November, Kentucky signed another top recruiting class. John Calipari announced four players for his 2014 class during the early signing period on November 14. Trey Lyles (Indianapolis), Karl-Anthony Towns (Metuchen, N.J.), Devin Booker (Grand Rapids, Mich.) and Tyler Ulis (Chicago Heights, Ill.) all signed national letters of intent to play basketball at the University of Kentucky, starting in the 2014–15 season.

Karl-Anthony Towns was the first commitment for the class when he verbally committed on December 4, 2012. He was named Gatorade National Player of the Year in 2014. He played for the Dominican Republic National Team in 2012 and 2013 which were coached by John Calipari and Kentucky assistant, Orlando Antigua. He was ranked as No. 6 overall by ESPN and No. 11 by Rivals and Scout.

Tyler Ulis was the second commitment in the class when he verbally committed on September 13, 2013. He committed to Kentucky briefly after he was offered a scholarship. Kentucky had just missed on their primary target, Emmanuel Mudiay, when he committed to SMU on August 24, 2013. Ulis, however, quickly rose in the recruiting rankings, finishing No. 20 overall by Scout, No. 21 overall by Rivals, and No. 25 overall by ESPN. He chose Kentucky over Iowa, Michigan State, and Southern Cal.

Devin Booker was the third commitment in the class when he verbally committed on October 31, 2013. He was ranked as the No. 18 overall by ESPN and No. 29 overall by Scout and Rivals. As a junior, he was named by Gatorade as the top basketball player in Mississippi. He is the son of the former Missouri and All-American great Melvin Booker. He chose Kentucky over his Dad's alma mater and Michigan.

Trey Lyles was the final commitment in the class when he verbally committed on November 5, 2013. After his senior season, he was named Indiana Mr. Basketball, where he led his high school to a state championship. He committed to Kentucky over rivals Indiana and Louisville. He was rated as the No. 6 overall player by ESPN, the No. 11 overall by Scout, and the No. 13 overall by Rivals.

College recruiting
Name	Hometown	School	Height	Weight	Commit date
Devin Booker; G	Grand Rapids, Michigan	Moss Point	6 ft 6 in (1.98 m)	185 lb (84 kg)	Oct 31, 2013
Devin Booker; G	Recruit ratings: Scout: Rivals: 247Sports: ESPN:				
Trey Lyles; F	Indianapolis, Indiana	Arsenal Tech	6 ft 10 in (2.08 m)	235 lb (107 kg)	Nov 5, 2013
Trey Lyles; F	Recruit ratings: Scout: Rivals: 247Sports: ESPN:				
Karl-Anthony Towns; C	Metuchen, New Jersey	St. Joseph	6 ft 11 in (2.11 m)	235 lb (107 kg)	Dec 4, 2012
Karl-Anthony Towns; C	Recruit ratings: Scout: Rivals: 247Sports: ESPN:				
Tyler Ulis; G	Chicago, Illinois	Marian Catholic	5 ft 8 in (1.73 m)	150 lb (68 kg)	Sep 13, 2013
Tyler Ulis; G	Recruit ratings: Scout: Rivals: 247Sports: ESPN:				
Overall recruit ranking:
Note: In many cases, Scout, Rivals, 247Sports, On3, and ESPN may conflict in their listings of height and weight.; In these cases, the average was taken. ESPN grades are on a 100-point scale.; Sources: "Kentucky 2014 Basketball Commitments". Rivals.; "2014 Kentucky Basketball Commits". Scout.; "ESPN". ESPN.; "Scout.com Team Recruiting Rankings". Scout.; "2014 Team Ranking". Rivals.

== Pre-season ==
=== Roster ===
The first player to make known his decision was Cauley-Stein, who decided to return to school on April 14. On April 17 Young declared himself eligible for the 2014 NBA draft. Shortly after Young's announcement, Lee announced that he would return for his sophomore season on April 18. On April 22 Randle also declared himself eligible for the draft. Following Randle's announcement, on April 23 Johnson and Poythress announced they were returning to school. The Harrison twins soon after announced that they were returning for their sophomore seasons on April 25.

=== Off-season rankings ===
Immediately following the 2014 NCAA tournament, the earliest predictions started being made by the media despite draft status uncertainty. While speculation about Randle and Young's returns remained speculation, projections abounded: 1 CBS Sports, 3 by ESPN, 5 by NBC Sports, 5 by USA Today, 5 by Yahoo! Sports, and 6 by Bleacher Report. Following the April 27 NBA draft entry deadline, revised predictions had Kentucky : 1 by Bleacher Report, CBS Sports, ESPN, NBC Sports, and 2 by USA Today. Along with the projected ranking, the Las Vegas 2015 NCAA Division I men's basketball tournament betting lines opened with Kentucky as a 5/1 favorite on April 29.

=== Accolades ===
Karl-Anthony Towns, among several Wildcats, was seen by prognosticators as an All-American when the preseason teams were named. USA Today selected him as a First Team All-American. The Blue Ribbon College Basketball Yearbook selected Towns as a Second Team All-American. Bleacher Report, CBS Sports, and NBC Sports selected Towns as a Third Team All-American. Aaron Harrison was selected by Blue Ribbon and Sports Illustrated as a Second Team All-American. Andrew Harrison was selected by Athlon Sports as a Second Team All-American. Willie Cauley-Stein was selected as a Third Team All-American by Blue Ribbon.

The Southeastern Conference preseason media poll was released at the SEC Media Days in October, it predicted that Kentucky would win the championship and selected Aaron Harrison as its Player of the Year. Aaron Harrison was also named to the All-SEC First Team while Cauley-Stein, Andrew Harrison, Poythress and Towns were named to the All-SEC Second Team.

USA Today announced its initial coaches poll on October 18 with Kentucky ranked as No. 1 in the country. The Associated Press announced on October 31 that Kentucky was ranked No. 1 to start the season in its initial poll of the season.

=== Events ===
Prior to the regular season Kentucky played in a six-game series in the Bahamas from August 10 through August 17 called the Big Blue Bahamas Tour. The three opponents in the series consisted of international clubs and teams from the Dominican Republic, France, and Puerto Rico. Games were played at Kendal G. L. Isaacs National Gymnasium in Nassau, Bahamas. The university spent a total of $792,845.68 on the trip which included flights, lodging, meals, and games.

Tickets for Big Blue Madness, Kentucky's version of Midnight Madness went on sale and sold out on September 20.

Big Blue Madness took place on October 18. The event debuted the team for the 2014–15 season. It included player introductions, a speech by Calipari, and a scrimmage.

The Blue-White scrimmage was the first live game for the team. It occurred at Rupp Arena on October 27. Andrew Harrison scored 19 points, added 18 and the Blue squad dominated the White 94–66.

== Roster ==
2014–15 Kentucky Wildcats men's basketball team
Players
Coaches

Pos.	#	Name	Height	Weight	Year	Previous school	Hometown
F	00	Marcus Lee	6 ft 9 in (2.06 m)	220 lb (100 kg)	So	Deer Valley	Antioch, California
G	1	Devin Booker	6 ft 6 in (1.98 m)	206 lb (93 kg)	Fr	Moss Point	Grand Rapids, Michigan
G	2	Aaron Harrison	6 ft 6 in (1.98 m)	212 lb (96 kg)	So	Travis	Fort Bend, Texas
G	3	Tyler Ulis	5 ft 9 in (1.75 m)	155 lb (70 kg)	Fr	Marian Catholic	Lima, Ohio
G	5	Andrew Harrison	6 ft 6 in (1.98 m)	210 lb (95 kg)	So	Travis	Fort Bend, Texas
C	12	Karl-Anthony Towns	7 ft 0 in (2.13 m)	250 lb (113 kg)	Fr	St. Joseph	Piscataway, New Jersey
G	13	Sam Malone	5 ft 11 in (1.8 m)	185 lb (84 kg)	Sr	Scituate	Scituate, Massachusetts
F	15	Willie Cauley-Stein	7 ft 0 in (2.13 m)	240 lb (109 kg)	Jr	Olathe Northwest	Olathe, Kansas
G	21	Tod Lanter	6 ft 2 in (1.88 m)	190 lb (86 kg)	Sr	Dunbar/Gulf Coast State CC	Lexington, Kentucky
F	22	Alex Poythress (injured)	6 ft 8 in (2.03 m)	238 lb (108 kg)	Jr	Northeast	Clarksville, Tennessee
G	24	E. J. Floréal	6 ft 4 in (1.93 m)	200 lb (91 kg)	So	Dunbar (Lexington, Kentucky)	Palo Alto, California
G	25	Dominique Hawkins	6 ft 0 in (1.83 m)	195 lb (88 kg)	So	Madison Central	Richmond, Kentucky
G	32	Brian Long	5 ft 9 in (1.75 m)	155 lb (70 kg)	Sr	River Dell	Dumont, New Jersey
F	35	Derek Willis	6 ft 9 in (2.06 m)	216 lb (98 kg)	So	Bullitt East	Mount Washington, Kentucky
F	41	Trey Lyles	6 ft 10 in (2.08 m)	235 lb (107 kg)	Fr	Arsenal Tech	Regina, Saskatchewan
C	44	Dakari Johnson	7 ft 0 in (2.13 m)	255 lb (116 kg)	So	Montverde	Brooklyn, New York

Head coach

- John Calipari (Clarion)

Assistant coach(es)

- John Robic (Denison)
- Kenny Payne (Louisville)
- Barry Rohrssen (St. Francis Brooklyn)
- Tony Barbee (UMass)

Legend

- (C) Team captain
- (S) Suspended
- (I) Ineligible
- (W) Walk-on
- Injured
- Current redshirt

- Roster is subject to change as/if players transfer or leave the program for other reasons.

== Schedule ==
=== November ===
The season officially began on November 14 with an 85 to 45 victory over Grand Canyon in the first game of the Cawood Ledford Classic at Rupp Arena. Willie Cauley-Stein added 12 points, Dakari Johnson had 13 rebounds and 10 points and Trey Lyles had 14 points. Two days later on November 16 Kentucky defeated Buffalo 71–52 in the second game of the Cawood Ledford Classic at Rupp Arena. Buffalo led by 5 at halftime, but Kentucky used a 9–0 run to start the second half to regain the lead. Two nights later Kentucky traveled to Indianapolis to face No. 5 Kansas in the annual Champions Classic. Kentucky defeated Kansas 72–40 which was Kansas' lowest number of points scored since 1962. Kentucky's defense was stifling as they limited Kansas to 19.6 percent from the field and blocked 11 of Kansas' shots. Three nights later Kentucky defeated Boston University 89 to 65 at Rupp Arena. Aaron Harrison scored 19 points, Devin Booker added 15, and top-ranked Kentucky shot 59 percent from the field. Two nights later Kentucky defeated Montana State 86–28 in the third game of the Cawood Ledford Classic at Rupp Arena. Kentucky opened the second half on a 26–0 run, and Montana State's 28 points is the fewest for a UK opponent since the shot clock era began in 1985–86. Two nights later Kentucky defeated UT-Arlington 92–44 in the final game of the Cawood Ledford Classic. Kentucky won consecutive games by at least 48 points (58 points vs. Montana State and 48 points vs. UT Arlington) for the first time since 1954. After a five-day break Kentucky defeated Providence 58 to 38 at Rupp Arena. Kentucky finished November ranked No. 1 in the AP and USA Today polls and with a 7–0 record.

=== December ===
On December 5 Kentucky defeated No. 6 Texas 63–51 in a Big 12/SEC Challenge game at Rupp Arena. The game was tied at halftime until Kentucky outscored the Longhorns 18 to 2 in the first 8:40 of the second half to make it 44–28. Cauley-Stein totaled a career-high 21 points and a season-high 12 rebounds, his first double-double of the season. Two nights later Kentucky defeated Eastern Kentucky 82–49 at Rupp Arena. The only excitement from the game came late when Aaron Harrison made Kentucky's first 3-point basket with a few minutes remaining. Harrison's make extended Kentucky's 908 game streak of making at least one three-pointer. Eastern Kentucky coach Jeff Neubauer proclaimed after the game that his team was "...guarded by the best defensive team in the modern era of college basketball...". Three nights later Kentucky defeated Columbia 56 to 46 at Rupp Arena. Columbia opened the game with an 11 to 0 lead and did not surrender the lead until the second half. After the first four minutes Kentucky ended the game on a 56–35 run. Three days later Kentucky renewed its rivalry with North Carolina at Rupp Arena, defeating the Tar Heels 84–70. Two days prior to the game Poythress suffered a knee injury that would force him to miss the remainder of the season. Players showed support for their injured teammate by wearing blue "Roar for 22" T-shirts during warmups. Lyles got his first career start in his absence and scored 9 points. After a week off Kentucky traveled to Chicago to play UCLA in the inaugural CBS Sports Classic. Kentucky defeated the Bruins in dominating fashion, 83–44. The Wildcats were leading 24 to 0 before UCLA scored their first point with 12 minutes left in the first half. Kentucky led 41–7 at halftime. It was the lowest point total in a half for UCLA and the fewest by a Kentucky opponent since December 1943. After the UCLA game the team took a week off for the Holidays. Upon their return they traveled to the KFC Yum! Center for their first road test of the season against in-state rival No. 4 Louisville. Ulis had a career game, scoring career-best 14 points off the bench to defeat the Cards 58–50. This was Kentucky's seventh victory in eight games against Louisville with Calipari as head coach.

=== January ===
Kentucky opened the SEC portion of their schedule on January 6 at home against Ole Miss. After looking dominant in November and December, the Cats were taken to the wire by the Rebels. UK needed overtime to outlast Ole Miss 89–86. Unfazed by trailing Kentucky 12 to 0 and 18 to 5, Ole Miss' Stefan Moody helped the Rebels regroup to mount runs of 10–0 and 7–0 to get within 23–22 before eventually taking a four-point lead with 7:01 left in the half. The Rebels led 38–36 at the break behind 50 percent shooting before Kentucky opened the second half with a spurt that put them by as many as six before Mississippi battled back. Wildcats guard Aaron Harrison thwarted the Rebels' quest by scoring 26 points, including two big free throws with 1:29 remaining in overtime to put Kentucky ahead to stay. After the scare Ole Miss put into Kentucky, they rebounded on January 10 at Texas A&M behind Booker's 18 points to a 70–64 victory in double-overtime. The Aggies rallied in the final minutes to tie it in regulation. Lyles made two foul shots with six seconds left in the first overtime for Kentucky, and Texas A&M took its time before missing a long 3 at the buzzer. Down 66 to 63, Texas A&M's Kourtney Roberson made one of two free throws before a turnover by Lyles gave the Aggies the ball back with 26.9 seconds left. A&M's Danuel House missed a 3-pointer with 16 seconds left and Kentucky's Johnson made two free throws to seal the game. Kentucky returned home on January 13 to defeat Missouri 86 to 37. Aaron Harrison scored 16 points including five 3-pointers to lift Kentucky to their first SEC win in regulation. Cauley-Stein added 13 points and Towns 12 points with 10 rebounds as Kentucky shot 48 percent from the field. The Wildcats also held Missouri to a season-low 27 percent and outrebounded the Tigers 46 to 27 including 30 defensive boards. On January 17 Kentucky traveled to Tuscaloosa to defeat Alabama 70–48. Kentucky used two big runs to take a 35 to 17 lead by halftime. Alabama trimmed the lead in half with a 13–4 run coming out of the locker room, when the Wildcats missed their first five shots. The rally was short-lived, and then it got worse for the Tide. The Wildcats reclaimed control with 10 straight points en route to a 16–2 run that featured two 3-pointers by Ulis, one by Booker and a powerful dunk by Cauley-Stein. Freshman Devin Booker scored 13 points and remained solid from the perimeter. On January 20 Kentucky defeated Vanderbilt 65–57 at Rupp Arena. The Wildcats didn't lead by double digits until early in the second half, and that 45–33 advantage lasted briefly as the Commodores began answering from the perimeter to stay within reach. Five combined 3-pointers by Vanderbilt's Riley LaChance (16 points) and Matthew Fisher-Davis (13) helped Vanderbilt pull within 58–54 with 2:36 left. The Commodores never got closer as the Harrisons closed it out for the Wildcats. On January 24 Kentucky traveled to Columbia to defeat South Carolina 58–43. In the season prior, Kentucky lost 72–67 on this same floor only weeks before their run to the National Championship game. However, the Wildcats turned up the defense to make sure that didn't happen this time after South Carolina's Sindarius Thornwell hit a 3-pointer for a 24–23 South Carolina lead with 4:31 left that sent the fans into a frenzy. Ulis started the comeback for Kentucky with a steal and basket before Booker made two fouls shots and a dunk and the Wildcats were on their way. Booker scored seven points in Kentucky's 14 to 0 run that spanned both halves, closing the surge with a 3-pointer that put the Wildcats ahead 37–24 with 18:28 remaining. On January 29 the Wildcats again traveled to Columbia, this time to defeat Missouri 69 to 53. The Tigers looked game for most of the first half. Milking the clock with crisp ball movement, Missouri was able to crack Kentucky's long and lean front line for easy baskets. Missouri's Keanau Post started it with a rim-rattling dunk a few minutes in, and a pair of dunks by Ryan Rosburg had the fans in Mizzou Arena on their feet. Another dunk by Jakeenan Gant late in the half allowed the Tigers to close within 32–25. The Wildcats struggled some more early in the second half, throwing up a series of ugly jumpers and missing a couple shots at the rim. Missouri struggled to take advantage, but did close within 38 to 32 on Clark's basket with 14:25 to go. Foul trouble began to set in, though, with Missouri's Namon Wright and Montaque Gill-Caesar each picking up their fourth with more than 15 minutes left in the game. The Wildcats, with more quality depth, were able to capitalize on their absences and put together a 10 to 2 run to gain control. The Harrison twins led the way. Aaron knocked down a jumper, and after Andrew did the same, he proceeded to the foul line on the next four trips down the floor. Wright fouled out with 8:52 to go. Gill-Caesar joined him less than a minute later. And by the time the Wildcats had hit those free throws, their lead had swelled to 56–36. On January 30 Kentucky faced off against Alabama for the second time this season at Rupp Arena, defeating the Crimson Tide 70 to 55. Towns scored all 12 of his points in the first half to put Kentucky ahead. Cauley-Stein snapped out of a mini-slump with 12 points and four rebounds, Booker added 11 points with three 3-pointers and Aaron Harrison had 10. Kentucky quickly rolled to a double-digit lead and positioned itself to blow out Alabama before settling for a 37–24 advantage at the break. Kentucky controlled the paint 28 to 14 while their bench dominated the Tide 31–8. Kentucky also committed just five turnovers while forcing Alabama into 13 mistakes that resulted in 20 points.

=== February ===
On February 3 Kentucky hosted Georgia at Rupp Arena, defeating the Bulldogs 69 to 58. The Bulldogs were without leading scorer and rebounder Marcus Thornton, who was out due to a concussion. Andrew Harrison scored 23 points and combined with Towns for key baskets down the stretch that helped Kentucky pull away. Harrison's layup with 3:58 remaining provided a 62 to 54 lead before baskets by Georgia's Yante Maten and Nemanja Djurisic pulled the Bulldogs to 63 to 58 with 2:06 left. Towns' short jumper with 1:33 left got the lead to seven, and Tyler Ulis and Harrison each added two free throws in the final minute for the Wildcats. On February 7 Kentucky traveled to Gainesville to face arch-rival Florida. Florida swept all three meetings in 2014, winning in Lexington, in Gainesville and in the SEC tournament. Both teams advanced to the Final Four in 2014, but had gone in different directions in 2015. Florida entered the game one game over .500 and struggling mightily through the beginning of SEC play. Aaron Harrison scored 23 points, Towns added 19 and the Wildcats remained unbeaten with a 68 to 61 victory over the Gators before a national television audience on ESPN's College GameDay. Florida led by nine in the first half and used a 6 to 0 run to go up 44–42 midway through the second half. However, Cauley-Stein's dunk proved to be the turning point. Florida's Devon Robinson turned the ball over on one end, and Cauley-Stein was the beneficiary on the other. He caught a pass in transition near the foul line, took two steps and then slammed it over Robinson. He was fouled on the play and made the free throw to put Kentucky ahead for good. Free throws were huge down the stretch, too. Kentucky closed out the game from the charity stripe and finished 21 of 22 from there. On February 9 traveled to Baton Rouge face LSU before another national television audience on ESPN. Frustrated by the way his team was playing, coach Calipari told them he hoped they'd lose. They almost did. Towns redeemed himself after drawing a technical foul for hanging on the basket and the ire of his coach by hitting a go-head jump hook with 1:30 left and grabbing a clutch offensive rebound against LSU in the final minute to help Kentucky stay unbeaten, defeating the Tigers 71–69. Calipari explained that he wanted to make sure his team won't lose elimination games in March over senseless fouls, so even as his assistants pleaded with him to call timeout, he just watched and joined in the ear-ringing frenzy at the sold out Pete Maravich Assembly Center during a stunning 21–2 LSU run that gave the Tigers a 66 to 60 lead. LSU's Keith Hornsby had a shot to win it for LSU in the final seconds, but his off-balance 3 bounced off the outside of the rim, and Kentucky was victorious. On February 14 Kentucky returned to Rupp Arena to face off against South Carolina for the second time this season. After holding South Carolina to 27 percent shooting in last month's meeting, Kentucky limited the Gamecocks to just 13 of 55 from the field (24 percent) this time. Kentucky had a strong start that put South Carolina in a hole that steadily deepened. The Wildcats led 26 to 6 with 8:21 left in the first half and never eased off in overwhelming South Carolina on both ends. It was 43 to 18 at halftime, and Kentucky poured it on against a Gamecocks squad looking to build off a five-point win over Missouri. On February 17 Kentucky traveled to Knoxville to face arch-rival Tennessee. Booker had 18 points and seven rebounds as Kentucky picked up its defense in the second half and pulled away for a 66 to 48 victory over the Volunteers. The victory set a new record for the historic program as they became 26–0 for the first time, though the Wildcats finished the 1953–54 season with a 25–0 mark. On February 21 Kentucky returned to Rupp Arena to defeat Auburn 110 to 75. Towns scored 19 points to lead six Kentucky players in double figures. The Wildcats recorded their highest scoring total since 2002 in the blowout win over the Tigers. The victory also extended their best start ever and equaled the 1995–96 squad's school-record 27-game winning streak. At halftime Kentucky hoisted legendary player Tony Delk's #00 jersey in the rafters. On February 25 Kentucky traveled to Starkville to face Mississippi State. Kentucky looked slightly mortal for most of the first half, letting a 14-point lead evaporate to 33 to 27. Ulis hit a 3-pointer just before the halftime buzzer to push the Wildcats' advantage to 36 to 27. They had a few more careless defensive moments early in the second half, which helped Mississippi State briefly make things interesting. Mississippi State's Craig Sword's pass to a wide-open Roquez Johnson led to an easy layup, pulling the Bulldogs within four with 15 minutes remaining. Kentucky responded with the next six points by pounding the ball into the paint and using its significant size advantage to pull away for the win. Lyles scored 18 points, and Kentucky was victorious 74–56. On February 28 Kentucky returned to Rupp Arena to face off against nationally ranked Arkansas. The Razorbacks entered the game ranked No. 16/18 in the AP and USA Today Coaches polls. This was the first ranked opponent since they defeated Louisville in late December. Arkansas also entered the game on a three-game win streak over Kentucky. The Wildcats seized the tempo from the start with a quick pace that knocked the Razorbacks on their heels. Lyles started things off with a lob dunk from Towns (eight points, five rebounds), who followed with a putback basket. Aaron Harrison (nine points, seven rebounds) soon added a 3-pointer to get a sellout crowd into the game, and Kentucky had plenty more in an energetic if chippy first half by both teams. Arkansas went 0 for 9 from long range and shot 30 percent overall while getting outrebounded 24 to 18 through 20 minutes as Kentucky built a 42–26 halftime lead. At one point in the second half the lead swelled to 31 points. The Wildcats clinched the Southeastern Conference regular-season title defeating the Razorbacks 84–67.

=== March ===
On March 2 Kentucky traveled to Athens to for its second meeting with Georgia. Facing the largest second-half deficit of its so-far perfect season, Kentucky clamped down defensively, ripped off a 14 to 0 run and defeat Georgia 72–64. Georgia's Yante Maten tipped in a miss of his own shot on the second attempt to put the Bulldogs up 56–47 with just over 9 minutes remaining. Towns and Aaron Harrison were huge down the stretch, combining for 12 of the 14 points during the decisive run. Towns had seven, including a three-point play with 2:53 left that put Kentucky ahead to stay. Harrison chipped in with five, and Cauley-Stein came up with a huge dunk off a missed free throw to give the Wildcats a four-point play on one possession. On March 7, Kentucky returned to Rupp Arena to face Florida on senior night in the regular season finale. Kentucky embraced its milestone following the 67–50 victory over the Gators. The Wildcats gathered at midcourt and donned their blue T-shirts with 31-0 Not Done Yet in white. Kentucky became the first team from a Power 5 conference to achieve a perfect record during the regular season in over twenty-five years.

=== SEC tournament ===
Kentucky entered the 2015 SEC tournament as the top-overall seed and bye until the quarterfinals. The SEC tournament took place at Bridgestone Arena in Nashville. On March 13, Kentucky met Florida for the third time of the season with the right to go to the semifinals of the SEC tournament. In the day prior, Florida defeated Alabama in the second round to advance to the quarterfinals. Aaron Harrison and Towns each scored 13 points and Kentucky shut down Florida in the second half to pull away for a 64–49 victory. The height advantage helped Kentucky outrebound Florida 39 to 33, including a 16 to 11 edge offensively that created extra chances and earned frequent trips to the free-throw line. Towns also had 12 boards. On March 14 Kentucky met Auburn in the semifinals of the SEC tournament. In the day prior, Auburn upset LSU in overtime. Kentucky poured it on against an Auburn squad that lost two players in less than 24 hours. Auburn forward Jordon Granger was suspended for fighting in Friday's quarterfinal win over LSU, and the school announced just before the tipoff that forward Cinmeon Bowers had been suspended for a potential rules violation. Cauley-Stein scored 18 points and Andrew Harrison added 15 to help Kentucky improve to 33–0 in a 91 to 67 victory over the Tigers and advance to the finals of the SEC tournament. The win broke the school-record winning streak of 32 games set from December 5, 1953, to January 8, 1955. On March 15 Kentucky met Arkansas in the title game of the SEC tournament. The Razorbacks defeated Georgia in the semifinals the day prior. Cauley-Stein scored 15 points and grabbed 10 rebounds, and Kentucky never trailed in beating No. 21 Arkansas 78 to 63 for the program's 28th SEC tournament title. Kentucky scored the first eight points as Andrew Harrison hit two 3s early. Arkansas had not trailed in this tournament, yet against Kentucky the best the Razorbacks could do was tie the game four times with the last at 19-all on a 3-pointer by Qualls with 7:59 left. By the time the Razorbacks worked the ball inside against Kentucky's blue wall, they struggled to knock down shots. After Qualls' 3, they didn't score another field goal the rest of the half. Kentucky scored seven straight as part of a 16–4 run to finish the half with a 41–25 lead.

=== NCAA tournament ===
Kentucky entered the NCAA tournament as the number one overall seed in the Midwest region. The top four seeds within the region included Kentucky, Kansas, Notre Dame, and Maryland. The semifinals and finals of the region were held in Cleveland.

==== Round of 64 ====
On Selection Sunday, it was announced that Kentucky would play its opening round games in Louisville at the KFC Yum! Center against the winner of a play-in game between Hampton and Manhattan. Hampton defeated Manhattan 74–64 on March 17. On March 20, Kentucky played Hampton and defeated the Pirates 79–56. Towns bounced back from a mini slump with 21 points and 11 rebounds, Andrew Harrison added 14 points, and the Wildcats rolled to an opening game victory.

==== Round of 32 ====
On March 20, 8th-seeded Cincinnati and 9th-seeded Purdue squared off in the game prior to Kentucky and Hampton playing. The Bearcats outlasted the Boilermakers 66–65 in overtime. On March 22 Cincinnati and Kentucky met in Louisville for a berth to the Sweet 16. This was the first meeting between the two programs since the 2005 NCAA tournament in which Kentucky won. The game was not as easy for the Wildcats like it was in the opening round game against Hampton. Kentucky shot just 37 percent and was outrebounded 45 to 38 yet always seemed in control because of timely baskets and rebounds that Cincinnati failed to get. The physical, pesky Bearcats made the Wildcats work hard for every shot and rebound in an intense contest. Yet the Wildcats succeeded by making life difficult on both ends for Cincinnati, holding the Bearcats to 32 percent shooting including just 24 percent in the second half. Kentucky blocked six shots after halftime and nine overall while also coming up with key rebounds. Kentucky outlasted Cincinnati's physicality, defeating the Bearcats 64 to 51 en route to the Sweet 16.

==== Midwest Regional semifinals ====
On March 21, 4th-seeded Maryland faced off against 5th-seeded West Virginia. The Mountaineers defeated the Terrapins 69–59 to set up a match-up against Kentucky in the Sweet 16 in Cleveland. Prior to the game on March 26, West Virginia guard Daxter Miles Jr. guaranteed that the Mountaineers would hand the Wildcats their first loss of the season, claiming the Wildcats were going to be 36–1. The comment by Miles made ESPN's SportsCenter prior to the game and created a lot of commentary prior to the game about the Mountaineers chances against the Wildcats. The commentary by the West Virginia player only fueled the Kentucky players. Within the first eight minutes, Kentucky built an 18 to 2 lead. Rendering West Virginia's full-court pressure wholly ineffective, UK committed just 10 turnovers for the game and shot a scalding 60.9 percent from the field in building an insurmountable 44–18 lead. The Mountaineers, meanwhile, were flummoxed on offense. They shot 24.1 percent from the field for the game and at one point had made just 5-of-37 attempts. All told, they managed just 0.582 points per possession and their 39 points were a season low. UK, meanwhile, blocked seven shots. Six players combined for UK's 13 assists on 24 made field goals, while more good passes helped lead to the Cats' 31 free-throw attempts, of which they hit 26. Trey Lyles hit 6-of-7 tries from the line in pacing UK with 14 points, while Andrew Harrison scored nine of his 13 points at the line. Kentucky defeated West Virginia 78–39, tying the largest margin of victory ever in a regional semifinal.

==== Midwest Regional Finals ====
On March 26, 3rd-seeded Notre Dame faced off against Wichita State for a berth to the Elite Eight. Notre Dame defeated Wichita State 81 to 70 to set up a meeting with Kentucky two nights later. On March 28 Kentucky and Notre Dame met for a berth to the Final Four. In a game that was considered one of the greatest in NCAA tournament history, Kentucky defeated Notre Dame 68–66. Kentucky needed its players to step up in a big game with such high stakes. Towns was foremost among players stepping up when it mattered most. The 6-foot-11 forward played through foul trouble to score nine of his career-best 25 points over that final stretch, including the game-tying basket in the post with 1:12 left. The big 3 came with 3:15 on the clock. The Cats, in the midst of a rally after previously trailing by six points with 6:14 to go, trailed by just two when Aaron Harrison pulled up from the right wing. With six seconds left in an Elite Eight matchup with Notre Dame, Andrew Harrison drove and drew a foul on Notre Dame's Demetrius Jackson. Following a timeout called by the Fighting Irish, he toed the line in a 66–66 game and sank two free throws to give Kentucky a two-point lead. The margin remained intact as Notre Dame's Jerian Grant missed a contested 3-pointer as time expired. The game between Kentucky and Notre Dame was the highest rated college basketball game on cable of all time.

==== National semifinal ====
On March 26, 1-seeded Wisconsin defeated 2-seeded Arizona 85–78 for a berth to the Final Four. This set up a re-match between Kentucky and Wisconsin at the Final Four, this time in Indianapolis. On April 4, Kentucky and Wisconsin faced off for a berth to the National Championship game against Duke. The Wildcats, once trailing by nine points in the first half and eight early in the second, were poised to close out another opponent in the final minutes, this time in the Final Four. With an 8 to 0 run and their defense holding Wisconsin scoreless for more than six minutes, the Cats grabbed a 60–56 lead with less than five minutes remaining. The Badgers reeled off an 8 to 0 run of their own that Sam Dekker started. Next, Nigel Hayes tied the game with a put-back. It was the last of Wisconsin's 12 offensive rebounds and 13 second-chance points. The Badgers' 71–64 upset victory increased the perfect season drought to 39 years.

=== Results ===
Date time, TV	Rank^{#}	Opponent^{#}	Result	Record	High points	High rebounds	High assists	Site (attendance) city, state
Exhibition
Aug 10*; 1:00 pm, ESPNU		vs. Puerto Rico Reserve	W 74–49	–	19 – Aa. Harrison	7 – Towns	5 – Ulis	Imperial Arena (–); Nassau, BAH
Aug 11*; 1:00 pm, ESPNU		vs. Champagne Châlons-Reims	W 81–58	–	19 – Towns	10 – Towns	5 – An. Harrison	Imperial Arena (–); Nassau, BAH
Aug 12*; 1:00 pm, ESPNU		vs. Puerto Rico Reserve	W 93–57	–	15 – Poythress	10 – Poythress	6 – An. Harrison	Imperial Arena (–); Nassau, BAH
Aug 15*; 1:00 pm, SECN		vs. Dominican Republic	W 83–71	–	20 – Poythress	12 – Johnson	6 – An. Harrison	Imperial Arena (–); Nassau, BAH
Aug 16*; 1:00 pm, SECN		vs. Champagne Châlons-Reims	W 77–72	–	15 – Aa. Harrison	8 – Johnson	7 – An. Harrison	Imperial Arena (–); Nassau, BAH
Aug 17*; 1:00 pm, SECN		vs. Dominican Republic	L 62–63	–	12 – Ulis	9 – Johnson	5 – Ulis	Imperial Arena (–); Nassau, BAH
Nov 2*; 7:00 pm, SECN	No. 1	Pikeville	W 116–68	–	22 – Towns	8 – Tied	9 – An. Harrison	Rupp Arena (21,036); Lexington, Kentucky
Nov 9*; 7:00 pm, SECN	No. 1	Georgetown (KY)	W 121–52	–	17 – Aa. Harrison	10 – Johnson	6 – An. Harrison	Rupp Arena (21,490); Lexington, Kentucky
Non-conference regular season
Nov 14*; 8:00 pm, SECN	No. 1	Grand Canyon; Cawood Ledford Classic	W 85–45	1–0	16 – An. Harrison	13 – Johnson	3 – Tied	Rupp Arena (22,533); Lexington, Kentucky
Nov 16*; Noon, ESPNU	No. 1	Buffalo; Cawood Ledford Classic	W 71–52	2–0	12 – Tied	12 – Johnson	6 – Ulis	Rupp Arena (22,175); Lexington, Kentucky
Nov 18*; 9:00 pm, ESPN	No. 1	vs. No. 5 Kansas; Champions Classic	W 72–40	3–0	11 – Johnson	10 – Cauley-Stein	4 – An. Harrison	Bankers Life Fieldhouse (19,306); Indianapolis
Nov 21*; 7:00 pm, FSN	No. 1	Boston University	W 89–65	4–0	19 – Aa. Harrison	6 – Johnson	7 – Booker	Rupp Arena (22,485); Lexington, Kentucky
Nov 23*; 6:00 pm, SECN	No. 1	Montana State; Cawood Ledford Classic	W 86–28	5–0	18 – Booker	10 – Towns	5 – Ulis	Rupp Arena (22,384); Lexington, Kentucky
Nov 25*; 7:00 pm, SECN	No. 1	UT-Arlington; Cawood Ledford Classic	W 92–44	6–0	19 – Booker	11 – Towns	5 – Ulis	Rupp Arena (22,639); Lexington, Kentucky
Nov 30*; 2:00 pm, ESPN2	No. 1	Providence	W 58–38	7–0	11 – Tied	6 – Tied	4 – Tied	Rupp Arena (23,601); Lexington, Kentucky
Dec 5*; 7:00 pm, ESPN	No. 1	No. 6 Texas; Big 12/SEC Challenge	W 63–51	8–0	21 – Cauley-Stein	12 – Cauley-Stein	4 – Tied	Rupp Arena (24,340); Lexington, Kentucky
Dec 7*; 6:00 pm, SECN	No. 1	Eastern Kentucky	W 82–49	9–0	19 – Towns	10 – Lyles	6 – Tied	Rupp Arena (23,268); Lexington, Kentucky
Dec 10*; 7:00 pm, ESPN2	No. 1	Columbia	W 56–46	10–0	14 – Aa. Harrison	10 – Tied	3 – Tied	Rupp Arena (22,112); Lexington, Kentucky
Dec 13*; Noon, CBS	No. 1	No. 21 North Carolina; Rivalry	W 84–70	11–0	15 – Tied	6 – Cauley-Stein	8 – Ulis	Rupp Arena (24,406); Lexington, Kentucky
Dec 20*; 3:30 pm, CBS	No. 1	vs. UCLA; CBS Sports Classic	W 83–44	12–0	19 – Booker	10 – Towns	8 – An. Harrison	United Center (19,726); Chicago
Dec 27*; 2:00 pm, ESPN2	No. 1	at No. 4 Louisville; Battle for the Bluegrass	W 58–50	13–0	14 – Ulis	9 – Tied	4 – Tied	KFC Yum! Center (22,812); Louisville, Kentucky
SEC regular season
Jan 6; 7:00 pm, SECN	No. 1	Ole Miss	W 89–86 ^{OT}	14–0 (1–0)	26 – Aa. Harrison	12 – Cauley-Stein	7 – Ulis	Rupp Arena (24,275); Lexington, Kentucky
Jan 10; 1:00 pm, CBS	No. 1	at Texas A&M	W 70–64 ^{2OT}	15–0 (2–0)	18 – Booker	9 – Tied	5 – An. Harrison	Reed Arena (10,411); College Station, Texas
Jan 13; 9:00 pm, ESPN	No. 1	Missouri	W 86–37	16–0 (3–0)	16 – Aa. Harrison	10 – Towns	3 – Tied	Rupp Arena (24,248); Lexington, Kentucky
Jan 17; 4:00 pm, ESPN	No. 1	at Alabama	W 70–48	17–0 (4–0)	13 – Booker	5 – Tied	3 – Tied	Coleman Coliseum (15,383); Tuscaloosa, AL
Jan 20; 9:00 pm, SECN	No. 1	Vanderbilt	W 65–57	18–0 (5–0)	14 – Aa. Harrison	10 – Cauley-Stein	4 – Tied	Rupp Arena (24,249); Lexington, Kentucky
Jan 24; Noon, ESPN	No. 1	at South Carolina	W 58–43	19–0 (6–0)	18 – Booker	6 – Johnson	6 – Ulis	Colonial Life Arena (18,000); Columbia, South Carolina
Jan 29; 9:00 pm, ESPN	No. 1	at Missouri	W 69–53	20–0 (7–0)	15 – An. Harrison	7 – Johnson	3 – An. Harrison	Mizzou Arena (13,034); Columbia, Missouri
Jan 31; 7:00 pm, SECN	No. 1	Alabama	W 70–55	21–0 (8–0)	12 – Tied	5 – Lee	4 – Ulis	Rupp Arena (24,351); Lexington, Kentucky
Feb 3; 7:00 pm, ESPNU	No. 1	Georgia	W 69–58	22–0 (9–0)	23 – An. Harrison	13 – Towns	7 – An. Harrison	Rupp Arena (24,256); Lexington, Kentucky
Feb 7; 9:00 pm, ESPN	No. 1	at Florida; Rivalry; College GameDay	W 68–61	23–0 (10–0)	23 – Aa. Harrison	8 – Towns	5 – Ulis	O'Connell Center (12,578); Gainesville, Florida
Feb 10; 7:00 pm, ESPN	No. 1	at LSU	W 71–69	24–0 (11–0)	15 – Cauley-Stein	13 – Towns	4 – An. Harrison	Maravich Center (13,997); Baton Rouge, Louisiana
Feb 14; 2:00 pm, ESPN	No. 1	South Carolina	W 77–43	25–0 (12–0)	14 – Cauley-Stein	13 – Johnson	6 – An. Harrison	Rupp Arena (24,305); Lexington, Kentucky
Feb 17; 7:00 pm, ESPN	No. 1	at Tennessee; Rivalry	W 66–48	26–0 (13–0)	18 – Booker	7 – Tied	6 – Ulis	Thompson–Boling Arena (21,678); Knoxville, Tennessee
Feb 21; 7:00 pm, ESPN	No. 1	Auburn	W 110–75	27–0 (14–0)	19 – Towns	10 – Towns	9 – An. Harrison	Rupp Arena (23,403); Lexington, Kentucky
Feb 25; 7:00 pm, SECN	No. 1	at Mississippi State	W 74–56	28–0 (15–0)	18 – Lyles	10 – Towns	4 – Ulis	Humphrey Coliseum (6,795); Starkville, Mississippi
Feb 28; 4:00 pm, CBS	No. 1	No. 18 Arkansas	W 84–67	29–0 (16–0)	18 – Tied	9 – Cauley-Stein	3 – Tied	Rupp Arena (24,416); Lexington, Kentucky
Mar 3; 9:00 pm, ESPN	No. 1	at Georgia	W 72–64	30–0 (17–0)	19 – Towns	7 – Towns	4 – Ulis	Stegeman Coliseum (10,523); Athens, Georgia
Mar 7; 2:00 pm, CBS	No. 1	Florida; Rivalry; Senior day	W 67–50	31–0 (18–0)	14 – Lyles	9 – Towns	3 – Towns	Rupp Arena (24,428); Lexington, Kentucky
SEC tournament
Mar 13; 1:00 pm, SECN	(1) No. 1	vs. (8) Florida; Quarterfinals	W 64–49	32–0	13 – Tied	12 – Towns	4 – Ulis	Bridgestone Arena (18,205); Nashville, Tennessee
Mar 14; 1:00 pm, ESPN	(1) No. 1	vs. (13) Auburn; Semifinals	W 91–67	33–0	18 – Cauley-Stein	7 – Cauley-Stein	6 – Ulis	Bridgestone Arena (19,232); Nashville, Tennessee
Mar 15; 1:00 pm, ESPN	(1) No. 1	vs. (2) No. 21 Arkansas; Championship game	W 78–63	34–0	15 – Tied	10 – Cauley-Stein	6 – Tied	Bridgestone Arena (20,315); Nashville, Tennessee
NCAA tournament
Mar 19*; 9:40 pm, CBS	(1 MW) No. 1	vs. (16 MW) Hampton; Second Round	W 79–56	35–0	21 – Towns	11 – Tied	3 – Tied	KFC Yum! Center (21,639); Louisville, Kentucky
Mar 21*; 2:40 pm, CBS	(1 MW) No. 1	vs. (8 MW) Cincinnati; Third Round	W 64–51	36–0	13 – Aa. Harrison	11 – Lyles	5 – Ulis	KFC Yum! Center (21,760); Louisville, Kentucky
Mar 26*; 9:45 pm, CBS	(1 MW) No. 1	vs. (5 MW) No. 20 West Virginia; Sweet Sixteen	W 78–39	37–0	14 – Lyles	10 – Cauley-Stein	4 – Ulis	Quicken Loans Arena (19,465); Cleveland, Ohio
Mar 28*; 8:45 pm, TBS	(1 MW) No. 1	vs. (3 MW) No. 8 Notre Dame; Elite Eight	W 68–66	38–0	25 – Towns	5 – Tied	4 – Towns	Quicken Loans Arena (19,464); Cleveland, Ohio
Apr 4*; 8:45 pm, TBS	(1 MW) No. 1	vs. (1 W) No. 3 Wisconsin; Final Four	L 64–71	38–1	16 – Towns	9 – Towns	4 – An. Harrison	Lucas Oil Stadium (72,238); Indianapolis, Indiana
*Non-conference game. ^{#}Rankings from AP Poll. (#) Tournament seedings in parentheses. MW=Midwest region, W=West region. All times are in Eastern Time.

== Statistics ==
The team posted the following statistics:

Name	GP	GS	Min.	Avg.	FG	FGA	FG%	3FG	3FGA	3FG%	FT	FTA	FT%	OR	DR	RB	Avg.	PF	DQ	Ast.	TO	Blk.	Stl.	Pts.	Avg.
Aaron Harrison	39	38	1,005	25.8	146	370	0.395	59	187	0.316	79	101	0.782	15	85	100	2.6	61	2	55	35	6	43	430	11.0
Karl-Anthony Towns	39	39	822	21.1	145	256	0.566	2	8	0.250	109	134	0.813	92	169	261	6.7	115	6	44	53	88	18	401	10.3
Devin Booker	38	0	817	21.5	135	287	0.470	58	141	0.411	53	64	0.828	17	59	76	2.0	58	0	42	37	2	17	381	10.0
Andrew Harrison	39	39	994	25.5	101	267	0.378	36	94	0.383	126	159	0.792	13	74	87	2.2	70	0	139	64	8	40	364	9.3
Willie Cauley-Stein	39	38	1,012	25.9	135	236	0.572	0	0	0.000	79	128	0.617	89	162	251	6.4	78	2	38	48	67	47	349	8.9
Dakari Johnson	39	0	635	16.3	79	156	0.506	0	0	0.000	90	144	0.625	67	112	179	4.6	69	1	29	42	36	14	248	6.4
Tyler Ulis	37	0	882	23.8	67	165	0.406	33	77	0.429	42	52	0.808	16	51	67	1.8	56	0	135	38	2	37	209	5.6
Alex Poythress	8	8	882	20.3	16	42	0.381	0	7	0.000	12	14	0.857	12	18	30	3.8	17	1	2	8	12	4	44	5.5
Marcus Lee	39	0	425	10.9	47	73	0.644	0	0	0.000	8	25	0.320	47	60	107	2.7	61	1	12	18	27	3	102	2.6
Derek Willis	19	0	75	3.9	7	18	0.389	5	15	0.333	6	6	1.000	5	9	14	0.7	5	0	5	8	3	2	25	1.3
Dominique Hawkins	23	9	163	7.1	10	35	0.286	5	21	0.238	4	10	0.400	3	13	16	0.7	14	0	14	5	1	7	29	1.3
Tod Lanter	7	1	8	1.1	1	1	1.000	1	1	1.000	0	0	0.000	0	0	0	0.0	0	0	0	0	0	0	3	0.4
Sam Malone	8	1	11	1.4	0	1	0.000	0	0	0.000	1	2	0.500	1	2	3	0.4	0	0	0	1	0	0	1	0.1
E.J. Floreal	13	0	20	1.5	0	1	0.000	0	0	0.000	1	2	0.500	0	1	1	0.1	2	0	0	4	0	1	1	0.1
Brian Long	10	1	16	1.6	0	2	0.000	0	2	0.000	0	0	0.000	0	0	0	0.0	2	0	0	0	0	1	0	0.0
TEAM	39													49	53	102	2.7	0			6			0	
Season Total	39	—	7,875	—	1,006	2,150	0.468	203	582	0.349	685	943	0.726	491	991	1,482	38.0	665	13	553	408	268	253	2,900	74.4
Opponents	39	—	7,875	—	750	2,116	0.354	175	646	0.271	443	672	0.659	463	752	1,215	31.2	778	—	301	533	94	182	2,118	54.3

== Honors ==
=== Watch lists ===
Willie Cauley-Stein and Karl-Anthony Towns were two of four SEC players (with Jordan Mickey and Bobby Portis) named to the 30-man Naismith College Player of the Year midseason watchlist. Cauley-Stein and Portis were two of 15 finalists for the John R. Wooden Award, Devin Booker and Towns were named as finalists for the Wayman Tisdale Award.

=== Weekly awards ===
On November 17 Lyles was named Freshman of the Week by the SEC after 14 points and four rebounds performance in his career debut against Grand Canyon and 12 points, four rebounds and three assists in the win over Buffalo. On December 1 and December 8 Towns was named Freshman of the Week by the SEC after averaging 13 points, 7.5 rebounds in wins over UT Arlington, Providence, Texas, and Eastern Kentucky. On December 22 Booker was named Freshman of the Week by the SEC after scoring a game-high 19 points in Kentucky's 83–44 victory over UCLA. On December 29 Ulis became the fourth Wildcat to be named Freshman of the Week by the SEC after he scored a career-high 14 points against Louisville. A day later Ulis was honored on the national level by being named Wayman Tisdale Freshman of the Week by the USBWA following his performance against Louisville.

=== SEC awards ===
Cauley-Stein and Towns were unanimous first-team All-SEC selections by coaches and the media. Devin Booker and Aaron Harrison were second-team All-SEC selections from the coaches and the media. Towns was the SEC Freshman of the Year, and he, Booker, Lyles, and Ulis were All-Freshman team selections by the coaches and media. Towns became the sixth straight Wildcat to be named SEC Freshman of the Year (Cousins, Knight, Davis, Noel, Randle). Calipari was named SEC Coach of the Year by the coaches media. Cauley-Stein, Andrew Harrison, and Aaron Harrison were named to the 2015 SEC All-Tournament Team, and Cauley-Stein was named MVP of the tournament.

=== National District awards ===
Cauley-Stein was named District IV (Kentucky, Tennessee, Mississippi, Alabama, Georgia and Florida) Player of the Year, Calipari was named District IV Coach of the Year and Booker, Cauley-Stein, Aaron Harrison, and Towns were named to the All-District IV team by the USBWA. Cauley-Stein and Towns were listed on the National Association of Basketball Coaches Division I All-District 21 first team, while Booker was listed on the second team on March 12.

=== All-American and National awards ===
Cauley-Stein was a consensus first-team All-American, and Towns was a consensus second-team All-American. The Associated Press named Cauley-Stein as a first-team All-American, and Towns as a second-team All-American. The USBWA named Cauley-Stein a first-team All-American. The NABC named Cauley-Stein a first-team All-American and Towns a second-team All-American. The Sporting News named Cauley-Stein a first-team All-American and Towns a third-team All-American. The AP, NABC, Naismith, Sporting News also named Calipari the National Coach of the Year. The NABC named Cauley-Stein its NABC Defensive Player of the Year.

== Rankings ==
Ranking movements Legend: ██ Increase in ranking ██ Decrease in ranking
	Week																			
Poll	Pre	2	3	4	5	6	7	8	9	10	11	12	13	14	15	16	17	18	19	Final
AP	1	1	1	1	1	1	1	1	1	1	1	1	1	1	1	1	1	1	1	
Coaches	1	1	1	1	1	1	1	1	1	1	1	1	1	1	1	1	1	1	1	3

== 2015 NBA draft ==
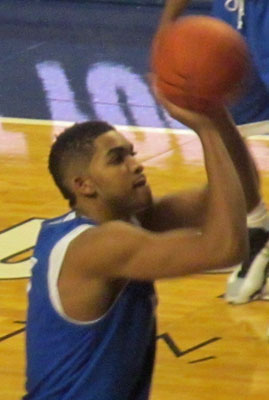
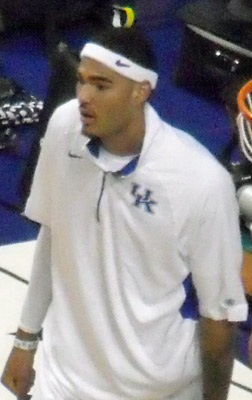
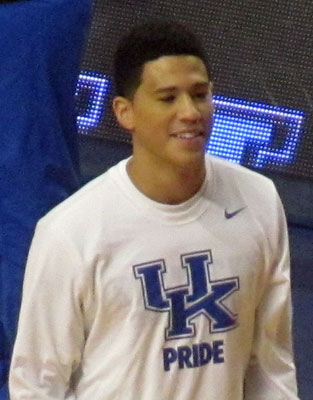
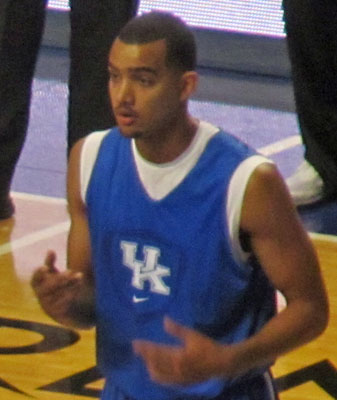
Karl-Anthony Towns, Willie Cauley-Stein, Devin Booker, and Trey Lyles (left to right) were selected 1st, 6th, 13th and 12th, respectively, in the 2015 NBA draft.

On April 9 UK held a press conference for all players that intended to declare for the 2015 NBA draft. Seven players declared themselves eligible for the draft: Booker, Cauley-Stein, the Harrison twins (Aaron and Andrew), Johnson, Lyles, and Towns. Leading up to the draft Towns, Cauley-Stein, Booker and Lyles were projected as lottery picks. The Harrison twins and Johnson were projected as second-round draft picks. Towns was projected to be the number one overall pick to the Minnesota Timberwolves.

In the draft Towns was selected No. 1 by Minnesota. He was followed by Cauley-Stein, who went to the Sacramento Kings at No. 6; Lyles, who was taken by the Utah Jazz at No. 12; and Booker, who was chosen No. 13 by the Phoenix Suns. In the second round Andrew Harrison was taken No. 44 by the Suns and traded to the Memphis Grizzlies, while Johnson went 48th overall to the Oklahoma City Thunder. Towns became the third player (Davis and Wall) in Kentucky history taken first in the draft. The four players taken in the lottery tied the record for most players taken from one school in the lottery (North Carolina, 2005).

=== NBA draft selections ===
Year	Round	Pick	Overall	Player	NBA club
2015	1	1	1	Karl-Anthony Towns	Minnesota Timberwolves
2015	1	6	6	Willie Cauley-Stein	Sacramento Kings
2015	1	12	12	Trey Lyles	Utah Jazz
2015	1	13	13	Devin Booker	Phoenix Suns
2015	2	14	44	Andrew Harrison	Phoenix Suns
2015	2	18	48	Dakari Johnson	Oklahoma City Thunder

== See also ==
- 2014–15 Kentucky Wildcats women's basketball team
- 2015 NCAA Division I men's basketball tournament
