= Moss Point High School =

Mississippi high school

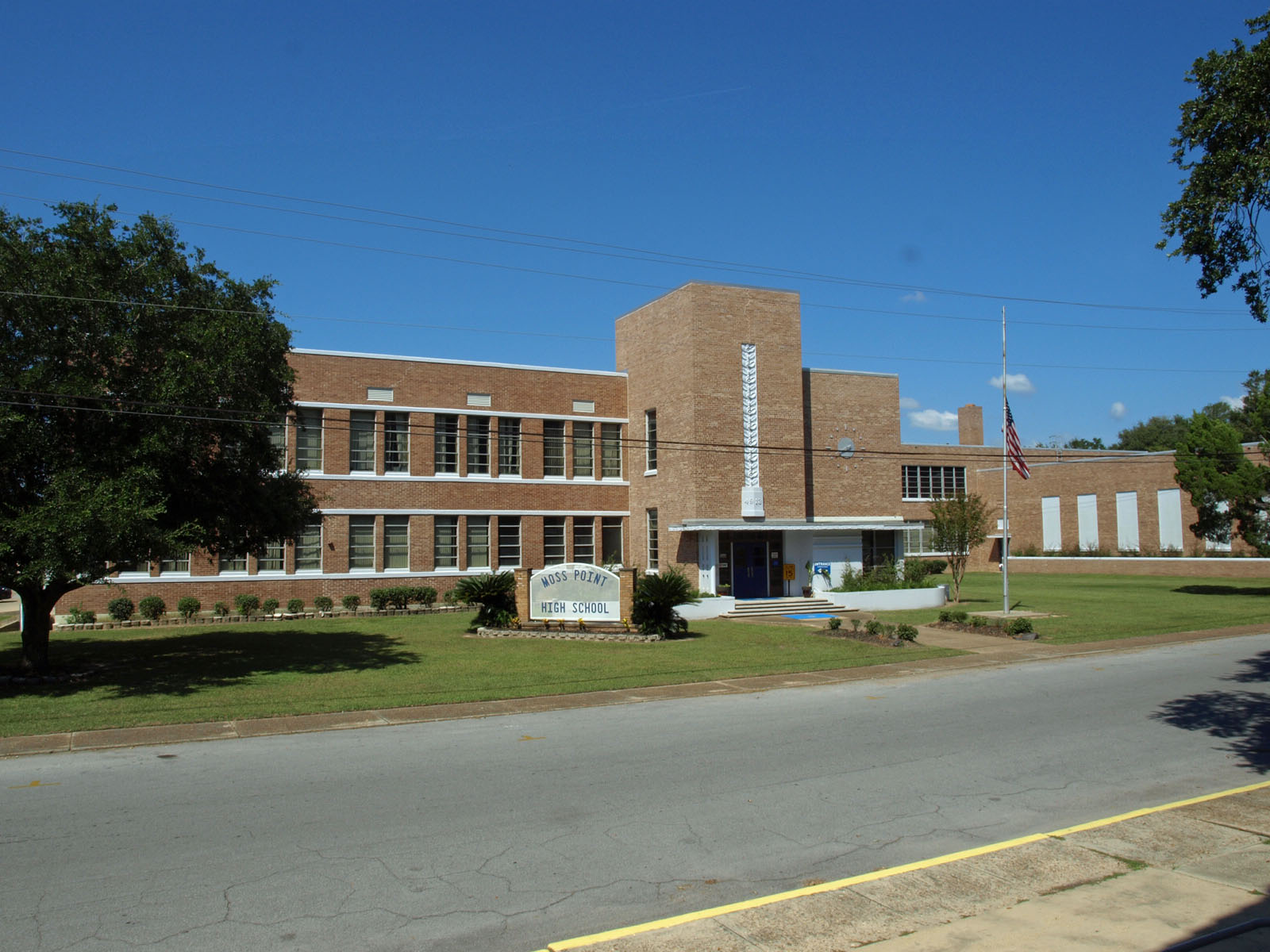
- Moss Point High School, September 2012

Location
- 4913 Weems Street; Moss Point, Mississippi 39563; United States
- 30°24′47″N 88°32′58″W

Information
- Type: Public secondary school
- School district: Moss Point School District
- Principal: Otis Gaines 2024- Present
- Teaching staff: 40.54 (on an FTE basis)
- Grades: 9-12
- Enrollment: 493 (2023-2024)
- Student to teacher ratio: 12.16
- Colors: Navy, grey and white
- Nickname: Tigers
- Website: mphs.mpsdnow.org
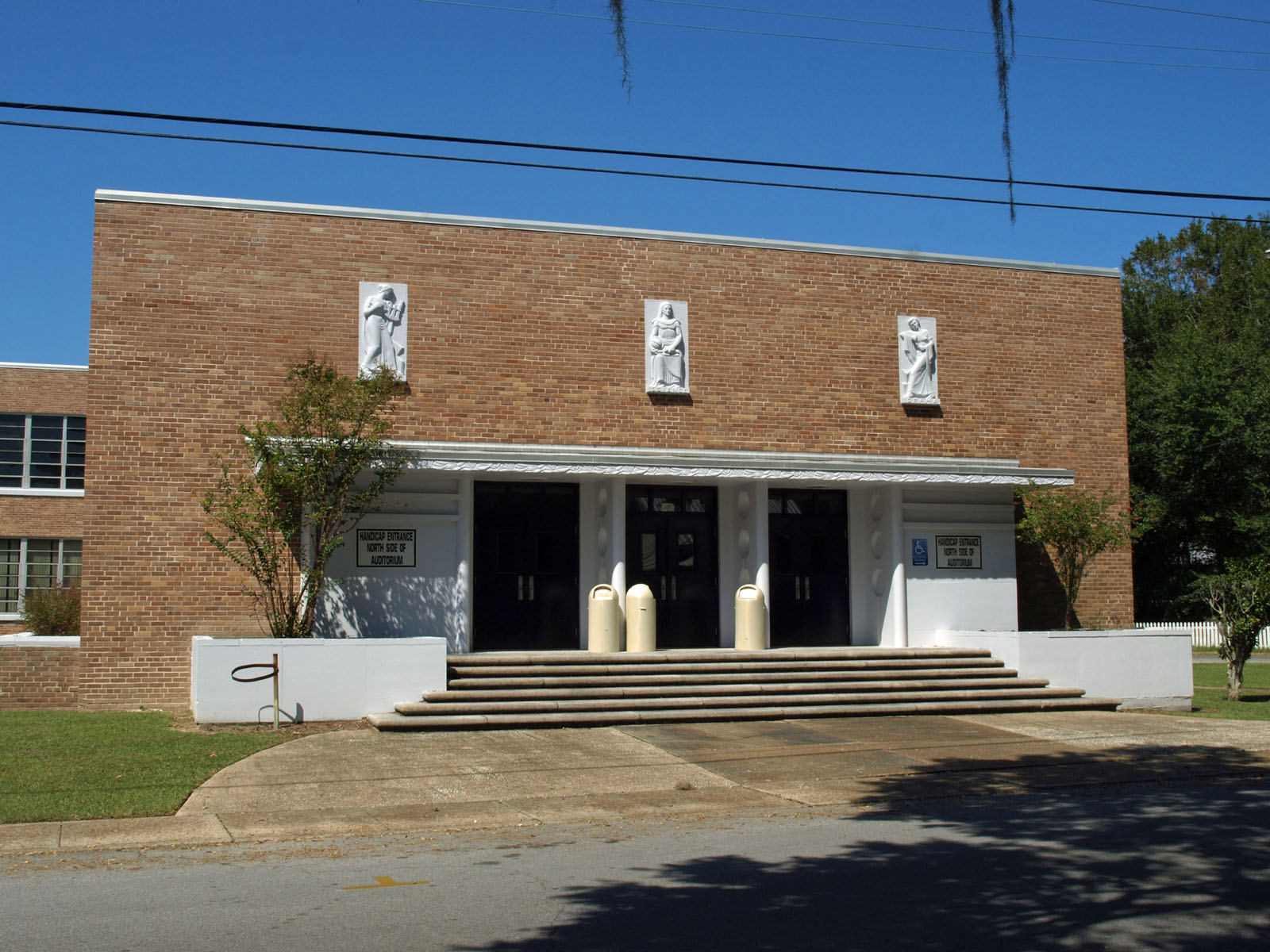
- Moss Point High School Auditorium

Moss Point High School is a public high school in Moss Point, Mississippi, United States. It is part of the Moss Point School District.

== History ==
Moss Point High School was established in 1883 in a two-story schoolhouse. Tuition was required. There was also a Moss Point Academy.

In 1941, a two-story art deco school building was constructed on the school's campus as part of a Works Project Administration (WPA) project.

During segregation, Moss Point High School was an all-white school. Magnolia High School served the area's African American students. Magnolia High School's team name were the Monarchs, with the school colors being purple and gold. Magnolia High School closed in the 1970s. After desegregation Magnolia became a Junior High School. There was a violent confrontation at Moss Point High School and dozens of police responded.

In 1999, Jesse Jackson was photographed during a visit to the school.

== Academics ==
Moss Point was ranked 105th in Mississippi and 11,634th nationally in the 2021 U.S. News & World Report annual ranking of public high schools.

== Demographics ==
The demographic breakdown of the 476 students enrolled for school year 2020-21 was:

- Asian - 0.2%
- Black - 78.6%
- Hispanic - 4 2%
- Male - 50.4%
- Native Hawaiian/Pacific islanders - 0.2%
- White - 14.5%
- Multiracial - 2.3%
- Female - 49.6%

For 2020-21, Moss Point was a Title I school with 100% of its students eligible for free lunch.

== Athletics ==
Moss Point High School's team name are the Tigers, with the school colors being navy blue, grey and white. The school's football team has won several state championships and has had 18 alumni play in the NFL.

== Notable alumni ==
- Eric Austin, NFL safety
- Verlon Biggs, NFL defensive end
- Damarius Bilbo, sports agent
- Devin Booker, NBA player
- Melvin Booker, NBA player
- John F. Brock, corporate executive of Coca-Cola Enterprises
- Isaiah Canaan, NBA player
- Ray Costict, NFL linebacker
- Wendell Davis, NFL tight end
- Ken Farragut, NFL center and linebacker
- Kevin Fant, former college football quarterback for the Mississippi State Bulldogs
- Litterial Green, NBA player
- LeRoy Hurd, professional basketball player
- Alcender Jackson, NFL offensive lineman
- Gerald Jackson, NFL defensive back
- Jack Jackson, NFL wide receiver
- Kenny Johnson, NFL defensive back and return specialist
- Tom Johnson, NFL defensive tackle
- Ed Khayat, NFL defensive lineman and head coach
- Robert Khayat, University of Mississippi Chancellor and former NFL player
- Aubrey Matthews, NFL wide receiver
- Sharon Caples McDougle, spacesuit technician for NASA
- Toni Seawright, actress and singer-songwriter
- Tony Sipp, MLB pitcher
- George Wonsley, NFL running back
- Nathan Wonsley, NFL running back
- Otis Wonsley, NFL running back
