= Eric Austin (American football) =

American football player (born 1973)

No. 27
- Position: Safety

Personal information
- Born: June 7, 1973 (age 53); Moss Point, Mississippi, U.S.
- Listed height: 5 ft 10 in (1.78 m)
- Listed weight: 217 lb (98 kg)

Career information
- High school: Moss Point
- College: Jackson State (1991–1995)
- NFL draft: 1996: 4th round, 104th overall pick

Career history
- Tampa Bay Buccaneers (1996)
- Stats at Pro Football Reference

Eric Dewayne Austin (born June 7, 1973) is an American former professional football player who was a safety for one season with the Tampa Bay Buccaneers of the National Football League (NFL). He played college football for the Jackson State Tigers and was selected by the Buccaneers in the fourth round of the 1996 NFL draft.

== Early life and college ==
Eric Dewayne Austin was born on June 7, 1973, in Moss Point, Mississippi. He attended Moss Point High School in Moss Point.

He was a member of the Jackson State Tigers from 1991 to 1995. He was redshirted in 1991.

== Professional career ==
Austin was selected by the Tampa Bay Buccaneers in the fourth round, with the 104th overall pick, of the 1996 NFL draft. He officially signed with the team on July 16. He played in two games on special teams for the Buccaneers during the 1996 season. He was inactive for the other 14 games of the season. Austin was listed as a safety while with the Buccaneers. He was released on August 18, 1997.
