= Wendell Davis (tight end) =

American football player (born 1975)

No. 81, 88, 89, 37
- Positions: Tight end, fullback

Personal information
- Born: October 24, 1975 (age 51); Escatawpa, Mississippi, U.S.
- Listed height: 6 ft 2 in (1.88 m)
- Listed weight: 246 lb (112 kg)

Career information
- High school: Moss Point (Moss Point, Mississippi)
- College: Mississippi Gulf Coast (1994–1995); Temple (1996–1997)
- NFL draft: 1998: undrafted

Career history

Playing
- San Diego Chargers (1998–2001); Rhein Fire (2000); Edmonton Eskimos (2002)

Coaching
- Christopher Newport (2004–2005) Running backs; Amsterdam Admirals (2005–2006) Running backs; Cologne Centurions (2007) Tight ends; Gannon (2008) Wide receivers; Christopher Newport (2010–2011) Running backs

Career NFL statistics
- Receptions: 4
- Receiving yards: 23
- Stats at Pro Football Reference

Career CFL statistics
- Rushing yards: 97
- Rushing average: 4.2
- Rushing touchdowns: 2
- Receiving yards: 64
- Return yards: 32

Wendell Davis (born October 24, 1975) is an American former professional football player who was a tight end and fullback in the National Football League (NFL) and Canadian Football League (CFL). He played college football for the Temple Owls. Professionally, he played in the NFL for the San Diego Chargers and Edmonton Eskimos of the CFL. After his playing career, Davis was an assistant coach for various college and NFL Europe teams for eight years.

== Early life and college career ==
Born in Escatawpa, Mississippi, Davis attended Moss Point High School in Moss Point, Mississippi. He began his college football career at Mississippi Gulf Coast Community College in 1994 and 1995, earning all-state honors both seasons. He transferred to Temple University and played for the Temple Owls in 1996 and 1997. With 11 starts, Davis had 19 receptions for 231 yards and two touchdowns for Temple.

== Professional football career ==
Following the 1998 NFL draft, Davis signed with the San Diego Chargers as an undrafted free agent on April 20, 1998. In what would be his only season with regular season NFL game action, Davis played in 11 games with seven starts for the Chargers, making four receptions for 23 yards.

Davis moved to fullback in 1999. The Chargers waived Davis on September 9, 1999, days before the regular season began, to free a roster spot for wide receiver Chris Penn.

In the spring of 2000, Davis signed with the Rhein Fire of NFL Europe. However, due to turf toe, he did not play in any games and was released three games into the season. Davis later signed with the San Diego Chargers on May 9, 2000. The Chargers released Davis on August 26, 2000, prior to the regular season.

On August 15, 2001, Davis signed again with the Chargers. He was released 12 days later.

In 2002, Davis played in 11 games for the Edmonton Eskimos at fullback. He had nine receptions for 64 yards, 23 carries for 97 yards and two touchdowns, three kick returns for 32 yards, and six tackles.

== Coaching career ==
Davis began his coaching career as running backs coach at Christopher Newport, an NCAA Division III school, working in that position in 2004 and 2005. In the 2005 and 2006 seasons, Davis was also running backs coach for the Amsterdam Admirals of NFL Europe. In 2007, Davis was tight ends coach for the Cologne Centurions in what was NFL Europe's final year of operation.

Returning to the college level, Davis was wide receivers coach at Gannon in 2008. He returned to Christopher Newport as running backs coach for the 2010 and 2011 seasons. He also completed his bachelor's degree at Virginia Commonwealth University.
