= Litterial Green =

American basketball player (born 1970)

Personal information
- Born: March 7, 1970 (age 55) Pascagoula, Mississippi, U.S.
- Listed height: 6 ft 1 in (1.85 m)
- Listed weight: 185 lb (84 kg)

Career information
- High school: Moss Point (Moss Point, Mississippi)
- College: Georgia (1988–1992)
- NBA draft: 1992: 2nd round, 39th overall pick
- Drafted by: Chicago Bulls
- Playing career: 1992–2002
- Position: Point guard
- Number: 11, 9, 12

Career history
- 1992–1994: Orlando Magic
- 1994–1996: Quad City Thunder
- 1996–1997: Detroit Pistons
- 1997–1998: Quad City Thunder
- 1998: Milwaukee Bucks
- 1998–1999: Quad City Thunder
- 1999: Cleveland Cavaliers
- 1999–2000: Marinos de Oriente
- 2000: Polluelos de Aibonito
- 2001: Egepen Altay
- 2001: Unia Tarnów
- 2001–2002: Zlatorog Laško

Career highlights
- First-team All-SEC – AP (1991); 2× Second-team All-SEC – AP (1990, 1992); McDonald's All-American (1988); Third-team Parade All-American (1988)
- Stats at NBA.com
- Stats at Basketball Reference

Litterial Maurice Green (born March 7, 1970) is an American former professional basketball player who played at the point guard position. He was listed at 6'1" or 6'2".

== Biography ==
Green played high school basketball at Moss Point High School in Mississippi, where he averaged 39.7 points per game as a senior to lead the nation in scoring. He also tallied 9.5 rebounds, 7.0 assists and 3.0 steals per game. He was a McDonald's All-American and a Parade Magazine All-American. In 1999, he was ranked #37 on Sports Illustrated's list of Mississippi's 50 Greatest Sports Figures.

Green played college basketball at the University of Georgia, where he became UGA's all-time leading scorer (2,111). He also became the school's all-time leader in assists. He led the Bulldogs to their first Southeastern Conference Championship in 1990, and was an All Southeastern Conference selection in 1990, 1991, and 1992. Green is the only basketball player in UGA history to score 2,000 points, and is one of three players in the history of the Southeastern Conference to record over 2000 points and 400 assists, joining Pete Maravich and Allan Houston.

Chosen in the second round of the 1992 NBA draft by the Chicago Bulls, Green played from 1992 to '94 for the Orlando Magic, as a backup to both Scott Skiles and Penny Hardaway. After a full season with the Detroit Pistons (1996–97), he signed with the Milwaukee Bucks in 1997–98 and the Cleveland Cavaliers in 1999, punctuated by spells with the Quad City Thunder in the Continental Basketball Association.

From 1999 to 2002, Green played overseas in Venezuela, Turkey, Poland and Slovenia.

In 2003, Green was hired to coach the Southern Crescent Lightning of the World Basketball Association. He won the league's Coach of the Year Award when his team won the league championship. He later served as the head coach of the Chattanooga Steamers of the American Basketball Association. Green has also worked for ESPN College Basketball as an analyst and has been a consultant to NBA teams.

== NBA career statistics ==
Legend
| GP | Games played | GS | Games started | MPG | Minutes per game |
| FG% | Field goal percentage | 3P% | 3-point field goal percentage | FT% | Free throw percentage |
| RPG | Rebounds per game | APG | Assists per game | SPG | Steals per game |
| BPG | Blocks per game | PPG | Points per game | **Bold** | Career high |

=== Regular season ===
| Year | Team | GP | GS | MPG | FG% | 3P% | FT% | RPG | APG | SPG | BPG | PPG |
|---|---|---|---|---|---|---|---|---|---|---|---|---|
| 1992–93 | Orlando | **52** | **4** | **12.0** | .439 | .100 | .625 | **0.7** | **2.2** | **0.4** | **0.1** | **4.5** |
| 1993–94 | Orlando | 29 | 0 | 4.3 | .386 | **.250** | **.757** | 0.4 | 0.3 | 0.2 | 0.0 | 2.5 |
| 1996–97 | Detroit | 45 | 0 | 6.9 | **.469** | .000 | .638 | 0.5 | 0.9 | **0.4** | 0.0 | 2.0 |
| 1997–98 | Milwaukee | 21 | 0 | 5.9 | .217 | .000 | .750 | 0.3 | 0.8 | 0.2 | 0.0 | 1.2 |
| 1998–99 | Cleveland | 1 | 0 | 2.0 | .000 | .000 | .000 | 0.0 | 0.0 | 0.0 | 0.0 | 0.0 |
| Career | | 148 | 4 | 8.0 | .420 | .077 | .665 | 0.5 | 1.2 | 0.3 | 0.0 | 2.9 |
