= Jack Jackson (American football) =

American football player (born 1972)

No. 88, 85
- Position: Wide receiver

Personal information
- Born: November 11, 1972 (age 53); Moss Point, Mississippi, U.S.
- Listed height: 5 ft 8 in (1.73 m)
- Listed weight: 174 lb (79 kg)

Career information
- High school: Moss Point
- College: Florida
- NFL draft: 1995: 4th round, 116th overall pick

Career history
- Chicago Bears (1995–1996); Toronto Argonauts (1997); Mobile Admirals (1999); Orlando Predators (1999); Carolina Cobras (2000); Florida Bobcats (2000)

Awards and highlights
- Consensus All-American (1994); SEC Player of the Year (1994); First-team All-SEC (1994); Second-team All-SEC (1993)

Career NFL statistics
- Receptions: 4
- Receiving yards: 39
- Return yards: 619
- Stats at Pro Football Reference
- Stats at ArenaFan.com

Elliott Cornelius Jackson Jr. (born November 11, 1972), nicknamed Jack Jackson, is an American former professional football player who was a wide receiver for four seasons in the National Football League (NFL) and Arena Football League (AFL). Jackson played college football for the Florida Gators, and earned consensus All-American honors in 1994. Thereafter, he played professionally for the Chicago Bears of the NFL, and also the Orlando Predators, Carolina Cobras and Florida Bobcats of the AFL.

== Early life ==
Jackson was born in Moss Point, Mississippi. He attended Moss Point High School, where he played high school football for the Moss Point Tigers.

== College career ==
Jackson received an athletic scholarship to attend the University of Florida in Gainesville, Florida, where he was a featured wide receiver for coach Steve Spurrier's Florida Gators football team from 1992 to 1994. Memorably, he had a 100-yard kick-off return for a touchdown against the Mississippi State Bulldogs in 1993, and led the nation with fifteen receiving touchdowns in 1994. He finished his college career with 143 catches for 2,266 yards (an average of 15.8 yards per reception) and twenty-nine touchdowns. Jackson was a first-team All-Southeastern Conference (SEC) selection, the SEC Offensive Player of the Year in 1994, and a consensus first-team All-American.

== Professional career ==
After his junior college season, Jackson decided to forgo his senior season and enter the NFL draft. He was chosen by the Chicago Bears in the fourth round (116th pick overall) of the 1995 NFL draft. He played for the Bears for two seasons.

In 1999, Jackson played for the Mobile Admirals of the short-lived Regional Football League. He also played two seasons in the Arena Football League, spending time with the Orlando Predators, Carolina Cobras and Florida Bobcats.

== See also ==
- 1994 College Football All-America Team
- Florida Gators football, 1990–99
- List of Chicago Bears players
- List of Florida Gators football All-Americans
- List of Florida Gators in the NFL draft
- List of NCAA major college football yearly receiving leaders
