= Helena, Mississippi =

- Census-designated place
- Location of Helena, Mississippi

- Location in the United States
- Coordinates: 30°29′13″N 88°30′17″W
- Country: United States
- State: Mississippi
- County: Jackson

Area
  - Total: 4.19 sq mi (10.85 km^{2})
  - Land: 4.19 sq mi (10.85 km^{2})
  - Water: 0 sq mi (0.00 km^{2})
- Elevation: 9.8 ft (3 m)

Population (2020)
  - Total: 983
  - Density: 234.7/sq mi (90.61/km^{2})
- Time zone: UTC-6 (Central (CST))
  - Summer (DST): UTC-5 (CDT)
- ZIP code: 39567
- Area code: 228
- FIPS code: 28-31460
- GNIS feature ID: 0671089

Helena is an unincorporated community and census-designated place (CDP) in Jackson County, Mississippi, United States. It is part of the Moss Point Metropolitan Statistical Area. Per the 2020 Census, the population was 983.

== History ==
A post office operated under the name Helena from 1910 to 1924.

== Geography ==
Helena is in eastern Jackson County, east of Escatawpa and north of Moss Point. Interstate 10 passes 4 miles (6 km) south of the community, and Pascagoula, the county seat, is 12 miles (19 km) to the southwest.

According to the United States Census Bureau, the Helena CDP has a total area of 4.2 square miles (10.8 km^{2}), all land.

== Demographics ==
Historical population
Census	Pop.	Note	%±
2000	778		—
2010	1,184		52.2%
2020	983		−17.0%
U.S. Decennial Census; 2010 2020

Helena was first listed as a census designated place in the 2000 U.S. census.

=== Racial and ethnic composition ===
Helena CDP, Mississippi – Racial and ethnic composition Note: the US Census treats Hispanic/Latino as an ethnic category. This table excludes Latinos from the racial categories and assigns them to a separate category. Hispanics/Latinos may be of any race.
Race / Ethnicity (NH = Non-Hispanic)	Pop 2000	Pop 2010	Pop 2020	% 2000	% 2010	% 2020
White alone (NH)	730	1,008	791	93.83%	85.14%	80.47%
Black or African American alone (NH)	40	121	89	5.14%	10.22%	9.05%
Native American or Alaska Native alone (NH)	0	0	3	0.00%	0.00%	0.31%
Asian alone (NH)	3	9	8	0.39%	0.76%	0.81%
Native Hawaiian or Pacific Islander alone (NH)	0	0	0	0.00%	0.00%	0.00%
Other race alone (NH)	0	0	5	0.00%	0.00%	0.51%
Mixed race or Multiracial (NH)	3	19	52	0.39%	1.60%	5.29%
Hispanic or Latino (any race)	2	27	35	0.26%	2.28%	3.56%
Total	778	1,184	983	100.00%	100.00%	100.00%

=== 2000 Census ===
As of the census of 2000, there were 778 people, 266 households, and 222 families residing in the CDP. The population density was 385.3 inhabitants per square mile (148.8/km^{2}). There were 280 housing units at an average density of 138.7 per square mile (53.6/km^{2}). The racial makeup of the CDP was 93.83% White, 5.14% African American, 0.39% Asian, 0.26% from other races, and 0.39% from two or more races. Hispanic or Latino of any race were 0.26% of the population.

There were 266 households, out of which 38.0% had children under the age of 18 living with them, 66.9% were married couples living together, 10.9% had a female householder with no husband present, and 16.5% were non-families. 14.3% of all households were made up of individuals, and 4.5% had someone living alone who was 65 years of age or older. The average household size was 2.92 and the average family size was 3.21.

In the CDP, the population was spread out, with 26.3% under the age of 18, 13.0% from 18 to 24, 26.9% from 25 to 44, 24.4% from 45 to 64, and 9.4% who were 65 years of age or older. The median age was 34 years. For every 100 females, there were 100.0 males. For every 100 females age 18 and over, there were 97.6 males.

The median income for a household in the CDP was $36,302, and the median income for a family was $36,302. Males had a median income of $31,588 versus $18,173 for females. The per capita income for the CDP was $12,346. About 6.2% of families and 5.2% of the population were below the poverty line, including 6.0% of those under age 18 and 17.9% of those age 65 or over.

== Education ==
Helena is served by the Moss Point School District, and students attend schools in Moss Point, Mississippi.

=== Schools ===
- Moss Point High School
- Magnolia Middle School
- Escatawpa Upper Elementary School (grades 3-5)
- Kreole Primary School (grades K-2)
