= Gerald Jackson (American football) =

No. 49
- Position: Defensive back

Personal information
- Born: March 5, 1956 (age 70); Moss Point, Mississippi, U.S.
- Listed height: 6 ft 1 in (1.85 m)
- Listed weight: 195 lb (88 kg)

Career information
- High school: Moss Point (Mississippi)
- College: Mississippi State (1975—1978)
- NFL draft: 1979: 10th round, 260th overall pick

Career history
- Kansas City Chiefs (1979); Baltimore Colts (1981)*
- * Offseason or practice squad member only

Career NFL statistics
- Interceptions: 1
- Stats at Pro Football Reference

Gerald Eugene Jackson (born March 5, 1956) is an American former professional football player who was a defensive back for one season with the Kansas City Chiefs of the National Football League (NFL). He played college football for the Mississippi State Bulldogs and was selected by the Chiefs in the tenth round of the 1979 NFL draft.

== Early life and college ==
Gerald Eugene Jackson was born on March 5, 1956, in Moss Point, Mississippi. He attended Moss Point High School.

Jackson was a four-year letterman for the Bulldogs of Mississippi State University from 1975 to 1978. He recorded three interceptions in 1978, three interceptions in 1977, and one interception in 1978.

== Professional career ==
Jackson was selected by the Kansas City Chiefs in the tenth round, with the 260th overall, of the 1979 NFL draft. He officially signed with the team on May 15. He played in all 16 games, starting three, during his rookie year in 1979 and recorded one interception. Jackson was released by the Chiefs on August 4, 1980.

Jackson signed with the Baltimore Colts in 1981. He was later released on August 17, 1981.
