= Tom Johnson (defensive tackle, born 1984) =

American gridiron football player (born 1984)

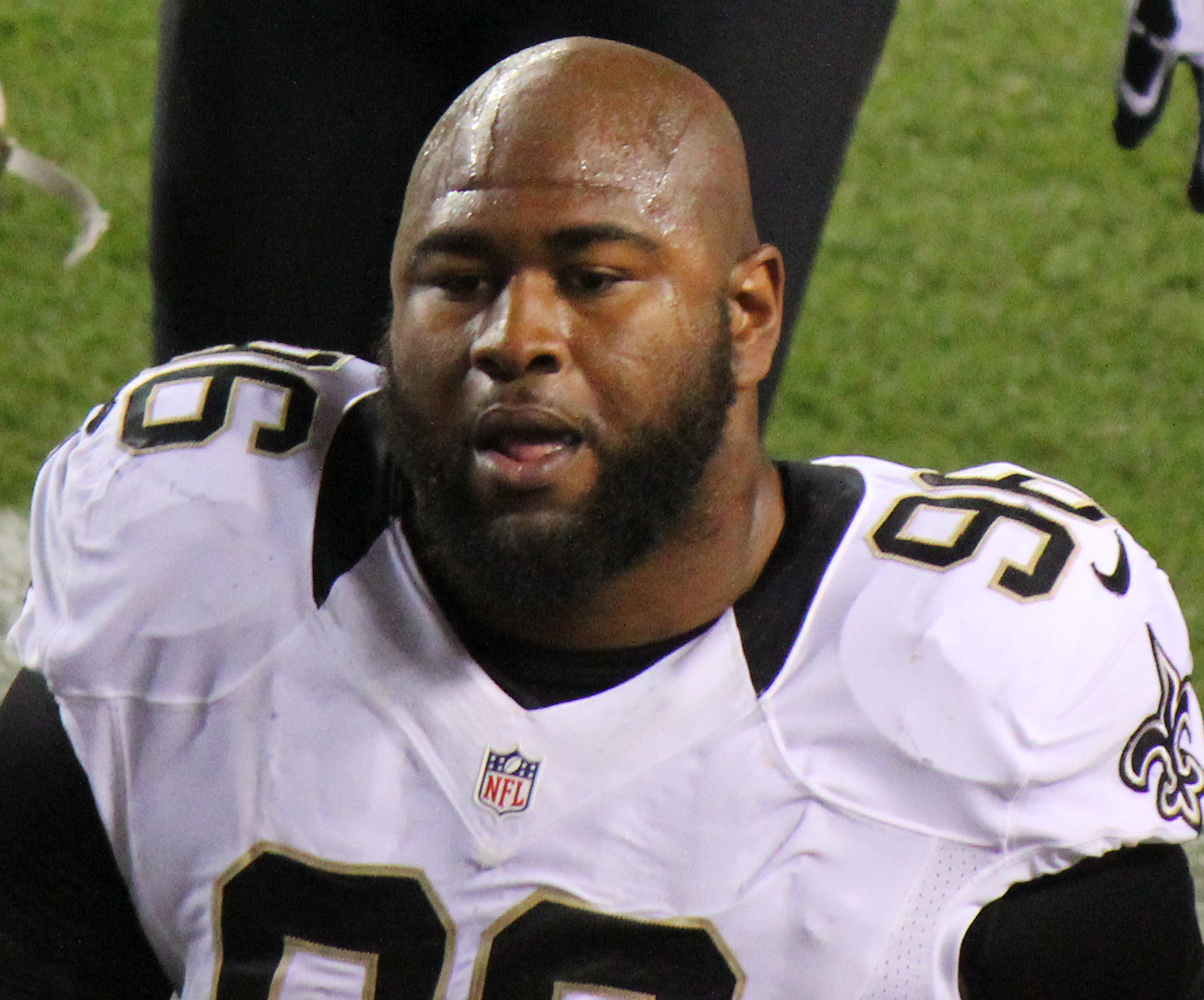
- Johnson with the New Orleans Saints in 2012

No. 96, 92, 91
- Position: Defensive tackle

Personal information
- Born: August 30, 1984 (age 42); Moss Point, Mississippi, U.S.
- Listed height: 6 ft 3 in (1.91 m)
- Listed weight: 288 lb (131 kg)

Career information
- High school: Moss Point
- College: Southern Miss
- NFL draft: 2006: undrafted

Career history
- Indianapolis Colts (2006–2007)*; Cologne Centurions (2007); Grand Rapids Rampage (2008); Philadelphia Soul (2008); Calgary Stampeders (2009–2010); New Orleans Saints (2011–2013); Minnesota Vikings (2014–2017); Seattle Seahawks (2018); Minnesota Vikings (2018)
- * Offseason or practice squad member only

Awards and highlights
- CFL West Division All-Star (2010); Second-team All-CUSA (2005)

Career NFL statistics
- Total tackles: 186
- Sacks: 25.5
- Forced fumbles: 2
- Interceptions: 1
- Stats at Pro Football Reference
- Stats at ArenaFan.com

Tom Johnson (born August 30, 1984), nicknamed Sebastian Thunderbucket, is an American former professional football player who was a defensive tackle in the National Football League (NFL). He attended Moss Point High School, where he played as a defensive tackle for two seasons. He played college football for the Southern Miss Golden Eagles but before that he played for two seasons of junior college football at Mississippi Gulf Coast Community College (MGCCC) in Perkinston, MS. Following his college career, Johnson went undrafted in the 2005 NFL draft. He was signed by the Indianapolis Colts as an undrafted free agent. He spent the 2007 season with the Cologne Centurions of the NFL Europe and came back with the Colts for training camp in 2008. After being released, he turned to the Arena Football League (AFL), where he played the 2008 season with the Grand Rapids Rampage and the Philadelphia Soul. Johnson then headed north to play in the Canadian Football League (CFL), where he played two seasons for the Calgary Stampeders and was named CFL West Division All-Star in 2010. At the end of the 2010 CFL season, Johnson drew interest from several NFL teams, and decided to sign with the New Orleans Saints, where he played from 2011 to 2013. In 2014, he became a free agent and joined the Minnesota Vikings on a one-year deal, and after exceeding expectations in his first season, he was re-signed to a three-year deal in 2015.

== Early life ==
Johnson played high school football under head coach Jerry Alexander at Moss Point High School in Moss Point, Mississippi. Actually, Johnson wasn't interested in football until one of his friends persuaded him to go out for football as a sophomore, and after a few weeks of hitting the weights and running track, Moss Point coaches and teammates started seeing a difference in Johnson's body. By the end of his junior year, when the Tigers won the Class 5A title, he was a regular part of the Tigers’ defensive line rotation and earned a starting spot his senior year in 2000–01, when he recorded 90 tackles (25 for a loss) and eight sacks that helped Moss Point get to the playoffs, where they lost the championship game to Starkville. For his season efforts, he was named to the All-State and All-Coast teams. He was also invited to play in the MHSAA All-Star Game following his senior year.

Although Johnson posted good numbers as a senior, major schools did not come calling, so instead of settling for the Southwestern Athletic Conference (SWAC) or another smaller school, Johnson signed with Gulf Coast Community College where he played for head coach Bill Lee.

== College career ==
Johnson earned second-Team NJCAA All-America honors in 2003 at Gulf Coast Community College and was the team's Defensive Line MVP both seasons. Coming out of Perkinston, Johnson intended to sign with West Virginia, but with his mother recovering from back surgery, he decided to sign with Southern Miss instead. In 2004, Johnson officially transferred to the University of Southern Mississippi, where he played for the Golden Eagles his final 2 seasons with 12 starts. He quickly adapted to his new team and helped lead the Golden Eagles to consecutive 7–5 seasons in 2004 and 2005. In his first career game with the Golden Eagles, he helped upset the University of Nebraska on the Cornhuskers' home field in Lincoln, 21–17, in the 2004 season opener. He capped each season with consecutive victories in the New Orleans Bowl, over North Texas and Arkansas State, respectively. After a solid senior season in which he posted 54 total tackles, he was named second-team All-CUSA.

== Professional career ==
=== Indianapolis Colts ===
After going undrafted in the 2006 NFL draft, Johnson joined the Indianapolis Colts on May 1, 2006, and was signed on May 9. He was released at the end of training camp on September 2, 2006. Johnson didn't play football for the rest of 2006. On January 4, 2007, he was re-signed by the Colts and then assigned to the Cologne Centurions of the NFL Europe, where he notched 2.5 sacks during the 2007 season. Following the season, he returned to the United States to go to training camp with the Colts. He was released on August 28, 2007, in the roster cutdown.

=== Philadelphia Soul and Grand Rapids Rampage ===
In 2008, Johnson played in the Arena Football League (AFL) with the Philadelphia Soul and Grand Rapids Rampage. Listed at 6'3", 288, Johnson played in four games with the Soul and recorded 3 tackles and 2 fumble recoveries before being waived after he had been named defensive player of a game. Johnson played the last six games of the 2008 season with the Rampage and collected 2 tackles and a sack.

=== Calgary Stampeders ===
On February 19, 2009, Johnson was signed by the Calgary Stampeders of the Canadian Football League (CFL). He arrived at training camp with high expectations, but was hampered by injuries, and then missed the Stamps' season opener on July 1 in order to attend the funeral of his grandfather. In his CFL debut season, Johnson played in 6 games for Calgary, starting all of them, and was credited with 3.0 sacks and 13 tackles, helping the team advance to the West Division Final before losing to the Saskatchewan Roughriders. In his second season with the Stampeders, Johnson was part of a defensive unit that tied for first in the league in yards per carry allowed (only 5.5) and that saw him dominate the rivals' offensive linemens for 39 total tackles and four sacks, helping lead Calgary to a 13–5 record and a first-round bye into the league's division final and earning West Division All-star honors for his outstanding work as Calgary dominated the All-Star ballot with 13 selections.

=== New Orleans Saints ===
On January 20, 2011, Johnson was signed to a three-year contract with the New Orleans Saints that would end up paying him more than $1.6 million. His $75,000 signing bonus alone was more than seven years worth of NFL Europe money. Johnson finally landed in an NFL roster spot at the age of 27, five seasons after his rookie season back in 2006. Johnson stated that he picked the Saints because he fit well in the aggressive 4-3 scheme under then-defensive coordinator Gregg Williams. Showing the persistence to jumpstart an NFL career by appearing in different football leagues, Johnson became a significant contributor to the New Orleans defensive line rotation during his tenure with the team. As a member of the Saints, Johnson appeared in 40 games over three seasons and posted 55 tackles (35 solo), five sacks and a forced fumble.

==== 2011 season ====
Johnson made his debut on an NFL regular-season roster for a 2011 Saints club that went 13-3 and advanced to the NFC Divisional Playoffs. After recovering from a calf injury suffered in training camp, Johnson appeared in 13 games and recorded 15 tackles (11 solo), one sack and one forced fumble. On December 28, he was credited with his first career sack when he tackled Vikings' quarterback Christian Ponder for a six-yard loss in the win at Minnesota. In the playoffs, he played in both games for the Saints, that featured a win over the Detroit Lions in the wild-card round and a loss against the San Francisco 49ers in the divisional round.

==== 2012 season ====
In his second season with the Saints, Johnson played in 15 games as a reserve at defensive tackle and finished with 33 tackles (21 solo) and two sacks, setting then career-highs in both categories. He got his first sack of the season at the Oakland Raiders on November 18, bringing down Carson Palmer. In week 16 against the Dallas Cowboys, he brought down Tony Romo for an eight-yard loss on third down that forced the Cowboys to punt. He tallied a season-high 4 tackles in the final game of the season against the Carolina Panthers.

==== 2013 season ====
In his last season with the Saints in 2013, Johnson saw action in 12 regular season games as he was inactive weeks 3–4 with a hamstring injury and also inactive for the final two contests of the regular season. He played in both playoff contests, seeing significant action in the team's defensive line rotation. He had 15 tackles (6 solo) and tied a career-high with two sacks. On December 2, he tied a career-high with four tackles at the Seattle Seahawks. In the NFC Wild Card Playoff game at the Philadelphia Eagles, he was credited with one assisted tackle.

=== Minnesota Vikings ===
On March 19, 2014, Johnson signed a one-year contract with the Minnesota Vikings worth $845,000 that included a $100,000 signing bonus and had incentives up to an additional $600,000. He was also being looked at by Chicago, Dallas, Miami and Seattle. After a surprising career-year with the Vikings in which he recorded 6.5 sacks after entering the season with 5.0 sacks in his 40 previous career games, Johnson re-signed with the Vikings during the 2015 offseason. Johnson ranks sixth in the league among interior linemen over the past 2 seasons with 12.0 sacks, with that being the highest total by an undrafted defensive tackle in that span. He played in his fifth career playoff game when the Vikings hosted the Seattle Seahawks on January 10, 2016.

==== 2014 season ====
Johnson enjoyed a breakout season as a reserve defensive tackle in his first season as a Viking as he posted 22 total tackles, 6.5 sacks (a career-high that ranked him ranked fifth in the NFC for most sacks by a defensive tackle) and a forced fumble, playing a key role in the Vikings defensive transformation under new Head Coach Mike Zimmer, the most improved defense in the NFL in 2014. In the season-opener win at the St. Louis Rams, he entered the game as a reserve defensive tackle and was credited with a strip-sack and 2 tackles. In week 3, he started his first game as a Viking against his old New Orleans Saints teammates on September 21 and then started against the Detroit Lions three weeks later. From that game on, he had a streak of 4 straight weeks with at least 0.5 sack in a game (Detroit (10/12), at Buffalo (10/19), at Tampa Bay (10/26) and Washington (11/2). On November 30, he notched a career-high 5 tackles against the Carolina Panthers. Following the season, Pro Football Focus (PFF) ranked Johnson the Vikings' best interior pass-rusher, crediting him with 30 pressures in 301 pass-rush snaps.

==== 2015 season ====
On March 8, 2015, Johnson re-signed with the Vikings on a three-year contract. According to a league source, he agreed on a three-year deal worth a total of $7 million with a $1.5 million signing bonus and approximately $3 million in guaranteed money. The Vikings had preliminary talks with Johnson's agent, Bardia Ghahremani, about a new contract late last season, and got a new deal done before Johnson could reach the open market after the best season of his career. Johnson went on to start a career-high 8 games and played in all 16 along with the Wild Card Playoff game. He helped the Vikings claim the NFC North title for the first time since the 2009 season, winning the crown in the regular season finale at the Green Bay Packers, snapping the Packers’ 4-year streak. He recorded 5.5 sacks on the season, trailing only his career-high 6.5 set in his 2014 debut with the Vikings. He started 8 games at defensive tackle when Sharrif Floyd would shift to nose tackle in place of injured Linval Joseph. He posted his first career multi-sack game against the New York Giants on December 27 when he brought down Eli Manning twice. He broke his previous career-high 5 tackles set in 2014 with 7 tackles against the St. Louis Rams in week 9, helping hold rookie sensation Todd Gurley in check during the Vikings overtime victory.

==== 2016 season ====
After a quiet Week 1, in which Johnson wasn't credited with a single tackle, he contributed with one of the five sacks the Vikings' defensive line had on Aaron Rodgers during the team's 17–14 win over the Green Bay Packers in U.S. Bank Stadium. In Week 3, Johnson intercepted the first pass of his career when Panthers' Cam Newton threw the ball away on a desperate toss. He suffered a torn hamstring in Week 15 and was placed on injured reserve on December 20, 2016.

=== Seattle Seahawks ===
On March 23, 2018, Johnson signed with the Seattle Seahawks. He was released on September 15, 2018.

=== Minnesota Vikings (second stint) ===
On September 19, 2018, Johnson re-signed with the Minnesota Vikings.

After sitting out the 2019 season, Johnson announced his retirement on April 10, 2020.

=== NFL statistics ===
Season		Games		Tackles					Interceptions						Fumbles			
Year	Team	GP	GS	Total	Solo	Ast	Sck	Sfty	PDef	Int	Yds	Avg	Lng	TDs	FF	FR	YDS	TD
2011	New Orleans Saints	13	0	15	11	4	1.0	--	0	0	0	0.0	0	0	1	0	0	0
2012	New Orleans Saints	15	0	28	18	10	2.0	--	0	0	0	0.0	0	0	0	0	0	0
2013	New Orleans Saints	12	0	12	6	6	2.0	--	0	0	0	0.0	0	0	0	0	0	0
2014	Minnesota Vikings	16	2	22	14	8	6.5	--	0	0	0	0.0	0	0	1	0	0	0
2015	Minnesota Vikings	16	8	36	25	11	5.5	--	1	0	0	0.0	0	0	0	0	0	0
2016	Minnesota Vikings	14	0	17	11	6	2.0	--	1	1	4	4.0	4	0	0	0	0	0
2017	Minnesota Vikings	16	15	32	17	15	2.0	--	0	0	0	0.0	0	0	0	0	0	0
Career		102	25	162	102	60	21.0	--	2	1	4	4.0	4	0	2	0	0	0
