= Damarius Bilbo =

American football player and sports agent

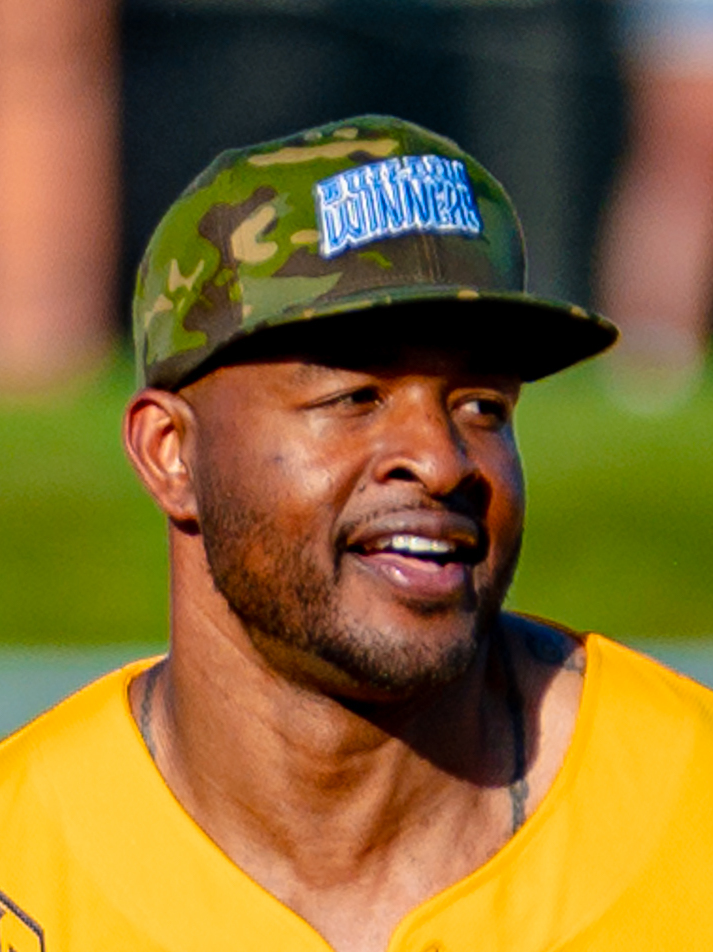
- Bilbo in 2021

No. 19, 20
- Position: Wide receiver / Quarterback / Safety

Personal information
- Born: Moss Point, Mississippi, U.S.
- Listed height: 6 ft 3 in (1.91 m)
- Listed weight: 218 lb (99 kg)

Career information
- High school: Moss Point
- College: Georgia Tech
- NFL draft: 2006: undrafted

Career history
- Arizona Cardinals (2006)*; Dallas Cowboys (2006–2007)*; Dallas Desperados (2008)*
- * Offseason or practice squad member only

Damarius Bilbo is an American sports agent and former professional football player. He played college football at Georgia Tech as a quarterback and wide receiver.

== Early life ==
Bilbo attended Moss Point High School and was a three year letterman and All-American in American football and baseball. In football, he was named the Dick Butkus Football Network National High School Player of the Year (after beating out Cedric Benson, formerly of the Cincinnati Bengals), Mississippi Player of the Year by USA Today and Gatorade. Seen by most sports writers as the best "true quarterback" in the state of Mississippi since Steve McNair and Brett Favre. In baseball, he garnered ALL-American honors and was drafted by the Milwaukee Brewers in the 2001 Major League Baseball drafted as a pitcher and center field after being clocked with a 96 mph fastball.

== College career ==
He had a medical redshirt in 2001 (broken thumb) after what looked to be a promising freshman year, and played backup quarterback in 2002. Bilbo did see extensive playing time in the second half of the Silicon Valley Football Classic (bowl) in relief of starter A.J. Suggs. He contended for the starting job during fall camp in 2003 was moved from the position by Coach Chan Gailey after what Gailey called "a great spring." Eventually 4yr starter Reggie Ball moved into the position. Bilbo was later relegated to wide receiver, leaving school that same summer to play baseball, but later returned and found success at that position, starting all 12 games his senior season opposite Calvin Johnson making them one of the top receiving duos in college football. He was invited to the Hula Bowl all-star game in Hawaii. Bilbo graduated in 2005 with a degree in management information technology and industrial design.

== Professional career ==
Bilbo was undrafted in the 2006 NFL draft, but was signed as a free-agent by the Arizona Cardinals. He was released by the Cardinals in preseason, but immediately signed by the Dallas Cowboys. He was cut from the active roster but signed to the practice squad. He helped the Cowboys prepare for their week 4 meeting with the Tennessee Titans by simulating Vince Young in practice and also Michael Vick and Donovan McNabb respectively. He was cut from the squad in mid-October in favor of ex-Seattle Seahawks Jerheme Urban after injuring the finger on his throwing hand. He was re-signed to the Cowboys in November and coach Bill Parcells called him "a very promising player" and had plans of moving him to safety because of his athletic ability and smarts.

== Post-playing career ==
After his playing career ended, Bilbo became an agent by representing Jarvis Landry, Melvin Gordon and Alvin Kamara. In 2019, Rich Paul of Klutch Sports Group hired Bilbo, expanding the company's clientele into NFL sports.
