= Ken Farragut =

American football player (1928–2014)

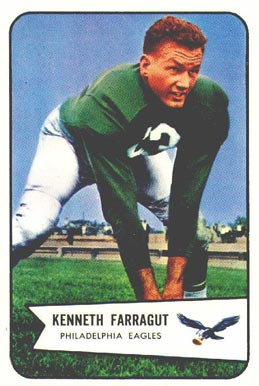
- Farragut on a 1954 Bowman football card

No. 53
- Positions: Center, linebacker

Personal information
- Born: December 23, 1928; Ponchatoula, Louisiana, U.S.
- Died: February 16, 2014 (aged 85); Lafayette Hill, Pennsylvania, U.S.
- Listed height: 6 ft 4 in (1.93 m)
- Listed weight: 240 lb (109 kg)

Career information
- High school: Moss Point (Moss Point, Mississippi)
- College: Ole Miss
- NFL draft: 1951: 6th round, 68th overall pick

Career history
- Philadelphia Eagles (1951–1954)

Awards and highlights
- Pro Bowl (1953)

Career NFL statistics
- Games played: 43
- Games started: 34
- Fumble recoveries: 2
- Stats at Pro Football Reference

Kenneth David Farragut Jr. (December 23, 1928 – February 16, 2014) was an American professional football player who was a center for the Philadelphia Eagles of the National Football League (NFL). He played college football for the Ole Miss Rebels.

== Early life ==
Born in Ponchatoula, Louisiana, Farragut moved with his family to Moss Point, Mississippi, where he became a star center and linebacker for his high school team and their coach, Tom Swayze. The team went undefeated in 1945, with Farragut as captain. As a senior in 1946, he earned all-state honors. When Swayze took an assistant coaching job at the University of Mississippi in 1947, Farragut followed him, becoming one of coach Johnny Vaught's first recruits.

== College career ==
At U of M, Farragut was the team captain in 1950. Following his senior season in 1951, he was invited to play in the College All-Star Game in Chicago.

== Professional career ==
Farragut was selected in the sixth round (68th overall) of the 1951 NFL draft by the Philadelphia Eagles, where he played center from 1951 to 1954. He was named to the Pro Bowl in 1953.

== Legacy ==
Farragut was selected to Ole Miss Hall of Fame in 1988 and the Pennsylvania Hall of Fame 1992. He was the recipient of the NFL Alumni Career Achievement Award 1992.

== Personal life and death ==
Retiring from football in 1954, Farragut remained in Philadelphia and eventually began a successful roofing company. His son David took over as CEO in 1997. Farragut died from complications of diabetes in February 2014. He was 85. He was survived by his wife Jane and their three children.
