= Kenny Johnson (defensive back) =

American football player (born 1958)

No. 37, 22
- Positions: Defensive back, return specialist

Personal information
- Born: January 7, 1958 (age 68); Moss Point, Mississippi, U.S.
- Listed height: 5 ft 10 in (1.78 m)
- Listed weight: 176 lb (80 kg)

Career information
- High school: Moss Point
- College: Mississippi State
- NFL draft: 1980: 5th round, 137th overall pick

Career history
- Atlanta Falcons (1980–1986); Houston Oilers (1986-1989)

Awards and highlights
- Second-team All-SEC (1979)

Career NFL statistics
- Fumble recoveries: 11
- Interceptions: 17
- Return yards: 2,010
- Total touchdowns: 4
- Stats at Pro Football Reference

Kenneth Ray Johnson (born January 7, 1958) is an American former professional football player who was a defensive back and return specialist for 10 seasons with the Atlanta Falcons and the Houston Oilers of the National Football League (NFL). He played college football for the Mississippi State Bulldogs and was selected by the Falcons in the fifth round of the 1980 NFL draft.

== College career ==
Kenny Johnson played as a defensive back and return specialist at Mississippi State University for four seasons from 1976-1979. He played in all 11 games each season with the Bulldogs.

== Professional career ==
Johnson was selected by the Atlanta Falcons in the fifth round (137th overall) of the 1980 NFL draft. He started every game in his first five seasons, 1980-1984, playing as a cornerback in 1980-83 and as a safety in 1984. In the 1985 season, he started in three games and played in five games.

Johnson began the 1986 season with the Falcons, but ended it with the Houston Oilers. Johnson played mainly as a return specialist for the Oilers from 1986-1989, while starting three games.
