= Melvin Booker =

American basketball player (born 1972)

Personal information
- Born: August 20, 1972 (age 54) Pascagoula, Mississippi, U.S.
- Listed height: 188 cm (6 ft 2 in)
- Listed weight: 84 kg (185 lb)

Career information
- High school: Moss Point (Moss Point, Mississippi)
- College: Missouri (1990–1994)
- NBA draft: 1994: undrafted
- Playing career: 1994–2008
- Position: Point guard
- Number: 9, 14, 5

Career history
- 1994–1995: Hartford Hellcats
- 1995: Pittsburgh Piranhas
- 1995–1996: Grand Rapids Mackers
- 1996: Houston Rockets
- 1996: Denver Nuggets
- 1996–1997: Grand Rapids Hoops
- 1997: Golden State Warriors
- 1998–1999: Sony Milano
- 1999–2002: Scavolini Pesaro
- 2002–2004: Ülkerspor
- 2006–2007: Khimki
- 2007–2008: Olimpia Milano

Career highlights
- Consensus second-team All-American (1994); Big Eight Player of the Year (1994); 2× First-team All-Big Eight (1993, 1994)

Career NBA statistics
- Points: 166 (5.2 ppg)
- Rebounds: 38 (1.2 rpg)
- Assists: 74 (2.3 apg)
- Stats at NBA.com
- Stats at Basketball Reference

Melvin Jermaine Booker (born August 20, 1972) is an American former professional basketball player. A 6 ft 2 in (1.88 m), 185 lb (84 kg) point guard, he played college basketball for the Missouri Tigers. He played professionally in the National Basketball Association (NBA) and other leagues.

== Amateur career ==
Booker was a standout high school player in Moss Point, Mississippi. He averaged 28 points per game in his senior year and was named the player of the year in his division. Despite that, none of the major four-year schools from the region recruited him. Booker signed with Missouri, a school whose attention he caught during a prior recruitment run through the area. Missouri assistant coaches noticed him while they were scouting fellow Mississippi standouts Litterial Green and Chris Jackson.

Booker was the 1994 Big Eight Player of the Year, when he led Missouri to an undefeated conference record of 14–0 and an Elite Eight berth. He was also an all Big Eight selection in 1993 and 1994 and was a 1994 first-team All-American as a senior, when he averaged 18.1 points and 4.5 assists per game. In 1999, Booker was elected to the intercollegiate athletics Hall of Fame at the University of Missouri.

== Professional Career ==
Despite his accomplishments, Booker was not selected in the 1994 NBA draft.

He played in the NBA for the Houston Rockets during the 1995–96 season; and the Denver Nuggets and Golden State Warriors, during the 1996–97 season, for 32 games.

== Personal life ==
While playing for the Grand Rapids Mackers in the 1995–1996 CBA season, Booker met Veronica Gutiérrez. The two became close and had a son, Devin, who was born on October 30, 1996. The two never married and Gutiérrez would take care of their son Devin while his father played pro basketball in Europe and Asia. During the summers, Booker would bring his son to his games which helped to drive Devin's interest in basketball. After Melvin Booker retired from pro basketball in 2008, he returned to his hometown of Moss Point, Mississippi and brought his son with him so he could help train him to become a successful basketball player. Booker was hired as an assistant coach for basketball at his alma mater, Moss Point High School, in 2011.

His only child, Devin Booker, played for the University of Kentucky Wildcats basketball team during their nearly undefeated 2014–15 NCAA season, was then drafted by and plays for the Phoenix Suns, playing in the 2021 NBA Finals.
