= Moss Point School District =

School district in Mississippi

The Moss Point School District is a public school district based in Moss Point, Mississippi, United States. The district serves the communities of Moss Point, most of Escatawpa and all of Helena.

In early 2015, the district added sexual orientation, gender identity and gender expression to its protected civil rights and equal education opportunity policy and paid an undisclosed sum to settle a lawsuit by a student who was allegedly bullied by teachers and staff for her sexual orientation.

In 2026, Moss Point School District had a high school graduation rate of 96.2 percent, the highest among the Mississippi Gulf Coast.

== Schools ==
=== High School (Grades 9-12) ===
- Moss Point High School
  - The Moss Point Alternative School and Career and Technical Education Center are also located on the high school campus.

=== Middle School (Grades 6-8) ===
- Magnolia Middle School

=== Elementary Schools (Grades K-5) ===
- Escatawpa Upper Elementary School(Grades 3–5)
- Kreole Primary School(Grades K-2)

=== Other District Campuses ===
- Family Education Center

== History ==
=== Integration ===
Prior to integration, Moss Point High School served the white students of the city, and Magnolia High School served the black students. When the schools were integrated in 1970, all high school students attended Moss Point High School; the former all black Magnolia High School and all white Ed Mayo Elementary School were repurposed as junior high schools. The Moss Point High School building, whose main building was built in 1942, still serves the community today.

=== Declining Enrollment and School Reconfigurations ===
Magnolia Junior High School and Ed Mayo Junior High School served as the district's two junior high schools until 2003. That year, Ed Mayo Junior High and Magnolia Junior High merged into one school housed at the Magnolia campus. In 2005, Hurricane Katrina severely damaged the Magnolia building; junior high classes were temporarily moved to the former Ed Mayo building. Years later, the school district received FEMA funding to demolish and rebuild this historic school. Opening in 2013 on the site of the old school, the new Magnolia Middle School serves grades 6-8 and was built with materials salvaged from the old building. The new school has a room dedicated to the history of the old Magnolia school.

In 2009, the school district continued to face declining enrollment numbers. The district chose to consolidate and reconfigure its elementary schools, which previously operated as neighborhood schools, to grade level centers. Charlotte Hyatt Elementary School and Ed Mayo Elementary School, two of the district's smaller schools, would be permanently closed. After additional consolidations and closures between 2009 and 2012, only two of those four elementary schools would remain in operation. Kreole Primary Elementary School serves students in grades PreK-2, and Escatawpa Upper Elementary School serves students in grades 3–5.

== Demographics ==
=== 2022-23 school year ===
There were a total of 1,569 students enrolled in the Moss Point School District during the 2022–23 school year. The gender makeup of the district was 47% female and 53% male. The racial makeup of the district was 73% African American, 15% White, less than 5% Hispanic, less than 5% Asian, and less than 5% Native American.

=== Previous school years ===
School Year	Enrollment	Gender Makeup		Racial Makeup				
School Year	Enrollment	Female	Male	Asian	African American	Hispanic	Native American	White
2021-22	1,579	49%	51%	<5%	73%	6%	<5%	16%
2020-21	1,513	50%	50%	<5%	74%	6%	<5%	16%
2019-20	1,684	48%	52%	<5%	74%	5%	<5%	18%
2018-19	1,810	49%	51%	<5%	74%	5%	<5%	19%
2017-18	1,915	49%	51%	<5%	74%	4%	<5%	20%
2016-17	1,933	49%	51%	<5%	74%	3%	<5%	20%

== Mississippi Succeeds Report Card ==
	2018-19	2019-20	2020-21	2021-22	2022-23
District Accountability Grade	D	D	D	C	B
School Accountability Grade					
Moss Point High School	B	B	B	B	A
Magnolia Middle School	D	D	D	D	D
Escatawpa Upper Elementary	F	F	F	D	D
Kreole Primary School	F	F	F	D	C

== Notable alumni ==
- Brad Arnold, 3 Doors Down lead singer
- Damarius Bilbo, NFL player and sports agent
- Devin Booker, NBA player
- Melvin Booker, NBA player
- Kenny Johnson, NFL player
- Tony Sipp, MLB player

== Athletics ==
=== Football ===
State Playoff Champions: 1983, 1991, 1996, 1997, 2000

District Championships: 1983, 1985, 1986, 1989, 1991, 1992, 1994, 1995, 1996, 1997, 2000, 2001, 2002, 2007, 2009, 2019, 2020, 2021

== See also ==
- List of school districts in Mississippi
