= Moss Point, Mississippi =

- City
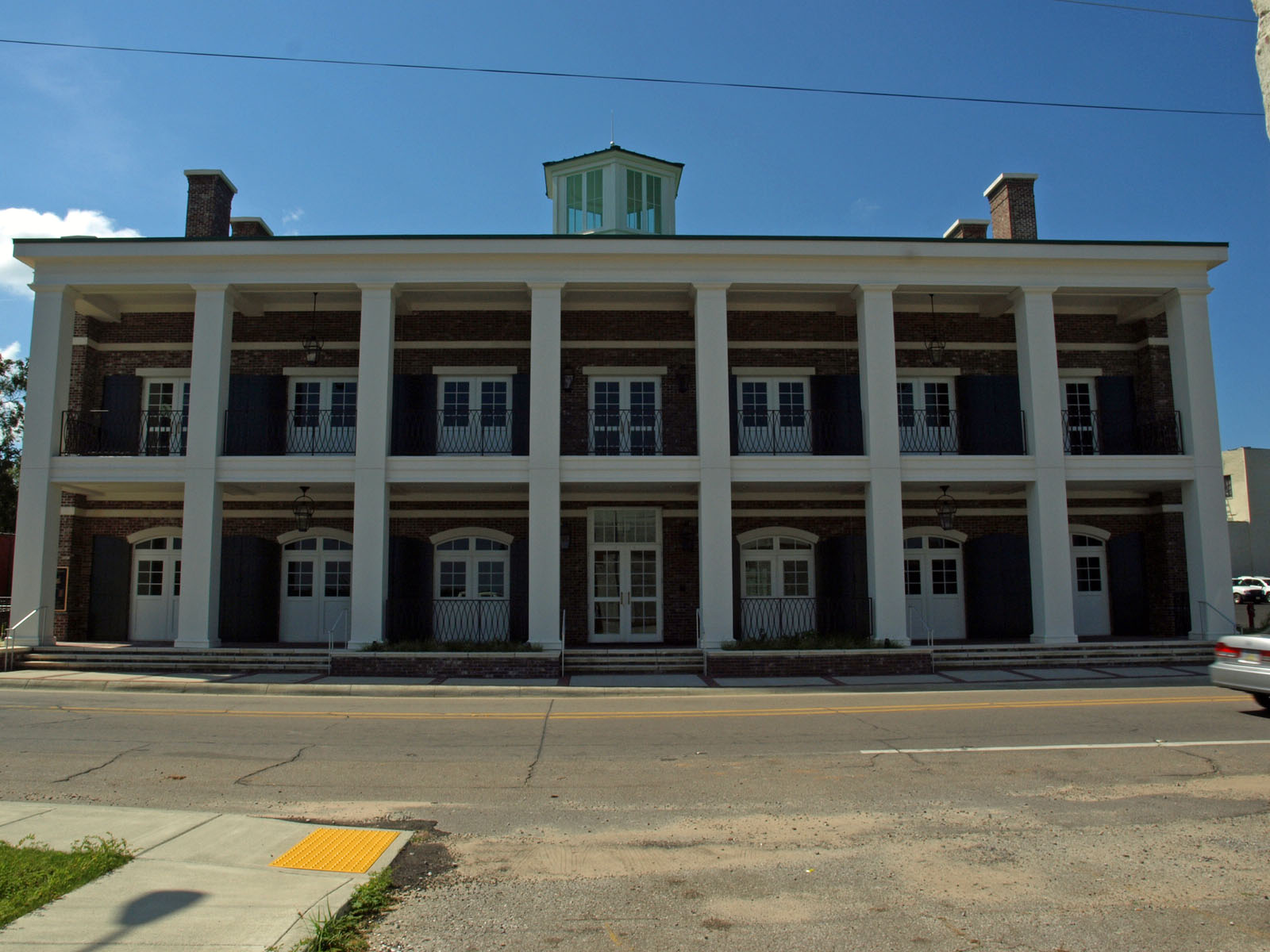
- Moss Point City Hall

- Flag Seal Logo

- Location of Moss Point in the state of Mississippi

- Location in the United States
- Coordinates: 30°24′42″N 88°32′04″W
- Country: United States
- State: Mississippi
- County: Jackson
- Incorporated: 1901 (as a city)

Government
  - Mayor: Billy Knight, Sr. (D)

Area
  - Total: 26.56 sq mi (68.80 km^{2})
  - Land: 24.11 sq mi (62.45 km^{2})
  - Water: 2.45 sq mi (6.35 km^{2})
- Elevation: 16 ft (5 m)

Population (2020)
  - Total: 12,147
  - Density: 504/sq mi (194.5/km^{2})
- Time zone: UTC-6 (CST)
  - Summer (DST): UTC-5 (CDT)
- ZIP codes: 39562, 39563, 39581
- Area code: 228
- FIPS code: 28-49240
- GNIS feature ID: 0673878
- Website: cityofmosspoint.org

Moss Point is a city in Jackson County, Mississippi, United States. The population was 12,147 in 2020, a decline from the figure of 13,704 in 2010. The Moss Point Historic District and several individual buildings are listed on the National Register of Historic Places' Jackson County listings.

== History ==
Moss Point is home to Trent Lott International Airport and the Mississippi Export Railroad.

On August 29, 2005, Moss Point was hit by the strong eastern side of Hurricane Katrina, when it passed 30 miles (48 km) east of central New Orleans with minimal gale-force winds. However, on the east side of Hurricane Katrina, much of Moss Point was flooded or destroyed in one day, by the strong hurricane-force winds which lasted several hours and a storm surge exceeding 20 feet (6.1 m) in some sections.

An EF2 tornado touched down in Moss Point on June 19, 2023 The tornado covered six miles of the city and damaged or destroyed over 300 homes and businesses.

== Geography ==
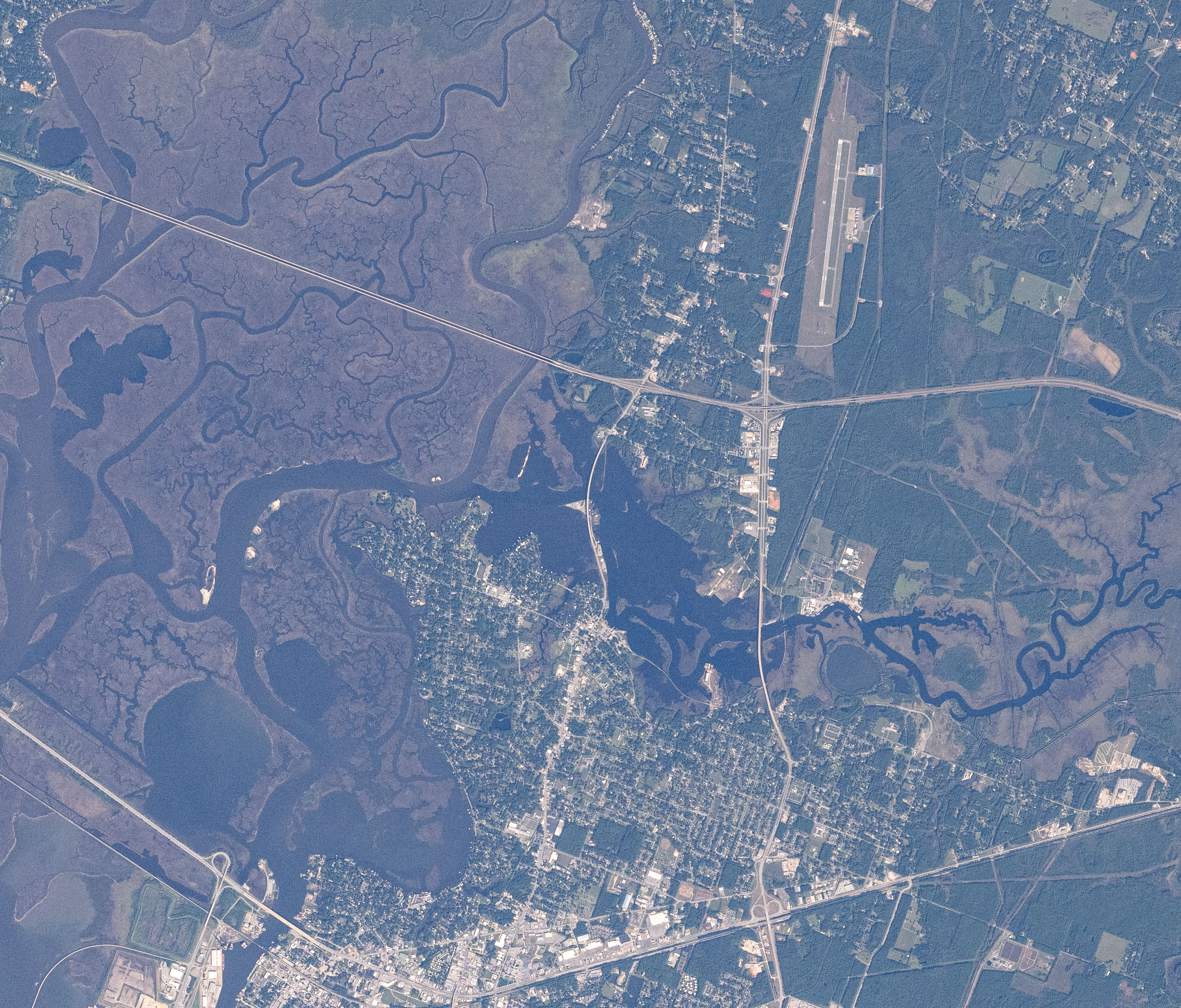
View from ISS Expedition 72, November 2024

Moss Point is in southeastern Jackson County, on the east side of the Pascagoula River. It is bordered to the south by the city of Pascagoula, the county seat, and to the north by unincorporated Escatawpa. The Escatawpa River flows east–west through the city into the Pascagoula River.

U.S. Route 90 forms the southeastern boundary of Moss Point, leading southwestward into Pascagoula and northeastward to Interstate 10, which runs through the northern part of the Moss Point city limits. I-10 leads west 22 miles (35 km) to the Biloxi area and northeast 36 miles (58 km) to Mobile, Alabama. Mississippi Highways 63 and 613 (Main Street) are north–south roads through Moss Point. Highway 63 leads south to US-90 and north 38 miles (61 km) to Lucedale, while Highway 613 leads south 4 miles (6 km) to the center of Pascagoula and north 5 miles (8 km) to Escatawpa.

Moss Point has a total area of 26.6 square miles (68.8 km^{2}), of which 24.2 square miles (62.6 km^{2}) are land and 2.4 square miles (6.3 km^{2}), or 9.11%, are water.

== Demographics ==
Historical population
Census	Pop.	Note	%±
1870	440		—
1880	1,333		203.0%
1910	3,054		—
1920	3,340		9.4%
1930	2,453		−26.6%
1940	3,042		24.0%
1950	3,782		24.3%
1960	6,631		75.3%
1970	19,321		191.4%
1980	18,998		−1.7%
1990	17,837		−6.1%
2000	17,653		−1.0%
2010	13,704		−22.4%
2020	12,147		−11.4%
U.S. Decennial Census

=== Racial and ethnic composition ===
Moss Point city, Mississippi – Racial and ethnic composition Note: the US Census treats Hispanic/Latino as an ethnic category. This table excludes Latinos from the racial categories and assigns them to a separate category. Hispanics/Latinos may be of any race.
Race / Ethnicity (NH = Non-Hispanic)	Pop 2000	Pop 2010	Pop 2020	% 2000	% 2010	% 2020
White alone (NH)	4,402	3,172	2,617	27.77%	23.15%	21.54%
Black or African American alone (NH)	11,136	10,048	8,655	70.25%	73.32%	71.25%
Native American or Alaska Native alone (NH)	22	28	23	0.14%	0.20%	0.19%
Asian alone (NH)	33	60	40	0.21%	0.44%	0.33%
Native Hawaiian or Pacific Islander alone (NH)	4	4	1	0.03%	0.03%	0.01%
Other race alone (NH)	13	16	24	0.08%	0.12%	0.20%
Mixed race or Multiracial (NH)	82	122	337	0.52%	0.89%	2.77%
Hispanic or Latino (any race)	159	254	450	1.00%	1.85%	3.70%
Total	15,851	13,704	12,147	100.00%	100.00%	100.00%

=== 2020 census ===
As of the 2020 census, Moss Point had a population of 12,147. The median age was 47.2 years. 18.0% of residents were under the age of 18 and 23.7% were 65 years of age or older. For every 100 females, there were 90.9 males, and for every 100 females age 18 and over, there were 89.6 males age 18 and over.

96.4% of residents lived in urban areas, while 3.6% lived in rural areas.

There were 5,102 households and 3,263 families in Moss Point, and 23.8% of households had children under the age of 18 living in them. Of all households, 30.4% were married-couple households, 23.2% were households with a male householder and no spouse or partner present, and 40.6% were households with a female householder and no spouse or partner present. About 31.9% of all households were made up of individuals and 14.5% had someone living alone who was 65 years of age or older.

There were 6,011 housing units, of which 15.1% were vacant. The homeowner vacancy rate was 2.0% and the rental vacancy rate was 13.9%.

== Education ==
The city is served by the Moss Point School District.

== Notable people ==
- Verlon Biggs, NFL football player, Defensive end for the New York Jets from 1965 to 1970 and the Washington Redskins from 1971 to 1974
- Damarius Bilbo, NFL football player and sports agent, graduated Moss Point High School in 2001
- Devin Booker, NBA basketball player
- Melvin Booker, graduated Moss Point High School in 1990, NBA basketball player, father of Devin Booker
- John Brock, CEO of Coca-Cola Enterprises (graduated Moss Point High School in 1967)
- Ray Costict, linebacker for the New England Patriots from 1977 to 1979
- Ken Farragut, NFL and Ole Miss Hall of Fame football player
- Silky Nutmeg Ganache, contestant on season 11 of RuPaul's Drag Race
- Eddie Glaude, Professor of Religion and African American Studies at Princeton University
- Don Hultz, NFL football player
- Alcender Jackson, NFL football player
- Kenny Johnson, former cornerback for the Atlanta Falcons and Houston Oilers.
- Tom Johnson, NFL defensive tackle for the Minnesota Vikings
- Robert C. Khayat, NFL football player, lawyer, Chancellor of the University of Mississippi
- David Thomas Roberts, composer and musician
- Toni Seawright, 1982 graduate of Moss Point High; the first African American to win Miss Mississippi in 1987 (4th Runner-up Miss America 1988)
- Tony Sipp, Major League Baseball Houston Astros - twice World Series Champion
- Cory Wilson, United States Court of Appeals for the Fifth Circuit judge
- George Wonsley, NFL football player
- Nathan Wonsley, NFL football player

== Sister cities ==
In the wake of Hurricane Katrina, Burlington, Vermont became the sister city of Moss Point and provided much-needed aid to the city.

== See also ==
- L.N. Dantzler Lumber Company
