= 2014 McDonald's All-American Boys Game =

American high school basketball game

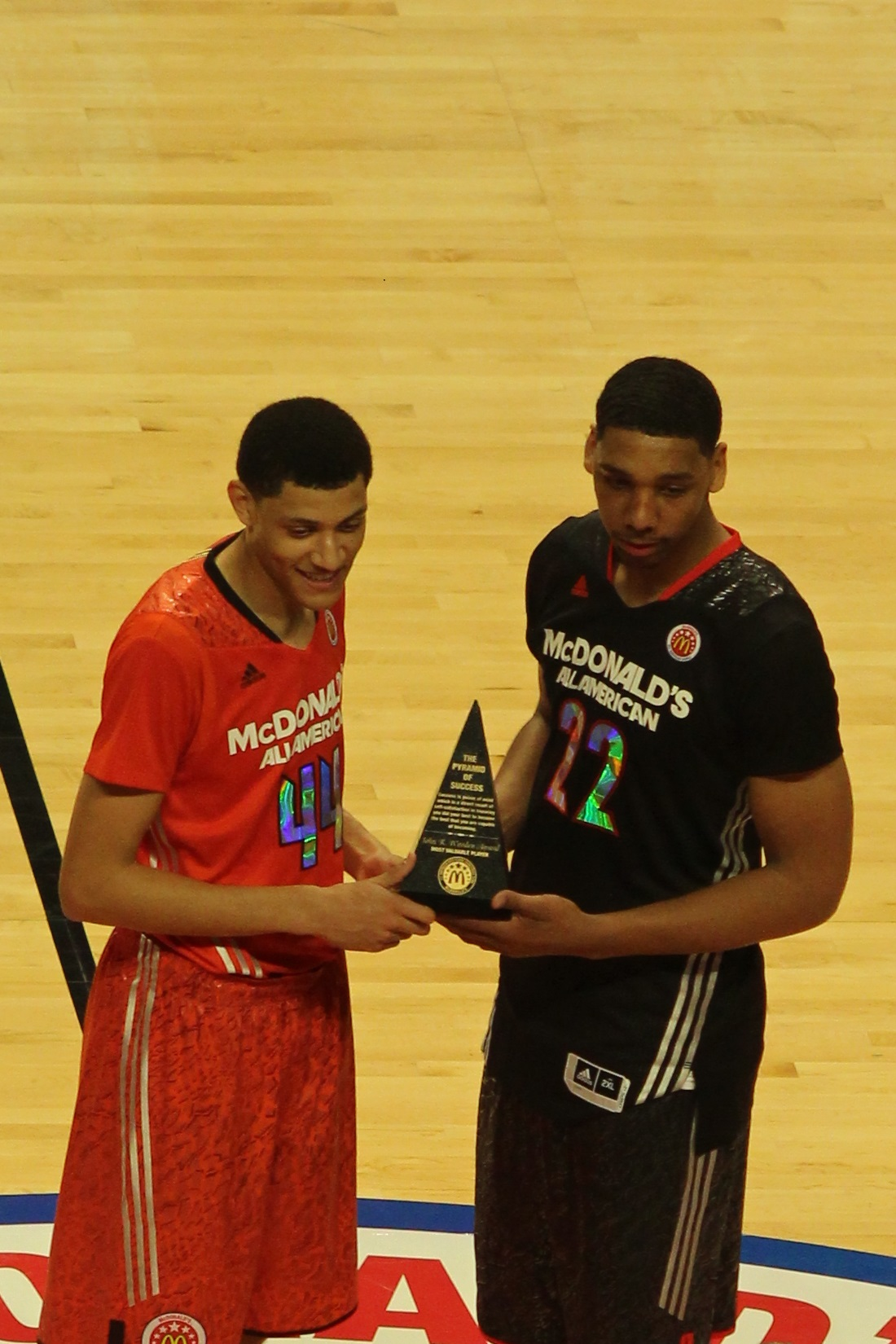
- Jahlil Okafor (black uniform, right) and Justin Jackson (red uniform, left) being honored as co-MVPs
East	West
102	105
	1st half	2nd half	Total
East	51	51	102
West	50	55	105
- Date: April 2, 2014 9:30 PM ET
- Venue: United Center, Chicago, Illinois
- MVP: Jahlil Okafor, Justin Jackson
- Referees: Kenneth Moreland, Bryce Cann, Mark Maslona
- Attendance: 17,116
- Halftime show: DJ R-Tistic
- Network: ESPN
- Announcers: Carter Blackburn, Jalen Rose, Jay Williams, & Quint Kessenich

McDonald's All-American

The 2014 McDonald's All-American Boys Game was an All-star basketball game that was played on April 2, 2014 at the United Center in Chicago, home of the Chicago Bulls. It was the 37th annual McDonald's All-American Game for high school boys. The game's rosters featured the best and most highly recruited blue chip boys high school basketball players graduating in 2014. Chicago, which became the first city to host the game in back-to-back years in 2012, continued to host the game annually until 2017. The rosters for the game were announced at 6:00 PM ET on January 29 on ESPNU. At the time of the announcement, 22 of the 24 players had committed to Division I basketball programs. Duke and Kentucky led the field with four commits each. One of the game's major storylines was that local big men Jahlil Okafor (McDonald's Morgan Wootten Player of the Year) and Cliff Alexander (Naismith Player of the Year) opposed each other.

== Rosters ==
The 2014–15 Duke Blue Devils (Tyus Jones, Justise Winslow, Okafor, and Grayson Allen) and 2014–15 Kentucky Wildcats (Karl-Anthony Towns, Trey Lyles, Tyler Ulis, and Devin Booker) shared the lead among committed players at the time of the original roster announcement on January 29. Three hometown players (Okafor, Alexander and Tyler Ulis) were selected for the game. Texas led the way with five natives (Myles Turner, Emmanuel Mudiay, Justin Jackson, Justise Winslow, and Kelly Oubre Jr.). Rashad Vaughn committed to UNLV on February 11, but Turner remained uncommitted at the time of the game. He committed to Texas 4 weeks after the game on April 30.

8 days before the game, Okafor was recognized as the Morgan Wootten Player of the Year. 2 days before the game, Grayson Allen won the slam dunk contest, James Blackmon, Jr. won the three-point contest and Tyus Jones won the skills competition.

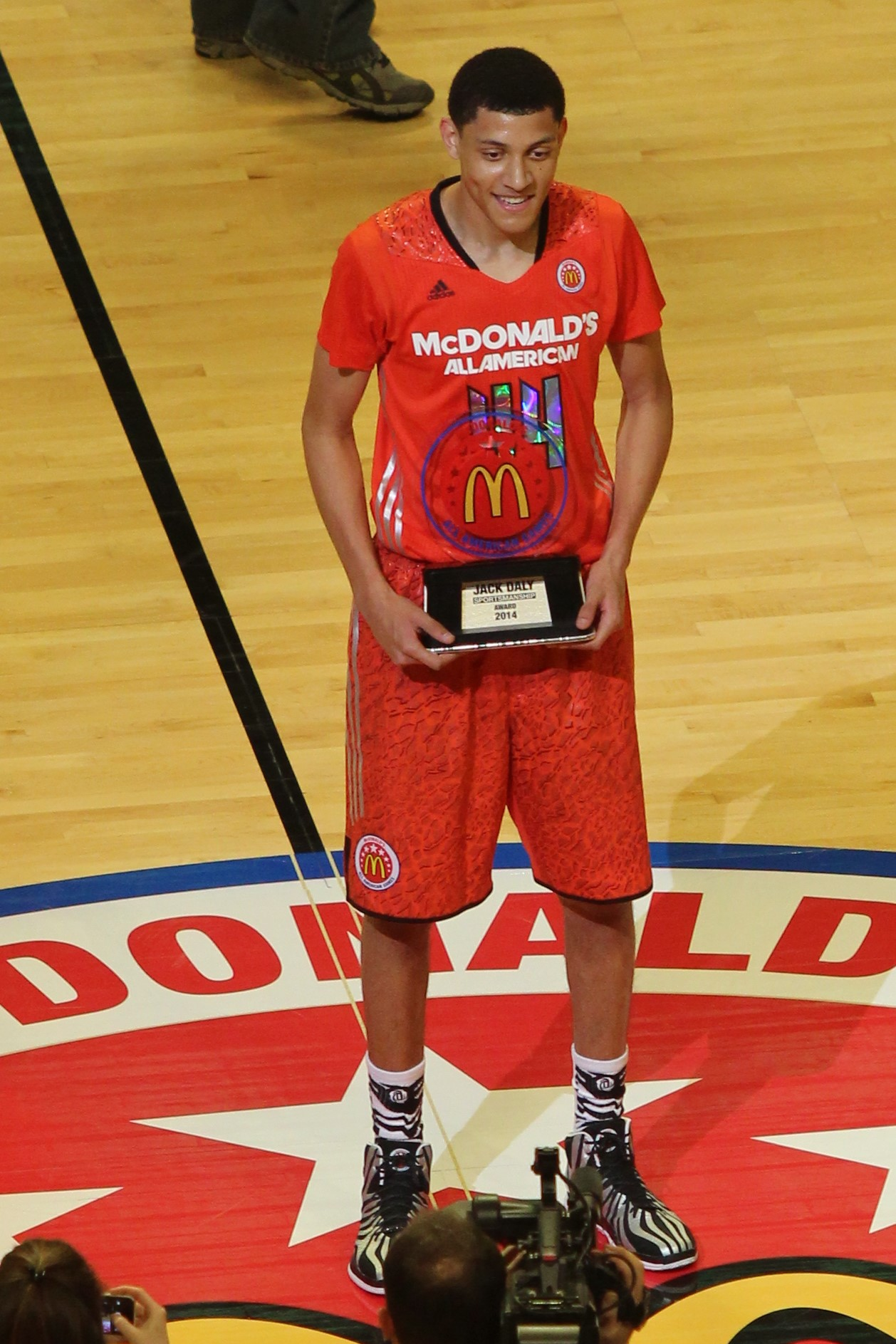
Justin Jackson won the Jack Daly Award for sportsmanship

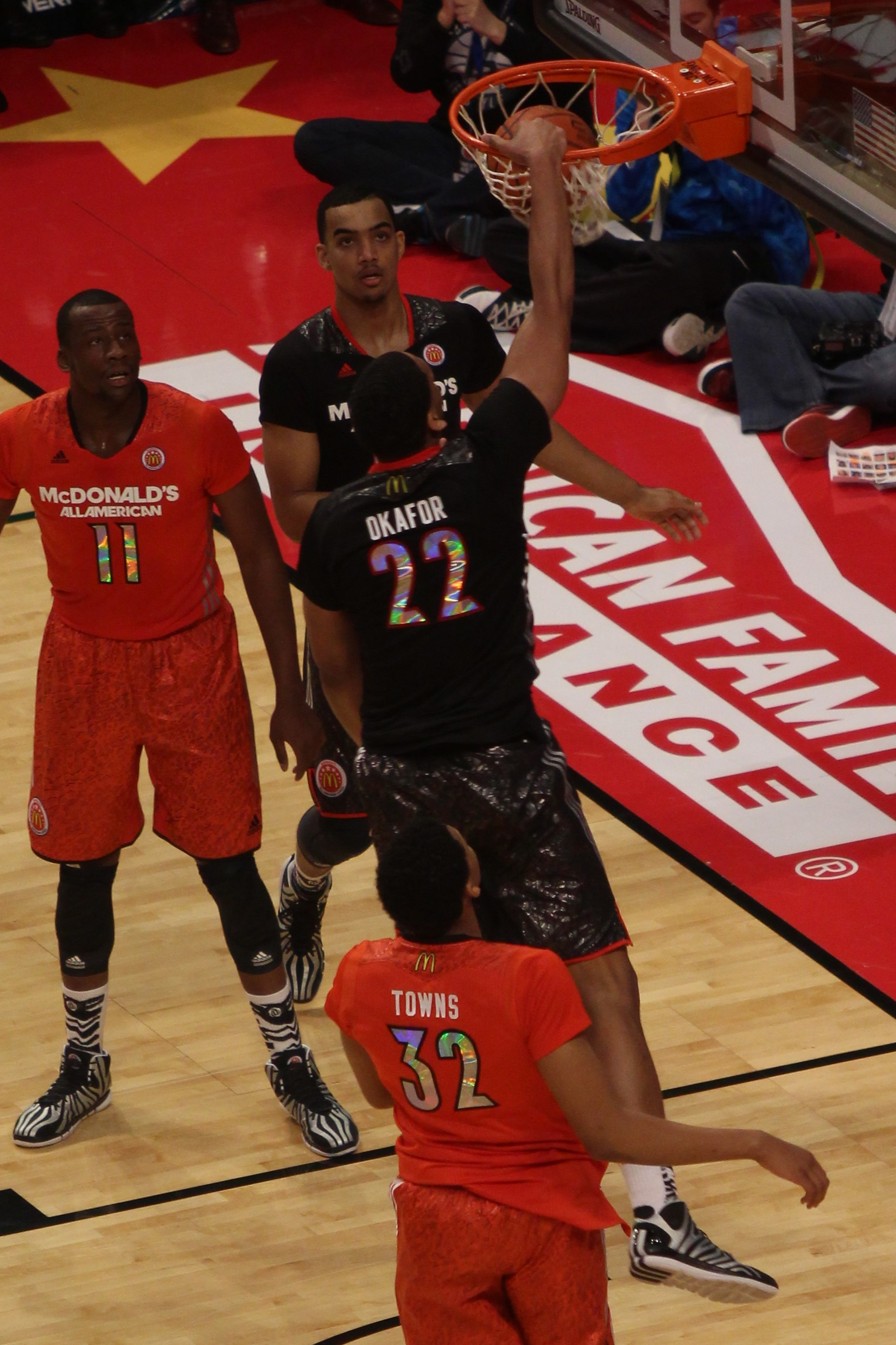
Jahlil Okafor made this dunk to give the west a 103–102 lead with less than 40 seconds left in this 105–102 victory.

=== East Roster ===
#	Name	Height	Weight	Position	Hometown	High school	College choice
11	Cliff Alexander	6–9	245	PF	Chicago, Illinois	Curie Metropolitan High School	Kansas
35	Myles Turner	6–11	250	C	Bedford, Texas	Trinity High School (Euless, Texas)	Texas
21	Tyus Jones	6–1	195	PG	Burnsville, Minnesota	Apple Valley High School (Minnesota)	Duke
32	Karl-Anthony Towns	7–0	250	PF	Metuchen, New Jersey	St. Joseph High School (Metuchen, New Jersey)	Kentucky
24	James Blackmon, Jr.	6–4	200	SG	Chicago, Illinois	Marion High School (Indiana)	Indiana
3	D'Angelo Russell	6–4	193	SG	Louisville, Kentucky	Montverde Academy	Ohio State
44	Justin Jackson	6–8	220	SF	Spring, Texas	Homeschool	North Carolina
2	Melo Trimble	6–3	195	PG	Upper Marlboro, Maryland	Bishop O'Connell High School	Maryland
15	Isaiah Whitehead	6–4	213	SG	Brooklyn, New York	Abraham Lincoln High School (Brooklyn)	Seton Hall
1	Theo Pinson	6–5	212	SF	Greensboro, North Carolina	Wesleyan Christian Academy	North Carolina
20	Justise Winslow	6–6	222	SF	Houston, Texas	St. John's School (Texas)	Duke
5	Kevon Looney	6–9	250	PF	Milwaukee, Wisconsin	Alexander Hamilton High School (Milwaukee)	UCLA

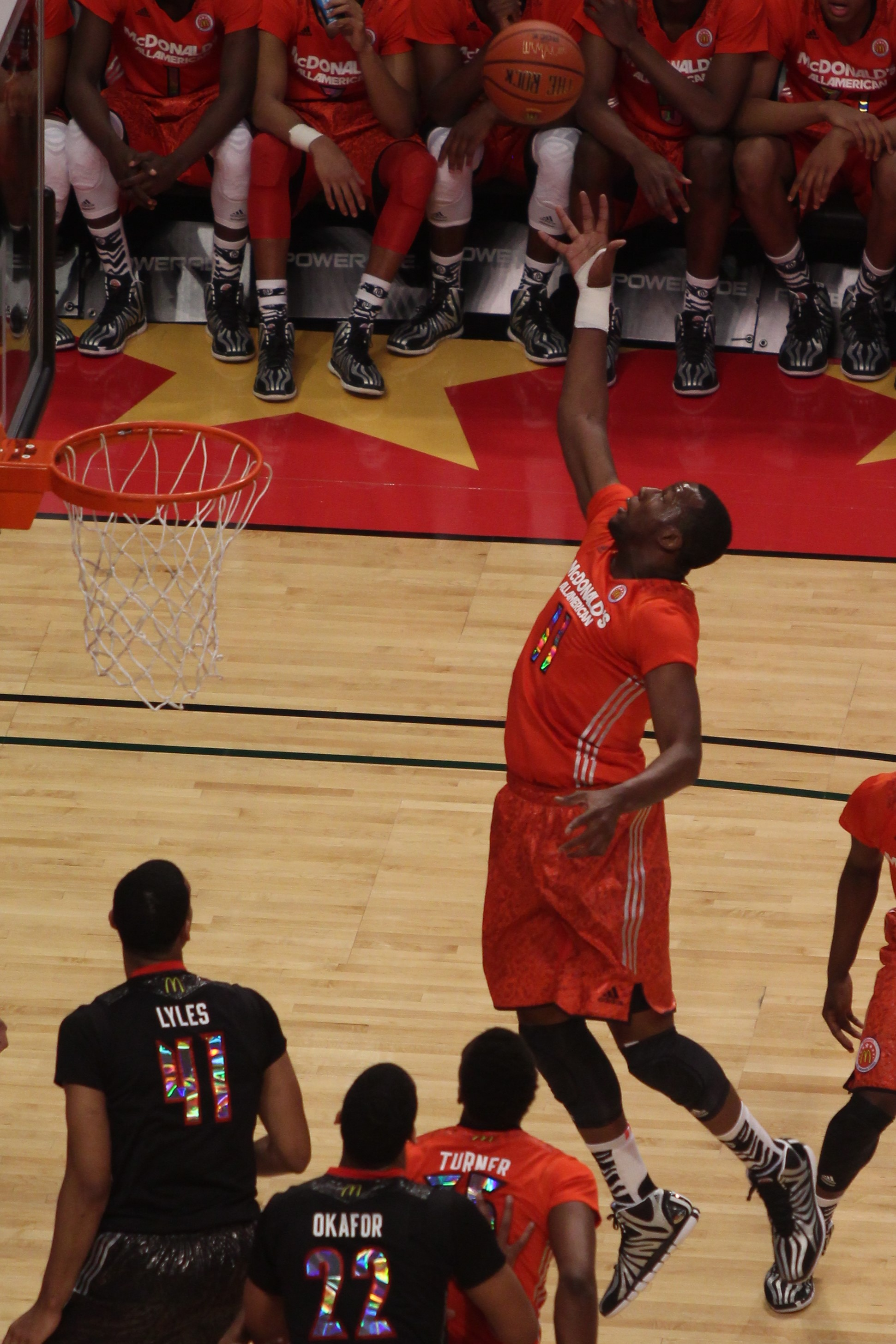
Cliff Alexander

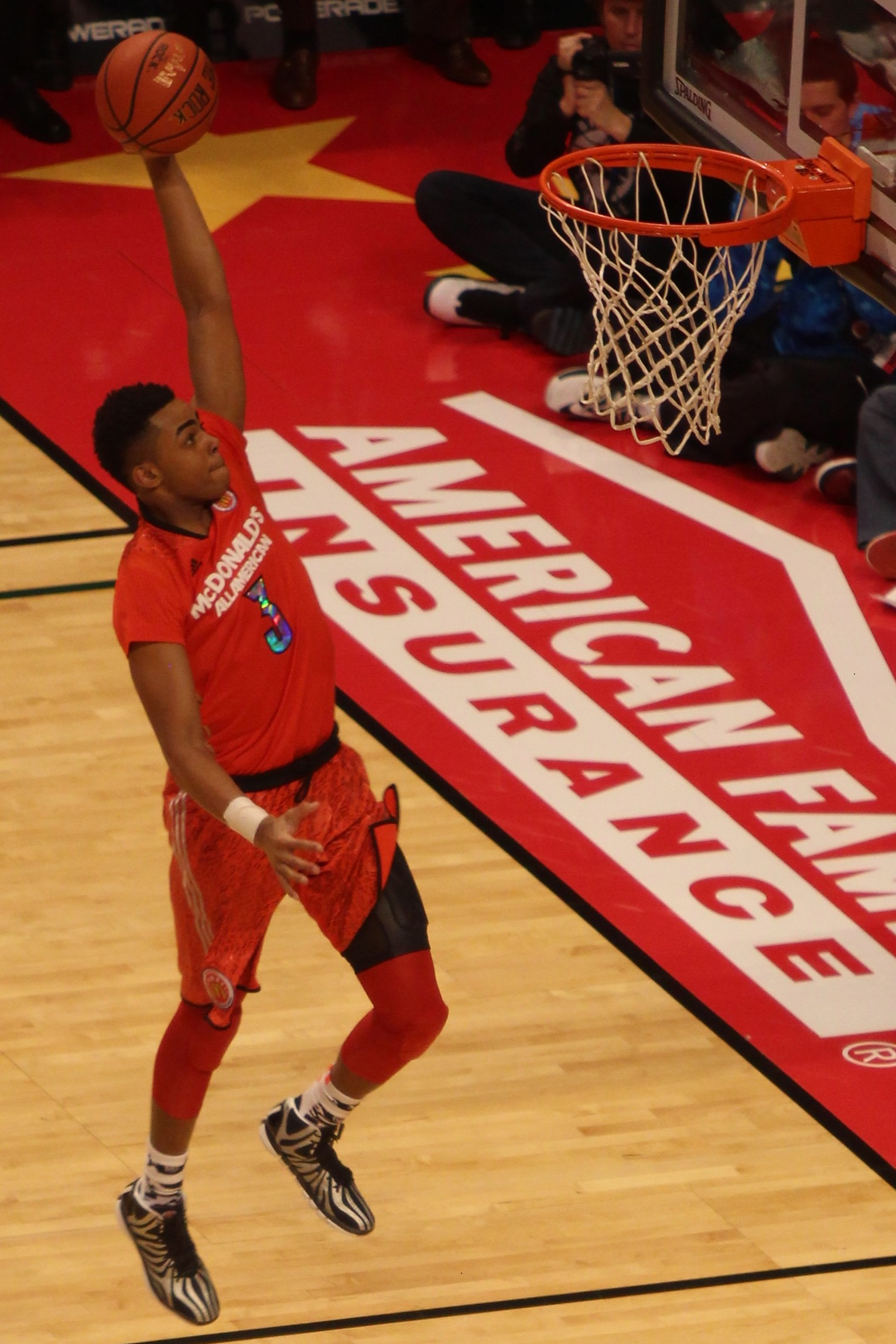
D'Angelo Russell

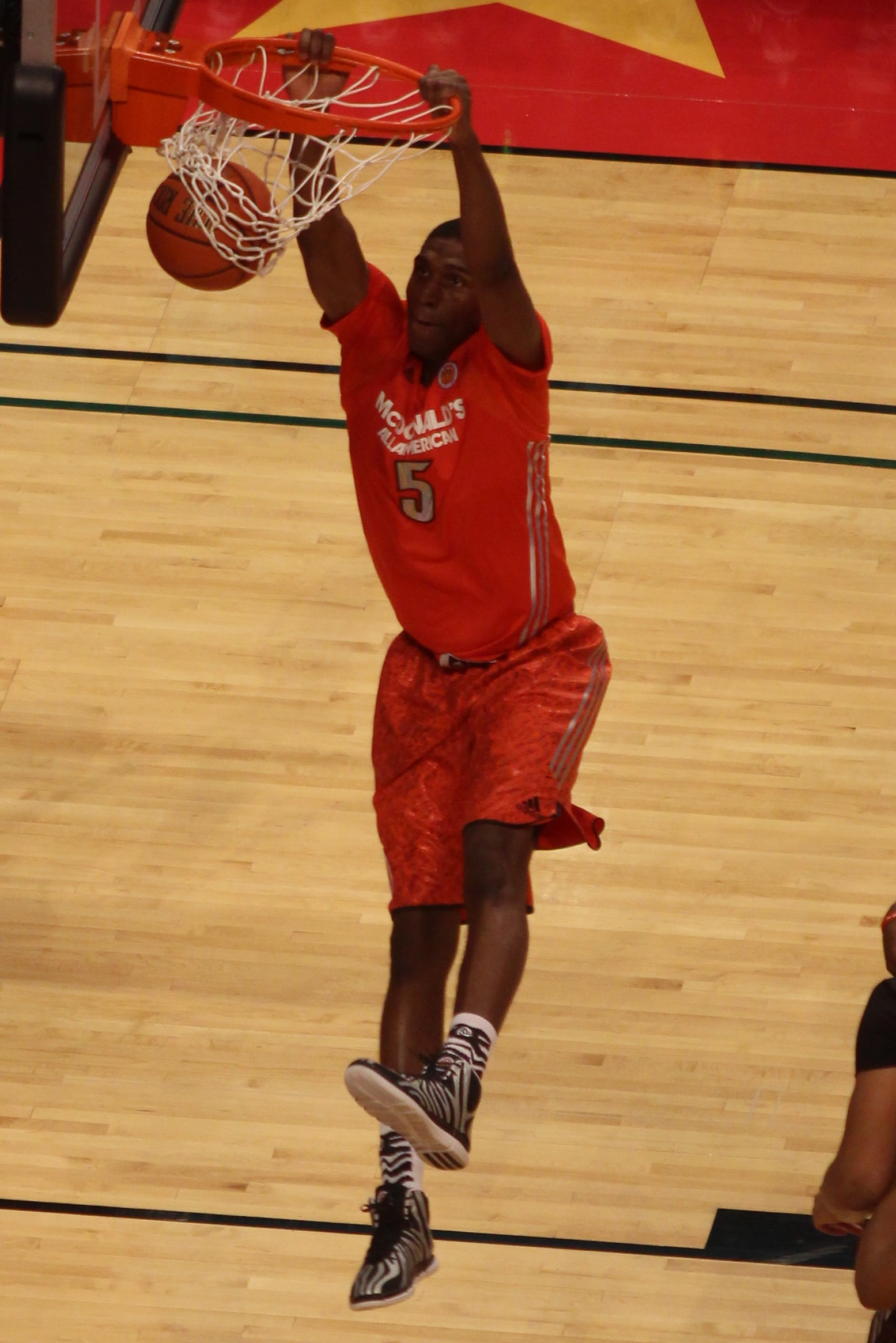
Kevon Looney

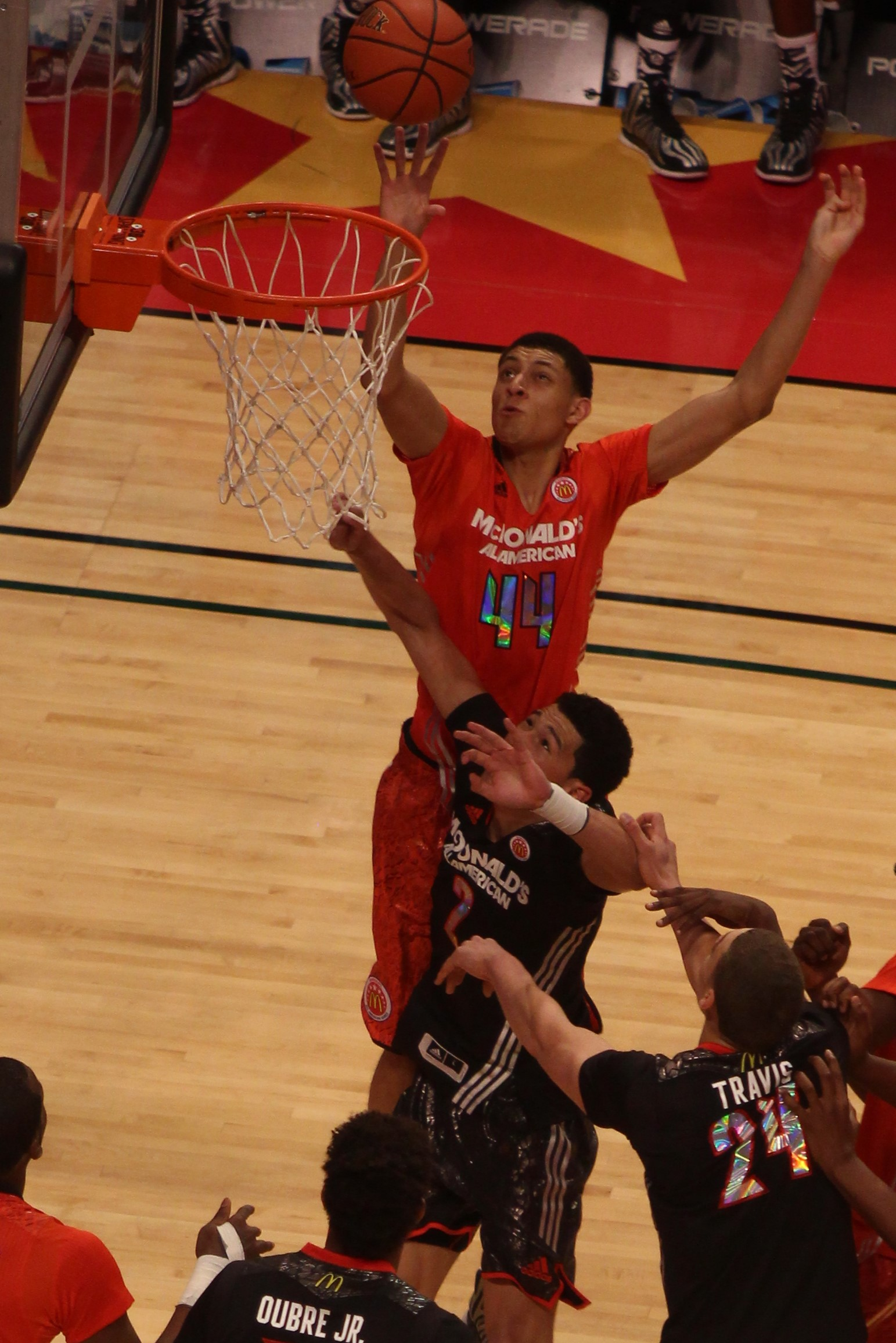
Justin Jackson

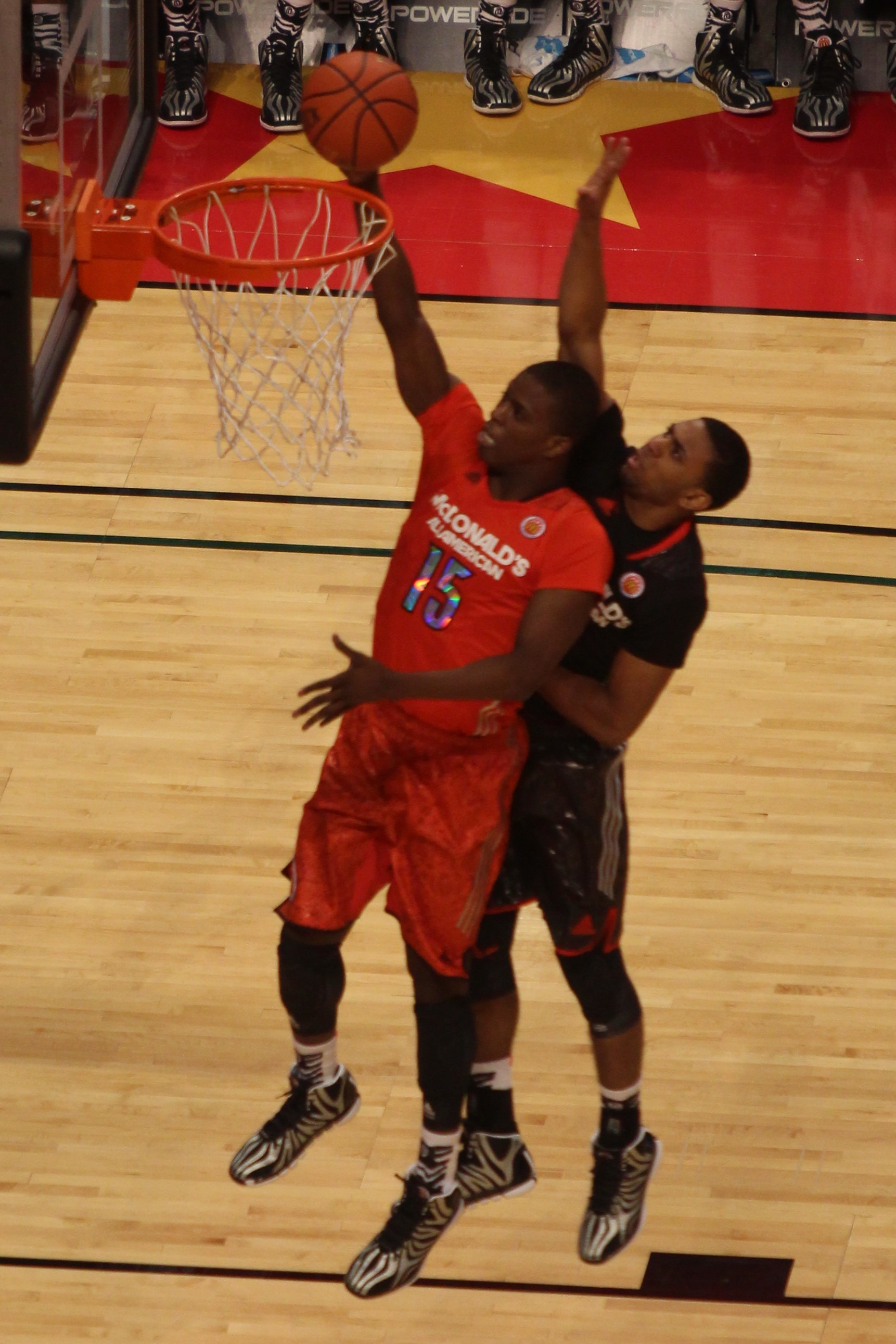
Isaiah Whitehead

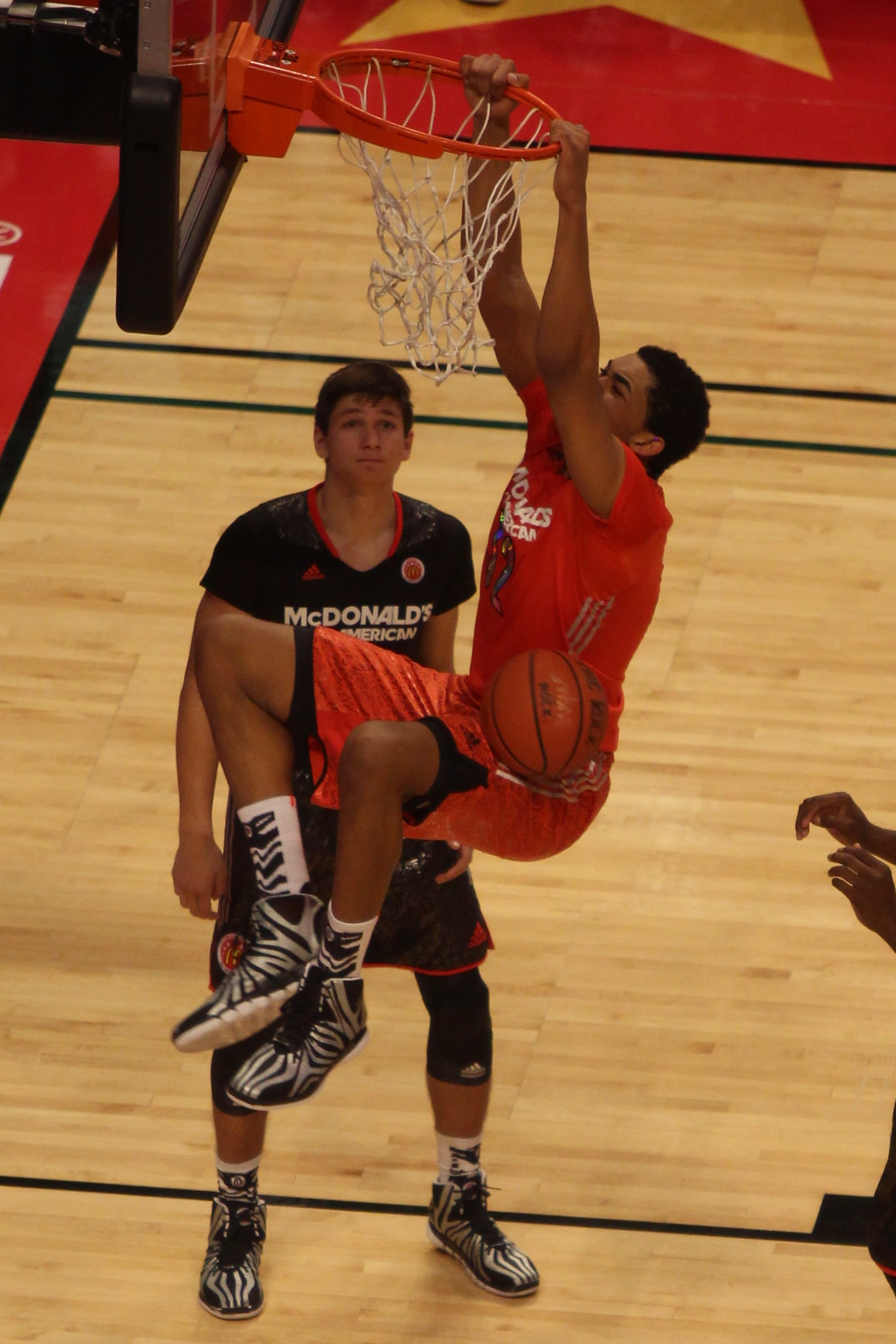
Karl-Anthony Towns

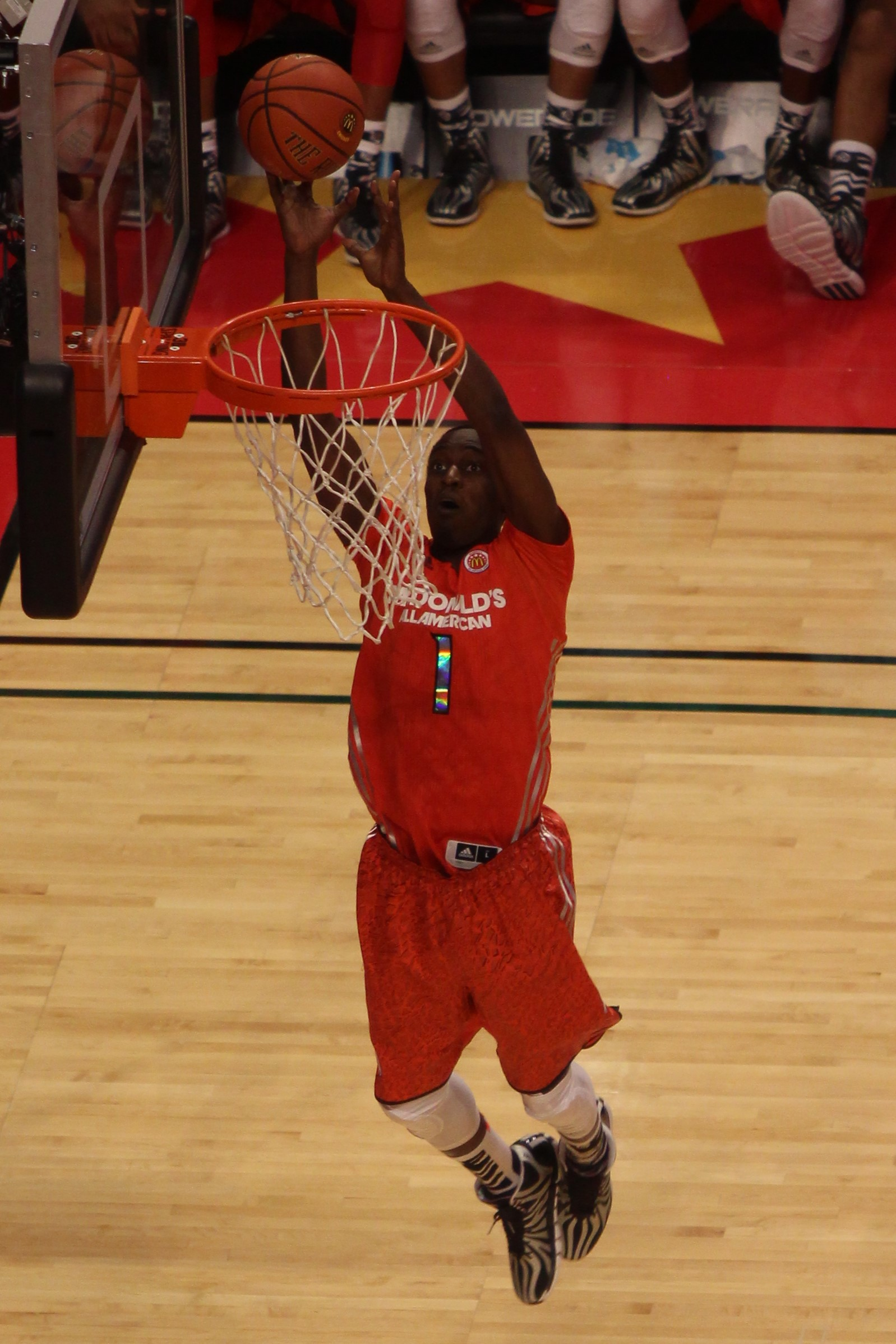
Theo Pinson

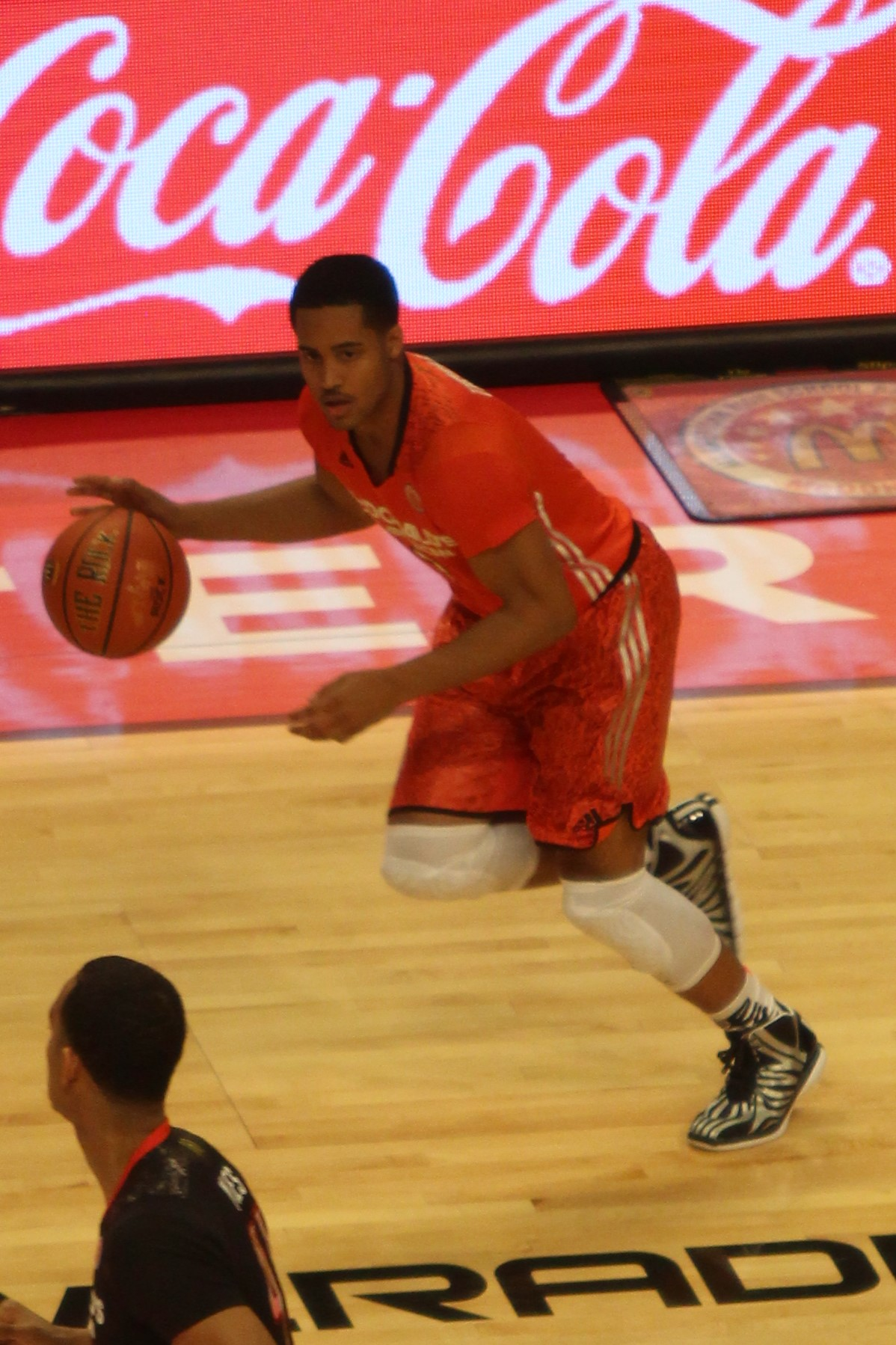
Melo Trimble

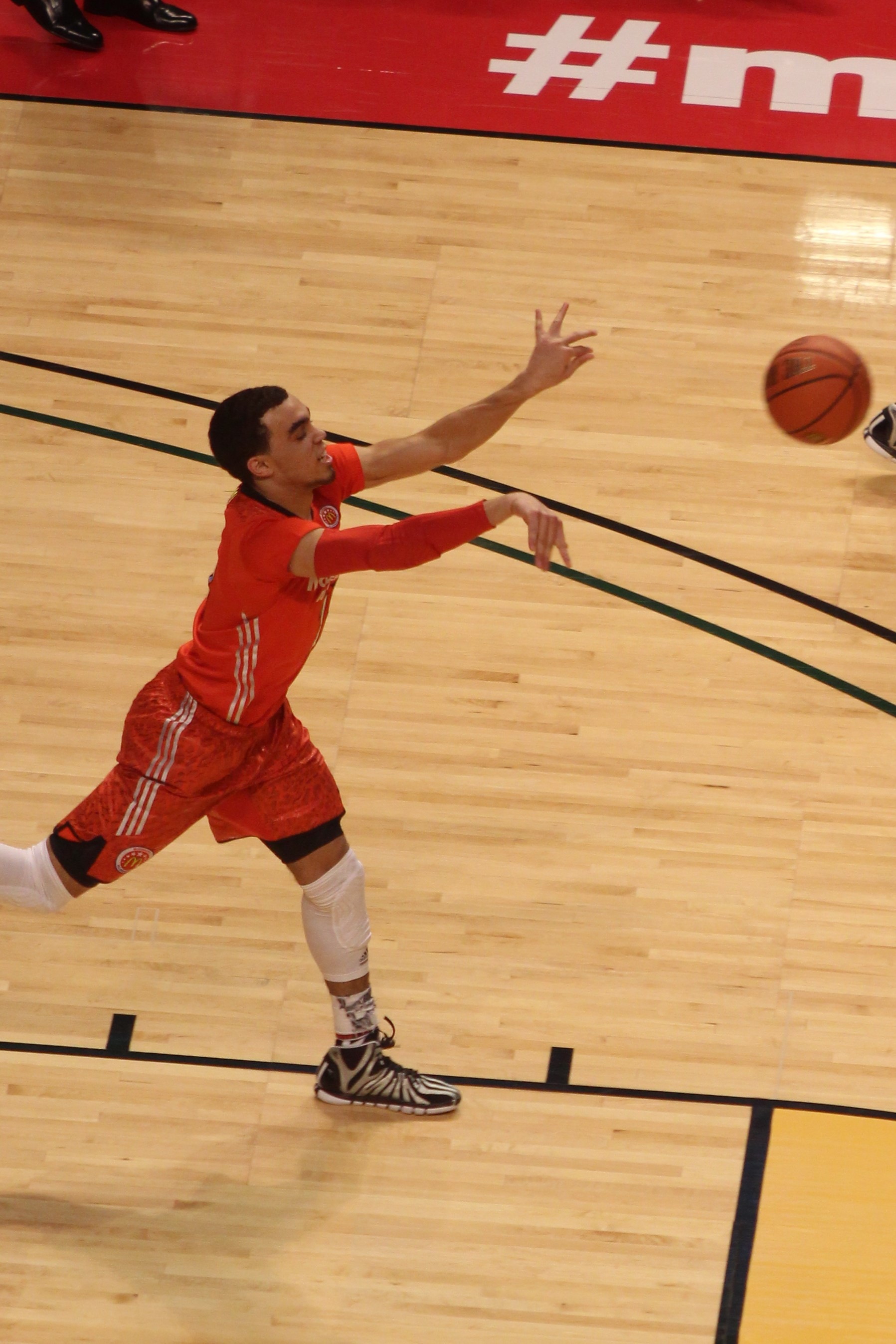
Tyus Jones

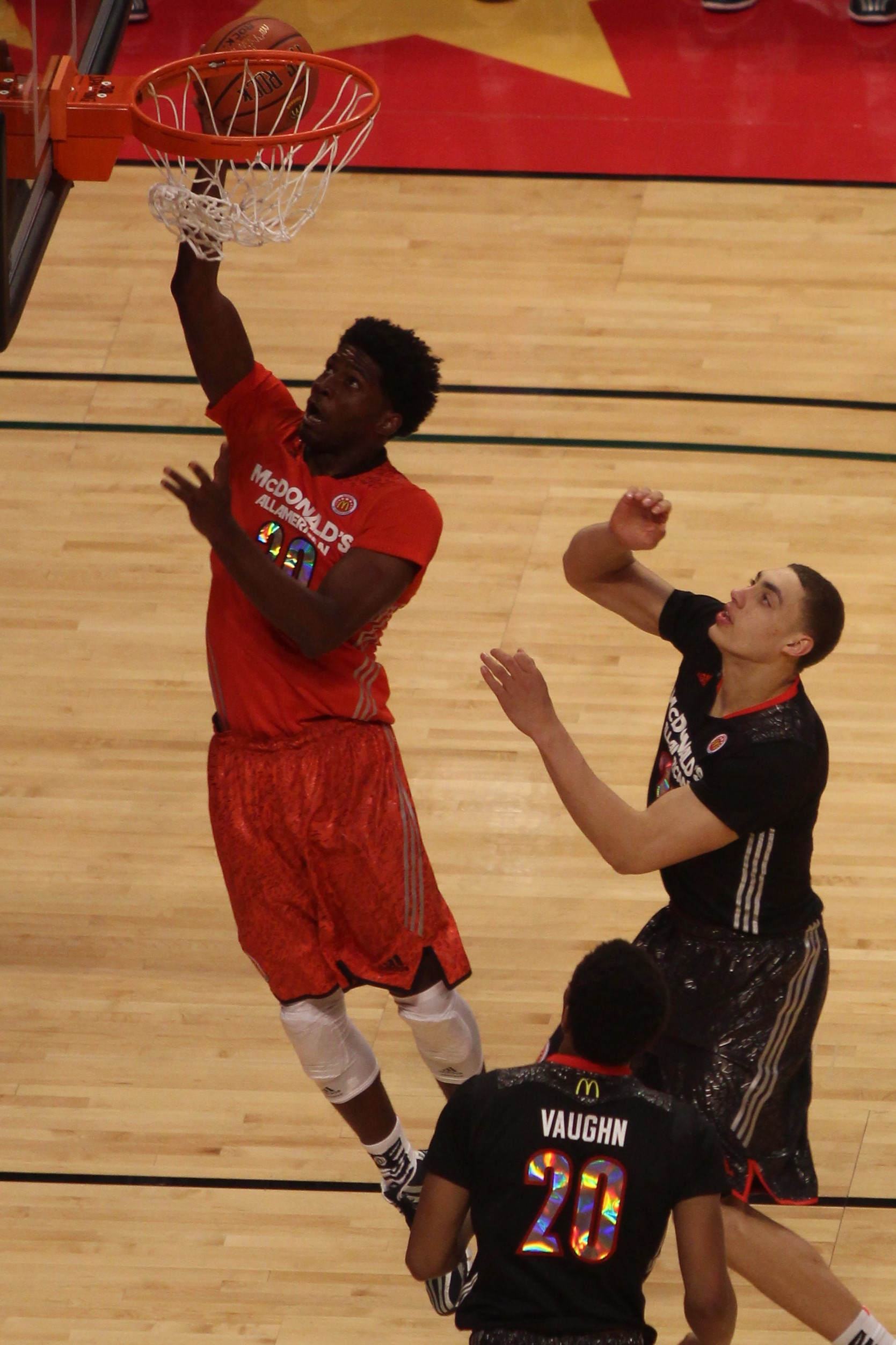
Justise Winslow

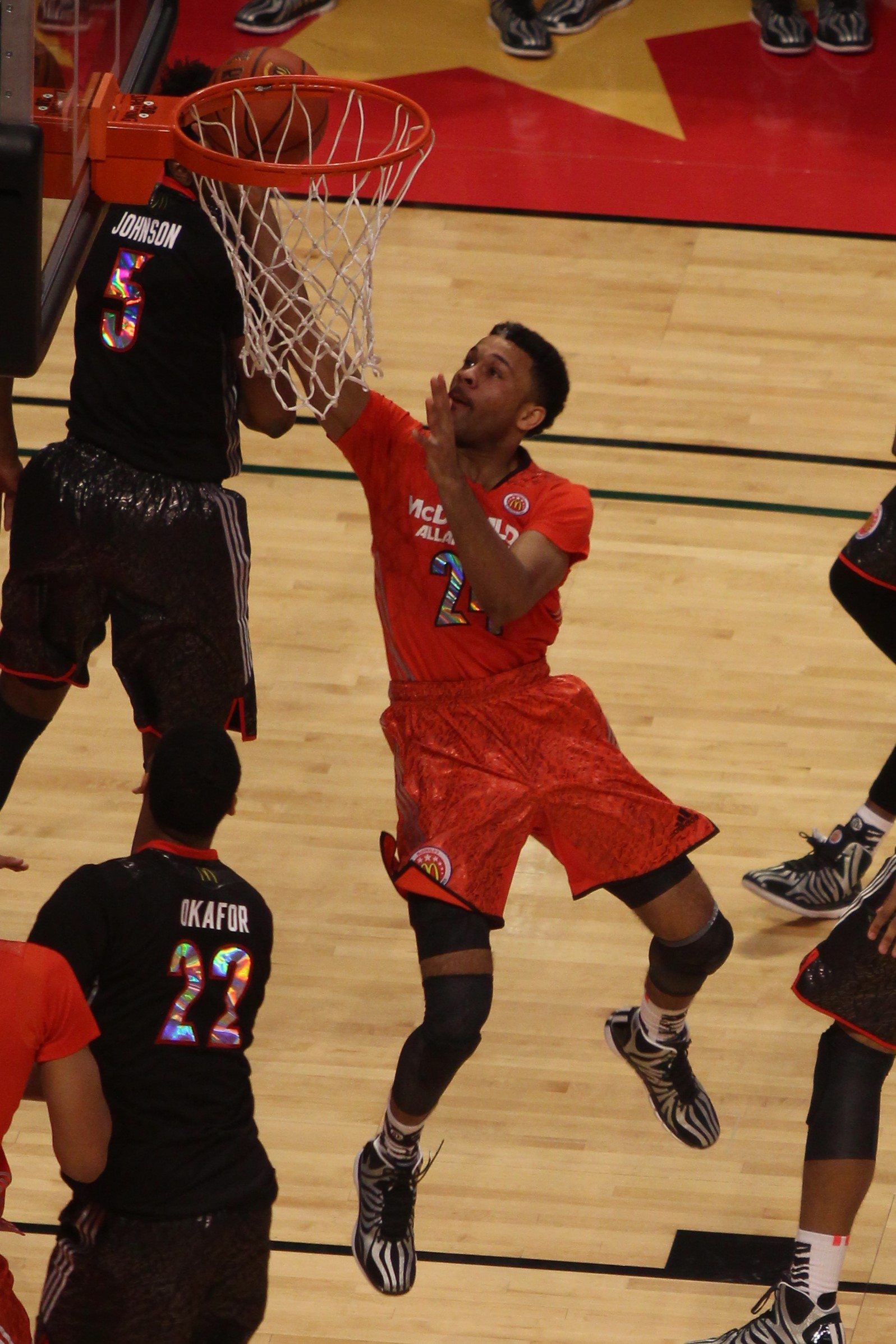
James Blackmon, Jr.

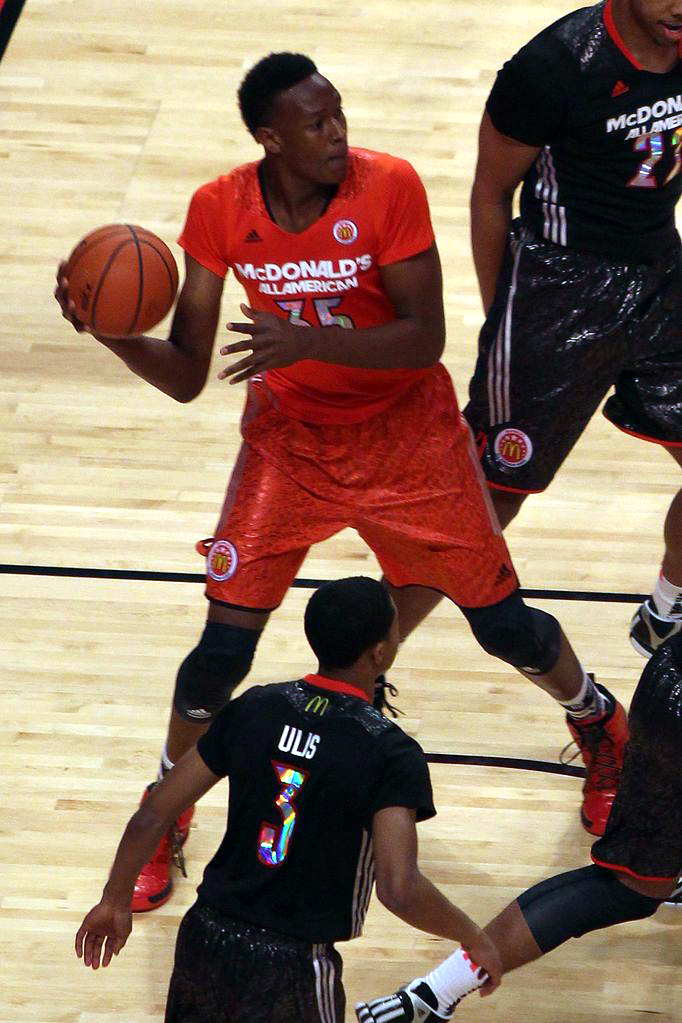
Myles Turner

=== West Roster ===
#	Name	Height	Weight	Position	Hometown	High school	College choice
22	Jahlil Okafor	6–11	275	C	Fort Smith, Arkansas	Whitney Young High School	Duke
0	Emmanuel Mudiay	6–5	200	PG	Kinshasa, Democratic Republic of the Congo	Grace Preparatory Academy	SMU
5	Stanley Johnson	6–6	245	SG	Fullerton, California	Mater Dei High School (Santa Ana, California)	Arizona
41	Trey Lyles	6–9	234	SF	Saskatoon, Canada	Arsenal Technical High School	Kentucky
12	Kelly Oubre Jr.	6–6	203	SF	Fort Bend County, Texas	Findlay College Prep	Kansas
20	Rashad Vaughn	6–6	210	SF	Minneapolis, Minnesota	Findlay College Prep	UNLV
11	Joel Berry II	6–0	195	PG	Apopka, Florida	Lake Highland Preparatory School	North Carolina
24	Reid Travis	6–8	238	PF	Minneapolis, Minnesota	DeLaSalle High School (Minneapolis)	Stanford
3	Tyler Ulis	5–10	150	PG	Chicago Heights, Illinois	Marian Catholic High School (Illinois)	Kentucky
1	Grayson Allen	6–4	200	SG	Jacksonville, Florida	Providence School	Duke
2	Devin Booker	6–6	205	SG	Moss Point, Mississippi	Moss Point High School	Kentucky
40	Thomas Welsh	7–0	255	C	Redondo Beach, California	Loyola High School	UCLA

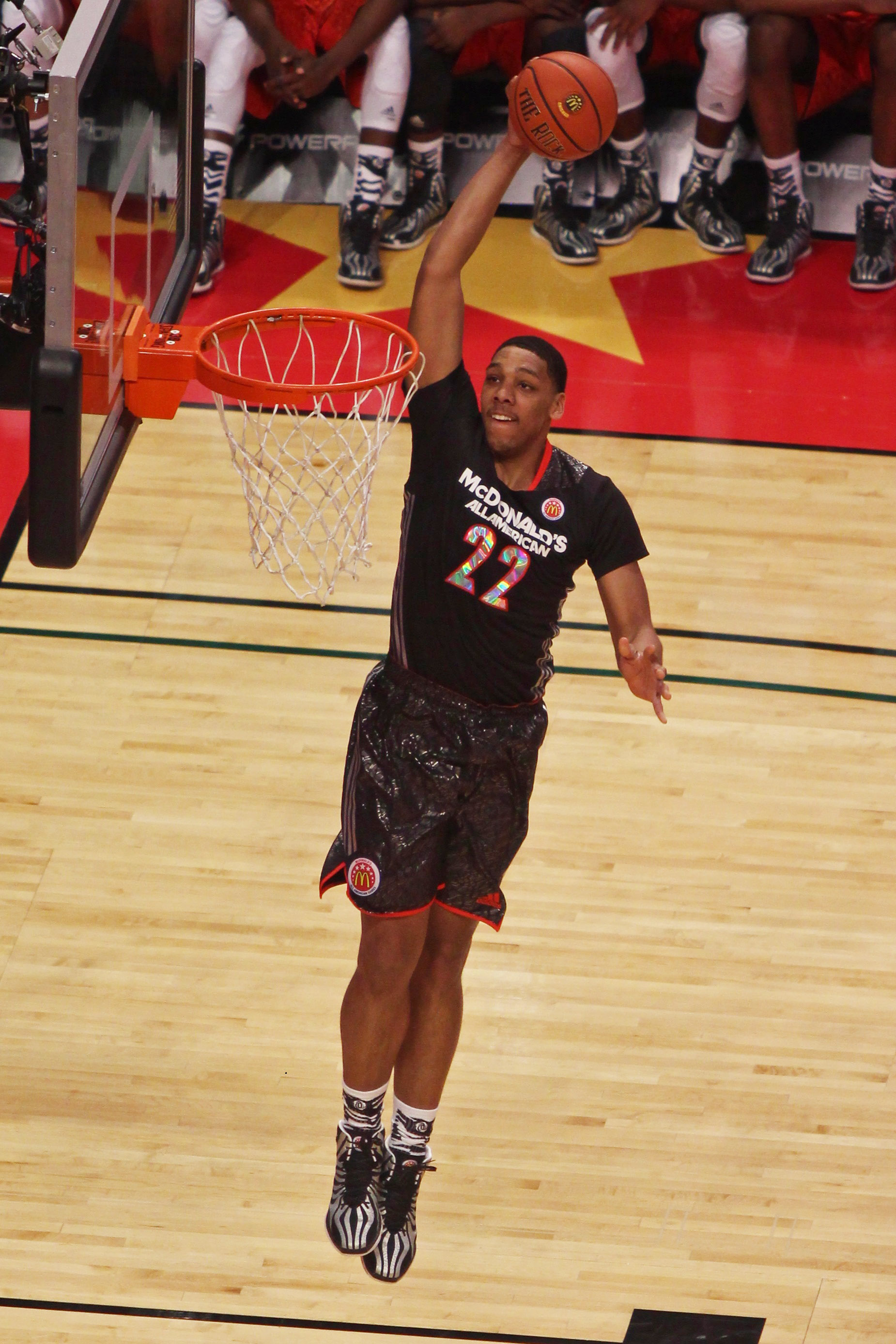
Jahlil Okafor

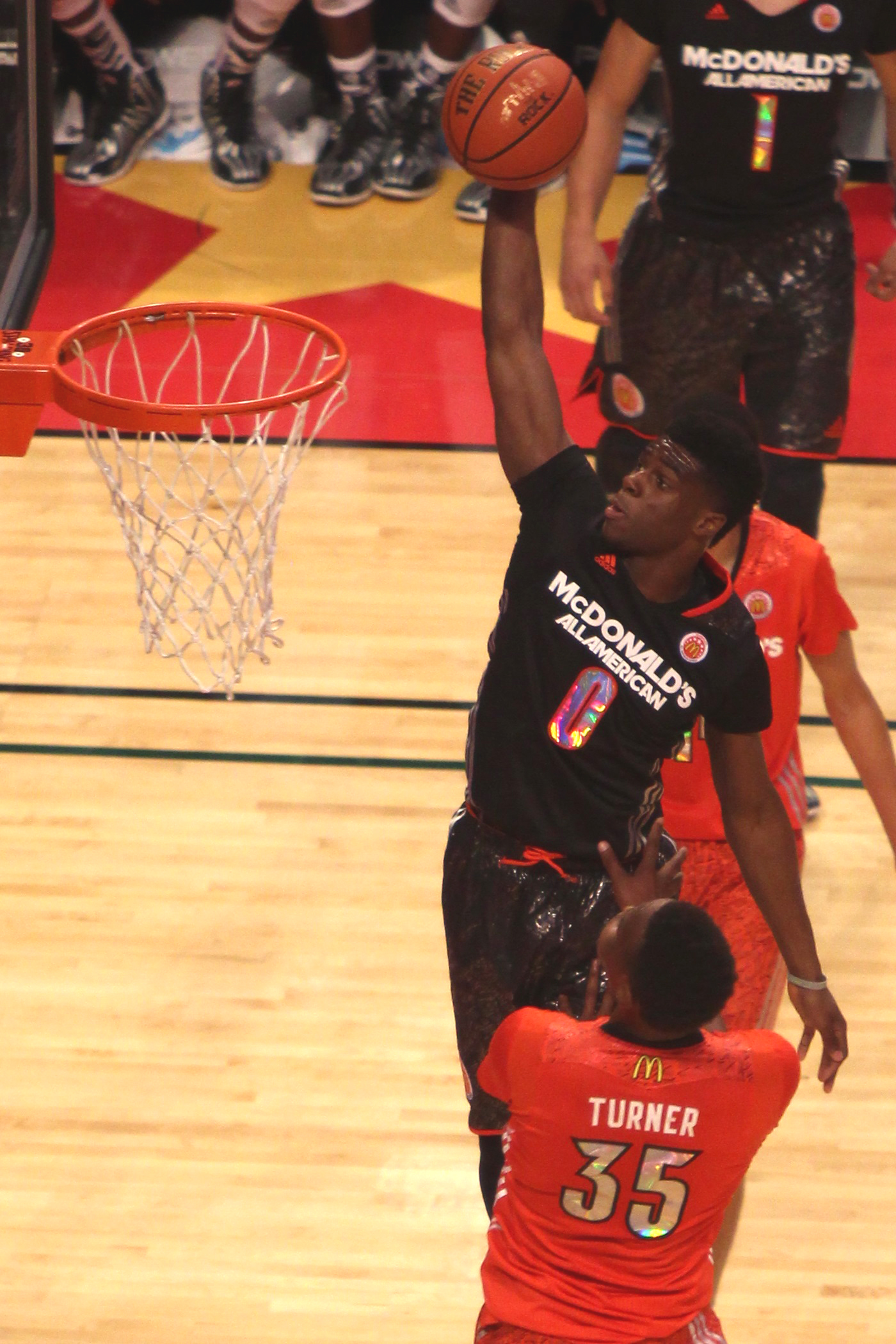
Emmanuel Mudiay

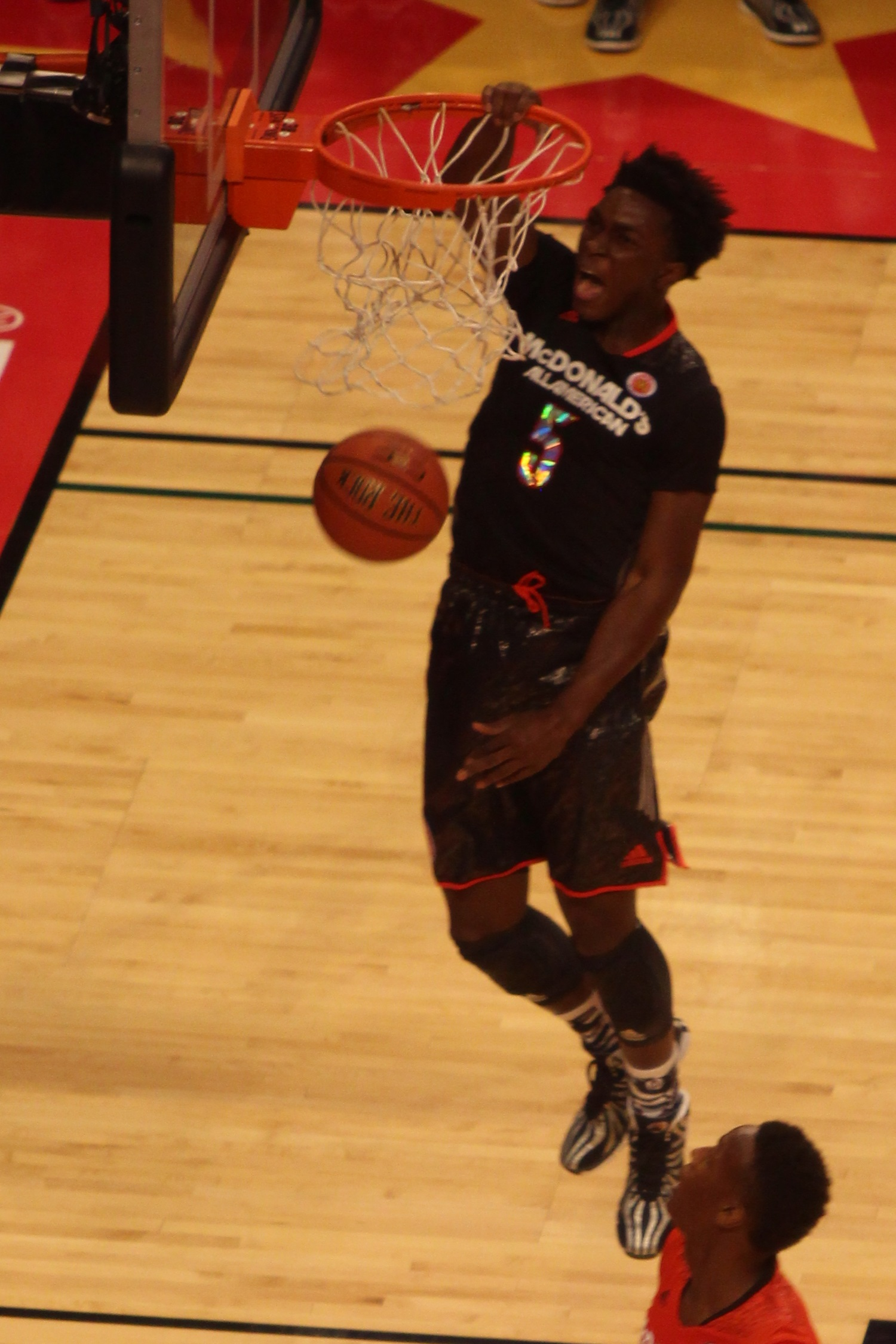
Stanley Johnson

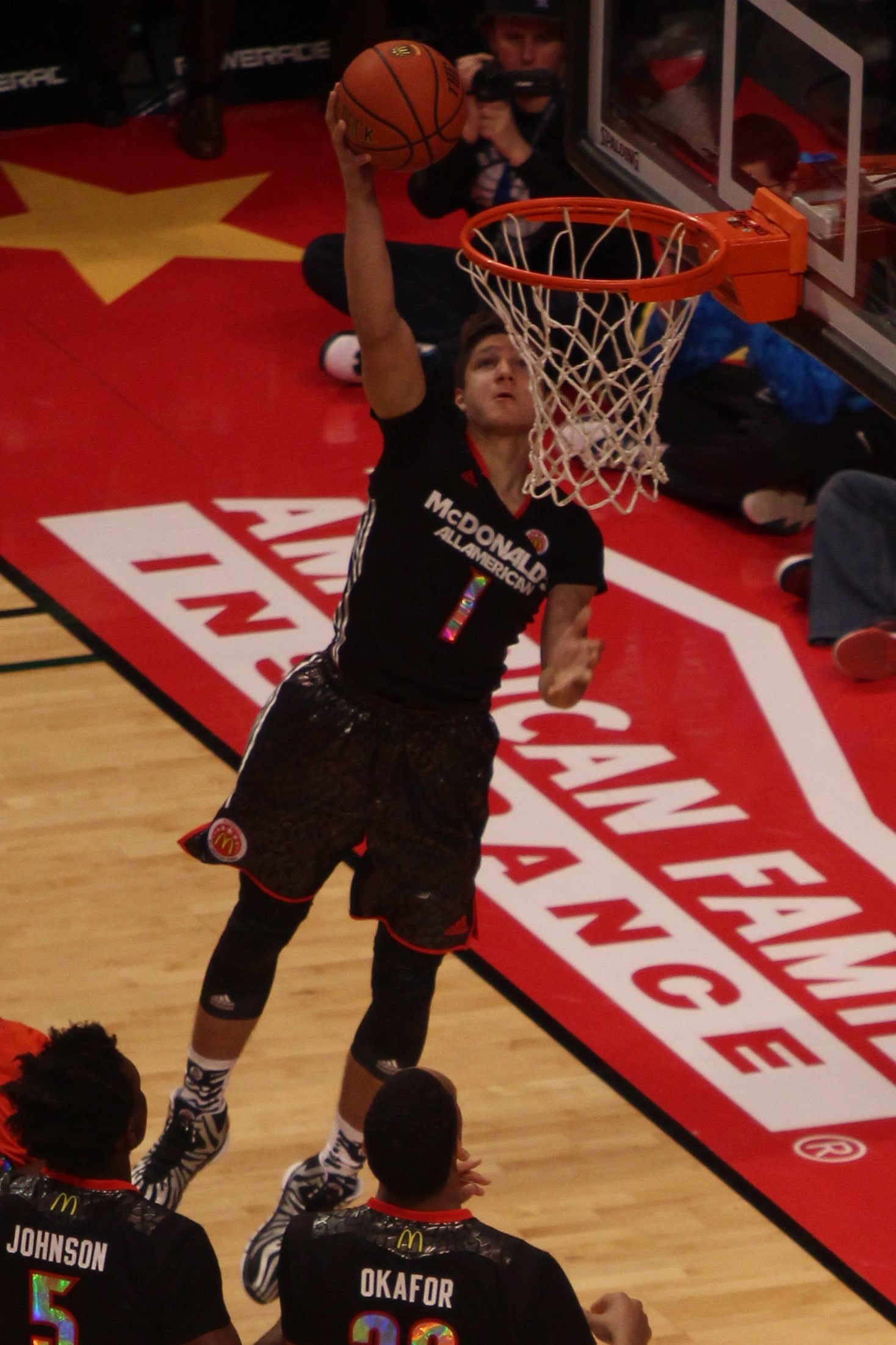
Grayson Allen

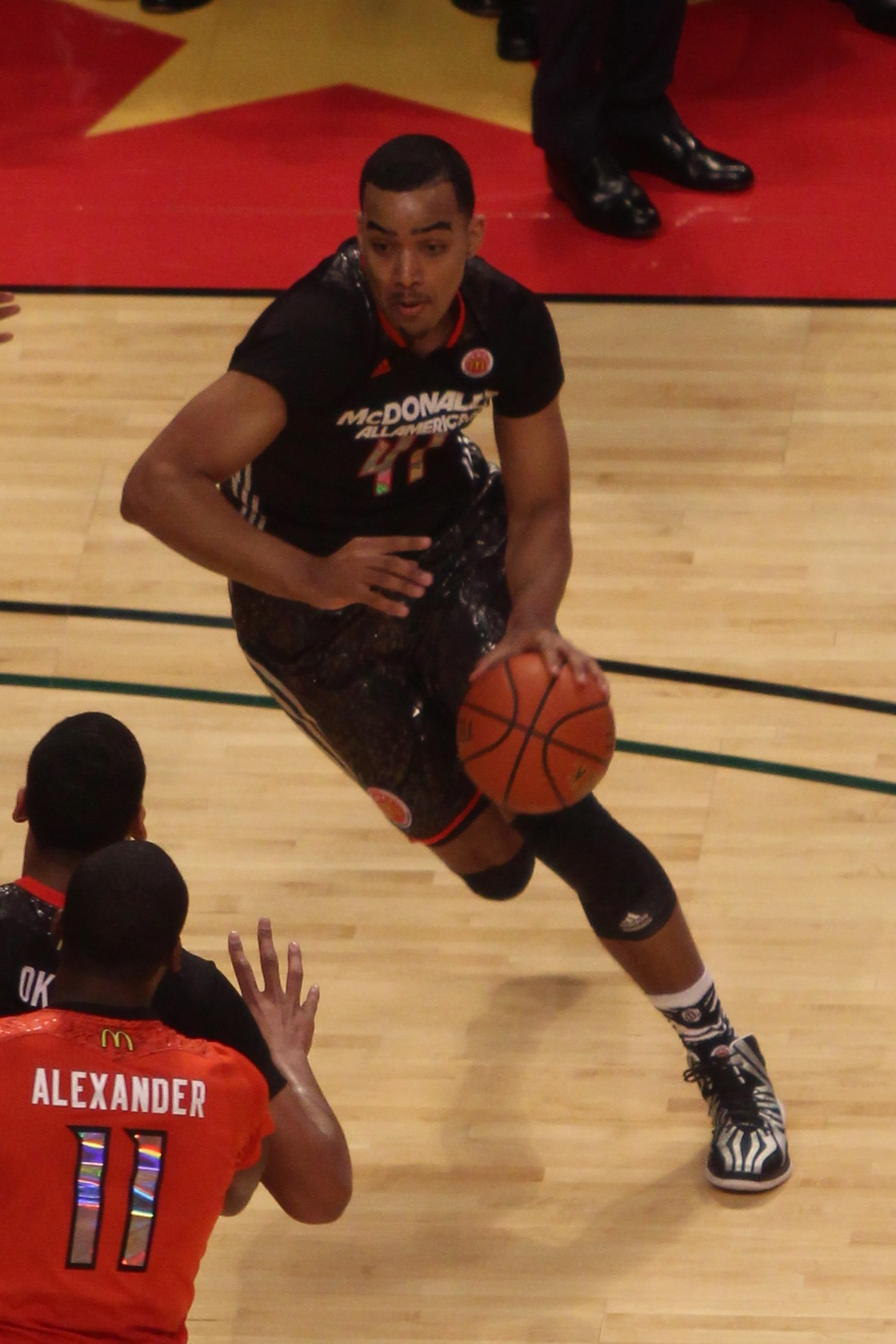
Trey Lyles

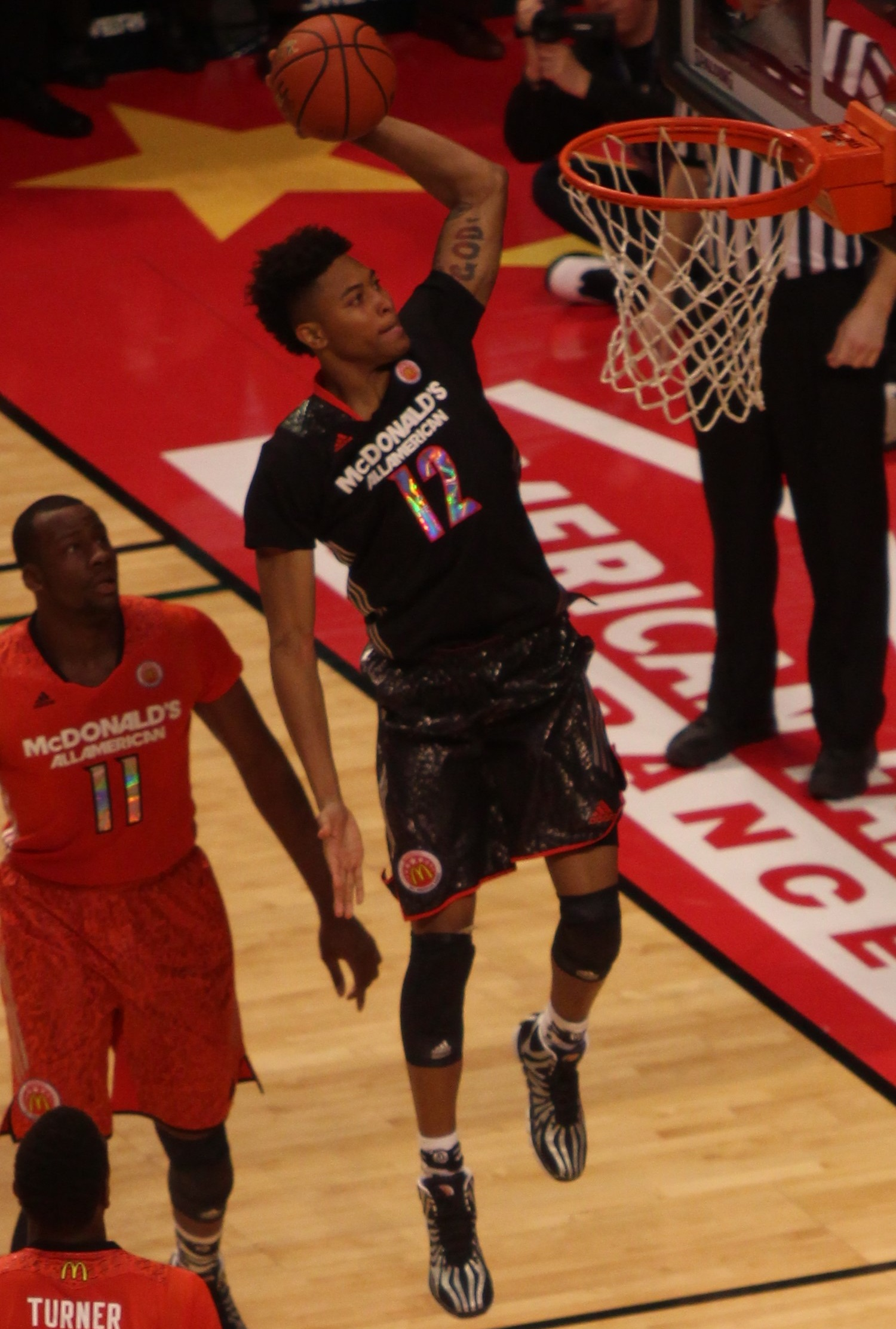
Kelly Oubre Jr.

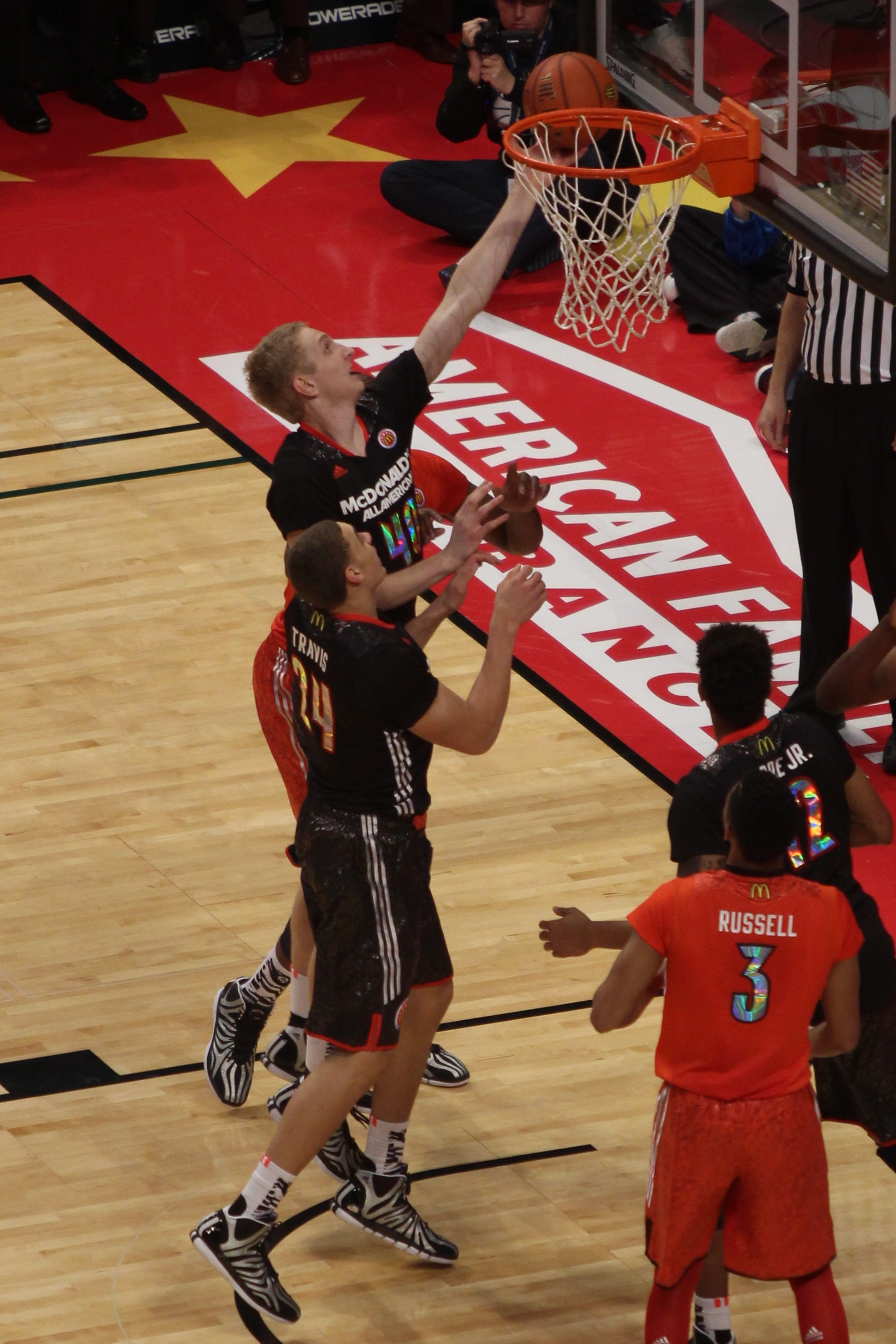
Thomas Welsh

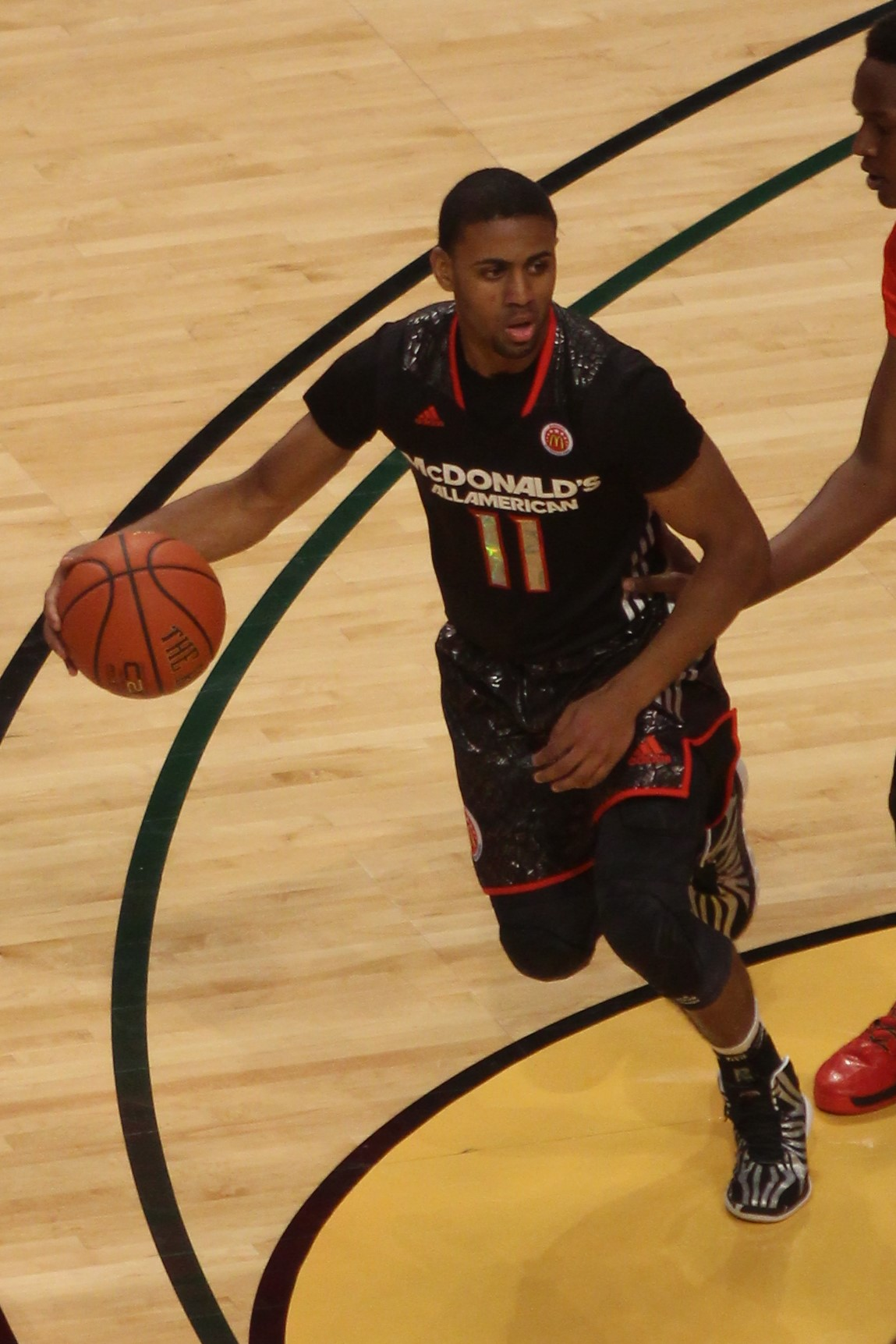
Joel Berry II

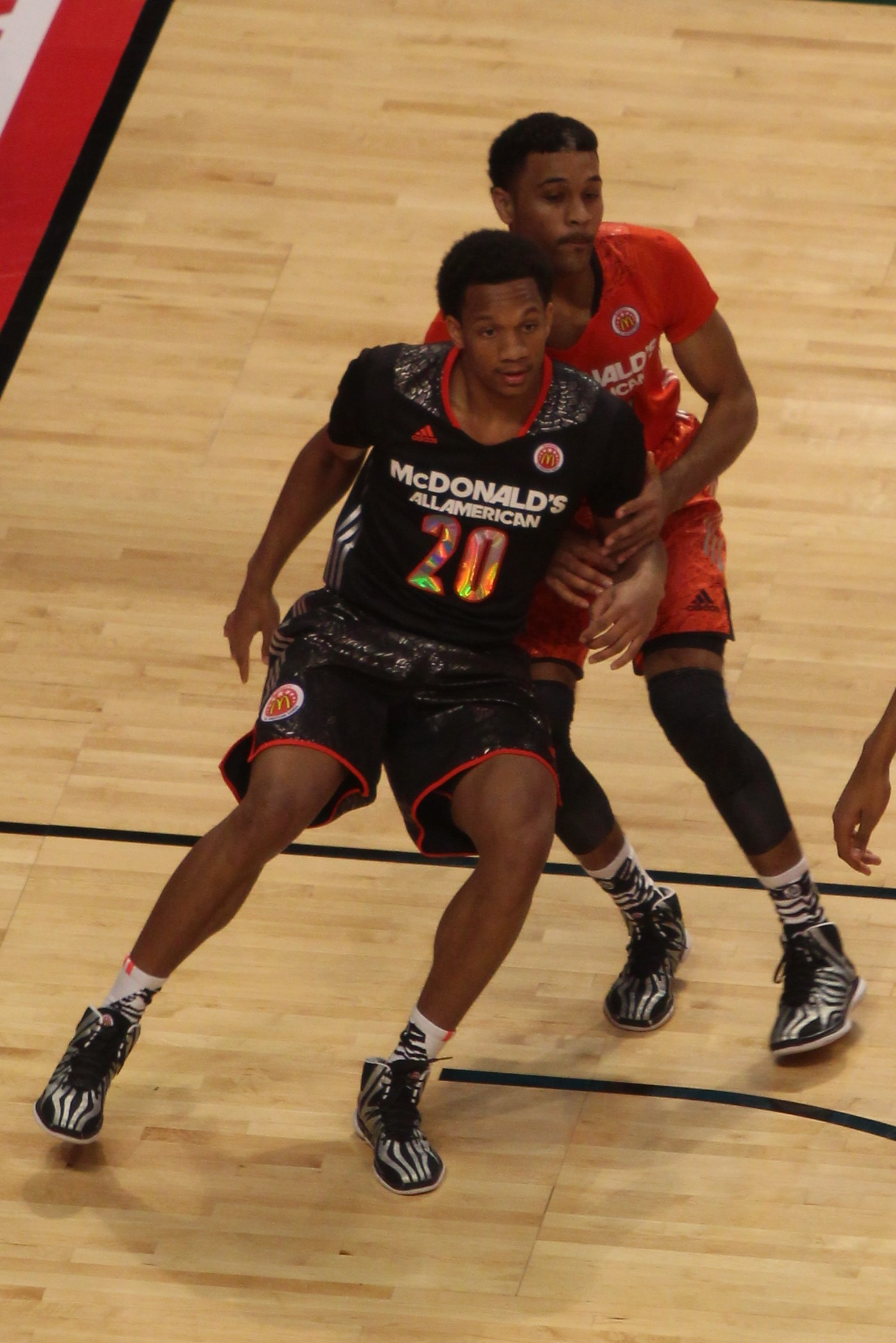
Rashad Vaughn

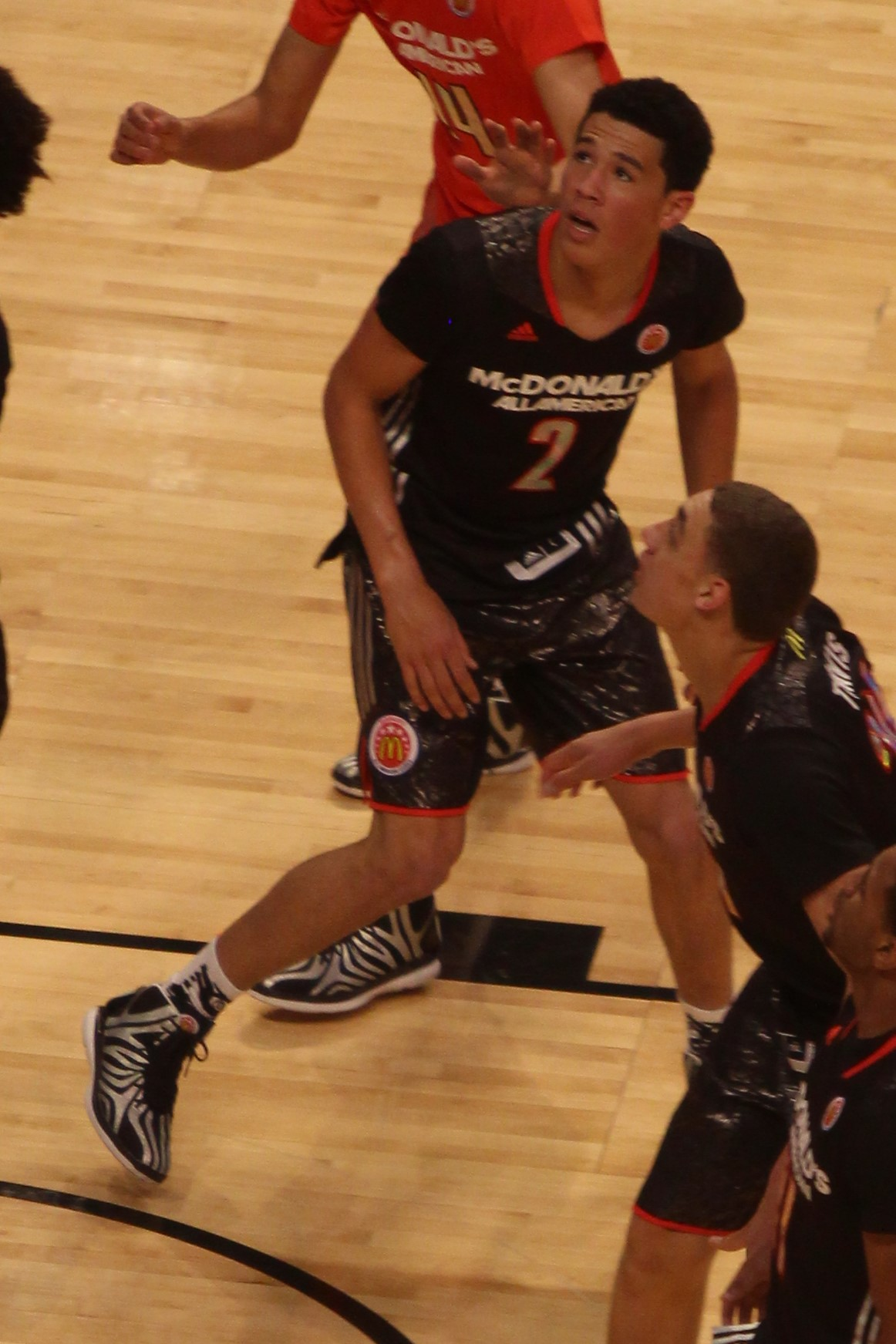
Devin Booker

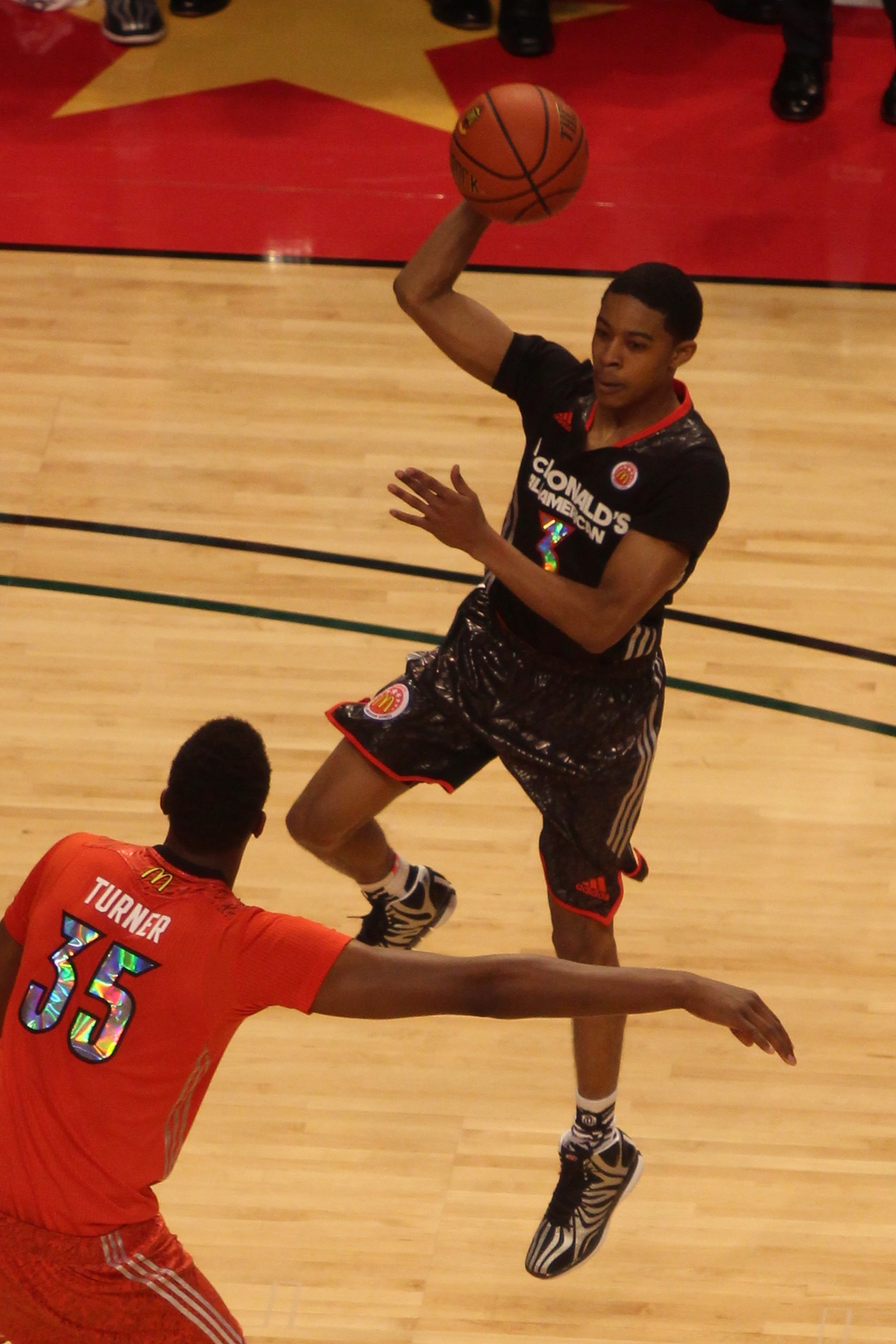
Tyler Ulis

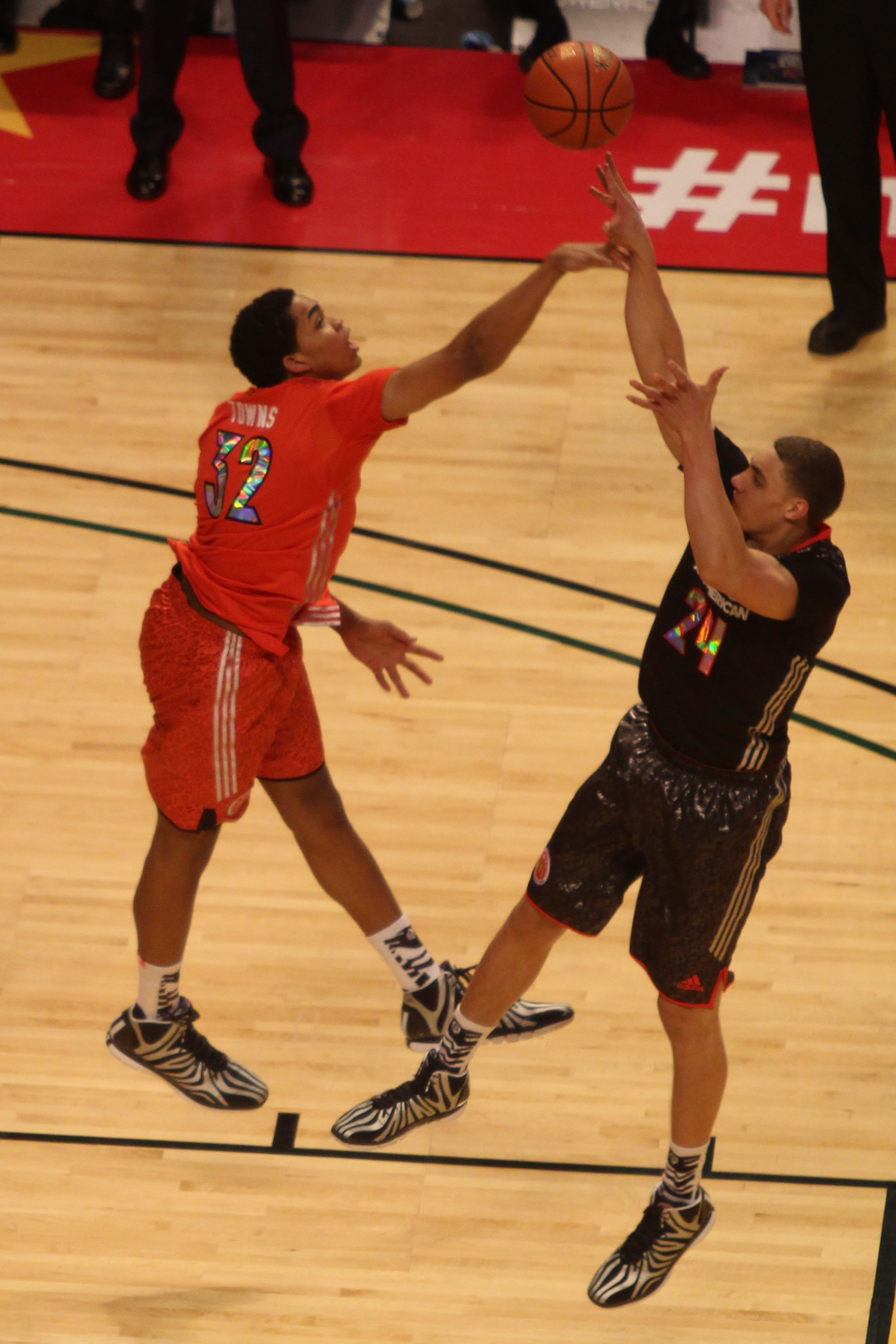
Reid Travis

=== Coaches ===
Frank Allocco (West Head Coach) Brian Sullivan (West Assistant Coach) Mark Noack (West Assistant Coach)

Lou Wilson (East Head Coach) Dale DeBerry (East Assistant Coach) Hank Lloyd (East Assistant Coach)

== Results ==
The West defeated the East by a 105–102 score. Okafor and Justin Jackson earned co-MVP of the game after posting 17 points and 7 rebounds and 23 points and 5 rebounds, for their respective West and East teams.

ESPN

April 2, 2014
08:30

boxscore

East	102–105	West
Scoring by half: 51–50, 51–55
Pts: Justin Jackson 23; Rebs: Cliff Alexander/Kevon Looney 11; Asts: Tyus Jones 10		Pts: Jahlil Okafor 17; Rebs: Trey Lyles 8 Asts: Emmanuel Mudiay 6

United Center, Chicago, IL
Referees: Kenneth Moreland, Bryce Cann, Mark Maslona
