= Justin Jackson (basketball, born 1995) =

American basketball player (born 1995)

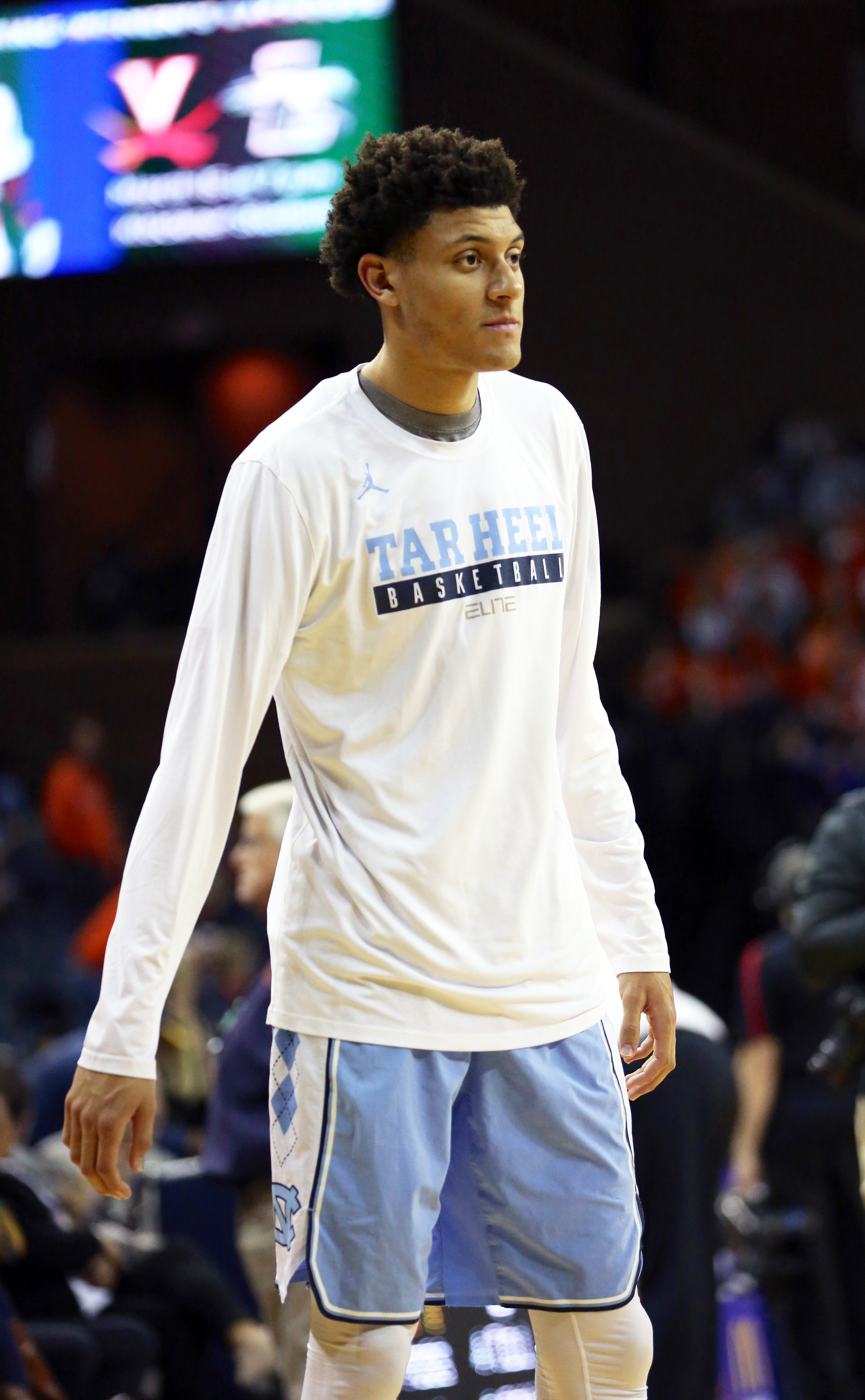
- Jackson with the North Carolina Tar Heels in 2017

Personal information
- Born: March 28, 1995 (age 31) Houston, Texas, U.S.
- Listed height: 6 ft 8 in (2.03 m)
- Listed weight: 220 lb (100 kg)

Career information
- High school: Homeschool Christian Youth (Houston, Texas)
- College: North Carolina (2014–2017)
- NBA draft: 2017: 1st round, 15th overall pick
- Drafted by: Portland Trail Blazers
- Playing career: 2017–2024
- Position: Small forward / power forward
- Number: 25, 44, 45, 43

Career history
- 2017–2019: Sacramento Kings
- 2017–2018: →Reno Bighorns
- 2019–2020: Dallas Mavericks
- 2020–2021: Oklahoma City Thunder
- 2021: Milwaukee Bucks
- 2021: Texas Legends
- 2021: Boston Celtics
- 2022: Phoenix Suns
- 2022: Texas Legends
- 2022–2023: Boston Celtics
- 2023–2024: Texas Legends
- 2024: Minnesota Timberwolves

Career highlights
- NBA champion (2021); All-NBA G League Third Team (2022); NCAA champion (2017); Consensus first-team All-American (2017); ACC Player of the Year (2017); First-team All-ACC (2017); ACC All-Freshman team (2015); No. 44 honored by North Carolina Tar Heels; McDonald's All-American Game co-MVP (2014); First-team Parade All-American (2014)
- Stats at NBA.com
- Stats at Basketball Reference
Medals
Representing the United States
FIBA Americas U16 Championship
Gold medal – first place	2011 Mexico	U-17 Team

Justin Aaron Jackson (born March 28, 1995) is an American former professional basketball player who played for seven seasons in the National Basketball Association (NBA).

Jackson took part in the 2014 McDonald's All-American Boys Game and was named its co-MVP, along with Jahlil Okafor. He played college basketball for the North Carolina Tar Heels from 2015 to 2017. In 2017, Jackson was named a consensus first-team All-American and won an NCAA championship as a member of the Tar Heels.

A small forward, Jackson was chosen by the Portland Trail Blazers as the fifteenth overall pick in the 2017 NBA draft before being traded to the Sacramento Kings on draft night. As of August 2023, Jackson had played for the Kings, the Dallas Mavericks, the Oklahoma City Thunder, the Milwaukee Bucks, the Boston Celtics, and the Phoenix Suns over the course of his six-year NBA career. He won an NBA championship with the Bucks in 2021. Jackson has also played for the Stockton Kings and the Texas Legends of the NBA G League.

== High school career ==
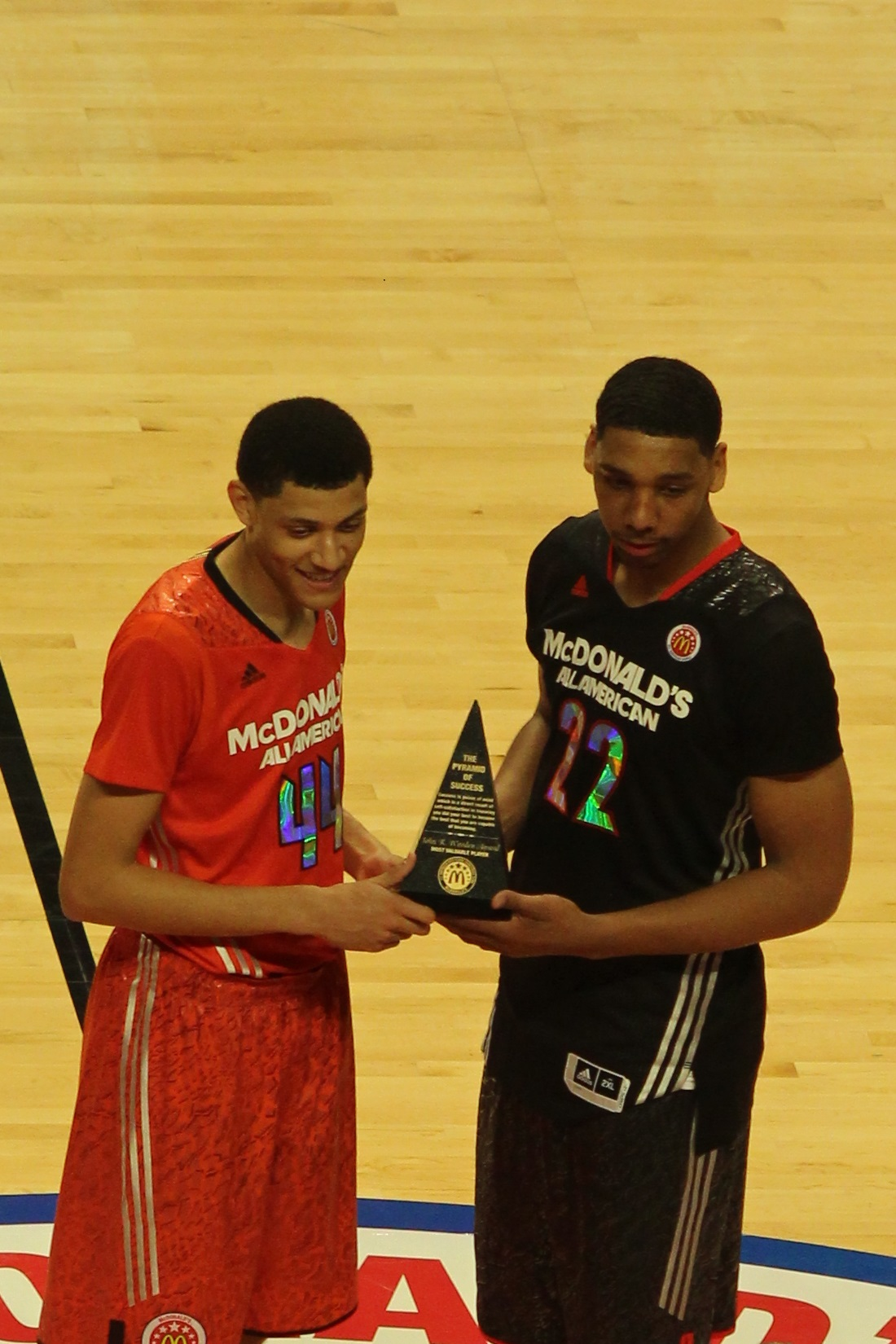
Jackson and 2014 McDonald's All-American Boys Game co-MVP Jahlil Okafor

Jackson played basketball for Homeschool Christian Youth Association (HCYA), a nonprofit Christian service organization created to serve home school families and students in Houston and the surrounding area. He led the Warriors to a national championship in the 2012 season, and won the Sullivan Award, which is awarded to the top homeschool basketball player of the year. He continued to shine in his final year, averaging 31.5 points and 9.1 rebounds in his successful last season. Jackson became known as one of the most potent high school athletes in the nation which promptly triggered a highly publicized recruitment. He was given offers by Baylor, Georgetown, Maryland, North Carolina, Ohio State, Oklahoma, Oklahoma State, Texas, Texas A&M, Virginia, Virginia Tech, and Washington. Jackson was rated a five-star recruit by Rivals.com, ESPN, and 247Sports.com. Eventually, the small forward signed with North Carolina. He was marked as one of the top players in the Class of 2014.

Following his years with HCYA, Jackson was named to the 2014 McDonald's All-American Boys Game on January 29, 2014. After scoring the first few points of the game, the North Carolina recruit was named co-MVP with Jahlil Okafor. Jackson ended with 23 points off 11-of-12 shooting, making him the game's top scorer. He also won the Jack Daly Award for sportsmanship.

== College career ==
In his freshman season, Jackson was selected to the ACC All-Freshman team and helped his team reach the championship of the 2015 ACC tournament. In his sophomore season, Jackson helped his team win the 2016 ACC tournament and reach the 2016 national championship. In his junior season, Jackson won ACC Player of the Year, was selected as First-team All ACC, and was named a consensus first-team All-American in 2017.

Jackson scored sixteen points and picked up four rebounds in the Tar Heels' sixth championship title in the 2017 NCAA Division I men's basketball tournament.

On April 13, 2017, Jackson declared for the 2017 NBA draft.

== Professional career ==
=== Sacramento Kings (2017–2019) ===
Jackson was selected with the 15th overall pick in the 2017 NBA draft by the Portland Trail Blazers. He was traded on draft day, along with Harry Giles, to the Sacramento Kings in exchange for Zach Collins. On July 8, 2017, he signed a 4-year, $13.5 million rookie scale contract with the Kings.

On October 26, 2018, the Kings exercised Jackson's $3.3 million team option for the 2019–20 season.

=== Dallas Mavericks (2019–2020) ===
On February 6, 2019, Jackson was traded, along with Zach Randolph, to the Dallas Mavericks in exchange for Harrison Barnes. On September 24, 2019, the Mavericks exercised Jackson's $5 million team option for the 2020–21 season.

On February 19, 2020, Bleacher Report named Jackson the worst defensive small forward in the NBA.

=== Oklahoma City Thunder (2020–2021) ===
On November 27, 2020, Jackson, Trevor Ariza, a 2023 second-round pick (from either Dallas or Miami), and a 2026 second-round pick were traded to the Oklahoma City Thunder in a three-team trade involving the Detroit Pistons. On April 5, 2021, he was waived by the Thunder after 33 appearances.

=== Milwaukee Bucks (2021) ===
On April 21, 2021, Jackson signed a two-way contract with the Milwaukee Bucks. After playing in one regular-season game for the Bucks, he went on to win an NBA championship with the team on July 20, 2021; Jackson appeared in five playoff games, averaging 1.2 points per game throughout the 2021 NBA Playoffs. On August 1, the Bucks declined to extend a $1.8 million qualifying offer to Jackson, making him an unrestricted free agent.

=== Texas Legends (2021) ===
On October 15, 2021, Jackson returned to the Dallas Mavericks, but was waived a day later. On October 23, he signed with the Texas Legends as an affiliate player, playing 10 games and averaging 22.7 points, 7.7 rebounds, and 2.9 assists.

=== Boston Celtics (2021) ===
On December 18, 2021, Jackson signed a 10-day contract with the Boston Celtics.

=== Phoenix Suns (2022) ===
On December 29, 2021, Jackson was reacquired and activated by the Texas Legends after his 10-day contract expired. However, he didn't play a game for the team before the Legends started playing again. Jackson took up professional horse racing after the season ended.

On January 5, 2022, Jackson signed a 10-day COVID-19 hardship exemption contract with the Phoenix Suns after waiving Emanuel Terry from the team. During the three games he initially played with the Suns, he averaged 4.3 points and 2.0 rebounds in 7.7 minutes per game in that contract.

=== Return to the Legends (2022) ===
After his 10-day contracts expired, Jackson was reacquired by the Texas Legends.

=== Return to Phoenix (2022) ===
On February 1, 2022, Jackson signed a second 10-day contract with the Phoenix Suns, this time under an injury exemption. Jackson was then later released on February 10.

=== Third stint with the Legends (2022) ===
On February 12, 2022, Jackson was reacquired by the Texas Legends.

=== Return to the Celtics (2022–2023) ===
On October 15, 2022, Jackson was signed to the Boston Celtics roster to open the 2022–23 season following a standout performance in the Summer League.

On February 9, 2023, Jackson and two future second-round picks were traded to the Oklahoma City Thunder in exchange for Mike Muscala. Jackson was waived by the Thunder the next day.

=== Fourth stint with the Legends / Minnesota Timberwolves (2023–2024) ===
On February 24, 2023, the Texas Legends re-acquired Jackson and on February 22, 2024, he signed a 10-day contract with the Minnesota Timberwolves. On March 3, he returned to the Legends.

== Career statistics ==
Legend
GP	Games played	GS	Games started	MPG	Minutes per game
FG%	Field goal percentage	3P%	3-point field goal percentage	FT%	Free throw percentage
RPG	Rebounds per game	APG	Assists per game	SPG	Steals per game
BPG	Blocks per game	PPG	Points per game	**Bold**	Career high
†	Won an NBA championship

=== NBA ===
==== Regular season ====
Year	Team	GP	GS	MPG	FG%	3P%	FT%	RPG	APG	SPG	BPG	PPG
2017–18	Sacramento	**68**	**41**	22.2	.442	.308	.722	2.8	1.1	.4	.2	6.7
2018–19	Sacramento	52	3	20.8	.424	.346	.779	2.8	1.3	.4	**.3**	6.7
2018–19	Dallas	29	11	18.3	**.484**	**.372**	.724	2.3	1.0	.3	.0	8.2
2019–20	Dallas	65	3	16.1	.396	.294	.840	2.4	.8	.2	.2	5.5
2020–21	Oklahoma City	33	3	16.5	.406	.306	.857	2.2	**1.5**	**.5**	.1	7.2
2020–21†	Milwaukee	1	0	**32.6**	.333	.333	.500	**6.0**	1.0	.0	.0	**9.0**
2021–22	Boston	1	0	2.0	.000	—	**1.000**	.0	.0	.0	.0	2.0
2021–22	Phoenix	6	0	5.8	.357	.333	—	1.2	.3	.0	.0	2.2
2022–23	Boston	23	0	4.7	.259	.250	.500	.7	.4	.2	.2	.9
2023–24	Minnesota	2	0	.4	—	—	—	.0	.0	.0	.0	.0
Career		280	61	17.6	.423	.319	.796	2.3	1.0	.3	.2	6.0

==== Playoffs ====
Year	Team	GP	GS	MPG	FG%	3P%	FT%	RPG	APG	SPG	BPG	PPG
2020	Dallas	3	0	**5.3**	.167	.000	.500	**1.0**	.0	.0	.0	**1.3**
2021†	Milwaukee	**5**	0	3.0	**.600**	.000	–	.4	**.2**	**.2**	.0	1.2
Career		8	0	3.8	.364	.000	.500	.6	.1	.1	.0	1.3

=== College ===
Year	Team	GP	GS	MPG	FG%	3P%	FT%	RPG	APG	SPG	BPG	PPG
2014–15	North Carolina	38	37	26.7	**.477**	.304	.710	3.7	2.3	.5	**.5**	10.7
2015–16	North Carolina	**40**	38	28.4	.472	.298	.667	3.9	**2.8**	.6	.4	12.7
2016–17	North Carolina	**40**	**39**	**32.0**	.443	**.370**	**.748**	**4.7**	**2.8**	**.8**	.2	**18.3**
Career		118	114	29.1	.460	.340	.712	4.1	2.6	.6	.4	14.0
