= Trey Lyles =

Canadian-American basketball player (born 1995)

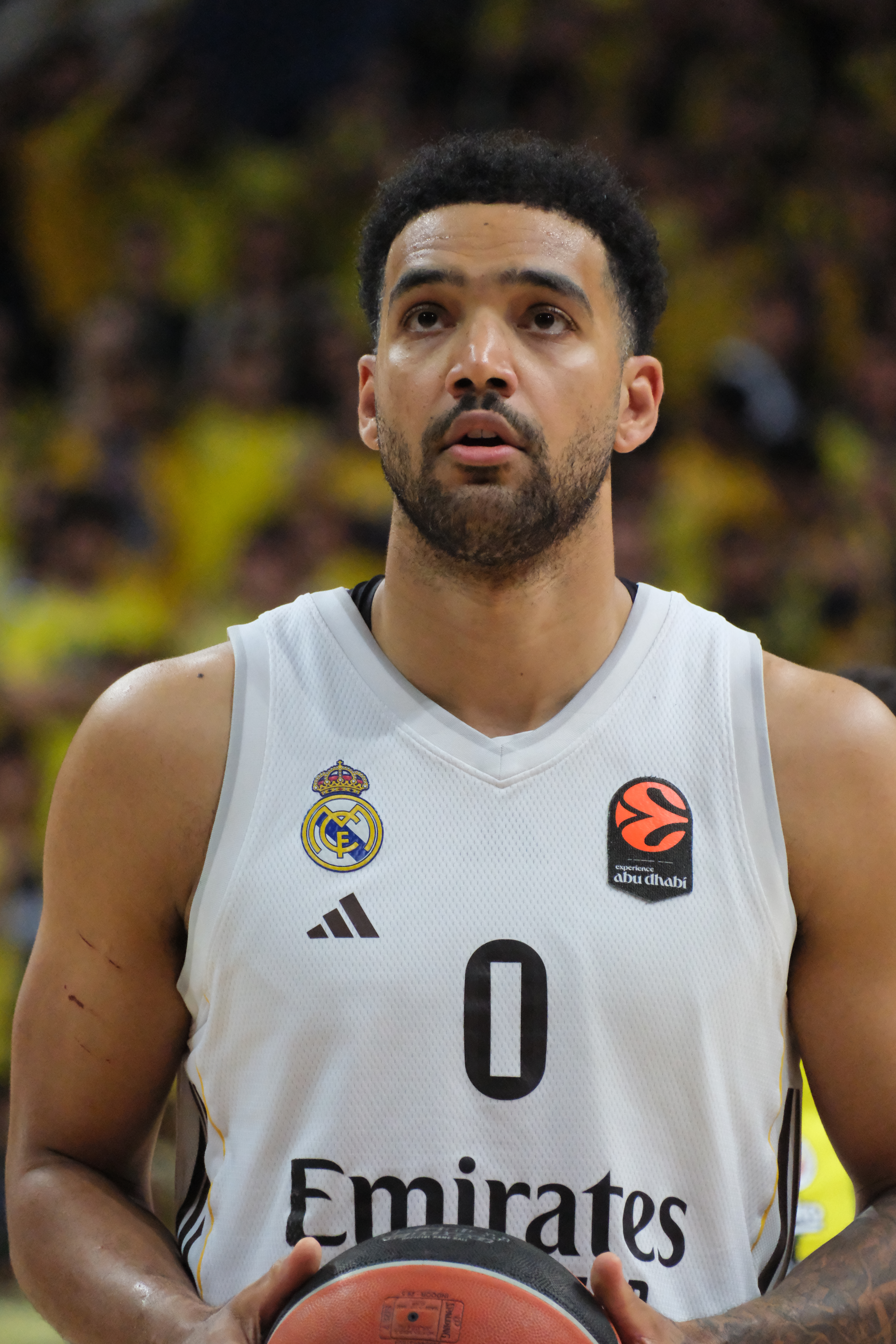
- Lyles with Real Madrid in 2026

No. 41 – Minnesota Timberwolves
- Position: Power forward
- League: NBA

Personal information
- Born: November 5, 1995 (age 31) Saskatoon, Saskatchewan, Canada
- Listed height: 6 ft 9 in (2.06 m)
- Listed weight: 234 lb (106 kg)

Career information
- High school: Arsenal Tech (Indianapolis, Indiana)
- College: Kentucky (2014–2015)
- NBA draft: 2015: 1st round, 12th overall pick
- Drafted by: Utah Jazz
- Playing career: 2015–present

Career history
- 2015–2017: Utah Jazz
- 2017–2019: Denver Nuggets
- 2019–2021: San Antonio Spurs
- 2021–2022: Detroit Pistons
- 2022–2025: Sacramento Kings
- 2025–2026: Real Madrid
- 2026–present: Minnesota Timberwolves

Career highlights
- SEC All-Freshman Team (2015); McDonald's All-American (2014); First-team Parade All-American (2014); Indiana Mr. Basketball (2014)
- Stats at NBA.com
- Stats at Basketball Reference

Trey Anthony Lyles (born November 5, 1995) is a Canadian-American professional basketball player for the Minnesota Timberwolves of the National Basketball Association (NBA). He was drafted by the Utah Jazz following his freshman season at the University of Kentucky. Lyles has also played for the Denver Nuggets, San Antonio Spurs, Detroit Pistons, and Sacramento Kings.

== Early life ==
Trey Lyles was born in Saskatoon, Saskatchewan to an American father and Canadian mother, and moved to Indianapolis, Indiana at the age of seven.

== High school career ==
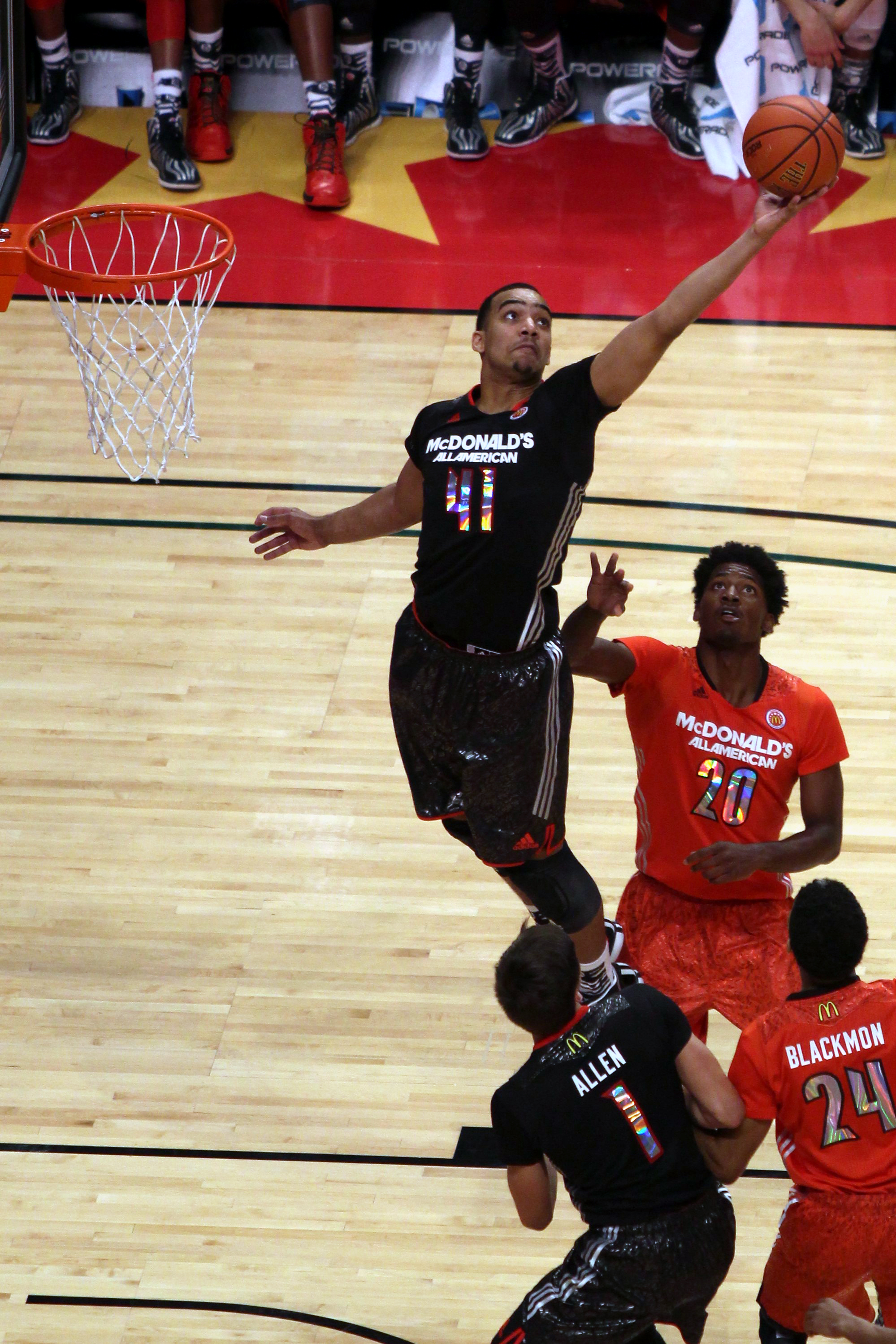
Lyles in the 2014 McDonald's All-American Boys Game

Entering his senior year of high school in Indianapolis, Lyles was ranked as one of the best high school basketball players in the U.S. and was recruited heavily by Kentucky, Indiana, and Louisville. Lyles originally committed to Indiana in September 2010 during his freshman year of high school, but then later decommitted in August 2012. Lyles signed a letter of intent on November 5, 2013, to play and study at the University of Kentucky.

During his senior year of high school, Lyles averaged 23.7 points, 12.9 rebounds and 3.5 assists and led Arsenal Tech to the IHSAA Class 4A State Championship game with a 63–59 victory over Lake Central. Following the conclusion of his senior season, Lyles was voted Indiana Mr. Basketball over fellow high school seniors Trevon Bluiett, who signed to play at Xavier University and James Blackmon Jr. who signed with Indiana University.

College recruiting
Name	Hometown	School	Height	Weight	Commit date
Trey Lyles; F	Saskatoon, Saskatchewan	Arsenal Tech	6 ft 10 in (2.08 m)	235 lb (107 kg)	Nov 5, 2013
Trey Lyles; F	Recruit ratings: Scout: Rivals: 247Sports: ESPN:				
Overall recruit ranking: Scout: 11 Rivals: 13 247Sports: 10 ESPN: 6
Note: In many cases, Scout, Rivals, 247Sports, On3, and ESPN may conflict in their listings of height and weight.; In these cases, the average was taken. ESPN grades are on a 100-point scale.; Sources: "Kentucky 2014 Basketball Commitments". Rivals.; "2014 Kentucky Basketball Commits". Scout.; "ESPN". ESPN.; "Scout.com Team Recruiting Rankings". Scout.; "2014 Team Ranking". Rivals.; "Kentucky 2014 Basketball Commits". 247Sports.

== College career ==
Lyles enrolled at Kentucky on June 12, 2014. Due to an unspecified leg injury, Lyles sat out Kentucky's six-game exhibition series in Nassau, Bahamas from August 10 through August 17. As a freshman, Lyles was named to the 2015 All-SEC Freshman Team and helped lead the Wildcats to a 2015 NCAA Final Four appearance.

On April 9, 2015, Lyles along with Kentucky teammates Andrew Harrison, Aaron Harrison, Dakari Johnson, Devin Booker, Karl-Anthony Towns and Willie Cauley-Stein declared to enter their names into the 2015 NBA draft.

== Professional career ==
=== Utah Jazz (2015–2017) ===
On June 25, 2015, Lyles was selected with the 12th overall pick in the 2015 NBA draft by the Utah Jazz. He signed his rookie scale contract with the Jazz on July 7. Lyles averaged 3.0 points and 3.6 rebounds per game over the first two months of his rookie season. He began picking up his production with more steady minutes during the month of January, scoring in double figures for the first time on January 4 with 13 points against the Houston Rockets. On January 9, in a win over the Miami Heat, he recorded 10 rebounds for the first time, and on January 14, he scored a then season-high 19 points in a loss to the Sacramento Kings. On February 3, he was named a Rising Stars Challenge participant at the 2016 NBA All-Star Weekend, replacing the injured Nikola Mirotić on the World Team roster. On April 10, he scored a career-high 22 points in a 100–84 win over the Denver Nuggets.

=== Denver Nuggets (2017–2019) ===
On June 22, 2017, Lyles was traded, along with the draft rights to Tyler Lydon, to the Denver Nuggets in exchange for the draft rights to Donovan Mitchell. On December 2, 2017, he scored a season-high 18 points in a 115–100 win over the Los Angeles Lakers. On December 10, 2017, he scored a career-high 25 points in a 126–116 overtime loss to the Indiana Pacers. On January 5, 2018, he set a new career high with 26 points in a 99–91 win over the Utah Jazz.

=== San Antonio Spurs (2019–2021) ===
On July 12, 2019, Lyles signed with the San Antonio Spurs. On February 6, 2020, Lyles had a double-double, scoring a season-high 23 points while grabbing 10 rebounds and two steals in a 125–117 loss against the Portland Trail Blazers. On February 29, 2020, Lyles scored 20 points, nine rebounds, two assists, four steals, and one block in a 114–113 win over the Orlando Magic. On March 2, 2020, Lyles got himself 20 points again, along with three rebounds, two assists, and one steal in a 116–111 loss against the Indiana Pacers. On July 15, 2020, Lyles was reported to have undergone an appendectomy and was expected to miss the remainder of the 2019–20 season.

=== Detroit Pistons (2021–2022) ===
On August 6, 2021, Lyles signed a two-year, $5 million contract with the Detroit Pistons.

=== Sacramento Kings (2022–2025) ===
On February 10, 2022, Lyles and Josh Jackson were acquired by the Sacramento Kings in a four-team trade that sent Marvin Bagley III to the Pistons.

On March 13, 2023, during a 133–124 loss to the Milwaukee Bucks, Lyles fouled and shoved Bucks forward Giannis Antetokounmpo, who was taunting Lyles in the last few moments of the game. Bucks center Brook Lopez then confronted Lyles, and the two resulted in a scuffle. Both Lyles and Lopez were ejected from the game. Two days later, the NBA announced that Lyles had been suspended for one game without pay due to his role in the altercation.

=== Real Madrid (2025–2026) ===
On September 10, 2025, Lyles signed a one-year, $3.2 million contract with Real Madrid of the Liga ACB and the EuroLeague; the contract also included an NBA out clause.

On May 24, 2026, despite a 24 point and eight rebound performance from Lyles, Real Madrid lost the EuroLeague Final against Olympiacos by 92–85. On June 23, Lyles left Real Madrid.

=== Minnesota Timberwolves (2026–present) ===
On July 11, 2026, Lyles signed a one–year contract with the Minnesota Timberwolves.

== Career statistics ==
Legend
GP	Games played	GS	Games started	MPG	Minutes per game
FG%	Field goal percentage	3P%	3-point field goal percentage	FT%	Free throw percentage
RPG	Rebounds per game	APG	Assists per game	SPG	Steals per game
BPG	Blocks per game	PPG	Points per game	**Bold**	Career high

=== NBA ===
==== Regular season ====
Year	Team	GP	GS	MPG	FG%	3P%	FT%	RPG	APG	SPG	BPG	PPG
2015–16	Utah	**80**	33	17.3	.438	.383	.695	3.7	.7	.3	.2	6.1
2016–17	Utah	71	4	16.3	.362	.319	.722	3.3	1.0	.4	.3	6.2
2017–18	Denver	73	2	19.1	**.491**	.381	.706	4.8	1.2	.4	**.5**	9.9
2018–19	Denver	64	2	17.5	.418	.255	.698	3.8	**1.4**	**.5**	.4	8.5
2019–20	San Antonio	63	**53**	20.2	.446	**.387**	.733	**5.7**	1.1	.4	.4	6.4
2020–21	San Antonio	23	9	15.6	.478	.350	.652	3.7	.6	.3	.0	5.0
2021–22	Detroit	51	3	19.4	.456	.301	.784	4.8	1.1	.4	**.5**	10.4
2021–22	Sacramento	24	20	**22.8**	.489	.365	**.851**	5.6	1.3	.3	.3	**10.6**
2022–23	Sacramento	74	0	16.9	.458	.363	.815	4.1	.9	.4	.4	7.6
2023–24	Sacramento	58	0	20.0	.445	.384	.700	4.4	1.2	.3	.3	7.2
2024–25	Sacramento	69	5	19.6	.420	.340	.700	4.6	1.2	.6	.3	6.5
Career		650	131	18.4	.441	.347	.741	4.3	1.1	.4	.4	7.6

==== Playoffs ====
Year	Team	GP	GS	MPG	FG%	3P%	FT%	RPG	APG	SPG	BPG	PPG
2017	Utah	2	0	4.8	**.429**	**.333**	—	1.0	.5	**.5**	.0	3.5
2019	Denver	3	0	2.7	.000	.000	—	.3	**.7**	.0	.0	.0
2023	Sacramento	**7**	0	**16.8**	.425	**.333**	.600	**5.7**	**.7**	.3	.0	**6.6**
Career		12	0	11.3	.400	.323	.600	3.6	.7	.3	.0	4.4

=== College ===
Year	Team	GP	GS	MPG	FG%	3P%	FT%	RPG	APG	SPG	BPG	PPG
2014–15	Kentucky	36	21	23.0	.488	.138	.735	5.2	1.1	.5	.4	8.7

== National team career ==
Lyles has represented both Canada and the United States. Until his sophomore year in high school, he had trained in the United States developmental pipeline.

On the international stage, Lyles played for Canada's junior men's national team. During the summer of 2013, Lyles, along with Tyler Ennis, led Canada to a 6th-place finish at the 2013 FIBA Under-19 World Championship with Lyles coming in second to Ennis in scoring at the tournament. He was named to Canada's roster for the 2024 Summer Olympics in Paris.
