= Devin Booker =

American basketball player (born 1996)

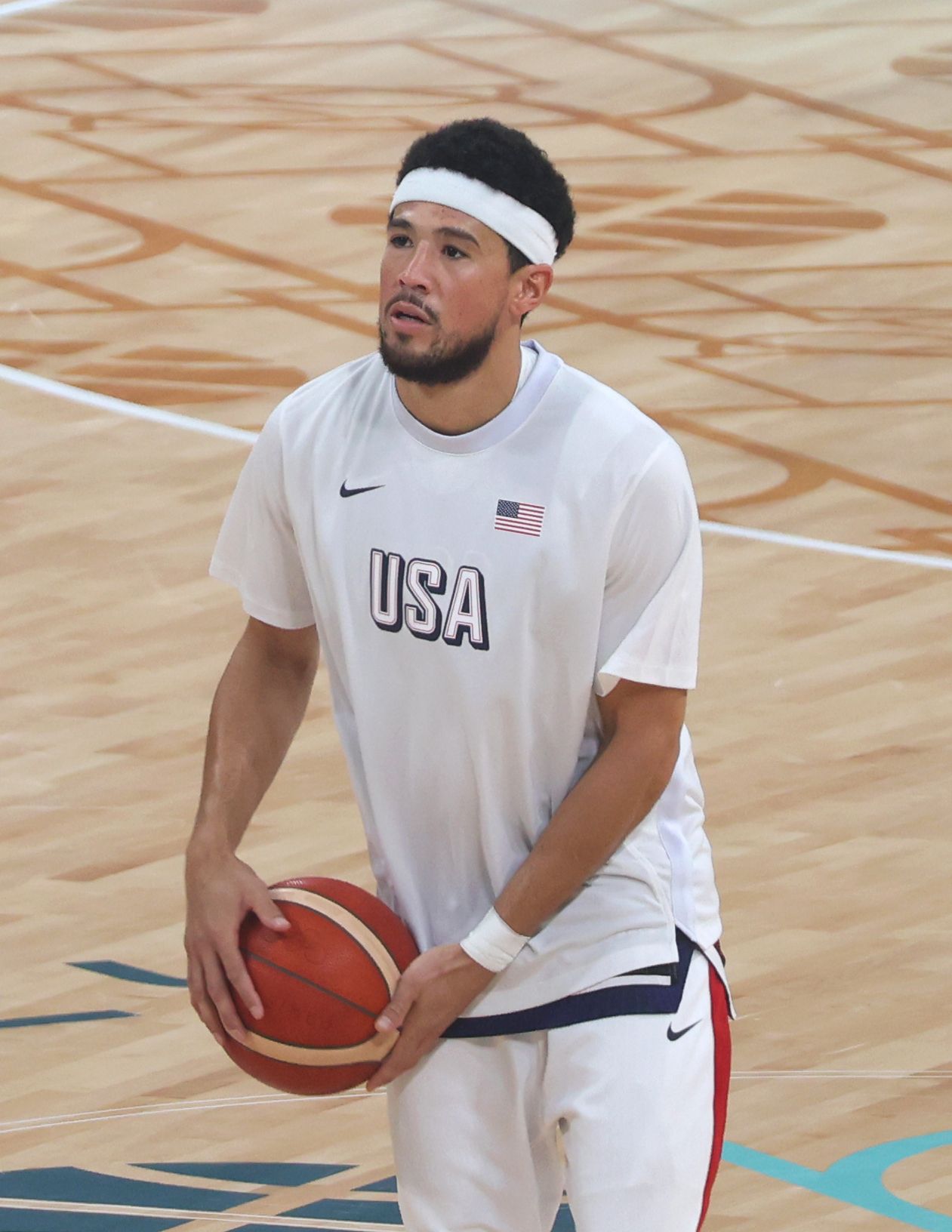
- Booker with Team USA during the 2024 Summer Olympics

No. 15 – Phoenix Suns
- Position: Shooting guard
- League: NBA

Personal information
- Born: October 30, 1996 (age 30) Grand Rapids, Michigan, U.S.
- Listed height: 6 ft 5 in (1.96 m)
- Listed weight: 206 lb (93 kg)

Career information
- High school: Grandville (Grandville, Michigan); Moss Point (Moss Point, Mississippi)
- College: Kentucky (2014–2015)
- NBA draft: 2015: 1st round, 13th overall pick
- Drafted by: Phoenix Suns
- Playing career: 2015–present

Career history
- 2015–present: Phoenix Suns

Career highlights
- 5× NBA All-Star (2020–2022, 2024, 2026); All-NBA First Team (2022); All-NBA Third Team (2024); NBA All-Rookie First Team (2016); NBA Three-Point Contest champion (2018); SEC Sixth Man of the Year (2015); Second-team All-SEC (2015); SEC All-Freshmen Team (2015); McDonald's All-American (2014)
- Stats at NBA.com
- Stats at Basketball Reference
Medals
Men's basketball
Representing the United States
Olympic Games
Gold medal – first place	2020 Tokyo	Team
Gold medal – first place	2024 Paris	Team

Devin Armani Booker (born October 30, 1996) is an American professional basketball player for the Phoenix Suns of the National Basketball Association (NBA). He played one season of college basketball for the Kentucky Wildcats, winning SEC Sixth Man of the Year before being drafted 13th overall by the Suns in the first round of the 2015 NBA draft. Booker is a five-time All-Star, a two-time All-NBA member, and is the Suns' all-time leading scorer. He has also won gold medals with the 2020 and 2024 U.S. Olympic teams.

The son of former basketball player Melvin Booker, Devin debuted with Phoenix at 18 years old and quickly became one of the league’s top scorers. At 20, he became the youngest player to score over 60 points in a game, finishing with a Suns franchise record 70 against the Boston Celtics. At 22 years old, he became the youngest player in NBA history with consecutive 50-point games. Booker helped lead the Suns to the NBA Finals in 2021 and earned All-NBA First Team honors in 2022 after a franchise-best 64-win season. In 2025, at 28, he became the Suns’ all-time leading scorer.

== Early life ==
Booker is the son of Veronica Gutiérrez, a cosmetologist, and Melvin Booker, who was named the 1994 Big Eight Player of the Year while a point guard at Missouri. His parents met while his father was playing basketball for the Continental Basketball Association's Grand Rapids Hoops in Gutiérrez's hometown of Grand Rapids, Michigan.

Booker was born and raised in Grand Rapids, living with his mother, who is of Mexican descent while his African-American father pursued a professional basketball career internationally. Booker spent his summers with his father in Moss Point, Mississippi, and travelled to see him while he played basketball in Italy, Turkey and Russia. At age 12 while visiting his father in Milan, Booker played one-on-one with Danilo Gallinari, then teammate of his father's at Olimpia Milano. Booker was taught by his father that having basketball IQ was just as important as natural athleticism. During his time in middle school, Booker became friends with future fellow NBA players D'Angelo Russell and Tyler Ulis.

== High school career ==
=== Sophomore year ===
After playing for the freshman, junior varsity and varsity basketball teams during his freshman year at Grandville High School in Michigan, Booker moved to Mississippi to live with his father after the latter's retirement from professional basketball. He enrolled at Moss Point High School, where his father was hired as an assistant coach, in August 2011.

In his team's fifth game of the season—a 52–32 loss to Gulfport High School—Booker scored more points (17) than the rest of his teammates combined (15). In December, he hit a buzzer beater from just beyond half court to beat Harrison Central High School, improving Moss Point's record to 4–6 on the year. By early January, Press-Register sportswriter Creg Stephenson opined, "Sophomore guard Devin Booker has developed into one of the top players on the coast in his first season with the [Moss Point] Tigers' varsity, averaging 22.7 points per game."

In the Laurel MLK Shootout, Booker scored 54 points against Northeast Jones High School, falling nine shy of Litterial Green's Moss Point record for most points in a game, set in 1988. He followed up that performance with 32 points, including a game-winning three-pointer, against Murrah High School and was named ESPNHS.com's Southeast Player of the Week. At that time, his father told reporters that Booker was drawing interest from Mississippi State, Ole Miss, Florida, Alabama, Georgetown, Michigan and Missouri.

Booker was limited to just 14 points, with no field goals made in the second half, in a 57–55 win over Gautier High School in the opening round of the Division 7-5A tournament. In the championship game against Pascagoula High School, Booker was held to single-digit scoring (8) for only the second time in the season as Moss Point lost 48–32, setting up an away game with defending state champion Wayne County High School in the first round of the South State playoffs. Wayne County focused their defense on Booker, holding him to a single, first-quarter free throw, en route to a 57–37 victory that ended Moss Point's season. For the year, Booker averaged 22.8 points per game and was named the South Mississippi Player of the Year by the Sun Herald, becoming just the second sophomore to be awarded the honor. In the announcement, the paper reported that Booker held scholarship offers from Ole Miss, Alabama, Georgetown, Michigan and South Alabama.

In the summer following his sophomore year, Booker played in the Nike Elite Youth Basketball League and participated in the Elite 100 Camp, the LeBron James King's Academy Camp, and the Kevin Durant Nike Skills Camp. These commitments caused him to miss the inaugural South Mississippi All-Star Basketball Showcase in May.

=== Junior year ===
With most of Moss Point's experienced players graduating, Booker switched to point guard for his junior year. In an early December game, Booker outscored the entire Ocean Springs High School team 40–39 through three quarters en route to a 48-point finish as Moss Point won 100–55. He followed up this performance with a 30-point outing, including 7 three-pointers, in a win over 54–37 win over Laurel High School in the second annual Melvin Booker Shootout, named in honor of his father. The following week, Booker left a game against Harrison Central High School in the third quarter with a sprained MCL; he had scored just 9 points, but grabbed 7 rebounds.

Booker's injury proved minor, and did not hamper him in Moss Point's next game, where he scored 26 points in a 52–48 loss to Davidson High School in the Jackie Laird Christmas Classic at Biloxi High School. On the second day of the Classic, Booker scored a season-high 49 points in an 80–65 win over Brewbaker Technology Magnet High School, a performance that added Duke to the list of schools recruiting him. In early January, Moss Point went 1–2 in the Poplar Bluff showdown in Poplar Bluff, Missouri, defeating Memphis' Kirby High School but losing to Maplewood Richmond Heights High School and host Poplar Bluff High School. University of Missouri fans attended en masse to cheer for Booker, who averaged 30.2 points over Moss Point's three games, hoping to entice him to play for the Tigers.

Booker scored a game-high 32 points in a 58–56 loss to Gulfport High School, the top-ranked team in Mississippi, in Moss Point's final game before divisional play, dropping the team's record to 6–11. Moss Point went 3–3 in Division 7-5A, finishing the divisional season with a 51–40 victory over Gautier High School. Booker, who struggled with his outside shot due to a wrap on his injured right wrist, hit all 17 of his free throws en route to a game-high 30 points in the win. Moss Point closed out the regular season with a 67–65 loss to Division 5-6A champion Hattiesburg High School, despite 43 points from Booker.

The following week, Moss Point faced a rematch with Gautier in the first round of the Division 7-5A tournament with a spot in the state tournament on the line. Moss Point fell 54–51 in double overtime, ending the team's season at 12–16. Booker scored 35 points in the loss, including 17 free throws. For the year, he averaged 29.7 points, eight rebounds and four assists per game while carrying a 3.81 grade point average. He was named to the Division 7-5A All-Division team and was the division's MVP. In March, he was named the Mississippi Gatorade Player of the Year for 2013, and in April, he became the second player ever to win the Sun Herald Player of the Year Award in consecutive seasons.

By the end of Moss Point's season, Booker held scholarship offers from Duke, North Carolina, Florida, Michigan, Michigan State, Missouri, and Mississippi State. Rivals.com ranked him a four-star prospect and the 30th-best player overall in the class of 2014; ESPN tabbed him as the 18th-best player overall. Recruiting analyst Evan Daniels called Booker "one of the best shooters" in the country. In April, Booker began playing for the Alabama Challenge on the Nike Elite Youth Basketball League circuit. After watching Booker play for the first time in the league's opening weekend, Kentucky coach John Calipari offered Booker a scholarship. At the South Mississippi All-Star event in May, Booker scored 23 points to lead his East team over the West team 101–70 in the underclassman game.

=== Senior year ===
During the summer of 2013, Booker participated in the Kevin Durant Skills Academy, the LeBron James Skills Academy, the CP3 Elite Guard Camp, and the National Basketball Players Association (NBPA) Top 100 camp. His fellow participants in the NBPA camp voted him to the camp's 10-man all-star team. Booker also participated against international competition at the Nike Global Challenge. At the Under Armour Elite 24 showcase, he won the three-point shooting contest. In August 2013, Booker narrowed his list of potential college choices to Florida, Missouri, Michigan, Michigan State, and Kentucky. He took an official visit to the University of Kentucky on the weekend of September 9 to watch an alumni exhibition game; fellow 2014 prospects Jahlil Okafor and Tyler Ulis also attended.

Near the beginning of October, his high school coach said Booker would announce his college choice on October 31 after taking official visits to Michigan and Missouri; he also stated that Booker was no longer considering Florida. Booker stated that ESPN had offered him the chance to make his announcement on live television, but he declined, saying he didn't want the pressure of such an event and that he wanted to keep the date flexible to allow his family from Michigan to attend. At an October 31 ceremony at his high school gymnasium, Booker announced he had chosen Kentucky, citing the program's history and his affinity for coach John Calipari as primary factors in his decision. He, Tyler Ulis, Karl-Anthony Towns and Trey Lyles all signed National Letters of Intent to play for Kentucky on November 13, the first day of the official signing period.

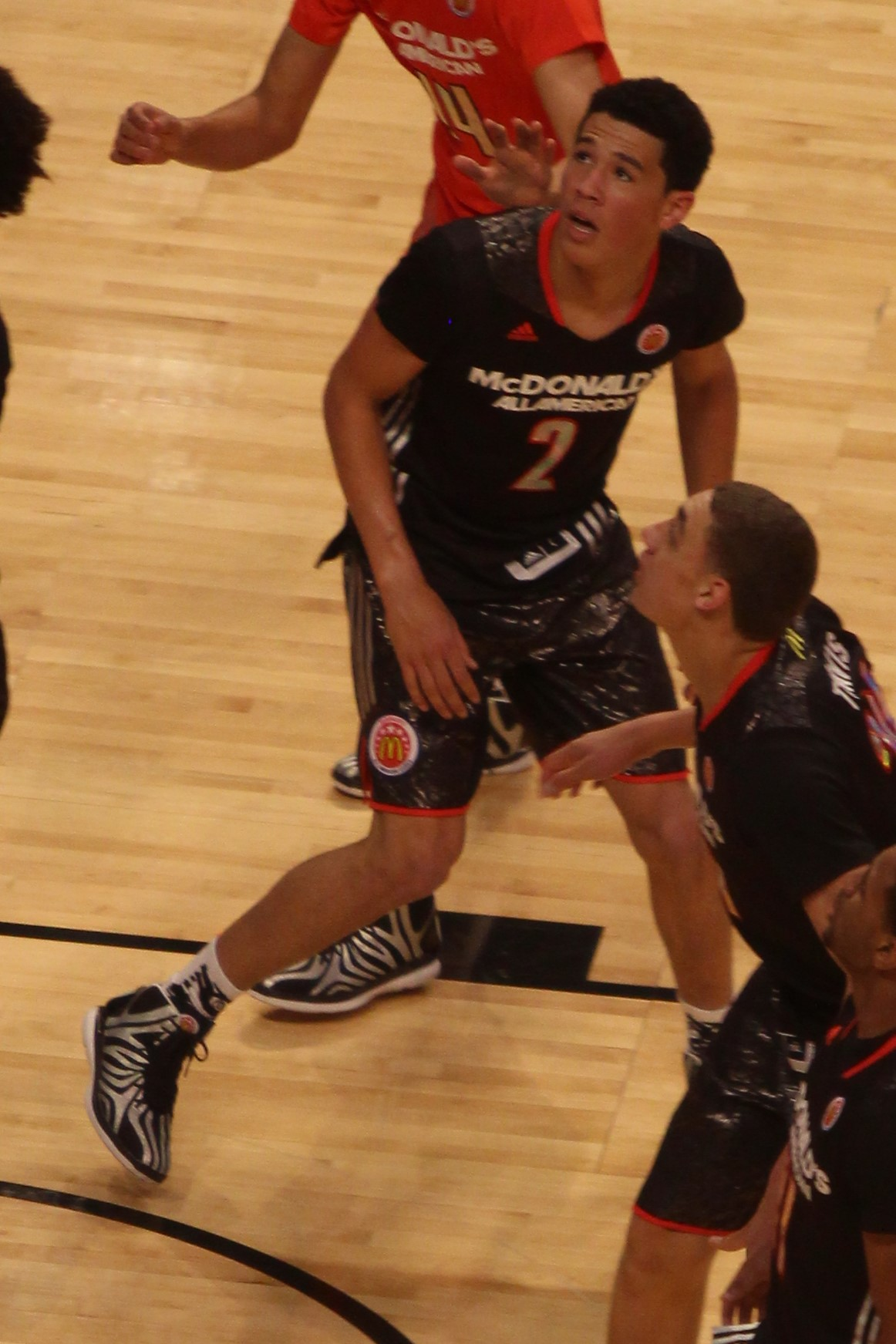
Booker at the 2014 McDonald's All-American Boys Game

In December, Booker's Moss Point team traveled to the Marshall County Hoop Fest in Marshall County, Kentucky, to play Louisville's Ballard High School, the top-rated high school team in the state. Booker led his team in points (40), rebounds (9), and assists (2) while shooting 50% from the field and 20-for-24 from the free throw line, but his team lost the game. Two games later, he scored a season-high 45 points in a 78–67 loss to Alabama's McGill-Toolen Catholic High School in the Melvin Booker Shootout. Although Moss Point lost all three games they played in the late-December HighSchoolOT.com Invitational, Booker's 111 total points over those three games fell just four short of Donald Williams' 1991 record for the event.

Booker's 38-point performance in a January 31 win against Pass Christian High School made him Moss Point's all-time career scoring leader with 2,263 points, surpassing the 2006 mark of 2,251 set by David Booker (no relation). Moss Point won Mississippi's Region 8-4A regular season and tournament championships before ending their season with a 61–56 loss to McComb High School in the Class 4A South State Finals. Booker scored 42 points in the loss, including 26 in the fourth quarter. He averaged 30.9 points per game in his senior season and finished his three-year career at Moss Point with 2,518 points. After the season, he was named to the USA Today All-USA third team.

In the 2014 Alabama-Mississippi All-Star game, Booker had a game-high 31 points and was named MVP of the Mississippi team, but his team lost to the Alabama team 90–83. Booker's 31 points tied Othella Harrington's 1992 performance for the most ever scored by a Mississippi player in the event. Booker joined future Kentucky teammates Ulis and Lyles on the West team in the 2014 McDonald's All-American Game, while Towns suited up for the East. He scored a three-point basket in each half and finished with 8 points as the West won 105–102. In March, all four were selected for the Jordan Brand Classic, with Booker and Ulis on the West team and Towns and Lyles playing for the East. In May, Booker participated in the South Mississippi All-Star Basketball Showcase leading the Home team with 43 points, including a three-pointer to send the game into overtime, in a 114–106 win against the Away team. He was named the game's MVP.

College recruiting
Name	Hometown	School	Height	Weight	Commit date
Devin Booker; G	Moss Point, MS	Moss Point	6 ft 6 in (1.98 m)	185 lb (84 kg)	Oct 31, 2013
Devin Booker; G	Recruit ratings: Scout: Rivals: 247Sports: ESPN: (93)				
Overall recruit ranking: Scout: 28, 6 (SG) Rivals: 29 ESPN: 18, 1 (MS), 3 (SG)
Note: In many cases, Scout, Rivals, 247Sports, On3, and ESPN may conflict in their listings of height and weight.; In these cases, the average was taken. ESPN grades are on a 100-point scale.; Sources: "Kentucky 2014 Basketball Commitments". Rivals.; "2014 Kentucky Basketball Commits". Scout.; "ESPN". ESPN.; "Scout.com Team Recruiting Rankings". Scout.; "2014 Team Ranking". Rivals.

== College career ==
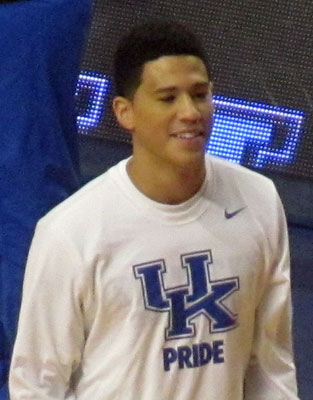
Booker in October 2014

In Kentucky's first exhibition game against the University of Pikeville on November 2, 2014, Booker was the team's second leading scorer with 16 points on 6-of-9 shooting, including two three-pointers; he also had three assists.

After a standout 15-point, 6-rebound, 7-assist game against Boston University, Booker posted a then-season-high 18 points in a November 23 win against Montana State. He led the team in scoring, shooting 6-of-8 from the field with 3 three-pointers. In Kentucky's next game against Texas-Arlington, Booker set a new season high with a team-high 19 points on 7-of-8 shooting, including five made three-pointers, in a 92–44 win.

In 38 games for Kentucky in 2014–15, Booker averaged 10.0 points, 2.0 rebounds, and 1.1 assists in 21.5 minutes per game. He subsequently earned SEC Sixth Man of the Year honors and was named to the SEC All-Freshman Team and the All-SEC Second Team.

On April 9, 2015, Booker declared for the NBA draft, forgoing his final three years of college eligibility. He was joined by fellow Kentucky teammates Andrew Harrison, Aaron Harrison, Dakari Johnson, Willie Cauley-Stein, Trey Lyles, and Karl-Anthony Towns.

== Professional career ==
=== Phoenix Suns (2015–present) ===
On June 25, 2015, Booker was selected as the thirteenth overall pick by the Phoenix Suns in the 2015 NBA draft.

==== 2015–16 season: All-Rookie honors ====
On July 13, Booker signed his rookie-scale contract with the Suns, and in seven subsequent Summer League games, he averaged 15.3 points, 4.9 rebounds, and 1.7 assists per game. He went on to make his NBA debut two days before his 19th birthday, in the Suns' season opener against the Dallas Mavericks. In 21 minutes of action against the Mavericks, he scored 14 points on 6-of-7 shooting in a 111–95 loss.

"We thought he had a lot of potential. We loved his character and work ethic, his size and his shooting ability stood out. I think sometimes when you're on a team with a lot of talent like Devin was at Kentucky, all that talent can do one of two things: it can mask some of your deficiencies if you do lack in some areas. I think in Devin's case, it was the opposite of that."

— Ryan McDonough, Suns GM

On January 2, 2016, Booker scored a then season-high 21 points in a 142–119 loss to the Sacramento Kings. On January 19, he scored 32 points in a 97–94 loss to the Indiana Pacers, setting a Suns' rookie record with six three-pointers. Booker became the third-youngest player in NBA history at 19 years, 81 days old to record a 30-point game, behind LeBron James and Kevin Durant, as well as the youngest Suns player to score 30 or more points in a game. Booker participated for Team USA in the 2016 Rising Stars Challenge. He also competed in the NBA All-Star Weekend's Three-Point Contest, becoming the youngest contestant ever to participate in the event and only the fourth rookie to compete in the 30-year-old contest, joining Stephen Curry (2010), Kyle Korver (2004) and Dennis Scott (1991). He made it to the final round of the event, where he finished third behind the "Splash Brothers" – Curry and Klay Thompson (winner).

On March 3, Booker scored a then-career-high 34 points in a loss to the Miami Heat, On March 10, Booker recorded a career-high 35 points in a loss to the Denver Nuggets. Throughout the month of March, Booker led all rookies in points (22.4) and assists (4.9) per game. On April 9, with 16 points scored in a 121–100 win over the New Orleans Pelicans, Booker reached 1,014 for the season, making him the fourth-youngest player to reach 1,000 career points, following only LeBron James, Kevin Durant, and Kobe Bryant, as well as the third-youngest during their rookie season. Booker finished fourth in the 2016 NBA Rookie of the Year Award voting and earned NBA All-Rookie First Team honors. He became the first Suns player to be named as a member of the All-Rookie Team since Amar'e Stoudemire in 2003.

==== 2016–17 season: Improving as a sophomore ====
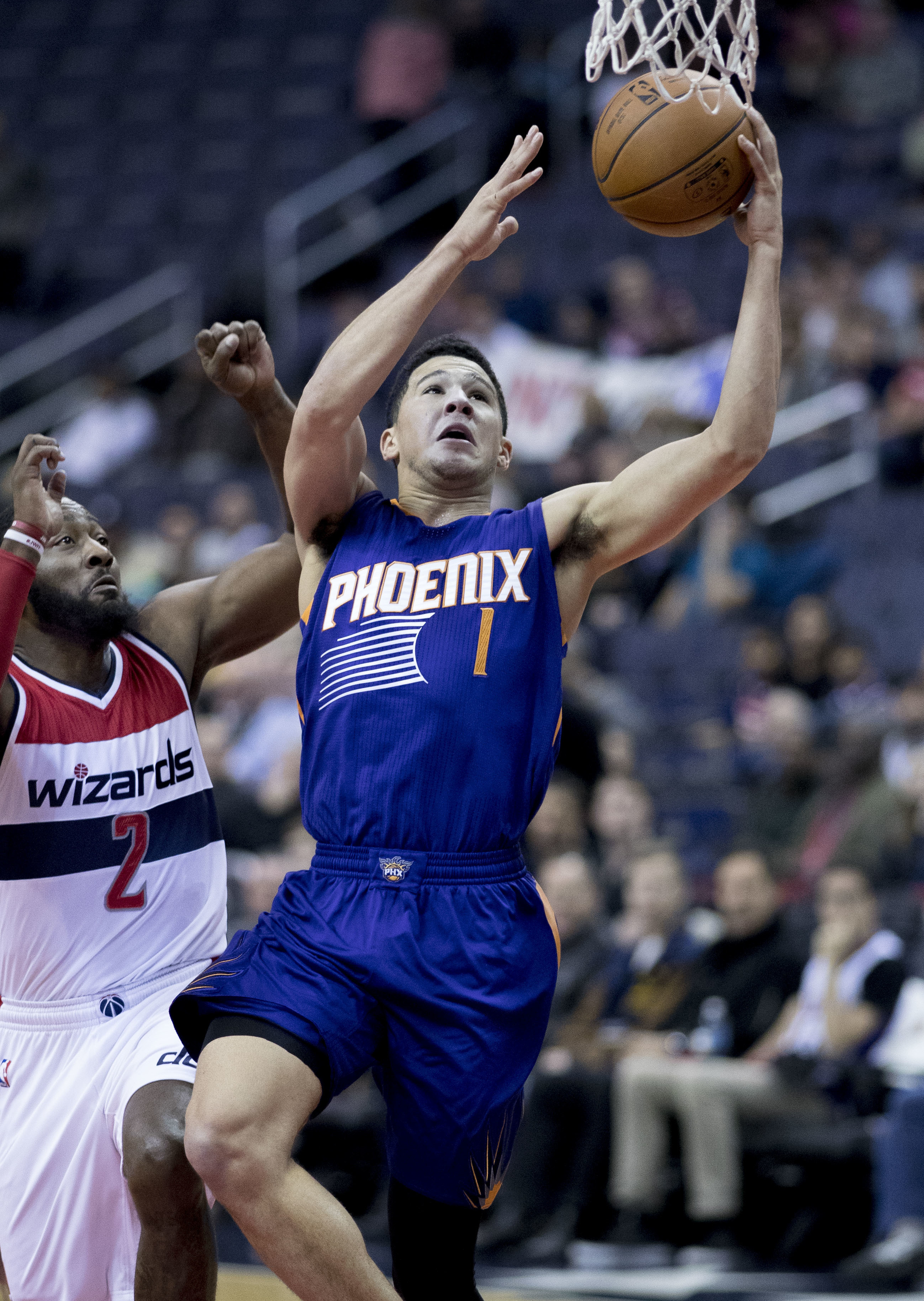
Booker in November 2016

During the offseason, Booker trained with head coach Earl Watson and former NBA player Baron Davis at UCLA, was invited to be on the select team that practices against Team USA in preparation for the Summer Olympics, and played two games for the Suns during the Las Vegas Summer League. With teammate Eric Bledsoe returning from injury in 2016–17, Booker was retained as the starting shooting guard while Brandon Knight was moved to the bench. Booker scored career highs of 38 points and 39 points on November 4 and 6.

On January 12, 2017, he scored 28 fourth-quarter points, in another 39-point night, to set the Suns franchise record for most points in a quarter, previously held by Stephon Marbury's 26 points in 2002. He had a second straight 39-point effort in a two days later to become the youngest player in NBA history to record consecutive games of 39 or more points in the regular season. He was named to the U.S. Team for the 2017 Rising Stars Challenge, and was invited to take part in the 2017 Taco Bell Skills Challenge. On February 4, at 20 years, 97 days old, Booker became the youngest player to score at least 20 points in 16 consecutive games. His 16-game streak is the second-longest by any first-year or second-year player since Vince Carter had a 23-game run as a second-year player during the 1999–2000 season.

"What strikes a lot of people about Devin is all the other stuff he can do – he's really developed his ball handling, his pick and roll game, he thinks the game at a high level. But I'll be honest, we had no idea he'd be able to do this much, this quickly. Devin has done unbelievably well not just on the court but representing the franchise in the community as well. He was a bright spot for us in a difficult year."

— Ryan McDonough, Suns general manager

On March 24 against the Boston Celtics, Booker became the sixth player in NBA history to score 70 points in a game, joining Wilt Chamberlain, David Robinson, David Thompson, Elgin Baylor and Kobe Bryant. It was the 11th 70-point game in NBA history. Booker also added eight rebounds and six assists in 45 minutes. Booker, at age 20, became the youngest player to score 70 (and 60) points in a game. He had the highest-scoring game in the NBA since Bryant scored 81 in January 2006. The Suns' previous scoring record was held by Tom Chambers with 60 points on March 24, 1990. Booker ended the season averaging 22.1 points per game, a near 9-point increment from his 13.8 points in 2015–16.

==== 2017–18 season: Injuries ====
On November 6, 2017, Booker scored 18 points in a 98–92 loss to the Brooklyn Nets to reach 3,000 career points and the fourth-youngest player in NBA history to score 3,000 points, behind LeBron James, Kevin Durant, and Carmelo Anthony. On November 13, a 36-point game and 26th 30-point in his career tied Steve Nash for 15th most in franchise history. Over the Suns' first 17 games of the season, Booker had seven 30-point games. On December 4, Booker scored a season-high 46 points in a 115–101 win over the Philadelphia 76ers.

On December 6, he was ruled out for up to three weeks after sustaining a left adductor strain the previous night against the Toronto Raptors. On December 26, in a 99–97 win over the Memphis Grizzlies, Booker scored 32 points in his return. Booker then missed four games in early February with a left hip contusion. On February 17, Booker won the Three-Point Contest over Klay Thompson and Tobias Harris in the final round after setting a new record with 28 points.

On March 2, in a 124–116 loss to the Oklahoma City Thunder, Booker scored 39 points and at 21 years, 123 days old, he became the third-youngest player in NBA history to reach 4,000 career points, again behind LeBron James and Kevin Durant. Booker missed the Suns' final 12 games of the season with a right hand sprain.

==== 2018–19 season: Franchise player ====
On July 7, 2018, Booker signed a five-year, $158 million maximum contract extension with the Suns.

On September 10, he was ruled out for six weeks after undergoing surgery to repair the fifth metacarpophalangeal joint in his right hand after he jammed it in practice on March 14, 2018. He recovered in time for the Suns' season opener on October 17, scoring 35 points in a 121–100 victory over the Dallas Mavericks. Throughout the beginning of the season, he had multiple 30-plus-point games despite missing a six-game stretch when he strained his hamstring. On January 24, Booker became the fifth-youngest player in NBA history to reach 5,000 career points, behind LeBron James, Kevin Durant, Carmelo Anthony, and Dwight Howard.

On February 25, he scored 20 points to help the Suns break a franchise-record 17-game losing streak with a 124–121 win over the Miami Heat. On March 25, he scored 59 points in a 125–92 loss to the Utah Jazz. On March 27, he scored 50 points in a 124–121 loss to the Wizards, becoming the youngest player in NBA history with consecutive 50-point games. He also became the first player in franchise history to reach 50 in back-to-back games. On April 3, in a 118–97 loss to the Jazz, Booker sprained his left ankle, ruling him out for the last three games of the season.

==== 2019–20 season: First All-Star season ====
On November 23, 2019, Booker nearly put up a triple-double with 35 points, a career-high 12 rebounds, and 9 assists in a 100–98 win over the Minnesota Timberwolves. From December 27, 2019, until January 7, 2020, Booker scored over 30 points in seven straight games, including a 40-point performance in a loss against the Memphis Grizzlies on January 5. This streak broke a franchise record for most consecutive 30-plus-point games in a row, beating a record previously set by Charlie Scott twice and Charles Barkley once. In addition, his streak from December 28 until January 7 made him the only player since the 1983–84 NBA season to record six straight performances of 30-plus points and 6-plus assists with 47% shooting efficiency. On January 28, Booker became the fourth-youngest player to reach 7,000 career points, behind only LeBron James, Kevin Durant, and Carmelo Anthony. Booker was named an All-Star on February 13, 2020, as an injury replacement after Damian Lillard suffered an groin strain injury a day earlier. He also replaced Lillard in the Three Point Contest, an event he had previously won, and finished as the runner-up behind Buddy Hield.

In the 2020 NBA Bubble, Booker helped the Suns reached an 8–0 record as of August 11, 2020, holding an 8-game winning streak for the first time since the 2009–10 season. On August 4, Booker hit a fade-away game-winning jumper at the buzzer over Paul George and Kawhi Leonard to lift the Suns to a 117–115 win over the Los Angeles Clippers and bring their record there to 3–0 at the time. On August 11, he scored 35 points, breaking a franchise record set by Walter Davis for the most games of 30-plus points scored with the team, as well as get 9 rebounds and 7 assists in a 130–117 win over the Philadelphia 76ers. During his time in the NBA Bubble, Booker was named a nominee for the Seeding Games MVP award (earned for the best overall performance in the NBA's resumed regular season games), as well as earned a spot for one of the All-Seeding Games Teams, averaging 31 points per game during these games.

==== 2020–21 season: First playoff appearance and NBA Finals ====
On January 22, 2021, Booker reached 8,000 points scored in a 130–126 overtime loss to the Denver Nuggets, straining his left hamstring during that overtime. He returned to action on February 1, reaching 700 career three-point shots, including a game-winning 3-pointer with 1.5 seconds left in the game, to win 109–108 over the Dallas Mavericks. Two days later, Booker passed Dan Majerle for 10th place in the Suns all-time scoring list in a 123–101 loss to the New Orleans Pelicans. On February 8, 2021, Booker scored a season-high 36 points in a 119–113 win over the Cleveland Cavaliers. He later matched his season high for points on February 13 in a 120–111 win over the Philadelphia 76ers. Booker was then named the Western Conference Player of the Week for the first time in his career on February 15 for the week of February 8–14, 2021, becoming the first Suns player to get the award since Goran Dragić in 2014. On February 24, for the second year in a row, Booker was named an All-Star as an injury replacement, this time to Anthony Davis. He and Chris Paul became the first Suns duo since Steve Nash and Amar'e Stoudemire in 2010 to be named All-Stars. The duo would also help Phoenix clinch their first playoff berth since 2010.

On May 23, Booker would make his NBA playoff debut, posting 34 points, 7 rebounds and 8 assists in a 99–90 victory in Game 1 of the First Round over the defending champion Los Angeles Lakers. On June 3, Booker recorded a playoff career-high 47 points, along with 11 rebounds to lead the Suns to a 113–100 series-clinching victory over the Lakers in Game 6 to advance to the Conference Semifinals against the Denver Nuggets. In Game 4 against the Denver Nuggets in the Conference Semifinals, Booker dropped 34 points and 11 rebounds in a 125–118 victory, leading the Suns to a 4–0 series sweep over the Nuggets for their first Western Conference Finals appearance since 2010. In Game 1 of the Conference Finals, Booker recorded his first career triple-double with 40 points, 13 rebounds, and 11 assists, in a 120–114 win over the Los Angeles Clippers. In Game 6 of the Conference Finals, Booker dropped 22 points in a 130–103 victory over the Clippers, to lead the Suns to the NBA Finals for the first time since 1993.

In Game 1 of the 2021 NBA Finals against the Milwaukee Bucks, Booker put up 27 points in a 118–105 win. In Game 2 of the 2021 NBA Finals, Booker put up 31 points, shooting 7-for-12 from three-point range, in a 118–108 win, as Phoenix took a 2–0 series lead. On July 14, Booker broke Rick Barry's 54-year-old record of most points in first NBA playoff appearance with 601. Despite the success, the Suns would lose to the Bucks in six games. Booker in his first career playoffs averaged 27.3 points, 5.6 rebounds, and 4.5 assists, with 45/32/91% shooting, and back-to-back 40-point games in the Finals becoming the third player in NBA history to have back-to-back 40 point games in the Finals.

==== 2021–22 season: Franchise record in wins and All-NBA honors ====
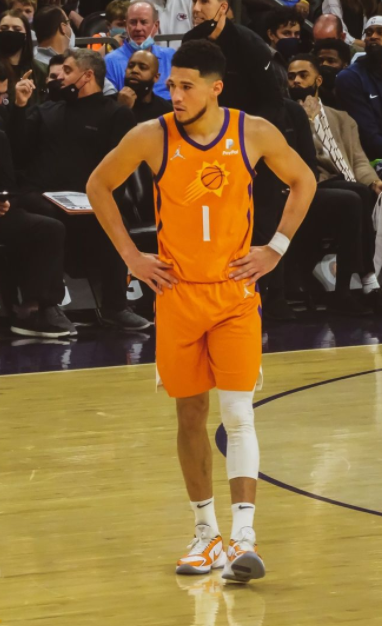
Booker in April 2022

During the 2021–22 NBA season, on November 29, 2021, Booker was named the Player of the Week in the Western Conference for his performance during Week 6 of the season, which helped the Suns achieve a franchise-record 18-game winning streak. He received the honor again on January 17, 2022, for his efforts during Week 13. Booker was named an All-Star along with teammate for the third year in a row alongside teammate Chris Paul when reserves were announced on February 10. That night, he was selected for Team Durant as part of the All-Star Draft. On March 24, 2022, Booker scored a season-high 49 points in a 140–130 road victory over the Denver Nuggets, becoming the fourth-youngest player in NBA history to score 11,000 points. He finished the week averaging 37.3 points and 6.3 assists per game and was named the Week 23 Western Conference Player of the Week. Booker and the Suns finished the regular season with the league's best overall record at 64–18. Booker was also named to the All-NBA First Team, the first in his career.

Booker began the postseason in good form, scoring 56 points during the first two games of the Suns' first-round series against the 8-seeded New Orleans Pelicans, but left Game 2 in the third quarter after suffering what would be diagnosed as a grade 1 hamstring injury. After missing the next three games, Booker returned in the Suns' 115–109 Game 6 road win that clinched the series and an appearance in the Western Conference Semifinals for Phoenix. In the Western Conference Semifinals, the Suns jumped to a 2–0 lead in the series against the Dallas Mavericks before losing in seven games.

==== 2022–23 season: Contract extension ====
On July 7, 2022, Booker agreed to a four-year, $224 million maximum contract extension with the Suns; the same day, he was announced as one of the cover stars of NBA 2K23. On November 18, Booker scored 49 points alongside eight rebounds and 10 assists in a 134–133 loss to the Utah Jazz. On November 30, Booker scored a then season-high 51 points in just three quarters on 20-of-25 shooting from the field in a 132–113 win over the Chicago Bulls. He was named Western Conference Player of the Month, averaging 29.0 points per game, 5.3 rebounds per game, and 5.8 assists per game in October and November. On December 17, Booker scored a season-high 58 points in a 118–114 win over the New Orleans Pelicans. He became the sixth-youngest player to reach 12,000 career points trailing only LeBron James, Kevin Durant, Kobe Bryant, Carmelo Anthony, and Tracy McGrady.

On February 7, 2023, Booker returned to the lineup after missing the previous 21 games with a left groin strain. He had 19 points, six assists and four rebounds in a 116–112 win over the Brooklyn Nets. On February 24, Booker put up 25 points, six rebounds, and eight assists in a 124–115 win over the Oklahoma City Thunder. He also made his 1,052nd career three-pointer, surpassing Steve Nash for the most three-pointers made in Suns history. On March 5 against the Dallas Mavericks, Booker scored 36 points on 15-of-25 shooting to go along with five rebounds and 10 assists, lifting the Suns to a 130–126 win. Booker also got into an altercation with Luka Dončić with 3.5 seconds remaining in the game, as they ended up nose-to-nose and were both issued technical fouls. On March 8, Booker scored 44 points on 17-of-23 shooting from the field, including 6-of-10 from the three-point range in a 132–101 win over the Oklahoma City Thunder. He also became the first player in Suns history to have four straight games with at least 35 points.

In Game 3 of the Suns’ first round playoff series against the Los Angeles Clippers, Booker scored 45 points in a 129–124 win, to lead Phoenix to a 2–1 series lead. He tied Charles Barkley's franchise record for most 40-point playoff games with five. In Game 5 of the Suns’ first round playoff series against the Los Angeles Clippers, Booker put up 47 points, 10 assists, and eight rebounds in a 136–130 win. He also put up his 17th 30-point playoff game and his sixth 40-point playoff game, surpassing Charles Barkley’s previous Suns franchise records of 30-point playoff games (16) and 40-point playoff games (5). In Game 3 of the Western Conference Semifinals, Booker tied a playoff career-high 47 points and put up six rebounds, nine assists and three steals in a 121–114 win against the Denver Nuggets. The Suns ultimately lost the series to the eventual NBA champion Nuggets in six games. However, throughout Denver's entire championship run, Phoenix was the only team to win more than one game against the Nuggets in a single playoff series.

==== 2023–24 season: Fourth All-Star selection ====
On November 17, 2023, Booker recorded 24 points and a career-high 15 assists in a 131–128 win over the Utah Jazz. On November 24, Booker scored 40 points on 15 of 21 shooting from the field, including 3 of 4 from outside the arc in a 110–89 win over the Memphis Grizzlies. On November 26, Booker put up 28 points, 11 assists, two blocks, and a game-winning three-pointer in a 116–113 win over the New York Knicks.

On January 19, 2024, Booker put up 52 points, with 25 of those coming in the first quarter, in a 123–109 win over the New Orleans Pelicans. On January 24, Booker scored 46 points on 17-of-23 shooting from the field, including 6-of-10 from the three-point range in a 132–109 win over the Dallas Mavericks. Two days later against the Indiana Pacers, Booker had 29 points in the first quarter, setting a Suns franchise record for points in a quarter. He finished the game with 62 points on 22-of-37 shooting in a 133–131 loss, becoming the ninth player in NBA history to record multiple 60-plus-point games. Booker also set the record for most points in a game in the Gainbridge Fieldhouse, marking his fourth different arena where he's set the single-game scoring record, joining the Footprint Center, TD Garden, and Vivint Arena. After another 44-point outing against the Orlando Magic on January 28, Booker was named the Western Conference Player of the Week for the ninth time in his career, averaging 42 points, five rebounds, and 63.9% from the field in four games. He was also named Western Conference Player of the Month for the third time in his career, the most in Suns franchise history. In 16 games in January, Booker averaged 30.0 points, 6.3 assists, and 4.4 rebounds, while shooting 53.9% from the floor and 40.0% from three-point range, with the Suns going 11–5 during that stretch.

On February 1, Booker was named to his fourth All-Star Game as a Western Conference reserve. On April 1, Booker recorded 52 points, nine assists and a career-high eight three-pointers in a 124–111 win over the New Orleans Pelicans. He became the first NBA player since Wilt Chamberlain to score at least 50 points in three consecutive games against the same opponent. In the first round of the playoffs, Phoenix would go on to lose to the Minnesota Timberwolves in four games despite Booker's playoff career-high 49 points in the 122–116 close-out loss in game 4. At the conclusion of the season, Booker was named to the All-NBA Third Team. Alongside Kevin Durant, they became the third pair of teammates in NBA history to each average 27-plus points in the same season.

==== 2024–25 season: All-time franchise scorer ====
On February 3, 2025, Booker surpassed Walter Davis for the most career points in Suns franchise history. On February 7, Booker scored a season-high 47 points along with 6 rebounds and 11 assists in 135–127 overtime win Utah Jazz. He started 75 games for Phoenix during the 2024–25 NBA season, averaging 25.6 points, 4.1 rebounds, and a career-high 7.1 assists.

==== 2025–26 season: Fifth All-Star selection ====
On July 9, 2025, Booker and the Suns agreed to a two-year max extension worth $145 million.

On December 2, Booker reached 17,000 career points in a 125–108 win over the Los Angeles Lakers, scoring 11 points in 10 minutes before leaving in the first half due to a groin injury. On January 4, 2026, Booker posted 24 points, six rebounds, and nine assists, sealing a 108–105 win over the Oklahoma City Thunder with a game-winning three-pointer. On February 1, 2026, Booker was named to his fifth All-Star Game as a Western Conference reserve. On March 12, Booker scored a season-high 43 points, along with seven rebounds and five assists, to lead the Suns to a 123–108 win over the Indiana Pacers.

==== 2026–27 season: Jersey number change ====
Before the 2026–27 season, Booker changed his jersey number from 1 to 15 to honor his father who wore the number during his career.

== National team career ==
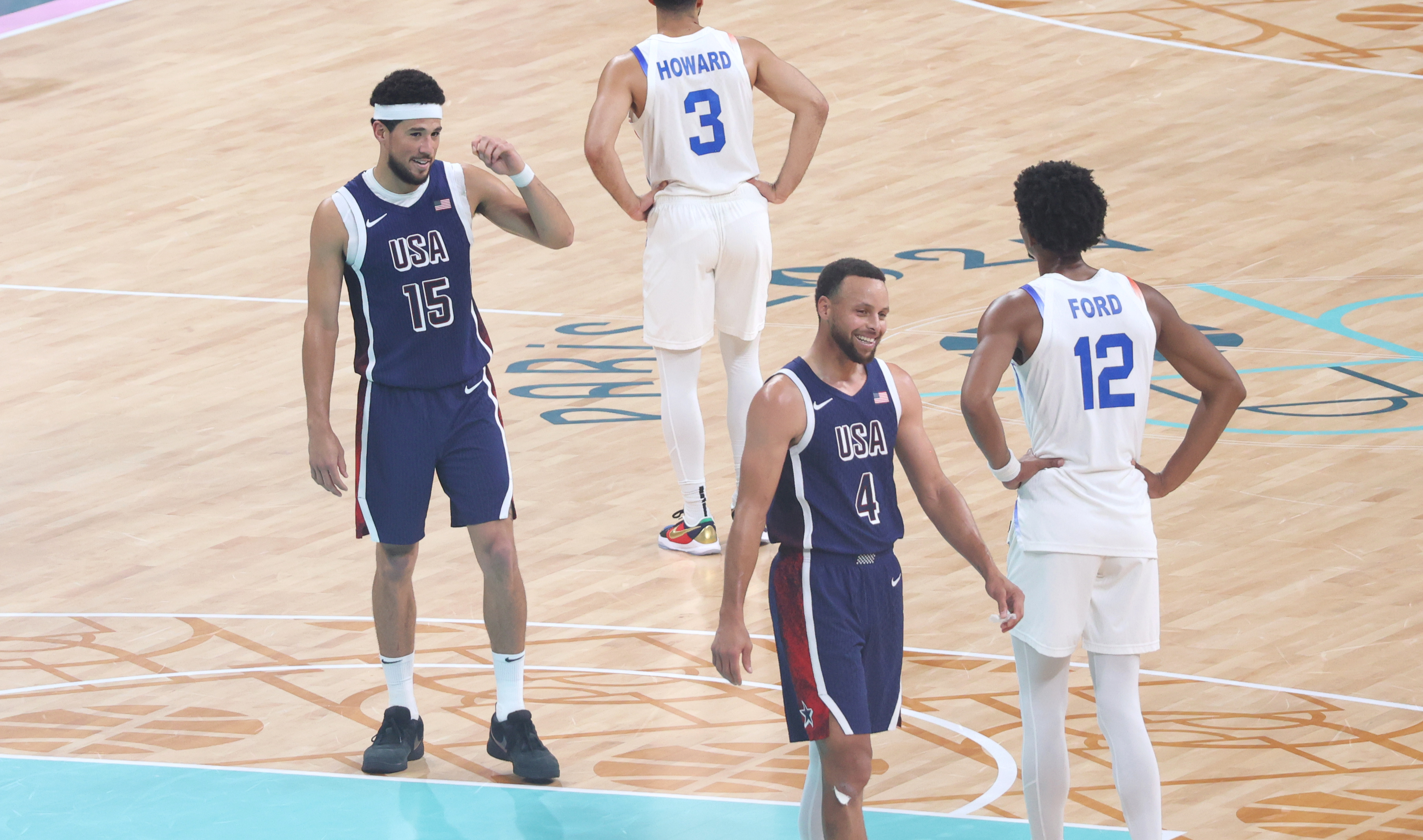
Booker with his U.S. national team teammmate Stephen Curry in the 2024 Summer Olympics

Due to his mother's ethnic background, Booker drew interest from the Mexican and U.S. national teams. He played on the 2016 USA Select Team that trained against the 2016 U.S. Olympic team. In February 2020, he was named a finalist to play on the 2020 Olympic team. However, the 2020 Summer Olympics were postponed into 2021 due to the COVID-19 pandemic. In 2021, Booker and Team USA won the Olympic gold medal in men's basketball. He was named to the 2024 Olympic team for the 2024 Paris Olympics. He played a crucial role on Team USA leading up to their gold medal win on August 10, with head coach Steve Kerr calling Booker their "unsung MVP" throughout their run.

== Career statistics ==
Legend
GP	Games played	GS	Games started	MPG	Minutes per game
FG%	Field goal percentage	3P%	3-point field goal percentage	FT%	Free throw percentage
RPG	Rebounds per game	APG	Assists per game	SPG	Steals per game
BPG	Blocks per game	PPG	Points per game	**Bold**	Career high

=== NBA ===
==== Regular season ====
Year	Team	GP	GS	MPG	FG%	3P%	FT%	RPG	APG	SPG	BPG	PPG
2015–16	Phoenix	76	51	27.7	.423	.343	.840	2.5	2.6	.6	.3	13.8
2016–17	Phoenix	**78**	**78**	35.0	.423	.363	.832	3.2	3.4	.9	.3	22.1
2017–18	Phoenix	54	54	34.5	.432	**.383**	.878	4.5	4.7	.9	.3	24.9
2018–19	Phoenix	64	64	35.0	.467	.326	.866	4.1	6.8	.9	.2	26.6
2019–20	Phoenix	70	70	35.9	.489	.354	**.919**	4.2	6.5	.7	.3	26.6
2020–21	Phoenix	67	67	33.9	.484	.340	.867	4.2	4.3	.8	.2	25.6
2021–22	Phoenix	68	68	34.5	.466	**.383**	.868	**5.0**	4.8	**1.1**	**.4**	26.8
2022–23	Phoenix	53	53	34.6	**.494**	.351	.855	4.5	5.5	1.0	.3	**27.8**
2023–24	Phoenix	68	68	36.0	.492	.364	.886	4.5	6.9	.9	**.4**	27.1
2024–25	Phoenix	75	75	**37.3**	.461	.332	.894	4.1	**7.1**	.9	.2	25.6
2025–26	Phoenix	64	64	33.5	.456	.330	.873	3.9	6.0	.8	.3	26.1
Career		737	712	34.3	.463	.352	.873	4.0	5.3	.9	.3	24.6
All-Star		4	0	24.1	.453	.200	—	5.5	4.3	1.5	.3	13.3

==== Playoffs ====
Year	Team	GP	GS	MPG	FG%	3P%	FT%	RPG	APG	SPG	BPG	PPG
2021	Phoenix	**22**	**22**	40.4	.447	.321	.905	**5.6**	4.5	.8	.2	27.3
2022	Phoenix	10	10	36.6	.451	.431	.887	4.8	4.4	.5	.4	23.3
2023	Phoenix	11	11	**41.7**	**.585**	**.508**	.866	4.8	**7.2**	1.7	**.8**	**33.7**
2024	Phoenix	4	4	41.5	.492	.350	**.951**	3.3	6.0	**1.8**	.3	27.5
2026	Phoenix	4	4	38.3	.460	.250	.786	4.3	4.8	.3	.3	21.3
Career		51	51	39.9	.484	.380	.890	5.0	5.2	1.0	.4	27.5

=== College ===
Year	Team	GP	GS	MPG	FG%	3P%	FT%	RPG	APG	SPG	BPG	PPG
2014–15	Kentucky	38	0	21.5	.470	.411	.828	2.0	1.1	.4	.1	10.0

== Personal life ==
In 2020, Booker was named a global ambassador to the Special Olympics for his support for his younger half-sister who has microdeletion syndrome, a genetic chromosomal disorder.

From June 2020 to October 2022, Booker was in a relationship with Kendall Jenner, a member of the Kardashian family.

A Michigan native, Booker is a Detroit sports fan, frequently sporting attire from the Detroit Red Wings and Detroit Lions.

Booker has his own charitable foundation called the Starting Five, which grants five nonprofit organizations $100,000 each, and planned to donate $500,000 to Phoenix charities per year for 5 years as of 2020.

In 2019, Booker bought a 5,590 sq ft (519 m^{2}) house in Paradise Valley, Arizona, for $3.5 million.

Call of Duty: Modern Warfare III added Booker as a playable operator for Warzone. The pack was released on May 3, 2024, and is titled "Tracer Pack: D Book Was Here bundle".

== See also ==
- List of NBA franchise career scoring leaders
- List of NBA single-game scoring leaders
- List of NBA career free throw percentage leaders
- List of oldest and youngest NBA players
- List of second-generation NBA players
- NBA regular season records
