= 2020 United States men's Olympic basketball team =

- Head coach: Gregg Popovich
- Scoring leader: Kevin Durant 20.7
- Rebounding leader: Bam Adebayo 5.7
- Assists leader: Jrue Holiday 3.8
- Biggest win: 54 vs. Iran
- Biggest defeat: 7 vs. France
Home	Away

The men's national basketball team of the United States won the gold medal at the 2020 Summer Olympics in Tokyo, Japan. The Olympics were delayed a year until 2021 because of the COVID-19 pandemic. It was the fourth consecutive Olympic gold medal for the Americans. Kevin Durant was named the FIBA Men's Olympics Most Valuable Player (MVP)

Team USA qualified for the Olympics by finishing as one of the top two teams from the Americas at the FIBA Basketball World Cup in 2019. The U.S. saw two Olympic gold medal winners in Durant (2012, 2016) and Draymond Green (2016) return, while 10 other players made their Olympic debuts. Unlike the 2019 World Cup team that finished in seventh place with a team of traditional centers and limited shooting, the Olympic team featured multi-positional players and adept shooters. After the disappointing World Cup, in which only four of the initial 35 candidates were on the final roster, star players began openly expressing an interest in joining the Olympic team. While other countries had a core roster that has played together for years in multiple international tournaments, the U.S. team changed every year.

Complicating the decision for National Basketball Association (NBA) players to commit to the Olympics was the pandemic's impact on the league's schedule. The 2020 NBA Finals did not end until October 11, 2020. Although the start of the 2020–21 NBA season was delayed, it still began 71 days after the prior Finals, as opposed to the usual 100 days or more. The season was condensed with many back-to-back games. While the 2021 Finals were scheduled to allow players time to travel to Tokyo, the playoffs were ongoing while other countries were practicing. The delayed season cut into Team USA's time to gel and learn to play as a team. Moreover, three team members played in the Finals, which did not conclude until July 20, and they missed all of training camp and the pre-Olympic exhibitions in Las Vegas. The United States played their first game in the Olympics on July 25.

== Timeline ==
- February 10, 2020: 44 roster finalists announced
- March 30: Olympics postponed until 2021 due to the COVID-19 pandemic
- March 11, 2021: Player pool expanded to 57
- May 22 Start of NBA playoffs
- June 28: Initial 12-man roster named
- July 6: Start of training camp
- July 10–18: Exhibition games
- July 19 Initial flight to Tokyo
- July 20 End of NBA Finals
- July 25 – August 7: 2020 Summer Olympics

== Roster ==
The United States was coached by Gregg Popovich, who had won five NBA championships as head coach of the San Antonio Spurs. He made his head coaching debut for Team USA on the 2019 World Cup team in China. In February 2020, USA Basketball announced an initial list of 44 finalists for the 2020 Summer Olympics, originally scheduled for July–Aug 2020. After the Games were postponed until 2021, the list of finalists was expanded to 57 to remain flexible. By the end of the 2020–21 NBA season, a number of All-Star level players were either injured or requiring extended recovery time for the upcoming season. Olympic training camp took place while the 2021 NBA playoffs were ongoing. No tryouts were held, with decisions on the final 12-man roster based in part on player health and availability.

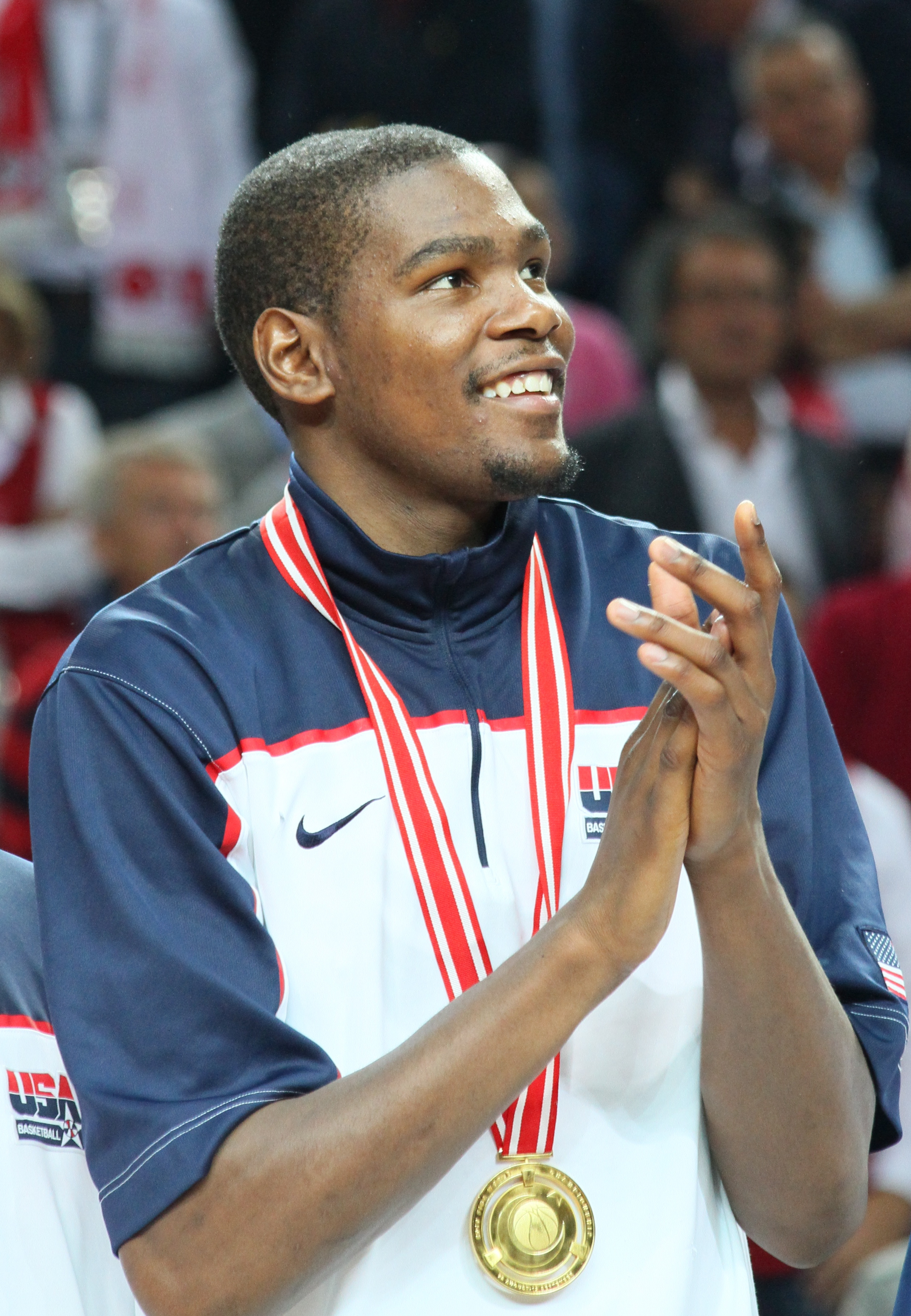
Kevin Durant winning a gold medal on the 2010 FIBA World Championship team in Turkey

An initial 12-man roster was named with a combined 37 NBA All-Star selections, led by Kevin Durant with 11. He entered the 2020 Games ranked second in U.S. men's Olympic basketball history with 311 career points, needing just 25 more to match Carmelo Anthony's record of 336. A two-time Olympic gold medalist from the 2012 and 2016 teams, Durant was joined on the squad by one other gold medal winner, his 2016 teammate Draymond Green, who he also played with on the Golden State Warriors. Also committing to the team were four of the NBA's top 10 scorers from the 2020–21 season with Bradley Beal (31.1 points per game), Damian Lillard (28.8), Zach LaVine (27.4) and Jayson Tatum (26.4). Six players on the roster were named All-Stars in 2021, but only two were among the past season's 15 selections to the All-NBA Team—Lillard (first team) and Beal (second team). While stocked with scorers, the original roster was limited in size; Bam Adebayo and 2012 Olympic gold medalist Kevin Love were the lone traditional interior players. The team also lacked a primary facilitating guard; when not leading a pick and roll, Lillard is primarily an isolation scorer. Alternatively, the United States could have used Durant as a point forward and utilize big men Green and Adebayo's playmaking skills. Jrue Holiday and Khris Middleton of the Milwaukee Bucks and Devin Booker of the Phoenix Suns were named to the roster, but missed all of training camp and the exhibition games while playing in the 2021 NBA Finals. Middleton and Tatum were the only returnees from the 2019 World Cup team.

After playing in three exhibition games, Beal was ruled out for the Olympics after testing positive for COVID-19. A starter in all three games, he was expected to be one of the team's primary scorers. Love also withdrew from the team, stating that he was not fully recovered from a right calf injury that sidelined him for much of the prior NBA season. They were replaced by JaVale McGee and Keldon Johnson. A journeyman, 7-foot (2.1 m), shot-blocking center, McGee was a finalist for the Olympic team and has won three NBA championships, including two with Durant and Green on the Warriors. He helped to fill Team USA's need for size after being outrebounded during exhibition games. The second-year forward Johnson had been playing with the Olympic team as a member of the U.S. Select Team and had been with San Antonio for two seasons under Popovich. USA Basketball director Jerry Colangelo stated that injuries and players' contract status, among other factors, impacted the roster decisions. "Some people say, ‘Well what about that guy?’ Well, there is a reason. You think we're stupid? We know who can play and who can't play", he said.

The roster was updated on July 16, 2021.

United States men's national basketball team – 2020 Summer Olympics roster
Players
Coaches

Pos.	No.	Name	Age – Date of birth	Height	Club	Ctr.
C	13	Bam Adebayo	24 – July 18, 1997	6 ft 9 in (2.06 m)	Miami Heat	(United States)
G	15	Devin Booker	24 – October 30, 1996	6 ft 5 in (1.96 m)	Phoenix Suns	(United States)
F	7	Kevin Durant	32 – September 29, 1988	6 ft 10 in (2.08 m)	Brooklyn Nets	(United States)
F	9	Jerami Grant	27 – March 12, 1994	6 ft 8 in (2.03 m)	Detroit Pistons	(United States)
F	14	Draymond Green	31 – March 4, 1990	6 ft 6 in (1.98 m)	Golden State Warriors	(United States)
G	12	Jrue Holiday	31 – June 12, 1990	6 ft 3 in (1.91 m)	Milwaukee Bucks	(United States)
F	4	Keldon Johnson	21 – October 11, 1999	6 ft 5 in (1.96 m)	San Antonio Spurs	(United States)
G	5	Zach LaVine	26 – March 10, 1995	6 ft 5 in (1.96 m)	Chicago Bulls	(United States)
G	6	Damian Lillard	31 – July 15, 1990	6 ft 2 in (1.88 m)	Portland Trail Blazers	(United States)
C	11	JaVale McGee	33 – January 19, 1988	7 ft 0 in (2.13 m)	Denver Nuggets	(United States)
F	8	Khris Middleton	29 – August 12, 1991	6 ft 7 in (2.01 m)	Milwaukee Bucks	(United States)
F	10	Jayson Tatum	23 – March 3, 1998	6 ft 8 in (2.03 m)	Boston Celtics	(United States)

Head coach

- (United States) Gregg Popovich

Assistant coach(es)

- (United States) Steve Kerr
- (United States) Lloyd Pierce
- (United States) Jay Wright
- (Nigeria) Ime Udoka

Legend

- Club – describes last
  club before the tournament
- Age – describes age
  on July 25, 2021

Roster

The following were also candidates to make the team:

Earlier candidates
Player	NBA team (Note: Team at the time player was a candidate)	Added	Removed	Reason
Marcus Smart	Boston Celtics	February 10, 2020	March 11, 2021	Injured
Klay Thompson	Golden State Warriors	February 10, 2020	March 11, 2021	Injured
LaMarcus Aldridge	Brooklyn Nets	February 10, 2020	April 16, 2021	Retired
Victor Oladipo	Miami Heat	February 10, 2020	May 12, 2021	Injured
LeBron James	Los Angeles Lakers	February 10, 2020	June 3, 2021	Withdrew
Anthony Davis	Los Angeles Lakers	February 10, 2020	June 7, 2021	Injured
Jimmy Butler	Miami Heat	February 10, 2020	June 16, 2021	Withdrew
Stephen Curry	Golden State Warriors	February 10, 2020	June 21, 2021	Withdrew
Donovan Mitchell	Utah Jazz	February 10, 2020	June 21, 2021	Injured
Chris Paul	Phoenix Suns	February 10, 2020	June 22, 2021	Withdrew
Kyrie Irving	Brooklyn Nets	February 10, 2020	June 23, 2021	Injured
Kyle Lowry	Toronto Raptors	February 10, 2020	June 23, 2021	Withdrew
James Harden	Brooklyn Nets	February 10, 2020	June 24, 2021	Injured
Harrison Barnes	Sacramento Kings	February 10, 2020	June 28, 2021	Not named to 12-man roster
Malcolm Brogdon	Indiana Pacers	February 10, 2020	June 28, 2021	Not named to 12-man roster
Jaylen Brown	Boston Celtics	February 10, 2020	June 28, 2021	Not named to 12-man roster
Mike Conley	Utah Jazz	February 10, 2020	June 28, 2021	Not named to 12-man roster
DeMar DeRozan	San Antonio Spurs	February 10, 2020	June 28, 2021	Not named to 12-man roster
Andre Drummond	Los Angeles Lakers	February 10, 2020	June 28, 2021	Not named to 12-man roster
Paul George	Los Angeles Clippers	February 10, 2020	June 28, 2021	Not named to 12-man roster
Montrezl Harrell	Los Angeles Lakers	February 10, 2020	June 28, 2021	Not named to 12-man roster
Joe Harris	Brooklyn Nets	February 10, 2020	June 28, 2021	Not named to 12-man roster
Tobias Harris	Philadelphia 76ers	February 10, 2020	June 28, 2021	Not named to 12-man roster
Gordon Hayward	Charlotte Hornets	February 10, 2020	June 28, 2021	Not named to 12-man roster
Dwight Howard	Philadelphia 76ers	February 10, 2020	June 28, 2021	Not named to 12-man roster
Brandon Ingram	New Orleans Pelicans	February 10, 2020	June 28, 2021	Not named to 12-man roster
Kyle Kuzma	Los Angeles Lakers	February 10, 2020	June 28, 2021	Not named to 12-man roster
Kawhi Leonard	Los Angeles Clippers	February 10, 2020	June 28, 2021	Not named to 12-man roster
Brook Lopez	Milwaukee Bucks	February 10, 2020	June 28, 2021	Not named to 12-man roster
Mason Plumlee	Detroit Pistons	February 10, 2020	June 28, 2021	Not named to 12-man roster
Myles Turner	Indiana Pacers	February 10, 2020	June 28, 2021	Not named to 12-man roster
Kemba Walker	Boston Celtics	February 10, 2020	June 28, 2021	Not named to 12-man roster
Russell Westbrook	Washington Wizards	February 10, 2020	June 28, 2021	Not named to 12-man roster
Derrick White	San Antonio Spurs	February 10, 2020	June 28, 2021	Not named to 12-man roster
Jarrett Allen	Cleveland Cavaliers	March 11, 2021	June 28, 2021	Not named to 12-man roster
Eric Gordon	Houston Rockets	March 11, 2021	June 28, 2021	Not named to 12-man roster
Blake Griffin	Brooklyn Nets	March 11, 2021	June 28, 2021	Not named to 12-man roster
DeAndre Jordan	Brooklyn Nets	March 11, 2021	June 28, 2021	Not named to 12-man roster
Julius Randle	New York Knicks	March 11, 2021	June 28, 2021	Not named to 12-man roster
Duncan Robinson	Miami Heat	March 11, 2021	June 28, 2021	Not named to 12-man roster
Mitchell Robinson	New York Knicks	March 11, 2021	June 28, 2021	Not named to 12-man roster
Fred VanVleet	Toronto Raptors	March 11, 2021	June 28, 2021	Not named to 12-man roster
John Wall	Houston Rockets	March 11, 2021	June 28, 2021	Not named to 12-man roster
Zion Williamson	New Orleans Pelicans	March 11, 2021	June 28, 2021	Not named to 12-man roster
Christian Wood	Houston Rockets	March 11, 2021	June 28, 2021	Not named to 12-man roster
Trae Young	Atlanta Hawks	March 11, 2021	June 28, 2021	Not named to 12-man roster
Bradley Beal	Washington Wizards	February 10, 2020	July 15, 2021	COVID-19
Kevin Love	Cleveland Cavaliers	February 10, 2020	July 16, 2021	Injured

== Exhibition games ==
With Booker, Holiday, and Middleton still playing in the NBA Finals, Team USA added seven players to the roster from the U.S. Select Team for the exhibition games: Saddiq Bey, Darius Garland, John Jenkins, Keldon Johnson, Josh Magette, Dakota Mathias and Cam Reynolds. The Americans began their exhibition schedule after four days of training camp. They played four games in eight days, with a fifth game cancelled because of coronavirus issues. Johnson was promoted to the Olympic team before the final exhibition game. The Americans did not play with the signature up-tempo style of the past three Olympic gold-medal teams under former coach Mike Krzyzewski. Their slower pace left the team, unfamiliar with each other after only six practices, dependent on reading and reacting to each other.

=== Nigeria ===
July 10, 2021

Nigeria	90–87	United States
Scoring by quarter: 22–23, 19–20, 25–21, 24–23
Pts: Vincent 21; Rebs: Achiuwa, Nwamu 7 Asts: Vincent 4		Pts: Durant 17; Rebs: Tatum 7 Asts: Durant, Lillard 4

Michelob Ultra Arena
Las Vegas, Nevada

In their first game, the United States was upset 90–87 by Nigeria, the first win by an African team over the American men's team. The Nigerians played as a more cohesive unit after about three weeks of training. In their last two meetings, Team USA had beaten them by 83 points at the 2012 London Olympics and 44 points in an exhibition game prior to the 2016 Rio Olympics. The Americans fell to 54–3 in major exhibitions games since 1992, when NBA players were first allowed to play for Team USA, with previous losses to Australia ahead of the 2019 World Cup and to Italy before the 2004 Olympics.

=== Australia ===
July 12, 2021

Australia	91–83	United States
Scoring by quarter: 24–27, 13–19, 32–18, 22–19
Pts: Mills 22; Rebs: Kay 9 Asts: three players 4		Pts: Lillard 22; Rebs: Durant, Lillard 4 Asts: Green 5

Michelob Ultra Arena
Las Vegas, Nevada

Team USA lost their second straight exhibition game 91–83 to Australia. It was the fourth loss in five games for the Americans dating back to the 2019 World Cup. The Americans held a 10-point lead in the second half, but they were held without a field goal in the last 4:34. The Boomers, who shot 53% from the field, were led by Patty Mills with 22 points and Joe Ingles with 17. The United States got 22 points from Damian Lillard and 17 from Kevin Durant.

=== Argentina ===
July 13, 2021

Argentina	80–108	United States
Scoring by quarter: 19–33, 23–25, 20–23, 18–27
Pts: Scola 16; Rebs: Brussino 5 Asts: Laprovíttola 3		Pts: Durant, Beal 17; Rebs: Durant, Beal 6 Asts: Adebayo 5

Michelob Ultra Arena
Las Vegas, Nevada

Durant and Bradley Beal both scored 17, and the Americans led throughout in a 108–80 win over Argentina. The United States jumped to a 15–4 lead almost 3 1/2 minutes into the game, scoring 33 points in the first quarter while leading by as much as 17. They led 58–42 at halftime, and shot 51% for the game. Argentina was held to 31% shooting on 3-pointers, making 9 of 29. They were led by Luis Scola, who scored 16 points in 19 minutes.

Already missing three players to the NBA Finals, Team USA was down to eight Olympic players after Jayson Tatum was held out of the game due to a sore right knee. The win avoided the first U.S. three-game losing streak since NBA players were allowed on the national team.

=== Australia ===
July 16, 2021

Australia	vs.	United States
Cancelled

Michelob Ultra Arena
Las Vegas, Nevada

A day before it was scheduled to be played, USA Basketball announced that their second game against Australia was canceled "out of an abundance of caution" after Beal and Jerami Grant had been placed on COVID-19 health and safety protocols. Beal, who tested positive, was also ruled out for the Olympics.

=== Spain ===
July 18, 2021

Spain	76–83	United States
Scoring by quarter: 18–14, 20–22, 12–21, 26–26
Pts: Rubio 23; Rebs: Garuba 8 Asts: Rodríguez 3		Pts: Lillard 19; Rebs: Tatum 6 Asts: Lillard 6

Michelob Ultra Arena
Las Vegas, Nevada

Lillard scored 19 points and newly promoted teammate Johnson had 15 in the United States' 83–76 win over Spain. Behind by as many as nine points in the first half, Team USA was down 46–42 in the third quarter when they scored 11 unanswered points in a 23–6 run that spanned into the fourth quarter. Johnson scored eight points during the spurt, including a dunk which excited the crowd. The Americans led 65–52 with 7:30 remaining, and Spain never got closer than seven points. The Spaniards were led by Ricky Rubio with 23 points.

Durant, Lillard, and LaVine made a combined nine 3-pointers. Johnson shot 7 of 9 and had a team-high plus–minus of plus-18. Grant returned to the team after being in health and safety protocols. Johnson had appeared in two previous exhibition games. JaVale McGee, who was added to the team with Johnson, was present but did not play.

== Olympic play ==
After the final exhibition game against Spain, LaVine was placed into health and safety protocols, and did not travel with the rest of the team to Tokyo on July 19. He was later cleared and joined the team on July 22. The NBA Finals concluded in six games on July 20, with Milwaukee winning over Phoenix. Holiday and Middleton attended the Bucks' championship parade on July 22. They flew the next day to Seattle, where they took a private plane with Booker and arrived in Tokyo on July 24 before 11:00 pm JST (UTC+9), less than 24 hours before Team USA's opening game against France. The Americans lost to the French, but recovered to finish 2–1 in group play to advance to the knockout round.

=== Preliminary round ===
The Olympics feature 12 nations divided into three groups of four. The United States was placed in Group A. Each team plays three games, one game each against the other teams in their group. The first- and second-place teams advance to the knockout stage, along with the top two third-place teams. The remaining four teams are eliminated.

Pos	Team	Pld	W	L	PF	PA	PD	Pts	Qualification
1	France	3	3	0	259	215	+44	6	Quarterfinals
2	United States	3	2	1	315	233	+82	5	Quarterfinals
3	Czech Republic	3	1	2	245	294	−49	4	
4	Iran	3	0	3	206	283	−77	3	

Source: TOCOG and FIBA
Rules for classification: 1) classification points; 2) head-to-head results; 3) head-to-head game points difference; 4) head-to-head number of game points scored.

All times are JST (UTC+9)

==== France ====
25 July 2021
21:00
v

Boxscore

France	83–76	United States
Scoring by quarter: 15–22, 22–23, 25–11, 21–20
Pts: Fournier 28; Rebs: Gobert 9 Asts: Batum, De Colo 5		Pts: Holiday 18; Rebs: Adebayo 10; Asts: Green, Holiday 4

Saitama Super Arena, Saitama
Referees: Guilherme Locatelli (BRA), Michael Weiland (CAN), Manuel Mazzoni (ITA)

Team USA's 25-game winning streak in the Olympics ended after a 83–76 loss to France. The Americans led by seven points in the final 3:30 of the game, but the French took the lead for good after Evan Fournier made a 3-pointer with a minute remaining. He scored a game-high 28 points on 11-for-22 shooting. On the next possession, the United States attempted five shots but missed them all, the last three being open 3-point attempts by LaVine, Durant, and Holiday. France ended the game on a 16–2 run, and the Americans did not make a basket in the last 4 1/2 minutes of the game.

The Americans led by 10 early in the third quarter after Durant made the opening shot after halftime. Their offense, however, went stagnant. After France played 7-foot (2.1 m) big men Rudy Gobert and Vincent Poirier together for most of the second half, the United States scored just 29 points in the final 18 minutes. Durant picked up his fourth foul with 16:45 left in the game. Nando de Colo made a 3-pointer with 2:42 left in the third to give France a 55–54 lead, and they outscored the U.S. team 25–11 in the period to enter the fourth quarter up 62–56. Holiday opened the fourth scoring 12 points in the first 4 1/2 minutes, and Team USA led by six with 5:23 left.

Gobert scored 14 points for France and de Colo finished with 13. Holiday had a team-high 18 points for the United States and added seven rebounds and four assists in 27 minutes off the bench. Despite having just arrived in Tokyo, he was the team's best player. However, their main scorers were quiet towards the finish. In foul trouble, Durant made just 4 of 12 for 10 points in one of the worst games of his Olympic career. Lillard was 3 of 10 for 11 points. The team made just 31% of its 3-pointers. Adebayo added 12 points and 10 rebounds for the Americans. The other NBA Finals players, Booker and Middleton, both played, but not as effectively as Holiday, who also led the team in minutes (27:52). The United States and France last met in the 2019 World Cup, when the French eliminated the Americans from medal contention. France returned seven players on their Olympic team from that squad. Team USA's last loss in the Olympics was in 2004, when they settled for a bronze medal in Athens.

==== Iran ====
28 July 2021
13:40
v

Boxscore

United States	120–66	Iran
Scoring by quarter: 28–12, 32–18, 22–13, 38–23
Pts: Lillard 21; Rebs: Booker, Durant 5 Asts: LaVine 8		Pts: Haddadi, Jamshidi 14; Rebs: Haddadi 7 Asts: Jalalpoor, Jamshidi 3

Saitama Super Arena, Saitama
Referees: Antonio Conde (ESP), Yohan Rosso (FRA), Andreia Silva (BRA)

The United States earned its first win in a 120–66 blowout over an overmatched Iran team. Lillard bounced back from his struggles in the opener to score 21 points on seven 3-pointers, including six of Team USA's 13 makes in the first half. They led 28–12 after the first quarter, expanding the margin to 30 after LaVine made their 10th three-pointer in 17 attempts to open the game, making it 47–17. The U.S. squad was 19 of 39 on 3-pointers, and made 23 of its 37 attempts (62%) inside the three-point line. Iran was ranked No. 23 in the world, ahead of only Japan—which qualified as the host country—in the 12-team Olympic field.

Popovich moved Holiday and Booker into the starting lineup in place of LaVine and Green. The Americans played faster with the three-guard lineup, scoring 19 fast-break points in the first half. The pace, in turn, led to a succession of open shots. Six U.S. players made multiple 3-pointers. Team USA had 34 assists on 42 baskets, and six players scored in double figures. Booker had 16 points and had five rebounds, Tatum scored 14 and LaVine added 13. The United States defense forced 23 turnovers, which led to 37 points. Iran's 7-foot-2-inch (2.18 m) center Hamed Haddadi led the team with 15 points and six rebounds. They shot just 37% for the game.

==== Czech Republic ====
31 July 2021
21:00
v

Boxscore

United States	119–84	Czech Republic
Scoring by quarter: 18–25, 29–18, 35–17, 37–24
Pts: Tatum 27; Rebs: Durant 8 Asts: Durant 6		Pts: Schilb 17; Rebs: Satoranský 6 Asts: Satoranský 8

Saitama Super Arena, Saitama
Referees: Aleksandar Glišić (SRB), Manuel Mazzoni (ITA), Maripier Malo (CAN)

The U.S. team defeated the Czech Republic 119–84 to advance to the quarterfinals. Tatum scored a game-high 27 points, and Durant had 23 points, eight rebounds and six assists. The Czechs made eight of their first 11 shots to establish a 10-point lead, and they led the entire first quarter, outshooting the Americans 65% to 35%. Durant made a 3-pointer in the second quarter to put Team USA up for good. The basket also moved him past Carmelo Anthony to become the U.S. men's basketball team's all-time Olympic scoring leader. Durant scored 14 points in the first half, and the Americans led by as many as seven before going into halftime ahead 47–43. They outscored the Czech Republic 29–13 in the third quarter, which they ended with a 22–6 run to lead by 22 to begin the fourth. Tatum scored 17 in the final quarter while Durant rested.

After making just seven of 20 shots in the first quarter, the United States shot 33 of 44 over the next 26 minutes, including 21 of 25 to open the second half. Lavine scored 13 points, Holiday added 11, and McGee finished with 10. Holiday was again outstanding on defense, providing constant pressure on the ball and recording three steals. Blake Schilb led the Czechs with 17 points.

=== Knockout round ===
Quarterfinals
3 August
Italy	75
France	84
3 August
Slovenia	94
Germany	70
3 August
Spain	81
United States	95
3 August
Australia	97
Argentina	59

Semifinals
5 August
France	90
Slovenia	89
5 August
United States	97
Australia	78

Gold medal
7 August
France	82
United States	87
Bronze medal
7 August
Slovenia	93
Australia	107

As the top second-place team in group play, the United States qualified for the seeded pot of the draw and avoided facing any of the group winners in the quarterfinals. They were drawn to face Spain, who the Americans beat for the gold medal in 2008 and 2012, and who they also defeated in the 2016 semifinals. Durant averaged 27 points per game and shot 53.7% from the field in the three knockout games to lead the team to gold.

==== Quarterfinal – Spain ====
3 August 2021
13:40
v

Boxscore

Spain	81–95	United States
Scoring by quarter: 21–19, 22–24, 20–26, 18–26
Pts: Rubio 38; Rebs: W. Hernangómez 10; Asts: W. Hernangómez 3		Pts: Durant 29; Rebs: Booker 9 Asts: Booker, Holiday 5

Saitama Super Arena, Saitama
Referees: Guilherme Locatelli (BRA), Yohan Rosso (FRA), Michael Weiland (CAN)

Durant scored 29 points and Team USA advanced to the medal round with a 95–81 win over Spain. The Americans trailed by 10 in the second quarter, before outscoring the Spaniards 36–10 over the next nine minutes. Durant had 13 points in the third quarter, include three 3-pointers, to help the team overcome its sluggish start. The United States was 9 of 15 on 3-pointers in the second half after making only 4 of 17 in the first. Ricky Rubio scored a game-high 38 points, which also set an Olympic record for Spain. It was the most points scored against the U.S. team in the Olympics or any other major event, surpassing Dirk Nowitzki's 34 points for Germany against the Americans in the 2002 World Championship.

Spain was behind 17–10 early, but went on a 29–12 run over 10 minutes and led 39–29 with 3:25 remaining in the first half. However, Team USA went on its own spurt, outscoring the Spaniards 14–4 and tying the score 43–43 at halftime after scoring seven straight in the final 70 seconds. The United States opened the third quarter with a 22–6 run, and they led by as many as 16 before entering the fourth up 69–63. Durant shot 10 for 17 from the field, including 4 of 7 on 3-pointers. He led five Americans who scored in double figures, including Tatum (13), Holiday (12) Lillard (11), and LaVine (10). Sergio Rodríguez scored 16 and Willy Hernangómez added 10 for Spain.

==== Semifinal – Australia ====
5 August 2021
13:15
v

Boxscore

United States	97–78	Australia
Scoring by quarter: 18–24, 24–21, 32–10, 23–23
Pts: Durant 23; Rebs: Durant 9 Asts: Holiday 8		Pts: Mills 15; Rebs: Landale 6 Asts: Mills 8

Saitama Super Arena, Saitama
Referees: Ademir Zurapović (BIH), Michael Weiland (CAN), Manuel Mazzoni (ITA)

Durant scored a game-high 23 points, and the United States overcame another slow start for a 97–78 victory against Australia. The Americans trailed the Boomers by 15 midway through the second quarter, before a 48–14 run put them ahead 74–55 after three quarters. After Team USA missed their first 10 three-pointers of the game, Booker hit their first late in the second period with 3:22 left. He scored 11 points in the third and finished with 20 points and three 3-pointers. Patty Mills led the Australians with 15 points, but he shot just 5 of 14.

Australia took an early eight-point lead while holding the United States to only one basket in the first four minutes. The Aussies led 24–18 to start the second quarter. They scored eight straight points to lead 41–26 with 5:23 left in the first half. After making 13 of their first 26 shots, the Boomers made just 3 of their next 16, including just one basket the rest of the half. They still led by 11 points with 2:59 remaining, but Team USA scored the last eight points of the half to cut the deficit to 45–42. Holiday made two baskets and Durant hit three in the Americans' 12–0 run to start the second half, part of a combined 20–0 stretch over 6:56 from the second quarter. They outscored Australia 32–10 in the third. Durant made 10 of 19 shots in the contest and had a game-high nine rebounds. Team USA got 11 points each from Middleton and Holiday, who also finished with eight rebounds and eight assists and was the primary defender on Mills. Dante Exum scored 12 points and Jock Landale added 11 points for the Australians.

==== Final – France ====
7 August 2021
11:30
v

Boxscore

France	82–87	United States
Scoring by quarter: 18–22, 21–22, 24–27, 19–16
Pts: Fournier, Gobert 16; Rebs: Gobert 8 Asts: de Colo 7		Pts: Durant 29; Rebs: Tatum 7 Asts: Green 5

Saitama Super Arena, Saitama
Referees: Guilherme Locatelli (BRA), Ademir Zurapović (BIH), Michael Weiland (CAN)

Led by 29 points by Durant, Team USA won their fourth consecutive gold medal with an 87–82 win over France. The Americans led by 10 to begin the fourth quarter, but the French pulled to within three points twice, including with 10 seconds left in the game. Durant made two free throws to seal the game with eight seconds remaining. Tatum scored 19 points off the bench for the United States. France got 16 points each from Fournier and Gobert, who also had eight rebounds. Durant joined Carmelo Anthony as the only three-time gold medalists in U.S. men's Olympic basketball history.

France took a 10–4 lead in the game's opening minutes. After the U.S. squad missed their first eight 3-pointers of the contest, Durant made one with 2:04 left in the first quarter, beginning a 21–8 stretch for the Americans for a 39–26 lead in the middle of the second. The French, however, used a 13–5 run to trail just 44–39 at halftime. They pulled to within two early in the third quarter. Team USA was momentarily up by 14, but Batum made a 3-pointer before the third-quarter buzzer to cut the U.S. lead to 71–63 entering the last quarter. After a Frank Ntilikina 3-pointer brought France to within 73–70 with 5:42 remaining, the United States went on a 9–2 spurt to lead by 10. Durant's free throws with 8.8 seconds left put the Americans ahead by five. He averaged 20.7 points, 5.3 rebounds and 3.7 assists in the Olympics, and FIBA named him the tournament's MVP.

France tried to leverage the 7-foot-1-inch (2.16 m) Gobert's size advantage, forcing Durant to switch onto him. Gobert drew nine fouls, three on Durant, but he shot just 6 of 13 on his free throws. In another stout performance on defense, Holiday had three steals and a block and helped limit Fournier to 5-of-15 shooting from the field. Holiday and Middleton became the fifth and sixth players to win an NBA championship and Olympic gold in the same year, joining Michael Jordan, Scottie Pippen, Kyrie Irving and LeBron James. France received the silver medal for the third time in the Olympics, all coming in gold-medal-game losses to the United States.

=== Statistics ===
Legend
GP	Games played	GS	Games started	MPG	Minutes per game
FGM	Field goals made	FGA	Field goals attempted	FG%	Field goal percentage
3PM	3-point field goals made	3PA	3-point field goals attempted	3P%	3-point field goal percentage
FTM	Free throws made	FTA	Free throws attempted	FT%	Free throw percentage
RPG	Rebounds per game	APG	Assists per game	PPG	Points per game

Player	GP	GS	MPG	FGM	FGA	FG%	3PM	3PA	3P%	FTM	FTA	FT%	RPG	APG	PPG
Kevin Durant	6	6	27.5	45	85	.529	15	40	.375	19	21	.905	5.3	3.7	20.7
Jayson Tatum	6	0	20.5	33	67	.493	17	38	.447	8	11	.727	3.3	1.2	15.2
Jrue Holiday	6	5	25.7	28	58	.483	7	20	.350	8	12	.667	4.8	3.8	11.8
Damian Lillard	6	6	24.0	23	60	.383	16	46	.348	5	9	.556	2.7	3.2	11.2
Zach LaVine	6	1	18.7	21	35	.600	10	22	.455	6	7	.857	2.0	3.3	9.7
Devin Booker	6	5	20.7	19	45	.422	5	15	.333	13	14	.929	3.2	1.8	9.3
Bam Adebayo	6	6	19.3	16	28	.571	0	0	–	6	10	.600	5.7	1.8	6.3
JaVale McGee	4	0	5.0	10	13	.769	0	1	.000	5	6	.833	1.3	0.0	6.3
Khris Middleton	6	0	15.7	14	31	.452	6	17	.353	1	2	.500	1.8	1.7	5.8
Draymond Green	6	1	17.7	7	9	.778	3	3	1.000	4	4	1.000	3.0	2.8	3.5
Jerami Grant	4	0	5.0	1	3	.333	1	2	.500	1	2	.500	1.3	0.8	1.0
Keldon Johnson	4	0	5.5	1	3	.333	0	1	.00	2	2	1.000	0.8	0.8	1.0
Total	6	6	200	218	437	.499	80	205	.390	78	100	.780	37.3	24.3	99.0
Opponents	6	6	200	169	380	.445	53	151	.351	83	123	.675	37.0	18.0	79.0
