= Keldon Johnson =

American basketball player (born 1999)

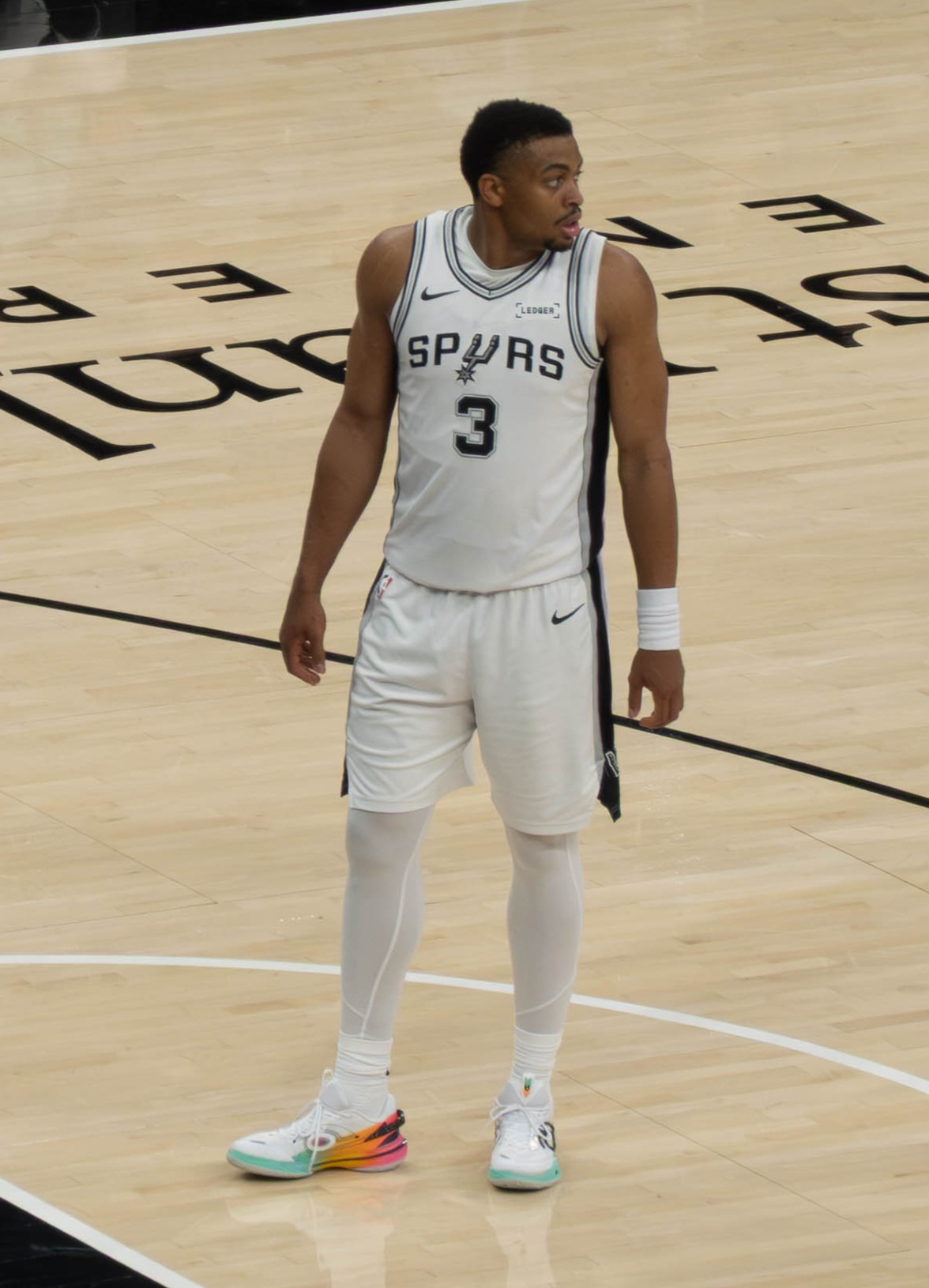
- Johnson with the San Antonio Spurs in 2026

No. 3 – San Antonio Spurs
- Position: Small forward / shooting guard
- League: NBA

Personal information
- Born: October 11, 1999 (age 27) Chesterfield, Virginia, U.S.
- Listed height: 6 ft 5 in (1.96 m)
- Listed weight: 220 lb (100 kg)

Career information
- High school: Park View (South Hill, Virginia); Huntington Prep (Huntington, West Virginia); Oak Hill Academy (Mouth of Wilson, Virginia)
- College: Kentucky (2018–2019)
- NBA draft: 2019: 1st round, 29th overall pick
- Drafted by: San Antonio Spurs
- Playing career: 2019–present

Career history
- 2019–present: San Antonio Spurs
- 2019–2020: →Austin Spurs

Career highlights
- NBA Sixth Man of the Year (2026); SEC Freshman of the Year – Coaches (2019); McDonald's All-American (2018)
- Stats at NBA.com
- Stats at Basketball Reference
Medals
Men's basketball
Representing the United States
Olympic Games
Gold medal – first place	2020 Tokyo	Team

Keldon Wilder Johnson (born October 11, 1999) is an American professional basketball player for the San Antonio Spurs of the National Basketball Association (NBA). He played college basketball for the Kentucky Wildcats.

Johnson attended Oak Hill Academy in Mouth of Wilson, Virginia. He was selected in the first round of the 2019 NBA draft by the Spurs with the 29th overall pick. In 2021, he won an Olympic gold medal in basketball as a member of the United States national team. Johnson was named the NBA Sixth Man of the Year with the Spurs in 2026 and reached the NBA Finals that same season.

== Early life ==
Johnson was born in Chesterfield, Virginia, a suburb of Richmond, and grew up in the rural Virginia community of South Hill. The son of a truck driver and a nurse, he grew up with three siblings. Often called a "country boy," he enjoyed fishing and hunting growing up.

== High school career ==
Johnson played his freshman and sophomore high school seasons at Park View High School in South Hill. His freshman basketball season, he broke the Virginia High School League ninth-grade scoring record by averaging just over 27 points per game, and he earned all-state first team honors as a sophomore, positioning himself as a top 15 national that year. He then joined the elite basketball programs at Huntington Prep School in West Virginia and Oak Hill Academy in Virginia, in his junior and senior years, respectively.

During his time at Oak Hill, he was named the Virginia Gatorade High School Player of the Year and was selected to both the McDonald's All American Game and the Jordan Brand Classic Game.

Johnson was rated as a five-star recruit and ranked as the 13th best player in the 2018 class by 247Sports.com. He committed to University of Kentucky to play college basketball, being joined by fellow recruits Immanuel Quickley, E. J. Montgomery, Ashton Hagans, and Tyler Herro.

College recruiting
Name	Hometown	School	Height	Weight	Commit date
Keldon Johnson; SG/SF	South Hill, VA	Oak Hill Academy (VA)	6 ft 6 in (1.98 m)	205 lb (93 kg)	Nov 11, 2017
Keldon Johnson; SG/SF	Recruit ratings: Rivals: 247Sports: ESPN: (94)				
Overall recruit ranking: Rivals: 15 247Sports: 18 ESPN: 7
Note: In many cases, Scout, Rivals, 247Sports, On3, and ESPN may conflict in their listings of height and weight.; In these cases, the average was taken. ESPN grades are on a 100-point scale.; Sources: "Kentucky 2018 Basketball Commitments". Rivals.; "2018 Kentucky Wildcats Recruiting Class". ESPN.; "2018 Team Ranking". Rivals.

== College career ==
As a freshman, Johnson averaged 13.5 points and 5.9 rebounds per game, shooting 46.1 percent from the field and 38.1 percent from behind the arc. He scored 19 points in a win over top-ranked Tennessee on February 16, 2019. Johnson pulled down a career-high 17 rebounds in a victory over Auburn. Following the season he declared for the NBA draft.

== Professional career ==
=== San Antonio Spurs (2019–present) ===
On June 20, 2019, Johnson was selected with the 29th overall pick by the San Antonio Spurs in the 2019 NBA draft. The Spurs obtained the draft pick used to draft Johnson in a 2018 trade; in that trade, Spurs small forward Kawhi Leonard was sent to the Toronto Raptors in exchange for Raptors shooting guard DeMar DeRozan, center Jakob Pöltl, and a draft choice. Johnson was later listed in the roster of San Antonio Spurs for 2019 NBA Summer League hosted at Vivint Arena. Johnson signed with the Spurs on July 1, 2019. On October 30, Johnson received his first assignment to the Austin Spurs, the Spurs’ affiliate team in the NBA G League.

Johnson made his NBA debut on November 22, 2019, playing two minutes in a 115–104 loss to the Philadelphia 76ers. On August 11, 2020, Johnson scored a season-high 24 points in a 123–105 win over the Houston Rockets with eleven rebounds and three assists. Johnson made 17 total appearances (including one start) for San Antonio during his rookie campaign, averaging 9.1 points and 3.4 rebounds.

Johnson made 69 appearances (starting 67) for the Spurs in the 2020–21 NBA season, recording averages of 12.8 points, 6.0 rebounds, and 1.8 assists. He made 75 appearances (74 starts) for San Antonio during the 2021–22 season, averaging 17.0 points, 6.1 rebounds, and 2.1 assists.

On July 18, 2022, Johnson signed a four-year, $80 million rookie scale contract extension with the Spurs. On January 17, 2023, Johnson scored a career–high 36 points along with 11 rebounds and one assist in a 106–98 win against the Brooklyn Nets. He made 63 starts for the Spurs in the 2022–23 season, averaging career–highs in points (22.0) and assists (2.9), as well as 5.0 rebounds.

On October 31, 2023, Johnson put up 27 points alongside a key steal on Kevin Durant that led to a game-winner in a 115–114 win over the Phoenix Suns. He made 69 total appearances (including 27 starts) for San Antonio during the 2023–24 season, posting averages of 15.7 points, 5.5 rebounds, and 2.8 assists. Johnson made 77 appearances as a reserve for the Spurs during the 2024–25 season, averaging 12.7 points, 4.8 rebounds, and 1.6 assists.

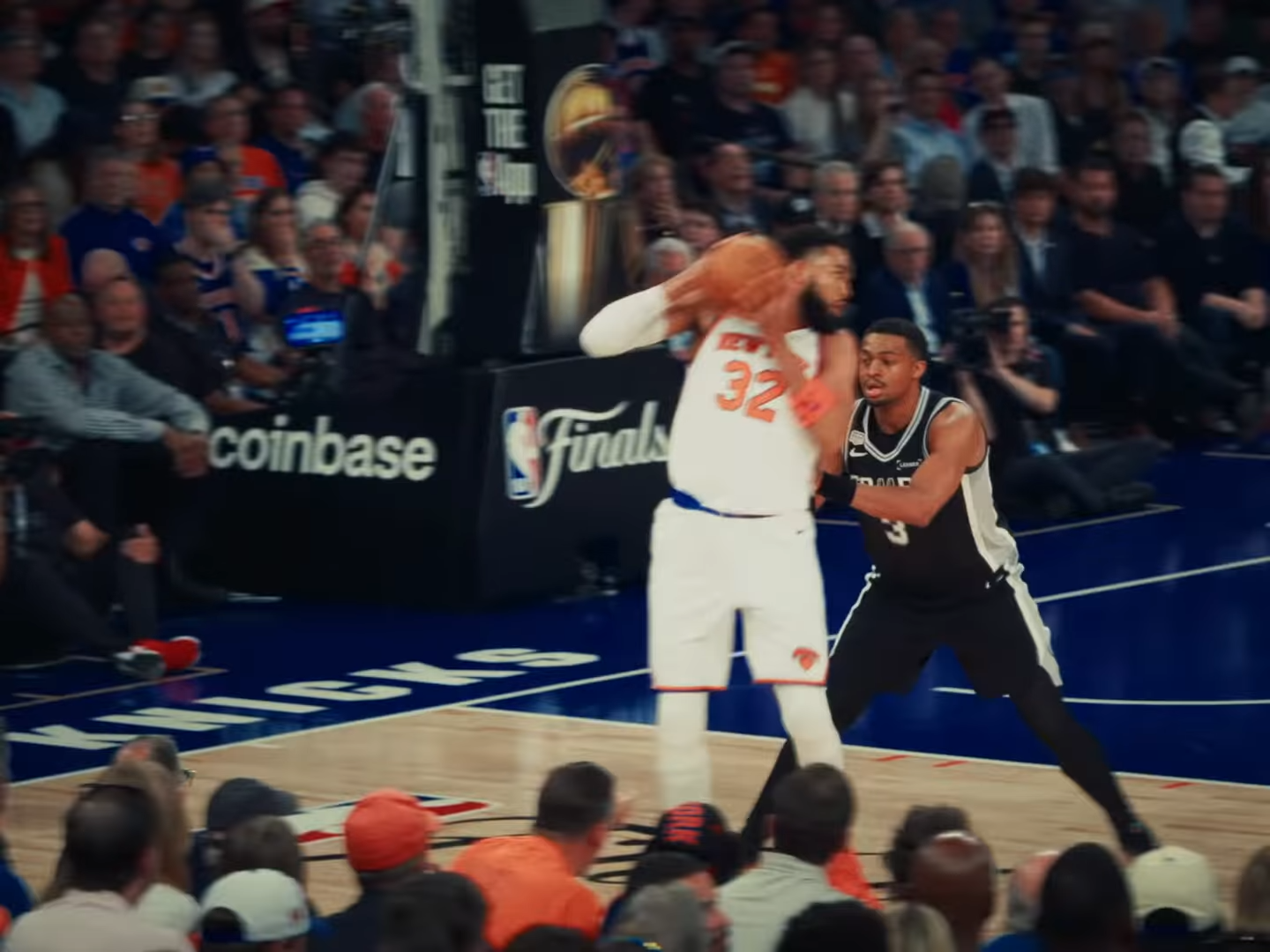
Johnson in Game 3 of the 2026 NBA Finals

As of the 2025–26 season, Johnson is the longest tenured player on the Spurs. He was named NBA Sixth Man of the Year that season. Appearing in all 82 games for San Antonio as a reserve, Johnson recorded averages of 13.2 points, 5.4 rebounds, and 1.4 assists.

== National team career ==
Johnson trained with the USA Men's Junior National Team in 2017 and 2018. In 2021, he was named to the USA Select team on July 1, then added to the men's national team on July 10, training with the 2020 U.S. Olympic team. On July 16, 2021, Johnson and center JaVale McGee were named to the Olympic roster in place of the injured Kevin Love and Bradley Beal, who was kept from traveling to Tokyo for health and safety protocols. Johnson played in four of six games, averaging 5.5 minutes.

== Personal life ==
Johnson majored in undeclared/exploratory studies in agriculture during his college time. He enjoys fishing, hunting, and the outdoors. Since 2021, Johnson has lived in a ranch home outside of San Antonio in the Texas Hill Country; an animal lover, he has numerous goats, chickens, dogs, miniature cows, and horses. He maintains a collection of cowboy hats and boots.

Johnson's brother Kaleb also played college basketball, for Georgetown University during 2015–2019, and was drafted 34th overall by the Austin Spurs in the January 2021 NBA G League draft. Kaleb plays for the Valley Suns following a trade the Austin Spurs made.

== Career statistics ==
Legend
GP	Games played	GS	Games started	MPG	Minutes per game
FG%	Field goal percentage	3P%	3-point field goal percentage	FT%	Free throw percentage
RPG	Rebounds per game	APG	Assists per game	SPG	Steals per game
BPG	Blocks per game	PPG	Points per game	**Bold**	Career high
*	Led the league

=== NBA ===
==== Regular season ====
Year	Team	GP	GS	MPG	FG%	3P%	FT%	RPG	APG	SPG	BPG	PPG
2019–20	San Antonio	17	1	17.7	**.596**	**.591**	**.795**	3.4	.9	**.8**	.1	9.1
2020–21	San Antonio	69	67	28.5	.479	.331	.740	6.0	1.8	.6	**.3**	12.8
2021–22	San Antonio	75	**74**	31.9	.466	.398	.756	**6.1**	2.1	**.8**	.2	17.0
2022–23	San Antonio	63	63	**32.8**	.452	.329	.749	5.0	**2.9**	.7	.2	**22.0**
2023–24	San Antonio	69	27	29.5	.454	.346	.792	5.5	2.8	.7	**.3**	15.7
2024–25	San Antonio	77	0	23.9	.482	.318	.773	4.8	1.6	.6	**.3**	12.7
2025–26	San Antonio	**82**	0	23.3	.519	.363	.794	5.4	1.4	.6	.1	13.2
Career		452	232	27.7	.475	.353	.767	5.4	2.0	.7	.2	15.1

==== Playoffs ====
Year	Team	GP	GS	MPG	FG%	3P%	FT%	RPG	APG	SPG	BPG	PPG
2026	San Antonio	23*	0	17.9	.407	.362	.581	3.3	.9	.7	.1	7.7
Career		23	0	17.9	.407	.362	.581	3.3	.9	.7	.1	7.7

=== College ===
Year	Team	GP	GS	MPG	FG%	3P%	FT%	RPG	APG	SPG	BPG	PPG
2018–19	Kentucky	37	36	30.7	.461	.381	.703	5.9	1.6	.8	.2	13.5
