= 2016 United States men's Olympic basketball team =

- Head coach: Mike Krzyzewski
- Scoring leader: Kevin Durant 19.4
- Rebounding leader: DeAndre Jordan 6.1
- Assists leader: Kyrie Irving 4.9

The men's national basketball team of the United States won the gold medal at the 2016 Summer Olympics in Rio de Janeiro, Brazil. They automatically qualified for the Olympics by winning the FIBA Basketball World Cup in 2014. The team was coached by Mike Krzyzewski of Duke University, with assistant coaches Jim Boeheim (Syracuse), Tom Thibodeau (New York Knicks), and Monty Williams.

== Timeline ==
- August 6, 2015: 34-man roster announced
- January 18, 2016: 30-man roster announced
- July 17: Start of training camp
- July 22 – August 1: Exhibition games
- August 6–21: 2016 Summer Olympics

== Roster ==
The 2016 team consisted of just two returning players from the 2012 Olympic gold-medal winning team, Kevin Durant and the new team captain, Carmelo Anthony.

The following is the United States roster in the men's basketball tournament of the 2016 Summer Olympics.

United States men's national basketball team – 2016 Summer Olympics roster
Players
Coaches

Pos.	No.	Name	Age – Date of birth	Height	Club	Ctr.
G	4	Jimmy Butler	26 – September 14, 1989	6 ft 7 in (2.01 m)	Chicago Bulls	(United States)
F	5	Kevin Durant	27 – September 29, 1988	6 ft 10 in (2.08 m)	Golden State Warriors	(United States)
C	6	DeAndre Jordan	28 – July 21, 1988	6 ft 11 in (2.11 m)	Los Angeles Clippers	(United States)
G	7	Kyle Lowry	30 – March 25, 1986	6 ft 0 in (1.83 m)	Toronto Raptors	(Canada)
F	8	Harrison Barnes	24 – May 30, 1992	6 ft 8 in (2.03 m)	Dallas Mavericks	(United States)
G	9	DeMar DeRozan	26 – August 7, 1989	6 ft 7 in (2.01 m)	Toronto Raptors	(Canada)
G	10	Kyrie Irving	24 – March 23, 1992	6 ft 3 in (1.91 m)	Cleveland Cavaliers	(United States)
G	11	Klay Thompson	26 – February 8, 1990	6 ft 7 in (2.01 m)	Golden State Warriors	(United States)
C	12	DeMarcus Cousins	25 – August 13, 1990	6 ft 10 in (2.08 m)	Sacramento Kings	(United States)
F	13	Paul George	26 – May 2, 1990	6 ft 9 in (2.06 m)	Indiana Pacers	(United States)
F	14	Draymond Green	26 – March 4, 1990	6 ft 6 in (1.98 m)	Golden State Warriors	(United States)
F	15	Carmelo Anthony	32 – May 29, 1984	6 ft 7 in (2.01 m)	New York Knicks	(United States)

Head coach

- Mike Krzyzewski

Assistant coach(es)

- Jim Boeheim
- Tom Thibodeau
- Monty Williams
- Jerry Colangelo (executive director)

Legend

- Club – describes last
  club before the tournament
- Age – describes age
  on August 6, 2016

The following were also candidates to make the team:

Earlier candidates
Player	NBA team (Note: Team at the time player was a candidate)	Added	Removed	Reason
Michael Carter-Williams	Milwaukee Bucks	August 6, 2015	January 18, 2016	30-man roster cut
Tobias Harris	Detroit Pistons	August 6, 2015	January 18, 2016	30-man roster cut
Victor Oladipo	Orlando Magic	August 6, 2015	January 18, 2016	30-man roster cut
Chandler Parsons	Dallas Mavericks	August 6, 2015	January 18, 2016	30-man roster cut
Mason Plumlee	Portland Trail Blazers	August 6, 2015	January 18, 2016	30-man roster cut
Anthony Davis	New Orleans Pelicans	August 6, 2015	March 22, 2016	Injured
Chris Paul	Los Angeles Clippers	August 6, 2015	March 30, 2016	Withdrew
John Wall	Washington Wizards	August 6, 2015	May 5, 2016	Injured
Blake Griffin	Los Angeles Clippers	August 6, 2015	May 6, 2016	Injured
Stephen Curry	Golden State Warriors	August 6, 2015	June 6, 2016	Injured
LaMarcus Aldridge	San Antonio Spurs	August 6, 2015	June 7, 2016	Injured
James Harden	Houston Rockets	August 6, 2015	June 10, 2016	Withdrew
Russell Westbrook	Oklahoma City Thunder	August 6, 2015	June 10, 2016	Withdrew
Kawhi Leonard	San Antonio Spurs	August 6, 2015	June 23, 2016	Withdrew
LeBron James	Cleveland Cavaliers	August 6, 2015	June 23, 2016	Withdrew
Gordon Hayward	Utah Jazz	August 6, 2015	June 23, 2016	Withdrew
Andre Drummond	Detroit Pistons	August 6, 2015	June 23, 2016	Withdrew
Damian Lillard	Portland Trail Blazers	February 10, 2016	June 23, 2016	Withdrew
Bradley Beal	Washington Wizards	August 6, 2015	June 24, 2016	Withdrew
Michael Conley	Memphis Grizzlies	August 6, 2015	June 27, 2016	12-man roster cut
Kenneth Faried	Denver Nuggets	August 6, 2015	June 27, 2016	12-man roster cut
Rudy Gay	Sacramento Kings	August 6, 2015	June 27, 2016	12-man roster cut
Dwight Howard	Houston Rockets	August 6, 2015	June 27, 2016	12-man roster cut
Andre Iguodala	Golden State Warriors	January 18, 2016	June 27, 2016	12-man roster cut
Kevin Love	Cleveland Cavaliers	August 6, 2015	June 27, 2016	12-man roster cut

== 2015 Basketball Showcase ==
On August 12, 2015, USA Basketball announced that 19 NBA players would participate in the following day's 2015 USA Basketball Showcase in Las Vegas, where they were divided into two squads, USA Blue and USA White, with USA Blue being coached by USA National Team assistant coach Monty Williams (Oklahoma City Thunder), and USA White being coached by fellow USA National Team assistant coach Tom Thibodeau (Minnesota Timberwolves).

The Blue Team included starters Harrison Barnes (Golden State Warriors), Bradley Beal (Washington Wizards), DeMar DeRozan (Toronto Raptors), and Andre Drummond (Detroit Pistons), with reserve players Kenneth Faried (Denver Nuggets), Rudy Gay (Sacramento Kings), Amir Johnson (Boston Celtics), Victor Oladipo (Orlando Magic), and Elfrid Payton (Orlando Magic).

The White Team included starters Kawhi Leonard (San Antonio Spurs), Blake Griffin (Los Angeles Clippers), DeMarcus Cousins (Sacramento Kings), Klay Thompson (Golden State Warriors), and Michael Carter-Williams (Milwaukee Bucks), with reserve players Mason Plumlee (Portland Trail Blazers), Terrence Jones (Houston Rockets), Arron Afflalo (New York Knicks), and Draymond Green (Golden State Warriors). C. J. Watson (Orlando Magic) was included in the roster announcement but did not play.

== Exhibition games ==
The United States' 12-man roster began its exhibition schedule against 2004 Olympic champion Argentina. They also faced 2015 FIBA Asia gold medalist China and 2015 FIBA Americas champion Venezuela. The schedule concluded with 2015 FIBA Africa champion Nigeria in Houston. The United States Olympic Committee used Houston as a departure point for many Olympic teams, providing them with credentials and provisions on their way out to Brazil.

July 22, 2016

Report

Argentina	74–111	United States
Scoring by quarter: 14–32, 19–24, 24–24, 17–31
Pts: Nocioni 15; Rebs: Nocioni 7 Asts: Campazzo 6		Pts: Durant 23; Rebs: Cousins 15; Asts: Irving 6

T-Mobile Arena
Las Vegas, Nevada
Attendance: 16,861

July 24, 2016

Report

China	57–106	United States
Scoring by quarter: 13–26, 16–29, 9–23, 19–28
Pts: Yi 18; Rebs: Yi 7 Asts: 3 players tied 2		Pts: Durant 19; Rebs: Anthony 8 Asts: 3 players tied 5

Staples Center
Los Angeles, California
Attendance: 19,060

July 26, 2016

Report

China	57–107	United States
Scoring by quarter: 15–31, 9–21, 15–32, 18–23
Pts: Zhou 13; Rebs: Wang 5 Asts: Guo 6		Pts: Cousins 21; Rebs: Cousins 11; Asts: Thompson 5

Oracle Arena
Oakland, California
Attendance: 19,596

July 29, 2016

Report

Venezuela	45–80	United States
Scoring by quarter: 12–20, 6–16, 13–20, 14–24
Pts: Cox 14; Rebs: Colmenares 10; Asts: Vargas 5		Pts: Thompson, Irving 13; Rebs: Cousins 12; Asts: Green 6

United Center
Chicago, Illinois
Attendance: 20,578

August 1, 2016

Report

Nigeria	66–110	United States
Scoring by quarter: 14–27, 16–27, 15–30, 21–26
Pts: Oguchi 21; Rebs: Diogu 9 Asts: Uzoh 6		Pts: Anthony 19; Rebs: Jordan 9 Asts: Lowry 11

Toyota Center
Houston, Texas
Attendance: 18,247

== Olympic play ==
=== Preliminary round ===
Pos	Team	Pld	W	L	PF	PA	PD	Pts	Qualification
1	United States	5	5	0	524	407	+117	10	Quarterfinals
2	Australia	5	4	1	444	368	+76	9	Quarterfinals
3	France	5	3	2	423	378	+45	8	Quarterfinals
4	Serbia	5	2	3	426	387	+39	7	Quarterfinals
5	Venezuela	5	1	4	315	444	−129	6	
6	China	5	0	5	318	466	−148	5	

Source: FIBA
Rules for classification: 1) points; 2) head-to-head points; 3) head-to-head points difference; 4) head-to-head number of points scored.

==== China ====
6 August 2016
19:00

Boxscore

China	62–119	United States
Scoring by quarter: 10–30, 20–29, 17–32, 15–28
Pts: Yi 25; Rebs: Yi, Zhao 6 Asts: Zhao 5		Pts: Durant 25; Rebs: Anthony, Jordan 7 Asts: Durant 6

Carioca Arena 1, Rio de Janeiro
Attendance: 10,622
Referees: Stephen Seibel (CAN), Oļegs Latiševs (LAT), Sreten Radović (CRO)

==== Venezuela ====
8 August 2016
19:00

Boxscore

United States	113–69	Venezuela
Scoring by quarter: 18–18, 30–8, 27–25, 38–18
Pts: George 20; Rebs: Jordan 9 Asts: Lowry 9		Pts: Cox 19; Rebs: Echenique 7 Asts: Vargas 5

Carioca Arena 1, Rio de Janeiro
Attendance: 10,572
Referees: Eddie Viator (FRA), Damir Javor (SLO), Scott Beker (AUS)

==== Australia ====
10 August 2016
19:00

Boxscore

Australia	88–98	United States
Scoring by quarter: 29–29, 25–20, 13–21, 21–28
Pts: Mills 30; Rebs: Dellavedova 6 Asts: Dellavedova 11		Pts: Anthony 31; Rebs: Anthony, Cousins 8 Asts: Irving 5

Carioca Arena 1, Rio de Janeiro
Attendance: 10,957
Referees: Christos Christodoulou (GRE), Juan Carlos García (ESP), Robert Lottermoser (GER)

==== Serbia ====
12 August 2016
19:00

Boxscore

United States	94–91	Serbia
Scoring by quarter: 27–15, 23–26, 22–21, 22–29
Pts: Irving 15; Rebs: George 9 Asts: Irving, Cousins 5		Pts: Jokić 25; Rebs: Jokić 6 Asts: Teodosić 6

Carioca Arena 1, Rio de Janeiro
Attendance: 11,413
Referees: Stephen Seibel (CAN), Guilherme Locatelli (BRA), Piotr Pastusiak (POL)

==== France ====
14 August 2016
14:15

Boxscore

United States	100–97	France
Scoring by quarter: 30–24, 25–22, 26–23, 19–28
Pts: Thompson 30; Rebs: Durant 6 Asts: Irving 12		Pts: de Colo, Heurtel 18; Rebs: Heurtel 8 Asts: Heurtel 9

Carioca Arena 1, Rio de Janeiro
Attendance: 11,302
Referees: Borys Ryzhyk (UKR), José Reyes (MEX), Damir Javor (SLO)

=== Knockout round ===
Quarterfinals
17 August
Australia	90
Lithuania	64
17 August
Croatia	83
Serbia	86
17 August
Spain	92
France	67
17 August
United States	105
Argentina	78

Semifinals
19 August
Australia	61
Serbia	87
19 August
Spain	76
United States	82

Gold medal
21 August
Serbia	66
United States	96
Bronze medal
21 August
Australia	88
Spain	89

==== Quarterfinal – Argentina ====
17 August 2016
18:45

Boxscore

United States	105–78	Argentina
Scoring by quarter: 25–21, 31–19, 31–21, 18–17
Pts: Durant 27; Rebs: George 8 Asts: Durant 6		Pts: Scola 15; Rebs: Scola 10; Asts: Campazzo 9

Carioca Arena 1, Rio de Janeiro
Attendance: 11,700
Referees: Ilija Belošević (SRB), Guilherme Locatelli (BRA), Robert Lottermoser (GER)

==== Semifinal – Spain ====
19 August 2016
15:30

Boxscore

Spain	76–82	United States
Scoring by quarter: 17–26, 22–19, 18–21, 19–16
Pts: Gasol 23; Rebs: Gasol 8 Asts: Rodríguez 5		Pts: Thompson 22; Rebs: Jordan 16; Asts: Lowry, Thompson 3

Carioca Arena 1, Rio de Janeiro
Attendance: 10,455
Referees: Christos Christodoulou (GRE), José Reyes (MEX), Guilherme Locatelli (BRA)

==== Final – Serbia ====
21 August 2016
15:45

Boxscore

Serbia	66–96	United States
Scoring by quarter: 15–19, 14–33, 14–27, 23–17
Pts: Nedović 14; Rebs: Jokić 4 Asts: three players 3		Pts: Durant 30; Rebs: Cousins 15; Asts: Lowry 5

Carioca Arena 1, Rio de Janeiro
Attendance: 10,658
Referees: José Reyes (MEX), Borys Ryzhyk (UKR), Juan García (SPA)

=== Statistics ===
Legend
GP	Games played	GS	Games started	MPG	Minutes per game
FGM	Field goals made	FGA	Field goals attempted	FG%	Field goal percentage
3PM	3-point field goals made	3PA	3-point field goals attempted	3P%	3-point field goal percentage
FTM	Free throws made	FTA	Free throws attempted	FT%	Free throw percentage
RPG	Rebounds per game	APG	Assists per game	PPG	Points per game

Player	GP	GS	MPG	FGM	FGA	FG%	3PM	3PA	3P%	FTM	FTA	FT%	RPG	APG	PPG
Kevin Durant	8	8	28.8	52	90	.578	25	43	.581	26	32	.813	5.0	3.5	19.4
Carmelo Anthony	8	8	23.3	33	84	.393	18	45	.400	13	21	.619	5.3	2.2	12.1
Kyrie Irving	8	8	22.0	31	65	.477	9	24	.375	20	22	.909	2.5	4.9	11.4
Paul George	8	2	19.0	32	70	.457	8	28	.286	18	21	.857	4.5	1.9	11.2
Klay Thompson	8	6	21.1	28	77	.363	16	49	.327	7	9	.778	2.5	1.6	9.9
DeMarcus Cousins	8	5	14.6	27	44	.614	0	0	--	19	23	.826	5.8	1.6	9.1
DeAndre Jordan	8	3	17.3	23	31	.742	0	0	--	13	32	.406	6.1	0.8	7.4
DeMar DeRozan	7	0	11.1	16	27	.593	0	2	.000	14	18	.778	1.4	0.9	6.6
Jimmy Butler	8	0	14.4	13	38	.342	2	9	.222	17	18	.944	2.5	1.4	5.6
Kyle Lowry	8	0	16.3	12	29	.414	3	11	.273	13	17	.765	3.3	3.8	5.0
Harrison Barnes	4	0	8.0	6	13	.462	1	3	.333	4	4	1.000	1.8	0.8	4.3
Draymond Green	8	0	9.8	5	22	.227	1	11	.090	4	7	.571	2.1	1.2	1.9
Total	8	8	200	278	590	.471	83	225	.369	168	224	.750	45.5	24.0	100.9
Opponents	8	8	200	231	538	.429	52	182	.286	113	147	.769	35.5	20.0	78.4
